= List of 90210 characters =

This is a list of the characters that have appeared on 90210, an American teen drama. The series introduces Annie Wilson (Shenae Grimes) and her adopted brother Dixon (Tristan Wilds), who move from Kansas to Beverly Hills with their father Harry (Rob Estes) and mother Debbie (Lori Loughlin). The family relocated in order to care for Harry's mother Tabitha (Jessica Walter).

== Casting ==
The first actor to be cast for the TV series was Dustin Milligan on April 1, 2008, followed by AnnaLynne McCord on April 14. Sachs found Milligan to be "really funny", and changed Ethan to better represent his personality. McCord was cast because, according to Sachs, "she's someone who is worldly, and there's a sophistication to her that's interesting." The role of Annie was given to Shenae Grimes, who said she grew up watching the original series. Sachs and Judah had seen Grimes' work before and knew "she had the acting chops", and she was cast after acting a dramatic scene which she "just killed". Sachs stated, "she can act, she's beautiful, and she can give this sweet cuteness [that lets us see] through her eyes into this world."

Lori Loughlin auditioned for the role of Debbie and was given the part immediately. Sachs thought that Loughlin was too established to read for the part, but realized that she understood the role at once. The producers were fans of Jessica Walter after watching her film Play Misty for Me. Sachs found that Walter knew pieces of scenes and suggested "stuff that works". Sachs described Ryan Eggold, who portrayed Matthews, as "a sophisticated actor, and he's also very funny." Sachs believed that every time Eggold would be on screen, "people are going to go, 'Wow!'". The producers were looking for an actor who could portray Silver as a "quirky kid who moves to her own beat". Sachs explained that Jessica Stroup "came in dressed for the part, artsy and quirky, and she had her hair up and she had a bandana. She nailed it." The producers were fans of Tristan Wilds for his acting on The Wire, and hoped to hire him as Dixon from the start of casting. When asked about Michael Steger, who portrays Navid, Sachs said that "he's just great". Rob Estes, the last actor to join the series, was a previous cast member of the first Beverly Hills, 90210 spin-off, Melrose Place. Estes was sought by The CW to play Harry, but was contracted on the drama Women's Murder Club. When the series was cancelled, Sachs called Estes and explained the spin-off and motivated him to participate. Sachs promised that although he was playing a parent, he would not "be furniture...as in the seldom seen or heard parents who populate many youth-centric series, like the Walsh parents on the original 90210."

The CW confirmed that Jennie Garth, Shannen Doherty, Tori Spelling and Joe E. Tata would be returning in recurring roles as their original characters. Sachs was familiar with Garth, and talked to her about a possible role in the series. Garth agreed to star on the series without reading a script after conceptualizing ideas with Sachs. The producers offered Garth a role as a series regular, but she opted to sign on as a recurring character. Doherty decided to appear after talking with Sachs, but her appearance was moved to the second episode. Sachs described Tata's casting as an accident; a friend told Sachs that he had seen Tata in a store, which led to the offer of a recurring role in the series. Sachs said that Tata was ecstatic about the idea and agreed. After reading the script, Spelling expressed interest in returning, and the writers decided to give her character her own fashion line. Spelling was scheduled to appear in the premiere of the series, but for personal reasons including the birth of her daughter, she opted to appear later in the season.

== Cast timeline ==
Main cast
Recurring guest star (3+ episodes)
Guest star (1–2 episodes)

Character	Actor	Seasons				
Character	Actor	1	2	3	4	5
Harry Wilson	Rob Estes	Main	Main			
Annie Wilson	Shenae Grimes	Main	Main	Main	Main	Main
Dixon Wilson	Tristan Wilds	Main	Main	Main	Main	Main
Naomi Clark	AnnaLynne McCord	Main	Main	Main	Main	Main
Ethan Ward	Dustin Milligan	Main				
Ryan Matthews	Ryan Eggold	Main	Main	Main		
Erin Silver	Jessica Stroup	Main	Main	Main	Main	Main
Navid Shirazi	Michael Steger	Main	Main	Main	Main	Main
Debbie Wilson	Lori Loughlin	Main	Main	Main		Guest
Tabitha Wilson	Jessica Walter	Main (Note: Walter departs in "Love Me or Leave Me" (episode 1.13).)				
Adrianna Tate-Duncan	Jessica Lowndes	Main (Note: Lowndes appeared in a recurring role in season 1, before joining the main cast in "By Accident" (episode 1.14).)	Main	Main	Main	Main
Liam Court	Matt Lanter	Recurring	Main	Main	Main	Main
Ivy Sullivan	Gillian Zinser		Recurring	Main	Main	
Teddy Montgomery	Trevor Donovan		Recurring	Main	Recurring	Recurring
Returning from Beverly Hills, 90210
Kelly Taylor	Jennie Garth	Recurring	Recurring			
Nat Bussichio	Joe E. Tata	Recurring				
Brenda Walsh	Shannen Doherty	Recurring				
Jackie Taylor	Ann Gillespie	Guest	Recurring			
Donna Martin	Tori Spelling	Guest				
Recurring cast members
Tracy Clark	Christina Moore	Recurring				Guest
Charles Clark	James Patrick Stuart	Recurring				
George Evans	Kellan Lutz	Recurring				
Ty Collins	Adam Gregory	Recurring				Guest
Constance Tate-Duncan	Maeve Quinlan	Recurring	Guest	Guest		
Kimberly MacIntyre	Jessica Lucas	Recurring				
Ozzie Cardoza	Michael Trevino	Recurring				
Omar Shirazi	Shaun Duke	Guest	Guest	Recurring	Guest	
Atoosa Shirazi	Fabiana Udenio	Recurring	Guest	Recurring		
Rhonda Kimble	Aimee Teegarden	Recurring				
Jen Clark	Sara Foster	Recurring	Recurring	Recurring	Recurring	
Mark Driscoll	Blake Hood		Recurring			
Jeffrey Sarkossian	John Schneider		Recurring			
Gia Mannetti	Rumer Willis		Recurring			
Colleen Sarkossian	Sarah Danielle Madison		Recurring		Guest	
Sasha	Mekia Cox		Recurring	Guest		
Jasper Herman	Zachary Ray Sherman		Recurring			Guest
Lila	Amber Wallace		Recurring	Guest		
Laurel Cooper	Kelly Lynch		Recurring	Recurring		
Miles Cannon	Hal Ozsan		Recurring	Recurring		
Javier Luna	Diego Boneta		Recurring	Guest		
Oscar	Blair Redford			Recurring		
Charlie Selby	Evan Ross			Recurring		
Victor Luna	Nestor Serrano			Recurring		
Ian	Kyle Riabko			Recurring		
Emily Bradford	Abbie Cobb			Recurring		Guest
Max Miller	Josh Zuckerman			Recurring	Recurring	Recurring
Marco Salazar	Freddie Smith			Recurring		
Raj Kher	Manish Dayal			Recurring	Recurring	
Austin Talridge	Justin Deeley			(Note: Deeley first appears as Terry, a male stripper at Ivy's bachelorette party.)	Recurring	Guest
Leila Shirazi	Summer Bishil				Recurring	
Holly Stickler	Megalyn Echikunwoke				Recurring	
Shane	Ryan Rottman				Recurring	Guest
Marissa Harris-Young	Brandy Norwood				Recurring	
Patrick Westhill	Chris McKenna				Recurring	Guest
Greg Davis	Niall Matter	Guest (Note: Greg is initially played by David Chisum for 2 episodes in season 1.)			Recurring	
Rachel Gray	Michelle Hurd				Recurring	Guest
Vanessa Shaw	Arielle Kebbel				Recurring	Recurring
Preston Hillingsbrook	Nick Zano				Recurring	
Diego Flores	Yani Gellman				Recurring	
Caleb Walsh	Robert Hoffman				Recurring	
Alec Martin	Trai Byers					Recurring
Riley Wallace	Riley Smith					Recurring
Megan Rose	Jessica Parker Kennedy					Recurring
Campbell Price	Grant Gustin					Recurring
Michaela	Lyndon Smith					Recurring
Mark Holland	Charlie Weber					Recurring
Jordan Welland	Robbie Jones					Recurring
Elizabeth Royce Harwood	Keke Palmer					Recurring

== Major characters ==
=== Annie Wilson ===
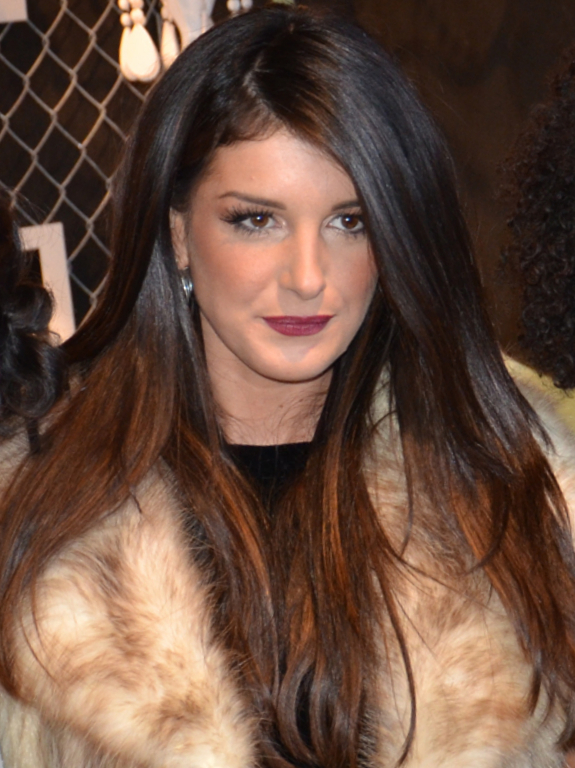
Shenae Grimes portrays Annie Wilson. Grimes was cast after producers saw her acting a dramatic scene which they believe "she just killed."

Played by Shenae Grimes, Annie is introduced as an aspiring actress who moves from Wichita, Kansas, to Beverly Hills with her family. She is based in part on Brenda Walsh from the original series. She lives with her parents, Harry and Debbie, her adopted brother Dixon (whom she considers her best friend) and her grandmother Tabitha. She becomes friends with Silver over a Division Day sticker in the episode "We're Not In Kansas Anymore". She struggles to find her place in California and to maintain her sweet nature. She and Ethan had dated after he broke up with Naomi, but concealed it so that Naomi would not find out until they were ready to tell her. She does, however, find out when she sees their intimacy in an empty classroom. Jealous, Naomi uses this in favor to get back at her by kissing Annie's ex-boyfriend from Kansas at Annie's sixteenth birthday party. She also finds out that she shares a half-brother with Naomi from a previous high school relationship between her father Harry and Naomi's mother. She and Ethan later part ways and she gets back in Naomi's good books. In the season finale after prom, Annie is framed when Naomi's sister Jen ends up in bed with Liam. Jen had taken Annie's wrap earlier, to which Naomi finds the wrap and a half-naked Liam in her room, automatically believing Annie had slept with Liam, as she confronts her in front of the entire class. This leads to everyone turning on Annie and abusively shouting at her, resulting in Annie storming out and calling the police on Naomi, and then taking a bottle of vodka when she drives off. In the morning Annie is seen driving with the now half-empty bottle of vodka. She takes her eyes off the road and ends up running someone over and driving away out of fear.

In the second season, Annie breaks away from the group and becomes somewhat of a loner due to the secret she is hiding and the resentment Naomi has for her. At the beginning of Season 2, they are all at a beach party when she meets up with Mark, a senior. He gets her drunk and finds a way to get a cabana. Annie is not aware, however, that he had taken a naked photo of her topless. When that photo is sent throughout her school by Naomi, Annie has a resentment against Mark, but then forgives him. She later agrees to a date with him where there is a confrontation between her and Mark. Just as Mark is about to date-rape her, Jasper swoops in to save her from him, who she had previously turned down to hang out with earlier. She falls in love with Jasper, a drug dealer and the nephew of the man she killed. After her estranged friends confront her with news that her boyfriend is a drug dealer, she confronts him about it. He informs her he knows that she killed his uncle, and then blackmails her so they can continue dating. Annie later decides she does not care about Jasper blackmailing her and forgets about it. He continues to threaten her with pictures of the damaged vehicles, but she informs him that if he still wants a chance to be with her, he won't go to the police. As Annie starts to move on, Jasper watches from afar. Jasper calls Annie to tell her that if he can't be with her there is not a reason to live. Annie frantically goes to Jasper's house attempting to find him. She figures out he is at the Hollywood sign and goes to stop him. The two have a brief encounter before Jasper jumps off the sign. Annie visits Jasper in the hospital, where she tells him that their relationship was just based on lies. He tells her that he will always love her, and because of this, he won't tell anyone her secret that she ran over his uncle. Annie leaves the hospital smiling with relief, as she feels a huge weight has just been lifted off her shoulders and she does not need to worry about Jasper any more.

Annie's parents start having marital problems and Annie has no one to talk to because Dixon won't listen to her. She goes to Liam for advice. Annie and Liam become close, hinting at a potential relationship. Jasper shows up at school and forgives Annie. Annie says she forgives him too, but they can't be friends because of what has happened in the past. Annie becomes closer to Liam and they share their family problems. Liam takes Annie out on his boat and she tells him about the hit and run. He encourages her to confess, they hug, and he takes her home. Unaware that Jasper was watching, Liam is attacked by Jasper by him setting fire to his boat, which he has spent a year working on. In the season finale, Annie tells her parents she needs to tell them something, hinting about the hit and run although this isn't shown.

In the third season, it is revealed that she has been sentenced to 2–3 months of house arrest, has her license suspended and is on probation until she turns 25. She is offered an interview for an internship by her Senior Adviser, Mr. Matthews. He advises her to put the accident behind her because she has already paid her dues. However, she decides she can't lie and confesses to the interviewer that she was on house arrest during the summer. She thinks that she won't get the internship but is shocked when the interviewer calls her and offers her the spot. It is then revealed that she has a secret motive and believes that Annie is desperate enough to do it. After she confesses to the interviewer, Liam and she finally kiss but she refuses to pursue a relationship because of Naomi and they end their friendship. She and Liam begin to date with Naomi's approval but soon break up after Liam almost gets her arrested after being caught on a boat that Liam claimed he was attending to for. She then pursues a relationship with Liam's half-brother Charlie whom she met in a coffee shop. She is not aware at the time that he is Liam's half-brother. Liam then moves into the Wilson Household to get closer to Annie. Although she does like him back, she finds out that Charlie and Liam are related after she introduces the two. Furthermore, when Annie tells Liam that she is going to break up with Charlie and take his side, he dismisses her and tells her she was right. Liam then walks off with the girl who paid in the bachelor auction. Annie stays with Charlie but when Liam is injured and moves in with her family, Annie admits that she still has feelings for Liam and they sleep together. The next day Annie feels guilty and asks Liam to let her think. After talking to her cousin Emily about the situation, she tells Liam that she wants to be with him but he turns her down because he and Charlie talked it out. He also tells her to stay with Charlie. Later, after Charlie discovers that something is going on between Annie and Liam, Charlie texts Annie with Liam's phone, saying, "Come see me tomorrow. We belong together". Annie goes to Liam's house where they realize that it was Charlie who sent the text and finally become a couple. Yet, the drama is not over with Annie since her cousin, Emily, is causing havoc for her. Then, Annie and Liam work together to expose Emily for who she really is and she leaves town. Annie later starts to work as an assistant for Marla, a washed-up old actress who suffers from an early stage of alzheimer's disease. Annie quickly bonds with Marla, and the two form a close friendship, which doesn't last long as Marla dies by suicide, and leaves her entire estate to Annie. Annie's happiness doesn't last for long as she finds out that Liam doesn't want to go to college and live near her. Liam tells her that he wants to work on a boat for the summer to clear out his mind. Annie who first opposes to Liam's decision, later makes-up with him and tells him to come to her after he finds what he's looking for.

In season 4, when Liam comes back, he walks up to her and puts an engagement ring on the hood of her car. She says no, but Liam is persistent. He proposes again, traditionally, but she still says no. She tells him the reason she said no is because something must have happened while he was away to make him decide to do this. She later finds out that Liam has had a one-night stand with a widowed woman named Jane. In the meantime, Annie also discovers that she told a man, who turns out to be Marla's grandson, about how Annie knew about the suicide before the incident happened, which creates problems for her in the process to get the inheritance. Annie also meets an Escort named Bree, who tricks her into helping her escort a few foreign men. When Annie discovers that she can get a lot of money from being an escort, she continues on which eventually leads to her relationship with a famous businessman named Patrick. When she finds out that Dixon is addicted to ADHD meds, she decides to sleep with Patrick to get money for Dixon's rehab. In the season 5 finale, Annie and Liam become engaged.

=== Dixon Wilson ===
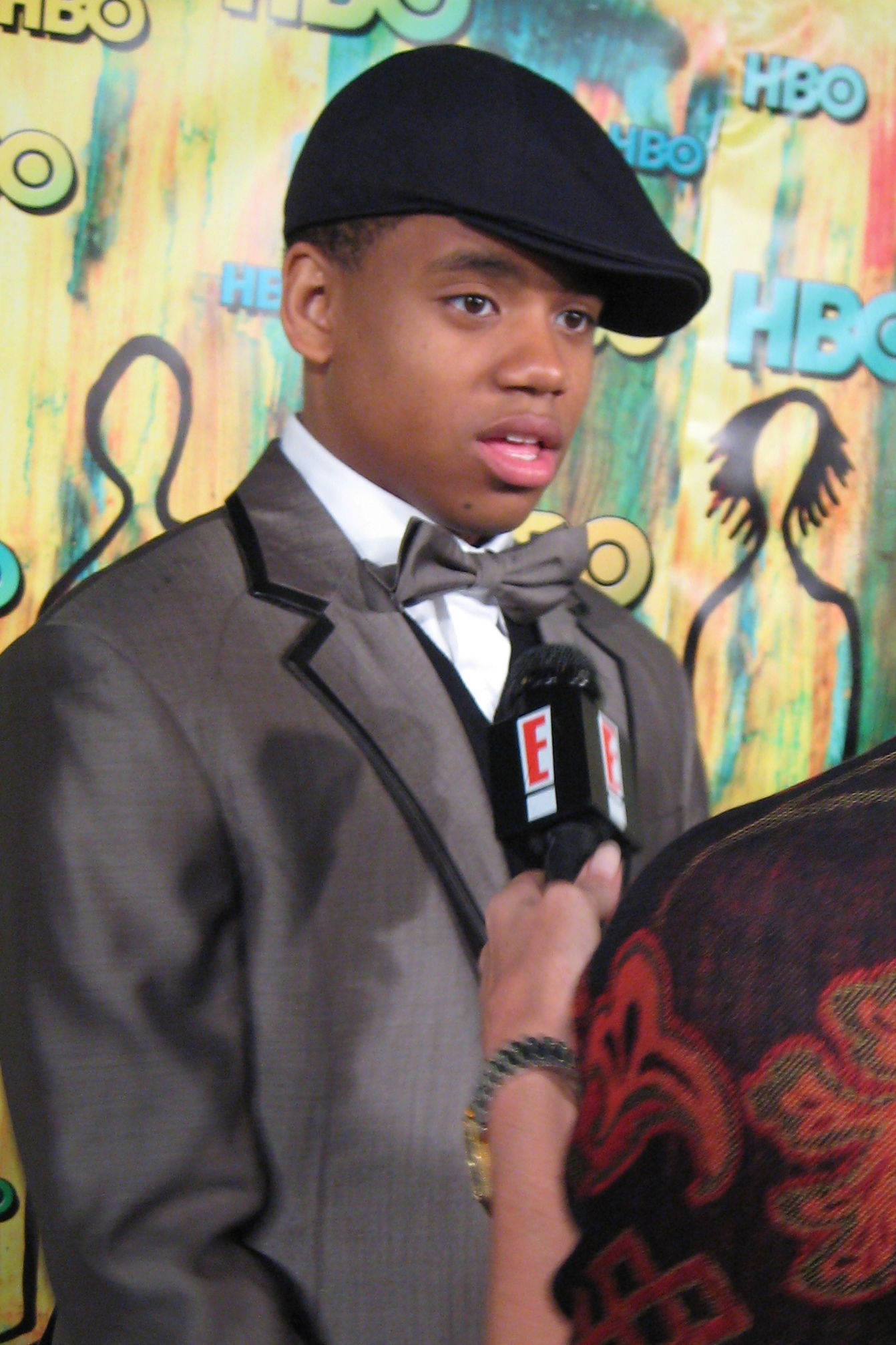
Tristan Wilds portrays adopted son of Harry and Debbie Wilson, Dixon Wilson.

Played by Tristan Wilds since the pilot, Dixon is the adopted son of Harry and Debbie Wilson, who holds a strong bond with his sister Annie. He is based on the part of Brandon Walsh from the main series Beverly Hills, 90210. He soon develops a romantic interest with his sister's friend Silver, and becomes her boyfriend after helping her with the school play. They continue to grow close after spending a lot of time together. In "By Accident", he breaks up with Silver but then reconciles with her in "Help Me, Rhonda", when Silver indicates that she's in love with him. Silver loses her virginity to him on Valentine's Day after a romantic dinner in which he gives her a bracelet. After finding out that Silver got a tattoo of his name, he is uneasy and has second thoughts about her. Their relationship continues to deteriorate as she exhibits strange and unusual behavior, which reaches a climax when she films them having sex without his knowledge and then shows the tape to an entire theater as her English project. Although Dixon breaks up with Silver after this, she continues to act out in an erratic fashion, and Dixon eventually realizes that she is suffering from bipolar disorder, a condition that his birth mother also suffered from. Dixon calms Silver down and they take her to the hospital. Soon, Silver finds it unbearable to go back to West Beverly High and decides to go to St. Claire's School for a better semester. He then helps her readjust and get back to her old life. They decide to go to the prom together. Dixon is voted "prom king", and after he rigged the results, Silver is awarded the West Bev. "prom queen". During her speech she admits that she's not prom material, which creates distance between her and Dixon. At the after-party, he opens up to Ethan that although it hasn't been easy between him and Silver, he loves her. When Dixon realizes Ethan has a crush on Silver, he confronts him about it which forces Ethan to reveal it in front of him and Silver, and it strains their friendship.

In the season 2 premiere, it is revealed he and Silver are not together, but about to reconcile. However, he learns from Teddy that she had been texting Ethan in secret and they shared a kiss, causing him to tell her he's done. He decides to join the West Bev. surf team along with Teddy, Liam, and later Ivy. When Silver tries to call him to try to get back together with him, he turns her down. They then argue when Silver decides to give him his stuff back. He then begins to date Sasha, an older DJ he meets. Dixon begins to tell her he's older and DJs for a living. When she finds out he was pretending, she dumps him but they later get back together. She then fakes a pregnancy to keep him from leaving her. He eventually finds out. When Silver's mother dies, he realizes that he misses her and wants to get back together with her, but she has feelings for Teddy. When Silver asks him about the girl Teddy was with (who was his sister), Dixon tells her he doesn't know, and she decides she's done with Teddy. He then kisses Silver, hinting a possible reconciliation. After seeing Teddy dancing with and kissing another girl, they kiss again, and he declares that he wants to get back together, but Silver tells him she just wants to be friends, a proposition to which Dixon agrees. He seems to resemble Brandon Walsh from the original series, as he is also hired at the Peach Pit. His best friends are Navid, Liam, Teddy and Ivy. He is currently 17 years old. He and Ivy decide to fake being a real couple because they feel like outsiders. After Naomi and Liam break up, they fake "breaking up" so that Ivy can try to win back Liam, which makes Dixon a little jealous and disappointed, as he developed real feelings for her. After Liam turns Ivy down, Dixon asks her out and they decide to go on a real date realizing they have feelings for each other. Dixon shares with Ivy his family problems, and they begin to grow closer. In the end of Season 2, they plan to go to Australia but Harry tells him he can't because he broke into the school and Harry was covering for his gambling addiction, which Debbie doesn't know about but she later finds out. He and Ivy then get into a fight when she found out Dixon was trying to pay for his own way to Australia when she said she can pay for it. Dixon then hangs out with Silver and they later get drunk and end up kissing in a closet. Later he and Ivy then make up. When Dixon tells Ivy about the kiss with Silver, their relationship is briefly put on hold, but they later reconcile. When Debbie tells Dixon that he can't go to Australia, he sneaks out of the house while Harry and Debbie are arguing.

At the start of season 3, it is revealed that Dixon left Australia early due to his family's problems. When Dixon meets Oscar, an old friend of Ivy's, he is immediately jealous of him, especially when he constantly interrupts his time with Ivy. He gets into a fight with Ivy after she sees a picture on Facebook of Dixon taking shots off another girl's body. They later make up. Dixon then begins to wonder why Ivy never opens up to him about her past, but she shoots him down every time he asks. She decides to trust him and he learns about her rough past with her estranged father. He also learns that Ivy is a virgin, and after a date, they decide to sleep together. Their plans are put on hold after Sasha returns and surprises Dixon by telling him that she was HIV-positive. She warns him to get tested. It is revealed that he is HIV-negative. He breaks up with Ivy before his test results arrive, leading her into Oscar's hands. When he tells Ivy the good news, she is stunned. She later tells Dixon about her and Oscar, and Dixon breaks up with her. Dixon is the first to find out that Teddy is gay after he catches him kissing Ian. When he asks Teddy about it, Teddy tells him to keep it a secret. Dixon saves Ivy's life after an accident while surfing. She then asks him out a few episodes later, but he turns her down, saying he can't be anything more than friends at the moment. Currently Dixon and Navid are running Shirazi Studios while Navid's dad is facing his legal troubles. During their business endeavors Dixon gets to meet Nelly and Snoop Dogg. On the gang's spring break trip to Mexico, Dixon learns of Ivy's marijuana smoking and they have a heart to heart conversation about their past and become friends again. He also encourages Laurel, Ivy's mom, to attend Ivy's wedding to Raj, and Laurel shows up at the wedding later.

In season 4, it is revealed that over the summer Dixon was on a hip-hop tour with one of his favorite DJs. He decides to attend college, but after Navid ruins his chance of getting a dorm on campus by forging his dorm papers and making him check in the girls dorm, he finds himself without a place to stay. Navid then gives him an ad listing for a 2 bedroom condo. Dixon then moves in with a new roommate, Austin. At Naomi's party, he tells Annie that he has decided not to go to college and wants to get into the music business, which she disagrees with. Later, after witnessing Silver harshly turning down Adrianna's apology, he goes over and comforts Ade. The next morning while on the balcony of his new condo, Adrianna walks out with Austin's T-shirt on and tells Dixon she came over because she needed someone to talk to, but ran into Austin. It is hinted that she and Austin slept together, but Austin later tells Dixon they only made out a little and that's it. He then talks to Adrianna and she tells him she has decided to go home, and that the only reason she's been hanging around with Dixon is because he is the only one who doesn't look at her like she's pure evil. She also tells Dixon that she listened and loves the new music he's been working on and encourages him to continue at it. He also tries to help Liam get his money back after he drunkenly buys the bar on the beach, but Liam changes his mind and decides to keep it. Dixon then helps Adrianna get a job at Liam's new bar. When he feels the pressure of trying to make good tracks to impress a famous record producer, Austin, offers his ADHD medication to keep him focus and energized. Although he rejects it at first, Dixon gives in and takes a pill. Adrianna finds out that Dixon is using drugs and insists he goes to rehab, they get close and end up dating. Annie doesn't like the fact they are dating but still gets the money for Dixon's rehab by 'dating' Patrick. Adrianna and Dixon decide to produce a track together, when they are going to festivals to promote the track Dixon is asked by a major record label if he would sign with them, without Adrianna. He does not make an immediate decision however later on leaves to go on tour solo. He loses contact with Adrianna but in the last episode they decide to meet, Adrianna thinks Dixon is not going to show up so she leaves to go join Austin and produce music with him. It is shown that Dixon has been traveling back to meet her but is late; just as she steps on the plane, Dixon's car is involved in a massive car crash with a lorry. The car is turned over and it is not known whether Dixon has survived or not. However, in season 5 we find out that Dixon did indeed survive but has obviously suffered and is left with a wheelchair, then crutches. At the time of season 5's end he has made a nearly total recovery.

=== Naomi Clark ===
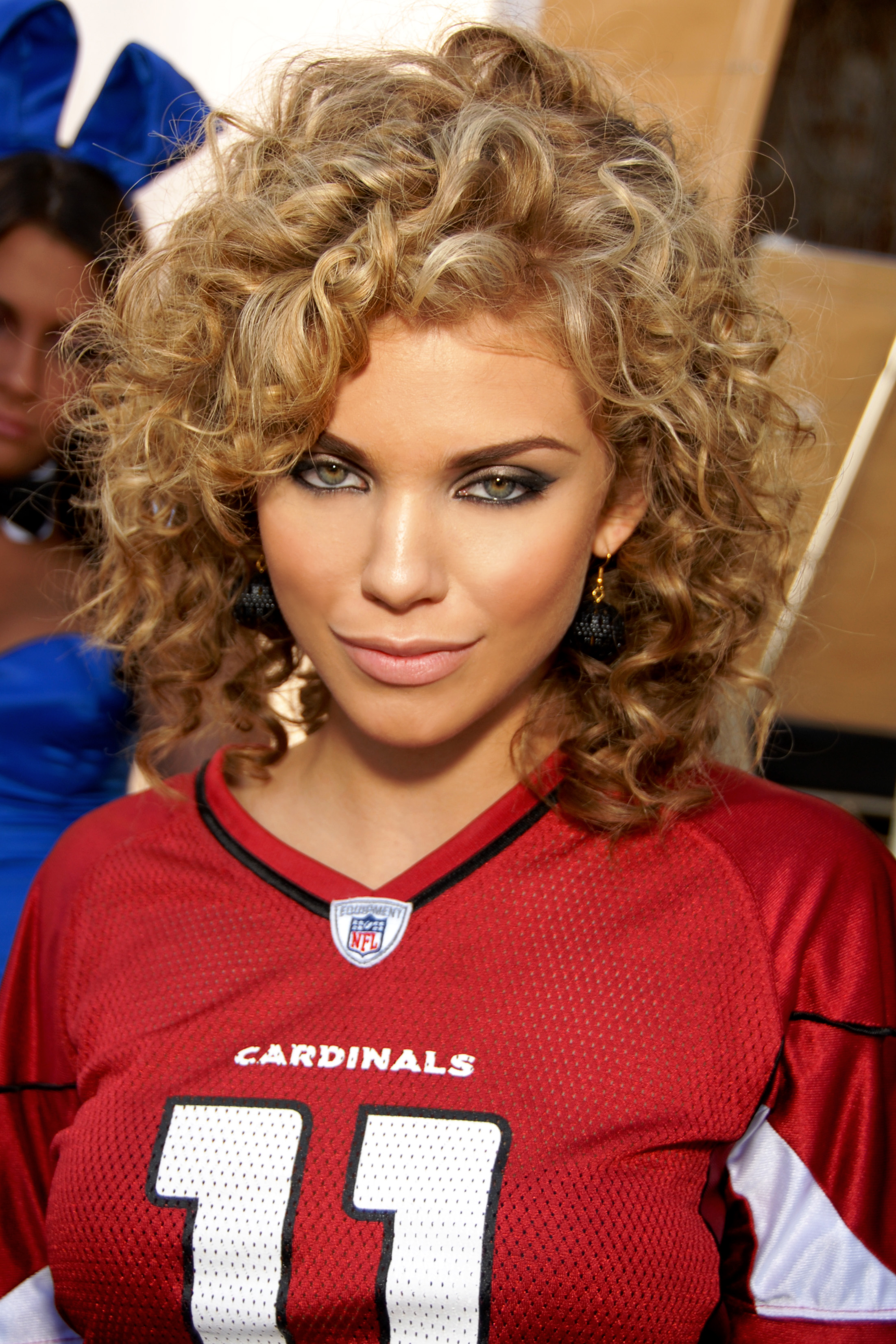
AnnaLynne McCord portrayed Naomi Clark since the pilot and was later referred to as the series' central character by the media.

Played by AnnaLynne McCord since the pilot, Naomi is introduced as the wealthy, beautiful and privileged “Queen Bee” of West Beverly Hills High. She is based in part on Kelly Taylor from the original show. As the show progressed, the media began to refer to Naomi Clark as the series' central figure. She initially appears to be snobbish and shallow, but throughout the series her character develops. She begins as Ethan's girlfriend, but their relationship soon encounters many problems which eventually cause them to break up for good. She starts to become good friends with Annie, but tells her that Annie can't go out with Ethan if they are going to be friends. Annie's dismissal of this statement leads to a rift in their friendship. Naomi seems to resemble Kelly Taylor from the original series due to her 'in-crowd' status and quarrel with Annie, after Annie dates Ethan, her ex, behind her back (in much the same way that Brenda and Kelly quarreled over Dylan). Naomi's parents divorce because of Naomi's father's infidelity and she continually tries to encourage them to reconcile but eventually gives up. A little later, she starts to like Liam, a bartender at the hotel she has moved to due to the awkward situation created by the divorce of her parents. Before the prom, he tells her that he really likes her, and then tells her some of his deepest secrets. At Naomi's after-party, Jen, her sister, lies to Liam and sleeps with him to get back at Naomi because she found out that she paid for the house and started acting superior (according to Jen). Naomi catches the aftermath (sans Jen) and finds Annie's wrap with Liam, causing her to publicly accuse Annie of sleeping with Liam. She's last shown being comforted by Jen after finding out about Annie and Liam's "betrayal".

In the next season, Liam is constantly trying to find a way to prove to Naomi that he slept with Jen rather than Annie, while Naomi tries to get over him. She ironically relies a lot on Jen. She makes Annie's life miserable for a part of Season 2, as revenge for her mistaken assumptions. She eventually puts these feelings aside and aspires to attend California University after graduating high school. Here, she meets a student who she instantly has a crush on. They date, but Naomi realizes that she still cares about Liam. Naomi later discovers that it was Jen Liam slept with, not Annie. She makes Jen leave her house and gets a therapist to "de-Jen" her life. She gets together with Liam after the Winter Wonderland but finds that when they spend time together it feels awkward. Confused, she asks Adrianna for advice. Adrianna tells her there is only one way to establish whether or not the two have chemistry. She follows Adrianna's advice and realizes that she still does have "the spark" with Liam. However, something is still not right. Naomi asks Ivy for help because Liam is more relaxed around her. Ivy agrees but secretly uses the time she spends with the pair to get closer to Liam and push Naomi away. It doesn't take long for Naomi to notice and realize that Ivy likes Liam. She and Ivy have a fight on the beach over Liam. Ivy insists she is a better match for Liam, causing Naomi to break down and confront him, telling him that they have nothing in common and that she has been pretending to be who she thinks he wants her to be. However, the outburst only makes Liam happier with Naomi because he feels that she is truly being herself - the girl he fell for. After Liam's stepfather cheats on his wife, Naomi agrees to let Liam move in. Liam then moves out when he breaks up with Naomi after she lies about Mr. Cannon sexually harassing her. However, he gets back with her. In the second-season finale, Liam breaks up with Naomi because he thinks she is too self-centered. A distraught Naomi talks to Mr. Cannon but she soon realizes that Mr. Cannon truly did have sexual intentions with her as he kisses her. In response, Naomi starts to back off but Mr. Cannon slaps her and tells her, "Who's going to believe you? After all, you're the girl who cried wolf." He then continues to rape her.

In season 3, Naomi deals with being sexually assaulted by Mr. Cannon. She also begins to build a better relationship with her sister, Jen, and falls for her "nerdy" lab partner, Max, after he helps her with a problem. Naomi and Max begin dating, at first secretly in order to avoid criticism from their friends. However, Naomi concludes that the secret nature of their relationship is making her jealous and overly possessive and the two eventually become open about their relationship. At the end of season three, Max gets caught in a cheating scandal and his parents force him to break off his relationship with Naomi. The third season ends with Naomi telling Max that she is pregnant.

Season 4 starts with the pregnancy being a false alarm and a very excited Max Miller expressing the way he feels about the results, which unfortunately leaves Naomi thinking Max doesn't love her and forces them to break up. She then meets Austin Tallridge when buying a new house. Meanwhile, she makes an enemy of sorority girl Holly, and they start an ongoing episodic banter of hatred. Naomi gets Holly's mom as her boss later on in the season. Naomi then creates her own business of 'party planning' in which she is in rival with Holly's mother. Naomi also has an accidental reunion with Max later on in the series when Max returns with his new fiancé who asks Naomi to plan their wedding. Naomi confesses to Max that she still has feelings for him but he pretends that he could not remember her saying that. During the day of Max's rehearsal for his marriage Naomi gets an offer from Holly's mother to go and work for her in a different place in America. Naomi is due to leave the next day however Max decides he cannot go through with his marriage and confesses to Naomi that he still loves her just as she realizes she cannot leave him behind again. The two are reunited just as the season ends.

In the season 5 premiere, she elopes with Max, later finding out that Max's business partner does not support the marriage. She finds out why his partner doesn't like her; in the meantime, he tries to find a way to destroy their marriage. Later, Max's partner brings in someone from Max and Naomi's past.

=== Erin Silver ===
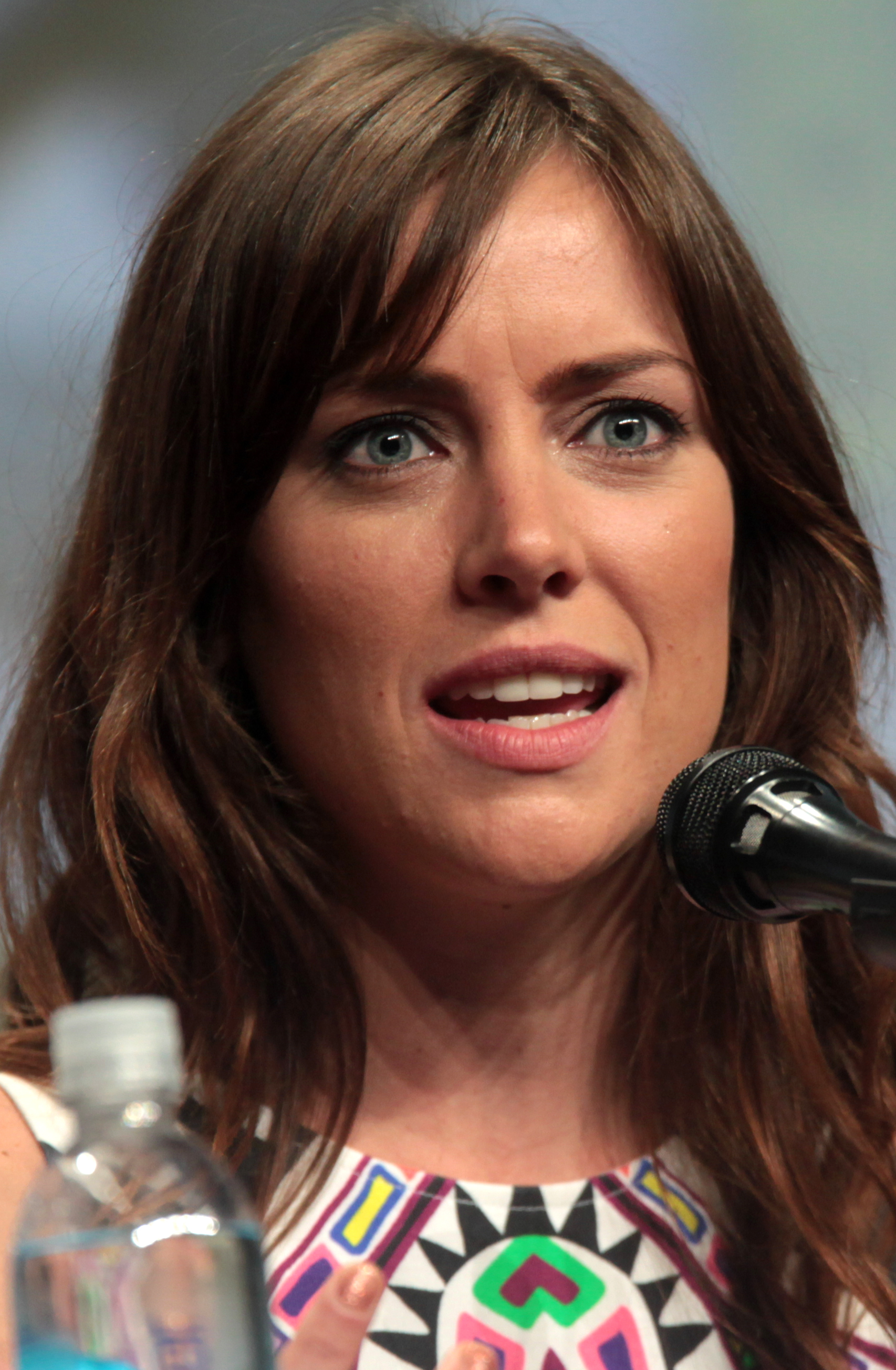
Jessica Stroup portrays Silver.

Played by Jessica Stroup since the pilot, Erin Silver was originally introduced in Beverly Hills, 90210. She is commonly called by her last name Silver, and is Kelly Taylor's and David Silver's half-sister. She published her own blog called The Vicious Circle, which she used to discuss intimate details (truth or fiction) about her peers at West Beverly High School. She becomes best friends with Annie and develops a romantic interest in Dixon, which quickly blossoms into a relationship. It is revealed that Silver shared the information of father's affair with her then-best-friend Naomi. Naomi makes this public knowledge, causing Silver's mother to turn to drinking. She celebrates her half-birthday only because her mother always seems to mess up her real birthday. In "By Accident" Dixon dumps her after taking advice from his mother Debbie, but later in "Help Me, Rhonda", they get back together after Silver says that she loves him. She decides to put together a romantic dinner for Dixon on Valentine's Day, which doesn't go exactly as planned and Silver begins to freak out as she wanted it to be perfect, but Dixon assures her that he's having a good time. He gives her a bracelet, and she loses her virginity to Dixon. Silver has always had a slightly manic personality, but in "Life's a Drag" she becomes more unbalanced. She visits Dixon at the Peach Pit where they end up having sex. Silver secretly tapes it and then shows the tape to an entire theater, causing Dixon to break up with her. She ends up breaking into Ryan Matthews' house, claiming that he destroyed her relationship with Dixon, and threatening him with a bottle of wine unless he fixes everything. Silver then attempts to run away to Kansas, stating repeatedly that going there would help her solve her problems with Dixon. A stranger finds her while she is saying random things and acting erratically. The stranger then calls someone to come get her. Dixon and his mother and father find her on the train tracks. Dixon remembers his birth mother having bipolar disorder and showing similar symptoms, and realizes that Silver suffers from it also. Dixon calms Silver down and they take her to the hospital. Soon Silver finds it unbearable to go back to West Beverly High and decides to go to St. Claire's School for a better semester. Dixon tries to help her re-adjust and get back to her old life. She and Dixon decide to go to the prom together. After Dixon rigs the results, Silver is awarded the West Bev. "prom queen" at that year's prom, but admits that she's not prom material, which creates distance between her and Dixon. In the season finale, she asks Ethan about her and Dixon. She says they are too different, but she loves him. Ethan assures her that they work and they make a great couple, which Silver is relieved to hear. It is soon mentioned to Silver that Ethan has a crush on her after Dixon confronts him about it. After hearing the news, Silver runs after Ethan to find out if its true. Ethan and Silver share a kiss, and he tells her he wants to be with her. When she tells him they can't, he points out that she ran after him instead of being with Dixon, and she is left confused.

In season 2, she and Dixon decide to get back together, but Teddy, Adrianna's ex boy-friend, finds her phone and finds out that she's been texting Ethan over the summer and he tells Dixon. After finding out, Dixon finds Silver and he tells her its over. While Adrianna and Naomi are comforting her, she tells them she only texted Ethan because she was confused after what happened at prom. But when she found out Ethan was moving away, the answer was easy: when she found out Ethan was staying in Montana with his dad, she was relieved. But when she thought of Dixon moving away, she said she couldn't breathe and she can't live without him. She then tries to win him back. She tries to call him after he makes the West Bev. surf team, but he turns her down, and she breaks down and cries in the parking lot. She decides to let him go and gives him his belongings back. They end up arguing and he tells her he could never be himself when he was with her. When she meets Dixon's new girlfriend Sasha, an older woman who DJs for a living, she becomes jealous. She finds out Dixon is lying to Sasha about who he is, but she just plays along as she still cares for him. When Silver's learns of her mother's cancer, she begins to grow close to Teddy, as he shares with her about his mother's fight with breast cancer, and death. They grow even closer after her mother passes away. She finds out Teddy wants to go out with her and he kisses her in the Winter Wonderland dance, but Silver later sees Teddy with another girl but not knowing it's his sister, Silver thinks Teddy has returned to his playboy ways and allows Dixon to kiss her. She then kisses Dixon again when she spots Teddy dancing and kissing on another girl. Although there were still some feelings there, she and Dixon decide to just be friends. When Silver figures out the girl is his sister, the couple finally get together. Teddy's father goes to see Silver and bribes her to break up with Teddy because he feels his tennis career is being distracted; even though she doesn't take the money, she starts thinking about what his father said so she breaks up with Teddy. In the season finale, she tells him she is sorry and that she loves him and they reconcile.

In season 3, Teddy and Silver break up because he has been drinking and lying about it, which is hard for Silver because of the history with her mother. They briefly reconcile and get back together, only for Teddy to call Ian a "faggot" during a rehearsal for Silver's breast cancer benefit and she effectively dumps him. After their breakup, Silver begins to focus on the Blaze, which starts Mr. Cannon's interest in Silver. Silver is almost drugged by Cannon when she stopped by his house to watch a documentary, but left when she saw that Naomi had said exactly the same phrase that was said by Cannon in the video. With her work in the Blaze, Silver developed a close bond with Navid and helped him with the problems that he had with his father. She even goes undercover as a porn star to help Navid investigate. As she gets to know Navid, she realizes her love for him and slowly, she starts to develop romantic feelings for him when he starts having relationship problems with Adrianna as well. Silver and Navid almost kiss, which is when they start to understand that there is something more between them. In the "Best L'eid Plans", it becomes apparent that Silver indeed does have feelings for Navid when he spends the night in her room talking about his father. When Navid and his current girlfriend, Adrianna, have an argument, Silver seems relieved to hear it and hesitates but agrees when Adrianna asks her for help to fix Adrianna's and Navid's relationship by helping her plan something special. As Silver takes Navid away from the party, he confesses that he has feelings for her, but the moment is interrupted by Adrianna and Silver is left disappointed. In the episode "Holiday Madness", when Navid confronts her in school, before he has a chance to explain what he feels and how he has no feelings for Adrianna anymore, she stops him from saying too much and tells him that it is because they have been spending too much time together and so they should keep their distance. Later on at Adrianna's Christmas party, Silver finds Navid alone and as he apologizes for ruining their friendship for feelings that he "thinks" he has for her, Silver finally admits that she does have feelings for him and he kisses her. Silver gets a text message from Naomi and decided to rescue her at her own apartment. Mr Cannon then holds Silver and Naomi hostage, but they eventually tie him to the chair. Naomi slaps Mr. Cannon and nearly kills him with his knife that he threatened to kill her with. But Naomi breaks down with Silver. They call the police and Mr. Cannon is arrested.

Adrianna finds out about Silver and Navid. When Adrianna pretends to think it was one of Navid's ex-girlfriends, she tells Silver she is going to send a nude picture of her to the entire school. Silver stops her and comes clean that she is the one Navid was cheating with and that they are in a relationship. Adrianna then tells her she knows, and she texts a nude picture of Silver to the entire school. Silver and Adrianna go back and forth playing mean pranks before they appear to reconcile, but Adrianna switches Silver's medication for bipolar disorder. She then begins to behave strangely: she dyes her hair in red, she calls for Christopher several times (the man who she had an interview with for NYU in the afternoon), etc. After receiving some distressing news about NYU, Silver has an emotional breakdown, causing Navid and Dixon to stage an intervention to make her go to a mental hospital. While Silver is in the hospital, Adrianna takes the opportunity to get close to Navid by getting him drunk and telling him that they kissed. When Navid continues to reject her, Adrianna tells Silver that Navid kissed her, effectively breaking them up. Fortunately, Silver finally discovers the truth during Ivy's bachelorette party when her medication falls out of Adrianna's purse. Adrianna is rejected by the group and Navid and Silver reconcile.

In season four, Navid and Silver are completely open about their relationship and they are both happy until Navid fires her for reasons unknown to her with all him telling her that he is protecting her. So they finally break up. Silver then meets a man and they start dating only to find out that he is the dad of 'enemy' Adrianna Tate-Duncans daughter. They end up breaking up after Adrianna picks her daughter up from school and they go and tell him that they are friends. Silver gets tested for the cancer gene in the middle of season four. When Silver finds out that she does have the cancer gene, she goes straight to see Liam, who has gotten closer to her over the past couple of episodes, and the pair end up sleeping together.

Knowing that Silver has the cancer gene heading into the season, her doctor tells her that if she wants to have a baby she has to do it now before it's too late. So, with her getting close to Liam and her having history with Navid, she doesn't know whom to have the baby with. She tells Liam and Navid that she wants to have a baby and they suddenly back out. She turns to Teddy, who is gay, and asks him if he'll donate his sperm in order for her to conceive. He agrees, but only if she isn't the one to carry the baby, due to her previous mental health problems.

In the season 5 finale, Silver discovers she has cancer and her friends agree to support her no matter what.

=== Navid Shirazi ===
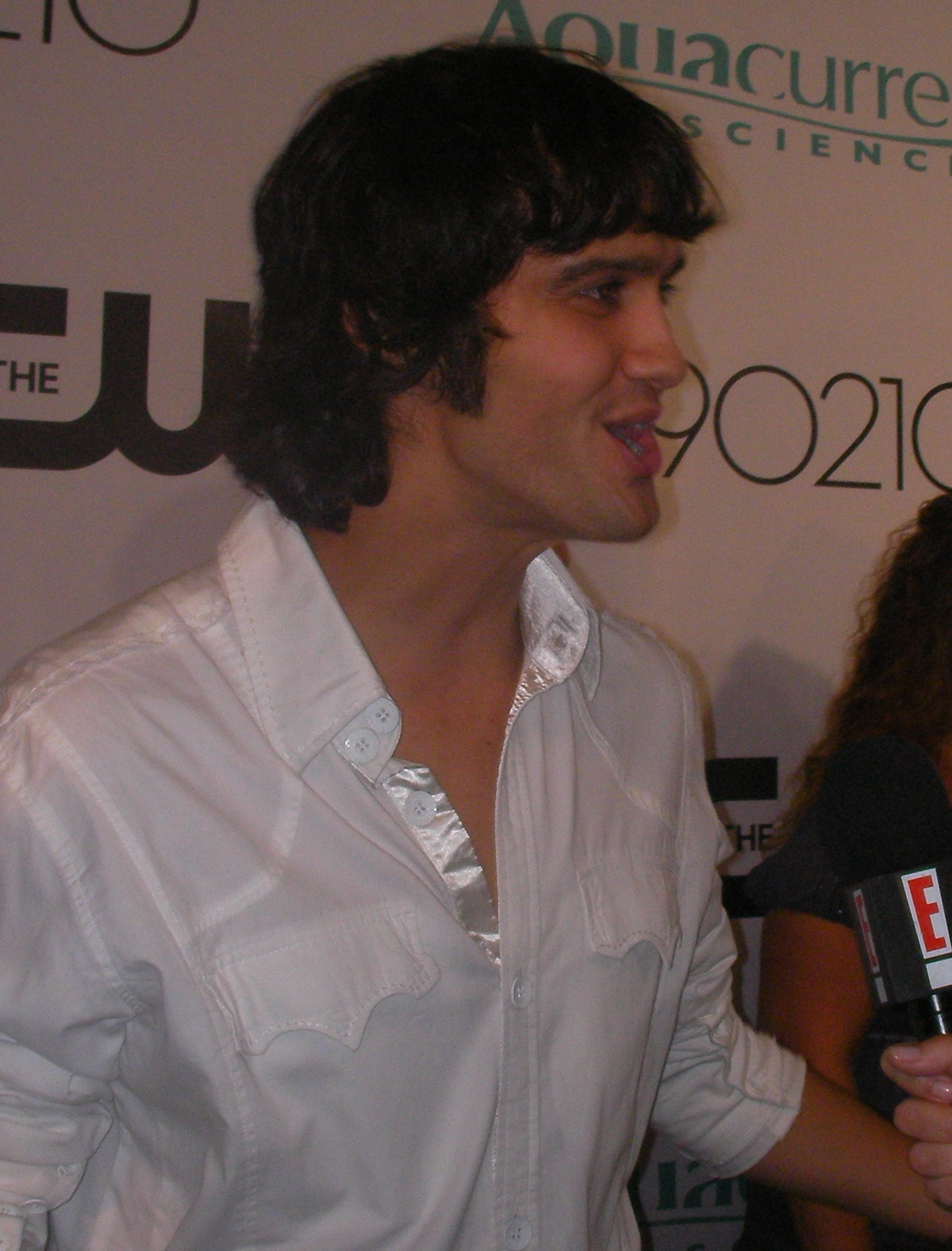
Michael Steger portrays school journalist Navid Shirazi.

Played by Michael Steger since the pilot, Navid is a student that runs the school newscast and interviews his classmates. He is often compared to David Silver from the original series. He has had feelings for Adrianna since middle school and secretly pays for her rehab. After the truth is revealed, Navid and Adrianna become a couple. He breaks up with her, however, when he finds out that she is pregnant, stating that he doesn't know how to handle the situation. He then starts dating an Iranian girl named Nika, whom he meets at Christina's party. When Adrianna asks him to broadcast her admitting her pregnancy to the whole school, he can't help but admire her incredible strength. Despite taking Nika to the Valentine's Day dance, he leaves her and goes to Adrianna's house where he asks her to be his Valentine, as he realizes that he doesn't care what a mess she is, he just wants her in his life. He asks Adrianna to marry him. They both realize that they can't get married or keep the baby. At prom Navid gets furious with Ty because he didn't help Adrianna during her pregnancy. While Navid and Ty are fighting, Adrianna tells Navid she is in labor. They rush to the hospital. Adrianna gives birth to a baby girl whom the adoptive parents name Maisie. Adrianna breaks up with Navid after she begins to have feelings for Teddy Montgomery and wants to pursue a relationship with him. After Adrianna discovers that Teddy doesn't want a relationship, but only a fling, Adrianna realizes what she has done and tries to get Navid back. However, Navid doesn't want anything to do with her.

Navid witnesses Adrianna buying drugs from Annie's boyfriend, Jasper. Navid tells Annie, who tells Jasper. Jasper is not happy and confronts Navid who doesn't take back his story. Later, when Jasper's relationship with Annie's parents begins to suffer because of the rumour, he pushes Navid down a flight of stairs. Navid asks Adrianna to tell that she bought drugs from Jasper. At first she refuses, but then she tells the gang that she will because she believes it's the right thing to do. This seems to bring Navid and Adrianna closer again. He then starts seeing Lila, but breaks up with her because he realizes he still has feelings for Adrianna. He also tries to tell her that he still loves her when she has her first show. Navid sees Adrianna wearing the bracelet he put in her dressing room and asks her where she got it; she tells him Javier, her new boyfriend, gave it to her. He tells her that he couldn't possibly have known the meaning of the charms of the bracelet and that he gave it to her. Navid tells her he loves her and the two get back together.

In season 3, Navid gets closer to Silver. Navid spends the night at Silver's and it soon becomes apparent that Silver and Navid do share romantic feelings for each other. After Navid and Adrianna have an intense argument on how ignorant she has been to her friends, Adrianna enlists Silver to help her make up for the argument by helping her do something nice for Navid. As Silver steals Navid away from the party to help Adrianna with her plan, Navid confesses that he has been having feelings for her. Adrianna interrupts the moment and so Silver is left hanging. In the next episode, "Holiday Madness", Navid reveals that he does not feel the same way he felt before for Adrianna, and that now he has Silver. Silver, afraid of ruining her friendship with Adrianna, tells Navid that she needs space and so they try to keep a distance between each other. All goes well, until Adrianna invites Navid and Silver for her housewarming sleepover, which the others in their group were unable to attend. Things become awkward as Adrianna, Navid and Silver are left to spend time alone together, and a moment occurs between Silver and Navid when they are both unable to sleep as they run into each other in the hallway. Navid tells Silver that he can't stop thinking about her and he asks her if what he feels for her is just all in his head. She says 'yes' but it is obvious that she doesn't mean it as she is unable to look him in the eye. When he steps forward and asks her if she feels the same way, Adrianna interrupts the moment.

In the latter part of the season, Silver and Navid become a real couple, hiding their relationship. At the Yoga Retreat they have sex in a tent. Things begin to fall apart, however, when Adrianna reveals that she knows Navid was seeing another girl, and that she wishes to get revenge on the girl. In season three, Navid discovers that his father has knowingly used underage girls in his films, making him a child pornographer. In an outburst in his guidance counselor's office Navid blurts this out, and his counselor sets events in motion, leading to Navid's father's conviction.

Afterwards, Navid hits upon the idea of using his father's old production studio as an enterprise to redeem his family name and earn some money. Working with Dixon, he rents it out for music videos, and his first one with Nelly could be called a qualified success.

In season four, things are going well for Navid, and he is happy with Silver. His younger sister comes to stay with them, making them have to act as parents before she runs away to live with a tattooist. Things start to go wrong for Navid as his uncle takes over one of his studios, and in order for Navid to tell the police, he must fire Silver to protect her. However, he cannot tell her this, and they eventually break up because Silver thinks he is lying again. He goes and lives with Dixon and Austin and eventually Silver and he become good friends again. In the series finale, Navid and Adrianna rekindle their relationship and later become engaged.

=== Ryan Matthews ===
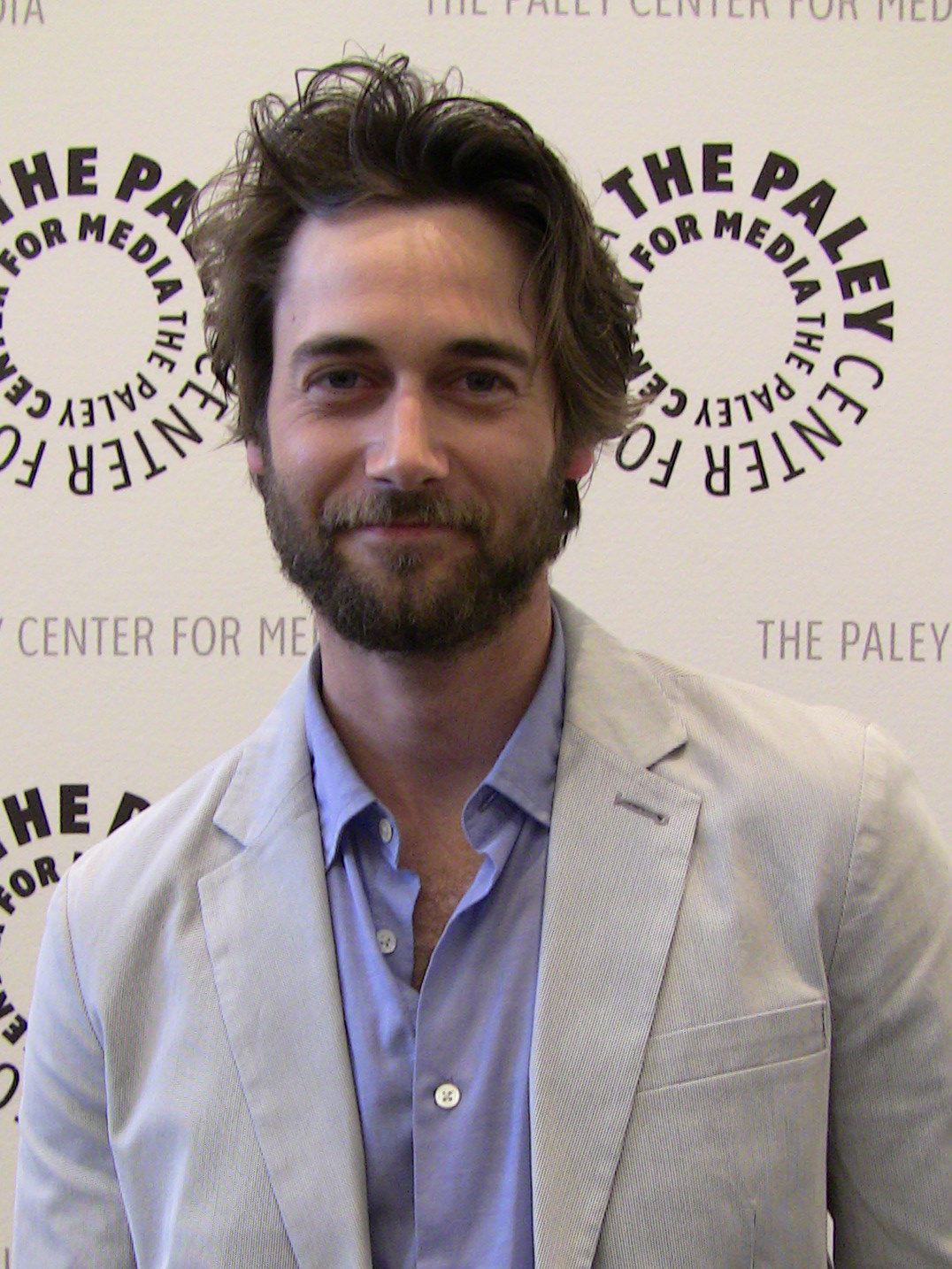
Ryan Eggold portrays the English teacher Ryan Matthews.

Portrayed by Ryan Eggold in seasons one to three, Ryan Matthews is an English literature teacher at West Beverly High in his mid 20s whose unorthodox teaching style puts him at odds with his fellow teachers and sometimes too close with his students. He was suspended for a brief time when it was discovered that he was having an affair with one of his students, who was actually an undercover cop trying to bring down a drug dealer who was dealing at West Beverly. Once he came back from his suspension, his attitude changed from positive influence to strict enforcer, going as far as kicking Silver out of his class as revenge for what she said about him on her blog. However, he soon takes her back in her class and goes back to his more supportive ways. He has served as a love interest of Kelly Taylor, Kimberly MacIntyre, Jen Clark and Laurel Cooper. He also had a one-night stand with Brenda while Kelly was away visiting Dylan. However, he and Kelly later hook up the night of her friend Donna Martin's store opening. Near the end of season 1, he starts dating Naomi's sister Jen Clark but he breaks it up when he finds out she had sex with one of his students and that she is married. He develops a drinking problem after that. At the end of Season 2 Jen comes back revealing that she is pregnant to her sister Naomi. Naomi finds a paternity test in Jen's bag. The viewer doesn't see anything at first, but it's then revealed that Ryan is the father when Naomi sent balloons saying "Congratulations Daddy". He goes to see Jen and tells her that he wants to help out but she says that she doesn't want a school teacher to take care of her child. He gets so upset that he drinks and drives by the school where he sees Naomi and a teacher in the school (it's later revealed that the teacher rapes Naomi) and hits a large sign by the school. Ryan and Jen's son Jacque/Jack was born in episode 5. He was suspended from West Beverly High in episode seven. When Jen leaves Ryan to care for Jacque alone, he turns to Debbie for help, and the two end up hooking up.

=== Debbie Wilson ===
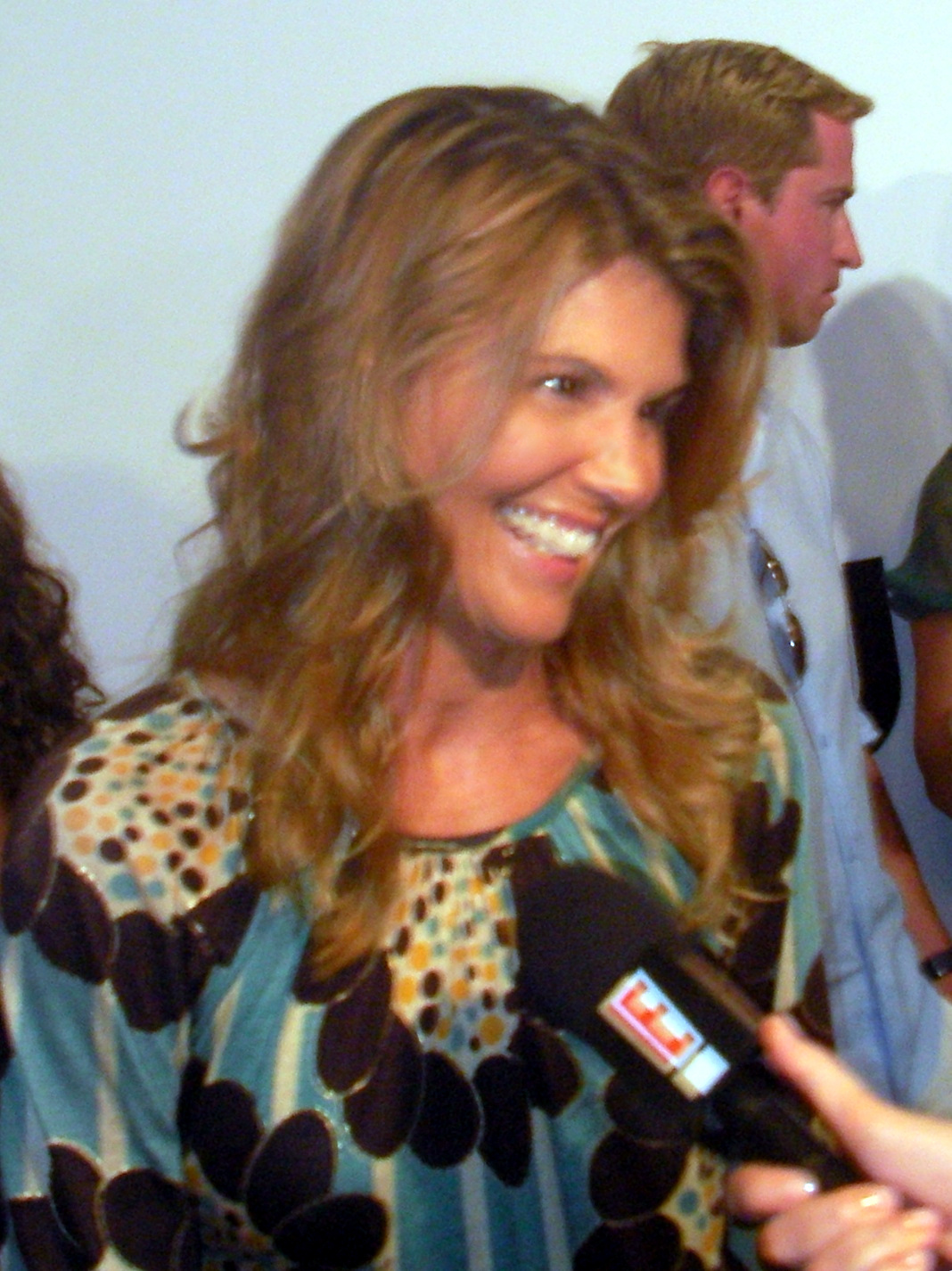
Lori Loughlin portrays Debbie Wilson.

Played by Lori Loughlin in seasons one to three, Debbie Wilson is the ex-wife of Harry Wilson and mother of Annie and Dixon Wilson, who works as a fashion photographer. She has a good relationship with her children, but clashes with her ex-mother-in-law Tabitha. She feels her and Harry's positions as the parents are threatened because they live in Tabitha's house, a feeling which is exasperated when Tabitha contradicts Debbie's wishes in raising her children. Debbie dislikes Tracy Clark, who had a son with Harry 25 years prior to the time of the series' premiere, and who, more recently, kissed Harry. She rushes to the hospital with Harry and Kelly because Adrianna is in labor. Harry sneaks some brownies from the prom party and they share them. Later, it is revealed that they were pot brownies, and they both become intoxicated on them. She sees a connection between Kelly and Harry and is suddenly concerned when she tells Harry. He tells her that it's nothing and it's just because of the pot brownies that makes her paranoid. She tells Kelly with a laugh about how she thinks Kelly has a crush on Harry, but Kelly tries to tell her different with resistance. After much tension between her and Kelly through season two, they make amends and attend yoga class together in a bid for Debbie to set Kelly up, but it seems that he is more interested in Debbie, as the scene ends with an awkward silence between Debbie and Kelly. She shares a kiss with her yoga instructor and it begins more problems between her and Harry. She later finds out that Dixon broke into the school as Harry was covering for him. In the season 2 finale, Harry gets fired for covering up for Dixon and Debbie asks Harry if he still loves her. The scene ends with an awkward silence between them as Harry doesn't answer.

Debbie struggles financially through the first episodes of season 3 due to her divorce. Her husband Harry moved out of the house and she is left to live with Annie and Dixon. Debbie is unable to find a job, so as a last resort she becomes assistant to Jen Clark's, Naomi's big sister. Debbie seems to be the only one that is able to control Jen and prevent her from being her usual mean self. Because of her new job, she becomes closer to Ryan Matthews, and the two have a sexual experience. Debbie admits that it would be weird for them to be together, and she decides to go on a date with a man she met on the Internet thanks to Annie and Dixon. The date does not go well, and she excuses herself to go to the bathroom after seeing that Ryan is there too. The two start talking and then have sex in the bathroom. They begin to date in secret but one night, Annie's cousin Emily sees them kissing and she tells it to Annie before an audition. In the third-season finale, Ryan asks Debbie to move to Paris with him to be close to Jen and their baby.

In the season 5 premiere episode, Debbie makes an appearance when she visits Annie while Dixon is in the hospital following a car accident, and she mentions to Annie that she is still living in Paris and has broken up with Ryan, but still keeps in touch with him and also helps Jen Clark raise her son.

=== Harry Wilson ===
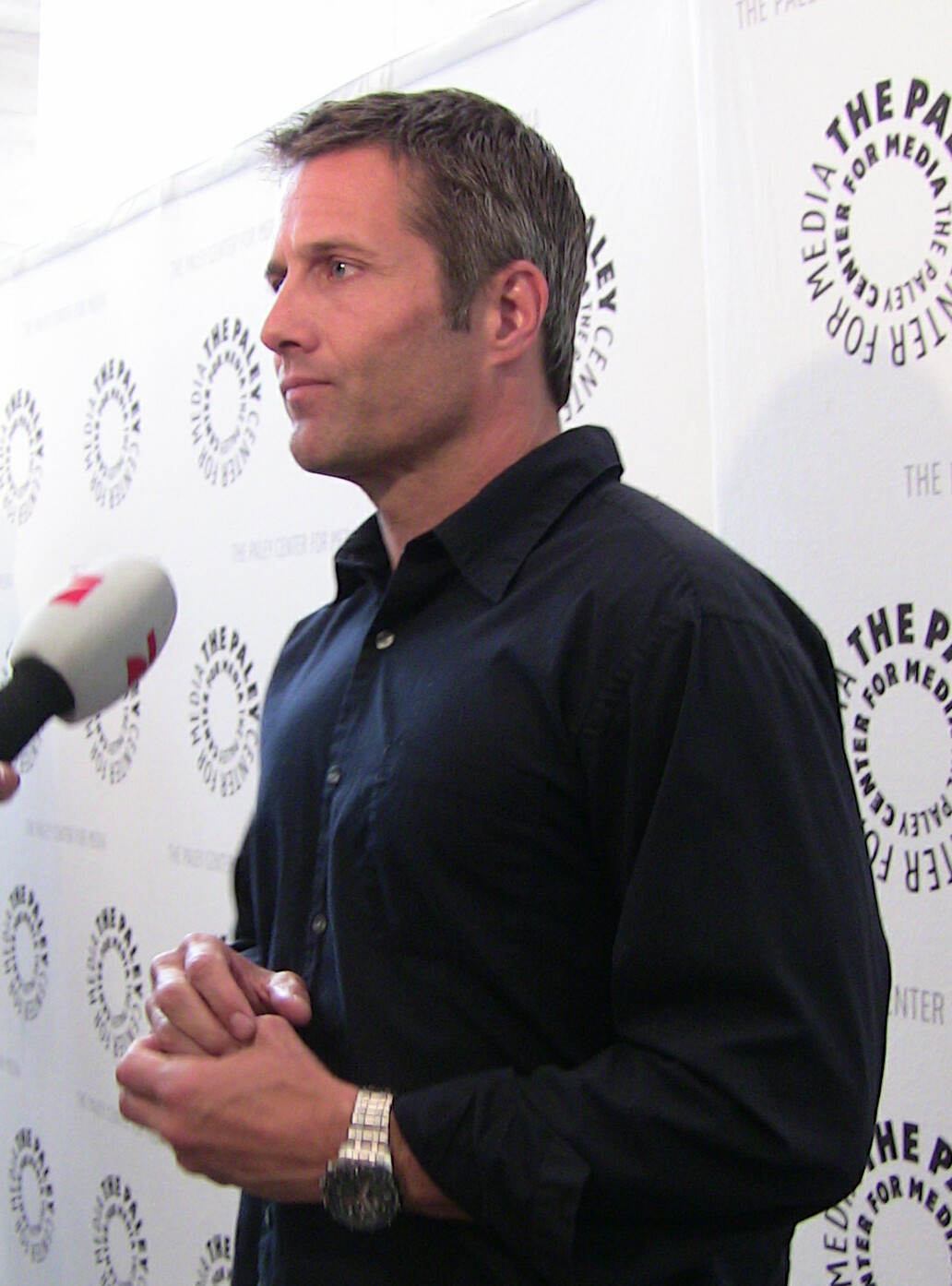
Rob Estes portrays high school principal and father Harry Wilson.

Portrayed by Rob Estes in seasons one and two, Harry Wilson is the son of Tabitha Wilson, Kelly Taylor's old neighbor, and a graduate of West Beverly Hills High. He decides to move back to Beverly Hills, accepting a position as the principal at his old high school. He was revealed in season one to have dated Naomi Clark's mother, Tracy Clark, in high school, and also fathered an illegitimate son with her who was put up for adoption many years ago. During season 2, Harry's marriage with Debbie becomes more strained and unstable due to her jealousy and unpredictability. After season 2 ends, after Harry loses his job and is unable to deal with Debbie's anger or his kids', Annie and Dixon, legal and personal problems, he leaves his family for good.

In season 3, Harry is not seen but it is said that he and Debbie have filed for divorce which is granted quickly. When Dixon and Annie go to visit him at his new house somewhere in Los Angeles, they are surprised to meet his new girlfriend. They leave without seeing him and from there on fall out of touch with Harry.

In season 4, Harry is briefly mentioned in the Thanksgiving episode to be living somewhere in New Mexico at a commune with his new girlfriend, whom he apparently married. From this point onward, Harry is never mentioned again in the series and he no longer keeps in touch with Annie, Dixon or anyone else in his family, and vice versa.

The reason for Harry never being seen again in the series after the second season is that Estes left the series at the end of season 2. He said in a statement regarding his exit, "This is my final season on 90210 and I wish the show, cast and crew nothing but the best. I am looking forward to spending time with my kids and exploring other opportunities."

=== Ethan Ward ===
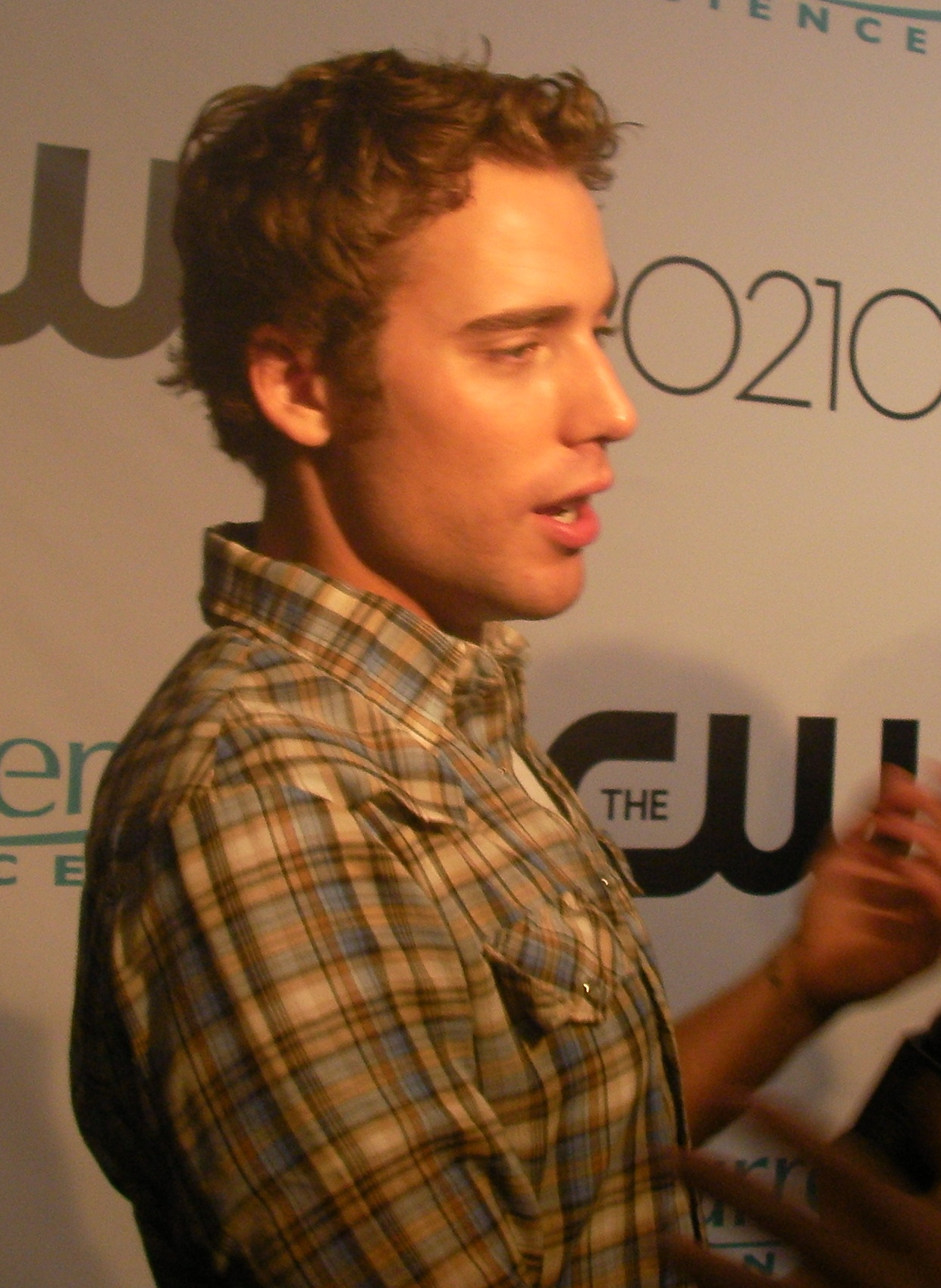
Dustin Milligan was the first actor to be cast. He portrays lacrosse star Ethan Ward during the first season.

Played by Dustin Milligan in season one, Ethan is introduced as a lacrosse star and top athlete of West Beverly Hills High. He has a brother who is autistic. He dates Naomi at the beginning of season 1, although the pair break up several times before ending their relationship permanently. He and Dixon are rivals at first, but eventually become friends. Although Ethan is attracted to Annie and kissed her two summers before the start of the show, he does not become her boyfriend until the episode "There Is No Place Like Homecoming." Ethan seems to carry traits of Dylan McKay from the original series since he dated both Annie and Naomi, just like Dylan dated both Kelly and Brenda. In "By Accident" he is involved in a car accident. Ethan's self-absorption is revealed when he does not recognize Rhonda, the girl in the other car, even though they are in the same French class. He befriends Rhonda in an attempt to reform. When he overhears Annie presenting Rhonda's painful story as her own, he becomes angry and spends the Valentine's dance with Rhonda. However, when Rhonda attempts to kiss Ethan, he refuses her and clarifies that he is still going out with Annie. Ethan and Annie finally break up after agreeing that all their relationship has become is a constant fight. Even though Ethan confirms to Annie that he believes that he and Rhonda had a connection, he also says that he is not going to date her, instead taking time for himself. Over the past few episodes, Ethan has been developing a friendship with Liam, which has had a negative influence on his "good-boy image." At the end of the episode "The Dionysian Debacle", Naomi's older sister Jen reveals that Ethan lost his virginity to her and not to Naomi or implying that he dated her before dating Naomi, but promises to keep it a secret. In "Zero Tolerance" it is hinted that Ethan may have feelings for Silver. In the season finale, Dixon forces Ethan to reveal that he does too, like Silver. They kiss and Ethan points out that Silver ran after him and not Dixon. In season 2 he texts Silver from Montana and said that he didn't regret that kiss. Dixon was told this by new character 'Teddy Montgomery' and Dixon ended things with Silver. In the season 2 episode "To New Beginnings", He sends a text stating he moved to Montana to live with his father.

=== Tabitha Wilson ===
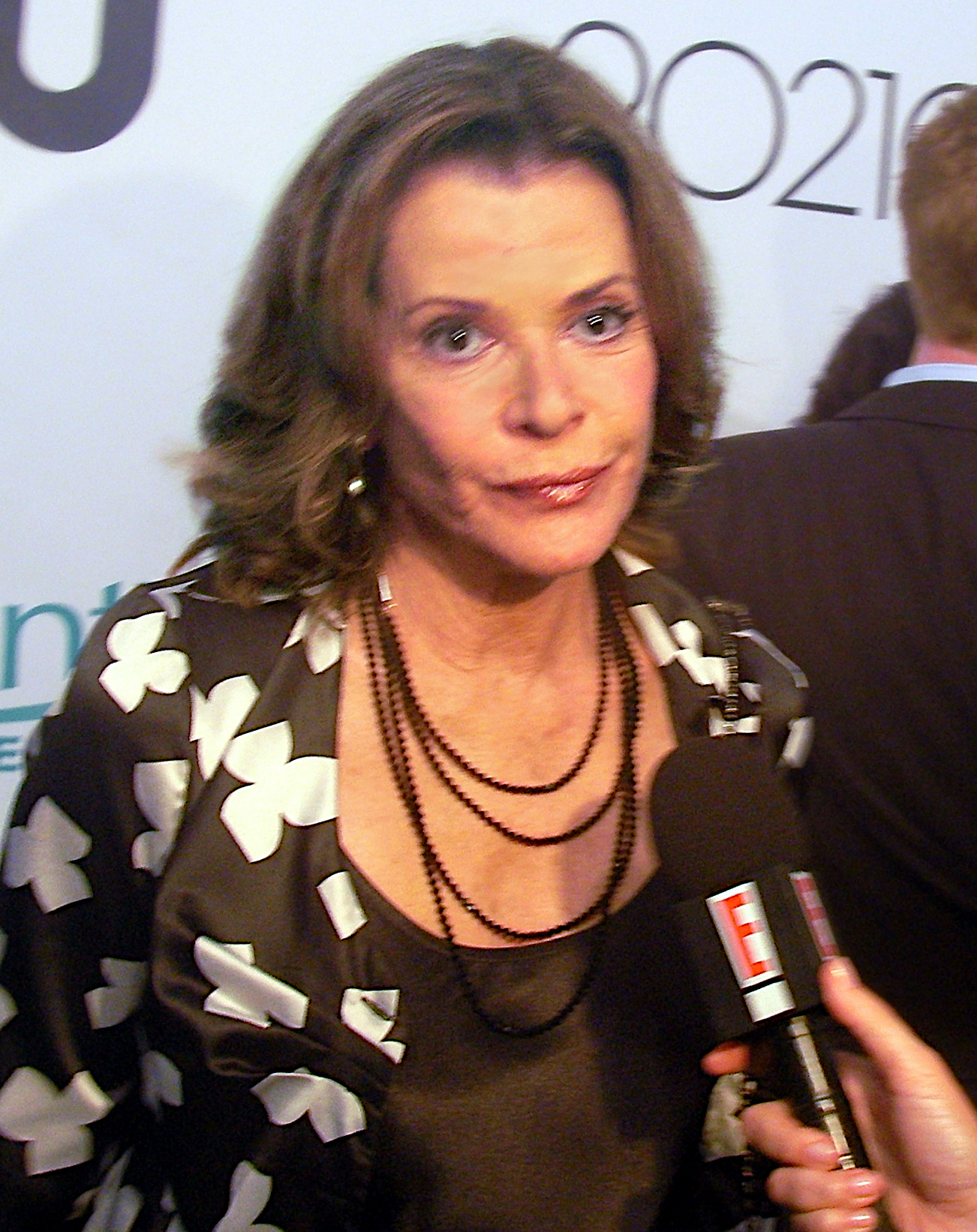
Jessica Walter portrays television and theater actress Tabitha Wilson.

Played by Jessica Walter for the first 13 episodes of the series. Tabitha Wilson is the matriarch of the family and Harry Wilson's mother, is an actress (and alcoholic) around the age of 60, who was very famous during the 1970s. She is the cause of the Wilson family's departure from Kansas. She doesn't get along too well with Debbie, often clashing about house rules. Tabitha was written off the show as returning to do television and movie work that took her away from Beverly Hills. In season 2, episode 1 "To New Beginnings", it was explained that she is working in Las Vegas. Later in the season, Annie and Dixon go to visit her over Winter Break, though this is not shown on screen. Despite this, the producers said that they will like Jessica to come back to the series as a guest star, even though it never happened after her last appearance.

Critics enjoyed Jessica Walter's dialogue, with one citing it as "one of the main reasons to watch the series."

=== Adrianna Tate-Duncan ===
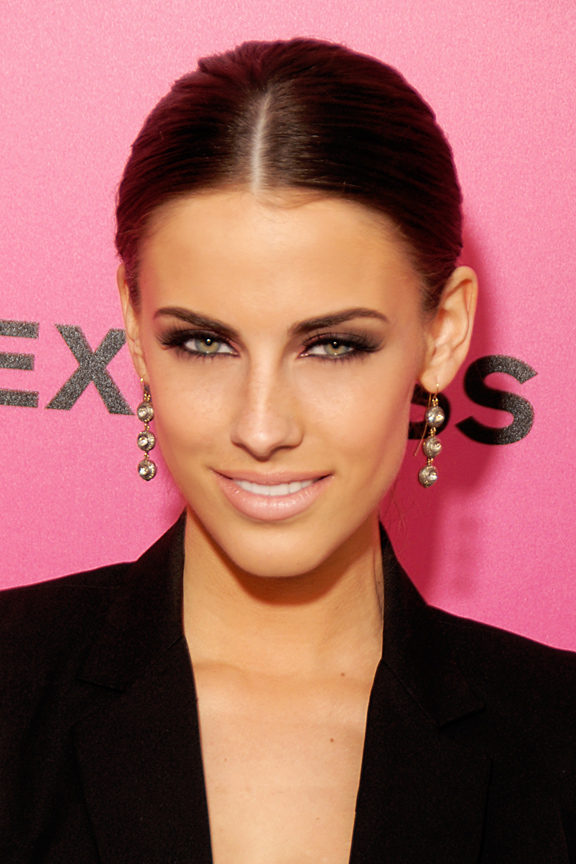
Jessica Lowndes portrays troubled teenager and former drug addict turned singer, Adrianna Tate-Duncan.

Portrayed by Jessica Lowndes as a recurring character for the first thirteen episodes of season one and as a main character since the fourteenth episode, Adrianna is a theater student who is Naomi Clark's best friend. She suffers from a serious drug addiction and is under a lot of strain from her mother to further her career. After she overdoses, she receives help for her drug addiction from Navid, who pays for her to go to a renowned rehab center for the best treatment possible. As a result, she starts spending more time with him and they begin a relationship. In the middle of season 1, She finds out she is pregnant and later gives the baby up for adoption.

In season 2, after she feels she has lost everything when she left Navid for Teddy, she relapses on drugs. Adrianna later recovers and starts her musical career under Ivy's mother, Laurel Cooper. In the season finale, she gets back together with Navid and leaves school to go on tour with Javier. She returns after the summer and gets into a car crash, in which Javier is killed. Adrianna steals his book of songs as he had told her that her career was over. She begins recording and releasing Javier's music as her own and gradually becomes selfish and self-centered, causing her to lose Navid. When she finds out Navid has been having an affair with Silver, she seeks revenge and sends a topless picture of her around school and later switches Silver's bipolar medication for placebos, causing her to be shunned from the group. She later realizes she wants to be better person, and vows to do so.

She dates Dixon and he finds her a job at Liam's bar. Soon she and Silver become friends again and forgive each other.

Dixon and Adrianna decide to produce a song. After producing it and sending to producers, they get notes saying that his songs might be better with Adrianna in it. So, they decide to work together on making songs.

=== Liam Court ===
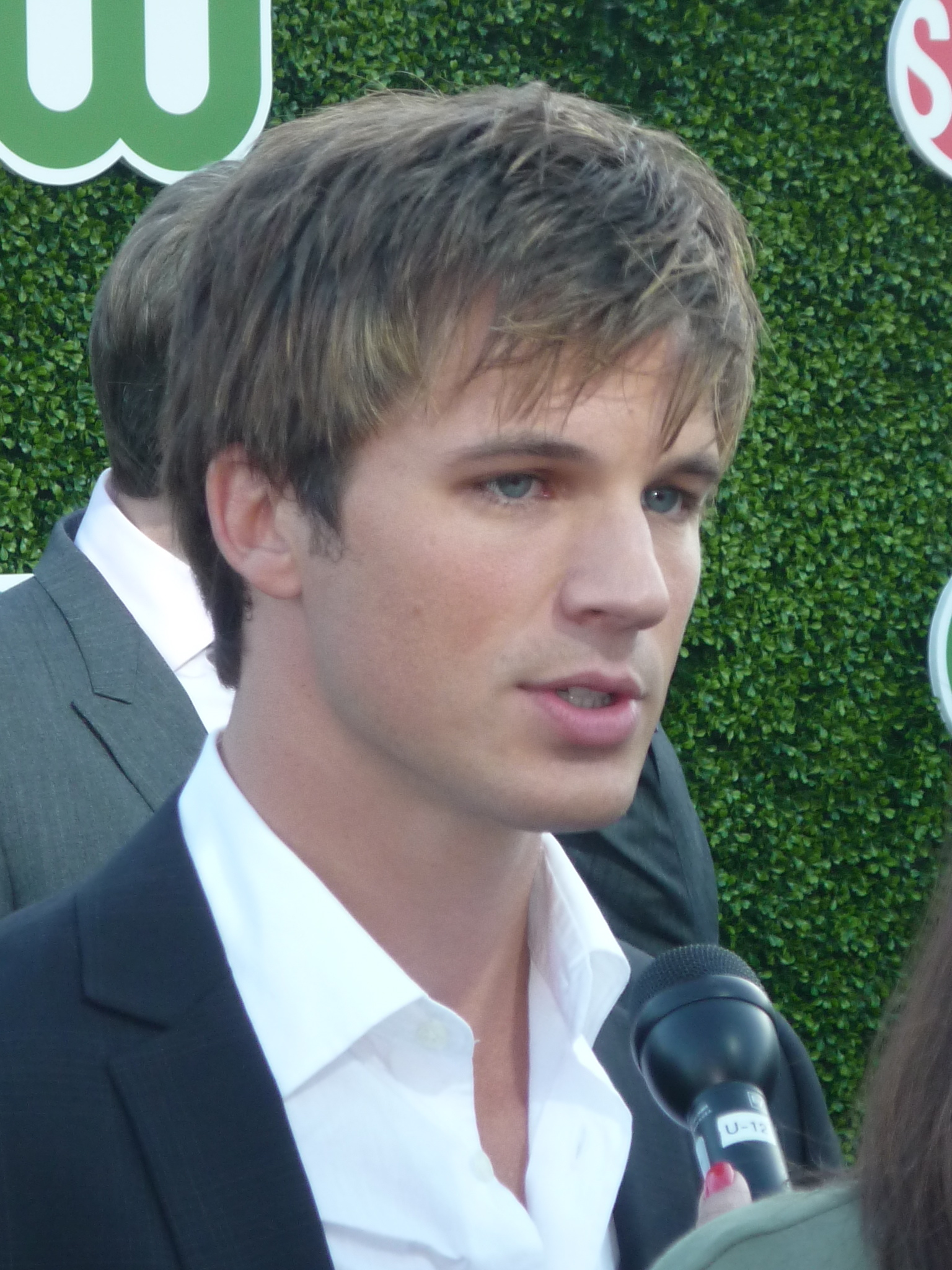
Matt Lanter portrays Liam Court. Originally a recurring character but was upgraded to series regular status from season two.

Played by Matt Lanter as a recurring character in season one and a main character since season two, Liam is a rebellious boy from Long Island, New York who meets Naomi originally when he was the bartender of the hotel where she was staying. He is eventually revealed to be a high school student after Naomi sends a bottle of champagne to his house and his mother finds out he wasn't enrolled at West Beverly. Not long afterwards, Liam takes Naomi to a drag race where he shows a quick temper when another man starts hitting on Naomi, and smashes his car windshield. They have their first kiss at the end of the date in his car. Following complaints about his grades and considerations for military school, Liam's guidance counselor suggests that in addition to bringing up his grades he joins some school activities. This prompts him to invite Naomi to prom. When the guidance counselor tells Liam how glad he is to see him at prom, Naomi begins to question his reasons for inviting her and whether or not he likes her. With Naomi's constant pressuring, he reveals that he does in fact like Naomi. Liam shares private events in his past with Naomi which she then shares with her sister Jen. Jen walks over to Liam, pretending to be a neighbor and tells him that Naomi told everyone. Out of spite, he ends up sleeping with her sister, Jen, during the prom night. When Naomi goes to the same room and finds a scarf that looks like one that belongs to Annie, she accuses Annie of sleeping with her boyfriend and Annie gets to Naomi's bad side who in return sends out the sext that mark took of Annie. After getting angry with her over telling his secrets to who he thinks is just a random girl (but is really Naomi's sister). At the end of the season, he is shown being "manhandled" and presumably taken off to military school. Liam, in a sense, is a tougher version of Dylan McKay from the original series.

At the beginning of season 2, he is seen standing behind Naomi demanding she hear him out because he needs to talk to him, he looks very fit there. She runs away crying and he never gets the chance to talk to her. In season two he is determined to open Naomi's eyes to see how evil her sister is. With the help of Dixon, Teddy and his new friend with benefits, Ivy, they prove Annie is innocent. After she finds out, she goes to talk to Liam but sees Ivy kissing Liam. Liam and Naomi talk after Ivy texts Naomi. Liam shows Naomi the boat that he is building. He tells her that whenever he is angry, he works on the boat. Then, Naomi decides to give Liam another chance by sharing a kiss. Liam later catches his stepfather kissing another woman and confronts him by punching him. He then leaves home and moves in with Naomi. Liam thinks that Naomi was sexually harassed by Mr. Cannon and confronts him, calling him a piece of garbage. Liam is sent to Mr. Wilson's office and is about to kick Liam out of school unless he tells him why he confronted Mr. Cannon. Liam refuses to talk, believing he would be betraying Naomi. Naomi walks in and gives the reason, that Mr. Cannon sexually harassed her. At a hearing, Naomi feels guilty and tells the truth and Liam moves back in with his mother and stepfather, preferring to be there than with Naomi. He then sees his birth father, who just got out of prison, wanting to reconnect with him. His father wanted Liam to move in with him and run a bait shop together, so Liam steals some coins from his stepfather's coin collection so they would have the money. However, his father later abandons him. Later, he goes to Annie's house to do their homework, but sees how messed up Annie's parents really are. They go out for fresh air, as Annie and Liam have a moment and it seems they were about to kiss. However, she tells him he should go with Naomi. Liam takes her advice and gets back together with Naomi. In "Meet the Parent", Naomi and Liam both start to get distracted as things go on, which Liam tries telling Naomi but keeps being interrupted by her; Naomi keeps telling her side of the story, not paying attention to what Liam is trying to tell her.

Liam tells Naomi that she has no idea what is going on his life, and she agrees that she should pay more attention and she will never ignore him again. Liam calls Naomi and she hangs up on him, claiming she is sick. Tired of his problems being ignored by Naomi, Liam calls Annie to talk. After a while, they become friends and start to develop feelings for each other. Liam likes Annie because, contrarily to Naomi, she listens to what he has to say. And Annie starts to develop feelings for Liam too. Later on, Liam is having dinner with his mother and finds out she's trying to hire another housekeeper, and that she was accused of stealing the coins that Liam took. In need, he turns to Annie for advice, and he and Naomi steadily grow apart. In the season 2 finale Liam breaks up with Naomi then takes Annie on his newly finished boat. After Annie confesses to Liam about her killing Jasper's uncle she decides to tell her parents. As she does this Liam sees that his boat is on fire and spots Jasper, who's on crutches, trying to get away. Seeing this he takes down Jasper and starts to brutally hit him repeatedly as the police arrives.

In the first episode of the third season, Liam develops feelings for Annie, and kisses her. But Annie rejects him after almost getting her into trouble with the police. It is revealed he has a half-brother; Charlie, who Annie begins dating. Liam doesn't like Charlie, but after a heart-to-heart conversation about how they were mistreated during their childhood, they reconcile. Later when Liam is injured and Annie is left to look after him, they kiss after Liam admits he loves her. Although Annie is still in a relationship, she says she couldn't live without him and they sleep together. After Charlie discovers that Annie has true feelings for Liam, he leaves to study abroad in France. Annie and Liam start dating. Afterwards, Annie's cousin Emily moves in for a while at the Wilsons' but Annie doesn't really appreciate it and that's why Emily decides to take over things in Annie's life and then tries to seduce Liam. He realizes she is trying to hurt Annie and works on a plan to expose her. In the season finale, Liam tells Annie right before graduation that he decided not to attend college. Annie who doesn't understand his choice breaks up with him. At Ivy's bachelorette party, Liam tells Annie that he got a job on a fishing boat and that he is leaving the next day for the whole summer. At the end, while everyone dances at the wedding, she realizes she has been foolish and runs after him. The two reconcile, kiss, and then he leaves.

At the beginning of Season 4, Liam returns from his fishing job and, unexpectedly, asks Annie to marry him; but she refuses. After a second, more lavish proposal, which Annie says 'no' again, Liam gets drunk and ends up buying a beach bar. Details of his summer on the boat are revealed as a woman named Jane arrives, whose husband died whilst on the boat with Liam. Liam begins to develop feelings for Jane. It was later revealed that Jane is pregnant with her husband's child. Her husband is also revealed to be alive. Once Jane finds out, she ends her relationship with Liam.

With the bar having trouble staying afloat, Liam takes a modeling job. It paid thousands of dollars, so he signs with an agency, and he receives another job. As a sign of rebellion he jump starts a race car, and when trying to escape he falls off a fence and breaks his leg.

In the mid-season finale, Liam is hit by a car while riding in his motorcycle. The woman who hit him, introducing herself as Vanessa, decides to say it was a hit and run; she then stays with Liam and they end up dating. Annie soon works out what has happened and tells Liam. He doesn't mind, however, and he and Vanessa they carry on dating. She then transforms the bar totally. At first Liam isn't happy about this intrusion in his personal space, but he then becomes optimistic, and thanks her for taking in it hand. Liam then finds out from Annie that Vanessa is a con artist who paid a girl to pretend to drown so Liam could be noticed in the TV industry. When Liam confronts Vanessa with the suspicions that she is using him for her own advantages, she leaves him, but takes most of his money with her. Vanessa returns at the end of the season and threatens to sue Liam because she had earlier tricked him into signing a contract by making herself as his personal manager and wants him to continues his acting career, so Vanessa can continue to live off Liam's movie salary.

In season 5, Vanessa continues to blackmail Liam and instigate herself into his life until after an argument with him she falls off a balcony at his beachfront house and disappears. Thinking that he killed Vanessa, Liam tries to keep the incident a secret until he begins receiving anonymous letters from an extortionist threatening to reveal his crime. Liam is later approached by a woman named Ashley who offers to be his personal bodyguard, but Liam is unaware that Ashley is an obsessed fan who ends up kidnapping and holding him hostage in the basement of the Offshore Bar. With Liam missing, Annie teams up with Vanessa, who was Liam's stalker all along, to look for him and attempting to stop Ashley, she shoots Annie. When Annie later recovers, Liam finds old feelings for her returning.

In the final episode of the series, Liam proposes to Annie telling her that he always loved her and that he won't take 'no' for an answer this time and the two became engaged happily, Naomi sent the happy couple picture of Liam and Annie and sent it to all their friends which we see each character surprised and excited for the couple, at the end we see Liam and Annie hug as he picks her up.

=== Ivy Sullivan ===
Played by Gillian Zinser in a recurring role in season two and a main role in seasons three and four, Ivy Sullivan is a blonde tomboy surfer chick, student at West Beverly Hills High School and lives in a large house at Topanga Canyon. She is very sensitive and hates being underestimated. When she first met Liam, the two got in a fight when they have a car accident. They later reconcile at a Halloween Party and start to be friends. She starts to develop feelings for him, but she is desperate when he only sees a good friend in her and will try to catch his attention. Teddy sees that she has a crush on Liam but she will not admit it. After a party, at Liam's basement, the two kiss and start a discreet love story of Ivy helping him overcome his nemesis, Jen Clark. Liam eventually asks her to a dance, but it soon becomes apparent that has his eyes set on fellow student Naomi Clark. Ivy then decides it is best for her and Liam to merely be friends, assisting him in his pursuit of Naomi by texting her to go and see Liam. She is devastated after losing the man she loved. Later, Naomi and Ivy try to form a friendly relationship of their own which proves difficult when they don't share the same interests at all. The two girls get in a fight on the beach and start to hate each other. After losing Liam for good, Ivy is comforted by her hippie mother Laurel Cooper, a music producer. Later, she starts fake dating with Dixon, as the two feel left out, they kiss to prove to Naomi that they are really dating. Dixon develops some feelings for Ivy but she wants to break up as she thinks she still has a chance with Liam. Later Liam tells her that he and she will never be together again. Later in the episode, Ivy decides to give Dixon a shot and go on a real date with him. Now that Ivy knows that she and Liam will never be, she is able to move on. With Dixon's gambling issues their first date is catastrophic and Ivy begins to ask herself if Dixon is really the guy for her. Their relationship recovers when Dixon is invited to Australia in the episode before the season finale.

In season 3, Ivy returns from Australia with an old friend, Oscar, who Dixon becomes immediately jealous of. Dixon asks Ivy why she never opens up to him, when he tells her about his family problems and his past. She decides to trust him and tells him about her estranged father. She also tells him that she is a virgin. After a romantic date, she decides to lose her virginity to him, but their plans are put on hold when Sasha returns with bad news for Dixon. He learns that she is HIV positive and he might have it. He decides to push Ivy away and he breaks up with her. After being dumped by Dixon in episode 5, feeling hurt and confused, she loses her virginity to Oscar. Finding out he doesn't have HIV, Dixon tells Ivy the news, and she is shocked. She receives more shocking news when she finds out Oscar was also sleeping with her mother Laurel, and that it was all a plan to get back at them for ruining his family. Dixon then discovers that Ivy slept with Oscar as he dumps her again. Oscar then tries to go out with Naomi but Naomi and Ivy make a plan to put Oscar on total embarrassment in front of everyone at a party by stealing his clothes when he went skinny dipping. Naomi (along with the rest of the girls) and Ivy become really good friends from this point on. Ivy then gets into an accident while surfing and Dixon saves her life. She asks him out, but he turns her down, saying he is still hurt after finding out about her and Oscar. She begins to smoke marijuana, as it helps her calm down. She then befriends a boy named Raj, whom she met at a store. They hang out, as they have many similarities (as in smoking pot and skateboarding). When Raj learns that Ivy has been blowing off school to hang out with him, he tells her he doesn't want to be a bad influence on her and shares that he has cancer and has four years at the most to live. He also tells her that he smokes the pot to help him with the pain from his chemotherapy. The news shocks Ivy, and becomes an eye opener for her. At the end of season three, Ivy marries Raj shortly after her graduation from high school.

In season 4, Raj finds out that the treatment didn't work and decides to end things. He tells Ivy the only reason they got married was that he was dying, and that they can't be together anymore. He does not tell her that the cancer and leukemia is still there though.

After recovering from Raj leaving her, Ivy runs into a boy named Diego as she's handing out flyers for her art show. When she tells Diego about the art show, she later finds out that he vandalizes the studio where her art was. She gets mad at him, but eventually, Diego shows her the injustice in art and gets her interested. Diego and Ivy go out and post street art and eventually they become a couple. Sometime later, when Dixon is leaving the hospital in "The Heart Will Go On", Dixon discovers that Raj was rushed to the Emergency Room because of his cancer and he was under the label DNR. Dixon tells Ivy and she visits him in the hospital. Ivy at first gets mad at Raj but in the end they act like a married couple. When Ivy steps out of the hospital room to get Raj a glass of water, she comes back to discover he has passed. The next episode, "Blue Ivy", Ivy goes to the funeral for Raj. Navid comes back from Princeton to go to the funeral as well. Raj's mother offers Ivy Raj's ashes and at first she doesn't accept them. Ivy talks to Caleb and he tells her about a mourning event he experienced in Ireland, and she decides to have one on the beach. After everyone around the campfire says all the great things about Raj, Ivy breaks down crying about the negative things Raj did to her and that she deserved more. Her friends console her, and in the end of the episode, Ivy becomes suicidal and she is seen going into the dangerous ocean late at night. Ivy's last words before going in is, "nothing lasts forever"

When Caleb learns that Ivy is on a suicidal decline and indifferent to life, he has the state forcibly commit her to a psychiatric hospital where she soon runs away with a little of Diego's help. Diego persuades Ivy to express herself by spray painting graffiti as an outlet for her feelings as he does. They soon get caught by the police where Diego tells Ivy that he is an undocumented immigrant and he goes on the run. After pulling herself together, Ivy tracks down the fugitive Diego and offers to help him stay in the country, but when her plan fails and Diego gets deported back to Mexico, Ivy decides to leave everything and everyone she knows behind and join him. In the final episode of Season 4, Ivy is last seen at an airport buying a one-way ticket to Mexico City to presumably join Diego and start a new life with him in Mexico.

Zinser left the show after contract negotiations for season 5 went south.

=== Teddy Montgomery ===
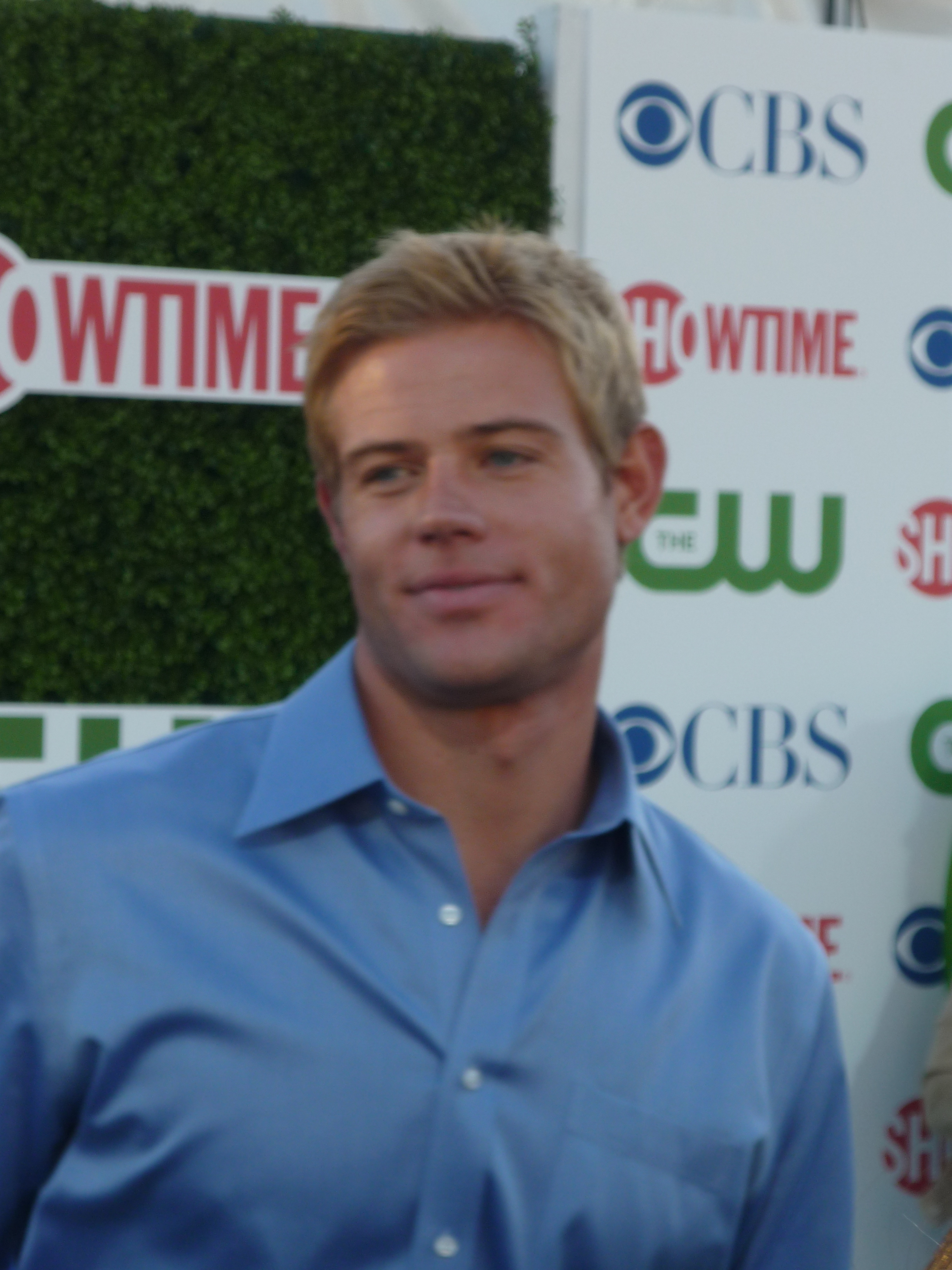
Trevor Donovan portrays tennis player and openly gay student Teddy Montgomery. Originally a recurring character but was upgraded to series regular status from season three.

Played by Trevor Donovan in a recurring role in seasons two, four ane fifth and a series regular in season 3, Teddy is a tennis player and son of famous actor Spence Montgomery. He is introduced to the series as a womanizer, who causes Navid and Adrianna to break up early in season 2. Teddy later integrates with the group and forms a friendship and later relationship with Silver, as they both their similar stories of how their mothers have died, despite her originally disliking him. Teddy could be compared to Steve Sanders from the original 1990s series Beverly Hills, 90210. They both have very famous wealthy parents and have trouble dealing with that fact, along with both being egotistical womanizers.

He originally moved back to Beverly Hills from prep school on the east coast as he said that he had taken the fall for his roommates' actions. In season 3, he reveals that he really left as he began to develop feelings for his roommate, Tripp. In season 3, Teddy struggles as he begins to realize he's gay, after failing to perform with women and a drunken one-night stand with Ian. At first, he intimidates and persecutes Ian for knowing his secret, but soon they begin to secretly date, and Teddy even comes out to his friends after a blackmailer threatens to expose their relationship. He then finds out it was Ian who was blackmailing him to force him out of the closet, and the two then break up. On a trip to Mexico, Teddy bumps into Tripp, his old roommate from boarding school and, after revealing he is gay as well, the two then have a one-night stand. When Teddy discovers that Tripp is still a player, and in an open relationship, Teddy realizes that he wants to enter into a serious relationship, and begins dating Marco. By the time of prom, he and Marco are an established couple, and after Teddy wins prom king he dances with Marco in front of his peers.

By season 4, Teddy's role was Upped to a Main, as Trevor Donovan had been upgraded to Main status. He and Marco have broken up. Teddy has an on-off relationship with a fling he met on vacation, Shane, but they clash over their differing political beliefs. Silver and Teddy's close bond is tested when Silver inadvertently reveals his homosexuality to his family, jeopardizing his conservative uncle's political campaign. After being snubbed by his family, Teddy makes peace with Silver and moves to Washington, D.C., with Shane. He returns in the season 4 finale as Silver asks him to be the father of her child.

=== Kelly Taylor ===
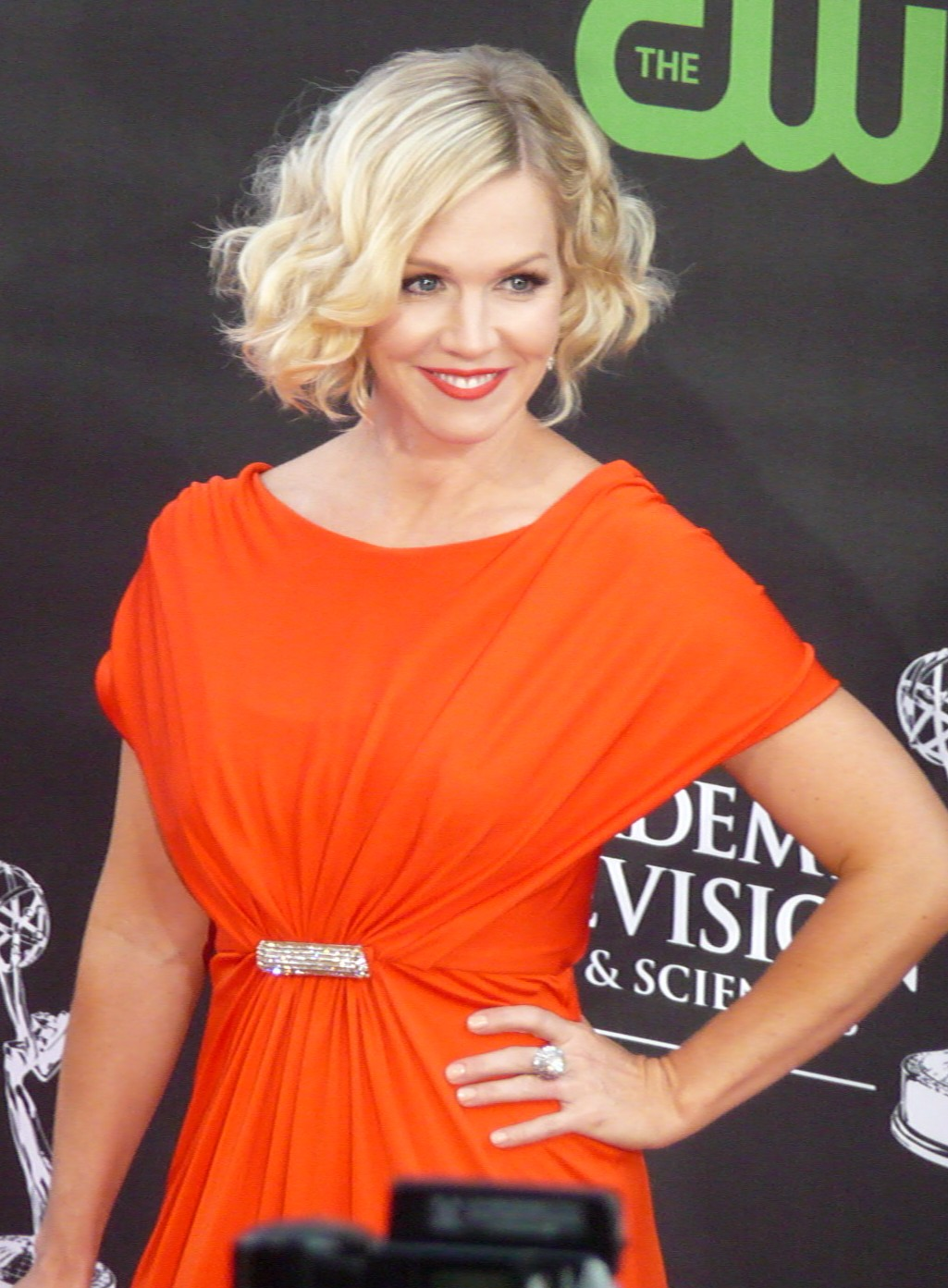
Jennie Garth reprised her role as Kelly Taylor for 20 episodes over the course of seasons one and two.

Portrayed by Jennie Garth for most of season one and five episodes in season two. Kelly became a guidance counselor at West Beverly Hills High after earning a master's degree in Psychology. Along with Dylan McKay, she is the parent of a four-year-old son named Sammy, and has a romantic interest in Ryan Matthews. She falls out with Brenda after finding out she slept with Ryan but the two later make peace. She raises Sammy alone and feels it's her duty to look after her half-sister Erin Silver after their mother died of breast cancer.

=== Brenda Walsh ===
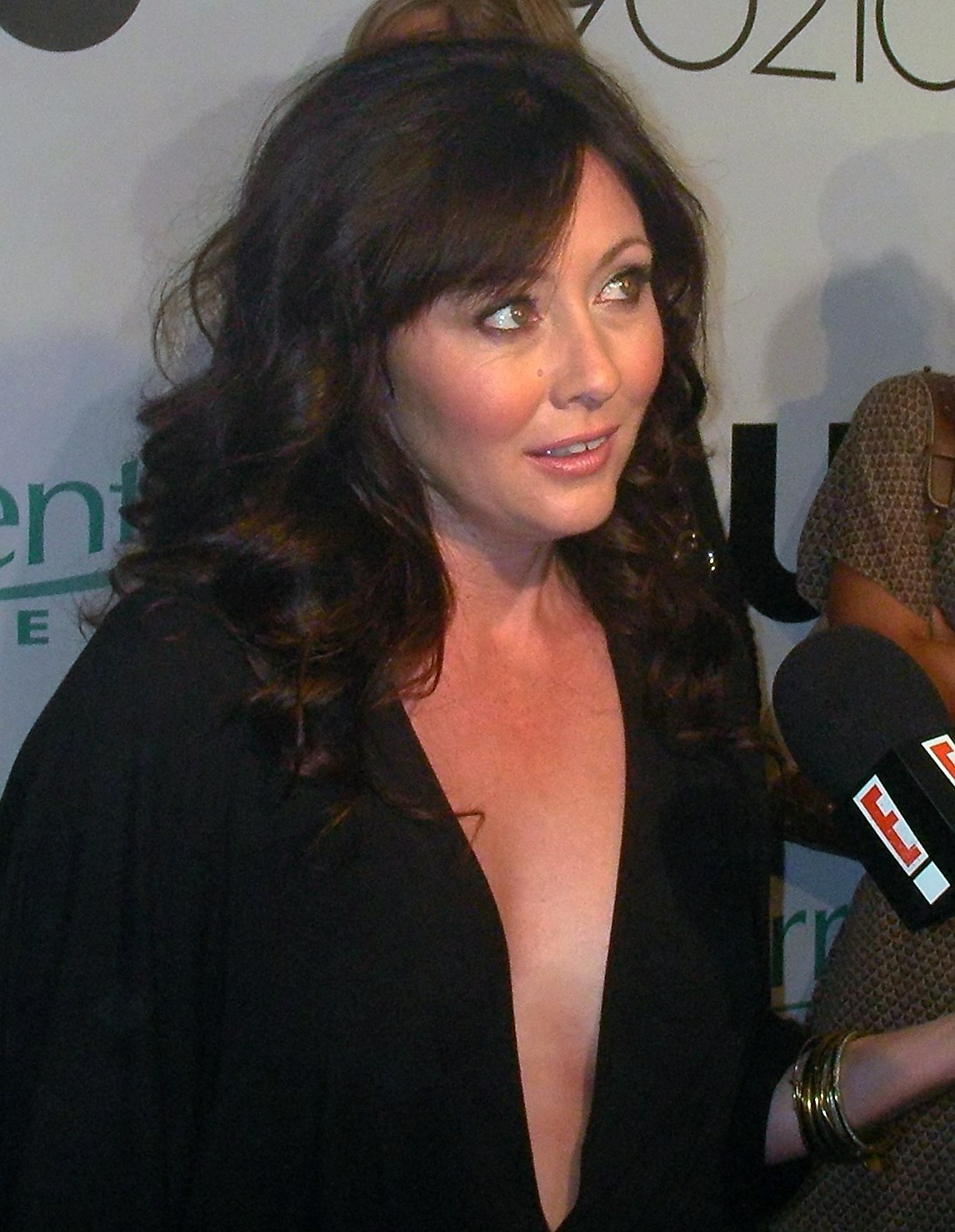
Shannen Doherty guest starred as her old Beverly Hills, 90210 character Brenda Walsh during the first season.

Played by Shannen Doherty in season one, Brenda returns to Beverly Hills to star in a play and takes the opportunity to spend time with Kelly after gaining success as a theater actress and stage director in London. She subsequently agrees to direct a high school musical at West Beverly Hills High when the original director is no longer available. Her relationship with Kelly along with both women's lingering feelings for Dylan have become focal points for the two best friends. Brenda then finds out that she can never become pregnant. She tries to hide this fact from Kelly by trying to push her away. It is later known that she slept with Ryan. She finally tells Kelly this when she finds out that Adrianna is pregnant. In the season finale, Brenda returns and offers her support to Adrianna who is having a baby. Meanwhile, the viewer discovers Brenda had adopted a baby girl from China. Shannen Doherty has revealed in an interview that plans for her character's return have been scrapped.

=== Jen Clark ===
Jennifer "Jen" Clark, played by Sara Foster since season one, is Naomi's older sister who has been away for most of the series. Her existence was brought up in the pilot episode, when Naomi tries to convince her mother that "She's as smart as Jen." In other episodes, Naomi reveals that they are not on speaking terms. Jen comes back to Beverly Hills in the episode "The Dionsyian Debacle". It is revealed later in the episode that she took Ethan's virginity. The viewer find outs that Jen is a student at Yale University and studies art history in Paris and lived in Nice for a while. She gets romantically involved with Ryan Matthews and skirmishes with Kelly Taylor, who claims that Jen stole a paper from another girl in high school in order to become the valedictorian of her graduating class. Jen appears to be broke, as she states to Ryan that she blew through a million dollars in 2 months, and also by the fact that she maxed out Naomi's credit card. In "Zero Tolerance," Jen gets a phone call from who is known to be her husband Olivier, who Jen wants a divorce from. In the same episode, Jen confronts Kelly about her sending a recommendation letter in which she characterized Jen as a narcissist with no moral compass. Kelly then warns Ryan about Jen's devious personality by telling him that Jen is a "compulsive liar, and practically a sociopath." Ryan however pays no attention to this, and generalizes the statement as jealousy from Kelly's part. In the season 1 finale, she tricks Liam into thinking that she is Naomi's neighbor and sleeps with him. In season 2, Jen continues to manipulate Naomi into giving her more money, and she begins a relationship with Matthews. In reality, however, she has no real interest in Matthews. Rather, she merely uses him to convince other rich men that she is not a gold digger. However, the truth about her night with Liam is revealed to Naomi and she loses everything, including Ryan and Naomi. She later returns to Beverly Hills, and tells Naomi that she's the new owner of the Beverly Hills Beach Club. It is revealed that Jen is six years older than Naomi. In episode 21 of season 2, she shows Naomi her pregnant belly and says "You're going to be an auntie." Matthews is the biological father, but Jen tells him that she does not need his support. She is eventually put on bedrest by her physician and must rely on Matthews after her personal assistant quits due to her unreasonable demands. She grows softer after giving birth to a boy she names "Jacques" though she is shown to be inept at childcare. Ryan moves in with her to help care for the child, but one night finds the house deserted and a note from Jen saying she has left since she is a bad mother. Although manipulative and cunning, she is shown to be very intelligent, having knowledge of Aristophanes and his works. In addition, she is shown to have an interest in reading. In season 3, Jen overhears Naomi and Silver talking over the baby monitor and learns Mr. Cannon raped Naomi. This angers Jen and she plans to kill Mr. Cannon, but decides not to after Naomi asks her not to do so.

== Supporting characters ==
The following is a list of characters that are, or at one time were, a recurring guest over the three seasons of the series. They are listed in the order that they first appeared on the show.

=== Tracy Clark ===
Portrayed by Christina Moore during season one, Tracy Clark is a brash and vivacious woman from upper-class society. She is the mother of Naomi Clark and her sister Jen, both of whom she had with her wealthy husband Charles. At the beginning of the series, Tracy also claimed to have a son whom she'd given up for adoption during her younger years. In revealing this, she also told her ex-boyfriend Harry Wilson that he was the father. This prompted him to investigate further. A shaken Naomi later told Tracy that she'd seen Charles kissing another woman. To Naomi's surprise, Tracy identified the woman as Gail. She then explained that the affair had been going on for two years, but only on an occasional basis. Not wanting to separate the family or lose her life of luxury, Tracy had chosen to tolerate Charles's unfaithful ways. However, Naomi soon learns that Charles intended to move Gail into the family's beach house, and reveals this to her mother. Upon realizing that Charles's interest in Gail was greater than she'd thought, Tracy begins to have a change of heart regarding the matter. She soon reveals to Naomi that she and Charles are divorcing. Afterwards, she takes Naomi in her arms and openly stated that she loves her. Sean Cavanaugh, a young man who claims to be Tracy's son with Harry, soon arrives in Beverly Hills and introduces himself to the Clarks and the Wilsons, staying with the latter family while in town. Harry's daughter Annie and his wife Debbie eventually begin growing suspicious of Sean's identity, particularly when Annie overhears one of his phone calls. Sean then claims that he was being harassed by men who wanted him to pay his adopted father's gambling debt, and that going to the authorities for help would be risky. When Harry and Tracy offers to give Sean the money, Debbie and Annie confronts Harry and requested a paternity test. Sean agrees, but suddenly leaves town the next morning without telling anyone. It is also revealed that he'd received a degree of money from the Clark family. This led the Wilsons, Naomi, and a reluctant Tracy to conclude that Sean was not who he claimed to be, but someone who'd intended to scam them. It is later revealed that the real name of Harry and Tracy's son is named Mark Holland.

=== Charles Clark ===
Charles Clark, portrayed by James Patrick Stuart in the first season, is Naomi's uptight, businessman father, who spoils his daughter and gets her whatever she wants. He is spotted having an affair by Naomi. When she confronts her mother she discovers she already knew and has known for a long time. He and his wife decide to get divorced, so he can be with Gail, much to the disappointment of Naomi and is once again spotted having affair with his realtor. When Jen returned from France she told Naomi that their father had agreed to hand over control of Naomi's finances to her.

=== Ty Collins ===
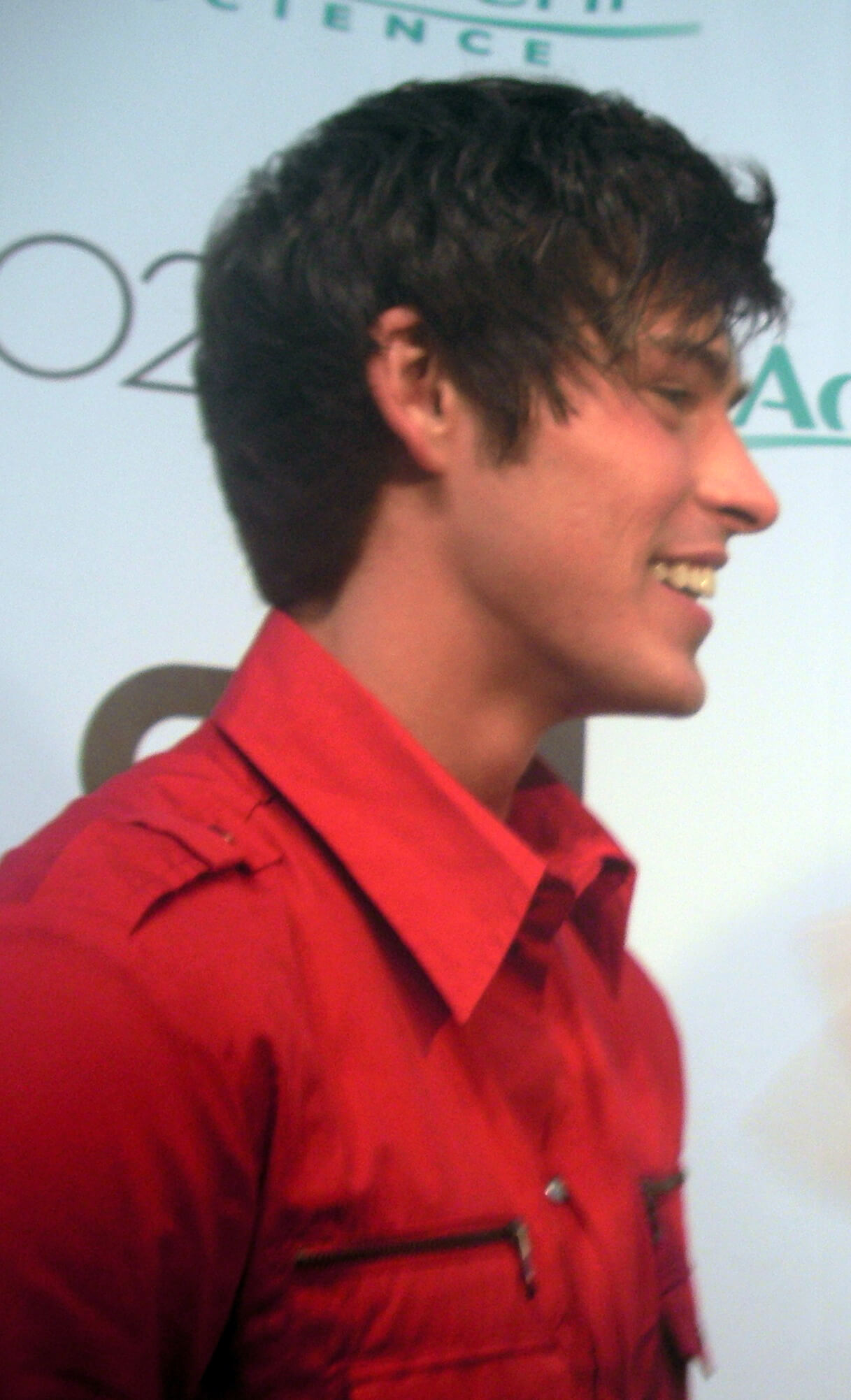
Adam Gregory portrays Ty Collins.

Ty Collins, portrayed by Adam Gregory during season one, is introduced as a rich and popular student at West Beverly Hills High School. He exudes a cool self-confidence, and occasional cockiness, while displaying a generally suave and friendly demeanor. Ty has a fondness for acting, and often performs in school plays. Ty met Annie Wilson shortly after she became a new student at West Beverly, and the two soon began dating. Later, Annie became the understudy for a troubled actress named Adrianna, who also had a personal history with Ty. Out of spite, Adrianna tricks Annie into thinking that Ty had been unfaithful, prompting the couple's break-up. When Adrianna was eventually compelled to reveal the truth, Annie apologizes to Ty for assuming the worst of him. He accepts, and was open to still being friends. Ty and Adrianna later win lead roles in the new school play. Shortly beforehand, Adrianna discovers that she is pregnant, and that Ty was the father. She soon revealed this to Ty, who, upon recovering from the shock, offered her support and companionship. However, their relationship becomes rocky when his parents grow too controlling for Adrianna's taste. It is revealed that the Collins family wanted to send Adrianna out of the country to give birth, with plans to then put the baby up for adoption. She additionally comes to resent Ty's willingness to go along with this for the sake of his reputation. These matters prompt a greater amount of distance between the two, though they remain on civil terms. At the West Beverly Prom, Adrianna's water breaks. After being checked into the hospital, she gives birth to a daughter. Ty then signs a form consenting to an adoption, and forged a truce with Navid Shirazi, Adrianna's boyfriend, commending him for his commitment.

=== Jackie Taylor ===
Jackie Taylor is portrayed by Ann Gillespie during the first and second season. She was the mother of Kelly Taylor and Erin Silver. She was separated from Erin Silver and had relapsed into drinking again. Early on in the first season, Kelly Taylor comes and takes Silver into her care instead. In the second season, she makes a return. She had become sober, revealing to her daughters that she was suffering from breast cancer. After receiving the news, Silver decided to move back in with her to look after her in her final three months she had to live. Kelly however refused to 'fall back into her traps' and would not see her again. In episode nine, Jackie throws a half-birthday party for Silver, and although Jackie says she doesn't expect it to make up for her mistakes, Silver says it does. At the end of the episode, Jackie suffers from a heart attack, and is taken to hospital. Although Silver visits her, knowing she was due to die at any time, Kelly will not, but drives Silver to the hospital. However, when she goes to the hospital to pick Silver up she finds the room Jackie was in is empty and realizes she has made a mistake which she will regret. It turns out that Jackie was actually just moved and Jackie makes her apology and Kelly forgives her, before Jackie passes away towards the end of episode ten.

=== Constance Tate-Duncan ===
Constance Tate-Duncan, played by Maeve Quinlan in seasons one to three, is Adrianna's overbearing mother and a former actress, whose constant pressure has driven her daughter to drugs. She also has serious financial problems and depends on Adrianna to bring in money from acting gigs.

=== Omar Shirazi ===
Played by Shaun Duke in seasons one to three, Omar Shirazi is Navid's father and a pornographic movie producer. In season three he is exposed to have knowingly hired underage actors to star in his films.

=== Atoosa Shirazi ===
Atoosa Shirazi, Navid's mother, is played by Fabiana Udenio in seasons one to three. She is seemingly unaware of her husband's illegal activity and is proud of her son in season three when he brings in honest money after his father left for Iran.

=== Dana Bowen ===
Portrayed by April Parker-Jones in one episode in season one and three episodes in season two, Dana Bowen is Dixon's birth mother. Annie met her in season one when Dixon was too nervous to get out of the car. In season one episode 18, Dixon reveals that his birth mom has bipolar when he sees the same symptoms with his then girlfriend Silver. Later on, in episode 19, Dixon and Annie road trip to see Dana. Dixon felt bad because he said he wanted to leave her when he was a child and had extreme guilt because of it and felt like it was his fault; but when Annie was talking to her, Dana reveals it was not Dixon's decision and it was for the best.

In season two she returns and begins to reconnect with Dixon.

=== Mark Driscoll ===
Mark Driscoll, played by Blake Hood in season two, is an evil-senior-jock and bully at West Beverly High. He meets Annie at the Beach Club gets her drunk and invites her to a cabaña (that Navid had decorated to have sex with Adrianna). After Navid's plan failed, both Mark and Annie take over and start making out. Mark manages to take a naked photo of Annie with his cellphone, so he could show his friends that he hooked up with "the Principal's little girl." After the sext debacle, a visibly ashamed Mark tries to make amends with Annie, but she keeps brushing him off. He then tells her that Jasper is a drug dealer, but his credibility is lost when he tries to date-rape Annie and Jasper saves her. Mark disappears for a while, and weeks later comes back to play poker at the school's clandestine gambling club and ends up winning, causing Dixon to owe him enormous amounts of money. Mark then tells Dixon that instead, he will forgive about the money if he gives him the school's key. A naive Dixon opens the school at night to find out that Mark and his friends wanted to steal the SAT tests. After discovering such tests were not there, they vandalize the school making Dixon solely responsible. Dixon tells Mark about how his father (the Principal) covered up for him and is not pressing charges. Mark then tells Dixon that the Principal's lack of ethics will come in handy someday. In the Season 2 Finale, Harry Wilson tells Mark that he has to take a test again or he will fail for the year. Mark brings up the fact he covered for Dixon, which makes Harry confess his mistake and ends up getting fired.

=== Gia Mannetti ===
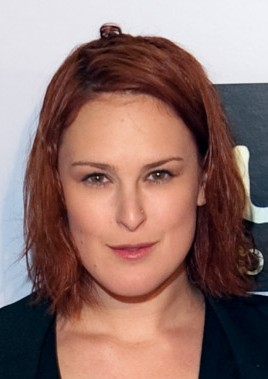
Rumer Willis portrays Adrianna's lesbian love interest Gia Mannetti.

Gia Mannetti, portrayed by Rumer Willis during season two, is Adrianna's love interest who works on the Blaze but then ends up just making Adrianna love Navid more. She is in a relationship with a girl named Alexa but they break up. Gia feels embarrassed when her ex-girlfriend showed up with another girl, so Adrianna kissed her to make her feel better. However, Gia begins developing feelings for Adrianna. She announces that she has feelings for her in a bathroom, making Adrianna uncomfortable. Adrianna then realizes that she, too, has feelings for Gia and began a relationship. Adrianna was embarrassed to be seen with Gia in a romantic way, until she kisses her on stage after a 'Glorious Steinems' performance. The romance is short lived, though, when after a fight, Adrianna walks in on Gia and Alexa after having just slept together. Adrianna then gets back together with Navid.

=== Colleen Sarkossian ===
Liam's mother Colleen is portrayed by Sarah Danielle Madison during the second and fourth season. Although her husband has cheated on her, she stays with him and lets him kick Liam out of the house. She later appears on Thanksgiving, to reconcile with Liam, who is surprised to see her. After she promises to stay in Liam's life as she has now 'separated' from Liam's stepfather, she joins Liam for Thanksgiving dinner, only to reveal later that she is still with Liam's step-dad and she was only using Liam, who is now a rich model, for financial assistance. Angry and frustrated, he asks his mom to leave his Thanksgiving dinner.

=== Sasha ===
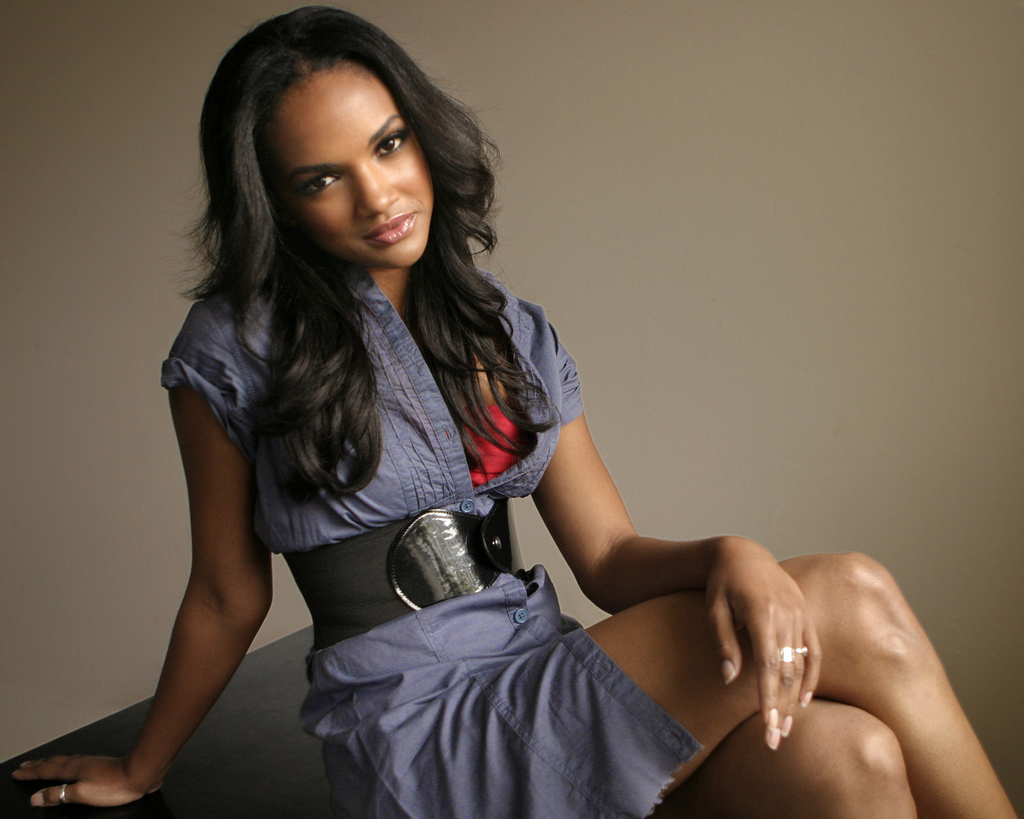
Mekia Cox portrays Dixon's older love interest Sasha.

Sasha is played by Mekia Cox during season two and one episode in season three. She is a professional DJ who meets Dixon at a pizza restaurant. The two hit it off until he finds out she is 25 years old, and keeps lying to her until she finds out the truth and breaks up with him. He tries to win her back and succeeds, to then discover their relationship will never work because of the age difference. Sasha, scared that Dixon will leave her, fakes a pregnancy, which is uncovered by Debbie Wilson. She is possibly set to reprise her role at the start of season three. She returned in the Season 3 episode "The Bachelors" making desperate attempts to talk to Dixon including by unsuccessfully attempting to outbid Ivy at the Bachelor auction. She finally gets to talk to him and tells him that she is HIV positive.

=== Jasper Herman ===
Jasper Herman, portrayed by Zachary Ray Sherman during the second season, is a West Beverly student, who is the nephew of the man that Annie hit with her car. He is also a drug dealer and the one from whom Adrianna gets her drugs in season two. Annie, feeling guilty for having killed his uncle, becomes friends with Jasper. Both being outsiders, he and Annie become closer and eventually start a relationship. Annie also loses her virginity to him. Due to Navid's allegations that he is a drug dealer, Annie's parents forbid her from seeing him, though she doesn't obey. It is eventually revealed that he knew Annie hit his uncle with her car all along. Later on in season two, he is seen pressuring Annie into staying with him and claims that they are 'soulmates'. Annie, however, does not wish for the relationship to continue, but is continually blackmailed by Jasper, who has photographic evidence of her hit and run incident. He then tries to commit suicide because he couldn't live without Annie. He survives, and promises to keep Annie's secret. He later returned in “Javianna” to explain to Annie that he's been an outcast until he met Annie and he didn't expect to fall in love with her, which he did. Annie forgave him and rejected his offer to be friends. He is last seen being punched by Liam in the season two finale when he presumably sets fire to the sailboat Liam had been working on all year.

Jasper makes an appearance in season 5 when Annie sees him at the West Beverly High alumni event (in the 100th episode) and says that he wants to apologize to Liam for what happened between the three of them, two years ago.

=== Laurel Cooper ===
Played by Kelly Lynch in seasons two and three, Laurel Cooper is an outrageously rich music producer who has a whirlwind romance with Mr. Matthews. She has quite a history under her belt, as evidenced by her colorful stories about various rock stars and celebrities. There is, of course, more to Laurel than at first appears. She is also Ivy's mother. She has signed Adrianna for her music career. She is also in an open relationship with her daughter Ivy's childhood friend, Oscar, although he has feelings for Ivy as well.

=== Miles Cannon ===
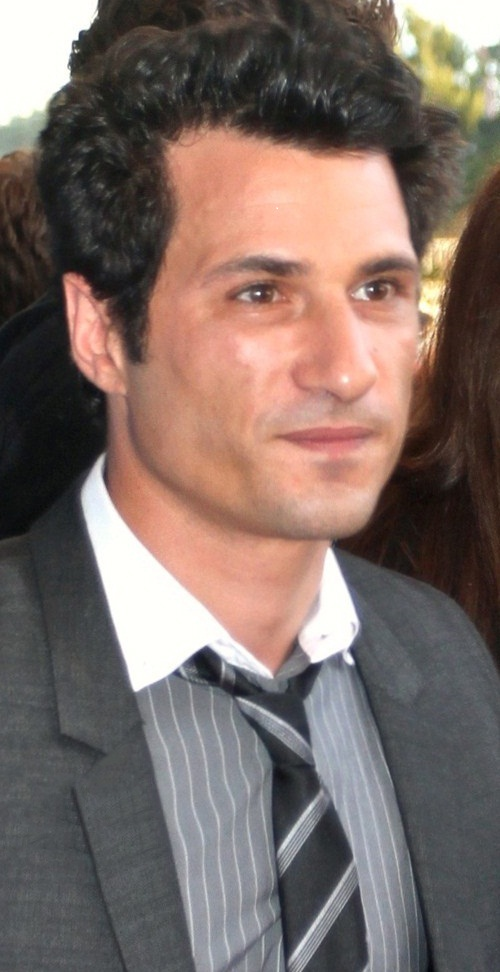
Hal Ozsan portrays Miles Cannon in seasons two and three.

Played by Hal Ozsan during seasons two and three, Douglas Atherton, joined the cast as the new faculty adviser for The Blaze, under the alias of Miles Cannon. Naomi falsely accuses him of sexual harassment after he fires her from the newspaper, but tells the truth eventually. However, in the season finale, he rapes Naomi telling her, "Who's going to believe you? You're the girl who cried wolf." He then hints that the next girl he is going for is Silver. He steals her scarf and constantly looks upon her as more than a pupil. Cannon thinks his stature as a teacher will protect him and that he will easily defeat Naomi's efforts to seek justice, even goading her by saying her trust fund will soon be his, but it is Cannon, however, who engineers his own defeat. Following Naomi's involvement of the police, Cannon is suspended and is walking out to his car with a box containing his personal effects, inside which is a sports drink bottle with a Chelsea F.C. logo on it which falls out. The bottle is intercepted by Oscar, who has an ability to identify an English accent to a certain area of the island. Oscar spots Cannon's accent as being from Dagenham. Cannon is quick to silence Oscar but Oscar insists Cannon is from Dagenham. Later in the day, Oscar meets with Naomi to ask her out for a date a second time, earlier that day, Naomi rebuffed Oscar telling him his accent is a turn-off, Oscar senses Naomi is under stress and offers to help. Together they work to uncover Cannon's history. They go on the internet and try to learn about his life in England, but turn up nothing. Oscar asks what the reason for the search is and Naomi has Oscar punch in the words teacher, sex offender, Dagenham. The search now turns up news stories of a teacher wanted in England for sex crimes. The photo Naomi pulls up shows Cannon but under it is the name Douglas Atherton. Oscar and Naomi now know what they need to and go to the police with the new evidence. The police in conjunction with English authorities confirm with Oscar and Naomi their findings. Later the police arrive at Atherton's home to arrest and serve him with extradition, but inform Naomi that Atherton fled. Oscar says the worst is now over, but Naomi is not so certain fearing Atherton may strike again. He returns several episodes later, hiding in Naomi's hotel room. He then keeps Naomi hostage along with Silver too. He demands them to prove his innocence on a video tape and later demands money. However, just before heading to the Bank, Naomi and Silver hit him and he falls unconscious. Naomi then hold his knife up against his throat, but after Silver discouraging her, she drops the knife and lets the police arrest him.

=== Oscar ===
Oscar, played by Blair Redford during season three, is a handsome, charismatic, and charming British teen, who is an old friend of Ivy. He moves in with her and her mom in the season three premiere. Oscar is described as “one part Talented Mr. Ripley, one part young Johnny Depp, and all parts sexy” and Oscar will be a crucial part next season, making trouble for others. As of 2021 Vision, it appears he has returned to take revenge on Laurel. Oscar slept with Ivy in episode 5. He was then interested in Naomi, and helped expose Miles Cannon's lies.

=== Victor Luna ===
Played by Nestor Serrano in season three, Victor Luna is the uncle of Javier Luna. When Adrianna sings at Javier's funeral, Victor finds out that she stole the song from Javier. Victor blackmails Adrianna in becoming her agent and makes her do several tasks she doesn't want to do. When Adrianna becomes more successful she starts playing the boss over Victor. Eventually Victor is fed up with her and tells the press that Adrianna stole her songs from Javier, which ruins her career.

=== Charlie Selby ===
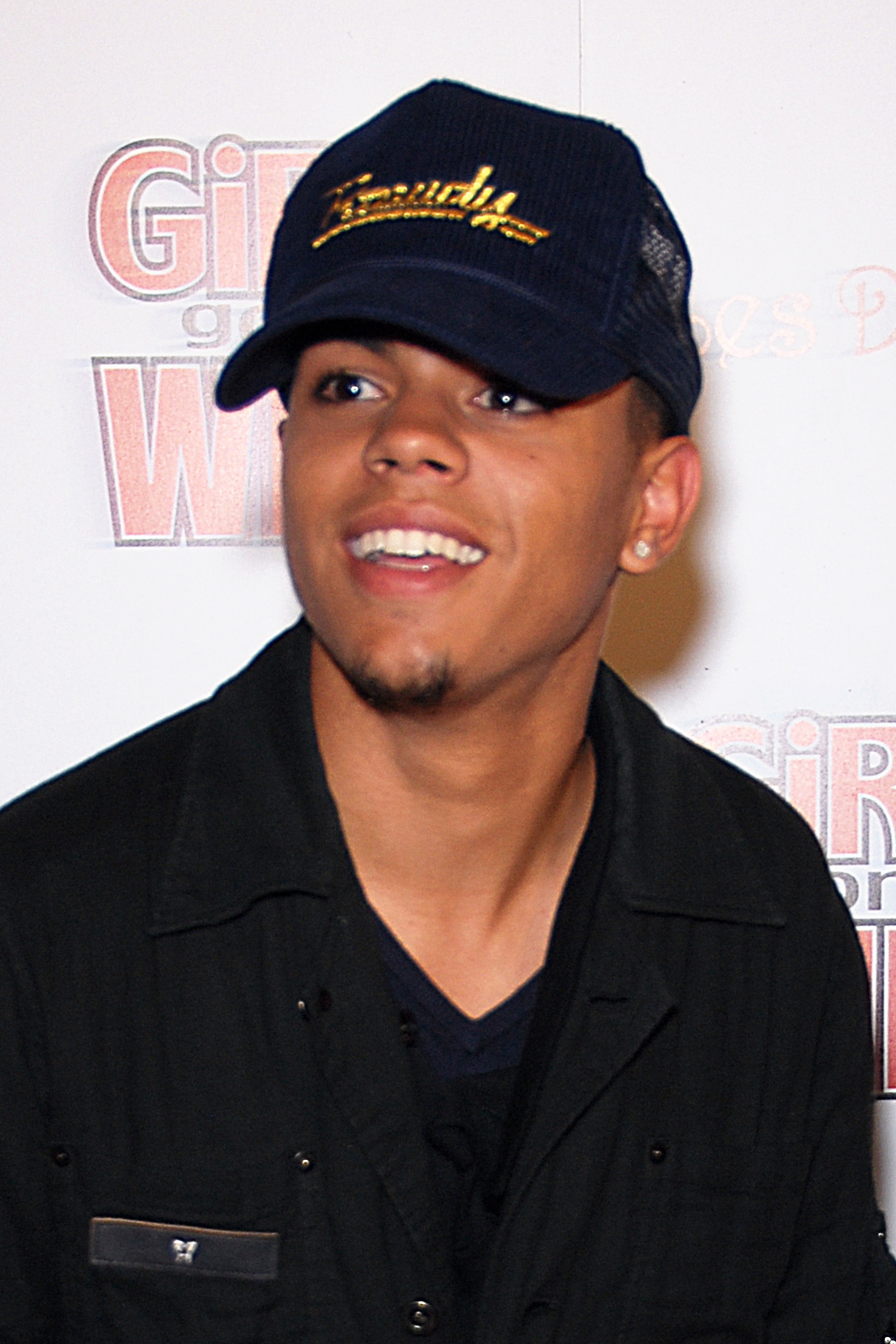
Evan Ross portrays Liam's half-brother and Annie's boyfriend Charlie Selby.

Played by Evan Ross in season three, in his first scenes, Charlie makes an impression on Annie with his literary name-checking and low tolerance for superficiality. In episode 2, "Age of Inheritance," it is revealed he is Liam's half-brother. He and Annie start dating but then, Annie sleeps with his brother, Liam, which causes her confusion. After talking to Liam properly, Charlie tells him that he only let Liam get beat once whereas he got beaten almost every day. He also tells Liam he wanted to protect him, not hurt him. With that said, Liam reconciles with Charlie. However, after he finds out that Annie and Liam slept together during the episode "Holiday Madness," he leaves to Paris for a semester abroad. He lets Liam stay in the house and helps his brother and Annie finally getting together.

=== Ian ===
In season three Kyle Riabko portrayed Ian, a love interest for Teddy Montgomery. It was revealed in episode 3 that he and Teddy hooked up. After running into an anxious Teddy, he assures him that he will not tell anyone about what happened, which only seems to agitate Teddy more. Ian appears later conversing with Silver which causes a concerned Teddy to approach her after Ian leaves and ask what they were talking about. Later on in the day Ian is seen coaching the boys on how to dance for an opening performance at Silver's breast cancer benefit auction, and after giving pointers to all of them tries to get Teddy to loosen up causing Teddy to angrily call him a faggot. Ian runs into Teddy the night of the benefit and Teddy tells Ian to stay away from him. Ian replies that he doesn't want to be around him either simply because Teddy couldn't deal with who he really is, he shouldn't take it out on him. This makes Teddy mad and he attacks Ian as a fight erupts between them. Mr. Matthews breaks up the fight and gives both of them detention after they both refuse to explain why they were fighting. In episode 9, Ian picks up Teddy from a gay bar after Teddy accidentally loses his wallet. It is shown Teddy begins confide and trust Ian. Teddy finds Ian as a role model. Teddy aspires to be like Ian, who is happy, comfortable, and confident with his sexuality. At the beach luau, Teddy sees Ian with another guy and feels jealous. He admits his feelings for Ian, by kissing him and wanting to start a relationship. In episode 11, Teddy wants to continue seeing Ian but Ian doesn't want their relationship to be a secret. Teddy isn't ready yet, and Ian can't accept that at first. But at Adrianna's party, Teddy tells Ian he really wants to be with him, and, one day, he will be ready to come out to the world. Ian finally agrees, they kiss and start their relationship, unaware Dixon saw them kissing. In episode 14, Ian continues to try to convince Teddy to come out to his friends, Teddy feels pressured and still asks Ian to be patient. Teddy is blackmailed about his secret and panics. During a conversation with Silver, he tells Silver where he spent his winter break. Silver tells Teddy it's the same place Ian spent his whole break as well. Teddy panics and leaves, leaving Silver to figure out the pieces. Teddy eventually decides to come out to his friends, thanks to Silver for her boost of confidence. Teddy and Ian walk in the party hand in hand and revealing to his friends that he is gay. Things are rather awkward at first, but go okay in the end. Teddy is happy and feels free coming out. On the ride home, Ian accidentally slips that someone put the blackmailing photos in Teddy's locker which Teddy didn't say he found the blackmail in his locker, revealing Ian was blackmailing him to get Teddy to come out of the closet sooner. Teddy is disappointed and immediately breaks up with Ian, ending their relationship.

=== Max Miller ===
Max Miller, portrayed by Josh Zuckerman as a recurring character in seasons three and four, is Naomi's new lab partner. He appeared in the episode "Revenge with the Nerd," where he helps Naomi to get her money back from Guru Sona. After the help Naomi is attracted to him and kisses him, but he turned her down saying that she is not his type. He starts a relationship with Naomi in the episode "Blue Naomi" when she dresses herself up as an Avatar character to impress him. Sick and tired of keeping their relationship secret, they come out as boyfriend and girlfriend to the whole school. At the end of Season 3, after a cheating scandal, Max's parents force him to break up with Naomi, feeling she is a bad influence on him. Naomi tells Max she is pregnant. In the beginning of season four, Naomi and Max attend a doctor's appointment where Max is initially supportive, stating that this is "where we always wanted to be, just sooner than anticipated". However, when the doctor reveals that Naomi's earlier test was a false positive and that she is not pregnant the couple continues on as planned, going their separate ways.

He later returns early in the fourth season and reveals he chose to go to Caltech instead of MIT. He and Naomi rekindle their romance, though she is continually tempted by newcomer Austin Tallridge. Despite her best efforts Naomi eventually succumbs to Austin's advances and she and Max again part ways. He returns again towards the end of the season revealing that he is engaged to a girl named Madison and that he is now vastly wealthy, having started his own company. Naomi is hired to plan their wedding, but is disheartened to learn that Max is getting married, and realizes she still has lingering feelings for him. She sets out to dissolve his romance with Madison, which all seemingly end in vain, even after Max asks her if he is making the right choice. However, on the day of his wedding, Naomi interrupts the ceremony and declares her undying love, confessing that Max is the love of her life and she knows she is the same for him. She then runs off as the entire ceremony falls silent. Moments later, Max finds Naomi and informs her that she is right. The two are reunited for a third time and are last seen sharing a passionate kiss.

=== Raj Kher ===
Raj Kher, portrayed by Manish Dayal in seasons three and four, is Ivy's husband. They meet in a medicinal marijuana retailer and instantly become friends. Raj tells Ivy that he is using the marijuana, because he is dying of cancer. Their friendship soon blooms into more and they start a relationship. Raj helps Ivy stop her reckless behavior and taking drugs. He also helps Ivy overcome her fear of the ocean. When they go to the West Bev prom, which has a future theme, Raj, upset because he knows Ivy will have a future and he will not, starts acting like a jerk and he and Ivy get into a fight. After making amends the next day, Raj ask Ivy to marry him, which she accepts. In the season finale, Raj and Ivy get married on the beach in an Indian wedding. In season four, he tells her that he's cancer-free and goes off to college when their marriage starts to crumble, but it is later revealed that he lied about being in remission when he's shown at the hospital near death. He and Ivy reconcile right before he dies.

=== Austin Tallridge ===
Austin Tallridge, portrayed by Justin Deeley in season four, is a new love interest for Naomi. He meets Naomi when she is looking for a new house and decides to buy his, but when he refuses to sell it, Naomi calls his parents telling them about the growing pot he has in the backyard and he is forced to sell it to her. Austin moves into a beach house and takes Dixon in as his roommate. When Dixon is having problems to create a demo CD, Austin gives him his ADHD pills to help him get it done. Naomi asks Austin to help her make Holly lose the sorority games at CU. She later kisses Austin, but then finds out that Holly and Austin where dating and now Holly is even angrier at her. The day of the games, Holly tricks Naomi's ex, Max, into coming back to Beverly Hills and when Austin sees them kiss, he feels jealous. Austin help Naomi prepare the "Rock the Vote" party and they end up trapped in a van after the security guards think they were trying to get in. In the van Austin reveals his true feelings to Naomi and they almost kiss until Max opens up the van. After the events of the party Austin stays away from Naomi until his cousin Sally comes to visit which makes Naomi jealous, because she thinks he is Austin's date, and decides to participate in a talent show to beat her. After Naomi wins, Max breaks up with her, because he knows she was doing it for Austin. Naomi then finds out that it was Austin's cousin and not his date. Austin later tries to take over Liam's modeling job after he declines, but ends up not getting it. He then shows up at the masquerade party at CU, where Naomi confesses her true feelings for him in front of everyone and they start dating. When it is Austin's birthday, he ditches Naomi, because his father wants him to be in Las Vegas with the family and he doesn't want to take Naomi. She follows him and finds out that he has a bad relationship with his father and he gets mad at her for following him. At Thanksgiving, Austin comes back from Vegas, and Naomi only wants to have sex, but he wants to talk about his problems and start ignoring her need for sex. They later go horse riding in an effort to make things right, but they have yet another fight and Austin leaves Naomi behind without knowing that she is trapped. She then accidentally starts a fire, which Austin sees and they make amends and Austin tells Naomi that his parents are getting a divorce. When Naomi gets her internship with Rachel Gray, she is too busy to have some alone time with Austin and bosses Austin around without thanking him, which causes a fight between them. After Holly finds out that Naomi got the internship with her mother that she wanted, she kisses Austin in front of her in order to get revenge.

=== Amal Shirazi ===
Amal Shirazi, portrayed by Anthony Azizi in season four, is Navid's uncle who sells stolen cars at Shirazi Studios. Navid later starts working undercover in order to get Amal arrested.

=== Vanessa Shaw ===
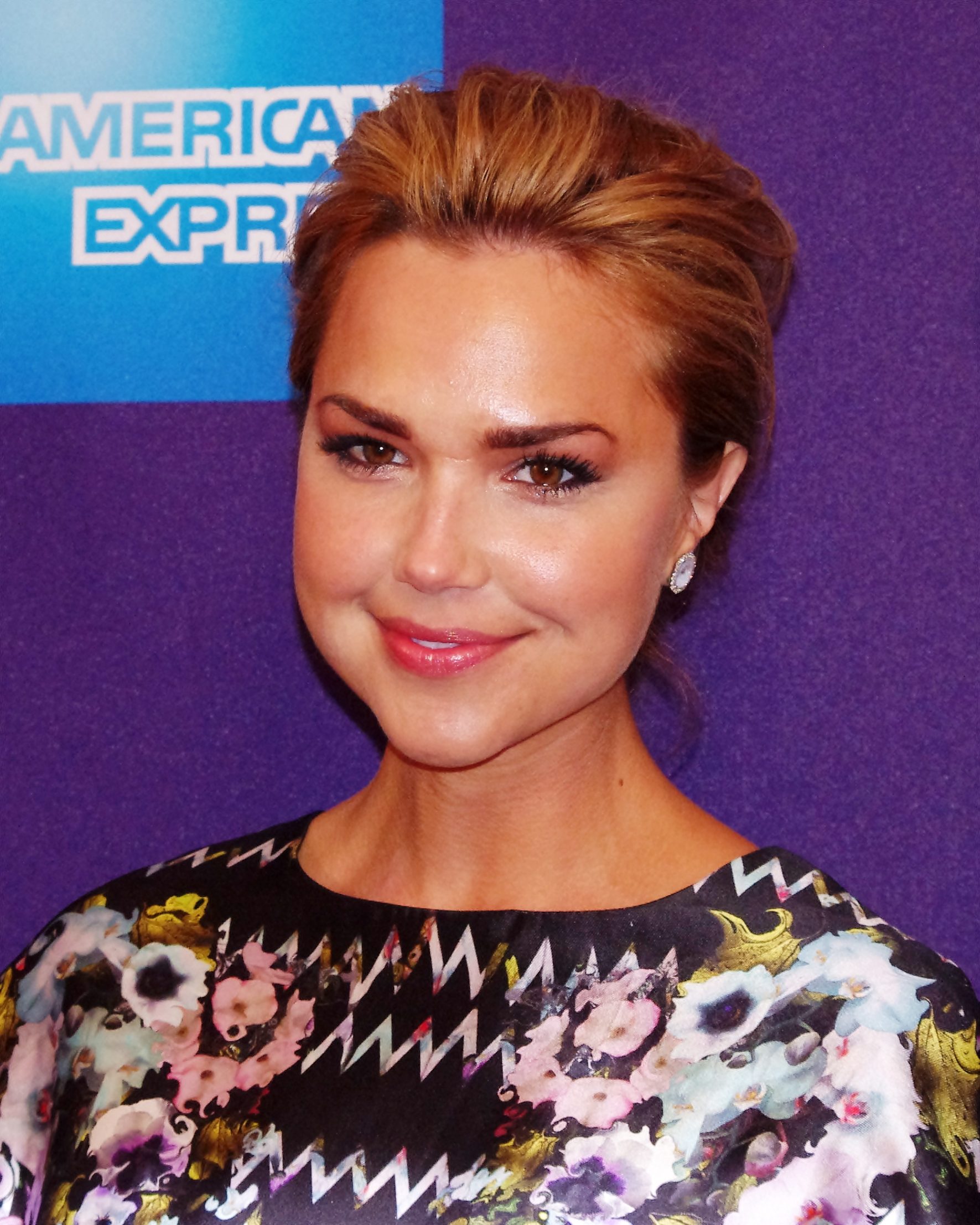
Arielle Kebbel plays the devious and manipulative Vanessa Shaw

Portrayed by Arielle Kebbel from season four to season five.

Vanessa first appears in season 4 as the unnamed driver of a maroon car that knocks Liam off his motorcycle. She recognizes Liam's face as the "hot model billboard guy," and instead reports the accident as a hit and run. In reality, though, she was the one that hit Liam. In "Should Old Acquaintance be Forgot?", Vanessa has brainwashed Liam into thinking she found him the night of the accident and called for help, since the she has been taking care of Liam in the hospital. Annie invites Liam and Vanessa to a party in order to get to know her better. Annie starts publicly attacking Vanessa, questioning her reasons for visiting Liam every day in the hospital and labeling her selfless. She also proposes that Vanessa must have been feeling guilty because she might have had something to do with putting him in hospital. Annie then goes on to reveal that Vanessa said a black car hit Liam, when a mechanic said Liam's bike was hit by a maroon car. Later, Liam asks Vanessa if she told everything she saw to the police. Vanessa says she did, but explains she didn't see much as it was dark and the suddenness of it all makes it hard to remember. Vanessa tells Liam if he wants to be with Annie that's fine, but she isn't going to be a cussed of something she did not do. Later on, Annie tells Liam that she wants him to move on with Vanessa, because she thinks she was inventing reasons for them both not to be a couple due to her being afraid to let him go. Liam decides to give a relationship with Vanessa a try and kisses her, cementing their official relationship publicly. However, whilst at the airport ready to leave for Carnegie Mellon, Annie discovers that Vanessa has a bunch of fake ID's after mistaking Vanessa's bag for hers. Annie now sees it as her personal mission to expose Vanessa and get back Liam. Annie returns Vanessa's bag to its owner and warning her if she doesn't leave Liam alone she will tell him about the fake ID's. Later on, Vanessa leads Liam to a house, where she tells him she hit him with her car, and that she's been in trouble with the law before. Annie then shows up suddenly, and tells Liam about Vanessa criminal record. Vanessa explains that she used to live in the broken down house and that she used to be bounced around different families. She understands if this is all a deal breaker, but Liam brushes by all of it and labels Annie a nut-job, warning her that it's not her responsibility. At Liam's bars re-launch, Vanessa apologizes to Liam for the day they first met and he responds by telling her he trusts her.

Vanessa drives out Liam's manager, Shelia, and takes over the role without having any experience what so ever. She lands him a job working as a celeb guest at Annie's benefit. At the benefit, Liam tells Vanessa that he can't change into something he's not and that maybe he's just not star material. While Annie is talking with Liam, he notices a woman drowning in a bay nearby. Liam then dives in and saves the woman, to a lot of fanfare. Liam gets interviewed by the news about the incident and Vanessa tells him the rescue got him noticed by a couple of casting directors. After Liam leaves, Vanessa pays the woman who was “drowning”. Vanessa continues to work her manager magic and books Liam a bunch of no-name auditions. She also gets him an audition for a supporting role in a movie, and Liam performs the monologue for the audition. Vanessa calls someone pretending to be Adrianna and finds out where Ade's meeting with Lee Brodsky, a big movie producer, is. Vanessa goes to the restaurant where Lee was supposed to meet Ade and Dixon and invites him over to her table. Later, Liam tells Ade that he got a movie role and didn't have to audition because Vanessa ran into the producer and got him the job. Adrianna is obviously certain of Vanessa's role in her missing her meeting. Vanessa finds Ade going through her purse/phone and Ade tells her she knows Vanessa sabotaged her meeting. Vanessa tries to talk her way out of the situation and says she won't tell Liam about this, but won't be so understanding next time. Meanwhile, Ade shows Liam the picture of the woman he saved and tells him about Vanessa. Liam confronts Vanessa about the issue at the festival and she tells him Ade is crazy and has it out for her. Vanessa goes into Ade's trailer and says she warned her. Vanessa then breaks a glass, smashes her head into a mirror, and screams for help. Liam and Dixon show up, and Vanessa tells them that Ade went crazy and attacked her. Ade tries to tell them that Vanessa did it to herself, but Vanessa brings up the purse incident which doesn't help Ade's case at all. Ade has to go to security for questioning afterwards, which causes her to miss performing with Dixon.

Silver asks Liam to go with her to her appointment tomorrow and thanks him for keeping her doctor visits between them. Vanessa then comes by and gives Liam a $50,000 check, telling him the two should go take a drive up the coast tomorrow. Liam lies to Vanessa and says he has to take publicity photos tomorrow. Over at the doctors', Liam gets a text from Vanessa about the photo shoot. Vanessa later confronts Silver about the photo shoot and then asks her and Liam where they really were yesterday. Silver tells Vanessa about Liam taking her to doctors’ appointments. Later, Liam gives Vanessa papers for their new production company. Vanessa is determined to make Liam a serious actor who can do indies. She even snags Liam a "crazy big part" in a movie despite Liam being rejected initially. When confronted, Vanessa admits that she blackmailed the movie exec “for Liam and their future.” Liam realizes that Vanessa is "one giant liar and manipulator" and tells her to leave. Liam immediately realizes that Vanessa stole all the money in the cash register and took their production company money. In the fourth-season finale, Vanessa comes back to tell Liam that his movie got selected for a sequel and it starts shooting in Bolivia in three days. She also tells him she's attached as his manager/producer and hopes this can be her second chance.

In season 5, Vanessa becomes more devious, greedy, possessive and controlling of Liam, demanding a bigger cut of his movie pay as well as leasing an expensive beachfront house and passing herself off as his fiancée. When Liam argues with Vanessa about her controlling his life, she falls off the house's beachfront balcony to the ground and then disappears. Liam, thinking that he might have killed Vanessa by accident, tries to cover up her disappearance. When Liam is visited by an FBI agent asking about Vanessa's whereabouts, he confides in Annie about what happened and thinks about turning himself in, but the agent tells Liam that after the FBI made a background check on Vanessa, they found that she has a long criminal records for fraud, embezzlement, among many things. Vanessa is soon revealed to be alive and she tries to blackmail Liam for her own "murder". When Annie finds out that Vanessa is alive, they join forces to search for Liam when he is abducted by a deranged stalker, named Ashley. When Annie and Vanessa find Liam held captive, Ashley tries to stop them, but Annie gets shot before Ashley is arrested. It is also implied that Vanessa turns herself into the authorities as well to answer for her crimes.

== Guest stars ==
Portrayed by Kellan Lutz during season one, George Evans is a West Beverly High resident and a lacrosse teammate of Ethan Ward, who becomes a rival to Dixon Wilson.

Kimberly MacIntyre, portrayed by Jessica Lucas in season one, is an undercover police officer who pretends to be a student at West Bev. She has a short romantic relationship with Ryan, but leaves again when she finds the drug dealer she was looking for.

John Schneider portrays Liam's plastic surgeon stepfather Jeffrey Sarkossian during the second season. He has a very bad relationship with Liam and also cheats on Liam's mother Colleen. After Liam steals an ancient coin from him, he kicks Liam out.

Amber Wallace portrays Lila in season two, Navid's new love interest and a member of "The Glorious Steinems", a band Adrianna joins.

Diego Boneta portrays Javier Luna, a famous singer, during the end of season two and the first episode of season three. Javier becomes a small love interest for Adrianna, but she chooses Navid in the end. When Adrianna returns from touring with him, they get involved in a car crash, which kills Javier. In the season three finale, Adrianna sees the ghost of Javier, who tells her she is a bad person and should just kill herself, but after seeing her friends, she doesn't.

Liza Waltz portrays Katherine Upton in season three. She hires Annie as an intern. She also asks Annie if she can donate her eggs, but Annie eventually declines.

Emily Bradford, played by Abbie Cobb in season three, is Annie and Dixon's cousin from Kansas. Emily comes to town intent on stealing everything from Annie, including her acting parts and her boyfriend Liam, but soon leaves after Liam and Annie trick her into exposing her true self.

Marco Salazar, portrayed by Freddie Smith in season three, is Teddy Montgomery's new love interest. They meet when Teddy accidentally hits Marco with a tennis ball and soon after begin a relationship, but break up during the summer.

Summer Bishil portrays Leila Shirazi in season four, Navid's little sister who comes to live with Navid and Silver and causes several problems.

Jeremy, portrayed by Matt Cohen in season four, is a family member of Marla Templeton and fights with Annie over her inheritance. At first it seems he's winning, but when Annie breaks in his home and tapes him saying bad things about Marla, she wins.

Megalyn Echikunwoke portrays Holly Strickler in season four, a student at CU and a rival of Naomi's.

Jane, portrayed by Kristina Apgar in season four, is a widow who becomes a love interest for Liam, but when it is found out that her husband is actually still alive, she returns to him.

Bree, portrayed by Cameron Goodman in season four, Bree is a CU student and escort that helps Annie get a job as an escort too.

Sarah Hagan portrays Alana in season four, a nerdy girl who joins Naomi's sorority.

Shane, portrayed by Ryan Rottman in season four, is a new love interest for Teddy who is fighting for marriage equality. He later leaves with Teddy to Washington in order to make a difference.

Brandy Norwood portrays Marissa Harris-Young in season four, a young politician in the race to be elected to congress, who hires Silver to make campaign ads.

Patrick Westhill, portrayed by Chris L. McKenna in season four, is a rich business man who hires Annie as an escort and later starts a relationship with her. Annie finds out that he is still hiring escorts, but stays with him in order to get money for Dixon's rehab. She breaks up with him after she is able to get Marla Templeton's inheritance.

Tiffany Hines portrays Kat in season four, a police officer who helps Navid to arrest his uncle Amal. Kat later starts having feelings for Navid, but he is still in love with Silver.

Kim Kardashian plays in season 2 when Naomi's trust fund is locked up by Jen. Khloe kardashian also makes a guest appearances along with Kim kardashian in the episode where they deliver a couple of outfits to Naomi only to find out Naomi is broke and can't afford the outfits for at least another week and the girls get into a confrontation.

The Real Housewives of Beverly Hills star Brandi Glanville made a guest appearance in 2013.
