= 90210 season 1 =

90210
- Season 1
- DVD cover
- Starring: Rob Estes; Shenae Grimes; Tristan Wilds; AnnaLynne McCord; Dustin Milligan; Ryan Eggold; Jessica Stroup; Michael Steger; Lori Loughlin; Jessica Walter; Jessica Lowndes
- No. of episodes: 24

Release
- Original network: The CW
- Original release: September 2, 2008 – May 19, 2009

Season chronology
- Next → Season 2

The first season of 90210, an American television series, began on September 2, 2008. Gabe Sachs and Jeff Judah are executive producers for the first season, after original producer Rob Thomas dropped out to focus on other projects. The series premiered to 4.65 million viewers, and broke records for The CW at the time, becoming their highest rated premiere in viewers and in Adults 18–49 with a 2.6 rating. On September 22, 2008, after airing just four episodes, the network gave the series a full-season order of 24 episodes.

Season one regular cast members include Rob Estes, Shenae Grimes, Tristan Wilds, Jessica Stroup, Dustin Milligan, Ryan Eggold, AnnaLynne McCord, Michael Steger, Lori Loughlin, and Jessica Walter. Along with special guests from the original series, Jennie Garth, Shannen Doherty, and Tori Spelling. In the thirteenth episode, Walter left the series and Jessica Lowndes was promoted to a series regular due to "financial reasons". The CW also hired Rebecca Sinclair to re-tool the series as head writer. She took over completely as executive producer by the end of the season, after Sachs and Judah resigned.

The season finale aired on May 19, 2009, and was seen by 2.00 million viewers. The season averaged 2.24 million viewers and a 0.9 rating in the Adults 18–49 demographic.

== Cast and characters ==
=== Main ===
- Rob Estes as Harry Wilson
- Shenae Grimes as Annie Wilson
- Tristan Wilds as Dixon Wilson
- AnnaLynne McCord as Naomi Clark
- Dustin Milligan as Ethan Ward
- Ryan Eggold as Ryan Matthews
- Jessica Stroup as Erin Silver
- Michael Steger as Navid Shirazi
- Lori Loughlin as Debbie Wilson
- Jessica Walter as Tabitha Wilson
- Jessica Lowndes as Adrianna Tate-Duncan^{1}

=== Recurring ===
- Christina Moore as Tracy Clark
- Adam Gregory as Ty Collins
- James Patrick Stuart as Charles Clark
- Matt Lanter as Liam Court
- Kellan Lutz as George Evans
- Michael Graziadei as Eric
- Patrick James as Jared
- Brandon Michael Vayda as Mike
- Jana Kramer as Portia Ranson
- Sara Foster as Jennifer "Jen" Clark
- Aimee Teegarden as Rhonda Kimble
- Josh Henderson as Sean Cavanaugh
- Lily Collins as Phoebe Abrams

=== Special guest stars ===
- Jennie Garth as Kelly Taylor
- Shannen Doherty as Brenda Walsh
- Tori Spelling as Donna Martin
- Ann Gillespie as Jackie Taylor
- Diablo Cody as herself

- ^Note 1: Jessica Walter is credited as a series regular up until episode 13. From episode 14 onwards she is no longer credited.
- ^Note 2: Jessica Lowndes is credited as a guest star from episodes 1 through to 13. From episode 14 onwards she is credited as a series regular.

== Episodes ==
No. overall	No. in season	Title	Directed by	Written by	Original release date	U.S. viewers (millions)
1	1	"We're Not in Kansas Anymore"	Mark Piznarski	Rob Thomas & Gabe Sachs & Jeff Judah	September 2, 2008	4.65
Harry Wilson, new principal of West Beverly High, returns from Wichita, Kansas to his childhood home of Beverly Hills with his wife Debbie, their daughter Annie and adopted Black son Dixon, to care for Harry's mother, former television star Tabitha Wilson. On their first day at West Beverly, Annie and Dixon encounter Ethan Ward, the star lacrosse player Annie developed a crush on when she met him a few summers ago who is cheating on his girlfriend, Naomi Clark, the spoiled rich girl whose sole focus is her Sweet Sixteen party. Dixon befriends Navid Shirazi, editor of Blaze News and tries out for the lacrosse team to form a bond with his Dad but things go awry when he gets into a fight with George, a team player, compromising his chances of getting on the team. An upset Dixon, who gets thrown out of the team because of Ethan and George (Kellan Lutz)'s conspiring gets back at them by sending a message to Naomi informing her about Ethan's affair only to find out that Ethan has got him back on the team. Erin Silver, the free-spirited rebel gossips about Annie on her blog and humiliates her for befriending Naomi- her ex-best friend but makes it up to her by getting Annie the part in the school musical which upsets Adrianna Tate-Duncan (Jessica Lowndes), a theatre goddess, as well as an out of control drug-addict who steals Naomi's purse to get money for buying drugs which contains the "message" while Annie, Dixon, Navid and Silver crash Naomi's party to prevent this but Naomi eventually finds out. When Naomi fails to complete an assignment, English teacher, Ryan Matthews and guidance counselor as well as Silver's sister, Kelly Taylor (special guest star Jennie Garth), bring the problem to Harry, who quickly realizes that keeping secrets about his past with Naomi's mother, Tracy Clark (Christina Moore) would be difficult when he finds out that he has a son out there somewhere.
2	2	"The Jet Set"	Wendey Stanzler	Gabe Sachs & Jeff Judah & Darlene Hunt	September 2, 2008	4.65
When the West Beverly High hallways are flooded with trash by the opponent schoolteam, Dixon tries to impress his peers and prove them he is not the "Principal's kid" by destroying the other school's cafeteria with 3 wild boars which belongs to Navid's dad, a pornographic movie producer. However, Harry finds out and punishes Dixon, Ethan and Navid. Sparks fly between Annie and Ty (Adam Gregory), one of the leading actors in the musical as well as one of the richest people in school and Ty impresses Annie by flying her to San Francisco for dinner in his private jet, but she is grounded when Debbie finds out that she did not inform her about it. Meanwhile, Silver who is still upset with Naomi for gossiping about her father's affair gets back at her by blogging about Ethan's affair causing Naomi to lose her cool and slap Ethan for humiliating her. She decides to get back at him by making out with George. Adrianna bails at a movie audition due to increased pressure from her mom. Ryan asks Kelly out but finds out she has a four-year-old, Sammy, but she still intends to go out with him when Brenda Walsh (special guest star Shannen Doherty), her old time friend helps her by babysitting. Harry and Debbie discuss about Harry's illegitimate son and Tabitha has a minor car accident.
3	3	"Lucky Strike"	Mark Piznarski	Jill Gordon	September 9, 2008	3.23
Annie and Dixon's Friday night plans come to a screeching halt when they learn that Harry and Debbie have planned a family bowling night at a place called Lucky Strike. This forces both of them to invite some people over secretly- Annie invites Ty so that she can sneak out early to go to a rock concert, Dixon invites Navid, Ethan and some other friends so that they can watch an unreleased James Bond movie at Navid's house. Also Dixon invites Silver, and she feels emotionally pleased spending time with a normal family. Ty then leaves early after he spots Annie having a good time hanging out with Ethan. Harry must confront his past when Tracy, Naomi's mom, confronts him about their illegitimate child he fathered in high school. Naomi finds out her father, Charles Clark is having an affair with a woman named Gail and is even more shocked when she discovers her mother has known about the affair for 2 years, so she goes to Ethan for comfort. Dixon discovers Silver asleep in her car and she confides in him about how she's been staying at a women's shelter because of her mother's drinking problems. The news gets back to Kelly and she confronts their mother Jackie about the repercussions of her alcoholic behavior which results in Silver being thrown out of the house and she decides to live with Kelly.
4	4	"The Bubble"	Sarah Pia Anderson	Dailyn Rodriguez	September 16, 2008	3.28
Tabitha and Brenda co-direct the school musical making Tabitha realise that she is being too harsh on Annie causing her to be distracted during performances and Brenda confronts Kelly about Kelly's continued feelings for Dylan, Sammy's father, and her involvement with Ryan; Dixon gets a job at a cafe called the Peach Pit to ease his worries about the family's financial situation due to problems in selling the Kansas house. Naomi asks for Ethan's help and confronts her father's mistress, Gail, and she is shocked when she learns Gail will be moving into the family beach house. Annie rejects Ty's offer to go on a date with Ethan, only to be disappointed when Ethan doesn't show up and gets back together with Naomi forcing Annie to break out of the Ethan-Naomi "bubble" and rekindle her love with Ty. Silver decides to forgive Naomi for gossiping about her problems with her parents.
5	5	"Wide Awake and Dreaming"	Paul Lazarus	Sean Reycraft	September 23, 2008	2.94
As opening night of Spring Awakening nears, Silver is overwhelmed with stage managing so Dixon offers to help backstage, prompting the two to get close and get together as a couple. Naomi clings on to Ethan and refuses to accept her parents' divorce and is determined to get them back on track with disastrous results. Harry walks in on Annie and Ty making out and is forced to come to terms with the fact his daughter is growing up and decides to have a "sex talk" with her. Brenda, Kelly, and Ryan confront Adrianna about an obvious drug abuse problem, which leads to Adrianna getting kicked out of the play and Annie is given her role. Meanwhile, Annie plans on having sex with Ty at the Roosevelt Hotel after the show but Adrianna tricks her by pretending to have slept with Ty to get revenge on her for taking her part in the play.
6	6	"Model Behavior"	J. Miller Tobin	Jason Ning	September 30, 2008	3.24
Debbie is given an opportunity to shoot a major fashion show by her boss, Antonio. Annie spends time with Adrianna when they both research Debbie's job for Mr. Matthews project which results in Annie landing her an audition which prompts Adrianna to tell her the truth about Ty, but the damage is done as Annie and Ty had broken up. Naomi tries to sabotage her dad's relationship with Gail and decides that the fashion show is the perfect place to bring her parents back together, but her plan backfires. One of Antonio's clients tries to harass Silver and shouts racial slurs toward Dixon, who was defending her which results in a fistfight causing Debbie to lose her job. After receiving a mysterious phone call which makes Ryan suspicious, Kelly takes a leave of absence to go visit her ex-husband, Dylan McKay but is unaware that Brenda has been secretly in touch with him. Naomi and Ethan break up for good while Navid spends time with some girls and Adrianna contacts her drug dealer again due to increased pressure from her mother, Constance to be the breadwinner of the house.
7	7	"Hollywood Forever"	Norman Buckley	Caprice Crane	October 7, 2008	3.11
During a school drug bust Naomi tries to help Adrianna by taking her drugs and tries to dispose them but she is caught. Adrianna plans to come forward to protect Naomi from expulsion, but ends up over dosing when she realises she has to choose between her mother and her friend. Annie and Ethan grow closer through a class assignment about parenthood. Silver throws a party at the Hollywood Forever Cemetery celebrating her half-birthday and gets upset when she realises that she and Dixon do not have common interests. Harry and Debbie are shocked when Tracy informs them that she hired a private investigator to find her and Harry's illegitimate son. New "student" Kimberly McIntyre "flirts" around with Ryan who tells her to keep her distance but is unaware that she is an undercover cop working with Harry to catch the drug dealers who sell to students at West Beverly High.
8	8	"There's No Place Like Homecoming"	Tony Wharmby	Darlene Hunt	October 28, 2008	3.15
Adrianna admits to owning the drugs, thus clearing Naomi's name but Naomi still has detention for the semester where she meets Ozzie, a guy who is interested in her. Adrianna also talks to Navid about her situation, causing the two to form a surprising romantic connection; Adrianna learns that Navid has had feelings for her since junior high and has paid for her stint in rehab. Ethan asks Annie to homecoming and Naomi's feelings of jealousy are incited despite meeting Ozzie at the dance and asks Annie to not see Ethan if they want to remain friends but Annie and Ethan share a secret kiss. Ryan discovers the truth about Kimberly and he reveals his feelings for her by kissing her while Kimberly contacts George for drugs so that she can get to the dealer. Tracy kisses Harry which forces Tabitha to advise Debbie to confront Tracy about her intentions toward Harry. Dixon decides to ask Silver to homecoming but changes his mind when she tells him she doesn't like school dances. He decides to stay with her at her house after she gets her wisdom teeth pulled. Silver then finds out that Dixon really wanted to go to homecoming, so she decides to go with him.
9	9	"Secrets and Lies"	Nick Marck	Dailyn Rodriguez	November 4, 2008	2.94
Silver tries to have a girls' night with a few friends, but the event quickly ends up turning into a house party. Harry and Debbie tell Annie and Dixon about their older half-brother which Harry fathered in high school with Tracy Clark who was given up for adoption and that they are trying to get in touch with him which disturbs both the siblings in different ways. Dixon, who does not appear upset by the news, wonders about his real family and talks to Silver about not "fitting" in the family completely. However, the news bothers Annie who sneaks out to the party and she takes out her anger and frustration by getting drunk and decides to keep her relationship with Ethan a secret from Naomi who tries to get closer to Ozzie but she gets furious when she witnesses Annie and Ethan making out at school the next day. Harry understands what his kids are going through and comforts Annie by promising he will no longer keep secrets from her. Adrianna misunderstands Navid's "extra nice charm and help" as a plead for sex which results in a squabble but later on a heart to heart discussion brings them closer. George Evans (played by Kellan Lutz) sees Ryan and Kimberly together outside of school and blackmails Mr. Matthews to bring him back in the lacrosse team, forcing Harry to send him on a paid leave till Kimberly finishes her job.
10	10	"Games People Play"	Wendey Stanzler	Kristin Long	November 11, 2008	2.71
Adrianna visits Navid's family and enjoys herself while Navid reluctantly rejects her advances because he is a virgin which surprisingly doesn't bother Adrianna. Kelly tries to find out whether Ryan had a sexual relationship with a student and talks to Kimberly who gets closer to the dealer and arrests him while the school, unaware of the truth makes fun of Mr. Matthews including Silver who blogs him as "Professor Pervert". Naomi plans a huge mastermind plan to take revenge on Annie by ruining her sixteenth birthday party which involves her ex-boyfriend, Jason from Kansas being flown in which disrupts her secret love life with Ethan and matters get out of control when Naomi comes clean after making out with Jason resulting in a huge fight, ending their friendship. At the end of the party, Harry's illegitimate son, Sean shows up.
11	11	"That Which We Destroy"	Melanie Mayron	Allison Schroeder & Caprice Crane	November 18, 2008	2.92
Annie and Naomi's feud reaches new heights when Annie tries to humiliate Naomi by adopting her personality which troubles Ethan making Annie realise that she has changed in Beverly Hills and vows to remain the normal "Kansas" Annie; Tabitha advises Debbie to play a larger role in Harry's life regarding Sean which prompts her to invite him into the house, disappointing Tracy. Dixon gets jealous when he feels Harry is not paying him any attention and is treating Sean more like a son which results in a father-son talk in which Harry comforts Dixon that he will always be his son irrespective of the genes. Naomi asks Ozzie's help to form a bond with the "Blendeds', a group of senior girls that love activities that include fashion and blended lattes but in return she has to kiss the school mascot, Wildcat. Kelly visits Brenda and finds out she slept with Ryan which results in an unexpected leave. Silver is threatened by Christina, a cheerleader for the lacrosse team, when she shows too much interest in Dixon. Sean reveals that he may have an ulterior motive to visit Beverly Hills.
12	12	"Hello, Goodbye, Amen"	Stuart Gillard	Jennifer Cecil	January 6, 2009	2.80
Annie overhears Sean in a suspicious conversation with someone over the phone and raises uncertainty over who he really is when she discovers he requires $200,000 to pay back his dead adopted father's loan. Debbie seconds Annie's thoughts which results in issues with Harry but in the end, he agrees to ask Sean for a paternity test. Sean, however is revealed to have been a con-artist who had conspired with the P.I and had taken Tracy's money from some of her divorce demands which breaks Naomi's heart creating an even larger gap between Annie and her. Meanwhile, Brenda tries to make amends to Kelly after revealing that she had a tryst with the departed Ryan Matthews but they both come together when they agree to accompany Adrianna to her group therapy session for recovering drug addicts. Later, Brenda tells Kelly she is infertile and is thinking of adopting a kid. Also, Adrianna learns her friend Hank is HIV positive and admits she has had unprotected sex with him. Later at the clinic, Adrianna is told she is HIV negative, though the doctor announces Adrianna is pregnant which troubles her deeply when she feels she can't tell anyone. Christina invites Dixon over at her house where she makes a startling revelation to Dixon that she has no romantic feelings for him because she is a lesbian and she just wanted to introduce him to more black folks in Beverly Hills.
13	13	"Love Me or Leave Me"	Wendey Stanzler	Paul Sciarrotta	January 13, 2009	2.18
Adrianna reveals the secret that she's pregnant to Naomi and Navid; each handles the news differently from how she expected. When Dixon reveals the depths of his feelings to Silver, their relationship takes a surprising turn. Meanwhile, Tabitha surprises Annie and Dixon with an unexpected Christmas gift, and she further announces to both Harry and Debbie that she has decided to return to acting. Elsewhere, Annie and Ethan take an escape from a winter heat wave to Tabitha's house in Palm Springs. Tabitha leaves town to pursue a new acting job. Note: This is Jessica Walter's final appearance in the series. Jessica Lowndes is upgraded to a series regular.
14	14	"By Accident"	Michael Grossman	Michael Sonnenschein	January 20, 2009	2.30
Ryan Matthews returns to his job at West Beverly High, which causes a mixed reaction from all the students who gossip about his sudden departure and return, and his refusal to explain where he was or what happened to him troubles Kelly. Also, the school's drama department holds auditions for "Anthony and Cleopatra", and Annie decides to read for the lead role. She was surprised to find Ty trying out for the play, and more surprised when Ethan auditions for a part. Meanwhile, Silver and Dixon continue to experience bumps in their relationship and Dixon breaks up with Silver. Naomi's mother moves to New York for some R&R, so Naomi has to move in with her dad and his much younger girlfriend at the beach house. When Naomi finds out he is having an affair with his realtor, she gets to move to a hotel. Elsewhere, Adrianna tells Naomi that Hank did not get her pregnant. She reveals that it was Ty (Annie's former love interest). Annie gets upset about not getting the role and decides not to go to the casting party. Though she changes her mind and calls up Ethan to come and pick her up. During their conversation on the phone Annie loses Ethan's voice only hearing sounds of glass shattering, cars honking and crashing. She calls out his name leaving unknown on what happened to Ethan.
15	15	"Help Me, Rhonda"	Liz Friedlander	Jason Ning	February 3, 2009	2.49
Dixon and Navid try to get over Silver and Adrianna so Christina invites Dixon, plus several more students, to a house party where the band Carolina Liar will perform. There, Navid moves on from his relationship with Adrianna by connecting with a fellow Iranian girl named Nika. Naomi and Adrianna try to find a way to break the news about the pregnancy to Adrianna's mother and Ty. Meanwhile, Ethan gets involved in an unexpected mishap when he has a traffic accident and run-in with a shy student from his French class named Rhonda. At the party, Silver gets jealous and questions whether or not Christina is really a lesbian, and reveals that she loves Dixon and they get back together. Adrianna announces to the whole school that she is pregnant.
16	16	"Of Heartbreaks and Hotels"	J. Miller Tobin	Sean Reycraft	February 10, 2009	2.38
Naomi, comfortable with her new living situation, is immediately taken by Liam, a hot bartender at her hotel. Sparks begin to fly between the two but Naomi is confused by the mystery that surrounds Liam. Silver gets extremely upset when her surprise Valentine's Day dinner for Dixon doesn't go as planned, but the two find a way to make the date a moment to remember. Annie becomes increasingly jealous of Ethan and Rhonda's (Aimee Teegarden) close connection and takes advantage of information about Rhonda's past in order to benefit herself, causing Ethan to confront her about her terrible actions. Adrianna doesn't have a date for the dance and decides to spend the night loading up on chocolate, until she hears a surprise knock on her door. Note: This is Matt Lanter's first appearance as Liam Court.
17	17	"Life's a Drag"	Wendey Stanzler	Caprice Crane	March 31, 2009	2.03
In an attempt to get close to Liam, Naomi offers to be his math tutor, but she gets more than she bargains for when he takes her out for a wild night. It turns out that Liam races and when someone tries to talk to Naomi, Liam comes over and punches the guy in the face. Silver takes a class assignment a little too far when she creates a video that documents her love for Dixon. When Silver screens the video for her fellow students, everyone, including Ryan, is shocked when they see Dixon and Silver in an intimate situation. Upon seeing the reaction of everyone around her, Silver blames Ryan for the situation. Ethan and Annie's relationship remains rocky but more problems arise when Adrianna reveals that Rhonda (guest star Aimee Teegarden) and Ethan shared a kiss at the dance. Harry and Debbie are surprised to learn that Annie quit the school play in order to spend more time with Ethan.
18	18	"Off the Rails"	Jason Priestley	Steve Hanna	April 7, 2009	1.95
Ryan attempts to calm Silver down after reactions to her video, but she disappears before he can help. Dixon reveals the situation to Debbie and Harry, who are shocked at the details and confront him about not seeking their help sooner about Silver's behavior. Kelly and Ryan search the streets and show up at Jackie's (guest star Ann Gillespie) home looking for Silver, but the visit proves pointless when harsh words are exchanged. Adrianna is unsure how to care for a child but when she and Navid offer to babysit for Kelly, the two prove to be better at the situation than they thought. Kelly and her friends fear the worst as they continue to search for Silver, not knowing where she is or what is causing her emotional behavior.
19	19	"Okaeri, Donna!"	Stuart Gillard	Jennie Snyder Urman & Rebecca Rand Kirshner Sinclair	April 14, 2009	2.13
Kelly and Silver are surprised when Donna (special guest star Tori Spelling) shows up at their door, straight off a plane from Japan. Annie and Dixon decide to spend their spring break on a road trip to visit someone from Dixon's past, while Ethan decides to step out of his bubble and volunteer with Habitat for Humanity. Naomi joins the Habitat build after learning that Liam is also attending, but is clearly out of her comfort zone. While Kelly and Donna are dining on sushi, Diablo Cody (guest starring as herself) convinces Donna to design a dress for her for a red carpet event.
20	20	"Between a Sign and a Hard Place"	Rob Estes	Jennie Snyder Urman & Rebecca Rand Kirshner Sinclair	April 21, 2009	1.87
After finally selling their Kansas home, Harry and Debbie prepare for a Beverly Hills-style yard sale. Donna tells Kelly details about her separation from David, and the two try to find a suitable location for Donna to open a clothing store in Beverly Hills. Silver and Dixon continue to deal with her recovery, while Liam and Ethan's unlikely friendship continues to develop. Naomi and Annie become friends again but when a scandal involving Naomi's dad surfaces, Naomi loses her trust in Annie. As Adrianna's due date approaches, she and Navid interview prospective adoptive parents.
21	21	"The Dionysian Debacle"	Jamie Babbit	Jennie Snyder Urman	April 28, 2009	1.79
Navid and Adrianna fantasize about their future, but when they tell his parents about their decision to spend the rest of their lives together, things don't go as they planned. Silver and Dixon adjust to her new school, while the Wilsons are dealing with having Naomi as their new house guest. Naomi convinces Annie to go on a double date with Liam's friend, but Annie is shocked at the way the evening ends. When her older sister, Jen (guest star Sara Foster) shows up, Naomi has no idea she is about to shake things up in Beverly Hills.
22	22	"The Party's Over"	Melanie Mayron	Jennifer Cecil	May 5, 2009	1.84
Adrianna and Navid announce plans for their future to their friends but don't receive the reaction they were hoping for. To support their friends, Naomi, Annie and Silver throw Adrianna a bridal shower, while Dixon, Ethan, and Liam surprise Navid with a bachelor party at a burlesque club. Now that Naomi's big sister, Jen, is back in town, the two decide to live together and turn to their scandalous father to release Naomi's trust fund in order to support their wild spending habits. Ryan and Jen bump into each other at the Peach Pit and get wrapped up in a conversation of lies before deciding to have dinner together.
23	23	"Zero Tolerance"	Nick Marck	Gayle Abrams & Jennie Snyder Urman	May 12, 2009	2.07
West Bev's Hollywood-themed sophomore prom is full of surprises, but first Harry warns his students that any non-school sponsored parties after the prom will be met with serious consequences and the school is giving them zero tolerance on that. Naomi learns that Jen has maxed out her credit card to furnish their new home, but soon forgets her problems when Liam asks her to the prom. Meanwhile, Liam continues to count down the moments until Annie shows her true colors, but to prove him wrong, she accepts theater-geek Charlie's invitation to the dance and eventually hurts him just like what Liam wanted Annie to do. Also, Kelly attempts to warn Ryan about Jen's devious and manipulative personality, but unfortunately Ryan dismisses Kelly's warnings which he mistakenly interprets as jealousy. Navid confronts Ty during a fight about abandoning his soon-to-be child with Adrianna, but rushes to Adrianna's side when she goes into labor at the end of the episode. Dixon is surprised to learn he's nominated for Prom King, and Silver is even more surprised when she has the opportunity to speak her mind in front of her peers. Ethan decides to spend time with his dad in Montana and falling for Silver even deeper after Silver gives a well-treated speech that hurts Dixon. Features the song "Houses" by Great Northern during the prom entrance. The Veronicas perform at the prom.
24	24	"One Party Can Ruin Your Whole Summer"	Wendey Stanzler	Rebecca Rand Kirshner Sinclair	May 19, 2009	2.00
Adrianna and Navid spend their prom night in the delivery room and Brenda shows up to offer support. Naomi and Liam have revealed their honest feelings for each other and she decides to host an after-prom party at her new house, much to Jen's disapproval. Showing up late, Naomi searches for Liam but is speechless when she finds him finishing up some business with her sister, Jen, in her bedroom. A furious Naomi confronts and accuses Annie of sleeping with Liam, causing Annie to finally snap at Naomi and all the party-goers before leaving the party in a rage and doing something that will haunt her for the rest of her life. Dixon and Ethan get into a fight when Dixon accuses Ethan of having feelings for Silver. Harry and Debbie chaperone the after-prom party but leave early to lend their support to Adrianna at the hospital, along with Kelly. Silver runs after Ethan, questioning what just happened, and the two kiss, Ethan then says that he does not want to be just friends, he wants to be more or nothing, then posing the question "Why are you out here talking to me? Instead of inside talking to your boyfriend?" Naomi is seen sobbing into the arms of her "comforting sister" only for the camera to spin and show Liam in bed on the phone leaving a message apologizing to Naomi, the message is then interrupted by Liam's stepdad and two of his well built friends hurling Liam out of bed and dragging him out of his room while he shouts for his mom. At the end, Annie is seen driving her car upset and looking at a bottle of alcohol. When suddenly she crashes into someone, a car is then seen driving around the corner and Annie drives off. The car stops at the body and the identity is not revealed. The car also had a WBHS (West Beverly High School) bumper sticker on the back, suggesting its driver goes to school with Annie.

== Production ==
Inter title used for the first season of the series.

On March 13, 2008, it was announced that The CW was developing a contemporary spin-off of Beverly Hills, 90210, which first aired on Fox from October 1990 to May 2000. The project was put on the fast track by the network, and an order of the pilot was expected by the end of the month. The Beverly Hills, 90210 creator, Darren Star, was announced not to be involved with the project, as well as producer Aaron Spelling, who died in 2006. The only surviving element from the original series was the Creative Artists Agency, the talent agency which masterminded the spin-off idea. A detailed breakdown of the pilot written by Thomas was released on March 17, containing information on the plot and characters of the series. None of the characters were related to the original series; however, the series' featured a similar premise: a family with two teenagers who recently moved from the Midwest to Beverly Hills. To reflect the situation at the Beverly Hills school, where around 40 percent of the students were from Persian descent, a student named Navid Shirazi was created. Thomas intended to introduce The Peach Pit, the diner from Beverly Hills, 90210, but noted that it would not be featured in the pilot. The writer considered giving the siblings a job at a movie theater, as he did not want them to use their parent's credit cards. On April 14, Thomas announced that he was leaving the series to focus on his two pilots for ABC. Gabe Sachs and Jeff Judah were hired as the new executive producers and wrote a new version of the script in late April. Sachs said that although Thomas had a "great script", their version of the script was edgier.

On May 11, one day before The CW's upfront presentations, the network officially picked up the series for the 2008–2009 television season. The CW gave the series a full-season order after airing just four episodes. After disagreeing with the network executives over the series' storylines, Sachs and Judah resigned as writers. The CW wanted the series to have a female perspective and focus more on money and glamor; however, Judah and Sachs were more comfortable writing for men. Instead, Judah began working on postproduction, including editing and music supervision, while Sachs ran the production on set. The CW hired Rebecca Rand Sinclair to retool the series as head writer. In late February 2009, Sinclair took over as executive producer.

Filming for the series usually took place in numerous high schools in Torrance and El Segundo, although several scenes were filmed in Torrance High School because of its large auditorium.

=== Cast ===
With the press release for The CW's 2008–09 season, Rob Estes, Shenae Grimes, Tristan Wilds, AnnaLynne McCord, Dustin Milligan, Ryan Eggold, Jessica Stroup, Michael Steger, Lori Loughlin and Jessica Walter were announced as the regulars for the first season.

The producers wanted to see "as many of the original cast members as possible", but were careful not to "parade them all out in the pilot". Following rumors of cast members from Beverly Hills, 90210 appearing on the spin-off, The CW confirmed that Shannen Doherty would be returning in a recurring role as her original character. Sachs met with Doherty over dinner, and told her about the 90210 spin-off. Over the next few weeks, they established Brenda's backstory and Doherty agreed to guest star in several episodes. Doherty and Garth told reporters that they were nervous about reuniting and filming scenes together for the 90210 spin-off. While starring in the original series, the actresses were known for feuding on and off the set, which lead to Doherty leaving the series in 1994. The pair had not spoken for years before filming their first scene together, and commented on the amount of buildup and nerves leading towards their first meeting. Doherty commented, "I think when you're 18, your personalities conflict, then you meet up 10 or 15 years later, and the playing ground is totally different and you're fine."

Other guest stars include Kellan Lutz, Meghan Markle, Maeve Quinlan as Adrianna's mother Constance, Josh Henderson as Sean, a young man who claimed to be Harry's biological son with Tracy Clark, but was really a scam artist, Lauren London as cheerleader Christina, and Aimee Teegarden as Rhonda, a West Beverley student.

Jessica Walter was written out of the series in episode thirteen due to "financial reasons," while Jessica Lowndes was upgraded to series regular in her place.

=== Story ===
Jeff Judah said that they were trying to ground their script in reality, with real character stories and emotional stories. The writers wanted the audience to relate to the characters' problems, which they wanted to be truthful and emotional, but also comedic. The pair were interested in telling several stories simultaneously, featuring many characters. Sachs and Judah found the parents to be an important part of the series, and designed to be contemporary parents. Since the producers were both fathers, they designed the script to include more prominent adult story lines and a strong point of view on parenting. Judah was interested in focusing on how the family kept their moral center when moving to Beverly Hills, and the way the parents dealt with their teenagers.

== Reception ==
The series debuted to 4.7 million viewers and a 2.6 Adults 18–49, winning the night in all key demos, to become The CW's highest rated premiere. It also matched the highest 18–49 numbers set by America's Next Top Model. The season averaged 2.24 million viewers and a 0.9 Adults 18–49 rating in the United States each week. The show also debuted strongly for E4 in the UK, with 468,000 viewers tuning for the pilot episode.

The first season holds a 46/100 rating on Metacritic, indicating generally mixed reviews.

In New Zealand, 90210 debuted on TV3 on October 15, 2008, at 7.30pm then on November 12, 2008, the show was shifted to Four.

== DVD release ==
The DVD release of season one was released after the season completed broadcast on television. It has been released in Regions 1, 2 and 4. As well as every episode from the season, the DVD release features bonus material such as deleted scenes, gag reels and behind-the-scenes featurettes.

90210: The First Season
Set details			Special features
24 episodes; 960 minutes (Region 1); 951 minutes (Region 2); 951 minutes (Region 4); 6-disc set; 2.35:1 aspect ratio; Languages: English (Dolby Digital 2.0 Surround); Subtitles: English, Danish, Dutch, Finnish, Norwegian and Spanish (Region 1); English, Arabic, Dutch, Norwegian, Swedish, English For The Hearing Impaired (Regions 2 and 4)			Audio commentaries: "A Day in the life of Ryan Eggold"; "Fitting In: The Fashion of 90210"; "The Music of 90210"; "Codes of Conduct"; "Set Tours: The Mansion, The Peach Pit, West Beverly High"; "The Revival of a Classic: Making 90210"
Release dates			Audio commentaries: "A Day in the life of Ryan Eggold"; "Fitting In: The Fashion of 90210"; "The Music of 90210"; "Codes of Conduct"; "Set Tours: The Mansion, The Peach Pit, West Beverly High"; "The Revival of a Classic: Making 90210"
United States	United Kingdom	Australia	Audio commentaries: "A Day in the life of Ryan Eggold"; "Fitting In: The Fashion of 90210"; "The Music of 90210"; "Codes of Conduct"; "Set Tours: The Mansion, The Peach Pit, West Beverly High"; "The Revival of a Classic: Making 90210"
August 11, 2009	August 17, 2009	July 4, 2011	Audio commentaries: "A Day in the life of Ryan Eggold"; "Fitting In: The Fashion of 90210"; "The Music of 90210"; "Codes of Conduct"; "Set Tours: The Mansion, The Peach Pit, West Beverly High"; "The Revival of a Classic: Making 90210"
