= Brandon Walsh =

Fictional character in Beverley Hills, 90210

- Beverly Hills, 90210 character
- First appearance: Class of Beverly Hills (1990)
- Last appearance: Ode to Joy (2000)
- Created by: Darren Star
- Portrayed by: Jason Priestley
- Duration: 1990–1998, 2000
- Episode count: 245

In-universe information
- Nicknames: Bran, Brando, B
- Occupation: Co-owner of The Beverly Beat
- Family: Jim Walsh (father); Cindy Walsh (mother); Brenda Walsh (sister) unnamed niece (adopted from China)
- Significant others: Sheryl (ex-girlfriend from Minnesota); Andrea Zuckerman (kissed); Emily Valentine (ex-girlfriend); Brooke Alexander (ex-girlfriend); Nikki Witt (ex-girlfriend); Lucinda Nicholson (ex-girlfriend); Kelly Taylor (ex-fiance); Susan Keats (ex-girlfriend); Tracy Gaylian (ex-girlfriend)
- Relatives: Georgette Walsh (grandmother); Bill (maternal grandfather); Arlene (maternal grandmother)

Brandon Walsh is a fictional character played by Jason Priestley on Fox television series Beverly Hills, 90210. He was the first character introduced in the Beverly Hills, 90210 franchise and served as the lead male character in the television drama.

Brandon was best known for his altruistic nature and strong moral values. Unlike his close friend Dylan McKay, who was portrayed as an anti-hero, Brandon's motives were often unselfish, and he was more of a traditional hero than Dylan. His friendliness made him so popular among his peers that, during the show's run, his sister Brenda, along with his friends, Dylan and Steve, all revealed that they considered Brandon the best friend they ever had.

For his portrayal of Brandon, Priestley was nominated twice for the Golden Globe Award for Best Actor – Television Series Drama, in 1992 and 1994, for the 50th and 52nd ceremonies, respectively. Until his departure in the ninth-season episode, “Brandon Leaves,” his character appeared in every episode but one, and he later returned for a last appearance in the final episode of the series. Starting on season 6, Priestley also became a producer, and for the eighth season was promoted to executive producer, until the ninth season. About his departure, Priestley says he regrets leaving the show too early.

== Beverly Hills, 90210 ==
=== Background ===
Born and raised in Minneapolis, Minnesota with twin sister, Brenda (played by Shannen Doherty), Brandon was the eldest child of Jim and Cindy Walsh. As a result of Jim's job promotion, the family moved to Beverly Hills in 1990, where Brandon and Brenda enrolled at the local West Beverly Hills High School, where in the pilot episode, they met new friends Steve Sanders (Ian Ziering) and Kelly Taylor (Jennie Garth). In episode two, "The Green Room," Brandon befriended loner, Dylan McKay (Luke Perry), before going on to befriend many others in his years spent in Beverly Hills. Brandon was known to have problems with gambling, which affected his relationship with his friends. He also had trouble resisting temptation when dating Kelly, shown with Emily Valentine and, coincidentally, a woman named Emma Bennett.

=== Love life ===
During the show's run, Brandon gained notoriety for having a high number of relationships with women, sometimes only for one episode, played largely by the series' guest stars. Among the most notable were the troubled Emily Valentine (Christine Elise), who tried to burn down the West Beverly High Homecoming float; the bigoted Brooke Alexander (Alexandra Wilson), who assumed Andrea Zuckerman was rich just because she was Jewish; and sophomore Nikki Witt (Dana Barron), a persistent girl who comically wore down Brandon's defenses during the episode "The Back Story." In Season Four Brandon had an affair with university professor Lucinda Nicholson (Dina Meyer). Ultimately, his longest relationships were with Kelly, who attempted to win Brandon's heart twice throughout the series, succeeding the second time. Their relationship was strengthened after Kelly moved in with him once his parents and Brenda had moved away.

In between relationships with Kelly, Brandon became involved with two of his co-workers. As a junior, he had a passionate relationship with his editor at the California University newspaper, Susan Keats (Emma Caulfield). Brandon and Susan pledged to take a cross-country trip in Summer 1996, but Susan ultimately accepted a position with the Clinton-Gore re-election campaign, leaving Brandon to instead take the trip with Steve.

During his senior year, Brandon slowly fell for the anchor at the CU television station, Tracy Gaylian (Jill Elizabeth Novick). Tracy one day found the engagement ring Brandon tried to give to Kelly in a dresser drawer, and assumed that it was for her. When Brandon explained that it wasn't, Tracy became distrusting of him. The two patched things up, and Brandon agreed to sell back his ring at the jewelry store, exchanging it for a bracelet. Once Brandon left, however, Kelly went to the store and bought the ring for herself. Brandon later took Tracy to Hong Kong to meet his father, but upon their return to the United States, Brandon realized his true feelings for Kelly and broke up with Tracy. Tracy and Brandon reunited in Hawaii in the season 8 opener, leaving Kelly perturbed, but her doubts were erased when she met Tracy's fiancé.

== Missing years ==
It was revealed that Brandon's job in journalism had taken him to many locations around the world. In 2000, he sent a video to Donna and David at the time of their wedding, despite not being able to make it to the ceremony. In the third spin-off, 90210, he was also revealed to have kept in contact with Brenda, Dylan, and Kelly. Dylan is the one who asked Brandon for Brenda's email so he was getting in touch with Brenda.

== 90210 ==
Though Brandon hasn't appeared since the spin-off 90210, Brandon has been mentioned by numerous characters. In "The Jet Set", Brenda tells Kelly that Brandon is currently in Belize and that he thinks Kelly is beautiful. Kelly replies that she has spoken to him as well. Brenda also tells Nat that he still craves Nat's signature megaburgers. However, Dylan – and not Brandon – is revealed to be the father of Kelly's son, Sammy.

In "Model Behavior", Brenda tells Kelly that Brandon had given Dylan her email, which indicates that both he and Dylan are still on good terms. Later, Brenda tells Ryan that she is going to leave Beverly Hills for a while and go visit Brandon and his family. This indicates that Brandon has either gotten married or started a family with an unknown woman.

== Reception ==
The character has a mostly positive reception from critics.
