= We're Not in Kansas Anymore =

- 90210 episode
- Episode no.: Season 1 Episode 1
- Directed by: Mark Piznarski
- Written by: Gabe Sachs and Jeff Judah; Rob Thomas (original pilot)
- Production code: 101
- Original air date: September 2, 2008

Guest appearances
- James Patrick Stuart as Charles Clark; Joe E. Tata as Nat Busschio; Hallee Hirsh as Hannah Vasquez; Riley Thomas Stewart as Sammy McKay; Meghan Markle as Wendy; Brooklyn Sudano as Miss Austin; Brandon Michael Vayda as Mike; Tilly and the Wall as Themselves

Episode chronology
← Previous —	Next → "The Jet Set"
- 90210 (season 1)

"We're Not in Kansas Anymore" is the pilot episode of the American teen drama TV series 90210. It aired on September 2, 2008, on The CW in the United States and Global in Canada. 90210 is a spin-off to Beverly Hills, 90210, and the fourth series in the Beverly Hills, 90210 continuity. The pilot was written by Gabe Sachs, Jeff Judah and Rob Thomas, and directed by Mark Piznarski. The episode, aired with "The Jet Set" in a two-hour premiere, averaged 4.9 million viewers on its original broadcast.

The development of a Beverly Hills, 90210 spin-off by The CW was reported on March 13, 2008; four days later, a detailed breakdown of the pilot written by Thomas was released. Thomas later announced that he was leaving the series, and Sachs and Judah were hired to write a new version of the script. Casting began before the script was completed, and several cast members of the original series were approached, of whom several accepted to appear. Reviews of the episode were mixed, and one critic explained, "it's not a great show but it's not a terrible teen drama, not by a long shot. The new 90210 turns out to be a solid sequel with plenty of shout-outs to fans of the old 90210."

The pilot introduces the Wilson family, along with numerous other students at West Beverly Hills High, where Annie Wilson (Shenae Grimes) and Dixon Wilson (Tristan Wilds) begin attendance. Their father, Harry Wilson (Rob Estes), returns from Kansas to his childhood home of Beverly Hills with his family to care of his mother, former television star Tabitha Wilson (Jessica Walter), who has a drinking problem. Annie and Dixon struggle to adjust to their new lives while making new friends and adhering to their parents' wishes.

== Plot ==
The Wilson family — consisting of parents Harry and Debbie (Lori Loughlin), daughter Annie, and adopted son Dixon arrive at the mansion of Harry's mother, Tabitha. Where they will be taking care of her. Annie and Dixon discuss what their first day of school will be like at West Beverly Hills High, where their father will be the principal. Annie hopes to hook up with a friend named Ethan Ward (Dustin Milligan), whom she met two summers ago. When she arrives at school the next day, Annie spots Ethan in his car and makes eye contact, only to realize that he is receiving fellatio from a fellow student. Dixon goes to journalism class, where he meets Navid Shirazi (Michael Steger), while Annie goes to her first class taught by Ryan Matthews (Ryan Eggold). Matthews asks popular student, Naomi Clark (AnnaLynne McCord), to show Annie around the school. After class, Naomi talks to Annie about her busy life and upcoming sixteenth birthday party. Annie discovers that she is dating Ethan, and meets her best friend, Adrianna Tate-Duncan (Jessica Lowndes), who is the lead in the school play Spring Awakening. Annie, who is also an actress, is upset that she arrived too late to audition for a role, although Adrianna says that she would be better use backstage. Later, Adrianna takes several pills from a drug dealer, and agrees to pay him two hundred dollars the next day.

Annie sees Ethan and promises not to tell Naomi what she saw. They part ways for lunch, and Annie meets Silver (Jessica Stroup); however, Naomi pulls Annie away, explaining that Silver makes insulting YouTube videos about people. Naomi invites Annie to her birthday party, and they decide to go shopping together. Harry and guidance counselor Kelly Taylor (Jennie Garth) and Mr.Matthews meet with Naomi's parents, who feel that Naomi should not have to hand in her assignments on time when she is planning her party. Before she leaves, Naomi's mother, Tracy (Christina Moore), reminds Harry that they dated in high school. Naomi receives a text message from her mother, telling her that she must complete the assignment that night. Annie remembers that she completed a similar assignment for her old school, and offers to give Naomi a copy for inspiration.

Dixon is accepted into the lacrosse team after trying out, but gets into a fight with team member George Evans (Kellan Lutz). Annie tells Dixon of her invitation to Naomi's party, and how she saw Ethan cheating on Naomi. The next day at school, Annie finds out that Silver made a video blog about her, depicting her as a bitchy farmer. Annie confronts Silver, who felt insulted by Annie's decision to hang out with Naomi. When Silver is reprimanded by her half-sister, Kelly, she realizes that she shouldn't reprimand Annie for what happened between her and Naomi in the past. Elsewhere, Ethan is forced by his team members to lie that Dixon started the fight during, and he is subsequently kicked off the team. Annie argues with Ethan because of his lying, and asks what happened to the Ethan that she met two years ago. In class, Naomi reads an exact copy of Annie's paper. Afterward, when Annie confronts Naomi, she apologizes by giving Annie an $800 dress. Annie decides to watch the school play rehearsals, and Silver apologizes for the video by asking the drama teacher to let Annie sing with the chorus for the play. Much to Adrianna's dismay, Annie is allowed to be in the play. Naomi again gets into trouble when Harry discovers that she cheated, and forces her to write the paper in his office. Ethan has a fight with George and tells the truth, resulting in Dixon being allowed to play on the team. Dixon tells Annie that he feels horrible, as he sent a text message to Naomi telling her that Ethan is cheating on her.

Harry and Debbie punish Annie by not allowing her to go to Naomi's party. When they reconsider and decide to let her go, they discover that she has already left. Harry goes to the party to find Annie, but is instead told by Tracy that they have a son together, whom she gave up for adoption over twenty years ago. Adrianna, who had previously stolen money from Naomi's purse, claims to have found it and gives it back. Naomi checks her phone messages and learns that Ethan is cheating on her. Naomi asks Ethan if he is really cheating on her, and leaves the party after he fails to answer. Annie leaves with Silver for another party on the beach, where she apologizes to Ethan for revealing that he was cheating on Naomi. When she asks why he told the truth about Dixon not starting the fight, he replies that he is trying to be the good guy he used to be. Annie, Silver, Dixon and Navid spend the rest of the night swimming at the beach. In the closing scenes, Kelly talks to the father of her four-year-old son, Adrianna pays her drug dealer with money she stole from Naomi, and Ethan visits Naomi's house.

== Production ==
=== Development ===
On March 13, 2008, it was announced that The CW was developing a contemporary spin-off of Beverly Hills, 90210, which first aired on Fox from October 1990 to May 2000. The project was put on the fast track by the network, and an order of the pilot was expected by the end of the month. The Beverly Hills, 90210 creator, Darren Star, was announced not to be involved with the project, as well as producer Aaron Spelling, who died in 2006. The only surviving element from the original series was the Creative Artists Agency, the talent agency that masterminded the spin-off idea. Veronica Mars creator Rob Thomas was in negotiations to write the pilot, and Mark Piznarski was in talks to direct.

"We think this generation of parenting is different than the ones we grew up with. We, as parents, did almost everything that our kids are doing. Our parents didn't do that. It's a lot harder to lie to us. We know what they're doing, and they can't get away with stuff that they think they are because we did it 20 years ago."
—Judah on the themes of parenting in the pilot.

A detailed breakdown of the pilot written by Thomas was released on March 17, containing information on the plot and characters of the series. None of the characters were related to the original series; however, the series' featured a similar premise: a family with two teenagers who recently moved from the Midwest to Beverly Hills. To reflect the situation at the Beverly Hills school, where around 40 percent of the students were from Persian descent, a student named Navid Shirazi was created. Thomas intended to introduce The Peach Pit, the diner from Beverly Hills, 90210, but noted that it would not be featured in the pilot. The writer considered giving the siblings a job at a movie theater, as he did not want them to use their parent's credit cards. Thomas revealed that there were plans to reintroduce one of the original cast members, but had not met with any of them to discuss a role. Thomas later elaborated the producers wanted to see "as many of the original cast members as possible", but were careful not to "parade them all out in the pilot".

On April 14, Thomas announced that he was leaving the series to focus on his two pilots for ABC. Gabe Sachs and Jeff Judah were hired as the new executive producer and wrote a new version of the script in late April. Sachs said that although Thomas had a "great script", their version of the script was "edgier". Judah said that they were trying to ground their script in reality, with real character stories and emotional stories. The writers wanted the audience to relate to the characters' problems, which they wanted to be truthful and emotional, but also comedic. The pair were interested in telling several stories simultaneously, featuring many characters. The pair changed the surname of the family from Mills to Wilson, and told reporters that they would be adding their "comedic impulses" to the script. Sachs and Judah found the parents to be an integral part of the series, and designed them to be contemporary parents. Since the producers were both fathers, they designed the script to include more prominent adult story lines and a strong point of view on parenting. Judah was interested in focusing on how the family kept their moral center when moving to Beverly Hills, and the way the parents dealt with their teenagers.

=== Casting ===
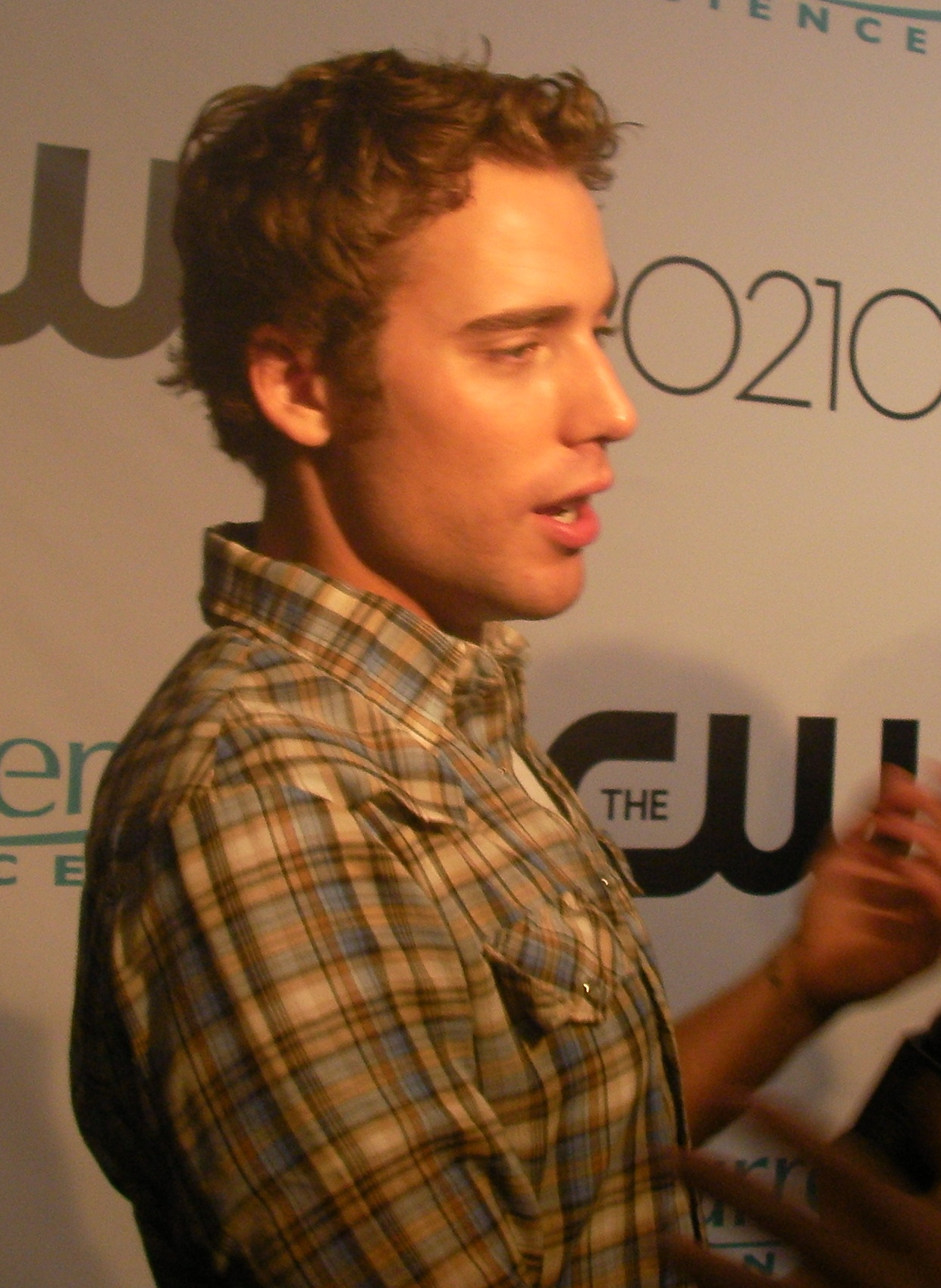
Casting began before the pilot script was completed; Dustin Milligan was the first actor to be cast.

On March 13, Kristin Dos Santos of E! confirmed that the series would be a spin-off with new characters, and not a remake. In order for the project to be ready for the network's "upfront" presentations to advertisers in May, casting began before the script was completed. The first actor to be cast was Dustin Milligan on April 1, followed by AnnaLynne McCord on April 14. Sachs found Milligan to be "really funny", and changed Ethan to better represent his personality. McCord was cast because, according to Sachs, "she's someone who is worldly, and there's a sophistication to her that's interesting". Actress and singer Hilary Duff was rumored to have been offered the part of Annie, but she told reports that it was "not true". The role was eventually given to Shenae Grimes, who says she was raised watching the original series. Sachs and Judah had seen Grimes' work before and knew "she had the acting chops", and she was cast after acting a dramatic scene that she "just killed". Sachs stated, "she can act, she's beautiful, and she can give this sweet cuteness (that lets us see) through her eyes into this world."

Lori Loughlin auditioned for the role of Debbie and was given the part straight away. Sachs thought that Loughlin was too established to read for the part, but realized that she understood the role immediately. The producers were fans of Jessica Walter after watching her film, Play Misty for Me. Sachs found that Walter knew pieces of scenes, and suggested "stuff that works". Sachs described Ryan Eggold, who portrayed Matthews, as "a sophisticated actor, and he's also very funny". Sachs believed that every time Eggold would be on screen, "people are going to go, 'Wow!'".

The producers were looking for an actor who could portray Silver as a "quirky kid who moves to her own beat". Sachs explained that Jessica Stroup "came in dressed for the part, artsy and quirky, and she had her hair up and she had a bandana. She nailed it." The producers were fans of Tristan Wilds for his acting on The Wire, and hoped to hire him as Dixon from the start of casting. When asked about Michael Steger, who portrays Navid, Sachs said "he's just great". Rob Estes, the last actor to join the series, was a previous cast member of the first Beverly Hills, 90210 spin-off, Melrose Place. Estes was sought by The CW to play Harry, but was contracted on the drama Women's Murder Club. When that series was canceled, Sachs called Estes and explained the spin-off to him, and he thought it was a great idea. Sachs promised that although he was playing a parent, he would not "be furniture... as in the seldom seen or heard parents who populate many youth-centric series, like the Walsh parents on the original 90210."

Following rumors of cast members from Beverly Hills, 90210 appearing on the spin-off, The CW confirmed that Shannen Doherty, Jennie Garth, Tori Spelling and Joe E. Tata would be returning in recurring roles as their original characters. Sachs was familiar with Garth, and talked to her about a possible role in the series. Garth agreed to star on the series without reading a script after brainstorming ideas with Sachs. The producers offered Garth a role as a series regular, but she opted to sign on as a recurring character. Doherty decided to appear after talking with Sachs, but her appearance was moved to the second episode. Sachs described Tata's casting as an accident; a friend told Sachs that he had seen Tata in a store, which led to the offer of a recurring role in the series. Sachs said that Tata was ecstatic about the idea and agreed. After reading the script, Spelling expressed interest in returning, and the writers decided to give her character her own fashion line. Spelling was scheduled to appear in the premiere, but for personal reasons and the birth of her daughter, she opted to appear later in the season. On August 11, it was reported that Spelling had pulled out of the series after discovering that she was receiving less pay than Garth and Doherty. Spelling asked for her salary of $20,000 per episode to be increased to match their salaries—$40,000 to $50,000 per episode—but when denied she left the show altogether.

=== Filming ===
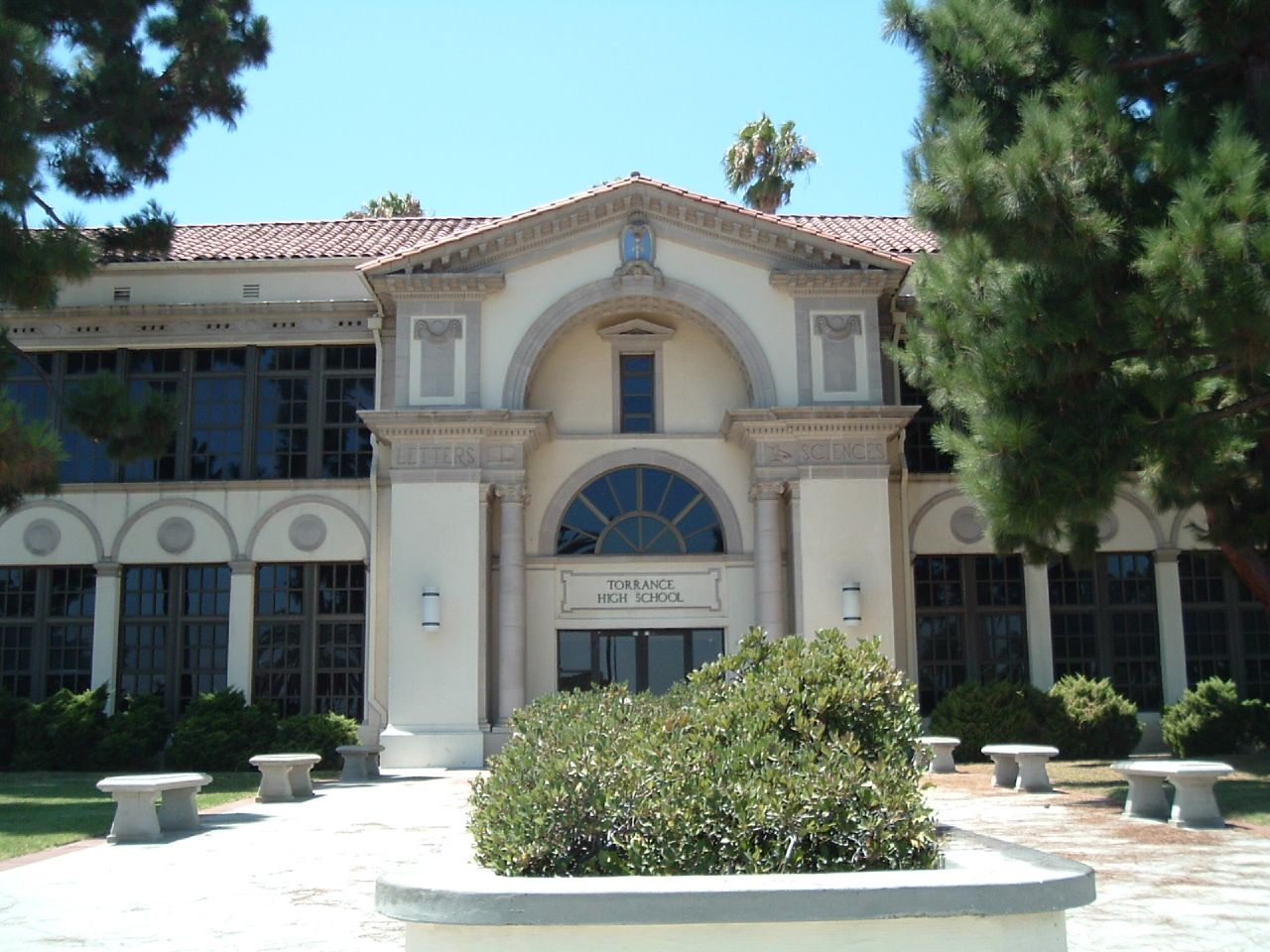
Torrance High School was used to portray West Beverly Hills High in the original 90210 series and the spin-off.

On May 11, 2008, one day before The CW's upfront presentations, the network officially picked up the series for the 2008–2009 television season. Filming for the pilot began in early June in Los Angeles. Torrance High School, which served as the high school in the original series was also used by the spin-off. Filming for the series usually took place in numerous high schools in Torrance and El Segundo, although several scenes were filmed in Torrance High School because of its large auditorium. Sachs returned to the school for the first time after graduating in 1979. Judah announced that the Peach Pit would be back, but as a coffeehouse rather than a diner. Other filming locations included the mansions of the Bel-Air neighborhood and the Hollywood night club Boulevard3. One week prior to the pilot's broadcast, it was confirmed that filming was still taking place, as the producers wanted to reshoot scenes and add extra ones.

== Release ==
=== Broadcast ===
Prior to the season premieres of most television series in September, a common practice by television networks would be to send screeners of pilots of new shows to critics. On August 18, The CW notified critics that they would not be releasing the premiere episodes, saying, "[we] have made the strategic marketing decision not to screen 90210 for any media in advance of its premiere. We're not hiding anything... simply keeping a lid on 90210 until 9.02, riding the curiosity and anticipation into premiere night, and letting all our constituents see it at the same time." Oscar Dahl of BuddyTV speculated that the decision was an indication of the low quality of the episodes, but pointed out that the pilot may not have been finished in time for a screener release, which was later confirmed to be the case. Despite not having watched the episode, the Parents Television Council said in a statement that "if Gossip Girl is any indication of what 90210 will look like, advertisers have plenty of reason to steer clear of the show... No reputable advertiser should even consider sponsoring the show without viewing the content in advance." "We're Not in Kansas Anymore", along with the following episode, averaged 4.9 million viewers throughout the two-hour broadcast on September 2. This gave The CW its highest-rated premiere ever in the adults 18-49 demographic with a 2.6. By comparison, the series finale of the original series was watched by 25 million viewers on its original broadcast in May 2000.

=== Critical reception ===
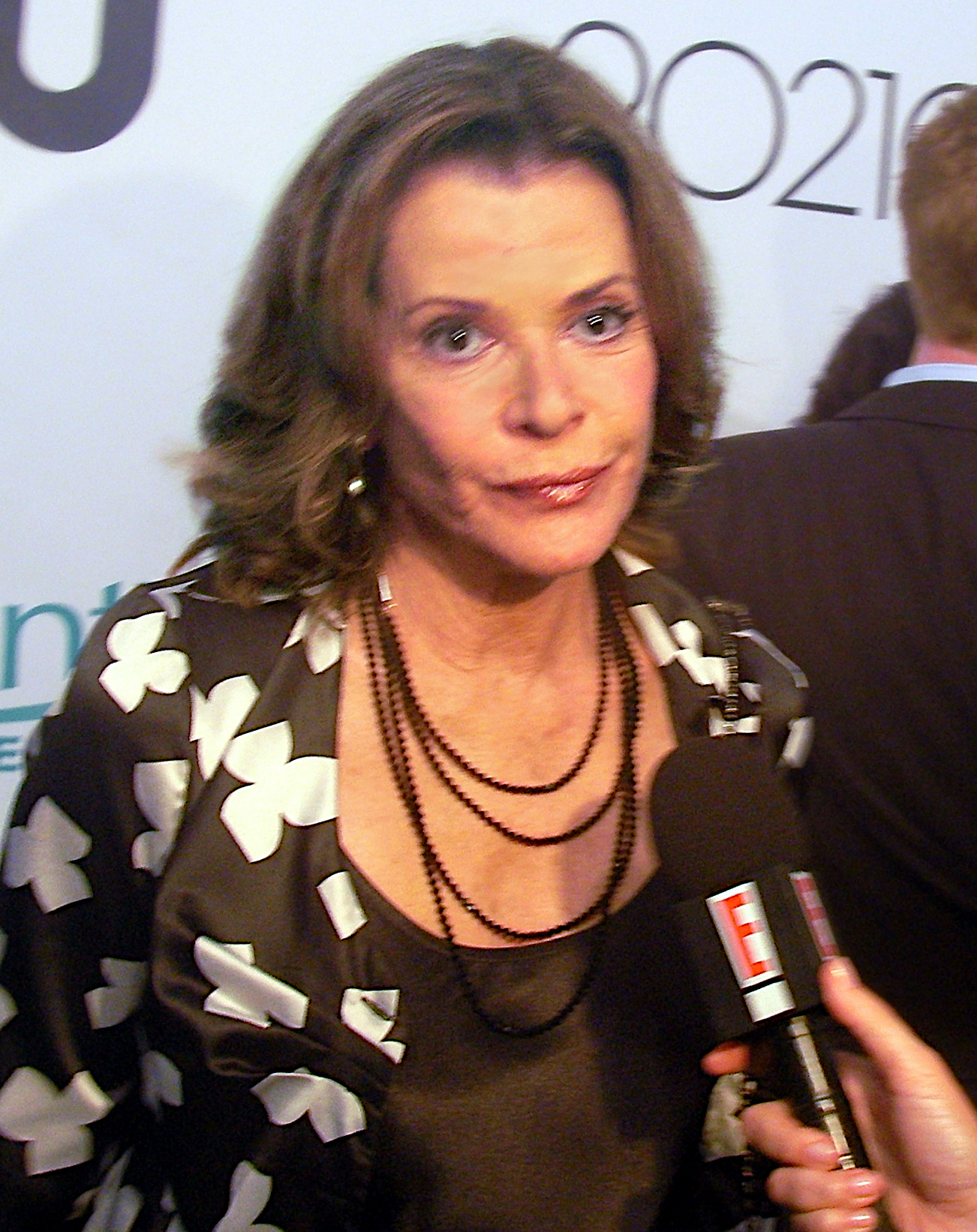
Critics enjoyed Jessica Walter's dialogue, with one citing it as one of the main reasons to watch the series.

Most reviews of the pilot were average, claiming that while it was not bad, it was not great either. Metacritic gave the episode a score—a weighted average based on the impressions of a select 12 critical reviews—of 46, indicating "mixed or average reviews". When compared to the original series, Rob Owen of the Pittsburgh Post-Gazette felt that the spin-off covered the same themes—family, friends, teen melodrama, relationships—but with more humor. Owen praised the compelling characters and the acting, and found the dialogue to be more clever than painful. Adam Buckman of the New York Post commented on the crude language used by the characters, and found there was nothing new that could have surprised him with watching the episode. Ray Richmond of The Hollywood Reporter found that despite The CW's decision not to send out screeners to critics, the pilot was "[not] so horrible after all". Richmond praised the actors and writers, especially returning actor Garth, whom he found looked "terrific" and acted well.

Alan Sepinwall of The Star-Ledger found that while 90210 was neither "trainwreck nor masterpiece", it remained remarkably faithful in tone and spirit to the original series. The reviewer realized that "the dialogue was at times intentionally funny", and pointed out that although the actors looked too old for high school, they acted "a lot more natural" than the actors on the original series. Sepinwall questioned The CW's intended audience, saying that while the music and styles were reminiscent of Gossip Girl, those who had not seen the original series would not have cared for the returning characters. Verne Gay of Newsday described 90210 as a "perfectly competent and reasonably seamless revival", with enough contemporary touchstones to attract new viewers. The reviewer commended the spin-off for integrating the new characters with the originals, while also including adults. Gay found that while the pilot featured too many story lines, the "vibe felt right" and it was not the disaster it was expected to be.

Among the reviews were several negative ones, which compared the series negatively to the original. Matthew Gilbert of The Boston Globe felt that like the original, 90210 was "pretty bad". Gilbert said that the episode "seemed to take forever to set up some remarkably bland plotlines", which he found had been executed with more finesse by other teen soaps. The reviewer criticized the writers for their "unimaginative material", exemplified by the risqué anal sex scene which he opined would no longer be considered outrageous for a series targeted at teenagers. Gilbert claimed that the characters lacked depth and distinction, especially Naomi, whom he compared negatively to Gossip Girl's Blair Waldorf. By contrast, Tom Gliatto of People magazine gave Naomi Clark a favorable review, but stated that he felt the cast as a whole had yet to gel. Ken Tucker of Entertainment Weekly described the pilot as "corny but trying to be hip, crammed with subplots until the producers figure out which ones the audience responds to." Tucker praised Walters acting as a "slashing panache that no one else on screen approaches", and found the only time he laughed with pleasure throughout the pilot was when her character exclaimed, "I'm gonna call Dan Tana's for some takeout!". Hal Boedeker of the Orlando Sentinel described the pilot as "a blah variation on Beverly Hills, 90210", and being too "extravagant and less believable". Boedeker expressed disappointment in the series, and predicted that it would be canceled within a year.
