= Adrianna Tate-Duncan =

- 90210 character
- Jessica Lowndes as Adrianna Tate-Duncan in Season 3 Episode 8
- Portrayed by: Jessica Lowndes
- Duration: 2008–13
- First appearance: 2 September 2008 (episode 1.01; "We're Not in Kansas Anymore")
- Last appearance: 13 May 2013 (episode 5.22; "We All Fall Down")
- Created by: Rob Thomas
In-universe information
- Occupation: Actress singer
- Parents: Constance Tate-Duncan (mother)
- Children: Maisy (daughter, with Ty; given up for adoption)

Adrianna "Ade" Tate-Duncan is a fictional character on The CW television series 90210, the fourth series in the Beverly Hills, 90210 franchise. Portrayed by Jessica Lowndes, the character was originally only scripted as a guest spot in the series' pilot, but was added to the main cast in the fourteenth episode of the first season, replacing Jessica Walter.

== Storylines ==
=== Season 1 ===
At the opening of the series, Adrianna is an aspiring actress and Naomi Clark's best friend. She suffers from a serious drug addiction and is pressured by her mother, Constance, to support the family financially with her acting career. To afford her drug addiction, Adrianna steals money from her affluent best friend, Naomi. She develops a friendly rivalry with Annie due to her equal singing and acting talents, but falls apart when Annie takes over her role in the school play on opening night. When the school undergoes a drug search, Naomi attempts to protect Adrianna by flushing her drugs down the toilet, but is caught and arrested. Even though she promises she will turn herself in to clear Naomi of the charges, Adrianna overdoses before she can. Her Mother checks her into a drug rehabilitation clinic, paid for by classmate Navid Shirazi. As a result, Navid and Adrianna grow closer. During one of his visits to the clinic, Navid helps her reconnect with Naomi by driving to the Homecoming dance, where the two friends reconcile. As a result of his kindness, Adrianna discovers that he has been in love with her since they were children and they begin a relationship.

After discovering one of her ex-boyfriends, Hank, has relapsed after finding out he was HIV positive, Adrianna takes an HIV-test. While she is negative for HIV, the results do reveal she is pregnant but the paternity is still unknown. Adrianna is unsure of the paternity, as her memories of recent sexual experiences have been clouded by her drug addiction. She does, however, know that the child is not Navid's, as they have not yet had sex. She and Navid break up as she reveals that she is pregnant because he doesn't believe that he can deal with her being pregnant with someone else's child. Eventually it is revealed that the baby's father is not Hank (whom she had slept with a few times when she was on drugs), but Ty Collins, her co-star in the school production of Spring Awakening. Naomi's opinion is that she should get an abortion, while Kelly Taylor thinks she should raise it or give it up for adoption. She drives all night and ends up at a clinic, where they tell her she's too far along to get an abortion. Naomi convinces Adrianna to tell Ty, and he tells his parents. Ty's parents tell Adrianna that they will pay for the doctor and anything else she needs. They also say that when she starts to show, they will send her to a retreat in New Mexico, so that nobody finds out, to which she readily agrees. Bolstered by the Collins' support, Adrianna becomes more confident in her ability to deal with her situation. Later, Ty gives Adrianna a contract which states that Adrianna must keep the whole pregnancy a secret and she realizes that their support hides the reality that they are ashamed of her and her unborn child. Adrianna is unwilling to tell her mother about her pregnancy, as she thinks that Constance will throw her out. Naomi convinces Adrianna to call Ty, she thinks that the contract is unfair. Adrianna does so, and Ty's mother comes over to Adrianna's house to discuss the baby with Adrianna's mother. Ty's mother and Adrianna sit down to talk and Constance, Adrianna's mother, finds out about the pregnancy. Ty's mother gets kicked out of the house due to her arrogance and Constance talks to Adrianna and apologizes for putting so much pressure on her and they reconcile.

Adrianna goes to school and decides to tell everyone her 'secret', so she gets help from Navid to announce through the school's video system that she is pregnant and that there is no father. Abandoning his date at the Valentine's Day dance, Navid shows up at Adrianna's house and asks her to be his Valentine and she accepts. A short while later, Navid proposes and she says yes. After Navid's mother approaches Adrianna and tells her that she thinks she should give the baby up, Adrianna takes prescription drugs to combat the stress. After this, she tells Navid that she knows she has to give the baby away. Later, at the prom, Navid and Ty scuffle when Navid becomes irate about Ty ignoring Adrianna and Adrianna subsequently goes into labor. She has a daughter whom she gives up for adoption and the adoptive parents name her Maisy.

=== Season 2 ===
It is revealed that childhood friends Adrianna and Erin Silver have grown close once again during the summer through their mutual friendships with Naomi. Naomi and Silver have been in summer school due to Annie Wilson busting Naomi's post-Prom party. Navid and Adrianna's relationship has been progressing slowly, and while he is ready to take it to the next level, even going as far as to rent a cabana, she isn't, and still wants to wait. Meanwhile, Adrianna runs into her childhood boyfriend, Teddy Montgomery, causing jealousy in Navid, due to their close relationship and Naomi, who has taken a liking to Teddy. The end of the first episode shows Adrianna and Naomi comforting Silver over her issues with Dixon and beginning their first day back at school, with Naomi proclaiming that this was going to be "their" year. Adrianna and Teddy kiss on his father's yacht. Adrianna felt bad and went back and slept with Navid. They later kiss again. Adrianna tells him that he shouldn't have done that and walks away. Adrianna receives her 6-month chip for sobriety at a meeting, and has also been in contact with Silver's mom. In "Wild Alaskan Salmon" she breaks up with Navid for Teddy and she said to Teddy she liked their relationship but he says he didn't want a relationship and she walks away confused. Then she goes to Navid telling him she wanted to reunite but he says no and he says he knew about her and Teddy and then he says it was not Silver that told him but that it was Teddy who told him. Later in "Unmasked" she begins to avoid Teddy because of what he did to her. In "Women's Intuition" Adrianna fails at winning Navid back, and thus, begins another downward spiral when she witnesses Navid flirting with other girls, and Teddy flirting with Silver. She purchases drugs from Jasper, the boyfriend of her old friend Annie. Navid later sees Adrianna buying drugs from Jasper at school. He confronts her about it but she angrily denies it. Naomi later finds her drugs at her house and leaves angry at her for lying.

When Adrianna finds out about the death of Silver's mother and Navid's injury, she decides to make a change for the better. She gets rid of all her drugs and tells Navid that she plans on working on herself, because she realized that even though during the previous year when she was off drugs she had been acting like an addict, as in, extremely dependent on him. Then, at the Winter Wonderland dance, she sees Jasper with Annie. During an intervention for Annie, Adrianna comes clean and tells her that she purchased the drugs from him and that she's willing to come forward if she has to. Navid tells her that she shouldn't because she'll get expelled. Adrianna's strength and selflessness helps her begin to mend friendships with Silver and Naomi. The three also befriend Annie once they learn the truth about Jen. Adrianna also finds companionship in Gia, fellow West Bev Blazer and former addict. They become close, helping each other out during troubled times. Adrianna helps Gia move on from her ex. Gia convinces Ade to audition to be in an all-female band, and when Gia confesses to Adrianna that she has feelings for her, Adrianna herself begins to question if their friendship could turn into something more. After a heart-to-heart with Gia, Adrianna comes to the realisation that she reciprocates Gia's feelings and the two then embark on a relationship. During the early stages of the relationship, Adrianna is reluctant to be public with their relationship much to Gia's dismay but after Adrianna performs live with 'The Glorious Steinems' she walks up to Gia to kiss her in front of the audience, after realising that it shouldn't matter what others think.

Adrianna is then approached by Ivy's mother, Laurel, who hopes to sign her as a solo singer. Put in the awkward situation of having to choose between staying in the band or going solo she talks to Navid and comes to the conclusion that she should go with the latter. Adrianna then has a heated argument with Gia due to the fact that Adrianna chose to speak with Navid about her doubts rather than Gia and causes Gia to walk out. While at a party, Adrianna and Laurel have a talk and Laurel tells Adrianna to follow her heart and leave the party to find Gia. Adrianna takes this advice and arrives at Gia's place only to walk in on Gia with her ex, causing Adrianna to leave.

As Adrianna's music career begins to take off, Laurel has her write a song which turns into a duet between her and famous singer Javier. The two feel an instant connection and things heat up fast while Navid realizes that he still has feelings for her and decides that he's going to do what he can to win her back. Adrianna gives up on Navid because she thinks he doesn't like her anymore. Navid leaves a bracelet for Adrianna and a note saying "Meet me on the Roof." After Adrianna performs, she is offered a trip to New York to sing with Javier, before she can see the bracelet. Navid sees them leave and thinks that Adrianna chose Javier. Then Javier pretends the bracelet is from him. However, when shooting a live segment for The Blaze, Navid sees the bracelet and asks to speak with Adrianna alone. They fight about the bracelet and Adrianna realizes that it was from Navid because all her favourite things are on there, including the date they first kissed. Adrianna and Navid reunited but Javier offers Adrianna a chance open for Javier's tour, which is all year long.

=== Season 3 ===
Adrianna and Javier are involved in a car crash, which kills Javier. Before the crash happened, Javier revealed to Adrianna that her music career is over, because Javier is jealous of Adrianna and Navid's relationship. Adrianna receives a bag with her belongings and a book full of original songs by Javier, which she keeps to use as her own material.

She sings one of Javier's songs at the memorial, which is attended by Javier's uncle and when he realizes the song was Javier's he threatens to ruin her career. However, they make a deal that if he (Victor) becomes her manager, he won't tell her secret. She agrees and decides to record the rest of Javier's songs. Soon, Adrianna finds herself becoming one of the most famous upcoming starlets in Hollywood and it begins to get to her head. She becomes vapid and vain and oblivious to her friends and starts bossing Victor around. Eventually Victor becomes fed up and reveals Adrianna's secret to the world just as her career really begins to take off, and just as Navid starts to fall in love with Silver, her best friend, unbeknownst to her.

While Navid and Silver begin an affair behind her back, Adrianna scrambles to regain her fame and is now in debt. Out of desperation, she agrees to sell a story to a tabloid regarding the baby she gave up for adoption. Navid, upset how Adrianna used the baby to make money, breaks up with her. Adrianna attempts to reunite with Navid, and finds an earring in his bedroom after he rejects her. She leans on Silver for support, believing that the real reason why Navid had broken up with her is because he had been cheating on her. Soon, reality producers begin following her and her friends around while trying to shoot a pilot. Adrianna and Navid get into an argument and he finally admits to having cheated on her. Once again, Adrianna runs to Silver for support, claiming that she wants to find out who the girl he cheated with is so that she can destroy her. Unbeknownst to her, it's Silver, who clearly begins to subtly crack under the pressure of her guilty conscience.

While filming more scenes for the show, Adrianna makes a startling discovery. After much investigation, she realizes that it was Silver who Navid had been cheating with. Heartbroken, Adrianna cries to herself, but later masks her hurt with a plot for revenge. Instead of confronting them, she decides to mess with Silver's guilty conscience by acting oblivious. She plays on Silver's conscience by telling her and Naomi that she believes that Lila, Navid's ex-girlfriend, was the girl Navid had been cheating with and that she plans to send a naked picture of Lila to the entire school for her revenge. Knowing that she has to stop Adrianna, Silver decides to come clean and admit that she was the one who Navid had cheated on her with. Adrianna admits that she knew it was her all along and ultimately sends a naked picture of Silver to the entire school. The group takes a trip to Mexico for the spring break, where Adrianna and Silver's feud continues. Upon their return home, Adrianna asks Silver to put it behind them and she eagerly and happily agrees. However, the next scene shows that Adrianna's willingness to make up is insincere as she exchanges Silver's bipolar medication for unknown pills. The effect of this is enormous on Silver who goes through a lengthy manic episode followed by a sudden depressive state. Adrianna's vengeful prank causes Silver to lose any chance of attending her dream school, NYU, and lands Silver in the psychiatric ward at the local hospital. Adrianna visits the hospital, pretending to be a caring friend, and takes Navid home, giving him alcohol and falling asleep next to him on a bed.

When she realizes he was drunk and forgot what happened last night, she claims they kissed. Being rejected later, she goes to Silver and tells her Navid kissed her. At a party for Ivy and Raj, Silver's stolen medicine falls out of her purse and all her friends turn their backs on her, which makes her think about committing suicide. She decides not to and resolves to become a better person.

=== Season 4 ===
Adrianna comes back from Africa and visits Silver at her apartment to try to reconcile but is rejected. She then shows up at Naomi's party to apologize again, but Silver again rejects her saying she doesn't think she can ever trust Adrianna again. Dixon Wilson then walks over and comforts her. While Dixon is standing on the balcony of his new condo, Ade walks out in just a T-shirt and tells him she came over to see him because she needed someone to talk to, but she ran into Austin, his new roommate and it is hinted that they might have slept together, but Austin later tells Dixon they just made out a little bit and nothing else. Adrianna starts hanging around Dixon's apartment and the boys seem a little annoyed by her presence, especially Austin. After it is decided that Dixon tell her to leave, she tells him that she is going home, and that the only reason why she came to see him and been hanging around is because Dixon has been nice and sweet and is the only one who doesn't see her as pure evil. Dixon then helps her get a job as a waitress at Liam Court's new bar. Adrianna continues to try to regain the trust of her friends, though she soon succeeds her goal in Liam and Dixon, the other members of their group still refuse to trust her. Adrianna then soon suspects that Dixon has a drug problem. She is later proven right when in Vegas she follows the gang there to ensure Dixon does not succumb to his newfound drug addiction or previous gambling addiction. Ade comes across him as he prepares to snort some drugs, and after an emotional confrontation the two kiss and have real sex.

When Annie discovers them, she accuses Adrianna of seducing Dixon and bringing the drugs. Fed up with everyone treating her terribly, Adrianna lashes out at Annie, and declares she is there to help Dixon who also comes to her defense. Dixon attempts to start a relationship with Adrianna but she denies him, fearful that he might become dependent on her only so that he can avoid dealing with his own problems. Once Dixon goes through rehab Adrianna decides to give him a chance and they begin a relationship. She becomes worried when he quickly reenters the music industry that he might begin using drugs. Dixon decides to use a song Adrianna sang at a benefit for Raj, their friend Ivy Sullivan's husband, and remix it to include his own lyrics. When he shows her his version of the song and tells her that he's going to submit it to a record company, she becomes outraged, believing that he's using her song to just to get ahead in the music industry. When Dixon decides not to perform the song at an event and instead sings a song about how he is sorry, she forgives him. Adrianna later reveals to Dixon that the song is actually about Maisie, the daughter she gave away to pursue a career in the entertainment business as an actress/singer. This sets up the storyline for the latter half of the second season which will begin in 2012 where Adrianna will deal with the repressed repercussions of giving the baby up for adoption as she attempts to reconnect with her child. Adrianna also reveals to Dixon that she wants to collaborate with him musically as they both share a strong passion for music as an art form of expression.

Adrianna learns from Navid that Silver is dating the adoptive father of her child Maisie and that they're planning on moving to New York City. Upset at the possibility that Silver might raise her daughter, Adrianna pays a surprise visit to Maisie picking her up from daycare pretending to be Greg's girlfriend. Silver soon finds Adrianna and Maisie and the two have an emotional reunion but Silver's relationship with Greg comes to an end when he learns that Adrianna has met Maisie under the impression that Silver introduced the two of them to each other. Dixon and Adrianna continue to collaborate musically and he asks her to move in with him once they tell each other that they're in love with one another and soon after land a meeting with a major movie producer to discuss music on his next film, but are sabotaged by Vanessa, Liam's girlfriend, who is trying to work behind the scenes to make Liam a movie star. Eventually Adrianna and Dixon land a spot in a musical festival alongside the band Train. Dixon is offered a recording contract by a record executive, but not Adrianna. Adrianna tells Liam about her suspicions that Vanessa may have staged the near-drowning incident which brought him spotlight fame. But Vanessa soon learns about Adrianna's suspicions and she successfully frames Adrianna for assaulting her. However, Dixon believes Adrianna while Liam believes that Vanessa was attacked by Adrianna. To help get over the ordeal with Vanessa, Dixon and Adrianna continue to work on music.

Dixon collapses while arguing in the recording studio with Adrianna, and he is taken to the hospital for observation where he and Ade learn that he has a congenital heart condition and he only has 5 years left to live. Adrianna decides to quit making music with him as she feels guilty for putting too much pressure on him when in reality Dixon is dealing with his own guilt about lying to Adrianna as he secretly signed a solo recording contract behind her back. Navid arrives back in town for a visit where Dixon confesses to him the truth but admits he did not tell Adrianna because the label didn't want to sign her. Dixon also accepts a gig to go on tour to play backup for Haley Reinhart, but doesn't tell Adrianna, but she later finds out anyway and forces him to choose either her or his career. He chooses his career over her. Soon after Austin returns to Los Angeles and offers to be Adrianna's new manager, suggesting she start singing country music as a change of tune to her career after Dixon leaves town without saying goodbye. Austin enlists his father, Judd Ridge, to help launch Adrianna's new country-western career as a side act. Adrianna deals with Dixon leaving her by writing songs, two of which she sings live at different events. Eventually Dixon decides returns from touring with his band where he calls Adrianna to give their relationship a second chance. Adrianna agrees, but soon regrets it when Dixon fails to show up at their meeting spot and she thinks he bailed on her again, but in reality he gets into a fatal car accident with his bandmates. During the final moment of the season, Adrianna leaves town with Austin to go on tour as the latest country-western star and him as her manager.

=== Season 5 ===
Adrianna continues her country music tour, unaware that Dixon has gotten into a life-threatening car accident and is in a coma in a hospital back in Los Angeles. 'Ade' then has an unforgettable evening after another show in Las Vegas when she hooks up with a handsome stranger named Taylor. Annie finally manages to contact Ade in Vegas and gets her to return to Los Angeles to be with an unconscious Dixon, and the two girls decide to move into the beach apartment together. Adrianna soon learns that Taylor has become Liam and Navid's business partner and she fails at attempting to avoid him after she becomes confused about her feelings toward him after he kisses her. Dixon, unaware of what has happened between Ade and Taylor, encourages Ade to hire Taylor to create her new music video concept. After Taylor dares Adrianna to show him how sexy she can be, she realizes that she has feeling for him. As Dixon continues to recuperate, Adrianna confides in Annie that she and Dixon are having intimacy issues. After her relationship with Dixon is over, Ade decides to pay much more attention to her friends and mainly with Silver. The two make a show in a truck where they can interview people about their clients. However, when Naomi and Annie's stepbrother Mark comes in between the two, they promise not to have a date with him and put their friendship over this. After Naomi's party night, Silver hooks up with Mark and later confides it to Ade, leaving Ade confused and worried about their friendship.

The series ends with Adrianna and Navid back together.

== Development ==
The character of Adrianna was originally scripted as a guest spot in the series' pilot. When Lowndes was cast, she only knew that her character was a singer in the school musical, and as a singer herself, she was excited to sing on television. However, Lowndes was surprised when "they chopped my hair off, and wrote this amazing material for me in which I had a drug addiction and I was dying. I honestly didn't know where it was going." The day after she filmed the drug overdose scene, Lowndes was offered series regular status. Michael Ausiello of Entertainment Weekly reported that the character was upgraded because she created more storyline.

When Lowndes realized her character was a drug addict, she did a lot of research and talked to real recovering addicts in Vancouver and over the phone. She did not "want to make light of it since I didn't have those experiences myself". Upon revelation of Adrianna's pregnancy in the series, Lowndes said that the fate of the baby was still undecided. The actress also explained that Ty and Adrianna had been together before that night at the hotel, as shown in episode "Wide Awake and Dreaming". To create Adrianna's "rough" look during her drug addiction, Lowndes had to sit through "an hour of intense white makeup on my face and red and gray under my eyes to create broken capillaries". For her character's pregnancy, Lowndes said she couldn't wait to wear a heavy pregnancy belly. The actress said that "by the end of the day my back and feet are killing, so I feel like a real pregnant lady".

Speaking about Adrianna's lesbian relationship with Gia, Lowndes said that it was important that the characters act like any other couple on the series. Lowndes said that "there has been a response from people who have come up to me who have been affected by it. This is truly going on in high school and people are confused and I love that we're showing somebody like my character, who is confused." Lowndes was pleased with the direction of Adrianna's storyline when her character began a music career. Lowndes, who is herself a singer, was able to sing in most of the latter episodes of the season. The actress said, "it's so exciting, and all different musical styles, as well. It's awesome that we got a third-season pickup and there's going to be a lot more music in the third season as well. That's what I'm doing when I'm not working on 90210, I'm working on my album. So I love it, it's a dream come true."

== Reception ==
Actress Lowndes acknowledged that initial response to her character was "a little negative — people loved to hate me, and my haircut". However, she felt that reception became more positive afterward, and recovering addicts told her that she depicted it in a real way. Lowndes thought that people could relate to what she was going through, and that people are "going to like her even more as we go on". Lowndes defended the character's earlier behavior, saying, "I never know what they're going to write, but I think drugs made her who you saw at the beginning. I think she's a good person who has a good heart."

After Adrianna's overdose in the seventh episode, "Hollywood Forever", several critics believed that she had died. Tanya Lane of Poptimal was displeased with the writing of the storyline, citing inconsistencies as the reason. Lane felt that the writers did not address the situation well, and did not like that the storyline picked up with Adrianna "enjoying a luxurious stay at a star-studded rehab", whereas the previous episode had ended with her overdosing. Lane was also critical of Adrianna's relationship with Navid, "apparently Navid has always been in love with her, though I can't recall the two of them having a single conversation in any of the previous episodes [...] Her character is very messy, so I find it rather odd that the writers are tying the loose ends up with a neat little bow."

M.L. House of TV.com praised the writers for slowly building the lesbian romance between Adrianna and Gia. House said, "while most shows are clearly going for a ratings stunt any time girls make out, these two are truly falling for each other. It even seems natural, given Adrianna's shady past with men [...] Bravo!"
