= Naomi Clark (90210 character) =

Fictional character from 90210

- 90210 character
- AnnaLynne McCord as Naomi Clark
- Portrayed by: AnnaLynne McCord
- Duration: 2008–13
- First appearance: September 2, 2008 (episode 1.01; "We're Not in Kansas Anymore")
- Last appearance: May 13, 2013 (episode 5.22; "We All Fall Down")
- Created by: Rob Thomas; Gabe Sachs; Jeff Judah
In-universe information
- Occupation: Event planning assistant Socialite and Heiress
- Parents: Charles Clark (father); Tracy Clark (mother)
- Siblings: Jen Clark (older sister); Mark Holland (maternal half-brother)
- Spouse: Max Miller (ex-husband)

Naomi Clark, played by AnnaLynne McCord, is a fictional character from the CW primetime drama 90210, the fourth series of the Beverly Hills, 90210 franchise. The character was created by Rob Thomas, Gabe Sachs and Jeff Judah, with later developments by Rebecca Sinclair, and occasional input from McCord.

During early stages of production, Naomi was largely described as a privileged and popular socialite and West Beverly High's "queen bee." Prior to the series' premiere, Sachs and Judah would further develop Naomi into an antiheroine with a number of flaws, virtues, and familial issues. In the second season, Sinclair, the new show-runner, maintained the previous developments but presented a more comedic take on the character. McCord has expressed fondness for the multi-faceted nature of the role, citing it as a factor in her decision to accept the part.

Often regarded as the show's central figure, Naomi has received critical acclaim from the Los Angeles Times, Entertainment Weekly, People magazine, and other media outlets. Reviews have praised AnnaLynne McCord's performance and the complexity of the role. Conversely, Clark has also been a recipient of criticism, particularly during the second season. For her work in the role, McCord was nominated for a Teen Choice Award in 2009, and won a Breakthrough of the Year Award in 2010.

== Season 1 ==
=== Creation ===
Naomi Clark was initially developed by the series' original show-runner, Rob Thomas, who was succeeded by Gabe Sachs and Jeff Judah prior to the premiere. Early press releases described the character as a privileged, beautiful and popular Queen Bee of West Beverly Hills High, prompting the media to draw comparisons to Kelly Taylor of Beverly Hills, 90210, the first series of the franchise which launched 90210. As production of the spin-off began, the part would become more defined, with actress AnnaLynne McCord, who received the role, labeling Naomi an intelligent girl who possessed both manipulative and sensitive sides. She further described the character as "kind of a chameleon", stating that "she'll be someone with the principal and then someone else with her mother and then someone else with her friend."

Sachs also described Naomi as a layered character whose nature would be explored as the series progressed. With regard to playing such roles, McCord stated, "I tend to reach out to people like Clark because I can see they are putting on a facade and are not as bad as they seem. They will eventually let their guard down and become nice people." The actress opted not to review the original series before beginning her role in the spin-off, expressing a desire for Naomi to have her own identity.

Prior to being cast in 90210, McCord had begun building a reputation for playing vixens and antiheroines, notably via the role of Eden Lord in the FX series Nip/Tuck. After declining two offers to play Naomi, she eventually accepted in April 2008, believing that her exposure on the show would help to benefit the charities she was involved in. McCord was able to offer the creators her input on the character following her casting. Additionally, she was the second performer and the first actress to be cast.

=== Introduction ===
Naomi is introduced as a rich girl who attends West Beverly Hills High. Her first on-screen birthday coincides with the birth of the series, during which several aspects of the character's personality are revealed. Self-esteem is shown to be one of Naomi's biggest virtues and vices early on. When she is assigned to work with new student Annie Wilson (Shenae Grimes), she initially appears snobbish and withdrawn. Afterward, she unveils a more pleasant demeanor as the two spend time together, but also reveals an opportunistic side by attempting to plagiarize one of Annie's papers. Upon being caught, however, she becomes offended when others express doubts about her ability, and seeks to prove that she can complete the work herself.

Naomi is gradually shown to have a friendly nature during her introduction, inviting Annie to her birthday party when asked to, while fidelity is revealed to be of importance to her as well. When her personal life is explored, she is shown to value her longtime boyfriend Ethan Ward (Dustin Milligan). However, her birthday party is disrupted by the news that Ethan has been unfaithful to her.

Social power is also said to be a priority of Naomi's in early episodes, along with social prominence. According to Erin Silver (Jessica Stroup), who is commonly called by her surname Silver, the two were best friends until an ambitious Naomi told various people that Silver's father had cheated on her mother with a much younger woman.

=== Progression ===
Several of the foundations laid in the opening episodes are built upon as the series progresses. In the third episode, Naomi is traumatized by the discovery that her father is having an affair. In episode four, she is shown to maintain a close relationship with Ethan, despite their break-up, turning to him for comfort. She again reveals a friendly side when she pacifies Ethan's autistic brother. Later, she is presented with an opportunity to confront her father's mistress, and boldly does so. She and Erin Silver also take steps toward reconciliation. Afterward, Naomi schemes to save her parents' marriage, though her efforts are ultimately in vain. When her friend Adrianna (Jessica Lowndes) encounters problems due to her drug habit, Naomi's good will is displayed again, as she eventually steps in and attempts to intervene. In the eighth episode, her intelligence is further hinted at when it is revealed that Naomi speaks Spanish.

Though their personalities differ at times, several of Naomi's issues parallel those of Kelly Taylor (Jennie Garth) from the original series. Early on in the show, she values her 'in-crowd' status and experiences repeated friction with a friend over a boy (as Kelly did). When Annie begins bonding with Ethan, Naomi reveals that the situation is likely to interfere with their friendship. Annie's eventual dismissal of this statement leads to a temporary rift between the girls. Also like Kelly, Naomi endures the experience of a family torn apart by adultery, and is later faced with the matter of an absent parent, as her mother departs town unexpectedly. After her parents have officially split, Naomi seeks temporary refuge in a hotel.

Later, Naomi dates a West Beverly student named Liam Court (Matt Lanter). At Naomi's after-prom party, Jen (Sara Foster), her sister, seduces Liam to get back at Naomi for defying her and holding the event at their house. Naomi catches the aftermath (sans Jen) and finds Annie's wrap with Liam, causing her to publicly accuse Annie of sleeping with him. She is last shown being comforted by Jen while police sirens are heard due to Annie reporting the underage drinking.

== Season 2 ==
=== Impact ===
During the initial development of 90210, the character Annie Wilson was conceived as the central role of the series. As the first season progressed, however, AnnaLynne McCord gained recognition as the show's breakout performer in the role of Naomi. Media outlets began referring to McCord as the series' lead throughout Seasons 1 and 2; the actress was also nominated for a Teen Choice Award in the category of "Breakout Star Female" in 2009. Rebecca Sinclair, the series' show-runner, had also become impressed with Naomi's portrayal. Though McCord's cast billing would remain the same in the second season, Naomi Clark was placed "front and center", largely becoming the show's central character.

Several of the series' story lines in Season 2 are shown to have various ties to Naomi, including the deepening of Jen Clark's duplicity, the shaken state of Annie Wilson, and the development of a sensitive side in the character of Liam Court. In addition, Silver and Adrianna, who did not associate often in the first season, are shown to have grown closer in the second through their mutual bonds with Naomi. Shortly after the second season premiered, articles from Entertainment Weekly and MSN applauded the increased focus on McCord's character. The actress also promoted the series on Live with Regis and Kelly and The Tonight Show with Conan O'Brien.

=== Direction ===
At the beginning of Season 2, McCord reported that producers would be taking her character into "more comedic" territory. "I don't really consider myself funny, but they wanted her to go along this route, so I'm learning alongside Naomi how to be funny." The actress also claimed that Naomi would continue to display an "ever-emerging heart," and that "at the end of the day, she's the most loyal friend you’ll have—as long as you don't screw her." With regard to the character's appearance, McCord described Naomi as "beautiful," but requested that her makeup be limited in Season 2, stating that "the girls who are watching the show don’t need to see a girl portraying seventeen caked up in all this makeup."

=== Story lines ===
The second season opens on Naomi completing her final day of summer school, which she'd been forced to attend due to the underage drinking at her party. It is revealed that she, Silver, and Adrianna have formed a friendly trio during the summer. Naomi briefly dates an older man who she later discovers is married, leading her to break up with him. She is still upset at Annie and considers revenge after obtaining naked pictures of her. She hesitates to act at first, but is later encouraged to by Jen, widening the rift between her and Annie. Later, after she escapes some of Jen's influence, Naomi visits California University, and grows close to the dean's son, Richard, along with a boy named Jamie.

Following the death of Silver's mother, Jackie, Naomi provides Erin with comfort. Soon afterward, Naomi learns the truth about Jen's actions on the night of the prom, creating a rift between the two. Naomi then offers Annie her apologies. Annie initially keeps her at a distance, while Liam, after much effort, is eventually given a second chance with Naomi. Later, she begins to encounter awkwardness with Liam. After clashing with Mr. Cannon (Hal Ozsan), a faculty member, Naomi falsely accuses him of sexual harassment while talking with her friends, who unexpectedly urge her to come forward with the experience. As with her attack on Annie, she initially declines to act. However, she eventually does so when Liam faces expulsion for assaulting Cannon. She is later called to testify in front of the school board, which prompts her to reveal the truth. Afterward, Naomi faces new conflicts with her sister Jen, while Liam eventually leaves Naomi upon deciding that their relationship is no longer working. While experiencing trouble with her car one evening, she seeks assistance in school and stumbles upon Mr. Cannon. He kisses Naomi repeatedly as she refuses and pushes him away, but he continues and eventually rapes her.

== Season 3 ==
=== Direction ===
In an interview with E!, McCord revealed what she expected for Naomi after she was attacked at the end of Season 2. "I kinda feel like there will be some downward spiral in a way for Naomi's character, but she's good at covering, so she'll still have that facade." In a later interview with HollywoodLife.com, she further stated, "For me, it's important to let all teenagers know, and all women know, if you're violated you have to speak up." The actress also expressed a personal investment in the story, having worked with victims of abuse in a real-life anti-trafficking organization.

=== Story lines ===
In the Season 3 premiere, it is revealed that Naomi spent the summer at a motel. She later decides to press charges against Cannon, but becomes discouraged from going through with the process. In the second episode, she gains access to her trust fund upon turning 18. Later, her friends attempt to help prove that Cannon raped her. She and Jen reconcile in the process. Eventually, Naomi and the police obtain new evidence against Cannon. However, Cannon disappears before he can be arrested. She then begins moving forward in her personal life. When she returns to her hotel room after Adrianna's Christmas party, Mr. Cannon is shown waiting for her unnoticed. He later holds both Naomi and Silver captive, though they eventually manage to subdue him and call the police. While recovering from her last encounter with Mr. Cannon, she takes up meditation, leading her to cross paths with a guru who cons her out of a large sum of money. Naomi later retrieves the money with the help of her science partner, Max (Josh Zuckerman). Naomi is shocked to find herself beginning to like Max, and they soon begin a relationship. At the end of the third season, Naomi tells Max that she is pregnant.

== Season 4 ==
The fourth season begins with Naomi breaking up with Max after what she feels is his excessive relief on discovering that her pregnancy was a false positive. Attempting to make a big impression at California University (CU), Naomi buys a large house, coming into conflict with the owner's son Austin Tallridge (Justin Deeley), who had been growing marijuana on the property. Naomi throws a big elaborate beginning of school party for CU students but this backfires when the party is raided by the police and Naomi disposes of Austin's marijuana plants by tossing them on a bonfire, causing CU's star quarterback to later test positive for drug use. The disastrous party causes Naomi to enter CU as the most unpopular girl in school, a situation she attempts to rectify by pledging a popular sorority. Initially things appear to be going well as Naomi is taken under the wing of the sorority President, Holly (Megalyn Echikunwoke). But after performing a series of humiliating hazing rituals, Naomi discovers that Holly never intended to let her into the sorority and that this was all done to humiliate Naomi. Vowing revenge, Naomi buys her way into the only sorority that will have her: one made up of nerds and social rejects, and becomes their president. Naomi has sex with Austin after he agrees to help her new sorority humiliate Holly. However, she later learns that Austin was using her to break up with Holly, whom he had been dating. When Holly invites Max to a campus event to unsettle Naomi, she rekindles her romance with him, but still finds herself attracted to Austin. At a talent show fundraiser for Raj (Manish Dayal), Naomi becomes obsessed with outdoing Austin's new 'girlfriend', who is really his cousin who's staying with him for the week. After surprising a clueless Max during their performance, Max breaks things off with Naomi, saying he can't be the guy who's okay with his girlfriend having feelings for someone else. Naomi and Austin then embark on a relationship. In Project Runway, Naomi is thrilled to compete in CU's fashion design competition, but her excitement quickly dies down when she finds out she's competing against nemesis Holly. The two waste no time in trying to one-up each other, with Naomi donating a large sum of money to the competition's fashion show so that her fashions can be showcased in the most flattering way.

When she reveals she'll have the ab-man himself Liam, modeling her designs, Holly goes behind her back and books him through his modeling agency. But that's not all she steals; the night of the fashion show, Naomi discovers that Holly's ripped off her designs and the two end up in a full-blown fight backstage. Though neither gal wins the competition, Naomi gets an internship offer from a Hollywood event planner, and the two dueling divas decide to call a truce. Holly also wanted the internship with the influential planner, who just happens to be her mother. In O Holly Night, Naomi tries to earn her stripes as an intern, at the expense of her friendship with Holly and relationship with Austin, ultimately. Naomi tries to pull double duty both working and playing at Holly's birthday bash, though she is pretty quickly outed as the person who "stole" the internship at her mom's party planning firm.

In Should Old Acquaintance Be Forgot?, Naomi is still rocking her party-planning internship under Rachel's guidance. Her relationship with Austin has ended after Austin allegedly cheated on her with Holly. Austin says Holly snuck in and attacked him right after he came out of the shower but Naomi refuses to listen to him. Naomi has been so hard at work that her boss, Holly's mother, gives Naomi the responsibility of hosting her very own event, which is the debutant ball. During the ball, Naomi has rebound sex with a stranger in order to get over Austin. After Naomi has been caught in front of the entire party, Rachel fires her. However, Naomi tells her that Rachel's daughter cheated with her boyfriend. Rachel has sympathy and lets it slide but advises Naomi that she has to be a strong woman and deal with her problems. In Mama Can You Hear Me?, Naomi decides to become a ‘New Naomi’ and try to patch things between Holly and her mother. Rachel briefs Naomi about the impending award season. She entrusts Naomi with a very important assignment. Naomi suggests to her boss that maybe Holly can help too. Although Rachel is reluctant, she agrees to go with Naomi's suggestion, and appoints Holly as Naomi's new assistant; shocking both Naomi and Holly. Naomi tries to make amends with Holly, by entrusting her with the very important assignment of getting Mitchell Nash from the hotel to the event. At the event, Rachel is really happy with the way Naomi has organized things, while she is waiting intently for Holly to arrive with Mitchell Nash. Holly arrives at the scene and tells them that Mitchell Nash wasn't staying at the hotel she had gone to. The boss blasts Naomi for entrusting such an important responsibility to Holly, who according to her has always been irresponsible. Holly and Naomi, haul in a completely drunk Nash to the event. He pukes on the red carpet, with the reporters having a field day. Later Holly and her mother are at it, with Holly trying to defend her position in all that transpired. Naomi again tries defending Holly in front of her mother. The whole thing proves counterproductive, with Naomi getting fired. Later, Holly thanks Naomi for all that she did for her and they both decide to become friends.

In Trust, Truth and Traffic, Naomi has embarked on her career as a freelance event planner, and she has even managed to spot her probable new client. Naomi is trying her best to convince her possible new client. She is also faced with a problem when TA, Naomi's physics class partner, informs her that she has to pass his physics class, if she wants to pass the sophomore year. It turns out the TA is hurt, as Naomi has never invited him to any of the parties she has thrown in the past year. Later on, Naomi decides to help Liam make Vanessa's party a success, so she can invite the TA to the party, and score a few brownie points. At the party, Naomi tells TA that she would rather work hard to get good marks on her project, than him favoring her in any way. In No Good Deed, Naomi decides to plan Mitchell Nash's daughters sweet sixteen birthday party, after a previous client told her she would not hire her without her having any professional experiences.

== Season 5 ==
In the fifth season opener, Max proposes to Naomi after leaving his bride-to-be standing at the altar. They elope and get married. When they return to Naomi's place to celebrate, Alec, Max's business partner tells Naomi that her and Max's relationship is a mistake. He tries multiple times to sabotage their relationship, but ultimately fails. Fed up of always fighting with Alec, Naomi asks Max to choose between her and Alec. While Max chooses her, which forces him to fire Alec from his company, their relationship becomes strained. Max and Naomi search for a replacement to Alec and when she sees the resume of Bryce Woodbridge, she tells Max to meet him as he seems to be the best candidate. However, after she discovers that Bryce is actually a woman, Naomi says she will do the job. After an unsuccessful attempt at the job, she asks Bryce to reconsider their offer. Bryce accepts the position but manages to fire Max, which was set up by Alec. He later admits to Naomi that he is in love with Max, who in the meantime has left for a gamer conference in Iceland. Naomi finds out that he had been hiding at his parents' house. The couple seeks the help of a marriage counselor. Max explains he didn't want Naomi to run his life and the counselor says that Naomi lost herself. The pair later agrees to divorce and Max decides to go back to MIT. Naomi finds her and Annie's half brother, Mark Holland (Charlie Weber), a chef who owns a gourmet food truck. After he doesn't want anything to do with her, Naomi decides to host a band and food truck contest at CU and sabotages it to let Mark win. Mark is initially upset with Naomi but agrees afterwards to open a restaurant with her after Annie talked to him.

== Reception ==
=== Acclaim ===
In its biographical page on McCord, Yahoo! states that via the role of Naomi, the actress "became one of Hollywood’s top young stars-to-watch after the series premiered to more than 5 million viewers worldwide." In a review of the series premiere, Tom Gliatto of People magazine stated that, "The standout is AnnaLynne McCord as bad-girl Naomi Clark: She’s very striking physically—almost startling, somewhere between Charlize Theron and Courtney Love—and she conveys a mix of high drama, meanness and little-girl self-pity that’s a lot of fun." Staff members of the Fort Worth Star-Telegram found McCord's performance "surprisingly more nuanced" than her previous work as Eden Lord. The article also declared that Naomi appeared to be the most complex of the younger characters early on, labeling her a "popular but vulnerable but snotty but misunderstood but vindictive high-school queen." Seventeen magazine called the character "the ultimate queen bee" in 2009. Following the completion of Season 1, McCord appeared on the premiere cover of Beauty Entertainment magazine, which made reference to Naomi's "Good Girl, Bad Girl" status.

Shortly after the premiere of Season 2, Tanner Stransky of Entertainment Weekly stated that the series "is getting better and better this season as it deliciously morphs into The AnnaLynne McCord Show". In a later EW review, Jennifer Armstrong labeled Naomi "awesome", and declared McCord "a treasure" in the role. In an autumn television recap, the magazine proclaimed the series' second season an improvement on the first, and remarked that, "Moving AnnaLynne McCord's immensely entertaining anti-heroine, Naomi, front and center certainly didn't hurt." While noting 90210's continuing focus on its younger cast in 2010, E! Online stated, "AnnaLynne McCord, we're looking at you". While discussing Jennie Garth of the original series, HollywoodLife.com proclaimed McCord "the modern-day leading lady". In the midst of Season 2, the actress was labeled "the star of 90210" by Shape magazine, also appearing on the cover.

In regards to the humorous aspects of the character, Emily Exton of Entertainment Weekly stated that McCord had "honed her comedic timing" in the second season. Jethro Nededog expressed similar acclaim in a review for the Los Angeles Times, in which he commented on a comically driven Naomi, and asked, "Is there anything better than Naomi when she knows what she wants?" Nededog also lauded Naomi's material in the second-season finale, citing the character's "movement, activity and depth."

While reviewing the third season, Andy Swift of HollywoodLife.com compared McCord to Joan Collins, stating that she "gives every scene 110 percent". Entertainment Weekly's Archana Ram wrote, "I've said it before, and I'll say it again: AnnaLynne McCord is the best part of 90210. And last night, she proved it again by giving us a glimpse of all the colors of the Naomi rainbow—bitchy, scared, confident, relieved, and more."

=== Criticism ===
"But I really don't judge my characters—I make a point not to. That's something that’s really important, I think, in taking on a character that's obviously as different as Naomi is to me in my personal life. So it's really not judging the character, age, background, etc. and just approaching it as her life. Everything she does is what she believes she must do in order to survive in the environment that she's in."

— McCord on Naomi

In addition to her popularity, Naomi has been the subject of criticism. In a review of the series premiere, Ray Richmond of The Hollywood Reporter labeled Naomi "vapid" and "prissy". Further criticism arose in the later episodes of Season 2, with reviewers citing her dishonesty and insensitivity during this period. While discussing the story in which Naomi makes false accusations of sexual harassment, Entertainment Weekly's Archana Ram likened the character to her villainous sister Jen. Jethro Nededog of the Los Angeles Times also condemned Naomi's actions, but commended her for eventually revealing the truth.

At a later point in the season, Lisa Todorovich of Zap2it criticized Naomi as being "all about herself" while failing to support Liam during a series of troubles. While acknowledging Naomi's faults, which eventually lead to a break-up with Liam, Krista Navin of MassLive.com stated that "it is totally consistent with her character that she would want to try to be there for Liam, but just be too into her own drama to really be able to be. Also, I think it makes sense that someone like Liam would think he would want to be with someone like Naomi, and then be pretty disillusioned by the reality."

=== Award recognition ===
For the role of Naomi Clark, McCord was nominated for a 2009 Teen Choice Award in the category of "Breakout Star Female". In 2010, she won a Breakthrough of the Year Award in the category of "Breakthrough Standout Performance".
