= Silver (90210) =

Erin Silver
- Beverly Hills, 90210 franchise character
- Jessica Stroup as Erin Silver
- Portrayed by: April Peterson and Arielle Peterson (1993–94); Ryanne Kastner (1994–95); Megan Lee Braley (1995–97); Mercedes Kastner (1997–2000); Jessica Stroup (2008–13)
- Duration: 1992–2000; 2008–13
- First appearance: Beverly Hills, 90210: July 22, 1992 (episode 3.02: "The Twins, the Trustee, and the Very Big Trip")
- Last appearance: 90210: May 13, 2013 (episode 5.22; "We All Fall Down")
- Created by: Darren Star
In-universe information
- Occupation: College Student (2011-2015); Personal Assistant (2011); High School Student (2007-2011)
- Parents: Mel Silver (father); Jackie Taylor (mother)
- Siblings: Kelly Taylor (half-sister); David Silver (half-brother)
- Other relatives: Sammy Taylor (nephew); Ruby Silver (niece)

Erin Silver, known mononymously as Silver, is a fictional character on The CW television series 90210, the fourth series in the Beverly Hills, 90210 franchise. Portrayed by Jessica Stroup, the character was originally introduced in Beverly Hills, 90210 as Kelly Taylor and David Silver's half-sister.

== Storylines ==
=== Season 1 ===
Silver, who is going simply by her last name, is introduced during the pilot and quickly becomes good friends with Annie Wilson, and develops a romantic interest in Annie's adopted brother Dixon Wilson, which quickly blossoms into a relationship. Before the first season, Silver warns Annie not to trust Naomi Clark, informing her that they were once best friends. Silver tells Annie that during their friendship, Silver confided in Naomi about her father's affair, but that Naomi caused it to become public knowledge; this resulted in Silver's mother relapsing. During the series, Silver celebrates her half-birthday because her mother always seems to mess up her real birthday. In "By Accident", Dixon dumps Silver after taking advice from his mother, but later in 'Help Me, Rhonda' they get back together after Silver finally admits that she is in love with him. On Valentine's Day, Dixon and Silver lose their virginity to one another. It has been clear from the start of the season that Silver has a slightly manic personality, but in "Life's a Drag", she becomes more unbalanced. She visits Dixon at the Peach Pit, where they end up having sex. Silver secretly tapes it and then shows the tape to an entire theater, causing Dixon to break up with her. She ends up breaking into Ryan Matthews's house, claiming that he destroyed her relationship with Dixon, and threatening him with a bottle of wine unless he fixes everything. Silver then attempts to run away to Kansas, stating repeatedly that going there would help her solve her problems with Dixon. At the station, a stranger notices her erratic behavior, and after she falls asleep, borrows her phone and calls someone to come get her. Dixon and his mother and father find her on the train tracks. Dixon remembers his birth mother, who had bipolar disorder, displayed the same symptoms, and realizes that Silver suffers from it also. Dixon calms Silver down and they take her to the hospital. Soon, Silver finds it unbearable to go back to West Beverly High due to the gossip surrounding her recent behavior, and decides to move to St. Claire's School. She initially tries to make a fresh start, but another girl recognizes her and wants her to be honest with the other students, going so far as doing a hunger strike until Silver sends the video to everyone. Silver then reprimands her because she's now considered a slut by everyone else. After Dixon gets a large number of students to vote for her as a write-in, Silver is awarded the West Bev "prom queen" at that year's prom, but admits that she's not prom material, which creates distance between her and Dixon. Later at Naomi's after party, whilst swimming, Dixon and Ethan end up confronting one another, which leads to Ethan Ward admitting that he likes her. Silver later runs into Ethan and asks him about his statement, she tells him that they are just friends, to which Ethan responds by kissing her and telling her that he doesn't think that they're just friends and that he doesn't want them to be just friends.

=== Season 2 ===
In season 2, Silver is seen having a good time on vacation with Adrianna and Naomi at a resort. She receives a text from Ethan, who now lives in Montana. Silver and Naomi decide to play tennis so Naomi can meet a guy named Teddy. The three finally meet when Naomi "accidentally" hits Teddy with her tennis ball. Teddy tries to flirt with both Silver and Naomi, to which Silver responds uninterestedly, intriguing Teddy. Adrianna catches up with Naomi and Silver and it results that Teddy is Teddy Montgomery, Adrianna's ex-boyfriend. Silver then takes a walk across the beach with Dixon and they share a kiss. However, Silver unknowingly drops her cellphone which is later found by Teddy. Teddy returns the cellphone to Silver but not before reading the text messages from Ethan. Teddy later shares the message from Ethan with Dixon. The text states that Ethan doesn't regret the kiss that he shared with Silver. This causes Dixon to break up with Silver because he's hurt, having found out that she kissed Ethan and texted him behind his back. Later this season, Silver finds out that her mother, Jackie, has cancer and she moves back home to help care for her. Silver begins to feel the growing pressure of her studies, private life, and taking care of her mother. Teddy later tries to talk to her and comfort her about her mom since he had the same experience himself. The two grow closer and become good friends. Just as Silver and her mother are finally catching up with each other, Jackie suffers a cardiac arrest and ends up being confined to the hospital. Silver tries talking to her sister, Kelly, to try and persuade her to forgive their dying mother but to no avail. In the next episode, however, Silver finally convinces Kelly to talk to their mother and the three finally reconcile. Sadly, Jackie dies just afterwards, and Silver becomes depressed after her mom's funeral. Teddy sends her flowers as a condolence gift because he didn't attend the funeral. Silver later approaches Teddy on the rooftop and sees him playing Tennis alone, she asks him if he's okay and he responds by saying that he has been a coward. He apologizes for not being there for her, to which Silver responds by hugging him and reassuring him that this is not true. The two share a kiss but snap out of it, agreeing to treat it as nothing but a careless move. After the kiss, Teddy seems to take his interest in Silver to a new level; He tries to get her to go with him to the Winter Wonderland Dance but is turned down. In a second attempt to win her over, Teddy makes a video of himself saying that he quits his playboy days and only wants to date Silver; the video is broadcast to the whole school. Teddy again asks Silver to go out with him, but is turned down. However, Teddy eventually gets her to dance with him as friends, but suddenly surprises her with a kiss. Silver is shocked by this sudden advance and goes back to Naomi. Naomi gives Silver advice and tells her to take a chance with Teddy as he seems to be really into her. Silver listens to her friend and decides to give it a try, but later sees Teddy with another girl, not knowing it's his sister, Silver thinks Teddy has returned to his playboy ways. Dixon later approaches Silver and she asks him about the girl, since Dixon was with Teddy earlier that night. Dixon deliberately lies, leaving Silver to believe that Teddy still behaves like a playboy. Silver feels vulnerable and allows Dixon to kiss her, but this is witnessed by Teddy. After a short vacation, Dixon approaches Silver and asks if she will get back together with him. However, Silver rejects him gently and tells him that she just doesn't feel that way about him anymore but that she wants him to stay in her life as friends. Dixon agrees and they hangout together, as they have lunch Teddy's sister approaches them and tells Silver that she made the wrong decision by not giving Teddy a chance. By approaching Silver, Teddy's sister subsequently reveals that Dixon knew all along who she was. This causes a strain in Silver and Dixon's friendship. Finally, After much persuasion and misunderstandings, Teddy and Silver finally get together as a couple. Unfortunately, Teddy's father goes to see Silver and bribes her to break up with him because he feels Teddy's tennis career is suffering due to their relationship. Silver refuses to take the bribe, but starts thinking about what his father said. After thinking it through thoroughly, Silver decides that it is in Teddy's best interests for them to break up. In the season finale, Silver tells him she is sorry and that she loves him, resulting in their reconciliation.

=== Season 3 ===
In season 3, Teddy and Silver break up due to his drinking habits, this hits Silver particularly hard because of her late mother's history of alcoholism. After their break up, Silver begins to focus on the West Beverly Blaze, which starts Mr. Cannon's interest in Silver. Silver is almost drugged by Cannon when she stops by his house to watch a documentary, but she leaves after noticing that Naomi had said exactly the same phrase that was said by Cannon in the video. Due to her work in the Blaze, Silver develops a close bond with Navid Shirazi and helps him with his problems regarding his father. Silver even goes undercover as a porn star in order to help Navid investigate. As she gets to know Navid, she realizes what a great guy he is and slowly starts to develop more romantic feelings for him, this is particularly encouraged by his recent relationship problems with Adrianna. Silver and Navid almost kiss and they begin to accept that there is something more between them. In 'The Best L'eid Plans', it becomes apparent that Silver's feelings for Navid have grown stronger, when they spend the night in her room talking about his father. When Navid and his current girlfriend, Adrianna, have an argument, Silver seems relieved to hear it and hesitates but agrees when Adrianna asks her for help to fix Adrianna's and Navid's relationship by helping her plan something special. As Silver takes Navid away from the party, he confesses that he has feelings for her, but the moment is interrupted by Adrianna and Silver is left disappointed. In the episode Holiday Madness, when Navid confronts her in school, before he has a chance to explain what he feels and how he has no feelings for Adrianna anymore, she stops him from saying too much and tells him that it is because they have been spending too much time together and so they should keep their distance. Everything seems to be going well until Silver attends the sleepover at Adrianna's new house but only Silver and Navid are able to attend. The tension becomes apparent when Silver, Navid and Adrianna are to spend one night together. As Adrianna sleeps, Silver and Navid are unable to and so they run into each other in the hallway. There, Navid brings up the feelings he has for Silver again and he asks her if what he feels is all in his head. Silver says 'yes' but does not look him the eyes, making it obvious that she does not believe that. As Navid steps closer to her and asks her if she doesn't feel anything for him, the moment is interrupted by Adrianna, again. Later on at Adrianna's Christmas party, Silver finds Navid alone and as he apologizes for ruining their friendship for feelings that he "thinks" he has for her, Silver finally admits that she does have feelings for him and he kisses her. Silver gets a text message from Naomi and decided to rescue her at her own apartment. Mr Cannon then holds Silver and Naomi hostage, but they eventually tie him to the chair. Naomi slaps Mr. Cannon and nearly kills him with his knife that he threatened to kill her with. But Naomi breaks down with Silver. They call the police and Mr. Cannon is arrested. Later on, Adrianna finds out about Silver and Navid. When Adrianna pretends to think it was one of Navid's ex-girlfriends, she tells Silver she is going to send a nude picture of her to the entire school. Silver stops her and comes clean that she is the one Navid was cheating with and that they are in a relationship. Adrianna then tells her she knows, and she texts a nude picture of Silver to the entire school. Silver and Adrianna go back and forth playing mean pranks before they appear to reconcile, but Adrianna switches Silver's medication for bipolar disorder. She then begins to behave strangely: she dyes her hair in red, she calls Christopher several times, the man who she had an interview with for NYU in the afternoon, etc. After receiving some distressing news about NYU, Silver has an emotional breakdown, causing Navid and Dixon to stage an intervention to make her go to a mental hospital. While Silver is in the hospital, Adrianna takes the opportunity to get close to Navid by getting him drunk and telling him that they kissed. When Navid continues to reject her, Adrianna tells Silver that Navid kissed her, effectively breaking them up. Fortunately, Silver finally discovers the truth during Ivy's bachelorette party when her medication falls out of Adrianna's purse. Adrianna is rejected by the group and Navid and Silver reconcile.

=== Season 4 ===
In the season four opener, Silver is still mad with Adrianna and takes it out on Navid and his sister, Leila. Whilst at Naomi's party, Adrianna shows up with Leila and tries to apologize to Silver, but she told her that she would never forgive her. Silver revealed she was almost going to kill herself, due to Adrianna messing with her medication. Later, Silver finds Teddy at the party and gives him advice on how to tell his family that he is gay.

In "Rush Hour", when Navid's sister was missing, Silver told Navid to stay calm, that eventually she will come back. She used to do this when she lived with her alcoholic mother, Jackie. Silver got mad when Navid talks to Adrianna for help but she ends up asking her for help too after Leila called revealing that she has been kidnapped and they need to pay $50,000 if they wanted her back. At the end Leila is found and the kidnapped story was fake by her and a tattoo guy she met. In Let the Games Begin, Silver wanted to gain experience for her film career and decided to shoot a commercial for Liam's bar, which resulted in a big hit when a lot of people showed to attend the bar opening. In Party Politics, Silver has the opportunity to create campaign videos for political candidate Marissa Harris-Young, who is running for public office against Teddy's uncle Charles. Navid confides in Silver about his uncle blackmailing him and refuses to let her help him out. Later on that night, she tells him she needs some space and stays with Naomi.

Silver asks Annie to babysit Lelia so she can have time alone with Navid. Silver has the opportunity to create campaign videos for political candidate Marissa Harris-Young, who is running for public office against Teddy's uncle Charles. Navid confides in Silver about his uncle blackmailing him and refuses to let her help him out. During her work with Marissa, Navid sends her a text asking her to be at Leila's birthday party, Marissa starts noticing Silver is distracted and tries to help her. When Naomi makes a fundraising event for Raj, Silver helps by being the host and Navid shows up again telling her that he is done with his uncle and Silver supports him until Navid leaves without telling her. She starts feeling that she cannot trust him again. While working on the Marissa campaign she talks to a woman who appears in one of Marissa video where she help people and the woman tells her that she is an actress and was paid to say that.

A few weeks later, Naomi invites everyone to Vegas but Silver has some troubles due to her job with Marissa. She later sees Navid kissing another woman. Silver films Teddy's wedding with her camera, and the next day when they were leaving Marissa calls Silver asking her about some videos she needs but Silver sends her Teddy's wedding by mistake along with the work videos. Silver later finds out that the video has been leaked and Teddy immediately blames Shane. Silver realizes she accidentally sent the video to Marrissa and that Marrissa is the one who leaked the video to gain votes.

In "Smoked Turkey" Silver is with Naomi and Annie, they are buying a drink because of the hot weather. Silver says she has no interest in getting back together with Navid. Silver meets a man named Greg Davis when he asks her for a flier for a food drive at college. Greg is a teacher at CU. At Naomi's house, Silver is in the kitchen with Annie, she hears the ringtone Annie had previously set for Patrick. Silver asks Annie "Is that Patrick's ringtone?" Annie denies this. Annie tells Silver to stop worrying about her because she and Patrick are no longer together. Silver then leaves to go to the food drive. At Student union, Greg approaches Silver again, they talk to each other about the food drive. Silver asks Greg if he would like to go with her friend Annie on date at Naomi's house. Greg accepts Silver's kind invitation. At Naomi's house, Silver introduces Annie and Greg, hoping to set them up, when Annie becomes reluctant. Silver apologizes and hopes she is not overstepping but she want Annie to have a nice man in her life because she deserves it. Annie says thanks but Greg is clearly here for Silver. Ivy assumes Greg is Silver's date. When the police evacuate the house due to the brush fire accidentally started by Naomi. Silver kisses Greg when he says he will be going home and that he will call her for a next date.

In "Project Runaway" Silver is at Naomi's house with Ivy and Annie, they are watching a movie when Naomi comes in to say to Silver that Teddy will forgive her. When Silver arrives Liam's Bar, she hear guys say something to pick on Teddy about gay. She comes to Teddy and tells him that she is very sorry about this. Teddy tells her that he will get a job in London which surprises Silver. When Navid got the window stuck, he asks Silver to close the window because she lived there before. When Silver arrives there, she attempts close the window but it still stuck and Navid tries to help. It closes abruptly which causes Silver to fall onto the bed with Navid. gets angry at Navid and tells him that she is moving on and dating someone else. At the fashion show, Silver is there with Shane, showing her support to Naomi, and she spots a friend named Ronnie. When Navid sees Silver with Ronnie, he thinks Silver is dating him but later finds out Ronnie is gay. Silver sees Navid talk with Ronnie then she then proceeds to yell at Navid for not moving on. Teddy apologises to Silver for avoiding her and giving her the silent treatment with a flower. Silver picks Teddy up so he may leave Washington D.C. to be with Shane. Silver and Teddy say goodbye to each other and when Teddy is leaving, Silver stands there and waves them farewell.

In "O Holly Night", Silver learns that Greg has a wife, but is currently divorcing her. Late on in the episode, Silver goes to visit Navid in Hospital after he got beat up. Just as she's about to go in, she overhears Navid confessing his feelings for Kat. Silver leaves right away, and ends up in the arms of her Greg. However, Silver didn't stay around long enough to hear Navid say he cares about Silver more than Kat. In Should Old Acquaintance Be Forgot?, Greg introduces Silver to his daughter Maisey as they start to get serious.But, Silver is shocked when she finds out Maisey is Adrianna's biological daughter. In "Mama Can You Hear Me?", Greg is offered a teaching gig at Columbia University and wants Silver to move with him. Navid confides in Adrianna that he and Silver will never be together, and Adrianna encourages him to at least try to save their friendship. Over at Silver and Greg's, Navid overhears Greg on the phone about his daughter and he realizes that he adopted Adrianna's baby. He encourages Silver to tell Adrianna, but she refuses. In "Trust, Truth and Traffic", Adrianna is not happy with Silver, Greg, and Maisy's relationship so she kidnaps Maisey from the daycare center. Silver and Navid team up together to try to find her. They later find her in a park with Maisey. Greg comes along and tells Silver that she had no right to introduce Maisey to her birth mother and breaks up with her on the spot. In "No Good Deed", Navid decides to attend Princeton University and everyone has a party for him. Silver finally realizes that she loves Navid but does not tell him.

In "Babes In Toyland", Silver gets accepted into New York University and hopes she will be close to Navid in nearby Princeton, but she later has second thoughts. In Blood Is Thicker Than Mud, Silver, working as a production assistant on the set of Liam's latest movie, confides in him about her fears of having an inherited cancer gene. In The Heart Will Go On, Liam finds himself accompanying Silver to a clinic at the hospital to support her during a test to detect if she has the breast cancer gene, while Vanessa becomes increasingly jealous over the time Liam is spending with Silver and his refusal to explain why. In Blue Ivy, Silver and Liam have sex after she knows her test results are positive for the cancer gene. In Bride and Prejudice, Silver wakes up in Liam's bed from when she ran into his arms after her breast cancer gene diagnosis. Liam admits his feelings for Silver, but she wants to forget the whole night happened. Then, in a string of odd interactions, Silver all of a sudden decides she wants to rekindle things with Navid and seems to go out of her way to express her feelings to Navid right in front of Liam. It's clear that she has feelings for Liam. But in the end, Navid is committed to staying with Silver while Liam won't let Silver get away that easily— he kisses her, again. In Tis Pity, Silver is still determined to make a relationship with Navid work out. Navid is now Silver's doting boyfriend and support system again, so he goes with Silver to her first mammogram after learning she has the breast cancer gene. At this appointment, Silver realizes she may be pregnant. Since Navid knows this possible baby could not be his, he wisely names himself “most likely to raise a stranger’s baby” considering his track record with Ade back in high school and now this situation. Navid also lets the possibility slip to Liam, since they are bros and Navid has no clue Liam is the potential baby-daddy. Of course the confusion and emotions spiral out of control very quickly at Liam's movie premiere. With cameras flashing, the boys come to blows when Navid puts two and two together. Even though Silver learns she is not in fact pregnant, the cat is out of the bag. In A Tale of Two Parties, Silver goes to her doctor for an appointment, and the doctor tells her she has a lot of choices. One of them is deciding to have her ovaries removed after she has kids, raising the risk for her to have ovarian cancer. Later on, Silver thinks about wanting to have a baby. While at the Max's brides bachelorette party, Silver asks Adrianna what it was like being pregnant. Ade tells her it was the most amazing experience of her life. Silver tells her about the missing feeling she had after she found out her pregnancy was a false alarm. Silver decides she wants a baby and asks Liam & Navid if either of them wants to raise one with her. In the season finale, Forever Hold Your Peace, Silver has vehemently decided that she wants to get pregnant sooner rather than later to ensure that she can have a child before preventative cancer treatments. She wants a friend who she can always count on to be in her life and be the father of her child. She picks her best friend Teddy.

=== Season 5 ===
In the fifth season opener, Silver tells Teddy that she doesn't want to have a baby with a stranger, and isn't ready to commit to Navid or Liam either. Teddy tells her he isn't ready to be a parent. He understands how important it is to her, but he needs to think about it. Later on, Teddy tells Liam and Navid how Silver wants to have a baby with him. Both of them are outraged to hear this. Silver tells all three of them that she isn't able to make a decision about either of them, as she isn't sure what to do. At the end of the episode, Teddy finally makes his decision about having a baby with Silver, accepting her offer making Silver overjoyed. In The Sea Change, Silver and Teddy visit the sperm bank so Teddy can donate his sperm. Silver tells him she'll do her part when she's ovulating. Teddy mentions that he has to go back to D.C. tomorrow. They also talk about Navid & Liam, and if either of them would ever get back with Silver. Later on, Silver goes to see Liam that night and asks him if he wants to go to Naomi's reception together, and he tells her he's going with Vanessa. Later, Silver mentions to Teddy that she's ovulating that day but she has to wait until next month because of the reception. At the reception, Navid introduces his two porn star dates to Silver. The dates are part of his mission to change his “nice guy” image. Silver heads down to the cellar to drink her feelings and Teddy comes down to join her. While they're down there, Silver almost kisses Teddy. It reminds them that they never talked about Teddy's feelings for her when he was “straight”. Thinking that Teddy never really loved her, Silver leaves. Later, Silver asks him if he ever loved her or if it was a lie. Teddy tells her he was never lying to her, he was lying to himself, and he still loves her.

In It's All Fun and Games, Annie, Naomi and Adrianna throw a baby shower for Silver. Silver arrives and reveals to her friends that she is worried about having a baby at her age. She basically isn't sure if she is responsible enough to be a mother yet. Adrianna suggests that Silver and she should have “crazy Silver fun” for the next 24 hours, and after that maybe the thought of having a kid wouldn't be so scary. Just then a male stripper, who Naomi has invited for the party comes in and begins doing his stuff. Silver and Adrianna have a fun day together. Silver though, isn't apparently having too much fun, as being irresponsible isn't making her feel ready to be a mother. Adrianna then suggests that they do something which will help Silver face her fears, and Silver reluctantly agrees. Silver swings on a trapeze, in order to overcome her fears, and apparently seems to have enjoyed every moment of it. “I kicked fear’s ass” Silver tells Adrianna with absolute joy. Later on, Silver tells Adrianna that she has made an appointment at the fertility clinic, for the morning. Adrianna tells Silver all she had to do was overcome her fear and trapeze seems to have totally worked. Silver admits she is still scared, but it would be scarier for her to not live her life, she feels. At the end, she is seen getting a naked photo shoot with which she could immortalize her pre-baby, pre-surgery body.

In "902-100", Silver and Teddy have a dispute over the baby. Silver wants to completely erase Teddy out of the picture, but rightfully believes that's unfair. A couple episodes later, when Teddy refuses to sign a form forfeiting all his parental rights, Silver goes to Teddy's uncle who threatens to have the embryos frozen or destroyed. Furious with Silver, Teddy again refuses to sign over his parental rights but Silver forges his signature. Teddy then brings in Shane's sister, Michaela (Lyndon Smith) from Washington, D. C. She agrees to become Silver's surrogate. When Dixon discovers Michaela has an incredible singing voice he wants to sign her to his record label. But Silver doesn't think that's a good idea as she feels Michaela should not be doing anything strenuous. Meanwhile, Silver attempts to reconcile her friendship with Adrianna. As they do, Annie and Naomi's half-brother Mark (Charlie Weber) arrives in LA and Silver and Ade make a pact to not let a guy come in between them. But then Silver finally confesses to Ade that she slept with Mark. Adrianna at first pretends she's okay with it but when Silver leaves, she shows her anger. She accuses Silver of not having changed since high school and tells her she doesn't want to be her friend anymore.

Michaela wants to go on tour but because she's pregnant with Silver's baby, Silver says no. Michaela feels Silver is becoming too bossy, demanding and overbearing. Feeling bad for Michaela, Adrianna leaks a demo she recorded. Shortly afterwards, Michaela goes missing. Silver immediately blames Dixon who denies leaking the demo. Eventually, they discover Adrianna did it. Dixon accuses Adrianna of stealing Michaela's song like she stole Javier's songs. An infuriated Silver then accuses Adrianna of being "the same conniving, manipulative, backstabbing bitch she was in high school". Afterwards, Silver goes to find Michaela on her own. Dixon calls Teddy, which Silver is against because they had been fighting for the last few months. Eventually, they find Michaela at a bar having a drink. Michaela is distraught and crying. She tells Silver that she suffered a miscarriage. She also tells Silver that Adrianna didn't steal her song, she wrote it. Because she's so devastated, Michaela decides to go back to Washington and asks Dixon to let Adrianna take her place at a Spencer Blaine Tribute concert, to which Ade agrees. But after finishing the song, the stage collapses and catches on fire leaving Ade trapped under the rubble. When Silver arrives on the scene, she begins to regret calling Ade a "hateful bitch", fearing that could've been the last thing she ever said to her. But then Adrianna (still trapped under the rubble) calls Silver and expresses her condolences to her having heard about Michaela's miscarriage. After that, Silver gets a call from her doctor who tells her she has cancer. She breaks down and cries in front of Dixon and tells him. Dixon gives Silver a pep talk telling her to fight until she can't fight anymore and then her friends will be there to carry her up.

== Development ==
The character of Silver was introduced in the second season of Beverly Hills, 90210 as the newborn daughter of Mel Silver and Jackie Taylor, and the half-sister of Kelly Taylor and David Silver. She is re-introduced as a 15-year-old in the spin-off. She displayed some classic bipolar symptoms, including erratic, reckless behavior, racing speech, grandiose ideas, hypersexuality, lack of sleep, euphoria and confusion. As often happens during manic phases, Silver ended up making destructive decision, which ended with her at the train station, rambling and bewildered, running toward a speeding train. It was confirmed in the following episode as she was diagnosed with the disorder. Silver's bipolar disorder was revisited after Adrianna tampers with her medication when implementing her plot for revenge.

=== Appearance and style ===
In Season 1, Silver is shown to have long black hair and dazzling blue eyes. She has a chilled, laid-back personality and seems to show disdain towards proms and school dances. She seemed to have her own sense of style, as she is usually seen wearing clothes probably would not be worn by a typical Beverly Hills girl. In Season 2, her hair was cut short and her sense of fashion has become more girly due to Naomi and Adrianna's influence but still remains her original style. Also, her interest in school dances seemed to have grown since she was seen going to the Snowflake Dance in "Winter Wonderland and the Pass the Torch Dance in "Confessions." In Season 3, Silver's hair was styled like a tomboy's cut and dyed chocolate brown. For a short time in Season 3, while she was having another episode with her bipolar disorder, she dyed her hair an intense orange color in order to give it more "pizazz." Eventually, she recolored it brown after returning from the psych ward. In Season 4, Silver's hair had grown into a style such as her former one in Season 2 but with blonde highlights. By the fifth season, her hair resembles her former self in Season 1, with her hair now below her shoulders.

== Reception ==
=== Critical reception ===
Reception towards Silver as a character was mainly mixed, with critics praising her uniqueness. Stroup received positive reviews for her performance, especially for her performance throughout season 1 with Silver dealing with her illness, which was critically lauded.

=== Award recognition ===
In 2010, Stroup won a Young Hollywood Award in the category of "Sparkling Performance" for her portrayal of Silver. In 2012, Stroup was nominated for two PRISM Award's for Silver's Mental Health storyline and Female Performance in a Drama Series Multi-Episode Storyline.
