= Kelly Taylor =

Fictional character in Beverley Hills, 90210

- Beverly Hills, 90210 franchise character
- Kelly, portrayed by Jennie Garth, matures from adolescence to adulthood.
- Portrayed by: Jennie Garth
- Duration: 1990–2000; 2008–10; 2019
- First appearance: "Class of Beverly Hills" (1990; Beverly Hills, 90210
- Last appearance: "Rats and Heroes" (2010; 90210)
- Created by: Darren Star
In-universe information
- Occupation: Owned "Kelly Taylor Public Relations"; Partner in a clothing store Volunteer at an AIDS hospice Manager of a free clinic Guidance Counselor (spin-off)
- Parents: Jackie Taylor (deceased on spin-off); Bill Taylor; Mel Silver (step-father)
- Siblings: Joy Taylor (paternal half-sister); Erin Silver (maternal half-sister); David Silver (step-brother)
- Children: Unnamed Child (with Brandon Walsh; miscarried); Sammy (son, with Dylan McKay)

Kelly Marlene Taylor, portrayed by Jennie Garth, is the lead female character of Beverly Hills, 90210 for the majority of the show's duration. Initially presented as a "spoiled teen vixen", the role was gradually expanded by producers. Subsequently, Kelly became instrumental in launching the first spin-off, was written with a more compassionate demeanor, overcame several perils and personal challenges, and attracted many romantic suitors and triangles. Appearing for the entirety of the series' run, the character is noted for her development from youth to adulthood.

Kelly appears prominently in a majority of the shows that compose the Beverly Hills, 90210 franchise. In addition to her role in launching the spin-off, Melrose Place, Garth was the first performer from the original show to be cast in the third spin-off, 90210. Having appeared in the most series premieres, as well as the most episodes of any figure throughout the continuity, she is the de facto central character of the Beverly Hills, 90210 franchise.

Garth's portrayal has earned recognition from critics and co-stars. In a 1995 article on the actress, TV Guide's Mary Murphy stated that, "Her signature role—the sensitive, seductive, and tortured Kelly Taylor—tapped into the very essence of teenage angst and brought her a huge cult following." Actors Jason Priestley, Grant Show, and Sara Foster have expressed admiration for Garth's work. In a 2009 article, Nellie Andreeva of The Hollywood Reporter called the character of Kelly "organic to 90210's setting."

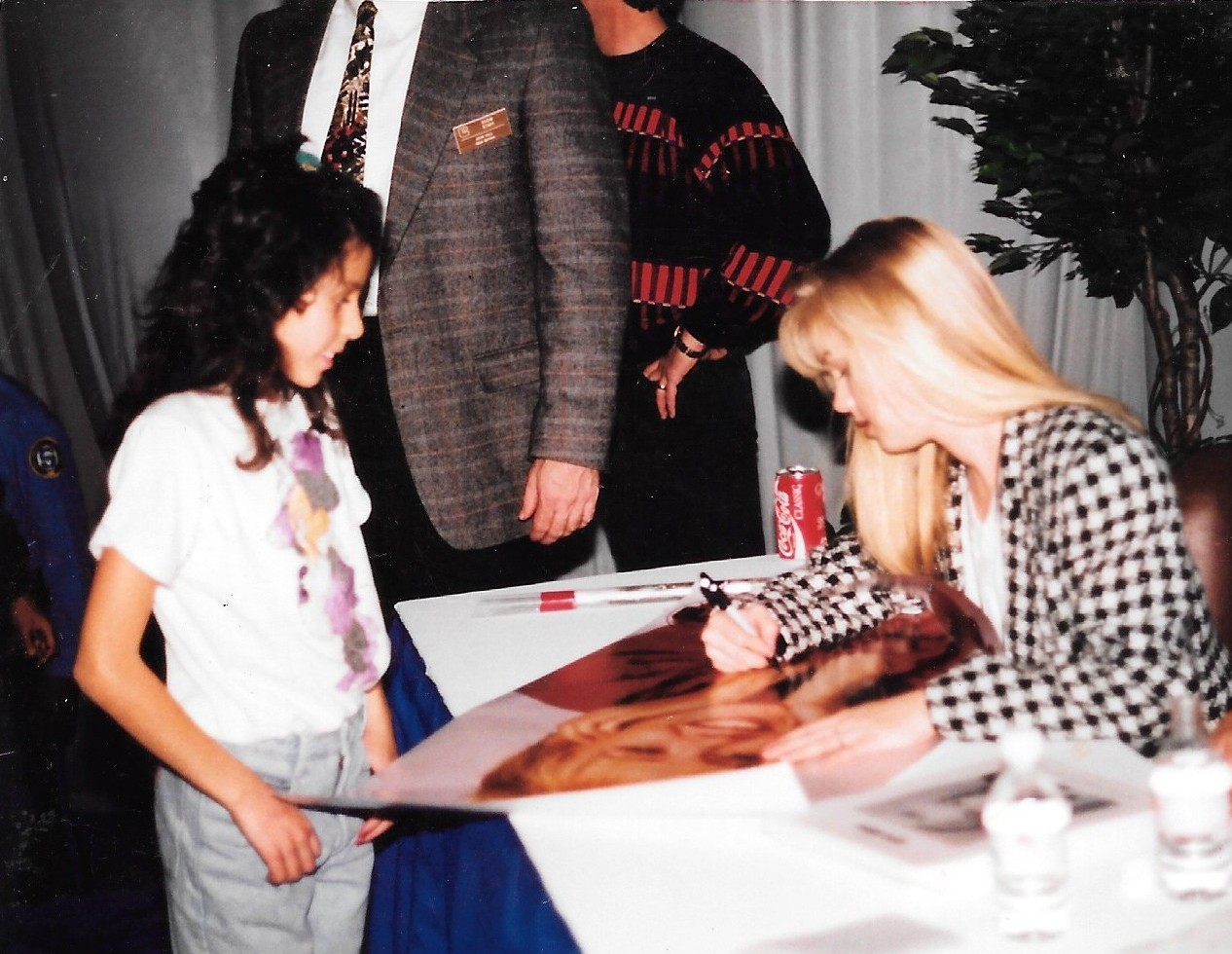
Jennie Garth signing a poster of Kelly for a young fan at a mall in New Jersey

== Beverly Hills, 90210 ==
=== Introduction ===
Throughout the course of the first series, Kelly became one of the show's most developed characters. When introduced in 1990, she was presented as, on the surface, a stereotypical spoiled type who placed high value on a posh appearance and material possessions. However, the character would become increasingly layered as the series progressed.

The reasons for Kelly's behavior first started to reveal themselves in episode 7, "Perfect Mom", when Kelly was forced to confront her mother's drug addiction and alcoholism. Several of her friends, particularly the Walsh family and Andrea Zuckerman, first came to appreciate Kelly's difficulties in life when they saw her handle this problem. During episode 13, "Slumber Party," Kelly revealed that she was taken advantage of by a senior during her freshmen year in high school, which had led to a promiscuous lifestyle and reputation which deeply hurt her self-esteem. The others then began to realize that Kelly had been through more difficulties than they were aware of, and later, she and Andrea would become close friends. When Andrea was pregnant and was contemplating an abortion in season 4, Kelly was one of the primary people she reached out to.

=== Progression ===
Toward the end of the second season, Kelly met a man named Jake Hanson (played by Grant Show), an emotionally guarded biker who was slightly older than her. While Jake ultimately resisted their romance, citing Kelly's age, he admitted to admiring her for her heart and kindness. This story line was used to launch the spin-off series Melrose Place. Eventually, Kelly was revealed to have a notable conscience during a summer fling with Dylan McKay, the boyfriend of her friend Brenda, often being the voice of reason during their affair. Kelly went through a period of minor depression during her senior year in high school in season 3. The stress caused from her love for Dylan, someone who she could not be with because of his relationship with Brenda, added to her struggles. Even when Kelly dated Dylan out in the open, following his relationship with Brenda, it caused her to temporarily lose Brenda as a friend.

Also during this time, Kelly's mother had a new baby, Erin, got married, and put Kelly's childhood home up for sale. Self-consciousness over her figure, along with the anxiety she began to feel, caused her to lash out emotionally, abuse diet pills, and briefly lose control over her life. The character's physical appearance is shown to play a part in her development. At various points of the series, she won the title of Spring Princess at a dance and was voted her school's most beautiful girl. Kelly is aware of her appeal, but not to the point of conceit; instead, she is sometimes shown to be troubled by it. At one point, she entered a phase in which she felt that no one took her seriously, which was heightened when Dylan gave his manuscript to Andrea for review instead of to her. During this time, she began to feel that people only liked her because she was physically attractive.

Creator Darren Star has commented on the character's progression. In his DVD commentary of the episode "Spring Dance", Star notes Kelly's first attempt to romance Brandon Walsh, in which she'd embraced her role as Spring Princess and used a largely forward and aggressive approach. He goes on to state that in the fourth season, when Kelly was prone to expressing her affections in a more gentle and compassionate manner, she made a greater impression on Brandon. While pursuing Jake on Melrose Place, a confused Kelly eventually asks, "Don't you think I'm pretty?" This contrasts with her attitude one year later, when she becomes more interested in having others appreciate her for what lies beneath the surface. This development is standardized one additional year later, via her aforementioned second pursuit of Brandon Walsh, which ends in success.

=== Rise in prominence ===
The evolution of Kelly's character led to developments both on-screen and off. In a 1995 article on Garth, TV Guide reported that the show's creators made a conscious decision to place her character at center stage. An anonymous producer cites "faith in Jennie as an actress," further stating that he and producer Aaron Spelling "knew she had the chops to do it." This development would gradually lead to Kelly supplanting Brenda as the prominent female lead, as the former received what the producer called "better story lines." Reportedly, these matters became a source of tension between Garth and Shannen Doherty, who played Brenda. Following Doherty's final appearance on the show in 1994, however, Garth stated, "We were friends at work, and I miss her most of the time."

The approach of season 3 marked the beginning of Kelly's rise from supporting player to the main character.

Ultimately, throughout the first five seasons, Kelly gained an increasing degree of screen presence and growth. Amidst her continuing development, her role in launching the spin-off, her prominent triangle with Brenda and Dylan, her later affections with male lead Brandon, and the launch of a second triangle with Brandon and Dylan, Kelly became the character that several major events or changes were based around. Additionally, she was given varying involvement in noted story lines not surrounding her—including Dylan's family trauma, Brenda's acting pursuits, and David's recovery from drug use. Her status would become standardized throughout the course of the series' run.

In addition to Melrose Place, she would later be used to help launch the third spin-off, 90210 (with Garth being the first performer from the original show to be cast). This development would make Kelly Taylor the most prominent figure in the collective franchise, via the most appearances in episodes and series premieres. Shannen Doherty, who returned as Brenda in the third spin-off, reported that she and Garth, like their characters, had renewed their friendship, stating, "Now we’re really good friends—and I love her."

=== Adulthood ===
Kelly faced several difficult issues and obstacles, often with the assistance of loved ones, including her occasionally difficult home life, her alcoholic mother and absent father. She also was trapped in a fire and burned, tricked into joining a cult, and became addicted to cocaine and going to rehab. In addition, she was stalked by a girl from rehab and who tried to kill her in a double suicide, she was shot in a drive by after which she endured getting amnesia, she was raped then shot her rapist in self-defense, becoming unexpectedly pregnant and having a miscarriage, and learning that it would be difficult for her to have children because of a condition called endometriosis. In overcoming these matters, she was able to become a better person and help others.

Tori Spelling's Donna Martin and Kathleen Robertson's Clare Arnold were among Kelly's best friends and roommates. Tiffani Thiessen's Valerie Malone, who replaced Brenda, became Kelly's nemesis, but right before Valerie's departure, the two women formed a truce.

Kelly's two most prominent romantic relationships were with Jason Priestley's Brandon and Luke Perry's Dylan. In season 5, she was faced with making a choice between the two, as a result of Brandon proposing and Dylan confessing his feelings for her and asking her to leave with him on a trip around the world. She declined to choose between the two men at that time, instead stating, "I choose me," but also affirming her love for both of them. In the seventh season, however, she finally stated that she had chosen Brandon. She nearly married Brandon, but the two decided that they were not ready. Following Jason Priestley's departure from the series, Jennie Garth became the officially billed lead, with the character of Kelly further maturing, reuniting romantically with Dylan, and starting her own PR firm.

== Melrose Place ==
For the launch of the series Melrose Place in 1992, Jennie Garth made a multi-episode special guest appearance. During the final episodes of Beverly Hills, 90210 season 2, Grant Show played his Melrose Place character Jake, who started a relationship with Kelly which led into early episodes of the spin-off. During Kelly's appearances, her relationship with Jake was largely on-and-off due to his discomfort with her youth. In the end, after weeks of trying to break up with Kelly, Jake pretended to cheat on her, prompting her to leave him. Afterward on both Beverly Hills, 90210 and Melrose Place, Kelly, Donna, Jake, and others made occasional comments concerning Kelly and Jake's brief relationship.

== 90210 ==
In 2008, Kelly Taylor returned in the spin-off 90210, now working as a guidance counselor at her alma mater West Beverly Hills High School. It was revealed that in the intervening years, she attained a master's degree and had a son named Sammy with Dylan. She and Dylan ended their relationship soon after. It was also revealed that West Beverly principal Harry Wilson was Kelly's neighbor growing up.

Kelly's tenuous relationship with her mother Jackie (Ann Gillespie) continued in the series' first season, with tension arising due to Jackie's drunken negligence of Erin, a recurring character in the original series and a regular in the spin-off. She also resumed her friendship with Brenda Walsh. However, their relationship was briefly strained by Kelly's and possibly Brenda's lingering feelings for former boyfriend Dylan McKay, as well as Brenda sleeping with Kelly's ex-boyfriend, Ryan Matthews, a teacher at West Beverly. Following Brenda's discovery that she could not have children, she and Kelly made amends once again.

On the night of Donna's moving-back party, Kelly and Ryan met at a convenience store. She was told by a fortune teller that she would meet a man with a six-pack. In his hands, Ryan was holding a six-pack of beer. Kelly and Ryan then went to his apartment, where they were last seen making out. Ultimately, she and Ryan chose not to pursue a romantic relationship.

In the second season, Kelly began to spend more time with Harry, much to the chagrin of his wife Debbie. It was implied that both Kelly and Harry had begun to develop feelings for each other. However, Garth refused to participate in a proposed story line involving an affair. Upon learning that Jackie was dying of cancer, Kelly was initially distant from her mother and protective of Erin (who is commonly called by her surname Silver), eventually causing Silver to move out and live with Jackie. The day after Silver's "half-birthday," Jackie was admitted to the hospital. After talking to Silver, Kelly gained the strength to visit their mother. Eventually, Kelly and Jackie made amends before Jackie's untimely death. Garth departed the series following season 2, later citing problems with the newly appointed show-runner, Rebecca Sinclair, and the direction the show took. Although not written out after her last appearance, she was mentioned several times later in the show, indicating that she was still around looking after her sister, just not on screen.

== Reception ==
The character Naomi Clark (AnnaLynne McCord, left), of 90210, has been compared to Kelly Taylor.

With regard to Garth's long-running portrayal, Nellie Andreeva of The Hollywood Reporter acknowledged the character of Kelly as being "organic to 90210's setting,” in a 2009 article. On November 24, 2008, SOAPnet aired a Beverly Hills, 90210 marathon titled "Kelly's Leftovers,” dedicated to the character's love life. While discussing the Melrose Place spin-off in a 2009 interview, Grant Show, who played Jake Hanson in the original, communicated that he would be open to appearing, if Jennie Garth did so as Kelly Taylor. After being confirmed to direct a season one episode of the spin-off, 90210, Jason Priestley commented that he hoped Jennie Garth would be among the actors present. Sara Foster, who was cast as Jen Clark in the spin-off, has stated that she was excited and nervous about meeting Garth, who she'd watched in the original series.

In its biographical article on the actress, Yahoo! states that "playing the popular tramp-turned-good girl Kelly through the years afforded Garth the opportunity to not only grow up on camera in front of America, but to fully develop her character and improve her acting chops each season." Additionally, Kelly Taylor has been cited by the media as an inspiration for the character Naomi Clark (AnnaLynne McCord), introduced in 90210. On September 2, 2010 (9/02/10), Reuters.com featured an article on the original series, quoting a Twitter message in which Garth stated, "Love to the original cast and crew. And the new kids too."
