= Lonelyhearts (Grimm) =

- Grimm episode
- Episode no.: Season 1 Episode 4
- Directed by: Michael Waxman
- Written by: Alan DiFiore; Dan E. Fesman
- Cinematography by: Cort Fey
- Editing by: Chris Willingham
- Production code: 104
- Original air date: November 18, 2011
- Running time: 43 minutes

Guest appearances
- Patrick Fischler as Billy Capra; Sharon Sachs as Dr. Harper; Henri Lubatti as Reaper

Episode chronology
← Previous "Beeware"	Next → "Danse Macabre"
- Grimm season 1

"Lonelyhearts" is the 4th episode of the supernatural drama television series Grimm of season 1, which premiered on November 18, 2011, on NBC. The episode was written by supervising producer Alan DiFiore and co-executive producer Dan E. Fesman, and was directed by Michael Waxman.

== Plot ==
Opening quote: "There she paused for a while thinking... but the temptation was so great that she could not conquer it."

A young woman, Faith Collins, is running along a road, tormented by visions, and is hit by a motorist. The driver, Leroy Kent, calls an ambulance while a mysterious man arrives and suffocates her to death before disappearing. Nick (David Giuntoli) and Hank (Russell Hornsby) are called to investigate and find glass cuts in her arms. They interrogate her husband, Roy, as he has been reported for domestic abuse, but he doesn't reveal anything.

Following up on a social media post she made, Nick and Hank arrive at a bed and breakfast and question the owner, Billy Capra (Patrick Fischler). He says that Faith appeared at the B&B but didn't stay. He shows them the garden, where Nick sees Capra shift into creature form. Nick and Monroe (Silas Weir Mitchell) later identify him as a Ziegevolk, whose pheromones make women fall in love with him. Nick and Hank discover that other women have gone missing since Capra arrived in Portland, some of them later turning up pregnant. Capra is shown feeding three women caged up in his basement.

Nick tells Monroe to follow Capra to a bar while Hank sneaks into the B&B. Hank discovers the caged women but stumbles into a booby trap and is incapacitated. Nick arrives shortly after Capra leaves the bar. He finds Hank, but they're locked in by Capra, who turns on the gas. Nick and Hank break down the door to escape, but Capra has already escaped with a woman from the bar.

Meanwhile, a man (Henri Lubatti) shows up in the police station, asking Sgt. Wu (Reggie Lee) for the officer (Nick) who killed his friend, Hulda (the Reaper that tried to kill Marie). Captain Renard (Sasha Roiz) tells him to check his information. Renard later meets with the man, admonishing him for arriving at Portland without his permission and cutting his ear off with his own scythe, telling him to never come back.

Nick and Hank follow Capra using a tracking device attached to his car. They find him in a park: he flees, but is hit by a motorist. As Nick and Hank walk away, Capra uses his pheromones on a female paramedic.

== Reception ==
=== Viewers ===
The episode was viewed by 5.44 million people, earning a 1.6/5 in the 18-49 rating demographics on the Nielson ratings scale, marking a 5% increase in viewership and ranking second in its timeslot and fourth for the night in the 18-49 demographics, behind Dateline NBC, CSI: NY and Blue Bloods. This means that 1.6 percent of all households with televisions watched the episode, while 5 percent of all households watching television at that time watched it.

=== Critical reviews ===
"Lonelyhearts" received mixed-to-positive reviews. Amy Ratcliffe of IGN gave the episode a "okay" 6.0 out of 10 and wrote "This series has to be careful to balance the camp factor and the dark subject. If it goes too far in either direction, it just becomes something silly. The bee episode was too campy. I feel like this episode hit the ideal balance and added in a touch of horror movie feeling. It's too bad the plot wasn't meaty; it was just... toad-y. Standard cases aren't enough for this show. We've already seen Grimm can do better, and I hope it does."

The A.V. Club's Kevin McFarland gave the episode a "B−" grade and wrote, "I'm having a hard time assigning a grade to this episode of Grimm. Really I've been having a hard time grading this whole series. Look, I like classic Disney movies as much as the next animation fan, but the way Once Upon A Time takes the path of least resistance with all of its princess characters has really started to bore me. Other than Rumpelstiltskin, who's a breath of fresh air thanks to an extraordinary re-interpretation, most of the OUaT cast fails to defy expectation. It's not just that I've got the Grimm beat here at the A.V. Club, I honestly believe that what this show is doing to reinterpret fairy tales and folklore is genuinely more creative than how ABC's fantasy drama is doing with Disney stock characters."

TV Overmind's Shilo Adams wrote, "One of my main problems with the pilot of Grimm was its worrying dual selves, wherein the show could go big and a little campy or it could go dark and somewhat gritty, with both sides of the coin containing a certain amount of credibility. It's a backhanded sort-of problem ('you do too many things well! stop it!') that generally gets worked out through time, network notes, and fan feedback, but until it does get worked out, episodes tend to be more hit-and-miss than the talent involved would make you think."

Nick McHatton from TV Fanatic, gave a 3.5 star rating out of 5, stating: "'Lonelyhearts' didn't offer much this week, there were some high points, but they were few and far between. As always, one of the high points was Eddie, in a slightly different capacity no less! Nick's reliance on the book to paint a bigger back story on the Blue Beards allowed us to get a better idea of what the creature was before Eddie filled us in with small details about them. By doing this, Eddie's role was expanded slightly. Less exposition by Eddie means more comedy, and that's always a good thing."
