= Let Your Hair Down (Grimm) =

- Grimm episode
- Episode no.: Season 1 Episode 7
- Directed by: Holly Dale
- Written by: Sarah Goldfinger; Naren Shankar
- Cinematography by: Cort Fey
- Editing by: Jacque Toberen
- Production code: 107
- Original air date: December 16, 2011
- Running time: 43 minutes

Guest appearances
- Claudia Christian as Mrs. Clark; Ted Rooney as James Addison; Mary Jon Nelson as Holly Clark

Episode chronology
← Previous "The Three Bad Wolves"	Next → "Game Ogre"
- Grimm season 1

"Let Your Hair Down" is the 7th episode of the supernatural drama television series Grimm of season 1 and the mid-season finale which premiered on December 16, 2011, on NBC. The episode was written by co-executive producer Sarah Goldfinger and executive producer Naren Shankar, and was directed by Holly Dale.

== Plot ==
Opening quote: "The enchantress was so hard-hearted that she banished the poor girl to a wilderness, where she had to live in a miserable, wretched state."

A couple hiking through the woods is captured by a drug dealer. As he prepares to kill them, he is lured away and killed by a creature, and the hikers escape. Nick (David Giuntoli) and Hank (Russell Hornsby) join other officers attending the scene. Nick discovers buckshot and a hair, and then spots a female Blutbad, who flees. Later, he asks Monroe (Silas Weir Mitchell) to help him. They enter the woods and Monroe tracks down the female Blutbad. She again runs, but they follow her to her treehouse, which they enter to find her passed out and ill with fever.

Bud (the man who previously fled from Nick after realizing he was a Grimm) tells two of his friends that he has seen a Grimm. They are skeptical but admit he is right when they pass Nick's house at night. When Nick arrives home, they flee. At the station, Sgt. Wu (Reggie Lee) tells Hank that DNA from the hair matches a previous case Hank was involved with: a missing girl named Holly Clark (Mary Jon Nelson).

The dealer's brothers kidnap the male hiker, suspecting he killed their brother. Nick determines that the female Blutbad is Holly Clark. Monroe comforts her while Nick gives the news to Hank. Hank and Sgt. Wu interrogate neighbour James Addison (Ted Rooney). In the treehouse, Nick finds camping gear tagged with the name "Addison", and calls Hank to let him know. Upon learning this, Hank immediately confronts and arrests Addison.

The brothers arrive at the treehouse, now thinking Monroe is responsible for the dealer's death. While he tries to explain, Nick and Holly subdue the brothers. Nick takes Holly home to her mother, while Captain Renard (Sasha Roiz) makes an announcement to the media about her rescue. The episode ends as Holly identifies Addison from a line-up, while her eyes turn red.

== Reception ==
=== Viewers ===
The episode was viewed by 5.16 million people, earning a 1.5/5 in the 18-49 rating demographics on the Nielson ratings scale, marking a 5% decrease in viewership and ranking first in its timeslot and for the first time, ranking first for the night in the 18-49 demographics. This means that 1.5 percent of all households with televisions watched the episode, while 5 percent of all households watching television at that time watched it.

=== Critical reviews ===
"Let Your Hair Down" received positive reviews. Amy Ratcliffe of IGN gave the episode a "great" 8.0 out of 10 and wrote "This episode shows that the supernatural can be blended in with a soft touch. Holly was a Blutbad, sure, but more importantly she was a lost girl. She survived alone in the woods for years because of her wolf-ness; she was able to come back to reality because of connecting with Monroe. The fairy tale aspect was relevant to the story, but it didn't take center stage. The emotional and scary parts of her ordeal were able to shine through. It was an ideal mix."

The A.V. Club's Kevin McFarland gave the episode a "B−" grade and wrote, "Grimm has too many threads to follow right now, and it's painted itself into a corner where even a few great scenes that move the episodic plot along and tease out some details of the creature world leaves something out, and tonight that was the slow crawl of the season-long arc. There is very little narrative drive beyond a weekly case and some background information from Eddie Monroe. Once Upon A Time finds itself in a position where it's using flashbacks to serve a constant drive forward in an ongoing story, and not focusing as much on the episodic conflicts. Grimm is getting too bogged down in the Law & Order case-of-the-week and not providing enough in serialization. It's still in a state of flux, and doesn't quite know what it wants to be. I'm along for the ride, and any episode that features Silas Weir Mitchell in a bigger role can't be all bad, but 'Let Your Hair Down' is a warning sign that Grimm has too many plates in the air, and if it isn't careful, they're all going to come tumbling down and make a huge mess."

TV Overmind's Shilo Adams wrote, "When I took on the role of writing about Grimm, I was a tad nervous. I’m not a huge watcher of procedurals and very rarely watch cop dramas in my free time, so I simply hoped that the show would toss in enough serial elements to keep me interested to go along with the expected legal wranglings of Portland, Oregon. After a sluggish start in terms of character beats, it looks like Grimm is on its way to being able to please fans of the serial and procedural elements of TV, if 'Let Your Hair Down' is any indication. Grimm may not stack up character moments like its genre show peers, but when it does decide to give you a peek behind the curtain, it's usually a whole lot of fun, as evidenced by last night's episode that gave just about everybody a moment or two to just be themselves."

Nick McHatton from TV Fanatic, gave a 4.2 star rating out of 5, stating: "Over the last two episodes, Grimm has found a storytelling pace that really works, and it's beginning to offer payoffs to plot elements laid out weeks ago. Now if only I can figure out if Juliette is an evil-doer and Renard would actually do something fairy tale-ish."
