= 20 Years After =

2007 American post-apocalyptic film

- Theatrical release poster
- Directed by: Jim Torres; Ron Harris
- Written by: Jim Torres
- Produced by: Derek Thornton
- Starring: Azura Skye; Joshua Leonard; Nathan Baesel
- Cinematography: Bill Sweikart
- Edited by: Jim Torres
- Music by: John Heitzenrater; Chris Johnson
- Distributed by: MTI Home Video
- Release date: December 7, 2007
- Running time: 95 minutes
- Country: United States
- Language: English
- Budget: $1 million

20 Years After is a 2007 American post-apocalyptic film directed by Jim Torres and Ron Harris and starring Azura Skye, Joshua Leonard, and Nathan Baesel. Filmed principally in north Alabama and southern Tennessee, the low-budget film was initially released under the title Like Moles, Like Rats, a reference to the Thornton Wilder play The Skin of Our Teeth.

== Premise ==
The events take place 20 years after a nuclear war which was followed by plagues. No children have been born in 15 years, and people want to gain control of the first pregnant woman - Sara. Running out of water, Sara and her mother are forced to leave their shelter in Samuel's basement and join other groups of refugees who call themselves internally displaced people. Michael is a disc jockey who operates a radio station at one of the camps. David runs a gang of looters.

== Cast ==
- Azura Skye as Sara
- Reg E. Cathey as Dr. Samuel Singleton
- Nathan Baesel as David
- Joshua Leonard as Michael
- Diane Salinger as Margaret (Sara's mother)
- Aaron Hendry as Pierre
- Charlie Talbert as Janus
- Shannon Eubanks as Mrs. Mynard
- Khadijah Haqq as Delinda
- Dan Beene as Quincy
- Malika Haqq as Dilcy
- Deborah Duke as Mrs. Coday
- Philip Parker as Harvey
- Graham Roden as Allen
