= Heartbeat (2016 TV series) =

- Genre: Medical drama Comedy drama
- Created by: Jill Gordon
- Based on: Heart Matters by Kathy Magliato
- Starring: Melissa George; Dave Annable; Don Hany; Shelley Conn; Joshua Leonard; Maya Erskine; D. L. Hughley; Jamie Kennedy; JLouis Mills
- Composers: Jon Ehrlich & Jason Derlatka
- Country of origin: United States
- Original language: English
- No. of seasons: 1
- No. of episodes: 10

Production
- Executive producers: Jill Gordon; Amy Brenneman; Brad Silberling; Robert Duncan McNeill
- Producers: Susie Schelling; Yolonda Lawrence
- Cinematography: Lloyd Ahern II and Scott Williams
- Running time: 43 minutes
- Production companies: P.D. Oliver Inc; Molly Bloom Productions; Reveal; Universal Television

Original release
- Network: NBC
- Release: March 22 – May 25, 2016

Heartbeat (formerly Heartbreaker during production) is an American medical comedy-drama television series based on the real life of Dr. Kathy Magliato, as described in her book Heart Matters. It stars Melissa George as Alex Panttiere, a world-renowned heart-transplant surgeon at the fictional St. Matthew's Hospital in Los Angeles, who struggles to balance her personal and professional life. The series premiered on March 22, 2016, on NBC. On May 13, 2016, NBC canceled the series after one season.

== Plot ==
Alex Panttiere is a cardio-thoracic surgeon, and a very good one. She has just been appointed to a senior role at a major hospital. While this brings more responsibility, it does not dull her rebelliousness or unconventional methods.

== Cast ==
=== Main ===
- Melissa George as Dr. Alexandra Panttiere, the new Chief Innovation Officer (CIO) of St. Matthew's hospital, a cutting-edge research hospital. She has a very idiosyncratic personality, and is constantly dealing with demons from her past history at the hospital.
- Dave Annable as Dr. Pierce Harrison, Alex's boyfriend and fellow surgeon.
- Don Hany as Dr. Jesse Shane, chief of surgery at St. Matthews, and Alex's former mentor from when she interned at the hospital.
- Shelley Conn as Dr. Millicent Silvano, hospital administrator. She is a stickler for procedure and the rules, much to Alex's chagrin.
- Joshua Leonard as Max Elliot, Alex's gay ex-husband
- Maya Erskine as Nurse Ji-Sung
- D. L. Hughley as Dr. Myron Hackett, hospital psychiatrist
- Jamie Kennedy as Dr. Casey Callahan, a surgeon in the hospital.
- JLouis Mills as Dr. Forester, the resident anesthesiologist who is blind in one eye.

=== Recurring ===
- Caitlyn Larimore as Lynn
- Greyson Foster as Gabrielle Elliot
- Rudy Martinez as Marty
- Adlu Fahrezy as Rudi

== Episodes ==
No.	Title	Directed by	Written by	Original release date	US viewers (millions)
1	"Pilot"	Robert Duncan McNeill	Story by : Jill Gordon; Teleplay by : Jill Gordon	March 22, 2016	6.30
We are thrown into the life of successful heart surgeon and CIO of St. Matthew's Hospital, Dr. Alexandra Panttiere (Melissa George), as she struggles dealing with her intertwining professional and personal lives. Alex must find a heart for a patient when the one originally given to her was taken by another patient. When the patient's boyfriend kills himself in order to give his heart to her, Alex goes up against the hospital administrators to perform an unapproved heart transplant.
2	"Twins"	Allison Liddi-Brown	Jill Gordon	March 23, 2016	5.16
Alex uses "lights and sirens" to get to the hospital faster, to the angst of Dr. Patel. Shane hands over to Alex the treatment of twins (Justina Machado), joined at the back and side and sharing one lung, one of whom has cancer. Alex must figure out how to operate on one of them without hurting or killing the other or both.
3	"Backwards"	Reginald Hudlin	Jill Gordon	March 30, 2016	4.75
When a patient (Nick Thurston) comes into the ER talking backwards, the doctors want to perform a cutting edge stem cell injection into his brain to repair the damage that was caused by an injury sustained in a car accident. When an earthquake strikes during the surgery and breaks the tank holding the blood that was removed, the surgical team races against the clock to bring the patient back to life. Meanwhile, Alex and Harrison's relationship takes a twist, and Millicent makes them sit in therapy with Dr. Hackett.
4	"100,000 Heartbeats"	Helen Shaver	Mark B. Perry	April 6, 2016	3.90
The hospital wants to try an experimental cancer treatment that was tested in Mumbai, India with 90% success, with the risk being immediate death to the patient. However, when Harrison is frank with the subjects regarding the risks, they all back out, much to Alex's angst. She posts an ad on Craigslist to find more candidates, causing a ruckus in the hospital as they need to decide which patients to accept and whom to turn down. Meanwhile, Alex and Harrison's relationship continues to struggle, and Max's Boyfriend asks him to marry him, resulting in an awkward situation for him and Alex.
5	"The Land of Normal"	Allison Liddi-Brown	Jennifer Cecil	April 20, 2016	3.96
Alex tries to learn to use a new robot in order to operate on a patient who cannot have open heart surgery. Millicent begins to sleep with the artist who is doing a sculpture in the hospital. Alex deals with her socially awkward son.
6	"The Inverse"	Liz Friedlander	Lynn Sternberger	April 27, 2016	4.49
When a patient with backwards organs, that Alex and Millicent almost lost their jobs on saving 10 years previously, dies from complications, forces them to work with Dr. Shane to overcome the many obstacles present to re-transplant the heart into another reluctant patient. Meanwhile, Harrison must deal with Alex's son's head lice.
7	"Permanent Glitter"	Allison Liddi-Brown	Mike Lyons	May 4, 2016	4.15
When a transgender woman is diagnosed with breast cancer, Alex and Ji-Sung fight to save her life and her identity. Meanwhile, a beautiful consultant from another hospital forces Jesse to confront his feelings for Alex.
8	"Match Game"	Ed Ornelas	Cindy Appel	May 11, 2016	4.34
When Alex's father needs a new kidney, a surprising donor is revealed; family secrets put a father and daughter's relationship in jeopardy.
9	"Sanctuary"	Sarah Pia Anderson	Cindy Appel & Mike Lyons	May 18, 2016	3.86
Dr. Alex Panttiere makes her best effort to bring the dying wish of a young heart patient to fruition.
10	"What Happens in Vegas...Happens"	Allison Liddi-Brown	Story by : Yolonda Lawrence & Lynn Sternberger; Teleplay by : Jill Gordon & Yolonda Lawrence	May 25, 2016	4.26
Alex struggles to save the lives of Jesse, Pierce and Ji-Sung after a deadly sickness throws the hospital into lockdown; Millicent is left picking up the pieces after Alex defies CDC orders.

== Production ==
NBC picked up the pilot to series under the name Heartbreaker in May 2015. The series was moved to a midseason release due to George's real-life pregnancy. In December 2015, NBC changed the title from Heartbreaker to Heartbeat. The pilot was filmed in Vancouver, British Columbia, with the remainder of the season filmed at Universal Studios in Hollywood.

== Reception ==
Heartbeat has received negative reviews among critics. The review aggregator website Rotten Tomatoes reports a 17% approval rating. The site's critical consensus reads: "Heartbeat is a Frankensteined drama made up of hospital genre cliches and unlikable characters, though the cases-of-the-week are sporadically interesting." On Metacritic, the series holds a score of 37 out of 100 based on 22 reviews, indicating "generally unfavorable reviews".

=== Ratings ===
Viewership and ratings per episode of Heartbeat
No.	Title	Air date	Rating/share (18–49)	Viewers (millions)	DVR (18–49)	DVR viewers (millions)	Total (18–49)	Total viewers (millions)
1	"Pilot"	March 22, 2016	1.4/5	6.30	TBD	TBD	TBD	TBD
2	"Twins"	March 23, 2016	0.9/4	5.16	TBD	TBD	TBD	TBD
3	"Backwards"	March 30, 2016	0.9/3	4.75	TBD	TBD	TBD	TBD
4	"100,000 Heartbeats"	April 6, 2016	0.7/3	3.90	TBD	TBD	TBD	TBD
5	"The Land of Normal"	April 20, 2016	0.7/3	3.96	TBD	TBD	TBD	TBD
6	"The Inverse"	April 27, 2016	0.8/3	4.49	TBD	TBD	TBD	TBD
7	"Permanent Glitter"	May 4, 2016	0.8/3	4.15	TBD	TBD	TBD	TBD
8	"Match Game"	May 11, 2016	0.7/3	4.34	TBD	TBD	TBD	TBD
9	"Sanctuary"	May 18, 2016	0.7/3	3.86	TBD	TBD	TBD	TBD
10	"What Happens in Vegas...Happens"	May 25, 2016	0.7/3	4.26	TBD	TBD	TBD	TBD
