= Gordy Haab =

American composer

- Born: March 10, 1976 (age 50); Richmond, Virginia, U.S.
- Genres: Video game music; film score; classical
- Occupations: Composer; conductor; orchestrator
- Website: www.gordyhaabmusic.com

Gordy Haab (born 1976) is an American film, video game and television composer based in Los Angeles, California. His work has been featured in works associated with franchises including Star Wars Battlefront II, for which he won Video Game Score of the Year from the American Society of Composers, Authors and Publishers. Haab is also known for his work on Microsoft's Halo Wars 2, for which he was nominated for a 2017 HMMA award. His score for Electronic Arts' Star Wars: Battlefront, won three awards at the 2016 GDC G.A.N.G. Awards: Music of the Year, Best Interactive Score, and Best Instrumental Score. Haab was also nominated for a BAFTA Games Awards for his work on Star Wars: Battlefront.

His work has been covered by publications, including the HuffPost, which said, "Star Wars Battlefront is sounding better and better every day...this new Star Wars music will light your saber." In 2015, Hardcore Gamer was among the first to link Haab to his inspiration by saying, "Star Wars Battlefront features the best game score John Williams never wrote." The Los Angeles Times has also recognized Haab's work, saying "the B-side to John Williams' score," and Billboard quoted Steve Schnur, the president of music for EA, as saying, "Gordy is one of the few composers in the world on Lucas' short list."

== Early life ==
Haab developed an early interest in music when he was six and was particularly moved by the score of the film E.T. the Extra-Terrestrial (1982). Haab decided to pursue a career in the industry by attending the Virginia Commonwealth University, where he learned to compose music by hand and it remains his preferred composition method, telling The Sound Architect that, "I say this not to discredit the use of technology, because it also plays a major role in my process. But a piano, a blank page, and a pencil – and no screens glowing in my face – has a way of quieting my soul and allowing me to just, write." Haab received a bachelor's degree in Jazz Music Composition in 1999. He then went on to the University of Southern California, where he received his master's in Scoring for Motion Pictures in 2001.

== Career ==
Among other projects, Haab scored Activision/AMC's The Walking Dead: Survival Instinct, based on the TV series, and Microsoft's Kinect: Star Wars, which won Best Music at the Hollywood Music In Media Awards. Haab continues to compose the music for Electrionic Arts and Bioware's Star Wars: The Old Republic, for which he was awarded Best Original Soundtrack and Best Instrumental Music at the 10th Annual GDC G.A.N.G. Awards. He has recorded and conducted his music with various groups from all around the world, including the London Symphony Orchestra, the San Francisco Symphony, the Nashville Symphony, London Voices and the Hollywood Studio Orchestra.

Haab's other film, television and video game credits include Anchor Bay's Behind the Mask: The Rise of Leslie Vernon; MTV's The Truth Below; Dave Barry's 'Guide to Guys;' Lionsgate's 'War;' The Oprah Winfrey Network's The Judds; Roadside Attractions Shrink; ABC's Greek; VH-1's Scream Queens; and LucasArts' Indiana Jones and the Staff of Kings.

== Discography ==
=== Films ===
Year	Title	Director	Studio(s)	Notes
2021	My Country, My Parents	Wu Jing, Zhang Ziyi, Xu Zheng, Shen Teng	China Film Co., Ltd.	Windriders segment only.
2023	Creation of the Gods I: Kingdom of Storms	Wuershan	Tencent Pictures	—N/a
2025	Creation of the Gods II: Demon Force	Wuershan	Tencent Pictures	—N/a
2026	Creation of the Gods III: Creation Under Heaven	Wuershan	Tencent Pictures	—N/a

=== Video games ===
Year	Title	Studio	Notes
2009	Indiana Jones and the Staff of Kings	LucasArts	
2011	Star Wars: The Old Republic	Electronic Arts	Composed with Mark Griskey
2012	Kinect Star Wars	LucasArts	Composed with Kyle Newmaster
2013	The Walking Dead: Survival Instinct	Activision	
2015	Star Wars Battlefront	Electronic Arts	
2017	Halo Wars 2	Microsoft Studios	Composed with Brian Trifon and Brian Lee White
2018	Star Wars: Battlefront II	Electronic Arts	
2019	Star Wars Jedi: Fallen Order	Electronic Arts	Composed with Stephen Barton
2020	Star Wars: Squadrons	Electronic Arts	
2022	MultiVersus	Warner Bros. Interactive Entertainment	Composed with Stephen Barton and Kevin Notar
2023	Star Wars Jedi: Survivor	Electronic Arts	Composed with Stephen Barton
2024	Star Wars: Hunters	Zynga	Composed with various artists
2024	Indiana Jones and the Great Circle	Bethesda Softworks	
2026	Star Wars Zero Company	Electronic Arts	
2026	Star Wars: Galactic Racer	Secret Mode	

== Awards ==
Year	Work	Organization	Category	Result	Ref.
2012	"Glory, The Galactic Republic" from Star Wars: The Old Republic	Game Audio Network Guild Awards	Best Original Instrumental Song	Won	
2012	Star Wars: The Old Republic	Game Audio Network Guild Awards	Best Original Soundtrack Album	Won	
2012	Kinect: Star Wars	Hollywood Music in Media Awards	Best Original Song-Video Game	Won	
2016	Star Wars: Battlefront	British Academy of Film and Television Arts	British Academy Games Award for Audio Achievement	Nominated	
2016	Star Wars: Battlefront	Game Audio Network Guild Awards	Best Interactive Score	Won	
2016	Star Wars: Battlefront	Game Audio Network Guild Awards	Music of the Year	Won	
2017	Halo Wars 2	Music in Visual Media Awards	Original Score - Video Game	Nominated	
2018	Star Wars Battlefront II	American Society of Composers, Authors, and Publishers	Video Game Score of the Year	Won	
2018	Star Wars Battlefront II	Game Audio Network Guild Awards	Best Interactive Score	Nominated	
2018	Star Wars Battlefront II	Game Audio Network Guild Awards	Best Cinematic Cutscene Audio	Nominated	
2018	Star Wars Battlefront II	Game Audio Network Guild Awards	Music of the Year	Nominated	
2018	Star Wars Battlefront II	Game Audio Network Guild Awards	Audio of The Year	Nominated	
2018	Crusaders of Light	Game Audio Network Guild Awards	Best Music in a Casual/Social Game	Nominated	
2018	Halo Wars 2	Game Audio Network Guild Awards	Best Interactive Score	Nominated	
2018	Halo Wars 2	Game Audio Network Guild Awards	Best Cinematic Cutscene Audio	Nominated	
2024	Star Wars Jedi: Survivor	The Recording Academy	Grammy Award for Best Score Soundtrack for Video Games and Other Interactive Media	Won	
2024	Star Wars Jedi: Survivor	Academy of Interactive Arts & Sciences	D.I.C.E. Award for Outstanding Achievement in Original Music Composition	Nominated	
2024	Star Wars Jedi: Survivor	British Academy of Film and Television Arts	British Academy Games Award for Music	Nominated	
2024	Star Wars Jedi: Survivor	Ivor Novello Awards	Best Original Video Game Score	Won	
2026	Indiana Jones and the Great Circle	The Recording Academy	Grammy Award for Best Score Soundtrack for Video Games and Other Interactive Media	Nominated	
2027	Star Wars Zero Company	The Recording Academy	Grammy Award for Best Score Soundtrack for Video Games and Other Interactive Media	Pending	
