= Nathan Baesel =

American actor

- Born: April 7, 1974 (age 52); La Palma, California, U.S.
- Education: Fullerton College; Juilliard School (BFA)
- Spouse: Kim Baesel
- Children: Nathaniel Baesel and Jonas Baesel

Nathan Baesel (born April 7, 1974, in La Palma, California) is an American actor.

== Biography ==
Baesel attended Buena Park High School. After high school he went to Fullerton College, before graduating from Juilliard School in 2002. He has appeared in various national television spots and guest starred in The District and CBS's Cold Case. He had a recurring role on ABC's science fiction drama Shaun Cassidy's Invasion, playing the one-armed deputy Lewis Sirk. Baesel is a founding member of NY-based Theater Mitu and he performs regularly for South Coast Repertory. He also starred in the horror movie Behind the Mask: The Rise of Leslie Vernon and in the post-apocalyptic film 20 Years After. He also starred on the June 25, 2021, episode of the Kill Count, covering Behind the Mask, he played Leslie Vernon 15 years after Behind the Mask was released.

== Filmography ==
=== Film ===
| Year | Title | Role | Notes |
|---|---|---|---|
| 2006 | Behind the Mask: The Rise of Leslie Vernon | Leslie Vernon | |
| 2008 | 20 Years After | David | |
| 2009 | Off the Ledge | Boston | |

=== Television ===
| Year | Title | Role | Notes |
|---|---|---|---|
| 2003 | The District | Rodney | |
| 2003 | Cold Case | Blaine Robbins | |
| 2005 | Invasion | Lewis Siri | |
| 2007 | Numb3rs | Jared Parr | |
| 2007 | Journeyman | Steven Kowalchuk | 13 episodes |
| 2009 | CSI: Miami | Marvin Duffy | |

=== Web ===
| Year | Title | Role | Notes |
|---|---|---|---|
| 2021 | The Kill Count | Leslie Vernon | "Behind the Mask: The Rise of Leslie Vernon (2006) KILL COUNT" |
