= Heavens Fall =

- Promotional poster
- Directed by: Terry Green
- Written by: Terry Green
- Produced by: Anna Marie Crovetti; Wade Danielson; Gloria Everett
- Starring: Timothy Hutton; Leelee Sobieski; David Strathairn; Azura Skye; Bill Sage; Anthony Mackie; James Tolkan; Bill Smitrovich; Maury Chaykin; Francie Swift
- Release date: July 20, 2006 (Stony Brooks Film Festival)
- Running time: 105 minutes
- Country: United States
- Language: English

Heavens Fall is a 2006 American film based on the Scottsboro Boys incident of 1931.

== Plot ==
In the film, two young white women (portrayed by Leelee Sobieski and Azura Skye) accuse nine black youths of rape in the segregated South. Timothy Hutton stars as criminal defense attorney Samuel Leibowitz. The film begins after the first trial of the nine in the bustling city of Scottsboro, Alabama. Samuel Leibowitz, a successful Jewish lawyer from New York is called down past the Mason–Dixon line to defend the nine black youths.

== Cast ==
- Timothy Hutton ... Samuel Leibowitz
- David Strathairn ... Judge James E. Horton
- Leelee Sobieski ... Victoria Price
- Anthony Mackie ... William Lee
- Bill Sage ... Thomas Knight, Jr.
- Azura Skye ... Ruby Bates
- James Tolkan ... Thomas Knight, Sr.
- Bill Smitrovich ... George Chamlee
- Maury Chaykin ... Lyle Harris
- Joseph Lyle Taylor ... Joseph Brodsky
- B. J. Britt ... Haywood Patterson
- Francie Swift ... Belle Leibowitz

== Production ==
A train from the Tennessee Valley Railroad Museum was used in the filming.

== Release ==
Heavens Fall was released on DVD in the US in 2007.

== See also ==
- Timeline of the civil rights movement
