= Star Wars Zero Company =

- Developers: Bit Reactor; Respawn Entertainment
- Publisher: Electronic Arts
- Director: Greg Foertsch
- Producer: Caydence Funk
- Designers: James Brawley; Grayson Scantlebury
- Programmer: Ryan McFall
- Writer: Aaron Contreras
- Composer: Gordy Haab
- Series: Star Wars
- Engine: Unreal Engine 5
- Platforms: PlayStation 5; Windows; Xbox Series X/S
- Release: August 27, 2026
- Genre: Turn-based tactics
- Mode: Single-player

Star Wars Zero Company is a 2026 turn-based tactics video game developed by Bit Reactor and published by Electronic Arts. It was released for the PlayStation 5, Windows, and Xbox Series X/S on August 27, 2026.

Part of the Star Wars franchise, the game is set during the waning years of the Clone Wars and the beginning of the Galactic Empire. Players assume control of Tesh Hawks, the leader of Zero Company, a group of misfits and mercenaries tasked with stopping the Infinite Coil, a mysterious cult emerging as a threat to the galaxy. Development began after Bit Reactor's formation in 2022 and was initially pitched as part of the Titanfall universe. That same year, EA announced the then-unnamed game as one of three in active development before being officially announced in early 2025 as Star Wars Zero Company during Star Wars Celebration.

It is primarily a turn-based tactics game. Bit Reactor is composed of several former employees from Firaxis Games, which worked on the XCOM series beginning in 2008. The game was designed as an accessible entry point to the genre, although it includes elements such as permadeath. It also features role-playing elements, with players able to customize characters and manage relationships between Hawks and other characters. Combat is done from a top-down perspective, where players use limited action points to move, damage enemies, or support teammates. Outside of combat, level exploration is done from a third-person perspective, intended to evoke the style of traditional action-adventure games.

The game received positive reviews from critics, who praised the combat system and plot, although some criticized technical issues. It sold one million copies in its first month of release and is nominated for PC Game of the Year at the 44th Golden Joystick Awards.

== Gameplay ==
In this gameplay screenshot, the player's squad is fighting against droids of the Confederacy of Independent Systems.

Players can customize Hawks' gender, appearance, and voice at the beginning of the game. Combat in the game is turn-based, and played from a top-down perspective. Players issue commands to a squad of characters, which may include custom mercenaries as well as story-based characters. These characters can be sorted into different classes, though story-based characters have access to their own unique skills and abilities. Players can also create their own astromech droids, which focus on supporting the party and utilizing explosives. In each turn, each characters only has a limited number of action points that dictate how many actions they can perform and how far they can move, though they can be replenished within a turn using certain abilities. Squad members can sustain lasting injuries or suffer permanent death, though the narrative continues regardless of who is lost. Players can choose from four different difficulty levels: Story, Normal, Hard or Expert. On any difficulty, an optional modifier called "Beskar Mode" restricts the player to one save file that is erased if Hawks or any other story-based character dies. Different missions have different objectives. While each level is designed by the developer, the placement of enemies is procedurally generated.

Between missions, players manage the Den, a base of operations, to conduct research, upgrade their gear, and launch strategic investigations and tactical strikes. Players advance time, known as cycles, as they complete missions. Some objectives are time-limited, meaning that they will expire if they are not completed in time. Players can start non-combat operations to gather intel. In these missions, players must make narrative decisions that may lead to consequences several cycles later. The game features a progression system where players can choose which permanent upgrades to deny their enemies through sabotage. The game features elements commonly found in role-playing video games. Outside of combat, players can explore the world from a third-person perspective. At the Den, the player character can converse with different squad members. They will have differing personalities and world views and players must resolve their conflicts. Low approval and dissatisfaction will trigger specific narrative consequences and story moments. Conversely, characters who frequently participate in combat operations together will develop stronger bonds, providing them with significant tactical synergy bonuses.

== Plot ==
In 19 BBY, the final year of the Clone Wars, former Galactic Republic captain Tesh Hawks leads the independent mercenary outfit Zero Company. Several years prior, Hawks was dismissed from military service after taking blame for a disastrous defeat against the Separatists. Members of Zero Company include Trick, a clone trooper who served with Hawks and joined Zero Company after being medically discharged; Runa Blask, a Togruta partisan who is second-in-command and Zero Company's financial consultant; and Kabb Uppercut, a former boxer who has a cybernetic left arm.

Heavily indebted to the Hutts, Zero Company undertakes mercenary contracts to remain solvent. During a mission on Serolonis, the group encounters the Infinite Coil, a Separatist-aligned cult led by Kundri Fathom and droid general Typhon. Members of the Coil are infected with the Shadow Plague, a mysterious disease that kills some victims while leaving survivors physically enhanced and susceptible to Fathom's influence. After learning of the encounter, Republic Intelligence officer Bennic Halloren and Republic-aligned Luunatan noble Jae Mordant offer to forgive Zero Company's debt if they help stop the Coil.

Zero Company traces the Coil's activities to an initiation ceremony on Courtsilius. There, they encounter Tel-Rea, a Tognath Jedi Padawan who independently pursues the Coil while attempting to complete her deceased Master's final mission. Together, they rid Courtsilius of the Coil, and Tel-Rea joins Zero Company. Zero Company infiltrates a prisoner exchange between the Republic, represented by Anakin Skywalker, and Umbaran Partisans on Bespin. During the exchange, the Coil kills Rhy Cesca, the Partisan leader and Republic prisoner Luco Bronc's lover, for defying the Separatists. Despite Bronc's hatred of the Republic, he joins Zero Company to seek vengeance.

Zero Company's investigation leads them to Luunata, which they liberate from the Coil. As a result, Jae leaves Zero Company to continue her work. Republic Intelligence locates Fathom and the remaining Coil leadership and sends the elite Stillwatch Battalion to help capture her. However, Supreme Chancellor Palpatine issues Order 66 and reorganizes the Republic into the Galactic Empire. Trick's inhibitor chip causes him and Stillwatch to turn against Tel-Rea and Zero Company. Zero Company emerges victorious and escapes, but Trick is sent into a coma.

One year later, Zero Company has abandoned its mission to stop the Coil and operates as fugitives from the Empire. Jae contacts Zero Company for help escaping Imperial-ruled Luunata, and she rejoins the team. On Umbara, they help Captain Rex, who offers to remove Trick's inhibitor chip in exchange for helping the Umbaran Partisans fight against the Empire. Trick is then sent to Ord Mantell, where he has his chip removed and completes his training to become a clone commando. The Hutts hire Zero Company for a job, where Hawks is betrayed and captured by the Coil. Fathom infects Hawks with the plague, but Hawks resists Fathom's influence. Typhon reveals that the Shadow Plague is sentient and creates a hive mind between the infected before they abandon Hawks. While escaping, Hawks sees Bennic, now an ISB Supervisor, leading Imperial reinforcements. Hawks' encounter with Fathom renews interest in stopping her.

Zero Company tracks Typhon to Cindermoor, where they destroy him. Fathom attempts to escape with the Shadow Plague while Imperial forces led by Bennic arrive, seeking to acquire the plague. Unwilling to allow either the Coil or the Empire to possess the plague, Zero Company pursues her as Coil forces battle the Empire. Zero Company boards Bennic's Star Destroyer, under attack by the Coil and Fathom, and fights through Fathom's remaining forces before confronting her. During the battle, Hawks contacts Bennic and persuades him to help, making Bennic have a change of heart. Fathom uses her connection to the Shadow Plague to attempt to exert influence over Hawks, but Zero Company, with assistance from Bennic, defeats and kills her. Her death severs her influence over those infected by the plague, and the remaining Infinite Coil forces begin to collapse. In the aftermath, Zero Company remains together as the Empire continues expanding its control over the galaxy, and they vow to disrupt it as much as possible.

== Development and release ==
Star Wars Zero Company was developed by Bit Reactor, a studio founded in 2022. The development included many former staffers of Firaxis Games, including Greg Foertsch, founder of the company and creative director of the game. Foertsch previously served as the art director for the modern XCOM games. Foertsch was invited by Vince Zampella, the founder of Respawn Entertainment, to create a Star Wars tactics game. It was revealed in September 2026 that Zero Company was originally pitched as a game based on the Titanfall series and Apex Legends.

The game was created with high production values, with the team introducing third-person sections styled similarly to cinematic action-adventure games. Aaron Contreras, who previously worked on the Star Wars Jedi games, served as the game's writer. The team was divided about adding permadeath, though it was subsequently decided that the inclusion of this feature fit Star Wars' core theme about loss. The game was designed to be accessible, with the team using the story to tutorialize its core gameplay mechanics. The Clone Wars era was chosen as the setting as the team felt that it provided a lot of opportunities for the team to tell an original story. The team read a lot of Star Wars books, as well as visiting Wookieepedia, to determine what planets and locations to include. At San Diego Comic-Con, Dee Bradley Baker and Matt Lanter were announced to be reprising their roles as clone troopers and Anakin Skywalker, respectively. The animated series Star Wars: The Clone Wars, the film Rogue One, the TV series Andor, as well as the war film The Dirty Dozen inspired the themes and tone.

In January 2022, EA announced that Respawn was developing three games set in the Star Wars universe, including a sequel to Star Wars Jedi: Fallen Order (Jedi: Survivor), an unnamed first-person shooter which had since been cancelled, and Zero Company. Zero Company was announced in April 2025 during Star Wars Celebration in Japan. Publisher Electronic Arts released the game for PlayStation 5, Windows, and Xbox Series X/S on August 27, 2026.

Shortly after release, there were reports that the developer Bit Reactor had put 80% of the developing staff on unpaid furlough.

=== Music ===
"Zero Company" by Gordy Haab, the first single from the Star Wars Zero Company Video Game Soundtrack, was released on July 25, 2026. The full soundtrack was released on Hollywood Records on August 27, 2026.

== Reception ==
Reception

Aggregate scores
Aggregator	Score
Metacritic	PC: 84/100; PS5: 83/100; XSXS: 85/100
OpenCritic	95% recommend

Review scores
Publication	Score
Game Informer	8/10
GameSpot	8/10
GamesRadar+	4/5
IGN	9/10

Star Wars Zero Company received "generally favorable" reviews from critics, according to review aggregator Metacritic. OpenCritic determined that 95% of critics recommended the game.

IGN Critic Dan Stapleton gave the game a 9/10 score. He praised the story and unique gameplay design compared to other turn-based games, calling it an "excellent tactical game," but criticized it for graphical bugs. Ted Litchfield for PC Gamer scored Star Wars Zero Company 90/100, citing the game's plot, characters, and class design as particularly strong. He called the game a "complete package" but had some issues with its exploration segments and bugs. Game Informer's James Galizio compared the game favorably to XCOM for its gameplay loop backed up by "strong map and mission design." Gry-Online critic Adam Kusiak highly praised the combat system. However, he criticized the side missions, story length, and technical issues. GameSpot's Steve Watts commended the game for its intuitive design for a tactical game and satisfying combat, which he felt covered for otherwise reptitive gameplay objectives.

=== Sales ===
In August 2026, Zero Company was the 11th-most-downloaded PlayStation 5 game in the United States, Canada, and Europe. In the United Kingdom, it debuted at number 2 on the physical sales chart for the week ending August 29. On Steam, Zero Company was the best-selling game between 25 August and 1 September.

The game had sold more than 1 million copies by October 2026.

=== Awards ===
Year	Award	Category	Result	Ref.
2026	Golden Joystick Awards 2026	Best Supporting Performer (Vic Michaelis)	Nominated	
2026	Golden Joystick Awards 2026	PC Game of the Year	Nominated	
2026	The Game Awards 2026	Best Sim/Strategy Game	Pending	
2027	69th Annual Grammy Awards	Best Score Soundtrack for Video Games and Other Interactive Media	Pending	
