= Confessions of an Ugly Stepsister =

1999 novel by Gregory Maguire

- Author: Gregory Maguire
- Cover artist: Douglas Smith
- Language: English
- Genre: Fantasy
- Publisher: William Morrow
- Publication date: November 1, 1999
- Publication place: United States
- Media type: Print (hardback & paperback)
- Pages: 368 (hardback)
- ISBN: 0-06-098752-9
- OCLC: 44681757
- Dewey Decimal: 813/.54 21
- LC Class: PS3563.A3535 C66 1999

Confessions of an Ugly Stepsister is a 1999 fantasy novel by American writer Gregory Maguire, retelling the tale of Cinderella through the eyes of one of her "ugly stepsisters." In 2002, the book was adapted into a TV movie of the same name directed by Gavin Millar. The book is dedicated to Andy Newman, Maguire's husband.

== Plot ==
Confessions of an Ugly Stepsister tells the story of Iris, the plain younger daughter of Margarethe Fisher, as she takes care of her mentally handicapped older sister Ruth and her beautiful stepsister Clara. Having fled from the Fens of Cambridgeshire, England; to Haarlem, the Netherlands. Upon her father's death, Iris is slightly at odds with the world and often contemplates the value of beauty and ugliness. While caring for her sisters and keeping the peace between Clara and Margarethe, Iris develops a painter's eye and spends time studying under a local painter known as The Master, and his apprentice, Caspar.

Margrethe makes Iris and Ruth go to the ball in the hopes of making the prince fall in love with Iris. Iris secretly helps Clara get to the ball and the prince immediately falls in love with her. While at the ball, Ruth does the unthinkable out of jealousy and love of Clara and Master, burning down the Master's magnum opus, a painting of Clara. That night, the fairy tale of Cinderella and her pumpkin carriage is spun, and the next morning her prince comes to collect her.

At the end of the tale, the characters' eventual fates are revealed: Iris marries Caspar and paints at his side, sometimes under his name; Caspar "dutifully" cares for Ruth; and Clara eventually dies in New Amsterdam from a complaint of the heart.

== Characters ==
- Iris Fisher / Iris van den Meer: the one whom the tale follows as she views the events that would become the fairy tale. She is the daughter of Margarethe Fisher and Jack Fisher, and younger sister to Ruth Fisher. When her mother marries Cornelius van den Meer, Iris becomes Clara van den Meer's stepsister. She is described as "painfully plain-faced" by her own mother, and several times refers to herself as a hound. Over the course of the story Iris develops an interest in art and painting, and develops feelings for Caspar, but firmly denies them. She is based on the younger stepsister.
- Margarethe ten Broek Fisher / Margarethe van den Meer: mother of Iris and Ruth Fisher, and later becomes the stepmother of Clara after marrying her father. Her motives for marrying Clara’s father are purely to keep herself and her daughters fed. Whether she loves Clara’s father is unstated and unlikely, especially given her motto of "Give me room to cast my eel spear, and let follow what may", but she is reasonably kind to him. It is hinted that the Master is interested in Margarethe, but his feelings are not returned. She is tough on all of the children and expects them to take care of her because she has more important things to do with her new life. She is based on the stepmother.
- Ruth Fisher / Ruth van den Meer: the oldest, mentally handicapped (possibly autistic) daughter of Margarethe Fisher, older sister of Iris and one of the stepsisters of Clara. She is ultimately revealed as the story's narrator. She is based on the older stepsister.
- Clara van den Meer: the only child of Van den Meer and his first wife, Henrika. She's a beautiful girl, but is kept hidden away in her home, originally against her will by her mother, but once her mother dies, she stays at home by choice. As a child, she was kidnapped and kept hostage in a windmill by a Mr. van Stolk, her father's business associate, who received half of her family's fortune as ransom. Clara believes that it was water-spirits who kidnapped her, and turned her into a changeling, which she believes that she is. After her mother's death, Clara begins to spend her time by the hearth and coins her own names of "Ashgirl", "Cinderling", and "Cinderella". She is based on the titular character.
- Henrika Vinckboons van den Meer: Clara's mother. She kept Clara locked inside their home, to protect her from the dangers of the world. She is poisoned by Margarethe and does not survive the birth of her second child. She is based on Cinderella's mother.
- Cornelius van den Meer: Clara's father. He's a businessman and involved in the tulip industry. The Fishers later refer to him as "Papa Cornelius". He goes into a seemingly catatonic state of depression, barely paying attention to anything but their oncoming poverty and how much his family has changed. He is based on Cinderella's father.
- Luykas Schoonmaker: a local painter "not quite known as the Master of the Dordrecht Altarpiece" and the first to shelter the Fishers. He later asks them to move back, but they do not return because Margarethe marries Van den Meer.
- Caspar: Master's apprentice. He's in love with Iris and she with him, but Margarethe disapproves and attempts to steer Iris away from him by hinting that Caspar is homosexual. In the epilogue in the novel, it is revealed that Caspar later marries Iris.

== Adaptation ==
Confessions of an Ugly Stepsister was adapted by writer Gene Quintano and director Gavin Millar into a TV movie for The Wonderful World of Disney. It was shot in Luxembourg and aired on March 10, 2002. It starred Azura Skye as Iris, Stockard Channing as Margarethe, Emma Poole as Ruth, Jenna Harrison as Clara, Jonathan Pryce as Schoonmaker, and Matthew Goode (in his debut) as Casper. This version was a more traditional interpretation, presenting Cinderella as a more sympathetic heroine (coining the name "Cinderella" when she begins helping Iris with chores so that she can go to the ball), including a fairy godmother-like figure, and giving Clara a pet mouse.

The film varies widely from the book:

- There are no religious or magical aspects in the movie, Clara never calls herself a changeling and the gallery of God's mistakes does not exist.
- Henrika disappears entirely; in the book she was poisoned by Margarethe and died during childbirth, while in the film she has been dead for many years.
- Clara is childlike in both behavior and appearance at the beginning of the book and slowly matures, in the movie she is already mature and only spoiled.
- Ruth is mainly mute and slow in the book, while in the film she talks more than a few times and often helps out.
- In the book, Clara is kept hidden by her mother until Henrika's death, after which her mother's teaching seems to have left an impression on her and Clara hardly leaves the house. In the movie, Clara hasn't left since her mother's death and is afraid of the things in the world.
- The movie adds in a fairy godmother figure.
- While the book's ending is somewhat tragic, the movie ends on a happy note.
- The book is narrated by one of the "ugly stepsisters", revealed to be Ruth. The movie is narrated by the Master.
