= 28 Days (film) =

2000 American comedy-drama film

- Theatrical release poster
- Directed by: Betty Thomas
- Written by: Susannah Grant
- Produced by: Jenno Topping
- Starring: Sandra Bullock; Viggo Mortensen; Dominic West; Diane Ladd; Elizabeth Perkins; Steve Buscemi
- Cinematography: Declan Quinn
- Edited by: Peter Teschner
- Music by: Richard Gibbs
- Production companies: Columbia Pictures; Tall Tree Productions
- Distributed by: Sony Pictures Releasing
- Release dates: April 6, 2000 (premiere); April 14, 2000 (United States)
- Running time: 104 minutes
- Country: United States
- Language: English
- Budget: $43 million
- Box office: $62.2 million

28 Days is a 2000 American comedy-drama film directed by Betty Thomas and written by Susannah Grant. Sandra Bullock stars as Gwen Cummings, a newspaper columnist obliged to enter rehabilitation for alcoholism. The film co-stars Viggo Mortensen, Dominic West, Elizabeth Perkins, Azura Skye, Steve Buscemi, and Diane Ladd.

== Plot ==
Gwen Cummings is an alcoholic who spends her nights in a drunken haze with her boyfriend, Jasper. They arrive late and disheveled to her sister Lily's wedding, where Gwen knocks over the wedding cake and drunkenly steals a limousine, crashing into a house. Given a choice between jail time or 28 days in a rehab center, she chooses rehab.

Gwen is introduced to a variety of patients: hypersexual cocaine addict Oliver, former doctor Daniel, mother of two Roshanda, older addict Bobbi Jean, and Dutch immigrant Gerhardt, and is assigned as roommate to teenage heroin addict Andrea. Angry and resistant, Gwen refuses to take part in treatment or admit she is an alcoholic. Throughout this, Gwen struggles with flashbacks of her addict mother, who died of an overdose when Gwen and Lily were children.

On visiting day, Jasper slips Gwen a bottle of painkillers and they sneak off for an inebriated day together. Cornell, the facility's director and a recovering addict himself prepares to kick Gwen out to serve her jail sentence, but she still denies that she has a problem. Storming back to her room, she takes one of her smuggled pills, but spits it out and tosses the bottle out of her third-story window. After spending the day suffering withdrawal symptoms alone, she climbs out of the window to retrieve the pills. She falls, severely sprains her ankle, and is rescued by Eddie, a new patient.

Finally convinced that she has a problem, Gwen asks Cornell for another chance and begins to participate in the recovery process. Jasper visits and proposes to Gwen with champagne, which she throws in the lake. Returning to her room, she stops Andrea from cutting herself, and grows closer to her and their fellow addicts, who warn that Jasper does not take her sobriety seriously. Gwen learns that Eddie is a professional baseball player, and they share an impulsive kiss but form a friendship instead. Discovering that he is a fan of Santa Cruz, Andrea's favorite soap opera, Gwen and the group begin watching it together.

Lily attends a group therapy session, revealing that a drunken Gwen ruined her wedding with a humiliating speech, and leaves in disgust when Gwen dismisses Lily's feelings. Andrea will soon be released, and Gwen arranges a farewell skit for the group to perform. Jasper shows up unannounced, and finds Gwen with Eddie; picking a fight, he insults them both and Eddie punches him, straining his friendship with Gwen. She discovers Andrea dead in their bathroom from an overdose and commits herself to restoring her relationship with her sister. They reconcile and Gwen leaves the facility after completing her course of treatment, but not before Eddie warns her that Jasper is dangerous to her sobriety.

Jasper offers to make amends, but Gwen realizes he is unwilling to change to support her recovery. Leaving him and their old party friends at a bar, she encounters a horse on the street and can lift its hoof on her second try (after asking for help), an activity she struggled with in rehab. She breaks up with Jasper and is later reunited with a sober Gerhardt at a floral shop. In a mid-credits scene, Eddie recognizes an actor from Santa Cruz who arrives as a new patient.

== Cast ==
- Sandra Bullock as Gwen Cummings, the film's protagonist; a newspaper columnist with drug and alcohol problems.
- Viggo Mortensen as Eddie Boone, a patient in rehab and a famous baseball player, who is addicted to alcohol, drugs, and sex.
- Dominic West as Jasper, Gwen's boyfriend and an alcoholic; he considers Gwen's recovery a joke.
- Elizabeth Perkins as Lily Cummings Topton, Gwen's older sister who gets married at the beginning of the film, has always been dismissive of her younger sister's struggles.
- Azura Skye as Andrea Delaney, a 17-year-old heroin addict.
- Steve Buscemi as Cornell Shaw, a recovering addict who now works as one of the counselors in the rehab clinic.
- Alan Tudyk as Dutch Gerhardt, a patient in rehab and a dancer. According to Tudyk, he played the same character in a supporting role in the unrelated 2011 film Transformers: Dark of the Moon.
- Mike O'Malley as Oliver, a patient in rehab and a sex addict.
- Marianne Jean-Baptiste as Roshanda, a patient in rehab and a mother of two young children.
- Reni Santoni as Daniel, a rehab patient and former doctor.
- Diane Ladd as Bobbie Jean, an elderly patient in rehab.
- Margo Martindale as Betty, the clinic's receptionist.
- Susan Krebs as Evelyn, the clinic's psychologist who leads all of the group meetings.
- Elijah Kelley as Darnell, one of Roshanda's children.
- Harsh Nayyar as Newsstand Vendor.

== Production ==
The film was shot in North Carolina. The YMCA Blue Ridge Assembly in Black Mountain, North Carolina, served as the Serenity Glen rehabilitation center.

== Reception ==
The film opened at number two at the United States box office making $10,310,672 in its opening weekend in 2,523 screens, behind Rules of Engagement, which was on its second consecutive week at the top spot. The film went on to make $37,035,515 in the U.S. The film made a total of $25,163,430 internationally, bringing its worldwide total to $62,198,945.

=== Critical response ===
On Rotten Tomatoes, the film has a 33% approval rating based on 86 reviews with an average rating of 4.9/10. The website's consensus states: "Even though 28 Days is tackling a difficult subject, it comes off light and superficial, and maybe even a little preachy." On Metacritic, it has a score of 46% based on reviews from 26 critics, indicating "mixed or average" reviews. Audiences surveyed by CinemaScore gave the film a grade "B+" on the scale of A to F.

Peter Travers of Rolling Stone gave it a positive review and wrote: "Count this rehab a success." Roger Ebert of the Chicago Sun-Times wrote: "Bullock brings a kind of ground-level vulnerability to 28 Days that doesn't make her into a victim but simply into one more suitable case for treatment." Owen Gleiberman of Entertainment Weekly gave the film a "B", stating that "Bullock gives it her all; she's bristling and alive on screen in a way that she hasn't been since Speed."

Stephen Holden of The New York Times said it "begins with such a flurry of promise that it comes as a sharp disappointment when this drug-rehab comedy skids out of control." Kenneth Turan of the Los Angeles Times called it "Too glib too often to make much of an impression any way you look at it."

== Music ==
Singer-songwriter Loudon Wainwright III, who plays one of the center's patients, contributed four songs to the soundtrack.
