= Behind the Mask: The Rise of Leslie Vernon =

2006 American mockumentary black comedy slasher film by Scott Glosserman

- Theatrical release poster
- Directed by: Scott Glosserman
- Written by: Scott Glosserman; David J. Stieve
- Produced by: Scott Glosserman
- Starring: Nathan Baesel; Angela Goethals; Scott Wilson; Kate Lang Johnson; Ben Pace; Britain Spellings; Zelda Rubinstein; Robert Englund
- Cinematography: Jaron Presant
- Edited by: Sean Presant
- Music by: Gordy Haab
- Production companies: GlenEcho Entertainment; Code Entertainment
- Distributed by: Anchor Bay Entertainment
- Release dates: March 12, 2006 (SXSW); March 16, 2007 (United States)
- Running time: 92 minutes
- Country: United States
- Language: English
- Box office: $69,136

Behind the Mask: The Rise of Leslie Vernon is a 2006 American mockumentary black comedy slasher film directed by Scott Glosserman, written by David J. Stieve, and starring Nathan Baesel, Angela Goethals, Scott Wilson, Zelda Rubenstein, and Robert Englund. An homage to the slasher genre, the film follows a journalist and her crew that are documenting an aspiring serial killer who models himself according to slasher film conventions.

Principal photography took place in Oregon, although the film takes place in a small town in Maryland. The film premiered at the 2006 South by Southwest film festival and was shown at several other festivals followed by a limited release in the United States on March 16, 2007. It is Zelda Rubenstein's final film released during her lifetime before her death in 2010.

== Plot ==
The film is shot as a documentary set in a world where the killers depicted in famous slasher films are historical figures. A journalist named Taylor Gentry and her two cameramen, Doug and Todd, document Leslie Vernon as he prepares to join the ranks of other slasher villains. Leslie claims to be a boy from a local urban legend who supposedly became possessed and killed his family before being killed by the townsfolk, but having in fact survived the attack. He walks Taylor and her crew through his plans but refuses to truly explain his motives.

Leslie plans to orchestrate a killing spree at his alleged family home, a rundown farm in the woods. At the farm, he plans to slaughter a number of teenagers before being confronted by his chosen virginal "survivor girl", a local seventeen-year-old high school student named Kelly Curtis. In addition to a strict training regime and learning theater techniques to create the proper atmosphere, he has rigged the farm to be in his favor: sealing off exits within the house, mapping the routes his victims will take, rigging the electrical system to fail, and tampering with potential weapons in the barn. Leslie also discusses the bizarre behavior of people in such circumstances, such as herding together without really protecting themselves, tripping on level and stable ground, and attempting to hide in obvious and dangerous locations.

During the documentary shoot, Leslie introduces Taylor and her crew to his mentor, Eugene, who vaguely elaborates on the motives of killers like himself: for them to be a sacrifice by acting as evil to counter and even bring out the good within the world. Eugene's wife offhandedly suggests Leslie kill the local librarian, Mrs. Collinwood, as a stinger kill in order to draw Kelly in, which he does after Eugene agrees that it's a good idea. However, Leslie's claim to be Leslie Vernon avenging his death is proven false when a psychiatrist, Doc Halloran, interrupts Taylor and her crew, revealing that Leslie is in fact an ordinary, mentally-unstable man named Leslie Mancuso, whom Halloran treated in Reno, Nevada. Taylor confronts Leslie about Halloran's allegation and Leslie becomes aggressive with her. Taylor contemplates ending the documentary, but reconciles with Leslie and chooses to continue filming. Taylor and her crew continue to film Leslie's meticulous preparations for his killing spree.

Though Taylor and her crew possess enthusiasm for Leslie's creativity, their consciences catch up with them on the night of the murders. They beg Leslie to call off his killing spree, but Leslie is adamant, believing that his survivor girl will define herself by facing him. He implores and invites the crew to leave but they ultimately decide to stop Leslie. At this point, the film's mise-en-scène shifts from documentary mode to a standard horror film presentation. Taylor attempts to warn and rally the remaining teens together to fight Leslie, attempting to use the knowledge they have against Leslie, but Leslie's preparations appear to have expected the crew remaining. The group looks to Kelly - who is revealed to not be a virgin - for leadership, but she unexpectedly dies when trying to escape. Taylor struggles to keep the teenagers from bumbling through Leslie's preordained schedule, with Todd sacrificing himself by drawing Leslie away from the house, one of the few disruptions that Leslie mentioned as being potentially ruinous to his plan.

Taylor quickly realizes that, as a virgin herself, she was Leslie's intended survivor girl all along. Leslie continues picking off the group one-by-one until only Taylor remains. She faces Leslie and defeats him in the exact manner he had laid out for her, crushing Leslie's head in the apple press, then burns down the shed in which he was defeated, apparently killing him. Outside, she finds Doug and Doc Halloran, who have both survived their encounters with Leslie.

Over the final credits, security camera footage reveals Leslie's charred body sitting up on an autopsy table, still alive.

== Cast ==
- Nathan Baesel as Leslie Vernon / Leslie Mancuso
- Angela Goethals as Taylor Gentry
- Robert Englund as Doc Halloran
- Kate Lang Johnson as Kelly
- Krissy Carlson as Lauren
- Scott Wilson as Eugene
- Zelda Rubinstein as Mrs. Collinwood
- Bridgett Newton as Jamie
- Ben Pace as Doug
- Britain Spellings as Todd
- Hart Turner as Shane
- Travis Zariwny as Dr. Meuller
- Teo Gomez as Stoned Guy
- Matt Bolt as Slightly More Stoned Guy
- Jenafer Brown as Virgin Girl
- Kane Hodder as Guy at Elm Street House

== Production ==
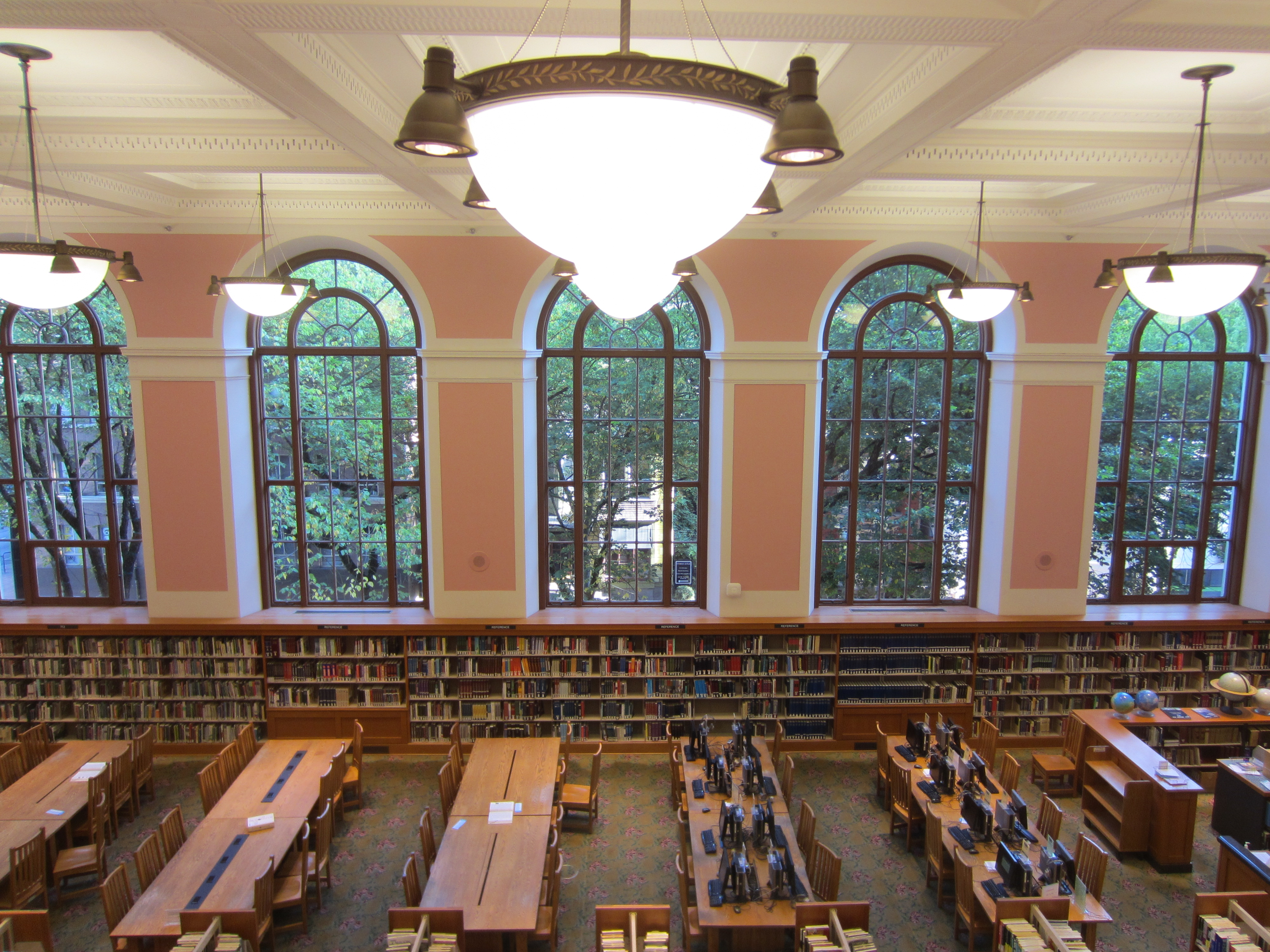
One of the film's key sequences was shot at the Central Library in Portland, Oregon

Behind the Mask was filmed largely in Portland, Oregon and the outlying towns of Troutdale, Banks, St. Helens, Estacada, and Sauvie Island. The establishing shots of Glen Echo were filmed on Main Street in downtown Troutdale. One of the film's key sequences featuring Leslie's confrontation with Kelly at the library was filmed at the Central Library in downtown Portland. Filming took place in November 2004.

Due to the limited budget and location restrictions, some of the script was re-written during filming to accommodate the filming locations. During filming, several locations needed for certain scenes had yet to be scouted and were discovered in the middle of shooting.

Actor Scott Wilson became involved in the film after a suggestion from friend Robert Englund, who was already cast in the film. According to writer David J. Stieve, Wilson's character, Eugene, was written as both a homage and an allusion to Billy Lenz, the antagonist of the 1974 film Black Christmas. He notes that both characters helped "pioneer the business of fear", but were not as widely recognized as much as their successors. In earlier drafts of the film's script, Eugene was more heavily implied to be Billy, but the idea was later abandoned in subsequent drafts in favor of making the character more of an archetype or an amalgamation of various slasher villains.

Director Scott Glosserman recruited a group of young local filmmakers in Portland to work as additional editors on the film after seeing and being impressed by an independent film they had produced called The Black Shoe Drifter.

== Release ==
The film premiered at the South by Southwest film festival in March 2006, and toured at other festivals, eventually acquiring distribution from Anchor Bay Entertainment, who released the film limitedly in the United States in March 2007.

=== Critical response ===
On the review aggregator website Rotten Tomatoes, Behind the Mask: The Rise of Leslie Vernon holds a 76% approval rating based on 42 critic reviews, with an average rating of 6.98/10. The consensus reads: "A smart mockumentary that presents a gory, funny, and obviously affectionate skewering of the slasher genre.” On Metacritic, the film has a 66/100 rating based on 14 critics, indicating "generally positive reviews".

Elizabeth Weitzman of the New York Daily News called the film "a must for those who like thrills laced with a sense of humor" and noted the film's deadpan sense of humor. James Berardinelli said that it "provides a fresh, chilling breeze through the stale air of the crypt that has become multiplex horror", and awarded it three out of four stars, while the Los Angeles Times referred to it as "original and weirdly delicious, and executed with gory aplomb."

Stephen Hunter of The Washington Post said the film's "breakdown of cliches is vivid and witty", noting that its intended audience was "genre deconstructionists" and "smart young people who have studied horror/slasher movies and enjoy them for their vulgar energy." Hunter also called the performances of Baesal and Goethals "brilliant".

Contrarily, The Village Voice gave the film an unfavorable review, stating: "Desperately overcompensating for the fact that most horror films are already parodies of themselves, Behind the Mask takes a bite out of the dumb Scream franchise before devouring its own tail, proving that you are what you eat."

=== Accolades ===
Year	Award	Organization	Category	Result
2006	Best European/North - South American Film	Fant-Asia Film Festival	Golden Prize	Won
2006	L'Écran Fantastique Award	Fant-Asia Film Festival	Golden Prize	Won
2006	Séquences Award	Séquences magazine	Jury Prize	Won
2006	Audience Award	Gen Art	Gen Art Film Festival	Won
2006	Carnet Jove - Special Mention	Sitges - Catalan International Film Festival	Midnight X-Treme	Won
2006	Audience Choice Award For Best Feature Film	Toronto After Dark Film Festival	Best Film	Won

Tyler Doupe of Fearnet included Leslie Vernon in his list of "Ten of Horror's Most Disarming Psychopaths".

== Home media ==
Scream Factory brought Behind the Mask: The Rise of Leslie Vernon to Blu-ray on March 27, 2018.

== Sequel ==
In an interview David J. Stieve, when asked if he was working on new scripts, said,

Well, then you're treading into sequel territory. If there is any kind of scoop, it's not really a scoop but ... I can tell you and your readers that there is a definite idea for what's going to happen to Leslie Vernon next, that's been the goal all along. There are a lot of what-ifs, and things to have to happen right in this business for that to ever come to fruition, but certainly if there's going to be another horror movie coming from me, my biggest impulse, of course, is to relate what happens to Leslie next.

Baesel, when asked about the possibility of returning for a sequel to Behind the Mask, stated,

... there's a certain chance. I know that ideas have already been circulating around Scott and David's heads and I'd love to take Leslie on again. However, I don't think we'd undertake a sequel unless the script is as good or better than Behind the Mask. The first was so good it would be pissing on Leslie's legacy to set out with anything less than inspired ... and Leslie would never have that.

In early 2017, director Scott Glosserman explained that the script for the sequel had become a little dated due to the changes in horror over the intervening years.

The script itself captures that mid-aughts period, in the midst of the torture porn/found footage genres. It had a lot of interesting things to say. Today, that script, that film, is almost like a period piece because I don't necessarily want to bring it up to current day, and yet, certain things may feel a little bit old or period, depending on how you look at it. I think we captured the essence of what was happening several years ago. If we do get the opportunity to make the film, I'm not sure I'd want to make the screenplay any more current. It's a little bit of a conundrum.

In April 2026, it was announced that the sequel was officially underway, titled Behind the Mask II: The Return of Leslie Vernon.

== In popular culture ==
The song "Rise," by horror-based metal artist Carlyle Hearse, is based on this film. The song also features Angela Goethals, who starred in the film.
