= Scott Glosserman =

American film director

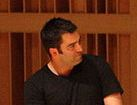
- Occupation: Film director

Scott Glosserman is an American film director.

== Filmography ==
Year	Film	Role
2001	No Escape: Prison Rape	Associate producer
2006	Behind the Mask: The Rise of Leslie Vernon	Director
2010	Truth in Numbers? Everything, According to Wikipedia	Director
2011	The Truth Below	Director

== Awards and nominations ==
Year	Award	Organization	Work	Category	Result
2006	Best European/North - South American Film	Fant-Asia Film Festival	Behind the Mask: The Rise of Leslie Vernon	Golden Prize	Won
2006	L’Écran Fantastique Award	Fant-Asia Film Festival	Behind the Mask: The Rise of Leslie Vernon	Golden Prize	Won
2006	Séquences Award	Séquences magazine	Behind the Mask: The Rise of Leslie Vernon	Jury Prize	Won
2006	Audience Award	Gen Art	Behind the Mask: The Rise of Leslie Vernon	Gen Art Film Festival	Won
2006	Carnet Jove - Special Mention	Sitges - Catalan International Film Festival	Behind the Mask: The Rise of Leslie Vernon	Midnight X-Treme	Won
2006	Audience Choice Award For Best Feature Film	Toronto After Dark Film Festival	Behind the Mask: The Rise of Leslie Vernon	Best Film	Won
