= Bears Will Be Bears =

- Grimm episode
- Episode no.: Season 1 Episode 2
- Directed by: Norberto Barba
- Written by: David Greenwalt; Jim Kouf
- Cinematography by: Cort Fey
- Editing by: Chris Willingham
- Production code: 102
- Original air date: November 4, 2011
- Running time: 43 minutes

Guest appearances
- Currie Graham as Frank Rabe; Amy Gumenick as Gilda Darner; Claire Coffee as Adalind Schade; Parker Bagley as Barry Rabe; Ayanna Berkshire as Rose; Alexander Mendeluk as Rocky; Kate Burton as Marie Kessler

Episode chronology
← Previous "Pilot"	Next → "Beeware"
- Grimm season 1

"Bears Will Be Bears" is the 2nd episode of the supernatural drama television series Grimm of season 1, which premiered on November 4, 2011, on NBC. The episode was written by series creators David Greenwalt and Jim Kouf, and was directed by Norberto Barba.

== Plot ==
Opening quote: "She looked in the window, and then peeped through the keyhole; seeing nobody in the house, she lifted the latch".

A young couple, later identified as Rocky and Gilda (Alexander Mendeluk and Amy Gumenick) break into a house, which they explore before engaging in foreplay. The house-owner arrives and they attempt to flee. Rocky is caught, but Gilda reaches the car and drives off. In hospital, Nick (David Giuntoli) is treated after being attacked (in the previous episode) by the mysterious woman (Claire Coffee) with a neurotoxin identified as PhTx3. Watching a surveillance videotape with Hank (Russell Hornsby) and Captain Renard (Sasha Roiz), he spots the woman, but they can't identify her. He and Hank interview Amy and head to the house. Sergeant Drew Wu (Reggie Lee) is already there, because the owners, Frank (Currie Graham) and Diane Rabe, had reported a break-in. Rocky is revealed to be held in a cave by a creature.

Nick and Hank interrogate Gilda, who admits she and Rocky snuck into the house. Marie (Kate Burton) calls Nick, asking him to visit her, where she tells him of an organization whose aim is to kill all the remaining Grimms. She urges him not to let them get into the trailer. Nick returns to the Rabe house, where he observes the Rabes' son, Barry (Parker Bagley), momentarily shift into his creature form.

Under a bridge, Renard meets with the mystery woman from the previous episode. He tells her he's had to put guards on her hospital room but suggests they find the right "people" to "take care of her" as they can't afford someone shifting & revealing their plan. Renard admits that they can't afford her to tell Nick any more about their family history & that they need him "in their side". Soon after they're approached by a thug, who the mystery woman then shifts form & kills.

In Marie's trailer, Nick discovers a bear claw very similar to one on display at the Rabes' home. He visits Monroe (Silas Weir Mitchell), who tells him it is a Jägerbär claw, called a "roh-hatz", that's used to ritually disembowel victims. Renard, in order to facilitate a second attempt to kill Marie, removes Marie's protective custody. Nick asks a reluctant Monroe to watch over her.

Gilda is released and heads to the Rabes' home, thinking they have Rocky. As she threatens Diane, she's knocked unconscious by Barry in his Jägerbär form. Nick confronts them, acknowledging he knows that they are Jägerbär and that Barry and his friends plan to kill Rocky for their ritual. Frank leads Nick to the cave, while Hank discovers Gilda's car hidden in the forest. Monroe confronts Marie about the killing of his grandfather by Grimms. He is attacked by two men sent to kill Marie, but manages to defeat them in his Blutbad form.

Frank and Nick arrive at the cave but it is empty; the ritual hunt has begun. Gilda and Rocky are running from the boys; Nick stalls them and they watch as Diane (in the shape of a bear) falls into a spike pit the boys built. Barry, his friends, Rocky, and Gilda are all arrested. A man tries to kill Marie in the hospital but she gets control of the scalpel and stabs him. Nick arrives and Marie dies in his arms. The episode ends as Nick and Juliette (Bitsie Tulloch) visit Marie's grave, while a creature watches them from hiding.

== Reception ==
=== Viewers ===
The episode was viewed by 6.01 million people, earning a 1.8/6 in the 18-49 rating demographics on the Nielson ratings scale, marking an 8% decrease in viewership and ranking first in its timeslot and second for the night, behind Blue Bloods. This means that 1.8 percent of all households with televisions watched the episode, while 6 percent of all households watching television at that time watched it.

=== Critical reviews ===
"Bears Will Be Bears" received positive reviews. Amy Ratcliffe of IGN gave the episode a "great" 8.5 out of 10 and wrote "If these initial episodes are any indication, the show will put a modern spin on a classic fairy tale each week. The procedural aspect makes the creatures feel more like supernatural occurrences than bedtime stories, but it works. The translation isn't heavy-handed either. By that, I mean they don't slap you in the face with the fairy tale hints. They embed signs and symbols into the story, and you can tell which story they're interpreting. It's so enjoyable that I will forgive them for the unfortunate choice of Papyrus font in the opening scene."

The A.V. Club's Kevin McFarland gave the episode a "B−" grade and wrote, "That the mounting pressure doesn't show in this second episode is a relief, because tonight I thought Grimm managed to use its case of the week to start an interesting conversation about family tradition, and was a slight uptick from last week's premiere. Mostly it has the last half of the episode to thank for that, where an influx of Silas Weir Mitchell helped the plot threads with Aunt Marie and the police chief move along with Nick and Hank’s case."

Nick McHatton from TV Fanatic, gave a 3.9 star rating out of 5, stating: "'Bears Will Be Bears' did show some improvement over the premiere, allaying some of my frustrations with the pilot, and even adding some rather deep themes of family versus cultural values and when is it time to move away from them, if ever. That type of weekly theme feels almost necessary in a show like Grimm since it’s based on fairy tales – we're all supposed to learn something from them, right?" Melissa Maerz of EW stated: "Mama bear must be proud. This week's episode, 'Bears Will Be Bears,' was a clever twist on Goldilocks and the Three Bears that explored the tension between cultural values and family values. Nick's forced to answer the question: What happens when one is at odds with the other?"
