= Kinect Star Wars =

2012 video game

- European cover art
- Developer: Terminal Reality
- Publishers: LucasArts; Microsoft Studios
- Producer: Craig Derrick
- Composers: Gordy Haab; Kyle Newmaster
- Series: Star Wars
- Platform: Xbox 360
- Release: WW: April 3, 2012
- Genre: Action
- Modes: Single-player, multiplayer

Kinect Star Wars is a 2012 Star Wars video game developed by Terminal Reality and published by LucasArts and Microsoft Studios for the Xbox 360 that uses the Kinect motion peripheral. The game features four game modes: "Jedi Destiny", the primary game mode; podracing; Rancor Rampage; and Galactic Dance-off. In Jedi Destiny, players assume the role models of Jedi Padawans as they wield their lightsabers and use the Force to attack enemies mostly from the prequel trilogy using gestures. Podracing is a race-based game mode, Rancor Rampage is a destruction-based game mode, and Galactic Dance-off is a dance-based game mode similar to the Dance Central series.

Microsoft Studios had planned to make a Star Wars game that utilizes the Kinect since the early development of the motion-sensing system. The game was formally announced at E3 2011 and released worldwide on April 3, 2012. It was the last game to be published by LucasArts before The Walt Disney Company halted all internal development at the company a year later. Craig Derrick served as lead producer on the game. Kinect Star Wars received generally mixed reviews.

== Gameplay ==
Kinect Star Wars features four subgames. In its primary mode, known as Jedi Destiny: Dark Side Rising, players take control of one of multiple Jedi Padawans. Using the Kinect, the player uses their hands to wield a lightsaber in combat. Players also can lift and throw objects with the Force using specific gestures. The story takes place during the prequel trilogy timeline of the Star Wars universe, beginning shortly after Star Wars: Episode I – The Phantom Menace and concluding with the events of Star Wars: Episode III – Revenge of the Sith. Body movement to control vehicles in specific sections of this mode. A second Jedi-centric mode, Duels of Fate, allows players to experience one-on-one duels with characters from the Jedi Destiny campaign as well as famous Star Wars villains such as Darth Vader.

The game's podracing utilizes the Kinect to simulate the dual throttle controls on podracers. Players extend arms fully to operate at full speed, and retract their arm to throttle back on one or both engines. Multiple courses are offered. Rancor Rampage, the game's third mode, allows players to control one of multiple species of rancor which are let loose in various Star Wars locales. Arm movements synchronize between the player and their rancor, and players can execute special attacks in this destruction-based game mode.

The final game mode in Kinect Star Wars is Galactic Dance-off. Here players control one of several famous Star Wars characters through the use of the Kinect. This game mode is similar to the Dance Central and Just Dance franchises in which players must dance in synchronization with the on-screen character. Cues to upcoming dance moves are shown to the player to ensure they can stay in synchronization with the character. The song selection consists of parodies with title and lyrics rewritten in a Star Wars theme. For example, Gwen Stefani's "Hollaback Girl" is rewritten as "Hologram Girl", and Village People's "Y.M.C.A." is rewritten as "Empire Today", while Jason Derulo's "Ridin' Solo" is rewritten as "I'm Han Solo". Dance locales are themed to the character and a particular moment for them in the Star Wars saga story; for example, Princess Leia's dance takes place in front of Jabba the Hutt, and Han Solo's dance takes place in the carbon-freezing chamber on Bespin.

== Development and release ==
Microsoft Studios had planned to develop a Star Wars game since early in the development of the Kinect system. Kudo Tsunoda, creative director for Kinect, said of this decision: "It's one of those things where you can see how the unique parts of Kinect can bring to life the fantasy of being a Jedi in a way no other game console or media can do." The release of the game was formally announced at the Electronic Entertainment Expo on June 6, 2011, where the first gameplay trailer and portions of the game were shown. A social media application was released for iOS, Android, and Windows Phone mobile devices. It combined Twitter and Facebook feeds on the game in the style of the Star Wars opening crawl.

Craig Derrick was LucasArts' lead producer on Kinect Star Wars. The visuals of the animation were augmented in such a way to make the Jedi fighting techniques appear realistic because according to Derrick "What we found early in development is that no one wants to look like 'Star Wars kid' in front of their friends." It was the last game to be published by LucasArts.

Five individual downloadable content pieces are available. The first, a podracer piloted by an adult Anakin Skywalker, is only available through a promotion with Brisk. Select bottles of iced tea feature a Microsoft M-Tag barcode which can be scanned by the Kinect to unlock the podracer. The remaining four consist of playable characters in different modes: a Snow Rancor, a Korriban Rancor, bounty hunter Aurra Sing and Jedi Master Kit Fisto. It was released worldwide on April 3, 2012. A limited-edition console bundle was launched alongside the game with the Xbox 360 S set designed to look like R2-D2 with a blue ring of light. The bundle included the console with a 320 GB hard drive, a white Kinect sensor and the gold wireless Xbox 360 controller modeled after C-3PO. The bundle was sold for a MRP of $449.99 in the United States and £349.99 in the United Kingdom and is the first custom Xbox 360 bundle to be released.

== Reception ==
Reception

Aggregate score
Aggregator	Score
Metacritic	55/100

Review scores
Publication	Score
G4	3/5
GameSpot	5/10
GamesRadar+	3.5/5
Giant Bomb	2/5
IGN	5.5/10
Polygon	4/10
Digital Spy	4/5

Kinect Star Wars's Galactic Dance-off mode was the subject of both praise and criticism from reviewers.

Kinect Star Wars received "mixed or average" reviews, according to review aggregator website Metacritic. It appeared on multiple lists of the worst Star Wars games ever developed.

Anthony Gallegos of IGN felt that the game was simply a collection of minigames instead of the larger "Jedi epic fans are dying for." Meanwhile, Liam Martin of Digital Spy maintained that there was a strong sense of effort from the developer, and to simply "call Kinect Star Wars a mini-game compilation would be to do it a disservice." Martin praised the game's setting, which is narrated by R2-D2 and C-3PO. He did concede, however, that certain elements of the game's controls were unresponsive at times, and that this could cause frustrations to players. Jonathan Deesing of G4 gave the game's Rancor Rampage and Galactic Dance-off modes high marks. He stated that some modes might feel tiresome to players, and noted that, during his time playing the podracing mode, he would sit in a chair to minimize fatigue and to feel further immersed. He, however, criticized the game's graphics for resembling that of a Wii game. In a more critical review Brad Shoemaker from Giant Bomb stated, "It doesn't matter who you claim Kinect Star Wars is for, it's a shoddy product on almost every level".

Lorenzo Veloria of GamesRadar praised the game for seldom having to repeat a move (e.g. a kick and a lightsaber slash) to make the action work and making one of the best uses of the Kinect in an action game. Justin McElroy of Polygon criticized the Jedi Destiny mode for imprecise blocking controls, the repetitive combat formula, and limited strategy. Mark Walton of GameSpot praised the Galactic Dance-off mode for being "silly" and "comical fun", but criticized the lightsaber duels for being slow-paced and the storyline for being a derivative of the original trilogy. The "I'm Han Solo" routine in the Galactic Dance-off mode was considered an absurd addition to the game.

Kinect Star Wars debuted at number one on the UK All Formats Chart, making it the first Kinect-exclusive game to do so in the UK. It was also the first Star Wars game to top the charts since 2008.
