= Beeware =

- Grimm episode
- Episode no.: Season 1 Episode 3
- Directed by: Darnell Martin
- Written by: Cameron Litvack; Thania St. John
- Cinematography by: Cort Fey
- Editing by: Jacque Toberen
- Production code: 103
- Original air date: November 11, 2011
- Running time: 43 minutes

Guest appearances
- Nana Visitor as Melissa Wincroft; Claire Coffee as Adalind Schade; Sharon Sachs as Harper

Episode chronology
← Previous "Bears Will Be Bears"	Next → "Lonelyhearts"
- Grimm season 1

"Beeware" is the 3rd episode of the supernatural drama television series Grimm of season 1, which premiered on November 11, 2011, on NBC. The episode was written by producer Cameron Litvack and consulting producer Thania St. John, and was directed by Darnell Martin.

== Plot ==
Opening quote: "She'll sting you one day. Oh, ever so gently, so you hardly even feel it. 'Til you fall dead."

In a streetcar, a man turns on a boombox and plays the song Y.M.C.A., prompting the passengers to dance. When everyone has left the streetcar, the driver discovers a woman, Serena Dunbrook, dead inside. Nick (David Giuntoli) and Hank (Russell Hornsby) respond to the scene to investigate. It turns out she died from anaphylactic shock in response to bee venom. They deduce the attacker seized the chance to kill her.

At the station, they interview 22 people who boarded the streetcar, all of whom say they were told to be on that streetcar at a certain time. During the interrogation, Nick realizes that two of them, Doug Shellow and John Coleman, are Mellifers. He and Hank follow them to a factory, where they meet with a woman (Nana Visitor). Nick and Hank are then attacked by a swarm of bees. Hank is wounded and is treated by Juliette (Bitsie Tulloch). Nick and Monroe (Silas Weir Mitchell) head back to the warehouse, where they discover an envelope addressed to the woman: Melissa Wincroft. They go to her mansion, which they discover is deserted but filled with dead bees and hives.

Captain Renard (Sasha Roiz) calls Nick and Hank to another crime scene, where Camilla Gotleib, Serena's co-worker at a law firm, has been killed. They contact a third attorney, Adalind Schade (Claire Coffee): Nick recognizes her as the woman who attacked him in the hospital, but remains silent. Forensics show that both victims had a mark below their tongue, enabling Nick to identify them as Hexenbiests. Nick interrogates Shellow again, after which Shellow sends a message alerting Melissa to target Adalind.

Nick and Hank take Adalind to a hotel. Once alone, Nick confronts her about her Hexenbiest form. A swarm of bees invades the hotel looking for Adalind, who flees to the basement. Nick finds Melissa also in the basement. She warns him he must kill Adalind as "something bad is coming". Adalind attacks Melissa and both implore Nick to kill the other. Hank arrives and sees Adalind in distress, and in a moment of decision, Nick shoots Melissa. She warns Nick that "he" is coming for him before dying. The episode ends as a bee stings Nick in his house.

== Production ==
The episode was dedicated to Clay Green Cambern, an assistant editor who died from a heart attack on November 8, 3 days before the episode aired.

== Reception ==
=== Viewers ===
The episode was viewed by 5.18 million people, earning a 1.6/5 in the 18-49 rating demographics on the Nielson ratings scale, marking a 14% decrease in viewership and ranking second in its timeslot and third for the night in the 18-49 demographics, behind Blue Bloods and CSI: NY. This means that 1.6 percent of all households with televisions watched the episode, while 5 percent of all households watching television at that time watched it.

=== Critical reviews ===
"Beeware" received mixed-to-positive reviews. Amy Ratcliffe of IGN gave the episode a "okay" 6.5 out of 10 and wrote "It's a series that lends itself to formula, and they seem to get and embrace it. It's not a bad thing, but it's not remarkable either. I'd like to see even more of the supernatural aspect because that's what differentiates Grimm from every other procedural on television. Small hints of mythology and clues about a bigger plot point were dropped in, but I still need more. I'm entertained, but I want to be enthralled."

The A.V. Club's Kevin McFarland gave the episode a "B" grade and wrote, "The opening quote on the title card comes from the 1955 Joan Crawford film Queen Bee, a veiled reference to the more obscure Brother's Grimm tale of the same name. The very idea of bee people seemed rather ludicrous within the scope of the fairy tale setting, but 'Beeware' overcome a terrible pun in its title to not only come up with the best and tightest episode of the show yet, but expand the larger mythology in such a way that set up some bigger arcs for the rest of the season."

Nick McHatton from TV Fanatic, gave a 3.8 star rating out of 5, stating: "All lame jokes and flash mobs aside, this episode did provide some much-needed conspiracy that was absent last week, shedding some light on Adalind and Captain Renard. Although, I wish a little more was laid out than what we saw here. Overall, 'Beeware' was another enjoyable episode, and who doesn't enjoy a good flash mob? I just wish some things were progressing along a little faster and smoother."
