= Liars All =

- Directed by: Brian Brightly
- Written by: Brian Brightly
- Produced by: Jeffrey Allard; Alex Sagalchik; Joey Carey; Stefan Nowicki
- Starring: Matt Lanter; Sara Paxton; Gillian Zinser; Randy Wayne; Darin Brooks; Henry Hereford
- Cinematography: Paul Sadourian
- Production companies: Indie Entertainment; Mott Street Pictures; Sundial Pictures
- Distributed by: Pinnacle Films (Australia); DLN Films (United Kingdom)
- Release dates: March 6, 2013 (Japan); August 6, 2013 (United States)
- Running time: 96 minutes
- Country: United States
- Language: English

Liars All is a 2013 American psychological thriller film. It was directed and written by Brian Brightly, and stars Matt Lanter, Sara Paxton, Gillian Zinser, and Torrance Coombs.

This psychological thriller finds a college group of friends playing Truth or Dare on New Year's Eve in London. A pop singer, Casey, (Stephanie McIntosh) is dating Dennis, (Torrance Coombs) a ladies' man and soccer star. Dennis' former girlfriend, Missy, (Gillian Zinser) is a psycho stalker. Mike (Matt Lanter) loves Missy but she only sees him as a friend. During the game we learn background about the players, like Mike and Katie (Sara Paxton) were first loves.

With booze, drugs, sex, video cameras, guns and untold relationships, the game gets out of control and Missy gets killed. At the police station, everyone tells their own different version of what happened. Was the killing an accident, suicide, or murder? The "who done it" has a surprise ending.

== Plot ==
Set in the bustling city of London, popular football player Dennis Hogue is engaged to pop sensation Casey Kass, which sends his ex-girlfriend Missy into an angry spiral.

It is New Year's Eve and Missy has invited her friends Mike and Katie from Los Angeles to join her to celebrate, starting out at the bar where Missy works. At the bar she sees Dennis with his teammate Billy, and later, meet others friends. They all decide to go back to Dennis' place for an after-party. Hours pass and Missy is found dead by a gunshot wound.

London detective, Sandra is called in to interrogate the witnesses and suspects to get to the bottom of what really happened. She interrogates Mike:

Mike arrives with the rest of the group to the apartment sees Missy already there, where she asks them to play an amped up game of Truth or Dare with make-shift playing cards that were passed down from her grandmother to her mother (who committed suicide by shooting herself in the neck). The game starts off mostly innocent enough and they confess their dark (and often embarrassing) secrets. Dennis is given the dare card and he is instructed by Missy to steal something from a stranger. He rejects it at first, not wanting to harm his career, but is quickly swayed into going along with it.

Mike offers to go with him and suggests they bring Missy along as to not draw suspicion to themselves. The whole group leaves Dennis' apartment and find a hotel nearby. Dennis, Mike and Missy climb up a fires escape into the hotel while the rest stay behind and Mike takes his video camera along. Dennis uses a crowbar to break into the first room he sees but shortly after entering, Missy takes out a concealed gun and points it at Dennis. She forces him to surrender his cellphone and plans to call Casey and tell her about the pregnancy she had that Dennis talked her into getting rid of. She calls Casey but Dennis attempts to grab the gun away from Missy and a struggle ensues. Moments later, Mike rushes to the balcony and tells his friends that Dennis has shot Missy dead.

Mike tells the detective that Dennis killed her in order to protect his blossoming football career and his relationship with Casey. Sandra is reluctant to believe him, as Katie tells her that Mike was obsessively in-love with Missy but never returned the feelings.

Katie recalls the events of the party and how she asked Mike to rekindle the brief romance they had years ago but he rejected her as he always held out hope Missy would love him back. Katie in anger almost sleeps with Dennis who wanted to get with her in order to make Mike jealous but turns him down after a brief kiss.

Sandra interrogates Dennis who says that Missy's death was an accident. Mike had pulled out the gun on Dennis in the hotel after conspiring with Missy to reveal the pregnancy to Casey, but Dennis grabs onto Missy and threatens Mike into putting the gun down. Mike lunges towards Dennis to try and free Missy but he unintentionally pulls the trigger and Missy is shot in the neck and bleeds out.

One thing Sandra can't help but think about is the fact that Mike had recorded most of the events that night but for some reason, never recorded the incident in the hotel. Katie insists he was always filming, especially when he was around Missy. Sandra is not sure whom to believe and gathers all of the witnesses together in one room, she asks Mike again if there was video footage from the hotel room but he reiterates that he did not film any. She then tells them the truth about Missy's past, that there was no abortion, only a miscarriage. Missy's mother was institutionalised for most of her life and Missy herself also suffered from bipolar disorder and suicidal tendencies. Therefore, Sandra determines that Missy took them to the hotel that night to kill herself in front of Dennis as revenge. She left his football jersey behind as evidence to frame him and she knew Mike would go along with it to make Dennis suffer.

Sandra shows the entire group Missy's dead body in order to put across the severity of what happened to her and allows them all to leave. She keeps Mike behind for a moment to give him the card-game box that belonged to Missy. Mike, saddened by the death of Missy gives the box to Katie to take, who plans to go travelling by herself to clear her head.

Later, as Katie is set to depart, she looks inside the box and notices a tear in the fabric bottom. She finds a video camera memory card tucked inside which contains the missing footage from the night in the hotel room.

In the footage, Missy held up the gun to Dennis and threatens to call Casey and tell her the truth about their relationship but is double crossed by Mike who takes the gun from her. He grabs onto her and tells Missy he is tired of helping her constantly only for her to choose Dennis every time. Dennis says "game over" to Missy and pulls the trigger while the gun is in Mike's hand, killing her.

Mike is distraught over Missy's death and the plan was only to scare her but Dennis took it too far. He tells Mike to say it was a suicide but he refuses, grabs the camera and runs to hide the footage and therefore conceal his part in her death.

== Cast ==
- Matt Lanter as Mike
- Sara Paxton as Katie
- Gillian Zinser as Missy
- Randy Wayne as Jack
- Darin Brooks as Brax
- Alice Evans as Sandra
- Torrance Coombs as Dennis
- Tiffany Mulheron as Angie
- Stephanie McIntosh as Casey Kass
- Henry Hereford as Constable Peter Franks

== Production ==
Filming commenced on April 18, 2011 in Los Angeles. Matt Lanter revealed in a recent interview that his character, Mike, will be "pining after one girl (Gillian Zinser) and this other girl is pining after me (Sara Paxton) It’s like this whole web of desire. It always creates tension and drama."

== Reception ==
On Rotten Tomatoes, a review aggregator the film holds a 22% liked it rating, with an average rating of 2.3/5 based on 216 user raters.
