= JLouis Mills =

American actor

JLouis Mills is an American actor best known for the television series Heartbeat.

In 2013, Mills lost vision in one eye which soon became discolored, causing him to wear an eyepatch. Before landing his role on Heartbeat, Mills worked as a caretaker and was homeless for a time.

Mills is also known for such films as The Tribe and The ABCs of Death.
