= Gillian Zinser =

American actress (active 2009-)

- Born: Washington, D.C., USA
- Occupation: Actress
- Years active: 2009–present
- Website: gillianzinser.net

Gillian Zinser is an American actress. She is best known for her role as Ivy Sullivan on The CW teen drama series 90210.

== Early life ==
Zinser was born in Washington, D.C. She is of German and Ashkenazi Jewish descent. Her father was born in Berlin. She attended the New York University, based in Manhattan.

== Career ==
Zinser's first appearance on television was in 2009 in an episode of the Cupid. She also made an appearance in the Cold Case series before joining the cast of 90210, where she played the role of Ivy Sullivan, a 17-year-old high school girl who struggles to get what she wants and who practices surfing at a high level.

In 2011, Zinser appeared in her first feature film, The Truth Below, a television film for MTV. She also joined the cast for the thriller Liars All, alongside Matt Lanter and Sara Paxton. In May 2012, Gillian announced that she was leaving the 90210 series. She also made an appearance in the Oliver Stone film, Savages.

== Personal life ==
She once was in a relationship with Luke Grimes.

== Filmography ==
Film roles
| Year | Title | Role | Notes |
|---|---|---|---|
| 2010 | The Truth Below | Jenna | |
| 2011 | Ecstasy | Amanda Crawford | |
| 2011 | Hail Mary | Elodie | |
| 2012 | Savages | Beach Girl | |
| 2013 | Liars All | Missy | |
| 2014 | Asthma | Kara | |
| 2015 | Worthy | Mara | |
| 2015 | Two Wrongs | Sarah Harris | |
| 2015 | End of Babes | Elly | |
| 2016 | Halfway | Eliza | |
| 2017 | Band Aid | Sheena | |
| 2020 | Holy New York | Rose | |
| 2021 | The Guilty | Jess Baylor (voice) | |
| 2022 | Smile | Holly | |

Television roles
| Year | Title | Role | Notes |
|---|---|---|---|
| 2009 | Cupid | Beatnik | Episode: "The Great Right Hope" |
| 2009 | Cold Case | Vonda Martin | Episode: "Hood Rats" |
| 2009–2012 | 90210 | Ivy Sullivan | Recurring role (season 2); main role (seasons 3–4) |
| 2010 | Southland | Chloe Sherman | Episode: "Butch & Sundance" |
| 2018 | Blindspot | Eve | Episode: "Case: Sun, Moon, and the Truth" |
| 2019 | Stumptown | Coach Mary Jane 'MJ' Glenway | Episode: "Dex Education" |
| 2023 | I'm a Virgo | Sasha | Episode: "It Requires Trust on My Part" |
