= White Irish Drinkers =

- Film poster
- Directed by: John Gray
- Written by: John Gray
- Produced by: John Gray; Paul F. Bernard; Melissa Jo Peltier; James Scura
- Starring: Nick Thurston; Geoffrey Wigdor
- Cinematography: Seamus Tierney
- Edited by: Neil Mandelberg
- Music by: Mark Snow; The Shillaly Brothers; Michael Campagna & The Average Johnsons
- Production company: Annus Mirabilis
- Distributed by: Screen Media Films
- Release dates: September 13, 2010 (Toronto International Film Festival); March 25, 2011 (United States)
- Running time: 109 minutes
- Country: United States
- Language: English
- Box office: $31,056

White Irish Drinkers is a 2010 American drama film written and directed by John Gray and starring Nick Thurston and Geoffrey Wigdor.

== Premise ==
Brooklyn, 1975: brothers Brian and Danny Leary are looking for a way out of their working-class neighborhood, so they make a pact to rob a local theater on the night of a Rolling Stones concert.

== Cast ==
- Nick Thurston as Brian Leary
- Regan Mizrahi as Young Brian Leary
- Geoffrey Wigdor as Danny Leary
- Anthony Amorim as Young Danny Leary
- Stephen Lang as Patrick Leary
- Karen Allen as Margaret Leary
- Peter Riegert as Whitey
- Zachary Booth as Todd McKay
- Leslie Murphy as Shauna
- Robbie Sublett as Ray (as Robbie Collier Sublett)
- Michael Drayer as Dennis
- Henry Zebrowski as Jerry
- Ken Jennings as Jimmy Cheeks
- Jackie Martling as Cop
- Jimmy Palumbo as Jimmy

== Release and reception ==
White Irish Drinkers film premiered at the 2010 Toronto International Film Festival and was later picked up for distribution by Screen Media Films. The film was theatrically released on March 26, 2011.

Since premiering at Toronto, the film has won awards at the Manhattan, Chicago United, and Woodstock Film Festivals. The film was also a finalist for the Gotham Festival Genius Award.
