= The Truth Below =

2011 thriller teen television film by Scott Glosserman

- Film poster
- Written by: Wendy Diane Miller
- Directed by: Scott Glosserman
- Starring: Gillian Zinser; Nick Thurston; Ricky Mabe; Reid Ewing; Shaun Johnston; Barbara Gates Wilson
- Music by: Gordy Haab
- Country of origin: United States
- Original language: English

Production
- Executive producers: Maggie Malina; Chris Linn
- Producers: Scott Glosserman; Chad Oaks; Mike Frislev
- Cinematography: Jaron Presant
- Editor: Bridget Durnford
- Running time: 85 minutes

Original release
- Network: MTV
- Release: June 16, 2011

The Truth Below is a thriller teen television film directed by Scott Glosserman and starring Gillian Zinser, Nick Thurston, Ricky Mabe, and Reid Ewing.

The film, which was developed by Glen Echo Entertainment and produced in Calgary, Alberta, by Nomadic Pictures, was written by Wendy Diane Miller. Filming began in April 2010. The film's distributor is MTV Networks.

The film heavily features music from American pop-punk band A Day To Remember.

== Plot ==
Four college students, Ethan, Jenna, Dante and Liam, awaken in a hotel room. Dante opens the curtains to wake everyone up to discover all of the students have hangovers. Ethan gets in the shower while Liam gets coffee for the group. Jenna asks if Dante is still with his girlfriend and he confides that they had broken up a long time ago and that the girl he is into now has something going on with another guy. The group spends their last day at the ski resort then pack their bags to head home. On the way to the highway the group shares a joint but immediately put it out when they hear sirens and are pulled over. Jenna pulls her top down to try to get out of a ticket. The officer tells them that tires must be chained and that there is a gas station up the road where they can do it safely. At the gas station Ethan realizes they have forgotten their chains and Dante decides to go on without it. Dante gets directions from the cashier about a shortcut to the highway. Shortly after they are on the shortcut the car begins sliding and Dante loses all control. The car swerves off of the road and flips before stopping. An avalanche is triggered and buries the car in several feet of snow.

After regaining consciousness, the students discover that Ethan has dislocated his arm. They successfully put the arm back in place, but not before Jenna administers a mysterious pain medication to Ethan. After checking their surroundings and all hope of driving through the snow fails, Ethan suggests that they play "The Truth Game." The students begin revealing secrets. Ethan first reveals that he used to hold his sister's panties up and fantasize she was there, and how he intimidated a kid in Cub scouts and left him in the forest lost. He was later found but never confessed it was Ethan who did it. Liam then follows with telling he skipped his father's funeral, telling his mother he was throwing up. Dante reveals that he once stole $50 from his brother's bike fund, he claims his brother knew it was him, but he regrets how he let his little brother down. Jenna reveals that she was having sex with her chemistry teacher. Liam then reveals that he is a virgin. Jenna asked if he wants to have intercourse with her out of compassion so he would not die a virgin. Out of jealousy and anger, Dante admits that he is in love with Jenna, leaving her guilty. Liam later has an acute asthma attack, and the plot thickens when his original inhaler has expired. Ethan finds Liam's spare inhaler in his bag, but decides to hide it in his pocket as Liam takes his final breaths.

Dante and Jenna later discover the inhaler in Ethan's pocket. The inhaler was discovered in his pocket when Ethan tried to rape Jenna when she sought comfort in Ethan on the death of their friend, Dante stops him and attacks Ethan and in the scuffle. Ethan tosses Dante's wallet in the trunk area, where Jenna is still searching for Liam's inhaler, when she discovers a sexual picture of herself in Dante's wallet prompting Ethan to reveal the final secret of the movie; Jenna had been given alcoholic beverages spiked with Rufalin, where two college seniors and Ethan had taken her upstairs and taken suggestive photographs and later forced Ethan to leave the room, so the two seniors were left alone with Jenna.

Dante and Jenna decide to escape and to dig themselves out and leave Ethan in the buried car, unable to escape with them on account of his arm. Eventually, the car collapses with the pressure of the snow with Ethan in it. The police officers discover them after a trucker notices a snowboard vertical in the snow. The two teens stuck in the snow, Dante proclaims his love to Jenna. They are later found dead frozen together and are shown being taken away on stretchers.
