= Azura Skye =

American actress

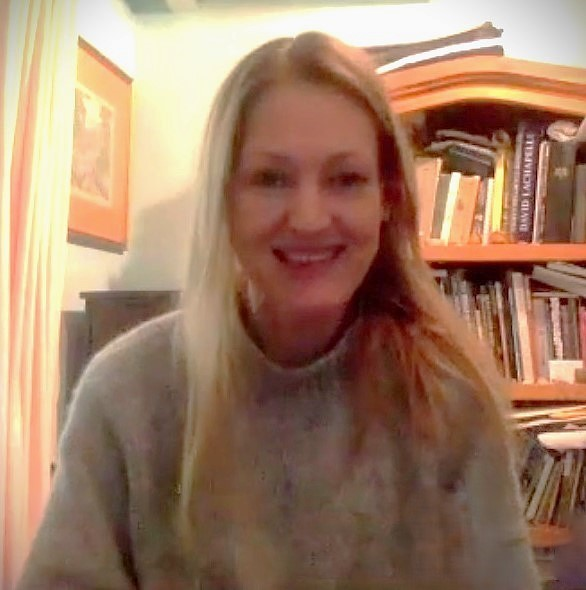
- Skye in 2020 on AMFM Studios
- Born: Northridge, Los Angeles, Los Angeles County, California, U.S.
- Occupation: Actress
- Years active: 1985–present
- Relatives: Brad Johnson (maternal grandfather)

Azura Skye (born November 8, 1981) is an American actress who first gained recognition for her role as Jane on The WB television sitcom Zoe, Duncan, Jack and Jane. She also had a 2-episode role as Cassie Newton in the seventh season of Buffy the Vampire Slayer.

== Early life ==
Being from a show business family, she started her career as a stage actress at the age of three and toured Europe with the Santa Monica Playhouse theatre group at the age of eleven. She received her education at the Brentwood School. Her grandfather, Brad Johnson, who died before her birth, was an actor known for his role as deputy sheriff Lofty Craig in the Western series, Annie Oakley (1954–1957), as well as a real estate developer in Los Angeles.

== Career ==
Skye made her first television appearance on the show Total Security in 1997. Then she played a couple of smaller parts on Touched by an Angel and Chicago Hope, and made appearances in a number of television movies before she was cast for the role as "Jane" in Zoe, Duncan, Jack and Jane in 1999. Zoe..., as the show was renamed for the second season, was a short-lived (two seasons) sitcom about four teenagers – Skye's character being one of them. In 2000, the same year that Zoe... ended, Skye's first major movie production premiered. In 28 Days, she starred alongside Sandra Bullock and Viggo Mortensen.

Two years later, in 2002, Skye appeared in two episodes of the television series Buffy the Vampire Slayer. In the episode "Help" she plays Cassie Newton, a teen girl at Sunnydale High who possesses the power of precognition and who foresees her own death, and whom Buffy tries to help. In the episode "Conversations with Dead People", she plays an incarnation of the First Evil, impersonating a ghost of Cassie, who attempts to persuade Willow to commit suicide by pretending to bring a message from her dead girlfriend Tara.

Also in 2002, she appeared in Confessions of an Ugly Stepsister alongside Matthew Goode and Stockard Channing.

During this time she also appeared in other projects, doing smaller parts. She has played Susie Keaton in four episodes of CSI: Miami and has made guest appearances in shows such as Smallville and Judging Amy. Skye has also played parts in movies like Bandits (with Bruce Willis and Cate Blanchett), The Salton Sea (with Val Kilmer) and Red Dragon (with Anthony Hopkins).

Skye appeared as Ruby Bates in the 2006 drama Heavens Fall. In 2007, she starred as Sara in 20 Years After and Casey Cola in What We Do Is Secret. In 2008, she had a major part in the American remake of the Japanese horror movie One Missed Call, which was released in the US on January 4, 2008.

Her most recent television appearances include the voice of Veronica in an episode of American Dad!, fall 2007 episodes of House M.D., Bones and Ghost Whisperer, a 2009 episode of The Mentalist, and Fiona in American Horror Story: Murder House.

== Filmography ==
Film
Year	Title	Role	Notes
1999	EDtv	Interview Teenager	
1999	Dementia	Veronica	
2000	28 Days	Andrea	
2001	Buck Naked Arson	Janey	
2001	Town & Country	Spider	
2001	Bandits	Cheri	
2002	Confessions of an Ugly Stepsister	Iris	
2002	The Salton Sea	Teresa	
2002	Red Dragon	Bookseller	
2003	Carolina	Georgia Mirabeau	
2005	The Wendell Baker Story	May	
2005	Sexual Life	Lorna	
2005	Why Don't You Dance?		Short film
2005	Laying Down Arms	Janet	Short film
2006	Wristcutters: A Love Story	Tania	
2006	Love and Debate	Nina	
2006	Heavens Fall	Ruby Bates	
2007	What We Do Is Secret	Casey Cola	
2007	God's Beach	Lydia	Short film
2008	One Missed Call	Leann Cole	
2008	20 Years After	Sarah	
2009	Two Other Dreams	Galen	Short film
2012	Least Among Saints	May	
2015	Take Me to the River	Ruth	
2018	Alien Code	Beth	
2020	The Swerve	Holly	

Television
Year	Title	Role	Notes
1997	Total Security	—N/a	Episode: "A Man for Half a Season"
1997	Touched by an Angel	China	Episode: "Children of the Night"
1997	Chicago Hope	Cashier	Episode: "Brain Salad Surgery"
1997	Alone	Jocelyn	Television film
1998	Cab to Canada	Jet (Runaway)	Television film
1998	Ghosts of Fear Street	Cricket	Television film
1999–2000	Zoe, Duncan, Jack and Jane	Jane Cooper	24 episodes
2000	Batman Beyond	Deanna Clay	Voice, episode: "Inqueling"
2001	Gideon's Crossing	Haley	Episode: "The Crash"
2002	Smallville	Amy Palmer	Episode: "Shimmer"
2002	Confessions of an Ugly Stepsister	Iris Fisher	Television film
2002	John Doe	Karen	Episode: "Unaired Pilot"
2002	Judging Amy	Rhonda Petty	Episode: "Lost in the System"
2002	Buffy the Vampire Slayer	Cassie Newton	2 episodes
2003	Expert Witness	—N/a	Television film
2003	The Handler	Amber	Episode: "Homewrecker's Ball"
2003–2005	CSI: Miami	Susie Barnam Keaton	4 episodes
2005	Missing	Marissa	Episode: "Have You Seen This Man?"
2006, 2011	American Dad!	Veronica, Cookie	Voice, 2 episodes
2006–2007	The Minor Accomplishments of Jackie Woodman	Skyler	8 episodes
2007	Mr. and Mrs. Smith	J	Episode: "Pilot"
2007	House	Irene	Episode: "Guardian Angels"
2007	Bones	Amber Kippler	Episode: "Mummy in the Maze"
2007	Ghost Whisperer	Sophie Owens	Episode: "Double Exposure"
2009	The Mentalist	Tamzin Dove / Sarah Jones	Episode: "Red Rum"
2009	Hawthorne	Mary Barth	Episode: "Yielding"
2010	Cold Case	Claire Shepard (1998)	Episode: "Bullet"
2011	American Horror Story: Murder House	Fiona	4 episodes
2012	Grimm	Robin Steinkellner	Episode: "The Thing with Feathers"
2014	Working the Engels	Sandy Engel-Karinsky	12 episodes
2017	Girls	Sharva Pontemucci	Episode: “Full Disclosure”
2018–2021	Riverdale	Darla Dickenson	5 episodes
2018	Speechless	Mary	Episode: "Celebrity Suite"
2019	Stumptown	Stephanie Houston	Episode: "Rip City Dicks"
2019–2020	Charmed	Helen McGaintry	2 episodes

Video games
Year	Title	Role	Notes
2011	Star Wars: The Old Republic	Ashara Zavros	
2013	Killzone: Shadow Fall	Dr. Hilary Massar	
