= The Three Bad Wolves =

- Grimm episode
- Episode no.: Season 1 Episode 6
- Directed by: Clark Mathis
- Written by: Naren Shankar; Sarah Goldfinger
- Cinematography by: Cort Fey
- Editing by: George Pilkinton
- Production code: 106
- Original air date: December 9, 2011
- Running time: 43 minutes

Guest appearances
- Brad William Henke as Hap Lasser; Jaime Ray Newman as Angelina Lasser; Daniel Roebuck as Orson

Episode chronology
← Previous "Danse Macabre"	Next → "Let Your Hair Down"
- Grimm season 1

"The Three Bad Wolves" is the 6th episode of the supernatural drama television series Grimm of season 1, which premiered on December 9, 2011, on NBC. The episode was written by executive producer Naren Shankar and co-executive producer Sarah Goldfinger, and was directed by Clark Mathis.

== Plot ==
Opening quote: "'Little pig, little pig, let me come in,' said the wolf to the pig. 'Not by the hair of my chinny chin chin,' said the pig to the wolf."

Hap Lasser (Brad William Henke), is working out with a Shake Weight when it slips and flies out through the window. As he goes to retrieve it, his house explodes. Nick (David Giuntoli) and Hank (Russell Hornsby) investigate, and Nick sees Hap shift into a Blutbad. Hap tells them his brother died in a similar fire the month before. Later, while they are interrogating Hap at the police station, Monroe (Silas Weir Mitchell) shows up: he is Hap's emergency contact.

Monroe takes Hap to his home. Nick passes by to check up on Hap and is attacked by Angelina (Jaime Ray Newman), Hap's sister and a former lover of Monroe. Monroe sends Nick away and he and Angelina go to the woods where they have sex. While they are gone, a pig-like creature appears at the house and kills Hap. Sgt. Wu (Reggie Lee) questions Angelina and tells Nick and Hank that she may be responsible for the death of arson investigator Orson's (Daniel Roebuck) brothers. Nick sees that Orson is a Bauerschwein. Monroe tells Nick that the Bauerschwein and the Blutbaden have a centuries-old feud.

Angelina arrives at the police station, looking for Orson, certain he killed Hap. She attacks an officer and escapes without finding Orson. Nick goes to Orson's house, where he says he has no interest in causing trouble with a Grimm. Angelina appears and attacks Orson. Nick manages to stop her but she disappears. Orson is taken to the hospital and arrested for the murders of Hap and his brother. The episode ends as Monroe investigates a noise and finds a smashed framed picture of Angelina's family on his porch.

== Reception ==
=== Viewers ===
The episode was broadcast on December 9. It was viewed by 5.43 million people, earning a 1.6/5 in the 18-49 rating demographics on the Nielson ratings scale, marking a 32% increase in viewership and ranking first in its timeslot and fourth for the night in the 18-49 demographics, behind Frosty Returns, Dateline NBC and Frosty the Snowman. This means that 1.6 percent of all households with televisions watched the episode, while 5 percent of all households watching television at that time watched it.

=== Critical reviews ===
"The Three Bad Wolves" received positive reviews. Amy Ratcliffe of IGN gave the episode a "great" 8.5 out of 10 and wrote "I hope Grimm brings more episodes like this one. The combination of the supernatural and procedural elements was just right, and the conflict felt legitimate. It was far superior to just another bizarre murder case. For the first time, I felt like I really connected with some of the characters (Nick and Monroe). More, please."

The A.V. Club's Kevin McFarland gave the episode a "B+" grade and wrote, "'Three Bad Wolves' was the fourth episode of Grimm in production order, so the fact that it was airing sixth made me a little nervous. I thought we wouldn't be getting much in terms of backstory, and pushing this hour back in the schedule isn't exactly a vote of confidence. Still, I couldn't help but feel optimistic, because all the previews featured Eddie Monroe and a murderous family feud between the Blutbaden and the Bowerswine, an unexpectedly clever take on 'The Three Little Pigs' tale. Instead of a weaker hour, this was perhaps the best episode of Grimm thus far, managing to bring some of the disparate unnecessary elements of the show into the central plot, a case of the week that included new characters and created a stronger bond between Nick and Eddie."

TV Overmind's Shilo Adams wrote, "'The Three Bad Wolves' was a solid but unremarkable installment of Grimm that was another stylistic shift in terms of look, tone, and approach to such an intriguing concept. The show has been a little frantic with its trips around the stylistic map, dabbling in camp, dark humor, just plain darkness, and now police procedural, with positives and negatives coming from each experiment in identity. Its venture in the world of true police dramas didn't make for the most exciting episode in the world thanks to the almost too straightforward presentation, but 'The Three Bad Wolves' did one thing extremely, extremely right. It gave Silas Weir Mitchell a very good showcase to expand his character and show us what's behind the neurotic, wry facade of Eddie Monroe, a man caught between the world of humanity and the call of the wild."

Nick McHatton from TV Fanatic, gave a 4.2 star rating out of 5, stating: "Finally! The Grimm Gods have bestowed us with an Eddie-centric episode in 'The Three Bad Wolves.' It certainly wasn't a disappointment, either, shining a spotlight on this character with very little need to deviate from the case of the week with unnecessary distractions. When the storytelling can layer this much in a procedural case, it gives me hope that the questions I'm asking will eventually get answered."
