= Off the Ledge =

- Directed by: Brooke Mikey Anderson (Brooke P. Anderson)
- Written by: Brooke Mikey Anderson; Dawn Higginbotham
- Starring: Brooke Mikey Anderson; Nathan Baesel; Maria Cina
- Release date: 2009
- Country: United States
- Language: English

Off the Ledge is a 2009 American comedy genre film set at a New Year's Eve party in Hollywood Hills.

== Cast ==
- Justin Whalin as Hopper Jackson
- Brooke Mikey Anderson as Kat
- Nathan Baesel as Boston
- Maria Cina
- Jenny Mollen as Amber-Elizabeth
- Anne Ramsay as Bonnie
- Nectar Rose as Carrie
- Carlee Avers
- Andrea De Oliveira
- Yan Feldman
- James Ferris
- Zosia Mamet
- Raymond O'Connor
