= Danse Macabre (Grimm) =

- Grimm episode
- Episode no.: Season 1 Episode 5
- Directed by: David Solomon
- Written by: David Greenwalt; Jim Kouf
- Cinematography by: Cort Fey
- Editing by: George Pilkinton
- Production code: 105
- Original air date: December 8, 2011
- Running time: 43 minutes

Guest appearances
- Claire Coffee as Adalind Schade; Nick Thurston as Roddy Geiger; Sharon Sachs as Dr. Harper; Judith Hoag as Mrs. Jessup; Amelia Rose Blair as Sarah Jennings; Russell Hodgkinson as Ephram Geiger

Episode chronology
← Previous "Lonelyhearts"	Next → "The Three Bad Wolves"
- Grimm season 1

"Danse Macabre" is the 5th episode of the supernatural drama television series Grimm of season 1, which premiered on December 8, 2011, on NBC. The episode was written by series creators David Greenwalt and Jim Kouf, and was directed by David Solomon. The episode was named for the symphonic poem Danse macabre, a piece of music played at several places in the episode by both the Reinigen Roddy Geiger and others.

== Plot ==
Opening quote: "Out they scampered from doors, windows and gutters, rats of every size, all after the piper."

DJ "Retchid Kat" performs at a rave. Meanwhile, music professor Paul Lawson is killed in his car when rats attack him. Nick (David Giuntoli) and Hank (Russell Hornsby) are sent to investigate and discover "Geiger Pest Control" cages hidden nearby, leading them to question if they brought the rats there. While questioning Lawson's students, they learn that one of Lawson's students, Roddy Geiger (Nick Thurston), had been suspended for bad behaviour. They question Roddy and his father, but the pair resist and are arrested. Nick finds out they are Reinigen. Sgt. Wu (Reggie Lee) finds out that Roddy is "Retchid Kat", and since he was at the rave the night Lawson died, he is released. An autopsy reveals that Lawson died from a heart attack before the rats could kill him.

Roddy meets with Sarah Jennings (Amelia Rose Blair), one of Lawson's students, and tells her that her friends placed the pest control cages to frame him and his dad for the murder. Meanwhile, Hank and Wu go to a bar, where Hank leaves Wu and talks to Adalind Schade (Claire Coffee), while Renard (Sasha Roiz) watches from his car. Nick sends Monroe (Silas Weir Mitchell) to talk to Roddy and encourage him to stay calm and develop his musical talents. Monroe thinks it went well, but after he leaves, Roddy is notified his father has been injured in jail after refusing to enter his cell. Roddy becomes enraged and starts trashing the place.

Roddy takes his DJ mask and leaves with the rats for a warehouse party. Sarah and her friends arrive and Roddy plays his violin to send the rats after them. Nick and Hank arrive in time to rescue them. They finally admit that they used the rats to intimidate Professor Lawson and to frame Roddy. Nick finds Roddy but lets him go. Nick and Hank decide to leave the case as there's no believable evidence for an arrest. The episode ends as a repairman (a disguised creature), arrives at Nick's home to retrieve his tools, which he had been using to repair the fridge. He is clearly frightened of Nick, which confuses Juliette (Bitsie Tulloch).

== Reception ==
=== Viewers ===
The episode was broadcast on Thursday December 8, instead of Friday. It was viewed by 4.09 million people, earning a 1.6/4 in the 18-49 rating demographics on the Nielson ratings scale, marking a 25% decrease in viewership and ranking second in its timeslot and twelfth for the night in the 18-49 demographics, behind Parks and Recreation, Whitney, America's Funniest Home Videos, Wipeout, Bones, The Mentalist, Person of Interest, The Office, The X Factor, Rules of Engagement and The Big Bang Theory. This means that 1.6 percent of all households with televisions watched the episode, while 4 percent of all households watching television at that time watched it.

=== Critical reviews ===
"Danse Macabre" received mixed-to-positive reviews. Amy Ratcliffe of IGN gave the episode a "okay" 6.0 out of 10 and wrote "I like this digging into traditional fairytales and turning them on their heads. It definitely makes me think about the darker side of all those familiar bedtime stories, but something is still off. I can't place it, but they're missing beats. I think Grimm is a bit like the kid who has infinite potential but can't seem to apply him/herself. It's still an entertaining show, but it could be so much more."

The A.V. Club's Kevin McFarland gave the episode a "B" grade and wrote, "Even though I'm warming up to Grimm and laughing at some nice one-liners while I enjoy the fairy tale retellings, those big questions from the pilot are still floating somewhere in the back of my mind. Personally, I find it easy to disregard the overarching questions when Nick and Hank are investigating a case on their own, or whenever Eddie Monroe shows up. But whenever Captain Renard slinks in (and he was in the background of a few scenes tonight), it always highlights that there is a glass ceiling on this show that feels impenetrable at the moment because the show continues to ignore the lingering big questions inherent in the premise and pilot episode. No matter how compellingly the fractured fairy tales unfold, there was a lot of backstory in that first hour that has only reappeared in flashes. 'Beeware,' the best episode of the series so far, managed to tell a story related to the creature world Nick was discovering while he and Hank investigated a case, but no other episode has struck the right blend since."

TV Overmind's Shilo Adams wrote, "When talking about Grimm's last original episode (which aired in mid-November), I mentioned how badly I wanted the show to fully embrace its dark side, which features a lot of horror movie instincts. What has made Grimm such an interesting show to watch is how visually distinctive it is from (almost) everything else on TV and the show really asserts itself as something different when it piles on the dingy lighting, unique make-up/CGI, and intricately creepy details that keep its other worldly feel alive and kickin'. Simply, allowing Grimm to become a sort-of monster-movie-of-the-week could make for some fun TV."

Nick McHatton from TV Fanatic, gave a 3.9 star rating out of 5, stating: "After what feels like months off the air, Grimm gave us 'Danse Macabre' this week, which brought the Pied Piper into the picture. And, while it was awesome to see this original, deadmaus-esque take, I was left, once again, wanting more. However, there was some improvement from 'Lonelyhearts,' in that there was less sprinkling of overarching plot and a much greater effort in working the overall story go forward. Even if that means it has to involve the forever boring Juliette."
