= Grammy Award for Best Score Soundtrack for Video Games and Other Interactive Media =

- Awarded for: Quality original scores for video games
- Presented by: National Academy of Recording Arts and Sciences
- First award: 2023
- Currently held by: Austin Wintory – Sword of the Sea (2026)
- Website: grammy.com

The Grammy Award for Best Score Soundtrack for Video Games and Other Interactive Media was first presented at the 65th Annual Grammy Awards held in February 2023. The award was introduced to recognize the impact of music specifically written for video games and other interactive media. This is a sister category to the Grammy Award for Best Score Soundtrack for Visual Media, which previously honored scores written for film, television and video games, though Journey in 2013 was the only game ever nominated.

== Background ==
The Grammy Award for Best Score Soundtrack for Video Games and Other Interactive Media was announced on June 9, 2022 alongside four additional new categories that would be presented for the first time at the 65th Annual Grammy Awards. Of the category, Recording Academy CEO Harvey Mason Jr. stated "We're so excited to honour these diverse communities of music creators through the newly established awards and amendments, and to continue cultivating an environment that inspires change, progress and collaboration. The Academy's top priority is to effectively represent the music people that we serve, and each year, that entails listening to our members and ensuring our rules and guidelines reflect our ever-evolving industry."

Prior to the creation of this category, only three video game soundtracks had ever been nominated at the Grammy Awards and many composers and studios had been campaigning for the Recording Academy to recognize the medium for some time. The first piece of music from a video game ever to be nominated for and win a Grammy in any category was "Baba Yetu", a song arranged by Christopher Tin for Civilization IV which won Best Instrumental Arrangement Accompanying Vocalist(s) at the 53rd Annual Grammy Awards. Following this, composer Austin Wintory's score for Journey was nominated for the Grammy Award for Best Score Soundtrack for Visual Media in 2013. In 2022, Charlie Rosen and Jake Silverman won the Grammy Award for Best Arrangement, Instrumental or A Cappella for their cover of "Meta Knight's Revenge" from Kirby Super Star.

== Criteria ==
Albums that are eligible for this award must predominantly contain scores specifically written for, or as a companion to, current video games or other interactive media. As of the 67th Annual Grammy Awards, the eligibility criteria was amended to establish that more than 50% of the submitted recording must be derived from new episodes or new programming, allowing seasonal updates and downloadable content to be submitted in the years following the release of the base game.

== Winners and nominees ==
Year	Work	Artist
2023
2023	Assassin's Creed Valhalla: Dawn of Ragnarok	Stephanie Economou
2023	Aliens: Fireteam Elite	Austin Wintory
2023	Call of Duty: Vanguard	Bear McCreary
2023	Marvel's Guardians of the Galaxy	Richard Jacques
2023	Old World	Christopher Tin
2024
2024	Star Wars Jedi: Survivor	Stephen Barton and Gordy Haab
2024	Call of Duty: Modern Warfare II	Sarah Schachner
2024	God of War Ragnarök	Bear McCreary
2024	Hogwarts Legacy	Peter Murray, J Scott Rakozy and Chuck Myers
2024	Stray Gods: The Roleplaying Musical	Jess Serro, Tripod and Austin Wintory
2025
2025	Wizardry: Proving Grounds of the Mad Overlord	Winifred Phillips
2025	Avatar: Frontiers of Pandora	Pinar Toprak
2025	God of War Ragnarök: Valhalla	Bear McCreary
2025	Marvel's Spider-Man 2	John Paesano
2025	Star Wars Outlaws	Wilbert Roget II
2026
2026	Sword of the Sea	Austin Wintory
2026	Avatar: Frontiers of Pandora – Secrets of the Spires	Pinar Toprak
2026	Helldivers 2	Wilbert Roget II
2026	Indiana Jones and the Great Circle	Gordy Haab
2026	Star Wars Outlaws: Wild Card & A Pirate's Fortune	Cody Matthew Johnson and Wilbert Roget II
2027	Avatar: Frontiers of Pandora – From the Ashes	John Paesano
2027	007 First Light	Joe Henson and Alexis Leon Smith
2027	Ghost of Yōtei	Toma Otawa
2027	Marvel's Wolverine	David Fleming
2027	Star Wars Zero Company	Gordy Haab

== Composers with multiple nominations ==
3 nominations

- Gordy Haab
- Bear McCreary
- Wilbert Roget II
- Austin Wintory

2 nominations

- John Paesano
- Pinar Toprak
