= Nick Thurston =

American actor (born 1987)

- Born: December 7, 1987 (age 38)
- Education: University of Southern California
- Occupation: Actor
- Years active: 2007–present
- Spouse: Alexandra Fratella (m. 2023)

Nick Thurston (born December 7, 1987) is an American actor, born and raised in the San Francisco Bay area of California. A college graduate, Thurston attended several schools, including the American Conservatory Theater, as well as the British American Drama Academy located in London. Thurston finally graduated with a bachelor's degree in acting from the University of Southern California. Since graduating, Thurston has become an active member in the acting community, starring in several films including Reviving Ophelia, White Irish Drinkers, Not for Human Consumption, and a notable appearance as Blue Eyes, who is considered to be the secondary ape protagonist in Dawn of the Planet of the Apes. Nick has also acted on the set of several TV shows including Ghost Whisperer, Cold Case, and The Truth Below on well-known TV broadcasting stations including CBS and MTV. Thurston has also appeared in The Lake, an online TV series created by Warner Bros. Entertainment Inc.

== Career ==
=== Select film appearances ===
==== Dawn of the Planet of the Apes ====
Thurston portrays Blue Eyes in Dawn of the Planet of the Apes. Here, Thurston plays the role of a young, rebellious, and stubborn ape. This is Thurston's first experience with a blockbuster movie, as all of his prior experience was with small scale, low budget indie productions.

==== White Irish Drinkers ====
Thurston plays the role of Brian Leary, the primary protagonist in White Irish Drinkers. Here Thurston plays an artistic young man, who is misunderstood and underappreciated by his family and friends, who find themselves content with labor-intensive work, and have no aptitude to go on to higher education. Brian, surrounded by a dreary reality, finds an escape in his art. This escape allows Brian to avoid the life of crime his brother has chosen, and to block out the problems that life has presented to him. "The Observer describes Brian as 'a boy with a conscience who turns the basement room under the bagel shop in his parents’ building into a secret art studio, where he creates impressionistic charcoal drawings and watercolor sketches of the city around him, donning headphones to drown out the noise and shouting between his parents.'"

==== Not for Human Consumption ====
In a film inspired by true events, Nick Thurston Stars as Jay Trotta, a witty, young ex-drug abuser who has just been liberated from prison. Now sober, Jay plans to make his way in the world in a respectable way, staying away from the drugs that landed him in prison. Eventually, after a good deal of time and hard work, Jay becomes the partial owner of a newly founded hookah bar. Eventually, Jay's past catches up with him, and he gets involved with the selling of a new drug disguised as incense, avoiding legal trouble by labeling the drug as "not for human consumption".

=== Select television appearances ===
==== Grimm ====
Thurston played violinist prodigy Roddy Geiger in the 5th episode of the first season of Grimm.

==== Ghost Whisperer ====
Thurston makes a guest appearance as a Varsity Football player in the premiere of season five of Ghost Whisperer, though his role on the show was never permanent.

==== Cold Case ====
Thurston stars as Nash Simpson, a guest role in "Hood Rats", an episode from the second episode of the seventh season of Cold Case.

== Personal life ==
Thurston currently lives in Los Angeles, California with his long time girlfriend-now-wife Alexandra Fratella.

== Filmography ==
=== Film ===
Year	Title	Role	Notes
2008	S.E.R.E.		
2010	White Irish Drinkers	Brian	
2010	Reviving Ophelia	Mark Stenwyck	
2011	The Truth Below	Dante	
2014	Dawn of the Planet of the Apes	Blue Eyes	
2019	The End of Love	Henry	Short film

=== Television ===
Year	Title	Role	Notes
2009	The Lake	Luke	Main role
2009	Ghost Whisperer	Varsity Football Player	Episode: "Birthday Presence"
2009	Cold Case	Nash Simpson	Episode: "Hood Rats"
2011	The Protector	Kevin Dickey	Episode: "Wings"
2011	Grimm	Roddy Geiger	Episode: "Danse Macabre"
2012	Castle	Buck Cooper/Hank Rodgers	Episode: "Swan Song"
2013	Bones	Nick Pavonetti	Episode: "The Friend in Need"
2016	Heartbeat	Sam	Episode: "Backwards"
2016	Pure Genius	Billy Watts	Episode: "Fire and Ice"
2017	Snowfall	Gun Dealer	Episode: "Slow Hand"
2021	Dota: Dragon's Blood	Idwal (voice)	Episode: "Neverwhere Land"
2022	FBI: Most Wanted	Will Conway	Episode: "Decriminalized"
2023	The Last Thing He Told Me	Agent Jeremy O'Mackey	2 episodes
2023	Family Guy	Unknown	Episode: "Adult Education"
2020–2023	American Dad!	Restaurant Employee, Mason (voice)	5 episodes

=== Video games ===
Year	Title	Role	Notes
2020	Spider-Man: Miles Morales	Additional voices	
2021	Neo: The World Ends with You	Motoi Anazawa	
2025	Date Everything!	Sinclaire, Jeremy from Valdivian, Sudsy	

== Awards ==
Nick Thurston received the best actor award for his performance in Primrose at the Hollyshorts film festival in 2015.
