= Pilot (Grimm) =

- Grimm episode
- Episode no.: Season 1 Episode 1
- Directed by: Marc Buckland
- Story by: David Greenwalt; Jim Kouf; Stephen Carpenter
- Teleplay by: David Greenwalt; Jim Kouf
- Cinematography by: Clark Mathis
- Editing by: Chris Willingham
- Production code: 101
- Original air date: October 28, 2011
- Running time: 42 minutes

Guest appearances
- Tim Bagley as Postman; Claire Coffee as Adalind Schade; Ayanna Berkshire as Rose; Kate Burton as Marie Kessler

Episode chronology
← Previous —	Next → "Bears Will Be Bears"
- Grimm season 1

The Pilot episode of the fantasy drama series Grimm originally aired on NBC on October 28, 2011. It was written by David Greenwalt and Jim Kouf, the creators of the series, and directed by Marc Buckland.

== Synopsis ==
Opening quote: "The wolf thought to himself, what a tender young creature. What a nice plump mouthful..."

After presenting a quote by The Brothers Grimm, the cold open shows a girl in a red sweatshirt running through the woods. She is attacked by a wolf-like creature, after she stops to check out a small figurine lying on the ground.

Later that morning, police officer Nick Burkhardt (portrayed by David Giuntoli), and his partner Hank Griffin (Russell Hornsby), are discussing Nick's plans to propose to his girlfriend. A woman walks by and while looking at Nick, her face changes to that of a non-human creature. Hank appears not to notice anything. They are then called to investigate the murder of the runner.

After visiting the murder scene, Nick and Hank are working at a station of the Portland Police Department. There is a man being processed by another detective, and when Nick looks at him, his face momentarily changes into that of a beast. Nick is again the only one who sees this transformation.

Later that night, Nick comes to his home to find his girlfriend, to whom he is preparing to propose, Juliette Silverton (Bitsie Tulloch), conversing with his aunt, Marie Kessler (portrayed by guest star Kate Burton), who had just come to town with a trailer. Nick finds out that Marie is dying of breast cancer, and she informs him that he is one of the last in a long line of people called Grimms, who can see beasts reminiscent of those about which The Brothers Grimm wrote. She is later attacked by one of those beasts, and Nick manages to shoot the creature who, upon dying, transforms back to a human. Badly injured, Marie gives Nick a key, which he is supposed to protect with his life.

At the hospital, Marie informs Nick more about his family and the Grimms, and she informs him that all he needs to know is in her trailer. He goes in the trailer that night and finds a various assortment of weapons and a book, which details encounters with various creatures and descriptions of what they are. When attempting to inform his aunt that he has previously seen some of the creatures about which he had read, he finds out she had slipped into a coma.

Nick then is informed of a case in which a young girl also wearing a red sweater is abducted on her way to her grandparents house (or school). He connects this to the previous case after finding the young girl's backpack (bearing the letters R. H., written in marker) in the woods and a boot print similar to one found at the crime scene of a murdered college student (as well as her shoe with her leg still attached). In the woods, he follows a trail that leads him to the house of a man, Monroe (Silas Weir Mitchell), whom he arrests after seeing his face change. Monroe is found to be clean and then released, but Nick, being suspicious, returns to Monroe's house. After a scuffle, he has a conversation with Monroe, who turns out to be a reformed Blutbad, the same type of creature as the one that attacked the girls. Monroe agrees to help Nick solve the case. After following the scent of another Blutbad, Monroe leads Nick to the Blutbad's cabin in the woods. Monroe begins transforming against his own will and, fearing that he might attack either Nick or the girl, retreats.

Nick calls in Hank to investigate the cabin, and the two of them enter the cabin. Hank is initially dismissive of Nick's thoughts, as the Blutbad appears to be a simple postman named Errol Ditmarsch. However, upon exiting the cabin, Hank realizes that Ditmarsch was humming the same song found on the dead girl's iPod: Sweet Dreams (Are Made of This) by Eurythmics. They return to the cabin only to find the lights out, and nobody there. Then Ditmarsch attacks Hank in morphed form, but as he runs out of the cabin, Hank opens fire on him. Nick then tries to interrogate Ditmarsch about the girl's whereabouts, but Ditmarsch only says "Grimm..." before dying from his wounds. Nick and Hank return to the cabin, and Nick finds a secret passage to the cellar room, under the rug. As both of them enter the cellar room, they find the missing girl and return her to her home.

At the hospital, while a reprise Sweet Dreams (Are Made of This) by Marilyn Manson is played, the woman who transformed in front of Nick at the beginning of the episode arrives with a syringe. Realizing who she is, Nick intervenes and gets injected with the syringe instead of Marie. The woman escapes the hospital and meets up with Captain Renard; both of them had conspired to kill Marie. When Renard asks if Marie is dead, the woman says that because Nick was there to save Marie, Marie lived. Renard then tells her that they will have to try the attempt again in the hopes that Nick is not there and Marie is not conscious when they do so. As they drive away, Marie opens her eyes, having fully awakened from the coma.

The episode's plot contains references to Little Red Riding Hood.

== Production ==
=== Development ===
David Greenwalt and Jim Kouf, who had worked together before on projects such as Angel, conceived the show. Grimm was pitched to NBC as "The Brothers Grimm in the Modern World." The pilot episode was greenlit by NBC in January 2011, and filming began in Portland, Oregon, in March of the same year. Intending to make the set version of the Portland Police Department look as real as possible, the Grimm crew received permission to utilize actual police uniforms (except for the badges).

=== Casting ===
David Giuntoli and Silas Weir Mitchell were the first to be cast, portraying Nick Burkhardt and Monroe, respectively. Russell Hornsby, who portrays Nick's partner, Hank, and Bitsie Tulloch, portraying Nick's girlfriend on the show, were next to be cast. Sasha Roiz was later cast as Captain Renard.

== Ratings and reception ==
Initial response from the Portland film industry was favorable. Grimm was the third TV series to be produced in Portland, and potential success seemed like a way to bring "bigger things" to the area.

Before the episode premiered on television, promotional screenings were held, and the entire episode was released on social media websites. After a screening at Comic-Con, IGN did a preliminary review of the pilot, noting that "the monster effects were much better here than they were in [Angel or Buffy the Vampire Slayer]".

The series premiere of Grimm was viewed by 6.56 million people, earning a 2.1/6 18-49 rating on the Nielson ratings scale. This means that 2.1 percent of all households with televisions watched the episode, while 6 percent of all households watching television at that time watched it. Grimm had the highest non-sports rating on a Friday for any network since New Year's Eve of 2010.

Reviews of the episode ranged from mixed to positive. IGN gave the episode an 8 out of 10, stating that it "is grounded in reality, and no costumes or settings tiptoe into an unbelievable place." Newsday, stating that the pilot "is a well-made, entertaining TV confection," gave the episode a B rating. The Wall Street Journal said Grimm "may be onto something good. It can be genuinely scary (the pilot has a "Lovely Bones" vibe that's not for children). But it has wit too, and avoids camp." In a comparison with the Once Upon A Time, a show similar in genre to Grimm, The Hollywood Reporter gave Grimm the upper hand based on the pilot episode, calling Grimm "more grown-up in its approach than Once Upon a Time because it's more violent and less hokey." However, in a comparison between the two shows by The New York Times, Once Upon a Time was seen as better, being described as "having the richer premise and more interesting characters".
