= 90210 season 3 =

90210
- Season 3
- DVD cover
- Starring: Shenae Grimes; Tristan Wilds; AnnaLynne McCord; Jessica Stroup; Michael Steger; Jessica Lowndes; Ryan Eggold; Lori Loughlin; Matt Lanter; Trevor Donovan; Gillian Zinser
- No. of episodes: 22

Release
- Original network: The CW
- Original release: September 13, 2010 – May 16, 2011

Season chronology
- ← Previous; Season 2 Next → Season 4

The third season of 90210, an American television series, premiered on Monday September 13, 2010. The CW officially renewed the show for a third season on February 16, 2010. With the reveal of the networks fall 2010 schedule, they announced their decision to move 90210 to Monday nights at 8:00 pm, as a lead-in to Gossip Girl. It premiered on September 13, 2010 and was met with generally positive reviews from critics.

== Overview ==
The season begins with the West Bev gang's rocky start to senior year when Beverly Hills is rocked by an earthquake. Naomi has spent the summer dealing with the consequences of her rape by Mr. Cannon. Dixon and Annie's lives undergo significant changes. Meanwhile, Debbie tries to adapt to life as a single mother and gets help from the unlikliest of people. After suffering a career ending injury, Teddy embarks on a self discovery journey. Ivy starts to spiral after nearly encountering a life-threatening situation. After being kicked out his stepdad's house, Liam faces the struggles of being jobless and homelessness. Adrianna has finally achieved her dream of fame, but unbeknownst to her friends and Navid, it is based on a devastating lie. Meanwhile, Navid discovers a heartbreaking secret that threatens to tear his family apart. All the while, they navigate the harsh realities of LA, their senior year will be unforgettable.

== Cast and characters ==
=== Main ===
- Shenae Grimes as Annie Wilson
- Tristan Wilds as Dixon Wilson
- AnnaLynne McCord as Naomi Clark
- Ryan Eggold as Ryan Matthews
- Jessica Stroup as Erin Silver
- Michael Steger as Navid Shirazi
- Jessica Lowndes as Adrianna Tate-Duncan
- Matt Lanter as Liam Court
- Gillian Zinser as Ivy Sullivan
- Trevor Donovan as Teddy Montgomery
- Lori Loughlin as Debbie Wilson

=== Recurring ===
- Blair Redford as Oscar
- Evan Ross as Charlie Selby
- Kelly Lynch as Laurel Cooper
- Kyle Riabko as Ian
- Josh Zuckerman as Max Miller
- Manish Dayal as Raj Kher
- Nestor Serrano as Victor Luna
- Hal Ozsan as Miles Cannon
- Abbie Cobb as Emily Bradford
- Freddie Smith as Marco Salazar
- Sara Foster as Jennifer "Jen" Clark
- Amelia Rose Blaire as Laura Mathison
- Diego Boneta as Javier Luna
- Amanda Leighton as Alex Scarborough
- Justin Deeley as Austin Talridge

=== Special guest stars ===
- Kim Kardashian as herself
- Khloe Kardashian as herself
- Joe Jonas as himself
- Nelly as himself
- Snoop Dogg as himself

== Episodes ==
No. overall	No. in season	Title	Directed by	Written by	Original release date	U.S. viewers (millions)
47	1	"Senior Year, Baby"	Stuart Gillard	Jennie Snyder Urman	September 13, 2010	1.96
Beverly Hills is rocked by an earthquake during the first day of the school year. Naomi has spent the summer in isolation, dealing with the aftermath of her rape by Mr. Cannon and keeping it a secret. Annie and Dixon are dealing with the absence of their father who has walked out on the family, while Debbie tries to hold the family together without Harry and a job. Meanwhile, Teddy and Silver find themselves happier than ever until he suffers a leg injury that could end his tennis career forever. Annie applies for an internship at a local theater company called the Abbott Playhouse. Navid welcomes Adrianna back from her tour with Javier, but their arrival brings an unexpected death. Ivy returns from Australia with her an old childhood friend, named Oscar, which makes Dixon uncomfortable. Elsewhere, Annie and Liam confront their feelings for each other.
48	2	"Age of Inheritance"	Liz Friedlander	Padma L. Atluri	September 20, 2010	1.83
After turning 18, Naomi finds out she can now access the money in her large trust fund, so she decides to throw herself a huge birthday party at the Beach Club where she hires the Honey Brothers band to perform. Meanwhile, Dixon, Navid, and Teddy decide to take Oscar out for a night on the town, but their party cuts short when ivy finds out via a Facebook post that Dixon did a body shot off of a girl and Silver finds out that Teddy was still drinking, resulting in them breaking up. Annie has an instant connection with Charlie, a guy she meets at a coffee shop. Jen is forced to go on bed rest until she delivers the baby and has no choice but to allow Ryan into her life. Elsewhere, Adrianna uses Javier's song book to get back in good favor with the label. Entourage's Adrian Grenier performs with his band at Naomi's birthday party.
49	3	"2021 Vision"	Millicent Shelton	Tod Himmel	September 27, 2010	1.96
Naomi has constant flashbacks to her rape and begins taking sleeping pills in order to sleep through the night. Mr. Cannon invites Silver over to his apartment to watch his new documentary, and possibly be his new victim. Meanwhile, Teddy wakes up from a night of drinking and realizes he hooked up with someone, but does not remember who. Dixon learns that Ivy is a virgin. At her intern job, Annie confronts her boss, Katherine, about her awkward behavior and is shocked when she makes Annie an offer she may not be able to refuse. Adrianna sings another song stolen out of Javier's songbook at his memorial service, but she soon regrets it when a video of her music number goes viral.
50	4	"The Bachelors"	David Warren	David S. Rosenthal	October 4, 2010	1.79
Silver plans a cancer-awareness charity event to honor her late mother and enlists the boys to appear in a bachelor auction. Ian, a Senior and theater student at West Bev, is brought in to help choreograph a dance number for the auction, but all comes to a stand-still when Teddy directs some negative words toward him. The two later get into a fight. Meanwhile, Annie and Adrianna discover the truth about Naomi and Mr. Cannon from Silver. Elsewhere, Annie discovers Debbie's money problems since Harry left her and makes a possibly life changing decision. A surprising connection between Charlie and Liam is revealed. Javier's uncle, Victor, begins to blackmail Adrianna with exposure by forcing her to work for him. Also, Ivy and Dixon decide to spend the night together, but Dixon hits the brakes when his ex-girlfriend, Sasha, returns with some devastating news that may put Dixion's entire future and life in jeopardy.
51	5	"Catch Me If You Cannon"	Jim Conway	Terrence Coli	October 11, 2010	1.81
Silver, Naomi, and Adrianna craft a plan to seduce Mr. Cannon to prove he raped Naomi, but their plan backfires significantly. Teddy and Ian are forced to do manual labor as a punishment for fighting. Dixon fears for his life and pushes Ivy away, leading her straight into the arms of Oscar (just as he planned the whole time for). Meanwhile, Jen looks for a new assistant and Debbie applies for the job. Debbie finds out about the arrangement
52	6	"How Much Is That Liam in the Window"	Stuart Gillard	David S. Rosenthal & Jennie Snyder Urman	October 25, 2010	2.03
When Jen and Ryan find out about Naomi's rape, Jen decides to take matters into her own hands, while Ryan's job may be in jeopardy when he encourages Naomi to come forward with him as a witness. Adrianna's manager, Victor, continues to blackmail her and goes even further when he encourages her to go topless at a photo-shoot. Annie discovers a darker side of Charlie when she sneaks in to observe a staged reading of his play. Liam lands a humiliating job modeling in the window of a clothing store and receives a job opportunity from a mysterious customer, named Laura, that he can't refuse. Dixon apologizes to Ivy unaware that she slept with someone else. Oscar decides that it's finally time to confront Luara and Ivy with their secrets and confess a secret of his own.
53	7	"I See London, I See France..."	Krishna Rao	Scott Weinger	November 1, 2010	2.00
Ryan helps Naomi press charges against Mr. Cannon and as a result, both Mr. Cannon and Ryan are suspended from their jobs. Navid finds out that his father is employing an underage girl in his pornography business. Meanwhile, Ivy tells Dixon what happened between her and Oscar, which he predictably does not take well. Teddy struggles with rumors and innuendo about his suspected impotency. Liam continues his job of carrying purses for Laura, until he finds out that it's just a front for something more sinister. Elsewhere, Navid and Silver attend the Achievement Awards dinner while Annie, Teddy, Liam, Dixon, Ivy and Ian attend an under-achievement ceremony, called "The Undies", at the Beach Club.
54	8	"Mother Dearest"	Oz Scott	Paul Sciarrotta	November 8, 2010	1.89
Annie and Dixon drive to Pomona to visit their father, but unexpectedly meet a young woman at his door making them leave without seeing Harry.Still in shock, The Dixion and Annie decides to move on by removing all traces Harry's existence from the house and their lives and from then on live as if Harry never existed. Feeling inadequate as a mother, Jen leaves Jack at Ryan and leaves town again. Ivy and Naomi join forces to humiliate and take down Oscar. Meanwhile, Navid asks Silver to help prove that his father is lying to him about employing underage girls at his studio by asking Silver to go undercover. Also, Victor demands Adrianna attend a red carpet event with Joe Jonas, rather than Navid.
55	9	"They're Playing Her Song"	Rob Hardy	Jennie Snyder Urman & Jenna Lamia	November 15, 2010	1.76
Teddy decides to visit a gay bar in West Hollywood, but is forced to turn to the most unlikeliest person for help when he forgot his wallet. Meanwhile, Annie is ready to take her relationship with Charlie to the next level, but the both of them send mixed signals to each other resulting in an embarrassing situation. Meanwhile, Ryan turns to Debbie for parental advice, and the two end up hooking up. Navid deals with the fallout at school and at home after turning his father in to the authorities. Also, Adrianna continues to be oblivious to Navid's situation due to her newfound fame.
56	10	"Best Lei'd Plans"	David Warren	David S. Rosenthal & Deborah Schoeneman	November 29, 2010	2.01
Naomi jumps back into the dating world and tries to impress one of Ivy's surfer friends, Zach, by pretending to know how to surf. Still upset with her mother over the Oscar situation, Ivy decides to build a relationship with her estranged father. Not knowing she has feelings for Ryan, Annie and Dixon sign Debbie up for an online dating service. While at the beach luau, Teddy gets jealous when he sees Ian with another guy and allows his feelings to control his actions. Meanwhile, Adrianna and Navid's relationship becomes strained, leading him into the arms of Silver. Elsewhere, Liam learns more about Laura and of her ex-boyfriend whom he attempts to make jealous in her favor.
57	11	"Holiday Madness"	Dennis Smith	Rebecca Sinclair	December 6, 2010	2.18
Adrianna leases an expensive new house and throws a housewarming Christmas party to celebrate her new record deal. After having enough of her egotistical attitude, Victor decides to reveal Adrianna's secret on the Internet. Annie spends the night with Liam when he comes back from the hospital, and the two rekindle their romance. Ivy's father's unexpected intentions lead her to reconcile with her mother. After deciding to keep their relationship a secret, Ian and Teddy kiss unaware that Dixon saw them. Meanwhile, Navid and Silver confess their true feelings towards each other... and share a kiss. Elsewhere, Naomi continues to reject Oscar's advances whom tries to ask her out on a date to the Christmas party. Naomi attends solo and later returns home not knowing that Mr. Cannon is awaiting her.
58	12	"Liars"	Stuart Gillard	Tod Himmel	January 24, 2011	1.69
Naomi is taken hostage in her apartment by an out-of-control Mr. Cannon who also lures Silver into the situation. Meanwhile, Annie and Dixon's cousin Emily from Kansas comes to town for an extended visit, but Emily immediately gets on Annie's nerves. Dixon confronts Teddy about his kiss with Ian and promises to keep his secret. Ivy has a near fatal accident during surf practice that makes her question her ability to compete in the surf competition. Adrianna's world continues to crumble when she appears on a talk show to tell her side of the story, and she is blindsided by a surprise guest when Victor appears to give "his" side of the story. Given Adrianna's disastrous situation, Navid and Silver continue to keep their hook-ups a secret.
59	13	"It's Getting Hot in Here"	Liz Friedlander	David S. Rosenthal	January 31, 2011	1.67
Naomi, Adrianna, Silver, and Annie decide to have a girls' weekend and head to a yoga retreat in Ojai. Annie attempts to be a good cousin and invites Emily along for the weekend but confronts her about being a downer on the trip. Emily begins to show her true devious colors when she purposefully neglects to wake Annie up for a sweat lodge session and uses the opportunity to manipulate and turn the rest of the girls against Annie. Naomi, who originally thought the retreat was silly, suddenly decides to extend her stay as a way to recover from her encounter with Mr. Cannon. Silver runs into Navid at the retreat, and the two have a secret rendezvous. Adrianna returns from the retreat and calls a tabloid newspaper to sell an exclusive story. Back in Beverly Hills, Debbie plans a romantic dinner at her house for Ryan, but they are interrupted by Dixon, forcing Ryan to quickly find a place to hide. Elsewhere, Charlie finally realizes that Annie has feelings for Liam, and leaves to study abroad in France.
60	14	"All About a Boy"	Harry Sinclair	Paul Sciarrotta	February 7, 2011	1.75
Navid breaks up with Adrianna after learning how she used the baby she gave up for adoption to sell a story to a tabloid news magazine. Adrianna then leans on Silver for support and makes a shocking discovery. Meanwhile, Annie gets the opportunity to audition for a play but Emily sabotages her by letting it slip about Debbie's romance with Ryan. Teddy is being blackmailed and is surprised to find out who is behind it. At Ian's encouragement, Teddy decides to come out to his friends. Naomi returns from her spiritual retreat and decides to throw a party for Guru Sona but realizes that she may not be the person she thinks she is. Also, Ivy has reservations about getting back in the water after her accident.
61	15	"Revenge with the Nerd"	Millicent Shelton	Terrence Coli	February 14, 2011	1.37
Dixon and Navid convince a music producer to shoot a music video for Nelly at Shirazi Studios to keep the struggling studio in business. Adrianna's suspicions about Navid having cheated on her are confirmed, and she informs Silver about her plot for revenge. Meanwhile, Emily attempts to distract Annie in an effort to seduce Liam. Teddy turns to Silver for support after coming out and his breakup with Ian. Elsewhere, reality producers follow Adrianna and her friends around trying to shoot a pilot, and Naomi is surprised by her reaction to a nerdy lab partner, Max, who helps her out with Guru Sona.
62	16	"It's High Time"	Krishna Rao	Padma Alturi	February 21, 2011	1.52
The crafty and manipulative Emily continues to cause mayhem in Annie's life by messing with Liam, her friends, and maliciously gets Annie fired from her internship at the Abbott Playhouse and even goes as far as to provoke Annie into physically attacking her to get her suspended from school. Annie eventually realizes that no one will believe her about the not-so-innocent and no-good Emily's true nature and begins to work on a plan to defeat Emily at her own game. Meanwhile, Silver convinces Navid to sign the release for Adrianna's TV reality show to help distract her from their secret relationship. Naomi keeps her feelings for Max to herself. Ivy meets a new guy, named Raj, and they strike up a friendship over their use of medical marijuana. Elsewhere, Dixon, Navid, and Liam take Teddy out on the town to show that they are trying to accept him after his coming out. After watching footage from her Christmas party, Adrianna makes a stunning realization.
63	17	"Blue Naomi"	Elizabeth Allen	David S. Rosenthal	February 28, 2011	1.45
Naomi attempts to impress Max by dressing up in an Avatar costume, but it doesn't get the response that she was aiming for. Dixon and Navid formalize their partnership, and a chance encounter with Snoop Dogg could mean good news for them and Shirazi Studios 2.0. Adrianna's vindictive ways deepen after discovering the truth about Navid and Silver's romance, and she vows to get back at both of them. Meanwhile, Annie and Liam secretly work together to expose Emily for the cynical person that she really is to everyone. As a result, Emily decides to leave town, but doesn't tell Debbie of the reason why she is leaving. Elsewhere, Raj confides in Ivy about his past, revealing a shocking secret.
64	18	"The Enchanted Donkey"	David Paymer	Story by : Rebecca Sinclair; Teleplay by : Rebecca Sinclair & Paul Sciarrotta	April 18, 2011	1.72
The group decides to spend spring break in Mexico, where things get out of control for everyone. Naomi brings along Max on the ruse that she intends to ask him for further tutoring with schoolwork. Annie and Liam spend quality time together to take in the scenery until an accident confines Annie to their hotel room. Teddy runs into Tripp, his former boarding school roommate and crush. Ivy uses the time to keep distant from Raj after thinking that he may die soon and confides in Dixon about her recent problems. Meanwhile, the rift between Silver and Adrianna comes to a shocking head.
65	19	"Nerdy Little Secrets"	Harry Sinclair	David Rosenberg	April 25, 2011	1.74
Naomi becomes tired and more insecure of hiding her relationship with Max and, afraid that he might be cheating on her, follows him to an academic decathlon event to confront him, but soon regrets what happens. Navid becomes worried when Silver begins to behave erratically after Adrianna secretly swipes Silver's bipolar medication. Meanwhile, Annie forms a bond with Marla Templeton, a veteran actress whom she is hired to work for. Elsewhere, Raj helps Ivy get over her fear of getting into the water again.
66	20	"Women on the Verge"	Stuart Gillard	Scott Weinger & Jenna Lamia	May 2, 2011	1.47
After receiving some distressing news, Silver has an emotional breakdown, causing Navid and Dixon to stage an intervention. Meanwhile, Annie persuades Marla to attend a Hollywood movie re-release premiere of one of her old films after Marla confides in Annie about her serious health problems. When Teddy discovers Marco has been lying to him, he begins to question if Marco is cheating on him, but learns that Marco is actually hiding something else. Naomi learns that Max was accepted to a college in a different state, while Ryan has an unexpected visitor when Jen Clark returns.
67	21	"The Prom Before the Storm"	Mike Listo	David Rosenthal & Terrence Coli	May 9, 2011	1.43
Just as everyone is preparing for the upcoming senior prom, Annie and Dixon receive some devastating news concerning their futures when they are told by Debbie that she cannot afford to send them to private universities. Meanwhile, Ivy discovers that Raj's health has taken a turn for the worse. Elsewhere, Adrianna takes the opportunity to try to rekindle her relationship with Navid while Silver is hospitalized in a psych ward following her relapse with her bipolar disorder. Silver begins to figure out that Adrianna may have swiped her medication, but has difficulty convincing Navid. Also, Naomi and Max's relationship is tested to the limit when she finds out he cheated on a paper for her. Elsewhere, Jen tries to win Ryan back by wanting him to move to Paris with her.
68	22	"To the Future!"	Rebecca Sinclair	Rebecca Sinclair & Paul Sciarotta	May 16, 2011	1.64
Graduation is here for the students of West Bev, but Naomi's future is in jeopardy after being found out for cheating. Liam reveals a secret to Annie that threatens their relationship. Adrianna's scheme is accidentally exposed. Silver and Navid try to find a road to recovery. Ivy and Raj decide to have a wedding, despite her mother's wishes. One graduate will get life changing news before their life has even begun.

== Production ==
The CW officially renewed 90210 for a third season on February 16, 2010. On May 20, 2010 the network announced its decision to move 90210 to Monday nights at 8:00 pm Eastern/7:00 pm Central, as a lead-in to Gossip Girl. Together, 90210 and Gossip Girl have the highest concentration of women 18–34 on network television, said The CW. The series is produced by CBS Television Studios, with Rebecca Sinclair as executive producer.

The season premiered on September 13, 2010. The series returned from its midseason break on January 24, 2011, with the season finale airing on May 16, 2011.

=== Storylines ===
I kinda feel like there will be some downward spiral in a way for Naomi's character, but she's good at covering, so she'll still have that facade.

— AnnaLynne McCord on what fans can expect to see from Naomi in season 3 after being attacked by Mr Cannon.

The third season of 90210 welcomed the students of West Beverly Hills High School to their senior year with a surprising new family and the destruction of another. Adrianna's pop career blossomed and a new love will cause the fall out of a group of friends. An earthquake hit Beverly Hills in the premiere. "We wanted to open the season with an event that has both physical and emotional ramifications for several people," said co-executive producer Jennie Snyder Urman, who added that the tremors would prove particularly life-altering for one teen. "One of them has a very serious injury that takes time to resolve and sort of changes the direction of his or her life." It was revealed during the summer of 2010 that either Liam, Navid, or Teddy would come out as gay in season 3. Co-executive producer, Jennie Urman said of that matter, "We want to address the issue in a real and relatable way." The character was later revealed as Teddy. Silver's bi-polar disorder was revisited after Adrianna tampered with her medication when implementing a plot for revenge. In Season 3, Adrianna also sees a boom in her entertainment career as an aspiring reality TV star, though is eventually driven to desperate ends to keep her show alive, such as the pronouncement that she will be seeking to regain the daughter she once gave up for adoption. TVLine revealed that a major character would find out that she was pregnant in the finale. It was later revealed that Naomi was the character in question.

=== Cast ===
I finished my stint there and the show is kind of off on its own, and I'm happy to walk away. It was fun, there's a lot of energy. My friend was producing the first season of the new show, and so that was kind of my motivation to be a part of it. And then he left and it just kind of got a little wonky, so I was happy to be a part of it in the beginning.

— Jennie Garth on leaving the series.

On February 25, 2010, Gillian Zinser, who plays Ivy Sullivan, was promoted to series regular for the third season. On May 20, 2010, with the reveal of The CW's fall schedule, the series regulars for the third season were announced. Shenae Grimes, Tristan Wilds, AnnaLynne McCord, Ryan Eggold, Jessica Stroup, Michael Steger, Jessica Lowndes, Matt Lanter and Lori Loughlin were all announced to be continuing their roles on the show. It was also announced that Trevor Donovan, who plays Teddy Montgomery, was upgraded to series regular.

In January 2010, it was confirmed that Jennie Garth would be leaving 90210 to focus more on her writing. Two days later it was announced that series lead, Rob Estes would also be departing the series. Failure to reach an agreement in contract negotiations have been cited as a factor in Estes' departure, though, he apparently leaves on good terms with the producers and the network. The producers said they were willing to let them go as they are "trying to establish a separate identity for the new show," and want to focus on the younger cast members and not those who starred Beverly Hills, 90210 and Melrose Place. A representative for 90210 told E! Online, "This is Rob's last season on 90210. He's a talented actor and we couldn't have asked for a better Harry Wilson." The actor also released a statement regarding his exit saying, "This is my final season on 90210 and I wish the show, cast and crew nothing but the best. I am looking forward to spending time with my kids and exploring other opportunities."

On June 29, 2010, it was announced that Kim Kardashian, Kourtney Kardashian and Khloé Kardashian would guest-star in the season premiere as themselves. However, it was later revealed that just Kim and Khloe had filmed scenes. Adrian Grenier appeared in one episode with his band at Naomi's 18th birthday party. Entertainment Weekly Blair Redford was cast in a recurring role as a character named Oscar. They revealed he would move in with Ivy and her mother. Evan Ross joined the cast as Charlie, an older newcomer who gets tangled up in a love triangle with two main cast members. Zap2It reported that Mekia Cox would reprise her role as Sasha in the October 3 episode. Kyle Riabko was cast as Ian, a love interest of Teddy. Joe Jonas guest starred in the eighth episode of the season, escorting Adrianna on a red carpet event.

Abbie Cobb began a recurring role in January 2011. She portrayed Annie and Dixon's cousin, Emily, who came to Beverly Hills with the purpose of stealing everything and everybody in Annie's life. Claudia Black joined the cast as Guru Sona, a yoga teacher who Naomi comes to rely on when she meets the characters at a retreat. On December 1, 2010, Movieline announced that rapper Nelly would play himself in an episode of the show in 2011. They revealed the storyline would focus on Dixon (Tristan Wilds) and Navid (Michael Steger) getting involved in the video shoot for Nelly's song 'She's So Fly'. Kyle Riabko left the series to make himself available for the pilot season. Freddie Smith replaced Riabko as Teddy's new love interest, Marco. He was described as "hot", "super-athletic" and openly gay. Snoop Dogg made a cameo appearance as himself in the later half of the season when he ran into Dixon at a carwash. Alan Ritchson guest starred in the seasons eighteenth episode as a former prep-school roommate of Teddy's, who hooks up with him. Oscar nominee, Sally Kellerman appeared in a multi-episode arc as Marla, a former movie star who is suffering from dementia and has become a hoarder. Marla hired Annie to help her clean out her house. Manish Dayal was cast in a recurring role as Raj, who became involved in Ivy's life. Josh Zuckerman was cast in a recurring role as Max Miller, a nerdy student and Naomi's lab partner whom Naomi develops feelings for.

== Reception ==
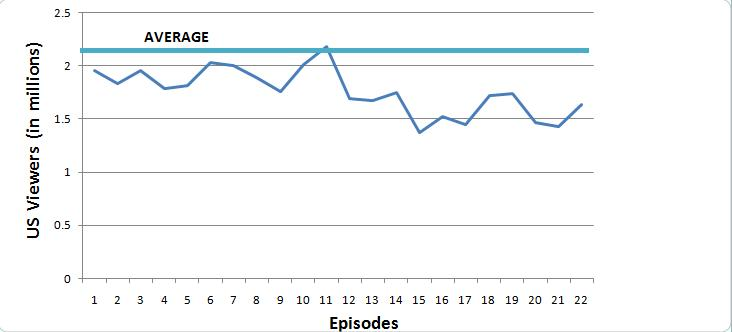
A line graph detailing the trend of viewership for the third season

The season premiere was watched by 1.96 million live viewers in the United States and achieved a 0.9 rating in the adults 18–49 demographic, up 22.5% in viewers and 12.5% in demo from the season two finale. Episode 11 achieved season highs in all key demos with a 1.1 adults 18–49 rating, a 1.4 in adults 18–34 and a 2.1 rating in The CW's target demographic of women 18–34. It was also the most watched episode since October, 2009 with 2.18 million viewers tuning in. Episode 15 hit series lows in women 18–34 with a 1.0 rating and matched series lows in adults 18–49 with a 0.7 rating. The season finale scored a 0.8 rating in adults 18–49, which was lifted to a 1.2 rating with a full week of DVR viewing taken into account. The season averaged 1.75 million viewers and a 0.9 rating in adults 18–49. With live+7 day DVR viewing taken into account, it averaged 2.26 million viewers and a 1.2 rating. In the UK episode eight was seen by 548,000 viewers, which was higher than the pilot episode "We're Not in Kansas Anymore". "Best Lei'd Plans" continued upwards with 604,000 viewers becoming the No. 2 rated show on E4 that week.

Critical reception for the season was mostly positive. TVfanatic.com rated the season premiere 3.7 out of 5 and said, "The series started from scratch in a lot of ways, manufacturing brand new developments that added to 90210's fluidity problem, yet may prove to be promising if the drama can actually stick with certain developments and see them through." Mark Estes of TVOverMind said "The West Beverly kids are back and is it just me or did they NOT disappoint tonight?" His review of the second episode was also positive stating, "Two in a row? 90210 is really coming back strong this year as tonight's episode introduced new people, new plot lines, and the makings of a villain in the increasingly slimy Oscar."

== DVD release ==
The DVD release of season three was released after the season has completed broadcast on television. It has been released in Regions 1, 2 and 4. As well as every episode from the season, the DVD release features bonus material such as deleted scenes, gag reels and behind-the-scenes featurettes.

90210: The Third Season
Set details			Special features
22 episodes; 913 minutes (Region 1); 876 minutes (Region 2); 877 (Region 4); 6-disc set; 1.85:1 aspect ratio; Languages: English (Dolby Digital 2.0 Surround); Subtitles: English, Danish, Dutch, Finnish, Norwegian and Spanish (Region 1); English, Arabic, Dutch, Norwegian, Swedish, English For The Hearing Impaired (Regions 2 and 4)			Audio commentaries: "Coming Out"; "Behind the Scenes with Michael Steger and Matt Lanter Kime Buzzelli, Artist"; "A 90210 Wedding"; "A Season in Review: Senior Year"; "Deleted Scenes"
Release dates			Audio commentaries: "Coming Out"; "Behind the Scenes with Michael Steger and Matt Lanter Kime Buzzelli, Artist"; "A 90210 Wedding"; "A Season in Review: Senior Year"; "Deleted Scenes"
United States	United Kingdom	Australia	Audio commentaries: "Coming Out"; "Behind the Scenes with Michael Steger and Matt Lanter Kime Buzzelli, Artist"; "A 90210 Wedding"; "A Season in Review: Senior Year"; "Deleted Scenes"
August 30, 2011.	August 15, 2011	July 18, 2012	Audio commentaries: "Coming Out"; "Behind the Scenes with Michael Steger and Matt Lanter Kime Buzzelli, Artist"; "A 90210 Wedding"; "A Season in Review: Senior Year"; "Deleted Scenes"
