= 90210 season 4 =

90210
- Season 4
- DVD cover
- Starring: Shenae Grimes; Tristan Wilds; AnnaLynne McCord; Jessica Stroup; Michael Steger; Jessica Lowndes; Matt Lanter; Gillian Zinser
- No. of episodes: 24

Release
- Original network: The CW
- Original release: September 13, 2011 – May 15, 2012

Season chronology
- ← Previous; Season 3 Next → Season 5

The fourth season of 90210, an American television series, premiered on Tuesday September 13, 2011.

Trevor Donovan was dropped as a regular, as a result of ongoing changes by the new showrunners. He returned as a guest star in the fall to conclude his storyline. However, in late February 2012, it was reported that Donovan would return near the end of the season. The CW ordered two additional episodes for the season, which total at 24. It has also been announced that the show got a fifth and final season.

Season four opened to a 0.9 rating in adults 18–49, even with last season premiere. The series returned from its mid-season break on January 17, 2012, one week later than originally announced.

== Synopsis ==
High school's over, Real Life begins for this tight knit group of friends in West Beverly Hills. This season follows the group as they navigate life after high school as their final summer together comes to an end. Their paths towards adulthood will see them going in different directions while attempting to maintain the connection that served them so well in high school. Friendships, connections, and loyalties will be put to the test as this close-knit group of friends meets new people. Some will go to college, while others will start their careers, but the stakes much greater and a lot more to lose. However, anything can happen when they live in a world of glitz and wealth, with endless opportunities in front of them. In this most famous, and iconic zip code, it's just another day.

== Cast and characters ==
=== Main ===
- Shenae Grimes as Annie Wilson
- Tristan Wilds as Dixon Wilson
- AnnaLynne McCord as Naomi Clark
- Jessica Stroup as Erin Silver
- Michael Steger as Navid Shirazi
- Jessica Lowndes as Adrianna Tate-Duncan
- Matt Lanter as Liam Court
- Gillian Zinser as Ivy Sullivan

=== Recurring ===
- Justin Deeley as Austin Talridge
- Trevor Donovan as Teddy Montgomery
- Arielle Kebbel as Vanessa Shaw
- Cameron Goodman as Bree
- Manish Dayal as Raj Kher
- Megalyn Echikunwoke as Holly Stickler
- Josh Zuckerman as Max Miller
- Yani Gellman as Diego Flores
- Nick Zano as Preston Hillingsbrook
- Robert Hoffman as Caleb Walsh
- Tiffany Hines as Kat
- Chris McKenna as Patrick Westhill
- Niall Matter as Greg
- Sara Foster as Jennifer "Jen" Clark
- Ryan Rottman as Shane
- Michelle Hurd as Rachel Gray
- Summer Bishil as Leia Shirazi
- Kristina Apgar as Jane Mcdohpy
- Chloe Bridges as Alexis
- Caitlin Thompson as Madison
- Stephen Amell as Jim Mcdohpy

=== Special guest stars ===
- Brandy Norwood as Marissa Harris-Young
- Billy Ray Cyrus as Judd Ridge
- Vinny Guadagnino as himself
- Kellie Pickler as Sally
- Perez Hilton as himself
- Janice Dickinson as herself
- La Toya Jackson as Marilyn
- Cobra Starship as themselves
- Nick Carter as himself

== Episodes ==
No. overall	No. in season	Title	Directed by	Written by	Original release date	U.S. viewers (millions)
69	1	"Up In Smoke"	Elizabeth Allen	Patti Carr & Lara Olsen	September 13, 2011	1.61
The gang tries to adapt to life after high school. Naomi has spent the summer dealing with her break-up with Max after finding out she isn't pregnant. After she quickly discovers she doesn't have the status at college that she did in high school, she decides to throw a party in her new mansion. Unfortunately her party doesn't end well when the cops arrived. Annie reveals that Debbie has gone to live in Paris with Ryan and receives some unexpected news that keeps her in town, while Liam returns from his summer away ready to commit to Annie. However Annie refuses. Meanwhile, Dixon finds himself without a roommate or a place to live after Navid ruins his chance of finding a dorm on campus, and makes a big decision about his future to concentrate on his music career. Things get complicated for Navid when his younger trouble making sister Leila (guest star Summer Bishil) moves in with him and Silver. Adrianna comes back to town looking to mend her friendships, which she learns will be hard to earn back but ends up in bed with Dixon's roommate, a brash Texan named Austin who has a hostile encounter with Naomi. Elsewhere, Ivy and Raj struggle to deal with Raj's health problems, while Teddy (guest star Trevor Donovan) struggles with coming out to his family.
70	2	"Rush Hour"	Elizabeth Allen	Terrence Coli	September 20, 2011	1.47
Liam decides to keep the beachside bar he bought and details of what happened during his mysterious fishing job are revealed as an unexpected woman, named Jane, from his summer arrives. Meanwhile, Naomi coerces Annie into pledging for a sorority with her. Leila, Navid's sister, is kidnapped, which forces him and Silver to enlist in Adrianna's help. Dixon, on a tight schedule, struggles to prepare a demo CD for a producer he's meeting. Annie's fight for her inheritance from the late Marla Templeton hits a snag when it's revealed that her new boyfriend, Jeremy, is in fact a lawyer and Marla's estranged grandson, and is in town to contest her will as well as sue Annie. Dixon ends up taking his roommate Austin's ADHD medication at his suggestion in order to complete the CD... foretelling a future drug addiction. Leila is found alive and well with her shady boyfriend, whom she'd made a fake ransom video with to get money for them to run away together and open a tattoo parlor. Leila refuses to believe Navid or Silver that her boyfriend is using her and he later threatens Navid that he and Leila will run away together unless he forks over a bribe of $75,000. Navid turns to his evil and a crooked uncle for a 'no-strings-attached' loan to get Leila's boyfriend out of the picture. After a series of difficult tests, Naomi doesn't make it in the sorority as it's revealed that she had outbid the sorority for the house she recently bought and that their president Holly wanted revenge. Annie, however, makes it in and is about to quit when Naomi demands she stay in the sorority to help her take it down.
71	3	"Greek Tragedy"	Rob Hardy	Paul Sciarrotta	September 27, 2011	1.58
Naomi is determined to get revenge on Holly for humiliating her and starts her own 'geek' sorority. Meanwhile, Annie needs to figure out how to make money quickly to pay for sorority-related dues as well as her legal issues in which she meets a fellow CU student, named Bree, who takes Annie out and later reveals herself as a professional escort. As Liam prepares his bar for a grand re-opening, he and Jane grow closer just as Annie finds out about them. Ivy is angry at her friends' lack of compassion for her dying husband Raj and begins to verbally lash out at random people. Adrianna reveals a secret which causes Liam to see her differently. Also, Navid discovers that his uncle is running a car theft ring at Shirazi studios and he tries to stop his uncle once and for all by giving him back the $75,000 which Navid takes from the studio account instead of giving to Dixon to hire a DJ for Liam's party. Navid's uncle takes the money, but goes back on his word to leave Shirazi Studios and threatens to implicate Navid with him should he ever be caught by the authorities.
72	4	"Let the Games Begin"	Millicent Shelton	Jenna Lamia	October 4, 2011	1.29
Naomi attempts to get revenge on Holly by having Naomi's geek sorority compete against Holly's sorority in the annual Greek Games, though it does not go to plan when Max turns up at the Greek games after getting an invite from Holly. Naomi drags Ivy into joining her sorority to help with the competition as Ivy continues to worry about Raj's health. Austin also steps in to offer assistance to Naomi to bring down Holly, despite Naomi's continuing annoyance of him. Annie finds herself torn between her loyalty to both Naomi and Holly while deciding to accept Bree's job offer as a paid escort. Meanwhile, Navid allows Dixon to rent out a recording studio who continues struggling with making a music deadline. Silver decides to film a commercial for Liam's bar, but the work doesn't go as planned. While Liam continues his growing relationship with Jane, Adrianna thinks she has a stalker when a strange man begins following her, and it turns out to be Jane's husband, Jim, who tells Adrianna not to tell anybody he's alive.
73	5	"Party Politics"	Cherie Nowlan	Marjorie David	October 11, 2011	1.54
Silver has the opportunity to create campaign videos for political candidate Marissa Harris-Young (special guest star Brandy Norwood), who is running for public office against Teddy's uncle Charles. Teddy runs into an old flame (guest star Ryan Rottman) who is an employee of Charles' political rival. Annie gets stuck babysitting Leila while on an important date with another high paying client. Leila soon figures out what Annie is doing on the sides and forces her to let her in on her new job. Navid confides in Silver about his uncle blackmailing him, and refuses to let her help him out. Jane's husband, Jim, finally makes his presence known and threatens to hurt Liam and Jane's relationship. Dixon's emerging music career continues to grow. Elsewhere, Naomi struggles to control her growing feelings for Austin during a party to encourage students to vote.
74	6	"Benefit of the Doubt"	James L. Conway	Liz Phang	October 18, 2011	1.41
Liam is offered a modeling job after an agent sees his commercial. Annie starts to fall for an unlikely guy, named Patrick, on one of her escort dates. Meanwhile, Ivy decides to put on a charity talent show for Raj in order to raise money he needs for an experimental cancer treatment. Naomi teams with Max and is determined to win the contest to upstage Austin's out of town visiting friend Sally (guest star Kellie Pickler). Navid ends things with his crooked uncle, but finds out it's far from over as Amal makes an implied threat to hurt Silver if Navid will not continue their business. Dixon begins to push his limits and starts spiraling out of control with his music and speed pill popping, which forces Adrianna to confront him about his problems.
75	7	"It's the Great Masquerade, Naomi Clark"	David Warren	Brian Dawson	November 1, 2011	1.48
Naomi is forced to work with her arch-nemesis Holly to throw a campus Halloween costume party, leading to unfortunate consequences as Holly predictably goes all out to both embarrass Naomi and sabotage the party. Navid's plan to bring down Amal is threatened as he is forced to go undercover for the police and cannot tell anyone (not even Silver) about what he is doing. Silver discovers that her boss and political candidate Marissa Harris-Young is not who she appears to be. Meanwhile, Adrianna handcuffs herself to Dixon for 24 hours in an attempt to get him to stay sober. Also, Annie must decide if she wants to give Patrick another chance. Elsewhere, Ivy connects with a fellow photographer, named Nick, who gives her confidence, and the spotlight-hating Liam does his best to steer clear of a full modeling contract offer.
76	8	"Vegas, Maybe?"	Stuart Gillard	Scott Weinger	November 8, 2011	1.55
The group takes a trip to Las Vegas so Naomi can surprise Austin for his birthday, where Naomi gets to meet Austin's father whom happens to be a famous country music superstar named Judd Ridge. The boys run into a celebrity at the pool, where Liam receives an invitation to play in a celebrity poker tournament. Teddy and Shane decide to get married, and Dixon and Adrianna's relationship continues to grow closer after he calls her to help him after he has a drug relapse. Meanwhile, Navid sees an opportunity to take down his Uncle Amal after he instructs Navid to deliver a package to a contact in Vegas. Silver struggles to balance work with pleasure and she runs into Navid with his handler, Kat, forcing Kat to pretend that she and Navid are a couple. Also, Annie decides to meet Patrick in Vegas, but backs out when she sees him with another escort.
77	9	"A Thousand Words"	Millicent Shelton	Chris Atwood	November 15, 2011	1.59
Silver's video of Teddy's fake Vegas wedding to Shane is accidentally leaked to the press which destroys Teddy's uncle's campaign, leaving him more alone and alienated with people and life more than ever. Silver discovers she accidentally sent the video to Marissa Harris-Young by accident who intentionally leaked it to win the election, leaving Silver even more alienated who ends her business agreement with Marissa. Meanwhile, Liam's modeling contract expands when he is offered a one-year $200,000 modeling offer, but with a catch that he cannot perform in any dangerous activities, including surfing and race-car driving. Liam and Teddy both end up illegally driving on the race car track, before being caught by the police. Annie tries to help Dixon enroll in a rehab program, but cannot afford the $10,000 fee which forces her to ask Patrick for the money, while Dixon becomes more attached to Adrianna to help him recover. Also, Ivy and Raj begin to plan for the future over his expectant cancer recovery as she enrolls in a photography contest at the advice from her photography professor Nick. Elsewhere, Naomi takes one of her geek sorority sisters, Alana, for an evening out where she gives Alana advice on how to pick up a classmate, but the guy only has eyes for Naomi.
78	10	"Smoked Turkey"	Jerry Levine	Miriam Trogdon	November 22, 2011	1.26
Despite her reluctance, Dixon tries to pursue a relationship with Adrianna when he gets a vacation from rehab. Ivy and Raj's arguing starts to take a toll on their marriage when Raj wants to enroll in college in Baltimore, while Ivy is reluctant to leave California where she grew up. Liam plans a Thanksgiving dinner for the group despite the fact that he does not know how to cook, and a surprise visitor shows up who is his estranged mother, but she has an agenda and it's more than family bonding. Meanwhile, Naomi takes some extreme measures to prove her love to Austin by horseback riding with him, which leads to more mishap for her when she gets stranded on a ledge in the mountains. Silver meets a charming professor, named Greg, as she struggles to move on from the departed Navid. Elsewhere, Annie becomes a nervous wreck in fearing that her secret escort profession will be found out. While Dixon decides to come clean with everyone about his drug addiction, Annie only spins more lies to everyone about where she gets her money to pay for Dixon's rehab.
79	11	"Project Runaway"	Harry Sinclair	Allen Clary	November 29, 2011	1.52
Naomi decides to enter a fashion design contest to impress designer Janice Dickinson; unfortunately, Holly shows up determined to win the competition, but they both end up making fools of themselves. Liam, trapped in his modeling contract with Shelia, finds himself caught in the middle of Naomi and Holly's feud. Meanwhile, Dixon struggles with temptations as he tries to make his way back into the music world, much to Adrianna's worry. Annie confronts Jeremy, who stands in the way of her inheritance, to try to arrange a compromise. An impatient Navid reaches a breaking point with his undercover police work to nab his uncle. Elsewhere, Teddy makes a big decision to leave town for a job in England, which upsets Silver, while Shane instead asks Teddy to move with him to Washington DC.
80	12	"O Holly Night"	Stuart Gillard	Paul Sciarrotta	December 6, 2011	1.46
As Christmas draws near, Naomi's new boss, Rachel, asks her to plan her daughter's (Holly's) Birthday Party, which leads to unpleasant consequences. A desperate Annie puts herself in danger when she breaks into Jeremy's apartment trying to find Marla's necklace. Navid goes undercover with his uncle to visit a buyer, but it does not go well. Meanwhile, Dixon must choose between restarting his music career, or a possible future with Adrianna. Silver's new beau, Greg, confides in her about his divorced home life and tells her to decide whether she is serious about starting a relationship with him or not. After hooking-up with Annie, Liam accidentally discovers her secrets. The episode ends with Annie leaving a voice message to Liam telling him that she solved her problems and expressing her interest in getting back together with him after she returns from Paris along with Dixon, who gets Adrianna to collaborate with him, while Liam gets into a motorcycle accident where he is hit by a woman who calls for an ambulance, but claims that she isn't the one responsible for the accident. Naomi catches Austin with Holly.
81	13	"Should Old Acquaintance Be Forgot?"	Cherie Nowlan	Jenna Lamia	January 17, 2012	1.25
Naomi embarrasses herself in front of her boss Rachel (guest star Michelle Hurd) during planning a cadet party in an attempt to get over her break-up with Austin (guest star Justin Deeley). Dixon and Adrianna are booked to perform at a club, where they realize that working together might be a bad idea due to Dixon's jealousy when the club manager makes a pass at Adrianna. Meanwhile, Silver takes her relationship with Greg (guest star Niall Matter) to the next level. A New Year's party Annie throws ends up being a disaster because she is too distracted by Liam's new relationship with the mysterious Vanessa, whom Annie suspects more than meets the eye. Navid becomes obsessed with bringing his uncle down which leads to his police handler, Kat, confiding in Silver about what is going on with him, who then contacts Navid's father to help out. Elsewhere, Ivy returns from her New Guinea excursion with Nick and becomes conflicted about whether to begin a relationship with him.
82	14	"Mama Can You Hear Me?"	Stuart Gillard	Scott Weinger	January 24, 2012	1.24
Naomi is determined to fix the relationship between her boss Rachel and her daughter Holly in order to keep her own life and career on track, which forces Holly and Naomi to work together at a social event despite the fact they both still dislike and distrust each other. Meanwhile, Greg asks Silver to move to New York with him and Navid finds out some shocking information about Greg's daughter whom happens to be Adrianna's biological daughter that she gave up for adoption three years earlier. Dixon spends time with a distraught Austin struggling over his breakup with Naomi, and they end up going for a night on the town and vandalize Holly's sorority house. Elsewhere, Annie begins to investigate Liam's shady and outgoing girlfriend, Vanessa, and her mysterious past after figuring out that she might have been involved with his motorcycle accident. Also, Ivy is worried that she will never see Nick again after he tells her that he wants to leave town for another photography job in war-torn Afghanistan.
83	15	"Trust, Truth and Traffic"	Bethany Rooney	Marjorie David	January 31, 2012	1.38
Dixon gets arrested on suspicion of vandalism and arson of the sorority house, while Annie is worried that her secret of being a former escort/prostitute will be revealed after she learns that while Dixon and Austin indeed vandalized the sorority house, Bree set the fire accidentally to cover up her own involvement in her escort service. Meanwhile, Adrianna and Silver's old feud resumes after Navid tells Adrianna about Silver's new beau, Greg, whose adopted daughter, Maisy, is Adrianna's biological daughter which leads Ade to kidnap Maisy from day care. Vanessa offers to help Liam revitalize business for his bar by throwing a party. Liam asks Naomi for help planning the party and she agrees in order to avoid taking a physics final. Also, Ivy tries to get back into the art world with her photography artwork, but finds that her past with Nick hinders her plans since he used to date the gallery owner whom Ivy presents her photographs to.
84	16	"No Good Deed"	Stuart Gillard	Chris Atwood	February 7, 2012	1.34
Silver realizes she still has feelings for Navid after he announces that he is going to leave town to attend college at Princeton University. Adrianna begins to think that Dixon is losing interest in her over his dedication to his music. Meanwhile, Vanessa promises Liam to make him famous after he gets dropped by his agent. Annie hosts a fundraiser hoping to make a name for herself in high society, but finds complications from the no-show sponsor Preston James "P.J." Hillingsbrook. Elsewhere, Naomi's big party plan for a sweet sixteen birthday for the spoiled daughter of a famous actor, named Mitchell Nash, backfires. Also, Ivy's art gallery opening is dashed after an encounter with a street skateboarder and graffiti artist (guest star Yani Gellman). At the end, Naomi gets an unpleasant surprise when her devious and manipulative older sister, Jen Clark, shows up at her house unannounced with her one-year-old son Jacques, and asks for a place to stay.
85	17	"Babes in Toyland"	Michael Zinberg	Liz Phang	March 6, 2012	1.26
Naomi's sister Jen (guest star Sara Foster) arrives with her infant son for a surprise visit and whom has an agenda to meet and marry for money. Naomi experiences more bad luck when she tries to land a new client by set dressing a sex shop as her "office". Meanwhile, Adrianna and Dixon land a meeting with a major movie producer to discuss music on his next film, but are sabotaged by Vanessa who continues to work behind the scenes to make Liam into a movie star. Annie meets with the eccentric millionaire P.J. for planning another charity event and he persuades her to live life with money to the fullest. Silver gets accepted into New York University and hopes she will be close to Navid in nearby Princeton, but she later has second thoughts. Elsewhere, Ivy attracts attention in the underground scene when she switches to a less conventional style of art.
86	18	"Blood Is Thicker Than Mud"	Stuart Gillard	Paul Sciarrotta	March 13, 2012	1.16
Naomi is convinced that Annie's new business partner P.J. (Nick Zano) is the perfect man for her, but Naomi discovers that Jen is also interested in him and has her own plan to snag him leading to a war of wits between the two sisters that gets increasingly brutal. Meanwhile, Adrianna and Dixon land a spot in a musical festival alongside the band Train. Dixon is offered a recording contract by a record executive (La Toya Jackson), but not Adrianna. Adrianna tells Liam about her suspicions that Vanessa may have staged the near-drowning incident which brought him spotlight fame. But Vanessa soon learns about Adrianna's suspicions and she successfully frames Adrianna for assaulting her. Ivy and her street artist friend Diego are offered an art gallery showing of their work, and when Ivy agrees, it drives a rift between her and Diego who, being a self-proclaimed anarchist, accuses Ivy of selling out. Also, Silver, working as a production assistant on the set of Liam's latest movie, confides in him about her fears of having an inherited cancer gene.
87	19	"The Heart Will Go On"	Matthew Diamond	Patti Carr	March 20, 2012	1.25
Dixon collapses while arguing in the recording studio with Adrianna, and he is taken to the hospital for observation where he and Ade learn that he has a congenital heart condition, but he does not want to tell Annie about it. At the same time, Liam finds himself accompanying Silver to a clinic at the hospital to support her during a test to detect if she has the breast cancer gene, while Vanessa becomes increasingly jealous over the time Liam is spending with Silver and his refusal to explain why. Meanwhile, Ivy debates on her future with Diego in attending an art school or traveling the world, until she learns from Dixon that Raj still has cancer and is in the hospital, near death, and she cannot understand why Raj lied to her about being cancer free. A flu-stricken Jen tries to reconcile with Naomi who evicts her from her house over Jen's continuing manipulation and pursuit of P.J. Elsewhere, Annie meets a new guy named Caleb (guest star Robert Hoffman) while doing cleaning-up detail at the beach, and she later discovers that he is a priest.
88	20	"Blue Ivy"	Stuart Gillard	Terrence Coli	March 27, 2012	1.27
A depressed Ivy struggles with herself in the wake of Raj's Hindu-themed funeral and condolences come from Caleb whom offers to hold an Irish-themed wake on the beach so Ivy can put her grief to rest. P.J. proposes marriage to Naomi, while Annie learns that he needs to get married by his 28th birthday in two weeks in order to gain access to the rest of his billion-dollar trust fund left to him by his late parents. Meanwhile, Navid arrives back in town for a visit where Dixon confesses to him that he signed a record contract but admits he did not tell Adrianna because the label didn't want to sign her. Dixon also accepts a gig to go on tour to play backup for Haley Reinhart, but doesn't tell Adrianna, but she later finds out anyway and forces him to choose either her or his career. Having learned all about Vanessa's misdeeds with starting their own production company as well as breaking Liam's trust by telling Navid that Silver has a cancer gene, Liam angrily tells Vanessa to move out, but afterwards he discovers she has quietly skipped town after cleaning out the cash register and all the money in the production company. Silver then comes to Liam's place for solace after discovering that she indeed has the cancer gene. While embracing, they kiss. The episode ends with a now suicidal Ivy going surfing at night with heavy waves.
89	21	"Bride and Prejudice"	Sanaa Hamri	William H. Brown	April 24, 2012	1.11
When P.J. insists to Naomi that they get married as soon as possible by eloping to Las Vegas, her friends worry that she is rushing too fast to get married. In an attempt to acquaint P.J. to her friends, Naomi decides to throw a small engagement party at her house. However, P.J. takes over the planning and turns into a large party aboard his yacht, which makes Naomi consider the man she is planning to marry. Meanwhile, Austin returns to Los Angeles and offers to be Adrianna's new manager, suggesting she start singing country music as a change of tune to her career after Dixon leaves town without saying goodbye. Caleb is concerned Ivy might not be emotionally stable after he sees her doing foolhardy and dangerous activities. Annie finally admits to Caleb that she is falling for him. Elsewhere, Silver feels conflicted about her feelings for both Navid and Liam who decides to keep his one night stand with Silver a secret.
90	22	"'Tis Pity"	Harry Sinclair	Scott Weinger	May 1, 2012	1.13
Navid begins to suspect that Liam and Silver hooked up, so he decides to confront Liam on the red carpet of Liam's latest movie premiere. Annie and Caleb continue to fight their attraction to one another, but finally give into temptation. Meanwhile, Naomi has been hired to plan the wedding of an heiress which causes Naomi to have a meltdown over her ended engagement to P.J., but later Naomi meets the groom and knows him a little too well. Elsewhere, Austin enlists his father, Judd Ridge (guest star Billy Ray Cyrus), to help launch Adrianna's new country-western career as a side act. Also, Ivy is put into a clinic for observation under suicide watch, where Diego visits, breaks her out, and encourages her to act out her troubles through graffiti, but when they get caught, Diego secretly reveals to Ivy that he is an illegal immigrant and former teenage runaway from Mexico, and wanted in that country for a wide variety of crimes.
91	23	"A Tale of Two Parties"	Rob Hardy	Terrence Coli & Jenna Lamia	May 8, 2012	1.15
A reluctant Naomi tries to sabotage the bachelorette party she has to host for Max's fiancée Madison (guest star Caitlin Thompson) at the local aquarium, where Madison's childhood crush, Nick Carter, makes a surprise appearance. At Max's bachelor party at Liam's bar, both Liam and Navid get into a fight over Silver and the evening comes to a quick end with several people at both parties getting hauled to jail. Meanwhile, Ivy blames both Annie and Caleb for Diego having to go on the run from the law, while at the same time, Caleb goes into a downward spiral over learning about Annie's secret past of being a call girl escort. Silver contemplates having a baby after being aware that her life might be short. Elsewhere, Austin seeks revenge against Bree for the sorority house fire by setting up a sting for her and himself hoping she will confess to the crime.
92	24	"Forever Hold Your Peace"	Harry Sinclair	Lara Olsen	May 15, 2012	1.04
In the season finale, Naomi announces she won't be able to oversee Max's wedding because she has accepted a job in New York City and will be leaving immediately. Meanwhile, Silver feels like she has to choose between Navid and Liam and makes a life-changing decision. Annie and Caleb hide Diego from the police at the church as they decide to help Diego and Ivy with a fund raising rally for Diego to stay in the country, but he declines and decides to turn himself to be deported. Ivy decides to go to Mexico City to be with Diego. Annie decides to end her romance with Caleb after seeing that his dedication to his Catholic faith is stronger than their relationship. Naomi learns that Max was sober when he asked her if he was making a mistake by marrying Madison. She then rushes back from the airport and crashes Max's wedding by saying that she is the true love of his life and not Madison. Max doesn't marry Madison and reveals to Naomi that he loves her too. Liam and Navid's conflict over Silver leads to an unexpected outcome when Silver rejects both of them and decides to have a baby with Teddy. Vanessa returns when Liam's movie emerges a hit and tells him she is legally still his manager, forcing them to keep working together (and so she can continue to pilfer from his salary). Also, Dixon calls Adrianna to give their relationship a second chance. Adrianna agrees, but soon regrets it when Dixon fails to show up at their meeting spot leading her to believe that he bailed on her again as she leaves for Las Vegas with Austin. While on a phone call to Navid, Dixon's car is hit by a truck, leaving his condition unknown.

== Production ==
Promotional marketing campaign for the fourth season.

On March 17, 2011, TVLine announced that Rebecca Sinclair would not renew her contract as executive producer for season four. On April 26, 2011, The CW officially renewed 90210 for a fourth season. On May 12, 2011, it was announced that former Life Unexpected executive producers Patti Carr and Lara Olsen had been hired to take over the series. Their production credits also include Private Practice.

On May 19, 2011, with the reveal of The CW's 2011–12 schedule, it was announced the series would be returning to Tuesday at 8:00 pm Eastern/7:00 pm Central as a lead-in to new Sarah Michelle Gellar series, Ringer. The fourth season premiered on Tuesday, September 13, 2011. On August 3, 2011, The CW ordered two additional episodes for the fourth season, which will now total at 24.

A "Rock the Vote" themed episode aired in October, where Cobra Starship performed their new single "#1Nite." Episode 8 was in Las Vegas. All American Rejects performed in the fifteenth episode of the season.

The CW originally announced as the series would return from its mid-season hiatus with new episodes on January 10, 2012. However, The CW later announced 90210 would return on January 17 to lead into the series premiere of new reality series, "Remodeled". American rock band, Train, appeared in an episode which aired in February 2012. The band performed their latest single "Drive By" in their cameo appearance. The same episode saw the characters going to a music festival in the desert.

=== Cast and characters ===
Before the end of the third season, it was announced that Lori Loughlin and Ryan Eggold would not be returning to the series' fourth season. However, Loughlin has already been asked to return for "some episodes," by the former CW president, if her schedule permits it. The CW press release for their 2011–12 season, included all cast members Shenae Grimes, Tristan Wilds, AnnaLynne McCord, Jessica Stroup, Michael Steger, Jessica Lowndes, Matt Lanter, Trevor Donovan and Gillian Zinser. AnnaLynne McCord confirmed in an interview with Entertainment Weekly that the cast would be cut down by the new showrunners, though McCord was assured she would be back. Trevor Donovan was the first cast member to be dropped as a series regular for the fourth season, although, he will return as a guest star for five episodes in the Fall. Manish Dayal will be returning to the series in a recurring role as Ivy's dying husband, Raj. Donovan will be the only series regular dropped from the series. Five new recurring characters will be introduced in the Fall. Austin, described as a charming and hunky cowboy and the son of a country music superstar. Holly, Naomi's rival at California University. Jeremy, a student at CU who forges an immediate connection with Annie, but may have an ulterior motive. Jane, a young widow and love-interest for Liam, and Leila, Navid's younger and trouble making sister. Producers are also looking to cast Navid's uncle, Amal who was also his father's business partner. He is described as charming on the surface, but a bad guy and somebody "you don't want to mess with." Kristina Apgar, Megalyn Echikunwoke and Justin Deeley were later cast as Jane, Holly and Austin. Stephen Amell also reported that he signed to appear on the show for at least two or more episodes playing Jim Conrad who will get involved with Liam's life. Josh Zuckerman will return as Naomi's boyfriend, Max, for a handful of episodes. Cameron Goodman also secured a recurring spot role, playing Bree a college student who convince Annie to work as a professional escort. Brooklyn-based rapper, Theophilus London, made a guest appearance while performing at Naomi's College Kick-Off party in her new mansion, in the season premiere. Drew Seeley was cast in the series, but was later replaced by Supernatural actor Matt Cohen in the role of Jeremy. Freddie Smith will not return as Teddy's boyfriend, Marco, as their relationship ended over the summer. Former Buffy the Vampire Slayer star, Sarah Hagan, will play Alana, a member of the sorority Naomi joined in a recurring role. R&B singer, Brandy Norwood will have a major arc in the fourth season. Her character Marissa Harris-Young, who is due to make her debut in October, is said to be a young politician hoping to get elected to congress. She is running against the conservative uncle of Teddy. In order to increase her chances, Marissa hires Silver to make a campaign video aimed at young people. Sean Wing has landed a role as a recurring guest star. His character Nick is described as a "scruffy-handsome" graduate student with an interest in photography. Nick, who works for National Geographic, is also said to be charming and a traveler. He ends up falling for one of the female characters, but she is already in a relationship. Kellie Pickler is set to make her acting debut as Sally, the country-singing cousin of local cowboy Austin. Former Gigantic star, Ryan Rottman, will guest star as Shane, a smart, handsome gay 20-something who is confident in his identity and is committed to fighting for marriage equality. Chris McKenna has signed on for multiple episodes to play Patrick, a businessman who falls for Annie, he is described as "rich, powerful and very charming". Former Nikita star, Tiffany Hines has landed a recurring role as a police officer called Kat. Jersey Shore's Vinny Guadagnino will guest-star as a celebrity who gets involved in a high-stakes poker game with Liam. Billy Ray Cyrus has been cast as Austin's father, Judd Ridge, a country and western star. His episode will air in November. E! Online confirmed that Eureka alum Niall Matter would join the cast as Greg, a new love-interest for Silver. Janice Dickinson will appear as herself in a November episode, as a famous fashion celebrity judging student competition.

Original Beverly Hills, 90210 star Dina Meyer appeared as a modeling agent who takes a special interest in Liam's career. Michelle Hurd will appear as a guest star playing Rachel, Naomi's boss and Holly's mother. Arielle Kebbel will join the series in a recurring role in December as Vanessa, a girl with a rather promiscuous past who still, occasionally finds herself making risky choices. Matt Lanter hinted that Vanessa maybe a new love interest for his character Liam, "She may be Liam's next love interest. It's going to be fun. It's kind of a mystery," he said in an interview with E!. Arielle Kebbel's character is described as a "female Liam". Entertainment Weekly reported that Sara Foster would return for three episodes in the latter half of the season, as Naomi's sister Jen Clark. Nick Zano was also cast as Preston Hillingsbrook, a playboy with a lot of cash to blow as the heir to his family's fortune. It was revealed that his character will first become friends with Annie, but will also get romantically involved with another woman on the show. La Toya Jackson will guest star in an episode which will air in February. Her character is said to be a brilliant and powerful music executive, who ends up forcing Dixon to make a tough decision by making him a great offer. Step Up 2 actor Robert Hoffman will guest star Caleb, a student at seminary school studying to become a priest. When Hoffman's character isn't studying he's a laid back surfer, passionate about community service. He won't make his appearance until a March episode. Pretty Little Liars cast Yani Gellman was cast in a multiple guest arc playing the bad boy Diego, the new potential love interest of Ivy Sullivan. American Idol season 10 runner-up, Haley Reinhart, will guest star as herself. Reinhart will appear in the March 27 episode, performing at a showcase. She will also sing the first single off her debut album during her appearance.

Trevor Donovan will return to the series towards the end of the season. Tristan Wilds will take a break from the series due to illness. He will be absent from the final episodes of the season as his character heads on a music tour. Manish Dayal, whose last appearance was in the 10th episode, will return in the 19th episode titled "The Heart Will Go On".

=== Storylines ===
The fourth season will follow the group after high school. Some will head to college, while some will begin their careers, while all trying to maintain their friendships and create new ones. Matt Lanter said of the transition to college, "There's real world possibilities that open up when you go to college now, so I'm really looking forward to the stories that they come up with and how they can be exciting in a real life way rather than just walking down the school hallways." It was announced that a major male character will develop a drug habit. Later revealed to be Dixon. It has also been revealed that only one series regular will be attending college full-time. Executive producer Patti Carr revealed that Naomi will buy an over-the-top mansion that she'll turn into a sorority house where friends such as Annie, Silver and newlyweds Ivy and Raj will live. It has also been revealed that Dixon won't be going to college, he will instead pursue a music career. In the "Rock the Vote" themed episode, Naomi will throw a lavish registration party at her mansion. Navid and Silver will be forced to act as parents and look after Navid's sister, who decides to stay in L.A. when her family moves to Switzerland. Navid will also hire Silver to work for him, so they can spend more time together.

Kristin Dos Santos reported that Annie will begin a new profession after Marla's family contest the will left to her. Michael Ausiello later reported that she will become a professional escort. Liam will become a male model this season. Teddy will get "married" (Same-sex marriage is not recognized in Nevada.) to his boyfriend, Shane in the Las Vegas episode, scheduled to air in early November. Adrianna will reignite her musical dreams, and attempt to get her baby back. Matt Lanter revealed in an interview with Entertainment Weekly that the fall finale will end with a life or death situation with Liam. He said, "We're not really sure what happens to him or if he returns, how he returns." EW confirmed that Jen Clark will return for three episodes. Her debut will begin with a visit at the end of episode 16, with baby Jacques in tow. Jen coerces Naomi into helping her find a rich, eligible bachelor, but the guy ends up having eyes for Naomi, instead. Arielle Kebbel who portrays Vanessa, the girl who ran into Liam, told "As the season continues, Liam and Vanessa get closer and learn they have similar troubled pasts." She also added, "I think that brings them closer together. Instead of judging each other's pasts, they see the good in one another and encourage change for the future."

At the end of the mid-season premiere, Silver discovered that the man she has been dating is also the man who adopted Adrianna's baby.

== Reception ==
The season opened to a 0.9 Adults 18–49 rating, even with last season's premiere.

== DVD release ==
The DVD release of season four was released after the season has completed broadcast on television. It has been released in Regions 1, 2 and 4. As well as every episode from the season, the DVD release features bonus material such as deleted scenes, gag reels and behind-the-scenes featurettes.

90210: The Fourth Season
Set details			Special features
24 episodes; 1008 minutes (Region 1); 1008 minutes (Region 2); 990 (Region 4); 6-disc set; 1.85:1 aspect ratio; Languages: English (Dolby Digital 2.0 Surround); Subtitles: English, Danish, Dutch, Finnish, Norwegian and Spanish (Region 1); English, Arabic, Dutch, Norwegian, Swedish, English For The Hearing Impaired (Regions 2 and 4)			Audio commentaries: Set Tours: Dxon's Apartment; Namoi's Mansion; Offshore; The Student Union; Dressing Heads: Hair and Makeup of 90210; Creating Beats: The Music of 90210; Season in Review: Freshman Year; I Don't Want You Anymore Official Music Video; Gag Reel; Deleted Scenes
Release dates			Audio commentaries: Set Tours: Dxon's Apartment; Namoi's Mansion; Offshore; The Student Union; Dressing Heads: Hair and Makeup of 90210; Creating Beats: The Music of 90210; Season in Review: Freshman Year; I Don't Want You Anymore Official Music Video; Gag Reel; Deleted Scenes
United States	United Kingdom	Australia	Audio commentaries: Set Tours: Dxon's Apartment; Namoi's Mansion; Offshore; The Student Union; Dressing Heads: Hair and Makeup of 90210; Creating Beats: The Music of 90210; Season in Review: Freshman Year; I Don't Want You Anymore Official Music Video; Gag Reel; Deleted Scenes
October 2, 2012	October 1, 2012	March 6, 2013	Audio commentaries: Set Tours: Dxon's Apartment; Namoi's Mansion; Offshore; The Student Union; Dressing Heads: Hair and Makeup of 90210; Creating Beats: The Music of 90210; Season in Review: Freshman Year; I Don't Want You Anymore Official Music Video; Gag Reel; Deleted Scenes
