= 90210 season 2 =

90210
- Season 2
- DVD cover
- Starring: Rob Estes; Shenae Grimes; Tristan Wilds; AnnaLynne McCord; Jessica Stroup; Michael Steger; Jessica Lowndes; Ryan Eggold; Lori Loughlin; Matt Lanter
- No. of episodes: 22

Release
- Original network: The CW
- Original release: September 8, 2009 – May 18, 2010

Season chronology
- ← Previous; Season 1 Next → Season 3

The second season of 90210, an American television series, premiered in the U.S. on September 8, 2009 and ended on May 18, 2010. The season picks up at the end of summer after the events of last season's dramatic prom party. Rob Estes, Shenae Grimes, Tristan Wilds, AnnaLynne McCord, Ryan Eggold, Jessica Stroup, Michael Steger, Jessica Lowndes, and Lori Loughlin all return as series regulars from season one, while Dustin Milligan was released from his contract for "creative reasons".

New executive producer Rebecca Sinclair said she felt the show needed a "complete overhaul". She hired new writing staff and had new sets built. She was also quoted as saying, "If Gossip Girl is about youth in New York, I want to [make 90210] about youth in L.A. and Beverly Hills." Sinclair also revealed that she wanted to rely less on cast members from the original Beverly Hills, 90210, though Jennie Garth and Ann Gillespie did return for a limited time.

The first episode was seen by 2.56 million viewers, the most watched episode of the show since January 2009.

== Synopsis ==
This season follows the same characters as they begin their junior year. Three months after prom, Annie begins to endure the consequences of her hit and run, but soon becomes undone as it's learned that her victim's nephew goes to West Bev. Having finally moved past Silver, Dixon finds a new but older girlfriend. Kelly and Silver are informed of some upsetting news regarding their mother. Jen continues to manipulate and exploit Naomi in order to get financial independence. Liam has returned to Beverly Hills after spending the summer at Military school, but has a plan of revenge for his stepfather and Jen, Naomi's older sister. Two new students enroll into the school-Teddy Montgomery, a tennis player and the son of a big Hollywood Movie director, and Ivy Sullivan, Surfer, and a daughter of a popular record label. Deborah and Harry's marriage is on thin ice as the new school year starts.

== Cast and characters ==
=== Main ===
- Rob Estes as Harry Wilson
- Shenae Grimes as Annie Wilson
- Tristan Wilds as Dixon Wilson
- AnnaLynne McCord as Naomi Clark
- Ryan Eggold as Ryan Matthews
- Jessica Stroup as Erin Silver
- Michael Steger as Navid Shirazi
- Jessica Lowndes as Adrianna Tate-Duncan
- Matt Lanter as Liam Court
- Lori Loughlin as Debbie Wilson

=== Recurring ===
- Trevor Donovan as Teddy Montgomery
- Zachary Ray Sherman as Jasper Herman
- Gillian Zinser as Ivy Sullivan
- Sara Foster as Jennifer "Jen" Clark
- Rumer Willis as Gia Mannetti
- Blake Hood as Mark Driscoll
- Kelly Lynch as Laurel Cooper
- Mekia Cox as Sasha
- John Schneider as Jeffrey Sarkossian
- Hal Ozsan as Miles Cannon
- Diego Boneta as Javier Luna
- Alex Mckenna as Cat

=== Special guest stars ===
- Jennie Garth as Kelly Taylor
- Ann Gillespie as Jackie Taylor

== Episodes ==
No. overall	No. in season	Title	Directed by	Written by	Original release date	U.S. viewers (millions)
25	1	"To New Beginnings!"	Stuart Gillard	Rebecca Sinclair	September 8, 2009	2.56
Wanting to keep the secret of her hit-and-run accident hidden at any cost, Annie has spent the summer avoiding everybody, including her parents after they move into a new house. Meanwhile, all the other students (Naomi, Silver, Dixon, etc.) were forced to attend summer school after Annie phoned the police about the after-prom party at Naomi's house, which makes them, especially Naomi, dislike Annie even further. Dixon and Annie's relationship suffers more when Dixon believes Naomi's claim that she thinks Annie slept with Liam. Annie goes into a further decline when she finds out that the person she ran into, died. Naomi, Silver and Adrianna have formed a bond and spend their last few days of the summer vacation at the Beverly Hills Beach Club. There, Adrianna runs into Teddy Montgomery, her ex-boyfriend and a tennis pro who is a new student at West Beverly. Dixon and Silver also decide to get back together, but when Dixon finds out that Ethan kissed Silver before he went away, Dixon naturally does not take it well decides to break up with Silver for good. Meanwhile, Annie gets drunk with senior Mark Driscoll and fools around with him topless in Navid's cabana, which was supposed to be for him and Adrianna, but Adrianna decides to wait, not wanting to rush things. On the first day of school, Mark shows his friends a naked picture he took of Annie, which Naomi gets her hands on.
26	2	"To Sext or Not to Sext"	Tony Wharmby	Jennie Snyder Urman	September 15, 2009	2.31
Following the last episode, Naomi does her best to make Annie's life the worst it could be by sending the nude photo of her to everyone. Soon Annie is forced to lie and say she slept with Liam, which causes more distance between her and Dixon, along with their parents. Silver also decides she will try to win Dixon back. Meanwhile, Ryan starts to wonder if his relationship with Jen is the right thing for him. Liam returns to West Beverly and tries to apologize to Naomi for being unfaithful. While Liam denies sleeping with Annie that night, he still refuses to tell Naomi who he did have sex with after he sees Jen at Naomi's side. Later, Jen gets Liam into trouble by telling his mother and stepfather a fabricated story about him stalking Naomi in order to keep him way from her. Liam then joins the school surf team with Dixon to take out his frustration of the problems he's facing. Naomi continues not to believe Liam's claims that he did not have sex with Annie. Dixon also continues to be skeptic with both Liam and Annie's claims not to have hooked up. The crafty Jen takes advantage of the friction between Naomi and Annie in order to manipulate Naomi to do what she can to get back at Annie.
27	3	"Sit Down, You're Rocking the Boat"	Janice Cooke	Mark Driscoll	September 22, 2009	2.00
Teddy invites most of the gang on his father's yacht for a day cruise to get to know everyone better. Annie does her best to prove it was Naomi who sent out the naked photo of her to the entire school. When her parents try to talk to Annie about her situation, it causes more tension since Annie still does not want to talk about what is bothering her, leading Harry to confide in Kelly about the family's problems. Meanwhile Dixon meets a new girl in a bar, a local DJ named Sasha, but he lies about his age to get to know her, which makes Silver jealous. Navid begins to doubt about where his relationship with Adrianna is heading. Adrianna begins to show more appreciation to Teddy, while he continues to rebuff Naomi's further attempts at flirtation. Liam, frustrated and disgusted at Annie and Naomi's feud, confines himself to his garage where he begins working on a project.
28	4	"The Porn King"	James L. Conway	Maria Maggenti & Jordan Budde	September 29, 2009	2.21
Annie's new and confident mood changes when she finds out that Jasper Herman, the moody and antisocial nephew of the man she hit on prom night, goes to the same school as she does. Navid continues working at the schools news channel, The Blaze, and assigns Silver and Gia to interview Jasper for a news piece about his uncle who was a student at West Beverly, and also left behind a $100,000 inheritance to the school, but Jasper refuses to say anything. Meanwhile, Dixon borrows Navid's car so that he and Sasha can go away for the weekend and continues to lie to her about his real age. On the trip home, a flat tire leads to the discovery of a car trunk full of pornography, belonging to Navid's father, which leads to Dixon telling more lies to Sasha. Navid continues to grow insanely jealous over Adrianna's friendship with Teddy, with whom she confides about her uncertainty with Navid. Elsewhere, Liam continues to find a way to get revenge on Jen and make her reveal the truth to Naomi about her seducing him that night of the prom party. He later discovers that Jen scammed a fortune out of her French husband, whom she only married for the money.
29	5	"Environmental Hazards"	Jamie Babbit	Padma L. Atluri & Jennie Snyder Urman	October 6, 2009	2.09
When Naomi is told she might not get into the university she wants to, she conjures a plan to get accepted by receiving tutoring from the dean's son, Richard. Naomi soon finds herself drawn to Richard's roommate, Jamie. Meanwhile, Silver gets a shock when she runs into her mother, Jackie, at Adrianna's AA meeting. When Sasha finds out Dixon is still a junior in high school, she breaks up with him only to get back together soon after. When Adrianna and Navid go out on a double date with Teddy and his new girlfriend, it ends with a secret kiss between Adrianna and Teddy. Features Irish band The Script performing live We Cry.
30	6	"Wild Alaskan Salmon"	Liz Friedlander	Mark Driscoll	October 13, 2009	2.25
Adrianna breaks up with Navid and turns to Teddy, but realizes she may have made a mistake when Teddy tells her that he does not do relationships. Meanwhile, Jen continues to use Naomi in any way she can by playing on her emotions and asks Naomi for a large amount of cash so that she can secretly purchase a racehorse. Annie and Jasper become close when he rescues her from a bad situation after Mark tries to force himself upon her. Elsewhere, Kelly and Silver deal with devastating news about their mother dying from cancer. Kelly refuses to associate herself with their mother and her behavior, Silver feels differently and wants to re-bond with Jackie. Harry, seeking to get away from problems at home with Debbie's anger and jealousy, accompanies Ryan to a bar for some guy time and attempts to be his wing man when Ryan wants to move on from Jen.
31	7	"Unmasked"	J. Miller Tobin	Jennie Snyder Urman	October 20, 2009	2.25
Dixon ends his relationship with Sasha, which she takes very badly, and works on a plan to get him back. More tensions surface between Harry and Debbie over his friendship with Kelly. Meanwhile, Silver is keen to help her mother through her terminal illness and support her, while Kelly isn't willing to forgive Jackie for what she did to both of them. While dealing with schoolwork and caring after school for Jackie, Silver is paired with Teddy for a class project where they find they have more in common when he tells her that his mother too died from cancer. While the rest of the gang attend a Halloween costume party at the beach club, Annie and Jasper's relationship is put to the test when he attempts to convince her to steal a car while shooting a scene for his student film. Naomi continues her relationship with Richard, but still continues to flirt with Jamie. Elsewhere, Liam meets and clashes with Ivy Sullivan, an outgoing tomboy and the new member of the school surf team.
32	8	"Women's Intuition"	Stuart Gillard	Rebecca Sinclair	November 3, 2009	1.92
Dixon tells his parents about his situation with Sasha, prompting Debbie to investigate it. Meanwhile, Navid and Gia investigate drug use at West Beverly, leading them to Annie's new boyfriend, Jasper, whom they suspect to be a drug dealer, which Jasper openly denies. After Annie privately asks Jasper if the rumors of him being a drug dealer are true, rather than give a straight answer, he suddenly becomes very defensive and angry and threatens to break up with her for not trusting him, leading Annie to believe his claims that he isn't (which is similar to Annie's own plight over the false rumors of her seducing Liam), but Navid doesn't. Worried that Adrianna will relapse into drugs, Naomi and Silver enlist Navid's assistance to talk to her, but he is too consumed by his ego and jealousy to care about her anymore. Meanwhile, Liam accompanies Teddy and Ivy when they go out to watch a rock concert. Ryan and Jen also attend the same concert, and Navid receives some dating advice. When Jen sees Liam at the concert, she tells Ryan another fabricated story about Liam making a pass at her in order to keep him more isolated. Guest stars Samantha Ronson and Pharrell Williams with his group N.E.R.D. perform.
33	9	"A Trip to the Moon"	Rick Rosenthal	Paul Sciarotta & Jennie Snyder Urman	November 10, 2009	2.06
Teddy helps Jackie organize a surprise half-birthday celebration for Silver. Navid witnesses Adrianna buying drugs from Jasper, forcing him to confront Jasper, who continues to deny that he's a drug dealer, but he also soon threatens Navid to stop investigating him. Meanwhile, Dixon is determined to speak to Sasha about her miscarriage, forcing Harry and Debbie to reveal that she lied about being pregnant. After getting into a fight on the beach during surf practice, an angry Liam finally confides in Dixon, Teddy, and Ivy about his encounter with Jen and wants to devise a plan to expose Jen for what she really is. Elsewhere, Annie and Jasper profess their love for each other and decide to take their relationship to "the next level".
34	10	"To Thine Own Self Be True"	Mike Listo	Ben Dougan	November 17, 2009	2.10
Annie brings Jasper home for dinner, although it does not go as planned when Dixon tells their parents about Jasper's drug dealing. Dixon, still alienated and upset with his entire family, especially with Debbie, spends time with Ivy and Teddy to work on a plan for Liam to reveal the truth to Naomi about Jen. Navid confronts Adrianna about her renewed drug use, but this time, she rudely tells him off for turning his back on her. Meanwhile, Kelly tries to heals the wounds with her terminally sick mother who is hospitalized with Silver at her bedside. Naomi is forced to reveal her true motivations for getting close to Richard when he and his mother catch her making out with his roommate, Jamie. Elsewhere, Ryan and Jen go on an overnight camping trip. After an awkward dinner, Debbie and Harry tell Annie to stay away from Jasper because they believe Navid's claim about Jasper being a drug dealer due to Jasper's odd behavior. At the end, Navid is shown being pushed down the stairs at school by Jasper.
35	11	"And Away They Go!"	Harry Sinclair	Rebecca Sinclair & Natalie Krinsky	December 1, 2009	2.15
Liam, Dixon, and Ivy learn that Naomi and Jen will be attending the races at the Santa Clarita Racetrack to watch the horse that Jen bought with Naomi's money, and the three of them orchestrate a plan to expose Jen to Naomi. Ryan also accompanies Jen and Naomi to the races, and inadvertently learns how Jen acquired the racehorse used to win the race. Meanwhile, Annie and Jasper sneak out to go on a Saturday date even though Harry and Debbie have grounded her. Navid wakes up in the hospital after his "accident" with no memory of who pushed him down the flight of stairs. Adrianna visits Navid and following her conversation with him, makes a life-changing decision about her addiction to pills. Elsewhere, Silver and Teddy bond over the loss of their mothers and unexpectedly get close to each other.
36	12	"Winter Wonderland"	David Warren	Jennie Snyder Urman	December 8, 2009	1.91
Navid asks Adrianna to tell the principal about Jasper and his drug dealing when Navid becomes certain it was Jasper that pushed him down the stairs. Annie goes to the school's annual Winter Dance with Jasper, where she is later confronted by her former friends about Jasper's drug dealing. Annie confronts Jasper, only for him to reveal that he somehow knows all about the hit-and-run accident that killed his uncle. Meanwhile, Teddy comes clean about his feelings for Silver, but when Silver sees him with another girl (who turns out to be his sister), she confides in Dixon and they share a kiss. Meanwhile, Naomi and Liam attempt to rekindle their relationship. Ivy then realizes that Liam likes Naomi and decides to help them get back together. Soon, Liam finally shows Naomi the project he was working on in his garage.Debbie tries to rekindle her relationship with Dixon by taking him out miniature golfing.
37	13	"Rats and Heroes"	Stuart Gillard	Mark Driscoll & Padma L. Atluri	March 9, 2010	1.70
Naomi returns from her winter vacation in St. Bart's and is excited to spend time with Liam. Adrianna and Gia bond when they meet at an AA meeting and they later share a kiss at the beach club. Navid tells Dixon about a rash plan of his to frame Jasper for drug possession during a school drug inspection probe by planting an ounce of cocaine in Jasper's locker in which Navid wants Dixon's help to get the combination to Jasper's locker from the school office. Navid and Dixon manage to get the locker combination and plant the narcotics in Jasper's locker, despite Dixon's lack of approval to Navid's underhanded scheme. But at the end, Navid's plan goes horribly wrong when the cocaine that Navid buys and plants in Jasper's locker vanishes... and reappears in Navid's locker, which leads to Navid getting arrested and suspended for drug possession (implying that Jasper found the drugs first and planted them in Navid's locker... somehow having Navid's locker combination this whole time... with no one the wiser). Meanwhile, Dixon tries to get back with Silver while she continues to hide her feelings for Teddy. When Annie decides to break up with Jasper, he threatens to tell the authorities about her hit-and-run accident. Harry and Debbie run into Kelly at a school event, forcing the jealous Debbie to confront her about her crush on her husband. This leads to Debbie trying to set Kelly up with her yoga instructor, Kai, who seems more interested in Debbie. Note: This is the last episode to feature Jennie Garth as a recurring guest star.
38	14	"Girl Fight!"	Fred Gerber	Rebecca Sinclair & Jennie Snyder Urman	March 16, 2010	1.84
Annie's friends soon become suspicious because she continues to date Jasper, while he blackmails her with proof of her hit-and-run. Meanwhile, Naomi asks Ivy for help in connecting with Liam, which eventually causes a fight between the two. Adrianna and Gia's close friendship continues to develop when the two of them throw a pity party for themselves, which results in Gia's former girlfriend attempting to win her back. Silver and Dixon decide not to get back together and just be friends. Silver and Teddy try to make a relationship work between them after Dixon reveals that he intentionally tried to keep them apart. Ivy goes to her hippie and outgoing mother, Laurel, for comfort after Liam chooses Naomi over her. Ryan also attempts to date Ivy's mother, Laurel, while still trying to get over his failed romance with Jen. At the end, Dixon's birth mother turns up.
39	15	"What's Past Is Prologue"	Norman Buckley	Daniel Arkin	March 23, 2010	1.51
Gia gets Adrianna to audition for the lead singer in a new all-girl rock band and reluctantly admits she has a crush on her. Dixon's birth mother, Dana, tries to forge a new relationship with her son. Meanwhile, Silver becomes jealous of how much female attention Teddy receives on their first real date. Navid returns to school from his suspension to find that Naomi has fully taken over The Blaze and even started a gossip segment, which he adamantly opposes. At his friends persuasion, Navid reluctantly agrees to give up on trying to get revenge against Jasper for framing him for drug possession and instead decides to move on by getting back into the dating scene by asking out the new Blaze volunteer, Lila, who turns out to be the bass player in Adrianna's band. As Annie re-establishes friendships with Naomi, Silver, and Adrianna, she also realizes that Jasper has begun stalking her, and is frustrated that she cannot confide in anyone about what is going on because she fears that someone will find out about her hit-and-run. Debbie confides in her yoga instructor, Kai, about Dixon's birth mother.
40	16	"Clark Raving Mad"	Stuart Gillard	Tod Himmel	March 30, 2010	1.48
A new Blaze faculty advisor, Mr. Cannon, joins the staff at West Beverly and who immediately gets on the wrong side of Naomi. After Naomi humiliated him by making up rumors about him sexually harassing her. Meanwhile, Adrianna confides in Naomi and Silver about her feelings for Gia, and afterwards, Adrianna confronts Gia and decides to ask her out on a date. Teddy decides to test Silver's commitment to him by attempting to make her jealous by flirting with random girls. Dixon and his birth mother, Dana, continue to bond while she lures him into her casual habit of sports betting. Dixon immediately becomes hooked on gambling and begins placing bets on-line as well as in public. Dana sees Kai make a pass at Debbie. Liam catches his stepfather with another woman and confronts him with a fist-to-the-face which leads to Liam leaving home when his weak-willed mother refuses to leave her cheating husband. At the end, Jasper calls Annie insinuating he is about to commit suicide, which leaves her feeling guilty.
41	17	"Sweaty Palms and Weak Knees"	Krishna Rao	Ben Dougan	April 6, 2010	1.33
Dixon and Ivy start to "fake date" when they start to feel left out after seeing Teddy, Silver, Naomi and Liam on a double date at the Beach Club. Meanwhile, Annie visits Jasper in the hospital after he attempts suicide by jumping from the Hollywood sign, and continues to worry that he will tell somebody her secret. As Adrianna continues to rehearse with her new band, the Glorious Steinems, for their big debut at the Beach Club, she and Gia finally make their relationship official. Also, Dixon continues to slide out of control with gambling and Liam encourages Naomi to come forward with her sexual harassment case against Mr. Cannon, which causes her to continue lying.
42	18	"Another, Another Chance"	Millicent Shelton	Scott Weinger	April 13, 2010	1.45
Naomi is forced to testify during her sexual harassment hearing and she later drops a bomb that no one saw coming. Annie tries to forget her relationship with Jasper by going car shopping with Silver. When Annie and Silver drive past the scene of her hit-and-run, the guilt comes rushing back to haunt her. Meanwhile, Dixon and Ivy keep their fake relationship going and decide to take it to the next level. Both Gia and Lila become uncomfortable about Adrianna's friendship with Navid which leads to Gia cheating on Adrianna. Ryan keeps dating Ivy's troubled mother, Laurel, who lures him into her dangerous world of pot-smoking and free-love. At the end, Liam receives a surprise visit from his estranged father, who was recently released from prison and wants to re-connect with his son.
43	19	"Multiple Choices"	Liz Friedlander	Paul Sciarrotta	April 27, 2010	1.54
As a result of falsely accusing her faculty adviser of sexual harassment, Naomi is required to complete community service and publicly apologizes to her peers for the trouble she has caused. While the gang prepares for the SATs, Silver confronts Teddy about his decision to skip college and focus on his tennis career. Things soon grow more tense when Silver meets his movie star father, Spence, at a tennis match. Liam and his father, Finn, reconnect and attempt to rebuild their relationship. Navid and Dixon host an underground gambling party that results in Dixon owning over $6,000 to card shark Mark Driscoll (the same West Bev student who tried to date-rape Annie months earlier). When Debbie reveals to Harry that she kissed another man, the two are finally forced to discuss their recent problems. Annie overhears their conversation and turns to Liam for support. Just when Naomi thinks her life is getting back on track, Jen returns to Beverly Hills with news that she and her French husband are the new owners of the Beverly Hills Beach Club.
44	20	"Meet the Parent"	Stuart Gillard	Jessica Chaffin	May 4, 2010	1.43
Naomi and Jen's personal conflict escalates as Jen moves back into Naomi's house and threatens to evict her, but Naomi counter-attacks by telling Jen's secrets to her French husband, Olivier. Meanwhile, Teddy invites Silver for dinner at his house so she can become better acquainted with his father. Things don't go as well as Teddy hoped due to the vast differences between Silver and Spence. Spence then tells Teddy he disapproves of him dating her. Navid realizes he still has feelings for Adrianna after she asks for his help to write a song for pop star Javier whom Ivy's mother, Laurel, wants to record a demo tape with him. This leads to Navid breaking up with Lila. Dixon invites Ivy over at his house for dinner when Harry and Debbie are out, but when they suddenly come back, Dixon's date turns out to be better in an unusual manner. Elsewhere, Annie confides in Liam and comforts him after his father, Finn, leaves town with the money Liam gave to him that was supposed to help Finn start his own business. Ryan starts to drink again and soon runs into Jen.
45	21	"Javianna"	James L. Conway	Jennie Snyder Urman	May 11, 2010	1.45
Adrianna's new romance with pop star Javier continues to blossom, while Navid continues to work up enough courage to tell her how he feels. Jen takes control of Naomi's finances and puts her on a tight budget. Without her credit cards, Naomi is too distracted to realize that Liam is in need of emotional support to deal with the departure of his father, so he turns to Annie for comfort. Despite Spence's suggestion, Teddy refuses to end his relationship with Silver, and the two decide to spend the night together. Meanwhile, Ivy invites Dixon to spend the summer in Australia with her and Laurel, but the idea doesn't go over well with his parents. Harry and Debbie's marital problems escalate when she finds out that Harry has been hiding Dixon's troubles and gambling habit from her. Also, Jasper returns to resolve things with Annie over their ended relationship.
46	22	"Confessions"	Rebecca Sinclair	Rebecca Sinclair	May 18, 2010	1.61
After ending things with Naomi, Liam invites Annie to sail with him on his boat. After seeing Liam's bravery in confessing about his theft from his stepfather's coin collection, Annie finds the courage to confess to her parents about her hit-and-run accident. Jasper gets jealous over Liam and Annie's new closeness and sets fire to Liam's boat, leading to a brutal fight between Liam and Jasper on the docks where Liam practically beats Jasper to death. Meanwhile, Silver confesses to Teddy about Spence bribing her to break up with him. Adrianna's torn on her decision to leave school to go tour with Javier as she and Navid get back together. Dixon and Ivy go through a rough patch after he tells her about kissing Silver, but the real disappointment comes when she finds out that he can't go to Australia with her. Naomi learns that Jen is five months pregnant and that Ryan is the father after Naomi steals a copy of a paternity test which she sends to him. After Jen declines Ryan's offer to be there for their child, he gets drunk and causes damage to the West Beverly school signpost when he crashes into it with his car. When Harry is threatened by Mark over covering up for his and Dixon's break in at the school, Harry decides to come clean to the school board and it results in him getting fired from his job. Dixon sneaks away to Australia with Ivy during Harry and Debbie's confrontation. At the end, Mr. Cannon presumably rapes Naomi as she realizes the desperation of the situation because she has already falsely accused him of harassment before.

== Production ==
New inter title introduced in the season premiere.

With the reveal of The CW's 2009-10 schedule, it was announced the series would be returning to its original Tuesday 8:00 pm Eastern/7:00 pm Central, as a lead-in to Melrose Place. 90210 is produced by CBS Television Studios with executive producer Rebecca Sinclair.

When Sinclair took over the series, she said she felt the show needed a "complete overhaul" and hired new writing staff, a new producing director, a new DP, built new sets and new wardrobe for all the cast. With the takeover, Sinclair also introduced a new inter title and opening credits, the cast list now appears after the sequence has finished. The premiere was written by Sinclair and directed by Stuart Gillard.

=== Cast ===
If Gossip Girl is about youth in New York, I want to [make 90210] about youth in L.A. and Beverly Hills.

— Rebecca Sinclair on a new direction for the series.

New executive producer Rebecca Sinclair said that second season will rely much less on original characters Jennie Garth, Tori Spelling and Shannen Doherty to boost ratings. As part of the changes, the season also promotes Matt Lanter as Liam Court from a recurring character from the 16th episode to a regular character, while character Ethan Ward (Dustin Milligan) was released from his contract due to the producers feeling his character had reached its conclusion.

Trevor Donovan was cast as a charming, tennis prodigy and movie star son who is also Adrianna's first boyfriend. Former Law & Order actress Elisabeth Röhm signed on for at least one episode, as a socialite that locked horns with Naomi. Rumer Willis guest starred for several episodes as Gia, a "punky, cute lesbian who isn't afraid to speak her mind." On July 20, 2009, E! Online reported that actor John Schneider had been cast as Liam's plastic surgeon stepfather.

Jennie Garth signed up to return as her character Kelly Taylor. Ann Gillespie also signed on for a multiple episode arc for the character to mend the broken relationship with her daughters.

Gillian Zinser was cast as Ivy Sullivan, a "tomboy surfer chick" and Kelly Lynch was cast as her mother, Laurel Cooper, a former hippie who believes in "free love, the environment, the power of music, legalized marijuana and her daughter Ivy, whom she sees as her greatest triumph". EW's Michael Ausiello announced that former Dawson's Creek actor Hal Ozsan had been cast, in a recurring role, as a faculty adviser for school's paper. TV Guide confirmed that former Gilmore Girls actor Scott Patterson had been cast to play Jack Court, Liam's ex-con father who opens a tackle shop and would appear in multiple episodes. Ryan O'Neal was later cast to play Spence Montgomery, Teddy's dysfunctional father, in a multiple episode run that started in April 2010. Travis Van Winkle was cast as, Jamie, as "football/frat" student at California University for "several episodes".

=== Story ===
The second season focuses on the West Beverly Hills High group as they begin their junior year and go through dramatic changes and surprises that will change their lives. Adrianna's personal life becomes as dramatic as any role she could hope to play; Annie, the good girl from Kansas, is now lost among people she used to trust; Dixon, her brother, struggles to find his own voice; Liam, the troubled New York visitor who abhors the decadent materialistic world of Beverly Hills and Naomi, who is at odds with her sister and soon finds a worse enemy. New students join the drama. Silver gets a visit from the past.

== Reception ==
Season 2 premiered to 2.44 million viewers and a 1.2 Adults 18-49 rating. 90210 was the #1 in the percentage increase for the 18-49 demo between March 22 and March 28, increasing from a 0.7 Live+Same Day rating to a 1.1 rating. DVR ratings for the show sometimes double its broadcast ratings. The second season currently has an average user score of 7.4 out of 10 on Metacritic indicating "generally favorable" reviews. This is a higher average user score than the first season.

== DVD release ==
The DVD release of season two was released after the season has completed broadcast on television. It has been released in Regions 1, 2 and 4. As well as every episode from the season, the DVD release features bonus material such as deleted scenes, gag reels and behind-the-scenes featurettes.

90210: The Second Season
Set details			Special features
22 episodes; 870 minutes (Region 1); 869 minutes (Region 2); 869 minutes (Region 4); 6-disc set; 2.35:1 aspect ratio; Languages: English (Dolby Digital 2.0 Surround); Subtitles: English, Danish, Dutch, Finnish, Norwegian and Spanish (Region 1); English, Arabic, Dutch, Norwegian, Swedish, English For The Hearing Impaired (Regions 2 and 4)			Audio commentaries: "New Faces, Same Drama"; "From the Hills to the Beach: The Look of 90210"; "Beverly Hills Surf Crew"; "Welcome to the Beach Club"; "Set Tour: Beverly Hills Beach Club"; "Adrianna and Navid"; "Looking Back: 90210, Season 2 In Review"
Release dates			Audio commentaries: "New Faces, Same Drama"; "From the Hills to the Beach: The Look of 90210"; "Beverly Hills Surf Crew"; "Welcome to the Beach Club"; "Set Tour: Beverly Hills Beach Club"; "Adrianna and Navid"; "Looking Back: 90210, Season 2 In Review"
United States	United Kingdom	Australia	Audio commentaries: "New Faces, Same Drama"; "From the Hills to the Beach: The Look of 90210"; "Beverly Hills Surf Crew"; "Welcome to the Beach Club"; "Set Tour: Beverly Hills Beach Club"; "Adrianna and Navid"; "Looking Back: 90210, Season 2 In Review"
August 24, 2010	September 6, 2010	July 21, 2011	Audio commentaries: "New Faces, Same Drama"; "From the Hills to the Beach: The Look of 90210"; "Beverly Hills Surf Crew"; "Welcome to the Beach Club"; "Set Tour: Beverly Hills Beach Club"; "Adrianna and Navid"; "Looking Back: 90210, Season 2 In Review"
