= Jeremy Horton =

Fictional character from Days of Our Lives

- Days of Our Lives character
- Michael Roark as Jeremy Horton
- Portrayed by: Jeremy Allen (1989); Jeffrey Clark (1989); Trevor Donovan (2007); Michael Roark (2025–2026)
- Duration: 1989; 2007; 2025–2026
- First appearance: May 19, 1989
- Last appearance: April 29, 2026
- Created by: Anne Howard Bailey
- Introduced by: Ken Corday and Shelley Curtis (1989); Ken Corday and Stephen Wyman (2007); Ken Corday and Janet Spellman-Drucker (2025)
In-universe information
- Occupation: Pilot; Smuggler; Teacher
- Parents: Mike Horton; Robin Jacobs
- Grandparents: Bill Horton; Laura Horton
- Aunts and uncles: Jennifer Horton; Lucas Roberts
- First cousins: Abigail Deveraux; JJ Deveraux; Will Horton; Allie Horton

Jeremy Horton is a fictional character from Days of Our Lives, an American soap opera. The character was introduced by Ken Corday and Shelley Curtis in 1989; Jeremy Allen and Jeffrey Clark portrayed the role that same year. In 2007, Corday and Stephen Wyman re-introduced the character with Trevor Donovan. Donovan remained in the role for five months. Michael Roark assumed the role when Jeremy returned to Salem in October 2025; he exited the role when Jeremy left in April of the following year.

Jeremy is the son of Mike Horton (Michael T. Weiss/Roark Critchlow) and Robin Jacobs (Derya Ruggles), and the grandson of Bill (Edward Mallory) and Laura Horton (Jaime Lyn Bauer).

== Casting ==
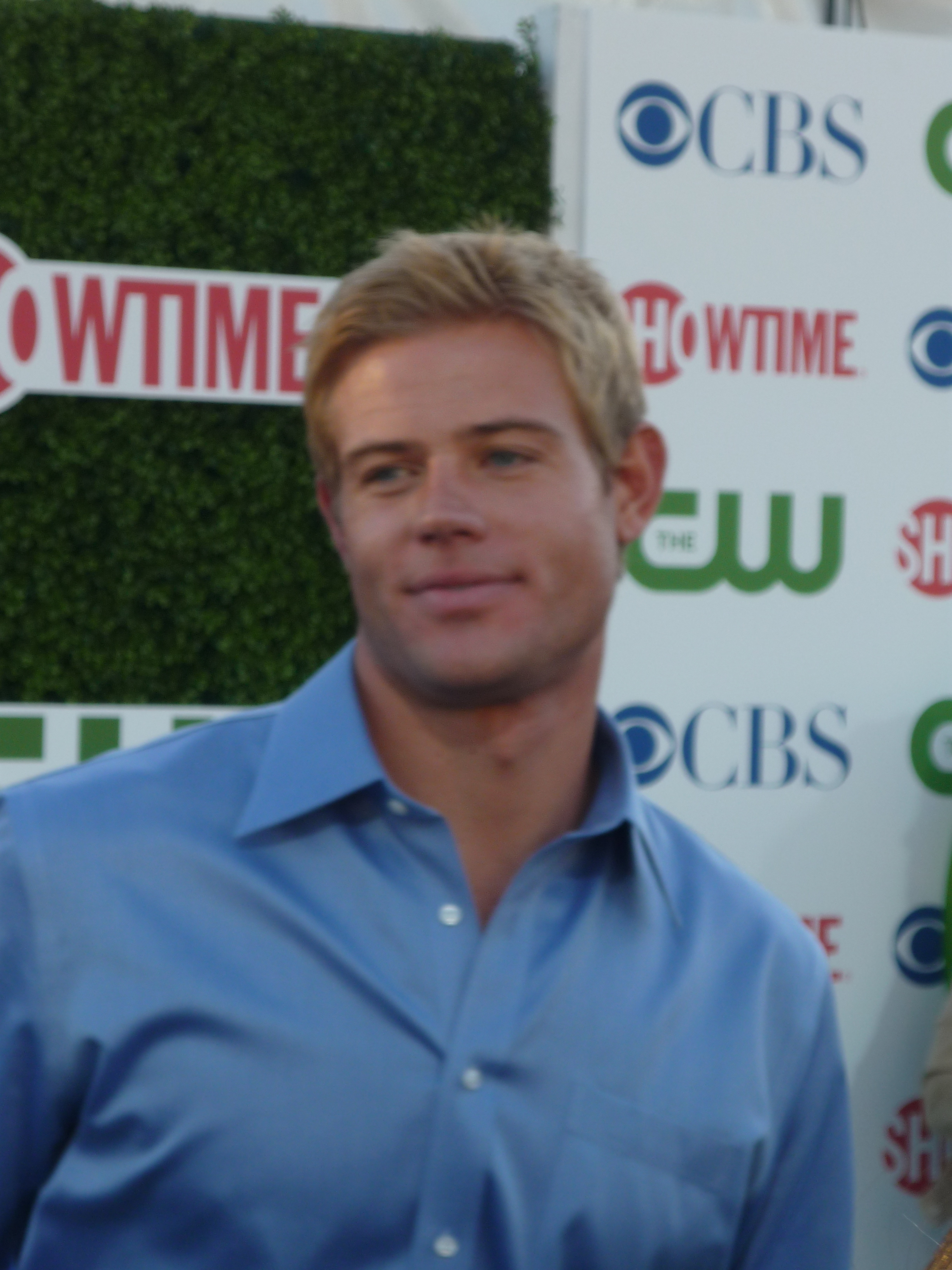
Trevor Donovan was cast as an aged up Jeremy in 2007

In 2007, it was announced Trevor Donovan had been cast as a slightly aged up Jeremy. He made his first appearance on June 1 of that year.

In June 2025, it was announced Michael Roark had joined Days of Our Lives in an undisclosed role and had already begun taping his scenes; he made his debut as Jeremy on October 3. He departed the role on April 29, 2026.

== Storylines ==
Jeremy is introduced when Robin Jacobs (Derya Ruggles) returns to Salem in 1989 revealing to Mike Horton (Michael T. Weiss) she had given birth to their son.

Jeremy (Donovan) returns to Salem in 2007, when Stephanie Johnson (Shelley Hennig) introduces him and his friend, Jett Carver, to her cousin, Chelsea Brady. Jeremy and Chelsea develop an immediate dislike for one another, whereas Jett develops an interest in her. Jeremy and Jett, both pilots, are planning to launch a private flight service, known as Touch the Sky Airlines, in which high rollers from Salem would be flown to Las Vegas once a week. Chelsea and Stephanie agree to become flight attendants and Max Brady (Darin Brooks) joins as a financial backer. Stephanie angers Jeremy and as a result he puts her head underwater in a hot tub, nearly drowning her, revealing his abusive side to Stephanie. However, he covered this up by declaring how much he loves to be with her. Prior to his return to Salem, Jeremy was incarcerated after he had stolen a car for a joyride and shoplifted when he was younger, he was also convicted of fraud because he set up a bogus charity for cancer-afflicted children and used the proceeds on a condominium and sports car. Hoping to set his life on the right track again, Jeremy leaves Salem.

In 2025, Julie reveals to Stephanie (Abigail Klein) that Jeremy (Roark) has a new job and is returning to Salem.
