= Teddy Montgomery =

Fictional character from television series "90210"

- 90210 character
- Trevor Donovan as Teddy Montgomery
- Portrayed by: Trevor Donovan
- Duration: 2009–13
- First appearance: September 8, 2009 (episode 2.01; "To New Beginnings!")
- Last appearance: May 6, 2013 (episode 5.21; "Scandal Royale")
- Created by: Rebecca Sinclair
In-universe information
- Occupation: Student (high school graduate); Former: Tennis player
- Parents: Spence Montgomery (father); Unnamed mother (mother; deceased)
- Siblings: Savanna Montgomery (younger sister)
- Spouse: Shane (husband;invalid)

Theodore "Teddy" Montgomery is a fictional character on The CW television series 90210, the fourth series in the Beverly Hills, 90210 franchise. Portrayed by Trevor Donovan, Teddy Montgomery was introduced in the second season premiere as a recurring character. Where in season three he was upgraded to series regular; however, by season four he was downgraded to a recurring cast member once more. In season 5, he returned in a recurring role.

The character was introduced during the second season of the show. In season two, Teddy was known as a "player" who had commitment problems with many women, including with Adrianna and Silver. During the hiatus between the second and third season, it was revealed that a character from the show would come out as gay. This was later revealed to be Teddy. In the third season, Teddy deals with the many complications and struggles of being gay, which includes harassment, acceptance and relationships. Unlike the second season, where the character had received many negative reviews from both critics and fans, he became extremely popular and well liked in the third season.

== Storylines ==
=== Season 2 ===
At the beginning of the season, Teddy comes to town as Adrianna's ex and childhood friend. Adrianna ends up leaving her boyfriend, Navid, to be with Teddy. But Teddy later tells Adrianna that he isn't the relationship type, leaving Adrianna devastated. Now attending West Bev, Teddy grows close to one of Adrianna's closest friends, Silver, who is struggling to take care of her mother who has cancer. Teddy relates to Silver when he tells her that his mother died of breast cancer when he was younger. As time progresses, Teddy develops feelings for Silver and asks her to the West Bev Winter Wonderland Dance. Silver rejects Teddy's offer due to him playing Adrianna. Teddy later realizes that Silver is the one he wants to be with, so he makes a video and shows it to the entire school during the morning announcements and reveals that Silver is the only girl he would date. Unfortunately, Silver turns him down again. Though, later at the dance Teddy asks Silver to dance but as friends. While dancing Teddy kisses a shocked Silver, and she walks away. Later Silver sees Teddy hugging another girl in the presence of Dixon, who is her ex-boyfriend. Dixon asks Teddy to tell him who the girl was, and Teddy reveals it was in fact his sister, Savanna Montgomery. Dixon runs back to Silver to tell her that the person Teddy was hugging was just another fling in his life. A saddened Silver is then caught off guard when Dixon kisses her, and Teddy manages to spot the two and leaves heartbroken. Silver then tells Dixon the kiss was a mistake and is left interested in only Teddy. Silver tries talking to Teddy, but he tells her that she was right and that they would have never worked due to him being a player. A few weeks later, Teddy's sister, Savanna walks up to Silver and Dixon having lunch, and tells her how she missed out on a great chance on dating her brother. An angry Silver then learns how Dixon lied to her. Silver leaves Dixon and goes back to Teddy to confess her feelings for him. She reveals that she really likes him, but isn't sure if she can trust him.

Later on, Dixon reveals to Teddy what he did and an angry Teddy punches Dixon. The trust problems are still the case when Silver finally decides to give Teddy a chance. While dating, Silver becomes suspicious of Teddy, and asks for advice from another of her closest friends, Naomi. Silver hires someone to spy on Teddy and finds out Teddy is telling other people how much he cares about Silver and that it's serious. Silver then regrets not trusting Teddy, and reveals to him that she had someone spy on him. Teddy is glad that Silver can trust him, but isn't sure if he can trust her. They later end up growing closer and rekindle their trust for each other. The two have fallen completely in love at this point, but Teddy's father, Spence, is reluctant about Teddy having a relationship, saying it will distract him from his tennis. Spence goes as far as to bribe Silver with money to break up with Teddy. Silver declines but breaks up with Teddy anyway, saying she cares about him too much and doesn't want him to stop doing something he loves because of her. In the season finale, Silver allows Teddy to make the decision on whether or not they should stay together. The two later get back together.

=== Season 3 ===
Trevor Donovan became a regular in season 3, and Teddy's storyline became a larger focus of the series.

During the season premiere, an earthquake rocks Beverly Hills, which causes a heavy bookcase to fall on one of Teddy's legs while trying to take cover. Teddy seems to be okay at first, but while at tennis practice he receives a sharp pain in his leg and is transported to the hospital where he later learns he can't play tennis anymore. Angry and frustrated Teddy shows up at Naomi's party and mistreats Silver. An angry Silver walks away, as Teddy gets drunk. He later walks in on a drunken Naomi giving a striptease to two other guys and forces them out to prevent Naomi from making a dumb decision. Naomi is then attracted by Teddy's antics and approaches him in a seductive way as Silver walks in on them. Silver then leaves in tears as Teddy fails to stop her due to his injured leg. The next day, the reconcile but soon get into another fight after Silver finds Teddy drunk and lies to her about it. This brings Silver memories of her and her mother dealing with her alcoholism. Silver then leaves Teddy to do what he wants. The next morning, Teddy wakes up nude in a bed and begins vomiting. He then finds a note from someone telling him how much they enjoyed the hook up. Teddy later finds out he slept with a male student from West Bev named Ian. Teddy confronts Ian, and he assures Teddy that he has nothing to worry about and that he won't tell anyone they hooked up. This only agitates Teddy who then calls Ian a "faggot", when Ian comments on Teddy's bad dance moves during Silver's breast cancer benefit. Ian storms off followed by an angry Silver. On the night of the benefit, he attempts to apologize to Silver, who in return tells him that it's over between them. The next day, Teddy runs into Ian, and orders him to stay away from him. Ian tells Teddy that he doesn't want to be around him either and that just because he can't accept himself, he shouldn't be taking it out on him. This then causes Teddy to attack Ian and a fight emerges between the two. The fight is then broken up by Mr. Matthews and both are given detention for failing to explain the reason for the fight.

During detention, the principal informs Teddy and Ian that the school is short on janitors. So she offers them manual labor which will shorten their detention. The two then agree. While cleaning the gutters, Ian tells Teddy it'll be easier if they work from the roof. They then walk up to the roof and begin to clean. While on the roof, part of the edge breaks off, which causes Ian to almost fall off only to be saved by Teddy. The two reconcile and Teddy apologizes to Ian for everything. Ian forgives Teddy due to him knowing what he's going through. Ian tells Teddy he will be there for him if he ever needs to talk, but Teddy informs Ian there is nothing to talk about. Teddy soon realizes he could be gay when he is about to have sex with a female student. She questions Teddy on why he isn't erect, and Teddy makes an excuse and storms off. As time progresses, Teddy slowly begins to accept his sexuality when he visits a gay bar alone. Though he forgets his wallet at home, and is left to ask Ian for help. Teddy then begins to trust Ian more and sees him as an inspiration. Teddy reveals to Ian that he has been questioning his sexuality for years, but that he's always been trying to ignore those feelings. And that his first attraction to the same sex was on his roommate, Tripp Wellington, while attending Exeter Prep School. He then reveals he dropped out of Exeter after developing feelings for him. This conversation then brings Teddy and Ian closer as friends due to Ian being the only one Teddy can confide in about his homosexuality. A few nights later during a beach luau, Teddy sees Ian with another guy and becomes jealous. Teddy then goes to speak with Silver, who is upset about her romantic feelings towards Navid while he is with Adrianna. Silver then kisses Teddy, but Teddy tells Silver there is someone else. At the end of the night, Teddy offers to help Ian by putting things away. While in a shed, Teddy pulls Ian in for a kiss which ignites the start of their relationship.

Now that Teddy and Ian are an official couple, Teddy tells Ian he doesn't want anyone to know and that their relationship must remain a secret. Ian tells Teddy that he won't go through this again so he breaks up with him. Later at Adrianna's party, Teddy reveals to Ian that he has learned to accept the fact that he is gay, but that he just isn't ready to come out yet. Teddy confesses his feelings to Ian, and they share a passionate kiss on the staircase, though they are unaware that Dixon had seen them. After Christmas break, Teddy comes back to school only to find a note in his locker demanding $50,000 or they will reveal his secret, as well as pictures of him and Ian kissing. After coming out to Silver and gaining support, Teddy finally gains enough of courage to come out to the rest of his friends. Although some are slightly uncomfortable by the news, they still accept him. Going back to Teddy's house, Ian tells Teddy how proud of him he is after all the struggles including the blackmail. Teddy quickly notices he never told Ian anything about the note in his locker, and realizes it was Ian all along. Teddy then breaks up with Ian and tells him to never speak to him again, saying he isn't the person he thought he was. Now that Ian's gone, Teddy is faced to go through the coming out process by himself. He faces some measures of hostility, but has support from Silver. Silver then takes Teddy up to the roof to hit some tennis balls to distract him from his troubles, just how Teddy used to do with Silver while dealing with her mother's cancer. Though, Teddy ends up hitting someone when he hears a scream from the ground. Teddy goes down to apologize and meets a guy named Marco, who is a soccer player at Malibu Country Day. Marco compliments Teddy's serve, and tells him someone must have gotten him really angry to hit a ball that hard. Teddy accidentally outs himself to Marco by saying "Yea, he did". Marco tells Teddy that he's been there, revealing to both Teddy and Silver that Marco could possibly be gay as well. Marco then writes his phone number on the tennis ball he hit him with, so Teddy could call him and give him a few tennis lessons. Silver then talks to Liam, Navid and Dixon to take Teddy to a gay bar as a sign of support after feeling distant from the guys in the group. As soon as they get there, right away both Teddy and Liam feel extremely uncomfortable and awkward. Liam and Teddy soon leave the bar as Dixon and Navid are left to enjoy themselves. Then following a heart-to-heart with Liam, both feel much better. Before spring break, Teddy runs into Marco and invites him over for the night. Teddy reveals to Marco his father is away and that they have the place to themselves. A disappointed Marco tells Teddy he isn't just looking for a hook up and walks away. While vacationing in Mexico, Teddy runs into Tripp, his roommate when he was attending Exeter. Teddy is glad to run into Tripp, but he admits to Silver he wasn't looking forward to a night of acting straight. Tripp then invites Teddy for beers later in the night and Teddy agrees. Teddy also admits to Silver that he was the first guy he ever had feelings for. That night over beers the two are talking, most notably about Teddy's reputation as a player. Teddy then reveals to Tripp that he is gay. As Teddy begins to explain he is cut off by a kiss from Tripp, revealing he's gay as well. Teddy kisses Tripp again and the two hook up back in Teddy's hotel room. The next day at the pool, Teddy meets Will, who is Tripp's boyfriend, with whom he shares an open relationship. Tripp then tells Teddy that guys like them aren't the relationship type. Disappointed in seeing how Tripp was still a player, Teddy admits to Silver he isn't looking for just a hook up anymore. Once Teddy returns to Beverly Hills, he decides to call Marco.

Teddy and Marco soon start dating and Teddy even takes Marco to Ivy and Raj's wedding. However, their relationship soon ends later that summer.

=== Season 4 ===
In the season premiere, Teddy reveals he had split up with his boyfriend; Marco Salazar over the summer for unknown reasons. He decides to spend his final days of summer with Silver, Naomi, Annie, Navid and Dixon. As college begins for most of the group, Teddy decides to take his outing to the next level by coming out to his father. Teddy leaves Beverly Hills for Barcelona, and leaves a voicemail for his father revealing he is gay. He quickly hangs up the phone as the plane descends. Weeks later, Teddy returns to Beverly Hills. He tells Silver that his father never returned his call, nor the several after that. However, his aunt and uncle are revealed to be more accepting of Teddy than his father. Teddy also mentions of having a fling with another man while in Barcelona. Their relationship is then cut short after they both have to return home. While attending CU, Teddy bumps into the same man from Barcelona, whose name is later revealed to be Shane (Ryan Rottman). Shane reveals he is working for a congressional candidate; Marissa (Brandy Norwood), who happens to be running against Teddy's uncle in the election. Shane rules out Teddy's uncle as a homophobe, and tells him they can never be together if Teddy supports his uncle in the campaign. However, Teddy tells Shane he will not stop supporting his uncle, because he is the only one in his family who accepted him. Shane and Teddy later reconcile and decide to join Naomi and the rest of the gang on a trip to Las Vegas. While in Vegas, Teddy realizes how different his life has become and how he will never meet society's expectations, making him depressed. After a night of drinking, Silver manages to convince Teddy to marry Shane. Teddy agrees and the two are married, however there is no official marriage license. Silver also manages to capture their entire wedding on video and accidentally sends it to her candidate; Marissa Harris-Young who then releases the tape to the media in order to cause troubles for her opponent in the election. He has since moved to Washington with Shane. Months later Teddy returns to Beverly Hills and is in awe after hearing about everything that's happened since he left. Silver then tells Teddy about her cancer gene, and that she is seeking a sperm donor to get pregnant and lower her chances at getting cervical cancer. She asks Teddy to be the father of her baby, an honored Teddy gladly accepts.

=== Season 5 ===
In the season premiere, Teddy agrees to be a sperm donor for Silver in the wake of Dixon's horrible car accident, which he and his friends are also dealing with. In a later episode, Teddy's boyfriend, Shane, finds out the agreement Teddy made with Silver and is extremely upset that Teddy didn't talk it out with him. In the mid-season finale, Silver meets Teddy for lunch with the intentions of getting his signature that will ultimately take away all of his parental rights to the child. Teddy, hoping to pleasantly surprise Silver, refuses to sign the papers and reveals that he and Shane would like to help her parent the child. Silver is incredibly unhappy with this gesture because it was not the original plan. Later on, Silver tries to talk things out with Teddy but he still wants to help parent the child with Shane. After that, Shane reveals to Silver that he and Teddy will be taking legal action if she does not let Teddy co-parent the baby.

== Development ==
The character of Teddy was first introduced in the second season of the show. He was originally supposed to stay as a recurring love interest for Silver, but was later upgraded to series regular for the upcoming third season. Upon first arriving to the show, Donovan revealed "Teddy is a new kid at West Beverly High. He’s been on the East coast at a private school and whatnot. He’s the quintessential all American golden boy. He’s the son of a two-time-Oscar-winning actor. Obviously, he comes from a very rich family but isn’t pretentious at all. He doesn’t have that potential rich kid attitude. He’s very nice, very welcoming. He’s more mature beyond his years because he grew up in an adult environment, grew up around the entertainment industry with his father being an actor and all of that. So he comes into school and there’s a little tension and a little drama created by his presence on the scene. So we’ll see." in an interview. Donovan also revealed he was intimidated by the rest of the cast after they've been working on the show together for over a year, but later said everyone was welcoming."

For the third season, Teddy had been upgraded to a series regular. Where he would have a brand new storyline that would involve Teddy coming out as gay. Donovan exclaimed that he didn't want this story "to be this in-your-face moment for a quick ratings boost." As the 31-year-old actor began to talk to the writers, he began to understand the arc of his character Teddy. "It's true to real life, it's happening at a pace I think it would actually happen and it's going to unfold very realistically, [and be] very heartfelt," he says. Donovan tells TVGuide.com that he expects more outbursts as the tennis jock struggles with understanding who he is. "Everything is so internal. He's battling with himself," Donovan says. "He's creating his own problems and ... there's going to be a lot of external struggles from other people mostly caused by his frustration, his anger, his denial and confusion."

With Teddy's storyline coinciding with the recent focus on bullying and teen suicide, Donovan joined other celebrities in Dan Savage's "It Gets Better" project with his PSA. "It's not like teen suicide or bullying is a new problem, but it has come to the forefront and it's been nationally publicized and ... it's been an amazing opportunity to educate people," he says. "There's more layers [this season]," he says."On a show that can tend to be superficial we really dug down into more substance and more crucial issues."

Donovan also revealed that he was honored and flattered that the writers thought he could take such a story and handle it in the way it was written.

== Reception ==
In the beginning, when Teddy was first introduced, his character met with negative reviews from both critics and fans. They felt as if Teddy had no personality and that there really was no reason for him to be on the show. However, this changed dramatically once the third season had begun airing. As people began to see the sensitive and caring side of Teddy as the character grew extremely popular and was well liked by both critics and fans. Many fans praised the writers for choosing Teddy as the character to come out as gay.
