= Sister of the Bride =

Novel by Beverly Cleary

- First edition
- Author: Beverly Cleary
- Language: English
- Publication date: 1963
- Publication place: United States

Sister of the Bride is a 1963 young adult novel by American author Beverly Cleary.

== Plot summary ==
The plot revolves around sixteen-year-old Barbara MacLane, a girl in the suburbs of San Francisco grappling with disappointing romantic prospects, her worries about not being accepted into the University of California, Berkeley, and the fact that she will never catch up to her sister, Rosemary, who is two years older (and a student at Berkeley).

Barbara's feeling of being left in the dust by her sister only intensifies when Rosemary calls home and suddenly announces that she will marry her college sweetheart, Greg. Although this news comes as an unexpected and less-than-pleasant shock to their parents, Barbara becomes enthralled with the romantic details of the wedding, and promptly decides that if she is to be caught up to Rosemary in two years, she needs to step up her search for a boyfriend. Her two potential prospects are Tootie Bodger (Robin to his folks), a tall and rather gloomy trombone player who is more fond of Barbara than she is of him, and Bill Cunningham, a handsome classmate with a Vespa whom Barbara woos with homemade cookies (this somewhat misfires, as he comes to think of her as the "domestic" type and tries to get her to mend a shirt he ripped). Tootie is presented as plodding yet thoughtful, while Bill is conversely dashing but thoughtless.

However, as the stresses of Rosemary's wedding begin to pile up (tension between the lower-middle-class MacLanes and Greg's wealthy parents; the cost of the wedding and the short time frame granted to plan it in; and the sacrifices Rosemary and Greg must make (such as becoming landlords of a dumpy tenement to save on rent), Barbara begins to think that maybe she's not ready to live the life of a serious adult just yet.

At Rosemary's wedding, the sisters' elderly grandmother offers Barbara a bit of advice: "Have a good time while you are young," which Barbara apparently means to follow, focusing less on finding a special sweetheart and more on enjoying socializing with a variety of company and friends.
