= Ryan Rottman =

American actor (born 1984)

- Born: March 17, 1984 (age 42)
- Education: Lufkin High School; Texas Tech University
- Occupation: Actor
- Years active: 2007–present

Ryan Rottman (born March 17, 1984) is an American actor.

He is known for his role as Joey Colvin on the TeenNick series Gigantic.

== Education ==
Rottman graduated from Lufkin High School in Lufkin, Texas, and later attended Texas Tech University.

== Career ==
Rottman started his career in 2008 as an extra in the comedy film The House Bunny. Before that he starred in plays at Texas Tech University.

In 2009, he appeared in films Stuntmen and The Open Road. Rottman's other television credits include Greek, Victorious, 90210, and the web series Valley Peaks.

Rottman played Jordan Lyle in the second season of the ABC Family series The Lying Game in 2013.

== Filmography ==
Film
Year	Title	Role	Notes
2008	The House Bunny	Calendar Buyer	
2009	Stuntmen	Guy Torre	
2009	The Open Road	Peabody Bellhop	
2010	Closing Time	Tyler	Short film
2011	Birds of a Feather	Actor #3	
2011	Cousin Sarah	Jacob Forester	
2014	White Dwarf	Ryan	
2015	Hot Girls	Ray	Short film
2015	Muse	Shady Cop	Short film
2016	This Path	Malcolm	Short film
2016	Guidance	Kevin Ridley	
2017	The Long Walk Home	Scott	Short film
2017	Deported	Business Man #1	
2018	Billionaire Boys Club	Scott	
2019	Sister of the Bride	Ben	
2021	Christmas for Keeps	Ben Tillman	
2022	My Southern Family Christmas	Jackson Shepard	

Television
Year	Title	Role	Notes
2009	Greek	Jess	Episode: "Divine Secrets and the ZBZ Sisterhood"
2010–2011	Gigantic	Joey Colvin	Main cast; 18 episodes
2011	Victorious	Ryder Daniels	Episode: "Beggin' on Your Knees"
2011–2012	90210	Shane	6 episodes
2013	The Lying Game	Jordan Lyle	10 episodes
2013	The Middle	Cliff	Episode: "The Name"
2014	Happyland	Theodore "Theo" Chandler	Main cast; 8 episodes
2015	See Dad Run	Nick Banner	
2016	Diagnosis Delicious	Dave Oberlin	Television film
2018	Christmas Wonderland	Chris Shepherd	Television film
2019	Sister of the Bride	Ben	Television film

Web
Year	Title	Role	Notes
2009	Valley Peaks	DOP 4	Episode: "The Future's Beginning: Part 2"
2009	Valley Peaks	Dr. J. Tupac	Episode: "Valley Peaks: Apocalypse"

Music video roles
Year	Song	Director	Notes
2012	"Maroon 5 Medley"	Kurt Hugo Schneider	Cameo
