= Michael Steger =

American actor (born 1980)

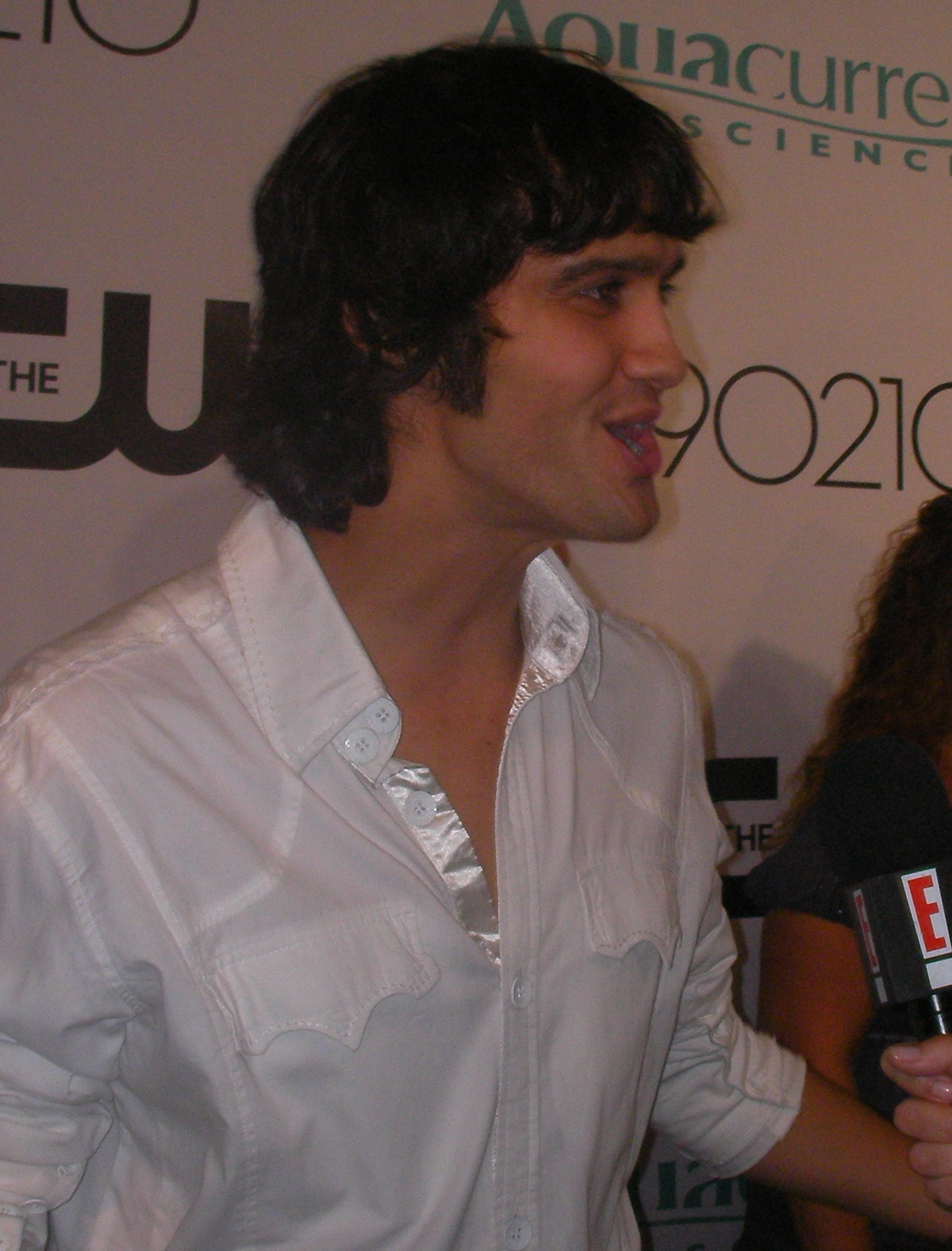
- Steger in August 2008
- Born: Michael Mateus Steger; May 27, 1980 (age 46); Los Angeles, California, U.S.
- Occupation: Actor
- Years active: 1994; 2005–present
- Spouse: Brandee Tucker
- Children: 2

Michael Mateus Steger (born May 27, 1980) is an American actor. He is best known for his role as Navid Shirazi on The CW teen drama series 90210 (2008–2013).

== Early life ==
In an interview, Steger revealed he was bullied during his childhood in the fourth grade until the sixth grade. He was later transferred to another school when the bullying got too serious.

== Career ==
Steger started his career appearing in several commercials and guest starred in VR Troopers in 1994. After appearing as Mohamed Esfiri on NCIS in 2005, he had a recurring role on The Winner in 2007. He was also cast as the lead role by Tim Burton in The Killers' music video "Bones" in 2006.

As of 2007, Steger has appeared in several Disney Channel productions. He has guest starred on the Hannah Montana episode titled "Everybody Was Best-Friend Fighting", the Cory in the House episode titled "Macho Libre", and had a co-starring role in the Disney Channel Original Movie The Cheetah Girls: One World, which was released on August 22, 2008. He also guest starred on Criminal Minds in 2008.

From 2008 to 2013, Steger played the role of Navid Shirazi on The CW's 90210. He directed and produced a one-woman show called Brandee Built on Crazee starring his wife Brandee Tucker.

== Personal life ==
Steger has two children. Michael Steger is married to actress Brandee Steger.

== Filmography ==
=== Film ===
Year	Title	Role	Notes
2005	3 Girls and the Golden Cocoon	Travis	
2007	The Man Under the Tree	Guido	Short film
2007	Meg	Bob	Short film
2013	Farah Goes Bang	Waseem	
2015	Ana Maria in Novela Land	Tony/Armando	
2025	The Ruse	Tom	

=== Television ===
Year	Title	Role	Notes	
1994	VR Troopers	Josh	Episode: "Oh Brother!"	
2005	NCIS	Mohamed Esfiri (uncredited)	Episode: "Kill Ari (Part I)"	
2007	The Winner	Miguel	4 episodes	
2007	Hannah Montana	Guillermo Montoya	Episode: "Everybody Was Best-Friend Fighting"	
2008	Cory in the House	Juan Carlos	Episode: "Macho Libre"	
2008	Criminal Minds	Sam	Episode: "Mayhem"	
2008	The Cheetah Girls: One World	Vikram	Television film	
2008–2013	90210	Navid Shirazi	Main cast	
2010	Covert Affairs	Diego Suarez	Episode: "South Bound Suarez"	
2010	True Blood	Tony	Episode: "I Smell a Rat"	
2013	Blast Vegas	Oren	Television film	
2015	Fatal Flip	Jeff	Television film	
2020	Christmas on the Menu	Stu	Television film	
2023	Grey's Anatomy	Will	Episode: "I'll Follow The Sun"	Television film
2023	The Chosen	Zealot	Episode: "Intensity In Tent City"	

=== Music video ===
Year	Title	Artist	Notes
2006	"Bones"	The Killers	
2013	"Just Another Girl"	The Killers	
