= Trevor Donovan =

American actor

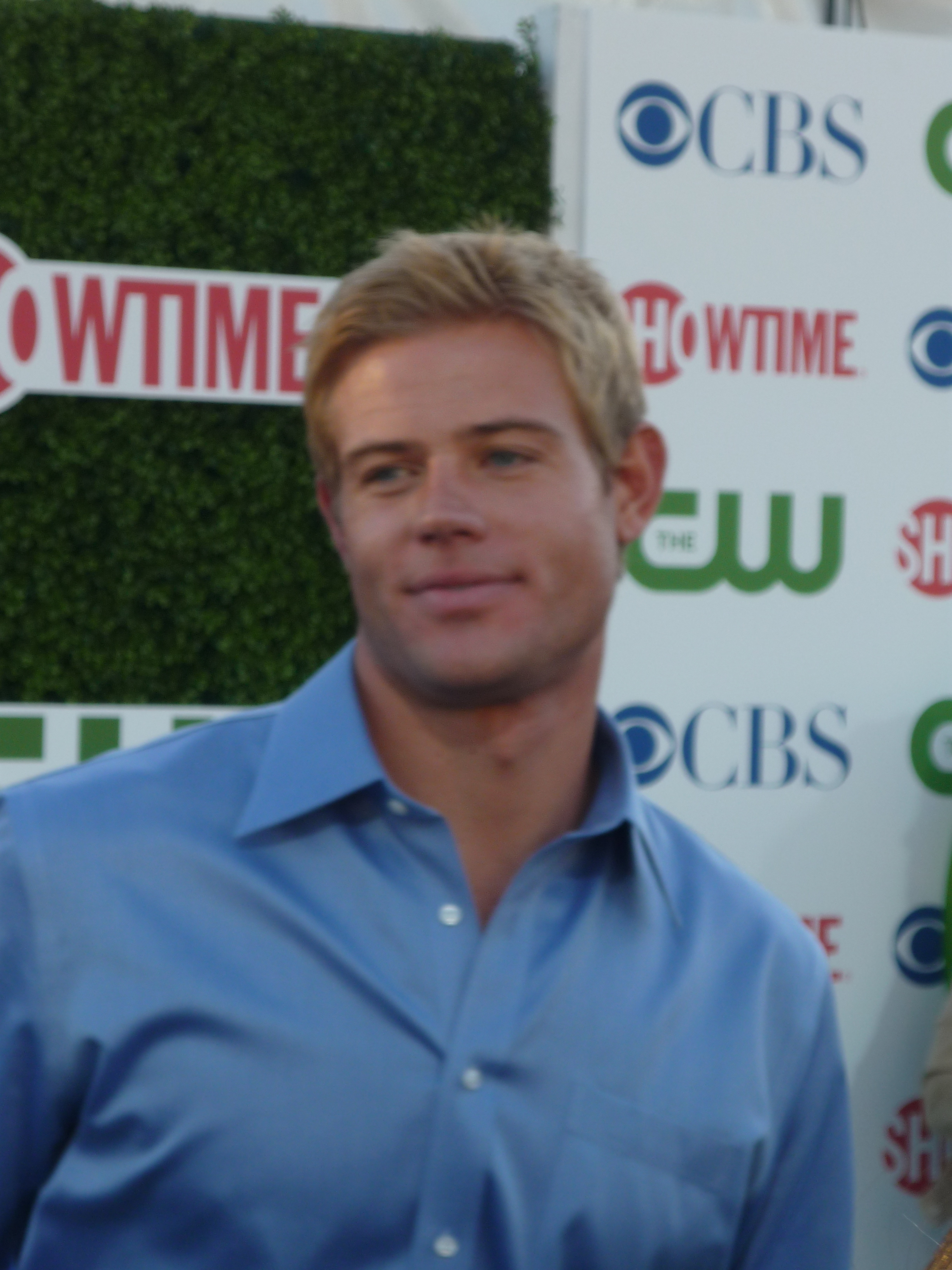
- Donovan in July 2010
- Born: Trevor Donovan Neubauer; October 11, 1978 (age 48) or October 11, 1982 (age 44); Bishop, California, U.S.
- Occupations: Actor; author; model
- Years active: 2004–present

Trevor Donovan Neubauer (born October 11, 1978 or 1982) is an American actor, author, and model. He is best known for his role as Teddy Montgomery on The CW teen drama series 90210 (2009–2013).

== Early life ==
Donovan was born in Bishop, California, and raised in Mammoth Lakes. Sources give his birth year as 1978 or 1982.

== Career ==
Donovan had short stints in 2007 on the NBC daytime soap Days of Our Lives as Jeremy Horton. He had a minor role in the 2009 sci-fi film Surrogates, that of the Surrogate form of Tom Greer (Bruce Willis).

In June 2009, Donovan landed a recurring role on 90210 as Teddy Montgomery, first appearing on September 8, 2009. On May 20, 2010, The CW announced that he was upgraded to series regular. It was later reported that his character would come out as gay in the third season, which premiered on September 13, 2010.

In July 2011, it was reported that Donovan had been signed for a role in Oliver Stone's film Savages, released in July 2012. He had originally screen-tested for a character who was edited out, but after seeing Donovan's screen-test video recording, Stone wrote a part for him that was not in the original book. After 90210 ended, Donovan landed a recurring role in the third season of Melissa & Joey, a situation comedy that starred Melissa Joan Hart and Joey Lawrence as the title characters.

On September 8, 2022, Donovan was announced as a contestant on season 31 of Dancing with the Stars. He was partnered with Emma Slater, and finished sixth.

== Filmography ==
=== Film ===
Year	Title	Role	Notes
2009	Surrogates	The Surrogate of Thomas Greer	
2010	Takers	John Rahway's body double	
2011	Birds of a Feather	Trevor	
2012	Savages	Matt	
2018	The Ghost Beyond	John Burrows	
2020	Wolf Hound	Major Eric Roth	
2020	Hot Water	Jarid Harper	
2024	Reagan	John Barletta	

=== Television ===
Year	Title	Role	Notes
2004	Quintuplets	Waiter	Episode: "Date Night"
2007	Days of Our Lives	Jeremy Horton	Role held: June 1 – October 17, 2007
2009–2013	90210	Teddy Montgomery	79 episodes
2011	CSI: Crime Scene Investigation	Spartan	Episode: "Man Up"
2012	Strawberry Summer	Jason Keith	Hallmark Channel TV movie (also known as Easy Heart)
2013	The Client List	Dashiell Codd	Episodes: "My Main Trial Is Yet to Come" and "Whatever It Takes"
2013–2014	Melissa & Joey	Austin	6 episodes
2013	Drop Dead Diva	Keith	Episode: "50 Shades of Grayson"
2013	A Snow Globe Christmas	Eric	TV movie
2014	Awkward	Stevie Shay	Episode: "My Personal Statement"
2014	Bermuda Tentacles	Trip Oliver	TV movie
2015	Love Finds You in Charm	Noah Weaver	TV movie
2015	Texas Rising	Kit Acklin	Main role, miniseries
2016	Love on a Limb	Kyle Sorenson	Hallmark Channel TV movie
2016	J.L. Family Ranch	Brady Landsburg	Hallmark Movies & Mysteries TV movie
2017	Sun Records	Eddy Arnold	Main role
2017	Escaping Dad	Wes	TV movie
2017	NCIS	Cmd. Thomas Buchner	Episode: "Skeleton Crew"
2017	Marry Me at Christmas	Johnny Blake	Hallmark Channel TV movie
2018	Runaway Romance	Hunter Banning	TV movie
2018	Lucifer	Max Evans	Episode: "High School Poppycock"
2018	The Neighbourhood Nightmare	Stephen Lane	TV movie
2019	Snowcoming	Jake Gillete	Hallmark Channel TV movie
2019	Love, Fall & Order	Patrick Harris	Hallmark Channel TV movie
2019	Prescription for Love	Dr. Luke Taylor	Hallmark Channel TV movie
2019	Nostalgic Christmas	Keith McClain	Hallmark Channel TV movie
2019	The Baxters	Ryan Taylor	7 episodes
2020	USS Christmas	Lt. Billy Jenkins	Hallmark Channel TV movie
2020	J.L. Family Ranch: The Wedding Gift	Brady Landsberg	Hallmark Movies & Mysteries TV movie
2021	Two for the win	Justin O'Neill	Hallmark Channel TV movie
2021	Nantucket Noel	Andy Bittlesman	Hallmark Channel TV movie
2021	Love, Lost & Found	Colt McCoy	Hallmark Channel TV movie
2021	Jingle Bell Princess	Sam Cutler	GAC Family
2022	Aloha with Love	Ben	TV movie
2022	The Engagement Plot	Will Preston	TV movie
2022	Good Morning America	Himself	Guest
2022	Dancing with the Stars	Himself	Contestant (Season 31)
2023	A Harvest Homecoming	Drew Clark	GAC Family
2023	Twas the Text Before Christmas	James	TV movie
2025	Grey's Anatomy	Beau Caraway	S21 Ep15: "Bust Your Windows"
2025	When Hope Calls	Jim Reynolds	
