= Wesen Nacht =

- Grimm episode
- Episode no.: Season 5 Episode 6
- Directed by: Darnell Martin
- Written by: Jim Kouf; David Greenwalt
- Cinematography by: Ross Berryman; Eliot Rockett
- Editing by: Scott Boyd
- Production code: 506
- Original air date: December 11, 2015
- Running time: 42 minutes

Guest appearances
- Jacqueline Toboni as Theresa "Trubel" Rubel; Damien Puckler as Martin Meisner; Madeline Brewer as Billie Trump; Robert Clendenin as Xavier Arivaca; Gabriel Salvador as Dallas Cruz; Danny Bruno as Bud Wurstner; Anne Leighton as Rachel Wood

Episode chronology
← Previous "The Rat King"	Next → "Eve of Destruction"
- Grimm season 5

"Wesen Nacht" is the sixth episode and midseason finale of season 5 of the supernatural drama television series Grimm and the 94th episode overall, which premiered on December 11, 2015, on the cable network NBC. The episode was written by series creators David Greenwalt and Jim Kouf and was directed by Darnell Martin. In the episode, Trubel gives Nick information about the organization she has been attending and serving. Nick, Hank and Wu are also investigating a vandalism, murder and kidnapping. Meanwhile, Nick discovers someone he thought was dead may still be alive.

The episode received positive reviews from critics, who praised Juliette's return.

== Plot ==
Opening quote: "Awake, arise, or be forever fall'n."

Many members of the Wesen Uprising gather together and are given instructions for their next task by Dallas Cruz. Dallas says, "Remember, midnight. Not before. Only these addresses." He hands various members pieces of paper with the addresses and most of the members head out in cars.

Trubel (Jacqueline Toboni) tells Nick (David Giuntoli) about Hadrian's Wall, the resistance group Agent Chavez worked with and that she now works for. They are fighting an underground war against Black Claw, the organization coordinating the global Wesen uprising. Nick, Hank (Russell Hornsby) and Wu (Reggie Lee) are called to investigate a case of vandalism, murder, and kidnapping. At the scene, they find another claw mark drawn on the wall. They suspect the victims are Wesen, which Monroe (Silas Weir Mitchell), Rosalee (Bree Turner) and Bud (Danny Bruno) confirm.

Monroe explains that many historical revolts were instigated by Wesen. The kidnapped victim, Xavier (Robert Clendenin) — a friend of Monroe and Rosalee — returns, claiming he escaped, and points them to a woman, Billie (Madeline Brewer). Nick and Hank come clean to Renard about Chavez's death and her last message: "They're coming to Portland, it's war." After Nick, acting as a Grimm, threatens Billie, she leads Nick, Hank, Renard (Sasha Roiz), and Monroe to the gang's location.

Rosalee drives Xavier home and he confesses to her that he lied; Billie is leading them into an ambush. Rosalee warns Monroe, but it's too late and they get cornered into a room. Suddenly, the members start screaming and the gang hears thudding all around. Renard asks what's going on and Nick says he is going out. Wu says it could be a trap to get them to open the door. Nick goes out and looks around, and he sees members of the Uprising all over the ground. Nick turns around just as Dallas Cruz comes up from behind, and he backhands Dallas across the face. The two briefly grapple, but Dallas gains the advantage and headbutts Nick and throws him to the ground. Dallas picks up a pipe, steps on Nick's chest, and is just about to attack Nick, when he is telekinetically lifted high into the air. Dallas is dropped to the ground as the others come out of the room.... someone who bears an uncanny resemblance to Juliette (Bitsie Tulloch), in a blonde wig. She then quickly leaves.. Meanwhile, Renard publicly endorses Andrew Dixon for mayor.

== Reception ==
=== Viewers ===
The episode was viewed by 3.64 million people, earning a 0.9/3 in the 18-49 rating demographics on the Nielson ratings scale, ranking third on its timeslot and tenth for the night in the 18-49 demographics, behind Dateline NBC, 20/20, The Amazing Race, Hawaii Five-0, Dr. Ken, Blue Bloods, MasterChef Junior, Last Man Standing, and Shark Tank. This was a 2% decrease in viewership from the previous episode, which was watched by 3.69 million viewers with a 0.8/3. This means that 0.9 percent of all households with televisions watched the episode, while 3 percent of all households watching television at that time watched it. With DVR factoring in, the episode was watched by 6.34 million viewers and had a 1.8 ratings share in the 18-49 demographics.

=== Critical reviews ===
"Wesen Nacht" received positive reviews. Les Chappell from The A.V. Club gave the episode a "B+" rating and wrote, "Grimm isn't a show that you normally think of when you think of big dramatic twists. There have been plenty of cliffhangers deployed over four seasons, and plenty of things that were surprising as they've occurred, but it's not a show that relies on huge narrative twists to keep going in the way that shows like Scandal or Empire do on a weekly basis. By contrast, Grimm is an almost leisurely paced show, one that lays the groundwork for its reveals so what happens feels like the natural order of things. If anything, its problem is that it lays too much groundwork for too many things, to the point that events get subsumed by the weight of plot or mythology and the payoff gets muted."

Kathleen Wiedel from TV Fanatic, gave a 4.8 star rating out of 5, stating: "Um, yeah, so, that happened. I confess, I did not see that one coming. And by 'that one' I mean the sudden apparent resurrection of Juliette. Wow. Grimm Season 5 Episode 6 was quite a strong entry, especially as a lead-in to the winter break. It featured the first public signs of the Occultatem Libera Wesen uprising with a night of vandalism targeting Wesen shops, with one storekeep murdered and another kidnapped. The great thing was that the Case of the Week actually directly dealt with the long-term story arc, so there was no feeling of disconnect, as happened with Grimm Season 5 Episode 5."

Liz Prugh from EW wrote, "What exactly is going on, here? We totally called it in the season's premiere that Juliette may have been resurrected and locked in one of Meisner's dungeon-cells. Recall when Meisner was speaking with Chavez, saying that they had to 'play with fire' — what exactly did they do to her?"

MaryAnn Sleasman from TV.com, wrote, "Can we keep up this pattern of not sucking when you return in 2016, Grimm? I would love it so much because I missed this. I missed watching an episode and not wondering where my life went so wrong for its duration. I missed Monroesalie being perfect. I missed Nick being relatively stable for a guy with secret folklore superpowers. I even missed Trubel. And can we talk about this awesome, badass, capable and confident Trubel that the super secret Grimm + Wesen government taskforce has molded for us during her time globetrotting around doing Grimm stuff? Everything is beautiful and nothing hurts, you guys."

Christine Horton of Den of Geek wrote, "Maybe we should all ask Santa for the show to keep to this path upon its return in January? (And maybe a little stocking filler of Meisner?) Grimm is at its best when it gathers its fantastic ensemble cast together in big, action-filled storylines that peel away a little more of the curtain between the human world and Wesen. Let’s hope for more in 2016."
