= Eve of Destruction (Grimm) =

- Grimm episode
- Episode no.: Season 5 Episode 7
- Directed by: John Behring
- Written by: Thomas Ian Griffith
- Cinematography by: Ross Berryman
- Editing by: Chris Willingham
- Production code: 507
- Original air date: January 29, 2016
- Running time: 42 minutes

Guest appearances
- Jacqueline Toboni as Theresa "Trubel" Rubel; Bailey Chase as Lucien Petrovitch; Madeline Brewer as Billie Trump; Damien Puckler as Martin Meisner; Robert Clendenin as Xavier Arivaca; Gabriel Salvador as Dallas Cruz

Episode chronology
← Previous "Wesen Nacht"	Next → "A Reptile Dysfunction"
- Grimm season 5

"Eve of Destruction" is the seventh episode and midseason premiere of season 5 of the supernatural drama television series Grimm and the 95th episode overall, which premiered on January 29, 2016, on the cable network NBC. The episode was written by Thomas Ian Griffith and was directed by John Behring. In the episode, Nick demands to know about Juliette's return and seeks Trubel and Meisner's help in it while also going after the previous case that involves Monroe and Rosalee.

The episode received positive reviews from critics, who praised the writing and the tone.

== Plot ==
Opening quote: "I have been bent and broken, but, I hope, into a better shape."

The group goes outside of the warehouse and Nick (David Giuntoli) runs off to find Trubel (Jacqueline Toboni) to explain Juliette's (Bitsie Tulloch) appearance. Monroe (Silas Weir Mitchell) is called by Rosalee (Bree Turner) to discuss the problem with Xavier (Robert Clendenin).

Nick confronts Trubel for answers. She reveals Chavez knew that Juliette was a Hexenbiest and wanted to turn her into a weapon. But Trubel adds she wasn't sure if Juliette survived what Hadrian's Wall had in store for her. Feeling guilty, Trubel meets with Meisner (Damien Puckler) in secret and gets him to agree to let Nick meet Juliette, at a time and place of his choosing. Meanwhile, Monroe, Rosalee, Renard (Sasha Roiz) and Hank interrogate Xavier, who reveals the Wesen gang had its sights set on Nick and Monroe. Xavier adds that any Wesen who doesn't join them in their mission will be killed.

Hank (Russell Hornsby) and Renard bring Xavier to the precinct and throw him into a cell until he can be placed in protective custody. Their plan is foiled when Lucien Petrovitch (Bailey Chase), Black Claw's leader, sends a hitman to kill Xavier. The assassin poses as a drunk and gets thrown in a jail cell alongside Xavier. He woges and kills Xavier in plain sight. A cop witnesses the woge and shoots him dead before Nick, Hank, Wu (Reggie Lee) and Renard can intervene.

Monroe and Rosalee alert the Wesen Council, and Alexander informs them that an organization called Schwarzkralle (Black Claw) is behind the uprising, but that he cannot discuss it any further. Soon after, a Wesen Council member reveals himself to be part of Black Claw and guns down the majority of the Council during a meeting. Alexander, the only member to get away, calls Rosalee and breaks the troubling news. Nick finally comes face-to-face with Juliette at a restaurant, where she introduces herself as Eve. She dodges most of Nick's questions, but does admit to remembering everything.

Suddenly, she gets up, woges and kills a man telekinetically. The target's bodyguards quickly pull their guns, forcing Nick to get involved and put them down. By the time the cops arrive, Nick has handled the situation — and Juliette/Eve is gone. Meisner phones Nick and explains the meeting was a setup: Hadrian's Wall needed Nick's help to take out an important Black Claw organizer. The meeting was a test and Nick passed.

== Reception ==
=== Viewers ===
The episode was viewed by 3.81 million people, earning a 0.8/3 in the 18-49 rating demographics on the Nielson ratings scale, ranking third on its timeslot and tenth for the night in the 18-49 demographics, behind 20/20, a rerun of Hawaii Five-0, a rerun of Blue Bloods, Dr. Ken, Last Man Standing, MasterChef Junior, Undercover Boss, Dateline NBC, and Shark Tank. This was a 4% increase in viewership from the previous episode, which was watched by 3.64 million viewers with a 0.9/3. This means that 0.8 percent of all households with televisions watched the episode, while 3 percent of all households watching television at that time watched it. With DVR factoring in, the episode was watched by 6.04 million viewers and had a 1.6 ratings share in the 18-49 demographics.

=== Critical reviews ===
"Eve of Destruction" received positive reviews. Les Chappell from The A.V. Club gave the episode a "B+" rating and wrote, "You can say this for Grimm: despite the fact that it's a show getting long in the tooth (or fang, tusk, or lamprey maw as it were) it's not a show that wants to settle down. Between its largely procedural format and the fact that it airs on Friday nights when not many people are watching television, it'd be easy for it to keep to the monster of the week format and only pay off its mythology in bits and pieces. But no, Grimm has exhibited a clear willingness to go beyond that, cutting a bloody swath through various parts of its cast and setting important landmarks ablaze in the service of drama."

Kathleen Wiedel from TV Fanatic, gave a 4.0 star rating out of 5, stating: "Juliette is dead. Long live Eve. The Hexenbiest that was once Nick Burkhardt's girlfriend has been hammered into a nearly emotionless killing machine by Hadrian's Wall to combat Black Claw. And that was just one of the wacky fun things that happened in Grimm Season 5 Episode 7."

Lindi Smith from EW wrote, "Grimm is back, and it's wasting no time delving into all things Eve (Juliette 2.0). With the Black Claw wesen uprising making major moves to take over, the scooby gang grapples with just how deep the uprising's influence runs. Spoiler alert: It's worse than they thought."

MaryAnn Sleasman from TV.com, wrote, "'Eve of Destruction' was the strong start that Grimm needed after the shakiness of Season 5's unsteady opener. The threat that Black Claw represented was global and terrifying. Their ruthlessness rivaled the Royals, but their extremism gave them an edge in that they were perfectly willing to die for their cause. This wasn't just a job for the members of Black Claw, and that all-encompassing influence on their lives meant that this wasn't a group that could be negotiated with. The ISIS/Black Claw parallels were so overt they kinda hurt and the shocking murder of the entire Wesen Council by one of their own upped the intensity and urgency that the beginning of the season was missing. Grimm has long used its fantasy world as a means of holding a mirror up to the real world and 'Eve of Destruction' had moments that felt like a happy return to the complex stories that made Seasons 3 and 4 so freaking good."

Christine Horton of Den of Geek wrote, "This uprising storyline has great potential. It's darker and just... bigger than anything we've seen to date. Done right, it could deliver some massive thrills to Grimm's loyal fans."
