= Maiden Quest =

- Grimm episode
- Episode no.: Season 5 Episode 4
- Directed by: Hanelle Culpepper
- Written by: Brenna Kouf
- Cinematography by: Eliot Rockett
- Editing by: Chris Willingham
- Production code: 504
- Original air date: November 20, 2015
- Running time: 42 minutes

Guest appearances
- Richard Portnow as Daniel Troyer; Robert Baker as Frankie Adkins; Madeline Zima as Emily Troyer; Jacqueline Toboni as Theresa "Trubel" Rubel

Episode chronology
← Previous "Lost Boys"	Next → "The Rat King"
- Grimm season 5

"Maiden Quest" is the fourth episode of season 5 of the supernatural drama television series Grimm and the 92nd episode overall, which premiered on November 20, 2015, on the cable network NBC. The episode was written by Brenna Kouf and was directed by Hanelle Culpepper. In the episode, Nick and Hank investigate an assassination attempt on a nightclub owner but they find that this attempt is involved in a trial for a maiden's hand. Meanwhile, Renard is asked to support the campaign of an old friend for mayor.

The episode received positive reviews from critics, who praised the plot and ending.

== Plot ==
Opening quote: "After three days and nights, whoever tries and does not succeed shall be put to death."

Adalind (Claire Coffee) struggles to get Kelly to stop crying. Nick (David Giuntoli) suggests that Kelly has colic, but neither he nor Adalind know how to tell if he has colic, so they decide to call Rosalee. Adalind says Kelly won't stop crying and asks how they tell if it's colic. Rosalee tells her it's colic pretty much if he won't stop crying. Kelly suddenly stops crying and Nick and Adalind realize he is looking at the lights on the phone, so Adalind hangs up.

While investigating an assassination attempt against nightclub owner Frankie Adkins (Robert Baker), who was saved by a mysterious Wesen, Nick and Hank (Russell Hornsby) stumble onto the archaic Wesen tradition of Maagd Zoektocht, where a Weten Ogen (a lynx-like Wesen) pits three suitors against each other for the hand of a maiden. In this case, Daniel Troyer (Richard Portnow) is making them fight for his daughter Emily's (Madeline Zima) hand, and their first trial is to kill Frankie, whose henchmen had killed Troyer's son.

After a second unsuccessful attempt on Frankie's life, the first suitor's mother points Frankie to Troyer. Frankie tries to kill Troyer, who's saved by the mysterious Wesen, Emily herself. Troyer explains to his daughter that the test was for her to prove she was worthy of succeeding him. Captain Renard (Sasha Roiz) is asked to support an old friend, Andrew Dixon (Michael Sheets), who's running for Mayor.

In the closing scene, Nick arrives home and holds Kelly. Adalind tells Nick that he looks more tired than Kelly does. Adalind tells Nick she was worried about him with everything that's happening. Nick hugs her, much to Adalind's surprise, as they hear a crash outside, causing Kelly to start crying. Nick goes outside to investigate and sees a crashed motorcycle. He then hears gasping behind him and turns around to see an injured Trubel (Jacqueline Toboni), assumed to be dead, stumbling towards him. She weakly says Nick's name and falls forward, but Nick catches her.

== Reception ==
=== Viewers ===
The episode was viewed by 3.62 million people, earning a 0.9/3 in the 18-49 rating demographics on the Nielson ratings scale, ranking third on its timeslot and tenth for the night in the 18-49 demographics, behind The Amazing Race, MasterChef Junior, Hawaii Five-0, Blue Bloods, Dateline NBC, Dr. Ken, Last Man Standing, 20/20, and Shark Tank. This was a 2% decrease in viewership from the previous episode, which was watched by 3.66 million viewers with a 0.9/3. This means that 0.9 percent of all households with televisions watched the episode, while 3 percent of all households watching television at that time watched it. With DVR factoring in, the episode was watched by 6.21 million viewers and had a 1.7 ratings share in the 18-49 demographics.

=== Critical reviews ===
"Maiden Quest" received generally positive reviews. Les Chappell from The A.V. Club gave the episode a "B−" rating and wrote, "It's a course of action that's produced good episodes in the past, but 'Maiden Quest' doesn't manage to rise to those levels. Instead, it's a middling episode of Grimm that manages to deliver a serviceable weekly case, but it's without the almost mythological component that's made prior cases in the same vein so engaging. And surrounding it are only a few narrative bread crumbs, promising some interesting story lines down the road but failing to introduce enough to make it interesting in the here and now."

Kathleen Wiedel from TV Fanatic, gave a 4.3 star rating out of 5, stating: "After last week's extremely lackluster episode, I was pleasantly surprised by how much I enjoyed this week's installment. 'Maiden Quest' featured the classic tale of vying for the hand of the fair maiden, turned right on its head in some pretty entertaining ways. Grimm Season 5 Episode 4 featured not noble knights hunting a dragon but three guys attempting to win the daughter of a Wesen mob boss. And the man they were trying to kill to complete the quest, he was just an ordinary human. So in this version, the monster hunted the man!"

Liz Prugh from EW wrote, "The show is still hinting at Rosalee's motherly instinct. She also received a mysterious letter from someone in her past in Seattle letting her know that 'Carlos' has died. What shadow from her past is coming back, and will it affect her relationship with Monroe?"

MaryAnn Sleasman from TV.com, wrote, "My darlings! Grimm has opted to gift us one of those Wesen-have-really-crappy-traditions episodes that we love so much before taking a breather for a week so we can all recover from our turkey comas. This week, prepper-Nick emerged from his doomsday bunker to keep tabs on a mobster family with a curious courtship practice because there's definitely nothing gross or upsetting about using a person as a prize in a contest of wits, daring, and thievery."

Christine Horton of Den of Geek wrote, "This tried-and-test formula can be an interesting hook, if handled well. But this week's plot involving mobsters, revenge and trials for a fair maiden's hand was just a little underwhelming on all fronts. The two-bit gangster at the heart of the story was a walking cliché (anyone else expecting him to tell one of his goons to 'fuhgeddaboudit'?), the identity of the killer was obvious from the opening minutes, the revenge angle turned out to be tenuous, and, frankly, we weren't seeing anything new about which to get excited."
