= The Grimm Identity =

- Grimm episode
- Episode no.: Season 5 Episode 1
- Directed by: Eric Laneuville
- Written by: Jim Kouf; David Greenwalt
- Cinematography by: Ross Berryman
- Editing by: Chris Willingham
- Production code: 501
- Original air date: October 30, 2015
- Running time: 42 minutes

Guest appearances
- Elizabeth Rodriguez as Katrina Chavez; Jacqueline Toboni as Theresa "Trubel" Rubel; Damien Puckler as Martin Meisner; Danny Bruno as Bud Wurstner

Episode chronology
← Previous "Cry Havoc"	Next → "Clear and Wesen Danger"
- Grimm season 5

"The Grimm Identity" is the first episode and season premiere of season 5 of the supernatural drama television series Grimm and the 89th episode overall, which premiered on October 30, 2015, on the cable network NBC. The episode was written by series creators David Greenwalt and Jim Kouf and was directed by Eric Laneuville. In the episode, Nick is hell bent on finding Trubel after she is kidnapped and goes after Agent Chavez, deducing she may be responsible. Meanwhile, Adalind starts going into labor while Nick and the group discover a new threat is arriving at Portland.

The episode brought the show's lowest numbers but received positive reviews from critics, who praised its dark tone.

== Plot ==
Opening quote: "It is not light that we need, but fire."

Nick (David Giuntoli) mourns over Juliette's (Bitsie Tulloch) body when suddenly, assailants enter the house, kidnap Trubel (Jacqueline Toboni) and drug Nick. The drug causes Nick to hallucinate Juliette's funeral and finding his mother's head in his house before he wakes up. When he wakes up, he finds that Trubel, Juliette and his mother's head are gone and the house was cleaned. He receives a call from Hank (Russell Hornsby), informing him of the situation and going over the house.

Monroe (Silas Weir Mitchell) and Rosalee (Bree Turner) are informed of Juliette's death. Nick recalls when Chavez (Elizabeth Rodriguez) kidnapped Trubel and deduces that she may be responsible and goes to her office to confront her. He threatens her but she denies her involvement in the events and has him taken away from the office. She is later seen in an unknown location where she meets with Meisner (Damien Puckler) to discuss an inmate. Nick is later confronted by Renard (Sasha Roiz), who chastises him for his recklessness. Hank and Wu (Reggie Lee) discover that three people died in the house across the street from Nick's house.

Bud (Danny Bruno) is giving breakfast to Adalind (Claire Coffee), when she suddenly starts to go into labor, and he takes her to the hospital. Nick eventually discovers Chavez's address, fights her in the apartment and knocks her out. He takes Chavez to the spice shop and handcuffs her in the basement. They question her with Nick revealing himself as the Grimm when Bud calls to announce Adalind is giving birth. Nick and Rosalee go to the hospital, when the baby's heart rate drops and the doctors are forced to do a C-section on Adalind.

Back in the spice shop, Chavez is let to answer her phone to announce that Nick is the Grimm and they need to meet. She calls Nick, who agrees to go with her and frees her.

Nick and Chavez arrive at a warehouse to meet with her agents but instead, they find them dead. Suddenly, two Wesen arrive and attack them. Chavez kills one of them but the other stabs her with his claws in the stomach. Nick goes after the Wesen but it escapes, leaving a symbol of a claw in the wall. He tries to calm Chavez but Chavez is bleeding out. She explains, "they're rising" and gives him Trubel's chess piece and her phone before dying. Nick talks with Meisner on the phone, who tells him to keep it. Nick goes back to the hospital where he meets Adalind and the baby. She says that the baby is for both of them and decide to name him Kelly.

== Reception ==
=== Viewers ===
The episode was viewed by 4.04 million people, earning a 1.1/4 in the 18-49 rating demographics on the Nielson ratings scale, ranking third on its timeslot and ninth for the night in the 18-49 demographics, behind Hawaii Five-0, Blue Bloods, Dr. Ken, The Amazing Race, Last Man Standing, Shark Tank, 20/20, and the third game of the 2015 World Series. This was a 15% decrease in viewership from the previous episode, which was watched by 4.74 million viewers with a 1.1/4 and it's also a massive 24% decrease from the previous season premiere, which was watched by 5.28 million viewers with a 1.4/5 in the 18-49 demographics. This means that 1.1 percent of all households with televisions watched the episode, while 4 percent of all households watching television at that time watched it. With DVR factoring in, the episode was watched by 6.36 million viewers and had a 1.9 ratings share in the 18-49 demographics.

=== Critical reviews ===
"The Grimm Identity" received positive reviews. Les Chappell from The A.V. Club gave the episode a "B+" rating and wrote, "On that front, Grimm is off to a good start for season five. Last season Grimm embarked on one of its most ambitious narrative arcs ever by pushing Juliette down the dark path of evil Hexenbiest, and it doubled down on that direction in the season finale when Trubel shot her dead and she died in Nick's arms. This was a huge development for Grimm — the first main character killed off in its run — and the season premiere doesn't shy away from the ramifications of that death. It also wisely uses that death as the springboard for the rest of the season, with the implication things aren't going to get better anytime soon and a status quo feeling is a long way away."

Kathleen Wiedel from TV Fanatic, gave a 4.0-star rating out of 5, stating: "Hail, and welcome back, fellow Grimmsters! I'm pleased and excited to be writing the reviews of Grimm again this season. Grimm Season 4 suffered from what many (myself included) felt were missed opportunities, especially with Juliette's plot line. Can Grimm Season 5 do better?"

Liz Prugh from EW wrote, "We pick up right where we left off in last season's finale, with a desperate Nick holding his beautiful, monstrous ex-love's dead body in his arms. Trubel is standing above the sad scene, knowing that she had no other choice. Juliette would have killed Nick, and would Nick really have tried to stop her by killing her? Would he do what was necessary?"

MaryAnn Sleasman from TV.com, wrote, "Grimm has always struck me as an uneven series in terms of pace and quality. There are so few mediocre episodes, in my opinion. I either love an episode or find myself rethinking my Friday night priorities. That's both the blessing and the curse of serialized television. It's also a disappointment when your high hopes are dashed. After the high Grimm ended it's [sic] fourth season on, I was SO. FREAKING. READY for Season 5. Maybe I was too ready. Maybe I needed to dial it back a bit. 'The Grimm Identity' wasn't what I was hoping for or even expecting, but it's just the first episode in a long, long season. Grimm built itself a strong foundation over the years and one unfortunate episode is nothing to panic about."

Christine Horton of Den of Geek wrote, "And so begins another season of fun and games for our favourite folklore-inspired series."
