= Map of the Seven Knights =

- Grimm episode
- Episode no.: Season 5 Episode 10
- Directed by: Aaron Lipstadt
- Written by: Jim Kouf
- Cinematography by: Eliot Rockett
- Editing by: Chris B. Willingham
- Production code: 510
- Original air date: February 19, 2016
- Running time: 42 minutes

Guest appearances
- Jacqueline Toboni as Theresa "Trubel" Rubel; Damien Puckler as Martin Meisner; Rick Overton as Felix Dietrich; Carsten Norgaard as Krisztian Ajandok; Adam O'Byrne as Oscar Vasicek; Anne Leighton as Rachel Wood

Episode chronology
← Previous "Star-Crossed"	Next → "Key Move"
- Grimm season 5

"Map of the Seven Knights" is the tenth episode of season 5 of the supernatural drama television series Grimm and the 98th episode overall, which premiered on February 19, 2016, on the cable network NBC. The episode was written by series co-creator Jim Kouf and was directed by Aaron Lipstadt. In the episode, Monroe's uncle Felix is targeted by Black Claw agents for information about Grimms and he flees to Portland to sell Grimm books to Nick before is too late.

The episode received positive reviews from critics, who praised the return of the keys to the main storyline and the direction the show is taking.

== Plot ==
Opening quote: "History is the nightmare from which I am trying to awake."

In Leipzig, Monroe's uncle Felix Dietrich (Rick Overton) is asked by Andrea Stroh to appraise books from the estate of Joseph Nebojsa. Two Anubis Wesen from Black Claw kill Andrea, and Felix flees to Portland with one of the books – written by and for Grimms – to show Nick (David Giuntoli), asking $100,000 for the collection. Nick is desperate to replace the books lost when Juliette (Bitsie Tulloch) burnt his Aunt Marie's trailer, but doesn't have the money. The two Anubis Wesen arrive in Portland and kill Felix in his hotel room, where Nick and Monroe (Silas Weir Mitchell) find a shipping slip which they follow to the killers; in a fit of rage, Monroe tears out their throats. Nick and Monroe find Felix's trunk and take it to the spice shop. In addition to detailed catalogs of Wesen, the books contain Grimm family trees, including Nick's ancestry. Monroe finds a secret compartment and, using his watchmaker skills, unlocks it. It contains three keys, and using these with the two keys Nick already had, they stamp together the five pieces of the Map of the Seven Knights, ancestors of the Grimm. It leads to a spot in the Schwarzwald (The Black Forest, Germany).

== Reception ==
=== Viewers ===
The episode was viewed by 4.04 million people, earning a 0.9/3 in the 18-49 rating demographics on the Nielson ratings scale, ranking third on its timeslot and eight for the night in the 18-49 demographics, behind Dr. Ken, The Amazing Race, Hawaii Five-0, Last Man Standing, 20/20, Blue Bloods, and Shark Tank. This was a 4% decrease in viewership from the previous episode, which was watched by 4.19 million viewers with a 0.9/3. This means that 0.9 percent of all households with televisions watched the episode, while 3 percent of all households watching television at that time watched it. With DVR factoring in, the episode was watched by 6.56 million viewers and had a 1.7 ratings share in the 18-49 demographics.

=== Critical reviews ===
"Map of the Seven Knights" received positive reviews. Les Chappell from The A.V. Club gave the episode an "A−" rating and wrote, "Now, with 'Map Of The Seven Knights,' the keys are back on the scene, another plot added to Grimm's china cabinet of spinning plates. As if the clash of a populist monster conspiracy and a shadowy government agency weren't enough to drive the season, now there's the location of a treasure that could be anything up to and including the Ark of the Covenant. Yet despite everything else that’s going on, there's something about this introduction that feels like a jolt instead of a burden, the playing field suddenly expanded in the right way."

Kathleen Wiedel from TV Fanatic, gave a 4.5 star rating out of 5, stating: "Alas, poor Felix. We hardly knew you! At least he got to be in arguably one of the strongest episodes of the season thus far – Grimm Season 5 Episode 10 was straightforward and tightly-written, and the Case of the Week (RIP Felix!) served the long-term arc. In this case, very long term: the Seven Keys were introduced all the way back in the pilot episode!"

Lindi Smith from EW wrote, "Grimm serves up another amazing episode with 'Map of the Seven Knights.' The show choosing to have one overarching story that connects each episode this season is really paying off. Every episode so far in season 5 has been incredibly engaging and memorable."

MaryAnn Sleasman from TV.com, wrote, "Since its return from winter hiatus, Grimm has steadily redeemed itself for the sins of the early episodes of this season; returning to some of the show's dropped storylines and oldest mythology does well to connect the series' two dissonant tones. Just because the secret government mutant black-ops MIB terminator factory part of the universe is hilarious and awful doesn't mean it can't still be entertaining. If Grimm can maintain the balance between the stuff we actually care about and the stuff that makes us die inside, as shown in this week's episode, the series might (MIGHT) just return to being the Friday night highlight in my book. No promises though."

Christine Horton of Den of Geek wrote, "Yes it looks like the Grimm gang is finally off on a European adventure after they discover a series of mysterious links back to the old country. Well, the links are actually the long-forgotten keys from season one, now that the writers seem to have remembered they exist. They were part of an important thread at the time, so we should be grateful that the story is being picked up again, even if it's all still quite fuzzy at the moment. Essentially, they're a set of keys that produce a map to a place where something – no-one knows what – is buried. But let's assume whatever it is, is really important."
