= A Reptile Dysfunction =

- Grimm episode
- Episode no.: Season 5 Episode 8
- Directed by: David Straiton
- Written by: Michael Golamco
- Cinematography by: Eliot Rockett
- Editing by: George Pilkinton
- Production code: 508
- Original air date: February 5, 2016
- Running time: 42 minutes

Guest appearances
- Jacqueline Toboni as Theresa "Trubel" Rubel; Damien Puckler as Martin Meisner; David Figlioli as Logan Cobb; Dean Chekvala as Wayne Dunbar; Lenny Jacobson as Oliver Dunbar; Anne Leighton as Rachel Wood

Episode chronology
← Previous "Eve of Destruction"	Next → "Star-Crossed"
- Grimm season 5

"A Reptile Dysfunction" is the eighth episode of season 5 of the supernatural drama television series Grimm and the 96th episode overall, which premiered on February 5, 2016, on NBC. The episode was written by Michael Golamco and was directed by David Straiton. In the episode, Nick meets Meisner and Trubel for information about Hadrian's Wall and the purpose of the organization while also investigating a murder in a lake, which is rumored to be the place for a monster living in the lake.

The episode reached season highs and received positive reviews from critics, who praised the character development of the episode.

== Plot ==
Opening quote: "A sucker is born every minute."

Nick (David Giuntoli) tells Wu (Reggie Lee), Hank (Russell Hornsby), and Renard (Sasha Roiz) that the incident at the restaurant was a test. He also tells them about Meisner (Damien Puckler), who works with Eve (Bitsie Tulloch) and Trubel (Jacqueline Toboni), and also worked with Agent Chavez. Meisner and Renard know each other through the Resistance. Meisner is now part of Hadrian's Wall.

Nick and Hank investigate the death of tourists at Diamond Lake, home of the Diamond Lake Monster. The local bait shop is owned by the Dunbar brothers, Oliver (Lenny Jacobson) and Wayne (Dean Chekvala), who are "Luisant-Pecheur" (otter-like Wesen). Meisner, with Trubel's help, tries to recruit Nick to Hadrian's Wall. At the Portland Command Center of Hadrian's Wall, Nick sees a map that shows Black Claw-affiliated Wesen uprisings around the world. The command center is funded by a branch of the Federal Government.

Back at Diamond Lake, Sheriff Parcell (Greg Michaels) tells Nick and Hank that the story about the lake monster is a myth like the Loch Ness Monster or Ogopogo. With Trubel's help, Nick and Hank look for the Diamond Lake Monster, who they suspect is a "Wasser Zahne". The Wasser Zahne turns out to be Logan Cobb (David Figlioli) a man who has been working with the Dunbar brothers in keeping the myth of the lake monster alive for a share of the profits. They then trick Logan and the two brothers into hiring Trubel into killing Logan before Nick and Hank burst in revealing Trubel to be a Grimm. Nick and Hank arrest one brother while the other escapes into the lake while woged before being shot multiple times by worried villagers and killed.

== Reception ==
=== Viewers ===
The episode was viewed by 4.59 million people, earning a 0.9/3 in the 18-49 rating demographics on the Nielson ratings scale, ranking third on its timeslot and tenth for the night in the 18-49 demographics, behind Dr. Ken, Dateline NBC, Super Bowl’s Greatest Halftime Shows, 20/20, Last Man Standing, Undercover Boss, and Shark Tank. This was a 16% increase in viewership from the previous episode, which was watched by 3.81 million viewers with a 0.8/3. This means that 0.9 percent of all households with televisions watched the episode, while 3 percent of all households watching television at that time watched it. With DVR factoring in, the episode was watched by 6.80 million viewers and had a 1.7 ratings share in the 18-49 demographics.

=== Critical reviews ===
"A Reptile Dysfunction" received positive reviews. Les Chappell from The A.V. Club gave the episode a "B+" rating and wrote, "While that argument can easily be made for both Nick's team and the show as a whole, the first Wesen of the week episode of 2016 forms an effective counterpoint. 'A Reptile Dysfunction' is an example of the format executed well enough that it justifies the format's continued existence, proving the value of a breath of fresh air—or a gulp of fresh water, such as it is—to a season-long story. Grimm benefits from getting out from its end times dogma, reminding the team and the viewers that even though there's one big threat out there it doesn't have to be the only threat they deal with."

Kathleen Wiedel from TV Fanatic, gave a 3.8 star rating out of 5, stating: "Not a lot happened on the Black Claw front, other than Nick's tour of HW's secret base, leaving the bulk of the episode over to the Wasser Zähne and the two Luisant-Pêcheur brothers. So, if you enjoy Case of the Week episodes, this was probably a nice one for you."

Lindi Smith from EW wrote, "Before we dig into this week's episode of Grimm, can we just take a second to appreciate the title of this episode? You know the writers had a good laugh over that one. Good job, writers."

MaryAnn Sleasman from TV.com, wrote, "I'm not going to say that Grimm has jumped the shark with this latest expansion of WTF world-building, but I'm definitely laughing and I can't stop and I'm not taking this show seriously anymore. I can't. Serious Grimm had a good run, but the transformation into quirky comic book theatrics and silliness is complete. And that's okay. There's a place for rubber masks, iffy CGI, and loads and loads of cheese. Batcrap craziness has always been Grimm's bread and butter, even when the series decided to try on the 'grown-up' pants and dabble in deep and meaningful symbolism and real-world parallels. Grimm still seems to think of itself as some kind of fantastical mirror to the real world and I guess in a way it still is. Sometimes I don't know what the hell is happening in real life, just like I haven't been able to make heads or tails or fangs or claws of what's going on in Grimm's Portland this season."

Christine Horton of Den of Geek wrote, "So while more information about Black Claw's monstrous activities comes to light, the show clutches onto the comfort blanket that is a Wesen-of-the-Week story, which while mildly entertaining, served as little more than a distraction from the darker and much more interesting events that are unfolding from the Wesen Uprising."
