= The Beginning of the End (Grimm) =

- Grimm episodes
- Episode nos.: Season 5 Episodes 21/22
- Directed by: David Greenwalt (Part I); Norberto Barba (Part II)
- Written by: Jim Kouf &; David Greenwalt (Part I); Thomas Ian Griffith (Part II)
- Cinematography by: Ross Berryman (Part I); Eliot Rockett (Part II)
- Editing by: Scott Boyd (Part I); Chris Willingham (Part II)
- Production code: 521/522
- Original air date: May 20, 2016
- Running time: 84 minutes

Guest appearances
- Part I: Jacqueline Toboni as Theresa "Trubel" Rubel; Shaun Toub as Conrad Bonaparte; Damien Puckler as Martin Meisner; Anne Leighton as Rachel Wood; Part II: Jacqueline Toboni as Theresa "Trubel" Rubel; Shaun Toub as Conrad Bonaparte; Anne Leighton as Rachel Wood; Robert Blanche as Sgt. Franco

Episode chronology
← Previous "Bad Night"	Next → "Fugitive"
- Grimm season 5

"The Beginning of the End" is the 21st and 22nd episodes and two-part season finale of season 5 of the supernatural drama television series Grimm and the 109th and 110th episodes overall, which premiered on May 20, 2016, on the cable network NBC. Part I was written by series creators David Greenwalt and Jim Kouf and was directed by Greenwalt, in his Grimm directional debut. Part II was written by Thomas Ian Griffith and directed by executive producer Norberto Barba. The finale was originally going to be just an episode, titled "The Beginning of the End" while the first part was titled "Set Up". However, on April 30, 2016, NBC announced that the two episodes would be merged to broadcast a two-hour season finale. In the episode, Black Claw prepares to make its move now that Renard was named the mayor of Portland. Hank is arrested when two bodies appear in his house, part of the strategy taken by Black Claw. Meanwhile, Nick, Meisner and Trubel continue looking for any information regarding Conrad Bonaparte so they can stop the threat that will pose Portland forever.

The season finale received enormous praise from critics, who praised the fast pace and execution of the episode, naming it among the series' best episodes.

== Plot ==
=== Part I ===
Opening quote: "It is better to die on your feet than to live on your knees."

After Renard's (Sasha Roiz) victory, Nick (David Giuntoli) tells Meisner (Damien Puckler) and Trubel (Jacqueline Toboni) about his offer to join Black Claw. Meisner states that having a Grimm with them can be an advantage but they will kill everyone close to him. Eve (Bitsie Tulloch) announces that Zuri managed to confess the name, "Bonaparte". This instantly reminds Meisner of Conrad Bonaparte, one of the founders of Black Claw. Hank (Russell Hornsby) receives a call from the police to go to his house so he and Nick leave Hadrian's Wall.

In the mansion, Diana (Hannah R. Lloyd) uses her powers to use her dolls to make Adalind (Claire Coffee) and Renard to make out. However, Adalind stops the making out and slaps Renard, causing him to furiously leave the room, being watched by Diana. At Hank's house, Nick and Hank discover that the Black Claw members that Nick killed that night are in the house and the police arrest Hank for the murders when a witness claims to have seen him. Monroe (Silas Weir Mitchell) confronts a group of Black Claw members outside his house and tells Trubel to find their location. Adalind sleeps with Diana that night, who confides in her that she doesn't like Rachel (Anne Leighton) because of her love for Renard.

Hank is taken by two detectives to a cabin where the detectives are revealed to be Wesen and knock him out to tie him. Nick and Wu (Reggie Lee) go to question the witness but find her gone and signs of break-in in her house. Nick goes back to the precinct so the accusation gets nullified but finds Wesen working there that stop him from doing what he wants. Wu then finds that no calls were made from the witness's house. Bonaparte (Shaun Toub) meets with Adalind to discuss her awkwardness with them and to show his power, woges into a Zauberbiest and turns her into stone for a moment. He then gives her a ring, warning her not to take it off, being painful for her children.

Nick and Wu decide to take Monroe to the precinct to question Tony (Joseph Kathrein), Rosalee's (Bree Turner) ex-boyfriend and member of Black Claw. Monroe acts as a furious husband to Tony and he reveals Hank's location. Nick goes with Trubel and Eve to the location to save Hank. They burst in and kill the Wesen restraining him and find the witness dead in the back of the room. Then, they realize that their sources indicated the same address and discover that they have been set up. Meanwhile, Black Claw attacks Hadrian's Wall, killing nearly everyone inside. Meisner enters the main room and finds Renard there. He answers a phone call from Eve, to inform them that it's too late and that he might die. Renard explains that they can spare him but Bonaparte enters and uses his powers to strangle Meisner while bleeding out. Renard then shoots him in the chest to end his suffering.

Nick, Hank, Eve and Trubel return to Hadrian's Wall to find everyone dead. Seeing that now no one can face Black Claw, Nick tells everyone to go to his loft for safety while Trubel cries over Meisner's body. Diana uses her powers that night to strangle Rachel with her sheets and shows Adalind, shocking her. Adalind then wakes up, thinking it was a nightmare. However, Diana is seen with her woged eyes, suggesting that it was no nightmare after all. Nick, Hank and Wu arrive at the precinct where Nick locks himself with Renard in his office. Then, he attacks Renard in his office and they fight until Renard uses his powers to throw Nick through the window and has officers arrest him. Nick is taken to the jail and after a moment, sees the Black Claw symbol carved in the wall.

=== Part II ===
Opening quote: "All the world is a will to power..."

Hank and Wu visit Nick in the cell, who informs them that Renard is responsible for Meisner's death and instructs them to take everyone to his loft for safety. In the bullpen, Renard calls Bonaparte to inform him of Nick's arrest and he asks for a talk with him in the precinct. Bonaparte then prepares the Wesen cops to take Nick out as soon as the process takes place.

Outside Monroe's house, Eve kills the Black Claw agents watching over while Rosalee learns that she is pregnant but decides not to tell anyone yet. Trubel arrives at the house to tell them that they need to go to Nick's loft. In the loft, Eve instructs Monroe and Rosalee to hide any evidence in the spice shop from Black Claw and she, Hank and Wu head to the precinct to stop Nick from being killed by the Wesen. The precinct is bombarded with 911 calls and all the good cops leave the precinct while the Wesen take out Nick. Wu is unable to stop the Wesen from taking Nick but, as a lycanthrope, manages to kill two of them just as Hank arrives.

Nick is placed on the center of the precinct where Bonaparte appears, telling him that he wants the Grimm ancestry book, torturing him with mental hallucination about Kelly. Eve and Trubel arrive and kill many of the Wesen. Eve and Bonaparte fight, ending when Bonaparte uses his powers to hit her with a shard of glass. They take her to the loft where they use the stick to heal her wounds when she begins to experience a seizure, likely because of her Hexenbiest status. After everyone meets in the loft, Diana (through a message sent by Adalind) appears to tell them that Adalind was forced to tell their location to Black Claw. Diana returns to her house where she notices a wound on Adalind's neck, who explains that daddy's "friend" did it to her.

Black Claw agents arrive at the loft and Nick forces everyone to get out through the tunnels while he fights off the incoming Black Claw agents. He is shot multiple times but uses the stick to heal himself while he kills them. Meanwhile, in the tunnels, Monroe finds a blocked opening that prevents them from escaping when Rosalee confesses to being pregnant to him. He is happy to hear the news and they hug. Back in the loft, Renard and Bonaparte arrive and Bonaparte begins choking Nick with his powers when Renard stabs him with a sword. He is in fact getting possessed by Diana, who wanted revenge for her mother's beating. Renard regains the control and he and Nick stare in shock for what happened.

== Reception ==
=== Viewers ===
The episode was viewed by 4.03 million people, earning a 0.9/4 in the 18-49 rating demographics on the Nielson ratings scale. Part I ranked first on its timeslot while Part II ranked second on its timeslot and fourth for the night in the 18-49 demographics, behind Dateline NBC, 20/20, and Shark Tank. This was a massive 18% increase in viewership from the previous episode, which was watched by 3.39 million viewers with a 0.8/3. but it's a 15% decrease from the previous season finale, which was watched by 4.74 million viewers with a 1.1/4 in the 18-49 demographics. This means that 0.9 percent of all households with televisions watched the episode, while 4 percent of all households watching television at that time watched it. With DVR factoring in, the finale was watched by 6.29 million viewers and had a 1.7 ratings share in the 18-49 demographics.

Overall, the fifth season of Grimm averaged 5.97 million viewers, a 15% decrease from the previous season, which was watched by 6.98 million viewers and making it the lowest-rated season of the show.

=== Critical reviews ===
"The Beginning of the End" received enormous praise. Les Chappell from The A.V. Club gave the episode a "A" rating and wrote, "The fifth season finale adds another level of interest in that 'The Beginning Of The End' is the first official two-parter that Grimm's ever done, leaving aside how you choose to classify its season finale/premiere bridge episodes. Yet despite being twice the length of your normal Grimm, it never feels like it’s padded or dragging its feet, and in fact moves at the quickest pace the show's ever set. It's a finale that pays off all the rising tensions of the season and sparks every powder keg that's left to spark: there's beatings, gunfire, boiling of blood vessels, magical feuds, two miraculous resurrections, and a little girl with enough power to offset all of it. Alternatively thrilling and horrifying, it's a worthy cap to an ambitious season, continuing the show's commitment to not be business as usual."

Kathleen Wiedel from TV Fanatic, gave a 4 star rating out of 5, stating: "The finale as a whole was dramatic and fairly fast-paced. The actors for the most part did an excellent job expressing the intensity, tension, and emotion of the situation. I found the finale quite a ride – not perfect, but it was definitely exciting and also impressed me with how far it went to completely overturn the characters' lives."

Lindi Smith from EW wrote, "Before we dive into all of the episode details, can we talk about this stellar season? It was the best yet, which is pretty impressive for a show in their fifth season. 'The Beginning of the End' was honestly one of the best season finales of any show I've ever seen, and definitely the best episode of Grimm to date. What made it so wonderful? It was truly the culmination of everything — the fight scenes, the pace, the plot, the emotion and heart, the unpredictability, the suspense, the writing and the acting. Okay, I'll stop gushing now."

MaryAnn Sleasman from TV.com, wrote, "'The Beginning of the End' was a prophetic choice of a title given the precarious state of Grimm's shortened sixth season. Together, both halves of the breakneck bloodbath served to up the tension of Renard's election victory even higher while also trimming a lot of the extra crap from a series that, underneath all the excess, had good bones and a strong foundation."

Christine Horton of Den of Geek wrote, "The show's two-hour season five finale, however, went above and beyond what we've seen this season. Despite its extended length, the episode crammed an awful lot in, yet remained fast paced, keeping the dramatic tension high at all times."
