= Key Move =

- Grimm episode
- Episode no.: Season 5 Episode 11
- Directed by: Eric Laneuville
- Written by: Thomas Ian Griffith
- Cinematography by: Ross Berryman
- Editing by: George Pilkinton
- Production code: 511
- Original air date: March 4, 2016
- Running time: 42 minutes

Guest appearances
- Jacqueline Toboni as Theresa "Trubel" Rubel; Bailey Chase as Lucien Petrovitch; Damien Puckler as Martin Meisner; Anne Leighton as Rachel Wood; Wolf Muser as Father Eickholt

Episode chronology
| ← Previous "Map of the Seven Knights" | Next → "Into the Schwarzwald" |
- Grimm season 5

"Key Move" is the 11th episode of season 5 of the supernatural drama television series Grimm and the 99th episode overall, which premiered on March 4, 2016, on the cable network NBC. The episode was written by Thomas Ian Griffith and was directed by Eric Laneuville. In the episode, Nick and Monroe set off to Germany in order to find a treasure hidden in a field but local Wesen are closing on them to stop them from finding what they are looking for. Meanwhile, Renard helps Dixon with his campaign but there's an assassination attempt on Dixon that may trigger the elections.

The episode received positive reviews from critics, who praised the new storyline and the set-up for the next episode.

== Plot ==
Opening quote: "It is not down in any map; true places never are."

Nick (David Giuntoli), Hank (Russell Hornsby), Wu (Reggie Lee), Monroe (Silas Weir Mitchell), Rosalee (Bree Turner), and Trubel (Jacqueline Toboni) continue to search for clues in the Map of the Seven Knights. Nick has a flashback of his mother, Kelly, telling him about the legendary seven keys belonging to seven knights, ancestors to all Grimm. The knights fought for seven royal families in the Fourth Crusade. The seven keys together made a map showing where the knights hid the wealth they took from Constantinople when it was sacked and burnt. Nick believes the treasure could be found. Trubel thinks they may have buried it in seven churches. Nick and Monroe travel to Germany on counterfeit passports, using Frederick Calvert (Rosalee's late brother) and Felix Dietrich as aliases, to avoid detection from the Black Claw. They travel to the church locations marked on the map, but find little that is old enough to be a possible location, and local Wesen become suspicious of their questions. Nick and Monroe travel at night to a spot in the forest near the site of the German Peasants' War, where they believe an ancient church may have stood. They discover chisel marks on old stones and end up falling into an old cavern.

== Reception ==
=== Viewers ===
The episode was viewed by 4.26 million people, earning a 1.0/4 in the 18-49 rating demographics on the Nielson ratings scale, ranking second on its timeslot and third for the night in the 18-49 demographics, behind a rerun of Shark Tank, and The Amazing Race. This was a 5% increase in viewership from the previous episode, which was watched by 4.04 million viewers with a 0.9/3. This means that 1.0 percent of all households with televisions watched the episode, while 4 percent of all households watching television at that time watched it. With DVR factoring in, the episode was watched by 6.69 million viewers and had a 1.7 ratings share in the 18-49 demographics.

=== Critical reviews ===
"Key Move" received positive reviews. Les Chappell from The A.V. Club gave the episode an "A−" rating and wrote, "Regardless of how you feel about Grimm having an overabundance of stories to tell, there's no question that when it manages to make one of them pay off, it's typically worth the frustration. 'Map Of The Seven Knights' last week was able to reinvigorate what was at one time the central mystery of the show, and 'Key Move' keeps that momentum going by turning a lackluster plot into a gripping one. One bullet suddenly raises the stakes for everyone, and a shot in the chest turns into a narrative shot in the arm."

Kathleen Wiedel from TV Fanatic, gave a 4 star rating out of 5, stating: "Renard's subplot with the mayoral election finally paid off on Grimm Season 5 Episode 11, with a Black Claw assassin shooting would-be mayor Andrew Dixon as our heroes watched helplessly. It's moments like this that you want to shake them and shout that they are cops, with cop equipment, including radios! They are not, after all, the only ship in the quadrant! There would definitely have been other cops at the rally!"

Lindi Smith from EW wrote, "What is so important that this group of wesen would want to protect it? It's obviously not something that they can utilize — but rather something they don't want anyone else getting their hands on, especially a grimm. Could it be something used by a grimm to eradicate wesen, or maybe something that could make grimms stronger than ever? What if the missing keys were really important and would have warned Nick about a potential Aladdin situation where touching the forbidden treasure would fill the cave with molten lava? We'll have to wait until next week for the very special 100th episode of Grimm to find out! "

MaryAnn Sleasman from TV.com, wrote, "All griping about Grimm's increasing ridiculousness aside, 'Key Move' was entertaining and fun with just enough serious business plot to avoid becoming the dreaded 'filler.' If you don't think too hard about it and just roll with the cartoon punches, Grimm is still perfectly serviceable Friday night cannon fodder. Unfortunately, thinking too hard is in my job description and I know what Grimm used to be capable of. At least we get to finally find out what the freaking keys are for."

Christine Horton of Den of Geek wrote, "Last summer, the show's executive producers hinted that they had big plans for the show’s 100th episode, coming up next week. 'We're going to explain the damn keys,' Grimm co-creator David Greenwalt told a Comic-Con audience, before adding: 'We' still don't know what they do but by god we're going to explain it.' It looks like Greenwalt is keeping his word as we approach episode 100 with Nick and Monroe up to their necks in the forest – literally – being pursued by a bunch of bad guys with murder on their minds."
