= Clear and Wesen Danger =

- Grimm episode
- Episode no.: Season 5 Episode 2
- Directed by: Norberto Barba
- Written by: Thomas Ian Griffith
- Cinematography by: Ross Berryman; Eliot Rockett
- Editing by: George Pilkinton
- Production code: 502
- Original air date: November 6, 2015
- Running time: 42 minutes

Guest appearances
- Jonathan Slavin as Paul Wemlinger; Susan Ruttan as Betty Frame; Damien Puckler as Martin Meisner; Robert Blanche as Sgt. Franco

Episode chronology
← Previous "The Grimm Identity"	Next → "Lost Boys"
- Grimm season 5

"Clear and Wesen Danger" is the 2nd episode of season 5 of the supernatural drama television series Grimm and the 90th episode overall, which premiered on November 6, 2015, on NBC. The episode was written by Thomas Ian Griffith and was directed by Norberto Barba. In the episode, Nick, Hank and Wu investigate a person who seemingly embezzled money for the company.

The episode received positive reviews from critics, who praised its fast pace.

== Plot ==
Opening quote: "Cherish those who seek the truth but beware of those who find it."

Beau Childs (Gary Kraus), CEO of a company named C&E, finds that the company has too much money gone and informs clerk Paul Wemlinger (Jonathan Slavin) of the issue. Before Childs can inform the police, Wemlinger woges into a Gila-like Wesen and kills him before calling the police himself to report the incident as a troubled witness.

In the hospital, Nick (David Giuntoli) informs Monroe (Silas Weir Mitchell), Hank (Russell Hornsby), Wu (Reggie Lee) and Rosalee (Bree Turner) of Chavez's death and they go to the warehouse to inspect the area. They arrive at the warehouse but find that the crime scene is cleaned. They leave the area, unaware that Meisner (Damien Puckler) is watching over them. Returning to the hospital, Nick tells Adalind (Claire Coffee) that she and Kelly will have to go to his house while he looks for a safe place for them.

In the precinct, Hank is told by Renard (Sasha Roiz) that he was assigned a new partner, Officer Pogue (Joseph Bertot) while Nick is suspended. They are assigned to investigate Childs' murder. Hank and Pogue interrogate Wemlinger, who claims that two men entered and killed Childs, and that after calling the police, he called Childs' assistant, Betty Frame (Susan Ruttan). While questioning Betty, Wu tells Hank that only Betty and the police were the ones who entered the office at that time and finding that Wemlinger was with Childs, they deduce that he might be a Wesen. Wu then runs a test of prints and finds that Wemlinger's real name is Simon Kincaid and he is wanted for embezzlement.

Hank breaks protocol and brings Nick to the station to see if Wemlinger is a Wesen. During interrogation, Nick sees that he's a Quijada Vil. However, Marshals have arrived and taken Wemlinger in custody back to California. Wemlinger kills the marshals while in a gas station and escapes. Hank and Pogue arrive at the station and Hank sees the claw mark again in the bathroom. Meanwhile, FBI agents question Nick about Chavez's disappearance and signs of a fight in her house. Nick denies his involvement but is warned by the agents.

Nick and Hank interrogate a C&E accountant who reveals that Wemlinger was calling a phone number during the money transfer. After getting the number, Wu tells them that the number belongs to Betty Frame. Nick, Hank and Wu arrive at Betty's house where Wemlinger holds her and escapes through a fire escape. Nick, Hank and Wu go after him and shoot him, killing him. However, they return to the apartment and find Betty deleting evidence. She woges and screams "Occultatum Libera" before jumping out of the window, killing herself.

In the spice shop, Nick, Hank, Wu, Monroe and Rosalee begin to study the mysterious claw mark.

In the unknown location, Meisner gets out of the mysterious cell, badly wounded. When the guard asks how it went, he replies "Better."

== Reception ==
=== Viewers ===
The episode was viewed by 3.78 million people, earning a 1.0/4 in the 18–49 rating demographics on the Nielson ratings scale, ranking third on its timeslot and tenth for the night in the 18–49 demographics, behind Dateline NBC, The Amazing Race, Hawaii Five-0, Dr. Ken, Last Man Standing, MasterChef Junior, Blue Bloods, 20/20, and Shark Tank. This was a 7% decrease in viewership from the previous episode, which was watched by 4.04 million viewers with a 1.1/4. This means that 1.0 percent of all households with televisions watched the episode, while 4 percent of all households watching television at that time watched it. With DVR factoring in, the episode was watched by 6.15 million viewers and had a 1.8 ratings share in the 18–49 demographics.

=== Critical reviews ===
"Clear and Wesen Danger" received positive reviews. Les Chappell from The A.V. Club gave the episode a "B" rating and wrote, "After a series of episodes that have escalated the danger and stepped back from procedural activity, Grimm is back to a more familiar groove this week with 'Clear And Wesen Danger.' Once again, there's a monster of the week who needs to be tracked down and it seems like the overarching plot is being conducted off to the side, except this time Grimm's trying to build more of a synergy between its two sides. That's a balance that the show hasn't often struck — when its weekly cases are tied to Resistance/Royal/Wesenrein/etc. activity it's usually more obvious that the episode is an outlier — and while it's a little rocky in its transition, there's compelling enough action and development that thing still seem to be going in the right trajectory."

Kathleen Wiedel from TV Fanatic, gave a 4.0 star rating out of 5, stating: "It was typically gruesome fare when the Wemlinger ripped out the throat of the unfortunate accountant, even as I saw it coming a mile away. It was also pretty obvious that sweet old lady Betty would turn out to be Wesen, too. The case ended with another ominous reminder of the coming war."

Liz Prugh from EW wrote, "This week's Grimm continues to hint at the rising of a war, introducing new monsters as well as theories about what the four slashes mean. We also see Nick, Adalind, and Kelly settling into their home as a family. Nick seems genuine about wanting to give this baby a good life, and he isn't adding to his laundry list of crap to deal with—the death of Juliette, not knowing where Trubel is, the 'raging war' that's coming, and his baby momma moving in — by thinking about whether he's a Grimm, a Hexenbeist, or what Adalind calls a 'Grimmerbeist/Hexengrimm.'"

MaryAnn Sleasman from TV.com, wrote, "That was better, right? This episode felt like a return to Grimm's strengths and while far from perfect, 'Clear and Wesen Danger' was certainly channeling the good stuff in its efforts to return Nick and the gang to some kind of stability. The discomfort that permeated 'The Grimm Identity' was still present, as it should be. Nick's life hasn't been so dramatically altered since his Grimm legacy was revealed and the saddest part is that in the end, Aunt Marie's warnings about the dangers of trying to have family and normalcy in their life were proven right. Nick, Juliette, and their occasionally warring Wesen allies made such positive progress over the course of the previous four seasons. It was really starting to look like the dark ages of the Royal oppression and the threat of constant Grimm vs. Wesen violence were starting to give way to a brave new world—one where there was a place for all of these different groups to peacefully, or at least tolerably, coexist."

Christine Horton of Den of Geek wrote, "This is a good thing. If the writers take their time and develop a major storyline that runs all season – and allow Nick and the others to focus solely on it – it would not only be a real change to previous seasons with their 'Wesen of the week' plots, but it would add a story arc that, hopefully will provide more detail about the shadowy second world that we still don’t understand."
