= Silence of the Slams =

- Grimm episode
- Episode no.: Season 5 Episode 13
- Directed by: David Straiton
- Written by: Brenna Kouf
- Cinematography by: Ross Berryman
- Editing by: Chris B. Willingham
- Production code: 513
- Original air date: March 18, 2016
- Running time: 42 minutes

Guest appearances
- Danny Mora as Benito; Joseph Julian Soria as Goyo; Anne Leighton as Rachel Wood; Chavo Guerrero Jr. as James Vazquez; Tim True as Larry; Robert Blanche as Sgt. Franco

Episode chronology
← Previous "Into the Schwarzwald"	Next → "Lycanthropia"
- Grimm season 5

"Silence of the Slams" is the 13th episode of season 5 of the supernatural drama television series Grimm and the 101st episode overall, which premiered on March 18, 2016, on NBC. The episode was written by Brenna Kouf and was directed by David Straiton. In the episode, Nick and Hank investigate the murder of a man which is related to a wrestler who is wearing a mask with special powers.

The episode received mostly positive reviews from critics, who praised the case of the week.

== Plot ==
Opening quote: "Give a man a mask and he will show his true face."

Benito (Danny Mora) is a Wesen called Vibora Dorada (a version of Xipe Totec adapted by Santeria priests) who owns Benito's Masks; some of his masks are endowed with special powers. Goyo (Joseph Julian Soria), an ambitious professional wrestler, asks for a mask to help him win. Benito tries to dissuade Goyo, but Goyo convinces him he can handle it. Benito heads out that night and attacks a Wesen called Balam, biting the victim's neck which paralyzes the Balam so he stays woged. Benito then surgically removes the skin of the Wesen's face to make this special luchador mask. Nick (David Giuntoli) and Hank (Russell Hornsby) investigate when the body is discovered. Benito warns Goyo to only wear the mask in the ring, but Goyo cannot resist the power and wears it in his apartment and on the street. He encounters one of his opponents in an alley and, unable to control himself, kills him.

Nick and Hank visit the scene of the killing and gain leads indicating Goyo and Benito's involvement. Meanwhile, Goyo seeks Benito's help to get the now-unremovable mask off. Nick, Hank, Monroe (Silas Weir Mitchell), and Rosalee (Bree Turner) enter Benito's Masks to find Benito dead and Goyo dying. Rosalee, chanting in Spanish, performs the ceremonia de desgracias (misfortune ceremony).

== Reception ==
=== Viewers ===
The episode was viewed by 4.20 million people, earning a 1.0/4 in the 18-49 rating demographics on the Nielson ratings scale, ranking third on its timeslot and eight for the night in the 18-49 demographics, behind Dateline NBC, Dr. Ken, 20/20, Last Man Standing, Shark Tank, and an NCAA game. This was a 7% increase in viewership from the previous episode, which was watched by 3.91 million viewers with a 0.9/3. This means that 1.0 percent of all households with televisions watched the episode, while 4 percent of all households watching television at that time watched it. With DVR factoring in, the episode was watched by 6.30 million viewers and had a 1.7 ratings share in the 18-49 demographics.

=== Critical reviews ===
"Silence of the Slams" received positive reviews. Les Chappell from The A.V. Club gave the episode a "B" rating and wrote, "Consequently, I've known in the back of my head that we would return to the case-of-the-week format before too long, which we do with 'Silence Of The Slams.' While it's an approach that Grimm's never been terrible with, it's definitely ceased to be my favorite flavor of the show over the years, and the back-to-basics feel of events deflates the appreciable momentum of the last few weeks. Nothing about it is bad, but coming after a string of pretty terrific episodes it's hard for it to avoid letdown."

Kathleen Wiedel from TV Fanatic, gave a 4 star rating out of 5, stating: "It was Case of the Week time in Grimm Season 5 Episode 13, with the team getting sucked into a case with a luchador being controlled by his own magical mask, which had been made from the face of a Balam."

Lindi Smith from EW wrote, "What will Nick think if he finds out about Renard's involvement with Black Claw, and will this be yet another secret that Adalind keeps from him? There could also be trouble in paradise for Monroe and Rosalee since she has yet to tell him about Tony showing up in Portland while he was out of the country. Could all of this lying put the Scooby gang at odds during a time when sticking together is what they need most?"

MaryAnn Sleasman from TV.com, wrote, "'Silence of the Slams' was a throwback Grimm, a methodical case-of-the-week episode with minimal spy games and Black Claw shenanigans, hardly any mention of the death-defying creation twig that Nick and Monroe risked life and limb for last week, or even much political maneuvering on Renard's part. He moped about his dead mayoral candidate and we got some verbal acknowledgement that Renard's brah was a 'good man' who was going to lift Portland out of that pesky hipster muck of craft beer, vegan bath bombs, and ridiculous/delicious donuts. Poor Portland. You'll never see a more wretched hive of scum and villainy — or so the Grimm take on politics seems to imply. Anyway, at the end of the day, we didn't freaking know the guy and he served to give Renard a plot point that has gone on entirely too long. Thank the TV gods that Renard finally decided to grab Adalind and go find their doomsday baby. Anything, to get him away from this tediousness."

Christine Horton of Den of Geek wrote, "After the build-up to Grimm's 100th episode last week, the show's writers apparently felt the need to put a chokehold on some of the heavyweight storylines we've been treated to recently, and instead fall back on a regular Wesen-of-the-Week case. It's a shame the show is pulling its punches at this stage in the season when there's so much going on, least of all a global Wesen uprising and the discovery of an ancient artefact that can heal the sick and dying. But no, let's create an episode centred on the Portland wrestling scene!"
