= Into the Schwarzwald =

- Grimm episode
- Episode no.: Season 5 Episode 12
- Directed by: Norberto Barba
- Written by: David Greenwalt; Jim Kouf
- Cinematography by: Eliot Rockett
- Editing by: Scott Boyd
- Production code: 512
- Original air date: March 11, 2016
- Running time: 42 minutes

Guest appearances
- Damien Puckler as Martin Meisner; Bailey Chase as Lucien Petrovitch; Anne Leighton as Rachel Wood; Wolf Muser as Father Eickholt

Episode chronology
← Previous "Key Move"	Next → "Silence of the Slams"
- Grimm season 5

"Into the Schwarzwald" is the 12th episode of season 5 of the supernatural drama television series Grimm and the 100th episode overall, which premiered on March 11, 2016, on the cable network NBC. The episode was written by series creators David Greenwalt and Jim Kouf and was directed by Norberto Barba. In the episode, Nick and Monroe survive the fall and find that they are in the church they were looking for and start searching the treasure. Meanwhile, chaos emerges in Portland following Dixon's assassination while Renard is given an offer.

The episode received mostly positive reviews from critics, who praised the resolution to the keys storyline.

== Plot ==
Opening quote: "What's past is prologue."

Nick (David Giuntoli) and Monroe (Silas Weir Mitchell) fall into the catacombs of an ancient church in the Schwarzwald in Germany, where they find a small brass chest. As they emerge from the catacombs, they are discovered by the local Wesen and narrowly escape, though Monroe is bitten. Meanwhile, Portland mayoral candidate Andrew Dixon is killed by Marwan, a Black Claw assassin. While visiting the spice shop Adalind (Claire Coffee) is threatened by Rosalee's (Bree Turner) ex, Tony, causing her Hexenbiest powers to return. Tipped by Black Claw to the whereabouts of the Marwan, Renard (Sasha Roiz) tracks him and kills him during a fight. Unbeknownst to Renard, this foils the Hadrian's Wall plan to use the Marwan for information. Later, Renard is confronted with a Black Claw plan to become the new mayoral candidate, and is tempted by this position of power.

Nick and Monroe arrive at the spice shop and open the chest with Rosalee, Hank (Russell Hornsby), and Wu (Reggie Lee) present, finding an old shard of wood wrapped in a cloth. While debating its nature, Monroe begins to get sicker from the now-infected wound on his arm. Still holding the shard, Nick tries to help a stumbling Monroe, and the group is astonished when the wound on Monroe's arm fades; they deduce that the shard has healing powers.

== Production ==
The cast and crew held a party celebration on November 10, 2015 to celebrate the show's 100th episode. Among the attendants were Oregon Governor Kate Brown, Portland City Commissioner Nick Fish, Portland Police Sgt. Peter Simpson and many NBC executives. It was also announced that Mayor of Portland Charlie Hales had declared officially November 10 as the "Grimm day."

== Reception ==
=== Viewers ===
The episode was viewed by 3.91 million people, earning a 0.9/3 in the 18-49 rating demographics on the Nielson ratings scale, ranking third on its timeslot and ninth for the night in the 18-49 demographics, behind Dateline NBC, Dr. Ken, The Amazing Race, 20/20, Last Man Standing, Hawaii Five-0, Blue Bloods, and Shark Tank. This was a 9% decrease in viewership from the previous episode, which was watched by 4.26 million viewers with a 1.0/4. This means that 0.9 percent of all households with televisions watched the episode, while 3 percent of all households watching television at that time watched it. With DVR factoring in, the episode was watched by 6.24 million viewers and had a 1.7 ratings share in the 18-49 demographics.

=== Critical reviews ===
"Into the Schwarzwald" received mostly positive reviews. Les Chappell from The A.V. Club gave the episode an "A" rating and wrote, "A proximity to the pilot also casts the events of Grimm's hundredth episode 'Into The Schwarzwald' in a different light. On its own it would be a noteworthy episode, full of major events and upheavals in the show's world. Yet none of those upheavals feel outside the norm. Everything that happens tonight is connected to things that have been part of this world since the beginning, and that have even greater significance when you look at how far they've come. It's the best kind of milestone episode, one that doesn't get bogged down in its own importance or mythology but one that remembers the story it's already told and the story yet to tell."

Kathleen Wiedel from TV Fanatic, gave a 4.5 star rating out of 5, stating: "Well, now we know. I think. Maybe. Do we? I'm not sure. In Grimm Season 5 Episode 12, Nick and Monroe successfully retrieved the long-hidden Crusader treasure, the culmination of a mystery that was first introduced in the very beginning of the series, Grimm Season 1 Episode 1. But what was it that the seven Grimm knights thought was so important or dangerous or valuable that they hid in a mausoleum in the middle of the Black Forest? Apparently, a stick."

Lindi Smith from EW wrote, "'Into the Schwarzwald' was hands down the best episode this season, which is saying a lot since every episode this season has been solid. From Nick and Monroe dodging danger and finding a less-than-expected treasure, to Adalind's startling discovery, this episode was action-packed."

MaryAnn Sleasman from TV.com, wrote, "Grimm's 100th episode was nothing special—which is a shame, because it was obviously trying to be. We had biblical shit! And assassinations! Extortion! And biological imperatives! And yet... 'Into the Schwarzwald' played out like any other aggressively average episode of the series. Could we have gotten a basket of Easter eggs on this celebratory occasion? Maybe a throwback to Nick's awful floppy hair of the early seasons? No? I would have almost preferred a clip show."

Christine Horton of Den of Geek wrote, "This week Grimm hit its much talked-about 100th episode, and in the main, it didn't disappoint. Show creators Jim Kouf and David Greenwalt had previously teased a big reveal to the four-and-a half-season-long storyline involving those damn keys, but they were still in no hurry to reveal their secrets."
