= Star-Crossed (Grimm) =

- Grimm episode
- Episode no.: Season 5 Episode 9
- Directed by: Carlos Avila
- Written by: Sean Calder
- Cinematography by: Ross Berryman
- Editing by: Scott Boyd
- Production code: 509
- Original air date: February 12, 2016
- Running time: 42 minutes

Guest appearances
- Jacqueline Toboni as Theresa "Trubel" Rubel; Damien Puckler as Martin Meisner; Wade Williams as Mark Holloway; Anne Leighton as Rachel Wood

Episode chronology
← Previous "A Reptile Dysfunction"	Next → "Map of the Seven Knights"
- Grimm season 5

"Star-Crossed" is the ninth episode of season 5 of the supernatural drama television series Grimm and the 97th episode overall, which premiered on February 12, 2016, on the cable network NBC. The episode was written by Sean Calder and was directed by Carlos Avila. In the episode, Nick and Hank go after a Wesen serial killer who kills its victims through a barbarian crucifixion. They decide to use Monroe to go undercover and find the killer.

The episode received positive reviews from critics, who praised the case of the week.

== Plot ==
Opening quote: "Only you shall not eat the blood; you shall pour it out on the earth like water."

Nick (David Giuntoli) and his team hunt for a Wesen serial-killer, a "Fuilcre", who uses an ancient barbarian Wesen water-rune/rain-crucifixion ritual with a symbol of the Golden Dawn. Monroe (Silas Weir Mitchell) goes undercover at a pep rally to help Nick investigate a lead. The rally is actually a recruiting tool for Black Claw. Eve (Bitsie Tulloch) and Trubel (Jacqueline Toboni) interrogate a Black Claw suspect; Eve uses a "See No Evil, Speak No Evil, Hear No Evil" technique. Adalind (Claire Coffee) helps Nick solve his case when she tells him about an Aztec ceremony, Fire Drill, involving Orion's Belt — whenever it rose above the horizon, a man would be sacrificed on top of a pyramid. This information leads to the next ritualistic sacrificial site.

== Reception ==
=== Viewers ===
The episode was viewed by 4.19 million people, earning a 0.9/3 in the 18-49 rating demographics on the Nielson ratings scale, ranking third on its timeslot and eight for the night in the 18-49 demographics, behind Dateline NBC, Be My Valentine, Charlie Brown, The Amazing Race, Hawaii Five-0, Blue Bloods, Shark Tank, and 20/20. This was a 6% decrease in viewership from the previous episode, which was watched by 4.42 million viewers with a 0.9/3. This means that 0.9 percent of all households with televisions watched the episode, while 3 percent of all households watching television at that time watched it. With DVR factoring in, the episode was watched by 6.78 million viewers and had a 1.7 ratings share in the 18-49 demographics.

=== Critical reviews ===
"Star-Crossed" received positive reviews. Les Chappell from The A.V. Club gave the episode a "B+" rating and wrote, "The uneasiness of that status quo is on full display in 'Star-Crossed,' which takes a familiar move out of the show's playbook—barbaric Wesen ritual in modern times — and updates its import by tying it to the season's unrest. The end result is a case of the week that's more interesting than that usual format, helping to spell out on a micro level the changes in the show’s ecosystem. While Black Claw's engaged in many acts of rebellion around the globe, 'Star-Crossed' understands that the group's reach is far more insidious than outright declarations of war, and that its promise of dominance can spark a thousand fires."

Kathleen Wiedel from TV Fanatic, gave a 3.7 star rating out of 5, stating: "Older does not mean better. Someone really should remind Black Claw of this little piece of advice. In Grimm Season 5 Episode 9, one of the Black Claw disciples decided it was a grand idea to ritualistically kill a number of humans in order to end a drought. Nice. While one can't automatically discount the power of the ritual, surely there must have been a less bloody way to call rain?"

Lindi Smith from EW wrote, "The case of the week on 'Star-Crossed' involves bodies being strung up on crosses with glass shards over their eyes around the city in ritualistic fashion. The victims are all homeless men and are all found gored to death with a circle of blood around them on the ground. On each of the crosses is a different ancient rune having to do with the element of water. Coincidentally, the area is experiencing a drought."

MaryAnn Sleasman from TV.com, wrote, "With 'Star-Crossed,' Grimm finally captured some of the depth that it's been seeking but failing to grasp this season. Generational divides and the allure of extremist ideologies fueled Portland's latest Wesen homicide and the threat that Black Claw represented became something more relatable than a vast evil underground dedicated to evildoing. Sure, Grimm took the easy road by essentially making them Nazi Wesen, but hey, everybody loves to hate Nazis. They're the only villain you never have to justify hating. They incorporated skulls and crossbones into their uniforms, for frick's sake! That's laughably evil even for cartoon evildoers, but no one is laughing at 6 million murders, and with all of its insidious propagating to impressionable young Wesen and their angry, disenfranchised elders, Black Claw was methodic in its madness. Sadly enough — just like in the real world—there were ears who wanted in on the crazy they were peddling."

Christine Horton of Den of Geek wrote, "Grimm's fifth season continued its descent into darker territory this week. Alongside a behind-the-scenes glimpse into how Hadrian's Wall operates, a Wesen storyline that fits well into the show's main story arc and a potential jab at modern politics, we were also witness to some previously unseen levels of horror."
