= Grimm season 5 =

Grimm
- Season 5
- DVD cover
- No. of episodes: 22

Release
- Original network: NBC
- Original release: October 30, 2015 – May 20, 2016

Season chronology
- ← Previous; Season 4 Next → Season 6

The fifth season of the NBC American supernatural drama series Grimm was announced on February 5, 2015. It premiered on October 30, 2015 and concluded on May 20, 2016. The season consisted of 22 episodes. The series was created by David Greenwalt, Jim Kouf and Stephen Carpenter, and produced by NBC, GK Productions, Hazy Mills Productions, and Universal Television. It follows a descendant of the Grimm line, Nick Burkhardt, as he deals with being a cop, and trying not to expose his secret as a Grimm.

== Cast and characters ==
=== Main ===
- David Giuntoli as Nick Burkhardt
- Russell Hornsby as Hank Griffin
- Silas Weir Mitchell as Monroe
- Bitsie Tulloch as Juliette Silverton / Eve
- Reggie Lee as Sergeant Drew Wu
- Sasha Roiz as Captain Sean Renard
- Bree Turner as Rosalee Calvert
- Claire Coffee as Adalind Schade

=== Recurring ===
- Damien Puckler as Martin Meisner
- Jacqueline Toboni as Theresa "Trubel" Rubel
- Anne Leighton as Rachel Wood
- Michael Sheets as Andrew Dixon
- M. Ben Newman as Jeremiah Rogers
- Bailey Chase as Lucien Petrovich
- Danny Bruno as Bud Wurstner

=== Guest stars ===
- Madeline Brewer as Billie Trump
- Elizabeth Rodriguez as Special Agent Kathryn Chavez
- Carlson Young as Selina Golias
- Spencer Conway as Alexander
- Madeline Zima as Emily Troyer
- Rick Overton as Felix Deitrich - Monroe's Uncle
- Lucy Paschall as Andrea Stroh
- Patrick Fabian as Dr. Eugene Forbes
- Shaun Toub as Conrad Bonaparte

== Production ==
=== Casting ===
Rodriguez returned as Chavez in the episode "The Grimm Identity", as she revealed on her instagram account. In late August, Carlson Young was cast as Selina Golias, a character forced to hide the survivor of an attack that resulted in her boyfriend's death, resulting in Selina becoming the target of a Wesen "Rat King" who doesn't mind if she becomes collateral damage in a never-ending Wesen feud. In early September, Madeline Brewer was cast as Billie Trump for episodes 6 and 7 of the season. Billie is a Skalengeck described as "a fierce lieutenant in an up-and-coming Wesen street gang who is raising hell in Portland." It was announced in November that Bailey Chase had been cast as Lucien Petrovich, "the leader of a Wesen revolutionary group." The news was broken by Deadline.

=== Filming ===
Like the previous four seasons, the majority of filming takes place in the Portland, Oregon, area. Filming for the season began on July 7, 2015.

== Broadcast ==
After airing the last 9 episodes of the previous season on Fridays at 8 p.m., the show moved back to its normal time slot of Fridays at 9 p.m.

== Episodes ==
| No. overall | No. in season | Title | Directed by | Written by | Original release date | Prod. code | US viewers (millions) |
|---|---|---|---|---|---|---|---|
| 89 | 1 | "The Grimm Identity" | Eric Laneuville | David Greenwalt & Jim Kouf | October 30, 2015 | 501 | 4.04 |
Trubel, Juliette, and the severed head of Nick's mother, Kelly, are hustled out of Nick's house by unknown assailants. Chavez and Nick meet at an arranged time in a vacant warehouse; Chavez's mysterious caller is Meisner, who with the aid of the Resistance helped Adalind escape from the Royals. Nick and Chavez are attacked by a group of Wesen and Chavez is killed. Before she dies, Chavez gives Trubel's dark knight chess piece to Nick. Nick answers Agent Chavez's phone and speaks to Meisner, who tells Nick to keep the phone. Nick goes to the hospital to visit Adalind and their newborn son; Adalind names the child Kelly, after Nick's mother. Opening quote: "It is not light that we need, but fire."
| 90 | 2 | "Clear and Wesen Danger" | Norberto Barba | Thomas Ian Griffith | November 6, 2015 | 502 | 3.78 |
Nick takes Adalind and baby Kelly home. Captain Renard assigns Hank a new partner, who is unaware of the whole Wesen thing. Their next case clearly involves a Wesen killer, and complications grow when the US Marshals get involved and the killer flees. With Hank and his partner in pursuit, it becomes evident that these killings are somehow related to a mysterious secret society. Opening quote: "Cherish those who seek the truth but beware of those who find it."
| 91 | 3 | "Lost Boys" | Aaron Lipstadt | Sean Calder | November 13, 2015 | 503 | 3.66 |
Rosalee's life is in danger when a group of orphaned Wesen children – Peter, Lily, Big John, and Miguel – in need of a mother-figure to guide them, decide that Rosalee fits the bill. Nick and Hank find a vital clue in a fairly recent missing-person case. Nick decides to move out of his home to a safer location. Meanwhile, Renard is informed of the King's "accident" and that his daughter is safe with the Resistance. (A basis of Peter Pan and The Lost Boys). Opening quote: "I think I had a mother once."
| 92 | 4 | "Maiden Quest" | Hanelle Culpepper | Brenna Kouf | November 20, 2015 | 504 | 3.62 |
While investigating an assassination attempt against nightclub owner Frankie Adkins, who was saved by a mysterious Wesen, Nick and Hank stumble onto the archaic Wesen tradition of Maagd Zoektocht, by which a Weten Ogen (a lynx-like Wesen) pits three suitors against each other for the hand of a maiden. In the closing scene, a badly injured Trubel shows up at the door of Nick's new home and collapses in his arms. Opening quote: "After three days and nights, whoever tries and does not succeed shall be put to death."
| 93 | 5 | "The Rat King" | David Solomon | Jeff Miller | December 4, 2015 | 505 | 3.69 |
Nick brings a wounded Trubel to the hospital and finds three false IDs and a fingerprint-locked phone in her jacket. Trubel tells the nurse her name is "Lauren Cole", matching one of the IDs and the registration of an expensive, weaponized motorcycle. The next day, Nick and Hank investigate the murder of two Klaustreich, which leads back to a Wesen fairytale. Meanwhile, Andrew Dixon continues to push Captain Renard to endorse his run for mayor. Opening quote: "Rats! They fought the dogs, and killed the cats."
| 94 | 6 | "Wesen Nacht" | Darnell Martin | David Greenwalt & Jim Kouf | December 11, 2015 | 506 | 3.64 |
Trubel tells Nick about Hadrian's Wall, the resistance group Agent Chavez worked with and that Trubel now works for. They are fighting Black Claw, the organization coordinating the global Wesen uprising. Nick, Hank and Wu are called to investigate a series of vandalism, murder, and kidnapping, where they find another claw mark. Opening quote: "Awake, arise, or be forever fall'n."
| 95 | 7 | "Eve of Destruction" | John Behring | Thomas Ian Griffith | January 29, 2016 | 507 | 3.81 |
Nick confronts Trubel, who reveals Chavez's plan to turn Hexenbiest Juliette into a weapon. Monroe, Rosalee, Renard and Hank interrogate Xavier, who reveals the Wesen gang had targeted Nick and Monroe, and any Wesen who doesn't join them will be killed. Monroe and Rosalee alert the Wesen Council, but Alexander is already aware of the problem. Later, a Council member reveals himself to be part of Black Claw and guns down a Council meeting. Opening quote: "I have been bent and broken, but, I hope, into a better shape."
| 96 | 8 | "A Reptile Dysfunction" | David Straiton | Michael Golamco | February 5, 2016 | 508 | 4.42 |
Nick and Hank investigate the death of tourists at Diamond Lake, reported home of the Diamond Lake Monster. Meisner, with Trubel's help, tries to recruit Nick to Hadrian's Wall at its Portland Command Center, funded by a branch of the federal government. Opening quote: "A sucker is born every minute."
| 97 | 9 | "Star-Crossed" | Carlos Avila | Sean Calder | February 12, 2016 | 509 | 4.19 |
Nick and his team hunt for a Wesen serial-killer, a "Fuilcre" who uses an ancient barbaric Wesen water-rune/rain-crucifixion ritual. Monroe goes undercover at a pep rally to help Nick investigate a lead – the rally is actually a recruiting tool for Black Claw. Opening quote: "Only you shall not eat the blood; you shall pour it out on the earth like water."
| 98 | 10 | "Map of the Seven Knights" | Aaron Lipstadt | Jim Kouf | February 19, 2016 | 510 | 4.04 |
In Leipzig, Monroe's uncle Felix Dietrich is asked by Andrea Stroh to appraise books from the estate of Joseph Nebojsa. Two Anubis Wesen from Black Claw kill Andrea, and Felix flees to Portland with one of the books – written by and for Grimms – to sell to Nick. After he is killed, Nick and Monroe find Felix's trunk and take it to the spice shop. Monroe finds a secret compartment and unlocks it, revealing three keys. Using them and the two they had, they create enough of the map of the seven knights to reveal it leads to a spot in the Schwarzwald (The Black Forest, Germany). Opening quote: "History is the nightmare from which I am trying to awake."
| 99 | 11 | "Key Move" | Eric Laneuville | Thomas Ian Griffith | March 4, 2016 | 511 | 4.26 |
Nick and Monroe travel to Germany with false passports to find the treasure of the seven knights. They travel to a church on the map, but local Wesen become suspicious of their questions. That night they go to a spot in the forest where they believe an ancient church stood. They discover chisel marks on old stones before falling into a cavern. Opening quote: "It is not down in any map; true places never are."
| 100 | 12 | "Into the Schwarzwald" | Norberto Barba | David Greenwalt & Jim Kouf | March 11, 2016 | 512 | 3.91 |
Nick and Monroe fall into the catacombs of the ancient church, where they find a small brass chest. As they emerge, they are discovered by the local Wesen and narrowly escape. Meanwhile, Portland mayoral candidate Andrew Dixon is killed by a Marwan assassin. While visiting the spice shop Adalind is threatened by Rosalee's ex, Tony, causing her Hexenbiest powers to return. Renard is confronted with a Black Claw plan to become the new mayoral candidate. Nick and Monroe arrive at the spice shop and open the chest, but all are surprised by the identity of the "treasure" inside - a stick with extraordinary powers. Opening quote: "What's past is prologue."
| 101 | 13 | "Silence of the Slams" | David Straiton | Brenna Kouf | March 18, 2016 | 513 | 4.20 |
Benito is a Wesen who owns Benito's Masks. Goyo, an ambitious professional wrestler, asks for a mask to help him win. Benito tries to dissuade Goyo, but Goyo convinces him he can handle it. Benito makes a mask for him from the skinned face of a Balam. Benito begins to use it, endowing him with great powers, but soon struggles to take it off. Opening quote: "Give a man a mask and he will show his true face."
| 102 | 14 | "Lycanthropia" | Lee Rose | Jeff Miller | March 25, 2016 | 514 | 4.32 |
On the first night of the full moon, a man on his way to visit his mother crashes his car, leaving him to walk three miles. The next day, Nick and Hank, responding to an injured man on the road, meet the driver. When something feels wrong, they ask for Monroe's help and his sense of smell leads them to two bodies. It looks like a Blutbad until Monroe and Rosalee mention a disease, Lycanthropia. Adalind is offered an opportunity to reunite with her missing daughter, Diana; while Eve discovers Black Claw is recruiting Renard. Opening quote: "The world is full of obvious things which nobody by chance ever observes."
| 103 | 15 | "Skin Deep" | Karen Gaviola | Michael Golamco | April 1, 2016 | 515 | 4.05 |
Nick, Hank, and Wu investigate the death of a woman who aged seventy years overnight, only to learn they are dealing with a Wesen, operating as a photographer, who sucks youthfulness out of young people and regurgitates it as a goo. He sells this goo to a doctor operating a clinic that caters to the youth-obsessed. The doctor has created a successful anti-aging cream, for which he has become dependent. Rosalee goes undercover to help expose the racket. Meanwhile, Eve devises a plan to go undercover as Renard to learn more about his involvement with Black Claw. Opening quote: "It is amazing how complete is the delusion that beauty is goodness."
| 104 | 16 | "The Believer" | John Behring | David Greenwalt & Jim Kouf | April 8, 2016 | 516 | 4.25 |
An evangelical preacher named Dwight Eleazer has a tent revival unlike any other, using his Wesen identity to gain more believers. Nick and Hank are called to the scene as things escalate when a group of "true believers" are hell-bent on saving the preacher and his flock by any means necessary. Meanwhile, Captain Renard takes further steps to gain power in local government. Elsewhere, Eve uses Adalind's old hat trick to gain more access to Black Claw. Opening quote: "We are each our own devil, and we make this world our hell."
| 105 | 17 | "Inugami" | Sharat Raju | Kyle McVey | April 15, 2016 | 517 | 3.75 |
When Brian Johnson's head is found under a bridge, Nick and Hank link it to a Japanese Wesen family whose son was previously killed by the victim. Adalind accepts a job at her old law firm while Monroe and Rosalee volunteer to explore the tunnels under Nick's place while she is at work. Meanwhile, Wu is still feeling the after-effects of the fight with the Lycanthrope, including strange dreams and intense headaches. Elsewhere, Rachel has a surprise for Renard, much to his joy. Opening quote: "Revenge is the act of passion; vengeance is an act of justice."
| 106 | 18 | "Good to the Bone" | Peter Werner | Martin Weiss | April 22, 2016 | 518 | 3.89 |
While Hank has dinner with Zuri Ellis, his former therapist, a drunk driver is repeatedly run over by a bird-like Wesen who then uses his tongue to dissolve and ingest his victim's bones. Wu's Lycanthrope symptoms worsen as the full moon draws near. Meanwhile, Rosalee babysits Kelly so Adalind can secretly meet with Renard, but Renard knocks her out and takes her to an unknown location to reunite with Diana. Opening quote: "The evil that men do lives after them; the good is oft interred with their bones."
| 107 | 19 | "The Taming of the Wu" | Terrence O'Hara | Brenna Kouf | April 29, 2016 | 519 | 3.76 |
When Sgt. Wu becomes involved in an altercation that results in the killing of a petty thief, he decides to go to the spice shop and figure out what is happening to him. Meanwhile, Meisner and Trubel go to Diana's safehouse and find she was taken by Black Claw as leverage to convince Renard, Adalind, and Nick to join their cause. Not knowing what to do, Adalind takes Kelly and disappears, leaving Nick a note saying that she has to protect her children and Nick. Opening quote: "Nothing is so painful to the human mind as a great and sudden change."
| 108 | 20 | "Bad Night" | Norberto Barba | Sean Calder | May 13, 2016 | 520 | 3.39 |
Nick is distraught over Adalind leaving with Kelly, but contacts Hadrian's Wall. Renard asks Nick to come to the police station with news the Grimm will not want to hear. Meanwhile, Hank arrests Tony (Rosalee's ex) for breaking into Zuri's house, only to discover things are more complicated. Nick shows Trubel the treasure they found in Germany in case something happens to him. Renard is elected to mayor. Opening quote: "We have to distrust each other. It is our only defense against betrayal."
| 109 | 21 | "The Beginning of the End" | David Greenwalt | David Greenwalt & Jim Kouf | May 20, 2016 | 521 | 4.03 |
| 110 | 22 | "The Beginning of the End" | Norberto Barba | Thomas Ian Griffith | May 20, 2016 | 522 | 4.03 |
After Renard is declared mayor, Hank is arrested when two bodies are found in his house. Nick realizes this was set-up by Black Claw and, with Monroe's help, learns Hank's location from Tony. Nick, Trubel, and Eve go to rescue Hank, only to find out this was a trap to get them away from the Hadrian's Wall headquarters. They return to find everyone dead, including Meisner. Unable to control himself, Nick attacks Renard at the police station and Renard has him arrested for assault. Black Claw starts to make their move when they learn of Nick's arrest. Wu calls the others when the station is bombarded with 911 calls, leaving it almost empty. While Monroe and Rosalee hide the Grimm books and weapons, the other hurry to the station, but find Nick has already been taken by Black Claw. They manage to rescue him, but Eve is injured by Conrad Bonaparte, a Zauberbiest and leader of Black Claw. Nick tries to heal Eve with the stick, only to realize Bonaparte knows their location. Nick stays and fights while the others escape in the tunnels. With the stick constantly healing him, Nick kills all the attackers. Bonaparte and Renard then appear. Just as Bonaparte attempts to kill Nick, Diana – in retaliation for painfully coercing Adalind to reveal Nick's location – takes control of Renard's body long enough to kill Bonaparte. Opening quote (Part 1): "It is better to die on your feet than to live on your knees." Opening quote (Part 2): "All the world is a will to power..."

== Ratings ==
| No. | Episode | Air date | Time slot (EST) | Rating/share (18–49) | Viewers (millions) | DVR (18–49) | DVR viewers (millions) | Total (18–49) | Total viewers (millions) |
|---|---|---|---|---|---|---|---|---|---|
| 1 | "The Grimm Identity" | October 30, 2015 | Fridays; 9:00 P.M. | 1.1/4 | 4.04 | 0.8 | 2.32 | 1.9 | 6.36 |
| 2 | "Clear and Wesen Danger" | November 6, 2015 | Fridays; 9:00 P.M. | 1.0/4 | 3.78 | 0.8 | 2.37 | 1.8 | 6.15 |
| 3 | "Lost Boys" | November 13, 2015 | Fridays; 9:00 P.M. | 0.9/3 | 3.66 | 0.7 | 2.25 | 1.6 | 5.91 |
| 4 | "Maiden Quest" | November 20, 2015 | Fridays; 9:00 P.M. | 0.9/3 | 3.62 | 0.8 | 2.59 | 1.7 | 6.21 |
| 5 | "The Rat King" | December 4, 2015 | Fridays; 9:00 P.M. | 0.8/3 | 3.69 | 0.8 | 2.42 | 1.6 | 6.11 |
| 6 | "Wesen Nacht" | December 11, 2015 | Fridays; 9:00 P.M. | 0.9/3 | 3.64 | 0.9 | 2.70 | 1.8 | 6.34 |
| 7 | "Eve of Destruction" | January 29, 2016 | Fridays; 9:00 P.M. | 0.8/3 | 3.81 | 0.8 | 2.23 | 1.6 | 6.04 |
| 8 | "A Reptile Dysfunction" | February 5, 2016 | Fridays; 9:00 P.M. | 0.9/3 | 4.42 | 0.8 | 2.38 | 1.7 | 6.80 |
| 9 | "Star-Crossed" | February 12, 2016 | Fridays; 9:00 P.M. | 0.9/3 | 4.19 | 0.8 | 2.60 | 1.7 | 6.78 |
| 10 | "Map of the Seven Knights" | February 19, 2016 | Fridays; 9:00 P.M. | 0.9/3 | 4.04 | 0.8 | 2.53 | 1.7 | 6.56 |
| 11 | "Key Move" | March 4, 2016 | Fridays; 9:00 P.M. | 1.0/4 | 4.26 | 0.7 | 2.41 | 1.7 | 6.69 |
| 12 | "Into the Schwarzwald" | March 11, 2016 | Fridays; 9:00 P.M. | 0.9/3 | 3.94 | 0.8 | 2.30 | 1.7 | 6.24 |
| 13 | "Silence of the Slams" | March 18, 2016 | Fridays; 9:00 P.M. | 1.0/4 | 4.20 | 0.7 | 2.11 | 1.7 | 6.30 |
| 14 | "Lycanthropia" | March 25, 2016 | Fridays; 9:00 P.M. | 0.9/4 | 4.32 | 0.8 | 2.29 | 1.7 | 6.61 |
| 15 | "Skin Deep" | April 1, 2016 | Fridays; 9:00 P.M. | 0.9/4 | 4.05 | 0.7 | 2.20 | 1.6 | 6.25 |
| 16 | "The Believer" | April 8, 2016 | Fridays; 9:00 P.M. | 0.9/4 | 4.25 | 0.8 | 2.26 | 1.7 | 6.51 |
| 17 | "Inugami" | April 15, 2016 | Fridays; 9:00 P.M. | 0.8/3 | 3.75 | 0.7 | 2.21 | 1.5 | 5.96 |
| 18 | "Good to the Bone" | April 22, 2016 | Fridays; 9:00 P.M. | 0.9/3 | 3.89 | 0.6 | 2.05 | 1.5 | 5.93 |
| 19 | "The Taming of the Wu" | April 29, 2016 | Fridays; 9:00 P.M. | 0.8/3 | 3.76 | 0.7 | 2.07 | 1.5 | 5.86 |
| 20 | "Bad Night" | May 13, 2016 | Fridays; 9:00 P.M. | 0.8/3 | 3.39 | 0.7 | 2.32 | 1.5 | 5.72 |
| 21 22 | "The Beginning of the End" | May 20, 2016 | Fridays; 9:00 P.M. | 0.9/4 | 4.03 | 0.8 | 2.22 | 1.7 | 6.29 |
