= David Greenwalt =

American screenwriter, director, and producer

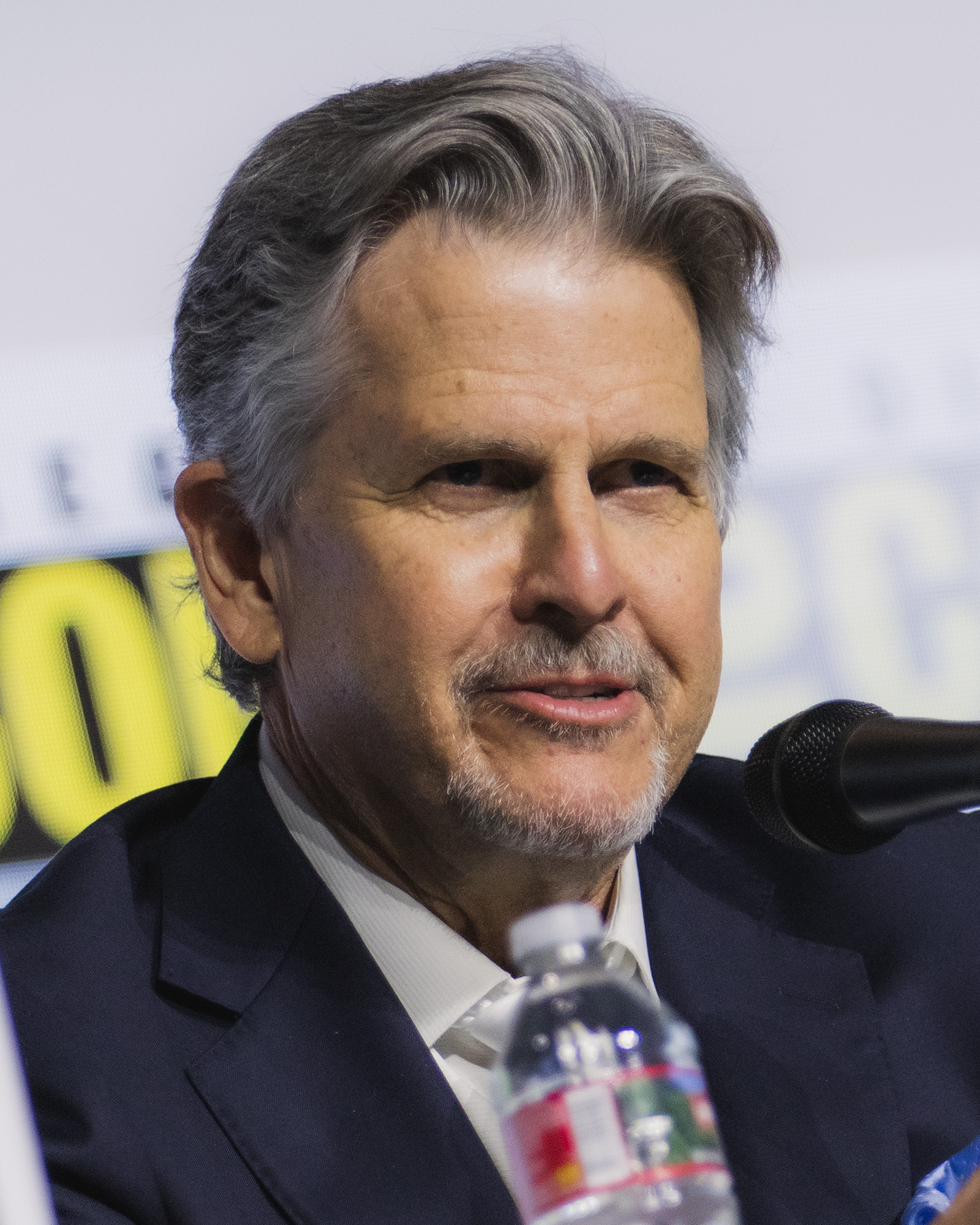
- Greenwalt in 2026
- Born: October 16, 1949 (age 77); West Los Angeles, California, U.S.
- Occupations: screenwriter, television producer, television director
- Spouse: Veronica Greenwalt

David Greenwalt (born October 16, 1949) is an American screenwriter, director, and producer.

He was the co-executive producer of the TV series Buffy the Vampire Slayer and co-creator of its spinoff, Angel. He is also co-creator of the Fox series Profit and the NBC supernatural drama Grimm.

== Early life ==
Greenwalt was born and raised in West Los Angeles, California. He attended Los Angeles City College, California State University, Northridge, and University of Redlands, where he graduated with a B.A. in drama, English, and education.

== Credits ==
=== Buffy the Vampire Slayer ===
Greenwalt was a co-executive producer on Buffy until the show's third season, when he was promoted to executive producer. He left the show at the end of the third season to co-create the spin-off series Angel with Joss Whedon. He was credited as a consulting producer on Buffy from Season 4 until the sixth season, although did not write or direct any episodes.

- 1x04 "Teacher's Pet" (writer)
- 1x07 "Angel" (writer)
- 1x10 "Nightmares" (teleplay; story with Joss Whedon)
- 2x03 "School Hard" (teleplay and story; story by Joss Whedon)
- 2x05 "Reptile Boy" (writer and director)
- 2x11 "Ted" (co-writer; with Joss Whedon)
- 2x12 "Bad Eggs" (director)
- 3x03 "Faith, Hope & Trick" (writer)
- 3x05 "Homecoming" (writer and director)
- 3x09 "The Wish" (director)

=== Angel ===
Greenwalt was an executive producer and served as the showrunner for the first three seasons. He left the staff at the end of the third season to pursue other works, and was credited as a consulting producer for the final two seasons. He returned in the fifth season to direct an episode.

- 1x01 "City Of" (co-writer; with Joss Whedon)
- 1x04 "I Fall to Pieces" (teleplay and story; story with Joss Whedon)
- 1x05 "Rm w/a Vu" (story; teleplay and story by Jane Espenson)
- 1x08 "I Will Remember You" (co-writer; with Jeannine Renshaw)
- 1x13 "She" (co-writer and director; with Marti Noxon)
- 1x14 "I've Got You Under My Skin" (story; teleplay and story by Jeannine Renshaw)
- 1x22 "To Shanshu in L.A." (writer and director)
- 2x01 "Judgment" (teleplay and story; story with Joss Whedon)
- 2x05 "Dear Boy" (writer and director)
- 2x09 "The Trial" (story; teleplay by Doug Petrie and Tim Minear)
- 2x13 "Happy Anniversary" (teleplay and story; story with Joss Whedon)
- 2x18 "Dead End" (writer)
- 2x22 "There's No Place Like Plrtz Glrb" (writer and director)
- 3x01 "Heartthrob" (writer and director)
- 3x07 "Offspring" (writer)
- 3x16 "Sleep Tight" (writer)
- 3x22 "Tomorrow" (writer and director)
- 5x20 "The Girl in Question" (director)

=== Moonlight ===
On June 1, 2007, The Hollywood Reporter announced that he would serve as executive producer and showrunner on Moonlight, a similarly themed vampire detective show. He later had to leave the show prior to its debut for health reasons, but executive producer Joel Silver stated that his imprint would remain: "He worked really hard on the arc of the series. He really helped us focus and get started."

=== Grimm ===
Greenwalt is the co-creator and executive producer alongside fellow ex Angel writer Jim Kouf.

- 1x01 "Pilot" (teleplay and story; story with Jim Kouf and Stephen Carpenter; teleplay with Jim Kouf)
- 1x02 "Bears Will Be Bears" (co-writer; with Jim Kouf)
- 1x05 "Danse Macabre" (co-writer; with Jim Kouf)
- 1x13 "Three Coins in a Fuchsbau" (co-writer; with Jim Kouf)
- 1x15 "Island of Dreams" (co-writer; with Jim Kouf)
- 1x20 "Happily Ever Aftermath" (co-writer; with Jim Kouf)
- 1x22 "Woman in Black" (co-writer; with Jim Kouf)
- 2x01 "Bad Teeth" (co-writer; with Jim Kouf)
- 2x02 "The Kiss" (co-writer; with Jim Kouf)
- 2x12 "Season of the Hexenbiest" (teleplay; with Jim Kouf)
- 2x13 "Face Off" (co-writer; with Jim Kouf)
- 2x18 "Volcanalis" (co-writer; with Jim Kouf)
- 2x21 "The Waking Dead" (co-writer; with Jim Kouf)
- 2x22 "Goodnight, Sweet Grimm" (co-writer; with Jim Kouf)
- 3x01 "The Ungrateful Dead" (co-writer; with Jim Kouf)
- 3x02 "PTZD" (co-writer; with Jim Kouf)
- 3x12 "The Wild Hunt" (co-writer; with Jim Kouf)
- 3x13 "Revelation" (co-writer; with Jim Kouf)
- 3x19 "Nobody Knows the Trubel I've Seen" (co-writer; with Jim Kouf)
- 3x22 "Blond Ambition" (co-writer; with Jim Kouf)
- 4x01 "Thanks for the Memories" (co-writer; with Jim Kouf)
- 4x02 "Octopus Head" (co-writer; with Jim Kouf)
- 4x10 "Tribunal" (co-writer; with Jim Kouf)
- 4x12 "Maréchaussée" (co-writer; with Jim Kouf)
- 4x19 "Iron Hans" (co-writer; with Jim Kouf)
- 4x21 "Headache" (co-writer; with Jim Kouf)
- 5x01 "The Grimm Identity" (co-writer; with Jim Kouf)
- 5x06 "Wesen Nacht" (co-writer; with Jim Kouf)
- 5x12 "Into the Schwarzwald" (co-writer; with Jim Kouf)
- 5x16 "The Believer" (co-writer; with Jim Kouf)
- 5x21 "Set Up" (director, co-writer; with Jim Kouf)
- 6x01 "Fugitive" (co-writer; with Jim Kouf)
- 6x02 "Trust Me Knot" (co-writer; with Jim Kouf)
- 6x12 "Zerstörer Shrugged" (story; with Jim Kouf)
- 6x13 "The End" (director, co-writer; with Jim Kouf)

== Trivia ==
- After he left Angel to do Jake 2.0, both shows ended up competing against each other on Wednesday nights at 9/8c on The WB and UPN respectively in the 2003–2004 season. Both series were cancelled at the end of that season.
- In the Superman comic #180 Superman battles Dracula and in Dracula's "wine" cellar is a bottle of blood marked "Mr. David Greenwalt - 1949-1999". One of the contributors to the comic was Joss Whedon, who worked with David Greenwalt on Buffy the Vampire Slayer and Angel.

== Filmography ==
- Wacko (with Jim Kouf, Dana Olsen and Michael Spound) (1982)
- Utilities (with Jim Kouf) (1983)
- Class (with Jim Kouf) (1983)
- American Dreamer (with Jim Kouf) (1984)
- Secret Admirer (with Jim Kouf) (1985)
- Help Wanted: Kids (1986) (TV) (director only)
- Double Switch (1987) (TV) (director only)
- Rude Awakening (1989) (co-director only, with Aaron Russo)
- Shannon's Deal (1990) (TV)
- Exile (1990) (TV) (director only)
- The Wonder Years (1991–1992) (TV)
- Doogie Howser M.D. (1992) (TV)
- The Commish (1993–1995) (TV)
- Profit (1996) (TV)
- The X-Files (1997) (TV)
- Buffy the Vampire Slayer (1997–1998)
- Angel (1999–2004) (TV) (also co-creator)
- Miracles (2003) (TV)
- Jake 2.0 (2003) (TV)
- Surface (2005) (TV)
- Eureka (2006) (TV) (consulting producer only)
- Kidnapped (2006) (TV)
- Moonlight (2007) (TV)
- In Plain Sight (2010) (TV) (consulting producer only)
- Grimm (2011–2017) (TV) (also co-creator)
