= Dr. Ken =

- Genre: Sitcom
- Created by: Jared Stern & Ken Jeong & John Fox
- Showrunner: Mike Sikowitz
- Starring: Ken Jeong; Suzy Nakamura; Tisha Campbell-Martin; Jonathan Slavin; Albert Tsai; Krista Marie Yu; Kate Simses; Dana Lee; Dave Foley
- Music by: Gabriel Mann
- Country of origin: United States
- Original language: English
- No. of seasons: 2
- No. of episodes: 44

Production
- Executive producers: Mike Sikowitz; Jared Stern; John Davis & John Fox; Scott Ellis; Ken Jeong; Mike O'Connell; Mary Fitzgerald
- Producer: Patrick Kienlen
- Production locations: Sony Pictures Studios, Culver City, California
- Cinematography: Gregg Heschong; Wayne Kennan
- Editor: Andy Zall
- Camera setup: Multi-camera
- Running time: 30 minutes
- Production companies: Old Charlie Productions; Davis Entertainment; ABC Studios; Sony Pictures Television

Original release
- Network: ABC
- Release: October 2, 2015 – March 31, 2017

Dr. Ken is an American multi-camera sitcom that aired on ABC from October 2, 2015, to March 31, 2017. The series was created, written, and co-executive produced by its lead actor, Ken Jeong, who based the concept on his experience as a physician prior to becoming a stand-up comedian. The series is an ABC Studios/Sony Pictures Television co-production.

On October 20, 2015, ABC ordered a full season of 22 episodes for the first season. On May 12, 2016, the series was renewed for a second season, which premiered on September 23, 2016. On May 11, 2017, ABC cancelled the series after two seasons.

== Premise ==
Dr. Ken is about a Korean-American doctor (Ken Jeong), with a questionable bedside manner; his wife, a talented therapist (Suzy Nakamura); and his two children: son Dave (Albert Tsai) and daughter Molly (Krista Marie Yu).

== Cast ==
=== Main ===
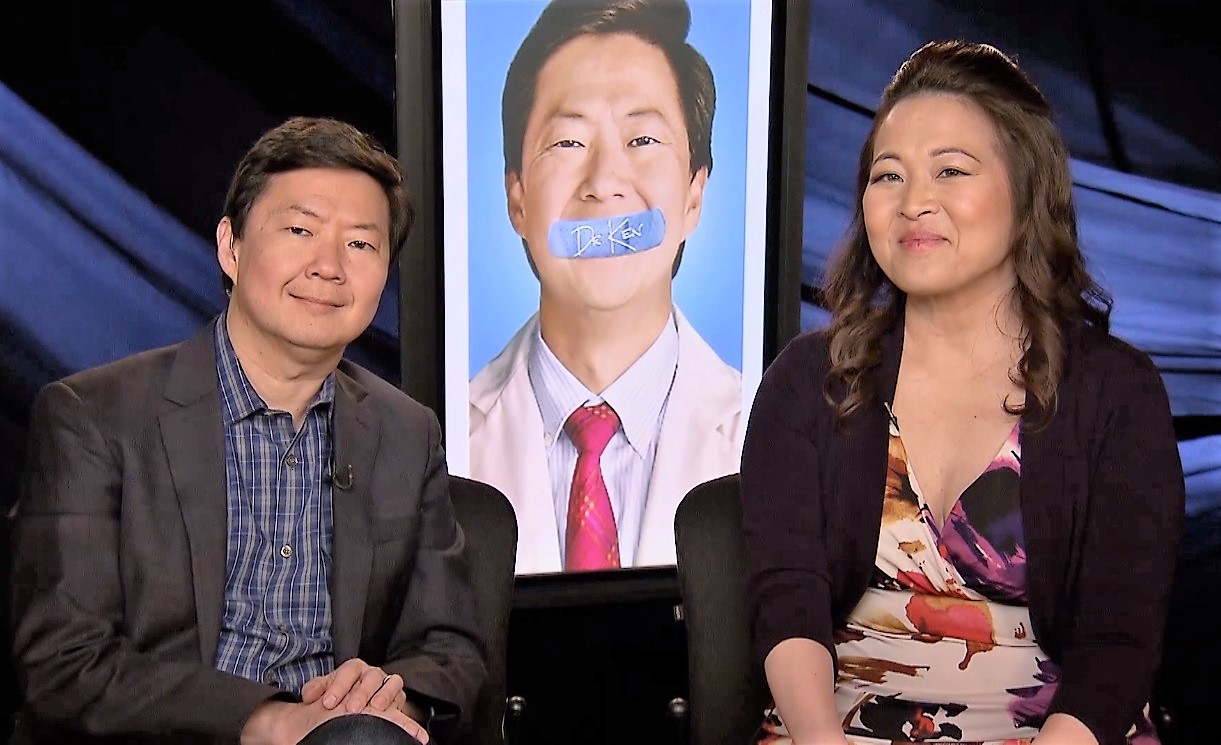
Ken Jeong and Suzy Nakamura interviewed on Sidewalks in 2017.

- Ken Jeong as Dr. Kendrick "Ken" Park. Ken is a constantly-joking, narcissistic, sometimes-thoughtless general practitioner employed at Welltopia Medical Group. He loves his family and coworkers but is often oblivious to their feelings. He has a younger sister, Dr. Wendi (Margaret Cho), of whom he is jealous.
- Suzy Nakamura as Dr. Allison Park (née Kuramata). Allison is Ken's intelligent Japanese-American wife and mother to Molly and Dave. She is a trained therapist/psychiatrist and often gives Ken advice about his life. Her children have a tendency to treat her with more respect than Ken. Allison usually tolerates Ken's antics, using them as an opportunity to push him to become a better man, although she occasionally becomes fed up with him.
- Tisha Campbell-Martin as Damona Watkins. Damona is the sassy and loud-mouthed office manager at Welltopia where Dr. Ken works. While she is technically under the jurisdiction of Dr. Park, she is seen as his equal in the office. She develops a sexual relationship with Pat, although she hates herself for it. It is revealed that she controls the schedules and vacation days for the office.
- Jonathan Slavin as Clark Leslie Beavers. Clark is a registered nurse who works with Ken and is usually his most devoted fan in the office. He is openly gay and prone to speaking in a loud volume when nervous or scared. He is a bit of a drama queen and can overreact to many situations. He is good friends with Damona and Dr. Julie Dobbs.
- Albert Tsai as Dave Park. Dave is Ken's son, age ten at the start of the series, who is considered "odd" among his peers and family. Though intelligent, he has a number of strange quirks, such as biting people when he feels cornered and conserving water to a drastic measure for the drought. When he is sad, he will eat food without utensils in bed. It is implied numerous times that he is not popular in school. Ken, Allison, and Molly often attempt to bribe him with pizza.
- Krista Marie Yu as Molly Park. Molly is Ken's daughter, age sixteen at the start of the series, and is a typical American teenager, obsessed with hanging out with friends, texting, and boys, though she is also very studious. She has several love interests throughout the series and has a habit of disobeying her parents. While she often tries to deceive her parents and brother, she does show some affection toward her family.
- Kate Simses as Dr. Julie Dobbs (season 1). Julie is Ken's protege and a trained doctor, although she is unsure of herself. She speaks in a nervous, high-pitched voice and is referred to as "fragile" by both herself and coworkers. She has a tendency to keep on talking when she's nervous, divulging Ken's secrets. She is an extremely thorough worker, to the point of spending three hours with a patient. On the season 2 premiere, it was revealed that she left the hospital to do a medical internship elsewhere.
- Dave Foley as Pat Hein. Ken's boss and the manager at Welltopia, Pat is an insensitive and slightly racist man who often is the butt of the joke. Although he considers himself a benevolent dictator among his coworkers, he's shown to be duped on several occasions since Ken, Damona and Clark are well aware that Pat frequently has ulterior motives. After separating from his wife, he lives on a boat parked outside her house. He fancies himself as a ladies' man, although he only succeeds in sleeping with Damona.
- Dana Lee as D.K. Park, Ken's stern, traditional father (season 2, recurring season 1). In the season 2 premiere, he starts to live in the Park household, saying his wife In-Sook (Ken's mother) left to visit family in Korea for a year. D.K. later confesses he and In-Sook are divorced. As he started living with his son's family, he gets more flexible in adapting to American cultures, such as being in a relationship with an American woman his age, much to Ken's dismay.

=== Recurring ===
- Marques Ray as Juan-Julio, the parking garage attendant at Welltopia
- Alexis Rhee as In-Sook Park, Ken's mother and D.K.'s ex-wife
- Stephen Guarino as Connor, Clark's partner and later husband
- Jerry Minor as Eric, Damona's boyfriend after she moves on from Pat
- Justin Chon as Jae, Molly's boyfriend in Season 2
- Zooey Jeong as Emily, Dave's brief girlfriend in Season 2
- Gillian Vigman as Megan, Pat's brief girlfriend in Season 2

=== Guest stars ===
- Margaret Cho as Dr. Wendi Park, Ken's sister, a talk show host.
- Mehmet Oz as himself
- Will Yun Lee as Dr. Kevin O'Connell
- Joel McHale as Ross
- Danny Pudi as Topher
- Jim Rash as Devon Drake
- Stephen Tobolowsky as Joe
- Ian Chen as Henry
- Randall Park as Gary Chon
- James Urbaniak as James Miller
- George Wyner as Dicky Wexler
- Jeff Ross as Doug
- Betsy Sodaro as Sonja
- Gillian Jacobs as Erin
- Yvette Nicole Brown as Amy
- Rhys Darby as Charles Evans
- Jonathan Banks as Dr. Erwin
- Dan Harmon as himself
- Alison Brie as herself
- Nia Vardalos as Tiffany, Pat's ex-wife

Jeong previously starred alongside guests stars Joel McHale, Danny Pudi, Alison Brie, Gillian Jacobs, Yvette Nicole Brown, Jim Rash and Jonathan Banks on the television comedy series Community. In the episode "Ken's Big Audition", Ken auditions for a fictional version of the show, in which Brie, series creator Dan Harmon, and other Community cast members Erik Charles Nielsen, Danielle Kaplowitz, Richard Erdman and Luke Youngblood also appear.

== Episodes ==
Season	Episodes	Originally released	
Season	Episodes	First released	Last released
1	22	October 2, 2015	April 22, 2016
2	22	September 23, 2016	March 31, 2017

=== Season 1 (2015–16) ===
Season one episodes
No. overall	No. in season	Title	Directed by	Written by	Original release date	Prod. code	U.S. viewers (millions)
1	1	"Pilot"	Scott Ellis	Story by : Jared Stern & Ken Jeong & John Fox; Teleplay by : Jared Stern & Ken Jeong & Mike O'Connell	October 2, 2015	100	6.71
Ken's job is threatened after he makes fun of a patient who believes he just has a small hemorrhoid. Ken's daughter, Molly, passes her driving test, so Ken decides to put a GPS on her, which Allison disapproves of. Ken gets arrested at a rave and while in jail with Clark, he learns that Molly ended her friendship with Avery. At Welltopia, Ken receives an apology from the patient who got a colonoscopy treatment that he recommended, which proved to really be a serious polyp that would've proved fatal had Ken not cared about the patient's well-being by being tough on him.
2	2	"The Seminar"	Scott Ellis	Mary Fitzgerald	October 9, 2015	103	5.72
After Clark writes a patient complaint form against Ken, the latter is forced to take a bedside manners seminar, and the two become enemies. Damona and Julie must team up and help Ken and Clark reconcile. Ken's parents visit his house, and Allison is forced to deal with them while Ken's away.
3	3	"Ken Helps Pat"	Andy Cadiff	Matthew Libman & Daniel Libman	October 16, 2015	102	5.76
When Pat forces everyone to work on Saturdays, Ken tries to get him to change his mind, only to realize Pat's gonna shoot a nail into his toe to win his wife back. When Dave receives a nickname at school, Allison and Ken are on opposite sides over how to handle it.
4	4	"Kevin O'Connell"	Mark Cendrowski	Paul A. Kaplan & Mark Torgove	October 23, 2015	106	5.97
When the gang is invited to a banquet honoring Allison's ex-boyfriend Kevin O'Connell (Will Yun Lee), Molly and Dave wonder if Ken is their real dad. Molly has to decide what she wants to be for a school project, but she's having trouble deciding.
5	5	"Halloween-Aversary"	Anthony Rich	Erik Sommers	October 30, 2015	105	5.77
It's Halloween, so Ken decides to redo his proposal from 20 years ago. When he and Allison get into a fight, it's up to Clark to save the proposal redo. Julie accidentally gives Pat a fentanyl lollipop, so Damona helps her work up the courage to tell him. Molly accidentally wrecks Ken's prized plastic skeleton named Gary and must enlist Dave's help to fix him.
6	6	"Ken Teaches Molly a Lesson"	Andy Cadiff	Mike Sikowitz	November 6, 2015	101	5.38
After Molly drinks at her friends' party, Ken teaches her the dangers of alcohol. When Allison discovers she and Dave haven't had fun together in a while, she invites her son to a book reading.
7	7	"Dr. Wendi: Coming to L.A.!"	Ken Whittingham	Hilary Winston	November 13, 2015	104	5.26
Ken's sister, Dr. Wendi Park (Margaret Cho) invites him to be on her talk show, but they end up arguing on TV. Ken and Wendi's parents reprimand the two for their behavior.
8	8	"Thanksgiving Culture Clash"	Ken Whittingham	Mike O'Connell	November 20, 2015	107	6.07
Ken and Allison suffer estrangement when both their families come for Thanksgiving, leading to a culture clash between them. Molly gets a Japanese Kanji tattoo, which angers both parents. Dave must do a class assignment on his family's Thanksgiving traditions.
9	9	"Ken Cries Foul"	Rob Schiller	Mike Sikowitz	December 4, 2015	109	5.32
Ken gets frustrated when Dave wants to skip his basketball game, preferring to attend a community meeting on water conservation instead. Ken later realizes that his son's happiness is more important than a sporting event.
10	10	"The Master Scheduler"	Beth McCarthy-Miller	Paul O'Toole & Andy St. Clair	December 11, 2015	108	4.80
Allison is excited about an upcoming trip to Hawaii over New Year's weekend, but there is a problem: Ken forgot to submit a form to Damona to get the time off from work. Damona says there is no way she'll be able to get late approval from the "Master Scheduler", which turns out to be a position she just made up.
11	11	"Delayed in Honolulu"	Anthony Rich	Mike Sikowitz	January 8, 2016	113	5.40
Ken and his family are delayed at Honolulu Airport, where Ken makes a bad impression on fellow passenger Dr. Oz and clashes with an airline booking attendant. With Dr. Ken away, Julie is put in charge of the clinic on "Black Monday" (the first work day after the holidays), and her slow, deliberate method of treating patients starts to annoy Damona and Clark. Allison finds herself annoyed with Molly texting her boyfriend, and tries to show her another example. Dave wins money playing poker with some college kids, and gets to board early by bribing the gate agent with the few bucks he won.
12	12	"Ken's Physical"	Victor Gonzalez	Paul A. Kaplan & Mark Torgrove	January 15, 2016	111	5.28
When Allison gets upset that Ken hasn't had a physical in years, Julie arranges to do the physical in order to prove her skills. Damona pulls a prank on Clark at work, and Clark's attempt to prank her back fails miserably. Meanwhile, Molly is having trouble landing a job to pay for a ski trip, due to her being fired consistently. Ken must also deal with Dave being invited to dinner with the camera crew that is shooting a commercial next door, then having dinner with Barb and her husband, Andy, whom Ken dislikes.
13	13	"D.K. and the Dishwasher"	Scott Ellis	Mary Fitzgerald	January 29, 2016	114	5.13
Ken's stern father spends two weeks with the family, and starts to make his son feel inadequate by fixing all the things on Ken's lengthy to-do list while also usurping Ken's fatherly role. At the office, Damona reveals that she and Pat slept together after getting drunk at a party. Though insisting it was a one-time thing, Damona is still hurt when Pat announces that the incident inspired him to get back together with his wife.
14	14	"Dave's Valentine"	Anthony Rich	Paul O'Toole & Andy St. Clair	February 5, 2016	116	4.81
Dave wants to take a girl in his class to a Valentine's Day dance, but Ken is against it because the girl's dad is an ambulance-chasing lawyer (Joel McHale) who once took Ken to court. Elsewhere, Damona and Pat attend Julie's Valentine's Day party as a couple, where Damona also helps Julie stand up to her unreliable boyfriend, Topher (Danny Pudi).
15	15	"The Wedding Sitter"	Anthony Rich	Daniel Libman & Matthew Libman	February 19, 2016	112	4.89
Ken and Allison are invited to a wedding for one of Ken's coworkers, where Allison finally reveals she hates it when Ken is a "selfish dancer". Damona, Julie and Clark are all invited at the last minute, but they wind up at the wrong reception and they get thrown out, forcing Clark to separate from Connor, an interesting guy he had just met there. At home, Molly doesn't want to babysit Dave, so she gets an elderly neighbor to watch him. Dave then gets his Asian American friend Henry (Ian Chen from Fresh Off the Boat) to come over so he can leave the house too, hoping the senile old woman won't notice the switch.
16	16	"Meeting Molly's Boyfriend"	Victor Gonzalez	Nicole Sun	February 26, 2016	110	5.12
Ken is impressed with Molly's new boyfriend Sean but when Allison talks to Sean's mom (who is one of her patients), it appears that Sean is cheating on Molly with a girl named Chloe. After Ken tries to get Sean to confess, Molly reveals she had an "overlap" with her old boyfriend and Sean because she thought Sean was still with Chloe. Because of this incident, Ken learns that Allison had an overlap with him and an old boyfriend twenty years ago when they first dated. At work, Pat tries to butter up the staff to give him good performance reviews.
17	17	"Ken at the Concert"	Scott Ellis	Nicole Sun	March 4, 2016	115	4.75
Ken gets Molly tickets to a concert by a popular boy band when he feels like he doesn't spend enough time with her, but she pushes him away when he embarrasses her in front of her friends. Meanwhile, Damona tries to break up with Pat, and Dave steps on a nail and goes to drastic measures to avoid getting a tetanus shot.
18	18	"Dicky Wexler's Last Show"	Mark Cendrowski	Erik Sommers	March 11, 2016	117	4.53
Ken is delighted when his long-time favorite patient/comedian Dicky Wexler (George Wyner) comes in for a checkup. Unfortunately, tests reveal that Dicky’s cancer has come back and he must stay at the hospital, keeping him from performing what was going to be his last stand-up show. But Ken is determined to get Dicky what he wants! Meanwhile, Allison runs into a former patient coming out of another therapist’s office, causing her to question her own abilities and friendship with the woman.
19	19	"Ken's an Expert Witness"	Jean Sagal	Mike O'Connell	March 18, 2016	118	5.23
When Ken is invited to be a medical expert witness at a trial, his confidence level, normally quite high anyway, goes through the roof. However, when the plaintiff’s lawyer (guest star Jim Rash) hammers him and shreds his credibility on the stand, Ken’s confidence wavers. With the help of the HMO staff, Ken regains his swagger, both in and out of the courtroom. Meanwhile at home, Allison helps Dave sew a replica designer dress for Molly, in the hopes of winning her respect and appreciation. Also, Julie accompanies Juan-Julio to his lip-synch show and becomes part of his act, making her think Juan-Julio likes her romantically.
20	20	"Dave's Sex Talk"	Eric Dean Seaton	Hilary Winston	April 8, 2016	119	4.68
Dave gets an impromptu birds-and-the-bees talk from Julie after Ken has been avoiding it, but he's not off the hook with Allison when she learns he took full credit. Meanwhile, Clark thinks his boyfriend is about to break up with him, and he gets dubious advice from Pat on how to handle the situation.
21	21	"Korean Men's Club"	Anthony Rich	Farhan Arshad	April 15, 2016	121	4.70
Ken, at the insistence of Allison, reluctantly joins a civics-minded community group, which turns out to be filled with Korean party animals. Elsewhere, the HMO staff sees that Pat is living in his office and, despite Clark's vehement objections, Julie tells Pat about an available apartment in Clark's building.
22	22	"Ken Tries Stand-Up"	Anthony Rich	Richard Lowe	April 22, 2016	120	4.59
A visit from Ken's college friend Doug (guest star Jeff Ross), a touring stand-up comedian, ultimately spurs Ken to pursue his own lifelong dream of stand-up comedy. But when he tries to come up with material, he quickly realizes it's not as easy as he thought, and his appearance at an open mic event doesn't initially go as planned. Meanwhile, D.K. tries to get Dave to exercise more by offering to buy him a video game if his grandson can beat him at various physical challenges.

=== Season 2 (2016–17) ===
Season two episodes
No. overall	No. in season	Title	Directed by	Written by	Original release date	Prod. code	U.S. viewers (millions)
23	1	"Allison's Career Move"	Phill Lewis	Mike Sikowitz	September 23, 2016	201	4.02
Allison is fed up with the longer hours and stress at her private practice job, and Pat overhears Ken talking about it with Clark and Damona. Pat wants to offer Allison an open position in Welltopia's psychiatric ward, but Ken tries to dissuade him, feeling some "healthy separation" from his wife is a good thing. Pat keeps calling Allison with better offers until she accepts. Elsewhere, Molly is upset over low scores on her first SAT test and tries to hide the results from her parents, while Clark worries over still not knowing what his boyfriend Connor's job is after three months together. At the end of the episode, D.K. enters the home, saying his wife is in Korea until the end of the year and he will be living with Ken and Allison for a while.
24	2	"Ken and Allison Share a Patient"	Phill Lewis	Tim Doyle	September 30, 2016	202	3.85
Ken cannot find any physical causes for a patient's symptoms, so he suggests Allison do a psych evaluation and "throw some pills" at the problem. Ken is then embarrassed in front of his colleagues when Allison sends the patient back to him, saying he must have missed something. Meanwhile, Pat wants more from his relationship with Damona than just sex, so he tells her about a made-up girlfriend named Cheryl to make her jealous. But his strategy backfires when Damona announces she's begun dating a very real man named Eric (Jerry Minor). At home, D.K. tries to give Dave the confidence to be more sociable as he starts middle school.
25	3	"Ken's Banquet Snub"	Phill Lewis	Hilary Winston	October 7, 2016	203	3.90
Ken is upset when he learns he will not be the MC for the annual HMO banquet this year, after doing the honors the past few years. He later finds out that Pat is the emcee. On banquet night, Pat's car breaks down on the freeway and Ken briefly considers taking his place, but instead leaves to help his boss. With both men gone, Allison takes over the emcee role. Elsewhere, Dave learns he has an admirer, though she seems to be more of a stalker.
26	4	"Dr. Ken: Child of Divorce"	Phill Lewis	Mary Fitzgerald	October 14, 2016	204	4.13
While out having lunch with colleagues, Ken sees his father dining with another woman and kissing her. When Ken confronts him, D.K. confesses that he and Ken's mother got divorced...two years ago. This causes Ken to worry about sustaining his marriage to Allison, while Dave feels like his relationship with new girlfriend Emily is ultimately doomed. Molly, who is taking an A.P. psychology class, tries to play therapist for both Dave and her father.
27	5	"D.K.'s Korean Ghost Story"	Phill Lewis	Jim Brandon & Brian Singleton	October 21, 2016	205	4.43
Allison worries when Dave thinks he's too old to enjoy Halloween. Things change when D.K. tells his grandson a Korean ghost story in which another young boy (played by Ken) wants to grow up too soon. Meanwhile, Molly can't find a costume for a Halloween party, until she learns she can fit into Ken's old outfits.
28	6	"Ken Learns Korean"	Phill Lewis	Mary Fitzgerald	November 4, 2016	206	4.12
Ken is taken aback when he needs an interpreter for a Korean patient and further embarrassed when he thinks D.K.'s card game buddies are making fun of him in Korean, so he goes to Korean language classes with Dave. At the office, Clark is voted to represent the nurses in contract negotiations against Pat, who is representing management. Meanwhile, Molly has been studying hard for her SAT test, and decides to take on her Yale educated mom in a vocabulary war.
29	7	"Dave Goes on Shark Tank"	Mark Cendrowski	Paul O'Toole & Andy St. Clair	November 11, 2016	207	4.41
Dave reveals he's invented a "leg cooling duvet" and has been invited to present the idea on Shark Tank. When Ken sees how other inventors are treated on the show, he worries about Dave's spirit being crushed, but Allison convinces him that Dave needs to learn how to handle criticism and rejection. Meanwhile, Molly accepts an internship at Welltopia to enhance her resume for admission to Stanford University. Pat offers his assistance which leads to a misunderstanding that disappoints Molly, but he ultimately corrects the situation.
30	8	"Allison's Thanksgiving Meltdown"	Anthony Rich	Mike Sikowitz	November 18, 2016	208	4.66
A traffic jam, a mishap with berry crumble, and the family's unwillingness to visit her parents for Thanksgiving lead to Allison exploding at Ken for barely lifting a finger to help with family issues. Elsewhere, Clark convinces Pat, Damona, Eric and Connor to help serve Thanksgiving dinner at a homeless shelter, but Clark soon becomes an unbearable supervisor when he fusses over every little detail.
31	9	"D.K.'s New Girlfriend"	Jude Weng	Nicole Sun	December 2, 2016	209	4.42
Ken and Allison walk into the house to see D.K. walk out of the bedroom with his girlfriend, Linda (Cheryl Bricker). Ken says this is unacceptable so D.K. moves out, but Ken later regrets the way he spoke to his father. Elsewhere, Allison and Molly have a girls' day in a spa only to have Clark and Damona crash their party, while Pat pretends to be Dave's adoptive father to impress a woman named Megan (Gillian Vigman).
32	10	"Ken's Apology"	Anthony Rich	Hilary Winston	December 9, 2016	210	4.45
Ken makes a mistake reading a chart that could have caused serious problems for a patient. The patient is okay and Ken wants to apologize, but Pat prevents him from doing so because a court would see it as an admission of guilt. Meanwhile, D.K. thinks Dave's classes are too easy and asks the school to move him up a grade, which doesn't sit well with Allison because he never checked with her. Elsewhere, D.K. tries to set up Molly with his barber's Korean grandson, Jae. Molly is fully prepared to reject the boy, until she actually meets him.
33	11	"A Park Family Christmas"	Eric Dean Seaton	Tim Doyle	December 16, 2016	211	4.50
Allison offers to host a Christmas party for the Welltopia employees, to show everyone that she can be fun outside of work. Molly worries about the party being a success when she learns that Pat's guest is his old high school friend – now a dean of admissions at Stanford University. D.K. plays a gruff Santa at the library, with Dave as his elf. Meanwhile, Clark prepares a surprise gift for his boyfriend when he brings Connor's mother to town for the party, but he is outdone when Connor's gift is a marriage proposal. (Clark accepts.)
34	12	"Ken's New Intern"	Anthony Rich	Jim Brandon & Brian Singleton	January 6, 2017	212	5.48
Ken confesses to Allison that he thinks his new intern Erin (Gillian Jacobs) is flirting with him. Allison assures him she isn't jealous, but things change when she sees things for herself. Damona reveals she was one of the backup singers on a C+C Music Factory song, but a stand-in was used in the video to lip sync her voice. Eric finds out that C+C Music Factory is the entertainment at an area casino and invites Damona to a date there to help her get closure. Molly tells D.K. that she likes Jae (Justin Chon), the guy her grandpa set her up with, but is upset that Jae hasn't texted or called her since their date.
35	13	"Jae Meets the Parks"	Anthony Rich	Warren Hutcherson	January 13, 2017	213	4.81
Ken and Allison are thrilled to be meeting Molly's boyfriend Jae, especially after learning he is pre-med at UCLA. But when Jae announces he is dropping out of college to pursue his art, Ken shuns him, thinking he will get in the way of Molly's Stanford dreams. Meanwhile, Damona learns that Pat's rule requiring her to wear scrubs does not apply to other non-medical personnel in the building.
36	14	"A Day in the Life"	Anthony Rich	Mary Fitzgerald	January 20, 2017	215	4.63
A reality show about health care in America comes to town and visits Welltopia. Ken sees this as an opportunity to show off his comedy skills rather than just display his prowess as a doctor, while Damona tries to dial back her usual temper for the cameras.
37	15	"Ken and the Basketball Star"	Anthony Rich	Paul O'Toole & Andy St. Clair	January 27, 2017	216	5.18
When Molly's classmate Danny (Zak Henri), a star basketball player, visits Ken with a swollen ankle, Ken sees signs that the boy has a rare heart condition that could end his days of playing competitive sports. At the office, Allison discovers that Pat brought his high-end cappuccino maker to work and is asked to keep it a secret, but Damona quickly figures it out. Meanwhile, after their first few days of living together, Clark complains that Connor's habits are unbearable, but Damona convinces Clark that years of living alone has made him too set in his ways.
38	16	"A Dr. Ken Valentine's Day"	Anthony Rich	Hilary Winston	February 3, 2017	214	4.65
Allison acts like she doesn't want Ken to make a big deal over Valentine's Day, but she secretly does. Molly and Jae rebel against Valentine's Day, calling it a corporate holiday. Dave prepares a special meal for Emily, with D.K.'s help. Pat apologizes to and reconnects with Megan, and they go to dinner at the same restaurant where Pat and Damona used to meet. Damona is there with Eric, who's never been told about her previous relationship with Pat. Meanwhile, Clark prepares a special Valentine's scavenger hunt for Connor, but foolishly counts on Ken to play a key role.
39	17	"Pat's Rash"	Phill Lewis	Lisa McQuillan	February 17, 2017	217	4.23
Pat breaks out in a rash which threatens an important date with Megan. When Ken learns all the tests for allergies came back negative, Allison suggests that the skin condition might be stress-related, causing Pat to realize Megan is not good for him. Meanwhile, Dave overhears his parents' discussion about Pat's toxic relationship and thinks they are referring to him and Emily.
40	18	"Allison Finds a Lump"	Phill Lewis	Jim Brandon & Brian Singleton	February 24, 2017	218	4.56
As Dave prepares to play Peter Pan in a school play, Allison finds a lump while doing a breast self-exam. With Allison's regular doctor on vacation, a worried Ken makes an appointment with another doctor in the Welltopia building. The lump turns out to be non-cancerous, much to everyone's relief. At the office, Pat implies to Damona that he hasn't been happy since their sort-of relationship ended. After a moment's silence, the two embrace and kiss.
41	19	"Ken's Professor"	Mark Cendrowski	Mike O'Connell	March 10, 2017	219	3.91
Ken has to treat Dr. Erwin (Jonathan Banks), his old med school professor who was extremely hard on him, and it seems that nothing has changed. As Damona and Pat assess where their relationship is going, they can't keep their hands off each other. Meanwhile, Allison gets a new assistant (Sarah Baker) who never stops talking.
42	20	"Ken and the CEO"	Ron Moseley	Nicole Sun	March 17, 2017	220	4.43
Charles Evans (Rhys Darby), the CEO of Welltopia, visits the office. With Pat up for a promotion, he asks Ken, who has a good rapport with Charles, to put in a good word for him. But Ken soon finds out that Charles is considering firing Pat. At home, Molly's and Jae's relationship comes to a crossroads when Jae announces he's been accepted by the Rhode Island School of Design and is leaving in two weeks.
43	21	"Clark's Big Surprise"	Phill Lewis	Lisa McQuillan	March 24, 2017	221	4.14
Clark invites Ken and his family and Pat and Damona to a barbecue, not telling them it is actually his and Connor's wedding. Damona decides it's time to let everyone in the office know she and Pat are dating again.
44	22	"Ken's Big Audition"	Phill Lewis	Jim Brandon & Brian Singleton	March 31, 2017	222	4.02
A TV producer calls Ken and says one of his casting people saw him at an open mic night, and would like Ken to audition for a small role in one episode of an upcoming sitcom. Although Ken bombs his audition, his rant afterwards makes the producer (Dan Harmon as himself) like him for a different role on the show. With the new role requiring a regular cast member, Ken has to decide between medicine and his dream of comedy. Almost lost in Ken's excitement is Molly's announcement that she has been accepted at Stanford. Meanwhile, Pat's ex-wife Tiffany (Nia Vardalos) shows up unexpectedly at the office, saying she's changed and wants Pat to give her another chance.

== Reception ==
Dr. Ken received highly negative reviews from television critics. The review aggregator website Rotten Tomatoes reported a 7% approval rating, based on 42 reviews, with an average rating of 2.5/10. The website's consensus reads, "Somebody please get Dr. Ken a doctor; seeking any signs of life. Or humor." On Metacritic, the series has a score of 26 out of 100, based on 20 critics, indicating "generally unfavorable reviews".

Indiewire TV Critic Ben Travers and TV Editor Liz Shannon Miller, both negatively ranked the trailer released for Dr. Ken. Marc Berman of TV Media Insights gave the new series very low odds of survival. During the 2015 Television Critics Association press tour, Ken Jeong defended against a comparison drawn between his series and the ill-fated All American Girl starring Margaret Cho, claiming that he would have more creative control as both a writer and producer of Dr. Ken.

=== Ratings ===
Season	Timeslot (ET)	Episodes	Premiered		Ended		TV season	Rank	Viewers (in millions, including DVR)
Season	Timeslot (ET)	Episodes	Date	Premiere viewers (in millions)	Date	Finale viewers (in millions)	TV season	Rank	Viewers (in millions, including DVR)
1	Friday 8:30 pm	22	October 2, 2015	6.71	April 22, 2016	4.59	2015–16	72	6.13
2	Friday 8:30 pm	22	September 23, 2016	4.02	March 31, 2017	4.02	2016–17	86	5.12
