= Jacqueline Toboni =

American actress (born 1992)

- Born: February 18, 1992 (age 34); San Francisco, California, U.S.
- Education: University of Michigan
- Occupation: Actress
- Years active: 2014–present

Jacqueline Toboni (born February 18, 1992) is an American actress, known for her role as Theresa "Trubel" Rubel on Grimm (2014–2017).

== Early life and education ==
Born February 18, 1992, in San Francisco, Toboni graduated from St. Ignatius College Preparatory in San Francisco in 2010. and from the University of Michigan in 2014.

== Career ==
Toboni is known for her recurring role of Trubel in the NBC drama Grimm from 2014 to 2017.

In 2015, she appeared on one episode of Major Crimes.

Beginning in 2016, she also appeared in five episodes of the Netflix anthology series Easy.

In 2017, she appeared in the sixteenth season of Hell's Kitchen as a guest for episode 11's dinner service that honored the contributors from Stand Up to Cancer.

In 2019, it was announced that she will star in The L Word: Generation Q, a sequel of the hit series The L Word. Her lesbian character Sarah Finley is an executive assistant who works for Alice.

== Personal life ==
On August 18, 2021, Toboni announced her engagement to Australian actress Kassandra Clementi. However, as of August 7, 2022, Kassandra confirmed via an Instagram comment that she and Jacqueline had "separated awhile [sic] ago, amicably".

Her brother, Paul Toboni is the current President of Baseball Operations for Major League Baseball’s Washington Nationals.

== Filmography ==
Film
Year	Title	Role	Notes
2014	Bad Girls	Rachel	Short film
2017	Liked	Kelly	
2019	The Bygone	Jamie	
2020	The Stand at Paxton County	Janna Connelly	
TBA	Moon Lane	Sam	In post-production

Television
Year	Title	Role	Notes
2014–2017	Grimm	Theresa "Trubel" Rubel	Seasons 3–6; Recurring role
2015	Jill Takes LA	Jacqueline Chobani	Main role
2015	Major Crimes	Officer Leanne Tracy	Episode: "Targets of Opportunity"
2016–2019	Easy	Jo	Recurring role
2017	Hell's Kitchen	Herself	Guest diner/Stand Up to Cancer contributor; Episode: "Aerial Maneuvers"
2019–2023	The L Word: Generation Q	Sarah Finley	Main role
2024	Doctor Odyssey	Rosie	Recurring role
