= List of Grimm episodes =

TV series of dark fantasy crime drama

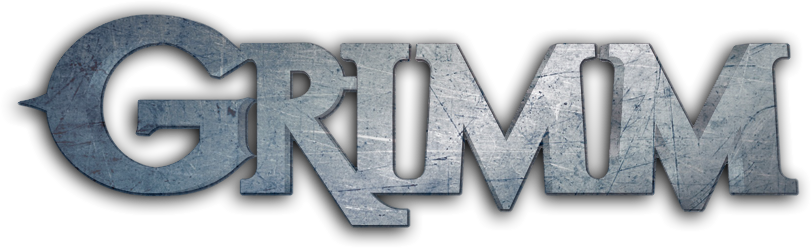

Grimm is an American dark fantasy crime drama television series created by Stephen Carpenter, David Greenwalt and Jim Kouf. The show ran, on NBC, from October 28, 2011, to March 31, 2017. The series follows homicide detective Nick Burkhardt (David Giuntoli) who learns that he is a descendant of a group of hunters known as "Grimms", who fight to keep humanity safe from the supernatural creatures of the world.

A total of 123 episodes of Grimm aired in six seasons.

== Series overview ==
Season	Episodes	Originally released		Rank	Average viewership (in millions)
Season	Episodes	First released	Last released	Rank	Average viewership (in millions)
1	22	October 28, 2011	May 18, 2012	89	6.36
2	22	August 13, 2012	May 21, 2013	60	7.06
3	22	October 25, 2013	May 16, 2014	52	7.97
4	22	October 24, 2014	May 15, 2015	65	6.98
5	22	October 30, 2015	May 20, 2016	76	5.97
6	13	January 6, 2017	March 31, 2017	70	6.07

== Episodes ==
=== Season 1 (2011–12) ===
No. overall	No. in season	Title	Directed by	Written by	Original release date	Prod. code	US viewers (millions)
1	1	"Pilot"	Marc Buckland	Story by : David Greenwalt & Jim Kouf and Stephen Carpenter; Teleplay by : David Greenwalt & Jim Kouf	October 28, 2011	101	6.56
2	2	"Bears Will Be Bears"	Norberto Barba	David Greenwalt & Jim Kouf	November 4, 2011	102	6.01
3	3	"Beeware"	Darnell Martin	Cameron Litvack & Thania St. John	November 11, 2011	103	5.18
4	4	"Lonelyhearts"	Michael Waxman	Alan DiFiore & Dan E. Fesman	November 18, 2011	104	5.44
5	5	"Danse Macabre"	David Solomon	David Greenwalt & Jim Kouf	December 8, 2011	105	4.09
6	6	"The Three Bad Wolves"	Clark Mathis	Naren Shankar & Sarah Goldfinger	December 9, 2011	106	5.43
7	7	"Let Your Hair Down"	Holly Dale	Sarah Goldfinger & Naren Shankar	December 16, 2011	107	5.16
8	8	"Game Ogre"	Terrence O'Hara	Cameron Litvack & Thania St. John	January 13, 2012	108	4.65
9	9	"Of Mouse and Man"	Omar Madha	Alan DiFiore & Dan E. Fesman	January 20, 2012	109	5.92
10	10	"Organ Grinder"	Clark Mathis	Akela Cooper & Spiro Skentzos	February 3, 2012	110	4.79
11	11	"Tarantella"	Peter Werner	Alan DiFiore & Dan E. Fesman	February 10, 2012	111	5.30
12	12	"Last Grimm Standing"	Michael Watkins	Story by : Cameron Litvack & Thania St. John; Teleplay by : Naren Shankar & Sarah Goldfinger	February 24, 2012	112	4.79
13	13	"Three Coins in a Fuchsbau"	Norberto Barba	David Greenwalt & Jim Kouf	March 2, 2012	113	5.30
14	14	"Plumed Serpent"	Steven DePaul	Alan DiFiore & Dan E. Fesman	March 9, 2012	114	5.05
15	15	"Island of Dreams"	Rob Bailey	Jim Kouf & David Greenwalt	March 30, 2012	115	4.15
16	16	"The Thing with Feathers"	Darnell Martin	Richard Hatem	April 6, 2012	116	4.45
17	17	"Love Sick"	David Solomon	Catherine Butterfield	April 13, 2012	117	4.96
18	18	"Cat and Mouse"	Felix Alcala	Jose Molina	April 20, 2012	118	4.56
19	19	"Leave It to Beavers"	Holly Dale	Nevin Densham	April 27, 2012	119	4.33
20	20	"Happily Ever Aftermath"	Terrence O'Hara	David Greenwalt & Jim Kouf	May 4, 2012	120	4.73
21	21	"Big Feet"	Omar Madha	Story by : Alan DiFiore & Dan E. Fesman; Teleplay by : Richard Hatem	May 11, 2012	121	4.45
22	22	"Woman in Black"	Norberto Barba	David Greenwalt & Jim Kouf	May 18, 2012	122	5.10

=== Season 2 (2012–13) ===
No. overall	No. in season	Title	Directed by	Written by	Original release date	Prod. code	US viewers (millions)
23	1	"Bad Teeth"	Norberto Barba	Jim Kouf & David Greenwalt	August 13, 2012	201	5.64
24	2	"The Kiss"	Terrence O'Hara	Jim Kouf & David Greenwalt	August 20, 2012	202	4.90
25	3	"Bad Moon Rising"	David Solomon	Richard Hatem	August 27, 2012	203	4.67
26	4	"Quill"	David Straiton	David Simkins	September 3, 2012	204	4.62
27	5	"The Good Shepherd"	Steven DePaul	Dan E. Fesman	September 28, 2012	205	5.32
28	6	"Over My Dead Body"	Rob Bailey	Spiro Skentzos	October 5, 2012	206	5.29
29	7	"The Bottle Imp"	Darnell Martin	Alan DiFiore	October 12, 2012	207	5.01
30	8	"The Other Side"	Eric Laneuville	William Bigelow	October 19, 2012	208	5.03
31	9	"La Llorona"	Holly Dale	Akela Cooper	October 26, 2012	209	6.11
32	10	"The Hour of Death"	Peter Werner	Sean Calder	November 2, 2012	210	5.64
33	11	"To Protect and Serve Man"	Omar Madha	Dan E. Fesman	November 9, 2012	211	5.21
34	12	"Season of the Hexenbiest"	Karen Gaviola	Story by : Jim Kouf; Teleplay by : Jim Kouf & David Greenwalt	November 16, 2012	212	5.03
35	13	"Face Off"	Terrence O'Hara	Jim Kouf & David Greenwalt	March 8, 2013	213	4.90
36	14	"Natural Born Wesen"	Michael Watkins	Thomas Ian Griffith & Mary Page Keller	March 15, 2013	214	4.91
37	15	"Mr. Sandman"	Norberto Barba	Alan DiFiore	March 22, 2013	215	5.00
38	16	"Nameless"	Charles Haid	Akela Cooper	March 29, 2013	216	4.86
39	17	"One Angry Fuchsbau"	Terrence O'Hara	Richard Hatem	April 5, 2013	217	5.13
40	18	"Volcanalis"	David Grossman	Jim Kouf & David Greenwalt	April 26, 2013	218	4.85
41	19	"Endangered"	David Straiton	Spiro Skentzos	April 30, 2013	219	5.77
42	20	"Kiss of the Muse"	Tawnia McKiernan	Sean Calder	May 7, 2013	220	5.67
43	21	"The Waking Dead"	Steven DePaul	Jim Kouf & David Greenwalt	May 14, 2013	221	5.36
44	22	"Goodnight, Sweet Grimm"	Norberto Barba	Jim Kouf & David Greenwalt	May 21, 2013	222	4.99

=== Season 3 (2013–14) ===
No. overall	No. in season	Title	Directed by	Written by	Original release date	Prod. code	US viewers (millions)
45	1	"The Ungrateful Dead"	Norberto Barba	Jim Kouf & David Greenwalt	October 25, 2013	301	6.15
46	2	"PTZD"	Eric Laneuville	Jim Kouf & David Greenwalt	November 1, 2013	302	4.96
47	3	"A Dish Best Served Cold"	Karen Gaviola	Rob Wright	November 8, 2013	303	4.88
48	4	"One Night Stand"	Steven DePaul	Sean Calder	November 15, 2013	304	5.81
49	5	"El Cucuy"	John Behring	Michael Golamco	November 29, 2013	305	5.73
50	6	"Stories We Tell Our Young"	Aaron Lipstadt	Michael Duggan	December 6, 2013	306	6.32
51	7	"Cold Blooded"	Terrence O'Hara	Thomas Ian Griffith	December 13, 2013	307	4.88
52	8	"Twelve Days of Krampus"	Tawnia McKiernan	Dan E. Fesman	December 13, 2013	308	4.88
53	9	"Red Menace"	Allan Kroeker	Alan DiFiore	January 3, 2014	309	5.68
54	10	"Eyes of the Beholder"	Peter Werner	Thomas Ian Griffith	January 10, 2014	310	5.33
55	11	"The Good Soldier"	Rashaad Ernesto Green	Rob Wright	January 17, 2014	311	5.71
56	12	"The Wild Hunt"	Rob Bailey	Jim Kouf & David Greenwalt	January 24, 2014	312	5.88
57	13	"Revelation"	Terrence O'Hara	Jim Kouf & David Greenwalt	February 28, 2014	313	5.32
58	14	"Mommy Dearest"	Norberto Barba	Brenna Kouf	March 7, 2014	314	5.65
59	15	"Once We Were Gods"	Steven DePaul	Alan DiFiore	March 14, 2014	315	5.63
60	16	"The Show Must Go On"	Paul A. Kaufman	Marc Gaffen & Kyle McVey	March 21, 2014	316	5.71
61	17	"Synchronicity"	David Solomon	Story by : Michael Duggan & Michael Golamco; Teleplay by : Michael Golamco	April 4, 2014	317	4.89
62	18	"The Law of Sacrifice"	Terrence O'Hara	Story by : Michael Duggan & Michael Golamco; Teleplay by : Michael Duggan	April 11, 2014	318	4.73
63	19	"Nobody Knows the Trubel I've Seen"	Norberto Barba	Jim Kouf & David Greenwalt	April 25, 2014	319	4.39
64	20	"My Fair Wesen"	Clark Mathis	Story by : Thomas Ian Griffith & Rob Wright; Teleplay by : Sean Calder	May 2, 2014	320	4.93
65	21	"The Inheritance"	Eric Laneuville	Dan E. Fesman	May 9, 2014	321	4.78
66	22	"Blond Ambition"	Norberto Barba	Jim Kouf & David Greenwalt	May 16, 2014	322	5.34

=== Season 4 (2014–15) ===
No. overall	No. in season	Title	Directed by	Written by	Original release date	Prod. code	US viewers (millions)
67	1	"Thanks for the Memories"	Norberto Barba	David Greenwalt & Jim Kouf	October 24, 2014	401	5.28
68	2	"Octopus Head"	Terrence O'Hara	David Greenwalt & Jim Kouf	October 31, 2014	402	4.54
69	3	"The Last Fight"	Paul Kaufman	Thomas Ian Griffith	November 7, 2014	403	4.93
70	4	"Dyin' on a Prayer"	Tawnia McKiernan	Sean Calder	November 14, 2014	404	5.01
71	5	"Cry Luison"	Eric Laneuville	Michael Golamco	November 21, 2014	405	5.43
72	6	"Highway of Tears"	John Behring	Alan DiFiore	November 28, 2014	406	5.17
73	7	"The Grimm Who Stole Christmas"	John Gray	Dan E. Fesman	December 5, 2014	407	4.96
74	8	"Chupacabra"	Aaron Lipstadt	Brenna Kouf	December 12, 2014	408	5.07
75	9	"Wesenrein"	Hanelle Culpepper	Thomas Ian Griffith	January 16, 2015	409	4.62
76	10	"Tribunal"	Peter Werner	David Greenwalt & Jim Kouf	January 23, 2015	410	5.02
77	11	"Death Do Us Part"	Constantine Makris	Jeff Miller	January 30, 2015	411	4.85
78	12	"Maréchaussée"	Eric Laneuville	David Greenwalt & Jim Kouf	February 6, 2015	412	4.67
79	13	"Trial by Fire"	Norberto Barba	Sean Calder	February 13, 2015	413	4.86
80	14	"Bad Luck"	Terrence O'Hara	Thomas Ian Griffith	March 20, 2015	414	4.78
81	15	"Double Date"	Karen Gaviola	Brenna Kouf	March 27, 2015	415	4.93
82	16	"Heartbreaker"	Rob Bailey	Dan E. Fesman	April 3, 2015	416	4.51
83	17	"Hibernaculum"	John Behring	Michael Golamco	April 10, 2015	417	4.76
84	18	"Mishipeshu"	Omar Madha	Alan DiFiore	April 17, 2015	418	4.54
85	19	"Iron Hans"	Sebastián Silva	David Greenwalt & Jim Kouf	April 24, 2015	419	4.66
86	20	"You Don't Know Jack"	Terrence O'Hara	Sean Calder & Michael Golamco	May 1, 2015	420	4.22
87	21	"Headache"	Jim Kouf	David Greenwalt & Jim Kouf	May 8, 2015	421	4.21
88	22	"Cry Havoc"	Noberto Barba	Thomas Ian Griffith	May 15, 2015	422	4.74

=== Season 5 (2015–16) ===
No. overall	No. in season	Title	Directed by	Written by	Original release date	Prod. code	US viewers (millions)
89	1	"The Grimm Identity"	Eric Laneuville	David Greenwalt & Jim Kouf	October 30, 2015	501	4.04
90	2	"Clear and Wesen Danger"	Norberto Barba	Thomas Ian Griffith	November 6, 2015	502	3.78
91	3	"Lost Boys"	Aaron Lipstadt	Sean Calder	November 13, 2015	503	3.66
92	4	"Maiden Quest"	Hanelle Culpepper	Brenna Kouf	November 20, 2015	504	3.62
93	5	"The Rat King"	David Solomon	Jeff Miller	December 4, 2015	505	3.69
94	6	"Wesen Nacht"	Darnell Martin	David Greenwalt & Jim Kouf	December 11, 2015	506	3.64
95	7	"Eve of Destruction"	John Behring	Thomas Ian Griffith	January 29, 2016	507	3.81
96	8	"A Reptile Dysfunction"	David Straiton	Michael Golamco	February 5, 2016	508	4.42
97	9	"Star-Crossed"	Carlos Avila	Sean Calder	February 12, 2016	509	4.19
98	10	"Map of the Seven Knights"	Aaron Lipstadt	Jim Kouf	February 19, 2016	510	4.04
99	11	"Key Move"	Eric Laneuville	Thomas Ian Griffith	March 4, 2016	511	4.26
100	12	"Into the Schwarzwald"	Norberto Barba	David Greenwalt & Jim Kouf	March 11, 2016	512	3.91
101	13	"Silence of the Slams"	David Straiton	Brenna Kouf	March 18, 2016	513	4.20
102	14	"Lycanthropia"	Lee Rose	Jeff Miller	March 25, 2016	514	4.32
103	15	"Skin Deep"	Karen Gaviola	Michael Golamco	April 1, 2016	515	4.05
104	16	"The Believer"	John Behring	David Greenwalt & Jim Kouf	April 8, 2016	516	4.25
105	17	"Inugami"	Sharat Raju	Kyle McVey	April 15, 2016	517	3.75
106	18	"Good to the Bone"	Peter Werner	Martin Weiss	April 22, 2016	518	3.89
107	19	"The Taming of the Wu"	Terrence O'Hara	Brenna Kouf	April 29, 2016	519	3.76
108	20	"Bad Night"	Norberto Barba	Sean Calder	May 13, 2016	520	3.39
109	21	"The Beginning of the End"	David Greenwalt	David Greenwalt & Jim Kouf	May 20, 2016	521	4.03
110	22	"The Beginning of the End"	Norberto Barba	Thomas Ian Griffith	May 20, 2016	522	4.03

=== Season 6 (2017) ===
No. overall	No. in season	Title	Directed by	Written by	Original release date	Prod. code	US viewers (millions)
111	1	"Fugitive"	Aaron Lipstadt	David Greenwalt & Jim Kouf	January 6, 2017	601	4.49
112	2	"Trust Me Knot"	John Gray	David Greenwalt & Jim Kouf	January 13, 2017	602	4.24
113	3	"Oh Captain, My Captain"	David Giuntoli	Thomas Ian Griffith	January 20, 2017	603	4.29
114	4	"El Cuegle"	Carlos Avila	Brenna Kouf	January 27, 2017	604	4.28
115	5	"The Seven Year Itch"	Lee Rose	Jeff Miller	February 3, 2017	605	4.08
116	6	"Breakfast in Bed"	Julie Herlocker	Kyle McVey	February 10, 2017	606	4.00
117	7	"Blind Love"	Aaron Lipstadt	Sean Calder	February 17, 2017	607	3.92
118	8	"The Son Also Rises"	Peter Werner	Todd Milliner & Nick Peet	February 24, 2017	608	4.01
119	9	"Tree People"	Jim Kouf	Brenna Kouf	March 3, 2017	609	4.23
120	10	"Blood Magic"	Janice Cooke	Thomas Ian Griffith	March 10, 2017	610	3.95
121	11	"Where the Wild Things Were"	Terrence O'Hara	Brenna Kouf	March 17, 2017	611	3.96
122	12	"Zerstörer Shrugged"	Aaron Lipstadt	Story by : David Greenwalt & Jim Kouf; Teleplay by : Brenna Kouf	March 24, 2017	612	4.14
123	13	"The End"	David Greenwalt	Jim Kouf & David Greenwalt	March 31, 2017	613	4.33

== Webisodes ==
=== Bad Hair Day ===
No.	Title	Original release date
1	"A Sore Subject"	January 16, 2013
2	"A Helping Hand"	January 23, 2013
3	"Friendly Neighborhood Eisbiber"	January 30, 2013
4	"Late Night Crisis"	February 6, 2013

=== Meltdown ===
No.	Title	Original release date
1	"Deep Freeze"	October 4, 2013
2	"On Hands and Knees"	October 11, 2013
3	"Tight Squeeze"	October 18, 2013
4	"Dance with the Dammerzustand"	October 25, 2013

=== Love Is in the Air ===
No.	Title	Original release date
1–5	"Elegant Endeavors"	February 14, 2014

== Ratings ==
Grimm : U.S. viewers per episode (millions)

Season	Episode number																					
Season	1	2	3	4	5	6	7	8	9	10	11	12	13	14	15	16	17	18	19	20	21	22
1	6.56	6.01	5.18	5.44	4.09	5.43	5.16	4.65	5.92	4.79	5.30	4.79	5.30	5.05	4.15	4.45	4.96	4.56	4.33	4.73	4.45	5.10
2	5.64	4.90	4.67	4.62	5.32	5.29	5.01	5.03	6.11	5.64	5.21	5.03	4.90	4.91	5.00	4.86	5.13	4.85	5.77	5.67	5.36	4.99
3	6.15	4.96	4.88	5.81	5.73	6.32	4.88	4.88	5.68	5.33	5.71	5.88	5.32	5.65	5.63	5.71	4.89	4.73	4.39	4.93	4.78	5.34
4	5.28	4.54	4.93	5.01	5.43	5.17	4.96	5.07	4.62	5.02	4.85	4.67	4.86	4.78	4.93	4.51	4.76	4.54	4.66	4.22	4.21	4.74
5	4.04	3.78	3.66	3.62	3.69	3.64	3.81	4.42	4.19	4.04	4.26	3.91	4.20	4.32	4.05	4.25	3.75	3.89	3.76	3.39	4.03	4.03
6	4.49	4.24	4.29	4.28	4.08	4.00	3.92	4.01	4.23	3.95	3.96	4.14	4.33	–								

Audience measurement performed by Nielsen Media Research
