= Grimm season 6 =

Grimm
- Season 6
- DVD cover
- No. of episodes: 13

Release
- Original network: NBC
- Original release: January 6 – March 31, 2017

Season chronology
- ← Previous; Season 5

The sixth and final season of the NBC American supernatural drama series Grimm was announced on April 18, 2016. It premiered on January 6 and concluded on March 31, 2017. The season consisted of 13 episodes. The series, created by David Greenwalt, Jim Kouf and Stephen Carpenter, is produced by NBC, GK Productions, Hazy Mills Productions, and Universal Television. The main plot follows a descendant of the Grimm line, Nick Burkhardt, as he deals with being a cop, and trying not to expose his secret as a Grimm.

== Cast and characters ==
=== Main ===
- David Giuntoli as Nick Burkhardt
- Russell Hornsby as Hank Griffin
- Silas Weir Mitchell as Monroe
- Elizabeth Tulloch as Eve
- Reggie Lee as Sergeant Drew Wu
- Sasha Roiz as Captain Sean Renard
- Bree Turner as Rosalee Calvert
- Claire Coffee as Adalind Schade

=== Recurring ===
- Chris McKenna as Lt. Grossante
- Jacqueline Toboni as Theresa "Trubel" Rubel
- Danny Bruno as Bud Wurstner
- Hannah R. Loyd as Diana
- Damien Puckler as Martin Meisner

=== Guest stars ===
- Alla Korot as Dasha Karpushin
- Kevin Joy as Adult Kelly Schade-Burkhardt
- Nicole Steinwedell as Adult Diana Schade-Renard
- Wil Traval as Zerstorer
- Douglas Trait as Skull Zerstorer

=== Special guest stars ===
- Kate Burton as Marie Kessler
- Mary Elizabeth Mastrantonio as Kelly Burkhardt

== Production ==
On December 31, 2016, it was revealed that the sixth season would consist of at least 13 episodes, unlike previous seasons.

=== Casting ===
On July 27, 2016, Chris McKenna was cast as Lt. Grossante, a formidable and driven "military-type" cop.

== Episodes ==
No. overall	No. in season	Title	Directed by	Written by	Original release date	Prod. code	US viewers (millions)
111	1	"Fugitive"	Aaron Lipstadt	David Greenwalt & Jim Kouf	January 6, 2017	601	4.49
After killing Bonaparte, Renard uses his power as mayor and police chief to issue an APB and shoot-to-kill order on Nick, in an attempt to legally blame him for the events at the loft, as well as the North Precinct police station. Forced to lie low, Nick hides in Bud's repair shop, while Juliet/Eve continues to feel complications after being healed. Despite his efforts, Nick is quickly found. The episode ends with Renard giving the order to surround the repair shop. Opening quote: "Maybe this world is another planet's hell."
112	2	"Trust Me Knot"	John Gray	David Greenwalt & Jim Kouf	January 13, 2017	602	4.24
Hank and Wu may have figured out a way to stop Renard, while Nick is still on the run from Renard's manhunt. Elsewhere, Eve tries to figure out the cloth's mysteries. Adalind receives a phone call that puts her in the middle of everything, and Monroe and Rosalee have some babysitting adventures with Diana. Opening quote: "Man is not what he thinks he is, he is what he hides."
113	3	"Oh Captain, My Captain"	David Giuntoli	Thomas Ian Griffith	January 20, 2017	603	4.29
Nick pulls one last trick on Renard – to turn himself into Renard. The actual Renard finds out and must deal with the copycat. Meanwhile, the team makes sure that Nick's plan will come to fruition. After Nick, as Renard, publicly renounces becoming the city's mayor, the two finally fight on a roof and reach a deal. Opening quote: "You will face yourself again in a moment of terror..."
114	4	"El Cuegle"	Carlos Avila	Brenna Kouf	January 27, 2017	604	4.28
After being reinstated, Nick and Hank have to investigate the kidnapping of a baby boy. The kidnapper turns out to be a Wesen of the Cuegle type, that claims he has visions of the babies' futures, and only eats those who will grow up to do truly terrible things. Meanwhile, Renard keeps having discussions with his Meisner hallucination. Opening quote: "Foretold our fate; but, by the god's decree, all heard, and none believed the prophecy."
115	5	"The Seven Year Itch"	Lee Rose	Jeff Miller	February 3, 2017	605	4.08
A murder and the discovery of a body in a park lead Nick and Hank to an insect Wesen that emerges from the Earth every seven years for 24 hours. During that time, he has to capture a victim to drag underground to eat for the next seven years. Back in the loft, Adalind, thanks to Diana, finds an injured Eve in the tunnels, where she has painted the wooden shard's cloth symbols in the walls during a trance. Meanwhile, Monroe and Rosalee learn they're expecting triplets and Renard tries to discover if Meisner is a ghost or an hallucination. Opening quote: "When something itches my dear sir, the natural tendency is to scratch."
116	6	"Breakfast in Bed"	Julie Herlocker	Kyle McVey	February 10, 2017	606	4.00
A violent murder puts Nick and Hank on the tail of an alp, a Wesen that eats dreams and seems to be using a cheap hotel as hunting ground. Meanwhile, Eve, Monroe and Rosalee try to decipher the symbols on the cloth that covered the wooden shard, discovering it is an astronomical map that points to a future date. Meisner's ghost warns Renard of an ambush by the Black Claw and Renard dispatches them. Opening quote: "Sleep is good, death is better; but of course, the best thing would be to have never been born at all."
117	7	"Blind Love"	Aaron Lipstadt	Sean Calder	February 17, 2017	607	3.92
Rosalee surprises Monroe with a getaway for his birthday and invites most of the gang to join them. Things take a shocking turn when a hotel employee targets Nick in an effort to avenge his father, who Nick imprisoned. Using a spell he makes them randomly fall in love with each other so they will fight each other to death. Meanwhile, Eve gets a visit from a dark force that she has seen before. Elsewhere, Capt. Renard spends the weekend with Diana when a former ally, Lt. Grossante, decides to get even by kidnapping her, unaware of her powers. Opening quote: "Love looks not with the eyes but with the mind, and therefore is winged Cupid painted blind."
118	8	"The Son Also Rises"	Peter Werner	Todd Milliner & Nick Peet	February 24, 2017	608	4.01
Eve decides to stay at the Spice Shop, but she's once again attacked from the other side of a mirror and Monroe and Rosalee find her unconscious in the morning. While Nick sits at her bedside at the hospital, Hank and Wu investigate the killings of several scientists that leads them to uncover a Frankenstein-type experiment involving Wesen body parts to revive a scientist's son. Renard tries to decipher the tunnel symbols that Diana drew and his contact tells him part of it is some kind of prophecy. Opening quote: "No man chooses evil because it is evil; he only mistakes it for happiness."
119	9	"Tree People"	Jim Kouf	Brenna Kouf	March 3, 2017	609	4.23
After learning about Eve and Nick's experiences with the mirror, the group decides to use a buddy system when looking into a mirror to prevent anyone from being taken. Nick, Hank and Wu investigate the case of a poacher who claims his friend was killed by a tree-like monster, and they soon find more unexplained disappearances in the same forest. When they find a tree with human faces, they deduce it's the joint work of two creatures, a kenoshimobi and a yuboko. Opening quote: "In the morning, glad I see my foe outstretched beneath the tree."
120	10	"Blood Magic"	Janice Cooke	Thomas Ian Griffith	March 10, 2017	610	3.95
Monroe and Rosalee tape off all the mirrors. Eve asks Adalind for help and she lends Eve her mother's magic books. Nick, Hank and Wu investigate a series of murders, one of which in a local nursing home, which leads Monroe and Rosalee to inform them about euthanasia practiced for Wesen with dementia, who would Woge uncontrollably. Renard's contact tells Renard the prophecy says something is coming and Renard decides to ask Nick about the symbols in the passageway. Opening quote: "Nothing, they say is more certain than death, and nothing more uncertain than the time of dying."
121	11	"Where the Wild Things Were"	Terrence O'Hara	Brenna Kouf	March 17, 2017	611	3.96
Eve finds a spell to walk through the mirror. Nick follows her using the stick and they end up in a strange land resembling the Schwarzwald (Black Forest), where Wesen and primitive humans fight and cannibalize each other. Meanwhile, the others decide to show Renard the tunnel and the stick in the hopes his friend could help them. Renard's friend tells them of a prophecy that speaks of the coming of the Devil, that will take a "shaphat" (child bride), and she believes Diana is the Shaphat. At the other side, Nick and Eve identify their enemy as the Zerstörer. Opening quote: "Hell is empty, and all the devils are here."
122	12	"Zerstörer Shrugged"	Aaron Lipstadt	Story by : David Greenwalt & Jim Kouf; Teleplay by : Brenna Kouf	March 24, 2017	612	4.14
Nick and Eve unsuccessfully confront the Zerstörer ("Destroyer" in German) in his dimension, while their friends discover the Zerstörer needs a Grimm to cross the portal today, the day of the prophecy. Diana opens the portal, bringing Nick and a now-human Eve back. The Zerstörer has also crossed, and is leaving a bloody trail in his wake. Diana hides with Kelly in the cabin in the woods from "Pilot" under Adalind and Renard's protection. Meanwhile, Monroe, Rosalee, and Eve deduce the stick is actually a long-hidden shard of wood from Zerstörer's staff, that might have belonged to many historical figures in the past. Trubel arrives, having finished dismantling the criminal Wesen organization Black Claw. When the Zerstörer attacks the precinct, Wu and Hank are fatally injured, and Nick is overpowered. Opening quote: "You shall break them with a rod."
123	13	"The End"	David Greenwalt	Jim Kouf & David Greenwalt	March 31, 2017	613	4.33
With Hank and Wu dead, Zerstörer decides to hit the Spice Shop and Eve is fatally injured. Having killed everyone, Zerstörer explains to Nick he can revive them all if he gives him the stick. With the help of Trubel, Aunt Marie and Kelly, they kill Zerstörer, making the staff Nick's, the stick gets sucked towards the staff, making it whole again. However, a portal to "The Other Place" appears as Nick tries to revive Adalind with his new-found power and pulls Nick in. He appears back in Monroe and Rosalee's house, where he discovers it was all a test to discover if he was worthy of the staff. Twenty years later, Kelly and Diana are continuing the Grimm legacy, fighting alongside Nick and Adalind as well as Monroe and Rosalee's triplets. Opening quote: "Thy rod and thy staff they comfort me."

== Ratings ==
Time slot for Grimm in Season 6 was Fridays at 8:00 P.M. (EST).

Viewership and ratings per episode of Grimm season 6
No.	Title	Air date	Rating/share (18–49)	Viewers (millions)	DVR (18–49)	DVR viewers (millions)	Total (18–49)	Total viewers (millions)
1	"Fugitive"	January 6, 2017	0.9/4	4.49	0.5	—N/a	1.4	—N/a
2	"Trust Me Knot"	January 13, 2017	0.8/3	4.24	0.7	2.04	1.5	6.29
3	"Oh Captain, My Captain"	January 20, 2017	0.8/3	4.29	0.6	1.92	1.4	6.21
4	"El Cuegle"	January 27, 2017	0.8/3	4.28	0.7	2.01	1.5	6.29
5	"The Seven Year Itch"	February 3, 2017	0.8/3	4.08	0.7	2.12	1.5	6.27
6	"Breakfast in Bed"	February 10, 2017	0.7/3	4.00	0.7	—N/a	1.4	—N/a
7	"Blind Love"	February 17, 2017	0.8/3	3.92	0.6	—N/a	1.4	—N/a
8	"The Son Also Rises"	February 24, 2017	0.8/3	4.01	0.7	2.09	1.5	6.09
9	"Tree People"	March 3, 2017	0.8/3	4.23	TBD	TBD	TBD	TBD
10	"Blood Magic"	March 10, 2017	0.7/3	3.95	0.6	1.83	1.3	5.80
11	"Where the Wild Things Were"	March 17, 2017	0.8/3	3.96	0.6	1.89	1.4	5.86
12	"Zerstörer Shrugged"	March 24, 2017	0.8/3	4.14	0.6	TBD	1.4	TBD
13	"The End"	March 31, 2017	0.9/4	4.33	TBD	TBD	TBD	TBD
