= The Taming of the Wu =

- Grimm episode
- Episode no.: Season 5 Episode 19
- Directed by: Terrence O'Hara
- Written by: Brenna Kouf
- Production code: 519
- Original air date: April 29, 2016
- Running time: 43 minutes

Guest appearance
- Dan Crisafulli as Theo Delano

Episode chronology
← Previous "Good to the Bone"	Next → "Bad Night"
- Grimm season 5

"The Taming of the Wu" is the 19th episode of the 5th season of the supernatural drama television series Grimm, and the 107th episode overall.

== Plot ==
Opening Quote: "Nothing is so painful to the human mind as a great and sudden change."

Adalind (Claire Coffee) is reunited with Diana (Hannah R. Loyd) in an industrial building while Renard (Sasha Roiz) watches with bodyguards in the background.

Wu (Reggie Lee) is being examined in a hospital room when Nick (David Giuntoli) and Hank (Russell Hornsby) walk in. The doctor tells them that Wu has a concussion and needs to stay for a couple more tests. After she leaves Hank asks Wu what he remembers and Wu says he remembers staking out Monroe then waking up in the hospital. Nick and Hank tell him to get some rest then leave. In the corridor outside they discuss how they are worried about Wu and decide to keep an eye on him. A strange man walks up to Wu's door and looks through, then makes a call to tell someone that he's found Wu and that Wu is in the hospital.

Meisner (Damien Puckler) enters a house at night and finds two dead bodies inside along with a Black Claw symbol on the wall. As he's leaving a man enters, Meisner asks where "she" is and when the man doesn't tell him the two of them fight. Meisner is knocked to the floor but Trubel (Jacqueline Toboni) shows up and saves him. Then Meisner picks up a photo of Diana from the floor.

Back in the old industrial building Diana asks Adalind if she's going with her, but when Renard tell her that Adalind has a few things to do first her eyes glow purple and the walls begin to shake. Renard manages to calm her down and the two of them go, leaving a scared looking Adalind behind.

Hank and Zuri (Sharon Leal) are having a romantic night together and washing up after a meal before they kiss.

Sean tucks Diana into bed before going downstairs where he meets Conrad Bonaparte (Shaun Toub). Bonaparte tells Renard that Adalind must join them otherwise she will have to be killed, and that Renard should convince Nick to join them as well.

In Nick's loft Adalind is woken up by a vision of Diana asking where she is. Adalind gets up and finds Nick trying to stop Kelly from crying. Adalind puts Kelly to sleep then tells Nick that she's a hexenbiest again.

It cuts back to Wu in the hospital where he's having a bad dream about when he was attacked. He transforms and the nurse attending to him screams and runs out the room.

Hank and Zuri are in bed together, they talk about Nick and Zuri asks to meet him before Hank gets up to make breakfast.

Back in the hospital Wu is told that his blood has an anomaly in but he seems to be stable so he can go home, Nick and Hank offer to take him. When they reach Wu's apartment Wu tells them about the weird dreams he's been having and Nick tells him to call Rosalee (Bree Turner) if they don't stop.

Adalind hears Diana's voice asking where she is, then doubles over in pain. Eve/Juliette (Bitsie Tulloch) is also in pain when Diana's voice says "You're not my Mommy" and her mirror cracks in the shape of a skull. Trubel and Meisner return and tell Eve that Black Claw has taken Diana and are using her to get to Adalind, Eve then tells them about feeling how powerful Diana is.

Wu cuts his hand opening a jar and sees his arm transform. He calls Rosalee at the spice shop and she says that she'll wait for him there.

Bonaparte shows up at Adalind's workplace and tells her she needs to decide whether to go with Diana or stay with Nick by the end of the day.

As Wu is heading to the spice shop the strange man from earlier is following him. Wu waits for him and reveals that he knows the strange man and his name is Theo Delano. Theo then attacks him.

Nick, Hank, Eve, Meisner, and Trubel are all talking at HW. They tell Nick and Hank that Black Claw has Diana and they are using her to get to Adalind and that Adalind might leave and take Kelly with her. Nick and Hank leave for a crime scene.

At the scene it is revealed that the dead man is Theo Delano and that Wu never showed up to meet with Monroe (Silas Weir Mitchell) and Rosalee. Nick and Hank go to Wu's apartment and find him covered in blood on his bed. Wu wakes up and can't remember what happened at first, he then remembers that he went to confront Theo Delano and that Theo attacked him. Nick tells him Theo is dead and they all go back to the crime scene. They investigate the truck Theo had been in and find a piece of paper with Wu's address on. Nick takes Wu to the spice shop while Hank gets a call from Zuri, who is then revealed to be working with Black Claw. At the spice shop Rosalee makes a drink that will help Wu remember what happened after Theo attacked him, and as he is recounting what happened he transforms again. Rosalee figures out that it might have been caused by the scratch he received when fighting the lycanthrope in a previous episode and that because he's not wesen it's affecting him differently. Wu wakes up and Rosalee explains this to him and that it's triggered by a fight or flight response and that he needs to try and stay calm while they look into it.

Trubel calls and tells them that Theo worked for Black Claw. While she's calling Nick, Eve walks in and says she needs to speak to him. Eve tells him that something's happening with Adalind and they need to go find her straight away. Nick returns to the loft and finds a note from Adalind saying that she's gone, and that she loves him.

== Reception ==
=== Viewers ===
3.76 million people watched this episode, and received a 0.8/3 share in the 18-49 range which was slightly down from the previous week.

=== Critical reviews ===
Les Chappell of The A.V. Club said "This is a lot more than Reggie Lee’s ever been asked to do as part of the Grimm ensemble, and he rises to the challenge of being more than just comic relief admirably." He gave the show a B rating.

Kathleen Wiedel of TV Fanatic gives a good review stating that she enjoyed the dialogue in this episode between Nick, Hank, and Wu and that "There's a lot to like about Grimm Season 5 Episode 19, which served as a day in the limelight for many Grimmsters' favorite character, the eternally snarky Sgt. Drew Wu."
