= Oh Captain, My Captain (Grimm) =

- Grimm episode
- Episode no.: Season 6 Episode 3
- Directed by: David Giuntoli
- Written by: Thomas Ian Griffith
- Cinematography by: Ross Berryman
- Editing by: Scott Boyd
- Production code: 603
- Original air date: January 20, 2017
- Running time: 42 minutes

Guest appearances
- Chris L. McKenna as Lt. Grossante; Hannah R. Loyd as Diana Schade-Renard; M. Ben Newman as Jeremiah Rogers; Robert Blanche as Sgt. Franco; Damien Puckler as Martin Meisner

Episode chronology
← Previous "Trust Me Knot"	Next → "El Cuegle"
- Grimm season 6

"Oh Captain, My Captain" is the third episode of season 6 of the supernatural drama television series Grimm and the 113th episode overall, which premiered on January 20, 2017, on the cable network NBC. The episode was written by Thomas Ian Griffith and was directed by series regular David Giuntoli, making his directional debut. In the episode, Nick decides that in order to stop Renard, he needs to become him to finally destroy what he was looking for.

The episode received positive reviews from critics, who praised Giuntoli's direction and the character development.

== Plot ==
Opening quote: "You will face yourself again in a moment of terror..."

Nick (David Giuntoli), Hank (Russell Hornsby), Monroe (Silas Weir Mitchell), Eve (Bitsie Tulloch), Wu (Reggie Lee) and Rosalee (Bree Turner) discuss their next move against Renard (Sasha Roiz), who is also demanding Hank's and Wu's resignations. The next day, Hank and Wu present their resignation letters to Renard, although Wu nearly loses control of his form. Nick decides to stop Renard from his inauguration as mayor by asking Eve to get him the witch's hat so he can transform into Renard.

Renard is visited by Jeremiah (M. Ben Newman), who is angry after discovering that he had an affair with Rachel and is also a suspect in her murder and gives him 24 hours to give him money to not reveal the information. Renard then has a Löwen, Lt. Grossante (Chris McKenna), kill Jeremiah but the killing reminds him of him murdering Meisner (Damien Puckler). Renard then has Grossante promoted as captain. Adalind (Claire Coffee) retrieves hair from Renard's clothes and gives it to Monroe, who barely escapes the house when Renard arrives early. In the spice shop, Nick begins to inhale from the potion and after a painful progress, he becomes Renard.

Adalind distracts Renard from attending his inauguration speech and Renard watches as Nick impersonating him, announces his resignation from the mayor office and states that Nick was part of an undercover investigation to bring "the real killer" to justice, planning to resume his career as police captain. After the speech, Nick (still as Renard) and Hank arrive at the precinct to retrieve items from him. Nick is confronted by Grossante, who is angry that he broke his deal and he will pay for it. The real Renard arrives and briefly confronts Nick before he leaves. Renard then arranges a meeting with Nick on his loft.

The gang is confused as to why Nick is still Renard and find that due to his Grimm powers, he may be Renard forever. Adalind arrives with Diana (Hannah R. Lloyd) and Kelly and works on another potion to reverse the shift. Nick and Renard fight in the roof but as they have the same powers, neither can beat the other. Nick proposes to frame Bonaparte for the attack in the North station and that his involvement was the cause of his resignation. Renard accepts and gives Nick, Hank and Wu their old jobs. He also adds that he will raise Diana and threatens that something will happen if he dies and if he finds another shiftier like him, the deal will end. Nick returns to the spice shop but finds that no potion has been discovered. Diana arrives and after seeing that he isn't her dad, she uses her powers to push him away, making him go back to his normal body. Renard returns to his house and discovers someone sitting on the couch, waiting for him. He stares in shock when he finds Meisner (Damien Puckler) there, telling him that "he chose the wrong side".

== Production ==
=== Development ===
In July 2016, it was announced that the third episode of the season would be called "Oh Captain, My Captain" and was to be written by Thomas Ian Griffith and directed by series regular David Giuntoli. The episode marks David Giuntoli's directional debut in the series. The episode was the first episode of the season to be filmed but it was the third to be released so as to give time for Giuntoli to prepare. As Giuntoli was directing the episode, he didn't appear in most of the episode but his character appeared throughout a personification. He commented that "Everybody was nervous about me directing because I'm a goofball on the set and don't have a long attention span. But I was ready. I did a ton of homework. I didn't want to let anybody down. It was the best time I've ever had professionally — without doubt and without exception. If you had put me in an MRI machine, you would have seen my entire brain light up!" On the last day of shooting, the cast and crew threw a party for Giuntoli, giving him also a clapper board with his name written on it.

== Reception ==
=== Viewers ===
The episode was viewed by 4.29 million people, earning a 0.8/3 in the 18-49 rating demographics on the Nielson ratings scale, ranking second on its timeslot and fourth for the night in the 18-49 demographics, behind 20/20, a rerun of Shark Tank, Dr. Ken, Hawaii Five-0, Blue Bloods, and Last Man Standing. This was a massive slight increase in viewership from the previous episode, which was watched by 4.24 million viewers with a 0.8/3. This means that 0.8 percent of all households with televisions watched the episode, while 3 percent of all households watching television at that time watched it. With DVR factoring in, the finale was watched by 6.21 million viewers and had a 1.4 ratings share in the 18-49 demographics.

=== Critical reviews ===
"Oh Captain, My Captain" received enormous praise. Les Chappell from The A.V. Club gave the episode a "A" rating and wrote, "'Oh Captain, My Captain' is an episode that clears up the vast majority of those concerns, because all of that's present. It's easily the best episode of season six and a contender for one of the show's top ten, finding a way to both get our characters out of the hole they're in and break up the bleakness with some body-swap levity. It's an encouraging step for the show's final act, one that proves even after 112 episodes it still has a way to surprise us."

Kathleen Wiedel from TV Fanatic, gave a 4.4 star rating out of 5, stating: "Oh, the sweet taste of revenge. Nick finally got some long-delayed payback, and Renard got no less than he deserved in Grimm Season 6 Episode 3. Dear me, but revenge is a dish best served cold. And boy was it satisfying to see Renard's schemes brought to nothing by one brief impersonation!"

Lindi Smith from EW gave the episode an "A" rating and wrote, "Okay, I cannot emphasize enough how much pure enjoyment 'Oh Captain, My Captain' provides. Not only did it move the plot along — Nick's no longer a fugitive, the action can refocus on police matters, Adalind's free of Renard's clutches — but it offered some pitch-perfect light moments, too. Let's hope this momentum continues as the show returns to its monster-of-the-week roots."

TV.com, wrote, "Overall, 'My Captain' wasn't a romp or a huge comedy episode. But it seemed a tad more light-hearted than the last two weeks. Not as much as, say, 'The Grimm Who Stole Christmas.' And even with Jeremiah Rogers getting brutally murdered. So long, M. Ben Rogers! But there were some elements of farce going on. The bit with Monroe panicking and hiding in Renard's closet, and Adalind's over-the-top attempts to keep Renard there, seemed a bit like a French bedroom farce."

Christine Horton of Den of Geek wrote, "Who doesn't love a bit of body swap fun and games? Presumably that's what the writers were thinking when they penned Captain, My Captain, where they neatly find a way to get Nick out of the corner they have painted him into."
