= The Seven Year Itch (Grimm) =

- Grimm episode
- Episode no.: Season 6 Episode 5
- Directed by: Lee Rose
- Written by: Jeff Miller
- Cinematography by: Ross Berryman
- Editing by: Scott Boyd
- Production code: 605
- Original air date: February 3, 2017
- Running time: 42 minutes

Guest appearances
- Damien Puckler as Martin Meisner; Ben Lawson as William Stillman; Brad Greenquist as Steiger; Will Blagrove as Donald Simpson; Hannah R. Loyd as Diana Schade-Renard

Episode chronology
← Previous "El Cuegle"	Next → "Breakfast in Bed"
- Grimm season 6

"The Seven Year Itch" is the fifth episode of season 6 of the supernatural drama television series Grimm and the 115th episode overall, which premiered on February 3, 2017, on the cable network NBC. The episode was written by Jeff Miller and was directed by Lee Rose. In the episode, Nick and Hank investigate a murder, revealed to be a Wesen that appears every seven years to capture a victim for seven more years. Meanwhile, Monroe and Rosalee receive news about their baby while Renard continues to be haunted by Meisner's ghost.

The episode received mixed reviews from critics, who criticized the case of the week and the direction the show is taking towards its finale.

== Plot ==
A murder and the discovery of a body in a park lead Nick (David Giuntoli) and Hank (Russell Hornsby) to an insect Wesen that emerges from the Earth every seven years for 24 hours. During that time, he has to capture a victim to drag underground to eat for the next seven years. Back in the loft, Adalind (Claire Coffee), thanks to Diana (Hannah R. Lloyd), finds an injured Eve (Bitsie Tulloch) in the tunnels, where she has painted the wooden shard's cloth symbols in the walls during a trance. She also apologizes for how Adalind hurt Juliette. Meanwhile, Monroe (Silas Weir Mitchell) and Rosalee (Bree Turner) learn they're expecting triplets and Renard (Sasha Roiz) tries to discover if Meisner (Damien Puckler) is a ghost or an hallucination.

== Reception ==
=== Viewers ===
The episode was viewed by 4.08 million people, earning a 0.8/3 in the 18-49 rating demographics on the Nielson ratings scale, ranking third on its timeslot and eighth for the night in the 18-49 demographics, behind Dr. Ken, 20/20, MacGyver, Hawaii Five-0, Blue Bloods, Last Man Standing, and Shark Tank. This was a 5% decrease in viewership from the previous episode, which was watched by 4.28 million viewers with a 0.8/3. This means that 0.8 percent of all households with televisions watched the episode, while 3 percent of all households watching television at that time watched it. With DVR factoring in, the episode was watched by 6.27 million viewers and had a 1.5 ratings share in the 18-49 demographics.

=== Critical reviews ===
"The Seven Year Itch" received mixed reviews. Les Chappell from The A.V. Club gave the episode a "C+" rating and wrote, "And then an episode like 'The Seven Year Itch' decides to end a dramatic fight scene with a hippopotamus wesen biting the head off a cicada wesen. It's one of the goofiest and most anticlimactic moments I've ever seen on the series, one that definitely works in the moment for absurdity and shock value but one that doesn't make for a satisfying close to the story. If nothing else though, it at least fits into the whole of 'The Seven Year Itch,' an episode that has some intermittently interesting moments but for the most part misses the mark on what it's trying to achieve."

Kathleen Wiedel from TV Fanatic, gave a 3 star rating out of 5, stating: "It's probably fair to say that there is a significant portion of the fan base that finds Wesen-of-the-Week stories... well, boring. Especially when thrown up against exciting and dramatic long-term arcs. Alas, Grimm Season 6 Episode 5 does little to discourage the sentiment. With the series rapidly drawing to a close, is it really the best use of time to have our beloved Team Grimm go after Cicada Guy?"

Sara Netzley from EW gave the episode a "B−" rating and wrote, "Eh, the stretch of top-notch Grimm episodes had to come to an end at some point, right? At least tonight's monster-of-the-week entry was saved from out-and-out meh-ness by the killer (literally!) last 10 minutes."

TV.com, wrote, "The best that can be said is that it really doesn't seem like a 'final chapter' episode. Neither did last week's. Neither does next week's 'Breakfast in Bed.' It seems like the kind of padding you'd get in a 22-season episode, like we've got over and over again in seasons 1 through 5. It wasn't a horrendous episode, but it was bottom of the barrel by Grimm standards. And a joke by 'final chapter' standards."

Christine Horton of Den of Geek wrote, "As much as this episode doesn't do much to progress many of the recent storylines, it delivers what fans generally like about the show: the hunting of malevolent mythical creatures, acerbic one-liners and a little Monrosalee-shaped fluff."
