= El Cuegle =

- Grimm episode
- Episode no.: Season 6 Episode 4
- Directed by: Carlos Avila
- Written by: Brenna Kouf
- Cinematography by: Ross Berryman
- Editing by: Scott Boyd
- Production code: 604
- Original air date: January 27, 2017
- Running time: 42 minutes

Guest appearances
- Damien Puckler as Martin Meisner; Carlos Sanz as Isidoro Malpica (El Cuegle); Ellen Wroe as Haley Maler; Jeff Branson as Paul Maler; Hannah R. Loyd as Diana Schade-Renard

Episode chronology
← Previous "Oh Captain, My Captain"	Next → "The Seven Year Itch"
- Grimm season 6

"El Cuegle" is the fourth episode of season 6 of the supernatural drama television series Grimm and the 114th episode overall, which premiered on January 27, 2017, on the cable network NBC. The episode was written by Brenna Kouf and was directed by Carlos Avila. In the episode, Nick and Hank investigate the kidnapping of a baby that happened because of a creature named Cuegle. Meanwhile, Rosalee and Monroe discover something about the baby while Renard is haunted by Meisner's hallucinations.

The episode received positive reviews from critics, who praised the Renard storyline and the case of the week.

== Plot ==
Opening quote: "Foretold our fate; but, by the god's decree, all heard, and none believed the prophecy."

Renard (Sasha Roiz) is shocked to find Meisner (Damien Puckler) in his house and touches him in order to find if he's real. He's called by Grossante (Chris McKenna), who's angry for the incident at the conference. When he hangs up, he finds Meisner gone. Back in the spice shop, Adalind (Claire Coffee) tells Diana (Hannah R. Lloyd) that they will move with Nick (David Giuntoli) for a while. Diana then checks on Rosalee (Bree Turner) and discovers that she's pregnant with more than one baby.

Nick and Adalind return to loft and Adalind tells him they need to keep Diana safe because her powers are still unknown. Nick tells Adalind that he was going crazy without her, not knowing Juliette was eavesdropping in the tunnels and overhears them. Juliette nearly wogues but then remembers the place where Nick had hidden the magic stick. She puts it back but now sees her hand is marked by one of the symbols she saw during her death grip.

After being reinstated, and watching the Captain fight his own imagination of Meisner's ghost in his office, Nick and Hank (Russell Hornsby), investigate the kidnapping of a baby boy, the mother describes monster as taking their baby. Juliette finds the magic stick but it repels her and she has flashbacks of the night when Nick used the stick to heal her.

Nick, Rosalee and Monroe discover the Wesen responsible for kidnapping the child, it turns out to be a Cuegle type. It claims he has visions of the babies' futures, and only eats those who will grow up to do truly terrible things. The Cuegle is eventually shot after he escapes from the precinct and tries to kidnap the baby again, saying he saw the boy kill his parents in the future. Rosalee and Monroe discuss the possibility of leaving Portland to raise their babies due to the fact that it hasn't been the safest place for them.

Renard spends time with Diana asking how Bonaparte was killed, she tells him that he killed Bonaparte. Renard ask Diana what she would do if Nick ever hurt Adalind and Diana replied saying Nick would be very sorry.

== Reception ==
=== Viewers ===
The episode was viewed by 4.28 million people, earning a 0.8/3 in the 18-49 rating demographics on the Nielson ratings scale, ranking second on its timeslot and ninth for the night in the 18-49 demographics, behind a rerun of Blue Bloods, a rerun of Hawaii Five-0, 20/20, Dr. Ken, a rerun of Shark Tank, Dateline NBC, Last Man Standing, and Shark Tank. This was a slight decrease in viewership from the previous episode, which was watched by 4.29 million viewers with a 0.8/3. This means that 0.8 percent of all households with televisions watched the episode, while 3 percent of all households watching television at that time watched it. With DVR factoring in, the finale was watched by 6.29 million viewers and had a 1.5 ratings share in the 18-49 demographics.

=== Critical reviews ===
"El Cuegle" received positive reviews. Les Chappell from The A.V. Club gave the episode an "A−" rating and wrote, "For that reason, 'El Cuegle' is exactly the episode we needed at this juncture. It's a monster-of-the-week episode, but it's also one of the best monster-of-the-week episodes that Grimm's had in recent memory, a reminder of the virtues of the format. And while it brushes over some of the recent developments to get us where we need to be, it also doesn't forget the more important developments and retains the feeling that we're still heading to some form of conclusion."

Kathleen Wiedel from TV Fanatic, gave a 4 star rating out of 5, stating: "As monster of the week stories go, this one was actually rather interesting to me and evoked some potentially intriguing philosophical questions. Though it almost certainly would have been better if someone actually asked the questions."

Sara Netzley from EW gave the episode an "A" rating and wrote, "Was this not one of the best stand-alone monsters Grimm has ever showcased? The 'We won... didn't we?' vibe felt like a classic X-Files episode — which is the highest compliment you can pay a television show. It's sophisticated storytelling and continues a streak of knockout episodes in Grimm's final season."

TV.com, wrote, "So 'El Cuegle' was pretty much the same basic Grimm episode that we know and love. Or at least the writers think we do, because they keep dragging it out. It feels like we've seen it about 167 times. And it keeps getting funnier every time we see it! Sorry, Beetlejuice moment."

Christine Horton of Den of Geek wrote, "From its preview, next week's episode appears to be more of the same. This inevitability leads to the question of how the writers are pacing this shorter final season. Perhaps they think it would be too much to keep for viewers to keep the action ramped up across the 13 episodes? Black Claw is still a threat so there's plenty left to fight for. Or maybe this is the calm before the storm? Let's hope so."
