= The Son Also Rises (Grimm) =

- Grimm episode
- Episode no.: Season 6 Episode 8
- Directed by: Peter Werner
- Written by: Todd Milliner; Nick Peet
- Cinematography by: Eliot Rockett
- Editing by: George Pilkinton
- Production code: 608
- Original air date: February 24, 2017
- Running time: 42 minutes

Guest appearances
- Geoffrey Blake as Victor Shelley; George Newbern as Julian Levy; Vik Sahay as Sanji Raju; Alla Korot as Dasha Karpushin

Episode chronology
← Previous "Blind Love"	Next → "Tree People"
- Grimm season 6

"The Son Also Rises" is the eighth episode of season 6 of the supernatural drama television series Grimm and the 118th episode overall, which premiered on February 24, 2017, on the cable network NBC. The episode was written by Todd Milliner and Nick Peet and was directed by Peter Werner. In the episode, Eve is attacked from the other side of the mirror and Nick decides to stay with her. Meanwhile, Hank and Wu investigate the murders of scientists, discovering that the murders are related to an experiment to resurrect a man's son.

The episode received positive reviews from critics, who praised the character development but some criticized it for not advancing enough story, which has been another point of criticism for the last episodes.

== Plot ==
Eve (Bitsie Tulloch) decides to stay at the spice shop, but she's once again attacked from the other side of a mirror, and Monroe (Silas Weir Mitchell) and Rosalee (Bree Turner) find her unconscious in the morning. While Nick (David Giuntoli) sits at her bedside in the hospital, Hank (Russell Hornsby) and Wu (Reggie Lee) investigate the killings of several scientists, that leads them to uncover a Frankenstein-type experiment involving Wesen body parts to revive a scientist's son. Meanwhile, Renard (Sasha Roiz) tries to decipher the tunnel symbols that Diana drew, and his contact tells him part of it is some kind of prophecy.

== Reception ==
=== Viewers ===
The episode was viewed by 4.01 million people, earning a 0.8/3 in the 18-49 rating demographics on the Nielson ratings scale, ranking third on its timeslot and ninth for the night in the 18-49 demographics, behind Dateline NBC, a rerun of Blue Bloods, Dr. Ken, 20/20, MacGyver, Hawaii Five-0, Last Man Standing, and Shark Tank. This was a 3% decrease in viewership from the previous episode, which was watched by 3.92 million viewers with a 0.8/3. This means that 0.8 percent of all households with televisions watched the episode, while 3 percent of all households watching television at that time watched it. With DVR factoring in, the episode was watched by 6.09 million viewers and had a 1.5 ratings share in the 18-49 demographics.

=== Critical reviews ===
"The Son Also Rises" received positive reviews. Les Chappell from The A.V. Club wrote, "Grimm's checked off a lot of the major myths in five-plus years, but there a few of the big ones that it's steered away from, either due to overuse in other adaptations or difficulty fitting to it into this universe. But if 'The Son Also Rises' is any indication, it's possible there's a third option, and they're saving the best for last. The show tackles the Frankenstein myth and does a bang-up job of doing so, embracing both the terror and the loneliness that exists within it. They may as well bring on Dracula at this point. (No, not that one.)"

Kathleen Wiedel from TV Fanatic, gave a 2 star rating out of 5, stating: "I confess: I had a really, really hard time deciding what grade to give Grimm Season 6 Episode 8 because I was just too busy laughing my head off. It was just so difficult to take 'The Son Also Rises' with any amount of seriousness, particularly as a person with a degree in English and a modicum of scientific understanding."

Sara Netzley from EW gave the episode a "B−" rating and wrote, "Overall, it was a clever twist on the Frankenstein story to give Wesen limbs to an unsuspecting human, even if that aspect may have felt a little glossed over as the police struggled to unravel a mystery that most of the audience had already figured out. Still, it's yet another example of Grimm putting its own spin on a familiar tale, which it's done so effectively for six seasons."

TV.com, wrote, "Overall, 'The Son Also Rises' was another one of those episodes where the creative team gets it into their heads to start doing a riff on some classic sci-fi/horror trope and goes for it. There are a few minor subplot elements, but absolutely nothing happens to move the story arc along in this episode. I suppose Renard gets brought in a little closer to the loop, but since he's a) playing catchup with what we the viewers know the other characters, and b) there isn't that much to know, it's kind of a lot of work for a pretty minimal payoff. Soon Renard will be only slightly less ignorant than he is now, and still not know anything. Umm, yay?"

Christine Horton of Den of Geek wrote, "The show finishes with Eve prophecising on what life-changing event the symbols could be predicting, stating: 'We don't have a lot of time left before it gets here.' No, you don't! The show's finale is in a month's time, people. Can we please forget about the weekly Wesen storylines and start focusing on the big stuff now?"
