= Blind Love =

Blind Love may refer to:

== Films ==
- Blind Love (1912 film), an American drama film directed by D. W. Griffith
- Blind Love (2015 film), a documentary film
- Blind Love (2016 film), a Pakistani romance film

== Music ==
- Blind Love (album), by Ratcat, 1991
- "Blind Love" (song), by CNBLUE, 2013
- "Blind Love", a song by GreatGuys from We're Not Alone Final: Only You, 2022
- "Blind Love", a song by Tom Waits from Rain Dogs, 1985
- The Blind Love, a British band co-founded by Christian Burns

== Other uses ==
- "Blind Love" (Grimm), a TV episode
- Blind Love (novel), an unfinished novel by Wilkie Collins

== See also ==
- Blind Loves, a 2008 Slovak film
