= Blood Magic =

- Grimm episode
- Episode no.: Season 6 Episode 10
- Directed by: Janice Cooke
- Written by: Thomas Ian Griffith
- Cinematography by: Eliot Rockett
- Editing by: Kevin Soares
- Production code: 610
- Original air date: March 10, 2017
- Running time: 42 minutes

Guest appearances
- Rob Brownstein as Dr. Landeaux; Nancy Linehan Charles as Elizabeth Stanton; Frank Birney as Norm Stanton; Regi Davis as Mason Wilcox

Episode chronology
← Previous "Tree People"	Next → "Where the Wild Things Were"
- Grimm season 6

"Blood Magic" is the tenth episode of season 6 of the supernatural drama television series Grimm and the 120th episode overall, which premiered on March 10, 2017, on NBC. The episode was written by Thomas Ian Griffith and was directed by Janice Cooke. In the episode, Nick and Hank investigate severe attacks in a nursing home and discover that there's euthanasia being performed in the Wesen community. Meanwhile, the group begins to discover more about the prophecy behind the symbols.

The episode received positive reviews from critics, who praised the character development but some criticized it for its pace just like the previous episodes.

== Plot ==
After a series of random brutal attacks and an apparently unrelated assault on a 91-year-old woman in a local nursing home committed by an orderly, Nick (David Giuntoli) and Hank (Russell Hornsby) learn about euthanasia being practiced in the Wesen community. Eve (Bitsie Tulloch) asks Adalind (Claire Coffee) questions that only a Hexenbiest can answer. Eve asks to read some of Adalind's mother's books to look for answers. Dasha talks about an ancient prophecy which predicts something coming. Renard (Sasha Roiz) decides to ask Nick about the mysterious symbols in the tunnels.

== Reception ==
=== Viewers ===
The episode was viewed by 3.95 million people, earning a 0.7/3 in the 18-49 rating demographics on the Nielson ratings scale, ranking third on its timeslot and ninth for the night in the 18-49 demographics, behind 20/20, Dr. Ken, a rerun of Shark Tank, Dateline NBC, Last Man Standing, MacGyver, Blue Bloods, and Hawaii Five-0. This was a 7% decrease in viewership from the previous episode, which was watched by 4.23 million viewers with a 0.8/3. This means that 0.7 percent of all households with televisions watched the episode, while 3 percent of all households watching television at that time watched it. With DVR factored in, the episode was watched by 5.80 million viewers and had a 1.3 rating in the 18-49 demographics.

=== Critical reviews ===
"Blood Magic" received positive reviews. Les Chappell from The A.V. Club wrote, "'Blood Magic' is another Grimm episode that towards the end gets to one of the things I've always liked about the show. For all the criticism that can be leveled at Grimm for its scattered approach to narratives and political organizations — are we ever going to mention Black Claw or the royal families again? — it's always been reliable in terms of creating a lived-in wesen community. It's a vibrant ecosystem with a lot of different species trying to exist in a society that doesn't acknowledge them."

Kathleen Wiedel from TV Fanatic, gave a 3.8 star rating out of 5, stating, "One could once again fault the series for introducing new world building with only a precious few episodes left, but Grimm Season 6 Episode 10 made up for it with a definite poignancy to the A-story."

Sara Netzley from EW gave the episode an "A−" rating and wrote, "In your wildest fairy tale fantasies, did you ever expect Grimm to feature a somber rumination on dementia, eldercare, and dying with dignity in its final season? I didn't, but I'm certainly glad it did — and in an episode where seemingly divergent plot threads tidily weave together in the end, to boot."

Christine Horton of Den of Geek wrote, "This week Grimm tackled the weighty subject of dementia and assisted suicide, but of course in a very Grimm-like manner. It was an interesting move, this late into the final season to offer up more insight into the Wesen world and its inhabitants, but it provided a genuinely emotional moment that is rare to experience on a show such as this."

== See also ==
- Hyaluronidase
- assassin bug
