= Where the Wild Things Were =

- Grimm episode
- Episode no.: Season 6 Episode 11
- Directed by: Terrence O'Hara
- Written by: Brenna Kouf
- Cinematography by: Ross Berryman
- Editing by: George Pilkinton
- Production code: 611
- Original air date: March 17, 2017
- Running time: 42 minutes

Guest appearances
- Torsten Voges as Leader; Alla Korot as Dasha Karpushin; Hannah R. Loyd as Diana Schade-Renard

Episode chronology
← Previous "Blood Magic"	Next → "Zerstörer Shrugged"
- Grimm season 6

"Where the Wild Things Were" is the 11th episode of season 6 of the supernatural drama television series Grimm and the 121st episode overall, which premiered on March 17, 2017, on the cable network NBC. The episode was written by Brenna Kouf and was directed by Terrence O'Hara. In the episode, Nick and Eve go inside the mirror to find the other place to be a resemblance to the Black Forest with some slight differences. Meanwhile, the group contacts Renard for help in discovering more about the symbols, discovering the prophecy behind it. The episode is the first of a two-parter with the next episode as the second part. The episode's name is a spoof of the popular children's book of the same name.

The episode received positive reviews from critics, who praised the Zerstörer storyline.

== Plot ==
Opening quote: "Hell is empty and all the devils are here."

Nick (David Giuntoli) arrives at the loft and talks with Adalind (Claire Coffee) about Renard's (Sasha Roiz) knowledge of Diana's (Hannah R. Loyd) danger (due to those symbols). Adalind finally admits that Diana is responsible for possessing Renard and killing Bonaparte and Rachel and they need to tell Renard about the carved symbol tunnel. Nick is wary of Renard, but Adalind assures he'd never harm Diana, and they need all the help they can get.

Monroe (Silas Weir Mitchell) and Rosalee (Bree Turner) return home and find the Hexenbiest book open, marks/blood on a new full-length mirror and Eve (Bitsie Tulloch) gone. They call Nick to help them find Eve, deducing she crossed the mirror and just then, the book magically locks itself and only Adalind can re-open it. Meanwhile, Eve wakes up in the other place which is a snowy land and discovers she is unable to return through the portal/mirror; as the image of home disappears, she discovers the same symbols carved on the standing-stone she passed through. She wanders around and sees a man being chased by three lionesque Wesen, who kill and devour the man, then kill some other chasing Wesen. Nick and Adalind arrive at Monroe's house with Diana. Adalind is the only one who can enter mirror using her magic, but Nick refuses to let her go and decides to use the stick as a way he might enter without her. Nick succeeds in opening the portal using the stick but the stick remains behind as "it doesn't belong there" (according to Diana).

Nick enters the mirror to find that the land resembles the Schwarzwald (Black Forest). He is attacked by a Blutbad who he kills with his gun. He finds Eve and they run from a group of Blutbaden. They finally reach a fort of humans, who eventually let them inside when they witness them killing some Wesen, but one of them flees. Nick and Eve show them the drawing of the skull creature, which the humans identity as "Zerstörer". The fleeing Blutbad is then confronted by Zerstörer. Meanwhile, Renard is called to help in finding out more about the symbols in the cloth. He contacts Dasha (Alla Korot), who explains that the real world and the other place are different dimensions and that the place could be the afterlife. She then talks privately with Renard to explain that Diana may be the "Shaphat", and Zerstörer could also be known as the Devil. There have been prophecies of the arrival of Zerstörer who is destined to make the Shaphat his bride and have a hundred children with her.

After leaving the humans, Nick and Eve return to the stone pillars where they entered and find the same symbols carved into the pillar and the sky. They inspect the pillars and find that they may be in Zerstörer's temple. The Blutbad returns and attacks Eve until Nick kills him. While discussing how to beat it, Zerstörer appears and uses his staff to attack Nick and Eve. Nick uses the remaining bullets he has on him, with no success. Zerstörer shows knowledge of Nick's Grimm powers and has his staff shine as Eve woges into her Hexenbiest form.

== Reception ==
=== Viewers ===
The episode was viewed by 3.96 million people, earning a 0.8/3 in the 18-49 rating demographics on the Nielson ratings scale, ranking third on its timeslot and sixth for the night in the 18-49 demographics, behind Dr. Ken, Dateline NBC, Last Man Standing, Truth and Lies: The Family Manson, and an NCAA Tournament. This was a slight increase in viewership from the previous episode, which was watched by 3.95 million viewers with a 0.7/3. This means that 0.7 percent of all households with televisions watched the episode, while 3 percent of all households watching television at that time watched it.

=== Critical reviews ===
"Where the Wild Things Were" received positive reviews. Les Chappell from The A.V. Club wrote, "While there's a lot of things I liked in 'Where The Wild Things Were,' I found myself unable to embrace it as much as I wanted to with only three episodes left in the series' run. Part of it is a natural consequence of being a two-parter, but a bigger part is that it introduces an entire new world that there's not enough time to explore."

Kathleen Wiedel from TV Fanatic, gave a 3.2 star rating out of 5, stating, "While this episode wasn't terrible, it really amounted to a whole lot of exposition that should've already happened and an encounter with a big bad that could've been reached in the first five minutes. Really, though, the worst disappointment about this episode was the fact that the 'To Be Continued' title card didn't have any snarky commentary, as well!"

Sara Netzley from EW gave the episode an "A−" rating and wrote, "When you step through a mirror into an unknown world, isn't it common courtesy to leave a note? Not if you’re Eve, apparently."

Christine Horton of Den of Geek wrote, "This is the first of a two-parter, and we're left with Nick and Eve in a face/skull-off with the Zerstörer, who seems immune to both of their powers. We can only hope that the final episodes will be based on fighting monsters, with a big action-packed finale against the devil's dark forces. (A return by Truble to the fold would be most welcome, too.)"
