= Big Feet =

- Grimm episode
- Episode no.: Season 1 Episode 21
- Directed by: Omar Madha
- Story by: Alan DiFiore; Dan E. Fesman
- Teleplay by: Richard Hatem
- Cinematography by: Eliot Rockett
- Editing by: George Pilkinton
- Production code: 121
- Original air date: May 11, 2012
- Running time: 42 minutes

Guest appearances
- Roger Bart as Konstantin Brinkerhoff; Kenneth Mitchell as Larry Mackenzie; Fulvio Cecere as Reynaldo

Episode chronology
← Previous "Happily Ever Aftermath"	Next → "Woman in Black"
- Grimm season 1

"Big Feet" is the 21st episode of the supernatural drama television series Grimm of season 1, which premiered on May 11, 2012, on NBC. The episode was written by Richard Hatem from a story by Alan DiFiore and Dan E. Fesman, and was directed by Omar Madha.

== Plot ==
Opening Quote: "He stripped off his skin and tossed it into the fire and he was in human form again."

A group of cryptozoologists investigating reports of a sighting of Bigfoot is attacked by a creature and killed violently. Juliette (Bitsie Tulloch), called to attend when a horse attacked by a large animal, stumbles upon the killings. She calls Nick (David Giuntoli), who arrives with other police. A traumatized survivor raves "Bigfoot killed them!", and the media picks up on this story.

Monroe is woken by an intruder, whom he discovers is his friend Larry (Kenneth Mitchell), stuck in Wesen form. He calls Nick. Police approach Monroe's house with tracker dogs. Monroe puts on Larry's shirt and sets out to lead the dogs elsewhere. In the woods, he takes on Wesen form and frightens the dogs off - but Hank (Russell Hornsby) has him cornered. Still in Wesen form, he attacks Hank, knocking him down, and runs off. Bewildered by what he has just seen, Hank calls Nick.

While Nick and Monroe watch in horror, Larry desperately claws at his own neck, pulls out a device, and dies. Monroe and Nick place Larry's body in the woods, leaving the device in his hand to be found by police. The team duly investigates. Hank says that the man doesn't look the same as when he attacked him. Another attack occurs, this time resulting in the death of the (Wesen) attacker. He has a device in his neck - the same as Larry's.

The device - a drug pump - leads Nick and the team to therapist Konstantin Brinkerhoff (Roger Bart) who has developed a drug to control the conversion between human and Wesen form. Another man using the drug has also died, and Brinkerhoff is using it on himself. Following his own leads, Monroe goes to confront Brinkerhoff, who turns Wesen as the effect of the drug wanes. Nick arrives to question Brinkerhoff, who escapes and runs amok, ending up in a theater. Hank shoots him and is shocked to see the Wesen revert to human form. Nick pretends he did not see the change.

As the episode ends, Juliette tells Nick about the tests she performed on DNA from the creature that attacked the horse: it was neither human nor any known animal. For the first time in her life, she is starting to wonder if the stories about Bigfoot and others might all be true.

== Reception ==
=== Viewers ===
The episode was viewed by 4.45 million people, earning a 1.2/4 in the 18-49 rating demographics on the Nielson ratings scale, ranking third on its timeslot and sixth for the night in the 18-49 demographics, behind CSI: NY, Blue Bloods, 20/20, Primetime: What Would You Do?, and Shark Tank. This was a 6% decrease in viewership from the previous episode, which was watched by 4.73 from a 1.4/4 in the 18-49 demographics. This means that 1.2 percent of all households with televisions watched the episode, while 4 percent of all households watching television at that time watched it.

=== Critical reviews ===
"Big Feet" received mixed-to-positive reviews. The A.V. Club's Kevin McFarland gave the episode a "B+" grade and wrote, "What a difference a week makes. 'Big Feet' faces many of the same challenges that last weeks' Cinderella-themed episode had to deal with, bringing in a character from legend that is well-known but perhaps doesn't necessarily fit easily within the world Grimm has created for itself over the course of its first season. This time, that story is Bigfoot, which gets introduced via some Blair Witch Project documentary camerawork as some cryptozoologists run into a very angry creature. But I'll be damned if Grimm doesn't just pull the whole thing off. Just about everything that went wrong with last week's episode — too much focus on the episodic characters, not enough of Nick/Hank/Monroe, little exploration of any of the relationships the show has built so far — didn't happen here, instead replaced by a rather taut and thrilling standalone episode that manages to whip through an interesting bit of Wesen subculture while also slowly advancing the glaring fact that Nick will have to tell Juliette exactly who he is."

Nick McHatton from TV Fanatic, gave a 2.8 star rating out of 5, stating: "There was at least one good thing to come out of 'Big Feet,' with Juliette finally hopping back on the Wesen trail and telling Nick about her findings. The rest of the episode set up almost nothing, and instead sent the story momentum Grimm has been building up over the last few months crashing and burning."

Shilo Adams from TV Overmind wrote, "'Big Feet' was a noticeable rebound from last week's episode and set up what could be a reveal-heavy finale that lays all the cards on the table. It laid the groundwork, in particular, for both Hank and Juliette to find out about Nick's other life, or at least the existence of creatures. There have been times earlier in the season where it felt like they were never going to be informed of Nick's Grimm life, that thread just twisting in the wind for all to see, but all that slow burn was worth the price of admission to 'Big Feet'. Grimm can feel a little too insular at times, Nick's secret not being able to be shared with a good chunk of the supporting cast, so bringing at least one, if not both, of his confidantes will open things up that much more."
