= Blind Love (Grimm) =

- Grimm episode
- Episode no.: Season 6 Episode 7
- Directed by: Aaron Lipstadt
- Written by: Sean Calder
- Cinematography by: Ross Berryman
- Editing by: Kevin Soares
- Production code: 607
- Original air date: February 17, 2017
- Running time: 42 minutes

Guest appearances
- Chris L. McKenna as Lt. Grossante; Jay Paulson as Randy Goode; Hannah R. Loyd as Diana Schade-Renard

Episode chronology
| ← Previous "Breakfast in Bed" | Next → "The Son Also Rises" |
- Grimm season 6

"Blind Love" is the seventh episode of season 6 of the supernatural drama television series Grimm and the 117th episode overall, which premiered on February 17, 2017, on the broadcast (over-the-air) network NBC. The episode was written by Sean Calder and was directed by Aaron Lipstadt. In the episode, the gang goes to a getaway for Monroe's birthday. However, a hotel employee is targeting Nick after he jailed his father. Eve is visited by an evil force while Renard is confronted by Lt. Grossante.

The episode received positive reviews from critics, who praised the character development but some criticized it for not advancing enough story.

== Plot ==
Rosalee (Bree Turner) surprises Monroe (Silas Weir Mitchell) with a getaway for his birthday and invites most of the gang to join them. Things take a shocking turn when a hotel employee targets Nick (David Giuntoli) in an effort to avenge his father. Using some body fluids, he makes all of them, except Rosalee due to her pregnancy, fall in love randomly with each other, so they will fight each other to death. The spell breaks when he's killed. Meanwhile, Eve (Bitsie Tulloch) gets a visit from a dark force that she has seen before. Elsewhere, Capt. Renard (Sasha Roiz) spends the weekend with Diana (Hannah R. Loyd) when a former ally, Lt. Grossante (Chris L. McKenna), decides to get even by kidnapping her. But he's unaware of her powers, and she gives him a painful lesson.

== Reception ==
=== Viewers ===
The episode was viewed by 3.92 million people, earning a 0.8/3 in the 18-49 rating demographics on the Nielson ratings scale, ranking third on its timeslot and seventh for the night in the 18-49 demographics, behind Dr. Ken, 20/20, MacGyver, Blue Bloods, Shark Tank, Last Man Standing, and Hawaii Five-0. This was a 2% decrease in viewership from the previous episode, which was watched by 4.00 million viewers with a 0.7/3. This means that 0.8 percent of all households with televisions watched the episode, while 3 percent of all households watching television at that time watched it. With DVR factoring in, the episode had a 1.4 ratings share in the 18-49 demographics.

=== Critical reviews ===
"Blind Love" received positive reviews. Les Chappell from The A.V. Club wrote, "I said a couple of weeks ago that Grimm tends to spend most of its time in darker places, and it seems that this final season is determined to prove that statement wrong. 'Blind Love' is easily one of the most outright comic episodes that the series has ever put forth, reminiscent of a Buffy or Angel one-off episode where they'd introduce an odd idea for the episode and see how that weirdness played out within the established framework. And not coincidentally, it's also one of the best stand-alone episodes that the show's done in a long time."

Kathleen Wiedel from TV Fanatic, gave a 4 star rating out of 5, stating: "If there were a prize for the highest ham in an episode of television, I think Grimm Season 6 Episode 7 might be a serious contender. Not that this was a bad thing! Sometimes, you just want the actors to let loose and chew the scenery, and enjoy forty-two minutes of utter ridiculousness."

Sara Netzley from EW gave the episode a "B+" rating and wrote, "Overall, this felt like a bit of a victory lap for Grimm, with the absurd love declarations that play on our long familiarity with these characters and quick little flashbacks to earlier episodes. (Nick looked like a baby in the pilot!) And what show deserves it more than the little fairy tale procedural that could?"

TV.com, wrote, "Was 'Blind Love' funny? Sure. As far as the main plot, you've got talented actors and writer Sean Calder shook things up a little. Russell Hornsby got to sing to himself in a mirror. Reggie Lee got to recite love poetry. David Giuntoli bellows like he's Marlon Brando in A Streetcar Named Desire. We got flashbacks to when Nick and Monroe first met. We even had a little bit of angst with the situation between Adalind and Eve, where Eve (or Juliette, or whoever) got to express some of the resentment at Adalind that some of us figure is brewing beneath the surface."

Christine Horton of Den of Geek wrote, "Ultimately, 'Blind Love' is a bit of a throwaway episode, and if you miss it, it won't make any difference to the rest of the season. But you can't help but feel like this is one final hurrah before things take a much darker turn for the remainder of the season."
