= The End (Grimm) =

- Grimm episode
- Episode no.: Season 6 Episode 13
- Directed by: David Greenwalt
- Written by: David Greenwalt; Jim Kouf
- Cinematography by: Ross Berryman
- Editing by: George Pilkinton
- Production code: 613
- Original air date: March 31, 2017
- Running time: 42 minutes

Guest appearances
- Jacqueline Toboni as Theresa "Trubel" Rubel; Wil Traval as Zerstörer; Kevin Joy as Adult Kelly Schade-Burkhardt; Nicole Steinwedell as Adult Diana Schade-Renard; Hannah R. Loyd as Diana Schade-Renard; Robert Blanche as Sgt. Franco; Kate Burton as Marie Kessler (special guest star); Mary Elizabeth Mastrantonio as Kelly Burkhardt (special guest star)

Episode chronology
← Previous "Zerstörer Shrugged"	Next → —
- Grimm season 6

"The End" is the series finale of the supernatural drama television series Grimm, consisting of the 13th episode of season 6 and the 123rd episode overall, which premiered on March 31, 2017, on the cable network NBC. The episode was written by series co-creators David Greenwalt and Jim Kouf and was directed by Greenwalt.

The show centers on Nick Burkhardt (David Giuntoli), a Portland Police Department homicide detective who discovers that he is the last descendant of a group of guardians named "Grimms" who had to protect the world from a group of Wesen, mythical creatures which only the Grimms can see. He is aided by his partner Hank Griffin (Russell Hornsby) and a Wesen named Monroe (Silas Weir Mitchell) to solve cases related to the Wesen and stop them from causing an uprising in the human world. Throughout the course of the show, Nick has faced terrorist Wesen organizations such as the Verrat, the Royal Family, the Wesenrein and Black Claw which sought to invoke a greater power of Wesen over humans on Earth. His fight against the Wesen has also caused consequences to his life. In the final episode, Nick along with his friends seeks to destroy Zerstörer, who plans on taking Diana and Kelly for his purposes.

The finale received a mostly positive reception from both critics and fans who praised the conclusion of the storylines and David Giuntoli's performance in the episode. While some thought the finale was rushed, they concluded that the series got a "satisfying" ending to the show.

== Plot ==
Opening quote: "Thy rod and thy staff they comfort me."

Nick (David Giuntoli) regains consciousness and finds Zerstörer gone. He tries to revive Hank (Russell Hornsby) and Wu (Reggie Lee) with the stick but it doesn't work. Trubel (Jacqueline Toboni) arrives and finds the precinct filled with dead officers. Deducing that bullets cannot work, they decide they have to cut off Zerstörer's head in order to kill him permanently. He warns Adalind (Claire Coffee) and Renard (Sasha Roiz) about it but they tell him that Zerstörer not only wants Diana (Hannah R. Loyd), he also wants Kelly. Nick leaves but sends Trubel to the cabin to protect them.

Meanwhile, in the spice shop, Eve (Bitsie Tulloch), Monroe (Silas Weir Mitchell) and Rosalee (Bree Turner) do research to find a way to kill Zerstörer. They find that "one's blood" may be enough to kill him and Rosalee begins developing a potion named "Force Du Sang", requiring the blood of three opposed forces: a Grimm, a Wesen and a Hexenbiest. Nick arrives at the spice shop to inform them of Hank's and Wu's deaths. After Monroe and Rosalee leave for the cabin, Nick and Eve are attacked by Zerstörer (Wil Traval), who uses his staff to make Eve stab herself, killing her. Zerstörer disappears before Nick suffers a breakdown. Nick eventually arrives at the cabin where he, Adalind and Monroe put their blood in a bowl for the potion. Diana appears and announces that Zerstörer will arrive as Nick's stick reveals his location, intending to retrieve it.

Zerstörer arrives and Diana willingly goes with him. Renard attacks him but he's no match for Zerstörer, who stabs him in the heart with the staff, killing him. Monroe throws the potion on Zerstörer, making him suffer a breakdown but the effects soon disappear, finding that there's nothing that can kill it. Adalind tries to kill him with an ax but he takes it and kills her with a slash to the chest. He then has his staff shift into a snake that bites Rosalee and Monroe, killing them too. Zerstörer leaves, leaving Nick to cope with his losses. Zerstörer uses his staff to strangle Trubel before Nick arrives. Zerstörer states that he only needs the stick and in exchange for the stick, he will bring back those who died, proving it by resurrecting Trubel.

Nick decides to give him the stick but Trubel takes it and runs into the woods. Nick intercepts her and they get into a fight until Nick beats her and takes the stick. He is then haunted by voices inside his head until his mother Kelly (Mary Elizabeth Mastrantonio) and Aunt Marie (Kate Burton) appear. Against his wishes, both of them stop Nick from going and inform him that what he needs is his ancestors' strength to battle Zerstörer. Nick, Kelly, Trubel and Marie then join and attack Zerstörer, managing to cut one of his arms. Nick then takes the staff, which unites itself with the stick and stabs Zerstörer in the chest, effectively killing him. Kelly and Marie explain that they are all descendants from the First Grimm and disappear (confirming that this was all in Nick's head). However, Diana appears and reveals that she managed to see Kelly and Marie.

Just then, Zerstörer's body disintegrates and his remains create a portal and begins to suck the staff within. Nick refuses to let go of the staff and is sucked into the portal. Nick is hurled into the scene where he and Eve returned from the Other Place in Monroe's house with everybody alive. Diana then tells Nick that Zerstörer is dead and as such, they are all safe. After greeting everyone, they discover that the staff also passed through the portal.

A narration reveals that Nick did not know what to say and Zerstörer never entered the world. 20 years later, in a modernized trailer, a person narrates how Nick managed to defeat him with his blood, and the ones from Kelly, Marie and Trubel, who is also revealed to be his third cousin on his mother's side. He concludes by saying, "Some will say it's just a myth, legend or fairy tale but I know it's true because my father told me so", revealing to be a grown-up Kelly Burkhardt (Kevin Joy). He is then joined by a grown-up Diana (Nicole Steinwedell), who grabs the Zerstörer's staff and tells him to get ready to hunt Wesen with their parents as well as Monroe's and Rosalee's triplets. While Kelly leaves, Diana stares for a minute on the Grimm diaries before showing her purple eyes. This causes the book to close with its cover showing a big "G". The series ends with the words, "The End" followed by "Thank You" translated in many languages.

== Production ==
=== Development ===
On April 5, 2016, Grimm was renewed for a sixth season by NBC, despite decreasing ratings and being "on the bubble" for 2 months. However, a few weeks later, the network announced that the season would be cut from its usual 22 episodes format to just 13 episodes with possible midseason premiere although the network have commented that they have the option to increase the number of episodes. Later, when NBC unveiled its fall schedule for the 2016-17 television schedule, Grimm was given the 9:00 p.m. at Fridays timeslot but no premiere date was announced. This, along with the continuing decreasing ratings of the second half of the fifth season prompted analysts to question if the sixth season could be its last although co-creators David Greenwalt and Jim Kouf have stated that they weren't sure if the season would be its last.

Finally, on August 29, 2016, NBC officially announced that the sixth season would be the last of the series and that the premiere date would be at January 6, 2017 an hour earlier than the given 9:00 p.m. timeslot with uninterrupted episodes and the finale set to be broadcast on March 31, 2017. The writers commented on the final season, "The fact that we got this concept going and we were able to actually explore all these psychological motivations dealing with history, mythology and fairy tales and dealing with religion and belief and all those things that you can't do on a regular show, and just have it come full circle, which you'll see in the end of the season, I think that's the most satisfying thing. Somehow we just kind of pulled it off for a whole 123 episodes with an arc that makes sense." In December 2016, it was revealed on a tweet that the final episode would be titled, "The End" and would be written by series co-creators David Greenwalt and Jim Kouf and directed by Greenwalt.

=== Writing ===
Before the sixth season was announced, Giuntoli expressed his hopes for the finale, "If we get a Season 6, it could very well be our last season, and it will be the first time that the writers would get to write to an ending. If we do, it'll be a very fun ride, with major events."

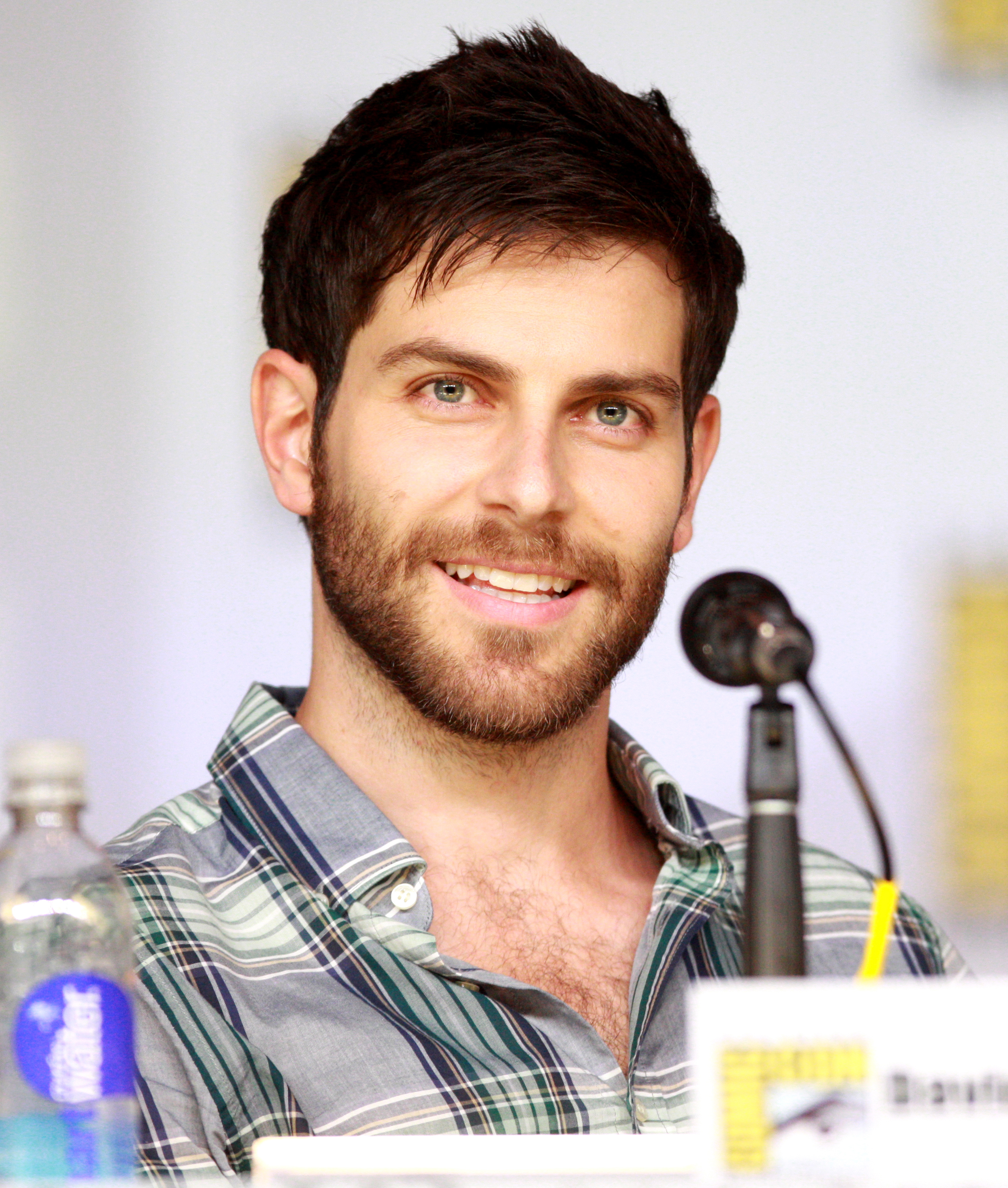
David Giuntoli said that the finale "will be a satisfying ending for fans."

Giuntoli claimed that the series finale "Was a satisfying ending to read. I think it will be a satisfying ending for fans." Giuntoli also added that the finale would feature a time jump. For her part, Bitsie Tulloch mentioned that the themes of the finale were "Family, loyalty, revenge, forgiveness. Because it's the final season you see many loose ends being tied up." She also added that "I think people will like the way it ends. It's a mostly happy ending (it can't be completely happy -- it is Grimm after all). There are a few things that are slightly open-ended, so it feels like everyone wins."

Co-creators Greenwalt and Kouf discussed that they wrote everyone's deaths to show Nick at his worst moment, "That's the logic of it. Because if you're fighting great evil and great evil wants something that is going to destroy the world and he's got to convince you that it's worth it to give this to him so he can destroy the world, you've got to take a lot away from [Nick]." They also explained, "And Nick was ready to make that Devil's bargain, too, to have his loved ones back, until he had a somewhat supernatural experience of the strength of his blood and his ancestors who came before him, and then naturally who would come after him. I mean, just imagine if we had just killed everybody and he just walks off to the drug store! Everyone would have had a big fit." They also explained, "The point was not to have a lethal ending or a happily-ever-after ending, the point was to take Nick to the lowest possible point he could be, where he thought he could not possibly dig any deeper inside. And he was willing to give up the world so that he could have his loved ones, as anyone would do in that position. But then kind of mystically, and kind of not mystically, his ancestors appeared to him, and he found a deeper strength than he even knew he had. And that was really the theme, his deepening purpose as a post-modern Grimm." They also added that they were planning on bringing more previous cast members, among them Danny Bruno as Bud Wurstner but time constraints forced them to stop it from happening. The surprise addition of Mary Elizabeth Mastrantonio and Kate Burton was easy to get and they were given two days to film their scenes. However, a snowstorm in Portland delayed the production five days and left the actresses with just one day to film the scenes.

About the time jump 20 years later, Greenwalt and Kouf stated that everyone is "all just one big, happy family, fighting evil monsters" with Trubel "definitely out there." Greenwalt said, "That's the big question: what did happen to Diana and Kelly? And we also always had the image of the book itself closing, and that being the final image, except for saying 'thank you' to the fans. Then to go not only full circle in terms of a myth/legend/fairy tale but actually go out to the future and have a guy say, 'What you've been seeing is all true. I know it happened because my father told me,' that always struck me as really strong, kind of an oral history and written history of these kinds of tales." Regarding a spin-off or anything related to the scenes, Kouf said, "We always thought it was a fairytale ending, and fairytales don't seem to end. They don't go away, they're always with us and they keep going on, so what a perfect way to end this type of series with a new beginning."

Regarding the fans' efforts to save the show through many petitions on Change.org, Kouf commented "I think the fans are fantastic for doing that. It just shows you how much they love the show. I think it's great, who knows what'll happen, but it's hard to consider something that nobody has put in front of us." Greenwalt, for his part, said, "We so appreciate the broad reach of this kind of storytelling. There's something universal about all of this worldwide, and we're so grateful that people connected with the show, and we thank them for that because without that we wouldn't be doing it. He also said, "you never know."

== Reception ==
=== Critical reviews ===
"The End" received positive reviews. Terri Schwartz from IGN gave the episode a "great" 8.0 rating out of 10 and wrote in her verdict, "Grimm offered up a satisfying series finale that successfully brought the show to a close. Nick's journey as a Grimm felt like it was given its proper due, and the episode both had stakes while also delivering a happy ending. The jump forward in time at the end was particularly successful, promising that the fairy tale continues on even if we aren't watching it."

Les Chappell from The A.V. Club gave the episode an "A−" rating and wrote, "'The End' is a series finale that definitely has that mood of a last go-around to it, the feeling that there's nothing to be gained by holding back. A literal devil walking the earth for ultimate power, a nigh nuclear poison to be brewed that takes all their combined talents, and the intervention of Grimms from beyond the grave — all of it is on display here. Even though there are some quibbles, they're quibbles that are as much a part of the Grimm experience as the witticisms and monsters."

Sara Netzley from EW gave the episode a "A" rating and wrote, "'Thy rod and thy staff they comfort me.' These words open the final episode of the little fairy tale show that could. And at first, they seem cruelly ironic, as nothing about the Zerstörer's staff is a comfort to Nick, who endures losses that almost break him. Thankfully, that comfort isn't an empty promise, and Grimm closes its six-season run with a reminder that it's the people we love who give us our strength."

Kevin Yeoman from Screen Rant, wrote, "There's an It's A Wonderful Life quality to Grimm's final few moments (before an obligatory time jump reveals that Nick's son Kelly and Diana are carrying on the family tradition 20 years in the future) that brings everyone back to life, but robs the finale of some of its dramatic power. But while wiping out nearly every character on the show would have been a memorably bleak way to end things, Grimm seeks to imbue the finale with emotional weight by applying the tried and true formula of the importance of family. Whether or not that undercuts what was building up to be a remarkably violent and somber end will likely depend on how much mileage you get from the idea of ghosts returning to help the living in their time of need. In the end, it works as an appropriate narrative loophole affording the series the chance to reminisce about its television journey while also playing with (though not fully committing to) the idea of truly bringing things to an end. With that, Grimm signs off for the last time."

Kevin Yeoman from Oregon Live, wrote, "As 'Grimm' reminded us, before Walt Disney and other family friendly folk got their hands on the Brothers Grimm stories, they were often as dark as the Black Forest, with monsters preying on innocent victims, until the happy ending -- we hoped -- restored order. It was fitting, then, that the 'Grimm' series finale, appropriately titled 'The End,' sent Nick through a nightmarish journey, before closing the book with an ending that evoked both fairy tales and the show's own mythology."

Not all reviews were positive. Kathleen Wiedel from TV Fanatic was more critical of the finale, giving it a 2.5 star rating out of 5, stating, "Not. Gonna. Stick. The whole plotline with Zerstörer annoyed me from the outset, but as I noted in the review for Grimm Season 6 Episode 12, it was really the stupid choices made by normally-intelligent characters that galled me the most. This time around, we not only got poor decision-making skills but also some of the most head-scratching moments of deus ex machina I've seen the entire series!"

=== Accolades ===
TVLine named Giuntoli the "Performer of the Week" for the week of April 1, 2017, for his performance in the finale. The site wrote, "'The End' is a fitting finish for NBC's fairytale series, and Giuntoli's performance is a crowning glory for his time on the show."
