= Breakfast in Bed (disambiguation) =

"Breakfast in Bed" is a 1969 song by Dusty Springfield, also recorded by UB40 together with Chrissie Hynde.

Breakfast in Bed may also refer to:

== Film and television ==
- Breakfast in Bed, a 1930 film directed by Fred Guiol
- Breakfast in Bed (film), a 1963 German comedy film
- Breakfast in Bed, a 1977 film starring Jenny Sullivan and John Ritter
- Breakfast in Bed, a film starring Marilyn Chambers
- "Breakfast in Bed" (Grimm), a television episode

== Music ==
- Breakfast in Bed (album), by Joan Osborne, 2007
- "Breakfast in Bed", a song by Brenda K. Starr from Brenda K. Starr, 1987
- "Breakfast in Bed", a song by Deep Purple from Slaves and Masters, 1990
- "Breakfast in Bed", a song by Dntel from Dumb Luck, 2007
- "Breakfast in Bed", a song by Loudon Wainwright III from Little Ship, 1997
- "Breakfast in Bed", a song by Mayer Hawthorne from Man About Town, 2016
- "Breakfast in Bed", a song by Train from Save Me, San Francisco, 2009
