= Zerstörer Shrugged =

- Grimm episode
- Episode no.: Season 6 Episode 12
- Directed by: Aaron Lipstadt
- Story by: David Greenwalt; Jim Kouf
- Teleplay by: Breanna Kouf
- Cinematography by: Eliot Rockett
- Editing by: Scott Boyd
- Production code: 612
- Original air date: March 24, 2017
- Running time: 42 minutes

Guest appearances
- Jacqueline Toboni as Theresa "Trubel" Rubel; Wil Traval as Zerstörer; Hannah R. Loyd as Diana Schade-Renard; Robert Blanche as Franco

Episode chronology
← Previous "Where the Wild Things Were"	Next → "The End"
- Grimm season 6

"Zerstörer Shrugged" is the 12th episode of season 6 of the supernatural drama television series Grimm and the 122nd episode overall, which premiered on March 24, 2017, on the cable network NBC. The episode was written by Brenna Kouf from a story by the series co-creators David Greenwalt and Jim Kouf and was directed by Aaron Lipstadt. In the episode, Nick and Eve struggle to fight against Zerstörer, who is also wanting to leave the other place and go to the real world to retrieve Diana for his own purposes. For her own protection, Adalind and Renard take her to the house where Nick had his first Grimm case but there are consequences along the way. The episode is the conclusion of a two-parter with the previous episode as the first part.

The episode received positive reviews from critics, who praised the Zerstörer's performance in the episode but some found the pace to be slowed down.

== Plot ==
Eve (Bitsie Tulloch) and Nick (David Giuntoli) are in the other place, after forcing to be wogue by Zerstörer ("Destroyer" in German) they try to fight him together. Wu (Reggie Lee), Hank (Russell Hornsby), and Rosalee (Bree Turner) translate that the Zerstorer needs Nick in order to travel to present day Earth. Diana (Hannah R. Loyd) opens the portal to bring Nick back not knowing it would bring back the Zerstorer as well.

Diana hides with Kelly in the cabin in the woods from "Pilot" under Adalind (Claire Coffee) and Renard's (Sasha Roiz) protection since the whole gang believes Zerstorer is after Diana. Diana has a vision and knows that Zerstorer wants her and her brother Kelly too. Trubel (Jacqueline Toboni) arrives, having finished dismantling the criminal Wesen organization Black Claw for good. Monroe (Silas Weir Mitchell), Rosalee, and Eve figure out the stick they found in the Black forest is actually a long-hidden shard of wood from Zerstörer's powerful staff. Zerstörer attacks the precinct, to get the stick back from Nick, killing several officers including impaling Hank through the throat and stabbing Wu in the stomach.

== Reception ==
=== Viewers ===
The episode was viewed by 4.14 million people, earning a 0.8/3 in the 18-49 rating demographics on the Nielson ratings scale, ranking third on its timeslot and fifth for the night in the 18-49 demographics, behind Dr. Ken, Dateline NBC, Last Man Standing, and an NCAA Tournament. This was a 4% increase in viewership from the previous episode, which was watched by 3.96 million viewers with a 0.8/3. This means that 0.8 percent of all households with televisions watched the episode, while 3 percent of all households watching television at that time watched it.

=== Critical reviews ===
"Zerstörer Shrugged" received positive reviews. Les Chappell from The A.V. Club wrote, "While I still think it would have been interesting to see more of Zerstörer and the Other Place throughout the season, 'Zerstörer Shrugged' does a lot to make the Destroyer live up to his reputation. His entrance heralded by a flock of dead bats, diving through a mirror in Olympic style, human beings swatted away as if they were less than said bats, a flood of terrifying analogies in the Grimm diaries, Diana genuinely terrified for the first time in her young life: the sense of dread and impossible odds builds well over the episode’s run time."

Kathleen Wiedel from TV Fanatic was more critical of the episode, giving it a 1.5 star rating out of 5, stating, "It was understandable in the sense that the series is at an end, drama, loss, high stakes, and so on, but it just felt so sudden and pointless due to the lack of intelligent behavior earlier in the episode. Of course, it would've made for a completely different story if Nick just drove off, leaving Zerstörer hiking after him. (It's not like Mr. Skullface can drive, right?)"

Sara Netzley from EW gave the episode a "A" rating and wrote, "Going into the finale, we now know the final battle’s going to involve Zerstörer going after the stick and/or Diana and/or Kelly, and Nick definitely had incentive to protect all three. But if bullets don’t stop the guy, what do they have left?"

TV.com, wrote, "So overall, 'Zerstörer Shrugged' did what they did last week. It pretty much put everything into place for the series finale. Zerstörer has been established as really really tough, because a) he's even more bulletproof than he was last week, and b) he kills two Team Grimmers. We learn that he not only wants Diana but Kelly. Although again, not with any foreshadowing or lead-in, but just having Diana having a prophetic dream. What's the point of featuring lots of page flipping if it doesn't find basic plots like 'Devil's Child Bride's Brother is Also Important.'"
