= Tree People =

- Grimm episode
- Episode no.: Season 6 Episode 9
- Directed by: Jim Kouf
- Written by: Brenna Kouf
- Cinematography by: Ross Berryman
- Editing by: Scott Boyd
- Production code: 609
- Original air date: March 3, 2017
- Running time: 42 minutes

Guest appearances
- Mac Brandt as Ralph Rotterman; Alla Korot as Dasha Karpushin; Hannah R. Loyd as Diana Schade-Renard

Episode chronology
← Previous "The Son Also Rises"	Next → "Blood Magic"
- Grimm season 6

"Tree People" is the 9th episode of season 6 of the supernatural drama television series Grimm and the 119th episode overall, which premiered on March 3, 2017, on the cable network NBC. The episode was written by Brenna Kouf and was directed by series co-creator Jim Kouf. In the episode, Nick, Hank and Wu investigate a poacher who claims that his friend was killed by a tree-like Wesen, which is connected to more disappearances.

The episode received positive reviews from critics, who praised the character development but some criticized it for its pace just like the previous episodes.

== Plot ==
After learning about Eve (Bitsie Tulloch) and Nick's (David Giuntoli) experiences with the mirror, all the group decides to use a buddy system when looking into a mirror, to prevent anyone from being taken. Nick, Hank (Russell Hornsby) and Wu (Reggie Lee) investigate the case of a poacher who claims that his friend was killed by a tree-like monster, and they soon find more unexplained disappearances in the same forest. When they find a tree with human faces, they deduce it's the joint work of two creatures from Japanese folklore. With Monroe (Silas Weir Mitchell) and Rosalee's (Bree Turner) help, they set up a trap, and are apparently successful in stopping them.

== Reception ==
=== Viewers ===
The episode was viewed by 4.23 million people, earning a 0.8/3 in the 18-49 rating demographics on the Nielson ratings scale, ranking second on its timeslot and fourth for the night in the 18-49 demographics, behind Dateline NBC, a rerun of Hawaii Five-0, and Shark Tank. This was a 5% increase in viewership from the previous episode, which was watched by 4.01 million viewers with a 0.8/3. This means that 0.8 percent of all households with televisions watched the episode, while 3 percent of all households watching television at that time watched it.

=== Critical reviews ===
"Tree People" received positive reviews. Les Chappell from The A.V. Club wrote, "'Tree People' is one of those Grimm episodes where the creative team puts its world building on hold and tosses its heroes into the unknown. While most conventional episodes have Nick learning about a new portion of the wesen world, installments like 'Volcanalis' or 'La Llorona' introduce an air of an even deeper mystery, creatures that not even his ancestors' journals or his wesen allies can fully explain. Rather than sabotaging the world-building, it helps keep the feeling that there's still uncharted territory in the world."

Kathleen Wiedel from TV Fanatic, gave a 3 star rating out of 5, stating: "Yeah, sure, the victims in Grimm Season 6 Episode 9 were all vile, nature-destroying malefactors, but what a way to go...! This story featured not one but two flora-related beings, the kinoshimobe and the people-eating tree. It's really sort of perplexing that this sort of thing hasn't come up before, actually."

Sara Netzley from EW gave the episode a "B+" rating and wrote, "All in all, this was a fun episode! In some ways, the villains were more sympathetic than their victims, which always produces interesting tension. Plus, Nick was able to contribute to the collected Grimm knowledge, and, as always, the chemistry between this excellent cast was off the charts. We also saw a bit of forward momentum on the ancient calendar/mirror demon story front, plus a pinch of love triangle angst, which I have to believe is setting us up for the final story lines still to come. Four more episodes, folks!"

TV.com, wrote, "So overall, 'Tree People' was a decent episode. But like most of this season's 'final chapter' it seemed oddly placed. It would have been an above-average episode in any other season. But as fifth from the end of the series, it's just in a weird place. It's same-old same-old, in a finale season where the creative team had the chance to give us a lot more."

Christine Horton of Den of Geek wrote, "Overall, this was a solid episode that brought out the show's sense of fun, while providing some solid creepy moments in the forest. We're none the wiser about any of the bigger themes at work (has Black Claw now disappeared entirely, despite claiming it was out for a revenge a few weeks ago?) so this indicates the last few episodes will really have to ramp up the action to give us the finale the show deserves."
