= Breakfast in Bed (Grimm) =

- Grimm episode
- Episode no.: Season 6 Episode 6
- Directed by: Julie Herlocker
- Written by: Kyle McVey
- Cinematography by: Eliot Rockett
- Editing by: Scott Boyd
- Production code: 606
- Original air date: February 10, 2017
- Running time: 42 minutes

Guest appearances
- Damien Puckler as Martin Meisner; William Russ as Scott Mudgett; Charles Baker as Dan Wells; Carlos Gomez as Anselmo Baledin

Episode chronology
← Previous "The Seven Year Itch"	Next → "Blind Love"
- Grimm season 6

"Breakfast in Bed" is the sixth episode of season 6 of the supernatural drama television series Grimm and the 116th episode overall, which premiered on February 10, 2017, on the cable network NBC. The episode was written by Kyle McVey and was directed by Julie Herlocker. In the episode, Nick and Hank investigate a Wesen who is using a hotel as a base for his crimes, involving eating dreams. Meanwhile, Monroe and Rosalee discover more about the symbols on the cloth while Renard is told news about Black Claw.

The episode received mixed-to-positive reviews from critics, who criticized the fact that the show is not progressing any development for the finale.

== Plot ==
A violent murder puts Nick (David Giuntoli) and Hank (Russell Hornsby) on the tail of an alp, a Wesen that eats dreams and seems to be using a cheap hotel as hunting ground. Meanwhile, Eve (Bitsie Tulloch), Monroe (Silas Weir Mitchell) and Rosalee (Bree Turner) try to decipher the symbols on the cloth that covered the wooden shard, discovering it is an astronomical map that points to a future date; some of the symbols suggest the seven stars of a cluster of stars known as Pleiades.

Meisner's (Damien Puckler) ghost warns Renard (Sasha Roiz) of an ambush by the Black Claw and Renard dispatches them.

== Reception ==
=== Viewers ===
The episode was viewed by 4.00 million people, earning a 0.7/3 in the 18-49 rating demographics on the Nielson ratings scale, ranking third on its timeslot and seventh for the night in the 18-49 demographics, behind 20/20, Be My Valentine, Charlie Brown, MacGyver, Blue Bloods, Shark Tank, and Hawaii Five-0. This was a 2% decrease in viewership from the previous episode, which was watched by 4.08 million viewers with a 0.8/3. This means that 0.7 percent of all households with televisions watched the episode, while 3 percent of all households watching television at that time watched it. With DVR factoring in, the episode had a 1.4 ratings share in the 18-49 demographics.

=== Critical reviews ===
"Breakfast in Bed" received mixed-to-positive reviews. Les Chappell from The A.V. Club gave the episode a "B+" rating and wrote, "But to focus entirely on that joke also runs the risk of devaluing 'Breakfast In Bed,' which is a sturdy Grimm episode even without bringing that into play. It manages to juggle its humorous beats in a story that's ripe with darker and invasive themes, and manages not to devalue either of them as it moves through the mystery. It also takes some welcome steps to advance the ongoing plots, not so much providing clarity as renewing interest in what comes next."

Kathleen Wiedel from TV Fanatic, gave a 2 star rating out of 5, stating: "And this season started out so well. It's so immensely frustrating to have such rich potential squandered so badly, as in Grimm Season 6 Episode 6. Unfortunately, this episode was really quite disappointing on a number of levels that I was literally left wondering what in the world I was just watching. Oi."

Sara Netzley from EW gave the episode a "A" rating and wrote, "This was a fun little entry in the monster-of-the-week cannon that also plays into those ancient fears of sleep paralysis. Plus, we get the news that Nick's magic stick comes wrapped in an ancient cloth with a star map pointing to an unknown event just a few weeks from now? That's some delicious foreshadowing as we hit the midpoint of Grimm's final season."

TV.com, wrote, "Well, 'Breakfast in Bed' wasn't as bad as last week. But it was a near thing. Part of it is because it had even less subplotting than 'The Seven Year Itch.' Renard's issues with Meisner take up about five minutes. Admittedly, there's no mention of Renard's visit to the 'spirit vacuum' last week, and it doesn't seem to have had any impact on anything, hallucinated or real."

Christine Horton of Den of Geek wrote, "We're almost halfway through the final season and many fans might be starting to feel a little perplexed. Despite having only seven episodes left in which to wrap up the entire series – and deliver a finale that is worthy of its own mythological status – right now Grimm is still seemingly content to amble along at a leisurely pace, designating all the interesting plot points to the background while it focuses yet again on a standard Wesen-of-the-week storyline."
