= Buddymoon =

- Theatrical release poster
- Directed by: Alex Simmons
- Written by: Alex Simmons; Flula Borg; David Giuntoli
- Produced by: Alex Simmons; Flula Borg; David Giuntoli; Jennifer Wood
- Starring: Flula Borg; David Giuntoli; Claire Coffee
- Cinematography: Peter Alton; Michael Lockridge
- Edited by: Alex Simmons
- Music by: Gabriel Feenberg
- Production companies: roundthecornerfudge, LLC.
- Distributed by: Orion Pictures; Gravitas Ventures
- Release dates: January 23, 2016 (Slamdance); July 1, 2016 (Theatrical)
- Running time: 80 minutes
- Country: United States
- Language: English

Buddymoon (previously known as Honey Buddies) is a 2016 American independent comedy film directed by Alex Simmons; written by Simmons, Flula Borg, and David Giuntoli; and starring Borg and Giuntoli. It is the story of a former child actor (Giuntoli) whose fiancée leaves him days before their wedding. In an effort to cheer him up, his best friend and would-be best man (Borg) convinces him that the two of them should go on the planned honeymoon trip together.

Buddymoon premiered at the Slamdance Film Festival in Park City, Utah on January 23, 2016 and received their Audience Award for Best Narrative Feature. It also appeared, among other places, at the Florida Film Festival, where it also won the Audience Award for Best Narrative Feature, and it was the opening film for the Ashland (Oregon) Independent Film Festival. In March 2016, worldwide distribution rights to the film were acquired by Gravitas Ventures and Orion Pictures. Its theatrical and home video release was on July 1, 2016.

== Plot ==
David is a former child actor with big plans. Not only is he about to audition for a role in a movie about Lewis and Clark, but he is also about to marry his fiancée, Frankie. Unfortunately, Frankie leaves David just a few days before their wedding. In an effort to help David deal with his grief, his best friend Flula suggests that the two men take the trip that David had planned for his honeymoon with Frankie. After some prodding, David reluctantly accepts this idea, and the two men embark on a seven-day hike through the mountains of Oregon. Along the way, David and Flula interact with a variety of quirky characters, but most importantly they strengthen the bond of friendship between them.

To prepare for his film audition, David is reading the diary of William Clark, which describes not only the Lewis and Clark expedition and their adventures along the trail, but also his friendship and interactions with Meriwether Lewis. As they travel, David notices a series of parallels between his literal and metaphorical journey and the expedition of Lewis and Clark through these same Northwest woods, as well as the friendship between the two men. This creates many points of bonding between David and Flula even as they make their way through one misadventure after another.

== Cast ==
- David Giuntoli as David
- Flula Borg as Flula
- Claire Coffee as Polly
- Brian T. Finney as The Hiker
- Jeanne Syquia as Frankie

== Production ==
Buddymoon was filmed almost entirely (except for a few remaining pick-up shots) for ten days in the summer of 2014 on location in Oregon, and the actors worked from a detailed outline rather than a full script. Because the majority of the film revolves around the main characters' trek through the mountains of Oregon, it was filmed primarily outdoors, and only a few scenes take place indoors. The director shot every scene with two cameras using a "dueling singles" technique and used natural light as much as possible.
