= Caroline and Jackie =

- Theatrical release poster
- Directed by: Adam Christian Clark
- Written by: Adam Christian Clark
- Produced by: Adam Hendricks
- Starring: Marguerite Moreau; Bitsie Tulloch; David Giuntoli; Valerie Azlynn; Jason Gray-Stanford; David Fuit
- Cinematography: Christian Swegal
- Edited by: Adam Christian Clark; Lisa Hendricks
- Music by: Lisbeth Scott
- Production company: Blueberry Films
- Distributed by: Phase 4 Films
- Release dates: April 21, 2012 (Tribeca Film Festival); May 3, 2013 (US Theatrical)
- Running time: 85 minutes
- Country: United States
- Language: English

Caroline and Jackie is a 2013 arthouse drama film written and directed by Adam Christian Clark.

Set in Los Angeles over the course of one night, the script focuses on the emotionally complex relationship between two sisters and their close group of friends.

== Plot ==
The film's opening credits have a lingering sense of unease to them, which is capitalized on as soon as Caroline and Jackie arrive at the “surprise birthday party” Caroline has planned for Jackie (despite her birthday not being for two months and it actually being Caroline's birthday) – where the dynamic between the pair (and Ryan, to some degree) is pushed out to the larger group, ratcheted up by rapid cuts and lingering looks between Jackie's friends. But it's not just a surprise dinner party that Caroline has put together – when the group ends up back at Jackie's place, the real “party” is revealed. It's an intervention for Jackie, headed up by Caroline, who hopes that she and Jackie's friends can help her with a variety of issues – anorexia, pill abuse, alcoholism, and even sexual promiscuity.

When Jackie inevitably flees the house, much of the tension of the film is deflated, but it does allow deeper character reveals, with Caroline making a move on another intervention attendee (or two), Jackie taking off for a bar, and every one of Jackie's supposedly worried friends acting less than caring. Clark uses some noticeable and basic plot tricks – pulling people apart and putting them back together, mixing up interactions between different characters, changing locations – but they all serve his aim, which is to slowly unfold the story in a believable way.

The film sets the sisters up as opposing forces, and a question quickly arises – who is more believable? Is Jackie in denial or is Caroline lying? Is Jackie sick or is Caroline even sicker? Is Jackie coping with alcohol because she's a drunk or because she needs a stiff one after a terrible night?

== Cast ==
- Marguerite Moreau as Caroline
- Bitsie Tulloch as Jackie
- David Giuntoli as Ryan
- Valerie Azlynn as Michelle
- Jason Gray-Stanford as James
- David Fuit as Charlie

== Reception ==
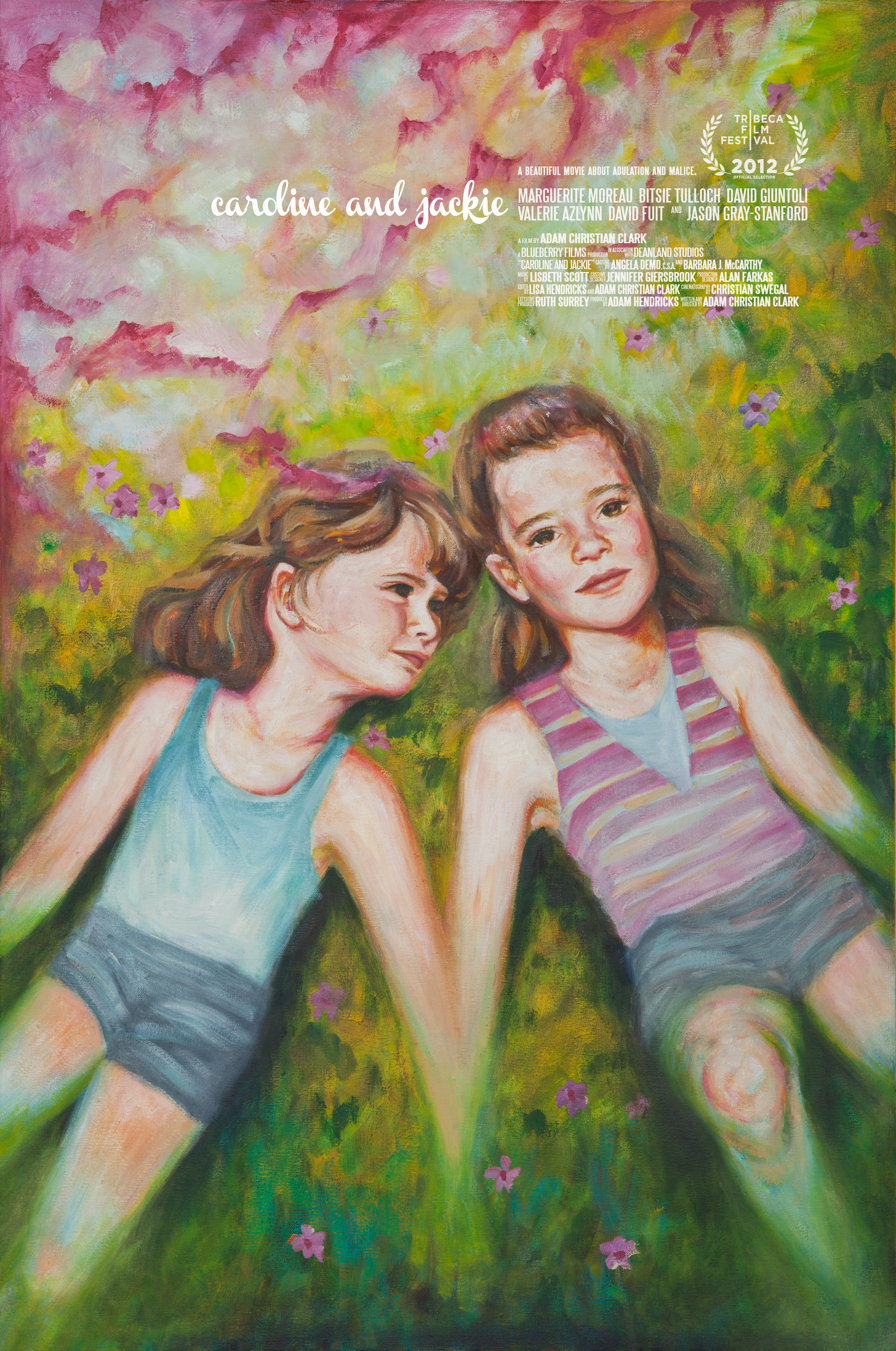
2012 Tribeca Film Festival release poster, by artist Vanessa Prager

Caroline and Jackie was met with mostly positive reviews at both its Tribeca Film Festival premiere and during its theatrical release.

Anita Gates of The New York Times said, "True indie mentality and style are reassuringly alive in 2013 in “Caroline and Jackie,” nicely written and directed...It captures the awkwardness, loneliness and unacknowledged desperation that haunt us all but that are particularly poignant when seen among attractive 30-somethings."

John Anderson of Variety said, "Displaying nerves of steel and a generous heart, helmer Adam Christian Clark takes a lot of chances with "Caroline and Jackie," a tale of troubled sisters that keeps the viewer off balance throughout before delivering a payoff that serves as both catharsis and absolution. While it does make demands of its audience, the cumulative emotional impact is startling."

Steve Dollar of The Wall Street Journal called it "a delicious dinner party meltdown, visually polished and emotionally raw". He praised Moreau and Tulloch for "playing their yin/yang roles with gleaming intensity".

Miranda Siegel of New York Magazine named it a must see film, praising its "top-notch performances" and its "unique combination of naturalistic acting and stylized technique".

Jaime N. Christley of Slant Magazine was not as impressed. He writes, "Writer-director Adam Christian Clark's Caroline and Jackie clobbers the viewer with a wall of insistent stylishness, a Ketel One ad that just won't quit, or Bellflower for people whose Blackberry is a vital organ."

On the review aggregation website Rotten Tomatoes the film has an 80% rating based on reviews from 10 critics. On Metacritic it has a score of 60% based on reviews from 6 critics, indicating "mixed or average" reviews.

== Music ==
In addition to an original score by Lisbeth Scott, the film features the Ruth Brown recording of Nellie Lutcher's "Hurry On Down".
