= Last Grimm Standing =

- Grimm episode
- Episode no.: Season 1 Episode 12
- Directed by: Michael Watkins
- Story by: Cameron Litvack; Thania St. John
- Teleplay by: Naren Shankar; Sarah Goldfinger
- Cinematography by: Cort Fey
- Editing by: George Pilkinton
- Production code: 112
- Original air date: February 24, 2012
- Running time: 42 minutes

Guest appearances
- Nick Chinlund as Leo Taymor; B. J. Britt as Brian Cooney; Robert Blanche as Sgt. Franco

Episode chronology
← Previous "Tarantella"	Next → "Three Coins in a Fuchsbau"
- Grimm season 1

"Last Grimm Standing" is the 12th episode of the supernatural drama television series Grimm of season 1, which premiered on February 24, 2012, on NBC. The teleplay for the episode was written by executive producer Naren Shankar and Sarah Goldfinger, while the story was written by Cameron Litvack and Thania St. John. The episode was directed by Michael Watkins.

== Plot ==
Opening quote: "The beasts were loosed into the arena, and among them, a beast of huge bulk and ferocious aspect. Then the slave was cast in."

A recently retired man and his wife are brutally murdered at their home in the woods. The murderer chews on a piece of raw meat, but flees when he hears people coming. He is caught by men on horseback and dragged away.

Nick and Hank's investigation leads them to a boxing gym, behind which they discover a fighting arena and various gruesome weapons. The arena is for the Löwen Games, run by a Löwen. It is revealed that Renard knows about the games, and has been able to control them by limiting the fighters to a list provided by him, but the Löwen has begun expanding his recruitment base. Renard confronts the Löwen and tells him to close the fight down, but he refuses, saying too much money is involved. Monroe goes undercover to find out more about the Löwen Games, but he is tricked and captured, finding himself conscripted into a fight. Meanwhile, Juliette is anxious about her and Nick's anniversary dinner. She finds a ring in a drawer, leading her to believe that Nick is about to propose.

Nick and Hank arrive at the arena after Monroe's fight has started. Nick tries to stop the fight, but is instead forced to join it. He and Monroe survive long enough for police to arrive in force and stop everything. The Löwen escapes, but is confronted by Renard, who has him killed.

Nick drives home, calling Juliette to apologize for being late for their dinner.

== Reception ==
=== Critical reviews ===
"Last Grimm Standing" received positive reviews. Nick McHatton from TV Fanatic, gave a 4.8 star rating out of 5, stating: "Wow. "Last Grimm Standing" was one crazy episode. There were moments big and small, and they all amounted to something more than what Grimm usually doles out every week. This is the sweet spot where procedurals hit their high points, when the case is interesting and it feeds into the progression of the serial elements."

The A.V. Club's Kevin McFarland gave the episode a "B−" grade and wrote, "An illegal underground fight club between vessen (sic) run by some lion creatures is an exciting premise, but it took Grimm half of the episode to walk through its cookie-cutter steps to even get Eddie (sic) Monroe through the door. With some firecracker previews that focused heavily on the fighting itself, watching Nick and Hank roll through the same steps was especially boring. First we see the crime in question, then the investigation, then some interviews, a jaunt to the Magic Trailer, then the obligatory scene where Nick and Hank repeat all of the information they know so far to Captain Renard, who gives his advice. I could make up a chart for people to fill in with steps to build the first half of a Grimm episode at this point."

Shilo Adams from TV Overmind wrote, "I think Grimm finally shut me up, as “Last Grimm Standing” was the show’s first great episode. It’s had a couple of very, very good ones (“Danse Macabre”, “Organ Grinder”), but Grimm had yet to really put it all together like it did on Friday night. Part of that had to do with how interesting the case, involving an underground Hunger Games-meets-Fight Club Wesen fight club, was. A lot of the Grimm cases have been a little same-y and thus not very distinctive, but the Lowen Games capture just how good the show can get when it goes dark and strange. It brought a lot of personality and edge to the show that some of the more straightforward cases haven’t been able to do and raised the stakes from what we’ve come to expect on Grimm."
