= Cuegle =

Monster from ancient Iberian mythology

The cuegle is a monster in Cantabrian folklore. Walking on two legs and roughly humanoid in shape, it is believed to have black skin, a long beard, grey hair, three arms without hands or fingers, five rows of teeth, a single stubby horn and three eyes in its head: one yellow, one red, and one blue. It is said to have great strength despite its small size. The cuegle attacks people and livestock, and is reputed to steal babies from the cradle. It may be protected against by placing oak or holly leaves, which it finds repulsive, in the cradle.

== See also ==
- El Cuegle
