= Chris McKenna (actor) =

American actor (born 1977)

- Born: Christopher Leigh McKenna; October 18, 1977 (age 49); Queens, New York, U.S.
- Occupation: Actor
- Years active: 1990–present
- Spouse: Lovisa McKenna
- Children: 1

Christopher Leigh McKenna (born October 18, 1977) is an American actor. He is best known for his roles in a number of television series.

== Early life ==
Chris was born in Queens, New York.

== Career ==
McKenna is known to daytime television audiences for his portrayal of Joey Buchanan on ABC's daytime soap opera One Life to Live from 1990 to 1993. McKenna is also known for playing the lead role in the 2003 film King of the Ants, a role which earned him critical acclaim.

On October 22, 2000, McKenna played Greg, a college jock who wants to join the Phi Iota Gamma fraternity in the television drama Touched by an Angel on CBS. In February 2025, it was announced he had joined the cast of General Hospital as Jack Brennan; he made his first appearance on February 4. In August of the following year, it was revealed McKenna would exit the role.

== Filmography ==
=== Film ===
Year	Title	Role	Notes	Ref.
1991	The Boy Who Cried Bitch	Ross		
1997	In & Out	Locker Room Guy		
1997	Academy Boyz	Brookfield Player		
2000	Cement	Highway Patrol Officer #1		
2002	Wishcraft	Shaun		
2003	King of the Ants	Sean Crawley		
2004	King of the Ants: Behind the Scenes	Himself	Video documentary short	
2006	Art School Confidential	Mikey		
2007	Daydreamer	Shane Marcell		
2007	In the Wall	Christopher	Short film	
2008	Prairie Fever	Sheriff Logan		
2011	Holiday Engagement	Jason King		
2013	A Voice in the Dark	Alan		
2014	Blind Pass	Dr. Michael Roselli		
2014	Runaway	Detective Jason Lansing		
2020	The Will	Jake Spear		
2023	Suitable Flesh	Sean Crawley	Continuation of role from King of Ants	

=== Television ===
Year	Title	Role	Notes	Ref.
1990–1993	One Life to Live	Joey Buchanan	Contract role	
1992	Lifestories: Families in Crisis	Michael Darling	Guest; Episode "Gunplay: The Last Day in the Life of Brian Darling"	
1998	Nick Freno: Licensed Teacher	Rodney	Guest; Episode "Foul Play"	
1998	Unhappily Ever After	Mike Baxter	Guest; Episode "Triple Play"	
1998	Touched by an Angel	Harold	Guest; Episode "Beautiful Dreamer"	
1998	That '70s Show	Destroy	Guest; Episode "The Keg"	
2000	Opposite Sex	Rob Perry	Regular; 8 episodes	
2000	Touched by an Angel	Greg	Guest; Episode "Legacy"	
2001	The Practice	Benjamin Smith	Guest; Episode "Home of the Brave"	
2001–2002	That's Life	Rick Daniel	Guest; Episodes "Oh, Baby!" and "Baum's Thesis"	
2002	The District	Greg	Guest; Episode "The Second Man"	
2010	Private Practice	Colin Bowman	Guest; Episode "Best Laid Plans"	
2010	Undercovers	Col. Joseph Korman	Guest; Episode "Crashed"	
2010	NCIS: Los Angeles	CIA Agent	Guest; Episode "Deliverance"	
2011	Rizzoli & Isles	Jim Tolliver	Guest; Episode "Living Proof"	
2011	Harry's Law	Jeremy Preston	Guest; Episode "Hosanna Roseanna"	
2011–2013	90210	Patrick Westhill	Recurring; 7 episodes	
2012	House	Simon Lawson	Guest; Episode "The C-Word"	
2012	Castle	Simon Westport	Guest; Episode "The Final Frontier"	
2014	The Exes	Ed Stevens	Guest; Episode "Bachelor Party"	
2014–2015	State of Affairs	Nick Vera	Recurring	
2014–2015	The Young and the Restless	Det. Mark Harding	Recurring	
2015	Criminal Minds	Congressman Benjamin Troy	Episode: "Rock Creek Park"	
2016	NCIS: New Orleans	David Tate	Episode: "Father's Day" (February 9, 2016)	
2016	The Bold and the Beautiful	Dr. Hayden	Guest; 1 episode (March 3, 2016)	
2016	Mom	Derek	Episode "High-Tops and Brown Jacket" (October 27, 2016)	
2017	Grimm	Lt. Grossante	2 episodes	
2017	Lucifer	Ben Rivers	Guest; Episode "Mr. & Mrs. Mazikeen Smith"	
2017	SEAL Team	Pete Green	Episode "The Spinning Wheel"	
2024	NCIS	Eric Webb (Former NCIS Agent now CIA)	Guest; Episode "Lifeline"	
2025–2026	General Hospital	Jack Brennan	Contract Role (185 Episodes)	

=== Video games ===
Year	Title	Role	Notes	Ref.
2017	Hidden Agenda	Sergeant Noah Riggs	Voice	
2022	Horizon: Forbidden West	Fashav	Voice	
