= Elizabeth Tulloch =

American actress

- Tulloch in 2024
- Born: Elizabeth Tulloch; January 19, 1981 (age 45); San Diego, California, U.S.
- Other name: Bitsie Tulloch
- Education: Fox Lane High School; Harvard University (A.B.)
- Occupation: Actress
- Years active: 2001–present
- Known for: Grimm; Superman & Lois
- Spouse: David Giuntoli (m. 2017)
- Children: 1

Elizabeth Tulloch (born January 19, 1981), also known as Bitsie Tulloch, is an American actress. She is known for her roles as Juliette Silverton / Eve in the NBC television series Grimm (2011–2017), and as Lois Lane in the DC Comics superhero drama television series Superman & Lois (2021–2024), for which she has been nominated for a Saturn Award for Best Actress on Television twice.

== Early life ==
Born on January 19, 1981 in San Diego, California, Tulloch grew up in Spain, Uruguay, and Argentina, as well as Bedford, New York, where she attended Fox Lane High School. Tulloch goes by "Bitsie", which is not a contraction of her given name, Elizabeth, but an homage to her oddly nicknamed grandfather, a World War II bomber pilot, who was also involved in the 1961 Goldsboro B-52 crash.

When Tulloch began acting, she was credited as "Bitsie" and continued to be until 2017 when she decided to start using Elizabeth instead. Tulloch is of Scottish and Spanish ancestry. Her paternal grandmother's family is from Renfrewshire and her grandfather's family originated from the area around Kirkwall, both in Scotland. In an interview with BBC News, she reported that "we think the first Tulloch came to the US around 1880 and the Kerrs came in the early 1900s". After returning to the U.S., she went to middle and high school in Bedford, New York. Tulloch graduated magna cum laude from Harvard University with a double major in English and American Literature and Visual and Environmental Studies.

== Career ==
=== Film and theater ===
Tulloch's first acting credit was as R2-D2's girlfriend in R2-D2: Beneath the Dome, a mockumentary produced by George Lucas telling the life story of the fictional robot R2-D2 from the Star Wars film series. She starred as Sally in the premiere of Sam Forman's play, Quarterlife, which opened at the Pico Playhouse in March 2006. The Los Angeles Times wrote, "Superbly performed... the scene at the end of the play, between Sally (Bitsie Tulloch) and Jack (Clark Freeman), was heartbreaking and beautiful... The lead actress, Bitsie Tulloch, [was] absolutely brilliant."

She was in Lakeview Terrace directed by Neil LaBute, opposite Samuel L. Jackson, Kerry Washington, and Patrick Wilson, and worked with Barbara Hershey on a film called Uncross the Stars. In the fall of 2009 she filmed the romantic comedy Losing Control. Tulloch voiced one of the characters, a wolf called Sweets, in the animated film Alpha and Omega, which was released in September 2010.

Tulloch played the role of Norma, an actress in the 1920s starring in a silent movie with a veteran actor, in the award-winning movie The Artist with Jean Dujardin, John Goodman and James Cromwell, which was released by The Weinstein Company in November 2011, and won the 2012 Academy Award for Best Picture. She and the rest of the cast of the movie were nominated for a Critics' Choice Award for Best Ensemble Cast.

In 2012 she starred as one of the titular roles in independent film Caroline and Jackie, which she also co-produced. The film premiered at the Tribeca Film Festival in April 2012, and was released theatrically in May 2013.

Tulloch played Marilyn Sitzman, a witness to the Kennedy assassination, in the 2013 film Parkland, opposite Paul Giamatti and Billy Bob Thornton. The film was produced by Tom Hanks and Gary Goetzman of Playtone, and was released in 2013, to coincide with the 50th anniversary of John F. Kennedy's assassination.

=== Television ===
Tulloch has appeared on the television shows House, Cold Case, The West Wing, Moonlight, and Outlaw. In 2007, she filmed a role as a Dharma initiative scientist for the ABC series Lost, but her role was re-cast due to scheduling conflicts with quarterlife.

Tulloch played the lead role in Ed Zwick and Marshall Herskovitz's drama quarterlife, which premiered on NBC in early 2008. While the series was quickly pulled and moved to Bravo, Tulloch was hailed for her performance. The Los Angeles Times wrote: "She's the best realized of the bunch... Tulloch, who plays her, seems destined to be better known." She was often lauded as the "next" Claire Danes: "Will this be the first online show to create a real star? It looks likely: The gorgeous 26-year-old Tulloch clearly possesses Danes-like smarts and magnetism."

In 2009, Tulloch was one of the three leads in HBO's comedy pilot Washingtonienne, based on the book by Jessica Cutler. The pilot was produced by HBO and Sarah Jessica Parker. In early 2010, she filmed Most Likely to Succeed, a half-hour comedy pilot for Imagine Entertainment through the Fox network, and had a recurring role on NBC's Outlaw.

Tulloch was the female lead on the NBC series Grimm (2011–2017). She played the role of Juliette Silverton / Eve in the fantasy police procedural drama set in a world where characters inspired by Grimms' Fairy Tales exist. Tulloch's heritage and fluency with the Spanish language were written into the role.

Tulloch played Lois Lane in The CW Arrowverse crossover events "Elseworlds" in 2018 and "Crisis on Infinite Earths" in 2019. The executive producers described the character as "dogged, determined and brave". In 2021–2024, Tulloch and Tyler Hoechlin reprised their roles as Lois and Superman in the spin-off superhero drama television series Superman & Lois.

== Personal life ==
In December 2014, Tulloch confirmed she was in a relationship with her Grimm co-star David Giuntoli. In July 2016, she and Giuntoli revealed they became engaged in April 2016. They were married in June 2017. In October 2018, they confirmed that Tulloch was pregnant with their daughter, who was born in 2019.

During her time living and working in Portland, Oregon (where Grimm was filmed), Tulloch became a fan of the Portland Trail Blazers and was often seen attending games with her co-stars.

Tulloch and Giuntoli maintained two residences, including a 1920s remodeled Dutch Colonial in Portland and a 1920s Spanish house in Hollywood Hills. In January 2020, the family moved to Washington state to be closer to family and their work in Vancouver.

== Awards ==
Tulloch has been nominated for a Saturn Award for Best Actress on Television twice for Superman & Lois.

In early 2012, Tulloch was nominated by the Broadcast Film Critics Association Awards, commonly called the Critics' Choice Awards, for Best Ensemble Cast for The Artist.

Tulloch was nominated for a 28th Annual LA Weekly Theater Award for her performance in Sam Forman's play Quarterlife (March 2007). Quarterlife was an experimental sequence of 20-plus episodes which were originally intended to be released only on the internet, but its success led it to being picked up by NBC.

== Filmography ==
=== Film ===
Year	Title	Role	Notes
2001	R2-D2: Beneath the Dome	Bitsie Tullock	Mockumentary
2006	Life Is Short	Marcy	
2006	Sent	Angel	
2007	Ring Tone	Molly	
2008	Lakeview Terrace	Nadine	
2008	Uncross the Stars	Corrine	
2010	Alpha and Omega	Sweets	Voice role
2011	The Artist	Norma	
2011	Losing Control	Trudy	
2011	Riding the Pine	Trudy	
2012	Caroline and Jackie	Jackie	Title lead; Co-producer
2013	Parkland	Marilyn Sitzman	
2014	Dead Draw	Sarah Parker	
2015	Concussion	Keana Strzelczyk	
2015	Chronic	Lidia	
2017	We Love You, Sally Carmichael!	Tess Perkins	
2026	The Pirate King	Tess	Post-production
2026	An Enemy of the People	Dinah Brand	Post-production
2026	Wingmen		Producer; Pre-production
2026	Nickels †	Liz Monroe	Released 10/2/26

=== Television ===
Year	Title	Role	Notes
2004	The West Wing	Susan	Episode: "Third-Day Story"
2006	Cold Case	Tara Kozlowski	Episode: "The War at Home"
2007	lonelygirl15	Alex	Recurring role, 15 episodes
2008	Quarterlife	Dylan Krieger	Main role, 6 episodes
2008	House	Whitney	Episode: "Joy to the World"
2008	Moonlight	Celeste	Episode: "The Mortal Cure"
2009	Washingtonienne HBO	April	Television pilot
2010	Most Likely to Succeed FOX	Cooper	Television pilot
2010	Outlaw	Bethany Whitmore	Episode: "In Re: Tyler Banks"
2010	Tyranny	Alexandra Hubbard	Recurring role, 4 episodes
2011–2017	Grimm	Juliette Silverton / Eve	Main role; 119 episodes
2016	Portlandia	Taxi Customer	Episode: "TADA"
2018–2019	The Flash	Lois Lane	Episodes: "Elseworlds, Part 1" and "Crisis on Infinite Earths: Part Three"
2018–2019	Supergirl	Lois Lane	Episodes: "Elseworlds, Part 3" and "Crisis on Infinite Earths: Part One"
2019	Batwoman	Lois Lane	Episode: "Crisis on Infinite Earths: Part Two"
2020	Arrow	Lois Lane	Episode: "Crisis on Infinite Earths: Part Four"
2020	Legends of Tomorrow	Lois Lane	Episode: "Crisis on Infinite Earths: Part Five"
2021–2024	Superman & Lois	Lois Lane	Main role; 53 episodes
