= David Giuntoli =

American actor (born 1980)

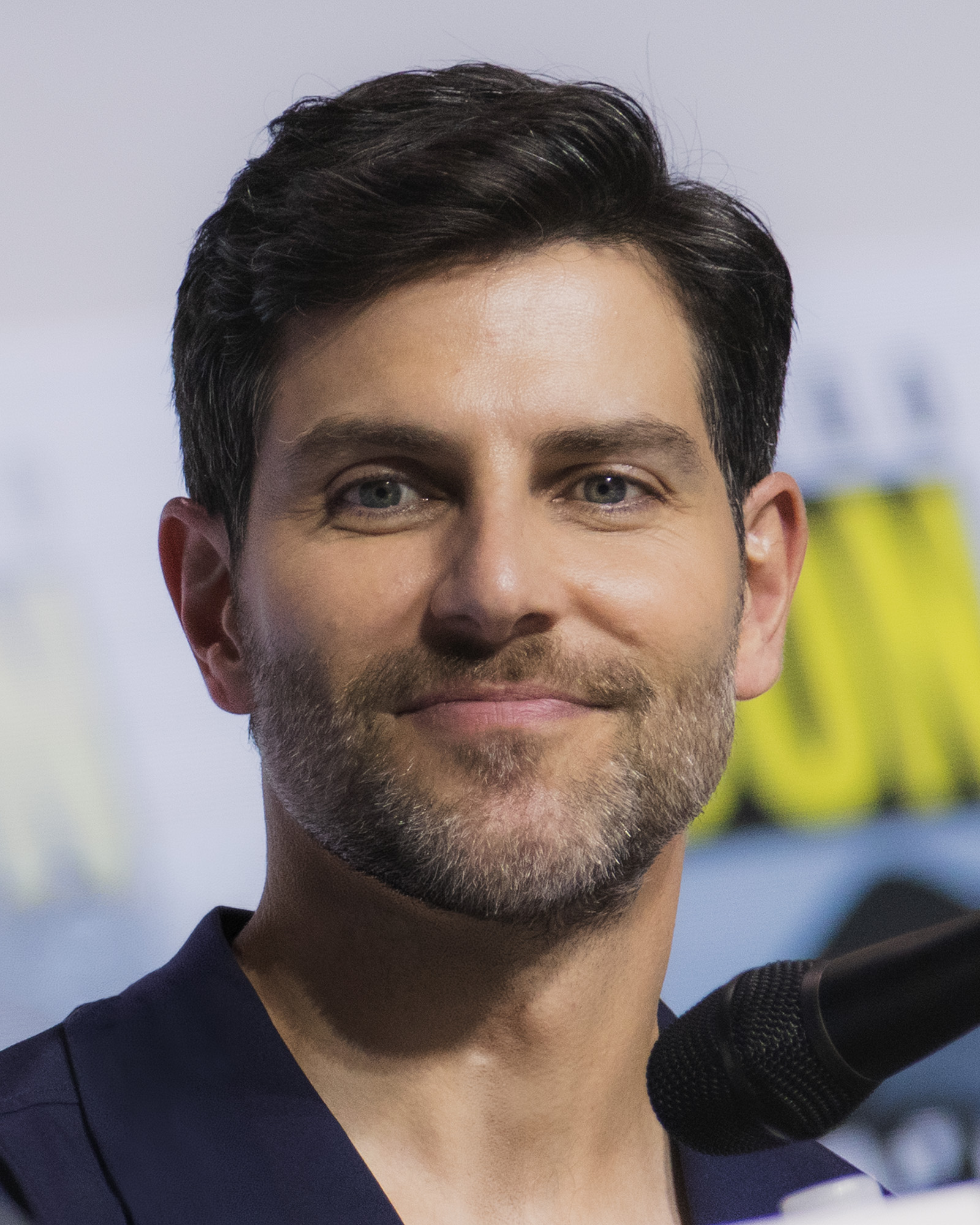
- Giuntoli at the 2026 San Diego Comic-Con
- Born: June 18, 1980 (age 46); Milwaukee, WI
- Citizenship: United States; Italy
- Education: Indiana University
- Occupation: Actor
- Years active: 2003–present
- Known for: Nick Burkhardt in Grimm; Eddie Saville in A Million Little Things
- Spouse: Elizabeth Tulloch (m. 2017)
- Children: 1

David Czarra Giuntoli (born June 18, 1980) is an American actor. He portrayed Det. Nick Burkhardt in the NBC supernatural drama Grimm (2011–2017), and Eddie Saville in the ABC drama series A Million Little Things (2018–2023). He has appeared in films such as 13 Hours: The Secret Soldiers of Benghazi (2016) and Buddymoon (2016).

== Early life ==
Giuntoli was born in Milwaukee, Wisconsin and he is the son of Mary and David Giuntoli. His father is of Italian descent while his mother is of Polish and German descent. He was raised in Huntleigh, a suburb of St. Louis, Missouri. After graduating from St. Louis University High School in 1998, he attended Indiana University Bloomington, earning a bachelor's degree in International Business and Finance in 2002.

Giuntoli returned to St. Louis after college. However, his heart was set on being an entertainer instead of a career in finance, something his family realized early on as he always enjoyed making people laugh from a young age. Reconnecting with his high school theater teacher, he began taking acting lessons locally.

== Career ==
His first career break came in 2003 when he was discovered by talent scouts for MTV and cast in the network's reality series Road Rules for its South Pacific season. The three-month adventure in the South Pacific, and a subsequent appearance on the seventh season of Real World/Road Rules Challenge provided the resources to pay off his college debt and further cemented his decision to pursue acting as a full-time career.

In 2007, he moved to Los Angeles to further pursue an acting career. There he studied under director and acting teacher Chris Fields before joining the Echo Theater Company. A long series of guest appearances on various TV series and TV movies followed, including Nip/Tuck, Veronica Mars, Grey's Anatomy, Ghost Whisperer, Privileged, Without a Trace, and Cold Case among others. Giuntoli was also in consideration for the title role of the relaunched Superman movie Man of Steel but was eventually beaten out by English actor Henry Cavill.

His first series regular role for television was in Grimm, which premiered in October 2011 and ran for six seasons and 123 episodes until March 31, 2017. He played the lead role of Nick Burkhardt, a Portland detective with supernatural abilities. In addition to his work on Grimm, Giuntoli was seen in 2012 in the motion picture Caroline and Jackie in a supporting role. He played the role of Scott Wickland, DS agent, in 13 Hours, directed by Michael Bay. In 2016, he played the lead role of David in the comedy film Buddymoon, a film that he created with Flula Borg and Alex Simmons.

He starred in the ABC series A Million Little Things, which aired for five seasons from 2018 to 2023.

== Personal life ==
He often rode his bicycle to the set of Grimm. During a 2012 break in production, Giuntoli visited an elephant orphanage in Kenya, adopting one of the animals.

Giuntoli married his Grimm co-star Elizabeth Tulloch in June 2017. They announced her pregnancy with their first child in 2018. Their daughter was born in 2019. In January 2020, the family moved to Washington to be closer to family and their work in Vancouver.

== Filmography ==
=== Film ===
Year	Title	Role	Notes
2009	Weather Girl	James	
2009	ComedyPOPS		Short film
2010	Camera Obscura	Walter	Short film
2010	Turn the Beat Around	Michael	
2011	6 Month Rule	Jared	
2012	Caroline and Jackie	Ryan	
2016	13 Hours: The Secret Soldiers of Benghazi	Scott Wickland	
2016	Buddymoon	David	Executive producer, co-writer
2021	Batman: Soul of the Dragon	Batman / Bruce Wayne	Voice
2023	Batman: The Doom That Came to Gotham	Batman / Bruce Wayne	Voice

=== Television ===
Year	Title	Role	Notes
2003	Road Rules: South Pacific	Contestant	
2003	Real World/Road Rules Challenge: The Gauntlet	Contestant	
2007	Veronica Mars	Sneed Batmen Guy	Episode: "Un-American Graffiti"
2007	Ghost Whisperer	Rick	Episode: "The Walk-in"
2008	Nip/Tuck	Evan	Episode: "August Walden"
2008	Grey's Anatomy	Todd	Episode: "The Becoming"
2008	Finish Line	Turner	TV film
2008	Eli Stone	Scott Colby	Episodes: "Waiting for That Day", "Should I Stay or Should I Go?"
2008	The Unit	Major Paul Grand	Episode: "Misled and Misguided"
2008	Without a Trace	Seth	Episode: "Push Comes to Shove"
2008	Cold Case	Dean London	Episode: "Wings"
2008–2009	Privileged	Jacob Cassidy	Recurring role; 4 episodes
2009	Crash	Brad	Episode: "The Pain Won't Stop"
2010	The Deep End	Jason Carpenter	Episodes: "An Innocent Man", "White Lies, Black Ties"
2010	Hot in Cleveland	Tyler	Episode: "Who's Your Mama?"
2010	Private Practice	Daniel	Episode: "In or Out"
2011	Love Bites	Jordan	Episode: "Firsts"
2011–2017	Grimm	Detective Nick Burkhardt	Main role, Directed Episode: "Oh Captain, My Captain"
2013	Key & Peele	Mack	Episode: "A Zombie Extra’s First Day on Set"
2018–2023	A Million Little Things	Eddie Saville	Main role
2024	Superman & Lois	Older Jonathan Kent	Episode: "It Went By So Fast" (uncredited); also director, episode: "Always My Hero"
2025	High Potential	Matthew Clark	Episodes: "Let's Play", "Pawns", "Checkmate"
