= Red menace =

Red Menace or red menace may refer to:

- Red Scare or Red Menace, a term used during the Cold War era to describe the Soviet Union or an "international communist conspiracy"
- Red Menace (New Mexico Lobos), a section in the stadium of the New Mexico Lobos
- Red Menace (comics)
- The Red Menace (film), an American film made in response to the HUAC's claim of pro-Soviet propaganda in Hollywood
- "Red Menace" (Grimm), an episode of Grimm
