= Nobody Knows the Trubel I've Seen =

- Grimm episode
- Episode no.: Season 3 Episode 19
- Directed by: Norberto Barba
- Written by: Jim Kouf; David Greenwalt
- Cinematography by: Marshall Adams
- Editing by: Chris Willingham
- Production code: 319
- Original air date: April 25, 2014
- Running time: 42 minutes

Guest appearances
- Alexis Denisof as Prince Viktor Chlodwig zu Schellendorf von Konigsburg; C. Thomas Howell as Weston Steward; Philip Anthony-Rodriguez as Marcus Rispoli

Episode chronology
← Previous "The Law of Sacrifice"	Next → "My Fair Wesen"
- Grimm season 3

"Nobody Knows the Trubel I've Seen" is the 19th episode of season 3 of the supernatural drama television series Grimm and the 62nd episode overall, which premiered on April 25, 2014, on the cable network NBC. The episode was written by series creators David Greenwalt and Jim Kouf, and was directed by Norberto Barba.

== Plot ==
Opening quote: "Nobody knows the trouble I've seen, nobody knows my sorrow."

A grieving and desperate Adalind tries to recruit Nick's help to find her missing daughter, not knowing that Kelly Burkhardt (Nick's mother) has taken the baby. When Adalind then finds out that Kelly has left town, with both Nick and Juliette refusing to help, Adalind angrily leaves the house, then violently attacks Sean Renard in his garage, telling him that she isn't sure if she will ever forgive him. She then asks for his help. When Renard tells her he doesn't know how, she warns him that sometime she will "stop crying". The next day she visits Monroe and Rosalee and tells them what happened with her daughter Diana. Monroe and Rosalee are forced to comfort and accommodate her in their living room.

When a mysterious young woman (Jacqueline Toboni) arrives in Portland, she is assaulted by two Wesen, a Lausenschlange and a Klaustreich, who appear to kill her. However, the young woman somehow escapes and uses the wesen's money to stay in a hotel room, where she frantically washes the attacker's blood from her scarred body. She then proceeds to steal a pair of sneakers from a store, attracting the attention of a female delinquent, who threatens her, revealing she is a Skalengeck. The two get in a fight, but the young killer defeats the Skalengeck and runs away from the scene.

Meanwhile, in Europe, Prince Viktor (Alexis Denisof) and Rispoli (Philip Anthony Rodriguez) are deducing what must have happened in Portland, when they lost Diana to the Resistance. Their talk is interrupted by the arrival of King Frederick, Renard and Eric's father, who wants to know which of his sons is the father of the baby, and who states that his granddaughter needs to be raised in the castle. Back in Portland, Adalind has a nightmare about Diana, and contacts Viktor, saying she is willing to do anything to see her baby again. Viktor sees this as an opportunity, and tells her that it's time to return the favor to the Grimm who stole her powers. Later, Adalind visits Renard, pretending to agree with the choice to send away her daughter. Weston Steward observes the two of them from a distance.

Nick and Hank are called to a crime scene, the same spot where the young lady was attacked and where the bodies of her attackers lie. The evidence indicates that there were three persons present. When they visit the relatives of one of the victims, Nick realizes that they were Wesen, and that only a dangerous killer would have taken down such criminals. As the investigation progresses, Nick finds that the suspect is a young lady, and wonders if she is Wesen, as well. With the help of Monroe, the detectives track the killer and find her most recent victim, the Skalengeck, who succumbs to her wounds. Near the hotel where the suspect is staying, Nick, Hank and Monroe find the girl and chase her. When Monroe woges in front of her, he recognizes her as a Grimm. Nick then realizes that she doesn't know anything about her true identity and powers, but since she refuses to talk, they take her into custody.

In the precinct, Nick and Hank find out that her name is Teresa Rubel and she has a long history of delinquency and minor crimes. After seeing some of Teresa's drawings of Wesen, Nick chooses to reveal to her, "the truth", by taking her to his aunt Marie's trailer. There, she reads the Grimm books and sees the weapons, and finally begins to learn who she is. Nick then takes Teresa to his home, where she introduces herself to Juliette by her nickname: "Trubel". (Pronounced "trouble")

== Reception ==
=== Ratings ===
The episode received a 1.2 18–49 ratings share and was watched by 4.39 million viewers, a marked decrease from the previous episode.

=== Critical reception ===
The episode was met with mixed to positive reviews.

Mary AnnSleasman of TV.com gave it a mixed review: "With just three episodes left in the season, Grimm seems no closer to resolving any of its marvelous messes. That's mostly why I'm concerned about Trubel—there's already so much going on in the stories that the show has been meticulously establishing all season. We didn't even get any Monrosalee wedding-planning this week! There's still time, though, and Grimm has always been pretty successful in the mad dash to the finish."

Nick McHatton from TV Fanatic gave the episode a rating of 3.5 stars of 5, adding that "Ultimately, this installment falls short of the stellar the standards set on Grimm Season 3. There's nothing much to Trubel yet and Adalind is mostly on a misery tour looking for Diana. With a few episode left in the season, I would be hoping momentum would begin to pick up rather than slow down."

Kevin McFarland of The A.V. Club rated the episode a B, stating, "For the first time in a while, there's a new recurring element of Grimm that I find greatly intriguing—and it's about damn time Nick encountered a Grimm outside of his family to figure out how others of his ilk experience the world.."
