= Once We Were Gods =

- Grimm episode
- Episode no.: Season 3 Episode 15
- Directed by: Steven DePaul
- Written by: Alan DiFiore
- Cinematography by: Marshall Adams
- Editing by: Ray Daniels III
- Production code: 315
- Original air date: March 14, 2014
- Running time: 42 minutes

Guest appearances
- Anne Dudek as Vera Gates; Alexis Denisof as Viktor Chlodwig zu Schellendorf von Konigsburg; Christian Lagadec as Sebastien; Robert Blanche as Sgt. Franco

Episode chronology
| ← Previous "Mommy Dearest" | Next → "The Show Must Go On" |
- Grimm season 3

"Once We Were Gods" is the 15th episode of season 3 of the supernatural drama television series Grimm and the 59th episode overall, which premiered on March 14, 2014, on the broadcast network NBC. The episode was written by Alan DiFiore, and was directed by Steven DePaul.

== Plot ==
Opening quote: "You shall not become corrupt, you shall not become putrid, you shall not become worms."

In Portland University, workmen are knocking down walls and find a secret room in one of them. In the room, they find an old Egyptian crate and they call Vera Gates (Anne Dudek), a professor, to study it. They open the crate to find the sarcophagus of Anubis, the God of mummification and afterlife. Meanwhile, Wu (Reggie Lee) continues to be haunted after his encounter with the Aswang.

Karl Herman (Richard Lee Jackson) and Bob Taylor (Rafael Miguel) learn of the sarcophagus and that night, sneak into the university to steal it. However, they are found by university security guards; Herman manages to kill one of them but Bob dies of his wounds. Nick (David Giuntoli) and Hank (Russell Hornsby) are later called to investigate the murder, finding symbols spray-painted on the wall, reading "I protect the dead".

Back in Austria, Sebastien (Christian Lagadec) is brought before prince Viktor (Alexis Denisof), who asks for the names of the people who helped Adalind (Claire Coffee) escape. Meisner (Damien Puckler) finds a baby in the woods and brings it back to the cabin but finds Adalind with the baby and that what he brought were just logs. Nick and Hank find that Herman is wanted for multiple crimes and is known for sneaking into the museums, as he is not in favor of them keeping the dead. They go to Monroe (Silas Weir Mitchell) and Rosalee (Bree Turner) to seek help, deducing that Herman is a Wesen that works for the Beati Paoli, a Wesen group that wants to preserve their culture.

Monroe wants to inform the Wesen Council about it but Rosalee is certain that they already know. Nick, Hank and Juliette (Bitsie Tulloch) find a reel film in the trailer showing a Grimm interrogating an Anubis Wesen. They deduce that Herman is an Anubis and wants to steal the mummy from the university. Nick and Hank warn Gates but she doesn't listen. Nick goes to Monroe's house and finds Alexander (Spencer Conway) there. Alexander explains that while the Council has no problems with the Beati Paoli, the members want Herman dead after murdering the security guard and want Nick to kill him as he is a Grimm. Nick refuses although Alexander warns that Herman could go after Gates at any moment.

Sebastien is tortured in a variety of methods and finally tells them where he left Adalind and Meisner, resulting in the Verrat agents setting off to find them in the woods. Renard (Sasha Roiz) calls Meisner and voices his concern that Sebastien hasn't been contacted and makes arrangements for them to leave the country. The Verrat agents find the cabin while Adalind, Meisner and the baby are escaping. Herman holds Gates at knifepoint and forces her to help him enter the university and lead him to the mummy. Nick and Hank arrive and attack Herman. Nick manages to defeat him and arrest him. Nick finds Alexander with the mummy in his car and confronts him about the lies but decides not to intervene. Nick, Hank, Monroe, Rosalee and Alexander hold a ceremony where they cremate the mummy. The episode ends as Wu is finally being let out of the hospital, believing everything was in his head.

== Reception ==
=== Viewers ===
The episode was viewed by 5.63 million people, earning a 1.6/5 in the 18-49 rating demographics on the Nielson ratings scale, ranking second on its timeslot and third for the night in the 18-49 demographics, behind 20/20, and Shark Tank. This was a slight decrease in viewership from the previous episode, which was watched by 5.65 million viewers with a 1.5/5. This means that 1.6 percent of all households with televisions watched the episode, while 5 percent of all households watching television at that time watched it. With DVR factoring in, the episode was watched by 8.17 million viewers with a 2.8 ratings share in the 18-49 demographics.

=== Critical reviews ===
"Once We Were Gods" received positive reviews. The A.V. Club's Kevin McFarland gave the episode a "B+" grade and wrote, "Maybe Grimm has a problem with establishing the scale of fright inflicted upon humans who see something they can't explain. Drew Wu hears stories from his grandmother in the Philippines about an Aswang, then has a deep personal connection to a case where he encounters one of the creatures, can't explain what he sees, and goes so far off the deep end he checks himself into a mental facility. But this week, an archaeology professor discovers that a mummified Anubis Wesen exists, hitting upon a professional discovery that could change her field forever, gets attacked by a living Wesen that goes woge in front of her — and Nick easily convinces her to chalk it up to stress at work."

Nick McHatton from TV Fanatic, gave a 4.0 star rating out of 5, stating: "The case this week is one of the more interesting ones with the Anubis, as we watched the gang discuss what to do with the Beati Pauli and Council. This installment really cements the fact that Nick, Monroe, Rosalee and Hank are their own team first; traditions come second when it comes to loyalty."

MaryAnn Sleasman from TV.com, wrote, "I love it when I issue demands and TV just obeys. However, I can't help but worry that he's eventually going to discover the (real) truth, at which point he's going to be pissed and probably resent Nick and Hank a little bit for letting him think he was crazy. It's okay, though. Wu has always been kind of a lighthearted character — one of the few on Grimm — and strapping this ticking time-bomb to him adds a mucho appreciated layer to the character and the potential stories involving him."
