= Cold Blooded (Grimm) =

- Grimm episode
- Episode no.: Season 3 Episode 7
- Directed by: Terrence O'Hara
- Written by: Thomas Ian Griffith
- Cinematography by: Marshall Adams
- Editing by: Chris Willingham
- Production code: 307
- Original air date: December 13, 2013
- Running time: 42 minutes

Guest appearances
- Alexis Denisof as Viktor Chlodwig zu Schellendorf von Konigsburg; Matthew Willig as Gregorek; Sharon Sachs as Dr. Harper; Christian Lagadec as Sebastien

Episode chronology
← Previous "Stories We Tell Our Young"	Next → "Twelve Days of Krampus"
- Grimm season 3

"Cold Blooded" is the seventh episode of the supernatural drama television series Grimm of season 3 and the 51st overall, which premiered on December 13, 2013, on the cable network NBC. The episode was written by Thomas Ian Griffith, and was directed by Terrence O'Hara. The episode aired alongside the next episode, Twelve Days of Krampus.

== Plot ==
Opening quote: "But for the pit confounders, let them go, and find as little mercy as they show!"

Adalind (Claire Coffee) meets with Prince Viktor Chlodwig zu Schellendorf von Konigsburg (Alexis Denisof), Eric's replacement. Viktor wants to find out who killed Eric and also says that he is Renard's (Sasha Roiz) cousin. Adalind tells him about Renard and also about Nick (David Giuntoli), identifying him as a Grimm. Back in Portland, a man named Gregorek (Matthew Willig) breaks into a house and begins to rob it. Someone enters the house and Gregorek kills him using his Wesen form.

When Nick and Hank (Russell Hornsby) investigate the scene, Nick thinks that the creature was a Siegbarste again. Meanwhile, a city worker enters the sewer to fix it when he hears sounds from inside and is killed by a creature. In Vienna, Renard (Sasha Roiz) and Meisner (Damien Puckler) meet with Sebastien (Christian Lagadec), who reveals that Viktor will meet with two men, Frenay and Tavitian, the former being the prime suspect of Eric's murder.

Nick and Hank are sent to investigate the murder and while inspecting the sewers, Wu (Reggie Lee) finds the worker's leg. In his backpack, many items from the robbed houses are revealed, linking the murderer to the man killed in the house. The examination also reveals that the marks belong to that of an alligator. Monroe (Silas Weir Mitchell) suggests that the killer is a Gelumcaedus. Along with Rosalee (Bree Turner) and Juliette (Bitsie Tulloch), Nick and Hank find that the Gelumcaedus are ancient creatures who protected the sewers.

Acquiring a map, Nick and Hank find that the sewers connect to all the robberies in the area. They travel to the sewers where they are attacked by a Gelumcaedus. Hank manages to knock him with a rifle and it woges back to his human form, revealed to be Gregorek, who says: "Dēcapitāre". In Vienna, Renard, Meisner and Sebastien arrive at the meeting with Frenay, who is executing a man for betraying them and tells Meisner to kill him. In the station, Nick and Hank try to make Gregorek confess but he refuses. Nick learns from Rosalee that the word "Dēcapitāre" means "he who decapitates" in Latin.

Hank goes home, calling Nick believing that there may have been one or two others involved in the killings, as some took place at the same time as others. Hank is then attacked by another Gelumcaedus and subdued and taken to the sewers. The man, Andre (Ernie Joseph) calls Nick and demands that he releases his brother, Gregorek or he will kill Hank. Nick accepts Andre's terms and releases Gregorek and takes him to the sewers. However, the brothers decide to kill them with the help of another Gelumcaedus. Nick frees Hank and battle the Gelumcaedus brothers, killing Andre and the other brother, and arrest Gregorek again. Adalind's room is revealed to be watched over by Viktor while Nick returns the armor to the trailer while uttering the word, "Dēcapitāre, I kind of like it".

== Reception ==
=== Viewers ===
Like the next episode, the episode was viewed by 4.88 million people, earning a 1.2/4 in the 18-49 rating demographics on the Nielson ratings scale, ranking second on its timeslot and sixth for the night in the 18-49 demographics, behind Last Man Standing, Blue Bloods, 20/20, Undercover Boss, and Shark Tank. This was a 23% decrease in viewership from the previous episode, which was watched by 6.32 million viewers with a 1.6/5. This means that 1.2 percent of all households with televisions watched the episode, while 4 percent of all households watching television at that time watched it. With DVR factoring in, the episode was watched by 8.22 million viewers with a 2.6 ratings share in the 18-49 demographics.

=== Critical reviews ===
"Cold Blooded" received positive reviews. The A.V. Club's Kevin McFarland gave the episode a "B+" grade and wrote, "The breadcrumb approach to revealing the larger story at play makes me far less interested in where the bigger story is going. At this rate, it will take the entire length of the series for anything significant to actually happen. The villains in these plots haven't been an immediate threat other than briefly at the midpoint and end of the second season, with Nick's confrontation with his captain and Eric's attempt to kidnap Nick back to Europe."

Nick McHatton from TV Fanatic, gave a 4.1 star rating out of 5, stating: "Grimm Season 3 Episode 7 really cemented an idea that's been very consistent this season: Nick is absolutely fearless. It might be because he's been to one side of death and come back again, or because his immediate social circle is in more danger now that his secret is out the he has a desire to make sure nothing can come back to haunt anyone."

MaryAnn Sleasman from TV.com, wrote, "Maybe it was the fact that most of the hype for Grimm's two-hour seasonal send-off focused so heavily on Krampus Claus that left me so underwhelmed with the first half of the finale, but whatever, because Krampus Claus delivered, and it's not that 'Cold Blooded' was bad, just that it wasn't anything special."
