= The Wild Hunt (Grimm) =

- Grimm episode
- Episode no.: Season 3 Episode 12
- Directed by: Rob Bailey
- Written by: Jim Kouf; David Greenwalt
- Cinematography by: Eliot Rockett
- Editing by: Ray Daniels III
- Production code: 312
- Original air date: January 24, 2014
- Running time: 42 minutes

Guest appearances
- Shohreh Aghdashloo as Stefania Vaduva Popescu; Chris Mulkey as Bart; Alexis Denisof as Viktor Chlodwig zu Schellendorf von Konigsburg; Dee Wallace as Alice; Christian Lagadec as Sebastien; Robert Blanche as Sgt. Franco

Episode chronology
← Previous "The Good Soldier"	Next → "Revelation"
- Grimm season 3

"The Wild Hunt" is the 12th episode of season 3 of the supernatural drama television series Grimm and the 56th episode overall, which premiered on January 24, 2014, on the cable network NBC. The episode was written by series creators Jim Kouf and David Greenwalt, and was directed by Rob Bailey.

== Plot ==
Opening quote: "Come back in the evening, I'll have the door locked to keep out the wild huntsmen."

After dinner in a restaurant, Monroe (Silas Weir Mitchell) shows Rosalee (Bree Turner) something in the clock: an engagement ring. He proposes to Rosalee and she accepts. Meanwhile, a police officer pursues a car in a chase and finally catches up with it but the driver is nowhere to be found and the officer is scalped by a creature.

Monroe and Rosalee begin discussing telling Monroe's parents about their engagement, something which worries Monroe as he didn't tell them she is a Fuchsbau.

In Vienna, Sebastien shows Stefania to Prince Viktor's room where he is seen observing Adalind on his laptop. Renard realizes this when Sebastien informs him of the happenings in the castle.

Rosalee is awakened by Monroe entering the spice shop. Monroe apologizes, and Rosalee says they need to talk. Rosalee is hesitant to get in the way of Monroe's family, but Monroe insists that if his parents won't accept them, he'd cut all ties from them if he had to.

A park ranger comes across Woden's campfire and finds the vehicle Woden stole ("The Wild Hunt") and another vehicle with Kansas license plates.

At the trailer, Monroe gets out the Siegbarste Gewehr while Nick reads one of the diaries about how to defeat the Woden . The diary suggests that they have a weakness like Samson, and if someone were to take their hair like they had taken the hair of others, it would weaken them. Nick grabs a knife for each of them and they check the blades. They are about to leave when a Woden attacks Monroe and knocks him to the ground. Nick shoots him multiple times, but the bullets do no good. A second Woden comes from behind Monroe, and Monroe turns and shoots him, but it does no good either. When a third, bigger Woden appears. Bart suddenly appears, saying, "Get off my son!" Nick gets a opportunity to cut Woden's hair with his knife, causing blood to spray from the strands, and it nearly instantly kills it. Distracted, Monroe is able to cut his Wildsheer hair. Nick runs up to the Woden Bart is fighting and grabs onto his hair long enough for Monroe to cut it too. Bart tells him that even if he is friends with a Grimm, he couldn't see him die. Bart says that if a Woden ever came back, then something really bad would follow, something that would change the world.

== Reception ==
=== Viewers ===
The episode was viewed by 5.88 million people, earning a 1.5/5 in the 18-49 rating demographics on the Nielson ratings scale, ranking second on its timeslot and fourth for the night in the 18-49 demographics, behind Bones, 20/20, and Shark Tank. This was a 2% increase in viewership from the previous episode, which was watched by 5.71 million viewers with a 1.5/5. This means that 1.5 percent of all households with televisions watched the episode, while 5 percent of all households watching television at that time watched it. With DVR factoring in, the episode was watched by 8.77 million viewers with a 2.6 ratings share in the 18-49 demographics.

=== Critical reviews ===
"The Wild Hunt" received positive reviews. The A.V. Club's Kevin McFarland gave the episode a "B" grade and wrote, "Well, that certainly wasn't the kind of cliffhanger I was expecting heading into the Olympics hiatus. Grimm has used a playful, comedic title card immediately after a cliffhanger before. I remember at least one of the season finales doing the same thing. The gleefully shocked reaction on the title card — 'OH %&$*,' basically — suited the situation in the last 30 seconds of the episode, with Monroe's parents going full woge to attack Nick and Monroe trying to peacefully intervene. But that shift clashed dramatically with the lengthy and excruciating confrontation between Rosalee and Monroe's parents. Last week, Monrosalee visited the Fuchsbau side in supporting plot, but tonight, the couple is the main focus, leading to a few squeal-worthy moments and then one painfully overwrought climactic event."

Nick McHatton from TV Fanatic, gave a 4.0 star rating out of 5, stating: "As all good Grimm episodes are likely to do, Grimm Season 3 Episode 12 ended with the 'To be continued...' card. The biggest development was Monroe finally popping the question to Rosalee! It was quite adorable and imaginative - proposing with a cuckoo clock - and it fit Monroe's character so well."

MaryAnn Sleasman from TV.com, wrote, "For a season that has reveled in contrasting the Wesen world with the human world and the modern Wesen world with the traditional one, I'm delighted to bring one of our main couples into the forefront of that storyline. At the end of the day, I fall into Monroe's mindset, where it's really none of Mom and Dad's *&^%$#@! business, but in the meantime, exploring Wesen culture and family dynamics on such a personal level has the potential to be really great."
