= Synchronicity (Grimm) =

- Grimm episode
- Episode no.: Season 3 Episode 17
- Directed by: David Solomon
- Story by: Michael Golamco
- Teleplay by: Michael Duggan; Michael Golamco
- Cinematography by: Marshall Adams
- Editing by: George Pilkinton
- Production code: 317
- Original air date: April 4, 2014
- Running time: 42 minutes

Guest appearances
- Alexis Denisof as Prince Viktor Chlodwig zu Schellendorf von Konigsburg; Philip Anthony-Rodriguez as Marcus Rispoli; Gloria Votsis as Young Kelly Burkhardt; Katharine Leonard as Young Marie Kessler; Damien Puckler as Martin Meisner; Mary Elizabeth Mastrantonio as Kelly Burkhardt

Episode chronology
← Previous "The Show Must Go On"	Next → "The Law of Sacrifice"
- Grimm season 3

"Synchronicity" is the 17th episode of season 3 of the supernatural drama television series Grimm and the 61st episode overall, which premiered on April 4, 2014, on the broadcast network NBC. The episode was written by Michael Duggan from a story by Duggan and Michael Golamco, and was directed by David Solomon.

== Plot ==
Opening quote: "In all chaos there is a cosmos, in all disorder a secret order."

Nick (David Giuntoli) tells Hank (Russell Hornsby) that he is unsure about attending Monroe's (Silas Weir Mitchell) wedding as the Wesen could recognize him as a Grimm and decides to tell him that he can't go because of the risk of getting exposed. In Switzerland, Adalind (Claire Coffee) and Meisner are still running from the Verrat.

Meisner leaves Adalind to go after the Verrat. However, Adalind is intercepted by the Verrat and taken to a car. Then, the Verrat agents are killed by Kelly (Mary Elizabeth Mastrantonio), who was told to save her. Meisner takes Adalind and Kelly to a plane that will take them to Portland but he stays behind and notifies Renard (Sasha Roiz) that Sebastien is dead and that he could go into hiding. Nick visits Monroe and Rosalee (Bree Turner) to tell them that he can't attend the wedding because of the risk of exposure. Monroe then suggests using sunglasses during the wedding as the Wesen can identify the Grimms from their eyes. They test the sunglasses and they state that it works.

Back in Vienna, Viktor (Alexis Denisof) is upset about Adalind's escape and has his associate Gregor (Gene Freedman) killed for his failure. He then has Marcus Rispoli (Philip Anthony-Rodriguez) named the new leader of the Verrat and they both deduce that Adalind must have returned to Portland. While on the plane, Kelly has flashbacks of when she had to leave Nick years ago. They land in Portland and steal a man's truck for safety as he threatens to call the police.

They arrive at Nick's house but Nick and Juliette (Bitsie Tulloch) instantly recognize her. A discussion ensues and it causes the baby to make a tremor and break things in the house. Despite her issues with Adalind, Juliette decides to take care of the baby in the room. While she takes care of the baby, Kelly explains that the baby is so powerful that if she falls into the wrong hands, she will do something evil. Adalind uses her powers to leave the house with the baby and escape in the man's car. Nick deduces that since Adalind mentioned Renard, she would go to his apartment. Adalind arrives at Renard's apartment and presents him with the baby, causing him to smile at the baby.

== Reception ==
=== Viewers ===
The episode was viewed by 4.89 million people, earning a 1.4/5 in the 18-49 rating demographics on the Nielson ratings scale, ranking third on its timeslot and second for the night in the 18-49 demographics, behind Last Man Standing, Hawaii Five-0, Blue Bloods, 20/20, and Shark Tank. This was a 15% decrease in viewership from the previous episode, which was watched by 5.71 million viewers with a 1.5/5. This means that 1.4 percent of all households with televisions watched the episode, while 5 percent of all households watching television at that time watched it. With DVR factoring in, the episode was watched by 7.31 million viewers with a 2.3 ratings share in the 18-49 demographics.

=== Critical reviews ===
"Synchronicity" received positive reviews. The A.V. Club's Kevin McFarland gave the episode a "B" grade and wrote, "One of the reasons Grimm needs its episodic structure is that right now, with only a handful of purely serialized installments, the show doesn't really know how to craft a parcel of plot into a compelling structure. There's some information from the past the audience didn't know, a tidbit about Wesen/Grimm interaction that fills in a gap that never seemed like a giant mystery, but mostly this is just an episode that gets all the pieces back to the one location they need to be in to bounce off each other. It serves that function well, with one of the more memorable confrontation scenes in the history of the series—and it doesn't even feature violence."

Nick McHatton from TV Fanatic, gave a 4.4 star rating out of 5, stating: "It's been three years in the making, but thanks to Grimm Season 3 Episode 17, all sides are beginning to come together in Portland as the royal baby makes her presence known. This installment was incredibly satisfying."

MaryAnn Sleasman from TV.com, wrote, "The two concurrent stories running through this episode are where the hour got its name: 'Synchronicity' is the apparent relationship between two or more events that otherwise have no connection. Monrosalee's nuptial arrangements comes off as quaint and cute, a domestic break in all the running and hiding and slaughtering of Royals, but when you look at it in the context of the rest of this season, their wedding-planning woes are just as high-stakes as Grimm's more intense storylines."
