= Blonde Ambition (disambiguation) =

Blonde Ambition is a 2007 romantic comedy film.

Blond Ambition or Blonde Ambition may also refer to:

- Blond Ambition World Tour, a 1990 concert tour by Madonna
- Blonde Ambition (novel), a 2004 novel written under the pseudonym Zoey Dean
- Blonde Ambition: The Untold Story Behind Anna Nicole Smith's Death, a 2007 biography by Rita Cosby
- "Blond Ambition" (Grimm), a 2014 television episode
