= Grimm season 3 =

Grimm
- Season 3
- Region 1 DVD cover art
- No. of episodes: 22

Release
- Original network: NBC
- Original release: October 25, 2013 – May 16, 2014

Season chronology
- ← Previous; Season 2 Next → Season 4

The third season of the NBC American supernatural drama series Grimm was announced on April 26, 2013. It consisted of 22 episodes. The series, created by David Greenwalt, Jim Kouf and Stephen Carpenter, follows a descendant of the Grimm line, Nick Burkhardt, as he deals with being a cop, and trying not to expose his secret as a Grimm.

== Cast ==
=== Main cast ===
- David Giuntoli as Nick Burkhardt
- Russell Hornsby as Hank Griffin
- Bitsie Tulloch as Juliette Silverton
- Silas Weir Mitchell as Monroe
- Sasha Roiz as Captain Sean Renard
- Reggie Lee as Sergeant Drew Wu
- Bree Turner as Rosalee Calvert
- Claire Coffee as Adalind Schade

=== Recurring cast ===
- Damien Puckler as Martin Meisner
- Christian Lagadec as Sebastien
- Alexis Denisof as Viktor Chlodwig zu Schellendorf von Konigsburg
- Shohreh Aghdashloo as Stefania Vaduva Popescu
- Jacqueline Toboni as Theresa "Trubel" Rubel
- Dee Wallace as Alice
- Chris Mulkey as Bart
- Danny Bruno as Bud Wurstner
- Laura Faye Smith as DeEtta Calvert
- Sharon Leal as Zuri Ellis
- Alicia Lagano as Alicia
- Mary Elizabeth Mastrantonio as Kelly Burkhardt
- Bryar Freed-Golden as Gloria Calvert

== Production ==
On April 26, 2013, NBC announced that the series had been renewed for a third season with a 22-episode order. Filming began on July 15 for an October 25 premiere.

== Episodes ==
| No. overall | No. in season | Title | Directed by | Written by | Original release date | Prod. code | US viewers (millions) |
|---|---|---|---|---|---|---|---|
| 45 | 1 | "The Ungrateful Dead" | Norberto Barba | Jim Kouf & David Greenwalt | October 25, 2013 | 301 | 6.15 |
The zombified Nick proves to be more than the Baron can handle, and crashes the plane while still over the Portland area, where he wreaks havoc at a bar. Adalind begins the trials to regain her powers. Williamson ether synthesis is used to treat the Portland zombies. Opening quote: "But if I stand at the sick person's feet, he is mine."
| 46 | 2 | "PTZD" | Eric Laneuville | Jim Kouf & David Greenwalt | November 1, 2013 | 302 | 4.96 |
After the attack at a local neighborhood house that Nick barges into; Rosalee manages to cure Nick. Later, the coverup over his rampage conflicts with his duty as a cop when he realizes a man died during the bar brawl and he was the cause of it. Opening quote: "It is not more surprising to be born twice than once; everything in nature is resurrection."
| 47 | 3 | "A Dish Best Served Cold" | Karen Gaviola | Rob Wright | November 8, 2013 | 303 | 4.88 |
Disturbing crime scenes resurrect an old feud; news spreads about a royal family member's demise; Rosalee and Monroe talk about their relationship. Opening quote: "'Tis Death's Park, where he breeds life to feed him. Cries of pain are music for his banquet."
| 48 | 4 | "One Night Stand" | Steven DePaul | Sean Calder | November 15, 2013 | 304 | 5.81 |
While investigating a drowning, Nick and Hank discover a group of water-bound Wesen; Rosalee unpacks at Monroe's; Renard comes to a realization about the royal baby. Opening quote: "More and more she grew to love human beings and wished that she could leave the sea and live among them."
| 49 | 5 | "El Cucuy" | John Behring | Michael Golamco | November 29, 2013 | 305 | 5.73 |
A serial killer is linked to the Latin American myth, El Cucuy. Juliette learns more about Nick's mother. Opening quote: "Duérmete niño, duérmete ya... Que viene el Coco y te comerá." ("Sleep child, sleep now... Or else the Bogeyman will come and eat you.")
| 50 | 6 | "Stories We Tell Our Young" | Aaron Lipstadt | Michael Duggan | December 6, 2013 | 306 | 6.32 |
A child kills a priest during an exorcism. The Wesen Council deem it an abomination and dispatch an assassin, while Juliette has an alternative theory. Opening quote: "We don't believe, we only fear."
| 51 | 7 | "Cold Blooded" | Terrence O'Hara | Thomas Ian Griffith | December 13, 2013 | 307 | 4.88 |
A deadly crime wave may be linked to a 100-year-old urban legend. Meanwhile, Adalind meets up with Eric's cousin, Prince Viktor (Alexis Denisof), who is seeking justice for his deceased kin, and Capt. Renard responds to the attempt on his life. Opening quote: "But for the pit confounders, let them go, and find as little mercy as they show!"
| 52 | 8 | "Twelve Days of Krampus" | Tawnia McKiernan | Dan E. Fesman | December 13, 2013 | 308 | 4.88 |
An old Wesen tale of an evil Santa Claus-like creature "Krampus", a South German word for pick, cramp (iron) may be linked to a case involving missing delinquent teens. Meanwhile, Monroe asks Juliet to help him surprise Rosalee for their first Christmas together; and Renard's tour of Europe brings him closer to Adalind. Opening quote: "O Christmas Tree, O Christmas Tree, How steadfast are your branches!"
| 53 | 9 | "Red Menace" | Allan Kroeker | Alan DiFiore | January 3, 2014 | 309 | 5.68 |
Nick and Hank investigate a Wesen with healing abilities that may do more harm than good for those around him. Juliette allows a friend, Alicia, to stay at her house after a recent issue with Alicia's husband. Hank puts the moves on his physical therapist. Captain Renard has a warning for Adalind. Opening quote: "To kill Koschei the Deathless, first you must find his soul, which is hidden in an egg, in a duck in a lead chest buried beneath an oak tree."
| 54 | 10 | "Eyes of the Beholder" | Peter Werner | Thomas Ian Griffith | January 10, 2014 | 310 | 5.33 |
Nick and Hank investigate what seems to be a Wesen gang feud, but things get very complicated when the only witness to the murder is the brother of the therapist Hank is flirting with. Meanwhile, Nick and Juliette finally decide to tell Juliette's friend, Alicia (a Fuchsbau), that Nick is a Grimm. Opening quote: "I am glad 'tis night, you do not look on me, for I am much ashamed of my exchange."
| 55 | 11 | "The Good Soldier" | Rashaad Ernesto Green | Rob Wright | January 17, 2014 | 311 | 5.71 |
Someone is murdering veterans who were accused of atrocious crimes during service, leading Nick and Hank to investigate evidence of a manticore involvement. Meanwhile, Rosalee and Monroe are visiting Rosalee's estranged mother and older sister. Meanwhile, Adalind is beginning to get her powers back. Opening quote: "Eye for eye, tooth for tooth, hand for hand, foot for foot."
| 56 | 12 | "The Wild Hunt" | Rob Bailey | Jim Kouf & David Greenwalt | January 24, 2014 | 312 | 5.88 |
While Monroe and Rosalee start making plans for the wedding and preparing to welcome Monroe's parents, Juliette tries to contact Nick's mother. Nick and Hank are called to investigate the deaths of several officers whose scalps were taken by the killer. Opening quote: "Come back in the evening, I'll have the door locked to keep out the wild huntsmen."
| 57 | 13 | "Revelation" | Terrence O'Hara | Jim Kouf & David Greenwalt | February 28, 2014 | 313 | 5.32 |
Monroe tries to convince his parents regarding his life choices and decisions. Juliette assists Nick on the wesen aspect of the cop-killing scalper case. Renard must contact Adalind to help keep her safe. Opening quote: "Still, after a short time the family's distress again worsened, and there was no relief anywhere in sight."
| 58 | 14 | "Mommy Dearest" | Norberto Barba | Brenna Kouf | March 7, 2014 | 314 | 5.65 |
When a dangerous wesen called an Aswang sets its sights on a childhood friend of Sgt. Wu, Nick and Hank must figure out how to deal with it as the investigation escalates. Adalind starts the preparations for a special delivery. Opening quote:"I am going off to a house and entering it like a snake... I will devour their babes and make their hearts ache."
| 59 | 15 | "Once We Were Gods" | Steven DePaul | Alan DiFiore | March 14, 2014 | 315 | 5.63 |
Nick and Hank find themselves in conflict with an organization called the Beati Paoli when an ancient Egyptian sarcophagus containing mummified wesen remains has been brought to the surface. This battle later gets heated up when the Wesen Council, unexpectedly, gets involved. Meanwhile, an ally of the resistance is compromised while protecting Adalind. Opening quote: "You shall not become corrupt, you shall not become putrid, you shall not become worms."
| 60 | 16 | "The Show Must Go On" | Paul A. Kaufman | Marc Gaffen & Kyle McVey | March 21, 2014 | 316 | 5.71 |
When a double homicide leads Nick and Hank to a strange wesen carnival called; "Carnival Metamorphosia", Monroe and Rosalee go under cover to find out what's going on behind the scenes. Sebastian makes a sacrifice on Adalind's and Meisner's behalf. Opening quote: "Under such conditions, whatever is evil in men's natures comes to the front."
| 61 | 17 | "Synchronicity" | David Solomon | Story by : Michael Duggan & Michael Golamco; Teleplay by : Michael Golamco | April 4, 2014 | 317 | 4.89 |
An unexpected ally arrives to make sure that Adalind and the baby get out of Europe safely; Rose and Monroe's wedding preparations remind Juliette and Nick of their past complications. Opening quote: "In all chaos there is a cosmos, in all disorder a secret order."
| 62 | 18 | "The Law of Sacrifice" | Terrence O'Hara | Story by : Michael Duggan & Michael Golamco; Teleplay by : Michael Duggan | April 11, 2014 | 318 | 4.73 |
The royals call in a corrupt FBI agent and two Verrat to find Adalind's baby and kill Adalind and Renard at the latter's place. When Prince Viktor shows up, Nick, his mother, and Sean devise a plan to end this standoff once and for all. After Adalind names her baby Diana, Sean separates Diana from Adalind and hands the baby to Viktor. That night, Nick, Sean, Hank, Monroe, and Kelly disguise as Laufer and retrieve Diana. The next day, Kelly relocates the baby to a remote secret hideout. Opening quote: "The Queen was terrified and offered the little man all the riches of the kingdom, if only he would leave the newborn child alone."
| 63 | 19 | "Nobody Knows the Trubel I've Seen" | Norberto Barba | Jim Kouf & David Greenwalt | April 25, 2014 | 319 | 4.39 |
When dangerous Wesen are found dead, its initially thought that they were killed by another Wesen. But turns out it's another Grimm, a young girl named Theresa "Trubel" Rubel (Jacqueline Toboni) who doesn't know what she is, but has a Grimm's fighting skills. Nick takes her under his wing and brings her to the trailer. Meanwhile an angry Adalind begins plotting revenge against Nick and Renard for giving her child Diana to the royals. Opening quote: "Nobody knows the trouble I've seen, nobody knows my sorrow."
| 64 | 20 | "My Fair Wesen" | Clark Mathis | Story by : Thomas Ian Griffith & Rob Wright; Teleplay by : Sean Calder | May 2, 2014 | 320 | 4.93 |
The exsanguinated body of a teenage girl known for shoplifting is discovered. Using the wound pattern Nick identifies the culprit as a Lebensauger, a Wesen species previously encountered in "The Hour of Death" (Season 2, episode 10). Seeing this as an opportunity for Trubel to get some field experience, Nick takes her along. When the investigation reveals that the girl belonged to a shoplifting ring and was held against her will, Trubel decides to join it on her own in an effort to bring the culprits of the murder down herself. Later that day, an elderly man arrives in Portland holding the last of the seven treasure keys that the Verrat want. Opening quote: "No longer a dark, gray bird, ugly and disagreeable to look at, but a graceful and beautiful swan."
| 65 | 21 | "The Inheritance" | Eric Laneuville | Dan E. Fesman | May 9, 2014 | 321 | 4.78 |
During a dinner with Rosalee, Monroe, Trubel and Juliette, Nick gets a strange call from a man named Josh Porter. His father, Rolek (seen at the end of the previous episode), is dying and wishes to pass on his many valuable Grimm possessions to Nick since he fears his disbelieving son will sell them to the highest bidder. Complications occur when the rogue FBI agent from "The Law of Sacrifice" returns leading a special task force from the Verrat called "Ahnenerbe", whose assignment is to retrieve any rare valuable occult and supernatural items. In this case, it's the Porter family's treasure key. While this all occurs, Adalind begins gathering ingredients for a doppelganger potion that allows her to temporarily disguise as Juliette. Opening quote: "'No,' said the King. I'd rather die than place you in such great danger as you must meet with in your journey."
| 66 | 22 | "Blond Ambition" | Norberto Barba | Jim Kouf & David Greenwalt | May 16, 2014 | 322 | 5.34 |
Monroe and Rosalee proceed with their marriage despite an incident with the dress, and everything seems to be going well. However, Adalind begins a new plot against Nick at Viktor's request, and it threatens to ruin the wedding as well as Nick and Juliette's relationship... and Nick's future as a Grimm. Disguised as Juliette in a romantic mood before the wedding, Adalind sexually transmits a spell that later disables Nick's Grimm abilities. Sean breaks into Catherine's storage room, finds out Adalind's plot, and obtains an antidote potion to reverse the spell on Nick. The disguised Adalind meets Trubel and leaves the house before the real Juliette returns. Trubel follows Adalind a few blocks into town, where Trubel sees Adalind board a taxi cab and the disguise expire inside. Meanwhile, Juliette returns from the hair salon and sees evidence of sexual activity in the bedroom. Trubel returns and sees the couple leave for the wedding. Sean comes over to Nick's house to deliver the potion, only to find Trubel there. She gives him the wedding address. As Sean heads out, the rogue FBI agent suddenly fires three shots at his torso. The shooter chases the lone witness up to her room, threatens to kill her, and woges. Upon his sight of her identity, the Grimm kicks the intruder out the room and beheads him with her machete. Opening quote: "Turn back, turn back, thou pretty bride, within this house thou must not abide. For here do evil things betide."

== Ratings ==
| No. in series | No. in season | Title | Air Date | Timeslot (ET) | Rating/Share 18-49 | Viewers (million) | DVR 18-49 | DVR Viewers (millions) | Total 18-49 | Total Viewers (millions) |
|---|---|---|---|---|---|---|---|---|---|---|
| 45 | 1 | The Ungrateful Dead | October 25, 2013 | Friday; 9:00 P.M. | 1.8/6 | 6.15 | 1.2 | 3.08 | 3.0 | 9.23 |
| 46 | 2 | PTZD | November 1, 2013 | Friday; 9:00 P.M. | 1.5/5 | 4.96 | 1.1 | 2.82 | 2.6 | 7.78 |
| 47 | 3 | A Dish Best Served Cold | November 8, 2013 | Friday; 9:00 P.M. | 1.3/4 | 4.88 | 1.2 | 3.11 | 2.5 | 7.99 |
| 48 | 4 | One Night Stand | November 15, 2013 | Friday; 9:00 P.M. | 1.6/5 | 5.81 | 1.0 | 2.68 | 2.6 | 8.49 |
| 49 | 5 | El Cucuy | November 29, 2013 | Friday; 9:00 P.M. | 1.3/4 | 5.73 | 1.3 | 2.99 | 2.6 | 8.72 |
| 50 | 6 | Stories We Tell Our Young | December 6, 2013 | Friday; 9:00 P.M. | 1.6/5 | 6.32 | 1.3 | 3.14 | 2.9 | 9.46 |
| 51 | 7 | Cold Blooded | December 13, 2013 | Friday; 9:00 P.M. | 1.2/4 | 4.88 | 1.4 | 3.34 | 2.6 | 8.22 |
| 52 | 8 | Twelve Days of Krampus | December 13, 2013 | Friday; 9:00 P.M. | 1.2/4 | 4.88 | 1.4 | 3.34 | 2.6 | 8.22 |
| 53 | 9 | Red Menace | January 3, 2014 | Friday; 9:00 P.M. | 1.5/4 | 5.68 | 1.2 | 3.03 | 2.7 | 8.71 |
| 54 | 10 | Eyes of the Beholder | January 10, 2014 | Friday; 9:00 P.M. | 1.3/4 | 5.33 | 1.1 | 2.62 | 2.4 | 7.95 |
| 55 | 11 | The Good Soldier | January 17, 2014 | Friday; 9:00 P.M. | 1.5/5 | 5.71 | 1.1 | 2.84 | 2.6 | 8.55 |
| 56 | 12 | The Wild Hunt | January 24, 2014 | Friday; 9:00 P.M. | 1.5/5 | 5.88 | 1.2 | 2.89 | 2.7 | 8.77 |
| 57 | 13 | Revelation | February 28, 2014 | Friday; 9:00 P.M. | 1.4/5 | 5.32 | 1.2 | 2.83 | 2.6 | 8.15 |
| 58 | 14 | Mommy Dearest | March 7, 2014 | Friday; 9:00 P.M. | 1.5/5 | 5.65 | 1.1 | 2.73 | 2.6 | 8.38 |
| 59 | 15 | Once We Were Gods | March 14, 2014 | Friday; 9:00 P.M. | 1.6/5 | 5.63 | 1.2 | 2.91 | 2.8 | 8.17 |
| 60 | 16 | The Show Must Go On | March 21, 2014 | Friday; 9:00 P.M. | 1.5/5 | 5.71 | 1.1 | 2.65 | 2.6 | 8.36 |
| 61 | 17 | Synchronicity | April 4, 2014 | Friday; 9:00 P.M. | 1.4/5 | 4.89 | 0.9 | 2.42 | 2.3 | 7.31 |
| 62 | 18 | The Law of Sacrifice | April 11, 2014 | Friday; 9:00 P.M. | 1.1/4 | 4.73 | 1.0 | 2.52 | 2.1 | 7.25 |
| 63 | 19 | Nobody Knows the Trubel I've Seen | April 25, 2014 | Friday; 9:00 P.M. | 1.2/4 | 4.39 | 1.1 | 2.42 | 2.3 | 7.73 |
| 64 | 20 | My Fair Wesen | May 2, 2014 | Friday; 9:00 P.M. | 1.3/5 | 4.93 | 1.1 | 2.79 | 2.4 | 7.72 |
| 65 | 21 | The Inheritance | May 9, 2014 | Friday; 9:00 P.M. | 1.3/4 | 4.78 | 1.0 | 2.52 | 2.3 | 7.30 |
| 66 | 22 | Blond Ambition | May 16, 2014 | Friday; 9:00 P.M. | 1.3/4 | 5.34 | 1.1 | 2.53 | 2.4 | 7.87 |

== DVD release ==
Grimm – The Complete Third Season
| Set Details | Special Features |
| 22 Episodes; 5-Disc Set; English (Dolby Digital 5.1 Surround); Audio Commentaries | Deleted Scenes; Gag Reel; Something Wesen This Way Comes: Inside Season 3 of Grimm; Double Take: Fighting a Hundjäger; Meltdown Digital Series; Love Is in the Air: Elegant Endeavors Digital Series; (Blu-ray Only) Grimm Guide |
Release Dates
| Region 1 | Region 2 |
| September 16, 2014 | October 20, 2014 |
