= The Show Must Go On (Grimm) =

- Grimm episode
- Episode no.: Season 3 Episode 16
- Directed by: Paul A. Kaufman
- Written by: Marc Gaffen; Kyle McVey
- Cinematography by: Eliot Rockett
- Editing by: Chris Willingham
- Production code: 316
- Original air date: March 21, 2014
- Running time: 42 minutes

Guest appearances
- Sam Witwer as Max Robbins; Carlo Rota as Hedig; Alexis Denisof as Viktor Chlodwig zu Schellendorf von Konigsburg; Chryssie Whitehead as Genvieve; Christian Lagadec as Sebastien; Damien Puckler as Martin Meisner

Episode chronology
← Previous "Once We Were Gods"	Next → "Synchronicity"
- Grimm season 3

"The Show Must Go On" is the 16th episode of season 3 of the supernatural drama television series Grimm and the 60th episode overall, which premiered on March 21, 2014, on the broadcast network NBC. The episode was written by Marc Gaffen and Kyle McVey, and was directed by Paul A. Kaufman.

== Plot ==
Opening quote: "Under such conditions, whatever is evil in men's natures comes to the front."

At a carnival, a ringmaster named Hedig (Carlo Rota) is presenting to the public four Wesen that act as freaks, taking the excuse of magic. One of the Wesen, Max (Sam Witwer), who is also a Blutbad, leaves the carnival when two girls show up as they want to meet him. They invite him for drinks and although he is hesitant, he goes with them. The girls take him to their house and after discussion, he woges into a Blutbad and attacks them.

While attending a dinner with Monroe (Silas Weir Mitchell) and Rosalee (Bree Turner) with Juliette (Bitsie Tulloch), Nick (David Giuntoli) is asked by Monroe to be his best man in their wedding while Juliette is asked to be Rosalee's maid of honor and they both agree. However, later that night, Nick tells Juliette that he is concerned about attending the wedding as many Wesen will be attending and they will recognize him as a Grimm.

Wu (Reggie Lee) is finally in service after leaving the psychiatric hospital and Nick and Hank (Russell Hornsby) investigate the murder of the two girls, finding their tickets to the carnival. They go to the carnival and Nick and Hank discover the Wesen performers, wondering if the Wesen Council could intervene. Back in Europe, Adalind (Claire Coffee) and Meisner (Damien Puckler) continue fleeing from the Verrat and find Sebastien (Christian Lagadec) in a car, badly hurt. A Verrat agent arrives but Adalind uses her abilities to make him kill himself. Sebastian is given a gun and Adalind and Meisner flee from the scene in a car. Viktor (Alexis Denisof) and the Verrat arrive and Sebastien manages to kill most of them but Viktor. He refuses to say where they went and Viktor shoots him, killing him.

While Nick and Hank talk with Hedig, Max loses control of himself and attacks one of the performers, Genvieve (Chryssie Whitehead). Nick and Hank talk with Monroe and Rosalee. They explain that the Council does not intervene because the public believes the performers are using magic and illusion although some are against it for exploitation. However, this could also cause the "Umkippen", an act in which a Wesen has forced himself to woge so many times that they can lose control. Monroe and Rosalee decide to go to the carnival for an intervention, which they believe could help the Wesen. However, Rosalee is selected as the replacement for Genvieve for her Wesen part.

Meisner tells Adalind that he has a Resistance agent to take her back to Portland but he will remain in Vienna. While preparing herself, Rosalee discovers that Max is the most affected with the Umkippen, deducing he is the killer. Before the show, Max confronts Hedig, who woges into a Löwen and reveals himself to be the killer of the people who saw him woged. Having discovered new evidence, Nick and Hank interrupt the show to arrest Hedig. Max breaks out of his cage and begins an attack while Hedig escapes to a mirror maze to find the Wesen. The performers are tired of his treatment and a Dämonfeuer kills him. The episode ends as Monroe and Rosalee are preparing for bed when Rosalee appears wearing her costume, causing Monroe to howl.

== Reception ==
=== Viewers ===
The episode was viewed by 5.71 million people, earning a 1.5/5 in the 18-49 rating demographics on the Nielson ratings scale, ranking second on its timeslot and second for the night in the 18-49 demographics, behind Shark Tank. This was a 2% increase in viewership from the previous episode, which was watched by 5.63 million viewers with a 1.6/5. This means that 1.5 percent of all households with televisions watched the episode, while 5 percent of all households watching television at that time watched it. With DVR factoring in, the episode was watched by 8.36 million viewers with a 2.6 ratings share in the 18-49 demographics.

=== Critical reviews ===
"The Show Must Go On" received mixed-to-positive reviews. The A.V. Club's Kevin McFarland gave the episode a "C+" grade and wrote, "Grimm cycles through episodes like 'The Show Must Go On' every so often, that sidestep police investigations in favor of allowing a few of the New Scoobies to deal with the case at hand as they see fit outside of the formal legal system. And when that leaves room for Monrosalee to take charge, it's usually an issue of Wesen rights that serves as a mild allegory for disenfranchised or mistreated persons. The correlation between bestial beings and those that need to be rescued may not be the most sensitive parallel, but it allows Grimm to leave Nick and Hank somewhat in the background, transition away from the repetitive structure of Nick/Hank/Wu at a crime scene followed by a trip to the Magic Airstream, interrogation, and a final Wesen confrontation. Instead, Monroe and Rosalee take center stage."

Nick McHatton from TV Fanatic, gave a 3.8 star rating out of 5, stating: "The carnival lends itself well to Grimm's world because it answers one of the questions of Wesen woguing for money in a safe space. I think we've all wondered what would happen if Wesen set up their own little shop of horrors to have some fun and make some cash."

MaryAnn Sleasman from TV.com, wrote, "Sam Witwer and a Wesen carnival and Monrosalee wedding planning and twisted, cheeky use of Warren Zevon's 'Werewolves of London' — this episode of Grimm made me so happy, you guys. It didn't even really move the plot very far: Adalind is still running around in the woods, the circus storyline (though refreshingly different from the usual gloomy murder investigations) was wrapped up all neat and pretty, and as much as I want to doodle little hearts around Sam Witwer's face every time it appears on el television, I'm concerned about how Max the Blutbad was basically just a hairier version of Being Human's Aidan the Vampire."
