= Revelation (Grimm) =

- Grimm episode
- Episode no.: Season 3 Episode 13
- Directed by: Terrence O'Hara
- Written by: Jim Kouf; David Greenwalt
- Cinematography by: Marshall Adams
- Editing by: Chris Willingham
- Production code: 313
- Original air date: February 28, 2014
- Running time: 42 minutes

Guest appearances
- Shohreh Aghdashloo as Stefania Vaduva Popescu; Chris Mulkey as Bart; Alexis Denisof as Viktor Chlodwig zu Schellendorf von Konigsburg; Dee Wallace as Alice; Christian Lagadec as Sebastien

Episode chronology
← Previous "The Wild Hunt"	Next → "Mommy Dearest"
- Grimm season 3

"Revelation" is the 13th episode of season 3 of the supernatural drama television series Grimm and the 57th episode overall, which premiered on February 28, 2014, on the cable network NBC. The episode was written by series creators Jim Kouf and David Greenwalt, and was directed by Terrence O'Hara.

== Plot ==
Opening quote: "Still, after a short time the family's distress again worsened, and there was no relief anywhere in sight."

Nick (David Giuntoli) fights Monroe's (Silas Weir Mitchell) father. Monroe manages to stop the fight but his parents are now upset that their son has a friendship with a Grimm and leave. Monroe also tells Nick to leave. Rosalee (Bree Turner) is now in the spice shop, crying, until Monroe arrives to help her and planning on cutting ties with his parents for not letting them stay together.

In Vienna, Stefania (Shohreh Aghdashloo) is revealed to have been working for Prince Viktor (Alexis Denisof) all along to get Adalind's (Claire Coffee) baby. Renard (Sasha Roiz) is notified of this by Sebastien (Christian Lagadec) and warns Adalind to go with Sebastien and Meisner (Damian Puckler). A park ranger is killed by Woden (Matt Lasky) and Juliette (Bitsie Tulloch) worries that Nick could be next as he is a police officer.

Meisner kills Viktor's guards to help Adalind get out of the room. They and Sebastien go on a car, with Meisner and Adalind leaving on foot into a forest to an old building belonging to Meisner where they will stay. Nick, Hank (Russell Hornsby) and Wu (Reggie Lee) are called to investigate the park ranger's death, deducing that Woden worked with someone else to retrieve the vehicles. They also find that the owner of one of the vehicles is a soldier who was A.W.O.L. Nick meets in Monroe's house, where both apologize to each other and find that a possible way to weaken Woden is by taking his hair, although this has never been confirmed.

When Nick and Monroe leave the trailer, they're attacked by Woden and two other Wildesheers. They're nearly killed when Bart helps them to cut their hair and kill them. While tending Adalind, she begins to have severe pain and tells Meisner that the baby is coming. The episode ends as Nick, Juliette, Monroe, Bart, Alice and Rosalee dine together although there continues to be tension among them.

== Reception ==
=== Viewers ===
The episode was viewed by 5.32 million people, earning a 1.4/5 in the 18-49 rating demographics on the Nielson ratings scale, ranking third on its timeslot and fifth for the night in the 18-49 demographics, behind Blue Bloods, Hawaii Five-0, 20/20, and Shark Tank. This was a 10% decrease in viewership from the previous episode, which was watched by 5.88 million viewers with a 1.5/5. This means that 1.4 percent of all households with televisions watched the episode, while 5 percent of all households watching television at that time watched it. With DVR factoring in, the episode was watched by 8.15 million viewers with a 2.6 ratings share in the 18-49 demographics.

=== Critical reviews ===
"Revelation" received positive reviews. The A.V. Club's Kevin McFarland gave the episode an "A−" grade and wrote, "After last week's cliffhanger fizzled out in a matter of seconds at the beginning of this episode, I was skeptical of how the show would handle the fallout from the total meltdown of Monroe's family. His mother and father vehemently disapprove of Rosalee on Wesen species grounds, and then get an even bigger surprise when they find out their son is friends with a Grimm. The fight with Nick ends, and Monroe's parents leave in a huff, positively scandalized by their son. (Monroe's father Bart: 'I don't know what you two are doing here, but it's wrong.' Monroe's mother Alice: 'I don't even know who you are anymore'). But once those clichéd leanings toward disownment are gone, 'Revelation' turns into one of the best episodes of the season, meting out Nick's often one-sided relationship with Monroe, and Juliette's resurgence as an emotional companion to Rosalee. It's the second memorable two-parter after the first two episodes of the second season."

Nick McHatton from TV Fanatic, gave a 4.1 star rating out of 5, stating: "This is one of the few episodes that begs, and later shoves under the rug, the question of Nick's reliance on Monroe. Nick has the Grimm ancestry and ability to dish out beatings to out of line Wesen on a daily basis, but Nick has almost zero experience when it comes to Wesen world and culture."

MaryAnn Sleasman from TV.com, wrote, "'Revelation' has the distinction of being one of those episodes of Grimm — or any show, really — where a ton of big, serious, important stuff happens, yet while all the realness is going down, we're laughing because there's also a lot of understated and genuinely funny humor thrown into the mix. Like Nick brandishing a knife at dinner when the Wesen at the table started acting up."
