= My Fair Wesen =

- Grimm episode
- Episode no.: Season 3 Episode 20
- Directed by: Clark Mathis
- Story by: Thomas Ian Griffith; Rob Wright
- Teleplay by: Sean Calder
- Cinematography by: Eliot Rockett
- Editing by: George Pilkinton
- Production code: 320
- Original air date: May 2, 2014
- Running time: 42 minutes

Guest appearances
- Michael Graziadei as Ken; Karissa Lee Staples as Donna O'Hara

Episode chronology
← Previous "The Law of Sacrifice"	Next → "The Inheritance"
- Grimm season 3

"My Fair Wesen" is the 20th episode of season 3 of the supernatural drama television series Grimm and the 64th episode overall, which premiered on May 2, 2014, on the cable network NBC. The episode was written by Sean Calder from a story by Thomas Ian Griffith and Rob Wright, and was directed by Clark Mathis.

== Plot ==
Opening quote: "No longer a dark, gray bird, ugly and disagreeable to look at, but a graceful and beautiful swan."

Trubel (Jacqueline Toboni) is introduced to Juliette (Bitsie Tulloch) as yet another Grimm, much to her surprise and Nick (David Giuntoli) states that she will live with them for a short time in order to introduce her to the Wesen world.

In an upscale store, a group of women distract the clerks so they can steal clothes and jewelry. One of them, Cammy (Kiah Stern) almost gets caught then fails to meet them at their rendezvous point. The rest of the girls meet up at a warehouse with a smarmy, controlling guy named Ken (Michael Graziadei) who inspects the merchandise disapprovingly. Cammy eventually shows up there in a panic but Ken is upset at Cammy's late arrival (& for getting detected stealing previously), woges into a Lebensauger and kills her by sucking her blood dry, as the other three cower in silence.

Renard (Sasha Roiz) places Adalind (Claire Coffee) in a hotel suite for safety and at her plea, he decides to stay with her overnight.

Not feeling well with all the Wesen revelation and strange hospitality, Trubel decides to quietly leave, only to be stopped by Nick out on the porch, having anticipated her reaction. He claims that if she doesn't give his help a chance and runs off again, she could land up in jail for the murders she committed. This convinces her to stay and she returns to bed. Next morning he introduces Monroe (Silas Weir Mitchell) and Rosalee (Bree Turner) and gets them to proper woge to her to prove that she doesn't need to be afraid of every Wesen.

A couple discover Cammy's body in the woods. Nick and Hank (Russell Hornsby) go to investigate and decide to bring Trubel as a ride-along. Upon seeing the drained blood, distinctive bite mark and no razor used on the body, they decide to look for info/clues at the trailer. There, Hank finds that the characteristics belong to the Lebensauger and Nick remembers Ryan's case, a Wesen they've encountered before. They decide to check the last place where Cammy stayed but before leaving Trubel also finds an entry on a Siegbarste, a Wesen whom she claims killed her foster parents.

Meanwhile, Ken tells one of the girls, Donna (Karissa Lee Staples) to find a replacement for Cammy so as to complete "their little family".

Nick, Hank and Trubel arrive at the house where the owner introduces them to Megan (Mavil Avila), Cammy's roommate. Frustrated that Nick & Hank got no information, while later alone with her, Trubel threatens Megan, who's a Wesen, to reveal anything she knows about Cammy's whereabouts. Megan reveals that Cammy last saw Donna in a square downtown. They discuss with Renard that Donna may be looking for a replacement girl/thief. Meanwhile, Trubel talks with Wu (Reggie Lee) about not being comfortable with all the new experiences, causing him to remember the nightmares he experienced.

Adalind arrives at a storage unit to retrieve something that her mom left in her will and finds a book of spells, although the book won't open, seemingly magically sealed shut. In frustration she throws it through a mirror and accidentally cuts herself with a shard of glass but her blood drips on the book, sizzling and absorbed by the pages, that proves to be the key - causing it to open.

Nick, Hank and Trubel are watching over Donna but Trubel, in an attempt to solve the crime, rushes over to her feigning being a runaway beggar and successfully acquiring her attention then leaves with her. Donna takes Trubel to the girls and with Ken, who approves of her and tells them to give her a dress and makeover. Nick and Hank manage to trace down Donna's vehicle and arrive at the warehouse. Meanwhile, Ken has been attempting to have sex with Trubel, causing her to snap at him via a punch to the nose, which causes him to woge into his Wesen form. He is outraged that he's been brought a Grimm and pounces on her. Donna woges into another Lebensauger and tries to ambush her too, just as Hank drives the car into and through a wall, giving Trubel time to stab Donna in the neck. Ken tries to attack before Nick kills him with a few bullets to the torso. The other two cowering girls are rescued.

Later that night, Trubel tells Nick and Juliette that she knew she had stuffed up and that she would like to stay a bit longer to learn more. As the lights elsewhere in the house are turned out, Trubel is in bed, making notes about Lebensäuger in her book.

The final scene shows an elderly man coughing and holding one of the keys.

== Reception ==
=== Viewers ===
The episode was viewed by 4.93 million people, earning a 1.3/5 in the 18-49 rating demographics on the Nielson ratings scale, ranking second on its timeslot and fifth for the night in the 18-49 demographics, behind Shark Tank: Swimming With Sharks, Blue Bloods, 20/20, and Shark Tank. This was a 12% increase in viewership from the previous episode, which was watched by 4.39 million viewers with a 1.2/4. This means that 1.3 percent of all households with televisions watched the episode, while 5 percent of all households watching television at that time watched it. With DVR factoring in, the episode was watched by 7.72 million viewers with a 2.4 ratings share in the 18-49 demographics.

=== Critical reviews ===
"My Fair Wesen" received generally positive reviews. The A.V. Club's Kevin McFarland gave the episode a "B−" grade and wrote, "By introducing a completely new character that threw a wrench in every bit of the tenuous equilibrium Grimm built within the New Scoobies, there was hope for the show to jolt in a new, unexpected direction. But instead, almost everything followed easily predictable beats. Trubel followed Nick and Hank investigating a case; she got too involved in an effort to prove herself (however subconscious this urge may have been); Nick felt guilty over involving her too quickly in a case pattern that has grown routine for him and Hank; Trubel took her unintentional and illegal undercover work too far, forcing Nick and Hank to further cover up her involvement—and yet still Nick has to acknowledge her raw talent while begrudgingly admitting that she hasn't been afforded the same slight Grimm advantages he had, namely a family to help with emotional support when the seemingly impossible threatens to drive a person insane."

Nick McHatton from TV Fanatic, gave a 3.5 star rating out of 5, stating: "Only Nick knows the trouble Trubel sees - and he's determined to see her through this Grimm initiation period. But Grimm Season 3 Episode 20 demonstrates, helping Trubel is going to take some serious work."

MaryAnn Sleasman from TV.com, wrote, "If there'd been any doubt that Nick was attempting to tackle more than he could handle in adopting the latest stray to wander into Portland, 'My Fair Wesen' drove the point home with a series of mishaps courtesy of Trubel the Reluctant Grimm that kind of made me wonder how she's survived until now. It's not that Trubel isn't smart — she certainly is — but her rookie status in the world of Wesen and Grimm and her lack of common sense in the boring old muggle world made for some exchanges that were probably meant to be funny but mostly came off as, 'seriously?'"
