= PTZD =

- Grimm episode
- Episode no.: Season 3 Episode 2
- Directed by: Eric Laneuville
- Written by: Jim Kouf; David Greenwalt
- Cinematography by: Eliot Rockett
- Editing by: George Pilkinton
- Production code: 302
- Original air date: November 1, 2013
- Running time: 42 minutes

Guest appearances
- Shohreh Aghdashloo as Stefania Vaduva Popescu; Jay Karnes as Bauer

Episode chronology
← Previous "The Ungrateful Dead"	Next → "A Dish Best Served Cold"
- Grimm season 3

"PTZD" is the second episode of season 3 of the supernatural drama television series Grimm and the 46th episode overall, which premiered on November 1, 2013, on the cable network NBC. The episode was written by series creators Jim Kouf and David Greenwalt, and was directed by Eric Laneuville.

== Plot ==
Opening quote: "It is not more surprising to be born twice than once; everything in nature is resurrection."

The zombified Nick (David Giuntoli) locates a family in a house in the woods and goes after them. The family manages to enter the house as Nick slams the door to get inside. He manages to enter and attacks the father while the rest of the family hide.

Hank (Russell Hornsby) and Monroe (Silas Weir Mitchell) finally locate Nick in the house. They manage to prevent Nick from harming the family but they are being beaten by Nick so Hank is forced to throw a lamp at him to lure him outside. He and Monroe flee to a barn where they hide on the top of a hayloft and make a hole in the boards to make Nick fall on it. As Renard (Sasha Roiz), Rosalee (Bree Turner) and Juliette (Bitsie Tulloch) arrive, Nick wakes up and slaps Juliette before finally getting injected by the antidote. As they're going to take him out, the father has come to kill him but Renard and Hank manage to send him away.

In Vienna, Adalind (Claire Coffee) has gathered the dead poppies and puts them on Frau Pech's stomach and then stitching it and then a stream appears out of the body. Stefania (Shohreh Aghdashloo) then gives Adalind a jar where a substance is getting contained inside from Frau Pech's stomach. Later, under her instructions, Adalind rubs the substance on her stomach, causing an image of a skull before fading away.

In the station, Renard learns that Eric was killed by a car bomb after arriving in Vienna. He then contacts a man named Meisner (Damien Puckler), who was responsible for the bomb. Upon seeing that two detectives have the surveillance files on the fight in the bar, Renard steals it and keeps it on his desk. In the spice shop, Nick finally wakes up from his zombie condition but can't remember what happened during his period as a zombie. Seeing he attacked the bar, they convince him he wasn't controlling himself and Juliette suggests he goes home to rest.

Hank learns from Wu (Reggie Lee) that one of the men who attacked Nick died in the hospital after the incident. He confides with Renard that as he, Rosalee and Juliette were in the scene, they will be interrogated. They meet with them in the spice shop and agree on devising the same story and details, and decide not to tell Nick about the man killed. While sleeping with Nick, Juliette finds he is getting cold, his skin is turning gray and there's no heartbeat. She is about to call an ambulance when he wakes up, seemingly not realizing what happened.

After questioning Renard, the detectives go to interrogate Rosalee in the spice shop. They then leave to question Juliette in their house, revealing the killing to Nick. After the questioning ends and the detectives leave, Nick decides to turn himself in even if he wasn't controlling himself. He is stopped in the station by Hank, who states that they only hid the truth to protect him. Nick walks into the station and talks with Renard about it. Renard then shows him the footage that shows that the man was about to kill Nick before Nick beat him up. He is convinced by Renard to not turn himself in as the Royal family would want that.

== Reception ==
=== Viewers ===
The episode was viewed by 4.96 million people, earning a 1.5/5 in the 18-49 rating demographics on the Nielson ratings scale, ranking second on its timeslot and third for the night in the 18-49 demographics, behind 20/20, and Shark Tank. This was a 20% decrease in viewership from the previous episode, which was watched by 6.15 million viewers with a 1.8/6. This means that 1.5 percent of all households with televisions watched the episode, while 5 percent of all households watching television at that time watched it. With DVR factoring in, the episode was watched by 7.78 million viewers with a 2.6 ratings share in the 18-49 demographics.

=== Critical reviews ===
"PTZD" received positive reviews. The A.V. Club's Kevin McFarland gave the episode a "B+" grade and wrote, "Little improvements continue to signal that Grimm now has a firmer handle on its central cadre of characters and larger storytelling aims while eliminating the more uneven aspects of the show. It's a working ensemble with much stronger chemistry that can now undulate as conflicts arise, but uniting everyone other than Nick together as a team is an important step to delving into the supporting characters as much as the first two seasons focused on Nick's development and David Giuntoli's growing comfort in the role. Whether that will step down a notch when the main focus isn't on Nick's recovery and is instead on solving the case of the new scary Wesen in town remains to be seen. But 'PTZD' brought the first big story of the season down for an exciting landing without the same fate as the plane Nick was on in the premiere."

Nick McHatton from TV Fanatic, gave a 4.5 star rating out of 5, stating: "The ramifications of Nick's time as a member of the undead came quickly in Grimm Season 3 Episode 2, as everyone he cares about is now completely swept along in the cover up."
