= Eyes of the Beholder =

- Grimm episode
- Episode no.: Season 3 Episode 10
- Directed by: Peter Werner
- Written by: Thomas Ian Griffith
- Cinematography by: Eliot Rockett
- Editing by: Chris Willingham
- Production code: 310
- Original air date: January 10, 2014
- Running time: 42 minutes

Guest appearances
- Sharon Leal as Zuri Ellis; Alicia Lagano as Alicia; Dalpre Grayer as Jared Ellis; Gino Anthony Pesi as Dread

Episode chronology
← Previous "Red Menace"	Next → "The Good Soldier"
- Grimm season 3

"Eyes of the Beholder" is the tenth episode of season 3 of the supernatural drama television series Grimm and the 54th episode overall, which premiered on January 10, 2014, on the cable network NBC. The episode was written by Thomas Ian Griffith, and was directed by Peter Werner.

== Plot ==
Opening quote: "I am glad 'tis night, you do not look on me, for I am much ashamed of my exchange."

Juliette’s (Bitsie Tulloch) college roommate, Alicia (Alicia Lagano), leaves her abusive boyfriend, Joe (Tom Walton), and stays with Nick (David Giuntoli) and Juliette; none of them realize Joe is stalking her. While she is there, Nick realizes that Alicia is a Fuchsbau and tells Juliette. Juliette communicates to Alicia that she knows about the world of Wesen and that Alicia does not need to hide it from her, but Alicia denies knowing what Juliette is talking about.

Meanwhile, Nick and Hank (Russell Hornsby) investigate what seems to be a Wesen gang murder, with only one witness, Jared Ellis (Dalpre Grayer), who is the teenage brother of Hank’s physical therapist, Zuri, (Sharon Leal). The men who murdered the gang member discuss whether they should take care of the kid who saw them, but realize that Jared’s girlfriend was the waitress at the diner where the murder took place, so they decide to use her instead. When Hank and Nick talk with the murder victim’s girlfriend in the hospital, she refuses to talk with them, until she woges and realizes that Nick is a Grimm, and he tells her that he is there as a cop, but can come back as a Grimm, if she doesn’t help them. She tells them that it was another gang, and Nick and Hank go to ask Monroe (Silas Weir Mitchell) about the presence of Wesen street gangs. He knows nothing of them, but Rosalee (Bree Turner) does, as she used to buy drugs from them in her “dark period.”

Nick and Hank follow a lead from a red light camera that leads them to the car of Hank’s physical therapist, and they take her brother Jared into custody. When they talk to him, he is clearly terrified and refuses to talk to them, but the men stalk and grab Jared’s girlfriend, Joy (Meredith Adelaide). The gang members arrive at Jared’s apartment, but Zuri is on the phone with Hank and she cries for help. Zuri and Jared identify the men who came to the apartment, and are put into a safe house.

Juliette goes to talk with Rosalee about her concern that Alicia is not acknowledging what she is. Rosalee confides that Juliette doesn’t realize how special she, Nick, and Hank are that they do not judge “or want to cut our heads off.” Rosalee adds that she tried to hide what she was for a long time, as she was dealing with it. The next day as Alicia tells them that she has found a new apartment, Juliette tells her that Nick is a Grimm. She freaks out and as Nick is calming her down, Joe arrives and knocks Nick out and tries to drag Alicia away. Juliette beats Joe, and when Nick comes around and re-enters the fray, Joe says “You are a Grimm; don’t kill me.” To which he responds “I don’t think it is me you have to worry about.” Both Nick and Juliette tell Joe that he better never try to see Alicia again.

Later, the murderers lure Jared to Joy’s house, where we find out that Jared and Zuri are both Wesen, and Zuri kills the head of the Seattle gang of murderers. Hank tells Zuri he does not have a problem with her being Wesen, but she says that she does, and he leaves.

== Reception ==
=== Viewers ===
The episode was viewed by 5.33 million people, earning a 1.3/4 in the 18-49 rating demographics on the Nielson ratings scale, ranking third on its timeslot and seventh for the night in the 18-49 demographics, behind Bones, Last Man Standing, Blue Bloods, Hawaii Five-0, 20/20, and Shark Tank. This was a 7% decrease in viewership from the previous episode, which was watched by 5.68 million viewers with a 1.5/4. This means that 1.3 percent of all households with televisions watched the episode, while 4 percent of all households watching television at that time watched it. With DVR factoring in, the episode was watched by 7.95 million viewers with a 2.4 ratings share in the 18-49 demographics.

=== Critical reviews ===
"Eyes of the Beholder" received mixed to positive reviews. The A.V. Club's Kevin McFarland gave the episode a "C+" grade and wrote, "Nick and Hank seem to encounter a different Wesen every week, whether it's working with Renard and the outside world, or chasing down a culprit for a case introduced that week. Perhaps the show doesn't give that much indication of how time passes for these characters, and maybe, as I've posited before, Grimm simply doesn't show the more 'routine' cases the two detectives handle. But it sure seems like they're getting an awful lot of crimes involving Wesen concentrated in one area of investigation."

Nick McHatton from TV Fanatic, gave a 4.0 star rating out of 5, stating: "If there's one thing that I learned at the end of Grimm Season 3 Episode 10, it's this: Don't give Juliette a frying pan. Not since Rapunzel in Tangled have I witnessed someone mercilessly beat the bad guys to a pulp with one."

MaryAnn Sleasman from TV.com, wrote, "While 'Eyes of the Beholder' was certainly an improvement over last week's mid-season premiere, my Spidey-sense is starting to tingle in a rather uncomfortable way because we have yet to hit the sweet spot that the first half of Grimm's third season nailed consistently, week after week. It's like the writers decided to save all the mediocre episodes with the weird racial undertones for January, interrupting all the good stuff to get them out of the way now in hopes that maybe we'll forget about them when the plot heats up again later on."
