= Mommy Dearest (Grimm) =

- Grimm episode
- Episode no.: Season 3 Episode 14
- Directed by: Norberto Barba
- Written by: Brenna Kouf
- Cinematography by: Eliot Rockett
- Editing by: George Pilkinton
- Production code: 314
- Original air date: March 7, 2014
- Running time: 42 minutes

Guest appearances
- Freda Foh Shen as Lani Tomas; Alain Uy as Sam Tomas; Tess Paras as Dana Tomas; Robert Blanche as Sgt. Franco

Episode chronology
← Previous "Revelation"	Next → "Once We Were Gods"
- Grimm season 3

"Mommy Dearest" is the 14th episode of season 3 of the supernatural drama television series Grimm and the 58th episode overall, which premiered on March 7, 2014, on the broadcast network NBC. The episode was written by Brenna Kouf, and was directed by Norberto Barba.

== Plot ==
Opening quote: "I am going off to a house and entering it like a snake... I will devour their babes and make their hearts ache."

Meisner (Damien Puckler) aids Adalind (Claire Coffee) in giving birth to the baby, and also turns Adalind back into a Hexenbiest. Back in Portland, a creature follows a pregnant woman, Dana Tomas (Tess Paras), to her room and uses his extremely large tongue to poke into her belly button. Dana awakes and attempts to cut the creature's tongue before it flees and she falls back unconscious.

Wu (Reggie Lee) and Sgt. Franco (Robert Blanche) are called to the scene to investigate, whom Wu recognizes as friends that moved to Portland from the Philippines under his recommendation, so now feels guilty. Nick (David Giuntoli) and Hank (Russell Hornsby) are also called and while trying to regain consciousness, Dana whispers "Aswang". Dana's husband, Sam (Alain Uy) calls his brother in Manila to inform and question about the events. Then, he too woges into a creature similar to that which attacked his wife Dana before.

Meisner calls Renard (Sasha Roiz) for help after aiding Adalind, informing him that he has a baby daughter and making sure that they will leave Austria safely. Wu begins to reminisce about an old story he heard as a boy about a mythical creature - an "Aswang" - a monster from the Philippines that stalks pregnant woman and then eats their children. Large quantities of Valerian root is inexplicably found in Dana's system, who has recovered enough to leave the hospital to go home. Sam knows that his mother could be involved in the attack and confronts her in her hotel room. Lani (Freda Foh Shen) explains that if she doesn't kill the baby, she will die, but Sam does not listen and brushes her off, angering her. She insists it's Aswang tradition that first born grandsons are always sacrificed to extend the life of elderly grandmothers, and as her son he owes her; then pleads with him that she doesn't want to die. Still, he refuses and hands her a ticket back to Manila, stating that death is a natural progression of life, she must just accept it!

Nick, Hank, Monroe (Silas Weir Mitchell) and Rosalee (Bree Turner) find that the Aswang use their tongue to transmit the tranquilizing effects of the valerian root and siphon off the amniotic fluid - both of which can kill a foetus; but that only those with a familiar tie to the victim can successfully insert their tongue into the belly. They consider telling Wu the truth about the Wesen world but decide that he isn’t ready to learn it. That night, Lani breaks into the house, knocks Sam unconscious and goes after Dana, pretending to be there as a caregiver. Wu, standing guard outside, is surprised to see the creature (Lani) so swiftly climbing the tree & entering the house through the window for such an old lady. When he follows, he can't quite believe what he encounters again attacking/siphoning Dana. When he attempts to intervene, he's attacked by the Aswang. Nick and Hank arrive just in time to kill Lani with a shot to the head but Wu is now thoroughly shocked after seeing the creature transform back into Lani.

Wu checks himself into a psychiatric hospital after the experience. Nick and Hank visit him, and attempt to explain away things - that Lani had a history of aggressive violence, that Dana and the baby are safe, and he's therefore a hero. Not convinced, Wu nevertheless continues to have dreams and hallucinations of the Aswang attacking him.

== Reception ==
=== Viewers ===
The episode was viewed by 5.65 million people, earning a 1.5/5 in the 18-49 rating demographics on the Nielson ratings scale, ranking second on its timeslot and fourth for the night in the 18-49 demographics, behind Dateline NBC, 20/20, and Shark Tank. This was a 6% increase in viewership from the previous episode, which was watched by 5.32 million viewers with a 1.4/5. This means that 1.5 percent of all households with televisions watched the episode, while 5 percent of all households watching television at that time watched it. With DVR factoring in, the episode was watched by 8.38 million viewers with a 2.6 ratings share in the 18-49 demographics.

=== Critical reviews ===
"Mommy Dearest" received positive reviews. The A.V. Club's Kevin McFarland gave the episode a "B" grade and wrote, "Still, at this point I'm not sure that Grimm really needed an episode that focuses on Sgt. Wu, especially one where one of the big reveals about his character is that his first name is Drew. Sure, he's the one character on the show who has been there since the beginning that the show hasn't gone into detail about. But he's also the character on the show who doesn't know anything about Nick's life as a Grimm. He's the outsider, a necessary foil to the rest of the group, able to stand in not as a fool, but as a barometer for how people without a familiarity with the Wesen world would look at what Nick and Hank do."

Nick McHatton from TV Fanatic, gave a 4.5 star rating out of 5, stating: "Poor Sergeant Drew Wu. Just when it looks like he's going to be in on the Wesen secret in Grimm Season 3 Episode 14, his 'gateway Wesen' was an Aswang. You know, just your typical, average amniotic fluid sucking Wesen."

MaryAnn Sleasman from TV.com, wrote, "That was pretty grim, even for Grimm. First there was all the uncomfortable preggo-tummy torture and then Wu, OMG Wu. I just think it's a little messed up—maybe messed up in a good way, but only maybe — when the least traumatic thing that happens in an episode is that a lady-witch gives birth to a monster-baby in the middle of the woods."
