= Angela Gots =

American actress

- Born: Angela Maria Gots; New York City, New York, U.S.
- Occupation: Actress

Angela Gots is an American actress, best known for her roles in Molly's Game and Madam Secretary.

== Early life ==
Gots was born and raised in New York City. She attended Rodeph Sholom School.

== Filmography ==
=== Film ===
Year	Title	Role	Notes
2001	Alex in Wonder	Alex	
2004	Gorilla Gram	Elise	Short
2004	Blue Demon	Tanya	Video
2005	Black Dawn	Stazi	Video
2006	Riptide	Angie	Short
2009	Dark House	Brunette Woman	
2010	30 Is the New 12	Veronica	Short
2010	The Agency	Linda	Short
2011	Expulsion	Anna	Short
2012	Within	Sarah Barren	Short
2012	St George's Day	Ellie Collishaw	
2013	I Am Alive	Anna	Short
2013	Lady of RAGE	Nikki Blaze	Short
2013	Bare Knuckles	Carrie	
2013	Immigrant	Meela	
2014	Snapshot	Arianna Simmons	
2015	Love Bid	Ellen	Short
2015	Rock Story	Tara Kellog	
2017	Molly's Game	B	

=== Television ===
Year	Title	Role	Notes
2003	Judging Amy	Paulina Vestova	Episode: "The Long Goodbye"
2005–06	Sleeper Cell	Carli	5 episodes
2007	American Heiress	Danielle Hopkins	55 episodes
2007	Viva Laughlin	Carla	Episode: "What a Whale Wants"
2008	Terminator: The Sarah Connor Chronicles	Maria	Episode: "The Demon Hand"
2008	The L Word	Cammie/Shaun	5 episodes
2008	House	Spencer	Episode: "Lucky 13"
2009	Eleventh Hour	Lily Kessler	Episode: "Miracle"
2009	The Beast	Nadia	Episode: "Nadia"
2009	90210	Ms. Casey	4 episodes
2010	CSI: NY	Cassie Davis	Episode: "Uncertainty Rules"
2010	The Mentalist	Roxy	Episode: "Jolly Red Elf"
2010–11	Svetlana	Marina	10 episodes
2011	The Event	Alexandra	2 episodes
2012	Touch	Stacey	Episode: "Noosphere Rising"
2013	Bubala Please	Speed Date #2	Episode: "Finding a Jewish Girl"
2014	Match	Andrea	Episode: "Seer"
2014	Grimm	Larissa	Episode: "Red Menace"
2014	NCIS: New Orleans	Miriam Tarlow	Episode: "Chasing Ghosts"
2015	Madam Secretary	Maria Ostrov	4 episodes
2016	Bosch	Yelana	Episode: "Gone"
2017	Ice	Natalya	2 episodes
2017	Criminal Minds	Kate	Episode: "A Good Husband"
2017	The Night Shift	Elise Shaw	Episode: "Turbulence"
2019	Blindspot	Greta Smalls	Episode: "Frequently Recurring Struggle for Existence"

=== Video games ===
Year	Title	Role	Notes
2014	Call of Duty: Advanced Warfare	Ilona	Voice
