= The Inheritance (Grimm) =

- Grimm episode
- Episode no.: Season 3 Episode 21
- Directed by: Eric Laneuville
- Written by: Dan E. Fesman
- Cinematography by: Marshall Adams
- Editing by: Ray Daniels III
- Production code: 321
- Original air date: May 9, 2014
- Running time: 42 minutes

Guest appearances
- Sam Anderson as Rolek Porter; C. Thomas Howell as Weston Steward; Lucas Near-Verbrugghe as Josh Porter

Episode chronology
← Previous "My Fair Wesen"	Next → "Blond Ambition"
- Grimm season 3

"The Inheritance" is the 21st episode of season 3 of the supernatural drama television series Grimm and the 65th episode overall, which premiered on May 9, 2014, on the broadcast network NBC. The episode was written by Dan E. Fesman and was directed by Eric Laneuville.

== Plot ==
Opening quote: "'No,' said the King. I'd rather die than place you in such great danger as you must meet with in your journey."

Nick (David Giuntoli) and Juliette (Bitsie Tulloch) dine with Monroe (Silas Weir Mitchell) and Rosalee (Bree Turner), discussing the upcoming wedding, and let Trubel (Jacqueline Toboni) join them. Outside Nick's house, a man (Lucas Near-Verbrugghe) is watching them eating and calls the house. Juliette answers and the man replies that he needs to talk to Nick. Nick takes the call but the man hangs up, seeing he's busy.

The man goes back to a hotel, not knowing he is being watched by Agent Steward (C. Thomas Howell). He arrives at the room of his father, Rolek Porter (Sam Anderson), who is the elderly person seen in the last episode. Rolek sends his son, Josh, to inform Nick of a meeting. Suddenly, a Hundjäger enters the room and attacks Josh until Rolek impales him, killing him and shocking Josh. Rolek is certain that he was a Verrat agent but Josh continues to see just a paranoid person. They leave the room and drive to an abandoned building where Rolek possesses many Wesen weapons, intent on contacting Nick.

Adalind (Claire Coffee) looks to know Juliette's timing at work when Renard (Sasha Roiz) walks in. Renard then has Wu (Reggie Lee) to place surveillance on Adalind. He then shows Nick and Hank (Russell Hornsby) the body of the Verrat agent with marks recognizing him as a member of the Verrat Ahnenerbe, a division that wants to find any valuable objects and tells them to find the men in the room, identifying them as Rolek and Josh. Meanwhile, Josh arrives at Nick's home but finds Trubel instead. She calls Nick but he doesn't answer and she decides to go with Josh.

Josh takes Trubel to the building where Rolek shows her many Grimm weapons that belonged to his family for generations. He will die soon and needs to pass the weapons to Nick since he's the last known Grimm and Josh is not. However, he collapses and they're forced to take him to the hospital. Adalind arrives at Nick's house and retrieves some of Juliette's clothes and hair. She tries to leave when Renard appears, having had Wu track her down. Adalind uses her powers to knock Renard out and leaves the house.

Nick is finally contacted by Trubel, who informs him that Rolek has one of the keys and has to meet him. Nick arrives but Rolek dies before he can tell him the location of the key, which is hiding in his trunk. Steward, posing as a detective, arrives at the hospital with Verrat agents. Hank is attacked by the agents while watching over the trunk when Nick and Trubel arrive. They fight the agents until they escape. They retrieve the trunk and take it to Nick's house to find the key. The key is not in the trunk, but as Rolek was using a cane, Nick pries apart the cane and discovers the key. They unite Rolek's key with Nick's key and find the map that leads to Black Forest, Germany.

The episode ends as Adalind makes a spell with the clothes and the hair and using a hat, causes an enormous vapor to come out of the hat. She inhales the hat and then, she transforms into Juliette, managing to imitate her voice.

== Reception ==
=== Viewers ===
The episode was viewed by 4.78 million people, earning a 1.3/4 in the 18-49 rating demographics on the Nielson ratings scale, ranking third on its timeslot and fifth for the night in the 18-49 demographics, behind Hawaii Five-0, Blue Bloods, 20/20, and Shark Tank. This was a 4% decrease in viewership from the previous episode, which was watched by 4.93 million viewers with a 1.3/5. This means that 1.3 percent of all households with televisions watched the episode, while 4 percent of all households watching television at that time watched it. With DVR factoring in, the episode was watched by 7.30 million viewers with a 2.3 ratings share in the 18-49 demographics.

=== Critical reviews ===
"The Inheritance" received positive reviews. The A.V. Club's Kevin McFarland gave the episode a "B+" grade and wrote, "I've said it so many times that I sound like a broken record available in one of Portland's many used record shops, but Grimm has so many plates spinning right now in terms of potential plot avenues to wander down, from Adalind's child to the Fuchsbau coins (hopefully gone forever) to Trubel. But of all those threads, the hunt for keys, building the secret map of the Black Forest, and searching for some unknown powerful MacGuffin — that interests me most as a quest."

Nick McHatton from TV Fanatic, gave a 4.2 star rating out of 5, stating: "It's certainly a callback to the old Grimm days when they wandered around and actively saught [sic] after Wesen."

MaryAnn Sleasman from TV.com, wrote, "We've seen Nick and his associates targeted before, repeatedly, but this is the first time in awhile that Grimm has openly acknowledged the ease with which Nick can be found and his prominence in Grimm/Wesen circles — even with regard to individuals who've never actually interacted with him, or who are particularly active in this secret world."
