= One Night Stand (Grimm) =

- Grimm episode
- Episode no.: Season 3 Episode 4
- Directed by: Steven DePaul
- Written by: Sean Calder
- Cinematography by: Eliot Rockett
- Editing by: Chris Willingham
- Production code: 304
- Original air date: November 15, 2013
- Running time: 42 minutes

Guest appearances
- Michael Welch as Jake Barnes; Stephanie Nogueras as Elly Mahario; Brian McNamara as Abel Mahario; Derek Ray as Dominic; Sara Fletcher as Sarah Mahario; Christian Lagadec as Sebastien

Episode chronology
← Previous "A Dish Best Served Cold"	Next → "El Cucuy"
- Grimm season 3

"One Night Stand" is the fourth episode of the supernatural drama television series Grimm of season 3 and the 48th overall, which premiered on November 15, 2013, on the cable network NBC. The episode was written by Sean Calder, and was directed by Steven DePaul.

== Plot ==
Opening quote: "More and more she grew to love human beings and wished that she could leave the sea and live among them."

A group of teenagers, Jake Barnes (Michael Welch), Dan (Pritesh Shah), and Sarah (Sara Fletcher) and Anna Mahario (Lauren Luiz) are relaxing on a river. Sarah then finds that her sister, Elly (Stephanie Nogueras), who is in love with Jake, is spying on them and sends her off. Then, Dan is dragged in the river by a mysterious creature while Jake tries to help him. Elly manages to save Jake with a Wesen form but Dan drowns.

Nick (David Giuntoli) and Hank (Russell Hornsby) are notified by the sheriff that Dan's body was found and had claw marks, deducing he was dragged. While inspecting the zone where the murder happened, Nick finds Elly and chases her but she jumps in the sea and swims quickly. Renard (Sasha Roiz) is told by Sebastien (Christian Lagadec) that Adalind (Claire Coffee) was dealing with Frau Pech about the baby, which may have royal blood.

Nick and Hank go with Monroe (Silas Weir Mitchell) and Rosalee (Bree Turner), who just moved on the house. Rosalee thinks that the Wesen may be a Naiad, a mermaid-like Wesen. Tracking a signal from Jake's phone to a marina, Nick, Hank, Wu (Reggie Lee) and cops arrive at a boat owned by Abel (Brian McNamara), and find the phone in the house. Elly hides in the water as Sarah and Anna arrive, pretending that nothing happened. They arrest Sarah and Anna and after they leave, Abel confronts the neighbors Dominic (Derek Ray) and Jesse (Coltron James) as they are the real culprits. Dominic and Jesse decide to "cut" Elly and leave.

Unwilling to let his daughters go to jail, Abel confesses the murder of Dan. Although they know he's innocent, Nick and Hank use the confession to make Sarah and Anna reveal that Dominic and Jesse are the killers, as their old tradition would require them to take care of their children. Meanwhile, Jake returns to his apartment to find Elly, recognizing her as the woman who saved him. She then takes him to a pool and shows her swimming abilities to find and even when she's different, Jake is surprised. Just then, Dominic and Jesse knock him out and kidnap Elly.

Dominic and Jesse take Elly to the docks where they tie her to an anchor and throw her to the water. The cops arrive and using his PTZD abilities, Nick swims to the sea to rescue Elly while Hank holds off Dominic and Jesse. After saving Elly, Hank remarks to Nick that he spend a long time in the sea as his skin is pale. Juliette (Bitsie Tulloch) checks an e-mail sent to Nick from a known "M". In the station, Jake identifies Dominic and tells Nick and Hank that Elly is not human and that sounds crazy. They tell him everything is crazy in Portland.

== Reception ==
=== Viewers ===
The episode was viewed by 5.81 million people, earning a 1.6/5 in the 18-49 rating demographics on the Nielson ratings scale, ranking third on its timeslot and fourth for the night in the 18-49 demographics, behind Hawaii Five-0, Shark Tank, and Undercover Boss. This was a 19% increase in viewership from the previous episode, which was watched by 4.88 million viewers with a 1.3/4. This means that 1.6 percent of all households with televisions watched the episode, while 5 percent of all households watching television at that time watched it. With DVR factoring in, the episode was watched by 8.49 million viewers with a 2.6 ratings share in the 18-49 demographics.

=== Critical reviews ===
"One Night Stand" received positive reviews. The A.V. Club's Kevin McFarland gave the episode a "B" grade and wrote, "Though Grimm stumbles in broad strokes, occasionally it manages to win me over with a surprising attention to detail. The featured Wesen tonight is the Naiad, based on the water nymph of Greek myth—though the epigraph comes from Hans Christian Andersen's 'The Little Mermaid.' In Grimm's version of this creature, the males are sterile, and the women must mate in the water with other men in order to further the species of half-human Wesen. In essence, the men must care for children they cannot sire themselves. Putting aside the emasculating rage that inspires in the episode's villains, it took me a full 45 minutes to notice that the three Naiad daughters in the episode looked nothing alike: Sarah, a blonde, Anna a redhead, and Elly, a deaf brunette. That depth of backstory without calling direct attention is impressive, and touches like that make 'One Night Stand' an enjoyable episode in spite of some repetitive flaws."

Nick McHatton from TV Fanatic, gave a 4.2 star rating out of 5, stating: "There are some episodes of Grimm that tell so much procedural story it sometimes grows boring rather than compelling. Grimm Season 3 Episode 4 focused on a captivating tale with some very exciting serial elements layered throughout."

MaryAnn Sleasman from TV.com, wrote, "The third season of any TV series can often end up being the sweet spot; by that point, a show usually knows what it is, and what it wants to be. It's comfortable, but it's not old, tired, or overdone. There's still a lot to be explored. There are still new ideas to put to paper. Grimm is growing increasingly secure with embracing complicated and difficult ideas that go beyond a TV show. Real communities all over the world struggle with issues of identity, with balancing the needs and wants of a community versus the needs and wants of individuals. Assimilation can be a dirty word, but so can isolation."
