= Twelve Days of Krampus =

- Grimm episode
- Episode no.: Season 3 Episode 8
- Directed by: Tawnia McKiernan
- Written by: Dan E. Fesman
- Cinematography by: Eliot Rockett
- Editing by: George Pilkinton
- Production code: 308
- Original air date: December 13, 2013
- Running time: 42 minutes

Guest appearances
- Derek Mears as Krampus; Shane Coffey as Derrick Bryce; Bernhard Forcher as Hans Tavitian; Danny Bruno as Bud Wurstner; Christian Lagadec as Sebastien

Episode chronology
← Previous "Cold Blooded"	Next → "Red Menace"
- Grimm season 3

"Twelve Days of Krampus" is the eighth episode and midseason finale of season 3 of the supernatural drama television series Grimm and the 52nd episode overall, which premiered on December 13, 2013, on the cable network NBC. The episode was written by Dan E. Fesman, and was directed by Tawnia McKiernan. The episode aired alongside the previous episode, Cold Blooded.

== Plot ==
Opening quote: "O Christmas Tree, O Christmas Tree, How steadfast are your branches!"

During Christmas time, two teenagers named Derrick Bryce (Shane Coffey) and Quinn Baxter (Alex Mentzel) steal presents from a car. Suddenly, a person dressed as Santa calls them "naughty", revealing itself to be a horned creature and attacks Derrick while taking Quinn.

In Austria, Tavitian (Bernhard Forcher) kills Verrat members that seem to follow him. He arrives at a Resistance to meet with Renard (Sasha Roiz), Meisner (Damien Puckler), and Sebastien (Christian Lagadec). However, the members of the Resistance have doubts about Renard for his blood although he manages to convince them by telling them he has a Grimm.

Nick (David Giuntoli), Hank (Russell Hornsby) and Wu (Reggie Lee) inspect the body of Derrick but Wu freaks when he finds that he is not dead and the attacker left a piece of coal. Meanwhile, Monroe (Silas Weir Mitchell) calls Juliette (Bitsie Tulloch) to help in redecorating the house, as a surprise for Rosalee (Bree Turner), as they are having their first Christmas together. During a visit to Derrick in the hospital, he gets freaked after he sees a Santa in the hallway.

Another teen steals a woman's presents and while checking on them, is attacked and subdued by the same horned Santa. A man watches the event but the creature does not attack him and again leaves a piece of coal. In Vienna, Renard and Meisner sneak in Adalind's hotel room and find her substance in the jar and leave a rose and a note for her, warning her to meet with him in a cafe and to watch out from the cameras. Monroe shows Rosalee the decorations in their house but Rosalee reveals that she does not like Christmas very much after her uncle and aunt died on a car accident on Christmas's Eve, hurting Monroe. The next morning, she wakes up to find that Monroe took away all the decorations.

While looking for the Santa responsible, Nick and Hank interrogate a Santa in the mall who turns out to be a Schakal. He panics when he finds that Nick is a Grimm and runs. Nick goes after him and tackles him while people film the event, reaching news reports. Nick and Hank asks Monroe about it and Monroe quickly deduces that the creature is Krampus. Krampus is a creature that takes the "naughty" people and subdues them to take them to a forest and then hangs them from the tallest tree as punishment for their actions. He also adds that when the Winter Solstice arrives, he will devour those children. To make matters worse, they're exactly on the Winter Solstice.

While discussing where is the tree, Bud (Danny Bruno), while denying Krampus' existence, deduces that the tree may be in Council Crest Park. They go to the forest and find the people in the tree but Krampus (Derek Mears) arrives and attacks Nick. Although he is stronger than Nick, Nick manages to knock him out. They debate what to do with him as the police won't have evidence linking him to the kidnappings and he could disappear for another year. To their surprise, they find that Krampus woges into a human form (Darius Pierce).

In the precinct, the human Krampus explains that he has his memory erased every Christmas and the day after the Winter Solstice, he wakes up with a Santa suit. To Nick's surprise, the human Krampus does not have knowledge of the Wesen world. Finding no other choice, Nick decides to inform the Wesen Council to handle the situation. Monroe returns to his house to find Rosalee asleep in the couch and finding beer and cigars instead of cookies and milk (this was the tradition her aunt made every Christmas), causing him to smile as he finds that she has finally celebrated Christmas.

== Reception ==
=== Viewers ===
Like the previous episode, the episode was viewed by 4.88 million people, earning a 1.2/4 in the 18-49 rating demographics on the Nielson ratings scale, ranking second on its timeslot and sixth for the night in the 18-49 demographics, behind Last Man Standing, Blue Bloods, 20/20, Undercover Boss, and Shark Tank. This was a 23% decrease in viewership from last week's episode, which was watched by 6.32 million viewers with a 1.6/5. This means that 1.2 percent of all households with televisions watched the episode, while 4 percent of all households watching television at that time watched it. With DVR factoring in, the episode was watched by 8.22 million viewers with a 2.6 ratings share in the 18-49 demographics.

=== Critical reviews ===
"Twelve Days of Krampus" received positive reviews. The A.V. Club's Kevin McFarland gave the episode a "B−" grade and wrote, "The good things to come out of this rather asinine conflict are the scenes between the men and the women. While they certainly don't pass the Bechdel Test, it puts Juliette in the position of helping Rosalee work through her emotions, and gives Monroe a chance to use Nick and Hank as a sounding board. I'm really surprised that Juliette, in the span of only eight episodes, has been largely rehabilitated from the anchor dragging the show down to only the weakest link in an improving cast."

Nick McHatton from TV Fanatic, gave a 4.1 star rating out of 5, stating: "Thank you, Grimm Season 3 Episode 8, for ruining Christmas for all of us. On the bright side, the legend of Krampus is awesome if you want your kids to behave (no wonder it's real), there are always alligators living in the sewers ready and willing to tear their limbs off to make sure they are fully traumatized."

MaryAnn Sleasman from TV.com, wrote, "'Twelve Days of Krampus' gave us the sort of excitement and teasing we expect from a long (or in Grimm's case, not really all that long) break. it also featured just a pinch of emotional compromise, which seems to be Grimm's thing this season. Also Zombie Superpowers Nick. And Demented Christmas Elf Monroe. And Dashing Leader of the Resistance Renard."
