= The Good Soldier (Grimm) =

- Grimm episode
- Episode no.: Season 3 Episode 11
- Directed by: Rashaad Ernesto Green
- Written by: Rob Wright
- Cinematography by: Marshall Adams
- Editing by: George Pilkinton
- Production code: 311
- Original air date: January 17, 2014
- Running time: 42 minutes

Guest appearances
- Emily Rios as Frankie Gonzales; Gonzalo Menendez as Jim McCabe; Kirk Acevedo as Ron Hurd

Episode chronology
← Previous "Eyes of the Beholder"	Next → "The Wild Hunt"
- Grimm season 3

"The Good Soldier" is the 11th episode of the supernatural drama television series Grimm of season 3 and the 55th overall, which premiered on January 17, 2014, on the cable network NBC. The episode was written by Rob Wright, and was directed by Rashaad Ernesto Green.

== Plot ==
Opening quote: "Eye for eye, tooth for tooth, hand for hand, foot for foot."

Frankie Gonzales sits in her car, clearly ill-at-ease. She looks out the car window at the VFW building and then starts cutting characters into her forearm with a knife. Someone is murdering veterans who were accused of atrocious crimes during service, leading Nick (David Giuntoli) and Hank (Russell Hornsby) to investigate evidence of a manticore involvement. Meanwhile, Rosalee (Bree Turner) and Monroe (Silas Weir Mitchell) are visiting Rosalee's estranged mother (Bryar Freed-Golden) and older sister (Laura Faye Smith). Meanwhile, Adalind (Claire Coffee) is beginning to get her powers back. Nick and Hank debrief Frankie, who looks at Troy Dodge's pieced-together confession, telling her what Desai had done. With justice doled out to her assaulters, Frankie leaves the precinct, finally having obtained closure

== Reception ==
=== Viewers ===
The episode was viewed by 5.71 million people, earning a 1.5/5 in the 18-49 rating demographics on the Nielson ratings scale, ranking third on its timeslot and seventh for the night in the 18-49 demographics, behind Bones, Dateline NBC, Hawaii Five-0, Undercover Boss, 20/20, and Shark Tank. This was a 7% increase in viewership from the previous episode, which was watched by 5.33 million viewers with a 1.3/4. This means that 1.5 percent of all households with televisions watched the episode, while 5 percent of all households watching television at that time watched it. With DVR factoring in, the episode was watched by 8.55 million viewers with a 2.6 ratings share in the 18-49 demographics.

=== Critical reviews ===
"The Good Soldier" received positive reviews. The A.V. Club's Kevin McFarland gave the episode a "B" grade and wrote, "Episodes like 'The Good Soldier' fall into my least favorite type of case structure on Grimm: episodic crime plots that don't reveal or advance anything about the central characters. Last week's episode spotlighted Hank and showed him getting back in the game while working on a case. But this week's plot didn't involve the Airstream until the final 10 minutes, instead featuring a didactic missive against military contractors given immunity from prosecution in American war zones. However, rarely has an episode of Grimm culminated in such an outright cool fight sequence that didn't involve the main characters. So as far as episodes like this go, 'The Good Soldier' is probably my favorite."

Nick McHatton from TV Fanatic, gave a 3.7 star rating out of 5, stating: "Manticores, looking like something I would fight against in a Final Fantasy game, came to Portland seeking vengeance in Grimm Season 3 Episode 11. The case with the manticores was pretty average. There's really not much to talk about."

MaryAnn Sleasman from TV.com, wrote, "'The Good Soldier' was a bit of a downer for everyone. Rosalee was ultimately forgiven by her family and welcomed back. Monroe got the 'hurt her and we'll kill you speech' (it's a classic) and surprisingly, the Blutbad prejudice was kept to a minimum. Their journey was traumatic like early-to-mid-'90s sisterhood movies: affirming in the end, but emotionally wringing. I'm looking at you, Boys on the Side."
