= Sex and a Girl =

2001 American comedy and drama film

- Directed by: Drew Ann Rosenberg
- Written by: Drew Ann Rosenberg
- Produced by: Robert Hays; John Walcutt
- Starring: Angela Gots; Robert Hays; Ellen Greene; Sean Flynn; Danny Masterson; Alison Lohman; Soleil Moon Frye; Lisa Brenner; Geneviève Bujold; Mary Kay Wulf; Tom Wright; Ivo Cutzarida; Ryan Freeman; John Walcutt
- Cinematography: Diane Farrington
- Edited by: Steven Nevius
- Release date: 9 March 2001
- Country: USA
- Language: English

Sex and a Girl (also known as Alex in Wonder) is a 2001 American comedy and drama film directed by Drew Ann Rosenberg. The film starring Angela Gots, Robert Hays, Ellen Greene, Sean Flynn, Danny Masterson and Alison Lohman in the lead roles.

== Cast ==
- Angela Gots as Alex
  - Eileen Boylan as Young Alex
- Robert Hays as Dan
- Ellen Greene as Clarice
- Sean Flynn as Scott
  - Kurt Alexander as Young Scott
- Danny Masterson as Patrick
- Alison Lohman as Camelia
- Soleil Moon Frye as Alissa
- Lisa Brenner as Jan
- Geneviève Bujold as Natalie
- Mary Kay Wulf as Mira
- Tom Wright as Sebastian
- Ivo Cutzarida as Armand
- Ryan Freeman as Jack
- John Walcutt as Mr. Jameson
- Denny Kirkwood as Tom
- Bryan Rasmussen as Tom's Father
- Matt Boren as Matt
- Paul Connor as Paul
- Jenna Mattison as Summer
- Stella Farentino as Gina
- Melinda Peterson as Mrs. Mahoney
- Jake Arnette as Skip
- Steve Schirripa as Steve
- David Dukes as Joseph Bloomfield
- John K. Anderson as John, Guy In Bar (credited as JK Anderson)
- Mark Neal as Bill, Guy In Bar
- Ron Jeremy as Master of Ceremonies (credited as Ron Hyatt)
- Meeno Peluce as Eric the Hippie
