= The Law of Sacrifice =

- Grimm episode
- Episode no.: Season 3 Episode 18
- Directed by: Terrence O'Hara
- Story by: Michael Duggan; Michael Golamco
- Teleplay by: Michael Duggan
- Cinematography by: Eliot Rockett
- Editing by: Ray Daniels III
- Production code: 318
- Original air date: April 11, 2014
- Running time: 42 minutes

Guest appearances
- Alexis Denisof as Prince Viktor Chlodwig zu Schellendorf von Konigsburg; C. Thomas Howell as Weston Steward; Philip Anthony-Rodriguez as Marcus Rispoli; Mary Elizabeth Mastrantonio as Kelly Burkhardt

Episode chronology
← Previous "Synchronicity"	Next → "Nobody Knows the Trubel I've Seen"
- Grimm season 3

"The Law of Sacrifice" is the 18th episode of season 3 of the supernatural drama television series Grimm and the 62nd episode overall, which premiered on April 11, 2014, on the cable network NBC. The episode was written by Michael Duggan from a story by Duggan and Michael Golamco, and was directed by Terrence O'Hara.

== Plot ==
Opening quote: "The Queen was terrified and offered the little man all the riches of the kingdom, if only he would leave the newborn child alone."

Prince Viktor (Alexis Denisof) has Rispoli (Philip Anthony-Rodriguez) dispatch corrupt FBI Agent and Verrat associate, Weston Steward (C. Thomas Howell) in Portland to retrieve the baby. Adalind (Claire Coffee) and Renard (Sasha Roiz) begin to discuss the baby when Renard is told that Nick (David Giuntoli) is entering the condo. Nick confronts Renard in the hallway but they decide to discuss the matter in his apartment.

While Nick speaks with Renard and Adalind, Kelly - Nick's mother - (Mary Elizabeth Mastrantonio) watches Agent Steward enter in the condo. Nick convinces Adalind to work with them and then leaves. Kelly knocks out Steward but two Verrat agents are going upstairs to get Adalind's baby. Nick warns them, and he and Kelly kill the Verrat agents. They then go with Renard, Adalind and the baby to Monroe's (Silas Weir Mitchell) house for safety. They decide not to tell Adalind of her mother's killing by Kelly in order to avoid any further conflict.

Nick, Renard and Kelly burst into Steward's house. Renard discovers that the last call to Steward was from Vienna and that Rispoli and Viktor are coming to Portland for the baby. The next day, Hank (Russell Hornsby) spies on the airport just as Viktor and Rispoli arrive at Portland and meet Steward. Steward asks them for permission to kill Renard. Later, Viktor visits Renard in the police station and warns that if they don't give them the baby in two hours, Renard, Adalind, and Renard's mother will be killed.

Police officers arrest Kelly at Monroe's house for the murder of Adalind's mother, shocking Adalind. Via phone Renard tells Adalind to come to the station to make a statement and bring the baby. At the station, she names the baby Diana and leaves the baby with Renard while she makes her statement. Adalind confronts Kelly in the room, who claims that she was justified to kill Adalind's mother to save Juliette (Bitsie Tulloch) and wants Adalind to understand she had to give up her son and that they have to sacrifice what they love the most. With this, Adalind realizes something is wrong. While they were talking, Renard takes the baby outside and gives it to Viktor. Adalind arrives too late. Renard claims that he did it to protect them, causing Adalind to woge and scream breaking the car's windows.

Viktor and Rispoli arrive at the airport and are intercepted at gunpoint by five Resistance members, demanding the baby. Viktor reluctantly gives them the baby and the Resistance members drive off in the limo. It is revealed they are Nick, Renard, Hank, Monroe, and Kelly. The episode ends as Kelly drives away, in a car Nick and Juliette bought, with Diana in the other seat, planning to put Diana in a safer place.

== Reception ==
=== Viewers ===
The episode was viewed by 4.73 million people, earning a 1.1/4 in the 18-49 rating demographics on the Nielson ratings scale, ranking third on its timeslot and seventh for the night in the 18-49 demographics, behind Kitchen Nightmares, Last Man Standing, Hawaii Five-0, Blue Bloods, 20/20, and Shark Tank. This was a 4% decrease in viewership from the previous episode, which was watched by 4.89 million viewers with a 1.4/5. This means that 1.1 percent of all households with televisions watched the episode, while 4 percent of all households watching television at that time watched it. With DVR factoring in, the episode was watched by 7.25 million viewers with a 2.1 ratings share in the 18-49 demographics.

=== Critical reviews ===
"The Law of Sacrifice" received positive reviews. The A.V. Club's Kevin McFarland gave the episode an "A−" grade and wrote, "When things do slow down for a beat, there's a great little scene between Kelly and Sean about Aunt Marie and the other thing the show seems to have completely forgotten about: the key. There's still a lot in the mythology of Grimm the show hasn't bothered to explain, instead just making things up as it goes along. But when it's as fiercely committed to making the task at hand the most important venture in the moment, it's much easier to forgive the narrative shortcomings of the show at large."

Nick McHatton from TV Fanatic, gave a 4.2 star rating out of 5, stating: "Au revoir, Diana, you creepy baby, you! In a truly shocking ending, Grimm Season 3 Episode 18 pulled the wool over our eyes as Captain Renard and the rest of the Nick's team end up ultimately helping Kelly hit the road with Diana."

MaryAnn Sleasman from TV.com, wrote, "'The Law of Sacrifice' had so many WTF moments and such a big, surprising pay-off that it felt, at times, like a season finale (and don't think I'm not worried about the fact that it felt like a finale even though we still have several episodes to go before summer vacation omg plz don't blow it, Grimm, this season has been so gooood)."
