= A Dish Best Served Cold =

- Grimm episode
- Episode no.: Season 3 Episode 3
- Directed by: Karen Gaviola
- Written by: Rob Wright
- Cinematography by: Marshall Adams
- Editing by: Casey Rohrs
- Production code: 303
- Original air date: November 8, 2013
- Running time: 42 minutes

Guest appearances
- Dan Bakkedahl as Graydon Ostler; Danny Bruno as Bud Wurstner; Christian Lagadec as Sebastien

Episode chronology
← Previous "PTZD"	Next → "One Night Stand"
- Grimm season 3

"A Dish Best Served Cold" is the third episode of season 3 of the supernatural drama television series Grimm and the 47th episode overall, which premiered on November 8, 2013, on the cable network NBC. The episode was written by Rob Wright, and was directed by Karen Gaviola.

== Plot ==
Opening quote: "'Tis Death's Park, where he breeds life to feed him. Cries of pain are music for his banquet."

Nick's (David Giuntoli) strength has been increasing after his zombification. On a date with Rosalee (Bree Turner), Monroe (Silas Weir Mitchell) proposes that she move in with him, to which she accepts. They also run into Sam (George Mount), an old friend of Monroe and his girlfriend Kimber (Ashley Whittaker). That night, a Blutbad runs in the woods and climbs onto a tree where his stomach is bloating and then explodes.

While Nick and Hank (Russell Hornsby) investigate the death, Renard (Sasha Roiz) receives a call from Sebastien (Christian Lagadec), his spy. He tells him that the police couldn't find anything on Eric's desk but he found a note that may lead to Frau Pech's location but finds Adalind (Claire Coffee) there. The next day, another victim is found in a tree with the same characteristics. Investigating the dead woman's car, Nick and Hank find that she and the Blutbad went to the same restaurant, Raven & Rose, before dying. They visit the restaurant to find the chef boss, Graydon Ostler (Dan Bakkedahl) yelling at his employees, all of them are Bauerschwein.

Juliette (Bitsie Tulloch) suggests to Nick that the victims could have died of gastric dilatation volvulus and Nick deduces that as the chefs were Bauerschwein and the victims were Blutbaden, these killings may be because of their old feud. Nick is finally moving out of Monroe's house and Monroe, Rosalee, Juliette, Hank and Bud (Danny Bruno) throw a party to celebrate. However, during the celebration, Monroe gets a call from Kimber, who states that Sam may have gone missing. Nick discovers that Sam is a Blutbad and also ate at Raven & Rose.

Rosalee finds that the disease is the result of the Völlige Verzweiflung, a mushroom that causes their victims to burst their insides out. If the mushroom is eaten raw, nothing will happen; but if the mushroom is cooked, it is a toxin to the Blutbaden. Sam is found by Nick, Hank and Monroe and his stomach explodes, killing him. Deducing Ostler is responsible, Monroe goes to kill him. Nick manages to get Ostler to confess when Monroe and a pack of Blutbaden arrive at the restaurant to kill him. Ostler signs a written confession in the precinct and Renard looks at it and says, "This little piggy went to jail."

== Reception ==
=== Viewers ===
The episode was viewed by 4.88 million people, earning a 1.3/4 in the 18-49 rating demographics on the Nielson ratings scale, ranking third on its timeslot and eight for the night in the 18-49 demographics, behind Blue Bloods, 20/20, Last Man Standing, Hawaii Five-0, MasterChef Junior, Undercover Boss, and Shark Tank. This was a 20% decrease in viewership from the previous episode, which was watched by 4.96 million viewers with a 1.5/5. This means that 1.3 percent of all households with televisions watched the episode, while 4 percent of all households watching television at that time watched it. With DVR factoring in, the episode was watched by 7.99 million viewers with a 2.5 ratings share in the 18-49 demographics.

=== Critical reviews ===
"A Dish Best Served Cold" received positive reviews. The A.V. Club's Phil Dyess-Nugent gave the episode a "B+" grade and wrote, "No show packs a more rich and varied sampler platter into its pre-credits sequence than Grimm. 'A Dish Best Served Cold' begins with Nick on a treadmill at the doctor's office. 'No matter how fast I had you running, your heart rate and your blood pressure barely moved,' says the doctor. 'Has there been any change in your diet or lifestyle recently?' That's the cue for a flashback of Nick getting gobbed in the face by a blowfish dude. While the 11-year-olds of every age in the audience are celebrating this reminder of one of the show's all-time greatest gross-outs, there's a cut to a restaurant scene that's a shipper's delight: Monroe telling Rosalee that Nick is moving out of his house, and delicately raising the possibility that she move in with him."

Nick McHatton from TV Fanatic, gave a 4.0 star rating out of 5, stating: "The age old rivalry between the Blutbad and the Bauerschwein continued on Grimm Season 3 Episode 3, and what better way for a Bauerchwein to get back at a Blutbad than by literally blowing them up from the inside out with a serious case of indigestion?"
