= Red Menace (New Mexico Lobos) =

Bleacher section

The Red Menace is the name of the bleacher section behind the North end zone in University Stadium, the home field of the New Mexico Lobos. It is known for having some of the most-rabid fans in the Mountain West Conference.

== History ==
Following the expansion and renovation of the north end of the stadium in 2001, which included a new bleacher section around the north end zone that held 5,700 additional fans. The idea was to establish a fanatical tradition at University Stadium. The idea of a group of fans sitting in that section, patterning it after the Cleveland Browns’ “Dawg Pound,” originated on Cherrysilver.com, a Web site for UNM athletics fans. The response was immediate, and soon, “The Red Menace” numbered in the hundreds. Lee Roy Lucero and fellow Cherrysilver.com operator Dom Zarella began working with the athletics department to sell tickets for the group at a discounted rate and they advertised it on their Web site.

After year three TheRedMenace.com started attending Lobo football practices and writing daily reports becoming the first media outlet in the state of New Mexico to take such an active interest in UNM football. Since that time TRM as it is affectionately known has published thousands of practice, game, and recruiting reports interviewing thousands of players.

== Notoriety ==
Red Menace fans carry a notorious reputation for their fondness of face-painting, colorful attire, and barking like a dog for approximately three straight hours. In addition, University of New Mexico football players participate in the famous “Lobo Leap”, where the players leap and celebrate with the fans following every game.

TheRedMenace.com is celebrating their 15th year in existence with Lee Roy Lucero still at the helm. His writers include Wes Henderson and Rudy Chavez.
