= Red Menace (Grimm) =

- Grimm episode
- Episode no.: Season 3 Episode 9
- Directed by: Allan Kroeker
- Written by: Alan DiFiore
- Cinematography by: Marshall Adams
- Editing by: Ray Daniels
- Production code: 309
- Original air date: January 3, 2014
- Running time: 42 minutes

Guest appearances
- Sharon Leal as Zuri Ellis; Mark Ivanir as Boris Myshkin; Alicia Lagano as Alicia; Aleksandra Kaniak as Olga Myshkin; Angela Gots as Larissa Komarov; Robert Blanche as Sgt. Franco

Episode chronology
← Previous "Twelve Days of Krampus"	Next → "Eyes of the Beholder"
- Grimm season 3

"Red Menace" is the ninth episode and midseason premiere of season 3 of the supernatural drama television series Grimm and the 53rd episode overall, which premiered on January 3, 2014, on the cable network NBC. The episode was written by Alan DiFiore, and was directed by Allan Kroeker.

== Plot ==
Opening quote: "To kill Koschei the Deathless, first you must find his soul, which is hidden in an egg, in a duck in a lead chest buried beneath an oak tree."

Juliette (Bitsie Tulloch) receives a call from a friend, Alicia (Alicia Lagano), who states that her husband has been abusing her. She tells her to come to Portland to discuss her marriage. While staying in the house, Nick sees that she is a Fuchsbau. In Vienna, Adalind (Claire Coffee) meets with Renard (Sasha Roiz), where he demands to know who is the father. She does not tell him but he warns her that her people are only interested in the baby and not to trust anyone.

Back in Portland, a healer named Boris Myshkin (Mark Ivanir) heals a woman from a pain she has been suffering. He then attends a Russian party where everyone is celebrating his actions for saving lives. He is attacked by a man named Alex Renko (Vladimir Tevlovski) and he woges into a transparent Wesen with green veins and uses them to poison Renko. Renko manages to escape but upon arriving at his hotel room, he begins to experience pain for the cumulative poison inside his body. Meanwhile, Hank (Russell Hornsby) has his final therapy with his physiotherapist, Zuri Ellis (Sharon Leal). He asks her on a date but she declines, wanting to keep things "professional".

Renard returns to Portland and tells Nick that they may be a threat for the Verrat. Nick, Hank and Wu (Reggie Lee) are sent to investigate a body found in the freezer of a restaurant. The body is identified as Ivan Markov, a waiter, and they find the scene of the fight between Boris and Renko. Nick, Hank and Renard decide to visit Boris as the footage shows that he acted like the attack never happened. They watch as Boris heals a boy and Nick sees his transparent hand and bones in the process. Using his Russian lessons, Renard tells Boris and his wife, Olga (Aleksandra Kaniak) that they can be trusted and offers to put a patrol on their house. Nick then tells them about what he saw and Renard deduces that Boris is a Koschie and decides to call people in Moscow that are expert on it.

Along with Monroe (Silas Weir Mitchell), Nick and Hank look in the trailer and find that Joseph Stalin used Wesen as bodyguards and Grigori Rasputin was a Koschie too. The diaries also reveal that these species are difficult to kill. Meanwhile, Renard finds out from an informant in Moscow that Boris was an assassin for the Federal Security Service and that everyone died from radioactive poisoning. Renko's condition is notified and Nick, Hank and Wu inspect the room. They find Markov's uniform and deduce that he can be connected to Boris. As they were close to him, the three of them must have a shower.

With the crowded evidence, Nick, Hank and Renard take Boris to the station. When he knows that Nick is a Grimm, he confesses that he attacked Renko in self-defense. They suggest that he leave the country as someone else will be sent to kill him and he agrees. At his home, he begins to make out with his maid, Larissa (Angela Gots) while drinking a vodka. She then pushes him when she finds that he didn't die. She has poisoned him as he killed her father and brother. She stabs Boris but, as she is leaving, Olga slits her throat just as Nick, Hank and Renard arrive. Larissa's wounds are grave but Boris decides to use his powers to heal her and dies doing it. Nick returns home with Juliette and Alicia and they receive a call from Joe, Alicia's husband. Nick and Juliette deny that she is with them but it's revealed that he is parked outside their house, and woges into a Klaustreich.

== Reception ==
=== Viewers ===
The episode was viewed by 5.68 million people, earning a 1.5/4 in the 18-49 rating demographics on the Nielson ratings scale, ranking first on its timeslot and fourth for the night in the 18-49 demographics, behind 20/20, Dateline NBC, and the 2014 Cotton Bowl. This was a 16% increase in viewership from the previous episode, which was watched by 4.88 million viewers with a 1.2/4. This means that 1.5 percent of all households with televisions watched the episode, while 4 percent of all households watching television at that time watched it. With DVR factoring in, the episode was watched by 8.71 million viewers with a 2.7 ratings share in the 18-49 demographics.

=== Critical reviews ===
"Red Menace" received positive reviews. The A.V. Club's Kevin McFarland gave the episode a "B" grade and wrote, "The last thing Grimm needs to add is more subplots. I haven't wondered at any point this season whether there should be more going on in the show, that the story feels too thin, or that there aren't enough characters across the Wesen world that seems to only consist of Portland and Vienna. But 'Red Menace' kicks of Grimm's 2014 by heaping on another multi-episode arc, where Juliette's longtime friend — who's never been seen or heard from before — Alicia finally leaves her violently abusive husband, and decamps to Portland."

Nick McHatton from TV Fanatic, gave a 3.3 star rating out of 5, stating: "Grimm was ready to ring in the new year with Grimm Season 3 Episode 9. But this installment, while having an interesting premise, ended up falling mostly flat."

MaryAnn Sleasman from TV.com, wrote, "All in all, Grimm's post-holiday return wasn't bad — it was just sort of rudimentary. We had our Wesen-of-the-week and the attached minor lesson about forgiveness. We hit, however briefly, on the strings left dangling at the end of the mid-season finale: Nick still has zombie powers, Adalind is still in Vienna; it's like someone ticked the plot points off of a checklist. I wanted more, but there's still a whole bunch of episodes left in this season to give us more. It's okay — I'll wait."
