= Blond Ambition (Grimm) =

- Grimm episode
- Episode no.: Season 3 Episode 22
- Directed by: Norberto Barba
- Written by: Jim Kouf; David Greenwalt
- Cinematography by: Marshall Adams
- Editing by: Ray Daniels III
- Production code: 322
- Original air date: May 16, 2014
- Running time: 42 minutes

Guest appearances
- Jacqueline Toboni as Theresa "Trubel" Rubel; Chris Mulkey as Bart; Dee Wallace as Alice; C. Thomas Howell as Weston Steward; Robert Blanche as Sgt. Franco; Danny Bruno as Bud Wurstner

Episode chronology
← Previous "The Inheritance"	Next → "Thanks for the Memories"
- Grimm season 3

"Blond Ambition" is the 22nd episode and season finale of season 3 of the supernatural drama television series Grimm and the 66th episode overall, which premiered on May 16, 2014, on the cable network NBC. The episode was written by series creators Jim Kouf and David Greenwalt and was directed by Norberto Barba.

== Plot ==
Opening quote: "Turn back, turn back, thou pretty bride, within this house thou must not abide. For here do evil things betide."

Monroe (Silas Weir Mitchell) and Rosalee (Bree Turner) begin their wedding rehearsal with Nick (David Giuntoli) acting as his best man and Juliette (Bitsie Tulloch) acting as her maid of honor. They also tell Nick to make sure to bring the sunglasses to the wedding in order to avoid being recognized as the Grimm. Meanwhile, Agent Steward (C. Thomas Howell) retrieves a fake passport for himself with the name "Walter Rathenau" in order to escape the country once the matter is solved.

Renard (Sasha Roiz) is visited by "Juliette" (Adalind in disguise) in his room. She claims that she needs to talk to him and although Renard says that she should stay away from him, she kisses him. She "apologizes" and leaves, stunning Renard. Juliette is then called by Adalind (Claire Coffee), who claims that Renard's potion with her could have returned, but Juliette is certain that she hasn't felt anything lately. Nick and Trubel (Jacqueline Toboni) move the trailer out of the storage unit into the woods. Meanwhile, DeEtta (Laura Faye Smith) gets drunk during the night, tries on, rips, and spills wine on the wedding dress, ruining it, and forcing Monroe's parents to pay for another at the last minute. Monroe and Rosalee don't get mad at her as they both hated the dress.

Renard calls Juliette to talk about what happened, confusing Juliette, who angrily hangs up. After a tip from Wu (Reggie Lee), Renard discovers the storage unit where Adalind made the potion and after unsuccessfully trying to get ahold of Nick, he makes a new potion with the ingredients. Nick arrives home and Adalind poses as Juliette to seduce him and they end up having sex. While Nick dresses for the wedding, Adalind leaves but runs into Trubel, and Adalind, as Juliette, coldly dismisses her. Trubel follows her and sees her shifting back to Adalind. The real Juliette arrives home and sees the clothes on the floor and thinks that Nick may have cheated on her. On the way to the wedding, Juliette confronts Nick about what happened and after realizing that Adalind knew Juliette wasn't going to be home for a time, they surmise that Nick had sex with Adalind.

Renard hurries to Nick's house to give him the antidote but only finds Trubel there. She describes the blonde woman to him and he realises it was Adalind. Trubel gives him the wedding ceremony address and as Renard leaves for the wedding, he is shot three times in the chest through the door, falling unconscious. The shooter is revealed to be Agent Steward, who sees Trubel, who flees to her room and closes the door just as he shoots. The bullet passes through the door grazing her temple. He breaks down the door, intent on killing Trubel, who grabs a machete and decapitates him. She then calls the police and an ambulance for Renard and then leaves to give the antidote to Nick.

As the wedding begins, Wu, Sgt. Franco (Robert Blanche) and officers arrive at the house to investigate. They find Steward's corpse and the fake passport and go upstairs to check the room for more evidence. Wu then discovers the Grimm book and opens it to reveal a Lausenschlange entry, reminding him of his previous nightmares with the Aswang. The wedding goes well and Monroe and Rosalee are officially pronounced husband and wife. However, Trubel arrives at the wedding with the antidote, causing the guests to woge when they discover she is a Grimm. Nick tries to save her from them and the antidote accidentally drops, breaking it as well as Nick's sunglasses.

Nick, Hank (Russell Hornsby), Monroe, Rosalee, Juliette and Trubel escape to a room and they discuss how Nick was unable to see the Wesen woged. Monroe woges in front of him and discovers that Nick has lost his powers and is no longer a Grimm. Nick, Hank, Juliette and Trubel escape in Renard's car while Renard is taken away by an ambulance, coughing blood. Adalind is revealed to be on a plane so she can get her daughter back. The season ends as Nick confirms to Trubel that he couldn't see the Wesen.

== Reception ==
=== Viewers ===
The episode was viewed by 5.34 million people, earning a 1.3/4 in the 18-49 rating demographics on the Nielson ratings scale, ranking second on its timeslot and fourth for the night in the 18-49 demographics, behind Dateline NBC, Barbara Walters: Her Story, and Shark Tank. This was an 11% increase in viewership from the previous episode, which was watched by 4.78 million viewers with a 1.3/4 and it's also a 7% increase in viewership from the previous season finale, which was watched by 4.99 million viewers with a 1.7/5. This means that 1.3 percent of all households with televisions watched the episode, while 4 percent of all households watching television at that time watched it.

With DVR factoring in, the episode was watched by 7.97 million viewers with a 2.4 ratings share in the 18-49 demographics. Overall, the third season of Grimm averaged 7.97 million viewers, a 14% increase from the second season, which averaged 6.95 million viewers.

=== Critical reviews ===
"Blond Ambition" received positive reviews. The A.V. Club's Kevin McFarland gave the episode a "B" grade and wrote, "This season of Grimm began by uniting the rest of the team behind Nick Burkhardt in a way they'd never banded together before — with him kidnapped and under some kind of voodoo spell — and then returned a supercharged Nick as an inexplicably empowered leader. (Seriously, the show never bothered to explain anything related to what happened.) That unification grew stronger over the course of the season, with Renard leading Nick and Hank on the police side, while Nick oversaw and increasingly complementary team whenever he had to take matters into his own hands."

Nick McHatton from TV Fanatic, gave a 4.5 star rating out of 5, stating: "The finale is a game-changer for Nick now that he's lost his power. He mentions that being a Grimm has caused extra drama in his life, but Nick really does not know how to live his life without being a Grimm anymore."

MaryAnn Sleasman from TV.com, wrote, "Change isn't easy, and Nick's recent mistakes will make that change even harder still. Without his powers, without Renard — the only other party here who really knows what's going on — and potentially without the allies he's counted on time and time and time again over the last few years, the Grimm that returns in the fall could be a much more spartan version of the collaborative effort we've grown accustomed to."
