= Alexis Denisof =

American actor (born 1966)

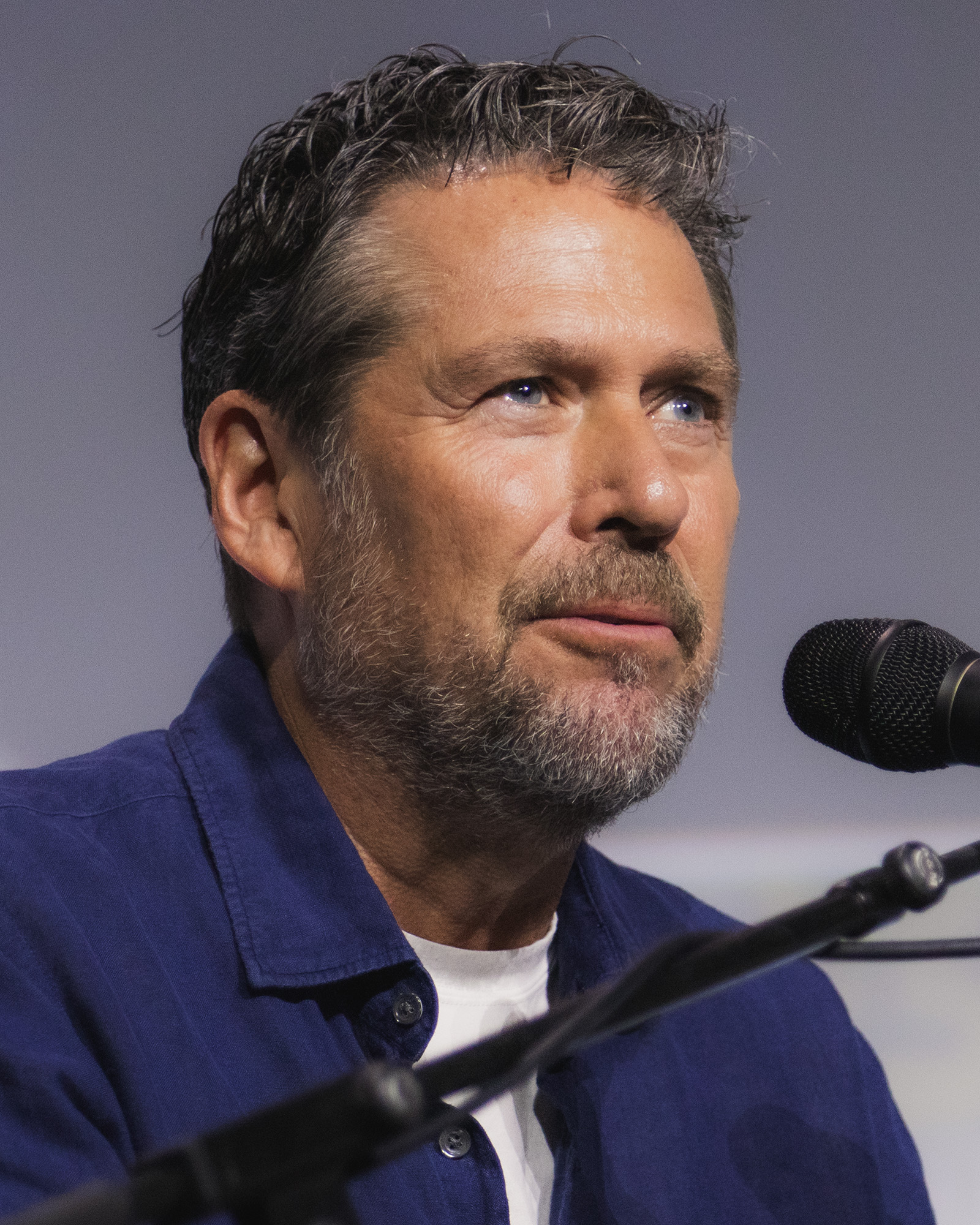
- Denisof in 2026
- Born: February 25, 1966 (age 60); Salisbury, Maryland, U.S.
- Education: London Academy of Music and Dramatic Art
- Occupation: Actor
- Years active: 1986–present
- Spouse: Alyson Hannigan (m. 2003)
- Children: 2

Alexis Denisof (born February 25, 1966) is an American actor, primarily known for playing Wesley Wyndam-Pryce in the television series Buffy the Vampire Slayer and its spin-off Angel. He also had a recurring role on How I Met Your Mother. His wife, Alyson Hannigan, starred in both Buffy the Vampire Slayer and How I Met Your Mother.

== Early life ==
Denisof was born in Salisbury, Maryland, the son of Christiana Taylor and Gerald Denisof. He moved to Seattle, Washington, when he was three years old. He attended Highline College, where his mother was head of the drama department. After graduating from St Paul's School in Concord, New Hampshire, at the age of 17, he moved to London, England, where he lived and worked for several years. Denisof is listed as an Alumnus of the London Academy of Music and Dramatic Art in 2017–18 'LAMDA Review of the Year'.

== Career ==
Beginning his career in the film industry, Denisof was the fight director for a stage production of Hamlet, and in 1991 was the fight director for the BBC's The Other Side, Romeo and Juliet, and The Soul's Dark Night. His first lead role was alongside Sir Christopher Lee in the feature film Murder Story (1989) where he played an investigative reporter. One of his first known works in television was on the arcade version of the video for "Got My Mind Set On You" by George Harrison. In 1995, he landed a small part in the 1995 film First Knight, appearing as one of Arthur's round table knights in multiple scenes with Sean Connery and Richard Gere.

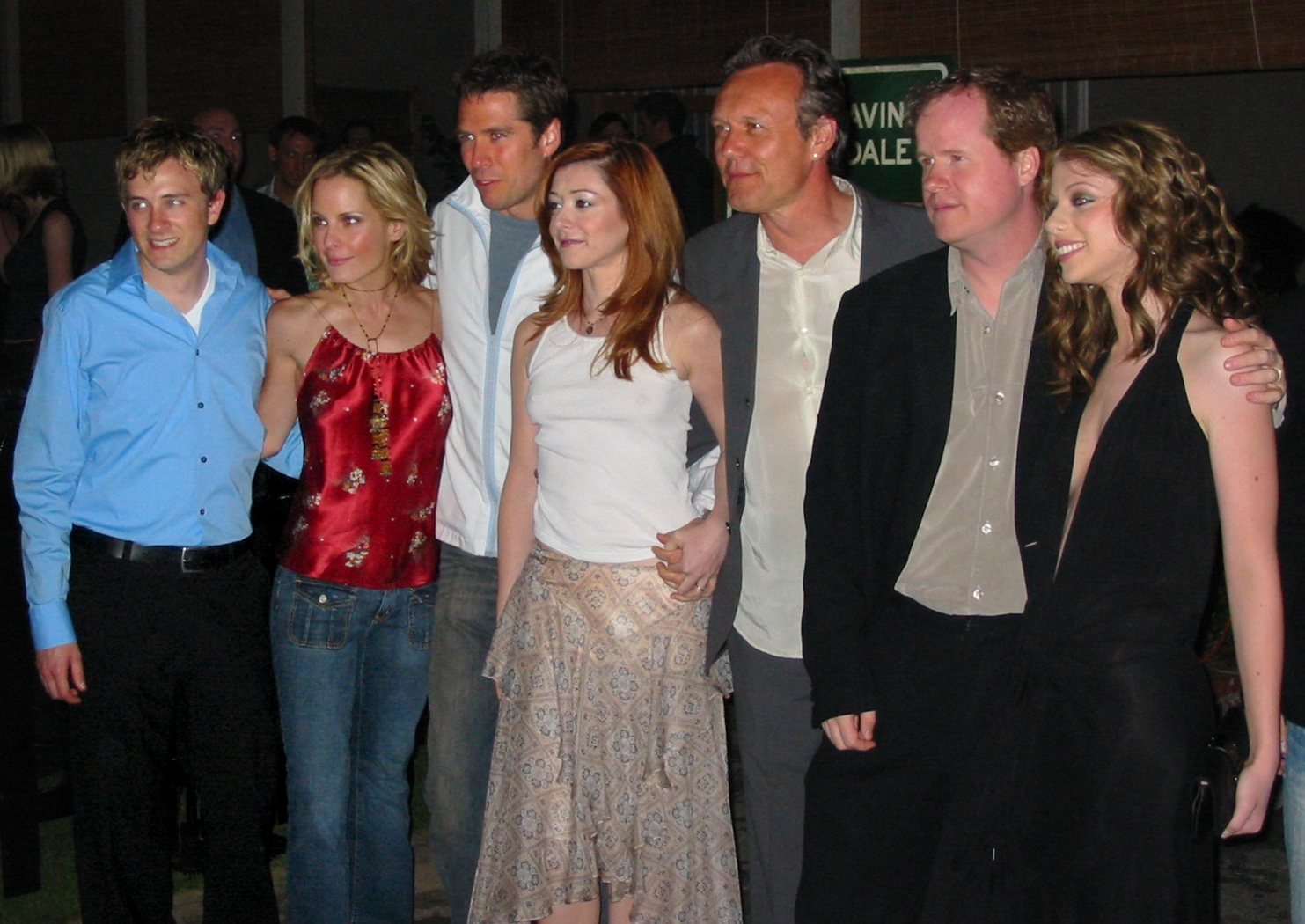
(From left to right) Tom Lenk, Emma Caulfield, Denisof, Alyson Hannigan, Anthony Stewart Head, Joss Whedon, Michelle Trachtenberg at the Buffy cast party, April 18, 2003

His best-known character, Wesley Wyndam-Pryce, was introduced in 1999 in the third season of Buffy the Vampire Slayer as Buffy's replacement Watcher. Originally, Wyndam-Pryce was supposed to be killed off in the season 3 finale but, due to Whedon's surprise at how well he fit into the series, Denisof was given the choice about his character's fate and chose for him to live. As a result, Wyndam-Pryce later arrived as a motorcycle-riding rogue demon-hunter in season one, episode 10 of Angel, and was an official main cast member from episode 11 on, effectively replacing the character Doyle. Wyndam-Pryce appeared in 100 out of the 110 episodes of the series.

The end of the series in 2004 saw a lag in Denisof's career. Save for appearing in three episodes of the hit series How I Met Your Mother, as the goofy philandering Sandy Rivers, Denisof would not work as much as he used to for the next several years. During this time he appeared in several stage productions, including Rope at Chichester Festival Theatre's Minerva Theatre with Anthony Head, who played Wesley's predecessor Rupert Giles on Buffy. Denisof was among 200 actors considered for the role of James Bond in Casino Royale, but lost out to Daniel Craig. Later, in 2008, he appeared in season 2 of Private Practice as a man named Daniel, a bigamist who has two pregnant wives who don't know about each other. In 2009, he appeared in four episodes of Joss Whedon's Dollhouse as Senator Daniel Perrin.

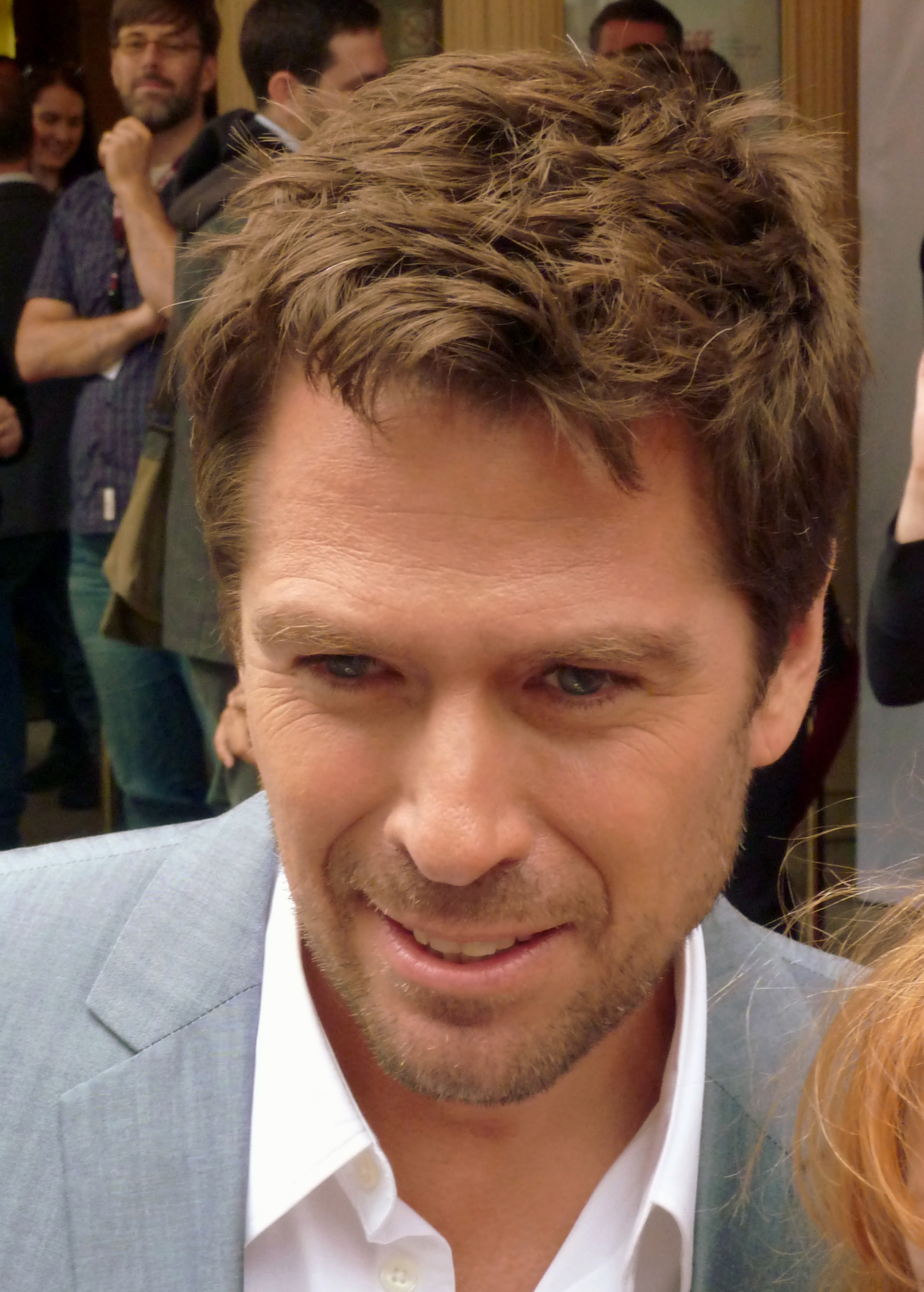
Denisof at the 2012 Toronto Film Festival

In 2011, Denisof reprised his recurring role as Sandy Rivers in How I Met Your Mother; he ultimately appeared in 10 episodes in total, and his last appearance was in the episode "Gary Blauman". In a season 1 commentary, creators Craig Thomas and Carter Bays speculated that Denisof was initially reluctant to take the role back in 2006 because he feared it was just charity work on account of his wife, Hannigan, playing a main character on the show. They went on to state that he was not aware, until they actually told him, that they were huge fans of his work dating back to his time on Angel.

Since 2011, Denisof has been relatively active. He played a voice role in the animated DC film Justice League: Doom. He was featured in the majority of episodes in the AOL webseries Little Women, Big Cars. He was then cast as a lead in Bryan Singer's new webseries H+: The Digital Series. He then reunited with Joss Whedon for two different film projects. The first was a minor role in the summer blockbuster The Avengers, as The Other, a servant of the character Thanos, and a cohort of Loki. The second was the lead male role in a modern version of Shakespeare's Much Ado About Nothing, which premiered at the Toronto Film Festival, to positive reviews from critics. The film was released worldwide in June 2013.

In August 2013, he was cast in the third season of NBC's Grimm as a recurring character named Viktor Chlodwig zu Schellendorf von Konigsburg. In 2014, Denisof reprised his role as The Other in Guardians of the Galaxy. In the same year he began starring in the MTV television series Finding Carter as David Wilson. As of 2018, Denisof starred in the web series I Love Bekka & Lucy as Glenn, and was nominated for a Primetime Emmy Award for Outstanding Actor in a Short Form Comedy or Drama Series, his first such nomination.

On November 28, 2018, Deadline Hollywood reported that Denisof would play the recurring role of Adam Masters in the second season of Netflix's Chilling Adventures of Sabrina. In 2019 he began playing the recurring role of Professor Vardemus in the supernatural television show Legacies.

== Personal life ==
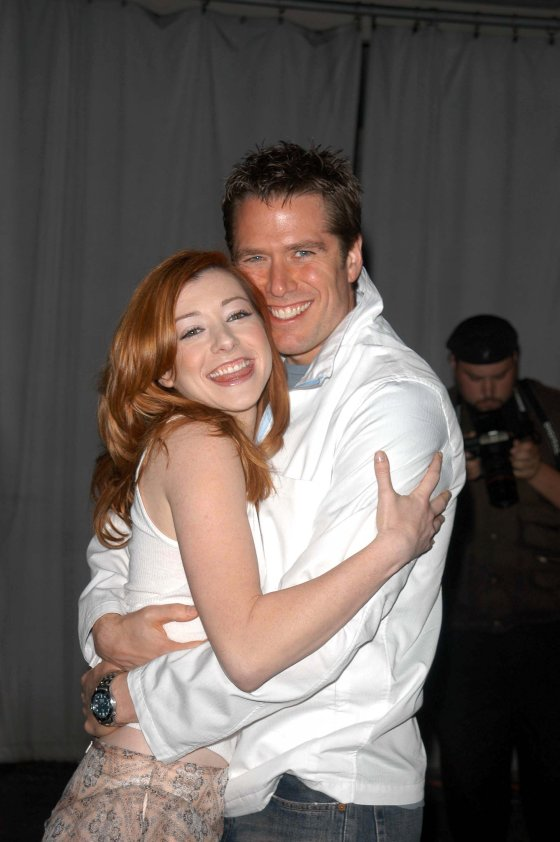
Denisof with Alyson Hannigan, April 18, 2003

According to the DVD release of Angel's season five, three weeks before the filming of the season premiere, Denisof was stricken with Bell's palsy, from which he later recovered. Due to the paralysis of the left side of his face, scenes were structured to not show its effects.

Denisof married past co-star Alyson Hannigan, who played Willow Rosenberg in Buffy the Vampire Slayer, on October 11, 2003. The couple live in Encino, Los Angeles. They have two daughters.

== Filmography ==
=== Film ===
Year	Title	Role	Note
1989	Murder Story	Tony Zonis	
1991	Dakota Road	Jacob	
1991	Snow and Fire	David	
1995	Innocent Lies	Christopher Wood	
1995	First Knight	Sir Gaheris	
1996	True Blue	Ed Fox	
1998	The Misadventures of Margaret	George	
1999	Rogue Trader	Fernando Gueller	
2001	Beyond the City Limits	Yuri	
2002	Tarzan & Jane	Nigel Taylor	Voice
2011	Love, Wedding, Marriage	Lloyd	
2011	All-Star Superman	Leo Quintum	Voice
2012	Justice League: Doom	Mirror Master	Voice
2012	The Avengers	The Other	
2012	Little Women, Big Cars	Woody	
2012	Much Ado About Nothing	Benedick	
2014	Guardians of the Galaxy	The Other	
2020	Under My Skin	Mike	

=== Television ===
Year	Title	Role	Notes
1994	Romeo and Juliet	Tybalt	Television film
1994	Faith	Joel	Television film
1994	Soldier Soldier	Bob Steadman	Episode: "Proud Man"
1997	Crime Traveller		Episode "Fashion Shoot"
1997	Sharpe's Revenge	John Rossendale	Television film
1997	Sharpe's Justice	John Rossendale	Television film
1997	Sharpe's Waterloo	John Rossendale	Television film
1997	Hostile Waters	John Baker	Television film
1997	Highlander: The Series	Steve Banner	Episode: "Diplomatic Immunity"
1998	Ghost Cop	Jonah Blade	TV pilot
1998	The Orchard Walls	Dennis	Television film
1999	Noah's Ark	Ham	Television film
1999	Buffy the Vampire Slayer	Wesley Wyndam-Pryce	Recurring role (season 3)
1999–2004	Angel	Wesley Wyndam-Pryce	Main role
2000	Randall & Hopkirk (Deceased)	Richard Shelley	Episode: "Paranoia"
2001	Batman Beyond	Zander	Voice, episode: "Curse of the Kobra"
2001	The Legend of Tarzan	Nigel Taylor, Henry	Voice, episodes: "The Flying Ace" and "The New Wave"
2006	Justice League Unlimited	Mirror Master	Voice, episode: "Flash and Substance"
2006–2014	How I Met Your Mother	Sandy Rivers	Recurring role
2008	Private Practice	Daniel Larson	Episode: "Serving Two Masters"
2009	Dollhouse	Senator Daniel Perrin	4 episodes
2012–2013	H+: The Digital Series	Conall Sheehan	Web series
2013	Perception	Dr. Randall Vetter	Episode: "Defective"
2013–2015	Grimm	Viktor Chlodwig zu Schellendorf von Konigsburg	Recurring role (seasons 3–4)
2014–2015	Finding Carter	David Wilson	Main role
2015	Robot Chicken	Mr. Peanut, Michael Knight, Knife Shark Narrator	Voice, episode: "Cheese Puff Mountain"
2017	I Love Bekka & Lucy	Glenn	Main role
2019–2020	Chilling Adventures of Sabrina	Adam Masters	4 episodes
2019–2022	Legacies	Rupert Vardemus	Recurring role
2023	How I Met Your Father	Sandy Rivers	Episodes: "Ride or Die" and "Shady Parker"
