= Cry Havoc (Grimm) =

- Grimm episode
- Episode no.: Season 4 Episode 22
- Directed by: Norberto Barba
- Written by: Thomas Ian Griffith
- Cinematography by: Eliot Rockett
- Editing by: Chris B. Willingham
- Production code: 422
- Original air date: May 15, 2015
- Running time: 42 minutes

Guest appearances
- Nico Evers-Swindell as Kenneth Alun Goderich Bowes-Lyon; Jacqueline Toboni as Theresa "Trubel" Rubel; Elizabeth Rodriguez as Katrina Chavez; Philip Anthony-Rodriguez as Marcus Rispoli; Damien Puckler as Martin Meisner; Danny Bruno as Bud Wurstner

Episode chronology
← Previous "Headache"	Next → "The Grimm Identity"
- Grimm season 4

"Cry Havoc" is the 22nd episode and season finale of season 4 of the supernatural drama television series Grimm and the 88th episode overall, which premiered on May 15, 2015, on NBC. The episode was written by Thomas Ian Griffith and was directed by Norberto Barba.

== Plot ==
Opening quote: "O, from this time forth, my thoughts be bloody or be nothing worth."

Nick (David Giuntoli) is still in shock after discovering his mother's head in a box. Trubel (Jacqueline Toboni) and Hank (Russell Hornsby) realize that there are many Wesen surrounding the house and they escape the house when Kenneth (Nico Evers-Swindell) and Rispoli (Philip Anthony-Rodriguez) send Verrat agents.

Renard (Sasha Roiz) is given a drink by Monroe (Silas Weir Mitchell) and Rosalee (Bree Turner) to heal himself after his possession. Nick, Hank and Trubel arrive at Bud's (Danny Bruno) house for Adalind (Claire Coffee) to get information about the Royals. They have her act as if she found the head of the Hundjäger Trubel killed earlier in her hotel room, so they can send-out an APB on those names. Using the information, Nick finds that his mother received an e-mail from his computer and Juliette (Bitsie Tulloch) was the only other person to know about it. The police eventually arrest Kenneth for Kelly Burkhardt's murder.

Wu (Reggie Lee) takes Kenneth to an abandoned warehouse and drives away. Kenneth gets up off the floor and looks around into a vast empty space until Nick slowly emerges from the shadows and confronts him. They fight until Kenneth confesses that Juliette is with the Royals and that the King has kidnapped Diana. In the end, Nick kills Kenneth.

Wu manages to find Juliette's secret address and Nick goes after her, telling everyone that in case of finding her, they need to kill her. Nick, Hank, Monroe, Wu and Trubel go to the compound to stop the King and Juliette from leaving Portland with Diana. They kill many Hundjäger guards. Rispoli dies falling from the third floor of the spiral staircase. Nick sees Juliette and the King bolt with Diana toward a waiting helicopter. Later, Meisner (Damien Puckler) is revealed to be the helicopter co-pilot when he throws the King out to his death. Diana remembers Meisner attending her birth and they smile at one another.

Hank and Renard arrive at the warehouse. We see them manipulating the scene at Kenneth's body to make it look like he was Jack the Ripper.

Nick arrives home to find Juliette. Enraged and wounded by the role she played in his mother's murder, he chokes her as she demands: "do it, kill me" but he relents. They then fight fiercely, and Juliette badly beats up Nick, and he ends up lying near her boots. Finally Nick is defeated by the supervillain Juliette, who is ready to kill him. An instant before she does, however, Trubel bursts in and shoots the evil Juliette with a crossbow, piercing her heart and killing her. Nick weeps, holding Juliette in his arms.

Meanwhile, outside the house, cars begin to appear and agents begin to surround the house. Chavez (Elizabeth Rodriguez) is revealed to be the leader of the group, telling them to "Get her."

== Reception ==
=== Viewers ===
The episode was viewed by 4.74 million people, earning a 1.1/4 in the 18-49 rating demographics on the Nielson ratings scale, ranking third on its timeslot and fifth for the night in the 18-49 demographics, behind 20/20, The Amazing Race, Beyond the Tank, and Shark Tank. This was a 12% increase in viewership from the previous episode, which was watched by 4.21 million viewers with a 1.0/4. This means that 1.1 percent of all households with televisions watched the episode, while 4 percent of all households watching television at that time watched it.

Overall, the fourth season of Grimm averaged 6.98 million viewers, which is a 13% decrease from last season, which averaged 7.97 million viewers.

=== Critical reviews ===
"Cry Havoc" received mostly positive reviews. Les Chappell from The A.V. Club gave the episode an "A−" rating and wrote, "'Cry Havoc' benefits from this late season narrative inertia, as it's an episode that's constantly in motion. Picking up immediately from the 'Headache' cliffhanger of finding Kelly's head in the box, Nick and the rest of Team Grimm are on the warpath immediately. You can always tell on Grimm how bad things have gotten by the degree to which these officers of the law disregard the law part of the equation, and it's jettisoned right away as the Trubel-severed Verrat head winds up in Wu's car trunk. Here though, it's a mix of enforcing the law and subverting it, as they use the head and Adalind's cooperation to set Kenneth (or rather Kenneth Alun Goderich Bowes-Lyon, according to his passport) up as a creepy head-taking killer. It's interesting to see the case-of-the-week beats playing out in a different framework, even as you wonder why no officers are able to connect Adalind to the dozen or so crimes she's been connected to since the start of the series."

Kathleen Wiedel from TV Fanatic, gave a 4.8 star rating out of 5, stating: "'Cry Havoc' followed a really simple, straightforward plot. There was no case of the week this time, and almost everything that happened fed into the A-plot (otherwise known as the Save Diana plot). The only B-plot was really Renard dealing with the aftermath of Jack. The lack of distractions really worked in this episode's favor. The story was fast-paced and adrenaline-fueled... and surprisingly took place entirely in one night! As Bud put it."

MaryAnn Sleasman from TV.com, wrote, "Like the best kind of season finale, however, 'Cry Havoc' left me wanting more and eager to see what kind of world Nick and his allies exist in without Juliette, his mother, and his vast library. Three of the biggest support systems that held Nick up were decimated and the effect on Nick was apparent immediately. The freshness of his wounds made Nick's thirst for revenge much more ruthless and with time that razor-sharp brutality should dull. But Nick's losses here were so great and so sudden that this was the sort of situation where he needed his foundation the most. What kind of Grimm is he going to be next season? And, more importantly, what kind of human being?"

Christine Horton of Den of Geek wrote, "This was a satisfying end to a series that perhaps dragged out one or two story arcs longer than it should, and maintained its 'Wesen of the Week' sub-plots when we really wanted more focus on the developing storylines among the main characters. (However kudos to the writers for the Wesenrein story arc, which delivered well above any other Wesen-based tangents this season.) Grimm picked up the pace over the last few episodes, neatly tying up some loose ends. If anything season five should pick up where this episode left off, and let the show continue to explore its darker side."
