= Grimm season 4 =

Grimm
- Season 4
- Region 1 DVD cover art
- No. of episodes: 22

Release
- Original network: NBC
- Original release: October 24, 2014 – May 15, 2015

Season chronology
- ← Previous; Season 3 Next → Season 5

The fourth season of the NBC American supernatural drama series Grimm was announced on March 19, 2014. It consisted of 22 episodes. The series, created by David Greenwalt, Jim Kouf and Stephen Carpenter, follows a descendant of the Grimm line, Nick Burkhardt, as he deals with being a cop, and trying not to expose his secret as a Grimm.

== Cast ==
=== Main cast ===
- David Giuntoli as Nick Burkhardt
- Russell Hornsby as Hank Griffin
- Bitsie Tulloch as Juliette Silverton
- Silas Weir Mitchell as Monroe
- Reggie Lee as Sergeant Drew Wu
- Sasha Roiz as Captain Sean Renard
- Bree Turner as Rosalee Calvert
- Claire Coffee as Adalind Schade

=== Recurring cast ===
- Alexis Denisof as Viktor Chlodwig zu Schellendorf von Konigsburg
- Philip Anthony-Rodriguez as Marcus Rispoli
- Jacqueline Toboni as Theresa "Trubel" Rubel
- Danny Bruno as Rupert "Bud" Ferdinand Wurstner
- Louise Lombard as Elizabeth Lascelles
- Nico Evers-Swindell as Prince Kenneth Alun Goderich Bowes-Lyon
- Garcelle Beauvais as Henrietta
- David Ury as Hofmann
- Elizabeth Rodriguez as Special Agent Chavez
- Will Rothhaar as Officer Jesse Acker
- Lucas Near-Verbrugghe as Josh Porter

=== Guest stars ===
- Toni Trucks as Deputy Janelle Farris
- Arnold Vosloo as Jonathon Wilde (Wesen Bounty Hunter)
- Daniel Roebuck as Lieutenant Peter Orson
- Hank Harris as Andrew "Andy" Harrison
- Gideon Emery as Damien Barso
- Brigid Brannagh as Sara Fisher
- Erick Avari as J.P. Turner
- Rebecca Wisocky as Lily Hinkley
- Richard Brake as Nigel Edmund
- Mark Famiglietti as Linus Balouzian
- Jeff Fahey as Albert Bowden
- Eric Lee Huffman as Max McClay
- Matt Kesslar as Sven Gunderson
- Hillary Tuck as Margaret "Maggie" Bowden
- Ricki Bhullar as Dix Turner
- Khushi Dayao as Suleka Turner
- Amitesh Prasad as Sharat
- Tarun Shetty as Adesh
- Daniel Brockley as Mann
- Joseph Gibson as Man #1
- John Srednicki as Paramedic
- Tyler Irwin as Unruly Suspect

== Production ==
NBC CEO Robert Greenblatt confirmed in early 2014 that the chances of renewing the series for a fourth season were very high thanks to the success programming show on Friday nights in the United States: "I think that the genre audience proves to be a very loyal one. We like what we're building on Friday night with 'Grimm'."

On March 19, 2014, NBC announced that the series had been renewed for a fourth season with a 22-episode order. In mid May, NBC announced its official TV show's premiered dates, among which is included the fourth season of Grimm that will air on October 24, 2014.

=== Casting ===
Jacqueline Toboni continues her recurring role as Theresa "Trubel" Rubel, for season four. In mid-July Elizabeth Rodriguez was cast as Special Agent Chavez, a Steinadler and one of four FBI agents assigned to investigate the recent homicide of Weston Steward. Will Rothhaar appeared as Officer Acker, a cop with a dark side, in 3 episodes beginning with episode 8. Toni Trucks will appear as Deputy Janelle Farris in "Highway of Tears"; a sheriff who will help Nick & Hank with an investigation.

=== Filming ===
Like the previous three seasons, the majority of filming takes place in the Portland, Oregon area. Filming for the season began on July 16, 2014.

== Broadcast ==
The season aired simultaneously on CTV in Canada. It is currently airing on Universal Channel in Southeast Asia. In Australia, it began airing on Fox8 on January 7, 2015. It premiered on Watch in the United Kingdom and Ireland on January 28, 2015.

== Episodes ==
No. overall	No. in season	Title	Directed by	Written by	Original release date	Prod. code	US viewers (millions)
67	1	"Thanks for the Memories"	Norberto Barba	David Greenwalt & Jim Kouf	October 24, 2014	401	5.28
Nick and Juliette struggle with the loss of his powers, while Monroe and Rosalee postpone their honeymoon to help out. Nick, Hank, and Trubel investigate a Gedächtnis-Esser (octopus-like wesen), as Capt. Renard lies in critical condition. Meanwhile, the Grimm Diaries that Trubel owns in the guest room of Nick's house attract unwanted attention from Wu and Special Agent Chavez. Opening quote: "Knowledge is power."
68	2	"Octopus Head"	Terrence O'Hara	David Greenwalt & Jim Kouf	October 31, 2014	402	4.54
Capt. Renard dies while in the hospital, but only for a moment as his mother, Elizabeth, revives him with her powers and abilities. Meanwhile in Austria, Viktor locks Adalind in a Hexenbiest-proof dungeon. Nick and Hank send Trubel by herself to keep an eye on the Gedächtnis Esser. Opening quote: "A man's real possession is his memory. In nothing else is he rich, In nothing else he is poor."
69	3	"The Last Fight"	Paul Kaufman	Thomas Ian Griffith	November 7, 2014	403	4.93
Nick and Hank investigate a Wesen boxing gym while Elizabeth helps Monroe and Rosalee search for a way to restore Nick's powers. Trubel keeps her eyes on a young wesen boxer in his teens named Clay who is a Heftigauroch (bull-like wesen), and his wesen boxing trainer named Stan who is a Schinderdiv (warthog-like wesen). Opening quote: "Stars, hide your fires; let not light see my black and deep desires."
70	4	"Dyin' on a Prayer"	Tawnia McKiernan	Sean Calder	November 14, 2014	404	5.01
Nick and Hank investigate a possible homicide where the victim was Keith Harrow, Sara Fisher's abusive ex-husband & a wesen called siegbarste (ogre-like wesen). It appears that he has died from asphyxiation by clay. It turns out he was killed by a Golem who was called upon by the Rabbi brother of the victim's ex-wife, Ben Fisher. Trubel's presence still doesn't sit well with Wu. Elizabeth finds a way to restore Nick's Grimm powers, but requires a special something to make it happen. Opening quote: "Oh, remember that you fashioned me out of clay! Will you then bring me down to dust?"
71	5	"Cry Luison"	Eric Laneuville	Michael Golamco	November 21, 2014	405	5.43
Nick and Hank investigate a vehicular manslaughter case where the driver turns out to be a rich heir being driven to madness by her Luison (Wolf-like wesen) quadruplet husband named Gabriel and his three brothers. Bud enlists Trubel to deal with a possible threat to Nick's life. Nick and Juliette deeply consider whether or not to regain his Grimm abilities, since the process comes with a significant catch. When Monroe and Rosalee are threatened by the Wolfsangel, Juliette tells Nick that he must become a Grimm again. Opening quote: "A liar will not be believed, even when he speaks the truth."
72	6	"Highway of Tears"	John Behring	Alan DiFiore	November 28, 2014	406	5.17
Juliette tells Nick that he needs to be a Grimm again after the most recent attack on Monroe and Rosalee regarding their marriage. Later, Nick and Hank investigate a weird and unusual sacrificing wesen ritual by a Phansigar (Komodo dragon-like wesen). Nick finally gets his Grimm power abilities back. Trubel deals with being watched by another agent who works for Chavez, as well as Josh Porter arriving on the scene. Opening quote: "There is no mercy in you. You cut off the heads of men and women and these you wear as a garland around your neck."
73	7	"The Grimm Who Stole Christmas"	John Gray	Dan E. Fesman	December 5, 2014	407	4.96
Monroe has a unique Christmas surprise for Rosalee. Trubel and Josh work together to track down the Wesenrein with gleichheit (equality) masks who keep threatening against Monroe and Rosalee's mischehen (mixed marriage). Meanwhile, Nick and Hank investigate a series of strange home invasions and uncover a bizarre Wesen phenomenon called kallikantzaroi (malevolent goblins-like wesen), with a rare genetic disease disorder during adolescence that wreaks havoc on Christmas unless they eat fruitcake until sunrise. Then the children of Indole Gentile (deer-like wesen) are back to normal. Opening quote: "I have but to swallow this, and be for the rest of my days persecuted by a legion of goblins, all of my own creation. Humbug, I'll tell you; humbug!"
74	8	"Chupacabra"	Aaron Lipstadt	Brenna Kouf	December 12, 2014	408	5.07
An unsuspecting traveler brings a blood-sucking cryptid – the legendary "El Chupacabra" – to Portland, and Nick and Hank investigate. Wu confronts Nick about what he has seen about the Grimm Books and Nick's odd behavior. Monroe and Rosalee prepare to embark on their honeymoon, but are threatened once again by the Wesenrein. Opening quote: "Cuide su rebaño, nunca deje su lado. Cuide su sangre, el Chupacabra tiene hambre." ("Take care of your flock, never leave their side. Watch your blood, for the chupacabra is hungry.")
75	9	"Wesenrein"	Hanelle Culpepper	Thomas Ian Griffith	January 16, 2015	409	4.62
Nick and Hank recruit Wu to help after revealing him to the world of Wesen. After Monroe gets kidnapped by the Wesenrein, the team must find out where he is before he is sacrificed and killed. Juliette's attempt to cope with transforming into a Hexenbiest is put on hold while she tries to tend to an anxious Rosalee. Opening quote: "He had them brought before the court, and a judgment was handed down."
76	10	"Tribunal"	Peter Werner	David Greenwalt & Jim Kouf	January 23, 2015	410	5.02
Monroe is on trial by the Wesenrein for a ritual that is performed called the "Tribunal". Nick and Hank train Wu to deal with woged wesen, which allows him to confront Officer Jesse Acker, who is secretly a part of the Wesenrein, but without leverage, he cannot force him to turn on the group. Juliette and Rosalee scour the wedding guest list, provided by Trubel, with help from Bud, to find anyone who would have exposed them to the Wesenrein. Opening quote: "May the God of Vengeance now yield me His place to punish the wicked."
77	11	"Death Do Us Part"	Constantine Makris	Jeff Miller	January 30, 2015	411	4.85
Monroe and Rosalee finally leave Portland to head and embark on their honeymoon, but this doesn't mean trouble somewhat isn't stirring in Portland. Nick, Hank, and Wu investigate a shocking homicide of a ghost hunter at a supposedly abandoned residence. Portland residents think it is haunted by a ghost; but Nick, Hank and Wu discover that an electric eel-like wesen called a Matanca Zumbido is responsible. Juliette's startling revelation to Captain Renard leads her to a longtime family friend from his past, a mystical woman named Henrietta (Garcelle Beauvais). Opening quote: "He felt now that he was not simply close to her, but that he did not know where he ended and she began."
78	12	"Maréchaussée"	Eric Laneuville	David Greenwalt & Jim Kouf	February 6, 2015	412	4.67
Nick and Hank investigate the murders of Wesen Fortune Tellers who have been using their woge in a scam to get money, which involves the Wesen Council and a manticore bounty hunter of theirs. Juliette meets up with Henrietta (Garcelle Beauvais) and is given bad news. Viktor and Adalind head back to Portland from Austria to find baby Diana's whereabouts. Opening quote: "Everyone sees what you appear to be, few experience what you really are."
79	13	"Trial by Fire"	Norberto Barba	Sean Calder	February 13, 2015	413	4.86
During an investigation of an arson case that involves an Excandesco (phoenix-like wesen), Nick is forced to turn to a Bauerschwein arson investigator Lt. Peter Orson (Daniel Roebuck) whom he had put behind bars. Viktor teaches Adalind about well-played diplomacy and she attacks Juliette. Nick learns Juliette is a hexenbiest. Opening quote: "And glory like the phoenix midst her fires, Exhales her odours, blazes, and expires."
80	14	"Bad Luck"	Terrence O'Hara	Thomas Ian Griffith	March 20, 2015	414	4.78
After Nick finds out Juliette has become a Hexenbiest he visits Henrietta, who says there is no cure and Nick must kill Juliette or accept her new status. He cannot cope with the change though, leading Juliette to leave. Meanwhile, Nick, Hank, and Wu investigate the murder of a teenager whose foot was cut off. They discover the victim was a Willahara (rabbit like wesen), whose foot was cut off so a couple could improve their fertility. Monroe and Rosalee go undercover to a Wesen fertility clinic to find the killer. Adalind meets Renard, who says he knew of Juliette's change and sent her to Henrietta to learn more. Adalind pays Henrietta a visit to understand the extent of Juliette's powers but instead learns she is pregnant with Nick's child. Opening quote: "No one is so thoroughly superstitious as the godless man."
81	15	"Double Date"	Karen Gaviola	Brenna Kouf	March 27, 2015	415	4.93
Nick and Hank investigate a crime scene in the middle of a bizarre love triangle involved a flatworm like wesen called huntha lami muuaji. Captain Renard seeks Monroe and Rosalee's help to stop phantom bleeding when he was shot by Weston Steward. Adalind asks for a favor that could change the course of Juliette's relationship with Nick. Juliette faces a tough decision about her future with Nick. Opening quote: "One could have called that shape a woman or a boy: for it seemed neither and seemed both."
82	16	"Heartbreaker"	Rob Bailey	Dan E. Fesman	April 3, 2015	416	4.51
Nick and Hank investigate the homicide of a cyclist named Zack and they meet a foterseele (golden/poison dart frog like wesen) named Bella Turner with a tragic poisonous touch of The Tale of the Frog Prince. When the King from the Royal family shows up in Portland, Captain Renard and Adalind realize the Royal family have stepped up their efforts to find Diana. Juliette ponders whether to embrace her new self or get rid of it. Opening quote: "How the silly frog does talk! He...can be no companion to any human being!"
83	17	"Hibernaculum"	John Behring	Michael Golamco	April 10, 2015	417	4.76
Nick, Hank, and Wu are called to investigate a rare Wesen that leaves its victims frozen solid, a hibernacula called Varme Tyv. Meanwhile, Juliette starts to feel she is losing her humanity as she seeks to get revenge against Adalind. Elsewhere, Captain Renard continues to suffer from mysterious bleeding and visions, while Monroe works toward coming to grips with the Wesenrein incident. Opening quote: "Ah! It was colder than ice; it penetrated to his very heart."
84	18	"Mishipeshu"	Omar Madha	Alan DiFiore	April 17, 2015	418	4.54
Nick and Hank newest investigation is on a homicide in the dark and mysterious path of a local Native American "vision quest" involved mishipeshu (underwater Panther). Juliette's errant behavior lands her in trouble with the wrong side of the law. Monroe and Rosalee are on mission with Captain Renard's assistance. Hank falls prey to a Native American's spirit with yellow eyes. Opening quote: "The Spirit you seek in the water is only a reflection of yourself."
85	19	"Iron Hans"	Sebastián Silva	David Greenwalt & Jim Kouf	April 24, 2015	419	4.66
Nick and Hank investigate a homicide and they learn it's connected to an age-old rite of passage for Wesen boys. Meanwhile, Juliette meets a surprising ally. Captain Sean Renard battles the darkness within and Nick finds hope for Juliette in the last person he expected: Adalind. Juliette makes a last visit to Aunt Marie's trailer. Opening quote: "He had killed man, the noblest game of all, and he had killed in the face of the law of club and fang."
86	20	"You Don't Know Jack"	Terrence O'Hara	Sean Calder & Michael Golamco	May 1, 2015	420	4.22
A string of homicides have the press asking Captain Renard if a Jack the Ripper copycat has arrived in Portland. During the investigation, Nick, Hank, Monroe and Wu deal with a situation they never expected. Meanwhile, Adalind and Rosalee must work together on a last ditch attempt to fix Juliette's condition. Elsewhere, Juliette decides to help her new ally even if it means hurting those around her. Opening quote: "Catch me when you can..."
87	21	"Headache"	Jim Kouf	David Greenwalt & Jim Kouf	May 8, 2015	421	4.21
Nick and Hank investigate a grisly murder get closer to uncover the identity of the vicious serial killer while Wu's life is in grave danger. Monroe & Rosalee try to help Captain Renard to heal him from his visions and bleeding. Juliette solidifies a new alliance as she works to get revenge which gets Nick's mother killed. Elsewhere, Trubel is back in Portland from Philadelphia to surprise them. Opening quote: "Stronger than lover's love is lover's hate. Incurable, in each the wounds they make."
88	22	"Cry Havoc"	Noberto Barba	Thomas Ian Griffith	May 15, 2015	422	4.74
After the shocking discovery of his mother's death, Nick is determined to get revenge and take the fight to the royals with Trubel's help. Meanwhile, Juliette's alliance continues to lead her down the dark path. Opening quote: "O, from this time forth, my thoughts be bloody or be nothing worth."

== Ratings ==
No. in series	No. in episode	Title	Air Date	Timeslot (ET)	Rating/Share 18-49	Viewers (million)	DVR 18-49	DVR Viewers (millions)	Total 18-49	Total Viewers (millions)
67	1	Thanks for the Memories	October 24, 2014	Friday; 9:00 P.M.	1.4/5	5.28	1.0	2.78	2.4	8.06
68	2	Octopus Head	October 31, 2014	Friday; 9:00 P.M.	1.1/4	4.54	1.0	2.67	2.1	7.21
69	3	The Last Fight	November 7, 2014	Friday; 9:00 P.M.	1.3/4	4.93	1.1	2.72	2.4	7.65
70	4	Dyin' on a Prayer	November 14, 2014	Friday; 9:00 P.M.	1.2/4	5.01	0.9	—N/a	2.1	—N/a
71	5	Cry Luison	November 21, 2014	Friday; 9:00 P.M.	1.3/5	5.43	1.1	2.82	2.4	8.25
72	6	Highway of Tears	November 28, 2014	Friday; 9:00 P.M.	1.2/4	5.17	1.2	2.90	2.4	8.07
73	7	The Grimm Who Stole Christmas	December 5, 2014	Friday; 9:00 P.M.	1.2/4	4.96	1.2	2.60	2.2	7.56
74	8	Chupacabra	December 12, 2014	Friday; 9:00 P.M.	1.3/4	5.07	1.0	2.79	2.3	7.86
75	9	Wesenrein	January 16, 2015	Friday; 9:00 P.M.	1.2/4	4.62	1.1	2.85	2.3	7.47
76	10	Tribunal	January 23, 2015	Friday; 9:00 P.M.	1.3/4	5.02	1.0	2.60	2.3	7.62
77	11	Death Do Us Part	January 30, 2015	Friday; 9:00 P.M.	1.3/4	4.85	1.0	2.86	2.3	7.71
78	12	Maréchaussée	February 6, 2015	Friday; 9:00 P.M.	1.2/4	4.67	1.1	3.04	2.3	7.71
79	13	Trial by Fire	February 13, 2015	Friday; 9:00 P.M.	1.1/4	4.86	1.1	2.93	2.2	7.79
80	14	Bad Luck	February 20, 2015	Friday; 8:00 P.M.	1.1/4	4.78	1.0	2.60	2.1	7.38
81	15	Double Date	March 27, 2015	Friday; 8:00 P.M.	1.0/4	4.93	0.9	2.40	1.9	7.33
82	16	Heartbreaker	April 3, 2015	Friday; 8:00 P.M.	1.0/4	4.51	0.9	2.49	1.9	6.99
83	17	Hibernaculum	April 10, 2015	Friday; 8:00 P.M.	1.1/4	4.76	0.7	2.11	1.8	6.87
84	18	Mishipeshu	April 17, 2015	Friday; 8:00 P.M.	1.0/4	4.54	0.8	2.27	1.8	6.81
85	19	Iron Hans	April 24, 2015	Friday; 8:00 P.M.	1.0/4	4.66	0.7	2.15	1.7	6.71
86	20	You Don't Know Jack	May 1, 2015	Friday; 8:00 P.M.	0.9/4	4.22	0.7	—N/a	1.6	—N/a
87	21	Headache	May 8, 2015	Friday; 8:00 P.M.	1.0/4	4.21	0.7	—N/a	1.7	—N/a
88	22	Cry Havoc	May 15, 2015	Friday; 8:00 P.M.	1.1/4	4.74	0.8	—N/a	1.9	—N/a
