= You Don't Know Jack (Grimm) =

- Grimm episode
- Episode no.: Season 4 Episode 20
- Directed by: Terrence O'Hara
- Written by: Sean Calder; Michael Golamco
- Editing by: Scott Boyd
- Production code: 420
- Original air date: May 1, 2015
- Running time: 42 minutes

Guest appearances
- Nico Evers-Swindell as Kenneth Alun Goderich Bowes-Lyon; Garcelle Beauvais as Henrietta; Danny Bruno as Bud Wurstner

Episode chronology
← Previous "Iron Hans"	Next → "Headache"
- Grimm season 4

"You Don't Know Jack" is the 20th episode of season 4 of the supernatural drama television series Grimm and the 86th episode overall, which premiered on May 1, 2015, on the broadcast network NBC. The episode was written by Sean Calder and Michael Golamco and was directed by Terrence O'Hara.

== Plot ==
A string of homicides has the press asking Captain Renard (Sasha Roiz) if a Jack the Ripper copycat has arrived in Portland. Monroe (Silas Weir Mitchell) traces the mode of operation of the homicides to the Luxembourg Peasants' Revolt. While dealing with the investigation, Nick (David Giuntoli), Hank (Russell Hornsby), Monroe and Wu (Reggie Lee) deal with a situation they never expected. Meanwhile, Adalind (Claire Coffee) and Rosalee (Bree Turner) must work together on a last-ditch attempt to fix Juliette's (Bitsie Tulloch) condition. Elsewhere, Juliette decides to help her new ally even if it means hurting those around her.

== Reception ==
=== Viewers ===
The episode was viewed by 4.22 million people, earning a 0.9/4 in the 18-49 rating demographics on the Nielson ratings scale, ranking third on its timeslot and eight for the night in the 18-49 demographics, behind 20/20, Dateline NBC, The Amazing Race, Hawaii Five-0, Blue Bloods, Beyond the Tank, and Shark Tank. This was a 10% decrease in viewership from the previous episode, which was watched by 4.66 million viewers with a 1.0/4. This means that 0.9 percent of all households with televisions watched the episode, while 4 percent of all households watching television at that time watched it.

=== Critical reviews ===
"You Don't Know Jack" received positive reviews. Les Chappell from The A.V. Club gave the episode an "A−" rating and wrote, "The fact that the show has gone the distance it has in reversing the roles of the two women is a large part why Grimm now feels like it's growing in the right directions. After 'Iron Hans' burned down literal and metaphorical links to Grimm's past, 'You Don't Know Jack' doubles down on those moves by further pushing Adalind and Juliette into their opposite camps. And for the second week in a row, those moves feel like the right moves, as it's another exciting and captivating episode that's a cut above most of what's come yet this season."

Kathleen Wiedel from TV Fanatic, gave a 3.8-star rating out of 5, stating: "Prince Kenneth is too smug for his britches, that's for flaming sure. He easily manipulates Juliette into doing exactly what he wants, where he wants. Creep. Every time he opens his smarmy mouth, I imagine the comeuppance that I dearly hope is coming his way. Kenneth's plans play a significant role in Grimm Season 4 Episode 20, but a surprisingly interesting Case of the Week (a misnomer in this instance, since 'Jack' is still out there) and digging up Adalind's mother drew my attention away."

MaryAnn Sleasman from TV.com, wrote, "Can we agree that just handing the Hexen-juice over to Juliette in her current uncooperative incarnation and expecting her to drink it without argument was so utterly naïve on the part of Nick, Monroe, and Rosalee that the only rationale I can come up with for their utter stupidity is that there are still two episodes of Grimm left this season and they need to keep the crazy-Juliette gravy train going just a little bit longer."

Christine Horton of Den of Geek wrote, "The writers have hit the pedal with some force, with 'You Don’t Know Jack' taking a surprisingly sinister turn, as well as delivering some proper shocks. (Despite some macabre moments, Grimm has always offered the audience a sense of coziness, efficiently dispatching any threat to the gang in no more than a couple of episodes. It's as edgy as one of Monroe's woolly cardigans.) However, this episode provided a couple of genuine 'what the hell?' moments that could signal big changes for the course of the show. Conversely, it was also one of the funniest episodes in a while, with Adalind taking the lion's share of pithy one-liners."
