= Hibernaculum (Grimm) =

- Grimm episode
- Episode no.: Season 4 Episode 17
- Directed by: John Behring
- Written by: Michael Golamco
- Cinematography by: Fernando Arguelles
- Editing by: George Pilkinton
- Production code: 417
- Original air date: April 10, 2015
- Running time: 42 minutes

Guest appearances
- Nico Evers-Swindell as Kenneth Alun Goderich Bowes-Lyon; Philip Anthony-Rodriguez as Marcus Rispoli; Matt Keeslar as Sven Gunderson

Episode chronology
← Previous "Heartbreaker"	Next → "Mishipeshu"
- Grimm season 4

"Hibernaculum" is the 17th episode of season 4 of the supernatural drama television series Grimm and the 83rd episode overall, which premiered on April 10, 2015, on NBC. The episode was written by Michael Golamco and was directed by John Behring.

== Plot ==
Elsewhere in Portland, Knute Gunderson's vehicle breaks down. He has a quick look under the hood before he starts walking. He starts to get cold, but he comes across Esther Blake's house as she is talking to her daughter, Jenna on the phone. Knute knocks, but Esther doesn't open the door. Knute tells her his car broke down and he's freezing. Jenna tells her mom not to open the door and to tell him she'll call a tow truck. He goes around the back of the house and kicks in a door. Knute wrestles Esther to the ground. Knute woges into a Varme Tyv, bites Esther's neck, and sucks the body heat out of Esther, killing her and leaving her frozen in place. When Nick and Hank arrive. Wu tells them what Jenna told the police and leads them to Esther's body, Nick tells Wu to check with State Police to see if they've located anymore breakdowns within five miles.

Monroe is working on a clock at home, when his hand starts to shake as he starts thinking about his encounter with the Wesenrein Tribunal. Rosalee then arrives home and Monroe woges, scaring Rosalee. Rosalee asks what's wrong and he apologizes.

Knute drives down a road and comes across the roadblock. He does a U-turn, and the cops quickly get in their cars and go after him. Nick, Hank, Wu, and the state troopers trap him. Knute gets out and runs into the forest. Nick, Hank, and Wu go after him as the troopers stay with the car. As Nick gets close, Knute woges and tries to attack Nick, but he stops when he realizes Nick is a Grimm. Knute tells Hank and Wu, "Don't let him kill me. I'm cold," as he shivers. At the precinct, Nick, Hank, and Wu do a background check on Knute and find that he is from North Dakota and has no criminal record. Wu comes back and tells them something happened to Knute. The trio go to Knute's jail cell, where they find him frozen solid and dead. Nick and Hank arrive to Knute's car and find that there are three of many items including food and bags. They determine that there must be two more Wesen like Knute out there unless he has killed them and dumped the bodies.

Juliette arrives to the spice shop, and is waiting around when Monroe and Rosalee greet her. Monroe asks what's wrong, and she tells them there is a side effect from when she became Adalind and slept with Nick. Juliette tells them, "I'm losing myself. I need help." Nick and Hank come out of the back room and see Juliette. Nick asks if she told them, and she tells him no, but she realizes Nick told Hank. Monroe and Rosalee ask for someone to tell them what's going on, and Nick tells Juliette to tell them or he will. Juliette then woges, completely shocking Monroe and Rosalee. Juliette says she made a mistake in coming there and tells them they all had a hand in this, and then she leaves. After everyone leaves, Rosalee says, "She's a freakin' Hexenbiest?"

Nick, Hank, Wu, and Monroe arrive at the Gunderson residence and notice that there are a lot of cars. Monroe says there could be multiple Varme Tyv in the house if this is the hibernaculum. They go inside the house and notice that in one of the rooms, there is heat coming from the floor, and Nick finds a trapdoor under a rug. All four of them go down, and they soon find the hibernaculum. Nick double checks with Monroe that everyone is in a deep sleep, and they start looking for Sven. Wu spots Sven's tattoos, but they accidentally drop one of the people's hands on someone's face, which causes everyone to wake up. The group quickly gets up and chases Nick, Hank, Wu, and Monroe, who head back upstairs. So they make a break for their cars. The Varme Tyv gain on them fast, so they change course and head for a barn where the taxi Sven stole is located. Hank puts a shovel through the handles as the Varme Tyv bang on the doors. Suddenly Sven and another man break into the barn in the back, so Nick and Hank go to deal with them while Monroe and Wu hold the door. Sven and the other man both woge and start fighting Nick and Hank. Nick and Hank defeat them fairly easily as the rest of the group gets the door open. As soon as they get in, they start falling to the ground, cold. Nick says they need to get them back to the house since they're innocent and they can't just let them die. After putting everyone back in their pile, they head back upstairs, and Monroe asks what happened to Sven. Hank lets him know that Sven froze to death in the barn and asks what they're going to do with him.

== Reception ==
=== Viewers ===
The episode was viewed by 4.76 million people, earning a 1.1/4 in the 18-49 rating demographics on the Nielson ratings scale, ranking third on its timeslot and seventh for the night in the 18-49 demographics, behind The Amazing Race, Hawaii Five-0, Last Man Standing, Blue Bloods, 20/20, and Shark Tank. This was a 5% increase in viewership from the previous episode, which was watched by 4.51 million viewers with a 1.0/4. This means that 1.1 percent of all households with televisions watched the episode, while 4 percent of all households watching television at that time watched it. With DVR factoring in, the episode was watched by 6.87 million viewers and had a 1.8 ratings share in the 18-49 demographics.

=== Critical reviews ===
"Hibernaculum" received mixed-to-positive reviews. Les Chappell from The A.V. Club gave the episode a "C+" rating and wrote, "It's difficult to pin down my feelings on this week's episode of Grimm, because more than any episode in recent memory, this is one where my appreciation of what's going on fluctuates wildly with every scene. The various twists in the case of the week were confounded by the way it stretched credulity, even by this show's standards. (How many corpsicles can you have in a city before reasonable people start asking what's going on?) Interesting parts of the Monroe, Renard, and Juliette stories were introduced and almost immediately pushed aside by the next scene. And for a weekly case that was succeeding on its own merits, it's infuriating to see the show get rid of its complexity in favor of trying to emulate The Walking Dead — the worst season of Walking Dead, no less. (Stupid farm.)"

Kathleen Wiedel from TV Fanatic, gave a 3.8 star rating out of 5, stating: "I have to admit, I got a good amount of guilty pleasure when Adalind realized that Juliette was hunting her. Yeah, not so fun when you're on the receiving end, is it, Adalind?"

MaryAnn Sleasman from TV.com, wrote, "One of the themes that consistently appears in Grimm's Wesen stories is the difficult balancing of existence in both the Wesen world and the human world. It's one of the reasons the show's universe has expanded to become increasingly complex and interesting, complete with monsters who are often more human than the humans themselves. However, it seems that lately, Grimm has focused much more heavily on unusual Wesen and dealt them some pretty terrible outcomes."

Christine Horton of Den of Geek wrote, "On reflection, Hibernaculum could be classed as one of the stranger episodes, even for a show based on fairytales."
