= Cry Luison =

- Grimm episode
- Episode no.: Season 4 Episode 5
- Directed by: Eric Laneuville
- Written by: Michael Golamco
- Cinematography by: Fernando Argüelles
- Editing by: George Pilkinton
- Production code: 405
- Original air date: November 21, 2014
- Running time: 42 minutes

Guest appearances
- Jacqueline Toboni as Theresa "Trubel" Rubel; Alexis Denisof as Prince Viktor Chlodwig zu Schellendorf von Konigsburg; Louise Lombard as Elizabeth Lascelles; Julian Acosta as Gabriel Martel; Jacqueline Obradors as Ava Diaz; Lucas Near-Verbrugghe as Josh Porter; Mark Bloom as the Wolf; Danny Bruno as Bud Wurstner; David Ury as Hofmann

Episode chronology
| ← Previous "Dyin' on a Prayer" | Next → "Highway of Tears" |
- Grimm season 4

"Cry Luison" is the fifth episode of season 4 of the supernatural drama television series Grimm and the 71st episode overall, which premiered on November 21, 2014, on the cable network NBC. The episode was written by Michael Golamco and was directed by Eric Laneuville.

== Plot ==
Opening quote: "A liar will not be believed, even when he speaks the truth."

Elizabeth (Louise Lombard) explains that Juliette (Bitsie Tulloch) has to recreate what Adalind (Claire Coffee) did to Nick (David Giuntoli) in reverse in order to get back his powers: have sex with Nick having drunk a potion that will make her look like Adalind. Nick and Monroe (Silas Weir Mitchell) are opposed to the potion but Juliette replies that this can be the only way to retrieve his powers, and Elizabeth adds that they don't know what else Adalind's spell might do - things could get worse for Nick.

A wife named Ava Diaz (Jacqueline Obradors) leaves her house and finds a wolf-like Wesen, who despite his form, tells her he's her friend and gives her a drink. She shatters the glass, waking her husband Gabriel (Julian Acosta) and flees the house in her car. She gets distracted when the Wesen appears in the car and hits a person, crashing the car into a wall.

The next day, Nick and Trubel (Jacqueline Toboni) are visited by Bud (Danny Bruno), who offers condolences for Nick's powers. When Nick leaves, Bud explains to Trubel that he told someone that Nick lost his powers and now he contacted someone named Shaw, who plans to give Nick a lesson.

Nick and Hank (Russell Hornsby) investigate the crash and Wu (Reggie Lee) continues to ask Nick about the recent events happening to him. They visit Ava but due to the hospital visits, they can only speak with Gabriel, who explains that she thought she saw a wolf and she has a mental illness from six months ago. After he guides them through the house, they deduce that she may have seen a Blutbad. After getting her drawing, they show it to Monroe and Rosalee (Bree Turner), who explain that it is a Luison, a cousin of the Blutbaden. Trubel and Bud locate Shaw's house and Trubel threatens him and attacks him with a machete, making him swear that he won't bother anyone again.

In Philadelphia, Josh Porter (Lucas Near-Verbrugghe) is attacked in his home by two Hundjägers and escapes. He calls Nick for help and he replies by telling him to leave Philadelphia. Meanwhile, Adalind is separated from Hofmann and begins experiencing severe hallucinations with Diana just before she arrives back at her cell. Nick, Hank and Monroe decide to inspect Gabriel's house to see if he is a Luison while he is in the courtroom. However, a second Gabriel appears in the house, forcing Monroe to leave the house.

Nick, Hank and Monroe discuss that Gabriel may have a twin and they decide to lure him out. Monroe attacks Gabriel's twin before two more twins appear. Nick and Hank hold them at gunpoint while Monroe states that the Wesen Council could get angry at this. They arrest the quadruplets soon after. Prince Viktor (Alexis Denisof) visits Adalind, who explains that she wants her child too. At Monroe's house, everyone celebrates while Nick confides to Monroe that he misses his Grimm powers and is pissed they were taken away. Just then, fire flames are heard. They go outside to find a Wolfsangel in fire outside the house. After Monroe, Rosalee and Hank leave, Juliette tells Nick that she is ready and he needs his powers back.

== Reception ==
=== Viewers ===
The episode was viewed by 5.43 million people, earning a 1.3/5 in the 18-49 rating demographics on the Nielson ratings scale, ranking third on its timeslot and sixth for the night in the 18-49 demographics, behind Last Man Standing, Blue Bloods, Hawaii Five-0, Dateline NBC, and Shark Tank. This was an 8% increase in viewership from the previous episode, which was watched by 5.01 million viewers with a 1.2/4. This means that 1.3 percent of all households with televisions watched the episode, while 5 percent of all households watching television at that time watched it. With DVR factoring in, the episode was watched by 8.25 million viewers and had a 2.4 ratings share in the 18-49 demographics.

=== Critical reviews ===
"Cry Luison" received positive reviews. Kathleen Wiedel from TV Fanatic, gave a 4 star rating out of 5, stating: "There's one of me, two of me, three of me, four of me... sorry, no more of me! The Luison quadruplets on Grimm Season 4 Episode 5 played on their identical looks to drive poor Eva to the point of insanity, and for a good portion of the episode you're left to wonder just how Gabriel was doing it!"

MaryAnn Sleasman from TV.com, wrote, "I know Grimm isn't the sort of show that really wants to get into the psychological aspect of what Adalind did to Nick, but to play off this whole situation as a sort of joke that essentially boils down to 'Adalind is crazy and Juliette is jealous' is a little bit naive and smacks of avoidance. The discomfort level is strong with this one."

Christine Horton of Den of Geek wrote, "Grimm's writers have hinted that this week and next week's episodes 'have decisions that can't be taken back and consequences that can't be foreseen'. Let's hope that bullet train of momentum powers through the rest of the season."
