= Headache (Grimm) =

- Grimm episode
- Episode no.: Season 4 Episode 21
- Directed by: Jim Kouf
- Written by: David Greenwalt; Jim Kouf
- Cinematography by: Fernando Arguelles
- Editing by: George Pilkinton
- Production code: 421
- Original air date: May 8, 2015
- Running time: 42 minutes

Guest appearances
- Nico Evers-Swindell as Kenneth Alun Goderich Bowes-Lyon; Jacqueline Toboni as Theresa "Trubel" Rubel; Philip Anthony-Rodriguez as Marcus Rispoli; Garcelle Beauvais as Henrietta; Danny Bruno as Bud Wurstner; Robert Blanche as Sgt. Franco

Episode chronology
| ← Previous "You Don't Know Jack" | Next → "Cry Havoc" |
- Grimm season 4

"Headache" is the 21st episode of season 4 of the supernatural drama television series Grimm and the 87th episode overall, which premiered on May 8, 2015, on NBC. The episode was written by series creators David Greenwalt and Jim Kouf and was directed by Kouf, making his directorial debut in the series.

== Plot ==
Nick (David Giuntoli) and Hank (Russell Hornsby) investigate a grisly murder and get closer to uncovering the identity of the vicious serial killer, while Wu's (Reggie Lee) life is in grave danger. Monroe (Silas Weir Mitchell) and Rosalee (Bree Turner) try to heal Captain Renard (Sasha Roiz) of his visions and bleeding. Juliette (Bitsie Tulloch) solidifies a new alliance as she works to get revenge, which gets Nick's mother killed. Elsewhere, Trubel (Jacqueline Toboni) is back in Portland from Philadelphia, as a surprise.

== Reception ==
=== Viewers ===
The episode was viewed by 4.21 million people, earning a 1.0/4 in the 18-49 rating demographics on the Nielson ratings scale, ranking third on its timeslot and eight for the night in the 18-49 demographics, behind The Amazing Race, Dateline NBC, two episodes of Hawaii Five-0, 20/20, Beyond the Tank, and Shark Tank. This was a slight decrease in viewership from the previous episode, which was watched by 4.22 million viewers with a 0.9/4. This means that 1.0 percent of all households with televisions watched the episode, while 4 percent of all households watching television at that time watched it.

=== Critical reviews ===
"Headache" received positive reviews. Les Chappell from The A.V. Club gave the episode an "A−" rating and wrote, "As the grades for the last few reviews indicate, Grimm has been going through a fairly terrific upswing late in its fourth season. It's interesting because that growth comes from two seemingly opposite sources, an acknowledgment of the show's mythology and its willingness to destroy parts of that mythology in ways that can't be excused with a wave of the hand. The moves to push Juliette and Adalind to opposite sides and eradicate both Nick's relationship with Juliette and the trailer have worked because of the level of familiarity we have, using callbacks and flashbacks to reinforce where we've come from and how far in another direction we've gone. It's made things more exciting than they've been in years, raising the question of how far is too far."

Kathleen Wiedel from TV Fanatic, gave a 3.8 star rating out of 5, stating: "I have to hand it to Nico Evers-Swindell: he sure makes you loathe Prince Kenneth, who I've mentally dubbed 'Ken Doll.' He imbues the character with that repulsive smugness, that self-satisfaction, and that particular twisted pleasure in causing other people pain. By the end of Grimm Season 4 Episode 21, Kenneth had achieved his main objective – capturing the Royal child, Diana. He and his Hunjagers even slew themselves a rogue Grimm. Did anyone expect to find anything but Kelly Burkhardt's head when Nick opened that cardboard box?"

MaryAnn Sleasman from TV.com, wrote, "After a string of great episodes, 'Headache' was uneven, messy, and generally not great in a few areas. However, like so many penultimate episodes, the real strengths in 'Heartache' [sic] lay in what the episode will contribute to the finale. Juliette's remorse will undoubtedly be the key to Nick, Hank, and the others infiltrating the Royals' defenses to get the wee baby Diana back. Despite this, Juliette's key role in Nick's mother's death will provide a whole new level of complications to their relationship. Or non-relationship, I mean, how do you come back from that?"

Christine Horton of Den of Geek wrote, "While dark, 'Headache' also offers up lots of action and a couple of genuine jaw-droppers. It also sets up the last episode of the season for some big explosions, with Nick running on vengeance. Nick, Renard and Adalind all have cause to look for payback, and you get the feeling next week's finale will deliver."
