= Heartbreaker (Grimm) =

- Grimm episode
- Episode no.: Season 4 Episode 16
- Directed by: Rob Bailey
- Written by: Dan E. Fesman
- Cinematography by: Eliot Rockett
- Editing by: Chris B. Willingham
- Production code: 416
- Original air date: April 3, 2015
- Running time: 42 minutes

Guest appearances
- Leah Renee as Bella Turner; Nico Evers-Swindell as Kenneth Alun Goderich Bowes-Lyon; Philip Anthony-Rodriguez as Marcus Rispoli

Episode chronology
← Previous "Double Date"	Next → "Hibernaculum"
- Grimm season 4

"Heartbreaker" is the 16th episode of season 4 of the supernatural drama television series Grimm and the 82nd episode overall, which premiered on April 3, 2015, on NBC. The episode was written by Dan E. Fesman and was directed by Rob Bailey.

== Plot ==
Opening quote: "How the silly frog does talk! He can be no companion to any human being!"

Nick (David Giuntoli) and Hank (Russell Hornsby) investigate the homicide of a cyclist named Zack found dead by a seemingly severe allergic reaction; they then meet an acquaintance of his, a 'Folterseele' (a golden/poison dart frog like wesen) named Bella Turner (Leah Renee) (inspired by the tale of The Frog Prince). According to Rosalee, Folterseele are a classically tragic - "always beautiful, always deadly" - type wesen, which are thankfully very rare as their skin secretes a highly poisonous deadly toxin poisonous touch which can kill, through no fault or intention of their own, with merely a single touch. They're also difficult to detect as they woge like no other Wesen, precipitated rather by sexual tension than emotion, usually via unwanted sexual advances. So, with help/advice from Rosalee & Monroe, Nick & Hank attempt to find a better solution rather than merely just locking her up.

When a new member of the Royal family shows up in Portland, Captain Renard (Sasha Roiz) and Adalind (Claire Coffee) realize the Royal family have stepped up their efforts to find Diana. This new Royal, Kenneth, is certainly not one to be trifled with. When Adalind attempts to pass off her second pregnancy as of royal conception, soon realises Kenneth is not one so easily fooled. Renard's undercover double-agent Sam, on passing on unsatisfactory info, is also quickly thwarted and killed.

A volatile Juliette (Bitsie Tulloch), conflicted by her new Hexenbiest state, threatens Renard that he best find a solution as she wants her life back. When she finally returns home, regardless of Nick's pleading to the contrary, she informs him she's moving out; seemingly still holding Nick partly responsible for her unwanted predicament. Later she ponders whether to embrace her new self or attempt to get rid of it.

Bella Turner is attacked at her work place by another man from the cycling group. He also dies from her poison. She goes to her mother's house and hides in the barn. Her mother finds her and tries to comfort her. Inside the house her grandmother is heating up a branding iron. The mother and grandmother fight over the branding iron. The grandmother knocks the mother out. Nick and Hank arrive just in time to save Bella from having her face burned by her grandmother. They take Bella to the spice shop and offer her their cure for her toxin warning her that they don't know if it will work or what side effects it will have. She says it is better than never being able to touch someone who loves you, and drinks the potion.

When Renard finally meets Kenneth he finds he's more than met his match. He forcefully informs Renard he's been tasked with finding his daughter, then threatens Renard that if he doesn't join forces he'll end up like his late friend Damerov - and the King minus another son.

The episode ends "3 weeks later… at a nice restaurant somewhere in The Pearl." At a table, two people we can't really see are on their first date. The man talks about how nervous he is. The camera pans up to reveal Bella with green bumpy skin. She asks if he's sure he isn't bothered by the way she looks. Then we see that her date has facial tattoos and piercings, he replies: "I think you're a knockout!"...

== Reception ==
=== Viewers ===
The episode was viewed by an estimated 4.51 million people, earning a 1.0/4 in the 18-49 rating demographics on the Nielson ratings scale, ranking third on its timeslot and sixth for the night in the 18-49 demographics, behind Cristela, Shark Tank, Last Man Standing, Hawaii Five-0, Dateline NBC, The Amazing Race, and Blue Bloods. This was a 9% decrease in viewership from the previous episode, which was watched by 4.93 million viewers with a 1.0/4. This means that 1.0 percent of all households with televisions watched the episode, while 4 percent of all households watching television at that time watched it. With DVR factoring in, the episode was watched by 6.99 million viewers and had a 1.9 ratings share in the 18-49 demographics.

=== Critical reviews ===
"Heartbreaker" received positive reviews. Les Chappell from The A.V. Club gave the episode a "B" rating and wrote, "'Heartbreaker' is another episode to explore the more unfortunate side of being a Wesen, with a take on the tale of The Frog Prince. Except in this version, however, it's not a frog turning into a prince but a young bicyclist named Bella who turns into a frog-like Wesen in the presence of sexual attraction, and one who produces a highly potent toxin in response to said attractions. Of the various effort to explore the dark side of the Wesen world, this is one of the more effective deployments because of how little control Bella has over what happens. She can't control her poisonous reactions any more than she can control the men who find her attractive, with both the good and bad ones meeting the same gruesome fate when they try to get too close."

Kathleen Wiedel from TV Fanatic, gave a 2.5 star rating out of 5, stating: "It's really rather strange that no one apparently had tried to find solutions for that minor biological issue before now. Are Monroe and Rosalee the only two people on the planet who can come up with this stuff?"

MaryAnn Sleasman from TV.com, wrote, "'Heartbreaker' introduced some new faces as Grimm heads toward its Season 4 homestretch. Here's hoping that Kenneth's lack of patience gets this whole AWOL baby thing moving. I can't believe it's been drawn out for this long."

Christine Horton of Den of Geek wrote, "The upshot of the Folterseele story is that there's someone for everyone. Also it's important to look beyond the superficial and see the real person underneath the skin – something with which Nick has been struggling. But even if he were to look beyond Juliette's decaying skin and skeletal features, right now there's not much better underneath."
