= Iron Hans (Grimm) =

- Grimm episode
- Episode no.: Season 4 Episode 19
- Directed by: Sebastian Silva
- Written by: David Greenwalt; Jim Kouf
- Cinematography by: Fernando Arguelles
- Editing by: Chris B. Willingham
- Production code: 419
- Original air date: April 24, 2015
- Running time: 42 minutes

Guest appearances
- Jeff Fahey as Albert Bowden; Nico Evers-Swindell as Kenneth Alun Goderich Bowes-Lyon; Hillary Tuck as Maggie Bowden; Robert Blanche as Sgt. Franco

Episode chronology
← Previous "Mishipeshu"	Next → "You Don't Know Jack"
- Grimm season 4

"Iron Hans" is the 19th episode of season 4 of the supernatural drama television series Grimm and the 85th episode overall, which premiered on April 24, 2015, on the cable network NBC. The episode was written by David Greenwalt and Jim Kouf and was directed by Sebastian Silva.

== Plot ==
Nick (David Giuntoli) and Hank (Russell Hornsby) investigate a homicide and they learn it's connected to an age-old Wesen rite of passage. Meanwhile, Juliette (Bitsie Tulloch) meets a surprising ally. Captain Sean Renard (Sasha Roiz) battles the darkness within and Nick finds hope for Juliette in the last person he expected: Adalind (Claire Coffee).

== Reception ==
=== Viewers ===
The episode was viewed by 4.66 million people, earning a 1.0/4 in the 18-49 rating demographics on the Nielson ratings scale, ranking third on its timeslot and sixth for the night in the 18-49 demographics, behind Blue Bloods, The Amazing Race, Hawaii Five-0, Shark Tank, and a Bruce Jenner interview. This was a 2% increase in viewership from the previous episode, which was watched by 4.54 million viewers with a 1.0/4. This means that 1.0 percent of all households with televisions watched the episode, while 4 percent of all households watching television at that time watched it. With DVR factoring in, the episode was watched by 6.71 million viewers and had a 1.8 ratings share in the 18-49 demographics.

=== Critical reviews ===
"Iron Hans" received positive reviews. Les Chappell from The A.V. Club gave the episode an "A−" rating and wrote, "The decision to burn things down literally and metaphorically caps off what's easily the strongest episode of Grimm since the show returned from hiatus, and also a contender for best episode of the season. I've regularly complained about how the multiple plotlines have made it hard to focus on any one thing at a time, and 'Iron Hans' benefits from both narrative and thematic tightness. Characters are interacting with each other rather than heading off on random adventures, history between them pays off in satisfying fashion, and for the first time in a while it feels like there's a destination for the madness."

Kathleen Wiedel from TV Fanatic, gave a 4 star rating out of 5, stating: "The snark is alive and well in Portland! It seemed like everyone had something to say in Grimm Season 4 Episode 19, 'Iron Hans.' Seriously, some of their quips had me in stitches! The writers were on fire for the one-liners, I have to say."

MaryAnn Sleasman from TV.com, wrote, "Destroying the trailer thrusts Nick back into the world of the unknown. It removes the complacency and confidence that came with having every answer at his fingertips. Wesen are suddenly mysterious and frightening again. This is the sort of move we'd expect in a season finale (eh, close enough, right?) and in the context of Grimm itself, it couldn't have come at a better time—or a worse time, if you're Nick."

Christine Horton of Den of Geek wrote, "So new allegiances are formed, and old bridges burned (among other things.) This feels like the tipping point for this season so far, so let's hope it delivers in these last few episodes."
