= Thanks for the Memories (Grimm) =

- Grimm episode
- Episode no.: Season 4 Episode 1
- Directed by: Norberto Barba
- Written by: Jim Kouf; David Greenwalt
- Cinematography by: Fernando Argüelles
- Editing by: Chris Willingham
- Production code: 401
- Original air date: October 24, 2014
- Running time: 42 minutes

Guest appearances
- Jacqueline Toboni as Theresa "Trubel" Rubel; Alexis Denisof as Prince Viktor Chlodwig zu Schellendorf von Konigsburg; Elizabeth Rodriguez as Katrina Chavez; Louise Lombard as Elizabeth Lascelles; Brian Letscher as Lawrence Anderson; Philip Anthony-Rodriguez as Marcus Rispoli; Robert Blanche as Sgt. Franco

Episode chronology
← Previous "Blond Ambition"	Next → "Octopus Head"
- Grimm season 4

"Thanks for the Memories" is the 1st episode and season premiere of season 4 of the supernatural drama television series Grimm and the 67th episode overall, which premiered on October 24, 2014, on the broadcast network NBC. The episode was written by series creators David Greenwalt and Jim Kouf and was directed by Norberto Barba.

== Plot ==
Opening quote: "Knowledge is power."

Renard (Sasha Roiz) is placed in emergency treatment and doctors begin surgery on him. Having left the wedding in Renard's car, Hank (Russell Hornsby) informs the others about his status. Trubel also informs them about the situation with Steward when she had to kill him. They arrive at Nick's house to find police officers surrounding it. Nick (David Giuntoli) assures Trubel that she killed Steward in self-defense and there's nothing to worry about as she can tell them the truth about what happened.

Somewhere in Portland, a man named Lawrence Anderson is standing outside a house while memories begin to circulate in his head. He knocks on the door and Henry Slocombe (Rodney Sherwood) opens. They begin talking about a colleague's accident when Lawrence woges into an octopus-like Wesen and attacks Henry with the tentacles on his head. He ends up leaving him confused and tries to leave with his things when Slocombe's girlfriend arrives, forcing him to kill her and escape. Back at the house, Trubel begins to tell Wu (Reggie Lee) and Sgt. Franco about what happened in the house when FBI agents arrive.

Agent Katrina Chavez and Agent Doug Rosten (Cobey Mandarino) question Trubel about the incident and ask her to come to the station in order to make a statement.

In Vienna, Prince Viktor is notified of Renard's shooting and Steward's death and has to report it to the King, while he is uncertain if Nick was involved in the events.

Meanwhile, Lawrence contacts a businessman to come and help him with what happened. Before meeting him, Lawrence uses the knowledge he retrieved from Slocombe and accesses his work to retrieve data.

Agent Chavez discovers Trubel's Grimm entries and woges into a Steinadler and talks to Rosten about Trubel, seeing that she may not be normal after all.

Nick's house is vacated by the police and, that night, Juliette is visited by Monroe (Silas Weir Mitchell) and Rosalee (Bree Turner). Juliette gets mad at seeing that she made them miss their honeymoon.

In the station, Nick and Hank discuss Adalind's arrival in Vienna, deducing that she may have made a deal involving Nick so she could get her baby back.

Trubel is finally released after her statement confirms the facts of the crime. Hank then visits Renard, who just finished having surgery. Hank is informed by a doctor that there is too much blood loss and that Renard may still be in danger. Hank then talks to Wu, who brings up Nick's book and the memories of the Aswang. Just then, the nurse tells them that they should call Renard's next of kin in case anything goes wrong.

Chavez is informed that Steward's last call was to a company named GQR Industries and a suitcase was brought to the office from his car. In the suitcase they find passports and money. They decide to check the bank accounts.

Nick, Hank and Trubel check the Grimms' entries to find out information about the Wesen and discover they're dealing with a Gedächtnis Esser, an octopus-like Wesen who steals his victims' memories with his tentacles.

Lawrence meets with the businessman and gives him an equation he retrieved from Slocombe's research, stating it's related to the CVA Project. However, Lawrence is taken into custody after new evidence resurfaces.

Nick and Hank interrogate Lawrence but as his story is convincing, he is released and leaves the station. When he leaves the station, he is "assaulted" by a disguised Trubel, who sees him woging. She then goes with Nick and Hank to confirm for them that he is a Gedächtnis Esser and sets off to follow him.

Meanwhile, in the hospital, Renard flatlines and the doctors shock him with the paddles. A woman (Louise Lombard) is seen watching while the doctors are unable to revive him and declare 1:34 P.M. as the time of death.

== Reception ==
=== Viewers ===
The episode was viewed by 5.28 million people, earning a 1.4/5 in the 18–49 rating demographics on the Nielson ratings scale. This was a 2% decrease in viewership from the previous episode, which was watched by 5.34 million viewers with a 1.3/4 and it's also a 15% decrease in viewership from the previous season premiere, which was watched by 6.15 million viewers with a 1.8/6. This means that 1.4 percent of all households with televisions watched the episode, while 5 percent of all households watching television at that time watched it. With DVR factoring in, the episode was watched by 8.06 million viewers with a 2.4 ratings share in the 18–49 demographics.

=== Critical reviews ===
"Thanks for the Memories" received mostly positive reviews. Kathleen Wiedel from TV Fanatic, gave a 4.5 star rating out of 5, stating: "Hang onto your hats, folks, because Grimm Season 4 Episode 1 kept the tension as taut as a high wire! Our heroes have had little enough time to breathe, let alone come to terms with everything that happened in the Grimm Season 3 finale."

MaryAnn Sleasman from TV.com, wrote, "Grimm has been moving toward a more mature take on the monsters-among-us trope for at least the last two seasons by expanding on the cultural, social, and historical aspects of Wesen, Grimm, and everything in between. While Grimm may have initially identified itself as primarily a cop show with a twist, the world it has created is vast and capable of so much more than supernatural cops chasing monster robbers."

Christine Horton of Den of Geek wrote, "After last season’s wedding-themed cliff-hanger, Grimm season 4 kicks off with Nick having lost his powers to detect Wesen and Captain Renard fighting for his life after being shot by the rogue Hundjäger, Steward."
