= Octopus Head =

- Grimm episode
- Episode no.: Season 4 Episode 2
- Directed by: Terrence O'Hara
- Written by: Jim Kouf; David Greenwalt
- Cinematography by: Eliot Rockett
- Editing by: George Pilkinton
- Production code: 402
- Original air date: October 31, 2014
- Running time: 42 minutes

Guest appearances
- Jacqueline Toboni as Theresa "Trubel" Rubel; Alexis Denisof as Prince Viktor Chlodwig zu Schellendorf von Konigsburg; Elizabeth Rodriguez as Katrina Chavez; Louise Lombard as Elizabeth Lascelles; Brian Letscher as Timothy Perkal; Philip Anthony-Rodriguez as Marcus Rispoli

Episode chronology
← Previous "Thanks for the Memories"	Next → "The Last Fight"
- Grimm season 4

"Octopus Head" is the second episode of season 4 of the supernatural drama television series Grimm and the 68th episode overall, which premiered on October 31, 2014, on the broadcast network NBC. The episode was written by series creators David Greenwalt and Jim Kouf and was directed by Terrence O'Hara.

== Plot ==
Opening quote: "A man's real possession is his memory. In nothing else is he rich, In nothing else he is poor."

Renard (Sasha Roiz) is pronounced dead when a woman (Louise Lombard) enters the room and uses her powers to freeze time. She takes out a red & black snake with two heads, one at each end, and makes each snake bite their respective hearts, which makes Renard's skin get back to normal while the woman's skin turns pale. After finishing their part, the snakes disintegrate to ash while the woman collapses, as time goes back to normal. When the doctor checks on her, Renard suddenly, once again alive, wakes up.

In Vienna, Prince Viktor (Alexis Denisof) is told by Rispoli (Philip Anthony-Rodriguez) that Steward's accounts have been hidden to avoid their involvement with him and he is also informed that Adalind (Claire Coffee) has arrived. She is demanding to get inside the castle to get her daughter back (thinking Viktor has her). He brings her inside and tells her about Renard's shooting before throwing her in a cell. He reveals he doesn't have her daughter, that the resistance she betrayed him for and helped her escape, took her; also that she can "huff & puff" all she likes but the cell was designed to contain Hexenbiests, she won't be escaping it. He is planning on leaving her there until she reveals the people who helped her escape.

Back in Portland, Trubel (Jacqueline Toboni) is following Anderson (Brian Letscher) to the hotel as he is checking in. Inside, he disguises himself to resemble the man whose memories he previously stole, by dyeing his hair. She contacts Nick (David Giuntoli) and Hank (Russell Hornsby) to tell them what she knows before returning to watch him.

In the spice shop, Monroe (Silas Weir Mitchell) and Rosalee (Bree Turner) are investigating a possible "Verfluchte Zwillingsschwester", a spell used by Hexenbiests to remove the powers of a Grimm. They deduce that Renard may know how it works since he had the antidote.

A man named Ken Vickers (Andrew Stearns) calls Slocombe to meet up with him, not knowing he's dead. Lawrence calls Kent back to meet with him to discuss Slocombe's research and makes a change of his physical appearance before leaving the hotel. Trubel, outside the door, listens to the conversation then follows him to his next victim.

Renard is visited by the mysterious woman, who is revealed to be his mother, Elizabeth Lascelles. He informs her about Adalind's baby and that Steward is responsible for his injury. She's rather delighted to be a grandmother.

Nick and Hank contact Lawrence's supervisor and discover that he suffered an accident a few weeks back and is suffering dementia, the same symptom the victims are experiencing. Nick is then questioned by Chavez (Elizabeth Rodriguez) about his recent activities and suspecting he's a Grimm, provokes him by wogeing, which Nick is unable to see. After he leaves, she makes a call to tell that he is not the Grimm but she is now certain who is. Trubel follows Lawrence to Vickers' house, whom he knocks out unconscious. He then notices Trubel outside the house and knocks her out too.

In her cell, Adalind is awoken by a bunch of large rats, then hears a sinister giggle then voice coming from a hole in the wall, who says when she asks who it is : "My name is for me to know and you to find out", before closing the hole back up.

Nick and Hank burst into Lawrence's hotel room to find the next address and find Vickers' address. Lawrence wakes Trubel up and after inspecting Vickers, uses his tentacles to retrieve information from her. However, he sees that she is a Grimm and suffers a breakdown as he absorbs her memories of abuse, fights and killings. Nick and Hank arrive just in the 'nick' of time and arrest Lawrence. Despite their contact with him, Trubel and Vickers are thankfully still safe and sound. In the station, they find that his real name is Timothy Perkal, a Canadian spy who is wanted in various countries. In his cell, the spy is still suffering agonising nightmares.

Nick and Hank then visit Renard in the hospital and also meet his mother Elizabeth. The next morning, Trubel (who is in an excited mood) leaves the house on Juliette's (Bitsie Tulloch) bike just as Wu (Reggie Lee) visits Nick. He is still confused that Trubel is a criminology student and is also suspect of homicide and wants Nick to explain all the discrepancies to him. Suddenly, Nick experiences a severe headache while Adalind receives the same headache in her cell. They are seeing each other's sight and after a moment, they go back to normal. Both can't explain what is going on. Trubel is seen riding on the bike when a following van pulls over and takes her inside. Agent Chavez is revealed to be in the passenger seat and tells the driver to go.

== Reception ==
=== Viewers ===
The episode was viewed by 4.54 million people, earning a 1.1/4 in the 18–49 rating demographics on the Nielson ratings scale, ranking third on its timeslot and eight for the night in the 18–49 demographics, behind The Amazing Race, Hawaii Five-0, Blue Bloods, Last Man Standing, Dateline NBC, 20/20, and Shark Tank. This was a 15% decrease in viewership from the previous episode, which was watched by 5.28 million viewers with a 1.4/5. This means that 1.1 percent of all households with televisions watched the episode, while 4 percent of all households watching television at that time watched it. With DVR factoring in, the episode was watched by 7.21 million viewers with a 2.1 ratings share in the 18–49 demographics.

=== Critical reviews ===
"Octopus Head" received positive reviews. Kathleen Wiedel from TV Fanatic, gave a 3.8 star rating out of 5, stating: "And what is Chavez up to, anyway? I suspect this is one of those slow-burn, long-term plot threads that will only really be fully revealed over the long haul, but I doubt she has friendly intentions overall. Nice people don't go around kidnapping folks off the street, after all. On the other hand, most Wesen are scared of Grimms, and Trubel had just decapitated a Hundjager."

MaryAnn Sleasman from TV.com, wrote, "'Octopus Head' brought back Renard and locked Adalind up in a spooky dungeon while also continuing Season 4's apparent domesticity theme with the Nick-Juliette-Trubel stuff. It's an interesting role reversal to pit our Wesen characters against the big bad while our Grimm mostly struggles with more mundane problems like relationships and stray children and the challenge of maintaining a true work/life balance. This episode was a strong follow-up to last week's season opener. I'm so pumped for this season. Are you?"

Christine Horton of Den of Geek wrote, "There was a continuation of last week's Wesen storyline about the Octo-man, but it really felt secondary to the developing plot lines among the main characters – although it strengthened Trubel's new position as the only crime fighting Grimm in town. I look forward to the next episode, particularly after this installment ended on a cliff-hanger that I think will prompt some a number of truths to be revealed next week."
