= Trial by Fire (Grimm) =

- Grimm episode
- Episode no.: Season 4 Episode 13
- Directed by: Norberto Barba
- Written by: Sean Calder
- Cinematography by: Fernando Arguelles
- Editing by: Chris B. Willingham
- Production code: 413
- Original air date: February 13, 2015
- Running time: 42 minutes

Guest appearances
- Daniel Roebuck as Lt. Peter Orson; Alexis Denisof as Prince Viktor Chlodwig zu Schellendorf von Konigsburg; Gideon Emery as Damien Barso; Hank Harris as Andy Harrison; Philip Anthony-Rodriguez as Marcus Rispoli

Episode chronology
← Previous "Maréchaussée"	Next → "Bad Luck"
- Grimm season 4

"Trial by Fire" is the 13th episode of season 4 of the supernatural drama television series Grimm and the 79th episode overall, which premiered on February 13, 2015, on the cable network NBC. The episode was written by Sean Calder and was directed by Norberto Barba.

== Plot ==
Two young employees stay late at Harrison's Outfitters, when Damien Barso (Gideon Emery) uses a key to enter the building. He generates fire from his body and sets fire to the building. The two employees are trapped in the office and when they discover the fire, it is too late to escape.

Nick, Hank and Wu are called in to investigate the deaths of the young folk. They meet John Harrison (John Murray), the owner of the store, and his son Andy (Hank Harris), whom John is grooming to take over the business, which has been in the family for three generations.

Lt. Willis (Jessica Caesar), the arson investigator, draws their attention to the weird nature of the fire. It seemed to start with the breaker box, but instead of following the ventilation system, seemed to walk through the building, turning corners. The only time it behaved like a normal fire was when the young employees broke the window of the office in an attempt to escape, providing oxygen to the flames, which crisped them.

Suspecting wesen involvement, Nick tasks Wu with looking for similar cases. He finds several and learns that they were being investigated by Bauerschwein arson investigator Lt. Peter Orson (Daniel Roebuck), whom Nick had put behind bars for murder in Season 1's fifth episode (The Three Bad Wolves). Visiting Orson in prison, Nick and Hank learn that Orson had actually seen the arsonist, but did not know his name. Orson convinces them to let him out (with tracking ankle bracelet) to help them.

Adalind (Claire Coffee) is keen to visit Nick and Juliette to get her daughter back, but Prince Viktor (Alexis Denisof) counsels diplomacy. To illustrate his point, he introduces Adalind to Sam Damerov (Kenajuan Bentley), with whom Sean Reynard (Sasha Roiz) has entrusted the information that he has on Kelly Burkhardt's (Mary Elizabeth Mastrantonio) whereabouts. Damerov reports the information to Viktor.

Learning that the Harrison's business was facing Chapter 7 bankruptcy, Nick and Hank visit Charles Laney (Allen Galli), the Harrison's lawyer. After they have gone, Laney alerts Barso, telling him that the deaths of the young people has elevated the intensity of the investigation. He and Barso meet in Laney's car. Laney advises Barso to kill his client so that he cannot be identified. Barso responds by setting fire to Laney and steps out of the car, which explodes soon after.

They learn that he is an excandesco through the trailer library, but the Grimm who wrote of an excandesco's role in the burning of Rome during Nero's reign was unsuccessful in his attempt to kill the excandesco responsible due to the extreme heat.

Nick, Hank and Orson visit Rosalee (Bree Turner) and Monroe (Silas Weir Mitchell) in the spice shop in the hope of finding a way to stop Barson. Monroe is enraged by their bringing Orson with them, as Orson had killed his friend. Rosalee gets Monroe to settle down, and he ultimately agrees to help. They decide that an ointment might be a way of stopping Barson. Rosalee and Monroe set about making it in sufficient quantity.

With Orson's help, Nick and Hank identify Barson and set about tracking him. In the meantime, we learn that Barso's last client was Andy Harrison, who does not want to take over a failing business from his father. Barso lures John Harrison to the burned store, pretending to be an arson investigator with news. When John Harrison turns up, he captures him and uses him as bait to get Andy to the store.

Nick, Hank and Orson, on finding Laney's body, have decided that Barso is killing the people who can identify him. Rosalee and Monroe have settled on large water guns as a means of delivering the ointment.

Nick and Hank go to the Harrison house, thinking that John Harrison hired Barso and is therefore at risk, but they find Andy Harrison leaving to go to the store. He confesses that it was he, not his father, who engaged Barso and that it is he whom Barso wants to kill.

Nick, Hank, Orson, Monroe and Rosalee, with Andy Harrison, converge on the store with the ointment-filled water guns. Orson volunteers to be bait to draw Barso away from John Harrison, whom Nick and Hank free. Then Barso, chasing Orson, exits the store to find himself surrounded. Unaware of the efficacy of their water guns, he woges to kill them, and they squirt the ointment over him, sealing him inside his own fire. He explodes.

While this is happening, Adalind turns up at Nick and Juliette's house, and confronts Juliette. Juliette tells her to leave, but Adalind woges into her hexenbiest form. Juliette responds in kind, and the ensuing battle severely damages the furniture. Fearing for her life, Adalind flees and breaks down in her car. Nick comes home to find the mess and Juliette finally has the courage to show him that she is now a hexenbiest.

== Reception ==
=== Viewers ===
The episode was viewed by 4.86 million people, earning a 1.1/4 in the 18-49 rating demographics on the Nielson ratings scale, ranking third on its timeslot and sixth for the night in the 18-49 demographics, behind 20/20, Undercover Boss, Hawaii Five-0, Blue Bloods, and Shark Tank. This was a 4% decrease in viewership from the previous episode, which was watched by 4.67 million viewers with a 1.2/4. This means that 1.1 percent of all households with televisions watched the episode, while 4 percent of all households watching television at that time watched it. With DVR factoring in, the episode was watched by 7.79 million viewers and had a 2.2 ratings share in the 18-49 demographics.

=== Critical reviews ===
"Trial by Fire" received mostly positive reviews. Kathleen Wiedel from TV Fanatic, gave a 4.5 star rating out of 5, stating: "Talk about burying the lede! We had to wait until the last five minutes of Grimm Season 4 Episode 13 for the long-awaited Adalind/Juliette showdown, but it was worth it. We were also treated to a nice bit of continuity with the return of Daniel Roebuck as the (jailed) Bauerschwein arson investigator Peter Orson, last seen back in Grimm Season 1 Episode 6."

MaryAnn Sleasman from TV.com, wrote, "Grimm itself has moved beyond its beginnings as a quirky little show about the stuff of fairy tales run amok, and nowadays it very eagerly explores what could easily be seen as a parallel for cultural assimilation, immigration, and the role of tradition in an everchanging world. The best parts of 'Trial by Fire' were the interactions between Orson and Nick and Orson and Monroe."

Christine Horton of Den of Geek wrote, "And so begins the biestfight we're all been waiting for – where Juliette substitutes a fortune in therapy sessions for an explosive fight with Adalind that shows us what the newly-formed Hexenbiest has really got. The two really go at it, smashing Nick and Juliette's living room to pieces once again. (It makes you wonder if their neighbours are extremely tolerant, of just hard of hearing.)"
