= The Last Fight (Grimm) =

- Grimm episode
- Episode no.: Season 4 Episode 3
- Directed by: Paul Kaufman
- Written by: Thomas Ian Griffith
- Cinematography by: Fernando Argüelles
- Editing by: Ray Daniels III
- Production code: 403
- Original air date: November 7, 2014
- Running time: 42 minutes

Guest appearances
- Jacqueline Toboni as Theresa "Trubel" Rubel; Louise Lombard as Elizabeth Lascelles; Elizabeth Rodriguez as Katrina Chavez; Ron Canada as Stan Kingston; LisaGay Hamilton as Delores Pittman; Arlen Escarpeta as Clay Pittman; James Martin Kelly as Abe Tucker; Danny Bruno as Bud Wurstner; David Ury as Hofmann

Episode chronology
← Previous "Octopus Head"	Next → "Dyin' on a Prayer"
- Grimm season 4

"The Last Fight" is the third episode of season 4 of the supernatural drama television series Grimm and the 69th episode overall, which premiered on November 7, 2014, on the cable network NBC. The episode was written by Thomas Ian Griffith and was directed by Paul Kaufman.

== Plot ==
Opening quote: "Stars, hide your fires; let not light see my black and deep desires."

After seeing what Adalind (Claire Coffee) was seeing, the dungeon, and not knowing the cause, Nick (David Giuntoli) is taken to the hospital for a checkup. In a warehouse, Trubel (Jacqueline Toboni) is confronted by Chavez (Elizabeth Rodriguez), who finally confirms that she is a Grimm. Chavez enquires if Nick is aware of what she is, then explains that her gifts are very valuable and should not be wasted. They reveal themselves to be collaborating with a group to stop any Wesen threat just like her and attempt to recruit her services, offering her a home of people with the same goal. They ask her to think about it, to not disclose their meeting, then let her go just to prove their loyalty.

Nick's girlfriend Juliette drags him to get checked out at the doctors, to make sure there's no lasting damage from Adalind's potion. The ophthalmologist discovers Nick was born with an extra retinal cone, which allows him special vision. (It seems now that his 'Grimm-ness' has been removed, the area that allowed him his 'Wesen-sight' is swollen & suffering the damage.)

In a boxing match, Stan Kingston (Ron Canada) pays three men to beat up a boxer, Clay Pittman (Arlen Escarpeta), when he woges into a bull-like Wesen and beats them right back. One of the guys that got a broken jaw at the batting-assault, threatens to report them if he's not given $25,000 in compensation. When he goes to pick up the money, he's suddenly dragged out the car window and violently attacked. Abe Tucker (James Martin Kelly) then has Clay go to the fight and in an aggressive manner, and superior Wesen power, knocks out his opponent.

In the spice shop, Monroe (Silas Weir Mitchell), Rosalee (Bree Turner) and Hank (Russell Hornsby) are still discussing a solution to Nick's powers when Bud (Danny Bruno) appears and asks about Trubel, as the Wesen community is now confused and all in a panic after the events at the wedding. They tell him to not tell anyone, but that Nick has lost his Grimm-powers.

At a new police murder scene, the victim dragged out of a lake is one Bobby (aka Robert 'Bang-bang' Moore), a petty criminal - the boxing-mad previous blackmailer. Officer Wu again urgently attempts to talk to Nick, which he again evades until later. At the hospital Elizabeth questions her son (Renard) on the whereabouts of her granddaughter which he kind of evades. When Rosalee and Monroe visit Renard, they discuss the 'Nick-no-longer-Grimm' problem and Elizabeth offers to help - “To beat a Hexenbiest like Adalind, you need a Hexenbiest like me.” The three manage to hunt down Adalind's secret storage space and attempt to replicate her potion to reverse Nick's condition.

Trubel joins up with the boxing gym, undercover, and meets up with Clay. The suspicious coach Kingston, sets Trubel up with a nearby female boxer, easily double her size, to check what she's capable of. After initially getting the better of Trubel, once she sees her opponent woge, fighting dirty Trubel ultimately manages to knock her out. Later, whilst eavesdropping, Trubel realises both trainer and coach are indeed two different bull-like Wesen. Clay tells Abe he wants out of boxing, but Kingston threatens to tell the police that Clay killed Moore (which Clay wrongly suspected he had) if he doesn't continue fighting for him.

In Adalind's cell, the giggling creepy guy next door discloses via a riddle a stone Adalind is to move if she wishes to join him in an escape. He seems to know about her missing baby and helps her escape via various secret escape tunnels. Meanwhile, Renard's mother finds the spell Adalind used, and they head to the spice shop to make a reversing potion. Nick and crew find the type of Wesen Kingston is in the book, and the description of the wounds this Wesen inflicts match the wounds on Moore. When they find out they go off to confront Kingston (Stan) they first discover they have a new victim - it's Abe, who's been thrown off a roof but sporting the same puncture wounds earlier found on Moore. In his pocket Nick finds a suspicious 'suicide note' confessing to the murders. When Nick, Hank and Trubel confront Kingston, they tell him they know he's a Wesen and in fact the actual killer. He looks into Nick's eyes and denies knowing what they're talking about, but then is attacked by Trubel and sees she's the Grimm. All three have a good knock-about but ultimately Trubel is able to get the better of Kingston by ripping off one of his horns and breaking his neck.

Inside the gym, when Clay confronts his mother and admits that he no longer wishes to keep fighting matches, in a shocking twist of events, his mother admits she's behind hiring his coach and trainer; she then suddenly woges, smashes a nearby wooden chair and viciously beats him with a broken off chair leg, insisting that he needs to continue doing what he was born to do! A surprised, totally crestfallen yet angry Clay ultimately stands up to her when Trubel comes to his defense and tells him he doesn't need to do what she's forcing him to do as now both Abe and Kingston are dead. When the mother insists Clay kill the Grimm, knowing Trubel was kind to him before, he instead turns on his mother; then in anger instead bashes his own fighting arm/wrist so he's no longer able to box, finally telling his mother : "I'm done!" (Seeing the damage she's wreaked, the whimpering mother seems remorseful, but it's left unsure if she's truly sad for her son or what she's done, or for his fighting ability/career now wreaked and the money he brought in which supported her).

== Reception ==
=== Viewers ===
The episode was viewed by 4.93 million people, earning a 1.3/4 in the 18-49 rating demographics on the Nielson ratings scale, ranking second on its timeslot and sixth for the night in the 18-49 demographics, behind Last Man Standing, Blue Bloods, Dateline NBC, 20/20, and Shark Tank. This was an 8% increase in viewership from the previous episode, which was watched by 4.54 million viewers with a 1.1/4. This means that 1.3 percent of all households with televisions watched the episode, while 4 percent of all households watching television at that time watched it. With DVR factoring in, the episode was watched by 7.65 million viewers with a 2.4 ratings share in the 18-49 demographics.

=== Critical reviews ===
"The Last Fight" received mixed reviews. Kathleen Wiedel from TV Fanatic, gave a 3 star rating out of 5, stating: "For such an apparently case-oriented episode, Grimm Season 4 Episode 3 was a serious let-down: no real mystery, no suspense, not even any red herrings."

MaryAnn Sleasman from TV.com, wrote, "In 'Last Fight,' Grimm wasted no time in tearing apart any delusions that Nick's missing powers were a good thing, focusing on a clever group of Wesen who'd figured out how to use that whole humans-can't-see-us thing to their advantage by fixing boxing matches—the trick was simply to pit much more powerful Wesen fighters against unassuming human ones."

Christine Horton of Den of Geek wrote, "This week’s episode of Grimm, Last Fight, seemed a little more filler than killer. As much as you can't expect lightning - fast plot developments and wall-to-wall action every week, you should be able to come away with more at the end of the episode than a shrug and a hope that next week's is better."
