= Headache (disambiguation) =

A headache is an unpleasant sensation in the head.

Headache may also refer to:

- Headache (game), a board game
- Headache (EP), an extended-play music recording by Big Black
- Headache, a single album by Moon Jong-up
- Headache, a musical project by the producer Vegyn
- Headache (journal), a medical journal
- "Headache" (song), a 1994 song by Frank Black
- "Headache" (Grimm), a 2015 episode of the television series Grimm
