= Maréchaussée (Grimm) =

- Grimm episode
- Episode no.: Season 4 Episode 12
- Directed by: Eric Laneuville
- Written by: David Greenwalt; Jim Kouf
- Cinematography by: Eliot Rockett
- Editing by: Scott Boyd
- Production code: 412
- Original air date: February 6, 2015
- Running time: 42 minutes

Guest appearances
- Arnold Vosloo as Jonathon Wilde; Garcelle Beauvais as Henrietta; Alexis Denisof as Prince Viktor Chlodwig zu Schellendorf von Konigsburg; Philip Anthony-Rodriguez as Marcus Rispoli

Episode chronology
← Previous "Death Do Us Part"	Next → "Trial by Fire"
- Grimm season 4

"Maréchaussée" is the 12th episode of season 4 of the supernatural drama television series Grimm and the 78th episode overall, which premiered on February 6, 2015, on NBC. The episode was written by series creators David Greenwalt and Jim Kouf and was directed by Eric Laneuville.

== Plot ==
Opening quote: "Everyone sees what you appear to be, few experience what you really are."

Nick (David Giuntoli) and Hank (Russell Hornsby) investigate the murders of two coyotl fortune tellers named László (Corey Brunish) & Mabel Kurlon (Dana Green). László woges into a character he calls "Fadó" in order to convince the client (Anne) that he is channeling her late husband. The Wesen Council has hired the maréchaussée to eliminate László and Mabel for woging to in public, for profit.

Nick, Hank and Wu identify the killer as a "manticore", which morphs into a scorpion-like creature. The manticore bounty hunter named Jonathon Wilde (Arnold Vosloo) fulfills a second contract, a pimp who uses his wesen form to keep his girls in line. He makes the mistake of tossing his victim's mobile phone away, leaving on it a fingerprint that allows Nick, Hank and Wu to identify him. They put out an APB on his registered motorcycle, and a patrol car soon locates him at a motel. Meanwhile, the Wesen Council has decided to put a bounty on Nick and send it through to Wilde.

Juliette (Bitsie Tulloch) meets up with Henrietta (Garcelle Beauvais) hoping to learn how to reverse her transformation into a Hexenbiest. Henrietta teaches Juliette how to control her Woge. Henrietta takes a sample of Juliette's blood to determine what Juliette has become. The analysis of the sample takes a while to perform, so Juliette leaves.

Nick, Hank and Wu break into Wilde's hotel room. The evidence they have is only circumstantial, so they try to get Wilde to woge so that Nick can prove he is wesen. However, Wilde is aware of Nick's powers and restrains himself. Unable to get him to woge, they lock Wilde in a cell, giving the policeman on duty instructions not to go near him.

Viktor (Alexis Denisof) and Adalind (Claire Coffee) have arrived in Portland. Sean Reynard (Sasha Roiz) is warned of their arrival through the immigration system computer and visits them. Verbal sparring occurs.

Wilde feigns illness to attract the duty policeman and then woges, killing the policeman with his tail and dragging him close enough to grab the keys to his cell. Having escaped, Wilde heads off to trap Nick.

The results from Juliette's blood sample are in. The sample boils over and eats a hole through the table, the floor and the earth below. Henrietta is unsure whether the hole has an end. She concludes that Juliette is incredibly powerful and that she cannot be returned to normal. This upsets Juliette and she returns home. She is on the phone to Nick, to try to tell him about her condition, when Wilde breaks in. Wilde picks up the phone and tells Nick to come home, unaccompanied, or Wilde will kill Juliette.

Juliette resists Wilde and so he decides to kill her, anyway. Woging, he attempts to sting Juliette, but she is able to use her power to stop the sting and then forces it back into Wilde, killing him. Nick gets home to find the body on the floor and Juliette tells Nick that he attempted to kill her and "missed".

It seems that she has decided not to tell Nick about her condition after all.

Back in Europe, the members of the Wesen Council are dismayed to find that Wilde has been killed.

== Reception ==
=== Viewers ===
The episode was viewed by 4.67 million people, earning a 1.2/4 in the 18-49 rating demographics on the Nielson ratings scale, ranking third on its timeslot and seventh for the night in the 18-49 demographics, behind 20/20, Last Man Standing, Undercover Boss, Blue Bloods, Hawaii Five-0, and Shark Tank. This was a 4% decrease in viewership from the previous episode, which was watched by 4.85 million viewers with a 1.3/4. This means that 1.2 percent of all households with televisions watched the episode, while 4 percent of all households watching television at that time watched it. With DVR factoring in, the episode was watched by 7.71 million viewers and had a 2.3 ratings share in the 18-49 demographics.

=== Critical reviews ===
"Maréchaussée" received mixed reviews. Kathleen Wiedel from TV Fanatic, gave a 4.5 star rating out of 5, stating: "What happens when a Wesen Council hitman comes to town? Absolute awesomeness, that's what! On Grimm Season 4 Episode 12, Juliette single-handedly took down The Mummy, and it's hands-down her best scene in the entire series."

MaryAnn Sleasman from TV.com, wrote, "So, Wesen bounty hunters and Council-sanctioned hits are a thing now. I love it. There's also a tip hotline, which I find hilarious due to its juxtaposition of modern and traditional. The Wesen Council represents one of the highest and oldest institutions in Wesen culture—a regulatory bastion with a penchant for corruption and questionable decision-making. It represents the secrecy and mystery surrounding Wesen, and could easily be labeled as 'the old guard.'"

Christine Horton of Den of Geek wrote, "In turn, Nick is forced tell Juliette that Adalind is back in town. Juliette reacts to the news by threatening to 'rip her throat out' – a threat we know now she can deliver on. By all accounts, we won’t have long to see her attempt it. Bitsie Tulloch, who plays Juliette, has tweeted: 'Next week is the showdown you've been waiting for for FOUR YEARS. W(b)itch fight.'"
