= Mishipeshu (Grimm) =

- Grimm episode
- Episode no.: Season 4 Episode 18
- Directed by: Omar Madha
- Written by: Alan DiFiore
- Editing by: Scott Boyd
- Production code: 418
- Original air date: April 17, 2015
- Running time: 42 minutes

Guest appearances
- Toni Trucks as Janelle Farris; Gregory Cruz as Hector Ballou; Booboo Stewart as Simon George

Episode chronology
← Previous "Hibernaculum"	Next → "Iron Hans"
- Grimm season 4

"Mishipeshu" is the 18th episode of season 4 of the supernatural drama television series Grimm and the 84th episode overall, which premiered on April 10, 2015, on the cable network NBC. The episode was written by Alan DiFiore and was directed by Omar Madha.

== Plot ==
Two days in the future, Nick (David Giuntoli) and Hank (Russell Hornsby) are fighting. Hank pins Nick against a wall and starts choking him. Suddenly, a spirit emerges from inside Hank.

In the present day, Nick and Hank arrive at Monroe and Rosalee's home for dinner. After Nick leaves, Rosalee says they need to talk to Captain Renard because he has the book Adalind used and there could be something in it to help Juliette. Monroe says they'll have to get the hat too.

At Carver High School, the janitor, Larry Killburn, is polishing the floors when he hears the front door open. He goes to investigate, but he doesn't see anyone. When he turns around, he is attacked from behind and killed.

The next morning, Wu meets Nick and Hank at the school. Wu tells them about what happened and tells them that Deputy Janelle Farris was the first to respond. Inside the school, they meet with Deputy Farris and examine Killburn's body. Deputy Farris says she'd guess an animal attacked Killburn, except for the fact that they're inside the school. Nick asks what they know about Killburn, and Deputy Farris indicates she hasn't done a background check yet, but Principal Wiley said that Killburn worked at the school for the last seven years and did his job but wasn't very sociable.

In the middle of a forest, Simon wakes up with blood around his mouth. He drinks some water and licks his hand. He goes to get more water but sees Mishipeshu's reflection instead of his, scaring him.

At an auto repair shop, Declan Henry Burke is under a car, working on it when he hears the door squeak. He asks if someone is there but gets no answer. He says he's almost done and will be out in a minute, but he is suddenly pulled out from under the car and screams.

Hank and Deputy Farris speak with Hector Ballou, and they tell Hector why they're looking for Simon. Hector tells them that Simon is on his third day of a power quest and could be back at any time, or he might not be back for another couple of days. Hector says Simon has been fasting and without sleep since he left, meaning he is probably pretty out of it. Hector tells them that Simon is hopefully connecting with his guardian spirit and that Simon could be anywhere on the mountain that he was left on, but that doesn't mean they can't look for him. Hanks steps aside as he gets a call from Nick, who tells Hank they have another victim. At the scene, Wu says he did a background check on Declan Henry Burke, and Hank tells him they need to see if he has a connection to Killburn, so Wu uses Declan's computer to see. Wu soon tells them that Killburn is in Declan's contacts, and Deputy Farris says they have similar records. Hank says to run the names of Killburn and Declan's contacts to see if they get a match.

Nick, Hank, and Deputy Farris are going through the names of Killburn and Declan's contacts. After multiple names, Deputy Farris and Hank find a match on the lists they are going through: Max McClay. Wu runs his name through the system and finds that Killburn was once arrested with Declan, and Declan was once arrested with McClay.

McClay returns home with firewood, and after he sets it down, he hears a noise. He grabs his gun and looks around as a possessed Simon watches from a closest. Simon slowly opens the closet as Nick, Hank, and Deputy Farris arrive to McClay's house. McClay hears their car doors close and goes to investigate but is attacked by Simon, causing his gun to go off. Hank goes in the front door of the house, while Nick covers the back and Deputy Farris stays with McClay. Mishipeshu takes takes over Simon's appearance and comes across Nick, who tells him he's a Grimm and that he knows he is Wesen. He tells him to get on the ground with his hands behind his head as Hank arrives. Nick tells Hank he thinks he's Wesen, although he didn't react when he looked at him. Mishipeshu then makes a giant leap onto the roof and starts running. Mishipeshu jumps off the roof by Deputy Farris, causing Simon's ankle to twist. Deputy Farris starts going after Mishipeshu, but it runs into the forest.

Nick, Hank, and Deputy Farris go talk with Hector again, and after describing what they saw, he gets out a book of local Native American "vision quest" involved mishipeshu (underwater Panther).. Hector says that "a Mishipeshu is a being that supposedly lives in the depths of the Gitchigumi or Lake Superior." He also tells them that the stories are related to the Anishinaabe tribes.

Nick, Hank, Deputy Farris, and Hector sit in a tent, and Hector makes a liquid for Nick, Hank, and Deputy Farris to drink to enter the dream world. Hank is hesitant at first, but he takes a sip and passes it to Deputy Farris. After she takes a sip, she gives it to Nick, but Hector stops him and says he didn't see it before, but he realizes Nick is different, and this could be dangerous for him. Hector then gives a necklace of Simon's for Hank to hold and a necklace that belonged to Simon's mother for Deputy Farris to hold. Hector continues singing until Hank starts to softly groan. Hector asks him where he is, and Hank says he's "in my dad's truck." Hector then asks how old he is, and Hank says he is five and a half. He starts to freak out as he sees Simon's point of view of his dad being beaten by three men, and Nick realizes that is the connection between Declan, Killburn, and McClay.

Simon stumbles through the forest but has trouble walking because of his injured ankle. He looks up at a Mishipeshu totem, and the eyes of the totem glow yellow. Hank continues running through the forest as he keeps seeing the attack on Simon's father. He comes across the Mishipeshu totem, as well as another one next to it. He reaches his hand up towards it as Simon comes out of the bushes. Mishipeshu leaves Simon and possesses Hank, who then runs away as Simon falls to the ground. Nick, Deputy Farris, and Hector find Simon, and Deputy Farris points out the Mishipeshu totem. Hector says if Hank got there first, then Mishipeshu must be using him since Simon is hurt. He says sometimes Mishipeshu can be a protective creature, while at other times it can be a vengeful beast that won't stop until all of its targets are dead. Mishipeshu walks into McClay's house and goes to attack, but it sees Simon instead of McClay. Hector comes out and tells it that it is no longer needed there. Nick then tries to get through to Hank, but Hank attacks him and pins him to a wall, choking Nick. Hector blows a red powder into Hank's face, which causes Mishipeshu to leave Hank and disappear through a wall. Hank grabs McClay out of the car and pins him against it. He tells him he knows he helped kill Simon's dad because he saw it happen, and McClay responds with a smirk, "Good luck proving it." Deputy Farris ask Simon if McClay was one of the men who killed his father, and Simon tells her yes.

McClay is sleeping with a gun in his hand as he suddenly gets attacked and killed by Mishipeshu. Mishipeshu goes into the forest to get a drink and then goes back inside the latest person it possessed: Deputy Farris.

== Reception ==
=== Viewers ===
The episode was viewed by 4.54 million people, earning a 1.0/4 in the 18-49 rating demographics on the Nielson ratings scale, ranking third on its timeslot and sixth for the night in the 18-49 demographics, behind Dateline NBC, The Amazing Race, Last Man Standing, 20/20, and Shark Tank. This was a 5% decrease in viewership from the previous episode, which was watched by 4.76 million viewers with a 1.1/4. This means that 1.0 percent of all households with televisions watched the episode, while 4 percent of all households watching television at that time watched it. With DVR factoring in, the episode was watched by 6.81 million viewers and had a 1.8 ratings share in the 18-49 demographics.

=== Critical reviews ===
"Mishipeshu" received positive reviews. Les Chappell from The A.V. Club gave the episode a "B−" rating and wrote, "'Mishipeshu' is one of those occasional episodes of Grimm that decides to produce a story far outside their typical mythology scope. While the show is steeped in magic and the supernatural, most of what happens obeys a certain set of rules, few of which can't be explained by a visit to the all-knowing Airstream or the ever helpful spice shop. Every so often though, the writers will introduce something that states there are more things in heaven and earth than are dreamt of in your philosophy, beings whose nature defies categorization even to the Grimms. Season two's 'La Llorona' and 'Volcanalis' are prime examples, where the creature encountered is not what you'd identify as typical Wesen and whose origins remain in the realm of myth even after the story's resolution."

Kathleen Wiedel from TV Fanatic, gave a 3.5 star rating out of 5, stating: "Native American lore abounds with rich material for a show like Grimm to work with, so I'm a bit surprised it took them this long to visit something like this, with a spirit being possessing a young man to take vengeance on the men who killed his father. The titular Mishipeshu of Grimm Season 4 Episode 18 isn't a Wesen; it falls under the same unexplained, "other" category as Volcanalis and La Llorona."

MaryAnn Sleasman from TV.com, wrote, "'Mishipeshu' was one of those episodes that further fleshed out Nick's world and reminded us that not all weirdness is the work of a Wesen or two. A Native American boy named Simon came of age and found himself stuck in the position of hosting the mythical Mishipeshu, which probably wouldn't have been so bad if it didn't result in him waking up in the woods, covered in someone else's blood. That it was the blood of his father's unpunished murderers added an element of justification to the whole thing, but still — not a great situation to be in."

Christine Horton of Den of Geek wrote, "Grimm's writers prefer to drip-feed us clues about character development or plot over several episodes, or even seasons, presumably favouring a slow build of anticipation over real momentum. We have come to accept this, despite some storylines feeling laboriously drawn-out, and others paid lip service seemingly only when the writers remember them. (anyone seen Nick ‘grey-out’ lately?) Perhaps one of the problems lies in the fact that it is a 22-episode season, which is an awfully long time to maintain momentum. (Den of Geek rightly points out that series that attract the most acclaim – True Detective for example – are far tighter, have fewer episodes, and are scheduled in one run.)"
