= Death Do Us Part (Grimm) =

- Grimm episode
- Episode no.: Season 4 Episode 11
- Directed by: Constantine Makris
- Written by: Jeff Miller
- Cinematography by: Fernando Argüelles
- Editing by: George Pilkinton
- Production code: 411
- Original air date: January 30, 2015
- Running time: 42 minutes

Guest appearances
- Garcelle Beauvais as Henrietta; Derek Phillips as Stetson Donovan; Rebecca Wisocky as Lily Hinkley; Shaun Brown as Paul

Episode chronology
← Previous "Tribunal"	Next → "Maréchaussée"
- Grimm season 4

"Death Do Us Part" is the 11th episode of season 4 of the supernatural drama television series Grimm and the 77th episode overall, which premiered on January 30, 2015, on the cable network NBC. The episode was written by Jeff Miller and was directed by Constantine Makris.

== Plot ==
Opening quote: "He felt now that he was not simply close to her, but that he did not know where he ended and she began."

Three bloggers enter a seemingly haunted house for their web series. The house was abandoned for five years after the previous couple living there was killed by an electric accident. While investigating, one of them, Raymond Miller (Ray Callaway) is killed by an electric creature. Meanwhile, Juliette (Bitsie Tulloch) reveals her form to Renard (Sasha Roiz), who deduces that it may be a side effect of the antidote. Juliette then tells him to call Elizabeth to find a solution.

Nick (David Giuntoli) and Hank (Russell Hornsby) investigate the case and decide to ask the detective who investigated the death of the owners. He states that they were nearly unrecognizable and they were electrocuted to 200,000 amperes. He also adds that the woman, Patty Donovan (Caren Calderon) was having an affair with her husband’s co-worker, Theo, who has been a prime suspect since she chose her husband, Stetson, over him. After Juliette causes an accident using her powers, Renard takes her to a cafe where he gives her a number in a note to a woman named Henrietta (Garcelle Beauvais) and after she memorizes the numbers, the numbers move over the paper.

Nick and Hank interrogate the suspect's wife, Lily (Rebecca Wisocky), who admits that her husband died 5 years ago. She woges into a Scharfblicke and Nick tells her to reveal more. She reveals that the person on an image of the video is in fact Stetson (Derek Phillips), Patty's husband, who killed Theo for the affair and is also an eel-like Wesen named Matança Zumbido. They find in the trailer that the only way to stop the Matança Zumbido is to pierce the opponent's ear and rub a special paste from a poison in the piercing.

That night, one of the bloggers, Paul (Shaun Brown), sneaks into the house and hides in the closet just as Stetson lures Lily (confusing her as Patty) into the room. Nick and Hank arrive at the house just as Paul is caught. Nick defeats Stetson but before he can arrest him, Lily shoots Stetson, causing him to send an electric wave over the house. Juliette arrives at Henrietta's house and she is greeted by her, saying they have to talk. Later that night, Renard notices blood dripping from his shirt and upon taking it off, he finds that they're dripping from his bullet wounds. He touches them and sees that there's no wound for the blood.

== Reception ==
=== Viewers ===
The episode was viewed by 4.85 million people, earning a 1.3/4 in the 18-49 rating demographics on the Nielson ratings scale, ranking third on its timeslot and seventh for the night in the 18-49 demographics, behind Last Man Standing, Undercover Boss, Blue Bloods, 20/20, Hawaii Five-0, and Shark Tank. This was a 4% decrease in viewership from the previous episode, which was watched by 5.02 million viewers with a 1.3/4. This means that 1.3 percent of all households with televisions watched the episode, while 4 percent of all households watching television at that time watched it. With DVR factoring in, the episode was watched by 7.71 million viewers and had a 2.3 ratings share in the 18-49 demographics.

=== Critical reviews ===
"Death Do Us Part" received mixed reviews. Kathleen Wiedel from TV Fanatic, gave a 2.8 star rating out of 5, stating: "I can't help but find myself disappointed in Grimm Season 4 Episode 11 - and especially after last week's epic entry 'Tribunal,' this one just seems... blah. Grimm tackled ghosts before, and far more effectively, with La Llorona back in Grimm Season 2 Episode 9. The Wesen of the week here was simply a delusional electrical creature who was mad about his wife sleeping with another man."

MaryAnn Sleasman from TV.com, wrote, "Sometimes you just have to sit back and wonder what the frack you just watched. 'Death Do Us Part' wasn't particularly bad, but it sure wasn't great coming on the heels of the genuinely excellent episodes that Grimm's been airing lately. It was your standard case-of-the-week fare. Admittedly, the new Wesen was cool and I'm always in favor of network TV pushing the gore limits. In the eyes of Standards & Practices, bare titties are traumatizing, but scorched, still-smoking corpses with melted eyes and cracked-open skulls are apparently totally fine."

Christine Horton of Den of Geek wrote, "So after the excitement of the last couple of episodes, it's difficult to get as animated about this week's Grimm, Death Do Us Part. Realistically, no one can expect 22-episodes of high octane action – otherwise Jason Statham would have his own TV series. So it's with some resignation that you realize this is a bridging episode at best."
