= William & Kate: The Movie =

- DVD Cover (Region 2)
- Written by: Nancey Silvers
- Directed by: Mark Rosman
- Starring: Nico Evers-Swindell; Camilla Luddington
- Country of origin: United States
- Original language: English

Production
- Producers: Eileen Fields; Lina Wong
- Cinematography: Anthony B. Richmond
- Editor: Charles Bornstein
- Running time: 87 minutes

Original release
- Network: Lifetime
- Release: April 18, 2011

William & Kate: The Movie is the first of two unrelated American television films about the relationship between Prince William and Catherine "Kate" Middleton (now the Prince and Princess of Wales), directed by Mark Rosman and written by Nancey Silvers. The film was a ratings success, despite the negative reception from critics. The second film William & Catherine: A Royal Romance was produced by the Hallmark Channel and released in August 2011.

Produced by Lifetime, the filming of William & Kate took place mostly in Los Angeles, with some second unit location filming in the United Kingdom, and the release date was April 18, 2011, eleven days before the wedding of William and Catherine on April 29, 2011.

Kate Middleton is played by Camilla Luddington, an English-born actress, while William is played by Nico Evers-Swindell, a New Zealander.

== Cast ==
- Nico Evers-Swindell – Prince William
- Camilla Luddington – Catherine Middleton
- Samantha Whittaker – Olivia Martin
- Jonathan Patrick Moore – Ian Musgrave
- Richard Reid - Derek Rodgers
- Ben Cross – The Prince of Wales
- Calvin Goldspink – James Middleton
- Serena Scott Thomas – Carole Middleton
- Christopher Cousins – Michael Middleton
- Justin Hanlon – Prince Harry
- Trilby Glover – Margaret Hemmings-Wellington
- Mary Elise Hayden – Pippa Middleton
- Charles Shaughnessy – Flight Instructor
- Louise Linton – Vanessa Rose Bellows
- Stephen Marsh – Professor Durham
- Theo Cross – Trevor
- Victoria Tennant – Celia

== Reception ==
The film received negative reviews, with The Guardian calling it "awful, toe-curlingly, teeth-furringly, pillow-bitingly ghastly", the Daily Mirror saying it "contains moments so royally ridiculous they could only have occurred in the mind of a third-rate script writer" and the London Evening Standard saying its only positive was that "it is recognisably a film, in that it takes place on a screen. Events run in a forward direction." The film has also been criticised for its use of American actors, for some of its images, and for first unit filming taking place in the United States.
