= Bad Luck (Grimm) =

- Grimm episode
- Episode no.: Season 4 Episode 14
- Directed by: Terrence O'Hara
- Written by: Thomas Ian Griffith
- Cinematography by: Eliot Rockett
- Editing by: George Pilkinton
- Production code: 414
- Original air date: March 20, 2015
- Running time: 42 minutes

Guest appearances
- Garcelle Beauvais as Henrietta; Romy Rosemont as Beverly Bennett; Richard Brake as Nigel Edmund; Jenessa Grant as Chloe Bennett

Episode chronology
← Previous "Trial by Fire"	Next → "Double Date"
- Grimm season 4

"Bad Luck" is the 14th episode of season 4 of the supernatural drama television series Grimm and the 80th episode overall, which premiered on March 20, 2015, on the cable network NBC. The episode was written by Thomas Ian Griffith and was directed by Terrence O'Hara.

== Plot ==
After Nick (David Giuntoli) finds out that Juliette (Bitsie Tulloch) has become a Hexenbiest, he visits Henrietta (Garcelle Beauvais), who says there is no cure and that Nick must either kill Juliette or accept her new status. He cannot cope with the change though, leading Juliette to leave.

Meanwhile, Nick, Hank (Russell Hornsby), and Wu (Reggie Lee) investigate the murder of a teenager named Peter whose foot was cut off by a wesen named Leporem Venator (a Black Fox-like Wesen). They discover the victim was a Willahara (rabbit like wesen), whose foot was cut off as he woged so it could be used by a couple to improve their fertility. Monroe (Silas Weir Mitchell) and Rosalee (Bree Turner) go undercover to a Wesen fertility clinic to find the killer.

Adalind (Claire Coffee) meets Renard (Sasha Roiz), who says he knows of Juliette's change and that he sent her to Henrietta to learn more. Adalind pays Henrietta a visit to understand the extent of Juliette's powers, but instead learns that she is pregnant with Nick's child.

== Reception ==
=== Viewers ===
The episode was viewed by 4.78 million people, earning a 1.1/4 in the 18-49 rating demographics on the Nielson ratings scale, ranking second on its timeslot and sixth for the night in the 18-49 demographics, behind 20/20, Dateline NBC, Last Man Standing, an NCAA game and Shark Tank. This was a 2% decrease in viewership from the previous episode, which was watched by 4.86 million viewers with a 1.1/4. This means that 1.1 percent of all households with televisions watched the episode, while 4 percent of all households watching television at that time watched it. With DVR factoring in, the episode was watched by 7.38 million viewers and had a 2.1 ratings share in the 18-49 demographics.

=== Critical reviews ===
"Bad Luck" received positive reviews. Les Chappell from The A.V. Club gave the episode a "B+" rating and wrote, "'Bad Luck,' the show's return after a month-long hiatus, is an episode that is representative of the groove that Grimm has found itself in. The episode is largely a monster-of-the-week affair, in this case establishing the barbaric tradition that the left feet of a rabbit-like Wesen called Villeharra are considered potent symbols of luck and fertility. A hunter is doing good business marketing to desperate couples looking to conceive, farming a Villeharra family whenever he gets a new client. For an episode that's got an innately silly idea behind it, there's some genuinely good horror beats it gets — particularly early on, when the combination of axe-wielding murderer and teenager in letter jacket recreates the slasher movie beats and does so without being campy."

Kathleen Wiedel from TV Fanatic, gave a 2.3 star rating out of 5, stating: "Just when things were going so well, the writer pulled an episode like this out of their hats. Many fans, myself included, have been very excited by the Juliette storyline, with her finally gaining fantastic new abilities that would allow her to not be a victim in every other episode. On Grimm Season 4 Episode 14, however, it was like they took all those wonderful possibilities and threw them out the window."

MaryAnn Sleasman from TV.com, wrote, "Grimm has never really taken the stance that being a Wesen is totally awesome, but just in case there was ever any doubt, 'Bad Luck' made it clear that Wesen life isn't exactly easy. If it's not the Wesen Council scaring your average Wesen straight, then it's other Wesen hunting their peers or upholding ancient blood feuds, and then, of course, there are the Royals. Not all Wesen are so obviously powerful as a Blutbad or as terrifying as a Hexenbiest; some Wesen are more easily preyed upon, and it's these Wesen, our Baurschwein and our bunny rabbits, that Grimm turns to when it wants to illustrate the injustices of Wesen society."

Christine Horton of Den of Geek wrote, "Grimm returned from yet another mid-season sabbatical to deal with the fallout of Nick's discovery that his girlfriend is a right witch."
