= Please Stand By =

- Theatrical release poster; the hand gesture is a Vulcan salute
- Directed by: Ben Lewin
- Screenplay by: Michael Golamco
- Based on: Please Stand By by Michael Golamco
- Produced by: Lara Alameddine; Daniel Dubiecki
- Starring: Dakota Fanning; Toni Collette; Alice Eve; River Alexander; Patton Oswalt
- Cinematography: Geoffrey Simpson
- Edited by: Lisa Bromwell
- Music by: Heitor Pereira
- Production companies: Allegiance Theater; 2929 Productions
- Distributed by: Magnolia Pictures
- Release dates: October 27, 2017 (Austin); January 26, 2018 (United States)
- Running time: 93 minutes
- Country: United States
- Language: English
- Box office: $406,732

Please Stand By is a 2017 American comedy-drama film directed by Ben Lewin and based on the 2008 short play of the same name by Michael Golamco, who also wrote the screenplay. The film stars Dakota Fanning, Toni Collette, Alice Eve, River Alexander and Patton Oswalt, and was distributed by Magnolia Pictures. After playing at various film festivals, the film was simultaneously released theatrically and on-demand on January 26, 2018.

== Plot ==
Wendy is an autistic young woman with a special interest in Star Trek. She lives a routine life in a San Francisco group home where she is monitored by the house manager, Scottie. She spends her time writing a 427-page Star Trek script to enter in Paramount Pictures' screenwriting contest for the $100,000 prize.

Wendy is visited by her sister Audrey, who shows her pictures of her infant daughter, Ruby, and reveals that she is selling their childhood home. Wendy asks her to take her home, arguing that she will be able to buy back the house and help care for Ruby once she wins the screenwriting contest. Audrey refuses, informing Wendy she is not capable of caring for a baby. Wendy has a meltdown and Audrey leaves the group home weeping.

After Wendy misses the mail-in date to send her script to Paramount Pictures, she decides to deliver the script herself. She leaves the group home early the next morning and is followed by the group home's small dog, Pete. They board a bus to Los Angeles, but are left by the side of the road as Pete urinates on the bus.

Wendy then wanders into a shanty town, where she is robbed of most of her money. She then wanders to a nearby shop and is nearly swindled out of the last of her money by an employee. Luckily, elderly woman Rose intervenes to stop them from exploiting Wendy. She sympathizes with her as her grandson is also autistic, and lets Wendy accompany her on the senior citizens' bus. However, the driver falls asleep at the wheel, crashing the bus.

Following the bus crash, Wendy wakes up in a hospital in Bakersfield. Still determined to deliver her script as planned, she leaves Pete at the hospital and escapes. During her escape, Wendy loses part of her script by chance. She gathers used paper and begins rewriting it.

Simultaneously, Audrey and Scottie have realized Wendy is missing. They begin to search for her and file a missing persons report. After correctly deducing that Wendy left for LA to personally deliver her script, Scottie and her son Sam leave on the road. The Bakersfield hospital notifies Scottie and Audrey of Wendy's whereabouts; police continue the search from there. Scottie and Sam find the missing script pages while scouring the hospital.

Wendy then attempts to buy a bus ticket to LA, but is unable to as she has only coins remaining. She ultimately stows away on the next bus there, inside the baggage compartment. Upon her arrival to LA, Wendy wanders around until two police officers recognize her from the missing persons report. Fortunately, Officer Frank gains Wendy's trust by speaking to her in Klingon. They bring her to the police station, where she is reunited with Audrey and Scottie. They drive Wendy to Paramount Pictures so she can deliver her script as planned.

Despite being stonewalled by a bad-mannered mailroom worker, Wendy is able to sneak past security and submit the script to the turn-in box. Satisfied that she has completed her mission, Wendy informs her sister she did this to prove that she was more capable than Audrey thought.

Wendy returns to the group home where she later receives a letter from Paramount Pictures informing her that her script was not chosen, but encouraging her to continue writing. Despite the rejection, she is satisfied with everything she has accomplished. Wendy visits Audrey at their childhood home and holds her niece in her arms for the first time, while her sister embraces her.

== Cast ==
- Dakota Fanning as Wendy, an autistic young woman
- Toni Collette as Scottie, a group home manager
- Alice Eve as Audrey, Wendy's older sister
- River Alexander as Sam, Scottie's son
- Patton Oswalt as Officer Frank
- Marla Gibbs as Rose
- Michael Stahl-David as Jack
- Jessica Rothe as Julie
- Tony Revolori as Nemo
- Jacob Wysocki as Male Nurse
- Stephanie Allynne as Female Nurse
- Robin Weigert as Officer Doyle
- Denise Dowse as Bus Driver Doris
- Laura Innes as Ticket Agent #1
- Blaster as Pete The Chihuahua

== Release ==
It had its world premiere at the Austin Film Festival on October 27, 2017. It was theatrically released on January 26, 2018 and on VOD by Magnolia Home Entertainment on May 1, 2018.

== Reception ==
=== Box office ===
Please Stand By grossed $9,868 in the United States and Canada, and $396,864 in other territories, for a worldwide total of $406,732. Sales of its DVD/Blu-ray releases have grossed an estimated $145,291.

=== Critical response ===
On review aggregator Rotten Tomatoes, the film holds an approval rating of 58% based on 38 reviews, and an average rating of 5.86/10. The website's critical consensus reads, "Please Stand By hits a number of familiar coming-of-age beats, but adds just enough of a Trek-fueled twist to keep things interesting." On Metacritic, the film has a weighted average score of 49 out of 100, based on 12 critics, indicating "mixed or average reviews". It was described as "quietly subversive" in a positive review by the Thinking Person's Guide to Autism.
