= Double Date (Grimm) =

- Grimm episode
- Episode no.: Season 4 Episode 15
- Directed by: Karen Gaviola
- Written by: Brenna Kouf
- Cinematography by: Fernando Arguelles
- Editing by: Scott Boyd
- Production code: 415
- Original air date: March 27, 2015
- Running time: 42 minutes

Guest appearances
- Mark Famiglietti as Linus Balouzian; Briana Lane as Stacy Balouzian; Alexis Denisof as Prince Viktor Chlodwig zu Schellendorf von Konigsburg

Episode chronology
← Previous "Bad Luck"	Next → "Heartbreaker"
- Grimm season 4

"Double Date" is the 15th episode of season 4 of the supernatural drama television series Grimm and the 81st episode overall, which premiered on March 27, 2015, on the cable network NBC. The episode was written by Brenna Kouf and was directed by Karen Gaviola.

== Plot ==
Nick (David Giuntoli) and Hank (Russell Hornsby) investigate a crime scene in the middle of a bizarre love triangle involved a flatworm like wesen called huntha lami muuaji. Captain Renard (Sasha Roiz) seeks Monroe (Silas Weir Mitchell) and Rosalee's (Bree Turner) help to stop phantom bleeding when he was shot by Weston Steward. Adalind (Claire Coffee) asks for a favor that could change the course of Juliette's (Bitsie Tulloch) relationship with Nick. Juliette faces a tough decision about her future with Nick.

== Reception ==
=== Viewers ===
The episode was viewed by 4.93 million people, earning a 1.0/4 in the 18-49 rating demographics on the Nielson ratings scale, ranking second on its timeslot and sixth for the night in the 18-49 demographics, behind Dateline NBC, 20/20, Shark Tank, Dateline NBC, and an NCAA game. This was a 3% increase in viewership from the previous episode, which was watched by 4.78 million viewers with a 1.1/4. This means that 1.0 percent of all households with televisions watched the episode, while 4 percent of all households watching television at that time watched it. With DVR factoring in, the episode was watched by 7.33 million viewers and had a 1.9 ratings share in the 18-49 demographics.

=== Critical reviews ===
"Double Date" received positive reviews. Les Chappell from The A.V. Club gave the episode a "B" rating and wrote, "Unfortunately, while 'Double Date' has some interesting ideas in the nature of the Hunta Lami Muuaji it takes a disappointing solution to the problem. While in other circumstances Nick might try to find some middle ground, here his approach is blunt force by way of a crossbow, loading Linus/Stacy up with enough testosterone to keep the latter repressed so the former can be convicted of the crime. It's a problematic point (or an 'ethically ambiguous, morally grey area-type situation' as Monroe puts it) but the ethics of the argument are almost entirely glossed over. Despite the excellent framing of the church stand-off and the clear sense of loss on Linus's face when he's unable to reconnect, everything is tied off too neatly and without enough acknowledgement of how they're essentially killing Stacy off. True, the fact that they're both willing participants in the crime makes Nick's actions justified, but there's a whole level of ramifications here that Grimm doesn't have either the time or interest to explore."

Kathleen Wiedel from TV Fanatic, gave a 4 star rating out of 5, stating: "Well, that's the worst case of dissociative identity disorder I've ever seen. In Grimm Season 4 Episode 15, an unusual sort of Wesen actually had three forms: a male human, a female human, and its intermediate flatworm form."

MaryAnn Sleasman from TV.com, wrote, "While 'Double Date' disappointed in some big ways, just like with so many other Grimm episodes, the questions and considerations raised by its flaws managed to elevate the hour just a little bit higher than it would otherwise rank. Grimm is more of a thinking show than initially meets the eye—and that's part of what keeps us coming back every week."

Christine Horton of Den of Geek wrote, "This was Adalind's hilarious – yet accurate – response to the news to finding herself pregnant again, and was the unquestionably the line of the show."
