= Loners (2019 film) =

Loners is an American film released in May 2019, directed by Eryc Tramonn and written by Neil McGowan. It stars David Christian Welborn, Denise Dowse, Tyson Turrou and Brian Letscher. The film was produced by Charles Myers, Robert Shulevitz and Tyson Turrou.

The plot concerns a group of loners sent for compulsory group therapy, and has been described as a "biting satire set in the very near future".

It was selected for the 2019 Canadian International Comedy Film Festival.
