= Michael Golamco =

American dramatist

Michael Golamco is an American playwright and screenwriter for film and television. He is of Filipino and Chinese American descent.

== Plays ==
=== Achievers ===
Achievers (2001) was Golamco's first full-length play, and was read publicly in New York City by theater group Second Generation Productions. In 2001, a full production of the play was put on by a theater group called "Propergander" that included Randall Park, Vivian Bang, Tim Chiou, Eddie Shin and others. The play was then produced at other universities including Dartmouth College (the first university performance), Cal Poly Pomona, UC Berkeley and in 2005, Stanford University.

In 2006, Golamco wrote a feature film screenplay version of the play, which was turned into a film directed by Abraham Lim (who also helped co-write the screenplay), and which also starred Randall Park, Tim Chiou and others - the film received positive reviews from publications such as Variety, which called it a "a divertingly loopy experience by turns deadpan, surreal, and quietly poignant" with "cleverly interwoven plot strands, a lively mix of visuals, spot-on perfs and a cool soundtrack".

=== The Shadow on the Moon ===
Currently in development, The Shadow on the Moon is a self-described "hard-edged comedic and dramatic exploration of the link between religious awakening and mental illness." In August 2005, the play was publicly read in New York City with the theater company Second Generation Productions.

=== Cowboy vs. Samurai ===
Golamco's play Cowboy versus Samurai (2005) has run with the National Asian American Theater Company in New York, receiving favorable reviews from The New York Times. The play was also produced in Seattle as well as in Canada at the Vancouver Asian Canada Theater company and in Hong Kong by Looking Glass Productions. The Los Angeles premiere of the play will be produced and staged by Artists at Play in the Fall of 2013. The Los Angeles premiere from Artists at Play was directed by Peter Kuo, and starred Feodor Chin as Chester, West Liang as Travis Park, Julia Cho as Veronica Lee and Daniel Vincent Gordh as Del (the last two cast members also being from the Emmy Award-winning webseries The Lizzie Bennet Diaries). The play has also been produced in Minneapolis (by Mu Performing Arts), Seattle (by SiS Productions), San Francisco (by the Asian American Theater Company), San Diego, California (by Mo’olelo), and Dallas, Texas. Cowboy Versus Samurai was also selected by the Tribeca Film Institute for its All Access Open Stage Program, and is available in print in Smith and Kraus's New Playwrights: The Best Plays of 2006 and The Best Stage Scenes of 2006.

=== Year Zero ===
Golamco's play about Cambodian Americans growing up in Long Beach, Year Zero (2009), ran at the Second Stage Theater in New York City, Victory Gardens Theater in Chicago, and at the Colony Theater in Burbank, Los Angeles. Year Zero also was a Grand Prize winner of the Chicago Dramatists' Many Voices Project, and was nominated for a Jeff Award in the "Best New Work" category. In New York, the originating cast starred Mason Lee (son of director Ang Lee) as Vuthy, and David Huynh played Vuthy and Tim Chiou played Han when the production went to LA's Colony Theater (with Chiou also playing the role of Han in the Chicago production at the Victory Gardens Theater).

=== Build ===
Golamco's most recent play, Build (2012) premiered at the Geffen Playhouse in Los Angeles during October to November 2012. The play concerns the story of two Silicon Valley legends struggling with coding their latest video game and dealing with a female artificial intelligence, or A.I. According to an article in LA Weekly, Golamco also immersed himself in the game World of Warcraft in order to write the play.

=== Short plays ===
Golamco's short plays include Heartbreaker (2007), a predecessor to his full-length play Year Zero (2009). It featured the same Cambodian American teenage character of Vuthy (pronounced "Woo-tee") and was performed for Second Generation’s TEN Reading Series at New York’s Joseph Papp Public Theater in April–May 2007, has also been published in the anthology "Best Ten Minute Plays Of 2007: 2 Actors" (Smith & Kraus 2007), and was also selected as a finalist for the Actors Theatre of Louisville’s 2009 National Ten Minute Play Competition/Heideman Award.

Another short play is Please Stand By (2008), in which a girl named Wendy who has autism spectrum disorder and a fixation on Star Trek. She has written a three hundred page script for a new Star Trek television series and needs to reach Los Angeles so that Joss Whedon can read it. In 2008, the play was performed for Thumping Claw alongside one acts written by Carla Ching, Julia Cho and Lloyd Suh, starred Vivian Bang, Monica Hong and Bernadette Bonfliglio, and was directed by Heidi Helen Davis. This was the basis for Golamco's feature film screenplay of the same name, made into the film Please Stand By (2017), directed by Ben Lewin (The Sessions) and starring Dakota Fanning and Toni Collette.

=== Accolades and awards ===
Golamco also received the Helen Merill Award, was a member of the Center Theatre Group's writing workshop, and is currently working on new play commissions from the South Coast Repertory and the Second Stage Theater. Golamco is also a member of the playwright collective New Dramatists.

== Film, screenplays and teleplays ==
Golamco has also written the screenplay for the award-winning short film, Dragon of Love starring Randall Park and directed by Doan La. He has also co-written a feature film entitled The Achievers (based on a stage play he wrote entitled "Achievers") with Abraham Lim, and also directed by Abraham Lim, starring Tim Chiou, Randall Park, Samantha Quan and Alexis Rhee. In 2014-2015, Golamco wrote a feature film screenplay entitled Please Stand By, which was released in 2017, directed by Ben Lewin (The Sessions), and also starring Toni Collette, Dakota Fanning and Alice Eve.

In 2019, Golamco co-wrote the screenplay along with Randall Park and Ali Wong for the film Always Be My Maybe, directed by Nahnatchka Khan.

In May 2019, Golamco was confirmed to co-write the Akira live action adaptation with Taika Waititi (who was set to direct before exiting to direct Thor: Love and Thunder).

=== Grimm ===
Golamco was a staff writer for the NBC television series Grimm. For the series, he has written the teleplays for the episodes "You Don't Know Jack" (Season 4, episode 20) (2015), "Hibernaculum" (Season 4, episode 17) (2015), "Cry Luison" (Season 4, episode 5) (2014), "El Cucuy" (Season 3, episode 5) (2013) and "Synchronicity" (Season 3, episode 17) (2014), the story for the episode "The Law of Sacrifice" (Season 3, episode 18) (2014), and was a story editor for the episode "Thanks for the Memories" (Season 4, episode 1) (2014) of NBC's series Grimm. For season 4 of the series, Golamco was promoted to story editor along with another staff writer Thomas Ian Griffith. Golamco became executive story editor for season 5, at which time Griffith became co-producer on the show.

== Education and background ==
Golamco is a graduate of University of California, Los Angeles (UCLA), where he majored in English literature. He also graduated from Redwood High School in Larkspur, California.

== Bibliography ==
=== Plays ===
- Build (2012)
- Year Zero (2009)
- Cowboy versus Samurai (2005)
- The Shadow of the Moon (2005)
- Achievers (2001)

=== Short plays ===
- Please Stand By (2008)
- Heartbreaker (2007)

=== Screenplays ===
- Akira (TBA) (with Taika Waititi)
- Always Be My Maybe (2019)
- Please Stand By (2017)
- The Achievers (2006)
- Dragon of Love (short) (2003)

=== Teleplays ===
- "You Don't Know Jack", Grimm (Season 4, episode 20) (2015) (written by)
- "Hibernaculum", Grimm (Season 4, episode 17) (2015) (written by)
- "Cry Luison", Grimm (Season 4, episode 5) (2014) (written by)
- "Synchronicity", Grimm (Season 3, episode 17) (2014) (story and teleplay)
- "El Cucuy", Grimm (Season 3, episode 5) (2013) (written by)
- "The Law of Sacrifice", Grimm (Season 3, episode 18) (2014) (story)
- "Rebirth", Nightflyers (Season 1, episode 8) (2018) (teleplay)
