= Danny Bruno =

American actor

Danny Bruno (born August 13, 1952) is an American theater, television and film actor. He is perhaps best known for portraying Bud Wurstner on the NBC fantasy drama Grimm.

== Theatre ==
After relocating to the Pacific Northwest in 1976, Bruno was an English teacher from 1976 to 1978. In 1979, he began his career in acting. Since then, he has had major roles in hundreds of plays throughout the Northwest including at the Oregon Shakespeare Festival, Portland Center Stage, New Rose Theater, Artists Repertory Theatre, Oregon Repertory Theatre, Hult Center for the Performing Arts, and Stark Raving Theatre among others.

On June 13, 2005, the Drammy Committee presented Bruno with a Drammy award for Outstanding Supporting Actor for his portrayal of Dave Moss in David Mamet's Glengarry Glen Ross.

== Television ==
Bruno's television roles include Bud Wurstner in Grimm (TV series) (2011–2017),Portlandia (TV series) (2014), Agent Bob in Leverage (TV series) (2010–2011), Officer Dixon in In the Line of Duty: Blaze of Glory (TV Series) (1997), Nowhere Man (TV series) (1995) and Without Warning: Terror in the Towers (1993). On October 13, 2014, Oregon Media Production Association presented Bruno with the Best Male Actor Award 2014 for his work in Grimm and Portlandia.

== Film ==
On the big screen, he has appeared in such films as What the #$*! Do We (K)now!?, Without Evidence, and other small films.
