= Nico Evers-Swindell =

New Zealand actor

Nico Thomas Evers-Swindell is a New Zealand actor who portrayed Prince William in the 2011 Lifetime original film William & Kate. Previous roles include minor appearances in the 2010 film Edge of Darkness and the television crime drama Law & Order. He is a cousin of twice gold-winning Olympic rowing champions Caroline and Georgina Evers-Swindell.

He studied at Victoria University of Wellington, from where he graduated with a Bachelor of Commerce and Administration and Bachelor of Laws in 2003.

In 2011, Evers-Swindell married American actress Megan Ferguson. He played Prince Kenneth on the series Grimm.

== Filmography ==
=== Film ===
Year	Title	Role	Notes
2010	Edge of Darkness	State Trooper #2	
2013	Parkland	Rufus Youngblood	
2018	White Rabbit	Ethan	
2018	Maude	Eric	Short film

=== Television ===
Year	Title	Role	Notes
2008	Law & Order	Eric	Episode: "Executioner"
2008	The Secret Game	#6 Duke Medical	Television film
2008	Guiding Light	Messenger	Season 57, episode 52
2010	NCIS: Los Angeles	Blond Russian #1	Episode: "Deliverance"
2011	William & Kate: The Movie	Prince William	Television film
2013	The Office	Cpl. Miller	Episode: "A.A.R.M."
2013	Drop Dead Diva	Zack Trent/David Clemens	Episode: "Jane's Secret Revealed"
2013	CSI: Crime Scene Investigation	Deputy Willis	Episode: "Girls Gone Wild"
2014	Manhattan Love Story	Tucker	6 episodes
2015	Grimm	Prince Kenneth	6 episodes
2015	American Horror Story: Hotel	Craig	Episode: "Devil's Night"
2017–2020	The Magicians	Nigel/Umber	3 episodes
2018	The Assassination of Gianni Versace: American Crime Story	Phil Cote	2 episodes
2019	Arrested Development	Officer Howell	Episode: "Check Mates"
2019–2020	On My Block	Bryan	2 episodes
2019	In the Dark	Bradley	Episode: "Pilot"
2020	Robbie	Nate Daniels	Episode: "Robbie vs. Janie's Husband"
2021	Bonding	Martin	2 episodes

=== Music videos ===
Year	Title	Artist	Role	Ref.
2015	"Sugar"	Maroon 5	Groom	
