= Philip Anthony-Rodriguez =

American actor

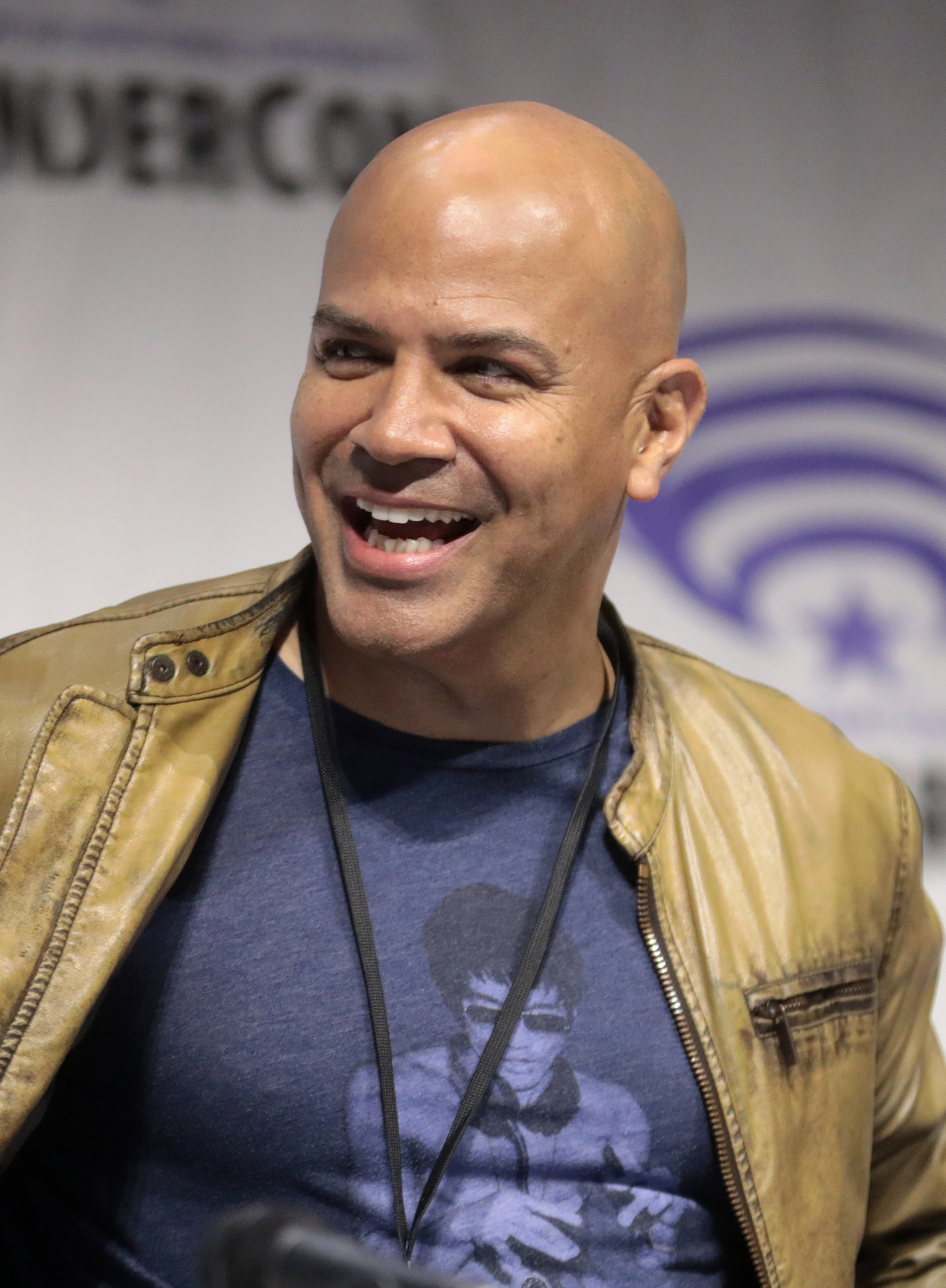
- Anthony-Rodriguez at the 2019 WonderCon
- Born: Brooklyn, New York, U.S.
- Other names: Philip Anthony Rodriguez; Philip Anthony Rodrigues
- Occupation: Actor
- Years active: 1990–present

Philip Anthony-Rodriguez is an American actor known for his roles on Jake 2.0 as Kyle Duarte, the voice of disc jockey Maurice Chavez in the 2002 video game Grand Theft Auto: Vice City and its 2006 prequel Grand Theft Auto: Vice City Stories, and as Jetstream Sam in the 2013 video game Metal Gear Rising: Revengeance.

== Early life ==
Philip Anthony-Rodriguez was born in Brooklyn, New York City to Puerto Rican parents Maximo and Veronica (née Burgos). The youngest of five children, he began acting, singing, and doing voices when he was young. At age 11, he started working with Acting by Children, a young people's performing group in New York City founded by Jeanne Niederlitz. As a result of his talent and look, the management group Niederlitz and Steele signed him and began representing him in talent auditions. Anthony-Rodriguez began working almost immediately and has been a busy working actor for over four decades. Being raised in a bilingual household has enabled Anthony-Rodriguez to work in the business in both English and Spanish.

== Career ==
In November 1990, Anthony-Rodriguez originated the role of Ritchie Valens in the musical Buddy: The Buddy Holly Story. He provided the voice of the male version of protagonist SPARTAN-B312 in the 2010 video game Halo: Reach. He is the voice of Jetstream Sam in Metal Gear Rising: Revengeance. He also played Dr. Evans in Madea's Big Happy Family. He recurred for six seasons as Ruben Enriquez in the ABC Family television series The Secret Life of the American Teenager. He played Nelson in film The Ode and had a guest role on the Disney Channel show Hannah Montana in 2009 and played Michael Grant in Castle in 2010. In 2011, he guest-starred on the Disney Channel show Shake It Up (season 1, episode 18: "Model It Up") as designer Napoleon Fontaine and in 2013 on Modern Family in the episode "The Big Game", and in 2014 as Mr. Eloquence on Real Husbands of Hollywood. Anthony-Rodriguez voices the role of Nick Mendoza in the video game Battlefield Hardline. In 2015, he was announced as the voice of the Imperial Inquisitor, the Fifth Brother on the Disney XD animated series Star Wars Rebels.

== Filmography ==
=== Film ===
Year	Title	Role	Note(s)
1997	Academy Boyz	Luis	
1998	Undercurrent	Carlos Rivera, Jr.	
2003	I Wrote That One, Vol. 1	Various	Video short
2003	SW 2.5. (The Pitch Wars)	Quentin Tarantino, Spike Lee, James Ivory, Joel Coen, Andy Wachowski, Bobby Farrelly, Yoda, Anakin Buzz Lightyear, First AD	Voice role Short
2003	I Wrote That One, Vol. 2	Various	Video short
2005	Bathsheba	The Messenger	Short
2007	InAlienable	Dr. Braxton	
2008	The Ode	Nelson	Short
2008	Waiting For Yvette	Luis	Short
2009	He Likes Guys	Luis	Segment: "Waiting for Yvette"
2010	Madea's Big Happy Family	Dr. Evans	Video
2010	Assisting Venus	Leo	
2011	Madea's Big Happy Family	Dr. Evans	
2013	Lost and Found	Detective Castillo	Short
2013	The Book of Daniel	Belshazzar	
2015	Madea's Tough Love	Officer Frank	Voice
2017	Odious	Mark	
2019	Justice League vs. the Fatal Five	Mano	Voice
2019	Curious George: Royal Monkey	King Gustavo	Voice
2021	Tango Shalom	Host	

=== Television ===
Year	Title	Role	Note(s)
1995	New York News		Episode: "Cost of Living"
1995	The City	Bernardo Castro	Episode: "1.25"
1997	Law & Order	Male juror	Episode: "Denial"
2000	Third Watch	Georgio	Episode: "Just Another Night at the Opera"
2000	Law & Order	Doorman	Episode: "Stiff"
2002	Street Time	Enrique Abascal	Episode: "Good Deeds"
2002	Becker	Singer	Episode: "Chris-Mess"
2003	Dragnet	SID Tech #2	Episode: "All That Glitters"
2003	Star Trek: Enterprise	Juan	Episode: "Horizon"
2003–2004	Jake 2.0	Kyle Duarte	16 episodes
2004	JAG	Gunnery Sergeant Mark Burrell	Episode: "Corporate Raiders"
2004	Higglytown Heroes	Furnish Repairman	Voice, episode: "All Warm Inside"
2005	CSI: Miami	Jeff Colson	Episode: "Payback"
2006	In Justice	Sgt. DeMeo	Episode: "Badge of Honor"
2006	Untitled Patricia Heaton Project	Mr. Reid	Television film
2007	NCIS	Lloyd Jackson	Episode: "Skeletons"
2007	Shark	Louis Menashi	Episode: "In Absentia"
2008–2012	The Secret Life of the American Teenager	Rubien Enriquez	51 episodes
2008	Privileged	Len	Episode: "All About Appearances"
2008	Eli Stone	Michael Pelfrey	Episode: "Owner of a Lonely Heart"
2009	CSI: NY	Lt. John Malley	Episode: "Rush to Judgement"
2009	Hannah Montana	Shawn Nahnah	Episode: "Papa's Got a Brand-New Friend"
2009	24	Tom Chapman	4 episodes
2009	NUMB3RS	Marcus	Episode: "Greatest Hits"
2009	Meet the Browns	Hector	Episode: "Meet the Real Dad"
2010	Dark Blue	ICE Agent Steven Clark, Nathan Clark	2 episodes
2010	Castle	Michael Grant	Episode: "Almost Famous"
2011	Shake It Up	Napoleon Fontaine	Episode: "Model It Up"
2012	Person of Interest	Rafeal Acosta	Episode: "C.O.D."
2012	Zeke and Luther	Quentin Del Toro	2 episodes
2013	Burn Notice	Pablo	Episode: "New Deal"
2013	The Nightmare Nanny	Detective Rodriguez	Television film
2013	Real Husbands of Hollywood	Mr. Eloquence	3 episodes
2013–2019	Modern Family	Tim	3 episodes
2013	Cinnamon Girl	Pablo Shroder	Television film
2014	Gang Related	Billy Cabreba	3 episodes
2014–2015	Grimm	Marcus Rispoli	13 episodes
2014	Madam Secretary	Manny Azucco	Episode: "Game On"
2015	The Mentalist	Darrell Gonzalez	Episode: "Green Light"
2015	Mike & Molly	Manny	Episode: "Buy the Book"
2015	NCIS: New Orleans	Navy Captain Michael Dawson	Episode: "The Insider"
2016	Star Wars Rebels	Fifth Brother, Rebel Trooper, Phoenix Squadron Pilot	Voice, 6 episodes
2017	Rosewood	Jamil Luther	Episode: "Mummies & Meltdowns"
2017	Queen of the South	Octavio	Episode: "El Precio de La Fe"
2017	The Orville	Fadolin	Episode: "Mad Idolatory"
2018	Alex, Inc.	Nelson Munoz	Episode: "The Nanny"
2018	Hawaii Five-O	Commander Parks	Episode: "Ka Lala Kaukonakona Haki ʻOle I Ka Pa A Ka Makani Kona"
2018	Days of Our Lives	Miguel Garcia	12 episodes
2018	Reverie	Daniel Baez	Episode: "No More Mr. Nice Guy"
2018	Homecoming	Roman	Episode: "Protocol"
2019	Speechless	Omar	Episode: "THE S-T-A-- STAIRCASE"
2019	The Morning Show	Gabriel	3 episodes
2019	Why Women Kill	Hector	3 episodes
2020	Tommy	Rascal Santos	4 episodes
2020	The Resident	Miguel Espinoza	Episode: "Burn It All Down"
2021	Shameless	Officer Dubois	Episode: "Survivors"
2021	9-1-1	Edgar Hill	Episode: "Ghost Stories"
2021–2022	SEAL Team	Greg Smith	4 episodes
2022	S.W.A.T.	Rafa	Episode: "Survive"
2022	Magnum P.I.	Pete Ashby	Episode: "Evil Walk Softly"
2022	Good Trouble	Marc Tavez	2 episodes
2023	NCIS: Los Angeles	CIA Officer Rafael Coates	Episode: "The Reckoning"
2024	Quantum Leap	Chief Garcia	Episode: "As the World Burns"
2024	Jurassic World: Chaos Theory	Dudley Cabrera	Voice, 3 episodes
2024	The Lincoln Lawyer	Adam Suarez	4 episodes
2026	The Night Agent	David Hutson	3 episodes

=== Video games ===
Year	Title	Role	Note(s)
2002	Grand Theft Auto: Vice City	Maurice Chavez	
2005	True Crime: New York City	Director	
2006	Saints Row	Victor Rodriguez	
2006	Grand Theft Auto: Vice City Stories	Maurice Chavez	
2006	The Sopranos: Road to Respect	Additional voices	
2006	SOCOM U.S. Navy SEALs: Combined Assault	Aztec	
2007	Spider-Man 3	Additional voices	
2008	Saints Row 2	Additional voices	
2008	Command & Conquer: Red Alert 3	Additional voices	
2008	Too Human	Jansen, Ivor, Berserker, Male Civilian #2	
2009	Red Faction: Guerilla	Additional voices	
2009	Dragon Age: Origins	Disciple Harvard, Templar Dreamer, Dust Town Beggar, Fade Mage Instructor, Proving Spectator, Royal Place Servant	
2009	Warhammer 40,000: Dawn of War II	Thaddeus, Nemerian, Rangers, Eldar, Guardians, Warp Spiders	
2010	Halo: Reach	Noble Six - Male	
2010	Blur	Casimiro	
2010	Warhammer 40,000: Dawn of War II: Chaos Rising	Thaddeus, Eldar	
2010	Call of Duty: Black Ops	Additional voices	
2011	Warhammer 40,000: Dawn of War II: Retribution	Eldar Male, Eldar Voice of God	
2011	Driver: San Francisco	Additional voices	
2011	Ace Combat: Assault Horizon	Jose "Guts" Gutierrez	
2011	Uncharted: Golden Abyss	Mercenary, Thug	
2011	Dead Space 2	Additional voices	
2013	Metal Gear Rising: Revengeance	Samuel Rodrigues	
2014	Metal Gear Solid V: Ground Zeroes	Soldiers	
2014	Infamous: Second Son	Concrete Pawn #1	
2014	Call of Duty: Advanced Warfare	Additional voices	
2015	White Night	Player, Narrator	
2015	Battlefield Hardline	Nicholas Mendoza	
2015	Metal Gear Solid V: The Phantom Pain	Soldiers	
2015	Fallout 4	Sturges, Scott Edwards	
2015	Rise of the Tomb Raider	Jacob	
2017	Ghost Recon: Wildlands	El Gato	
2018	Just Cause 4	Javi, People of Solis	
2023	Call of Duty: Modern Warfare III	Ricardo "Corso" Vargas	
