= List of The Latest Buzz episodes =

The Latest Buzz is a Canadian teen sitcom that was created by Brent Piaskoski for Family. In series, a struggling youth magazine, Teen BUZZ, replaces its staff with actual teens. Instead of being in class, five young 14 year-old writers take their last period of the day at the magazine’s office, learning about the fast-paced world of publishing. It premiered on September 1, 2007 and ended on April 19, 2010, with a total of 65 episodes over the course of 3 seasons.

== Series overview ==
Season	Episodes	Originally released	
Season	Episodes	First released	Last released
1	13	September 1, 2007	December 15, 2007
2	26	September 5, 2008	April 6, 2009
3	26	April 20, 2009	April 19, 2010

== Episodes ==
=== Season 1 (2007) ===
No.	Title	Written by	Original release date	Prod. code
1	"The First Issue"	Brent Piaskoski	September 1, 2007	101
Teen Buzz hires real teens to write for the magazine. Rebecca struggles to write her column and can't even think of a title for it, but help comes from an unexpected source. Noah and Michael prank each other, and Wilder can't figure out an old video game from the '80s. At the end Rebecca throws her hat up to the ceiling and it doesn't come down and DJ says it happened to her when she first started.(The hat bit is done also in the series finale with Rebecca's replacement Lucy) Guest starring: Genelle Williams, Jeff Geddis and Daniel Rojas
2	"The Parrot Issue"	Miles G. Smith	September 8, 2007	102
The team becomes crazy about the "Locco Locco", a novelty dance led by a parrot named Poco, except for Noah who gets taken up by DJ on a joke proposal about him interviewing Poco, while Rebecca interviews Noah for an article about smart alecks. However, some problems involving Pocco go on at the Buzz, and he flies outside. Meanwhile, Michael obsesses over a guy's "nice tie" comment after Amanda tells him it may have been sarcasm, and Wilder is confused over whom to choose for his mentor. In the end, Noah sings the Locco Locco to help Rebecca dance and get Pocco to come back because Noah seems to like Rebecca.
3	"The Competition Issue"	Vera Santamaria	September 15, 2007	103
Wilder teaches Amanda the game "Dance Your Socks Off" and Amanda gets hooked on it; Rebecca persuades Michael to be friendly with Noah, so Michael invites him to a basketball game. Noah ditches him, so Michael pulls the ultimate prank. Meanwhile, Shepherd and DJ find out that they had crushes on each other in high school. Guest starring: Jeff Geddis, Daniel Rojas, Genelle Williams
4	"The Cover Boy Issue"	Jeff Biederman	September 22, 2007	104
The Teen Buzz team becomes jealous when only Noah makes the front page for a cover of "City Rhythm" and the rest of the team gets placed on an underflap. Rebecca investigates the plagiarism of her media studies paper, only to find that her teacher was behind it. Guest starring: Dylan Everett, Jeff Geddis
5	"The Obsession Issue"	Barbara Haynes	October 13, 2007	105
Noah and Wilder fight over a cool jacket they get from the set of Pizza Patrol; Amanda and Rebecca have to do a school presentation together for Mr. Shepherd's class. Michael obsesses over a phone call with his idol, Kelly Clarkson. Guest starring: Jeff Geddis
6	"The Extreme Issue"	Michael Gelbart	October 20, 2007	106
Rebecca tries skateboarding with disastrous results for Wilder; Noah and Amanda interview a singer with an interesting past, and Michael tries to get the perfect paparazzi shot for the magazine. Guest starring: Jeff Geddis, Julia Schneider
7	"The Cheerleading Issue"	Brent Piaskoski	October 27, 2007	107
After teasing Mr. Shepherd for being on the spirit squad when he was young, Michael and Rebecca must try out for the team at Ernie Coombs High. When Rebecca gets selected, Michael feels left out. Noah and Wilder fight over sharing a locker, Amanda has to wear ugly shoes after hurting her ankle, and Shepherd searches for a goofy picture of DJ. Guest starring: Jeff Geddis
8	"The School Dance Issue"	Brent Piaskoski	November 3, 2007	108
Amanda and Rebecca debate over who is the subject of a song Noah wrote. Wilder tries to dance with as many girls as possible at the dance and Michael tries to ruin it for him. Guest starring: Jeff Geddis
9	"The Infamous Issue"	Vera Santamaria	November 10, 2007	109
Rebecca's hilariously bad dancing leaks online on Glee Tube and she becomes a laughing stock; Michael gets a chance to be on Entertainment Wow and it goes to his head; and Noah takes credit for a magazine idea of Wilder's. Guest starring: Jeff Geddis
10	"The Live Issue"	Barbara Haynes	November 17, 2007	110
Michael D'Ascenzo from Naturally, Sadie guest stars for a live webcast on the Buzz website, but things get bad when his girlfriend dumps him via text message. Amanda tries to rediscover her fashion identity and models clothes from a number of designers, and when Wilder gets ridiculous about his alien beliefs, Noah tricks him into reading a fake letter online. Guest starring: Michael D'Ascenzo, Jeff Geddis, Genelle Williams
11	"The Deadline Issue"	Barbara Haynes and Miles G. Smith	November 24, 2007	111
The Teen Buzz gang must pull together an issue at the last minute. Everything goes wrong, from Michael and Rebecca's argument about their friendship, to Amanda's emotional wreck of a super model to Noah's botched cover story to Wilder causing an office-wide power failure. With Genelle Williams & Bjanka Murgel as Karina
12	"The Taking Charge Issue"	Vera Santamaria	December 1, 2007	112
Rebecca must work with Teen Buzz's TV columnist Cody Herman; Wilder blabs Michael's juicy celebrity scoop (or so it seems); and Amanda breaks Noah's guitar so she has to be his personal assistant. Guest starring: Genelle Williams, Stephen Joffe
13	"The Gala Issue"	Brent Piaskoski	December 15, 2007	113
Teen Buzz is nominated for a Glimmer Award. DJ has stage fright, Amanda "babysits" Wilder, Noah insults Rebecca and she gives him the silent treatment, leading to a surprising confession from him. Michael has a clothing catastrophe. Guest starring: Genelle Williams, Jeff Geddis

=== Season 2 (2008–09) ===
Guest starring:Genelle Williams, Jeff Geddis and James Edward Campbell

No.	Title	Written by	Original release date	Prod. code
14	"The Dating Issue"	Brent Piaskoski	September 5, 2008	201
Rebecca and Noah go on a homework date; Michael vows to change his ways and becomes more zen; and Wilder rents himself out to advertisers. Guest-starring: Genelle Williams, Jeff Geddis Note: This episode premiered as a season 2 sneak peek.
15	"The Parents Issue"	Barbara Haynes	September 5, 2008	202
Teen Buzz is up for a visit from the parents. The kids learn valuable things about themselves and their parents. Guest-starring: Genelle Williams, Jeff Geddis, Fraser Young, David Huband Note: This episode premiered along with the season premiere as a season 2 sneak peek.
16	"The Sneaky Issue"	Sean Jara	October 17, 2008	203
Michael has a new girlfriend, but Amanda worries she may not be as sweet as Michael believes. Wilder trains Rebecca for a waitressing gig, and Noah plays off Shepherd and DJ to get out of detention. Guest starring: Genelle Williams, Jeff Geddis, Jordan Hudyma
17	"The Power Tripping Issue"	Heather Jackson	October 24, 2008	204
Rebecca runs for president with Michael as her campaign manager, Amanda and Noah write a column together, and Wilder gets mad about some online criticism of his column. Guest starring: Genelle Williams, Jeff Geddis, Stephen Joffe
18	"The Halloween Issue"	Heather Jackson	October 31, 2008	205
The power goes out before the Halloween Dance, so the group is stuck at Teen Buzz waiting for DJ and Mr. Shepherd to fix it. The friends each take turns to see who can tell the scariest story. Guest-starring: Thomas Chambers, Munro Chambers' twin brother
19	"The Showdown Issue"	Darrin Rows and Fraser Young	November 7, 2008	206
Michael and Wilder compete at dodgeball, Wilder is shocked to find out that Michael won. All the sporty guys want to hang out with Michael instead of Wilder. They have a rematch to find out who is the ultimate champion of dodge ball. Meanwhile Amanda fails Rebecca's flirting quiz. She's disappointed because she thought she was the flirting queen. When she finally gives up on flirting she gives it another chance at the rematch dodgeball game. Wilder is captivated by Amanda and gets distracted and loses again. Amanda is happy she still has the touch. Meanwhile this all happens Noah sees a gorilla! When in real life it was all of them playing a silly prank on him. This episode featured the old WWE title belt as the dodgeball championship. Guest starring: Genelle Williams, Jeff Geddis
20	"The Peer Pressure Issue"	Michael Gelbart	November 21, 2008	207
When Amanda's friend Caitlin visits, she's mean to Amanda's friends but Amanda won't listen. Noah, Wilder, Rebecca and Michael decide to confront Amanda and tell what's been going on. Amanda doesn't believe it until Caitlin makes fun of Rebecca in front of her. Amanda is upset when she sees one of her friends hurt by her best friend and their friendship ends. Amanda says that if she did not join buzz and have great friends, she'd still be mean. Rebecca gets her first cell phone but can't really figure how to work it that well. The boys enter a televised Pizza Patrol contest, even though Michael can't stand the show. Michael pretends he's in love with the show so Wilder and Noah would continue to be his friends. Michael is worried that if he told them they wouldn't like him for who he is. During the competition Michael is on fire; he answers the questions like he really knew the show. But freaks out at the final questions and confesses how he hates the show. But turns out what he was saying was correct. Wilder and Noah reassured Michael they liked him for who he is and that they would always be friends Guest starring: Genelle Williams, Jeff Geddis and Hannah Lochner Note: This episode was shown as part of Family Channel's Bully Awareness Week '08
21	"The Fake Out Issue"	Terry Saltsman	November 28, 2008	208
There is a fashion show at Buzz and Amanda is excited. She thinks she is going to be a model but is shocked to find out Wilder is chosen above her. Wilder hits the runway and does his silly walk. Amanda laughs, thinking he would screw up. But, in fact, the audience loved it. Wilder's move on the runway became famous and is called the "Wilder Windmill" which people all over the world are doing. Amanda sees that she can make Wilder into a star. Amanda exploits Wilder, giving him work to do. When wilder finally gets fed up with Amanda making him do shows and performances and charging people for his work. Wilder doesn't know how to tell Amanda and is sad. Amanda finally sees that she has pushed him to his limit. She cancels all the shows and performances she booked for Wilder and she apologizes. Noah picks Michael as his wingman to discover Rebecca's feelings. But Noah tells Michael he no longer needs his help anymore, Noah wants to fly solo. Michael is a little disappointed. Rebecca thinks DJ is going to fire her. When Rebecca overhears a private conversation between DJ and the head boss. She hears DJ say that Rebecca should be the one to let go. When Rebecca give them a presentation on why she should stay at buzz she handcuffs herself to her desk, refusing to leave. When she finds out DJ really wasn't going to fire her in the first place. Guest starring: Genelle Williams, Jeff Geddis
22	"The It Girl Issue"	Brent Piaskoski	November 28, 2008	209
Amanda coaches Rebecca for an under-cover modeling assignment with Karina, while the boys try to make a cool GleeTube video to meet girls. Guest starring: Genelle Williams, Jeff Geddis, Bjanka Murgel as Karina
23	"The Rock Out Issue"	Sean Jara	December 5, 2008	210
Noah interviews a rock star who only says "Rock On!" He and Rebecca accidentally record themselves insulting him, and the tape ends up in the rockstar's possession. They dress up as bell hops and sneak into the star's hotel room to retrieve the tape. Wilder and Big Wilder compete in an air guitar competition; Michael lends Amanda money.
24	"The Face the Music Issue"	Barbara Haynes	December 12, 2008	211
Amanda acts as a liaison for singer Sherrie Overwood, and Sherrie decides to quit show business; Michael and Wilder are hall monitors; and Noah tries to cure Rebecca's hiccups by kissing her, but after managing to cure them, he ends up getting them himself. Sherrie lets Amanda sing at the end of the show. This is the episode where Noah and Rebecca share their very first kiss!
25	"The Happy Holidays Issue"	Brent Piaskoski	December 19, 2008	212
Christmas time has come and this year everyone gets a Secret Santa. Amanda hires a party planner, but everything is a disaster. Wilder wants to get a fabulous gift for Amanda, but what she wants costs too much. Rebecca was giving Noah an mp3 player but then found out that he was giving her a baseball, so she got him a shirt. At the end he told her he lied about getting her a baseball.he only said that to throw her off. He knew that she sent Michael to find out what he got her. Michael wanted Amanda to get him something big and DJ thought that Shepherd got her a ring, but he really got her a whistle.
26	"The Star Power Issue"	Darrin Rows and Fraser Young	January 2, 2009	213
Rebecca writes about healthy eating and tries to get Wilder to eat better. Noah, Michael, Wilder and Amanda compete to interview star Ashley Leggat, while Mr. Shepherd tries to get on the dance show "C'lebs and Schlubs" with Ashley as his partner, but DJ won't allow this.
27	"The Second Chances Issue"	Michael Gelbart	January 9, 2009	214
Wilder meets Amanda's dad and they get super competitive with each other. Noah learns how he got his job at Teen Buzz, and Michael fears the prediction of a psychic about him going bald. Guest Starring: Genelle Williams, Jeff Geddis
28	"The Wonderful Wizard of Buzz Issue"	Brent Piaskoski	January 16, 2009	215
Rebecca (Dorothy) is torn between going to the 'Kansas' concert with her Dad or the Emerald Gala with her friends. Noah (Tin Man) obsesses over Rebecca and over asking her out, Wilder (Scarecrow) loses a pig's brain from science class, Michael (Lion) must find the courage to tell DJ he used the company credit card. Amanda's (Wicked Witch) face turns green from a beauty mask and she gets very angry at Rebecca because she is wearing Amanda's favorite red mood-changing shoes.
29	"The First Impressions Issue"	Sean Jara	January 23, 2009	216
After being told Rebecca's article needs to be rewritten, the group is stuck helping Rebecca instead of going to a concert. They all talk about their first impressions of each other, resulting in many flashbacks. Noah first thought Rebecca was a nerd, Wilder lies that he does not remember Amanda, and Michael thought Wilder was a genius. After several misunderstandings, everyone makes up and Noah kisses his new girlfriend Rebecca.
30	"The Makeover Issue"	Barbara Haynes	January 30, 2009	217
Wilder becomes the school's mascot, but it becomes too much for him to handle so he asks for Noah's help. Rebecca wants to sit at the cool table for her article, so Amanda gives Rebecca a makeover. Michael starts wearing platform shoes, because of the comment someone made of his height.
31	"The Breakup Issue"	Scott Oh	February 13, 2009	218
Rebecca and Amanda get into a fight over a Sherrie Overwood pen that Amanda lost; Noah gives a (very!) young singer a bad review, but runs scared when the singer harasses him (with pies); Michael sets Wilder up with a famous skater girl named Vikki Zee so that he can write a gossip article about their relationship.
32	"The Pet Peeves Issue"	Darrin Rows and Fraser Young	March 2, 2009	219
Amanda's dad says she is too old for her pony and says he is going to take him away so she hides it at Teen Buzz; Michael needs to know what the others hate about him for an article, so he asks Rebecca, which results in a dispute. Noah is peeved by Wilder, who keeps scamming his food.
33	"The Secrets Issue"	Michael Gelbart	March 3, 2009	220
Noah discovers that Rebecca has not yet told Mr. Harper about their relationship. Michael wants to know Wilder's full name at all costs. Amanda has to write an article on celebrities' first kisses, giving lipstick to people who tell their story. Sadly she has never kissed anyone, but someone at the Buzz may change that...
34	"The Shape Up Issue"	Ramona Barckert	March 4, 2009	221
Priscilla, Amanda's rival from Teen Buzz France, arrives in town for fashion week. Rebecca does a fitness test with Noah helping her train, but in the end there are more positive results for Rebecca than for Noah. Wilder wants to beat the world record for a videogame, Chomper Chuck.
35	"The Super Crush Issue"	Barbara Haynes	March 5, 2009	222
Yolanda, an old friend of Michael who's obsessed with him, comes to Ernie C High. Michael does everything to avoid her, but has to do a science project with her. She is weird but sweet and Michael breaks her heart. Noah wrote a joke on the internet (Glee-a-pedia!) that Rebecca is rap star Crush Party Ice. Amanda seeks to get Wilder's attention when she notices he acts differently around his friends.
36	"The Boy Trouble Issue"	Sean Jara	March 6, 2009	223
George, a well-known singer, arrives at Teen Buzz. Rebecca thinks that George is flirting with her. When she confronts Noah about it, Noah seems to not care and doesn't think George would do that. Rebecca is upset that Noah isn't jealous and doesn't believe that George would be flirting with her. George then ask Rebecca to be in his music video and she accepts. Rebecca still doesn't believe Noah is just a little bit jealous. When during the music video George calls Rebecca " R" and Noah is furious. He says he is the only one allowed to call her R and he tries to mess up the video. Michael and Wilder take Mr. Shepherd's ukulele class, but accidentally break his golden ukulele. Meanwhile, after their horrible dating experiences, Amanda and DJ both decide to go on a dating strike. But when George's cute younger brother comes Amanda can't resist and breaks the dating strike. While DJ is left with no one and tries to go back to George for his offer to go to coffee. Guest-starring: George Nozuka, Philip Nozuka
37	"The Kiss Off Issue"	Barbara Haynes	March 16, 2009	224
Michael Gelbart, a television journalist, comes to do a show on The Buzz. He films the life at teen buzz. But the movie cameras capture a lot more than the friends anticipate – a victory kiss between Wilder and Rebecca. They try to explain to Noah and the camera that a victory kiss doesn't count but Noah thinks it does and gets mad at Wilder. Meanwhile, Noah tricks Amanda into getting him great concert tickets and a fancy ride to the concert, but she finds out and gets mad at him, and Michael keeps annoying Michael Gelbart. But they forget about all that when the boss threatens to shut down The Buzz for a cat magazine. They do what they can to look professional so they can keep their jobs. They soon find out that it's not about what the boss thinks, it's about what their readers think. They end up keeping their jobs when the boss decides to move the cat magazine to Newmarket. Rebecca ends up kissing all the boys.
38	"The Boys vs. Girls Issue"	Sean Jara	March 23, 2009	225
The crew of the Latest Buzz get into the Battle of the Genders. Noah and Rebecca get into a spelling competition with Mr. Shepard hosting and giving Noah all the easy words. Later, Noah realizes how Rebecca always acknowledges his jokes even if they aren't funny, though when Rebecca does some thing smart he always calls her a nerd. He ends the competition in a draw. Michael and Amanda get into a competition on fashion, Michael tricks Amanda into feeling sorry for him and letting him win. She finds out and gets really mad. Wilder and DJ get into competitions where Wilder always wins, until finally DJ beats him at double dutch. Note: This episode premiered as part of Family Channel's Superstar Spring event.
39	"The Summer Bash Issue"	Brent Piaskoski	April 6, 2009	226
Noah has an interview with a singer-Zuzu Moon. They get along very well with each other. That makes Rebecca jealous. Later, Zuzu Moon asks Noah if he wants to go on tour with her for the holidays and he agrees. Rebecca is very disappointed and fears that Zuzu Moon will take Noah away from her. Amanda's dad loses all of their money so Amanda can't go to Camp Shop-A-Lot in Paris. Wilder let's Amanda join him and his family in Mexico. But later Amanda's father regains all of their money again, so Amanda then decides to go on vacation with her dad and her stepmother. Wilder is upset and hurt by her decision. Meanwhile, Mr. Shepard and DJ admit their true feelings for one another and Michael is excited that he might end up in a movie. The episode ends with a cliffhanger. Note: This episode premiered as part of Family Channel's Day of Premieres. On family.ca fans voted for the ending, on April 20, 2009 the ending was revealed.

=== Season 3 (2009–10) ===
No.	Title	Written by	Original release date	Prod. code
40	"The Back To School Issue"	Brent Piaskoski	April 20, 2009	301
Rebecca accidentally blurts to Noah that she kissed a boy in Paris over the summer and Noah gets mad and breaks up with Rebecca. Amanda is eager to get her first kiss with Wilder so he pretends he's totally cool with Amanda having ditched him but ends up in a grudge again. Micheal gets a role in a movie and gets mad at his agent because the trailer of the movie has Micheal with a 'chipmunk' voice. Note: Season 3 aired in Australia from September 14th, 2009.
41	"The Hot Or Not Issue"	Barbara Haynes	April 27, 2009	302
Rebecca plans to write an exposé article on the annual Ernie C Hot List, but then she's on it. Amanda and Michael are determined to forget their Summer in explosive fashion. They put all their stuff that was from summer memories, in a box and told Amanda's Daddy's assistant to blow it up. Michael then got a phone call from his agent and he found out the movie Michael made was a hit, so he takes his summer memories out of the box. Amanda and Michael throw a pity party and no one shows up so they're very happy. Michael then finds out the Amanda took the memories out of the box. Now their boxes will be blown up. and Wilder stole Noah's chair because his chair was not comfy and Noah wants his chair back, so Noah lies and he gets the chair. DJ doesn't think the exposé article is right for buzz because she didn't go on the hot list, so she wants Rebecca to make a negative article. Rebecca thinks DJ is being selfish. Wilder finds out Noah was lying so Wilder takes Noah's chair from his home. Rebecca then makes an Anti List instead of an exposé article.
42	"The Love Me, Love Me Not Issue"	Darrin Rose	May 4, 2009	303
Zuzu Moon, the girl who Noah followed on tour for the Summer, guest edits the magazine for a week. She befriends Rebecca, and starts stalking Noah. No one believes Noah until the end, when Rebecca walks in and catches her. Zuzu and Rebecca proceed to have a sword fight with an umbrella and poster, and Noah ends up covered in food. Over to Amanda, Wilder and Michael- They all have a bet to see who can last longer without a cell phone. Wilder loses almost straight away, but he competes to make it harder for the other two to win. Amanda wins in the end.
43	"The Weekend Issue"	Matt Schiller	May 11, 2009	304
Wilder, Michael and Noah plan to go to the carnival, but are forced to babysit Noah's little sister instead. She then convinces them to play hide-and-seek, but they can not find her. Amanda gives Rebecca's bedroom a makeover. When Rebecca sees her new bedroom, she hates it.
44	"The Just Friends Issue"	Brent Piaskoski	May 18, 2009	305
Elliot, the boy Rebecca kissed in Paris over the summer, visits Teen Buzz. Everyone loves him, but Noah is suspicious. Rebecca claims they are just friends. Amanda discovers her cooking skills with Wilder's help, and ends up participating in a cooking contest that Wilder was supposed to be going in. He then booby-trapped her dish with mini explosives. Elliot gives a locket to Rebecca with a picture of him, but in the end she replaces it with the heart shaped guitar pick that Noah gave her. Guest Star: Daniel Magder as Elliot
45	"The Love Triangle Issue"	Barbara Haynes	October 5, 2009	306
Michael tries to woo Amanda, but needs help from Wilder to do it. Wilder, however, thinks Michael is trying to woo another girl. Amanda promotes some new lipstick, but one of the flavours doesn't work so well. Noah finds out Rebecca has not told her dad they have broken up and they start planning to tell him but in the end Rebecca says it in a way that wasn't planned. Features Brittany Adams of "Winging It"
46	"The Date Night Issue"	Darrin Rose	October 12, 2009	307
When Wilder finds out that Michael and Amanda are going out, he gets mad. He decides to bring Yolanda Farquhar to their date to sabotage it. Rebecca bonds with DJ while reading letters sent by readers. Noah makes fun of Mr Shepherd for liking mime. At the end, Wilder and Amanda end up dancing together, and Yolanda and Michael are together.
47	"The Double Trouble Issue"	Fraser Young	October 19, 2009	308
Michael and Noah pretend to be models so they could meet girls. But they end up getting two double dates at the same time. Wilder tries to make Rebecca believe aliens exist, but she's not convinced. Amanda gets upset when she finds out her step mum is having a baby.
48	"The Bollywood Issue (The Jai Ho Issue)"	Brent Piaskoski	October 26, 2009	309
Noah interviews a Bollywood leading lady, who he likes. He then learns about Indian culture to impress her. Mr Shepherd is nominated for the teacher of the year award and Wilder and Michael help with his campaign. Amanda shows Rebecca the world of the stock market. Rebecca starts to get addicted to it, so DJ tries to help her. Mr. Shepherd loses the teacher of the year award. There is a hint at the end that Noah and Rebecca might get back together after all. Guest starring: Nikki Shah as Bollywood star Lakshina Sumati
49	"The Bully Issue"	Michael Gelbart	November 20, 2009	310
Michael and Yolanda start to date, but Michael realizes she is controlling him and everything he does. Rebecca wants Wilder to teach her how to play a video game. When Wilder beats her and reaches the next level, he starts to brag and make fun of her. Noah and Amanda are doing a video on bullying and Noah starts to take full control and Amanda doesn't like it. In the end Wilder, Noah and Yolanda discover that they are actually bullying Amanda, Rebecca, and Micheal. Note: This episode aired on Family Channel Friday November 20th, 2009 as part of Bullying Awareness Week.
50	"The Truth Hurts Issue"	Will McRobb	December 7, 2009	311
When Noah's dad tells him he and Noah's mom are splitting up, Noah tries to out-lawyer his Dad to prove that his parents should stay together. Rebecca gets a review of her clothing on an online blog Sanchez Bilton (Perez Hilton) and Michael is surprised. He then tries stealing her style, but only gets a bad review. Meanwhile, Amanda and Big Wilder are trying to convince Wilder that Groundhog Day is not a real holiday.
51	"The Career Day Issue"	Barbara Haynes	December 14, 2009	312
Rebecca competes with Amanda for the attention of young journalists at the Buzz Open House. Snowboarder Crispin Lipscombe ticks off his old friend Wilder, when he steals Wilder's catch-phrase (Awestruck). Michael is in need of a band when he hires the wrong thing. He then hires Noah who seems to be tone-deaf.
52	"The Into The Future Issue"	Brent Piaskoski	January 4, 2010	313
The gang gets a glimpse of what their lives might look like in 20 years. Their future turns out not what they expected. Wilder is obese, single and successful, Michael is bald and Amanda's agent and husband, Amanda is a famous singer and married to Michael, Rebecca is an unsuccessful journalist and lonely and Noah is Wilder's man servant and also unsuccessful and lonely. In the end Noah and Rebecca share a kiss and get back together. Shepard proposes to DJ and she says yes.
53	"The Buzz Club Issue"	Darrin Rose	January 5, 2010	314
With the entire gang stuck in Buzz Detention for the day, Noah accidentally tells Rebecca the bracelet he gave her was originally bought for Zuzu Moon. Shepard gets stuck in the wilderness and Michael tries to get him back and Amanda gets angry because Wilder writes in a Quiz that someone else is his crush and not her. Wilder becomes the leader and comes up with a plan to rescue Mr Shepard. The plan is taking a while to be put into action so Michael nominates himself as the leader, naming himself "Colonel". He asks Rebecca and Noah to go and unplug the phone detector from DJ's office instead of tormenting each other. As there in DJ's office they struggle to find a way to unplug the phone detector. Eventually they do so with Rebecca saying random things and end up being in there for longer because Rebecca told DJ that Noah gave a bracelet that he gave to Zuzu to her. DJ then lectures Noah about giving all gifts to the Friendly Samaritans of Hope. Amanda gets Michael a sandwich, but DJ is almost there, so Wilder rescues her and becomes her hero.
54	"The Extreme Shakespeare Issue"	Barbara Haynes	January 6, 2010	315
To help Wilder with his book report, Michael tells him the story of 'The Taming of the Shrew'. In this story Amanda is the shrew and no one likes her. Rebecca and Noah have to go on a double date (to a ball) with Amanda and someone else so they get Wilder to go with Amanda. Micheal realizes all these famous people will be at the ball so he blackmails Rebecca and tries to get her to go with him instead. Note:The theme song is in a medieval style.
55	"The Mum's The Word Issue"	Michael Gelbart	January 7, 2010	316
DJ hires Michael's mom to help organize the Buzz office, which drives everyone up the wall. Wilder decides not to do anything to Michael's mom due to one of the "dude rules"; mothers before brothers. He then cracks after Michael lies and tells him his mother destickered his skateboard (his stickers remind him about a special time). This annoys him as Michael's mom broke another "dude rule"; skating before hating. Michael is then forced to talk to his mother and she gives a surprising reaction; great joy due to the fact that her son can apparently is the best at firing people. Rebecca decides that it is her turn to be the class clown and decides to do a stand-up comedy routine at The Blurb. Her jokes are definitely unfunny and when Noah explains that to her that she is funny naturally, she thinks he's just acting jealous because she's funnier and he doesn't listen. On the night, her act starts to bomb but Noah cracks a joke and she begins to crack jokes naturally. Amanda receives a coupon from her step mother for babysitting and asks Wilder for help. He shows her an orb for baby practicing and gives it to her to practice. Amanda seems to be going really well, with high scores, but really she is keeping the baby with Daddy's Assistant and instead is using a watermelon. Wilder finds out and is angry at her because she lied and because she put an innocent fruit in danger. She then explains that it was cold and distant so she thought she wasn't doing to well and gave the orb to Daddy's Assistant. Wilder then explains the orb is meant to be like that and accepts Amanda's apology.
56	"The Third Wheel Issue"	Fraser Young	January 8, 2010	317
Rebecca, Noah and Wilder all end up being a third wheel as the trio try to balance their friendship to make it through a classic movie. The movie is called "Doggy Medschool", what seems to be a movie about a dog working as a doctor that features romance and relation to King Arthur and Camelot (Rebecca mentions this). Noah constantly teases an usher in the theater and says that he can't threaten them with anything apart from making them wear his uniform. Noah and Rebecca want to go on a date alone to watch the movie, but Wilder decides to join them. After being caught arguing really loud for the third time, the usher kicks them out and from the things he said they realize the usher heard them the whole time.
57	"The Plan B Issue"	Brian Hartigan	January 11, 2010	318
DJ discovers that Amanda's new recording contract was bought for her by her father. Michael gives Rebecca his old phone after he gets a new GleePhone (a parody of the iPhone), but Michael becomes mean to Rebecca when she tries to figure out how to use it, since she is awaiting an important call. Wilder and Noah are trying to beat the world record for keeping a balloon off the ground. In the end, Amanda gets a proposal for a singing contract from another company, and Michael and Rebecca go together to the Anne of Green Gables event and somebody accidentally pops the balloon before Wilder and Noah beat the record.
58	"The Comeback Issue"	Darrin Rose	January 12, 2010	319
Michael ruins Supermodel Karina's career by exposing that her boyfriend's hugely famous band, has broken up. Now, Michael has to repair Karina's career after her celebrity status breakdown. Wilder and Rebecca have to give each other peer reviews and Wilder says Rebecca's articles lack heart. Noah and Amanda get the job for announcing the morning announcements, and put their own comedic spin. Guest starring: Bjanka Murgel as Karina
59	"The Issue Issue"	Barbara Haynes	January 13, 2010	320
Rebecca realizes that Michael doesn't want to do old babyish things anymore and has new interests. She comes up with the idea to bring back an old dance/play from when they were younger called "Professor Swiggle", in which Rebecca dresses up in an Albert Einstein-type costume while Michael acts as her arms. This embarrasses Michael and he explains to Rebecca his interest in basketball. Noah interviews a down-to-earth teen musician who doesn't let his rock star personality get in the way, but when they go to put the interview in the magazine he refuses to agree (but in the beginning when Noah is interviewing him, they both don't seem to be getting off well). Amanda tries to impress Wilder with 'The Dress', she tries several outfits but they don't catch his attention, she only catches Wilder's attention when she is wearing a grey tracksuit pants and jacket. But then he stops paying attention to her to look at another girl who is wearing a glamorous outfit.
60	"The Switcheroo Issue"	Darrin Rose	January 14, 2010	321
The episode starts with Wilder writing a play on people who swap bodies, which then recaps to a time where the Teen Buzz crew all start to act like one another. Rebecca gets an 'F' on a test and starts to act like Wilder. Wilder starts acting (in a plot to wreck Amanda's date with another guy) like Amanda when he hears that Amanda is falling for a nerd who plays sports and is really cute. Amanda starts acting like Rebecca when Wilder tells her that the guy likes nerdy nerds. Noah and Michael switch when DJ gets sick of them mocking each other's jobs and tells them to switch jobs, until they start begging for their original assignments back.
61	"The Live From Teen Buzz Issue"	Brent Piaskoski	January 15, 2010	322
While the gang attempts to practice a song they've written for DJ and Mr. Shepherd's engagement party, Wilder announces he's leaving Buzz, so Noah traps him in a box until he agrees to stay. While DJ and Mr. Sheperd are inside the office because they did not want to ruin the surprise.
62	"The Hip Hop Issue"	Barbara Haynes	January 25, 2010	323
At the school dance, Wilder's challenged when Amanda brings a prince who looks exactly like him as her date. Noah wants to tell Rebecca that he loves her but can't say it, Rebecca hears him say it and she says that she loves him too and they share a kiss. Michael told DJ that he hired a hit deejay but he didn't and instead he dressed up as a deejay and named himself "Beat Boogaloo". Since DJ also wanted Michael to photograph the dance, Michael has to continuously change back and forth between Beat Boogaloo and Michael. He meets a girl named Chloe he fancies, except she only dates college boys, so he uses Beat Boogaloo to get closer to her. Eventually DJ calls out for Michael while he is in his Beat Boogaloo clothes and he has to confesses. Chloe is then annoyed and slightly angry and DJ and Mr. Shepard then become the deejays for the dance. DJ names herself "DJ squared" because of her name, combined with the fact that she is being a deejay. At the end of the episode Amanda and Wilder get together and become a couple. Guest Star: Thomas Chambers as Chase The Prince
63	"The You're Toast Issue"	Matt Schiller	April 5, 2010	324
Noah and Michael fight over a piece of toast that looks like a superstar. Wilder's dad and Amanda's dad are going to meet for the first time, but Wilder and Amanda think it will go horribly wrong. Rebecca gets DJ as a mentor and gives her own ideas to Bossman to change the magazine. The toast eventually ends up in DJ's coffee and she takes a bite before chucking it away when Noah and Michael explain that many people have touched it and that it has been ages since it was made.
64	"The Meet The Wilders Issue"	Brent Piaskoski	April 12, 2010	325
Noah discovers Wilder's sister Roxy is skimming cash from a charity event they're working on together. Rebecca and Michael join the drama club together.
65	"The Final Issue"	Brent Piaskoski and Barbara Haynes	April 19, 2010	326
The Boss announces that the Buzz staff will be replaced with a new wave of students. The entire gang is very surprised. Rebecca comes to the decision that she is going to fight for the Buzz. Noah is very casual about it, and when Rebecca explains to him about her plans for a Save Buzz rally/meeting with the boss, Noah tries to explain that everything has to come to an end, and that is why he isn't as hung up about it as he could be. Rebecca replies that, yes, everything does have to come to an end, including 'us'. Amanda tells Wilder that she is going to live with her real mother, to pursue her singing career. Wilder points out that there is so much that they haven't done yet, including Amanda having her first kiss. He then reveals that he has hired a famous singer/guitar player to play while they share their first kiss, but when Wilder reveals that he didn't vote for this guy, he gets rather angry, and Wilder runs out scared. Later, while Mr. Shepherd is talking about the final episodes of sitcoms, and how they are often the most watched episodes of the entire series, Wilder plans to publicly show his affection toward Amanda. But that backfires too, leaving Amanda desperate to share a kiss with Wilder. Michael gets offered a job in a movie alongside Dex Cobra, but he tells himself he can't take the part because every time his life is going right, it turns into a disaster. DJ tries to convince him otherwise, but he just won't listen, until Mr. Shepherd convinces him to say yes, which he does. He almost loses hope again when Dex Cobra is late to pick him up, but when he comes he is extremely excited. DJ is trying to plan her and Mr. Shepherd's wedding, a big traditional wedding with lots of guests, etc. Mr. Shepherd says that "he doesn't want this" and DJ takes it as him not wanting to marry her. Noah tells Rebecca that when his first article was published, he thought he couldn't be happier, but then he fell in love with Rebecca. He says that he had an incredible two years, and wouldn't want that opportunity to be taken away from anyone else. This makes Rebecca realize that although it is upsetting to leave the Buzz, it is for the best. At the airport, Wilder doesn't want to kiss Amanda because he wants it to be special. Amanda boards the plane in a huff, saying that the world is full of lips, and she will find a pair to kiss anyway, and Wilder sulks at the gate. Amanda returns, saying she got the plane to turn around, and convinces that Wilder that they don't have to be at a special place or time, or with special music playing, because they will be sharing the kiss with each other, and that is what makes it special. They share a very passionate kiss and Amanda doesn't board the plane again, going back to the office for a surprise event. Michael plans a "Pity Party" for DJ, which includes wearing her wedding dress and ruining everything that Mr. Shepherd gave her, but when they exit her office, in her full wedding dress she finds everyone there, set for a simple, but special wedding. Mr. Shepherd explains that it wasn't her he didn't want, it was the big fancy wedding; so they finally get married. Rebecca's replacement throws her hat up and it doesn't come down, and Rebecca says the exact lines to her new replacement that DJ said to Rebecca in her first week when she threw her hat up. Around a makeshift wedding cake, they all share a sentence or two to sum up their time at buzz. Rebecca says how her time at Buzz has expanded her family from just her Dad and Baba, and made it better. Michael tells of how he was always the outsider and that at Teen Buzz, everyone let him in. Noah explains that if he had his time at Buzz over again, he wouldn't do anything differently. They begin a toast to the Buzz, and then Wilder falls into the cake, making the moment go from almost perfect, to perfect. During the credits, each of the cast members say some things about their time acting in the Latest Buzz. Guest Starring: Canadian Idol contestant Mookie Morris as himself, Trevor Boris as the airport announcer and Taylor Dale as Lucy
