= Warehouse 13 season 4 =

Warehouse 13
- Season 4
- DVD cover art
- No. of episodes: 20

Release
- Original network: Syfy
- Original release: July 23, 2012 – July 8, 2013

Season chronology
- ← Previous; Season 3 Next → Season 5

The fourth season of the American television series Warehouse 13 premiered on July 23, 2012, on Syfy. The season consists of 20 episodes, and aired on Mondays; the first ten episodes aired at 9 pm, but the series moved to a 10 pm timeslot starting with the eleventh episode. The show stars Eddie McClintock, Joanne Kelly, Saul Rubinek, Allison Scagliotti, Genelle Williams and Aaron Ashmore.

== Cast ==
=== Main ===
- Eddie McClintock as Pete Lattimer
- Joanne Kelly as Myka Bering
- Saul Rubinek as Artie Nielsen
- Allison Scagliotti as Claudia Donovan
- Genelle Williams as Leena (Note: Only credited for the episodes she appears in and is also credited in the special appearance bill in three episodes.)
- Aaron Ashmore as Steve Jinks (Note: Only credited for the episodes he appears in and also has a starring bill credit in "An Evil Within".)

=== Special guest ===
- Anthony Michael Hall as Walter Sykes
- Brent Spiner as Brother Adrian
- James Marsters as Bennett Sutton / The Count of St. Germain
- Polly Walker as Charlotte Dupres
- Anthony Stewart Head as Paracelsus
- Joel Grey as Monty the Magnificent

=== Recurring ===
- C. C. H. Pounder as Mrs. Irene Frederic (Note: Also has a starring bill credit in "A New Hope.")
- Roger Rees as James MacPherson
- Jaime Murray as Helena G. Wells
- Kate Mulgrew as Jane Lattimer
- Sasha Roiz as Marcus Diamond
- Faran Tahir as Adwin Kosan
- Kelly Hu as Abigail Cho
- Josh Blaylock as Nick Powell

=== Guest ===
- Sam Huntington as Ethan
- Amy Acker as Tracy Bering
- Jeri Ryan as Amanda Lattimer
- René Auberjonois as Hugo Miller
- Lester Holt as himself
- Ed Schultz as himself
- Laura Innes as Emma Jinks
- Brian J. Smith as Jesse Ashton
- Dee Wallace as Mrs. Garner
- Lindsay Wagner as Vanessa Calder
- Mike Dopud as Mike Madden
- Kirsten Nelson as Judy Giltoy
- Timothy Omundson as Larry Kemp
- Danielle Nicolet as Deb Stanley
- Pooch Hall as Cody Bell
- Thomas Roberts as himself
- Emily Bergl as Autumn Radnor
- Patrick John Flueger as Park Ranger Evan Smith
- Missi Pyle as Lily Abbott
- America Olivo as Rebecca Carson
- Enrico Colantoni as Anthony Bishop
- Steve Valentine as Val
- Todd Stashwick as DA Holgren
- Tuc Watkins as Nate
- Ricardo Chavira as Detective Briggs
- Charlie Weber as Liam Napier
- Cynthia Watros as Janice Malloy
- Walker Boone as Doctor Selden

=== Special appearance ===
- Cherie Currie as herself

== Production ==
On August 11, 2011, it was announced that Warehouse 13 was renewed for a fourth season of thirteen episodes to air in 2012. On January 13, 2012, Syfy extended the order by seven episodes, bringing the total to twenty episodes. On May 15, 2012, Allison Scagliotti announced on Twitter that Season 4 will debut on July 23, 2012. Brent Spiner and Sam Huntington are set to join season four as guest stars, with Spiner to play Brother Adrian, leader of an intensely secretive sect; and Huntington as Ethan, a jazz musician. Aaron Ashmore was upgraded to a series regular in episode three "Personal Effects". For the second half of the season, Polly Walker will appear in several episodes as Charlotte Dupres. In April 2013, it was announced that Anthony Head had been cast as a villain named Paracelsus, and would appear in the final three episodes of the fourth season.

== Episodes ==
No. overall	No. in season	Title	Directed by	Written by	Original release date	US viewers (millions)
Part 1
40	1	"A New Hope"	Chris Fisher	Jack Kenny	July 23, 2012	2.14
The Warehouse team struggles with the horrible reality of the Warehouse's destruction and the tragic loss of Steve Jinks, Mrs. Frederic, and H. G. Wells. With matters so desperate, Pete, Myka, Artie, Leena, and Claudia must decide whether to knowingly use a dangerous artifact for their gain - at the risk of deadly consequences. They encounter the mysterious Brotherhood of the Black Diamond while traveling to the small village of Richerenches, France. In the end, Artie uses Ferdinand Magellan's Astrolabe to reverse time by 24 hours to just a few minutes before the Warehouse was destroyed. Using Ganhdi's Dhoti to imbue Sykes with pure peace, Artie is able to stop the bomb and save the warehouse with Sykes hitting his head on the floor and dying in the process. H. G. and Mrs. Fredric are restored and Artie successfully argues for H. G. to be pardoned. However, he is haunted by the warning of Brother Adrian, that using the astrolabe will unleash an undying evil of Artie's own making. Artie then suffers a nightmare of running from Claudia who stabs him with a dagger. Artifacts: Pandora's box/Pithos, Artifact Tracker Football, Ferdinand Magellan's Astrolabe, Mahatma Gandhi's Dhoti, House of Commons Masonry, Duarte Barbosa's Pocket Watch
41	2	"An Evil Within"	Constantine Makris	Holly Harold	July 30, 2012	1.67
Pete and Myka are sent to Philadelphia to find an artifact that is the cause of strange hallucinations - people fear monsters, but only humans are killed when attacked. Artie is searching for more information on what evil he unleashed. Claudia tempts fate as she tries to bring Steve back with the help of someone unexpected. Artifacts: HP Lovecraft's Silver Key, Johann Maelzel's Metronome
42	3	"Personal Effects"	Andrew Seklir	Ian Stokes	August 6, 2012	1.63
Pete and Myka need the rest of the team's assistance as they try to hunt down the rest of the artifacts in Walter Sykes' arsenal. They find everything they are looking for, but complications arise within the team; Steve discovers a side-effect to the metronome - anything that inflicts pain on him, Claudia will feel. Artie, under the influence of Bobby Jones' Golf Clubs, accidentally mentions, in not so many words, that he saved the world, but that no one will ever know, which worries Leena, as his rage is something she has never seen before. Artifacts: Richard E. Byrd's Smoking Pipe, Boa Vista Plantation Token, Catherine O'Leary's Cow Bell, Napoleon Bonaparte's Violin, John A. Macready's Original Pair of Ray-Bans, Bobby Jones' Golf Clubs, Bird Cage, Maurice Vermersch's Waffle Iron
43	4	"There's Always a Downside"	Constantine Makris	Drew Z. Greenberg	August 13, 2012	1.56
Pete and Claudia reunite with Hugo to find different pieces of an artifact that is affecting Hugo's nephew and his classmates. Myka and Steve investigate a case where an artifact is slowly killing a jazz player, and he knows exactly what it is. In the meantime, Artie and Brother Adrian have a confrontation about the astrolabe, which reveals that Brother Adrian knows Artie has used it. After an incident with the artifact they were sent to retrieve, Steve shows Myka the effects of the metronome and how it affects Claudia. Artifacts: Scott Joplin's Cigarette Case, Bobby Fischer's Bag of Marbles, Robot Matchbox, John Riley "Jack" Duncan's Spur
44	5	"No Pain, No Gain"	Jay Chandrasekhar	Nell Scovell	August 20, 2012	1.87
Pete and Myka are sent to retrieve World War II dog tags from a woman who uses them to wish away a hockey player's injuries so he might have a successful season. The drawback: while near them, Pete wishes Myka to be nine-months pregnant, and it happens. Meanwhile, Artie and Jinks attempt to prevent The Brotherhood from stealing artifacts from the warehouse, artifacts that had once been collected by Artie himself - Brother Adrian's way of "undoing Artie's life work." Steve reveals to Artie the effects of the metronome and his connection to Claudia. However, after finding the stolen artifacts, they realize that not all of the artifacts stolen are still there. Mrs. Frederic tutors Claudia about the warehouse and its artifacts - how they are created and that not all of them may be dangerous. Finally, Mrs. Frederic visits her elderly grandson in a nursing home. Artifacts: Pinwheel, Emperor Jimmu's Feather, Bracelet, Primo Levi's Scarf, Bataan Death March Dogtags, Hatfield and McCoy Rifles
45	6	"Fractures"	Chris Fisher	Benjamin Raab & Deric A. Hughes	August 27, 2012	1.87
Pete and Myka are sent to discover the cause of a young woman's descent into madness; they eventually find Lewis Carroll's Mirror has been placed into the world again and been smashed - but not before Alice jumped into the body of the woman they encountered in the hospital. Racing to find her, the agents discover she is holding a shard of the mirror to body-jump and that she could be anyone. Artie and Dr. Vanessa go on a date, but the evening is cut short upon hearing the news of Alice's escape and her need for revenge on Artie. Claudia discovers the down-side to her involvement in using Johann Maelzel's Metronome to bring Steve back. Artie decides to end his relationship with Dr. Vanessa, but she tells him she will wait for him. At the Warehouse, Artie rants angrily in the Dark Vault to the Brotherhood, whom he thinks are watching. Unknown to him, it was Leena who heard him. Artifacts: Lewis Carroll's Mirror, Abul-Fath Gilani's Hookah, Shard from Lewis Carroll's Mirror, King George III's Crown, Spartacus' Retiarius, Dorothy's Ruby Slippers
46	7	"Endless Wonder"	Michael McMurray	Bob Goodman	September 10, 2012	1.66
Steve and Claudia discover part of Artie's secret and help him track down Brother Adrian to an abandoned house. It turns out the house was a trap, but they manage to escape and recover the artifact. Meanwhile, an influential medical company executive has created a (seemingly) new artifact-related drug with the ability to increase people's height. Myka and Pete must stop it before all the victims stretch to the point of tearing apart. Peter has a one-night stand with Deb Stanley, an executive from the medical company who deduces the artifacts' existence and tells her boss, who in turn pressures a senator and forces the intervention of the Regents. Deb is told the truth, thanks to Pete's good feelings about her, she helps mislead her boss, and she's offered the possibility to become a Regent in the future. In the end, H. G. Wells returns, deduces Artie's secret, and confronts him about it, telling him that she informed Mrs. Frederic. Artifacts: Rod of Asclepius, Bowl forged from the ruins of the Colossus of Rhodes, Invincibility Raincoat, The Threshold of Limentinus, Gold Spike from the Transcontinental Railroad, Harriet Tubman's Thimble, Mary Mallon's Butcher Knife
47	8	"Second Chance"	Constantine Makris	Diego Gutierrez	September 17, 2012	1.32
Pete and Myka are sent to Dalton, West Virginia, when a man begins to rust. The culprit turns out to be a boxer and steelworker, Cody Bell, who has shrapnel from Spartan armor lodged next to his heart from his time serving overseas in the Marines. After saving his father from death, the shrapnel has been activated, leading Cody to inadvertently harm people when he gets angry. Unable to remove the shrapnel from a remorseful Cody without killing him, Myka instead injects the neutralizing gel directly into his system, successfully neutralizing it and stopping the shrapnel's effects; Myka blackmails the local greedy mill owner into reopening the plant, saving the town. At the same time, based on a clue left behind by a previous user of the Metronome, Claudia and Steve visit Steve's home to release him from the Metronome. Steve is revealed to have been estranged from his mother due to a difference of opinion over his sister's murder. The two reconcile and Steve is finally released when he destroys the Metronome in order to save his mother's life, an act of pure love. Artie, Leena, H.G., and Mrs. Frederic work together to find ways to stop Brother Adrian. Mrs. Fredric eventually has H. G take the astrolabe and hide it while Mrs. Fredric attempts to negotiate with the Brotherhood. Artifacts: Spartan Armor Shrapnel, Johann Maelzel's Metronome, Ferdinand Magellan's Astrolabe
48	9	"The Ones You Love"	Howie Deutch	Nell Scovell	September 24, 2012	1.49
The dearest people to Claudia, Pete, and Myka are in danger from artifacts sent to them by Brother Adrian. While they rescue their family, Steve and Mrs. Frederic go to the Vatican. They discover that the brotherhood has a dark secret. They also find Brother Adrian attacking the Warehouse is a figment of Artie's imagination and that he is having a psychotic break. The nature of the evil that Artie has created is revealed as himself - the astrolabe has caused Artie to suffer a mental breakdown that has caused him to hallucinate a malevolent apparition of Brother Adrian that "steals" artifacts and unleashes them on his loved ones. In reality, Artie has been stealing the artifacts and unleashing them while in his Brother Adrian "persona." Leena is killed while trying to help him. Artifacts: Thomas Jeffries' Boomerang, Mehmed II.'s Silken Cord, Ignacy Hryniewiecki's Tattoo Box, Pliny the Elder's Amber Scroll, Rembrandt van Rijn's Painting Frame, D. B. Cooper's Ripcord
49	10	"We All Fall Down"	Chris Fisher	Holly Harold	October 1, 2012	1.62
Mrs. Frederic and Steve are in the Vatican with Brother Adrian, looking for a possibility to free Artie from the effects of the astrolabe. While doing so, they find a precise description of what the Astrolabe is doing to him: It has split Artie's personality, and the dark side of this personality slowly erases the good side. Meanwhile, at the Warehouse, the team finds H. G Wells' research on the dagger from Artie's vision. They find out that Artie wants to use the blade to break the Chinese orchid container, which would release a deadly disease - the English Sweating sickness - into the world. While Pete and Myka go to Prague to retrieve the dagger, Steve and Claudia go to Berlin looking for the orchid. Meanwhile, Mrs. Frederic goes to the Budapest Airport, and she finds the security guards tied up and gagged, and Artie is gone. Artie forestalls Pete and Myka by using Isaac C. Parker's noose and goes after the orchid himself, not in Berlin. The team rushes after Artie to foil his plans and bring him to his senses but fails. Artie releases the orchid, at which point his vision of Claudia stabbing Artie with the dagger comes true. Artifacts: The Chinese Orchid, Isaac C. Parker's noose, Yogiraj Bengali's Snake Basket, Barometer from the USS Eldridge, Supersonic Cymbals, Francesco Borgia's Dagger, Glassblowing Tube
Part 2
50	11	"The Living and the Dead"	Millicent Shelton	Drew Z. Greenberg	April 29, 2013	1.51
Mrs. Frederic, Pete, and Myka look for an artifact that can bring The Chinese Orchid back to life and stop the "sweating sickness" pandemic overtaking the world. They read about the Count of St. Germain who could bring withering flowers back to life. They track down a professor at Columbia University (James Marsters) who is the foremost expert on the Count and enlist his help in recovering the ring from the Catacombs of Paris. Artie has retreated into his mind, not wanting to come out of his coma and face the memory and act of killing Leena, although the dagger has destroyed Artie's Brother Adrian persona. Jane Lattimer uses Sigmund Freud's desk clock to link Claudia and Steve with Artie's subconscious. Inside, they see that his mind is shutting down. Artie uses representations of Dr. Vanessa Calder and James MacPherson to get the pair out of his mind. Claudia eventually rescues Artie and brings him back from his catatonic state. The professor turns out to be the Count himself, now 519 years old. As Pete and Myka grab the ring from the tomb, the Count steals a diamond, triggering booby traps set by Marie Antoinette. A poison dart supposedly stabs the Count and kills him. Pete and Myka put the ring on the dead orchid, bring it back to life, and thus stopping the sweating sickness. Back in the tomb Charlotte Dupres claims that the professor is her husband of many centuries and realizes that the entire 'poison dart death scene' was a fake, one of many she ascribes to the Count, whom she seems to know very well. Artifacts: The Chinese Orchid, most giant diamond from Marie Antoinette's infamous necklace, Count of St. Germain's ring, Sigmund Freud's desk clock Note: Despite the original air date of this episode being April 29, 2013, the episode was available as a "sneak peek" to users of Time Warner Cable's "On Demand" service and on Syfy.com from April 16, 2013.
51	12	"Parks and Rehabilitation"	Larry Teng	Ian Stokes	May 6, 2013	1.28
The Regents forgive Artie and give him Leena's video statement. Pete and Claudia travel to Cowan National Forest where a well-dressed businessman has been buried vertically in the forest. Meanwhile, back at the Warehouse, Myka and Steve are trying to keep an eye on Artie trying to work his way through a list of Leena's duties, including placing new artifacts. Artifacts: Norge's Porthole, Soccer Ball, Remote Control Car, Da Vinci's Gargoyle, Courrières Mine Miner's Lantern
52	13	"The Big Snag"	Chris Fisher	John-Paul Nickel	May 13, 2013	1.27
In a partly black and white episode, Pete and Myka are trapped in an unfinished 1940's hard-boiled detective novel and find more than they bargained for. Meanwhile, Steve, Claudia, and Artie search for a thief stealing classic cars from locked rooms - by driving them through solid walls. Artifacts: Vyasa's Elephant, Anthony Bishop's Manuscript, Carey Loftin's Gloves
53	14	"The Sky's the Limit"	Jack Kenny	Michael Jones-Morales	May 20, 2013	1.08
Mrs. Fredric introduces Artie to the new B&B Manager, Abigail, a former psychotherapist who helps Artie deal with his grief over killing Leena. Pete and Myka head to Las Vegas to check out glowing orange bodies falling from the sky and get caught in a feud between two show magicians. Meanwhile Claudia and Steve are on their way to London to investigate a few long-shot horses putting their jockeys into comas after one in a million wins. While there, Claudia encounters Charlotte Dupres, who appears to have her own agenda. Artifacts: King Kamehameha's Hawaiian Lei, Julia Child's Apron, the Original Ginsu Knife, St. Joseph of Cupertino's Medal, Pancho Villa's Boots, Sitting Bull's Riding Blanket, Harry Blackstone, Sr.'s Light Bulb
54	15	"Instinct"	Jennifer Lynch	Bob Goodman	June 3, 2013	1.36
Pete and Myka reunite with H. G. Wells when she calls them for help in finding an artifact the likes of which even she has never seen. While Pete and Myka are busy, Artie, Abigail, Claudia, and Steve try to find out what is causing the warehouse to have tremors, but taking care of the problem will be impossible until Claudia can understand why the warehouse keeps zapping her. Artifacts: Spike from the Transcontinental Railway, Roy Fransen's Diving Platform, Pachycrocuta Jawbone, Frequency Interfering Surveillance Holograph (FISH), Goozooka
55	16	"Runaway"	Matthew Hastings	Ian D. Maddox & Marque Franklin	June 10, 2013	1.66
Pete, Myka, and Steve head to the scene of a recent prison break where they discover the outer wall was melted clean through by what appears to be molten lava. Steve also finds that the US Marshal who is involved with this case is his ex. Meanwhile, Artie's plan to throw the best 21st birthday party ever for Claudia suffers a setback when he goes deaf. Artifacts: Jerry Garcia's Black Light, Beethoven's Clock (bifurcated Artifact), Original Bouncing Ball, Pompeii Amphora
56	17	"What Matters Most"	Chris Fisher	Diego Gutierrez	June 17, 2013	1.36
After a DA dies in his driveway, Pete and Myka must figure out what's going on at a high-class and expensive gated community where residents are being affected by a mysterious versatile supernatural artifact. Meanwhile, Artie and Claudia team up to investigate a possible artifact after Nick (Josh Blaylock), a homeless 15-year-old boy, suddenly has moments when he becomes a mathematical genius followed by having dangerous, life-threatening seizures. Steve and Abigail get messy trying to fix the Warehouse's internal plumbing, a situation that Steve uses to get some free therapy from Abigail. Myka receives some devastating news during the team's annual medicals. Artifacts: Goo Storage System, Joseph Stalin's Sleepmask, Orville Wright's Aviator Goggles, Sodom and Gomorrah Salt Mask
57	18	"Lost & Found"	Howie Deutch	Benjamin Raab & Deric A. Hughes	June 24, 2013	1.11
Artie, Myka, and Pete travel to Buffalo searching for stolen artifacts belonging to Warehouse 12. En route, they encounter Charlotte Dupres, who is in search of the same thing. Teaming up, they hunt for the missing treasure, only to be attacked by a mysterious smoke monster, which kills Charlotte and tries to kill Artie, Pete, and Myka, too, leading Charlotte to unveil the truth. In South Dakota, Claudia tries to help Nick adjust to everyday life, but things aren't quite as they seem. Steve is overwhelmed with paperwork but begins to suspect Nick when it becomes clear he lies about everything. Claudia and Steve finally discover the real reason behind Nick's strange behavior, but not before Claudia inadvertently helps him unbronze an evil alchemist and ends up bronzed herself. Meanwhile, Myka struggles to admit the truth about her illness to Pete. Artifacts: Dan Seavey's Puzzle Box, Auguste Rodin's Sculpting Tools, Aleister Crowley's Hexagram Amulet, 1937 New Year's Eve Noise Makers, Franz Mesmer's Magnets, Magnum Opus Philosopher's Stone, Warehouse 12 Artifact collection
58	19	"All the Time in the World"	Chris Fisher	Holly Harold	July 1, 2013	1.42
Pete, Myka, and Charlotte head to Luxembourg on the trail of Paracelsus and Nick, who have stolen the artifact which operates Warehouse 13's Bronzer so that they can debronze Claudia. While there, they encounter Charlotte's husband, the Count of St. Germain. They finally catch up with Paracelsus in Istanbul, but his evil plan means disaster for Charlotte, and he escapes. Meanwhile, Steve, Artie, and Mrs. Frederic try to work out what is going wrong at the Warehouse before Claudia crumbles to pieces. Unfortunately for Artie and Steve, the problem also seems to affect Mrs. Frederic too. Artifacts: Mesopotamian Bronze Stele, Folsom State Prison Ball and Chain, Barry Seal's Aircraft Radio, Binnacle from USS Squalus
59	20	"The Truth Hurts"	Jack Kenny	Drew Z. Greenberg	July 8, 2013	1.42
The team continues their attempt to capture Paracelsus. The Count attempts to bond with his son, Nick, following Charlotte's death, leading to him risking his own life. Myka and Pete head to San Francisco on the trail of Paracelsus. They discover he has cured several cancer patients, putting Myka in a difficult position regarding her illness. However, it turns out to be a double bluff, and they arrive too late to stop him from achieving immortality. Myka faces surgery after developing pains from the spread of her cancer. Steve learns that Artie has been hiding life-changing information from the rest of the team, particularly Claudia, and forces him to reveal the truth. With everything on the line, Claudia makes a risky move to save the Warehouse, but not before Mrs. Frederic has to give up her connection to the Warehouse. Artifacts: John Logie Baird's Scanning Disk, Lillie Hitchcock Coit's Petrified Wood Tower, Egyptian Pharaoh's Copper Bowl, Philosopher's Stone.
