= Univille =

Univille may refer to:

- Universidade da Região de Joinville (Univille), a university in Joinville, Brazil
- Univille /ˈʌnɪvɪl/, South Dakota, the fictional unincorporated town featured in Warehouse 13
