= The Latest Buzz =

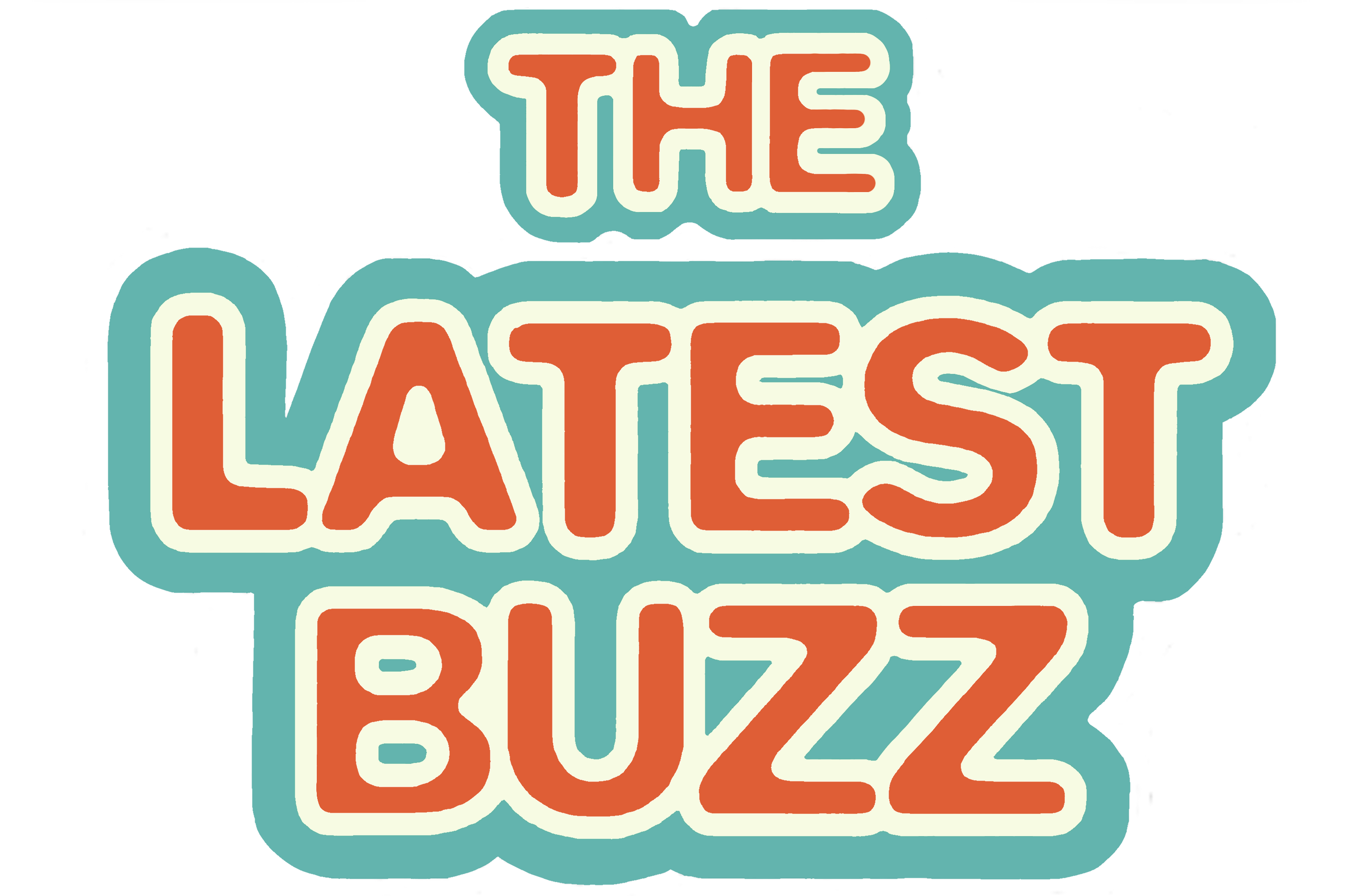
- Genre: Teen situation comedy
- Created by: Brent Piaskoski
- Starring: Zoë Belkin; Munro Chambers; Demetrius Joyette; Vanessa Morgan; Justin Kelly; Genelle Williams; Jeff Geddis
- Opening theme: "The Latest Buzz", performed by Vanessa Morgan
- Composer: Pure West
- Country of origin: Canada
- Original language: English
- No. of seasons: 3
- No. of episodes: 65 (list of episodes)

Production
- Executive producers: Brent Piaskoski; Steven DeNure; Beth Stevenson; Neil Court
- Production locations: Toronto, Canada
- Running time: 23 minutes
- Production company: Decode Entertainment (Note: As Decode/Buzz Productions Inc.)

Original release
- Network: Family Channel
- Release: September 1, 2007 – April 19, 2010

The Latest Buzz is a Canadian teen sitcom produced by Decode Entertainment that aired on Family Channel from September 1, 2007, to April 19, 2010. It was the network's first original multi-camera sitcom.

== Premise ==
The series is about a struggling youth magazine Teen BUZZ. Which replaces its staff with actual teens. Instead of being in class, five young 14 year-old writers take their last period of the day at the magazine's office, learning about the fast-paced world of publishing. The students attend the fictional Ernie Coombs High School, named for the man who played on a children's series Mr. Dressup.

== Characters ==
Main Cast

=== Main characters ===
- Rebecca Harper (Zoë Belkin) – A happy, enthusiastic girl, who sets her seeing high and has big dreams, such as winning the Pulitzer Prize, Rebecca writes the Student Issues column, also known as 'In So Many Words'. She is the only one out of all her five co-writers that really gone to become a journalist. Her peers sometimes call her a nerd for being very efficient at things. She has a crush on her fellow Teen Buzz journalist Noah, and later on in the show they become a couple. Although she really likes Noah, she kisses Elliot on top of the Eiffel Tower under a full moon in Paris during the summer. When they all come back to school ("The Back To School Issue") she accidentally gushes this out to Noah because she thinks that he's trying to tell her that he kissed Zuzu Moon. Instead, Noah breaks up with her but a few episodes later they get back together when they see what their lives would be without each other. She is best friends with Michael but becomes better friends with Amanda. Her catchphrase is "Oh, dear." Rebecca lost her mother when she was younger. She loves baseball, goes to the batting cages whenever she feels bad, and is a fan of baseball MVP Justin Morneau. She used to be a Zuzu Moon fan before the drama between her, Noah, and Zuzu started.
- Wilder Gulliver Atticus Wilder (Munro Chambers) – A gamer with obsession and willing to try anything, Wilder covers Gaming. His column in the magazine is 'Game On'. As good-natured as they come, Wilder is completely stupid about everything except sports and gaming. Only in one episode does Wilder not win or be completely focused during a game, because Amanda tried to flirt with him, making him lose paying attention. Wilder has a crush on Amanda and he gives her a coupon for her first kiss with him. He also has a speech to give her and a binder with photos of her. He is very overprotected causing his catchphrase which is "Awestruck!" which appeared when he first saw Amanda. Although Michael desperately tries to find out, Amanda is the only one of the writers who knows Wilder's full name (until it's revealed in a season 3 episode Meet the Wilders by his sister, Roxie to be Wilder Wilder). He is a great cook and when he teaches Amanda to cook he destroys her meal by putting booms in it but later thinks better and jumps in front of the cake for her. He also has an adopted Chinese baby sister named Chu-Hui, appeared in season 3, and another sister, Roxie, who appears in the second to last episode, Meet the Wilders. He and Amanda become a couple in "The Hip-Hop Issue" and end the series a couple. They kiss in the final episode, which is Amanda's first.
- Michael Theodore Davies (Demetrius Joyette) – A quirky writer capable of reporting on big stories, Michael writes the Gossip column (also known as 'Name Dropping'). Michael is hip and always has so much to say about everything. He always has his camera with him, and is constantly trying to find out some celebrity news. A fabulous dresser with a healthy self-image, Michael is best friends with Rebecca, but gradually becomes better friends with both Noah and Wilder, and is also best friends with Amanda due to their love of fashion. He is the first one to know about Noah's crush on Rebecca. He usually says his actions instead of actually doing them, such as "Gasp!" or "Gag!" In the third season, Michael dates Amanda for one episode. He later dates, breaks up with, and still has feelings for Yolanda. He is a fan of the musical 'Good Witch Bad Witch' (a parody of Wicked) and can be seen frequently singing "Which witch should I be? Which witch is really me?", two lines from a song from the musical.
- Noah Brent Jackson (Justin Kelly) – A sarcastic joker who frequently makes fun of others, Noah is considered the playful misfit, the boy can't help but want to be around. The only difference is at work, his fellow writers can't afford to just dismiss him. Noah covers Music. and his column is 'Ear to the Ground'. He is the middle child and has a younger sister named Carly (who is 6 years old). Noah is in love with Rebecca, though he works hard at denying it. Before long Noah does admit his crush to Rebecca and they end up becoming a couple, although they break up at one point but get back together again. His nickname for her is R. He is funny and can always be counted on for a clever or sarcastic remark. He is also best friends with Wilder.
- Amanda Pierce (Vanessa Morgan) – The magazine owner's daughter, Amanda covers Fashion. The "daddy's little rich girl", she is the fashion girl. Amanda gets everything she wants and lives a charmed life, but is very intelligent and has the academic grades to prove it. She has a crush on Wilder. She and Rebecca argue, but are best friends. Amanda's column is 'Fashion Forward'. She and Wilder have chemistry, despite being major opposites. She gets a coupon for her first kiss from Wilder. She dates Michael in one episode. Many boys have a crush on her, but she is only interested in Wilder, even though she breaks his heart in "The Summer Bash Issue". In "The Hip-Hop Issue" she brings a prince named Chase as her date to the dance, who looks exactly like Wilder (he is played by Thomas Chambers, Munro Chambers' identical twin brother). Wilder and Chase argue over her in a dance-off, and though Chase wins, Amanda chooses Wilder because she says he has always "treated her like a princess." Whenever she has a problem she calls her father's assistant whose name she doesn't even know. She only wears Figarucci clothes. Her favorite singer is Sherrie Overwood (a parody of Carrie Underwood) and she dreams of becoming a singer. Her and Wilder become a couple in "The Hip-Hop Issue" and end the series a couple. They kiss in the finale, which is Amanda's first.
- Mr. Andrew Shepherd (Jeff Geddis) – Mr. Shepherd is the school media studies teacher, whose class all of the Teen Buzz writers attend. His fancy lunches (which he eats at his desk) are constantly interrupted by the writers seeking his advice. He went to high school with DJ. He has feelings for DJ. According to DJ, he always wins. They later get engaged, but in the last episode he breaks up with her, but then he, the journos, and Amanda's father conjure a wedding and they get married in the Buzz office.
- Dianne "DJ" Jeffries (Genelle Williams) – DJ is the editor of Teen Buzz magazine. Although she is beautiful, she is very unfortunate when it comes to love as often seen on being on the cellphone with her judgmental mother. DJ has also had feelings for Andrew and later DJ and Shepherd become a couple, get engaged and later married at the last episode.

=== Recurring characters ===
- Zuzu Moon is a singer who likes Noah. She invites him to go on her summer tour with her, to which he agreed. She kicks him off the tour when he refused to kiss her. There is also drama between her and Rebecca about Noah. But at the end, they became friends. Zuzu is played by Tajja Isen.
- Cody Herman is the former television writer who was always mean and selfish.
- Big Wilder is Wilder's father, who is essentially a grown-up version of Wilder.
- Mr. Harper is Rebecca's father, who is very different from Rebecca, but loves her deeply.
- Yolanda Farquar is a geeky but sweet girl who likes Michael and always seem to call him both his first and last name. Yolanda is played by Raquel Cadilha.
- Mrs. Pierce is Amanda's stepmother who learns to promise with Amanda.
- Mr. Pierce is Amanda's father. He owns the magazine and is always busy. He even faked a recording contract once in order to "keep her close" feeling she doesn't need him anymore.
- Mr. Jackson is Noah's father who is very busy which makes Noah upset.
- Bossman is the boss of the Buzz head office and always has good news/bad news to deliver.
- Daddy's Assistant is Mr. Pierce's assistant. Amanda has been seen talking to him on the phone, usually asking him to do something. He appears in person in the final episode.

== Episodes ==
	# of Episodes	First airdate	Last airdate
Season 1	13	September 1, 2007	December 15, 2007
Season 2	26	September 5, 2008	April 6, 2009
Season 3	26	April 20, 2009	April 19, 2010

== Production ==
As part of Spring Break-Out events, The Latest Buzz cast, Family and Cineplex Entertainment hosted a launch party for the show. From March 13 until April 2, The Latest Buzz cast visited Ottawa, Queensway, Oakville, Vancouver, Edmonton, and Winnipeg Cineplex theatres. Interviews featuring the cast of The Latest Buzz have been featured frequently on Family.

=== Unaired pilot ===
The original pilot, Glimmer, had an older, completely different cast and no laugh track, before being retooled for younger audiences. It starred Shenae Grimes as Rebecca, Will Seatle Bowes as Michael, Lauren Mac as Amanda and Jacob Kraemer as Noah.

== Home media ==
A best-of compilation DVD was released on May 11, 2010, by VSC in Canada.

== International broadcast ==
Country	Network	Series premiere	Title in country
Canada (in English)	Family	September 1, 2007	The Latest Buzz
United Kingdom	Boomerang; Pop Girl	October 9, 2007	The Latest Buzz
United States	Family Room HD (channel discontinued January 2009); Starz Kids & Family	during 2007 (Family Room HD); March 1, 2011 (Starz Kids & Family)	The Latest Buzz
Australia	Nickelodeon (Australia); ABC1	mid or late 2007	The Latest Buzz
Italy	Disney Channel (Italy); Rai 2	November 12, 2007	The Latest Buzz
Arab World	MBC 3	February, 2008	The Latest Buzz
Latin America: Argentina; Chile; Colombia; Costa Rica; Dominican Republic; Guatemala; Honduras; Mexico; Peru; Venezuela	Boomerang (Latin America)	February 9, 2008	La última onda
Brazil	Boomerang (Latin America)	February 9, 2008	Zoação Teen
India	Disney Channel (India)	February 11, 2008	The Latest Buzz
Bangladesh	Disney Channel (India)	February 11, 2008	The Latest Buzz
Pakistan	Disney Channel (India)	February 11, 2008	The Latest Buzz
Singapore	okto	April, 2008	Buzz Terkini
Canada (in French)	VRAK.TV	May 31, 2008	Buzz Mag
Israel	Arutz HaYeladim	July 13, 2008	הבאזזז
Germany	Cartoon Network (Germany); Super RTL; Yfe; Fix & Foxi	September 1, 2008	Teen Buzz
Poland	Cartoon Network (Poland)	September 1, 2008	Najnowsze wydanie
Hungary	Cartoon Network CEE	September 1, 2008	Aktuális csízió
Romania	Cartoon Network CEE	September 1, 2008	Ultima bârfă
Denmark	Cartoon Network (Nordic)	September 1, 2008	Den nyeste sladder
Sweden	Cartoon Network (Nordic)	September 1, 2008	unknown
Norway	Cartoon Network (Nordic)	September 1, 2008	Siste sladder
Portugal	Nickelodeon (Portugal)	September, 2008	As últimas novidades
Ireland (in English)	RTÉ Two; TRTÉ	September, 2008	The Latest Buzz
France	Disney Channel (France)	December 14, 2008	Buzz Mag
Hong Kong	ATV World	December 14, 2008	最新留言
Spain	Nickelodeon (Spain)	March 9, 2009	Noticias frescas
Ireland (in Irish)	TG4	June, 2009	An Buzz is déanaí
Austria	ORF 1	September 12, 2010	Teen Buzz
Greece	ET1 (Greece)	March 4, 2011	ΤΕΛΕΥΤΑΙΑ ΕΚΔΟΣΗ
