= Genelle Williams =

Canadian actress (born 1984)

- Born: February 18, 1984 (age 42); Toronto, Ontario, Canada
- Occupation: Actress
- Years active: 2003–present
- Known for: Radio Free Roscoe; The Latest Buzz; Warehouse 13; Family Law

Genelle Williams (born February 18, 1984) is a Canadian actress who is best known for her roles as Kim Carlisle in Radio Free Roscoe, as DJ in The Latest Buzz, and as the innkeeper Leena in Warehouse 13.

== Career ==
Acting in high school led to the beginning of Williams's professional career when a teacher saw her perform in a musical and recommended an agent to Williams.

Williams's first notable role was on Family's Radio Free Roscoe, which aired between 2002 and 2004. In 2003, she played Kim Carlisle, a DJ for "Cougar Radio", and love interest of Robert McGrath. Over three years, she also played multiple roles on the popular CTV series Degrassi: The Next Generation.

After taking a break in her career, she appeared in Family’s new show, The Latest Buzz, as Diane Jeffreys (abbreviated "DJ"), the editor and supervisor of the young writers of Teen Buzz. She then portrayed Leena on the Syfy series Warehouse 13 from the series's start in July 2009 until the midpoint of season four in October 2012. In 2014, Williams appeared in Lifetime's The Lottery. Williams had recurring roles on Remedy and Bitten. She appeared in Family Law as Lucy Svensson from 2021 to 2026.

Williams' film work includes It's a Boy Girl Thing, The Incredible Hulk, and Orphan.

== Filmography ==
=== Film ===
| Year | Title | Role | Notes |
|---|---|---|---|
| 2004 | My Baby's Daddy | Receptionist (uncredited) | |
| 2004 | The Lazarus Child | Young Lizzie | |
| 2006 | It's a Boy Girl Thing | Tiffany | |
| 2008 | The Incredible Hulk | Terrified Girl | |
| 2008 | Mookie's Law | Dahlia | Short film |
| 2008 | Saving God | Ashley Ellis | |
| 2009 | Orphan | Sister Judith | |
| 2010 | Running Boy | Sabine | Short film |
| 2016 | 77 Days | Jenn | Short film |
| 2017 | Animal | Maeve | Short film |
| 2018 | Clara | Maya | |
| 2018 | The Holiday Calendar | Sarah Sutton | |
| 2019 | American Hangman | Barbara | |
| 2021 | Spiral: From the Book of Saw | Lisa Banks | |
| 2022 | Delia's Gone | Delia | |

=== Television ===
| Year | Title | Role | Notes |
|---|---|---|---|
| 2003 | Eloise at the Plaza | Debutante Ruth | TV movie |
| 2003 | Wild Card | Sorority Pledge | Episode: "Hell Week" |
| 2003–2005 | Radio Free Roscoe | Kim Carlisle | 18 episodes |
| 2004 | This Is Wonderland | Kiana Lewis | Episode #1.11 |
| 2005 | More Sex & the Single Mom | Megan | TV movie |
| 2005 | Sue Thomas: F.B. Eye | Candy McNeil | Episode: "Secret Agent Man" |
| 2005 | Kevin Hill | Alyssa | Episode: "The Monroe Doctrine" |
| 2005, 2007 | Degrassi: The Next Generation | Mia / Carla Carlisle | 3 episodes |
| 2006 | Doomstown | Monica | TV movie |
| 2006 | Banshee | Brenna | TV movie |
| 2007 | Lovebites | Marissa | 3 episodes |
| 2007 | Super Why! | Additional voice | Episode: "The Princess and the Pea" |
| 2007 | The Note | Mandi | TV movie |
| 2007–2010 | The Latest Buzz | Dianne "DJ" Jeffries | 67 episodes |
| 2008 | The Tower | Sonia Taylor | TV movie |
| 2009 | The Line | Michelle | 8 episodes |
| 2009 | Taking a Chance on Love | Mandi | TV movie |
| 2009 | Flashpoint | Taraleigh | Episode: "Aisle 13" |
| 2009–2014 | Warehouse 13 | Leena | 52 episodes |
| 2011 | The Listener | Magda | Episode: "To Die For" |
| 2012 | Warehouse 13: Of Monsters and Men | Leena | Web series; 8 episodes |
| 2012 | Lost Girl | Hessa | Episode: "Table for Fae" |
| 2013 | Republic of Doyle | Colleen Simms | Episode: "Multitasking" |
| 2014 | The Lottery | Kyle's friend | Episodes: "Rules of the Game" & "Greater Good" |
| 2014 | An En Vogue Christmas | Kendall | TV Movie |
| 2014–2015 | Remedy | Zoe Rivera | 20 episodes |
| 2014–2016 | Bitten | Rachel | 20 episodes |
| 2015 | Saving Hope | Shelby Hart | 2 episodes |
| 2016 | Rogue | Nika | Episode: "How to Treat Us" |
| 2017 | Private Eyes | Mary Sinclair | Episode: "The Frame Job" |
| 2017 | Dark Matter | Lara, Wife of Kal Varrik (Six) | Episode: "Wish I Could Believe You" |
| 2018 | Second Opinion | Skyler Parsons | TV movie |
| 2018 | In Contempt | Alison | 4 episodes |
| 2018 | The Expanse | Tilly Fagan | 5 episodes |
| 2018 | Christmas Catch | Special Agent Robertson | TV movie |
| 2018 | Northern Lights of Christmas | Karen Yazzi | TV movie |
| 2019 | Cardinal | Laura Carnwright | 3 episodes |
| 2019 | Coroner | Camilla Brent / Camilla Brinks | Episode: "The Suburbs" |
| 2019 | Magical Christmas Shoes | Allison | TV movie |
| 2019 | Turkey Drop | Anna | TV movie |
| 2020 | Utopia Falls | Anna 12 | Episode: "If I Ruled the World" |
| 2020 | Schitt's Creek | Penelope | Episode: "Sunrise, Sunset" |
| 2021 | Clarice | Jesse Powell | Episode: "Add-a-Bead" |
| 2021–2026 | Family Law | Lucy Svensson | 40 episodes |
| 2022 | The Perfect Pairing | Diane | TV movie |
| 2022 | Christmas on Mistletoe Lake | Reilly | TV movie |
