= The Bay of Love and Sorrows =

- Directed by: Tim Southam
- Written by: David Adams Richards; Tim Southam
- Produced by: Anna Stratton; Gilles Bélanger
- Starring: Peter Outerbridge; Jonathan Scarfe; Joanne Kelly
- Cinematography: Éric Cayla
- Edited by: Wiebke von Carolsfeld
- Music by: Gaëtan Gravel; Serge LaForest
- Production company: Triptych Media
- Distributed by: Odeon Films
- Release date: 2002
- Running time: 94 minutes
- Country: Canada
- Language: English

The Bay of Love and Sorrows is a 1998 novel by David Adams Richards.

== Background ==
Like many of Richards's books, The Bay of Love and Sorrows is set during the 1970s; the book was in part inspired by his experiences growing up then in New Brunswick. Richards told the Edmonton Journal that the book was about "how children get manipulated, often by other children... how easy it is to be manipulated as a child."

The first printing of the novel sold out before it was released.

== Plot ==
Set in rural New Brunswick, Canada in 1974, the novel follows protagonist Michael Skid, the privileged son of the town judge. After a falling out with his friend Tom Donnerel, Michael befriends Madonna and Silver Brassaurd, a brother and sister who draw him into the orbit of Everette Hutch, a charismatic and violent man who ultimately leads the three youths to commit murder.

== Critical reception ==
The Bay of Love and Sorrows received mixed reviews. The Globe and Mail praised the novel, writing: "Like the best of Richards's works... [the book is] dark in tone, both harshly realistic and lyrically sympathetic to the most disadvantaged members of society." The book was also reviewed favorably by the Calgary Herald, which called it "grim but beautiful," the New Brunswick Telegraph Journal, and the Toronto Star.

The Ottawa Citizen was more mixed, criticizing the book's "banal characterizations, awkward sentences, obvious symbols and tidy plot" but suggesting it might work well as a film adaptation. Kirkus Reviews was also negative, writing that the novel "strains both credibility and the reader’s ability to keep a straight face with this pullulating melodrama."

== Adaptations ==
The novel was adapted into a 2002 film starring Peter Outerbridge as Everette Hutch, Jonathan Scarfe as Michael Skid, Joanne Kelly as Madonna Brassaurd, Christopher Jacot as Silver Brassaurd, Torquil Campbell as Vincent Donnerel and Elaine Cassidy as Carrie Matchett.
