= List of Warehouse 13 episodes =

Warehouse 13 is a supernatural fantasy television series created by Jane Espenson and D. Brent Mote. The show premiered on Syfy on July 7, 2009.

The series follows United States Secret Service Agents Myka Bering (Joanne Kelly) and Peter Lattimer (Eddie McClintock) when they are assigned to the government's secret Warehouse 13, which houses supernatural "artifacts". It is located in a barren landscape in South Dakota, and they initially regard the assignment as punishment. As they go about their assignments to retrieve missing Warehouse 13 artifacts and investigate reports of new ones, they come to understand the importance of what they are doing. During the course of the series, 65 episodes of Warehouse 13 aired over five seasons.

== Series overview ==
Season	Episodes		Originally released	
Season	Episodes		First released	Last released
1	13		July 7, 2009	September 22, 2009
2	13		July 6, 2010	December 7, 2010
3	13		July 11, 2011	December 6, 2011
4	20	10	July 23, 2012	October 1, 2012
4	20	10	April 29, 2013	July 8, 2013
5	6		April 14, 2014	May 19, 2014

== Episodes ==
=== Season 1 (2009) ===
No. overall	No. in season	Title	Directed by	Written by	Original release date	US viewers (millions)
1–2	1–2	"Pilot"	Jace Alexander	Story by : Brent Mote & Jane Espenson; Teleplay by : Brent Mote & Jane Espenson & David Simkins	July 7, 2009	3.51
3	3	"Resonance"	Vincent Misiano	David Simkins	July 14, 2009	3.47
4	4	"Magnetism"	Jace Alexander	Jack Kenny	July 21, 2009	2.87
5	5	"Claudia"	Stephen Surjik	Drew Z. Greenberg	July 28, 2009	3.30
6	6	"Elements"	Ken Girotti	Story by : Dana Baratta & Jack Kenny; Teleplay by : Jack Kenny & David Simkins	August 4, 2009	3.31
7	7	"Burnout"	Constantine Makris	Matthew Federman & Stephen Scaia	August 11, 2009	3.35
8	8	"Implosion"	Vincent Misiano	Bob Goodman	August 18, 2009	3.27
9	9	"Duped"	Michael W. Watkins	Ben Raab & Deric A. Hughes	August 25, 2009	2.86
10	10	"Regrets"	Michael W. Watkins	Tamara Becher	September 1, 2009	2.93
11	11	"Breakdown"	Eric Laneuville	Michael P. Fox & Ian Stokes	September 8, 2009	2.70
12	12	"Nevermore"	Tawnia McKiernan	David Simkins	September 15, 2009	2.93
13	13	"MacPherson"	Stephen Surjik	Jack Kenny	September 22, 2009	2.23

=== Season 2 (2010) ===
No. overall	No. in season	Title	Directed by	Written by	Original release date	US viewers (millions)
14	1	"Time Will Tell"	Stephen Surjik	Jack Kenny	July 6, 2010	2.96
15	2	"Mild Mannered"	Constantine Makris	Benjamin Raab & Deric A. Hughes	July 13, 2010	2.33
16	3	"Beyond Our Control"	Constantine Makris	David Simkins	July 20, 2010	2.28
17	4	"Age Before Beauty"	Tawnia McKiernan	Andrew Kreisberg	July 27, 2010	2.48
18	5	"13.1"	Chris Fisher	Ian Stokes	August 3, 2010	2.74
19	6	"Around the Bend"	Tawnia McKiernan	Bob Goodman	August 10, 2010	2.79
20	7	"For the Team"	Tawnia McKiernan	Drew Z. Greenberg	August 17, 2010	2.34
21	8	"Merge with Caution"	Anton Cropper	Nell Scovell	August 24, 2010	2.36
22	9	"Vendetta"	Matt Earl Beesley	Michael P. Fox	August 31, 2010	2.40
23	10	"Where and When"	Stephen Cragg	Drew Z. Greenberg & Andrew Kreisberg	September 7, 2010	2.49
24	11	"Buried" (Part 1)	Stephen Surjik	Robyn Adams & Mike Johnson	September 14, 2010	2.38
25	12	"Reset" (Part 2)	Constantine Makris	Jack Kenny & Nell Scovell	September 21, 2010	2.40
26	13	"Secret Santa"	Jack Kenny	Bob Goodman	December 7, 2010	2.01

=== Season 3 (2011) ===
No. overall	No. in season	Title	Directed by	Written by	Original release date	US viewers (millions)
27	1	"The New Guy"	Stephen Surjik	Jack Kenny	July 11, 2011	2.34
28	2	"Trials"	Constantine Makris	Drew Z. Greenberg	July 18, 2011	2.46
29	3	"Love Sick"	Tawnia McKiernan	Andrew Kreisberg	July 25, 2011	2.04
30	4	"Queen for a Day"	Jeremiah Chechik	Holly Harold	August 1, 2011	2.25
31	5	"3... 2... 1..."	Chris Fisher	Bob Goodman	August 8, 2011	2.54
32	6	"Don't Hate the Player"	Chris Fisher	Ian Stokes	August 15, 2011	2.42
33	7	"Past Imperfect"	Tawnia McKiernan	Nell Scovell	August 22, 2011	2.25
34	8	"The 40th Floor"	Chris Fisher	Benjamin Raab & Deric A. Hughes	August 29, 2011	2.29
35	9	"Shadows"	Tawnia McKiernan	Bob Goodman & Holly Harold	September 12, 2011	1.91
36	10	"Insatiable"	Constantine Makris	Benjamin Raab & Deric A. Hughes	September 19, 2011	1.83
37	11	"Emily Lake" (Part 1)	Millicent Shelton	Nell Scovell & Ian Stokes	October 3, 2011	1.63
38	12	"Stand" (Part 2)	Stephen Surjik	Andrew Kreisberg & Drew Z. Greenberg	October 3, 2011	1.63
39	13	"The Greatest Gift"	Jack Kenny	Story by : Mike Johnson & John-Paul Nickel; Teleplay by : John-Paul Nickel	December 6, 2011	1.58

=== Season 4 (2012–13) ===
No. overall	No. in season	Title	Directed by	Written by	Original release date	US viewers (millions)
Part 1
40	1	"A New Hope"	Chris Fisher	Jack Kenny	July 23, 2012	2.14
41	2	"An Evil Within"	Constantine Makris	Holly Harold	July 30, 2012	1.67
42	3	"Personal Effects"	Andrew Seklir	Ian Stokes	August 6, 2012	1.63
43	4	"There's Always a Downside"	Constantine Makris	Drew Z. Greenberg	August 13, 2012	1.56
44	5	"No Pain, No Gain"	Jay Chandrasekhar	Nell Scovell	August 20, 2012	1.87
45	6	"Fractures"	Chris Fisher	Benjamin Raab & Deric A. Hughes	August 27, 2012	1.87
46	7	"Endless Wonder"	Michael McMurray	Bob Goodman	September 10, 2012	1.66
47	8	"Second Chance"	Constantine Makris	Diego Gutierrez	September 17, 2012	1.32
48	9	"The Ones You Love"	Howie Deutch	Nell Scovell	September 24, 2012	1.49
49	10	"We All Fall Down"	Chris Fisher	Holly Harold	October 1, 2012	1.62
Part 2
50	11	"The Living and the Dead"	Millicent Shelton	Drew Z. Greenberg	April 29, 2013	1.51
51	12	"Parks and Rehabilitation"	Larry Teng	Ian Stokes	May 6, 2013	1.28
52	13	"The Big Snag"	Chris Fisher	John-Paul Nickel	May 13, 2013	1.27
53	14	"The Sky's the Limit"	Jack Kenny	Michael Jones-Morales	May 20, 2013	1.08
54	15	"Instinct"	Jennifer Lynch	Bob Goodman	June 3, 2013	1.36
55	16	"Runaway"	Matthew Hastings	Ian D. Maddox & Marque Franklin	June 10, 2013	1.66
56	17	"What Matters Most"	Chris Fisher	Diego Gutierrez	June 17, 2013	1.36
57	18	"Lost & Found"	Howie Deutch	Benjamin Raab & Deric A. Hughes	June 24, 2013	1.11
58	19	"All the Time in the World"	Chris Fisher	Holly Harold	July 1, 2013	1.42
59	20	"The Truth Hurts"	Jack Kenny	Drew Z. Greenberg	July 8, 2013	1.42

=== Season 5 (2014) ===
No. overall	No. in season	Title	Directed by	Written by	Original release date	US viewers (millions)
60	1	"Endless Terror"	Jack Kenny	Jack Kenny	April 14, 2014	1.17
61	2	"Secret Service"	Robert Duncan McNeill	Bob Goodman	April 21, 2014	1.15
62	3	"A Faire to Remember"	Matt Birman	Holly Harold	April 28, 2014	1.08
63	4	"Savage Seduction"	Jack Kenny	Diego Gutierrez	May 5, 2014	0.90
64	5	"Cangku Shisi"	Michael McMurray	Benjamin Raab & Deric A. Hughes	May 12, 2014	0.85
65	6	"Endless"	Jack Kenny	John-Paul Nickel	May 19, 2014	1.13

== Webisodes ==
There are two sets of webisodes. These episodes use some graphic art styles, which are a departure from the regular show. The first series, titled Of Monsters and Men, uses a comic book style with ten chapters, including a bonus chapter, while the second series, titled Grand Designs, features a steam-punk theme, which also has ten chapters.

=== Of Monsters and Men (2011) ===
No.	Title	Original release date
1	"Chapter 1"	July 5, 2011
2	"Chapter 2"	July 6, 2011
3	"Chapter 3"	July 7, 2011
4	"Chapter 4"	July 8, 2011
5	"Chapter 5"	July 11, 2011
6	"Chapter 6"	July 12, 2011
7	"Chapter 7"	July 13, 2011
8	"Chapter 8"	July 14, 2011
9	"Chapter 9"	July 15, 2011
10	"Chapter 10"	July 15, 2011
–	"Bonus Chapter"	July 15, 2011

=== Grand Designs (2012) ===
No.	Title	Original release date
1	"Chapter 1"	July 23, 2012
2	"Chapter 2"	July 24, 2012
3	"Chapter 3"	July 25, 2012
4	"Chapter 4"	July 26, 2012
5	"Chapter 5"	July 27, 2012
6	"Chapter 6"	July 30, 2012
7	"Chapter 7"	July 31, 2012
8	"Chapter 8"	August 1, 2012
9	"Chapter 9"	August 2, 2012
10	"Chapter 10"	August 3, 2012
