= Aaron Lohr =

American actor

- Born: April 2, 1976 (age 50)
- Occupation: Actor
- Years active: 1983−present
- Spouse: Idina Menzel (m. 2017)

Aaron Lohr (born April 2, 1976) is a former American actor.

== Early life and education ==
He is a graduate of UCLA, where he majored in theater.

== Film and television career ==
Lohr portrayed the Dancing Boy in Deniece Williams' music video for the song "Let's Hear It for the Boy". He is also in the British television advertisement for Carlsberg Beer. Lohr has also appeared in many Sister, Sister episodes, better known as Marlon in his later appearances in the show.

Lohr became a recognizable player of the Disney Studios stable, appearing in many of their films, including The Mighty Ducks series and Newsies. He provided the singing voice for Max Goof in A Goofy Movie (filling in for Jason Marsden). In 2000, he starred as Micky Dolenz in the VH1 television film Daydream Believers: The Monkees' Story.

He appeared in the 2005 film adaptation of the Tony and Pulitzer Prize winning Broadway musical Rent, directed by Chris Columbus. Lohr played the character Steve and sang vocals for the songs "Will I" and "Life Support" on the first disc of the soundtrack for the film. He starred in various roles in Michael John LaChiusa's See What I Wanna See at the New York Public Theater, opposite actress/singer Idina Menzel. Independent film releases include Henry Bean's Noise, Jim Koya Jones' taut psychological thriller The Wreck, and Manslaughter produced by Jim Koya Jones.

More recent work has included many leading roles in New York theater productions. He performed as Matt in the Off-Broadway production of Bare: A Pop Opera in 2004. He has appeared in several productions at the Public Theater. His inaugural performance there was in George Wolfe's Radiant Baby in 2003. This led to his starring role in See What I Want To See by Michael John LaChiusa. Lohr also starred in the political drama In Darfur both at the NY Public and Delacorte Theater.

Lohr has since retired from acting and currently serves as the Clinical Director at the Avalon Malibu rehab center.

== Personal life ==
In August 2015, Lohr and actress Idina Menzel bought a home located in Encino, Los Angeles. Menzel announced on September 23, 2016, via her Twitter account, that she and Lohr were engaged. Menzel announced their marriage via Twitter on September 25, 2017. They were married over the weekend of September 22, 2017.

== Filmography ==
=== Film ===
Year	Title	Role	Description
1984	Deniece Williams: Let's Hear It for the Boy	Young Boy	music video
1992	Newsies	Mush	
1994	D2: The Mighty Ducks	Dean Portman	
1995	A Goofy Movie	Max Goof	Singing voice
1996	D3: The Mighty Ducks	Dean Portman	
1997	Trojan War	Jock #1	
2005	Rent	Steve	
2007	Noise	Rowdy Drinker	
2008	The Wreck	Frank	
2013	Gone Missing	Bouncer	
2014	Zoe Gone	Detective Billy Ramirez	
2017	A Change of Heart	Norm	

=== Television ===
Year	Title	Role	Description
1985	St. Elsewhere	Boy	Episode: "Cheers"
1986	Throb	Small Change	Episode: "Small Change"
1987	What a Country	Boy	Episode: "Taylor Loses His Cool"
1987–1988	Bustin' Loose	Nikky Robinson	26 episodes
1988	Fantastic Max	Various voices	3 episodes
1988	Scooby-Doo and the Ghoul School	Miguel	Voice, television film
1990	Cartoon All-Stars to the Rescue	Additional voices	Television special
1990	Family Matters	Student #1	Episode: "The Science Project"
1990	Baywatch	Tod	Episode: "We Need a Vacation"
1990–1991	Peter Pan & the Pirates	Tall Twin, Hard-to-Hit, Porthos, Additional voices	16 episodes
1991	The Wonder Years	Sean	Episode: "Heartbreak"
1991	Blossom	Student	Episode: "Tough Love"
1991	Wildest Dreams	Unknown role	Television film
1994–1997	Sister, Sister	Marlon Baker, Russell	4 episodes
1997	Teen Angel	Kyle	2 episodes
1998	Perfect Assassins	Billy Collins	Television film
2000	Daydream Believers: The Monkees' Story	Micky Dolenz	Television film
2005	Law & Order: Trial by Jury	Zack Stone	Episode: "Bang and Blame"
2005	Law & Order	John Brody	Episode: "Charity Case"
2009	Loving Leah	John	Television film
2010	White Collar	Andrew	Episode: "Company Man"
2011	Blue Bloods	Tommy Barrone Jr.	Episode: "Moonlighting"
2012	The Mentalist	Benjamin Marx	Episode: "Red Rover, Red Rover"
2022	The Mighty Ducks: Game Changers	Dean Portman	Episode: "Ice Breaker"
