= Daydream Believers: The Monkees' Story =

2000 made-for-television film about the Monkees

- Genre: Biographical drama
- Based on: Hey, Hey, We're the Monkees by Harold Bronson
- Teleplay by: Ron McGee
- Directed by: Neill Fearnley
- Starring: George Stanchev; L. B. Fisher; Jeff Geddis; Aaron Lohr
- Music by: Fred Mollin
- Countries of origin: United States; Canada
- Original language: English

Production
- Executive producers: Marilyn Stonehouse; Howard Braunstein
- Producer: Susan Murdoch
- Production location: Toronto
- Cinematography: David A. Makin
- Editor: Stephen Lawrence
- Running time: 92 minutes
- Production companies: World International Network; Pebblehut Productions; CHUM Television; Rhino Films
- Budget: $3.2 million

Original release
- Network: VH1
- Release: June 28, 2000

Daydream Believers: The Monkees' Story is a 2000 American biographical drama television film about the rock and pop band the Monkees. Directed by Neill Fearnley and written by Ron McGee, the film is based on the 1996 book Hey, Hey, We're the Monkees by Harold Bronson. It stars George Stanchev as Davy Jones, L. B. Fisher as Peter Tork, Jeff Geddis as Michael Nesmith, and Aaron Lohr as Micky Dolenz. It premiered on VH1 on June 28, 2000.

== Plot ==
In 1965, producers Van Foreman and Harris Green conceive The Monkees, a TV series about a musical group. They seek a group of hip, rebellious "wild boys" with strong teenage appeal. While holding auditions for the series, the producers hire Don Kirshner as music supervisor. Eventually, Peter Tork, Mike Nesmith, Davy Jones, and Micky Dolenz, all of whom have had prior musical or acting experience, are cast as the Monkees. The group bonds with each other and practice playing together. However, at the group's first recording session, they learn that they will only be adding vocals to pre-recorded backing tracks. The Monkees pilot receives a poor test audience score, becoming the lowest-scoring pilot in the history of NBC. Van and Harris re-edit the pilot to include the Monkees' screen tests, which leads to NBC picking up the series.

In the lead-up to the show's debut, the Monkees become immensely popular. The series premiere is a ratings success, while the group's debut single, "Last Train to Clarksville", is a number one hit. A few months later, the press discover that the Monkees do not play their own instruments. Mike suggests that the group perform live in concert to prove their musical abilities. While rehearsing for an upcoming performance in Hawaii, he pushes the rest of the group aggressively. Mike later apologizes for his behavior. After the concert in Hawaii, the Monkees express their willingness to only record their own music from now on. However, Don tells the group that their next album is almost complete, with no instrumental input from the group.

As the Monkees achieve worldwide popularity, the group are faced with an ever-increasing workload. At a meeting with Don and Harris, Mike threatens to quit the group after Don reaffirms his intent to have the Monkees only provide vocals on their music. When Harris asks Mike to look at the group's contract, Mike punches a hole in the wall of the group's hotel room and leaves. Micky, Davy and Peter join Mike in the lobby and offer their support. Later, the Monkees approach Van with their demands, and he agrees to allow them to record their own music. Don's control over the group's music loosens as Van and Harris reject his next planned single.

While touring in London, the Monkees attend a party held by the Beatles in their honor. Davy tells his father about the attention the group receives. Davy reveals that although he's fine with fame, he also feels disconnected. Meanwhile, Don releases the group's next single without permission from Van or Harris, who fire him from the project. The Monkees record their third album, Headquarters, by themselves. The album reaches number one, but is quickly overshadowed by the release of the Beatles' album Sgt. Pepper's Lonely Hearts Club Band. The Monkees are divided on how to compete with the Beatles, and Mike expresses interest in producing his own music without the group.

The Monkees' series wins an Emmy Award. The group hires Jimi Hendrix to be their opening act on tour, but his music is poorly received by the group's young audience. Mike struggles to balance his family life with being a member of the Monkees. Davy struggles to record "Daydream Believer" and gets into an argument with Peter, who punches him. The Monkees want to retool the series as a variety show, but NBC will not order a third season unless they continue the series as it is. Van suggests the group make a movie. The Monkees collaborate with Van and Jack Nicholson to write Head, which is meant to destroy the group's manufactured image. After NBC cancels the Monkees' TV series, Harris criticizes the group on the set of the film. Head is a critical failure, and Van moves on from the group.

After Mike's wife Phyllis ends up in the hospital, Mike and Davy go to visit her, and also sign autographs for young fans. Without the stresses of fame, the group becomes closer to their fanbase.

== Cast ==
- George Stanchev as Davy Jones
- L. B. Fisher as Peter Tork
- Jeff Geddis as Mike Nesmith
- Aaron Lohr as Micky Dolenz
- Colin Ferguson as Van Foreman
- Stephen Bogaert as Harris Green
- Wallace Langham as Don Kirshner
- Polly Shannon as Phyllis Nesmith
- Jim Thorburn as Derek
- Christopher Crumb as John Lennon
- Jason Knight as Paul McCartney
- Tony Springer as Jimi Hendrix
- Matthew Schmelzle as Jack Nicholson

== Production ==
In 1994, Rhino Records acquired the Monkees property and associated media from Raybert Productions. According to Harold Bronson, co-founder of Rhino Records, Vin Di Bona Productions expressed interest in making a TV biopic about the Monkees for VH1 in 1998. Bronson opted to produce the project himself under Rhino Films and approached VH1 executive Mike Larkin with the idea, who suggested Rhino work with TV movie producer Howard Braunstein.

Bronson served as creative consultant on the film. Before filming began, Michael Nesmith's lawyer sent Bronson a letter threatening legal action in regards to Nesmith's "off-screen life being depicted in the movie". According to Bronson, Wallace Langham, who played Don Kirshner, was cast by VH1 and was paid $70,000 "for a week of work". Davy Jones wanted to play his own father in the film, and was offered $35,000 for one day's shooting, but declined the role after requesting twice the amount, which the production was reluctant to pay. George Stanchev, who played Davy, was almost not cast in the film because Stanchev's resume listed his height as 5'10", eight inches taller than Jones was in real life, and three inches above the producers' specified height limit for the role. Stanchev said the figure was a "wild guess".

Production began in Canada in March 2000 and lasted four weeks. Filming took place in Toronto. According to Bronson, various sets were reused from the Canadian TV series Riverdale. The concert sequence was filmed at Copps Coliseum. Location shooting took place at Lake Ontario and in Breton. Bronson wrote that director Neill Fearnley wanted to keep the Monkees' hairstyles consistent throughout the movie to save time during filming, although they did not keep the same hairstyles during the timeline depicted.

== Reception ==
Ramin Zahed of Variety commended "the production for discovering four actors who are close replicas of the original Davy, Mike, Micky and Peter", and wrote that, "While Daydream Believers does not offer any deep insights or shape three-dimensional characters, it is successful in re-creating the goofy look and charms of the original NBC show." Tom Jicha of Sun-Sentinel wrote that "Daydream Believers is even hokier as a movie than the Monkees were as a group. However, approached with moderate expectations, it can be mindless summer fun."

David Dewitt of The New York Times wrote that "The film's strong acting and thematic focus trump its sometimes sketchy and formulaic dialogue." Ken Tucker of Entertainment Weekly gave the film a grade of "D+", calling the acting "fine" and the screenplay "tin-eared and full of missed opportunities."
