= Jeff Geddis =

Canadian actor (born 1975)

- Born: James Jeffrey Hamilton Geddis; June 28, 1975 (age 51); Thunder Bay, Ontario, Canada
- Education: York University
- Occupation: Actor
- Years active: 1999–present

James Jeffrey Hamilton Geddis (born June 28, 1975) is a Canadian actor best known for his lead roles as Matt Scott on the CBC sitcom series Sophie (2008–09) and Andrew Shepherd on the Family Channel teen sitcom series The Latest Buzz (2007–10). He also played Michael Nesmith in the biographical drama television film Daydream Believers: The Monkees' Story (2000).

Geddis provided the voice of Reef on the Fresh TV teen comedy series Stoked (2009–13), as well as Devin and Tom on the Fresh TV reality comedy series Total Drama Presents: The Ridonculous Race (2015).

== Early life ==
Geddis enrolled at York University, where he graduated from their theatre program in 1998.

== Filmography ==
=== Film ===
Year	Title	Role	Notes
2001	Jason X	Johnson	
2003	Crime Spree	Wayne	
2007	Your Beautiful Cul de Sac Home	Ben McCleary	
2007	Tkaronto	John	
2009	Puck Hogs	Jeremy Jeffy	

=== Television ===
Year	Title	Role	Notes
1999	Exhibit A: Secrets of Forensic Science	Jimmy	Episode: "Double Jeopardy"
2000	Psi Factor	Reuben Galeno	Episode: "GeoCore"
2000	The Wonderful World of Disney	Student Body President	Episode: "Model Behavior"
2000	Daydream Believers: The Monkees' Story	Michael Nesmith	Television film
2000	The Famous Jett Jackson	Skip	Episode: "Extra Credit"
2000	Earth: Final Conflict	Crash	Episode: "Dream Stalker"
2000	Twice in a Lifetime	Dooley Muldoon	Episode: "The Frat Pack"
2001	A Mother's Fight for Justice	Felix	Television film
2001	Murder Among Friends	Dylan	Television film
2001	Bleacher Bums	Joey	Television film
2001	'Twas the Night	Bill	Television film
2001	Shotgun Love Dolls	Rusty	Television film
2003	Odyssey 5	Ethan Slattery	2 episodes
2004	Monster Island	G.T.	Television film
2006	Beautiful People	Jeremy	3 episodes
2007–2010	The Latest Buzz	Andrew Shepherd	59 episodes
2008–2009	Sophie	Matt Scott	29 episodes
2009	Producing Parker	Ethan	Episode: "How Green Was My Parker"
2009–2013	Stoked	Reef	40 episodes
2010	Being Erica	Darryl	10 episodes
2011	Jesse Stone: Innocents Lost	William Butler	Television film
2011	Flashpoint	Pete	Episode: "Slow Burn"
2012	Do No Harm	Mark	Television film
2012	Jesse Stone: Benefit of the Doubt	William Butler	Television film
2012	The Listener	Tim Lamb / Captain Nightfall	Episode: "Captain Nightfall"
2013	Oh Christmas Tree!	Josh	Television film
2015	Rookie Blue	Angus	Episode: "74 Epiphanies"
2015	Wishenpoof!	Bouncer	Episode: "Friends Forever"
2015	Total Drama Presents: The Ridonculous Race	Devin / Tom	24 episodes
2016	Saving Hope	Max Morrison	Episode: "Torn and Frayed"
2016	Little People	Bowling Pig	2 episodes
2017	Murdoch Mysteries	Jonah Foster	Episode: "The Missing"
2017	Christmas in Angel Falls	Stan Wilson	Television film
2019	Abby Hatcher	Buttons	2 episodes
2019	Love Hacks	Ted	Television film
2023	Workin' Moms	Young Wayne	Episode: "The End"
