= Crime Spree =

- Directed by: Brad Mirman
- Written by: Brad Mirman
- Starring: Gérard Depardieu; Harvey Keitel; Johnny Hallyday; Renaud
- Release date: September 19, 2003
- Running time: 98 minutes
- Countries: Canada; United Kingdom
- Languages: English; French
- Budget: $10,000,000 (estimated)
- Box office: $2,294,823 (Foreign)

Crime Spree is a 2003 Canadian-British comedy-heist thriller film, written and directed by Brad Mirman, starring Gérard Depardieu, Harvey Keitel and French singers Johnny Hallyday and Renaud. The fish out of water film concerns a band of French thieves who get more than they bargain for after burgling the home of a Chicago mafia boss.

== Plot ==
Daniel Foray (Gérard Depardieu) is the leader of an unusual group of burglars in Paris. When he's instructed by fence Laurent (Richard Bohringer) to go to Chicago to steal an expensive necklace in a suburban safe, the seemingly basic job becomes a fight for survival when the homeowner turns out to be mafia kingpin Frank Zammeti (Keitel), who is also under stakeout from authorities. The team are led to believe by American liaison Sophie (Joanne Kelly) that they wrote down the wrong address, but when she disappears with the money and other items taken from the mafioso, they later learn that his residence was the correct target after all and it was a setup by corrupt FBI Agent Pogue (Shawn Lawrence).

Shortly after the revelation, Pogue bludgeons Sophie to death, frames burglar Sam (Saïd Taghmaoui) and leaks the other men's names to the news media as accomplices. Pogue promises to alter evidence on condition that they hand over an audio tape stolen from Zammeti's safe, which not only declares war on fellow mob boss Angelo Giancarlo (Abe Vigoda) but strengthens the criminal case against the former, who has avoided criminal indictment. The sextet also confirm that Pogue was in cahoots with Laurent, whose interest in the heist indirectly relates to the recovery of a stolen Van Gogh painting and release of his brother from prison.

As newly minted fugitives from justice and marks of the American mafia, the thieves make amends with a black street gang they previously clashed with and facilitate a "handover" of the tape between Sam and Agent Pogue in Grant Park; Pogue is secretly filmed confessing to Sophie's murder and picks up a switched tape after a fake mugging from the gang members. Pogue is promptly killed by Zammeti and his underboss when the recording in his possession turns out to be the song Danke Schoen by Wayne Newton . To free themselves from the threat of Zammeti, burglar Raymond gifts a muscle car (stolen from a Latino street gang) to Zammeti's dim-witted younger brother, culminating in a deadly shootout between both groups of criminals. Finally, Daniel plays Giancarlo Zammeti's incriminating tape, revealing the betrayal, and requests a small sum of money and safe return to France in exchange for the heads up.

With Zammeti gone and Laurent also in line to get "whacked" by Giancarlo's right-hand man, the burglars discover they were once again duped with a suitcase filled with counterfeit money. Before embarking as stowaways, they notice Laurent's Van Gogh painting get blown into Chicago River and comically dive into the water, with the outcome of their latest pursuit unknown.

== Main cast ==
- Gérard Depardieu - Daniel Foray
- Harvey Keitel - Frank Zammeti
- Johnny Hallyday - Marcel Burot
- Renaud - Zéro
- Saïd Taghmaoui - Sam Zerhouni
- Stéphane Freiss - Julien Labesse
- Shawn Lawrence - Agent Pogue
- Albert Dray - Raymond Gayet
- Joanne Kelly - Sophie Greer
- Richard Bohringer - Laurent Bastaldi
- Abe Vigoda - Angelo Giancarlo
- Gino Marrocco - Joey Two Tons
- Sal Figliomeni - Nicky The Rake
- Diego Chambers - Raphael Ruiz
- Carlos Diaz - Hector
- Ron Kennel - Felix
- Chris Collins - Lamar
