= Leena (Warehouse 13) =

Fictional character on American television science fiction series Warehouse 13

- First appearance: "Pilot"
- Last appearance: "Endless"
- Created by: Jane Espenson
- Portrayed by: Genelle Williams

In-universe information
- Occupation: Bed and breakfast proprietor

Leena (Genelle Williams) is a fictional character on the U.S. television science fiction series, Warehouse 13 (2009–2014). She was the proprietor of Leena's Bed and Breakfast, where the Warehouse Agents live. Leena has the ability to read a person's aura and sense their life force.

== Character history ==
Leena is a fictional character from the television series Warehouse 13, portrayed by Genelle Williams. Throughout the series, Leena's personal history remains largely undisclosed, including her last name. However, it is suggested that she had a significant relationship with Mrs. Frederic (portrayed by C. C. H. Pounder), the caretaker of Warehouse 13.

=== Character Development ===
Leena's character is gradually revealed over the course of the series. In the Season 3 finale episode "Stand," it is implied that she shares a long-standing connection with Mrs. Frederic. When threatened by Marcus Diamond, Leena is saved by Mrs. Frederic, who references a promise made to Leena years ago.

=== Role within Warehouse 13 ===
Leena is introduced as an employee at Warehouse 13, primarily serving as a consultant. Her duties involve sensing the energies of artifacts and determining their appropriate storage locations within the warehouse. She also oversees the maintenance of certain artifacts to prevent them from causing disruptions. Leena possesses intimate knowledge of the warehouse's secrets, often assisting field agents in their missions.

=== Relationships with Other Characters ===
Leena's relationship with Artie Nielsen, the warehouse's caretaker, predates the arrival of Agents Myka Bering and Pete Lattimer. While the exact duration of their acquaintance is undisclosed, Leena mentions not being present during an event fifteen years prior involving Artie and his former partner, James MacPherson.

=== Involvement in Storylines ===
In the Season 1 finale episode "MacPherson," Leena is briefly implicated in collaborating with James MacPherson, although it is later revealed that her actions were under MacPherson's control through an artifact. This incident results in residual effects, causing Leena to suffer from headaches and vertigo until the Regents intervene.

In Season 4, Leena tragically meets her demise during a confrontation with Artie, who is influenced by an artifact's evil. Despite efforts to save her, her death proves irreversible, leaving Artie burdened with guilt.

=== Legacy ===
Leena's character contributes to the emotional depth and narrative complexity of Warehouse 13, leaving a lasting impact on both the storyline and the characters she interacted with.

== Skills and abilities ==
Leena is able to read or sense auras and energy forces. She can sense whether something is living or not. She uses her aura-reading abilities on new artifact arrivals at the Warehouse. Likewise, she apparently does this so that the energies of the artifacts do not react badly with each other and cause unwanted static build-up that could harm Warehouse agents. For example, when handling the arrival of the Honjo Masamune samurai sword, she wandered the aisles, looking for an appropriate location to store it, finally stopping at an apparently random spot and stating, "This feels right." Leena's authority over artifact placement is further demonstrated when Artie, while contemplating where to store Edgar Allan Poe artifacts, states, "We'll stick them in, yeah, Madrid section, that is if Leena agrees."

Her aura-reading ability is also helpful in catching any potentially over-active objects that try to "escape" Warehouse confines, such as Harry Houdini's Wallet, which she sensed in the B&B and recovered from its hiding place under Myka's bed.
