= Warehouse 13 =

American science fiction television series (2009–2014)

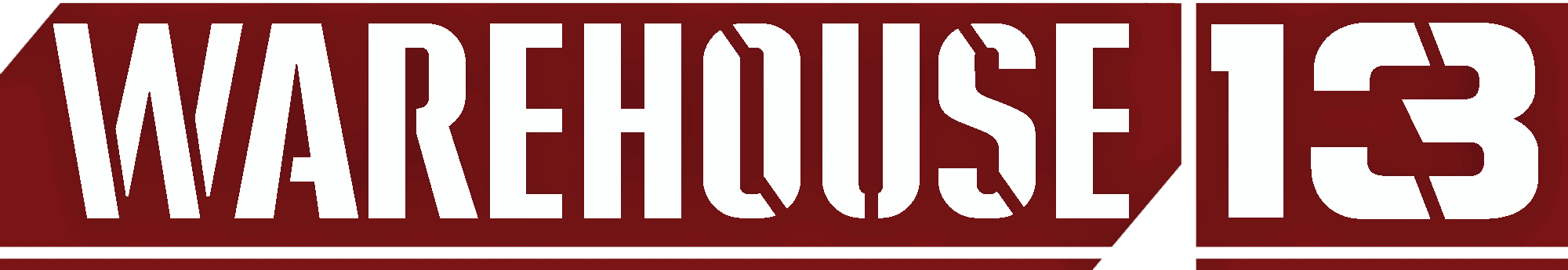
- Genre: Science fantasy; Science fiction; Mystery
- Created by: Jane Espenson; D. Brent Mote
- Starring: Eddie McClintock; Joanne Kelly; Saul Rubinek; Genelle Williams; Simon Reynolds; Allison Scagliotti; Aaron Ashmore
- Country of origin: United States
- Original language: English
- No. of seasons: 5
- No. of episodes: 65 (list of episodes)

Production
- Executive producers: Jack Kenny; David Simkins; Drew Z. Greenberg
- Production locations: Toronto, Ontario, Canada
- Cinematography: Mike McMurray
- Editor: Andrew Sekilr
- Camera setup: Multiple-camera
- Running time: 42–44 minutes 87 minutes ("Pilot")
- Production company: Universal Cable Productions

Original release
- Network: Syfy
- Release: July 7, 2009 – May 19, 2014

Related
- Eureka; Alphas

Warehouse 13 is an American science fiction comedy drama television series created by Jane Espenson and D. Brent Mote and executive produced by Jack Kenny and David Simkins for Universal Cable Productions which originally ran from July 7, 2009, to May 19, 2014, on the Syfy network.

The series concerns Secret Service agents Pete Lattimer (Eddie McClintock) and Myka Bering (Joanne Kelly) who are assigned to Warehouse 13, a top secret South Dakota facility for the containment of supernatural artifacts headed by former NSA cryptographer Artie Nielsen (Saul Rubinek). The agents are tasked with retrieving further artifacts, aided by hacker Claudia Donovan (Allison Scagliotti) and ATF agent Steve Jinks (Aaron Ashmore).

The series has been described as "part The X-Files, part Raiders of the Lost Ark and part Moonlighting", and compared to Friday the 13th: The Series (1987–1990).

== Plot ==
The series follows U.S. Secret Service Agents Myka Bering and Pete Lattimer when they are assigned to the secretive Warehouse 13 for supernatural artifacts. It is located in a barren landscape in South Dakota, and they initially regard the assignment as punishment. As they go about their assignments to retrieve missing artifacts and investigate reports of new ones, they come to understand the importance of what they are doing. In episode 4 of the first season, they meet Claudia Donovan, who is searching for her missing brother; in season 2, she joins the team as their technology expert. In episode 1 of season 3, Steve Jinks, an agent from the Bureau of Alcohol, Tobacco, Firearms and Explosives, comes aboard.

=== Fictional history ===
The series posits that there have been a dozen incarnations of the warehouse before the present-day 13th in South Dakota. Warehouse 1 was built between 336 and 323 BC on the orders of Alexander the Great as a place to keep artifacts obtained by war. After Alexander died, the warehouse was moved to Egypt, establishing the practice of locating the warehouse in the most powerful empire of the day, under the reasoning that it will be best defended there. Egypt's Ptolemaic rulers appointed a group of people, known as the Regents, to oversee the warehouse and act as its first "agents" and collectors of artifacts. Warehouse 2 lasted until the Roman conquest of Egypt.

Other warehouses throughout history include: Warehouse 3 in Western Roman Empire (Italy), Warehouse 4 in Hunnic Empire until the death of Attila the Hun, Warehouse 5 in the Byzantine Empire, Warehouse 6 in Cambodia under the Khmer Empire, Warehouse 7 in the Mongol Empire under Genghis Khan, Warehouse 8 in Germany during the Holy Roman Empire (1260–1517), Warehouse 9 in the Ottoman capital of Constantinople until the death of Suleiman the Magnificent, Warehouse 10 in Mughal Empire (India), Warehouse 11 in the Russian Empire under the Romanov Dynasty (the 1812 Napoleonic War with Russia was an attempt to seize control of Warehouse 11), and Warehouse 12 in the United Kingdom from 1830 until 1914. It was during the time of Warehouse 11 that the Regents began to employ agents to gather and protect artifacts. This practice continued under Warehouse 12, with British agents traveling further and further searching for artifacts to add to the collection.

The next move brought the warehouse to South Dakota in the United States. Unlike previous warehouses, which were placed in the centers of their empires, Warehouse 13 was located in a remote area of South Dakota to hide it. The first Warehouse 13 was built in 1898, but the structure burned down because of an insufficient understanding of how to safely store artifacts. The move to the rebuilt and current Warehouse 13 occurred in 1914 at the onset of World War I. The warehouse was designed by Thomas Edison, Nikola Tesla, and M. C. Escher, while the warehouse's expansion joints were created by Albert Einstein.

=== Artifacts and gadgets ===
Originally, artifacts are items connected to some historical or mythological figure or event. Each artifact has been imbued with something from its creator, user, or a major event in history. Some are well known: Studio 54's Disco ball; Lewis Carroll's looking glass, which contains an evil entity called "Alice" that can possess other people's bodies (Myka in Season 1 episode "Duped"), leaving their minds trapped in the mirror; and Edgar Allan Poe's pen and a volume of his writing, which can make whatever the user writes a reality. Some are not: Lizzie Borden had a mirrored compact that today compels users to kill their loved ones with an axe; Marilyn Monroe owned a brush that now turns its user's hair platinum blonde, which Myka once used on herself while under the influence of W. C. Fields' juggling balls that induce drunkenness and blackouts. Others may have humorous effects, such as Ivan Pavlov's bell, which will call any dog to you but causes excessive drooling for 24 hours, and a magic kettle that grants wishes but produces a ferret if the wish is impossible. The artifacts react with electricity and can be neutralized by immersion in a mysterious purple goo or placed inside a neutralizing reflective bag, both produced by Global Dynamics, a research laboratory from Warehouse 13's sister show, Eureka. Artie has also mentioned that ingesting neutralizer will make you "see things". During episode 403 (season 4), Mrs. Frederic shows Claudia an artifact being created—a silver bracelet worn by an ordinary person who exhibits extraordinary courage.

== Cast and characters ==
Warehouse agents are provided by the host country of the warehouse, in this case from various government agencies (such as the Secret Service, FBI, ATF, CDC, and DEA, etc.). Agents of Warehouse 13 in particular were chosen either for their above-average intelligence (Artie is an expert NSA codebreaker, Myka has an eidetic memory and a wealth of encyclopedic knowledge, Claudia and H.G. Wells are both expert inventors) or because they possess a kind of extranormal ability (Pete and Mrs. Frederic both receive "vibes" regarding situations; Leena can read people's auras; and Jinks has the ability to tell when a person is lying).

=== Main ===
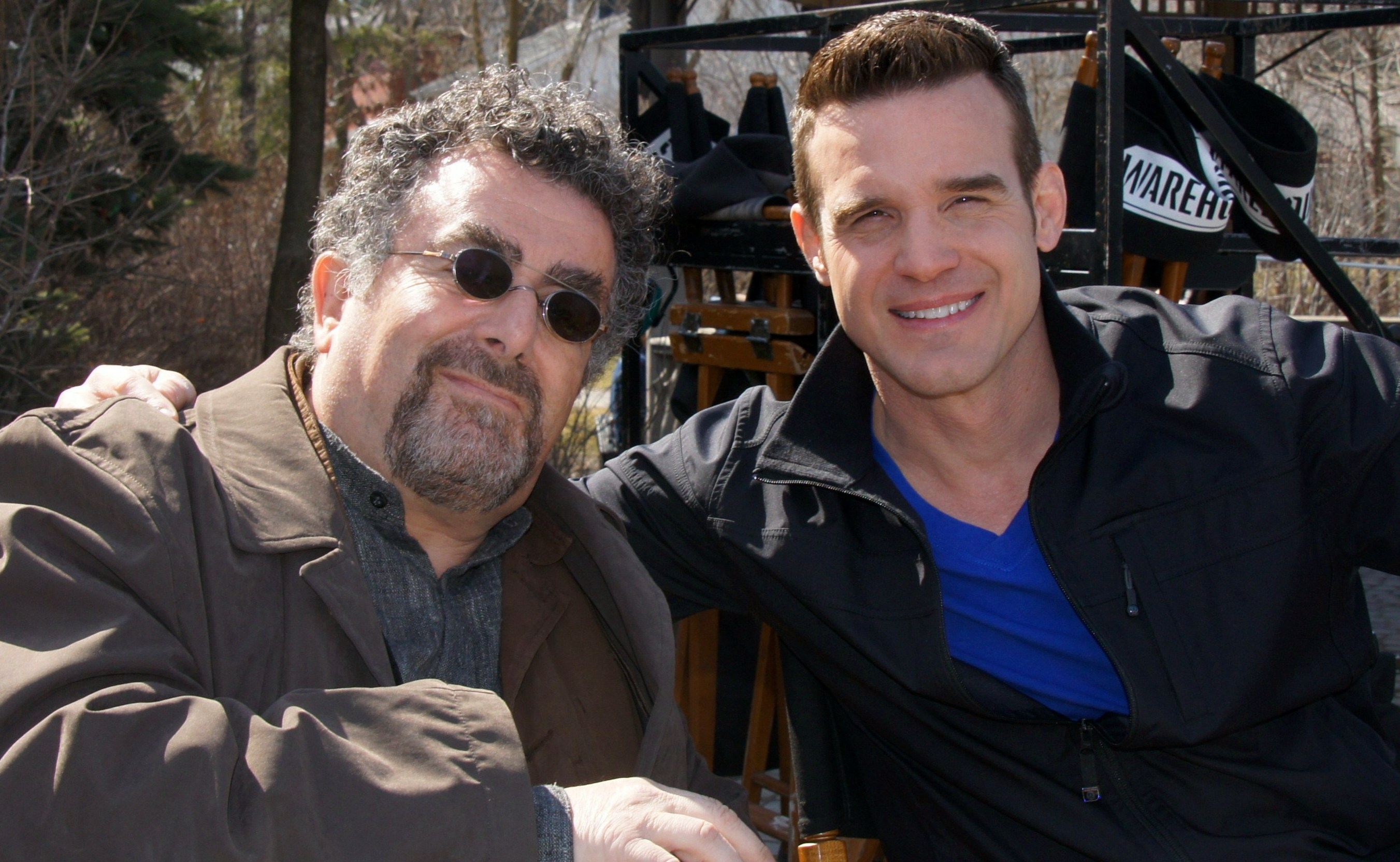
Saul Rubinek and Eddie McClintock

- Eddie McClintock as Pete Lattimer is a "rule-bender" Secret Service agent, now assigned to Warehouse 13. He has been able to pick up "vibes", both good and bad, since he was a child. The series frequently makes references to his being a recovering alcoholic who already had been sober for more than eight years when the series started. He is also fond of cookies.
- Joanne Kelly as Myka Bering, once a rising star in the Secret Service, is a by-the-book agent. She has a scrupulous eye for detail and possesses an eidetic memory. She also has extensive knowledge of books, having grown up in a book store. Reference to a former partner that ended in tragedy is frequently made, such as in the season one episode "Regrets".
- Saul Rubinek as Artie Nielsen is the Special Agent in Charge at Warehouse 13. A former cryptographer and codebreaker for the United States National Security Agency (NSA), he has spent over 40 years at the Warehouse and is very knowledgeable about artifacts, both in the Warehouse and out in the world. He becomes a surrogate father to Claudia.
- Genelle Williams as Leena (seasons 1–4; guest season 5), is the proprietor of the bed and breakfast in nearby Univille, where the team lives. She can read a person's aura.
- Simon Reynolds as Daniel Dickinson (season 1; guest season 2), is Pete and Myka's former boss in Washington, D.C.
- Allison Scagliotti as Claudia Donovan (seasons 2–5; recurring season 1) is described as a "young, hip, brilliant techno-wiz" who earns a job at Warehouse 13 after discovering too many of its secrets. She can hack almost any computer network and occasionally modifies artifacts to suit her needs (which does not always end well).
- Aaron Ashmore as Steve Jinks (seasons 4–5; recurring season 3) was an ATF agent before being recruited to Warehouse 13 for his ability to tell when people are lying. In "Emily Lake", he is killed by Marcus Diamond on orders of Walter Sykes. In Season 4, he is resurrected by Claudia using the metronome. Ashmore was promoted to series regular beginning with the episode "Personal Effects".

=== Recurring ===
- CCH Pounder as Mrs. Irene Frederic
- Roger Rees as James MacPherson (seasons 1–4)
- Mark A. Sheppard as Benedict Valda (season 2; guest seasons 1 & 5)
- Jaime Murray as Helena G. Wells (seasons 2–5)
- Paula Garcés as Kelly Hernandez (season 2; guest season 5)
- Nolan Gerard Funk as Todd (season 2)
- Faran Tahir as Adwin Kosan (seasons 3–4; guest season 2)
- Kate Mulgrew as Jane Lattimer (seasons 3–4)
- Ashley Williams as Sally Stukowski (season 3)
- Sasha Roiz as Marcus Diamond (seasons 3–4)
- Kelly Hu as Abigail Cho (seasons 4–5)
- Josh Blaylock as Nick Powell (season 4)
- Chryssie Whitehead as Claire Donovan (season 5)

== Production ==
The network, then named SciFi, originally ordered a two-hour pilot episode written by Farscape creator Rockne S. O'Bannon, Battlestar Galactica co-Executive Producer Jane Espenson, and D. Brent Mote. Jace Alexander eventually directed a revised version written by Espenson, Mote, and Blade: The Series executive producer David Simkins. SciFi ordered an additional nine episodes on September 19, 2008. The series premiered in the U.S. on July 7, 2009 concurrent with the name-change to Syfy. Executive Producer Jack Kenny took over showrunning duties beginning with Episode 2, and continued to run the series until its conclusion. The series was filmed in and around Toronto, Ontario.

== Crossovers ==
=== Character crossovers ===
Warehouse 13 was part of Syfy's developing shared fictional universe, with several characters crossing over between series:

- Global Dynamics researcher Douglas Fargo (played by Neil Grayston) from Eureka traveled to South Dakota to update Warehouse 13's computer system in the Warehouse 13 episode "13.1" (S2E5). Warehouse 13 computer wizard Claudia Donovan (played by Allison Scagliotti) subsequently traveled to the town of Eureka, Oregon to check out the technological marvels at Global Dynamics in the Eureka episode "Crossing Over" (S4E5). Fargo again appeared in the Warehouse 13 episode "Don't Hate the Player" (S3E6) when Claudia, Lattimer, and Bering traveled to Palo Alto, California, to find Fargo beta testing a virtual reality simulator with the aid of a dangerous artifact.
- Dr. Vanessa Calder (played by Lindsay Wagner), who appeared in the Warehouse 13 episodes "For the Team" (S2E7), "Buried" (S2E11), "Love Sick" (S3E3) and "Endless Terror" (S5E1) as a physician and love interest of Artie, traveled to Fenton, Pennsylvania, to investigate a series of deaths in which the victims suffered massive organ failures in the Alphas episode "Never Let Me Go" (S1E5).
- Hugo Miller spent some time in the town of Eureka, departing with Douglas Fargo at the end of episode "13.1"; he returns in "Love Sick", commenting that, "every week [there] something seems to go 'boom'!" His presence there is off screen.

=== Actor crossovers ===
Warehouse 13 imported characters from other TV series, but would often cast pairs of actors who had worked together on other series as single-episode characters.

- Erica Cerra and Niall Matter who work together on Eureka played a couple with an artifact in "Duped" (S1E8).
- Joe Morton who also works on Eureka played an inmate in "Regrets" (S1E9).
- Sean Maher and Jewel Staite who worked together on Firefly played an almost-couple in "Mild Mannered" (S2E2).
- Paula Garcés and Laura Harris who worked together on Defying Gravity were both cast members in "Merge with Caution" (S2E8).
  - Before this, Garcés first appeared in "Beyond Our Control" (S2E3).
- Sasha Roiz and Alessandra Torresani who were cast members in Caprica were both cast members in "Shadows" (S3E9).
  - Before this, Roiz first appeared in "Love Sick" (S3E3).
- Kirsten Nelson and Timothy Omundson who worked together on Psych were both cast in "No Pain, No Gain" (S4E5).
- Missi Pyle and Enrico Colantoni who were cast members in Galaxy Quest were together in "The Big Snag" (S4E13).
- Ricardo Antonio Chavira and Tuc Watkins who worked together on Desperate Housewives were both featured in "Instinct" (S4E15).
- Josh Blaylock and Cynthia Watros who worked together on Video Game High School were featured separately in "What Matters Most" (S4E17).
- James Marsters and Anthony Stewart Head who were both in Buffy the Vampire Slayer were also together in "All the Time in the World" (S4E19) and "The Truth Hurts" (S4E20).
- Ryan Cartwright and Erin Way who worked together on Alphas were cast together in the third episode of the final season: "A Faire to Remember" (S5E3).

== Reception ==
The series premiere was Syfy's third largest debut to date, garnering 3.5 million viewers. The first six episodes were all among the top ten highest rated series episodes on Syfy. Episode 6, "Burnout", drew 4.4 million viewers, setting the record for Syfy's highest rated show. Season 2 began July 6, 2010. It was renewed October 5, 2010, for a third season of 13 episodes, which began July 11, 2011. It was renewed for a fourth season August 11, 2011, which began July 23, 2012. On May 16, 2013, Syfy renewed the series for a six-episode fifth and final season, which aired its series finale on May 19, 2014.

Warehouse 13's series premiere was the most-watched cable show on American television that night. With 3.5 million viewers, it was also Syfy's third best premiere ever, behind Stargate Atlantis (2004) and Eureka (2006).

Joanne Ostrow of The Denver Post described it as "X-Files light, with the bickering Scully and Mulder stand-ins going off on Indiana Jones-style adventures." IGN reviewer Ramsey Isler gave the pilot a positive review, but felt that it was not enough to give Syfy "a chance to once again boast the best sci-fi show on TV."

Ken Tucker of Entertainment Weekly gave it a negative review in July 2009, describing it as an "unholy cross between The X-Files, Bones, and Raiders of the Lost Ark." In July 2010, Tucker amended his opinion, stating that "Warehouse improved as it went along" and "grew more riveting"; he subsequently gave the show a rating of "B".

In 2010, the series' composer, Edward Rogers, was nominated for an Emmy Award for Best Original Main Title Theme Music.

Warehouse 13 has received seven 2012 Portal Award nominations, including best television series, best actor (Eddie McClintock), best actress (Joanne Kelly), best supporting actor (Saul Rubinek), best supporting actress (Allison Scagliotti), best special guest (Jaime Murray as Helena G. Wells), and best episode ("Emily Lake"). It was Eddie McClintock's third straight nomination and the second nomination for Saul Rubinek and Allison Scagliotti.

As of September 2020, Warehouse 13 scored 82 percent among all critics (60 percent among top critics) and 87 percent with audience members on Rotten Tomatoes.

== Episodes ==
Season	Episodes		Originally released	
Season	Episodes		First released	Last released
1	13		July 7, 2009	September 22, 2009
2	13		July 6, 2010	December 7, 2010
3	13		July 11, 2011	December 6, 2011
4	20	10	July 23, 2012	October 1, 2012
4	20	10	April 29, 2013	July 8, 2013
5	6		April 14, 2014	May 19, 2014

== Home media ==
=== DVD release ===
DVD Name	Ep #	Release dates			Additional features
DVD Name	Ep #	Region 1	Region 2	Region 4	Additional features
Warehouse 13: Season One	13	June 29, 2010	June 22, 2010	March 2, 2011	Season 2 Sneak Peek, Deleted Scenes, Artie-Facts, Saul Searching, What's in the Shadows, Ye Olde Curiosity Shoppe, "Claudia" Feature Commentary, "Implosion" Feature Commentary, "Macpherson" Feature Commentary, Pilot Commentary with Cast And Crew, Pilot Podcast with Series Star Saul Rubinek, Gag Reel, Syfy Featurettes. NOTE: For Season 1, some of the music from broadcast has been replaced by generic music.
Warehouse 13: Season Two	13	June 28, 2011	July 5, 2011	July 4, 2012	Deleted Scenes, Gag Reel, "Crossing Over" Eureka cross over episode, A Thrilleromedy, A Stitch in Time, Designing the Warehouse,"Time Will Tell" Commentary, "Merge With Caution" Commentary, "Reset" Commentary, Video Blogs, Photo Gallery. Does not contain season 2 episode 13 "Secret Santa".
Warehouse 13: Season Three	13	July 10, 2012	September 17, 2012	November 7, 2013	Of Monster and Men – 10 part animated series including exclusive chapter, season 2 episode 13 Secret Santa, Gag Reel, Guest Starring..., Love Sick, Audio commentaries on The New Guy, 3...2...1... and The 40th Floor. Does not contain season 3 episode 13 The Greatest Gift. (The R2 DVD includes The Greatest Gift.)
Warehouse 13: Season Four	20	July 9, 2013	September 2, 2013	November 27, 2014	Extended, Deleted and Alternate Scenes, Gag Reel, Grand Designs Web Series, Podcasts: No Pain, No Gain, Fractures, Endless Wonder, Second Chance, The Ones You Love, We All Fall Down, A New Hope, An Evil Within, Personal Effects, There’s Always a Downside, The Truth Hurts, The Sky’s the Limit
Warehouse 13: Season Five	6	May 20, 2014	February 12, 2015	November 26, 2015	Extended, Deleted and Alternate Scenes, Endless Deleted Scenes, Gag Reel, Holiday Episode: The Greatest Gift, Warehouse 13: Behind the Shelves, Podcasts: Endless Terror, Secret Service, A Faire to Remember, Savage Seduction, Cangku Shisi, Endless
Warehouse 13: The Complete Series	64	May 20, 2014	September 15, 2014	November 26, 2015	

=== Streaming ===
As of 2021 five seasons of Warehouse 13 are available on Peacock. Individual episodes can be purchased at the Google Play Store, Apple TV+, Vudu, iTunes, Amazon Prime Video, Fandango Now.

== In other media ==
=== Comics ===
The first part of a five-part comic series was released in August 2011 by Dynamite Entertainment with part five released in December 2011. A trade paperback was released in May 2012 containing all five parts.

=== Novels ===
- Cox, Greg (June 2011). Warehouse 13: A Touch of Fever. New York: Simon and Schuster.

=== Games ===
In August 2016, Infinite Dreams Gaming and Conquest Gaming announced Warehouse 13: The Board Game coming to Kickstarter. It is a semi-cooperative game for three to five players taking the role of Warehouse Agents with one player working secretly against the Warehouse. Agents must work together trying to retrieve artifacts while uncovering the identity of the traitor.

An expansion was funded on Kickstarter in 2021, but still has not been fulfilled as of July 2024 with the last update in March 2022.

=== Tie-Ins with Other Novels ===
In the John Ringo novel Queen of Wands, Artie and Claudia make an appearance at the end of the novella 'The Shadow of Death' to take possession of an Osemi artifact from Barbara Everett.

== See also ==
- Control (video game)
- The Librarian
- Lobotomy Corporation
- SCP Foundation
- Fringe (TV series)
