= Joanne Kelly =

Canadian actress (born 1978)

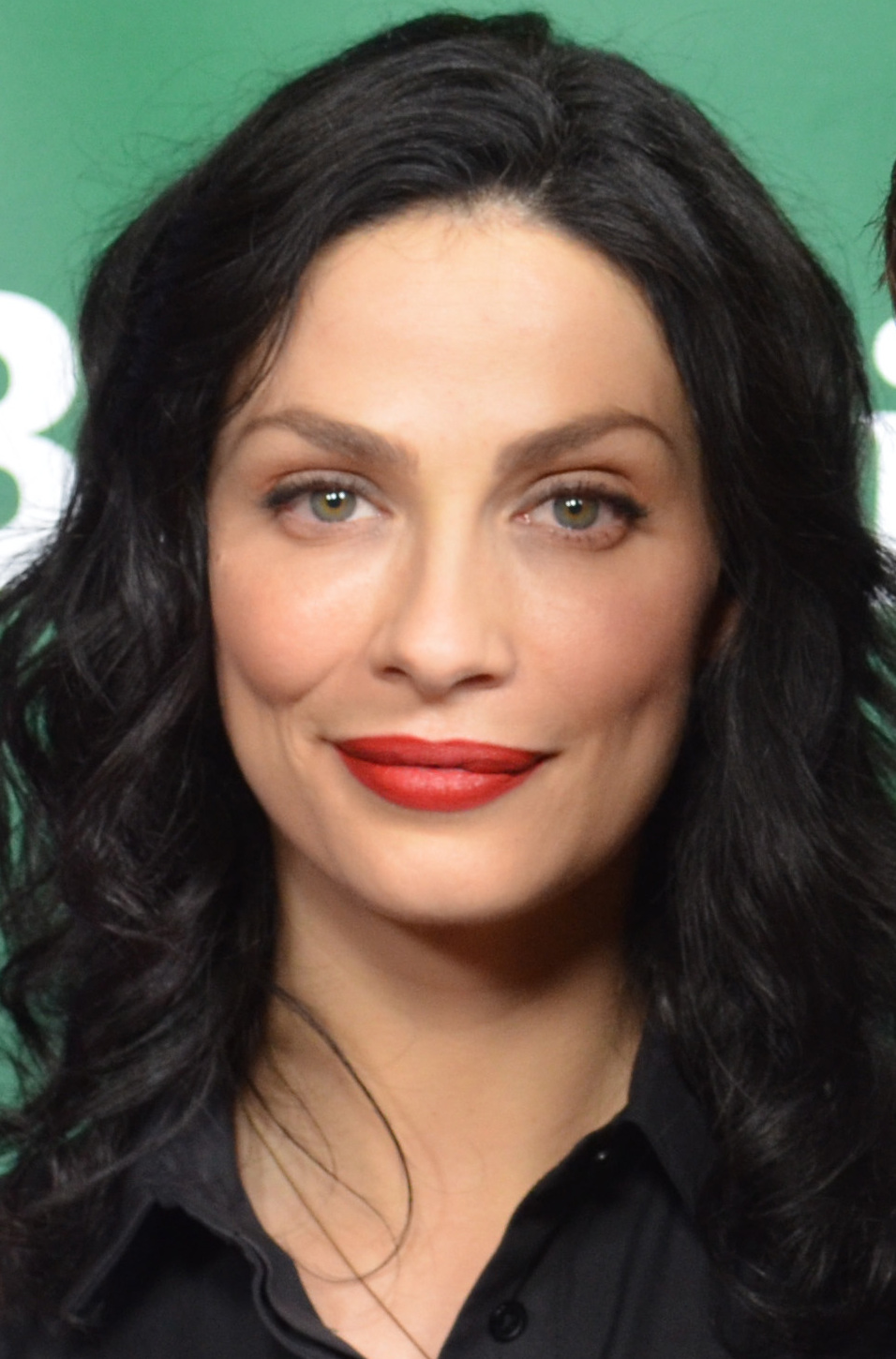
- Kelly in 2014
- Born: December 22, 1978 (age 47); Bay d'Espoir, Newfoundland, Canada
- Occupation: Actress
- Years active: 2002–present

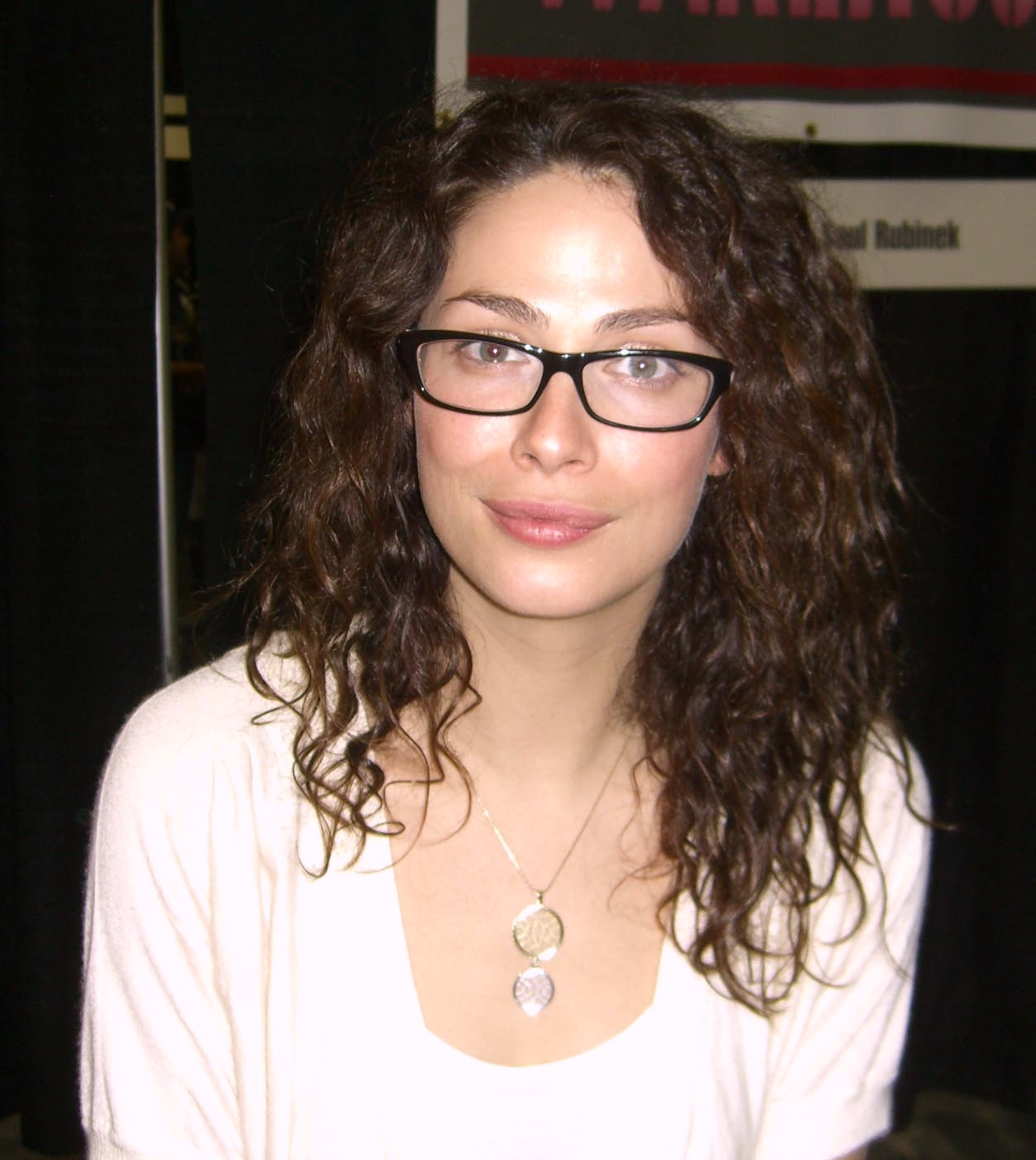
Joanne Kelly (2009)

Joanne M. Kelly (born December 22, 1978) is a Canadian actress, known for her appearances in films such as Going the Distance, and in the TV series Warehouse 13 as the character Myka Bering, a Secret Service agent.

== Early life and education ==
Joanne Kelly was born in Bay d'Espoir, Newfoundland. She moved to Nova Scotia at the age of 17, where she entered Acadia University, studying drama and English.

== Career ==
Kelly's first major role was in the 2002 film drama, The Bay of Love and Sorrows, which followed smaller roles in the 2003 made-for-television movie, Mafia Doctor (starring Paul Sorvino and Olympia Dukakis), and in the film Crime Spree (starring Gérard Depardieu and Harvey Keitel). She played alongside actor Paul Gross in Slings and Arrows and Gordon Pinsent in Heyday. She appeared on the TV series Jeremiah from J. Michael Straczynski, as the character Libby (on Showtime, from 2003 to 2004). She also played the role of Sara Collins in Fox's 2006 series Vanished, and as the vampire Bianca in SciFi's The Dresden Files. She also appeared in the 2004 film Going the Distance.

From 2009 until 2014, she played the role of Secret Service agent Myka Bering on the Syfy series Warehouse 13.

She also stars in the 2014 independent film Runoff, written and directed by Kimberly Levin, for which her performance received critical acclaim.

== Awards and nominations ==
Kelly was nominated for a Gemini Award in 2006 for Best Performance by an Actress in a Leading Role in a Dramatic Program or Mini-Series for Playing House.

== Filmography ==
=== Film ===
Year	Title	Role	Notes
2002	The Bay of Love and Sorrows	Madonna Eveline Brassaurd	
2003	Crime Spree	Sophie Nicols	
2004	Going the Distance	Sasha	
2008	Remembering Phil	Julia	
2013	Extraction	Natalie Meyers	
2014	Runoff	Betty Freeman	
2014	Don't Blink	Claire	
2015	Closet Monster	Brin Madly	
2016	Away from Everywhere	Hannah	

=== Television ===
Year	Title	Role	Notes
2002	Mentors	Mata Hari	"Secrets and Lies"
2002	Tracker	Zareth	"To Catch a Desserian" & "Remember When"
2002	Largo Winch	Elektra Dane	"Love Hurts"
2002	Mutant X	Kim	"The Future Revealed"
2003	Mafia Doctor	Loreena	TV movie
2003	Jeremiah	Liberty 'Libby' Kaufman	8 episodes
2004	Snakes and Ladders	Trudy Jennings	"Sisters"
2004	The Newsroom	George's Hallucination	"The Second Coming"
2005	The Catch	Mo Kozikowski	TV pilot
2005	Whiskey Echo	Jenna Breeden	TV miniseries
2005	Selling Innocence	Simone	TV movie
2005	Slings and Arrows	Sarah	5 episodes
2006	I Am an Apartment Building	Kelly	TV short
2006	Playing House	Frannie Mackenzie	TV movie
2006	Heyday!	Laurie Dwyer	TV movie
2006	Solar Attack	Joanna Parks	TV movie
2006	Vanished	Sara Collins	13 episodes
2007	The Dresden Files	Bianca	TV miniseries :"Bad Blood" & "Storm Front"
2008	Supernatural	Michelle Montgomery	"Metamorphosis"
2008–2009	Jack Hunter and the Lost Treasure of Ugarit	Nadia Ramadan	TV miniseries : Parts 1, 2 & 3
2008–2009	Diamonds	Stephanie Dresser	"Part One", "Part Two"
2009	Castle	Lee Wax	"Ghosts"
2009–2014	Warehouse 13	Myka Bering	65 episodes
2010	Republic of Doyle	Stacey Layden	"The One Who Got Away"
2010	The Deep End	Mia Smith	"White Lies, Black Ties"
2010	CSI: Miami	Heather Chapman	"Happy Birthday"
2011	No Ordinary Family	Rachel Jacobs	"No Ordinary Detention"
2013	Hostages	Vanessa Moore	9 Episodes
2015	Vox	Dana Burke	TV movie
2015	The Returned	Kara Pine	"Peter"
2016	Zoo	Allison Shaw	Recurring
2017	The Disappearance	Catherine Sullivan	Recurring
2018	The Resident	Catherine Loy	"Lost Love"
2018	Prescription for Danger	Ivy Fisher	TV movie
2019–2021	Godfather of Harlem	Amy Vanderbilt	4 Episodes
2022	Severance	Nina Kilmer	"The You You Are"
2022	City on a Hill	Letitia Dryden	Recurring
2023	Hudson & Rex	Gina Reeves	Season 5 Episode 11 "Working for the Weekend"
2025	S.W.A.T.	Kate Walz	Season 8 Episode 11 "Amber"
