= Ian Nelson =

Ian Nelson may refer to:

- Ian Nelson (actor, born 1982), American actor
- Ian Nelson (musician) (1956–2006), English New Wave musician
- Ian Nelson (actor, born 1995), American actor
- Ian Nelson (footballer), Scottish footballer
