= Con Man (web series) =

2015 American web series

- Genre: Comedy
- Created by: Alan Tudyk
- Starring: Alan Tudyk; Nathan Fillion; Mindy Sterling
- Composers: Stephen Phillips; Tim Paruszkiewicz
- Country of origin: United States
- Original language: English
- No. of seasons: 2
- No. of episodes: 25

Production
- Executive producers: PJ Haarsma; Alan Tudyk; Nathan Fillion
- Cinematography: Jay Hunter
- Editors: Abe Levy; Ryan Brown; Jeremy Jurin
- Running time: 10–17 minutes

Original release
- Network: Vimeo (season 1); Comic-Con HQ (season 2)
- Release: September 30, 2015 – January 26, 2017

Con Man is an American comedy web series created, written, directed by, and starring Alan Tudyk. The series follows cult science fiction actor Wray Nerely (Tudyk), as he tours the convention circuit. Tudyk, one of the stars of the 2002 science fiction TV show Firefly, based Con Man loosely upon his own experiences. The series is co-produced by PJ Haarsma and by Nathan Fillion, who also co-stars in it. Crowdfunded through Indiegogo, Con Man set records for crowdfunding a web series by raising more than $1 million in 24 hours and more than $3.1 million overall.

The series premiered on September 30, 2015, on Vimeo, with the first season consisting of 13 episodes. The second season premiered on December 8, 2016, on Comic-Con HQ, Comic-Con's subscription streaming video service and consisted of 12 episodes. In 2017, the series was acquired by Syfy and had its television debut on September 9, 2017, where the episodes were combined to produce half-hour installments for airing.

== Plot ==
Wray Nerely (Tudyk) is a struggling actor who starred as a spaceship pilot on Spectrum, a canceled science fiction series that went on to become a cult classic. Wray's good friend Jack Moore (Nathan Fillion), who starred as the ship's captain, has become an A-list movie star. Frustrated by Jack's success and his lack thereof, Wray travels the science fiction convention circuit, makes appearances at comic book stores, and visits pop culture events. He navigates the odd people and incidents he encounters along the way while learning to love the fans he has.

== Cast ==
=== Main cast ===
- Alan Tudyk as Wray Nerely, a struggling actor who formerly starred on Spectrum as pilot Cash Wayne. To his dissatisfaction, he is pigeonholed into science fiction roles, the only non–science fiction role being an episode of Justified. (Note: Tudyk's guest appearance in an episode of Justified was credited as Wray Nerely.) Tudyk said of his character, "Wray struggles with his career and he's very unhappy in his career. Even though he's a huge star at conventions, he comes home to his one-bedroom apartment and hopes to get a guest star spot on NCIS: Topeka." Wray's former role as a pilot on a canceled science fiction show and later cult hit is a nod to Tudyk's role on Firefly.
- Nathan Fillion as Jack Moore, Wray's good friend who formerly starred on Spectrum as Captain James Raaker. Unlike Wray, Jack has "gone on to incredible action-hero stardom, like Matt Damon" and so "is a daily reminder of what Wray wishes he had". Tudyk said of Fillion's involvement, "Nathan was an obvious choice for this project from the beginning. I’ve wanted to work with him again since Firefly, really." Jack's former role as a captain on a canceled science fiction show and later cult hit is a nod to Fillion's role on Firefly.
- Mindy Sterling as Bobbie, Wray's booking agent. She receives fifteen percent of all of Wray's paychecks, and to increase this amount, she downgrades Wray's flights and accommodations so the convention will pay him the difference in cash. Though it is observed she is not conventionally attractive, she often has sex with convention guests. She was formerly an actress and, though is not famous, has a varied filmography ranging from a science fiction B movie to snuff films. Tudyk stated Bobbie is his favorite character and said she "represents the 'carnie' aspect of the conventions".

=== Recurring cast ===
Of the "kooky" people who populate the series, Tudyk emphasized, "the kooky people in Con Man are not the fans. [The fans] are the heroes of this. The kooky people are the people who work in the conventions. [...] It's the people that we've met along the way that are pulling the strings behind the curtain, in addition to kooky celebrities."

- Casper Van Dien as John Boutell, the bartender at every bar, regardless of its location.
- Sean Astin as himself, an actor who played Samwise Gamgee in The Lord of the Rings film series. While he advises Wray to accept his status as a beloved cult icon and gladly interacts with his fans, he also encourages Wray to use the fans' devotion for material gain, such as to upgrade his flight from coach to first class.
- Ari Stidham as 1st class fan, a Spectrum fan. He reneges on an agreement to give his first-class plane seat to Wray if Wray signs multiple items, causing Wray to later refuse to return the fan's "lucky pen". The fan reveals this during a panel, foiling Wray's attempt to calm the enraged audience. He is among those who chase Wray.
- Felicia Day as Karen, Wray's enthusiastic assistant for the duration of the convention he attends in episodes two through four. She always dresses exactly as he does in case she needs to be his decoy, and because of this, he is able to escape an enraged group of fans.
- Nolan North as Jerry Lansing, a motion capture artist, second best after Andy Serkis, and self-proclaimed "mocap king". He reappears in "Voiced Over" recording voice-over work for a video game. The character was originally named Nigel Thrice; Jerry Lansing was a character originally created by North while he worked on the Uncharted series.
- Tricia Helfer as Louise, a woman attending a doll convention who treats her baby dolls as if they are real infants. Though Wray finds this behavior creepy, he becomes enamored with her and strives to gain her affection. Their short-lived relationship ends when Wray breaks her porcelain doll Isabelle in "Doll Faced".
- Leslie Jordan as himself, an actor. Though he is widely believed to be gay, he admits to Wray that he is pretending so that he can attract older politically conservative women through the "corrosive black lie" that sexuality is a choice. He becomes enamored with Bobbie, especially after she convinces him she is conservative.
- Sean Maher as himself, a gay actor who starred in the Firefly television series and the related film Serenity. He mistakenly believes Bobbie is male, then interprets Wray's correction as she is transgender, and becomes enamored with her and how "courageous" he perceives her to be.
- Alison Haislip as Faith, Jack Moore's new assistant who oversees his day to day schedule. As a fan of the original series Spectrum, she starts a flirty relationship with Wray although someone or something always seems to come between them.
- Liza Lapira as Brenda, an actress who played Dr. Chu on Spectrum.
- Henry Rollins as Stutter, an actor who played Hashen on Spectrum.
- Skyler Day as Tiffany, an actress who played Ketheria on Spectrum.
- Skylar Haarsma as Young Tiffany, during the time Spectrum was on the air.
- Amy Acker as Dawn, an actress who played Bree on Spectrum.
- Wil Wheaton as the Officer Cahoots, episode 1.
- Currie Graham as Emcee

== Episodes ==
Season	Episodes	Originally released	
Season	Episodes	First released	Last released
1	13	September 30, 2015	October 21, 2015
2	12	December 8, 2016	January 26, 2017

=== Season 1 (2015) ===
No. overall	No. in season	Title	Directed by	Written by	Original release date
1	1	"Stalled"	Alan Tudyk	Alan Tudyk	September 30, 2015
Wray Nerely flies to a weekend-long convention, and to his dismay, he is in coach. In the bathroom, he reluctantly signs a magazine cover featuring his Spectrum costar Jack Moore. He receives a call about a Clint Eastwood Western film, but because he cannot audition in person, he must send a taped audition instead. When Wray expresses discontent over fan interactions, Sean Astin (himself) encourages him to accept his status as beloved cult figure and use it to upgrade his seat. Astin's use of the word "retard" in the sense of "to impede or hinder" encourages Wray to say it. A Spectrum fan in first-class (Ari Stidham) reneges on the agreement to switch seats with Wray when Astin convinces another fan out of the adjacent seat. Wray is forced to his seat by the flight attendant (Samantha Smith) and Federal Air Marshal Cahoots (Wil Wheaton).
2	2	"Cash Poor"	Alan Tudyk	Alan Tudyk	September 30, 2015
The flight in coach gives Wray back pain. Bobbie (Mindy Sterling), Wray's booking agent, knows that he is auditioning for an Eastwood Western and offers to help him. He refuses her help and insists that no one is supposed to know about the project. He meets Karen (Felicia Day), a volunteer assigned to be his personal assistant for the duration of the convention. They quickly work through Wray's autograph line that he can rehearse the Eastwood script. Bobbie's loud insistence forces Wray to accept her help.
3	3	"Behind the Lines"	Alan Tudyk	Alan Tudyk	September 30, 2015
Bobbie's flawed character interpretation and overacting makes rehearsing difficult, and Wray tells her to leave. Jerry Lansing (Nolan North) gives Wray a painkiller for his back, though warns that it is potent with alcohol. Jack Moore (Nathan Fillion) calls Wray and expresses his regret over his canceled convention appearance and agrees to "put in a good word" with Eastwood. Wray, Jerry, and Astin meet fans at a VIP party. Despite the warning, Wray begins drinking and, taking Astin's revised advice to be himself, answers fan questions without tact. The meet and greet turns into a night of hard drinking and partying.
4	4	"Retarding It All Up"	Alan Tudyk	Alan Tudyk	September 30, 2015
The next morning, Wray learns he recorded and sent his audition tape during his alcohol and painkiller induced blackout. During his panel, he struggles to deflect questions about comments he made during the VIP party, including about the Eastwood film. His use of the word "retard" insults the audience, and his attempt to apologize worsens the situation. He distracts most of the crowd when Jack returns a phone call, but the disabled fans pursue him. Karen acts as a decoy, and he escapes. Astin reports that an online video of Wray talking about the film cost him the role. Wray gives Astin fan-made bourbon balls, which induce diarrhea, as payback for encouraging Wray to use the word "retard".
5	5	"Baby Boom"	Alan Tudyk	Alan Tudyk	October 7, 2015
Wray meets Louise (Tricia Helfer), who is attending the doll convention held alongside the science fiction convention. Though he is smitten with her, he finds it creepy that she treats her porcelain baby doll Isabelle as if it were real. However, Louise says she "adopted" the doll to help recover from the death of her son. Bobbie enters a cosplay contest judged by Wray, Leslie Jordan (himself), and Sean Maher (himself). Though she is initially upset that her sexy costume will not sway Leslie and Maher, who are both gay, in fact Leslie is pretending and Maher initially believes that she is male and misinterprets Wray's correction to mean Bobbie is transgender. The pair become enamoured with her.
6	6	"A Fluid Thing"	Alan Tudyk	Alan Tudyk	October 7, 2015
Bobbie agrees to meet Leslie and Maher at the hotel bar: Leslie at six and Maher at seven. Wray meets Ron Slackskin (Dileep Rao), who made an action figure of Wray as Cash Wayne that "slams" its fist down. Wray loves it with a fatherly affection and names it Wray Wray. At the Spectrum booth on the convention floor, Ron reports that all of the other Cash action figures sold out in an online pre-sale. A fan offers to buy Wray Wray at a premium, prompting Bobbie to start an auction. Louise witnesses this and disapproves. Wray refuses to sell Wray Wray and chases after Louise.
7	7	"Doll Faced"	Alan Tudyk	Alan Tudyk	October 7, 2015
Wray apologizes to Louise, and his compliments and his affection for Wray Wray lead her to reevaluate her opinion of him. She agrees to have dinner with Wray and Wray Wray. Bobbie's attempts to court Leslie and Maher separately backfires. The men scuffle at the bar, knocking Bobbie over, and she storms out. Wray's dinner with Louise starts well, and she trusts him to look after Isabelle while she goes to the bathroom. He is distracted by a call from Jack, and the doll slips out of its high chair and breaks. In her grief, Louise reveals that her son was a plastic doll. Wray tells her that she has never had real children, and she tells him that Wray Wray's motion feature looks like it is masturbating. Wray goes to Bobbie to have the action figure recalled, but she is busy having sex with Leslie and Maher.
8	8	"Voiced Over"	Alan Tudyk	Alan Tudyk	October 14, 2015
Wray, Jerry, and Milo Ventimiglia (himself) record voicework for an action video game. Because his voice "doesn't naturally convey strength", the voice director Grace (Gina Torres) has Wray voice Marion, a frightened and dying soldier. To prove he can sound "manly", he affects the voice of Rigamarole, a caricature of a black man he voiced in the racist cartoon Wassup, Bitch?, and he is kicked off the project. Jack, drunk, calls Wray and offers a film role because he misses working with Wray. He tells him to come over so they can talk about it. Milo asks Wray to appear at a comic book store opening that night in his place. Wray explains he cannot because he and Jack are making a movie, prompting Milo to ask if it is a Spectrum film. Wray explains it is not. Wray finally agrees to go upon learning it pays $5000.
9	9	"Sinking Feelings"	Alan Tudyk	Alan Tudyk	October 14, 2015
Wray visits Jack and finds only Jack's new assistant Faith (Alison Haislip) in the house. She tells him Jack is on his way to the airport and will call upon arriving in Las Vegas in half an hour. In the meantime, she invites Wray to play Marco Polo in the pool. As a reward for catching her, she tells him that Jack is planning to make a Spectrum movie with the original cast. Wray is devastated and tells her that he hates Spectrum. She encourages him to tell Jack, but Jack loves Spectrum more than anyone. Jack calls, and because Wray does not want to talk to Jack, he leaves to go to the store opening.
10	10	"Thank You for Your Service"	Alan Tudyk	Alan Tudyk	October 14, 2015
The comics store owner Casey Wingwall (Seth Green) has Wray, Michael Dorn (himself), and Kevin Grevioux (himself) sit on a panel about overcoming racist stereotypes and bigotry. Upon learning Michael and Kevin become murderously angry at racist stereotypes, Wray attempts to gloss over his work on Wassup, Bitch?, but Bobbie showcases samples of the characters. Because she does not have a voice sample of Rigamarole, Michael and Kevin force Wray to perform an excerpt of The Merchant of Venice in Rigamarole's voice. Wray's assistant Marion (J. Doc Farrow) helps Wray escape. Marion, a fan of Wassup, Bitch? because it helped him while he served as a Marine in Kabul, does not feel it racist and asks Wray to perform more lines. However, one line causes Marion to doubt his initial assessment. Wray escapes with Bobbie before Marion can open the door for Michael and Kevin.
11	11	"Full Release"	Alan Tudyk	Alan Tudyk	October 21, 2015
Wray has a stress dream with his former co-stars confronting him on the set of Spectrum, including Dawn (Amy Acker) with whom he has history & Stutter (Henry Rollins) who's still angry for "outing" him. He wakes to Jack (via phone) and Bobbie (surprisingly in person sitting at the foot of his bed, having broken into his apartment) telling him the incomplete "lost episode" of Spectrum has been released by the show's creator on Dutch television and is now available online. Jack has asked all the cast over for a reunion viewing party, but they decide to start watching the episode online with Dale (Jack Donner), Wray's drunk, elderly landlord & retired "stunt ladyman". Wray's laptop battery dies, so he decides to head over the Jack's, despite Bobbie and Dale's misgivings about him possibly hooking up with the now-married Dawn.
12	12	"Found and Lost"	Alan Tudyk	Alan Tudyk	October 21, 2015
Most of the Spectrum cast have reunited at Jack's to watch the "lost episode" which has been completed using animation, shadow puppets, and Dutch "lookalike" actors (James Gunn & Candice Patton) intercut with the existing but incomplete original footage. On the way to a meeting having bailed on the party at his own house, Jack video calls everyone to talk about doing a Spectrum movie. He's pulled over by a cop (Michael Trucco) who turns out to be a fan and lets him go after a photo op. Wray finally arrives, Stutter disappears leaving behind a threatening note, and Dawn starts to throw herself at Wray but is interrupted by Faith coming to Wray's rescue. They restart the show & then notice both Wray and Stutter are now missing and hear sounds of a struggle from another room.
13	13	"Too Much Closure for Comfort"	Alan Tudyk	Alan Tudyk	October 21, 2015
Stutter has Wray held captive in Jack's closet, confronting Wray as to why he outed him as a Republican. Faith once again steps in and rescues Wray. While trying to wash up after Stutter's spray cheese bomb goes off in his face, Wray has some uninvited one-on-one time some of the other reunion guests in Jack's bathroom. Brenda (Liza Lapira) tries to get him to say yes to the project so she can use the money to pay her debts from a sponsorship deal gone awry. Tiffany (Skyler Day) gives some unintentionally good advice. Dawn jumps Wray in Jack's bathtub. Meanwhile, Jack calls the party back and tells them that he has secured the rights and the Spectrum movie is a go.

=== Season 2 (2016–17) ===
No. overall	No. in season	Title	Directed by	Written by	Original release date
14	1	"What Goes up..."	Alan Tudyk	Alan Tudyk and Josh Dean	December 8, 2016
Jack Moore (Nathan Fillion) meets with his agents to find his movie career is on the rocks. Wray (Alan Tudyk) isn't sure how to tell Jack he's dating Faith (Alison Haislip), Jack's assistant.
15	2	"New deal, No deal"	Alan Tudyk	Alan Tudyk Sean Bury and Nicholas Daly Clark	December 8, 2016
Wray admits to Jack that he isn't interested in climbing back into the Spectrum cockpit. Jack promises Wray an audition for Doctor Cop Lawyer if he agrees to do the movie. Wray goes to negotiate with his agent (John Billingsley, Stephen Root, Jonathan Slavin) to get the role.
16	3	"Them's the Breaks"	Alan Tudyk	Alan Tudyk, Sean Bury and Nicholas Daly Clark	December 15, 2016
After firing his agents, Wray is forced to hire Bobbie (Mindy Sterling) to negotiate a cereal commercial on his behalf. Faith decides to get her sh*t in order wiith Jack and Ray.
17	4	"A Small Step for Manly"	Alan Tudyk	Alan Tudyk, Josh Dean	December 15, 2016
Wray shoots a commercial to impress the director of Doctor Cop Lawyer, Diego Alfonso (Jon Huertas). Against the warnings of the Stunt Coordinator (Tahmoh Penikett), Wray decides to perform his own stunts.
18	5	"Dick Lansing"	Jay Hunter	Alan Tudyk, Sean Bury and Nicholas Daly Clark	December 22, 2016
When Bobbie gets Wray the audition for the role of Dick Trimmings, he seeks the assistance of his old friend, the 2nd-best Mo-cap artist in the world, Jerry Lansing (Nolan North).
19	6	"Gum Drop"	Jay Hunter	Alan Tudyk, Sean Bury and Nicholas Daly Clark	December 22, 2016
It's a tough room at the auditions for Doctor Cop Lawyer: the casting director (Eliza Dushku) brings him in just before lunch, and Director Diego Alfonzo is video conferencing in with a poor connection.
20	7	"Pin Cushion"	Alan Tudyk	Alan Tudyk, Josh Dean	January 12, 2017
Wray heads to the Long Con to help build awareness for Spectrum: The Movie but ends up locked in the boiler room with Lou Ferrigno and start talking about staging a play.
21	8	"I'm with Stupid"	Alan Tudyk	Alan Tudyk, Josh Dean	January 12, 2017
The Long Con boiler room traps more and more participants of the convention, providing a cast composed of Leslie Jordan, Jerry, Karen and a Voice over guy (Tyler Labine) for Lou Ferrigno's new play Of Mice and Men: The Musical.
22	9	"Back to the Past"	Alan Tudyk	Alan Tudyk, Josh Dean	January 19, 2017
The cast of Spectrum reunites at Shock-A-Con and Jack asks Wray to keep an eye on them while he finishes securing financing for the Spectrum movie.
22	9	"Back to the Past"	Alan Tudyk	Alan Tudyk, Josh Dean	January 19, 2017
The cast of Spectrum reunites at Shock-A-Con, a sensational event hosted by Janet Carney (Riki Lindhome) and Rico Java (Josh Dean) and Jack asks Wray to keep an eye on them while he finishes securing financing for the Spectrum movie.
23	10	"Dawn of Girth"	Anthony Leonardi III	Alan Tudyk, Sean Bury and Nicholas Daly Clark	January 19, 2017
The gloves come off when the lost Hemsworth, Girth (Liam McIntyre), wanders out of the outback and into the running for the titular character in Doctor Cop Lawyer.
24	11	"A Shot with Finley"	Anthony Leonardi III	Alan Tudyk, Sean Bury and Nicholas Daly Clark	January 26, 2017
At the Ambivalence - the Uprising party, Wray is torn between supervising the cast of Spectrum and impressing Finley Farrow (Laura Vandervoort) to become the Doctor Cop Lawyer.
25	12	"Shock to the System"	Anthony Leonardi III	Alan Tudyk, Josh Dean	January 26, 2017
Girth Hemsworth and Wray compete for the role of Dr. Officer Blade Slater, Esq at Shock-A-Con. The cast is reunited on stage to officially announce the return of Spectrum.

== Production ==
=== Conception and development ===
Tudyk developed the series based on his experiences as an actor touring the science fiction convention circuit. Though it is not autobiographical, the fictional Spectrum echoes Firefly, a canceled science fiction series-turned-cult hit that starred Tudyk as a pilot and Fillion as a captain, and Wray's experiences draw heavily on incidents and people Tudyk and Fillion encountered at conventions. Spectrum is based on a prequel novel to The Softwire series currently being written by PJ Haarsma, who is also a producer of Con Man.

Tudyk said in March 2015 that the concept had been in development for two years. He pitched the idea to a production company, which became interested in producing the series and began to draw up contracts. However, the company's funder left the company, and the series was dropped. Tudyk spent a year meeting with producers but was disappointed. When asked to find an audience beyond "weird convention nerds," he refused, believing it to be compromising the concept of Con Man and disrespecting fans.

The series premiered on September 30, 2015, on Vimeo, with the first season consisting of 13 episodes. The second season premiered on December 8, 2016, on Comic-Con HQ, Comic-Con's subscription streaming video service, consisted of 12 episodes, and concluded on January 26, 2017.

In July 2017, the series was acquired by Syfy and had its television debut on September 9, 2017. The web series was shown as is but the episodes were combined to produce half-hour installments for airing, with all thirteen episodes of the first season aired back-to-back on the night. If the reception of the television network broadcast goes well and viewer ratings are sufficient, the network may decide to fund future seasons.

=== Crowdfunding campaign ===
On March 10, 2015, Tudyk, Fillion, and Haarsma launched a campaign to raise funds for the series on crowdfunding website Indiegogo with a target goal of $425,000 to produce three ten-minute episodes. In 24 hours, the campaign raised over $1 million, setting a one-day record for a crowdfunded web series. In 35 hours, it raised over $1.4 million, breaking the overall web series crowdfunding record set by the campaign for TableTop's Season Three. The campaign set a stretch goal of $1.75 million to produce a full season of 12 episodes, as Tudyk planned, plus a "lost" episode of the fictional Spectrum. The goal was met on March 14, 2015. The campaign closed on April 10, 2015, with $3,124,214.

The decision to use crowdfunding came out of Tudyk and Fillion's desire to work with people who knew the world of conventions, would enjoy being involved, and did not disrespect fans and their world. Tudyk said, "It's something that just made sense. This world of Cons, of the sci-fi conventions, is built by the fans." Fillion said, "This project in the hands of the fans is the only place it will be safe."

=== Casting ===
The launch of crowdfunding campaign announced that it would be drawing from talent in science fiction and named several guest stars: Seth Green, Felicia Day, James Gunn, Gina Torres, Sean Maher, and Amy Acker. Later, Tricia Helfer, Michael Trucco, Nolan North, Emily Kinney, Robert Patrick, Mindy Sterling, and Samantha Smith were announced as cast members. However, Kinney later left the project because filming dates conflicted with her musical tour. Though the crew thought they would be "begging for favors" to cast the series, the successful Indiegogo campaign attracted interest from actors, including William Shatner, and the crew was surprised by the willingness to take small parts. Fillion noted, "We ran out of parts before we ran out of people for the parts." Tudyk stated that some actors appear as fictionalized versions of themselves because "they are a part of that world." In June 2016, it was announced that Eliza Dushku had been cast for the second season.

=== Filming ===
Principal photography for the first season ran over a 23-day period from June 1 to 30, 2015, in Los Angeles. The set was located at Laurel Canyon Stages in Arleta, Los Angeles. Some crowd scenes were shot at MegaCon 2015 in Orlando, Florida on April 10. Some scenes were shot at Long Beach Convention and Entertainment Center in Los Angeles, California between June 16 and 19, 2015.

== Awards ==
The series received two 2017 Emmy Award nominations: Alan Tudyk for Outstanding Actor in a Short Form Comedy or Drama Series and Mindy Sterling for Outstanding Actress in a Short Form Comedy or Drama Series.
