= Ian Nelson (actor, born 1982) =

American actor (born 1982)

- Born: Ian Paul Nelson; September 5, 1982 (age 42); Madison, Wisconsin, U.S.
- Occupation: Actor
- Years active: 2001–present
- Spouse: Skyler Day (m. 2017)
- Children: 1
- Relatives: Dalton Day (brother-in-law)

Ian Paul Nelson (born September 5, 1982) is an American actor. He is best known for his roles as Brian in Keith and Brady Carter in What Goes On.

== Personal life ==
Ian is the founder and executive producer of Bubba's Chop Shop, an award-winning post-production studio located in Burbank, California.

Nelson and actress/singer Skyler Day announced their engagement on December 11, 2015. Nelson and Day married in Camarillo, California on September 30, 2017. The couple had their first child in December 2024.

== Filmography ==
=== Film ===
Year	Film	Role	Notes
2001	The Ketchup Conspiracy	Street Passerby #3 / Rollerblade Kid	Short film
2003	Natural Selection	Angelo	Short film
2006	Heavens Fall	Lester Carter	
2007	Bratz	Dylan	
2008	Dakota Skye	Jonah	
2008	Keith	Brian	
2008	Legacy	James	Direct to video; also known as Pretty Little Devils
2012	K-11	Rookie Harris	
2013	All I Want for Christmas	Ian	
2014	Barefoot	Jerry	
2015	Lure	Boyfriend	Short film

=== Television ===
Year	TV series	Role	Notes
2002	Home of the Brave	Randy	Television film
2004	Cold Case	Gary Cardiff	Episode: "Resolutions"
2004	7th Heaven	Monty	Episodes: "Vote" & "Why Not Me?"
2007	What Goes On	Brady Carter	Recurring role, 10 episodes (main role)
2008	Ghost Whisperer	Bruce Waters	Episode: "Horror Show"
2008	True Confessions of a Hollywood Starlet	Eli Walsh	Television film
2008	Private Practice	Kirk Jensen	Episode: "Equal & Opposite"
2010	Night and Day	Eric Graham	Television film
2010	Castle	Troy Kenworth	Episode: "Punked"
2011	NCIS: Los Angeles	Patrick Quade	Episode: "Higher Power"
