= True Confessions of a Hollywood Starlet =

- DVD cover
- Based on: True Confessions of a Hollywood Starlet by Lola Douglas
- Screenplay by: Elisa Bell
- Directed by: Tim Matheson
- Starring: Joanna "JoJo" Levesque; Valerie Bertinelli; Lynda Boyd; Shenae Grimes; Leah Cudmore; Ian Nelson
- Country of origin: United States
- Original language: English

Production
- Producer: Mark Winemaker
- Cinematography: David Herrington
- Editor: Charles Bornstein
- Running time: 87 minutes
- Production company: Starlet Productions

Original release
- Network: Lifetime
- Release: August 9, 2008

True Confessions of a Hollywood Starlet is a 2008 American comedy-drama television film directed by Tim Matheson, based on the young adult novel of the same name by author Lola Douglas. The film stars Joanna "JoJo" Levesque and Valerie Bertinelli. It premiered on August 9, 2008, on Lifetime.

== Plot ==
Teenage actress Morgan Carter is a Hollywood princess, until the day that her hard-partying ways get the best of her. After she collapses outside of a Hollywood nightclub, Morgan's mother sends her to live in the wilds of Fort Wayne, Indiana, with her Aunt Trudy. Morgan is camouflaged into Claudia Miller and given a new hairstyle, and suddenly, Morgan, albeit unwillingly, blends in with her peers who do not own televisions or read magazines.

With a new appearance and no money, Morgan enters a suburban high school with a bad attitude. She initially does not fit in with anyone, until she meets Eli and they became friends. Eli introduces Claudia to his sister and her friends. Morgan takes a liking to Emily, Eli's sister, and they become good friends. Emily invites Morgan to a sleepover where Debbie, who likes Eli, tells her to stay away from him. Morgan is upset so she leaves early, without telling Emily. When she gets home, she calls her mother for help. Instead of her mother, she gets her new stepfather on the phone. He just happens to be her manager, Sam. After this discovery she comes to the misguided theory that Sam wanted her to leave Hollywood so he could marry her mom. Soon she drinks a bottle of vodka that she found in the cupboard. The next day when Eli comes over to tutor Morgan and she, wanting desperately to capture Eli's attention, makes up a story about her father, borrowing a plot from one of her movies. Eli is worried, as Morgan drastically exaggerated and added several negative details about her supposed "father", telling Morgan to alert him if he shows up. Eli asks Morgan on a date (partly out of pity) to the fair and she happily accepts. Morgan's best friend from when she was in Hollywood, Marissa, comes to visit her in Indiana, where they go to a club. Morgan goes to the fair with Eli and Morgan begins liking him more. Everything was going great until Debbie tries to blackmail Morgan. The paparazzi finds out where she is and leak the story so she sneaks to Eli's house to apologize for lying, both about her father and about not being Claudia. Eli is upset at the deception, but in the end he forgives her and they drive away on his motorcycle.

== Pop culture references ==
The film makes references to several teen films, television dramas, and reality shows such as Mean Girls, Die Hard, Legally Blonde, Bring it On, Monster Garage, The Surreal Life, and Grey's Anatomy. Also referenced in the film are Lindsay Lohan, Perez Hilton, Britney Spears, Sarah Michelle Gellar and Oscar-winning directors Steven Spielberg, Quentin Tarantino and Steven Soderbergh. The soundtrack featured songs like "Bubbly" by Colbie Caillat, "SOS" by Rihanna, "Funplex" by The B-52's and "My World" by Emigrate.

== Cast ==
- Joanna "JoJo" Levesque as Morgan Carter/Claudia Miller
- Ian Nelson as Eli Walsh
- Justin Louis as Sam
- Lynda Boyd as Bianca
- Shenae Grimes as Marissa Dahl
- Jennifer Miller as Bully
- Melanie Leishman as Emily
- Leah Cudmore as Debbie
- Valerie Bertinelli as Aunt Trudy
- Dayna Devon as Herself
- Jonathan Higgins as Mr. Sappey
- Jonathan Potts as Principal Bowman
- Zain Meghji as Lux Movie Host
- Victoria Snow as Gaby
- Mary Kitchen as Local Reporter
- Bill Turnbull as Dan
- Rebecca Amare as Bethany
- Mike 'Nug' Nahrgang as Stan
- Araxi Arslanian as Cashier
- Dan Duran as Dave
- Kathryn Haggis as Lisa

== Release dates ==
Date	Region
March 3, 2009	United States
March 3, 2009	Canada
March 4, 2009	Netherlands
March 25, 2009	Portugal
April 21, 2009	France
June 28, 2009	Sweden
