= Redemption Maddie =

- Film poster
- Directed by: Aaron Drew King
- Written by: Rachel Morrison; Aaron Drew King; Harry Maxon
- Produced by: Yoshi Tsuji
- Starring: Allison Scagliotti
- Cinematography: Rachel Morrison
- Edited by: Michael Darrow
- Music by: Kristin Øhrn Dyrud
- Distributed by: American Film Institute
- Release date: February 4, 2007
- Running time: 25 minutes
- Country: United States
- Language: English

Redemption Maddie is a 2007 short film directed by Aaron King and stars Allison Scagliotti. The film was completed as part of the American Film Institute Conservatory's MFA Program.

The film began touring the festival circuit in 2007, premiering at the 22nd Annual Santa Barbara International Film Festival. It has won several awards including a Grand Jury Prize for Student Shorts at the AFI Dallas International Film Festival, Best Short Film and Best Actress at BendFilm Festival, and Best Screenplay at the Hollyshorts Film Festival. After completing its festival run, Maddie was distributed by Reframe and Amazon for DVD and digital purchase.

The film's official website provides the following description

"In the wake of tragedy, 14 year old Maddie Clifford employs manipulation, insulin syringes, and an ill-fated rabbit in a startling quest for redemption."

The synopsis highlights an aspect of the film's plot which revolves around the so-called rabbit test, a practice employed to detect pregnancy used in the early twentieth century.

== Cast ==
- Allison Scagliotti as Maddie Clifford
- Kevin Montgomery as Tyler
- Michael Catlin as Mr. Clifford
- Peggy Goss as Mrs. Clifford
- Christopher Dobler as James
- Gisselle Castellanos as Classmate Girl #1
- Jay Collette as Neighbor boy
- Paige Cooper as Nurse Fisher
- Skyler Day as Classmate Girl #2
- Gabi DuBay as Maddie's Classmate
- Kennis Frommel as Baby
- Bella Frommell as Baby
- Chandler M. Guidroz as Doctor
- Steve Humphreys as Mr. Dacey
- Barry Alan Levine as Pet Store Pete
- Stephen Markarian as Henry
- Timothy Mittel as Carl
- Matthew Moseley as Chris
- Judi Rosen Sacks as Nurse
- Alexandria M. Salling as Young Maddie
- Dalton Smith as Winston
- Jennifer Winters as New Wife
