= The Adventures of Ociee Nash =

2003 film by Kristen McGary

- Theatrical release poster
- Directed by: Kristen McGary
- Screenplay by: Amy McGary; Kristen McGary
- Based on: A Flower Blooms on Charlotte Street by Milam McGraw Propst
- Produced by: Derek Kavanagh
- Starring: Keith Carradine; Mare Winningham; Skyler Day
- Cinematography: Brian Gunter
- Edited by: Amy Carey Linton
- Music by: Van Dyke Parks
- Production company: CineVita Productions
- Distributed by: Flying Zebra Films Inc.
- Release date: June 1, 2003 (Coca-Cola Summer Film Festival)
- Running time: 87 minutes
- Country: United States
- Language: English

The Adventures of Ociee Nash is a 2003 American adventure drama film directed by Kristen McGary and starring Keith Carradine, Mare Winningham and Skyler Day.

== Cast ==
- Keith Carradine as Papa George Nash
- Mare Winningham as Aunt Mamie Nash
- Skyler Day as Ociee Nash
- Ty Pennington as Wilbur Wright
- Tom Key as Mr. Lynch
- Janice Akers as Frances Murphy
- Bill Butler as Ben Nash
- Jasmine Sky as Elizabeth Murphy
- Anthony P. Rodriguez as Gypsy John Leon
- John Lawhorn as Conductor John Charles
- Lucas Till as Harry Vanderbilt
- Charles Nuckols IV as Fred Nash
- Donna Wright as Nellie Bly
- Sean Daniels as Orville Wright
- Daniel Burnley as President William McKinley
- Dalton Day as Boy at Creek

== Reception ==
Joly Herman of Common Sense Media awarded the film four stars out of five.
