= Allison Scagliotti =

American actress and musician (born 1990)

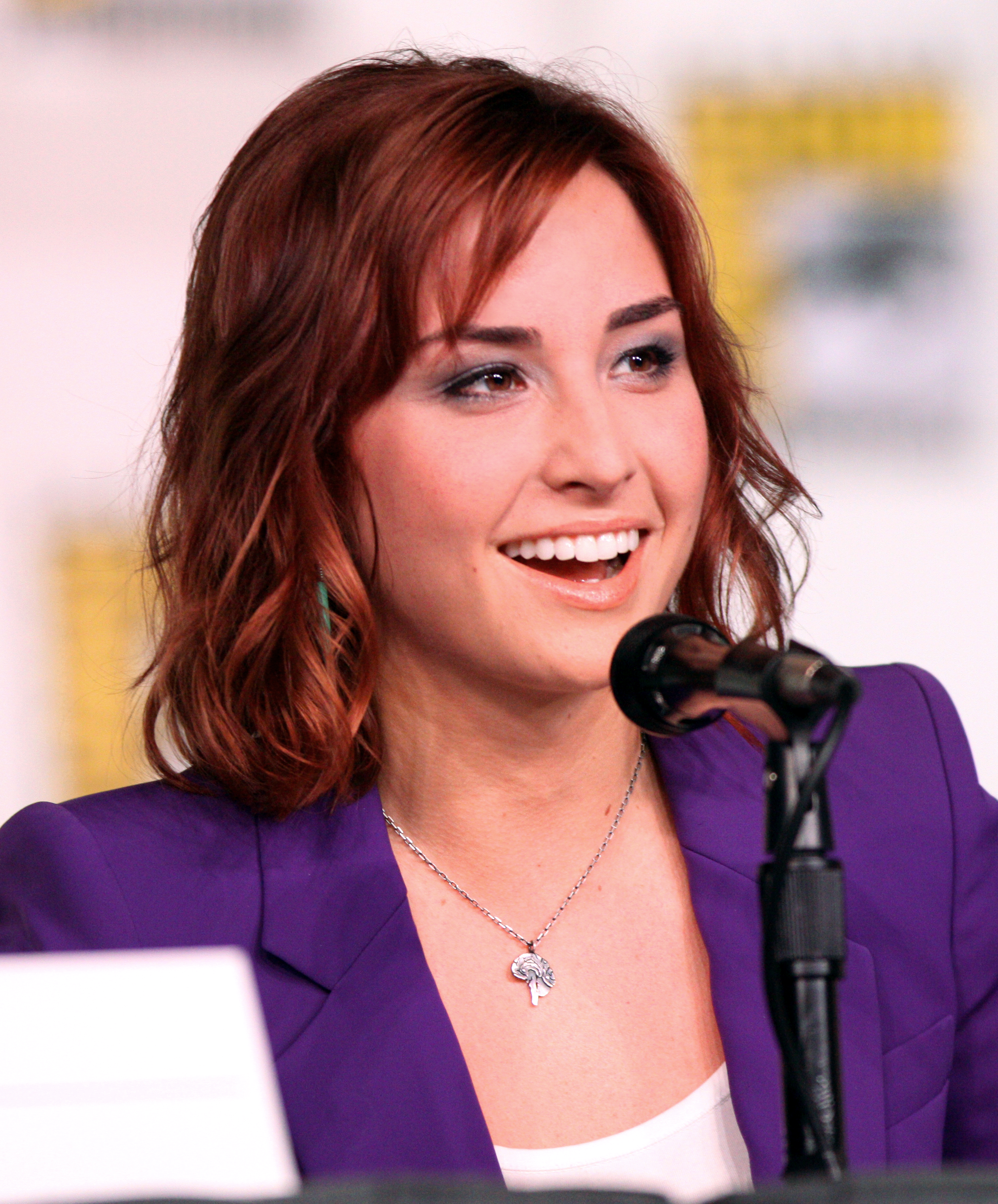
- Allison Scagliotti in 2012
- Born: September 21, 1990 (age 35)
- Other name: La Femme Pendu
- Education: Berklee College of Music; New York University
- Occupations: Actress; director; musician
- Years active: 2002–present

Allison Scagliotti (/ˌskæliˈoʊti/ SKAL-ee-OH-tee; born September 21, 1990) is an American actress, musician and director. Her television roles include appearing in Drake & Josh, Warehouse 13, and Stitchers. She performs as a musician under the name La Femme Pendu (French for 'The Hanged Woman').

== Early life ==
Scagliotti's great-grandparents emigrated to the United States from Italy through Ellis Island. She moved with her family to Mandeville, Louisiana at a young age. At age five, she joined her Louisiana school's, Tchefuncte Middle School, talent and drama program.

When Scagliotti was 11, she was working with an acting coach who encouraged her to try auditioning for pilot season in Los Angeles. She booked a pilot for a sitcom with Chevy Chase which was filmed in New York. Scagliotti moved to Los Angeles for her acting career.

Scagliotti studied film at New York University, though she never finished her degree. She later obtained a bachelor's degree in Interdisciplinary Music Studies through Berklee College of Music's online program. She is the first cousin of Kevin Pfeffer, the lead singer of Five Minutes to Freedom, and Alex Scagliotti, National Wakeboard Champion.

== Career ==
Scagliotti's small television roles include One Tree Hill, CSI, and the Nickelodeon series Zoey 101.

Scagliotti landed her first recurring role as Mindy Crenshaw on Drake & Josh, Josh's rival and later girlfriend. She appeared in eight episodes from 2004 to 2007. She reprised her role in the spin-off movie, Merry Christmas, Drake & Josh. Her first lead role was as Maddie in the 2005 short film Redemption Maddie.

She appeared as Jayna, the female Wonder Twin, in the episode "Idol" in the ninth season of Smallville in 2009. She helped co-host SyFy's Ghost Hunters Live on Halloween 2010.

Scagliotti portrayed the character Claudia Donovan in the Syfy series Warehouse 13. Her character was introduced early in the premiere season in 2009 and she appeared in most of the remaining episodes through 2014 (though credited as a guest star until season two). Her character crossed over to Eureka when she guest-starred in the season four episode "Crossing Over".

She appeared in the 2011 indie film Losers Take All, set in the 1980s rock music scene.

In December 2012, Scagliotti appeared in the lead role of Michelle, a struggling actress, in Darren Caulley's play Unhealthy that premiered December 4 at HERE Arts Center in New York City. She appeared in the three seasons of Freeform's Stitchers as Camille, a main character, from 2015 to 2017. Scagliotti also appeared in the series The Vampire Diaries as Georgie in a recurring role during the show's eighth and final season in 2016.

== Other work ==
In 2014, Scagliotti joined the advisory board of Sci-Fest LA, the first annual Los Angeles Science Fiction One-Act Play Festival, held in May 2014.

From 2015 to 2018, Scagliotti was in the band Nice Enough People along with Drake and Josh co-star Jerry Trainor. In 2016, she appeared as a guitar player in the music video "Some Are Girls" for Maxie Dean.

=== La Femme Pendu ===
On June 21, 2019, Scagliotti released her first solo EP, All Them Witches, under the pseudonym La Femme Pendu. Scagliotti's first album, Absolute Horror, was released on May 1, 2020. It was followed by three EPs that same year, Bonne anniversaire a moi, The Legend of the River King, and Les Ballet Tragiques. Her second full-length album, VAMPYR, was released on October 22, 2021, and featured a guest appearance by vocalist Damien Moyal. Scagliotti next provided guest vocals to Moyal's band Damien Done's song "Bounty and Blight", which was released as a single on April 21, 2023.

== Appearances ==
Scagliotti appeared in a 2010 episode of The Nerdist Podcast hosted by Chris Hardwick. She also appeared as a guest star on Geek & Sundry's TableTop in 2013, hosted by Wil Wheaton, and as a guest on the show Destination Truth in 2010 and 2011.

== Filmography ==
=== Film ===
| Year | Title | Role | Notes |
|---|---|---|---|
| 2007 | Redemption Maddie | Maddie Clifford | Short film |
| 2009 | Endless Bummer | Iris | |
| 2009 | My Name Is Jerry | Trisha | |
| 2011 | Losers Take All | Simone | |
| 2013 | Chastity Bites | Leah | |
| 2014 | National Lampoon Presents: Surf Party | Iris | Repackage of Endless Bummer (2009) |
| 2015 | Anne Darling | Maggie | Short film |
| 2016 | Pillowcase | Pillowcase | Short film |
| 2016 | A Song for Your Mixtape | Blair | Short film |
| 2018 | Little Gold Star | Diane | Short film |
| 2018 | The Cards | The High Priestess | Short film; Director, Writer |
| 2018 | Truly Outrageous: A Jem Fan Film | The Reporter/The Baroness | Short film |
| 2019 | I Was Wrong | N/A | Director (Music Video for W. Baer) |

=== Television ===
| Year | Title | Role | Notes |
|---|---|---|---|
| 2002 | America's Most Terrible Things | Molly Potts | TV film |
| 2003 | Once Around the Park | Rose Wingfield | TV film |
| 2004 | Joint Custody | Meg | TV film |
| 2004 | Grounded for Life | Kristen | Episodes: "Racketman", "You're So Vain" |
| 2004 | Back When We Were Grownups | Emmy | TV film |
| 2004–2007 | Drake & Josh | Mindy Crenshaw | Recurring role (8 episodes) |
| 2005 | Zoey 101 | Stacy | Episode: "Backpack" |
| 2006 | Read It and Weep | Sawyer Sullivan | TV film |
| 2006 | ER | Josie Weller | Episode: "Heart of the Matter" |
| 2006-2007 | One Tree Hill | Abby Brown | Episodes: "With Tired Eyes, Tired Minds, Tired Souls, We Slept", “You Call It Madness, But I Call It Love”, “The Runway Found”. |
| 2008 | Gemini Division | Hera Theophilus | Recurring role (4 episodes) |
| 2008 | Merry Christmas, Drake & Josh | Mindy Crenshaw | TV film |
| 2009 | CSI: Crime Scene Investigation | Jemma | Episode: "Deep Fried and Minty Fresh" |
| 2009 | Party Down | Taylor Stiltskin | Episode: "Taylor Stiltskin Sweet Sixteen" |
| 2009 | Mental | Heather Masters | Episode: "House of Mirrors" |
| 2009 | Smallville | Jayna | Episode: "Idol" |
| 2009–2014 | Warehouse 13 | Claudia Donovan | Main role (60 episodes) |
| 2010 | Eureka | Claudia Donovan | Episode: "Crossing Over" |
| 2013 | Bones | Jill Roberts | Episode: "The Maiden in the Mushrooms" |
| 2013 | Person of Interest | Molly Nelson | Episode: "In Extremis" |
| 2013 | Switched at Birth | Aida Adams | Episodes: "The Physical Impossibility of Death in the Mind of Someone Living", "As the Shadows Deepen" |
| 2015–2017 | Stitchers | Camille Engelson | Main role; 31 episodes |
| 2016 | Fresh Off the Boat | Raquel | Episode: "Rent Day" |
| 2016 | The Vampire Diaries | Georgina "Georgie" Dowling | Recurring role (4 episodes) |
| 2016 | Mary + Jane | Tasha | Episode: "Neighborhood Watch" |
| 2018-2019 | Henry Danger | N/A | Director (5 episodes; "Henry's Frittle Problem", "The Great Cactus Con", "The Whole Bilsky Family", "Love Bytes", "A Tale of Two Pipers") |
| 2018 | Take One Thing Off | Scout's Inner Voice | Web Series; Episode: "Palm Trees" |
| 2018 | Spellslingers | Herself | Web Series |
| 2021 | Just Roll with It | N/A | Director (2 episodes; "Just Reminisce With It!", "Warlock World: War of the Warlocks") |
| 2022 | The Rookie: Feds | Aria | Episode: "Felicia" |
| 2023 | That Girl Lay Lay | Bri Wiggin | Episode: "The Packer Packer Bowl" |
| 2023 | Raven's Home | Event Coordinator | Episode: "Raven's Clone" |
| 2024 | Hysteria! | Officer Olsen | |

== Theater performances ==
Play
| Year | Title | Role | Notes |
|---|---|---|---|
| 2012 | Unhealthy | Michelle | Lead role, HERE Theatre |
| 2014 | Jasper in Deadland | Gretchen | Lead role, Off-Broadway Musical |
