= PJ Haarsma =

Novelist, children's literature (born 1964)

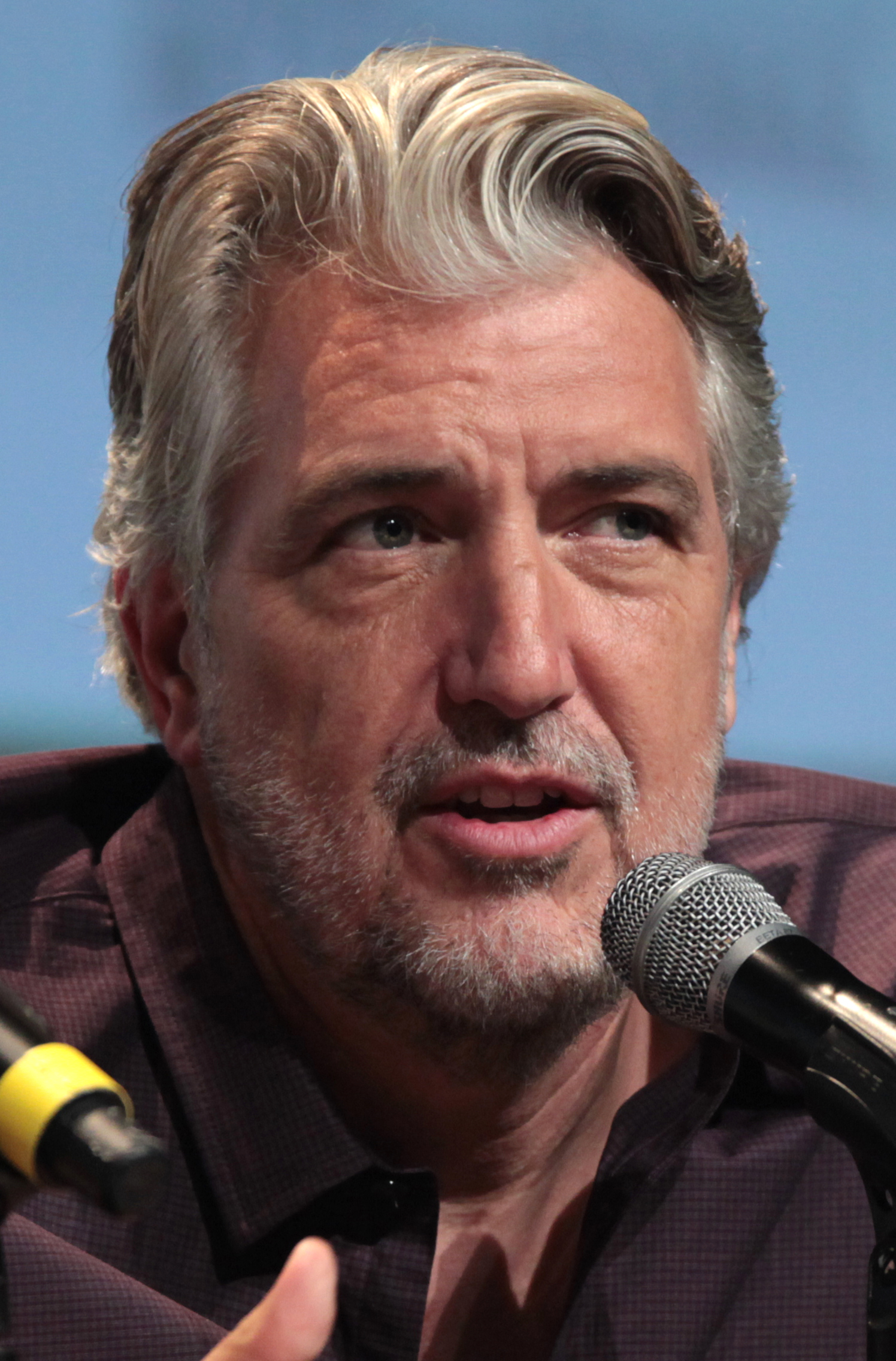
- PJ Haarsma at the 2015 Comic Con
- Born: Philip-Jon Haarsma; June 5, 1964 (age 62); Georgetown, Ontario, Canada
- Citizenship: Canada, United States
- Occupations: Producer, novelist
- Spouse: Marisa Grieco
- Children: 2
- Writing career
- Period: 2004–present
- Genre: Young adult science fiction
- Notable works: The Softwire Series: Virus on Orbis 1 Betrayal on Orbis 2 Wormhole Pirates on Orbis 3 Awakening on Orbis 4
- Notable awards: ABC New Voices in Children's Literature Award; 2008 The Softwire – Author; Emmy Awards; 2021 UCI Health commercial "Journey" – Producer
- Website: www.pjhaarsma.com

Philip-Jon Haarsma /ˈhɑːrzmɑː/ (born June 5, 1964), more commonly known as PJ Haarsma, is a Canadian-born producer and science fiction author best known for his creation of the Rings of Orbis universe, which encompasses The Softwire series of books. Haarsma created a free, online role-playing game, also called the Rings of Orbis, set in the same universe. Both the book-series and the game target young, often reluctant readers in an attempt to encourage them by rewarding them for reading. He is also the founder and CEO of Redbear Films, a production company that focuses on advertisements.

Haarsma developed a school presentation program in which he discusses The Softwire books, astronomy, and other science fiction and science fact topics. He is also one of the co-founders of Kids Need to Read, a United States Internal Revenue Code 501(c)(3) tax exempt public charity that purchases books to donate to underfunded schools and libraries.

Haarsma, along with Redbear Films colleagues Andre Marcel and Drew Lewis, received a regional Emmy in 2021 for the commercial "Journey" for UCI Health.

== Personal life ==
Philip-Jon Haarsma was born on June 5, 1964, in Georgetown, Ontario. Though he was named after his grandfathers, Philip and Jon, he went simply by "Jon" while growing up. Later, while attending McMaster University in Hamilton, Ontario, where he received a Bachelor of Science degree, he began to use his initials, "PJ", and his books are published under the name "PJ Haarsma".

After he moved to the United States in 1989, Haarsma worked as a fashion and commercial photographer in New York City and Miami. He received many photography awards, including an honorable mention at the Cannes Lion Awards in 1996. Haarsma owns a production company called Redbear Films, Inc. The company produced one movie (Devious Beings, 2002), and a digital series called Con Man starring Alan Tudyk and Nathan Fillion and several corporate ads for clients such as Hewlett-Packard and Nokia. For 15 years, Redbear Films focused on the production of advertisements.

Haarsma lives in Los Angeles with his wife, sci-fi fantasy artist and host of Your Mystical Guide, Marisa Grieco, and their daughters Skylar and Zoe.

== Con Man (digital series) ==
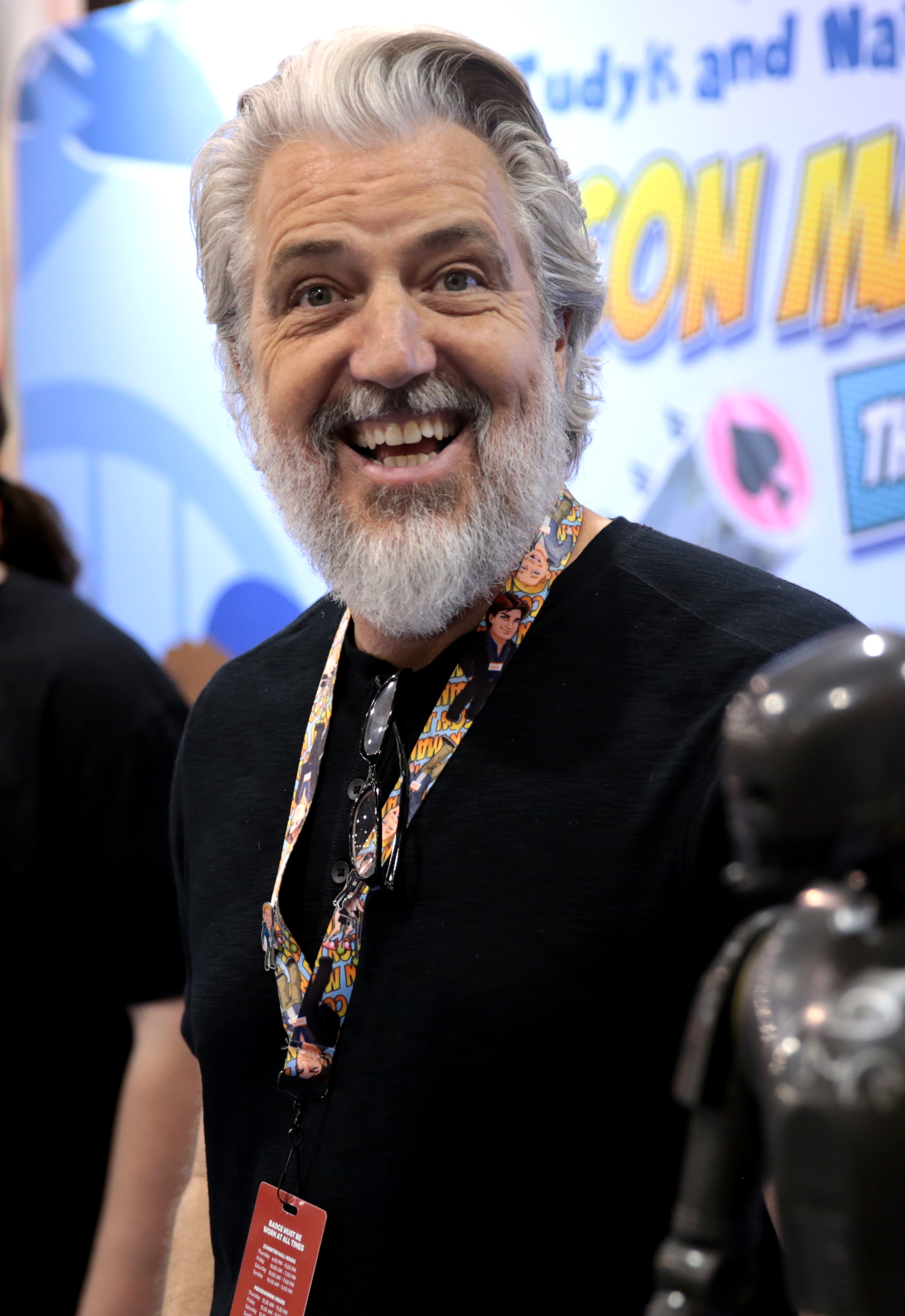
Haarsma at the 2017 Phoenix Comicon, promoting Con Man

PJ Haarsma is the producer and show-runner of the SyFy series, Con Man created by Alan Tudyk and co-produced by Nathan Fillion. The series ended on its second season and is available on the Prime Video. PJ Haarsma set up the Con Man series at Lionsgate with executive, Seth Laderman.

PJ Haarsma crowdfunded the first series of Con Man, setting records through Indiegogo. Haarsma produced the first season with a 23-day shooting schedule. As a 30-year production veteran, Haarsma sees little difference producing a web series over films, TV, or advertising. This series operated under SAG New Media and IATSE contracts, and crew members came from projects like Interstellar, Lord of the Rings, and TV's Agents of S.H.I.E.L.D.

From the Fast Company Article: “The deliverables are the only thing that’s different. Every other aspect is the same—getting the story, keeping the budget in line, creating a fun set, and keeping people from getting crazy,” says Haarsma. “For a producer, the biggest thing is knowing everyone else’s job to make sure everything’s moving properly, anticipate what could go wrong, and having a tool chest to be able to solve it. ”

== Rings of Orbis ==
At the age of 38, Haarsma was not satisfied with his professional life. He began to keep a daily journal, writing about anything (and everything) that came to his mind—until eventually "Johnny T came onto [his] page." Johnny T is the main character, Johnny Turnbull, of Haarsma's The Softwire series. Haarsma chose to give The Softwire a sci-fi setting due to a love of science fiction, and to target a young adult audience with his novels so that children could discover and learn to enjoy the genre.

The Softwire is actually a story that Haarsma began imagining in his childhood. As a teenager, he worked at his parents' ceramic factory during the summers, hauling fifty pound molds around in the extreme heat of a kiln room. To Haarsma, it felt similar to what the children of his books might feel as slaves. In addition to these experiences, there is a more prominent influence on the premise of The Softwire—that is, there is a mystery of a journey to a new, unknown place to start a new life. Growing up, Haarsma dreamed of moving to the United States; and in his twenties, he actually did. While there, living in New York, Miami, San Francisco and Los Angeles, Haarsma witnessed immigrants struggling to get by. He tried to imagine what caused them to risk everything, and to move to another country, and to have a chance at something better. It is this journey (and struggle) that is prevalent in The Softwire.

In The Softwire, a group of human children are orphaned in outer space. They are forced into indentured servitude on the Rings of Orbis, four planet-like rings around a wormhole. They must spend four years as slaves or knudniks before they are eligible to become Citizens. Each year they are the property of a new owner on a separate ring: Orbis 1, Orbis 2, Orbis 3, and Orbis 4. They are forced into labor to do whatever task their new owner requires.

For me, The Softwire, when I was writing it, I was really thinking about a lot of the questions I thought about as I was growing up, that I've always had. One of them was "Why are we here?" Another one is "Why are we staying here?"

— PJ Haarsma, IGN Interview

When the children arrive, they soon discover that thirteen-year-old Johnny Turnbull (JT), is the first human softwire, a boy who has the ability to enter any computer with just his mind. To the older Citizens, a slave who can enter at will the massive computer which controls the Rings of Orbis makes JT very valuable and drives the Rings to the brink of war. As the central computer begins to malfunction, the Citizens connive, conspire, and even kill to own JT and his sister.

While there are other humans besides the children on the Rings, the majority of the inhabitants are of alien species. The Keepers are an intelligent species of two-headed beings who act as the overseers. Other species encountered include Belarans, Choi, Solinns, and Trefaldoors, all of which become interesting roles for young players to choose from in the game, Rings of Orbis.

=== Rings of Orbis game ===
Haarsma's novels are accompanied by a free, online, role-playing game called Rings of Orbis which acts as a visual companion to the books and is set in the same universe. Players are sometimes required to use information from the books in order to solve puzzles and to unlock areas within the game. Pairing a video game with a novel for young readers, Haarsma says, “brings the book into their world, as opposed to going the other way around.”

Haarsma and a team of artists also created many different alien races specifically for the game. The team includes Haarsma's wife Marisa Grieco, Igor Knezevic, Stephan Martinière, Dwayne Harris, and Neil Blevins.

The game works to encourage reluctant readers, especially boys, by giving them an interactive game through which to relate to the mysteries found within the books themselves. Players complete quests and earn in-game currency which they can then spend on in-game items designed by Haarsma, all the while they compete to become the best Citizen of the Rings of Orbis. In 2008, the game was featured in a front page New York Times article about encouraging reluctant readers with video games.

== Promotion of literacy ==
=== Kids Need to Read ===
While speaking at schools across the United States, Haarsma noticed how some school librarians were having trouble finding funds to purchase The Softwire books after a demand had been created by Haarsma's visit. Many of the librarians were struggling to fill their shelves with books. In June 2007, Haarsma and a friend, actor Nathan Fillion, approached a group of Fillion's fans with the idea for a project that would work to purchase books for underfunded schools, as well as nonprofit institutions which gave books directly to children. The group took to the idea and focused their energies into getting the project off the ground. The Kids Need to Read project went public in August 2007.

In January 2008, the process to transform the project into a legal foundation began, and the fan group was separated from the developing organization. On May 22, 2008, The Kids Need to Read Foundation (KNTR) was incorporated in the state of California.

Funds were initially raised through eBay auctions of Firefly and Serenity autographed memorabilia, and The Softwire books and items, and other science fiction and literary themed items. Fundraising efforts have since expanded and all funds are used to purchase books from the foundation's official book list, a list which is continually updated by a professional children's book buyer. The titles chosen are well-reviewed and many are recommended for children who are reluctant readers.

KNTR has made book donations to forty-one schools and libraries in addition to three multiple library systems. KNTR facilitated a substantial donation of three thousand books by the Phoenix Book Company to the Friends of the New Orleans Public Library, to help with recuperation after Hurricane Katrina. The Odessa Brown Children's Clinic in Seattle was the recipient of a donation amounting to four hundred forty books in February 2008. This clinic, as well as the North Public Health Clinic in Seattle, have received recurring donations from KNTR.

Haarsma remains on the KNTR Advisory Board as founder and consultant for literacy-based activities. By using his position as a young-adult fiction author, Haarsma helps bring attention, support, and funds to the organization.

=== School visits ===
Haarsma takes part in school visits to promote his book and encourage imagination and reading in the school children. His presentation lasts fifty minutes, and discussions center around space travel, exploration, The Rings of Orbis universe, and other interactive topics, thus allowing for questions from the students at the conclusion. To help illustrate the scientific topics, NASA supplied Haarsma with space related information to present. "PJ Haarsma was inspirational. He visited my school and made my imagination soar. I've already filled up a couple notebooks of stories thanks to him!" Says one child whose school Haarsma visited.

During his presentation, Haarsma involves the children in various interactive activities. These include a Hollywood-style acting audition, an alien ghost story, and a demonstration of the vast distances in space. The activities are designed to engage the children's imaginations and to make them feel a part of the presentation.

The responses to his visits from both students and teachers are positive. The majority of the feedback involves praise and thanks. Haarsma has received many stories of previously reluctant readers being observed reading The Softwire books during school recess.

== Awards ==
- The Softwire series: ABC (Association of Booksellers for Children) New Voices in Children's Literature Award 2008
- Virus on Orbis 1: 2006 Cybil Award nominee, Flamingnet Top Choice Award, SCASL Junior Book Award nominee, ALA (American Library Association) Quick Picks for Reluctant Young Adult Readers Nomination 2008, Great Stone Face Children's Book Award Nomination (Children's Librarians of New Hampshire) 2008-2009, Hal Clement Award for Young Adult Finalist 2007
- Betrayal on Orbis 2: 2008 Cybil Award nominee, ALA (American Library Association) Quick Picks for Reluctant Young Adult Readers Nomination 2009
- "Journey" commercial for UCI Health: Commercial – Single Spot winner at the 2021 Regional Emmy Awards from the Pacific Southwest Chapter of the National Television Academy, as Redbear Films and shared with Andre Marcel and Drew Lewis

== Works ==
Books in The Softwire series scheduled for publication by Candlewick Press (Each book corresponds to one year on each ring that the children must endure as slaves).

The Softwire Series

- Virus on Orbis 1, Candlewick Press, 2006 hardcover ISBN 978-0-7636-2709-6 paperback ISBN 978-0-7636-3638-8
- Betrayal on Orbis 2, Candlewick Press, 2008 hardcover ISBN 978-0-7636-2710-2
- Wormhole Pirates on Orbis 3, Candlewick Press, 2009 hardcover ISBN 978-0-7636-2711-9
- Awakening on Orbis 4, Candlewick Press, March 2010 hardcover ISBN 978-0-7636-2712-6
