= The Softwire =

Book series

- Book 1 in the series
- The Softwire: Virus on Orbis 1 The Softwire: Betrayal on Orbis 2 The Softwire: Wormhole Pirates on Orbis 3 The Softwire: Awakening on Orbis 4
- Author: PJ Haarsma
- Language: English
- Genre: Young adult, Science fiction
- Publisher: Candlewick Press
- Published: 22 August 2006 – 2 April 2010
- Media type: Print (hardback & paperback)

Book 2

Book 3

The Softwire is a series of four young adult science fiction novels by PJ Haarsma. It is set in space, in an original fictional universe of Haarsma's creation. A group of around two hundred children are orphaned in outer space on their journey to the Rings of Orbis: giant, planet-like rings which surround a wormhole. The children's parents are killed during an incident in the "seed-ship" in which they are traveling and the computer controlling the ship has raised the children—the eldest of whom are thirteen-years-old as the ship reaches Orbis.

By Orbisian law, the children are required to enter into four years (or "rotations", as the aliens called it) of indentured servitude to pay for their trip. Each novel takes place during one year of indentured servitude. One of the children, thirteen-year-old Johnny Turnbull (JT), becomes the first ever human softwire—someone who can "speak to" and "enter into" computers with his mind. The Softwire focuses on JT, his sister Ketheria, and their friends, Max and Theodore.

The books are accompanied by a free online role-playing game called Rings of Orbis which requires players to answer questions about the novels in order to solve puzzles and advance within the game.

The first three chapters of "The Softwire: Virus on Orbis 1", read by Haarsma's close friend Nathan Fillion, are freely available on the web as a taster.

== Background ==
The Softwire details the fictional account of human orphans condemned to slavery in an alien world. Although completely comprehensible as a functioning civilization, this alien world has no similarity to anything on Earth.

The Softwire exists on two planes: simple, adventurous tales of a young boy discovering his purpose in life; and complex, compelling renditions of corruption and oppression, and their effect upon the human spirit. The overriding premise behind the series is the maturation of Johnny T as he struggles to overcome an abusive domination which pushes him to fulfill his destiny as a leader, and as a guardian. Positive themes which are explored include: compassion, perseverance, fear, family, kindness, cruelty, self-reliance and the power of positivism. A constant question posed is whether a person can retain his sense of ethics when consistently exposed to situations of desperate adversity.

Each book takes place on one of four, alien-constructed rings, which surround the XYZ wormhole. Each ring has a specific purpose toward the maintenance of Orbisian society: Orbis 1 is the seat of government; Orbis 2 is the industrial center which houses crystal refineries; Orbis 3 is the center of commerce for Citizens who control the rings; and Orbis 4 is the location of the service industries for the system. The XYZ wormhole is used by various creatures for commercial purposes: the selling of precious crystals mined from two nearby moons to civilizations throughout the galaxy.

The Citizens are individuals from varied alien races; they maintain control of Orbisian wealth through the Trading Council. Most are lazy and most have lost all compassion for lower classes on a societal scale. Newcomers flock to Orbis in search of a better life, agreeing to become indentured servants for the privilege. These newcomers are called Knudniks, and are treated as nothing more than property. Knudniks agree to serve four rotations of strictly enforced labor on each ring (roughly the equivalent of one Earth year), naively believing that they will automatically escape their inferior status and thus become wealthy and powerful in an Orbisian, "enlightened" world. However, they soon discover that greed and corruption govern their society.

Orbis is governed by highly respected Keepers, i.e. two-headed aliens of great wisdom and power. They are considerably kinder than the Citizens and do not abuse their power. The Keepers affirm the agreements formed after the War of Ten Thousand Rotations, and they patiently await a return of the Ancients. The Keepers revere the Ancients, and hope for their reappearance to restore the Rings to a former state of enlightenment, despite a fact that the Ancients have not been seen for sixty thousand rotations. Also highly respected are Nagools, i.e. bizarre, spiritual beings who protect the teachings of the Ancients.

Banished from Orbis are the Space Jumpers, the protectors of the Keepers and the Rings. These mysterious beings have been absent from Orbis for so long that they are almost legendary among the Orbisians. Space Jumpers are greatly feared by Citizens, for Space Jumpers have an ability to "jump" through Space and Time. It is this combination of mystique and close affiliation with the Keepers that has brought about their exile.

It is also into this alien world of tenuous governmental rule, upper class greed, lower class oppression, and hope for the return of enlightenment that an unassuming, thirteen-year-old, human boy suddenly enters and sets into motion a change. Johnny T is the fulcrum for the future of an entire civilization.

=== Synopsis ===
==== Virus on Orbis 1 ====
Virus on Orbis 1 introduces Johnny Turnbull, his sister Ketheria, and a group of orphaned children who are forced into slavery on the rings of Orbis. It opens on board Renaissance, a human seed ship where JT lives with 200 other children, orphaned in space. After their parents have died in sleepers, apparently due to a malfunction, the children are raised by a ship's computer known as Mother. JT's biggest problem is in dealing with Switzer, the ship's bully; otherwise, he lives a quiet and unassuming life watching over his mute sister, Ketheria...except, JT has one oddity: he communicates telepathically with Mother and claims to receive answers in return. JT always wonders what kind of fantastic world his parents once desired for a new home. Now, as Renaissance arrives at Orbis 1, he is going to find out.

Orbis 1 seems wondrous. Yet the children are immediately shocked to learn that they will be expected to fulfill their parents' contract for their passage. Their freedom which they once enjoyed on the Renaissance is quickly reduced to slavery. Now their new "Guarantor", Boohral is a heartless Citizen. Intrigue builds. JT and the Orbisians soon learn that JT can enter computers with his mind, then later with his essence—that is, JT is a "softwire" (the very first human softwire) and it is this use (or abuse) of telepathic computer-interaction which propels The Softwire series forward. Since the Orbisian Universe is run by an enormous, self-correcting, central computer, JT's gift is great cause for concern. Many Citizens aspire to possess him so that he can be used for their own gain. JT just wishes to be normal.

Unfortunately, the central computer begins to malfunction. Suspicion is immediately cast upon the young human softwire. JT is imprisoned. He remains there for scientific study until a breakout (aided by Space Jumpers) sets him on a journey inside the central computer. Meanwhile, the Keepers and the members of the Trading Council suspect one another of creating an Orbisian civil war. No one believes JT's claim that a being, living inside the computer – a virus – is responsible. As the situation spirals uncontrollably, the Keepers give JT a choice: life permanently inside the computer to avert the war, or death. Neither is acceptable.

JT gets his chance to seek his own solution when he is kidnapped by Madame Lee, the despicable head of the Trading Council. She needs JT in order to gain control of the central computer, to destroy the Keepers security on Orbis 1. Then she will march on Magna, the city of the Keepers, with her army of fishy Neewalkers. Meanwhile, she holds JT's sister prisoner, and threatens to kill Ketheria if JT does not do as Madame Lee commands.

Madame Lee spins an astonishing tale asserting that JT's father was a Space Jumper. She claims he tired of living in exile and despised the discord on the Rings of Orbis. She says he left for Earth to complete a final mission for the Trust – one that Madame Lee did not want fulfilled. She claims responsibility for the deaths of all the adults aboard the Renaissance.

JT refuses to accept that his father was anything other than human, and is filled with vengeance for his father's death. He formulates a plan to communicate with the virus to get her to help him warn the Keepers of Madame Lee's plans. But his plan is fraught with danger: if he is separated from his physical body for too long, his body will die and he will be condemned to live inside the computer for all eternity. JT finds the virus as she struggles for survival against the self-correcting central computer, and he works quickly to give her a translation codec, the means to save her from destruction by copying herself into a new destination. JT soon learns that the virus has been fighting Madame Lee's corrupt programming (which was responsible for the many malfunctions) and the virus is a benign consciousness with a name – Vairocina. As soon as JT and Vairocina get through the Keeper's security portals to warn them of Madame Lee's army, JT and Vairocina find that Madame Lee is waiting with more vicious programs: one which contains Madame Lee herself and her scheme is to control all of Orbis by controlling the central computer. Suddenly JT must battle monstrous digital soldiers, gaining power by losing connection with his physical form. He rips Madame Lee's essence from her program and she is systematically dismantled and sent to the trash. In the end, JT narrowly escapes death, and gains an important ally in a new friend: Vairocina.

Throughout his ordeal, JT questions the decisions made by his parents whom he never knew. Yet he holds onto a positive spirit as he contemplates the significance of the Rings of Orbis: a strange civilization beyond the security of the seed ship which he left behind.

Although The Softwire is not illustrated, a representation of a honine is depicted here from the game The Rings of Orbis. PJ Haarsma and Redbear Films, Inc.

==== Betrayal on Orbis 2 ====
Betrayal on Orbis 2 is the second novel in The Softwire series. It was released on 25 March 2008.

Betrayal opens with the enslaved children being moved to Orbis 2 for their second rotation of servitude. Their hopes for a better position within the social hierarchy (due to JT's heroic efforts on Orbis 1) are dashed suddenly when their aged and feeble Guarantor tries to sell them into a seedy, underground market. A spectacular disaster quickly saves them from this terrible condition, but their fate is replaced by a work ethic under a horridly gross alien; he lives in a container of smelly glop. He is more sinister than their former Guarantor but JT finds solice in acquiring a new position of responsibility: Because he is a softwire, he will be able to communicate with Toll, one of two, gigantic Samirans, i.e. water creatures whose job it is to cool the crystals mined from the moons, Ki and Ta. Samirans live in an enormous tank on Orbis 2—though lately, Toll, the male Samiran, has become very agitated, and thus has been damaging the tank. This causes a massive flood and massive worry. Samirans are integral to the economy of the Orbisian system but the central computer cannot translate their language and no one is able to communicate with them until JT: it is his job to find out why Toll has grown restless and violent.

JT's first effort to speak with Toll results in near-death. As he lies semi-conscious, he overhears talk of a mysterious "Trust" and the "Scion". His subsequent visits with the huge, aquatic creature result in a bond of friendship. However, Toll hints at a subterfuge afoot, and explains that he and Smool, a female Samiran, have served for nearly two thousand rotations. Toll angrily demands their release, much to the upset of all the self-centered Trading Council members. Making matters worse, Ketheria, JT's telepathic sister, reveals that Smool is pregnant. Ketheria now has wisdom far beyond her years and is fascinated with the OIO Philosophy of the Nagools. Now, she is no longer mute, but rather quiet and clear, a voice of sadness and pain.

Although the plot revolves around JT discovering and stopping a betrayal of terrible consequences, there are smaller instances of loyalties betrayed among the children, even by JT himself. The consequences of these smaller betrayals are profound, especially for JT, as he is put in a leadership position, and then forced to administer punishment against the other children. The action-filled plot comes to a head as the various betrayals deepen and as JT works to uncover an unbelievable web of greed.

Toll takes JT to Toll Town, located deep within the depths of the Samiran tank. Toll Town is a secret hub from which operations are run to free knudniks from their Guarantors and get them passage off of Orbis. He trusts JT to keep Toll Town a secret. Like Madame Lee on Orbis 1, Toll tells JT that JT's father was a Space Jumper, with whom Toll was acquainted one thousand rotations ago. Toll shares an important detail regarding Father's mission for the Trust: bring back a special human child to Orbis.

Meanwhile, JT's nemesis, the bully Switzer, receives a comeuppance when the children set out on an adventurous escapade through ancient tunnels; they soon discover an old Space Jumper's belt. Switzer is so desperate to escape Orbis that he foolishly attempts to use the belt, not thinking twice about turning his back on his one and only friend, Dalton. In turn, Switzer's actions cause JT—in a frantic attempt to prevent Switzer from using the belt—to betray Toll's trust and to reveal the secret of Toll Town. Switzer eventually "dies" because of that incident.

The results of these betrayals and an attempted space jump are both spectacular...and catastrophic.

The children are granted a rare moment of fun at the magnificent Festival of the Harvest. But their merriment is suddenly halted when it becomes clear how horrifically low greed will drive Obisian actions. JT discovers although the agreement to release Toll and Smool will be kept, the intention of the Trading Council is to enslave the Samirans' soon-to-be-born child as a replacement. Now it is up to JT to release Toll and Smool into the Orbisian ocean before Toll realizes the sinister plot and causes a massive flood; it will drown everyone in Core City, including the human children. JT works with his computer-dwelling ally, Vairocina. They manipulate the various control gates and safety mechanisms between the Samiran tank and the open ocean. Simultaneously they rescue the refugees of Toll Town, fighting mechanized Sea Dragons and witnessing the birth of the Samiran baby. Once Toll and his family are set free, JT has an opportunity to choose freedom for both himself and his sister at the expense of leaving his friends behind—though they are, in essence, his family. It is not a betrayal JT is willing to consider.

As in the first novel, the questions about why JT's parents wanted to travel to Orbis persist. But this time more clues are shared to heighten the mystery. JT's maturation is evident as he learns to accept the responsibilities of his extraordinary gift.

The Softwire Series carefully chronicles the downward spiral of the children as their hopelessness deepens under the cruel treatment of the Orbisians; their sadness and loss of their innocence is seen through JT's eyes. Yet the reader directly witnesses JT's struggle to hold onto his compassion, his hope and his moral standards. JT is flawed and fails at times, but his introspective intelligence pulls him through.

== Rings of Orbis ==
=== Races ===
- Honines
- Humans
- Keepers
- Neewalkers
- Belarans
- Choi
- Solinns
- Trefaldoors
- Samirans
- Ancients

=== Characters ===
- Johnny "JT" Turnbull—the very first human softwire
- Ketheria Turnbull—his mute sister, wiser than her years and acts old for her age, is discovered to be a telepath, one that can read minds.
- Theylor—one of the Keepers of Orbis, discovers JT's extraordinary gift.
- Madame Lee—marches her army of Neewalkers against Magna, the city of the Keepers, her "essence" was ripped into the computer by JT, and is assumed to be dead.
- Randall Switzer—attempts a space jump and disappears soon after on Orbis 2, reappears on Orbis 3 as the wormhole pirate Ceesar, whose original name Switzer was mispronounced by the alien who saves his life
- Vairocina—The gentle virus who is also the friend of Johnny "JT" Turnbull, "lives" inside the Central Computer
- Toll—threatens to flood Core City with the oceans of Orbis
- Charlie Norton—One human adult from Orbis 1 that helps JT and is a friend of JT, dies on Orbis 3 as JT's "guarantor".
- Maxine "Max" Bennett—One of JT's closest friends, found out on Orbis 3 to be JT's girlfriend.
- Theodore Malone—Another one of JT's friends, who finds joy in counting things and shows OCD (Obsessive Compulsive Disorder) characteristics.
- Dalton—The best friend/dimmer clone (stated in The Softwire Virus on Orbis 1) of Switzer, and was with him when he died
- Nugget—Weegin's son, who seems to like Ketheria

=== Rings of Orbis game ===
Author PJ Haarsma has created an online role playing game, Rings of Orbis, which is set in the same universe as The Softwire books. Players are encouraged to read the books to facilitate solving puzzles within the game. PJ Haarsma and The Rings of Orbis were featured in a front-page article in The New York Times about encouraging reluctant readers with video games.

== Reception ==
=== Awards and nominations ===
The Softwire series has been nominated for two Cybils (The Children's and Young Adult Blogger's Literary Awards): one in 2006 for Virus and another in 2008 for Betrayal.

Virus on Orbis 1 was selected for the New York Public Library's "Books for the Teen Age 2007" list. The first book was also given a "Top Choice Award" by Flamingnet Young Adult Book Reviews. The South Carolina Associate of School Librarians (SCASL) nominated Virus on Orbis 1 for their Junior Book Award.
