= OSW Review =

Professional wrestling and film podcast

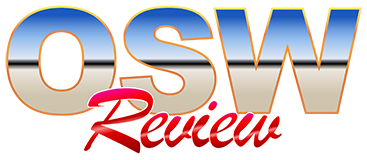
- Genre: Comedy
- Format: Video and audio

Cast and voices
- Hosted by: Jay Hunter

Publication
- No. of episodes: 136 (excluding bonus episodes)
- Original release: 2008

OSW Review (full name Old School Wrestling Review) is an Irish video podcast which reviews professional wrestling events and movies. Founded by Jay Hunter, the podcast is independent but syndicated to professional wrestling critic video series Botchamania. The podcast was founded in 2008 with a panel of three hosts, Hunter, Steve "V1" Roe and "Mr. OOC" (abbreviation of "Out Of Character," a term from online fantasy pro-wrestling promotions & forums, real first name Steve, surname unknown). A fourth host, "Neo"/Niall was also featured in early episodes, but has not been featured since. Botchamania creator Maffew Gregg has served as a guest host on some occasions. The show drew inspiration from the professional wrestling Review-a-Wai and video gaming Epic Battle Axe podcasts.

Hunter also promoted a weekly radio show for Radio Dublin named Super OSW 64.
