= Skyler Day =

American actress and singer-songwriter (born 1991)

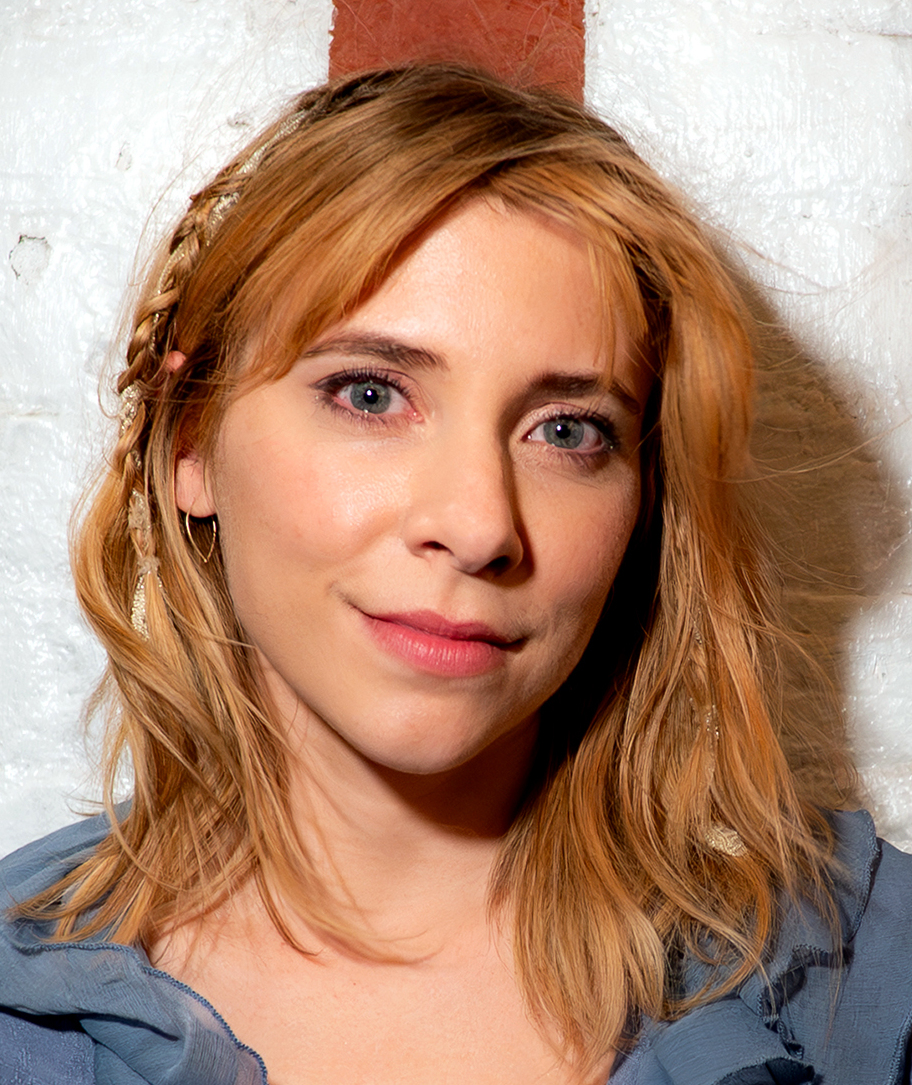
- Day at the Hotel Café in 2026
- Born: Skyler Elizabeth Day; August 2, 1991 (age 35); Cumming, Georgia, U.S.
- Occupations: Actress; singer-songwriter
- Years active: 2003–present
- Spouse: Ian Nelson (m. 2017)
- Children: 1
- Relatives: Dalton Day (brother)
- Website: www.skylerday.com

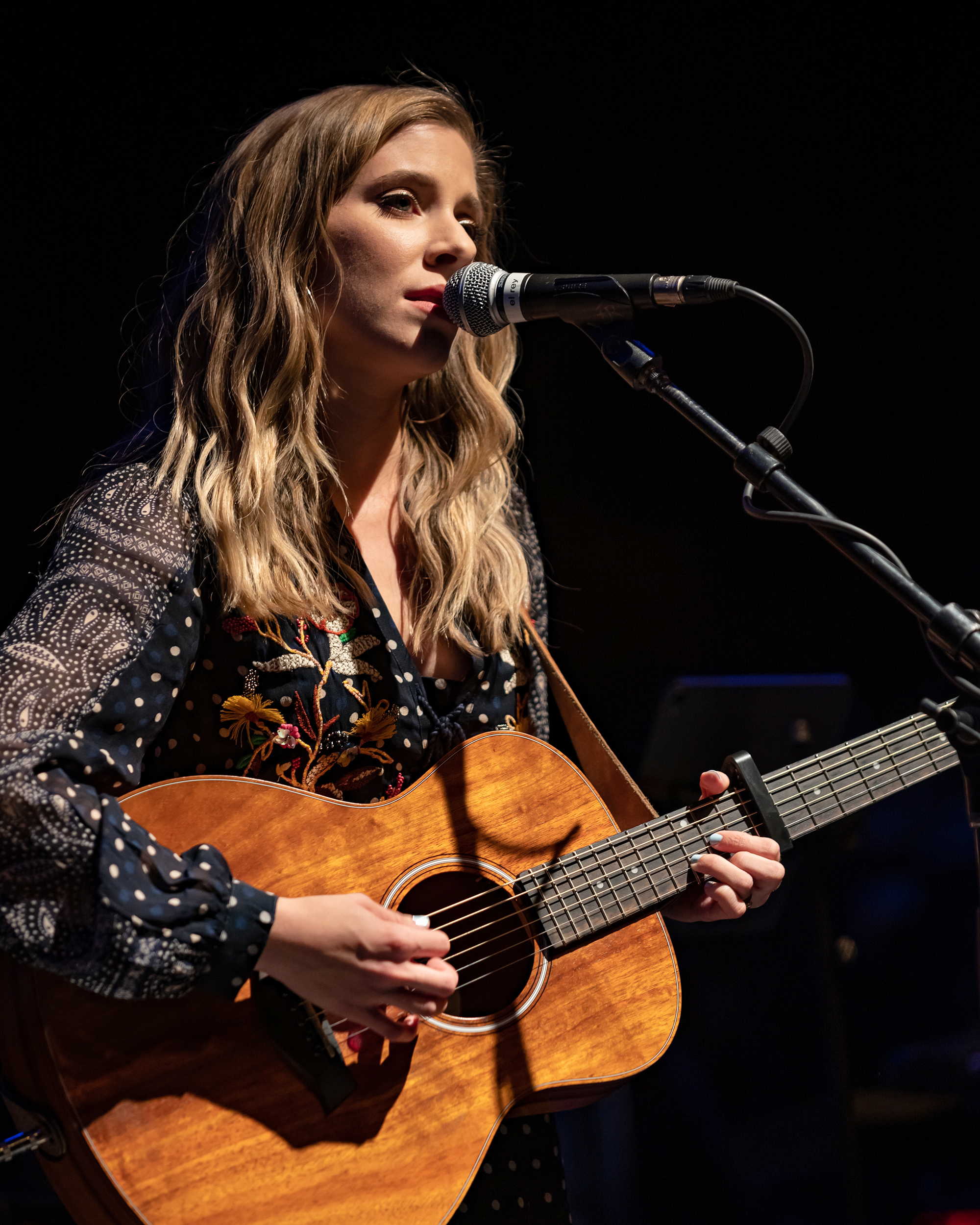
Day performing at El Rey Theatre in 2020

Skyler Elizabeth Day (born August 2, 1991) is an American actress and singer-songwriter. She is best known for her recurring roles as Maggie Ritter on the TeenNick series Gigantic and as Amy Ellis on the NBC series Parenthood.

== Life and career ==
Day was born in Cumming, Georgia. She started participating in gymnastics and modeling at an early age. She was then discovered by a talent agent as a result of a chance encounter at the DMV. In 2003, she co-starred in the Atlanta-based short film A Perilous Dance: The Damon DeRivers Story. In 2004, she and her family moved to French Valley, California, to pursue a career in the entertainment industry.

For many months, she auditioned for television pilots and took jobs doing radio voice-overs and television commercials. In 2003, she was cast in the titular role in the independent film The Adventures of Ociee Nash opposite Keith Carradine and Mare Winningham. From 2004 to 2008, she co-starred in numerous television films and short independent films before guest starring in a 2009 episode of iCarly. Her other television credits include Southland, Drop Dead Diva, The Whole Truth, Days of Our Lives, Law & Order: LA, Sonny with a Chance, CSI: Miami and Good Luck Charlie. In 2010, she had a recurring role in the TeenNick series Gigantic, the series ended the following year after one season. In 2011, she landed the role of Amy Ellis on the NBC series Parenthood.

Besides acting, Day is also a singer-songwriter. Growing up she took classes in musical theater, acting and songwriting. Much of her music can be found on her official YouTube account.

On October 26, 2014, Day released her debut EP Between the I and the You. The EP contained five songs. On August 1, 2017, Skyler released her second EP Los Angeles, which consists of six songs.

== Personal life ==
Day was homeschooled after second grade. She has an older sister, Savannah, and a twin brother who is also an actor and singer, Dalton Day. All three have competed in gymnastics and cheerleading. Her parents, David and Kelly, were also gymnasts and owned a gym in Norcross, Georgia. Her father now works as a recruiter in the construction field. She and her family are committed Christians.

Day started dating actor Ian Nelson in January 2013. She wrote a song called "Ian's Song" for Nelson which is included on her Between the I and the You EP (2014). On November 26, 2015, during their trip to Italy, Nelson proposed to Day in Cortona. In a live stream on YouTube celebrating her music video release for "Ian's Song" on September 10, 2016, Day said that after the proposal, she wrote another song about Nelson called "Mine Sweet Mine", which she performed during the live show. Day and Nelson married in Camarillo, California on September 30, 2017. In July 2024, Day announced she was pregnant with her first child, she gave birth to a boy the following December.

== Filmography ==
Film
Year	Title	Role	Notes
2003	A Perilous Dance: The Damon DeRivers Story	Mary Katherine Grainger	Short film
2003	The Adventures of Ociee Nash	Ociee Nash	
2004	Moved	Mary	Short film
2006	Rite of Passage	Renee	Short film
2007	Redemption Maddie	Classmate Girl #2	Short film
2008	Little Wonders	Lucy Sturges	Short film
2008	First Period	Libby	Short film
2010	Backlight	Lucy	Also stunt performer
2013	Channeling	Ashleigh Maddox	
2015	Strays	Zoe	Short film
2016	Storytelling	Mary Roberts	Short film
2016	For You	Jess	Short film
2021	Florence & Normandie	Frances	Short film
2022	Shaky Shivers	Karen Too	

Television
Year	Title	Role	Notes
2005	Untitled David Diamond/David Weissman Project	Liza	Unsold TV pilot
2006	Hollis & Rae	Stephanie	Television film
2009	iCarly	Magic Malika	Episode: "iSpeed Date"
2010	Southland	Lauren Ryerson	Episode: "Butch & Sundance"
2010	Drop Dead Diva	Lana Dooley	Episode: "The Long Road to Napa"
2010	The Whole Truth	Brianna Sellards	Pilot episode
2010	Days of Our Lives	Teenage Sydney	Episode #1.11459
2010–11	Gigantic	Maggie Ritter	Recurring role, 15 episodes
2011	Sonny with a Chance	Mel Winters	Episode: "New Girl"
2011	CSI: Miami	Ashley Chandler	Episode: "F-T-F"
2011	Good Luck Charlie	Kayla	Episode: "Something's Fishy"
2011	Law & Order: LA	Mila Ackroyd	Episode: "Plummer Park"
2011	Who Is Simon Miller?	Sarah Miller	Television film
2011	The Closer	Missy Michaels	Episode: "Star Turn"
2011	CSI: Crime Scene Investigation	Sylvia Grier	Episode: "Freaks & Geeks"
2011–14	Parenthood	Amy Ellis	Recurring role, 17 episodes
2012	Army Wives	Sophie Clarke	3 episodes
2012	Grey's Anatomy	Emery James	Episode: "Love the One You're With"
2013	Wedding Band	Catherine	Episode: "Personal Universe"
2013	The Client List	Honey	Episode: "Unanswered Prayers"
2013	Ironside	Nicole Holt	Episode: "Sleeping Dogs"
2013–14	Law & Order: Special Victims Unit	Renee Clark	Episodes: "Girl Dishonored" & "Comic Perversion"
2014	Workaholics	Brooke	Episode: "Beer Heist"
2014–15	Pretty Little Liars	Claire	Episodes: "Who's in the Box?" & "Oh Brother, Where Art Thou"
2015	Constantine	Miranda	Episode: "A Whole World Out There"
2015	Code Black	Veronica Franco	Episode: "Buen Arbol"
2015–16	Con Man	Tiffany Gizela	4 episodes
2016	iZombie	Starlee Decker	Episode: "Method Head"
2016	Hawaii Five-0	Nikki Pressman/Julie Hillman	Episode: "Ka hale ho'okauweli"
2016–17	Sweet/Vicious	Mackenzie	9 episodes
2017	Raven's Home	Paisley	3 episodes
2019–22	The Resident	Nurse Clara Rasmussen	7 episodes
2021	Dave	Sadie	Episode: "Somebody Date Me"
2023	iCarly	Magic Malika	Episode: "iReunited and It Felt Okay"

== Discography ==
EPs

- Between the I and the You (2014)
- Los Angeles (2017)
- Songs from the Greenhouse (2021)

Singles

- "Honest" (2019)
- "Sleepwalking" (2019)
- "6 Feet Apart" (2020)
- "If Not" (2021)
- "The Best Worst Thing" (2023)
- "Monsters" (2023)
- "Heartcrusher" (2024)
- "Those Three Things" (2024)
- "The Chase" (2024)
- "No Catch" (2024)
- "Voicemails" (2025)
