= Dan Duran (broadcaster) =

Canadian actor and broadcaster

Dan Duran is a Canadian actor and broadcaster, best known as a former co-anchor with Carla Collins of the Canadian entertainment news series ENow. He was more recently seen in the recurring role of the ill-fated "Man from Protected" in the well-received Canadian television series Cra$h & Burn.

In May 2011, he was announced as the morning show host on CJWV-FM, a new radio station in Peterborough, Ontario. His cohost is actor Linda Kash.

== Filmography ==
=== Film ===
Year	Title	Role	Notes
1996	Maximum Risk	Reporter	
1997	Murder at 1600	CNN Reporter #1	
2000	X-Men	Newscaster #3	
2000	Bless the Child	Reporter	
2000	Deeply	Radio voice	
2001	Down to Earth	Reporter	
2001	Driven	Commentator #1	
2002	Death to Smoochy	Hunter	
2002	Duct Tape Forever	Announcer	
2002	Cypher	Buffalo Speaker #1	
2003	Fast Food High	Host	
2004	Welcome to Mooseport	Local News Anchor Daryl	
2004	Dawn of the Dead	Confused Reporter	
2005	Get Rich or Die Tryin'	Journalist	
2007	Firehouse Dog	Dapper Host	
2009	The Time Traveler's Wife	Lottery Announcer	
2009	Saw VI	Newscaster	
2010	Kick-Ass	Reporter	
2013	White House Down	Reporter	
2016	Special Correspondents	Regis Roach	
2016	Arrival	TV Anchor	
2017	Molly's Game	Commentator #2	
2019	The Silence	News Anchor	
2019	American Woman	Newscaster 2	
2019	Dark Phoenix	News Anchor	
2019	Disappearance at Clifton Hill	Field Reporter	
2023	Paw Patrol: The Mighty Movie	Radio announcer	

=== Television ===
Year	Title	Role	Notes
1992–1993	Street Legal	Brad Gerber	5 episodes
1993	Gross Misconduct: The Life of Brian Spencer	Anchorperson	Television film
1993	Ghost Mom	Bob	Television film
1994	RoboCop	Bo Harlan	23 episodes
1995	The Red Green Show	Network TV Harold	Episode: "The Network Deal"
1996	Double Jeopardy	Field Reporter	Television film
1996	Gotti	T.V. Announcer	Television film
1996	Mistrial	CNN Reporter	Television film
1996, 1997	F/X: The Series	Newscaster	2 episodes
1997	Time to Say Goodbye?	News Anchorman	Television film
1997	Johnny 2.0	Newscaster	Television film
1998	When Husbands Cheat	Kenny	Television film
1998	A Father for Brittany	Field Reporter	Television film
1998	Universal Soldier III: Unfinished Business	Freddie Smith	Television film
1999	Mind Prey	FBI Technician	Television film
1999	Happy Face Murders	TV Host	Television film
1999	Forget Me Never	Newscaster	Television film
2000	I Was a Sixth Grade Alien!	TV Announcer	Episode: "Attack of the 1000 Foot Veeblax!"
2000	The Wonderful World of Disney	Rex Lombard	Episode: "Angels in the Infield"
2000	Cheaters	Correspondent	Television film
2000	The Deadly Look of Love	Beauty Pageant Host	Television film
2000	Quints	Reporter	Television film
2000, 2001	Twice in a Lifetime	Various roles	2 episodes
2001	Kiss My Act	Storm Hale	Television film
2001	Soul Food	TV News Anchor	Episode: "Running as Fast as I Can"
2001	The Day Reagan Was Shot	Network Anchor	Television film
2001	RoboCop: Prime Directives	Bo Harlan	4 episodes
2002	Crossing the Line	Broadcaster #2	Television film
2002	The Brady Bunch in the White House	Morton	Television film
2002	The Eleventh Hour	Simon Rhodes	Episode: "A Low Dishonest Decade"
2003	Queer as Folk	Host	Episode: "Brat-Sitting"
2004	Redemption: The Stan Tookie Williams Story	Campus Reporter	Television film
2004	ReGenesis	Stan	Episode: "Spare Parts"
2005	Naturally, Sadie	Reporter	2 episodes
2007	Air Crash Investigation	Gregory Karam	Episode: "Fire Flight"
2008	Victor	Sports Announcer #1	Television film
2008	The Border	Frank Metcalf	Episode: "Enemy Contact"
2008	True Confessions of a Hollywood Starlet	Dave	Television film
2008	XIII: The Conspiracy	Warren Glass	2 episodes
2009	The Jon Dore Television Show	Chet Goodman	Episode: "Jon Needs Quick Cash"
2009–2010	Cra$h & Burn	Man From Protected	12 episodes
2010	The Latest Buzz	Narrator	Episode: "The Back to School Issue"
2015	Heroes Reborn: Dark Matters	Channel 6 Newscaster	2 episodes
2015–2017	Man Seeking Woman	Various roles	4 episodes
2016	Sensitive Skin	Radio Jazz Host	Episode #2.5
2016	Dark Matter	News Anchor	2 episodes
2016	American Gothic	News Anchor	Episode: "The Oxbow"
2016	Channel Zero	Interviewer	Episode: "You Have to Go Inside"
2016–2019	Designated Survivor	Various roles	6 episodes
2017	Cradle to Grave	Adam (50-70)	Television film
2017	Deadly Dance Mum	Dance-Off Host	Television film
2018	In Contempt	Anchor	Episode: "Burned Out"
2018	Condor	News Anchor	3 episodes
2019	V Wars	News Anchor	2 episodes
2020–2022	The Boys	VNN News Anchor	4 episodes
2022	Revenge of the Black Best Friend	Voice	2 episodes
