= Ian Nelson (footballer) =

Scottish footballer

Personal information
- Full name: Ian Nelson
- Place of birth: Scotland
- Position: Outside right

Senior career*
Years	Team	Apps	(Gls)
- Arbroath Victoria
1954–1955	Queen's Park	0	(0)

International career
1956	Scotland Amateurs	1	(0)
- * Club domestic league appearances and goals

Ian Nelson was a Scottish amateur football outside right who made one Scottish League Cup appearance for Queen's Park. He was capped by Scotland at amateur level.
