= Botchamania =

British web series

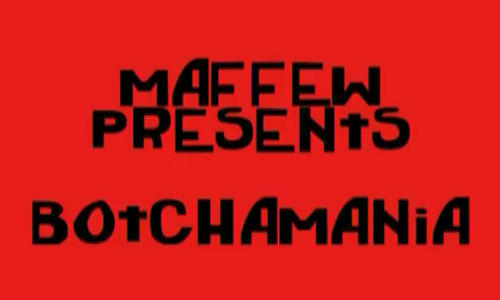
- The original Botchamania logo/wordmark/title card, as used in the early 2010s
- Genre: Professional wrestling; Critique; Parody
- Created by: TheOriginalMikey
- Country of origin: United Kingdom
- No. of episodes: 537

Production
- Editor: Matthew "Maffew" Gregg
- Running time: Typically 20 minutes

Original release
- Network: YouTube; Dailymotion; Vimeo (until 2010); BitChute
- Release: 2006 (KiKrusher99 edit); 2007 (Maffew edit)

Botchamania is a web series, primarily hosted on YouTube, that focuses on compiling and showcasing mistakes, blunders, and embarrassing moments from the world of professional wrestling, known as "botches". The term "botch" in wrestling jargon refers to any unintentional or poorly executed manoeuvre or action during a match. These can include missed moves, awkward falls, audible communications, and other instances where the scripted nature of wrestling is momentarily broken, revealing the staged nature of the performance.

Although he did not create the series, it is most commonly associated with British video editor Matthew "Maffew" Gregg, who took control in 2007 and has continued it into the present day, despite several lengthy disputes with many wrestling promotions over copyright and fair use. The show typically features montages of various wrestling botches, set to a soundtrack of video game music and filled with humorous captions and commentary. While the primary focus is on showcasing these mistakes, Botchamania often incorporates other humorous content from behind-the-scenes of professional wrestling as well as offering its own commentary on various incidents within wrestling.

== Background ==
In the mid-2000s, a user named "TheOriginalMikey" uploaded a wrestling bloopers video (set to the album version of Black Eyed Peas' "Let's Get It Started") to a number of web forums. With the formation of YouTube in 2005, a user named "KiKrusher99" uploaded a re-edited version of the video, and renamed it, giving it its iconic name, Botchamania. Maffew has described this video as "more of a Botchamania Redux". A third video in the series was uploaded by a user named "JoeyNightHeat" in 2007. After watching the video, Maffew felt that he could do a better job, and uploaded his own, becoming the fourth in the series. When he realised he had some leftover clips, he uploaded another video and ended up continuing the series. Eventually, Maffew would remake the first three videos in his own distinct style.

== Content ==
Botchamania focuses mainly on showcasing obvious mistakes and mishaps which take place during the course of professional wrestling shows, however, other forms of content on the show include matching "shoot" (out-of-character) commentary from professional wrestlers themselves and overlaying the audio over the incident they are discussing. Content on Botchamania encompasses the entire industry, ranging from experienced veteran professional wrestlers performing for major international promotions such as WWE, AEW, NJPW and CMLL to rookie wrestlers performing for local independent circuit shows.

Some recurring segments in Botchamania are named after songs or song lyrics, for example, "You talk too much", which covers incidents of wrestlers audibly communicating instructions to one another ("calling spots") during the match. Another segment is named "I am the table", which centres on instances of wrestlers failing to break through tables. One segment that isn't named after a song or lyrics is called "Insipid Taz commentary", focusing on the often unintentional comedic moments created by commentator Taz.

== Reception within the pro wrestling industry ==
Initial reactions to Botchamania by professional wrestling performers were generally negative, as many performers who were unfamiliar with the content of the show mistakenly assumed that it celebrated clips of the wrestlers being injured. However, as awareness of Botchamania and its light-hearted tone developed, many wrestlers have either publicly played along with jokes from the show or directly praised it. As relations between Botchamania and professional wrestlers thawed, the show began to feature personalised introductions to the show by various wrestlers themselves, while Maffew would occasionally share a stage with wrestling performers at fan conventions such as Starrcast.

By 2015, Botchamania had developed a more positive image within wrestling, with stars such as Stone Cold Steve Austin and Dolph Ziggler making public reference to it. In 2022, Shotzi Blackheart commented that after being involved in a botch at WWE's Money in the Bank event in 2022, she couldn't "wait to see that spot on Botchamania" and laugh at it, while Mace has favourably recalled a poorly reviewed match from Hell in a Cell "going viral" because of Botchamania. During AEW's All In pay-per-view event in 2023, lead announcer Excalibur referenced a long-running joke from Botchamania during a botch in the Sting/Allin vs. Strickland/Cage match.

Fans of Botchamania regularly bring signs to professional wrestling shows that reference back to the web show, while a particularly egregious botch occurring on a show can prompt the fans in attendance to chant "Botch-a-mania!".

In December 2018, WWE created their own in-house version of Botchamania for their WWE Network, entitled The Botch Club, hosted by Karl Anderson and Luke Gallows. However, the show was cancelled after just a handful of episodes had aired.

== Copyright issues ==
Since its creation, Botchamania has faced issues with copyright infringement and content takedowns. By 2015, Botchamania had experienced at least nine YouTube accounts made for the show being banned by the platform, primarily due to content strikes generated by WWE material.

In March 2021, All Elite Wrestling issued a number of copyright strikes against Botchamania after it featured content from Blood & Guts, in which cameras filming Chris Jericho performing a stunt in which he fell from the top of a cage showed him landing safely onto crash pads. Because there were multiple strikes, this automatically caused YouTube's system to suspend the Botchamania YouTube channel. As part of AEW's claim to YouTube, their legal team attempted to argue that AEW footage was not eligible for fair use as they had exclusive legal rights to AEW footage. However, following a backlash on social media, AEW withdrew the copyright strikes and the Botchamania channel was restored.
