= Dalton Day =

American actor and singer (born 1991)

- Born: August 2, 1991 (age 35); Cumming, Georgia, U.S.
- Occupations: Actor, singer
- Years active: 2003–present

Dalton Day (born August 2, 1991) is an American actor and singer.

== Life and career ==
Day was born in Cumming, Georgia. Day had the opportunity to be on a film set in Atlanta Georgia with his twin sister in her first film The Adventures of Ociee Nash. Day was home schooled after second grade until high school, when he attended Chaparral High School in Temecula, California. He was a competitive gymnast until a serious skate boarding accident when he was 14 years old. During his recovery time, his parents bought him a guitar. Now, he is a self taught musician/songwriter. Day began acting professionally in 2011. His first acting job was Criminal Minds in 2011. Because of his gymnastics background, stunts come very easily and he enjoys doing his own stunts on set whenever he is allowed.

== Personal life ==
Day has a twin sister, actress/singer Skyler Day, who is two minutes older than him, and an older sister named Savannah. He started participating in gymnastics at an early age. His parents, David Day and Kelly Karem, were both gymnasts and owned a gym in Norcross, Georgia. His father now works as a recruiter in the construction field. In 2004, he and his family moved to French Valley, California, to allow Skyler to pursue a career in the entertainment industry. He and his family are committed Christians.

== Filmography ==
Film
Year	Title	Role	Notes
2003	The Adventures of Ociee Nash	Boy at Creek	Direct-to-video film

Television
Year	Title	Role	Notes
2011	Criminal Minds	Shaun Rutledge	Episode: "There's No Place Like Home"
2013	CSI: Crime Scene Investigation	Carl Abrams	Episode: "Sheltered"
2013	Reading Writing & Romance	Hunter	TV movie
2014	ROYALS	Ben	TV movie

== Discography ==
=== Singles ===
Year	Song	Featuring	Writers	Notes	Album	Origin
2009	Hello	Skyler Day		Original		Myspace
2011	Melt Away			Original		YouTube
2011	I Will Follow You into the Dark		Death Cab for Cutie	Cover		YouTube
2011	Cliche	Skyler Day		Original		YouTube
2011	This Roof			Original		YouTube
2011	Where Were You			Original		YouTube
2012	How Do I Know	Skyler Day		Original		YouTube
2012	Come Down To The River	Skyler Day		Original		YouTube
2013	History	Skyler Day		Original		YouTube
2014	Staring at the Sky		Passenger	Cover		YouTube
2014	You and I	Skyler Day	Ingrid Michaelson	Cover		YouTube
2015	Glad You Came			Original		YouTube
2015	Sunday Morning		Maroon 5	Cover		YouTube
2016	Night Train		Amos Lee	Cover		YouTube
