= Nathan Fillion =

Canadian–American actor (born 1971)

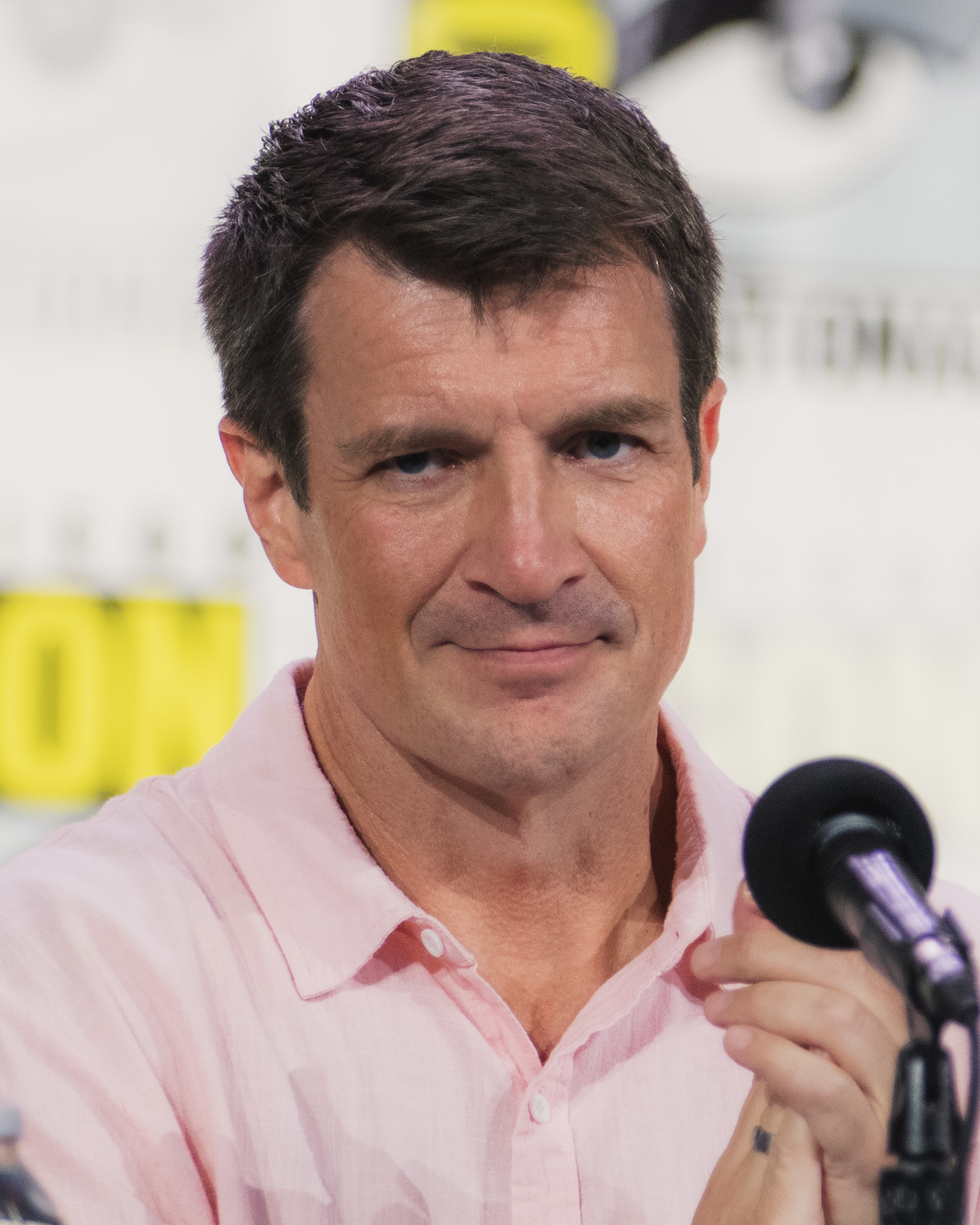
- Fillion at the 2026 San Diego Comic-Con
- Born: March 27, 1971 (age 55); Edmonton, Alberta, Canada
- Citizenship: Canada; United States
- Occupation: Actor
- Years active: 1993–present
- Notable work: One Life to Live; Firefly; Castle; The Rookie

Nathan Fillion (Note: Although the Canadian Encyclopedia lists Fillion's middle name as "Christopher", Fillion states that it is not his middle name and that he wants to keep his middle name unknown to the public.) (born March 27, 1971) is a Canadian-American actor. He played the leading roles, Captain Malcolm "Mal" Reynolds on Firefly (2002) and its film continuation Serenity (2005), and Richard Castle on Castle (2009–2016). Beginning in 2018, he has starred as Officer John Nolan on The Rookie. He is also an executive producer on the show, as well as its spin-off series, The Rookie: Feds (2022–2023). He is set to produce an upcoming spin-off, The Rookie: North.

Fillion has acted in traditionally distributed films such as Slither (2006) and Trucker (2008), Internet-distributed films including Dr. Horrible's Sing-Along Blog and James Gunn's PG Porn (both 2008), television soap operas, sitcoms, and theatre. His voice is featured in animation and video games, such as the Halo series games Halo 3 (2007), Halo 3: ODST (2009), Halo: Reach (2010), and Halo 5: Guardians (2015), the Destiny series games Destiny (2014), and Destiny 2 (2017), the television series M.O.D.O.K. (2021), and in the DC Universe Animated Original Movies (2011–2019) as Hal Jordan / Green Lantern. He continued to portray Green Lantern in the DC Universe (DCU), this time as the incarnation of Guy Gardner, starring in the DCU film Superman (2025), and appearing in series Peacemaker (2025) and Lanterns (2026).

Fillion first gained recognition for his work on One Life to Live (1994–1997; 2007) in the contract role of Joey Buchanan, for which he was nominated for the Daytime Emmy Award for Outstanding Younger Actor in a Drama Series, as well as for his supporting role as Johnny Donnelly in the sitcom Two Guys and a Girl (1998–2001).

Fillion received an honorary doctor of laws degree on May 30, 2025, from Concordia University of Edmonton.

== Early life ==
Fillion was born on March 27, 1971, in Edmonton, the younger of two sons of Robert "Bob" Fillion and June "Cookie" Early, both retired English teachers. Both sides of his father's family were part of the Quebec diaspora in Fall River, Massachusetts, and his mother had a Norwegian maternal grandfather and a Finnish maternal grandmother.

Fillion was raised in Edmonton's Mill Woods neighborhood and completed his secondary education in Edmonton, attending Holy Trinity Catholic High School. He attended Concordia University College of Alberta, then transferred to the University of Alberta (where he was a member of the Kappa Alpha Society), but did not graduate. He has been a U.S. citizen since 1997. Fillion has stated that, though many sources have said that he has been engaged, he has not been.

== Career ==
=== 1994–2008: Early career and breakthrough ===
After working in several theatre, television, and film productions, including Theatresports with Rapid Fire Theatre and the improvised soap opera Die-Nasty, Fillion moved to New York City in 1994, where he acted in the soap opera One Life to Live as Joey Buchanan, for which he was nominated in 1996 for a Daytime Emmy Award for Outstanding Younger Actor in a Drama Series. In 1997, he left the series to pursue other projects (returning for a brief guest appearance in 2007).

After moving to Los Angeles, he played a supporting role in the sitcom Two Guys, a Girl, and a Pizza Place, and was cast as James Frederick "the Minnesota" Ryan in Steven Spielberg's Saving Private Ryan.

In 2002, Fillion starred as Captain Malcolm Reynolds in the Joss Whedon science-fiction television series Firefly, for which he won the Cinescape Genre Face of the Future – Male award by the Academy of Science Fiction, Fantasy & Horror Films, USA. Fillion also won the Syfy Genre Awards in 2006 for Best Actor/Television and was runner-up for Best Actor/Movie. Fillion called his time on Firefly the best acting job he ever had, and compares every job he has had to it. After Firefly's cancellation, Fillion reprised his role as Mal in Whedon's film Serenity (2005).

In 2003, Fillion had a recurring role as Caleb in the final five episodes of Joss Whedon's series Buffy the Vampire Slayer.

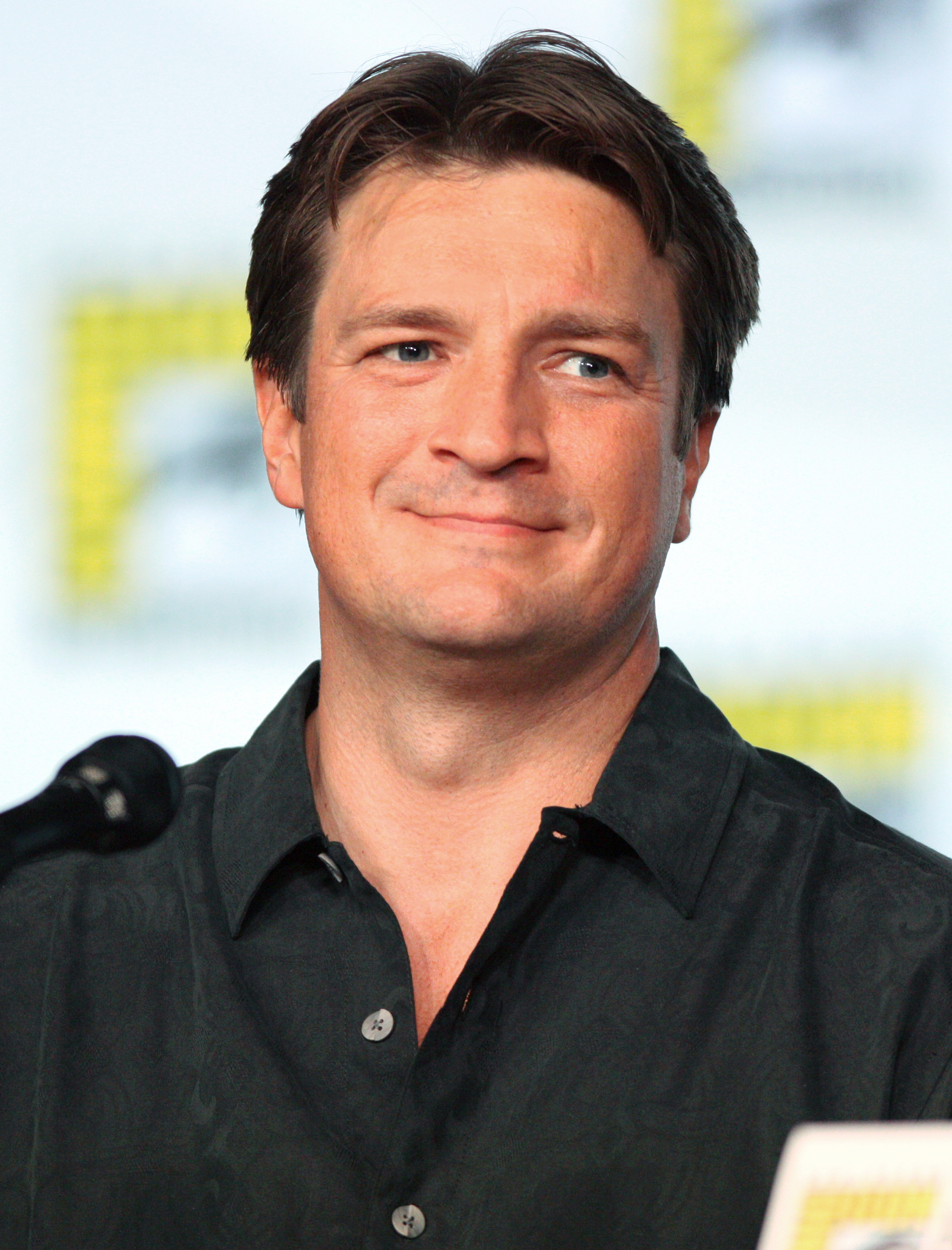
Fillion at the 2012 San Diego Comic-Con

Fillion lent his voice to the animated series King of the Hill in 2001, the video game Jade Empire (as the voice of Gao the Lesser), and the animated series Justice League Unlimited (as Vigilante in the episodes "Hunter's Moon" and "Patriot Act") in 2005–06. He portrayed Green Lantern/Hal Jordan in Green Lantern: Emerald Knights, Justice League: Doom, Justice League: The Flashpoint Paradox, Justice League: Throne of Atlantis, and The Death of Superman. Fillion starred in James Gunn's 2006 horror film Slither. For his starring role as Bill Pardy, he garnered a 2006 Fangoria Chainsaw Awards nomination in the category of Dude You Don't Wanna Mess With.

Fillion starred in the romantic comedy film Waitress, written and directed by Adrienne Shelly, which premiered at the Sundance Film Festival on January 21, 2007, and opened in theatres on May 2, 2007. Fillion starred in White Noise 2: The Light. He made one appearance in the 2006–2007 season of the television show Lost, as Kevin, Kate's ex-husband.

In October 2006, Fillion signed a talent-holding contract with the Fox Broadcasting Company, and in December 2006, The Hollywood Reporter confirmed that Fillion was cast as Alex Tully in the series Drive, which debuted on Fox in the spring of 2007. Drive was created by Tim Minear. Ivan Sergei played Alex Tully in the original pilot episode of Drive. The first two Drive episodes premiered on April 13, 2007, in Canada (April 15, 2007, in the United States). The show did not deliver the ratings Fox desired, though, so on April 25, 2007, the network announced that the series was cancelled. The final two produced episodes were supposed to air back-to-back on Fox in July 2007, but did not actually become available until July 15, when they were posted on the Drive MySpace page.

Fillion reprised his 1990s role as One Life to Live's Joey for the series' 9,999th and 10,000th episodes, aired August 16 and 17, 2007.

Fillion joined the cast of ABC's Desperate Housewives at the beginning of the fall 2007 season (season four), portraying Dr. Adam Mayfair. His first appearance was in the episode "Now You Know", which aired on September 30, 2007. His final appearance was the final episode of that season in 2008.

Fillion voiced the role of an ODST gunnery sergeant in the Xbox 360 game Halo 3, alongside fellow Firefly stars Alan Tudyk and Adam Baldwin. At one point early in the first mission, he identifies himself as "[Sergeant] Reynolds" over the radio, referring to his character's name from the TV series Firefly. All three actors are given personalities in the game that match those of their characters from Firefly. He provides the voice, portrayed likeness, and motion-capture performance for Gunnery Sergeant Edward Buck in Halo 3: ODST, Halo 5: Guardians, and a brief appearance in Halo: Reach.

=== 2009–2018: Television and films ===
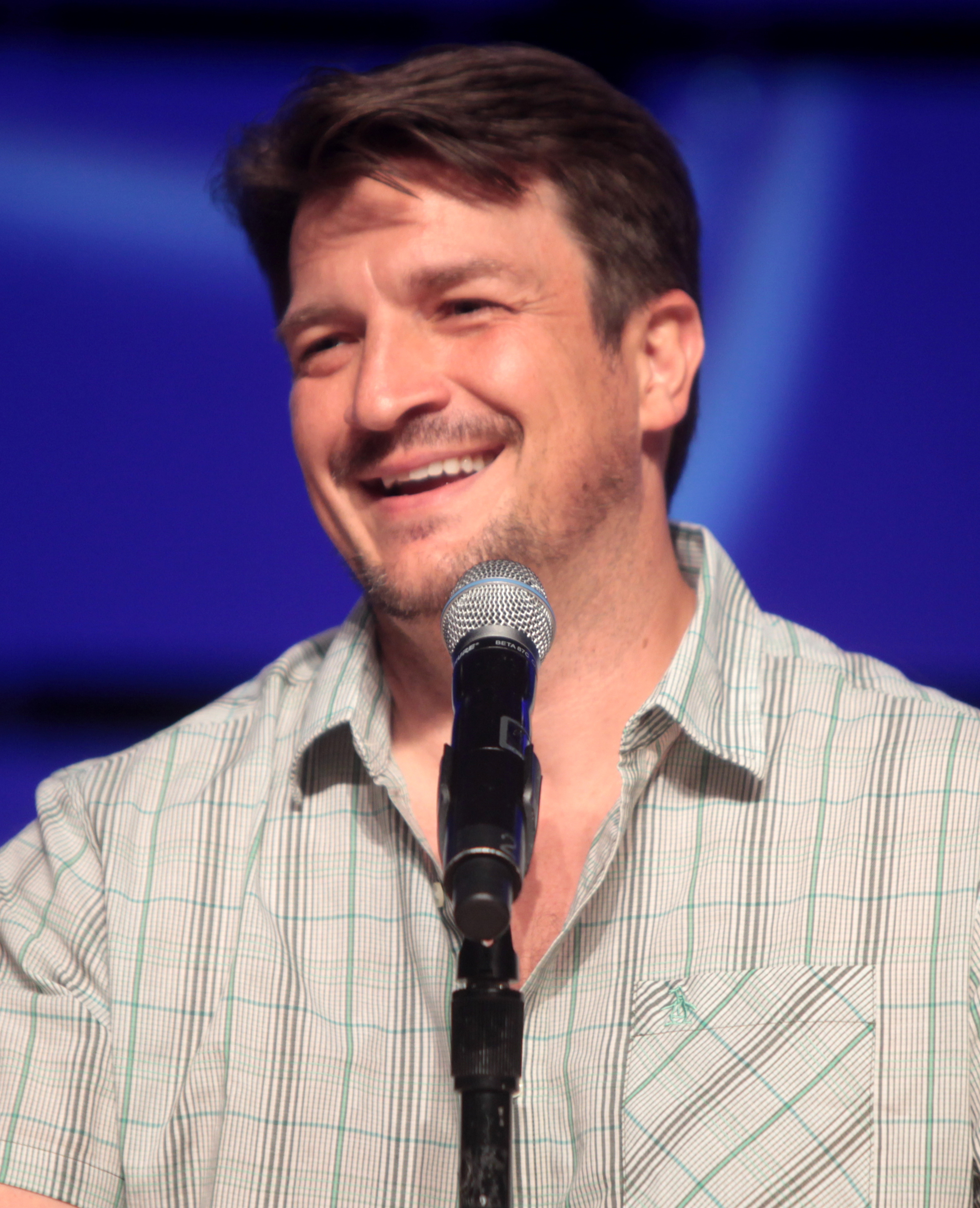
Fillion at the 2014 Phoenix Comicon

In March 2009, the first episode of the ABC television series Castle aired, in which Fillion starred as the titular character Richard Castle, a mystery novelist who helps the NYPD solve (frequently bizarre) murders. In 2009, Fillion was nominated for Satellite Award for Best Actor – Television Series Drama for his performance in Castle. The show was cancelled by ABC in 2016, with the final episode airing on May 16 of that year.

BuddyTV ranked him number10 on its list of "TV's 100 Sexiest Men of 2009", No. 19 in 2010, No. 20 in 2011 and No. 39 in 2012; No. 7 on its list of "The 15 Best Drama Lead Actors of the 2011–2012 TV Season"; named his character's relationship with the other main character as No. 18 (and the Best Flirting Relationship) on its list "Love Is All Around: Best TV Relationships of 2010", No. 13 (and the Best Delayed Relationship) on its list of "The Best Relationships of 2011", No. 15 on its list of "The Special Relationships: TV's Top 50 Love Stories of the Past Decade", No. 1 on its list "Love... Or Not: The Top 12 Will-They-or-Won't-They Couples of 2012" and No. 2 on its list "Lip Smacking Good: The Best Kisses of 2012"; named Castle as number six on its list of "The 11 Best Returning TV Shows of 2011", number 11 on "The 15 Best Dramas of the 2011–2012 TV Season" and number 12 on "The 12 Best Dramas of 2012".

Fillion was featured in a spoof-porn web video on Spike called "Nailing Your Wife", part of James Gunn's PG Porn series. Fillion made a brief cameo appearance in the season 5 episode "Revolving Doors" of the web series The Guild. In late September 2011, Fillion guest starred as the Action Sports 1 anchor in the web series Husbands. He played Dogberry in the independent film Much Ado About Nothing (2012), based on the Shakespeare play of the same name, written, directed and produced by Joss Whedon.

Since 2011, Fillion has appeared as the recurring Space Western character Cactoid Jim in performances of the podcast live show The Thrilling Adventure Hour, a stage show premised on the idea that actors are performing as characters in a radio show. The character of Cactoid Jim first appeared as part of the recurring segment "Sparks Nevada, Marshal on Mars", but was soon given his own segment, called "Cactoid Jim: King of the Martian Frontier". Fillion has advertised his participation as a guest star on The Thrilling Adventure Hour by means of including filmed elements of the live show on the DVD set for season four of Castle.

In 2012, he appeared in the episode "The Daly Superheroes" of the web series The Daly Show. On February 17, 2013, Fillion hosted the 2013 WGA West Coast Awards.

In 2014, he appeared in the video game Destiny as the character Cayde-6. Over the next few years, his role became larger with expansions to the game. Fillion returned to the role in the 2017 sequel Destiny 2 and featured prominently in the game until the release of Forsaken, where the character was instead voiced by Nolan North until the character's death. On May 24, 2023, he was announced to be returning to voice Cayde-6 for The Final Shape.

In 2015 and 2016, Fillion worked with Alan Tudyk on a web series called Con Man, loosely based on their experiences on the convention circuit after Firefly.

In 2017, Fillion was cast in the recurring role of Gary West on the Netflix horror-comedy series Santa Clarita Diet. In the same year, Fillion was cast in the recurring role of Jacques Snicket on the second season of the Netflix comedy drama series A Series of Unfortunate Events.

In February 2018, Fillion was cast to star as John Nolan in the new ABC TV series The Rookie, which was created by former Castle executive producer Alexi Hawley.

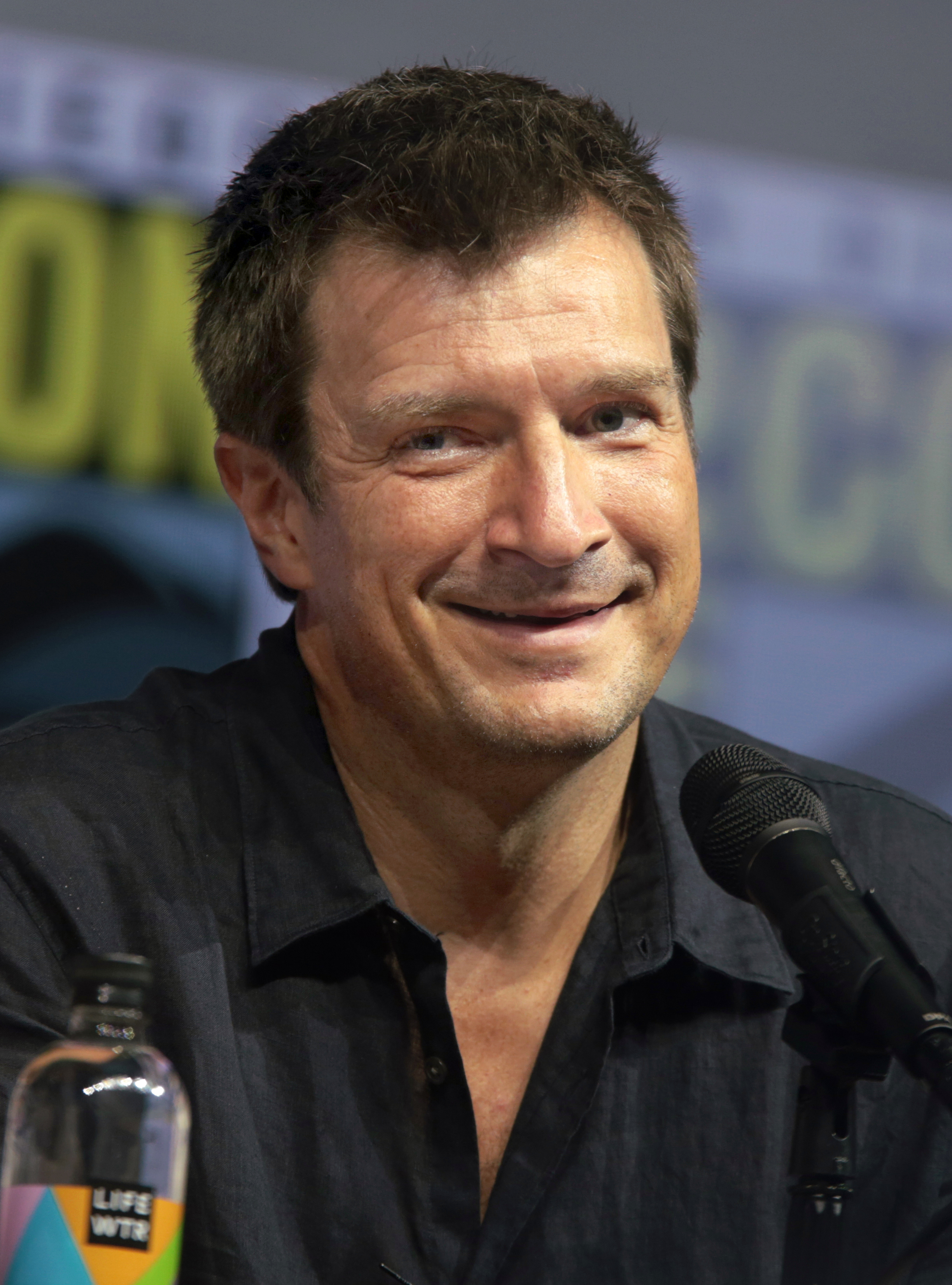
Fillion at the 2018 San Diego Comic-Con

On July 16, 2018, Fillion and director Allan Ungar released a live-action short film based on the Naughty Dog franchise Uncharted. The short immediately went viral and was praised for its witty humor, action, and ability to stay true to the source material. Fans and critics took to social media and began campaigning for Netflix to turn it into a series while referring to it as one of the best adaptations of a video game.

=== 2018–present: The Rookie, Marvel and DC roles ===
Fillion in 2025

In the late 2010s and early 2020s, Fillion acted in multiple films by his long-time friend and collaborator director James Gunn's films for Marvel Comics and DC Comics and played supporting roles such as T.D.K. in the DCEU film The Suicide Squad and Master Karja in the MCU film Guardians of the Galaxy Vol. 3 in 2023.

After Gunn was hired as the co-head of DC Studios alongside producer Peter Safran in 2022 and launched a new interconnected universe based on the world of DC Comics called the DCU, Fillion was cast in the role of DC Comics superhero and one of the multiple human Green Lanterns Guy Gardner/Green Lantern, for Gunn's 2025 film Superman. While this was his first time portraying the character of Guy Gardner, Fillion had prior experience with the Green Lantern characters and area of the DC Universe as he had previously voiced another human member of the Green Lantern Corps, Hal Jordan, in multiple animated projects since 2011. Shortly after Fillion's casting was announced, Gunn later mentioned that Fillion would reprise his role as Gardner beyond Superman in the larger DCU. In 2024, Variety reported that Fillion is expected to reprise his role as Gardner in a supporting role in the upcoming DCU series Lanterns, a series that will feature other human Green Lanterns Hal Jordan and John Stewart as the main characters. Fillion also appeared as Gardner in the second season of Peacemaker. In 2025, Fillion started a podcast called Once We Were Spacemen with Alan Tudyk.

== In popular culture ==
The Nathan Fillion Civilian Pavilion in Old Strathcona, named in 2024 after the actor

Fillion has been associated with public artist Martin Firrell since 2009. He is the subject of two works of contemporary public art by Firrell: Complete Hero (digital projections of text and video portraiture to the West and North elevations of the Guards Chapel, Wellington Barracks, London, 2009) and Metascifi (a digital app investigating American television science fiction series for ideas and strategies for living well).

Fillion was the "face" of Complete Hero. The artist explained the choice of Fillion as: "I wanted to make a piece of work that looked at all kinds of heroism, not just the usual derring-do of white, square-jawed men. But I thought it would be interesting to start with a white, square-jawed man and Nathan Fillion agreed to take part."

In Metascifi, Fillion discusses the deeper significance of his Firefly character Captain Mal Reynolds, reflecting on some of the universal preoccupations of any human life: death, love, evil, intimacy, power, vulnerability, violence, and freedom.

In August 2021, Edmonton City Hall was renamed the "Nathan Fillion Civilian Pavilion" for 24 hours, after a petition from fans with over 27,000 signatures and support from Fillion's costars in The Suicide Squad. Following the success of the City Hall renaming, in 2024 the Old Strathcona Business Association installed a parklet on Whyte Avenue permanently bearing the Civilian Pavilion name.

== Philanthropy ==
In 2007, Fillion and author PJ Haarsma co-founded the nonprofit organisation Kids Need to Read, to help inspire children's imaginations by getting more books into underfunded libraries.

Fillion's association with Charity: Water garnered over $60,000 worth of donations in 2019.

== Filmography ==
Key
†	Denotes films that have not yet been released

=== Film ===
Year	Title	Role	Notes	Ref.
1994	Strange and Rich	Walter Hoade		
1998	Saving Private Ryan	Pvt. James Frederick "Minnesota" Ryan		
1999	Blast from the Past	Cliff		
2000	Dracula 2000	Father David		
2003	Water's Edge	Robert Graves		
2004	Outing Riley	Luke Riley		
2005	Serenity	Malcolm "Mal" Reynolds	Resolution to the TV series	
2006	Slither	Bill Pardy		
2007	White Noise 2: The Light	Abe Dale		
2007	Waitress	Dr. Jim Pomatter		
2008	Trucker	Runner		
2009	Wonder Woman	Steve Trevor	Voice, direct-to-video	
2010	Super	The Holy Avenger		
2011	Green Lantern: Emerald Knights	Hal Jordan / Green Lantern	Voice, direct-to-video	
2012	Justice League: Doom	Hal Jordan / Green Lantern	Voice, direct-to-video	
2012	Much Ado About Nothing	Dogberry		
2013	Monsters University	Johnny Worthington III	Voice	
2013	Justice League: The Flashpoint Paradox	Hal Jordan / Green Lantern	Voice, direct-to-video	
2013	Percy Jackson: Sea of Monsters	Hermes		
2014	Party Central	Johnny Worthington III	Voice, short film	
2014	Guardians of the Galaxy	Blue Alien Prisoner	Voice, cameo	
2015	Justice League: Throne of Atlantis	Hal Jordan / Green Lantern	Voice, direct-to-video	
2015	Highway of Tears	Narrator	Voice, documentary	
2015	Being Canadian	Himself	Documentary	
2016	Deadpool	Towel Guy	Deleted scene	
2017	Yamasong: March of the Hollows	Shojun		
2017	Cars 3	Sterling	Voice	
2017	Guardians of the Galaxy Vol. 2	Simon Williams	Scene deleted	
2018	The Death of Superman	Hal Jordan / Green Lantern	Voice, direct-to-video	
2018	Henchmen	Captain Superior	Voice	
2018	Night Hunter	Matthew Quinn		
2019	Reign of the Supermen	Hal Jordan / Green Lantern	Voice, direct-to-video	
2021	The Suicide Squad	Cory Pitzner / T.D.K. (The Detachable Kid)		
2023	Guardians of the Galaxy Vol. 3	Master Karja		
2024	Deadpool & Wolverine	Wade Wilson / Headpool	Voice	
2024	Skincare	Brett		
2025	Superman	Guy Gardner / Green Lantern		
2027	Man of Tomorrow †	Guy Gardner / Green Lantern	Post-production	

=== Television ===
Year	Title	Role	Notes
1993	Ordeal in the Arctic	Master Warrant Officer Tom Jardine	Television film
1994–1997; 2007	One Life to Live	Joey Buchanan	7 episodes
1996	Spin City	Guy	Uncredited; Episode: "A Star Is Born"
1997	Total Security	Troy Larson	Episode: "Das Bootie"
1998	Maggie Winters	Ronald	Episode: "Mama's Got a Brand New Bag"
1998–2001	Two Guys and a Girl	Johnny Donnelly	60 episodes
1999	The Outer Limits	Michael Ryan	Episode: "Star Crossed"
2001	King of the Hill	Frisbee Guy	Voice; Episode: "Luanne Virgin 2.0"
2002	Pasadena	Rev. Glenn Collins	3 episodes
2002	Firefly	Malcolm "Mal" Reynolds	14 episodes
2003	Alligator Point	Bill	Episode: "Pilot"
2003	Buffy the Vampire Slayer	Caleb	5 episodes
2003	Miss Match	Adam Logan	6 episodes
2004	Hollywood Division	Det. Tommy Garrett	Pilot
2005–2006	Justice League Unlimited	Vigilante	Voice; 3 episodes
2006	Lost	Kevin Callis	Episode: "I Do"
2007	Drive	Alex Tully	6 episodes
2007–2014	Robot Chicken	Multiple roles including: Flash and Green Lantern	6 episodes
2007–2008	Desperate Housewives	Dr. Adam Mayfair	11 episodes
2009–2016	Castle	Richard Castle	173 episodes
2010–2018	The Venture Bros.	Brown Widow	Voice; 4 episodes
2012	American Dad!	Joel Larson, Liver	Voices; Episode: "The Kidney Stays in the Picture"
2012	American Dad	American Businessman Klaus	Voice; Episode: "Love, AD Style"
2013	Writers Guild of America Awards 2012	Himself (host)	Television special
2014–2015	Community	Bob Waite	2 episodes
2014–2016	Gravity Falls	Preston Northwest	Voice; 5 episodes
2015	The Big Bang Theory	Himself	Episode: "The Comic Book Store Regeneration"
2015	Kroll Show	Mountie McMinniman	Episode: "Twins"
2015	Drunk History	Wernher von Braun	Episode: "Space"
2016	HarmonQuest	Tetter Spice	Episode: "Earthscar Village"
2016–2018	Modern Family	Rainer Shine	7 episodes
2017–2018	Santa Clarita Diet	Gary West	6 episodes
2017	Rick and Morty	Cornvelious Daniel	Voice, Episode: "The Rickshank Rickdemption"
2017	Brooklyn Nine-Nine	Mark Deveraux	Episode: "Serve & Protect"
2017–2025	Big Mouth	Himself, Nate	Voices; 10 episodes
2018	A Series of Unfortunate Events	Jacques Snicket	10 episodes
2018	The Magic School Bus Rides Again	Axle ValveStuck	Voice; Episode: "Waste Not, Want Not"
2018	American Housewife	Himself	2 episodes
2018–present	The Rookie	Officer John Nolan	Main role; also executive producer 144+ episodes
2021–2022	Resident Alien	Number 42 – Octopus in tank	Voice, 7 episodes
2021	M.O.D.O.K.	Simon Williams / Wonder Man	Voice; Episode: "This Man... This Makeover!"
2022–2025	The Recruit	CIA Director Alton West	5 episodes
2022–2023	The Rookie: Feds	Officer John Nolan	3 episodes; also executive producer
2024	Monsters at Work	Johnny Worthington III	Voice; 8 episodes
2025	Krapopolis	Zan	Voice; 2 episodes
2025	The Mighty Nein	The Gentleman	Voice; 3 episodes
2025	Peacemaker	Guy Gardner / Green Lantern	Episode: "The Ties That Grind"
2026	Family Law	Bud Nielsen	Episode: "Second Chances"
2026	Lanterns	Guy Gardner / Green Lantern	2 episodes
TBA	Firefly: The Animated Series †	Malcolm "Mal" Reynolds	

=== Web ===
Year	Title	Role	Notes
2008	Dr. Horrible's Sing-Along Blog	Captain Hammer	Internet miniseries
2008	James Gunn's PG Porn	Chris	Episode: "Nailing Your Wife"
2011	The Morning After	Himself	Episode: "1.173"
2011	The Guild	Himself	Episode: "Revolving Doors"
2011	Kevin Pollak's Chat Show	Himself	Episode: "100"
2011	Husbands	Anchor	Episode: "Being Britney!"
2012	Neil's Puppet Dreams	Dr. Mayfair	Episode: "Doctor's Office"
2013	BriTANicK	Himself/'Two Ugly Guys and a Dog'	Episode: "Sexy Pool Party"
2015–2017	Con Man	Jack Moore	17 episodes; also executive producer
2018	Uncharted Live Action Fan Film	Nathan Drake	Also producer

=== Video games ===
Year	Title	Role	Notes
2005	Jade Empire	Gao the Lesser	
2007	Halo 3	Sergeant Reynolds	
2009	Halo 3: ODST	Gunnery Sergeant Edward Buck	Voice and likeness
2010	Halo: Reach	Gunnery Sergeant Edward Buck	Voice and likeness
2014	Family Guy: The Quest for Stuff	Himself	
2014	Destiny	Cayde-6	
2015	Saints Row: Gat out of Hell	God	
2015	Destiny: The Taken King	Cayde-6	
2015	Halo 5: Guardians	Spartan Edward Buck	Also likeness and motion capture
2017	Destiny 2	Cayde-6	
2023	Marvel's Spider-Man 2	Bodega Cat Mascot	
2024	Destiny 2: The Final Shape	Cayde-6	

=== Audio books ===
Year	Title	Role
2013	World War Z	Stanley McDonald
2020	The Salvage Crew	Narrator

=== Podcast ===
Year	Title	Role	Notes
2021	Bridgewater	Thomas Bradshaw	7 episodes
2025–present	Once We Were Spacemen	Host	With Alan Tudyk

== Accolades ==
Year	Association	Category	Nominated work	Result	Ref.
1996	Daytime Emmy Award	Outstanding Younger Actor in a Drama Series	One Life to Live	Nominated	
1996	Soap Opera Digest Award	Outstanding Younger Leading Actor	One Life to Live	Nominated	
2003	Saturn Award	Cinescape Genre Face of the Future – Male	Firefly	Won	
2005	SFX Award	Best Actor	Serenity	Won	
2005	Empire Awards	Best Newcomer	Serenity	Nominated	
2005	Online Film Critics Society Awards	Best Breakthrough Performance	Serenity	Nominated	
2007	Screen Actors Guild Award	Outstanding Performance by an Ensemble in a Comedy Series	Desperate Housewives	Nominated	
2007	EDA Award	EDA Award for Best Seduction (with Keri Russell)	Waitress	Nominated	
2009	Streamy Awards	Best Male Actor in a Comedy Web Series	Dr. Horrible's Sing-Along Blog	Nominated	
2009	Satellite Awards	Best Actor – Television Series Drama	Castle	Nominated	
2010	Streamy Awards	Best Guest Star in a Web Series	PG Porn	Nominated	
2011	TV Guide Award	Favorite Couple Who Should Get Together (with Stana Katic)	Castle	Won	
2011	Behind the Voice Actors Award	Best Male Vocal Performance in a TV Special/Direct-to-DVD Title of Theatrical Short	Green Lantern: Emerald Knights	Nominated	
2012	TV Guide Award	Favorite TV Couple (with Stana Katic)	Castle	Won	
2012	People's Choice Award	Favorite TV Drama Actor	Castle	Won	
2013	TV Guide Award	Favorite TV Couple (with Stana Katic)	Castle	Won	
2013	People's Choice Award	Favorite Dramatic TV Actor	Castle	Won	
2014	TV Guide Award	Favorite Actor	Castle	Nominated	
2014	People's Choice Award	Favorite On-Screen Chemistry (with Stana Katic)	Castle	Nominated	
2015	People's Choice Award	Favorite Crime Drama TV Actor	Castle	Won	
2015	People's Choice Award	Favorite TV Duo (with Stana Katic)	Castle	Nominated	
2016	People's Choice Award	Favorite Crime Drama TV Actor	Castle	Won	
