= Helena G. Wells =

Fictional character on American television science fiction series Warehouse 13

- Warehouse 13 character
- First appearance: "Time Will Tell"
- Last appearance: "Endless"
- Created by: Jane Espenson
- Portrayed by: Jaime Murray
- Based on: H. G. Wells

In-universe information
- Nickname: H.G.
- Gender: Female
- Occupation: Author; Inventor; Warehouse agent
- Family: Charles Wells (brother)
- Children: Christina Wells (daughter)
- Nationality: English

Agent Helena George "H.G." Wells is a fictional character on the American television series Warehouse 13, played by Jaime Murray. Agent Wells was a recurring guest character of the series, playing the major antagonist of Season 2 and appearing alongside the agents Myka Bering and Pete Lattimer. Wells was portrayed as having a genius-level intellect and a methodical nature besides being an inventor, author, and a former agent of the fictitious Warehouses 12 and 13. Helena Wells is revealed in the show to be the "true" author of the famous H.G. Wells novels who, unable to do so as a woman, used her brother's image and identity to publish the books.

== Character background ==
In the season 3 episode "Stand", it is revealed that Wells joined Warehouse 12 in the year 1889. It is depicted in "Stand" and "Vendetta" that Helena began her work as an agent from that time and continued up until sometime after 1899.

As an Agent of Warehouse 12, it was made clear that she disliked the use of conventional firearms. When she brought the matter to her mentor and boss Chaturanga, he gave her a gun that stuns the victim with electricity. She likely used it as a base model for the Tesla (the primary firearm used by Agents of Warehouse 13) that she portrayed Nikola Tesla in 1893.

After the loss of her daughter Christina, who was killed in a robbery while vacationing with cousins in Paris, Helena became obsessed with finding a way to turn back time and save her. This led to the invention of "H. G. Wells' Time Machine". Helena's time machine in Warehouse 13, unlike the machine described in the novel The Time Machine by H.G. Wells, is not a vehicle. Instead, it transports consciousness to a directed target across time.

After several failed attempts to save her daughter's life, Helena eventually realizes she is unable to change events from the past, and after murdering the men who killed her daughter, she continues to behave recklessly until she eventually inadvertently causes the death of a fellow agent. This event shocks her to the realization that she has become a danger, and she chooses to be bronzed to prevent any further damage. Bronzing is a form of punishment the Warehouse utilizes after conventional imprisonment has failed or is not an option. The subject is cast in bronze in a special machine and thereafter remains conscious, but in a state that resembles cryogenic sleep where the aging process is stopped. She remains bronzed until set free by Leena on the order of James MacPherson in the season finale of season 1.

== Character arc ==
Awakened from bronzing in the Season 1 finale by Leena, Wells is taken away from the Warehouse by MacPherson. She later kills him during the Season 2 premiere episode "Time Will Tell". Throughout Season 2 Helena attempts to be reinstated at the Warehouse as an agent and enlists the aid of Myka Bering as an advocate for her cause. She is eventually reinstated in "Vendetta", but in "Buried" it is clear the ulterior motive for being reinstated is to destroy the world by inducing an extinction event through the use of a stolen artifact. Planning to trigger a massive earthquake with the Minoan Trident in Yellowstone, she later fails to follow through when Myka Bering convinces her to stop by forcing her to shoot Myka if she wishes to carry out her plan. She voluntarily gives herself up for arrest following the confrontation and is taken away.

During her incarceration in Season 3, Helena has no corporeal body and is instead a holographic image. Her consciousness is projected by an artifact allowing her to speak to others while preventing any physical interaction. While in this state she persuades Myka to return to work at the Warehouse in the premiere "The New Guy" and is not seen again until she is brought in for a consultation on a case she had unsuccessfully worked in 1893 as shown in "3...2...1...."

In the finale episodes of Season 3, "Emily Lake" and "Stand", the main antagonist, Walter Sykes, pursues finding Helena's physical form as well as her consciousness in order to reconstitute them. Myka Bering and Pete Lattimer find Helena's physical body in the personage of Ms. Emily Hannah Lake – a high school literature teacher living in Cheyenne, Wyoming. They later discover Helena's consciousness was separated from her physical body by using the Janus Coin artifact. They are unable to save her from being abducted by Marcus Diamond and their under-cover Warehouse agent Steve Jinks who deliver her to Sykes. Sykes reintegrates Helena's body and mind before taking her to China where he forces her to help him open a portal directly into Warehouse 13. She complies only to save Myka Bering's life after an unsuccessful attempt to save Tyler Struhl. Shortly afterward, Helena chooses to sacrifice her life in order to save the lives of her fellow agents from an explosion that obliterates the warehouse.

In the Season 4 premiere, Artie Nielsen uses an artifact to turn back time 24 hours, and successfully finds a way to defuse the bomb that would destroy the Warehouse. Since he is successful in saving the Warehouse, Helena's death, her tragic hero's redemptive act of self-sacrifice, never happened. Artie later successfully advocates on Helena's behalf to keep her from being re-incarcerated. Helena becomes aware of this alternate timeline in "Second Chance", after she deduces, in the previous episode ("Endless Wonder"), that Artie used a time travel artifact to save the Warehouse. Also in this episode, Mrs. Frederic tells her to take the astrolabe and hide it where no one can find it.

In the Season 4 episode, "Instinct", Helena is shown working as a forensic scientist for the Wisconsin police. She is also living, and romantically involved, with a man named Nate. Nate has an eight-year-old daughter named Adelaide, to whom Helena has taught Kenpo as well as deductive reasoning. When Myka confronts Helena and states her belief that Helena is running away from who she is by holding onto the surrogate daughter she has found in Adelaide, Helena becomes incensed and asks her to leave. Later, however, the two women reaffirm their bond and part ways on good terms.

== Skills and abilities ==
Helena's character was created within the series to have a remarkably tuned quality of deductive reasoning, extremely calm focus, and extraordinary attention to detail. Within the Warehouse 13 universe, this allows her character to be portrayed as a science-fiction type of Sherlock Holmes.

Helena is given an expertise in the martial art of Kenpo which she displays in multiple episodes throughout Seasons 2 and 3. She is also shown to be an accomplished author and inventor. Two of her many inventions are the Imperceptor Vest (allows faster-than-humanly-detectable movement) and Cavorite (a fictitious metal with anti-gravity effects, as described in the real H.G. Wells story The First Men in the Moon) – both of which are depicted in "Time Will Tell". Another invention displayed in the show is a grappler gun, shown in episodes "For the Team", "Buried" and "The 40th Floor"; and the time machine as seen in "Where and When", which allows the transference of consciousness to the minds of targeted individuals at a specific date and time. It is implied the character has a fluency in languages as she depicts a fluent grasp of French and a recognition of Demotic Egyptian upon hearing it spoken per "Buried". In the same episode, Wells says she "considers the study of dead languages to be a hobby".

In the episode "Instinct", Helena is shown to be employed as a forensic scientist for a police station in Wisconsin.

== Relationships ==
Helena had three professional relationships from her days at Warehouse 12, with her partner Agent Wolcott, fellow agent McShane, and her teacher Caturanga – as depicted in "3...2...1..." and "Stand". Her professional relationships from her dealings at the current Warehouse are depicted throughout Seasons 2, 3, and 4 and are with Artie Nielsen who serves mostly as her chief detractor until the Season 4 premiere, Claudia Donovan who serves as a mentee, Pete Lattimer a fellow-agent with whom she has some difficulties, and Myka Bering who is her fellow-agent, friend, and a romantic interest of sorts.

== Romantic interests ==
=== Myka Bering ===
While never explicitly shown or stated on the show itself, Joanne Kelly addressed the Warehouse 13 panel discussion's audience at the 2012 San Diego Comic-Con to assert "Myka will always love H.G." and reiterated the romantic attraction between her character and Jaime Murray's in a later interview that same day by saying of the characters "we're in love". In the same interview, she clarifies her statement by making the sexual undertones of their love for each other definitive.

=== Nate ===
In the season 4 episode, "Instinct", Helena is shown to be part of a new family. She lives with a man named Nate and Adelaide, his 8-year-old daughter – to whom Helena has taught the arts of deductive reasoning as well as Kenpo. Helena indicates this new family life is her way of trying to fit into the world again, to find normalcy, away from the Warehouse and the world of the artifacts.

== Helena G. Wells versus the real-life H.G. Wells ==
The Season 2 episode "Time Will Tell" and Season 3 episode "Emily Lake" establish the birth year, birthplace, and later residence of Helena G. Wells to be the same as her real-world counterpart H.G. Wells who was born in 1866 in England.

It is unclear how much of the biographical information available on the historical H.G. Wells would apply to Helena due to her claim that her brother, Charles, is the person history remembers by her name.

== Episode appearances ==
Season 2 (2010)

- "Time Will Tell"
- "For the Team"
- "Vendetta"
- "Where and When"
- "Buried"
- "Reset"

Season 3 (2011)

- "The New Guy"
- "3...2...1..."
- "Emily Lake"
- "Stand"

Season 4 (2012–2013)

- "A New Hope"
- "Endless Wonder"
- "Second Chance"
- "Instinct"
- "Endless"

== Critical reception ==
Jaime Murray's portrayal of Helena G. Wells received critical praise. Her portrayal is described as "saucy", "superb", and as able to "anchor a series". Murray was nominated for a 2012 Portal Award for her portrayal of Helena G. Wells on Warehouse 13.
