= Warehouse 13 season 1 =

Warehouse 13
- Season 1
- DVD cover art
- No. of episodes: 13

Release
- Original network: Syfy
- Original release: July 7 – September 22, 2009

Season chronology
- Next → Season 2

The first season of the American television series Warehouse 13 premiered on July 7, 2009, and concluded on September 22, 2009, on Syfy. The show aired on Tuesdays at 9:00 pm ET. The season consisted of 13 episodes. The show stars Eddie McClintock, Joanne Kelly, Saul Rubinek, Genelle Williams and Simon Reynolds.

== Synopsis ==
At the beginning of season one, Pete and Myka, two secret service agents protecting the president, were transferred against their will to the remote Badlands Wilderness in South Dakota. They were given a job at Warehouse 13 to preserve and retrieve various talisman artifacts worldwide under the supervision of Dr. Artie Nielsen. At first, Pete and Myka were reluctant to be partners, but they grew closer during the season. At the beginning of season one, there was a breach in Warehouse 13's computer system, which turned out to be caused by Claudia Donovan, who wanted Artie to help her bring her brother back from interdimensional limbo where he was trapped. After they saved Joshua, Mrs. Frederic wanted Artie to either hire Claudia or "deal with" her since she knew too much about Warehouse 13. However, Artie was reluctant to hire her until Leena convinced him that it would be better for Claudia to work at the Warehouse.

Throughout season one, Artie's former partner, MacPherson, returned and dug up Artie's past. Myka and Pete learned of Artie's criminal record but changed his name and joined the Warehouse. Later it is revealed that MacPherson has been using Leena to steal items from the Warehouse so he can sell them to buyers around the world until Pete, Myka, and Artie eventually catch him and then take him to the Warehouse to be bronzed. He uses Leena again to reverse his bronzing while using Harriet Tubman's thimble to frame Claudia, and he escapes.

== Cast ==
=== Main ===
- Eddie McClintock as Pete Lattimer
- Joanne Kelly as Myka Bering
- Saul Rubinek as Artie Nielsen
- Genelle Williams as Leena
- Simon Reynolds as Daniel Dickinson

=== Recurring ===
- C. C. H. Pounder as Mrs. Irene Frederic
- Allison Scagliotti as Claudia Donovan
- Roger Rees as James MacPherson

=== Guest ===
- Gabriel Hogan as Sam Martino
- Tricia Helfer as Bonnie Belski
- Joe Flanigan as Jeff Weaver
- Joe Morton as Reverend John Hill
- Mark A. Sheppard as Benedict Valda
- Michael Hogan as Warren Bering
- Susan Hogan as Jeannie Bering

== Episodes ==
No. overall	No. in season	Title	Directed by	Written by	Original release date	US viewers (millions)
1–2	1–2	"Pilot"	Jace Alexander	Story by : Brent Mote & Jane Espenson; Teleplay by : Brent Mote & Jane Espenson & David Simkins	July 7, 2009	3.51
Secret Service agents Peter Lattimer (Eddie McClintock) and Myka Bering (Joanne Kelly) are reassigned by the mysterious Mrs. Frederic (C. C. H. Pounder) to a top-secret facility in South Dakota. Now reluctantly joining the quirky Artie Nielsen (Saul Rubinek) as "gatherers and protectors" of empowered and potentially dangerous objects, Lattimer and Bering investigate a report of domestic abuse in Iowa and discover a small-town lawyer (Sherry Miller) who is channeling Lucrezia Borgia. Artifacts: Aztec Bloodstone, Lucrezia Borgia's Comb, Harry Houdini's Wallet, Pandora's Box.
3	3	"Resonance"	Vincent Misiano	David Simkins	July 14, 2009	3.47
A string of bank robberies in Chicago puts Pete and Myka on the search for a very soothing song, while Artie probes a security breach in Warehouse 13. Artifact: Eric Marsden's Unreleased 45 R.P.M. Record, Steampunk Password Cracker, Still Camera, Lewis Carroll's Mirror
4	4	"Magnetism"	Jace Alexander	Jack Kenny	July 21, 2009	2.87
After recovering a guillotine in Paris, Pete and Myka seek an inhibition-releasing artifact in the fictional town of Unionville, Colorado. The village used for filming was the actual village of Unionville, Ontario, Canada. Meanwhile, Artie, refusing Leena's (Genelle Williams) help, probes the strange energy surges plaguing Warehouse 13. Artifact: James Braid's Chair.
5	5	"Claudia"	Stephen Surjik	Drew Z. Greenberg	July 28, 2009	3.30
Artie gets kidnapped by the source of the warehouse's security breach, Claudia Donovan (Allison Scagliotti). She enlists Artie to help right a wrong from their past; namely, the disappearance of her older brother Joshua, which was caused by an artifact. Meanwhile, Pete and Myka try to uncover his whereabouts, against the wishes of Mrs. Frederic. Artifact: Rheticus's Compass.
6	6	"Elements"	Ken Girotti	Story by : Dana Baratta & Jack Kenny; Teleplay by : Jack Kenny & David Simkins	August 4, 2009	3.31
A thief steals a sculpture with the help of a Native American artifact, and the investigation leads Pete and Myka to discover a sacred place that they deem worthy of protection. Claudia sneaks into the team to protect herself from the organization's "consequences" for her actions. Artifact: Cloak of the Lenape people. Walter Burleigh's Element Statues.
7	7	"Burnout"	Constantine Makris	Matthew Federman & Stephen Scaia	August 11, 2009	3.35
While investigating the site of a presumed gas explosion, Pete and Myka are shocked to discover the body of another Warehouse agent. While considering their eventual fates as agents, they make contact with another ex-agent (Rebecca St. Claire, played by Roberta Maxwell) and find the artifact. Unfortunately, it promptly attaches itself to Pete, making him more aggressive and dangerously electric. Artifact: Spine of the Saracen.
8	8	"Implosion"	Vincent Misiano	Bob Goodman	August 18, 2009	3.27
Pete and Myka return to Washington to intercept a samurai sword that is to be presented to the president, only for it to vanish before they can reach it. While investigating, they butt heads with their previous superior, who reveals an unfortunate chapter of Artie's past. Meanwhile, Artie looks into the whereabouts of James MacPherson, an ex-Warehouse operative whom he believes is involved. Artifact: Honjo Masamune.
9	9	"Duped"	Michael W. Watkins	Ben Raab & Deric A. Hughes	August 25, 2009	2.86
Pete and Myka go to Las Vegas to fetch an artifact that is helping a married couple (played by Eureka's Erica Cerra and Niall Matter) to win at the Casinos, but the mission goes awry when Myka becomes trapped in Lewis Carroll's mirror. Artifacts: Lewis Carroll's Looking Glass, Studio 54 Disco Ball, Jubilee Grand Casino Chip.
10	10	"Regrets"	Michael W. Watkins	Tamara Becher	September 1, 2009	2.93
Artie sends Pete and Myka to a prison in Florida to investigate reports of an unusually high number of unexplained suicides; while performing inventory duty at the warehouse, Claudia discovers a practical use for one of the artifacts without considering the danger involved. Guest-starring Eureka's Joe Morton. Artifacts: Riverton Maximum Security Prison's Quartz Cross, Alessandro Volta's Lab Coat, Tycho Brahe's prosthetic nose, Venus de Milo's arms.
11	11	"Breakdown"	Eric Laneuville	Michael P. Fox & Ian Stokes	September 8, 2009	2.70
After an accident, Pete, Myka, and Claudia are trapped in the warehouse with several artifacts activated and the neutralizer processor jammed. Unfortunately, the only way to fix things in time involves passing through the particularly dangerous "Dark Vault". Meanwhile, Artie is forced to answer for his and MacPherson's actions to his superiors, the Regents, including Benedict Valda (Mark Sheppard). Artifacts: Fort Baylor's Dodgeball, Leena's Bed and Breakfast (The Complete Building), Leena's Bed and Breakfast Painting, Sylvia Plath's Typewriter, Silly String, Snowglobe
12	12	"Nevermore"	Tawnia McKiernan	David Simkins	September 15, 2009	2.93
As the agents search for MacPherson, Myka's father (Michael Hogan) is sent and subsumed by Edgar Allan Poe's notebook. As it is a bifurcated artifact (one with multiple parts), Pete must track down the other half, currently in the hands of an embittered teenage scholar. Artifacts: Edgar Allan Poe's Quill Pen and Notebook, Jack the Ripper's Lantern.
13	13	"MacPherson"	Stephen Surjik	Jack Kenny	September 22, 2009	2.23
Artie, Pete, and Myka discover MacPherson's plan to secretly auction off artifacts, and rush to track down and stop him. Meanwhile, Claudia learns she's had connections with MacPherson in the past, and is accused of being a sleeper agent. Artifacts: The Phoenix, Elagabalus's Goblet of Severan, Timothy Leary's Reading Glasses, Harriet Tubman's Thimble.

== DVD release ==
Warehouse 13: Season One
Set details: 13 episodes; Region 1, 2 & 4 – 4-disc DVD set; Features: Anamorphic Widescreen (1.78:1); Dolby Digital 5.1 English audio; Subtitles English		Bonus features: Four audio commentaries; Pilot Commentary with Cast And Crew; "Claudia" Feature Commentary; "Implosion" Feature Commentary; "MacPherson" Feature Commentary; Featurettes; Artie-Facts; Saul Searching; What's in the Shadows; Ye Olde Curiosity Shoppe; Sneak Peek Warehouse 13 Season 2; Pilot podcast with Saul Rubinek; Deleted scenes; Gag reel	
Release dates:	Region 1	Region 2	Region 4
Release dates:	June 29, 2010	June 28, 2010	March 2, 2011
