= Warehouse 13 season 5 =

Warehouse 13
- Season 5
- DVD cover art
- No. of episodes: 6

Release
- Original network: Syfy
- Original release: April 14 – May 19, 2014

Season chronology
- ← Previous; Season 4

The fifth and final season of the American television series Warehouse 13 premiered on April 14, 2014 and ended on May 19, 2014 on Syfy. The season consists of six episodes. The show stars Eddie McClintock, Joanne Kelly, Saul Rubinek, Allison Scagliotti, and Aaron Ashmore.

== Cast ==
=== Main ===
- Eddie McClintock as Pete Lattimer
- Joanne Kelly as Myka Bering
- Saul Rubinek as Artie Nielsen
- Allison Scagliotti as Claudia Donovan
- Aaron Ashmore as Steve Jinks

=== Special guest ===
- Anthony Stewart Head as Paracelsus

=== Recurring ===
- C. C. H. Pounder as Mrs. Irene Frederic
- Jaime Murray as Helena G. Wells
- Kelly Hu as Abigail Cho
- Chryssie Whitehead as Claire Donovan

=== Guest ===
- Rebecca Mader as Lisa da Vinci
- Lindsay Wagner as Vanessa Calder
- René Auberjonois as Hugo Miller
- Janet Varney as Elise
- Ryan Cartwright as Oswald
- Tori Anderson as Princess
- Erin Way as Katarina
- Paula Garcés as Kelly Hernandez
- Sônia Braga as Alicia
- Mark A. Sheppard as Benedict Valda (Note: Also has an uncredited role in "Endless Terror".)
- Genelle Williams as Leena
- Samm Levine as Scott Moore
- Erick Avari as Catarunga
- Jack Kenny as Jack

== Production ==
On May 16, 2013, it was announced that Warehouse 13 was renewed for a fifth and final season of six episodes to air in 2014. Filming in the Toronto area began on June 24, 2013, and concluded on August 31, 2013.

== Episodes ==
No. overall	No. in season	Title	Directed by	Written by	Original release date	US viewers (millions)
60	1	"Endless Terror"	Jack Kenny	Jack Kenny	April 14, 2014	1.17
Paracelsus takes control of Warehouse 13, intent on recreating the entire world in his image. Pete and Myka must follow him back through time to 1541 and prevent him from killing the Regents and becoming the Warehouses' permanent master. Artifacts: Theodosius of Bithynia's sundial, Karl Schwarzschild's pocket watch, Pierre-Simon Laplace's telescope, arrow of Achilles, Louis XIV's silverware, Joan of Arc's helmet, Sargon the Great's mirrors, William Bleckwenn's stethoscope, Al Capone's dual Tommy guns, stick grenade from Hitler's bunker, African elephant tusk, Black Bart's Cannon, World War II Tessen fan, Lewis Carroll's mirror, spine of the Saracen, Chester Moore Hall's achromatic lens, Jack LaLanne's stationary bike, Orville Wright's aviator goggles, H. G. Wells' time machine, The Duke of Exeter's daughter torture rack spindle, after-image mirror, and the scalpel
61	2	"Secret Service"	Robert Duncan McNeill	Bob Goodman	April 21, 2014	1.15
Pete and Myka investigate a series of victims drowning and run into a pair of Secret Service agents. Artifacts: Bronze baby shoes, Alfred Dreyfus' sword hilt, Frances Farmer's music box, Joseph Pilates' resistance bands, Oliver Sacks' record player, silver necklace from the Atacama Desert mines
62	3	"A Faire to Remember"	Matt Birman	Holly Harold	April 28, 2014	1.08
Pete and Steve search for a dangerous artifact at a Renaissance fair, while Claudia takes a risk to revive her sister from a coma. Artifacts: Mother Shipton's Cards, Bob Dylan's Bus Pass, Alessandro Volta's pail
63	4	"Savage Seduction"	Jack Kenny	Diego Gutierrez	May 5, 2014	0.90
Pete, Myka, and Artie try to help Pete's ex-girlfriend Kelly Hernandez when her grandmother gets trapped inside a telenovela. Still, things go awry when they all end up as characters in the soap opera. Meanwhile, a strange accident at a university leads Claudia and Steve to discover an artifact that duplicates its users. Artifacts: telenovela brooch prop, Edna St. Vincent Millay's two-ended candle, Harvey Korman's cufflinks
64	5	"Cangku Shisi"	Michael McMurray	Benjamin Raab & Deric A. Hughes	May 12, 2014	0.85
Valda tries to move the warehouse to China and uses Claudia's comatose sister Claire as a puppet caretaker. Information on Mrs. Frederic is also revealed - she became the caretaker of Warehouse 13 after her sister was killed in the fire that destroyed the previous Warehouse 13 in 1898. Artifacts: Sir William Edward Parry's frozen statue, Albert Butz's glasses, Oliver Sacks' record player, Chuck Yeager's copy of Melvin Rixton's The Wandering Cowboy record, Charles Atlas's workout trunks, Hiram Abiff's setting maul, The Mason's Compass, The Mason's Square, Julius Wilbrand's buttons, Silly String, Louis XIV's Versailles's Forks. Artifacts are seen during the transfer to WH14: The Washington Monument and The CN Tower from Canada.
65	6	"Endless"	Jack Kenny	John-Paul Nickel	May 19, 2014	1.13
The team struggles with the news from Mrs. Fredric that Warehouse 13 will be moving to a new host country at some point in the near future. Meanwhile, they explore a series of flashbacks via King Arthur's Round Table that build into the eternal emotions of the Warehouse itself. Each member contributes their defining moment as an agent, adding to the lore of the Warehouse. Pete and Myka proclaim their love for each other. The series ends in a flashforward decades into the future, showing Claudia as the new Warehouse Caretaker, as she views the defining moments of her long gone friends. Artifacts: Harriet Tubman's thimble, Jack the Ripper's lantern, King Arthur's Round Table, marquee for 42nd Street from the Mark Strand Theatre, Thomas Wedgwood's champagne glass, Louis XIV's silverware forks, Japanese five-tailed fox statue, H.G. Wells' shrink ray, Busby Berkeley's flask, Goodman beggar's tin pan, a clock, Barack Obama's basketball

== DVD release ==
Warehouse 13: Season Five
Set details: 6 episodes; Region 1, 2 & 4 – 2-disc DVD set; Features: Anamorphic Widescreen (1.78:1); Dolby Digital 5.1 English audio; Subtitles English		Featurettes; "Endless Terror" Podcast with Jack Kenny, Eddie McClintock, and Tom Lieber; "Secret Services" Podcast with Jack Kenny, Eddie McClintock, Robert Duncan McNeill, and Tom Lieber; "A Faire to Remember" Podcast with Jack Kenny, Eddie McClintock, Ryan Cartwright, and Tom Lieber; "Savage Seduction" Podcast with Jack Kenny, Eddie McClintock, and Allison Scagliotti; "Cangku Shisi" Podcast with Jack Kenny, Eddie McClintock, Allison Scagliotti, Benjamin Raab, and Deric A. Hughes; "Endless" Podcast with Jack Kenny, Eddie McClintock, Allison Scagliotti, and John-Paul Nickel; Holiday Episode: "The Greatest Gift"; Warehouse 13: Behind the Shelves; "Endless" Deleted Scenes; Deleted and Extended Scenes; Gag Reel	
Release dates:	Region 1	Region 2	Region 4
Release dates:	May 20, 2014	TBA	TBA
