= Pete Lattimer =

Science fiction TV series character

Peter Lattimer
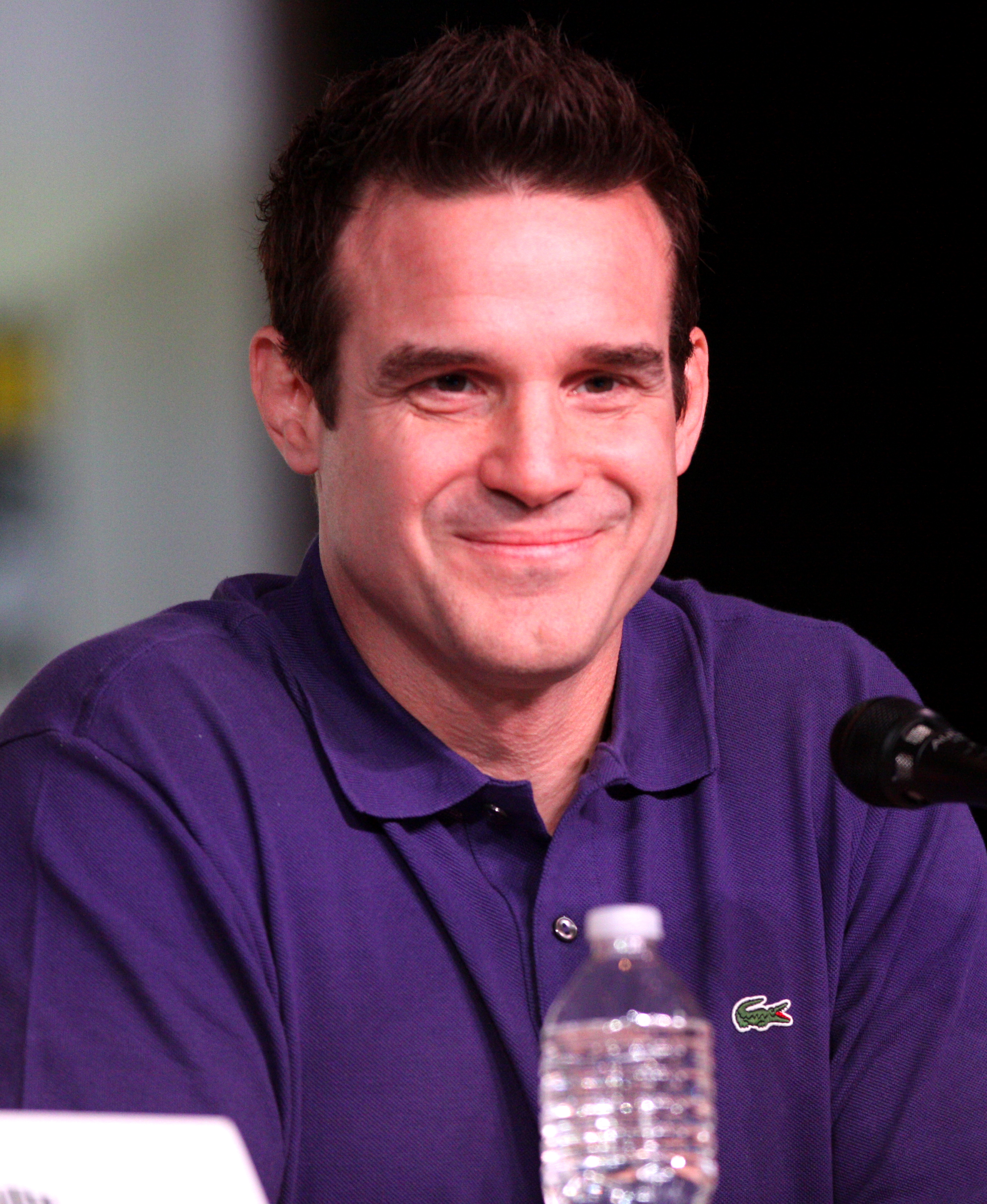
- Lattimer is played by Eddie McClintock
- First appearance: "Pilot"
- Last appearance: "Endless"
- Created by: Jane Espenson
- Portrayed by: Eddie McClintock

In-universe information
- Nickname: Pete
- Occupation: United States Secret Service; Warehouse 13 agent
- Family: Jane Lattimer (mother); M. (or Daniel J.) Lattimer (father, deceased); Jeannie Lattimer (sister)
- Spouse: Amanda (divorced)
- Significant others: Kate Logan; Dr. Kelly Hernandez; Myka Bering

Agent Peter "Pete" Lattimer is a fictional character in the U.S. television science fiction series Warehouse 13 (2009–2014). Portrayed by Eddie McClintock, Agent Lattimer is a co-protagonist of the series alongside Agent Myka Bering (Joanne Kelly). He is a proud Secret Service agent and a quick thinker.

== Character history ==
Pete is a fictional character from North Canton, Ohio. His mother, Jane Lattimer, is a Warehouse Regent. His father, Daniel J. Lattimer, was a firefighter who was killed saving children from a housefire when Pete was 12 years old. Pete is known to wear his father's fire department badge on a chain around his neck. He has an older sister, Jeannie, who is hearing-impaired. Pete is a college graduate from an unknown alma mater, but wears sweaters from Dartmouth College on more than one occasion. He is also an athlete, having competed in college wrestling. Pete is a former U.S. Marine, though little has been revealed about his service record. Pete is divorced, having been briefly married to Amanda, a fellow Marine.

Pete's appearance and courteous disposition come in handy when he needs to charm someone. His uncanny ability to find the lighter side in even the direst situations adds to his charm. When confronted with a potentially dangerous situation, Pete relies on his instincts and is willing to bend the rules if it means getting the job done. His impulsive, intuitive nature often leads him to leap before he looks. He has a sixth sense of impending dangers and a weakness for food (especially cookies). Pete is also an avid comic book fan, collecting every edition of Iron Shadow. In the pilot episode, when Myka creates a ferret she names it after Pete because it is similarly cute and annoying.

In the pilot episode, Pete is living in Washington, D.C., working as a Secret Service agent to protect the president. After a mishap at the National Museum, he is transferred under mysterious circumstances to the remote badlands of South Dakota. There he is given a job at Warehouse 13, along with Myka Bering, to protect and retrieve various powerful artifacts around the world, under the supervision of Artie Nielsen.

Pete is a dedicated agent who is willing to "take a bullet" if necessary. In the season 1 episode "Burnout" he is prepared to sacrifice his life to destroy a dangerous artifact that attaches itself to his spine. Pete also goes to great lengths to protect his fellow agents if he believes they are being threatened — for example, his actions in the season 2 episode "Around the Bend."

Although Pete is a capable Warehouse agent, he has a childish side that he has never grown out of — for instance, seeing how many croissants he can shove into his mouth at once; a feat Myka describes as "actually kind of impressive when you see it." Pete is also intensely curious and has a habit of playing with artifacts, which frequently gets him in trouble. He once described how he put on Abraham Lincoln's hat and was struck with a sudden urge to free Mrs. Frederic.

In the season 3 episode "The 40th Floor", Pete is shocked to learn that his mother is one of the Regents.

In the season 4 premiere "A New Hope", Pete retrieves the missing part of Magellan's Astrolabe at the expense of his own life. With the astrolabe complete, Artie can turn back time and undo Warehouse 13's destruction.

== Skills and abilities ==
Pete has received training from both the Marines and the Secret Service in firearms, personal protection, and investigation. Reluctant to rely solely on formal training, he routinely advocates for using instinct and intuition. His partners and coworkers note that his natural empathy makes him approachable, which is why many of the people he interviews trust his sincerity and open up. As a warehouse agent, he also displays extensive esoteric knowledge, including popular culture and astronomy.

Pete's biggest asset is his "vibes." Pete will often get an intense feeling about a person or situation, which he uses to guide his judgment in the field. Throughout the show, various characters posit that this ability may be either heightened intuition, an ability to sense auras, limited clairvoyance, or precognition. In the "Pilot" episode, he mentions that the first time he got a bad vibe was right before his father left for work the day he died. He feels that he was partly responsible for not telling his father about it and has always paid attention to his vibes since then. In "Reset", Myka asks Pete if he had a lot of bad vibes about Helena; Pete admits that he did, but did not voice his opinion since he trusted Myka's judgment.

The warehouse regents also infer that Pete's unique mix of training, "vibes," and ability to build rapport made him uniquely qualified for working with artifacts and a natural counterbalance to Agent Myka Bering. While Myka focuses on a dedication to facts and fairness, Pete focuses on people and the human dimension to artifact recovery. As such, Pete is intensely loyal to his friends and family, mainly when their safety is at risk.

== Relationships ==
Prior to his father's death, he and Pete had quite a close relationship. They would often go camping, where his father taught Pete the constellations of the night sky. Pete laments that if his father had the chance, he would have been there for every birthday, every Christmas, and every morning Pete woke up.

In episode 2 of season 3, it is revealed that Pete has problems with abandonment, stemming from his father's death when Pete was young. This death led to his mother becoming increasingly active and so unavailable to Pete, who also lamented his sister leaving for college soon. Myka discovers that her departure had a considerable emotional impact on him, acknowledging and apologizing for during the episode.

As is revealed in season 3, episode 4, "Queen for a Day," Pete was previously married. His ex-wife, Amanda (Jeri Ryan), is a career Marine and is now a Major. During the episode, Pete explains that he was too young and that Amanda was always far more focused than he. Although the marriage ended in divorce, they maintain an amicable relationship. Both accept a share of the blame for the failed marriage, Pete for his drinking and Amanda for her ambition.

As revealed in season 2, episode 6, Pete once had a romantic affair with a fellow Secret Service Agent Kate Logan (Tia Carrere).

Pete's playful nature allows him to quickly develop a rapport with the teenage Claudia Donovan upon her arrival at Warehouse 13. Over the series, they form an older brother and younger sister relationship, and they have a habit of messing around on the job together.

Leena thinks Pete is kind of sexy, and when Pete interacts with an anatomically accurate virtual reality version of Leena, he can't keep his eyes off her breasts. Nonetheless, there is no indication either has ever acted on the attraction.

In season 2, Pete has a romance with Univille veterinarian Dr. Kelly Hernandez. He admits to being in love with Kelly, is considering moving in with her, and is prepared to make her his "one," i.e., the one person with whom he is allowed to reveal the true nature of his work at Warehouse 13. In season 2, episode 12, when Kelly falls under the influence of Lizzie Borden’s compact, because of Helena G. Wells, she tries to kill Pete with an ax before the artifact is neutralized in the nick of time. Having come to Univille seeking a quiet and simple life, Kelly can't deal with the drama of what just transpired. Thus she ends her relationship with Pete and leaves town.

After a brief initial attraction, Pete has a poor relationship with H.G. Wells, apparently never fully trusting her even after she’s reinstated as a Warehouse agent in season 2. In season 3, episode 5, Pete has the most adverse reaction to the arrival of the H.G. hologram, using most of the opportunities he can to belittle her. Despite Myka's efforts to stop this, it is only at the end of the episode that he starts to mellow somewhat on H.G. Pete finally embraces H.G. (literally) in the season 3 finale after H.G. demonstrates through her actions that her commitment to the good of the Warehouse is genuine.

Throughout the series, Pete and Myka develop a deep platonic relationship. Although Pete confessed he finds Myka stunningly beautiful, he describes her as his best friend, while Myka describes Pete as the big brother she never had and an extraordinary partner. Despite their feelings for each other, Myka’s by-the-book approach and Pete’s off-the-cuff style often causes conflict between them; however, they’ve learned to appreciate each other’s strengths and work together exceptionally well as a team. Throughout season 5, he realizes that he is in love with Myka, and they finally kiss in the series finale.

== Alcoholism ==
Like McClintock, Pete is a recovering alcoholic—his last drink was in 2002.

=== Season One ===
- "Pilot" (1x01): After the mishap at the natural history museum, Pete's boss Daniel Dickinson, who well knows Pete's history with substance abuse, forces him to perform a urinalysis after Lattimer tells him about the mystical experience he had with the thief that stole the Aztec rock.
- "Pilot" (1x01): After arriving at Warehouse 13, Artie asks Pete if he'd like milk or juice with his cookies, to which Pete replies, "You know what I'd really like?", to which Artie replies "Oh, I do indeed, but falling off the wagon may not be the best option at this point." Realizing the awkwardness of the situation, Artie quickly changes subjects, much to Pete's relief.
- "Magnetism" (1x03): While on a job in the fictional town of Unionville, Colorado he sits uneasily at a bar while working and talking to Artie on his Farnsworth. The bartender notices Pete's uneasiness and his glaring at the various liquor bottles and kindly gives him a local location AA meeting.
- "Duped" (1x08): Pete confronts a suspect who's using an artifact to win big in Las Vegas. "This one seems to be a bit addictive," he tells her, "and we both know that that's bad, right?"

=== Season Two ===
- "Around the Bend" (2x06): Lattimer becomes erratic and delusional after playing with many artifacts, causing Myka to think he has relapsed. So she, along with Artie, Claudia Donovan, and Leena, give him an intervention.
- "Merge with Caution" (2x08): Pete and Myka's attempt to have a typical weekend is ruined when they are affected by an artifact that causes them to switch bodies. Unfortunately for Pete, he enters Myka's body after she had consumed a few drinks at her 10-year high school reunion. The experience causes Lattimer to feel drunk for the first time in eight years. He states that it will "be hard to explain at [his] next AA meeting."

=== Season Three ===
- "Love Sick" (3x03): Lattimer passes out after being affected by W. C. Fields's juggling balls, which induce drunkenness and blackouts in the user. He later laments that it seems like every other artifact he finds has intoxicating effects that make him want to call his sponsor.
- "Queen for a Day" (3x04): While meeting his ex-wife Amanda for the first time in several years, he apologizes to her for never making amends.

=== Season Four ===
- "The Big Snag" (4x13): When Myka suggests keeping a low profile, Pete pulls her onto the dance floor. "You call this keeping a low profile?" asks Myka. "Well, everyone's either dancing or drinking," responds Pete, "and drinking's not an option."
- "The Sky's the Limit" (4x14): A witness tells Pete and Myka that "after the tequila fountain at the pool, it's a little fuzzy." Pete remarks, "I remember that feeling. I was fuzzy for about twelve years."
- "What Matters Most" (4x17): Lattimer is nearly killed by a "karma" artifact. Its effects were broken only after Lattimer confessed and apologized about a DUI-incident in which he lost control of his car but managed to walk away unscathed. However, Dave, his best friend, was thrown from the vehicle and broke both his legs. Lattimer commented on the event as being the lowest point in his life, and he never drank again.
