= Warehouse 13 season 2 =

Warehouse 13
- Season 2
- DVD cover art
- No. of episodes: 13

Release
- Original network: Syfy
- Original release: July 6 – December 7, 2010

Season chronology
- ← Previous; Season 1 Next → Season 3

The second season of the American television series Warehouse 13 premiered on July 6, 2010, and concluded on December 7, 2010, on Syfy. Season two maintained the Tuesdays at 9:00 pm ET timeslot from the previous season. The season consisted of 13 episodes. The show stars Eddie McClintock, Joanne Kelly, Saul Rubinek, Genelle Williams and Allison Scagliotti.

== Synopsis ==
Season two begins right after the events of the season finale of season one. Pete and Myka find that Artie has survived the explosion thanks to the Phoenix artifact, which was slipped into his pocket by MacPherson during their struggle. Though the Phoenix saves Artie from the explosion, in exchange, it causes Mrs. Frederic's driver to die and then explode, with Mrs. Frederic barely surviving by jumping out of the car before the explosion. While still under MacPherson's control, Leena locates another past Warehouse agent named H.G. Wells. She reverses the bronzing process, freeing her to assist MacPherson in penetrating the Escher Vault inside the Warehouse. Wells eventually turns on MacPherson and kills him after taking an artifact from the Vault. Mrs. Frederic realizes that Leena was the one stealing Artifacts from the Warehouse for MacPherson while under the Pearl of Wisdom's control and helps remove the artifact from Leena's brain. Later, when Artie starts seeing MacPherson over the Warehouse, Leena explains that the visions may indicate that he has some unfinished business with MacPherson. Meanwhile, Leena keeps having vertigo, and it is revealed that her condition is due to residual energy from MacPherson trapped in her brain, which Mrs. Frederic and The Regents removed.

Later in season two, H.G. Wells returns and starts helping them collect artifacts and is reinstated as an agent, which annoys Artie since he doesn't trust her. After Warehouse 2 is reactivated, Mrs. Frederic starts to have visions of Warehouse 2 that are slowly killing her. In the event of Mrs. Frederic's death, Claudia finds out that she would then take over as the new Warehouse caretaker, which upsets her. Pete, Myka, H.G., and Benedict Valda attempt to deactivate Warehouse 2, and so the other can continue onward, Valda ends up sacrificing himself. When they finally deactivate Warehouse 2, they find out that H.G. was looking for Warehouse 2 so she could get the Minoan Trident and create another ice age. Myka and Artie track H.G. down and stop her from causing another ice age. Due to the preceding events, Myka realizes that she was wrong to trust H.G. and resigns as a warehouse agent, worrying that the mistake will haunt her and keep her from being an effective agent.

== Cast ==
=== Main ===
- Eddie McClintock as Pete Lattimer
- Joanne Kelly as Myka Bering
- Saul Rubinek as Artie Nielsen
- Genelle Williams as Leena
- Allison Scagliotti as Claudia Donovan

=== Recurring ===
- C. C. H. Pounder as Mrs. Irene Frederic
- Roger Rees as James MacPherson
- Jaime Murray as Helena G. Wells
- Paula Garcés as Kelly Hernandez
- Nolan Gerard Funk as Todd
- Mark A. Sheppard as Benedict Valda

=== Guest ===
- Sean Maher as Sheldon
- Jewel Staite as Loretta
- Neil Grayston as Douglas Fargo
- Philip Winchester as Raymond St. James
- Faran Tahir as Adwin Kosan
- Tia Carrere as Kate Logan
- Lindsay Wagner as Dr. Vanessa Calder
- René Auberjonois as Hugo Miller
- David Anders as Jonah Raitt
- Tawny Cypress as Romana
- Cody Rhodes as Kurt Smoller
- Simon Reynolds as Daniel Dickinson
- Laura Harris as Lauren Andrews
- Armin Shimerman as Charlie Martin
- Judd Hirsch as Isadore Weisfelt
- Paul Blackthorne as Larry Newley

== Production ==
On August 20, 2009, Warehouse 13 was renewed for a second season. The second season consists of 13 episodes and started airing on July 6, 2010. Season two marked the first crossover event with fellow Syfy series Eureka. Douglas Fargo (Neil Grayston) from Eureka appeared in the August 3, 2010 episode of Warehouse 13, while Claudia Donovan (Allison Scagliotti) appeared on Eureka on August 6, 2010. In December 2010 there was a standalone Christmas episode. Each episode contains hidden references to one of the twelve signs of the Zodiac. This was promoted using an online competition "Hunt for the Zodiac Sweepstakes".

== Episodes ==
No. overall	No. in season	Title	Directed by	Written by	Original release date	US viewers (millions)
14	1	"Time Will Tell"	Stephen Surjik	Jack Kenny	July 6, 2010	2.96
MacPherson frees H.G. Wells (Jaime Murray) and escapes the Warehouse with the aid of Leena (using mind control). The agents track MacPherson and Wells back to the warehouse, where Wells turns on MacPherson. Artifacts: H.G. Wells's Imperceptor Vest, H.G. Wells's Antigravity Generator, the Pearl of Wisdom, Dante Alighieri's Death Mask.
15	2	"Mild Mannered"	Constantine Makris	Benjamin Raab & Deric A. Hughes	July 13, 2010	2.33
After Sheldon (Sean Maher), a Detroiter, finds an artifact that seemingly grants him superpowers, he begins a vigilante crusade to stop the crime that is threatening the city and Loretta (Jewel Staite), the woman he loves. Claudia must reconcile with Leena after MacPherson's manipulations. Artifacts: Rasputin’s prayer belt, Jack Kirby’s belt, Charles Atlas's Workout Trunks.
16	3	"Beyond Our Control"	Constantine Makris	David Simkins	July 20, 2010	2.28
Mrs. Frederic calls in the Regents to have a look at Leena. Pete, Myka, and Claudia search for an artifact that is projecting B-movie clips into the real world. Artifact: Philo Farnsworth's Three Dimensional Projector.
17	4	"Age Before Beauty"	Tawnia McKiernan	Andrew Kreisberg	July 27, 2010	2.48
Pete and Myka go undercover in the fashion industry to find an artifact causing models to age years in a few seconds. Artie helps Claudia with her misgivings about going on a date with Todd (Nolan Gerard Funk), a guy working in the local hardware store. Artifact: Man Ray's Camera, King Arthur's Excalibur.
18	5	"13.1"	Chris Fisher	Ian Stokes	August 3, 2010	2.74
In this crossover with Eureka, Dr. Douglas Fargo (Neil Grayston) is enlisted to upgrade the Warehouse's computer system. However, Fargo proves to be more harm than help when his "upgrade" causes the Warehouse to go into lockdown, trapping everyone inside. Pete and Myka have to locate the man who designed the security system, Hugo Miller (René Auberjonois), and bring him back to the Warehouse to save the day. Artifact: Max Wertheimer's Zoetrope, Stone tablets from Babel
19	6	"Around the Bend"	Tawnia McKiernan	Bob Goodman	August 10, 2010	2.79
Pete has a secret assignment and runs into former flame Kate Logan (Tia Carrere), which may result in him betraying the team. Is Regent Benedict Valda (Mark Sheppard) threatening the Warehouse? Artifacts: Telegraph Island's Telegraph, General Laverlong's Elephant Walking Stick, Tito Puente's Original Studio Master of "Oye Como Va".
20	7	"For the Team"	Tawnia McKiernan	Drew Z. Greenberg	August 17, 2010	2.34
Claudia has just been given her first assignment as a Warehouse apprentice, but it involves a real human torch and her first encounter with H.G. Wells. Could it be too much for her to handle? Not to mention an appearance by Dr. Vanessa Calder (Lindsay Wagner), an old love of Artie's. Artifact: Godfrid Haraldsson's Spoon.
21	8	"Merge with Caution"	Anton Cropper	Nell Scovell	August 24, 2010	2.36
Pete and Myka's attempt to have a typical weekend is ruined when they are affected by an artifact that causes them to switch bodies. Elsewhere, Claudia and Artie have a mission of their own (guest star: Laura Harris). Artifact: Robert Louis Stevenson's Bookends, Mata Hari's Stockings.
22	9	"Vendetta"	Matt Earl Beesley	Michael P. Fox	August 31, 2010	2.40
Artie, Pete, and Myka travel to Russia to track down a man they believe is after Artie's relatives. Claudia discovers that Todd is in the witness protection program. H.G. Wells is reinstated as a warehouse agent. This is the introduction of Adwin Kosan (the head regent), played by Faran Tahir. Artifacts: Tomás de Torquemada's Chain, Driftwood from the Titanic, Charles II's Croquet Balls.
23	10	"Where and When"	Stephen Cragg	Drew Z. Greenberg & Andrew Kreisberg	September 7, 2010	2.49
Pete and Myka, with the assistance of H.G. Wells, use her time machine to travel back to 1961 to solve a case. Artifact: Cinderella's Knife.
24	11	"Buried" (Part 1)	Stephen Surjik	Robyn Adams & Mike Johnson	September 14, 2010	2.38
When the lost Warehouse 2 in Egypt is reactivated, causing Mrs. Frederic to become ill, Pete, Myka, and H.G. meet Valda in Egypt and travel to Warehouse 2 in an attempt to shut it down and save her. Artifacts: Spirit-Force of Warehouse 2, Ankh Charm, Neural Assessor, Descending Ceiling Trap, Flaming Pendulum Trap, Medusa-Saltas Trap, Constellation Lock, Mental Transfer Band, Stun Gun
25	12	"Reset" (Part 2)	Constantine Makris	Jack Kenny & Nell Scovell	September 21, 2010	2.40
Wells' attack in Egypt has set into motion the plan she has been secretly orchestrating for more than one hundred years. When it becomes clear that Wells has her hands on the original weapon of mass destruction, Artie, Claudia, and Mrs. Frederic race against the clock to stop her deadly endgame. Artifacts: Carpet, 10 Original Books of Plato, Rod of Asclepius, The Minoan Trident, the Wings of Daedalus, Pitch Lake's Primordial Tar, Lizzie Borden's Compact, The Corsican Brothers' Vest.
26	13	"Secret Santa"	Jack Kenny	Bob Goodman	December 7, 2010	2.01
While Pete and Myka go to Los Angeles to investigate a timely Christmas-related artifact, Claudia searches for the perfect gift for Artie. Artifact: Christmas Truce Tree Ornament. Note: Chronologically this episode takes place after "Merge with Caution" but before "Vendetta".

== DVD release ==
Warehouse 13: Season Two
Set details: 12 episodes; Region 1 & 4 – 3-disc DVD set; Region 2 - 4-disc DVD set; Features: Anamorphic Widescreen (1.78:1); Dolby Digital 5.1 English audio; Subtitles English		Bonus features: Three audio commentaries; "Time Will Tell" Commentary; "Merge With Caution" Commentary; "Reset" Commentary; Featurettes; A Thrilleromedy; A Stitch in Time; Designing the Warehouse; "Crossing Over" Eureka cross over episode; Video Blogs; Photo Gallery; Deleted scenes; Gag reel	
Release dates:	Region 1	Region 2	Region 4
Release dates:	June 28, 2011	September 19, 2011	TBA
