= Myka Bering =

Fictional character on American television science fiction series Warehouse 13

- Warehouse 13 character
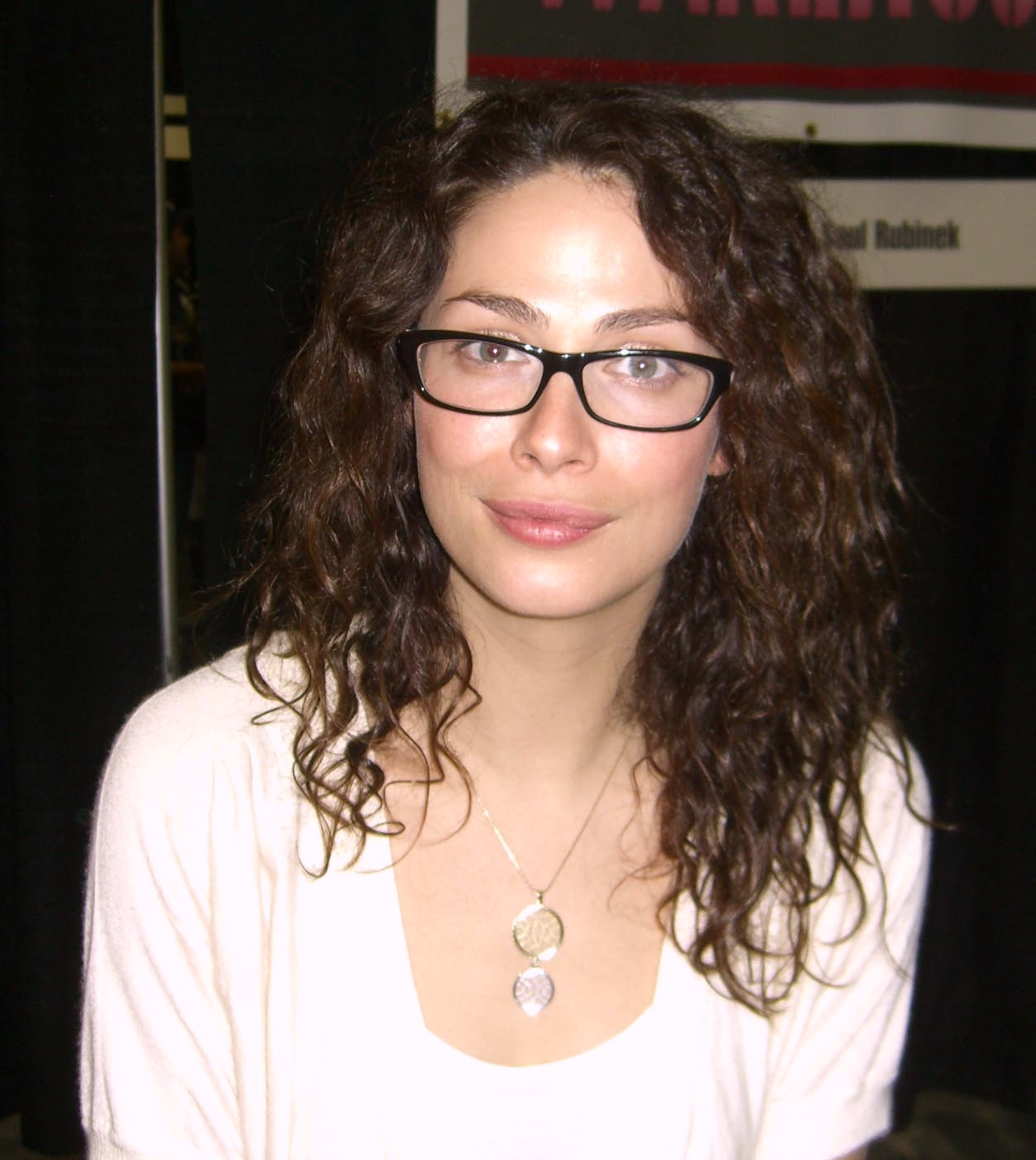
- Bering is played by Joanne Kelly
- First appearance: "Pilot"
- Last appearance: "Endless"
- Created by: Jane Espenson
- Portrayed by: Joanne Kelly

In-universe information
- Nickname: Mykes
- Gender: Female
- Occupation: United States Secret Service; Warehouse 13 agent
- Family: Warren Bering (father); Jeannie Bering (mother); Tracy (sister)
- Significant others: Sam Martino; Helena G. Wells; Pete Lattimer
- Nationality: American

Myka Ophelia Bering is a fictional character on the U.S. television science fiction series, Warehouse 13 (2009–2014), portrayed by Joanne Kelly. With co-protagonist Agent Pete Lattimer (Eddie McClintock), Bering is a U.S. Secret Service agent. Both have been seconded to the titular Warehouse 13, where their work involves collecting artifacts under conditions of highest classification secrecy. In opposition to her partner's happy-go-lucky attitude and reliance on intuition, Myka is smart, organized, and has a careful eye for detail.

== Character history ==
Bering (born c.1982) is from Colorado Springs, Colorado, where her parents live. Early on in her life Myka's parents opened a bookstore called, "Bering and Sons". Even though she has no brothers, the 'and Sons' is only added to make the establishment sound classier. She has one sister, Tracy, who Myka describes as "the pretty one" that all the boys were crazy about. Unlike her sister, Myka is a tomboy ; as a teenager, one of her hobbies was fencing. She also enjoys books and is an avid reader. Myka attended Lincoln High School in Colorado Springs and graduated in 2000. She is a college graduate and was Pre-med and Pre-law at some point before being recruited into the Secret Service; at least one of these qualifications was obtained at the University of Colorado She has at least two tattoos, one on her right ankle and another on the inside.

Organized and focused, Myka believes in hard work, solid planning, and steadfast execution. She never met a meticulously detailed mission outline she didn't like. Her attention to minutiae leads to her status as a rising star in the Secret Service, despite a classified "situation" in Denver Colorado. Reassigned to Washington DC, Myka serves as an agent on presidential security detail.

An order dated May 11, 2009, is sent to Chief Supervisor Daniel Dickinson, Myka's boss, ordering her immediate transfer to an undisclosed location from her branch in presidential security. The transfer is classified as top secret, and the authorization comes from a single name, "Frederic." Following the instructions given to her, Myka finds herself in the badlands of South Dakota assigned as an agent to Warehouse 13 with a new boss, Artie Nielsen, and a new partner, Pete Lattimer. Her job is to gather and protect mysterious and powerful artifacts that threaten the world.

The new assignment is not the career path she envisioned, and thus she initially resists. However, over time she learns the importance of the job and grows to enjoy the work and the companionship of her fellow agents. In the season 2 episode "Buried", Myka realizes the warehouse is her happiest place.

Beginning with the season 2 episode "For the Team", Myka builds a relationship with the previously de-bronzed Helena G. Wells. Helena eventually wins Myka over and gains an ally in her bid to be reinstated as a warehouse agent. In the season 2 finale, "Reset", Myka's trust is betrayed when Helena uses the Warehouse to acquire the Minoan Trident, the world's first weapon of mass destruction. Myka plays a pivotal role in her capture, but not before Wells nearly causes a planetary disaster.

Shaken by her lapse in judgment concerning H.G. Wells and filled with doubt about her future effectiveness as warehouse agent, Myka resigns from her job – a painful decision for her. At the start of season three, Myka is back in Colorado working at her father's bookstore. After Pete comes to Myka to solve a recent case, she returns to the Warehouse and is reinstated to her former position.

In season 4 episode What Matters Most, Myka is diagnosed with ovarian cancer during a routine physical required for all agents.

== Skills and abilities ==
Myka has received training from both civilian law enforcement and the Secret Service in firearms, personal protection, and investigation. Reluctant to rely solely on gut instinct, she routinely advocates using formal deduction and investigative work. Because of this her partners and coworkers note that her "by the book" mentality and professionalism has made her exceptional at closing cases, and why many of the people she interviews confess due to overwhelming evidence. As a warehouse agent, she has also displayed extensive knowledge, including literature, history, science, and mathematics, making her the primary investigator in the field.

Myka's biggest asset is her attention to detail; she is cited as having a photographic memory in the episode "Beyond Our Control", being able to recall minute details from the Farnsworth schematics to repair a projector artifact. Myka is an expert martial artist, although the specific discipline she studied is never specified. She is also adept at sword fighting, saying, "some girls played with Barbies, other girls took fencing lessons." In addition to English, she speaks French, Russian, Japanese, and Latin. She reads at least some Arabic, Chinese, and Portuguese. In a deleted scene from the episode "Vendetta", she is heard telling Artie in the background that she speaks French, Italian, and Spanish.

The warehouse regents consider Myka's training, deductive skills , and memory makes her qualified for artifact work and a counterbalance to Agent Pete Lattimer. While Pete is more focused on people and the human dimension to artifact recovery, Myka focuses on results, facts, and fairness. As such, Myka is intensely dedicated to the mission, even at the cost of great personal sacrifice.

== Relationships ==
Aside from a past love affair with Sam Martino, there is little evidence of close personal relationships in Myka's past before she arrives at Warehouse 13. As we see glimpses into her past, she is portrayed as a person who is somewhat cold and distant from those around her. In the episode "Age Before Beauty", we learn that Myka was the unpopular sibling, her sister being the well-liked one. In "Merge with Caution", when Myka arrives at her ten-year high school reunion, she is not well remembered. While attending a reunion social gathering, we see Myka sitting alone at the bar drinking vodka tonics. Aside from a brief encounter with Kurt Smoller, there is no interaction between her and her former classmates. Myka even turns down an offer from Kurt to join the group of friends he is sitting with, hinting that her past association with Kurt's friends was unpleasant. In the episode "The Greatest Gift" we see Myka in an alternate reality, brought about by Pete's interaction with an artifact, where she is a Secret Service agent still working in Washington, D.C. Pete finds Myka sitting alone in a bar on Christmas Eve and tries to convince her that they're partners in another reality. Pete tells her that his Myka is surrounded by people who love her, to which she responds, "I have friends," but it is clear Myka realizes that she doesn't have any true friends.

Throughout season one, Myka gradually develops close relationships with her new Warehouse colleagues. For the first time in her life, Myka builds friendship and love with those who surround her. The coming together as a family of Myka, Pete, Artie, Claudia, and Leena is a theme that runs throughout the second season. In the season 3 episode "Trials", Myka explains to the Regents her reason for returning to the Warehouse... "The world has joy in it when you find a place that allows you to experience that joy. When you find people that make you feel safe and loved, like you belong. You don't walk away from it. You fight for it."

Jeannie Bering (Susan Hogan). Myka's mother, Jeannie, appears in the season 1 episode "Nevermore" and then again briefly in "The Greatest Gift". However, Myka and Jeannie do not interact in the latter episode. While Myka's problems with her father are well known to season one audiences, her relationship with Jeannie has gone largely undeveloped. By all outward appearances, they have a normal mother-daughter relationship.

Warren Bering (Michael Hogan). Myka's father, Warren, was a very demanding parent, which resulted in a strained and troubled relationship between him and his daughter. In the season 1 episode "Nevermore", Myka receives word that Warren is dying and rushes to Colorado to see him. It is discovered that he is under the influence of a bifurcated artifact and is saved when the two parts of the artifact are brought back together. The incident brings Myka and her father back together, allowing them to make amends and renew a relationship.

Tracy Bering (Amy Acker). Myka's younger sister, Tracy, is mentioned in the episodes "Age Before Beauty" and "No Pain, No Gain". It is revealed that Myka harbors some jealousy towards her sister because, as Myka explains, "She's the cheerleader and the homecoming queen; you know, she was the one that all the boys were crazy about." Pete comforts Myka by telling her that she's a stunningly beautiful woman and that it's her sister who should be jealous. Tracy is first seen in the season 4 episode "The Ones You Love" when Myka frees her from the influence of an artifact.

Kurt Smoller (Cody Rhodes). In the season 2 episode "Merge with Caution", we see that Myka had a high school crush on the captain of the football team, Kurt, who she tutored in math. Chemistry develops between them at their ten-year reunion, though it is Myka's body inhabited by Pete's mind, caused by a body-swapping artifact. After returning to her body, Myka sees Kurt and some of the previous day's chemistry still exists. They exchange a kiss and agree to stay in touch.

Sam Martino (Gabriel Hogan). As a Secret Service agent stationed in Denver, Colorado, Myka is partnered with Sam, with whom she builds a romantic relationship. At the time, Sam is married but separated from his wife. He is murdered while on assignment, and, for some time, Myka feels partly responsible, believing she acted too slowly to save him. She is stricken with guilt and grief over Sam's death until she acknowledges that she had not been responsible and that Sam had been at fault for not following their plan to corner a criminal named Leo Bock. In the season 3 episode "Past Imperfect", Myka learns that a fellow agent conspired with Leo to murder Sam, aided by an artifact that could temporarily freeze time. Both Leo and his accomplice are killed, thus finally bringing closure for Myka.

Zach Adanto (J. August Richard) and Jim (Yancey Arias). Former colleagues at the Denver Secret Service, Zach, and Jim, worked with Myka on the Leo Bock case. In "Past Imperfect", Myka again enlists their help when she spots Leo in Denver while working on an unrelated case. Although they work together as professionals, it is portrayed that they are not necessarily friendly. Zach and Jim describe Myka as "Still impulsive and emotional"... "Classic Myka." It is discovered that Jim was Leo's accomplice in Sam's murder. In separate shooting incidents, Zach takes the lives of both.

Daniel Dickinson (Simon Reynolds). Dickinson is Myka's supervisor at the Washington, D.C. Secret Service. He considers Myka to be one of his best agents and a rising star, stating that "she's going places." They maintain a good relationship even after Myka's departure, at least until Artie forces them to sever contact because of Warehouse security demands. Myka is very saddened by Dickinson's death in the season 2 episode "Vendetta".

Pete Lattimer (Eddie McClintock). As co-protagonists, Pete and Myka spend more time on screen together than any other characters. They initially clash with one another in the "Pilot" episode as they work together on a case in Washington, D.C. Still, after Mrs. Frederic recruits both to work at Warehouse 13, they try to get along. Myka is at first annoyed by Pete's childlike nature and off-the-cuff style, which clashes with her by-the-book approach; however, after season one, she begins to find Pete's manner less annoying and more endearing. Over time they draw close and come to discover that their differences make them stronger when paired together. By the end of season 2, Pete and Myka have become the best of friends. Pete displays an innate ability to bring out of Myka a happy, fun-loving side, rather than always being the uptight and isolated person she was when they first met. In the Season 2 finale "Reset", upon leaving the Warehouse, Myka writes in her resignation letter that Pete is the big brother she never had. But the way Pete reacts, running out of the Warehouse in a futile attempt to catch her, almost in tears, suggests that he thinks of her as more than a sister. When she returns in season 3, Myka describes Pete to the Regents as "an extraordinary partner." In the season 3 episode "Love Sick" after waking up naked in bed together with no memory of what happened, both declare, "I don't think of you that way." Pete reassures Myka that she's his partner and best friend, and nothing, not even having sex and forgetting about it, will change that. They later learn, to Myka's relief, that nothing happened between them. Nevertheless, their relationship continues to evolve in season 4 and 5. By the end of season 5, in the episode "Endless," they decide to explore their developing feelings for each other.

Mrs. Frederic (C. C. H. Pounder). Myka's first meeting with Mrs. Frederic takes place off-screen, when Myka is recruited to join the Warehouse in the "Pilot" episode. Mrs. Frederic is a character that doesn't allow close personal friendships to develop between her and the agents that work for her. Nonetheless, she and Myka are as close to friends as possible, and there is a strong bond of loyalty and respect between them. In the episode "The New Guy", Mrs. Frederic gets Myka to return to the Warehouse by bringing H. G. Wells to her, where Helena tells Myka, "Don't walk away from your truth."

Artie Nielsen (Saul Rubinek). During much of the first season, Myka and Artie have a strained relationship, which is explored in the episode "Duped". She believes Artie's secrecy and withholding of information put her at risk whenever she goes out into the field. In spite of everything, she likes Artie and thinks he's great. After explaining her feelings to him, the relationship improves. They clash again in season 2 episodes "Vendetta" and "Where and When" after Myka advocates for the reinstatement of H. G. Wells, a decision Artie adamantly opposes. The incident causes friction between them, but the relationship soon returns to normal. Despite their disagreements, Myka and Artie develop a deep affection for each other, which is frequently on display: In "Time Will Tell", Myka reacts with joy upon seeing Artie rise from the ashes of the exploded umbilicus and, in "Age Before Beauty", Artie is deeply troubled when Myka falls victim to a rapid aging artifact. We also witness Artie's emotion in "The New Guy" upon seeing that Myka has returned to the Warehouse, simply uttering "Good" with a satisfying smile on his face.

(ferret) Pete. Created by an artifact in the "Pilot" episode, Myka adopts a pet ferret, for which she has a soft spot. It is revealed in the episode "Duped" that she named the ferret Pete after her partner because "they're both cute but annoying." Ferret Pete has not been seen since the pilot but is occasionally mentioned.

Leena (Genelle Williams). Although Leena is the least developed of the main characters, she shares a strong bond of affection with the others and is often seen in a maternal role. Interaction between her and Myka is always portrayed as friendly and caring. While in the field, Myka and Pete frequently turn to Leena as a reliable source of information and research. When off duty at the B&B, Leena is a regular member of the social group. When Leena is killed, Myka is one of the most heavily affected other than Artie.

Claudia Donovan (Allison Scagliotti). Myka has developed a big sister relationship with Claudia, which began to mature in season 2. Myka is an important mentor to Claudia on her first field assignment in the season 2 episode "For The Team" and tricks her into believing in herself. Recognizing Claudia's potential, Myka has been very encouraging towards her. Her belief in Claudia is reinforced when Myka writes in her season 2 resignation letter, "I wish I could be there to see you grow into the amazing woman you're going to become." Myka and the entire Warehouse often rely on Claudia's inventive ingenuity to devise gadgets to help get out of various predicaments.

Helena G. Wells (Jaime Murray). Myka's relationship with Helena (aka, H.G.) is likely the most complex of the series. Initially warned off by Artie from having any interaction with her, Myka begins to build a friendship with Helena in season 2, keeping their interactions a secret from the rest of the Warehouse team as seen in the episodes "For The Team" and "Vendetta", the two women quickly develop respect, admiration, and understanding of one another. Myka is angered and hurt when Helena betrays the Warehouse at the end of season 2, but when she shows remorse for what she's done, Myka again befriends her in season 3. Actress Joanne Kelly has stated that Myka and Helena "fell in love a little bit." Their developing mutual love and affection culminates in Helena's self-sacrifice to save Myka, Pete and Artie from an explosion in the season 3 finale, "Stand". Myka is visibly heartbroken over the death of Helena. Helena's sacrifice and death are wiped from existence in the season 4 premiere, "A New Hope", when Artie uses a failsafe artifact to prevent the explosion and reverse the Warehouse's destruction.

Steve Jinks (Aaron Ashmore). There is little on-screen interaction between Myka and Steve, as Steve is mainly seen as a partner to Claudia. However, it is portrayed that they share a friendship and good working relationship, with Steve becoming a member of the Warehouse family. Myka is grief-stricken over Steve's murder in the season 3 episodes "Emily Lake" and "Stand". She is also the first to figure out his connection to Claudia and the artifact in Season 4, indicating she pays more attention to him than the others (except Claudia).
