= Artie Nielsen =

Fictional character on American television science fiction series Warehouse 13

Arthur "Artie" Nielsen
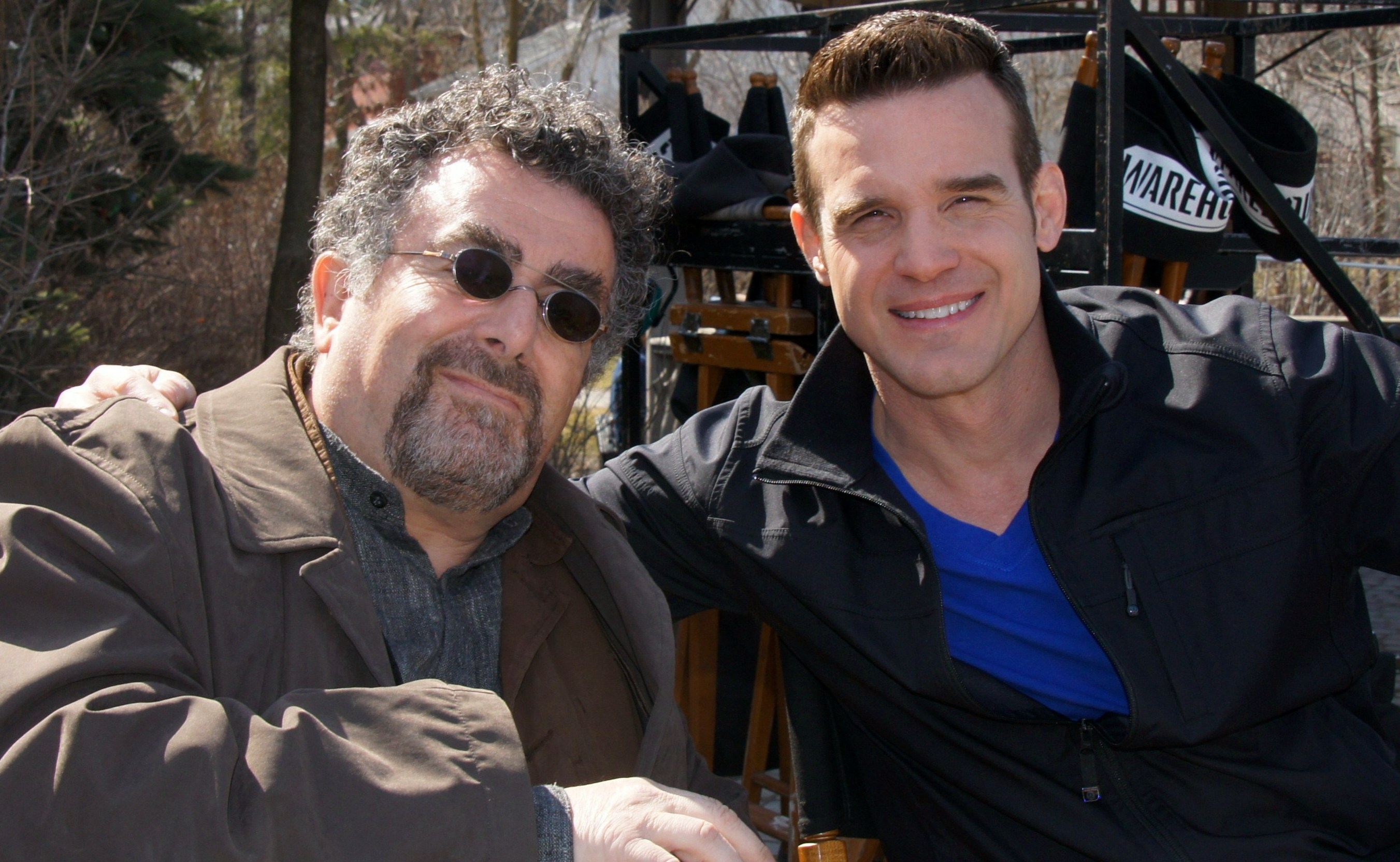
- Artie was played by Saul Rubinek (left), pictured with Eddie McClintock on the set of Warehouse 13.
- First appearance: Pilot
- Last appearance: "Endless"
- Created by: Jane Espenson
- Portrayed by: Saul Rubinek

In-universe information
- Nickname: Artie
- Occupation: Cryptographer; Warehouse 13 agent
- Family: Izzy Weisfelt (father)
- Children: Scott Mohr (son)

Agent Arthur "Artie" Nielsen (née Arthur Weisfelt) is a fictional character on the U.S. television science fiction series Warehouse 13 (2009–2014), portrayed by Saul Rubinek. He is the Special Agent in Charge of Warehouse 13 and is the immediate supervisor of Agents Pete Lattimer, Myka Bering and Claudia Donovan.

== Character history ==
Artie Nielsen was born Arthur Weisfelt on July 2, 1948 and grew up in Philadelphia, Pennsylvania. He has Russian Jewish heritage. His father, Izzy Weisfelt (Judd Hirsch), taught musical composition at Temple University. The young Artie was a gifted pianist and earned admission to the Juilliard School. Rather than continuing his musical training, he went to work for the National Security Agency (NSA). He stands 5 feet 8 inches tall, and in addition to English, he is fluent in Russian, German and French. He can also read Latin. As chief custodian of Warehouse 13, Artie understands many of its secrets.

As revealed in the season 1 episode "Implosion", the NSA recruited Artie right out of school. While in his 20s, he worked as a cryptographer and code breaker, decoding Soviet communications and intercepting letters and phone transcripts. He was suspected of selling secrets to the Soviets when he contacted one of the persons they were spying on. He was put under surveillance, and on November 18, 1978, an arrest warrant was issued for him on charges of espionage and treason.

In the season 2 episode "Vendetta", it is revealed that Artie was trading artifacts in exchange for the release of family members who are political prisoners in the Gulag. He believed the artifacts were nothing more than trinkets, antiques, and ancient relics. When his Soviet contact let slip the artifacts have power, Artie soon discovered they have frightening and dangerous powers. Unable to live with the guilt of what he had done, he turned himself in. This was the day Mrs. Frederic came into his life, offering him a chance to make amends for past mistakes. She had the charges expunged, and he was given a new identity, Arthur Nielsen. The change of name is not to hide from the U.S. government but from the Soviets, who consider him a spy who betrayed them. As Artie Nielsen, he joined the U.S. Secret Service and became a Warehouse agent.

In the season 1 episode "Claudia", we learn that 12 years earlier, Artie posed as a professor to get close to graduate student Joshua Donovan, to help him. At the same time, he attempted teleportation research using Rheticus' Compass – an artifact that it had been Artie's mission to retrieve. Unfortunately, he watched helplessly with Joshua's younger sister, Claudia Donovan, as Joshua disappeared, apparently killed in an experiment with the compass. This incident caused Artie much grief because he had pushed Joshua to continue the investigation and promised Claudia that he would do whatever he could to help keep him safe. Only later is it discovered that Joshua had trapped himself in an inter-dimensional space. Persuaded by Claudia and armed with new information about the compass, Artie reproduced the experiment and rescued Joshua.

Artie was once partnered with a fellow Warehouse agent James MacPherson, but they had a falling out, and MacPherson disappeared for about 15 years. Starting with the season 1 episode "Implosion", MacPherson returns as Artie’s nemesis – collecting and auctioning off artifacts to release them back into the world. In the season one finale, "MacPherson", MacPherson blows up the umbilicus with Artie still inside, presumably killing him. In the season 2 premiere, "Time Will Tell", we learn that Artie is saved by the Phoenix artifact and rises from the ashes. Soon after that, MacPherson is captured and killed.

In season 2's "Vendetta", Artie is the only one opposed to the reinstatement of H. G. Wells. He is vindicated in the season two finale, "Reset" when H.G. is revealed to be a villain.

As revealed in the season 3 finale, "Stand", when preparing for Sykes' attack on the Warehouse, Artie takes a watch that MacPherson gave to him, hoping that he would never have to use it. After the Warehouse is destroyed, Pete exclaims, "We lost, Artie. We lost." Artie reveals the watch and says, "Not yet."

In the season 4 premiere, "A New Hope", Artie discovers that Pandora's box was destroyed with the Warehouse and, as a result, the world has lost hope. Realizing that the watch can lead them to a fail-safe that can reset 24 hours, Artie, Claudia, Pete, and Myka set out to find the artifact. The fail-safe is revealed to be the astrolabe of Ferdinand Magellan. When Artie and Pete find the last piece of the Astrolabe, they are attacked by a Templar group with the astrolabe. Pete is killed and, while Artie prepares to use the astrolabe, the dying leader of the Templars says that by using the astrolabe, Artie will bring "a great evil of your own design upon you." Artie then uses the astrolabe, goes back in time, and prevents the Warehouse from being destroyed. As a result of his actions, H.G. Wells, Mrs. Frederic, and Pete are still alive. Artie later has a nightmare about Claudia attacking him with a dagger and, after waking up, he learns from Leena that Claudia left.

Artie is approached by Brother Adrian of the Templars, asking his assistance in finding the person who used the astrolabe, insisting that it must be used again to restore the timeline and prevent evil creation. When Adrian discovers that Artie was the astrolabe user, he threatens to destroy his life's work by stealing and unleashing artifacts from the Warehouse until Artie undoes what he has done. As Artie's behavior becomes more and more erratic, he is approached by Mrs. Frederic, Leena, and H. G. Wells and, in the episode "Second Chance", he reveals to them the story of the astrolabe and Brother Adrian. Because of his vision of Claudia and the dagger, Artie suggests the evil may be Claudia, but Mrs. Frederic points out that Adrian's actions make him the likely suspect. In the episode "The Ones You Love", Leena witnesses Artie during a supposed confrontation with Adrian and observes that he is alone and only imagining Adrian's presence. In reality, it is Artie who has been stealing and unleashing artifacts. When Leena confronts him with what she has witnessed, Artie is tormented as he tries to understand what is happening to him. Although warned by Mrs. Frederic to flee the Warehouse, Leena approaches Artie to help him. Artie, now taken over by an evil personality, turns on Leena and kills her.

In the episode "We All Fall Down", it is revealed that Artie's evil plan is to release a deadly disease, the English Sweating sickness, into the world. To do so, he must use the dagger from his vision to break open the container encasing the Chinese orchid from Warehouse 8. Although Pete, Myka, Claudia, and Steve try to retrieve the artifacts before he can get to them, Artie is successful. He unleashes the disease as the episode reaches its closing climax. Somehow knowing that the dagger will separate the true Artie from the evil residing inside him, Claudia picks it up and stabs him with it, thereby fulfilling Artie's vision.

The second half of Season 4, episode "The Living and the Dead", begins with Artie being air-lifted back to Warehouse 13. He has suffered no physical injury from the dagger, but he has retreated into his mind, not wanting to come out of his coma and face the memory and act of killing Leena. However, it is confirmed that the dagger has destroyed his dark persona. Jane Lattimer uses Sigmund Freud's desk clock to link Claudia and Steve with Artie's subconscious. Inside, they see that his mind is shutting down. Artie uses representations of Vanessa Calder and James MacPherson to get the pair out of his mind. Claudia eventually rescues Artie and brings him back from his coma while Pete and Myka manage to stop the evil Artie's plot with the orchid.

In "Parks and Rehabilitation", the Regents absolve Artie of any wrongdoing in Leena's death as the astrolabe was controlling him. Nonetheless, Artie is stricken by great grief and guilt over Leena's loss of life by his hand. He begins to take over Leena's chores and responsibilities back at the warehouse, initially refusing overtures from Myka and Steve to help. Eventually, they convince Artie that by pulling together and helping each other, they can accomplish the chores and get past the loss of Leena.

In "The Big Snag", Steve becomes concerned that Artie is acting recklessly and putting himself in danger, which he reports to Adwin Kosan. The Regents take action by assigning Dr. Abigail Cho to Warehouse 13, who is introduced to Artie by Mrs. Frederic in "The Sky's the Limit" as the new owner of Leena's B&B. Abigail is a psychotherapist whose fundamental mission is to help Artie deal with his grief over killing Leena. When Artie discovers this, he dismisses her with hostility; however, she keeps after him, explaining that it will consume him if he continues to deal with his grief alone. Artie eventually realizes he doesn't know how to deal with his loss and turns to Abigail for help.

== Personality ==
Artie is a secretive person. Because of all the people he has lost in his life, including agents, he shuts everyone out as a defense mechanism. He withholds information about himself and tends to give just enough information to agents for the mission at hand, without answering many of their questions. He obsesses about minutiae to the point of neurosis and has been known in the past to leap to conclusions based on precious little evidence beyond "gut" instinct. Artie frequently tries to protect the people with whom he's forged relationships, either by making them promises to do so (whether or not he can keep them) or by swearing to potential attackers that he won't allow harm to come to those about whom he cares. While not noticeably a religious man, he has studied the Talmud enough to at least be able to quote it.

Artie prefers old-fashioned items and ways of doing things because they are familiar and comfortable, not necessarily because he likes them better. In one instance, he finds an important document in his office card catalogue, exclaiming "Google, shmoogle, I’ll stick with paper." In the season 2 episode "13.1", he reluctantly allows a "Global Dynamics geek" to come to Warehouse 13 and upgrade the antiquated computer systems. Claudia describes to Douglas Fargo that Artie would have "vetoed fire if he'd been born a few years earlier." Nonetheless, Artie is generally adept at using modern technology when he must.

== Skills and abilities ==
Artie is a former code breaker for the NSA and is adept at noticing patterns and calculating probability. He has a high level of knowledge on various subjects, which makes him effective at his job. However, he seems to have trouble remembering dates (MacPherson and Mrs. Frederic correct him on a couple of occasions). His thirty-plus years as a Warehouse Agent have taught him the unpredictable nature of artifacts, causing him to proceed with caution in any situation.

With access to the Warehouse computer system, Artie has access to information from around the globe and shows expert computer hacking skills, obviously not better than Claudia's. However, he prefers not to use computers. He is also able to improvise gadgets out of household items; he made an electromagnet out of iron in "Merge With Caution" and used a broken windshield and his Tesla to overload Pete's ocular input in "Around the Bend". Artie is not opposed to using artifacts in his duties as a Warehouse Agent. Usually, he carries around a black kit bag, similar to what is commonly called a doctor's bag, with a random assortment of artifacts to be used in various situations.

While not confirmed, Artie is also a great deal stronger than he appears; several times in the series, he is shown knocking out an attacker in one punch.

== Relationships ==
Izzy Weisfelt (Judd Hirsch). Although Artie has a good relationship with his father, Izzy, during childhood, they become estranged as adults. As revealed in the season 2 episode "Secret Santa", Artie's parents sacrifice, working multiple jobs, to get him into Juilliard. When Artie walks away from music to join the NSA, Izzy feels betrayed. He disowns his son, and after Artie changes his identity, they have no contact for 30 years. When Claudia unexpectedly meets Izzy, she talks him into coming to South Dakota by telling him Artie is dying. When he and Artie meet, they make amends and renew their relationship.

Aleksandr. As revealed in the season 2 episode "Vendetta", Aleksandr was Artie's Soviet contact during the time that he was trading artifacts in exchange for the release of family members from the Gulag. After Artie turns himself into the U.S. authorities, Aleksandr becomes a liability to the Soviet government and is imprisoned. Although their relationship was merely one of necessity, Artie is remorseful over Aleksandr's fate, stating that he didn't know he'd be punished. Thirteen years after Aleksandr dies in prison, his son, Ivan, unsuccessfully seeks retribution against Artie.

Mrs. Frederic (C. C. H. Pounder). We learn in the season 1 episode "Implosion" that Mrs. Frederic is responsible for Artie's recruitment to the Warehouse, starting a relationship that has endured at least 30 years. Despite having such a long association, Artie doesn't learn her first name until he overhears a Regent calling her "Irene" in the 10th episode of season one, "Breakdown". As the Regents consider Artie's fitness to continue his job as agent in charge of Warehouse 13, Mrs. Frederic backs him and convinces them that he is the best agent the Warehouse has ever had. Despite the impersonal outward appearance of their relationship, Mrs. Frederic cares a great deal about Artie, and Artie reciprocates by giving Mrs. Frederic his respect and loyalty.

Hugo Miller (René Auberjonois). Introduced in the season 2 episode "13.1", Hugo was a Warehouse agent at the time of Artie's arrival. They were friendly and often played board games together, though his persistent cheating and practical jokes annoyed Artie. After being institutionalized for years with half his brain downloaded into a computer, his mind is made whole again when Artie reverses the process using the same artifact that causes the initial separation. As a result, Hugo now feels some indebtedness to Artie. It is revealed in the episode "Love Sick", much to Artie's dismay, that Hugo had a long-ago relationship with Vanessa Calder.

James MacPherson (Roger Rees). As revealed by their appearance in Jane Lattimer's memories in the season 3 episode "Shadows", the partnership of Artie and James dates back to about 30 years ago, at or near the time Artie first arrived at Warehouse 13. Their partnership lasted about 15 years, during which they were close friends. As seen in the season 1 episode "MacPherson", disagreements develop between them, and James eventually turns to criminal behavior. When James reappears in the episode "Implosion", Artie begins a relentless pursuit of him. In the season 2 premiere "Time Will Tell", as James lies dying in Artie's arms, he expresses remorse for what he has done. Despite the differences that drove them apart, Artie feels grief and loss over the death of this man who was once his good friend.

Carol Augustine (Lynne Cormack). During Artie's partnership with James MacPherson, both men vie for the affection of Carol. Carol eventually chooses James, and they are married. James' use of the Phoenix artifact to save Carol from a fire drives the final wedge between him and Artie. When James is imprisoned, Carol blames Artie, claiming he's responsible. When she and Artie meet in the season 1 episodes "Implosion" and "MacPherson", Artie displays no ill will toward her, though Carol is still bitter. Artie insists she chose poorly by choosing James over him.

Joshua Donovan (Tyler Hynes). In the season 1 episode "Claudia", we see that Joshua and the work he is doing with Rheticus’ compass impresses Artie. Bolstered by Artie's encouragement, Joshua pushes on with his experiment, which results in his apparent death. Although a tragedy, Artie claims to feel no guilt over the incident. After Joshua is rescued from the interdimensional space, Artie admits responsibility and regret over Joshua's lost 12 years. In "Elements", Artie vouches for Joshua and helps to land him a position at CERN.

Leena (Genelle Williams). Despite Leena's youthful appearance, it is implied that she and Artie have had a relationship that long pre-dates the series's start. In one of the few glimpses we have into her past, Leena states she was not yet around when everything went down between Artie and MacPherson. Artie and Leena spend frequent time together in the Warehouse, usually working but sometimes just enjoying one another's company. Artie values Leena's opinions and frequently relies on her aura-reading ability, often deferring to her. Leena also maternally looks after Artie, such as making sure he eats right. In the Season 4 episode "The Ones You Love", Artie. Through the use of Magellan's astrolabe, the latter is taken over by an evil personality, killing Leena by gunshot as she tries to help him. After being freed from the astrolabe's control, Artie feels great grief and guilt over Leena's death, knowing that it was his hand that killed her. In the episode "The Sky's the Limit", he seeks the consul of psychologist Abigail Cho, telling her, "I killed someone I love, and I don't know what to do."

Pete Lattimer (Eddie McClintock). Artie is often annoyed by Pete's playful nature, such as when he catches him playing with Timothy Leary's eyeglasses, but finds him to be a reliable and capable agent. Unlike the clashes he has with Myka, Artie's relationship with Pete has been largely free of conflict. Through their association, they develop a respect and fondness for each other. In the episode "For the Team", fearing that Pete is becoming too occupied with his job at the Warehouse, Artie tells him, "You don't have to miss out on having a real life like I did," Pete replies, "I'd be honored to have a life like yours." In the season 4 premiere "A New Hope", while retrieving an artifact that can reverse time, Pete is mortally wounded. As his life slips away, Pete asks if he'll remember dying after Artie travels back in time and sets everything right, to which Artie answers, "You won't remember." Seconds later, Pete passes, and Artie adds, "But I will," with a hollow expression on his face revealing how much he truly cares for Pete. While defending Pete and Myka to the Regents, Artie says, "Agents Lattimer and Bering, I mean, they've repeatedly shown bravery, they've shown quick-thinking, they're an excellent team, and they're probably the best agents that the Warehouse has ever had."

Myka Bering (Joanne Kelly). During much of the first season, Artie and Myka have a strained relationship. She resents Artie's compulsive secrecy and believes she and Pete are being treated as if they're expendable, to which Artie reacts. "Did she not notice the word secret in her job description? Their job is to follow instructions." In the episode "Duped", Myka explains to Artie that she needs to know all that she can to have a fighting chance in the field, that she thinks Artie is great, and that she wants him to think the same of her. Admitting he erred, the relationship improves. They clash again in season 2 episodes "Vendetta" and "Where and When" after Myka advocates for the reinstatement of H. G. Wells, a decision Artie adamantly opposes. The incident causes friction between them, but the relationship soon returns to normal. Despite their disagreements, Artie and Myka develop a deep affection for each other, which is frequently on display: In "Time Will Tell", Myka reacts with joy upon seeing Artie rise from the ashes of the exploded umbilicus and, in "Age Before Beauty", Artie is deeply troubled when Myka falls victim to a rapid aging artifact. We also witness Artie's emotion in "The New Guy" upon seeing that Myka has returned to the Warehouse, simply uttering "Good" with a satisfying smile on his face.

Daniel Dickinson (Simon Reynolds). Artie experiences some difficulty with Dickinson in the series' early episodes. Dickinson first tries to get his agents transferred back to Washington, and then Pete and Myka contact Dickinson for help on a Warehouse case, forcing Artie to forbid further contact. In the episode "Resonance", Artie accuses Dickinson of hacking into the Warehouse computers, though it is later discovered the breach was initiated elsewhere. Despite their difficulties, it is never personal. When Dickinson is murdered in the season 2 episode "Vendetta", Artie feels remorse when he discovers that the murder weapon was an artifact he had traded to the Soviets.

Claudia Donovan (Allison Scagliotti). As revealed in the season 1 episode "Claudia", Artie and Claudia first meet 12 years earlier during the incident with Rheticus' compass. Blaming Artie for what happened to her brother, Joshua, she seeks him out and, after some forceful persuasion, he rescues Joshua, for which Claudia is grateful. With Claudia now having nowhere to go, and Artie feeling responsible for her, he offers her a job at the Warehouse, which she accepts. Although they start out having occasional squabbles, over time, they develop a deep father-daughter-like affection. This relationship means a great deal to Claudia since she lost her parents when she was young. Although Claudia often makes jokes at Artie's expense, usually about his age, she is also the more outwardly affectionate. Unaccustomed to hugs and gift-giving, Artie often appears uncomfortable with Claudia's gestures. In the season 2 episode "Age Before Beauty", we see Artie's uneasiness with the role of a father figure when his attempt to advise the teenage Claudia on a matter of romance ends in an awkward exchange. In "Reset", as Artie recovers from a gunshot wound, Claudia breaks into tears at the thought of something grave befalling him, to which he assures her, "Kiddo, hey, I plan on making your life hell for a very long time." In season 3 episode "Trials", Artie secretly follows Claudia on her first lead assignment because, like a proud parent, he wants to be there to see her succeed.

The Regents. During Artie's first 30 years at the Warehouse, contact with the Regents was a rare occurrence. His first meeting with the Regents en masse occurs in the season 1 episode "Breakdown", in which Artie's service to the Warehouse is under review. Being in a subordinate position, Artie's relationship with the Regents is typically businesslike. As revealed by his monologue at the beginning of "The 40th Floor", Artie admires the Regents and considers their protection a priority.

Helena G. Wells (Jaime Murray). When Artie learns of the debronzing of H. G. Wells, he first considers her a dangerous threat that must be neutralized. He is angered when learning that Myka has had contact with Helena without telling him. In the season 2 episode "Vendetta", after Helena convinces the Regents that she is no longer a threat and is reinstated as a Warehouse agent, Artie refuses to welcome her to the team, being convinced that she is still dangerous. His feelings about Helena begin to soften somewhat in the episode "Where and When" after she struggles to repair her time machine to save the lives of Pete and Myka. Artie's distrust of Helena is vindicated when she's revealed to be a villain, as she attempts to initiate a worldwide disaster in the season 2 finale, "Reset". Although Helena's remorse over her actions wins over Myka's trust, Artie is not so easily swayed. It is not until Helena's heroic actions and selfless sacrifice in the season 3 finale, "Stand", that Artie is finally convinced of her sincerity. After he reverses time in the season 4 premiere "A New Hope", only Artie has a memory of Helena's heroic sacrifice. To the surprise of Mrs. Frederic and Regent Kosan, Artie vehemently advocates for Helena's freedom.

Vanessa Calder (Lindsay Wagner). In the season 2 episode "For the Team", Artie is discovered to be re-growing his appendix to invite a visit from the official Warehouse physician, Dr. Vanessa Calder. Urged on by Pete, Artie gathers the nerve to ask Vanessa to join him on a walk in town, which she accepts. Artie sees Vanessa again when they collaborate on a case in the season 3 episode "Love Sick". They agree to a dinner date, but when Hugo Miller arrives, Artie learns that he and Vanessa were once a couple and fears they will get back together. Heartbroken, Artie confides to Claudia, "Given my line of work and my advanced years, I have pretty much made peace with the fact that I would not find romantic companionship. Love. And then, Vanessa. And so I started to hope. False hope, it would seem." At the end of the episode, Vanessa tells Artie that he sees and appreciates her for the woman she now is, while Hugo sees the young woman she once was. Although Vanessa must return home to Atlanta, she kisses Artie and tells him that he owes her a dinner. In the season 4 episode "Fractures", it is revealed that Artie and Vanessa have been pursuing a long-distance relationship. Artie feels that the time is right to take things 'to the next level'; however, their date is interrupted by Alice's escape from Lewis Carroll's mirror. When Vanessa is nearly killed by Alice's act of revenge against Artie, he ends his relationship with Vanessa thinking it will protect her. Vanessa tells Artie that she will wait for him until he figures out that cutting himself off from those who love him is a bad idea.

Steve Jinks (Aaron Ashmore). Being the new guy at Warehouse 13, Artie's relationship with Steve is not as evolved as those he's developed with Pete, Myka, and Claudia. It is portrayed, however, that Steve fits in well with the Warehouse family. In the episode "Stand", we see Artie grieving over the loss of Steve and feeling partly responsible. He is upset with Mrs. Frederic for not telling him that Steve was working undercover.

Jane Lattimer (Kate Mulgrew). Although Artie and Jane crossed paths 30 years ago, as revealed in Jane's memories in the episode "Shadows", it is unclear whether or not he knew her identity at that time. Their first contact in the present timeline occurs in the season 3 episode "The 40th Floor", where Artie appears not to recognize her. Their previous contact was likely just in passing, but the association is thus far undeveloped if there is more to it. Since Artie is responsible for Jane's son, Pete, he shares a relationship with her that is more personal than the one he shares with the other Regents.

Abigail Cho (Kelly Hu). In the season 4 episode "The Sky's the Limit", Abigail is introduced to Artie by Mrs. Frederic as the new owner of Leena's B&B. Artie soon discovers that Abigail is a psychotherapist and that her true purpose is to help him deal with his grief over killing Leena. Artie's initial response is hostility, as he wants nothing to do with Abigail's psychoanalysis; however, she persists in pressuring Artie to allow her to help him. Artie eventually realizes that he doesn't know how to deal with his loss and turns to Abigail for help.
