= Warehouse 13 season 3 =

Warehouse 13
- Season 3
- DVD cover art
- No. of episodes: 13

Release
- Original network: Syfy
- Original release: July 11 – December 6, 2011

Season chronology
- ← Previous; Season 2 Next → Season 4

The third season of the American television series Warehouse 13 premiered on July 11, 2011, on Syfy. The season consists of 13 episodes; the first twelve episodes of the season aired on Mondays at 9 pm, though the Christmas special aired on a Tuesday. The show stars Eddie McClintock, Joanne Kelly, Saul Rubinek, Allison Scagliotti and Genelle Williams.

== Cast ==
=== Main ===
- Eddie McClintock as Pete Lattimer
- Joanne Kelly as Myka Bering
- Saul Rubinek as Artie Nielsen
- Allison Scagliotti as Claudia Donovan
- Genelle Williams as Leena

=== Special guest ===
- Anthony Michael Hall as Walter Sykes

=== Recurring ===
- C. C. H. Pounder as Mrs. Irene Frederic
- Roger Rees as James MacPherson
- Jaime Murray as Helena G. Wells
- Aaron Ashmore as Steve Jinks
- Kate Mulgrew as Jane Lattimer
- Sasha Roiz as Marcus Diamond
- Ashley Williams as Sally Stukowski
- Faran Tahir as Adwin Kosan

=== Guest ===
- Jeri Ryan as Amanda Lattimer
- René Auberjonois as Hugo Miller
- Alessandra Torresani as Meagan
- Lindsay Wagner as Dr. Vanessa Calder
- Neil Grayston as Douglas Fargo
- Gareth David-Lloyd as William Wollcott
- Steven Yeun as Gibson Rice
- Gabriel Hogan as Sam Martino
- Erick Avari as Caturanga
- Susan Hogan as Jeannie Bering

== Production ==
On October 5, 2010, the Syfy network announced that Warehouse 13 had been picked up for a third season of 13 new episodes, set to premiere on July 11, 2011. Aaron Ashmore joined the cast this season as ATF agent Steve Jinks. On March 22, 2011, Syfy announced that they would air another Christmas special of Warehouse 13 during season three.

A ten part webisode series, entitled "Of Monsters and Men", premiered on Syfy.com on July 5, 2011.

== Episodes ==
No. overall	No. in season	Title	Directed by	Written by	Original release date	US viewers (millions)
27	1	"The New Guy"	Stephen Surjik	Jack Kenny	July 11, 2011	2.34
Former ATF agent Steven Jinks (Aaron Ashmore) joins the Warehouse team and goes undercover with Pete to search for suspects in a case where people are being killed in the same way as the main characters in Shakespeare's tragedies. Meanwhile, Artie, Claudia, and Leena try to stop a lightning storm in the Warehouse. Artifacts: Jimi Hendrix's guitar, William Shakespeare's folio, the statues of Zeus and Hera, the "Janus" Device
28	2	"Trials"	Constantine Makris	Drew Z. Greenberg	July 18, 2011	2.46
Myka and Pete are sent on a mission to uncover how an airplane pilot, E.R surgeon, and news reporter have all lost their memories. Claudia is in charge of her mission with the new guy, Steve, to locate Typhoid Mary's knife, an artifact that can transfer illnesses and injuries from one person to another. Myka begins to come to terms with her fears following her mistakes with HG Wells. The song at the end is So Easily by Kathryn Calder Artifacts: Walter Winchell's tie clip and cuff links, Typhoid Mary's knife.
29	3	"Love Sick"	Tawnia McKiernan	Andrew Kreisberg	July 25, 2011	2.04
Artie, Claudia, Dr. Vanessa Calder, and Hugo Miller try to deal with an artifact that turns people into clay via a computer virus. Meanwhile, Pete and Myka wake up naked in bed together with no memory of what happened and attempt to retrace their steps and find Steve. Artifacts: Judah Loew's amulet, W. C. Fields' juggling balls, Marilyn Monroe's hairbrush. Walt Disney's Paintbrush, Richard Nixon's shoes, François Villon's Ink Well.
30	4	"Queen for a Day"	Jeremiah Chechik	Holly Harold	August 1, 2011	2.25
Claudia and Steve go to Shiloh National Military Park (Shiloh, Tennessee) and attempt to infiltrate a Civil War reenactment to recover Ulysses S. Grant's flask. Pete and Myka deal with Pete's ex-wife, Amanda (Jeri Ryan), who is getting remarried - she inadvertently activates an artifact that can make anyone she touches her devoted slave. Artifacts: Hatshepsut's golden beehive, Ulysses S. Grant's flask.
31	5	"3... 2... 1..."	Chris Fisher	Bob Goodman	August 8, 2011	2.54
Pete and Myka, with the help of a hologram version of H.G. Wells, try to recover Joshua's trumpet, which has eluded the warehouse agents since the 19th century. Artifact: Joshua's trumpet; The "Janus" device
32	6	"Don't Hate the Player"	Chris Fisher	Ian Stokes	August 15, 2011	2.42
Fargo becomes trapped in a video game inspired by Warehouse 13 and requires help from Pete, Claudia, and Myka. Meanwhile, Stukowski recruits Artie and Steve to help with a case and catches them stealing an artifact. Artifacts: Beatrix Potter's tea set, Vincent van Gogh's The Stormy Night (based on The Starry Night), Pink Floyd's 'The Dark Side Of The Moon' pyramid device.
33	7	"Past Imperfect"	Tawnia McKiernan	Nell Scovell	August 22, 2011	2.25
Myka hunts for Leo, the man who murdered her old partner, and the Warehouse agents think there's a link between the killer and the Secret Service. Meanwhile, Artie and Steve discover that Agent Stukowski is up to something when she steals an artifact. Artifacts: USS Eldridge's barometer, Triangle Shirtwaist Factory's doorknob, the Trans-continental railway spike, Mr. Mental and Coco's fezzes, Ivan Pavlov's bell.
34	8	"The 40th Floor"	Chris Fisher	Benjamin Raab & Deric A. Hughes	August 29, 2011	2.29
Mrs. Frederic and Steve interrogate Stukowski after the agents learn that she was using artifacts to kill Regents, the Warehouse's secret protectors. Pete and Claudia seek out Stukowski's partner-in-crime amid a crisis involving Myka, Artie, and three Regents, one of which turns out to be Pete's mother, Jane (played by Kate Mulgrew). Artifacts: Berlin Wall spray paint, Shirō Ishii's medal, Lloyd Wright's Pick Up Sticks, The Remati Schackle
35	9	"Shadows"	Tawnia McKiernan	Bob Goodman & Holly Harold	September 12, 2011	1.91
Pete enters Jane's memories using the "Walking Shoes" to investigate the Regents' murders. Meanwhile, Myka and Claudia go to Portland, Oregon, to look into a string of mysterious disappearances that start with a local T-shirt shop owner. Artifacts: Paul Tibbets's binoculars, Carlo Collodi's bracelet, the "Walking Shoes"
36	10	"Insatiable"	Constantine Makris	Benjamin Raab & Deric A. Hughes	September 19, 2011	1.83
A 19th-century mason jar in a taco truck may be linked to a zombie-like outbreak in Ithaca, NY. A fortune-telling machine named Sallah has Claudia believing she is about to die. One of Syke's henchmen, Marcus Diamond, has a proposition for Steve. Artifact: The Donner Party's glass jar, Albert Butz's glasses, the "Water Canister"
37	11	"Emily Lake" (Part 1)	Millicent Shelton	Nell Scovell & Ian Stokes	October 3, 2011	1.63
Pete, Myka and Claudia investigate the theft of a top-secret file from the warehouse which brings them to a high school in Wyoming where H.G Wells is working as a teacher named Emily Lake. Walter Sykes, after "re-constructing" H.G. from the "Janus" Device, kills Steve Jinks, who was working undercover. Part 1 of the season 3 finale. Artifacts: Janus coin, Cecil B. DeMille's riding crop.
38	12	"Stand" (Part 2)	Stephen Surjik	Andrew Kreisberg & Drew Z. Greenberg	October 3, 2011	1.63
Pete and Myka race halfway across the world to China to find a forgotten Warehouse secret as Sykes' plan nears its terrible fruition. Conclusion of the season 3 finale. Artifacts: Cecil B. DeMille's riding crop, Black Bart's cannon, rigging rope from the Mary Celeste, Johann Maelzel's metronome, House of Commons masonry survived from the Blitz.
39	13	"The Greatest Gift"	Jack Kenny	Story by : Mike Johnson & John-Paul Nickel; Teleplay by : John-Paul Nickel	December 6, 2011	1.58
Christmas special. When Pete inadvertently activates an artifact in the Warehouse's "Aisle of Noel", he is transported to a version of reality in which he doesn't exist. While there, he must figure out a way to convince his former Warehouse teammates to help him defeat an old enemy of theirs and get him back to his reality. Artifacts: Philip Van Doren Stern's upholstery brush, Rudolph's nose.

== DVD release ==
Warehouse 13: Season Three
Set details: 12 episodes; Region 1 – 3-disc DVD set; Region 2 - 4-disc DVD set; Features: Anamorphic Widescreen (1.78:1); Dolby Digital 5.1 English audio; Subtitles English		Bonus features: Three audio commentaries; "The New Guy" commentary; "3...2...1..." commentary; "The 40th Floor" commentary; Featurettes; "Of Mouse and Men" 10-part animated web series including never-before-seen chapter; Guest starring...; "Love Sick" podcast with Saul Rubinek; "Secret Santa" holiday episode; "The Greatest Gift" holiday episode (Region 2); Deleted scenes; Gag reel	
Release dates:	Region 1	Region 2	Region 4
Release dates:	July 10, 2012	September 17, 2012	TBA
