= Claudia Donovan =

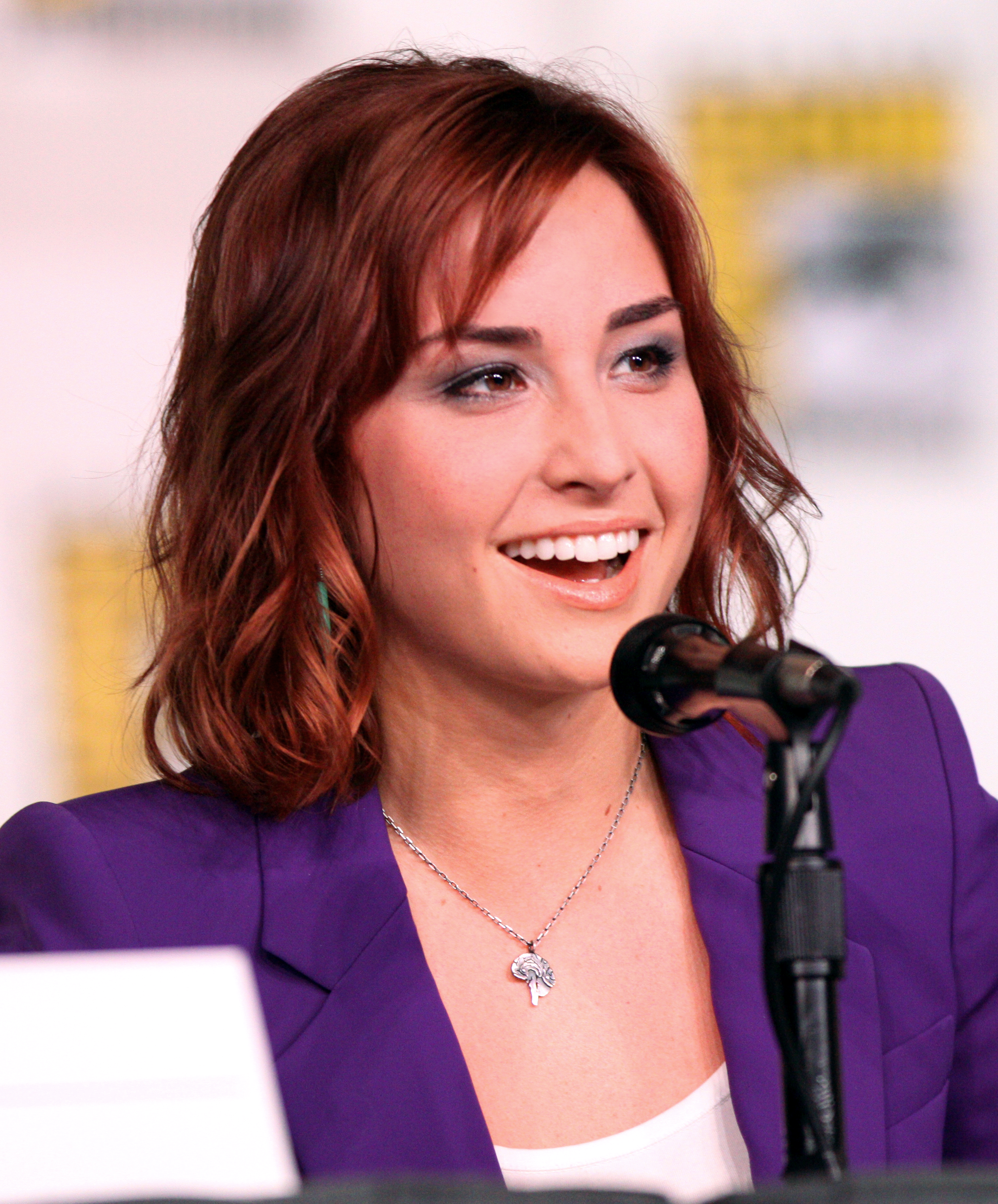
- Claudia Donovan's portrayer, Allison Scagliotti.
- First appearance: "Claudia"
- Last appearance: "Endless"
- Created by: Jane Espenson
- Portrayed by: Allison Scagliotti

In-universe information
- Nickname: Claude
- Occupation: Hacker; Inventor; Warehouse 13 agent Future Caretaker of Warehouse 13
- Family: Joshua Donovan (brother); Claire Donovan (sister)
- Significant others: Todd, Douglas Fargo (mutual crush)

Claudia Donovan, played by Allison Scagliotti, is a fictional character from the US television series Warehouse 13 (2009–2014). She has been portrayed as a talented computer hacker and inventor. Her first appearance in season 1 was as an employee of warehouse 13. As Claudia gains experience, her warehouse duties and responsibilities expand to the point where, in the series finale, she becomes the new caretaker of Warehouse 13. Her partner is Steve Jinks.

== Character history ==
Claudia is very intelligent, resourceful, and technologically savvy, but has no college education. By the end of season one, she is known to be 19 years old, though she has her 21st birthday party in season four.

Claudia's parents died when she was very young, and for some years her brother Joshua raised her. When Joshua disappeared, presumed dead, Claudia had to fend for herself with no money until Joshua was found.

As revealed in the season 1 episode "Claudia", about twelve years prior to that episode's main timeline, Joshua had met Artie Nielsen while attending college. Posing as a professor, Artie attempted to dissuade Joshua from pursuing a dangerous experiment in teleportation. The experiment went badly wrong, with Joshua disappearing in a brilliant flash of light. Believing him dead, Claudia lost the only family she had left. About ten years later, and six months prior to the events of "Claudia", Claudia began to have visions of Joshua. Believing herself to be going insane from grief, she checked herself into a psychiatric care clinic. Eventually she came to realize that Joshua was, in fact, alive and trying to contact her from the immaterial prison of the inter-dimensional limbo that resulted from his experiment. After about four months in the psychiatric ward, Claudia checked herself out and began efforts to rescue her brother.

Blaming Artie for what happened to Joshua, Claudia first hacked the American power grid in order to identify pockets of large, unexplained, energy usage. Doing so, she located Warehouse 13 in the badlands of South Dakota, and hacked into its computer mainframe. Shortly after, in the main timeline of "Claudia", she arrives at the Warehouse and abducts Artie, taking him to the site of her brother's failed experiment. Once there, she forces Artie to help her recreate the conditions that led to Joshua's disappearance. When Artie realizes that Claudia is not insane, he willingly helps in her rescue attempt. They successfully enter the inter-dimensional space where Joshua is trapped, completing the instruction engraved on Rheticus' compass in order to bring them all back to the corporeal realm.

Upon Artie's return to the Warehouse, Mrs. Frederic tells him that Claudia could pose a threat to the Warehouse and that he must deal with her, telling him "You know the options." Given Claudia's technological aptitude and ingenuity, and some convincing from Leena, Artie opts to offer her a job at the Warehouse, which she readily accepts. Most of her initial work involves record-keeping, filing, and taking inventory, which she finds to be a mind-numbingly tedious waste of her skills. Bored with her assigned tasks, she takes up personal side projects, including repurposing a spectroscope into a 3D hologram imager.

As Claudia gains experience, Artie begins to expand her Warehouse duties and responsibilities. Originally classified a probationary associate, Claudia's first mission as an apprentice comes in season 2's "For the Team", when she accompanies Myka Bering to find the artifact responsible for mysterious deaths on a college wrestling team. Her first mission as senior agent comes in season 3's "Trials", when she and new agent Steve Jinks are sent to snag Typhoid Mary's knife.

During the events of Warehouse 2's reactivation in the season 2 episode "Buried", Mrs. Frederic explains to Claudia that everyone at the Warehouse has a purpose, and that she has to be prepared. It is later revealed to Claudia that her purpose is to be a backup "caretaker" for Warehouse 13 in the event that Mrs. Frederic is killed. Claudia hesitantly begins to undertake the procedure to become the warehouse caretaker before Agents Bering and Pete Lattimer manage to deactivate Warehouse 2. Frightened, Claudia reveals to Artie that she's not ready to be caretaker and makes him promise to never put her in that position, to have something done to her against her will, again.

It is revealed in season 3's "Don't Hate the Player" that Claudia's experience in the psychiatric hospital has left her with the fear that her life is not real, but a creation of her imagination and she is still locked in the institution being given electroshock therapy.

In the Season 4 episode "No Pain, No Gain", Mrs. Frederic tutors Claudia about the warehouse and its artifacts — how they are created and that not all of them may be dangerous. Claudia eventually overcomes her trepidation and realizes that she wants badly to become caretaker of Warehouse 13, which she reveals to Abigail Chow in the episode "Instinct".

During the Season 4 episode "Runaway", Artie plans a surprise party for Claudia's twenty-first birthday, but Claudia wishes to have her party at the local bar. Cherie Currie makes a guest appearance, and invites Claudia up to the stage to do a duet of "Cherry Bomb".

In the series finale of Season 5 episode "Endless", the show flash-forwards "several decades" into the future, and it is revealed that Claudia has become the caretaker of the Warehouse, and that Warehouse 13 is still in operation in South Dakota. She appears to three future agents to counsel them on retrieving a newly detected artifact (possibly Obama's basketball). Claudia notices glaring similarities between the "future agents", and Artie, Myka, and Pete. As the show ends, Claudia is seen at King Arthur's roundtable viewing memories of her former fellow agents, and friends. A series of voiceovers is then heard of all the series' agents each repeating the words "Endless wonders", making reference to a phrase that Artie stated more than once during the shows' run.

== Skills and abilities ==
Claudia becomes the Warehouse's resident "tech girl", lending her computer hacking skills and technological expertise to Warehouse 13. Some of the gadgets Pete and Myka use in the field are "Claudia Donovan Originals": she creates handcuffs capable of delivering a 20,000 volt charge ("Claudia"); gloves which discharge energy absorbed by an artifact suit ("Mild Mannered"); and a communicator to interact with people in a virtual reality console ("Don't Hate the Player"). She is also quick to understand and adapt Warehouse-grade technology to her devices, for example reconfiguring the Tesla guns so that they no longer need to recharge, as well as creating a Tesla Grenade ("Love Sick"; "The New Guy").

Claudia begins accompanying Warehouse Agents on missions from Season 2's "Mild Mannered", although her first official mission, as Warehouse Apprentice, is in "For the Team". At first she attempts to be more mature and business-like in her approach to being an agent, but soon realizes that she is more effective just being herself. During the time that Myka leaves the Warehouse, Claudia apparently steps up to full-time agent status alongside Pete and Artie. With the addition of Steve Jinks to the Warehouse, Claudia is partnered with him and has seniority over him (a fact she tries not to let Jinks forget).

In the Season 4 episode "No Pain, No Gain", Claudia discovers that she is able to sense the "birth of an artifact".

From "A New Hope" we learn that Claudia knows (at least) the books and chapters of both the old and new testaments of the Bible. She explains it was required reading in the psychiatric hospital: "I think that's how they kept their funding."

Claudia has on a number of occasions served as the Warehouse's Caretaker, and during those times has had a nearly direct awareness of the Warehouse's status and condition, as well as being able to activate the Warehouse's contents without physically interacting with them. Outside of these events, as a potential future Caretaker she also retains a portion of her link to the Warehouse, and is able to sense certain events relating to it.

== Relationships ==
Claudia has a close relationship with her brother, Joshua, who is at least her intellectual equal. After the death of their parents, Joshua had put much of his personal life on hold to care for his young sister. After being rescued from the inter-dimensional limbo, Joshua takes a job at CERN in Switzerland. Because he did not age during the time he was stuck between dimensions, Claudia and Joshua now appear to be about the same age. They remain in touch, though rarely see each other.

In the four years prior to Joshua's rescue, Claudia had lived on her own, keeping to herself with no apparent boyfriends or girlfriends.

After joining Warehouse 13, Claudia develops an easy friendship with Pete Lattimer: the two are often seen playfully joking around with each other.

Claudia has strong affections for her Warehouse co-workers and considers them her surrogate family. At the end of season 1, when she is framed for conspiring with James MacPherson, she is distraught at almost losing the only real family she has ever known.

Although they have some disagreements, Claudia and Artie develop a close father-daughter-like relationship. As seen in "Age Before Beauty", Artie's uneasiness with the role of father figure often leads to awkward conversations when he feels the need to give advice. Claudia's outward displays of affection, such as hugs and gift giving, often make Artie uncomfortable. In the half way episode of season 4 she stabs him to save him and in the next episode she is mentally torn by the fact that he may not survive.

In season 2, Claudia develops a romantic relationship with Todd, a recent arrival in Univille and an employee at the hardware store. In episode 9, she discovers he is in the witness protection program. After a brief romance, Todd is forced by his handler to relocate, with Claudia claiming she will find him. In season 3 episode 9, she still describes him as a "boyfriend".

In the Eureka/Warehouse 13 crossover episodes, Claudia develops an otherwise unexplored romantic relationship with Douglas Fargo.

In season 3, Claudia is introduced to her new partner Steve Jinks. They develop a great relationship and become best friends. She becomes very disturbed and angry when Mrs. Frederic fires Steve, apparently for insubordination, but later learns Jinks was fired as a cover and is still with the Warehouse. When Jinks is killed in the season 3 finale, Claudia is very upset and depressed. She states she intends to use an artifact to bring him back to life, and does so at the beginning of season 4. In consequence, however, she becomes linked with Jinks, such that she experiences the physical effects of any injuries that he receives. She is more determined to save them than he is himself.
