= List of Warehouse 13 characters =

This is a list of fictional characters in the television series Warehouse 13. The article deals with the series' main and recurring characters.

== Main characters ==
=== Daniel Dickinson ===
Daniel Dickinson (Simon Reynolds) was the Deputy Director at Secret Service Headquarters in Washington, D.C. Before Pete and Myka's reassignment to Warehouse 13, he was their boss. He is not happy about losing two of his best agents to some bizarre warehouse in South Dakota, unaware of its importance. He is initially determined to get them back, especially after facts about Artie's past come to light. Eventually, he sees his former agents are committed to their new positions, and they part ways. In the Season 2 episode "Vendetta," he is murdered for his knowledge about Artie's past.

=== Steven Jinks ===
Steven Jinks (Aaron Ashmore) is a former U.S. Bureau of Alcohol, Tobacco, Firearms and Explosives (ATF) agent who Irene Frederic recruited after having been told by Artie the nature of Warehouse 13. Jinks was intended to be Agent Bering's replacement, but after returning to the Warehouse, Agent Bering and Agent Lattimer resumed working as a team out in the field. At the same time, he does any fieldwork with Claudia Donovan if multiple artifacts need to be retrieved at one time. Agent Jinks also has the perfect ability to tell when someone is lying; even if the person lying is a master of deception, he would still be able to tell. However, certain artifacts, such as Richard Nixon's shoes, could nullify the ability. This power has other limitations: Steve seems to be unable to sense general deception, only baldfaced lies; in some ways, this makes his power more limited and easier to bypass than Pete Lattimer's vibes or Leena's aura-reading ability. Someone aware of this limitation can use it against him, as Sally Stukowski did. Steve's power seems to need some concentration to work; it is active rather than passive.

As revealed in "The New Guy," Steve is a Buddhist. The centeredness this gives him makes it possible for him to work the Feng Shui Spiral as Leena did; it is unknown whether any other current Warehouse employee can also successfully do this. In "Trials," Steve revealed to Claudia that he is gay after Claudia thought he was hitting on her. In "Love Sick," Steve told Pete and Myka that he is gay. While Pete & Myka were in a state of drunkenness brought about by contact with W.C. Fields' juggling balls, they inadvertently lured Steve into the bronzing chamber and temporarily bronzed him. After recovering from their drunkenness, they retraced their movements in the Warehouse and ultimately debronzed Steve. In "Queen For A Day," it was revealed that Steve had an older sister named Olivia Jinks. Steve's older sister Olivia, who frequently got him out of trouble when he was a kid, was killed at twenty by a stray bullet. Her death is the reason Steve joined ATF, and Claudia reminds Steve of her.

In "The 40th Floor", Pete, Myka, and Steve were sent to apprehend Sally Stukowski. After successfully captured, Stukowski was interrogated first by Artie and then by Mrs. Frederic. During the interrogation, Mrs. Frederic employed a dark artifact to extract information. Steve protested the use of torture on Stukowski and attempted to dissuade Mrs. Frederic from using the artifact. When she refused, Steve drew his service pistol, and in the ensuing confrontation, Stukowski managed to escape from custody. As a result of his insubordination, Mrs. Frederic fired Agent Jinks. In "Insatiable," Steve is shown in a bar, where he attempts to purchase a drink but is refused due to his credit card being burned out. Marcus Diamond shows up and offers to pay off Steve's bar tab. He then proceeds to try to get Jinks to join A to Z Technologies. Steve eventually acquiesces. In "Emily Lake," it was revealed that Jinks was working undercover for the Warehouse all the time, his "firing" and "defection" being part of a plan conceived by Jane Lattimer and Mrs. Frederic, but he ended up dead at the airport due to an "undetected heart defect" in the end, presumably caused by the same lethal injection that was used to kill Sally Stukowski.

In "An Evil Within," Steve was brought back to life using Johann Maelzel's Metronome, with Claudia and Jane's help. He had no recollection of being dead and was unaware of his death until he notices the metronome. Angry and confused, he heads towards the patio where he sits and talks with Claudia about how he has trouble dealing with what just happened. Later on in the episode, it is decided that since the side-effects of the metronome are currently unknown, Steve is to be placed under constant supervision. He is last seen going to dinner with the rest of the agents. In "Personal Effects," he discovers the side effect of using the metronome is that injuries he sustains will impact Claudia rather than himself. In "There's Always a Downside," Steve reveals to Myka his potentially dangerous connection with Claudia and the metronome and how he hasn't yet told Claudia about it. Myka urges him to start looking for a solution that doesn't involve him taking himself off the metronome - advice he takes, suggesting to Artie at the end of the episode that he would like to take some time away from missions, processing information about the metronome. In "Fractures," Steve finally reveals to Claudia the connection that the metronome has given them after Claudia feels the pain of a stab wound that Steve received protecting Artie. Claudia doesn't seem surprised to receive the news but says that Steve should've told her. Claudia gets upset when Steve says that he wanted to disconnect himself from the metronome before telling her and says that now that she knows, they can work as a team to figure out what to do about the connection.

In "Second Chance," Steve and Claudia travel to Steve's hometown to visit his mother (Laura Innes) and see about getting him off the metronome. It is revealed that Steve and his mother have a complicated relationship, but the only way to get him off the metronome is to perform a complete act of love towards her. He ends up throwing the metronome against the fireplace, shattering it in a burst of light, and miraculously starts breathing on his own. In "Runaway," Steve's (presumably most recent) ex-boyfriend is revealed to be Liam Napier, a U.S. Marshal. The latter assists the team in covering up the involvement of an artifact in an Arkansas jailbreak. During Claudia's birthday party, he admits that he said a perfect goodbye to Liam. Claudia, Pete, and Myka eventually find out that he 'slept' with Liam and congratulate him happily. Jinks' status in the Warehouse computer is currently listed as "Un-Deceased." The QR code is shown in 'Personal Effects' reads verbatim: "Steven Jinks (W13 Agent NXN43772632-30032). Murdered by Walter Sykes. Revived."

== Recurring warehouse personnel ==
=== Warehouse agents ===
==== James MacPherson ====
James MacPherson (Roger Rees) is a former Warehouse Agent who was Artie Nielsen's partner. According to his backstory, he and Artie had a falling out, fifteen years previously, when MacPherson used the "Phoenix" artifact to rescue his wife, Carol Augustine (Lynne Cormack), from a fire that killed five firefighters (whenever the Phoenix is used to save a life, at least one other person must die). MacPherson went to prison, but he escaped two years later and disappeared. He returns in Season 1 as Artie's nemesis. He is acquiring and selling Warehouse artifacts to release them back into the world. He demonstrates a great wealth of knowledge of paranormal artifacts which he uses to accomplish his goals. Though numerous attempts have been made to capture him over the years, he remains large until the Season 2 premiere, "Time Will Tell," when he is killed in the Warehouse. In the following episode, his ghost seems to haunt the Warehouse but is seen only by Artie. His ghost's last act is to lead Artie to his room at Leena's—duplicated and stored in the Warehouse like all former agents—to show him a pocket watch that the two of them had argued over; the watch is accompanied by a note willing it to Artie. In the Season 4 premiere, we learn, "A New Hope" that the watch is the key to the location of a device having the power to reverse the destruction wrought by Walter Sykes in the Season 3 finale.

In the Season 3 episode, "The Greatest Gift," Pete accidentally uses a Christmas artifact to create a parallel timeline where MacPherson is in charge of the Warehouse, Artie has been banished from the Warehouse and imprisoned, and Myka and Claudia were never recruited into the Warehouse. As the only one who remembered the original universe, Pete gathered his team together to fight MacPherson. MacPherson killed Artie in the same way he died in the original universe, moments before Pete erased the alternate universe and restored the original timeline.

==== Hugo Miller ====
Hugo Miller (René Auberjonois) was a computer genius and Warehouse agent in the late 1970s. In his quest to create a virtual artificial intelligence (AI), he attempted to use an artifact to copy his mind into the Warehouse software, which failed. He did succeed in transferring (not copying) half his mind, causing him to be committed to a mental hospital. In Season 2, when the dormant AI emerged and took control of the Warehouse, Artie and the team used the artifact to reverse the process and restore Hugo's mind. He reappears in the Season 3 episode "Love Sick" to help Artie when an artifact-enhanced computer virus begins to infect people, leading to the cellular degeneration of their bodies and eventually death. In the same episode, he had a relationship with Vanessa Calder when they were both active Warehouse Agents.

==== Rebecca St. Clair ====
Rebecca St. Clair (1929–2010) (Roberta Maxwell), was a former Warehouse Agent under an unknown last name (although she is called Agent St. Clair in the episode "3... 2... 1"). Her years of service are unknown, though it is established she was already an agent in 1961. She left Warehouse 13 after the disappearance of her partner and lover, Jack Secord. She changed her last name and moved to St. Louis, Missouri, in 1965, where she worked as an elementary school teacher until retirement. She twice assists Agents Lattimer and Bering in solving various cases (episodes "Burnout" and "Where and When"). Stricken with terminal cancer, she dies while going back in time to 1961, using H.G. Wells' Time Machine to spend her final moments with Jack. The young Rebecca (Alex Paxton-Beesley) appears in flashbacks in the episodes "Where and When" and "3... 2... 1".

==== Jack Secord ====
Jack Secord (Chad Connell), was a former U.S. Marine and Secret Service Agent; it was said that he received "vibes" similar to later Warehouse Agent Pete Lattimer. He was recruited by the Warehouse in 1955 and went missing in 1962. In the episode "Burnout," his body is found sealed up in an abandoned cellar, an act of self-sacrifice to entomb a dangerous artifact that had attached itself to his body. He was romantically involved with his partner Rebecca (St. Clair). Jack's character is seen in flashback in the episodes "Where and When" and "3...2...1."

=== Warehouse Caretakers ===
==== Mrs. Irene Frederic ====
Mrs. Irene Frederic (C. C. H. Pounder) is the director of the Warehouse program and Caretaker of Warehouse 13. A shadowy figure who suddenly appears and disappears, she is Artie's immediate superior, and answers to the Regents. As the Caretaker, some mental link exists between her and the Warehouse, giving her, among other advantages, a complete mental inventory of all artifacts in Warehouse 13. Another result of this is that her life and the Warehouse's life are linked; both die if one dies. She is immune to natural death, resulting in her appearance never changing despite her advanced age. In the "Pilot" episode, Dickinson's research uncovers that she worked for the Treasury Department in the 1950s. It is revealed in the season 2 episode "Where and When" that she has been in charge at the Warehouse since at least 1961. Mrs. Frederic had at least one child, a son, but in the season 4 episode "No Pain, No Gain," we learn that she has long outlived him. She maintains a current relationship with her grandson, who is now an older man. In the Season 3 finale, Mrs. Frederic dies because of the Warehouse's destruction, her body aging into a skeleton to indicate her long life. In the Season 4 premiere, Artie uses Magellan's astrolabe to reverse time, restore the Warehouse, and undo her death. Because of Artie's behavioral change regarding H.G. Wells, Mrs. Frederic suspects that Artie has "done something," hinting that she may know that he used the astrolabe. She shows Artie that one of the braids in her hair is now silver, enhancing her suspicions. Mrs. Frederic teaches Claudia how to be a caretaker, showing her an artifact being born when a woman is wounded saving a baby during a store robbery. But she also shows the downside of the position by visiting a nursing home where Mrs. Frederic's grandson (who appears to be in his 60s) resides, showing the consequences of a long life.

==== Paracelsus ====
Paracelsus (Anthony Stewart Head) is an incarcerated "bronzed" alchemist, whom Nick tricked Claudia into releasing. He is the brother of Sutton and the reason for his family's immortality. He was a former director of the Warehouse program and the Caretaker of Warehouse 9. He is stated as being the creator of the Philosopher's stone. After he is debronzed, he pieces together the stone's two halves and makes Sutton, Nick, and Charlotte mortal once again. He escapes before Myka and Pete can stop him and goes to San Francisco. He heals cancer patients with the stone, only to sacrifice them once again to achieve immortality. He could "see" people through their eyes, namely their health. He was caretaker of warehouse 9

=== Warehouse regents ===
==== Benedict Valda ====
Benedict Valda (Mark Sheppard) was the most frequently seen Regent through the series' first two seasons. The Regents are the executive board of the Warehouses. Valda first appeared in the season 1 episode "Breakdown," in which the Regents question Artie about his capability. This was Artie's first meeting with the Regents. Valda appeared more frequently in season 2; in "Beyond Our Control," he joins Mrs. Frederic in an attempt to remove MacPherson's energy from Leena's brain using a combination of artifacts, while in "Around the Bend," he is introduced to Pete, Myka, and Claudia, and becomes the target of Pete's temporary insanity. In the season 2 episode "Buried," Valda is revealed to be the Regents' expert on Warehouse 2. He sacrifices himself in the Warehouse's Hallway of Death trap to allow Pete, Myka, and Helena to move on. His voice is briefly heard when Artie watches Leena's statement (that all Warehouse employees record upon joining, stating they understand the job's risks), interviewing her.

In season 5, in an alternate timeline created by Paracelsus, Valda was his right-hand man. Although the timeline was eliminated by Pete, Valda was holding onto a tuning fork that he'd found in Pete's bag which proved to be an artifact that protected him from his timeline's erasure. Valda attempts to take power over the Warehouse for himself, but Pete manages to neutralize the tuning fork, but not before Claire Donovan transfers the telekinetic rage that an artifact gave her into Valda. No longer protected from the erasure of his timeline, the alternate Valda is erased from existence, taking Claire's telekinetic rage with him and curing her.

==== Adwin Kosan ====
Adwin Kosan (Faran Tahir) is the highest-ranking Warehouse Regent and the primary decision-maker for personnel matters. Kosan approved the reinstatement to active duty of Helena G. Wells and Myka Bering. In Season 3, he is one of the few Regents to survive Walter Sykes' orchestrated attacks. When meeting with other Regents, he uses a business card with the name "Diana K Snow," which is an anagram for Adwin Kosan.

==== Theodora Stanton ====
Theodora Stanton (Paula Boudreau) is a Warehouse Regent who appears in the episodes "Breakdown," "Trials," and "The 40th Floor"; she is also the proprietor of Ted's Restaurant in Univille. She is one of the Regents who approved Myka Bering’s reinstatement to the Warehouse following her temporary leave. Using the Triangle Shirtwaist Factory fire doorknob, Sally Stukowski (Ashley Williams) tortures and kills her during Walter Sykes' reign of terror. While under duress, she gives up the location where three fellow Regents are sheltered.

==== Lok Archer ====
Lok Archer (name of both character and actor) is a Warehouse Regent who appears briefly in the episodes "Breakdown", "Trials", and "Shadows". In the latter episode, he is seen only as a corpse after being murdered by Walter Sykes. It is from Archer that Sykes learns of the ancient regent sanctum and the portal into Warehouse 13.

==== Jane Lattimer ====
Jane Lattimer (Kate Mulgrew) is a Warehouse Regent and the Guardian. She is also the mother of agent Pete Lattimer. She has kept many secrets about Warehouse 13, which, at first, left Pete feeling he does not really know her. They take a trip back to memory lane in the episode "Shadows," which helps him understand she was only trying to protect him. All Regents are selected for their areas of expertise: Jane's is dealing with children. In "The 40th Floor", she becomes the Guardian of Warehouse 13 and is entrusted with the Remati Shackle, which is the last line of defense for Warehouse 13 in the face of disaster.

==== Mr. Keeler ====
Mr. Keeler (Jeffery R. Smith) is a Warehouse Regent who appears in the episodes "Emily Lake," "A New Hope," and "Endless Wonder." He is the manager of the Valu-Mart in Elk Ridge, South Dakota, which is a cover for the Regent Vault that once safeguarded the Janus Coin containing the essence of Helena G. Wells. Keeler also has a Master of History degree from the fictional South Dakota University, Rapid City, where he has access to a private Regent Library. Keeler, along with Leena (Genelle Williams), plays an important role in decoding the location of the alidade to Ferdinand Magellan's astrolabe. He and Leena also research the artifact, Gandhi’s dhoti, used to defuse Walter Sykes' bomb. He is killed by Benedict Valda (from Paracelsus' alternate timeline, not the real Valda) in Endless Wonder.

=== Other personnel ===
==== Dr. Abigail Cho ====
Dr. Abigail Cho (Kelly Hu) is introduced in the Season 4 episode "The Sky's the Limit" as the new proprietress of Leena's Bed and Breakfast. She is a former Warehouse psychologist whom the regents brought out of retirement to help Artie deal with his grief over Leena's death and, more generally, to assess and aid in the mental well-being of all Warehouse 13 personnel. She is officially revealed to be "The Keeper," a failsafe of all classified information regarding the entire history of the Warehouses 1–13.

==== Dr. Vanessa Calder ====
Dr. Vanessa Calder (Lindsay Wagner) is the official Warehouse physician and, as a cover, works for the Centers for Disease Control and Prevention (CDC). Artie, who is attracted to Vanessa, was using an artifact to regrow his appendix every year for Vanessa to remove until he was encouraged by Pete's advice to ask her on a date. Vanessa and Artie have feelings for each other, which they finally admit at the end of the "Love Sick" episode. Vanessa was also called upon in the episode "Buried" to care for Mrs. Frederic when her brain was being eclipsed by Warehouse 2; she was prepared to transfer the Caretaker status from Mrs. Frederic to Claudia, but this was resolved when Warehouse 2 was shut down. Dr. Calder also appears in the Alphas episode "Never Let Me Go," establishing that, along with Eureka, Alphas takes place in the same continuity as Warehouse 13.

== Other recurring characters ==
=== Family members ===
==== Joshua Donovan ====
Joshua Donovan (Tyler Hynes), Claudia Donovan's older brother who also possesses an unusually high IQ. He is a long-time friend of Arthur Nielsen and formerly the protégé of Professor Reynolds (a pseudonym for MacPherson). In college, he conducted experiments with teleportation using Rheticus' Compass, attempting to use it before finding all of the instructions and was believed dead after activating the device. Claudia and Artie discovered that Joshua had been suspended in inter-dimensional limbo and carried out the final instruction to bring Josh back to the corporeal realm. After returning, Claudia convinced him to pursue his passion for physics, and in 2010 he obtained a job at the particle physics laboratory at the European Organization for Nuclear Research (CERN). He visits his sister during the season 2 Christmas episode "Secret Santa". Due to being suspended in time for twelve years, he appears to be approximately the same age as his sister.

==== Amanda Lattimer ====
Amanda Lattimer (Jeri Ryan) is the ex-wife of Pete and a fellow US Marine. She first appears in the Season 3 episode "Queen for a Day", in which she is marrying Michael Martin (Anthony Lemke). Because of this, she visits Pete at Leena's B&B to collect her grandfather's wedding ring, at which point an artifact from Warehouse 2 accidentally falls into her bag. The artifact causes her bridal party to become obsessively devoted to her, nearly killing her husband to be. Pete and Myka manage to save her wedding, and Amanda finds out about artifacts and Pete's new job. She is depicted as an active duty Marine with the rank of major. Amanda returns in the Season 4 episode "The Ones You Love", in which she is sent an artifact by the man targeting the Warehouse team to distract Pete from the real culprit, whose identity becomes apparent at the end of the episode.

==== Tracy Bering ====
Tracy Bering (Amy Acker) is Myka's younger sister, who describes her as "the pretty one that all the boys were crazy about." Tracy is talked about in the episodes "Age Before Beauty" and "No Pain, No Gain" before first appearing on screen in the Season 4 episode "The Ones You Love". In the later episode, Tracy is sent and falls under the influence of an artifact to distract Myka. Tracy is married and is pregnant with her first child during Season 4.

==== Claire Donovan ====
Claire Donovan (Chryssie Whitehead) is the sister of Joshua and Claudia Donovan. She was thought to have been killed in the car crash that killed their parents but was revealed to be alive, kept in an artifact induced coma. Artie used a sample of her blood to unbronze Claudia. Then she is used as a puppet by a villain until Claudia reaches her through an old song they shared. Now she is fine and reunited with Claudia.

=== Love interests ===
Dr. Vanessa Calder (Lindsay Wagner) enters into a romantic relationship in Season 3 with Artie Nielsen (Saul Rubinek). The other agents keep teasing him about it because he primps before seeing her. But he always denies it. Their liaison is brief because Artie loves her and doesn't want to put her in danger.

==== Todd ====
Todd (Nolan Gerard Funk) was a Univille hardware store clerk who becomes romantically involved with Claudia Donovan in season 2. An IT guy hired by mobster John Conti to recover a computer hard drive; when he sees some files he shouldn't have, he ends up in South Dakota in the Witness Protection Program. Todd is forced to relocate shortly after his involvement with Claudia.

==== Dr. Kelly Hernandez ====
Dr. Kelly Hernandez (Paula Garcés), Univille's veterinarian, is romantically involved with Pete Lattimer during the later part of Season 2. Recovering from a bad relationship, she moved to Univille in search of a quiet and simple life. She first meets Pete as he and Myka are investigating an artifact placed in Univille. Although Pete and Kelly are initially antagonistic to each other, they begin dating in "For The Team". She believes Pete's cover story that he is an IRS agent working at a warehouse that houses fifty years of tax returns. However, when Helena G. Wells sends her Lizzie Borden's compact to create a diversion, she attempts to kill Pete under its influence and discovers that Pete's career is far more dramatic than his IRS agent cover story implies. As a result, she breaks up with him and leaves town.

==== Carol Augustine ====
Carol Augustine (Lynne Cormack), who appears in "Implosion" and "MacPherson", was a love interest of both Artie Nielsen (Saul Rubinek) and James MacPherson (Roger Rees). She chose MacPherson, and they were married. Fifteen years ago, in a backstory, MacPherson saved her from a burning building using the Phoenix artifact, which drove the final wedge between him and Artie. When MacPherson was imprisoned, Carol blamed Artie. When Artie meets with Carol today, she is still bitter, though Artie insists she chose poorly by marrying James instead of him.

=== Government agents ===
==== Sam Martino ====
Sam Martino (Gabriel Hogan) was a Secret Service Agent previously partnered with Myka Bering and stationed in Denver, Colorado. In 2008, Sam was shot and killed in the line of duty while protecting the President. Before his death, he is separated from his wife and in a romantic relationship with Myka. For a time, Myka partially blames herself for Sam's death. In the Season 3 episode "Past Imperfect", Myka, with Pete Latimer's help, solves the mystery of Sam's death and brings justice to those responsible. Sam is seen in flashbacks in the episode "Past Imperfect", and he appears to Myka in visions in the Season 1 episodes "Pilot" and "Regrets".

==== Kate Logan ====
Kate Logan (Tia Carrere) is a U.S. Secret Service Agent who once had a relationship with Warehouse Agent Pete Lattimer. In the episode "Around the Bend", she is assigned to the Chicago, Illinois, Field Office; and, in the episode "Vendetta", she is found working a case in Washington, D.C.

==== Marcus Diamond ====
Marcus Diamond (Sasha Roiz), formerly a police officer, is an employee and associate of Walter Sykes. He helps Sykes in executing his plan of murdering the Warehouse Regents. He kills Sally Stukowski at the end of "The 40th Floor" by giving her a lethal injection. Sykes assigns him the task of recruiting Steve Jinks to their cause. At some time in the past, Diamond was shot in the chest three times and killed in the line of duty, but he is revived by Sykes using Johann Maelzel's Metronome. At the end of Season 3, he dies once again when Claudia stops the metronome keeping him alive.

==== Sally Stukowski ====
Sally Stukowski (Ashley Williams), is an FBI Agent who in actuality is assisting Walter Sykes with his plan to murder the Warehouse Regents. When she is working with the FBI or interacting with the Warehouse agents, she speaks with a southern accent, but she is later revealed to be from Connecticut. She is a ruthless and sadistic woman who will torture and kill to achieve her ends, including the brutal murder of Warehouse Regent Theodora Stanton. In "The 40th Floor", she uses the "Anarchy Aerosol Paint Can", though unsuccessfully, in an attempt to bring down a skyscraper housing three Regents and their security force. When she becomes a liability to Sykes' cause, she is killed by Marcus Diamond.

=== Civilians ===
==== Walter Sykes ====
Walter Sykes (Anthony Michael Hall) was a young boy bound to his wheelchair who uses Carlo Collodi's Bracelet to give him the ability to control his own body, enabling him to walk. (First seen in episode "Shadows"). However, the bracelet planted a seed of darkness in his soul, and he is now the man behind A to Z Technologies (named after the A/Z in Aztec his old baseball team), a shell company. The bracelet was taken from him as a boy by Artie and MacPherson when they were active field agents. The bracelet's corruption increased his anger over having the bracelet taken from him and sets up his vendetta against the regents. As an act of revenge, he plans to take down all of the regents and is partially successful in his attacks, killing regents Theodora Stanton, Philip Petrov (Alex Karzis), Lok Archer, and at least four others. Sykes is killed when he is trapped in the portal between Warehouse 13 and the Ancient Regent Sanctum in Hong Kong. He served as the primary antagonist of season three. In season 4, Artie travels back in time to prevent Sykes from destroying the Warehouse, and Sykes is killed, again, when Pete pushes him back through the Sanctum portal and knocking his head on the floor, causing him to die from a fatal head injury. But before dying, he is covered by Gandhi's dhoti, removing his hatred that fuelled the bomb that destroyed the Warehouse. Before dying, a young version of Sykes tells the agents that he is sorry for his actions. On the whole, he is arguably the greatest threat the Warehouse faced.

==== Tyler Struhl ====
Tyler Struhl (Max Morrow) is a computer programmer, hacker, and cyber-peeping tom. In "Love Sick", he causes the death of several young women, turning them to clay when a computer virus he creates starts to infect humans after unintentionally interacting with an artifact. He is recruited by Walter Sykes to hack into Warehouse 13's computer system and steal the Atlas-66 file, which, when decrypted, gives Emily Lake's location and the Janus coin. He is killed in "Stand" by a guillotine-type device after failing to open the chess lock, which, if solved correctly, unlocks a portal between the ancient Regent sanctum and Warehouse 13.

==== Alice Liddell ====
Alice Liddell was the young girl who supposedly inspired the children's classic Alice's Adventures in Wonderland by Lewis Carroll. In reality, she was a sociopathic murderer and "as mad as a hatter".

==== Brother Adrian ====
Brother Adrian (Brent Spiner), a member of the Order of the Black Diamond (a sect under the Vatican's protection), was portrayed by the "evil" within Artie's mind. He was first seen in Series 4 Pilot "A New Hope", trying to stop Artie from using Magellan's Astrolabe to rebuild Warehouse 13. He warns Artie that using the Astrolabe unleashes a terrible evil and is later thought to be the evil himself until it becomes apparent that he was simply a projection of Artie's darker nature. In "We All Fall Down", Mrs. Frederic and Steve release him from the painting in which he is trapped, and he helps them look for ways to repair Artie's mind.

==== Count of St. Germain ====
Sutton (James Marsters) is a 500+-year-old immortal con artist and the brother of Paracelsus. He is a womanizer, often wooing rich older women into marriage and then stealing their fortunes. In modern times, he is a professor at Columbia University, specializing in the Count of St. Germain. He is released from immortality by Paracelsus.

==== Countess of St. Germaine ====
Using the alias Charlotte Dupres, she is, in fact, Sutton's wife (Polly Walker). And after initially appearing to be hostile, she cooperated with Warehouse 13 personnel in tracking down artifacts stolen by a pirate after her son, Nick, infiltrated the warehouse and released Paracelsus. To make amends for her actions, she sacrifices her own life to save Nick and Sutton.

==== Nick ====
Nick (Josh Blaylock) is the 500-year-old immortal son of Charlotte and Sutton. Posing as a homeless teenager, he earned Artie and Claudia's confidence to free his uncle Paracelesus from the bronze section of the warehouse. After releasing Paracelesus from the bronze section, he loses his immortality and his mother. Despite only posing as a fifteen-year-old teen, Nick has the habit of genuinely acting like a teen from time to time.

=== Crossover characters ===
==== Dr. Douglas Fargo ====
Dr. Douglas Fargo (Neil Grayston) is a character from another Syfy show, Eureka. In Season 2, he is brought to the Warehouse by Mrs. Frederic to update the Warehouse's antiquated computer system, accidentally releasing an antagonistic AI program. He and Claudia develop a mutual attraction. In the Season 3 episode "Don't Hate The Player", it is revealed that he tried to create a virtual reality neural interface video game called the B.R.A.I.D and based on Warehouse 13, using a dangerous artifact, Beatrix Potter's tea set.
