= Pilot (Eureka) =

- Eureka episode
- Episode no.: Season 1 Episode 1
- Directed by: Peter O'Fallon
- Written by: Andrew Cosby; Jaime Paglia
- Production code: 101
- Original air date: July 18, 2006

Guest appearances
- Maury Chaykin; Greg Germann; Rob Labelle; Garry Chalk; Jennifer Clement; Zak Ludwig; Chris Gauthier; Kwesi Ameyaw

Episode chronology
| ← Previous — | Next → "Many Happy Returns" |

"Pilot" is the premiere episode of the American science fiction drama Eureka. Although originally broadcast as one 2-hour episode, it functions as the first and second episodes of Season 1.

== Plot synopsis ==
A freak car accident brings U.S. Marshal Jack Carter into the not-so quiet town of Eureka.

While transporting a fugitive (his daughter, Zoe) back to Los Angeles, U.S. Marshal Jack Carter crashes his car near the remote town of Eureka, where the country's greatest minds live and work on the next great scientific advancements. Jack is a fish out of water among the gifted inhabitants. As he comes to realize just what the town is, he gets caught up in the investigation of an experiment gone wrong. Walter Perkins, one of the brightest minds in town, has created a tachyon accelerator that threatens to tear apart reality itself. Before Walter can fix it, however, he is apparently absorbed by his own machine. Even with a town full of geniuses, it seems as if Jack is the only one capable of saving the town. He gets a young autistic savant he befriended earlier to complete Walter's equations, partially destroyed by the antimatter sphere created by Walter's machine. Then town mechanic and resident jack-of-all-trades Henry Deacon and other scientists at the Eureka Advanced Research Facility initiate a reversal to the impending cataclysm before the town — and entire world — are absorbed in the vortex. With the local sheriff injured in the incident, Allison Blake, the D.O.D. government liaison, requests Jack be reassigned as the new sheriff of Eureka.

== Reception ==
The series' premiere performed well, with more than 4.1 million people watching. Eureka was also the Number 1 cable program for that Tuesday night, and was the highest-rated series launch in SciFi's fourteen-year history. John Maynard of the Washington Post noted that "Pilot" was more character driven than special effects driven, which was a good thing because the effects were "so-so."

== See also ==
- Tachyons in fiction
