= List of Eureka episodes =

The following is a list of episodes of the American science fiction television drama Eureka. Seventy-seven episodes were aired over five seasons. In addition to these episodes, there is a short webisode series called "Hide and Seek", which was available on Syfy's Eureka homepage.

The episodes of the first season were not aired in the order intended by the show's creators, resulting in small inconsistencies. However, these were supervised and controlled. In podcast commentaries, the show's creators and its star Colin Ferguson confirmed that the production order was that in which the producers intended. However, network executives changed the order to try to place the stronger episodes earlier in the run to attract viewers.

The creators made minor changes through edits and they redubbed dialogue in later episodes (for instance, they removed the explicit mention of Zoe's first day at school) to minimize audience confusion.

== Series overview ==
Season	Episodes		Originally released	
Season	Episodes		First released	Last released
1	12		July 18, 2006	October 3, 2006
2	13		July 10, 2007	October 2, 2007
3	18	8	July 29, 2008	September 23, 2008
3	18	10	July 10, 2009	September 18, 2009
4	21	10	July 9, 2010	December 7, 2010
4	21	11	July 11, 2011	December 6, 2011
5	13		April 16, 2012	July 16, 2012

== Episodes ==
=== Season 1 (2006) ===
No. overall	No. in series	Title	Directed by	Written by	Original release date
1	1	"Pilot"	Peter O'Fallon	Andrew Cosby & Jaime Paglia	July 18, 2006
U.S. Marshal Jack Carter has a car crash while transporting his fugitive daughter Zoe, and ends up in the small town of Eureka. While waiting for repairs, he begins investigating a series of strange scientific phenomena, first is a missing boy and a destroyed RV, later the local cafe is trashed. During the investigation, Carter befriends some townsfolk including jack-of-all-trades Henry Deacon and Sheriffs Deputy Jo Lupo, but is hindered by Department of Defense liaison Allison Blake who has him arrested when he threatens to call for reinforcements. When the sheriff is crippled, Allison reveals to Jack the town's secret: it is the home to the greatest scientific minds of their time and the existence of "Global Dynamics" (GD), the central research site and forefront of the worlds biggest breakthroughs. Carter tries to mend his relationship with his daughter while uncovering that rogue scientist Walter Perkins has created a tachyon accelerator that is ripping apart the fabric of existence, killing Walter when he tries to fix it. With the world's greatest scientific minds unable to solve the problem, Jack realises that the key rests in Allison’s autistic son Kevin, who solves the equation needed to counter the effects and save the world. At the end, Jack Carter returns to the Marshals to discover he has been promoted: he is now the new Sheriff of Eureka.
2	2	"Many Happy Returns"	Jefery Levy	Andrew Cosby & Jaime Paglia	July 25, 2006
The people of Eureka have just laid Susan Perkins to rest and so Carter and townsfolk are surprised when she returns. However, the dead Susan is a clone of the real Susan, created by Walter Perkins after the real Susan left him because he wanted the perfect life with her. With nowhere to call home other than his own jail cell, Carter is taken by Douglas Fargo to a "smart house", which is operated by the AI SARAH. Nathan Stark, Allison's ex-husband, becomes the head of GD, and instantly clashes with Carter. An amorphous creature causes electrical disturbances in Eureka. The creature is discovered to be Walter, the scientist who created the tachyon accelerator and who is now caught between seconds. At the end of the episode, Carter is speechless when Zoe arrives on his doorstep and moves in.
3	3	"Before I Forget"	Michael Robison	Story by : Karl Schaefer; Teleplay by : John Rogers	August 1, 2006
When a world renowned scientist arrives in Eureka, Carter and Henry find they cannot account for blocks of time. The scientist is using a device built by Henry to emit an electromagnetic pulse that alters people's brain chemistry and disrupts the formation of their short-term memories. The scientist was waiting for others to make scientific breakthroughs, then erasing their memories of it so he could claim the breakthroughs as his own. Unfortunately one woman who has been a repeated victim of him has worked out his scam, and Carter must stop her from taking revenge, if he can remember anything about it.
4	4	"Alienated"	Marita Grabiak	Story by : Varina Bleil & Betsy Landis; Teleplay by : Harry Victor & Dan E. Fesman	August 8, 2006
Spencer, Fargo, Jo, Vincent, and Taggart watch a movie which Spencer hacked from a satellite. The group then start behaving strangely. Spencer is abducted by aliens and returned to Earth the following day, found inside a crop circle. The town is visited by a congressman whose committee is responsible for the town's funding. The GD satellite was designed to cause paranoia in enemies of the US. However, when the group watched the movie, the paranoia beam affected them. They thought they were in the movie and the senator (Garwin Sanford) was host to an alien. The group kidnap the senator. Carter prevents the group excising the alien from the senator and they surrender.
5	5	"Invincible"	Michael Grossman	Dan E. Fesman	August 15, 2006
An artifact gives a scientist, Dr. Carl Carlson (Saul Rubinek), wondrous powers, but at a terrible price. When Carlson finds the truth about the Artifact he runs from Stark. Stark tries to bring Carlson back and, in the process, Carter is injured. Carlson takes Carter to the Artifact and heals him. Carlson then enters the Artifact, never to be seen again.
6	6	"Dr. Nobel"	Jeff Woolnough	Dan E. Fesman & Harry Victor	August 22, 2006
Carter helps an elderly scientist. Dr Thatcher, recover his memory in time to halt a device he has built, a doomsday device that will destroy the world. His mutual assured destruction (M.A.D.) device was designed to fire a beam of irradiated uranium isotopes at a mirror on the Moon, which would bounce back at a target on Earth. However, after failing to win the Nobel Peace Prize for his device, Thatcher has been a changed man. Carter uses a hologram presentation to convince Thatcher that he did win the Nobel Peace Prize, and the scientist regains his right state of mind. Thatcher attempts to turn off the device, but Henry had cut a blue wire earlier, initiating a "dead man's protocol". The device will fire at the Moon in five minutes. Carter drives his Jeep into the device, causing the weapon to miss the Moon and hit a satellite off Jupiter instead.
7	7	"Blink"	Jefery Levy	Andrew Cosby & Jaime Paglia	August 29, 2006
A man dies a mysterious death. Carter suspects foul play but his investigations are being hampered. Scientists from GD have developed a new drug that allows a man to run at 600 mph (966 km/h). The dead man was a scientist who had taken the drug. Fargo starts taking the drug and suffers bad withdrawal symptoms. Dylan, Zoe's new boyfriend, helped to develop the drug and is using it to try and ensure he can stay in Eureka, but when Carter threatens his plans, Dylan overdoses on the drug and attacks him.
8	8	"Right as Raynes"	Michael Rohl	Johanna Stokes	September 5, 2006
A computer programmer, Callister Raynes has left Eureka after a falling out with Stark. His return coincides with an attack on Eureka by a computer virus. Raynes develops a rapport with Zoe. She has recently had a fight with her father. When Raynes is accused of setting a fire, he and Zoe leave Eureka. Carter and Stark go after Raynes and Zoe. Raynes is an android created long ago by Stark.
9	9	"Primal"	Colin Bucksey	Story by : Karl Schaefer & Martin Weiss; Teleplay by : Martin Weiss & Johanna Stokes	September 12, 2006
Nanoids designed to repair living tissue escape from a GD laboratory. The nanoids communicate on the same frequency as Stark's newest gadget, which allows him to connect to the nanoid computer remotely. Many nanoid-constructed androids take Stark's form. They use Stark's dreams and daydreams as their motives, including one about world domination. To destroy them, Carter evokes an emotional response from Stark by flirting, dancing, and kissing Allison. He then uses Spencer's new device, a super-speaker which makes a sound low enough to disrupt the nanoids' communication. The many Stark androids fall apart into dust.
10	10	"Purple Haze"	David Straiton	Story by : Andrew Cosby & Jaime Paglia; Teleplay by : Johanna Stokes	September 19, 2006
The town's residents are acting strangely and in line with their subconscious impulses. Vincent injures a man; Allison almost seduces Carter; Jo acts like a teenage party girl; Henry becomes paranoid and turns to drink; Fargo fights with his neighbour; and Taggart is naked in public. Beverly broadcasts peoples' private matters and Allison tries to kill her. Carter, Zoe, and "SARAH" (the Carters' house), are immune because SARAH is hermetically sealed. Carter deduces the cause is a pollen contagion. He burns the plants responsible and the town returns to normal. At the very end of the episode, Henry reveals he is leaving Eureka.
11	11	"H.O.U.S.E. Rules"	Jeff Woolnough	Harry Victor	September 26, 2006
In the wake of Henry's decision to leave Eureka, SARAH traps Carter, Henry, Allison, Beverly, Fargo, and Nathan in order to protect the town from what she feels is a great danger, the increasing discord among residents and the end of Eureka, beginning with Henry's departure. Jo and Taggart arrive at SARAH later and realize that something is wrong. An attempt to escape SARAH from within initiates Al BRAD (a military feature) and so the captives must choose to live in the house or die leaving it.
12	12	"Once in a Lifetime"	Michael Lange	Story by : Jaime Paglia & Johanna Stokes; Teleplay by : Jaime Paglia & Andrew Cosby	October 3, 2006
Stark is given the opportunity to investigate the Artifact and test it with Kim's help. In the Artifact's Eureka of 2010, Stark is a billionaire; Henry is married to Kim and is the principal of Tesla High School and head of GD; Carter and Allison are married; Zoe is the valedictorian of her graduating class; Jo and Taggart are dating; and a tornado strikes. A body is found near the Artifact. It is Kim Deacon, Henry's wife. Henry explains that in 2006, during Stark's test on the Artifact, Kim was killed by an explosion. He had made use of Walter Perkins's tachyon accelerator to go back in time and stop her from dying. This new timeline caused the current anomalies. Carter goes back to 2006 and prevents Henry from saving Kim, thus returning the timeline to normal. Beverly had implanted a chip in Nathan's neck so the Consortium could gain access to the Artifact.

=== Season 2 (2007) ===
No. overall	No. in series	Title	Directed by	Written by	Original release date
13	1	"Phoenix Rising"	Michael Rohl	Jaime Paglia	July 10, 2007
Following a solar eclipse, some Eureka residents spontaneously combust. They are people who were close to the Artifact explosion. Stark was at risk but is saved when the connection is found. Carter and Henry are adjusting to the restored timeline however Carter keeps confusing his tenses when events don't happen as he remembered them because they are now living in the true timeline. At the conclusion of the episode, Henry erases Carter's memories of the alternate timeline, but chooses to retain his own memories.
14	2	"Try, Try Again"	Michael Nankin	Charlie Craig	July 17, 2007
When Allison becomes director of GD, the computer reboots. The disappearance of a "Category Red" device leads to an unlikely alliance between Carter and Stark. Fargo is caught inside a forcefield that is expanding. It was placed on him by a man who works in the GD Vault. The last time this happened in Eureka, the man inside the shield had to be dropped into a 2 miles (3.2 km) deep pit, and then a three megaton nuclear bomb was dropped on him. Fargo faces the same end. However, the force field's power wanes. It then resumes by draining power from Fargo himself. When he realizes that sound can pass through the force field, Carter uses a super sonic pulse to temporarily stop Fargo's heart. The force field fails and Fargo is resuscitated.
15	3	"Unpredictable"	Robert Lieberman	Thania St. John	July 24, 2007
Zoe's 16th birthday approaches, and her mom Abby arrives in town as a surprise. It is revealed that Carter and his ex-wife had a deal to send Zoe back to California at the end of the year, enraging Zoe. Meanwhile, freak weather events escalate, and Carter's attention is redirected to investigating. It turns out that the freezing of a local lake in Eureka was the source, caused by a device built to control the weather. The designer is initially suspected, but an angry meteorologist whose job is threatened is the culprit. Carter overcomes a hurricane, and uses the device to reheat the lake, returning the weather to normal.
16	4	"Games People Play"	Michael Rohl	Johanna Stokes	July 31, 2007
Carter and Jo investigate a noise complaint, when Carter is hit in the head by a Scientist's device for monitoring electrons, causing him a mild concussion. Zoe is angry because she has to move to California with her mother Abby, and uses a self therapy device to help her work through her fears. Carter, while fearing losing Zoe, inspects her device. Later, the inhabitants of Eureka start disappearing, absorbed by a light, and forgotten to everyone who remains (except to Carter). When the population of Eureka has shrunk to just himself and Zoe, Carter realizes he is trapped in the device. He finally escapes by letting the mysterious light take him and Zoe. Meanwhile, Abby comes to understand Zoe is a part of a good community in Eureka, and decides not to take her away.
17	5	"Duck Duck Goose"	Michael Lange	Ethan Matthew Lawrence	August 7, 2007
Space junk is massing over Eureka, forming a giant debris cloud that threatens to destroy the town and its inhabitants. Carter must find what is drawing it there before disaster strikes. Zoe has interfered with a fellow student's project for the high school science fair, a magnetic array, as revenge for the student ruining her own. The student's device is interacting with the GD electromagnetic shield forming a strong magnet. However the culprit turns out to be the students mother, who had stolen her daughters device to complete her own project on schedule. Carter and the GD scientists resolve the problem.
18	6	"Noche de Sueños"	Eric Laneuville	Jaime Paglia	August 14, 2007
The people of Eureka are suffering an epidemic of shared dreaming. The dreaming is fatal as it causes a compound to build up in the person's spinal cord. Three people die. A neurologist is the originator of the shared dreaming and he has a neural network of fifty people including Carter and Jo. Kevin has a special connection to the Artifact. When Stark and Allison try to enter Kevin's dream using a dream reading device, the Artifact interferes with the neurologist's dreaming. Carter and Jo are part of the neurologist's neural network. When Stark's device is turned off, Carter and Jo are cured.
19	7	"Family Reunion"	Michael Lange	Story by : Jane Espenson; Teleplay by : Anne Cofell Saunders	August 21, 2007
Fargo's grandfather, Dr. Pierre Fargo, is revived from cryogenic suspension in an unmarked sleeper pod at GD. Once awake, he accuses an old rival of locking him in the pod, and stealing his life's work. The rival did steal his work. However, it was Dr. Fargo's best friend who imprisoned him. His best friend was in love with his fiancée. After his release from the pod, Dr Fargo quickly ages.
20	8	"E = MC...?"	Tim Matheson	Bruce Miller	August 28, 2007
Cloned chicken meat is incapacitating the minds of Eureka's scientists. A "Big Bang" device has been made to investigate the origins of the universe. The Eureka residents believe the device is responsible for the incapacitation of the scientists but Carter and Zane Donovan, a clever yet antisocial young man find the truth. Zane prevents the device from exploding. A cloned chicken meat cure is found for the scientists.
21	9	"Sight Unseen"	Donna Deitch	Charlie Craig & Thania St. John	September 4, 2007
Carter and Zoe are investigating some strange happenings. When an abandoned research project on invisibility is reactivated, Carter disappears.
22	10	"God Is in the Details"	Michael Rohl	Eric Wallace	September 11, 2007
Eureka's residents fear they are the victims of a Biblical plague because they have experienced sudden muteness, lethal human bio-luminescence, and faucets running blood. Allison begins to glow. Eureka loses its power supply. A recently widowed woman has built a device that she believes will connect her with her husband in Heaven by creating a temporal rift. Her device, however, is emitting ultrasonic waves that put pressure on human vocal cords, making speech impossible. They are vibrating microorganisms in the water, which release a red dye into the town's water supply. After the device is switched off, Stark brings Kevin to heal Allison.
23	11	"Maneater"	Michael Robison	Bruce Miller	September 18, 2007
Carter becomes irresistible to every woman in Eureka. Objects in Eureka start exploding. Henry enters the water filtration and air conditioning tunnels beneath Eureka to investigate. The scientist in charge of the tunnels has stumbled upon some old Native American bones. He was exposed to a peptide that made him irresistible to his wife, who locked him in his own house. However, before he was locked in the house, he had visited Taggert's lab. When Carter went into the lab, some of the peptide rubbed onto him. In trying to solve the problems, the peptide is put into Eureka's air and Eureka's male residents are affected. Henry solves the problem by pumping his asthma medicine into the air.
24	12	"All That Glitters...A Night at Global Dynamics" (Part 1)	Michael Grossman	Thania St. John	September 25, 2007
Beverly Barlowe returns to town. Eureka is threatened by a parasitic bacterium that turns all metal into gold and then into rust. Fargo becomes trapped under rubble from an affected building. Stark finds a cure which helps save Fargo. Henry finds Beverly in a cell in Stark's lab and sets her free. He hopes she will help separate Kevin from the Artifact so that the associated powers cannot be abused. A mutant form of the parasitic bacteria starts attacking Eureka' residents. GD's security mode locks Allison, Kevin, Henry, and Beverly in the control room. The control room drops into a bunker 1 mile (1.6 km) beneath GD.
25	13	"All That Glitters... A Night at Global Dynamics" (Part 2)	Michael Lange	Jaime Paglia	October 2, 2007
Henry, Allison, Beverly, and Kevin are trapped in a bunker beneath GD. Carter, Taggert, and Stark work to access the bunker. Once rescued, Kevin is separated from the influence of the Artifact with the help of a transportation device. Henry admits he caused the parasitic bacteria incident and is arrested by military police.

=== Season 3 (2008–09) ===
Season three production was interrupted and delayed by the 2007–2008 Writers Guild of America strike.

No. overall	No. in series	Title	Directed by	Written by	Original release date
26	1	"Bad to the Drone"	Bryan Spicer	Jaime Paglia	July 29, 2008
Eva Thorne is a successful corporate "fixer". She has been sent to Eureka by the Department of Defense during the testing of its anti-missile capabilities. A drone called Martha is frightening residents, destroys the Viper (the weapon for shooting drones down) and stalks Carter. Martha destroys Carter's car, and attacks Carter and Jo at the Sheriff's office. The wife of the scientist who built Martha increased the drone's intelligence and gave it a teenage girl's personality. At Cafe Diem, Martha befriends Zoe. Martha attacks Eva and Larry. Martha is taken to GD. Carter and Jo find a remote control receiver on Martha. Larry added the remote control in order to impress Eva but Martha rebelled against it. At GD, Martha releases other drones. They disable Eureka's electromagnetic shield in order to be free. Thorne calls in a squadron of F-16s to stop the drones. Carter, Stark, Fargo, and Allison consider the pros and cons of Martha leaving Eureka. They take the EM shield down, hoping Martha will see it as gesture of good will. The drones and the F-16s charge at each other. Zoe talks to Martha over a radio and convinces her to return to Eureka. The drones disengage and return to GD.
27	2	"What About Bob?"	Fred Gerber	Charlie Craig	August 5, 2008
Carter and Allison investigate the disappearance of a scientist, Bob Nobb from the biosphere, "Lab 27", a 12,000 acre (4.856 ha) area and 0.5 miles (0.80 km) below GD. In the biosphere, Carter and Allison find Bob who is "de-evolving" into a reptile along with ten other people who have lived in the lab over the past eleven years. Stark arrives to help as does a hologram of Henry. All who enter the lab become reptilian humanoids because Bob's garden has been irradiated by another scientist. Bob tries to eat Allison, and so Carter, Stark, and holo-Henry shoot him. A cure for the biosphere related reptilian change is found. Eva Thorne obtains an official pardon for Henry who then returns to Eureka.
28	3	"Best in Faux"	Paul Holohan	Bruce Miller	August 12, 2008
Eureka is sited on a large magma chamber. The Eureka Robotic Dog Show is being interrupted by earthquakes. Some android dogs have had "logic diamonds" placed within them which begin to explode. Usually, the diamonds are only found in the core of the GD main computer but in an abandoned mine, a scientist has been growing logic diamonds from melted coal. She was testing them in the android dogs. Her manufacturing process in the mine melted the nearby bedrock. Using a digger, Carter and Stark reroute the magma into a nearby lake. Fargo's real dog is best in show.
29	4	"I Do Over"	Matt Earl Beesley	Thania St. John	August 19, 2008
On Allison and Stark's wedding day, Carter is trapped in a time loop. Carter's sister, Lexi, arrives. The time loop escalates, threatening the town and beyond. Carter tries everything to escape the time loop, even kissing Allison on her wedding day. A scientist who is also caught in the loop is killed when he tries to fix it. Stark fixes the loop but dematerializes.
30	5	"Show Me the Mummy"	Ernest Dickerson	Curtis Kheel	August 26, 2008
The opening of an ancient Egyptian tomb releases a swarm of lethal insects which use humans as their hosts. The only thing that kills the insects is cold. Carter and the GD lure the insects into the refrigerator at Cafe Diem and lower the temperature to 0 K (−273 °C; −460 °F).
31	6	"Phased and Confused"	Michael Robison	Nick Wauters	September 9, 2008
A man who has a device allowing him to fly and also to walk through walls appears in Eureka. He wishes to impress Lexi. When Zoe slips and falls in a strange substance, Zoe, Zane, and their friends become trapped in a long forgotten World War II bunker and the man becomes stuck in a wall. Carter puts on the man's device and saves Zoe, Zane, and their friends. The man's device makes the user intangible, but Allison and Henry manage to cure Carter.
32	7	"Here Come the Suns"	Oz Scott	Jaime Paglia & Eric Wallace	September 16, 2008
On election day in Eureka, when Lexi is expecting twin boys, an artificial sun built by a student at Tesla School threatens to go supernova. The sun is burning a special hydrogen that a mayoral candidate has released into the clouds to create campaigning advertisements. Using a heat protective gel from Fargo and Vincent, Carter, and Zane approach the heat and steam of the cloud farm. Carter and Zane find the device and fire it into the artificial sun which dies. Henry is made Mayor of Eureka.
33	8	"From Fear to Eternity"	Eric Laneuville	Thania St. John	September 23, 2008
The team discover a doomsday weapon (a type of bomb) in an abandoned military complex. Also discovered, despite Eva Thorne's wishes to the contrary is Mary Perkins. Mary is a 107-year-old woman who was involved in a pre-Eureka research project that developed the first atomic bombs (using radioactive material from meteorites). Jo and Zane become stuck together. Zoe's slip into the strange material in the last episode causes an aging illness which might kill her and has already killed Mary's colleagues. Allison is carrying Stark's child. Eva Thorne sacrifices her only chance to be cured to save Zoe. Radiation from the strange material is being released into the town. The team realizes that the doomsday weapon was a fail-safe to neutralize the radiation if it was ever released. The bomb is triggered and the town is saved. Meanwhile, Jo and Zane are finally freed and renew their relationship. Jack allows Eva Thorne to leave. General Mansfield tells Carter that his services are no longer required.
34	9	"Welcome Back Carter"	Matthew Diamond	Bruce Miller	July 10, 2009
Following Carter's dismissal, Fargo and General Mansfield field-test a robotic sheriff named "Andy". However, the robot is the target of random gravitational anomalies which crush him. Carter attempts to stop the anomalies. Andy, being a robot, considers the chances of fixing the problem low and declines to help but inspired by Carter's bravery, he decides to go ahead. Together, Andy and Carter succeed. Andy realizes that Carter should be Sheriff of Eureka and finds a loop hole in the town charter allowing Carter to be restored to the position. At the end of the episode an alien object is detected heading for Eureka.
35	10	"Your Face or Mine?"	Colin Ferguson	Jaime Paglia	July 17, 2009
Carter must undergo the bi-annual Department of Defense re-certification test. The test which is conducted outside Eureka, takes 48 hours. Jo, who has passed the test with a perfect score, fills in for Carter and looks after Zoe. Allison wants to put in a new security measure that requires a DNA scan to access various places within GD. Henry does not want to install the new device, so Jo is called in to give the deciding vote. Jo decides to have the devices installed and is the first one scanned for identification. However, the device malfunctions due to sabotage and Jo receives an electrical shock. Allison wants Carter to return but Jo feels she can find the saboteur herself. When Jo tells Henry a piece of the security device is missing, he says he is also missing an important piece of equipment. At home, Jo tells Zoe she cannot go out but Zoe does sneak out to perform at Café Diem. Jo finds Zoe but instead of chastising her, she joins in the fun, drinking too much as she sings and flirts with Fargo. Jo kisses Fargo just as Zane enters the café. Allison, Henry, and Zane are concerned by Jo's behavior. When a third theft occurs at GD, the DNA scanner identifies Jo as the thief. Only Jo knows that someone is stealing her identity, gene by gene. Trapped in that person's body, Jo has to convince a skeptical Zane of her true identity. Fargo confronts the fake Jo and forces her to confess. Henry stabilizes Jo's DNA.
36	11	"Insane in the P-Brane"	Steve Miner	Thania St. John	July 24, 2009
Dr. Drechmeyer says he has been contacted by his late mother, a famed clairvoyant. He thinks that the readings on his new energy-measuring device indicate the presence of ghosts. His laboratory partner and ex-wife, Mary-Beth Curtis, is worried that Drechmeyer's obsession with ghosts will result in cancellation of their scientific funding. Strange things begin to occur. Dr. Tess Fontana, a new scientist who has been brought in to reopen section 5 at GD, has left her car in the middle of the road. When Carter asks her about it, she denies leaving it there. GD gives Lexi, "Invis-Apparel" which hides her twin pregnancy. The twin's father, Duncan arrives unexpectedly. Lexi hides her pregnancy from him. Later, at Café Diem, Carter finds Drechmeyer who claims ghosts are present. Suddenly, objects in the café fly about. Allison arrives and greets Tess warmly as they are college friends. When Tess shows Carter section 5, they find an unknown device and feel some odd sensation. On leaving the laboratory, they realize that no one can see or hear them. They wonder if they are dead but Tess thinks they have crossed into another dimension. They return to the lab where Dr. Johnson is recovering from an unsuccessful attempt to break out. His research into inter-dimensional travel created a temporary door into the "Fifth Dimension". Henry and Allison are trying to shut down the device. If Dr. Johnson, Tess, and Carter cannot calibrate the device before it is shut down, they may be trapped forever.
37	12	"It's Not Easy Being Green"	Sarah Pia Anderson	Curtis Kheel	July 31, 2009
Fargo, Lucas, and Big Ed "The Cleaner" Fowler (a bowling champion), prepare for a bi-annual bowling competition against Toby Bismark and his team from Area 51. Cheating, called "creative enhancement of odds" is part of the game. However, the Eureka team members turn green "with envy" when they are dosed with gamma radiation. Allison and Tess are investigating a signal from space. They ask Carter and Jo to requisition all of the Eureka residents' Globidium power cells in order to power their telescope. However, the power cells are being stolen. Carter finds that Big Ed is the power cell thief, but before he can be arrested, he disappears leaving a puddle of thick green fluid. Big Ed had a pet project that went wrong, the container for Big Ed's radiation devouring microorganisms is empty and the microorganisms have eaten Big Ed. Duncan cures the green players with a mud bath. The microorganisms, now hungry for Globidium, use Eureka's drainage system to get to the last source at the Smart House. Zoe is safe but Lexi and Duncan are not.
38	13	"If You Build It..."	Mike Rohl	Bruce Miller	August 7, 2009
Five unfinished plasma generators made out of scrap objects from all over Eureka appear in the woods. Carter and Tess stake out the site to see who is making them. When night falls, all the teenagers of Eureka arrive and start working on the generators. Carter takes the teenagers (including Zoe) to the GD infirmary. There, they wake with no memory of the generators. The following evening, the teenagers arrive again at the generators and are halted by the GD security men. On following nights, other townsfolk, including Zane, continue the construction of the generators. Carter and Henry realize that the affected people are those whose cars have been integrated into the Eureka Smart Asphalt automatic driving system. The grid is shut down and all those who are affected fall into a coma. The building of the generators has originated in the signal from space. The people of Eureka finish the generators and they create a torrent of blue energy that shoots up into the sky. Allison prepares to shoot down the incoming ship (the origin of the signal) until Fargo arrives. Fargo, who was previously held hostage by his car's Artificial Intelligence system (Tabitha), arrives on the scene to tell Alison that the device that everyone has been building is a Boson Cloud Exciter, a catcher's mitt for a faster than light space jump. The ship lands. Henry approaches it and scrapes some dust from the side revealing a US flag.
39	14	"Ship Happens"	Chris Fisher	Charlie Craig	August 14, 2009
The return of Henry's ship brings with it a surprise: his former love, Kim, a creation of the ship's organic computer, is on board. When people start spontaneously dying of electrocution a short time later, Kim 2.0 initially comes under suspicion. Henry finds a new kind of virus infecting the affected residents of Eureka, though, and it turns out Kim may have the only possible solution.
40	15	"Shower the People"	Stephen Surjik	Thania St. John	August 21, 2009
Jack investigates the deaths of scientists who have drowned in unusual circumstances following Allison's baby shower. The trail eventually leads back to an attempt to extract the data stored in Kim 2.0's cells and the unusual properties of synthetic water.
41	16	"You Don't Know Jack"	James Head	Eric Wallace	August 28, 2009
Tess is collecting memories for a time capsule. Jack and Allison are trapped inside during a sonic cleaning at Global Dynamics when the townsfolk of Eureka begin to suffer lacunar amnesia. Allison's baby is born. (Although this is a clip show, it has a full plot.)
42	17	"Have an Ice Day"	Joe Morton	Story by : Joan Binder Weiss & Constance M. Burge; Teleplay by : Bruce Miller & Charlie Craig	September 11, 2009
Tess hopes her first day in charge of GD will be uneventful. The arrival of an Arctic ice core brings a new Ice Age to Eureka as ice begins growing across the town faster than it can be melted. Zane, meanwhile, returns from a month-long expedition with Taggart, but his behavior toward Jo is as cold as the refrigeration unit he has designed to maintain the ice core. There's no obvious connection until Carter notes that Zane isn't dressed like everyone else.
43	18	"What Goes Around, Comes Around"	Matt Hastings	Jaime Paglia	September 18, 2009
As Zoe prepares to leave for college, a number of Eureka's citizens begin discussing the return of Nemesis, the neutron star theorized to pass through the solar system at regular intervals, causing major extinction events. Lucas is considering a disaster closer to home: Zoe's imminent absence. In an attempt to gain a similar early start at MIT, he creates a device meant to stabilize the Earth's magnetic field should the approach of Nemesis one day destabilize it. The device of course backfires, creating a new magnetic pole over Eureka. Tess, meanwhile, receives a job offer in Australia, which she decides to pursue in spite of her burgeoning relationship with Carter.

=== Season 4 (2010–11) ===
Season four included the first crossover event with the Syfy series Warehouse 13. Douglas Fargo (Neil Grayston) appeared in the August 3, 2010 episode of Warehouse 13, while Claudia Donovan (Allison Scagliotti) of Warehouse 13 appeared on Eureka on August 6, 2010. James Callis joined the cast as Dr. Trevor Grant, a scientist from 1947.

Season 4 was made in two parts and two stand alone Christmas specials. The first nine episodes were shown in the US summer of 2010. A Christmas episode was shown in December 2010 and another 10 episodes began airing on July 11, 2011. A second Christmas special aired on December 6, 2011.

No. overall	No. in series	Title	Directed by	Written by	Original release date	US viewers (millions)
44	1	"Founders' Day"	Matt Hastings	Jaime Paglia	July 9, 2010	2.52
While celebrating the anniversary of the town's founding, Carter, Lupo, Blake, Deacon, and Fargo inadvertently travel to the year 1947, when Eureka was a secret military base. Carter, Lupo and Fargo are arrested by the military of 1947 for spying. Blake and Deacon fit in as a nurse and mechanic respectively. Deacon determines they were transported by a space-time bridge that was created by a device built by Einstein and his associate Dr. Trevor Grant. Grant (James Callis) helps the group return to the present day. The group's presence in 1947 makes changes to the present: Jo never dated Zane; Kevin is no longer autistic; Henry is married to Grace (someone he barely knows); and Jack and Tess are still together. Additionally, Grant has traveled from 1947 to the present.
45	2	"A New World"	Michael Robison	Bruce Miller	July 16, 2010	2.21
Deacon works on the space-time bridge device to reset the timeline but further anomalies occur. Allison learns that Fargo is the director of GD, and she is the medical director. Andy replaces Lupo. Lupo is the head of security at GD. Grant is discovered in the present and says he came because he wanted to see the future. The space-time bridge device overloads due to positronic lightning created by the alternate Fargo. Carter, Andy, and Grant volunteer for the dangerous job of shutting down the device. Deacon finds that the time-space bridge device is damaged beyond repair. The six travelers agree that they must never reveal that they changed the timeline.
46	3	"All the Rage"	Michael Rohl	Kira Snyder	July 23, 2010	2.29
Carter is uncomfortable with Tess moving in with him. Meanwhile, Fargo has trouble coping with being director of GD. Everyone at GD becomes confused and angry after witnessing a scientific demonstration in the non-lethal weapons laboratory that goes wrong. Allison, Carter, and Tess were not at GD at the time. Tess corrects the malfunction and everyone recovers. Carter dumps Tess. Deacon and Grant work on repairing the space-time bridge. However, everything involved in the repair disintegrates at their touch.
47	4	"The Story of O2"	Colin Ferguson	Story by : Jill Blotevogel; Teleplay by : Eric Tuchman	July 30, 2010	2.27
Space Week begins normally with a rocket race to the moon and back. Zane, in a drunken state, crashes an expensive prototype in front of General Mansfield. Jo struggles to find him innocent. Eureka becomes super-saturated with oxygen. The returning rockets may combust the oxygen. An unlikely culprit is revealed, along with an unlikely savior of the day, and a small moment of comfort for Jo. Carter struggles to deal with independent Zoe's new life away at college when he pays her a surprise visit.
48	5	"Crossing Over"	Michael Robison	Paula Yoo	August 6, 2010	2.56
This episode is a crossover episode with Warehouse 13. Claudia Donovan is invited to Eureka. In Eureka, she finds objects arriving from 1947. Grant is acting as a magnet through time. The problem is corrected but Grant can no longer return to 1947.
49	6	"Momstrosity"	Michael Rohl	Terri Hughes Burton & Ron Milbauer	August 13, 2010	2.52
The Artificial Intelligence elements in Eureka are behaving oddly. Carter, Fargo, Grant, and Kevin have gone camping. They are attacked by a rogue Titan rover unit. The unit has developed parental feelings toward a tiny emotional robot that was assigned to Kevin for a school project in health class. Deputy Andy develops a crush on Jo. Turns out S.A.R.A.H. developed a crush on Andy and uploaded the emo robots programming to all the higher level AIs in Eureka so that he could fall for her as well. Zane fixes all the rogue AIs but leaves Andys' as is. Henry tells Grace about his time travel so they can restart their relationship.
50	7	"Stoned"	Joe Morton	Eric Wallace	August 20, 2010	2.30
Zoe visits Eureka and finds Jo fuming over delays in the rebuilding of her house. A fossil has been discovered on the site and progress has been halted. When those who visited the site begin turning to stone, the race is on to find a cure. Zane takes particular interest in Zoe's welfare, and Jo learns that he and Zoe have become attracted to each other. Meanwhile, Henry begins trying to once again woo Grace and Carter finally makes his move on Allison -- a move Dr. Grant would likely have objected to had he not been embroiled in his own troubles maintaining his assumed identity.
51	8	"The Ex-Files"	Chris Fisher	Amy Berg	August 27, 2010	2.44
Henry and Grace's relationship therapy devices malfunction at a party, causing the main characters to see visions of people from their pasts: Jack sees Nathan Stark, Allison sees Tess Fontana, Jo sees the Zane from the previous timeline while Fargo sees a 10-year old girl, who he realizes is his childhood bully. They begin to realize that the visions are here to help them overcome something emotionally holding them back: some are confronted, while others find resolution. Eureka's infrastructure is also collapsing, apparently due to a new DOD project. Grant becomes involved with Beverly's shadowy faction as they attempt to shut down research on the project. Note: Last appearance of Nathan Stark and Tess in the series.
52	9	"I'll Be Seeing You"	Michael Robison	Jaime Paglia	September 10, 2010	2.25
Beverly and the Consortium try to return Grant to 1947 using the powercell from the stolen DED device to power their own space-time bridge forming device. When Carter interrupts the work, he and Grant are trapped in the past. The time line in Eureka may alter again. A power surge from the device puts Allison in peril.
53	10	"O Little Town"	Matt Hastings	Eric Tuchman	December 7, 2010	1.92
This episode was televised as a holiday special. It is set outside the main story. Taggart's "Santaology" technology is sabotaged so that Eureka may shrink to nothing.
54	11	"Liftoff"	Mike Rohl	Story by : Jaime Paglia & Bruce Miller; Teleplay by : Bruce Miller	July 11, 2011	2.02
Efforts are made to rescue Zane and Fargo from space after the accidental launch of what was supposed to be an unmanned mission to test a new FTL drive. An unfortunate shortcut Zane took in his work results in the failure of all of Eureka's electronics, impeding the rescue effort. While in space, Fargo and Zane talk about Jo. Fargo appears before the Technology Appropriations Committee, headed by Senator Wen, one of the Consortium members Beverly has mentioned in the past.
55	12	"Reprise"	Matt Hastings	Amy Berg	July 18, 2011	2.16
A new scientist, Holly Marten, arrives in Eureka. Inadvertently, she infects Eureka's music system with a digital virus, causing Eureka's residents to start acting out their song lyrics. Kevin steals Carter's car; Zane burns down Jo's newly-built house; Fargo conceives an instant hatred for Holly; and, worst of all, Henry and Grace decide to stop time so that they can be together forever. Holly finally reveals that she isn't there to find a pretext to shut down Eureka, but rather that the town is to receive funds for the planning of a voyage to Titan using the new FTL drive. Zane and Jo begin reconnecting, while Beverly covertly returns to Eureka by implanting Allison with a control device.
56	13	"Glimpse"	Michael Robison	Ed Fowler	July 25, 2011	1.77
The Astraeus Mission to Titan launches in 140 days. Scientists compete to be in the crew. Jo and Carter try out contact lenses that predict potential security breaches, as does Fargo, unbeknownst to Zane, their creator. The additional draw on the system's processing power causes it to overheat, putting the town in danger. Jo's uncertain relationship with Zane also begins to overheat as the two work together trying to save the town. The new system flags Allison's behavior as a security risk.
57	14	"Up in the Air"	Alexandra LaRoche	Kira Snyder	August 1, 2011	2.13
The Astraeus Mission is to launch in 115 days. Selection for the Mission continues. Carter must investigate a bank robbery in which the entire bank is literally stolen, leaving only the foundation. Allison begins having memory lapses and her behavior becomes erratic, leaving her frightened.
58	15	"Omega Girls"	Salli Richardson-Whitfield	Eric Wallace & Jaime Paglia	August 8, 2011	2.25
106 Days remaining until the Astraeus Mission Launch. Carter suspects something is wrong with Allison, and he, Zane, and Henry hack her medical records. They discover that someone is controlling her using nano-technology. Beverly is discovered. She puts all the Eureka residents into a coma. However, Zoe and Jo are unaffected. They must stop Beverly from stealing all Eureka's data, and they must do it before Beverly becomes trapped in Allison's body for good.
59	16	"Of Mites and Men"	Mike Rohl	Terri Hughes Burton & Ron Milbauer	August 15, 2011	2.23
The Astraeus Mission launches in 91 days. Machine bugs are trying to destroy GD. These construction mites were created to build and maintain the Astraeus FTL spaceship. Communication experiments in the FTL have caused the bugs to malfunction. They relentlessly pursue their primary function to construct ship parts from tungsten, the main construction component of GD. Mission crew candidates Zane, Fargo, Jo, Holly Marten, and Dr. Parrish are isolated in a cell for psychological stress testing. The bugs might destroy the cell.
60	17	"Clash of the Titans"	Michael Robison	Eric Tuchman & Paula Yoo	August 22, 2011	2.03
The Astraeus Mission launches in 60 days. After exploring Titan, Tiny, the rover returns to GD. When Tiny's compression shield is dropped, the rover explodes. Samples from Titan are scattered over Eureka. The town's atmosphere becomes toxic with methane, ethane, and nitrogen. The Department of Defense auditor is investigating Allison's relationship with Carter.
61	18	"This One Time at Space Camp..."	Andrew Seklir	Amy Berg	August 29, 2011	2.13
At 45 days to the launch of the Astraeus Mission, the candidates undergo final interviews, sharing memories of pivotal moments in their lives with the selection committee. Carter and Allison appeal their relationship audit and are surprised when they're given the same auditor. Strange occurrences at first seem linked to someone trying to sabotage the Astraeus mission, but soon are revealed to have an origin much more rooted in Carter's past. At the end of the episode, the Astraeus crew is announced and Jo reveals that she withdrew her name after her interview, much to Zane's bewilderment.
62	19	"One Small Step"	Michael Robison	Bruce Miller	September 12, 2011	1.93
The Astraeus Mission launch is one week away. The FTL ship's drive at GD accidentally activates, sending Andy to Titan. The team at GD try to save him. A spate of meltings coincides with Taggart's return...and the escape of his genetically engineered brown bats, complicating rescue efforts.
63	20	"One Giant Leap"	Matt Hastings	Jaime Paglia	September 19, 2011	1.87
The Astreaus Mission launches in five hours. Deacon finds a slight power shortage in the ship so the launch countdown must be postponed. The power shortage and a number of power arrays in Eureka have fuelled micro black holes across the town. Carter evacuates Café Diem before it is destroyed. Jo and Carter surround the lake with arrays, thus attracting all the micro black holes to the lake. However, the micro black holes will merge into a larger black hole. Carter, with Deacon's help, eliminates the black hole with antimatter. Allison puts the crew into the stasis pods. Mission control finds that someone has hacked into the network, speeding the timer and redirecting the ship's destination. Allison is trapped inside and the take off will kill her. To abort the launch, Carter breaks the ship's reactor coolant pipes. The reactor is shut down but the ship takes off. Carter had asked Allison to move in with him. Jo decides to leave Eureka.
64	21	"Do You See What I See"	Matt Hastings	Amy Berg & Eric Tuchman	December 6, 2011	1.40
This is a Christmas special set outside the main story. A wave of color crashes over Eureka. The town is changed to an animation of multiple styles and cartoonish effects. Jack's jeep comes alive, Andy is turned into a cartoonish robot, and Jo becomes a princess. The wave of color was caused by a Super Photon Generator, a massive holographic matrix. It was intended to be Jack's Christmas gift to the children. Kevin, Zoey, and Jenna opened a gift early called "Holotown", a "create your own story" book using holograms. The book crossed signals with the Super Photon Generator. The children introduce villainous Snow Ninjas to the cartoon and they merge to form a snow monster. Jack, Andy, Allison, and Jo arrive at the super Photon Generator. They find Dr. Drummer trying to fix the generator. The children realize the connection between the generator and their book. Kevin turns Jack and the others into Anime so they can defeat the snow monster. While Jack and Jo blow up the snow monster with a grenade, Allison, Andy, and Dr. Drummer repair the generator and everyone returns to a normal perspective. At the end of the episode, everyone gathers for a Christmas dinner at the Smart House.

=== Season 5 (2012) ===
On August 17, 2010, Syfy announced that there would be a fifth season. On August 8, 2011, it was announced that season 5 was to be the final season; it was later announced that the network had ordered an additional episode for season 5 to wrap up the series. On February 16, 2012, Syfy announced that the show's fifth and final season would premiere on April 16, 2012. The season concluded on July 16, 2012.

No. overall	No. in series	Title	Directed by	Written by	Original release date	US viewers (millions)
65	1	"Lost"	Matt Hastings	Jaime Paglia	April 16, 2012	1.81
The Astraeus Titan Mission crew return to Earth, but while it seems like moments for them, they discover they have been missing for four years prior, and that Eureka residents had considered them lost. When they return, SARAH is the head of GD, and an army of replica Andys are her security force. Henry is in a self-imposed exile, having taken much of the blame for the loss of the Astraeus, and is no longer mayor, while Jack has raised Allison's children and is, to Allison's horror, now living with Jo. However the Astraeus Crew begin to realize that things are not as harmonious as they seem, and the town residents are essentially prisoners under SARAH's rule. Jack and Allison work to overthrow SARAH and restore the town to its former glory. However, it is revealed that the entire crew has actually been captured by Beverly Barlowe, who now has trapped the crew in a virtual reality simulation.
66	2	"The Real Thing"	Michael Robison	Bruce Miller	April 23, 2012	1.59
One month has passed. The town continues to look for the missing Astraeus crew despite the Department of Defense calling off the search. Kevin needs a part for a scanner he is building in the hope of locating the Astraeus. Carter and Andy go on a mission to find the part but are apprehended. Jo rescues them. Carter realizes that the crew has not been lost in space, but on Earth. Kevin and Henry locate the Astraeus and Carter and Jo lead a rescue team. When they arrive, they find the ship and the simulator. However, Beverly's team and the crew are gone. Jack realizes that the person responsible for the disappearance of the crew is Senator Wen, who is Beverly's superior. Within the simulation, the crew unload biological experiments from Astraeus. They find a nesting dragon. Holly, Allison, and Grace begin to notice that things are not what they seem as there is a malfunction in the computer matrix's central processor. Holly understands they are in a simulation but is killed by Senator Wen through the virtual Carter before she can reveal the truth.
67	3	"Force Quit"	Mike Rohl	Terri Hughes Burton & Ron Milbauer	April 30, 2012	1.47
Fargo leaves Eureka for the airport to find Holly. On the road, he notices a stretch with a "Leaving Eureka" sign repeating, due to a malfunction of the simulation. Zane sees a bird stuck in a rock and goes to help it. Carter's avatar objects, and then starts to malfunction. Beverly returns to Eureka to avenge Holly's death by helping Carter rescue the crew. She plugs Carter into the simulation to replace his avatar just as it's about to kill Zane. Beverly and Carter help the crew destroy the simulation by exploding the virtual Astraeus, the processing power needed to create the explosion overheating the central processor and allows Henry to track the crew. However, the explosion causes the simulation to collapse with the crew inside. Giving Zane an electrical shock ejects him from the simulation. Zane wakes to find a Consortium soldier about to shoot him, but is saved by Jo. Zane ejects everyone but Carter from the simulation, who is logged in from elsewhere. Senator Wen logs Beverly out from the computer system so she cannot save Carter from the simulation, then Senator Wen and a large group of soldiers storm Henry's garage. They attempt to disconnect Carter from the mainframe by force, killing him. Henry produces a stun grenade. Beverly has Zane log her on to the system. She ejects Carter from the simulation. Beverly apprehends Senator Wen and sends her into the simulation, trapping her in a virtual version of the Sheriff's office.
68	4	"Friendly Fire"	Mike Rohl	Amy Berg	May 7, 2012	1.45
Fargo grieves for Holly. He uses an experimental therapy patch to relieve his pain. In a laboratory accident, Parrish's project, the Firefly, is set loose. The Firefly is a ball of energy designed to seek out fires and absorb them. However, it is also a fire hazard. Henry learns of the accident from zeta waves being emitted from individuals who were connected to Senator Wen's neural network. The Astraeus crew are coming to terms with their experiences, but when Allison avoids Jo and makes things awkward, Jack tries to mend fences but finds it difficult to compete against her experiences in a virtual Eureka.
69	5	"Jack of All Trades"	Jaime Paglia	Story by : Jaime Paglia; Teleplay by : Eric Wallace	May 14, 2012	1.49
Zane restarts the computer matrix mainframe that created the virtual Eureka in the hope of recovering some of the corrupted data. The mainframe searches for the members of Senator Wen's neural experiment. It finds Carter, who was connected wirelessly, and causes him to swap bodies with Astraeus crew members around him. Warren Hughes, the Department of Defense relationship auditor, arrives to ensure that the people affected by the neural network are ready to return to work. Carter, in swapping bodies, has to take Fargo and Zane's rehabilitation tests. At GD, machines malfunction due to the presence of the Astraeus crew. Zane finds that the computer matrix has located Holly. Zane tells Fargo that Holly may still be alive within the program. Fargo must make the terrible choice of leaving the machine running and trying to save Holly or shutting it down to stop it from destroying Carter's mind. Carter survives and then proposes to Allison.
70	6	"Worst Case Scenario"	Salli Richardson-Whitfield	Jill Blotevogel	May 21, 2012	1.62
Henry starts a simulation to increase disaster preparedness. The Department of Defense disaster preparedness advisor Dr. Michael Clark, scores the simulation B+. Then, the computer hard drive containing "Advanced Disaster Accuator" (ADA) is destroyed by a liquid nitrogen pipe rupture. GD starts to have malfunctions identical to those in the simulation. The ADA has programmed commands into the GD mainframe in order to make its simulation more authentic and has then destroyed itself so the commands cannot be reversed. Holly's consciousness remains as neural patterns in the mainframe. In order to help Fargo see her again, Zane develops an adaptive waveform force field to hide the matrix. Fargo meets Holly for a few minutes before being called out to supervise the actual disaster. The ADA launches an attack. When the EM shield fails, Zane uses his adaptive waveform force field to save GD. Fargo must tell Holly that she is technically dead. In grief, they hold each other.
71	7	"Ex Machina"	Michael Robison	Kira Snyder	June 4, 2012	1.97
Henry delivers a memorial service for Holly, but Fargo is more interested in seeing her on the Matrix. Major William Shaw from the Department of Defense, arrives at GD to install a new security system called "PANOP". He is to take away the matrix. Zane, Fargo, Carter, Henry, and Allison try to save Holly without alerting Shaw of her presence. However, Holly manipulates PANOP and a system wide error causes Shaw to activate a "Level 6 Polymorphic Antivirus Purge" which would delete Holly forever. Holly uses a laser in GD to write a message. Henry reconstructs the interface and downloads Holly into SARAH's computer. PANOP is disabled but Shaw takes the photonic computer.
72	8	"In Too Deep"	Colin Ferguson	Terri Hughes Burton & Ron Milbaugher	June 11, 2012	1.45
Jo tries to keep "Feynman Day" pranks under control. Allison and Carter argue, but when trapped in a leaky submarine at the bottom of a lake, they ask Henry to marry them before they are teleported to GD. Holly's programming is too much for SARAH's computer to handle and Holly starts to fade away. Zane is put in charge of Section 5. He works to build a computer large enough to save Holly's programming.
73	9	"Smarter Carter"	Alexandra LaRoche	Paula Yoo & Ed Fowler	June 18, 2012	1.59
Allison's genius older brother thinks she has married down as Carter is not her intellectual equal. Carter's intelligence begins to grow but he is losing himself. Allison must find out why and save him.
74	10	"The Honeymooners"	Joe Morton	Eric Tuchman	June 25, 2012	1.61
Carter takes Allison on a romantic honeymoon that is not to her taste at the former sheriff's forest cabin. There, he finds a file hidden in a safe which he gives to Andy. Andy and Jo learn that the former sheriff was investigating a spy network in Eureka and Grace is a former spy. However, Grace is protecting Henry as it was Henry's former timeline self who introduced Grace to Beverly. Holly's mind is downloaded into her bio-printed body but she encounters technical difficulties which could threaten her existence. Zane reinitiates Holly's neural pathways and saves her. Carter and Allison reach a compromise over their honeymoon.
75	11	"Mirror, Mirror"	Mike Rohl	Bruce Miller	July 2, 2012	1.59
Shaw arrives to investigate the old spy network and apprehend Grace. An experiment with a cloud of smart-dust disrupts communications in Eureka and threatens human brain functions. Holly receives a mysterious message. It changes in her behavior, and she uses it to change Andy's. Henry wants to surrender to Shaw but Grace convinces him not to. Jo tries to sabotage Shaw's investigation to help Henry. Allison discovers Holly using the body-printer. Holly is using the printer to create clones that will replace the residents of Eureka. Zane finds the message and shows it to Allison. Carter and Allison see that Andy and Henry are behaving oddly. Jo remembers she has seen the message before, when Holly was trapped in the GD computer. Jo is lured into the forest where she is attacked by a copy of herself. Zane is arrested for tampering with the evidence files. Holly knocks Henry, Jo, and Carter unconscious as they have seen what she is doing.
76	12	"Double Take"	Matt Hastings	Margaret Dunlap, Nina Fiore & John Herrera	July 9, 2012	1.50
The Matrix program, having corrupted Holly and Andy, implants the NPC personalities of Jo, Carter, and Henry into body-printed duplicates. The "evil clones" work to recapture the Astraeus crew. Allison, Fargo, and Zane notice the evil clones and work with Parrish to stop them. Zane and Parrish build a z wave amplifier bomb. The clones follow the team members to the cabin where Allison detonates the bomb. Holly and the evil clones are disabled and kept in storage. Holly wakes two weeks later. She has forgotten everything since arriving in Eureka.
77	13	"Just Another Day"	Matt Hastings	Story by : Bruce Miller & Jaime Paglia; Teleplay by : Jaime Paglia	July 16, 2012	1.56
When the Department of Defense shuts down Eureka the town is threatened by unstable wormholes. Zoe visits Eureka before her graduation. Henry tries to save Grace, going as far as to ask Beverly to help her. Dr. Taggart tries to catch his super-smart dog. Holly deals with her loss of memory, and restarts her relationship with Fargo. Carter puts on one of Fargo's devices to stop the wormholes. The Secretary of Defense calls Fargo to tell him they've sold Eureka. Grace returns when anonymous information about Senator Wen is given to federal authorities in exchange for Grace's freedom. Jo asks Zane to marry her and he accepts. Grant returns as Dr. Rockwell. He has purchased Eureka. He will keep the town running if Henry becomes director. Henry agrees. Allison tells Carter that she is pregnant. When Jack takes Zoe back to college, they pass themselves five years in the past as they first come to Eureka, mirroring a similar scene in the pilot.

== Webisodes ==
=== Hide and Seek (2006) ===
No.	Title	Original release date
1	"Prologue"	July 25, 2006
In the woods, a group of teenagers sneak up to Jo's house with a camera, hoping to catch a free show. As they watch, a mysterious creature attacks them.
2	"Part One"	July 25, 2006
The video of the teenagers being attacked is now on the Internet, and Zoe has linked it to her homepage in an attempt to get some answers. Jack believes it is a drunk in a monkey suit, but a visit from Allison confirms it is real. Taggart is happy to have found something after so many years.
3	"Part Two"	August 1, 2006
In the woods, Jo and Carter search for the creature. Stark tells Carter the information about the creature is classified. Jo and Carter find a gutted bear, and bag a claw they find in its stomach. Taggart and Fargo hunt the creature. Fargo is chased away.
4	"Part Three"	August 8, 2006
The creature knocks out Taggart. As Allison and Jack change a flat tire, the creature attacks them. A gunshot sounds and the screen goes dark.
5	"Part Four"	August 15, 2006
Taggart survives the creature's attack. He finds Fargo's broken glasses, and assumes he is dead. Allison has shot the creature and has it in a body bag at Henry's garage. A team from GD will collect it. Henry explains that the creature has Neanderthal DNA. The claw does not belong to the creature in the bag. There is a loud roar in the woods.
6	"Part Five"	August 22, 2006
Fargo, tired and bruised, stumbles into the Sheriff's office. He says the creature is the "Missing Link" and he finds the creature that Allison shot, which is now at GD, is not the one that attacked him. Carter asks Stark about the creature. Stark says Taggart knows more since it was his project that created the creature and so Carter and Fargo leave to find him. As they leave, Stark says Taggart is one "stupid brilliant son of a bitch." In the woods, Jack and Fargo hear the creature roar as it closes on them.
7	"Part Six"	August 29, 2006
Jack and Fargo find Taggart, who is injured and incoherent. Taggart says his funding was stopped just as was on the verge of a breakthrough. Taggart says it was too early for human trials. Then, Taggart roars.
8	"Part Seven"	September 5, 2006
Taggart, now a creature, prepares to attack Carter. As Fargo makes a distraction, Carter shoots Taggart. At GD, Taggart appears human but is behaving like the creature. Fargo says he is now on gene therapy, and will be normal in a few weeks. Stark still will not explain what has happened. The team assume the threat is resolved but another creature is seen outside Jo's house.
