= Amy Berg =

Amy Berg may refer to:

- Amy Berg (writer), American television writer and showrunner
- Amy J. Berg (born 1970), American filmmaker
