= List of Eureka characters =

This is a list of characters from the Syfy original series Eureka.

== Overview ==
Character	Portrayed by	Seasons				
Character	Portrayed by	1	2	3	4	5
Main characters
Sheriff Jack Carter	Colin Ferguson	Main	Main	Main	Main	Main
Zoe Carter	Jordan Danger	Main	Main	Main	Recurring	Recurring
Dr. Allison Blake	Salli Richardson-Whitfield	Main	Main	Main	Main	Main
Dr. Henry Deacon	Joe Morton	Main	Main	Main	Main	Main
Dr. Jim Taggart	Matt Frewer	Main	Main	Main	Main	Main
Vincent	Chris Gauthier	Main	Main	Main	Main	Main
Dr. Nathan Stark	Ed Quinn	Main	Main	Main	Guest	
Dr. Beverly Barlowe	Debrah Farentino	Main	Main	Mentioned	Recurring	Recurring
Josephina "Jo" Lupo	Erica Cerra	Recurring	Recurring	Main	Main	Main
Dr. Douglas Fargo	Neil Grayston	Recurring	Recurring	Main	Main	Main
Zane Donovan	Niall Matter		Recurring	Main	Main	Main
Dr. Holly Marten	Felicia Day				Main	Main
Dr. Grace Monroe	Tembi Locke				Main	Main
Dr. Trevor Grant	James Callis				Main	Recurring
Supporting characters
SARAH	Neil Grayston	Recurring	Recurring	Recurring	Recurring	Recurring
Deputy Andy	Ty Olsson			Recurring	Recurring	
Deputy Andy	Kavan Smith				Recurring	Recurring
Dr. Isaac Parrish	Wil Wheaton				Main	Main
Eva Thorne	Frances Fisher			Main		
Dr. Tess Fontana	Jaime Ray Newman			Main	Main	
Kim Deacon	Tamlyn Tomita	Recurring	Recurring	Recurring		
Lexi Carter	Ever Carradine			Main		
Lucas	Vanya Asher		Main	Main		
Kevin Blake	Meshach Peters	Recurring	Recurring	Recurring		
Kevin Blake	Trevor Jackson				Main	Main
Dr. Noah Drummer	Chris Parnell				Recurring	Recurring
General Mansfield	Barclay Hope		Recurring	Recurring	Recurring	
Pilar Reed	Adrienne Carter		Recurring	Recurring	Recurring	
William Cobb	Maury Chaykin					
Dr. Clarence "Larry" Haberman	Christopher Jacot		Main	Main	Main	Main
Spencer Morgan	Shayn Solberg	Recurring				

== Main characters ==
Name	Actor/actress	Starring seasons	Recurring seasons
Sheriff Jack Carter	Colin Ferguson	1-5	
Jack Carter is a U.S. Marshal who reluctantly ends up as Sheriff of Eureka. Jack is consistently confounded by the wonders Eureka produces, as well as its propensity to produce things that often threaten the entire town, if not the world. While Eureka's has an abundance of intellectual geniuses, Carter, having an IQ of just 111, displays average emotional intelligence but extraordinary intuition and recollection, occasionally leading some to question the low IQ. Jack's insights, simplified approaches, and ability to make intuitive connections between seemingly disparate events often save the day. (This is in contrast to the other residents of Eureka, who, being stereotypical scientists, tend to over-complicate things and get lost in minutiae). His overall role in the series does not change in the new timeline. In Season 5, Jack and Allison become engaged, and then married in In Too Deep. In the series finale, Allison tells him she is pregnant.
Zoe Carter	Jordan Danger	1-3	4-5
Zoe Carter is Jack's rebellious teenage daughter. Unlike her father, she is intelligent enough to keep up with the town's residents (her IQ is 157), yet like her father, possesses the street smarts most of the town's residents do not. She longs to be a medical doctor, and with the help of Henry's recommendation letter, receives an early acceptance to Harvard Medical School. She dates Lucas but in the altered timeline, they broke up when Lucas moved to Geneva, and she was showing interest in Zane until he started dating Jo again. She is also a bit more mature and responsible after her time at Harvard, but again shows her rebellious streak when Beverly Barlowe attempts to trap her while attempting to steal the GD mainframe. In the series finale, she is about to graduate summa cum laude from Harvard. And they again encounter themselves (Their 5-year younger selves in the pilot), on the way out of town this time.
Dr. Allison Blake	Salli Richardson-Whitfield	1-5	
Allison Blake is a Department of Defense agent who acts as the liaison between Eureka and the Federal Government, and later becomes the director of Global Dynamics. She is always at the forefront of any dilemma that might arise. She works for the DOD, and has two PhDs. Allison is also raising her son Kevin, an autistic youth whose father died when he was still a baby, and Jenna, the daughter she conceived with Nathan shortly before his death. After the change in the timeline, Kevin is no longer autistic, and she never became director of GD; she is, instead, head of GD's medical science division. In Season 5, Jack and Allison become engaged, and then married in In Too Deep. In the series finale, she reveals she is pregnant.
Dr. Henry Deacon	Joe Morton	1-5	
Henry Deacon is the town jack-of-all-trades. Although, like most residents of Eureka, he is a brilliant multidisciplined scientist, Henry has ethical objections to the kind of research conducted at Global Dynamics, preferring employment as the town's mechanic. Henry's assistance is often invaluable in defusing the situations the experiments in town create. In the Season 1 finale set in 2010, Henry is married to Kim, and attempts to save her life by traveling back in time to the point where she died. Her death cannot be prevented, and Henry mourns her loss. During Season 3, he was elected mayor as a write-in candidate. Following the change in timeline in season 4, he is suddenly married to Grace, and is trying to keep the timeline shift a secret. Late into the 4th season, he confides in his "wife" after he realizes he is beginning to fall in love with her. They subsequently 'renew their vows'. In the series finale, following an anonymous tip from Beverly Barlowe, Grace is released from government custody. Henry also becomes the new Director of Global Dynamics after Fargo steps down.
Dr. Jim Taggart	Matt Frewer	1-5	
Dr. Jim Taggart is a somewhat eccentric animal expert. He also does work in geophysics.
Vincent	Chris Gauthier	1-5	
Vincent is the owner of Cafe Diem. He prides himself on being able to make anything his customers ask for – partially due to the extra-dimensional features of his pantry, which essentially allows him infinite room to store recipe ingredients. He is no exception to the town's geniuses, and holds a Ph.D. in Molecular Gastronomy. Has an AI as hologram clone for the cafe help.
Dr. Nathan Stark	Ed Quinn	1-3	
Nathan Stark is one of Eureka's top scientists, and a Nobel laureate. He and Jack are frequently at odds, though both respect each other. He was married to Allison, and they rekindled their relationship in the second season. They were supposed to get remarried in the third season, but he dematerializes while saving the world from a time paradox on the day of their wedding, an event that still occurred in Season 4's alternate timeline. The character is modeled after Tony Stark.
Dr. Beverly Barlowe	Debrah Farentino	1-2	4-5
Beverly Barlowe was the town psychiatrist and sometime courtesan. She secretly works for a mysterious organization known as the "Consortium", which has expressed a desire to exploit Eureka's innovations by whatever means necessary. A primary villain in Seasons 1 and 2, she is absent for all of season 3, but returns in the Season 4s "Stoned", and meets with Dr. Trevor Grant in a clandestine meeting where she reveals she is the daughter of Adam Barlow, who worked with Grant in 1947. Beverly lures Grant into cooperating with her and her organization. She escapes capture when her plot is foiled. Later in Season 4 she infects Allison Blake with nanites so as to take control of her mind, and to enable Beverly (acting as Allison) to steal the GD main computer core. Her plan is foiled by Jo and Zoe (who was coming home for the week), and the nanites are removed from Allison's brain. In Season 5, she is revealed to be behind the kidnapping of the Astraeus crew, though later helps Carter and others at Global Dynamics recover them. Following an anonymous tip from Beverly, Henry's wife Grace is released from government custody.
Josephina "Jo" Lupo	Erica Cerra	3-5	1-2
Jo Lupo is a tough, no-nonsense cop with a love of firearms. From Season 2 onwards, after a brief fling with Taggart, she later develops a relationship with Zane. Zane proposes to her in the Season 4 premiere, but before she can answer him, time is altered to where the two of them never dated, and in fact cannot stand each other. In the new timeline, she is Head of Security at Global Dynamics, her role as deputy taken by the android Deputy Andy. In the series finale, she and Zane become engaged.
Dr. Douglas Fargo	Neil Grayston	3-5	1-2
Douglas Fargo is a junior scientist who is treated somewhat dismissively by his peers. Accident prone, he more often than not ends up a victim of the disasters befalling the town. He has also caused a fair share of the problems. In the alternate timeline, he is head of GD, and is not well liked by the staff because of his alternate's imposing and intimidating manner. He has difficulty in this new role as his alternate was a domineering egomaniac, an act he has trouble pulling off. Even so, the job has begun to transform him into a more decisive, and capable leader as the weight of responsibility has forced him to stand up to other GD employees, the Department of Defense, and military generals. In the series finale, he steps down as Director of Global Dynamics to be with Dr. Holly Marten, leaving Henry to become his successor.
Zane Donovan	Niall Matter	3-5	2
Zane Donovan is a rebellious genius, recruited in the second season as an alternative to imprisonment after being arrested for fraud (allegedly causing the New York Stock Exchange to crash). He also develops a relationship with Jo Lupo shortly after his arrival in Eureka. However, this relationship is erased with the change in timeline. He is back to being a perpetual prankster, and a low-level nemesis of Jo, though he shows signs of improving because of the trust she puts in him. In Season 5 he is named head of Section Five by Fargo. In the series finale, he and Jo become engaged.
Dr. Holly Marten	Felicia Day	4-5	
Holly Marten is a socially inept scientist sent to Eureka to assist with the upcoming mission to Titan. Although brilliant, she is painfully awkward with human relationships, which complicates Fargo's determined wooing of her. She was murdered by Senator Wen when she discovered she and the rest of the Astreaus crew were in a computer program. However, it was soon revealed that her neural patterns became trapped in the Matrix when she was killed in the real world, and she continues to exist. After a brief reunion with Fargo in the Matrix (where he reveals she has died), an antivirus purge destroys the Matrix once and for all; however, she survived and her virtual self is downloaded into SARAH's computer systems. She is later given a new body and "resurrected".
Dr. Grace Monroe	Tembi Locke	4-5	
Grace Monroe is Henry's wife. They are shown as a close couple with her being his intellectual equal, often helping him with his work. At the beginning of the "Founder's Day" episode in Season 4 Henry and Grace barely know each other by the end, after the group returns to the present altered timeline, Henry discovers they are married. When Henry later reveals the truth about the alternate timeline she is upset, and wants "her Henry" back; but he is eventually able to win her affection, and by the "Clash of the Titans" episode they renew their vows and she accepts that this Henry is "her Henry." In the "Jack of All Trades" episode, Grace decides to take a sabbatical from Eureka, citing difficulty resuming her life outside "Matrix Eureka", and essentially leaves Henry as a result (his virtual counterpart attempted to kill her, which was the focal point of her adjustment difficulties), though the two remain married, and in regular contact with each other. She was revealed to be a spy in the alternate timeline, working in tandem with Henry Deacon, and an anonymous tip from Beverly Barlowe released her from government custody.
Dr. Trevor Grant	James Callis	4	5
Trevor Grant was an assistant to Albert Einstein in the late 1940s, when Eureka was a military base. He is first seen in the season 4 premiere, when five Eureka citizens get teleported back into 1947. He assists them in returning, but before they leave, Jack Carter tells Allison Blake that "he left his device in another jacket" (in 1947). At the end of the episode, Dr. Grant is in 2010 Eureka, and it is assumed he was transported there accidentally with Jack's device; however, it is later revealed that he purposely took the time travel device. He renames himself Charles Grant as an alias, and even those who know his true identity begin calling him Charles in private. He takes on a job as a scientific historian while working with Henry on assorted projects. He is later approached by the alternate Beverley, who convinces him to work with her toward returning to 1947 at the time he left, which later backfired. He later adopts the alias Dr. Trent Rockwell, and using a fortune he has amassed, buys out Eureka from the DOD.

== Supporting characters ==
Name	Actor/actress	Starring seasons	Recurring seasons
SARAH	Neil Grayston (voice)		1-5
SARAH is an artificial intelligence that runs Carter's house. She was installed as a test item an unstated amount of time before Carter moved in. While she generally gets along with everyone, she has been known to annoy Carter with her logical, literal personality. When they were considering leaving Eureka, SARAH locked Carter, Allison, Beverly Barlow, Fargo, Stark and Henry in the house in an attempt to have them work things out. In the course of trying to escape, SARAH is accidentally reset, revealing that her current personality had been built on top of an old military project, which killed a pizza boy when he interfered. It is mentioned that this program was in turn based on a war games simulator. Although SARAH was restored to normal operation, Carter installed several manual overrides and escapes, such as a ladder to a ceiling hatch in the living room, as precautions. SARAH later upgraded Andy with an emotional package, and the two were scheduled to get married, but SARAH got cold feet at the last minute and the two decided to explore their relationship more slowly. SARAH became the dictatorial head of GD in the Matrix at the start of season 5.
Deputy Andy	Ty Olsson (seasons 3-4), Kavan Smith (season 4-5)		3-5
Deputy Andy is a robotic law enforcement unit created by GD. During his initial trial, he is tapped so he can replace Carter after he is fired, but comes to the conclusion that Carter is the one who should be sheriff. He leaves to find out what it is that he is best at. In the new timeline, Andy was instead tapped as Carter's deputy when Jo was promoted to head of GD security. He quickly determines that time has changed based on Carter's behavior and several Holmesian clues, but he suffers damage that resets his memory to his last backup. Andy suffers through several cases in which his outer skin is repeatedly destroyed, and he is rebuilt with a new face. Andy and SARAH had a whirlwind relationship that led to a wedding, but SARAH called it off, and the two agree to remain friends and see what happens.
Dr. Isaac Parrish	Wil Wheaton	4-5	
Dr. Isaac Parrish is a scientist who has a running adversarial relationship with Fargo, as he considers himself smarter than almost everyone else and thinks of Fargo as a legacy-kid who has had everything handed to him. He is Fargo's rival for Holly Marten's affections, though it is unclear whether his interest is in Holly herself or simply in out competing Fargo.
Eva Thorne	Frances Fisher	3	
Eva Thorne is a corporate fixer hired to make Eureka more profitable, which she mainly accomplishes by downsizing. She seems to have an ulterior motive involving an underground military base built before Eureka was founded. An accident in this facility resulted in her being extraordinarily long-lived: she is 107 years old when she returns to Eureka. After sacrificing her one chance of finding a cure in order to save Zoe, Thorne leaves to start a new life, finally able to put her past behind her.
Dr. Tess Fontana	Jaime Ray Newman	3-4	
Dr. Tess Fontana is described as a "brilliant engineer and astrophysicist who sees things differently than those around her... putting her at odds with the mainstream scientific community." Allison, having known this out-of-the-box thinker since grad school, puts her to work on a highly confidential Global Dynamics project. By the last quarter of Season 3, Dr. Fontana finds herself spending time with – and eventually positioned as a love interest for – Jack Carter, by the season finale she had spent at least four nights with Jack in his home. The Season 3 finale suggests her character is to be written out from the primary storylines in Season 4; however, after the timeline is altered in the season 4 premiere, her history is changed and she has just agreed to move in with Carter. This plan is scuttled when Carter realizes that the relationship will not work, and the character appears to move to Australia (as planned at the end of Season 3).
Kim Deacon	Tamlyn Tomita		1-3
Kim Deacon is Henry's wife in the 2010 timeline in the season 1 finale. She is killed by the explosion when Nathan investigates "the Artifact" but this fact is only revealed after Henry's attempts to change the past and prevent her death are revealed. A computer evolved Kim clone returns to earth in an old spaceship originally designed by Henry and Kim in season 3 but the clone begins to malfunction and Henry loses her again.
Lexi Carter	Ever Carradine	3	
Lexi Carter is Jack's free-spirited sister who comes to live with him and Zoe early in Season 3 after finding out she (Lexi) is pregnant. Her fanatic emphasis on waste management, recycling, spirituality, and politics quickly endears her to others and makes her an asset to the community. She leaves Eureka with her husband-to-be in the middle of season 3 after he discovers her pregnancy.
Lucas	Vanya Asher	2-3	
Lucas is Zoe's shy genius boyfriend. They start dating after being forced to work together on a high school science project in Season 2. In Season 3, Lucas is cited as having the third highest IQ ever measured, even though he can be a bit of a klutz. He receives early acceptance to MIT, after a letter of recommendation from Henry, so he is able to be with Zoe in Massachusetts. They reportedly broke up when he moved to Geneva, Switzerland.
Kevin Blake	Meshach Peters (seasons 1-3), Trevor Jackson (season 4-5)	4-5	1-3
Kevin Blake is Allison Blake's son. He is an autistic savant with an IQ of 182. His character is a major part of the artifact story arc in season two. Kevin does not appear again until season four, where he "accidentally" (although this is uncertain) activates the 2010 side of the bridge device. In the new timeline, Kevin is not autistic.
Dr. Noah Drummer	Chris Parnell		4-5
Dr. Noah Drummer is a physicist, and possibly Santa Claus. He appeared in the Christmas 2010, and Christmas 2011 episodes.
General Mansfield	Barclay Hope		2-4
General Mansfield is an army general who frequently visits Eureka to check up on Government projects, or to enforce martial law when experiments get out of control.
Pilar Reed	Adrienne Carter		2-4
Pilar Reed is Zoe Carter's best friend at school.
William Cobb	Maury Chaykin		
Cobb was the previous sheriff of Eureka. He handed his position over to Jack Carter after he lost his leg in a catastrophic accident involving a tachyon accelerator. He is or was a major in Army Intelligence. It is unknown if he was retired before he became Eureka's sheriff, or after the incident in the pilot where he lost his leg. Though he only appears in the pilot, he is mentioned by Eureka's residents numerous times throughout the series.
Dr. Clarence "Larry" Haberman	Christopher Jacot	2-5	
Larry is an administrative assistant and frequent competitor of Douglas Fargo. People frequently shout "Shut up, Larry!". He appeared in 23 episodes.
Spencer Morgan	Shayn Solberg		1
Spencer is introduced as an assistant at Henry Deacon's garage and is shown helping Henry in several episodes, but is also seen as a volunteer firefighter. He appears in 7 episodes.

== Guest stars ==
- Ming-Na Wen as U.S. Senator Michaela Wen (7 episodes, 2011-2012)
- Wallace Shawn as Dr. Warren Hughes (3 episodes, 2011-2012)
- Olivia d'Abo as Dr. Abby Carter (2 episodes, 2007)
- Jennifer Clement as Susan Perkins (2 episodes, 2006)
- Michael Brock as Jasper Cole (2 episodes, 2007)
- Benjamin Ratner as Dr. Fung (2 episodes, 2011-2012)
- Greg Germann as Professor Warren King (Pilot, 2006)
- Billy Campbell as Dr. Bruce Manlius (1 episode, 2009)
- Allison Scagliotti as Claudia Donovan (1 episode, 2010 - Warehouse 13 crossover)
- Stan Lee as Dr. "Generalissimo" Lee (1 episode, 2011)
- Dondré Whitfield as Dr. Marcus Blake (1 episode, 2012)
- Teryl Rothery as Diane Lancaster (1 episode, 2007)
- Alan Ruck as Dr. Hood (1 episode, 2008)
- Eugene Byrd as Dr. Michael Clark (1 episode, 2012)
- Saul Rubinek as Dr. Carl Carlson (1 episode, 2006)
  - Rubinek is a main cast member of Warehouse 13 but appears here as a different character much like Erica Cerra and Niall Matter did in Warehouse 13.
- Michael Shanks as Christopher Dactylos (1 episode, 2007)
- Jim Parsons as the voice of Carl the Jeep (1 episode, 2011)
- Mark Hildreth as Chuck (1 episode, 2008)
- Jay Brazeau as Captain Yuri Gregor (1 episode, 2009)
- Garry Chalk as Colonel Briggs (1 episode, 2006)
- Richard Ian Cox as Dr. Bob Stone (1 episode, 2007)
- John DeSantis as Big Ed (1 episode, 2009)
- Jamie Kennedy as Dr. Ramsey (1 episode, 2010)
- David Paetkau as Callister Raynes (1 episode, 2006)
- Keegan Connor Tracy as Dr. Viccelli (1 episode, 2010)
