= Ed Quinn =

American actor, model and musician (born 1968)

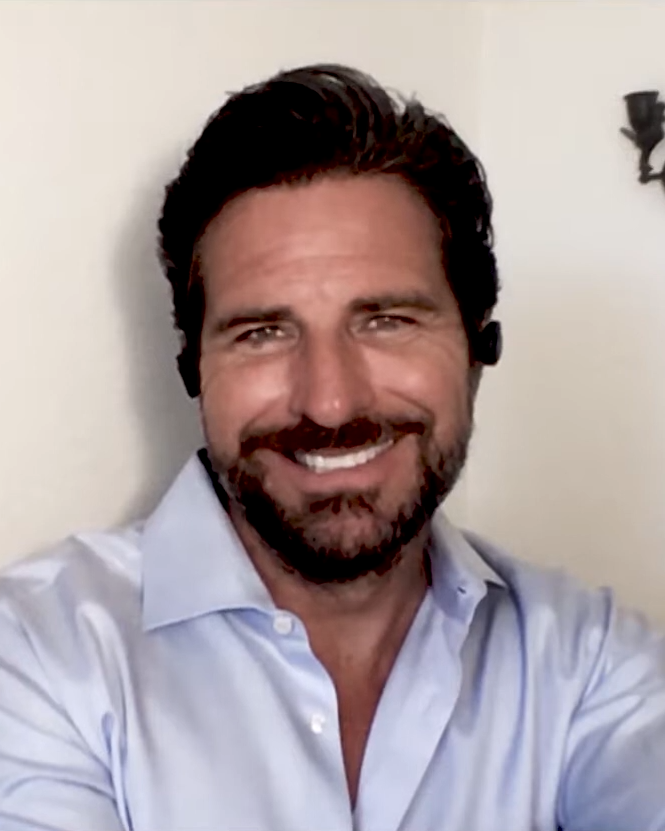
- Quinn in 2020
- Born: Arthur Edward Quinn; February 26, 1968 (age 58); Berkeley, California, U.S.
- Education: University of California, Berkeley (BA)
- Occupation: Actor
- Years active: 1999–present
- Spouse: Heather Courtney Quinn (m. 2008)

Arthur Edward Quinn (born February 26, 1968) is an American actor, model and musician. He played recurring roles in a number of television series, including 2 Broke Girls, Mistresses, and One Day at a Time. From 2006 to 2010 he starred in the Syfy fantasy series Eureka, and in 2019 began starring as President Hunter Franklin in the BET prime time soap opera The Oval.

== Early life and education ==
Quinn was born in Berkeley, California, where he attended St. Mary's College High School and went on to earn a bachelor's degree in history from the University of California, Berkeley in 1991. While in Berkeley, Quinn was a brother of Alpha Delta Phi (California Chapter). He also played rugby for California.

== Career ==
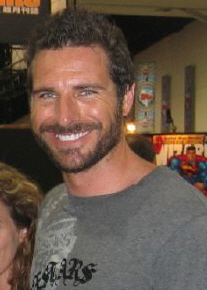
Quinn in 2007

After graduating, Quinn worked as a model in Paris, Barcelona, and Milan, landing parts in more than 35 international television commercials. When he returned to the United States, Quinn landed the starring role of Finn in The WB summer series Young Americans (2000). Later he had a recurring roles on Jack & Jill and CSI: NY. He made his film debut in the 2002 low-budget film Beeper starring Harvey Keitel and later appeared in direct-to-video Starship Troopers 2: Hero of the Federation (2004). From 2006 through 2008, he played Nathan Stark in the Syfy series Eureka, reprising this role once during 2010.

In 2015 Quinn joined the cast of the ABC series Mistresses. From 2016 to 2017, Quinn had a recurring role in last two seasons of CBS sitcom 2 Broke Girls. In 2018, Quinn had a recurring role in the Netflix series One Day at a Time. Quinn's role as Max Ferraro on One Day at a Time continued as the show transitioned to Pop (also shown on TV Land and Logo) for the fourth season in 2020. In 2019, Quinn landed the starring role of fictitious President Hunter Franklin in the Tyler Perry prime time soap opera The Oval.

=== Music ===
Quinn studied with Joe Satriani and played in the Los Angeles-based bands Mad Theory and Scattergood, which led to a recording contract. He handled lead/rhythm guitar and vocals for the band ScatterGood, which has taken a hiatus. Quinn recently did his first solo demo CD, entitled Quinn, with three songs produced by his friend Chris Lloyd: "Because of You", "Cause I Do" and "We Had It Made". Another 5 song EP was released in 2013.

== Personal life ==
Quinn and Heather Courtney-Quinn, a TV and film producer, have been married since 2008.

== Filmography ==
=== Film ===
Year	Title	Role	Notes
2002	Beeper	Dr. Richard Avery	
2004	Starship Troopers 2: Hero of the Federation	Cpl. Joe Griff	
2005	House of the Dead 2	Lt. Steven Ellis	
2006	Hooked	Ed	Short film
2007	The Neighbor	Jonathan	
2008	The Rainbow Tribe	Sunny	
2011	The Caller	Steven Campbell	
2011	Blood Out	Anthony	
2011	Low Fidelity	Bob	
2012	Werewolf: The Beast Among Us	Charles	Direct-to-video
2014	Audrey	Pete	
2014	The Last Light	Jack Lewis	
2015	Navy Seals vs. Zombies	Lt. Pete Cunningham	
2018	Hero	James Renn	Short film
2019	Grand-Daddy Day Care	Jack Quartermaine	Direct-to-video
2019	The Last Summer	Griffin's Dad	
2020	American Pie Presents: Girls' Rules	Kevin	Direct-to-video
2024	Guns & Moses	Detective Wallace	
2025	Shadow Force	Parker	

=== Television ===
Year	Title	Role	Notes
1999	V.I.P.	Jeff	Episode: "Why 2 Kay"
2000	Dharma & Greg	Stavros	Episode: "The Best Laid Plans"
2000	Young Americans	Finn	Main cast; 8 episodes
2001	Jack & Jill	Peter McCray	6 episodes
2001–2002	Crossing Jordan	Tyler	2 episodes
2003	Life with Bonnie	Rock Benson	Episode: "Queer Eye for the Straight Lie"
2004	It's All Relative	Brad	Episode: "Cross My Heart"
2004	According to Jim	Doug	Episode: "Everyone Gets Dumped"
2004	JAG	Simon Tanveer	Episode: "Hail and Farewell (Part II)"
2004	CSI: Crime Scene Investigation	Tom Cunningham	Episode: "Swap Meet"
2005	Jake in Progress	Dakota	Episode: "Stand by Your Man"
2005	What I Like About You	Jack	Episode: "Bad to the Scone"
2005–2006	CSI: NY	Frankie Mala	4 episodes
2006–2010	Eureka	Nathan Stark	Main cast: seasons 1–3; recurring: season 4; 30 episodes
2009	True Blood	Stan Baker	3 episodes
2009	The Beautiful Life	Richard Foster	2 episodes
2010	Desperate Housewives	Brent Ferguson	Episode: "Down the Block There's a Riot"
2011	Behemoth	Thomas Walsh	Television film
2011	NCIS: Los Angeles	Steve Brenner/Justin Marchetti	Episode: "Empty Quiver"
2012	Castle	Gabriel Winters	Episode: "The Final Frontier"
2012	12 Disasters of Christmas	Joseph	Television film
2014	The Exes	Matt	Episode: "When Haskell Met Sammy"
2014	Bad Judge	Chad Forbes	Episode: "One Brave Waitress"
2015	Revenge	James Allen	6 episodes
2015	Mistresses	Dr. Alec Adams	10 episodes
2015	Faking It	Hank	3 episodes
2016–2017	2 Broke Girls	Randy	17 episodes
2017	NCIS: New Orleans	Ethan McKinley	Episode: "Slay the Dragon"
2018–2020	One Day at a Time	Max Ferraro	Recurring role; 11 episodes
2019–present	The Oval	President Hunter Franklin	Main role
2026	Scrubs	Dr. Jax West	3 episodes
