= Jordan Danger =

American actress (born 1991)

Jordan Hinson (born Jordan Danielle Hinson, June 4, 1991) is an American actress, writer and director. She is best known for her role as Zoe Carter on the science fiction series Eureka.
