= Behemoth (2011 film) =

2011 American horror film

- DVD cover
- Written by: Rachelle S. Howie
- Directed by: W. D. Hogan
- Starring: Ed Quinn; Pascale Hutton; William B. Davis
- Music by: Michael Neilson
- Countries of origin: United States; Canada
- Original language: English

Production
- Executive producers: Tom Berry; Lisa M. Hansen
- Producer: John Prince
- Cinematography: Anthony Metchie
- Editor: Christopher A. Smith
- Running time: 90 minutes
- Production companies: CineTel Films; Goliath Pictures; RHI Entertainment; Reel One Entertainment

Original release
- Network: Syfy
- Release: January 15, 2011

Behemoth is a 2011 American film. It is the twenty-third film in the Maneater film series. It was premiered January 15, 2011, on Syfy.

== Plot ==
Two military agents are taking readings on Mount Lincoln near the town of Ascension. There is a quake and the woman, Agent O'Neil, dies with marks on her face. The man, Agent McKewan, also dies after being crushed. Elsewhere, a man is injured in a work crew and dies for no apparent reason. It later appears the quakes on the mountain are producing a layer of carbon dioxide gas, suffocating those who descend to its altitude. A woman named Emily, studying Mt. Lincoln, visits the mountain to repair two machines.

In the adjacent town, an old man named William is considered an eccentric for believing that the mountain contains Behemoth. Emily meets with William's son and her old friend, Thomas. Satellite images show movement under the mountain, which they attribute to volcanism. Thomas's sister Grace and her boyfriend ascend the mountain, and Thomas is persuaded to go as guide to government agent Jack Murray. They meet Emily, who is running because part of a mountain suddenly exploded; whereas Grace and her boyfriend are startled by a monstrous eye and accompanying tentacle.

After she and Thomas have discovered Agent O'Neil's body, Emily has persuaded the Sheriff to evacuate the town, but Thomas and Emily ascend the mountain to look for the missing couple. They find Jack injured on the mountain, and Behemoth kills Jack immediately after revelation that the troubles at Mt. Lincoln were felt all over the world six months ago, and a missing box may be their only chance against Behemoth (lost when the agents were killed). William goes to the local diner to get the waitress, Zoe, to safety.

However, an earthquake damages the town, and the diner sinks into the ground with William and Zoe still inside. The box is recovered; but the monster consumes the boyfriend, while Thomas pulls Grace to safety. Behemoth then emerges from the mountain, whereupon Thomas opens the box and fires a shoulder-launched missile into Behemoth's throat, destroying it. William and Zoe escape from the diner in a sinkhole, and all five survivors are reunited.

== Cast ==
- Ed Quinn as Thomas Walsh
- Pascale Hutton as Emily Allington
- Cindy Busby as Grace Walsh
- Ty Olsson as Jack Murray
- Jessica Parker Kennedy as Zoe
- William B. Davis as William Walsh
- Garry Chalk as Sheriff Matt Allington
- James Kirk as Jerrod Dietrich
- Shaw Madson as Agent McKewan
- Marsha Regis as Agent O'Neil
- Michael Adamthwaite as Joe
- Nicholas Ouellette as Mansey
- John Hainsworth as Bill Alexander

== Reception ==
In its review, Digital Retribution criticized the film's uninteresting characters, dialogue, and lack of screen time of the title monster.

== Home media ==
Behemoth was released on DVD on April 5, 2011, by RHI Entertainment. It was re-released as a part of a 3-disc set which included the complete Maneater series.
