= Haunted (2002 TV series) =

Television show filmed in Vancouver

- Promotional poster
- Genre: Horror; Drama
- Created by: Andrew Cosby; Rich Ramage
- Starring: Matthew Fox; Russell Hornsby; Lynn Collins; Michael Irby; John Mann
- Composer: Mark Snow
- Country of origin: United States
- Original language: English
- No. of seasons: 1
- No. of episodes: 11

Production
- Executive producers: Emile Levisetti; Keith Addis; Scott Shepherd
- Production location: Vancouver
- Running time: 42 minutes
- Production companies: Industry Entertainment; CBS Productions; Viacom Productions

Original release
- Network: UPN
- Release: September 24 – November 5, 2002

Haunted is an American horror drama television series that first aired on September 24, 2002 on UPN. The program, which was filmed in Vancouver, was canceled on November 5, 2002 due to low ratings. As a result, only seven of the completed episodes were aired on UPN. However, all eleven filmed episodes have been shown in later airings of the show.

== Plot ==
Police officer Frank Taylor had the perfect job and perfect family. After his son's unsolved abduction, his life, marriage and career disintegrate. He leaves the force to become a private investigator specializing in missing and abducted children cases. His ex-wife has come to terms with the loss of their child, but Frank is obsessed with one day finding their son.

One day Frank's life is forever changed while trying to apprehend Simon, a man linked to several child abductions who eludes the police. A fatal clash leaves Simon dead and Frank in critical condition. As the doctors try to save his life, Frank has a near-death experience in which he sees his missing son.

When Frank regains consciousness, he finds that the dead can communicate with him, and that their confusing and frightening manifestations are usually intended to help him in his work. Some of the dead however—including Simon—abuse his new abilities to intentionally mislead or harm him.

== Cast ==
- Matthew Fox as Frank Taylor
- Russell Hornsby as Marcus Bradshaw
- John Mann as Simon Dunn
- Lynn Collins as Jessica Manning
- Michael Irby as Dante
- Bree Michael Warner as Anna

== Broadcast and syndication ==
In September 2007, the series began airing on Sci Fi. In 2009, Chiller began airing this program as part of their daily marathon line-up. It plays there sporadically. A marathon of the entire series ran all day on October 31, 2010 on Universal HD.

== Home media ==
Phase 4 Films released The Complete Series on DVD on April 13, 2010.

On May 29, 2018, Kino Lorber released Haunted: The Complete Series on Blu-ray for the first time.

== Episodes ==
No.	Title	Directed by	Written by	Original release date	U.S. viewers (millions)
1	"Pilot"	Michael Rymer	Rick Ramage and Andrew Cosby	September 24, 2002	3.14
Private detective Frank Taylor, whose marriage to Jessica Manning ended after their son was abducted, kills a pedophile, Simon Dunn, and almost dies himself. When he discovers he can now see the dead, he uses this ability to find a missing boy kidnapped by Simon, who now haunts him.
2	"Grievous Angels"	Jeffrey Reiner	Erin Maher and Kay Reindl	October 1, 2002	N/A
Frank searches for a missing teen clubber. He clashes with people connected to the rock band Grievous Angels.
3	"Fidelity"	Rick Wallace	Rob Wright	October 8, 2002	2.47
A serial killer targets women in sleazy motels.
4	"Abby"	Martha Mitchell	Moira Kirland Dekker	October 15, 2002	N/A
Former police colleague, Marcus Bradshaw, enlists Frank's help in solving a ritualistic murder which resembles a case Marcus thought he'd solved years before in New Orleans.
5	"Blind Witness"	Peter Markle	Rob Wright	October 22, 2002	N/A
A blind military vet's ghost tries to lead Frank to the crime scene where a teenage girl was killed. Frank is temporarily blinded by the ghost.
6	"Nocturne"	Vern Gillum	Andrew Cosby	October 29, 2002	N/A
Frank becomes a suspect in the attempted murder of a woman he has no memory of meeting. Marcus and Jessica fight to help him.
7	"A Three-Hour Tour"	Rick Wallace	Story by : Emile Levisetti; Teleplay by : Rick Ramage	November 5, 2002	N/A
Frank sees Jessica with her legal colleague. Later, after a car accident on a dark country road, Frank is taken in by a young girl and her reclusive parents who turn out to be ghosts still caring for their daughter.
8	"Nexus"	Michael Rymer	Story by : Andrew Cosby and Rick Ramage; Teleplay by : Rick Ramage	October 9, 2008	N/A
The evil spirit of Simon taunts Frank as a murdered woman's ghost seeks out her husband and the hit man he hired. Frank tries to learn more about Simon.
9	"Simon Redux"	Bill Norton	Rick Ramage	October 9, 2008	N/A
Frank's search for information about Simon leads him to the FBI where Simon had worked. This probing into his past angers Simon. When fellow lawyer Nicholas Trenton goes to Jessica's house for a date Simon invades his body. Trenton/Simon later attacks Jessica and Frank is able to rescue her and eject Simon from the lawyer.
10	"Last Call"	Bradford May	Story by : Andrew Cosby; Teleplay by : Andrew Cosby and Moira Kirland Dekker	October 9, 2008	N/A
A ghost trapped between this life and the next befriends Frank which makes Jessica jealous.
11	"Seeking Asylum"	Jerry Levine	Stacia Raymond	October 9, 2008	N/A
Frank goes undercover in a psychiatric hospital to find a woman's missing fiancé.

== Ratings ==
Season	Timeslot	Season premiere	Season finale	TV season	Rank	Viewers (in millions)	18–49 Average
1	Tuesday 9pm/8c	September 24, 2002	November 5, 2002	2002	#153	2.21	1.4/2

== See also ==
- List of ghost films
