= Beeper (film) =

- Directed by: Jack Sholder
- Written by: Michael J. Cordell; Gregory Gieras
- Story by: Michael J. Cordell
- Produced by: Vicky Pike; Morris Ruskin
- Starring: Ed Quinn; Harvey Keitel; Joey Lauren Adams; Gulshan Grover
- Cinematography: Ajayan Vincent
- Edited by: Andrew Horvitch
- Music by: J. Peter Robinson
- Production company: Shoreline Entertainment
- Distributed by: Usha Kiran Movies International
- Release date: October 10, 2002 (Austin Film Festival)
- Running time: 94 minutes
- Country: United States
- Language: English

Beeper is a 2002 American crime thriller film directed by Jack Sholder and starring Ed Quinn, Harvey Keitel, Joey Lauren Adams and Gulshan Grover.

The thriller Beeper concerns a doctor working in India whose son is kidnapped. Left with nothing more but the title device as a way to communicate with the kidnappers, the man must make his way through the seedy underground in order to rescue his son. Among the people he must team up with is a drug dealer called Zolo (Harvey Keitel).

== Plot ==
Dr. Richard is a single parent living in America with his 10 year old son, Sam. He is invited to attend a medical conference in Delhi, India, and since he is unable to find a suitable person to babysit his son, he takes him along with him. At the venue Richard makes his presentation, and shortly thereafter notices that his son is missing. A hectic search does not reveal Sam's whereabouts, the police are summoned and the matter is assigned to Senior Inspector, Vijay Kumar, of Delhi Police, with an American Anti-terrorist Policewoman, Julia Hyde, also assisting him. Richard is informed that his son has been kidnapped and that he must comply with the kidnappers directions and instructions via a beeper. Shortly thereafter, Richard is informed that he has made a mistake by involving the police, as such Vijay pulls himself and his men off of the case. Richard is now on his own, and he has until midnight to try to comply with the kidnappers demands in a foreign country where the death of a human being, even a child, is not considered earth-shaking news. To make matters worse, he loses his beeper to a man who collided with him in a busy market-place. He does get hold of another beeper - which belongs to Zolo, a drug smuggler. Richard finds that he must first comply with Zolo's instructions before he can make an effort to locate the original beeper. In the meantime, Vijay has placed Richard under surveillance, as he suspects him of feigning his son's kidnapping in order to smuggle opium worth half a million dollars. To complicate matters even more Richard is convinced that Sam has been kidnapped by a person who is either a policeman or someone connected closely with the Delhi Police. Watch as events propel this poor doctor to an unbelievable climax that may cost him his very life.

== Cast ==
- Ed Quinn as Dr. Richard Avery
- Harvey Keitel as Zolo
- Joey Lauren Adams as Inspector Julia Hyde
- Gulshan Grover as Sr. Inspector Vijay Kumar
- Tony Mirchandani
- Vinay Varma as Tiger
- Stefan Djordjevic as Sam Avery

== Reception ==
Scott Weinberg of DVDTalk.com gave it 2.5 out of 5 and suggested "Should it pop up on cable one insomniatic evening and you can watch it without dropping any money, sure, give Beeper a spin and see if it works for you."
