= Silver (graphic novel series) =

Graphic novel series by Stephan Franck

Silver is a graphic novel series by American writer and artist Stephan Franck. The first book in the series was nominated for the 2014 Russ Manning Award. The four books in the series were released from 2014 to 2018.

== Books ==
=== Plot ===
The plot of Silver follows the adventures of Pulp era con men who team up with Professor Van Helsing's granddaughter to steal an ancient treasure hidden away in Dracula's castle.

== Adaptation ==
During New York Comic Con 2017, Deadline Hollywood reported that writer Andrew Cosby was asked to pen a movie adaptation.

== Reception ==
In its review of the 2018 Free Comic Book Day titles, NPR's Glen Weldon wrote “Writer/artist Stephan Franck is firing on all cylinders.... Stylish black-and-white art, and a smart, charmingly roguish point-of-view-character draw you in.”. Comic book reviews site Newsarama gave the first volume 10 stars out of 10.
