= Jaime Paglia =

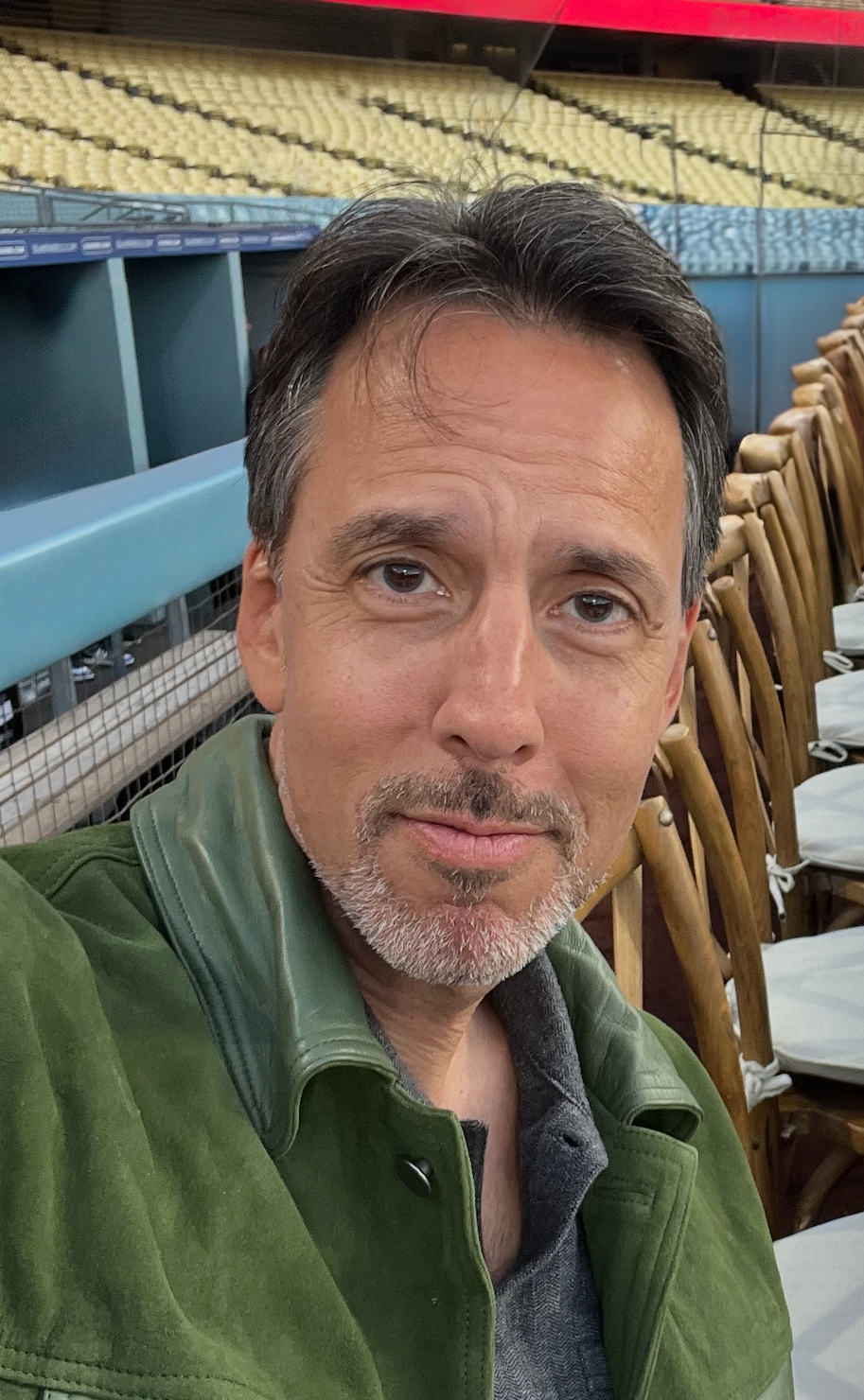
- Jaime Paglia at Dodger Stadium in Los Angeles, California, August 2024
- Occupations: Screenwriter; Showrunner; Producer; Director
- Years active: 1996–present

Jaime Paglia is an American screenwriter, showrunner, producer and director. He is best known for co-creating and executive producing Eureka (2006–2012).

== Life and career ==
He attended the University of California, Santa Cruz majoring in economics for three weeks, before finding his passion with the theatre arts/film program. He minored in English literature.

His first show business endeavour was as an assistant in feature film publicity at MGM Studios, which led to him meeting many executives. For his first spec script sale, he partnered with college friend, David Draffin, for the feature film action-comedy, "Bombshell," with executive producers Team Todd and New Line Cinema.

He went on to co-write the Christmas action-comedy, "Kringle," with Andrew Cosby, and executive producers Akiva Goldsman and Mark Canton. Later, Paglia and Cosby went on to co-create Eureka for the Syfy channel.

=== Eureka ===
In 2003, Paglia and Cosby sold their dramedy Eureka to Syfy as a pitch. In July 2006, the series premiered to critical and viewer success. Over the course of the show's seven-year run and 77 episodes, Paglia was the co-showrunner and wrote 20 episodes. He made his directing debut with the fifth-season episode, "Jack of All Trades."

=== The Flash ===
In summer 2014, Paglia was hired as co-executive producer to run the writers' room on the first season of the DC Comics produced CW superhero series The Flash. He co-wrote the series' 6th episode, "The Flash Is Born," which introduced the supervillain Girder.

=== Scream TV Series ===
In 2015, Paglia was hired as executive producer and co-showrunner for season one of the MTV slasher series Scream. Paglia is credited for writing the 6th episode, "Betrayed," and the season one finale, "Revelations."

== Filmography ==
=== Television ===
The numbers in credits refer to the number of episodes.

Title	Year	Credited as				Network	Notes
Title	Year	Creator	Director	Writer	Executive producer	Network	Notes
Eureka	2006–12	Yes	Yes (1)	Yes (21)	Yes	Sci Fi	
The Flash	2014	No	No	Yes (1)	co-executive (6)	The CW	
Scream	2015	No	No	Yes (2)	co-executive (10)	MTV	
The Teenage Psychic	2019	No	No	No	No	PTS	consulting producer; season 2
