= Neil Grayston (actor) =

Canadian actor (born 1981)

Neil Gordon Grayston
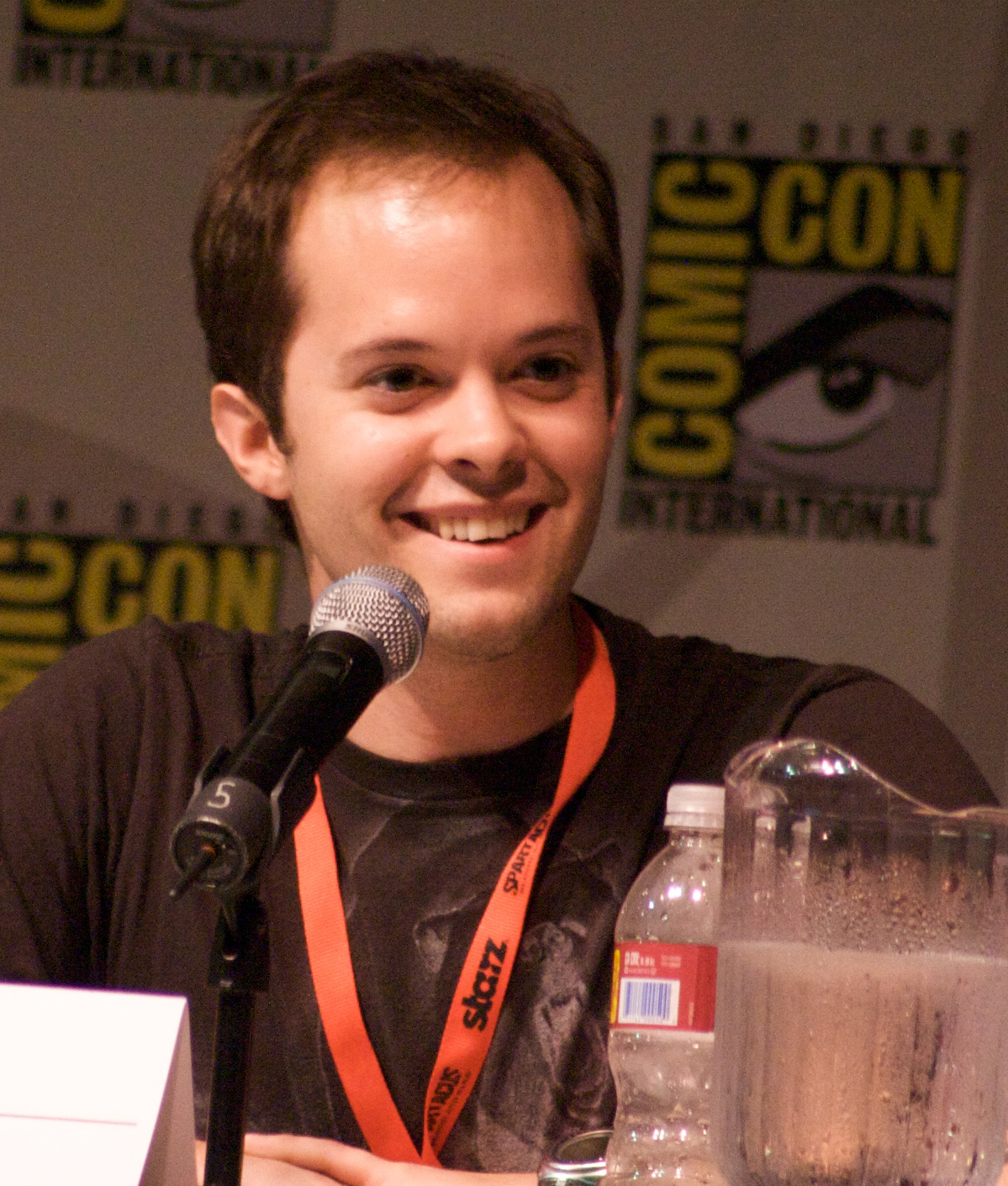
- Grayston at the 2009 San Diego Comic-Con
- Born: March 24, 1981 (age 45); New Westminster, British Columbia, Canada
- Occupation: Actor
- Years active: 2000–present

Neil Gordon Grayston (born March 24, 1981) is a Canadian actor.

== Biography ==
He was nominated in 2006 for a Leo Award (Best Supporting Performance by a Male in a Dramatic Series) for his performance in the Godiva's episode "The Bigger Man". Grayston played Douglas Fargo in Eureka, a Syfy network series that began broadcasting in 2006.

Grayston is of Scottish, French, Romanian and Irish descent.

== Filmography ==
=== Film ===
Title	Year	Role	Notes
The Water Game	2002	Adam	
Stan Maynard's Best Day Ever	2008	Stan Maynard	Short film
Spare Change	2015	Sam	post-production

=== Television ===
Title	Year	Role	Notes
Da Vinci's Inquest	2000	William Collette	1 episode: "This Shit Is Evil"
UC: Undercover	2001	Teenage boy	1 episode: "Of Fathers and Sons"
Edgemont	2001–2002	Jordon Rosen	Recurring cast (9 episodes)
Jeremiah	2002	Prisoner Adam	1 episode: "...And the Ground, Sown with Salt"
Smallville	2002	Russell Burton	1 episode: "Redux"
Wonderfalls	2004	Alec "Mouthbreather"	Recurring cast (7 episodes)
Dead Like Me	2004	Ethan	1 episode: "The Shallow End"
Earthsea	2004	Roke student with knife	Miniseries
Godiva's	2005–2006	Martin	Main cast
The Dead Zone	2005	Trey Walters	1 episode: "Vanguard"
Romeo!	2006	Mike	1 episode: "Fraternity Ro"
The Time Tunnel	2006	Brother Jacques Mitton	Television film
Eureka	2006–2012	Douglas Fargo; SARAH (voice)	Main cast
Supernatural	2007	Frat pledge	1 episode: "Tall Tales"
Warehouse 13	2010, 2011	Douglas Fargo	2 episodes: "13.1" and "Don't Hate the Player"
End of the World	2013	Steve Palmer	Television film
Psych	2013	Jason Straub	1 episode: "Santa Barbarian Candidate"
Package Deal	2014	Steve Woodman	1 episode: "Breakup Part 1"
Daredevil	2016	Christopher Roth	1 episode: "Regrets Only"
iZombie	2017	Seth	1 episode: "Looking for Mr. Goodbrain, Part 1"
Girlfriends' Guide to Divorce	2017	Cameron	1 episode: "Rule #706: Let Them Eat Cupcakes"
Loudermilk	2018	Peter Mason	2 episodes: "Wake" and "Presidio"
The Magicians	2019	Isaac Karamov	2 episodes: "A Flock of Lost Birds" and "Lost, Found, Fucked"

=== Webseries ===
Title	Year	Role	Notes
Eureka: Hide and Seek	2006	Douglas Fargo	4 episodes
The True Heroines	2013	Percy Andrews	5 episodes
Spooked	2014	Lindsey	
