= Eureka (2006 TV series) =

American comedy drama science fiction television series (2006–2012)

- Also known as: A Town Called Eureka
- Genre: Science fiction; Comedy drama
- Created by: Andrew Cosby; Jaime Paglia
- Starring: Colin Ferguson; Salli Richardson-Whitfield; Joe Morton; Debrah Farentino; Jordan Danger; Ed Quinn; Erica Cerra; Neil Grayston; Niall Matter; Matt Frewer; Tembi Locke; James Callis
- Theme music composer: Mark Mothersbaugh; John Enroth
- Opening theme: "Eureka on My Mind"
- Ending theme: "Eureka on My Mind" (season 1) "Carter's Theme" (seasons 2–5)
- Composers: Bear McCreary; Mark Mothersbaugh; Mutato Muzika
- Country of origin: United States
- Original language: English
- No. of seasons: 5
- No. of episodes: 77 (TV episodes) + 8 (webisodes) (list of episodes)

Production
- Executive producers: Jaime Paglia; Bruce Miller; Matthew Hastings; Stephen Welke; Paula Yoo; Wendy Wallace
- Production locations: Vancouver and Chilliwack, British Columbia
- Camera setup: Single-camera
- Running time: 44 minutes
- Production companies: Universal Media Studios (2006–2008) (Note: Credited as NBC Universal Television Studio (2006–2007).); Universal Cable Productions; (2008–2012)

Original release
- Network: Sci-Fi Channel
- Release: July 18, 2006 – July 16, 2012

Related
- Warehouse 13

Eureka (stylized as EUR^{e}KA) is an American science fiction television series that premiered on Sci-Fi Channel (renamed Syfy in 2009) on July 18, 2006. The fifth and final season ended on July 16, 2012. The show is set in the fictional town of Eureka, Southern Oregon (although in the pilot episode Eureka was located in Washington – and the origin of a diamond in the episode "Best in Faux" was shown as Eureka, California). Most residents of Eureka are scientific geniuses who work for Global Dynamics – an advanced research facility responsible for the development of nearly all major technological breakthroughs since its inception. Each episode featured a mysterious accidental or intentional misuse of technology, which the town sheriff, Jack Carter, dealt with, with the help of the town scientists. Each season also featured a larger story arc that concerned a particular major event or item.

The series was created by Andrew Cosby and Jaime Paglia and produced by Universal Media Studios. While initially lacking in critical acclaim, Eureka was a ratings success for the network, averaging 3.2 million viewers during the second half of season three. In 2007, Eureka was nominated for the Emmy Award for Outstanding Visual Effects for a Series, and won the Leo Award for Best Visual Effects in a Dramatic Series. In the United Kingdom and Ireland, the show airs on Syfy and is known as A Town Called Eureka, although it is also shown under its original title on the BT Vision platform.

== Synopsis ==
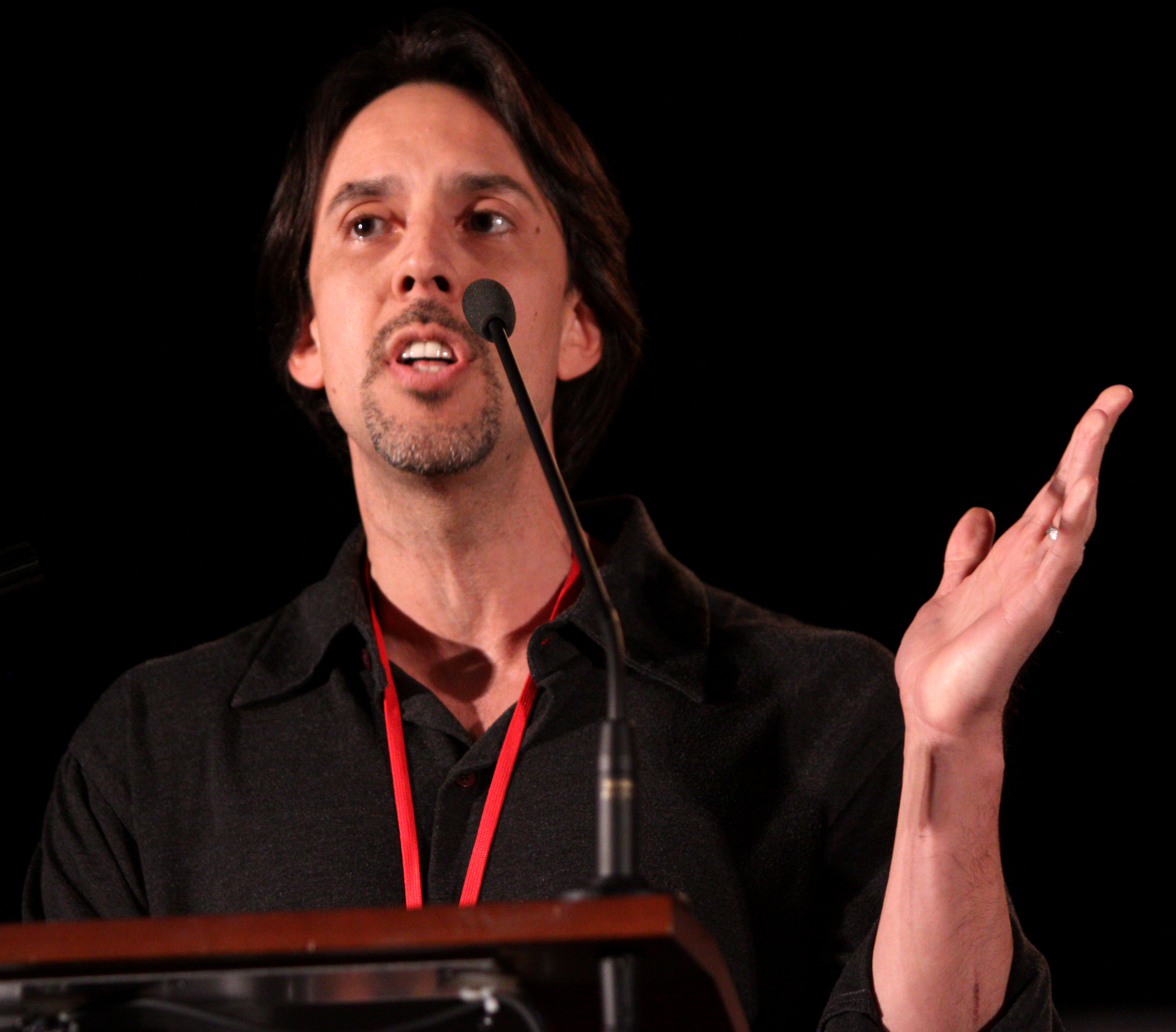
Jaime Paglia, co-creator of Eureka, at the 2011 Phoenix Comicon.

Eureka takes place in a high-tech fictional community of the same name, located in the U.S. state of Oregon and inhabited by brilliant scientists. Camouflaged by an electromagnetic shield, the town is operated by a corporation called Global Dynamics (GD), which is overseen by the United States Department of Defense. The town's existence and location are closely guarded secrets.

Deputy United States Marshal Jack Carter stumbles upon Eureka while transporting a fugitive prisoner (his own rebellious teenage daughter Zoe) back to her mother's home in Los Angeles. When a faulty experiment cripples the sheriff of Eureka, Carter finds himself quickly chosen to fill the vacancy. Despite not being a genius like most members of the town, Jack Carter demonstrates a remarkable ability to connect to others, keen and practical insights, and a dedication to preserving the safety of Eureka.

== Cast and characters ==
=== Main characters ===
- Sheriff Jack Carter, portrayed by Colin Ferguson, is a U.S. Marshal who reluctantly ends up as the sheriff of Eureka. Jack is consistently dumbfounded by the wonders Eureka produces, as well as its propensity to produce things that often threaten the entire town (or world). Despite being a man of average intelligence in a town full of geniuses, Jack's admittedly simple ideas and his intuition often save the day.
- Zoe Carter, portrayed by Jordan Danger (credited as Jordan Hinson, seasons 1–3, recurring in seasons 4–5), is Jack's rebellious teenage daughter. Unlike her father, she is intelligent enough to keep up with the town's residents. Yet, like her father, she also possesses street smarts, something lacking for most of the town's residents. She hopes to attend Harvard Medical School and become a physician and later does due to an alternate timeline.
- Dr. Allison Blake, portrayed by Salli Richardson-Whitfield, is a Department of Defense agent who acts as the liaison between Global Dynamics and the federal government in season one. Later, she becomes the head of Global Dynamics. Allison, unmarried, is mother of Kevin, who has autism, but is shown to have improved symptoms in an alternate timeline (apparently attributable to high-tech cranial implants).
- Dr. Henry Deacon, portrayed by Joe Morton, is the town jack of all trades and a brilliant scientist. Henry has ethical objections to the kind of research conducted at Global Dynamics, so he prefers to be employed as the town's mechanic. Henry's assistance is often invaluable in defusing the bad situations that are created by experiments at Global Dynamics.
- Dr. Jim Taggart, portrayed by Matt Frewer, is a somewhat eccentric animal expert. He works in geophysics.
- Vincent, portrayed by Chris Gauthier, is the owner of Cafe Diem.
- Dr. Nathan Stark, portrayed by Ed Quinn (seasons 1–3), is one of Eureka's top scientists. He and Jack are frequently at odds, although both respect each other. On and off, he is romantically involved with Allison. He is modeled after Tony Stark, a Marvel Comics character.
- Dr. Beverly Barlowe, portrayed by Debrah Farentino (seasons 1–2, recurring in seasons 4-5), is the town psychiatrist. She secretly works for a mysterious organization known as the Consortium, which has expressed a desire to exploit Eureka's innovations by whatever means necessary.
- Josephina "Jo" Lupo, portrayed by Erica Cerra (recurring in seasons 1–2, regular in seasons 3–5), is Eureka's deputy sheriff. She is a former U.S. Army Ranger with a love of firearms.
- Dr. Douglas Fargo, portrayed by Neil Grayston (recurring in seasons 1–2, regular in seasons 3–5), is a junior scientist, treated somewhat dismissively by his peers. Accident-prone, he often ends up a victim of the disasters befalling the town, and has caused a fair share of the problems. Grayston also provides the voice of S.A.R.A.H. (Self Actuated Residential Automated Habitat), the bunker home Jack and Zoe Carter live in.
- Zane Donovan, portrayed by Niall Matter (recurring in season 2, regular in seasons 3–5), is a rebellious genius who is recruited to Global Dynamics. He allegedly caused a stock market crash, and agreed to work for GD as an alternative to imprisonment.
- Dr. Grace Monroe, portrayed by Tembi Locke, (seasons 4–5) a scientist, mechanic, and wife of Henry Deacon in an alternate timeline created after the Eureka Five time-traveled to 1947.

== Episodes ==
Season	Episodes		Originally released	
Season	Episodes		First released	Last released
1	12		July 18, 2006	October 3, 2006
2	13		July 10, 2007	October 2, 2007
3	18	8	July 29, 2008	September 23, 2008
3	18	10	July 10, 2009	September 18, 2009
4	21	10	July 9, 2010	December 7, 2010
4	21	11	July 11, 2011	December 6, 2011
5	13		April 16, 2012	July 16, 2012

== Production ==
The series was created by Andrew Cosby and Jaime Paglia and was produced by Universal Media Studios. The season one original music was composed by Mutato Muzika; season two and beyond were composed by Bear McCreary. The executive producers were Paglia, Charles Grant Craig, and Thania St. John. While initially lacking in strong critical acclaim, Eureka had been a popular success, averaging 3.2 million viewers during the second half of season three. In 2007 Eureka was nominated for the Emmy Award for Outstanding Visual Effects for a Series and won the Leo Award for Best Visual Effects in a Dramatic Series. In the United Kingdom on Sky1 the show is known as A Town Called Eureka, although it is also shown under its original name on the BT Vision platform.

Characters from Eureka have crossed over to Warehouse 13 and vice versa, and characters from Warehouse 13 have crossed over to Alphas, making the triplet sister shows.

On August 17, 2010, the channel, now known as Syfy, announced that the show had been picked up for a fifth season of 13 episodes. Fan sites and a show writers' Twitter feed said on August 4, 2011, that the show had been picked up for a sixth and possibly final season of six episodes. It was then announced on August 8, 2011, that Eureka would not get a sixth season, but it would instead be canceled after season five. However, one additional episode of the fifth season was approved in order to give the series a proper finale. On February 16, 2012, Syfy announced that the show's fifth and final season would premiere on April 16, 2012.

=== Filming locations ===
- Chilliwack, British Columbia – Downtown Wellington Avenue Cafe Diem set all five seasons.
- Ladysmith, British Columbia – Downtown First Avenue, Roberts Street.
- Burnaby, British Columbia – Vancouver Film Studios for the majority of the insides of Global Dynamics, Café Diem and S.A.R.A.H.

== Crossovers ==
Eureka was part of Sci-Fi's developing shared fictional universe, with several characters crossing over between series:

- Global Dynamics researcher Douglas Fargo (played by Neil Grayston) from Eureka traveled to South Dakota to update Warehouse 13's computer system in the Warehouse 13 episode "13.1". Warehouse 13 computer wizard Claudia Donovan (played by Allison Scagliotti) subsequently traveled to the town of Eureka, Oregon to check out the technological marvels at Global Dynamics in the Eureka episode "Crossing Over".
- Fargo again appeared in the Warehouse 13 episode "Don't Hate the Player" when Claudia, Lattimer, and Bering traveled to Palo Alto, California to find Fargo beta testing a virtual reality simulator with the aid of a dangerous artifact.
- Additionally, Hugo Miller spent some time in the town of Eureka, departing with Douglas Fargo at the end of episode "13.1"; he returns in "Love Sick", commenting that, "every week [there] something seems to go 'boom'!" His presence there is off screen.

== Reception ==
=== Ratings and viewership ===
The series premiere was watched by 4.1 million people, making it the top-rated cable program for that night; it was the highest-rated series launch in Sci-Fi's fourteen-year history. The season two premiere drew 2.5 million viewers, making it the top-rated cable program of the day.

For calendar-year 2008 as a first-run, the series delivered 1.42 million viewers in the 18–49 demographic.

The third season premiere was viewed by 2.8 million viewers, and the season 3.5 premiere of Eureka earned 2.68 million viewers in its new time slot. The fourth season premiere was viewed by 2.5 million viewers. The fifth season premiere was viewed by 1.8 million viewers, on par with season four's closing episode "One Giant Leap". The fifth season closer "Just Another Day" generated 1.58 million viewers.

=== Critical reception ===
Critical reaction was mixed, with general praise for the premise, but overall middling reaction to the writing of the pilot.

The Seattle Post-Intelligencer:

It's all very quirky. Too quirky, maybe, for an audience that is used to spaceships, robots, and explosions. Though every episode promises an "aha!" moment based in quantum physics and obscure scientific laws, this world is relatively flat, conceptually speaking, in comparison to the complexity woven into series such as Stargate SG-1 and Battlestar Galactica. This does not mean Eureka is a complete waste of time. Not at all. The characters are fun, Ferguson is believable and pleasant, the script is solidly constructed, and the visuals are slickly produced. All in all, it's a sweet series and probably not long for this world.

The New York Daily News:

With its playful new series Eureka, set in the Pacific Northwest and telling the story of an outsider who comes to explore, and settle in, a remote town full of eccentrics, Sci-Fi Channel isn't just inviting comparisons to Twin Peaks and Northern Exposure. It's demanding them. But co-creators Andrew Cosby and Jaime Paglia hold up to them pretty well. Eureka has a premise, a cast and a plot that make it one of the TV treats of the summer. The folks at Sci-Fi Channel clearly intended to reinvent the summer TV series here, and come up with something breezy and fun. And Eureka – they've done it!

=== Awards and nominations ===
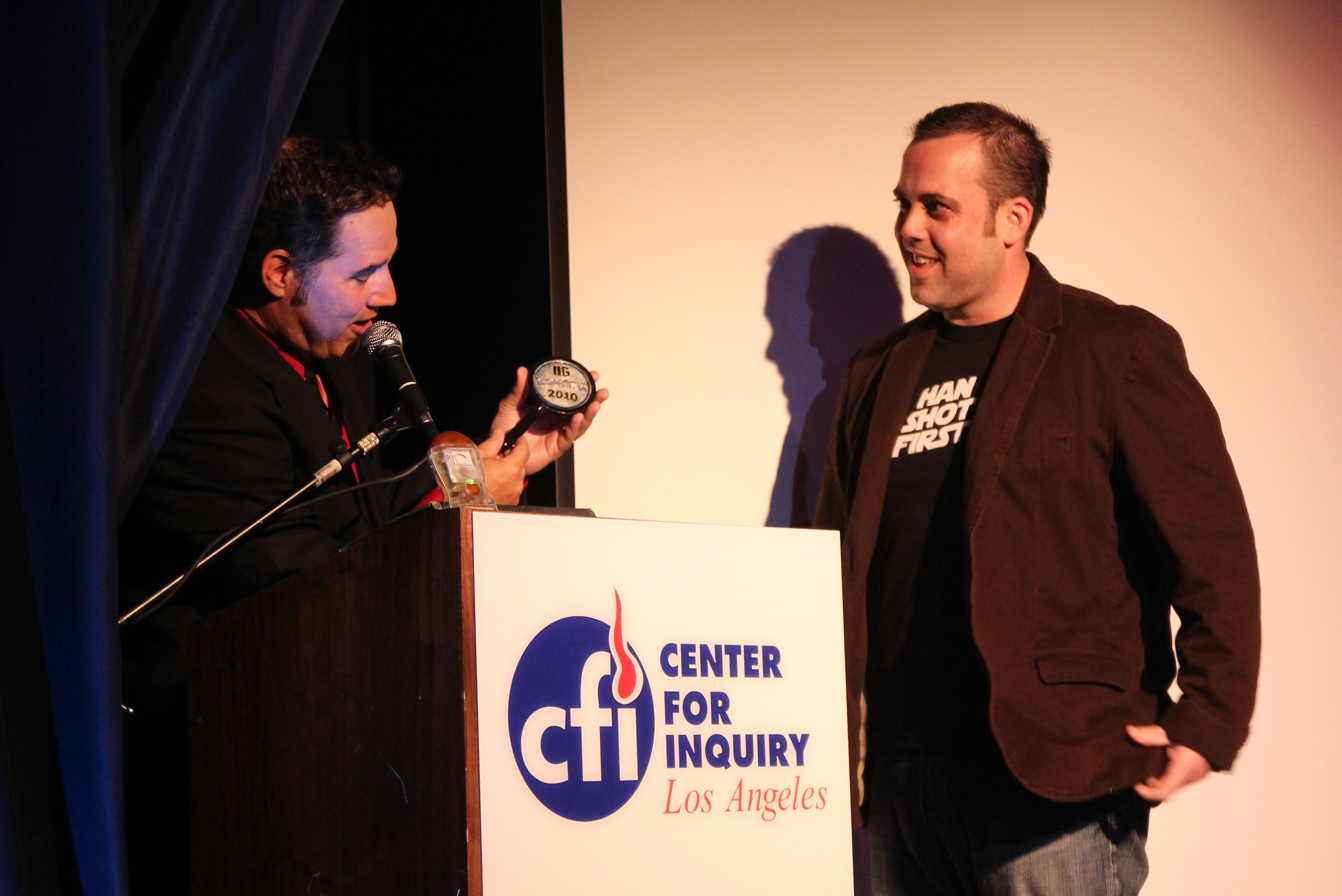
Director of Center for Inquiry & IIG, James Underdown presents writer Ed Fowler with an award on August 21, 2010.

- Eureka was nominated for a 2007 Primetime Emmy Award for Outstanding Special Visual Effects for a Series. The other nominees were Grey's Anatomy, Heroes, Rome, and Battlestar Galactica (the winner).
- On August 21, 2010, Eureka was honoured with an award for its scientific, and critical thinking content, from The Independent Investigations Group during its 10th Anniversary Gala. The award was accepted by head writer Ed Fowler.

== Cancellation ==
On August 8, 2011, it was announced that Eureka would be cancelled after five seasons. Syfy decided not to order a season six of Eureka: "But Eureka is not over yet. There is a new holiday episode this December and 12 stellar episodes set to debut next year, marking its fifth season and six memorable years on Syfy. The 2012 episodes are some of the best we've seen, and will bring this great series to a satisfying end. We are very grateful to Bruce Miller and Jaime Paglia, their team of incredible writers, and an amazing cast and crew who have consistently delivered a series we continue to be very proud of. We thank the fans for their support of this show and know they will enjoy its final season in 2012."

With the announcement of the show's cancellation, a fan campaign on social media emerged. Thousands of fans protested what they thought was the network's decision. Executive producer Amy Berg clarified that the decision to cancel the show was made by Comcast, the controlling partner at NBCUniversal, which owns Syfy.

Everyone is asking why. It's simple, really. We are the network's golden child in every way, except profit margins. Fact is, #Eureka is an expensive show to make. And we could not maintain the quality of our show with the cuts it would take to make us profitable for Syfy's new parent company. Our creative execs at Syfy fought hard to keep us. Trust me, they LOVE us. We just couldn't make the numbers work.

— Twitter (via tvseriesfinale.com), Amy Berg

== In other media ==
=== Home media releases ===
All five seasons of Eureka have been released to Region 1 and region 2 on DVD. Seasons 1–4 have been released in region 4. Season 3 and 4 were released in two separate sets for each season in region 1 and 2.

In 2014, Universal released the complete series to the German market as an 18-disc Blu-Ray box set (aka Eureka: Die Komplette Serie or Eureka Gesamtbox). This set is region-free and will play on Region A (North America) players. It is available to American buyers via online retailers. This set retains the original English-language audio. Titles and on-screen instructions can be switched to English in the disc menus.

In 2020, Mill Creek Entertainment released the complete series to the American market as a 12-disc Blu-Ray box set. Extras mostly mirror those in the 2014 box set, though two extended episodes from the 2014 set are not included. Critical and buyer reviews report this set has significant issues with video quality.

=== Soundtrack ===
Eureka: Original Soundtrack From the Sci-Fi Channel Television Series

Soundtrack album by Bear McCreary
- Released: August 26, 2008
- Genre: Instrumental
- Length: 76:39
- Label: La La Land Records

Bear McCreary chronology
Battlestar Galactica: Season Three (2007)	Eureka: Original Soundtrack From the Sci-Fi Channel Television Series (2008)	Terminator: The Sarah Connor Chronicles (2008)

A soundtrack was released on August 26, 2008 on La La Land Records. The album consists of 28 tracks from the show's second season. It also includes two variations of the Mark Mothersbaugh and John Enroth composed main theme.

All music is composed by Bear McCreary, except noted.

Side one
No.	Title	Writer(s)	Episode	Length
1.	"Eureka On My Mind"	Mark Mothersbaugh and John Enroth	All	0:32
2.	"Sheriff Carter's Theme"		Maneater	3:29
3.	"Prehistoric Love Spores"		Maneater	2:40
4.	"Allison's Theme"		Games People Play	2:54
5.	"Through the Vortex"		Games People Play	5:04
6.	"Fargo's Theme"		Noche de Sueños	2:51
7.	"The Mask of Fargo"		Noche de Sueños	2:29
8.	"The S.A.R.A.H. Mobile"		Duck, Duck, Goose	1:18
9.	"Let's Get Hitched"	Brendan McCreary	Sight Unseen	3:56
10.	"When You Wish Upon Falling Debris"		Duck, Duck, Goose	3:12
11.	"Little Big Bang"		E=MC...?	2:35
12.	"Henry's Theme"		A Night at Global Dynamics	5:23
13.	"Taggart's Theme"		A Night at Global Dynamics	2:04
14.	"The Laser Canon"		A Night at Global Dynamics	1:56
15.	"Noche de Suenos"		Noche de Suenos	3:25
16.	"A Nuke for Fargo"		Try, Try Again	5:43
17.	"EurekAerobic"	Captain Ahab	Duck, Duck, Goose	2:33
18.	"Victor's Getaway"		Try, Try Again	0:36
19.	"Henry and Beverly"		All That Glitters	4:26
20.	"Jack and Callie"		Sight Unseen", "Maneater	2:33
21.	"Everyone's Dumb"		E=MC...?	1:50
22.	"The Heathers"		Duck, Duck, Goose	0:39
23.	"Zane on the Lam"		E=MC...?	2:44
24.	"Erotomania!"		Maneater	2:28
25.	"A Night at Global Dynamics"		A Night at Global Dynamics	3:54
26.	"Threat of Nuclear Cleaning"		A Night at Global Dynamics	2:21
27.	"A Town Called Eureka"			2:13
28.	"Eureka on My Mind (Reprise)"	Mark Mothersbaugh and John Enroth		0:51

=== Internet streaming services ===
All five seasons of Eureka are now available for viewing on-demand on

- Amazon Prime Video (for American Prime members)
- The Roku Channel for all Roku owners.

=== Comics ===
In early 2009, Boom! Studios produced a comic book series based on storylines provided by Andrew Cosby (who is also the co-founder of the comic publisher), written by Brendan Hay, with art by Diego Barreto. This was followed by a second 4-issue series called Eureka: Dormant Gene written by Andrew Cosby, Jaime Paglia and Jonathan L. Davis, with art by Mark Dos Santos.

=== Novels ===
- Eureka: Substitution Method. Cris Ramsay, New York: Ace, August 2010. ISBN 9780441018857
- Eureka: Brain Box Blues. Cris Ramsay, New York: Ace, November 2010. ISBN 9780441019830
- Eureka: Road Less Traveled. Cris Ramsay, New York: Ace, March 2011. ISBN 9780441019021

=== Podcast appearances ===
In 2011, Colin Ferguson appeared on Disasterpiece Theatre, discussing what Eureka might look like if directed by Michael Bay. In 2012, Niall Matter also made an appearance on the podcast, discussing how Eureka would function as a "romcom".

In May 2012, Ferguson appeared on Tabletop, a show on Geek & Sundry, where during the course of the episode he discusses his experiences and character in Eureka. The Geek & Sundry network is co-hosted, among others, by Felicia Day and Wil Wheaton, who made various appearances on Eureka.
