= Amy Berg (writer) =

American screenwriter

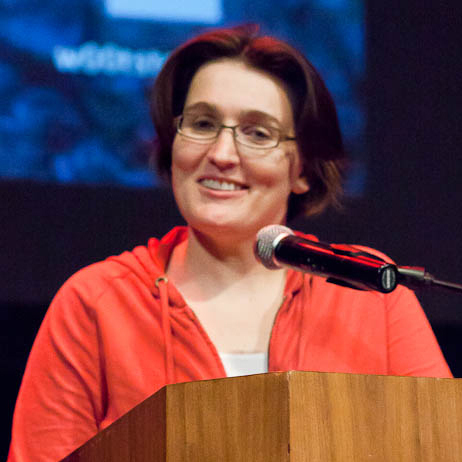
Berg in July 2011

Amy Berg (born May 5) is an American screenwriter and television showrunner.

== Biography ==
Berg grew up in Castro Valley, California.

Berg has worked in various writer, producer, and showrunner capacities on TV shows including Counterpart, Jack Ryan, The Alienist, Da Vinci's Demons, Person of Interest, Eureka, Leverage, and The 4400. Her other television credits include Boomtown, Threshold and Warrior Nun.

Berg was a featured performer at w00tstock 3.0 during San Diego Comic Con in 2011. In September 2011, she made a guest appearance as herself in an episode of Felicia Day's web series The Guild. In May 2013 she made a guest appearance as herself in an episode of Wil Wheaton's web series TableTop.

On April 15, 2019, Berg joined several other writers in firing their agents as part of the WGA's stand against the ATA and the practice of packaging.
