= Chris Gauthier =

British actor (1976–2024)

- Born: 27 January 1976; Luton, Bedfordshire, England
- Died: 23 February 2024 (aged 48)
- Occupation: Actor
- Years active: 1999–2024
- Spouse: Erin Gauthier (m. 2003)
- Children: 2

Chris Gauthier (27 January 1976 – 23 February 2024) was an English actor best known for his roles as Neville in Need for Speed: Carbon, Vincent in Eureka and William Smee in Once Upon a Time.

== Early life ==
Chris Gauthier was born in Luton, England. His family moved to Armstrong, British Columbia, Canada when he was five. Gauthier was trained in acting at the Vernon School of Speech and Drama.

== Career ==
Gauthier had a recurring role on the SyFy Channel series Eureka, as Café Diem owner Vincent. While filming the final ten episodes of season three of Eureka, he also filmed the 2009 CBS Mystery Event Harper's Island, in which he appeared as Malcolm Ross, and Freddy vs. Jason, in which he played Shack. On Smallville he portrayed Winslow Schott aka Toyman. In 2021, he co-starred in the Sony Pictures film produced by Build-A-Bear Entertainment, Honey Girls.

== Personal life ==
Gauthier married his wife Erin in November 2003 and the couple had two sons together.

=== Death ===
Gauthier died on 23 February 2024 at the age of 48 following a "short illness".

== Filmography ==
=== Film ===
| Year | Title | Role | Notes |
|---|---|---|---|
| 2002 | 40 Days and 40 Nights | Mikey | |
| 2003 | Freddy vs. Jason | Shack | |
| 2004 | Riding the Bullet | Hector Passmore | |
| 2006 | The Butterfly Effect 2 | Ted | |
| 2006 | The Foursome | Donnie Spencer | |
| 2007 | The Sandlot: Heading Home | Officer Pork Chop | |
| 2008 | Stargate: The Ark of Truth | Hertis | |
| 2009 | Space Buddies | Tad's Cameraman | |
| 2009 | Watchmen | Seymour | |
| 2010 | The Traveler | Desk Sargeant Gulloy | |
| 2017 | S.W.A.T.: Under Siege | Elson | Direct-to-video |
| 2021 | Honey Girls | Mac | |

=== Television ===
| Year | Title | Role | Notes |
|---|---|---|---|
| 2004 | Dead Like Me | Michael Lewis | 1 episode |
| 2005 | Earthsea | Vetch | 2 episodes |
| 2005 | School of Life | Vern Cote | Television film |
| 2007–2008 | Supernatural | Ronald Reznick | 2 episodes |
| 2006–2012 | Eureka | Vincent | 67 episodes |
| 2004, 2009–2011 | Smallville | Winslow Schott/Toyman | 4 episodes |
| 2008, 2014 | Psych | Earlie, Juror #3 | Episodes: "Murder? ... Anyone? ... Anyone? ... Bueller?", "Remake A.K.A. Cloudy... With a Chance of Improvement" |
| 2009 | Harper's Island | Malcolm Ross | 8 episodes |
| 2011 | Iron Invader | Tony | Television film |
| 2011–2013 | Health Nutz | Doc Jay Dang | 12 episodes |
| 2012 | Level Up | Sir Guy | Episode: "Leveling Up" |
| 2012–2018 | Once Upon a Time | William Smee | 14 episodes |
| 2014 | Signed, Sealed, Delivered | Serge | Episode: "Something Good" |
| 2015 | iZombie | Simon Cutler | Episode: "Virtual Reality Bites" |
| 2017–2019 | A Series of Unfortunate Events | Phil | 4 episodes |
| 2020 | The Christmas House | Marvelous Jim | Television film |
| 2023 | Joe Pickett | Randy Pope | Recurring cast |

=== Video games ===
| Year | Title | Role |
|---|---|---|
| 2006 | Need for Speed: Carbon | Neville |
