= Andrew Cosby =

American film producer

- Born: United States
- Occupations: Comic book creator, film producer, screenwriter
- Known for: Lucky Strike; Eureka

Andrew Cosby is an American comic book creator, film producer, and screenwriter. He is the co-creator of the SyFy TV series Eureka, and the co-founder of Boom! Studios.

== Career ==
=== Comics ===
Cosby worked at Malibu Comics from 1993 to 1995, at which time he left the company to pursue a career in films and was involved producing the feature film adaptation of Mage by comic book creator Matt Wagner with Spyglass Entertainment, and had various projects with Mike Medavoy (Phoenix Pictures), Mark Canton (The Canton Company), Akiva Goldsman, and Casey Silver.

In 2005, Cosby launched BOOM! Studios, creating their first published comic, Zombie Tales.

Working with Mike Richardson and Dark Horse, Cosby set up Damn Nation at MTV Films/Paramount Pictures, a comic book Cosby created and was subsequently attached to write and produce.

=== Feature films ===
Cosby produced the 2013 film 2 Guns. He has produced the film adaptation of Mage, by Matt Wagner, Talent, and Tag with Marc Platt Productions and Universal Studios, Damn Nation at MTV Films/Paramount Pictures, The Nightmare of Hugo Baring with Mike Medavoy (Phoenix Pictures), The Foundation at Paramount, Kringle with Mark Canton (The Canton Company), Akiva Goldsman, Creature Tech with Fox, Unusual Suspects with Lloyd Levin and Casey Silver, Saints Row with Lloyd Levin, based on the THQ video game, The Untamed, based on the Stranger Comics graphic novel, and Among the Dead with Nick Spicer and XYZ Films. Cosby received sole script credit for 2019's Hellboy film, a reboot of the Hellboy film series. Christopher Golden and Mike Mignola also contributed to the script, though both went uncredited. In October 2017, it was announced that Cosby would write the script for a film adaptation of the graphic novel Silver.

=== Television ===
Cosby co-created the UPN horror series Haunted and is the co-creator of the Syfy TV show Eureka, the series ran for five seasons ending in July 2012.

== Awards and nominations ==
Year	Award	Category	Work	Result
2020	Golden Raspberry Awards	Worst Screenplay	Hellboy	Nominated
