= Love Sick (Grimm) =

- Grimm episode
- Episode no.: Season 1 Episode 17
- Directed by: David Solomon
- Written by: Catherine Butterfield
- Cinematography by: Eliot Rockett
- Editing by: Jacque Toberen
- Production code: 117
- Original air date: April 13, 2012
- Running time: 42 minutes

Guest appearances
- Bree Turner as Rosalee Calvert; Claire Coffee as Adalind Schade; Jessica Tuck as Catherine Schade

Episode chronology
← Previous "The Thing with Feathers"	Next → "Cat and Mouse"
- Grimm season 1

"Love Sick" is the 17th episode of the supernatural drama television series Grimm of season 1, which premiered on April 13, 2012, on NBC. The episode was written by Catherine Butterfield, and was directed by David Solomon.

== Plot ==
Opening quote: "Forgive me for the evil I have done you; my mother drove me to it; it was done against my will."

Nick (David Giuntoli) continues studying the key his aunt gave him. He and Juliette (Bitsie Tulloch) go on a double date with Hank (Russell Hornsby). Nick is shocked to discover that Hank's date is Adalind Schade (Claire Coffee), the person who tried to kill Aunt Marie.

Captain Renard (Sasha Roiz) is approached by a bodyguard, Thomas Woolsey (Marti Matulis), who is under orders to escort him to his cousin, Anton Krug (Basil Harris). Anton states that the "family" needs the key or it will be forced to find Nick and retrieve it. Renard refuses and kills them both. He then meets Catherine Schade (Jessica Tuck), Adalind's mother. Nick confronts Adalind in the restaurant, but Hank interrupts to inform him of the murders of Krug and Woolsey. As they investigate, Nick notices Wu (Reggie Lee) eating a chapstick.

At the station, Wu passes out. Renard uses the distraction to steal a phone that could incriminate him in the murders, changing the SIM card before returning the phone to Nick's desk. Nick discovers from Monroe (Silas Weir Mitchell) and Rosalee (Bree Turner) that Hank has been given a love potion spell which, depending on his state, will be difficult to counteract. They realize Wu ingested the same potion and administer (and test) the antidote on him.

They get to Hank, but Adalind has altered the spell and the antidote will not work. Adalind calls Nick, telling him to give her the key or Hank will die by morning. Rosalee learns that the blood of a Grimm will kill the Hexenbiest spirit in Adalind and cure Hank. In the woods, Nick attacks Adalind and then kisses her, causing her to bite his lip and ingest his blood. The spirit leaves Adalind, leaving her a normal person. Hank wakes up.

Adalind returns to her mother's house; Catherine and Renard dismiss her as powerless and therefore useless to them. Renard acknowledges that he has underestimated Nick, who has thus proved himself valuable. The episode ends with Nick continuing his research on the key. He uses it as a stamp, and notices that the imprints of its sides fit together to form part of a larger image or map.

== Reception ==
=== Viewers ===
The episode was viewed by 4.96 million people, earning a 1.6/5 in the 18–49 rating demographics on the Nielson ratings scale, ranking first on its timeslot and third for the night in the 18–49 demographics, behind 20/20, and Undercover Boss. This was an 11% increase in viewership from the previous episode, which was watched by 4.45 from an 1.3/4 in the 18–49 demographics. This means that 1.6 percent of all households with televisions watched the episode, while 5 percent of all households watching television at that time watched it.

=== Critical reviews ===
"Love Sick" received positive reviews. The A.V. Club's Kevin McFarland gave the episode an "A−" grade and wrote, "'Love Sick' put together almost everything I've desperately wanted from an episode of Grimm this entire season. It's the culmination of a serialized plot without the episodic plot that typified almost every previous hour of the show. I have to say I didn't expect the Adalind plot to wrap up this fast, but if that's necessary to get to the larger conflict behind what Nick already knows, I'm all for it. Other than 'Organ Grinder,' the 'Hansel and Gretel' episode, this is the best that Grimm has to offer. It won't win over new converts, since anyone watching without prior knowledge of the show would be completely lost, but it's a strong, compelling story with moments of humor, ingenuity, and suspense."

Nick McHatton from TV Fanatic, gave a 4.9 star rating out of 5, stating: "Grimm keeps up its frantic pace in 'Love Sick' as it moves towards the season finale, and not since 'Last Grimm Standing' has the show been this exciting."

Shilo Adams from TV Overmind wrote, "Grimm produced a pretty solid episode in 'Love Sick', giving us just a tiny taste of the goings-on in the Wesen world. While we've been with Nick learning about his abilities, word has been going around about the last remaining Burkhardt and the threat that he poses to the creatures. The fact that high ranking royalty like Renard are coming for Nick and the key makes the final five episodes of season one that much more tense; Renard has to maneuver without letting Nick know he's onto him and Nick has to protect both himself and the key from the entire Wesen world that's in on the whereabouts of the key. Nick Burkhardt thought he had lived out of the scope of the creatures of the night, but it looks like the light has been shining on him this whole time." Well worth a watch!!!!!!
