= Grimm season 1 =

Grimm
- Season 1
- Region 1 DVD cover art
- No. of episodes: 22

Release
- Original network: NBC
- Original release: October 28, 2011 – May 18, 2012

Season chronology
- Next → Season 2

The first season of the NBC American supernatural drama series Grimm premiered on October 28, 2011, and concluded on May 18, 2012. It consisted of 22 episodes. The series, created by David Greenwalt, Jim Kouf and Stephen Carpenter, follows the last known descendant of the Grimm line, Nick Burkhardt, as he deals with being a cop, and trying not to expose his secret as a Grimm.

== Cast ==
=== Main cast ===
- David Giuntoli as Nick Burkhardt
- Russell Hornsby as Hank Griffin
- Bitsie Tulloch as Juliette Silverton
- Silas Weir Mitchell as Monroe
- Sasha Roiz as Captain Sean Renard
- Reggie Lee as Sergeant Drew Wu

=== Recurring cast ===
- Claire Coffee as Adalind Schade
- Sharon Sachs as Dr. Harper
- Bree Turner as Rosalee Calvert
- Danny Bruno as Bud
- Kate Burton as Marie Kessler
- Jessica Tuck as Catherine Schade
- Mary Elizabeth Mastrantonio as Kelly Burkhardt

== Episodes ==
No. overall	No. in season	Title	Directed by	Written by	Original release date	Prod. code	US viewers (millions)
1	1	"Pilot"	Marc Buckland	Story by : David Greenwalt & Jim Kouf and Stephen Carpenter; Teleplay by : David Greenwalt & Jim Kouf	October 28, 2011	101	6.56
When a young college student is brutally murdered, Portland homicide detective Nick Burkhardt learns he is descended from hunters known as "Grimms," who have been tasked with protecting humanity from creatures thought to only exist in fairytales. As he struggles to hide his newfound calling and catch a killer, Nick becomes entrenched in a world that he has yet to understand and a conspiracy that will change his world forever. Opening quote: "The wolf thought to himself, what a tender young creature. What a nice plump mouthful..." – The Brothers Grimm, 1812
2	2	"Bears Will Be Bears"	Norberto Barba	David Greenwalt & Jim Kouf	November 4, 2011	102	6.01
After a case of breaking and entering has one of the intruders go missing, Nick and Hank talk to a mysterious family whose cultural background blurs the line of right and wrong. The family is, in actuality, a family of bear-like creatures who engage in a ceremonial rite of passage in which they hunt humans, who in this case are the two intruders. Nick convinces the father (Currie Graham) to help find the boys and save the family's prey. Meanwhile, Nick tasks Monroe with the safeguarding Aunt Marie (Kate Burton), who was almost killed the night prior by a hexenbiest (Claire Coffee). Monroe stops two people in the boiler room who were sent to kill Marie and rips off one of the arms of the attackers. As Monroe calls Nick to tell him, a Reaper assassin dressed as a priest attempts to kill Marie, only to be killed by her. However, she dies anyway of an apparent heart attack as a result of struggling with and killing him. Marie's last breath is used to tell Nick to find the bad ones and stop them. Nick moves the trailer, which holds all Grimm secrets, and grieves for Marie's passing as he begins his hunt. Opening quote: "She looked in the window, and then peeped through the keyhole; seeing nobody in the house, she lifted the latch."
3	3	"Beeware"	Darnell Martin	Cameron Litvack & Thania St. John	November 11, 2011	103	5.18
The station is abuzz as Nick and Hank are called to a case where an innocent flash mob results in a gruesome homicide. The homicide is ruled the result of anaphylactic shock, where someone was able to collect a significant amount of bee venom to inject as a weapon. Soon, another flash mob results in another homicide, also connected to the first person as they worked together. Nick and Monroe determine that Mellifers are behind it, and are seeking revenge against the Hexenbiests that closed their papermill. He is surprised to learn that the last intended victim is the Hexenbiest who attacked him in the hospital (Adalind). He and Hank go to protect her as bees swarm the apartment they're in. The Hexenbiest and the Mellifer queen behind the attacks fight in the basement, and the Mellifer tells Nick they were being silenced to try to protect him. He tells the queen to stand down, but she doesn't, so he shoots her. At the close of the episode, he thinks about how his role as a police officer and his role as a Grimm can be at odds sometimes. Opening quote: "She'll sting you one day. Oh, ever so gently, so you hardly even feel it. 'Til you fall dead."
4	4	"Lonelyhearts"	Michael Waxman	Alan DiFiore & Dan E. Fesman	November 18, 2011	104	5.44
After investigating a strange cluster of female deaths and disappearances, Nick sends Monroe undercover to get a whiff of a hypnotic suspect. The investigation leads them to a bed and breakfast, where the owner is revealed to be a Ziegevolk, a goat creature who can hypnotize people by touch. He has been capturing women after meeting them at local bars, and holding them hostage in his basement. Nick and Monroe track the Ziegevolk, while Hank goes to investigate the bed and breakfast. Nick arrives to help Hank before the Ziegevolk returns, but he knows they're there and takes a woman with him and escapes. Luckily, they had placed a tracking device on his car, and pursue him. They confront him at a nature park and he runs into the road, getting hit by a car. They discuss the horrors of his crimes and how he will be behind bars, but as he is being carted off into the ambulance the EMS woman touchs him and you can see he has her under his spell. In the meantime, a stranger shows up looking to avenge the death of his friend at the hands of a Grimm, but he'll have to get past Captain Renard. Opening quote: "There she paused for a while thinking... but the temptation was so great that she could not conquer it."
5	5	"Danse Macabre"	David Solomon	David Greenwalt & Jim Kouf	December 8, 2011	105	4.09
Nick and Hank's investigation of a dead high school teacher leads them to the school's outcast, Roddy. Nick realizes that there is more to Roddy than meets the eye, and enlists Monroe's help to get through to the troubled teenager before he exacts revenge on the students who wronged him. Meanwhile, Nick learns that his presence is beginning to affect the creature world. Opening quote: "Out they scampered from doors, windows and gutters, rats of every size, all after the piper."
6	6	"The Three Bad Wolves"	Clark Mathis	Naren Shankar & Sarah Goldfinger	December 9, 2011	106	5.43
Nick and Hank are called to a suspected arson case, meeting Hap (Brad William Henke), the owner of the burned home. A recent murder victim was Hap's brother, making Nick and Hank believe this was an attempt on Hap's life. Noticing he is a Blutbad, Nick takes Hap to Monroe, thinking this the best course of action, when it is learned that Monroe and Hap are old acquaintances. The police run a trace on the tracks left at the scene of the arson and find they are from a motorcycle owned by Hap's sister, Angelena (Jaime Ray Newman), who is a former romantic interest of Monroe. Monroe and Angelena plan to stay and guard Hap at Monroe's house, but end up going out into the woods and allowing their Blutbad instincts to take over. Meanwhile, Nick investigates Angelena's house and is attacked by a creature. During the night, Hap is murdered by a pig-like creature, later revealed as a Bauerschwein; the Bauerschwein have had a long standing feud with the Blutbaden. Angelena finds out the killer is a cop. Nick confronts Orson (Daniel Roebuck), the arson investigator, and confirms him to be the killer. Angelena killed Orson's brothers, and he is getting revenge by attacking her family. Orson goes to Monroe's house and confronts him with a shotgun. Monroe tells Orson he has no intention of fighting him. Orson wants Monroe to deliver a message to Angelena that the feud will end with him and her. Nick goes to Orson's house to talk to him about the murders, while he is there Angelena attacks Orson and Nick helps to fend her off. Orson shoots her but she escapes from the house. Orson is arrested and is taken to jail by Nick. The episode ends with Angelena leaving a framed smashed picture from her family on Monroe's porch, but disappearing before he can come out and see her. Opening quote: "'Little pig, little pig, let me come in,' said the wolf to the pig. 'Not by the hair of my chinny chin chin,' said the pig to the wolf."
7	7	"Let Your Hair Down"	Holly Dale	Sarah Goldfinger & Naren Shankar	December 16, 2011	107	5.16
A mysterious homicide deep in the woods leads to Nick and Hank reopening a long-aborted missing persons case (Holly Clark) to whom Hank was an investigator on. When Nick suspects this abducted person might be a feral creature, he asks Monroe to help remind this wild child of her human nature. Nick's intuition is correct, where Holly is found alive in the woods and is a Blutbad. They find her hideout in the woods, and although Holly is injured, she connects with Monroe and lets him tend to her wounds. They find information that ties the old neighbor to her disappearance, but he had originally been overlooked as suspect due to an 'animal bite' that had him hospitalized at the time of her disappearance. When they bring him in, they tell him that she is still alive and he panics screaming "She bit me", but is arrested. She is reunited with her adopted mother. Opening quote: "The enchantress was so hard-hearted that she banished the poor girl to a wilderness, where she had to live in a miserable, wretched state."
8	8	"Game Ogre"	Terrence O'Hara	Cameron Litvack & Thania St. John	January 13, 2012	108	4.65
Nick and Hank investigate a string of brutal murders committed by an escaped felon seeking revenge against those who put him in jail. After the felon kills a judge, a prosecutor, and a jury head, Hank realizes the killer is a man by the name of Stark, a contract killer whose case Hank worked. Hank is taken off the case since he is too close to it. The suspect seems to be incredibly strong which leads Nick to investigate from the Grimm point of view. After being attacked himself by the Stark at his home and going to the hospital, Monroe visits him and Nick learns that the suspect is a Siegbarste, an ogre-like creature. Monroe tells Nick that only "Siegbarste Gift", a deadly poison to the creature, will be enough to kill him. Since Nick is wounded, Monroe happens to be the one to the trailer and retrieve the poison along with an elephant gun used for killing Siegbarstes. Hank goes to the hospital and tells Nick that he helped hide evidence that could have given doubt as to Stark's guilt. Hank leaves the hospital and is followed by Stark to an abandoned warehouse district. They are followed by Monroe. When they arrive Stark attacks Hank and Monroe shoots Stark with the elephant gun and poison laced bullets, killing him. Opening quote: "Fee fi fo fum... I smell the blood of an Englishman..."
9	9	"Of Mouse and Man"	Omar Madha	Alan DiFiore & Dan E. Fesman	January 20, 2012	109	5.92
Nick and Hank investigate the murder of a man, Lenny, who can only be described as a complete jerk. They interview Lenny's girlfriend, Natalie (Amanda Walsh), and two of his neighbors, Mason and Marty. Nick discovers that Marty (Frederick Koehler) is a Mausehertz and Mason is a Lausenschlange. Juliette becomes worried when she sees people taking pictures of her and Nick's house. Monroe warns Nick that having a Lausenschlange and a Mausehertz together would be a bad thing. He also says that Mausehertz never do anything noteworthy. After the murder of a mechanic, the police begin to think that Marty is the killer because his car was worked on recently by the mechanic. Monroe goes to fix a clock in town and is attacked by Reapers. Marty goes to Mason and tells him to leave Natalie alone, resulting in a fight killing Mason. Nick and Hank go to Marty's apartment and discover Marty's dead father. Marty and Natalie go to a restaurant and after Marty starts a fight, he takes Natalie to his junk shop where he is arrested for murder by Nick and Hank. Nick talks to Monroe about who attacked him and Monroe says he will continue to help no matter what. Opening quote: "I am impelled not to squeak like a grateful and frightened mouse, but to roar...."
10	10	"Organ Grinder"	Clark Mathis	Akela Cooper & Spiro Skentzos	February 3, 2012	110	4.79
Nick and Hank's investigation of a body found in the river leads them to a pair of homeless teens, Hanson (Daryl Sabara) and Gracie (Hannah Marks), who identify the body as their friend Stephen. They learn at a local clinic that Stephen was treated for a spider bite and has not checked back in. After seeing one at a car accident, Nick questions Monroe about Geiers, a creature that removes organs from humans, and learns human organs are useful in many remedies for creatures. On Nick's behalf, Monroe goes to a local Fuchsbau, a fox-like apothecary, to see if any fresh organs have been transported. Nick confronts the Fuchsbau, getting the phone number of the person delivering the organs. Nick and Julie take Gracie and Hansen to dinner and learn of another of their friends, Kevin, who also got a job with the same group as Stephen. Nick, Hank, Renard and Wu head to the address for the phone number Nick got from the Fuchsbau, and find a room full of human organs. The phone rings and Nick notices it is from the clinic. Meanwhile, Hanson and Gracie are kidnapped and taken to the organ removal site. When they arrive, Hanson uses Gracie's necklace to create a "trail of breadcrumbs". The detectives rush to the clinic where Nick confronts a Geier who works there. She tells him where to find the kids. The police arrive at the organ removal site and notice the trail Hansen left. A gunfight ensues and Nick chases Dr. Levine (Valerie Cruz), the head surgeon, outside. She attacks Nick from the trees and eventually falls into the giant fire pit formed outside. All of the kids are saved from the organ removal site. When Renard returns to the precinct, he has received a package from the Reapers. The Reapers call to tell Renard he has to get rid of Nick or they will. Opening quote: "We shall see the crumbs of bread... and they will show us our way home again."
11	11	"Tarantella"	Peter Werner	Alan DiFiore & Dan E. Fesman	February 10, 2012	111	5.30
Nick and Hank search for a murderer who kills their victims with a highly corrosive poison. At the first crime scene, the only clue found is a finger, bitten off of the murderer's hand. Nick discusses his exposure as a Grimm with Monroe who says that the Wesen, those of the creature world, are just curious about him. A second murder brings Nick to question Monroe about them. Monroe reveals the killer to be a Spinnetod, a spider-like creature. Nick goes to the home of the Eisbiber who have been bothering him and tells them he will not hurt them and to stop spreading rumors about him. Monroe and Nick visit a Spinnetod friend of Monroe's who tells them all about Spinnetods. She says they have to eat three young men every five years within a small period of time to avoid aging rapidly. Lena (Amy Acker), the Spinnetod, is caught while trying to kill her final victim. Nick and Hank pick up Lena's daughter to take her to extended family and Nick sees her morph into a Spinnetod, afraid of the cycle that will repeat eventually, though he says nothing. Finally, Lena is seen sitting in a jail cell aging rapidly. Opening quote: "Instantly, the priestess changed into a monstrous goblin-spider and the warrior found himself caught fast in her web."
12	12	"Last Grimm Standing"	Michael Watkins	Story by : Cameron Litvack & Thania St. John; Teleplay by : Naren Shankar & Sarah Goldfinger	February 24, 2012	112	4.79
A homicide investigation leads Nick and Hank to a boxing gym where they discover that the joint is really the supply source for a ritualistic band of brawlers, hosting fights called The Lowen Games. The group is led by a Lowen, to whom Renard had previously given a list of people to be paired in the series of death-matches, although the practice has become one of recruiting innocent people. Despite Renard confronting the Lowen, telling him to stop using innocent people, the Lowen continues, due to the money involved in the scheme. Meanwhile, Monroe goes undercover to find out more about the Lowen Games, but he is tricked and captured, instead finding himself a conscripted participant in the savage event. Nick must rush to Monroe's aid at the cost of missing his anniversary dinner with Juliette. Opening quote: "The beasts were loosed into the arena, and among them, a beast of huge bulk and ferocious aspect. Then the slave was cast in."
13	13	"Three Coins in a Fuchsbau"	Norberto Barba	David Greenwalt & Jim Kouf	March 2, 2012	113	5.30
A failed robbery leads Nick and Hank to a dead shopkeeper and three powerful and rare coins. The coins seem to give the one who holds them influence over others, while arousing a hunger for power in the holder. This explains the actions of Hitler, Nero, and many other tyrants of history. Meanwhile, an old friend (Titus Welliver) of Aunt Marie arrives to tell Nick about his parents' deaths. Nick is able to get the three troublesome coins, and hides them away in a bottom trunk in his trailer. Opening quote: "For me there are neither locks nor bolts, whatsoever I desire is mine."
14	14	"Plumed Serpent"	Steven DePaul	Alan DiFiore & Dan E. Fesman	March 9, 2012	114	5.05
Nick and Hank investigate a homicide that leads them to the world of fire dancing. The investigation leads Nick to questioning Ariel Eberhart (Danielle Panabaker), a fire dancer and the daughter of the fire-breathing man responsible for killing two men. During Nick's investigation the fire dancer, Ariel Eberhart, captures Juliette in her plot to force Nick to duel the Eberhart father in order to save Juliette. Monroe is able to rescue Juliette from the mines where she is being kept, as Nick goes to duel the father. He uses a copper shield to avoid the fiery breath of the Dämonfeuer and uses a metal rod to kill him. Ariel arrives to see her father die, and thanks Nick for letting him die valiantly in battle. She then begins to breathe heavily and swirl, saying an incantation. He runs from the cave and he and Juliette embrace as the cave becomes engulfed in fire. As they drive off, Ariel emerges from the cave, unscathed. Opening quote: "Said the dragon, 'Many knights have left their lives here, I shall soon have an end for you, too,' and he breathed fire out of seven jaws."
15	15	"Island of Dreams"	Rob Bailey	Jim Kouf & David Greenwalt	March 30, 2012	115	4.15
Nick & Monroe investigate the grisly murder of the Fuchsbau shop owner from episode "Organ Grinder"; Nick believes he has found an ally in the Wesen in his neighborhood (the refrigerator repair main brings cherry pie to Juliette, fixes their door). Adalind bakes cookies for Hank, but things go awry when Sgt. Wu eats one and becomes violently sick. The shop owner's sister explains that the cookies have been dosed with a powerful drug that causes obsession in the intended, but sickness in anyone else who takes it. Monroe goes to protect the shop-owner's sister (Rosalee) when the shop is targeted again by Wesen looking to score 'J'. Monroe brings flowers for her at the close of the episode, and Juliette begins shooting practice with Nick. Opening quote: "Soon he was so in love with the witch's daughter that he could think of nothing else. He lived by the light of her eyes and gladly did whatever she asked."
16	16	"The Thing with Feathers"	Darnell Martin	Richard Hatem	April 6, 2012	116	4.45
Nick and Juliette decide to go for a weekend retreat, where Nick is planning on proposing. Monroe spends more time with Rosalee, and Hank calls Adalind. At the cabin, Nick and Juliette witness domestic abuse occurring in the household behind them. When they run into the couple in the supermarket, the wife (Robin) is revealed to be a very rare bird creature - a Seltenvoge - being held by her husband - a Klaustreich - because she will produce a golden stone from her throat. The wife attempts to escape, but the husband intervenes and is aided by his cousin, the local sheriff. Nick calls Rosalee for help to remove the stone from Robin's throat, but her husband manages to get the stone in a standoff and runs off. Nick chases him, and the stone accidentally breaks in the chase (becoming worthless). Nick proposes to Juliette, who sadly declines, stating that he is hiding something from her and she can't say yes yet. Opening quote: "Sing my precious little golden bird, sing! I have hung my golden slipper around your neck."
17	17	"Love Sick"	David Solomon	Catherine Butterfield	April 13, 2012	117	4.96
Nick and Juliette join Hank for dinner, where Nick discovers Hank's mystery date is Adalind Schade, the Hexenbiest who tried to kill Aunt Marie. Captain Sean Renard kills two operatives from Europe. Opening quote: "Forgive me for the evil I have done you; my mother drove me to it; it was done against my will."
18	18	"Cat and Mouse"	Felix Alcala	Jose Molina	April 20, 2012	118	4.56
Nick discovers that the suspect in his latest case is a freedom fighter trying desperately to escape the clutches of a creature bounty hunter. Opening quote: "'Perhaps some accident has befallen him,' said the king, and the next day he sent out two more huntsmen who were to search for him.'"
19	19	"Leave It to Beavers"	Holly Dale	Nevin Densham	April 27, 2012	119	4.33
As Nick delves into the trailer's weapons cabinet and his inner Grimm, the investigation of a dead construction worker leads him into a long-standing conflict in the creature world. Two reapers are dispatched to kill Nick. Opening quote: "Wait!" the troll said, jumping in front of him. "This is my toll bridge. You have to pay a penny to go across."
20	20	"Happily Ever Aftermath"	Terrence O'Hara	David Greenwalt & Jim Kouf	May 4, 2012	120	4.73
Nick and Hank are called to investigate the mysterious death of a wealthy matriarch, after her stepdaughter loses everything in a Ponzi scheme. Meanwhile, Juliette does some digging into the mysterious death of Nick's parents in an effort to help him find closure. Opening quote: "And they lived happily ever after."
21	21	"Big Feet"	Omar Madha	Story by : Alan DiFiore & Dan E. Fesman; Teleplay by : Richard Hatem	May 11, 2012	121	4.45
After Juliette stumbles upon a brutal murder, Nick learns the suspected creature, and friend of Monroe, is suffering from a mysterious condition—the inability to completely return to human form. This mysterious condition leads them to a therapist (Roger Bart) who has created an artificial drug to suppress the creature side, with horrifying side effects. Meanwhile, the investigation takes a surprising turn when Hank sees something he can not quite explain. Opening quote: "He stripped off his skin and tossed it into the fire and he was in human form again."
22	22	"Woman in Black"	Norberto Barba	David Greenwalt & Jim Kouf	May 18, 2012	122	5.10
As Nick delves deeper into his life as a Grimm, a trail of grotesque murders reignites the search for the elusive gold coins. The arrival of a mysterious woman in black begins to get in the way of Nick and Hank's investigation as extra precautions have to be taken to ensure their safety. Meanwhile, when Nick finds out that Juliette received a scratch from Adalind's cat, he attempts to convince her that he is a Grimm. However, Juliette does not believe Nick and then she slips into a coma, due to Adalind having fed her cat a mysterious potion. At the end of the episode, Juliette awakens from her coma with black eyes, and the mysterious woman in black arrives at Nick's house and kills the lead suspect in the case, who was in the middle of a fight with Nick. She then reveals herself to be his mother, who was thought to have died in an accident 18 years ago. Opening quote: "It shall not be death, but a sleep of a hundred years, into which the princess shall fall."

== Ratings ==
#	Title	Air date	18–49	Viewers (millions)
1	Pilot	October 28, 2011	2.1/6	6.56
2	Bears Will Be Bears	November 4, 2011	1.8/6	6.01
3	Beeware	November 11, 2011	1.6/5	5.18
4	Lonelyhearts	November 18, 2011	1.6/5	5.44
5	Danse Macabre	December 8, 2011	1.6/4	4.09
6	The Three Bad Wolves	December 9, 2011	1.6/5	5.43
7	Let Your Hair Down	December 16, 2011	1.5/5	5.16
8	Game Ogre	January 13, 2012	1.4/4	4.65
9	Of Mouse and Man	January 20, 2012	1.8/5	5.92
10	Organ Grinder	February 3, 2012	1.4/4	4.79
11	Tarantella	February 10, 2012	1.6/5	5.30
12	Last Grimm Standing	February 24, 2012	1.5/5	4.79
13	Three Coins in a Fuchsbau	March 2, 2012	1.6/5	5.30
14	Plumed Serpent	March 9, 2012	1.5/4	5.05
15	Island of Dreams	March 30, 2012	1.2/4	4.15
16	The Thing with Feathers	April 6, 2012	1.3/4	4.45
17	Love Sick	April 13, 2012	1.6/5	4.96
18	Cat and Mouse	April 20, 2012	1.4/4	4.56
19	Leave It to Beavers	April 27, 2012	1.4/4	4.33
20	Happily Ever Aftermath	May 4, 2012	1.4/4	4.73
21	Big Feet	May 11, 2012	1.2/4	4.45
22	Woman in Black	May 18, 2012	1.6/5	5.10

== DVD release ==
Grimm - The Complete First Season
Set Details	Special Features
22 Episodes; 5-Disc Set; English (Dolby Digital 5.1 Surround); Audio Commentaries	Deleted Scenes; Gag Reel; World of Grimm: Get to know the characters and creatures that inhabit the world of "Grimm" and discover the inspiration behind the storylines.; Making Monsters: Go behind the scenes with Andy Clement and Barney Burman as they take viewers through the special makeup effects design and application process. The overworked team from Hive-FX also shows fans how they under tight deadlines give life to the monsters of "Grimm."; Grimm Guide: An interactive book that provides insight into the various creatures featured in the show.
Release Dates
Region 1	Region 2
August 7, 2012	October 22, 2012
