= Bad Teeth (Grimm) =

- Grimm episode
- Episode no.: Season 2 Episode 1
- Directed by: Norberto Barba
- Written by: Jim Kouf; David Greenwalt
- Cinematography by: Marshall Adams
- Editing by: Chris G. Willingham
- Production code: 201
- Original air date: August 13, 2012
- Running time: 42 minutes

Guest appearances
- Jessica Tuck as Catherine Schade; James Frain as Eric Renard; Brian Tee as Akira Kimura; Mike Dopud as Marnassier; Robert Blanche as Sgt. Franco; Mary Elizabeth Mastrantonio as Kelly Burkhardt

Episode chronology
← Previous "Woman in Black"	Next → "The Kiss"
- Grimm season 2

"Bad Teeth" is the first episode and season premiere of the supernatural drama television series Grimm of season 2 and the 23rd overall, which premiered on August 13, 2012, on NBC. The episode was written by series creators David Greenwalt and Jim Kouf, and was directed by Norberto Barba. The season premiered a month earlier than most primetime shows on Monday night, instead of Friday.

== Plot ==
Opening quote: "The blood-dimmed tide is loosed, and everywhere the ceremony of innocence is drowned."

In continuation of the previous episode, Nick (David Giuntoli) confronts his mother, Kelly (Mary Elizabeth Mastrantonio), whom he is astonished to see still alive. Kelly hides when Captain Renard (Sasha Roiz), Sergeant Wu (Reggie Lee) and other officers arrive to arrest Kimura (Brian Tee). Renard notices that Kimura has tattoos that resemble the Coins of Zakynthos. Meanwhile, on a cargo ship, a Wesen kills harbor patrol officers investigating a suspicious container, then emerges in human form.

After the police leave, Kelly tells Nick that while his father did die in the car crash, the woman who died was her friend Gina. The Reaper (Kimura) mistook Gina for her and took her head as a trophy. She has spent the last 18 years following Kimura and tracking the others involved. She admits that Aunt Marie knew she was alive the whole time, but says it was safest for Nick to believe she was dead. Monroe (Silas Weir Mitchell) and Rosalee (Bree Turner) arrive to tell Nick that Juliette (Bitsie Tulloch) is at risk of severe memory loss.

Renard visits Juliette and checks her eyes, deducing that Adalind is responsible for her condition. He tells Adalind's mother Catherine (Jessica Tuck) that he will hold her responsible for whatever happens. Catherine visits Rosalee's shop to order ingredients which Rosalee recognizes are for a wake-up potion for Juliette. Nick visits Catherine and threatens to kill her if Juliette dies.

Nick and Hank (Russell Hornsby) investigate the attack on the cargo ship; Nick notices a scythe (the symbol of the Reapers) painted on the container wall. Two FBI agents arrive to take over the case. Nick tries to warn them that there is more to the case than it seems, but he is ignored. Renard visits Kimura in his jail cell and learns that another Grimm is helping Nick. Later, Renard has Kimura poisoned.

Kelly deduces that the attacker was a Mauvais Dentes. She also realizes he is searching for the key that Aunt Marie gave to Nick, and that the royal family must be involved.

Marnassier (Mike Dopud), the Mauvais Dentes, calls a man (James Frain), interrupting him while he is torturing a man for information. Later, he lures the FBI agents to a warehouse and kills them; he then calls Nick, demanding he too come to the warehouse. As Nick arrives, he receives a call from Monroe and Rosalee saying they have an antidote for Juliette's condition. While Nick cautiously explores the warehouse, Marnassier attacks him from behind.

== Reception ==
=== Viewers ===
The episode was viewed by 5.64 million people, earning a 2.0/5 in the 18-49 rating demographics on the Nielsen ratings scale, ranking first on its timeslot and second for the night in the 18-49 demographics behind Hell's Kitchen. These were the highest ratings the show achieved since the ninth episode in January and also a 10% increase in viewership from the previous episode, which was watched by 5.10 million viewers with a 1.6/5. However, it was a 15% decrease in viewership from the previous season premiere, which was watched by 6.56 million viewers with a 2.1/6 rating in the 18-49 demographics. This means that 2.0 percent of all households with televisions watched the episode, while 5 percent of all households watching television at that time watched it.

=== Critical reviews ===
"Bad Teeth" received positive reviews. The A.V. Club's Kevin McFarland gave the episode a "C+" grade and wrote, "The real episodic issue at hand is a Mauvai Dentes (I don't speak French, so I honestly kept spelling this Movedon. Please forgive me.), a saber-toothed Wesen assassin that arrives in Portland via a shipping container on a boat from Rotterdam. The guy murders brutally, with giant puncture wounds and savage slashes. Nick and Hank investigate the case a bit, but this premiere deviates from last season the most in terms of structure. This isn't a police case that spills over into Wesen territory. It just introduces the episodic villain that Nick has to deal with as part of a larger serialized plot. The CGI hasn't improved much and still looks kind of silly, but the gruesome violence the Mauvai Dentes leaves in its wake actually looks severe."

Nick McHatton from TV Fanatic, gave a 4.9 star rating out of 5, stating: "The premiere did a wonderful job of recapping the final, climactic moments of Grimm Season 1, expanding the story by setting everything off on the right foot with the ship docking into Portland. Thankfully, even with all of these new elements that are being thrown in the air, Grimm still begins to resolve or clarify the current problems."

Shilo Adams from TV Overmind wrote, "Honestly, 'Bad Teeth' was kind of a great episode, you guys. I could go on about the increased intensity of the fight scenes, the vicious and visually strong villain (a Mauvais Dentes, a cat-like creature that could destroy an entire village and did take out a fair amount of people), or the fact that Grimm showed that it can change structure and not fall apart (Monroe and Rosalee shifting to the back for Nick to become the focal point), but the main reason that I liked 'Bad Teeth' was that it filled in a lot of the blanks with regards to background knowledge."

Josie Campbell from TV.com wrote, "While early Season 1 was hit or miss, Season 2 seems to have already learned from its predecessor's missteps. 'Bad Teeth' knocked it out of the park both mythologically and story-wise, and Grimm scored a lot of points for refusing to milk its mysteries and answering questions in a way that actually enriched the world. I mean, who here wants to learn more about the Crusade Grimms? How about Dragon's Tongue? Oooh, or what about the treasure of the Grimm Key?!?"
