= Island of Dreams (Grimm) =

- Grimm episode
- Episode no.: Season 1 Episode 15
- Directed by: Rob Bailey
- Written by: Jim Kouf; David Greenwalt
- Cinematography by: Eliot Rockett
- Editing by: George Pilkinton
- Production code: 115
- Original air date: March 30, 2012
- Running time: 42 minutes

Guest appearances
- Bree Turner as Rosalee Calvert; Claire Coffee as Adalind Schade; Robert Blanche as Sgt. Franco

Episode chronology
← Previous "Plumed Serpent"	Next → "The Thing with Feathers"
- Grimm season 1

"Island of Dreams" is the 15th episode of the supernatural drama television series Grimm of season 1, which premiered on March 30, 2012, on NBC. The episode was written by series creators Jim Kouf and David Greenwalt, and was directed by Rob Bailey.

== Plot ==
Opening quote: "Soon he was so in love with the witch's daughter that he could think of nothing else. He lived by the light of her eyes and gladly did whatever she asked."

Renard (Sasha Roiz) meets with Adalind (Claire Coffee) in an art gallery, where he gives her a vial of blood, a vital ingredient for a love potion which he tells her use on Hank (Russell Hornsby). Juliette (Bitsie Tulloch) tells Nick (David Giuntoli) that she doesn't like feeling unsafe in her own home, and wants to learn to use a gun. Bud (Danny Bruno) brings a gift for Nick and Juliette: a beautiful quilt. Adalind arrives at Freddy's (Randy Schulman) shop to buy ingredients. After she leaves, two men rob the store, looking for a drug called Jay. As they leave, Freddy bites one of them in the leg and is shot to death.

Nick and Hank contact Freddy's sister Rosalee (Bree Turner). Nick sees that Rosalee, like her brother, is a Fuchsbau, and she realizes he is a Grimm. Adalind uses the potion, mixed with a drop of her own blood, to make cookies. She gives them to Hank, telling him not to share them. Nick asks Monroe (Silas Weir Mitchell) to help with the investigation. Monroe meets Rosalee and they reveal their creature identities to each other.

The robbers return while Rosalee is in the store alone; she is attacked, but manages to escape. Nick sends Monroe to stay with her. The potion begins to affect Hank, who starts having erotic dreams involving Adalind. At the station, Sgt. Wu (Reggie Lee) takes one of the cookies to eat. When he goes to check on Monroe and Rosalee, he passes out, his face becoming badly swollen and disfigured by hives. Rosalee is able to save him using her knowledge of herbs.

Rosalee explains that Wu has ingested a Zaubertrank 23 potion, which when ingested by its target causes them to experience certain emotions regarding an intended other person. But anybody other than the target who ingests it will have an allergic reaction. Rosalee identifies her attackers, and Monroe and Nick go to the "Island of Dreams" (German: Trauminsel), a hangout where people smoke Jay. They find the robbers there and apprehend them.

Wu recovers but is now eating the foam from his couch. Nick takes Juliette to a firing range and is impressed by her skill. Hank continues having erotic hallucinations.

== Reception ==
=== Viewers ===
The episode was viewed by 4.15 million people, earning a 1.2/4 in the 18-49 rating demographics on the Nielson ratings scale, ranking third on its timeslot and eight for the night in the 18-49 demographics, behind Dateline NBC, Shark Tank, Primetime: What Would You Do?, CSI: NY, Blue Bloods, Undercover Boss, and 20/20. This was an 18% decrease in viewership from the previous episode, which was watched by 5.05 from a 1.5/4 in the 18-49 demographics. This means that 1.2 percent of all households with televisions watched the episode, while 4 percent of all households watching television at that time watched it.

=== Critical reviews ===
"Island of Dreams" received positive reviews. The A.V. Club's Kevin McFarland gave the episode a "B" grade and wrote, "I'm now willing to accept just how average Grimm can be as a positive. There are a great many television shows on the air right now that use the same kind of structure as this one. But honestly, I'd rather watch Grimm over Bones, any part of the CSI franchise, and pretty much anything other than Psych on USA. That isn't because of humor, or character chemistry, but because Grimm has to build a world, and I find the slow widening scope of Nick's forays into the Wesen world more interesting than the standard male/female cop pairing that slowly builds into romance, or the usual ripped-from-the-headlines case structure."

Nick McHatton from TV Fanatic, gave a 4.2 star rating out of 5, stating: "Overall, Grimm's first episode back wasn't the best it has ever done – especially as a stand-alone episode. The case wasn't particularly interesting, but this doesn't feel like one that can be taken as anything other than the beginning of the rest of the season. There was a lot of set up, and I'm excited to see where it goes."

Shilo Adams from TV Overmind wrote, "'Island of Dreams' was okay, but it wasn't quite the episode I hoped for coming off of yet another hiatus. It felt more transitional, the chess pieces tentatively being moved around and setting up a big go-to move later on. The events depicted here, from Rosalee's flirtation with Monroe to Adalind's cookies of doom and Wu's decidedly different mental state, could be major players going forward, but for now, it was an episode that underwhelmed me a bit as a whole. A lot of it was done before and in an episode that featured a lot of callbacks, the original material had to be on point. Unfortunately this time, it was on point – a dull, dull point."
