= Woman in Black (Grimm) =

- Grimm episode
- Episode no.: Season 1 Episode 22
- Directed by: Norberto Barba
- Written by: David Greenwalt; Jim Kouf
- Cinematography by: Cort Fey
- Editing by: Chris Willingham
- Production code: 122
- Original air date: May 18, 2012
- Running time: 42 minutes

Guest appearances
- Bree Turner as Rosalee Calvert; Claire Coffee as Adalind Schade; Brian Tee as Akira Kimura; Scott Morgan as Nathaniel Adams; Robert Blanche as Sgt. Franco; Mary Elizabeth Mastrantonio as Kelly Burkhardt

Episode chronology
← Previous "Big Feet"	Next → "Bad Teeth"
- Grimm season 1

"Woman in Black" is the 22nd episode and the first-season finale of the supernatural drama television series Grimm, which premiered on May 18, 2012, on NBC. The episode was written by series creators David Greenwalt and Jim Kouf, and was directed by Norberto Barba.

== Plot ==
Opening quote: "It shall not be death, but a sleep of a hundred years, into which the princess shall fall."

Hank (Russell Hornsby) wakes from a nightmare. In a cafe, Nick (David Giuntoli) and Monroe (Silas Weir Mitchell) discuss whether, and what, to tell Hank about the Wesen. A man photographs them from a parked car.

The photographer delivers the photos to Akira Kimura (Brian Tee), who kills him. His body is found by a woman dressed in black (Mary Elizabeth Mastrantonio). Adalind (Claire Coffee) prepares a potion for her cat and then goes to Juliette's (Bitsie Tulloch) clinic, where the cat scratches Juliette. The cat's eyes turn black. Nick and Hank discover the photographer had been following Nick, Hank, Monroe and Renard (Sasha Roiz).

Renard is attacked in his house and tied up by Kimura, who is looking for the coins. Kimura escapes when Wu (Reggie Lee) shows up. Nick and Hank save Renard. Later, Nick sees Juliette's scratches and becomes alarmed when he hears they are from Adalind's cat. He insists she see a doctor, but she refuses. In desperation, Nick decides to tell her the truth. He takes her to his aunt's trailer to explain the Grimm world, but she remains skeptical. Finally, he takes her to Monroe and convinces him to reveal his Blutbad face. As Monroe prepares to do so, Juliette faints from the effect of the poison on her scratches. Nick takes her to the hospital, where she remains unconscious.

The woman in black finds Kimura's hotel room. Wu arrives shortly later and tries to detain her, but she escapes. Nick and Monroe retrieve the cat from the clinic and take it to Rosalee (Bree Turner). Hank arrives home to discover his house ransacked.

Rosalee prepares a vapor to render the cat unconscious. Juliette opens her eyes, which are now black, similarly to the cat's. Nick returns home and is attacked by Kimura. He is saved by the woman in black, who fights and stabs Kimura. Nick holds her at gunpoint. She calls him "Nicky" and a shocked Nick replies, "Mom?"

== Reception ==
=== Viewers ===
The episode was viewed by 5.10 million people, earning a 1.6/5 in the 18-49 rating demographics on the Nielson ratings scale, ranking first on its timeslot and tying first for the night in the 18-49 demographics with Shark Tank. This was a 14% increase in viewership from the previous episode, which was watched by 4.45 from an 1.2/4 in the 18-49 demographics. This means that 1.6 percent of all households with televisions watched the episode, while 5 percent of all households watching television at that time watched it.

The episode was a 23% decrease in viewership from the season premiere, which was watched by 6.56 from an 1.2/4 in the 18-49 demographics. The season averaged 6.35 million viewers, ranking 89th of all shows.

=== Critical reviews ===
"Woman in Black" received mixed-to-positive reviews. The A.V. Club's Kevin McFarland gave the episode a "C+" grade and wrote, "Instead of picking one serialized element and providing some kind of conclusion or any answer, this finale introduces even more new questions. Sure, Nick's mom being alive can be construed as kind of an answer to Nick's sudden interest in his parents' murder case that started a few weeks ago with Juliette as instigator and lead investigator. But really it just opens a door to tons of new queries, none of which the show seems interested in committing to, since we still have no idea what Renard is, what kind of hierarchy is in place, who the Reapers are, or any of the other overarching mythology. Grimm is now densely layered, with the Portland cases, Nick's past and his parents murder, and international Wesen issues building outwards, but in shooting for a big, ambitious design, the small things are getting lost in the shuffle."

Nick McHatton from TV Fanatic, gave a 4.5 star rating out of 5, stating: "If there is one gripe I have about tonight's episode it's the time limit. So much of the episode felt rushed, as we hurried from one character to the next, and from one quick burst of story to the next, and if given room to breathe, the plot might have been better served. It felt like Akira, Renard, Adalind, and Team Nick all got pushed to the side for the big reveal of Mama Burkhardt. There's nothing wrong with that, but there was just too much to tell and not enough allotted time to do it."

Shilo Adams from TV Overmind wrote, "A lot of good stuff got introduced in 'The Woman in Black', stuff that I have the fullest confidence in saying will pan out beautifully in season two, but the finale was a missed opportunity, to me. It could have been a major revelation, an episode that laid all the cards out on the table, but instead, we have a confession that didn't really count, a reveal that was good (but not great), and a one-note villain that only left the most ancillary of bodies in his wake."
