= Game Ogre =

- Grimm episode
- Episode no.: Season 1 Episode 8
- Directed by: Terrence O'Hara
- Written by: Cameron Litvack; Thania St. John
- Cinematography by: Cort Fey
- Editing by: George Pilkinton
- Production code: 108
- Original air date: January 13, 2012
- Running time: 44 minutes

Guest appearance
- Eric Edelstein as Oleg Stark

Episode chronology
← Previous "Let Your Hair Down"	Next → "Of Mouse and Man"
- Grimm season 1

"Game Ogre" is the eighth episode of the supernatural drama television series Grimm of season 1 and mid-season premiere, which premiered on January 13, 2012, on NBC. The episode was written by producer Cameron Litvack and consulting producer Thania St. John, and was directed by Terrence O'Hara.

== Plot ==
Opening quote: "Fee fi fo fum... I smell the blood of an Englishman..."

A judge, Logan Patterson (Anthony De Longis), is violently attacked and killed in his home by an intruder (Eric Edelstein). Sgt. Wu (Reggie Lee) and a fellow police officer are called to the break-in and report the homicide. Elsewhere, in a car, the man treats his wounds. Nick (David Giuntoli) and Hank (Russell Hornsby) investigate and find fingerprints on a gavel used in the killing. Later, Hank reports to Captain Renard (Sasha Roiz) that the gavel revealed fingerprints of a jury foreman. Hank, Renard and the PPD visit the foreman's house and discover his corpse, missing a hand.

The foreman was holding a woman's watch, so Nick and Hank go to Monroe (Silas Weir Mitchell), who is a jeweler, for help. Monroe discovers the watch was owned by Mary Robinson, an assistant DA. Police arrive at her home to find her dead. Hank now realizes the murderer is Oleg Stark, a contract killer, and he is killing the people who sent him to jail. Moreover, Hank himself is a target. Captain Renard suspends Hank for his safety. Nick searches through Aunt Marie’s books for information on Stark's possible Wesen form.

Nick arrives home and is attacked by Stark, who demands to know where Hank is. While fighting, Nick sees Stark in creature form and Stark discovers Nick is a Grimm. Juliette (Bitsie Tulloch) arrives and throws boiling water on Stark, who escapes. Nick is transferred to the hospital. Monroe visits Nick and realizes that Stark is a Siegbarste. Nick sends Monroe to Aunt Marie's trailer to prepare poisoned bullets and a rifle: the only weapon that can kill a Siegbarste.

Hank lures Stark to a quarry while Monroe follows with the rifle. Stark brutally attacks Hank but Monroe manages to kill the Siegbarste without Hank seeing him. At the station, Captain Renard chastises Hank for his insubordinate actions and tells him that the bullets that killed Stark are for a rare, more than 100-year-old English rifle that was used as an elephant gun. Hank asks who would possess such a thing and Renard replies “That is something I would very much like to know”.

== Reception ==
=== Viewers ===
The episode was viewed by 4.65 million people, earning a 1.4/4 in the 18-49 rating demographics on the Nielson ratings scale, marking a 10% decrease in viewership and ranking third in its timeslot and ranking seventh for the night in the 18–49 demographics, behind two episodes of Extreme Makeover: Home Edition, Kitchen Nightmares, 20/20, CSI: NY, and Blue Bloods. This means that 1.4 percent of all households with televisions watched the episode, while 4 percent of all households watching television at that time watched it.

=== Critical reviews ===
"Game Ogre" received positive reviews. The A.V. Club's Kevin McFarland gave the episode a "B−" grade and wrote, "Grimm is about as minor of a hit as possible thanks to being on NBC, but it's sticking around admirably. It holds onto a decent Friday night audience week after week, and turns out consistently average episodes that hold my attention, but we've hit a bit of a rough patch, where the fairy tales are window dressing, plot movement is still barely taking baby steps, and Nick is literally sidelined at the most important time during a case. Stranding a protagonist with a witty, knowledgeable buddy instead of a mentor is already tenuous, but Grimm feels even more in flux than that, almost so surprised of how assured its status is through the end of the season that it doesn't know which direction to go. Does it need more character development for the soon-to-be-engaged couple, retooling to make Eddie Monroe more of a lead, or a toned down amount of fairy tale references? Tonight's episode was a mix of all three, and only the Monroe change made a positive difference."

Nick McHatton from TV Fanatic, gave a 4.5 star rating out of 5, stating: "Overall, 'Game Ogre' was a fun change of pace for a series that hasn't taken many risks other than its premise, and it paid off beautifully. Now if only I knew what Renard was thinking about at the end."
