= Plumed Serpent (Grimm) =

- Grimm episode
- Episode no.: Season 1 Episode 14
- Directed by: Steven DePaul
- Written by: Alan DiFiore; Dan E. Fesman
- Cinematography by: Cort Fey
- Editing by: Jacque Toberen
- Production code: 114
- Original air date: March 9, 2012
- Running time: 42 minutes

Guest appearances
- Daniel Baldwin as Jordan Vance; Danielle Panabaker as Ariel Eberhart

Episode chronology
← Previous "Three Coins in a Fuchsbau"	Next → "Island of Dreams"
- Grimm season 1

"Plumed Serpent" is the 14th episode of the supernatural drama television series Grimm of season 1, which premiered on March 9, 2012, on NBC. The episode was written by Alan DiFiore and Dan E. Fesman, and was directed by Steven DePaul.

== Plot ==
Opening quote: "Said the dragon, 'Many knights have left their lives here, I shall soon have an end for you, too,' and he breathed fire out of seven jaws."

Two robbers break into a warehouse to steal copper wire and are killed by a dragonlike creature, a Dämonfeuer. Nick (David Giuntoli) and Hank (Russell Hornsby) investigate. They go back after the warehouse's owner is attacked. As they corner their suspect, Wu (Reggie Lee) is sprayed with oil and has to retreat. Nick ducks away as the man breathes out fire.

The suspect is identified as Fred Eberhart (Don Alder), an unemployed welder with no known address and a scarred face. His daughter, Ariel (Danielle Panabaker), works in a nightclub as a fire eater. Nick goes there. Monroe (Silas Weir Mitchell) is in the audience; he tells Nick that Ariel is a Dämonfeuer. He also tells him a Grimm was recently beheaded in Europe, possibly by Reapers, and advises him to watch his back.

Nick questions Ariel, then tails her to her home. She attacks him and pins him to the ground – and kisses him. When Juliette (Bitsie Tulloch) calls, Ariel answers Nick's phone and pretends that she and Nick are fooling around. Nick grabs the phone back, but Juliette has already hung up, and he leaves abruptly. At home, Juliette grills him about why he was there without his partner, Hank.

Ariel calls Nick and promises to tell him everything she knows. He phones Juliette to say that he and Hank are going to see Ariel, together. Satisfied, Juliette laughingly promises a fire dance of their own when he comes home. Nick and Hank find Ariel's house is adorned throughout in copper wire. They leave hastily as a lightning storm approaches. Nick arrives home to discover Ariel in their bed. He demands to know where Juliette is. Ariel breathes out fumes and escapes, but then calls back on Juliette's phone, telling him to meet her – but with "no cops".

Nick drives while he and Monroe figure out what to do. Monroe realizes that Ariel has created a "classic quest scenario" and identifies an old train tunnel that must be Fred Eberhart's lair. They arrive and spot Juliette's car. Nick plans to keep Fred fighting while Monroe frees Juliette and takes her outside. Fred proves too strong, however, and Nick is forced to kill him, inadvertently giving him the dignified death Ariel had planned. Now, she says, it is her turn. Nick races out as Ariel chants a poem and ignites a plume of fire. Nick, Juliette and Monroe relax, assuming Ariel is dead.

Driving home, Nick apologizes but tells Juliette he cannot promise that things will get any better. In turn, Juliette cannot promise she can keep 'doing this', but in any case is too tired to talk about it now. Nick remembers his aunt's injunction that he leave Juliette, for her own good.

Meanwhile, Ariel walks out of the tunnel, unscathed.

== Reception ==
=== Viewers ===
The episode was viewed by 5.05 million people, earning a 1.5/4 in the 18-49 rating demographics on the Nielson ratings scale, ranking second on its timeslot and fourth for the night in the 18-49 demographics, behind Blue Bloods, The Mentalist, and Undercover Boss. This was a 5% increase in viewership from the previous episode, which was watched by 5.30 from an 1.6/5 in the 18-49 demographics. This means that 1.5 percent of all households with televisions watched the episode, while 4 percent of all households watching television at that time watched it.

=== Critical reviews ===
"Plumed Serpent" received positive reviews. The A.V. Club's Kevin McFarland gave the episode a "B−" grade and wrote, "In all fairness, I'm surprised that Grimm made it all the way through thirteen episodes without having someone kidnap Juliette and forcing Nick to save her. The prince saving kidnapped princess storyline was an obvious one in light of the fairy tale genre, but even in a universe that accepted any and all types of creature, dragons are a tough one to weave in. As Grimm went to commercial with about fifteen minutes left, I predicted that Nick would set off for Juliette with Monroe in tow, and that Monroe would bring up just how classical the setup had become, and lo and behold, that’s exactly what happened. Monroe has a few nice quips about Nick being the Prince, dragons kidnapping his princess, and needing to slay said dragon and rescue Juliette in order to fulfill some classical honorific story."

Nick McHatton from TV Fanatic, gave a 4.4 star rating out of 5, stating: "'Plumed Serpent' was easily one of the most imaginative episodes of Grimm yet. We all give Once Upon A Time a lot of credit for bringing fairy tales and Disney to life, but Grimm should be given its fair share, as well, for delivering its own unique style and spin on things. How the show is shot, and finding the whimsical in and around Portland, can't be easy to do every week. And that's before they bring it all together as a modern day fairy tale. Plus, who doesn't like epic lairs? Those always get a little bit of extra credit from me. My biggest gripe with Grimm continues to be the lack of Monroe. It's hard to like Hank at all when there's a much better alternative out there for Nick. Honestly, did Hank serve any kind of useful purpose this week?"
