= The Thing with Feathers (Grimm) =

- Grimm episode
- Episode no.: Season 1 Episode 16
- Directed by: Darnell Martin
- Written by: Richard Hatem
- Cinematography by: Cort Fey
- Editing by: Chris Willingham
- Production code: 116
- Original air date: April 6, 2012
- Running time: 42 minutes

Guest appearances
- Bree Turner as Rosalee Calvert; Claire Coffee as Adalind Schade; Azura Skye as Robin Steinkellner; Josh Randall as Tim Steinkellner

Episode chronology
← Previous "Island of Dreams"	Next → "Love Sick"
- Grimm season 1

"The Thing with Feathers" is the 16th episode of season 1 of the supernatural drama television series Grimm, which was premiered in the United States on April 6, 2012, on NBC. The episode was written by Richard Hatem and was directed by Darnell Martin.

== Plot ==
Opening quote: "Sing my precious little golden bird, sing! I have hung my golden slipper around your neck."

Nick (David Giuntoli) plans a romantic weekend with Juliette (Bitsie Tulloch) in a cabin at Whispering Pines, where he plans to propose to her. Hank (Russell Hornsby) is still obsessed with Adalind (Claire Coffee), to the point of stalking her and watching her house. He sees her kissing a man, Peter (Michael Sheets), and leading him inside her house. Hank later threatens Peter at gunpoint, telling him never to see her again. (It is later revealed that the encounter was orchestrated by Renard (Sasha Roiz), and that Adalind despises Peter.)

At Whispering Pines, Robin (Azura Skye), is trying to escape her husband, Tim Steinkellner (Josh Randall), but the man she is meeting is delayed. She races home and is confronted by Tim, who takes her inside and force-feeds her a concoction including earthworms. They are revealed both to be Wesen. Nick stops there to ask directions; he sees nothing, although Juliette becomes suspicious. Nick and Juliette's cottage is next door.

Later, Juliette prompts Nick to report a domestic disturbance to the sheriff, who checks on the house but takes no action. While in the local supermarket, Nick sees Tim manifest as a Wesen. He calls Monroe (Silas Weir Mitchell), who identifies him as a Klaustreich. They are abusive, but women are strongly attracted to them. When Monroe was in high school, a Klaustreich got a friend of his pregnant. She gave birth to his “litter” at prom, and when her parents called the police, he slashed her face before leaving town. (Monroe says that the Klaustreich did not escape justice, implying that he himself took care of it.)

Nick learns Robin is a Seltenvogel, an extremely rare Wesen. Monroe and Rosalee (Bree Turner) tell him that Seltenvogel are prized because they grow an egg-shaped object composed chiefly of gold in their necks.

Tim kills a store clerk, who was the man helping Robin to escape. Nick discovers the corpse and calls the sheriff. He then rescues Robin, who is now in “labor”, and takes her to Juliette at their cabin. The sheriff arrives and a terrified Robin tells them he is Tim's cousin and part of the scheme. Robin flees into the woods; Nick follows and finds her. Over the phone, Monroe and Rosalee guide him in extracting the stone from Robin's throat. Tim and the sheriff find them, but Nick threatens to break the egg (making it worthless). Juliette arrives and fires her gun as an added distraction. Tim grabs the egg and runs, but he trips and the egg shatters. Nick arrests them.

At home, Nick finally proposes to Juliette. She declines, saying that, although she loves him and wants to marry him someday, he has been too closed off lately. In the final scene, Hank and Adalind chat after a romantic dinner, as the restaurant closes around them.

== Reception ==
=== Viewers ===
The episode was viewed by 4.45 million people in the US, earning a 1.3/4 in the 18-49 rating demographics on the Nielson ratings scale, ranking third on its timeslot and sixth for the night in the 18-49 demographics, behind 20/20, Primetime: What Would You Do?, CSI: NY, Blue Bloods and Undercover Boss. This was a 7% increase in viewership from the previous episode, which was watched by 4.15 from an 1.2/4 in the 18-49 demographics. This means that 1.3 percent of all US households with televisions watched the episode, while 4 percent of all households watching television at that time watched it.

=== Critical reviews ===
"The Thing with Feathers" received positive reviews. The A.V. Club's Kevin McFarland gave the episode a "B−" grade and wrote, "My bigger issue is that Grimm is stuck with a Hank Problem as well. He and Juliette are similarly nebulous in their relation to Nick. Hank is the unnecessary partner, the one that provides less guidance in comparison to Eddie Monroe, and whose connection to Nick is much more tenuous. Why do he and Nick have such a cohesive partnership? Why would his involvement with the Hexenbiest Adaline Schade be such a big plot point moving forward? Grimm has not done a good enough job establishing the police partnership as an integral relationship in the show on par with Nick's relationship to Eddie or to his girlfriend/potential fiancé. To me, they serve a similar purpose, and if the preview for next week is accurate, Hank is about to assume the damsel in distress position that Juliette occupied a few weeks ago, and he will also have no idea what the Wesen world has to do with his involvement in a case."

Nick McHatton from TV Fanatic, gave a 4.0 star rating out of 5, stating, "Getting to the episode, not much happened this week, and for the most part Grimm suffered because of it. Most of it is due to the unresolved obstacles between Nick and Juliette. I'm all for characters growing further apart as the secrets one or more of them harbor continue to pile on and on, but when it happens too quickly or things begin to get out of hand it's time to change things up or resolve it. Grimm has reached that point."

Shilo Adams from TV Overmind wrote, "Grimm may have been about the birds tonight, but thankfully, it didn't lay an egg. (Har har.) 'The Thing with Feathers' felt like a strong balance between procedural and serial, Nick and his supporting cast, the human and Grimm sides of Nick Burkhardt. It's been tough for Grimm to strike that kind of harmony between all of its elements, with only a few episodes clicking on all cylinders. Last night may have featured a slightly rote case, but it was surrounded by a lot of good stuff and the way it was handled differentiated it from the dryer, less unique episodes earlier in the season. Grimm may have found a way to handle a solid supporting cast and two important sides of its storytelling, but it looks like Nick has to figure out just how much of his other life he'll let Juliette in on, if any at all."
