= Happily Ever Aftermath =

- Grimm episode
- Episode no.: Season 1 Episode 20
- Directed by: Terrence O'Hara
- Written by: David Greenwalt; Jim Kouf
- Cinematography by: Cort Fey
- Editing by: Jacque Toberen
- Production code: 120
- Original air date: May 4, 2012
- Running time: 42 minutes

Guest appearances
- David Clayton Rogers as Arthur Jarvis; Amanda Schull as Lucinda Jarvis; Tom Wright as Spencer Harrison

Episode chronology
← Previous "Leave It to Beavers"	Next → "Big Feet"
- Grimm season 1

"Happily Ever Aftermath" is the 20th episode of the supernatural drama television series Grimm of season 1, which premiered on May 4, 2012, on NBC. The episode was written by series creators David Greenwalt and Jim Kouf, and was directed by Terrence O'Hara.

== Plot ==
Opening quote: "And they lived happily ever after."

Bernard Aidikoff (David Williams), a man involved in a Ponzi scheme, commits suicide when police arrive to arrest him. Arthur Jarvis (David Clayton Rogers) tells his friend and advisor Spencer Harrison (Tom Wright) that all his money was invested with Aidikoff. They ask for money from Jarvis' wife's stepmother, Mavis Kerfield, who declines. Later that night, Mavis is killed by a creature that emits a supersonic scream.

Nick (David Giuntoli) and Hank (Russell Hornsby) investigate. After Nick has a bad dream, Juliette (Bitsie Tulloch) contacts the detective who investigated his parents' death. The detective informs Nick that the suspects of their deaths were the three thieves who tried to get the coins and a man named Akira Kimura. While questioning Arthur and Spencer, Nick discovers Spencer is a Murciélago. He is told that Arthur's wife, Lucinda (Amanda Schull), had a strained relationship with Mavis and her stepsisters Tiffany and Taylor.

Nick and Monroe (Silas Weir Mitchell) discover the Murciélagos can make a screech that can kill a person in an excruciatingly painful way. The only way to counter one is an artifact called the "Murciélago Matraca", which also emits a supersonic noise. Nick and Hank arrest Spencer as a suspect. Lucinda kills Tiffany with the same scream that killed Mavis. Spencer confesses to having a supersonic scream and using it to commit both murders, causing Hank to leave the room in disgust; he then tells Nick that Lucinda is the murderer. Spencer has known Lucinda since she was a child. She has no conscience and will kill the last remaining Kerfield, Taylor, to inherit her father's $52 million fortune. Spencer races to the Kerfield house and finds Jarvis, who had tried to stop Lucinda. Claw marks are visible on his face, where she had struck him.

Nick and Hank arrive as Lucinda torments Taylor and is about to attack her in her home. Monroe arrives with the Murciélago Matraca and he an Nick use it to force Lucinda from the house. Spencer is forced to kill her, but she kills him before dying herself. Nick and Hank show the Murciélago Matraca to Renard (Sasha Roiz), saying it was what Lucinda used to commit the murders. Nick begins investigating Akira Kimura.

== Reception ==
=== Viewers ===
The episode was viewed by 4.73 million people, earning a 1.4/4 in the 18-49 rating demographics on the Nielson ratings scale, ranking first on its timeslot and fifth for the night in the 18-49 demographics, behind Blue Bloods, 20/20, Undercover Boss, and Shark Tank. This was a 9% increase in viewership from the previous episode, which was watched by 4.33 from an 1.4/4 in the 18-49 demographics. This means that 1.4 percent of all households with televisions watched the episode, while 4 percent of all households watching television at that time watched it.

=== Critical reviews ===
"Happily Ever Aftermath" received mixed reviews. The A.V. Club's Kevin McFarland gave the episode a "C−" grade and wrote, "Cinderella is an odd choice for Grimm to use as the inspiration for an episode. It doesn't have any creatures to use as Wesen, and it's difficult to substitute any of the characters to solve that issue. Sure enough, 'Happy Ever Aftermath' is unquestionably the worst episode of Grimm's first season, and spoils a nice run of episodes heading into May sweeps. I guess my biggest problem with 'Happily Ever Aftermath' is that nobody recognizes the case resembles Cinderella exactly. I get that every case Nick deals with has a creature from some kind of folklore, but when he investigates this case with Hank, he has to make that connection. Somebody has to note that the case involves a stepmother and stepdaughter in the exact same setup as one of the most ubiquitous fairy tales in popular consciousness. I figured at least Sgt. Wu would make some kind of offhand comment about it, or that literally any character one the show would make a passing mention to how a great many of their cases resemble popular folk tales. Many of Nick's encounters with Wesen happen away from the police or don't draw direct attention to their equivalent Brothers Grimm tales, but like the Three Little Bears episode all the way back in the fall, this particular hour had too many similarities to go completely unnoticed."

Nick McHatton from TV Fanatic, gave a 4.0 star rating out of 5, stating: "It's been a long time since Grimm actually had a true procedural case, that didn't have any serial elements baked into it. I'm a little sad 'Happily Ever Aftermath' decided to return to Grimm's roots a little bit."

Shilo Adams from TV Overmind wrote, "Grimm went a little left in 'Happily Ever Aftermath' and while it didn't completely deliver, veering away from the events of last week and giving a fairly tired set-up to an intriguing case, it made up for it in ambition, the use of Juliette, and the callback to earlier episodes. I don't expect Grimm to suddenly become something other than a supernatural procedural, but when you're that bound to a specific structure, episodes like this help to expand what it can do and keep the show fresher. Every aspect of Grimm can make for a fairly good episode when executed well and given the spotlight, but relying on the same ratios of content and the same beats every week could make for a higher burn factor. There's only so many times that it can do the same thing in the same way and it be interesting, so something like 'Happily Ever Aftermath' gives Grimm a little more room to try new things and keep us on our toes. If that kind of growth means taking a flawed-but-pretty-decent episode every now and then, so be it."
