= Cat and Mouse (Grimm) =

- Grimm episode
- Episode no.: Season 1 Episode 18
- Directed by: Felix Alcala
- Written by: Jose Molina
- Cinematography by: Cort Fey
- Editing by: George Pilkinton
- Production code: 118
- Original air date: April 20, 2012
- Running time: 42 minutes

Guest appearances
- Bree Turner as Rosalee Calvert; Sebastian Roché as Edgar Waltz; Neil Hopkins as Ian Harmon

Episode chronology
| ← Previous "Love Sick" | Next → "Leave It to Beavers" |
- Grimm season 1

"Cat and Mouse" is the 18th episode of the supernatural drama television series Grimm of season 1, which premiered on April 20, 2012, on NBC. The episode was written by Jose Molina, and was directed by Felix Alcala.

== Plot ==
Opening quote: "'Perhaps some accident has befallen him,' said the king, and the next day he sent out two more huntsmen who were to search for him."

Ian Harmon (Neil Hopkins) is pursued by Edgar Waltz (Sebastian Roché), a member of the Verrat, a Wesen organization. Harmon is shot but escapes, leaving behind a bag, which Waltz takes. Waltz later visits Renard (Sasha Roiz) to ask for help, but he refuses. While Nick (David Giuntoli) and Hank (Russell Hornsby) investigate the shooting, Rosalee (Bree Turner) is visited by the wounded Ian, requesting help.

Waltz murders a bartender. He frames Ian and stays near the scene to make sure the police suspect him. While questioning Waltz, Nick sees him morph into a Hundjäger. Rosalee and Monroe (Silas Weir Mitchell) ask Nick for help to save Ian. At first, Nick tries to arrest Ian, but the others convince him he is innocent. Later, watching film in his trailer, Nick learns that the Verrat kill Wesen without trial. Waltz contacts Nick, suggesting a "Freidenreden" [sic, meaning "Friedenreden" ("peace talks")] - a temporary truce in order to negotiate - to discuss delivering Ian to him.

Nick gets Waltz to admit to the bartender's murder and gives the evidence to Hank and Renard. Rosalee acts as bait to lure Waltz, but the plan backfires and Waltz holds her hostage at gunpoint until they bring Ian. Nick and Monroe successfully distract Waltz, and Nick and Ian hold him at gunpoint. However, Ian then kills Waltz, claiming that more will come after him. Nick arrests Ian and leads him to his car. Before driving away, he tells Monroe to dispose of Waltz's body. Shortly later, he stops the car and releases Ian, giving him his documents and money and telling him to leave Portland and never return. The episode ends as the police discover Waltz's body in the woods.

== Reception ==
=== Viewers ===
The episode was viewed by 4.56 million people, earning a 1.4/4 in the 18-49 rating demographics on the Nielson ratings scale, ranking first on its timeslot and tying first for the night in the 18-49 demographics with Dateline NBC. This was a 9% decrease in viewership from the previous episode, which was watched by 4.96 from a 1.6/5 in the 18-49 demographics. This means that 1.4 percent of all households with televisions watched the episode, while 4 percent of all households watching television at that time watched it.

=== Critical reviews ===
"Cat and Mouse" received positive reviews. The A.V. Club's Les Chappell gave the episode a "B+" grade and wrote, "As the show gets into the last few episodes of its first season, it's been showing marked improvement in both those areas. I agree with Kevin that 'Love Sick' was one of the best episodes the show has done to date, able to resolve the long-running plot of Adalind Shade while advancing the development of lead characters Nick and Monroe. It's as if the continued signs of Grimm's survival—first a full-season pickup, then a second season renewal — encouraged David Greenwalt and the writing staff to make it a show that deserved its new lease on life, or to at least take some more chances with the storytelling."

Nick McHatton from TV Fanatic, gave a 4.5 star rating out of 5, stating: "Grimm expanded the looming danger tonight, peeling back even more of the layers of the Wesen world. 'Cat and Mouse' exposed a lot of the overarching mythology and what is driving some of the main players, while also illuminating why Nick is not your average, run-of-the-mill Grimm."

Shilo Adams from TV Overmind wrote, "Grimm may not have had any major action or chase sequences in 'Cat and Mouse', but it became one of the more exciting installments to date, due heavily to the progress in the storyline and the places we're about to go with it. Eschewing the in-the-trenches police work for a little history, a great guest performance, and a twisty game of, yes, cat and mouse, the episode felt a little more cinematic than normal, which is a good sign heading forward. For the longest time, Grimm had been stuck in a certain mode, but recently, it's expanded the scope of what it can do visually and story-wise, something that could launch it from good to great in the upcoming second season. 'Cat and Mouse' feels like the episode that could propel that movement in terms of quality or, to put it in Jersey Shore terms, it's the episode before the episode."
