= Organ Grinder (Grimm) =

- Grimm episode
- Episode no.: Season 1 Episode 10
- Directed by: Clark Mathis
- Written by: Akela Cooper; Spiro Skentzos
- Cinematography by: Cort Fey
- Editing by: Jacque Toberen
- Production code: 110
- Original air date: February 3, 2012
- Running time: 42 minutes

Guest appearances
- Valerie Cruz as Levine; Sharon Sachs as Dr. Harper; Daryl Sabara as Hanson; Hannah Marks as Gracie

Episode chronology
← Previous "Of Mouse and Man"	Next → "Tarantella"
- Grimm season 1

"Organ Grinder" is the 10th episode of the supernatural drama television series Grimm of season 1, which premiered on February 3, 2012, on NBC. The episode was written by story editors Akela Cooper and Spiro Skentzos, and was directed by Clark Mathis.

== Plot ==
Opening quote: "We shall see the crumbs of bread... and they will show us our way home again."

In a forest, two teenagers, Steven (Donald Fisher) and Kevin (James Maxey), are running from Wesen. Steven falls into a river and drowns, and his body is swept downstream and over a waterfall, while Kevin is captured. Monroe (Silas Weir Mitchell) and Nick (David Giuntoli) are talking over dinner. Nick wants to tell Juliette (Bitsie Tulloch) about his Grimm identity; Monroe warns of bad consequences. Nick is called when Steven's body is found, drained of blood and wearing a puka shell necklace. He, Hank (Russell Hornsby) and Sgt. Wu (Reggie Lee) investigate.

Nick and Hank find another youth with the same necklace and locate the sellers, Gracie and Hanson (Hannah Marks and Daryl Sabara). They say they last saw Steve in a clinic with a doctor named Levine (Valerie Cruz). Nick and Hank then attend a car crash, discovering the car contained blood, kidneys and livers. Nick sees that the driver is a Wesen, a Geier, before the driver dies. The DNA from the blood matches Steven's, while that from the organs does not; they suspect the organs are from other street kids.

Monroe affirms to Nick that the Geiers are responsible, as they harvest organs to turn into medicines. Monroe visits a tea shop that sells such medicines, providing Nick with the proof he needs. Nick then visits the shop. The owner, Freddy Calvert (Randy Schulman), a Fuchsbau, flees but Nick follows him and forces him reveal the source of the organs. Nick, Hank and Captain Renard (Sasha Roiz), go to a trailer in the forest. The occupant opens fire and is shot dead by police. Nick checks the man's phone and discovers the clinic is involved in the organ harvesting.

Medics from the clinic kidnap Hansen and Gracie and take them to a cabin where other youths (including Kevin) are being restrained before their organs are forcibly removed. Nick and Hank track down the cabin and kill the Geiers, after following a trail of puka shells dropped by Hanson. Dr. Levine flees, but Nick follows; she tries to ambush him but ends up falling into a fire pit and dying. Later at the station, Renard receives a package, marked with the symbol of the Reapers, containing the ear he cut from the reaper who tried to kill Nick. He receives a call from someone of apparent authority among the Reapers, warning that if Renard doesn't take control of Nick, then they will.

== Reception ==
=== Viewers ===
The episode was viewed by 4.76 million people, earning a 1.4/4 in the 18-49 rating demographics on the Nielson ratings scale, marking a 20% decrease in viewership. This means that 1.4 percent of all households with televisions watched the episode, while 4 percent of all households watching television at that time watched it.

=== Critical reviews ===
"Organ Grinder" received critical acclaim. The A.V. Club's Kevin McFarland gave the episode a "A" grade and wrote, "And here I thought Grimm wouldn't make it past three episodes. After a pretty serious downturn in the first few weeks back from the winter hiatus, Grimm pulled together its best episode yet, a tightly wound and gruesomely creepy standalone plot that finally brought out some real agency from Nick, showed a more useful side of Juliette, and threw in some great Silas Weir Mitchell scenes to boot. I was stunned at how involved I got over the course of the hour, and even though I feel like a bit of an easy grader, I have no problems giving this an A, since it represents to me the best that Grimm has to offer going forward."

Nick McHatton from TV Fanatic, gave a 4.7 star rating out of 5, stating: "Overall, I really enjoyed 'Organ Grinder' and it's Grimm's best mix yet of serial and procedural. Which is rather amazing considering how sparingly Eddie was used. Usually his screen time has an almost direct correlation to how much I enjoyed the episode."
