= Tarantella (Grimm) =

- Grimm episode
- Episode no.: Season 1 Episode 11
- Directed by: Peter Werner
- Written by: Alan DiFiore; Dan E. Fesman
- Cinematography by: Cort Fey
- Editing by: Chris Willingham
- Production code: 111
- Original air date: February 10, 2012
- Running time: 42 minutes

Guest appearances
- Amy Acker as Lena Marcinko; Nicholas Gonzalez as Ryan Showalter; Sharon Sachs as Dr. Harper; Robert Blanche as Sgt. Franco

Episode chronology
← Previous "Organ Grinder"	Next → "Last Grimm Standing"
- Grimm season 1

"Tarantella" is the 11th episode of the supernatural drama television series Grimm of season 1, which premiered on February 10, 2012, on NBC. The episode was written by co-executive producers Alan DiFiore and Dan E. Fesman, and was directed by Peter Werner.

== Plot ==
Opening quote: "Instantly, the priestess changed into a monstrous goblin-spider and the warrior found himself caught fast in her web."

Ryan Showalter (Nicholas Gonzalez), a Fuchsbau, flirts with an attractive woman, Lena (Amy Acker), in an art gallery. He takes her to his apartment and attacks her when she decides to leave. She fights back, turning into a spider-like creature, and squirts a liquid from her mouth into his, killing him. She leaves with a finger missing. Nick (David Giuntoli) and Monroe (Silas Weir Mitchell) talk about Nick's decision to reveal to Juliette (Bitsie Tulloch) his identity as a Grimm (which he hasn't yet done). Nick is called in to join Hank (Russell Hornsby) to investigate Showalter's murder. They discover that the liquid that killed him was spider venom.

Later, Lena seduces a man in a restaurant and then kills him in the same way as Showalter. Nick visits the address of the people who have been stalking his house. He confronts the owner, John Oblinger (Kyle Vahan), an Eisbiber, and Bud (Danny Bruno), the man who was fixing his fridge. He intimidates them into agreeing to stop stalking him.

From Monroe, Nick learns that the killer is a Spinnetod, a Black Widow of the creature world. Monroe introduces him to Charlotte (Dalene Young), another Spinnetod, who is 26 but appears significantly older. She says that, to prevent rapid aging, every 5 years the Spinnetod has to kill 3 people. Meanwhile, Showalter's watch, which Lena had given to her husband, is delivered to police after her daughter brings it to school and trades it. Lena's husband is taken to the police station.

Nick discovers that the missing finger matches Lena's fingerprint. He, Hank, and other police officers raid her house, but she has already left and is in a boat, about to kill her third victim. Nick arrives and is attacked by Lena, but she gets caught in a net and is detained. While taking the daughter to live with her grandmother, Nick sees that she too is a Spinnetod. In her cell, Lena is beginning to age rapidly.

== Reception ==
=== Viewers ===
The episode was viewed by 5.30 million people, earning a 1.6/5 in the 18-49 rating demographics on the Nielson ratings scale, marking a 10% increase in viewership. This means that 1.6 percent of all households with televisions watched the episode, while 5 percent of all households watching television at that time watched it.

=== Critical reviews ===
"Tarantella" received positive reviews. The A.V. Club's Kevin McFarland gave the episode a "B" grade and wrote, "Well, so much for consistency. I knew Grimm would take a bit of a dive after a series-best episode last week, and I knew better than to expect some forward development on the plot, but shows like this tend to operate on the assumption that after a handful of standalone plots, somewhere in the episode order is a very serialized one that moves the story along. Right now Grimm doesn't do that, and even a pretty cool case-of-the-week didn't abate my questions this week."

Nick McHatton from TV Fanatic, gave a 4.4 star rating out of 5, stating: "Overall, 'Tarantella' won't go down as the best episode of Grimm this season, but there was enough here to keep me entertained for the hour. I just hope Juliette and Eddie come back with bigger stories again next week."
