= Of Mouse and Man =

- Grimm episode
- Episode no.: Season 1 Episode 9
- Directed by: Omar Madha
- Written by: Alan DiFiore; Dan E. Fesman
- Cinematography by: Cort Fey
- Editing by: Chris Willingham
- Production code: 109
- Original air date: January 20, 2012
- Running time: 42 minutes

Guest appearances
- Amanda Walsh as Natalie Haverstraw; Fred Koehler as Martin Burgess

Episode chronology
← Previous "Game Ogre"	Next → "Organ Grinder"
- Grimm season 1

"Of Mouse and Man" is the ninth episode of the supernatural drama television series Grimm of season 1, which premiered on January 20, 2012, on NBC. The episode was written by supervising producer Alan DiFiore and co-executive producer Dan E. Fesman, and was directed by Omar Madha.

== Plot ==
Opening quote: "I am impelled not to squeak like a grateful and frightened mouse, but to roar...."

Leonard Drake (Gavin Hoffman) is killed and the killer moves the body to a dumpster, where it is taken by the garbage truck. Nick (David Giuntoli), Hank (Russell Hornsby) and Sgt. Wu (Reggie Lee) investigate. After a tip from the manager (J.W. Crawford), they contact Natalie Haverstraw (Amanda Walsh), Leonard's girlfriend, who was suffering domestic abuse and had moved out that night. She reveals they had got into an argument and she was rescued by neighbors Martin Burgess (Fred Koehler) and Mason Snyder (Doug Brooks).

Nick and Hank go to the shop where Martin works to interrogate him. His testimony backs up Natalie's, but Nick sees Martin woge into a Maushertz, a mouse-like creature. They then go to interrogate Snyder, who is revealed to be a Lausenschlange, a snake-like creature. Meanwhile, Juliette (Bitsie Tulloch) arrives home to find a woman (Jill Westerby) parked nearby photographing her house. Nick traces the car plates and writes down the address of the car's owner. Meanwhile, the owner of a repair shop (Enrique Arias) is killed: in a repeat of the pattern, his body is placed in a dumpster.

Monroe (Silas Weir Mitchell) is called to repair a clock tower when he is attacked by Wesen. When he comes to, the Wesen are gone, but his car is marked with a red scythe (the symbol of the Reapers). Juliette goes to the address Nick found: when the woman sees her, she rushes to get her children inside the house, obviously panicked. Martin goes to check on Natalie but finds Snyder is also there: Snyder attacks Martin in a parking lot but lets him go when witnesses appear. Investigating a lead, Nick and Hank go to Martin's apartment and discover his father (Ebbe Roe Smith), dead. Martin arrives at Snyder's office and is taunted by him in his Wesen form. He kills Snyder, then steals his car to go on a date with Natalie.

On the date, Martin sees a father bullying his own son and can't help but interfere, causing a scene. Lapsing into mental breakdown, Marty begins hallucinating, seeing his father in everybody around. He takes Natalie to his junk shop, where Nick and Hank find them. Marty begins seeing his father again and runs away, but Nick catches and arrests him. Nick then visits Monroe, who tells him he was attacked by Reapers, who preserve the status quo and were punishing him for helping a Grimm. Even though they might attack again, Monroe decides to continue helping Nick.

== Reception ==
=== Viewers ===
The episode was viewed by 5.92 million people, earning a 1.8/5 in the 18-49 rating demographics on the Nielson ratings scale, marking a 27% increase in viewership and ranking first in its timeslot and tying for first placei for the night in the 18-49 demographics, along with 20/20. This means that 1.8 percent of all households with televisions watched the episode, while 5 percent of all households watching television at that time watched it.

=== Critical reviews ===
"Of Mouse and Man" received mixed-to-positive reviews. The A.V. Club's Kevin McFarland gave the episode a "C+" grade and wrote, "I'm not pleased that Grimm is settling in to be a fairy tale version of the first half of Law & Order. It has a predictable routine, and until now I've been along for the ride, pleasantly surprised by some clever takes on Grimm fairy tales, more invested whenever Eddie Monroe gets more screen time, and impressed by a few episodes that have managed to combine some well-teased serialized storytelling within a taut police investigation. Unfortunately, 'Of Mouse and Man' is the weakest episode of Grimm to date. Its best scenes are B and C-plot stories that get less than five minutes of screen time, linked to Juliet's lingering fear after the break-in at her and Nick's house, and finally some tiny connection to the Reaper that showed up to talk with the captain at the beginning of the season."

In contrast, Nick McHatton from TV Fanatic, gave a 4.7 star rating out of 5, stating: "Grimm took a walk on the Fringe side tonight with 'Of Mouse and Man,' a serial-heavy episode. It's a fine line to walk, between serial and procedural, and leaning to one side or the other can be a scary proposition. How much is too much? Will the audience like it? Pushing the story ahead too quickly could alienate them. Not pushing it enough results in an audience that can grow disinterested. That's a lot to worry about, and yet I had none. 'Of Mouse and Man' was a fantastic episode."
