= Leave It to Beavers =

- Grimm episode
- Episode no.: Season 1 Episode 19
- Directed by: Holly Dale
- Written by: Nevin Densham
- Cinematography by: Eliot Rockett
- Editing by: Chris Willingham
- Production code: 119
- Original air date: April 27, 2012
- Running time: 42 minutes

Guest appearances
- David Zayas as Sal Butrell; Henri Lubatti as Reaper; Traber Burns as Robert Grosszahn

Episode chronology
← Previous "Cat and Mouse"	Next → "Happily Ever Aftermath"
- Grimm season 1

"Leave It to Beavers" is the 19th episode of the supernatural drama television series Grimm of season 1, which premiered on April 27, 2012, on NBC. The episode was written by Nevin Densham, and was directed by Holly Dale.

== Plot ==
Opening quote: "Wait!" the troll said, jumping in front of him. "This is my toll bridge. You have to pay a penny to go across."

In the woods, Nick (David Giuntoli) trains in the use of traditional Grimm weapons, with assistance from Monroe (Silas Weir Mitchell). At a bridge construction site, Sal Butrell (David Zayas), a Hässlich, meets with Robert Grosszahn (Traber Burns), who owes him money. Grosszahn refuses to pay, so Butrell kills him by drowning him in cement. Arnold Rosarot (Kevin Carroll) witnesses the event and calls 911, but Butrell notices him and goes after him. Arnold barely escapes.

Arnold flees to John Oblinger's (Kyle Vahan) house. Nick and Hank (Russell Hornsby) investigate the crime scene and Wu (Reggie Lee) finds the victim's phone: his last appointment was with someone dubbed "S.B." They interrogate Butrell but he denies involvement. Nick discovers he is a Hässlich. After the detectives have left, Butrell tells two employees that Nick is a Grimm and they need Reapers to kill him. Juliette (Bitsie Tulloch) invites Monroe to dinner, after his having saved her.

In Germany, Yannick (David Loftus) sends two Reapers - Junkers (Chino Binamo) and another (Henri Lubatti) - to kill Nick, despite Renard's (Sasha Roiz) warning. Nick persuades Arnold's friend, Bud (Danny Bruno) to arrange a lodge meeting of Eisbibers to discuss taking action against the Hässlich. The meeting is held, but, out of fear, they vote against. Butrell is kidnapped by the Reapers, who question him about Nick. Nick calls Butrell, requesting he appear at the police station for more questions; Butrell counters, trying to bluff Nick into coming to him.

Arnold decides to give testimony, and Nick and Hank arrest Butrell. The Reapers follow Nick and the Eisbibers back to the lodge. Nick baits the Reapers and they fight. One Reaper accidentally beheads the other, then Nick kills him. He then calls Monroe to help dispose of the bodies. Later, Nick arrives home to discover the Eisbibers have sent many gifts. The episode ends as Yannick receives a package from Nick: the Reapers' heads, accompanied by a note saying "Next time send your best".

== Reception ==
=== Viewers ===
The episode was viewed by 4.33 million people, earning a 1.4/4 in the 18-49 rating demographics on the Nielson ratings scale, ranking second on its timeslot and sixth for the night in the 18-49 demographics, behind 20/20, Shark Tank, CSI: NY, Blue Bloods, and Undercover Boss. This was a 6% decrease in viewership from the previous episode, which was watched by 4.56 from an 1.4/4 in the 18-49 demographics. This means that 1.4 percent of all households with televisions watched the episode, while 4 percent of all households watching television at that time watched it.

=== Critical reviews ===
"Leave It to Beavers" received positive reviews. The A.V. Club's Kevin McFarland gave the episode a "B" grade and wrote, "About two thirds of the way through 'Leave It To The Beavers,' one of the beaver Wesen tells Nick that 'bravery isn’t in our nature,' but our hero refuses to believe that ancient standard. He's still relatively new to investigating matters of the Wesen world, and wants to believe in change; that any creature, like Bud, the first beaver he encountered, can muster up enough bravery to stand up to anything, from bridge trolls enforcing archaic tradition to Reapers out collecting heads. Though there is a moral built into that conversation, and the episode at large, it's hard to believe that this show would reach for an episodic moral over darkly lit action sequences, which inevitably pop up in the last ten minutes this week. It's a thrilling conclusion to an episode filled with a lot of talking and stunted inaction. Over the back half of this season, I've gone from wanting this show to succeed while feeling frustrated at how it squanders potential, into largely enjoying everything with a few reservations. That trepidation was more pronounced tonight that it has been the past two weeks, but still, I'm very pleased with the progress."

Nick McHatton from TV Fanatic, gave a 4.8 star rating out of 5, stating: "'Leave It To Beavers' is the episode we've all been waiting for. In many ways it is the perfect episode to transition towards the end of the season. So many of its plot culminations are moments we've been rooting for and wanting and waiting to see since the beginning of the series."

Shilo Adams from TV Overmind wrote, "The most frustrating episode of television is one that has all the elements to be great yet doesn't quite gel. You see the potential on the screen and keep waiting for that moment when it all clicks, but there's something about it that keeps it from feeling complete. It could be something relatively minor that undoes its quality, like a momentary writing lapse or a misused character, but it tends to come down to execution. Put simply, the episode doesn't get pieced together properly, typically leaving things a bit uneven or lacking compared to what they could have been. After a string of improvement, 'Leave It to Beavers' became that type of episode for Grimm."
