= The Thing with Feathers =

The Thing with Feathers may refer to:

- The Thing with Feathers (film), 2025 British drama film
- "The Thing with Feathers" (Grimm), a 2012 episode of the TV series Grimm
- "The Thing with Feathers", a 2006 episode of the TV series Without a Trace
- "The Thing with Feathers", a 2016 episode of the TV series The Night Shift
