= Leave It to Beaver (disambiguation) =

Leave It to Beaver is a 1957–1963 American television situation comedy.

It may also refer to:

- Leave It to Beaver (film), a 1997 film based on the television show
- "Leave It to Beaver" (Veronica Mars), an episode of the television show Veronica Mars
- Leave It to Beavers, an episode of the supernatural drama television series Grimm
