= Kevin Turner (linebacker) =

American football player (born 1958)

No. 66, 54, 60, 59, 50
- Position: Linebacker

Personal information
- Born: February 5, 1958 (age 68); Kern County, California, U.S.
- Listed height: 6 ft 2 in (1.88 m)
- Listed weight: 223 lb (101 kg)

Career information
- High school: Mission San Jose (Fremont, California)
- College: Pacific
- NFL draft: 1980: undrafted

Career history
- Washington Redskins (1980)*; New York Giants (1980); Washington Redskins (1981); Seattle Seahawks (1981); Cleveland Browns (1982); Los Angeles Express (1984-1985)
- * Offseason or practice squad member only

Career NFL statistics
- Fumble recoveries: 1
- Stats at Pro Football Reference

Kevin Ray Turner (born February 5, 1958) is an American former professional football player who was a linebacker in the National Football League (NFL) for the New York Giants, Washington Redskins, Seattle Seahawks, and Cleveland Browns. He played college football for the Pacific Tigers.

== Personal life ==
His daughter is actress Bree Turner.
