= Three Coins in a Fuchsbau =

- Grimm episode
- Episode no.: Season 1 Episode 13
- Directed by: Norberto Barba
- Written by: David Greenwalt; Jim Kouf
- Cinematography by: Cort Fey
- Editing by: Chris Willingham
- Production code: 113
- Original air date: March 2, 2012
- Running time: 42 minutes

Guest appearances
- Titus Welliver as Farley Kolt; Sharon Sachs as Dr. Harper; Jordi Caballero as Soledad Marquesa; Alan Smyth as Ian Flynn

Episode chronology
| ← Previous "Last Grimm Standing" | Next → "Plumed Serpent" |
- Grimm season 1

"Three Coins in a Fuchsbau" is the 13th episode of the supernatural drama television series Grimm of season 1, which premiered on March 2, 2012, on NBC. The episode was written by series creators David Greenwalt and Jim Kouf, and was directed by Norberto Barba.

== Plot ==
Opening quote: "For me there are neither locks nor bolts, whatsoever I desire is mine."

Three armed men rob a jewelry store. The owner, Sam Bertram (Robert Cohn) hides in a vault, where he gets out three coins and swallows them; he is killed when the robbers blow open the vault door. Not finding the coins, they take what they can and escape. Nick (David Giuntoli) and Hank (Russell Hornsby) are called to investigate, discovering the robbers planned the heist very carefully and professionally. One of the robbers, Soledad Marquesa (Jordi Caballero), still looking for the coins, returns to the scene while the police are still there, and Nick sees him shapeshift into a Schakal.

The medical examiner (Sharon Sachs) shows Nick and Hank the coins, which she has retrieved from the shopowner's stomach. Hank takes possession of them, ignoring the examiner's protests. He starts acting strangely, becoming very possessive of them.

Two of the robbers are tricked into shooting each other by another creature, a Steinadler, Farley Kolt (Titus Welliver). Marquesa returns and is berated by Kolt for missing the coins. Nick and Hank raid the house and arrest Kolt, but Marquesa escapes. Captain Renard (Sasha Roiz) demands Hank hand the coins over; he takes them himself and begins to be influenced by them. Marquesa questions the medical examiner about the coins.

Kolt tells Nick that the coins give whoever possesses them charismatic influence other people. They had once been in the possession of Hitler, before disappearing. In fact, they were being protected by a Grimm, until she was found and murdered. After her death, her orphaned son was looked after by his aunt, who left her lover - Kolt - to do so. That aunt was Marie, and the orphaned son was Nick. Kolt asks Nick to release him so he can help search for the coins. Nick is reluctant, but later does so.

In Kolt's hotel room, Nick and Hank discover a film reel and an OSS document from 1945. The document warns that the coins are toxic and should not be touched. Marquesa chases Renard and attacks him in a parking lot. Nick and Hank intervene, saving Renard, but Marquesa dies before Nick can question him about his mother's death. In the chaos, Kolt steals the coins.

Nick confronts Kolt in his hotel room and takes the coins. He hides them in his aunt's trailer and watches the reel from Kolt's suitcase. The film is black-and-white footage of Hitler delivering a speech. A close-up shows Hitler wearing the coins on his coat, and Nick sees him transform into a Blutbad.

== Reception ==
=== Viewers ===
The episode was viewed by 5.30 million people, earning a 1.6/5 in the 18-49 rating demographics on the Nielson ratings scale, ranking first on its timeslot and fourth for the night in the 18-49 demographics, behind Shark Tank, Blue Bloods, and Undercover Boss. This was a 10% increase in viewership from the previous episode, which was watched by 4.79 from an 1.5/5 in the 18-49 demographics.

=== Critical reviews ===
"Three Coins in a Fuchsbau" received positive reviews. The A.V. Club's Kevin McFarland gave the episode a "B" grade and wrote, "This week threw a wrench into the typical procedural structure, using another tried-and-true option for supernatural shows: the magic object. In this case it's three gold coins, which benefit the holder with an extreme amount of confidence and bravado, but with the drawback that they make whoever touches them completely obsessed with obtaining them. I can think of many different shows that have used this different structure to brilliant effect — the Buffy bottle episode 'Older and Far Away' is probably my favorite kind-of-cheating example — but Grimm hasn't built up the kind of complicated relationships to pull something like that off. This is the kind of mystical element that everyone wants to have, not one that forces a new kind of situation. The same, stable steps through a case are the still there, just heightened a little bit by the presence of the coins."

Nick McHatton from TV Fanatic, gave a 4.5 star rating out of 5, stating: "The bromance between Eddie and Nick brings most of the humor to the show and he's a much better partner than Hank. With all the attention he gave to the cameras in Nick's trailer, I kind of wished Nick had invited him back to watch the old film. I would have loved to get Eddie's take on Hitler being a creature."

Shilo Adams from TV Overmind, stated: "'Three Coins in a Fuchsbau' was a tiny step back from the past few episodes in overall scope, but I think that it can be an important episode going forward. Nick hasn't really had to deal with his past much, once Marie, his last living relative, passed and it'll be interesting to see how he responds emotionally to Kolt's information. The fact that he included Juliette in the loop may indicate that Nick won't be ignoring the fact that his entire worldview got shook once he found out the role the Wesen world played in the death of his parents. He's seemed like a nice, normal guy from the beginning of the series and I root for him and Monroe to continue learning from one another and growing, but I felt like I barely knew Nick Burkhardt before 'Three Coins in a Fuchsbau'. The episode may not have provided a shocking reveal, but the fact that Grimm seems ready to embrace its true beginnings and bring on the mythology is a very, very promising thing for the show. Grimm may not be much on character backgrounds, but when it does fill in between the lines, I find that I'm liking it (and its characters) more and more."
