= Thania St. John =

American screenwriter

- Born: Chicago, Illinois, U.S.
- Occupations: Television producer and writer
- Years active: 1989–present

Thania Papas St. John is an American based television producer and writer. She graduated from Harvard University in 1983 and is one of the founding members of the League of Hollywood Women Writers.

She has written and/or produced episodes for a number of notable television series including: Project Blue Book, Chicago Fire, 21 Jump Street, Life Goes On, Lois & Clark: The New Adventures of Superman, Buffy the Vampire Slayer, Roswell, Wild Card, Huff, Eureka, Drop Dead Diva and Unnatural History.

In 1997, she created the television series Crisis Center. She also adapted The Witcher short stories into Netflix's The Witcher TV series, released in 2019. In 2025 she wrote two episodes of the Bosch spinoff TV series Ballard.

She has taught television writing at American Film Institute and Sundance Collab.
