= Catherine Butterfield =

American screenwriter

Catherine Butterfield (born February 5, 1958, in Manhattan, New York City, New York) is an American playwright, screenwriter and actress. She lives in Santa Monica with her partner, Ron West. She has one daughter, the actress Audrey Corsa.

== Early life ==
Butterfield was born in Manhattan on February 5, 1958. She was raised in Edina, Minnesota, and Hingham, Massachusetts, the daughter of a television executive. The eldest of five, she graduated from Southern Methodist University with a BFA in drama and began her career as an actress in regional theatre (Oregon Shakespeare Festival, Pittsburgh Public Theater, Seattle Repertory, Long Wharf, later starring in New York productions of her plays Joined at the Head, Snowing at Delphi, Where the Truth Lies, and Bobo's Birthday, a one-woman show.

== Career ==
Her play Joined at the Head was performed at the Manhattan Theatre Club in 1992 and won the Robert L. Stevens/Kennedy Center award for excellence, as well as being published in Best Plays of 1992-93 (ISBN 0-87910-173-3). Mel Gussow wrote, "In this, her first full-length play to be presented in New York, Butterfield is revealed as a playwright with a refreshing talent for probing the reality of relationships. In a manner related to that of Tom Stoppard and John Guare, the work deals enticingly with truth and fiction... a vibrant reflection on life and art." (New York Times, November 19, 1992, "When an Old Friendship Is More Than It Seems".) Subsequent award-winning plays include Life in the Trees (Davie award—Best new play in regional theatre) and The Sleeper (2004 Kaufman and Hart Prize for new American comedy.) In 2014, she wrote It Has To Be You, and in 2016 she wrote the comedy Life Expectancy, which debuted at the Hollywood Fringe.

In television, she has been a writer/producer for Ghost Whisperer, Party of Five, and Fame L.A.. For the web, she wrote and directed the short film John's Hand, which can be seen at www.strike.tv and was an official entry at the Asheville Film Festival and Los Angeles Hi-Def Film Festival. She wrote a screenplay for Participant Media based on the life of Susie Krabacher, a Playboy centerfold turned savior of the children of Haiti, and developed a film for Lifetime TV based on the life of the teen-aged violinist Tiffany Clay, the subject of a 2009 article in The New York Times.

== Bibliography ==
=== Published plays ===
- Brownstone (Playscripts, Inc.)
- Joined at the Head (Dramatists Play Service)
- Life in the Trees (Dramatists Play Service)
- Snowing at Delphi (Dramatists Play Service)
- Where the Truth Lies (Samuel French)
- The Sleeper (Dramatists Play Service)
- No Problem (one-act play) (Samuel French)
- Best Plays of 1992 (anthology) (Smith and Kraus)

=== Anthologies and collections ===
- Women Playwrights: The Best Plays of 1992 (Smith and Krause, ISBN 1-880399-22-9)
- One on One: The Best Women's Monologues for the Nineties (Jack Temchin, ISBN 1-55783-152-1)
- Off-Off Broadway Festival Plays, Series 13 (Samuel French, ISBN 0-573-62364-3)
- The Best Women's Stage Monologues of 1994 (Smith and Kraus, ISBN 1-880399-65-2)
