= Dan E. Fesman =

American screenwriter

Dan E. Fesman (sometimes credited as Dan Fesman) is a television producer and writer. Fesman graduated from Teaneck High School in Teaneck, New Jersey, where he participated in the drama club.

Fesman has also been producer and writer on several recent series, including Grimm, LAX, Wonderfalls and Dead Like Me. He has written for Special Unit 2, Cover Me: Based on the True Life of an FBI Family, Now and Again, The King of Queens, Zero Stress and NCIS.
