= Claire Coffee =

American actress (born 1980)

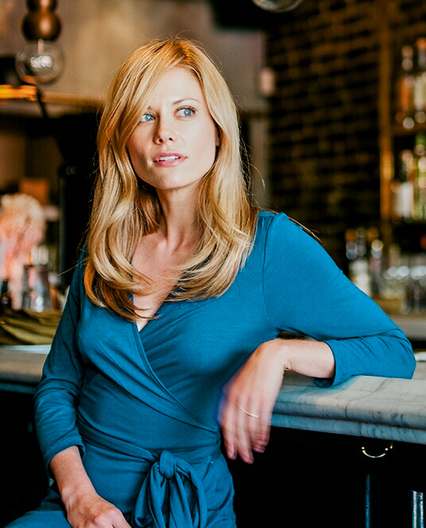
- Born: Claire Elizabeth Coffee; San Francisco, California, U.S.
- Occupation: Actress
- Years active: 2001–present
- Spouse: Chris Thile (m. 2013)
- Children: 1

Claire Elizabeth Coffee is an American actress. She is best known for her role as Adalind Schade in the NBC fantasy drama Grimm.

== Early life ==
Coffee grew up in Monterey, California. She attended the Santa Catalina School for girls and has a degree in Theatre from Northwestern University.

== Career ==
She had a recurring role on The West Wing as Cassie Tatum in 2003. Between 2007 and 2009, Coffee played nurse Nadine Crowell on General Hospital. She played attorney Janie Ross on the TNT series Franklin & Bash and appeared for six seasons on the NBC series Grimm as the Hexenbiest Adalind Schade.

== Personal life ==
Coffee married musician Chris Thile on December 23, 2013, at Blackberry Farm, Walland, Tennessee. They have one son. Coffee resided with her son and husband in Portland, Oregon, where the show Grimm was filmed, until 2016. The family now resides in Brooklyn, New York.

== Filmography ==
Section source:

=== Film ===
Year	Title	Role	Notes
2004	Leave No Trace	Hillary	
2008	Wednesday Again	Lisa Olson	
2008	Remarkable Power	Dana	
2009	Mafia Lending Services	Gina	Short
2009	Chelsey & Kelsey Are Really Good Roommates	Chelsey	Short
2013	Inventing Adam	Spencer	
2014	Grind	Autumn	Short
2016	Buddymoon	Polly	
2018	The Competition	Gena Mauldin	

=== Television ===
Year	Title	Role	Notes
2001	The Mind of the Married Man	Young Couple	"When We Were Nice"
2002	The Random Years	Denise	"Inherit the Windbreaker"
2002	Leap of Faith	Deesa	"The Baby Snugglers"
2002	Off Centre	J'Sandra	"Diddler on the Roof"
2003	The West Wing	Cassie Tatum	"The California 47th", "Red Haven's on Fire", "Life on Mars"
2004	Americana	Gwen	TV film
2005	McBride: It's Murder, Madam	Marilyn Fletcher	TV film
2005	Wild Things: Diamonds in the Rough	Jenny Bellamy	TV film
2005	Cold Case	Kelly Witkowski (1977)	"Creatures of the Night"
2006	13 Graves	Gillian Becker	TV film
2006	Strong Medicine	Cassandra Turley	"Unorthodox Treatment"
2006	Bones	Special Agent Tricia Finn	"The Woman at the Airport"
2006	CSI: Crime Scene Investigation	Cindy Jansen	"Rashomama"
2006	Psych	Sally Reynolds	"Weekend Warriors"
2006	NCIS	Nikki Cranshaw	"Singled Out"
2006	Death Row	Missy	TV film
2006	My Boys	Claire	"Mixed Signals"
2007	CSI: Miami	Wendy Legassic	"Deep Freeze"
2007–2009	General Hospital	Nadine Crowell	Main role
2009	This Might Hurt	Claire Keating	TV film
2009	The League	Claire	"Mr. McGibblets"
2010	The Good Guys	Eve	"Common Enemies"
2011–2012	Franklin & Bash	Janie Ross	Recurring role (seasons 1 & 2)
2011–2017	Grimm	Adalind Schade	Recurring role (seasons 1 & 2), regular (seasons 3–6)
2012	Holly's Holiday	Holly Maddux	TV film
2013	Royal Pains	Maya	"Pregnant Paws"
2014	Chelsey and Kelsey	Chelsey	
2017	Kevin Can Wait	Irene	"Neighborhood Watch"
2018	S.W.A.T.	Kira	"Never Again", "The Tiffany Experience", "Track"
2019	The Sisterhood	Ashley Shields	TV film
2019	A Daughter's Plan to Kill	Katie	TV film
2020	Lincoln Rhyme: Hunt for the Bone Collector	Danielle	Main role
2021	A New Lease on Christmas	Becky	TV film
2022	Law & Order	Andrea Rankin	"Camouflage"
2025-2026	FBI	Anna Vorpe	"Captured", "Falsetto", “Daybreak”, "Defector"

=== Video games ===
Year	Title	Role	Notes
2003	Medal of Honor: Rising Sun	Mary Griffin (voice)	
