= Bree Turner =

American actress and dancer (born 1977)

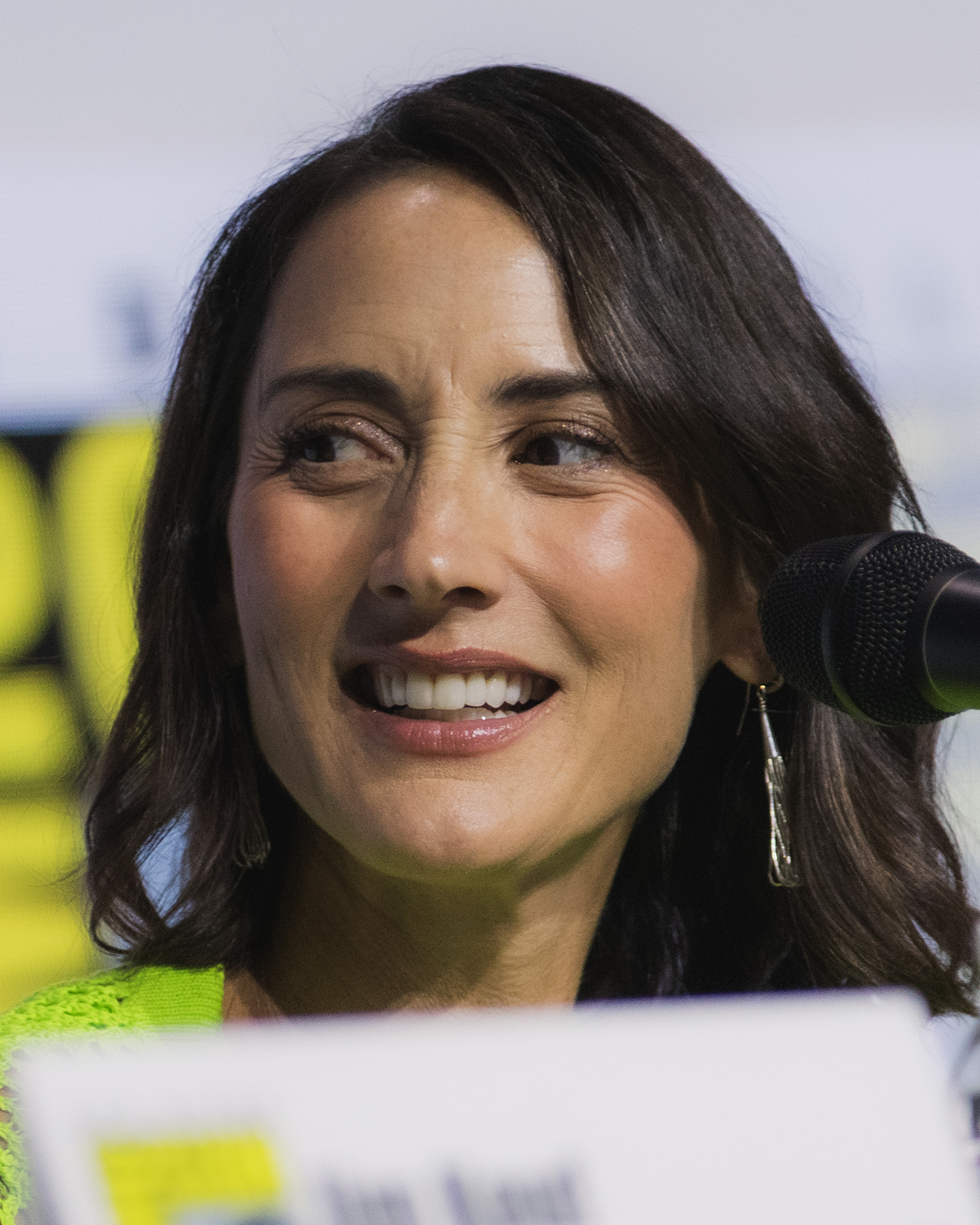
- Turner in 2026
- Born: Bree Nicole Turner; March 10, 1977 (age 49); Palo Alto, California, U.S.
- Occupation: Actress
- Years active: 1995–present
- Spouse: Justin Saliman (m. 2008; div. 2018)
- Children: 2
- Father: Kevin Turner

Bree Nicole Turner (born March 10, 1977) is an American actress and dancer; she is best known for her roles in several major motion pictures in films like My Best Friend's Wedding, Austin Powers: The Spy Who Shagged Me, American Pie 2, The Wedding Planner, Just My Luck and Firehouse Dog, as well as her series regular role as Rosalee Calvert on Grimm.

== Early life ==
Turner was born March 10, 1977, in Palo Alto, California and grew up in Alamo, California. Her maternal grandparents immigrated from Australia to Palo Alto, California in the 1910s. Her father is former NFL linebacker Kevin Turner. In 1995, she graduated from Monte Vista High School in Danville, California, where she was voted 1994 Homecoming Queen. She then attended King's College London and University of California, Los Angeles.

== Career ==
Turner landed her first speaking role in Deuce Bigalow: Male Gigolo. That same year, she was cast on MTV's late night anthology series Undressed. She also did TV commercials for Gap "Khaki Country" and "Khaki-a-go-go," and for Dr Pepper.

Turner was a background dancer in feature films such as The Big Lebowski (1998), She's All That (1999) and Austin Powers: The Spy Who Shagged Me (1999). She had roles in The Wedding Planner (2001), Joe Dirt (2001), American Pie 2 (2001), and the starring role of head cheerleader in Bring It On Again (2004).

Turner has also appeared in independent films, including the musical and romantic drama True Vinyl (2000) and the wrestling drama Backyard Dogs.

Turner has worked in television, with recurring roles on the UPN sitcom Moesha, the ABC sitcom Spin City, the CBS drama Cold Case, guest starred on the UPN drama Sex, Love & Secrets and starred in the pilot episode ("Incident On and Off a Mountain Road") of Showtime's horror/thriller series Masters of Horror.

Turner has also acted on stage, playing Ivy in The Pages of My Diary I'd Rather Not Read at Hudson Mainstage Theater in Los Angeles in January 2003.

As of 2017, Turner finished her sixth season on the NBC drama series Grimm, portraying the character Rosalee Calvert. The part was a recurring role in season 1, moving to the main cast from season 2 onwards.

== Personal life ==
In 2008, Turner married orthopedic surgeon Justin Saliman at the Casa Del Mar hotel in Santa Monica, California. They have a daughter and a son. In March 2018, Turner filed for divorce citing irreconcilable differences.

== Filmography ==
=== Film ===
Year	Title	Role	Notes
1996	Dunston Checks In	French Girl	
1997	My Best Friend's Wedding	Title Sequence Bridesmaid	
1998	Night Train	Girl	Short
1999	She's All That	Dancer	
1999	Duel on Planet Z	Nurse Yummhumm	Short
1999	Austin Powers: The Spy Who Shagged Me	Dancer #1	
1999	Deuce Bigalow: Male Gigolo	Allison	
1999	Tweeker	Heather	
2000	Backyard Dogs	Kristy James	Video
2001	The Wedding Planner	Tracy	
2001	Joe Dirt	Sorority Girl	
2001	American Pie 2	Amy's Friend	
2001	The Myersons	Jenny	
2001	North Hollywood	Allison	TV movie
2002	The Quest for Length	Roger's Girlfriend	Short
2002	Sorority Boys	Tiffany	
2002	Whacked!	Amanda	
2003	Special Breakfast Eggroll: 99¢	Jessie	
2004	Bring It On Again	Tina Hammersmith	Video
2004	Perfect Opposites	Starr	
2004	True Vinyl	Maya Taylor	
2005	1/4life	Brittany	TV movie
2006	The TV Set	Carla	
2006	Jekyll + Hyde	Martha Utterson	Video
2006	Just My Luck	Dana	
2006	Flirt	Diana Crane	TV movie
2007	Firehouse Dog	Liz Knowles	
2008	The Year of Getting to Know Us	Sandi	
2008	Green Flash	Charla	Video
2008	Animated American	Trixie	Short
2009	The Ugly Truth	Joy Haim	
2009	Celebrities Anonymous	Amanda Stiles	TV movie
2010	Dancing Ninja	Crystal	
2011	Take Me Home	Eve	
2011	Identity	Tessa	TV movie
2011	Grace	Kirsten	TV movie
2012	Smashed	Freda	
2012	Jewtopia	Helen O'Connell	
2012	Life's a Beach	Aimee	
2012	Wakey Wakey	Disco Dancer	
2014	Peter's Ashes	Ruth	Short
2018	Punching Bag	Princess	Short
2019	I'm F%$#ing Fine	Maddie	Short
2020	Glass Houses	Madeline Cooper	TV movie
2020	Me Too Nice	Jenny	Short

=== Television ===
Year	Title	Role	Notes
1997	USA High	Tina	Episode: "Love Is Blind"
1998	Hang Time	Gail	Episode: "The Tall and the Short of It"
1999	Undressed	Tina	Main cast: season 1
2000–2001	Moesha	Brenda	Recurring cast: season 6
2002	Spin City	Tracy Crandall	Episode: "O Mother, Where Art Thou?" & "Age Against the Machine"
2003	Andy Richter Controls the Universe	Teena	Episode: "Final Fantasy"
2003	Cold Case	Ellen Curtis	Episode: "Look Again" & "Our Boy Is Back"
2004	Century City	Eva	Episode: "A Mind Is a Terrible Thing to Lose"
2004	Good Girls Don't...	Marjorie	Main cast
2005	Las Vegas	Jenny	Episode: "Sperm Whales and Spearmint Rhinos"
2005	Sex, Love & Secrets	Sam	Episode: "Molting"
2005	Masters of Horror	Ellen	Episode: "Incident On and Off a Mountain Road"
2006	Love Monkey	Annette	Episode: "Opportunity Knocks"
2007	Traveler	Nell Graham	Episode: "New Haven"
2007	Standoff	Natalie	Episode: "Road Trip"
2008	Quarterlife	Carly	Episode: "Pilot"
2008	Ghost Whisperer	Elizabeth Gardner	Episode: "Ball & Chain"
2010	Rules of Engagement	Heather	Episode: "Fun Run"
2011	Raising Hope	Susan	Episode: "Sabrina Has Money"
2012	The Mentalist	Iris Porchetto	Episode: "My Bloody Valentine"
2012	Wedding Band	Sara	Episode: "Pilot"
2012–2017	Grimm	Rosalee Calvert	Recurring cast: season 1, main cast: season 2–6
2013	Grimm: Bad Hair Day	Rosalee Calvert	TV mini series short
2014	Grimm: Love Is In the Air	Rosalee Calvert	TV mini series short
2018	9-1-1	Sarah	Episode:"Karma's a Bitch"
2019–2020	Law & Order: Special Victims Unit	Granya Marcil	Episode: "Can't Be Held Accountable" & "Must Be Held Accountable"
