= Reggie Lee (actor) =

Filipino actor (born 1975)

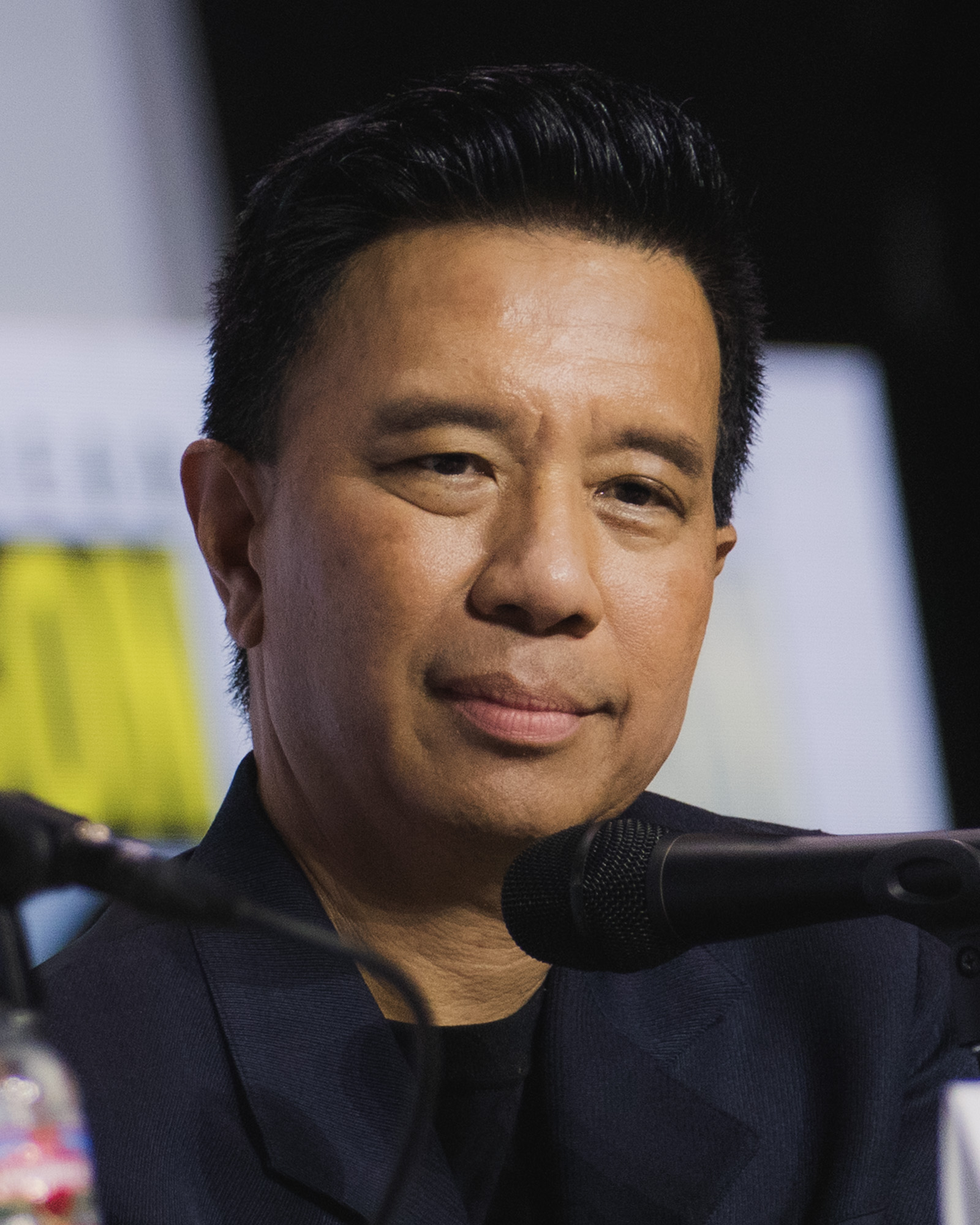
- Reggie Lee in 2026
- Born: Reggie Telmo Valdez; October 4, 1975 (age 50); Quezon City, Philippines
- Other name: R.T. Lee
- Education: Padua Franciscan High School
- Occupation: Actor
- Years active: 1996–present

Reggie Telmo Valdez (born October 4, 1975), known professionally as Reggie Lee, is a Filipino actor. He is known to television audiences for his roles as Bill Kim on Prison Break (2006–07), Sgt. Drew Wu on Grimm (2011–17), and Deputy District Attorney Thomas Choi on All Rise (2019–23). He is also known for his role in films like The Fast and the Furious (2001), Tropic Thunder (2008), and The Dark Knight Rises (2012).

== Early life ==
Valdez was born in Quezon City, the Philippines, to Zenaida Telmo and Jesus Espiritu Valdez. Although fluent in English, he also speaks Tagalog. At the age of five, he moved with his family to the Cleveland, Ohio area, including Parma and Strongsville. While still a student, he performed in shows at the Greenbrier Theatre (now the Cassidy Theatre) in Parma Heights and was an intern at the Cleveland Play House. He graduated from Padua Franciscan High School in Parma.

Although accepted to Harvard, he instead decided to move to Los Angeles to pursue acting. He later changed his last name from Valdez to Lee, stating in a 2001 interview that "they kept calling me in for Hispanic roles, and I'm a far cry from Hispanic"; he took the name Lee from his grandparents.

== Career ==
In 1992, at the age of 17, Lee moved to Los Angeles, where he joined a national tour of Miss Saigon. He later worked as a dancer for Prince on the MTV Video Music Awards and toured nationally with the musical Heartstrings. He was in the original company of the 1994 Broadway revival of Carousel. In 1997, he received a Drama-Logue Award for his performance in F.O.B. at East West Players, an Asian-American theatre organization in Los Angeles. With his role garnering critical acclaim, he also starred in their production of Carry the Tiger to the Mountain.

Since starring as Lance Nguyen in The Fast and the Furious, Lee appeared as Tai Huang in the Walt Disney Pictures film Pirates of the Caribbean: Dead Man's Chest. He has played Secret Service Special Agent Bill Kim in the FOX drama Prison Break, a character he describes as "a guilty pleasure to play, wonderfully complex and devious". He appeared in Chinaman's Chance, about which he said "It's an important story that definitely needs to be told and humanized. Plus I get to play pretend in the Old West. How great is that?"

In 2010, he guest-starred as Tom in the NBC series Persons Unknown.

In 2012, he played Ross, a Gotham City police officer in Christopher Nolan's The Dark Knight Rises.

From 2011 to 2017, he played Desk Sergeant Drew Wu in the NBC supernatural police drama Grimm.

In 2018, for NCIS: New Orleans, he appeared as Assistant Special Agent in Charge Steven Thompson. He previously appeared in an unrelated role in an episode of NCIS. In 2021, Blogtalk with MJ Racadio named him one of the "75 Most Influential Filipino-Americans".

== Personal life ==
Lee has two younger brothers, musician Nathan and comic book artist R.V. Valdez.

== Filmography ==
=== Film ===
| Year | Title | Role | Notes |
|---|---|---|---|
| 1999 | The Big Blind | | |
| 2000 | Southstreet Lullaby | Mahler Greeter | |
| 2000 | Psycho Beach Party | Dancer | |
| 2000 | Drift | Ryan | as 'R.T. Lee' |
| 2001 | XCU: Extreme Close Up | Huy Phan | |
| 2001 | The Fast and the Furious | Lance Nguyen | |
| 2001 | The Parlor | Slappy Sue | Short film |
| 2002 | Black Hole | Justin | |
| 2002 | Reality School | Student | |
| 2002 | The First $20 Million Is Always the Hardest | Suit | |
| 2003 | Masked and Anonymous | Armed Man | |
| 2003 | Net Games | Laurence | |
| 2005 | Amateur | Ron Harper | |
| 2006 | Pirates of the Caribbean: Dead Man's Chest | Headless | |
| 2006 | Dimples | Dr. Ross Hammer | |
| 2007 | Pirates of the Caribbean: At World's End | Tai Huang | |
| 2008 | I Am Somebody: No Chance in Hell | Sing | a.k.a. Chinaman's Chance |
| 2008 | Tropic Thunder | Byong | |
| 2009 | Drag Me to Hell | Stu Rubin | |
| 2009 | Star Trek | Test Administrator Kobayashi Maru | |
| 2010 | Life as We Know It | Alan Burke | |
| 2011 | Crazy, Stupid, Love | Officer Huang | |
| 2012 | Safe | Quan Chang | |
| 2012 | Here Comes the Boom | Mr. De La Cruz | |
| 2012 | The Dark Knight Rises | GCPD Officer Ross | |
| 2019 | Disappearance | Detective Park | |
| 2021 | Sweet Girl | Dr. Wu | |
| TBD | The Weeping | Jim | Post-production |
| TBD | Above the Break | Sheriff Langford | Filming |

=== Television ===
| Year | Title | Role | Notes |
|---|---|---|---|
| 1996 | Diagnosis: Murder | Kim Ho | Episode: "The ABC's of Murder" |
| 1997 | Dangerous Minds | Student | Episode: "Teach, Don't Touch" |
| 1997 | Moloney | Ramon | Episode: "Loves and Lost" |
| 1998 | Babylon 5 | Chen Hikaru | Episode: "The Corps is Mother, The Corps is Father" |
| 1998 | The Wayans Bros. | Reporter #2 | Episode: "Pops' Campaign" |
| 1998 | ER | Christian | Episode: "Split Second" |
| 1998 | Sister, Sister | Lawson Hicks | Episode: "We Are Family" |
| 1998 | Hyperion Bay | Lives-on-Pizza | Episode: "Family Business" |
| 1998 | Mad About You | Gardner's Assistant | Episode: "Weekend in L.A." |
| 1998 | Seven Days | Duncan | Episode: "Shadow Play" |
| 1999 | Beverly Hills, 90210 | Richard | Episode: "The Following Options" |
| 1999 | Two of a Kind | Waiter | Episode: "When a Man Loves a Woman" |
| 1999 | Sons of Thunder | Bad Guy | Episode: "Thunder by Your Side" |
| 2000 | Walker, Texas Ranger | Lee Chan | Episode: "The General's Return" |
| 2000 | Chicago Hope | Sam | Episode: "Have I Got a Deal for You" |
| 2001 | The Ellen Show | Kwan | Episode: "Pilot" |
| 2001 | Philly | Brian Chin | 2 episodes |
| 2001–02 | Judging Amy | Dr. Oliver Lee | 2 episodes |
| 2001–03 | The Division | Officer Jim Chang | 4 episodes |
| 2002 | Strong Medicine | Dr. Nakashima | Episode: "House Calls" |
| 2003 | Luis | Zhing Zhang | Main role |
| 2004 | Frankenfish | Anton | TV movie |
| 2005 | Blind Justice | Don Yun | Episode: "Seoul Man" |
| 2006 | Night Stalker | Stanley Kim | Episode: "What's the Frequency, Colchak?" |
| 2006–07 | Prison Break | William "Bill" Kim | recurring, 16 episodes |
| 2008 | NCIS | Jonathan Chow | Episode: "Stakeout" |
| 2010 | No Ordinary Family | Dr. Francis Chiles | 5 episodes |
| 2010 | Persons Unknown | Tom | recurring, 7 episodes |
| 2010–25 | American Dad! | Hideki Yoshida (voice) | 7 episodes |
| 2011 | White Collar | Ambassador Kyi | Episode: "What Happens in Burma" |
| 2011–17 | Grimm | Sgt. Drew Wu | Main role |
| 2017 | Hawaii Five-0 | Joey Kang | Episode: "E uhi wale no 'a'ole e nalo, he imu puhi" |
| 2017–19 | Brooklyn Nine-Nine | Dr. Ronald Yee | 2 episodes |
| 2018 | LA to Vegas | Lewis | Episode: "The Affair" |
| 2018 | NCIS: New Orleans | Special Agent Steven Thompson | 2 episodes |
| 2018–19 | Fresh Off the Boat | Julius | 2 episodes |
| 2019–21; 2023 | All Rise | Thomas Choi | Recurring role (Season 1), Main role (Season 2), Guest role (Season 3) |
| 2021 | The Rookie | Mike Weston | Episode: "Red Hot" |
| 2022 | Law and Order: Special Victims Unit | Paul Lee | Episode: "Did You Believe in Miracles?" |
| 2022 | The Lincoln Lawyer | Angelo Soto | 5 episodes |
| 2024 | CSI: Vegas | Undersheriff Zhao | 2 episodes |

=== Video games ===
| Year | Title | Role | Notes |
|---|---|---|---|
| 2007 | Pirates of the Caribbean: At World's End | Tai Huang | Voice and likeness |
