= List of Grimm characters =

The following is a list of the cast and characters from the NBC television series Grimm.

== Main characters ==
Actor	Character	Seasons					
Actor	Character	1	2	3	4	5	6
David Giuntoli	Nicholas "Nick" Burkhardt	Main	Main	Main	Main	Main	Main
Russell Hornsby	Hank Griffin	Main	Main	Main	Main	Main	Main
Elizabeth Tulloch	Juliette Silverton / Eve	Main	Main	Main	Main	Main	Main
Silas Weir Mitchell	Monroe	Main	Main	Main	Main	Main	Main
Sasha Roiz	Captain Sean Renard	Main	Main	Main	Main	Main	Main
Reggie Lee	Sergeant Drew Wu	Main	Main	Main	Main	Main	Main
Bree Turner	Rosalee Calvert	Recurring	Main	Main	Main	Main	Main
Claire Coffee	Adalind Schade	Recurring	Main	Main	Main	Main	Main

=== Nick Burkhardt ===
Nicholas Burkhardt (played by David Giuntoli) is the show's protagonist and titular Grimm. A homicide detective in Portland, Oregon, he starts seeing disturbing and inexplicable things; ordinary faces seem to become animal-like or monstrous. Returning home from work (in the pilot episode) he finds his Aunt Marie making dinner with his girlfriend Juliette. Marie discreetly explains to Nick, that she too, and all Grimms, are able to see theriomorphic people known as Wesen, and have an ancient responsibility to kill those Wesen who pose threats to humanity.

=== Hank Griffin ===
Hank Griffin (played by Russell Hornsby) is Nick's detective partner. Hank has no hint that Grimms or Wesen exist, until, by way of his association with Nick, that world is slowly revealed to him.

=== Juliette Silverton ===
Dr. Juliette Silverton (played by Bitsie Tulloch) is a veterinarian who loves Nick and has lived with him for 3 years. She is smart, patient, and kind, yet courageous and self-determined. She is not a Grimm and has no knowledge of the existence of Wesen.

=== Monroe ===
Monroe (played by Silas Weir Mitchell) is a wolf-like Wesen called a Blutbad. After being wrongly accused by Nick of kidnapping, he helps Nick locate the missing child, then patiently becomes Nick's mentor for all things Wesen. The two forge an unexpected, but lasting bond.

=== Sean Renard ===
Sean Renard (played by Sasha Roiz) is the precinct captain. Initially he was in league with Adalind to murder Aunt Marie and steal one of seven mystical keys. He appears to be an ordinary human (Kehrseite) but, it is slowly divulged, that he is a (demi) Zauberbiest and a (demi) Royal.

=== Drew Wu ===
Sergeant Drew Wu (played by Reggie Lee) is the go-to technical expert who provides backgrounds, hard drive contents, and general cyber knowledge to the detectives. He can't resist making a pun at every opportunity.

=== Rosalee Calvert ===
Rosalee Calvert (played by Bree Turner) is a Fuchsbau, a fox-like Wesen. She is first seen in the season 1 episode "Island of Dreams" after her brother Freddy Calvert, an apothecary, is murdered. She comes to Portland to close her brother's "Spice & Tea Shop", but, as an apothecary herself, winds up running it, after becoming smitten with Monroe.

=== Adalind Schade ===
Adalind Schade- Burkardt (played by Claire Coffee) is a Hexenbiest and an attorney. She is a first seen in the pilot episode, when she walks out of a coffeeshop. She has an intensely adversarial relationship with Nick Burkhardt (up until season 5). In season 2, she learns that she is pregnant with Captain Renard's daughter, Diana and in later seasons, she becomes the mother of Nick's son Kelly.

== Recurring characters ==
- Marie Kessler (played by Kate Burton) is Nick's aunt who raised him from age 12 after his parents were killed. She was a librarian by trade and a fierce and fabled Grimm by calling.
- Kelly Kessler Burkhardt (played by Mary Elizabeth Mastrantonio) is Nick's mother, who reappears in his life, 18 years after he was told she died in a car crash. She is a sanguinary and indefatigable Grimm living a life on the run. Her first appearance is in season one's cliffhanger episode "Woman in Black".
- Theresa Rubel (played by Jacqueline Toboni) known as Trubel (pronounced "trouble"), is introduced as a transient teenager in the season 3 episode "Nobody Knows the Trubel I've Seen". Raised in foster care without any understanding of Wesen, she first learns she is a Grimm when she meets Nick and Monroe. She quickly evolves, under Nick's tutelage, to become a powerful and percipient Grimm.
- Dr. Harper (played by Sharon Sachs) is a medical examiner, who gives essential insight into Nick and Hank's early cases, just as Nick is beginning to understand his role as a Grimm.
- Bud Wurstner (played by Danny Bruno) is a beaver-like Wesen, called an Eisbiber. In the season 1 episode "Danse Macabre" Juliette calls him to repair their broken fridge, but he freaks and bolts when he sees Nick. Eventually though, he becomes a friend and ally to both.
- Sergeant Franco (played by Robert Blanche) is a stalwart, uniformed officer who assists the detectives, and is often partnered with Sergeant Wu.
- Catherine Schade (played by Jessica Tuck) is a Hexenbiest and Adalind's mother. She is first seen in the season 1 episode "Love Sick". In the season 2 episode "The Kiss", at the request of former lover Sean Renard, she prepares a potion that will allow Sean to awaken Juliette from her coma, and has a violent clash with Nick's mom Kelly.
- Prince Eric Renard (played by James Frain) is the legitimate half-brother of Sean Renard who seeks to protect the House of Krönenberg through savagery and subterfuge. He first appears in season 2 episode "Bad Teeth".
- Sebastien (played by Christian Lagadec) is a lawyer in the service to The Royal Family, but as a member of the Resistance, he often provides information to Sean Renard regarding The Royals. His final appearance is in the season 3 episode "The Show Must Go On".
- Freddy Calvert (played by Randy Schulman) is a Fuchsbau and apothecary. First seen in the season 1 episode "Organ Grinder" he runs a Tea & Spice Shop, where he surreptitiously sells human organs, as medicine. He also sells (completely legal) recreational drugs to Wesen.
- Ryan Smulson (played by Michael Grant Terry) is an awkward and fawning intern at the Portland police department. His intrusiveness into an investigation involving Wesen torture-murders, where an ancient Grimm symbol was left at each scene, belies an ugly secret.
- Prince Kenneth Alun Goderich Bowes-Lyon (played by Nico Evers-Swindell) took over the search for Diana when Prince Viktor was recalled to Europe. He recruits burgeoning Hexenbiest Juliette to this task. He is bloodthirsty and ruthless, ambushing Nick's mom to meet his goal.
- Pilar (played by Bertila Damas) attempts to help find a missing boy in the episode "La Llorona". She perceives Juliette's suffering and confusion and tries to advise her, but meets with resistance. Pilar is not revealed to be Wesen or Grimm, but she has a sage and intuitive understanding of the supernatural.
- Frau Pech (played by Mary McDonald-Lewis) is a Hexenbiest who encourages Adeline to sell her "very valuable" child to the Royals and introduces her to Stefania.
- Stefania Vaduva Popescu (played by Shohreh Aghdashloo) is a Zigeverisprathes or Queen of Schwartzwald Roma. Introduced in the season 2 episode "Volcanalis", she puts pregnant Adalind through a long and grueling ritual to recover the Hexenbiest powers taken by Nick. In exchange, she demands Adalind's yet-to-be-born child (of royal blood) which she has promised to sell to The Royal Family.
- Baron Samedi (played by Reg E. Cathey) is a Cracher-Mortel, a fugu-like Wesen who was hired by Prince Eric to create a zombie apocalypse (as a distraction) in order to abduct "the Grimm" and abscond with him to Vienna. He was introduced in the season 2 episode "The Walking Dead".
- Royal Crown Prince Viktor Chlodwig zu Schellendorf von Königsburg (aka Viktor Albert Wilhelm George Beckendorf) Played by Alexis Denisof, he is a second cousin of Eric and Sean Renard. Introduced in the season 3 episode "Cold Blooded", Viktor becomes the new Crown Prince after Eric's death. He is tasked by King Frederick Renard with recovering his granddaughter Diana Schade-Renard, by whatever means necessary, and relishes his crimson carte blanche.
- Alexander (played by Spencer Conway) is a "fixer" for the Wesen Council. He comes to Portland to enforce Council law and discovers a "new kind of Grimm" in Nick Burkhart. Their encounters open new avenues of understanding for both.
- Martin Meisner (played by Damien Puckler) is an ordinary human with extraordinary knowledge and skills essential to the resistance. He rescues Adelind from Prince Viktor and helps her bring Diana into the world. He later becomes the Director of Hadrian's Wall in Portland, training both Trubel and Eve to combat Black Claw.
- Eve is an ultra-powerful Hexenbiest, weaponized in the fight against Black Claw, by Meisner for Hadrian's Wall. A former Kehrseite, she is first seen in the season 5 episode "Wesen Nacht". Her identity is revealed in the episode "Eve of Destruction".
- Diana Schade-Renard (played by Isley and Aria Zamora in season 3, Sloane McGinnis in season 4, and Hannah R. Loyd in seasons 5 and 6) is the daughter of Adalind Schade and Sean Renard. She is also the older half-sister of Kelly Schade-Burkhardt. She displays astonishing powers, even in utero, which foretell her extraordinary destiny. She is the linchpin of one of the main story arcs, first hinted at in episode 3 "Beeware".
- Rolek Porter (played by Sam Anderson). First seen in the season 3 episode "My Fair Wesen", Rolek Porter is a dying Grimm, desperate to connect with Nick Burkhardt, to deliver a chest full of Grimm books and weapons, and most importantly, one of the Seven Keys.
- Josh Porter (played by Lucas Near-Verbrugghe) is the non-Grimm son of Rolek Porter. He grudgingly takes his father to see Nick, all the while disparaging what he thinks are his father's delusions and hallucinations of Wesen.
- Elizabeth Lascelles (played by Louise Lombard) is Sean Renard's mother, a Hexenbiest. First seen in the season 4 episode "Thanks for the Memories", she comes to Portland when Renard is shot by Weston Steward and dies. At his hospital bedside, she uses a two-headed snake, to transfer some of her life to her son, reviving him. Then, at Sean's behest, she works with Rosalie and Monroe to reverse Adalind's spell and recover Nick's Grimm powers.
- Henrietta (played by Garcelle Beauvais) is a very powerful and knowledgeable Hexenbiest and lifelong friend of Elizabeth Lascelles. First seen in the season 4 episode "Death Do Us Part", Henrietta gives counsel to Juliette who is disturbed by the side effects of Elizabeth's spell.
- Kelly Burkhardt is the son of Adalind Schade and Nick Burkhardt, named after Nick's mother. He is also the younger, half-brother of Diana Schade-Renard. As a baby he's played by Owynn & Quinn Ingersoll, Emma & Claire Dezellem, and 2+ other sets of uncredited twins. As an adult he's played by Kevin Joy.
- Andrew Dixon is a Kehrseite candidate running for mayor of Portland. His first appearance in the series is the season 5 episode "Wesen Nacht".
- Conrad Bonaparte (played by Shaun Toub) is a Zauberbiest and a founder of Black Claw. He first appeared in the season 5 episode "The Taming of the Wu". He is vicious, extremely powerful, and determined to have Wesen overthrow every Kehrseite government (and culture) on Earth. He sees this global insurrection as a revolution and the raison d'être of Black Claw.

== Creatures ==
The show refers to its numerous creatures as Wesen, which is German for creature or nature. While the species of each creature often has a German name, although disregarding correct spelling or grammatical, most of the Wesen in the series do not exist by these names in Grimms' Fairy Tales. Some creatures have different names in the German synchronization of the series. For example, the Fuchsbau ("fox den") are called fuchsteufel ("fox-devil") in the German translation of the series.

Wesen are theriomorphic humans with certain traits and abilities characteristic in animals or mythological creatures. The non-human traits and abilities appear when Wesen are aggressive or otherwise emotionally agitated, which is referred to as wogeing from the German wogen, meaning surge. According to the character Monroe, normal people can see only the human appearance of a Wesen, not the woged form. However, Wesen can allow themselves to be seen, which is the source of legends and stories passed down as fairy tales by The Brothers Grimm.

The Wesen community has its politics and institutions, led by the Wesen Council which has the functions of judiciary and legislature. Separately, the seven Royal Houses in Europe are aware of the Wesen community in the series and are vying to restore their former influence in the world. There are also the German: Verrat ("betrayal"), a secret police of Wesen working for the Royal Houses to manipulate others in the Wesen community; the Laufer, a Wesen resistance movement against the Royal Houses; and the reapers, assassins mainly concerned with eliminating Grimms. It is never clearly stated in the series whether members of the Royal families are Wesen themselves; however Wesen–Royal romantic relationships are frowned upon.
