= Silas Weir Mitchell (actor) =

American actor (born 1969)

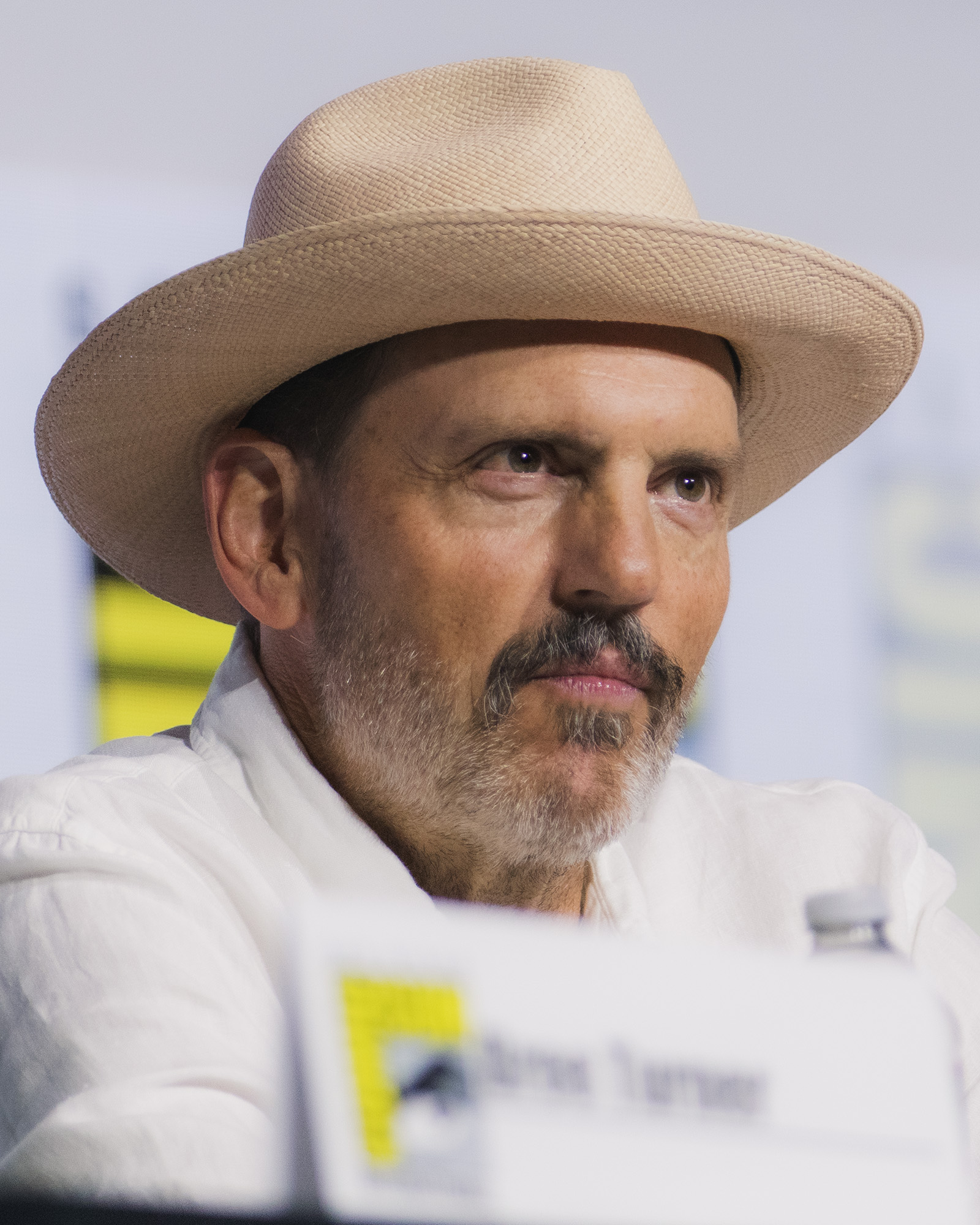
- Mitchell at the 2026 San Diego Comic Con
- Born: Silas Weir Mitchell Neilson; September 30, 1969 (age 56); Philadelphia, Pennsylvania, U.S.
- Education: Brown University (BA); University of California, San Diego (MFA)
- Occupation: Actor
- Years active: 1995–present
- Spouse: K. K. Dodds (div. 2017)
- Relatives: Silas Weir Mitchell (ancestor)

Silas Weir Mitchell (born Silas Weir Mitchell Neilson; September 30, 1969) is an American character actor. He is known for starring as Charles "Haywire" Patoshik in the Fox television series Prison Break (2005–2007), for the recurring role of Donny Jones in My Name Is Earl (2005–2009), and as Monroe in the NBC television series Grimm (2011–2017).

== Early life and education ==
Mitchell was born and raised in Philadelphia, Pennsylvania. He is named after an ancestor, the 19th-century physician and author Silas Weir Mitchell.

He attended The Montgomery County Day School (formerly in Gladwyne, Pennsylvania) for his elementary school years; is a graduate of St. Paul's School, a college-preparatory boarding school in Concord, New Hampshire (1987); Brown University (1991) in Rhode Island, where he majored in Theatre and Religion; and the University of California San Diego, Master of Fine Arts graduate acting program.

After graduating from Brown, he spent some time in New York City, acting in minor theatre productions.

== Career ==
Mitchell has had recurring guest roles in such television series as 24 as Eli Stram; Numb3rs; My Name Is Earl as Earl's ex-con friend Donny Jones; and Prison Break as escapee Charles "Haywire" Patoshik. On the DVD commentary for Prison Break, he mentions he had previously auditioned for the roles of Theodore "T-Bag" Bagwell and Lincoln Burrows. Mitchell plays the role of an insane prison inmate in both Prison Break and My Name Is Earl. He also appears in Rat Race (2001) as Lloyd (The Hardware Store Guy), and in The Whole Ten Yards as Yermo.

One of his most notable roles is that of mentally unstable recurring character James Hogan on Cold Case. Mitchell also made appearances on ER, CSI: Miami, CSI: NY, Law & Order: Special Victims Unit, Burn Notice as charming but unstable arms dealer Seymour, Dexter, Monk, Six Feet Under, The X-Files, The Closer, and Boomtown. He also appeared on the show CSI in the Season 6 episode "Room Service".

In 2008, Silas made an appearance in seventh and final season of the U.S. police procedural show The Shield.

In 2009, he appeared in A Fork in the Road, alongside Jaime King, and in Halloween 2. Mitchell also appeared in Fox's TV show, Mental with Chris Vance, also from Prison Break.

In October 2011, Mitchell was cast as Monroe in the NBC TV series Grimm. He portrayed Monroe throughout the series' six year run.

== Film ==
Year	Film	Role	Notes
1996	Playing Dangerous 2	Gregor Tarnopol	
1997	Private Parts	Patient	
1997	Quicksilver Highway	Bryan Adams	TV movie
1997	Sins of the Mind	Anderson	TV movie
1997	Julian Po	Stonewall	
1998	The Patriot	Pogue	
1998	Route 9	Agent Paul Danning	TV movie
1999	Inferno	Jesse Hogan	
1999	Absence of the Good	Jack Gaskin	TV movie
2000	Other Voices	Weeping Man	
2001	Rat Race	Lloyd	
2002	Johnson County War	Mitch Slaughter	TV movie
2003	A Painted House	Jimmy Dale	TV movie
2004	The Whole Ten Yards	Yermo	
2004	Life on Liberty Street	Derek	TV movie
2005	Heart of the Beholder	Lester	
2005	Detective	Robbins	TV movie
2005	Fathers and Sons	Max (uncredited)	
2005	McBride: Anybody Here Murder Marty?	Joseph Devine	TV movie
2006	Flags of Our Fathers	Lab Tech	
2006	The Phobic	Vladimir Narcijac	
2007	Lesser of Three Evils	Motel Manager	Also known as Fist of the Warrior
2007	The Gray Man	Albert Fish Jr.	
2007	Crazy	Neal	
2008	1%	Wild Man Sam	TV movie
2008	Prairie Fever	Frank	Video
2009	Halloween 2	Chett Johns	
2009	Otis E.	Stanley	
2010	Ticket Out	Levi	
2010	A Fork in the Road	Karl Rogers	
2010	Heaven's Rain	Ake	
2010	Circle	Bennett	
2018	The Amendment	Glenn	
2024	Detained	Sullivan	

== Shorts ==
Year	Film	Role
1999	Bingo	Harry
2002	Ant	Bertrand
2002	Ethan and Alan	Ethan
2009	Waiting for Jevetta	
2010	The Killed	
2010	Sami's Cock	

== Television ==
Year	Series	Role	Episode/s
1995	Silk Stalkings	Peter Raymond Wicker	"The Lonely Hunter"
1995	The Marshal	Willy	"The New Marshal"
1996	The Big Easy	Lyle Tillman	"Big Life"
1997	Caroline in the City	Louis	"Caroline and the New Neighbor"
1997	Dark Skies	Convict	"Strangers in the Night"
1997, 1998	ER	Luis/Marcus Hainey	"Ambush" "Stuck on You"
1997, 2000	NYPD Blue	Tony/Luke	"Remembrance of Humps Past" "Everybody Plays the Mule"
1998	C-16: FBI		"The Art of War"
1998	Vengeance Unlimited	Capt. Jesse Fisher	"Dishonorable Discharge"
1999	The X-Files	Dougie	"Agua Mala"
1999	The Pretender	Luke Carlo	"Risque Business"
2000	Other Voices	Weeping Man	
2000	The Practice	Anthony Brickman	"New Evidence" "Hammerhead Sharks"
2000	Nash Bridges	Roy McNair	"Jackpot: Part 1" "Jackpot: Part 2"
2002	The Agency		"The Golden Hour"
2002	24	Eli Stram	5 episodes
2002	Push, Nevada	Ruhk	"The Black Box"
2002	Birds of Prey	Syrus Waters (Slick)	"Slick"
2002	Boomtown	Erik Sorenson	"Coyote"
2003	Six Feet Under	Dion Corelli	"The Trap"
2003, 2005	Cold Case	James Hogan	"Sherry Darlin'" "Kensington"
2004	CSI: Miami	Ralph Durst	"Stalkerazzi"
2004	Crossing Jordan	Frank Jones/Alastair Dark	"Revealed"
2005	Medium	Deranged Husband	"A Couple of Choices"
2005	JAG	Reese Pardee	"Two Towns"
2005	CSI: NY	David Scott	"Crime and Misdemeanor"
2005	Fathers and Sons	Max (uncredited)	
2005	Strong Medicine	Wade	"Paternity Test"
2005	CSI: Crime Scene Investigation	Willie Angel	"Room Service"
2005–2007	Prison Break	Charles "Haywire" Patoshik	13 episodes
2005–2008	My Name Is Earl	Donny Jones	6 episodes
2006	The PTA		"Can't Do"
2006	Monk	Drugstore Manager	"Mr. Monk and the Garbage Strike"
2006	Without a Trace	Luke Seaver	"The Things with Feathers"
2007	Lesser of Three Evils	Motel Manager	Also known as Fist of the Warrior
2007	Dexter	Ken Olson	"Dex, Lies, and Videotape"
2008	Prairie Fever	Frank	Video
2008	The Closer	Father Chris Donahue	"Tijuana Brass"
2008	The Shield	Father Morton	"Parricide"
2008	Burn Notice	Seymour	"Rough Seas" "Seek and Destroy"
2009	Law & Order: Special Victims Unit	Owen Walters	"Liberties"
2009	Mental	Vincent Martin	"Pilot"
2009	Otis E.	Stanley	
2009	Numb3rs	Darren Drew	"Dreamland"
2010	Ticket Out	Levi	
2010	A Fork in the Road	Karl Rogers	
2010	Circle	Bennett	
2010	The Good Guys	Vic	"Little Things"
2011	The Mentalist	Arthur Coffey/Ralph Mercer	"Bloodhounds"
2011–2017	Grimm	Monroe	Main cast
2020	Paradise Lost	Boyd Suttree	Main cast
2020	S.W.A.T.	Phil Winters	Season 4, episode 10
2023, 2025–2026	Criminal Minds	Cyrus LeBrun	Season 16, episode 5 & 6; Season 18, episode 7; Season 19, episode 3
2024	Law & Order: Special Victims Unit	Boyd Lynch	Season 26, episode 8
