= Grimm season 2 =

Grimm
- Season 2
- Region 1 DVD cover art
- No. of episodes: 22

Release
- Original network: NBC
- Original release: August 13, 2012 – May 21, 2013

Season chronology
- ← Previous; Season 1 Next → Season 3

The second season of the NBC American supernatural drama series Grimm premiered on August 13, 2012, and consisted of 22 episodes. The series, created by David Greenwalt, Jim Kouf and Stephen Carpenter, follows a descendant of the Grimm line, Nick Burkhardt, as he deals with being a cop, and trying not to expose his secret as a Grimm.

== Cast ==
=== Main cast ===
- David Giuntoli as Nick Burkhardt
- Russell Hornsby as Hank Griffin
- Bitsie Tulloch as Juliette Silverton
- Silas Weir Mitchell as Monroe
- Sasha Roiz as Captain Sean Renard
- Reggie Lee as Sergeant Drew Wu
- Bree Turner as Rosalee Calvert
- Claire Coffee as Adalind Schade (regular from episode 12 onwards, recurring previously)

=== Recurring cast ===
- Robert Blanche as Franco
- Danny Bruno as Bud Wurstner
- Christian Lagadec as Sebastien
- James Frain as Eric Renard
- Mary McDonald-Lewis as Frau Pech
- Sharon Sachs as Dr. Harper
- Shohreh Aghdashloo as Stefania Vaduva Popescu
- Michael Grant Terry as Ryan Smulson
- Bertila Damas as Pilar
- Reg E. Cathey as Baron Samedi
- Mary Elizabeth Mastrantonio as Kelly Burkhardt
- Jessica Tuck as Catherine Schade
- Lisa Vidal as Lauren Castro
- Mike Dopud as Marnassier
- Jim Crino as Leroy Estes
- Robert Alan Barnett as Matthew

== Production ==
On March 16, 2012, NBC announced that the series had been renewed for a second season with a 22-episode order. Bree Turner, who plays Rosalee Calvert, joined the main cast from the beginning of season two. Production began on May 30 for an August 13 premiere. Claire Coffee, who plays Adalind Schade, was also upgraded to a series regular for season two, starting from episode 12.

The first four episodes debuted on Monday nights at 10 pm before moving back to Friday nights at 9 pm starting September 28. The fall finale aired on November 16. New episodes returned on March 8, 2013. The show was moved to Tuesday nights beginning with episode 19.

Russell Hornsby injured his Achilles tendon near the end of production of the second season. His character was written out as "on vacation" for two episodes ("Volcanalis" and "Endangered") to give Hornsby time to undergo surgery.

== Episodes ==
No. overall	No. in season	Title	Directed by	Written by	Original release date	Prod. code	US viewers (millions)
23	1	"Bad Teeth"	Norberto Barba	Jim Kouf & David Greenwalt	August 13, 2012	201	5.64
Nick learns that his mother has come back, to save him; Juliette is still in her coma from the spell that Adalind put her under, while Monroe and Rosalee work against the clock to try to wake her up. Nick is on the case of a man found murdered in the harbor, and his mother believes that she can help. When the beast that killed that man attacks the FBI agents working the case, he lures Nick there so that he can kill him. When Nick arrives, the beast comes up behind him. Opening quote: "The blood-dimmed tide is loosed, and everywhere the ceremony of innocence is drowned."
24	2	"The Kiss"	Terrence O'Hara	Jim Kouf & David Greenwalt	August 20, 2012	202	4.90
Nick's mother kills the beast and Nick goes to the hospital to give the potion that will stop Juliette's memory loss. He then gets called to investigate the homicide he was just at and has to cover for his mother. Meanwhile, Catherine gets ingredients from Rosalee and makes a potion before calling Capt. Renard to come over. She gives him the potion and says that it will purify him, as only someone pure of heart can wake Juliette. After taking the potion, Capt. Renard kisses Juliette and wakes her up. Nick goes to the hospital to visit her, but the memory loss is already too advanced, and she does not recognize him. Opening quote: "If a man of pure heart were to fall in love with her, that would bring her back to life."
25	3	"Bad Moon Rising"	David Solomon	Richard Hatem	August 27, 2012	203	4.67
An old friend of Hank's asks for help when his daughter goes missing. The friend's in-laws have kidnapped the daughter for a mating ceremony. Juliette's memory loss seems only to affect solely her memories of Nick after immediately recognizing Monroe when he visits. Hank learns the truth of his best friend, and Nick's secret as a Grimm when cornered in a barn, but is alright in accepting this reality. Juliette is released from the hospital, but Nick remains saddened that she has no feelings for him and no memory of their relationship. Opening quote: "Then she began to weep bitterly, and said, 'What can a poor girl like me do now?"
26	4	"Quill"	David Straiton	David Simkins	September 3, 2012	204	4.62
During the middle of an investigation of an accident site, Nick discovers a Wesen disease that is quickly spreading. After killing a Reinigen, Nick suspects there is something else going on because of the looks of the creature. After doing some research in the books in his trailer, Nick finds out the disease is the "yellow plague", it only effects Wesen and not regular humans. Monroe and Rosalee go on a date and comes to a turn when they come across an infected creature. Meanwhile, Captain Renard gets a tip about a dangerous fugitive that has arrived to Portland – he is looking for Nick. Opening quote: "Death stood behind him, and said: 'Follow me, the hour of your departure from this world has come.'"
27	5	"The Good Shepherd"	Steven DePaul	Dan E. Fesman	September 28, 2012	205	5.32
When a Wesen church gets money stolen from an online bank account, Nick and Monroe investigate the members of the church for suspicious and unusual activity. Later, once again, another dangerous opponent targets Nick in search for the key. Opening quote: "Dressed in the skin, the wolf strolled into the pasture with the Sheep. Soon a little Lamb was following him about and was quickly led away to slaughter."
28	6	"Over My Dead Body"	Rob Bailey	Spiro Skentzos	October 5, 2012	206	5.29
Angelina (Jaime Ray Newman) comes back to Portland with some bad news, she has been hired to kill Monroe. Angelina however does not want to kill him, but if she chooses to kill him she gets $25,000. If she does not kill him the people who hired her will kill her and she will not get the money. Nick asks Hank for help for Monroe's care. Meanwhile, Captain Renard gets an unexpected visitor (Alice Evans). Rosalee asks Monroe to run the shop while she is gone helping her aunt, Monroe says yes. Opening quote: "Whilst he thus gazed before him, he saw a snake creep out of a corner of the vault and approach the dead body."
29	7	"The Bottle Imp"	Darnell Martin	Alan DiFiore	October 12, 2012	207	5.01
Hank and Nick's current investigation is on a seemingly-unstable man who is on the run with his daughter; Monroe realizes that filling in for Rosalee at her shop will be harder than he thought. Meanwhile with a conversation between Captain Renard and Adalind, Adalind is wondering who killed her mother. Captain Renard asks where she was, she responds that it was some place he would not find her, and Renard suggests she should come back to Portland to discuss the issues that have been occurring. Opening quote: "Let me out, let me out,' the spirit cried. And the boy, thinking no evil, drew the cork out of the bottle."
30	8	"The Other Side"	Eric Laneuville	William Bigelow	October 19, 2012	208	5.03
Hank and Nick investigate a competition at a local high school that soon turns deadly after a murder of a boy. Meanwhile, Captain Renard faces a very unexpected and unwanted infatuation with Juliette; he goes to Rosalee's shop to try to find a cure so he will stop thinking about Juliette, and Monroe tells him (since Rosalee is gone helping her aunt) that his obsessive behavior will get worse as the days go on if he does not do something about it. Adalind Schade's current location is revealed. Opening quote: "I thought of making myself a beautiful wooden marionette. It must be wonderful, one that can dance, fence and turn somersaults."
31	9	"La Llorona"	Holly Dale	Akela Cooper	October 26, 2012	209	6.11
A series of horrifying child attack and abductions at Halloween pairs Nick and Hank with Valentina Espinosa, a mysterious detective, and Juliette, who joins as the Spanish translator. The more Nick digs into the case, the more he realizes the pattern of the kidnapping matches those in the famed Mexican horror story "La Llorona", a story Nick's ancestors investigated to no avail. Meanwhile, Monroe celebrates the holiday in fine style as he teaches the neighborhood bullies a lesson. Opening quote: "On many a dark night people would see her walking along the riverbank and crying for her children."
32	10	"The Hour of Death"	Peter Werner	Sean Calder	November 2, 2012	210	5.64
When a brutal vigilante homicide is made public, it sends Portland’s Wesen community into a frenzy. As Nick investigates further, he discovers a pattern similar to that of a particularly brutal line of past Grimms. Is there another Grimm in town, or is Nick dealing with a sadistic copycat? Meanwhile, Captain Renard takes it upon himself to offer Juliette comfort in handling her ongoing dilemma with Nick. Opening quote: "And branded upon the beast, the mark of his kin. For none shall live whom they have seen." (Source: The fictional in-universe work Albträume für Wesen Kinder, meaning Nightmares for Wesen Children in English.)
33	11	"To Protect and Serve Man"	Omar Madha	Dan E. Fesman	November 9, 2012	211	5.21
Hank starts reflecting on an arrest he made earlier in his career regarding a man who committed murder claiming "self-defense against monsters". With the man’s death sentence rapidly approaching and the knowledge he’s recently gathered from Nick, Hank begins to wonder if there was more truth to the man’s seemingly absurd story then he once thought. Back at the spice shop, Monroe finds himself involved in a situation he never saw coming. Opening quote: "The beast was simply the Call of the Wild personified... which some natures hear to their own destruction."
34	12	"Season of the Hexenbiest"	Karen Gaviola	Story by : Jim Kouf; Teleplay by : Jim Kouf & David Greenwalt	November 16, 2012	212	5.03
Adalind returns to wreak havoc in everyone’s lives and avenge her mother’s brutal death. She has her eyes set on Nick and those closest to him – especially Hank and Juliette. Elsewhere, Captain Renard’s obsession continues to escalate. Meanwhile, a surprise visit at the spice shop gives Monroe more than he ever bargained for. The future of Aunt Marie's trailer is in jeopardy. Opening quote: "Oh! There is a terrible witch in that house who spewed her poison over me and scratched me with her long fingernails."
35	13	"Face Off"	Terrence O'Hara	Jim Kouf & David Greenwalt	March 8, 2013	213	4.90
After Nick learns about Juliette and Captain Renard, he must deal with the consequences. Things get even more complicated when Nick is called to investigate his own crime. Meanwhile, the search for the key intensifies as Captain Renard tries to stop what’s going on with him and Juliette before it goes too far. Elsewhere, Wu responds to a bizarre shooting at Nick and Juliette’s house. Opening quote: "The will to conquer is the first condition of victory."
36	14	"Natural Born Wesen"	Michael Watkins	Thomas Ian Griffith & Mary Page Keller	March 15, 2013	214	4.91
The Wesen code of honor comes into question when Nick, Hank and Monroe discover a series of bank robberies with Wesen using true natures as their disguises. Meanwhile, Juliette finds herself tormented by faint, slowly returning memories that cause her to question her mental state. Opening quote: "So the animals debated how they might drive the robbers out, and at last settled on an idea."
37	15	"Mr. Sandman"	Norberto Barba	Alan DiFiore	March 22, 2013	215	5.00
As Nick and Hank investigate a case of sudden blindness leading to a woman's death, they come across a Wesen that feeds off its victim's tears. Rosalee continues to work with Juliette in order to fix her memory. Opening quote: "Now we've got eyes — eyes — a beautiful pair of children's eyes," he whispered.
38	16	"Nameless"	Charles Haid	Akela Cooper	March 29, 2013	216	4.86
After helping fix the code for a new video game to get it in for a deadline, a gamer and I.T. genius seeks revenge from those who refused to give him credit for the game. He kills the coders' characters and then splits them in half. Meanwhile, Juliette asks Monroe and Rosalee to spend time with her so that she can tell them her visions when they come to her. Monroe accidentally reveals that one of the visions is of Nick in Aunt Marie's trailer, and Juliette demands they take her there, as she believes it will recover her memory. Opening quote: "Then he seized his left foot with both hands in such a fury that he split in two."
39	17	"One Angry Fuchsbau"	Terrence O'Hara	Richard Hatem	April 5, 2013	217	5.13
During jury duty, Rosalee seeks Nick, Hank and Monroe's help to stop a defense attorney with peculiar powers of persuasion on cases that should be quickly resolved. Meanwhile, Monroe, with Nick's permission, takes Juliette to the trailer which causes a cavalcade of memories to rush back to her. Opening quote: "He sang a sweet song in tones so full and soft that no human ear could resist them nor fathom their origin..." (Source: The quotation is inspired by, but not actually from "The Garden of Paradise".)
40	18	"Volcanalis"	David Grossman	Jim Kouf & David Greenwalt	April 26, 2013	218	4.85
When a geologist on Mount Hood is killed, Nick, Monroe, and Renard must team up with a new ally to stop a living volcano from destroying Portland. Meanwhile, Juliette finally regains control over her memories. Opening quote: "The demon came home, and he declared that the air was not clear. 'I smell the flesh of man."
41	19	"Endangered"	David Straiton	Spiro Skentzos	April 30, 2013	219	5.77
Mysterious cow mutilations and reports of glowing creatures put Nick on a case that forces him to question the existence of aliens within the Wesen world. He also meets a strange UFO expert who seems to know more than he’s letting on. Meanwhile, Nick digs further into the key, and Juliette's romantic memories of Nick start coming back in a big way. Opening quote: "They'll kill you, and I'll be here in the woods all alone and abandoned."
42	20	"Kiss of the Muse"	Tawnia McKiernan	Sean Calder	May 7, 2013	220	5.67
Nick discovers a muse-like Wesen with the ability to influence those she gets close to – some with positive results, others with terrifying ones. Nick must find a way to get close without losing himself in the process. Juliette arranges a dinner date with Nick wanting to apologize to him for her bad behavior, but it goes awry as the case intensifies. Meanwhile, Rosalee takes her first visit to Aunt Marie’s trailer. Opening quote: "Tell me O'Muse, from whatsoever source you may know them."
43	21	"The Waking Dead"	Steven DePaul	Jim Kouf & David Greenwalt	May 14, 2013	221	5.36
Nick and Hank discover a new kind of strange when they investigate suspects being found dead – for the second time. In Europe, Adalind finds herself in the middle of a feud between Frau Pech and Stefania while working over the details of her pending transaction. Meanwhile, determined to remember every last detail to get things started once more, Juliette insists Monroe share with her Nick’s darkest secret – the world of Grimms and Wesen. Opening quote: "Papa Ghede is a handsom fellow in his hat and coat of black. Papa Ghede is going to the palace! He'll eat and drink when he gets back!"
44	22	"Goodnight, Sweet Grimm"	Norberto Barba	Jim Kouf & David Greenwalt	May 21, 2013	222	4.99
Nick investigates a series of rage-fueled assaults; Nick learns Captain Sean Renard's half brother named Eric Renard is in town. Stefania and Frau Pech battle each other using their alliances with Adalind. During a confrontation with the Baron, Nick falls into a trap resulting in his own zombie-like coma. Opening quote: "And flights of angels sing thee to thy rest."

== Ratings ==
No. in series	No. in season	Title	Air Date	Timeslot (ET)	Rating/Share 18–49	Viewers (million)	DVR 18–49	DVR Viewers (millions)	Total 18–49	Total Viewers (millions)
23	1	Bad Teeth	August 13, 2012	Monday; 10:00 P.M.	2.0/5	5.64	—N/a	—N/a	—N/a	—N/a
24	2	The Kiss	August 20, 2012	Monday; 10:00 P.M.	1.7/5	4.90	—N/a	—N/a	—N/a	—N/a
25	3	Bad Moon Rising	August 27, 2012	Monday; 10:00 P.M.	1.6/4	4.67	—N/a	—N/a	—N/a	—N/a
26	4	Quill	September 3, 2012	Monday; 10:00 P.M.	1.5/4	4.62	—N/a	—N/a	—N/a	—N/a
27	5	The Good Shepherd	September 28, 2012	Friday; 9:00 P.M.	1.6/4	5.32	1.3	2.92	2.9	8.24
28	6	Over My Dead Body	October 5, 2012	Friday; 9:00 P.M.	1.6/5	5.29	1.2	2.55	2.8	7.84
29	7	The Bottle Imp	October 12, 2012	Friday; 9:00 P.M.	1.6/5	5.01	1.2	2.67	2.8	7.69
30	8	The Other Side	October 19, 2012	Friday; 9:00 P.M.	1.5/5	5.03	1.3	2.75	2.8	7.79
31	9	La Llorona	October 26, 2012	Friday; 9:00 P.M.	2.0/6	6.11	1.2	2.84	3.2	8.93
32	10	The Hour of Death	November 2, 2012	Friday; 9:00 P.M.	1.8/5	5.64	1.1	2.48	2.9	8.17
33	11	To Protect and Serve Man	November 9, 2012	Friday; 9:00 P.M.	1.7/5	5.21	1.2	2.87	2.9	8.08
34	12	Season of the Hexenbiest	November 16, 2012	Friday; 9:00 P.M.	1.6/5	5.03	1.2	2.97	2.8	8.00
35	13	Face Off	March 8, 2013	Friday; 9:00 P.M.	1.5/5	4.90	1.2	2.80	2.7	7.71
36	14	Natural Born Wesen	March 15, 2013	Friday; 9:00 P.M.	1.4/5	4.91	1.1	2.53	2.5	7.44
37	15	Mr. Sandman	March 22, 2013	Friday; 9:00 P.M.	1.4/4	5.00	1.0	2.39	2.4	7.39
38	16	Nameless	March 29, 2013	Friday; 9:00 P.M.	1.4/4	4.86	1.1	2.71	2.5	7.53
39	17	One Angry Fuchsbau	April 5, 2013	Friday; 9:00 P.M.	1.5/5	5.13	1.2	2.78	2.7	7.91
40	18	Volcanalis	April 26, 2013	Friday; 9:00 P.M.	1.3/4	4.85	0.9	2.15	2.2	6.98
41	19	Endangered	April 30, 2013	Tuesday; 10:00 P.M.	1.9/5	5.77	1.2	2.90	3.1	8.67
42	20	Kiss of the Muse	May 7, 2013	Tuesday; 10:00 P.M.	1.8/5	5.68	1.1	2.74	2.9	8.42
43	21	The Waking Dead	May 14, 2013	Tuesday; 10:00 P.M.	1.7/5	5.36	1.3	3.11	3.0	8.47
44	22	Goodnight, Sweet Grimm	May 21, 2013	Tuesday; 10:00 P.M.	1.7/5	4.99	1.0	2.79	2.7	7.79

== DVD release ==
Grimm – The Complete Second Season
Set Details	Special Features
22 Episodes; 5-Disc Set; English (Dolby Digital 5.1 Surround); Audio Commentaries	Deleted Scenes; Gag Reel; Grimm: Myths, Monsters & Legends – Learn about the ever-expanding mythology of Grimm as producers and cast discuss the richness of the show's storylines, covering this season's terrifying Wesen, the Seven Royal Families, and the mysteries of Aunt Marie's trailer; Grimm: Creatures and Chaos – Watch as the creatures of Grimm morph and wreak havoc on anyone – or anything – in their path; "Bad Hair Day" Webisodes: A fellow Wesen visits Rosalee's spice shop looking for a hair-loss cure in this 4-part series; Monroe's Best Moments: Revisit the quips and quibbles that makes Monroe our favorite Wesen; (Blu-ray Only) Grimm Guide: An interactive book that provides insight into the various creatures featured in the show; (Blu-ray Only) Extended Episode – Featuring never-before-seen footage of the episode "Over My Dead Body"
Release Dates
Region 1	Region 2
September 17, 2013	October 28, 2013
