= La Llorona (Grimm) =

- Grimm episode
- Episode no.: Season 2 Episode 9
- Directed by: Holly Dale
- Written by: Akela Cooper
- Cinematography by: Marshall Adams
- Editing by: Tim Brinker; Casey Rohrs
- Production code: 209
- Original air date: October 26, 2012
- Running time: 42 minutes

Guest appearances
- Kate del Castillo as Detective Valentina Espinosa; Angela Alvarado as La Llorona; David Barrera as Luis Alvarez; Bertila Damas as Pilar; Michael Grant Terry as Ryan Smulson; Robert Blanche as Sgt. Franco

Episode chronology
← Previous "The Other Side"	Next → "The Hour of Death"
- Grimm season 2

"La Llorona" is the 9th episode of the second season of the supernatural drama television series Grimm, which premiered on October 26, 2012, on NBC. The episode was written by Akela Cooper, and was directed by Holly Dale.

The episode was broadcast on NBC as a Halloween special. In this episode Nick and Hank investigate a case that holds a striking resemblance to a Mexican legend: La Llorona. With the help of a New Mexico detective, Nick and Hank are faced with a chain of supernatural kidnappings. Meanwhile, Monroe hosts a Halloween-themed garden party for the children of his neighborhood.

== Plot ==
Opening Quote: "On many a dark night people would see her walking along the riverbank and crying for her children."

On the eve of Halloween, Luis Alvarez (David Barrera) spends time with his son Rafael. Luis is distracted when a mysterious crying woman in white wades into a river, apparently trying to kill herself. He follows, but can't find her. He turns to watch helplessly as she leads Rafael away by hand. Nick (David Giuntoli) and Hank (Russell Hornsby) investigate the case. Luis cannot speak English, so Nick calls Juliette (Bitsie Tulloch) to help translate.

Nick, Hank and Juliette come to Luis' home, looking for evidence of any possible suspect. Luis' neighbor Pilar (Bertila Damas) tells Juliette that the kidnapper is La Llorona ("The Weeping Woman") - a female ghost who, in several Hispanic legends, takes children and drowns them in a river. In a private moment, Pilar warns Juliette that her cat scratch is a sign that someone has cursed her. Nick asks Juliette to stay with Luis until another translator can be found.

In Albuquerque, a jaguar-like Wesen (Kate del Castillo) sees an alert on her computer about the kidnapping and leaves immediately for Portland. At the Portland precinct, she is revealed to be detective Valentina Espinoza, who claims extensive experience with the kidnapper. She tells Captain Renard (Sasha Roiz) that the woman is a serial killer, and warns a second and then a third child abduction will soon follow.

On another Portland river, La Llorona kidnaps a girl, whom she takes to her lair to join Rafael. Renard orders Nick and Hank to place Valentina in custody, following a request from the FBI. Knowing she is Wesen, Nick prevents her from attacking the captain. Renard interrogates her: she warns him of a third abduction and claims the woman was responsible for her own nephew's death. Renard declares she will be detained until the FBI are ready to speak to her.

Nick and Hank go to Aunt Marie's trailer, where they learn that none of Nick's ancestors were able to determine who La Llorona was. They decide to free Valentina and start working with her. They learn that La Llorona drowns children at a point called abrazo del río ("river's embrace"), where the two rivers connect.

La Llorona takes the children (including a third she has taken) to the abrazo, intending to drown them and in so doing bring her own children back from the dead. The process is interrupted by the arrival of Nick, Hank and Valentina. Nick dives into the water to fight La Llorona. She disappears right before his eyes. Back in the precinct, the children are reunited with their parents. Renard gently chastises Nick and Hank for their insubordination, saying the FBI has taken some of the credit and should be content with the result.

In a minor sub-plot, Monroe (Silas Weir Mitchell) celebrates Halloween by decorating his home and holding an event for children. Afterwards, some children - bullies whom he had prevented from stealing candy from a little girl - break one of his windows. As the episode ends, Monroe scares them with a Halloween "trick": he briefly woges into his Wesen form.

== Reception ==
=== Ratings ===
The episode received a 2.06 18–49 ratings share and was watched by 6.11 million viewers, a marked increase from the previous episode. The episode premiered after the now cancelled show, Mockingbird Lane.

=== Critical reception ===
The episode was met with mixed to positive reviews.

Emily Rome of Entertainment Weekly gave it a mixed review since she was surprised by the elements in the episode: "Well, lo and behold, Grimm delivered a compelling case-of-the-week in tonight's episode, though it may have not been compelling for the reasons we were hoping for (more on that later)."

Kevin McnFarland of The A.V. Club rated the episode a B+, stating, "This is an example of how to use a popular folktale well; this is the model for episodic storytelling in a supernatural setting. A “Very Special Episode” of Grimm around Halloween is basically a must because of the show’s premise. It features streamlined and functional investigation from Nick and Hank, an intriguing guest star in Valentina, the bluish cat Wesen and disgraced detective obsessed with the La Llorona abductions, and even blends in a useful and compelling Juliette storyline to boot."
