= The Hour of Death =

- Grimm episode
- Episode no.: Season 2 Episode 10
- Directed by: Peter Werner
- Written by: Sean Calder
- Cinematography by: Eliot Rockett
- Editing by: Chris Willingham
- Production code: 210
- Original air date: November 2, 2012
- Running time: 42 minutes

Guest appearances
- Michael Grant Terry as Ryan Smulson; Michael Maize as Adrian Zayne; Robert Blanche as Sgt. Franco; Danny Bruno as Bud Wurstner

Episode chronology
← Previous "La Llorona"	Next → "To Protect and Serve Man"
- Grimm season 2

"The Hour of Death" is the tenth episode of the supernatural drama television series Grimm of season 2 and the 32nd overall, which premiered on November 2, 2012, on NBC. The episode was written by Sean Calder, and was directed by Peter Werner.

== Plot ==
Opening quote: "And branded upon the beast, the mark of his kin. For none shall live whom they have seen."

Nick (David Giuntoli) and Hank (Russell Hornsby) are investigating the kidnapping of a girl named Donna Reynolds. They have a suspect, Adrian Zayne (Michael Maize). They question him but he panics: he woges into a Schakal and tries to escape, but Nick and Hank apprehend him.

Zayne is released due to lack of evidence, although Nick threatens him as a Grimm. Nick sneaks into his house in an attempt to find evidence and stumbles upon Hank doing the same. They discover Zayne's corpse hanging with symbols burned onto his body. Other police arrive, and Wu (Reggie Lee) informs them that Zayne confessed to the kidnapping and that Donna has been saved.

Watching the report on television, Monroe (Silas Weir Mitchell) and Bud (Danny Bruno) are shocked to see the symbols. Monroe tells Nick that the symbols identify Endezeichen Grimms, who are heartless and kill any Wesen in their path. As Nick is the only known Grimm in Portland, the Wesen will assume he is the killer. Renard (Sasha Roiz) meets with Juliette (Bitsie Tulloch) to discuss Nick. After they unintentionally flirt, she becomes uncomfortable and leaves.

A video of Zayne's torture is uploaded to the Internet. Police identify one of the vans in the video as belonging to Richard Berna (Michael Patten), a friend of Zayne's. Nick and Hank arrest him but he is worried that Nick will kill him, thinking he is the Endezeichen Grimm. He is somehow released and police raid his house, only to discover his corpse. Nick is taunted by the Endezeichen Grimm on the phone. They find out that it was the new intern, Ryan (Michael Grant Terry), who released Richard, and that he went after Bud. They discover that Ryan has been stalking Nick.

Nick and Hank locate Bud in a warehouse and Nick chases Ryan. Ryan confronts Nick for his being friends with Wesen. Idolizing the brutality of the Endezeichen, Ryan can't comprehend that they are extremists and not the standard for all Grimms. He woges into Lebensauger form, revealing he is not Grimm. Consumed with self-loathing, he begs to be killed. Nick arrests him. Wu remarks that they need better psychological evaluations for interns. Renard visits Juliette and, after some tension, they kiss. Juliette realizes he was the one who kissed her in the hospital, and they kiss again. Confused and conflicted, she closes the door in his face.

== Reception ==
=== Viewers ===
The episode was viewed by 5.64 million people, earning a 1.8/5 in the 18-49 rating demographics on the Nielson ratings scale, ranking second on its timeslot and fourth for the night in the 18-49 demographics, behind Last Man Standing, Shark Tank and Malibu Country. This was an 8% decrease in viewership from the previous episode, which was watched by 6.11 million viewers with a 2.0/6. This means that 1.8 percent of all households with televisions watched the episode, while 5 percent of all households watching television at that time watched it. With DVR factoring in, the episode was watched by 8.17 million viewers with a 2.9 ratings share in the 18-49 demographics.

=== Critical reviews ===
"The Hour of Death" received positive reviews. The A.V. Club's Kevin McFarland gave the episode a "B+" grade and wrote, "When Ryan the intern showed up a few weeks ago, it was unclear exactly what purpose he would serve. His entrance was highlighted to designate him as important, but then he lingered in the background for several weeks, knocking over a water cooler, enduring Sgt. Wu's mockery — and if the show had kept up that long con any longer, it would've been frustrating to waste that kind of screen time. But even though I saw the twist coming a few scenes before it happened, I never expected Grimm to take the turn it did, in one deft move revealing Ryan to be a formidable villain for an episode. This is Grimm at its darkest and most in tune with how to blend Nick's responsibilities as a cop with his hidden identity as a Grimm, and even with a handful of quibbles, it makes for a gripping procedural."

Emily Rome of EW wrote, "Oh, boy, Grimm, way to get so... grim. In what may be the show's darkest episode yet, Nick learns more than he probably wanted to about his ancestry, and things heat up between Juliette and Renard."

Nick McHatton from TV Fanatic, gave a 4.0 star rating out of 5, stating: "I've had my suspicions about Ryan ever since he mentioned taking an interest in Nick's cases, but I wasn't expecting this. 'The Hour of Death' once again played with Grimm's always-present theme of not judging a book by its cover, bringing about some very interesting developments along the way."

Shilo Adams from TV Overmind, wrote: "I liked all the writing tweaks found here, but I kind of wish that we had spent more time with Ryan and had him become more of a person before pulling a reveal like this."

Josie Campbell from TV.com wrote, "It was also a relief to find out Intern Ryan's deal, though it would have been nice to spend more time getting to know him as a person, not just a recurring gag, before his big reveal. Imagine if Ryan had been introduced at the beginning of the season, grown into our favorite new Portland PD addition, and then we found out his secret! Still, 'The Hour of Death' created quite the complicated character, one we can't help but pity. Let's cross our fingers for more suicidal Intern Ryan next week (or at least for learning what the heck he is)."
