= Natural Born Wesen =

- Grimm episode
- Episode no.: Season 2 Episode 14
- Directed by: Michael Watkins
- Written by: Thomas Ian Griffith; Mary Page Keller
- Cinematography by: Eliot Rockett
- Editing by: George Pilkinton
- Production code: 214
- Original air date: March 15, 2013
- Running time: 42 minutes

Guest appearances
- Callard Harris as Cole Pritchard; Lili Mirojnick as Krystal Fletcher; Robert Blanche as Sgt. Franco

Episode chronology
← Previous "Face Off"	Next → "Mr. Sandman"
- Grimm season 2

"Natural Born Wesen" is the 14th episode and of the supernatural drama television series Grimm of season 2 and the 36th overall, which premiered on March 15, 2013, on NBC. The episode was written by Thomas Ian Griffith and Mary Page Keller, and was directed by Michael Watkins.

== Plot ==
Opening quote: "So the animals debated how they might drive the robbers out, and at last settled on an idea."

Nick (David Giuntoli) has drunk the antidote and is experiencing its side effects. Monroe (Silas Weir Mitchell) takes a drop of Nick's blood and adds it to a potion that is ingested by Juliette (Bitsie Tulloch) and Renard (Sasha Roiz). When Juliette returns home, she hallucinates an enormous pit in her living room, and an endless staircase.

The next day, Monroe is in a bank when it is robbed by three Wesen. He tells Nick and Hank (Russell Hornsby) that the robbers broke the most important Wesen law of honor: the Gesetzbuch Ehrenkodex, which forbids any Wesen from exposing their form to the public to "take advantage of normal folk". As a Grimm, Nick must deal with this.

Monroe goes to a Wesen bar to find out about the robbers. He is attacked by the robbers, but is saved by Nick and Hank. In a factory, a homeless man tells Nick and Hank that one of the robbers is a man named Gus (Eric Martin Reid).

The next day, the robbers pull another bank heist, this time killing a woman and a police officer during their escape. The robberies disturb the Wesen community, and a group shows up in the spice shop. Rosalee invokes an uneasy family alliance to contact De Groot (Nurmi Husa), a member of the Wesen Council, to report the Gesetzbuch Ehrenkodex violation. Gus tells his fellow robbers Cole (Callard Harris) and Krysta (Lili Mirojnick) that he is leaving, and they kill him. They flee to the factory, while Nick and Hank arrive to find Gus' body. Nick and Hank arrive at the factory and arrest Cole and Krysta, but the pair are certain that they will quickly be released for lack of evidence.

While Renard is giving a press conference at the station, Nick and Hank arrive with Cole and Krysta. Suddenly, an assassin appears and shoots Cole and Krysta dead. It is revealed that De Groot ordered the assassination in response to the violation of Wesen law. The episode ends with Juliette, still hallucinating, in her bed receiving a call. As lightning invades the room, a deep voice says, "I just want you to know the truth."

== Production notes ==
- The writers of the episode, Thomas Ian Griffith and Mary Page Keller are husband and wife.
- Mary Page Keller portrayed Dr. Higgins in the eighth episode of Grimm season 2, "The Other Side"

== Reception ==
=== Viewers ===
The episode was viewed by 4.91 million people, earning a 1.4/5 in the 18-49 rating demographics on the Nielson ratings scale, ranking second on its timeslot and fifth for the night in the 18-49 demographics, behind 20/20, Blue Bloods, Last Man Standing, and a rerunShark Tank. This was a slight increase in viewership from the previous episode, which was watched by 4.90 million viewers with a 1.5/5. This means that 1.4 percent of all households with televisions watched the episode, while 5 percent of all households watching television at that time watched it. With DVR factoring in, the episode was watched by 7.44 million viewers with a 2.5 ratings share in the 18-49 demographics.

=== Critical reviews ===
"Natural Born Wesen" received positive reviews. The A.V. Club's Kevin McFarland gave the episode a "B" grade and wrote, "The best thing about 'Natural Born Wesen' is that it echoes last season's 'Cat And Mouse' which similarly expanded the Wesen world in compelling fashion. But this episode isn't as good as that one, since it skimps on the explanations and necessary confrontations that arise from the information that Monroe and Rosalee reveal."

Nick McHatton from TV Fanatic, gave a 4.0 star rating out of 5, stating: "One of Grimm's greatest storytelling abilities is having the advantage of literally showing what is directly underneath the surface of its characters, using it to quickly give the audience a characterization; this technique has been used with Rosalee, but she's continually breaking out of her meek shell now. This might be due to Nick, like Monroe, but some of it is due to her taking up her family's business and finding her place in the Wesen world."

Shilo Adams from TV Overmind, wrote: "At the spice shop, Juliette and Renard aren't sure what's going on regarding Nick, the cat that started this whole mess, and their attraction to one another. Monroe attempts to explain the 'emotional nuclear meltdown' that they just went through, but it doesn't seem to get through the either of them, partially because they were more focused on Nick waking up from the drink that he consumed at the end of last week's episode."

Josie Campbell from TV.com wrote, "While the first two episodes after Grimm's long break were both enjoyable, the show needs to finally address the nuts and bolts of the world it's presented to us. We need to see what the Wesen get out of living with humans, or explain why living on their own in hidden all-Wesen communities doesn't work. We need to meet more Wesen who don't flaunt the law [sic], and we need to see that humans in Portland break the law, too—otherwise we're dealing with a world where only Wesen are criminals, and if that's the case we're back to the question of why they're even attempting to fit in."
