= Quill (Grimm) =

- Grimm episode
- Episode no.: Season 2 Episode 4
- Directed by: David Straiton
- Written by: David Simkins
- Cinematography by: Eliot Rockett
- Editing by: Chris G. Willingham
- Production code: 204
- Original air date: September 3, 2012
- Running time: 42 minutes

Guest appearances
- Sharon Sachs as Dr. Harper; Kevin Shinick as Ryan Gilko; Danny Bruno as Bud Wurstner; Robert Blanche as Sgt. Franco

Episode chronology
← Previous "Bad Moon Rising"	Next → "The Good Shepherd"
- Grimm season 2

"Quill" is the 4th episode of the supernatural drama television series Grimm of season 2 and the 26th overall, which premiered on September 3, 2012, on NBC. The episode was written by David Simkins, and was directed by David Straiton.

== Plot ==
Opening quote: "Death stood behind him, and said: 'Follow me, the hour of your departure from this world has come.'"

After a car accident, park ranger Ryan Gilko (Kevin Shinick), is attacked by the other driver, who has an infectious disease. Both are Wesen. Gilko escapes apparently unscathed. Nick (David Giuntoli) and Hank (Russell Hornsby) are sent to retrieve the infected man, but are forced to kill him when he attacks. Renard (Sasha Roiz) is informed by an ally that the royal family has sent a Nuckelavee to get Nick's key.

Juliette (Bitsie Tulloch) regains some memories of people talking about Nick, but still nothing of Nick himself. Gilko shows signs of the disease. Adalind's cat breaks out of its cage and escapes the shop, but Rosalee (Bree Turner) and Monroe (Silas Weir Mitchell) decide not to chase after it. Monroe invites Rosalee to a picnic, and she happily accepts. They encounter Gilko, who chases after them. They escape and return to the shop, where they kiss. Wu (Reggie Lee) calls on the wife of the second driver. She is infected and attacks him, so Wu is forced to kill her.

Nick learns the disease is Fluvis pestilentia, or "yellow plague". He asks Rosalee to prepare an antidote. Noticing Rosalee is infected, Monroe decides to make the antidote himself. Gilko collapses in front of Nick and Hank, and they bring him unconscious to the shop. Rosalee attacks Nick, who renders her unconscious. They give her and Gilko the cure and both recover. The episode ends as the Nuckelavee watches them through a ceiling window.

== Reception ==
=== Viewers ===
The episode was viewed by 4.62 million people, earning a 1.5/4 in the 18-49 rating demographics on the Nielson ratings scale, ranking first on its timeslot and fifth for the night in the 18-49 demographics behind a rerun of 2 Broke Girls, two episodes of Hotel Hell, and a rerun of The Big Bang Theory. This was a 2% decrease in viewership from the previous episode, which was watched by 4.67 million viewers with a 1.6/4. This means that 1.5 percent of all households with televisions watched the episode, while 4 percent of all households watching television at that time watched it.

=== Critical reviews ===
"Quill" received positive reviews. The A.V. Club's Kevin McFarland gave the episode a "B" grade and wrote, "If last week's episode — with a case centered around child kidnapping, inbreeding and ritualistic rape — was what Grimm: SVU would look like, now we know what this show would look like when filtered through a minor zombie plague outbreak. 'Quill' isn't Grimm's version of 28 Days Later or Dawn of the Dead or anything apocalyptic, it’s a standard plague, spreading through a small population, eventually infecting one of the major characters, before a quick remedy comes through right before the episode ends. Nothing particularly special on the plot front, but that's not as important as the character progress, which is moving along nicely to build a stronger character base so that riskier episodic plots will have a better chance for success."

Nick McHatton from TV Fanatic, gave a 4.5 star rating out of 5, stating: "If there's one thing Grimm does well, it's making unlikable characters actually likable (remember my disdain for Juliette?), and 'Quill' accomplishes just that with Hank. Congratulations on joining the pack. Hank! You're officially off the 'I don't care about you' list!"

Shilo Adams from TV Overmind, wrote: "Grimm has done a fine job of filling out the Wesen world. Be it through the introduction of different types of creatures, a look at the ways they go about their intra-species hierarchy. Don’t get me wrong, the show is quite fantastical and appropriately supernatural; it's just that, nearly 30 episodes into its run, Grimm has managed to underline its theme (human duality) fairly well while making the Wesen world feel like, well, a world."

Josie Campbell from TV.com wrote, "Thematically Grimm continues to upend the pieces on the board. Just like Hank and Juliette, we're all frantically evaluating and re-evaluating with every new piece of information we have. We also have to ask ourselves what good and bad means to the various agendas and plots flying around. In Season 1 it would have been a good thing for Juliette to find out about Nick being a Grimm. Now that she has no memory of him, this feels like it'll lead to disaster."
