= The Other Side (Grimm) =

- Grimm episode
- Episode no.: Season 2 Episode 8
- Directed by: Eric Laneuville
- Written by: William Bigelow
- Cinematography by: Eliot Rockett
- Editing by: George Pilkinton
- Production code: 208
- Original air date: October 19, 2012
- Running time: 43 minutes

Guest appearances
- Claire Coffee as Adalind Schade; James Frain as Eric Renard; Mary Page Keller as Dr. Higgins; Logan Miller as Pierce Higgins; Michael Grant Terry as Ryan Smulson; Titus Makin Jr. as Brandon Kingston; Robert Blanche as Sgt. Franco

Episode chronology
← Previous "The Bottle Imp"	Next → "La Llorona"
- Grimm season 2

"The Other Side" is the 8th episode of the supernatural drama television series Grimm of season 2 and the 30th overall, which premiered on October 19, 2012, on NBC. The episode was written by William Bigelow, and was directed by Eric Laneuville.

== Plot ==
Opening quote: "I thought of making myself a beautiful wooden marionette. It must be wonderful, one that can dance, fence and turn somersaults."

Friends participate in a practice run for an academic bowl, then meet for a meal and leave for their houses. One of them is killed by a Löwen. Nick (David Giuntoli) and Juliette (Bitsie Tulloch) attend, as a couple, a function at which Renard accepts an award. When Nick and Hank (Russell Hornsby) are called to investigate the murder, Renard (Sasha Roiz) takes Juliette home. She enters her house and starts taking a shower. Renard sneaks into the house and watches her showering, then exerts his self-control and leaves.

Renard visits the spice shop and asks Monroe (Silas Weir Mitchell) about an antidote for unwanted obsessive desires, but is guarded about details and reveals neither who he is nor who is the object of his desires.

Coach Anker (Hans Altwies) becomes an early suspect because of his competitiveness and his aggressive attitude toward Nick and Hank (and because Nick sees him woge into a Löwen). Wu (Reggie Lee) presents a new intern, Ryan (Michael Grant Terry), to the office. Another contestant is killed, and police find the watch of a different contestant, Pierce Higgins (Logan Miller), in her possession. The death prompts Anker to cancel the bowl. Later, Anker himself is found dead.

In Vienna, Adalind (Claire Coffee) meets with (Sean) Renard's brother, Eric (James Frain). He reveals that while they share the same father, Sean's mother was a Hexenbiest. It was the family's (and specifically Eric's mother's) prejudice against Hexenbiests - which he claims not to share - that forced mother and son to move to Portland.

Pierce becomes convinced that his mother (Mary Page Keller) is the killer; he calls Nick and Hank and then confronts her. However, he then discovers he himself is the killer. His mother altered his DNA before he was born to include both Löwen and Genio Innocuo traits: it is his Löwen part that has been committing the murders. He runs and prepares to commit suicide, but is stopped by Nick. In prison, he uses his Löwen side to attack inmates who are about to assault him.

The episode ends as Renard returns to the spice shop. Monroe tells him that while there is a treatment for the physical side of the problem, it would only slow things down: without addressing the emotional side, his impulses will inevitably become uncontrollable and dangerous. To progress further, they need to know who the object of his desires is, and include them in the treatment.

== Reception ==
=== Viewers ===
The episode was viewed by 5.03 million people, earning a 1.5/5 in the 18-49 rating demographics on the Nielson ratings scale. This was a slight increase in viewership from the previous episode, which was watched by 5.01 million viewers with a 1.6/5. This means that 1.5 percent of all households with televisions watched the episode, while 5 percent of all households watching television at that time watched it. With DVR factoring in, the episode was watched by 7.79 million viewers with a 2.8 ratings share in the 18-49 demographics.

=== Critical reviews ===
"The Other Side" received mixed reviews. The A.V. Club's Kevin McFarland gave the episode a "C+" grade and wrote, "Early in its run, Grimm used its epigraphs as a way to introduce whatever fairy tale was the topic of the episode's major plot. As the show progressed, the epigraphs became indicative of some thematic resonance between a tale and an episode. Now, the writer's seem to be combing any and all fairy tale-adjacent material for quotes to fit a plot that never sprang from the Grimm tales themselves. I understand why the source material can be limiting, but the writers have shown a range of literary influences. Episodes that contrast strong in-show mythology with a scramble to tie in fairy tale elements shows how over-complication of this world may not be playing to Grimm's advantage."

Emily Rome of EW wrote, "This episode, called 'The Other Side,' was not without some forward momentum for the continuing stories of Juliette and Renard's potion-induced obsession with each other and of Adalind's return. Once the show established the group of ill-fated academic decathlon kids, it moved on to Nick and Juliette getting ready for a dinner in Renard's honor – he received an award for his work with the Portland Police. A thank you from Nick to Juliette for accompanying him to a dinner he hopes isn't too dull is met with Juliette's response of, 'Of course. This is what couples do – they go to each other's boring work functions.'"

Nick McHatton from TV Fanatic gave a 4.0 star rating out of 5, stating: "'The Other Side' sets its procedural story up as one large metaphor for the upcoming drama that is about to unfold. I just wish the killer kid story hadn't been used back-to-back. Thankfully, Pierce being the culprit isn't the main takeaway from the story – it's his genetics. Pierce is half Lowen, half Genio Innocuo, and, because of that, if he can't keep his emotions in check his violent side comes out. It's a light twist to what Renard is going through."

Shilo Adams from TV Overmind, wrote: "In the world of Grimm, knowledge is the type of leverage needed to survive. Nick had to learn quickly about the Wesen world in order to become a better Grimm, Hank's reaction to the news that Nick can see creatures as well was one of comfort, and Juliette has been trying to get her memory back in order to fully love her partner once again. With Monroe having to pick up information at the spice shop in Rosalee's absence, Renard continuing to obsess over Juliette with no end in sight, and Adalind attempting to get in good with the royal family to get vengeance for her mother, knowledge played a big part in 'The Other Side'."

Josie Campbell from TV.com wrote, "Up until the ending, 'The Other Side' was a great Wesen-of-the-week episode that did a nice job of balancing Adalind's plotting and mythology with cop-procedural action. It was fun to see Monroe geek out about the spice shop and Hank get upset about the Grimms' bloody past. Plus Renard is such a strong character that I even liked the Juliette storyline. But Nick and Hank's cynical shrugging-off of a mentally unbalanced kid who desperately needed help not only felt out of character for both of them, it also destroyed the whole premise of Grimm — that Nick, despite being a Grimm, is still a good guy."
