= The Bottle Imp (Grimm) =

- Grimm episode
- Episode no.: Season 2 Episode 7
- Directed by: Darnell Martin
- Written by: Alan Di Fiore
- Cinematography by: Marshall Adams
- Editing by: Chris Willingham
- Production code: 207
- Original air date: October 12, 2012
- Running time: 42 minutes

Guest appearances
- Josh Stewart as William Granger; Claire Coffee as Adalind Schade; Jade Pettyjohn as April Granger

Episode chronology
← Previous "Over My Dead Body"	Next → "The Other Side"
- Grimm season 2

"The Bottle Imp" is the 7th episode of the supernatural drama television series Grimm of season 2 and the 29th overall, which premiered on October 12, 2012, on NBC. The episode was written by Alan DiFiore, and was directed by Darnell Martin.

== Plot ==
Opening quote: "‘Let me out, let me out,’ the spirit cried. And the boy, thinking no evil, drew the cork out of the bottle."

Nick (David Giuntoli) wakes from a happy dream in which Juliette (Bitsie Tulloch) has got her memories back. Monroe (Silas Weir Mitchell), still running the spice shop, receives instructions from Rosalee (Bree Turner) to prepare a special order. He does so, but uses an incorrect ingredient. Later, he realizes his mistake and needs her help with an antidote.

William (Josh Stewart) picks up his daughter, April (Jade Pettyjohn), and they go to a gas station. William's cards are rejected, frustrating him. The station attendant is killed violently. Wu (Reggie Lee) views video footage showing William smashing cameras, but manages to find his truck's plates. Meanwhile, William and April have hitchhiked a ride.

Nick and Hank (Russell Hornsby) raid William's house to find his wife, Lilly (October Moore), badly beaten. They surmise that William beat her and took April. Juliette visits the police station and greets everyone, hoping it will help restore her memories. When Captain Renard (Sasha Roiz) greets her, she feels a moment of tension. Renard gets a call from Adalind (Claire Coffee), who demands the name of her mother's murderer. He deflects and instead demands to know what she did to Juliette. She taunts him, saying he is going to "have some fun". After hanging up, Renard realizes he has typed Juliette's name repeatedly on the computer.

Wu discovers that William has been ordering items for an underground construction. Nick introduces Hank to the trailer. He tells him that it was Monroe who saved him from Stark and Hank acknowledges that he owes Monroe his life. They find April and take her into custody while William visits his wife in the hospital. Nick and Hank arrive there to arrest him, but learn it was April who attacked Lilly and killed the gas station attendant. She is going through an "early change" in discovering her Wesen (Drang-zorn) identity.

April is provisionally placed with a foster family but attacks the father when he tries to discipline her. A Drang-zorn friend of Monroe's who is a guard at the local juvie comes to see Nick and promises to take April under her wing.

The episode ends as Nick goes home and joins Juliette for dinner. They dance and briefly kiss, but Juliette sees Renard's face in place of Nick's. She backs away, confused - and confusing Nick.

== Reception ==
=== Viewers ===
The episode was viewed by 5.01 million people, earning a 1.6/5 in the 18-49 rating demographics on the Nielson ratings scale. This was a 6% decrease in viewership from the previous episode, which was watched by 5.29 million viewers with a 1.6/5. This means that 1.6 percent of all households with televisions watched the episode, while 5 percent of all households watching television at that time watched it. With DVR factoring in, the episode was watched by 7.69 million viewers with a 2.8 ratings share in the 18-49 demographics.

=== Critical reviews ===
"The Bottle Imp" received positive reviews. The A.V. Club's Kevin McFarland gave the episode a "B−" grade and wrote, "Judging by overall plot structure, 'The Bottle Imp' isn't just a formulaic episode of Grimm, but a relentlessly predictable hour that offers very little to viewers looking for something more than a show that can easily fade into the background while the rest of the country watches baseball."

Emily Rome of EW wrote, "Oh, Grimm, how cruel you are! Or maybe I should be saying the sandman is a very, very cruel creature. In any case, Nick's dream of Juliette remembering him and giving him a big smooch is just about the last kind of dream Nick would want to be tricked into believing is real."

Nick McHatton from TV Fanatic, gave a 4.5 star rating out of 5, stating: "One of Grimm's best assets is the ability to show someone’s true colors. What is just below the exterior of a character? 'The Bottle Imp' did just that, and in a way that made both the procedural story and the continuing character arcs richer."

Shilo Adams from TV Overmind, wrote: "In the world of Grimm, you never know what people are capable of. The show has continually hit on the idea that what we present to the public are merely facades, what we want them to see rather than who we actually are. We're all hiding something that we'd rather not share with anyone that we know, let alone the strangers that we encounter on a daily basis. Unfortunately for some, they have to hide an entire identity for fear of the reaction that other people would have to who they truly are."

Josie Campbell from TV.com wrote, "I think much of this is due to the semi-serialized, semi-episodic nature of the show. More than just a mythology-episodes-versus-monster-of-the-week series, Grimm straddles the line between television where what happened the week before doesn't matter, and an epic, over-arching story where everything matters. The show has been able to be both this season by throwing dashes of greater mythology into every episode, so here's hoping 'The Bottle Imp' is a bump in an otherwise smoother Season 2 road."
