= One Angry Fuchsbau =

- Grimm episode
- Episode no.: Season 2 Episode 17
- Directed by: Terrence O'Hara
- Written by: Richard Hatem
- Cinematography by: Marshall Adams
- Editing by: George Pilkinton
- Production code: 217
- Original air date: April 5, 2013
- Running time: 42 minutes

Guest appearances
- James Frain as Eric Renard; Lisa Vidal as Lauren Castro; Brian T. Finney as Barry Kellogg; Bertila Damas as Pilar; Danny Bruno as Bud Wurstner

Episode chronology
← Previous "Nameless"	Next → "Volcanalis"
- Grimm season 2

"One Angry Fuchsbau" is the 17th episode and of the supernatural drama television series Grimm of season 2 and the 39th overall, which premiered on April 5, 2013, on NBC. The episode was written by Richard Hatem, and was directed by Terrence O'Hara.

== Plot ==
Opening quote: "He sang a sweet song in tones so full and soft that no human ear could resist them nor fathom their origin..." (Source: The quotation is inspired by, but not actually from "The Garden of Paradise".)

In a flashback to 6 months previously, a Löwen named Don Nidaria (Phillip Keiman) kills his Maushertz wife, Katherine (Erica Sullivan), in an act of rage. In the present, Don's lawyer, Barry Kellogg (Brian T. Finney), uses his powers to spread a pheromone among the jury—of which Rosalee (Bree Turner) is foreman—causing them to agree with his statements.

Nick (David Giuntoli) encourages Monroe (Silas Weir Mitchell) to show Juliette (Bitsie Tulloch) the trailer. Juliette becomes confused by the strange books and the weapons. Suddenly, she begins seeing flashbacks of Nick to when he was trying to explain the Grimm world to her. Monroe finds Rosalee sick after attending court and offers to accompany her the next day. He watches as a witness changes her testimony, then follows as Kellogg goes to the bathroom to eat a toad. He realizes that Kellogg is a Ziegevolk.

Nick, Hank (Russell Hornsby), and Monroe attend the next hearing. They watch as Wu (Reggie Lee) changes his testimony at Kellogg's prompting. In the spice shop, Rosalee looks up an antidote, but it requires Kellogg's sweat. Along with Bud (Danny Bruno), Nick, Hank and Monroe set up a sting operation: Monroe chases Kellogg, who is "saved" by Bud, who gives Kellogg a handkerchief to wipe off his sweat and ascertains where he is staying. The next morning, Nick and Hank arrive and question Kellogg while Monroe sneaks in to inject the antidote into the toad. He is surprised to find two toads, and is forced to choose just one of them to inject.

Meanwhile, in Vienna, Adalind (Claire Coffee) tells Eric (James Frain) that Renard (Sasha Roiz) has failed to get the key. Eric decides to visit his brother. In the court, the jury finds Don guilty, shocking Kellogg. That night, while the group are celebrating their victory, Kellogg visits the spice shop looking for an antidote for his condition. Upon recognizing everyone in the shop, he realizes he has been duped: he woges into his Ziegevolk form and attacks Rosalee. Monroe rushes to protect her and starts to beat Kellogg, but is stopped by Nick, who arrests the lawyer. In the final scene, Juliette is at home, surrounded by visions of Nick at various times in their relationship, as her memory comes rushing back.

== Reception ==
=== Viewers ===
The episode was viewed by 5.13 million people, earning a 1.5/5 in the 18-49 rating demographics on the Nielson ratings scale, ranking second on its timeslot and fifth for the night in the 18-49 demographics, behind Blue Bloods, Undercover Boss, 20/20, and Shark Tank. This was a 5% increase in viewership from the previous episode, which was watched by 4.86 million viewers with a 1.4/4. This means that 1.5 percent of all households with televisions watched the episode, while 5 percent of all households watching television at that time watched it. With DVR factoring in, the episode was watched by 7.91 million viewers with a 2.7 ratings share in the 18-49 demographics.

=== Critical reviews ===
"One Angry Fuchsbau" received positive reviews. The A.V. Club's Les Chappell gave the episode a "B+" grade and wrote, "'One Angry Fuchsbau' doesn't quite recapture the same energy that 'Season of the Hexenbiest' promised, but it's a definite step up over the last few weeks for many reasons. There are a lot of things happening in this episode — almost too many to make it feel structurally sound — and the majority of what's happening are events that need to happen if we want to move onto something stronger. And more importantly, after three bleak and violent episodes that fixated on serial killer Wesen, this is probably the most fun an episode of Grimm's ever been, one that takes the show's stronger elements and sets them loose in a good old fashioned caper."

Nick McHatton from TV Fanatic, gave a 3.9 star rating out of 5, stating: "'One Angry Fuchsbau' was a rather modest episode for Grimm Season 2. The callbacks, small moments and humor made for a fun, but mostly lighthearted installment. But that's about it."

Shilo Adams from TV Overmind, wrote: "Although I've not been a fan of the Juliette storyline this season, I liked how the case this week tied into the concept of memory and how easily it can be manipulated."
