= Mr. Sandman (Grimm) =

- Grimm episode
- Episode no.: Season 2 Episode 15
- Directed by: Norberto Barba
- Written by: Alan DiFiore
- Cinematography by: Marshall Adams
- Editing by: Casey Rohrs
- Production code: 215
- Original air date: March 22, 2013
- Running time: 42 minutes

Guest appearances
- Kieren Hutchison as Andre; Sharon Sachs as Dr. Harper; Jenny Wade as Casey; Megan Henning as Molly Fisk

Episode chronology
← Previous "Natural Born Wesen"	Next → "Nameless"
- Grimm season 2

"Mr. Sandman" is the 15th episode of season 2 and the 37th overall of the supernatural drama Grimm television series which premiered on March 22, 2013, on NBC. The episode was written by Alan DiFiore, and was directed by Norberto Barba.

== Plot ==
Opening quote: "Now we've got eyes — eyes — a beautiful pair of children's eyes," he whispered.

A man named Andre (Kieren Hutchison) attends a grief support group meeting where he talks to Molly (Megan Henning) and later drives her to her home. There, he woges into a fly-like Wesen (a Jinnamuru Xunte) and releases a red powder in her face, blinding her. He consumes her tears and leaves. Blind and panicking, she brings a bookshelf down on herself and dies. Nick (David Giuntoli) and Hank (Russell Hornsby) investigate and make the connection to Andre, who is possibly of South African origin. In Vienna, Adalind (Claire Coffee) meets with a Hexenbiest, Frau Pech (Mary McDonald-Lewis), who readily agrees to help her with the baby. At night, Renard (Sasha Roiz) wakes up to see Juliette (Bitsie Tulloch) in his bed, who then woges into a creature—seemingly a dream or a message from Frau Pech.

Andre finds another victim, Kelly (Suzanne Tufan) but she escapes when her sister, Casey (Jenny Wade) arrives. In the trailer, Nick, Hank and Monroe (Silas Weir Mitchell) read about the Jinnamuru Xunte. Kelly wakes up in the hospital with parasitic worms now spreading into her eyes. Andre is seen at a high school and the police are sent to apprehend him. Nick catches Andre, but he sprays the red powder on Nick, blinding him as well, and flees.

Hank takes Nick to the spice shop. Rosalee (Bree Turner) and Monroe research and find a cure, but it requires them to extract the Jinnamuru Xunte's eye while alive and woged. Meanwhile, Nick's sense of hearing has heightened to the extent that he can clearly understand people talking quietly in the next room. Casey returns home and is attacked by Andre. Hank is called and goes, reluctantly taking Nick, Monroe and Rosalee. They catch Andre, knocking him unconscious, and cut out his eye to make the antidote. Andre wakes up in his normal form and tries to escape, but is stabbed to death by Casey.

Rosalee mixes the ingredients and restores Nick's sight. Juliette sees a ghost in her house and challenges it to reveal itself. It takes a form resembling Nick before disappearing. In the final scene, Nick is practicing batting fruit, thrown by Monroe, while blindfolded. He hits every one.

== Reception ==
=== Viewers ===
The episode was viewed by 5.00 million people, earning a 1.4/4 in the 18–49 rating demographics on the Nielson ratings scale, ranking second on its timeslot and fifth for the night in the 18–49 demographics, behind a rerun of Shark Tank, Malibu Country, 20/20, and Last Man Standing. This was a slight increase in viewership from the previous episode, which was watched by 4.91 million viewers with a 1.4/5. This means that 1.4 percent of all households with televisions watched the episode, while 4 percent of all households watching television at that time watched it. With DVR factoring in, the episode was watched by 7.39 million viewers with a 2.4 ratings share in the 18–49 demographics.

=== Critical reviews ===
"Mr. Sandman" received positive reviews. The A.V. Club's Kevin McFarland gave the episode a "B−" grade and wrote, "Unfortunately, Grimm's tendency to cherry-pick folktale elements doesn't work as well with Hofmman's story. Strip-mining for a few scary features, instead of using the story as a strong foundation, or as the launching point for a departure in narrative style, yields a basic case of the week plot with some scary elements, but with a disappointing lack of ambition. That's par for the course with Grimm, but when using such ripe source material, it makes the unremarkable goals of the show much more underwhelming."

Nick McHatton from TV Fanatic, gave a 4.0 star rating out of 5, stating: "'Mr. Sandman' didn't bring any dreams or cute things to Portland. This is Grimm, after all. Why bring dreams when you can bring death and blindness? The case of the week proved to be one of the greater investigations of Grimm Season 2. The idea of a man stealing the sight of people who are in periods of grief and, literally, having them lose their way all so he can find his own is pretty compelling."

Shilo Adams from TV Overmind, wrote: "Grossest episode of Grimm yet? I don’t mind a little gore, but the eye scooping and what happened to Kelly in the hospital were both disturbing."

Josie Campbell from TV.com wrote, "The short scenes with Adalind and Renard weren't enough to satisfy, especially since I care way more about the Royal machinations and inner workings of the Wesen world than I do about a lone monster criminal. The complex mythology is the best thing about this show, yet the writers seem to think we tune in for the boring, formulaic crime aspect. With most of Season 2 now behind us, Grimm is still trying to decide what type of series it's going to be."
