= Nameless (Grimm) =

- Grimm episode
- Episode no.: Season 2 Episode 16
- Directed by: Charles Haid
- Written by: Akela Cooper
- Cinematography by: Eliot Rockett
- Editing by: Chris Willingham
- Production code: 216
- Original air date: March 29, 2013
- Running time: 42 minutes

Guest appearances
- Eric Lange as Dominick Spinner; Camille Chen as Jenna Marshall

Episode chronology
← Previous "Mr. Sandman"	Next → "One Angry Fuchsbau"
- Grimm season 2

"Nameless" is the 16th episode and of the supernatural drama television series Grimm of season 2 and the 38th overall, which premiered on March 29, 2013, on NBC. The episode was written by Akela Cooper, and was directed by Charles Haid.

== Plot ==
Opening quote: "Then he seized his left foot with both hands in such a fury that he split in two."

During a party celebrating the launch of a new video game, Brody Crawford (Quinn Franzen) is killed by a Wesen using an acid to cut his body in half. Nick (David Giuntoli), Hank (Russell Hornsby) and Wu (Reggie Lee) investigate, finding the words "Play My Game" written in blood on the wall.

Nick and Hank question the game company's head of administration, Dominick Spinner (Eric Lange), and software programmers Jenna (Camille Chen) and Vicky (Beth Thompson), about Brody. Suddenly, Jenna's phone rings and the voice in the other end utters the same words written on the wall. The call is from Brody's office: they go to the office but no one is there. Instead they find Brody's ID cut in half, and the torn-out title pages of three books (all written by authors using a pseudonym), defaced with the words "What's", "My", and "Name".

Meanwhile, Juliette's (Bitsie Tulloch) visions of Nick's ghost continue and she approaches Monroe (Silas Weir Mitchell) and Rosalee (Bree Turner) for help. Nick and Hank receive a tip from Spinner about Ridley Cooper, Jenna's boyfriend before she began dating Brody. Ridley tells them he was playing the game at the time of Brody's death. He says that Brody's avatar was killed the night before his real death, by a user named "Nameless", who cut the avatar in half.

Renard (Sasha Roiz) receives a call from his informant, who arrives in Portland to discuss the family. Vicky is called by the killer: Nick and Hank arrive to find her body cut in half, an unsolved Sudoku puzzle and the same message on the wall: "Guess My name". Wu solves the puzzle, revealing a date and a time. Jenna deduces that the one responsible is an "IT guy" who repaired her computer and also fixed a problem with the code for the new game.

While dining with his informant, Renard realizes there's an assassin in the restaurant. He finds a bomb and throws it into the street, where it detonates, killing the assassin. Nick and Hank find out they're dealing with a Fuchsteufelswild. With Spinner's help, they identify the killer as Trinket Lipslums (Chris Murray). Jenna draws him out by killing his avatar in the game. Pursued by the police, Trinket climbs to the rooftop of a building, from where, refusing to acknowledge he has lost, he jumps to his death.

Juliette demands from Monroe that she be taken to see Aunt Marie's trailer, so that she can recover more of her memory. Monroe relays her ultimatum to Nick: if she isn't allowed to see the trailer, she will leave him, and Portland, for good.

== Reception ==
=== Viewers ===
The episode was viewed by 4.86 million people, earning a 1.4/4 in the 18-49 rating demographics on the Nielson ratings scale, ranking second on its timeslot and sixth for the night in the 18-49 demographics, behind a rerun of 20/20, a game of NCAA basketball tournament between the Oregon Ducks and the Louisville Cardinals, Shark Tank, and another NCAA game between the Duke Blue Devils and the Michigan Wolverines. This was a 3% decrease in viewership from the previous episode, which was watched by 5.00 million viewers with a 1.4/4. This means that 1.4 percent of all households with televisions watched the episode, while 4 percent of all households watching television at that time watched it. With DVR factoring in, the episode was watched by 7.53 million viewers with a 2.5 ratings share in the 18-49 demographics.

=== Critical reviews ===
"Nameless" received mixed reviews. The A.V. Club's Kevin McFarland gave the episode a "C−" grade and wrote, "Let's not pussyfoot around this one: 'Nameless' is the worst episode of Grimm's second season by a wide margin, on par with the disastrous Cinderella-inspired 'Happily Ever Aftermath' from almost a year ago. It's a cheesy reworking of a character Once Upon A Time has used to significantly more successful effect, and it's not often that I find myself resigned to admitting that."

Nick McHatton from TV Fanatic, gave a 3.8 star rating out of 5, stating: "'Nameless' is filled with plenty of interesting side stories and plot development, but Grimm's procedural story is better left forgotten."

Shilo Adams from TV Overmind, wrote: "For a minute, I assumed that Spinner would be revealed to have played some role in the killings, but then I realized that Continuum did something like that this season. So many supernatural/sci-fi shows with procedural elements, you guys."
