= To Protect and Serve Man =

- Grimm episode
- Episode no.: Season 2 Episode 11
- Directed by: Omar Madha
- Written by: Dan E. Fesman
- Cinematography by: Marshall Adams
- Editing by: George Pilkinton
- Production code: 211
- Original air date: November 9, 2012
- Running time: 42 minutes

Guest appearances
- Jason Gedrick as Craig Ferren; Lisa Vidal as Lauren Castro; Jamie McShane as John Kreski

Episode chronology
← Previous "The Hour of Death"	Next → "Season of the Hexenbiest"
- Grimm season 2

"To Protect and Serve Man" is the 11th episode of the supernatural drama television series Grimm of season 2 and the 33rd overall, which premiered on November 9, 2012, on the cable network NBC. The episode was written by Dan E. Fesman, and was directed by Omar Madha.

== Plot ==
Opening quote: "The beast was simply the Call of the Wild personified... which some natures hear to their own destruction."

In a flashback to 7 years earlier, Hank (Russell Hornsby) and his partner are called to a fight in a house. At the scene, they find one man dead and another wounded. A third man, Craig Ferren (Jason Gedrick), flees but Hank catches and arrests him while he yells about "monsters" wanting to eat him.

In the present, it is one day before Ferren's execution. Knowing what he now does about Wesen, Hank thinks that Ferren may have been telling the truth, and asks Nick (David Giuntoli) for help to prove his innocence. They find a drawing of what Ferren saw, which Nick identifies as a Wendigo—a cannibalistic type of Wesen that kills humans and buries the bodies in a pit. They go to the location of the house intending to search for bodies, but discover that a grocery store has been built on the site.

Nick and Hank visit the address of the wounded man, John Kreski (Jamie McShane). They find bodies under the house, but Kreski arrives and attacks them: he traps Nick in the body pit and escapes. Nick calls DA Lauren Castro (Lisa Vidal) to convince her to stay the execution. Kreski confronts Nick and is killed by Hank. The authorities inspect the grocery store and find more bodies. Castro announces that Ferren is to be released pending further investigation.

Renard (Sasha Roiz) arrives at the spice shop hoping to collect the potion to reverse his obsession, bringing Juliette (Bitsie Tulloch) with him. Monroe (Silas Weir Mitchell) walks in on them kissing and is shocked to recognize Juliette.

== Reception ==
=== Viewers ===
The episode was viewed by 5.21 million people, earning a 1.7/5 in the 18-49 rating demographics on the Nielson ratings scale, ranking second on its timeslot and fourth for the night in the 18-49 demographics, behind Malibu Country, Undercover Boss, and Shark Tank. This was an 8% decrease in viewership from the previous episode, which was watched by 5.64 million viewers with a 1.8/5. This means that 1.7 percent of all households with televisions watched the episode, while 5 percent of all households watching television at that time watched it. With DVR factoring in, the episode was watched by 8.08 million viewers with a 2.9 ratings share in the 18-49 demographics.

=== Critical reviews ===
"To Protect and Serve Man" received positive reviews. The A.V. Club's Les Chappell gave the episode a "B+" grade and wrote, "'To Protect And Serve Man' doesn't do much to break this trend — with the exception of one promising development I'll get to later — but as a case of the week it's above duller installments like 'The Bottle Imp' and 'The Other Side.' This is largely because it's tied so closely to the smartest move Grimm made all season, the decision to bring Hank into the fold and let him in on Nick's secret life. Hank's new perspective leads him to reconsider a case from seven years earlier, where an Army veteran named Craig Ferrin shot two brothers and claimed they were 'monsters' who wanted to eat him."

Nick McHatton from TV Fanatic, gave a 4.2 star rating out of 5, stating: "As much as I tend to complain when Grimm decides to veer back to its procedural roots, tonight's episode didn't bother me in the slightest. It could be due to some of the serial arcs this season because they are slow burning, but then that would take away from the genuinely compelling case."

Josie Campbell from TV.com wrote, "'To Protect and Serve Man,' the last episode of Grimm before the show's fall finale, continued to lean on the series' cop drama side rather than mythology to deliver a solidly entertaining story about saving an innocent man's life, and a solidly obsession-based story of Renard/Juliette smoochies."
