= The Good Shepherd (Grimm) =

- Grimm episode
- Episode no.: Season 2 Episode 5
- Directed by: Steven DePaul
- Written by: Dan E. Fesman
- Cinematography by: Marshall Adams
- Editing by: George Pilkinton
- Production code: 205
- Original air date: September 28, 2012
- Running time: 42 minutes

Guest appearances
- Jonathan Scarfe as Lance Calvin; Kristina Anapau as Megan Marston; Danny Bruno as Bud Wurstner; Jeanine Jackson as Paula

Episode chronology
← Previous "Quill"	Next → "Over My Dead Body"
- Grimm season 2

"The Good Shepherd" is the 5th episode of the supernatural drama television series Grimm of season 2 and the 27th overall, which premiered on September 28, 2012, on NBC. The episode was written by Dan E. Fesman, and was directed by Steven DePaul. The series returned to its normal Friday timeslot beginning with this episode.

== Plot ==
Opening quote: "Dressed in the skin, the wolf strolled into the pasture with the Sheep. Soon a little Lamb was following him about and was quickly led away to slaughter."

Bud (Danny Bruno) talks to Nick (David Giuntoli) about Juliette's (Bitsie Tulloch) memory loss and decides it would best to avoid her. The Nuckelavee watches them. An accountant working late is assaulted by a Blutbad and dropped into a wood chipper.

Nick and Hank (Russell Hornsby) are visited by Lance Calvin (Jonathan Scarfe), a pastor: his church's bank account has been emptied and the money transferred overseas. The evidence implicates the accountant. Nick and Hank visit the church. Nick sees the parishioners are sheep-like Seelenguter and the Pastor is a wolf-like Blutbad. The accountant's body is found while Nick is interviewing the secretary, Megan (Kristina Anapau). Monroe (Silas Weir Mitchell) infiltrates the church to help the investigation.

Renard (Sasha Roiz) is sent details identifying the Nuckelavee as David Esquibel. Calvin discusses with Megan his plan to kill Monroe and frame him for an attempt on his life. They discuss their plan to escape to the Caribbean. Nick and Hank uncover reports of crimes at churches previously run by Calvin.

Megan discovers that Calvin cheated on her and got a parishioner pregnant, and denounces him as a thief and murderer. The parishioners turn on Calvin and kill him. They then turn on Monroe because he is also a Blutbad; Nick and Hank arrive in time to save him. Esquibel attacks Nick at his aunt's trailer. Nick kills him and discovers that he was looking for the key.

The episode ends as Megan and a friend (the woman whom Calvin got pregnant) relax in the Caribbean, the plan she had originally conceived with Calvin.

== Reception ==
=== Viewers ===
The episode was viewed by 5.32 million people, earning a 1.6/4 in the 18-49 rating demographics on the Nielson ratings scale. This was a 2% decrease in viewership from the previous episode, which was watched by 4.62 million viewers with a 1.5/4. This means that 1.6 percent of all households with televisions watched the episode, while 4 percent of all households watching television at that time watched it. With DVR factoring in, the episode was watched by 8.24 million viewers with a 2.9 ratings share in the 18-49 demographics.

=== Critical reviews ===
"The Good Shepherd" received mixed reviews. The A.V. Club's Kevin McFarland gave the episode a "C" grade and wrote, "Tonight's epigraph comes from 'The Wolf In Sheep's Clothing' (of somewhat disputed Aesop/biblical origin), which tipped the episode's hand right at the start. So far the best episodes of Grimm have found a way to take a well-known folk tale — or the occasional obscure story — and give it a modern twist to fit in a crime procedural context. Not so with 'The Good Shepherd,' which is mostly a literal take on that story, depicting a Blutbad reverend presiding over a congregation of sheep Wesen (at one point Monroe says the name and the plural form, but I honestly have no clue how to spell it). It's all a bit too clever from the get-go, with the whole flock of sheep as the reverend's flock, the herd mentality, et al."

Emily Rome of EW wrote, "Let it be known that Grimm has a thing or two to teach us about herd mentality, how con men talk when pretending to be religious men and just how many bake sales you need to replace stolen funds. I was relieved Rev. Calvin's megachurch vibe turned out to be an act because it just felt so fake. I know there are real fire-and-brimstone guys out there, but no men of the cloth I know talk like that."

Nick McHatton from TV Fanatic, gave a 4.0 star rating out of 5, stating: "After a few weeks off from an early start, Grimm settled back into its Friday night slot with 'The Good Shepherd.' Sadly for Grimm, however, tonight tried telling a mostly procedural story rather than a serial one, and the show stumbled a bit because of it. However, aside from said stumble, there were a few moments that were more than worth the price of admission."

Josie Campbell from TV.com wrote, "Characters and themes aside, the show unfortunately missed a cool opportunity to flesh out the Wesen belief system, or at least examine religion from the monsters' point of view. What does Leviathan think of the Old Testament? Do snake-Wesen get upset at their portrayal in the Garden of Eden? Are animal-headed Pagan gods Wesen too? Instead Grimm trotted out a vague Christian group for the sheeple to belong to and left potentially juicier aspects out."
