= Over My Dead Body (Grimm) =

- Grimm episode
- Episode no.: Season 2 Episode 6
- Directed by: Rob Bailey
- Written by: Spiro Skentzos
- Cinematography by: Eliot Rockett
- Editing by: Casey Rohrs
- Production code: 206
- Original air date: October 5, 2012
- Running time: 42 minutes

Guest appearances
- Jaime Ray Newman as Angelina Lasser; Alice Evans as Mia Gaudot; Matt Gerald as Arbok

Episode chronology
← Previous "The Good Shepherd"	Next → "The Bottle Imp"
- Grimm season 2

"Over My Dead Body" is the 6th episode of the supernatural drama television series Grimm of season 2 and the 28th overall, which premiered on October 5, 2012, on NBC. The episode was written by Spiro Skentzos, and was directed by Rob Bailey.

== Plot ==
Opening quote: "Whilst he thus gazed before him, he saw a snake creep out of a corner of the vault and approach the dead body."

Mia (Alice Evans), just arrived from Tokyo, calls Renard (Sasha Roiz); she wants to meet to "make up" for something that happened in Vienna. Juliette (Bitsie Tulloch) prepares a meal for Nick (David Giuntoli) using a recipe that, before she lost her memory of him, she had annotated "Nick loves". Meanwhile, Monroe (Silas Weir Mitchell) is preparing a dinner for Rosalee (Bree Turner).

In a bar, Angelina (Jaime Ray Newman) meets a man celebrating a new job. She leaves, but he follows her out. He attacks her, woging into a Skalengeck; she woges into a Blutbad and kills him. She is then subdued and kidnapped by Arbok (Matt Gerald), a Königschlange, and his human accomplice. They offer her the dead man's contract: to kill a man. Angelina interrupts Monroe's and Rosalee's dinner to tell Monroe that he is her target.

Monroe calls Nick, urgently requesting he comes over. Angelina explains that she has been hired to kill Monroe for $25,000 - if she fails, she will be killed. Rosalee tells Monroe she is leaving Portland for a few days and asks him to run the shop. He agrees, saying nothing about his problem.

Nick and Angelina, with help from Hank (Russell Hornsby), plan a ruse. Using a recipe from Rosalee (whom Monroe now tells of the contract on him), they prepare a potion to make it look like Monroe is dead. Angelina makes a call, and they deliver Monroe to the enforcers. The person paying for the hit also arrives: Mia. Satisfied that Monroe is dead, Mia instructs Arbok to pay Angelina, then leaves.

Monroe starts to wake up. Angelina revives him as the enforcers look on in alarm; a gunfight ensues. Angelina takes a bullet in the chest. Monroe kills the human enforcer, but Arbok runs, chased by Nick. Angelina dies in Monroe's arms. Arbok attacks Nick; Hank kills him. Renard is waiting for Mia as she arrives at the airport. He demands she tell him everything before he decides whether to kill her.

Nick arrives home and calls Rosalee to let her know Monroe is fine. He finds a note from Juliette: "Thanks for the new memories." The episode ends as Monroe buries Angelina in the woods according to Blutbad tradition and lets out a mournful howl.

== Reception ==
=== Viewers ===
The episode was viewed by 5.29 million people, earning a 1.6/5 in the 18-49 rating demographics on the Nielson ratings scale. This was a 1% decrease in viewership from the previous episode, which was watched by 5.32 million viewers with a 1.6/4. This means that 1.6 percent of all households with televisions watched the episode, while 5 percent of all households watching television at that time watched it. With DVR factoring in, the episode was watched by 7.84 million viewers with a 2.8 ratings share in the 18-49 demographics.

=== Critical reviews ===
"Over My Dead Body" received positive reviews. The A.V. Club's Kevin McFarland gave the episode a "B" grade and wrote, "Grimm has had an up and down second season thus far, pitching wildly from promising to disappointing and offering glimpses of a more cohesive main cast and reliable plot arc. 'Over My Dead Body' falls on the positive side of the list for me, but not completely, since among many elements that worked — Hank slipping into a bit of a less-quippy Xander role as he questions Monroe, sparing use of Juliette and Renard, and a surprisingly resonant death and final scene — there are still some logistical issues that gum up the works and prevent it from progressing to something more than just above-average for Grimm."

Emily Rome of EW wrote, "It's date night in Portland. And even for the Portlanders whose nights were filled with more zitherists and wine than creepy would-be rapists, the course of love never does run smooth. Not smooth at all. In fact, by the end of tonight's hour of Grimm, 'smooth' is just about the last word you could use to describe any of what went down in this episode."

Nick McHatton from TV Fanatic, gave a 4.5 star rating out of 5, stating: "'Over My Dead Body' went back to telling a strictly serial story - and Grimm benefited from it immensely. Coming along for the solely serial ride is Angelina, who you may remember from 'The Three Bad Wolves,' and she's just as charming as ever. Sadly, even for all of Angelina's charm, over the course of the hour it became apparent her story arc would be coming to a close rather than staying open-ended again."

Shilo Adams, from TV Overmind, wrote: "Much of the latter part of the first season (and beginning of the second season) of Grimm has focused on the impact that Nick has had on the Wesen world as a whole. His emergence as a powerful, efficient Grimm with connections has sent shockwaves through the Wesen population, making him a major target of both the Wesen and the royal families. It's one thing to have a Grimm around, but to have one that has gotten this good this quickly with a partner from the Wesen world could have major implications that reverberate for years to come."

Josie Campbell from TV.com wrote, "I've said it once, and I'll say it again: It's hard out there for a Grimm! Especially when the Royals start targeting your friends in an effort to undermine you—this is why superheroes have secret identities, Nick. Passions were flying high this week as date night, or in Renard's case, potentially-lethal-booty-call-night, turned sour in bloody Grimm fashion."
