= Season of the Hexenbiest =

- Grimm episode
- Episode no.: Season 2 Episode 12
- Directed by: Karen Gaviola
- Story by: Jim Kouf
- Teleplay by: David Greenwalt; Jim Kouf
- Cinematography by: Eliot Rockett
- Editing by: Casey Rohrs
- Production code: 212
- Original air date: November 16, 2012
- Running time: 42 minutes

Episode chronology
← Previous "To Protect and Serve Man"	Next → "Face Off"
- Grimm season 2

"Season of the Hexenbiest" is the 12th episode and mid-season finale of the supernatural drama television series Grimm of season 2 and the 34th overall, which premiered on November 16, 2012, on NBC. The episode was written by series creators Jim Kouf and David Greenwalt from a story by Kouf, and was directed by Karen Gaviola.

== Plot ==
Opening quote: "Oh! There is a terrible witch in that house who spewed her poison over me and scratched me with her long fingernails."

Monroe (Silas Weir Mitchell) walks in on Renard (Sasha Roiz) and Juliette (Bitsie Tulloch) kissing. When Juliette sees him, she leaves. Outside, as Renard leaves, two Hundjägers from the Verrat leave the scene on motorcycles to report to Adalind (Claire Coffee), who has returned from Vienna.

Monroe tells Nick (David Giuntoli) that Juliette kissed a man he doesn't know. Nick confronts Juliette about the man's identity—and she prepares to tell him—but then he changes his mind and says it's no longer any of his business. Hank (Russell Hornsby) is visited by Adalind and after she leaves is attacked by two Hundjägers and ends up in the hospital. He tells Nick that Adalind wants to know who killed her mother.

Adalind calls Renard to tell him she is now affiliated with the Verrat and demands he give her the key—otherwise she will tell Nick his real identity. Adalind visits Juliette; they go to a coffee shop and talk about Nick and the location of the trailer. Nick calls Juliette: discovering she is with Adalind, he and Renard arrive with police officers to arrest her on suspicion of killing her mother. Juliette accuses Nick of using her. In fact, Adalind claims to be happy about getting arrested, insisting it is "safer".

Monroe goes to Adalind's hotel room to find out who else is there, and finds four Hundjägers of the Verrat inside. He lures them to a field where Nick uses a Kanabo (a studded bat) to kill two of them, then questions the female about who Adalind is working for. She is killed by the last Hundjäger, whom Nick then kills. Nick tells Monroe to collect all their IDs and cell phones and take them home.

Nick confronts Adalind, who says she will name the royal she is working for if he hands over the key. Nick moves out of Juliette's house and into Monroe's spare room. Monroe shows him a TV police briefing he recorded given by the person who was making out with Juliette. Nick is stunned to see it is Renard. Meanwhile, Renard has located the trailer.

The episode ends with the statement: "To be continued … Sorry."

== Reception ==
=== Viewers ===
The episode was viewed by 5.03 million people, earning a 1.6/5 in the 18-49 rating demographics on the Nielson ratings scale, ranking second on its timeslot and third for the night in the 18-49 demographics, behind Undercover Boss, and Shark Tank. This was an 8% decrease in viewership from the previous episode, which was watched by 5.21 million viewers with a 1.7/5. This means that 1.6 percent of all households with televisions watched the episode, while 5 percent of all households watching television at that time watched it. With DVR factoring in, the episode was watched by 8.00 million viewers with a 2.8 ratings share in the 18-49 demographics.

=== Critical reviews ===
"Season of the Hexenbiest" received mostly positive reviews. The A.V. Club's Les Chappell gave the episode a "A" grade and wrote, "That all changes in 'Season Of The Hexenbiest' however, an outing that's firmly grounded in the larger world of the show. It presents the return of the mysterious key that Nick's mother promised was part of a larger puzzle dating back to the Crusades, the Verrat's merciless Hundjäger enforcers and the most direct involvement by the Seven Houses in Portland events to date. And perhaps not coincidentally, it also happens to be the best episode the show's done all season ('La Llorona' being a close second), an episode that uses this larger world as an impetus to push several characters out of their holding patterns, where things are said and seen which no one can take back."

Nick McHatton from TV Fanatic, gave a 4.8 star rating out of 5, stating: "'Season of the Hexenbiest' finally brought Nick's line of focus to the man just below his Grimm world: Renard. Of course, this is still Grimm we're talking about, and Nick is still in the dark when it comes Renard's royal blood. But Nick won't let up until he knows exactly what kind of man Renard is because Renard is the person Nick can place blame on for his continually caving personal life."

Shilo Adams from TV Overmind, wrote: "We pick up with where we ended the last episode of Grimm: Renard and Juliette locking lips in the spice shop, but once she sees Monroe, she hightails it to her car and heads home. In addition to her vehicle and Renard's vehicle, both on the road and going different directions, we see two black-clad figures on motorcycles, each with double diamond symbols on their hands. They work for Adalind Schade, the (former?) Hexenbiest that has been a thorn in Nick's paw since the third episode of the series; she had them, a brunette female and a blonde-ish male with longer hair, stalking the Captain in order to gather information on his obsession with Juliette."

Josie Campbell from TV.com wrote, "'Season of the Hexenbiest' was so much better than the last handful of filler episodes, in fact, that I wonder if Grimm is a show that could benefit from a shorter, cable-style season, focusing on a fast-paced and twisty 13 episodes rather than a slow and drawn-out 22 or 24. I, for one, would be willing to sacrifice some of the episodic Wesen-of-the-Week plots to focus more on the Royals vs. the Grimms."
