= Bad Moon Rising (Grimm) =

- Grimm episode
- Episode no.: Season 2 Episode 3
- Directed by: David Solomon
- Written by: Richard Hatem
- Cinematography by: Marshall Adams
- Editing by: Casey Rohrs
- Production code: 203
- Original air date: August 27, 2012
- Running time: 42 minutes

Guest appearances
- Mark Pellegrino as Jarold Kampfer; John Pyper-Ferguson as Hayden Walker; Maddie Hasson as Carly Kampfer

Episode chronology
← Previous "The Kiss"	Next → "Quill"
- Grimm season 2

"Bad Moon Rising" is the 3rd episode of the supernatural drama television series Grimm of season 2 and the 25th overall, which premiered on August 27, 2012, on NBC. The episode was written by Richard Hatem, and was directed by David Solomon.

== Plot ==
Opening quote: "Then she began to weep bitterly, and said, 'What can a poor girl like me do now?"

A girl, Carly (Maddie Hasson), is kidnapped by cousins. Nick (David Giuntoli) shows Juliette (Bitsie Tulloch) photos of the two of them as a couple, in a vain attempt to help her remember him. She remembers other things and people - even his friend Monroe (Silas Weir Mitchell) and the fact that he saved her life - but not Nick.

Hank (Russell Hornsby) is struggling with anxiety and nightmares after everything he has witnessed and visits a therapist. He reacts violently when she touches him, and abruptly ends the session. Carly's father Jarold (Mark Pellegrino), who is a friend of Hank's, asks for help to find her. Nick sees Jarold woge into a Coyotl. From Monroe, he learns that when a female Coyotl reaches 17, her pack performs a violent consummation ritual called "aseveración". The ritual is performed on the night of the full moon - meaning Carly's will be that night.

Suspecting Jarold's brother-in-law Hayden (John Pyper-Ferguson) is involved, Nick and Hank raid his apartment, but discover only dismembered animals. Hank then notices a brochure about a foreclosed property: Nick, Hank and Jarold go there and find Hayden and several other male pack members. Hayden denies knowing where Carly is, but Nick spots the well where she is being hidden: he and Hank pull her out. The in-laws begin shooting and they shelter in a barn. Carly realizes Nick is a Grimm and panics, showing her Coyotl form in front of Hank. Hank, now also in a frenzy, points his gun at her. In trying to calm them both down, Nick is forced to tell Hank that the things he has been seeing are real.

The pack holds Jarold at gunpoint, threatening to kill him if Nick and Hank do not relinquish Carly. Hayden enters the barn, intending to retrieve Carly and kill Nick and Hank. Working together, they subdue and handcuff him, then lure the in-laws inside and arrest them, too. Hank, now content that he is not crazy – or at least not alone in being crazy – is ready to learn about Nick's life as a Grimm. Juliette is released from the hospital and returns home with Nick. Although accepting of what Nick tells her, she still has no memory of him or their relationship, and walks up to her room alone.

== Reception ==
=== Viewers ===
The episode was viewed by 4.67 million people, earning a Nielsen rating of 1.6/4 in the 18–49 demographic. It ranked first on its timeslot and sixth for the night in that demographic, behind reruns of Mike & Molly, The Big Bang Theory, and 2 Broke Girls, and episodes of Hotel Hell and Hell's Kitchen. This was a 5% decrease in viewership from the previous episode, which was watched by 4.90 million viewers with a 1.7/5 rating.

=== Critical reviews ===
"Bad Moon Rising" received positive reviews. The A.V. Club's Kevin McFarland gave the episode a "B+" grade and wrote, "It looks like Grimm is going to leave most of those plates spinning for a while. Renard's origins, the resistance movement, Adalind's whereabouts, Juliette's memory, Nick's mother, those goddamn coins – all of that is on the bench tonight, except for a few ancillary scenes. Instead, 'Bad Moon Rising' is a transformation into Grimm: Special Victims Unit, a tightly plotted standalone that accomplishes one important plot point. Hank is no longer in the dark, and though there are still a lot of questions, it felt right."

Nick McHatton from TV Fanatic gave a 4.1 star rating out of 5, stating: "Ah well, I'm nitpicking. It's exciting to think what Hank might bring to the inside now that he knows the full story. He'll be meeting everyone again for the first time, which will be fun to explore. Grimm Season 2 has started out with great momentum and moved from 'sure, I'll watch it' to 'must see' on my viewing list."

Shilo Adams from TV Overmind wrote: "Through issues of identity, sanity, memory, and family, the residents of Portland have slowly been confronting their personal demons, looking them dead in the eye and daring them to make a move. In 'Bad Moon Rising', an episode where every subplot found a character trying to get back to their idea of 'home', there was indeed some movement in that area."

Josie Campbell from TV.com wrote, "With the reveal of the truth, it's increasingly obvious this is a Grimm radically different than Season 1, determined to throw status quo to the wind rather than milking a plot. Moreover, this Wesen-of-the-week story did not feel like useless filler as so many of the Season 1 episodes did. It stood on its own and delivered a solid crime story that could have honestly been an episode of a regular procedural drama with the barest of retouches. No longer does the show feel segmented into monster episodes versus mythology episodes—just like Hank and Nick, the show is uniting all the separate pieces."
