= The Kiss (Grimm) =

- Grimm episode
- Episode no.: Season 2 Episode 2
- Directed by: Terrence O'Hara
- Written by: Jim Kouf; David Greenwalt
- Cinematography by: Eliot Rockett
- Editing by: George Pilkinton
- Production code: 202
- Original air date: August 20, 2012
- Running time: 42 minutes

Guest appearances
- Jessica Tuck as Catherine Schade; James Frain as Eric Renard; Mike Dopud as Marnassier; Ryan Sands as Lofthouse; Mary Elizabeth Mastrantonio as Kelly Burkhardt

Episode chronology
| ← Previous "Bad Teeth" | Next → "Bad Moon Rising" |
- Grimm season 2

"The Kiss" is the 2nd episode of the supernatural drama television series Grimm of season 2 and the 24th overall, which premiered on August 20, 2012, on NBC. The episode was written by series creators Jim Kouf and David Greenwalt, and was directed by Terrence O'Hara.

== Plot ==
Opening quote: "If a man of pure heart were to fall in love with her, that would bring her back to life."

Nick (David Giuntoli) is attacked by Marnassier (Mike Dopud) and they fight. He is joined by Kelly (Mary Elizabeth Mastrantonio), who kills the Wesen. They race to the hospital where Monroe (Silas Weir Mitchell) and Rosalee (Bree Turner) are waiting with a potion to stop Juliette (Bitsie Tulloch)'s deterioration. Nick administers it as eye drops.

While investigating the murders of Marnassier and the agents, one of the FBI investigators checks a phone at the scene and discovers that Nick was the last person one of the agents called. Renard calls his brother (James Frain) – the man Marnassier called in the previous episode – telling him that Marnassier is dead and confirming that he sent him. The FBI investigators arrest Nick and question him about what happened. Nick argues that the man, a notorious killer, is dead, and they should be giving their agents the credit; with no better option, they release him. Catherine (Jessica Tuck) gives Renard (Sasha Roiz) a purification potion for him to ingest in order to wake Juliette, warning that it will be painful because he is far from pure of heart.

Kelly confronts Catherine, demanding she tell her what she knows about Juliette's condition. Catherine tells her there is a royal prince in Portland, but that if she wants to know more she will have to find out the hard way. They fight and Kelly kills Catherine. Before dying, she says "Only he can save her." Renard drinks the potion and endures its painful effects.

Nick gives Kelly the three coins, which she is to destroy, and takes her to the train station. Once he has driven away, she turns a corner and breaks into a parked car. The purification process finished, Renard goes to the hospital; he kisses Juliette, then quickly leaves. Juliette wakes up. Nick arrives at the hospital. Overjoyed to find Juliette awake, he kisses her. She backs away, saying "Who are you?", and Nick is left dumbfounded.

== Reception ==
=== Viewers ===
The episode was viewed by 4.90 million people, earning a Nielsen rating of 1.7/5 in the 18–49 demographic. It ranked first on its timeslot and fourth for the night in that demographic, behind a rerun of 2 Broke Girls, and episodes of Hotel Hell and Hell's Kitchen. This was a 14% decrease in viewership from the previous episode, which was watched by 5.64 million viewers with a 2.0/5 rating.

=== Critical reviews ===
"The Kiss" received positive reviews. The A.V. Club's Kevin McFarland gave the episode a "B−" grade and wrote, "It's helpful to remember that two of Grimm's creators, David Greenwalt and Jim Kouf, worked on Buffy and Angel, two shows that had a soft spot for two-part television stories within a standard season. 'The Kiss' is the second half of a two-part story, and it instills a little more faith that despite some serious rocky patches, Grimm has a vague idea of where it's going. It may not always deal directly with the overarching mythology – one of the writers confirmed via Twitter that the case-of-the-week structure is returning – but it can stretch out a story over two weeks and make it reasonably interesting."

Nick McHatton from TV Fanatic gave a 4.5 star rating out of 5, stating: "It's too bad NBC didn't premiere Grimm with back-to-back episodes. Because 'The Kiss' kicked off right where 'Bad Teeth' concluded. But, when you're premiering in August and only have so many episodes to go around, this is the result. Still, no complaints are needed."

Josie Campbell from TV.com wrote, "Renard enlightenment aside, the episode was also fun. Monroe and Rosalee's nervous interactions with Mama Nick were a blast and Monroe was pretty adorable in his insistence that he would have killed HexenMom for insulting Rosalee (yes, I know I just described a death threat as adorable. This is Grimm)."
