= Face Off (Grimm) =

- Grimm episode
- Episode no.: Season 2 Episode 13
- Directed by: Terrence O'Hara
- Written by: Jim Kouf; David Greenwalt
- Cinematography by: Marshall Adams
- Editing by: Chris Willingham
- Production code: 213
- Original air date: March 8, 2013
- Running time: 42 minutes

Guest appearance
- None Credited

Episode chronology
← Previous "Season of the Hexenbiest"	Next → "Natural Born Wesen"
- Grimm season 2

"Face Off" is the 13th episode and mid-season premiere of the supernatural drama television series Grimm of season 2 and the 35th overall, which premiered on March 8, 2013, on NBC. The episode was written by series creators Jim Kouf and David Greenwalt, and was directed by Terrence O'Hara.

== Plot ==
Opening quote: "The will to conquer is the first condition of victory."

Nick (David Giuntoli) has just found that it was Renard (Sasha Roiz) who was kissing Juliette (Bitsie Tulloch) in the spice shop. He is then called to investigate a multiple homicide: the same Hundjägers he and Monroe (Silas Weir Mitchell) have just killed.

Renard enters the trailer, searching for the key, but can't find it. At the station, detectives view footage from the hotel of Monroe (face unseen) being followed by the Hundjägers. Monroe calls Rosalee (Bree Turner) to discuss a cure for Juliette and Renard. Renard visits Juliette and they kiss, as Nick watches from a distance. He gets out of the car, bent on confronting them, but gets a call from Monroe, who insists that they can't control their actions and that Rosalee can find a way to cure them. In the house, Juliette and Renard alternate between forced together and desperately trying to stay apart. Finally, Juliette takes Renard's gun and begins shooting randomly, forcing Renard to take back the gun and flee before the police arrive.

Adalind (Claire Coffee) is released from the jail, but Renard forces her to come with him to a lake. He tells her to "fix" him. She says that she can't, but she can make it "better", and they have sex. At the station, Renard finally finds the key in Nick's desk and takes it. In the spice shop, Monroe finally deduces that Renard is the "Royal" in Portland and tells Nick that they need Juliette and Renard to take the purification spell. However, another ingredient required is Adalind's cat. It is lost, so Nick will have to drink the antidote.

Renard lies to Adalind that he couldn't find the key, then calls Nick and tells him they need to meet. They rendezvous at the Postman's house. Nick attacks Renard and realizes that he is a Wesen. Renard explains that he came to return the key, that he knew Nick was a Grimm even before Nick did, and that he is on his side.

In the spice shop, Nick takes the antidote and endures the same pain process that Renard went through. Juliette rushes to his side in distress. In Vienna, Adalind checks a pregnancy test and smiles when it shows positive.

== Reception ==
=== Viewers ===
The episode was viewed by 4.90 million people, earning a 1.5/5 in the 18-49 rating demographics on the Nielson ratings scale, ranking second on its timeslot and third for the night in the 18-49 demographics, behind Last Man Standing, 20/20, and Shark Tank. This was a 3% decrease in viewership from the previous episode, which was watched by 5.03 million viewers with a 1.6/5. This means that 1.5 percent of all households with televisions watched the episode, while 5 percent of all households watching television at that time watched it. With DVR factoring in, the episode was watched by 7.71 million viewers with a 2.7 ratings share in the 18-49 demographics.

=== Critical reviews ===
"Face Off" received positive reviews. The A.V. Club's Kevin McFarland gave the episode a "B+" grade and wrote, "Grimm has shown that when the serialized pieces click into place, it becomes far more compelling. The best case-of-the-week episodes — last season's 'Organ Grinder,' last Halloween's 'La Llorona' — are good examples of how to keep the wheels spinning without losing interest. But the little tidbits of information that expand the Wesen world—the conflict between the rebels, the Verrat, the royals, and the Grimms they traditionally employ — is the most fascinating and important part of a supernatural/fantasy show like this. It's taken quite a while for the mythology and characterization to catch up, but as the characters have been filled in and a clearer picture of what's going on in this world is revealed, Grimm has improved more often than it has stumbled."

Nick McHatton from TV Fanatic, gave a 4.0 star rating out of 5, stating: "'Face Off' was really a culmination of payoffs all of us have been waiting over a year for. Juliette and Renard's actions are beginning to make some sense, Adalind continues to be a great villain, and, most importantly, Nick and Renard finally tip their hands to each other."

Shilo Adams from TV Overmind, wrote: "After hearing that his (ex-?)almost-fiancee had been cheating on him with his boss, Nick is ready to get violent on somebody, preferably Renard. Monroe intervenes before anything could happen, delaying his friend long enough that a call comes in about a quadruple homicide – the quadruple homicide that Nick committed in the fall finale. The four dead bodies – all Verrat, three of them men – were never disposed of nor were they hidden, although taking their ids and doing the act in an area not beholden to surveillance cameras keeps Nick's secret under wraps. For now."

Josie Campbell from TV.com wrote, "But what really made 'Face Off' great was that it got right back to the fast-paced info-dump from the beginning of Season 2. Secrets were revealed in a way that felt satisfying and also gave rise to more questions; characters were thinking as fast as they were reacting, crashing headfirst into the changing status quo. Though I'd be happier if Monroe and Nick had more gradually pieced together the Hexenbiest/Juliette's Memory Loss puzzle over a few episodes instead of figuring it out all at once, once things started to dawn on them, a lot of fun was had."
