= Wasting Away =

2007 film by Matthew Kohnen

- Directed by: Matthew Kohnen
- Written by: Matthew Kohnen; Sean Kohnen
- Produced by: Sean Kohnen
- Starring: Matthew Davis; Julianna Robinson; Michael Grant Terry
- Cinematography: Allan Fiterman
- Edited by: Michael Schwartz; Emily Chiu
- Music by: The Newton Brothers
- Distributed by: Level 33 Entertainment
- Release date: October 16, 2007 (Screamfest)
- Running time: 90 minutes
- Country: United States
- Language: English

Wasting Away (also known as Aaah! Zombies!!) is a 2007 zombie comedy film directed by Matthew Kohnen and starring Matthew Davis, Julianna Robinson, and Michael Grant Terry. The events of the plot take place from the zombies' point of view. The film uses color footage to show the action from the zombies' point of view in which they see themselves as normal humans and occasionally switches to black-and-white footage to show the zombies from the point of view of normal humans.

== Plot ==
In a recording, a military experiment tests Serum XT1258 on a soldier, only to have him turn into a zombie and attack the surgeons. The remainder of the serum is transported away for disposal. However, the soldiers become lost and while they fight over the map, they accidentally run over somebody that had been following them. One of the serum barrels falls out, rolls away, and leaks behind a bowling arcade, contaminating ice cream. Tim, an employee, eats it with his friends: Mike, his crush Cindy, and Vanessa, Mike's ex-girlfriend. All pass out and reanimate into zombies; however they still see themselves as humans. Cindy gets a stomachache, and Vanessa and Tim are unable to call an ambulance because the phone operator speaks and hangs up too fast – everything in the normal world is sped up to zombies – but they simply dismiss it as faulty connections.

When they go outside to look for help, they bump into Nick, a military private who joins them to look for a working phone. When they stumble into a bar and are attacked by its patrons, they exhibit abnormal symptoms, such as increased strength and endurance. Nick then tells them about the serum, and he reveals he was also exposed to it. Nick suspects it has infected most of the population and the five of them are immune because all of them were infected while consuming dairy products, which might have neutralized the serum's toxins. Convinced the military will hunt them down to cover up the incident, Nick proposes they stay together to ensure their safety.

Nick unsuccessfully spies on Colonel South and Dr. Richter, the people responsible for the experiment, and later goes off to steal information about the serum. Cindy and Tim check on Cindy's family while Vanessa and Mike hurry for Vanessa's job interview. Tim accidentally kills Cindy's parents when they throw dynamite at him while he asks for their permission to see her, only for him to throw it back before it explodes. Vanessa presumably kills her would-be employer when she unintentionally scares him into his bedroom and catches him hiding under the bed. Meanwhile, Nick is captured and has his brain waves sped up to understand humans again. Colonel South then reveals the military is planning to eradicate the infected people. After he shows Nick his zombie self, Nick becomes enraged and escapes.

Tim, Cindy, Mike, and Vanessa reunite at the bowling arcade, only to be challenged to a bowling match by Tim's rival Danny and his team, who are all drunk; only drunken people see zombies as humans. Mike and Tim compete against them while Cindy and Vanessa keep them drunk to disorient them. All is well until they run out of beer and Danny's team sees they are truly zombies. A fight breaks out, and Mike is decapitated in the chaos, but his head remains alive. They kill Danny and his teammates when Nick shows up and assists them.

He then reveals the truth to them, and Mike comes up with a plan to defeat the military by infecting most of the soldiers at the headquarters. They gain extra allies by resurrecting the dead bowling teammates with the contaminated ice cream and pose as corpses in a disposal truck on its way to the headquarters. They are almost caught by Colonel South's containment unit, but Mike sacrifices himself to kill them by activating a grenade with his mouth. Once the zombies reach the headquarters, Nick offers himself to Colonel South as a diversion while the others infect the rest of the soldiers present. Furious, Colonel South has Nick taken in alive.

Tim, Cindy, Vanessa and the other zombies populate "Zombie Town", which is erected in memory of Mike and Nick. Colonel South and Dr. Richter plan to torture Nick for treason as a soldier, which he responds to by saying, "I'm not a soldier. I'm a zombie."

== Cast ==
- Matthew Davis as Mike
- Julianna Robinson as Vanessa
- Michael Grant Terry as Tim
- Betsy Beutler as Cindy
- Colby French as Nick Steele
- Richard Riehle as Colonel South
- Jack Orend as Dr. Richter
- Joel McCrary as Mark Kanan
- Tracey Walter as Mr. Whicks
- Oren Skoog as Danny
- Will Stiles as Chad
- Michael Cornacchia as Ronald Rupert Eschelon III
- Larry Weissman as The Drunk

== Release ==
Wasting Away premiered on October 16, 2007, at the Screamfest Horror Film Festival. It was released on DVD on October 19, 2010.

== Reception ==
Dennis Harvey of Variety wrote that although zombie comedies have grown old, the film is "amusing and ingratiating". Allan Hunter of Screen Daily wrote, "Matthew Kohnen's inventive, well-acted romp has cult potential written all over it." J.C. De Leon of Brutal as Hell wrote that the film has "moments of amusing comedy", though it focuses too much on silly humor over horror. Jodie Bass of Beyond Hollywood wrote, "This one really is destined to become a cult classic and rightly so." Michael Rubino of DVD Verdict wrote that the film has a great gimmick but fails to live up to its promise, in part due to its budget. Writing in The Zombie Movie Encyclopedia, Volume 2, academic Peter Dendle said, "Though decidedly risk-averse, Aaah! Zombies!! pursues a conceptually innovative angle with satisfying detail and persistence."
