= Jamie McShane =

American actor

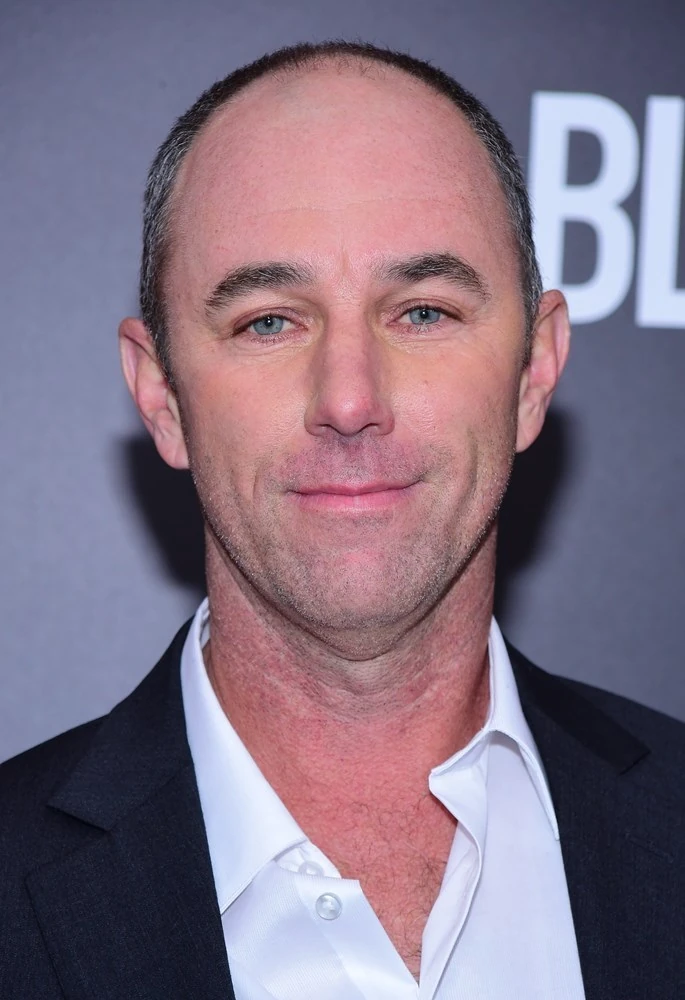
- Education: University of Richmond
- Occupation: Actor
- Years active: 1997–present

Jamie McShane is an American actor best known for his roles on Sons of Anarchy, Southland, and Bloodline, and as Agent Jackson in the Marvel Cinematic Universe (MCU) films Thor (2011) and The Avengers (2012). In 2021, he appeared as the attorney Anson Wix, the main antagonist of the crime thriller television series CSI: Vegas first season. In 2022, he played Det. Lankford in the Netflix series, The Lincoln Lawyer, and Sheriff Galpin in Wednesday.

== Early life ==
McShane grew up in Northern New Jersey with his four siblings. He got his BA in English at the University of Richmond in 1988.

== Career ==
McShane has had a long career with many guest and recurring roles on television series such as 24, House, Stalker, Fear the Walking Dead, and The Fosters. His most notable roles are Cameron Hayes in Sons of Anarchy, Sergeant Terry Hill in Southland, and Eric O'Bannon in Bloodline. McShane will also have a recurring role in CSI: Vegas.

McShane's film work includes Gone Girl and Argo.

In October 2016, McShane was given the Maltese Falcon award for his character portrayal of Eric O'Bannon on the TV series Bloodline. The award was given by the Humphrey Bogart Film Festival in Key Largo and presented by Humphrey Bogart's son Stephen.

== Filmography ==
=== Film ===
Year	Title	Role	Notes
1997	Macon County Jail	Deputy 1	
1998	The Census Taker	Michael Jacoby	Short film
2002	Landspeed	Miles Vanover	
2002	Go for Broke	Detective Ross	
2002	Legend of the Phantom Rider	Victor	
2002	Fine.	Ed	Short film
2003	The Gidge	Father Lonergan	Short film
2003	Grand Theft Parsons	Radio Announcer	
2004	Chasing Daylight	Dad	Short film
2004	You Are So Going to Hell!	Federico	
2005	Hostage	Joe Mack	
2005	Today You Die	Vincent	Video
2006	Gridiron Gang	Referee	
2007	Mr. Brooks	Crime Lab Technician	
2007	Nicky's Birthday Camera	Dave	
2007	Look	Berry Krebbs	
2008	Quid Pro Quo	Man on Sidewalk	
2008	Fragments	Stickman	
2008	Pride and Glory	Lieutenant Fricker	
2008	The Haunting of Molly Hartley	Laurel's Father	
2009	The Disco Principal	Dad	
2011	Thor	Agent Jackson	
2011	In My Pocket	Jerry	
2011	Henry	Mark	Short film
2012	The Avengers	Agent Jackson (Celebration Montage Interviewee)	
2012	Argo	William J. Daugherty	
2012	Flare: The Hunt	Burke	
2014	50 to 1	Dave Cotey	
2014	Nightcrawler	Freaked Motorist	
2014	Gone Girl	Donnelly	
2014	The Crop	The Man	Short film
2017	The Meanest Man in Texas	Captain Colt	
2018	Gone Are the Days	Doctor Jenkins	
2019	Togo	Scott Allan	
2020	Mank	Shelly Metcalf	
2021	Unspoken	Walt/Walter	Short film
2023	A Great Divide	George McNather	
2024	The Vortex	The Pit Boss	

=== Television ===
Key
†	Denotes works that have not yet been released

Year	Title	Role	Notes
2001	Once and Again	Marshal #2	Episode: "Armageddon"
2001	Black Scorpion	Charge #2	Episode: "Power Play"
2001	Angel	Rebel #2 / Demon	2 episodes
2001	The Division	Patrolman #1	Episode: "Virgin Territory"
2001	Six Feet Under	Paramedic	Episode: "Knock, Knock"
2001	Philly	Detective	Episode: "Pilot"
2001	Becker	Customer	Episode: "Really Good Advice"
2001	Star Trek: Enterprise	Tactical Crewman	Episode: "The Andorian Incident"
2001–2002	NYPD Blue	Detective Paul Winslow / Eaton	2 episodes
2001–2005	CSI: Crime Scene Investigation	Eddie Vonner / Jeff Berlin	2 episodes
2002	Crossing Jordan	Hotel Manager	Episode: "Lost and Found"
2002	The X-Files	Injured Soldier	Episode: "Providence"
2002	Alias	C.I.A. Agent	Episode: "The Enemy Walks In"
2002	Firefly	Man	Episode: "Serenity"
2003	Fastlane	Officer Burton	Episode: "Popdukes"
2003	Tremors	Charlie Wilhelm	Episode: "Ghost Dance"
2003	ER	Josh Rushing	Episode: "Finders Keepers"
2003	Monk	Iverson, Grounds Keeper	Episode: "Mr. Monk Goes Back to School"
2003	Nip/Tuck	Father Michael Shannon	Episode: "Cara Fitzgerald"
2003	Boomtown	Criminologist / CSU	2 episodes
2003	The Handler	Police Officer	Episode: "Bruno Comes Back"
2003–2004	24	Gerry Whitehorn	6 episodes
2004	Deadwood	Ned Mason	Episode: "Deadwood"
2004	Dragnet		Episode: "Frame of Mind"
2004	The West Wing	Dr. Hardin	Episode: "Third-Day Story"
2004	Cold Case	Leroy Lambert 1985	Episode: "Mind Hunters"
2005	Strong Medicine	Immigration official	Episode: "Implants, Transplants and Cuban Aunts"
2005	Numb3rs	Paul Ballard	Episode: "Prime Suspect"
2005	Without a Trace	Robert Healy	Episode: "Transitions"
2005	Blind Justice	Greg Hermanson	Episode: "Past Imperfect"
2006	Commander in Chief	Andrew Dugan	2 episodes
2006	Close to Home	Robert Waters	Episode: "Community"
2006	CSI: Miami	Timothy Nash	Episode: "Death Eminent"
2006	Criminal Minds	Peter Chambers	Episode: "North Mammon"
2006–2007	The Nine	Henry Vartak	5 episodes
2007	Heartland	Hal York	Episode: "A Beautiful Day"
2007	The ½ Hour News Hour	Timothy Cox	12 episodes
2007	K-Ville	Deputy Carlsson	Episode: "Cobb's Webb"
2007	Women's Murder Club	Henry Dow	Episode: "The Past Comes Back to Haunt You"
2008	My Name Is Earl	Carter O'Dell	2 episodes
2008	The Riches	Declan Cassidy	Episode: "Trust Never Sleeps"
2008	The Closer	Brian Monroe	Episode: "Problem Child"
2008	The Mentalist	Jack Tanner	Episode: "Red Tide"
2008	My Own Worst Enemy	Daniel Shaw	Episode: "Henry and the Terrible... Day"
2008–2010	Sons of Anarchy	Cameron Hayes	12 episodes
2009	Psych	Roger	Episode: "Six Feet Under the Sea"
2009	The Unit	Detective Renner	Episode: "Endgame"
2009	Raising the Bar		Episode: "I'll Be Down to Get You in a Taxi, Honey"
2009	The Cleaner		Episode: "The Things We Didn't Plan"
2009	Dark Blue	Frank	Episode: "Betsy"
2009	Crash	Chuck P.I.	Episode: "Always See Your Face"
2009	Lincoln Heights	Special Agent Cooper	Episode: "Aftershock"
2010	Saving Grace	Travis Gabriel	Episode: "Hear the Birds?"
2010	House	Cpt. McCreaney	Episode: "Help Me"
2010	Miami Medical	Detective King	Episode: "Like a Hurricane"
2010	Chase		Episode: "Above the Law"
2010	NCIS	Samuel Hayes	Episode: "False Witness"
2011	Breakout Kings	Xavier Price	Episode: "Collected"
2011	Castle	Tony 'The Butcher' Valtini	Episode: "Heroes and Villains"
2011–2013	Southland	Sergeant Terry Hill	19 episodes
2012	Longmire	Bill Hoback	Episode: "A Damn Shame"
2012	Franklin & Bash	Julian Aroyan	Episode: "L'affaire Du Coeur"
2012	Breaking Bad	Wallace	Episode: "Dead Freight"
2012	CSI: NY	Mitch Ventri	Episode: "Misconceptions"
2012	Grimm	Johnny Kreski	Episode: "To Protect and Serve Man"
2012	Vegas	Davey Cornaro	2 episodes
2013	Ironside	Detective Callahan	2 episodes
2013	Touch	Mike O'Brien	Episode: "Clockwork"
2013	King & Maxwell	Ray Martin	2 episodes
2013	Ghost Ghirls	Agent Polaski	Episode: "Hooker with a Heart of Ghoul"
2013	Welcome to the Family	Officer Simon	Episode: "The Big RV Adventure"
2013	Cinnamon Girl	Mr. Carter	TV movie
2013	Killing Kennedy	Richard Snyder	TV movie
2013	The Advocates	Detective Murphy	TV movie
2014	Maron	Clint	Episode: "White Truck"
2014–2016	Murder in the First	M.E. Justin Burnside	19 episodes
2014–2017	Scorpion	Patrick Quinn	5 episodes
2014–2018	The Fosters	Donald Jacob	7 episodes
2015	Law & Order: Special Victims Unit	Luke Davis	Episode: "Decaying Morality"
2015	Stalker	Gene Meadows	Episode: "Fun and Games"
2015	Fear the Walking Dead	Lt. Moyers	2 episodes
2015–2017	Bloodline	Eric O'Bannon	30 episodes
2017	Training Day	Special Agent Gerald Lynch	Episode: "Faultlines"
2018	Unsolved	Detective Fred Miller	10 Episodes
2018	Bosch	Detective Francis Sheehan	10 Episodes
2019	The Passage	Dr. Tim Fanning	
2020	Star Trek: Picard	Zhaban	3 episodes
2020	Seal Team	Captain Greyson Lindell	
2020	How to Get Away with Murder	U.S. Attorney Lennox	2 episodes
2021	CSI: Vegas	Anson Wix	Recurring role
2021	Animal Kingdom	Max	4 episodes
2022	The Lincoln Lawyer	Det. Lankford	10 episodes
2022; 2025	Wednesday	Sheriff Donovan Galpin	Main role (Season 1); Recurring (Season 2) 11 episodes
2022–2025	1923	Marshal Nathan Kent	
2025	Task	Perry Dorazo	6 episodes
TBA	Myron Bolitar	Ray Dimonte	Main role, upcoming series
