= Alice Evans =

British-American actress

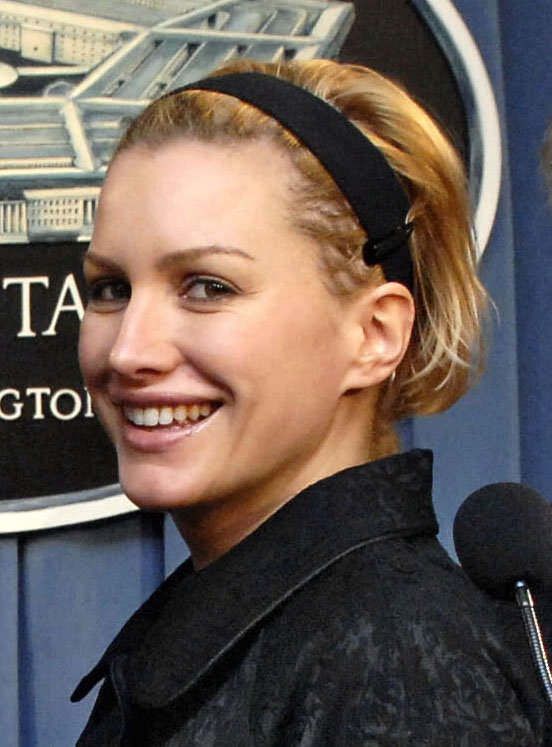
- Evans during a tour of the Pentagon in 2006
- Born: Alice Jane Evans; New Jersey, U.S.
- Citizenship: United Kingdom; United States
- Occupation: Actress
- Years active: 1996–2018
- Spouse: Ioan Gruffudd (m. 2007; div. 2023)
- Children: 2
- Parent: David Evans

Alice Evans is a British-American actress. She played Chloe Simon in the film 102 Dalmatians and Esther Mikaelson in the third season of the CW's The Vampire Diaries and its spin off The Originals.

== Early life ==
Evans was born in New Jersey, U.S., the daughter of a professor in applied mathematics and a teacher of English literature, and was raised in Bristol, England. She attended Henbury School, along with her two brothers. She graduated from University College London with a degree in French and Italian.

== Career ==
After graduation, she enrolled at the Cours Florent in Paris. She gained work in French television, with her breakthrough role as French student Susan in the French sitcom, Elisa Top Model, which ran for 18 months. Next, she went to Italy to play "Nathalie", in the 1998 Italian miniseries Le ragazze di Piazza di Spagna. Her first English-speaking role was in the Highlander episode 'Patient Number 7'. After making her first film, Monsieur Naphtali (1999), director Claude Lelouch cast Evans as Macha in Une pour toutes (1999), alongside Samy Naceri and Anne Parillaud.

In 1999, Disney cast Evans alongside Glenn Close, Gérard Depardieu, and her later husband, Ioan Gruffudd, in 102 Dalmatians.

After appearing in Blackball, she moved to Los Angeles in 2003. She has since appeared in both in films and in television series, including The Mentalist, Brothers & Sisters, Lost, and Grimm. Evans also had a recurring turn as the villainous Esther on The Vampire Diaries and The Originals.

== Personal life ==
Evans met actor Ioan Gruffudd during the filming of 102 Dalmatians. They became engaged on New Year's Day 2006 and married on 14 September 2007 in Mexico. They have two daughters, born in 2009 and 2013. In January 2021, Evans announced their separation, which Gruffudd initiated. In March 2021, Gruffudd filed for divorce from Evans. In February 2022, Gruffudd was granted a temporary domestic violence restraining order against Evans; he was then granted a three-year permanent restraining order in August 2022. In January 2023, Evans faced charges over allegedly breaching her restraining order on two occasions. Evans pleaded not guilty to the charges, which were dropped in March 2023. In February 2026, the restraining order was renewed for five years, due to repeated violations.

In 2017, following a slew of sexual assault allegations against film producer Harvey Weinstein, Evans claimed that Weinstein had made sexual advances towards her in 2002, which she had declined. Evans said that Weinstein insinuated that her rejection would affect her and Gruffudd's careers.

== Filmography ==
=== Film ===
Year	Title	Role	Notes
1998	Rewind	Helga	
1999	The Escort	Sue	
2000	One 4 All	Macha Desachy	
2000	102 Dalmatians	Chloe Simon	
2001	My Wife Maurice	Emmanuelle	
2002	The Abduction Club	Catherine Kennedy	
2003	Blackball	Kerry Speight	
2004	Fascination	Kelly Vance	
2005	Four Corners of Suburbia	Susan Harris	
2006	Hollywood Dreams	Vida	
2006	The Christmas Card	Faith Spelman	
2006	Dangerous Parking	Etta	
2007	Save Angel Hope	Sonia Zeller	
2007	Agent Crush	Alex	Voice
2009	Reunion	Minerva	
2013	Liars All	Sandra	
2018	The Liquid Psychologist	Herself	Short

=== Television ===
Year	Title	Role	Notes
1996–99	Elisa Top Modèle	Clara	22 episode; aka Elisa
1996	Strangers	Charlotte	Episode: "Crash"
1997	Highlander: The Series	Kyra	Episode: "Patient Number 7"
1998	Au cœur de la loi	Muriel Highsmith	Episode: "En vert et contre tous"
1998	H	Sabri's Girlfriend	Episode: "Une belle maman"
1998–2000	Le Ragazze di Piazza di Spagna	Nathalie	6 episodes
2001	Best of Both Worlds	Diane Sullivan	3 episodes
2003	CSI: Miami	Leslie Warner	Episode: "Bait"
2006	Mayo	Clair Wishart	Episode: "Killing Me Softly"
2006	The Christmas Card	Faith Spelman	Television film
2007	Curb Your Enthusiasm	Heather Mills	Voice; episode: "The Freak Book"
2009	Lost	Younger Eloise Hawking	3 episodes
2010	The Mentalist	Ilsa Engels	Episode: “Red Letter”
2010	Brothers & Sisters	Dr. Evans	Episode: "Get a Room"
2011–12	The Vampire Diaries	Esther Mikaelson	6 episodes
2011	Brothers & Sisters	Dr. Felicity Milton	Episode: "Brody"
2011	American Dad!	Birth Show Narrator	Episode: "Home Wrecker"
2012	Grimm	Mia Gaudot	Episode: "Over My Dead Body"
2014–15	The Originals	Esther Mikaelson	3 episodes

=== Video games ===
Year	Title	Role	Notes
1996	MegaRace 2	Co-host of the racing show MegaRace 2	Her name is different each time it is mentioned.
