= Michael Grant Terry =

American actor (born 1983)

- Born: August 30, 1984 (age 42); Philadelphia, Pennsylvania, U.S
- Education: Emerson College
- Occupation: Actor
- Years active: 2005–present
- Spouse: Christine Ciraolo (m. 2015)
- Children: 1

Michael Grant Terry (born August 30, 1984) is an American actor, known for his recurring role as Wendell Bray on the Fox series Bones.

== Biography ==
Terry was born in Philadelphia, Pennsylvania, the youngest of three children. His father is Will Terry, a former English teacher at the Germantown Friends School, which Michael attended. His mother is Holly Terry, a former third grade teacher at Plymouth Meeting Friends School. He is married to Christine Ciraolo, who was a casting director for Bones. They have a daughter (born September 2019).

He studied cinematography and drama at Emerson College in Boston. During his time at Emerson, he made two student films: Blessed Is He and The Right to Bear Arms. In 2002, he apprenticed at the prestigious Williamstown Theatre Festival, where he worked on many main stage productions. Shortly thereafter, he moved to Los Angeles, where he worked with Noah Wyle's The Blank Theatre Company. He is also a member of L.A.'s the Brimmer Street Theatre Company. Terry starred in All Your Hard Work, written by Miles Brandman and directed by Michael Matthews in July 2012.

== Filmography ==
Film
Year	Title	Role	Notes
2007	The Son of Sam's Daughter	Ben	Short film
2007	Roman Candles	Dan	Short film
2007	Wasting Away	Tim	
2009	The Assistants	Carl Dresden	
2009	Post Grad	College grad	
2014	Licking Lemons	Don	Short film

Television
Year	Title	Role	Notes
2005	Cold Case	Penn student	Episode: "Saving Patrick Bubley"
2005	South of Nowhere	Will	Episode: "Girls Guide to Dating"
2005	E-Ring	American boy	Episode: "The General"
2006	Veronica Mars	Sully	Episode: "Of Vice and Men"
2006	CSI: NY	Matt Huxley	Episode: "And Here's to You, Mrs. Azrael"
2008	Without a Trace	Daniel Ellerbe	Episode: "Article 32"
2008–2017	Bones	Wendell Bray	Recurring role, 42 episodes
2008	Eleventh Hour	Lenny Reese	Episode: "Flesh"
2010	The Defenders	Jeff Howard	Episode: "Nevada v. Carter"
2010	Criminal Minds	Christopher Salters	Episode: "Middle Man"
2011	The Closer	Chris Wycott	Episode: "Forgive Us Our Trespasses"
2011	CSI: Crime Scene Investigation	Ryan Thomas	Episode: "Bittersweet"
2012	Castle	Jordan Norris	Episode: "Dial M for Mayor"
2012	In Plain Sight	Brockton Jr.	Episode: "The Anti-Social Network"
2012	Grimm	Ryan Smulson	3 episodes
2013	NCIS	Theodore Lemere	Episode: "Seek"
2013	Grimm	Teen #2	Episode: "Twelve Days of Krampus"
2014	Houdini	Sol	Miniseries; episode: "Part 1"
2014	Stalker	Kurt Wild	Episode: "Pilot"
2015	Stitchers	Scott Ross	Episode: "Connection"
2015	NCIS: New Orleans	Toby Fontaine	Episode: "Darkest Hour"
2023	Station 19	Officer Jones	Episode: "We Build Then We Break"

Web
Year	Title	Role	Notes
2007	Honesty	Boss	Episode: "Bathroom"
