= Robert Blanche =

American film and television actor (1962–2020)

- Born: Robert Clinton Blanche; March 30, 1962; Pomona, California, U.S.
- Died: January 3, 2020 (aged 57); Seattle, Washington, U.S.
- Occupation: Actor

Robert Clinton Blanche (March 30, 1962 – January 3, 2020) was an American film and television actor.

== Early life ==
Blanche was born in Pomona, California, and raised in Oregon.

== Career ==
Beginning his film and television career in 1994, Blanche appeared in over seventy film and television projects. Among other works, he recurred in a guest-starring role as Lt. Bonanno (and later Capt. Det. Bonanno) on three seasons of the TNT series Leverage. He recurred in the role of Sgt. Franco on NBC's Grimm.

== Personal life ==
Blanche was married to Christine Blanche and had five daughters.

== Death ==
Blanche suffered from lung disease for an extended period, and underwent a lung transplant in 2018. He died from complications of the disease in 2020.

== Filmography ==
=== Film ===
Year	Title	Role	Notes
1994	Imaginary Crimes	Policeman #1	Uncredited
1997	Total Reality	Policeman	
1998	Zero Effect	Paramedic #1	
1998	Inconceivable	Fred	
2000	Men of Honor	Shore Patrolman	
2002	Twelve City Blocks	Billy	
2002	Murderous Camouflage	Gimp	
2003	The Hunted	Crumley	Uncredited
2003	The Job	Nightclub Guy	
2003	The Skin Horse	Bob Ano	
2004	Dandelion	Sheriff Teft	
2004	Shooting Nick	Nick	Also writer and producer
2004	Two Fisted	Vincent	
2004	What the Bleep Do We Know!?	Bob	
2004	Loser's Lounge	Kirby	
2004	The Dust Factory	Ryan Flynn Sr.	
2004	Coming Up Easy	Step Father	
2005	Thumbsucker	'The Line' - Partner	
2005	The Heater	Dr. Ted Berger	
2005	Good Teeth	Broker	
2005	Say Uncle	Phil	
2006	What the Bleep!?: Down the Rabbit Hole	Bob	
2006	Punk Love	Dick	
2006	World Trade Center	WTC Desk Officer Massi	
2006	Raising Flagg	Matt Durwood	
2008	Come Hell or Highwater	Griff	
2009	Without a Paddle: Nature's Calling	Massey	
2009	The Hitmen Diaries: Charlie Valentine	Wiseass	
2009	The Perfect Game	Bridgeport Coach	Uncredited
2010	Extraordinary Measures	Armed Guard	
2010	Forge	Mr. Boyes	
2011	Bucksville	Lt. Col. Frank Gartner	
2011	Wake Before I Die	Thomas Schmidt	
2011	American Disciples	Liam Mahony	
2012	Gone	Officer Johnson	Uncredited
2012	Hope	Mark Zeimer	
2013	Foreclosed	Deputy Dolan	
2014	Bullet	Tarvis	
2014	Something Wicked	John	
2015	The A-List	Mr. Bruner	
2016	Undeserved	Woody	
2017	The Two Dogs	Billy Bastard	
2017	Tomorrow, Maybe	Lloyd Hayek	Also writer and producer
2019	American Brothers	Liam Mahoney	
2020	The Brain That Wouldn't Die	Detective Mancini	
TBA	You Can't Win	Cy	

=== Television ===
Year	Title	Role	Notes
1995	Dead By Sunset	Bailiff	Episode #1.2
1995, 1996	Nowhere Man	Security Guard / Chauffeur	2 episodes
1998	Significant Others	Crew Member	Episode: "The Shoot"
1998	Ally McBeal	Officer	Episode: "Happy Trails"
1999	Take My Advice: The Ann and Abby Story	Rory Lipson	Television film
1999	Where the Truth Lies	Stu Varga	Television film
1999	Switched at Birth	Dr. Nerenberg	Television film
2001	Boston Public	Officer	Episode: "Chapter Fifteen"
2001	Resurrection Blvd.	Officer Hicks	Episode: "La agonia y el extasis"
2002	Rose Red	Mr. George Wheaton	2 episodes
2005	Medium	Robert Pulaski	Episode: "In Sickness and Adultery"
2005	It's Always Sunny in Philadelphia	Detective Jones	Episode: "Gun Fever"
2005	NCIS	Brett Willis	Episode: "Silver War"
2006	ER	Detective Milne	Episode: "If Not Now"
2006	Monk	Union Vice President	Episode: "Mr. Monk and the Garbage Strike"
2007	Ghost Whisperer	Ray Billings	Episode: "The Underneath"
2007	Without a Trace	Det. Lou Chambers	Episode: "Baggage"
2009	Crash	Tommy Vanderbeck	Episode: "Can't Explain"
2009–2011	Leverage	Patrick Bonanno	6 episodes
2010	A Walk in My Shoes	Alex	Television film
2010	Nick Bradley Might Be an Alcoholic	Jerry	Television film
2011	Zombie Apocalypse	Brockton	Television film
2012-2017	Grimm	Sgt. Franco	34 episodes
2013, 2018	Portlandia	Various roles	2 episodes
2014	Perception	Dan Bukowski	Episode: "Curveball"
2014	Bermuda Tentacles	Captain Dave Williams	Television film
2014	Grimm: Meltdown	Sgt. Franco	4 episodes
2015	Rizzoli & Isles	Dana Slowey	Episode: "In Plain View"
2015	Stormageddon	Agent Gates	Television film
2015	Runestone: Sizzle Reel	Styrkarr Naeskunungr	Episode: "Beyond the Edges of the World"
2016	Z Nation	John J. Lannister	Episode: "Election Day"
2017	Number One	Gino	Episode #1.1
