= Russell Hornsby =

American actor

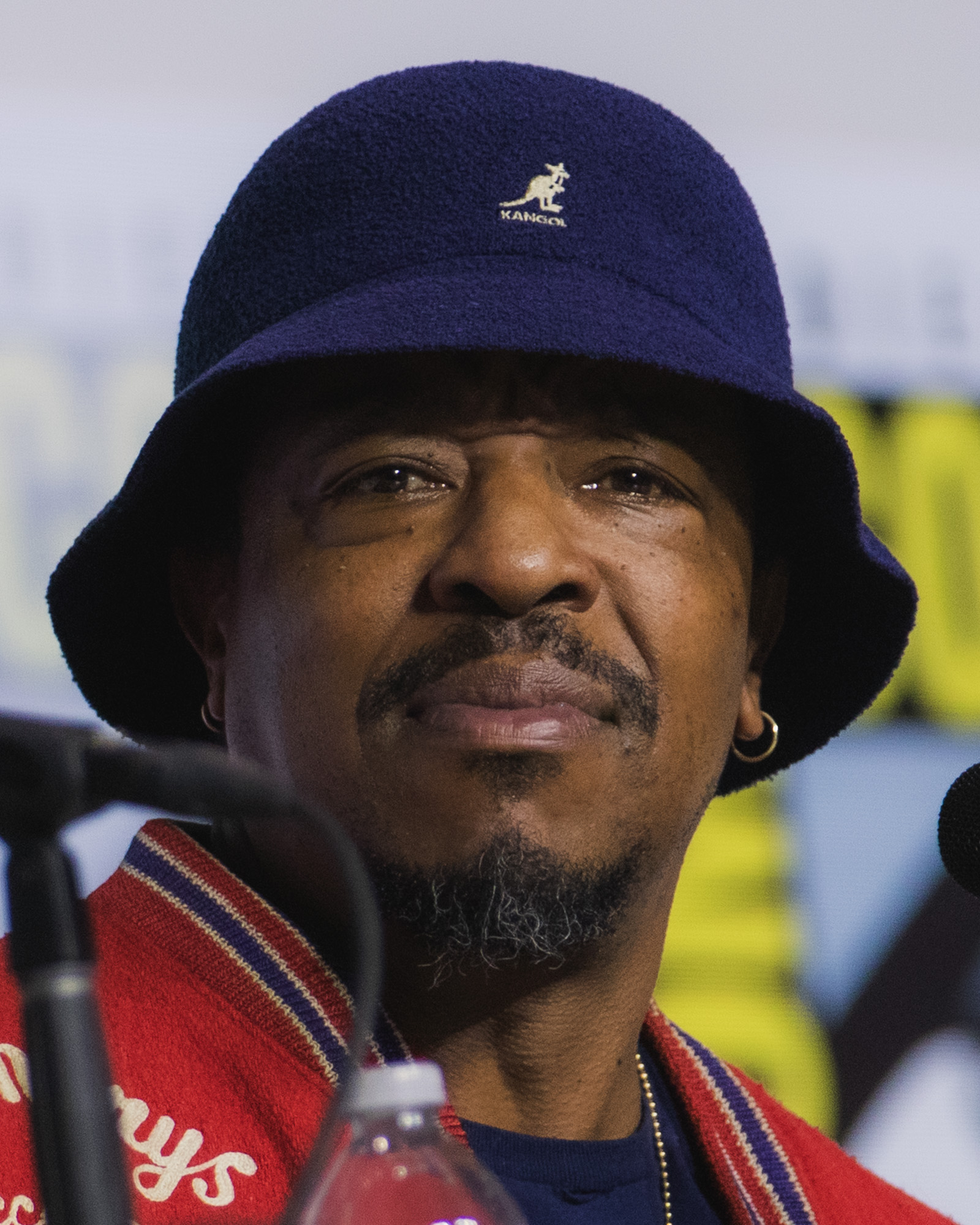
- Hornsby in 2026
- Born: May 15, 1974 (age 52); San Francisco, California, U.S.
- Years active: 1997–present
- Spouse: Denise Walker (m. 2008)
- Children: 2

Russell Hornsby (born May 15, 1974) is an American actor. He is known for his roles as Edward "Eddie" Sutton on ABC Family's Lincoln Heights, as Luke on the HBO drama In Treatment, as Detective Hank Griffin on the NBC series Grimm, and as Lyons in the movie Fences. He also played Carl Gatewood in the Showtime TV series The Affair, and as Charles Flenory in BMF.

== Early life and education ==
Hornsby was born in San Francisco, California. He was a football player and track star at St. Mary’s College High School in Berkeley, California. He auditioned for a spring musical and got the role of the Scarecrow in The Wiz. After that, he became very interested in theatre and acting and was highly involved with the rest of the school theatrical productions.

After graduating, he studied theater at Boston University, from which he graduated with a degree in performance. After graduation, Hornsby continued his studies at the British American Drama Academy in Oxford.

== Career ==
After finishing his studies at Oxford, Hornsby moved to New York City and was subsequently cast in leading roles in Off Broadway productions of To Kill a Mockingbird (as Atticus Finch), Joe Louis Blues, and Six Degrees of Separation (as Paul).

In the late 1990s, he decided to move to Los Angeles in order to transition into television and film. He has appeared in several different television productions including appearing in recurring roles in Haunted as Detective Marcus Bradshaw and Gideon's Crossing as Chief Resident Dr. Aaron Boise. His other television credits include Grey's Anatomy, Law & Order, and In Justice among others. He also played running back Leon Taylor in ESPN's drama series Playmakers.

On the big screen, he has appeared in such films as After the Sunset, Big Fat Liar, Get Rich or Die Tryin', Keep the Faith, Baby, Meet the Parents, and Stuck among others. In 2000, Hornsby appeared in the Off-Broadway production of Jitney for which he won a Drama Desk Award and an Obie Award.

He starred in the NBC fantasy drama Grimm from 2011 to 2017. In 2018, he played Isaiah Butler in the Netflix crime drama Seven Seconds. That same year, Hornsby joined the cast of the movie Creed II. In 2021, he went on to star in the Starz crime drama television series BMF, with costars Eric Kofi-Abrefa, Da'Vinchi and Demetrius Flenory Jr., who played Demetrius Flenory Sr.

== Filmography ==
=== Film ===
Year	Title	Role	Notes
1998	Woo	Guy	
2000	Meet the Parents	Late Night Courier (Right Bag)	
2000	Train Ride	Ellis	
2002	Big Fat Liar	Marcus Duncan	
2002	Milk and Honey	Isaiah	Short
2004	The Male Groupie	Blase' skippy	Short
2004	After the Sunset	Jean Paul	
2005	Edmond	Shill	
2005	Get Rich or Die Tryin'	Odell	
2006	Forgiven	Ronald Bradler	
2006	Something New	Dr. Borcklond	
2007	Stuck	Rashid	
2008	Dear Me	He	Video Short
2010	Salvation Road	Kearn	Short
2012	LUV	Detective Pratt	
2016	The Breaks	Sampson King	
2016	Fences	Lyons Maxson	
2018	Fevah	Jelani	Short
2018	The Hate U Give	Maverick 'Mav' Carter	
2018	Creed II	Buddy Marcelle	
2021	R#J	Captain Prince	
2022	Last Seen Alive	Detective Paterson	
2024	The Supremes at Earl's All-You-Can-Eat	Richmond	
2025	The Woman in the Yard	David	
2026	Give Me Some Sugah		Post-production

=== Television ===
Year	Title	Role	Notes
1993	Bill Nye the Science Guy	Food Truck Assistant	Episode: “Digestion”
1999	Law & Order	Danny Ruiz	Episode: "Marathon"
2000	Wonderland	Hospital Receptionist	Episode: "20/20 Hindsight"
2000–2001	Gideon's Crossing	Dr. Aaron Boies	Main cast
2002	Haunted	Marcus Bradshaw	Main cast
2002	Keep the Faith, Baby	Joe Schiller	TV movie
2003	Girlfriends	Antoine Childs	Episode: "The Wedding"
2003	Playmakers	Leon Taylor	Main cast
2004	Century City	Mr. Skobel	Episode: "A Mind Is a Terrible Thing to Lose"
2005	Grey's Anatomy	Digby Owens	Episode: "The Self-Destruct Button"
2005	Law & Order: Special Victims Unit	Alvin Dutch	Episode: "Storm"
2006	In Justice	Luther Cain	Episode: "Pilot"
2007–2009	Lincoln Heights	Edward "Eddie" Sutton	Main cast
2008	Fear Itself	Sergeant Wiliams	Episode: "Eater"
2009	In Treatment	Luke	Recurring cast (season 2)
2010	The Good Wife	Dr. Shawn Wesley	Episode: "Painkiller"
2011	FutureStates	Kaya Guidry	Episode: "Remigration"
2011	Shameless	Tony's Partner	Episode: "Daddyz Girl" & "Father Frank, Full of Grace"
2011–2015	Suits	Quentin Sainz	Episode: "Dirty Little Secrets" & "Faith"
2011–2017	Grimm	Detective Hank Griffin	Main cast
2017	The Breaks	Sampson King	Episode: "It's Just Begun"
2018	Seven Seconds	Isaiah Butler	Main cast
2018–2019	The Affair	Carl Gatewood	Recurring cast (season 4-5)
2019	Proven Innocent	Ezekiel "EZ" Boudreau	Main cast
2020	Lincoln Rhyme: Hunt for the Bone Collector	Lincoln Rhyme	Main cast
2021	Aftershock	CO	Episode: "Chapter 8: Hell of a night for..."
2021	BMF	Charles Flenory	Main cast
2021	Lost in Space	Grant Kelly	Recurring cast (season 3)
2022	Mike	Don King	

=== Video games ===
Year	Title	Role
2008	Army of Two	Tyson Rios
2009	Terminator Salvation	Rogers, Resistance Soldier
