= Sasha Roiz =

Israeli-Canadian actor (born 1973)

- סשה רויז
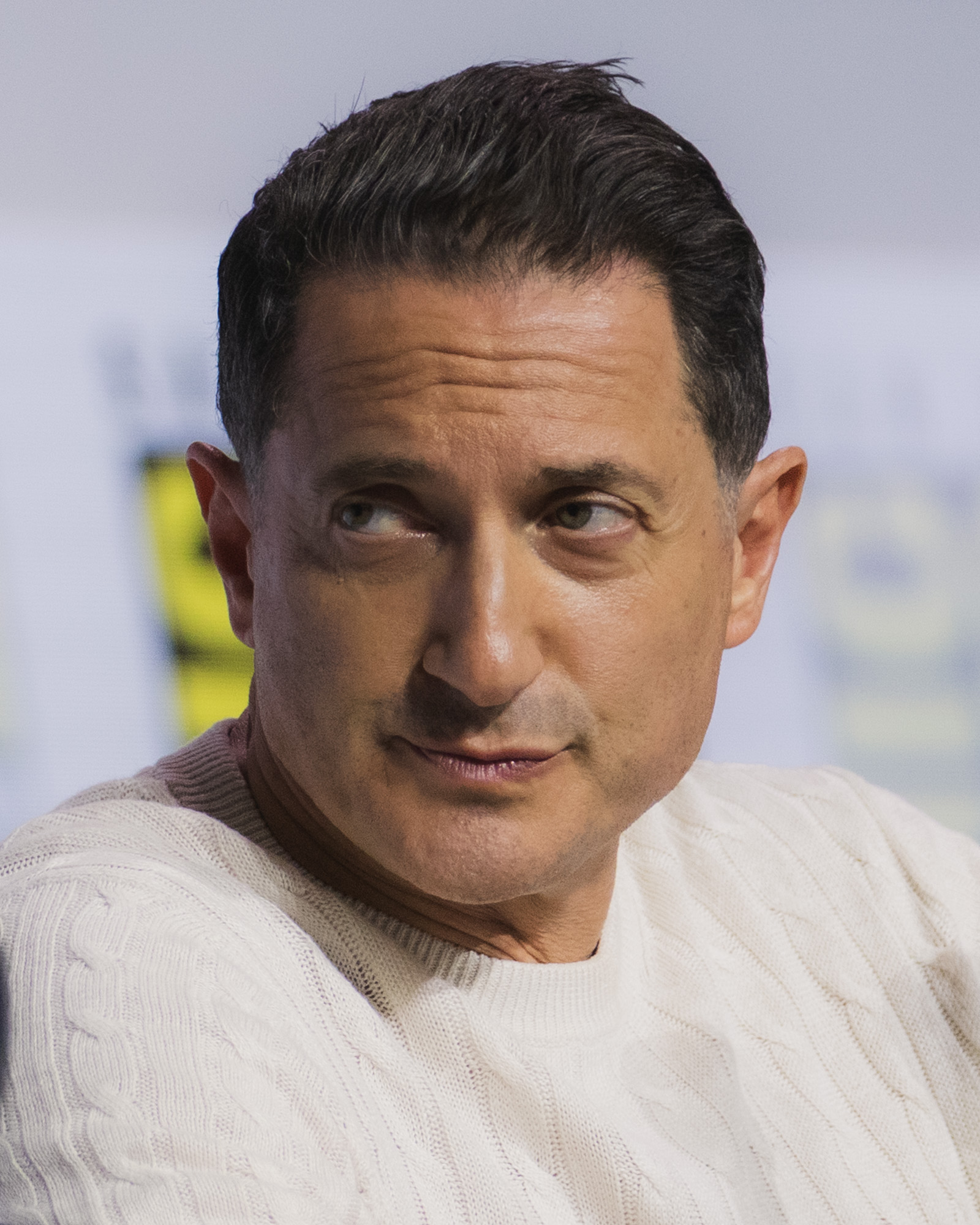
- Roiz at San Diego Comic-Con in 2026
- Born: October 21, 1973 (age 53); Tel Aviv, Israel
- Education: Guildford School of Acting
- Occupation: Actor
- Years active: 2001–present

Sasha Roiz (Hebrew: סשה רויז; born October 21, 1973) is an Israeli-Canadian actor known for his portrayals of Sam Adama in the science-fiction television series Caprica and Captain Sean Renard in the American fantasy television series Grimm.

== Early life ==
Roiz was born in Tel Aviv to Russian Jewish parents. The family moved to Montreal in 1980. Roiz studied history before joining a theatre school in Montreal. He later graduated from the Guildford School of Acting in Guildford, Surrey.

== Career ==
Roiz has appeared in a number of popular television dramas, including CSI: Miami, House, NCIS, The Mentalist, Lie To Me and Terminator: The Sarah Connor Chronicles. He had a recurring role on Warehouse 13 as Marcus Diamond.

In 2008, Roiz landed the role of Sam Adama on Caprica, a spin-off of Battlestar Galactica. His character is a Tauron enforcer for the Ha'la'tha crime syndicate on Caprica who frequently goes head-to-head with his lawyer brother Joseph Adama (played by Esai Morales), and is also the uncle of William Adama. On April 28, 2009, his role was expanded to series regular. Roiz stated in an interview that it was later revealed to him that his character would be gay, something he felt was an opportunity to explore the complexity of a gay character in a science fiction setting, as well as to explore the issue of homosexuality on a social level. In 2012, he guest-starred in the second season of the Jane Espenson–scripted romantic comedy web series Husbands.

From 2011 to 2017, Roiz was a series regular on Grimm, a supernatural/fantasy police procedural drama produced by Universal Television for NBC, staying on the regular cast for all 6 seasons of the show.

Roiz then went on to appear in Taken, Lucifer, Nice Iranian Girl, The Detectives, The Ballad of John St. George, The Order, Perfidy and FBI: International as well as having recurring roles on Salvation, Suits, Departure, 9-1-1, The Endgame and Chicago Med.

Additionally, he voice-acted for Superman: Red Son in 2020 and Turning Red in 2022.

== Filmography ==
=== Film ===
Year	Title	Role	Notes
2004	The Day After Tomorrow	Parker	
2005	Assault on Precinct 13	Jason Elias	
2005	Land of the Dead	Manolete	
2006	16 Blocks	Detective Kaller	
2006	Man of the Year	Donald Tilson	
2010	Unthinkable	Master Sergeant Lubitchich	
2012	Extracted	Tom	
2014	Pompeii	Marcus Proculus	
2020	Superman: Red Son	Hal Jordan / Green Lantern (voice)	
2022	Turning Red	Mr. Kielowski (voice)	

=== Television ===
Year	Title	Role	Notes
2001	Largo Winch	Sergei	Episode: "Endgame"
2003	Playmakers	Stephen Lyles	6 episodes
2003	Mutant X	Nathaniel	Episode: "Wasteland"
2004	Missing	Randall Markham	Episode: "In the Midnight Hour"
2004	Kevin Hill	Nick Bratt	Episode: "Gods and Monsters"
2005	Tilt	Blake	2 episodes
2005	Show Me Yours	Chazz Banks	8 episodes
2005	Beautiful People	Mr. Tabor	4 episodes
2006	G-spot	Jackson	2 episodes
2006	The Jane Show	Ted	2 episodes
2006	The Path to 9/11	Nick DeMoia	TV mini-series
2007	Jeff Ltd.	Taylor Bloom	4 episodes
2007	NCIS	NCIS Agent Rick Hall	Episode: "Grace Period"
2007	CSI: Miami	Darren Butler	Episode: "Guerillas in the Mist"
2007	Across the River to Motor City	Ben Ford	Series regular
2008	Terminator: The Sarah Connor Chronicles	Police Officer	Episode: "Gnothi Seauton"
2008	Victor	Alex Baumann	TV movie about late Canadian swimmer Victor Davis
2009	Lie To Me	Captain David Markov	Episode: "A Perfect Score"
2009	The Mentalist	Keith Wolcott	Episode: "Crimson Casanova"
2010	In Plain Sight	Anton Ivanov	Episode: "Love's Faber Lost"
2010	CSI: Crime Scene Investigation	Danny Macklin	Episode: "Pool Shark"
2010	Caprica	Sam Adama	Series regular
2011	House	Driscoll	Episode: "Carrot or Stick"
2011	Castle	Bobby Stark	Episode: "Pretty Dead"
2011	Warehouse 13	Marcus Diamond	7 episodes
2011	It's Always Sunny in Philadelphia	Adriano Calvanese	2 episodes
2011–2017	Grimm	Captain Sean Renard	Series regular
2012	Husbands	Photog	Episode: "Appropriate Is Not the Word"
2017–2018	Salvation	President Monroe Bennett	
2018	Taken	Maximilian Silver	Episode: "All About Eve"
2019	Lucifer	U.S. Marshal Luke Reynolds	Episode: "Everything's Okay"
2019	Suits	Thomas Kessler	6 episodes
2019	Departure	Pavel Bartok	Recurring role (season 1); 5 episodes
2020	The Order	Rogwan	Episode: "Fear Itself, Part 2"
2020–2021	9-1-1	Detective Lou Ransone	Recurring role (seasons 3–5)
2022	The Endgame	President Andrew Wright	3 episodes
2022	FBI: International	Lt. Timur Rusu	Episode: "Chew Toy"
2022–2023	Chicago Med	Jack Dayton	Recurring role (season 8); 13 episodes
2025	Tracker	Commissioner Ross Bogart	2 Episodes (season 3)

=== Video games ===
Year	Title	Role	Notes
2009	The Godfather II	Don Esteban Almeida	Voice
2009	Wolfenstein	Pavel Cherny / Black Market Agent	Voice
