= The Little Vampire =

The Little Vampire may refer to:

- The Little Vampire (book series)
- The Little Vampire (film)
- The Little Vampire (TV series)
- The Little Vampire 3D, 2017 animated film
- Little Vampire, 2020 animated film
