= List of vampire television series =

List of television series about vampires, creatures from folklore that subsist by feeding on the vital essence (generally in the form of blood) of the living. In European folklore, vampires are undead creatures that often visited loved ones and caused mischief or deaths in the neighbourhoods they inhabited while they were alive.

== Vampire television series ==
=== Live Action ===
Title	Year	Country	Original language(s)	Seasons	Episodes	Notes	References
A Discovery of Witches	2018–2022	UK	English	3	25	based on the All Souls Trilogy books by Deborah Harkness.	
Coven Academy	2026–	US	English	1	10		
City of Blood	2026–	Germany	German	1	8		
Gabriel, Amor Inmortal	2008-2009	US	Spanish	1	11	Chayanne stars this series as a vampire.	
Age of the Living Dead	2018	US	English	1	6		
The Vampires of Middle Lane	2021–2022	Russia	Russian	2	17		
Heartbeat	2023	South Korea	Korean	1	16		
Angel	1999–2004	US	English	5	110	spin-off of the television series Buffy the Vampire Slayer	
Becoming Human	2011	UK	English	1	8	Being Human spinoff	
Being Human	2008–2013	UK	English	5	37		
Being Human	2011–2014	US/Canada	English	4	52	remake of the British television series	
Blade: The Series	2006	US	English	1	13	based on the Marvel Comics character and film series	
Blood	2015	South Korea	Korean	1	20		
Blood Ties	2007	Canada	English	2	22		
Blue Veins	2016	Hong Kong	Cantonese	1	33		
Buffy the Vampire Slayer	1997–2003	US	English	7	144		
Chapelwaite	2021	US	English	1	10	based on the short story "Jerusalem's Lot" by Stephen King	
Cliffhangers	1979	US	English	1	10	Ongoing segment The Curse of Dracula, in which Dracula lives in 1979 San Francisco as a college teacher.	
Count Abdulla	2023	UK	English	1	6	Sitcom about a British-Pakistani Muslim doctor vampire.	
Dark Shadows	1966–1971	US	English	6	1,225	Gothic soap opera	
Dark Shadows	1991	US	English	1	12	short-lived remake of Dark Shadows (1966-1971)	
Death Valley	2011	US	English	1	12		
Demons	2009	UK	English	1	6	characters Mina and Quincey Harker revealed to be vampires	
Der kleine Vampir – Neue Abenteuer	1993	Germany	German	1	13	German sequel series to The Little Vampire	
Destino Imortal	2010	Portugal	Portuguese	1	6		
Dracula	2002	Italy/Germany	English	1	2		
Dracula	2013–2014	UK/US	English	1	10		
Dracula	2020	UK	English	1	3	loosely based on Dracula by Bram Stoker	
Dracula: The Series	1990–1991	Canada/US	English	1	21		
Draculas ring	1978	Denmark	Danish	1	7		
First Kill	2022	US	English	1	8	based on the short story, of the same name, in Vampires Never Get Old: Tales With Fresh Bite	
Forever Knight	1992–1996	Canada	English	3	70	see also Nick Knight (1989) (pilot episode)	
Freeze	2006	South Korea	Korean	1	5		
Firebite	2021-2022	Australia	English	1	8		
From Dusk Till Dawn: The Series	2014–2016	US	English	3+	30+	based on the film series From Dusk Till Dawn	
The Gates	2010	US	English	1	13		
Heirs of the Night	2019–2020	Netherlands/Germany/Norway	English	2	26	based on the book series Die Erben der Nacht by Ulrike Schweikert	
Hello Franceska	2005–2006	South Korea	Korean	3	52		
Hemlock Grove	2013–2015	US	English	3	33	characters Roman and Olivia Godfrey	
Higanjima	2013	Japan	Japanese	1	10		
I Heart Vampires	2009–2010	US	English	2	61		
Imortal	2010	Philippines	Filipino	2	148	sequel to Lobo	
Interview with the Vampire	2022-	US	English	3	22	based on Interview with the Vampire by Anne Rice from her series The Vampire Chronicles	
I Woke Up a Vampire	2023-present	Canada	English	1	16		
Juda	2017-	Israel	Hebrew	2	8+		
Kindred the Embraced	1996	US	English	1	8	based on the role-playing game Vampire: The Masquerade	
Kamen Rider Kiva	2008	Japan	Japanese	1	47		
The Lair	2007–2009	US	English	3	28		
La Luna Sangre	2017-	Philippines	Filipino			sequel to Lobo	
Let the Right One In	2022	US	English			based on the novel of the same name	
The Little Vampire	1985	Canada/Germany	English	1	13	based on the books by Angela Sommer-Bodenburg	
Legacies	2018-2022	US	English			spin-off of The Vampire Diaries and The Originals	
Love Sucks	2024	Germany	German	1	8		
Lua Vermelha	2010	Portugal	Portuguese	1	225		
Mad Mad House	2004	US	English	1	10		
Midnight Mass	2021	US	English	1	7		
Moonlight	2007–2008	US	English	1	16	vampire detective series	
MTV Fanaah	2014–2015	India	Hindi	2	73		
The Munsters	1964–1966	US	English	2	70	American sitcom	
The Munsters Today	1988–1991	US	English	3	72	sequel to The Munsters	
The Mutants: Pathways of the Heart	2008-2009	Brazil	Portuguese	1	243		
My Babysitter's a Vampire	2011–2012	Canada	English	2	26		
My Date with a Vampire	1998–1999	Hong Kong	Cantonese	1	35		
My Date with a Vampire II	2000	Hong Kong	Cantonese	1	43		
My Date with a Vampire III	2004	Hong Kong	Cantonese	1	38		
O Beijo do Vampiro	2002–2003	Brazil	Portuguese	1	215		
Orange Marmalade	2015	South Korea	Korean	1	12		
The Originals	2013–2018	US	English	5	92	spinoff of The Vampire Diaries	
The Passage	2019-2019	US	English			based on The Passage series of novels	
Penny Dreadful	2014-2016	US/UK	English	3	27		
Ponti Anak Remaja (Ponti the Teenage Vampire)	2010	Malaysia	Malay				
Port Charles	1997-2003	US	English	6	1,633	utilized vampires in story arcs from 2001 to 2003	
Preacher	2016–2019	US	English	4	43		
Pyaar Kii Ye Ek Kahaani (This is a story of love)	2010–2011	India	Hindi	1	331		
Reginald the Vampire	2022—	US	English	2+	11		
Salem's Lot	1979	US	English	1	2	miniseries based on the novel of the same name	
Salem's Lot	2004	US	English	1	2	remake of the 1979 miniseries based on the novel of the same name	
Split	2009–2012	Israel	Hebrew	3	135		
Split	2011	Ukraine	Russian	1	40	remake of the Israeli TV series	
Still Have Time to Love You	2013	Hong Kong	Cantonese	1	9		
Supernatural	2005-2020	US	English	15	327		
The Dresden Files	2007	US	English	1	12	Supernatural film noir about a private detective who is also a wizard.	
The Scholar Who Walks the Night	2015	South Korea	Korean	1	20		
The Strain	2014–2017	US	English	4	46	based on Guillermo del Toro's novel trilogy of the same name	
True Blood	2008–2014	US	English	7	80	based on The Southern Vampire Mysteries series of novels by Charlaine Harris	
Ultraviolet	1998	UK	English	1	6		
V Wars	2019	US	English	1	10	Netflix production based on a comic book series	
Vampire Academy	2022	US	English	1	10	based on the novels series of the same name by Richelle Mead	
Vampire ang Daddy Ko	2013-2016	Philippines	Filipino	2	169		
The Vampire Detective	2016	South Korea	Korean	1	12	Vampire Prosecutor spinoff	
The Vampire Diaries	2009–2017	US	English	8	171	based on the book series of the same name by L. J. Smith	
Vampire Heaven	2013	Japan	Japanese	1	12		
Vampire High	2001–2002	Canada	English	1	26		
Vampire Host	2004	Japan	Japanese	1	12		
Vampire Idol	2011–2012	South Korea	Korean	1	79		
Vampire Prosecutor	2011	South Korea	Korean	2	23	vampire detective series	
Vampires	2020	France	French	1	6	A Netflix production based on a book	
Vampirina: Teenage Vampire	2025–2026	United States	English	2	22	A Disney Channel production based on a book as well on the Vampirina animated series	
The Vampyr: A Soap Opera	1991–1992	UK	English	1	2	based on Heinrich Marschner's opera Der Vampyr	
Vamp	1991–1992	Brazil	Portuguese	1	179		
Van Helsing	2016–2021	US	English	5	65		
Young Dracula	2006–2008–2011–2014	UK	English	5	66	CBBC children/youth series	
What We Do in the Shadows	2019–2024	US	English	2+	30+	based on the 2014 film What We Do In the Shadows	
Eternally Yours	2026–	US	English	1		CBS vampire family comedy series	

=== Animated ===
Title	Year	Country	Original language(s)	Seasons	Episodes	Notes	References
Adventure Time	2010-18	US	English	10	283		
Black Blood Brothers	2006	Japan	Japanese	1	12		
Blood+ (Blood Plus)	2005–2006	Japan	Japanese	4	50	an alternate version of Blood: The Last Vampire	
Blood Lad	2013	Japan	Japanese	1	10		
Bunnicula	2016–2018	US	English	3	104	loosely based on the three animal characters presented in the original book Bunnicula: A Rabbit-Tale of Mystery by James and Deborah Howe	
Call of the Night	2022- 2025	Japan	Japanese	2	25	based on the manga of the same name	
Castlevania	2017–2021	US	English	3	22	based on the video game series of the same name	
Karin	2005–2006	Japan	Japanese	1	24		
Count Duckula (parody of Dracula)	1988–1993	UK	English	4	65	a spinoff; the titular character originated from the 1981 series Danger Mouse	
Dance in the Vampire Bund	2010	Japan	Japanese	1	12		
Diabolik Lovers	2013–2015	Japan	Japanese	2	24		
Fortune Arterial: Akai Yakusoku	2010	Japan	Japanese	1	12		
Groovie Goolies	1970-1971	US	English	1	16	rerun and repackaged throughout the 1970s.	
The Haunted House	2016-present	South Korea	Korean	5	123		
Hellsing	2001–2002	Japan	Japanese	2	20		
Hellsing Ultimate	2006–2012	Japan	Japanese	1	10		
Irina: The Vampire Cosmonaut	2021	Japan	Japanese	1	13	based on the light novel series of the same name written by Keisuke Makino.	
JoJo's Bizarre Adventure (OVA)	1993-2002	Japan	Japanese	2	13	based on Stardust Crusaders, the third part of the shonen/seinen manga series, JoJo's Bizarre Adventure written by Hirohiko Araki.	
JoJo's Bizarre Adventure (TV series)	2012-	Japan	Japanese	5	153	based on the manga series of the same name written by Hirohiko Araki.	
Little Dracula	1991	US	English	2	26		
Mona the Vampire	1999–2006	Canada	English	4	65	Canadian television show based on the short stories	
Monster Force	1994	US/Canada	English	1	13	featuring Dracula as the mastermind of evil, the Prince of Darkness and the main antagonist of the series	
Ms. Vampire Who Lives in My Neighborhood	2018	Japan	Japanese	1	12	based on the manga series of the same name	
Nightwalker: The Midnight Detective	1998	Japan	Japanese	1	12		
Nyanpire: The Animation	2011	Japan	Japanese	1	12		
Quacula (parody of Dracula)	1979	US	English	1	16	originally aired as a segment of The New Adventures of Mighty Mouse and Heckle & Jeckle created by Filmation, not to be confused with Count Duckula	
Rosario + Vampire	2008	Japan	Japanese	2	26		
School for Vampires	2006–2010	Germany/Italy	German	4	104	based on the book of the same name	
Seraph of the End	2015	Japan	Japanese	2	24		
Shiki	2010	Japan	Japanese	1	22	based on the novel and manga of the same name	
Trinity Blood	2005	Japan	Japanese	1	24		
Vampire Knight	2008	Japan	Japanese	2	26		
Vampire Princess Miyu	1997–1998	Japan	Japanese	1	26		
Vampirina	2017–2021	US/Ireland	English	3	75	based on a series of children's books adapted for Disney Junior	

== Vampire web series ==
Title	Year	Country	Original language(s)	Seasons	Episodes	Notes	References
The Hunted	2001–present	US	English				
30 Days of Night: Blood Trails	2007	US	English	1	7	prequel to the films 30 Days of Night and 30 Days of Night: Dark Days	
30 Days of Night: Dust to Dust	2008	US	English	1	6	sequel to the 2007 movie 30 Days of Night	
I Heart Vampires	2009–2010	US	English	2	61		
Valemont	2009	US	English	1	5	MTV miniseries	
I Kissed a Vampire	2009	US	English	1	3		
Becoming Human	2011	UK	English	1	8	Being Human spin-off	
Carmilla	2014-2016	Canada	English	3	102	based on the novella of the same name	
Immortals	2018	Turkey	Turkish	1	8		
Nila Nila Odi Vaa	2018	India	Tamil	1	13	starring Ashwin Kakumanu, Sunaina	
Hunter: the Parenting	2021-present		English	2	4	A World of Darkness spinoff	
Strawberry Vampire	TBA		English				

== See also ==
- Vampire film
- List of vampire films
- Vampire literature
- List of fictional vampires
