= Der kleine Vampir – Neue Abenteuer =

- Written by: Sabine Thiesler; Angela Sommer-Bodenburg
- Directed by: Christian Görlitz
- Composer: Achim Hagemann
- Country of origin: Germany
- Original language: German
- No. of seasons: 1
- No. of episodes: 13

Production
- Running time: 30 min.

Original release
- Release: December 5, 1993 – 1994

Related
- The Little Vampire (1986)

Der kleine Vampir – Neue Abenteuer is a German children's television series made in 1993. The series counts 13 episodes and is based upon the books The Little Vampire Takes a Trip and The Little Vampire on the Farm, which are part of the Der kleine Vampir series written by German author Angela Sommer-Bodenburg.

The series had previously been the basis for the 1986 series Der kleine Vampir, which was based upon other books in the series. Different actors were used for the 1993 series because the original actors had grown too old for the roles by that point. The 1993 series is neither a successor concerning the story. The 1993 series also introduces the characters of the parents of Anna and Rudiger. Uncle Theodor, who was a main character in the 1986 series, does not appear in the 1993 series because he is dead (which is in line with the books).

== Synopsis ==
Anton Bohnsack, a 10-year-old boy, is befriended with Rüdiger von Schlotterstein and his sister Anna. Rüdiger and Anna seem to be unusual individuals as they wear odd clothes, but in reality, Rüdiger and Anna are vampires living with their family in a secret crypt at the old part of the local cemetery. Anton experiences many adventures with the vampires which he also tells to his parents. They do not believe him as Anton has a fascination with horror stories. Anna and Rüdiger can fly by using their vampire cloaks. They gave Anton the vampire cloak of their uncle Theodor who was once killed by vampire hunters. Furthermore, Anna is in love with Anton.

Anton is cheered with the upcoming holidays, but his parents decided to spend their vacation at a farm in Ottenbüttel. Anton asks Rüdiger to join, but he refuses as he is not confident with a (temporarily) live at a farm. Due to an incident between Rüdiger and his cousin Jörg, Rüdiger is forced to hide so he and Anna do travel to the farm.

Rüdiger is almost trapped by the farmer. Doctor Heinrich Stöbermann reveals to be a vampire hunter and a good friend of Johann Geiermeier. Geiermeier, also a vampire hunter, is the handyman and gravedigger of the cemetery where Rüdiger and his family reside. Heinrich suspects there are vampires around the farm and asks Geiermeier to come over. Geiermeier ends up in a vampire trap set up by Stöbermann. Next day, a furious Geiermeier leaves the farm and does not want to see Stöbermann anymore.

Anton, who learned to ride the horses, wins a horseman tournament. He, Rüdiger and Anna also go to the "International Vampire Party". Anton is surprised to meet his parents at the party.

== Episodes ==
1. Schreck in der Abendstunde (Fear in the night)

Anton is home alone: his parents Helga and Robert are in the theatre. Anton decides to give his friend Rüdiger a visit in his crypt where they play "vampire and hunter". Anton's parents are home early and inform the police as their son is not in. Meanwhile, Rüdiger's other family members are heading towards the crypt, but they are stopped by gravedigger Johan Geiermeier, also a vampire hunter. The family soon escapes. When Anton enters his house, he needs to clarify where he was. Although he tells the truth, his parents do not believe him and is grounded for a week. His parents also tell him that they are going on vacation in Ottenbüttel where they'll reside at a farm.

2. Anna in Not (Anna in trouble)

Anna plays at the edge of the cemetery and is caught by Geiermeier. He takes her to his house. Her mother, Hildegard die Durstige (Hildegard the Thirsty) is a witness and sneakily enters Geiermeier's house. She hears how Geiermeier tries to confess Anna that she is a vampire. A crying Hildegard seeks to the crypt for help. Rüdiger has a plan: Anna must convince Geiermeier she is human and flies to Anton. Also Anna has a plan: she tries to convince Geiermeier to be a sister of Anton and to call him. Rüdiger arrives at Anton's place, but he can't help as he is grounded, and they both switch places. Anton tells his parents he is going to sleep, but is actually Rüdiger who goes to the bedroom. Anton runs to Geiermeier. To prove he is human, Anton eats some garlic. This satisfies Geiermeier and he releases Anna. Back home, Anton asks Rüdiger to join him on his vacation, but Rüdiger refuses.

3. Überraschung in der Nacht (Surprise during the night)

Anton's parents have to go to a dinner and ask their neighbor miss Puvogel, addicted to television, to be the nanny. Anton tells miss Puvogel that he is tired and goes to bed. He sneaks away and visits the fair together with Rüdiger. They enter a haunted house where Rüdiger smashes one of the dolls with a stick. It turns out not to be a doll, but a cousin of Rüdiger: Jörg der Aufbrausende (Jörg the irascible). He hid in the haunted house to get "a snack". Jörg chases after Rüdiger and swears to break all his bones. Geiermeier, also at the fair, spots the vampires. That's why Jörg abates the chasing temporarily. Rüdiger decides to join Anton to the farm as Jörg will not search him over there.

4. Geiermeiers Verdacht (Geiermeier's suspicion)

Anna lent her friendship book to Anton so he will be the first human who'll write something in the book. The book ends up in hands of Geiermeier who now thinks Anton and his parents are vampires. Next morning, Geiermeier sneaks into the bedroom of Anton's parents and is about to stick them. Anton can prevent this by opening the curtains so he can prove he and his parents can stand the sunlight. Due to Anton's fascination of horror, Geiermeier concludes the book contains stories made up by Anton and overhands to book. Anton returns it to Anna. Due to the nightly escapades Anton's school results are decreasing, and his school teacher, Miss Schlauberger, wants a meeting with his parents.

5. Der Sarg muss mit (The coffin must come over)

Soon, Anton departs with his parents to the farm. Rüdiger wants to join to stay out of Jörg sight. This however presents major problem, about how must a vampire travel. His coffin is wrapped with paper and Rüdiger dresses up as a human. They leave the crypt to head to the railway station. At the cemetery they meet Geiermeier. He considered Anton and Anna to be vampires, but after latest incidents he believes they are human. Due to the disguise, Geiermeier thinks Rüdiger is from Tyrol. The children conceive Geiermeier by telling him the package contains 7000 garlic stringent. He helps them by carrying the package. Just before the train leaves, Geiermeier figures out Rüdiger and Anna are vampires. He chases after Anna, but she can escape. Jörg is in the Schlottersteins crypt in search for Rüdiger.

6. Nächtliche Bahnfahrt (Nightly railway journey)

During the railway journey to Ottenbüttel, Anton and Rüdiger play Mensch ärgere dich nicht. When an old lady enters the compartment, an issue turns up: Rüdiger did not eat and now wants the lady as meal. He flies upon her, but she runs away and pulls the emergency brake. Anton explains the situation to the ticket-collector in order to calm her. Soon Rüdiger goes to the old lady and tells her he is a real vampire. The old lady faints. As this is the second time the boys made uproar, they are banished from the train and must continue their trip by foot.

7. Angst um Rüdiger (Panic regarding Rüdiger)

Anton and Rüdiger arrive at the farm. Anton starts his search for Rüdiger's coffin and a place where the vampire can sleep. Last one becomes an old windmill. He also meets Hermann and Johanna Hering, the farmer's children. Aunt Dorothee, still in the crypt, realizes there are many vampire hunters at the countryside and decides to travel to Ottenbüttel. The farmer's woman discovers the chicken are not in their run anymore. She also finds a weird cloak. She calls doctor Stöbermann for an investigation: he is certain that this is the work of vampires.

8. Glück im Unglück (Every cloud has a silver lining)

Anton is ill and his mother calls doctor Stöbermann, who is revealed to be a vampire hunter. Farmer Hering now uses Rüdigers cloak as a scarecrow. Anna, who had to escape for Geiermeier before, travels to Ottenbüttel by foot. She sees the cloak in a grassland and thinks her brother is dead. At this time, Stöbermann passes with his Dalmatian Brutus. He is in search for vampires and finds a crying Anna. She tells Stöberman that she tries to find her friend Anton. Stöberman takes Anna to the farm. Not much later, Stöbermann, Anna and Anton see how Rüdiger must climb into a tree for Brutus. Anna and Anton convince Stöbermann that Brutus did not attack Rüdiger as he would be a vampire, but the dog was scared for some other reason.

9. Vom Teufel geritten (Speak of the Devil)

The countryside now appeals to Rüdiger. He, Anna and Anton find some horses and are riding them each night. Some days later, farmer Hering calls Stöbermann to check up the horses as they are tired for unknown reasons. Stöbermann thinks to have a suspect and this is confirmed when he sees a flying Anna. Next, Stöbermann calls his friend Geiermeier. Both vampire hunters set up a trap. Geiermeier ends up in a vampire trap set up by Stöbermann. Next day, a furious Geiermeier leaves and discontinues his friendship with Stöbermann. Anton wins the horsemen tournament.

10. Der unheimliche Organist (The fearful organ player)

It is Anna's birthday and she invites Anton for a party in the church. There, they are surprised by Stöberman who catches Anton, while Anna escapes. Anton persuades Stöbermann that he is hiding for a dark vampire and is now scared to go to the farm alone. Stöbermann takes Anton to the farm and interrogates him about the vampire's presence. Meanwhile, aunt Dorothee arrives in Ottenbüttel and hides in same windmill. Some days later, it turns out the vampire described by Anton does exist. It seems to be Ludwig der Fürchterliche, the father of Anna and Rüdiger, also hiding in the windmill. Ludwig and Anna go to the church where he plays the organ for her. Stöbermann discovers this event and asks Anton to become his assistance as a vampire hunter. After sunset, farmer Hering invites Stöbermann, Helga and Robert for a drink. Helga sees a big bat in the sky, but soon realizes this might be a vampire.

11. Die Gruselshow (The eerie show).

Anton discovers Stöbermann made some vampire traps disguised as coffins. He alerts the vampires. Meanwhile, The Peanuts, an American family travelling in Germany, made attention of the windmill and want to buy it. Lumpi, the elder brother of Anna and Rüdiger, also arrived. He has an idea: they will surprise the Peanuts with an eerie show, but the Peanuts think the show is a genius act. Now, they are willing to buy the windmill and to give the "actors" a contact to perform their show in America. Their opinion changes after mister Peanuts lies down in a coffin which is actually a vampire trap made by Stöbermann. Due to this incident, the Peanuts are not willing to buy the windmill anymore as it attracts vampires.

12. Der blutrote Rubin (The blood-red ruby)

Stöbermann is certain: vampires are hiding in the old windmill. Although Anton tries to stop Stöbermann, last one finds Rüdiger's coffin. After opening, it seems to be empty. The vampire family travelled back to their own crypt to pick up a blood-red ruby. It is a floating trophy which is to win during the International Vampire Party and was granted to the Schlottersteins 130 years earlier, but the blood-red ruby is missing. Rüdiger's great parents Sabine der Schrecklichen and Wilhelm dem Wüsten assume the ruby was stolen by vampire hunter Kuno Bösermann after he stabbed vampire Viktoria die Unglückliche. Dismayed they head back to the old windmill. When Anton hears about the missing ruby, he starts an investigation. It turns out Kuno's real last name is Stöbermann and the grandfather of doctor Stöbermann. Anton, Anna and Rüdiger sneak into his house and find the ruby.

13. Das Vampirfest (The vampire party)

The International Vampire Party takes place in an abandoned factory not so far from the windmill. Anton, dressed up as a vampire, joins with Rüdiger and Anna. He is introduced as Uwe der Unerschrockene. Anton is wondered when he finds out his parents are also at the party, but they think to be supporting actors for a vampire movie. That's why Rüdiger introduces them as being members of the "Skorpio-clan", a fearful vampire clan. This will prevent them to stay unaffected. During the climax of the party, Anton gets the highest honor title and will be the new owner of the ruby. This presents a problem, as Anton and his parents must organize the next International Vampire Party which will only take place after 130 years. Anton makes up he just became a vampire and should not be considered to get the title already. Anton's mother leaves the party to get a breath of air. She is overpowered by Stöbermann who wants to destroy her. Luckily, Helga can remove her fake vampire teeth to show she is human. A disordered Stöbermann slinks of. Next day, the family Bohnsack travels back homewards and take Rüdiger's coffin with them. Helga and Robert think the coffin is a prop used to make the movie.

== See also ==
- The Little Vampire (1986)
- List of German television series
- List of vampire television series
