= Kiss of the Muse =

- Grimm episode
- Episode no.: Season 2 Episode 20
- Directed by: Tawnia McKiernan
- Written by: Sean Calder
- Cinematography by: Eliot Rockett
- Editing by: George Pilkinton
- Production code: 220
- Original air date: May 7, 2013
- Running time: 42 minutes

Guest appearances
- Nora Zehetner as Khloe Sedgwick; Brian Gant as Anton Cole

Episode chronology
← Previous "Endangered"	Next → "The Waking Dead"
- Grimm season 2

"Kiss of the Muse" is the 20th episode of season 2 of the supernatural drama television series Grimm and the 42nd episode overall, which premiered on May 7, 2013, on NBC. The episode was written by Sean Calder, and was directed by Tawnia McKiernan.

== Plot ==
Opening quote: "Tell me O'Muse, from whatsoever source you may know them."

Nick (David Giuntoli) meets with Hank (Russell Hornsby), who has returned from his vacation with his ex-wife. Hank has torn his Achilles tendon on a zip line. They hear gunshots across the street and Nick goes to investigate, finding an author dead and a man, Anton Cole (Brian Gant), shooting, trying to leave with a woman, Khloe Sedgwick (Nora Zehetner). Nick chases Anton but Anton jumps into a river, escaping.

Nick and the police question Khloe, who states that the author was her boyfriend and Anton is her ex. She then kisses Nick's hand in gratitude. Finding Anton's address, the police arrive and find he had an obsession with Khloe. Nick then gets a call from Juliette (Bitsie Tulloch), who is inviting him to dinner, which he accepts. Nick visits Khloe to check on her and she kisses him, revealing she is a Wesen named Musai.

When Nick arrives for dinner with Juliette, it does not go well as Nick keeps thinking and having hallucinations of Khloe, prompting him to leave before eating. He goes with Monroe (Silas Weir Mitchell), behaves out of character and then leaves to go to a bar. Monroe calls Hank to talk to Nick about it. Hank meets with Nick in the bar and finds Nick drawing an image of Khloe woged form. A person tries to take it, and Nick attacks him and leaves.

Monroe and Hank take Rosalee (Bree Turner) to the trailer in an attempt to find a cure for Nick. They find that the kiss of a Musai causes an addiction that could end with death. Past victims include Vincent van Gogh. The only cure may be true love. Anton makes a painting of Khloe in streets, dragging Nick's attention. Juliette arrives at the spice shop and meets Rosalee and Monroe, stating she now believes Nick's claims of the Wesen world and the Grimms and asks for explanations. Rosalee tells her that she may be the key to Nick's condition.

Nick goes to Khloe's house, where she manipulates him into trying to kill Anton, who is there, to prove his love for her. Nick attacks Anton until the police arrive but, as he continues punching him after the arrest, he is restrained by Renard (Sasha Roiz). In the station, Nick goes to Anton's cell to kill him but is stopped by Monroe, Renard and Juliette. Juliette manages to stop Khloe's influence and Nick hugs her. Renard visits Khloe in the interview room and tells her to leave Portland forever and threatens her with his Zauberbiest form to prove his point.

== Reception ==
=== Viewers ===
The episode was viewed by 5.67 million people, earning a 1.8/5 in the 18-49 rating demographics on the Nielson ratings scale, ranking first on its timeslot and sixth for the night in the 18-49 demographics, behind Hell's Kitchen, New Girl, NCIS: Los Angeles, NCIS, and The Voice. This was a 2% decrease in viewership from the previous episode, which was watched by 5.77 million viewers with a 1.9/5. This means that 1.8 percent of all households with televisions watched the episode, while 5 percent of all households watching television at that time watched it. With DVR factoring in, the episode was watched by 8.42 million viewers with a 2.9 ratings share in the 18-49 demographics.

=== Critical reviews ===
"Kiss of the Muse" received positive reviews. The A.V. Club's Kevin McFarland gave the episode an "A−" grade and wrote, "An episode like 'Kiss Of The Muse,' one of the best examples of the kind of compelling, consistent genre show Grimm can be at its best, always reminds me that it was the first overall pick in Grantland's cancellation draft. Almost nobody gave this show a real chance, and yet, with modest success compared to the rest of the NBC lineup, it earned enough survival time to work out its problems and develop a solid group of characters. Now, here it is, stringing together a streak of strong episodes, on the verge of falling right in line behind David Greenwalt's previous successes on Angel. It's a familiar formula, but that doesn't diminish how damn entertaining this show can be when it all comes together in the right way."

Nick McHatton from TV Fanatic, gave a 3.7 star rating out of 5, stating: "Well, that was underwhelming. I'm not sure what I was expecting, but something that low key to drag Nick out of his kiss of the crazy certainly wasn't it."

Shilo Adams from TV Overmind, wrote: "Khloe looked like a close-enough-approximation-but-not-carbon-copy-of the creatures from Avatar, right? I like having her be such a different looking Wesen, but the resemblance was uncanny."
