= Alphas =

American science fiction dramatic television series (2011–2012)

- Also known as: Section 8
- Genre: Superhero; Drama
- Created by: Zak Penn; Michael Karnow
- Starring: David Strathairn; Ryan Cartwright; Warren Christie; Azita Ghanizada; Laura Mennell; Malik Yoba; Erin Way
- Narrated by: David Strathairn
- Theme music composer: Luke Adams, Erik Kertes
- Composers: Trevor Morris, Edward Rogers
- Country of origin: United States
- Original language: English
- No. of seasons: 2
- No. of episodes: 24

Production
- Executive producers: Bruce Miller; Ira Steven Behr; Zak Penn; Gail Berman; Lloyd Braun; Gene Stein; Robert Hewitt Wolfe
- Producers: Michael Karnow; Nick Copus; Julie Siege; Kevin Lafferty
- Camera setup: Single-camera
- Running time: 43 minutes
- Production companies: BermanBraun; Universal Cable Productions

Original release
- Network: Syfy
- Release: July 11, 2011 – October 22, 2012

Related
- Warehouse 13

Alphas is an American superhero drama television series created by Zak Penn and Michael Karnow. It follows a group of people with superhuman abilities, known as "Alphas", as they work to prevent crimes committed by other Alphas.

The series was broadcast in the United States on the cable channel Syfy and was a co-production between BermanBraun and Universal Cable Productions. It premiered on July 11, 2011. After initial reports that the show was canceled, on September 7, 2011, Alphas was renewed for a 13-episode second season, which premiered on Monday, July 23, 2012, at 10 p.m. ET. On January 16, 2013, Syfy announced that the program would not be returning for a third season, ending the series with an unresolved cliffhanger.

== Plot ==
The series follows five people, known as "Alphas", led by noted neurologist and psychiatrist Lee Rosen (David Strathairn), as they investigate criminal cases involving other suspected Alphas.

Rosen and his team operate under the auspices of the Defense Criminal Investigative Service, the criminal investigative arm of the U.S. Department of Defense. While investigating these crimes, it does not take the team too long to discover that a group known as "Red Flag", which was thought defeated and eliminated long ago, is using other Alphas to commit crimes.

== Cast ==
Promotional poster showing the six main characters

- David Strathairn as Dr. Lee Rosen – A specialist in the study of people with super abilities, whom he has dubbed "Alphas". He leads a government-sponsored team of Alphas that identifies others of their kind—helping those in need and stopping those that are dangerous. Rosen himself has no super abilities, but is good at understanding and dealing with people. He swims two miles per day in his pool and grows his own herbs.
- Ryan Cartwright as Gary Bell – A young, autistic man who is socially lacking but very functional. A prodigious savant, his ability is transduction: he sees electromagnetic radiation of all wavelengths and can process information as fast as any computer. In season two, he develops the ability to find the wavelengths of forks, trees and other non-electrical items when faced with no technology.
- Warren Christie as Cameron Hicks – A former Marine with "hyperkinesis", meaning his brain can process movement at a much faster rate than normal. He can achieve amazing athletic feats of timing, and has superhuman reflexes and perfect accuracy with firearms or thrown objects: he can accurately predict trajectory by eyesight alone. His abilities are vulnerable to duress. In the first episode he is found to have an abnormal growth in his brain. He is approached by the team in a supermarket after they find video of him as a child pitching a perfect baseball game. He has one child who is rarely in his life. In season one, he has a relationship with Nina. In season two, he develops a relationship with Dr. Rosen's daughter, Dani. He becomes obsessed with the idea that his son has an Alpha ability, and constantly puts him in situations to test for such an ability.
- Azita Ghanizada as Rachel Pirzad – A former CIA linguist with the ability to "heighten" any of her five senses (sight, smell, taste, hearing, touch) to extreme levels by disabling the others. She can, for instance, view things at a microscopic level or analyse chemical composition by scent. The permanent heightening of her senses, along with her synesthesia, makes it hard for her to interact socially, and she has difficulty maintaining relationships with the opposite sex. In season two, she learns how to further control her senses.
- Laura Mennell as Nina Theroux – A young woman who can mentally "push" people into doing whatever she verbally asks of them. Her diagnosis is "hyperinduction". Before joining the team, she used her power for personal gain. Consequently, she believes she (unintentionally) pushed her boyfriend and father into committing suicide. She hopes to redeem herself by helping Dr. Rosen. Her character seems to have been with Rosen the longest. A running gag in the first season is that she always has a different car that she has apparently "borrowed" by pushing someone. Pushing too hard or much on a person can cause brain death. Nina has good control of her ability; people with her ability have difficulty controlling how they use it, and can become power-hungry. FBI agents who interview her refuse to make eye contact, or insist on wearing dark sunglasses, in fear of being pushed. During Season 1, Gary mentions that her ability to push does not work on him. Her memory of her past is haunted by her pushing. Her father committed suicide after being pushed one too many times to not want to leave his wife when Nina was a child. In an episode in season two, Nina succumbs to her power-hunger, and later tries to make up for her mistakes. She is shown to be reluctant to use her ability.
- Malik Yoba as Bill Harken – A former FBI agent who can activate his endocrinal fight or flight response at will, resulting in increased durability, endurance, speed and strength. His diagnosis is enhanced strength from flight-or-fight response. He cannot keep this up for long due to the stress caused to his body. He was suspended from the FBI due to anger issues resulting from the stress of using his ability. Initially, he is rude and pushy with his teammates, especially Rachel and Gary. As season one progresses his relationship with the team improves and he is no longer known as "mean Bill".
- Erin Way as Kat (Season 2) – A mysterious, free-spirited young loner whose enhanced procedural memory allows her to pick up any skill at a glance, but at the cost of her long-term declarative memories. Due to the information she constantly processes, she forgets whatever information she has learned after one month, although she retains the skills she has acquired. Dr. Rosen gives her a video camera to help her remember. She struggles in particular with a memory involving a lady in a blue dress.

== Production ==
=== Development ===
Originally known as Section 8, Alphas was initially developed by Zak Penn and co-creator Michael Karnow in 2006. The series was then shopped around to various networks, with some interest from both NBC and ABC. In late 2007, ABC picked up the series with an initial six episode order. However, complications arising from the 2007–2008 Writers Guild of America strike derailed the project. On August 5, 2009, after almost two further years of shopping the show around to the broadcast and cable networks, Syfy placed a pilot order. Zak Penn and Michael Karnow wrote the pilot. Jack Bender was attached to the project as the director, with Gail Berman and Lloyd Braun serving as executive producers.

Casting began in August 2010. Filming of the pilot was done in Toronto, Canada.

Alphas was ordered to series on December 8, 2010, by Syfy to air in the summer of 2011. The series is a co-production between BermanBraun and Universal Cable Productions. Along with the series pickup, Syfy also announced that veteran Sci-Fi producer Ira Steven Behr had been picked to serve as executive producer and showrunner.

== Episodes ==
Season	Episodes	Originally released	
Season	Episodes	First released	Last released
1	11	July 11, 2011	September 26, 2011
2	13	July 23, 2012	October 22, 2012

=== Season 1 (2011) ===
No. overall	No. in season	Title	Directed by	Written by	Original release date	US viewers (millions)
1	1	"Pilot"	Jack Bender	Zak Penn & Michael Karnow	July 11, 2011	2.52
A team of people who exhibit special abilities (known as Alphas), who belong to a secret department attached to the CIA, are sent to investigate an impossible murder of a CIA Witness who was shot through the head in a sealed jail cell. They soon uncover the shooter, who is also an Alpha, and realize he is being controlled by yet another Alpha working for a rogue outfit. They break his conditioning, and he joins the team and helps to eradicate the mind controller.
2	2	"Cause & Effect"	Constantine Makris	Julie Siege	July 18, 2011	2.23
After the attack on Dr. Rosen, the team is forced to relocate their base of operations while trying to adapt to changes in their personal lives. Rosen tries to cope with his Department of Defense liaison and a former Alpha patient who escapes from the Binghamton Mental Hospital and wants him dead. The FBI attempts to rein in this patient, but as the body count climbs, it is decided that he will be killed instead. Just before this happens, he warns Dr. Rosen of a coming war between normal people and Alphas.
3	3	"Anger Management"	Nick Copus	Ira Steven Behr & Robert Hewitt Wolfe	July 25, 2011	1.95
A runaway teenage Alpha, Matthew, sets off riots up and down the East Coast, the team struggles to stop him and send him to the Binghamton Mental Hospital for treatment. When they find that they have this man inside their base, Matthew sends off the pheromones and this causes Rachel, who was on the phone with her mother, to shout at her mother, that she hated her and was moving out. Bill is not affected by his pheromones but the others are causing chaos that leads to Don's death. Later in the episode, Nina offers Rachel her home to stay in for a while, and this strengthens the friendship of the two. In a subplot, Gary finds it hard to concentrate on his abilities when a satellite antenna across the street starts humming, and at the end of the episode, Gary complains that no one has helped him, and then Cameron, using his "hyperkinesis" throws a baseball and disables the antenna, which strengthens his companionship with Gary. Agent Sullivan takes over Agent Wilson's place on the team.
4	4	"Rosetta"	Karen Gaviola	Zak Penn	August 1, 2011	2.03
While raiding a Red Flag operation, Dr. Rosen and his team find Anna (Liane Balaban), an Alpha who can understand and translate any language. While the others try to track down and stop someone they believe to be the Red Flag leader, Milo Kosar, Gary bonds with Anna over their similar conditions. The team eventually determines that Anna is the leader of Red Flag and its reach is far greater than initially feared. Red Flag attempts to take down a lab manufacturing a medication that stops Alphas from being born. In a subplot, near the beginning we see how Gary makes his mother take care of him with almost everything (e.g. making him water until he judges it perfect). When he meets Anna she tells him that he doesn't need Dr. Rosen or his mother to take care of him, although Gary chooses to stay with The Alphas. When his mother brings him his water he states "if it's not right I'll go make it myself, I can take care of myself", suggesting that Anna may have changed the way he thinks of himself and his abilities to take care of himself.
5	5	"Never Let Me Go"	Jeffrey Hunt	Jordan Rosenberg	August 8, 2011	2.01
An outbreak of unexplainable deaths in a small town has turned people into zombie-like creatures. As the team investigates, they find an alpha mother, Jessica Elkhart, out for revenge by using her Oxytocin causing people's cortisone levels to be sky high. While investigating, Rachel is lured in and left for dead. Featuring guest star Lindsay Wagner as Dr. Vanessa Calder, a character from Warehouse 13, thus putting Alphas in Syfy's shared universe, along with Eureka.
6	6	"Bill and Gary's Excellent Adventure"	Leslie Libman	Adam Levy	August 15, 2011	1.83
Bill and Gary pursue an outside case involving a kidnapped heiress, putting their Alpha powers to the ultimate test while becoming friends. Nina and Hicks grow closer together, and Nina reveals that she fears her powers sometimes due to her pushing an ex-boyfriend to commit suicide. At the end of the case, the security guard (Alaina Huffman) of the heiress hires two thugs to kidnap her, and the whole team safely saves the heiress. Bill gives Gary driving lessons as promised. The title of this episode is a reference to the 1989 comedy film, Bill & Ted's Excellent Adventure.
7	7	"Catch and Release"	Kevin Hooks	Michael Karnow	August 22, 2011	1.87
The team is ordered to find and protect Skylar (Summer Glau), an Alpha with the skill to build almost anything that could be dangerous in the wrong hands. Gary's mom, after the events of the last episode, tries to keep Gary out of the Alpha's office. Skylar is chased by NSA for sending encrypted messages to someone called "Z". It turns out that Z, short for Zoe, is Skylar's five-year-old daughter who created a method of super encryption, enabling Skylar and Zoe to communicate safely. The Alphas let Skylar and her daughter go to live in Canada in peace in exchange for the tracking system which Rosen then destroys, in order to protect the Alphas from his superiors who might want to use their powers for ulterior motives. Gary confronts his mother, telling her he won't leave the team.
8	8	"A Short Time in Paradise"	John Showalter	Michael Chamoy	August 29, 2011	1.79
Hicks and Nina are entranced by a deadly cult leader named Jonas (Garret Dillahunt), whose powers slowly kill his followers. Hicks and Nina get personal. Bill tries to persuade Dr. Rosen to have the team learn tactical maneuvers for their subsequent missions. Rachel brings Gary on a date to her sister's wedding celebration. Rachel urges her father (Daniel Kash) to go the doctor due to him showing early signs of throat cancer. Dr. Rosen tries to stop people from dying at the hands of Jonas and is forced to make a difficult decision at the end.
9	9	"Blind Spot"	Michael Watkins	Ira Steven Behr & Robert Hewitt Wolfe	September 12, 2011	1.51
The team captures a rogue doctor (Brent Spiner), who has a history of using stem cells to create more Alphas. The doctor himself is also an Alpha who makes sonar waves. He is said to having dolphin-like abilities. An Alpha bounty hunter (Rebecca Mader) enters the headquarters, kidnapping Rachel and terrorizing the others in a deadly game of cat and mouse. As the building begins to crumble from the sonar waves, the team attempts to make it out alive.
10	10	"The Unusual Suspects"	J. Miller Tobin	Marc Bernardin	September 19, 2011	1.39
The DoD imprisons Rosen and his team after they suspect that one of the members is a Red Flag traitor. Everyone begins to question each others' motives, while Rosen accuses Hicks of being the traitor. It is eventually revealed that the team has not been betrayed, but infiltrated by a shape-shifter posing as Rosen.
11	11	"Original Sin"	Nick Copus	Story by : Zak Penn & Michael Karnow; Teleplay by : Ira Steven Behr, Robert Hewitt Wolfe, Zak Penn & Michael Karnow	September 26, 2011	1.16
Rosen and his team must choose sides when the Department of Defense launches a full-out assault on Red Flag. Dr. Rosen reunites with his daughter Danielle (Kathleen Munroe), who is being hunted by Red Flag and others. Gary mourns the loss of Anna. Stanton pays a visit to Dr. Rosen. The team questions whether they should continue working as is after blood shed between the DOD and Red Flag after being set up. Dr. Rosen publicly announces the existence of Alphas in a secretly taped meeting with the government. He is last seen being taken away.

=== Season 2 (2012) ===
No. overall	No. in season	Title	Directed by	Written by	Original release date	US viewers (millions)
12	1	"Wake Up Call"	Matt Hastings	Robert Hewitt Wolfe	July 23, 2012	1.75
In the aftermath of Dr. Rosen's revelation of the existence of Alphas to the world, his dismantled team must be brought back together to save the lives of two of their own, Gary and Bill, who have been taken hostage by Cornell and the other Alphas being held prisoners by the government. As the Alphas plan a breakout, the Red Flag plot thickens, and the DOD soon realize they need Dr. Rosen's team more than they thought. Gary struggles to let his brain reboot and get his life back after being implanted with a chip that took away his abilities and communication while being locked up by the DOD.
13	2	"The Quick and the Dead"	Michael Nankin	Michael Karnow	July 30, 2012	1.35
Dr. Rosen and his team launch an investigation into a killer with super-speed, but problems arise when the group realizes that their actions have led the evil Alpha directly to them, which results in deadly consequences. Danielle Rosen continues to play both sides, while engaging in a relationship with Cameron. Stanton shows his vulnerable side to Danielle. Gary continues to adjust to working with the DOD. Nina struggles with old ways, learns of Cameron and Danielle's relationship, and is done working with the team. Bill questions Dr. Rosen's leadership abilities. The group realizes they can trust no one.
14	3	"Alpha Dogs"	Nick Copus	Eric Tuchman	August 6, 2012	1.38
While investigating the death of an Alpha, the team learns of an underground Alpha fight club. Harken meets a mysterious girl there named Kat (Erin Way), who offers to assist him when he goes undercover to learn more about the fight club. Kat teaches Bill how to channel his ability without getting angry. Kat is kidnapped and the team tries to rescue her. As Gary struggles with Anna's death, Gary's mom learns to let go and allow him to grow independently.
15	4	"When Push Comes to Shove"	Omar Madha	Adam Levy	August 13, 2012	0.99
The team investigates a string of Alpha-related crimes before realizing the Alpha they're looking for is one of their own. Gary moves into the office causing Bill and Rachel to be surprised one morning. Nina's past catches up with her. John reveals past wounds, causing a hiatus in his relationship with Rachel. Nina uses her abilities on the others and must learn to trust herself again with Dr. Rosen's help.
16	5	"Gaslight"	Leslie Libman	Terri Hughes Burton & Ron Milbauer	August 20, 2012	1.38
A comatose young Alpha, Jason, is causing other Alphas to have strange hallucinations due to a mysterious device that amplifies his abilities. Hicks, Bill, and Rachel struggle to find out what's going on while having hallucinations of their own. Nina learns that her Alpha ability has new and more powerful facets. Gary creates @Anna_Lives on Twitter and posts "the revolution is coming #AnnaLives #Alphas". Dr. Rosen questions if there is a link between the photic stimulator and Parish. Rachel and Nina begin to mend their relationship. Kat recalls the memory of a lady in a blue dress.
17	6	"Alphaville"	Nick Copus	Michael Chamoy	August 27, 2012	1.73
Determined to find what the ability-enhancing device (photic stimulator) is fully capable of, Dr. Rosen brings the team to a small community for refugee Alphas, in order to request help from Skylar Adams. Dr. Rosen's daughter compromises everything when she exploits her relationship with Hicks to feed Stanton Parish information. During their visit, Skylar's daughter Zoe gets kidnapped by Parish's men, who want the device back, which amplifies both Scipios and Rachel's abilities. Zoe is rescued by Hicks, Bill and Skylar. In the end, Dr. Rosen tasks Bill with finding the mole in their midst, and Skylar is approached by Stanton Parish.
18	7	"Gods and Monsters"	Mairzee Almas	Kira Snyder	September 10, 2012	1.32
When Jason Miller returns to high school after waking from coma, he risks the lives of many students, as he starts to control them with his amplified ability. While the team tries to stop him, Dr. Rosen is saved by Stanton Parish, and they must work together to save Jason. Bill hunts for the mole.
19	8	"Falling"	Nick Copus	Nina Fiore & John Herrera	September 17, 2012	1.31
After discovering the identity of the mole, Dr. Rosen is faced with a difficult decision. Meanwhile, Kat goes on her first mission and reuniting with someone from her past causing mixed feelings on how to proceed with the mission. Hicks' son visits and Hicks wonders whether he's gifted. John gets ready to meet Rachel's parents.
20	9	"The Devil Will Drag You Under"	Matt Hastings	Robert Hewitt Wolfe	September 24, 2012	1.23
The first stage of Parish's endgame comes into focus as both Dani and Hicks are caught up in his web. Dr. Rosen and Hicks butt heads. Meanwhile, as the team tracks down a prototype weapon Hicks stole for Parish that could potentially kill millions of people, Hicks' betrayal may not be what it seems. Parish's alpha, Agnes, rips open Hick's mind hoping to find out what's really going on. Dani plays Parish but consequences follow.
21	10	"Life After Death"	J. Miller Tobin	Eric Tuchman	October 1, 2012	1.07
The team deals with the fallout of Parish's attempted attack on New York and the team deals with Dani's death, with Dr. Rosen and Hicks being hit the hardest. Hicks asks Nina to push him. Gary takes care of a baby alpha named Adam, while his parents come for him causing the team to question what is really going on. Rachel and John take a big step in their relationship.
22	11	"If Memory Serves"	Allan Kroeker	Terri Hughes Burton & Ron Milbauer	October 8, 2012	1.12
Kat and Hicks find an Alpha, Mitchell (Sean Astin), being held captive by another Alpha who has the ability to heal. Mitchell has the ability to show people's memories to others. In attempting to bring Mitchell back to base, he offers to help Kat and Hicks with their memories. Gary's mom is hospitalized from a motor vehicle accident; complications arise. Bill teases Rachel about her relationship advancement. Hicks struggles with Dani's death. The senator threatens Dr. Rosen and his team after Nina reveals she is the one who pushed her. Parish is remorseful about Dani's death. Dr. Rosen discovers Parish's weakness and intends to use it against him.
23	12	"Need to Know"	Nick Copus	Michael Karnow & Adam Levy	October 15, 2012	1.16
Parish's plot thickens causing possibly thousands of deaths in the long run. Dr. Rosen picks certain members of the team to move forward against Parish, while the others are left in the dark, causing trust issues. Cornell is caught after trying to capture Mitchell. Skylar and Zoe are held captive by Parish's men and forced to design a gadget that will lead to the "end of the world". Gary gets booted from the hospital. Dr. Rosen and Hicks find Parish's center and learn about his plan. Dr. Rosen stays behind in the center to take out Parish while Hicks warns the group. Dr. Rosen is shot and left for dead.
24	13	"God's Eye"	Matt Hastings	Bruce Miller	October 22, 2012	1.17
Kat threatens to walk out on everything, while Bill is the only one who can get through to her. Dr. Rosen is healed as much as possible by another Alpha. Dani returns in what appears to be Dr. Rosen's hallucinations. The team races against time, learning Parish has set the photic stimulators to go off at 8:18 p.m. on the 150th anniversary of the day he discovered he was an Alpha. Gary visits his mother in the hospital, where he runs into Dr. Rosen. He helps him find Parish's "god's eye view", in Grand Central Station in New York City, where Parish plans on watching the "end of the world". The team races to find and disable Parish's bombs, while Dr. Rosen and Parish square off. When the photic stimulators go off in Grand Central, Gary is the only one not affected.

== Reception ==
=== Critical reception ===
Alphas has received mixed reviews. On review aggregator Rotten Tomatoes, the first season holds a 73% "Fresh" score, based on 33 critic reviews with an average rating of 6.6/10. The website's critics consensus reads, "It treads familiar ground, but Alphas succeeds on the strength of its characters and brisk pacing." The second season holds an 89% "Fresh" score, based on nine critic reviews with an average rating of 7.8/10. The website's consensus reads, "Alphas reaches its prime in its second and final season, bolstered by higher stakes and the reassuring presence of David Strathairn."

On Metacritic, which uses a weighted average, the first season holds a score of 64/100 based on 17 critic reviews, indicating "generally favorable" reviews.

The New York Post said of the first episode: "Alphas is fun, sure, but it has a 'been there, done that' feel." TV Fanatic gave the show an average review saying, "Everything Alphas brought to the table has been done before." The New York Times gave the show a negative review: "It's neither here nor there: low on sci-fi mystery and intrigue and not yet convincing as ensemble drama. Right now it feels like the beta version."

Variety gave a positive review: "At first blush, though, give Alphas high marks for effort and ingenuity, demonstrating a TV show needn't provide major pyrotechnics or a reinvented wheel to lay the groundwork for solid summer entertainment where the characters, somewhat refreshingly, are only sort-of super."

The Los Angeles Times gave the pilot a positive review: "Alphas deftly balances all the building blocks of great genre – nonhuman abilities, twisty plot, cool special effects, smart dialogue and characters you want to spend more time with. And that's the most impressive superpower of all."

After eight episodes had aired, Maureen Ryan of AOL TV called it the summer's most promising new drama: "Not only has Alphas successfully avoided many of the pitfalls that have bedeviled other superhero-flavored projects, it's done a good job of balancing character-driven moments with taut, well-paced storytelling."

=== Ratings ===
The pilot episode premiered with 2.5 million total viewers, scoring 1.2 million viewers in the 18–49 demographic and 1.3 million in the 25–54 demographic, making it Syfy's most watched debut in two years. Live + 7 day ratings for the series premiere updated those numbers to 3.6 million total viewers, scoring 1.7 million viewers in the 18–49 demographic and 1.8 million in the 25–54 demographic. By the 11th episode (its season finale) however, the ratings had dropped to 1.16 million total viewers.

In the UK the show was broadcast on Tuesdays. The first episode had 666,000 viewers altogether, 595,000 live and 71,000 on timeshift. When the second episode aired, the viewer count dipped to 469,000 together, live and on timeshift. Despite the fall in viewers on a Tuesday showing, the show has become popular in the UK with Friday repeats rounding up around 150,000 viewers.

U.S. ratings

Season	Season Premiere			Season Finale		
Season	Date	Viewers Total	Viewers 18–49	Date	Viewers Total	Viewers 18–49
1	July 11, 2011	2.52	1.21	September 26, 2011	1.16	—N/a

United Kingdom ratings

Series	episode	Viewers (5* and 5*+1)
1	1	775,000
1	2	682,000
1	3	585,000
1	4	555,000
1	5	513,000
1	6	605,000
1	7	527,000
1	8	512,000
1	9	505,000
1	10	502,000
1	11	500,000

== In popular culture ==
In episode 21 of season six of the sitcom The Big Bang Theory entitled "The Closure Alternative", the unresolved cliffhanger ending of Alphas causes character Sheldon Cooper distress about not having 'closure', as a lead-in to one of that show's plot lines.

== International broadcasting ==
Country	Network	Premiere date
Canada	Space	July 11, 2011
Canada	addikTV (in French)	October 1, 2012
United Kingdom	5* Syfy	October 18, 2011; April 19, 2012
Spain	Syfy; Cuatroº	December 13, 2011; July 11, 2012
Australia	Seven Network; Sci-Fi Channel	December 7, 2012; February 3, 2012
Finland	C More Series	January 10, 2013
France	Syfy	February 21, 2012
Brazil	Syfy	2011
New Zealand	Four (New Zealand)	January 2013
Italy	Rai 4	May 17, 2012
Sweden	C More Series	January 10, 2013
Philippines	Jack TV	January 27, 2013
Germany	Syfy	February 14, 2013
South Africa	Universal Channel; Omnitrix TV	March 25, 2012; February 11, 2020
