= The Waking Dead =

- Grimm episode
- Episode no.: Season 2 Episode 21
- Directed by: Steven DePaul
- Written by: Jim Kouf; David Greenwalt
- Cinematography by: Marshall Adams
- Editing by: Casey Rohrs
- Production code: 221
- Original air date: May 14, 2013
- Running time: 42 minutes

Guest appearances
- Shohreh Aghdashloo as Stefania Vaduva Popescu; James Frain as Eric Renard; Reg E. Cathey as Baron Samedi; Danny Bruno as Bud Wurstner; Sharon Sachs as Dr. Harper; Christian Lagadec as Renard's Confidant; Robert Blanche as Sgt. Franco

Episode chronology
← Previous "Kiss of the Muse"	Next → "Goodnight, Sweet Grimm"
- Grimm season 2

"The Waking Dead" is the 21st episode of season 2 of supernatural drama television series Grimm and the 43rd episode overall, which premiered on May 14, 2013, on the cable network NBC. The episode was written by series creators Jim Kouf and David Greenwalt, and was directed by Steven DePaul.

== Plot ==
Opening quote: "Papa Ghede is a handsom fellow in his hat and coat of black. Papa Ghede is going to the palace! He'll eat and drink when he gets back!"

In Vienna, Adalind's (Claire Coffee) and Eric's (James Frain) intimate encounter is interrupted when the King, his father, calls him. Adalind hears the conversation and finds out he is planning on travelling to Portland to meet with a man named Baron Samedi.

Wu (Reggie Lee) and Sgt. Franco (Robert Blanche) are called to a disturbance in a house. A man, Richard Mulpus (Solomon Brende), attacks them but is killed by Franco. His nose is oozing a green substance and a woman is dead. Stefania (Shohreh Aghdashloo) brings a contract for Adalind to sign but, as she is suspicious, Stefania uses a spell to make her hand sign it.

Hank (Russell Hornsby) discovers that Mulpus had a death certificate signed just three days ago. He and Nick talk to the doctor who signed the certificate, who claims that he was officially pronounced dead but gets shocked when he finds out that the corpse is not in its place. Nick notices there's a man with a top hat (Reg E. Cathey) following them. Dr. Harper (Sharon Sachs) is about to perform surgery on the dead woman when she suddenly awakes and her body later disappears.

Juliette decides to go with Monroe (Silas Weir Mitchell) to find what Nick was trying to show her the night she lost her memories. At first hesitation, he along with Bud (Danny Bruno) take her to the spice shop. After a debate with Rosalee (Bree Turner), they finally agree to woge into their respective Wesen in front of her. Renard's (Sasha Roiz) spy notifies him that Frau Pech has told him that someone else is carrying Royal blood, convincing Renard that the baby would be sold and he would offer money for the baby.

Finding that the man in the top hat took the woman, Nick and Hank discover he is a Cracher-Mortel. This Wesen have a spit that can make a deathlike experience, like a zombie. In a bus, the man woges and kills many people, planning to make an army of zombies. Eric arrives at Portland, calling Renard to taunt him. He then meets with Baron, who is revealed to be the man with the top hat. The episode ends with a title reading, "To be continued".

== Reception ==
=== Viewers ===
The episode was viewed by 5.36 million people, earning a 1.7/5 in the 18-49 rating demographics on the Nielsen ratings scale, ranking first on its timeslot and eighth for the night in the 18-49 demographics, behind Dancing with the Stars, So You Think You Can Dance, a rerun of The Voice, New Girl, NCIS: Los Angeles, NCIS, and The Voice. This was a 6% decrease in viewership from the previous episode, which was watched by 5.67 million viewers with a 1.8/5. This means that 1.7 percent of all households with televisions watched the episode, while 5 percent of all households watching television at that time watched it. With DVR factoring in, the episode was watched by 8.47 million viewers with a 3.0 ratings share in the 18-49 demographics.

=== Critical reviews ===
"The Waking Dead" received positive reviews. The A.V. Club's Kevin McFarland gave the episode a "B" grade and wrote, "It's becoming a common occurrence for me to grow increasingly worried about the direction of an episode of Grimm up through the middle, only to have the back half wind together the various positive threads into something coherent. 'The Waking Dead' isn't much of a complete episode, and the pace doesn't set out to provide the same kind of payoffs as a typical case-of-the-week plot, but there's a simple reason for that: It's the first half of a two-part finale. The dramatic cliffhanger may be lacking intensity, instead inspiring a few questions, but it's a testament to the progress the show has made that even when the structure doesn't quite fit together or build properly, there are enough positive character moments to keep it from completely devolving. This is all setup for next week's finale, slowly building through longer scenes instead of cutting quickly and putting clues together at a healthy clip."

Nick McHatton from TV Fanatic, gave a 4.0 star rating out of 5, stating: "'The Walking Dead' was a difficult episode to judge. It's unfortunate NBC couldn't work out the scheduling to air this and next Tuesday's installment back to back since so much of hinges on what's coming next. Nevertheless, this was a step up from last week's underwhelming episode."

Shilo Adams from TV Overmind, wrote: "Although the scene where Rosalee, Bud, and Monroe woge in front of Juliette was very strong and nicely balanced the comedy with the genre elements (Bud was especially great), that really should have happened earlier in the show."
