= Dean Cook =

British actor

- Born: UK
- Occupation: Actor
- Years active: 1992-present

Dean Cook is a British actor, best known for playing Ashley Thompson on the sitcom Time Gentlemen Please, and for his appearance in the 2000 film The Little Vampire.

His younger sister, Billie, is an actress in television and film.
