= Volcanalis =

- Grimm episode
- Episode no.: Season 2 Episode 18
- Directed by: David Grossman
- Written by: Jim Kouf; David Greenwalt
- Cinematography by: Eliot Rockett
- Editing by: Casey Rohrs
- Production code: 218
- Original air date: April 26, 2013
- Running time: 42 minutes

Guest appearances
- Shohreh Aghdashloo as Stefania Vaduva Popescu; Bertila Damas as Pilar; Gill Gayle as Markus Hemmings; Danny Bruno as Bud Wurstner

Episode chronology
| ← Previous "One Angry Fuchsbau" | Next → "Endangered" |
- Grimm season 2

"Volcanalis" is the 18th episode and of the supernatural drama television series Grimm of season 2 and the 40th overall, which premiered on April 26, 2013, on NBC. The episode was originally scheduled to air on April 19, but it was preempted for coverage related to the Boston Marathon bombing. The episode was written by series creators Jim Kouf and David Greenwalt, and was directed by David Grossman.

== Plot ==
Opening quote: "The demon came home, and he declared that the air was not clear. 'I smell the flesh of man."

In the Mount Hood, a geologist, Jill Prembrey (Nicole Santora) retrieves rocks near a fumarole. Then, she is attacked by Markus Hemmings (Gill Gayle) who tries to get back the rocks but she manages to escape. He then woges into a Taureus-Armenta. Later, Jill is killed at her home by a creature covered in lava called Volcanalis.

In the station, Hank (Russell Hornsby) is sent on vacation on behest of Nick (David Giuntoli), Wu (Reggie Lee) and Renard (Sasha Roiz). In Vienna, Adalind (Claire Coffee) is taken by Frau Pech (Mary McDonald-Lewis) to visit Stefania Vaduva Popescu (Shohreh Aghdashloo), who explains that a bloodline must be established for the child and they subdue Adalind to perform an extraction of the fetus' blood.

Juliette's visions continue haunting her, to the point where she crashes her car. She then visits Pilar (Bertila Damas) for help and she is given a tea to help her to focus and enter again in the past in an attempt to get the memories back. Nick and Wu go to the fumarole with Jill's boss to investigate the scene, where the boss retrieves rocks from the fumarole while Markus unsuccessfully tries to stop them.

Adalind's test shows that the baby is of Royal blood and Stefania offers her money for the baby when is born. Adalind refuses the money, preferring to get her Hexenbiest powers back. Upon finding out that Markus's wife was killed years ago, Nick and Renard bring him to the station. He claims that he didn't kill the archaeologists, he was in fact warning them of the danger that would happen to them and they were killed by a creature named Volcanalis for stealing its rocks.

The boss is killed by the Volcanalis that night and Nick tries to fight him back but he is no match for him. With information from the trailer, Nick, Renard and Monroe (Silas Weir Mitchell) find that the Volcanalis is responsible for the eruption in Pompeii. They decide to call Markus for help as he is an expert on the topic. Markus claims that nothing can stop it "until hell freezes over". Nick then gets an idea to use liquid nitrogen to kill him.

Nick, Monroe, Renard and Markus go to the mountain and take the rocks to a warehouse to wait for the Volcanalis to arrive. Using Markus as a bait, the Volcanalis appears and while advancing towards him, Nick, Monroe and Renard use the liquid nitrogen hoses to wash him and freeze him as a solid rock. Seeing he is still alive, Nick gives Markus a hammer to kill it so he can avenge his wife. Markus hits the Volcanalis until its eyes freeze over. Meanwhile, Juliette decides to remake the previous memories of Nick and she manages to control the problem. The episode ends as she now remembers the memory of Nick proposing to her.

== Reception ==
=== Viewers ===
The episode was viewed by 4.85 million people, earning a 1.3/4 in the 18-49 rating demographics on the Nielson ratings scale, ranking second on its timeslot and fourth for the night in the 18-49 demographics, behind Blue Bloods, Undercover Boss, and Shark Tank. This was a 6% decrease in viewership from the previous episode, which was watched by 5.13 million viewers with a 1.5/5. This means that 1.3 percent of all households with televisions watched the episode, while 4 percent of all households watching television at that time watched it. With DVR factoring in, the episode was watched by 6.98 million viewers with a 2.2 ratings share in the 18-49 demographics.

=== Critical reviews ===
"Volcanalis" received positive reviews. The A.V. Club's Kevin McFarland gave the episode a "B−" grade and wrote, "I don't like when the mythology and creature abilities on Grimm leave wide gaps for me to think about logic problems. It distracts from the episode, takes me out of a world I've come to enjoy, and for the most part learned to accept despite its flaws. But when the logic is stretched so thin — Does the Volcanalis kill everyone who takes rocks from near any dormant volcano anywhere around the world at any time? — it's impossible to ignore. Even with the benefit of two very interesting creature — or one Wesen and a demigod figure — 'Volcanalis' suffers from being too ridiculous to work completely as an episodic diversion."

Nick McHatton from TV Fanatic, gave a 4.1 star rating out of 5, stating: "While serial elements accomplish two things: the first being it keeps reviews and the analysis fresh, and the second being is I enjoy storytelling that moves at a faster pace. In the course of a 22-episode season, however, it's sometimes refreshing to take a small step away from season long plots to just have an enjoyable time with a show and characters you love. It was basically like guys night out, but in typical Grimm fashion."

Shilo Adams from TV Overmind, wrote: "The decision to use color in the Juliette memory was a great one. I liked how the more she remembered, the brighter/fuller everything became. Simple? Yes. Visually effective? Definitely."
