= Goodnight, Sweet Grimm =

- Grimm episode
- Episode no.: Season 2 Episode 22
- Directed by: Norberto Barba
- Written by: Jim Kouf; David Greenwalt
- Cinematography by: Eliot Rockett
- Editing by: Lance Stubblefield; Chris Willingham
- Production code: 222
- Original air date: May 21, 2013
- Running time: 42 minutes

Guest appearances
- Shohreh Aghdashloo as Stefania Vaduva Popescu; James Frain as Eric Renard; Reg E. Cathey as Baron Samedi; Christian Lagadec as Renard's Confidant

Episode chronology
← Previous "The Waking Dead"	Next → "The Ungrateful Dead"
- Grimm season 2

"Goodnight, Sweet Grimm" is the 22nd episode of season 2, the 44th overall, and season finale of the supernatural drama television series Grimm which premiered on May 21, 2013, on the cable network NBC. The episode was written by series creators Jim Kouf and David Greenwalt, and was directed by Norberto Barba.

== Plot ==
Opening quote: "And flights of angels sing thee to thy rest."

Eric (James Frain) meets with the Baron (Reg E. Cathey) to discuss their move. Eric then lets him spit his substance on one of his bodyguards, severely beginning his transformation into a zombie. Baron then makes a ritual to lead all the zombies to Portland. Nick's (David Giuntoli) and Juliette's (Bitsie Tulloch) relationship begins to build up now that she knows about the Grimm world.

Renard (Sasha Roiz) is told by his informant that Eric possessed death certificates and passports. In Vienna, Adalind (Claire Coffee) is knocked unconscious by Frau Pech (Mary McDonald-Lewis), who uses a potion to impersonate her appearance. Nick and Wu (Reggie Lee) are called to a building where the zombies were sent. Nick is attacked by a zombie driver, Al (Timothy Whitcomb), whom he knocks unconscious. He and Hank (Russell Hornsby) take Al to the spice shop, where Monroe (Silas Weir Mitchell) and Rosalee (Bree Turner) state that to cure him, they have to stimulate the central nervous system through the use of a substance.

Eric meets with Renard to discuss his mother and asks Renard to come with him to Europe. While inspecting a car that was left in the road, Nick senses something and notices containers at the port. Stefania (Shohreh Aghdashloo) meets with "Adalind", and then explains that, for their purposes, they will take Frau Pech's heart. Stefania and her henchmen knock out "Adalind" and take her heart from the stomach. Adalind returns to her normal form, certain that her powers are back.

The antidote works and Al is restored to normal, but he can't remember what happened while he was in that state but he remembers that a man with a top hat may be responsible. Adding that his car was found near containers, Nick deduces that the zombies could be being kept on the harbor. They decide to go to the harbor to give them the antidote but not before Nick gives Rosalee the key to hide. Nick, Monroe, Rosalee and Juliette arrive at the harbor and Baron begins opening containers, unleashing the zombies onto them.

Rosalee manages to give the antidote to some zombies but as there are too many, they are forced to escape. Nick then hears Baron and decides to go after him on the top of a container. They fight on it until both fall inside the container. Baron flees and Nick finds a coffin with a passport for a man named "Thomas Schirach" and a picture of himself. Baron then appears and spits his substance onto him. Monroe, Rosalee and Juliette are forced to flee when the zombies surround them. Eric arrives at the container with Baron where they are planning on transporting the coffin, which contains Nick in a coma while he is becoming a zombie. The episode ends with a card reading, "To be continued... Oh come on, You knew this was coming."

== Reception ==
=== Viewers ===
The episode was viewed by 4.99 million people, earning a 1.7/5 in the 18-49 rating demographics on the Nielsen ratings scale, ranking first on its timeslot and fifth for the night in the 18-49 demographics, behind So You Think You Can Dance, an NBC news report, Dancing with the Stars, and The Voice. This was a 7% decrease in viewership from the previous episode, which was watched by 5.36 million viewers with a 1.7/5. The episode was also a 12% decrease in viewership from the season premiere, which was watched by 5.64 million viewers with a 2.0/5, and also a 3% decrease in viewership from the previous season finale, which was watched by 5.10 million viewers with a 1.6/5 This means that 1.7 percent of all households with televisions watched the episode, while 5 percent of all households watching television at that time watched it. With DVR factoring in, the episode was watched by 7.79 million viewers with a 2.7 ratings share in the 18-49 demographics.

Overall, the second season of Grimm averaged 6.95 million viewers. This was a 9% improvement over the first season, which averaged 6.35 million viewers.

=== Critical reviews ===
"Goodnight, Sweet Grimm" received mostly positive reviews. The A.V. Club's Kevin McFarland gave the episode an "A−" grade and wrote, "'Goodnight Sweet Grimm' gave me similar jolts of delight and excitement. I should immediately note that these feelings are marked by many asterisks, because comparing this show to Buffy dooms Grimm to languish in a towering shadow of cultural significance and wild entertainment. After two full seasons, Grimm is nowhere close to accomplishing what Buffy had already done. It just gets a bit too hard not to note the similarities at a certain point, especially since David Greenwalt's work lends better to the parallels than Jim Kouf's work on Taxi (the Jimmy Fallon one) or Snow Dogs. Grimm shares a good amount of DNA with Angel, as a more adult detective procedural without the coming-of-age plotlines — though I would probably watch that. (Quick, someone get on a prequel web comic that shows Aunt Marie's early life becoming a legendary feared Grimm.)"

Nick McHatton from TV Fanatic, gave a 4.8 star rating out of 5, stating: "Nick's fate in 'Goodnight, Sweet Grimm' might have become obvious in the final minutes of the finale, but watching those suspicions play out didn't lessen the weight of it. They only made it more exciting."

Shilo Adams from TV Overmind, wrote: "So, season two: better or worse than season one? Overall, I go better – season two hasn't been without its faults (Juliette's amnesia went on for way too long, a lot of vagueness about the serialized plot), but I think it had some pretty high highs and felt more self-assured. Plus, the finale was much less frustrating than last season, which makes me think that season three will be in a position to hit the ground running."
