= The Ungrateful Dead =

- Grimm episode
- Episode no.: Season 3 Episode 1
- Directed by: Norberto Barba
- Written by: Jim Kouf; David Greenwalt
- Cinematography by: Marshall Adams
- Editing by: Chris Willingham
- Production code: 301
- Original air date: October 25, 2013
- Running time: 42 minutes

Guest appearances
- Shohreh Aghdashloo as Stefania Vaduva Popescu; Reg E. Cathey as Baron Samedi; James Frain as Eric Renard; Christian Lagadec as Renard's Confidant; Robert Blanche as Sgt. Franco

Episode chronology
← Previous "Goodnight, Sweet Grimm"	Next → "PTZD"
- Grimm season 3

"The Ungrateful Dead" is the 1st episode and season premiere of the supernatural drama television series Grimm of season 3 and the 45th overall, which premiered on October 25, 2013, on the cable network NBC. The episode was written by series creators Jim Kouf and David Greenwalt, and was directed by Norberto Barba.

== Plot ==
Opening quote: "But if I stand at the sick person's feet, he is mine."

15 minutes before the ending of the last episode, Eric (James Frain) leaves his hotel room to meet with Baron (Reg E. Cathey). He doesn't know that he is being followed by Renard (Sasha Roiz), who follows him to the harbor. In the harbor, while trying to flee in Nick's Toyota Landcruiser, Monroe (Silas Weir Mitchell) gets the SUV stuck so that he, Rosalee (Bree Turner) and Juliette (Bitsie Tulloch) are forced to flee on foot.

Renard arrives later and while inspecting a container, is attacked by two zombies. Monroe, Rosalee and Juliette get on the top of a container to fight the zombies that are beginning to reach them. Juliette calls Hank (Russell Hornsby) to send help, prompting him to send Wu (Reggie Lee) and a unit to go to the area. The police help Monroe, Rosalee and Juliette to escape from the zombies while Renard kills his attackers using his Wesen form.

Realizing the Baron is planning to take Nick (David Giuntoli) to Vienna on a private plane, Hank calls airport officers to stop the flight. However, the Baron uses his powers to spit on them, starting their transformation into zombies and flees. Renard, Hank, Monroe, Rosalee and Juliette get to the airport but they are too late as the plane already left and as the plane will cross international waters, there's no justification to stop the flight. In the plane, the Baron is celebrating when Nick begins to slam his coffin. He breaks free of his coffin and attacks the Baron and the pilots. This causes the plane to lose control and crash in the woods, killing the Baron and wounding the pilots.

In Vienna, Stefania (Shohreh Aghdashloo) takes out Frau Pech's heart and seals it in a box. She then calls Adalind (Claire Coffee) to tell her that they will need Frau Pech's body parts in order to bring back her powers. They cut her feet, hands and eyes and then go to a field of poppies. In the field, Adalind digs, and buries the body parts and the heart in the earth. This causes the poppies around them to die and the powers of Hexenbiest are restored to Adalind, but she needs to collect all the dead poppies.

In the spice shop, while working to find a cure, Juliette suggests using the Williamson ether synthesis to lock a gas in a jar so the zombies can go back to normality. Wu and the other police officers have put the zombies in a container. They are convinced to allow Juliette and Rosalee to throw the glass jars of gas into the container, which cures all the zombies. Meanwhile, Nick wanders off into the woods. He stumbles into a bar and grill, and begins to attack some of the customers while others flee. Hank receives a call about the plane crash and goes to the site with Renard, Monroe, Juliette and Rosalee.

Learning of the incident in the bar, Renard, Hank, Monroe, Rosalee and Juliette head there to find Nick. Renard, Hank and Monroe enter the bar but Nick has left. Monroe then uses his ability to scent to find Nick's path. While Hank and Monroe look for Nick, Nick has found a house in the woods with a family entering while he stares at the family, seemingly planning to attack them.

== Reception ==
=== Viewers ===
The episode was viewed by 6.15 million people, earning a 1.8/6 in the 18-49 rating demographics on the Nielson ratings scale, ranking second on its timeslot and third for the night in the 18-49 demographics, behind Dracula, and Shark Tank. The viewership was higher than any episode of the second season and also was a 23% increase in viewership from the previous episode, which was watched by 4.99 million viewers with a 1.7/5. The episode was also a 9% increase in viewership from the previous season premiere, which was watched by 5.64 million viewers with a 2.0/5. This means that 1.8 percent of all households with televisions watched the episode, while 6 percent of all households watching television at that time watched it. With DVR factoring in, the episode was watched by 9.23 million viewers with a 3.0 ratings share in the 18-49 demographics.

=== Critical reviews ===
"The Ungrateful Dead" received positive reviews. The A.V. Club's Kevin McFarland gave the episode a "B−" grade and wrote, "Instead, 'The Ungrateful Dead' repeats the final moments of last season's premiere and picks up seconds after, as the Portland police round up the Cracher-Mortel's zombified creations in a shipping container, and the rest of the gang searches for Nick before he can be flown away to Europe to be used as some kind of caged, anti-Wesen assassin by the royals."

Nick McHatton from TV Fanatic, gave a 4.0 star rating out of 5, stating: "The moment that stands out the most with Nick was when he looks in the mirror. On some level he recognizes what he's doing and what he's become. I don't think he's completely in control, however, since he breaks the mirror pretty quickly. It's going to be a fun ride to see how Nick ends up and what actions he takes as a zombie."
