= Erin Way =

American actress (born 1987)

- Born: September 13, 1987 (age 38); Spokane, Washington, U.S.
- Education: Portland State University
- Occupation: Actress
- Years active: 2007–present

Erin Way (born September 13, 1987) is an American actress. She is known for her role as Kat in the Syfy drama series Alphas. She joined the show in the third episode of the second season.

A former ballet dancer, Erin Way started acting while in high school.

== Filmography ==
Film and television
Year	Title	Role	Notes
2007	Have Love, Will Travel	Beth	
2007	Girlfriends		Episode: "Where Did Lynn-Digo?"
2008	Private Practice	Jenna	Episode: "Let It Go"
2009	Splatter	Fiona Crown	Eight episodes
2009–2010	I <3 Vampires	Lucy	Twenty-seven episodes
2010	Day One	Crystal	Episode: "Pilot"
2010	Sympathy for Delicious	Rianna Tevy (uncredited)	
2010–2011	Detroit 1-8-7	Wendy Chapin-Lomeister	Six episodes
2011	Hawaii Five-0	Nikki Royce	Episode: "Ka Iwi Kapu"
2011	When You Find Me	Adult Lisie	Short film
2012	Not That Funny	Christine	
2012	The Collection	Abby	
2012	Alphas	Kat	Main Cast; Season 2
2012	Doonby	Lucy Mae	
2012	Castle	Audrey	Episode: "The Final Frontier"
2013	Grimm	Jocelyn	Episode: "Endangered"
2013	Absence	Liz	
2013	Grey's Anatomy	Donna Woods	Episode: "I Bet It Stung"
2013	Agents of S.H.I.E.L.D.	Petra Larsen	Episode: "The Well"
2014	The Mentalist	Avery Schultz	Episode: "The Golden Hammer"
2014	Warehouse 13	Katarina	Episode: "A Faire to Remember"
2016	Supernatural	Michelle Tilghman	Episode: "Red Meat"
2016–2017	Colony	Lindsey	Recurring Role; 11 Episodes
2017-2018	NCIS: Los Angeles	Special Agent Zoe Morris	Two episodes: "Battle Scars" and "Where Everybody Knows Your Name"
2017	The Handmaid's Tale	Erin	Four episodes
2017	The Gifted	Shelia	Episode: "EXodus"
