= The Little Vampire (film) =

2000 film

- German theatrical release poster
- Directed by: Uli Edel
- Screenplay by: Karey Kirkpatrick; Larry Wilson
- Based on: Der kleine Vampir by Angela Sommer-Bodenburg
- Produced by: Richard Claus
- Starring: Jonathan Lipnicki; Richard E. Grant; Jim Carter; Alice Krige; Pamela Gidley; Tommy Hinkley; Anna Popplewell; Dean Cook; Rollo Weeks; John Wood
- Cinematography: Bernd Heinl
- Edited by: Peter R. Adam
- Music by: Nigel Clarke; Michael Csanyi-Willis
- Production companies: Cometstone Pictures; Stonewood Communications
- Distributed by: Warner Bros. Pictures (Germany); Independent Films (Netherlands); New Line Cinema (Select territories)
- Release dates: August 18, 2000 (Edinburgh Film Festival); September 28, 2000 (Germany); October 27, 2000 (United States)
- Running time: 95 minutes
- Countries: Germany; Netherlands; United States
- Language: English
- Budget: $35 million
- Box office: $28 million

The Little Vampire is a 2000 dark fantasy film loosely based on the children's book series by German writer Angela Sommer-Bodenburg, about Tony Thompson, a boy who tries to save young vampire Rudolph Sackville-Bagg and his family from ruthless vampire hunter Rookery. It was directed by Uli Edel and written by Karey Kirkpatrick and Larry Wilson. The film stars Jonathan Lipnicki, Rollo Weeks, Richard E. Grant, Jim Carter and Alice Krige.

The film was first released in Germany on September 28, 2000, by Warner Bros. under their Family Entertainment label and in the US on October 27 by New Line Cinema.

== Plot ==
Nine-year-old Tony Thompson moves with his family from California to Scotland, where they take up residence in a small castle while his father Bob is employed building a golf course on the estate of Lord McAshton. In his new home, Tony starts experiencing nightmares about vampires and a mysterious comet. Things are not any better for him at school, as he gets picked on by Lord McAshton's grandsons Flint and Nigel.

One night, while dressed up as a vampire, Tony is mistaken for one by the young vampire Rudolph Sackville-Bagg, who is on the run from Rookery, an evil vampire hunter. After realizing that Tony is not a vampire, Rudolph tries to attack him but ultimately fails due to being weakened by Rookery. After trying to leave through flying out the window, Rudolph falls from the sky due to his weakness. Tony helps Rudolph find a cow to feed from and in return, Rudolph takes Tony flying. The two boys quickly become friends and Rudolph confides to Tony that his family only drinks animal blood and wish to become human. Rudolph reveals that they are searching for a magical amulet that can be used to turn vampires into humans but Rookery is also seeking the amulet to send all vampires to Hell. When Rudolph takes Tony to the cemetery where his family lives, they are confronted by Rudolph's parents Frederick and Freda, Rudolph's romantic sister Anna and rebellious teen brother Gregory. Frederick doubts Tony's loyalty to Rudolph but when Tony helps repel an attack from Rookery, Frederick begrudgingly allows Tony to help them but warns him not to betray him and the rest of the vampire clan to Rookery. Tony and Rudolph then proceed to get revenge on Flint and Nigel.

Rookery alerts Lord McAshton to the presence of vampires in the village. Lord McAshton reveals that his family has known about the existence of vampires for generations. Elizabeth, an ancestor of Lord McAshton, was romantically involved with Rudolph's uncle Von, who was the last known holder of the amulet, and both lovers were killed by the McAshtons. Learning this, Tony, Rudolph and Anna seek out Elizabeth's tomb, where Tony experiences a vision pointing out the location of the amulet: Tony's own bedroom. Rudolph and Tony race Rookery to the amulet while the rest of Rudolph's family, along with Bob and Tony's mother Dottie, travel to the site of the ritual the vampires hope to perform. After a chase, Tony and Rudolph manage to escape with the amulet while Rookery inadvertently drives his truck over a cliff after getting entangled in a blimp.

Tony and Rudolph succeed in bringing Frederick the amulet but the ceremony is interrupted by Rookery, who returns riding the blimp. The vampires are unable to stand against Rookery's glowing cross but Dottie and Bob defend them and defeat Rookery, pushing him off a cliff to his apparent death. Tony completes the ceremony by wishing for the vampires to become human. Rudolph and his family disappear as the comet passes, leaving Tony, Bob and Dottie alone and unsure if the ceremony succeeded. Some time later, while visiting the village market, Tony spots Rudolph and his family, now human, moving into a house in the village. At first they seem not to recognize Tony but as Tony does the whistle to them their memories return and the friends are reunited.

== Cast ==
- Jonathan Lipnicki as Tony Thompson, a 9-year-old boy who becomes friends with Rudolph.
- Rollo Weeks as Rudolph Sackville-Bagg, younger brother of Gregory, middle child of Frederick Sackville-Bagg and Freda Sackville-Bagg and the second nephew of Von Sackville-Bagg.
- Richard E. Grant as Frederick Sackville-Bagg, Gregory, Anna and Rudolph's father, Freda's husband, and the oldest brother of Von Sackville-Bagg, and the leader of the Scotland Vampire Clan.
- Jim Carter as Rookery, a ruthless vampire hunter and the main villain of the film.
- Alice Krige as Freda Sackville-Bagg, Gregory, Anna and Rudolph's mother, Frederick's wife, Von Sackville-Bagg's sister-in-law and the matriarch of the Sackville-Bagg family.
- Pamela Gidley as Dottie Thompson, Tony's mother and Bob's wife.
- Tommy Hinkley as Bob Thompson, Tony's father and Dottie's husband.
- John Wood as Lord McAshton, Bob's boss, and Nigel and Flint's grandfather.
- Anna Popplewell as Anna Sackville-Bagg, Gregory and Rudolph's younger sister and the only daughter of Frederick Sackville-Bagg and Freda Sackville-Bagg she's the niece of Von Sackville Bagg and Tony's love interest.
- Dean Cook as Gregory Sackville-Bagg, Anna and Rudolph's older brother and the oldest child of Frederick Sackville-Bagg and Freda Sackville-Bagg he is the nephew of Von Sackville-Bagg. He is the only member of the Scotland Vampire Clan who makes vampire noises instead of speech.
- Ed Stoppard as Von Sackville-Bagg, Gregory, Anna and Rudolph's uncle, Frederick's younger brother and Freda's brother-in-law.
- Jake D'Arcy as Farmer McLaughlin
- Iain De Caestecker as Nigel McAshton, one of Lord McAshton's grandsons who picks on Tony at school.
- Scott Fletcher as Flint McAshton, one of Lord McAshton's grandsons who also picks on Tony at school.
- Johnny Meres as Teacher
- Georgie Glen as Babysitter Lorna
- Elizabeth Berrington as Elizabeth McAshton, Von Sackville Bagg's wife, Fredrick's sister-in-law, Gregory, Rudolph and Anna's aunt.
- Harry Jones as Caretaker

== Production ==
Parts of the film were shot on farmland near Cockburnspath in Berwickshire in the Scottish Borders, Culross and nearby Dunimarle Castle in Fife, Newliston House, Dalmeny House and Dundas Castle near Edinburgh, Gosford House in East Lothian and on roads in West Lothian around Oatridge, near Broxburn. The school to which the Tony Thompson (Jonathan Lipnicki) goes is Low Port Primary School in Linlithgow West Lothian.

== Soundtrack ==
Music from and Inspired by The Little Vampire

Soundtrack album by various artists
- Released: October 17, 2000
- Recorded: 1999–2000
- Genre: Pop
- Length: 42:00
- Label: New Line

Singles from Music from and Inspired by The Little Vampire
- 1. "Shalala Lala" Released: February 23, 2000

Soundtrack
Review scores
Source	Rating
Allmusic	3/5 stars

A soundtrack for the film, titled Music from and Inspired by The Little Vampire, was released on October 17, 2000, by New Line Records. Dutch Eurodance group Vengaboys released the song "Shalala Lala" as a single and it is included in the soundtrack album.

Track listing
No.	Title	Writer(s)	Artist	Length
1.	"Iko Iko"	James Crawford; Jesse Thomas; Sharon Jones; Joan Marie Johnson; Rosa Lee Hawkins; Joe Jones; Barbara Anne Hawkins; Marilyn Jones	Aaron Carter	2:41
2.	"Gimme! Gimme! Gimme! (A Man After Midnight)"	Benny Andersson; Björn Ulvaeus	A*Teens	3:54
3.	"Let's Get Funky Tonite"	Kevin Clark; Berny Cosgrove	Dream Street	3:15
4.	"Best Friends"	Via; Anthony Mazza; Sundafu Kawah	Angela Via	3:20
5.	"You Can Get It"	Desmond Child; Herschel Small	Baha Men	4:16
6.	"Let Your Soul Shine"	Tobias Lindell; Peter Bjorklund; Joel Eriksson	Bosson	3:16
7.	"Shalala Lala"	Torben Lendager; Poul Dehnhardt	Vengaboys	3:33
8.	"Here I Am"	Herbie Crichlow; Calanit Ledani; Nadir Khayat	No Authority	3:39
9.	"Flee Fly Flo"	Nicolas Graham; Deni Lew	Fe-m@il	2:49
10.	"Reason I Live"	Young	Ace Young	5:02
11.	"Cool in the Wind"	Reiss	Michael Reiss	2:57
12.	"Requiem (The Fifth)"	Traditional	Trans-Siberian Orchestra	2:58

== Reception ==
The film was a box-office disappointment, grossing $28 million against its $35 million budget.

=== Critical ===
On the review aggregator website Rotten Tomatoes, 56% of 63 critics' reviews are positive. The website's consensus reads: "The Little Vampire can't seem to find the right pitch, with its muddled, jumpy script and badly executed mix of cuteness and fright."Metacritic, which uses a weighted average, assigned the film a score of 45 out of 100, based on 24 critics, indicating "mixed or average" reviews. Audiences polled by CinemaScore gave the film an average grade of "B+" on an A+ to F scale.

Lawrence Van Gelder of The New York Times gave it a positive review, and called the film "literate, clever, mischievous and just plain fun". Roger Ebert gave the film two stars out of four, saying that "the movie has first-rate credits, from the director Uli Edel (Last Exit to Brooklyn) to the writers Karey Kirkpatrick (James and the Giant Peach) and Larry Wilson (Beetlejuice), to the cast (Lipnicki played the kid in Jerry Maguire and Stuart Little). The costumes are neat, the photography is great--all the pieces are on hand, but they don't fit".

Michael Thomson for the BBC gave the film three stars, questioning the tone but remarking: "Yet the basic idea which drives this jolly film, along with Lipnicki's charm, is sometimes almost enough". Jan Stuart for The Los Angeles Times praised most of the cast but criticized Lipnicki and said: "Older kids and grown-ups looking for more sophisticated humor will have to content themselves with a running gag about vampire cows, which could have been funnier than Edel makes it here". Angela Sommer-Bodenburg, author of the original The Little Vampire book series, found the film to be beautiful, atmospheric, funny, clever and well-made but she criticized the film's ending in which the vampires become human again, as the tragedy of the vampires in her books lies especially in their inability to become human again.

=== Accolades ===
In 2001, the film received the German Film Award as Best Children's Film. Jonathan Lipnicki was nominated at the 27th Saturn Awards for Best Performance by a Younger Actor. Lipnicki and Rollo Weeks were both also nominated at the 22nd Young Artist Awards, Lipnicki for Best Performance in a Feature Film: Young Actor Age Ten or Under and Weeks for Best Performance in a Feature Film: Supporting Young Actor.

Award	Category	Recipient/Nominee	Result
Young Artist Award	Best Performance in a Feature Film: Young Actor Age Ten or Under	Jonathan Lipnicki	Nominated
Young Artist Award	Best Performance in a Feature Film: Supporting Young Actor	Rollo Weeks	Nominated
Saturn Awards	Best Performance by a Younger Actor	Jonathan Lipnicki	Nominated
German Film Award	Best Children's Film		Won

== Animated adaptation ==
In 2017, an animated film called The Little Vampire 3D was released. The film is loosely based on the 2000 live-action film and was produced, written, and directed by Richard Claus (producer of the live-action film), among others. Besides having thematical similarities, Jim Carter and Alice Krige also reprised their roles as Rookery and Freda Sackville-Bagg.

== See also ==
- Der kleine Vampir, the book series on which the TV series and the film are based
- The Little Vampire, a TV series also based on the same book series
- Young Dracula
