= I Heart Vampires =

- Promotional image for the second season
- Also known as: I <3 Vampires
- Created by: Take180
- Written by: Julie Restivo; Kate Feldman
- Directed by: Oren Kaplan; Shaun Peterson
- Starring: Cherilyn Wilson; Erin Way; Adam Chambers; Alli Kinzel; Josh Nuncio; Martha Hackett
- Country of origin: United States
- No. of episodes: 42; 19 Bonus Episodes

Production
- Producer: Take180
- Running time: 180 seconds

Original release
- Network: Take180; YouTube
- Release: March 19, 2009 – June 4, 2010

Related
- My Alibi; In2ition; Electric Spoofaloo; My Date

I Heart Vampires (Often stylized as I <3 Vampires) is a web series produced by Take180 (a subsidiary of The Walt Disney Company). The series consists of a first season of 22 episodes which ran from March 19, 2009, until September 11, 2009, a second season of 20 episodes which premiered on January 28, 2010, as well as two derivative series that run concurrently with the second season, and concluded on June 4, 2010. The series is well received, and is the first non-variety sketch show on the site to make it past a first season. The show, like many on the site, took fan submissions and integrated them into each episode.

== Plot ==
The show is a parody of the fandom that surrounds popular vampire franchises like Twilight.

=== Season One ===
Corbin and Luci, two best friends, run "I <3 Vampires" - a fansite for their favorite book, Confessions of a High School Vampire, for which Corbin makes daily vlogs regarding the book series. When Luci receives an anonymous e-mail containing the first six chapters of the upcoming book in the Confessions series (derived from the online leak of part of the fifth Twilight book, Midnight Sun), the best friends are so excited that Corbin posts the chapters on "I <3 Vampires" without thinking about the consequences. When the books' author, Siona McCabre, learns that chapters of her new book have been leaked, and announces that she has halted the publication of the book indefinitely, Corbin and Luci take it upon themselves to find Siona and apologize, hoping that Siona will continue with the book's publication. With the help of Corbin's annoying neighbour, Wyatt, the three go on a quest to find Siona, which proves to be more difficult - and much more complicated - than they had originally thought.

=== Season Two ===
A year ago, Corbin and Luci found out that their favorite book, Confessions of a High School Vampire, was more real than they ever could have imagined. Now the two are no longer friends, and have abandoned "I <3 Vampires," the fansite they created for Confessions. They have also broken up with their supernatural boyfriends, Nick and Wyatt, and so Corbin is surprised when Siona McCabre, author of Confessions and mother to Corbin's ex-boyfriend Nick, asks Corbin to help her find Nick, who has been missing for several weeks. Corbin refuses. Three days later, Corbin learns that Siona has been killed, and so she makes her first vlog since abandoning "I <3 Vampires," in which she apologizes for leaving the fansite without an explanation. Corbin then goes missing, and it's up to her college roommate, Confessions fan Sam, to reunite Luci and Wyatt so that the three of them can find Corbin together.

== Hiatus and Series Future ==
At the conclusion of the second season there was not any news on whether or not there would be a third season. Cherilyn Wilson and Alli Kinzel later stated in a YouTube video that there would not be another season coming in the foreseeable future as they have not been contacted about continuing the series, despite high fan demand. On June 15, Josh Nuncio announced on Twitter that both seasons with cast commentary and alternate endings would be available on Amazon.com.

== Book ==
In 2011, Disney Publishing Worldwide published I Heart Vampires: Birth (A Confessions of a High School Vampire Novel) which was written by Siona McCabre. It is the same book that Corbin and Luci read in the series. The book is about the student Noah Vance who discovers two bite marks in a morning after a high school party. He realizes that he is turning into a vampire.

== Cast ==
- Cherilyn Wilson as Corbin
- Erin Way as Luci
- Adam Chambers as Wyatt
- Alli Kinzel as Sam
- Josh Nuncio as Nick McCabre
- Martha Hackett as Siona McCabre
- Sarah Butler as Paige
- Hayley J Williams as Aradia
- Ross Marquand as Siona's Publicist
- Ian Fisher as Victor

== Awards and nominations ==
=== Awards ===
Webby Awards:

- 2010: Online Film & Video Best Use of Interactive Video (T180 Studios / The Walt Disney Company)

=== Nominations ===
Streamy Award:

- 2010: Best Interactive Experience in a Web Series (T180 Studios / The Walt Disney Company)

== See also ==
- Vampire film
- List of vampire television series
