= Larry Wilson (screenwriter) =

American screenwriter (born 1948)

- Born: San Bernardino, California, U.S.
- Occupation: Screenwriter
- Years active: 1986–present

Larry Wilson is an American screenwriter. He is best known for his screenwriting work on the films Beetlejuice (1988) and The Addams Family (1991). He also co-wrote the films The Little Vampire (2000) and, for television, The Year Without a Santa Claus (2006). He co-wrote the animated version of The Little Vampire 3-D (2017) and co-wrote the animated film Ainbo (2020). He also wrote and directed a number of episodes of the Tales from the Crypt television series from 1991 to 1996.

Wilson served as an executive producer on Beetlejuice Beetlejuice, and shares a 'Characters Created By' credit with Michael McDowell (2024).

He shares 'Story By' credits with Michael McDowell on the Tony nominated Beetlejuice Musical, now on a world-wide tour, after a two-year run on Broadway (2019–2024).

He is also developing his original screenplay Loose Spooks, described as "a sci-fi comedy with a supernatural edge." (2023)

He served as co-writer and executive producer on TEETHING PROBLEMS - a short film described as "a dark comedy-fantasy." (2024)
