= Hayley J Williams =

British actress

Hayley Joann Williams (born in Cheshire, England) is a British actress. She has performed on stage, in film and on television. She may be best known for roles in various horror and SF movies. Hayley played the leading role of Dr. Martinelli in the feature film "Triassic World" – an ambition driven lead scientist who will stop at nothing to revolutionize medical science.

Previously, Hayley received acclaim for her portrayal of Marie Dumont in the supernatural thriller "The Shadow Within", in which she starred alongside Beth Winslet. She was awarded Best Actress awards at the B Movie Festival in New York and the Los Angeles Short Film Festival (for a short film version of the feature) for her work.

In keeping with her love of SF genre material, additional projects include a three episode arc on Disney's internet sensation, the web series "Love Vampires", and "Embers of the Sky", a triptych of science fiction films about searching for peace in fantastical worlds that recently premiered at the Action on Film Festival. One of Hayley's favorite roles thus far was as a woman possessed in "The Exorcism Diaries".

Hayley's voice over work includes commercials for Amazon Kindle UK, Mastercard, Hästens Beds, Audi and Technicolor. She is also experienced in documentary narration, video games and radio drama. Hayley played the role of 'Sian Pearce' in the BBC Radio Drama Torchwood: The Lost Files. In her episode, "The Devil and Miss Carew", Hayley had the pleasure of working alongside Torchwood cast members John Barrowman and Eve Myles.

Williams has toured the UK in various theater productions during her professional career, and received positive reviews for her role in The Coma at the Edinburgh Festival Fringe. She trained at Drama Studio London. As of December 2009, she was living in Los Angeles, California.

== Partial filmography ==
- The Shadow Within – Marie Dumont (2007)
- Since: A Sci Fi Short Film (short film) – Sina Lee (voice) (2010)
- Embers of the Sky – Kariney Quall/The Susurro (all three short film segments) (2010)
- Mummy's Boy (short film) – Cathy (2010)
- I <3 Vampires (TV series) – Aradia (3 episodes)
- Incidental Weekend – Charlie (2011)
- Holiday Road – Crystal (segment "September") (2012)
