= Endangered (Grimm) =

- Grimm episode
- Episode no.: Season 2 Episode 19
- Directed by: David Straiton
- Written by: Spiro Skentzos
- Cinematography by: Marshall Adams
- Editing by: Chris Willingham
- Production code: 219
- Original air date: April 30, 2013
- Running time: 42 minutes

Guest appearances
- Eric Tiede as Vincent; Erin Way as Jocelyn; Sharon Sachs as Dr. Harper

Episode chronology
← Previous "Volcanalis"	Next → "Kiss of the Muse"
- Grimm season 2

"Endangered" is the 19th episode of season 2 of the supernatural drama television series Grimm and the 41st episode overall, which premiered on April 30, 2013, on NBC. The episode was written by Spiro Skentzos, and was directed by David Straiton. The episode and the rest of the episodes of the season were broadcast on Tuesday nights.

== Plot ==
Opening quote: "They'll kill you, and I'll be here in the woods all alone and abandoned."

A man finds mutilated cows in a field and is confronted by a glowing blue skinned Wesen, who inadvertently kills him by pushing him into a fence post. His friend, Robert Hadley (David Bodin) finds him and sees the Wesen escape. Nick (David Giuntoli) meets with Monroe (Silas Weir Mitchell) to discuss the key and Monroe discovers the key could lead to a site in the Black Forest in Germany.

The Wesen is a Glühenvolk named Vincent (Eric Tiede), who has been mutilating cows to feed their ovaries to his pregnant wife, Jocelyn (Erin Way). Nick asks Renard (Sasha Roiz) about the key's importance. Renard explains that the Royal Families have 4 keys out of 7 needed and are setting out to find Nick's key and the location of the other two, which will lead to a map with something everyone is desperate to find.

Nick and Wu (Reggie Lee) investigate the killing, with Hadley stating the Wesen was an alien. The incident catches the attention of George Lazure (Mark Fullerton), who claims to be a ufologist. While Nick and Wu find a piece of the skin of the Wesen, Lazure seems to know about the incident and manages to identify the "alien" from a witness. Nick learns from the police forensic doctor that the skin contains luciferase, which can make its skin glow.

Juliette (Bitsie Tulloch) is worrying that her memories are straining her relationship with Nick. She visits Monroe, where she asks him the meaning of Grimm. Not giving details, he explains that Nick sees things that other people can't. Nick asks Rosalee (Bree Turner) about the Glühenvolk. She says that the species was thought to be extinct and the cow mutilations signal that their ovaries served for a birth. Nick decides to help the Glühenvolk couple as they could face extinction. They also discover that Lazure is in fact a Wesen hunter and also a Raub-Kondor. Lazure has a gun that fires bullets that contain a drug that kills Wesen but keeps them in their Wesen form for several hours after death. This is to allow him to skin the Glühenvolk while they are woged. The skin is valuable.

Lazure is now following Vincent and Jocelyn to a cottage, but Nick, Monroe and Rosalee get there first. Rosalee helps her give birth. Lazure arrives just after the baby is born. Nick kills him with his own gun while still he is woged. Vincent and Jocelyn leave for Alaska, where many Glühenvolk are residing. Knowing he is still woged, Nick calls the police to find his corpse, shocking them at first sight. He then woges back to his normal form.

== Reception ==
=== Viewers ===
The episode was viewed by 5.77 million people, earning a 1.9/5 in the 18-49 rating demographics on the Nielson ratings scale, ranking first on its timeslot and sixth for the night in the 18-49 demographics, behind New Girl, Hell's Kitchen, NCIS: Los Angeles, NCIS, and The Voice. This was an 18% increase in viewership from the previous episode, which was watched by 4.85 million viewers with a 1.3/4. This means that 1.3 percent of all households with televisions watched the episode, while 5 percent of all households watching television at that time watched it. With DVR factoring in, the episode was watched by 8.67 million viewers with a 3.1 ratings share in the 18-49 demographics.

=== Critical reviews ===
"Endangered" received positive reviews. The A.V. Club's Kevin McFarland gave the episode a "B−" grade and wrote, "'Endangered' doesn’t go for the alien abduction or invasion story. Instead, Grimm goes for the rare-and-valuable-endangered-species-on-the-run-and-about-to-have-a-baby plot, mixed with a hunter in disguise. It's a familiar arc, but Bree Turner and Silas Weir Mitchell's performances, amazed and curious with ever-improving chemistry, sell it well. The creatures, who turn glowing blue when agitated thanks to a hormone for bioluminescence (I haven't seen Avatar in a long time, so my below-rudimentary knowledge of this part of biochemistry is practically nonexistent), are on the run from Nebraska, aiming to get to Alaska to meet up with more of their kind. But the female, Jocelyn, is very close to giving birth, leading her partner Vincent with no choice but to mutilate cows in order to harvest their ovaries to feed his partner."

Nick McHatton from TV Fanatic, gave a 4.0 star rating out of 5, stating: "'Endangered' was one of the better installments to introduce new viewers this far into the season, thanks a mostly predominant procedural case and light, easy to follow serial elements."

Shilo Adams from TV Overmind, wrote: "So, aliens, you guys. This episode was, as expected, pretty silly, but I kind of liked it? It was a different enough case of the week that I wasn't bored and my love for Erin Way (RIP Alphas) certainly didn't hurt anything. Plus, I appreciated the recap of the whole key business, Juliette finally coming around, and Renard continuing to be a pretty good ally for Nick."
