= The Little Vampire 3D =

2017 animated children's vampire film

- Dutch theatrical release poster
- Directed by: Richard Claus; Karsten Kiilerich
- Written by: Script: Richard Claus; Larry Wilson
- Produced by: Richard Claus; Chris Brouwer
- Edited by: Job ter Burg
- Music by: Vidjay Beerepoot
- Production companies: First Look; Comet Film; A. Film
- Distributed by: Entertainment One Benelux (Netherlands and Belgium); Universum Film Buena Vista International (Germany); SF Studios (Denmark); Universal Pictures Home Entertainment (United States)
- Release date: 5 October 2017 (Netherlands)
- Running time: 82 minutes
- Countries: Netherlands; Germany; Denmark
- Languages: Dutch; English
- Budget: $10 million
- Box office: $13.8 million

The Little Vampire 3D (Dutch: De Kleine Vampier 3D) also known as The Little Vampire, is a 2017 3D animated vampire film directed by Richard Claus and Karsten Kiilerich, loosely based on the 2000 live-action film of the same name and based on the characters of the children's book series of the same name by German writer Angela Sommer-Bodenburg.

== Plot ==
While on holiday with his parents, 13-years old Tony Thompson meets Rudolph Sackville-Bagg, a vampire. Tony has had nightmares about vampires, and Rudi has been brought up to think of all mortals as heartless killers - but they become friends due to childish curiosity and a lack of anybody else their equivalent age.

Rudi's clan have been tracked by Vampire hunter Rookery and with the exception of his parents and sister Anna are all imprisoned in a crypt which Rookery intends on blowing up to kill them all. Tony is captured by Rookery, but manages to outwit them and escape, having now learned of their plan he decides to try and stop him. Anna enchants Tony's parents, allowing the vampires to use the Thompson's caravan to travel to the crypt during daylight hours while Rudi and Tony fly ahead. They spot Rookery and Tony manages to steal his unique spanner that will allow him to undo the bolts on the crypt prison. While trying to unlock the crypt Rookery and his sidekick Maney ambush him but he is saved by the timely arrival of Gregory - Rudi's older brother - who has escaped the crypt through a crack in the ceiling. Together they defeat both Rookery and Maney, but it is implied that Maney has had enough of Rookery's abuse and leaves him to the vampires. The clan escape the crypt, but the bomb still goes off destroying it, leaving the clan nowhere to live or stay during daylight hours. Tony and Rudi suggest that the vampires check in to the Bed and breakfast the Thompsons were staying at at the beginning of the film, much to the B&B owner's horror.

== Cast ==
- Jim Carter as Rookery
- Rasmus Hardiker as Rudolph Sackville-Bagg and Gregory Sackville-Bagg
- Alice Krige as Freda Sackville-Bagg
- Tim Pigott-Smith as Frederick Sackville-Bagg
- Miriam Margolyes as Wulftrud
- Matthew Marsh as Gernot
- Joseph Kloska as Maney
- Phoebe Givron-Taylor as Anna Sackville-Bagg
- Amy Saville as Tony Thompson

== Production ==
The film is a Dutch-German-Danish co-production by First Look, Comet Film and A. Film in association with Cool Beans, Telescreen and Rothkirch Cartoon Film. While much of the film´s animation was done at A. Film, Studio Rakete and Ambient Entertainment handled some parts of the animation and character modeling alongside the final result for the film, as the visual effects, compositing, stereoscopics and color grading are handled by Storm Post Production.

The United Kingdom theatrical and DVD versions were cut by 29 seconds in order to remove a scene involving electricity in order to achieve a U rating from the BBFC. Jim Carter and Alice Krige reprised their roles from the 2000 live-action adaptation of The Little Vampire.

== Release ==
The film had its world premiere in the Netherlands on 5 October 2017. It was released in Germany, Denmark and Italy on 26 October, and in the United Kingdom on 25 May 2018. It received 19,767 admissions in Danish cinemas, and had a worldwide gross of $13,808,590.

The film received generally negative reviews from critics, and on review aggregator Rotten Tomatoes the film holds a score of 14% based on 14 critical reviews, indicating a "rotten" score.
