= The Little Vampire (TV series) =

Canadian-German children's television series

- Also known as: Der kleine Vampir
- Written by: Richard Nielsen; Angela Sommer-Bodenburg
- Directed by: René Bonnière
- Starring: Joel Dacks; Gert Fröbe; Christopher Stanton; Marsha Moreau; Michael Gough; Jim Gray
- Opening theme: "They Can See in the Dark", performed by Jim Gray
- Ending theme: "They Can See in the Dark" (instrumental)
- Composer: John Mills-Cockell
- Countries of origin: Canada; Germany; United Kingdom
- Original language: English
- No. of seasons: 1
- No. of episodes: 13

Production
- Executive producers: Tony Allard; Anna Home; John Ross; Nic Wry; Frithjof Zeidler
- Producer: Richard Nielsen
- Production locations: Edmonton, Alberta, Canada
- Editor: Doug Forbes
- Running time: 25 min
- Production companies: Norflicks (Canada); Allarcom (Canada); Polyphon (Germany); TVS (United Kingdom)

Original release
- Release: 1986 – 1987

Related
- Der kleine Vampir – Neue Abenteuer

The Little Vampire (German-language version title: Der kleine Vampir) is a children's television series created in 1985 (first aired in 1986) by the German Polyphon Film- und Fernsehgesellschaft, TVS (United Kingdom) and Canadian Norflicks Productions Ltd. The series is based upon the books written by Angela Sommer-Bodenburg.

== Synopsis ==
Anton Besker is a 10-year-old boy who suddenly meets a boy, named Rüdiger, in his bedroom. Although Rüdiger seems to be the same age as Anton, he claims to be a 146-year-old vampire. Rüdiger explains a vampire can choose his age when he mutates. They then stay this age forever. He and his sister Anna chose to be children as Anna was afraid to not have teeth. He and his sister live in a hidden crypt on the old part of the local cemetery.

Anton and Rüdiger become friends but can only meet after sunset and before sunrise. Initially, they enjoy flying. Flying is not a vampire ability but they are able to fly by using a "flying powder" called "rants". Any cloth on which flying powder is sprinkled will fly and carry anything that is attached to it. For security reasons, the flying powder should only be used on vampire cloaks. Anton can fly by wearing such a cloak and sprinkling flying powder on it.

There are a few important rules:

- Anton must not reveal that vampires do exist, although he writes all his adventures in letters that he sends to his friend Teddy who moved out of town some weeks before. Teddy however thinks the adventures are tales made up by Anton.
- Other vampires, except Anna and Lumpi, must not know Anton is a human.
- Vampires must hide from vampire hunters such as Johann Geiermeier, the caretaker of the local cemetery.

In the story, Geiermeier is hunting the vampires and has a plan to destroy them. Thanks to Anton, the vampires escape.

== Cast ==
German	English	Actor
Anton Bohnsack	Anton Besker	Christopher Stanton
Rüdiger von Schlotterstein	Rüdiger von Schlotterstein	Joel Dacks
Onkel Theodor von Schlotterstein	Uncle Ludwig von Schlotterstein	Michael Gough
Tante Dorothee von Schlotterstein	Aunt Hildegard von Schlotterstein	Lynn Seymour
Anna von Schlotterstein	Anna Irmgard von Schlotterstein	Marsha Moreau
Lumpi von Schlotterstein	Lumpi von Schlotterstein	Jim Gray
Johann Geiermeier	Johann Gurrmeyer	Gert Fröbe
Udo Schäfer	Cyril Schaeffer	Kristofer Kent
Helga Bohnsack	Helga Besker	Susan Hogan
Robert Bohnsack	Robert Besker	Michael Hogan
Effie Puvogel	Effie Perkins	Cathy Wenschlag
Frau Puvogel	Mrs. Perkins	Barbara Reese
Teddy Kasper	Teddy Cuthbert	

== Episodes ==
1. "Nächtlicher Besuch" (A visit at night)

The little vampire Rüdiger is bored, and his Uncle Theodor/Ludwig sends him to town. There, Rüdiger sees Anton at the sports centre. Anton is just picked up by his mother whom he tells he is bored since his friend Teddy moved out of town. Rüdiger follows them so he knows where they live: the penthouse of an apartment building. Some time later, Rüdiger knocks on Anton's bedroom window. Anton, first afraid, disarrays his room trying to drive Rüdiger away; this makes a noise which is heard by Mrs. Perkins, the babysitter (as his parents Helga and Robert had to go to a party). The sitter takes a look in Anton's bedroom, but Rüdiger is able to hide in time. Anton's fear passes away and the two become good friends. At end of the episode, Johann Geiermeier arrives by plane. He is the new caretaker of the local cemetery as well as a vampire hunter.

2. "Fliegen will gelernt sein" (Flying you should learn)

As Helga and Robert go to a party, Anton invited Rüdiger to his bedroom, but Helga wrenched her ankle and should stay in bed. Rüdiger has a surprise: Anton will learn how to fly. Anton is first afraid he will be mutated into a vampire, but Rüdiger explains everyone can fly by using a smelly "flying powder". They practise in the bedroom, but Anton throws over some stuff. This is heard by Helga who enters the bedroom. Rüdiger is able to hide in time. Helga finds the cloak worn by Anton. He explains the cloak belongs to a friend who came over and forgot to take it with him. Vampire hunter Johann Geiermeier moves into his new house (Helga being the real estate agent). While he plays the tuba, uncle Theodor/Ludwig spies on him.

3. "Bei Schlottersteins" (At the Schlottersteins)

At dawn the next morning, Uncle Theoder/Ludwig says he is 100% sure the new caretaker is a Geiermeier. He acts as a Geiermeier, is dressed like a Geiermeier, smells like a Geiermeier and presented himself as a Geiermeier during a phone conversation.

That night, Anton's parents have to go out again. As his usual sitter is ill, she sends over her daughter Effie Perkins. Rüdiger scares Effie who runs out of the penthouse. Rüdiger takes Anton to his crypt. At the cemetery, they just avoid being caught by Geiermeier. Once in the crypt, aunt Dorothee/Hildegard wakes up. Anton hides in Rüdiger's coffin, although Dorothee/Hildegard can smell human flesh and suspects Rüdiger to have hidden a human in his coffin. Rüdiger distracts aunt Dorothee/Hildegard so Anton can escape.

Helga finds the smelly vampire cloak in Anton's room and takes it.

4. Vampirumhänge wäscht man nicht (Vampire cloaks should not be washed)

By the next morning, Helga has washed the cloak. She asks Anton to take the cloak to Rüdiger and to invite him and his sister for dinner. At the cemetery, Anton tries to fly in, but he does not succeed. His classmate Udo/Cyril is a witness and tries to figure out what Anton is doing. They are surprised by Geiermeier who recognizes the cloak as a vampire's. He interrogates Anton and Udo/Cyril about the cloak. Udo/Cyril escapes with the cloak to his house. At night Anton visits Rüdiger, who is upset that Anton lost the cloak. The good news is the cloak has been washed so the flying powder disappeared. Rüdiger visits a punk party where his cousin Lumpi, also a vampire, sings as lead of the staging group.

5. Annas Trick (Anna's trick)

Geiermeier sits behind his desk and writes his family chronicles. He describes the numerous disguises he used to find vampires. At last he had the splendid idea to become a gravedigger. At the same time, Rüdiger arrives at Anton's house. He is accompanied by his sister Anna. She will help to retrieve the cloak as Rüdiger has other things to do that night. Anna falls in love with Anton. Both go to Udo/Cyril. Whilst Anton keeps Udo/Cyril distracted, Anna slips into the house and retrieves the cloak: Anton had tricked Udo/Cyril to go into his room to make sure the cloak was still there, but Anna was watching.

When Anton enters his own bedroom, Anna is already there, having sprinkled flying powder over the cloak. When Helga is about to enter the bedroom, Anna hides and Anton puts the cloak under the bed. By doing this, some of the flying powder falls onto the duvet. After Helga leaves the room, the bedsheets (and Anton) start to fly. Thanks to Anna, Anton lands safely. Both go to the crypt to tell Rüdiger the cloak is back in possession. Anton is disappointed as it turns out Rüdiger is playing games with Lumpi. Suddenly, aunt Dorothee/Hildegard and uncle Theodor/Ludwig return. Anton hides in Rüdiger's coffin. When they are finally away, Anna finds an unconscious Anton and needs to perform a mouth to mouth resuscitation, which alarms Rüdiger into thinking she's biting Anton to make him a vampire. Some hours later, Helga finds a sleeping Anton beside the washing machine. Inside the machine the duvet from his bed.

6. Rüdiger in Jeans (Rüdiger in jeans)

It's almost the day where Rüdiger and Anna are expected at Anton's house. One major problem: Rüdiger and Anna can't go in their vampire clothes. The solution for Rüdiger is easy: Anton lends him some of his old clothes: jeans and a shirt. Anna remembers a dress she saw in Udo/Cyril's house. She decides to burgle the dress. Geiermeier finds a rare file in the library about vampires. As the file is not to be loaned, he steals it, but is caught and nearly charged by the police until he manages to escape with the file. Rüdiger and Anna dress up in the crypt and are about to go to Anton. They do not notice they are overheard by aunt Dorothee/Hildegard.

7. Tee mit Überraschungen (Tea with surprises)

Helga worries about the invitees. Rüdiger and Anna were to be expected at 4:00 p.m. but they only arrive after 8:00. Rüdiger and Anna wear human clothes and make-up to hide they are vampires. The whole party is witnessed by aunt Dorothee/Hildegard, uncle Theodor/Ludwig and Lumpi. While it is no surprise that Anna drinks milk, they believe both ate bread due to mimed chewing (although Anton quickly ate most of each sandwich), and Rüdiger is seen apparently drinking tea (it is consommé soup). Even Lumpi is shocked when he discovers Rüdiger consumes the regular human food.

Anton notices the spies and informs Anna and Rüdiger. Rüdiger is afraid they will be banished from the tomb and decides to go home. Robert insists he drive the children there by car. By directions of Rüdiger, Robert drops them off at a house near the cemetery. There, they are almost caught by Geiermeier but saved by Dorothee/Hildegard, Theodor/Ludwig and Lumpi. Once in the crypt, the interrogation starts: contact with humans should be avoided, none of them should know about vampires being real, and it is strictly forbidden to consume human food. Anna is dismissed as she still drinks milk. Rüdiger is banished from the tomb, stripped of his cloak (and thus the ability to fly) and must find another place to stay.

8. Rüdiger in Not (Rüdiger in peril)

Rüdiger has to spend that night outside, but by the next evening, he has arranged with Anton to have his coffin in the ground floor locker room at Anton's building. Rüdiger asks Anton to turn in his cloak so Rüdiger can fly to a place where he is not known. During this conversation Effie finds the cloak in Anton's room and takes it away. A few minutes later, Anton notices the theft and knows Effie is the wrongdoer. He goes to her appartment and finds the cloak wet in the bathtub. As a result, Rüdiger can't escape.

9. Unruhe im Keller (Troubles in the cellar)

Rüdiger is still hiding in Anton's cellar and is frequently visited by his sister Anna. She tells him that the family questions whether they made the correct decision or not. Anton has also borrowed the locker key and obtained a copy of it for Rüdiger. Anna gives Rüdiger some flying powder which she secretly took from the crypt.

Hearing that his father searches something in the locker, Anton rushes to help him (and prevent him from finding Rüdiger). He also finds an old newspaper with a photo of Anton and Teddy dressed up as vampires. Rüdiger learns Teddy now lives in Hamelin and flies over. There he finds Teddy, but decides not to introduce himself. Teddy is writing a letter to Anton which is taken away by Rüdiger. Rüdiger delivers the letter to Anton. Anton finishes the letter by telling Teddy everything he wrote is the truth.

Meanwhile, at the cemetary Geiermeier gives a speech towards the (hidden) vampires, promising them a fair trial in Transylvania. The police notice Geiermeier and bring him over to a psychiatric hospital, but Geiermeier is able to escape. As Anton sees about these events on TV news, he learns that the city plans to bulldoze the old cemetery.

10. Das große Fest der Vampire (The Big Vampire Party)

Anton wants to inform Rüdiger about the danger to the cemetery but Rüdiger refuses at this time to even hear such news, as the Big Vampire Party will take place next night. During the party all mistakes are forgiven. Anna brings over Rüdiger's cloak (as his fly prohibition has already ended) and invites Anton to the "Big Vampire Party"; she is disappointed when it turns out Rüdiger already invited Anton.

Anton dresses up as a vampire, when Udo/Cyril turns up. He has made his own cloak and wants learn how to fly. Anton takes him to the cemetery, where Udo/Cyril jumps from a gravestone and is picked up by the police whilst Anton escapes. He and Rüdiger fly to the party which takes place in a big cave. Rüdiger introduces Anton as "Thor the Awful". Anton gets to know Theodor/Ludwig, who turns out to be the king of the vampires, and Dorothee/Hildegard. Asked for his whereabouts, Anton answers: "I live where I drop my cloak", which Dorothee/Hildegard interprets as Anton being a gypsy, a folk which she admires. Although Theodor/Ludwig tells Rüdiger that he is forgiven, Rüdiger is reluctant to accept it, earning him his uncle's appreciation. Theodor/Ludwig gives a speech on forgiveness as "whatever happens, ought".

11. Geiermeier ist überall (Geiermeier is everywhere)

The party is still on. The vampires enjoy many different dance styles, including vampire-themed square dancing, and break dancing. Even Theodor/Ludwig delights in the modern dancing performances. Because he fell into water, Anton's make up is partially gone so he needs to leave as soon as possible. It is, however, inappropriate to leave early. Rüdiger tells his aunt that Thor is going to get his violin to play some songs for her. In the underground alleys they meet Geiermeier, trying to spy on the vampire party and stole a vampire cloak. To save Anton, they are forced to let Geiermeier escape but first retrieve the stolen cloak. Anton flies off and arrives home just before his parents return and has to sort things out with Udo/Cyril.

12. "Transportprobleme" (Transport problems)

Rüdiger still hides in the Beskers' locker. Anton informs him the demolition works started and the vampire family is in great danger. As it is day, Rüdiger can't help his family so Anton is forced to enter the crypt to tell the news. Once in the crypt he confesses not to be "Thor the Awful", but a regular human child. Theodor/Ludwig is about to kill Anton, but Anna persuades him to listen. Anton tells about the demolition. Theodor/Ludwig gives the task to hire a boat so they can escape the next night. Anton finds a captain (Bruno Gerussi) who is willing to carry the vampires.

13. Kein Abschied ist für immer (Farewell is not forever)

Back at the cemetary, Anton suggests using Halloween as a cover to transport their coffins to the boat. Lumpi calls his human punk friends to help carry. As they proceed calmly through the streets with their coffins, Geiermeier urges the police to stop them. A policeman points to Theodor/Ludwig, but Anton steps forward instead to be discovered to be human, at which point the attentive police officer recognizes Geiermeier as the escaped lunatic, so Geiermeier runs away. Anna, Rüdiger and Anton have to say farewell. Anton gets a present: a bottle of flying powder. Just before the ship leaves, Theodor/Ludwig notices one extra coffin. Inside he finds Geiermeier, who tries to come after the vampires. Theodor/Ludwig suggests he should give up his fight, as he is going to die sooner or later whilst vampires live forever whilst. Geiermeier instead talks about starting a family.

Teddy arrives on the train the next day to visit Anton. An "Everything is Forgiven" party is held at the Besker home. Later that night, Mr. Besker finds a letter on Anton's bedroom window: it is from Rüdiger telling he only lives one night's flying from Anton so they still can meet each other. To prove Anton's stories are real, he sprinkles flying powder on the bed sheets. Both boys fly on the sheets a few seconds later.

== Main differences from the books ==
- In the series, the crypt is inhabited by Rüdiger, Anna, Lumpi, aunt Dorothee and uncle Theodor. In the books, Rüdiger, Anna, Lumpi and Dorothee are joined by Rüdiger's parents ("Ludwig der Fürchterliche" and "Hildegard die Durstige") and his grandparents ("Sabine die Schreckliche" and "Wilhelm der Wüste"). Later on, Olga von Schlotterstein-Seifenschwein installs in the crypt.
- According to the books, uncle Theodor already was killed before the story starts. Theodor was caught by Geiermeier when he was playing the cards on his coffin. After the incident, the family moved to an underground secret crypt.
- In the books, Lumpi is the elder brother of Rüdiger and Anna. In the series he is their cousin, the son of Dorothee and cousin of Rüdiger and Anna.
- In the series, Uncle Theodor is king of the vampires. In the books, Count Dracula is the worldwide king. The leader of the German vampires is Elisabeth die Naschhafte. At end of the stories, she is followed up by Anna.
- In the series, Lumpi does have human friends, who are punks, allowing Lumpi to blend in. In the books, Lumpi is leader of a male vampire youth club.
- In the books, Anton, his father and grandfather have the same name: Anton Bohnsack.

== See also ==
- List of English-language Canadian television series
- List of German television series
- Vampire film
- List of vampire television series
