= Angela Sommer-Bodenburg =

German author of fantasy books for children

- Born: 18 December 1948 (age 77); Reinbek, British zone, Allied-occupied Germany
- Occupation: Novelist
- Writing career
- Genre: Fantasy
- Notable work: The Little Vampire series
- Website: www.angelasommer-bodenburg.com

Angela Sommer-Bodenburg (born December 18, 1948) is the author of a number of fantasy books for children. Her most famous contribution to the field of children's fantasy is The Little Vampire series, which has sold over 10 million copies and has been translated into over 30 languages. Sommer-Bodenburg states that her "vampire is not a bloodthirsty monster, however, but an affectionate little vampire with fears and foibles who will perhaps help free children of their own fears." The novel, written in 1979, spawned a series of books, and the plot has been adapted to theatre, radio, cinema, and television. A Canadian-German TV series was released in 1986 and a film version, directed by Uli Edel was released in 2000. Later a CG-animated film The Little Vampire 3D, directed by Richard Claus and Karsten Kiilerich, was released in 2017.

== Life and career ==
Sommer-Bodenburg was born in Reinbek, Germany. She studied education, philosophy, and sociology at the University of Hamburg. She was assistant master at intermediate and secondary school in Hamburg, West Germany from 1972 to 1984 and wrote the first chapter of The Little Vampire as an experiment to see what types of literature could hold the interest of her students. In 1984, she retired from teaching and dedicated herself to painting and writing. She has written more than forty books both for children and adults, from poetry to novels. She calls the success of the Little Vampire series a "mixed blessing" to her career as an author, stating on her website: "I was pigeon-holed as the author of children's books and, within this pigeon-hole, I was further classified as the author of vampire books."

She moved to Rancho Santa Fe, California, in 1992 after visiting the production company, Propaganda Films, in Hollywood that wished to make the film version of The Little Vampire. In 2004, she moved to Silver City, New Mexico.

== Bibliography ==
=== English ===
==== The Little Vampire series ====
The first five books of Sommer-Bodenburg's debut series (original German title: Der kleine Vampir), when released in the United States, all excluded the word "Little" from the title. The first book was also released as My Friend the Vampire. Only volumes 1-5 were released in the United States. All other English translations were released in the United Kingdom.

===== Andersen Press =====
- The Little Vampire, vol. #1
- The Little Vampire Moves In, vol. #2
- The Little Vampire Takes a Trip, vol. #3
- The Little Vampire On the Farm, vol. #4
- The Little Vampire In Love, vol. #5

===== Simon & Schuster Young Books =====
- The Little Vampire In Danger, vol. #6
- The Little Vampire In the Vale Of Doom, vol. #7
- The Little Vampire In Despair, vol. #8
- The Little Vampire and the Mystery Patient, vol. #9
- The Little Vampire In the Lion's Den, vol. #10
- The Little Vampire Learns To Be Brave, vol. #11
- The Little Vampire Gets a Surprise, vol. #12
- The Little Vampire and the Wicked Plot, vol. #13
- The Little Vampire and the School Trip, vol. #14
- The Little Vampire and the Christmas Surprise, vol. #15

===== MacDonald Young Books =====
- The Little Vampire Meets Count Dracula, vol. # 16

===== Scholastic =====
- The Little Vampire Activity Book

===== Untranslated to English =====
These have yet to be released with an English translation.

- The Little Vampire and the Dance Hour, vol #17
- The Little Vampire Has a Birthday, vol #18
- The Little Vampire and the Night of the Shivers, vol. #19
- The Little Vampire and the Last Conversion, vol #20
- The Little Vampire and the Question of Questions, vol #21

==== Others ====
- But Still, I Love Her Just The Same:Poems (Poetry)
- If You Want To Scare Yourself (Short stories)
- Coco's Birthday Surprise (children's book)

=== German ===
- Der kleine Vampir, 1979
- Sarah bei den Wölfen, Gedichte, 1979
- Der kleine Vampir zieht um, 1980
- Das Biest, das im Regen kam, 1981
- Ich lieb dich trotzdem immer, Gedichte, 1982
- Der kleine Vampir verreist, 1982
- Der kleine Vampir auf dem Bauernhof, 1983
- Wenn du dich gruseln willst, 1984
- Der kleine Vampir und die große Liebe, 1985
- Der kleine Vampir in Gefahr, 1985
- Der kleine Vampir im Jammertal, 1986
- Coco geht zum Geburtstag, 1986
- Die Moorgeister, 1986
- Möwen und Wölfe, Gedichte, 1987
- Freu dich nicht zu früh, ich verlaß dich nie!, Gedichte, 1987
- Der kleine Vampir liest vor, 1988
- Die Unterirdischen, 1988
- Julia bei den Lebenslichtern, 1989
- Florians gesammelte Gruselgeschichten, 1990
- Gerneklein, 1990
- Mein allerliebster Teddybär, Gedichte, 1991
- Schokolowski - Der Geburtstags-Trüffelhund, 1991
- Schokolowski – Lustig ist das Hundeleben, 1992
- Schokolowski – Vorsicht, Hundefänger, 1992
- Schokolowski – König Leckermaul, 1992
- Schokolowski – Hilfe, ein Baby!, 1993
- Wenn die Füchse Kaffee kochen, 1993
- Benjamin Biber, 1994
- Von jenseits der großen Waldes, 1994
- Hanna, Gottes kleinster Engel, 1995
- Das Haar der Berenice, 1998
- Der kleine Vampir und die Tanzstunde, 2001
- Der kleine Vampir hat Geburtstag, 2001
- Kasimir von Käsebleich kommt in die Schule, 2003
- Kasimir von Käsebleich und der Ranzenmann, 2003
- Jeremy Golden und der Meister der Schatten, 2005
- Der kleine Vampir und die Gruselnacht, 2006
- Der kleine Vampir und die letzte Verwandlung, 2007
- Der kleine Vampir und die Frage aller Fragen, 2015
