= The Little Vampire (book series) =

Novel series by Angela Sommer-Bodenburg

- Author: Angela Sommer-Bodenburg
- Original title: Der kleine Vampir
- Illustrator: Amelie Glienke
- Cover artist: Amelie Glienke
- Language: German
- Genre: Fantasy novel, children literature
- Publisher: Rowohlt Verlag
- Publication date: 1979
- Publication place: Germany
- Media type: Print (paperback)
- ISBN: 3499202166

The Little Vampire (German: "Der kleine Vampir") is the title of a series of children's fantasy books created in 1979 by Angela Sommer-Bodenburg. The overall plot deals with the friendship between a human boy called Anton and Rüdiger, a vampire boy. The basic idea dates back to 1976, when Sommer-Bodenburg wrote short stories about the adventures of the little vampire and a human boy, finally collecting them and forming the series' plot from them.

== Synopsis ==
Protagonist Anton Bohnsack, a 9-year-old boy who is fascinated by vampires, meets and befriends Rüdiger, a member of the Schlotterstein vampire clan who reside in the local cemetery. Little by little, Anton befriends Rüdiger's younger sister Anna and older brother Lumpi. Anton undertakes frequent nightly "trips" with Rüdiger and Anna, wherein Anton must hide his presence (and his friendship with Rüdiger) from hostile vampires, his own parents, and the fanatic Geiermeier, the cemetery's caretaker.

== Characters ==
=== Main characters ===
Anton Bohnsack

Anton (Tony in the English version) is 9 years old and attends the 3rd grade. He likes reading horror stories, especially vampire stories like those written by Sheridan Le Fanu or Hugh Walpole. After becoming involved in the world of vampires, he goes to great lengths to assist both his new friends, Rüdiger and Anna, and their family (who are not fully aware of Anton's friendship with Rüdiger) against potential dangers, including his own parents and especially Geiermeier.
At the end of the series, Anton's parents have separated and found new partners, making him feel left out and consider Anna's invitation to become a vampire himself. In the first edition of the final volume, titled Die Frage aller Fragen (The Question of All Questions), Anton decides to join his best friends as a vampire; in the 2024 re-edition, Dein Freund für immer (Your Friend Forever), he declines the offer but still preserves his friendship with Anna and Rüdiger.

Rüdiger von Schlotterstein

Rüdiger (Rudolph in the English version) is the second youngest of the Schlotterstein clan, and was turned into a vampire when he was 11. Though mostly only interested in his own benefit, he never abandons his friends. He shows the vampires' world to Anton and meets him as often as possible. He has a lot of respect for his older brother Lumpi and tries to emulate him. There are typical siblings troubles between him and his sister Anna.

Anna von Schlotterstein

Anna is the youngest of the Schlotterstein children and was turned into a vampire at the age of 9. Shortly after Rüdiger met Anton, he introduces Anna to his human friend. Anna and Anton develop a crush on each other, but their respective natures as human and vampire pose an impenetrable barrier for a more serious relationship. Initially, Anna was known as "Anna die Zahnlose" ("Anna the Toothless") because she didn't want to become a true vampire and drank milk as a substitute nourishment, though later on she gives in to her true nature, although her affection for Anton still remains strong. At the end of the series, she is appointed the successor of the German vampire leader, Elisabeth die Naschhafte.

=== Schlotterstein vampires ===
Lumpi der Starke (Lumpi the Strong)

Rüdiger and Anna's older brother, and the self-proclaimed strongman of his family. He is moody and temperamental, due to his becoming a vampire while still in puberty. Although he occasionally threatens and intimidates Anton, he is generally on good terms with him and keeps his and his siblings' friendship with the human confidential from the adult von Schlottersteins.

Dorothee von Schlotterstein-Seifenschwein

Rüdiger and Anna's aunt, and while reputedly the most bloodthirsty and relentless of the Schlotterstein vampires, she does seem to look out for the children more than the other adults. Nevertheless, with her Anton has had several close calls. Ever since losing her husband Theodor to Geiermeier, she has been on the prowl for a new mate, and though for a while she is attracted to the phony vampire Ingo von Rant, she later switches her affections to Giselher Schwanenhals, the instructor of Anton's dance class and, coupled with his willingness to become a vampire, marries him near the end of the series. However, just one year later the marriage is divorced, and Schwanenhals ends up marrying Anna's grandaunt.

Theodor von Seifenschwein

Rüdiger and Anna's uncle. Long before the series begins, he was caught playing cards on his tombstone by Geiermeier, who subsequently killed him. This event forced the Schlottersteins into moving their coffins into a subterranean crypt beneath the cemetery. Theodor's coffin remains in the crypt, as a cover for a secret emergency exit, and his vampire cloak is lent to Anton by Rüdiger and Anna on a regular basis for his nocturnal vampire adventures.

Sabine die Schreckliche (Sabine the Terrible)

The matriarch of the Schlotterstein family, and Rüdiger, Anna and Lumpi's grandmother.

Wilhelm der Wüste (William the Rakish)

Sabine's husband, and Rüdiger and Anna's grandfather.

Ludwig der Fürchterliche (Ludwig the Horrible) and Hildegard die Durstige (Hildegard the Thirsty)

These two vampires are the son and daughter-in-law of Sabine die Schreckliche and therefore Rüdiger, Anna and Lumpi's parents. Ludwig is devoted to his wife, but she is a vain and selfish creature who usually ignores her children.

=== Humans ===
Anton's Parents

Robert Anton Bohnsack, a jokester and shipping company worker, and his wife Helga, a rather temperamental schoolteacher, are Anton's greatest obstacles in his new life with the vampires. Initially they do not believe that Anton's new friends (Rüdiger and Anna) are vampires, although they find the latter's mode of dress rather peculiar. However, after an incident in which Anna was inadvertently photographed but did not appear in the picture, they both begin to take the matter a bit more seriously, even if they still do not fully believe in the existence of vampires. Like his son Anton, Mr. Bohnsack was named after his own father (and Anton's grandfather).

Hans-Heinrich Geiermeier

The keeper of the local old cemetery and the self-declared nemesis of the Schlotterstein vampires. After encountering Uncle Theodor by chance and killing him, Geiermeier has been waging his private war with the vampires ever since, a conflict in which Anton often has to interfere for the benefit of his friends. His anti-vampire habits include garlic as part of his regular diet, and an armament of wooden stakes carried on his nighttime patrols.

Wolf-Rüdiger Schnuppermaul

A gardener hailing from Stuttgart who was hired as Geiermeier's assistant for hunting down vampires. Unlike Geiermeier, Schnuppermaul is somewhat dimwitted, less obsessive and has an extreme cleanliness quirk, making him a comic relief figure contrasting his partner and employer. He unwittingly becomes friends with Lumpi, and even after discovering the latter's true nature, they retain their friendship at the end of the series.

Dr. Jürgen Schwartenfeger

Schwartenfeger is a psychologist. He first appears when Anton's parents decide to send their son to him to cure him of his fascination of vampires, but it turns out that Schwartenfeger has actually developed a program to help vampires in overcoming their aversion to sunlight, which he believes to be a psychological condition rather than a physiological one. Rüdiger eventually becomes one of his patients.

Igno von Rant

Von Rant makes his first appearance as a patient for Schwartenfeger's vampire desensibilization program. Although he presents himself as a vampire, von Rant (whose name is a play on "ignorant") is actually a university professor named August Piepenschnurz who is in cahoots with Geiermeier. He woos Aunt Dorothee and tries to win the trust of the Schlotterstein children, but his masquerade is exposed thanks to Anton's efforts.

Klara and Michael Brunner

Klara Brunner and her father Michael, a professor, live in an old, sealed-off villa. Klara suffers from a gentically inherited skin condition which renders her severely sensitive, especially to sunlight; her mother had the same sickness and died from it. In his search for a cure for his daughter, Michael encountered Anna, who incidentally fulfilled the requirements for alleviating the symptoms whenever she drinks Klara's blood, thereby also giving Anna what she needs. Because of the sickness' similarity to vampirism, the Brunners have collected a huge number of fictional and non-fictional, and in some cases quite rare, literary works about vampires. Upon Anna's invitation, Anton spends part of his summer holidays after his parents' separation with the Brunners while he considers which course his life shall take.

=== Other vampires ===
Olga, Fräulein von Seifenschwein

The cousin of Rüdiger and Anna from their uncle's side. A spoiled, manipulative and highly arrogant girl, she fled from Transylvania to Germany when her family was destroyed by a band of vampire hunters, seeking sanctuary with her aunt's family. She quickly becomes the romantic interest for Rüdiger, but expresses more interest in Anton instead. Only after she bites Anton and drinks his blood to make him her slave does Rüdiger finally overcome his infatuation and breaks up with her for Anton's sake.

Count Dracula

The legendary vampire has several appearances in the series as the overlord of the world's vampires. He eventually becomes a teacher for the Schlotterstein children, but ultimately fails in his task.

Elisabeth die Naschhafte (Elisabeth the Sweet-Toothed)

The leader of the German faction of the world's vampires. At the end of the series, she chooses Anna von Schlotterstein to be her successor.

Jörg der Aufbrausende (Jörg the Irascible) and Waldi der Bösartige (Waldi the Malignant)

Two young vampires who are Lumpi's best friends and members of his Vampire Men's Club and Vampire Men's Music Association, regularly organizing bowling tournaments or nail treatment competitions.

== English editions ==
1. My Friend the Vampire (also The Little Vampire) (1979) ISBN 0671554212
2. The Little Vampire Moves In (1980) ISBN 1842705962
3. The Little Vampire Takes a Trip (1982) ISBN 0862640849
4. The Little Vampire on the Farm (1983) ISBN 0590556002
5. The Little Vampire in Love (1985) ISBN 0590556010
6. The Little Vampire In Danger (1985) ISBN 0750004088
7. The Little Vampire in the Vale of Doom (1986) ISBN 075000410X
8. The Little Vampire in Despair ISBN 0750004126
9. The Little Vampire and the Mystery Patient ISBN 0750011866
10. The Little Vampire in the Lion's Den ISBN 0750013699
11. The Little Vampire Learns to Be Brave ISBN 0750013729
12. The Little Vampire Gets a Surprise ISBN 0750014067
13. The Little Vampire and the Wicked Plot ISBN 0750014075
14. The Little Vampire And The School Trip ISBN 0750015381
15. The Little Vampire And The Christmas Surprise ISBN 0750015403
16. The Little Vampire Meets Count Dracula ISBN 075001542X

=== Unreleased to English ===
1. The Little Vampire and the Dance Lesson (Der kleine Vampir und die Tanzstunde)
2. The Little Vampire's Birthday (Der kleine Vampir hat Geburtstag)
3. The Little Vampire and the Scary Night (Der kleine Vampir und die Gruselnacht)
4. The Little Vampire and the Final Metamorphosis (Der kleine Vampir und die letzte Verwandlung)
5. Anna von Schlotterstein's Noctary (Anna von Schlottersteins Nächtebuch) - an interlude volume filling the narrative gap between The Final Metamorphosis and The Question of All Questions
6. The Little Vampire and the Question of All Questions (Der kleine Vampir und die Frage aller Fragen) - final book of the series
7. The Little Vampire: Your Friend Forever (Der kleine Vampir: Dein Freund für immer) - 2024 re-edition of The Question of All Questions featuring an alternative ending

== Reception ==
Der kleine Vampir has proved quite successful both domestically and internationally. Over 12 million of these children's books have been sold, and they were translated into more than 30 languages. The little vampire's adventures were also published in the form of audio books, comics, films and musicals.

== Adaptations ==
TV series

- The Little Vampire, a German-Canadian television series, featuring Gert Fröbe as Detective Gurrmeyer (Geiermeier) (original language: English).
- Der kleine Vampir – Neue Abenteuer ("The little vampire: New adventures"), a German 13-episode TV series based on the third and fourth volumes of the series, The Little Vampire Takes a Trip and The Little Vampire on the Farm.
- In October 2024, it was announced that a new live-action television series was in the works produced by Warner Bros. ITVP Germany and Frisbeefilms.

Films

- The Little Vampire, a 2000 German-Dutch-American motion picture, with the series' setting relocated to Scotland instead of Germany as in the original book series.
- The Little Vampire 3D, a 2017 3D computer animation film directed by Richard Claus and Karsten Kiilerich, in which Jim Carter and Alice Krige reprise their roles of Rookery and Freda, respectively, from the 2000 film.

== See also ==
- Vampire film
