= For the Cause =

For the Cause may refer to:

- "For the Cause" (Star Trek: Deep Space Nine), an episode of the TV series
- For the Cause (film), a 2000 science fiction film starring Dean Cain
- For the Cause (album), a 2018 album by Madball
