= Thomas Ian Griffith =

American actor, producer, and screenwriter

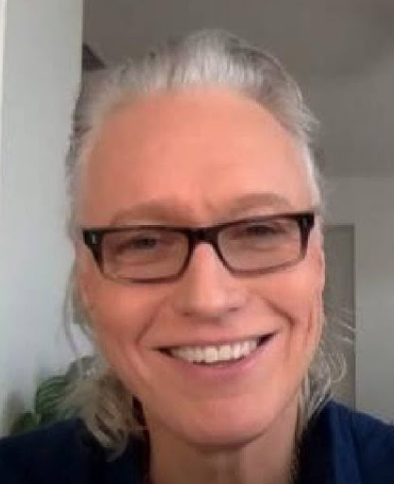
- Griffith in December 2021
- Born: Thomas Ian Griffith; Hartford, Connecticut, U.S.
- Other name: Thomas Griffith
- Education: College of the Holy Cross; New York University
- Occupations: Actor; screenwriter; producer
- Years active: 1976–present
- Organization: Ian Page Productions
- Television: Another World; One Tree Hill; Grimm; Cobra Kai; Virgin River
- Spouse: Mary Page Keller (m. 1991)
- Children: 2

Thomas Ian Griffith (born c. 1960 or 1961) is an American actor, screenwriter and producer. His best-known roles include Terry Silver in John G. Avildsen's 1989 martial arts film The Karate Kid Part III, which he later reprised in the fourth through sixth and final season of the Netflix television series Cobra Kai (2021–2025), as well as voicing his character in the video game Cobra Kai 2: Dojos Rising (2022); head vampire Jan Valek in John Carpenter's 1998 neo-Western action horror film Vampires; warrior Taligaro in Raffaella De Laurentiis' 1997 sword and sorcery picture Kull the Conqueror; recurring character Larry Sawyer in the first season of The WB's teen drama series One Tree Hill (2004); and Catlin Ewing in NBC's soap opera Another World from 1984–1987. He also portrayed screen legend Rock Hudson in ABC's 1990 television biopic Rock Hudson, and serial killer Doug Clark in CBS's 2000 television biopic A Vision of Murder: The Story of Donielle.

Griffith wrote, story edited, co-produced, or supervised produced over sixty episodes of NBC's fantasy police procedural drama horror program Grimm from its second through sixth and final season (2012–2017), and has written, supervised producer, or co-executive produced over thirty episodes of Netflix's romantic drama series Virgin River during its fifth through seventh seasons (2023–2025). He and his wife, Mary Page Keller, formed the independent film production company Ian Page Productions in the late 1980s, through which they produced a handful of films, including Night of the Warrior (1991), Ulterior Motives (1991), Excessive Force (1992), and Avalanche (1999).

During the early 1990s, he was positioned to be one of Hollywood's next big action stars. From critics and journalists, he received frequent comparisons to actors like Jean Claude van Damme, Steven Seagal, Chuck Norris, Jeff Speakman, Sylvester Stallone, Arnold Schwarzenegger, Dolph Lundgren, and even Clint Eastwood, Harrison Ford, and Mickey Rourke. Writing for the New York Daily News in 1992, Nancy Stedman offered, "He's being touted as a better-looking version of Arnold Schwarzenegger or Jean-Claude Van Damme. But with a difference: Muscles are a sideline with Griffith; he has spent years acting in theater." At the eighth annual ShowEast film industry conference held in Atlantic City, New Jersey, in October 1992, Griffith received the Star of Tomorrow Award.

== Early life ==
=== Birth and family background ===
Thomas Ian Griffith was born in Hartford, Connecticut, the son of Irish-American Hartford natives Mary Ann (née O'Neil; 1934–1990) and Dr. Thomas Joseph Griffith (1927–2017). His maternal grandfather, John J. O'Neil, was born in Killorglin, County Kerry, Ireland, and emigrated to Hartford in the 1920s. His maternal grandmother, Margaret (née Galvin), was also born in County Kerry, Ireland and spent most of her life in Hartford. His paternal grandparents, Michael J. Griffith and Mary Agnes (née Radigan), were both born in County Mayo, Ireland, and emigrated (separately) to Hartford in the 1910s.

Griffith's mother, who was voted Mrs. Connecticut of 1964, was the founder and director of the noted Irish dancing academy, The Griffith Academy of Dance in Wethersfield, Connecticut. She was a graduate of the University of Hartford, and received a Master's degree in counseling from St. Joseph College. She was also accredited by the An Coimisiún Le Rincí Gaelacha (The Irish Dancing Commission) as a Teagascóir Coimisiún Le Rinci Gaelacha - an official Irish dance teacher. His paternal grandmother, Mary Agnes, was also a member of The Irish Dancing Commission. His father served in the Navy during World War II and later hosted a weekly Sunday radio show, The Irish Hour (produced by his brother William E. Griffith). He earned a Bachelor of Science degree in Engineering from the University of Hartford and went on to earn three Master of Science degrees and a PhD in Education from Boston University. He was an assistant professor in business administration at the University of Hartford, before moving to Florida to teach at Lynn University in Boca Raton and Broward College in Davie.

Griffith has an older sister, Colleen Marie, and a younger sister, Mary Beth, both of whom continued in their mother's footsteps and teach at The Griffith Academy. His family's dancing background and the taking over of the academy by his sister after his mother's passing would later be developed by Griffith into a television program, The Dunnings.

=== Education and early plays (1962–1980) ===
Griffith grew up in Wethersfield, Connecticut. During the 1960s, he was part of the youth Irish dancing group The Griffith Dancers, under the direction of his mother. The dancing group traveled around the United States, Canada, United Kingdom, and Ireland, performing and taking part in competitions. In addition to learning various forms of dancing (such as Irish step-dancing, Celtic folk-dancing, and hornpipe dancing) from his mother, he also learned to sing and play several instruments, including the piano and the accordion. He was so proficient on the accordion that he won United States and Connecticut State championships. At certain shows he would dance a jig and play his accordion, and would usually accompany The Griffith Dancers on the instrument. Of his dancing, he later said "I never had a formal dance lesson in my life, I picked up tap dancing while playing the piano for allowance money as a child in Hartford, Connecticut." Griffith also juggled and wrote songs.

He attended South Catholic High School in Hartford, graduating with the class of 1978, where he was Treasurer his junior year, Vice-President his senior year, and also co-editor of the school's yearbook, the Canticle. He won awards in algebra, biology, and chemistry, and was a member of the State Creative Youth. He focused on sports his freshman year, playing football and basketball, but was later drawn into music and theater, as a member of the school's madigral and glee club. His sophomore year, he joined the school's drama club, The South Catholic Players, when it needed a last-minute replacement piano accompanist for a production of You're a Good Man, Charlie Brown. As a way to meet girls who acted in the plays, Griffith also wound up acting in the school's productions. His senior year, under the direction of John Kiely, he played the lead, Albert Peterson, in a March 31–April 1, 1978 production of the musical comedy Bye Bye Birdie. The play also starred Marie Fischetti, Steve Dolin, and Ellen Smith.

Griffith became obsessed with taekwondo when he was 12, studying at the S.K. Tae Kwon Do Academy in Hartford, and earned a black belt when he was 18. He later earned a black belt in American Kenpo while studying the sport in New York under Hyung Yup Chung. After moving to Los Angeles in the late 1980s, he studied with Jun Chong. In the 1990s, he picked up boxing under Benny Urquidez. He is also trained in kickboxing, wrestling, fencing, and stage combat.

Griffith attended the College of the Holy Cross in Worcester, Massachusetts, where he was a dean's list student. As an undergraduate at Holy Cross, he majored in English literature and music, and played on its lacrosse team. Griffith later mentioned taking part in the college's plays. In a 2021 interview, Griffith stated that he later transferred to New York University between his sophomore and junior year after he was cast in The Best Little Whorehouse in Texas.

== Career ==
=== Theater and soap operas (1980–1987) ===
In the summer of 1980, between his sophomore and junior year at the College of the Holy Cross, Griffith made his Broadway debut when he replaced featured player Tom Cashin in the musical The Best Little Whorehouse in Texas, under the direction of Peter Masterson and Tommy Tune at the 46th Street Theatre. In a 1984 interview with the Los Angeles Times, the actor confided that Tune (for whom he audition) hired him more for his physique and dancing skills than his acting abilities. He later told The Star-Ledger in 1992, "They noticed 'Celtic step dancing' on my resume, and I was asked if I could demonstrate. So I cranked out a little step. They loved it." Griffith performed various roles in the play, including a stage manager, a cameraman, and a football player named Aggie #12 who does a specialty tap-dance. He remained with the play for about a year. Having a steady role in the play allowed the actor to move from Yonkers into an apartment in Manhattan, and he transferred to New York University, which he attended during the day. He also studied the Michael Chekhov acting technique in New York City during this time.

The next year, he landed another role in the Broadway sports musical The First, which dramatized events from the life of Jackie Robinson, the first African-American to play Major League Baseball. In that play, which ran from October 19 to December 12, 1981, under the direction of Martin Charnin at the Martin Beck Theatre, Griffith also played various parts (including Thurman the Brooklyn Eagle photographer, a passenger, a Brooklyn Dodgers rookie, and a Pittsburgh Pirates player). He also appeared in off-Broadway productions.

He was hired and cast in the 1983–1984 season of the Guthrie Theater in Minneapolis, Minnesota, appearing in the first two plays, The Threepenny Opera (which ran from June 10 to July 17, 1983, directed by Liviu Ciulei) and Guys and Dolls (which ran from July 29 to September 18, 1983, directed by Garland Wright). The theater's production of The Threepenny Opera starred Theodore Bikel, while Guys and Dolls' starred Roy Thinnes, Jerry Stiller, Barbara Sharma, and Mike Mazurki (Griffith had a small part as one of the craps-shooters, which had a couple of singing numbers). Griffith was scheduled to appear in five other productions at the Guthrie Theater that season, The Entertainer (September 23 to October 23, 1983), The Seagull (October 28 to November 20, 1983), A Christmas Carol (November 24, 1983 to January 1, 1984), The Importance of Being Ernest (January 6 to February 12, 1984), and Hedda Gabler (February 17 to March 11, 1984), but he departed for New York.

His stage and theater roles were usually credited under his shortened names, Tom Griffith or Thomas Griffith; he would not be credited as Thomas Ian Griffith until he was cast in Another World in late 1983, to avoid confusion with another actor, Tom Griffith (who appeared in horror films The Alien Factor (1978), Fiend (1980), Night of Horror (1981), and Nightbeast (1982)).

A New York casting director caught Griffith's work at the Guthrie Theater and arranged for him two auditions in late 1983; one for ABC and another for NBC. The one for an ABC soap opera did not pan out, but from the second audition (in which he was paired with Mary Page Keller), he received two simultaneous offers to join either Another World or Search for Tomorrow, both NBC daytime soap operas. The actor chose Another World, was signed to a nine-month contract, and was cast as the Texan "troublemaking-womanizer" Catlin Ewing. Griffith had initially planned to return to stage work after his nine-month contract expired, with the television experience added to his resumé, and he took acting lessons when he had time off from shooting. He was also noted for performing and choreographing his own stunts on the show. He made his television-acting debut in January 1984 and wound up playing Ewing for three years, until January 1987. After nine months on the show, he started dating his co-star and onscreen new love interest, Mary Page Keller; the couple eventually married in 1991.

Appearing on Another World made him "one of daytime television's more familiar and possibly popular faces," a "matinee idol," and a "soap superstar." He was featured on the cover of Soap Opera Digest's October 1984 issue. By 1985, he was a frequently invited guest at international trade shows and exhibitions, where he met fans and signed autographs. During one of these promotional tours to the Southern United States in the fall of 1985, Griffith landed an uncredited bit part as an extra in the Miami Vice episode "Phil the Shill," which was filmed in Miami, Florida in late October and early November 1985. The episode, which guest starred Phil Collins, was directed by John Nicolella and was broadcast on NBC in December 1985. As early as July 1986, news circulated that Griffith, although playing a popular character on Another World, was not going to renew his contract once it ended in January 1987, and the importance of his role was gradually diminished in the writing of the show.

In December 1986, Griffith and Keller were invited to perform on the tenth annual televised benefit special Telethon of Stars, broadcast from CTV and TQS in Montreal, Quebec, Canada. The 22-hour program was a fundraiser for research into children's diseases and featured such stars as Tony Bennett, James Brown, Ginette Reno, Daniel Lavoie, Joe Bocan, Ranee Lee, and Édith Butler. The couple performed two originals songs, but were plagued by issues. Reviewing their much-publicized set for The Montreal Gazette, a critic wrote "As for Thomas Ian Griffin [sic] and Mary Page Keller of Another World, they were downright livid and for good reason. On their first song, they couldn't hear themselves singing, and the camera cut away from them before the applause started. They were promised everything would be ironed out by their second tune, but when they started to lip-sync, the tape started halfway through the song. As soon as the song was over, they stormed off in a huff. Or was it a limo?"

=== Hollywood and Ian Page Productions (1987–1993) ===
After leaving Another World in 1985, his girlfriend Keller moved from their Upper West Side, Manhattan cooperative apartment (which they shared with an actress and a choreographer) to Los Angeles, California (she was a native of Monterey, California); Griffith remained behind as Another World was mostly filmed in Brooklyn, but he joined her in early 1987, when his contract expired. There, they made their home and formed an independent film production company, initially named A Place to Hide Productions but later renamed Ian Page Productions, after the couple's middle names, and he began writing the screenplay for A Place to Hide (later filmed as Night of the Warrior). He also appeared in a production of the Gianni Schicchi opera at the University of Southern California.

In 1988, Griffith had a guest role on NBC's prime-time television crime drama series In the Heat of the Night; he appeared in the Peter Levin-directed two-part season two premiere episode "Don't Look Back," which aired on December 4, 1988. Griffith plays the role of Luke Potter, a transient carnival worker suspected of committing a murder with voodoo connections, one that has the same modus operandi as an unsolved murder from twenty years prior.

In late 1988, Griffith landed his theatrical film debut when he was cast as the lead villain in The Karate Kid Part III (released in June 1989). In the film, he portrays Terry Silver, a rival martial arts expert who influences Daniel LaRusso against his friend and mentor, Mr. Miyagi. Although many reporters assumed that he won the role of Silver because of his knowledge of martial arts, Griffith explained that he landed the part solely because of his acting experience as the character of Silver, as originally written when he auditioned, didn't have much fighting in the film. The plot initially revolved around Silver torturing LaRusso and plotting his demise, but once the film's fight choreographer, Pat Johnson, discovered Griffith's expertise with martial arts, he recommended that the actor approach director John G. Avildsen for new scenes to be written. Avildsen was excited about expanding Silver's parts and reworked the script to make the character an equal nemesis.

Despite being offered similar martial arts roles following The Karate Kid Part III, the actor did not want to be typecast. When interviewed by Black Belt magazine, Griffith explained he wanted to keep his roles balanced, and that although he loved doing action and martial arts films, he was also driven to keep playing straight drama parts, and was interested in going back to plays and doing Shakespeare. He also told the New York Daily News "I'm hoping that in between the big action films there will be something more soulful."

Griffith then landed another guest role on CBS's prime-time television crime drama series Wiseguy; he appeared in the two-part season two finale episodes "Le Lacrime d'Amore Part 1: AKA The Four-Letter Word" (directed by Frank E. Johnson) and "Le Lacrime d'Amore Part 2: AKA There's Plenty of Time," (directed by Bill Corcoran) which both aired on May 24, 1989. Griffith plays the role of Roger Totland, Amber Twine's (Patti D'Arbanville) attorney who convinces her to sever ties with the protagonist, Vinnie Terranova (Ken Wahl), by seducing and wining and dining her, in an attempt to profit from the sale of her company and real estate.

His agent heard that ABC was casting for its television biopic of late screen actor Rock Hudson and sent Griffith over to audition for director John Nicolella. Although Griffith only did a cold reading, Nicolella loved his delivery and asked him to repeat the audition for a dozen ABC executives; the following day, Griffith was informed that he had the part. The actor admitted to The New York Times that before the Hudson biopic, he was not a fan of the screen legend's work and had only seen Giant (1956), but that through research for the role, he learned to appreciate the late actor's work and found it to be a great role for him. Griffith was only one inch taller than Hudson and had a similar physique, but required several hours of makeup each day (including darkening his brown hair and wearing brown contacts over his blue eyes) to get into character, especially when depicting Hudson's final years as he was dying from AIDS. Producer Frank Konigsberg later told newspaper reporters that he felt it was more important to cast an actor who could play Hudson's tortured spirit than an exact lookalike, and that Griffith "has the presence, the height and the build of Rock. He also has that wonderful kind of open, all-American quality, a boyish innocence that makes you really like the guy. That's what Rock had, too." The two-hour Rock Hudson film was broadcast on ABC in January 1990.

Through Ian Page Productions, Griffith wrote and co-produced the action flic Night of the Warrior, which originated from a screenplay and story he wrote in 1988 titled A Place to Hide. The film, when initially scheduled to start shooting in late November 1988 (before being delayed when Griffith was cast in The Karate Kid Part III), was a mystery-drama flic about a poet who works at a strip club. It was to be directed by Scott Thomas and co-star Griffith and Keller with a cast that boasted Arlene Dahl, Bill Erwin, Dana Ashbrook, and Chris Lemmon, and be co-produced by Mike Erwin (son of actor Bill Erwin) and Jeff King. By 1989, the film's cast had changed to star Lorenzo Lamas (Dahl's real-life son) replacing Griffith; the former also came in as co-producer through his film production company, Blueline Productions/Erwin, Lamas, Kirishima Productions (co-owned with Mike Erwin and J. Max Kirishima). Erwin, Lamas, and Griffith had met through their love of karate. With new producers Lamas and Kirishima on board, the script was drastically changed to include more martial arts and turn it into more of an action film, about which Griffith was unhappy (the film was also retitled Night Warrior). With a $3 million budget, the movie was finally filmed between March–May 1990, with director Rafal Zielinski and starring Lamas, Kathleen Kinmont (Lamas' real-life wife, replacing Keller), Dahl, Erwin, Anthony Geary, and Danny Kamekona. It was initially to be distributed in 1990 via Kodiak Films, but was ultimately distributed in theaters via Trimark Pictures and Little Bear Films in June 1991, and on video and laserdisc via its division Vidmark Entertainment, in September 1991.

Griffith and Keller next co-wrote, co-produced, and co-starred in the political action thriller film Ulterior Motives (working title Deadline) involving a New York Times reporter, Erica Boswell (Keller), who uncovers a story about a Japanese-American businessman selling U.S. defense secrets to Japan. She hires private detective Jack Blaylock (Griffith) to help with the investigation. Directed by James Becket, its cast also included Ken Howard, Ellen Crawford, M.C. Gainey, Hayward Nishioka, Tyra Ferrell, and Joe Yamanaka. Ulterior Motives was again produced in cooperation with Erwin and Lamas' film production company, Erwin, Lamas, Kirishima Productions, and was filmed between June–August 1990 for $3 million. It was screened in February and March 1991 at the American Film Market in Santa Monica, California, was then presented out-of-competition at the Cannes Film Festival in France through Filmstar in May 1991, then received limited screenings via Pangea Film Group in 1991. A larger release happened two years later in late 1992, when Imperial Entertainment issued it on video and laserdisc.

With several acting, writing, and producing credits to his name, Griffith was picked up for representation by talent agency Creative Artists Agency. In 1991, his agent took Griffith's new screenplay for Excessive Force, in which he plays Detective Terry McCain, a Chicago police officer who gets framed for the murder of a mob boss, to New Line Cinema. Within two weeks, New Line Cinema's president Michael Lynne had agreed to finance and distribute the film and wanted Griffith to also star in it. It was also organized as a co-production with Erwin Stoff, Michael Rotenberg, and Howard Klein's 3 Arts Productions. Ultimately, the offer evolved into a three-picture writing-producing-starring-directing deal for Ian Page Productions, though Griffith did not use his option to direct the film. Griffith said he wanted someone else to direct so that he could focus on acting on the set.

Excessive Force was given a $5.5 million budget and John Hess was hired to direct, while Griffith produced, co-choreographed (with Bobby Bass), and starred in the film; he can also be seen playing several jazz tunes on the piano. The movie was filmed on location in Chicago, Illinois between March–May 1992, and included such notable stars as James Earl Jones, Burt Young, and Lance Henriksen. For his role, Griffith did research by spending time with real Chicago cops who patrolled rough areas of the city and was present during a raid on a crack house. Excessive Force received limited theatrical releases starting on November 6, 1992 and into 1993, during which Griffith embarked on a promotional tour to plug the film. The wide theatrical opening of Excessive Force was in February 1993, and by May 1993, the film was in theaters everywhere. Although the film fared poorly at the box office, grossing only $1.1 million in the US, it sold so well when issued on VHS and laserdisc that same year via New Line Home Video (with distribution through Image Entertainment), grossing a profit within months, that New Line Cinema was open to a sequel. That sequel was eventually produced, Excessive Force II: Force on Force, but without any input from Griffith.

Between 1991–1993, Griffith was positioned to be one of Hollywood's next big action stars. From critics and journalists, he received frequent comparisons to actors like Jean Claude van Damme, Steven Seagal, Chuck Norris, Jeff Speakman, Sylvester Stallone, Arnold Schwarzenegger, Dolph Lundgren, and even Clint Eastwood, Harrison Ford, and Mickey Rourke. Writing for the New York Daily News, Nancy Stedman offered "He's being touted as a better-looking version of Arnold Schwarzenegger or Jean-Claude Van Damme. But with a difference: Muscles are a sideline with Griffith; he has spent years acting in theater." When interviewed by Variety, New Line Cinema president Michael Lynne described the actor as "New Line's version of Steven Seagal." At the eighth annual ShowEast film industry conference held in Atlantic City, New Jersey in October 1992, Griffith received the Star of Tomorrow Award.

=== Starring roles in foreign productions (1993–1997) ===
Griffith was next cast to co-star alongside Christopher Plummer and Nastassja Kinski in the Canadian action film Crackerjack, which was directed by Michael Mazo and filmed in Vancouver, British Columbia between September–November 1993. The film deals with Jack Wild (Griffith), a burnt-out cop who is taken to a mountain resort by his brother, sister-in-law, and newborn child to help him recover emotionally from the death of his wife. There, he befriends a tour guide (Kinski), but the entire resort is soon held hostage by a master criminal (Plummer) and his henchmen, who threaten to bury it under an avalanche using explosives. Crackerjack was produced by North American Releasing and was distributed theatrically in the United States by Worldvision Enterprises and had its world premiere at the American Film Market on February 25, 1994. A sequel was produced in 1995, Crackerjack 2, but with Judge Reinhold taking over Griffith's role; a third film was produced in 1999, Crackerjack 3, but with no relation to the first two movies.

He then starred in Nu Image's suspense-action production Blood of the Innocent, which was filmed on location in Nieborów, Czerwińsk nad Wisłą, and Warsaw, Poland between August and September 1994, as a co-production with Poland's Mondofin. The film's working title was Angel of Death and it co-starred John Rhys-Davies and Rutger Hauer. The movie follows Chicago cop Frank Wusharsky (Griffith) who travels to Poland to find the hoods who killed his brother. Aided by the local police captain (Rhys-Davies), he discovers that his sibling was murdered by the Russian mafia, who are killing local peasants and selling their organs on the black market after a doctor (Hauer) dismembers them. The film premiered on Showtime in December 1994, and was later released on VHS via Republic Pictures in 1995, under the alternative title Beyond Forgiveness.

He was again cast by Nu Image in Hollow Point, an action-comedy film co-produced with Canada's Astral Programming Enterprises, Phoenician Films, and Filmline International. Though some stock footage of Boston's landscape was used during the opening, and the police cars bared that city's name, the movie was shot entirely in Montreal, Quebec during seven weeks between April and May 1995. Hollow Point was directed by Sidney J. Furie and co-starred Tia Carrere, John Lithgow, and Donald Sutherland. Griffith (who shows off his operatic singing during several scenes) stars as Max Parrish, a DEA agent who teams up with an FBI agent (Carrere) and a flamboyant hitman (Sutherland) to take down a criminal syndicate led by a financial adviser (Lithgow). The film premiered on HBO in June 1996. Vidmark Entertainment released the film on VHS in the United States, Sterling Entertainment Group released it on DVD in the United States, while TVA Films issued it on DVD in Canada.

In 1995, Griffith wrote, directed, and co-produced the children's martial arts educational film Kick Time!, which starred youth martial arts instructor Robert "Karate Bob" Meltzer (who co-produced). The thirty-minute made-for-video film co-starred Keller (who also co-produced) as Kirby the clown, along with Meltzer's pupils, the Kick Time Kids, showing a basic skills non-aggressive, non-contact program. Originally released on VHS in 1995 through Griffith, Keller, and Meltzer's Kick Time Productions, it was later re-issued on DVD in 2005.

In 1996, Griffith was cast in a co-starring role in Korsala Productions/Raffaella De Laurentiis Productions' sword and sorcery picture Kull the Conqueror, which was shot in Slovakia and Croatia between August and October 1996. The actor was re-teamed with director John Nicolella (from the Rock Hudson biopic) and Tia Carrere (from Hollow Point). The movie starred Kevin Sorbo and featured Gary "Litefoot" Davis, Roy Brocksmith, Harvey Fierstein, and Karina Lombard. The story deals with a barbarian, Kull (Sorbo), who wins the throne of Valusian in a sword fight, much to the dismay of Taligaro (Griffith) and others who each feel they are the rightful inheritors of that position, and who attempt to kill him. The film was released via Universal Pictures in August 1997.

Griffith next starred in Motion Picture Corporation of America's Orion Pictures-distributed action/war film Behind Enemy Lines. Directed by Mark Griffiths, it co-stars Chris Mulkey, Mushond Lee, Courtney Gains, and Maury Sterling, and was filmed in the Philippines. The story deals with ex-United States Marine Corps Mike Weston (Griffith) who is sent back to Vietnam to rescue his friend Jones (Mulkey), the latter of whom was left behind on their last mission. After Weston is betrayed and imprisoned, three of his former Marine friends (Lee, Gaines, and Sterling), along with his sister and a Vietnamese compatriot, help to rescue the pair. Behind Enemy Lines was released in some markets in 1996, such as Ecovideo/Prisvideo's VHS in Portugal, but it had its American premiere on HBO in May 1997.

In March 1997, NBC announced it had filmed a pilot episode for a proposed television drama series named The Angel (later renamed The Guardian), for its fall 1997 schedule. The premise of the show, which was written and directed by Rob Cohen, had Griffith starring as Ray Angelotti (known as The Guardian Angel), an ex-thief and martial arts expert with a sixth-degree Kenpo Karate black belt, who comes out of prison determined to right wrongs and make up for his past misdeeds. The pilot episode also included Stephanie Niznik, Rebecca Rigg, Brian Thompson, and Tippi Hedren. The show was not picked up.

=== Transition to co-starring roles (1997–1999) ===
Griffith was next cast as a co-star in director John Carpenter's neo-Western action horror film Vampires, playing the role of head vampire Jan Valek. The movie starred James Woods, Daniel Baldwin, and Sheryl Lee, and was shot from June to August 1997 in New Mexico. The plot deals with a modern-day vampire hunter (Woods) and his partner (Baldwin), hunting for the world's first vampire (Griffith) in the American south, using his latest victim (Lee) to track him down. The film, which was produced through Spooky Tooth Productions and Storm King Production was distributed via Largo Entertainment, and released through Columbia Pictures in October 1998.

In The First Vampire, a bonus feature included on Vampires' collector's edition Blu-ray, Griffith recalls coming into the production through an audition with Carpenter's wife, producer Sandy King, before going to the Philippines to film Behind Enemy Lines. While filming Behind Enemy Lines, Griffith received news from his agent that he got the part in Vampires. When King and Carpenter first met with Griffith, his hair was still long from his role in Kull the Conqueror, but he had since cut his hair short for the war picture; this gave the producers the idea of giving Valek long hair and sent Griffith in for extensions. Carpenter also instructed Griffith not to take part in pre-production rehearsals with the other actors so that his character would be intentionally detached and emotionless. Griffith would show up to film scenes having never met his co-stars, and often found it difficult not to laugh at Woods' comical improvised lines.

The actor next co-starred in The Unexpected Mrs. Pollifax a spy-mystery for Corymore Productions (in co-production with Scripps Howard Productions), owned by actress Angela Lansbury and her producer husband Peter Shaw. The movie was directed by their son, Anthony Pullen Shaw, and was filmed between November and December 1997, on location in Ireland, France, and Morocco. The story follows Emily Pollifax (Landsbury), a sexagenarian widow who applies to become a CIA agent, and through a mix-up is mistaken for a real agent and sent on a foreign mission. The CIA sends their agent Jack Farrell (Griffith) to shadow her and see that nothing happens to her, but he is caught up in the action. The Unexpected Mrs. Pollifax aired on CBS in May 1999, and the network hoped it would lead to additional Emily Pollifax films.

Griffith next starred in the action-disaster film Avalanche, which he co-produced through Ian Page Productions, in co-operation with producers Richard Pepin and Joseph Merhi's PM Entertainment Group, Greg Mellott, and writer-director Steve Kroschel's Kroschel Films. Griffith also helped with the script. The film was shot at Hatcher Pass, Knik Glacier, and Anchorage, Alaska from October to December 1998, and includes footage of real avalanches, which Kroschel had spent four years documenting and filming beforehand. Co-starring in the movie are Caroleen Feeney, R. Lee Ermey, John Ashton, and C. Thomas Howell. The film's plot deals with a helicopter pilot, Neal Meekin (Griffith), who helps an EPA employee (Feeney) try to prevent an oil company's new pipeline from causing a major avalanche. The film premiered at the Cannes Film Festival in May 1999, out of competition, and had its North American television premiere on UPN in January 2001. It received numerous home media releases, notably a VHS in the United Kingdom by Entertainment In Video in 1999, and a VHS and DVD by First Look Home Entertainment in April 2002, under the alternative title Escape from Alaska. It was later re-issued on DVD by Echo Bridge Home Entertainment in 2017, also under its alternative title.

He then appeared in the dystopian-science fiction film For the Cause (also known as Final Encounter), filmed in April 1999 in Bulgaria. Although second-billed as co-star, Griffith only appears in less than a third of the movie before being killed, and as such is more of a supporting character. Justin Whalin and Jodi Bianca Wise, who are third and fourth billed (behind Dean Cain and Griffith) have more screen time. The plot deals with a future civilization that has been in a hundred-year war with another colony, but its general, Murran (Cain), wishes to bring peace between them. He assembles a team, including Evans (Griffith), Sutherland (Whalin), Abel (Wise), Stoner (Trae Thomas), and Layton (Michelle Krusiec), to lead him across to the other side where, unbeknownst to his crew, he plans to set off a bomb. The film was written and directed by David Douglas (and co-directed by his brother Tim), through their Grand Designs Entertainment production company. After a failed distribution deals with Miramax, the picture was finally released via Dimension Films/Nu Image, initially in foreign markets in early 2000, before premiering in the United States in February 2001.

He was next cast in two video productions by country singer Reba McEntire, both produced through her company, Starstruck Entertainment. The first was a Christmas-time western drama set in Oregon in 1903, starring McEntire as Rose Cameron, a widow whose farm is about to be foreclosed by dishonest bank president Harlan Gotch (Ronny Cox), only to be reluctantly rescued by Harry Withers (Griffith), a lone rider in town. Originally titled Christmas in Calico, after the book on which it is based, it was retitled to Secret of Giving, a song the singer recorded for the film and which is included on her album Secret of Giving: A Christmas Collection, which serves as its semi-soundtrack. The picture was directed by Sam Pillsbury and was filmed in Maple Ridge, Vancouver, and Kamloops, British Columbia, Canada from June to July 1999. It had a special premiere at the Tennessee Performing Arts Center in Nashville, Tennessee in early November 1999, and had its official television premiere on CBS on Thanksgiving day in November 1999.

The actor also co-starred in McEntire's music video for her song "What Do You Say," the lead single from her album So Good Together, released in November 1999 though the record label MCA Nashville. The video was co-produced and directed by Robert Deaton and his firm Deaton-Flanigen Productions, and depicts a mother dying of cancer and how it affects her husband (Griffith) and their two adolescent children. The music video was filmed after the movie but aired on television first, when the song was released as a single in September 1999. The music video, as well as a making-of-the-video feature showing the sets and actors at work, were included as bonus features on the enhanced section of the So Good Together CD. The music video was later included in McEntire's DVD collection Video Gold I, released in November 2006. At the 43rd Annual Grammy Awards in February 2001, the video was nominated for the Grammy Award for Best Short Form Music Video.

Griffith was next cast to co-star as serial killer Doug Brister, a character based on real-life serial killer "Sunset Strip Slayer" Doug Clark, in the thriller A Vision of Murder: The Story of Donielle. The film stars Melissa Gilbert as Donielle Patton (the real-life woman who helped capture Clark), a woman with psychic capabilities who has visions of murdered victim's killers and helps the police apprehend a local serial killer. The movie was co-produced through director-producer Donald Wrye's SpyGaze Pictures company, who had bought the rights to the story directly from Patton. The film also co-stars Maria Conchita Alonso, Kim Hawthorne, and Rip Torn, and was shot in Vancouver, British Columbia during November and December 1999, before premiering on CBS in February 2000.

=== Final starring roles (2000) ===
In February 2000, Griffith signed with the Metropolitan Talent Agency, where he was represented by Chris Barrett and Karen Forman. He was also managed by Himber Entertainment. That same month, it was announced that he would star in Hilltop Entertainment's thriller film Heart of Gold for producer Harel Goldstein and director Yakov Bentsvi. Variety described the plot as "Based on a true story, life on the streets becomes a nightmare when a bodyguard to L.A.'s top call girls falls in love with one of his charges." The film was never made.

The actor was next scooped up by a group of Canadian-British-Italian co-producers to star in two modern adventure films shot back-to-back in 2000: High Adventure and The Sea Wolf. Both films were co-executive produced by British-Canadian Harry Alan Towers' Towers of London (with his wife Maria Rohm), Canadian Gary Howsam's Greenlight Film and Television Entertainment (GFT Entertainment), and Italian Fulvio Lucisano's Italian International Film. They were also both directed by Mark Roper, produced by Canadian Lewin Webb (who worked for Howsam at GFT Entertainment), and written by Peter Welbeck (Towers' pen name) and Peter Jobin.

High Adventure was filmed first during the summer of 2000 in Bulgaria, as a co-production with Evgeni Mihailov's Boyana Film Company. The plot deals with Chris Quatermain (Griffith), grandson of famed explorer and adventurer Allan Quatermain, who teams up with a German archaeologist, Hope Gruner (Anja Kling), and an Englishman, Johnny Ford (Harry Peacock), to find Alexander the Great's lost treasure. High Adventure was picked up for limited distribution in North America by Canadian company Prophecy Entertainment, and in the United Kingdom by British financing company Future Film Group. It had a two-day premiere screening in February 2001 at the AMC Theater in Santa Monica, California. However, the film was released on DVD only in Europe; for its German release by E-M-S in October 2001 it was retitled Quatermain - Der Schatz der Könige (Quatermain - The Treasure of Kings), while in France it was retitled Les aventuriers du trésor perdu (Adventurers of the Lost Treasure).

The Sea Wolf was next filmed in the fall of 2000 in Cuba, as a co-production with Camilo Vives' Productora Cinematografica Instituto Cubano del Arte e Industria Cinematográficos (ICAIC). Griffith was not the producers' original choice for the role, who had initially cast Mark Dacascos, when the film was to be co-produced by another financier, Amco Entertainment Group. The plot deals with boat Capitan Jeffery Thorpe (Griffith), an ex-United States Navy and self-proclaimed pirate, who comes across a map of Montezuma's treasure shown to him by a mysterious Columbian woman, Helena (Gerit Kling, who also plays her twin sister Marlena), and the two must find it before The Colonel (Barry Flatman) claims it for his own. The Sea Wolf was also picked up for limited distribution in North America by Canadian company Prophecy Entertainment, and in the United Kingdom by British financing company Future Film Group in 2001. It was later distributed by Canadian company Cinemavault Releasing, which arranged for a television premiere in January 2003, and a VHS and DVD release under the alternative title SeaWolf: The Pirate's Curse via The Asylum in July 2003. It was later re-issued on DVD by Echo Bridge Home Entertainment in 2004, also under its alternative title.

=== Continued co-starring roles and return to theater (2000–2002) ===
Griffith had a co-starring role in Laura Ingalls Wilder's biopic sequel Beyond the Prairie II: The True Story of Laura Ingalls Wilder Continues, which was produced by Dori Weiss' D.W. Productions and financed by CBS. In the movie, Griffith plays the role of a drifter, Cornelius Loudermilk, who is offered work on Wilder's (portrayed by Meredith Monroe) farm when her husband, Almanzo Wilder (portrayed by Walton Goggins) gets sick. The teleplay, written and produced by Stephen Harrigan, was directed by Marcus Cole and filmed around Austin, Texas (including Spicewood, Texas) in March–April 2001. Beyond the Prairie II: The True Story of Laura Ingalls Wilder Continues was scheduled to air in November 2001, but it was postponed due to the Emmys' broadcast on CBS; it finally aired four months later in March 2002.

With Greg Mellott, he co-wrote the psychological thriller Black Point, in which he also co-starred; the film starred David Caruso and Susan Haskell, and also co-starred Miguel Sandoval and Gordon Tootoosis. Filmed from April to May 2001 in Victoria, Deep Cove, Fernwood, and Brentwood Bay, British Columbia (standing in for Washington), the plot deals with John Hawkins (Caruso), a divorced father whose life has been derailed when his daughter went missing years prior. He befriends and falls in love with Natalie Travis (Haskell), a woman who has moved into the little coastal town in which he lives, but soon learns that her partner is Gus Travis (Griffith), a criminal who is physically abusive to her. Through a series of double-cross and deception, Natalie uses Hawkins to get rid of Travis and get away with the money he is laundering for mobster Malcolm (Sandoval).

Black Point was directed by David Mackay, produced by Canadian producer Raymond Massey (grandson of actor Raymond Massey) through Massey Productions and Black Point Films, and had financing and distribution via Promark Entertainment Group/Das Werk AG Company and HBO. Although announced as a television film, it was screened at several festivals and events starting in October 2001. At the fifth annual Marco Island Film Festival in October 2002, the film won the Best Feature Thriller award. It was eventually released on VHS and DVD in 2002, in Canada via Videal/Universal Studios/Remstar, and in the United States via CityHeat Productions/Artisan Entertainment.

Griffith was then hired by producer Edgar Lansbury to co-star in Cohort Productions' drama film Italian Lessons, which was planned to be shot during the summer of 2001. The film was described by the production company as "a witty drama of a Brooklyn youth confronting his origins and growing up." The financing and distribution were to come from Moonstone and Overseas Film Group, but it fell through and the film was never made.

The actor returned to stage work in late July 2001, when he began rehearsals for Reprise! Theatre Company's production of 1776, a Hollywood revival of the musical about the Declaration of Independence, staged for its Reprise! Broadway's Best series. The play was directed by Gordon Hunt and starred Orson Bean as Benjamin Franklin, Roger Rees as John Adams, Griffith as Thomas Jefferson, Marcia Mitzman Gaven as Abigail Adams, and Beth Malone as Martha Jefferson. It ran for a planned week and a half, from September 4–16, 2001 at UCLA's Freud Playhouse.

Reuniting with director Rob Cohen (who had written and directed the pilot for The Guardian in 1997), Griffith was given a featured part in the spy-action flick xXx, in which he portrays NSA Agent Jim McGrath, who gets shot during the opening scene while running through a Rammstein concert; his dead body is then passed around via crowd surfing. Griffith's scenes were filmed between December 2001 and March 2002, in Prague, Czech Republic, where most of the movie is set. The film, which stars Vin Diesel and co-stars Samuel L. Jackson, Asia Argento, and Marton Csokas, was produced for Revolution Studios and released by Columbia Pictures and Sony Pictures in August 2002. Footage from xXx is used extensively throughout Rammstein's music video for "Feuer frei!", which was also directed by Cohen, including Griffith's dead body crowd surfing which can be seen toward the end. The song was released as a single in October 2002, and the music video was included as a bonus feature on an enhanced section of the "Feuer frei!" CD single. The music video was also later included on Rammstein's DVD Lichtspielhaus, which was released via Motor Music, Republic Records, and Universal Music in December 2003, and the Blu-ray edition of xXx.

Griffith next co-starred in the cyberpunk science fiction action film Timecop 2: The Berlin Decision (a sequel to Jean-Claude van Damme's 1994 film Timecop), which was shot at the Universal Studios Lot in Universal City, California between March and April 2002. In the sequel, van Damme's role is replaced by Time Enforcement Commission agent Ryan Chang, portrayed by Jason Scott Lee. Griffith plays Brandon Miller, another Time Enforcement Commission agent with altruistic ideals, who travels back in time to assassinate Adolf Hitler. Chang and Miller get into physical fights in different periods of time as the former realizes the latter is out to erase his lineage, thereby making him non-existent. Griffith's wife, Keller, plays the role of Doc and John Beck also co-stars as director O'Rourke. The film was produced by Mike Elliott and Gary Scott Thompson (the latter of whom also wrote the screenplay), and directed by Steve Boyum, as a direct-to-video release by Universal Studios' Universal Home Entertainment Productions, and was released on VHS and DVD in September 2003.

=== Periodic supporting roles in television and theater (2002–2007) ===
After filming wrapped for Timecop 2: The Berlin Decision in April 2002, Griffith took a year-and-a-half hiatus from acting. From then on, he only sporadically appeared in television and theater productions. In late 2003, he landed a semi-recurring role in the first season of The WB's teen drama series One Tree Hill, portraying Peyton Sawyer's (played by Hilarie Burton) adoptive father, Larry Sawyer. In the series, Sawyer was often away due to working on a boat, so his character only appeared in a sparse five episodes during the first season: "The Living Years" (which aired in January 2004), "Crash Course in Polite Conversations" (February 2004), "Spirit in the Night" (April 2004), "To Wish Impossible Things" (April 2004), and "The Leaving Song" (May 2004). The character was omitted from the series second season because the writers felt that Griffith and Burton's on-screen chemistry and energy came off as "too flirty". When the character was re-introduced in the third season, Griffith was replaced by Kevin Kilner.

In January 2004, he again returned to stage work to appear in a one-night-only revival of the musical I'm Getting My Act Together and Taking It on the Road at the Freud Playhouse in Los Angeles (the play went on January 26, the night before his first episode of One Tree Hill aired). Directed by Kay Cole for Reprise! Theatre Company's Marvelous Musical Monday series, the play starred Sharon Lawrence as Heather, a middle-aged woman who wants to make a comeback musical show of her own material but is discouraged by her manager, Joe Epstein (Griffith).

In October 2004, Tobinworld published the cookbook Recipes from the Stars Cookbook, which included one recipe each from Griffith and Keller, along with fun anecdotes, facts, and pictures from each of the nearly one hundred contributors. The book was in development since 1996, and was put together as a fund raiser to benefit Tobinworld, a non-profit special education school for autistic and other special needs children and adults in Glendale, California.

After another year-and-a-half off, he appeared in a guest supporting role on TNT's prime-time police procedural television series The Closer, in the first season episode "The Butler Did It." The episode was directed by Tawnia McKiernan and aired on August 15, 2005. Griffith played the role of Deputy District Attorney Thomas Yates who joins an investigation into the apparent suicide of an affluent family's butler, on trial for murder, when the police department and district attorney's office are not convinced of his guilt.

Around the same time, he had a featured role in another one-night-only revival of the stage musical Camelot, based on the legend of King Arthur and the Knights of the Round Table. Coincidentally, like the year before, the play went on the night before his episode of The Closer aired, on August 14, 2005, at the Hollywood Bowl. Directed by Gordon Hunt, Griffith was cast as Dinadan, with the lead of King Arthur played by Jeremy Irons. The rest of the cast also included Melissa Errico, Paxton Whitehead, James Barbour, Orson Bean, Malcolm Gets, Anthony Meindl, and Kevin Earley.

Another year and a half went by before he guest co-starred in a season four episode of CBS's prime-time police procedural crime drama television series Cold Case. The episode, "The Red and the Blue", which aired on December 10, 2006, reunited Griffith with Timecop 2: The Berlin Decision director Steve Boyum. The story follows an investigation into a cold case murder of a Tennessee musician when his three-piece country band, The Sugar Boys, played in Philadelphia six years earlier. Griffith portrays Mitch, a sleazy booking agent and club owner in Philadelphia, one of the many suspected of the crime after he is accused by his wife of murdering the musician.

In mid-2007, Griffith and Judd Nelson were cast as co-stars supporting Amy Carlson in the suspense thriller film Black Friday (later retitled The Kidnapping). The plot deals with two dirty cops, Cash (Griffith) and Glen (Nelson), who kidnap the daughter of bank security expert Rachel McKenzie (Carlson) and demand as ransom that she crack her bank's high-tech security system in order to retrieve some incriminating evidence hidden in a dead cop's safety deposit box. The movie was directed by Arthur Allan Seidelman and produced through Alpine Medien Productions (operated by producers Robert Halmi, Kevin Bocarde, Brian J. Gordon, Nick Lombardo, and Michael Moran), in association with Larry Levinson's Larry Levinson Productions. The Kidnapping was distributed via RHI Entertainment and had its American premiere on the Lifetime Movie Network television channel in February 2008. It was later released on DVD under its original title, Black Friday, by Paramount Home Video Entertainment.

His final acting role was as a supporting character, playing the Russian Alexander Molokov in the one-night-only revival of the stage musical Chess, which went on at the John Anson Ford Amphitheatre in Los Angeles on September 17, 2007. The play, which tells the story of two chess players during the Cold War, was produced and directed by Brian Michael Purcell as a benefit for Broadway Cares/Equity Fights AIDS. Chess starred Kevin Early, Tom Schmid, Matthew Morrison, Susan Egan, and Cindy Robinson. Another project Griffith worked on in 2007, was a film titled Pre-K, which he wrote, produced, and directed, and which features Kevin Early.

=== Focus on writing and producing (2007–2020) ===
After appearing in Chess in September 2007, Griffith retired from acting to focus on writing. In addition to his credited screenplays, he had also done a number of uncredited re-writes over the years and wanted to settle down as a writer and spend more time with his sons. In 2007, he began working on a film vehicle for comedian George Lopez, Brownie Master. The plot involves the comedian as a workaholic and widowed single father, who takes his teenage daughter to Brownie camp and gets involved with the outdoors. The movie was produced through Lopez's Encanto Enterprises, directed by William Dear, and filmed at the YMCA Camp Howdy in Port Moody, British Columbia, Canada in September 2008. Briefly retitled to Operation Troop Master, then to Mr. Troop Mom, the film premiered on Nickelodeon on June 19, 2009, and was released and distributed via Warner Home Video on DVD and Blu-ray on June 23, 2009.

In the mid 2000s, Griffith went to see John Carpenter and his wife, producer Sandy King, at their Storm King Productions office to pitch an idea for a new project. He proposed a story about a defrocked priest who has the gift of discernment - someone with the ability to see pure innocence and true evil, take the latter into themselves, and dissolve it - but with the added catch that while the evil is inside him, he becomes that demon/evil before it is dissolved. Carpenter and King were impressed with the premise, as it was not something they had seen used in film before, and King felt it gave a new twist to the Dr. Jekyll and Mr. Hyde character and story. The three of them continued developing the plot together, with Griffith and King taking on the job of writing a pilot episode to pitch to networks as a new television series titled Asylum. King also suggested splitting up the priest's role into two characters for dramatic effect: one as the former priest with the gift of discernment, and another as a Los Angeles Police Department Detective to help with the investigation and who internalizes the demon before it is dissolved. After coming up with the several story arcs, characters, and settings, taking much inspiration from the Book of Revelation and the Bible, the trio proposed the Asylum pilot to television network executives but were turned down because it was deemed too dark. The project was shelved for several years.

In April 2011, Carpenter, King, and Griffith decided to tempt the networks again with their supernatural horror series Asylum, since they felt that other shows being produced at the time had broken new grounds. They formed a new partnership, Storm Tiger Enterprises, an imprint of Storm King Productions. To help convey their vision with the network executives, King and Griffith had elaborate storyboards created which illustrated scenes that looked similar to a comic book. Although several major studios showed initial interest in the series, King later stated she felt they were more interested in using Carpenter's name for publicity and had no intention of respecting the artistic integrity and vision of the project. During a development meeting with a major television network which had agreed to co-produce the series, an assistant executive insisted that the show be filmed in a sleepy little town in the Carolinas, instead of the planned Los Angeles, so that it would cost less money by using non-union film workers. King was adamant about filming on location in Los Angeles because of the city's Santa Ana winds, which make the city's skies look as if it is on fire, and because of the tongue-in-cheek reference to Lucifer being loose in "the city of angels." When the same assistant pushed that the cinematography of the show did not need to match that of the storyboards and art pieces provided because they were not making a comic book, King became disenchanted with the television prospect, and ended the meeting.

Griffith and King spent the next two years developing the Asylum project into a comic book, initially hoping to produce it in cooperation with an established publisher, but King ultimately formed the Storm King Comics division to keep full control over its artistic vision. Although Griffith, King, and Carpenter all pitched in with creating the three-arc story-line and the outline of each issue, comic book writer Bruce Jones does most of the bulk writing. They also hired such illustrators as Leonardo Manco, Tom Mandrake, Trent Olsen, and Mariana Sanzone. Asylum's first issue was released on May 29, 2013, distributed by Diamond Comic Distributors in North America and the UK. On October 29, 2014, Volume 1 of the Asylum series was released in hardback, which contains the first six issues of the series (the entire first arc), with an additional prequel not found elsewhere. On May 25, 2016, the fourteenth issue was released, bringing the second arc of the series to a close; Volume 2 was released in hardback on October 11, 2016, which contains the entire second arc of the series (issues seven to fourteen). Asylum's third arc has been planned and written for some time but is delayed because a new illustrator needs to be secured.

In 2012, Keller was invited by one of the showrunners to appear in the second season episode "The Other Side" of NBC's fantasy police procedural drama horror television series Grimm. This led Griffith and Keller to write the episode "Natural Born Wesen" for the program, which was filmed later that same season, and aired on March 15, 2013. Griffith went on to write a total of fourteen episodes by the series' end. This included the season 3 episodes "Cold Blooded" (aired December 13, 2013), "Eyes of the Beholder" (January 14, 2014), and "My Fair Wesen" (May 2, 2014); the season 4 episodes "The Last Fight" (November 7, 2014), "Wesenrein" (January 16, 2015), "Bad Luck" (March 20, 2015), and "Cry Havoc" (May 15, 2015); the season 5 episodes "Clear and Wesen Danger" (November 6, 2015), "Eve of Destruction" (January 29, 2016), "Key Move" (March 4, 2016), and the second portion of the two-part episode "The Beginning of the End" (May 20, 2016); and the season 6 episodes "Oh Captain, My Captain" (January 20, 2017) and "Blood Magic" (March 10, 2017).

For Grimm's fourth season, Griffith worked as story editor on all twenty-two episodes (along with fellow story editor Michael Golamco), in addition to the four episodes he authored; Keller was also offered the job but turned it down for a recurring role in Chasing Life. For the program's fifth season, he became co-producer and worked on all twenty-two episodes (while Golamco was promoted to executive story editor). For the series sixth and final season, he was promoted to supervising producer and worked on all thirteen episodes. Griffith worked on a total of 61 Grimm episodes during his five years on the show.

After Grimm wrapped up in 2017, he and Keller co-created the drama television series The Dunnings, which romanticizes Griffith's family and his mother's dance school, The Griffith Academy of Dance. The press release described the show as "The Dunnings revolves around a prominent Connecticut family. When the matriarch passes away, her youngest daughter returns home to take over the dance school that her mother ran for 40 years and, in doing so, embarks on a journey to redefine the American dream." In October 2017, Griffith and Keller teamed up with Grimm's executive producers Sean Hayes and Todd Milliner and their company, Hazy Mills Productions, to bring the hour-long show into development. The producer made a deal with Universal Television and NBC, but The Dunnings was never made.

In 2018, the couple collaborated to write the sixth episode of Dolly Parton's comedy drama anthology series Dolly Parton's Heartstrings for Netflix. Co-produced by Parton's Dixie Pixie Productions and Sam Haskell's Magnolia Hill Productions, along with producer Patrick Sean Smith, the series presents Parton's songs into televised stories. Griffith and Keller penned the episode "Sugar Hill," which recounts the long relationship of an elder couple together since childhood, starring Timothy Busfield, Patricia Wettig, Virginia Gardner, and Tom Brittney. It was directed by Lev L. Spiro, and was filmed in Georgia between September 2018 and January 2019; it was released (simultaneously with the entire series) on November 22, 2019.

After The Dunnings fell through, Griffith and Keller co-created another television series, the political thriller drama The Translator's Daughter. The press release described the show as "A thriller about an American college student who, while interning for the CIA, finds herself torn among the loyalty to her country, the female crime boss protecting her and the young New York detective with whom she's fallen in love." In October 2019, the couple teamed up again with Hayes and Milliner's Hazy Mills Productions to co-produce the show, in a deal with Universal Television and NBC, but The Translator's Daughter was never made.

In 2019, Griffith and Keller reunited with Dolly Parton's Dixie Pixie Productions and Sam Haskell's Magnolia Hill Productions to help as consulting producers on the Christmas musical film Dolly Parton's Christmas on the Square. Directed and choreographed by Debbie Allen, it was filmed in Georgia and stars Parton, Christine Baranski, Jenifer Lewis, Treat Williams, Jeanine Mason, and Josh Segarra. The plot follows the wealthy Regina Fuller (Baranski), returning to her hometown to evict the residents and sell the land to a mall developer, but ultimately has a change of heart. The movie premiered on Netflix on November 22, 2020. At the 73rd Primetime Emmy Awards, Dolly Parton's Christmas on the Square won the award for Outstanding Television Movie.

=== Return to acting and continued writing and producing (2021–present) ===
On December 21, 2020, Griffith took part of the Reunited Apart videocast that included most cast members of The Karate Kid series. In 2021, Griffith came out of his retirement from acting to reprise the role of Terry Silver in the fourth, fifth, and sixth seasons of Cobra Kai. He also voiced his character in the 2022 video game Cobra Kai 2: Dojos Rising.

Griffith and Keller reunited with Dolly Parton's Heartstrings producer Patrick Sean Smith in 2022, who had been named new showrunner for the upcoming fifth season of Netflix's romantic drama series Virgin River. Griffith and Keller were brought in as supervising producers (working on all twelve episodes of the season), and also co-wrote the episode "Heroes Rise," which was directed by Martin Wood. The series is filmed in and around Vancouver, British Columbia, Canada; filming for the fifth season began on July 18 and concluded on November 21, 2022, but was only released a year later on September 7, 2023. In April 2023, Griffith and Keller were promoted to co-executive producers for the show's sixth season, which was filmed between February 22 and May 31, 2024. Season six was released on December 19, 2024, and includes another episode penned by the couple, "Love Story," directed by Felipe Rodriguez. Griffith and Keller have been announced as writing and co-executive producing the ten episodes for season seven, which will be released in March 2026.

== Personal life ==
Griffith started dating his Another World co-star Mary Page Keller in late 1984, and the couple eventually married on November 16, 1991. The pair have two sons together.

== Filmography ==
=== Film ===
| Year | Film | Role | Notes |
|---|---|---|---|
| 1989 | The Karate Kid Part III | Terry Silver | |
| 1991 | Night of the Warrior | —N/a | writer and producer |
| 1991 | Ulterior Motives | Jack Blaylock | also writer and producer |
| 1992 | Excessive Force | Terry McCain | also writer and producer |
| 1994 | Crackerjack | Jack Wild | |
| 1994 | Blood of the Innocent | Frank Wusharsky | |
| 1995 | Kick Time! | —N/a | writer, producer, and director |
| 1996 | Hollow Point | Max Parrish | |
| 1996 | Behind Enemy Lines | Mike Weston | |
| 1997 | Kull the Conqueror | Taligaro | |
| 1998 | Vampires | Jan Valek | |
| 1999 | Avalanche | Neal Meekin | also writer and producer |
| 2000 | For the Cause | Evans | |
| 2001 | High Adventure | Chris Quatermain | |
| 2001 | The Sea Wolf | Jeffery Thorpe | |
| 2001 | Black Point | Gus Travis | also writer |
| 2002 | xXx | Jim McGrath | |
| 2003 | Timecop 2: The Berlin Decision | Brandon Miller | |
| 2007 | Pre-K | —N/a | writer, producer, and director |
| 2020 | Dolly Parton's Christmas on the Square | —N/a | consulting producer |

=== Television ===
| Year | Show | Character | Notes |
|---|---|---|---|
| 1984–1987 | Another World | Catlin Ewing | 52 episodes |
| 1985 | Miami Vice | Extra (guy in pool, next to guy on raft in clothes) | 1 episode – "Phil the Shill" |
| 1986 | Telethon of Stars | —N/a | Benefit television special |
| 1988 | In the Heat of the Night | Luke Potter | 2 episodes – "Don't Look Back" (two-part) |
| 1989 | Wiseguy | Roger Totland | 2 episodes – "Le Lacrime d'Amore Part 1: AKA The Four-Letter Word" and "Le Lacrime d'Amore Part 2: AKA There's Plenty of Time," |
| 1990 | Rock Hudson | Rock Hudson | TV movie |
| 1997 | The Guardian | Ray Angelotti | TV pilot |
| 1999 | The Unexpected Mrs. Pollifax | Jack Farrell | TV movie |
| 1999 | "What Do You Say" | Father | Music video by Reba McEntire |
| 1999 | Secret of Giving | Harry Withers | TV movie |
| 2000 | A Vision of Murder: The Story of Donielle | Doug Brister | TV movie |
| 2002 | Beyond the Prairie II: The True Story of Laura Ingalls Wilder Continues | Cornelius Loudermilk | TV movie |
| 2002 | "Feuer frei!" | Jim McGrath | Music video by Rammstein, using footage from xXx |
| 2004 | One Tree Hill | Larry Sawyer | 5 episodes |
| 2005 | The Closer | Thomas Yates | 1 episode – "The Butler Did It" |
| 2006 | Cold Case | Mitch | 1 episode – "The Red and the Blue" |
| 2007 | The Kidnapping | Cash | TV movie |
| 2009 | Mr. Troop Mom | —N/a | TV movie – Writer |
| 2013–2017 | Grimm | —N/a | Writer (14 episodes), story editor (season 4; 22 episodes), co-producer (season 5; 22 episodes), supervising producer (season 6; 13 episodes) |
| 2019 | Dolly Parton's Heartstrings | —N/a | Writer (1 episode) – "Sugar Hill" |
| 2020 | Reunited Apart | Self | 1 episode – "The Karate Kid/Cobra Kai" |
| 2021–2025 | Cobra Kai | Terry Silver | 27 episodes (seasons 4–6) |
| 2023–2025 | Virgin River | —N/a | Writer (2 episode), supervising producer (season 5; 12 episodes), co-executive producer (seasons 6–7; 20 episodes) |

=== Video game ===
| Year | Game | Role | Notes |
|---|---|---|---|
| 2022 | Cobra Kai 2: Dojos Rising | Terry Silver | (voice) |

== Stage ==
| Year(s) | Title | Role | Theater | Notes | Ref. |
|---|---|---|---|---|---|
| 1976 | You're a Good Man, Charlie Brown | non-performing: piano accompanist | South Catholic High School Auditorium | | |
| 1977 | The Legend of the Blarney Stone | Unknown | West Haven Knights of Columbus Hall | December 3 | |
| 1978 | Bye Bye Birdie | Albert Peterson | South Catholic High School Auditorium | March 31–April 1 | |
| 1980–1981 | The Best Little Whorehouse in Texas | various: stage manager, cameraman, football player Aggie #12 | 46th Street Theatre | | |
| 1981 | The First | various: Thurman the Brooklyn Eagle photographer, passenger, Brooklyn Dodgers rookie, Pittsburgh Pirates player | Martin Beck Theatre | October 19–December 12 | |
| 1983 | The Threepenny Opera | Unknown | Guthrie Theater | June 10–July 17 | |
| 1983 | Guys and Dolls | unnamed craps-shooter | Guthrie Theater | July 29–September 18 | |
| 1987 | Gianni Schicchi | Unknown | USC Opera | | |
| 2001 | 1776 | Thomas Jefferson | Freud Playhouse | September 4–16 | |
| 2004 | I'm Getting My Act Together and Taking It on the Road | Joe Epstein | Freud Playhouse | January 26 | |
| 2005 | Camelot | Dinadan | Hollywood Bowl | August 14 | |
| 2007 | Chess | Alexander Molokov | John Anson Ford Amphitheatre | September 17 | |

== Publication ==
| Date | Title | Role | Publisher | Ref. |
|---|---|---|---|---|
| October 2004 | Recipes from the Stars Cookbook | Recipe contributor | Tobinworld | |
| May 29, 2013 | Asylum – Issue 1 | Co-creator, story contributor | Storm King Comics | |
| August 7, 2013 | Asylum – Issue 2 | Co-creator, story contributor | Storm King Comics | |
| October 9, 2013 | Asylum – Issue 3 | Co-creator, story contributor | Storm King Comics | |
| February 12, 2014 | Asylum – Issue 4 | Co-creator, story contributor | Storm King Comics | |
| April 9, 2014 | Asylum – Issue 5 | Co-creator, story contributor | Storm King Comics | |
| June 4, 2014 | Asylum – Issue 6 | Co-creator, story contributor | Storm King Comics | |
| August 6, 2014 | Asylum – Issue 7 | Co-creator, story contributor | Storm King Comics | |
| October 15, 2014 | Asylum – Issue 8 | Co-creator, story contributor | Storm King Comics | |
| October 29, 2014 | Asylum – Volume 1 (Issues 1–6) | Co-creator, story contributor | Storm King Comics | |
| January 7, 2015 | Asylum – Issue 9 | Co-creator, story contributor | Storm King Comics | |
| April 8, 2015 | Asylum – Issue 10 | Co-creator, story contributor | Storm King Comics | |
| July 22, 2015 | Asylum – Issue 11 | Co-creator, story contributor | Storm King Comics | |
| January 13, 2016 | Asylum – Issue 12 | Co-creator, story contributor | Storm King Comics | |
| February 24, 2016 | Asylum – Issue 13 | Co-creator, story contributor | Storm King Comics | |
| May 25, 2016 | Asylum – Issue 14 | Co-creator, story contributor | Storm King Comics | |
| October 12, 2016 | Asylum – Volume 2 (Issues 7–14) | Co-creator, story contributor | Storm King Comics | |
