= James Becket =

American journalist (1936–2026)

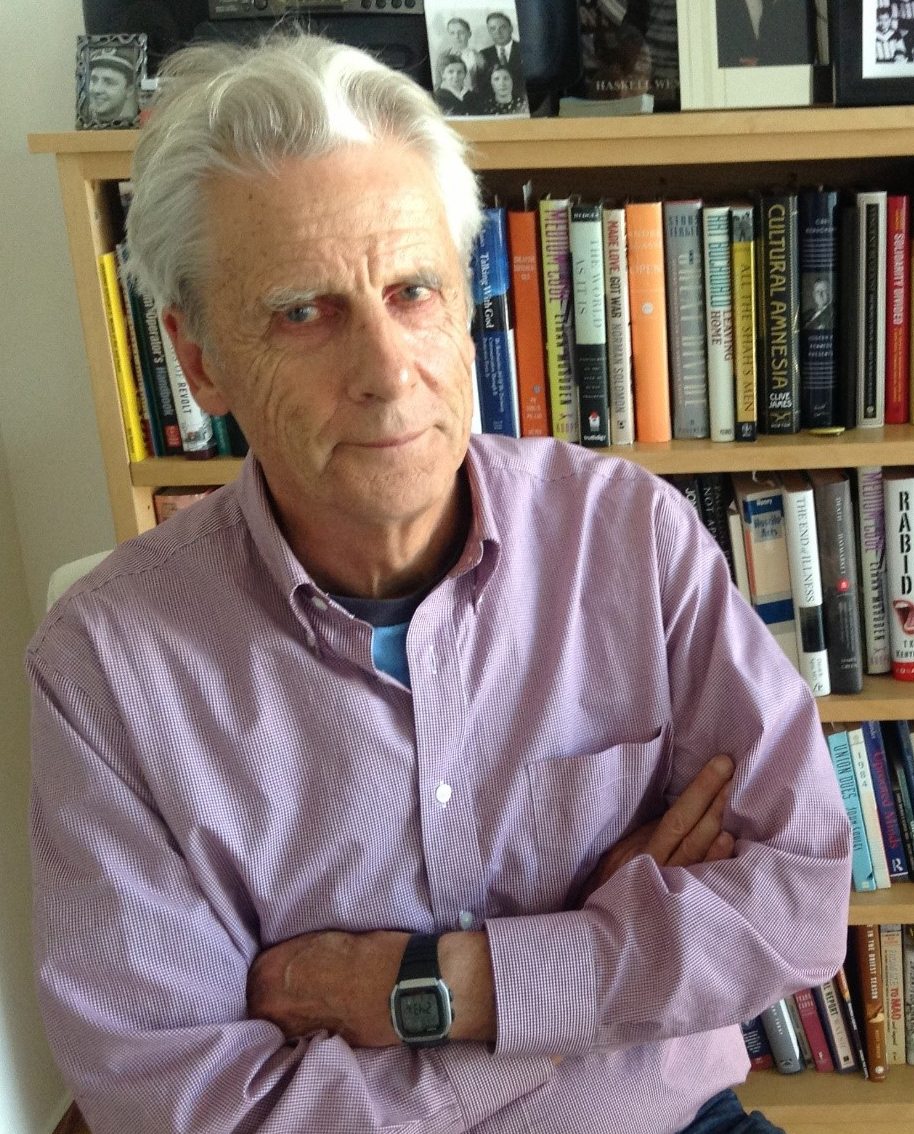
- Becket in 2020
- Born: October 5, 1936; New York City, U.S.
- Died: September 22, 2026 (aged 89)
- Education: Williams College (BA); Harvard Law School; Graduate Institute of International and Development Studies
- Occupations: Writer, filmmaker
- Spouses: Maria Hary Becket; Camilla Denton
- Children: 3

James Becket (October 5, 1936 – September 22, 2026) was an American writer and filmmaker who used documentary film to address issues of social justice and the environment. Previously he wrote, directed, and produced independent feature films and, as a journalist and human rights lawyer, he reported on and engaged with important political events and social problems in Europe and Latin America.

== Life and career ==
=== Education ===
B.A. Williams College (Highest Honors). Becket graduated from Harvard Law School in 1962. Instituto de Economia, University of Chile (Fulbright Scholar), Graduate Institute of International Studies, Geneva, Switzerland.

=== Journalist ===
In the 1960s Becket began writing as a foreign correspondent from Europe, Latin America and Africa. His reports and articles appeared amongst others in The New Republic, The Nation, the New York Times, the Christian Science Monitor, Journal de Genève etc. He also contributed to scholarly journals on issues of land reform, economic development, and international human rights law.

=== Human rights lawyer and the Greek dictatorship ===
In April 1967 a junta of Greek Colonels seized power in Greece. Becket and his Greek wife, Maria Becket became active in the resistance and the international movement to restore democracy in Greece. Amnesty International sent Becket and barrister Anthony Marreco to Athens to investigate alleged human rights violations. Their Report which emphasized the regime's use of torture based on first hand testimony was widely reported in global media. Three Scandinavian countries brought the Greek Case before the European Commission of Human Rights Becket wrote Barbarism in Greece documenting torture and continued writing articles, appearing on television such as the National Broadcasting Company (NBC) and British Broadcasting Company (BBC) in the conflict with the regime over public opinion. When the European Commission was to hold hearings in Strasbourg, the Beckets organized the escapes of torture victims from Greece who gave first hand testimony to the commission. Becket also appeared as a witness. The violation of Article 3 of the European Convention on Human Rights prohibiting torture proved to be a key issue in the commission's decision to condemn the dictatorship leading to its exit from the Council of Europe. Becket was declared persona non grata by the Greek regime.

=== United Nations High Commissioner for Refugees ===
From 1974 to 1981 Becket served as UNHCR's Director of Public Information during a period “characterized by a considerable increase in the scale and scope of the work of UNHCR.” He acted as the spokesperson for the organization and produced news stories and documentaries on the major refugee stories of the day including the Vietnamese boat people, Cambodian refugees fleeing genocide, African refugees fleeing wars and apartheid.

== Filmmaking ==
In 1981 Becket moved to Los Angeles to pursue a film career. His first film was in 1971 in Chile producing the political film Que Hacer with a group of radical Chileans and Americans during the Salvador Allende election. The film put its actors in real life election situations including speaking with Allende in character. The film received mixed reviews and was in numerous film festivals including the Cannes Film Festival. The 1973 coup overthrowing Allende sent the Chileans who worked on the film into exile or to their death. Working with UNHCR, he made a number of documentaries on refugees, including one on Chilean refugees. His writing of screenplays enabled him to expand into directing and producing and his international experience led him to direct movies with progressive political content in Chile (Southern Cross), Thailand (Natural Causes), Nicaragua, Sudan, and Jordan (Sanctuary).

In television, he directed two After School Specials dealing with such themes as child sexual abuse. He also wrote episodes for Miami Vice and Crime Story. In 1999 he created Becket Films and began producing documentary films on health and ecology. In the health field Becket produced films on childhood epilepsy (his young daughter suffered from epilepsy) and stroke recovery. He produced a series of eight films on ship-borne symposia that brought together religious leaders and scientists, long estranged, to find common ground on the issue of the environment. Each symposium, under the Ecumenical Patriarch Bartholomew, ‘The Green Patriarch’, traveled seven bodies of water in ecological jeopardy ranging from the Amazon to the Arctic to the Adriatic. Becket's most recent efforts include Sons of Africa (2014) where the sons of two bitter enemies scale Kilimanjaro on a Peace Climb and The Seeds of Vandana Shiva (2020) recounting the life story of the Indian eco-activist, Dr. Vandana Shiva.

=== Death ===
Becket died on September 22, 2026, at the age of 89.

== Filmography ==
=== Feature films ===
- Que Hacer? (1972) Co-filmmaker, Lobo Films (Directors’ Fortnight, Cannes Film Festival, Critics’ Award, Mannheim).
- Ulterior Motives (1991), Writer/Director, (Thomas Ian Griffith, Ken Howard, Mary Page Keller), Den Pictures,
- Natural Causes (1994), Director, (Linda Purl, Will Patton, Ali MacGraw), (Pacific Rim .Best Foreign Film, Houston Film Festival)
- The Best Revenge (1995) Writer/Director, (Carlos Riccelli, Robert Pine), Becket Films. (Winner Best Feature, Breckenridge Film Festival)
- Plato's Run (1996), Writer/Director, (Roy Scheider, Gary Busey), NuImage Films.
- Southern Cross (1999), Writer/Director/Producer, (Malcolm McDowell, Esai Morales, Michael Ironside), Bon Films.
- Junior Pilot (2006), Writer/Director, (Mark Dacascos, Eric Roberts, Larry Miller), Green Communications.

=== Television ===
- Je Suis un Refugie (1979) Writer/Director, UNHCR, First Prize Cork Film Festival
- Sanctuary,(1982) Writer/Director, PBS, Cindy Awards, Best in Festival awards
- Crime Story (1988) Writer, Going Home 27 February 1988
- Miami Vice (1988) Writer, Heart of Night 31 August 1988
- Big Boys Don't Cry (1992) Director, CBS Schoolbreak Special, Churchill Films, Humanitas Award
- Fast Forward (1994) Director, ABC Afterschool Special, Wild Films, Humanitas Award
- Guns in School (1993) Director, PSA, George Foster Peabody Award.

=== Screenplays ===
Becket wrote 30 screenplays of which ten have been produced.

=== Documentaries ===
- The Aegean: The Apocalypse, (1995) Producer/Director, RSE.
- The Adriatic: A Sea at Risk, A Unity of Purpose (1998), Producer/Director, RSE.
- El Misterio del Capital de los Indigenas Amazonicas, (2002), ILD,
- The Baltic: A Sea in Peril, (2003) Producer/Director, RSE.
- The Amazon: The End of Infinity (2004), Producer/Director, RSE.
- Childhood Epilepsy ‘What you need to know’. (2005)
- Diagnosis Epilepsy: Now what? (2006) Winner 2007 Telly Award
- The Arctic: The Consequences of Human Folly, (2006), Producer/Director, RSE.
- The Green Patriarch, (2008) Producer/Director, RSE, 2008
- Stroke Recovery: Taking Back Our Lives, (2010) Producer/Director, Becket Films.
- The Mississippi: At The Tipping Point (2011) Producer/Director, RSE, 2011
- Sons of Africa,(2014) Producer/Director, Journeyman Pictures. Winner Best Doc, Seattle Independent Film Festival, Borrego Springs Festival
- The Seeds of Vandana Shiva (2020), Producer/Director with Camilla Denton, Becket Films

== Books ==
- (1969) Barbarism in Greece Walker and Company LCCN 7310918 7-310918(also translated and published in Swedish, Italian, Greek, and Turkish)
- (1973) (with Elise Smith) First Amnesty International Report on Torture, Duckworth's,
- (1998) Inca Gold Bantam ISBN 978-1-933390-20-8
- (1992) Murder on the Tour de France Bantam ISBN 0-553-29443-1

== Selected articles ==
(14 May 1962) "Report from a Troubled Colony” The New Republic

(16 May 1964) "Autogestion: Algeria's Socialist Experiment" The Economic Weekly,

(23 May 1964) “Algeria's War Orphans” Christian Science Monitor

(19 July 1966) “Suez, dix ans apres, Les consequences de la nationalisation" Journal de Genève

(29 December 1967) “Chile's Mini-Revolution” Commonweal

(27 May 1968) “Torture in Democracy's Homeland” Christianity and Crisis

(March 1968) “The Real Latin America (photographic essay)” Renewal

(March, 1968) “How I Became National Champion: Letter from Bolivia” Skiing

(6 January 1969) “Greek Junta on Trial” The Nation

April 1970 pp 44–49) “Inquisition Greek style” Ramparts Magazine

(4 August 1972) "Torture as an Institution" New York Times

(March 1978) "The Subjective Camera as Leading Character" American Cinematographer
