= Mary Page Keller =

American actress (born 1961)

- Born: March 3, 1961 (age 65); Monterey Park, California, U.S.
- Occupations: Actress; writer; producer
- Years active: 1982–present
- Known for: Ryan's Hope; Another World; Duet; Baby Talk; Chasing Life; Perry Mason: The Case of the Ruthless Reporter; Venomous
- Spouse: Thomas Ian Griffith (m. 1991)
- Children: 2 sons

Mary Page Keller (born March 3, 1961) is an American actress known for roles on television. She began her career on the daytime soap operas Ryan's Hope (1982–83) and Another World (1983–1985) and later starred in a number of television sitcoms. She starred as Laura Kelly in the Fox comedy series Duet (1987–1989) and in the show's spin-off, Open House (1989–90). Keller later had lead roles in the short-lived sitcoms Baby Talk (1991–92), Camp Wilder (1992–93), and Joe's Life (1993).

In film, Keller is known for her performance in the comedy-drama Beginners (2010). In the 2000s, she had recurring and guest-starring roles in a number of television dramas. From 2014 to 2015, Keller starred as the mother of the lead character in the ABC Family drama series Chasing Life.

== Early life ==
Keller trained at the University of Maryland and the Boston Conservatory of Music before entering the medium of television on the ABC television show Ryan's Hope in 1982. During her times at university, she performed in a number of musical theatre productions, first in Washington, D.C., and later in New York. She later moved to Los Angeles, California.

== Career ==
As a child, Keller participated in productions at Toby's Dinner Theatre under the direction of director Toby Orenstein. She later began her acting career on daytime soap operas. She played Amanda Kirkland (1982–83) on Ryan's Hope and Sally Frame (1983–1985) on Another World. Moving to primetime, she played the part of Laura Kelly on two Fox sitcoms, Duet (1987–1989) and its spinoff Open House (1989–90).

In the late 1980s, Keller and her husband, Thomas Ian Griffith, formed an independent film production company, Ian Page Productions, named after their middle names. They co-produced such films as Night of the Warrior (filmed in 1990 but released in 1991), Ulterior Motives (1991), and Excessive Force (filmed in 1992 but released in 1993).

In 1992, Keller was lead actress in Season 2 of the ABC comedy series Baby Talk. She also starred in another short-lived ABC sitcom, Camp Wilder (1992–93). In 1993, she starred in Joe's Life, also on ABC. During the same years, Keller acted in a number of television films and had a dramatic role in Life Goes On.

As of mid-1990s, Keller has made many guest appearances on television series, including Ellen, The Practice, NCIS, Criminal Minds, 24, Mad Men, Castle, The Closer, CSI: Crime Scene Investigation, Supernatural, Pretty Little Liars and Scandal. She had recurring roles in Cybill, JAG, NYPD Blue, Nip/Tuck, Commander in Chief and Hart of Dixie. She also was regular on Zoe, Duncan, Jack & Jane (1999) and starred as Johnny Kapahala's mother in the Disney Channel original movies Johnny Tsunami (1999) and Johnny Kapahala: Back on Board (2007). She played the lead character's mother in the 2010 comedy-drama film Beginners.

In 2011, Keller was cast as the lead character's mother in the ABC Family drama pilot Chasing Life. In April 2013, ABC Family picked up the pilot to series, for airing in 2014. She co-wrote the family dance school drama, The Dunnings, with husband Thomas Ian Griffith. Keller and her husband recently wrote an episode for Netflix series Virgin River, and before that they wrote the sixth episode of the dramedy series Dolly Parton's Heartstrings in 2019.

== Personal life ==
Keller has been married to her former Another World co-star Thomas Ian Griffith since November 16, 1991. The pair have two sons together, Conner O'Neil Griffith (born June 3, 1994), who is a video artist and animator, and Eamon Michael Griffith (born March 28, 1997), who is a musician.

== Filmography ==
=== Film ===
Year	Title	Role	Notes
1987	Scared Stiff	Kate Christopher	
1988	A Place to Hide	Unknown	
1992	Ulterior Motives	Erica	also co-producer
1997	Any Place But Home	Roberta Dempsey	
1998	The Negotiator	Lisa Sabian	
2001	Venomous	Dr. Christine Edmonton Henning	Direct-to-video
2003	Timecop 2: The Berlin Decision	"Doc"	Direct-to-video
2008	Gigantic	Marguerite Lolly	
2009	Spooner	Joanne Conlin	
2010	Beginners	Georgia	

=== Television ===
Year	Title	Role	Notes
1982–83	Ryan's Hope	Amanda Kirkland	15 episodes
1983–85	Another World	Sally Spencer Frame Hobson Ewing	38 episodes
1986	Kate & Allie	Holly	Episode: "Lucky 13"
1987–89	Duet	Laura Kelly	54 episodes
1988	The Magical World of Disney - The Absent-Minded Professor	Ellen Whitney	TV movie
1989	Those She Left Behind	Sue Grimes	TV movie
1989	The Magical World of Disney - The Absent-Minded Professor: Trading Places	Ellen Whitney	TV movie
1989–90	Open House	Laura Kelly	24 episodes
1990	Revealing Evidence: Stalking the Honolulu Strangler	Sydney Westin	TV movie
1990–91	Life Goes On	Gina Giordano	Episodes: "Libby's Sister" and "Head Over Heels"
1991	Perry Mason: The Case of the Ruthless Reporter	Cassie Woodfield	TV movie
1991	Deception: A Mother's Secret	Amanda Milner	TV movie
1991–92	Baby Talk	Maggie Campbell	23 episodes
1992–93	Camp Wilder	Ricky Wilder	19 episodes
1993	Joe's Life	Sandy Gennaro	11 episodes
1995	The Colony	Leslie Knowlton	TV movie
1995	Picture Perfect	Vicky Walters-Thomas	TV movie
1996	Ellen	Sarah	Episode: "Bowl, Baby, Bowl"
1997	Cybill	Julia Bishop	4 episodes
1998	Dirty Little Secret	Ellie Ramer	TV movie
1999	Zoe, Duncan, Jack and Jane	Mrs. Bean	13 episodes
1999	Johnny Tsunami	Melanie Kapahala	TV movie
2000	Father Can't Cope	Robin	TV movie
2000	Providence	Monica Lang	3 episodes
2001	Emerill	Nora Lagasse	4 episodes
2002	The Practice	Melissa Halpern	Episodes: "Privilege" and "Convictions"
2002–03	JAG	Commander Beth O'Neil / Beth O'Neil	3 episodes: "Offensive Action", "Secret Agent Man" and "Touchdown"
2004	NCIS	Commander Michaela 'Micki' Shields	Episode: "Terminal Leave"
2004–05	NYPD Blue	Brigid Scofield	5 episodes
2004–05	Nip/Tuck	Andrea Hall	3 episodes
2005	Commander in Chief	Grace Bridges	5 episodes
2006	Criminal Minds	Supervisory Special Agent Katherine Cole	Episode: "P911"
2007	Johnny Kapahala: Back on Board	Melanie Kapahala	TV movie
2009	24	Sarah	Episodes: "Day 7: 5:00 a.m.-6:00 a.m." and "Day 7: 6:00 a.m.-7:00 a.m."
2009	Mad Men	Annabelle Mathis	Episode: "The Gypsy and the Hobo"
2010	Castle	Rebecca Dalton	Episode: "Almost Famous"
2011	The Closer	Emily Dixon	Episode: "Repeat Offender"
2011	NCIS: Los Angeles	Angela Tully	Episode: "The Debt"
2012	CSI: Crime Scene Investigation	Leslie Clyborn	Episode: "Seeing Red"
2012	Supernatural	Joyce Bicklebee	Episode: "Out with the Old"
2012	Grimm	Dr. Higgins	Episode: "The Other Side"
2012	Hart of Dixie	Emily Chase	4 episodes
2012, 2013, 2017	Pretty Little Liars	Dianne Fitzgerald	3 episodes
2013	Scandal	Susan Osborne	Episode: "Molly, You in Danger, Girl"
2014–15	Chasing Life	Sara	34 episodes
2015	Bosch	Christine Waters	3 episodes

== Awards and nominations ==
Awards
Year	Award	Category	Production	Result
2003	DVD Exclusive Awards	Best Actress	Venomous	Nominated
2011	Gotham Independent Film Awards	Best Ensemble Performance	Beginners	Won
