= Reunited Apart =

- Genre: Talk show

Creative team
- Created by: Josh Gad

Cast and voices
- Hosted by: Josh Gad

Publication
- No. of seasons: 2
- No. of episodes: 8
- Original release: April 28 – December 21, 2020
- Provider: YouTube

Reunited Apart was a web series created by Josh Gad, first streamed in April 2020. Created during the COVID-19 pandemic, each episode reunites the cast, crew, and related celebrities from a fan-favorite film using video conferencing as Gad interviews them about the film and projects they have done since. Though Gad had initially stated that the series would end with six episodes, he launched a second season in December 2020. The series was aimed to raise money for various charitable efforts.

== Production ==
Gad created the series as a result of being stuck at home during the COVID-19 pandemic, during which he turned to watching films from his childhood which had influenced his own life with his own children. While watching The Goonies, he got the idea of trying to reunite the cast and started reaching out to the film's original stars. They were interested and they further were able to reach out to others related to the film such as Cyndi Lauper who had sung the film's theme song, and Steven Spielberg who had produced the film. Gad considered that many of these films would not be possible to make in the current period of Hollywood and were inventive at their time, and thus worthwhile to explore through this series. Further, Gad felt many of these films lack the cynicism that had built up due to the coronavirus and would help alleviate viewers' morale. He stated, "I thought, 'How great would it be, at a time when people are longing for simple nostalgia, to bring together casts from some of the iconic films that were part of my journey?'"

Since the first episode, Gad has made efforts to try to get all principal casts for the films, but these efforts don't always pan out, such as lacking Crispin Glover for the Back to the Future reunion or Hugo Weaving for The Lord of the Rings episode.

After the sixth episode featuring the Ferris Bueller's Day Off reunion, Gad had stated that was the final episode of the series. However, Gad released the second season's first episode, featuring Wayne's World, as a surprise in December 2020 and promising more episodes to come.

== Episodes ==
=== Season 1 ===
No. overall	No. in season	Title	Original release date
1	1	"The Goonies"	April 28, 2020
Starring Sean Astin, Josh Brolin, Jeff Cohen, Corey Feldman, Kerri Green, Martha Plimpton, Ke Huy Quan, Robert Davi, Joe Pantoliano, Steven Spielberg, Chris Columbus, Cyndi Lauper, and Richard Donner. Funds raised for The Center for Disaster Philanthropy.
2	2	"Back to the Future"	May 12, 2020
Starring Michael J. Fox, Christopher Lloyd, Lea Thompson, Mary Steenburgen, Elisabeth Shue, Claudia Wells, Robert Zemeckis, Bob Gale, Huey Lewis, Alan Silvestri, and J. J. Abrams. Funds raised for Project Hope.
3	3	"Splash"	May 26, 2020
Starring Tom Hanks, Daryl Hannah, Eugene Levy, Brian Grazer, and Ron Howard. Includes a segment hosted by Ryan Reynolds in tribute to John Candy. Funds raised for DigDeep.
4	4	"The Lord of the Rings"	June 1, 2020
Starring Elijah Wood, Sean Astin, Ian McKellen, Billy Boyd, Dominic Monaghan, Orlando Bloom, Peter Jackson, Philippa Boyens, Viggo Mortensen, Andy Serkis, John Rhys-Davies, Sean Bean, Miranda Otto, Karl Urban, Liv Tyler, and Taika Waititi. Funds raise for No Kid Hungry.
5	5	"Ghostbusters"	June 15, 2020
Starring Ivan Reitman, Dan Aykroyd, Bill Murray, Ernie Hudson, Sigourney Weaver, Annie Potts, William Atherton, Jason Reitman, Jennifer Runyon, Steven Tash, Michael Ensign, Timothy Carhart, Ray Parker Jr. and Kumail Nanjiani. Includes a tribute to Harold Ramis. Funds raised for Support Equal Justice Initiative.
6	6	"Ferris Bueller's Day Off"	June 29, 2020
Starring Matthew Broderick, Alan Ruck, Mia Sara, Jennifer Grey, Lyman Ward, Cindy Pickett, Ben Stein, and Jake Gyllenhaal. Includes a tribute to John Hughes. Funds raised for Children of Restaurant Employees.

=== Season 2 ===
No. overall	No. in season	Title	Original release date
7	1	"Wayne's World"	December 7, 2020
Starring Mike Myers, Dana Carvey, Penelope Spheeris, Tia Carrere, Rob Lowe, Ed O'Neill, Lara Flynn Boyle, Michael Hagerty, Colleen Camp, Ione Skye, Lee Tergesen, Charles Noland, Alice Cooper, Brian May, Roger Taylor, Steven Tyler and Joe Perry. Funds raised for the First Responders Children’s Foundation.
8	2	"The Karate Kid/Cobra Kai"	December 21, 2020
Starring Ralph Macchio, William Zabka, Tony O'Dell, Ron Thomas, Randee Heller, Juli Fields, Elisabeth Shue, Robert Mark Kamen, Tamlyn Tomita, Yuji Okumoto, Robyn Lively, Thomas Ian Griffith, and Amy Schumer. Included a tribute to Pat Morita. Funds raised for Action Against Hunger.

== Reception ==
Reunited Apart has been compared favorably to Some Good News, another web series created by John Krasinski that was aimed to raised spirits during the pandemic. Each episode has seen views typically around two to five million, and have generally each raised more than US$100,000 for the individual charities; the Lord of the Rings episode raised more than US$2 million.
