= Natural Causes (1994 film) =

- Directed by: James Becket
- Written by: Jake Raymond Needham
- Produced by: Jake Raymond Needham
- Starring: Linda Purl; Cary-Hiroyuki Tagawa; Will Patton; Tim Thomerson; Janis Paige; Ali MacGraw; Ken Wisan
- Cinematography: Denis Maloney
- Edited by: Richard Fields
- Music by: Nathan Wang
- Production company: Pacific Rim Productions
- Distributed by: Columbia TriStar Home Video
- Release dates: March 5, 1994 (SBIFF); November 7, 1995 (United States)
- Running time: 90 minutes
- Country: United States
- Language: English

Natural Causes is a 1994 American political action thriller film directed by James Becket and written and produced by Jake Raymond Needham. It stars Linda Purl, Ali MacGraw, Cary-Hiroyuki Tagawa, Tim Thomerson and Will Patton.

== Plot ==
A plot involving Vietnamese refugees is linked to the death of an American's mother in Bangkok.

== Cast ==
- Janis Paige as Mrs. MacCarthy
- Ken Wisan as Nguyen
- Joke Tachalom as Guard
- Popin Kukiatton as Ice Cream Vendor
- Tim Thomerson as The Westerner
- Linda Purl as Jessie MacCarthy
- Robert Radford as former Secretary of State Henry Kissinger
- Kenneth Brady as Kissinger's Advisor
- Somsak Pansene as General Giap
- Mathee Sirijantra as Thai Foreign Minister
- Komson Bhibalkul as Security Man
- James Murphy as Diplomat
- Umporn Pankratork as Male Servant
- Ali MacGraw as Fran Jakes
- Kasem Poungkaew as Police Clerk
- Cary-Hiroyuki Tagawa as Major Somchai
- Manop Siangsodsai as Temple Clerk
- Chokechai Tanitkul as Vietnamese #1
- Will Patton as Michael Murphy
- Chalerm Tongkrajang as Vietnamese #2
- Usana Pubhitak as Ticket Agent
- Jeremy Harrington as TV Correspondent
- Natayada Na Songkhl as Tall Man
- Siraya Chunekamrai as Thai Bartender
- Narinporn Narvrin as No #31
- Jerome Gillis as Marine Guard
- Eric Rosser as Embassy Employee
- Marc Anthony as Marine Guard
- Ryan Young as Blond Man

== Release ==
Natural Causes was shown at the Santa Barbara International Film Festival on March 5, 1994. It was released direct-to-video in the United States by Columbia TriStar Home Video on November 7, 1995.

== Reception ==
=== Critical response ===
Emanuel Levy, of Variety states in his review: "Set in Bangkok, Natural Causes is a messy, incoherent political thriller about a young American woman who finds herself in the midst of a plot to assassinate former Secretary of State Henry Kissinger. Pic makes good use of Bangkok's colorful scenery, but its roguish, muddled plot and maladroit, uninvolving direction should take it straight to video domestically, with some possibilities for theatrical release offshore."
