= Fires of Kuwait =

1992 film

- Film poster
- Directed by: David Douglas
- Produced by: Sally Dundas; André Picard; Diane Roberts
- Narrated by: Rip Torn
- Cinematography: David Douglas
- Edited by: Barbara Kerr
- Music by: Michael Brook
- Distributed by: IMAX Corporation
- Release date: 1992
- Running time: 36 minutes
- Country: United States
- Language: English

Fires of Kuwait is a 1992 American documentary film on the Kuwaiti oil fires directed by David Douglas. It was nominated for an Academy Award for Best Documentary Feature. The film was the winner of the 2005 Hall of Fame Award from Giant Screen Cinema Association. The documentary focuses on the international effort to extinguish Kuwait's burning oilfields in the aftermath of the Gulf War.
