= Black Point (film) =

- Directed by: David Mackay
- Written by: Thomas Ian Griffith; Greg Mellott
- Produced by: Raymond Massey
- Starring: David Caruso; Susan Haskell; Thomas Ian Griffith; Gordon Tootoosis
- Cinematography: Stephen F McNutt
- Edited by: Bret Marnell
- Music by: Terry Frewer
- Production company: Promark Entertainment Group
- Release date: 2001
- Running time: 103 minutes
- Country: United States
- Language: English

Black Point is a 2001 thriller/crime-drama film directed by David Mackay and starring David Caruso as an innocent man caught up in a bad situation when criminals attempt to steal the money. It was shot in Victoria, British Columbia, Canada.

At the fifth annual Marco Island Film Festival in October 2002, the film won the Best Feature Thriller award.

== Plot ==
In Black Point, Washington, John Hawkins meets two newcomers to town: a married couple named Gus and Natalie. Unknown to John, the two are bank robbers on the run with a large sum of money from their latest robbery. When John rescues Natalie from a suicide attempt, he sees bruises on her body where Gus has beaten her up. John and Natalie cook and eat a meal, talk about Gus, and end the night by having sex.

When Gus and the rest of the gang return, John and Natalie fight them off. Natalie knocks John out and tapes his hands together, planning to kill him in the woods, but John escapes. Natalie returns to her house, where she injures herself and makes it look like John is the guilty party before phoning the sheriff. It is revealed that over $20,000 of jewelry is missing. Soon, both law enforcement and the criminals are in pursuit of the missing money.

Gus and his cronies find John's friend Standing Bear and torture him for information about John. John takes him to the clinic and is arrested when he leaves. John refuses to cooperate, and in return Natalie says he was not one of the people who robbed her. Lisa, the sheriff and an old lover of John's, knows that she does not have the whole story, but is forced to release John for lack of evidence against him. He goes to visit Standing Bear in the clinic and on leaving is met by two of Gus’s men who want to take him to meet Gus. He tells them to tell Gus he’ll be at Flanagan’s Bar at 2:00. At Flanagan’s, he tells Gus he wants Natalie in exchange for the money. Gus and his men take John and Natalie into the woods, where John overpowers Gus' men and escapes. Natalie escapes by car as Gus realizes she is no longer on his side.

John visits the Sea Vista Campground and finds the bag of money there, then alerts Lisa by phone. All the major players converge on the campground, where Natalie kills Gus and John burns the money in a final showdown. Lisa arrives last and Natalie decides to tell all. She goes to prison and John decides to leave the area for a job interview in San Francisco.

== Cast ==
- David Caruso as John Hawkins
- Susan Haskell as Natalie Travis
- Thomas Ian Griffith as Gus Travis
- Gordon Tootoosis as Standing Bear
- Miguel Sandoval as Malcolm
- Eileen Pedde as Lisa
- Alex Bruhanski as Fred Walker
- Travis Macdonald as Eddy
- Shawn Reis as Logan
- Mike Dopud as Ray
- Gus Lynch as Mike
- John Tench as Kevin
- Allee Friend as Gabrielle
