= Jake Needham (novelist) =

American novelist and screenwriter

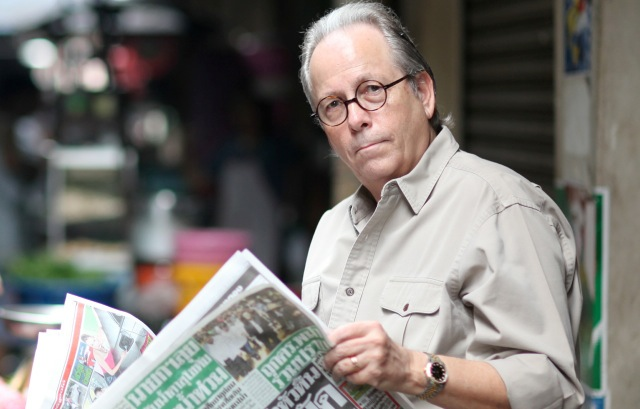
- Born: Jake Raymond Needham; Houston, Texas, U.S.
- Education: Rice University (BA); Georgetown University Law Center (JD)
- Occupation: Writer
- Spouse: Pintuporn Sawamiphakdi
- Children: 2
- Writing career
- Language: English
- Genre: Fiction
- Subjects: Crime and espionage
- Website: www.jakeneedhamnovels.com

Jake Raymond Needham is an American novelist and screenwriter. He is a frequent speaker at schools and universities throughout Asia and guest on Asian television and radio networks. His award-winning English-language crime and espionage novels are set in Asia where he has lived for over thirty-five years, which brings realism and authenticity to his narratives. Bangkok Post called Needham "Michael Connelly with steamed rice." Asia Business magazine said that "Needham certainly knows where some bodies are buried," and Matt Crook] said on CNN Travel that "Needham's stories have a 'ripped from the headlines' feel."

== Personal background ==
Needham was born in Houston, Texas. He graduated from Rice University with a Bachelor's degree in History and Economics and then obtained a Juris Doctor degree in Law from Georgetown University. He has been admitted to the bar in Washington, D.C., New York, and Texas. In addition to Texas, New York, and Washington, D.C., he has also lived in Los Angeles, Thailand, Hong Kong, Singapore, and Sydney, Australia.

Since 1981, Needham has lived and worked in Asia. He is married to Pintuporn Sawamiphakdi, a graduate of Oxford University. She is the former editor of the Thai edition of Tatler magazine and a columnist with the Bangkok Post. They have two sons and have lived in Thailand since 1993.

== Professional background ==
Needham is a novelist and screenwriter. Since 1999, he has published fifteen popular mystery and thriller novels. In 2024, he was presented with the Barry Award at Bouchercon 24, the world's largest convention of mystery and thriller readers, for Best Paperback Original Novel of 2024. He has been a three-time nominee for the Barry Award. He has been the owner of a small television production studio, which allowed him to produce and write television programming. He began writing screenplays, in an effort to improve the profitability of the organization. While he lacked direct experience, his film scripts were often purchased and released on cable network television.

Film

In 1994, he served as the screenwriter and producer of the film Natural Causes, starring Linda Purl, Ali MacGraw, and Cary-Hiroyuki Tagawa. Prior to his death, actor James Gandolfini expressed interest in purchasing the film rights to Needham's book, The Big Mango. Gandolfini wanted HBO Films to produce the work, desiring to star in the film, alongside Demi Moore. When HBO failed to step forward and act on their assertion that they wanted to purchase the rights to the film, the French production house of Canal+ made an offer, which Needham accepted. While Canal+ verbally agreed to retain Gandolfini as the star of the film, they later reneged on their agreement, stating their desire to bring on Tom Cruise as the lead. When Cruise declined, the licensing deal fell through.

Print

Needham is known as one of the best-selling English-language authors in Asia. Until 2012, the print editions of books have been published by Marshall Cavendish Editions in Singapore. While Marshall Cavendish distributed his novels in Asia, Europe, Australia, and the United Kingdom, they are not available in North America. Needham's publishing contract with Marshall Cavendish ended over a disagreement pertaining to the content of his novel, The Umbrella Man. Needham chose to end the contract when his publisher expressed concern that the Singapore government would be offended by the content. Following the termination of their publishing relationship, Needham's work has been published digitally and in paperback editions by Half Penny Ltd. Hong Kong.

== Published works ==
- 1999. The Big Mango, Asia Books Ltd, Bangkok, 378 pages. ISBN 978-9748237367
- 2000. Tea Money (Jack Shepherd # 1), Asia Books Ltd, Bangkok, 378 pages. ISBN 978-9748303468
- 2002. Laundry Man (Jack Shepherd # 1, revised version of Tea Money), Chameleon Press, Hong Kong, 352 pages. ISBN 978-9628631926
- 2003. Killing Plato (Jack Shepherd # 2), Prime Crime Press, Hong Kong, 352 pages. ISBN 978-9746191128
- 2011. The Ambassador's Wife (Samuel Tay #1), Marshall Cavendish, Singapore, 364 pages. ISBN 978-9814328173
- 2012. A World of Trouble (Jack Shepherd # 3), Marshall Cavendish, Singapore, 356 pages. ISBN 978-9814361514
- 2013. The Umbrella Man (Samuel Tay #2), Half Penny Ltd, Hong Kong, 382 pages. ISBN 978-6167611198
- 2014. The Dead American (Samuel Tay #3), Half Penny Ltd, Hong Kong, 305 pages. ISBN 978-6167611228
- 2014. The King of Macau (Jack Shepherd #4), Half Penny Ltd, Hong Kong, 342 pages. ISBN 978-6163359087
- 2016. The Girl in the Window (Samuel Tay #4), Half Penny Ltd, Hong Kong, 324 pages. ISBN 978-616-7611-28-0
- 2017. Don't Get Caught (Jack Shepherd #5), Half Penny Ltd, Hong Kong, 359 pages. ISBN 978-616-7611-30-3
- 2019. And Brother it's Starting to Rain (Samuel Tay #5), Half Penny Ltd, Hong Kong, 382 pages. ISBN 978-616-7611-396
- 2020. Mongkok Station (Samuel Tay #6), Half Penny Ltd, Hong Kong, 394 pages. ISBN 978-6164976139
- 2022. The Nineteen (Jack Shepherd #6), Half Penny Ltd, Hong Kong, 361 pages. ISBN 978-6167611426
- 2023. Who The Hell Is Harry Black? (Samuel Tay #7), Half Penny Ltd, Hong Kong, 354 pages. ISBN 978-616-603-877-4
- 2024. The Detective Gone Gray (Samuel Tay # 8), Half Penny Ltd, Hong Kong, 340 pages. ISBN 978-6166127331
- 2025. GOODBYE, MR. BOOGIE (Samuel Tay #9), Half Penny Ltd, Hong Kong ISBN 978-616-619-860-7
- 2025. HABEAS CORPUS (a Charlie Trust legal thriller, book 1), Half Penny Ltd, Hong Kong ISBN 978-616-629-212-1
- 2026. CONTEMPT OF COURT (a Charlie Trust legal thriller, book 2), Half Penny Ltd, Hong Kong ISBN 978-616-629-944-1
- 2026. HEARSAY TESTIMONY (a Charlie Trust legal thriller, book 3), Half Penny Ltd, Hong Kong ISBN 978-616-630-853-2
- 2026. A JURY OF HIS PEERS (a Charlie Trust legal thriller, book 4), Half Penny Ltd, Hong Kong ISBN 978-616-630-856-3

== Filmography ==
- 1994: Natural Causes – screenwriter and producer
