= Joe's Life =

1993 American sitcom TV series

- Genre: Sitcom
- Created by: Bob Myer
- Starring: Peter Onorati; Mary Page Keller; George DiCenzo; Mimi Kennedy; Robert Hy Gorman; Spencer Klein; Morgan Nagler; Danny Masterson
- Composer: Donald Markowitz
- Country of origin: United States
- Original language: English
- No. of seasons: 1
- No. of episodes: 11 (1 unaired)

Production
- Producers: Nat Bernstein; Mitchel Katlin; Lee Aronsohn; Rita Dillon
- Running time: 30 minutes
- Production companies: Bob Myer Productions; ABC Productions

Original release
- Network: ABC
- Release: September 29 – December 15, 1993

Related
- Camp Wilder; Me and the Boys; Bringing Up Jack

Joe's Life is an American sitcom which aired on ABC from September 29, 1993, until December 15, 1993. The series was created by Bob Myer, and produced by a.k.a. Productions and Bob Myer Productions in association with Buena Vista Television.

== Synopsis ==
The series starred Peter Onorati as Joe Gennaro, a big lug of a husband to Sandy (Mary Page Keller) and father of three who had just been laid off from his executive position at an aircraft factory. Joe was understandably miffed, as he had recently worked his way up to the position after starting out on the assembly line years earlier. His untold period of unemployment brought him the duty of being a domestic 24 hours a day, something he faced with great apprehension. In order to help the family through tough times, Sandy was forced to initially take a day and night job, leaving her away most of the time. Joe did the best he could in his new household responsibilities, but with three growing kids, it was often a wild ride. Fourteen-year-old Amy (Morgan Nagler), the oldest of Joe's brood, was the self-absorbed teen; 12-year-old Paul (Robert Hy Gorman) was the super-confident teenage son, whose hormones always got the best of him; and cute little 7-year-old Scotty (Spencer Klein) was just carefree all the way.

Butting in on all the chaos was Joe's older brother Stan (George DiCenzo), who ran a successful, fancy seafood restaurant with his wife Barbara (Mimi Kennedy). Stan seemed to put Joe down for his choices in life and his lack of career stability, but all his disdain was quieted when he was able to offer Joe a position as an overnight chef at his restaurant. Joe gladly settled into this job, and in turn eased Sandy's schedule as she now only had to work days (primarily as an office temp). Joe still had to play the part of "Mr. Mom" during the day, leading him on a blazing trail of scrapes caused by the kids, but often Sandy would get involved right with him.

Leo (Danny Masterson) was Stan and Barbara's teenage son, who idolized his Uncle Joe, much to the dismay of his parents. Also seen were Joe's friend Frank Ruscio (Al Ruscio) and Ray Wharton (John Marshall Jones), an effete, cultured chef at the restaurant.

== Cast ==
=== Main ===
- Peter Onorati as Joe Gennaro
- Mary Page Keller as Sandy Gennaro, Joe's wife
- George DiCenzo as Stan Gennaro, Joe's older brother
- Mimi Kennedy as Barbara Gennaro, Stan's wife and Joe's sister-in-law
- Robert Hy Gorman as Paul Gennaro, Joe & Sandy's son and second child
- Spencer Klein as Scotty Gennaro, Joe & Sandy's son and third child
- Morgan Nagler as Amy Gennaro, Joe & Sandy's daughter and first child
- Danny Masterson as Leo Gennaro, Stan & Barbara's son and Joe's nephew

=== Recurring ===
- John Marshall Jones as Ray Wharton
- Al Rusico as Frank Rasico
- George Coe as Grandpa
- Kristin Dattilo as Kelly
- Staci Greason as Pregnant Woman

== Episodes ==
No.	Title	Directed by	Written by	Original release date
1	"A Tail to Remember"	Andrew D. Weyman	Bob Myer	September 29, 1993
2	"Mind If I Smoke?"	Gail Mancuso	Michael Poryes	October 6, 1993
3	"He Ain't Working, He's My Brother"	Andrew D. Weyman	Lee Aronsohn	October 13, 1993
4	"Shop in the Name of Love"	Andrew D. Weyman	Tom Szollosi	October 20, 1993
5	"The Bad Influence"	Andrew D. Weyman	Lawrence H. Levy	October 27, 1993
6	"The Invisible Man"	Andrew D. Weyman	Ellen Byron & Lissa Kapstrom	November 3, 1993
7	"You Can't Take This Job...Period"	Andrew D. Weyman	Mitchel Katlin & Nat Berstein	November 10, 1993
8	"Dear Grandpa"	Andrew D. Weyman	Ellen Byron & Lissa Kapstrom	November 17, 1993
9	"Parental Guidance Not Suggested"	Andrew D. Weyman	Story by : Rich Tabach and Adrienne Armstrong & Martie Cook; Teleplay by : Lee Aronsohn & Michael Poryes	November 24, 1993
10	"Yule Be Sorry"	Andrew D. Weyman	Unknown	December 15, 1993
11	"Nightmare on Joe's Street"	TBD	TBD	UNAIRED
