= Ulterior Motives (film) =

1993 action film

- Film Poster
- Directed by: James Becket
- Screenplay by: James Becket
- Story by: James Becket; Thomas Ian Griffith
- Produced by: Mike Erwin; Thomas Ian Griffith; Mary Page Keller; J. Max Kirishima; Gavin MacFayden; Craig Thurman Suttle; Taro Tanabe
- Starring: Thomas Ian Griffith; Mary Page Keller; Ken Howard
- Cinematography: Stephen M. Katz
- Edited by: Virginia Katz
- Music by: Parmer Fuller
- Production companies: Den Music; E.L.K. Productions; Ian Page Productions
- Distributed by: Imperial Entertainment (United States)
- Release date: January 6, 1993; (United States)
- Running time: 95 minutes
- Country: United States
- Language: English

Ulterior Motives, also known as Kill Fee, is a 1993 martial arts action thriller film written and directed by James Becket, starring Thomas Ian Griffith and Mary Page Keller. The film follows Erica Boswell (Keller), a reporter pursuing a story about a businessman who may be selling American secrets to the Japanese. Boswell enlists the help of private detective Jack Blaylock (Griffith) to investigate and the two of them quickly discover that the case is even more complex and dangerous than they thought.

Ulterior Motives had a straight-to-video release in the United States. It was the second collaboration between Griffith and Keller, who had previously co-starred in the soap opera Another World and are married in real life. Griffith also has a story credit and a producer credit, while Keller is credited as a co-producer.

== Plot ==
An American radio broadcast discusses the upcoming vote on an important trade bill. Tensions are high because, if passed, the U.S. would drastically cut their number of Japanese imports.

Erica Boswell is a New York reporter pursuing a story in California about a businessman who may be selling American aerospace technology secrets to Japan. Erica meets a woman named Elizabeth Walthrop, who claims to work with the man, George Sakagami. She informs Erica that Sakagami is scheduled to meet a contact the next day.

To obtain evidence against Sakagami, Erica hires a private detective, Jack Blaylock, to take photographs while she observes the meeting. She and Jack also break into the contact's hotel room to photograph the documents from Sakagami, but the contact, who appears to be a yakuza, returns while they are inside. A fight breaks out, destroying the photos.

Despite losing the photos, Erica publishes the story. Afterward, she visits Sakagami's home to interview him and finds him dead from an apparent suicide. Erica not only feels responsible for his death but is doubtful of the suicide theory, particularly because the money he received from the exchange is missing. When she tries to find out more about Elizabeth Walthrop, she is told that no one by that name has ever worked with Sakagami.

Erica rehires Jack to help her dig deeper into the case and they become romantically involved. One night, Jack asks Erica if she's heard of a legend that says couples who truly love each other in one life are destined to find each other again in the next life. He adds that when the couples re-encounter each other they have a moment of recognition, implying that he experienced such a moment upon meeting Erica. Jack then asks her to abandon the case before the two have sex.

Meanwhile, it is revealed to the viewer that Elizabeth Walthrop, among others, is working with Malcolm (Ken Howard), a pseudo-uncle figure in her life who owns a public relations agency. The group concocted the Sakagami story to shift public opinion and influence the trade bill vote, inciting conflict with Japan that will benefit the U.S.

The following day, Jack visits Malcolm's office. Jack, whose real name is Timothy Calloway, also works for Malcolm, who orders Jack to kill Erica and get her out of their way. That night, Jack attempts to push Erica off the roof of her apartment building, but he is interrupted by another couple, so he plays the event off as an accident.

Erica realizes that she has been set up after she witnesses Elizabeth leaving Malcolm's office. Erica calls and tells Jack, who instructs her to hide in his apartment and write down everything she knows. After Erica hears a message from Malcolm on Jack's answering machine, she realizes the true extent of the setup and how much danger she is in. Booking a flight to New York, she rushes home to pack.

When Erica enters her apartment, she is seized by Malcolm's henchmen before Jack drags her into the bedroom, appearing to viciously slash her with a katana. To Jack's surprise, after obeying his orders, Malcolm arrives and declares that Jack will also be killed to tie up all loose ends. However, after Malcolm leaves, Jack kills both henchmen and it is revealed that Erica is still alive, her death faked using a cadaver and pigs' blood. Erica asks Jack why he spared her. He reiterates his earlier statement about the concept of lovers reuniting across different lifetimes.

When Malcolm learns that Erica and Jack are still alive and trying to obtain documented proof of the real story, he and Elizabeth follow them. When all four arrive at the building where the documents are kept, a gun standoff ensues. Ultimately, Jack kills Malcolm and Elizabeth. He asks Erica to run away with him, but she refuses, feeling obligated to publish everything she knows. Jack sadly accepts her decision and leaves. He says he will "catch her on the next time around," referencing how he still believes they are destined to find and love each other in every lifetime.

== Cast ==
- Mary Page Keller as Erica Boswell
- Thomas Ian Griffith as Jack Blaylock/Timothy Calloway
- Ken Howard as Malcolm Carter
- Ellen Crawford as Elizabeth Walthrop/Cynthia Jones
- M.C. Gainey as Max
- Hayward Nishioka as George Sakagami
- Tyra Ferrell as Casey, Malcolm's receptionist
- Joe Yamanaka as Himself

== Production ==
Ulterior Motives was originally produced and released under the title Kill Fee.

Thomas Ian Griffith and Mary Page Keller star as the main characters of the film, but the former is also credited as a producer and the latter as a co-producer. Griffith is also credited with helping generate the story alongside screenwriter and director James Becket.

Filming locations included the Ennis House (Malcolm's office) and Little Tokyo (Jack's office), both of which are in Los Angeles, California, where the film is set.

== Soundtrack ==
The instrumental soundtrack for this film was composed by Parmer Fuller. Several of the film's vocal tracks, "Forever Love," "I Wanna Hold You Right," and "Satori" are all performed by Joe Yamanaka, who portrayed himself in the movie.

== Reception ==
For the most part, the political commentary and Griffith's performance are praised by viewers, while criticism is directed at the movie's slow pace and emphasis on dialogue over action.

In their review, TV Guide criticized the film for its "static direction" being overly "talky," and how the suspenseful plot was halted by the romance side plot, was but credited for its believable commentary on media hysteria.

Matty Budrewicz of The Schlock Pit wrote that, although he found the film to be too politically focused, the suspense and romantic chemistry were solid and "Griffith effectively submits three stupendous performances across the film’s ninety-one minutes, it’s flabbergasting that New Line ruled him a bust as soon as they did."

Jason Rugaard of Movie Mavericks criticized the film for stoking anti-Japanese paranoia but noted that "The acting from Griffith is strong enough to support the ludicrous writing. He’s like the Mickey Rourke of Martial Arts flicks, understated and sad-eyed, ornery and quick fisted, it’s quite a feat."

The movie review website The Action Elite also reviewed the film, saying that they were disappointed by the lack of action but enjoyed Griffith's, Keller's and Gainey's performances and the suspenseful, unpredictable plot.

The American Martial Arts Film underlines a certain "philosophical" dimension of the film.

== Home media ==
Ulterior Motives was originally released straight-to-video on VHS, and to date, the film has never had an American DVD release. It has, however, been released as a DVD outside of the U.S.

The film was distributed in Swedish as Falska motiv, in German as Teuflische Intrigen, in Italian as Moventi diversi, in French as Force brute, in Hungarian as Japanska veza.
