= Eileen Pedde =

American actress

- Years active: 1990–present

Eileen Pedde is an American actress.

Pedde made her debut in the TV series The Little Kidnappers in 1990. She has appeared in numerous major American television series including The X-Files and Smallville (2003) but is perhaps best known for her role as Gunnery Sergeant Erin Mathias in Battlestar Galactica. She appeared in the 2007 film Juno.

== Filmography ==
- The Little Kidnappers (1990, TV Movie) - Mrs. Hooft
- Nightmare Street (1998, TV Movie) - Young Mother
- The X-Files (1996-1998, TV Series) - Angie / Mrs. Skur
- Welcome to Paradox (1998, TV Series) - Reporter #2
- I'll Be Home for Christmas (1998) Turf 'n Turf Customer #3
- Millennium (1998, TV Series) 'PAIN' Victim / Doctor / Dr. Miriam Greenwald / Karen Jarret
- Our Guys: Outrage at Glen Ridge (1999, TV Movie) - Irate Parent
- Atomic Train (1999, TV Mini-Series) - FEMA Worker
- Deadlocked (2000) - Manager
- A Feeling Called Glory (2000, Short) - Adult Beth Narrator (voice)
- So Weird (2000, TV Series) - Ms. James
- Dark Angel (2000, TV Series) Hannah Sukova
- Da Vinci's Inquest (2000, TV Series) - ER Doctor
- Life or Something Like It (2002) - Stage Manager
- Black Point (2002) - Lisa
- Just Deal (2000–2002, TV Series) - Coleen Roberts
- The Twilight Zone (2002, TV Series) - Joyce Winslow
- Taken (2002, TV Mini-Series) Nora
- Stephen King's Dead Zone (2003, TV Series) - Mrs. Cahill
- Final Destination 2 (2003) - Anesthesiologist
- The Core (2003) - Lynne
- Smallville (2003, TV Series) - Jennifer Small
- Freddy vs. Jason (2003) - School Nurse
- Human Cargo (2004, TV Mini-Series) - Peggy
- Tru Calling (2004, TV Series) - Patricia Norris
- The 4400 (2004, TV Series) - Patty Griffin
- 14 Hours (2005, TV Movie) - CVICU Doctor
- Amber Frey: Witness for the Prosecution (2005, TV Movie) - House Reporter #1
- Stargate SG-1 (2005, TV Series) - Major Gibson
- Neverwas (2005) - Waitress
- Terminal City (2005, TV Series) - Nurse Julie
- Killer Instinct (2006, TV Series) - Eliana Cole
- Kyle XY (2006, TV Series) - Anna Manfredi
- Juno (2007) - Gerta Rauss
- Battlestar Galactica: Razor (2007, TV Movie) - Sgt. Mathias
- Blood Ties (2007–2008, TV Series) - Crowley
- Battlestar Galactica (2006–2008, TV Series) - Sgt. Erin Mathias
- Storm in the Heartland (2009, TV Movie) 0 Colleen
- Life Unexpected (2010, TV Series) - Caseworker
- Supernatural (2010-2016) - Mrs. Frankle / Dr. Kessler
- Fairly Legal (2011, TV Series) - Marsha Neumeier
- Finding a Family (2011, TV Movie) - Principal Thomas
- Travelers (2016, TV Series) - Mom
- Death Note (2017) - New Teacher
- Parallel (2018) - Librarian
- Reunited at Christmas (2019 Hallmark film) - Claire Murphy
