= Venomous (film) =

2001 film

- DVD cover
- Directed by: Fred Olen Ray (as Ed Raymond)
- Written by: Dan Golden; Sean McGinly
- Produced by: Alison Semenza; Jim Wynorski (as Noble Henry)
- Starring: Treat Williams; Mary Page Keller; Hannes Jaenicke
- Cinematography: Andrea V. Rossotto
- Edited by: Randy Carter
- Music by: Neal Acree
- Production company: Phoenician Entertainment
- Distributed by: 20th Century Fox Home Entertainment
- Release dates: November 29, 2001 (Germany); January 22, 2002 (United States)
- Running time: 97 minutes
- Country: United States
- Language: English

Venomous is a 2001 American direct-to-video disaster horror film directed by Fred Olen Ray, credited as Ed Raymond, and starring Treat Williams, Mary Page Keller and Hannes Jaenicke.

== Plot ==
In 1991, a group of Iraqi commandos penetrate a secret American government lab, releasing genetically modified rattlesnakes. Over the following years, the snakes breed and multiply. In the present day, an earthquake drives them from the underground to the surface, and the snakes infect whoever they bite with a fatal virus. A small-town doctor tries to correct the situation, but the government wants to hide the traces of its wrongdoings. At the end of the movie, the Snake's lair is located and destroyed by an explosion, killing apparently all rattlesnakes. But the last scene shows a rattlesnake who survived.

== Cast ==
- Treat Williams as Dr. David Henning
- Mary Page Keller as Dr. Christine Edmonton Henning
- Hannes Jaenicke as Dr. Eric Foreman
- Catherine Dent as Susan Edmonton
- Geoff Pierson as General Arthur Manchek
- Tony Denison as Major General Thomas Sparks
- Brian Poth as Billy Sanderson
- Jim Storm as Sheriff Jack Crowley
- Marc McClure as Dr. Dutton
- Andrew Stevens as Daniel Andrews
- Anthony Azizi as Male Terrorist
- Greg Collins as Grover
- Lee de Broux as Bob Jenkins

== Reception ==
TV guide stated, "In its B-movie way, the production succeeds in shaking up fright fans; if it had only talked less and slithered more it might have been a small gem".

The Dutch website Cinemagazine found that, "If there are viewers who have a soft spot for runaway snakes and therefore want to see every film in this subgenre, then Venom may come as a surprise. Furthermore, it is mainly a film that fails to captivate. The acting fails to convey the intended emotions and watching an hour and a half of a search for an antidote is not what you rented the film for."

== See also ==
- List of killer snake films
