= Avalanche (1999 film) =

1999 disaster-action film

- Directed by: Steve Kroschel
- Written by: Steve Kroschel; Thomas Ian Griffith (uncredited); Lars Guignard (uncredited)
- Screenplay by: Steve Kroschel
- Produced by: Steve Kroschel; Richard Pepin; Joseph Merhi; Charles George; John J. Kelly; Alan Peterson; Greg Mellott; Thomas Ian Griffith
- Starring: Thomas Ian Griffith; Caroleen Feeney; R. Lee Ermey; C. Thomas Howell; John Ashton
- Cinematography: Steve Kroschel; Richard Pepin
- Edited by: Stephen Adrianson; Dan Williams
- Music by: Alex Wilkinson
- Production companies: Ian Page Productions; PM Entertainment Group; Kroschel Films
- Release date: 1999
- Running time: 96 minutes
- Country: United States
- Language: English

Avalanche (later released on VHS and DVD as Escape from Alaska) is a 1999 American disaster film directed by Steve Kroschel and starring Thomas Ian Griffith and Caroleen Feeney.

== Plot ==
The survivor of an Alaskan avalanche, environmentalist Dr. Lia Freeman (Caroleen Feeney) is concerned that a similar disaster may occur if a proposed new oil pipeline is built. Freeman adamantly warns the planners of the likelihood of the event, but her pleas fall on deaf ears. As she realizes that a massive whiteout is imminent, Freeman tries to evacuate the citizens of a nearby town, aided by helicopter pilot Neal Meekin (Thomas Ian Griffith).

== Cast ==
- Thomas Ian Griffith as Neal Meekin
- Caroleen Feeney as Dr. Lia Freeman
- R. Lee Ermey as Gary
- C. Thomas Howell as Jack
- John Ashton as Kemp
- Geoffrey Lower as Jay Weston
- Hilary Shepard as Annie (credited as Hilary Shepard-Turner)
- Gary Kasper as Tiny
