= David Douglas (director) =

Canadian cinematographer, director and writer

David Douglas (born 1953) is a Canadian cinematographer, director and writer associated with many IMAX films including Fires of Kuwait, an Academy Award-nominated documentary film. He also wrote and directed For the Cause, starring Dean Cain and Thomas Ian Griffith.

Douglas was recipient of the Kodak Vision Award in 2002.
