= Blood of the Innocent (film) =

- Film poster
- Directed by: Bob Misiorowski
- Written by: Anatoly Niman (Story); Charles Cohen (Screenplay)
- Produced by: Joseph Newton Cohen; Anatoly Fradis; Trevor Short; David Varod
- Starring: Thomas Ian Griffith; John Rhys-Davies; Rutger Hauer; Artur Zmijewski; Bozena Szymanska
- Cinematography: Yossi Wein
- Edited by: Alain Jakubowicz
- Music by: Vladimir Horunzhy
- Production companies: Action Films; Millennium Films; Republic Pictures; Showtime Networks
- Distributed by: Republic Pictures Home Video
- Release date: December 10, 1994; (United States)
- Running time: 95 minutes
- Countries: United States; Poland
- Language: English

Blood of the Innocent (Polish: Anioł śmierci, lit. 'Angel of Death'), also released on video as Beyond Forgiveness, is a 1994 American-Polish direct-to-video film directed by Bob Misiorowski and starring Thomas Ian Griffith, John Rhys-Davies, Rutger Hauer, Artur Żmijewski and Bożena Szymańska. The film premiere on Showtime on December 10, 1994.

== Premise ==
A Chicago cop goes to Poland to get the hoods who killed his brother. He soon discovers that his brother was killed by the Russian mafia, who are killing local peasants and selling their organs on the black market.

== Cast ==
- Thomas Ian Griffith as Detective Frank Wusharsky
- John Rhys-Davies as Captain Shmuda
- Rutger Hauer as Dr. Lem
- Artur Żmijewski as Detective Marty Wusharsky
- Bożena Szymańska as Patty
- Aleksander Wysocki as "Scarface"
- Jan Prochyra as Zelepukhin
- Jerry Flynn as FBI Agent Reed
- Marcin Szpil as Sasha
- Ilona Kucińska as Sasha's Mother
- Dominika Ostałowska as Sonia
- Andrzej Zieliński as Bielski
- Stanisław Brejdygant as Morsztyn
- Joanna Trzepiecińska as Anna
- Hanna Dunowska as Dr. Lem's Assistant
- Jerzy Karaszkiewicz as Stan, The Bartender
- Leon Niemczyk as Polish Priest
- Witold Dębicki as Polish Bakery Owner

== Reception ==
Website Moria.co gave the film two stars and concluded: "Beyond Forgiveness is routine in most regards, although has some occasional points that make it interesting watching. One of these is that it the filmmakers have actually gone on location and shot in Poland. The shooting around the various castles and markets adds something picturesque and undeniably different to the standard American locations. Misiorowski at least gives a passably credibility to the situation. The plot is not great but the culture clash aspect is effectively conveyed."
