= Excessive Force (film) =

1993 American film by Jon Hess

- Theatrical release poster
- Directed by: Jon Hess
- Written by: Thomas Ian Griffith
- Produced by: Oscar L. Costo; Thomas Ian Griffith; Erwin Stoff
- Starring: Thomas Ian Griffith; Lance Henriksen; James Earl Jones; Charlotte Lewis; Tony Todd; Burt Young
- Cinematography: Donald M. Morgan
- Edited by: Alan Baumgarten
- Music by: Charles Bernstein
- Production companies: 3 Arts Entertainment; Ian Page Productions
- Distributed by: New Line Cinema
- Release date: May 14, 1993; (United States)
- Running time: 87 minutes
- Country: United States
- Language: English
- Budget: $13 million
- Box office: $1,152,117 (USA)

Excessive Force is a 1993 American action film. It was directed by Jon Hess, written, co-produced and starred by Thomas Ian Griffith and released by New Line Cinema. Despite being panned by critics and becoming a box office bomb, the film had a direct-to-video sequel, called Excessive Force II: Force on Force (1995), that bears no relation to this film and does not follow its storyline.

Shot on location in Chicago between March and April 1992, Excessive Force was released in May 1993.

== Plot ==
Terry McCain is a detective with the Chicago Police Department. One night, he and his team are involved in a drug bust on the Italian mafia that ends in a chaotic shootout and three million dollars of the mob’s money going missing. Terry interrogates one of the gangsters and coerces him into admitting that the infamous crime boss DiMarco, Terry’s nemesis, is the one behind the drug exchange. However, because of the excessive force used in obtaining the confession, it doesn’t hold up in court and DiMarco is allowed to walk free. Terry’s captain, Devlin, who is soon to become chief, tells Terry that he has to get his violent tendencies under control because it has lost them multiple convictions and hurts Devlin’s image.

Terry, who lives above his friend Jake’s jazz club, Déjà Vu, is separated from his girlfriend Anna, a model. That night is Terry’s birthday, and he notes that she doesn’t call; he is also surprised that his fellow detective and friend Dylan doesn’t visit or call to acknowledge the occasion. Meanwhile, DiMarco has sent his men to find the missing money, believing it to be in possession of one of the cops from the bust. Their first stop is at Dylan’s apartment, where Dylan is kidnapped and his girlfriend is murdered. The following morning, the police investigate Dylan’s apartment, assuming him to be dead after discovering his girlfriend’s body. Devlin warns Terry to stick closely to his fellow cops, since the mob is likely coming after them next.

Dylan’s body is discovered in a landfill soon after. Devastated and enraged, Terry bursts into one of the mob’s private clubs looking for DiMarco, assaulting a number of other gangsters in the process. Unable to locate DiMarco that night, Terry breaks into Anna’s apartment to get drunk and play her piano. Anna, confused by his unannounced intrusion after three months, is angry until Terry reveals that Dylan is dead. Soon after, another detective and friend of his, Frankie, is also killed in an explosion, and Devlin gives Terry the go-ahead to do whatever needs to be done to avenge the men and put a stop to the murders. That night, Terry breaks into a cocktail lounge owned by the mafia with the intent to kill DiMarco, but he finds himself unable to do it when he sees how pathetic DiMarco is under the threat of death. He is also surprised when DiMarco tells him to “keep the money,” indicating that he does not have it, and deepening the mystery of where it has gone.

The next morning, Terry and Anna begin to reconcile. As they walk together and discuss going away on a trip, Terry spots a newspaper headline announcing that DiMarco has been found dead. Because of witnesses who saw Terry at the cocktail lounge that night, he is named as a suspect in the murder. Jake overhears a radio broadcast about the case that not only names Terry, but also leaks information about Anna, which prompts Terry to rush to her place and make sure that she’s alright. A gangster visits her apartment in disguise and tries to pull a gun, and after Terry successfully knocks him out, he whisks Anna to a remote farmhouse for her protection.

Terry and Devlin arrange a meeting, but when Terry arrives, he is ambushed by the mafia. After he escapes, he passes by the Déjà Vu club and sees Jake talking to a couple of gangsters. The events of the day lead Terry to conclude that Devlin is a dirty cop and that he and Jake have betrayed him. While police all over the city look for him, Terry visits another of his friends on the force, Sam, for answers. Sam explains that Devlin and DiMarco had a history of corruption, and Terry realizes that Devlin must have had DiMarco killed to prevent his corruption from being revealed when he became chief.

Back at the farmhouse, Anna mends the wounds that Terry acquired in the ambush and the two have sex. The next morning, they are discovered by the mafia and a shootout ensues. Returning to the city, Terry confronts Jake, who is the only person still alive who knows where the farmhouse was (Dylan and Frankie being the other two), but Jake vehemently denies having betrayed him and kicks Terry out of the club.

Terry tails Devlin to a hotel, where it is revealed that Frankie is still alive and was the one that killed DiMarco. He is working with Devlin and the mob for a share of the missing drug money. Since everyone else has failed to kill Terry, Devlin says that Frankie will have to kill him. Frankie, however, is reluctant to kill his old friend. Later that day, Jake catches Frankie searching Terry’s apartment for Anna’s address so that he can find Terry and kill him. In the ensuing altercation, Frankie shoots Jake, and Terry arrives just in time to call an ambulance and learn from Jake that Frankie is headed toward Anna, who is working on a photoshoot at a friend’s place.

Terry interrupts the shoot and he and Frankie fight until Devlin also shows up, killing Frankie himself and leaving him and Terry to fight one-on-one. Devlin is eventually kicked from the roof by Terry and killed. Terry (who has a broken arm) and Anna visit Jake at the hospital, who is going to be okay and has forgiven Terry.

== Cast ==
- Thomas Ian Griffith as Detective Terry McCain
- Lance Henriksen as Captain Raymond Devlin
- James Earl Jones as Jake
- Charlotte Lewis as Anna Gilmour
- Tony Todd as Detective Frankie Hawkins
- Burt Young as Sal DiMarco
- Tom Hodges as Detective Dylan
- Danny Goldring as Lieutenant Landry
- Richard Mawe as Sergeant Sam Atwell
- Christopher Garbrecht as "Red"
- Ian Gomez as Lucas
- Sam Sanders as Dexter
- W. Earl Brown as Vinnie DiMarco
- Antoni Corone as Tommy "Fat Tommy"
- Tom Milanovich as Mario
- Randy Popplewell as Tony
- Paula Anglin as Yvonne
- Susan Wood as Lisa
- Brian Leahy as Irish Gang Leader
- Carl Ciarfalio as Guard #1

== Reception ==
=== Box office ===
Excessive Force grossed only $1,152,117 at the box office and became a flop. The film opened on May 14, 1993, at 501 theaters, grossing only $308,499 on its opening weekend.

=== Critical response ===
Excessive Force was panned by critics. On Rotten Tomatoes, the film has an approval rating of 20% based on reviews from 5 critics.

TV Guide gave the film only one star out of four and stated:

"At some point, Excessive Force, which lives up to its title, might have been envisioned as a taut, mysterious, high-action cop thriller. The end result, however, showcases relentless violence over plot—bludgeoning viewers with machine gun fire, bomb blasts, and endless kick-boxing battles.

Joe Leydon of Variety wrote:

"Even though New Line is going through the motions with a spotty, regional theatrical release, Excessive Force appears headed down the express lane to homevid, where it may find favor with undiscriminating action fans."

Rich Rosell from digitallyObsessed! gave it a very negative review, stating: "All of the dull fistfights and fiery explosions can do little to make this anything more than it is, which is something we've all seen before, and not necessarily something we would want to see again." Christopher Armstead from Film Critics United gave the film mixed review:

"Excessive Force is not a good movie and Thomas Ian Griffith did not become a big action star. That makes us sad, even though he's had a nice career. Charlotte Lewis topless and Lance and Tony overacting makes us happier. And this why Excessive Force is in my personal collection."

Nick Michalak writing at Forever Cinematic praised some aspects of Excessive Force, concluding:

"Excessive Force is not a great action movie, but it's a really good effort that I did like. The script is well written, and very well directed by Jon Hess, but it's really the exceptional acting talents of its admirable cast that allows this movie to be as good as it is. If filled with lesser grade talents, this would really falter, but putting guys like Griffith, Henriksen, Todd, Jones, and more into it gives it some extra substance."
