= Senior producer =

Person who oversees media production

Senior producer, also known as supervising producer, is a title given usually to the second most senior person of a computer game, animation, film or television production. Used mainly in the United Kingdom, a senior producer (who would occasionally replace a series producer for television drama or 'soap') would be the most senior member of production personnel underneath an executive producer.

A senior producer oversees a particular production paying particular detail to budget, staffing and talent including casting, scripting and the legal and logistic affairs of the production(s).
