= For the Cause (film) =

2000 American science-fiction fantasy film by David Douglas

- A DVD cover with the film's alternative title: Final Encounter
- Directed by: David Douglas; Tim Douglas
- Written by: David Douglas; Christopher Salazar
- Produced by: Boaz Davidson; Kia Jam; Danny Lerner
- Starring: Dean Cain; Thomas Ian Griffith
- Cinematography: Adolfo Bartoli
- Edited by: Irit Raz
- Music by: Kevin Memley
- Production company: Dimension Films
- Release date: November 16, 2000
- Running time: 100 minutes
- Country: United States
- Language: English
- Budget: $2.5 million

For the Cause (also known as Final Encounter) is a 2000 American direct-to-video science fantasy film directed by David Douglas and Tim Douglas, and starring Dean Cain and Thomas Ian Griffith.

== Plot ==
For the Cause is set in the late 26th century on a distant planet that has two human colonies. These colonies were founded as a refuge from the wars of Earth, but the vision died when the colonies began fighting a hundred-year war, reducing their once mighty cities to rubble. The stone walled city of Brecca is the northern neighbor of the nation of Obsidian, a culture of black glass cities and unfathomable technology. The war drags on with the vestiges of once mighty technologies, and the great armies are now but orphaned teenagers, fighting and dying for a cause they never knew. Unless the war ends, yet another entire generation of children on both sides will perish in battle.

Brecca’s greatest military leader, General Murren (Dean Cain), decides to use the last of Brecca’s ancient weapons to end the war. It is called Warhammer, a hundred-year-old nuclear weapon built to cripple Obsidian’s technology. Murren leads a small team to deliver the weapon to Obsidian, taking with him his most loyal soldier, Sutherland (Justin Whalin) and Abel (Jodi Bianca Wise), a beautiful woman who is the master of a dying art of computer warfare. Feared by even her own people, Abel uses her ancient skills to channel energy into lethal forms. Murren also selects Evans (Thomas Ian Griffith), a celebrated warrior with a mysterious past, who has learned that peace is greater than victory. The small team intends to penetrate the defenses of an enemy city that couldn't be reached by Murren's father and six million men, but as the team battles its way toward Obsidian, they also must contend with their own Breccan people, torn apart by a century of conflict.

== Cast ==
- Dean Cain as General Murren
- Justin Whalin as Sutherland
- Jodi Bianca Wise as Abel
- Thomas Ian Griffith as Evans
- Trae Thomas as Stoner
- Michelle Krusiec as Layton
- Stephen Ramsey as Varden
- Violeta Markovska as Deanna
- Maria Kancheva as Chapman
- Yuri Safchev as Rifkin
- Martin Karaivanov as Kevik
- Zlatomir Dimitrov as Anders
- Ivan Dimitrov as Reese
- Shelly Varod as Nara

Cain and Whalin had previously starred together in the TV series Lois & Clark: The New Adventures of Superman.

== Production ==
The film was shot in Bulgaria on a small budget of $2.5 million. Director David Douglas and his brother Tim were able to make the film with these limited resources by using new generation PC technology that reduced the cost of digital filmmaking. Inspired by Star Wars, the brothers became interested in videos and films, and formed a computer graphics company that did commercial work for the Fresno TV station. Later in Los Angeles, they became successful as CG artists. David got carpal tunnel syndrome and had to make a career change, so he decided to make "For the Cause". They soon signed with Miramax, but had trouble getting the project greenlighted. They eventually did a much smaller deal with Nu Image/Millennium, a low-budget film company. David feels that Bulgaria, with its pollution and bleak cities, was a perfect setting for the film, noting: "If you want to go to a place that looks like a futuristic world that failed, Bulgaria is it". Their only other feature film, Submarines (2003), was released straight to video.

== Reception ==
Clark Douglas of DVD Verdict called the film "a genuinely wretched affair" and "agonizingly long".
