= King of the Ring (1994) =

World Wrestling Federation pay-per-view event

- Promotional poster
- Promotion: World Wrestling Federation
- Date: June 19, 1994
- City: Baltimore, Maryland
- Venue: Baltimore Arena
- Attendance: 12,000
- Buy rate: 185,000
- Tagline: The Perfect Father's Day Card

Pay-per-view chronology
← Previous; WrestleMania X	Next → SummerSlam

King of the Ring event chronology
← Previous; 1993	Next → 1995

King of the Ring tournament chronology
← Previous; 1993	Next → 1995

The 1994 King of the Ring was a professional wrestling pay-per-view (PPV) event produced by the World Wrestling Federation (WWF, renamed WWE in 2002). It was the second annual King of the Ring event and hosted the finals of the eighth King of the Ring tournament for men. It took place on June 19, 1994, at the Baltimore Arena in Baltimore, Maryland.

The tournament to determine which wrestler would be crowned the 1994 "King of the Ring" actually began the month before the pay-per-view, as the wrestlers gained entry in the tournament by participating in qualifying matches. These matches were held throughout May 1994 on WWF television programs, although the WWF did not explain how wrestlers were selected to compete in the qualifying matches. The second, third, and fourth rounds of the tournament were televised on the pay-per-view broadcast. In the final, Owen Hart defeated Razor Ramon to become the "King of the Ring", after defeating Tatanka and the 1–2–3 Kid earlier in the show. He used his coronation ceremony to criticize his brother Bret Hart, with whom he was feuding. The Hart brothers' feud led to a Steel Cage match for Bret's WWF Championship. Although Owen lost the title match, the feud carried on as more family members got involved.

In addition to the tournament, several other matches were held at the event. In a grudge match between two semi-retired wrestlers, "Rowdy" Roddy Piper defeated Jerry Lawler. Bret Hart defended his WWF Championship against Diesel, who won the match by disqualification when Hart's brother-in-law Jim Neidhart interfered. As a result, Hart retained the title as titles do not change hands by disqualification unless stipulated. The other match was for the WWF Tag Team Championship, in which The Headshrinkers (Samu and Fatu) successfully defended the title against the team of Yokozuna and Crush.

The event is remembered among fans for featuring former National Football League player Art Donovan on commentary. Donovan seemingly had no familiarity with professional wrestling, and repeatedly asked the same questions throughout the event, notably, "How much does this guy weigh?". Retrospectively, the event received mixed reviews, with praise towards the WWF Championship match and the victory of Owen Hart, while the main event and Donovan's commentary were critically panned, with some calling Donovan's commentary the worst in WWF history.

== Production ==
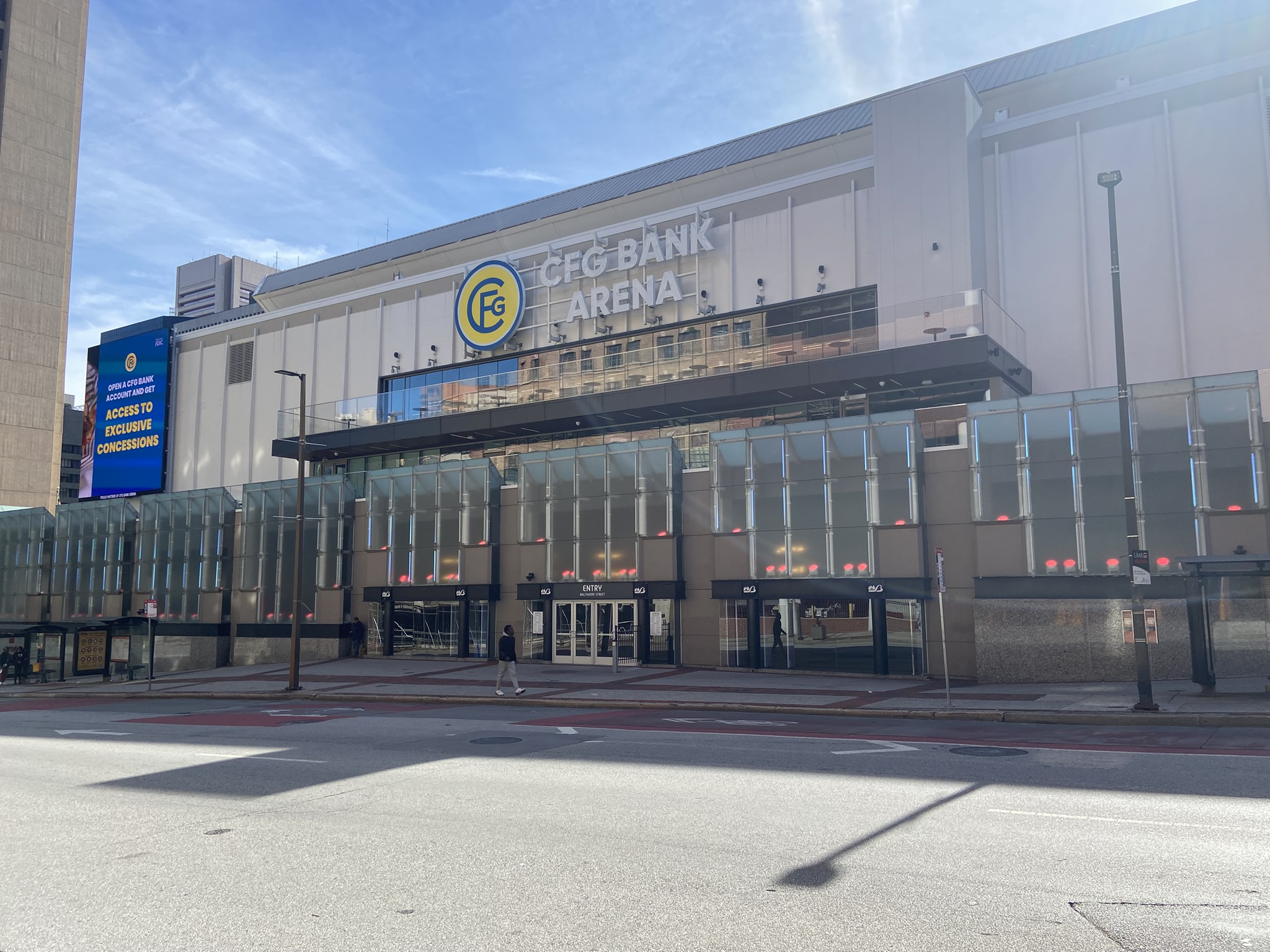
The second annual King of the Ring event was held in Baltimore, Maryland at the Baltimore Arena (pictured in 2025 after it had since been renamed as CFG Bank Arena).

=== Background ===
The King of the Ring tournament is a men's single-elimination tournament that was established by the World Wrestling Federation (WWF, renamed WWE in 2002) in 1985 with the winner of the tournament being crowned "King of the Ring". It was held annually until 1991, with the exception of 1990. These early tournaments were held as special non-televised house shows in an effort to boost attendance at these events. In 1993, the WWF began to produce the King of the Ring tournament as a self-titled pay-per-view (PPV) event. Unlike the previous non-televised events, the PPV did not feature all of the tournament's matches. Instead, several of the qualifying matches preceded the event with the final few matches then taking place at the PPV. There were also other matches that took place at the event as it was a traditional three-hour PPV.

A second King of the Ring event was scheduled for June 19, 1994, at the Baltimore Arena in Baltimore, Maryland and hosted the finals of the eighth tournament. This established King of the Ring as the annual June PPV for the promotion, with the event being considered one of the WWF's "Big Five" PPVs, along with the Royal Rumble, WrestleMania, SummerSlam, and Survivor Series, the company's five biggest shows of the year.

=== Storylines ===
Participants in the tournament qualified in matches televised during WWF programs in the weeks prior to the event. The first qualifying match took place on May 7, 1994. Irwin R. Schyster (I.R.S.) defeated Scott Steiner in a match televised on Superstars of Wrestling. The next qualifying match took place on the May 9, 1994 episode of Monday Night Raw, when Razor Ramon defeated Kwang with a Razor's Edge in a qualifying match to enter the tournament. In a match televised on May 14, 1994, Mabel (of Men on a Mission) defeated Pierre (of The Quebecers) to qualify for the tournament. Two days later, the May 16, 1994 edition of Monday Night RAW, Bam Bam Bigelow qualified for the tournament by defeating Thurman "Sparky" Plugg.

The remaining qualifying matches built up to the tournament and developed storylines that played out on the pay-per-view. Lex Luger faced Jeff Jarrett in a qualifying match on May 21, 1994. During the match, Crush came to the ring and fought with Luger. Jarrett won the match by countout and advanced to the tournament. Owen Hart was scheduled to wrestle Earthquake on May 23, 1994, for a spot in the tournament, but the plan was changed after Earthquake left the WWF. To explain Earthquake's absence, the WWF showed footage of Yokozuna wrestling Earthquake and claimed that Earthquake had sustained an injury. Doink the Clown took Earthquake's place, but Owen Hart won the match to qualify for the tournament. Next, on May 28, 1994, a qualifying match between the 1–2–3 Kid and Adam Bomb was televised on WWF Superstars. The Kid won after Kwang attempted to interfere on Bomb's behalf. Kwang accidentally spat green mist in Bomb's face, allowing the Kid to get the victory. In the final qualifying match, Jimmy Del Ray was originally scheduled to face Tatanka in a match televised on Monday Night Raw on May 30, 1994, but Crush took Del Ray's place. The kayfabe reason given was that Crush's manager, Mr. Fuji, made a deal with Jim Cornette, Del Ray's manager, to allow Crush to compete. The match ended in a double countout, after Fuji and Chief Jay Strongbow, who was seconding Tatanka, got involved. This led to a Lumberjack match on Monday Night Raw the following week. Tatanka won the match and the spot in the tournament, after Lex Luger gained revenge for Crush's interference in his match by attacking Crush.

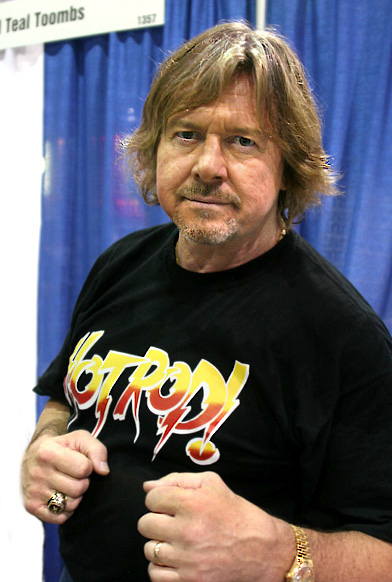
"Rowdy" Roddy Piper faced Jerry Lawler at King of the Ring 1994.

The Headshrinkers had recently become faces after signing Captain Lou Albano as their manager. They received an immediate push and won the WWF Tag Team Championship by defeating The Quebecers on the May 2, 1994 edition of Monday Night Raw. Meanwhile, Yokozuna was being buried by the WWF after losing the WWF Championship at WrestleMania X and being defeated by Earthquake in a Sumo match. He teamed with Crush, who was also managed by Mr. Fuji, to challenge The Headshrinkers for the tag team title at King of the Ring.

After beating Razor Ramon for the WWF Intercontinental Championship in April 1994, Diesel was in the midst of a major push. He was considered the top contender to Bret Hart's WWF Championship, and a match was booked for King of the Ring in which only Hart's title would be on the line. The feud intensified on the May 30, 1994, episode of Monday Night Raw during Jerry Lawler's interview segment, The King's Court. During an interview with Hart, Lawler invited Diesel and his friend Shawn Michaels to confront Hart. After a verbal confrontation, Diesel performed his Jacknife Powerbomb on Hart, after which Diesel, Michaels and Lawler attacked Hart. The following week on Monday Night Raw, Bret announced that he would have a family member, whose identity would be a secret until the pay-per-view, in his corner to help prevent Michaels from interfering on Diesel's behalf.

The buildup to the main event match began at WrestleMania X. "Rowdy" Roddy Piper had served as the guest referee during the main event match between Bret Hart and Yokozuna, and Jerry Lawler was a commentator. Following WrestleMania, Lawler used his interview segment, The King's Court, to insult Piper. After a match was signed between the two, Lawler insulted Piper further by introducing a scrawny fan dressed as Piper on The King's Court. He claimed that this impersonator was Piper himself, and he made the fan kiss Lawler's feet.

== Event ==
Other on-screen personnel
Role:	Name:
English commentators	Gorilla Monsoon
English commentators	Randy Savage
English commentators	Art Donovan
Spanish commentators	Carlos Cabrera
Spanish commentators	Hugo Savinovich
Interviewer	Todd Pettengill
Interviewer	Ray Rougeau
Ring Announcer	Bill Dunn
Referee	Mike Chioda
Referee	Danny Davis
Referee	Earl Hebner
Referee	Joey Marella

King of the Ring 1994 was held at the Baltimore Arena in Baltimore on June 19, 1994. Before the pay-per-view broadcast began, Thurman "Sparky" Plugg beat Kwang in a dark match. As the event began, it was revealed that retired football player Art Donovan would be one of the commentators for the evening. Donovan's appearance would become infamous among wrestling fans for being seemingly uninformed about the product as well as generally befuddled behavior such as repeatedly asking how much certain wrestlers weighed. He was joined by Gorilla Monsoon on play-by-play, who inadvertently referred to Donovan as "Art O'Donnell", and Randy Savage. Monsoon, who had not called a pay-per-view since 1993's Royal Rumble after being phased out in favor of Jim Ross, and later Vince McMahon, served as McMahon's replacement due to McMahon's preparation for his upcoming trial for steroid distribution. To cover up his absence, it was announced that McMahon could not appear because he was recovering from neck surgery.

In the first match of the tournament, Bam Bam Bigelow got the early advantage by attacking Razor Ramon from behind. Ramon gained momentum after Bigelow missed a diving headbutt, but Bigelow used his strength and got Ramon in a torture rack. As Bigelow climbed the ropes, however, Ramon threw him back into the ring and scored the pinfall.

The following match saw Irwin R. Schyster face Mabel. When Schyster charged at Mabel before the bell, Mabel used his strength to block Schyster and to then powerslam him. Schyster was not able to use much offense due to the size of his opponent. He scored the win, however, when he shook the ropes as Mabel was about to attempt a maneuver from the top rope. Mabel fell to the mat, allowing I.R.S. to pin him.

At the beginning of the next match, Tatanka attacked Owen Hart before the bell. The match soon moved into the ringside area, where Hart gained the advantage. After a sleeper hold by Hart and a DDT by Tatanka, Hart reversed Tatanka's sunset flip attempt and pinned him to advance to the next round.

Jarrett used his strength against the 1–2–3 Kid in the following match. The Kid fought back with a spinning heel kick, but Jarrett regained control. Toward the end of the match, The Kid sustained a kayfabe injury to his knee. Jarrett tried to use this to his advantage by using the Figure Four leglock, but The Kid blocked the hold by using a small package to pin Jarrett for the victory. Upset at being eliminated from the tournament, Jarrett responded by performing three piledrivers on The Kid after the match.

The WWF Championship match between Bret Hart and Diesel came next. Diesel was accompanied by Shawn Michaels, and Hart was joined by brother-in-law and former tag-team partner Jim Neidhart. Diesel used his size against Hart, but Hart managed to perform a Figure Four leglock on Diesel. After this was broken, the wrestlers fought outside the ring. Michaels got involved and attacked Hart. Back inside the ring, Hart and Diesel fought as Michaels removed the turnbuckle pad. Hart reversed Diesel's attack, however, and slammed Diesel's head into the turnbuckle. Hart put Diesel in the Sharpshooter, but Diesel easily reached the ropes to break the hold. Michaels attacked Hart while the referee's back was turned, which allowed Diesel to perform the Jackknife powerbomb. Before he could pin Hart, however, Neidhart interfered to cause the disqualification and allow Hart to retain his title. After the match, Diesel and Michaels attacked Hart, but Neidhart left the ring.

Following the WWF Championship match, the second round of the tournament began. Razor Ramon attacked his opponent, I.R.S., in the aisle before the match. The two brawled outside the ring. Afterward, while using the ropes for leverage, I.R.S. gained the advantage inside the ring by applying a chinlock. Ramon escaped the hold, kicked Schyster, and performed the Razor's Edge for the win.

In the other semifinal match, Owen Hart attacked the 1–2–3 Kid before the bell. Hart used his momentum to wear The Kid down with aerial maneuvers. Although The Kid briefly gained the advantage, Hart performed a powerbomb on him and then used the Sharpshooter to make The Kid submit.

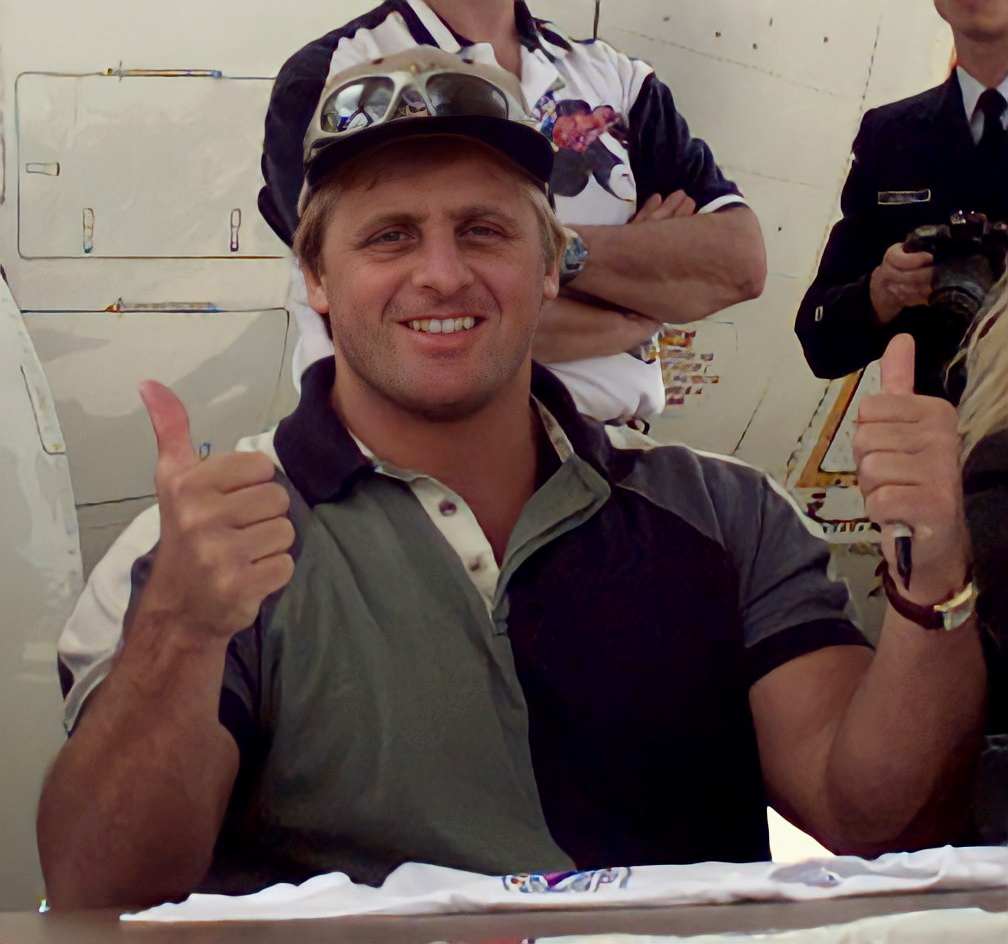
Owen Hart won the King of the Ring tournament.

The next match was the WWF Tag Team Championship match. The Headshrinkers gained the early advantage, but Mr. Fuji helped his team by hitting Fatu with the Japanese flag. Yokozuna performed a leg drop on Fatu, but Samu was able to tag in. All four wrestlers fought in the ring before the brawl moved to the arena floor. Crush performed a superplex on Samu, but Lex Luger came to ringside and distracted Crush. This allowed Samu to attempt a roll-up. Crush recovered, but Fatu tagged in and pinned Crush to retain the belts.

Razor Ramon began the final match of the tournament by bodyslamming Owen Hart. Hart used a spinning heel kick and an abdominal stretch to gain the advantage. Ramon performed a back suplex on Hart from the top rope and attempted to use the Razor's Edge. Hart threw him onto the arena floor, however, where Neidhart attacked Ramon. Hart pinned Ramon and proclaimed himself the "King of Harts" during his coronation ceremony.

Before the main event match, Piper revealed that the fan humiliated by Lawler in the King's Court segment would be in Piper's corner during the match. Piper started the match by throwing his kilt in Lawler's face and attacking him. The match consisted mainly of brawling, and Lawler was frequently distracted by the fan who was standing in Piper's corner. Lawler gained the advantage by performing a sleeper hold and a piledriver on Piper. He attacked Piper with a foreign object, which knocked Piper to the mat. Then, while trying to pin Piper, Jerry Lawler placed his feet on the ropes for leverage. The fan at ringside pushed Lawler's feet off, however, which allowed Piper to perform a back suplex and get the victory.

== Reception ==
Retrospective reviews of the event have been generally mixed. Positive reviews were directed specifically at the WWF Championship match and Owen Hart's win of the King of the Ring Tournament, whilst the bout between Jerry Lawler and Roddy Piper, along with Art Donovan's commentary were generally panned.

Writing for TJRWrestling, John Canton rated the show at a 6 out of 10, noting how much he enjoyed the Hart/Diesel bout and how well the event elevated Owen Hart, but stated that putting Lawler and Piper on last as the main event was a mistake as it was "a boring match", noting how it was "funny how they threw the “New Generation” phrase out there all night, yet two guys in their 40s main evented the show". He also panned Donovan's commentary, feeling that Monsoon and Savage were frustrated by his lack of knowledge and that "One match would have been okay, but by the end of the night it was too much."

Writing for 411Mania, Dylan Dilot was far more negative, giving the show a 5 out of 10 and stating "Thank god for Bret Hart and Diesel otherwise this would go down as an all-time bad WWF show". He heavily panned Donovan's commentary, calling it "the worst commentary in company history" and describing the overall King of the Ring tournament as "bland", and declared the Lawler/Piper bout as "one of the worst main events the WWF ever put on".

== Aftermath ==
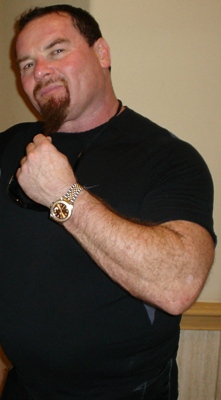
Jim Neidhart interfered at King of the Ring and was a major part of the Hart brothers' feud.

Owen Hart's victory intensified his feud with his brother Bret. Having defeated him at WrestleMania X and replicated Bret's victory in the 1993 King of the Ring tournament, Owen set his sights on Bret's WWF Championship. The two met at SummerSlam in a Steel Cage match for the title. Jim Neidhart was in the audience to support Owen. Davey Boy Smith, another brother-in-law of the Hart brothers, got involved with the feud by siding with Bret after Neidhart attacked Smith after the cage match.

Because the pay-per-view focused on the tournament, few major feuds were highlighted. Aside from Owen Hart, the tournament did not figure prominently into the future storylines of any of the other participants. The qualifying match between the 1–2–3 Kid and Adam Bomb did, however, help advance a storyline. Bomb and Kwang, both managed by Harvey Wippleman, began feuding shortly after King of the Ring when Wippleman and Kwang turned on Bomb. Bomb began wrestling as a face as a result. Their feud did not end with a major blow off match, however. Instead, it was quietly resolved in a dark match prior to the SummerSlam 1994 broadcast.

"Rowdy" Roddy Piper did not reappear on WWF programming again until 1995, and Lawler returned to doing commentary as well as feuding with Bret Hart.

Despite failing to capture the WWF Championship at King of the Ring, Diesel continued to enjoy an unprecedented push. In 1994, he became the first wrestler in WWF history to win the WWF's Triple Crown in one calendar year. The Headshrinkers dropped the WWF Tag Team Championship to Diesel and Michaels one day before SummerSlam. Diesel followed this up by winning the WWF Championship on November 26, 1994.

== Home media and streaming ==
The event was released on VHS by Coliseum Video in the United States and by Silver Vision in the United Kingdom. The British tape also included the pre-show Countdown event.

It was re-released on DVD in the United Kingdom in July 2004 as part of Silver Vision's Tagged Classics range, and was paired with King of the Ring 1993. This DVD set was not released in the USA.

In 2014, the event was included on the WWE's streaming platform the WWE Network as part of its launch and remained on the service until the platform closed in 2026. As of September 2026, subscribers in multiple territories, including the US, Canada and the UK, can stream the event on Netflix, thanks to the WWE's ten-year agreement with the company.

== Results ==
No.	Results	Stipulations	Times
1^{D}	Thurman Plugg defeated Kwang (with Harvey Wippleman)	Singles match	—
2	Razor Ramon defeated Bam Bam Bigelow (with Luna Vachon)	King of the Ring quarter-final match	8:24
3	Irwin R. Schyster defeated Mabel (with Oscar)	King of the Ring quarter-final match	5:34
4	Owen Hart defeated Tatanka	King of the Ring quarter-final match	8:18
5	The 1–2–3 Kid defeated Jeff Jarrett	King of the Ring quarter-final match	4:39
6	Diesel (with Shawn Michaels) defeated Bret Hart (c) (with Jim Neidhart) by disqualification	Singles match for the WWF Championship	22:51
7	Razor Ramon defeated Irwin R. Schyster	King of the Ring semi-final match	5:13
8	Owen Hart defeated The 1–2–3 Kid	King of the Ring semi-final match	3:37
9	The Headshrinkers (Samu and Fatu) (c) (with Afa and Lou Albano) defeated Yokozuna and Crush (with Mr. Fuji and Jim Cornette)	Tag team match for the WWF Tag Team Championship	9:16
10	Owen Hart defeated Razor Ramon	King of the Ring final match	6:35
11	Roddy Piper defeated Jerry Lawler	Singles match	12:30
(c) / – the champion(s) heading into the match; D / – this was a dark match

=== Tournament brackets ===
The tournament took place between May 7 and June 19, 1994. The tournament brackets were:

First Round (TV)
Kwang	09:42
Razor Ramon	Pin
Bam Bam Bigelow	Pin
Thurman Plugg	06:28
Irwin R. Schyster	Pin
Scott Steiner	06:51
Mabel	Pin
Pierre Ouellet	02:57
Doink the Clown	10:43
Owen Hart	Pin
Crush	17:08
Tatanka^{1}	Pin
The 1–2–3 Kid	Pin
Adam Bomb	05:13
Jeff Jarrett	CO
Lex Luger	06:52

Quarterfinals (PPV)
Razor Ramon	Pin
Bam Bam Bigelow	08:24
Irwin R. Schyster	Pin
Mabel	05:34
Owen Hart	Pin
Tatanka	08:18
The 1–2–3 Kid	Pin
Jeff Jarrett	04:39

Semifinals (PPV)
Razor Ramon	Pin
Irwin R. Schyster	05:13
Owen Hart	Sub
The 1–2–3 Kid	03:37

Final (PPV)
Razor Ramon	06:35
Owen Hart	Pin

In a May 30, 1994, King of the Ring Qualifying match, Crush (replacing the originally announced Jimmy Del Ray) and Tatanka wrestled to a Double Count-Out on Monday Night Raw. The two wrestled again the next week on Raw in a Lumberjack match for the final slot in the King of the Ring.
