= Jennie Garth =

American actress (born 1972)

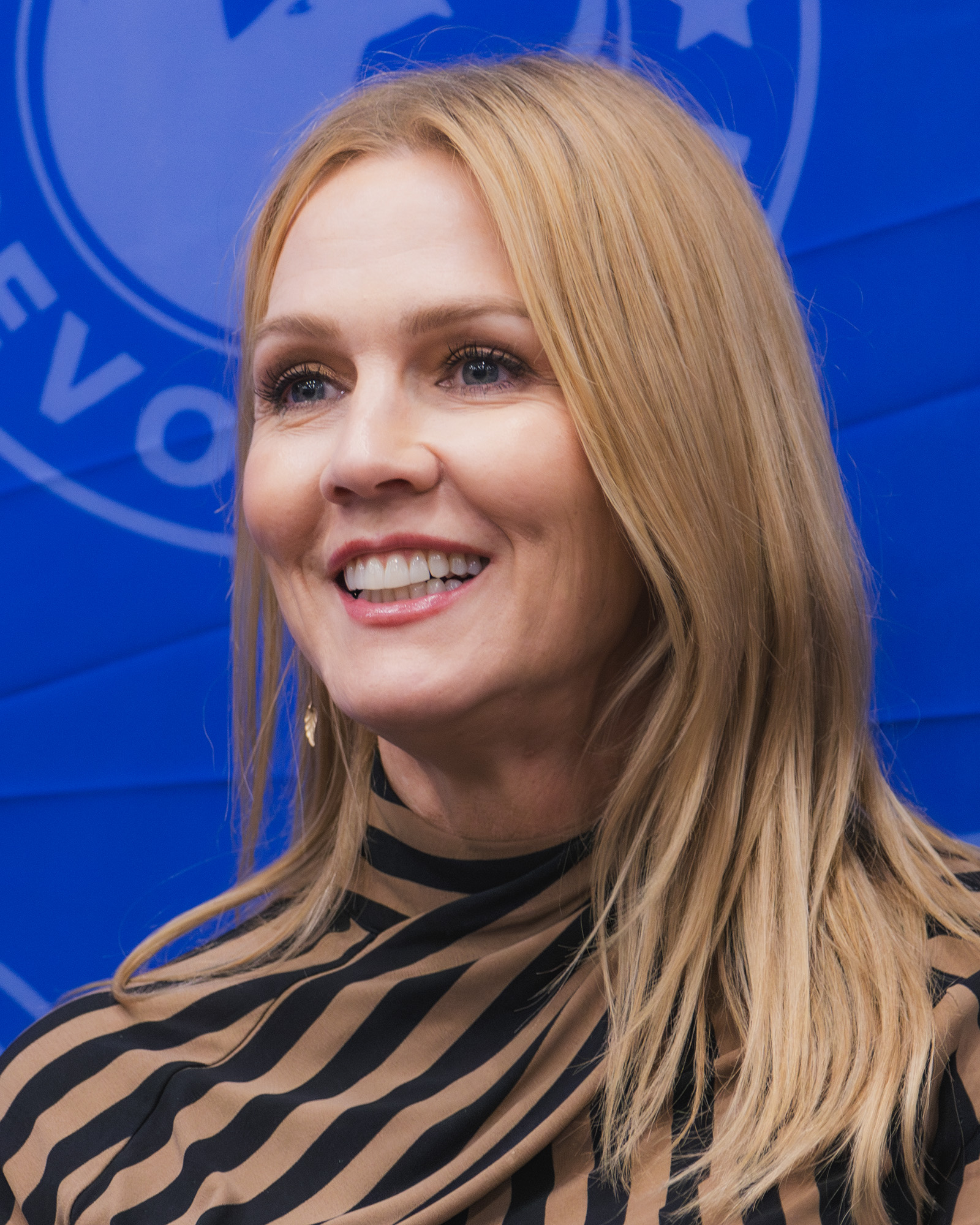
- Garth in 2026
- Born: Jennifer Eve Garth; April 3, 1972 (age 54); Urbana, Illinois, U.S.
- Occupations: Actress, fashion designer
- Years active: 1989–present
- Spouses: Daniel B. Clark (m. 1994; div. 1996) Peter Facinelli (m. 2001; div. 2013) Dave Abrams (m. 2015)
- Children: 3

Jennifer Eve Garth (born April 3, 1972) is an American actress. She is known for starring as Kelly Taylor throughout the Beverly Hills, 90210 franchise and Val Tyler on the sitcom What I Like About You (2002–2006). In 2012, she starred in her own reality show, Jennie Garth: A Little Bit Country on CMT. Her memoir titled Deep Thoughts From a Hollywood Blonde was published by New American Library on April 1, 2014.

== Early life ==
Garth was born in Urbana, Illinois, to John and Carolyn Garth. The youngest of seven children (though their only child together), Garth spent much of her youth on a 25-acre horse ranch between Sadorus and Arcola, Illinois. For a time, the family stayed in Tuscola, Illinois; but eventually, they settled in Glendale, Arizona, when Garth was around 13 years old. She studied dance and modeled, and was soon discovered at a local talent competition by Randy James, a Hollywood scout and manager. She attended Greenway High School as a freshman and transferred to Apollo High School in her sophomore year. Determined to become an actress, Garth would receive audition materials from Los Angeles that she would work on with Jean Fowler, a local acting coach. She left school during her junior year to work in Los Angeles with James and later obtained her high school diploma in California.

== Career ==
=== 1989–2001: Career beginnings and Beverly Hills, 90210 ===
In 1990, she landed the role of Kelly Taylor in the series Beverly Hills, 90210. Throughout the series, Garth's character went through occasional rough times and dealt with difficult issues in her personal life and with her family. Garth appears in all ten seasons of the show. She directed two episodes which was the second most of any cast member, and was the only female cast member of the show to direct. She won a Young Artist Award and was nominated for a Teen Choice Award for the role. She was also instrumental in launching the spin-offs Melrose Place and 90210, with the character of Kelly becoming a continuity icon by appearing in most franchise episodes. In 1993, she released a workout video titled Body In Progress.

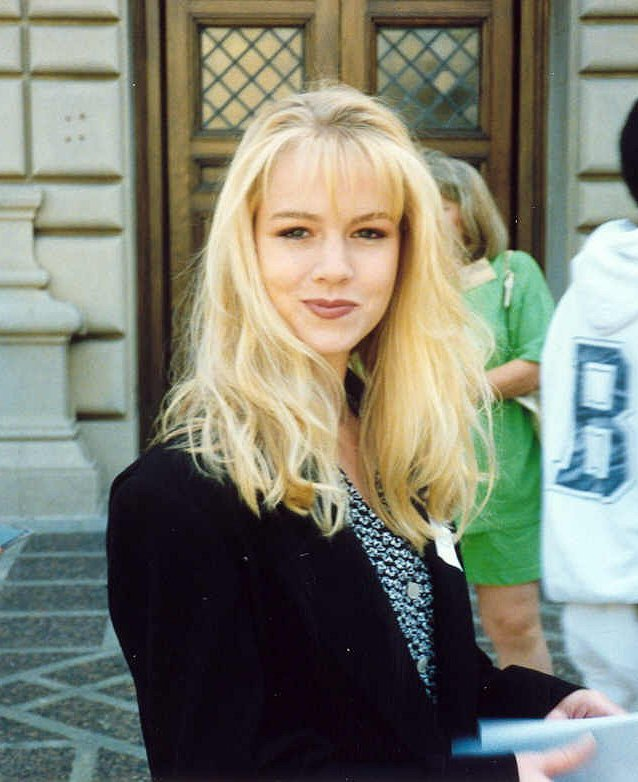
Garth at a rehearsal for the 44th Primetime Emmy Awards in 1992

Her successful role on Beverly Hills, 90210 opened the door to several lead roles in made-for-TV films in the 1990s, including Danielle Steel's Star (1993), Without Consent (1994), Lies of the Heart: The Story of Laurie Kellogg (1994), Falling for You (1995), and An Unfinished Affair (1996). She also had minor and supporting roles in the theatrical films Telling You (1998), My Brother's War (1997), and Power 98 (1996). Garth also appeared at the WWF's WrestleMania X pay-per-view in 1994 as the guest timekeeper for the show's main event.

Garth ranked No. 59 on the FHM 100 Sexiest Women of 2000, and #93 on the magazine's 100 Sexiest Women of 2001.

=== 2002–2013: Continued television success with What I Like About You ===
In 2002, Garth co-starred with Amanda Bynes in the WB sitcom What I Like About You as Valerie Tyler. She and Bynes appeared on the show for all four seasons. The show centered around the Tyler sisters' relationships, friendships, and romances. In 2003, she starred in the television movies The Last Cowboy and the Christmas family drama Secret Santa, playing a journalist. She and the cast of Secret Santa won the 2004 CAMIE Award. In 2004, she appeared in a print ad for Wish-Bone salad dressings as part of their $25,000 Kitchen Makeover contest.

In 2005, she voiced her Beverly Hills, 90210 character Kelly Taylor, as well as an additional role in the Family Guy Presents Stewie Griffin: The Untold Story, in the episode segment “Bango Was His Name-Oh!”. Garth also starred in the TV teen drama film Girl, Positive (2007), playing a teacher who was HIV positive. She and co-star Andrea Bowen (known for the series Desperate Housewives) each won a Prism Award for their performances. In 2007, Garth appeared on Dancing with the Stars: season five and was paired with Derek Hough. They reached the semi-finals of the competition.

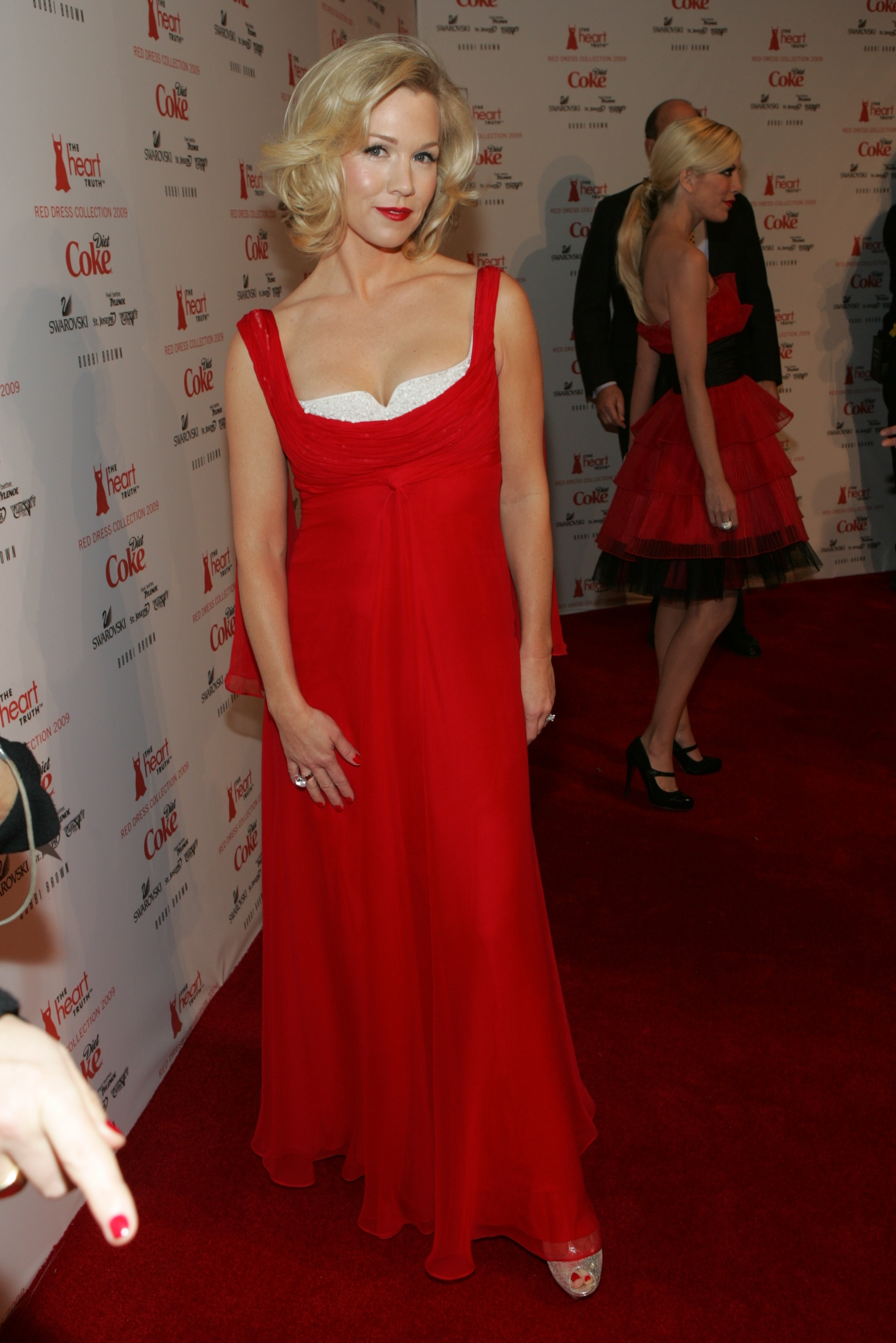
Garth at The Heart Truth's Red Dress Collection Fashion Show during New York Fashion Week on February 13, 2009

In September 2008, Garth returned to the role of Kelly Taylor on the series premiere of The CW's spin-off series 90210. In the series, Garth's character, Kelly Taylor, is a Guidance Counselor at the fictional West Beverly High, where her half-sister Erin Silver attends. Kelly was reintroduced with a four-year-old son, whose father is ex-boyfriend Dylan McKay. The writers were eager to have her share scenes with former Beverly Hills, 90210 co-star Shannen Doherty, who reprised her role of Brenda Walsh.

On November 21, 2008, Garth appeared on the game show Are You Smarter than a 5th Grader?. She won $100,000 for her charity, the American Heart Association, for which she is a spokeswoman for its "Go Red for Women" campaign. This TV show also noted that Garth owns a horse ranch in Santa Barbara, California. In 2009, she played the role of Natasha in Candace Bushnell's Web series of The Boardroom. She also appeared in a cameo role on the December 7 episode of the children's television show Sesame Street, entitled "Mary Mary Quite Contrary". In January 2010, Garth starred in an iVillage web series created by NBC Universal, Garden Party, about farm life, fresh produce, and healthy eating.

=== 2014–present: Memoir and her own reality television show ===
On February 18, 2014, it was announced that production had started on The Jennie Garth Project, a ten-episode reality television series that aired on HGTV. It chronicled Garth as she renovated a home in Hollywood Hills, California for herself and her three children.

Garth released a memoir entitled Deep Thoughts from a Hollywood Blonde with Emily Heckman on April 1, 2014. On May 3, 2017, Garth launched MomGiftBox.com, "an online subscription box of products to indulge, inspire and pamper moms with every purchase benefiting a charity." Garth collaborated with Dune Jewelry and launched Travelling Heart Collection in February 2018.

In 2019, Garth reunited with her original Beverly Hills, 90210 castmates Shannen Doherty, Jason Priestley, Ian Ziering, Gabrielle Carteris, Brian Austin Green, and Tori Spelling for BH90210, which was a six-episode series in which the cast played heightened, fictionalized versions of themselves. The series aired in August and September 2019 and was canceled after one season.

In November 2020, Garth began a podcast titled 9021OMG with Beverly Hills, 90210 co-star Tori Spelling, where the two, along with TV and radio personality Sisanie Villaclara, share memories from their time on the show. In February 2021, Garth won $168,000 on ABC's Celebrity Wheel of Fortune. Garth donated the money to Central Illinois Foodbank in Springfield, Illinois.

On July 29, 2024, Garth launched a clothing line, "Me by Jennie Garth", on QVC.

== Personal life ==
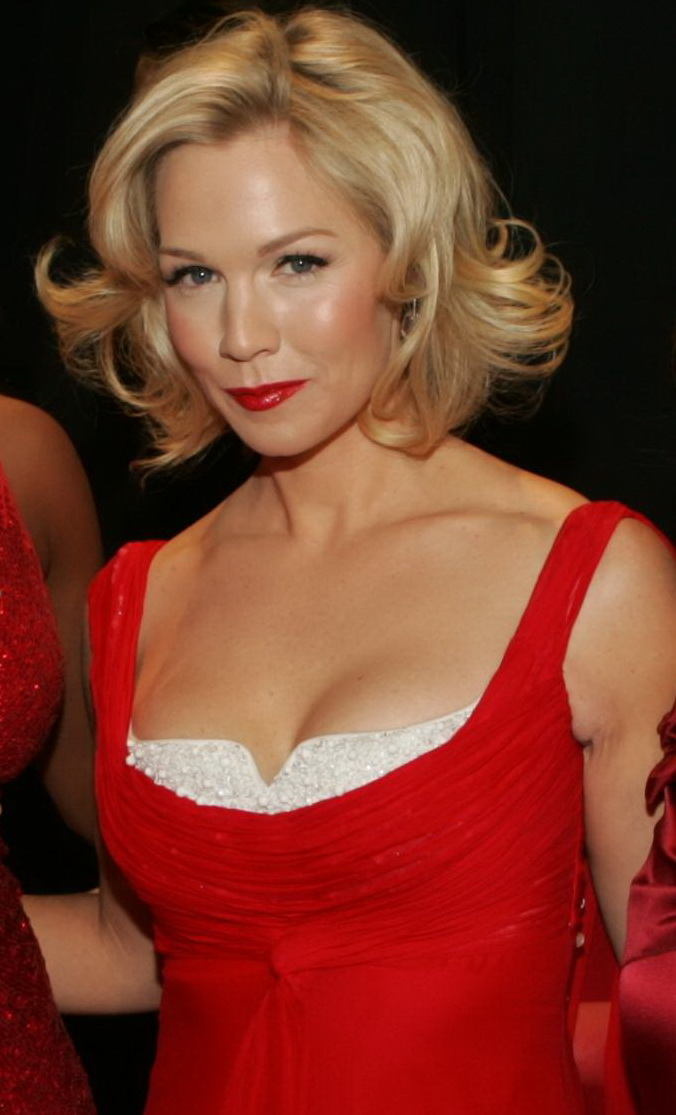
Garth backstage at the 2009 Heart Truth fashion show

Garth was married to musician Daniel B. Clark from 1994 to 1996.

In 1995, Garth met her second husband, actor Peter Facinelli, while filming the movie An Unfinished Affair. Garth and Facinelli married on January 20, 2001, in a traditional Catholic wedding Mass. They have three daughters, born in 1997, 2002, and 2006. In March 2012, Facinelli filed for divorce. The divorce was finalized in June 2013.

Garth began dating actor David Abrams in the fall of 2014, starting with a blind date. They got engaged in April 2015, and married on July 11, 2015. Garth and Abrams separated in 2017. In April 2018, the couple filed for divorce. In February 2019, they appeared to have reconciled, with Abrams filing a petition to dismiss the divorce proceedings.

In 2002, at age 30, Garth was diagnosed with a mitral valve prolapse and leaky heart valve, a condition she stated would require monitoring for the rest of her life. She revealed the diagnosis in 2009. "Down the road it’s something that could get more complicated or it could not," she commented. "People have had valve replacements and that kind of thing … but I’m prepared, that’s the key." She revealed in her memoir that she started suffering from anxiety at age 19, saying "I wouldn't say that I ever stepped over the line into full-blown agoraphobia, but I would say I definitely came close."

== Filmography ==
=== Television ===
Year	Title	Role	Notes
1989	Growing Pains	Denise	Episode: "Ben and Mike's Excellent Adventure"
1989–1990	Brand New Life	Ericka McCray	6 episodes
1990	Teen Angel Returns	Karrie Donato	
1990–2000	Beverly Hills, 90210	Kelly Taylor	Main role
1992	Melrose Place	Kelly Taylor	3 episodes
1993	Danielle Steel's Star	Crystal Wyatt	Television film
1994	Lies of the Heart: The Story of Laurie Kellogg	Laurie Kellogg	Television film
1994	Without Consent	Laura Mills	Television film
1995	Falling for You	Meg Crane	Television film
1995	The Larry Sanders Show	Herself	Episode: "Larry's Sitcom"
1995	Biker Mice from Mars	Angel Revson (voice)	Episode: "Hit the Road, Jack"
1996	An Unfinished Affair	Sheila Hart	Television film
1996	A Loss of Innocence	Chelnicia "Chel" Bowen	Television film
1999	FANatic	Herself	Episode: "Jennie Garth, Limp Bizkit"
2000–2001	The $treet	Gillian Sherman	8 episodes
2001	Watching the Detectives	Celeste	Television film
2002–2006	What I Like About You	Val Tyler	Main role
2003	The Last Cowboy	Jacqueline 'Jake' Cooper	Television film
2003	Secret Santa	Rebecca Chandler	Television film
2006	American Dad!	Trudy Lawrence (voice)	Episode: "Roger n' Me"
2007	Girl, Positive	Sarah Bennett	Television film
2007	Dancing with the Stars	Herself	23 episodes
2008–2010	90210	Kelly Taylor	Main role
2011	Accidentally in Love	Annie Benchley	Television film
2011	A Christmas Wedding Tail	Susan	Television film
2012	The Eleventh Victim	Hailey Dean	Television film
2012	Village People	Alexa	Television film
2012	Jennie Garth: A Little Bit Country	Herself	8 episodes
2013	Community	Ensign	Episode: "Conventions of Space and Time"
2013	Holidaze	Melody	Television film
2014	Mystery Girls	Charlie Contour	Main role
2014	The Jennie Garth Project	Herself	10 episodes
2016	Chopped Junior	Herself / Judge	Episode: "Summer Sizzle"
2016	A Time To Dance	Abby Reynolds	Television film
2016	Robot Chicken	Courtney, Carol Brady (voice)	Episode: "Secret of the Flushed Footlong"
2016	Cupcake Wars	Herself / Contestant	Episode: "Celebrity: Atari Cupcakes"
2017	RuPaul's Drag Race	Herself / Guest Judge	Episode: "9021-HO"
2017	Celebrity Family Feud	Herself	Episodes: "Jennie Garth vs. Kyle Massey & Lee Brice vs. Jerrod Niemann"
2018	The Mick	Herself	Episode: "The Climb"
2019	MasterChef	Herself / Contestant	Episode: "Celebrity Family Showdown: Part 2"
2019	Your Family or Your Life	Kathy Meyer	Television film
2019	BH90210	Herself / Kelly Taylor	Also co-producer
2020	2020 American Rescue Dog Show	Herself / Celebrity Judge	Special
2021	Left for Dead: The Ashley Reeves Story	Michelle Reeves	Television film
2021	Celebrity Wheel of Fortune	Herself / Celebrity Contestant	Episode: "Jennie Garth, Karamo Brown and Patton Oswalt"
2021	A Kindhearted Christmas	Jamie	Television film
2022	Bad Influence	Joan Miller	Television film
2023	Hell's Kitchen	Herself	Chef's table guest diner for the Red Team; Episode: "Gimme an H!"
2024	I Can See Your Voice	Herself / Panelist	Episode: "Queen Night: Gavin DeGraw, Thomas Lennon, Jennie Garth, Adrienne Bailon, Cheryl Hines"
2024	25 Words or Less	Herself / Contestant	6 episodes

=== Film ===
Year	Title	Role	Notes
1996	Power 98	Sharon Penn	
1997	My Brother's War	Mary Fagan Bailey	
1998	Telling You	Amber	Uncredited
2005	Stewie Griffin: The Untold Story	Kelly Taylor	Video; voice role

== Dancing with the Stars performances ==
In 2007, Garth appeared on season five of Dancing with the Stars and was paired with Derek Hough. They reached the semi-finals in the competition.

Week #	Dance / Song	Judges' score			Result
Week #	Dance / Song	Inaba	Goodman	Tonioli	Result
1	Cha-cha-cha / "Uptown Girl"	7	7	7	Safe
2	Quickstep / "Suddenly I See"	7	7	7	Safe
3	Tango / "Cite Tango"	9	8	9	Safe
4	Paso doble / "Because We Can"	8	10	9	Safe
5	Samba / "Cosmic Girl"	8	9	8	Safe
6	Mambo / "Mambo Baby"	9	9	9	Safe
6	Rock N' Roll / "Rockin' Robin"	No scores given			Safe
7	Viennese Waltz / "Runaway"	8	8	9	Last to be called safe
7	Rumba / "Fallen"	9	9	10	Last to be called safe
8	Jive / "It Takes Two"	8	8	8	Last to be called safe
8	Foxtrot / "I've Got You Under My Skin"	9	9	8	Last to be called safe
9 Semi-finals	Tango / "The Take Over, The Breaks Over"	9	10	9	Eliminated
9 Semi-finals	Cha-cha-cha / "Mustang Sally"	10	10	10	Eliminated

== Awards and nominations ==
List of awards and nominations
Year	Association	Category	Work	Result
1991	Young Artist Awards	Best Young Actress Supporting or Re-Occurring Role for a TV Series	Beverly Hills, 90210	Nominated
1991	Young Artist Awards	Outstanding Young Ensemble Cast in a Television Series (Shared with Jason Priestley, Shannen Doherty, Luke Perry, Brian Austin Green, Douglas Emerson, Ian Ziering, Gabrielle Carteris, Tori Spelling)	Beverly Hills, 90210	Nominated
1992	Young Artist Awards	Outstanding Young Ensemble Cast in a Television Series (Shared with Jason Priestley, Shannen Doherty, Luke Perry, Brian Austin Green, Douglas Emerson, Ian Ziering, Gabrielle Carteris, Tori Spelling)	Beverly Hills, 90210	Won
1992	Young Artist Awards	Best Young Actress Co-starring in a Television Series	Beverly Hills, 90210	Won
1992	Bravo Otto Awards	Best Female TV Star		Nominated
1993	Kids' Choice Awards	Favorite TV Actress	Beverly Hills, 90210	Nominated
1993	Young Artist Awards	Favorite Young Ensemble Cast in a Television Series (Shared with Jason Priestley, Shannen Doherty, Luke Perry, Brian Austin Green, Douglas Emerson, Ian Ziering, Gabrielle Carteris, Tori Spelling)	Beverly Hills, 90210	Won
1993	TV Guide Awards	Favorite Frenemies (Shared with Shannen Doherty)	Beverly Hills, 90210	Nominated
1993	TV Guide Awards	Favorite Ensemble (Shared with Tori Spelling, Brian Austin Green, Luke Perry, Jason Priestley, Shannen Doherty, Gabrielle Carteris, Ian Ziering)	Beverly Hills, 90210	Won
1993	Bravo Otto Awards	Best Female TV Star		Nominated
1994	Bravo Otto Awards	Best Female TV Star		Won
1999	Teen Choice Awards	TV – Choice Actress	Beverly Hills, 90210	Nominated
2005	Camie Awards	Camie Award (Shared with Robert Tate Miller, Charles Robinson, Victor Raider-Wexler, Kathryn Joosten, Joel McKinnon Miller, Steven Eckholdt, Barbara Billingsley, Sam Anderson, Cody Fleetwood and Ian Barry)	Secret Santa	Won
2008	Prism Awards	Outstanding Performance in a Miniseries	Girl, Positive	Won
2022	Canadian Screen Awards	Best Lead Actress, TV Movie	Left for Dead: The Ashley Reeves Story	Nominated

== Books ==
- Garth, Jennie (with Emily Heckman) (2014). Deep Thoughts From a Hollywood Blonde. New American Library. ISBN 0-451-24027-8.
- Garth, Jennie (2026). I Choose Me: Chasing Joy, Finding Purpose & Embracing Reinvention – A Heartfelt Celebrity Memoir and Inspirational Guide to Happiness and Aging with Confidence. Park Row Books. ISBN 0-778-30563-5.
