= WrestleMania X =

1994 World Wrestling Federation pay-per-view event

- Promotional poster
- Promotion: World Wrestling Federation
- Date: March 20, 1994
- City: Manhattan, New York
- Venue: Madison Square Garden
- Attendance: 18,065
- Buy rate: North America: 420,000
- Tagline: Ten Years in the Making

Pay-per-view chronology
| ← Previous; Royal Rumble | Next → King of the Ring |

WrestleMania chronology
| ← Previous; IX | Next → XI |

WrestleMania X was a 1994 professional wrestling pay-per-view (PPV) event produced by the World Wrestling Federation (WWF, renamed WWE in 2002). It was the 10th annual WrestleMania and took place on March 20, 1994, from Madison Square Garden (MSG) in the New York City borough of Manhattan, New York. It was the second WrestleMania at MSG, after the inaugural WrestleMania in 1985.

The central focus of the pay-per-view was the WWF Championship, which was defended in two matches. Due to Lex Luger and Bret Hart being named the co-winners of the 1994 Royal Rumble match, both challenged champion Yokozuna. Luger was first but was disqualified for pushing the referee. Bret then faced Yokozuna later in the evening and won the championship. This led to a lengthy worked feud between Bret and his brother Owen Hart, who had defeated Bret in the opening match of the pay-per-view.

Several other major feuds were also highlighted. Razor Ramon defeated Shawn Michaels in a Ladder match to resolve an angle in which the two had argued over the rightful holder of the WWF Intercontinental Championship. Bam Bam Bigelow gained revenge against Doink the Clown, with whom he had been feuding, by teaming with Luna Vachon to defeat Doink and his partner Dink. Randy Savage settled his feud with Crush by defeating him in a Falls Count Anywhere match.

The event received generally positive reviews, with much acclaim directed towards the Ladder match for the WWF Intercontinental Championship, along with the opening match between Owen and Bret Hart. WrestleMania X was the first edition of the event not to include Hulk Hogan, who had been seen as the public face of the WWF. The card also marked Randy Savage's last televised match for the company.

== Production ==
=== Background ===
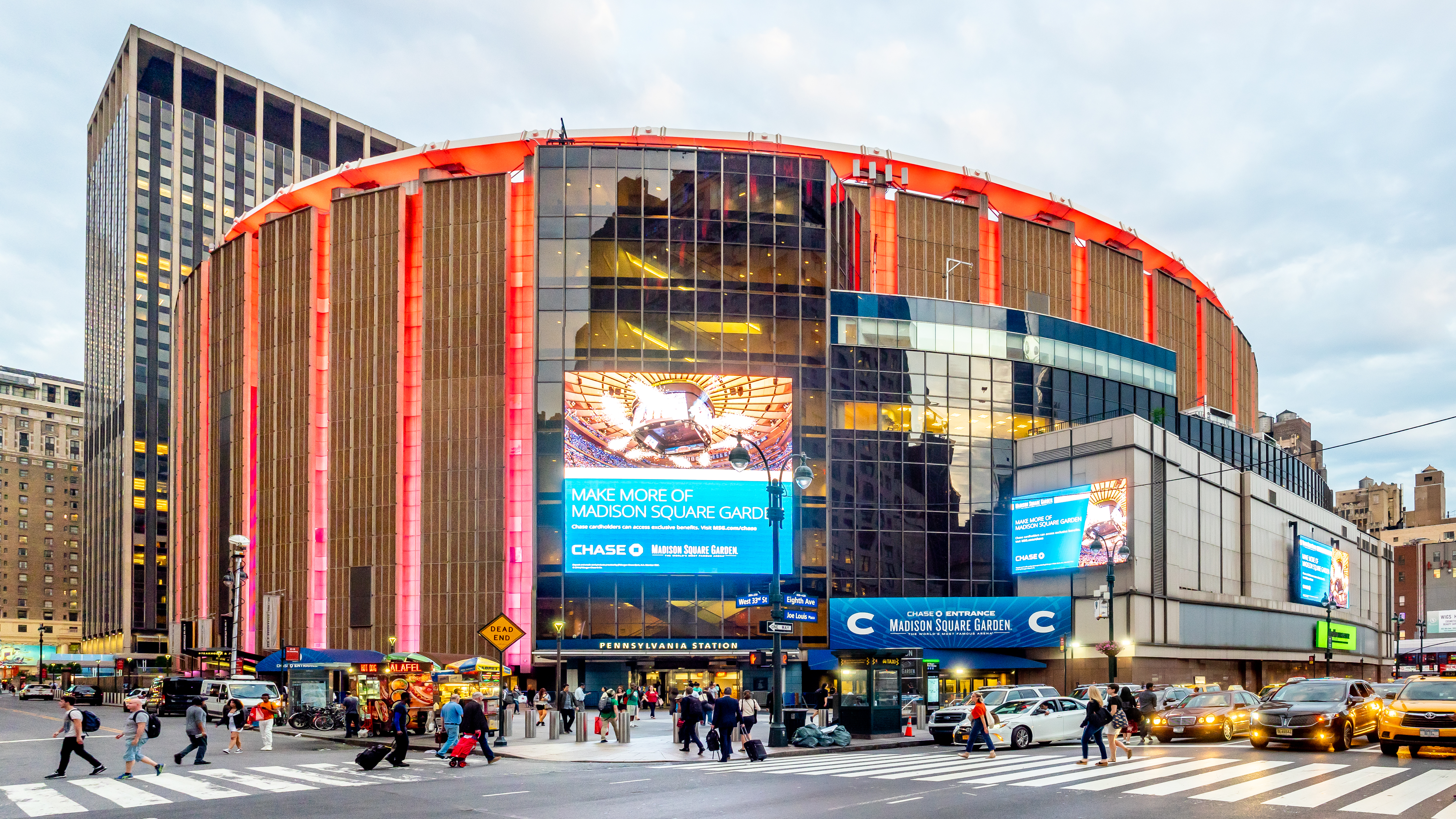
The 10th annual WrestleMania was the second time for the World Wrestling Federation's flagship event to be held at Madison Square Garden in the New York City borough of Manhattan, New York, after the inaugural 1985 event.

WrestleMania is considered the World Wrestling Federation's (WWF, renamed WWE in 2002) flagship professional wrestling pay-per-view (PPV) event, having first been held in 1985. It is held annually between mid-March to mid-April. It was the first of the WWF's original four PPVs, which includes Royal Rumble, SummerSlam, and Survivor Series, referred to as the "Big Four", and one of the "Big Five", along with King of the Ring that was established in 1993. WrestleMania X was scheduled to be held on March 20, 1994, from Madison Square Garden in the New York City borough of Manhattan, New York, the same venue as the first WrestleMania in 1985.

=== Storylines ===
The storyline surrounding the WWF Championship began at the 1994 Royal Rumble when the final two wrestlers, Lex Luger and Bret Hart, simultaneously eliminated each other. After a disagreement between two referees, Jack Tunney, the WWF President, declared Luger and Hart co-winners. Tunney announced that both wrestlers would get a WWF Championship match at WrestleMania, the prize given to the winner of the Royal Rumble match, and both wrestlers would have to wrestle two matches for the pay-per-view.

Tunney announced that a coin toss would be used to decide who faced Yokozuna for the belt first. If Luger won, he would face Yokozuna first. Hart would then wrestle his brother Owen Hart before facing the winner of the Luger-Yokozuna match. If Hart won the coin toss, he would get the first title shot, and Luger would wrestle Crush earlier on the card. On the January 31, 1994 episode of Monday Night Raw, Luger won the coin toss and the right to face Yokozuna first.

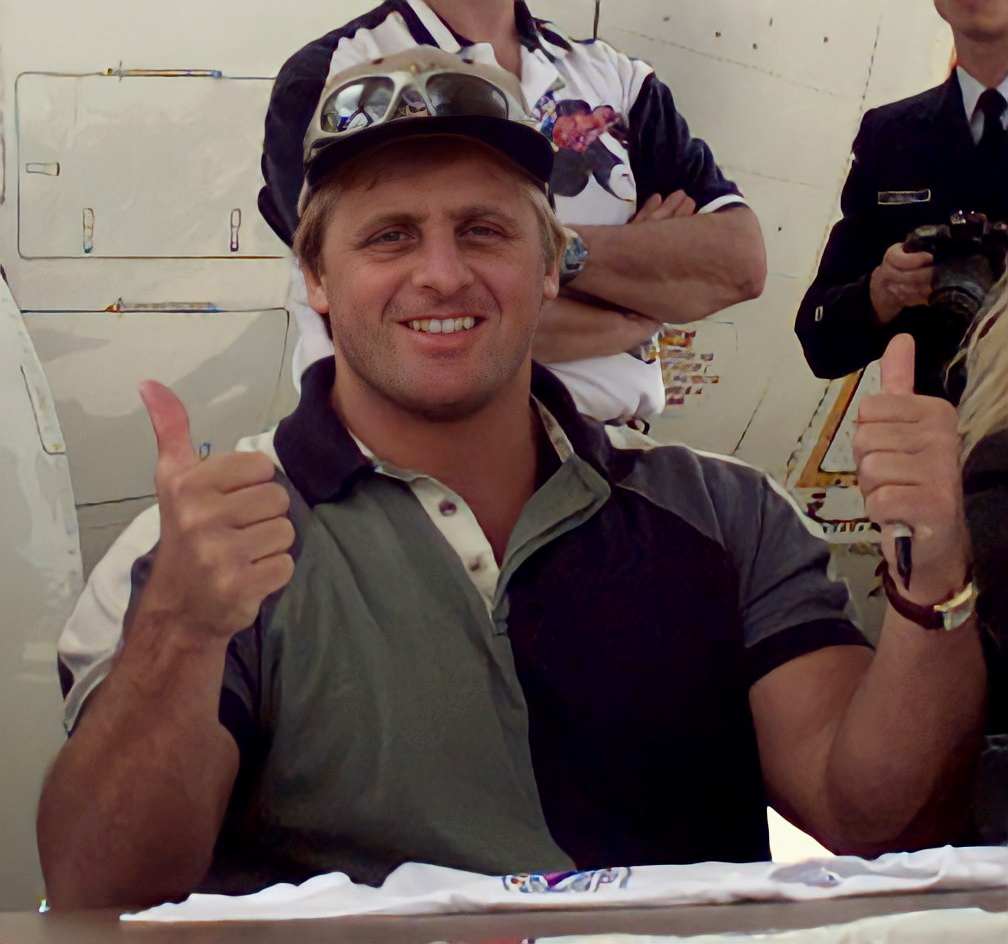
Owen Hart turned on his brother Bret, which set up the opening match at WrestleMania

Bret Hart was booked to face his brother Owen, with whom he was in the middle of a feud. The storyline between the Hart brothers began at Survivor Series 1993, where they were competing on the same side of an elimination match. As Owen was fighting in the ring, Bret, who had sustained a kayfabe injury, was staggering along the ring apron. Owen ran into Bret, causing Owen to lose his focus and get eliminated from the match. After the match, Owen returned to the ring and had a confrontation with Bret. In the following weeks, Owen demanded a match with Bret, but Bret refused to accept the challenge. Eventually, the storyline had the brothers reunite to face The Quebecers at Royal Rumble 1994. During the match, Bret sustained another kayfabe injury, causing the referee to end the match. In a planned turn, Owen got upset by the loss and attacked Bret to restart the feud.

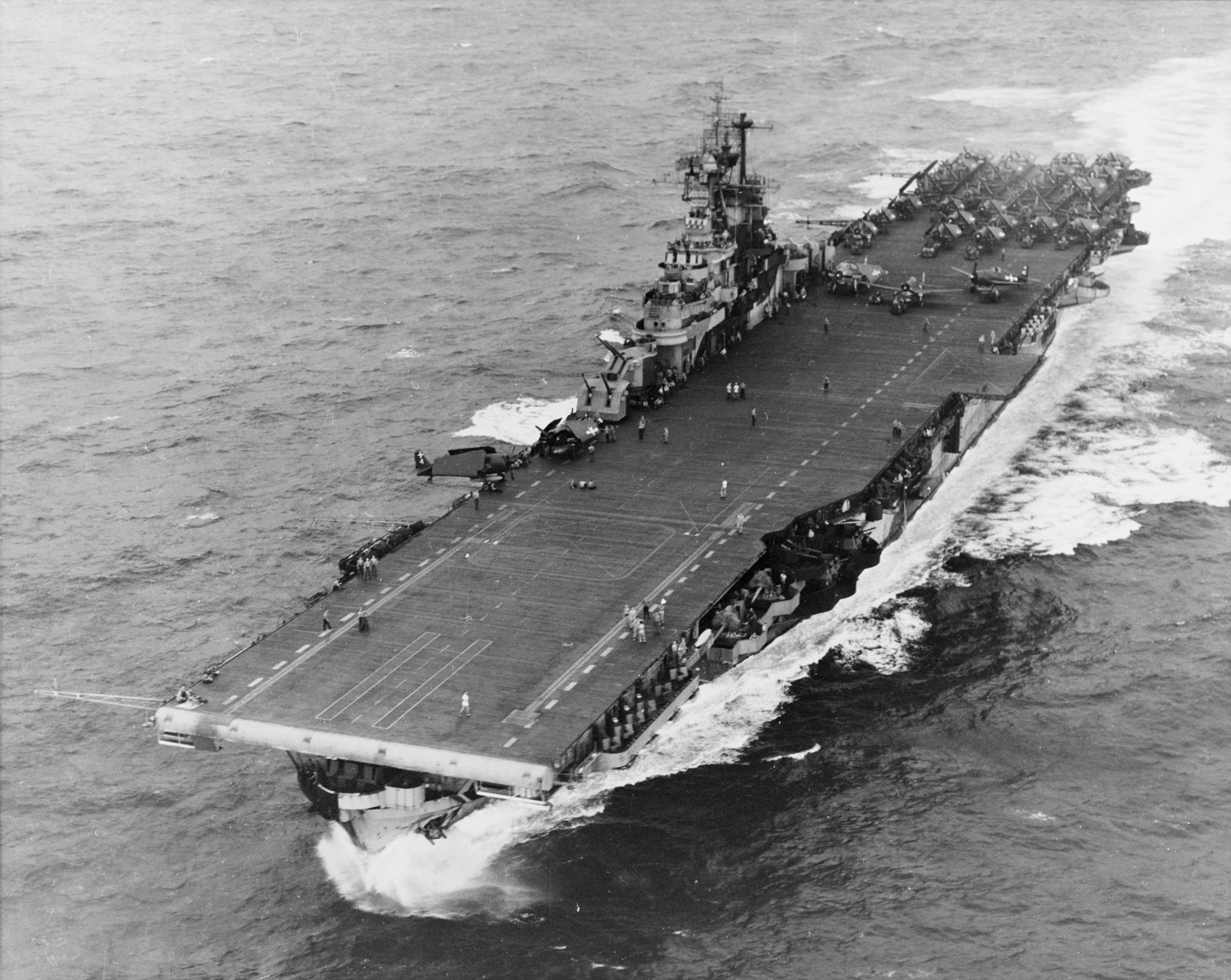
The feud between Yokozuna and Lex Luger began aboard the USS Intrepid

Luger's feud with Yokozuna began on July 4, 1993, at the Yokozuna Bodyslam Challenge. In June, Mr. Fuji, Yokozuna's manager, challenged all American athletes to attempt to bodyslam Yokozuna on the deck of the USS Intrepid. After several athletes failed, the storyline saw Luger arrive by helicopter and successfully bodyslam Yokozuna. This began a strong push for Luger, who was then scheduled to challenge Yokozuna for the WWF Championship at SummerSlam 1993. Luger won the match by countout but did not win the title. The WWF claimed that the match stipulations did not allow Luger a rematch. The storyline saw Luger campaigning for entry into the 1994 Royal Rumble, as he wanted the title shot that would be given to the winner. Luger was eventually entered into the match, although The Great Kabuki and Genichiro Tenryu were also entered, on Mr. Fuji's behalf, to attempt to prevent Luger from winning. Kabuki and Tenryu were unsuccessful, however, as Luger won the match and gained a match for the WWF Championship.

The storyline leading to the match between "Macho Man" Randy Savage and Crush focused on the supposedly strained friendship between the two wrestlers. On the July 12, 1993, episode of Monday Night Raw, Crush challenged Yokozuna for the WWF Championship. At the end of the match, Yokozuna performed the Banzai Drop to win the match. After the match, he performed three more Banzai Drops while various wrestlers ran to the ring to stop the attack. Savage eventually came to the ring to help Crush. Following the match, Crush was not seen on televised matches for several months, although he continued to appear at house shows. On October 18, Crush appeared on Monday Night Raw accompanied by Yokozuna and Yokozuna's manager, Mr. Fuji. Crush criticized Savage for not intervening sooner during the July 12 match. In a worked promo, Crush announced that he had turned against Savage and the United States in order to align himself with Yokozuna and Fuji. He then attacked Savage by dropping him on the ringside guard rail. Yokozuna performed the Banzai Drop on Savage before a group of referees came to the ring to break up the fight. During the November 8, 1993 episode of Monday Night Raw, Savage left his position as commentator to attack Crush. The following week, Jack Tunney announced that Savage was suspended from commentating as a result of the previous week's attack. The feud intensified at Survivor Series 1993 when Savage and Crush caused each other to be eliminated from their respective matches.

Bam Bam Bigelow and Doink the Clown was engaged in a feud that began in the fall of 1993. Doink annoyed Bigelow with a series of pranks, such as throwing water and confetti on him and tripping him with a broom. Bigelow retaliated against Doink and Doink's midget sidekick Dink. A match was booked for Survivor Series 1993, but Bigelow was unable to get revenge because Doink did not compete. Instead, the WWF prolonged the feud by having Bigelow's team face The Bushwhackers and Men on a Mission dressed as Doinks. The feud eventually culminated in a match scheduled for WrestleMania X. In the match, Bigelow and his storyline girlfriend Luna Vachon competed against Doink and Dink in a Mixed tag team match.

The feud between Razor Ramon and Shawn Michaels also dated back to the fall of 1993. Jack Tunney announced that he was stripping Michaels of the WWF Intercontinental Championship for not defending the title often enough. There have been reports that the real reason for vacating the title was because Michaels refused to drop the belt. Ramon won the title after competing in a battle royal and defeating Rick Martel, the other finalist in the match. In the angle, Michaels refused to acknowledge the title change, however, as he insisted that he was the true Intercontinental Champion. To gain revenge against Ramon for taking the belt, Michaels attacked Ramon and helped Irwin R. Schyster to steal Ramon's gold chains.

== Event ==
Other on-screen personnel
| Role: | Name: |
|---|---|
| Commentators | Vince McMahon |
| Commentators | Jerry Lawler |
| Interviewer | Todd Pettengill |
| Ring announcer | Bill Dunn |
| Ring announcer | Howard Finkel |
| Ring announcer | Donnie Wahlberg (Lex Luger vs. Yokozuna match) |
| Ring announcer | Burt Reynolds (Bret Hart vs. Yokozuna match) |
| Referee | Mike Chioda |
| Referee | Danny Davis |
| Referee | Jack Doan |
| Referee | Earl Hebner |
| Referee | Joey Marella |

In a dark match before the pay-per-view aired, The Heavenly Bodies faced The Bushwhackers. Near the end of the match, The Bushwhackers gained control when they performed the Battering Ram on Jimmy Del Ray. Tom Prichard, Del Ray's partner, attacked Bushwhacker Butch before he was able to pin Del Ray. This allowed Del Ray to recover and pin Butch to win the match. As the broadcast began, Vince McMahon and Jerry Lawler were introduced as commentators for the event and Little Richard sang "America the Beautiful".

The first televised match was between Bret and Owen Hart. The beginning of the match went back and forth with neither wrestler gaining a strong advantage. The tension between the two was demonstrated by Owen's bragging and Bret's refusal to let Owen leave the ring. Owen eventually gained momentum by using a camel clutch on Bret and performing suplexes and a Tombstone piledriver. When Owen stood outside the ring to recuperate, Bret jumped over the top rope to attack him. Bret landed awkwardly, however, and suffered a kayfabe injury to his knee. Owen used a figure four leglock to capitalize on Bret's sore leg. Bret was able to recover, and he kicked Owen in the back of the head and used a Bulldog and sleeper hold to weaken Owen. Owen regained the advantage, however, and applied the Sharpshooter on Bret. Bret was able to escape and perform a Sharpshooter on Owen. Bret then attempted to end the match with a victory roll, but Owen blocked it and pinned Bret to win the match.

Sy Sperling, the president of hair restoration company Hair Club for Men, appeared in the ring before the next match. He announced that he was at WrestleMania to introduce one of his latest clients, ring announcer Howard Finkel. Finkel came to the ring wearing a toupée, showing off his new hair while the crowd applauded. The match then began, as Bam Bam Bigelow and Luna Vachon came to the ring to face Doink the Clown and Dink. Bigelow attacked Doink at the beginning of the match with a dropkick and a powerslam. When Dink entered the match, the rules stated that Bigelow had to tag Vachon into the match. Dink ran around the ring avoiding Vachon, but she eventually caught him. She kicked him and powerslammed him, but she then missed a moonsault attempt. Doink and Bigelow re-entered the match, and Doink performed a DDT on Bigelow. Bigelow reversed the momentum to win the match after a diving headbutt on Doink. Bigelow pinned Doink to win the match, and he and Vachon then attacked Dink.

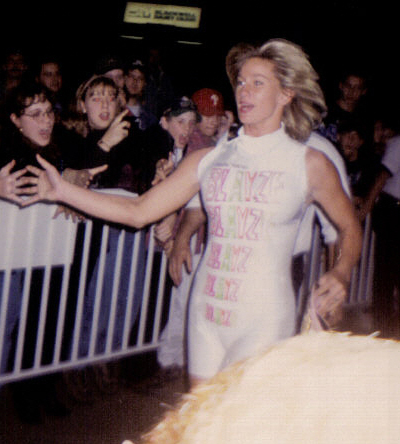
Alundra Blayze defeated Leilani Kai to retain the WWF Women's Championship

The next match was a Falls Count Anywhere match between Randy Savage and Crush. The rules stated that any time a wrestler was pinned, he then had to make it back inside the ring within sixty seconds or he would lose the match. Savage tried to attack Crush before the bell rang, but Crush reversed the attack. He used a tilt-a-whirl backbreaker to injure Savage and then dropped Savage across the guard rail to get the first pinfall. While Savage was returning to the ring, Mr. Fuji hit him with the Japanese flag to stall him. Savage made it back to the ring with two seconds remaining, so the match continued. Inside the ring, Crush tried to throw salt in Savage's eyes, but Savage countered by throwing the salt in Crush's eyes. Savage then performed a diving elbow drop and rolled Crush outside of the ring for the pinfall. Fuji helped revive Crush, which allowed Crush to return to the ring before the count had expired. Savage and Crush then brawled down the aisle and into a room backstage. Savage scored a pinfall and tied Crush's legs to a pulley. Crush was left hanging upside down and could not return to the ring, so Savage was declared the winner.

Alundra Blayze defended her WWF Women's Championship against Leilani Kai in the next match. Blayze began the match by using a leg sweep and two sunset flips. Kai came back with a powerslam and a suplex. Blayze got the win, however, by pinning Kai after performing a German suplex.

In the next match, Men on a Mission challenged The Quebecers for the WWF Tag Team Championship. Although The Quebecers attacked Men on a Mission before the bell, Mabel quickly recovered and clotheslined both Quebecers. The Quebecers used several double-team moves against their opponents, but Mabel reversed the momentum after Pierre missed a senton bomb. Mabel eventually missed an Avalanche, allowing The Quebecers to suplex him. The Quebecers performed an assisted senton on Mabel but did not get a pinfall. Men on a Mission regained the advantage, prompting The Quebecers' manager, Johnny Polo, to pull his wrestlers out of the ring. Men on a Mission won the match by countout, but they did not win the belts.

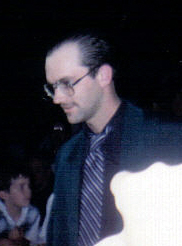
Harvey Wippleman had an altercation with Howard Finkel prior to the match between Adam Bomb and Earthquake

The first WWF Championship match came next, as Lex Luger challenged Yokozuna. Mr. Perfect was revealed to be the guest referee for the match, while Donnie Wahlberg was the guest ring announcer and Rhonda Shear was the guest timekeeper. After a verbal confrontation between Luger and Yokozuna, Luger gained the early advantage by knocking Yokozuna out of the ring. After getting back into the ring, Yokozuna removed the turnbuckle padding from a corner of the ring. Yokozuna used a nerve hold and a belly to belly suplex to wear down Luger. As he tried to throw Luger's head into the exposed turnbuckle, however, Luger blocked him and hit Yokozuna's head into the turnbuckle. Luger then performed clotheslines and a powerslam on Yokozuna before knocking Yokozuna kayfabe unconscious with a running forearm smash. Yokozuna's managers, Mr. Fuji and Jim Cornette jumped onto the ring apron to distract Luger, and Luger pulled them into the ring and attacked them. Luger covered Yokozuna, but Mr. Perfect was tending to the fallen managers and did not make the count. When Luger pushed him, Mr. Perfect disqualified Luger and left the ring, thereby turning heel.

Adam Bomb and his manager Harvey Wippleman entered the ring for the next match, and Wippleman criticized Finkel's new hair and tore the pocket off Finkel's suit. Earthquake came to the ring and attacked Bomb from behind. He powerslammed Bomb and performed the Earthquake splash to get the pinfall victory in thirty-five seconds.

For the Ladder match, the Intercontinental belts belonging to Razor Ramon and Shawn Michaels were both hanging above the ring, and the first wrestler to use the ladder to reach both belts would be declared the winner. Ramon began the match by chokeslamming Michaels. Michaels recovered, however, and performed a neckbreaker on Ramon. Michaels then threw Ramon out to the ringside, where Michaels' bodyguard Diesel clotheslined Ramon. Referee Earl Hebner responded by ordering Diesel to return to the dressing rooms. Ramon pulled up the padding from the concrete floor, but he was later thrown onto it after Michaels reversed Ramon's attempt to perform the Razor's Edge. While Ramon was lying on the floor, Michaels brought the ladder to the ring and used it to hit Ramon in the stomach, chest, and back. Michaels tried to retrieve the belts, but Ramon stopped him from climbing the ladder. Michaels then set the ladder up in the corner of the ring and performed a splash onto Ramon. Ramon recovered and Irish whipped Michaels into the ladder. He then hit Michaels with the ladder several times before both men tried to climb up to get the belts. Ramon suplexed Michaels off the ladder and tried to reach the belts. Michaels dropkicked the ladder, which caused Ramon to fall off. Michaels performed a superkick and a piledriver on Ramon and then propped the ladder up in the corner of the ring. Michaels climbed the turnbuckles, jumped onto the ladder, and used his weight to push it down across Ramon's chest. Michaels tried to retrieve the belts again, but Ramon pushed him off. Michaels fell into the ropes and got tangled up, allowing Ramon to get the belts and win the undisputed Intercontinental Championship.

A ten-man tag team match was supposed to take place next, but it was canceled due to time constraints. The kayfabe reason given was that the heel team (Irwin R. Schyster, The Headshrinkers, Rick Martel and Jeff Jarrett) could not agree on who would be the team's captain for the match. Their opponents were scheduled to be the face team of the 1–2–3 Kid, Sparky Plugg, Tatanka and The Smoking Gunns. Bob Holly ("Sparky Plugg"), stated in his 2013 autobiography The Hardcore Truth that the timekeeper backstage repeatedly told the referee over his earpiece to end the ladder match, but Michaels and Ramon ignored him and kept wrestling until officials were forced to cancel the tag team match.

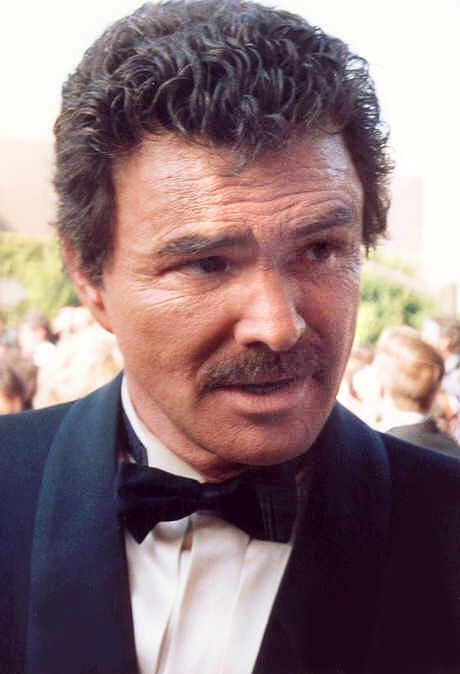
Burt Reynolds made an appearance as the guest ring announcer for the match between Bret Hart and Yokozuna

The final match of the night and main event was the WWF Championship match between Yokozuna and Bret Hart. The guest referee for the match was "Rowdy" Roddy Piper, while the guest ring announcer was Burt Reynolds and the guest timekeeper was Jennie Garth. Yokozuna attacked Hart before the bell, and Hart attempted a couple of comebacks in vain. Eventually, Yokozuna made a mistake and allowed Hart to knock him to the mat. Cornette tried to distract Piper, but Piper punched him and knocked him off the ring apron. Yokozuna performed a leg drop on Hart but then missed an Avalanche attempt. Bret maintained the advantage for a little while, but Yokozuna came back with a belly to belly suplex. When Yokozuna attempted the Banzai drop, however, he lost his balance and fell to the mat. Hart quickly pinned Yokozuna to win the title. This match also marked the first time in WWF (now WWE) history that two wrestlers faced each other in a WWF World Title match at two consecutive WrestleManias as well as Bret become first wrestler to win both Intercontinental Championship and World Championship at WrestleMania.

Afterwards, Bret Hart celebrated in the ring with several of the face wrestlers including Lex Luger, "Rowdy" Roddy Piper, Razor Ramon, Tatanka, The 1–2–3 Kid, Sparky Plugg and "Macho Man" Randy Savage. Others who joined in the celebration included Burt Reynolds, Rhonda Shear, Donnie Wahlberg, and WWF commentators Gorilla Monsoon and Vince McMahon. Owen Hart stood in the aisle, glaring at Bret, then quickly left; the brothers continued their feud for the remainder of 1994, with the WWF Championship often on the line.

== Reception ==
The event was attended by 18,065 people, who paid a total of $960,000 in admission fees. The buy-rate for this pay-per-view was 1.68, down from the 2.0 buy-rate that the previous WrestleMania had achieved.

The event received positive reviews from various websites and wrestling publications. In 2010, Rob McNew of 411mania gave the event an overall score of 9.0 out of 10.0 and noted that WrestleMania X "may lack a lot of historical significance due to being during a relative downtime for the business, but this show kicked all kinds of ass." He further noted that "Bret-Owen and Razor-Shawn were both coin flip choices for not only match of the year, but match of the decade as well." He concluded the review citing how WrestleMania X was "easily one of the top five Wrestlemania’s ever."

Much of the praise towards the event was aimed at the ladder match between Shawn Michaels and Razor Ramon. McNew of 411mania cited the match as "downright groundbreaking for the time" and an "amazing match that put the ladder match on the map." It received a five-star rating from Dave Meltzer and was voted Match of the Year (1994) by readers of his Wrestling Observer Newsletter publication. Pro Wrestling Illustrated readers also named that match PWI Match of the Year (1994). It was placed #3 on IGN's Top 20 Matches in Wrestlemania History and described as "one of the most ground-breaking matches in wrestling history".

The opening match between Owen Hart and Bret Hart has also garnered acclaim. McNew described it as the "best opening match in professional wrestling history". It was also #4 on the list of IGN's Top 20 Matches in Wrestlemania History; writer Jon Robinson described it as "the best opening match in pay-per-view history." Multi-time world champion Chris Jericho stated: "For me, the best match on [WrestleMania X] was always Bret vs. Owen, and it kicked off the show and it was hard to follow...the story was amazing, it was kind of Owen's coronation – it was a great moment". Mike "The General" Lambertson, a former professional wrestler from Deep South Wrestling and contributor to voicesofwrestling.com called the match “The greatest sports entertainment event in Madison Square Garden’s history” on episode 138 of the "Talk is Jericho" podcast.

== Aftermath ==
Men on a Mission continued to challenge The Quebecers for the tag team belts. Men on a Mission won the title on March 29, 1994. This is said to have been an unplanned title change, as Mabel accidentally fell on Pierre to get the pinfall. This title reign lasted only two days, however, as The Quebecers won the titles back in a rematch.

Lex Luger and Mr. Perfect were scheduled to face each other in a series of matches on the WrestleMania Revenge Tour. Mr. Perfect was replaced by Crush, however, and Mr. Perfect did not appear again in the WWF until Survivor Series 1995.

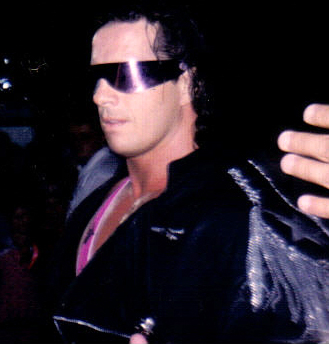
Bret Hart avenged his WrestleMania loss by defeating Owen Hart at SummerSlam.

Adam Bomb and Earthquake had a rematch on the April 4, 1994 episode of Monday Night Raw, which Earthquake won. The feud did not progress any further, as Earthquake left the WWF for World Championship Wrestling (WCW) in May 1994. Wippleman and Finkel wrestled a series of Tuxedo matches in 1994 that culminated in a match on the January 9, 1995 episode of Monday Night Raw. Finkel defeated Wippleman in a final Tuxedo match to end the feud.

A few weeks after the match between Shawn Michaels and Razor Ramon, Diesel begin to challenge Ramon for the Intercontinental championship. Michaels helped Diesel defeat Ramon for the title on April 13, 1994. This win began a push for Diesel that saw him win the WWF's Triple Crown Championship in one calendar year.

The ten-man tag team match took place on the April 4, 1994 edition of Monday Night Raw. The heel team won, as Irwin R. Schyster pinned the 1–2–3 Kid to win the match.

Bret and Owen Hart continued their feud throughout 1994. At King of the Ring, their real-life brother-in-law and Bret's former tag team partner Jim Neidhart became involved in the angle by helping Owen win the tournament. During the coronation ceremony, Owen announced that he wanted to be referred to as the "King of Harts". At SummerSlam, Bret successfully defended his title against Owen in a Steel cage match but was attacked after the match by Owen and Neidhart, prompting another brother-in-law, Davey Boy Smith, to get involved on Bret's side. At Survivor Series, the storyline saw Owen partially responsible for costing Bret the WWF Championship. Bret faced Bob Backlund in a match with the stipulation that the winner would be declared when a competitor's cornerman threw a towel into the ring to signify a submission. After Owen caused Smith to knock himself unconscious, Owen pretended to feel sympathy for Bret. While Backlund had Bret in a crossface Chickenwing, the angle had Owen convince his mother Helen to throw in Bret's towel, enabling Backlund to win the match and the title. After the match, Owen celebrated with Backlund and showed that he was faking the concern for his brother.

== Home media and streaming ==
The event was released on VHS by Coliseum Video in the United States and by Silver Vision in the United Kingdom. The British version of the tape, unlike the American release, also included the pre-show "Countdown" broadcast. Both versions included material shot exclusively for the video which was not broadcast during the event itself.

It was re-released on DVD in the United Kingdom in May 2006 as part of Silver Vision's Tagged Classics range, and was paired with WrestleMania IX. This DVD set was not released in the USA.

In 2014, the event was included on the WWE's streaming platform the WWE Network as part of its launch and remained on the service until the platform closed in 2026. As of September 2026, subscribers in multiple territories, including the US, Canada and the UK, can stream the event on Netflix, thanks to the WWE's ten-year agreement with the company.

== Results ==
| No. | Results | Stipulations | Times |
|---|---|---|---|
| 1^{D} | The Heavenly Bodies (Tom Prichard and Jimmy Del Ray) (with Jim Cornette) defeated The Bushwhackers (Luke and Butch) | Tag team match | — |
| 2 | Owen Hart defeated Bret Hart | Singles match | 20:21 |
| 3 | Bam Bam Bigelow and Luna Vachon defeated Doink the Clown and Dink the Clown | Mixed tag team match | 6:09 |
| 4 | Randy Savage defeated Crush (with Mr. Fuji) | Falls Count Anywhere match | 9:49 |
| 5 | Alundra Blayze (c) defeated Leilani Kai | Singles match for the WWF Women's Championship | 3:20 |
| 6 | Men on a Mission (Mabel and Mo) (with Oscar) defeated The Quebecers (Jacques and Pierre) (c) (with Johnny Polo) by countout | Tag team match for the WWF Tag Team Championship | 7:41 |
| 7 | Yokozuna (c) (with Mr. Fuji and Jim Cornette) defeated Lex Luger by disqualification | Singles match for the WWF Championship; Mr. Perfect was the special guest referee. | 14:40 |
| 8 | Earthquake defeated Adam Bomb (with Harvey Wippleman) | Singles match | 0:35 |
| 9 | Razor Ramon (c) defeated Shawn Michaels (with Diesel) by retrieving the championship belts | Ladder match for the Undisputed WWF Intercontinental Championship | 18:47 |
| 10 | Bret Hart defeated Yokozuna (c) (with Mr. Fuji and Jim Cornette) | Singles match for the WWF Championship; Roddy Piper was the special guest referee. | 10:38 |
(c) / – the champion(s) heading into the match; D / – this was a dark match
