= The Vanished (2020 film) =

2020 film directed by Peter Facinelli

- Film poster
- Directed by: Peter Facinelli
- Written by: Peter Facinelli
- Produced by: Peter Facinelli; Sasha Yelaun; Jeff Elliott; Brandon Menchen
- Starring: Thomas Jane; Anne Heche; Jason Patric; Peter Facinelli
- Cinematography: Cory Geryak
- Edited by: Vaughn Bien III
- Music by: Sacha Chaban
- Production companies: The Exchange; Ingenious Media; SSS Entertainment
- Distributed by: Saban Films
- Release date: August 21, 2020
- Running time: 115 minutes
- Country: United States
- Language: English

The Vanished (formerly titled Hour of Lead) is a 2020 American psychological thriller film written and directed by Peter Facinelli. The film stars Thomas Jane, Anne Heche, Jason Patric and Facinelli and follows a couple who sets out to find their daughter who disappeared during their camping trip.

== Plot ==
Paul and Wendy Michaelson take their RV to a remote lakeside campsite with their daughter Taylor and pug Lucky. Paul meets Miranda, an attractive woman in the neighboring campsite, while Wendy is getting supplies. However, when Wendy returns, they discover Taylor has disappeared.

They contact the manager Tom but have no luck. Sheriff Baker and Deputy Rakes organize a search party but tell Paul and Wendy to stay put. After 24 hours, Paul and Wendy file a missing persons report and also learn there is an escaped convict in the area but that he is unlikely to be the suspect. Paul and Wendy decide to conduct their own search and eventually find a man sleeping at a campfire with a gun beside him. Assuming he is the escapee, Wendy grabs his gun. The sleeper awakens and grabs at the gun, only to be shot. The next day, the sheriff tells them the convict was caught on a bus leaving town, and a camper was found shot to death. Paul and Wendy realize Wendy shot an innocent man.

As local authorities are getting more involved, Paul and Wendy grow more suspicious of Miranda and her husband Eric. While the latter are gone Paul and Wendy search their RV but fail to see a strand of beads belonging to their daughter Taylor. That night, Paul observes Miranda making love. The next day the two couples go out on the lake together to continue the search. After six hours on the lake, they spot a plastic bag floating on the water, but it holds no clues. Paul and Wendy accuse Eric and Miranda of taking their daughter because they have been unsuccessful in trying to have a baby. Wendy pulls out a gun, and a fight ensues in which Miranda is shot and Eric is stabbed. Paul and Wendy return to shore, shaken, and argue. When Baker finds Eric's body, he searches Eric and Miranda's RV and finds the beads, which Wendy confirms is her daughter's. Baker is informed later that strands of hair were in Eric's hand.

Later, Wendy suspects Tom might be responsible, so she searches his place, uncovering a hidden passageway leading to a toilet and a closet shelf with a stash of child pornography videos. She is knocked out and bound. After Tom diverts Paul from looking for her, he tries to hold Wendy down, but she finds a hammer on the floor and kills Tom. Baker suspects Tom was part of a child pornography network, and with the case seemingly solved, Paul convinces Wendy to throw away Taylor's stuff to bring closure. The items are later recovered by Tom's groundskeeper Justin, who has been having his own issues. He urgently tries to call police but cannot get through.

Baker eventually receives a Dear John letter from his wife but then notices something strange about a photo of the Michaelsons—they are posed in front of the World Trade Center before the September 11 attacks and Wendy is pregnant in the picture, implying that Taylor would have been much older than 10 years old. After contacting another police network, he learns from Paul's brother that their daughter had died six years before and the Michaelsons have actually been living out a fantasy in which they think their daughter is still alive because they have been unable to successfully go through the stages of grief. Rakes confirms the DNA from the hair in Eric's hand belonged to Paul.

Flashbacks show the couple murdering Eric and Miranda, Paul planting the beads in the RV and Justin discovering the blanket which has the daughter's real birth date printed on it. The police return to the campsite, but in Wendy and Paul's spot, they find another RV couple who momentarily lose their child and worry she was taken by the Michaelsons, but the child reappears. The Michaelsons have already left the campsite and are reliving their memories with Taylor who is playing on their RV's video screen.

== Cast ==
- Thomas Jane as Paul Michaelson
- Anne Heche as Wendy Michaelson
- Jason Patric as Sheriff Baker
- Peter Facinelli as Deputy Rakes
- Aleksei Archer as Miranda, a woman in her 30s that catches the eye of Paul and Tom
- Kristopher Wente as Eric, Miranda's husband
- Sadie and K.K. Heim as Taylor, Paul and Wendy's 10-year-old daughter
- John D. Hickman as Tom, the campsite manager
- Alex Haydon as Justin, the campsite groundskeeper

== Production ==
Early in development, Laurence Fishburne was being considered to star. Filming occurred in February 2019. The movie was filmed in Tuscaloosa, Alabama.

== Release ==
The film was released in select theaters, VOD and digital platforms on August 21, 2020.

== Reception ==
The film has a 20% rating based on 15 reviews on review aggregator Rotten Tomatoes. Jeffrey M. Anderson of Common Sense Media awarded the film two stars out five. Glenn Kenny of RogerEbert.com awarded the film three stars, writing:

[The] wrap up got me good, enough to make me admire Facinelli's ambition and handling of mechanics. The movie’s original title was “Hour of Lead,” a phrase from the Emily Dickinson poem that is laid out in white type before the opening credits. One can see why a film distributor or producer might not want that as a title. The movie is certainly not leaden; nor is it as generic as its current title might indicate.
