= Danielle Steel's Star =

- Genre: Drama; Romance
- Based on: Star by Danielle Steel
- Written by: Claire Labine
- Directed by: Michael Miller
- Starring: Jennie Garth; Craig Bierko; Terry Farrell
- Music by: Lee Holdridge

Production
- Executive producer: Douglas S. Cramer
- Producer: Elaine Rich
- Production locations: Arden Villa - 1145 Arden Road, Pasadena, California
- Cinematography: Alex Nepomniaschy
- Editor: Janet Bartels-Vandagriff
- Production companies: NBC Productions (in association with) Schoolfield Productions; The Cramer Company

Original release
- Network: NBC
- Release: September 20, 1993

Danielle Steel's Star is a 1993 American made-for-television film starring Jennie Garth, Craig Bierko, Terry Farrell, Penny Fuller and Mitchell Ryan. This film is based on the 1989 novel Star by author Danielle Steel and is set in the 1970s. It was directed by Michael Miller and written by Danielle Steel and Claire Labine. Crystal Wyatt's singing voice during the song Timeless Love was performed by Megon McDonough (credited as Megan McDonough).

== Plot ==
Jennie Garth plays Crystal Wyatt, a sweet country girl who dreams of becoming a singer. When her father dies, her mother is very jealous and cruel to her. After her brother-in-law rapes her in the barn, Crystal immediately tells her mother (who has never really loved her) asking for support, but her mother refuses to believe her. Crystal confronts her brother-in-law with a shotgun, but in the fight her brother is shot dead. Crystal runs away to San Francisco, where she becomes a waitress and singer. She falls for a charitable lawyer and kind army man, Spencer. They, though he is years older, have had chemistry from the beginning and later begin a passionate relationship in her tumultuous life. Crystal rises up to stardom with her looks and voice and competes with life's circumstances to be with the man she adores. However, Spencer is to be engaged with a woman named Elizabeth, a socialite who wants her life to be perfect and ordered. As Crystal's life winds down, Spencer's marriage and patience dwindles. Eventually, Crystal becomes pregnant and moves in with her childhood friend (played by Bryan Smith) with Spencer's child, but wants to let him get his life in order before they can be together. Eventually, he quits his associations with the higher-ups, quits his marriage, and goes back to Crystal, where he discovers her with his 5-year-old son, Zeb. The movie ends on a happy note, even with much history been had, and it is assumed that they live the rest of their lives out in a storybook romance.

== Cast ==
- Jennie Garth as Crystal Wyatt
- Craig Bierko as Spencer Hill
- Terry Farrell as Elizabeth
- Penny Fuller as Olivia Wyatt
- Roxanne Reese as Pearl
- Mitchell Ryan as Harrison Barclay
- Jim Haynie as Tad Wyatt
- Melendy Britt as Priscilla Barclay
