= Telling You =

- Theatrical film poster
- Directed by: Robert DeFranco
- Written by: Denis Flood; Marc Palmieri
- Produced by: Christopher DeFranco; David DuPuy
- Starring: Peter Facinelli; Jennifer Love Hewitt; Matthew Lillard; Dash Mihok
- Cinematography: Mark Doering-Powell
- Edited by: Jonathan Cates; Louis F. Cioffi
- Music by: Sean Hall; Russ Landau; Tom Romero
- Production companies: CineTel Films; Division I Entertainment Inc.
- Distributed by: Miramax Films
- Release date: August 7, 1998
- Running time: 94 minutes
- Country: United States
- Language: English
- Box office: $2,735

Telling You, also known as Love Sucks!, is a 1998 romantic comedy film directed by Robert DeFranco and starring Peter Facinelli, Jennifer Love Hewitt, Matthew Lillard, and Dash Mihok. It was distributed by Miramax and released on August 7, 1998.

== Plot ==
Two college graduates find themselves back home in Long Island stuck behind the counter of a pizza parlor and frustrated about their life's perspectives, while their friends move on, struggle to find a new direction for their lives.

== Cast ==
- Peter Facinelli as Phil Fazzulo
- Jennifer Love Hewitt as Deb Freidman
- Matthew Lillard as Adam Ginesberg
- Dash Mihok as Dennis Nolan
- Andy Berman as Howard Gurtler
- Robert DeFranco as Steve Fagan
- Gary Wolf as John Foley
- Richard Libertini as Mr. P
- Gina Philips as Kristen Barrett
- Jennifer Jostyn as Beth Taylor
- Frank Medrano as Sal Lombardo
- Jensen Daggett as Susan
- Shanna Moakler as Cheryl Tangeri
- Charlotte Ayanna as Allison Fazio (as Charlotte Lopez)
- Marc Bossley as Tommy Spahn
- Stephanie Brown as Michelle Itzo
- Gerald Jennke as Michelle Itzo's Neighbor
- Michelle Burke as Kristen's Friend (as Michelle Thomas)
- Andrea Tiano as Maria (Sal's Sister)
- Mike Muldoon as Jerry (Sal's Brother-in-Law)
- Jack Rourke as Murph
- Rick Rossovich as McQueeney (uncredited)
- Jennie Garth as Amber (uncredited)
- Lorin Eric Salm as Lettuce Man
- John Bachelder as Lombardo's Customer
- Stephen "Bundy" DeFranco as Bundy
- Paul Anthony as Rough Stranger
- Kerri Kleiner as Allison's Friend
- Liz Reese as Telephone Montage
- Jennifer Foley as Amy
- Jon Cellini as Tough Guy
- Joe Crusco as Police Officer

== Release ==
It premiered in August 1998 with a special screening at the studio lot of Paramount Pictures (who would later acquire the rights to Telling You and all other Miramax films in 2020).

=== Home video ===
In 1999, the film was released on VHS by Buena Vista Home Entertainment, with a DVD following on June 27, 2000. In the United Kingdom (Region 2) the film was released on DVD under the title Love Sucks!

In 2010, Miramax was sold by The Walt Disney Company (their owners since 1993), with the studio being taken over by private equity firm Filmyard Holdings that same year. Filmyard sublicensed the home video rights for several Miramax titles to Echo Bridge Entertainment. Miramax was then taken over by Qatari company beIN Media Group during March 2016. In April 2020, ViacomCBS (now known as Paramount Skydance) acquired the rights to Miramax's library, after buying a 49% stake in the studio from beIN. Paramount Pictures has distributed Telling You since April 2020.

== Reception ==
On Rotten Tomatoes the film has an approval rating of 20% based on reviews from 5 critics.

Nathan Rabin of The A.V. Club called it "really boring in an extremely earnest fashion." Rabin warned that it "is not, as its box would somewhat dishonestly indicate, a Jennifer Love Hewitt vehicle. It is, instead, a laughless, irritatingly earnest comedy-drama about ..." the characters played by Mihok and Facinelli. Rabin said Hewitt and Lillard have little more than cameos but credits Lillard for giving the film what little spark it has.

Kathleen Craughwell of Los Angeles Times said it "is pleasant enough and the production values are as good as any studio film. But the characters and what happens to them...just aren't as interesting as these actors, and their audience, deserve."

Variety said "the film lacks the punch, craft or insight to reach a wide audience".
