= Girl, Positive =

- DVD cover
- Genre: Drama
- Written by: Nancey Silvers
- Directed by: Peter Werner
- Starring: Andrea Bowen; Jennie Garth
- Music by: Richard Marvin
- Country of origin: United States
- Original language: English

Production
- Executive producers: Lauren Dale; Nancey Silvers; Robert M. Sertner; Frank von Zerneck
- Producers: Christopher Morgan; Randy Sutter
- Cinematography: Neil Roach
- Editor: David Beatty
- Running time: 88 minutes
- Production company: Von Zerneck/Sertner Films
- Budget: $1.5 million

Original release
- Network: Lifetime
- Release: June 25, 2007

Girl, Positive (typically stylized as Girl, Posi+ive) is a 2007 American drama television film directed by Peter Werner, written by Nancey Silvers, and starring Andrea Bowen and Jennie Garth. The film is about a preppy teenage girl who discovers she is HIV positive after a summer one-night stand with a boy. It aired on Lifetime on June 25, 2007.

== Plot ==
Rachel, a high school girl, seems to have the life that most people envy: she has a steady boyfriend, great friends, and a place on the school's soccer team. Preparing for college and separating from her boyfriend are the main worries of this teen, as she lives a carefree life like most girls her age. However, Rachel's world falls apart the day she discovers that Jason, the guy whom she lost her virginity to at a party and died in a car accident a few months ago, was HIV positive and a heavy IV drug user.

Rachel immediately goes to an AIDS clinic to get a rapid swab test, which comes back positive. Devastated by the fact that she may actually be infected with the virus, Rachel then confides in her substitute teacher, Sarah, who has secretly been living with the disease for years. But both young women are about to find out their secrets will not be kept secret for very long, as word begins to spread throughout their high school and rumors fly, making some of these students realize that they may not be as "invincible" as they think they are.

== Cast ==
- Andrea Bowen as Rachel Sandler
- Jennie Garth as Sarah Bennett
- Nathan Anderson as Tim Willey
- Evan Gamble as Greg Markwell
- Rhoda Griffis as Karen Sandler
- Erik von Detten as Jason
- S. Epatha Merkerson as Ariel Winters

== Production ==
Filming took place in New Orleans.

== Accolades ==
- Television Academy Honors
