= An Unfinished Affair =

1996 television film directed by Rod Hardy

- DVD cover
- Genre: Drama; Thriller
- Written by: Rama Laurie Stagner; Dan Witt
- Directed by: Rod Hardy
- Starring: Jennie Garth; Tim Matheson; Leigh Taylor-Young; Peter Facinelli
- Music by: Lee Holdridge
- Country of origin: United States
- Original language: English

Production
- Executive producer: Jennie Garth
- Producers: Dan Witt; Ronnie D. Clemmer; Richard P. Kughn; Bill Pace; William Shippey
- Cinematography: David Connell
- Editor: Richard Bracken
- Running time: 91 minutes
- Production companies: Blue Puddle Productions; Longbow Productions; RHI Entertainment

Original release
- Network: ABC
- Release: April 29, 1996

An Unfinished Affair is a 1996 American television film directed by Rod Hardy and starring Jennie Garth, Tim Matheson, Leigh Taylor-Young, and Peter Facinelli. The film originally premiered on ABC and is now frequently aired on Lifetime.

== Plot ==
In Tucson, Arizona, Alex Connor (Tim Matheson) is a college teacher whose wife Cynthia (Leigh Taylor-Young) is in remission from cancer. Sheila Hart (Jennie Garth), one of his art students, invites him to her apartment to see a painting of hers. He reluctantly goes with her, but then tells her the brief affair they had while he was struggling with Cynthia's illness is over. Sheila is heartbroken, and reveals that she expected Alex to marry her when Cynthia died. Alex returns several days later to retrieve a pornographic Japanese silk screen painting he had lent her. He was never supposed to have given it to her, and there will be legal repercussions if it's discovered. Sheila refuses to return it, saying he had given it to her as a gift, and tells him to leave, before beginning to ignore his calls.

Alex has just gotten his adult son Rick (Peter Facinelli) a job at an art warehouse, where Alex works for his father-in-law and Rick's grandfather, Clayton (Michael Fairman). Rick is told to get back the missing silk screen, and Alex doesn't tell either of them that he knows who has it. Rick jokes with a coworker about a poster on the wall there of dogs playing Poker. Sheila meets Rick at a yoga class, and they go on a date. Rick explains to her that he used to have a violent temper. He once found his fiancee having an affair with his roommate, and he beat up his roommate. Alex had to step in and pay when the roommate sued Rick. As a result, Alex and Rick have a somewhat tense relationship. He feels like the black sheep in the family. Sheila explains that her mother is in a nursing home, and that she is a Canadian and does not have a green card. Having shared these secrets with each other, they kiss.

Alex has been calling Sheila about the silk screen, and now her number is disconnected. After a romantic evening with his wife, he leaves and tries to sneak into Sheila's apartment, only to find that she has moved and the apartment is empty. Back at the warehouse, a detective who is an expert in stolen art has been brought on to find the silk screen. Alex again doesn't share that he knows where it is.

Rick brings his new girlfriend to Thanksgiving dinner with his family, and Alex is shocked to find that it is Sheila. Sheila is unfazed and pretends not to know him in front of the family, but in private, she tells Alex that she sought out Rick on purpose and implies that she wants to punish Alex for hurting her. After failing to convince Sheila to give him her new contact information, Alex goes to the warehouse and snoops through Rick's things to find it. When Rick catches him at it and accuses him of "checking up" on him, Alex lies about what he was searching for. When he arrives home, a man named Dwight Bennet (Michael Massee) has sneaked into Alex's garage and threatens him. He reveals that he knows the silk screen is missing and plans to blackmail him. Instead, Alex offers him $15,000 to break into Sheila's apartment and steal it.

Sheila photographs the silk screen with a Polaroid camera, and then carefully tapes the screen behind another painting to hide it. Alex calls Sheila, and she taunts him, suggesting that she is manipulating Rick, and then hangs up on him. Sheila and Rick visit Sheila's nonverbal mother in the nursing home, and Sheila hangs the painting with the silk screen hidden behind it on the wall. Later, Dwight breaks into Sheila's apartment and attacks her. He holds her at knifepoint and asks where the silk screen is. Sheila guesses that Alex paid him to come after her, and offers to pay him more so that he'll leave her alone. Alex calls immigration to report Sheila.

One day, Rick and Sheila are interrupted by her phone ringing. She snaps at the caller that if he calls again, she will call the cops. She and Rick argue because she doesn't want to tell him who it is. Finally, she tells him the caller is her mean ex, who keeps calling and threatening her. Later, immigration catches up with Sheila. She discovers she has one month before she will be deported to Canada. She tells Rick that her ex must have sent them after her. Rick invites Sheila on vacation with his family, where they announce their engagement. Sheila has charmed everyone in the family except for Alex. She admits to the family that she was once having an affair with a married man, but that she learned a valuable lesson and was lucky to have met Rick.

Several of them decide to go dirtbiking together. Sheila and Cynthia end up splitting off from Alex and Rick, and Cynthia falls off her bike and over a cliff. Sheila considers leaving her where she is dangling from a branch, but she sees Alex approaching and quickly saves her. Alex once again accuses her in private, and once again she taunts him, telling him that if he tells the family about her, she will share that he cheated on Cynthia while Cynthia was suffering from cancer. That night, she steals a gun from Clayton's gun case. After Sheila returns home, Dwight again breaks into her apartment and demands the money she promised him. She explains that she doesn't have it, but offers him the silk screen painting instead. She tells him it's behind a cabinet, but when he searches for it, she stabs him in the back with a knife wrapped in a plastic bag. As he bleeds to death on the floor, she first calls Rick and says her mean ex is on her doorstep. She hangs up, and Rick calls again, leaving a frantic message on her answering machine that if her ex hurts her, he will kill him. Then Sheila calls 911 and says simply, "Help, he's got a knife," and gives her address. Then she retrieves the Polaroids of the screen and leaves the apartment. Rick races to Sheila's apartment to find Dwight dead and the knife beside him. The police arrive, and he runs from them.

Alex is visited by detectives, who tell him what happened. Alex tells them he believes Rick is being framed, but does not give them a suspect with a motive. They advise that if Alex hears from Rick, he must report him to the police. After they leave, Alex confesses to Cynthia about the affair and that he believes Sheila is behind this. Cynthia tells Alex that he has ruined everything. Rick calls Alex for help, and Alex leaves to meet him at the art warehouse. At the warehouse, Alex admits to Rick that he is the married man Sheila had an affair with. Rick is angry with Alex, but Alex is able to sow doubt in him about Sheila by asking why she isn't clearing Rick's name with the police as they speak.

Sheila has gone to the nursing home to say goodbye to her mother and retrieve the hidden silk screen, but finds that it is missing from the back of the painting. She hurries out of the building and is met by Rick in the parking lot. Rick shows her that he is holding a rolled painting and accuses her with everything he knows. He tells her that he went looking for her at the nursing home, and then realized she was the one hiding the silk screen painting. Alex also arrives, and he and Sheila each try to convince Rick the other is the one tricking him. Ultimately, Sheila shoots at Alex with Clayton's gun and steals the painting from Rick. She boards a plane to Vancouver, and only while waiting for the plane to take off does she realize it wasn't the silk screen painting she retrieved from Rick, but the poster of dogs playing Poker. The police stop the plane from taking off, and a stunned and enraged Sheila is arrested and taken away in a police car, while Rick and Alex return home together.

== Cast ==
- Jennie Garth as Sheila Hart
- Tim Matheson as Alex Connor
- Leigh Taylor-Young as Cynthia Connor
- Peter Facinelli as Rick Connor
- Michael Fairman as Clayton Edmunds
- Georgann Johnson as Mimi
- Michael Massee as Dwight Bennett

== Production ==
Garth has expressed her experiences on the film during a 1996 interview: "I had a good time with it. It's a good story with no hidden messages. It's a thriller, a suspenser. Pure entertainment. [..] It's always fun to play the bad girl. It gets kind of boring to be nice, you know?"

Garth co-produced the film, which included that she took part in hiring the writers, directors and actors, "as well as the overall feel of the film. I like to be sure that they're going to be made into things that I want to be a part of. Because things can go easily awry, and you can easily end up with a typical movie-of-the-week formula."

== See also ==
- List of television films produced for American Broadcasting Company
