= FANatic =

- Country of origin: United States

Production
- Running time: 30 minutes

Original release
- Network: MTV
- Release: July 6, 1998 – April 17, 2000

FANatic is an American television series created by Ed Connolly and executive produced by Deborah Norton and Ed Connolly of Norton Connolly Productions, that was shown on the MTV network in the late 1990s. Fans sent in submission tapes in hopes of being picked as the video subject's number one fan. They then would meet and interview them.

== Episodes ==
=== Season 1 ===
Episode #	Featured celebrities	Original airdate
101	Wesley Snipes, Van Halen	7/6/1998
102	Jennifer Love Hewitt, Boyz II Men	7/7/1998
103	Usher, Green Day	7/8/1998
104	Bruce Willis, Backstreet Boys	7/9/1998
105	Mase, Everclear	7/10/1998
106	Matchbox 20, Susan Lucci	7/13/1998
107	Wallflowers, Cindy Crawford	7/14/1998
108	Busta Rhymes, Third Eye Blind	7/15/1998
109	Robert Plant & Jimmy Page, Kobe Bryant	7/16/1998
110	Natalie Imbruglia, Jamie Foxx	7/17/1998
111	Queen Latifah, *NSYNC	7/18/1998
112	Dave Navarro, Tia & Tamera Mowry	7/19/1998
113	Aaliyah, Ben Stiller	7/20/1998
114	Metallica, Derek Jeter	7/21/1998
115	Jerry Springer, Lenny Kravitz	7/24/1998
116	Steven Tyler, Tyson Beckford	7/28/1998
117	Shaquille O'Neal, Ozzy Osbourne	7/29/1998
118	Spice Girls, "Stone Cold" Steve Austin	8/3/1998
119	Drew Carey, Aaliyah	8/4/1998
120	Missy Elliott, Tara Lipinski	8/5/1998
121	Jean-Claude Van Damme, Blues Traveler	8/6/1998
122	Dave Navarro, Carmen Electra	8/10/1998
123	Hanson, David Boreanaz	8/11/1998
124	Hootie & The Blowfish, Melissa Joan Hart	8/11/1998
125	Next, Richard Simmons	8/12/1998
126	Wyclef Jean, Jeff Gordon	8/13/1998
127	Stevie Nicks, Bryan Adams	8/17/1998
128	Ben Folds Five, Oscar De La Hoya, Korn	8/18/1998
129	Savage Garden, David Alan Grier	8/19/1998

=== Season 2 ===
Episode #	Featured celebrities	Original airdate
201	Shania Twain, Snoop Dogg	11/9/1998
202	Mariah Carey	11/16/1998
203	Cameron Diaz, Luke Perry	11/23/1998
204	Vince Vaughn, Rob Zombie	11/30/1998
205	Pamela Anderson, A Tribe Called Quest	12/7/1998
206	Whitney Houston, Cast of Dawson's Creek	12/14/1998

=== Season 3 ===
Episode #	Featured celebrities	Original airdate
301	The Search for Brandy's #1 Fan (Casting Special)	2/10/1999
302	Brandy, Brendan Fraser	2/17/1999
303	Monica, Sheryl Crow	2/24/1999
304	Celine Dion, TLC	3/3/1999
305	Celebrity Skin Special: Hole	3/10/1999
306	Sandra Bullock, Ben Affleck	3/17/1999
307	Garbage, Maxwell	3/24/1999
308	*NSYNC, Janeane Garofalo	4/5/1999
309	Method Man, David Arquette	4/5/1999
310	Marilyn Manson, Five	4/19/1999
311	David Spade, Sugar Ray	4/26/1999
312	Backstreet Boys, Britney Spears	5/12/1999
313	Jennifer Lopez, Ricky Martin	5/19/1999
314	Jackie Chan, Dru Hill	6/30/1999
315	Goo Goo Dolls, Ice Cube	7/7/1999
316	Faith Evans, Tori Amos	7/14/1999
317	Blackstreet, LeAnn Rimes	7/21/1999
318	Toni Braxton, Roy Jones Jr.	7/28/1999
319	Jennie Garth, Limp Bizkit	8/4/1999
320	Mýa, Mary J. Blige	8/11/1999

=== Season 4 ===
Episode #	Featured celebrities	Original airdate
401	Claire Danes, Jordan Knight	9/11/1999
402	Puff Daddy, Kid Rock	9/13/1999
403	George Clooney, Enrique Iglesias	10/1/1999
404	98 Degrees, Lil' Kim	10/22/1999
405	Heather Locklear, Eminem	10/15/1999
406	Joey McIntyre, Joseph Barahona, Red Hot Chili Peppers	10/4/1999
407	Courteney Cox Arquette, Foo Fighters	11/3/1999
408	Christina Ricci, Johnny Depp	11/16/1999

=== Season 5 ===
Episode #	Featured celebrities	Original airdate
501	Fanatic Live: Blink 182	2/25/2000
502	Madonna, Rupert Everett	3/3/2000
503	Christina Aguilera, Beck	3/10/2000
504	Mandy Moore, LFO	3/17/2000
505	Jessica Simpson, Carson Daly	3/31/2000
506	Cast of Felicity, Tyrese	4/7/2000
507	Sarah Michelle Gellar, Eve	4/17/2000
