= Peter Facinelli =

American actor and producer (born 1973)

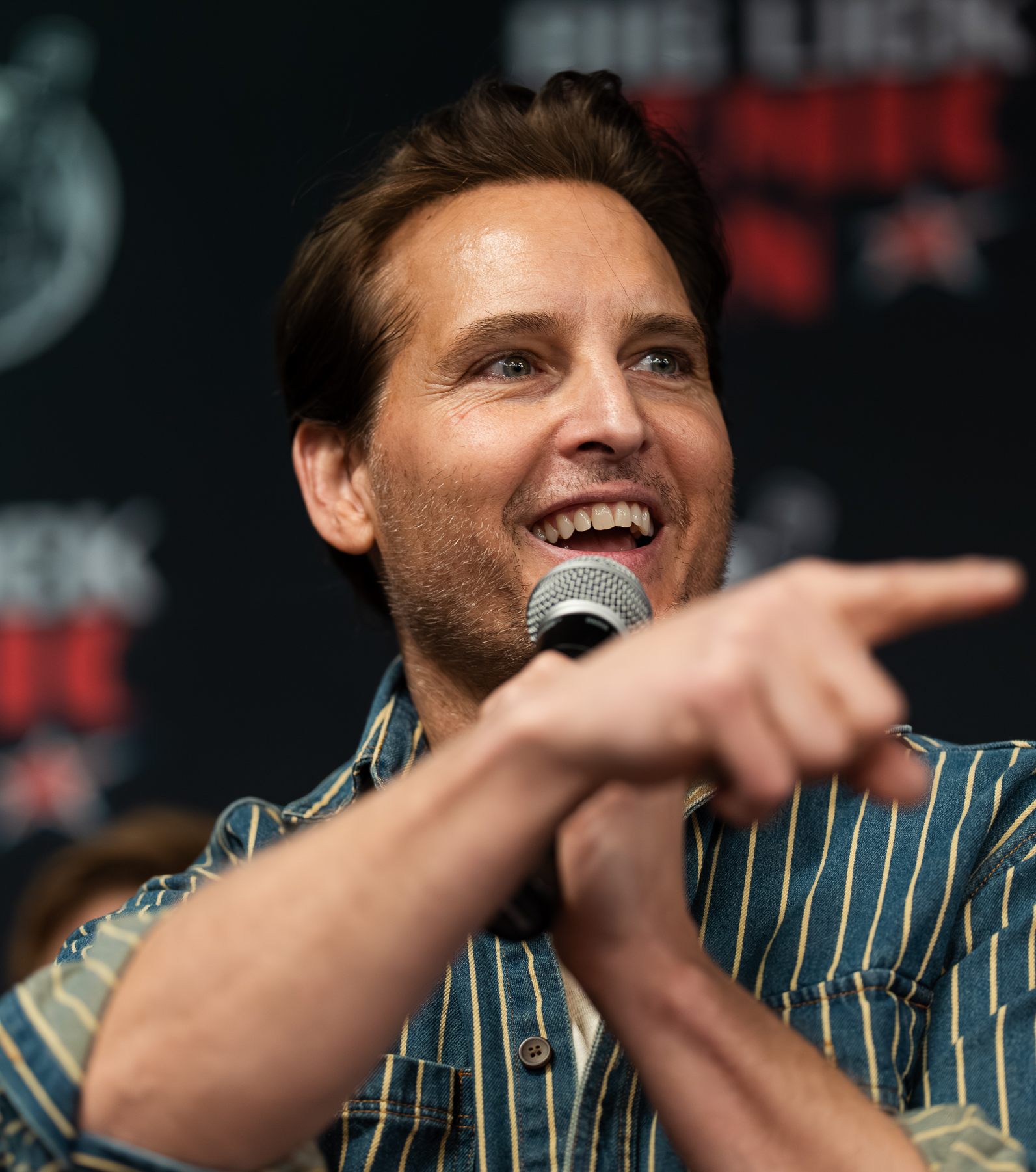
- Facinelli at Big Lick Comic Con in Roanoke, Virginia in 2026
- Born: November 26, 1973 (age 52); New York City, U.S.
- Citizenship: American; Italian
- Education: Tisch School of Arts
- Occupations: Actor, film producer
- Years active: 1995–present
- Spouse: Jennie Garth (m. 2001; div. 2013)
- Partners: Jaimie Alexander (2010–2016; engaged); Lily Anne Harrison (2016–present; engaged)
- Children: 4
- Relatives: Letizia Paternoster (niece)

Peter Facinelli (/ˌfætʃəˈnɛli/ FATCH-ə-NEL-ee; born November 26, 1973) is an American-Italian actor. He starred as Donovan "Van" Ray on the Fox series Fastlane from 2002 to 2003. He played Dr. Carlisle Cullen in the film adaptations of the Twilight novel series, and is also known for his role as Mike Dexter in the 1998 film Can't Hardly Wait. Facinelli was a regular on the Showtime comedy-drama series Nurse Jackie, portraying the role of Dr. Fitch "Coop" Cooper. He portrayed Maxwell Lord on the first season of the TV series Supergirl.

== Early life ==
Facinelli grew up in Ozone Park, Queens. He is the son of Italian immigrants Bruna (née Reich) and Pierino Facinelli. Bruna Facinelli is a homemaker, and Pierino Facinelli worked as a waiter. His parents come from the Val di Non valley in Trentino, northern Italy. His father is from Revò, while his mother is from Spormaggiore. His father worked multiple jobs to make ends meet and was often absent from the home. He was "around a lot of feminine energy" living with his mother, grandmother, and three sisters. He was raised Catholic and attended St. Francis Preparatory School in Fresh Meadows, New York.

Facinelli studied acting at New York University, as well as at the Atlantic Theater Company Acting School in New York City.

== Career ==
Facinelli made his feature film debut in Rebecca Miller's Angela in 1995 and came to the attention of critics in the TV-movie The Price of Love later that year. In 1996, Facinelli played opposite Jennie Garth, whom he later married, in An Unfinished Affair. Other TV roles followed, including a part in After Jimmy (1996) and a college dropout in Calm at Sunset. Facinelli co-starred with Amanda Peet and Michael Vartan in the 1997 AIDS-themed drama Touch Me (1997) and co-starred as a high school student in two 1998 features with Ethan Embry and Breckin Meyer, Dancer, Texas Pop. 81, and Can't Hardly Wait, which also starred Jennifer Love Hewitt.

Facinelli appeared in the sci-fi film Supernova starring James Spader in 2000. He made appearances in Riding in Cars with Boys in 2001 and The Scorpion King in 2002, followed by a leading role in the Fox drama Fastlane. Facinelli had a recurring role in the HBO series Six Feet Under in 2004 and a role in the FX original series Damages beginning in 2007. Facinelli starred in Hollow Man 2 with Christian Slater. It was released direct-to-video in May 2006.

In 2006, he was cast in Touch the Top of the World, a true story of Erik Weihenmayer, the first blind person to climb Mount Everest. The film is based on his best selling autobiography.

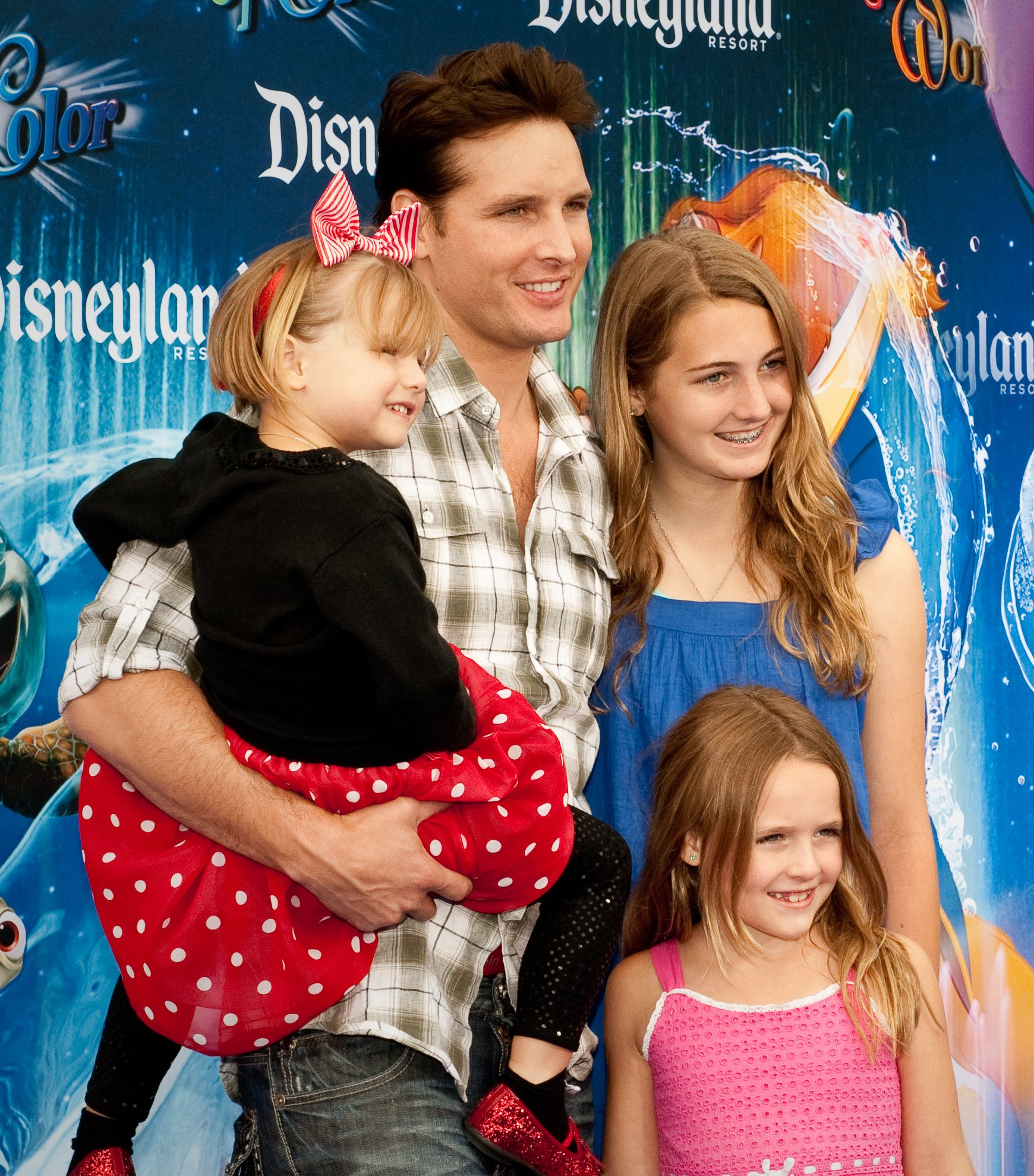
Facinelli with his daughters at the World of Color premiere at Disney California Adventure on June 10, 2010

After wrapping up Finding Amanda with Matthew Broderick, Facinelli played Carlisle Cullen in the film adaptation of Twilight, based on the book by Stephenie Meyer. According to an interview, "I almost didn't read for Twilight. My agent said, 'Do you want to do a vampire movie?' And I was like, 'No.' I was totally thinking blood and guts and bats in caves, like some kind of horror movie. They literally talked me into reading the book and I actually enjoyed the book a lot." Facinelli continued his portrayal in the sequels of the film, The Twilight Saga: New Moon, The Twilight Saga: Eclipse, The Twilight Saga: Breaking Dawn – Part 1, and The Twilight Saga: Breaking Dawn – Part 2.

He played Dr. Fitch Cooper for seven seasons on the Showtime dark comedy series Nurse Jackie.

He is the founder of the production company Facinelli Films. Their first feature film, Loosies, which was written entirely by Facinelli, was filmed in 2011. He starred in the film, which is a story of a New York pickpocket, directed by Michael Corrente. In 2011 he also wrote and produced the Hallmark Channel telefilm Accidentally in Love which starred his then-wife Jennie Garth.

In 2015, he played Maxwell Lord in Supergirl. The same year, he co-wrote the novel After the Red Rain with Barry Lyga and Robert DeFranco. It is set on a future Earth whose population is grappling with dwindling resources.

== Personal life ==
Facinelli met actress Jennie Garth on the set of An Unfinished Affair in 1995. Their first child, a daughter named Luca, was born in 1997. Facinelli and Garth married on January 20, 2001, in Montecito, California in a Catholic wedding where their 3-year-old daughter served as flower girl. They had two more daughters, born 2002 and 2006. In March 2012, Facinelli filed for divorce from Garth, which was finalized in June 2013. He later said he felt they had "an arranged marriage" and admitted, "I think if we didn't have children, I wouldn't have stayed."

Facinelli began dating actress Jaimie Alexander in 2010 after meeting on the set of Loosies. They became engaged in March 2015, and announced they had ended their engagement in February 2016.

On January 1, 2020, Facinelli became engaged to Lily Anne Harrison, whom he met on the Raya dating app. They have one child.

Facinelli is Catholic and is a supporter of LGBT rights. In 2009, Facinelli acquired Italian citizenship through jus sanguinis to shoot a film in Europe that required that all actors be European citizens. Cyclist Letizia Paternoster is Facinelli's niece.

== Filmography ==
=== Film ===
Year	Title	Role	Notes
1995	Angela	Lucifer	
1996	Foxfire	Ethan Bixby	
1997	Touch Me	Bail	
1998	Dancer, Texas Pop. 81	Terrell Lee Lusk	
1998	Can't Hardly Wait	Mike Dexter	
1998	Telling You	Phil Fazzulo	
1998	Welcome to Hollywood	Actor	
1999	The Big Kahuna	Bob Walker	
1999	Blue Ridge Fall	Danny Shepherd	
2000	Supernova	Karl Larson	
2000	Ropewalk	Charlie	
2000	Honest	Daniel Wheaton	
2001	Stealing Time	Alec Nichols	
2001	Tempted	Jimmy Mulate	
2001	Riding in Cars with Boys	Tommy Butcher	
2002	The Scorpion King	Takmet	
2005	Chloe	The boyfriend	Short film
2005	Enfants terribles	Curtis	
2006	The Lather Effect	Danny	
2006	Hollow Man 2	Detective Frank Turner	
2006	Arc	Paris Pritchert	
2007	Battle Olympia	Possessed office high jumper	Short film
2007	That Guy	Jack	Short film
2007	Lily	The man	Short film
2008	Finding Amanda	Greg	
2008	Twilight	Dr. Carlisle Cullen	
2008	Reaper	Jesus	Short film
2009	The Twilight Saga: New Moon	Dr. Carlisle Cullen	
2010	The Twilight Saga: Eclipse	Dr. Carlisle Cullen	
2011	The Twilight Saga: Breaking Dawn – Part 1	Dr. Carlisle Cullen	
2012	Loosies	Bobby Corelli	Also producer and writer
2012	The Twilight Saga: Breaking Dawn – Part 2	Dr. Carlisle Cullen	
2013	The Damned	David Reynolds	
2014	Freezer	Detective Sam Gurov	
2015	Walter	Jim	
2017	Heartthrob	Mr. Rickett	
2017	The Wilde Wedding	Ethan Darling	
2017	Gangster Land	George "Bugs" Moran	
2018	Asher	Uziel	
2019	Running with the Devil	Number One	
2019	Countdown	Dr. Sullivan	
2019	Famous Adjacent	Flanny	Short film, completed
2020	The Vanished – Hour of Lead	Deputy Rakes	Also director, producer, and writer
2020	The F**k-It List	Barry Brooks	
2021	The Ravine	Danny Turner	
2021	Catch the Bullet	Sheriff Drew Wilkins	
2021	13 Minutes	Brad	
2023	On Fire	Dave Laughlin	Co-Directed
2025	The Unbreakable Boy	Preacher Rick	
2025	Deadly Vows	Sam	
TBA	We Could Be Heroes †	—N/a	Filming

=== Television ===
Year	Title	Role	Notes
1995	Law & Order	Shane Sutter	Episode: "Performance"
1995	The Wright Verdicts	Vincent Costanza	Episode: "Sins of the Father"
1995	The Price of Love	Brett	Television film
1996	An Unfinished Affair	Rick Connor	Television film
1996	After Jimmy	James "Jimmy" Stapp	Television film
1996	Calm at Sunset	James Pfeiffer	Television film
2002–2003	Fastlane	Donovan "Van" Ray	Main role; 22 episodes
2002	I Love the '80s	Himself	Commentator
2004–2005	Six Feet Under	Jimmy	Recurring role; 9 episodes
2006	American Dad!	Miles	Episode: "Roger 'n' Me"; voice role
2006	Touch The Top of the World	Eric Weihenmayer	Television film
2007	Damages	Gregory Malina	Recurring role; 10 episodes
2007	Hannah Montana	Snowball	Episode: "Get Down Study-udy-udy"; voice role
2009–2015	Nurse Jackie	Dr. Fitch "Coop" Cooper	Main role (seasons 1–7); 73 episodes
2011	Accidentally in Love	N/A	Television film; producer and writer
2013–2014	Glee	Rupert Campion	Recurring role; 4 episodes
2015	American Odyssey	Peter Decker	Main role; 13 episodes
2015–2016	Supergirl	Maxwell Lord	Recurring role; 14 episodes
2017–2018	S.W.A.T.	Michael Plank	Recurring role; 7 episodes
2019	FBI	Michael Venutti	Episode: "Most Wanted"
2019	Escaping the NXIVM Cult: A Mother's Fight to Save Her Daughter	Keith Raniere	Television film
2019	Magnum P.I.	Gene Curtis / Ivan	Episode: "Day I Met the Devil"
2022	Roar	Second Husband	Episode: "The Woman Who Returned Her Husband"
