= Bill Dunn (announcer) =

Bill Dunn is an American salesperson and merchandiser who was a ring announcer for the World Wrestling Federation.

A native of Cape Girardeau, Missouri, Dunn earned a Bachelor of Arts in English from Southeast Missouri State University in 1985 and a Master of Arts degree from the same school in 1992. While working on his master's, Dunn was the assistant supervisor of the novelty division at the Show Me Center. During a WWF event at the arena, Dunn was encouraged to apply for a job with the company. He worked as a merchandiser for the WWF for nine and a half years and was a ring announcer for his final three with the company, most notably a features spot at WWF's Wrestlemania X. He was let go when the WWF downsized in 1997, and returned to Cape Girardeau, where he worked in sales. From 2000 to 2013 he was the sales manager for Rhea Optical Company. In 2002, he created The Old Town Cape Scholarship Garden, which grows vegetables for the weekly Cape Riverfront Market with the proceeds going to a Downtown Merchants Association scholarship to a student at Southeast Missouri State University. Since 2013, Dunn has worked as a bartender and bar manager in Cape Girardeau.
