= Andrea Bowen =

American actress (born 1990)

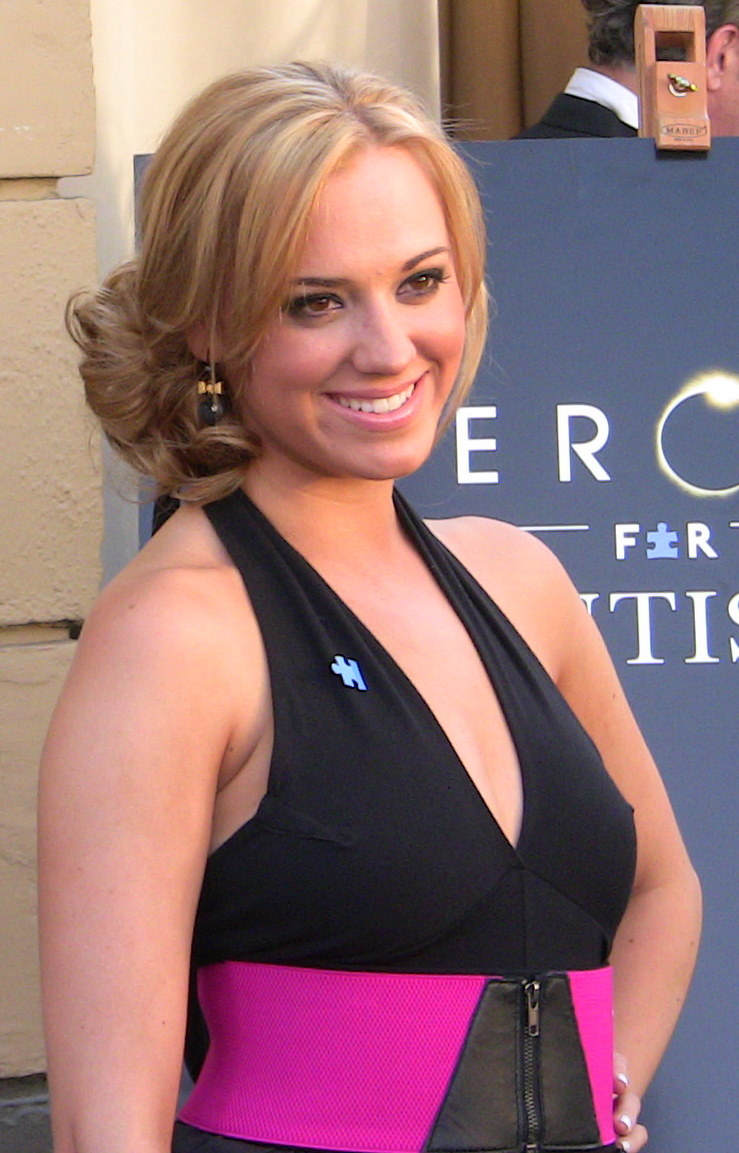
- Bowen in 2009
- Born: March 4, 1990 (age 36)
- Occupation: Actress
- Years active: 1996–present
- Spouse: Josh Zuckerman (m. 2024)
- Children: 1

Andrea Bowen (born March 4, 1990) is an American actress. She began her career appearing on Broadway musicals such as Les Misérables and The Sound of Music. In 2004, she began playing the role of Julie Mayer on the ABC comedy-drama series Desperate Housewives, a role she played on a regular basis until 2008. She later appeared on a recurring basis until the show ended in 2012. Bowen later went on to star in a number of Lifetime television films.

== Life and career ==
=== Early life ===
Bowen was born on March 4, 1990. Bowen is of Welsh, English, and German descent. She is the younger sister of Graham Bowen, Alex Bowen, Cameron Bowen, Jessica Bowen, and Jillian Bowen (who are also actors). Bowen briefly attended the Professional Performing Arts School in New York alongside best friend Sarah Hyland.

She made her Broadway debut in 1996 as Young Cosette/Young Éponine in Les Misérables. At six, she was the youngest actress ever to play the role. From 1996 to 2001 Bowen was a consistent presence on Broadway. She appeared in the original company of the 1998 revival of The Sound of Music as Marta von Trapp, and created the role of Adèle in the musical version of Jane Eyre in 2000. She returned to The Sound of Music in 2006 for the Hollywood Bowl production, this time playing Liesl. Bowen was also a member of The Broadway Kids concert group. Several of Bowen's siblings have also been heavily involved in musical theatre, performing roles in various other Broadway shows.

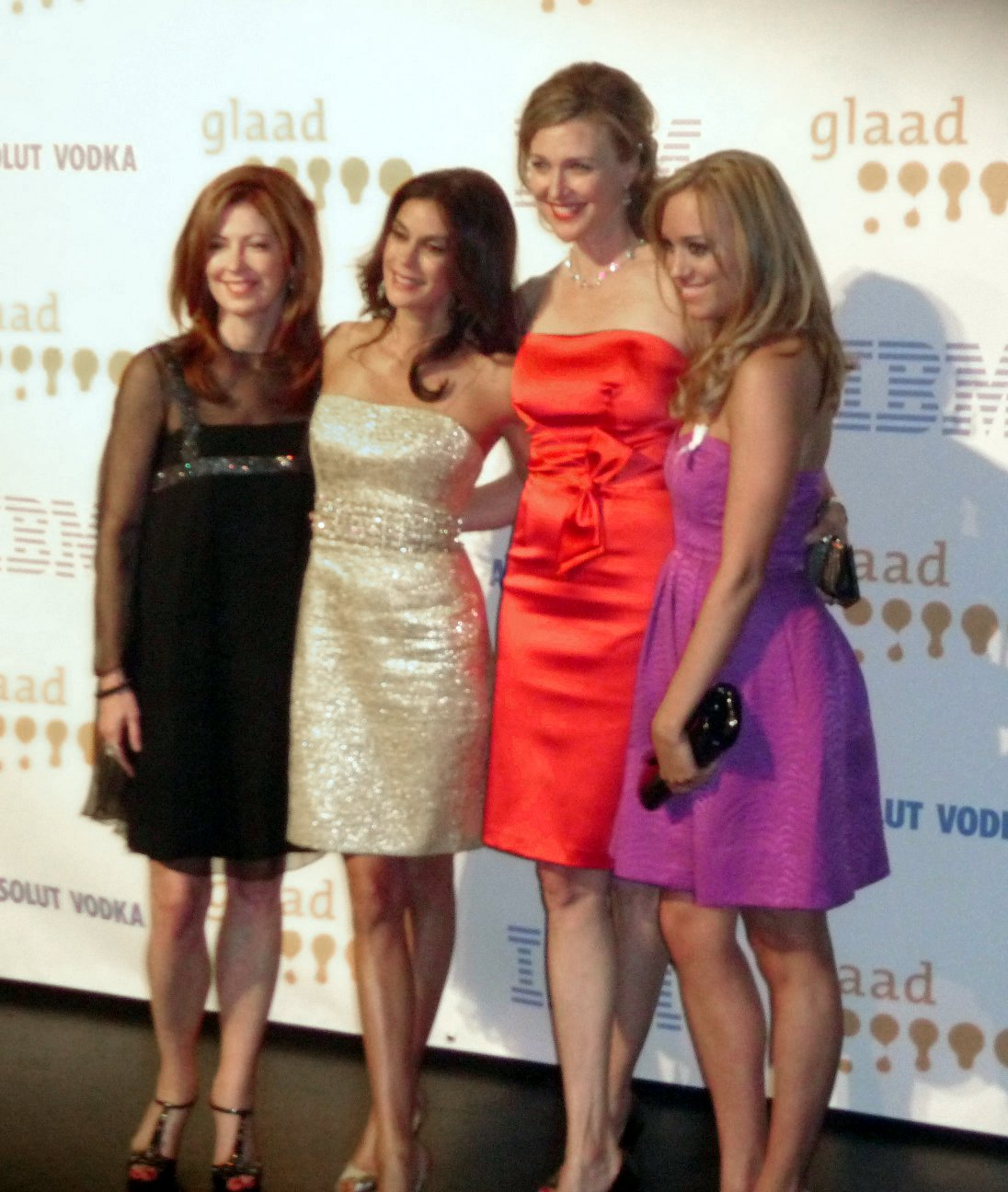
Bowen with Desperate Housewives co-stars Dana Delany, Teri Hatcher, and Brenda Strong at 2008 GLAAD Awards

Bowen has also had recurring or guest starring roles on such shows as One Tree Hill (with friend Sophia Bush), Boston Public and Law & Order: Special Victims Unit.

=== Desperate Housewives ===
From 2004 to 2012, Bowen portrayed Julie Mayer on Desperate Housewives. Prior to being cast in the role, Bowen did not think she would get it, explaining "they were looking for a 12-year-old brunette ... and I was a 13-year-old blonde." As a result, Bowen was asked to dye her hair for the role. Bowen was initially attracted to the series because of the amount of attention paid to the younger characters. She stated, "If you watch a lot of other television shows, the kids don't have that much [of a] part in it. On this show, the writers give us each our own individual storylines that have a lot of layers to them." For season three, the character's storylines began revolving around themes of teenage rebellion and angst. Bowen commented: "She's going to have, you know, primarily one love interest, and he's a bit of a bad boy. We're going to see if she has a positive effect on him, or if he has a negative effect on her. I'm definitely very excited about it ... because you kind of get to see a different side to her." Her character was written off the series after season four. Teri Hatcher expressed disappointment in the decision, but series creator Marc Cherry promised that Bowen would return to the series. Bowen returned to the series for one episode during season five and rejoined the main cast as a series regular for season six. She appeared once in season seven and returned for a string of episodes in the final season.

In the 2006 film Red Riding Hood, she appears as one of "The Three Ashleys". Also that year, she played the role of Candace in the esoteric adventure film Eye of the Dolphin. She also starred in the Lifetime Original film Girl, Positive, an experience that allowed her to help spread the message among youth that "HIV is something you can protect yourself from."

=== Later years ===
After leaving Desperate Housewives, Bowen guest starred on The Closer, Ghost Whisperer, Hawaii Five-0 and Scandal. She found work playing leading roles in a number of television films for Lifetime and Hallmark. Her films include After the Fall (2010), The Preacher's Daughter (2013), Zoe Gone (2014), Under Fire (2016), Pretty Little Addict (2016) and A Family for the Holidays (2017). In 2013, she went to star in a teen comedy film G.B.F..

As of August 29, 2024, Bowen is married to her Desperate Housewives co-star Josh Zuckerman.

== Filmography ==
=== Film ===
Year	Title	Role	Notes
1996	New York Crossing	Child	Television film
1997	Highball	Witch, Fairy	
2004	Luckey's Quarter	Patsy	Short film
2004	Party Wagon	Billie Bartley, Manifest Destiny (voice)	Television film
2006	Final Fantasy VII: Advent Children	Moogle Girl (voice)	English version
2006	Bambi II	Faline (voice)	Direct-to-video
2006	Red Riding Hood	Ashley #2	
2006	Eye of the Dolphin	Candace	
2007	Girl, Positive	Rachel Sandler	Television film
2010	After the Fall	Jenna Danville	Television film
2012	Twinkle Toes	Pretty Tall (voice)	Direct-to-video
2012	Divorce Invitation	Melanie	
2013	The Preacher's Daughter	Hannah White	Television film
2013	G.B.F.	'Shley	
2013	Percy Jackson: Sea of Monsters		Voice artist
2013	Stoker		Voice artist
2014	Zoe Gone	Tammy Roberts	
2016	Who Killed My Husband?	Sophie Howell	Television film
2016	Pretty Little Addict	Jennifer Philips	Television film
2017	Jonny's Sweet Revenge	Nikki	
2017	A Winter Wedding	Hailey Reynolds	
2020	Psycho Sister-In-Law	Haley Downes	Television film
2022	Half Pass Nightmare	Carrie Palmer	Television film

=== Television ===
Year	Title	Role	Notes
1996–1997	Law & Order	Rankin Toddler, Bess	2 episodes
2001	Law & Order: Special Victims Unit	Sophie Douglas	Episode: "Countdown"
2001	Third Watch	Rachel	Episode: "Adam 55-3"
2002	Arliss	Ginny	Episode: "In with the News"
2002	That Was Then	Zooey Glass	7 episodes
2003	Boston Public	Riley Ellis	3 episodes
2003	One Tree Hill	Stella	Episode: "With Arms Outstretched" (deleted scenes only)
2003	Strong Medicine	Sara Buck	Episode: "Seize the Day"
2004–2012	Desperate Housewives	Julie Mayer	Series Regular (season 1–4, 6); Guest Role (season 5, 7); Recurring Role (season 8); 95 episodes
2006–2007, 2009	King of the Hill	Sandy, Teen Girl (voice)	3 episodes
2005	Without a Trace	Becky Grolnick	Episode: "A Day in the Life"
2008	The Closer	Michelle Clark	Episode: "Cherry Bomb"
2009	Ghost Whisperer	Rebecca Kelly	Episode: "Greek Tragedy"
2010	Batman: The Brave and the Bold	Talia al Ghul (voice)	Episode: "Sidekicks Assemble!"
2011	Hawaii Five-0	Amy / Pauline Lucero	Episode: "Ho'ohuli Na'au"
2012	The Secret Life of the American Teenager	Jackie	Episode: "Allies"
2013	Scandal	Maybell Doyle	Episode: "Snake in the Garden"
2021	Station 19	Amy	Episode: "All I Want for Christmas Is You"

=== Video games ===
Year	Title	Role	Notes	Source
2000	The Longest Journey	Young April Ryan, Alatien Child	English version	
2003	The Cat in the Hat	Sally		
2008	Crisis Core: Final Fantasy VII	Aerith Gainsborough	English version	
2011	Dissidia 012 Final Fantasy	Aerith Gainsborough	English version	
2016	Final Fantasy Explorers	Aerith Gainsborough	English version; archival audio	
2019	Mobius Final Fantasy	Aerith Gainsborough	English version	
2020	Kingdom Hearts III Re Mind	Aerith Gainsborough	English version	

== Discography ==
- The Night of the Hunter, concept album
- The Sound of Music original Broadway revival cast recording, 1998
- Jane Eyre original Broadway cast recording, 2001
- Sugar Beats
- The Broadway Kids
- Preachers Daughter (2011)

== Awards ==
Bowen has 3 wins and 4 nominations

- 2005 Screen Actors Guild Award for * Outstanding Performance by an Ensemble in a Comedy Series (won)
- 2005 Young Artist Award for Best Leading Young Actress (nominated)
- 2006 Screen Actors Guild Award for Outstanding Performance by an Ensemble in a Comedy Series (won)
- 2007 Screen Actors Guild Award for Outstanding Performance by an Ensemble in a Comedy Series (nominated)
- 2008 Screen Actors Guild Award for Outstanding Performance by an Ensemble in a Comedy Series (nominated)
- 2008 Prism Award for Best TV Actress (won)
- 2009 Screen Actors Guild Award for Outstanding Performance by an Ensemble in a Comedy Series (nominated)
