= Push (professional wrestling) =

Professional wrestling term

In professional wrestling, a push is an attempt by the booker to make a wrestler win more matches and become more popular or more reviled with the fans depending on whether they are a heroic character ("face") or a villain ("heel"). A push may be accompanied by a turn or a change in the wrestler's gimmick. This is essentially the opposite of a burial, which in contrast to the high profile of a push is typically done with little or no fanfare. Sometimes the fans generate the push for a wrestler themselves when their approval for the wrestler's work generates a positive reaction from them that is not anticipated.

== History ==
In the Memphis territory, Nick Gulas began to push his son George to a main event spot despite having little in-ring experience and no athletic background. The fans quickly turned on him and the promotion; however, Gulas continued to push his son despite the negative backlash and financial losses. In the end, his insistence on keeping his son at the top of the card led to a hostile split of the territory. A push can also be attributed to a political shift in the promotion's offices. Bill Watts, whose professional wrestling promotions always consisted of an African-American main event heroic character, began pushing Ron Simmons, a midcarder, to main event status and eventually to the WCW World Heavyweight Championship upon being put in charge of World Championship Wrestling (WCW) at the same time he controversially pushed his son, Erik Watts, into the wrestling scene.

In WWE, following the fallout from the Signature Pharmacy scandal, smaller and less muscular wrestlers such as CM Punk and Jeff Hardy began to get pushed and Vince McMahon confirmed the paradigm shift by mentioning that fans are drawn by charisma and not size. When the company was being built around fan favorite John Cena, shedding his popular edgy freestyle and hip-hop-style rapping anti-establishment persona in favor of a more motivational "against all odds" one, was met with a negative reaction by the fans to the point where he became one of the most booed wrestlers in the promotion.
