= Beverly Hills, 90210 season 5 =

Beverly Hills, 90210
- Season 5
- DVD cover
- Starring: Jason Priestley Jennie Garth Ian Ziering Gabrielle Carteris Luke Perry Brian Austin Green Tori Spelling Mark Damon Espinoza Tiffani-Amber Thiessen Carol Potter James Eckhouse
- No. of episodes: 32

Release
- Original network: Fox
- Original release: September 7, 1994 – May 24, 1995

Season chronology
- ← Previous; Season 4 Next → Season 6

The fifth season of Beverly Hills, 90210, an American teen drama television series aired from September 7, 1994 on Fox and concluded on May 24, 1995 after 32 episodes.

The season aired Wednesday nights at 8/9c in the United States averaging 14.7 million viewers a week and was released on DVD in 2008.

This is the first season for Tiffani Amber Thiessen as Valerie Malone and the last season for Gabrielle Carteris, Mark Damon Espinoza, Carol Potter and James Eckhouse as series regulars.

== Overview ==
This season follows the gang during their sophomore year in college as they struggle with issues such as relationships, financial problems, dysfunctional families, parenthood, drug abuse, politics, injuries, self image, sexual assault, domestic violence, and cults. The West Bev group starts their sophomore year of college, but like always problems always arise before the school year begins. Dylan returns to his old habits after being duped out of all of his money, which may cost him his life. With Brenda in London, the Walshes welcome an old family friend from Buffalo, Valerie Malone, who is looking for a fresh start following a traumatic occurrence at home. Brandon and Kelly take their new relationship public, but when outside influences such as new responsibility, grooming, and old feelings begin to show, their new relationship is put in jeopardy.

== Cast ==
=== Starring ===
- Jason Priestley as Brandon Walsh
- Jennie Garth as Kelly Taylor
- Ian Ziering as Steve Sanders
- Gabrielle Carteris as Andrea Zuckerman-Vasquez
- Luke Perry as Dylan McKay
- Brian Austin Green as David Silver
- Tori Spelling as Donna Martin
- Mark Damon Espinoza as Jesse Vasquez
- Tiffani Thiessen as Valerie Malone
- Carol Potter as Cindy Walsh
- James Eckhouse as Jim Walsh

=== Recurring ===
- Joe E. Tata as Nat Bussichio
- Kathleen Robertson as Clare Arnold
- Jamie Walters as Ray Pruit
- Ann Gillespie as Jackie Taylor
- Matthew Laurance as Mel Silver
- Katherine Cannon as Felice Martin
- Michael Durrell as Dr. John Martin
- Christine Elise as Emily Valentine
- Nicholas Pryor as Chancellor Milton Arnold
- Denise Dowse as Vice Principal Yvonne Teasley
- Jed Allan as Rush Sanders
- Casper Van Dien as Griffin Stone
- Caroline McWilliams as LuAnn Pruit
- Stephanie Beacham as Iris McKay
- Wings Hauser as J. Jay Jones
- Jeffery King as Charley Rollins
- James C. Victor as Peter Tucker
- Alan Toy as Professor Patrick Finley
- Ryan Thomas Brown as Muntz
- Caroline Lagerfelt as Sheila Silver

== Episodes ==
No. overall	No. in season	Title	Directed by	Written by	Original release date	Prod. code	U.S. viewers (millions)
113	1	"What I Did on My Summer Vacation and Other Stories"	Michael Lange	Charles Rosin & Larry Mollin	September 7, 1994	2194110	21.2
After enjoying a successful summer in London, Brenda decides to stay in England and pursue her stage career. With her room vacant, the Walsh family agrees to take in Valerie Malone, the college-age daughter of a family friend who has committed suicide. Valerie appears charming and likable, but unknown to the group, she is actually cynical and manipulative... and plots to get involved with Steve for his money. Donna returns from her summer stay in Texas and claims that she's over with David, who's doing a video for his film class, with a little help from Nat, about his summer of working with Babyface, dating and being dumped by both a girlfriend and the tour, and having some good luck near the end of the season. The good news is that David is going to have a single dorm room and received a brand new car as a gift from his grandparents. But that evening, Donna has an emotional meltdown when she runs into David at a nightclub. Meanwhile, Dylan inconspiciously breezes back into town after an alcohol binge-filled summer in Mexico while he tries to process the loss of his entire fortune when his step-mother Suzanne and her boyfriend Kevin stole his money. Kelly and Brandon take their relationship public. Also, Jesse and Andrea take their premature baby daughter, Hannah, home from the hospital after Andrea details how her mother's intuition was the reason Hannah is still alive. Mark Damon Espinoza is added to the opening credits, along with Tiffani Thiessen, who joins the cast as Valerie Malone. The video for "Cantaloop (Flip Fantasia)" by Us3 plays over the closing credits to promote the 90210: The College Years soundtrack.
114	2	"Under the Influence"	Scott Paulin	Chip Johannessen	September 14, 1994	2194111	16.2
Brandon and Kelly continue to hide their relationship from Dylan, but the truth is always bound to come out somehow. Brandon decides to tell Dylan about him and Kelly, but chickens out when he sees Dylan drinking again and in a bad mood. At the same time, Dylan visits a bank and finally realizes that all of his bank accounts and entire financial base has been cleaned out by Kevin and Suzanne's scam, but being the person he is, Dylan keeps his financial crisis to himself. Meanwhile, Donna plans to take the semester off to participate in a debutante ball in Texas. Kelly however rightfully suspects that Donna is hiding behind her mother, Felice, in order to move away to avoid seeing David. As a result of being betrayed and scammed of all his money, Dylan begins giving everyone a hard time, but he crashes the debutante ball after being tipped off by Nat about Kelly and Brandon where he makes a scene. Dylan then goes to a nightclub where Jesse is working nights and asks for a drink, but Jesse turns him away. Dylan then meets a prostitute at the club and takes her home with him where Kelly, wanting to talk with Dylan, later walks in on them. The next morning, both Brandon and Donna confront Dylan about his actions and he seems to be listening to them, but ultimately decides to not return to college and pursues more self-destructive behavior. With Jesse working nights and studying in law classes during the day, Andrea tries to arrange more time to look after baby Hannah. Joshua Rifkind (Josh Richland) is now credited as Joshua Beckett. The video for Big Mountain's "Touch My Light" plays over the closing credits.
115	3	"A Clean Slate"	Bethany Rooney	Richard Gollance	September 21, 1994	2194112	17.9
Brandon accepts Josh Richland's decision to run for student government VP on a Richland-Walsh ticket... but a militant senior, named Alex Diaz, learns about a past story that Josh wrote about Brandon's tutoring of D'Shawn which threatens their campaign. But D'Shawn publicly stands up for Brandon's integrity and tells Alex he's just a racist, and on election night Brandon and Josh are nervous but hopeful--until Josh goes off for a drive that ends with his car being slammed into and his being killed, and a shell-shocked Brandon learning from Kelly that he and Josh won the election. Meanwhile, Valerie sets her devious sights on Dylan and digs her claws in successfully by hanging around the billiards club where Dylan hangs out, but he is later shocked to find she's the newest member of Casa Walsh. Also, Kelly and Donna ask Clare to move into the beachfront apartment as their new roommate, but Clare keeps them both awake at night with her snoring.
116	4	"Life After Death"	James Whitmore Jr.	Steve Wasserman & Jessica Klein	September 28, 1994	2194113	18.5
Brandon is left adrift and saddened as Josh's death hangs heavy on him. Alex Diaz tells Brandon he's contesting the election, using Josh's death as leverage to unseat Brandon in order to take the title of class president for himself, while Brandon is surprised and touched to learn Josh deeply admired him and resolves to fight for his office in Josh's memory. Meanwhile, Donna finally meets a man, a KEG frat member named Griffin Stone that her mother sets her up with, that makes her forget David, who meets Clare via their work for the CU TV station and begins dating her. Also, Valerie continues dating Steve while seeing Dylan behind everyone's back.
117	5	"Rave On"	David Semel	Larry Mollin	October 5, 1994	2194114	17.0
Where there's smoke, there's fire, in Kelly's opinion... at least where Valerie is concerned. Kelly begins to distrust Valerie when she smells Valerie smoking pot in Valerie's bedroom, but Kelly cannot convince anyone that the manipulative Valerie is bad news. Both Steve and Brandon refuse to believe Kelly, while Donna doesn't seem to care. Meanwhile, Steve organizes a two-night rave party at the Peach Pit. Valerie also begins to suspect the truth about Dylan's financial situation when she sees him pocketing money from the til at the Peach Pit. Meanwhile, Andrea heads out for a night on the town and spies Jesse flirting on the job; he later takes time off from work to set up a romantic dinner for them at home while their baby sleeps. While working on a video project with David and Clare, Donna meets a musician and carpenter named Ray Pruit. That evening, when Kelly begins following/stalking Valerie hoping to catch her at something to prove herself right, she finds Val at the Peach Pit drinking, smoking cigarettes, and flirting with Dylan in a back storage room. Kelly quickly tells Steve about it, but when they both confront Valerie, she spins it around by saying that Kelly misinterpreted what she saw, claiming that Dylan was making a pass at her. Steve believes Valerie, but Kelly rightfully doesn't. Later that night at the beachfront apartment, Kelly angrily tells Brandon all about what happened, explaining how Valerie so expertly lied to and fooled Steve and that she is fooling everyone else to the person she really is. Kelly also finally admits that she doesn't like or trust Valerie and never has, but Brandon continues to remain skeptical and casually advises Kelly to give Valerie the benefit of a doubt. At the end, the suspicious Valerie gets Dylan drunk at his home where he finally confesses to her that he is broke. Jamie Walters first appears as Ray Pruit, he would later be made a series regular.
118	6	"Homecoming"	Gilbert M. Shilton	Meredith Stiehm	October 12, 1994	2194115	18.0
The President of Selanesia, Fernando Quintero, visits California University to see his good friend Chancellor Arnold and receive cancer treatment, but his presence sets off a fierce debate among Brandon and key parts of the student body when it is revealed that he ordered the torture and execution of thousands of his own people and human rights activists want Brandon to serve Quintero with a subpoena in a case filed by a Selanesian man whose brother was killed by Quintero's security forces. Brandon ends up at odds with the Chancellor and Clare but ultimately does the right thing and is on good terms with Clare as well. Meanwhile, the KEG boys and Alpha girls plot to steal the mascot (a large stuffed brown bear) of a rival school before the upcoming Homecoming game where Valerie and Kelly team up with Steve, Griffin and Muntz in a successful operation involving laxative brownies. Andrea is lonely when Jesse is spending more time studying and bar tending than being with her. Andrea then meets a charming guy, named Peter, at a local laundromat. Elsewhere, Donna spends more time with Ray at his family's pumpkin stand. Also, Dylan forces Valerie to promise to keep his financial situation a secret because he doesn't want anyone feeling sorry for him, or having to think about how he was so easily scammed of all of his money. Later, Dylan cheats on Valerie with a prostitute just to see her get hurt like the same way he was privately hurt and humiliated when all his money was stolen.
119	7	"Who's Zoomin' Who?"	Gabrielle Beaumont	Karen Rosin	October 19, 1994	2194116	15.5
When the fire marshal shuts down the Peach Pit After Dark for violating capacity, Steve suggests to Dylan and Nat about purchasing the building next door to expand. Unfortunately, Dylan is broke and the only one who knows it is Valerie. The next day, when the Walshes and Valerie are planning a weekend trip to Palm Springs, a fax from Dylan's bank arrives requesting Jim's signature on a mortgage loan that Dylan has taken out, leaving them confused and speculating to what is going on with him (Brandon continues to mistakenly believe that Dylan is drinking again because of his recent breakup with Kelly). However, Valerie finally tells the Walshes that Dylan is broke from Kevin and Suzanne's business scam. Jim then informs Nat, and then privately apologizes to Dylan for what happened to him. Unfortunately, Dylan is mentally too far gone at this point and he responds by rudely insulting and tells off Jim who responds by saying he's done trying to help or talk to Dylan anymore. Meanwhile, Kelly disapproves when her mother, Jackie, tells her that she wants to return to modeling, but Kelly becomes further incensed when Jackie wants to include Kelly's baby sister Erin as well. That evening, David and Clare find themselves in a binding situation when David handcuffs himself to Clare's bed and gets stuck, and soon finds himself alone when Clare has to go out to dinner with her father. Donna continues to juggle dating both Griffin and Ray. But then Griffin takes Donna on a whirlwind trip to Catalina Island with the plans to seduce her, she refuses and finally learns what a creep Griffin really is. Valerie comes to Dylan's house to apologize over losing all his money and they end up sleeping together again. The next morning in the final scene, Steve and David (not yet aware that Dylan is broke) come over to Dylan's house to talk about the Peach Pit After Dark expansion and they both find Valerie in bed with Dylan. Steve draws the correct conclusion and responds by punching Dylan in the face. Gabrielle Carteris and Mark Damon Espinoza do not appear in this episode. The video for M People's "Moving on Up" plays over the closing credits.
120	8	"Things That Go Bang in the Night"	Jason Priestley	Chip Johannessen	October 26, 1994	2194117	18.4
On Halloween, now that all of Valerie's misdeeds and true persona are finally revealed, she seriously considers moving back to Buffalo, but is persuaded to stay by Brandon and his parents after learning that Valerie's mother has committed herself to a mental hospital after suffering a nervous breakdown due to the stress of Valerie's father's suicide. Steve unfairly blames Dylan for having a tryst with Valerie and ends all business he has with the Peach Pit and After Dark club. On the other hand, Kelly delights herself by telling everyone "I told you so" about Valerie. While Brandon and Cindy continue to be warm, friendly and supportive to Valerie, Jim, from this point onward, coldly avoids Valerie or openly treats her with suspicion - wondering if all of the bad and negative things that Kelly has been saying about Valerie might be true. Meanwhile, Dylan's anger and desperation over everyone being aware that he is broke becomes obvious to all when he further isolates himself from everyone he knows, and he later meets a drug dealer at his pool hall who introduces him to cocaine. Dylan later takes out his gun and shoots up his living room. At a fraternity costume party at the KEG house, Donna's two boyfriends, Griffin and Ray, finally meet face to face and almost have a fistfight, and Donna chooses to be with Ray. Elsewhere, Andrea gets upset when Jesse's aunt presents baby Hannah with a crucifix. Also, Clare talks David into tagging along with her for a UFO hunt for the night in the desert near Barstow that results in them finally consummating their relationship. After Valerie continues to sneak out to hang out with Dylan, she sees him high on cocaine. Valerie then tells Brandon who then confronts Dylan over his actions. The video for After 7's "Not Enough Hours in the Night" plays over the closing credits.
121	9	"Intervention"	Daniel Attias	Steve Wasserman & Jessica Klein	November 2, 1994	2194118	18.0
Dylan's closest friends (Brandon, David, Donna, Kelly, Andrea, Nat, Steve, and Jim and Cindy Walsh) stage an intervention at Casa Walsh, where they beg him to enter rehab. Valerie and Clare, left out of the intervention, spend the day shopping together. Dylan deflects or ignores all of the efforts to talk to him at the intervention, but he seems moved by Steve's continuing hostility towards him because Steve still unfairly blames Dylan for his tryst with Valerie (still refusing to believe anyone that it was really Valerie who orchestrated the tryst... which mirrors Dylan's own anger and denial to his current situation). After a long talk with his friends, Dylan agrees to go to a well-regarded rehab center. Meanwhile, Kelly's modeling career takes an upward turn when she is offered the chance millions of girls only dream about: the opportunity to appear on the cover of the national fashion magazine Seventeen. Dylan runs away from the rehab clinic after one day with a little of Valerie's help. Once back home at his house, Dylan begins to alienate Valerie too with his misanthropic, self-destructive attitude as well as his unwillingness to go after the people who stole all his money, which leads her to finally walk out on him. Dylan's problems increase when he is given heroin by his drug dealer. That evening, Ray has dinner with Donna's parents Felice and John. Also, Clare recruits David into making a video of them having sex, but the tape accidentally ends up at Donna's house (it was labeled as a TV station recording and Donna wants to show it to her parents). Fortunately for everyone, Dr. John Martin sees the tape first and saves Donna from more embarrassment by pretending the VCR is broken to Felice, and gives the VHS tape back to Donna with a grin and says "give my regards to David". At the end the next day, Dylan gets high while smoking heroin, and ends up driving his car off a cliff.
122	10	"The Dreams of Dylan McKay"	Scott Paulin	Charles Rosin	November 9, 1994	2194119	19.3
As Dylan lies in a coma fighting for his life at the hospital, he experiences a number of bizarre near-death dreams involving running down a pair of railroad tracks to a bright light while following the voice of Erica, as well as scenes involving his drug dealer, Kevin and Suzanne, and being stopped from "entering the light" by his dead father Jack. Meanwhile, Steve is annoyed when his overbearing father, Rush, insinuates himself into a KEG house flag-football game, but comes to find out Rush might have some good business ideas for the PPAD. Mark Damon Espinoza does not appear in this episode. The video for Jamie Walters' "Hold On," off his self-titled debut album, plays over the closing credits.
123	11	"Hate Is Just a Four-Letter Word"	Les Landau	Story by : Richard Gollance; Teleplay by : Charles Rosin	November 16, 1994	2194120	17.1
The campus erupts in controversy when an anti-Semitic African-American activist is asked to give a speaking engagement at the school. Despite advice from the Dean, Brandon finds himself caught in the middle of the chaos when his political choices come into direct conflict with his personal ethics. Andrea is opposed to the activist speaker, not least because she is spending more time with her Holocaust-surviving grandmother, and openly accuses Brandon of selling out his principles for politics. Meanwhile, Donna plans a birthday surprise for Ray on his 25th birthday, while David ponders his Jewish heritage in relation to the controversy. As Dylan recovers in the hospital, his estranged mother, Iris, keeps him company, but his drug dealer pays an unexpected visit and physically threatens Dylan (in his hospital bed) never to tell the police about him or their business. The video for Jade's "Every Day of the Week" plays over the closing credits.
124	12	"Rock of Ages"	David Semel	Larry Mollin	November 23, 1994	2194121	12.4
Brandon is forced to ask Jesse for help to defend his presidency when his political opponent, Alex Diaz, calls for a hearing to determine the validity of his position and Jesse comes up with a winning idea. Meanwhile, the entire gang goes to a Rolling Stones concert. Brandon takes Andrea to the concert after a brilliant legal move by Jesse saves his office at the hearing. Kelly gets backstage VIP access through the magazine, while Steve has trouble getting in at all after a hippie steals his wallet. Ray and Donna work as vendors and get to see the show free of charge. David and Clare go to the concert even though they claim to hate the group, but have to turn to a scalper when David's father doesn't show up with the tickets. Elsewhere, Dylan takes one step forward in his rehabilitation on his first day at the halfway house. Steve and his father force Dylan out of the Peach Pit After Dark. He agrees to sell his shares when Steve, Nat, and Willie (the cook) visit him in rehab. Dylan and Valerie agree to stop seeing each other, as he doesn't want to involve her in his problems anymore. During his first day in group therapy, Dylan has a confrontation with Charley, an older man and fellow addict who likes to bully other patients instead of dealing with his own problems. Afterword, Charley tells Dylan he was hard on him because he sees himself in the younger man, as Charley has repeatedly battled addiction and is at the point where he'll either succeed for good or end up failing and dying.
125	13	"Up in Flames"	Gilbert M. Shilton	Meredith Stiehm	November 30, 1994	2194122	17.0
Brandon's former girlfriend, Emily Valentine, flies back from Paris to attend a seminar at La Jolla University. She asks Brandon to meet her at the airport, claiming to have just a four-hour layover. She actually has a week until the beginning of her seminar, but Brandon breaks her heart by revealing that he is dating Kelly. Meanwhile, Steve and Griffin organize a holiday rave at an abandoned Hollywood house. Valerie helps them out in the hopes of getting back in Steve's good graces. David and Clare accidentally post the notice about the event on a computer bulletin board for lesbians, who constitute most of the guests. The house has very poor wiring and continually blows fuses. Griffin uses too much electricity by putting in more fuses, and the house catches on fire. Ray rescues Steve and Valerie, who were fooling around in one of the bedrooms. Griffin runs away unnoticed when the fire department and police show up to put out the fire, leaving behind Steve who has to explain to the officers at what he is doing there. Kelly and a girl named Allison are trapped in a downstairs bathroom with no means of escape. Mark Damon Espinoza does not appear in this episode.
126	14	"Injustice for All"	Michael Lange	Karen Rosin	December 14, 1994	2194123	16.9
In the aftermath of the house fire, Kelly suffers second and third degree burns on right arm, wrist, ear, and the whole right side of her neck and back. Allison's injuries are much more severe, but she maintains a positive attitude. While Kelly recovers at the beachfront apartment tended by her mother Jackie, Brandon is racked with guilt because of his feelings for Emily and that he was not there for Kelly. Kelly does not react well when she learns that Emily is still in town. But after speaking to Dylan over the phone at the halfway house and meeting Emily herself, Kelly learns that Brandon still loves her. Meanwhile, Steve also feels very guilty for the house fire and calls upon his lawyer father, Rush, to help out after Griffin abandons him. When Griffin is found by the police hiding out at his parents house and brought in, Steve learns, to his bewilderment, that the police intend to charge both he and Griffin with multiple felonies which include disturbing the peace, criminal trespassing, reckless endangerment, holding an illegal rave, arson, damage to private property, two counts of attempted manslaughter of Kelly and Allison, etc. Due to Steve's legal troubles, Valerie quickly distances herself from him which leads Steve to finally realize that Valerie really is a bad person who was only interested in him for his money. Griffin's father hires a professional attorney for Steve and Griffin where Rush, after looking over the case from behind closed doors with the lawyer, advises both of them to plead no contest to one count of disturbing the peace in order so the other charges can be dropped and to avoid jail time. At their arraignment, Steve and Griffin follow Rush's advice and they both receive two years of probation, a $1,000 fine and 100 hours of community service... and they are also both forbidden from organizing, promoting and attending dance clubs, raves or parties for two years... thus destroying Steve's future plans and career as a party promoter. Steve is furious to learn of this provision that Rush arranged with the judge, but Steve is more shocked and angry minutes outside the courtroom during a heated argument with Rush when he discovers the truth behind all of this: Griffin had actually stole the keys to the Hollywood house from his father's real estate office instead of asking for permission to use it for the rave (Griffin lied to Steve about obtaining permission). Afterwards at the KEG house, Steve privately confronts Griffin in his room over the house key theft and the events from that night... leading up to the fact that Griffin inadvertently started the fire that put Kelly and the other girl in the hospital. When the smarmy Griffin shows no guilt or remorse over the fire or any of his own admitted actions, the enraged Steve physically assaults Griffin and orders him to move out of the KEG house and leave the fraternity immediately, as well as never talk to him again; Griffin reluctantly complies. Elsewhere, Ray's perpetual bad mood confuses Donna. He explains that his alcoholic mother always begins drinking around the holidays, because his equally drunkard father left her on Christmas day over 20 years ago after pushing her down a flight of stairs and causing her to have a miscarriage. Elsewhere, Andrea and Jesse throw a party for Hannah's first Hanukkah. Jesse obtains work as an attorney for those who cannot afford representation and takes his very first court case involving child abuse. Later, Jesse's confidence turns into anger and frustration after the end result of his case (not shown on camera), which is the court's harsh and unfair treatment of his client; a widowed Mexican immigrant father whose two children are taken away by Social Services after a babysitter neglects them. Jesse's angry and unhappy story about the case and lesson about injustice to Steve leads Steve to do a good deed. At the end, Dylan comes home from rehab and is greeted by a letter from a stranger in Michigan who found Erica's note in the LAX ladies room (from Season 4) pleading for his help; the note reads: "Dylan... Kevin and my mother are taking me to Brazil. Help me! Erica".
127	15	"Christmas Comes This Time Each Year"	Richard Lang	Story by : Steve Wasserman & Jessica Klein; Teleplay by : Max Eisenberg	December 21, 1994	2194124	15.6
On Christmas Eve, Felice interferes in Donna and Ray's relationship by offering him a bribe to stop seeing her. Ray's alcoholic, chain-smoking mother, LuAnn, goes Christmas shopping with Donna. Differing family traditions cause tension between the Catholic Jesse and the Jewish Andrea. Clare introduces David to her father during a faculty Christmas party who finds common ground with him over their love of music and playing the piano. Meanwhile, Dylan manages to track down and get in contact with his father's former fiancée and FBI handler, Christine Pettit, to help him find his stolen money, but Christine tells Dylan that the agency cannot help. Dejected, Dylan spends Christmas Eve alone and sober at his house watching Christmas themed movies on his TV set and thinks back to the time when Suzanne and Erica first came into his life one year earlier (from Season 4). The next morning on Christmas, Dylan gets an oddball visitor when an older man shows up at his house, introducing himself as Jay J. Jones (nicknamed 'Jonsey') (guest star Wings Hauser), who claims to be his "Christmas present" from Christine Pettit. Jones is an alcoholic ex-FBI agent and Christine's former partner in the agency who currently works as a freelance bounty hunter, mercenary, private investigator, and assassin-for-hire who was contacted by Christine about the situation and offers to help Dylan track down the people who stole his money in exchange for getting half of it. Dylan reluctantly agrees to the deal. Elsewhere, Brandon is left alone to care for the recovering Kelly when Jim and Cindy leave town to visit Brenda in England and Valerie leaves to visit her mother in Buffalo. Kelly worries about Brandon finding her unattractive due to her fire burn scars. Also, Nat hosts a special feed-the-homeless dinner at the Peach Pit.
128	16	"Sentenced to Life"	Jack Bender	Story by : Ian Ziering and Steve Wasserman & Jessica Klein; Teleplay by : Steve Wasserman & Jessica Klein	January 4, 1995	2194125	17.7
While working off his community service at a Hollywood retirement home, Steve spots a former stage and screen actor who had once appeared on "The Hartley House" named Saul Howard (guest star Milton Berle), a victim of Alzheimer's Disease, whose life story inspires Steve to make the most of his own. Meanwhile, Ray is offered the chance to perform on stage at the opening of the new Peach Pit After Dark nightclub. Also, Kelly's personal hostility toward Valerie escalates when she learns that Valerie spent Christmas in the Caribbean instead of visiting her family. When Kelly oversleeps one day and misses an important class, Valerie covers for her and Kelly half-heartedly thanks her. Elsewhere, Andrea is interning at a local hospital where she meets her mysterious laundromat guy, who introduces himself as Peter Tucker before he later takes care of a feverish Hannah and confronts Andrea about their similar life stories. For his work in this episode, Milton Berle was nominated for an Emmy as Outstanding Guest Actor in a Dramatic Series. The video for Stacey Piersa's "Not One More Time" plays over the closing credits.
129	17	"Sweating it Out"	Jason Priestley	Chip Johannessen	January 11, 1995	2194126	15.3
A motorcycle road trip inadvertently leads Brandon and Dylan to an ancient Native American ceremony where the two friends learn valuable lessons when they are arrested and subjected to community service (building a sweat lodge, which they then are invited to and do sit inside) for trespassing on a local reservation which helps reduce the tension between them. Meanwhile, Valerie becomes interested in Ray and sets her sights to bag him behind Donna's back as she continues to help him overcome his stage fright on the eve of the opening of the new Peach Pit After Dark club. Kelly benefits from attending a psychology workshop seminar run by a famous, crippled psychology professor named Patrick Finley. Also, Steve finally makes up with his father Rush. At the end, when Dylan returns home, Jonesy has a message for him from overseas: he's located Dylan's missing cash and sister.
130	18	"Hazardous to Your Health"	James Whitmore Jr.	Larry Mollin	January 18, 1995	2194127	16.5
Dylan, and later Valerie, fly to the coastal resort city of Punta Brava, Mexico where they team up with Dylan's PI, Jay J. Jones, where they hope to plan and execute a complex caper to rescue Erica and reclaim Dylan's inheritance from Kevin and Suzanne whom are hiding out down there. Jonesy and Valerie impersonate a tourist criminal couple on vacation where they pretend to run into Kevin and Suzanne (who are living there under their new aliases of Karl and Kitty Cavendish), in order to get the password for Kevin's offshore bank account where he is laundering Dylan's $7.7 million. However, Dylan is left on his own to rescue Erica when Jonesy says that their successful retrieval of the money means the job is over, before some heroics lead to Kevin and Suzanne getting their just deserts and Dylan giving his sister a hug. Back in California, Kelly becomes more deeply involved with Professor Finley's organization, leading to a rift in her relationship with Brandon who begins to distrust the egotistical professor. Mark Damon Espinoza does not appear in this episode.
131	19	"Little Monsters"	James Eckhouse	Meredith Stiehm	February 1, 1995	2194128	16.0
Kelly distances herself from everyone that matters to her as Finley's charismatic hold on her grows stronger as he fights with Brandon and the college council to preserve his tenure. Meanwhile, the home-wrecking Ariel (guest star Kari Wuhrer) is back into Donna's life when she offers Ray a record deal. Also, the greedy Valerie seeks a reward for helping Dylan recover his stolen money and after receiving $10,000 from Dylan, she asks Jones for a much larger cut. Elsewhere, Andrea flirts with trouble when she starts having an affair with Peter while Jesse is away on business.
132	20	"You Gotta Have Heart"	Gilbert M. Shilton	Max Eisenberg	February 8, 1995	2194129	15.3
Brandon has the whole gang partake with him in a Valentine's Day call-in telethon that is held at the Peach Pit After Dark. Valerie moves out of the Walshes' and into a fancy hotel suite for herself. Brandon and Kelly's relationship troubles come to a head at Finley's new headquarters, and a heartbroken Brandon turns to an unlikely source for help. Meanwhile, when Donna refuses to sleep with Ray, his pent-up frustration inadvertently leads him to Valerie's hotel room. Ray's mother, LuAnn, figures out that he cheated on Donna, but covers for him. Also, Andrea and Jesse have a run-in with Peter and his wife. Elsewhere, Steve tries to secure the R&B group "Jade" for the Valentine's Day telethon at the Peach Pit After Dark. This episode features a special appearance by Jade, as well as a cameo by Aaron Spelling.
133	21	"Stormy Weather"	Bethany Rooney	Story by : Larry Mollin; Teleplay by : Lana Freistat Melman	February 15, 1995	2194130	15.8
Brandon seeks Dylan's help with both taking down Professor Finley's cult-like organization and reuniting with his girlfriend, but when it comes to Kelly all bets are off. Brandon then tries to talk with Chancellor Arnold to help him look for a former Finley cult follower to help before both Kelly and Dylan fall under Finley's power. Also, Ray tries to cut ties with Valerie who threatens to tell Donna about their sexual trysts. Ian Ziering, Brian Austin Green, James Eckhouse and Carol Potter do not appear in this episode.
134	22	"Alone at the Top"	Victor Lobl	Steve Wasserman & Jessica Klein	February 22, 1995	2194131	16.6
As the new owner of the After Dark, Valerie uses her newfound leverage to force Ray to continue their secret affair. But Ray has never been one to follow orders which makes him leave town. Meanwhile, a campus rape causes mass panic on campus leaving Brandon at a loss over what to do, where the focus lands on a friend of David's, named Lenny, who is a former soldier who served time for sexual assault. Dylan is temped by Valerie to fall off the wagon by drinking and smoking pot, but rather than doing so, Dylan instead tracks down and meets his former halfway house roommate, Charley Rollins, a local motel owner, where Dylan asks for his help to find his own path with life. Also, Peter temps Andrea to work late at the hospital as an excuse to continue their secret tryst.
135	23	"Love Hurts"	Gilbert M. Shilton	Story by : Larry Mollin; Teleplay by : Ken Stringer	March 1, 1995	2194132	15.5
The campus is in an uproar when an alleged rapist is released from custody. Despite his alibi, the students are sure that Lenny is responsible for the string of crimes on campus. And while everyone is fixated on Lenny, the real rapist is in the perfect position to strike again when he targets Donna and holds her hostage at her beach apartment, where quick thinking from David and pure rage from Donna save her from a terrible fate. Meanwhile, Valerie manipulates Donna and everyone into believing that David is the one responsible for Ray's departure from Los Angeles. Steve tries to secure the rock group, the Flaming Lips, as the new band for the After Dark. Also, Dylan finds out about Andrea's extramarital affair with Peter when he sees them together at Charley's motel while he and Charley are working on a movie script. Later, when Andrea offers to leave Jesse to be with Peter, he refuses to leave his wife and as a result, Andrea angrily breaks up with him. Jennie Garth and James Eckhouse do not appear in this episode. Garth had a real-life dental emergency that required surgery, this is referenced in the next episode when Kelly mentions that she is feeling "much better". The video for "She Don't Use Jelly" by The Flaming Lips plays over the closing credits.
136	24	"Unreal World"	David Semel	Story by : Larry Mollin; Teleplay by : Meredith Stiehm	March 15, 1995	2194133	15.9
Brandon, Kelly, Donna, and Steve appear in Clare and David's cinema verité project: a The Real World-style documentary which soon reveals intimate secrets about the gang and threatens to tear apart some long-standing couples. Valerie moves back in with the Walshes after being evicted from her hotel suite. Meanwhile, Dylan helps more with Charley's movie screenplay and more help comes from Valerie who repeatedly temps Dylan. Elsewhere, Jesse makes a confession to Andrea about being unfaithful just when she is about to admit the same.
137	25	"Double Jeopardy"	Richard Lang	Christine Elise McCarthy & Sam Sarkar	March 29, 1995	2194134	14.8
Brandon, Clare and Andrea vie for a spot on College Jeopardy! but only one can win. Meanwhile, Jesse moves out of his and Andrea's apartment and in with Dylan. The reconciliation of Mel and Jackie gives David hope of reuniting with Donna whom he still has feelings for.
138	26	"A Song for My Mother"	Chip Chalmers	Max Eisenberg	April 5, 1995	2194135	14.5
Ray is happy that Donna has come to Portland, Oregon, to visit him but annoyed (though silently) at David who is tagging along to visit his estranged mother. David panics when he discovers that his mother was fired, no longer lives at her last known address, and hasn't cashed her alimony checks for months. He turns to Donna for help, and Ray behaves like a total jerk. David and Donna cannot find Sheila at any of her favorite hangouts and learn that she was recently arrested. Donna misses Ray's concert; he explodes and shoves her against a wall in their hotel room. He later feels guilty and loans David his truck. Mel flies in from Los Angeles and tells David that Sheila has a life-long history of mental illness (she was diagnosed at a young age as a manic depressive and had a nervous breakdown after her divorce from Mel). They receive a tip that she is living on the streets and are able to find her and bring her to the hospital. David realizes that Donna is happy with Ray and decides to back off. Back in California, Dylan explores hypnotherapy in the hopes of understanding the main character in Charley's script. Also, Valerie gets a tattoo. Jason Priestley, Jennie Garth, Ian Ziering, Gabrielle Carteris, Mark Damon Espinoza, Carol Potter and James Eckhouse do not appear in this episode.
139	27	"Squash It"	Les Landau	Story by : Larry Mollin; Teleplay by : Phil Savath	April 12, 1995	2194136	13.3
Steve and David organize a hip-hop night at the After Dark club to boost the sagging gate receipts. David asks Willie's nephew Juwan, a talented DJ, to join him onstage. Steve backs out of the event because he is nervous about Juwan's criminal record. Valerie tries to dodge a grimy Australian metal band that claims to have been booked (because she doesn't have the money to pay them for performing due to mismanagement on her part). Although his tour is ending, Ray is unsure about returning to Los Angeles. Valerie goes to Reno to re-hire him, and claims to have changed her ways. While Valerie is gone, the Aussies crash the hip-hop night and trash the After Dark. Juwan and his friends are prepared to fight them but decide to keep their cool. David and Clare get back together. Dylan allows his therapist, Molly, to hypnotize him and regresses to a past life as a hobo. Meanwhile, Chancellor Arnold asks Brandon to keep an eye on a bratty and unruly 12-year-old genius named Warren, who may apply to C.U. but whose disrespectful behavior leads Brandon to chew him out and later have a discussion where Warren reveals he doesn't want to go to college just yet. Mark Damon Espinoza does not appear in this episode.
140	28	"Girls on the Side"	Victor Lobl	Meredith Stiehm	May 3, 1995	2194137	11.4
Kelly becomes depressed after making the cover of Seventeen, as she fears that she will never regain her past looks. Steve and Jackie try to convince her to continue her modeling career. Kelly has a chance meeting with Allison's girlfriend Dana, who gives her the brush-off. Kelly tries to visit Allison at the burn center, but she refuses to see her. Kelly talks to Dana's new girlfriend, who reveals that Allison dumped Dana because she is in love with Kelly. Allison calls Kelly and asks to see her after she is released from the hospital. Meanwhile, Ray returns to town to play at the After Dark, but his alcoholic mother, LuAnn, gets drunk before his first performance. David and Clare take her home, and she babbles about Ray's affair with Valerie. David and Clare confront them (Ray confesses to David, who tells him that he won't tell Donna himself unless he does it again but will keep an eye on him, while Valerie lies about it to a disgusted Clare), but decide not to tell Donna to avoid hurting her feelings. Elsewhere, Charley grows tired of seeing Dylan moon over Kelly; he encourages him to make a move. Also, Jesse is offered a clerkship in Boise, Idaho. Andrea offers her support, although she is less than thrilled by the move. Jesse turns down the offer because he doesn't want to force Andrea to give up her dreams of medical school.
141	29	"The Real McCoy"	Jason Priestley	Story by : Charles Rosin & Larry Mollin; Teleplay by : Charles Rosin	May 10, 1995	2194138	11.4
While under hypnosis, Dylan recalls a past life as a gunslinger in the Wild West. He recognizes Kelly as the woman who convinced him to change his ways and become a family man. He later helped rescue a past love from hanging and was gunned down by the son of one of his victims. Dylan concludes that Kelly is his soulmate. He shows up on her doorstep when she returns from a trip to New York, and they share a passionate kiss. Meanwhile, Donna tries to arrange a double-date between herself and Ray along with David and Clare, who lie their way out of any plans and let Ray know they'll keep quiet about his cheating but they won't pretend that they like him. Brandon seeks re-election and is virtually unopposed. When the board of education mandates a huge tuition hike, Brandon is suddenly criticized for failing to look out for the students' interests. Alex Diaz enters the race for student body president as a write-in candidate and wins easily. Valerie concludes that Brandon is her perfect guy and now sets her sights on him. Jim fears that his job is in jeopardy when his bosses hold meetings behind his back. Jesse is offered a teaching job at the Yale Law School, but will only accept if Andrea's scholarship is reinstated, and an overjoyed Andrea hugs him happily.
142	30	"Hello Life, Goodbye Beverly Hills"	James Whitmore Jr.	Steve Wasserman & Jessica Klein	May 17, 1995	2194139	13.6
Dylan asks Kelly to join him on a trip around the world. Valerie sees the tickets in Kelly's room and tells Brandon. Brandon counters with a marriage proposal, and Kelly asks for time to think things over. She eventually rejects both men and proclaims, "I choose me." Andrea and Jesse prepare for their move to Connecticut. The gang surprises her by organizing a picnic lunch at West Beverly High (although Brandon and Dylan, still waiting for Kelly's decision, opt not to attend). Everyone meets Andrea and Jesse at the Peach Pit one last time to say goodbye. Meanwhile, Ray lashes out at Donna for devoting time to her friends and studying for finals. He drags her away from Andrea's picnic and verbally berates her, and Donna has a talk with Kelly about the difficulties of relationships. Jim finds out that his company wasn't looking to fire him but were preparing an offer of a promotion and substantial raise--if he agrees to move to Hong Kong and take over their new office there. He and Cindy decide to go through with the move. This is the final episode for Gabrielle Carteris and Mark Damon Espinoza as series regulars, although they were still included in the credits for the season finale. Carteris returns later in guest appearances.
143	31	"P.S. I Love You"	Victor Lobl	Larry Mollin & Chip Johannessen	May 24, 1995	2194140A	17.1
144	32	"P.S. I Love You"	Victor Lobl	Larry Mollin & Chip Johannessen	May 24, 1995	2194140B	17.1
Jim and Cindy leave for Hong Kong. Kelly wants to continue her relationship with Brandon, but he cannot get over the rejected marriage proposal. Steve and Donna head to Palm Springs for an Alpha/ΚΕΓ convention. A contrite Ray agrees to accompany Donna, who is making a speech at the event. He quickly becomes angry and possessive. Rush tries to set up Steve with a business associate's daughter. Steve is more interested in the Cadillac-driving "goddess" named Elle (guest star Monika Schnarre) he keeps encountering. Brandon and Valerie decide to head to Palm Springs to avoid the caravan of potential buyers who have overrun the house. Brandon goes on a drinking binge and finds himself tempted by Valerie. He has several hallucinations in which his parents appear and express their disappointment before he tells them off for abandoning him. Kelly postpones her trip to the convention to spend the day with Allison but is very secretive. David and Clare see them together and get the wrong idea. Allison admits her love for Kelly, who politely confirms that she's straight and not interested. Meanwhile, Dylan's plans to visit his mother Iris and half-sister Erica in Hawaii are nixed when Charley finds an investor for the movie who also resides in Palm Springs. After driving to Palm Springs, Dylan is wary after learning that the man, Tom Rose (guest star James Handy), is a mobster who tries to intimidate Charley and Dylan to cast his much younger, dim-witted, and talent-less mistress as the lead. Dylan eventually finds out during a dinner at Mr. Rose's house that Tom Rose is connected to Jack McKay's death. David tells Brandon about Kelly and Allison, and Brandon humiliates Kelly with his drunken ramblings. Brandon plans to give in to Valerie. But that night, the police pull over Brandon and arrest him when a joint is found in Valerie's car. He is released the next morning but rejects Valerie for getting him in trouble, during which she shows more concern for her impounded car than Brandon. He clears the air with Kelly before heading home and refuses another reconciliation attempt. After learning that Tom Rose used to know his father, Dylan tries to contact Christine Pettit for information, but Mr. Rose overhears and traces the phone call. The next morning, Tom Rose takes Dylan up in a tramcar on the Palm Springs Aerial Tramway, where his goons hold him over the edge. Mr. Rose tells Dylan that he had nothing to do with Jack McKay's murder, yet he claims that he does know the identity of Jack's killer... but he will only tell Dylan if Dylan is willing to die for the information, which he is not. After being released, Dylan backs out of the movie deal and ends all of his business with Charley. Dylan and Brandon end up sharing a bus ride back to Beverly Hills. When Dylan gets home and after listening to a message from Christine Pettit on his answering machine warning him to stay away from Tom Rose and not to investigate Jack McKay's murder, he gets his gun out of storage and quietly vows to track down and kill his father's murderer. Elsewhere, Ray becomes physical with Donna during an argument and knocks her down the stairs. She suffers an arm injury and is unnerved when her mother suddenly gives Ray her approval. Valerie tells Donna that she saw Ray push her, but Donna denies it and lashes out at Valerie, aware that she and Ray have been seeing each other. Also, Steve discovers the truth about his "goddess." At the end, Brandon learns that his parents house has been sold, and he must move out in two weeks. He and Valerie end up making out. This episode features a special appearance by Dick Dale and the Del-Tones, and is the final episode for James Eckhouse and Carol Potter as series regulars.

== Soundtrack ==
Beverly Hills, 90210: The College Years was released as season five was airing, with several songs from it featured in the show's closing credits.

== Ratings ==
Season	Timeslot	Season premiere	Season finale	TV season	Rank	Viewers (in millions)
5th	Wednesday 8/9C	September 7, 1994	May 24, 1995	1994–1995	#46	14.7

== Home media ==
The DVD release of season five was released in Regions 1, 2 and 4. Unlike other season releases, it has no special features. The season is also available on CBS All Access, however, episodes 12, 20 and 25 are missing due to copyright permissions.

The Fifth Season
Set details		Special features
32 episodes; 1370 minutes (Region 1); 1370 minutes (Region 2); 8-disc set; 1.33:1 aspect ratio; Languages: English (Dolby Digital 2.0 Surround); Subtitles: English, Dutch, Norwegian, Danish, Finnish, Swedish and French (Region 1)		
Release dates
United States	United Kingdom	
July 29, 2008	February 9, 2009	
