= J. C. Khoury =

American commercial and film director

J.C. Khoury is an American commercial and film director who is primarily known for broadcast television and branded content work. After graduating from Columbia University, Khoury enrolled in New York University's graduate film program. His short film Michael Bell (2001) premiered at the Slamdance Film Festival and won the Anarchy Award. StudioNext commissioned a web series written, produced, and directed by Khoury based on the title character. His short film Model Chaser (2002) won the Hamptons International Film Festival Student Film Award.

J.C. Khoury edited the 2005 documentary The Outsider. Khoury's commercial work is part of the permanent collection of the MoMA.

J.C. Khoury produced and directed his debut feature film The Pill, based on a screenplay he wrote, in the summer of 2010. The film stars Noah Bean, Rachel Boston, Anna Chlumsky, and Dreama Walker. His second feature film, All Relative (2014), premiered at the Woodstock and Austin Film Festivals before having a theatrical/VOD release on November 21, 2014. The film stars Connie Nielsen, Jonathan Sadowski, and Sara Paxton and became an indie bestseller on iTunes. Khoury served as an Executive Producer on the film Return To Sender (2015) starring Academy Award Nominee Rosamund Pike and Nick Nolte.
