= Eastside (film) =

- Directed by: Lorena David
- Written by: Eric P. Sherman
- Story by: Ravi Chopra
- Produced by: Ravi Chopra; Mark Roberts
- Starring: Mario Lopez; Elizabeth Bogush; Mark Damon Espinoza
- Cinematography: Lisa Wiegand
- Edited by: Ned Kerwin
- Music by: Armando Ávila
- Production company: Candlelight Films
- Distributed by: Hollywood Independents
- Release date: 1999
- Running time: 94 minutes
- Country: United States
- Language: English

Eastside is a 1999 American crime drama film directed by Lorena David, starring Mario Lopez, Elizabeth Bogush and Mark Damon Espinoza.

== Cast ==
- Mario Lopez as Antonio Lopez
- Elizabeth Bogush as Claire Gabriel
- Mark Damon Espinoza as Horatio Lopez
- Efrain Figueroa as Armando de la Rosa
- Richard Lynch as Toad

== Reception ==
Kevin Thomas of the Los Angeles Times called the film "sharp, fast and energetic" and wrote that it has "depth, dimension and wit". John Jimenez of the Video Store Magazine wrote that the film is "well-done" with "acting good enough to put it in a class above most in its genre."

TV Guide wrote that while the film was "sturdily acted", it is "basically a PSA aimed to point repeat offenders poised away from the path to perdition and on to the road to social service". Buzz McClain of the Video Business called the film "competent if unthrilling" and "too good-natured for its own good". Michael Speier of Variety wrote that while Lynch "invests his worldly wise caretaker with a degree of spirituality", the "supporting players are flat", and Lopez is "unconvincing as a young man who can steal cars and pull a trigger".
