= Mel Silver =

Mel Silver may refer to:

- Mel Silver (Waking The Dead), a character on the TV show Waking the Dead
- Mel Silver, a character on Beverly Hills, 90210
