= The Endgame =

2022 American crime thriller television series

- Genre: Crime drama; Thriller
- Created by: Nicholas Wootton & Jake Coburn
- Starring: Morena Baccarin; Ryan Michelle Bathé; Costa Ronin; Jordan Johnson-Hinds; Mark Espinoza; Noah Bean; Kamal Bolden
- Music by: Brian Tyler; Tony Morales
- Country of origin: United States
- Original language: English
- No. of seasons: 1
- No. of episodes: 10

Production
- Executive producers: Emily Cummins; Andrew Schneider; Julie Plec; Justin Lin; Jake Coburn; Nicholas Wootton; Randy Zisk
- Producers: Nick Bradley; Jane Raab; Morena Baccarin
- Cinematography: Oliver Bokelberg; David Tuttman; Peter Vietro-Hannum
- Editors: Kelly Matsumoto; Dylan Highsmith; Christine Kim; Kimberly Ettinger; William Lynch; Ken Ramos
- Running time: 43 minutes
- Production companies: My So-Called Company; Perfect Storm Entertainment; Nicholas Wootton Productions; Jake Coburn Productions, Inc.; Universal Television

Original release
- Network: NBC
- Release: February 21 – May 2, 2022

The Endgame is an American crime drama thriller television series that premiered on NBC on February 21, until May 2, 2022. The series was created by Nicholas Wootton and Jake Coburn. In May 2022, the series was canceled after one season.

== Premise ==
In this heist drama, criminal mastermind Elena Federova squares off against principled FBI agent Val Turner.

== Cast ==
=== Main ===
- Morena Baccarin as Elena Federova
- Ryan Michelle Bathé as FBI Special Agent Val Turner
- Costa Ronin as Sergey Vodianov
- Jordan Johnson-Hinds as FBI Special Agent Anthony Flowers
- Mark Damon Espinoza as FBI Director Rogelio Réal
- Noah Bean as FBI Assistant Director in Charge Patrick Doak
- Kamal Bolden as Owen Turner

=== Recurring ===
- Karl Josef Co as Louie
- Massiel Mordan as Rona

== Production ==
On April 21, 2021, The Untitled Nick Wootton/Jake Coburn Project was given a pilot order by NBC. It was created by Nicholas Wootton and Jake Coburn who were expected to executive produce alongside Julie Plec and Emily Cummins. Wootton also wrote the pilot. On September 21, 2021, NBC ordered The Endgame to series. Justin Lin and Andrew Schneider were added as executive producers. Lin also directed the pilot. Universal Television, Nicholas Wootton Productions, Jake Coburn Productions, Inc., My So-Called Company, and Perfect Storm Entertainment are the production companies involved with producing the series. Upon the series order, Morena Baccarin, Ryan Michelle Bathé, Kamal Angelo Bolden, Costa Ronin, Noah Bean, Jordan Johnson-Hinds, and Mark D. Espinoza were cast in starring roles. On November 18, 2021, Karl Josef Co and Massiel Mordan were added to the cast. The series premiered on February 21, 2022. On May 12, 2022, NBC canceled the series after one season.

== Episodes ==
No.	Title	Directed by	Written by	Original air date	U.S. viewers (millions)
1	"Pilot"	Justin Lin	Teleplay by : Nicholas Wootton; Story by : Nicholas Wootton & Jake Coburn	February 21, 2022	3.30
Criminal mastermind Elena Federova is captured and brought to Fort Totten, New York, where US Attorney General Reid Doblin, FBI Director Rogelio Réal, and Homeland Secretary Joan Bradbury propose a plea deal. But Federova orchestrates hits on seven banks, including the Federal Reserve, drawing the attention, as she'd hoped, of a highly principled and dedicated FBI Agent, Val Turner; Federova has tangled with Val in the past and was even involved in an attempt to kill Val in Gambia. Val consistently anticipates Federova's moves and deduces that Federova led the Feds to herself on purpose; she also deduces that Federova's law firm represents her husband, ex-FBI Agent Owen Turner, in their pending divorce; Owen's divorce lawyer, Michael Bagnall, reveals that Federova can exonerate Owen (who's in prison) because she framed him. Federova ultimately proves Doblin is an embezzler, forcing his resignation. Her husband, Sergey Vodianov, thought dead, is revealed to be alive and in prison.
2	"Fairytale Wedding"	Randy Zisk	Nicholas Wootton	February 28, 2022	2.21
In a flashback, Sergey's mother (Federova's surrogate mother) dies at their wedding; Federova and Sergey vow to get revenge. In the present, Snow White (Federova's people) kidnap Bradbury's son Jensen. Val finds Jensen and figures out the code to his bomb harness: "Isaac Bigby", her mother's killer. The second bank's manager, Lawton, starts having a panic attack. Val deduces that there's always another layer with Federova; the FBI finds Federova's trunk in Val's car. Lawton's panic attack was induced by Federova's lieutenant Rona; his shoe has a thumb drive taped to it on which is proof that Bradbury accepted bribes from the Veracruz Cartel; the FBI arrests her. Federova's trunk contains a photo of Owen with Sergey and herself. Federova claims she's exposing the rot within the system and Val will come to see things her way. Owen gives Val a four-leaf clover and wishes her luck in her fight against Federova. Sergey is shown to be sending Federova messages from inside the prison.
3	"Bury the Lede"	Laura Belsey	Lisa Takeuchi Cullen	March 7, 2022	1.87
The photo's from Argentina, where Owen was shot by a Ukrainian crime family, the Beloks, while meeting with Sergey and Federova undercover; being told about the Beloks is what opened Owen's eyes according to Federova. Snow White lock hostage Arushi Banerjee in the fifth bank's vault; they demand newsman Tyler Erickson for Arushi's freedom. Sergey recognizes a new prisoner, Horek. Snow White escape the bank. Val finds a dead body; Arushi reveals Ming Lee, the dead woman, was her friend and was working on an important story. Val finds Ming's files, which reveal Erickson took money from the Beloks when he worked for President Cutler. DNA under Ming's nails and a comb Erickson left with Val are enough to force Erickson to admit to killing Ming. Val finds Doblin and Bradbury worked alongside Erickson at the White House. Federova claims she just wants to be friends with Val. The four-leaf clover matches a book by Anton Chekhov in Val's house which contains a thumb drive.
4	"#1 with a Bullet"	Jono Oliver	Sylvia L. Jones	March 14, 2022	2.00
The drive has an audio recording from Gambia, where Federova fired a shot to warn Val of a trap; Val saw it as an attempt to kill her. Federova's lieutenant Louie (Rona's fiancé), who was in Gambia, escapes the first bank and sets a harmless laser trap for Doak; Val and Anthony capture him. The lasers reveal a wall safe; the bank owner Moustakas claims it's not his. Owen helps Sergey neutralize Horek. Val realizes the guns firing in the recording are American M16s, and the safe reveals that when he worked in the State Department, Moustakas was involved in money laundering and the sale of stolen American arms to Gambian warlord Khalil Suma; Val tried to take him down and Federova murdered him. Enraged by Réal's suggestion that he defer to Val, Doak swears he'll destroy her. A photo in Moustakas's office shows Doblin, Bradbury, Erickson, and Moustakas during their time in the Cutler administration watching something. Val figures out how Federova's getting her information.
5	"Gold Rush"	Bille Woodruff	Moira Kirland	March 21, 2022	1.81
In 2018, Federova and Sergey kill Pasha Antonov, their wedding's bomber. The photo shows Federova's targets watching the explosion. Ahmed Abdel, a target, revamped the Federal Reserve's security; the Reserve is Snow White's next target. Three gunmen try to kill Abdel, but Federova denies involvement. In 2018, Federova and Sergey find out she's pregnant and turn Abdel instead of killing him. Owen denies knowing Val would be in danger. The FBI retake the Reserve. Owen and Sergey know the Beloks hired the gunmen; Owen threatens to kill both Sergey and Federova if Val gets hurt. Abdel reveals he hired Antonov and helped Federova to redeem himself. Réal reveals the messages to Federova are coming from Peekskill Prison and orders Val not to visit Owen; Val decides that Owen's on Federova's side, not hers. Snow White are revealed to have sneaked a fake gold bar into the Reserve which has a bomb inside. Federova gives Val Isaac Bigby's address and reveals he's alive.
6	"Judge, Jury and Executioner"	Monica Raymund	Naomi G. Davis	March 28, 2022	1.50
Snow White kidnap another target, Judge Caroline Walsh, helped by a man she put away—Jamie Alfonso. Doak offers Rona Louie for the hostages in the second bank, but fails to capture them during the exchange. Following the witnesses in Alfonso's case, Val finds him and Walsh. Alfonso extracts a confession before escaping; Walsh is revealed to have put away innocent people in show trials for the Beloks. Doak finds and captures Louie and Rona; they are revealed to have paid Alfonso $10 million. Horek is revealed to have help on the inside of the prison, worrying Sergey and Owen. The bank servers reveal Bigby was an FBI informant (cementing Federova and Val's connection as being that of US government involvement in the deaths of their mothers); Val sees Bigby die from a cigarette laced with heroin (Federova's specialty). Val confronts Federova but the power goes out at Totten, including in Louie and Rona's cells, during their conversation.
7	"Sleepover"	Lauren Petzke	Aadrita Mukerji	April 11, 2022	1.51
Federova claims Lucas Crowe, a rogue CIA operative and her last target, is after her; Crowe stabs Louie when he and Rona leave their cells. Anthony heads to Totten so Val can decode a message sent to Federova from Peekskill. White House Chief of Staff Julia Swanstrom tells Doak the President wants him in charge instead of Réal. Anthony lands on a landmine meant for Crowe. Horek incites a riot and tries to kill Sergey; Owen accidentally kills him. Val, Federova and Rona save Anthony; Rona and Réal save Louie; Val and Federova kill Crowe, who claims he's there on the "highest authority". Réal and Val start getting suspicious about Doak when he starts questioning why Crowe was there. Val and Anthony figure out the message leads to Federova's daughter, Sofiya. Owen is taken to solitary. In flashbacks, a woman named Natalia gets close to Federova and tries to kill her and Sergey; in the present, Peekskill's warden is revealed to be in league with Natalia after the riot; he calls her "Lady Belok".
8	"All That Glitters"	Omar Madha	Margarita Matthews	April 18, 2022	1.46
Snow White abduct Swanstrom while she's with Doak, leaving clues about the Federal Reserve. Réal suggests kidnapping Sofiya; Val pushes back; Réal benches Doak to no avail. In the past, Federova sends Sofiya away after a horrifying encounter with an imprisoned Belok. A conspiracy theorist (the Serial Skeptic) assembles a crowd at the Federal Reserve and leads Val to a clay mine. Réal sends a team to the farm. Val and Doak save Swanstrom; Val deduces President Wright is the target; Swanstrom reveals Wright helped her buy the mine. Doak threatens to fire Val, confirming he's Réal's replacement. Snow White's gold bar is a smoke bomb; the sprinklers melt the gold; it's clay dressed with gold paint; the Belok from the flashback hid the real gold somewhere in New York; a firefighter at the Reserve gives the Skeptic video of the melted gold; Réal warns Doak not to mess with him; Federova's plan to destabilize the US government is revealed; the Skeptic releases the video of the gold online.
9	"Beauty and the Beast"	Christine Moore	Cristina Boada	April 25, 2022	1.72
Federova tells Val about a matryoshka; Wright sends Doak for the gold and tortures Federova himself; the Skeptic dies; Val finds his Belok files; Federova calls Wright a Belok pawn; the Skeptic's files suggest Belok involvement in Wright's primary opponent's husband Michael Tirado's death during the presidential election; Natalia kept evidence in the matryoshka; Federova claims it's in a Snow White-held bank; Wright orders her death, takes over the gold hunt as Doak discovers his aide's involvement and orders the retaking of the bank. Val rightly suspects the matryoshka's in the last bank; it has video linking Wright to Tirado's death; Snow White surrenders both banks. Sergey sees Owen with a burner phone. Wright's aides bury Federova alive. Wright threatens Val with Natalia when she informs him she'll use the video if he tries anything; Federova's still alive. The gold's in the buttons Peekskill prisoners are making; Owen and Sergey plan to escape aboard one of the trucks transporting it.
10	"Happily Ever After"	David Tuttman; Randy Zisk	Lisa Takeuchi Cullen & Moira Kirland	May 2, 2022	1.45
In the past, Federova narrates her plan to Sofiya as a bedtime story. In the present, the Beloks camouflage the trucks; Sergey and Owen hijack one; Sergey turns on Owen. Snow White rescues Federova; she and Sofiya evade Doak. Val realizes Sergey is alive and deduces Federova's plan; the Peekskill warden calls Natalia. As Val suspected, three Belok trucks are at the docks; a driver is revealed to be undercover CIA, as is Owen. Doak apparently plans to blackmail Wright; Réal swears Halima and Anthony to secrecy about it even from Val. Val deduces Sergey and Owen's location and saves Owen. Federova arrives and implies she has enough dolls to bring the Beloks down; the Vodianovs leave. Natalia threatens Wright; the Beloks ambush the Vodianovs, kill Sergey and kidnap Sofiya, demanding the gold. Val tells Owen to leave because she can't forgive him; she finds a map of the locations of the dolls based on one of Federova's comments; Federova calls her for help.

== Reception ==
=== Critical response ===
On review aggregator website Rotten Tomatoes, the series holds a 33% approval rating based on 12 reviews, with an average rating of 5.4/10. The website's critics consensus reads, "While Morena Baccarin's vampish performance is commendably campy, The Endgame is too contrived and silly to justify its labyrinthine structure." On Metacritic, the series has a score of 44 out of 100, based on 7 reviews, indicating "mixed or average reviews".

=== Ratings ===
Viewership and ratings per episode of The Endgame
No.	Title	Air date	Rating (18–49)	Viewers (millions)
1	"Pilot"	February 21, 2022	0.5	3.30
2	"Fairytale Wedding"	February 28, 2022	0.3	2.21
3	"Bury the Lede"	March 7, 2022	0.3	1.87
4	"#1 with a Bullet"	March 14, 2022	0.3	2.00
5	"Gold Rush"	March 21, 2022	0.3	1.81
6	"Judge, Jury and Executioner"	March 28, 2022	0.2	1.50
7	"Sleepover"	April 11, 2022	0.2	1.51
8	"All That Glitters"	April 18, 2022	0.2	1.46
9	"Beauty and the Beast"	April 25, 2022	0.2	1.72
10	"Happily Ever After"	May 2, 2022	0.2	1.45
