= The Pill (film) =

2011 film directed by J.C. Khoury

- Directed by: J.C. Khoury
- Screenplay by: J.C. Khoury
- Produced by: J.C. Khoury; Jonathan Berke (associate producer); Trevor Herrick
- Starring: Noah Bean; Rachel Boston; Anna Chlumsky
- Cinematography: Andreas von Scheele
- Edited by: J.C. Khoury
- Music by: Didier Rachou
- Distributed by: Netflix, FilmBuff
- Release date: June 7, 2011 (Venice)
- Running time: 83 minutes
- Country: United States
- Language: English

The Pill is a 2011 American romantic comedy film starring Rachel Boston and Noah Bean.

In the film, the two leads meet casually at the party of a mutual friend and, through a pregnancy scare and full day together, gradually learn to trust each other.

Principal photography for The Pill took place in and around NYC.

== Plot ==
Mindy, a young, single woman living in New York City meets Fred and she soon takes him back to her place. After playing 'Never have I ever' during which she gets even drunker, he goes into the bathroom and finds a full, used condom in the trash. That, combined with guilt about his girlfriend, causes him to try to leave. As Mindy implies that her roommate's boyfriend is visiting, they soon embark on an evening of sex.

Initially, Fred takes too long to get the condom on, so Mindy falls asleep. At 4 a.m. she wakes up and they have unprotected sex. She insists he doesn't have to worry about a condom, and Fred has assumed she was on the pill.

The following day, Fred panics after he discovers Mindy's not on the pill. He insists that she use the day after pill, to which she unenthusiastically obliges as she's Catholic.

Soon after in the pharmacy, after Mindy takes a pill, Fred insists he's suddenly too busy to even have breakfast, so she storms out. The pharmacist insists that the process will require taking two pills, so Fred catches up and spends the day with Mindy to ensure she takes the second pill 12 hours later.

After breakfast, Mindy asks Fred to help her get the last of her things from her old apartment. He comes face-to-face with her ex Jim, who comisserates his broken heart to Fred. On the way back, as he asks, Mindy goes into detail as to why she broke things off, mentioning he was suffocating. When Fred implies that she may have given up on Jim too quickly, she initially tells him to leave.

After a minute, once Fred tries to backtrack, Mindy decides he was testing her. Acting relieved, she asks him to accompany her to a birthday party. Arriving to the suburbs, Fred finds himself face-to-face with her parents and brother. Livid, Mindy calms him, saying he's doing her a favor as her younger, recently engaged sister is coming. Fred observes how her nose is being rubbed into it, and gives her support.

As Nelly, Fred's live-in girlfriend, has sent a text message about her arrival he rushes home to meet her. He promises to return, then gets home to a scolding. Hyper-observant and controlling, she insists they get a cat although he's allergic. Fred ducks out on a faux errand, eventually finding Mindy.

They spend the evening cooking together and making love. While Fred's sleeping, Mindy finds Nelly's texts, she takes the second pill and breaks it off. Going home, the controlling Nelly pushes and he's finally able to cut her loose.

The film ends when five weeks later they both meet up again. By then, Fred has just finished his novel, and they seem to give it a new start.

== Awards ==
Dances With Films (2011)

- Honorable Mention

Gen Art Film Festival (2011)

- Audience Award
- Stargazer Award

San Diego Film Festival (2011)

- Best Actress (Rachel Boston)

== Reception ==
The film received mostly positive reviews from critics, with consistent praise being given towards the lead character Fred's unsympathetic characterization. The film holds a 70% rating on Rotten Tomatoes which gives the film a score of 70% based on reviews from 10 critics.

In a positive review for The Village Voice critic Andrew Schenker wrote "What makes Khoury’s film... is the consistency of Fred’s loathsomeness. As played by Bean, Fred is a twitchy mass of anxieties, but we’re never asked to empathize with him."

Critic Ronnie Scheib of Variety wrote a glowing review of the film: "deftly avoiding both the haphazardness of mumblecore and the fakery of studio romantic comedies, Khoury deploys a light directorial touch marked by assured thesping and a genuine appreciation for neurotic angst."
