= Jordan Johnson-Hinds =

Canadian actor (born 1989)

- Born: November 1, 1989 (age 36); Toronto, Ontario, Canada
- Education: George Brown College
- Occupation: Actor
- Years active: 2005–present

Jordan Johnson-Hinds (born November 1, 1989) is a Canadian actor. He is known for his leading roles as Keon Colby in the drama series Nurses, and as Anthony Flowers in the thriller series The Endgame.

== Early life ==
Johnson-Hinds was born and raised in Toronto. He attended Francis Libermann Catholic High School in Scarborough and spent his senior year at Blessed Mother Teresa Catholic Secondary School. He went on to attend George Brown College, where he studied the performing arts.

While taking classes, Johnson-Hinds guest-starred and worked as a background actor in a number of shows, including Life with Derek and The Jon Dore Television Show.

He is known for his leading roles as Keon Colby in the drama series Nurses, and as Anthony Flowers in thriller series The Endgame.

== Filmography ==
=== Film ===
Year	Title	Role	Notes
2009	Stray	Preston Biggs	
2012	Rainbow Connection	James	
2014	RoboCop	Jerry White	
2015	The Rainbow Kid	Punk #1	
2017	John Lives Again	Richard	
2021	Yes Day	Security guard	
2023	Ambush	Rusty	
2023	The Retirement Plan	Jimmy	
2023	Warrior Strong	Bilal Irving	

=== Television ===
Year	Title	Role	Notes
2007	Life with Derek	Football player	One episode
2009	Flashpoint	Remo Benzina	One episode
2009	Guns	Teen	One episode
2009	The Jon Dore Television Show	Basketball player #5	One episode
2010	Rookie Blue	Jogger	One episode
2012	The L.A. Complex	Kevin Rainer	18 episodes
2012	Beauty & the Beast	Tap That	One episode
2014	The Best Laid Plans	Pete	Six episodes
2014	The Listener	Matt Carter	One episode
2014–2017	Teenagers	Ryan	Eight episodes
2014–2018	Odd Squad	Ronny	Eight episodes
2015	Saving Hope	Sean Danes	One episode
2016	Blindspot	Stuart	Seven episodes
2016	The Beaverton	Anthony Morris	One episode
2016–2018	Suits	Oliver Grady	14 episodes
2016–2018	Murdoch Mysteries	Nate Desmond	Five episodes
2016–2019	Letterkenny	Fisky	18 episodes
2017	Shadowhunters	Gideon	One episode
2020	Upload	Jamie	Eight episodes
2020–2021	Nurses	Keon Colby	Main cast; 20 episodes
2022	The Endgame	Anthony Flowers	Main cast; 10 episodes
