= Ruth Crocker =

Ruth W Crocker
- Born: Ruth Harriet Whipple; December 10, 1946 (age 79); Mystic, Connecticut, United States
- Occupations: Writer, author
- Children: Noah Bean
- Writing career
- Genre: Non-fiction
- Notable works: Those Who Remain: Remembrance and Reunion After War
- Website: ruthcrocker.com

Ruth Whipple Crocker (born December 10, 1946) is an American writer and author of the memoir Those Who Remain: Remembrance and Reunion After War, which began as a Pushcart Prize-nominated essay in O-Dark-Thirty.

== Biography ==
Crocker was born in 1946 in Mystic, Connecticut. After attending Mitchell College in New London, Connecticut, she met and married West Point officer David R. Crocker, Jr. When her husband died during the Vietnam War, Crocker went back to school and received a B.S. from the University of Connecticut; an MA in education from Tufts University; and a PhD in nutrition and human development from the University of Connecticut. She received her MFA in creative writing from Bennington College in 2011. Her nonfiction essay "Sam's Way" in The Gettysburg Review was listed as a notable essay of 2012 in Best American Essays 2013.

Crocker was a member of the National Board and National Newsletter Editor of the Gold Star Wives of America. She resides in Mystic, Connecticut, and has one son, Noah Bean.
