= All Relative =

- Film poster
- Directed by: J. C. Khoury
- Written by: J. C. Khoury
- Produced by: Trevor Herrick; J.C. Khoury
- Starring: Connie Nielsen
- Cinematography: Andreas von Scheele
- Edited by: J.C. Khoury
- Music by: Didier Rachou
- Production company: Shoot First Entertainment
- Distributed by: FilmBuff
- Release date: October 18, 2014 (Woodstock)
- Running time: 85 minutes
- Country: United States
- Language: English

All Relative is a 2014 American independent romantic comedy-drama film directed by J.C. Khoury and starring Connie Nielsen.

== Plot ==
After being rebuffed by Grace who says she's just started dating someone, Harry is seduced by older woman Maren who says she just wants sex. While he is still in bed with Maren, Maren gives him advice on how to text Grace and Grace agrees to go on a date with him. After this date, when Maren and Harry are about to have sex, Grace contacts Harry again asking for support after she broke up with her boyfriend. Harry leaves, hurting Maren.

A month later Grace invites Harry to meet her parents and there Harry and Maren meet again as she is Grace's mother. After various histrionics in which Maren threatens to tell her husband about her infidelity, Harry gives advice to Phil (Maren's husband/Grace's father) helping Phil reconnect with Grace after he had an extra-marital affair. After this reconciliation, Harry also tells Maren that he plans to tell Grace he had sex with Maren. To prevent this Maren secretly sends an email to Grace from Harry's phone breaking up with her.

A week later at a party which Phil invites Harry to, Grace is very happy to see Harry. Harry confesses his love for her to Grace, and then he admits to Grace that he had sex with Maren. Phil is more amused than upset that his wife had an affair with her daughter's boyfriend. In a heart to heart talk, Maren confesses to Grace that she sent the email and tells Grace to do what makes her happy. When Harry turns up at her doorstep, Grace lets him and they have sex for the first time.

During the credits the four main characters are seen celebrating together at the parents' house.

== Cast ==
- Connie Nielsen as Maren
- Jonathan Sadowski as Harry
- Sara Paxton as Grace
- Al Thompson as Jared

== Reception ==
On Rotten Tomatoes the film has a 10% rating based on reviews from 10 critics.
