= Elizabeth Bogush =

American actress

- Born: Perth Amboy, New Jersey, U.S.
- Occupation: Actress
- Years active: 1993–present
- Children: 1

Elizabeth Bogush is an American actress. She has appeared in the main cast or regular recurring cast of a variety of television series, including NCIS: Los Angeles and Masters of Sex, as well as Titans, and October Road. She was born in Perth Amboy, New Jersey.

== Early life ==
Elizabeth Bogush was born on September 24, 1977 in Perth Amboy, New Jersey

== Personal life ==
Bogush has been married twice. Her daughter was born in 2013.

== Filmography ==
=== Film ===
| Year | Title | Role | Notes |
|---|---|---|---|
| 1999 | Eastside | Claire Gabriel | |
| 2005 | Tweek City | Sharon Wasley | |
| 2006 | Starstruck | Elizabeth | Direct-to-video |
| 2006 | Jam | Jen | |
| 2007 | Believers | Deborah | Direct-to-video |
| 2012 | Acting Like Adults | Laura | |
| 2018 | Shattered Memories | Holly | |

=== Television ===
| Year | Title | Role | Notes |
|---|---|---|---|
| 1995 | The Adventures of Pete & Pete | Diane Sinsky | Episode: "The Trouble with Teddy" |
| 1998 | Profiler | Trish Lambert | Episode: "Die Beautiful" |
| 1998 | Hang Time | Taylor | Episode: "Lend a Helping Hammer" |
| 1998 | V.I.P. | Peri Woodman | Episode: "Deconstructing Peri" |
| 1998 | Legacy | N/A | Episode: "The Big Fix" |
| 1999 | Beverly Hills, 90210 | Cherise | Episodes: "The Phantom Menace", "Let's Eat Cake", "You Better Work" |
| 1999 | Time of Your Life | Claire | Episode: "The Time the Truth Was Told" |
| 2000 | Felicity | Pam | Episodes: "Things Change", "Party Lines" |
| 2000 | Undressed | Dinah | TV series |
| 2000–2001 | Titans | Jenny Williams | Main role (13 episodes) |
| 2001 | Seven Days | Deedee Maxwell | Episode: "The First Freshman" |
| 2002 | Everybody Loves Raymond | Angela | Episode: "She's the One" |
| 2002 | Scrubs | Alex Hanson | Episodes: "My Blind Date", "My Balancing Act", "My Drug Buddy" |
| 2003 | Platonically Incorrect | | TV film |
| 2003 | She Spies | Amy | Episode: "You Don't Know Jack" |
| 2003 | A.U.S.A. | Olivia | Episode: "Pilot" |
| 2003 | American Dreams | Katie Davis | Episode: "The One" |
| 2003 | ER | Debra Strickland | Episode: "Finders Keepers" |
| 2004–2005 | The Mountain | Max Dowling | Main role (12 episodes) |
| 2005 | Washington Street | | TV film |
| 2005 | Breadwinners | Elizabeth Fuller | TV film |
| 2005 | How I Met Your Mother | Amanda | Episode: "Belly Full of Turkey" |
| 2006 | Happy Hour | Lucy | Episode: "Crazy Girls" |
| 2007–2008 | October Road | Alison Rowan | Recurring role (12 episodes) |
| 2008 | Play or Be Played | Emily Frayne | TV film |
| 2008 | Gemini Division | Dr. Elizabeth Gavillan / Dr. Jill Sinclair | Episodes: "Insertion Point", "Deep Cover", "Kill Jill", "Salvation" |
| 2009 | Scrubs | Alex Hanson | Episode: "My Finale: Part 2" |
| 2009 | The Big Bang Theory | Dr. Catherine Millstone | Episode: "The Pirate Solution" |
| 2009–10 | The Forgotten | Greta Wilkes | Episodes: "River John", "Lucky John", "Donovan Doe" |
| 2010 | Marry Me | Trudy Rumson | TV miniseries |
| 2011 | Big Mike | Caroline Hayworth | TV film |
| 2011 | Grey's Anatomy | Gia | Episode: "Golden Hour" |
| 2011 | How to Be a Gentleman | Thea | Episode: "How to Have a One-Night Stand" |
| 2012 | Rules of Engagement | Meredith | Episode: "Meat Wars" |
| 2012 | Common Law | Lisa Clark | Episode: "Odd Couples" |
| 2012 | CSI: Crime Scene Investigation | Edie | Episode: "Code Blue Plate Special" |
| 2013 | Two and a Half Men | Emily | Episode: "Throgwarten Middle School Mysteries" |
| 2013 | The Mentalist | Alex Wiley | Episode: "Red Lacquer Nail Polish" |
| 2013–2014 | Masters of Sex | Elise Langham | Episodes: "Love and Marriage", "Parallax", "Asterion" |
| 2014–2015, 2017–2023 | NCIS: Los Angeles | Joelle Taylor | Recurring role |
| 2015 | The Messengers | Kay Fairburn | 3 episodes |
| 2015–2016 | The Young and the Restless | Dr. Sandy Anderson | Recurring role |
| 2016 | Criminal Minds | Elle Zumwalt | Episode: "The Sandman" |
| 2017 | Training Day | Judy Burns | Episode: "Tehrangles" |
| 2018 | American Woman | Sherry | Episode: "Changes and The New Normal" |
| 2019–2020 | The Blacklist | Elodie Radcliffe | 6 episodes (season 7) |

Bogush has also appeared in commercials for the text messaging service KGB.
