= Tweek City =

- Directed by: Eric G. Johnson
- Written by: Eric G. Johnson
- Produced by: Eric G. Johnson; Yule Caise; Caitlin Maynard
- Starring: Giuseppe Andrews; Keith Brunsmann; Eva Fisher; Elizabeth Bogush
- Cinematography: Barry Stone
- Edited by: Sharon Rutter
- Music by: Jim Latham
- Distributed by: Maverick Entertainment Group
- Release dates: May 8, 2005 (Dances With Films Festival); November 2006
- Country: United States
- Language: English

Tweek City is an American film written and directed by Eric G. Johnson and starring Giuseppe Andrews, Keith Brunsmann, Eva Fisher, and Elizabeth Bogush.

The film premiered on May 28, 2005 in Santa Monica, California at the Dances With Films Festival. In 2006, Maverick Entertainment Group acquired the worldwide rights and on January 2, 2007 they released it on DVD throughout the United States.

== Plot ==
The film depicts a harrowing week in the life of Bill Jensen, a young, sexually confused, half-Latino speed-dealer in San Francisco's Mission District.

As the week begins, Bill picks up a bag of speed and starts walking the streets in a desperate attempt to make some money and, more importantly, escape his nightmares. Streetwalking leads to bed-hopping and Bill falls for a one-night stand just long enough to earn, and subsequently, betray her trust. When Bill wakes up from the whole affair in an excretory abyss, his friend Jerm provides some support, however Bill fails to express what's truly bothering him.

Just when Bill might open up, Jerm drags him to a punk show, takes an ill-advised stage dive and becomes incapacitated. Left alone, Bill can’t cope and he plunges into a speed-induced, downward spiral that takes him on a nocturnal journey through the streets of San Francisco, and ultimately down to Los Angeles, where he crashes his high school sweetheart's wedding. From his sleep-deprived, hallucinogenic state, Bill makes a desperate attempt to reconnect with Sharon, his first, and only, love.

== DVD features ==
- Director Commentary
- Still Gallery
- 5.1 Surround Sound
- Interactive Menus
- Scene Selections
