= Noah Bean =

American actor (born 1978)

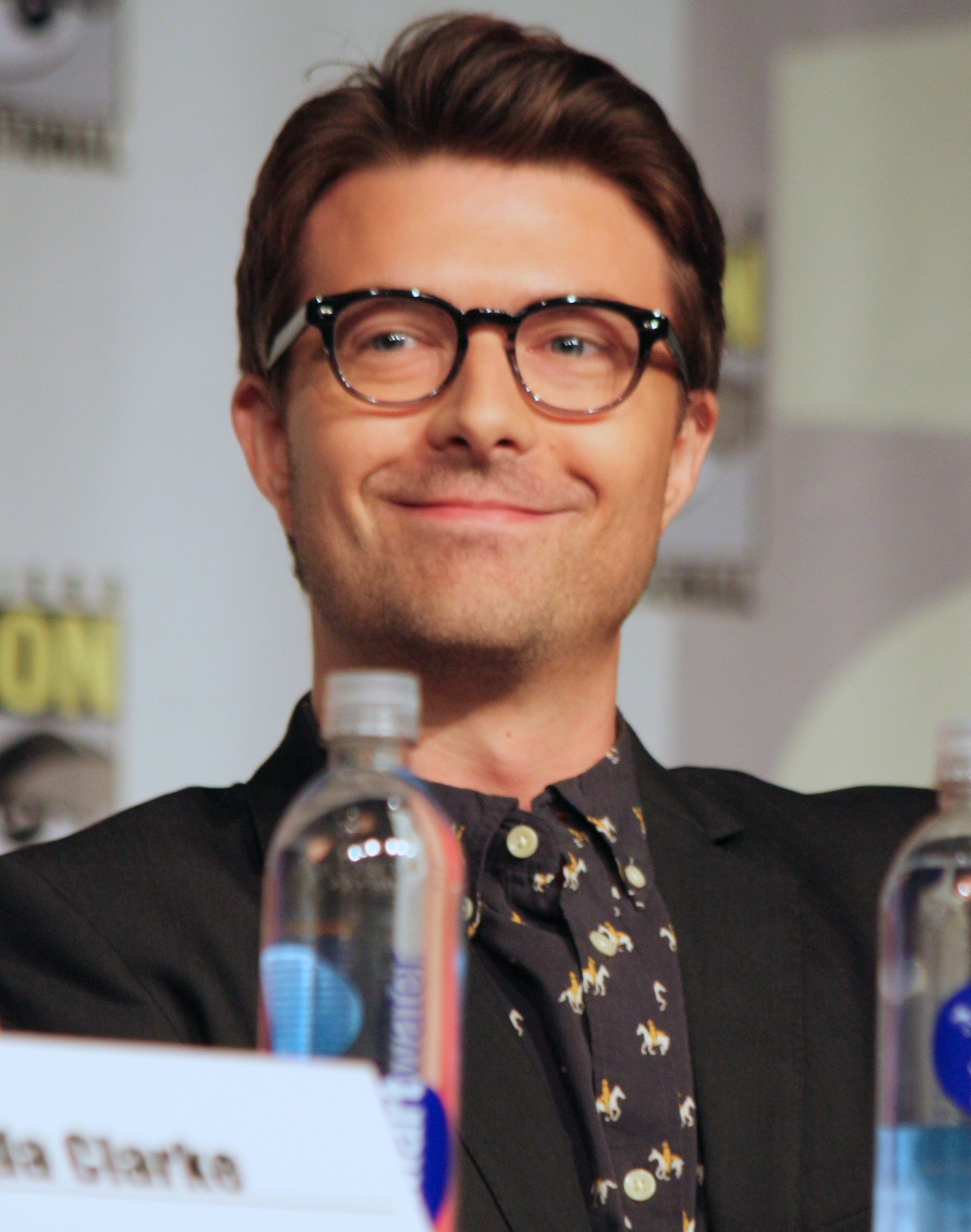
- Bean at the 2013 San Diego Comic-Con
- Born: Noah Whipple Bean; August 20, 1978 (age 47); Boston, Massachusetts, United States
- Education: Boston University (BFA)
- Occupation: Actor
- Years active: 1998–present
- Spouse: Lyndsy Fonseca (m. 2016)
- Children: 2

Noah Whipple Bean (born August 20, 1978) is an American actor known for his roles as Ryan Fletcher on The CW action-thriller series Nikita, as David Connor on the FX legal drama Damages and his leading performance in the independent film The Pill. He also starred as Aaron Marker in the first season of Syfy's 12 Monkeys.

== Career ==
Prior to his role on Damages, Bean had a number of minor and less notable roles on the television series Law & Order: Special Victims Unit, Ed, Joan of Arcadia, Numb3rs, and Crumbs, the films Williamstowne and Stay, and a number of commercials.

He also starred as Daniel in 'The Stable Boy', from the first season then in 'The Doctor' from the second season of 'Once Upon a Time'.

He labels his signing on the role of David Connor on Damages, the fiancé of the protagonist, as being "lucky", praising the script of the show and also the fact that it is shot in New York City, where he is currently living. He also says he was aware that his character dies in the first season and was disappointed but "thrilled" for the opportunity to have a full season. He also summarizes working with Glenn Close, Željko Ivanek and Ted Danson as "a dream come true". Bean returned for guest appearances in one episode each of the show's second, third, and fifth seasons.

Bean has also been involved in theatre, Broadway and off-Broadway. His first role was in Philadelphia Here I Come!, a role which he was offered when the originally cast actor left the show four days before the opening. He co-runs a theatre company, Stage 13, with several other actors, directors and playwrights, including Dan Fogler, in New York, and although he prefers screen acting, he says, "I love the theater and would always go back to do a play if it was an exciting project." He appeared as a guest star in the episode "Ability" of the TV series Fringe. In 2015, he starred as Aaron Marker in Syfy's Science-Fiction series 12 Monkeys.

He was also a series regular on The CW television series Nikita, as CIA Agent Ryan Fletcher.

In 2025, Bean appeared as Jake Pearlman in the Amazon Prime series Ballard.

== Personal life ==
Bean was born in Boston, Massachusetts. As a child, Bean attended Pine Point School and The Williams School in Connecticut. An only child, he describes himself as being so quiet and shy that his school would phone his parents asking whether anything was wrong at home: "I was deathly shy and basically scared of people in general." In high school, his mother encouraged him to become involved in drama, which he says helped him open up, "I found when I had a script in my hand I could speak." He later attended Boston University's College of Fine Arts before he was offered his first theatre role by director Michael Ritchie.

The son of Ruth Crocker, an author, and Richard Robert Bean, a housebuilder, Bean hails from Mystic, Connecticut, although he has lived and worked in Los Angeles and is currently living in New York City. He is friends with actor Seth Gabel and director Jack Bender and also says he has come to be good friends with Damages co-actor and on-screen fiancée Rose Byrne.

Bean began a relationship with his Nikita co-star Lyndsy Fonseca in 2013. In February 2016, Fonseca announced their engagement, and they were married on October 2, 2016. They have two daughters: Greta born in 2018 and Evelyn born in 2022.

== Filmography ==
=== Film ===
Year	Title	Role	Notes
1998	Williamstowne	Tom	
2009	Peter and Vandy	Andrew	
2009	Hysterical Psycho	Chuck	
2010	Morning Glory	First Date	
2011	Ghost of New Orleans	Paul Marais	
2011	The Pill	Fred	
2012	The Break-Up Tour	Mike	Short
2012	Ex-Girlfriends	Tom	
2012	Beneath the Sheets	Dave	Short
2013	Black Marigolds	Ryan Cole	
2016	Lemon	Barry	Short
2017	Curvature	Wells	
2017	My 'Friend' Mick	Niall	Short, post-production
2019	The Report	Martin Heinrich	
2021	King Richard	Steven	

=== Television ===
Year	Title	Role	Notes
2000–01	Ed	Tim Cooper	Recurring role (4 episodes)
2003	Joan of Arcadia	Officer Osbourne	Episode: "Pilot"
2006	Crumbs	Paul	Episode: "Maybe I'm Tony Randall"
2007–2012	Damages	David Connor	Main role (13 episodes)
2008	Medium	Charles Winters	Episode: "Drowned World"
2008	The Verdict	Nick	TV film
2008	Lipstick Jungle	Noah Mason	Episode: "Help!", "Let It Be"
2008	Private Practice	Shawn	Episode: "Crime and Punishment"
2009	Fringe	FBI agent	Episode: "Ability"
2009–2012	Damages	David Connor	Guest role (5 episodes)
2009	The Cleaner	Michael Zellman	Episode: "Does Everybody Have a Drink?"
2009	Dark Blue	Scott Mueller	Guest role (season 1)
2009	It's Always Sunny in Philadelphia	Art Sloan	Episode: "The Gang Reignites the Rivalry"
2010	Cold Case	Dan Palmer	Episode: "Two Weddings"
2010–2013	Nikita	Ryan Fletcher	Recurring role (seasons 1–2), main (seasons 3–4)
2012	Once Upon a Time	Daniel Colter	2 episodes
2014	Gang Related	Jason Manning	Guest role
2015–16	12 Monkeys	Aaron Marker	Main role (season 1), guest (season 2)
2016	Elementary	Craig Crismond	Episode: "A Burden of Blood"
2016	Vinyl	David Bowie	Episode: "Cyclone"
2016	12 Monkeys: Recap/Finale	Aaron Marker	TV film
2017	Shut Eye	Foster Hilburn	6 episodes
2017	Civil	Ted Wagman	TV film
2019	The Enemy Within	Christopher Shepherd	4 episodes
2020–21	9-1-1	Jeffrey Hudson	5 episodes
2021	The Baby-Sitters Club	Chaz Masters	Episode: "Jessi and the Superbrat"
2021	Invasion	David Barton	3 episodes
2022	The Endgame	Adic Jonathan Doak	Series regular
2025	Ballard	Councilman Jake Pearlman	8 episodes
2026	NCIS	DOD Chief David Barbado	Episode: "Reboot"
