= Lorena David =

American filmmaker

- Born: Los Angeles, California, U.S.
- Education: University of California, San Diego (BA, 1991)
- Occupations: Film director; Producer; Editor
- Years active: 1997–present
- Notable work: Plump Fiction; Strangers with Candy; Dark Ride; The Coverup

Lorena David is an American filmmaker known for her work as a director, producer, and editor in independent films and documentaries. She co-founded Kingsize Entertainment in 1995 and has produced films, including Plump Fiction (1997) and Danika (2006).

== Career ==
David began her career in the entertainment industry as a production assistant on Supermarket Sweep (1993), later working as a line producer on The Glass Chain and as a production coordinator on Perry Mason. In 1995, she co-founded Kingsize Entertainment with Mark Roberts.

David co-produced the parody film Plump Fiction in 1997. She also served as co-executive producer on Single Action, which was released in 1998 and featured Carlos Gallardo. The following year, she directed the drama Eastside (1999), which was described by Los Angeles Times critic Kevin Thomas as ''a well-made melodrama''. In 2001, David directed the independent thriller Outta Time, starring Nancy O'Dell. That same year, the film Poor White Trash, which had been filmed in 1999 in Benton, Illinois, was released. David subsequently directed and edited Extreme Dating (2004), followed by producing Strangers with Candy (2005), a comedy financed by David Letterman and premiered at the Sundance Film Festival in 2005 and the psychological thriller Danika, starring Marisa Tomei. In 2023, she directed The Christmas Spark, Great American Media television movie starring Mario Lopez.

== Selected filmography ==
Year	Title	Role
1997	Plump Fiction	Co-producer
1998	Single Action	Executive Producer
1999	Eastside	Director
2000	Poor White Trash	Producer
2002	Outta Time	Director, Editor
2004	Extreme Dating	Director, Editor
2005	Strangers with Candy	Producer
2005	Danika	Producer
2006	Dark Ride	Producer
2024	The Christmas Spark	Director
