= Mark Damon Espinoza =

American actor

- Born: June 24, 1960 (age 66); Beaumont, Texas, United States
- Occupation: Actor
- Years active: 1983–present
- Known for: Beverly Hills, 90210; The Young and the Restless; The Bold and the Beautiful; Days of Our Lives; Major Crimes

Mark Damon Espinoza (born June 24, 1960) is an American actor known in the NBC series The Endgame as FBI Director Rodrigo Réal.

His first starring role was "Jesse Vasquez" in the TV series Beverly Hills, 90210 from 1993 to 1995. His other credits include stage, television, and film. He is sometimes credited as Mark D. Espinoza.

== Early life ==
After graduating from college with a degree in Marketing/Economics, he spent two years in the corporate world before changing his career.

== Stage ==
Espinoza moved to New York City, where he enrolled at the Circle in the Square Theatre School and was awarded a scholarship for music performance.

Regional theatre work eventually brought Espinoza west to the Old Globe Theatre in San Diego. He also performed at The Goodman Theatre in Chicago, Berkeley Rep in California, the Alabama Shakespeare Festival, the Geffen Playhouse in Los Angeles, Portland Center Stage, Missouri Rep and others.

Cabaret work took him to Germany where he performed at The International Theatre of Frankfurt and the Frankfurt Opera House.

He began his professional acting career in the summer of 1983 at Mary Moody Northern Amphitheater in Galveston, TX, where he played Mexican General Santa Ana in the musical "Lone Star."

== Television ==
Espinoza portrayed “Jesse Vasquez", the husband of Gabrielle Carteris' character Andrea on Beverly Hills, 90210 from 1993 to 1995.

Espinoza went on to assume the role of "Carlos", Kelly Bundy's clueless boyfriend on the hit television series Married... with Children (2 episodes, 1995–1996). He also played Mexican police detective Alberto Aguilar on The Young and the Restless investigating the possible role of Victor Newman in a death that occurred in Mexico.

Subsequently, he has appeared in numerous films and theatrical productions as well as hundreds of hours of television on such notable shows as Private Practice, House, Without a Trace, Criminal Minds, Mayans M.C., American Horror Story, and Scandal, playing a variety of roles from blood-sucking priests to kind-hearted cops.

== Currently ==
When not shooting on location, Espinoza makes his home in Los Angeles where he is a father to three young women and owns and cares for three rescued dogs.

== Filmography ==
=== Television ===
Year	Title	Role	Notes
1993–1995	Beverly Hills, 90210	Jesse Vasquez	Main role
1995–1996	Married... with Children	Carlos	2 episodes
1996	Caroline in the City	Doctor	Episode: "Caroline and Victor/Victoria"
1998	Trinity	Raphael	Episode: "No Secrets"
2002	NYPD Blue	Alberto Cepeda	Episode: "Maya Con Dios"
2002	Fastlane	Eber Montalvo	
2003	The Agency	Col. Obregon	
2003	Nip/Tuck	Ron	
2003	The Lyon's Den	David Perez	
2003	Karen Sisco	Hector Zapata	
2004	JAG	Petty Officer First Class Joe Dakey	Episode: "Crash"
2004	Strong Medicine		
2005	NCIS	Sheriff Deke Lester	Episode: "Black Water"
2005	Numbers	Frank Lopez	Episode: "Bones of Contention"
2007	Moonlight	Father Garza	
2008	Big Shots	Luis	
2008	Psych	Andres	
2008	Gemini Division	Sal Diaz	
2008	Without a Trace	Sgt. Aguilera	Episode: "Rise and Fall"
2008	The Young and the Restless	Agent Roberto Aguilar	5 episodes
2008	The Mentalist	Red Brick and Ivy	Episode: "Red Brick and Ivy"
2010	House M.D.	Stan	Episode: "5 to 9"
2010	Castle	Professor Stevenson	Episode: "The Mistress Always Spanks Twice"
2010	Parenthood	Matt Fortunato	Episode: "Perchance to Dream"
2010	Outlaw	Dr. Burt Jonas	Episode: "In Re: Jessica Davis"
2010	Days of Our Lives	Justice of the Peace	3 episodes
2011	Private Practice	Richard Huvane	Episode: "Something Old, Something New"
2012	Body of Proof	Antonio Diaz	Episode: "Occupational Hazards"
2012–2015	Scandal	Chairman of Joint Chiefs	2 episodes
2013	NCIS: Los Angeles	Detective Lopez	Episode: "Purity"
2014	Perception	Victor	Episode: "Curveball"
2014	Intelligence	Joseph Bernard	
2015	The Carmichael Show	Dr. Hunter	Episode: "Kale"
2015–2016	The Bold & The Beautiful	Dr. Wolin	7 episodes
2016	Secrets & Lies	Henry Stratman	2 episodes
2016–2017	Major Crimes	Father Stan/Priest	7 episodes
2017	Sweet/Vicious	The Dean	2 episodes
2018	SEAL Team	Gen. Gene Parsons	Episode: "The Upside Down"
2018	Criminal Minds	Scott Taveras	Episode: "Cure"
2018	9-1-1	Uncle at Funeral	Episode: "Awful People"
2018–2019	Mayans M.C.	Nico Diehl	3 episodes
2019	S.W.A.T.	Jorge	Episode: "Trigger Creep"
2022	The Endgame	Rogelio Réal	Main role
2022	Quantum Leap	Alberto Sandoval	Episode: "A Decent Proposal"
2026	Matlock	Jack	Episode: "Collateral"
2026	Lanterns	Chavez	Episode: "OutKast"

=== Film ===
Year	Title	Role
1993	The Fugitive	Resident
1999	Eastside	Horacio Lopez
2010	Gerald	Cop
2014	Gutshot Straight	Schmidt
2019	American Exit	Dr. Figueroa
2020	Paper Tiger	Michael
