= Carol Potter (actress) =

American actress (born 1948)

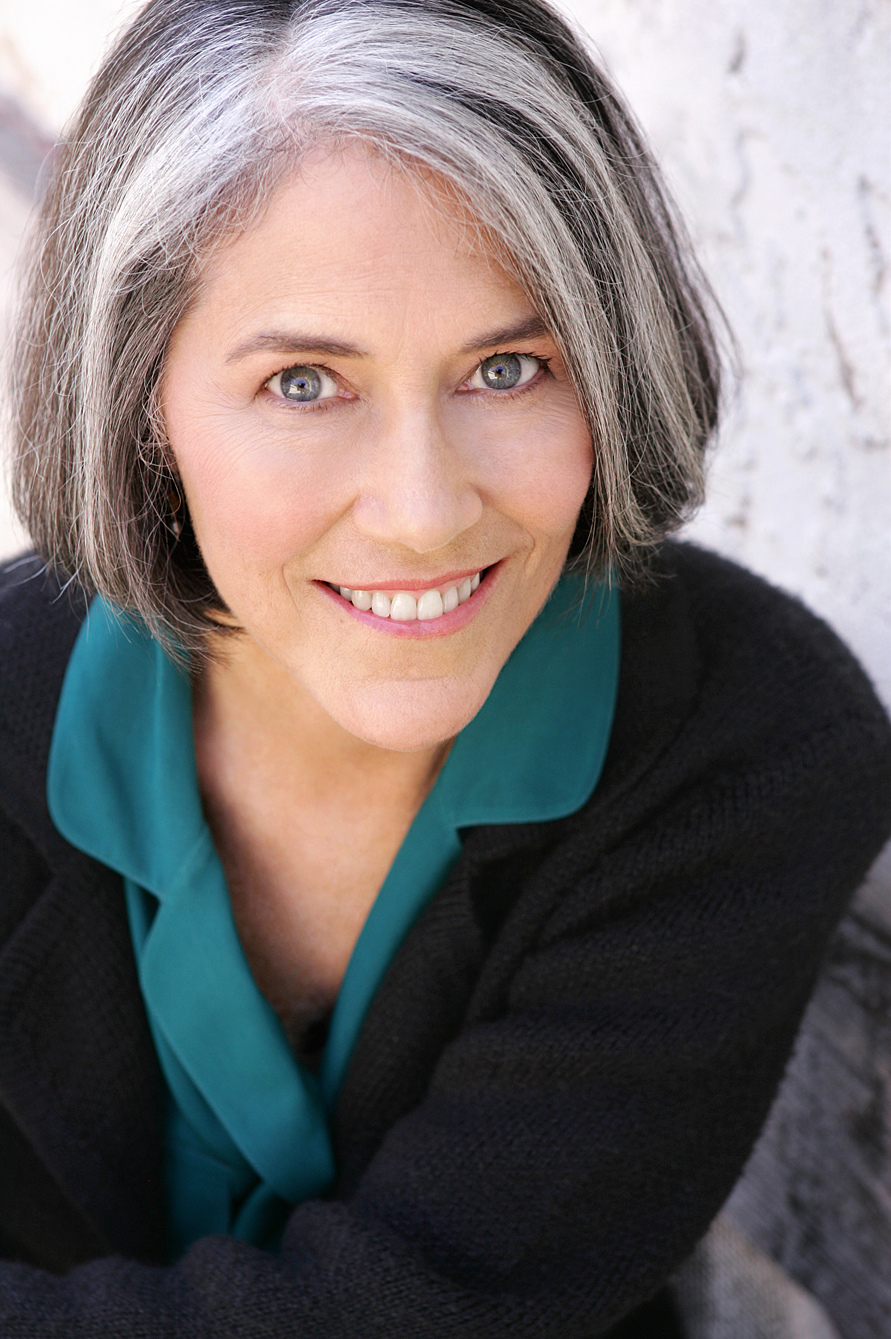
- Potter in 2008
- Born: May 21, 1948 (age 78); New York City, New York, U.S.
- Education: Radcliffe College
- Years active: 1968–present
- Spouses: Spencer Eastman (m. 1985–1988) Jeffrey Josephson (m. 1990)
- Children: 1

Carol Potter (born May 21, 1948) is an American actress best known for playing Cindy Walsh on Beverly Hills, 90210.

== Early life and education ==
Potter was born in New York City, New York, and attended high school in Tenafly, New Jersey, and went on to attend Radcliffe College, where she earned a Bachelor of Arts in social relations.

== Career ==
In 1977, she made her Broadway theatre debut in Albert Innaurato's play Gemini, which went on to become the fifth-longest running non-musical play in Broadway history.

After moving to Los Angeles, Potter performed in several dramatic roles in the theater, including Thin Walls at the Back Alley Theatre in 1984, Wendy Wasserstein's Isn't It Romantic at the L.A. Stage Company West in 1985, and the lead role of Alma Winemiller in Tennessee Williams' Summer and Smoke at the Ahmanson Theatre in 1988.

Potter had her first role as a regular in a prime time television series in 1981, playing Maggie Clinton on Today's F.B.I. She was a regular on Beverly Hills, 90210 from 1990 to 1995. In 1997, she was cast in NBC's Sunset Beach as Joan Cummings. She has also guest starred on many shows including NYPD Blue, JAG, Crossing Jordan and Providence. In 2019, Potter returned to the 90210 franchise in the spin off BH90210, where she played a version of herself as a therapist for the cast.

She also appeared on a special "TV Moms" episode of the Anne Robinson version of The Weakest Link, in which she won $124,000 for her charity, beating June Lockhart.

In 1997, Potter graduated with a master's degree in Marriage and Family Therapy from Phillips Graduate Institute. She is licensed by the state of California as a Marital and Family Therapist and has a private practice as an MFT.

== Personal life ==
In 1985, she married screenwriter Spencer Eastman, and their son Christopher was born in 1987. Three months later, Eastman was diagnosed with lung cancer, and he died in 1988. Potter married for a second time to actor Jeffrey Josephson in October 1990, the same month Beverly Hills 90210 made its television debut.

Potter is active in the Episcopal Church.

== Publications ==
- Sileo, Frank J.; Potter, Carol S. (2021). When Your Child Has a Chronic Medical Illness: A Guide for the Parenting Journey. American Psychological Association.

== Filmography ==
Year	Title	Role	Notes
1977	The Doctors	Betsy Match Manero	
1978	Annie Flynn	C.C.	
1979	One Life to Live	Beverly Wilkes	
1982	The Neighborhood	Sue Bernhardt	
1981-1982	Today's F.B.I.	Maggie Clinton	17 episodes
1984	Her Life as a Man	Elaine	
1986	L.A. Law	Mrs. Simmons	Episode: "The Princess and the Wiener King"
1987	Dutch Treat	Betsy Winters	
1987	Highway to Heaven	Janet Markham	Episode: "Wally"
1994-1995	Mighty Morphin Power Rangers	Mrs. Hart	Episodes: "Return of an Old Friend, Parts 1 & 2" & "A Brush With Destiny"
1995	Burke's Law	Emily Simmons	Episode: "Who Killed the Movie Mogul?"
1990-1995 & 1998	Beverly Hills, 90210	Cindy Walsh	Main role; seasons 1-5, guest; seasons 6 & 8
1996	Tiger Heart	Cynthia	
1997	The Burning Zone	Mrs. Mason	Episode: "The Last Five Pounds Are the Hardest"
1997-1999	Sunset Beach	Joan Cummings	134 episodes
2001	Providence	Karen Ashworth	Episode: "Rocky Road"
2001	NYPD Blue	Christine Beck	Episode: "Mom's Away"
2003	Crossing Jordan	Leslie Winton	Episode: "Cruel & Unusual"
2004	JAG	Hearing officer	Episode: "Retrial"
2009	Silent Sam	Uniform Cop on Overpass	
2009	Greek	Paula Baker	Episode: "See You Next Time, Sisters!"
2019	BH90210	”Herself”	
