= List of Beverly Hills, 90210 characters =

The original teenagers cast. Center: Dylan McKay; Clockwise from far left: Kelly Taylor, Steve Sanders, Andrea Zuckerman, Brandon Walsh, Brenda Walsh, Donna Martin, David Silver

The following is a list of characters from Beverly Hills, 90210, an American drama series that aired from October 4, 1990, to May 17, 2000, on the Fox television network before entering syndication. It is the first installment of the Beverly Hills, 90210 franchise.

== Main characters ==
=== Brandon Walsh ===
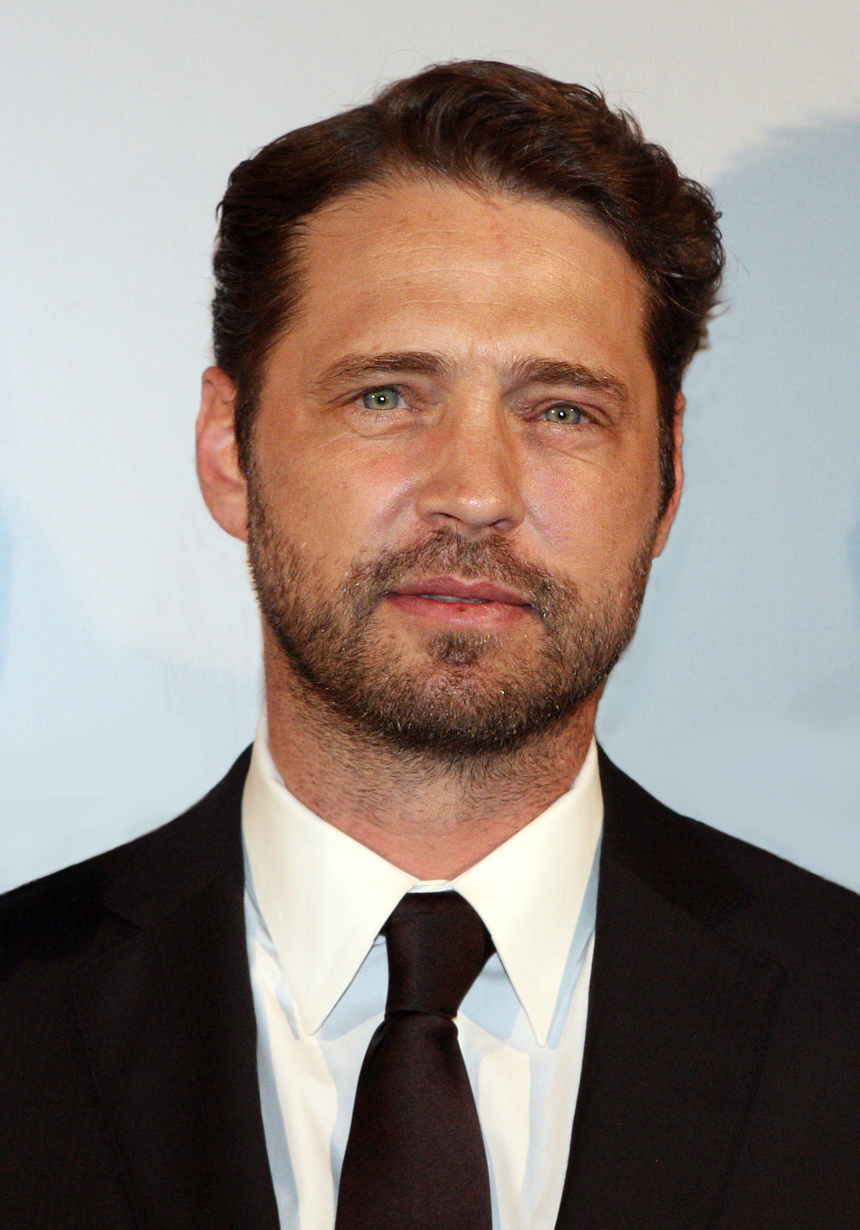
Jason Priestley appeared as male lead Brandon for Seasons 1–9, and worked extensively behind the scenes.

Jason Priestley plays the character of Brandon Andrew Walsh (main, seasons 1–9; archive footage, season 10). After Walsh's initial difficulties fitting into Beverly Hills, he soon settles down. In Season One, after one of his drinks was spiked at a party, he briefly experienced a drinking problem, which led to a car accident and a night in jail. In Season 3, Brandon developed a serious gambling problem, which led to Nat, his boss at the Peach Pit, bailing him out after he got into trouble with a mobster bookmaker. Throughout the entire series, Brandon was involved in various journalism projects, from sports editor and co-chief of the Beverly Blaze in high school to co-editor of the CU Condor, a brief stint as news director at CUTV, and a year as student-body president (sophomore year). After graduation from college, he and his friend Steve spent a year developing the Beverly Beat. He finally accepted a position with the Washington, D.C., bureau of the New York Chronicle. He was the person many turned to when in trouble — Donna's expulsion from high school, Brenda's many problems, Kelly's drug problem, Andrea's getting into Yale, Valerie's suicide attempt, Ray's lawsuit against Joe, Steve's constant stunts, and even Dylan's battle with drugs and alcohol and the murder of his wife. Brandon is mentioned in the spin-off 90210 as having a family.

Priestley's co-stars described him as the group's off-screen "quarterback". Although Priestley didn't reprise his role as Brandon in the spin-off 90210, he directed the episode where Tori Spelling's character Donna Martin returns to town. Jason Priestley was the last actor to be cast for the show.

=== Brenda Walsh ===
Shannen Doherty portrays Brenda Walsh (seasons 1–4), the twin sister of Brandon. She felt very lonely when she first arrived in Beverly Hills, but soon became friends with Donna, Kelly, Steve, David, and Andrea. She met and dated her twin brother's friend, Dylan McKay. She was the nice girl until around the second season, when her character began to progress into being more rebellious and devious. She went to Europe during the summer after her junior year of high school and had a short-lived romance with Rick (played by Dean Cain) and eventually met and almost married Stuart, the son of one of Jim's business partners. Later, after she ended this relationship, she got the lead role in a production of Cat on a Hot Tin Roof and a subsequent spot in a London summer acting program. She was able to get admission to the program and departed Beverly Hills. A letter Brandon received from Dylan revealed that he and Brenda got back together during his time in London. They would eventually split up, and Brenda would continue touring as an actress. She was mentioned from time to time after Doherty was fired from the series (especially in Season 5) but never appeared again after that point. Brenda appeared in the first season of the spin-off series 90210. Brenda returns to Beverly Hills to star in a play and takes the opportunity to spend time with Kelly after gaining success as a theater actress and stage director in London. She subsequently agrees to direct a high school musical at West Beverly Hills High when the original director is no longer available. Her relationship with Kelly and both women's lingering feelings for Dylan have become focal points for the two best friends. Brenda then finds out that she can never become pregnant. She tries to hide this fact from Kelly by trying to push her away. She later tells Kelly that she slept with Ryan. The two eventually reconcile. In the season finale, Brenda returns and offers her support to Adrianna, who is having a baby. Meanwhile, it is revealed that Brenda adopted a baby girl from China.

=== Kelly Taylor ===
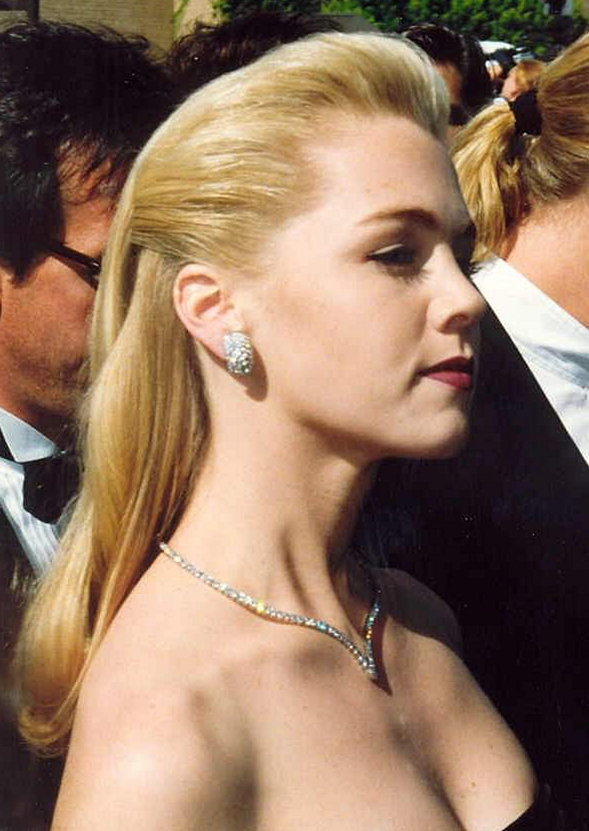
Jennie Garth at the 1992 Emmy Awards. She appeared for the show's duration as Kelly Taylor, who was significantly developed over the course of the series.

Jennie Garth portrays Kelly Marlene Taylor, the gradual main character who appears throughout the entirety of the series (and the premiere episodes of spin-offs Melrose Place and 90210), maturing from "spoiled teen vixen to grounded 25-year-old." Kelly endured several personal battles, including a drug-addicted mom, and an absent father who was later sent to jail for embezzlement. She lost her virginity to Ross Weber and was almost raped. She was almost burned alive at a rave, and later developed a coke habit from her boyfriend, which she went to rehab for, then was stalked and almost killed by her roommate. Kelly became unexpectedly pregnant before having a miscarriage and told she may never carry a child to term. She was shot during a drive-by shooting at LAX and suffered amnesia. She was raped in an alley and later shot the rapist, with the police clearing her on grounds of self-defense. She had difficulty choosing between Brandon and Dylan. When Dylan offered her a trip around the world, Brandon responded by proposing marriage, but she walked away from both offers. Erin is her half-sister and David is her stepbrother. She eventually reunited with Brandon and moved in with him, nearly marrying him. They called off the marriage at the altar, expressing a lack of being ready (just prior to Jason Priestley's departure from the series). Kelly and Donna opened their own clothing store in a mall, and Kelly started dating a lawyer from another floor of the mall, Matt Durning. The return of Dylan McKay and Matt's mentally ill wife were roadblocks in their relationship, but they did get engaged in Season 10. Later on, Kelly decided she loved Dylan most of all, and Matt decided their connection was real at D&D's wedding. She ended the engagement after learning of Matt's indescretion with another woman in the desert on an outing with Dillon. Matt left town to step in as a father figure in his nephews life after his brothers death. She left the clothing store to get into public relations. In the spin-off 90210, she and Dylan are shown to have broken up, although they share a son. She became the temporary caretaker for younger sister Erin and a guidance counselor at her alma mater, West Beverly Hills High School.

Garth departed the spin-off following the second season.

=== Steve Sanders ===
Ian Ziering portrays Steven "Steve" Sanders. Steve is a lighthearted and brash rich kid. Although irresponsible, he begins to reveal a more mature side of his personality through his friendship with Brandon Walsh. Throughout the series, he's involved in several scams and reckless activities, from obtaining a school "legacy key" to parties in rented homes, to the creation of the After Dark club in Season 5, to numerous fraternity stunts. Steve was romantically involved with Clare Arnold in Seasons 6 and 7, but they broke up after she moved to France. With his father's assistance he eventually purchased and ran his own newspaper; first with Brandon, then with a woman named Janet Sosna. In Season 10 he married Janet, and they had a child. Afterwards, they sold the Beverly Beat and decided to start a new newspaper company.

=== Andrea Zuckerman ===
Gabrielle Carteris portrays Andrea Zuckerman (main, season 1–5; guest, season 6, 8, and 10). Andrea was introduced as a focused student who was socially shy all through high school, with a huge crush on Brandon, but their relationship remained platonic. She was valedictorian, was accepted to Yale University but decided to go to CU to be near her friends and family. She was romantically involved with Dan Rubin, her resident adviser, and met Jesse Vasquez at the Walshes' 20th anniversary, where he was tending bar. When she saw him again at the Rubins' Thanksgiving dinner, they hit it off and then started dating. She later found out he was a law student at Berkeley. She got pregnant and initially decided to get an abortion, but was forced to wait a day to have the procedure and changed her mind. They were later married. The baby, born premature, was named Hannah and required time in the hospital after birth. Eventually, marital problems arose, and they both cheated on each other with someone else. They later mended their problems and moved away to Connecticut, where she attended Yale. Andrea would later appear at Steve's birthday bash and the gang's high school reunion, where it is revealed she and Jesse are getting divorced. Andrea made a cameo appearance at Donna's bachelorette party, while her daughter, Hannah (played by Hallee Hirsh), was briefly shown on the spin-off 90210.

=== Dylan McKay ===
Luke Perry portrays Dylan Michael McKay (main, seasons 1–6; special guest star, seasons 9–10), a loner in high school until he found "the gang." He had various relationships with Brenda and Kelly in high school. He felt alone until his father, Jack, got out of prison in Season 3 and they reconciled. Then Jack was apparently killed by a mafia hitman with a car bomb. It took him a long time to get over his father's death and then in Season 4 he met Erica (Noley Thornton), his half-sister, Jack's daughter, and her mother, Suzanne, and Kevin, her fiancé. Kevin spent many months convincing Dylan and Jim Walsh to invest in Kevin's environmental research company and then he and Suzanne stole the cash and ran to Brazil, taking Erica with them. Dylan had lost all his money. In Season 5, he started drinking and doing drugs again and alienated all of his friends while having an empty sexual relationship with Valerie Malone. After a near-fatal car crash, he began to recover by going through rehab and an oddball ex-FBI agent later helped him recover $7.5 million of his stolen funds, after which he rescued Erica. Afterward, he made a major play for Kelly, convinced they were soulmates. When she turned both him and Brandon down, he decided to avenge his father's murder. In Season 6, he made friends with Antonia "Toni" Marchette, the daughter of his father's killer, Anthony Marchette. He fell in love with her, gave up his quest, and married her. Her father couldn't stand them together and tried to have Dylan murdered, but the hitman killed Toni instead. After that, Dylan gave his condo to Brandon to keep an eye on and left town. He returned several years later in Season 9 and spent time living with David until he found a place. Unfortunately, Dylan's substance abuse problem returned with him and it would take an injury to Donna caused by himself to get him to kick his habit again. In Season 10, Dylan learned that his father was actually alive, with a wife and young son, and living under FBI protection with the alias Eddie Waitkus. The two were briefly reunited soon afterward, but they finally decided that Jack would be murdered by his old criminal associates if his former identity was revealed. Jack said he loved Dylan and Dylan responded in kind and they parted ways forever. He and Gina, a new friend within the group, became romantically involved for a time. In the series finale, Kelly and Dylan reunited romantically, despite her discovery that Dylan covered up for an indiscretion by Matt and didn't tell her. In the spin-off 90210, it was revealed that they'd gone their separate ways, although they share a son, Sammy.

=== David Silver ===
Brian Austin Green portrays David Silver. David always wanted to be part of the popular crowd. During Season 1, David and his best friend, Scott Scanlon, spent hours trying to be seen as cool by their peers. David succeeds by the first season, but Scott was left behind. He seemed to be on top of his life by taking a double load of classes to graduate with the gang, dating Donna, working as the school DJ and trying to have a social life, while he and the socially handicapped Scott grew apart. When Scott accidentally shot himself, it was a huge blow for David and a source of immense guilt at the state the friendship ended in. After his father Mel and Kelly's mom Jackie married and welcomed their daughter Erin, David was fully part of the gang. After a rocky start, Kelly and David eventually grew to be almost as close as blood relatives, each one helping the other through their respective drug problems. David is especially protective of Kelly during her struggle with addiction, threatening to beat her then-boyfriend Colin if he hears about him giving her drugs again. His and Donna's relationship went through several breakups and reconciliations, and he had an active romantic life during his college years that included everyone from Claire Arnold to Valerie Malone and many other guest characters. He has cheated on Donna more than once and she lost her virginity to him in the season 7 finale, where the gang graduates from university. He kicked his drug habit and managed to avoid becoming an alcoholic. The club did poorly under his management, and he discovered that he had a mild but dangerous form of depression that his mother suffered from, which he successfully dealt with via therapy and reducing his drinking. In the later seasons, following a brief music career where he had a hit song, but quit in disgust when he learned that only happened because of record company payoffs. He also hosted a radio show broadcast from the Peach Pit. He dated Sophie, then Gina, then Camille, and finally reunited with Donna, whom he married in the series finale. In the new series 90210 episode "Okaeri, Donna!" Donna reveals that she and David separated shortly after the birth of their daughter while they were living in Japan, but he sends her a card saying, "Thinking of you". It is unknown what happens after she leaves.

=== Scott Scanlon ===
Douglas Emerson portrays Scott Scanlon (main, season 1; recurring, season 2), a character that starred during Season 1 as David's nerdy best friend. Initially, they are both unpopular among the gang, but starting in Season 2, as David becomes part of the gang, the immature Scott becomes gradually more of a stranger to him as David spends less time with Scott, who becomes a recurring character rather than a regular. The only time David spends time with Scott in Season 2 is when David leaves a Halloween party to meet with Scott to talk about their "good old times". During Season 2, Scott develops an odd fascination with guns and country music after spending the summer in between Seasons 1 and 2 visiting his grandparents in Oklahoma. In the Season 2 episode "The Next 50 Years," Scott's fixation with guns ends up accidentally killing him when he spins one on his finger gunslinger-style and it discharges at him during his birthday in front of a horrified David. His last words were "Check this out." The gang buries a time capsule in Scott's memory at the episode's end. Sometime later in Season 3, David and Donna help his younger sister Sue denounce her sexually abusive uncle. Although it was never declared explicitly, Sue suggested that Scott may have been molested himself. The genesis for Scott's sudden and final departure from the series was due to the show needing to cut their budget. This is why Scott was not included in the Season 2 summer episodes. The show decided to take Scott's exit as a chance to address gun violence that was occurring in LA at the time.

=== Donna Martin ===
Tori Spelling portrays Donna Marie Martin. She is very ditzy and sweet. She began dating David Silver in high school. David respected her decision to abstain from premarital sex, until he cheated on her with Ariel. She found out that she had a learning disability, which, undiagnosed, had caused her to have a tough time in school. After high school, she was in an abusive relationship with Ray Pruit, who was mean and manipulative, almost from the start. She later dated Joe Bradley, a quarterback at CU. She was beaten and almost raped by Garrett Slan and was held hostage at the CU television studio by a deranged stalker. She lost her virginity to David at the end of her senior year of college. She has had continued difficulty with her domineering mother, Felice, although she was close to her father, John. After college, where she studied fashion design, she opened a boutique with Kelly Taylor. She was in a long-term relationship with Noah Hunter, although it went south because of his drinking and her affair with Wayne. She began taking multiple pills a day after she injured her back in a car accident with David; Noah's brother Josh gave her the pills. In the next episode, Law and Disorder, Noah finds her passed out on her living room floor. She continued running the boutique, Now Wear This, alone after Kelly left to pursue public relations and finally married David in the series finale. Donna's birthday is Christmas Day, and she is allergic to chocolate. In the spin-off 90210 it is revealed that Donna continued as a fashion designer, working internationally after closing her boutique in Los Angeles. Also, it is revealed that Donna and David are getting separated, but he sends her a card saying, "Thinking of you." It is unknown what happens after she leaves.

=== Jim and Cindy Walsh ===
James Eckhouse and Carol Potter played Jim and Cindy Walsh (main, season 1–5; special guests, seasons 6–8), Brandon and Brenda's parents who later moved to Hong Kong when Jim was promoted. During the first five seasons, they were Brenda and Brandon's main source of stability and guidance. They always keep an open door and a place at their table for whoever might need it. The Walshes' house is often used for holidays and celebrations (like Mel and Jackie's wedding). Down-to-earth Cindy is a loving and sympathetic mother to her children, but also to her children's often-troubled friends, especially Dylan and Kelly. As a couple, they are stable, although not without their issues (Jim and Cindy are both tempted to have extra-marital affairs in season one). Though Jim has a strong sense of morality, he is very committed to his work as an accountant and loyal to his employers—so much that he finds himself at odds with Brandon, who often defends causes important to him, even at the expense of his father's business interests. Jim also serves as Dylan's trust fund manager/business manager off and on, despite rocky relations between the two of them, often over Dylan's relationship with Brenda. They remained a presence on the show with regular guest roles after Season 5 but were not regular characters themselves after a storyline where Jim received a promotion and huge raise in exchange for him and Cindy moving to the firm's offices in Hong Kong.

=== Nat Bussichio ===
Joe E. Tata portrays Nat Bussichio, (main, season 6–10; recurring, season 1–5), a former Hollywood character actor who is Brandon's boss and the owner and operator of the Peach Pit, a 1950s-styled diner where the gang always gathers. He often serves as a moral compass for the gang, particularly after Jim and Cindy Walsh leave the show. He loves the main cast, and often comes to the rescue of the characters. He is also a Little League baseball coach in a poor neighborhood. Initially Nat is a recurring character, but after season 5, he becomes part of the cast. In season 4, it is revealed that Nat has a brother, Joey, who helps Brandon run the Peach Pit while Nat recovers from a heart attack and surgery. Joey and Jim Walsh decide that the Peach Pit should be sold due to Nat's condition, but Brandon protests, knowing it would kill him. The matter is resolved when Dylan buys the Peach Pit, becoming Nat's business partner. During the sixth season, Nat rekindled his romance with his former girlfriend, Joan Diamond, whom he hadn't seen in over two decades. Joan became pregnant, and she and Nat got engaged. She went into labor in the middle of the wedding ceremony and, at the hospital, insisted on completing the marriage vows before going into the delivery room. She gave birth to Nat's only child, a son named Frankie.

Nat also escorted Donna Martin down the aisle at her wedding to David Silver in the series finale. Donna's father, Dr. John Martin, died of a stroke midway through the final season of the series. In 90210, he returns as a recurring character and the boss of Dixon Wilson.

=== Jesse Vasquez ===
Mark Damon Espinoza portrays Jesse Vasquez (main, season 5; recurring, season 4), who first appeared on the show in Season 4, debuting in an episode where he was working as a bartender at a fancy event hosted by the parents of Andrea Zuckerman's then-boyfriend Dan. Jesse and Andrea had romantic sparks immediately and Andrea soon dumped Dan and began going out with Jesse, later becoming pregnant with his child and eventually accepting Jesse's marriage proposal before they welcomed daughter Hannah. In Season 5, Jesse continues to work as a bartender and plan for his legal future, but the marriage runs into problems (some of them related to money and stress, and others to the fact that Jesse is Catholic and Andrea is Jewish and both of them value those faiths and aren't sure how to present them together to their child) and he eventually shocks Andrea by revealing that just as she did, he had a fling with someone else. They reconciled late in the season as Jesse used his background as a Yale University graduate to get Andrea into the college and find a clerkship nearby. Jesse was not seen in the show after that, and in Season 8 Andrea had an angry phone fight with him before later admitting to Brandon that their marriage was broken, and they were beginning the process of divorce.

=== Clare Arnold ===
Kathleen Robertson portrays Clare Arnold (main, season 6–7; recurring, season 4–5), who met the group while she was a senior in high school, and they were college freshman. She stayed through a few middle seasons. She is known for her high IQ and for being the somewhat-wild daughter of a wealthy diplomat and CU chancellor. She first appeared midway through Season 4 when she aggressively, yet unsuccessfully, pursued Brandon while she was still a high school student, and he was in college. In Season 5, she became Kelly and Donna's roommate in the beach apartment and started CU as a college freshman. Clare evolved throughout the show; at first, she was wild-child bad girl, but she eventually matured and became an integral part of the gang. She was romantically involved with David in Season 5 and Steve in Seasons 6 and 7, becoming the first girl to nail Steve's feet to the ground. The two almost moved in together, but the relationship fell apart due to Clare's anger over Steve's mother breaking up with her father (in real life, Robertson informed producers with a few months of filming left in Season 7 that she wouldn't return to the series after it ended, and they responded by making Clare less likable and undermining her relationship with Steve in order to make her departure as non-impactful to the series as they could). Graduating a year early, Clare soon received an offer to attend an exclusive graduate school in France and the couple reluctantly split up for good after their CU graduation. She's only mentioned once after S7 ends, in a Season 8 episode where Steve bluntly tells Brandon that if he had really loved Clare he would have left California and joined her in France after she asked him to do so.

=== Valerie Malone ===
Tiffani-Amber Thiessen plays Valerie Malone, (main, season 5–9; special guest, season 10) an unwholesome and emotionally troubled family friend of the Walshes back in Minnesota. Brenda, Brandon, and Valerie grew up together in Minnesota until she and her parents moved to Buffalo, New York, when she was around ten years old, and she lived there for most of her teenage years. Problems in the Malone family had been escalating for many years, mostly in secret, but it wasn't until Valerie's father was found dead in the bathroom of his home, an apparent suicide via gunshot wound to the head, that the family's issues seemed to come to light. This marked the catalyst that led to Valerie's move to Beverly Hills, where she would live with the Walshes. Valerie came off to the gang as a naïve young woman; however, at the end of the episode in which she first appeared she was seen rolling a joint. She was also seen and talking to a friend (later revealed to be Ginger) over the phone back in Buffalo, about the possibility of getting involved with Steve Sanders for his money, as well as insulting the gang and boasting of her natural-born ability to lie and act more innocent than she actually is. Romantic interest in Valerie came quick, often, and usually all at once, leading to many situations where male members of the series became contentious over their similar affections for her. Valerie became involved with Dylan, then Steve, then Ray, Brandon, David, Noah, and many others during the course of the show, the most meaningful of them being her romance with David Silver. By Season 6, Valerie got into business with David, and they become co-owners of the Peach Pit After Dark. Among the group, only Kelly took an immediate dislike to Valerie when they first met because Kelly quickly became aware that Valerie was not who she appeared to be. While Brandon and the rest of his friends usually gave Valerie the benefit of the doubt, and ultimately remained friends with her (particularly when Valerie ceased her malicious ways or appeared to atone for them), she and Kelly remained constant enemies throughout the entire series, save for a few instances where both women were to be cordial with each other. It was later revealed that prior to coming to Beverly Hills, Valerie's father had sexually assaulted her, and she was forced to kill him in self-defense, and Valerie's mother was going to turn her in to the police before finally telling Valerie she was blameless and begging her to forgive herself. Valerie subsequently joins her mother in Buffalo. Valerie returns as a guest at Donna's bridal shower and wedding in the series finale and appears on good terms with everyone there. She reveals that she is in a committed relationship back in Buffalo and that she and her mother have reconciled after going through therapy together. At the wedding reception, she also gets the last upper hand with Kelly when she relays Matt Durning's request for Kelly to come talk to him while Kelly and Dylan are figuring out their relationship; Kelly asks in an irritated tone what Matt wants and Valerie coolly says "As usual, I'm just the messenger here" and Kelly gets up and walks away from their final interaction as Valerie shares an unrelated laugh with Dylan after asking him if he missed her. Gina Kincaid replaced Valerie at the latter's departure.

=== Ray Pruit ===
Jamie Walters portrays Ray Pruit (main, season 6; recurring, season 5; guest, season 7), a talented musician with a violent temper whom Donna met while she was doing interviews for CUTV. She was dating Griffin at the time but quickly fell for Ray's charm and talent and dumped Griffin for Ray on Halloween. Ray's background—his mother was an alcoholic and his absent father used to abuse her and Ray, leaving them poor when they fled him—led Donna's mother to distrust him and try to break them up. Later on, Ray became increasingly violent towards Donna, culminating with two ugly incidents when he pushed her against a wall in Oregon and knocked her down a flight of stairs in Palm Springs. Donna forgave/overlooked this violence but broke up with him when she learned he cheated on her with Valerie, and Ray nearly attacked her again before Joe Bradley defended her. Ray then filed charges against Joe, but some straight truth from Brandon led Ray to both admit on the stand he was trying to hurt her (and having Joe's charges dismissed) and to apologize to Donna before leaving L.A. to try out his music. Ray returned late in Season 6 when the video company Donna and David were working for assigned them to do his video; Donna was terrified of him, but soon met his new fiancée and learned he was in therapy to deal with his anger issues, and they parted on friendly terms. Ray made one appearance in Season 7, called in by the friends when David had a breakdown in Las Vegas, and was critical of them for not stepping in and helping him during his downward spiral. Walters appears in one episode of BH90210 in a sequence where Donna Martin sees him and goes over to talk to (who she thinks is Ray) but is surprised to see that it's Walters playing himself in the career he moved into when his show business one ended: as an EMT and fireman.

=== Carly Reynolds ===
Hilary Swank portrays Carly Reynolds (main, season 8), who was a waitress and single mom who had some unfriendly first meetings with Steve Sanders (getting angry when he tried to help her son from getting pushed around at a soccer game, and later insulting his bimbo date and getting fired in the process). Later she accepted his help in getting a job at the Peach Pit, and soon after realized he was a nice guy who was good with her son. They began dating and all was well until midway through the season when Carly's father suffered a heart attack in her Montana hometown, and Carly decided she had to leave L.A. to be with him, and thus departed from the series for good. They broke up and Steve was heartsick for a while, but he eventually told Brandon that he had really loved Carly (or Claire, earlier) he would have moved with them to their new locations.

In an interview given shortly after her Best Actress Oscar win for Boys Don't Cry, Swank revealed that she had been fired from the show because the producers didn't think that Carly was connecting with the show's audience.

=== Noah Hunter ===
Vincent Young portrays Noah Hunter (main, season 8–10), who met the gang during their Hawaiian vacation in Season 8. He was originally smitten with Valerie, who liked him but assumed he was a poor boat worker, and he broke things off with her when he found out she was also dating a rich guy. It was later revealed that his family was very wealthy, and he used his money to buy out the PPAD (Peach Pit After Dark) club, around the same time that he began dating Donna. He was not close to his unhappy, workaholic father (Ray Wise), who revealed in the Season 9 premiere that the family-owned company, Hunter Oil & Chemical, was bankrupt resulting from Noah's father's many years of mismanagement and underpayment of federal and corporate income taxes. His father later committed suicide in the next episode, unable to bear the thought of living in poverty or going to prison for income tax evasion. After this, the IRS then confiscated all of his family's assets (including Noah's yacht, his parents' house, cars, bank accounts and his father's entire life insurance policy) and leaving his widowed mother in destitute. Having lost everything (save for the PPAD club), Noah descended into a drunken depression that led to reckless driving charges and other acts which almost cost him Donna's love, before he cleaned himself up and focused on running the PPAD. It was assumed he went to Harvard, but in Season 10 he admitted that his acceptance there was withdrawn after he drove drunk and had a crash where his girlfriend was killed, only escaping jail because of his father's connections. Noah and Donna ended things for good after this, and he resumed heavy drinking until he was kidnapped and nearly killed. He ended the series by committing to AA and falling in love with a troubled young single mom he met there.

=== Janet Sosna ===
Lindsay Price portrays Janet Sosna (main, season 9–10; recurring, season 8), who joined the Beverly Beat as the new editor after her predecessor got married and left without notice. She liked Steve from the start, but he thought she was too conservative, and ignored her on their disastrous first date at West Beverly's 5-year reunion. She ignored Steve's entreaties until they began sleeping together and then turned the Beat into a tabloid, and by later in Season 9 they started seriously dating, even though Janet's conservative Japanese parents cut her off for being with a non-Japanese man. Janet learned she was pregnant in Season 10, and refused to be with Steve at first, but he won her over and she accepted his marriage proposal. Their daughter Madeline was born after a protracted struggle around Thanksgiving, and Steve later brought Janet's parents back into their lives as well. Near the series end, a New York-based investor bought out the Beat for $750,000, with Steve stepping away while Janet took on editorial duties that left her exhausted and away from her family; she happily agreed to Steve's plan that they would take their windfall and use it to create and jointly run a new publication.

=== Matt Durning ===
Daniel Cosgrove portrays Matt Durning (main, season 9–10), an attorney who became the group's legal jack of all trades, working on everything from criminal defense to libel and contract law (which was ridiculous, but the show rolled with it). Although he and Donna were interested in each other while she was disgusted with Noah's behavior, their reunion turned his attention toward Kelly, and they began sleeping together as she got over Brandon's departure. Matt had a secret, though: his wife had been in an institution in New York due to severe schizophrenia, and later found medication that helped her enough that she could head to L.A. to be with him. Kelly broke up with him but after learning that the medication had side effects that would have killed her, Matt's wife accepted re-institutionalization and signed divorce papers so he could move on with his life. He and Kelly then reunited, but Matt was thrown at first by Kelly's one-night stand with Dylan (when they went to Mexico to illegally buy drugs that would have temporarlity helped Matt's then-wife) and then by not knowing at first that Kelly was raped. He got a weapons charge against her dismissed after she shot and killed the rapist in self-defense using a gun that Dylan helped her purchase on the black market, and they drifted apart for a while, until Matt's handling of a death penalty appeal helped bring them back together. Matt and Dylan had a mostly unfriendly rivalry over their shared love for Kelly, with Matt successfully proposing to Kelly, but also having serious professional difficulties. Matt planned to move to Seattle as the series ended, but when his brother died in a car crash (Matt had provided a sperm sample so his infertile brother and his wife could have a child through artificial insemination), Matt moved to New York instead, breaking up with Kelly on civil terms, and admitting that he saw the bond between her and Dylan was real.

=== Gina Kincaid ===
Vanessa Marcil portrays Gina Kincaid (main, season 9–10), a former ice-skating champion with a bad attitude and an unfairly traumatic past who got fired from her ice show position and stayed with her cousin Donna. Gina's manipulative ways made her Kelly's new post-Valerie enemy, and drove a wedge between Donna and Noah, as well. Gina and Dylan soon began a sexual relationship, but Dylan's attentions toward Kelly made Gina angry and bereft. Gina was resentful of Donna because of the Martins' wealth, while she grew up poor with a mean-spirited, bullying stage mother. She also suffered from bulimia and bonded with David Silver over his efforts to help her through her problems. They dated briefly after Gina had enough of Dylan treating her like an ornament, but David ended things with her because she was still hung up on Dylan. The character seemed to bounce between being treated badly by people for valid reasons (Donna due to her fake fling with Noah and later her cruel comments on Kelly's self-defense shooting, the ice show manager she was rude to) and being treated badly for no valid reason (preppy snobs in a bar who insulted her, Oksana Baiul's rude manager, and even Noah when he blamed her for a mistake the bakery made with Donna's birthday cake). She was stunned to learn that Donna's father was actually her father as well, having had a drunken fling with her mother that was covered up. Dr. Martin tried to bond with her, and they were making progress, until he died of a stroke that everyone blamed Gina for. She planned to leave town with Dylan, before her strong words at the funeral led to her finally being accepted by Donna and Felice, and she was neither surprised nor very hurt when Dylan bailed on their travel plans. It was later revealed that Gina had found new professional success after leaving L.A., working as a skating commentator. In real life, Marcil hated working on the show and asked Aaron Spelling to let her out of her contract early. He agreed, and the storyline involving her real parentage was hastily concocted to give Gina an exit arc.

== Other characters ==
=== Jackie Taylor ===
Ann Gillespie plays Jackie Taylor, Kelly's mother (recurring, season 1–10). A former model, married multiple times, appeared occasionally during the series entire run in every season. During the first season of the show, Jackie was addicted to drugs and alcohol, which led to her making a scene at the mother/daughter fashion show. Jackie then entered rehab and remained clean throughout the rest of the series. She married David's father, Mel, in the second season and had a baby girl, Erin, with him. They divorced when Mel was caught cheating, but later got back together and broke up again. Kelly sometimes found her to be overbearing. Jackie continued to make appearances throughout all 10 seasons of the show. She also guest-starred in two first-season episodes of the spin-off series 90210, which features Erin as a regular character. It was revealed that Jackie was again abusing alcohol, and Kelly steps in to take Erin away from her. She returns in season two of the spinoff with a lot more serious storylines than the first season. It was later revealed that she had been diagnosed with breast cancer and had three months to live. She managed to come to peace with both her daughters before her death. Jackie Taylor appeared in 55 episodes.

=== Emily Valentine ===
Christine Elise plays Emily Valentine (recurring, season 2; guest, season 4 and 5), a troubled newcomer to West Beverly who appeared during the first half of Season 2. She became romantically involved with Brandon. She drugged Brandon with a drug called euphoria (4-methylaminorex) at a rave, although the effects were much more akin to MDMA. She spent time at a mental hospital after threatening to torch herself, along with a parade float, and writing threatening letters to West Beverly and leaving obscene phone messages on the Walshes' answering machine. She met up with Brandon years later while she was living in San Francisco during Season 4, before moving to study marine biology in France. She briefly returned during Season 5 and almost had an affair with Brandon on the same night Kelly Taylor was burned in a fire. Emily Valentine appeared in 12 episodes.

=== Nikki Witt ===
Brandon resists Nikki's advances in vain. (Dana Barron and Jason Priestley in "A Song of Myself".)

Dana Barron plays Nikki Witt (recurring, season 3), Brandon's younger girlfriend during his senior year in high school in Season 3. She flirted with David while Donna was in Paris, until she learned he had a girlfriend. Nikki later became friends with the group, due to being partnered with Donna for the Senior Buddy project. She wore down Brandon's defenses, then began dating him. She was almost raped by an ex-boyfriend, and Brandon came to her aid. She moved back to San Francisco after reconciling with her parents, thus ending her relationship with Brandon (Like many of the cast, Barron was considerably older than the character she was portraying). Nikki Witt appeared in nine episodes.

=== Stuart Carson ===
David Gail plays Stuart Carson (recurring, season 4), Brenda's wealthy, 20-something suitor shortly after starting college in Season 4. He proposes to Brenda after knowing her for a short time, and they almost wed in Las Vegas before coming to their senses. Brenda later breaks up with him when she realizes that Stuart is a negative person who cares more about impressing his overbearing father than doing what is right or treating her nicely. After the breakup, she tells Dylan she's still in love with him. In season 1, Gail portrayed Tom, a bellhop working at a Palm Springs hotel who helps Brenda find a place to sleep after she gets lost. Stuart Carson appeared in seven episodes.

=== D' Shawn Hardell ===
Played by Cress Williams (recurring, season 4–5), D'Shawn is a talented basketball player for CU. Brandon's sociology professor asks Brandon to tutor him so he can make grades and play basketball. D'Shawn is friends with the gang. He keeps Brandon's affair with Lucinda a secret and they later become friends after he studies and earns his own grades. In season 5, he votes for Brandon as student body president and helps Donna Martin over her decision to become a debutante. D'Shawn Hardell appeared in 13 episodes.

=== John Sears ===
Paul Johansson plays John Sears (recurring, season 4), who is introduced as a student of California University, where he, Steve Sanders, and several others shared a prestigious fraternity, KEG House. John Sears is a minor antagonist and nemesis to Dylan Mckay and Steve Sanders. John had known Kelly Taylor before she enrolled into California University and began romancing her as they became reacquainted. Kelly's feelings for John led her to separate from her boyfriend Dylan, stating that she no longer wanted to go steady. However, Kelly eventually found out that John only wanted to sleep with her. He almost immediately took a disliking to Steve and tried to get him kicked out of the fraternity by setting him up to be caught during an initiation prank, but Sears stupidly told the KEG President he had set Steve up, and after this was revealed prior to a "vote out" Sears was ousted by a wide margin. At the end of the semester, John and Steve met again at a carnival, engaging in a joust match over a mud pit. At the carnival, Steve finds out that John is dating Steve's ex-girlfriend, Celeste Lundy. Celeste, Brenda and Donna then assist Steve in humiliating John. Celeste then breaks up with John and reunites with Steve. John Sears appeared in 13 episodes.

=== Joe Bradley ===
Cameron Bancroft plays Joe Bradley (recurring, season 6), an all-star quarterback at California University introduced in Season 6. He came to Donna's aid after Ray became abusive to her. He had surgery for a heart condition and ended up leaving the football team; dated Donna and had no problem with her vow of celibacy, but his plan to move to his Pennsylvania hometown and coach football after asking Donna to marry him wasn't what she was looking for, and they cordially parted ways. Joe Bradley appeared in 23 episodes.

=== Antonia "Toni" Marchette ===
Rebecca Gayheart plays Antonia "Toni" Elizabeth Marchette (recurring, season 6), daughter of Dylan's father's supposed killer, mobster Tony Marchette introduced in Season 6. She became romantically involved with, and eventually married to, Dylan, after he initially tried to use her to get to her father. He later truly fell in love with her. She was accidentally killed by a hitman who was hired by her father to kill Dylan the day after their wedding. Toni Marchette appeared in eight episodes.

=== Colin Robbins ===
Jason Wiles plays Colin Robbins (also starring, season 6), a New York artist who meets Kelly when she's doing modeling work in New York between Season 5 & 6. He moved to L.A. to begin a relationship with her and was also an old boyfriend of Valerie's. Colin's lifestyle is secretly supported by a female gallery owner in exchange for physical favors. He has a cocaine problem and drags Kelly (who initially kept trying to blame Valerie for his addiction) down into cocaine usage before she goes to rehab and breaks up with him. He reluctantly drives his drug dealer to a buy and gets arrested when he flees the scene and leads the LAPD on a wild chase through the streets of L.A. Valerie begins a romantic relationship with him and puts up her and Nat's assets to secure his bail. But a lenient plea deal that would have sent Colin to a minimum-security prison for a short time is rejected by a stern judge, who sentences him instead to at least 2 years in a much rougher prison on endangerment and obstruction charges. Colin jumps bail and nearly gets away, but the combined efforts of Brandon, Kelly, Valerie, and a helpful FBI agent lead to his rearrest. A financially saved Valerie cuts all ties with him and he's led off in shame to face a nightmare in prison. Colin Robbins appeared in all 32 episodes in season 6.

=== Susan Keats ===
Emma Caulfield portrayed Susan Keats (recurring, season 6), editor of the college paper (The CU Condor), self-proclaimed feminist, and love interest of Brandon in Season 6; was impregnated by ex-boyfriend Jonathan Caston, had an abortion, and later won an award for her article on the right to choose. She moved to Washington, D.C., to work on the Clinton/Gore presidential campaign. Brandon broke up with her because she insisted, he pass up a prestigious internship in Boston to travel for the summer with her, while she accepted the campaign job. Susan Keats appeared in 30 episodes.

=== Tracy Gaylian ===
Jill Novick plays Tracy Gaylian (recurring, season 7; guest, season 8), a news anchor for the TV station at CU. She dated Brandon for most of Season 7, but Brandon broke up with her when he realized his true feelings for Kelly. She later met up with the gang during their trip to Hawaii and they learned that she is happy, engaged, and has no ill feelings toward Brandon or Kelly. Tracy Gaylian appeared in 22 episodes.

=== Yvonne Teasley ===
Denise Dowse plays Yvonne Teasley (recurring, 2–10), a vice principal of West Beverly Hills High School. She was strict, but compassionate, and became a respected administrator among the students who interacted with her most often.

=== Camille Desmond ===
Josie Davis plays Camille Desmond (recurring, season 10), David's final girlfriend before he realized his true feelings for Donna in Season 10. Camille worked as a fashion magazine writer, and later worked for Donna at the boutique. When David told Camille his true feelings about Donna, Camille sold her share of the boutique to Donna so that she wouldn't have to face the torment of seeing David and Donna together again. Camille Desmond appeared in 10 episodes.

=== Dr. John and Felice Martin ===
Michael Durrell & Katherine Cannon played John & Felice Martin (recurring, season 2–10), Donna's parents who generally personified wealthy, conservative, social-climbing Beverly Hills socialites and appeared occasionally through the series entire run. Felice tried to appear moral and strait-laced (she even supported West Beverly's decision to suspend her daughter prior to graduation after Donna got drunk at the prom) but she was often hypocritical: she had an affair that nearly ended her marriage and had to admit that her own insistence in premarital celibacy was a lie because she's gotten pregnant and had an abortion while in college. Overprotective and controlling, she often tried to sabotage Donna's relationships with David, Ray, and Noah. However, John, an experienced heart surgeon and a more even-keeled individual than Felice, was generally more accepting of Donna's life choices and offered her his support. John is usually the straight man next to Felice's antics. During the seventh season, John suffers a stroke, which Donna initially blames on David (who was present because he was getting advice on how to win over Felice), but she realizes that he wasn't responsible. Following the stroke, the Martins' marriage deteriorates to the point where John asks for a separation from Felice, but he reconsiders after talking with Noah at Donna's request. They both lied about John being Gina Kincaid's real father and covered it up out of embarrassment, only admitting the truth when Donna found out and angrily shamed them into being honest. John dies of another stroke just as Gina was ready to start bonding with him, which Felice blamed her for, but later accepts her in the family after helping Donna finish the eulogy at his funeral. She later sets Donna up with David, having finally accepted their relationship and watched them get married at the end of the series. John Martin appeared in 30 episodes, while Felice Martin appears in 41 episodes.

=== Abby Malone ===
Michelle Phillips plays Abby Malone (recurring, season 7–9), who is Valerie's mother, from whom Valerie is estranged after her father Victor dies. She was friends with Jim and Cindy Walsh before the Malone family moved to Buffalo. She almost ends up marrying Kelly's father Bill but is left at the altar. Valerie later breaks up her mother's relationship with a cop to punish her for not stopping her father from molesting her. At first, Abby denies knowing that Valerie was molested by her father, but later admits that she knew and that he had promised to get help, not seeming that concerned that he lied to her and continued to sexually assault Valerie. She initially blames Valerie for her husband's death and threatens to turn her in after Val confesses to killing him (in self-defense, while he was trying to strangle her after she told him she was turning him in the police). When she decides not to turn Valerie in for the murder, she horrifies her daughter by stating she doesn't forgive her, wishes that she was "strong enough" to go to the police, basically claims that Valerie was dating her father rather than being raped by him, and just wants to keep the secret while making it clear she would be justified to have Valerie arrested whenever she wanted. Valerie says that she's sick of her mom's pathology and will get closure her own way. Abby finally both realizes that this means that Valerie is going to just turn HERSELF in and that she enabled and lied for her rapist husband Victor; she stops Valerie at the nearest LAPD station and tells her both that she failed and that she fully forgives her daughter, begging Valerie to forgive herself for horrors that were not her fault. Valerie tells the group in the series finale that Abby has joined her for therapy to deal with Victor's actions and their relationship is now much better and stronger than before. Abby Malone appeared in nine episodes.

=== Gil Meyers ===
Mark Kiely plays Gil Meyers (recurring, season 3; guest, season 4 and 5), an AP English teacher and journalism advisor during the gang's senior year at West Beverly in Season 3. He becomes friends with Andrea, Brandon, and Dylan. Andrea accuses him of sexism when he decides Brandon should be editor-in-chief of the Blaze. They later make peace when Andrea and Brandon become co-editors of the paper. Sue Scanlon accuses him of molesting her, but she later reveals that Gil is innocent and that her uncle is the molester. He made a deal with Andrea if she gets accepted to Yale University he would shave his beard. Andrea got accepted and he shaved his beard. Andrea reveals she has a crush on him at the beginning of the fourth season but never tells him once she sees he has a girlfriend. He is last seen during Andrea's farewell party at the end of the fifth season. At the time, he reveals that he now has a child. Gil Meyers appeared in 13 episodes.

=== Lucinda Nicholson ===
Dina Meyer plays Lucinda Nicholson (recurring, season 4), who was a sexually aggressive and married university anthropology professor who became romantically involved with Brandon Walsh—a student at her school. In time, she also shared a kiss with Dylan McKay, who later suspected that she merely wanted to seduce him in order for him to fund a movie project of hers. Eventually, certain brash actions on her part met with disapproval from Brandon, who calmly ended the relationship. Her husband, Corey, took their divorce badly, and attempted to take it out on Brandon, and later on Steve Sanders, who tried to pass off an essay of Brandon's as his own. He failed both times and was fired after his attempt to get Steve and Brandon thrown out of California University. Lucinda Nicholson appeared in 13 episodes.

=== Other characters' parents ===
Kelly's absent father Bill (John Reilly) was shown occasionally at events, such as high school graduation. He was arrested for embezzlement at Kelly's lavish college graduation party, which he threw for her. He almost married Valerie's mother Abby, but stood her up at the altar. David's unfaithful father Mel (Matthew Laurance) was shown in the middle of the series when he married and divorced Jackie Taylor, then lived with her again until Gina blew the whistle on Mel's unfaithfulness, causing Jackie to tell him they're finished for good. David's mother Sheila (Caroline Lagerfelt) was shown as sweet and loving, but has bipolar disorder. She attempted suicide, and she later would come to David's aid when he is hospitalized. Dylan's father, Jack McKay (Josh Taylor) had a brief run after being released from prison but was then apparently killed, only to later reappear after secretly being enrolled in the Witness Protection Program. Dylan's negligent New Age-following mother Iris (Stephanie Beacham) occasionally appears, but lives in Hawaii. Steve's adoptive mother Samantha (Christine Belford) is an actress and the former star of the Hartley House TV program; she later comes out as a lesbian. Steve's father Rush (Jed Allan) is shown as an abrasive, overbearing, but doting, and ultimately caring parent. Although it was thought for years that he was his adoptive father, Steve learns that Rush is indeed his biological father.
