= Shannen Doherty filmography =

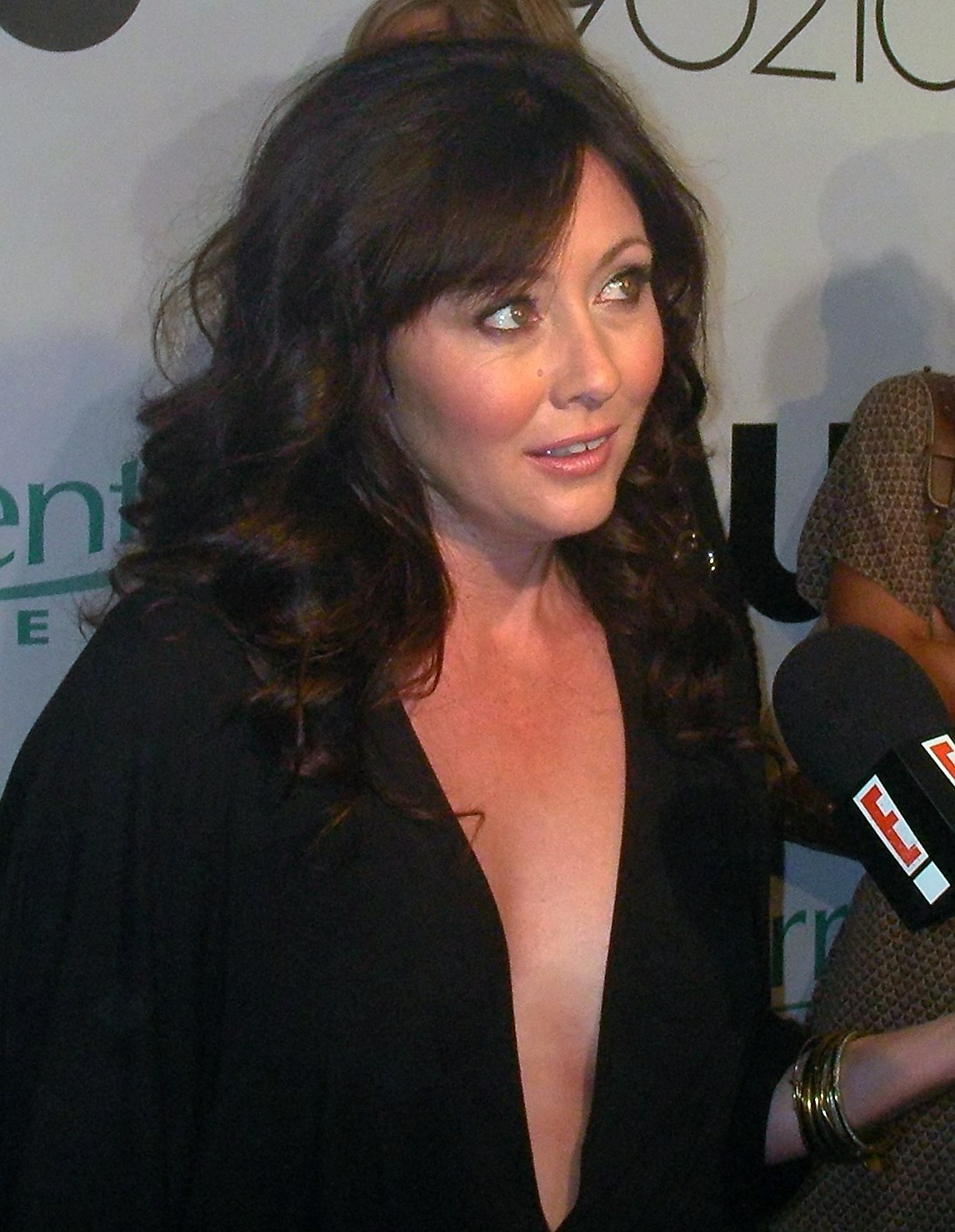
Doherty attending the premiere of 90210 in 2008

American actress Shannen Doherty (1971–2024) appeared in numerous television programs and motion pictures. After her television debut in Father Murphy in 1981, she landed her first major role in the dramatic western television series Little House on the Prairie (1982–1983), and reprised her role in its three television specials. Doherty received two Young Artist Award nominations for playing the oldest Witherspoon sibling Kris in the family drama Our House (1986–1988). She appeared in four films during the 1980s, including the positively-received, animated film The Secret of NIMH (1982) and the cult classic Heathers (1988). Her breakthrough role was as Brenda Walsh in the teen drama Beverly Hills, 90210 (1990–1994), but she was later dropped from the series because of backstage issues and her negative image as a "bad girl". She starred in television films in the early and mid-1990s, and played Rene Mosier in the romantic comedy Mallrats (1995) in an attempt to rebuild her career.

Doherty enjoyed a resurgence in popularity after being cast by producer Aaron Spelling to play Prue Halliwell on the supernatural drama Charmed (1998–2001). The series was their second collaboration following Beverly Hills, 90210. The character was praised by critics and fans, earning a spot as one of the best witches in television history according to a TVLine article, and Doherty took an active role in the show's production, directing three of its episodes. Following disagreements with Spelling and co-star Alyssa Milano, Doherty left the series in its third season. Doherty starred in a string of television films and had a recurring role on the prime-time soap opera North Shore (2004–2005). The following year, she was cast as Denise Johnson in the unaired pilot of the sitcom Love, Inc., but was dropped from the show by producers from United Paramount Network (UPN). She reprised her role as Brenda Walsh in the reboot of 90210 (2008–2009), appearing as a special guest star in seven episodes in its first season.

While acting in scripted material, Doherty also participated in five reality television shows, none of which had much success, except Shannen Says (2012), in which she received positive reviews. In 2010, Doherty competed in the tenth season of Dancing with the Stars to honor her father who had a stroke in December 2009. Later that year, she also voiced the identical twins Mari and Kari on the animated web series Mari-Kari, and starred in the independent satirical thriller Burning Palms after a nine-year absence from film. In 2012 and 2014, she directed two music videos for the band Radical Something. She starred alongside Alec Baldwin, Danny Glover, and Michael Madsen in the 2016 sports drama film Back in the Day. In 2018, she appeared in a television series based on Heathers and the television movie No One Would Tell, a remake of the 1996 film of the same name. The following year, she portrayed a heightened version of herself for BH90210, and guest-starred on Riverdale as part of a tribute to Luke Perry, who died in 2019. Doherty appeared in two action films Fortress (2021) and Hot Seat (2022), as well as two television films, Dying to Belong and List of a Lifetime, in 2021.

== Film ==
Key
†	Denotes films that have not yet been released

Year	Title	Role	Notes	Ref.
1982	The Secret of NIMH	Teresa Brisby (voice)		
1982	Night Shift	Bluebird		
1985	Girls Just Want to Have Fun	Maggie Malene		
1989	Heathers	Heather Duke		
1994	Almost Dead	Katherine Roshak		
1994	Naked Gun 33 ^{1}/_{3}: The Final Insult	Herself	Cameo	
1995	Mallrats	Rene Mosier		
1997	Nowhere	Val-Chick 2	Cameo	
1999	Striking Poses	Gage Sullivan		
2001	Jay and Silent Bob Strike Back	Herself	Cameo	
2010	Burning Palms	Dr. Shelly		
2016	Back in the Day	Maria		
2017	Bethany	Susan	Producer	
2019	Undateable John	Charlene		
2021	Fortress	Brigadier General Barbara Dobbs		
2022	Hot Seat	Police Chief Pam Connelly		
2024	Darkness of Man	Vivian		
TBA	How to Make a Deal with the Devil †	The Devil	Completed; posthumous release	
TBA	Bukowski †	Young Katherina Bukowski	In post-production; posthumous release	

== Television ==
Year	Title	Role	Notes	Ref.
1981	Father Murphy	Drusilla Shannon	Episodes: "By the Bear That Bit Me" (Parts 1 & 2)	
1982	The Phoenix	Little Girl (uncredited)	Episode: "One of Them"	
1982	Voyagers!	Betty Parris	Episode: "Agents of Satan"	
1982–1983	Little House on the Prairie	Jenny Wilder	Main role (18 episodes)	
1983	Little House: Look Back to Yesterday	Jenny Wilder	Television film	
1983	Magnum, P.I.	Ima Platt	Episode: "A Sense of Debt"	
1984	Airwolf	Phoebe Danner	Episode: "Bite of the Jackal"	
1984	Little House: The Last Farewell	Jenny Wilder	Television film	
1984	Little House: Bless All The Dear Children	Jenny Wilder	Television film	
1985	Robert Kennedy and His Times	Kathleen Kennedy	Miniseries (Parts 1 & 2)	
1985	The New Leave It to Beaver	Laurie	Episode: "Steppin' Out"	
1985	The Other Lover	Alson Fielding	Television film	
1985	Highway to Heaven	Shelley Fowler	Episode: "The Secret"	
1986–1988	Our House	Kris Witherspoon	Main role	
1987	Alf Loves a Mystery	The Lady in Red	Television film	
1989	21 Jump Street	Janine	Episode: "Things We Said Today"	
1990	Life Goes On	Ginny Green	Episode: "Corky's Crush"	
1990–1994	Beverly Hills, 90210	Brenda Walsh	Main role Soundtrack, Episode: "Wild Fire" (uncredited)	
1991	Forever Young	Party Girl	Television film	
1992	The Secret of Lost Creek	Jeannie Fogle	Main role	
1992	Obsessed	Lorie Brindel	Television film	
1993	Freeze Frame	Lindsay Scott	Television film	
1993	Saturday Night Live	Herself/host	Episode: "Shannen Doherty/Cypress Hill"	
1994	Blindfold: Acts of Obsession	Madeleine Dalton	Television film	
1994	A Burning Passion: The Margaret Mitchell Story	Margaret Mitchell	Television film	
1994	Jailbreakers	Angel Norton	Television film	
1996	Gone in the Night	Cyndi Dowaliby	Television film	
1997	Friends 'Til the End	Heather Romley	Television film	
1997	Sleeping with the Devil	Rebecca Dubrovich	Television film	
1997	The Ticket	CeeCee Reicker	Television film	
1998–2001	Charmed	Prue Halliwell	Main role Director (3 episodes); Choreographer (Episode: "Coyote Piper"); Very special thanks (Episode: "Something Wicca This Way Goes...?")	
2000	Satan's School for Girls	Beth Hammersmith/Karen Oxford	Television film	
2001	Another Day	Kate	Television film; also Co-executive producer	
2002	The Rendering	Sarah Reynolds	Television film	
2002	Hell on Heels: The Battle of Mary Kay	Lexi Wilcox	Television film	
2003	Nightlight	Celeste Timmerman	Television film/Also known as View of Terror	
2003	Scare Tactics	Herself	Host (season 1)	
2004–2005	North Shore	Alexandra Hudson	Recurring role	
2005	Category 7: The End of the World	Faith Clavell	Television film	
2005	Love, Inc.	Denise Johnson	Unaired pilot	
2006	Breaking Up with Shannen Doherty	Herself	Host; also Executive producer, Writer (2 episodes)	
2007	Christmas Caper	Kate Dove	Television film	
2008	Kiss Me Deadly	Marta	Television film	
2008	The Lost Treasure of the Grand Canyon	Susan Jordan	Television film	
2008	Defunct	Fanny Thornton	Television film	
2008–2009	90210	Brenda Walsh	Special guest star (season 1; recurring)	
2009	Encounter with Danger	Lori	Television film	
2010	Dancing with the Stars	Herself	Contestant; Season 10 (Voted off in Week 2)	
2010	Growing the Big One	Emma Silber	Television film Soundtrack, "The Yankee Doodle Boy" (uncredited)	
2010	The Spin Crowd	Herself	Episode: "Should I Stay or Should I Go?"	
2011	Les Anges de la téléréalité	Herself	Season 3: I Love New York	
2012	Witchslayer Gretl	Gretl	Television film	
2012	Shannen Says	Herself	Main role; also Executive producer	
2012	The New Normal	Brenda Walsh/herself	Episode: "The XY Factor"	
2014	All I Want for Christmas	Brenda Patterson	Television film	
2014	Blood Lake: Attack of the Killer Lampreys	Cate Parker	Television film	
2015	Off the Map with Shannen & Holly	Herself	Main role; also Executive producer	
2016	Rock in a Hard Place	Janice	Cable pilot (Indiegogo campaign)	
2018	No One Would Tell	Laura Collins	Television film	
2018	Heathers	Mrs. Dean/Dr. Destiny	4 episodes	
2019	BH90210	Herself/Brenda Walsh	Co-producer; 6 episodes	
2019	Riverdale	Stranded Motorist	Episode: "Chapter Fifty-Eight: In Memoriam"	
2021	Dying to Belong	Katherine	Television film	
2021	List of a Lifetime	Diana Carroll	Television film	

== Web ==
Year	Title	Role	Notes	Ref.
2010	Mari-Kari	Mari/Kari (voice)		
2011	Suite 7	Adrienne	Episode: "Company"; Director ("Captive Audience"); Producer ("Captive Audience" and "Company")	
2012	"Naked in Venice"	Director; Producer	Music video for Radical Something	
2014	"Pure"	Director; Producer	Music video for Radical Something	
2023–2024	Let's Be Clear with Shannen Doherty	Podcaster	Podcast	
2024	House of Halliwell	Podcaster	Podcast	

== Music video appearances ==
Year	Title	Artist	Ref.
1992	"Real Love"	Slaughter	
2014	"Unicorn Zombie Apocalypse	Borgore & Sikdope	
