= Shannen Says =

2012 American reality television series

- Title card
- Genre: Reality television
- Starring: Shannen Doherty; Kurt Iswarienko
- Country of origin: United States
- Original language: English
- No. of seasons: 1
- No. of episodes: 8

Production
- Executive producers: Kathleen Farrell; Tom Forman; Russell Heldt; Shannen Doherty; Kurt Iswarienko
- Running time: 42–43 minutes
- Production companies: No Apologies Productions; RelativityReal

Original release
- Network: WE TV
- Release: April 10 – May 13, 2012

Shannen Says is an eight-episode American reality television series broadcast on WE TV from April 10 to May 13, 2012. The show focuses on the preparations for the 2011 wedding of actress Shannen Doherty and photographer Kurt Iswarienko, with help from celebrity-wedding planner David Tutera. Doherty and Iswarienko developed the show as a way to document the stress on a couple while planning their wedding.

Filmed in Malibu, California, between August 2011 and October 2011, Shannen Says was produced by RelativityReal and Doherty's production company No Apologies Productions. To prepare for filming, Doherty watched reality shows by Tori Spelling and Kim Kardashian. The series was released on the iTunes Store and Amazon Video under the title Shannen Says, Season 1, but it was not made available on DVD or Blu-ray.

Shannen Says had low viewership and ranked below most other programs when it premiered, but had some popularity among women between the ages of 25 and 54. Doherty said it was intended as a one-off, with no plans for a second season. Shannen Says and Doherty received mixed reviews.

== Production ==
=== Concept and development ===
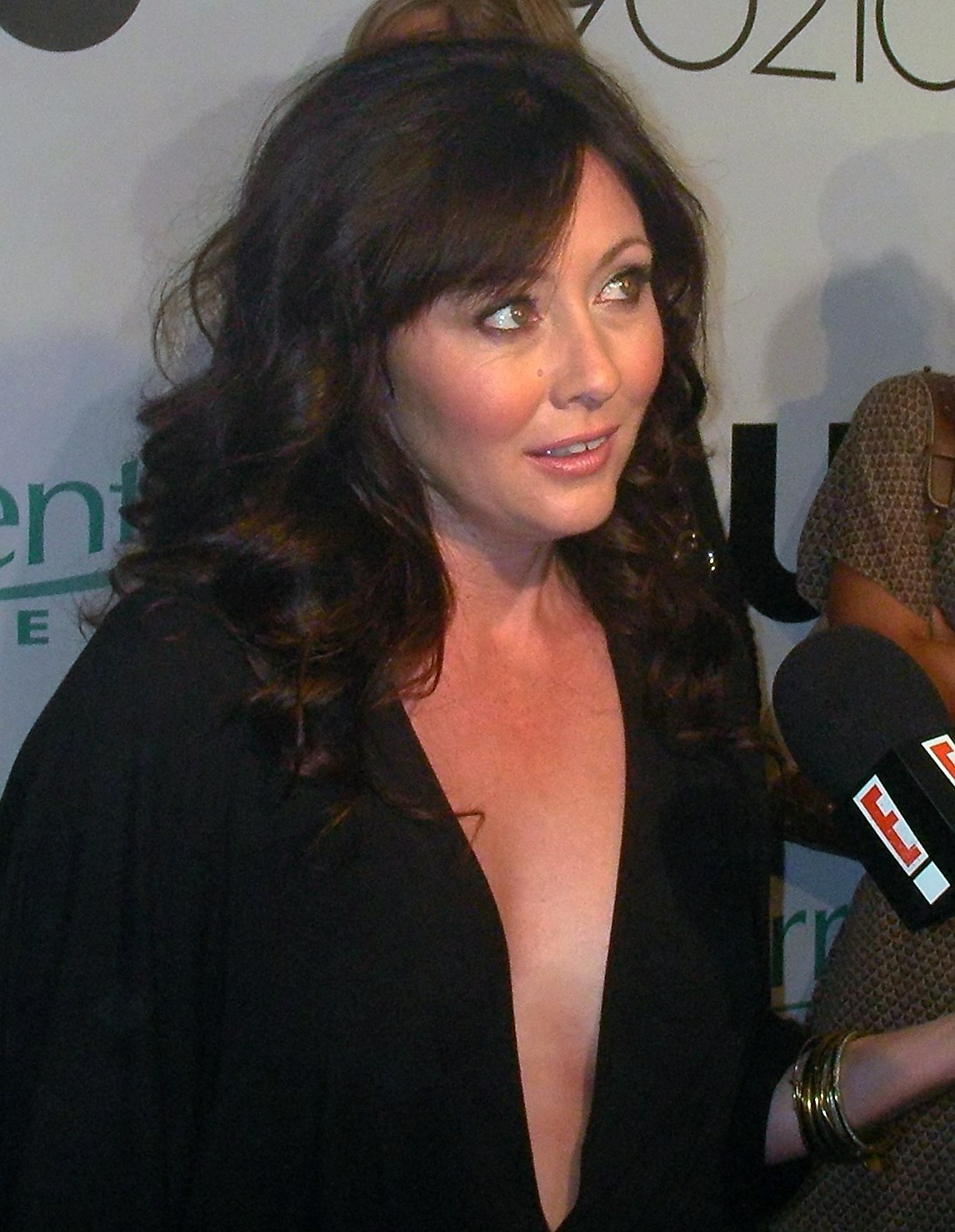
Shannen Says is about the wedding of Shannen Doherty (pictured in 2008) and Kurt Iswarienko.

Shannen Says documents the events leading up to Shannen Doherty's wedding to Kurt Iswarienko. It was Doherty's third wedding; she previously married actor Ashley Hamilton and poker player Rick Salomon, these marriages ended in 1994 and 2003, respectively. Doherty previously worked on reality television as a host for Scare Tactics and Breaking Up with Shannen Doherty and as a contestant on the tenth season of Dancing with the Stars. Developed under the working title The Shannen Doherty Project, Shannen Says was first announced by WE TV on July 20, 2011. According to the network, the show was intended to portray Doherty from a more intimate perspective.

WE TV senior vice president John Miller identified the series as part of the network's strategy to "present stories that showcase the wild ride of modern-day life from a woman's perspective". Prior to Shannen Says, WE TV was already associated with wedding-themed shows, such as Bridezillas and My Fair Wedding with David Tutera. Variety's Jill Goldsmith cited it, alongside Braxton Family Values, Joan & Melissa: Joan Knows Best?, and Mary Mary, to discuss WE TV's focus on celebrity-based reality shows.

Shannen Says was initially going to be developed by Doherty's production company, No Apologies Productions, to air on another television network. The series was instead picked up by WE TV after Doherty rejected the previous network for making the material too sensational. Miller approved the show's pitch because he believed Doherty was "unfiltered, honest and vulnerable" and said: "I would watch her go to a supermarket ... She's insanely compelling." Doherty referred to Shannen Says as her agreement with Iswarienko to "chronicle this time in our lives and let future brides and future grooms know that [it's] not just you [who] goes through the stress". Likening the show to a wedding video, she described it as a documentary rather than a reality show, and saw herself as an actor not a reality personality.

=== Filming and cast ===
Doherty and Iswarienko were inspired by the filming and production styles in Anthony Bourdain: No Reservations and Deadliest Catch. Doherty questioned if a show could be "brutally honest, that completely raw, but with the quality of those two shows where you do use different cameras and you do want it to look spectacular". They purchased an expensive new camera to film the series since they wanted it to be "a cut above the rest as far as our crew and how it looks". Doherty intended for Shannen Says to provide a more authentic look into her life, in contrast to her public persona and acting roles. This idea was carried over into the show's opening ("Everyone thinks they know you"), which she wrote. She viewed the filming techniques as an important part of this goal, saying: "It had to be honest, it had to be truthful, and it had to look fantastic."

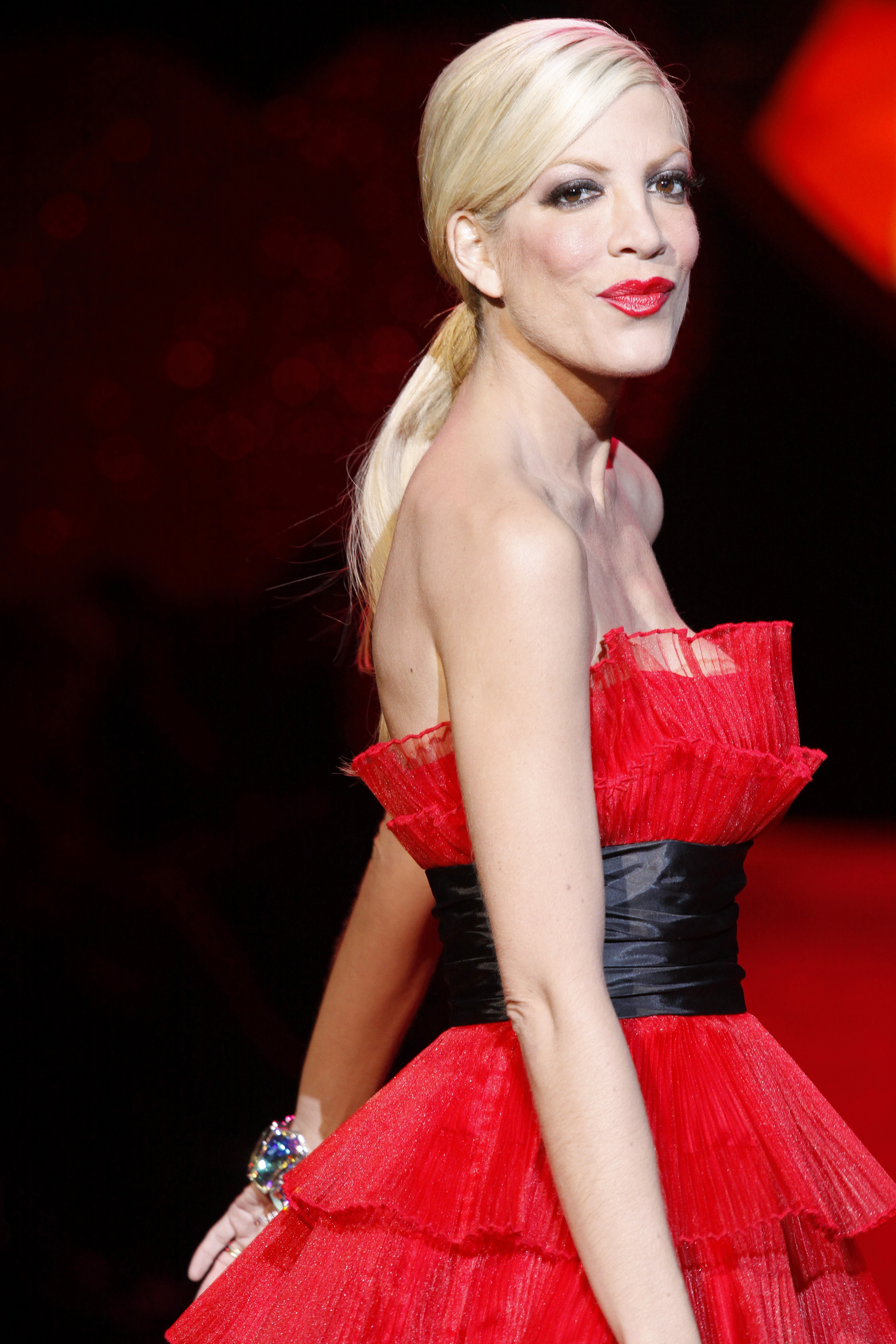
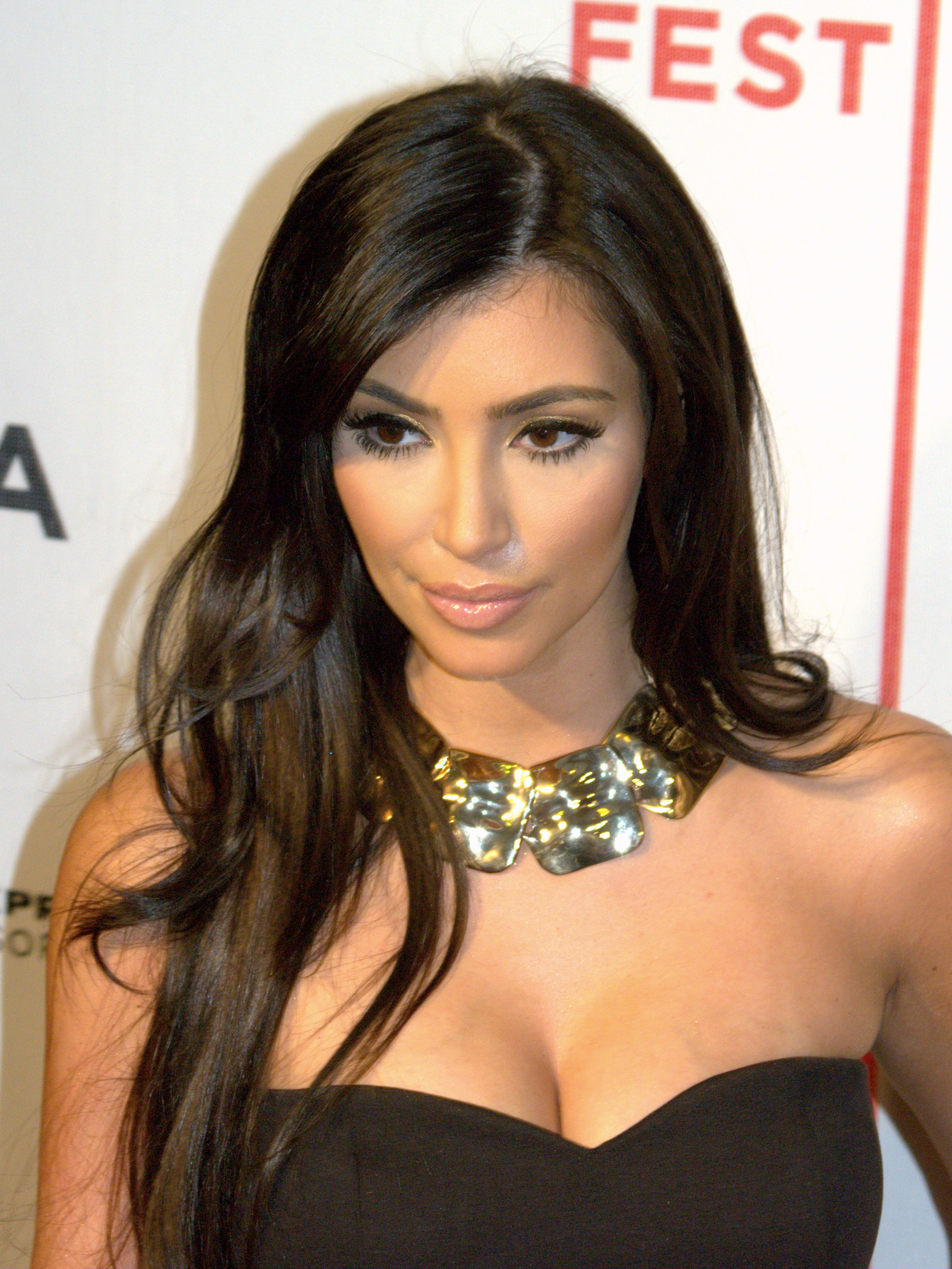
Doherty watched reality shows by Tori Spelling and Kim Kardashian (pictured left to right, both in 2009) in preparation for Shannen Says.

The series was produced by No Apologies Productions and RelativityReal. Episodes were filmed over a seven-week period at the couple's home in Malibu, California, and nearby locations. Production began in August 2011, and the wedding took place and was filmed on October 15, 2011. Pictures from the wedding were published in the November 2, 2011, issue of Us Weekly. Doherty and Iswarienko were executive producers for the series, along with Kathleen Iswarienko, Russell Heldt, and Tom Forman. Initially concerned about the lack of privacy during filming, Doherty felt more comfortable when the bedroom was set as off-limits for the show. To prepare for filming, Doherty watched Keeping Up with the Kardashians and former Beverly Hills, 90210 co-star Tori Spelling's reality show about her relationship with husband Dean McDermott. Despite this, she resisted comparisons to Kim Kardashian's publicized wedding to and divorce from basketball player Kris Humphries.

David Tutera, a wedding planner and host of My Fair Wedding with David Tutera, acted as Doherty's event planner. The series also featured Doherty's friends, Roxana Zal, Tim Bitici, and Roger Castillo and her mother, Rosa. Professional dancer Louis Van Amstel and real estate agent Chris Cortazzo guest-starred in one episode. Doherty said Twitter users enjoyed how her mother chose to appear more natural rather than being styled by the show's crew.

== Episodes ==
No.	Title	Original release date	US viewers (millions)
1	"Rules of Engagement"	April 10, 2012	N/A
Doherty and Iswarienko hire celebrity-event planner David Tutera for their wedding.
2	"Location, Location, Location"	April 17, 2012	0.172
Doherty and Tutera disagree over where to hold the wedding. With Iswarienko's help, Doherty agrees to baby-sit her manager's son to determine if she is ready to have children.
3	"Shannen's Ready, Is Kurt?"	April 29, 2012	N/A
Doherty and Tutera agree on a venue for the wedding. While searching for a wedding dress, Doherty decides to wear three dresses over the course of the ceremony.
4	"When It Comes to Kurt's Career, He's Single"	April 29, 2012	N/A
Iswarienko accepts two jobs overseas, and leaves without consulting Doherty. She wonders if the wedding will still take place, since he never informs her about his career choices.
5	"A Wedding in Prague-ress"	May 6, 2012	N/A
Tutera attempts to further arrange the wedding, but Doherty refuses to proceed without Iswarienko's presence and input.
6	"Dress Mess"	May 6, 2012	N/A
After returning from a trip to Prague to discuss her future with Iswarienko, Doherty searches for vendors for the wedding. When her wedding dresses are delivered, she is disappointed and angry that they do not meet her expectations.
7	"The Wedding Gift"	May 13, 2012	N/A
Iswarienko attempts to find the perfect wedding present for Doherty, as final preparations are made for the wedding.
8	"The Wedding"	May 13, 2012	N/A
Doherty and Iswarienko are married after exchanging handwritten vows.

== Broadcast history and release ==
A preview was released before the show's debut, and Doherty promoted it through a Television Critics Association panel presentation at Pasadena, California. Shannen Says received additional publicity when Tori Spelling jokingly offered to plan Doherty's wedding during a 2011 interview with Entertainment Tonight Canada: "I'll do the wedding, I could probably comment on the wedding she'd want 20 years ago, but that wouldn't make any sense."

Shannen Says premiered on April 10, 2012, in the United States on WE TV at 10:00 pm Eastern Standard Time (EST). The original release date was scheduled for January 2012, and later April 3, 2012. The second episode aired the following Tuesday; after a 12-day gap, two episodes were aired every Sunday night in the same time slot until the end of the season. The show was broadcast internationally on WE TV Asia. AMC and Sundance Channel Global also acquired rights for Shannen Says, along with The Slap, Hell on Wheels, and Breaking Bad, in October 2011.

The series was commercially unsuccessful, but it was "marginally more popular" among women between the ages of 25 and 54. Doherty described Shannen Says as a one-off creation and denied interest in a second season. She rejected a suggestion for a second-season storyline about a pregnancy and child. Shannen Says ended on May 12, 2012. It was released on the iTunes Store on April 10, 2012, as Shannen Says, Season 1. All the episodes have been made available on Amazon Video since 2012, although it has not been released on Blu-ray or DVD. A writer from The Futon Critic reported that the series was canceled after being "on hiatus for longer than 12 months – without any news about its future."

== Critical reception ==
Shannen Says received mixed reviews from critics. A Life & Style contributor praised the show as "very entertaining". In HitFix, Geoff Berkshire wrote that it "looks great and moves swiftly from one drama to the next", and believed the episodes would satisfy fans of reality television. On the other hand, Kevin McDonough, writing for SouthCoastToday.com, criticized Shannen Says for attempting to "compensate for the lack of drama in Doherty's life with the manic production of a reality TV-sized wedding". As part of an article for The Washington Post, Emily Yahr, Caitlin Moore and Emily Chow cited Shannen Says, along with Hey Paula and Kirstie Alley's Big Life, as unsuccessful examples of the "autobiographical" reality show.

Critics had mixed reactions to Doherty. A reviewer for HuffPost said she was an ideal fit for reality television, describing her as "every bit the bad girl fans have been loving to hate to love for the past twenty-odd years". Geoff Berkshire found Doherty to be "equal doses crazy and amusing", but thought her attitude, like requesting wedding guests to wear black or be kicked out, could alienate some viewers. In MTV News, Maisy Fernandez said her personality resulted in a better reality show than Jennie Garth: A Little Bit Country, which starred her former Beverly Hills, 90210 co-star Jennie Garth. Criticizing Doherty's choice of television network, Fernandez believed it was unlikely a casual viewer would find the series while channel surfing. McDonough questioned if audiences would be disappointed that Doherty acts as a "reformed monster who just wants to have a normal life".
