= Beverly Hills, 90210 season 4 =

Beverly Hills, 90210
- Season 4
- DVD cover
- Starring: Jason Priestley Shannen Doherty Jennie Garth Ian Ziering Gabrielle Carteris Luke Perry Brian Austin Green Tori Spelling Carol Potter James Eckhouse
- No. of episodes: 32

Release
- Original network: Fox
- Original release: September 8, 1993 – May 25, 1994

Season chronology
- ← Previous; Season 3 Next → Season 5

The fourth season of Beverly Hills, 90210, an American teen drama television series aired from September 8, 1993 on Fox and concluded on May 25, 1994 after 32 episodes. The season aired Wednesday nights at 8/9c in the United States averaging 21.1 million viewers a week and was released on DVD in 2008.

This is the final season for Shannen Doherty, who would return as Brenda in the 2008 revival series 90210, and the first season for Mark Damon Espinoza (Jesse) and Kathleen Robertson (Clare).

== Overview ==
This season finds the Walsh Twins and friends have finished high school, and begin their freshmen year at California University, but quickly learn that college life comes with their own set of challenges.

== Cast ==
=== Starring ===
- Jason Priestley as Brandon Walsh
- Shannen Doherty as Brenda Walsh
- Jennie Garth as Kelly Taylor
- Ian Ziering as Steve Sanders
- Gabrielle Carteris as Andrea Zuckerman-Vasquez
- Luke Perry as Dylan McKay
- Brian Austin Green as David Silver
- Tori Spelling as Donna Martin
- Carol Potter as Cindy Walsh
- James Eckhouse as Jim Walsh

=== Recurring ===
- Joe E. Tata as Nat Bussichio
- Ann Gillespie as Jackie Taylor
- David Gail as Stuart Carson
- Paul Johansson as John Sears
- Dina Meyer as Lucinda Nicholson
- Mark Damon Espinoza as Jesse Vasquez
- Christine Elise as Emily Valentine
- Kerrie Keane as Suzanne Steele
- Kathleen Robertson as Clare Arnold
- Mark Kiely as Gil Meyers
- Katherine Cannon as Felice Martin
- Michael Durrell as John Martin
- Jennifer Grant as Celeste Lundy
- Ryan Brown as Morton Muntz
- Noley Thornton as Erica McKay
- Nicholas Pryor as Milton Arnold
- Tracy Middendorf as Laura Kingman

== Episodes ==
No. overall	No. in season	Title	Directed by	Written by	Original release date	Prod. code	U.S. viewers (millions)
81	1	"So Long, Farewell, Auf Wiedersehen, Goodbye"	Bill D'Elia	Charles Rosin	September 8, 1993	2193079	18.1
After the summer break, everyone prepares for university life. After working all summer at the Beverly Hills Beach Club, Brenda leaves Los Angeles to go to college in Minnesota and finds that her old friends now see her differently. Meanwhile, David and Donna seek out some affordable housing on the beach. As college approaches, Steve finally got off the wait list and accepted into C.U. and Brandon finishes his last day on the job of the Peach Pit. Steve and Brandon rent a beach front house in Malibu for the final two weeks of the summer, and they get a surprise visit from Steve's former girlfriend Jill Fleming, which makes Celeste jealous. Kelly returns from a two-month trip to Europe, without Dylan, who has been rejected from Berkeley. Also, Andrea frets with Gil Meyers over her deciding to stay in California to go to college.
82	2	"The Girl from New York City"	Jeffrey Melman	Steve Wasserman & Jessica Klein	September 15, 1993	2193080	15.1
Donna is afraid to tell her mother about David living with her and Kelly at their new beach front house. Kelly tells Donna about her troubles with Dylan during their stay in France. Dylan returns from Europe to reconcile with Kelly who admits she was faithful to him. Meanwhile, Steve and Brandon's competition for Jill's affection reaches a new level as Brandon learns some long kept secret about her. In Minnesota, Brenda becomes miserable with college life as well as deals with her brash roommate Darla Hanson.
83	3	"The Little Fish"	Gilbert M. Shilton	Larry Mollin	September 22, 1993	2193081	15.5
Brenda's return to Beverly Hills both startles her parents and upsets Brandon's plans for her bedroom. Brenda and Dylan spend a relaxing day together far away from the pressure of school and Kelly. Meanwhile, the rest of the gang begin Orientation at California University. Steve decides to rush a fraternity, Andrea meets her cute resident adviser Dan Ruben, Dylan chooses to forgo college, David and Donna try to audition for the DJ's on the California University's radio show, and Brandon becomes involved with college politics when he meets the student editor Josh Richland.
84	4	"Greek to Me"	Bethany Rooney	Chip Johannessen	September 29, 1993	2193082	13.9
It's Rush Week at California University and the group decides whether or not to pledge a Greek house. Andrea is dismayed when a leading Alpha Omega sister recruits her but advises her not to make it apparent she's Jewish, and Steve badgers Brandon to pledge Kappa Epsilon Gamma fraternity, otherwise known as KEG House. Brandon also gets involved with the school's progressive party, becoming the Freshman Representative to the Student Senate. Meanwhile, Kelly runs into John Sears, a past love whom she'd rather forget. KEG president Charlie Dixon, played by Patrick Fabian in the previous episode, is now portrayed by Sean O'Bryan.
85	5	"Radio Daze"	Richard Lang	Richard Gollance	October 6, 1993	2193083	14.4
To kick off the start of classes, the university throws a pool party for the incoming freshman. The whole gang attends and has a blast, but Steve's incessant flirting infuriates Celeste. Brenda gets a job in her father's office, Andrea and Dan plan a date, and Dylan clashes with John Sears over Kelly.
86	6	"Strangers in the Night"	James Eckhouse	Jennifer Flackett	October 13, 1993	2193084	16.4
David's late night radio show leads him to start taking caffeine pills, and the mess he makes around the apartment upsets Kelly and Donna. Brenda goes on a blind date with Stuart Carson, the son of one of her father's clients and it turns out to be an unexpected success. Meanwhile, Kelly cools her relationship with Dylan, and Andrea's relationship with Dan takes a surprising turn.
87	7	"Moving Targets"	Paul Schneider	Larry Mollin	October 20, 1993	2193085	13.9
After his brush with violent crime, Dylan becomes obsessed with self defense. He purchases an illegal gun and makes several trips to the shooting range. Meanwhile, Brenda and Stuart introduce their parents to each other over lunch in Bel-Air. Brandon is recruited by his sociology professor, Corey Randall, to tutor the university's basketball star, D'Shawn Hardell. Andrea and Dan mull over going public with their relationship.
88	8	"Twenty Years Ago Today"	James Whitmore Jr.	Steve Wasserman & Jessica Klein	October 27, 1993	2193086	15.0
The Walshes are celebrating their 20th anniversary, and before the evening is over one Walsh twin's life will change forever. Stuart has a surprising suggestion for Brenda, and Brandon startles a gun-wielding Dylan. Meanwhile, Andrea meets handsome young bartender Jesse Vasquez at the anniversary party. Brandon falls for an anthropologist grad student named Lucinda Nicholson whom he meets at a local gym. David's father, Mel, asks David to look after baby Erin while he takes off somewhere which angers Jackie when she finds out. Mark Damon Espinoza first appears as Jesse Vasquez, he would later be made a series regular.
89	9	"Otherwise Engaged"	Daniel Attias	Jennifer Flackett	November 3, 1993	2193087	16.3
Brenda is furious when she finds a prenuptial agreement in Stuart's briefcase, but she grows even angrier when she discovers a plot by her own parents to break up her engagement to Stuart. Brandon continues seeing Lucinda and is shocked to discover that she's married... to Professor Randall. Steve goes on a double date with one of his frat brothers... but the date doesn't include Celeste. Meanwhile, Jackie sues Mel for full custody of Erin which causes tension in the beach apartment between David and Kelly.
90	10	"And Did It... My Way"	Jason Priestley	Richard Gollance	November 10, 1993	2193088	17.0
Brenda and Stuart tire of listening to their parents squabble over wedding preparations so they head to Las Vegas for an old-fashioned elopement. In a show of supposed solidarity their friends follow, but they may have more up their sleeve than a celebratory bottle of champagne. Steve's jilted date, Laura, won't stop calling him. Meanwhile, Professor Randall invites Brandon to dinner, hosted by his wife... Lucinda Nicholson who continues to flirt with Brandon every chance she gets.
91	11	"Take Back the Night"	James Whitmore Jr.	Chip Johannessen	November 17, 1993	2193089	17.8
The campus is caught up in a "Take Back the Night" movement, and Steve finds himself fingered as a rapist by the jealous Laura. Steve must find a way to prove his innocence to those he loves, as the campus takes sides. Meanwhile, D'Shawn attempts to blackmail Brandon to take his mid-term paper when he thinks that Lucinda and Brandon are involved. John Sears shows his true colors to Kelly who finally rejects him.
92	12	"Radar Love"	Paul Schneider	Steve Wasserman & Jessica Klein	November 24, 1993	2193090	15.3
Brandon's road trip to find himself leads him to former love Emily Valentine, whose twisted obsession once tore their love apart. A now emotionally healthy Emily is thrilled to see him and the two spend a romantic week in San Francisco. Back in Beverly Hills, Andrea is also falling hard for Jesse, behind her boyfriend Dan's back. Meanwhile, Dylan spends Thanksgiving with the Walshes, sending ex-girlfriend Kelly into a fit of jealousy over Brenda's presence. Steve stops John Sears from trying to seduce an underage teen girl during a KEG party which makes Sears vow to get back at Steve for his interference. The KEG president is now named Mike Ryan and portrayed by Brandon Douglas.
93	13	"Emily"	Richard Lang	Steve Wasserman & Jessica Klein	December 1, 1993	2193091	15.5
In San Francisco, Brandon learns that Emily has been accepted to the prestigious Cousteau Institute in France, but does not want to attend because she and Brandon are in love. Brandon observes her passion for marine biology and encourages her to pursue her dream. Back in Beverly Hills, it's Hell Week for the Greek geeks of C.U and that means Steve, Donna, and Kelly are in for a series of humiliating experiences. But some take the fun too far and before the week is over, someone may end up in jail. Meanwhile, Brenda balks when she is asked to appear nude in an experimental campus play.
94	14	"Windstruck"	Gilbert M. Shilton	Larry Mollin & Richard Gollance	December 15, 1993	2193092	14.7
David and Donna head to Chinatown for their anniversary and Donna finally decides to sleep with David. But a visit from her parents cancels all plans. Meanwhile, the vindictive Professor Randall decides to press charges against Steve for stealing his autographed baseball. Brandon returns from his San Francisco trip and blackmails Randall to drop the breaking-and-entering charges against Steve by threatening to reveal that Randall has, for many years now, been giving athletes unearned grades so they'll maintain their eligibility. Elsewhere, Dan is bitter about Andrea's relationship with Jesse which results in their breakup and Dan requesting that he be reassigned to a different RA position.
95	15	"Somewhere in the World it's Christmas"	Bradley M. Gross	Charles Rosin	December 22, 1993	2193093	14.8
The winter holidays have arrived but no one's plans are going according to plan. As Dylan prepares to go to Baja for Christmas, a mysterious woman, named Suzanne, and her 11-year-old daughter, named Erica turn up on his doorstep, claiming to have a connection to the McKay lineage. Meanwhile, the Walsh family plans a Hawaiian holiday, but end up stranded in the airborne plane. Steve dresses up as Santa for disadvantaged children. Frustrated that Donna won't give up her virginity, David starts to act coldly towards her during a Christmas party at Mel's house. Also, Jesse takes Andrea to a midnight mass.
96	16	"Crunch Time"	Les Landau	Larry Mollin & Richard Gollance	January 5, 1994	2193094	16.6
After a hazing prank gone wrong, the KEG house hopes to avoid charges by unfairly distancing itself from Steve. When Steve learns from Brandon that he was set up to be caught during the baseball prank, he must prove that John Sears was behind that to his "brothers" or face expulsion from the fraternity. Fortunately, Sears is stupid enough to admit his wrongdoing to a well-respected frat leader, who then leads the frat to exonerate Steve and get rid of Sears instead. Meanwhile, Dylan offends Suzanne when he decides to do a background check on her. David starts abusing drugs (crystal methamphetamine) to keep up with his busy schedule, while Donna wonders what's wrong with his sudden change in behavior. Also, Brandon tries to get D'Shawn to take his mid-term finals, then an accident during a game sidelines D'Shawn, forcing him to study to pass his mid-term.
97	17	"Thicker Than Water"	Michael Lange	Lana Freistat Melman	January 12, 1994	2193095	18.9
David's addiction to stimulants spirals out of control and the result could cost him Erin's life. Meanwhile, the gang takes a ski trip where Donna meets a cute ski bum named Chad, but her attraction to him is complicated by her still strong feelings for David. Andrea gets a life-altering shock when she learns that she is pregnant. With Suzanne out of town, Dylan spends the day with Erica teaching her how to surf, which takes a turn when Erica gets her first menstrual period, forcing him to turn to Cindy for assistance. Dylan also learns that Suzanne has been keeping secrets from him when Jim makes a background check of Suzanne on Dylan's behalf with her social security number and uncovers a hidden bank account containing $20,000 after Suzanne has previously told Dylan that she is broke. When Dylan confronts Suzanne with the lie, she tells him that the money was only recently deposited into her account from a property insurance settlement after her home was destroyed by floods. Dylan believes Suzanne and agrees to trust her from now on, but Jim continues to remain suspicious about Suzanne and her intentions for Dylan.
98	18	"Heartbreaker"	Paul Schneider	Chip Johannessen	January 26, 1994	2193096	17.3
Brandon is chosen as the freshman representative of an elite national task force, which will help to make decisions in Washington regarding America's college campuses. Andrea grapples with her pregnancy and her decision to tell Jesse. Meanwhile, Nat suffers a heart attack and the future of The Peach Pit is in jeopardy. David seeks treatment for his drug use while trying to find a substitute for his radio shift and finds Steve, who does a bad job. Dylan gets Suzanne a job at the Peach Pit as a waitress and then tries to help out when Nat's cousin, Joey, wants to sell the Peach Pit due to Nat's failing health. Also, Cindy becomes involved in university life when she takes a part-time job at CU as a courtship instructor.
99	19	"The Labors of Love"	Jefferson Kibbee	Christine Pettit & Rosanne Welch	February 2, 1994	2193097	16.5
With Nat still in the hospital waiting heart surgery, Brandon temporally takes over running the Peach Pit, while Dylan rescues the place after he buys out Joey's share, making Dylan the co-owner. Meanwhile, David's drug problem returns, resulting in Kelly and Donna moving out. Howard the radio station DJ fires David after seeing him completely out of control in abusing drugs. Jesse disagrees with Andrea about her decision to get an abortion. Also, Brandon learns of Lucinda's divorce from Professor Randall and wants in on a relationship with her.
100	20	"Scared Very Straight"	Chip Chalmers	Gary Rosen	February 9, 1994	2193098	18.3
Andrea and Jesse's impromptu engagement leads to tension in the Zuckerman household, which upsets the pregnant freshman. How can she marry without the support of her parents and her grandmother? Donna tries to make up with David, whose increased drug use turns her away. David also steals $150 from Mel to buy more amphetamines for himself. Later, when David's drug dealer is arrested, he finds himself holding a huge stash of narcotics and calls Dylan for help; Dylan correctly guesses that the arrested dealer is going to lead the cops to David and forces a reluctant David to flush all of the drugs down the toilet, saving David's butt because the cops don't have anything to arrest him for when they burst into the apartment. A tearful David talks to Dylan, Kelly and Donna and says he knows he needs help and is going to get some. A dangerous affair begins between Brandon and Lucinda, while her true colors are shown when she begins teaching an anthropology class of human sexuality and preaches the need for multiple partners for she sees sex as her own personal weapon. Also, Brenda gets a surprise visit from a long-absent Stuart on Valentine's Day. Bess Meisler takes over the role of Rose Zuckerman.
101	21	"Addicted to Love"	Les Landau	Larry Mollin & Richard Gollance	February 16, 1994	2193099	17.3
Brandon uses Kelly as his date at a university social event to shield his affair with Lucinda from Josh Richland, the snooping student reporter from the Condor who is determined to dig up any dirt on Brandon. Meanwhile, Brenda and Stuart travel to Palm Springs where they find big complications from a small mistake Brenda makes which leaves them stranded in the desert, where Brenda finally breaks off their engagement for good. David rents a piano as a new hobby while Kelly moves back in with him and Donna. Also, Andrea lets Steve use her dorm room which he rents it out to Muntz and his other frat brothers.
102	22	"Change Partners"	Bethany Rooney	Chip Johannessen	February 23, 1994	2193100	15.3
Brenda and Donna adopt a stray dog, Rocky, who they fear has been mistreated. When Brenda learns he is a survivor of medical testing, she gets involved with a group of campus animal rights extremists. Meanwhile, Brandon and Kelly's fake relationship takes a very real turn during a Task Force retreat, which upsets and confuses Kelly, who apparently still harbors feelings for Dylan. Also, Brandon meets the chancellor's wild-child daughter, Clare Arnold, who makes no secret of her attraction to him. Also, Lucinda temporally loses interest in Brandon when she flirts with Dylan to ask him to finance her documentary film. Elsewhere, Andrea refuses to let Steve use her dorm room anymore after finding out that Steve sublets it to his KEG brothers. Kathleen Robertson first appears as Clare Arnold, she would later be made a series regular.
103	23	"A Pig Is a Boy Is a Dog"	Daniel Attias	Larry Mollin & Richard Gollance	March 2, 1994	2193101	20.1
Brenda and Donna attend an animal rights rally and are crestfallen when the university refuses to suspend animal testing. After the dog Rocky dies of cancer, Brenda becomes involved with a small group of radicals. She serves as lookout when the group breaks into the university research building and tries in vain to save Andrea's lab (which does not harm animals in its testing). Brenda is arrested. Meanwhile, Kelly and Brandon are furious when Dylan refuses to fund Lucinda's documentary film. Dylan finally tells Kelly that Lucinda attempted to seduce him in order to get money to fund her documentary. Kelly also confesses her kiss with Brandon. The jealous Dylan arrives at the Walsh house to fight Brandon, but the tension is defused when he accidentally punches Steve. When Brandon confronts Lucinda that she tried to seduce Dylan just to get money grant for her film, she shows no remorse over it and finally tells Brandon that she does not believe in monogamy. On top of that, Lucinda also claims to have had many sexual partners before Brandon, and even during her marriage with Professor Randall. Brandon does not take the news well and quietly breaks up with Lucinda.
104	24	"Cuffs and Links"	Gilbert M. Shilton	Steve Wasserman & Jessica Klein	March 16, 1994	2193102	18.4
Brenda calls Dylan from jail for bail help and to fruitlessly try to keep her parents from knowing she got arrested. Brenda's friends avoid her or upbraid her out of fear of being accessories after the fact and Kelly acts angry because she is tired of Dylan coming to Brenda's rescue. Brenda faces felony charges but finds out one of the radicals was an undercover Federal agent, who offers her a deal where she'll provide information and have all charges dropped against her. The group is left silent when Brenda tells them that she's sorry her actions hurt them but their actions hurt her as well, and a remorseful Kelly apologizes for shunning Brenda, admitting she still feels Dylan sees Brenda as his soulmate. Andrea gives Donna a healthy puppy (whom they name Rocky II) to take her mind off Rocky's death. Meanwhile, Steve and his overbearing father, Rush, a former actor-turned-lawyer, take on a baseball star and his father in a father/son golf tournament. Steve catches his father cheating and forces him to complete the game honestly. Also, Lucinda finally receives a grant for her movie and leaves the university. Josh threatens to publish the story of Brandon's affair with Lucinda, but after Brandon stands up to him, Josh impresses him by not running the story and hints he'd like Brandon as an ally for a political future on campus. This is the first appearance of Jed Allan as Rush Sanders, Steve's father.
105	25	"The Time Has Come Today"	Jason Priestley	Story by : Charles Rosin & Mick Gallinson; Teleplay by : Charles Rosin	March 23, 1994	2193103	17.3
Brenda discovers a diary hidden in her window seat that apparently belonged to a previous resident. Brenda becomes engrossed in parallels between the girl's accounts of the political struggles of the late 1960s and her own recent problems, imagining her and her friends in those Vietnam/Woodstock days, and is eventually able to join everyone on a ski trip after earlier backing out of going with them (to Brandon's irritation). Gabrielle Carteris does not appear in this episode. Kristine Mejia later had a recurring role as Dana.
106	26	"Blind Spot"	Michael Lange	Ken Stringer	April 6, 1994	2193104	16.2
When Steve accidentally discovers that the KEG house president, Mike Ryan, is a closeted homosexual he doesn't handle it well, outing Mike for no good reason and coming to terms with his own homophobia in time to strongly (and successfully) defend Mike when the KEG brothers want to remove him as President. While working with Kelly to recruit guys for the "Men of CU" beefcake calendar, Donna goes on a spontaneous date with D'Shawn just to make David jealous when she finds him flirting with his blind savant piano teacher Holly. Jack Armstrong replaces Brandon Douglas in the role of Mike Ryan.
107	27	"Divas"	David Semel	Larry Mollin	April 20, 1994	2193105	13.8
Brenda is thrilled when an acclaimed director, named Roy Randolph, arrives at the university to direct the campus production of Cat on a Hot Tin Roof. But things go south when she finds herself competing against Kelly for the lead. Meanwhile, Clare Arnold arrives on campus and takes extreme measures in her pursuit of Brandon. Steve is reunited with Laura Kingman (the girl who tried to accuse him of date-rape), where he coaches her for the same lead role, while Kelly also wants in on the part. Also, Dylan tries to help a jealous Erica accept her mother's new chemist boyfriend, Kevin.
108	28	"Acting Out"	Jeff Melman	Chip Johannessen	April 27, 1994	2193106	17.5
Brenda feels betrayed by Kelly's decision to audition against her for the lead in the play and refuses to speak to her anymore. But Kelly isn't the only one competing against Brenda for the lead as Laura tries out for the role in a call-back audition, and Brenda eventually heads to Roy's condo to do an unofficial audition. Meanwhile, Clare tricks Brandon into taking her to her senior prom at her posh boarding school which leads to Brandon getting decked by an angry passerby at Clare's hotel post-prom party. Jesse's not around when Andrea has a medical emergency and she's forced to call on Donna (whom she'd earlier been dismissive of) for help to take her to the hospital. Elsewhere, Kevin continues to charm his way into Dylan and Suzanne's lives which makes Kelly feel left out as she begins to distrust both Kevin and Suzanne once again.
109	29	"Truth and Consequences"	James Eckhouse	Richard Gollance	May 4, 1994	2193107	16.2
After Brenda finally wins the lead role in the play, the furious and mentally unbalanced Laura attempts to sabotage her by claiming that Brenda had sex with Roy Randolph to earn the lead, something that Kelly, Brandon and especially Steve wrongly finds believable. After Laura nearly uses her understudy status to have Brenda fired, Steve is shocked to realize that Laura is crazy and dangerous, and after Roy kicks her off the play Laura nearly kills herself before Brenda prevents that tragedy. Steve asks if Brenda will forgive him, but she dodges the question and heads off to shed tears over everything that happened. Meanwhile, Kevin impresses Dylan and Erica when they visit his lab where he tells Dylan about his clean-up plans for Santa Monica Bay which are underfunded. Dylan asks Kevin if he could act as his beneficiary to open up his own chemical clean-up company, while Kevin also announces his engagement to Suzanne. Kelly continues to resent Suzanne and Kevin's presence which widens the rift between her and Dylan after she tells him that something is not right about Kevin and Suzanne after catching them in a series of insignificant lies. Dylan refuses to listen to Kelly. Jesse suggests more bed-rest for Andrea who continues to feel unwell over her pregnancy. Elsewhere, Brandon speaks with Clare's father over her wild behavior while she's making future plans to travel with him.
110	30	"Vital Signs"	Daniel Attias	Larry Mollin	May 11, 1994	2193108	17.1
Dylan and Kelly finally break up due to the tension between them as well as Dylan spending more time with Erica, Suzanne and Kevin. Kelly openly tells Dylan that she doesn't trust Suzanne and Kevin over their continuing presence. One morning, Erica tells Dylan that she overheard her mother and boyfriend talking about moving to South America, but Kevin and Suzanne (for some suspicious reason) easily convince Dylan that Erica misheard what they were talking about and that they want to relocate Kevin's new chemical company in Arizona in the southwest. Dylan considers investing in Kevin's to finance his new business, as does Jim who agrees to be a silent partner. Meanwhile, Brenda finds old feelings for Dylan returning to her when he gives her an opening-night gift medal before the play, one that Steve attends when some prodding from Brandon leads him to get over his bad feelings towards Brenda and she in turn does forgive him. Elsewhere, David sees danger of his drug use returning in working with a new rock band for the CU's Marti Gras. Andrea is hospitalized and has strange dreams fearing she may lose the baby. Also, Brandon tries to meet with an elusive Chancellor Arnold after he sees that his name is not on a list of task forces members to meet the president, thinking that his times with Clare may have cost him the trip to Washington. But, Brandon eventually learns that the Chancellor is looking forward to his attendance at the national task force and that he was never going to be removed from it, even with Clare's machinations.
111	31	"Mr. Walsh Goes to Washington"	Michael Lange	Steve Wasserman & Jessica Klein & Charles Rosin	May 25, 1994	2193109A	20.3
112	32	"Mr. Walsh Goes to Washington"	Michael Lange	Steve Wasserman & Jessica Klein & Charles Rosin	May 25, 1994	2193109B	20.3
Brandon travels to Washington, D.C. with the Task Force where two women, both Clare and Lucinda, grapple (literally!) for his attention. Meanwhile, Brenda is offered by Randolph the opportunity of a lifetime: the chance to spend the summer studying theater at the Royal Academy in London. At the CU Mardi Gras carnival, David seeks to meet and impresses pop star Kenneth "Babyface" Edmunds, and his recording manager Ariel (guest star Kari Wuhrer) with his keyboard music. Steve becomes upset when he runs into his former girlfriend Celeste at the carnival who's now with John Sears. Elsewhere, Kevin and Suzanne get married in a semi-formal ceremony where he persuades Dylan to cut out any outside investment in their business offer. Also, Andrea goes into labor and gives birth to a baby girl born prematurely by cesarean section. In the second part of the season finale, Kelly travels to Washington to meet Brandon and they spend a romantic day together to get away from both Clare and Lucinda still hounding him as well as the stress of the travel and they end up in bed. Before leaving for London, Brenda ends up spending her last night in California in Dylan's bed. Donna catches David in a compromising position with Ariel after catching them having sex in a limo. Donna breaks up with David and throws him out of the beachfront apartment. Steve continues to clash with Sears over Celeste's affections. Meanwhile, Andrea and Jesse experience the joys and fears of parenthood for their premature daughter. Jim becomes angry at Dylan for making such a rash decision to finance Kevin's chemical company all by himself which he fires Dylan as his financial holder. The next day, Dylan goes to a bank and gives Kevin full power-of-attorney control over his money. But it is revealed in a climatic twist to the viewers that both of Kelly's and Jim's original suspicions about Kevin and Suzanne were entirely correct; both Suzanne and Kevin really are career criminals and con artists who have been plotting this whole time to steal all of Dylan's inheritance money and flee to Brazil with it. Erica figures out what is going on and at LAX, she attempts to leave a note for Dylan to find, but the note gets lost when Erica drops it in the ladies' room. This is Shannen Doherty's final episode and features a special appearance by Babyface. Cliff Dorfman, who plays his second different character in the series, would later have a recurring role as Joe Patch.

== Home media ==
The DVD release of season four was released in Regions 1, 2 and 4. This season is currently available to stream via CBS Access, however, episodes 15 and 32 are missing due to copyright permissions.

The Fourth Season
Set details		Special features
32 episodes; 1444 minutes (Region 1); 1386 minutes (Region 2); 8-disc set; 1.33:1 aspect ratio; Languages: English (Dolby Digital 2.0 Surround); Subtitles: English, Dutch, Norwegian, Danish, Finnish, Swedish and French (Region 1)		"7 Minutes in Heaven"; "Everything You Need to Know About Beverly Hills, 90210 season 4"; "A Look Back with Charles Rosin"; "Beverly Hills Moms"; "90210 Genre Benders"; "The Loves of Season 4"
Release dates		"7 Minutes in Heaven"; "Everything You Need to Know About Beverly Hills, 90210 season 4"; "A Look Back with Charles Rosin"; "Beverly Hills Moms"; "90210 Genre Benders"; "The Loves of Season 4"
United States	United Kingdom	"7 Minutes in Heaven"; "Everything You Need to Know About Beverly Hills, 90210 season 4"; "A Look Back with Charles Rosin"; "Beverly Hills Moms"; "90210 Genre Benders"; "The Loves of Season 4"
April 29, 2008	September 1, 2008	"7 Minutes in Heaven"; "Everything You Need to Know About Beverly Hills, 90210 season 4"; "A Look Back with Charles Rosin"; "Beverly Hills Moms"; "90210 Genre Benders"; "The Loves of Season 4"
