= Growing the Big One =

2010 television film by Mark Griffiths

- DVD cover
- Written by: Anna Sandor; Diane Mettler
- Directed by: Mark Griffiths
- Starring: Shannen Doherty; Kavan Smith; Aaron Pearl
- Music by: James Hazell
- Countries of origin: United States; Canada
- Original language: English

Production
- Producers: Howard Meltzer (exec.); Jane Goldenring (exec.); Ted Bauman (exec.); Randolph Cheveldave
- Cinematography: Mahlon Todd Williams
- Editor: Roger Mattiussi
- Running time: 84 minutes
- Production company: GBO Films

Original release
- Network: Hallmark Channel
- Release: October 23, 2010

Growing the Big One is a 2010 Canadian-American television film directed by Mark Griffiths. It was developed as one of twenty-four programs scheduled for broadcast on the Hallmark Channel and Hallmark Movies & Mysteries during the 2010–11 television season. Anna Sandor and Diane Mettler wrote the film; Howard Meltzer, Jane Goldenring, and Ted Bauman served as executive producers. Shannen Doherty and Kavan Smith star as the lead characters. One commentator noted that the film marked a transition for Doherty away from her "bad girl" reputation.

The plot revolves around radio personality Emma Silver, played by Doherty, as she attempts to pay off her recently deceased grandfather's debts by entering a pumpkin growing contest. As the movie progresses, a romance develops between her and her new neighbor Seth Cullen, portrayed by Smith. She must choose if she wants to stay in her rural hometown or accept a promising job opportunity in New York City. Mettler's brother's experiences participating in pumpkin growing contests was the inspiration for the film's narrative. It was filmed and produced over the course of a few days in October 2009.

The film premiered on October 23, 2010, as the start of the Hallmark Channel's Countdown to Halloween programming block. It received a Nielsen rating of 2.6 million viewers, which made it the second highest performing television movie on all ad-supported cable television networks for the night. Critical response to Growing the Big One was largely positive; some critics praised the story and Doherty's performance, while others were more critical of the chemistry between the two lead actors. It was released on DVD three days following the film's premiere.

== Plot ==
Emma Silver is a radio personality who relocated from New York City to establish her career in Seattle. After hearing of her grandfather Walt's death, Emma returns to her childhood home in Valleyville, Washington. After meeting with the attorney Bobby Ellis, Emma discovers that she has inherited Walt's farm and pumpkin seeds. Bobby suggests that Walt wanted Emma to enter the local pumpkin growing contest to keep up a family tradition. In his last letter, Walt instructs his granddaughter to find someone to take care of the farm. Emma's new neighbor Seth Cullen contemplates asking Emma for Walt's seeds so that he can enter the contest and win its grand prize, which would allow him to open his own automobile repair shop. Emma and Seth first meet when he is repairing her front door and she mistakes him for a burglar. During Walt's funeral, Emma learns that Walt was in debt. Bobby tells her that the entire debt must be paid by the end of the year or the farm will be foreclosed. Mayor Kyle Finster informs Emma that he intends to develop the land following its foreclosure.

Emma is dismayed to learn that she has been replaced by a younger radio host and is reassigned to a gardening program she is tasked to video broadcast via webcams installed in Walt's farmhouse. Emma talks to Seth about his future business plans, and later learns that the grand prize for the pumpkin growing contest will be doubled if the entry weighs more than the world record. She decides to enter the contest. Her first broadcast is a disaster because of her lack of familiarity with the subject. A group of women from the town known as the "Pumpkin Widows" spend time with Emma and begin teaching her about growing pumpkins, and tell her of Walt's practice of singing "The Yankee Doodle Boy" to his seeds. They are called the Pumpkin Widows because their husbands focus all of their energy on growing pumpkins. A video of Emma and the women serenading the pumpkin seeds goes viral, leading Emma's new boss to coordinate a campaign for her program around the pumpkin growing contest.

Following the women's suggestion, Emma searches for and finds Walt's journal containing all of his pumpkin growing secrets. She discovers that Walt documented all of his strategies in code. After Seth helps to translate a portion of the journal, he tries to partner with her, but she refuses believing she must grow the pumpkins by herself. Emma is unable to spread manure as she falls down while attempting to use the tiller. During a poker game Seth wins a bet which forces Emma to collaborate with him for the contest. While they work together, Seth participates in Emma's radio program. Bobby informs Seth about her reasons for joining the contest.

The pair's pumpkins growth is slow, and Seth and Emma often clash during their collaboration. They grow closer while watching old films together and discussing their pasts. Seth talks about his degree in engineering from Stanford University and his decision to move out of the city in favor of the country, and Emma reveals her childhood dream of hosting her own talk show. When they are interviewed by Emma as part of her show, the Pumpkin Widows share stories of their husbands' obsessions with growing pumpkins. Emma and Seth sneak onto the mayor's farm to find out his pumpkin growing secrets. Emma asks Seth on a date while they appear at a promotional photo shoot in Seattle. Their date is interrupted by Emma accepting an offer from a television executive to be an anchor on a New York City morning news program. The pair's pumpkin starts growing larger; Emma finds the real pumpkin growing journal and learns that the other book was actually Walt's poems to his wife. Emma and Seth win the contest, and beat the record. Rejecting the New York job offer, Emma starts her own talk show in Valleyville along with Seth. Emma pays off Walt's debt with the prize money, and Seth opens his own car repair shop. The film ends with the couple becoming engaged.

== Cast ==
- Shannen Doherty as Emma Silver
- Kavan Smith as Seth Cullen
- Aaron Pearl as Bobby Ellis
- April Telek as Marie Burns
- Stephanie Belding as Betty Winslow
- Keith MacKechnie as Russell Winslow
- Ralph Alderman as Hank Moffat
- Alf Humphreys as Sheriff Quinn
- Dolores Drake as Carol Moffat
- Eric Keenleyside as Mayor Kyle Finster
- Sarah-Jane Redmond as Kate Rinaldi-Rogers
- John Stewart as Jeff Burns
- Garry Chalk as Edward Miles
- John Kramer as Pumpkin King
- John Hainsworth as Father Nick
- Krista Mitchell as Savannah Grace
- Scott Patey as Technician
- Mark Brandon as Marcus Masters
- Madison Desjarlais as Kim

== Production ==
=== Development ===
The 84-minute television film was written by Anna Sandor and Diane Mettler and directed by Mark Griffiths. Howard Meltzer, Jane Goldenring, and Ted Bauman served as the film's executive producers; Randolph Cheveldave was its producer. Production was handled by GBO Films. The film's music was edited by James Hazell, and Mahlon Todd Williams was its cinematographer.

Growing the Big One was promoted as part of Hallmark's collection of original, holiday movies. It was one of twenty-four films scheduled for broadcast on the Hallmark Channel and its affiliate digital cable and satellite television channel Hallmark Movies & Mysteries for the 2010–11 television season. While discussing the reasons behind the scheduling decisions, Barbara Fisher, the senior vice president of Hallmark Channel's programming, said: "Original movies will continue to be the centerpiece of our prime time schedule as we broaden our entire programming mix and as we transition our daytime to home and lifestyle-oriented programming."

=== Filming and post-production ===
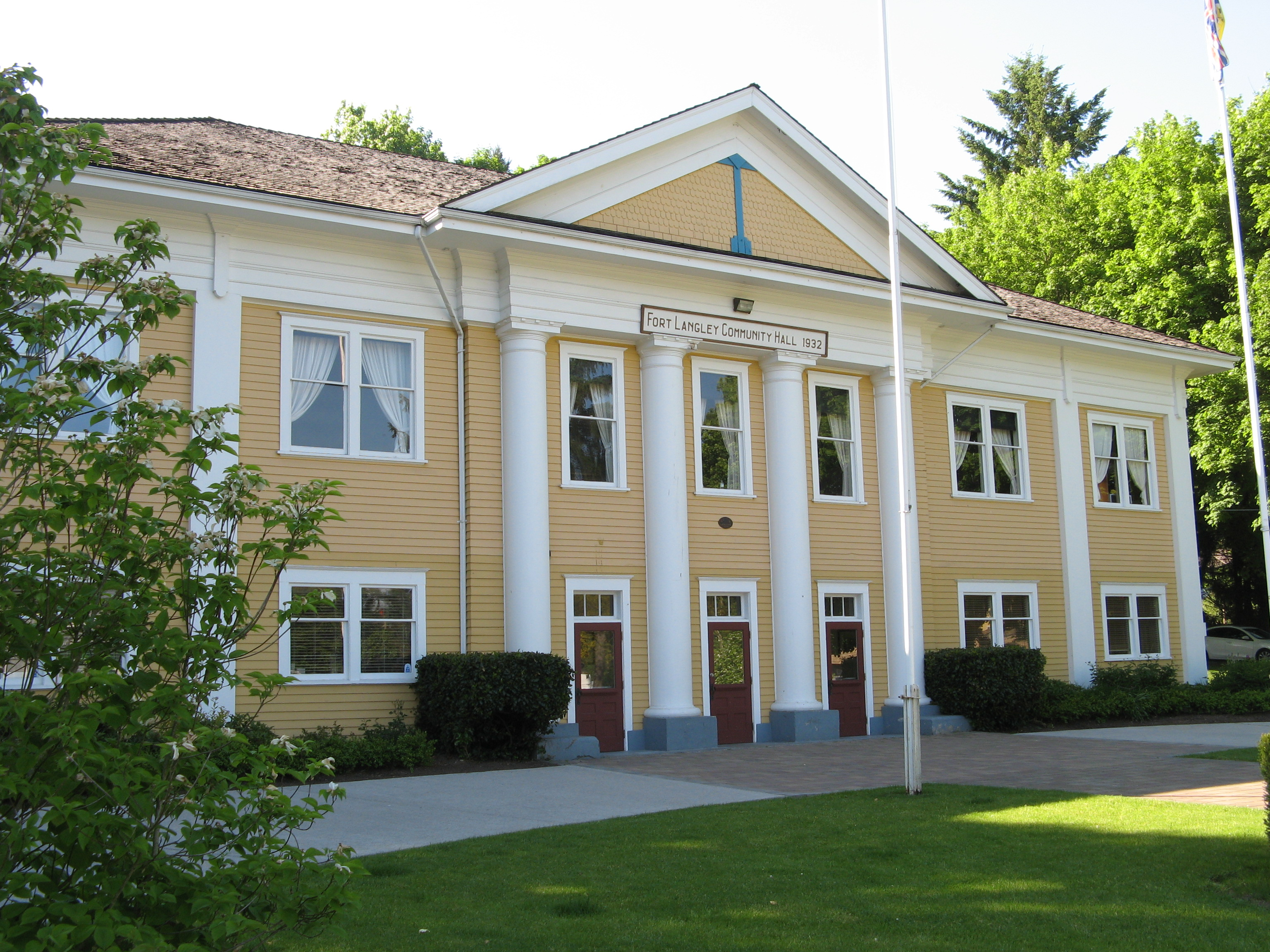
Filming took place partially in the Canadian village of Fort Langley, British Columbia.

On October 14, 2009, the Hallmark Channel issued a press release announcing that Doherty was cast as the star for the television film; Kavan Smith was confirmed as her co-star on March 23, 2010. Filming took place in Vancouver, British Columbia with production beginning in October 2009. Several scenes were shot in Fort Langley, British Columbia. Hazell said that the entire project was filmed on location since "[they] managed to find great locations to give [the] film its country feeling". The pumpkins were modelled after champion pumpkins from the United States and Canada.

Doherty completed filming her scenes shortly before her participation as a contestant on the tenth season of the reality competition show Dancing with the Stars. Nancy Mills of USA Today wrote that Doherty's performance in the project marked her transition away from her earlier "bad girl" image, stemming from her arrest for driving under the influence and vandalism and subsequent anger management counseling.

Doherty said that she decided to work on more family-friendly films for "[her] goddaughter and for [her] brother's seven kids", adding that: "[she] get[s] joy out of their watching something [her] brother approves of. They can all sit around and talk about it and call [her] afterward." She found the role and the film to be "lighter and fluffier" compared with her earlier work. The actress connected with Silver through their shared dedication to their careers and their decisions to re-prioritize their lives. When approaching her character, Doherty felt that Silver's story arc was about "honoring her grandfather and finding good friends, a sense of community and love"; she connected with this story line because of her close connections to her own family.

== Broadcast history and release ==
A sneak peek and a behind-the-scenes video were released before the film's debut. Growing the Big One was first broadcast on October 23, 2010, on the Hallmark Channel at 9 pm Eastern Standard Time in the United States. It served as the start of the network's "Countdown to Halloween" programming block. During the promotion of the television project, the network's executives said that it was "the first film to be harvested in the network's three-month countdown to the holidays".

It received a Nielsen rating of 2.6 million viewers, which made it the second highest performing television movie on all ad-supported cable television networks for the night. It was also the third highest rated movie for October 23, 2010, for women between the ages of 25 and 54, and helped make the Hallmark Channel the fourth highest rated cable network for that day. The movie was released for home viewing on DVD on October 26, 2010. It was released with the tagline, "Love Grows In Funny Places", and promoted as "family entertainment".

== Critical reception ==
Critical response was largely positive, with Angelique Flores of Home Media magazine calling it "wholesome, sweet and refreshing" and an appropriate alternative to the typical horror films shown during Halloween. Entertainment Weekly's Mandi Bierly praised the film's title, writing: "This is one title we'll enjoy adding to the 'city girl needs to move to the country to find a man' genre". Bierly compared the filming style and locations to those used in the American comedy-drama television series Gilmore Girls (2000–2007), and said that she was "obsessed" with the Hallmark television movie. Echoing Bierly's sentiment, Michelle of the online news magazine TV Equals described Growing the Big One as "my absolute favorite kind of television holiday movie". The Los Angeles Times' Ed Stockly included the film in his guide to Halloween on television. Jessica Leigh Mattern wrote that Growing the Big One would appeal to fans of the television series When Calls the Heart.

Laura Fries of Variety provided a more mixed review of Growing the Big One, calling it a "corny, or more adequately, 'seedy' original pic" reminiscent of the 1987 film Baby Boom. Fries praised Doherty's performance as "showing more warmth and charisma than seen in a good while" and the performances and relationships in the small-town community, but was critical of Smith's acting and the chemistry between the two lead actors.
