= Shannen Doherty =

American actress (1971–2024)

- Doherty in 2011
- Born: Shannen Maria Doherty; April 12, 1971; Memphis, Tennessee, U.S.
- Died: July 13, 2024 (aged 53); Malibu, California, U.S.
- Occupation: Actress
- Years active: 1981–2024
- Works: Filmography
- Spouses: Ashley Hamilton (m. 1993; div. 1994) Rick Salomon (m. 2002; ann. 2003) Kurt Iswarienko (m. 2011; div. 2024) (Note: Doherty filed for divorce in April 2023 but the divorce was finalized shortly before her death. A Los Angeles judge declared the couple officially divorced two days after she died.)

Signature
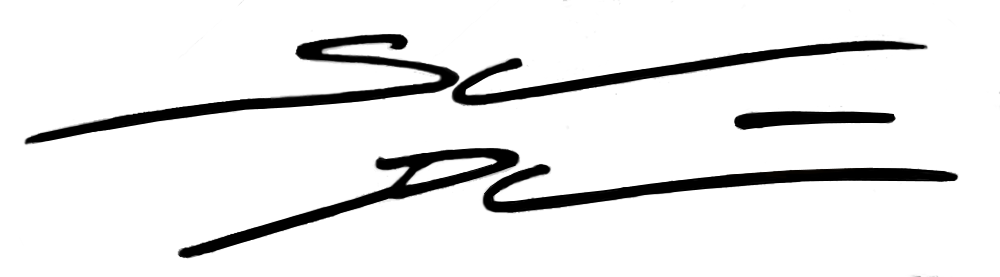

Shannen Maria Doherty (/ˈdoʊ.ərti/; April 12, 1971 – July 13, 2024) was an American actress. During her career in film and television, she played, among others, Jenny Wilder in Little House on the Prairie (1982–1983); Maggie Malene in Girls Just Want to Have Fun (1985); Kris Witherspoon in Our House (1986–1988); Heather Duke in Heathers (1989); Brenda Walsh in Beverly Hills, 90210 (1990–1994), 90210 (2008–2009), and BH90210 (2019); Rene Mosier in Mallrats (1995); and Prue Halliwell in Charmed (1998–2001).

== Early life and education ==
Shannen Maria Doherty was born on April 12, 1971, in Memphis, Tennessee, to Tom and Rosa Doherty. She was raised in her mother's Southern Baptist faith. She had a brother, Sean, and their family moved to Los Angeles, California when she was 6 years old. Doherty attended the Lycée Français de Los Angeles, a private French-language school, from which she graduated in 1988 with honors, although did not maintain French fluency after graduation.

== Career ==
=== Child acting: 1982–1988 ===
In 1982, Doherty had guest spots on TV series including Voyagers! and Father Murphy, which was created and produced by Michael Landon. The same year, 11-year-old Doherty won the recurring role of Jenny Wilder on Little House on the Prairie, in which Landon starred and produced. Doherty appeared in 18 episodes in the final season of the show, which was cancelled in 1983.

Doherty lent her voice to the animated film The Secret of NIMH in 1982. She appeared in an episode of Magnum, P.I. ("A Sense of Debt"), followed by an early episode of Airwolf ("Bite of the Jackal"), for which she was nominated as Best Young Actress: Guest in a Series at the 6th Youth in Film Awards in 1984.

In 1985, Doherty starred as Maggie Malene in the teen movie comedy Girls Just Want to Have Fun alongside actresses Helen Hunt and Sarah Jessica Parker. Doherty was cast as the oldest Witherspoon sibling, Kris, on the family drama Our House, which ran from 1986 to 1988, a role which garnered her a Young Artist Award nomination.

=== Fame: 1988–2001 ===
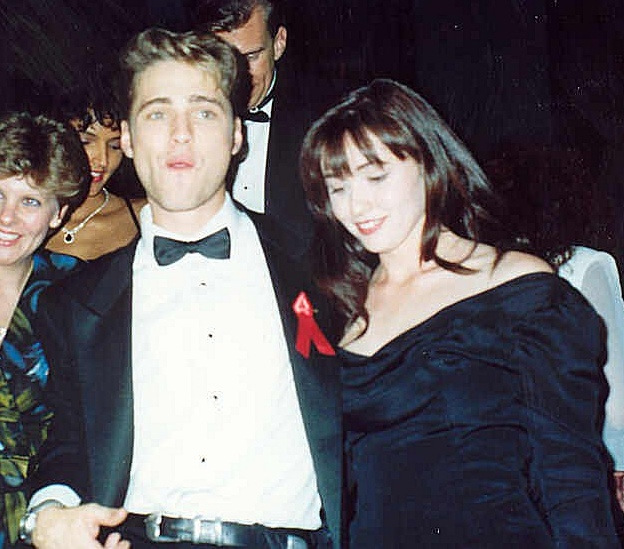
Doherty with Jason Priestley at the Governor's Ball following the 43rd Annual Emmy Awards, August 1991

Doherty's first major motion picture role was in the dark comedy Heathers, which premiered in 1988. She garnered worldwide attention and fame for her breakout role as Brenda Walsh in the Aaron Spelling–produced TV series Beverly Hills, 90210 in 1990. In 1991 and 1992, her portrayal of Brenda earned her a Young Artist Award nomination for Best Young Actress Starring in a Television Series. Doherty left the show after the fourth season in 1994.

She appeared nude in Playboy magazine, first in December 1993, followed by a spread in March 1994. She posed for the magazine again in December 2003 and was featured in a 10-page pictorial.

Doherty's career afterward primarily consisted of made-for-TV movies, although she also had a lead role in Kevin Smith's 1995 film Mallrats and later cameoed in Jay and Silent Bob Strike Back. In 1998, Spelling again cast her in another of his television series, Charmed, in which she played one of the lead characters, Prue Halliwell, the oldest of three sisters who are witches. Doherty also directed three episodes for the series during the second and third seasons, including the western special "The Good, the Bad and the Cursed". Doherty left the show in 2001 at the end of the third season, resulting in her character's death in the episode "All Hell Breaks Loose" which she directed. Reportedly, her departure was caused by on-set and off-set tensions between Doherty and co-star Alyssa Milano. In 2004, E! placed Doherty at number 10 on their list of the 50 Most Wicked Women of Prime Time. In 2007, AOL named Prue Halliwell the 9th greatest witch in television history.

=== Later work: 2002–2024 ===
In 2003, Doherty hosted the Sci-Fi Channel candid-camera show Scare Tactics during its initial season. From 2004 to 2005, in a return to her prime-time soap roots, Doherty starred as a regular on the short-lived TV series North Shore, as Alexandra Hudson. Later in 2005, she was in the pilot for a comedy, Love Inc.

In 2006, Doherty produced and starred in her own reality show, Breaking Up with Shannen Doherty, which premiered on the Oxygen channel. In the show, Doherty carried out the "dirty work" for members of the public, including dumping boyfriends or telling people what their friends really think about them. The show was canceled after one season due to poor ratings.

During 2007, Doherty appeared in two television projects. She first appeared in Kiss Me Deadly: A Jacob Keane Assignment for the Here TV network and followed up with a starring role in the holiday film Christmas Caper for ABC Family. That same year, Doherty also set up a production company called No Apologies, with which she planned to develop a TV drama for herself. Later in 2007, Doherty was ranked number 96 on Entertainment Weekly's list of the 100 Greatest Television Icons.

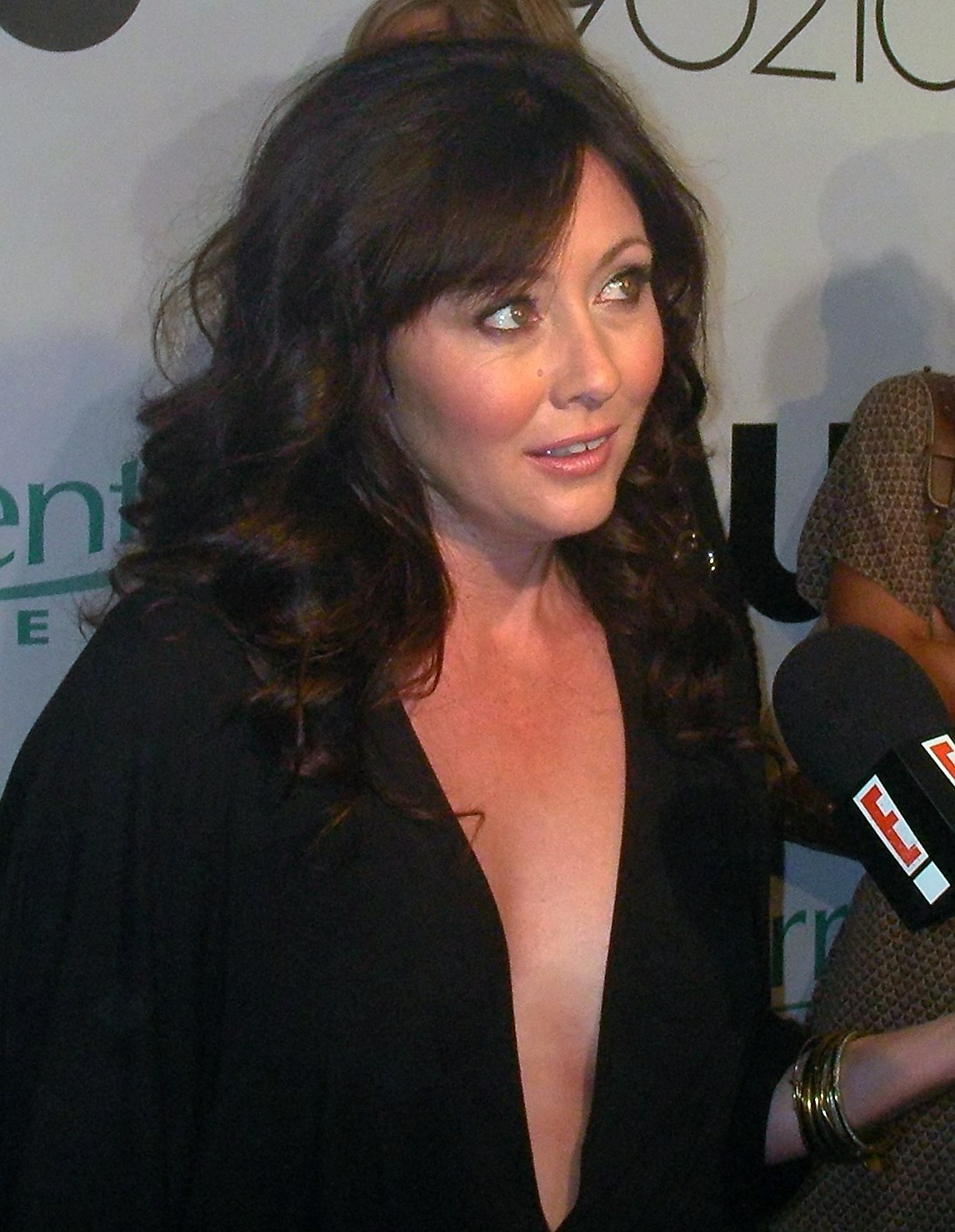
Doherty in 2008

Also in 2008, 14 years after her last previous television appearance as Brenda Walsh, Doherty joined the cast of the Beverly Hills, 90210 spin off for The CW Television Network for a reported $40,000–50,000 an episode. She returned as a guest star in the new series, reprising her old role of Brenda in four of the initial six episodes. Her character, now a successful theater actress and stage director, returned as the guest director of the high school musical. After her initial guest spot was completed, Doherty stated she was open to returning to the series later in the season and eventually agreed to appear in three additional episodes, including an airing in May 2009. The writers were eager to have her share scenes with Jennie Garth, who reprised her own 90210 role of Kelly Taylor. It was reported that Doherty and Garth's characters would both have a romantic interest in the character Ryan Matthews (Ryan Eggold) reminiscent of their old rivalry for former bad-boy character Dylan McKay (Luke Perry). Doherty and Garth later confirmed that the reports about the love triangle between their characters were false.

In late 2008, Doherty was announced to co-star alongside Dylan McDermott in the independent film Burning Palms, a satire based on Los Angeles stereotypes told through five intertwining storylines. The film's world premiere was at the Newport Beach Film Festival in April 2010.

On March 1, 2010, it was announced that Doherty would be a celebrity contestant on Dancing with the Stars for the tenth season. The season premiered on Monday, March 22, 2010. Doherty was paired with two-time champion Mark Ballas in his sixth season on the show, but the pair was the first couple eliminated in the second week on March 30. She wanted to do Dancing with the Stars to make her ailing father proud.

Doherty starred in Fearnet's animated web series Mari-Kari, which launched on June 3, 2010. Mari and Kari are identical twins, but Kari is already dead and is a ghost. Doherty voiced both Mari and Kari in the eight-episode show. She also starred in the Hallmark film Growing the Big One in 2010.

On July 21, 2011, WE tv announced that Doherty would star in a one-hour reality series that would follow her and her fiancé, Kurt Iswarienko, as they planned their wedding. The show, Shannen Says, premiered on April 10, 2012.

On July 24, 2014, it was announced that Doherty and her former Charmed co-star Holly Marie Combs would star in their own road-trip reality show called Off the Map with Shannen & Holly, which premiered on Great American Country on January 2, 2015. The six-episode series followed the pair traveling across southeastern United States, with stops in Kentucky, Tennessee, Mississippi, Alabama, Georgia, and Florida. Viewers were able to vote on activities in which Doherty and Combs engaged at each destination on Great American Country's official website.

Doherty in Suite 7 (2011)

In November 2016, Doherty joined the cast of a Heathers television series, originally set to air on Paramount Network in March 2018. She played the mother of one of the new generation of "Heathers", different from the character of Heather Duke that she originated in the 1989 film. However, the Parkland school shooting affected the show's premiere, which was delayed because of its dark tone and themes of high school violence. In June 2018, the network chose to pull the show altogether. Ultimately, the series aired over five nights in October 2018.

In 2019, Doherty reunited with her original Beverly Hills, 90210 castmates Jenny Garth, Jason Priestley, Ian Ziering, Gabrielle Carteris, Brian Austin Green, and Tori Spelling for BH90210, which was a six-episode series in which the cast played heightened, fictionalized versions of themselves. The series aired on FOX in August and September 2019 and was canceled after one season.

The same year, she was in the movie Undateable John, starring Daryl Hannah, Tom Arnold, and Margaret Cho.

In 2021, she was in the movie Fortress starring Jesse Metcalfe, Bruce Willis, Chad Michael Murray, and Kelly Greyson. The film was released in select theaters and on video on demand by Lionsgate Films in December 2021.

== Other ventures ==
In 1995, Doherty became the face of K-beauty cosmetics in South Korea, under a $250,000 contract, according to the Los Angeles Times.

In early 2009, she became an art director for Pasadena Magazine. In November 2009, Doherty was the guest of honor at Disneyland Paris to kick off the Christmas season.

In 2011, Doherty appeared in a couple of commercials for Education Connection, which posed itself at the time as an online college.

In December 2023, she launched her podcast Let's Be Clear with Shannen Doherty, produced by iHeartRadio.

== Personal life ==
In early 1993, Doherty was briefly engaged to Max Factor heir Dean Jay Factor, until he filed for a restraining order on May 25, 1993. He alleged physical violence and threats on the part of Doherty; Doherty's father claimed that the abuse came from Factor and not her.

On October 11, 1993, Doherty married Ashley Hamilton. They filed for divorce in April 1994.

In 2002, Doherty married Rick Salomon, and the marriage was annulled after nine months. On October 15, 2011, Doherty married photographer Kurt Iswarienko in Malibu, California.

In November 2018, Doherty lost her house to the Woolsey Fire.

In April 2023, Doherty announced that she had filed for divorce from Iswarienko. As of October 2023, the couple was almost finished with their divorce proceedings, though in June 2024, it was reported that Doherty had stated in legal filings that her husband was attempting to prolong the process in order to avoid spousal payments. In response to those reports, Doherty said in her Let's Be Clear podcast that divorcing under the public eye was "exhausting" and that she might or might not openly discuss her marriage after her divorce was final. The terms of her divorce agreement were finalized the day before her death, and a Los Angeles judge declared the couple officially divorced two days after she died.

Doherty was a registered Republican. In 2012, she said: "I realize that the majority of people in the entertainment business happen to be Democrats. I have no problem with that. And they should have no problem with the fact that I'm a Republican."

=== Public image ===
During the time she was working on Beverly Hills, 90210, Doherty gained a reputation in the media for bad behavior that dominated her public image for many years. People magazine called her the "iconic Hollywood 'bad girl' of the nineties". Between 1992 and 1994, coverage alleging fighting between Doherty and her co-stars dominated tabloid headlines, particularly concerning her heated feud with Jennie Garth, and further reports of heavy partying, arriving late to work, and physical fights. The zine Ben Is Dead, which published a newsletter called "I Hate Brenda" at the height of the show's popularity, opened a hotline called the "Shannen Snitch Line" to which people could call in and report gossip about Doherty.

This reputation gained further ground during her three seasons on Charmed, when tabloids fueled rumors of a feud between Doherty and her co-star Alyssa Milano. In both instances, Doherty acrimoniously departed from the shows after a few seasons; on Charmed, she was allegedly fired by producer Aaron Spelling after he received an ultimatum from Milano.

90210 executive producers Darren Star and Charles Rosin both confirmed that Doherty was difficult to work with on-set; Rosin commented "... she had habitual lateness. Her lateness was appalling, and she had a callous attitude and an indifference." Years later, Jennie Garth said of her relationship with Doherty, "There were times that we loved each other and there were times that we wanted to claw each other's eyes out". At one point in 1993, an argument between Doherty and Garth on the Beverly Hills, 90210 set escalated into physical violence. Nonetheless, Garth said the feud was mutual and based more on immaturity than true animosity, and that the two had gone on to become friends. Doherty, for her part, admitted to making mistakes, blaming her behavior on the pressures of fame, her youth, and problems in her personal life. In 2010, she stated: "I have a rep. Did I earn it? Yeah, I did. But, after a while you sort of try to shed that rep because you're kind of a different person. You've evolved and all of the bad things you've done in your life have brought you to a much better place."

Her dysfunctional reputation inspired the Billy Bermingham–written farce Shannen Doherty Shoots a Porno: A Shockumentary, which featured Alexandra Billings and was performed at Chicago's Torso Theatre from 1994 to 1997.

== Health problems and death ==
In 1999, Doherty revealed she had been diagnosed with Crohn's disease.

In March 2015, Doherty was diagnosed with breast cancer. According to Doherty, her business manager at the time had failed to make her insurance payments on time, causing her coverage to lapse from 2014 to 2015, and resulting in the cancer not being diagnosed until it had already spread significantly. In February 2016, Doherty revealed she was receiving anti-estrogen treatment to shrink the tumor and enable treatment by lumpectomy rather than mastectomy. However, the presence of multiple tumors meant a lumpectomy was not possible, and a unilateral mastectomy was performed in May 2016. Surgery revealed some of the cancer cells might have spread beyond the lymph nodes. Because the cancer was more advanced than previously thought, Doherty underwent chemotherapy and radiotherapy following surgery. On April 29, 2017, Doherty announced her cancer was in remission.

On February 4, 2020, Doherty announced her cancer had returned a year earlier, had metastasized, and had advanced to stage IV. In June 2023, she announced the cancer had spread to her brain and had become terminal. In November 2023, she revealed the cancer had spread to her bones. In January 2024, Doherty shared that she was undergoing a new cancer treatment and that it was successfully breaking through the blood–brain barrier, calling it a miracle.

On July 13, 2024, Doherty died from cancer at her home in Malibu, California at age 53. As per her wishes, she was cremated.

== Legacy ==
About a week before her death, Doherty recorded five episodes for The House of Halliwell, a Charmed rewatch podcast, which she helped to fund. She joined it as a co-host alongside Holly Marie Combs, Brian Krause and Drew Fuller. These episodes were released posthumously as the podcast description explains: "This show, this character, this podcast meant so much to Shannen she couldn't wait to share it with Charmed fans everywhere." They honored her memory by releasing the first five episodes she recorded prior to her death. In the episode titled "Remembering Shannen Doherty", her best friend Combs revealed that she refused to be remembered as "the actress who had cancer", but she would rather be recognized for her animal activism, as one of Doherty's final efforts was "trying to establish a sanctuary for wild horses".

In the aftermath of her death, several French television channels cancelled their programs to pay tribute to Doherty, a "pop culture icon". 6ter held a special tribute night, airing a documentary, the first four episodes of Charmed and her debut episode on Little House on the Prairie. The rating success was such that the channel decided to rebroadcast Charmed three days later, every Friday night instead of Hawaii Five-0. AB1 aired five episodes of Beverly Hills, 90210.
