= Our House (American TV series) =

Television series

- Genre: Drama
- Created by: James Lee Barrett
- Starring: Wilford Brimley; Deidre Hall; Shannen Doherty; Chad Allen; Keri Houlihan; Gerald S. O'Loughlin
- Theme music composer: Billy Goldenberg
- Composer: Joel McNeely
- Country of origin: United States
- Original language: English
- No. of seasons: 2
- No. of episodes: 46

Production
- Producer: Frank Fischer
- Camera setup: Single-camera
- Running time: 60 minutes
- Production companies: Blinn/Thorpe Productions; Lorimar-Telepictures

Original release
- Network: NBC
- Release: September 11, 1986 – May 8, 1988

Our House is an American drama television series that aired on NBC for two seasons from September 11, 1986, to May 8, 1988. The series centers on the Witherspoon family and the challenges they face adjusting to life with three generations living in the same house.

The series was created by James Lee Barrett.

== Synopsis ==
After his son John dies, retired widower Gus Witherspoon (Wilford Brimley) invites his daughter-in-law Jessie (Deidre Hall) and her three children to move to Los Angeles and live with him until Jessie gets back on her feet financially.

Despite protests from her children, fifteen-year-old Kris (Shannen Doherty); twelve-year-old David (Chad Allen); and eight-year-old Molly (Keri Houlihan) they, Jessie, and their basset hound Arthur leave Fort Wayne, Indiana, to start a new life in California. As they settle in with Gus, they realize just how difficult he can be to live with. The majority of the plots each week centers on the conflicts which tend to arise when an extended family must live together in the same house. As man of the house, Gus imposes rules on his three grandkids the same way he had raised John (and also John's brother Ben, who is seen in a two part episode); ultimately, however, he learns ways of conveying lessons to the kids without being gruff. Jessie and the kids eventually learn that beneath Gus' stern facade is a wise man, well versed in the ways of the world, who cares about them very much.

Each of the episode's five acts (before the commercial break) ends with a freeze frame shot which then occupies one of several rooms in an abstract rendering of a house figure. As the episode unfolds, more rooms are filled until finally—when the dilemma has been resolved—the final piece is put in place, completing the house.

John Witherspoon (played by Patrick Duffy) is seen in one episode and in the occasional flashback.

== Cast ==
- Wilford Brimley as Gus Witherspoon
- Deidre Hall as Jessica "Jessie" Witherspoon
- Shannen Doherty as Kris Witherspoon
- Chad Allen as David Witherspoon
- Keri Houlihan as Molly Witherspoon
- Gerald S. O'Loughlin as Joe Kaplan

== Episodes ==
=== Season 1 (1986–1987) ===
| No. overall | No. in season | Title | Directed by | Written by | Original release date |
|---|---|---|---|---|---|
| 1 | 1 | "Home Again" | Jerry Thorpe | James Lee Barrett | September 11, 1986 |
| 2 | 2 | "The Money Machine" | Harry Harris | Jerry McNeely | September 14, 1986 |
| 3 | 3 | "Families and Friends" | Harry Harris | James Lee Barrett | September 21, 1986 |
| 4 | 4 | "That Lonesome Old Caboose" | William Scheerer | William Blinn | September 28, 1986 |
| 5 | 5 | "The Third Question" | Robert Scheerer | James Lee Barrett | October 5, 1986 |
| 6 | 6 | "See You in Court" | Robert Scheerer | Jerry McNeely | October 12, 1986 |
| 7 | 7 | "Small Steps up a Small Mountain" | Ray Austin | William Blinn | October 19, 1986 |
| 8 | 8 | "Choices" | Robert Scheerer | Scott Finkelstein | October 26, 1986 |
| 9 | 9 | "First Impressions" | Robert Scheerer | Christopher Beaumont | November 2, 1986 |
| 10 | 10 | "Different Habits" | Ray Austin | William Colombo | November 9, 1986 |
| 11 | 11 | "Off We Go..." | Robert Scheerer | Parke Perine | November 16, 1986 |
| 12 | 12 | "Heart of a Dancer" | Ray Austin | Peter Tauber | November 23, 1986 |
| 13 | 13 | "Green Christmas" | William F. Claxton | Lee H. Grant & Jerry McNeely & Parke Perine | December 14, 1986 |
| 14 | 14 | "Family Secrets" | Ray Austin | Joel J. Feigenbaum | January 4, 1987 |
| 15 | 15 | "A Point of View" | Bruce Kessler | Jerry McNeely | January 11, 1987 |
| 16 | 16 | "The Best Intentions" | Ray Austin | William Colombo | January 18, 1987 |
| 17 | 17 | "The 100 Year Old Weekend" | Noel Nosseck | William Blinn | February 1, 1987 |
Gus feels progress has spun out of control and challenges his family to spend a weekend using only nothing invented or contrived within "the last 100 years". The family enjoys understanding the quaint ways of their Scottish ancestors, but David and Kris confess to breaking it when in town people crowded around an electronics store where a big screen TV broadcast news of a heightened US/Soviet tensions.
| 18 | 18 | "Past Tense, Future Tense: Part 1" | Ray Austin | William Blinn & Jerry McNeely | February 8, 1987 |
Kris wins a radio contest and gets a trip to Edwards Air Force base along with Gus as her chaperone. An airman offers to take her flying in a light plane, which turns into a disaster when mechanical failure causes them to crash into the mountains.
| 19 | 19 | "Past Tense, Future Tense: Part 2" | Ray Austin | Lee H. Grant & Parke Perine | February 15, 1987 |
Gus and a forest ranger (William Katt) Who is also his estranged younger son Ben explore the mountain range in search of Kris and the lost airman.
| 20 | 20 | "Friends" | Nick Havinga | Lee H. Grant & Parke Perine | February 22, 1987 |
| 21 | 21 | "Giving 'em the Business" | Roy Campanella II | Kim C. Friese | March 1, 1987 |
| 22 | 22 | "Growing Up, Growing Old" | Nick Havinga | Lee H. Grant & Parke Perine | March 15, 1987 |
| 23 | 23 | "The Road out of Briarpatch" | Roy Campenella II | Kim C. Friese | March 22, 1987 |
| 24 | 24 | "The Children's Crusade" | Jerry Thorpe | Peter Tauber | May 3, 1987 |

=== Season 2 (1987–1988) ===
| No. overall | No. in season | Title | Directed by | Written by | Original release date |
|---|---|---|---|---|---|
| 25 | 1 | "Sounds from a Silent Clock: Part 1" | Ray Austin | Jerry McNeely & William Blinn | September 13, 1987 |
| 26 | 2 | "Sounds from a Silent Clock: Part 2" | Ray Austin | William Schwartz & E.F. Wallengren | September 20, 1987 |
| 27 | 3 | "A Silent, Fallen Tree" | Chuck Arnold | William Blinn | September 27, 1987 |
| 28 | 4 | "Dancing in the Dark" | Chuck Arnold | Lee H. Grant | October 4, 1987 |
| 29 | 5 | "The Witherspoon War" | Ray Austin | Jerry McNeely | October 18, 1987 |
| 30 | 6 | "The Haunting" | Win Phelps | E.F. Wallengren | October 25, 1987 |
| 31 | 7 | "Candles and Shadows" | Chuck Arnold | William Blinn | November 1, 1987 |
| 32 | 8 | "They Also Serve" | Ray Austin | Kim C. Friese | November 8, 1987 |
| 33 | 9 | "The Springtown Treasure" | Chuck Arnold | E.F. Wallengren | November 15, 1987 |
| 34 | 10 | "Call It a Draw" | Ray Austin | Michael Marks | November 22, 1987 |
| 35 | 11 | "Like Father, Like Son" | Chuck Arnold | William Schmidt | November 29, 1987 |
| 36 | 12 | "Sunday's Hero, Monday's Goat" | James Lee Barrett | William A. Schwartz | December 6, 1987 |
| 37 | 13 | "Balance of Power" | Ray Austin | Claire Whitaker | January 10, 1988 |
| 38 | 14 | "Finish the Day" | Chuck Arnold | Jerry McNeely | January 24, 1988 |
| 39 | 15 | "Two-Beat, Four-Beat" | Win Phelps | E.F. Wallengren & Jerry McNeely | February 7, 1988 |
| 40 | 16 | "Trouble in Paradise: Part 1" | Ray Austin | William Blinn & Jerry McNeely | February 14, 1988 |
| 41 | 17 | "Trouble in Paradise: Part 2" | Ray Austin | Lee H. Grant & E.F. Wallengren | February 21, 1988 |
| 42 | 18 | "Out of Step" | Nick Havinga | Lee H. Grant | February 28, 1988 |
| 43 | 19 | "The Ashton Street Gang" | Ray Austin | E.F. Wallengren | March 6, 1988 |
| 44 | 20 | "The Fifth Beatle" | Nick Havinga | Jerry McNeely | March 13, 1988 |
| 45 | 21 | "Neighborhood Watch" | David Huddleston | Kim C. Friese | May 1, 1988 |
| 46 | 22 | "Artful Dodging" | Chuck Arnold | Joel J. Feigenbaum | May 8, 1988 |

== Reception ==
Upon the show's 1986 premiere, the Associated Press called it "a family show suitable for framing." Despite positive reviews by newspaper critics and a promising start, the series was not a ratings success, likely because of NBC scheduling it on Sundays at 7 PM (EST) opposite CBS's powerhouse 60 Minutes and numerous overruns by NFL games on its own network. The series ranked 59th in its first season (12.9 rating) and 71st in its second (10.9 rating).

The Inspiration Network re-aired the show in the US from October 18, 2010, to December 31, 2011. Prior to that, reruns of the show aired on The Family Channel in the early 1990s and on the Faith & Values Channel, Pax TV and Odyssey Channel later that decade.
