= David Tutera's Celebrations =

- Season 6 Logo
- Also known as: My Fair Wedding; My Fair Wedding: Unveiled; David Tutera: Unveiled
- Genre: Reality television
- Starring: David Tutera
- Narrated by: Sarah Lafleur
- Country of origin: United States
- Original language: English
- No. of seasons: 8
- No. of episodes: 117

Production
- Executive producers: Craig Piligian; Melodie Calvert; Lauren P. Gellert; Kate Farrell
- Running time: 40-43 minutes
- Production company: Pilgrim Studios

Original release
- Network: WE tv
- Release: October 26, 2008 – September 28, 2018

David Tutera's Celebrations (originally titled My Fair Wedding) is an American reality television series on WE tv starring David Tutera, a wedding planner for celebrities. In the show, women send videos to Tutera asking for help planning their events. After selecting the woman, he goes to help them, and puts his own touch to the plans, creating a "dream event" for each woman. He makes his alterations with just three weeks before each woman's event.

The show premiered in October 2008 under the title My Fair Wedding. The first two seasons profiled women and weddings in the New York City metro area, while the third took the series on the road, helping brides-to-be in Dallas and Los Angeles, among other places. The series' title was changed to My Fair Wedding: Unveiled for season 5. It was announced in March 2013 that the series has been renewed for an eight episode sixth season and that features all types of events, not just limited to weddings. Season 6 also features another series title change to David Tutera: Unveiled. It premiered on September 7, 2013.

The seventh season brings a third series title change to David Tutera's CELEBrations. Season 7 will consist of seventeen episodes and follows Tutera as he helps Hollywood stars plan their events. Clients this season include Brandy Norwood, Ray J, Lil Kim, Taylor Armstrong, and Amy Weber's twins. It premiered on August 1, 2014.

== Episodes ==
=== Series overview ===
Season	Episodes	Originally released	
Season	Episodes	First released	Last released
1	6	October 26, 2008	November 30, 2008
2	12	September 27, 2009	December 13, 2009
3	24	June 6, 2010	March 20, 2011
4	18	November 13, 2011	April 1, 2012
5	13	September 8, 2012	December 15, 2012
6	8	September 7, 2013	October 26, 2013
7	17	August 1, 2014	February 20, 2015
8	26	October 30, 2015	September 28, 2018

=== Season 1 (2008) ===
No. overall	No. in season	Title	Original release date
1	1	"Jennifer Coppola"	October 26, 2008
2	2	"Mandy Ferrer"	November 2, 2008
3	3	"Wanda Ortiz"	November 9, 2008
4	4	"Seria"	November 16, 2008
5	5	"Amanda"	November 23, 2008
6	6	"Bayyina Joseph"	November 30, 2008

=== Season 2 (2009) ===
No. overall	No. in season	Title	Original release date
7	1	"Caroline"	September 27, 2009
8	2	"Nicole"	October 4, 2009
9	3	"Quiana"	October 11, 2009
10	4	"Kricket"	October 18, 2009
11	5	"Dayira"	October 25, 2009
12	6	"Lauren"	November 1, 2009
13	7	"Jamie"	November 8, 2009
14	8	"Bernadette"	November 15, 2009
15	9	"Christina"	November 22, 2009
16	10	"Noelle"	November 29, 2009
17	11	"Corryn"	December 6, 2009
18	12	"Varneka"	December 13, 2009

=== Season 3 (2010–11) ===
No. overall	No. in season	Title	Original release date
19	1	"Poker Bride"	June 6, 2010
20	2	"Spring Bride"	June 13, 2010
21	3	"Great Gatsby Bride"	June 20, 2010
22	4	"Zen Bride"	June 27, 2010
23	5	"Swamp Bride"	July 4, 2010
24	6	"Diva Bride"	July 11, 2010
25	7	"Cowboy Bride"	July 18, 2010
26	8	"Pirate Bride"	July 25, 2010
27	9	"Purple Princess Bride"	August 1, 2010
28	10	"Butterfly Bride"	August 8, 2010
29	11	"Day of the Dead Bride"	August 15, 2010
30	12	"Greek Goddess Bride"	August 22, 2010
31	13	"A Superstar Is Born"	January 2, 2011
32	14	"A Phantom of a Wedding"	January 8, 2011
33	15	"A Wonderland Wedding"	January 16, 2011
34	16	"Off to See the Wizard"	January 23, 2011
35	17	"Safari Bride"	January 30, 2011
36	18	"Breast Cancer Survivors and 1950s Havana Bride"	February 6, 2011
37	19	"Mini-Truck Bride"	February 13, 2011
38	20	"Winter Wonderland Bride"	February 20, 2011
39	21	"Hearts Bride"	February 27, 2011
40	22	"Monopoly Bride"	March 6, 2011
41	23	"Belly Dancing Bride"	March 13, 2011
42	24	"Royal Bride"	March 20, 2011

=== Season 4 (2011–12) ===
No. overall	No. in season	Title	Original release date
43	1	"Make a Wish Bride"	November 13, 2011
44	2	"Fashionista Bride"	November 20, 2011
45	3	"Goth Bride"	November 27, 2011
46	4	"Tuscany Bride"	December 4, 2011
47	5	"Dragonfly Bride"	December 11, 2011
48	6	"Hollywood Glam Bride"	December 18, 2011
49	7	"April in Paris Bride"	January 1, 2012
50	8	"Motown Bride"	January 8, 2012
51	9	"Picnic Wedding Bride"	January 15, 2012
52	10	"Hawaiian Luau Bride"	January 22, 2012
53	11	"Shabby Chic Bride"	January 29, 2012
54	12	"Snow White Bride"	February 12, 2012
55	13	"Control Bride"	February 19, 2012
56	14	"Asian Fusion Bride"	March 4, 2012
57	15	"Mad Men Bride"	March 11, 2012
58	16	"Masquerade Bride"	March 18, 2012
59	17	"Under the Sea Bride"	March 25, 2012
60	18	"Paint the Wedding Red Bride"	April 1, 2012

=== Season 5 (2012) ===
No. overall	No. in season	Title	Original release date
61	1	"Burlesque Bride"	September 8, 2012
62	2	"Mermaid Bride"	September 15, 2012
63	3	"Mexican Polynesian Wedding"	September 22, 2012
64	4	"Traveling Teacher Bride"	September 29, 2012
65	5	"Heaven and Earth Bride"	October 6, 2012
66	6	"Ancient Rome Bride"	October 13, 2012
67	7	"David, Divas and Disasters"	October 20, 2012
68	8	"Inspired by Kim K"	October 27, 2012
69	9	"Momzilla"	November 3, 2012
70	10	"Baroque, Pin-Ups and Hot Rods"	November 10, 2012
71	11	"Best Brides"	November 17, 2012
72	12	"Bollywood BBQ"	December 1, 2012
73	13	"Family Feud Bride"	December 8, 2012
74	14	"Brenchel"	December 15, 2012

=== Season 6 (2013) ===
No. overall	No. in season	Title	Original release date
74	1	"Showstopper Bride"	September 7, 2013
75	2	"Mama Drama"	September 14, 2013
76	3	"Runaway Bride"	September 21, 2013
77	4	"Beverly Hills Bat Mitzvah"	September 28, 2013
78	5	"Internet Bride"	October 5, 2013
79	6	"Wonderland Wedding"	October 12, 2013
80	7	"Super Sweet Sixteen Plus 1"	October 19, 2013
81	8	"Nik and Shayne's Immaculate Reception"	October 26, 2013

=== Season 7 (2014–15) ===
No. overall	No. in season	Title	Original release date
82	1	"Real Housewife, Real Problems"	August 1, 2014
83	2	"Wowing JWoww"	August 8, 2014
84	3	"Queen B's Baby Bash"	August 15, 2014
85	4	"Brandy and Ray J's Family Feud"	August 22, 2014
86	5	"Alexis Bellino Dress Meltdown & Cielo's B-Day"	September 5, 2014
87	6	"Wrestler's Winter Wonderland"	September 12, 2014
88	7	"Tanisha's Divorce Party"	September 19, 2014
89	8	"David's First Ambush Wedding"	September 26, 2014
90	9	"Vanessa Simmons' 31st Birthday Blowout"	October 3, 2014
91	10	"Perez Hilton's 10-Year Anniversary Bash"	January 9, 2015
92	11	"Omarosa's Holiday Fundraiser"	January 16, 2015
93	12	"China Anne McClain's Sweet 16"	January 23, 2015
94	13	"Holly Robinson Peete"	January 30, 2015
95	14	"Dennis Rodman"	February 6, 2015
96	15	"Jill Zarin"	February 13, 2015
97	16	"Porsha Williams: Atlanta Housewife"	February 19, 2015
98	17	"Angie Everhart's Wedding"	February 20, 2015

=== Season 8 (2015–16; 2018) ===
No. overall	No. in season	Title	Original release date
99	1	"Vanessa Williams"	October 30, 2015
100	2	"Ian Ziering"	November 6, 2015
101	3	"Cynthia Bailey"	November 13, 2015
102	4	"Leslie Jones; Montré"	November 20, 2015
103	5	"Reza Farahan"	December 4, 2015
104	6	"Kim Coles"	December 11, 2015
105	7	"Big Ang"	December 18, 2015
106	9	"Tori Spelling"	March 11, 2016
107	10	"Daymond John"	March 11, 2016
108	11	"Iyanla Vanzant"	March 18, 2016
109	12	"Sundy Carter"	March 18, 2016
110	13	"Gary Busey"	March 25, 2016
111	14	"Gary Busey Part 2; David's Birthday"	March 25, 2016
112	15	"Buddy Valastro"	April 27, 2018
113	16	"Zendaya"	May 4, 2018
114	17	"tWitch & Allison"	May 11, 2018
115	18	"Heidi & Spencer Pratt"	May 18, 2018
116	19	"Vivica A. Fox"	August 3, 2018
117	20	"Niecy Nash"	August 10, 2018
118	21	"Ice-T & Coco"	August 17, 2018
119	22	"Mario Lopez"	August 24, 2018
120	23	"Wendy Raquel Robinson"	September 7, 2018
121	24	"Kim Kimble"	September 14, 2018
122	25	"Boris Kodjoe & Nicole Ari Parker"	September 21, 2018
123	26	"Kym Whitley"	September 28, 2018
