= David Tutera =

American fashion designer

- Born: April 23, 1966 (age 60); Port Chester, New York
- Occupations: Wedding planner, TV host
- Spouses: Ryan Jurica (m. 2003; sep. 2013) Joey Toth (m. 2017; div. 2026)
- Children: 2

David Tutera (born April 23, 1966) is an American celebrity wedding planner, and host of the TV show My Fair Wedding with David Tutera and David Tutera's CELEBrations.

== Biography ==
In September 2003, he married Ryan Jurica in Vermont. The couple separated on New Year’s Day 2013, shortly after their surrogate became pregnant. That year Tutera's daughter and Jurica's son were born. On April 1, 2017, Tutera married Joey Toth, and they resided together in Los Angeles. Tutera and Toth divorced in June 2026.

Currently in its 9th season, My Fair Wedding with David Tutera airs on WE tv. The show would end in 2018.

David has been awarded "Best Celebrity Wedding Planner" by Life & Style Magazine.
