= Blind Spot (Beverly Hills, 90210) =

- Beverly Hills, 90210 episode
- Episode no.: Season 4 Episode 26
- Directed by: Michael Lange
- Written by: Ken Stringer
- Original air date: April 6, 1994
- Running time: 46 minutes

Guest appearances
- Jack Armstrong; Cress Williams; Todd Bryant; Sydney Brown

"Blind Spot" is a 1994 episode of the American television series Beverly Hills, 90210. The episode follows two stories. In the first, series regular David Silver finds himself attracted to his blind piano teacher, causing a strain on his relationship with girlfriend Donna Martin. In the second, series regular Steve Sanders discovers that Mike Ryan, the president of his college fraternity, is gay, and outs him to the rest of the fraternity. The 26th episode of season 4, "Blind Spot" originally aired on April 6, 1994 on Fox.

== Plot ==
David Silver is having trouble practicing a Mozart sonata so he seeks out help from Holly Marlow, a piano teacher who he quickly realizes is blind. He develops feelings for her, slighting his girlfriend Donna Martin in the process. Holly explains to David that he is confusing feelings of protectiveness because of her disability for romantic feelings.

Steve Sanders and Brandon Walsh are on their way to Dodger Stadium for a baseball game when Brandon's car breaks down. They go into a nearby coffee house to call for help and Steve figures out that it's a gay establishment. He spots Mike Ryan, the president of his fraternity, and Mike spots him as well. Back at the fraternity house Mike asks Steve not to mention his sexuality to the fraternity brothers. At a wardrobe fitting for a charity beefcake calendar, fraternity brother Artie Devers gay-baits Steve, who in response outs Mike. Artie leads an attempt to expel Mike from the fraternity but Steve, extolling the principle of brotherhood, persuades the fraternity to keep Mike.

== Guest cast ==
- Jack Armstrong as Mike Ryan
- Cress Williams as D'Shawn Hardell
- Todd Bryant as Artie Devers
- Sydney Brown as Holly Marlow

== Impact ==
Gender studies writer E. Graham McKinley has examined "Blind Spot" for its portrayal of gender relationship dynamics between diverse pairings, specifically David's interaction with the disabled Holly and a date between Donna and recurring African-American character D'Shawn Hardell.

In partnership with the Los Angeles chapter of the Gay & Lesbian Alliance Against Defamation, the producers of Beverly Hills, 90210 sponsored screenings of "Blind Spot" at three gay and lesbian youth centers in the Los Angeles area. Following each screening, executive producer Chuck Rosin and guest star Todd Bryant participated in a question-and-answer session.
