= Breaking Up with Shannen Doherty =

- Genre: Reality
- Starring: Shannen Doherty
- Country of origin: United States
- No. of seasons: 1
- No. of episodes: 13

Production
- Executive producers: Kevin Healey; Scott Hallock
- Running time: 30 minutes
- Production company: Hallock-Healey Entertainment

Original release
- Network: Oxygen
- Release: August 22 – November 7, 2006

Breaking Up with Shannen Doherty is an American reality television series on Oxygen Network. The series debuted on August 22, 2006.

== Overview ==
In the series, actress Shannen Doherty joins forces with people in a relationship peril who want to get out but just can not seem to do it on their own. She listens to the plight of her new "client" and put their mates to the test by creating a fictitious situation - caught by a hidden camera - to determine the true character of the relationship. If the test is failed, Doherty then helps put the relationship out of its misery.

In each episode, Doherty helps mastermind the break-up, and be on the scene to deliver the news and resolve the break-up. The goal at the end is for both parties to agree that it's all for the best and it's time to move on.

== Episodes ==
| No. | Title | Original release date |
|---|---|---|
| 1 | "Line Up, Let Go/Breaking Up for Shannen" | August 22, 2006 |
| 2 | "Hungry for Love/Need My Helpline" | August 22, 2006 |
| 3 | "You Be the Judge/Consortium" | August 29, 2006 |
| 4 | "Based on a True Story/He Said, She Said" | September 5, 2006 |
| 5 | "FBI Sting/Reality Check" | September 12, 2006 |
| 6 | "You Need My Help/Chemistry Test" | September 19, 2006 |
| 7 | "Better Off/Insecurity Check" | September 26, 2006 |
| 8 | "Who Said What?; Drag It Out" | October 3, 2006 |
| 9 | "Jury of Your Peers" | October 10, 2006 |
| 10 | "The Survey; Focus Group" | October 17, 2006 |
| 11 | "Technical Difficulties; Tragedy Plus Time" | October 24, 2006 |
| 12 | "Meet My Parents; Crash" | October 31, 2006 |
| 13 | "Psychic; Dancing With Myself" | November 7, 2006 |
