= Dancing with the Stars (American TV series) season 10 =

Dancing with the Stars
- Season 10
- Promotional poster, featuring former pro dancers Edyta Śliwińska and Alec Mazo
- Hosted by: Tom Bergeron; Brooke Burke
- Judges: Carrie Ann Inaba; Len Goodman; Bruno Tonioli
- Celebrity winner: Nicole Scherzinger
- Professional winner: Derek Hough
- No. of episodes: 19

Release
- Original network: ABC
- Original release: March 22 – May 25, 2010

Season chronology
- ← Previous; Season 9 Next → Season 11

Season ten of Dancing with the Stars premiered on March 22, 2010, on the ABC network.

The Pussycat Dolls singer Nicole Scherzinger and Derek Hough won the competition, while Olympic figure skater Evan Lysacek and Anna Trebunskaya finished second, and ESPN host Erin Andrews and Maksim Chmerkovskiy finished third.

== Cast ==
=== Couples ===
This season featured eleven celebrity contestants. Damian Whitewood, from the Broadway dance revue Burn the Floor, joined the cast of professionals this season. Ashly DelGrosso Costa, whose last season as a pro was season three, also returned, while Edyta Śliwińska continued as the longest-tenured professional on the show, having appeared on all of the first ten seasons.

Celebrity	Notability	Professional partner	Status
Shannen Doherty	Film & television actress	Mark Ballas	Eliminated 1st on March 30, 2010
Buzz Aldrin	Apollo 11 astronaut	Ashly Costa	Eliminated 2nd on April 6, 2010
Aiden Turner	All My Children actor	Edyta Śliwińska	Eliminated 3rd on April 13, 2010
Kate Gosselin	Reality television personality	Tony Dovolani	Eliminated 4th on April 20, 2010
Jake Pavelka	The Bachelor star	Chelsie Hightower	Eliminated 5th on April 27, 2010
Pamela Anderson	Playboy model & actress	Damian Whitewood	Eliminated 6th on May 4, 2010
Niecy Nash	Comedian, actress & host	Louis van Amstel	Eliminated 7th on May 11, 2010
Chad Ochocinco	NFL wide receiver	Cheryl Burke	Eliminated 8th on May 18, 2010
Erin Andrews	ESPN sportscaster	Maksim Chmerkovskiy	Third place on May 24, 2010
Evan Lysacek	Olympic figure skater	Anna Trebunskaya	Runners-up on May 25, 2010
Nicole Scherzinger	Pussycat Dolls singer	Derek Hough	Winners on May 25, 2010

Future appearances

Pamela Anderson returned for the All-Stars season, where she was paired with Tristan MacManus.

=== Host and judges ===
Samantha Harris did not return as co-host for this season due to her commitments on The Insider and Entertainment Tonight. On March 8, 2010, Tom Bergeron announced on Good Morning America that his new co-host would be season seven champion Brooke Burke. Len Goodman, Carrie Ann Inaba, and Bruno Tonioli all returned as judges.

== Scoring chart ==
The highest score each week is indicated in bold green with a dagger (†), while the lowest score each week is indicated in italicized red with a double-dagger (‡).

Color key:

Winners
Runners-up
Third place
Bottom two
Eliminated

Dancing with the Stars (season 10) - Weekly scores
Couple	Pl.	Week											
Couple	Pl.	1	2	1+2	3	4 (Note: Each couple received two scores from the judges this week: one for technical and one for performance.)	5	6	7	8	9	10	
Couple	Pl.	1	2	1+2	3	4	5	6	7	8	9	Night 1	Night 2
Nicole & Derek	1st	**25**†	**28**†	**53**†	23	25+25=50	**29**†	26+10=**36**†	27+27=**54**†	29+30=**59**†	30+29=**59**†	28+27+30=**85**†	+30=**115**† (Note: This couple finished in first place.)
Evan & Anna	2nd	23	24	47	**26**†	26+26=**52**†	27	21+6=27	30+24=**54**†	27+26=53	29+30=**59**†	28+24+28=80‡	+28=108‡ (Note: This couple finished in second place.)
Erin & Maks	3rd	21	23	44	23	18+21=39	22	25+9=34	27+24=51 (Note: This couple was in the bottom two, but was not eliminated.)	28+25=53	27+29=56	29+26+26=81 (Note: This couple finished in third place.)	
Chad & Cheryl	4th	18	16	34	20	21+23=44	18	24+7=31	25+27=52	21+24=45	27+25=52‡ (Note: This couple was eliminated.)		
Niecy & Louis	5th	18	21	39	21	18+18=36	18	21+5=26	25+24=49‡	23+20=43‡			
Pamela & Damian	6th	21	22	43	21	23+24=47	21	22+8=30	24+27=51				
Jake & Chelsie	7th	20	20	40	21	19+19=38	23	21+4=25‡					
Kate & Tony	8th	16	15	31	15	14+18=32‡	15‡						
Aiden & Edyta	9th	15	19	34	20	15+18=33							
Buzz & Ashly	10th	14‡	12‡	26‡	13‡								
Shannen & Mark	11th	18	20	38									

== Weekly scores ==
Individual judges' scores in the charts below (given in parentheses) are listed in this order from left to right: Carrie Ann Inaba, Len Goodman, Bruno Tonioli.

=== Week 1: First Dances ===
Each couple performed either the cha-cha-cha or Viennese waltz. Couples are listed in the order they performed.

Couple	Scores	Dance	Music
Chad & Cheryl	18 (6, 6, 6)	Cha-cha-cha	"It's Just Begun" — The Jimmy Castor Bunch
Shannen & Mark	18 (6, 6, 6)	Viennese waltz	"The Killing Moon" — Nouvelle Vague
Erin & Maks	21 (7, 7, 7)	Cha-cha-cha	"TiK ToK" — Ke$ha
Jake & Chelsie	20 (7, 6, 7)	Viennese waltz	"Kiss from a Rose" — Seal
Niecy & Louis	18 (7, 5, 6)	Cha-cha-cha	"Rescue Me" — Fontella Bass
Evan & Anna	23 (8, 7, 8)	Viennese waltz	"I'll Be" — Edwin McCain
Buzz & Ashly	14 (5, 4, 5)	Cha-cha-cha	"Cupid" — Sam Cooke
Nicole & Derek	25 (9, 7, 9)	Viennese waltz	"Hold You In My Arms" ― Ray LaMontagne
Aiden & Edyta	15 (5, 5, 5)	Cha-cha-cha	"Hungry Like the Wolf" — Duran Duran
Kate & Tony	16 (6, 5, 5)	Viennese waltz	"She's Always a Woman" — Billy Joel
Pamela & Damian	21 (7, 6, 8)	Cha-cha-cha	"Gimme All Your Lovin'" — ZZ Top

=== Week 2: First Elimination ===
Each couple performed either the foxtrot or jive. Couples are listed in the order they performed.

Couple	Scores	Dance	Music	Result
Shannen & Mark	20 (7, 6, 7)	Jive	"Shake a Tail Feather" — Ray Charles	Eliminated
Aiden & Edyta	19 (7, 6, 6)	Foxtrot	"I've Got You Under My Skin" — Frank Sinatra	Safe
Evan & Anna	24 (8, 8, 8)	Jive	"The Best Damn Thing" — Avril Lavigne	Safe
Niecy & Louis	21 (7, 7, 7)	Foxtrot	"Love You I Do" — Jennifer Hudson	Safe
Jake & Chelsie	20 (6, 7, 7)	Jive	"Hip to be Square" — Huey Lewis and the News	Safe
Buzz & Ashly	12 (4, 4, 4)	Foxtrot	"Fly Me to the Moon" — Frank Sinatra	Safe
Nicole & Derek	28 (10, 8, 10)	Jive	"SOS" — Rihanna	Safe
Erin & Maks	23 (8, 7, 8)	Foxtrot	"Love Story" — Taylor Swift	Safe
Pamela & Damian	22 (7, 7, 8)	Foxtrot	"I Wanna Be Loved By You" — Marilyn Monroe	Bottom two
Chad & Cheryl	16 (6, 5, 5)	Foxtrot	"100 Years" — Five for Fighting	Safe
Kate & Tony	15 (5, 5, 5)	Jive	"I'm Still Standing" — Elton John	Safe

=== Week 3: Storytelling Week ===
Each couple performed either the paso doble, quickstep, or waltz. Couples are listed in the order they performed.

Couple	Scores	Dance	Music	Result
Evan & Anna	26 (9, 8, 9)	Quickstep	"Hot Honey Rag" — from Chicago	Safe
Buzz & Ashly	13 (5, 4, 4)	Waltz	"What a Wonderful World" — Louis Armstrong	Eliminated
Jake & Chelsie	21 (7, 7, 7)	Quickstep	"Walk Like an Egyptian" — The Bangles	Bottom two
Niecy & Louis	21 (7, 7, 7)	Waltz	"With You I'm Born Again" — Billy Preston, feat. Syreeta Wright	Safe
Chad & Cheryl	20 (7, 6, 7)	Paso doble	"Canción del Mariachi" — Los Lobos & Antonio Banderas	Safe
Pamela & Damian	21 (7, 7, 7)	Paso doble	"Don't Let Me Be Misunderstood" — The Animals	Safe
Aiden & Edyta	20 (7, 6, 7)	Quickstep	"Hey, Soul Sister" — Train	Safe
Erin & Maks	23 (8, 7, 8)	Waltz	"See the Day" — Dee C. Lee	Safe
Kate & Tony	15 (5, 5, 5)	Paso doble	"Paparazzi" — Lady Gaga	Safe
Nicole & Derek	23 (8, 6, 9)	Quickstep	"Anything Goes" — Cole Porter, feat. Stacey Kent	Safe

=== Week 4: Double-score Week ===
Each couple performed either the rumba or tango, receiving two sets of scores from the judges: one for technical and one for performance. Couples are listed in the order they performed.

Couple	Technical scores & performance scores	Dance	Music	Result
Erin & Maks	18 (6, 6, 6)	Tango	"Sweet Dreams (Are Made of This)" — Eurythmics	Safe
Erin & Maks	21 (7, 7, 7)	Tango	"Sweet Dreams (Are Made of This)" — Eurythmics	Safe
Evan & Anna	26 (9, 8, 9)	Tango	"Wait a Minute" — The Pussycat Dolls, feat. Timbaland	Safe
Evan & Anna	26 (9, 8, 9)	Tango	"Wait a Minute" — The Pussycat Dolls, feat. Timbaland	Safe
Niecy & Louis	18 (6, 6, 6)	Rumba	"Taking Chances" — Celine Dion	Safe
Niecy & Louis	18 (6, 6, 6)	Rumba	"Taking Chances" — Celine Dion	Safe
Aiden & Edyta	15 (5, 5, 5)	Rumba	"Live Like We're Dying" — Kris Allen	Eliminated
Aiden & Edyta	18 (6, 6, 6)	Rumba	"Live Like We're Dying" — Kris Allen	Eliminated
Nicole & Derek	25 (9, 8, 8)	Rumba	"The First Time Ever I Saw Your Face" — Roberta Flack	Safe
Nicole & Derek	25 (8, 8, 9)	Rumba	"The First Time Ever I Saw Your Face" — Roberta Flack	Safe
Jake & Chelsie	19 (6, 7, 6)	Tango	"A Girl Like You" — Edwyn Collins	Safe
Jake & Chelsie	19 (7, 6, 6)	Tango	"A Girl Like You" — Edwyn Collins	Safe
Kate & Tony	14 (4, 5, 5)	Tango	"For Your Entertainment" — Adam Lambert	Safe
Kate & Tony	18 (6, 6, 6)	Tango	"For Your Entertainment" — Adam Lambert	Safe
Chad & Cheryl	21 (7, 6, 8)	Rumba	"Try Sleeping with a Broken Heart" — Alicia Keys	Safe
Chad & Cheryl	23 (8, 7, 8)	Rumba	"Try Sleeping with a Broken Heart" — Alicia Keys	Safe
Pamela & Damian	23 (7, 8, 8)	Rumba	"I Can't Make You Love Me" — Bonnie Raitt	Safe
Pamela & Damian	24 (8, 7, 9)	Rumba	"I Can't Make You Love Me" — Bonnie Raitt	Safe

=== Week 5: Movie Week ===
Each couple performed one unlearned dance. Couples are listed in the order they performed.

Couple	Scores	Dance	Music	Film	Result
Niecy & Louis	18 (6, 6, 6)	Jive	"La Bamba" — Ritchie Valens	La Bamba	Safe
Chad & Cheryl	18 (6, 6, 6)	Quickstep	"The Bare Necessities" — Phil Harris	The Jungle Book	Safe
Erin & Maks	22 (7, 7, 8)	Jive	"You Never Can Tell" — Chuck Berry	Pulp Fiction	Safe
Jake & Chelsie	23 (8, 7, 8)	Cha-cha-cha	"Old Time Rock and Roll" — Bob Seger	Risky Business	Safe
Pamela & Damian	21 (7, 6, 8)	Quickstep	"9 to 5" — Dolly Parton	9 to 5	Bottom two
Kate & Tony	15 (5, 5, 5)	Foxtrot	"Don't You (Forget About Me)" — Simple Minds	The Breakfast Club	Eliminated
Nicole & Derek	29 (10, 9, 10)	Tango	"Oh, Pretty Woman" — Roy Orbison	Pretty Woman	Safe
Evan & Anna	27 (9, 9, 9)	Rumba	"I Don't Want to Miss a Thing" — Aerosmith	Armageddon	Safe

=== Week 6: Marathon Week ===
Each couple performed either the Argentine tango or samba, plus a swing dance marathon for extra points. Couples are listed in the order they performed.

Couple	Scores	Dance	Music	Result
Jake & Chelsie	21 (7, 7, 7)	Samba	"Comanche" — The Revels	Eliminated
Evan & Anna	21 (7, 7, 7)	Samba	"Hey Mama" — The Black Eyed Peas	Safe
Niecy & Louis	21 (7, 7, 7)	Argentine tango	"El Sonido de la Milonga" — Campo	Bottom two
Erin & Maks	25 (9, 7, 9)	Samba	"When I Get You Alone" — Robin Thicke	Safe
Chad & Cheryl	24 (8, 8, 8)	Argentine tango	"Mas de lo Mismo" — Tanghetto	Safe
Nicole & Derek	26 (9, 7, 10)	Samba	"María" — Ricky Martin	Safe
Pamela & Damian	22 (7, 7, 8)	Argentine tango	"Enjoy the Silence" — Depeche Mode	Safe
Jake & Chelsie	4	Swing; Marathon	"In the Mood" — Ernie Fields	
Niecy & Louis	5	Swing; Marathon	"In the Mood" — Ernie Fields	
Evan & Anna	6	Swing; Marathon	"In the Mood" — Ernie Fields	
Chad & Cheryl	7	Swing; Marathon	"In the Mood" — Ernie Fields	
Pamela & Damian	8	Swing; Marathon	"In the Mood" — Ernie Fields	
Erin & Maks	9	Swing; Marathon	"In the Mood" — Ernie Fields	
Nicole & Derek	10	Swing; Marathon	"In the Mood" — Ernie Fields	

=== Week 7: Team Dance Week ===
Each couple performed one unlearned dance, plus a team cha-cha-cha. Couples are listed in the order they performed.

Couple	Scores	Dance	Music	Result
Erin & Maks	27 (9, 9, 9)	Quickstep	"Dancin' Fool" — Barry Manilow	Bottom two
Chad & Cheryl	25 (8, 9, 8)	Viennese waltz	"Sparks" — Coldplay	Safe
Nicole & Derek	27 (9, 9, 9)	Waltz	"You Light Up My Life" — Debby Boone	Safe
Pamela & Damian	24 (8, 8, 8)	Waltz	"At This Moment" — Billy & the Beaters	Eliminated
Niecy & Louis	25 (9, 8, 8)	Quickstep	"You're the Top" — Cole Porter	Safe
Evan & Anna	30 (10, 10, 10)	Argentine tango	"Bust Your Windows" — Jazmine Sullivan	Safe
Chad & Cheryl Nicole & Derek Pamela & Damian	27 (9, 9, 9)	Cha-cha-cha (Team Gaga)	"Telephone" — Lady Gaga, feat. Beyoncé	
Erin & Maks Evan & Anna Niecy & Louis	24 (8, 8, 8)	Cha-cha-cha (Team Madonna)	"Holiday" — Madonna	

=== Week 8: Race to the Semifinals ===
Each couple performed two unlearned dances, the second of which had to reflect the style of a particular era. Couples are listed in the order they performed.

Couple	Scores	Dance	Era	Music	Result
Chad & Cheryl	21 (7, 7, 7)	Tango		"Sweet Dreams" — Beyoncé	Safe
Chad & Cheryl	24 (8, 8, 8)	Jive	1960s	"Love Man" — Otis Redding	Safe
Niecy & Louis	23 (7, 8, 8)	Viennese waltz		"I Got You Babe" — Sonny & Cher	Eliminated
Niecy & Louis	20 (7, 6, 7)	Paso doble	1990s	"Rhythm is a Dancer" — Snap!	Eliminated
Erin & Maks	28 (9, 10, 9)	Argentine tango		"Una Música Brutal" — Gotan Project	Safe
Erin & Maks	25 (8, 8, 9)	Rumba	1980s	"Missing You" — John Waite	Safe
Evan & Anna	27 (9, 9, 9)	Waltz		"Open Arms" — Journey	Safe
Evan & Anna	26 (9, 8, 9)	Cha-cha-cha	Futuristic	"Bulletproof" — La Roux	Safe
Nicole & Derek	29 (10, 9, 10)	Foxtrot		"Haven't Met You Yet" — Michael Bublé	Safe
Nicole & Derek	30 (10, 10, 10)	Paso doble	1950s	"Spanish Guitar" — Bo Diddley	Safe

=== Week 9: Semifinals ===
Each couple performed two unlearned dances. Couples are listed in the order they performed.

Couple	Scores	Dance	Music	Result
Erin & Maks	27 (9, 9, 9)	Viennese waltz	"February Song" — Josh Groban	Safe
Erin & Maks	29 (10, 9, 10)	Paso doble	"U Got the Look" — Prince	Safe
Nicole & Derek	30 (10, 10, 10)	Argentine tango	"El Capitalismo Foráneo" — Gotan Project	Safe
Nicole & Derek	29 (10, 9, 10)	Cha-cha-cha	"Kiss" — Prince	Safe
Chad & Cheryl	27 (9, 9, 9)	Waltz	"If You Don't Know Me by Now" — Simply Red	Eliminated
Chad & Cheryl	25 (8, 8, 9)	Samba	"Alejandro" — Lady Gaga	Eliminated
Evan & Anna	29 (10, 9, 10)	Foxtrot	"I've Got the World on a String" — Frank Sinatra	Safe
Evan & Anna	30 (10, 10, 10)	Paso doble	"Bring Me to Life" — Evanescence	Safe

=== Week 10: Finals ===
On the first night, the three couples performed two dances: a redemption dance selected by one of the judges, which was a style they had already performed earlier in the competition and their freestyle routine. On the second night, the final three couples performed their favorite dance, which for all three was the Argentine tango. After the third place couple was eliminated, the two remaining couples performed one final dance. Couples are listed in the order they performed.

Night 1

Couple	Judge	Scores	Dance	Music
Erin & Maks	Bruno Tonioli	29 (10, 10, 9)	Samba	"Mi swing es tropical" — Quantic & Nikodemus
Erin & Maks	Bruno Tonioli	26 (9, 8, 9)	Freestyle	"Alone" — Heart
Evan & Anna	Len Goodman	28 (10, 9, 9)	Viennese waltz	"Piano Man" — Billy Joel
Evan & Anna	Len Goodman	24 (8, 8, 8)	Freestyle	"Footloose" — Kenny Loggins
Nicole & Derek	Carrie Ann Inaba	28 (9, 9, 10)	Rumba	"The Lady in Red" — Chris De Burgh
Nicole & Derek	Carrie Ann Inaba	27 (9, 9, 9)	Freestyle	"A Little Less Conversation" — Elvis Presley

Night 2

Couple	Scores	Dance	Music	Result
Erin & Maks	26	Argentine tango	"Una Música Brutal" — Gotan Project	Eliminated (Third place)
Nicole & Derek	30	Argentine tango	"El Capitalismo Foráneo" — Gotan Project	Winners
Nicole & Derek	30 (10, 10, 10)	Jive	"Proud Mary" — Ike & Tina Turner	Winners
Evan & Anna	28	Argentine tango	"Bust Your Windows" — Jazmine Sullivan	Runners-up
Evan & Anna	28 (10, 9, 9)	Quickstep	"I Want You to Want Me" — Letters To Cleo	Runners-up

== Dance chart ==
The couples performed the following each week:

- Week 1: One unlearned dance (cha-cha-cha or Viennese waltz)
- Week 2: One unlearned dance (foxtrot or jive)
- Week 3: One unlearned dance (paso doble, quickstep, or waltz)
- Week 4: One unlearned dance (rumba or tango)
- Week 5: One unlearned dance
- Week 6: One dance (Argentine tango or samba) & swing dance marathon
- Week 7: One unlearned dance & team dance
- Week 8: Two unlearned dances
- Week 9 (Semifinals): Two unlearned dances
- Week 10 (Night 1): Judges' choice dance & freestyle
- Week 10 (Night 2): Favorite dance (Argentine tango) & Dance-off

Dancing with the Stars (season 10) - Dance chart
Couple	Week																
Couple	1	2	3	4	5	6		7		8		9		10			
Couple	1	2	3	4	5	6		7		8		9		Night 1		Night 2	
Nicole & Derek	Viennese waltz	Jive	Quickstep	Rumba	Tango	Samba	Swing; Marathon	Waltz	Team; Cha-cha-cha	Foxtrot	Paso doble	Argentine tango	Cha-cha-cha	Rumba	Freestyle	Argentine tango	Jive
Evan & Anna	Viennese waltz	Jive	Quickstep	Tango	Rumba	Samba	Swing; Marathon	Argentine tango	Team; Cha-cha-cha	Waltz	Cha-cha-cha	Foxtrot	Paso doble	Viennese waltz	Freestyle	Argentine tango	Quickstep
Erin & Maks	Cha-cha-cha	Foxtrot	Waltz	Tango	Jive	Samba	Swing; Marathon	Quickstep	Team; Cha-cha-cha	Argentine tango	Rumba	Viennese waltz	Paso doble	Samba	Freestyle	Argentine tango	
Chad & Cheryl	Cha-cha-cha	Foxtrot	Paso doble	Rumba	Quickstep	Argentine tango	Swing; Marathon	Viennese waltz	Team; Cha-cha-cha	Tango	Jive	Waltz	Samba				
Niecy & Louis	Cha-cha-cha	Foxtrot	Waltz	Rumba	Jive	Argentine tango	Swing; Marathon	Quickstep	Team; Cha-cha-cha	Viennese waltz	Paso doble						
Pamela & Damian	Cha-cha-cha	Foxtrot	Paso doble	Rumba	Quickstep	Argentine tango	Swing; Marathon	Waltz	Team; Cha-cha-cha								
Jake & Chelsie	Viennese waltz	Jive	Quickstep	Tango	Cha-cha-cha	Samba	Swing; Marathon										
Kate & Tony	Viennese waltz	Jive	Paso doble	Tango	Foxtrot												
Aiden & Edyta	Cha-cha-cha	Foxtrot	Quickstep	Rumba													
Buzz & Ashly	Cha-cha-cha	Foxtrot	Waltz														
Shannen & Mark	Viennese waltz	Jive															

== Ratings ==
Viewership and ratings per episode of Dancing with the Stars (American TV series) season 10
No.	Title	Air date	Rating/share (18–49)	Viewers (millions)	Ref.
1	"Week 1"	March 22, 2010	6.4/17	24.19	
2	"Week 2"	March 29, 2010	5.6/16	22.97	
3	"Week 2: Results"	March 30, 2010	3.0/9	14.28	
4	"Week 3"	April 5, 2010	5.1/14	21.21	
5	"Week 3: Results"	April 6, 2010	2.5/7	12.44	
6	"Week 4"	April 12, 2010	4.9/14	20.56	
7	"Week 4: Results"	April 13, 2010	2.8/8	13.60	
8	"Week 5"	April 19, 2010	4.8/13	21.07	
9	"Week 5: Results"	April 20, 2010	2.4/7	13.56	
10	"Week 6"	April 26, 2010	4.4/12	20.40	
11	"Week 6: Results"	April 27, 2010	2.4/7	12.39	
12	"Week 7"	May 3, 2010	4.1/12	19.64	
13	"Week 7: Results"	May 4, 2010	2.4/7	12.04	
14	"Week 8"	May 10, 2010	4.1/11	19.16	
15	"Week 8: Results"	May 11, 2010	2.5/7	12.52	
16	"Week 9"	May 17, 2010	4.1/11	19.04	
17	"Week 9: Results"	May 18, 2010	2.5/7	13.19	
18	"Week 10"	May 24, 2010	4.0/12	19.36	
19	"Week 10: Results"	May 25, 2010	3.9/11	18.40	
