= Fawn Silver =

American actress

- Years active: 1965–1972

Fawn Silver is an American actress. She is best known for her role as "Ghoulita", the Black Ghoul, in the 1965 Ed Wood sexploitation film script Orgy of the Dead (directed Stephen C . Apostolif).

Fawn Silver is one of the stars in "The Director of the Dead" Chapter from Jordan Todorov's biography book "Dad Made Dirty Movies" about producer and director Stephen Apostolof, who collaborated with Ed Wood in making "Orgy of the Dead" and other sexploitation films.

== Filmography ==
Year	Title	Role
1972	Legend of Horror	
1968	Terror in the Jungle	Marion
1966	Unkissed Bride	Goldy
1965	Orgy of the Dead	The Black Ghoul
