= Grozdanov =

Grozdanov (Bulgarian: Грозданов) is a surname. The feminine form is Grozdanova (Bulgarian: Грозданова). Notable people with the surname include:

- Branimir Grozdanov (born 1994), Bulgarian volleyball player
- Cvetan Grozdanov (1936–2018), Macedonian art historian
- Dilyana Grozdanova (1957–2025), Bulgarian politician
- Kire Grozdanov (born 1970), Macedonian football player
- Kiril Grozdanov (born 1997), Bulgarian football player
- Plamen Grozdanov (born 1950), Bulgarian diplomat
- Stefan Grozdanov (born 1946), Bulgarian football player and manager
- Tihomir Grozdanov (born 1987), Bulgarian tennis player
