= Beverly Hills, 90210 season 7 =

Beverly Hills, 90210
- Season 7
- DVD cover
- Starring: Jason Priestley Jennie Garth Ian Ziering Brian Austin Green Tori Spelling Tiffani-Amber Thiessen Joe E. Tata Kathleen Robertson
- No. of episodes: 32

Release
- Original network: Fox
- Original release: August 21, 1996 – May 21, 1997

Season chronology
- ← Previous; Season 6 Next → Season 8

The seventh season of Beverly Hills, 90210, an American drama television series aired from on August 21, 1996 on Fox and concluded on May 21, 1997 after 32 episodes. This season follows the gang during their senior year of college as struggle with issues such as hostage situations, relationships, racism, infidelity, HIV/AIDS, natural disasters, alcoholism, depression, drug use, pregnancy, suicide attempts, miscarriages, and sex.

The season aired Wednesday nights at 8/7c in the United States averaging 13.2 million viewers. It was released on DVD in 2009.

== Synopsis ==
Before they swap in their flip-flops for full-time careers, the Beverly Hills 90210 gang take one last loop around campus in their senior year. As Brandon, Kelly, Donna, David, Steve, Val, and Clare battle natural disasters, face their own demons, and learn that old flames never burn out, you may see the action unfold on the screen. From unexpected pregnancy to a terrifying hostage situation, surviving their senior year will be the most difficult test they've ever faced.

== Cast ==
=== Starring ===
- Jason Priestley as Brandon Walsh
- Jennie Garth as Kelly Taylor
- Ian Ziering as Steve Sanders
- Brian Austin Green as David Silver
- Tori Spelling as Donna Martin
- Tiffani Thiessen as Valerie Malone
- Joe E. Tata as Nat Bussichio
- Kathleen Robertson as Clare Arnold

=== Recurring ===
- Ann Gillespie as Jackie Taylor
- Matthew Laurance as Mel Silver
- Jill Novick as Tracy Gaylian
- Katherine Cannon as Felice Martin
- Michael Durrell as John Martin
- Nicholas Pryor as Chancellor Milton Arnold
- Dalton James as Mark Reese
- Joseph Gian as Kenny Bannerman
- Kane Picoy as Tom Miller
- Dan Gauthier as Dick Harrison
- Greg Vaughan as Cliff Yeager
- Julie Nathanson as Ellen Fogerty
- Trevor Edmond as Evan Potter
- Michael Stoyanov as Jimmy Gold
- Corin Nemec as Derrick Driscoll
- Jason Lewis as Rob Andrews
- Natalia Cigliuti as Chloe Davis
- Christine Belford as Samantha Sanders
- Jed Allan as Rush Sanders
- Randy Spelling as Ryan Sanders
- Michelle Phillips as Abby Malone
- Caroline Lagerfelt as Sheila Silver
- John Reilly as Bill Taylor
- Julie Parrish as Joan Diamond Bussichio
- June Lockhart as Celia Martin

=== Notable guest stars ===
- Jamie Walters as Ray Pruit
- James Eckhouse as Jim Walsh

== Episodes ==
No. overall	No. in season	Title	Directed by	Written by	Original release date	Prod. code	U.S. viewers (millions)
177	1	"Remember the Alamo"	James Whitmore, Jr.	Larry Mollin	August 21, 1996	2196172	12.3
Brandon and Steve are on a summer road trip across the country when run into a bit of trouble when their car breaks down in a small racist town in rural Texas, called Hadley. Steve decides to head out via the airlines, and leaves Brandon to fend for himself in a not-so-friendly environment when redneck locals harass him after he befriends a young black woman, named Mariah. Back in Beverly Hills, Donna works with David on a video shoot, and the singer isn't the only one that is hard to deal with. Meanwhile, Valerie meets with Kenny Bannerman, a local businessman and one of Jim Walsh's former coworkers, whom she hires to help revamp business for the Peach Pit After Dark. Also, Clare and Steve attempt to meet with each other after spending their summer away, unaware that they are at the same airport at LAX waiting for the other.
178	2	"Here We Go Again"	Anson Williams	Steve Wasserman	August 28, 1996	2196173	10.5
The Beverly Hills Beach Club holds its annual reunion. Steve reminisces about his relationship with Kelly, as he lost his virginity to her on the beach in 9th grade. Clare is disturbed to learn of the couple's history, and comments on the "incestuous" nature of the group. Steve confesses that he helped spread rumors about Kelly after their break-up, causing her to gain a reputation as a slut. Kelly is hurt, but eventually decides to forgive him. Meanwhile, Steve's annoying half-brothers, Ryan and Austin, return and learn another hard lesson in finding girls. Ryan blows a chance at a date when Austin convinces him to spy on the girl as she undresses. Steve gives the boys a lecture about treating women with respect. David continues to dump all over Donna for quitting the music video business. He harasses her when she talks and dances with another guy, and they decide to break up. Kelly goes to work at an AIDS hospice to complete her summer school credits. Mark Reese, the general manager of the campus television station, recruits Brandon and flirts with Kelly. Also Valerie starts a casual romance with Kenny, who is married but supposedly separated. This episode features a special appearance by The Eliminators.
179	3	"A Mate for Life"	Burt Brinckerhoff	John Whelpley	September 4, 1996	2196174	10.8
Joan's daughter Lily comes to town to serve as maid of honor, and seduces best man Brandon. Nat, Brandon and Steve discover that Lily is an exotic dancer. Nat and Joan's wedding comes to a halt when she goes into labor. She refuses to have the baby until she is a married woman, so they tie the knot in the hospital hallway. Joan gives birth to a son, Frankie. Clare insists that she will never get married, as she couldn't bear to walk down the aisle without her mother. Touched by Joan and Nat's romance, she decides to be more receptive to the idea of marriage. Meanwhile, Kelly befriends Jimmy, a young gay man and hospice resident with an upbeat attitude. David moves into Mark's luxurious home. He tries to get another video contract after being dropped by MZA, and refuses to help Donna film the wedding. Also, Valerie sees Kenny having lunch with his wife and son and rightfully suspects that he has lied about his marital status.
180	4	"Disappearing Act"	David Semel	John Eisendrath	September 11, 1996	2196175	12.0
Kelly helps Jimmy treat a bleeding cut, and panics after getting some of the blood on her hand. The doctor assures her that she cannot contract HIV this way, but she decides to take an AIDS test because of her long history of unprotected sex. The test is negative, and Kelly apologizes for shunning Jimmy. The gang watches Jimmy perform a magic show; later that evening, he tells Kelly that he has just a few days to live. Meanwhile, David refuses to tell his father that he has dropped out of school, so Donna breaks the news to Mel. Mel issues David an ultimatum: he must finish college or lose all financial support. Brandon and Mark hire a confident young woman, named Tracy Gaylian, as their news anchor. She suffers a panic attack just before the first broadcast. Mark and Brandon try to calm her with a drink, and she ends up getting plastered. Also, Kenny declares his love for Valerie and does not want their secret romance to end.
181	5	"Pledging My Love"	James Darren	Phil Savath	September 18, 1996	2196176	11.2
Kelly and David take Jimmy to synagogue to celebrate the Jewish New Year. Jimmy becomes very ill the next day and thanks Kelly for her friendship and then dies. Donna gives a shy basketball player, named Dani, a makeover to help her get into the Alpha house. She is accepted, but decides to pledge a sorority that is not so elitist. Donna resigns as rush chairperson to protest the behavior of Alpha president Ellen. Steve leads a group of KEG pledges in a Spirit Day prank by streaking; they run through Chancellor Arnold's speech wearing nothing but shaving cream, only to have the sprinklers come on. The dean becomes furious when the incident is replayed on the CU News, as she considers it sexual harassment. Chancellor Arnold, with Mark's cooperation, orders Brandon to turn over the tape so that he can identify the offenders. He reluctantly gives the chancellor the tape, which is mysteriously blank. Tracy reveals that she erased the video with a magnet out of loyalty to Steve and Brandon. Elsewhere, Kenny rents a love nest for his liaisons with Valerie, then stands her up for a family outing. Brandon becomes suspicious of the duo's relationship.
182	6	"Housewarming"	Chip Chalmers	Jessica Klein	September 25, 1996	2196177	11.8
David and Mark throw a big party at their Hollywood Hills house. Clare catches Steve kissing another girl and dumps him; she is tired of constantly fighting and listening to Steve's apologies. A fire sweeps through the hills and threatens the house. Kelly experiences flashbacks about being burned (back in Season 5), but decides to stay and help everyone protect the house. The house is spared because of a shift in the winds. David drinks too much and spends the whole day throwing up. Donna slips and injures her knee while trying to save a baby deer. The firefighters (including hunky Cliff Yeager) rescue Donna and the deer. Kelly accepts a date from the persistent Mark. Valerie comes clean with Brandon about her affair with Kenny; he warns her to break things off, but naturally Valerie will not listen to him. Kenny and his wife finally agree to seek a divorce. Kenny tells Valarie that he cannot see her for the time being because he does not want to give ammunition to his wife's attorney. At the end, Valerie storms into Kenny's office and announces that she is pregnant.
183	7	"Fearless"	Harvey Frost	Larry Mollin	October 30, 1996	2196178	11.7
On Halloween, Kenny orders Valerie to terminate her pregnancy. He agrees to pay her $100,000 to have an abortion. When he skips a meeting where he was to make the payment, she delivers diapers to his befuddled wife. Kenny angrily writes Valerie the check. Firefighter Cliff helps out with the Alphas' haunted house, where he encourages a young boy to overcome his fears. Cliff later has a date with Donna at the After Dark. Steve is miffed when Clare chooses to go to the Halloween concert with egotistical Dick Harrison, a Phi Beta Kappa member. He uses an escort service in the hopes of making Clare jealous, but she learns that Steve paid the woman and mistakenly assumes that she is a hooker. Steve turns down Clare's proposal of an open relationship. Meanwhile, Brandon and Tracy spend time together at the club, although he does not wish to pursue another workplace romance. He gives her a ride home and kisses her. Also, David refuses to spend the weekend at his grandparents' house in Palm Springs. At the end, David's father, Mel, calls him to deliver the bad news that his grandfather died of a heart attack. This episode features a special appearance by Tony Rich.
184	8	"The Things We Do for Love"	Gilbert M. Shilton	Laurie McCarthy	November 6, 1996	2196179	11.8
Steve overhears Valarie discussing her pregnancy on the phone. She begs him to keep her secret, but he shares the news with Kelly. Kelly gives Valerie her full support and offers to drive her to the clinic. Val turns her down, claiming that Kenny will be by her side. Kelly runs into Kenny at a restaurant, and Valerie's conflicting story prompt Kelly and Steve to suspect that she was never pregnant. David's grandfather leaves him $250,000 and a 1961 Thunderbird. Mel believes that David should keep the money in a trust fund, and threatens to contest the will. Mel later backs off, although he and David's mother, Sheila, express concern about David's increased drinking. Steve learns that Clare and Dick are participating in a rowboat crew. He begins rowing with a group of his frat brothers, and responds to Dick's taunts by challenging his squad to a race. Donna and Cliff become closer. During a day of hiking, he reveals that he is leaving for an out-of-state job. An uncomfortable Tracy decides to quit her TV job after Brandon nixes a relationship. She changes her mind because she is having a good time at the station.
185	9	"Loser Takes All"	Christopher Hibler	John Eisendrath	November 13, 1996	2196180	12.8
Kelly takes great delight in telling Brandon about Valerie's pregnancy and abortion, and also shares her doubts about Val's story. Brandon goes to see Kenny, who portrays himself as an innocent victim caught in the web of an evil vixen. He tells Brandon that he paid Valerie $100,000 to stay away. Brandon threatens to throw Valarie out of his house unless she gives the money back. Valerie plans to move out, but returns the money following a talk with Tracy. She confesses to Brandon that she was never pregnant, and insists that she cannot live up to his moral expectations. Mel, worried by David's newfound wealth, asks Donna to keep an eye on him. David goes on a wild spending spree, and later shows up at Donna's apartment in the middle of the night after swimming in the ocean. David offers to help out the financially strapped Valerie by purchasing half of the club. They celebrate their deal by making out. Also, Steve impresses Clare with his dedication as he trains for the crew race. His team barely loses, but Clare decides that she wants him back. Kelly comes clean with Mark about her past drug problem.
186	10	"Lost in Las Vegas"	Michael Lange	Steve Wasserman	November 20, 1996	2196181	12.2
David takes Valerie, Steve and Clare to Las Vegas for the weekend. He frightens them with his reckless driving. They see Ray perform in concert, and he comments on David's frenzied behavior. David gets drunk and suffers heavy gambling losses. He invites two young women on the street to join him at another casino. The women take David to their motel, where they drug him and steal his money, credit cards, jewelry and clothes. Ray calls Donna and advises her to fly in from Los Angeles. She yells at her friends for not babysitting David, then comforts him. Meanwhile, Brandon meets a troubled woman, named Melanie, at the Peach Pit; she was robbed just after arriving in town, and cannot get in touch with her fiance. Brandon provides her with refuge, and helps her pick up the pieces when she learns that her fiance has met someone else. Also, Steve steals a term paper from Brandon and turns it in as an independent study project. Mark agrees to be patient with Kelly, who is not ready for an intimate relationship. Jamie Walters returns as Ray Pruit.
187	11	"If I Had a Hammer"	Jason Priestley	John Whelpley	November 27, 1996	2196182	8.6
During an argument with Donna in the student union, David throws a tantrum and cuts his hand on a glass. He must see a psychiatrist after displaying hostile behavior toward the ER staff. Mel agrees with the doctor's recommendation that David be held 72 hours for observation. David is diagnosed with a mild form of manic depression. His mother, Sheila, comes to see him and advises him to moderate his behavior; he will not require medication if he seeks therapy and stops drinking. David thanks Donna for her support, and they decide to get back together. Meanwhile, Steve faces plagiarism charges. Professor Randall, who assumed control of the independent study course after returning to C.U., recognized Brandon's writing. Randall still holds a vendetta against Brandon over his past tryst with his wife Lucinda (back in Season 4), and brings collusion charges against him. Kelly's and Mark's plans for a romantic weekend getaway are foiled by a lost reservation. They finally secure a motel room, only to come down with food poisoning. The gang helps Willie build a house, which his family will receive from Habitat for Humanity. Valarie displays construction skills as a result of working with her contractor father, but hints to Clare that she has few happy memories of her dad. At the end, everyone eats Thanksgiving dinner inside the unfinished house.
188	12	"Judgement Day"	David Semel	Phil Savath	December 11, 1996	2196183	11.0
Steve elects to plead guilty, leaving his punishment to the lenient Chancellor Arnold. Brandon refuses to plead guilty to a crime he did not commit, and faces a hearing and possible expulsion. Randall tries to prove that Brandon knew the contents of Steve's paper by pointing out that he handed it to Muntz for delivery. He also claims that Brandon let Steve cheat off his quizzes in freshman sociology. Steve digs through the fraternity files and proves that he flunked every sociology quiz. Brandon is cleared, and Professor Randall faces charges for forging his grade ledger and lying at the hearing. Meanwhile, Kelly throws a surprise birthday party for Mark, although he would rather be left alone. He hates the party even more when everyone ignores him and flocks to Brandon. Also, Felice objects to Donna's renewed relationship with David, which she considers unhealthy. Dr. Martin advises Donna to follow her heart. Donna tries to stop David from buying into the Peach Pit After Dark.
189	13	"Gift Wrapped"	Kevin Inch	Christine McCarthy	December 18, 1996	2196184	12.9
David seeks his father's help in winning over Felice. Mel and Jackie invite David, Donna and her parents over for dinner. Felice naturally makes catty and snide remarks about the pre-prom incident from three years earlier (back in Season 3), the fact that Jackie and Mel are not married, and David's mental problems. A furious Donna refuses to come to her parents' house for Christmas. Felice apologizes to David and asks him to arrange a truce. Kelly's father fails to show for dinner, but a young woman arrives in his place. She stuns Kelly by revealing that she is her half-sister, Joy Taylor. Kelly is angry to learn that her mother hid the truth, and she and Joy become friends as they compare notes about their absentee father. Meanwhile, Chancellor Arnold immediately hits it off with Samantha at his Christmas party, making both Steve and Clare uncomfortable. The gang picks names from a hat to decide who will exchange gifts. Brandon and Tracy struggle with their gift selections, as neither wants to send the wrong message. While shopping for Kelly's present, Valerie gets some help from a kindly woman collecting donations at the mall. Val and Kelly wind up exchanging identical journals. This episode features a special appearance by C. L. Franklin and The Blind Boys of Alabama.
190	14	"Jobbed"	Jason Priestley	Larry Mollin	January 8, 1997	2196185	10.72
Brandon and Mark vie for the prestigious Dryer scholarship. Mark appeases Kelly by providing Brandon with tips, although he believes that he is a shoo-in because of his wealth and connections. Brandon wins one of the two scholarships, while Mark gets nothing. Mark does not handle the news well. He skips a party for Brandon, then confronts Kelly in the Peach Pit parking lot. He orders her to stay away until she is willing to sleep with him, so she dumps him. Meanwhile, Clare gets Steve an interview at the C.U. job fair, but his interviewer propositions him. Clare suspects that Steve invented the story to hide the fact that he blew the interview. The woman again comes on to Steve, unaware that her boss and Clare are listening nearby. Donna fills in for her father's ailing receptionist. Dr. Martin criticizes Donna for humoring talkative patients, but her listening skills later head off a potential disaster. Tom Miller, Valerie's old boyfriend from Buffalo, comes to town. Valerie offers him a job managing the club, despite David's objections. While watching her prom video, Val becomes unnerved by footage of her late father.
191	15	"Phantom of C.U."	Les Landau	Steve Wasserman	January 15, 1997	2196186	11.88
Donna joins the C.U. News as a weather forecaster, incorporating fashion tips into her reports. She begins receiving anonymous, menacing phone calls. Meanwhile, Clare sets up Kelly on a blind date with a guy who turns out to be a pompous windbag. Donna then tries to convince Kelly to go out with Evan Potter, a nice guy who operates the camera for the C.U. News. Kelly reluctantly agrees to a double date. Evan comforts Donna when her stalker leaves a threatening message on a videotape. While working late-night security detail as part of his probation, Steve has a run-in with the "Phantom of C.U.," a homeless man who lives on campus and plays pranks on security guards. Steve catches the guy in the act and learns that he is C.U. senior Larry Lincoln. Larry lives in the basement of a school building and eats from the garbage because he cannot afford food or housing. Steve doesn't turn him in, and gives him money to get an apartment for the rest of the year. Val tells Tom that she is only interested in a casual relationship. David refuses to believe that Tom can secure pop singer Donna Lewis (an old friend) for a concert. When the event proves to be a success, David thanks Tom by inviting him to stay at Mark's old house. (Mark was so devastated by his failure to receive the Dryer and break-up with Kelly that he left school just a few months before graduation—likely!) This episode features a special appearance by Donna Lewis.
192	16	"Unnecessary Roughness"	Gilbert M. Shilton	John Whelpley	January 22, 1997	2196187	11.41
David and Tom team up to produce a Super Bowl party at the After Dark, much to Valerie's annoyance. Donna believes she has solved the mystery of her stalker's identity when she sees Garrett Slan, the man who tried to rape her (from back in Season 5), at the university. Donna's friends insist that she is mistaken, as Slan is in prison. Donna is cheered by a "girls' night out" with Kelly and Clare, until someone tries to run over her outside the After Dark. While sorting through her parents' unopened mail, Donna finds a notice that Slan has been recently released from prison. Meanwhile, Brandon and Tracy spend the weekend at her family's ranch near Bakersfield. Tracy is distracted by her horse, which has taken ill; and the presence of Sam, an ex-boyfriend who once asked her to marry him. Tracy rejects Sam's advances and has sex with Brandon in the barn. Back in Beverly Hills, Steve and Dick team up to market T-shirts for sale at the After Dark's Super Bowl party. Steve puts his sewing skills to use after he mistakenly orders shirts adorned with a picture of a soccer ball.
193	17	"Face-Off"	Chip Chalmers	Laurie McCarthy	January 29, 1997	2196188	12.28
Donna's request for a permanent restraining order against Slan is denied. He shows up in a classroom and tries to tell her something, but she runs out. David and Tom confront Slan, who claims that he was trying to warn Donna about her stalker. Donna discovers that someone has left a dead rat in her bedroom. Slan finally picks a fight with David at the Peach Pit After Dark so that the restraining order will be granted. He leaves town, but Donna receives more threatening phone calls... revealing that he was telling the truth about not being Donna's stalker. Meanwhile, Kelly sets her sights on Tom. Valerie believes that Kelly is dating Tom just to hurt her. Tracy accidentally tells Brandon that she loves him; a fact that he does not reciprocate. Brandon and Tom participate in a charity hockey game with NHL players. The jealous Brandon takes a cheap shot at Tom after watching Kelly kiss him before the game. Also, Steve and Clare consider living together as they spend a weekend housesitting. Elsewhere, David takes an interest in a young singer, named Chloe Davis.
194	18	"We Interrupt This Program"	Kevin Inch	John Eisendrath	February 5, 1997	2196189	12.61
Rusty, a technician at the TV station, quits in anger after the police question him about Donna. Evan admits his feelings for Donna and confesses that he is the stalker. When she tells Brandon and Tracy, he pulls a gun and holds the entire staff hostage. He holds Donna at gunpoint and forces Brandon and Tracy to put him on the air. He eventually lets the others leave, but Brandon refuses to leave Donna. Donna tricks Evan into putting his gun down by feigning an interest in him. She kisses him, then kicks the gun away as the SWAT team moves in to arrest him. Meanwhile, Valerie threatens to fire Tom unless he stops seeing Kelly. She apologizes, but he quits anyway. Kelly claims that she is not acting out of spite. Elsewhere, Steve and Clare try to keep their parents from dating during an excursion to San Diego, as they are afraid of being left behind. They finally apologize after realizing how selfishly they have acted. David, oblivious to Donna's situation, becomes more closer to Chloe Davis. Joe E. Tata does not appear in this episode.
195	19	"My Funny Valentine"	David Semel	Jessica Klein	February 12, 1997	2196190	12.33
Donna is still shaken up after being held hostage, and Clare and David struggle to bring her out of her funk. She instantly perks up when Cliff makes a surprise visit. She tells him that she has a boyfriend, but David still feels betrayed. Luther Vandross performs at the After Dark for Valentine's Day. David reacts angrily when Donna decides to leave after the concert instead of going out with Luther, Chloe and him. Donna runs into Cliff at the Peach Pit and agrees to a date. Valerie's estranged mother, Abby, comes to town and asks her to approve a second mortgage for the family home, as Val is part-owner. Valerie wants nothing to do with the house and orders her mother to sell it, leaving Abby confused. Valerie is hurt to see Tom with Kelly. Kelly finds her crying in the ladies room. Valerie admits that she needs Tom and pleads for Kelly to set him free if she doesn't really care for him. The guilt-ridden Kelly breaks up with Tom, who later shares a romantic slow dance with Valerie. Elsewhere, Tracy finds the engagement ring that Brandon once offered to Kelly and mistakenly assumes that it is for her. Also, Steve infuriates Clare by smoking pot with Dick. Joe E. Tata does not appear in this episode. This episode features a special appearance by Luther Vandross.
196	20	"With This Ring"	Jason Priestley	Phil Savath	February 19, 1997	2196191	13.54
Tracy is in a snit over the fact that Brandon kept the engagement ring. She breaks up with him. Brandon and Kelly each confess their feelings to friends, but expect the other person to make a move. Tracy confronts Kelly, who admits that she still loves Brandon. Kelly tries to stop Brandon from returning the ring. He cannot bring himself to sell it, and runs into Kelly in the street. She believes that he has already sold it and pretends to support this decision. Brandon exchanges the ring to get a bracelet for Tracy, and Kelly buys the ring and sulks. Meanwhile, Valerie tells her mother that her father repeatedly molested her. Abby refuses to accept this and slaps Val. Abby comes to grips with the truth and apologizes for not protecting Valerie. Val asks Tom to leave town, as his presence is a painful reminder of the abuse. Donna is torn between David and Cliff. Chloe makes a pass at David and annoys him with her rude remarks about Donna. Donna tries to reconcile with David, but storms out when Chloe emerges in just a bra. Elsewhere, Steve and Clare go on a double date with Ryan and his girlfriend. Clare pressures Steve to talk to his brother about sex, but Ryan ultimately decides to remain a virgin for the time being. Jason Priestley has a dual role as a jewellery store owner.
197	21	"Straight Shooter"	Chip Chalmers	Larry Mollin	February 26, 1997	2196192	13.70
Brandon, Steve and Dick play in a 3-on-3 basketball tournament. Dick's pot smoking concerns Brandon. A wasted Dick buys some heroin at the After Dark, and Steve decides to join him. Steve finds Dick collapsed in the bathroom; he dies of an overdose. Steve makes an angry anti-drug speech after someone leaves a bong at a shrine to Dick. Meanwhile, a pretentious magazine editor, named Gigi Crane, profiles Valerie, but the article is ruined when the police take David and Val in for questioning. David pressures Donna to end things with Cliff, while her mother invites Cliff to a family brunch. Donna decides to stay with David, and encourages Cliff to take a job as head of security at Disneyworld. Elsewhere, Kelly and Clare pose as Ukrainian folk dancers to flirt with two young guys during a weekend getaway to Palm Springs.
198	22	"A Ripe Young Age"	Scott Paulin	Steve Wasserman	March 5, 1997	2196193	12.92
Donna and David visit her grandmother in San Luis Obispo. Noting a striking resemblance between David and her late husband, Mrs. Martin tells the couple about her romance with Donna's grandfather, whom she knew for just a few months before he was killed in World War II. Donna and David are touched as they look through Capt. and Mrs. Martin's old pictures and letters. They decide to have faith in their relationship in spite of obstacles such as Felice's opposition. Meanwhile, Kelly finds a young 11-year-old boy sleeping on her front porch who introduces himself as Joey. She reluctantly breaks a promise to the runaway by turning him in to social services, and is wracked with guilt when she learns that Joey ran away from the shelter. Also, Valerie begins a romance with a hot new movie star, named Rob Andrews, who looks to her for support because he is uncomfortable with the industry. Elsewhere, Steve enlists the help of Clare, Brandon and Tracy to film an infomercial for his marketing class, and they all end up in a "sticky situation" with the product.
199	23	"Storm Warnings"	Bethany Rooney	John Whelpley	March 19, 1997	2196194	11.94
Joey returns to the beach apartment. He tells Kelly that he ran away because he believes that his mother no longer needs him, as she has remarried and is expecting a child. Brandon, Tracy, Clare, Kelly and Joey help Steve lay sandbags in front of his father's Malibu home in anticipation of a possible storm. Kelly contacts Joey's mother, and Joey has a happy reunion with his mother and stepfather. Meanwhile, David visits Dr. Martin's office and asks his help in dealing with Felice. Dr. Martin collapses with a stroke, and Donna initially blames David. Rob irritates his manager by seeking Val's advice about whether to sign on for a new movie. Rob's manager pays Valerie $10,000 to convince Rob to do the film. Jim and Cindy invite Brandon to spend spring vacation with them in Hong Kong. Brandon hesitates to give his second ticket to Tracy, but she whines until he invites her along. Clare plays a practical joke on Steve to teach him a lesson about his insensitive behavior.
200	24	"Spring Breakdown"	Charlie Correll	Story by : Greg Plageman; Teleplay by : John Eisendrath	April 2, 1997	2196195	11.54
Brandon and Tracy visit Jim in Hong Kong; Cindy is in London helping Brenda cope with mononucleosis. Jim realizes that Brandon still has feelings for Kelly, but Brandon claims that he is not stringing Tracy along. Back in California, Clare and Steve encourage Kelly to go out instead of moping around the apartment. She gets drunk, flirts with a stranger, and freaks out when she momentarily loses her ring. Steve convinces Kelly to put the ring away. Meanwhile, Felice and Donna argue about the proper approach to Dr. Martin's treatment; Felice wants to put him in a rehab center, while Donna insists that he would be better off at home. Valerie breaks her deal with Alan after he has Rob escort a new actress to a party at the After Dark. Rob is angry with Val for accepting money from Alan, but later asks her to become his manager. This episode features a special appearance by Barenaked Ladies.
201	25	"Heaven Sent"	Anson Williams	Story by : Larry Mollin & Phil Savath; Teleplay by : John Whelpley	April 9, 1997	2196196	11.55
Mariah Murphy (the young black woman whom Brandon met and encouraged to follow her dreams in the season premiere), has just gotten her book published, and she comes to town to give a lecture at the university's new age festival. She develops an instant connection with Kelly, prompting Tracy to bristle. Tracy criticizes Mariah's theories in a news segment, leading to an argument with Brandon. Tracy refuses to attend a harp concert with Brandon. He sits with Kelly, and they share a kiss afterwards. Clare ruins her computer (and loses a term paper) by knocking coffee onto the hard drive while talking on the phone with Steve. She blames Steve, who shuns her after helping her retrieve the file. Clare sends flowers to Steve during the concert and apologizes. Although Rob receives rave reviews for his performance, the press trashes his movie. He is hurt to learn that it won't receive a nationwide release, and decides to quit acting and move back to Indiana. Also, David tries to plan a special evening for Donna, but his frenzied behavior causes her to fear that he is experiencing more mental problems.
202	26	"The Long Goodbye"	Les Sheldon	Ken Stringer	April 16, 1997	2196197	11.63
Brandon breaks up with Tracy, and he and Kelly decide to go out. Valerie vows to help Tracy win back Brandon. She sends Kelly a phony telegram from Dylan asking her to meet him at the airport. Brandon follows Kelly to the airport and fears that she is still in love with Dylan. Kelly explains that she only cares about Dylan as a friend, and that she wanted to tell him that she loves Brandon. Kelly and Brandon get back together. Steve and Donna perform a comedy skit in a talent show. Donna convinces her mother, who has been running herself ragged caring for Dr. Martin, to get out of the house and come to the show. Donna fears the worst when she sees Felice with the man with whom she once had an affair. Felice explains that the man is a doctor; she was trying to arrange a lecture opportunity for Dr. Martin, as he can no longer perform surgeries. Steve encourages Clare to perform in the talent show, but comes to regret it after hearing her sing. She uses her mother's inspiration to deliver a great performance.
203	27	"I Only Have Eyes for You"	Christopher Hibler	Laurie McCarthy	April 23, 1997	2196198	11.33
Clare and Donna feel slighted as Kelly spends all her time with Brandon. Val takes her place at the girls' gymnastics viewing party. She spends the night in Kelly's room because they are all too drunk to drive, and reads her diary. Valerie creates a rift between the roommates by telling Donna and Clare that Kelly said bad things about them. Brandon tries to secure a magic wand from a puppet show host that Kelly liked as a child; she had asked her father to send a letter to the man when she was a little girl, but doesn't think he followed through. teve and Brandon get arrested for auto theft when a disgruntled auto show employee lets them take an electric car for a spin. Brandon gets Kelly the wand, and the host also finds her father's letter. Everyone snubs Valerie, so she decides to create friction between Kelly and her dad by investing money with his firm.
204	28	"All That Jazz"	Kevin Inch	Story by : Larry Mollin & Phil Savath; Teleplay by : Phil Savath	April 30, 1997	2196199	10.84
Brandon has to take care of Kelly and Valerie, who are both laid up with the flu. The girls discuss the reasons for their personal feud, which supposedly dates back to a time when Kelly interrupted a make-out session between Valerie and Brandon (from the end of Season 5). Val blames Kelly for costing her the love of her life, while Kelly insists that she gave Brandon her blessing to date Valerie. Valerie is contacted by Derek Driscoll, a representative from Mr. Taylor's firm. Val tells Brandon that Kelly is hiding the fact that she was accepted to Columbia's graduate school. Kelly declares that she is not leaving town, and decides that Brandon should throw Val out of the house. David convinces Donna to join him at his business meeting in New Orleans, even though she has a class presentation the next day. David thinks that he will score, but gets no further than usual. They oversleep, causing Donna to miss her presentation. Samantha ignores Chancellor Arnold during an evening honoring her sitcom, and eventually dumps him. Steve disagrees with his mom's behavior, but Clare still blames him for everything.
205	29	"Mother's Day"	Chip Chalmers	Jessica Klein	May 7, 1997	2196200	13.04
Kelly learns that she is pregnant, and has difficulty breaking the news to her mother. Brandon is thrilled, but Kelly isn't sure that she wants the baby. Driscoll suggests that Valerie sell her shares in the club so that she has more money available for investment. Val makes a pass at David, prompting Donna to order him to end their working relationship. Valerie eagerly accepts David's buy-out offer. Clare is saddened by Mother's Day, so Steve tries to take her mind off things by going for a drive. Clare believes that her father cannot handle discussion of her mother, but Steve discovers that he was trying to spare Clare's feelings. He brings them together to reminisce. This episode features a special appearance by Monica.
206	30	"Senior Week"	Jefferson Kibbee	John Eisendrath	May 14, 1997	2196201	11.65
Kelly suffers a miscarriage, and learns that she may not be able to have children. Donna worries about her finals; David adds to her stress by pressuring her to let him move in. Donna panics during a final and runs out of the classroom, costing her a chance to graduate. Professor Langely gives her a second chance by offering an oral final exam. Donna passes easily, and Professor Langely tells her that she has a future in the fashion industry. Rush refuses to give Steve a post-graduation job at one of his companies. Chancellor Arnold accepts a teaching job in France, and Steve fears that Clare will go with him. She decides to stay in Los Angeles and seek a future with Steve. Valerie angers Kelly by meeting with her father. Bill delivers the shocking news that Driscoll is no longer his employee; he has stolen all of Val's money. This episode features a special appearance by The Eliminators.
207	31	"Graduation Day"	Jason Priestley	Larry Mollin & Phil Savath	May 21, 1997	2196202A	13.58
208	32	"Graduation Day"	Jason Priestley	Larry Mollin & Phil Savath	May 21, 1997	2196202B	13.58
Kelly again pressures Brandon to evict Val, as she and Brandon plan to live together. Brandon stops Valerie from killing herself and agrees to let her stay at the house. Valerie becomes depressed when her mom, Jim and Cindy all fail to come to town for graduation. She tries to make amends with Kelly after overhearing her push Brandon to evict her. Val pleads with Steve to lobby Brandon on her behalf, but he still kicks her out. Valerie checks into a motel across the street from the bluff where she once contemplated suicide. Brandon finds a suicide note and learns Val's probable location from David. Donna ponders taking her relationship with David to the next level. David helps Steve and Muntz with a senior prank. Kelly is furious when her father insists on attending her graduation. The gang receives invitations to a special grad party with a "roaring '20s" theme. Kelly's sister Joy confesses that Bill is responsible for the event. They arrive at the graduation ceremony in time for Brandon to receive an award. Kelly naturally believes that Val was faking her suicide attempt, and gives Brandon a hard time for going after her. Clare decides to move to Paris with her father, as she cannot imagine living a continent away from her only living family member. She asks Steve to come with her, but he turns her down. At the grad party, Brandon continually hassles Kelly to give her father another chance. She finally offers her forgiveness, only to learn that he is going to jail for embezzlement. Kelly decides to make a fresh start with Val. Steve and Valerie have a drunken fling during the party. Ryan develops a crush on Joy. Donna loses her virginity to David. This episode features a special appearance by The Cardigans, and is the final appearance of Kathleen Robertson as Clare. Much of her final scene is cut in syndication.
