= Jordan Todorov =

Bulgarian film director

- Born: May 29, 1980 (age 46)
- Education: NATFA
- Occupations: Film director, Screenwriter, Journalist
- Years active: 1998–present
- Website: http://www.jordantodorov.com

Jordan Todorov (Bulgarian: Йордан Тодоров; born May 29, 1980) is a Bulgarian documentary filmmaker, screenwriter, producer, and journalist. He graduated with an MA in Film Studies from the Krastyo Sarafov National Academy for Theatre and Film Arts in Sofia, Bulgaria in 2003.

== Career ==
=== Filmmaking ===
Todorov made his writing and directing debut with Concrete Pharaohs (2010), a picturesque documentary about the Kalderash Roma – a closed community of no more than 1 million people all over the world. The film was produced by the Bulgarian company AGITPROP and became the first Bulgarian documentary commissioned by HBO. The film was shortlisted for the Japan Prize 2011 - the International Contest for Educational Media. Todorov served as a researcher for The Boy Who Was a King - a documentary that tells the story of Simeon Saxe-Coburg-Gotha, who at the age of six became the Tsar of Bulgaria. In 2011 Todorov has been commissioned by the Bulgarian National Television to direct the Twilight segment of the Bulgarian version of BBC's Big Read survey.

In 2011 Todorov wrote and directed the documentary Dad Made Dirty Movies (2011), that tells the story of the late American sexploitation producer and director Stephen C. Apostolof. The idea of the documentary dawned on Todorov in 2005, when he received an odd email from a friend: "Look who filmed the erotic scripts by Ed Wood!". The film is produced by AGITPROP in association with Filmtank (Hamburg), ZDF and Arte. Principal photography began in New York City in December 2009, and continued in California, Nevada and Arizona in May 2010. Dad Made Dirty Movies features interviews with Apostolof's children and his third wife Shelley, stars from his films, cult filmmakers, film critics and film historians. Dad Made Dirty Movies premiered at Visions du Réel International Film Festival and played at more than thirty festivals around the world, including Sydney Underground Film Festival, Transilvania International Film Festival, Trieste Film Festival and Mumbai International Film Festival, among others. The film has been sold in more than thirty territories worldwide. Dad Made Dirty Movies will air on HBO in the autumn of 2012. In 2013 Todorov helped produce the short documentary film Plamen, which features the story of Plamen Goranov, who became a symbol of the Bulgarian social protest movement and a catalyst for nationwide protests and government resignations when on 20 February 2013 he set himself on fire in front of the Varna municipal building. In 2014 Todorov was awarded the MEDIA funded Nipkow Programm fellowship to develop his next documentary film in Berlin - a portrait of the iconic photographer Will McBride.

=== Journalism ===
Todorov began his career as a journalist in 2002, working for the weekly newspaper 168 Hours, where he spent several years writing feature stories, interviews and news. Through the years he has earned a reputation for writing about offbeat subjects and characters in a humorous and somewhat surreal way. As a freelance journalist Todorov has written on a wide range of subjects for a number of publications as diverse as Playboy, Esquire, Fotogeschichte,L'Europeo, Vice, Capital, Amica, Expresso, Brava Casa and Abitare. He worked as staff editor for the Bulgarian edition of Rolling Stone until the magazine's closure in September 2011. Todorov has interviewed an array of prominent international figures. His feature interview subjects have included Dita Von Teese, Forrest J Ackerman, Scott Alexander and Larry Karaszewski, Kevin Warwick, Amos Oz, Isabel Allende, Aubrey De Grey, Alison Goldfrapp, Richard Kern, George Lois, Mark Benecke, Alain de Botton, Bunny Yeager, and Georgina Spelvin among others. He authored a biography of Stephen C. Apostolof due to be published in mid-2012 as a tie-in to his most recent documentary Dad Made Dirty Movies. Todorov was a managing editor of the Bulgarian edition of Max. He writes for Atlas Obscura - an online compendium of "The World's Wonders, Curiosities, and Esoterica”.

=== Legal cases ===
==== Yordan Todorov et al. v. Petar Volgin ====
In April 2024, Todorov, along with 47 other plaintiffs, primarily descendants of those sentenced by Bulgaria’s post‑World War II People’s Court, filed a collective civil lawsuit against Bulgarian journalist and politician Petar Volgin, a member of the European Parliament representing the citizen quota of the Bulgarian ultranationalist, far-right party Revival. The plaintiffs alleged that Volgin’s public statements glorified and justified the actions of the People’s Court, which was responsible for politically motivated trials, imprisonment and execution of thousands of Bulgarians during the immediate post-war period, and caused moral and psychological harm to the descendants of the victims. They demanded recognition from the court that such statements were offensive, cessation of similar public statements, and financial compensation of 100,000 Bulgarian lev.

On 27 August 2025, the Sofia City Court dismissed the case and ruled that Volgin's statements were expressions of personal opinion on historical and political issues and as such were protected by the freedom of expression provisions of the Bulgarian Constitution. The ruling underlined the challenge of legally restricting historical commentary whilst preserving constitutional rights. Todorov and co-claimants publicly underscored that although the case was dismissed, it had contributed to larger discussions on historical justice, remembrance of the People's Court, and legal protection for the victims' families. The case is currently under appeal.

==== Yordan Todorov v. the Minister of Interior ====
In October 2006, Todorov, a journalist working for the Bulgarian newspaper 168 Hours at the time, sent a written request under the Bulgarian Access to Public Information Law to the Ministry of Interior to obtain access to documents in the possession of the Ministry’s housing department, namely those on the distribution and subsequent sale of government housing. The purpose was journalistic investigation and reporting.

In November 2006, the Ministry of Interior denied access, citing reasons that Todorov challenged as inconsistent with the legal framework for transparency. Assisted by the Bulgarian Access to Information Programme, Todorov filed a lawsuit before the Supreme Administrative Court to order the Ministry to disclose the requested documents.

On 11 July 2007, a three-member panel of the Supreme Administrative Court’s Fifth Division ruled in Todorov’s favor, repealing the Ministry’s refusal and remanding the case for proper reconsideration. The Ministry appealed, but on 15 November 2007, a five-member panel of the Supreme Administrative Court’s First Division upheld the lower court’s decision.

Yordan Todorov v. the Minister of Interior is regarded as a landmark case in Bulgaria for the practical enforcement of the Access to Public Information Act. It stressed that the administrative bodies cannot deny public information on speculative concerns and explained authorities' procedural duties to ensure openness along with respect for privacy rights.

=== Other ===
In 2011 he was a member of the FIPRESCI jury at the 15th Sofia International Film Festival. The next year he was a member of the jury at the 10th In the Palace International Short Film Festival. In October 2013, Todorov curated "Bunny's Pin-up Girls" - an exhibition of photos by the American photographer Bunny Yeager in Sofia, Bulgaria. In 2016 he translated into Bulgarian the New York Times bestseller Savage Harvest: A Tale of Cannibals, Colonialism, and Michael Rockefeller’s Tragic Quest for Primitive Art - a non-fiction book about the mysterious disappearance of Michael Rockefeller in New Guinea in 1961. Todorov also translated into Bulgarian River of the Sacred Monkey (1970) – a travelogue detailing the adventures of Dimitar Krustev (1920-2013), a Bulgarian-born artist and adventurer, who in 1968 became the first person to successfully navigate the Usumacinta River on the border of Mexico and Guatemala.

== Filmography ==
- The Queen of Crypto (2024)(Field Producer)
- Plamen (2015)(Producer)
- Dad Made Dirty Movies (2011)(Director/Writer)
- The Boy Who Was a King (2011)(Researcher)
- Concrete Pharaohs (2010)(Director/Writer)

== Bibliography ==
- Пришълците: Фаланги (original title Aliens: Phalanx) (Erove) ISBN 9786192770174
- Как STAR WARS покориха вселената. Миналото, настоящето и бъдещето на франчайза, който спечели милиарди (original title How Star Wars Conquered the Universe: The Past, Present, and Future of a Multibillion Dollar Franchise) (Erove) ISBN 9786197736809
- Крадецът на соколи. Истинска история за приключения, предателство и лова на перфектната птица (original title The Falcon Thief: A True Tale of Adventure, Treachery, and the Hunt for the Perfect Bird) (Erove) ISBN 9786192770051
- Дръзките контрабандисти от Тимбукту и тяхната надпревара да спасят най-ценните ръкописи на света от ръцете на Ал Кайда (original title The Bad-Ass Librarians of Timbuktu: And Their Race to Save the World's Most Precious Manuscripts) (Erove) ISBN 9786197313949
- Dad Made Dirty Movies: The Erotic World of Stephen C. Apostolof (McFarland) ISBN 978-1476668680
- Реката на свещената маймуна (original title River of the Sacred Monkey) (Erove) ISBN 9786197313123
- Дивашка жътва (original title Savage Harvest: A Tale of Cannibals, Colonialism, and Michael Rockefeller’s Tragic Quest for Primitive Art) (Erove) ISBN 9786197313000
- Atlas Obscura Explorer's Journal (Workman Publishing Company) ISBN 978-1-5235-0173-1
- Bulgarian cinema. Encyclopedia (Titra) ISBN 978-954-90486-2-9

== Awards and honors ==
- 2014: Nipkow Fellowship awarded by Nipkow Programm - Berlin
- 2012: Bulgarian Film Academy Award for Best Television Documentary for "Dad Made Dirty Movies"
- 2012: The 16th Sofia International Film Fest Young Jury Award for Best Documentary for "Dad Made Dirty Movies"
- 2011: Bulgarian Film Academy Award for Best Debut Film for "Concrete Pharaohs"
- 2011: Japan Prize shortlist - "Concrete Pharaohs"
- 2011: The 15th International Festival of Documentary Films in Jihlava, Czech Republic, Silver Eye Award Nomination for Best Mid-Length Documentary for "Dad Made Dirty Movies"
- 2010: Golden Rhyton Festival of Non-Feature Film Award for Best Debut Film for "Concrete Pharaohs"
- 2010: The 14th International Festival of Documentary Films in Jihlava, Czech Republic, Silver Eye Award Nomination for Best Mid-Length Documentary for "Concrete Pharaohs"
- 2010: The 14th International Festival of Documentary Films in Jihlava, Czech Republic, Silver Eye Award Nomination for Best Central and Eastern European Documentary for "Concrete Pharaohs"
- 2008: Best journalist story/campaign/publication nomination at the 6th Right to Know Awards, organized by Freedom of Information Advocates

Network
