= A Clock Work Blue =

- Theatrical release poster
- Directed by: Eric Jeffrey Haims
- Produced by: Eric Jeffrey Haims; Shelley Haims
- Starring: Joe E. Tata
- Production company: Xerxes Productions Ltd.
- Release date: 1972
- Running time: 86 minutes
- Country: United States
- Language: English

A Clock Work Blue is a 1972 American sexploitation comedy film directed by Eric Jeffrey Haims. It stars Joe E. Tata as Homer, a clumsy researcher who acquires a watch that allows him to travel through time.

== Cast ==
- Joe E. Tata as Homer
- Tracy Handfuss as Nancy
- Marie Arnold as Betsy Ross
- Susannah Fields as Marie Antoinette
- Shella Bancroft as Madame du Barry
- Mady Maguire as Priscilla
- Rene Bond as Anne Boleyn
- Shannon West as Cleopatra
- Jayne Allison as Helen of Troy
- John Kirkland as Paul
- Ed Kelly as Thomas Cromwell
- Sebastian Brooke as Louis XVI
- Ray Sebastian as Paris
- Donn Greer as Julius Caesar
- George Berkley as Professor
- Bill Bagdad as Painter

== Release and legal issues ==
A Clock Work Blue opened in 1972 at the Cinestage Theatre on Dearborn Street in Chicago, Illinois, six days after the film A Clockwork Orange had completed an 18-week run at the nearby Michael Todd Theatre. This, combined with A Clock Work Blue's title and the fact that some of its advertising had made references to A Clockwork Orange (such as that the former film "makes Orange blush") resulted in legal action from Warner Bros., the distributor of A Clockwork Orange. The case resulted in Warner Bros. winning a consent order which declared that A Clock Work Blue was not to be screened under that title in any other theater in Cook County, Illinois.

== Critical reception ==
Brian Orndorf of Blu-ray.com called the film "bizarre and relentless with its mediocrity", as well as "screamingly racist".

== Home media ==
In April 2014, A Clock Work Blue was restored in 4K and released on DVD and Blu-ray by Vinegar Syndrome as a double feature with the 1971 film The Jekyll and Hyde Portfolio, also directed by Haims.
