= Journey to Freedom =

Journey to Freedom may refer to:

- Journey to Freedom (film), a 1957 American film
- Journey to Freedom (album), a 2014 album by Michelle Williams
