= Beverly Hills, 90210 season 6 =

US television series

Beverly Hills, 90210
- Season 6
- DVD cover
- Starring: Jason Priestley Jennie Garth Ian Ziering Luke Perry Brian Austin Green Tori Spelling Tiffani-Amber Thiessen Joe E. Tata Jamie Walters Kathleen Robertson
- No. of episodes: 32

Release
- Original network: Fox
- Original release: September 13, 1995 – May 22, 1996

Season chronology
- ← Previous; Season 5 Next → Season 7

The sixth season of Beverly Hills, 90210, an American drama television series, aired from September 13, 1995, on Fox and concluded on May 22, 1996, after 32 episodes. This season follows the gang during their junior year of college as they struggle with issues such as dysfunctional families, relationships, hostage situations, sexism, abstinence, organized crime, sexual misconduct, grief, and drug abuse.

The season aired Wednesday nights at 8/9c in the United States averaging 9.8 million viewers a week, 4.9 million viewers fewer than the fifth season. It was released on DVD in 2008.

== Overview ==
Brandon and his friends begin their Junior year that will be full of romances, relationship rifts, breakups, breakdowns and big decisions against the harsh realities of life in LA.

== Cast ==
=== Starring ===
- Jason Priestley as Brandon Walsh
- Jennie Garth as Kelly Taylor
- Ian Ziering as Steve Sanders
- Luke Perry as Dylan McKay (episodes 1–10)
- Brian Austin Green as David Silver (Beverly Hills, 90210)
- Tori Spelling as Donna Martin
- Tiffani Amber-Thiessen as Valerie Malone
- Joe E. Tata as Nat Bussichio
- Jamie Walters as Ray Pruit (episodes 1–13, 30)
- Kathleen Robertson as Clare Arnold

=== Recurring ===
- Ann Gillespie as Jackie Taylor
- Matthew Laurance as Mel Silver
- Jason Wiles as Colin Robbins
- Emma Caulfield as Susan Keats
- Cameron Bancroft as Joe Bradley
- Stanley Kamel as Tony Marchette
- Denise Dowse as Vice Principal Yvonne Teasley
- Rebecca Gayheart as Antonia Marchette
- Paige Moss as Tara Marks
- Mary Crosby as Claudia Van Eyck
- Cliff Weissman as Bruno
- Carl T. Evans as Jonathan Casten
- Elisa Donovan as Ginger LaMonica
- Nick Kiriazis as Prince Carl
- Julie Parrish as Joan Diamond
- Michael Dietz as Greg Meyer
- Nicholas Pryor as Chancellor Milton Arnold
- Katherine Cannon as Felice Martin
- Michael Durrell as Dr. John Martin
- Jed Allan as Rush Sanders
- Randy Spelling as Ryan Sanders
- Christine Belford as Samantha Sanders
- Caroline Lagerfelt as Sheila Silver
- John Reilly as Bill Taylor
- Ryan Thomas Brown as Muntz

=== Notable guest stars ===
- Carol Potter as Cindy Walsh
- Gabrielle Carteris as Andrea Zuckerman-Vasquez
- James Eckhouse as Jim Walsh

== Episodes ==
No. overall	No. in season	Title	Directed by	Written by	Original release date	Prod. code	U.S. viewers (millions)
145	1	"Home Is Where the Tart Is"	Michael Lange	Steve Wasserman & Jessica Klein	September 13, 1995	2195141	16.0
Kelly returns to Beverly Hills from a modeling stint in New York. She brings home an artist boyfriend named Colin, who rents a loft in Los Angeles. Brandon comes home from a summer job at the Boston Herald to discover that Val's obnoxious and equally devious friend Ginger (guest star Elisa Donovan) is staying at the house. Val and Brandon agree that they should not get involved, so Ginger comes on to him. Steve, Brandon and David consider renting a penthouse apartment together. David reveals that he and Clare have broken up. The real estate agent tells Brandon that the buyers plan to tear his house down, so the gang throws a party and trashes the place. She then informs Brandon that the house has fallen out of escrow, meaning that his parents still own it, so the group joins forces to clean up the mess and make the place livable. Donna enjoys her summer with Ray, who has made an effort to make up for his past mistakes. A woman's valuable ring disappears during a party on the Martins' boat, and Felice believes that Ray stole it. Meanwhile, Dylan tells Kelly about his obsession with tracking down his father's killer since it has been over two years since Jack McKay was murdered and no one has yet been arrested or charged with the crime, plus the FBI have been refusing to talk to Dylan about the case. When Dylan and Kelly go to the late Jack McKay's storage locker, they find it broken into and ransacked. Unsure if the FBI or the local Mob broke in to prevent him from finding out any clues to Jack McKay's killing, Dylan is more determined to find any information. Kelly helps him sort through Jack's belongings, but does not approve and wants Dylan to stop and just move on with his life; Dylan refuses. Later, Dylan visits his father's former cellmate at the state prison and finally learns the identity of Jack's murderer: a Mob-connected businessman named Tony Marchette. Joe E. Tata, Jamie Walters and Kathleen Robertson are added to the opening credits.
146	2	"Buffalo Gals"	James Whitmore, Jr.	Michael Lyons & Kimberly Wells	September 13, 1995	2195142	16.0
The house is fixed up, and Steve decides to move in with Brandon. Donna finds Mrs. Korman's ring in Ray's jacket pocket. Everyone believes that he stole it (although he points out that he would have to be an idiot to leave the ring in his pocket for days, then let Donna discover it). The house's petty cash and Steve's gold watch turn up missing, and Steve blames Ray. Steve and Ray nearly get into a fight, and Donna decides to give up on Ray. Valerie exposes Ginger as the actual thief and orders her to leave town. Val pays off Ginger at the airport; they actually staged the entire incident so that Valerie could prove herself to the rest of the gang. Brandon tries to bring Kelly flowers for her 21st birthday, only to find Colin in her bedroom. Colin angers Kelly by refusing to show for her birthday party; he later reveals that he spent the time creating a special painting for her. Donna gets drunk at the party and tries to throw herself at Ray. Elsewhere, Brandon gives Dylan information about businessman Tony Marchette, his father's killer. The next day, Dylan follows Marchette from his fortress-like home to his business office and into an elevator just to see how close he can get to him, and the answer is "close enough to have shot and killed him". But Dylan is aware that even if he had shot and killed Marchette, his bodyguards still would have killed Dylan. Not yet ready to die just yet, Dylan instead decides to further investigate Tony Marchette. This episode features a special appearance by Dave Koz.
147	3	"Must Be a Guy Thing"	Jason Priestley	John Eisendrath	September 20, 1995	2195143	14.9
Dylan heads for the C.U. campus in the hopes of striking up a friendship with Marchette's son "Tony" who is a student. Marchette actually has a beautiful daughter, Toni; she agrees to go out with Dylan. Brandon notices that Toni really likes Dylan, and disapproves of his friend's actions. Brandon expresses an interest in a columnist job with the school paper, the Condor. Editor Susan Keats turns him down and seems to loathe him. Brandon writes a sexist column about women as a counterpoint to Susan's similar column about men. They go to the After Dark to "research" behavior of the opposite sex, and Susan decides to hire him. Steve's advisor finally realizes that he cheated on his math placement test as a freshman. He ruins Steve's cushy schedule by forcing him to enroll in remedial math. Steve cannot find any tutor who will do all of his work for a pittance, and ends up hiring Clare when she promises him he'll do all the work himself and pay her a lot of money for teaching him. Kelly feels uncomfortable when she learns that Colin and Valerie once toured Europe together as part of a teen group. Valerie hires Colin to paint a mural at the club. Val confesses to Colin that she had a crush on him, and he fulfills her longtime dream by kissing her. Valerie lashes out at David for arriving at work late, unaware that he was helping his mother move into her own apartment. She apologizes and offers her support. A friend of the Martins, who is president of a record label, agrees to scout Ray. Ray learns that he cannot land a deal unless he impresses the man's young daughter. This is the first appearance of Emma Caulfield as Susan Keats. Jennie Garth's name is misspelled "Jenny" in the opening credits.
148	4	"Everything's Coming Up Roses"	Victor Lobl	Dinah Kirgo	September 27, 1995	2195144	14.1
Donna, Kelly, Clare and Valerie try out for the Tournament of Roses Court. The other girls only wish to secure invitations to a ball, but Donna elects to proceed with the tryouts. Felice does not approve of this decision, leaving Donna confused and hurt. Colin opts out of the party to work on his mural, but later shows up with Valerie. Kelly throws a hissy and jealous fit before Colin explains that nothing is going on. Brandon and Susan cover the Rose Court tryouts for the newspaper, and attend the party together. When they return to the newsroom, Susan grabs Brandon and kisses him. Steve pretends to be sensitive as he woos a woman in a chat room. Clare asks Steve to escort her to the ball. He cuts the date short to meet with his on-line sweetheart, only to find out that it is Clare! Donna and Ray miss the ball because he has to perform at Jessica's birthday party. Meanwhile, Toni surprises Dylan when they go motorcycle riding. Dylan admits to Brandon that he is falling for her. David grows tired of watching after his lonely mother. He and Val stop by Sheila's apartment and find an ambulance; Sheila has attempted suicide.
149	5	"Lover's Leap"	Bethany Rooney	Ken Stringer	October 4, 1995	2195145	13.0
Valerie is haunted by nightmares about her father's suicide. David learns that his mother requires electro shock therapy to improve her chances of recovery from her chronic depression. He does not want her to undergo this course of action, and falls into a deep funk. Valerie tells him about her father and offers to help him. She takes David to a cliff overlooking the city and tests his will to live. David convinces his mother to undergo treatment, and Valerie overcomes her nightmares. Meanwhile, Toni throws a dinner party for Dylan and his friends while her father is out of town. Toni's bodyguard Bruno catches Dylan snooping around in Marchette's study. He tells Dylan that he knows Dylan is Jack's son but makes it clear he's not going to tell his boss that. Steve and Clare decide to attend the party together, and share a good-night kiss. Brandon convinces Susan to go out with him.
150	6	"Speechless"	David Semel	Meredith Stiehm & Larry Mollin	October 18, 1995	2195146	14.3
Valerie gets herself invited on a road trip with Kelly, Donna and Clare. David thanks Val for helping him through his hard times, and gives her a kiss. During the trip, Donna goads Val into admitting that she slept with Ray. The roommates resolve to stop talking to Valerie. The car breaks down, and the girls spend a silent night at a convent alongside silence-vow nuns, where they all come to terms with their own immoral actions and concede their treatment of Valerie has a level of hypocrisy to it. Donna forgives Valerie, who urges her not to forget about Ray's abusive behavior. Donna dumps Ray. Meanwhile, Steve convinces Brandon to let a director film a movie at the Walsh house, without revealing that it is a porno. Susan is offended by the fiasco, but sleeps with Brandon anyway. Elsewhere, Marchette doesn't show for a dinner engagement with Toni and Dylan. He arrives after Toni leaves the table and warns Dylan to stay away from both him and his daughter (revealing here that goons hired by Marchette broke into the late Jack McKay's storage locker to steal anything that pointed to Marchette's name; who was informed months earlier about Dylan investigating his father's murder by Marchette's associate Tom Rose in Palm Springs back at the end of Season 5). Dylan and Marchette's bodyguard pull guns on each other, but they both back down and Dylan leaves. Marchette then tells Toni that Dylan is using her. She refuses to believe Dylan's claim that her father killed Jack. Also, Kelly meets Colin's art dealer, who seems to have more than business on her mind. This episode was originally scheduled to air October 11, 95, but was pre-empted because Fox did not want to compete with the (later cancelled) interview of O. J. Simpson on Dateline NBC.
151	7	"Violated"	Christopher Hibler	Meredith Stiehm & Larry Mollin	October 25, 1995	2195147	13.4
Valerie accepts her marketing professor's invitation to a seminar. They have a drink afterwards, and the man tries to come on to her. He gives her a 'D' on a midterm essay that he had seemed to like earlier, and Val suspects that he is punishing her. David and Susan encourage Valerie to file a complaint. Val backs down because she fears that the investigation will expose embarrassing information about her personal life. Meanwhile, Susan works on an exposé for the Condor. Several of Professor Haywood's past victims come forward, and he is forced to resign. Meanwhile, Bruno delivers a letter from Dylan to Toni, and the couple eventually reunites. Marchette sees Toni and Dylan on campus together and becomes furious. Toni ignores her father's ultimatum and decides to move in with Dylan. Kelly cuts Colin loose after learning that he acts as Claudia's concubine in exchange for financial backing. Steve and Clare quarrel after booking a motel room; he mistakenly assumes that she is responsible for some handcuffs and other sexy items that were left there and she's offended by his thinking. Donna resists Ray's relentless attempts at a reconciliation.
152	8	"Gypsies, Cramps and Fleas"	Burt Brinckerhoff	Christine McCarthy & Sam Sarkar	November 1, 1995	2195148	14.7
Colin appeases Kelly by ending his affiliation with Claudia and taking a teaching job. A fortune teller sets up shop at the Peach Pit for Halloween. In spite of her questionable credibility, her presence affects many couples. She forces Susan to come clean with Brandon about a past relationship. David buys a love potion to use on Valerie, and the two become closer. Steve and Clare accidentally drink the potion and have a rendezvous in the club's dressing room. Donna spends time at the Halloween party with Joe Bradley, the university's star quarterback. A jealous Ray accosts her, prompting Joe to back off. Ray lurks at Donna's apartment and becomes physical when she refuses to talk to him. Joe returns and comes to Donna's defense; he had reconsidered his decision and wants to date her. Dylan and Toni take in a stray kitten. Toni finds Dylan's gun in the first aid kit and insists that he get rid of it. Toni's father meets her at the Peach Pit in the hopes of ending their rift. He refuses to give Dylan a chance, and Toni gets him to admit that he had Jack killed. Dylan disposes of his gun and vows to let go of his anger. He and Toni plan to move to Hawaii. This is the first appearance of Cameron Bancroft as Joe Bradley, and features a special appearance by The Cramps.
153	9	"Earthquake Weather"	Gilbert M. Shilton	Michael Lyons & Kimberly Wells	November 6, 1995	2195149	13.8
Dylan asks Toni to marry him. Kelly is shaken by the news, and angers Dylan with her selfish reaction. She also bristles at David's new relationship with Valerie. Clare comes on strong to Steve. An earthquake rocks the major Los Angeles area, spooking Colin. Brandon and Susan, in Palm Springs for a newspaper conference, get trapped in an elevator with a pregnant woman. They must deliver her child. Donna advances to the finals of the Rose Court selections. She sees her mother in a photograph of the 1969 contestants, but Felice evades the truth and a fed-up Donna refuses to talk to her anymore, leading her parents to admit that they have to tell her the truth about something. Ray begins seeing a therapist and convinces Donna to come to one of his sessions. The doctor warns Donna to stay away from Ray because he's volatile and dangerous right now. Marchette pretends to give Dylan and Toni his blessing, then takes out a hit on Dylan. This episode aired on a Monday night at 9 PM to get the show back on schedule following the October 11 pre-emption.
154	10	"One Wedding and a Funeral"	James Whitmore, Jr.	Steve Wasserman	November 8, 1995	2195150	19.3
The guys kidnap Dylan for his bachelor party at the Walsh house that is a deliberately dull affair involving playing cards and wine tastings, while the girls throw a much wilder time for bride-to-be Toni involving smoking cigars and male strippers at the beach apartment. The two assassins hired by Anthony Marchette plan to kill Dylan but have to adjust their plans when there are other people around. Ray tries to reconcile with Donna and only succeeds in making her loathe him even more. Bruno walks Toni down the aisle at her and Dylan's beautiful ceremony and they're toasted by all their friends. The newlyweds spend the next day or so together in bed, but the cat Toni rescued last week goes missing as a torrential rain begins and she takes Dylan's car to drive out and find her. Bruno learns of his boss' plot and warns Brandon by phone, who drives to Dylan's house and reveals the danger, so they head out to find Toni. Unfortunately, the hitmen think Dylan is driving the car and fire several gunshots into it, leading to Dylan finding Toni's dead body and screaming in pain and horror. The group cannot believe what has happened, as Dylan refuses to talk to the police and denies a broken Mr. Marchette's request that Dylan kill him by saying "My father is gone. Your daughter is gone. We're even now. The killing is done." Dylan packs up his stuff, plus taking his and Toni's cat, turns over his house key to Brandon to close up the residence and rides away on his motorcycle from L.A. This is the final appearance of Luke Perry as Dylan McKay until season 9.
155	11	"Offensive Interference"	Scott Paulin	Larry Mollin	November 15, 1995	2195151	15.8
Joe is suspended over assault charges that Ray files over Donna, and the football team is angry at both of them until they learn the specifics of why Joe was at her apartment after curfew. Brandon and Kelly work together to pack up the rest of Dylan's belongings. Donna and her parents finally tell each other hard truths: Donna reveals that Ray pushed her down the stairs in Palm Springs, and Felice admits that she lied about the 1969 Rose Court pictures because she had to drop out when she got pregnant. Colin lends his artistic talents to another Steve plan to keep the CU mascot safe during Homecoming Week. Valerie is not happy to see private detective Jonesy again and when she helps with him a sleazy plan, she gets arrested. David comes through to support her and she finally makes love with him.
156	12	"Breast Side Up"	David Semel	Jessica Klein	November 22, 1995	2195152	13.2
Colin and Susan leave for New York to spend Thanksgiving with their families. The gang decides to spend the holiday together, and David invites his mother to join them. She annoys Valerie with her constant advice about food preparation, but saves the day when Val accidentally sleeps in. Clare takes Steve to a faculty mixer, where he proves to be a big hit because of his excellent social skills and ends up fully winning Clare's heart. Donna gives a deposition that does not reflect favorably on Joe. As a birthday surprise, she arranges a visit from his hero, San Francisco 49ers quarterback Steve Young. She also plans to sleep with Joe, but he reveals that he is a virgin and does not believe in pre-marital sex. Kelly hangs out at Brandon's house to watch videos, and spends the night in Steve's vacant room. Valerie jumps to conclusions when she comes home the next morning and sees Brandon and Kelly in an embrace.
157	13	"Courting"	Gilbert M. Shilton	John Eisendrath	November 29, 1995	2195153	14.3
Joe rejects a plea bargain and decides to go to trial. Donna testifies that Ray was physically harming her, and Valerie corroborates this with her eyewitness account of the Palm Springs incident. The Associated Press picks up Brandon's story about the trial for nationwide syndication. Brandon tries to convince Ray to stop hurting Donna and reveal the truth about his fight with Joe. The prosecutor portrays Donna as a liar because she covered for Ray on her medical report. Ray feels guilty; he owns up to the abuse and clears Joe during his testimony. Donna denies the prosecutors' plan to put Ray in jail and tells him that if he stays in therapy and gets well, she won't reconsider her decision. Ray thanks Brandon for setting him straight and decides to leave town to start a music tour. Donna's friend Lisa is selected as Rose Queen. Colin babysits for Erin while Kelly and David are at the trial, as Mel and Jackie have gone away for the weekend. Valerie tells Colin that Kelly spent the night with Brandon. Colin refuses to believe Kelly's denial, but their argument is interrupted when Erin falls into the bathtub. Colin revives her through CPR. Susan becomes angry after Brandon reveals that he felt tempted by Kelly and Kelly tells Valerie off for being a manipulative shrew. This is the final appearance of Jamie Walters as Ray Pruit as a series regular.
158	14	"Fortunate Son"	James Fargo	Story by : Steve Wasserman & Larry Mollin & Jessica Klein; Teleplay by : Lana Freistat Melman & Steve Wasserman & John Eisendrath & John Whelpley	December 13, 1995	2195154	14.5
Donna fills in for Lisa at a convenience store. A young boy is caught stealing a teddy bear for his brother's birthday, but Donna covers for him. Donna and Joe get lost and run out of gas. Isaiah, the boy Donna helped, gets them out of a possibly dangerous confrontation by inviting them to his apartment to call a tow truck. Donna discovers that the eleven-year-old and his younger siblings are left alone while their mom is at work. She expresses concern, but their mother comes home and tells her to butt out. Donna finds places for the kids in a day care center that works with her sorority. Brandon alienates Nat and Susan as he gets carried away during the After Dark's charity casino night. Valerie infuriates Kelly and David by outbidding Kelly for a portrait sitting with Colin. She explains that the portrait is a Christmas gift for David. Steve's father gets him a job at a talent agency. After Steve's unpleasant, incompetent boss is fired, she asks him to use his connections with the agency president to arrange a reinstatement, but he instead lets her know gently that her cause is lost.
159	15	"Angels We Have Heard On High"	Jason Priestley	Story by : Larry Mollin; Teleplay by : Phil Savath	December 20, 1995	2195155	14.9
Cindy surprises Brandon by coming to visit for Christmas. Her relationship with Jim is on the rocks, and she is unsure about returning to Hong Kong. Brandon feels devastated, as he fears that his family is falling apart. A special Christmas present from Jim squashes Cindy's doubts about his love, so she returns home. Colin begins using cocaine. Kelly is livid, as he had promised to give up the habit for good, and she holds a blameless and visibly annoyed Valerie responsible for his using. Steve delivers Christmas presents to his boss's mistress and young niece. He gets fired when they receive the wrong gifts (the little girl gets a neglige), making the man's wife aware of his affair. Although someone else had switched the address labels, Rush blames Steve and lights into him. Steve angrily replies that Rush shouldn't worry about him, as they are not really father and son. When Steve meets Rush to apologize, his father makes a shocking revelation: he is Steve's biological father. He had an affair with a waitress, and decided to buy his baby to raise as his own. Steve is initially angry at first, but later expresses happiness and relief at solving the mystery of his parentage. Joe tries to keep an antsy Donna in suspense about her Christmas/21st birthday present. Carol Potter returns as Cindy Walsh in a guest appearance.
160	16	"Turn Back the Clock"	Graeme Lynch	Larry Mollin	January 3, 1996	2195156	16.1
Clare gets back in town, and is met by the gang, who fill her in on what went down while she was on a trip with her father (where she took some time to have New Year's Eve phone sex with Steve). Brandon is pissed that Susan's ex-boyfriend Jonathan keeps hanging around and things go badly enough that he punches the guy and almost calls it quits with her. Steve is on 'teen patrol' for his father, with his two obnoxious teen half-brothers around; they cause a lot of trouble, but Steve comes to feel some sympathy for them and only punishes them with some housework. Joe's pet bird to Donna's interferes with both Steve and Clare's sex life and David's New Year's plans with Valerie, who's already annoyed because Kelly is wrongly blaming her for Colin's drug issues. Valerie and David get back on good terms, and Valerie shuts Kelly up by handing over Colin's drug stash and saying that it's Kelly's problem to deal with now. This episode features a special appearance by The Corrs.
161	17	"Fade In, Fade Out"	Jason Priestley	Story by : Steve Wasserman & Jessica Klein; Teleplay by : Meredith Stiehm	January 10, 1996	2195157	14.2
Kelly's father swoops into town, and once again sweeps her off of her feet with promises of a relationship. Although her friends are worried about the bad track record of Mr. Taylor, she once again believes he's back in her life for good and for good reasons. Unfortunately, he abandons his plans to move back into town, and Kelly makes a terrible personal choice. Joe begins having heart problems and Donna is worried that his doctors are more concerned with getting him back on the football field than properly treating him. When Steve sets up a Roger Corman film festival at the PPAD, they meet a woman named Joan who was the love of Nat's life, and Nat and Joan then reconnect.
162	18	"Snowbound"	Chip Chalmers	John Whelpley	January 17, 1996	2195158	15.6
Kelly's downward spiral leads her into a drug-fueled binge of lavish spending with eager enabler Colin. Valerie tries to tell the group what's going on, but they can't believe Kelly would do that. Brandon and Susan are at odds when she wants to report on Joe's heart condition, and he wants to protect Joe from the effect of the information. Clare gets a new car from her father, races Steve, they end up in a traffic school, after which they get recruited for a TV show about squabbling couples.
163	19	"Nancy's Choice"	James Whitmore Jr.	John Eisendrath	January 31, 1996	2195159	13.6
Susan is nominated for a college journalism award for her story about a girl's decision to have an abortion. Brandon does not understand why Jonathan insists on flying in for the awards ceremony. Susan explains that she and Jonathan broke up over a difference of opinion regarding the story; this further confuses Brandon. Susan wins the award and bursts into tears during her speech. She confesses to Brandon that the story was about herself; devastated by her sister's death, she had a drunken encounter with Jonathan and wound up pregnant. Jonathan proposed to her and was crushed when she chose to terminate the pregnancy. Jonathan offers Susan his forgiveness, although she still has doubts about her decision. Meanwhile, Valerie arranges a meeting between Colin and a knowledgeable art buyer in the hopes of encouraging Colin to get clean and focus on his career. Unfortunately, the man purchases two works that Colin had painted while high and convinces Colin that the drug is his friend. Kelly swears off cocaine but cannot resist temptation for long. Also, Steve runs into Elle (guest star Monika Schnarre), the trans woman who he met in Palm Springs (in Season 5), during a shopping excursion with Clare. Clare refuses to believe that Elle is trans. Elle attends the journalism conference and ends up on a date with Clare's father. Steve pleads with Elle to hide the truth from the chancellor, as he hasn't dated for a while and is very fragile, and Clare overhears to her delight Steve saying to Elle that he's in "love with the chancellor's daughter."
164	20	"Flying"	Chip Chalmers	Story by : Larry Mollin; Teleplay by : Phil Savath	February 7, 1996	2195160	14.4
Valerie's unpleasant friend Ginger returns to town. She forces Val to put her up at a hotel and pay for room service and new dresses. Ginger blackmails Valerie, threatening to tell everyone about the previous fall's scam unless Val coughs up $50,000. She later changes her mind and demands a night with David instead. Clare and Donna confront Kelly after finding drugs in the apartment. She seeks refuge with Colin, and doesn't show for the girls' rummage sale. Brandon takes Kelly for a ride and refuses to drive her home until she has come to her senses. She steals his car when he pulls over to call Susan, then returns to the apartment and tells Donna that she is moving out. Brandon, Steve and Joe accept Jonathan's invitation to go flying in biplanes. Joe faints after his flight, prompting more concern about his heart. He agrees to another appointment with Dr. Martin.
165	21	"Bleeding Hearts"	Jason Priestley	Story by : Larry Mollin; Teleplay by : Lana Freistat Melman	February 14, 1996	2195161	14.3
Kelly and Colin argue because she used their entire coke stash. She goes to see his dealer alone, and a second man kidnaps her. She escapes by hitting him in the head with a wine bottle and drives away. Kelly calls Brandon for help; he finds her trembling in her car. Brandon and Jackie get Kelly into a rehab center. She confesses her love for Brandon, who does not reply. David writes Val a special poem for Valentine's Day. Valerie tries to pacifiy Ginger (and help out Susan) by setting her up with Jonathan. They pretend to be a couple in the hopes of making Susan jealous. When Jonathan tries to trick Susan into entering a dance contest with him, she punches him in the face. Valerie tells David about her scam with Ginger, and asks him to save her from humiliation by spending the night with Ginger. Nothing happens between David and Ginger, but he dumps Valerie because he feels betrayed by her request. The football coach kicks Joe off the team and recruits a new quarterback. Donna stops Joe from quitting school and reminds him that his condition has yet to be evaluated. Donna's sorority asks students to go without sex for 24 hours in order to promote abstinence as a means of preventing venereal diseases. Clare bets that Steve cannot make good on his pledge, and does her best to torture him.
166	22	"All This and Mary Too"	James Fargo	Sam Sarkar	February 21, 1996	2195162	14.1
Colin visits Kelly and announces that he has kicked his cocaine habit. Kelly maintains that they are bad for one another and breaks up with him. Kelly gets a roommate, a troubled teenage runaway named Tara. Valerie has the house to herself as Steve and Brandon leave for a ski weekend with Clare, Susan and David. She hooks up with Colin. Susan challenges Brandon to a ski race, and they leave the designated runs. Susan injures her ankle on a jump, and the duo must fight the elements while awaiting a rescue team. Depressed by his split with Valerie, David mopes around the lodge. Everyone keeps introducing him to blonde girls named Mary and it works out pretty well for him. Donna hears news of a medical breakthrough that could save Joe's career. She must convince Joe to pursue the treatment (he doesn't want to get his hopes up), and goad her father into using his connections to Joe's benefit.
167	23	"Leap of Faith"	Christopher Hibler	Ken Stringer	February 28, 1996	2195163	14.1
Brandon and Susan spend the weekend at her parents' house. Susan's mother asks Brandon very intrusive questions during dinner. Mrs. Keats expects Brandon to sleep in the guest room, but Susan sneaks him into her room during the night. Mrs. Keats catches Brandon in bed with Susan the next morning. She expresses her disappointment, and Susan shares her frustration at the expectations placed upon her since her sister's death, leading to Susan's parents tearfully telling Brandon how devastated they were when they buried their child. Kelly and Tara become friends and support each other in rehab. Colin and Valerie's new relationship upsets David and Kelly. Val orders David to mind his own business. Colin's old dealer, Danny, tempts him with some cocaine. Colin agrees to drive him to a drug house in Torrance. When the police arrive, a panicked Colin drives off and leads them on a high-speed chase. The gang watches the chase unfold on television and is shocked to see that Colin is the driver. Joe's older brother Hank comes to town and tries to discourage him from undergoing surgery. Donna suspects that Hank is jealous of Joe's potential to make the pros, as his own football career ended early due to injury, but Hank turns out to be a good guy who ends up supporting his brother in getting treatment for his heart condition. Bruce Thomas later had a recurring role as Val's stepfather, Carl Schmidt.
168	24	"Coming Out, Getting Out, Going Out"	Gilbert M. Shilton	John Whelpley	March 13, 1996	2195164	13.1
Valerie puts the club up as collateral to bail Colin out of jail. She also offers to spring for a high-priced attorney, as the public defender wants to plea bargain. Colin is terrified by the thought of spending time in prison. Kelly comes home from rehab and receives a surprise call from Colin. Donna is put off by the frequent phone calls from a lonely Tara, who runs away from the center. Kelly and Donna pick her up and give her refuge for the night. A medical student asks Kelly on a date. Clare and Susan resolve to reunite Nat and Joan, who have broken up because their relationship lacks its past magic. Clare, Susan, Brandon and Steve organize a romantic evening for the couple. They take them to many of the places that were special to them in 1971 and help them recapture their passion. Joe undergoes successful surgery and plans to return to football.
169	25	"Smashed"	Charles Correll	Meredith Stiehm	March 20, 1996	2195165	13.7
Rush dumps Ryan and Austin off on their brother Steve on the same day that he is hosting a fraternity party. He doesn't keep a close eye on the boys, and they drink everything in sight. Ryan becomes very ill, and Greg (Kelly's med student date) diagnoses him with alcohol poisoning. He has to be rushed to the hospital, and his father blames Steve before being unusually perceptive and apologizing by saying he's just scared of what might happen to his son. Kelly invites Tara to stay with her after she finishes her stint in rehab. Tara becomes enraged when Kelly dates Greg, as she wants all of Kelly's attention. Colin's lawyer recommends that he pleads guilty in exchange for a short sentence at a minimum-security facility. Valerie persuades him to take the deal. Val goads Colin into attending Steve's party, but bristles when he shares a tender moment with Kelly. Donna and David videotape the party for a late-night campus program called C.U. Later.
170	26	"Flirting with Disaster"	David Semel	John Eisendrath	April 3, 1996	2195166	12.8
Brandon, Steve and Joe go on a camping trip with Susan, Clare and Donna. The girls become jealous when the guys repeatedly ignore them to help some damsels in distress. Clare, Donna and Susan offer shelter to the tentless girls, and make their boyfriends sleep in the car. Kelly feels guilty about leaving Tara alone to go bowling with Greg; she convinces David to make it a double date. Tara sabotages Kelly's relationship with Greg. Valerie tries to arrange a truce between Colin and his estranged father, an artist who lost his sight in Vietnam. Colin is afraid to reveal his legal problems, but Mr. Robbins already knows the truth and has come to offer his support.
171	27	"Strike the Match"	James Darren	Steve Wasserman	April 10, 1996	2195167	12.1
Kelly tries to coax Tara into moving out, as the hospital has found her a place to live. Tara retrieves some belongings, including her photography equipment, from a friend. Kelly does not realize that Tara has a gun in her suitcase. After Kelly speaks of her hatred for Valerie, Tara sneaks out during the night and keys "Die Val" on the side of Valerie's car. Val believes that Kelly is responsible, while Colin gets into a fight with David (who had earlier given him a lot of attitude). Tara freaks everyone out by copying Kelly's hair style and color. Donna and David film a music video for an up and coming band. Donna must appear in the video after the female star fails to show. Joe is unhappy to see her dancing around in a revealing outfit. The Boston Globe offers Brandon a summer internship and chance at a great post-college job. He rejects the offer because he and Susan had already planned a cross-country trip for the summer. Clare stays with Steve while cramming for the graduate school entry test with Brandon, Susan and Joe. Steve accidentally ruins her beloved shawl--a keepsake of her mother's--in the wash. Clare is devastated but forgives Steve because his intentions were pure. This episode features a special appearance by Powerman 5000.
172	28	"The Big Hurt"	Frank Thackery	Larry Mollin	May 1, 1996	2195168	11.8
Tara makes a pass at Brandon and purposely overfeeds Kelly's fish. Kelly orders her to move out. Kelly snoops in Tara's suitcase and discovers that she had lied when she claimed not to know her parents' whereabouts. Kelly enrages Tara by calling her parents. Tara holds Kelly at gunpoint and forces her to go for a drive up the coast. Kelly tries to escape when they pull over, but Tara knocks her out. She ties up Kelly, hooks a hose up to the car, and plans to kill Kelly and herself through carbon monoxide poisoning. Kelly tricks Tara into untying her, then gets the gun away. Tara is admitted to a psychiatric hospital, and her mother thanks Kelly for saving her life. The judge nixes the deal between Colin's lawyer and the district attorney. Citing the fact that he endangered lives with his hazardous driving, he sentences Colin to two years in prison. Carl, a prince and longtime friend of Clare's family, comes for a visit. He makes friends with Steve and tries to prove that he is not the brat that Clare remembers. Joe tries to convince Donna to tone down the racy content of the music video. David bows to Donna's wishes and makes the cuts, but they revert to the original version and obtain a contract to direct three more videos. Joe apologizes to Donna and admits that he is jealous of her relationship with David. This episode features a special appearance by Powerman 5000.
173	29	"Ticket to Ride"	Anson Williams	Meredith Stiehm & John Whelpley	May 8, 1996	2195169	11.8
Colin tries to remain strong as he prepares to turn himself in and begin his prison term. He panics after catching a glimpse of some fellow inmates, and drives away in Val's car. Valerie must track him down or forfeit her $100,000 bond, which she acquired by cashing in the club's equity. Colin stops by Kelly's apartment in search of help, but she turns him away. When Valerie asks Kelly for information about Colin, Kelly angrily denies having seen him. Brandon and Susan lose a $5,000 lottery ticket, leading to a major argument. They find the ticket, but give the money to charity because they feel guilty about fighting over money. Joe expresses disappointment at his slow progress as he returns to training. He realizes that he has lost his passion for football. Clare feels uneasy about Steve's friendship with Carl. Steve falls down the stairs by tripping on a dropped sock and suffers a broken jaw. Clare is touched when Carl offers to help care for him.
174	30	"Ray of Hope"	Gilbert M. Shilton	Story by : Jessica Klein; Teleplay by : Phil Savath	May 15, 1996	2195170	12.3
Kelly agrees to help with the search for Colin when Brandon reveals that Nat could fall victim to the bail bondsman through his business ties to Valerie. Kelly gets in touch with Colin after obtaining his beeper number from Danny. She arranges a meeting and contacts the cops, but Colin realizes that something is amiss and sends Danny to the rendezvous. Donna balks when she and David are asked to produce a music video for Ray, who asks for a chance to prove that he has changed. Donna accepts the project after meeting Ray's fiance, Wendy. Joe decides to quit football and take over as coach at his high school in Pennsylvania. He asks Donna to marry him. She turns him down because she fears that she would regret sacrificing her dreams. Clare is drawn toward Carl as they share memories of her mother. Mrs. Arnold believed that Carl would one day marry Clare and make her a princess. While Steve recuperates from his jaw injury, he and Brandon sit around watching Vega$, The Love Boat, and other Spelling Productions shows. This episode promotes music from both present and former cast members. Jamie Walters returns in a guest role as the reformed Ray to perform a song from his second album, Ride, while the establishing shots feature "You Send Me," a track from Brian Green's rap album One Stop Carnival.
175	31	"You Say It's Your Birthday"	Michael Lange	Larry Mollin & Steve Wasserman	May 22, 1996	2195171A	12.3
176	32	"You Say It's Your Birthday"	Michael Lange	Larry Mollin & Steve Wasserman	May 22, 1996	2195171B	12.3
Colin plans to board a ship and sneak out of the country. He convinces Claudia, his former art dealer, to wire him the $10,000 passage fee. Valerie seeks Jonesy's help to track down Colin, and he sends her a handsome FBI agent. Carl throws Steve a huge 21st birthday bash aboard the Queen Mary and invites all his friends. Andrea surprises Steve by flying in for the party. David and Donna put together a video birthday greeting from friends and relatives who couldn't make the party. They send an inquiry to Brenda's address (she is actually on tour in Scotland), but receive a reply from Dylan. David helps Donna fight off the advances of their lecherous boss. She cools him off by revealing that she is a virgin, and he decides to hit on Kelly instead. Susan receives a chance to work on the presidential campaign. Brandon does not want her to go, and reminds her that he turned down his newspaper job in favor of their summer trip. Joan feels under the weather as she and Nat attend Steve's party. Carl tells Steve that he is in love with Clare; he asks him to give Clare the chance to choose between them. The rock band Goo Goo Dolls performs at Steve's party. Carl professes his love for Clare, who is furious that Steve seems willing to let her go. He tries to prove himself by punching Carl, but only angers her further. Susan takes the job in Washington, effectively ending her relationship with Brandon. Brandon and Steve decide to leave the ship and get drunk. Steve argues with a weirdo at the bar, touching off a brawl. During the fracas, Brandon and Steve see Colin running out of the bar. Steve and Brandon are arrested, but the bar owner does not press charges. Colin panics after being recognized and fails to board the freighter. Brandon, Steve, Valerie and Kelly see Colin on the street; the guys chase him and hold him at bay until the police arrive and finally take Colin away. Valerie gets a date with the FBI agent, who considers a transfer to Los Angeles. Clare rejects Carl's overtures because she is in love with Steve. Joan and Nat are shocked to learn that she is pregnant. When they try to share the news with Brandon, Nat instead announces their engagement. David and Donna get carried away while drinking on the ship, as she proves that she still cannot handle her champagne. They later decide to give their relationship another try. Inspired by the news that Brenda and Dylan are living together in the UK, Kelly asks Brandon for another chance. He suggests that they wait awhile to ensure that they are not on the rebound. This episode features a special appearance by Goo Goo Dolls, as well as guest appearances from Gabrielle Carteris, James Eckhouse and Carol Potter.
