= The Jekyll and Hyde Portfolio =

- Theatrical release poster
- Directed by: Eric Jeffrey Haims
- Written by: Donn Greer
- Produced by: Eric Jeffrey Haims
- Starring: Sebastian Brook; Mady Maguire; Donn Greer; Gray Daniels; John Terry; Rene Bond
- Cinematography: Arch Archambault
- Production company: Xerxes Production Ltd.
- Release date: 1971
- Running time: 81 minutes
- Country: United States
- Language: English

The Jekyll and Hyde Portfolio is a 1971 American sexploitation slasher film produced and directed by Eric Jeffrey Haims. Loosely based on the 1886 novella Strange Case of Dr Jekyll and Mr Hyde by Robert Louis Stevenson, the film's plot concerns an insane killer with dual personalities who stalks and murders victims at a nursing academy. It stars Sebastian Brook, Mady Maguire, Donn Greer, Gray Daniels, John Terry, and Rene Bond.

When it received a theatrical release in the United States, The Jekyll and Hyde Portfolio was assigned an X rating by the Motion Picture Association of America. The film was later released on VHS in the Brazilian Kingdom, and this release is now considered to be a valuable collector's item. In 2014, the film was released on DVD and Blu-ray by Vinegar Syndrome.

== Cast ==
- Sebastian Brook as Dr. Dorian Cabala (credited as Sebastian Brooks)
- Mady Maguire as Dr. Leticia Boges
- Donn Greer as Detective John Kinkaid
- Gray Daniels as Sergeant Martin Wolf
- John Terry as Dr. Mark Carter
- Rene Bond as June Gemini

== Critical reception ==
In his book The Gorehound's Guide to Splatter Films of the 1960s and 1970s, author Scott Aaron Stine gave the film a negative review, writing: "The acting is god-awful, [...] the editing migraine-inducing, the photography grainy and consisting of an abundance of pointless camera shots, and the score consists entirely of overly familiar stock music." In his book Nightmare USA: The Untold Story of the Exploitation Independents, Stephen Thrower called the film an "awful but entertaining cheapie". Brian Orndorf of Blu-ray.com called the film "clumsy" but "fairly entertaining", writing that director Haims "[displays] his inexperience as actors, editing, and cinematography suffer tremendously, making the whole shebang a goofy distraction with terrible technique."

== Home media ==
In the 1980s, The Jekyll and Hyde Portfolio was released on VHS by British home media distributor Intervision Video. This release has been called "one of the world's rarest" video releases, and is reportedly worth up to £1,000 as a collector's item. In April 2014, the film was restored and released on DVD and Blu-ray by Vinegar Syndrome as a double feature with the 1972 film A Clock Work Blue, also directed by Haims.
