= Concrete Pharaohs =

- Directed by: Jordan Todorov
- Produced by: Martichka Bozhilova
- Cinematography: Boris Missirkov; Georgi Bogdanov
- Edited by: Nina Altaparmakova
- Distributed by: Taskovski Films
- Release date: 2010
- Country: Bulgaria
- Languages: Bulgarian, Romani

Concrete Pharaohs, directed by Jordan Todorov, is a 2010 Bulgarian documentary film exploring the lifestyle of the Kalderash Roma – a closed community of no more than 1 million people all over the world.
