= Plamen =

Plamen is a Bulgarian masculine given name. It may refer to:

- Plamen Dimov (footballer) (born 1990), Bulgarian soccer player
- Plamen Donev (born 1956), former Bulgarian footballer who currently manages PFC Svetkavitsa
- Plamen Getov (born 1959), retired Bulgarian footballer who played as either an attacking midfielder or a striker
- Plamen Goranov Bulgarian protest leader and self-immolator
- Plamen Grozdanov (born 1950), the Ambassador Extraordinary and Plenipotentiary of the Republic of Bulgaria to the Russian Federation
- Plamen Iliev (goalkeeper) (born 1991), Bulgarian football goalkeeper
- Plamen Kolev (born 1988), Bulgarian footballer
- Plamen Konstantinov (born 1973), former Bulgarian volleyball player and captain of the Bulgaria men's national volleyball team
- Plamen Kozhuharov (born 1992), Bulgarian football player, currently playing as a midfielder
- Plamen Krachunov (born 1989), Bulgarian footballer who currently plays as a defender
- Plamen Kralev (born 1973), Bulgarian racing driver and businessman
- Plamen Krastev (born 1958), retired Bulgarian Olympic hurdler
- Plamen Krumov (footballer born 1975), Bulgarian forward
- Plamen Krumov (footballer, born 1985), Bulgarian defender/midfielder
- Plamen Markov (born 1957), retired Bulgarian international footballer who played as a midfielder
- Plamen Maslarov (1950–2010), Bulgarian film director and theater director, head of the Bulgarian National Film Archive 2004–2010
- Plamen Minev (born 1965), former hammer thrower from Bulgaria, who competed for his native country at two Summer Olympics
- Plamen Nikolov (footballer born 1957) (born 1957), former Bulgarian football defender
- Plamen Nikolov (footballer born 1961) (born 1961), Bulgarian football goalkeeper
- Plamen Nikolov (footballer born 1985) (born 1985), Bulgarian footballer
- Plamen Petrov (born 1985), Bulgarian football player

== See also ==
- M-63 Plamen, Yugoslav multiple rocket launcher
- Novi Plamen (English: New Flame) is a left-wing magazine for political, social and cultural issues aimed at intellectual readers in the former Yugoslavia
