= Orgy of the Dead =

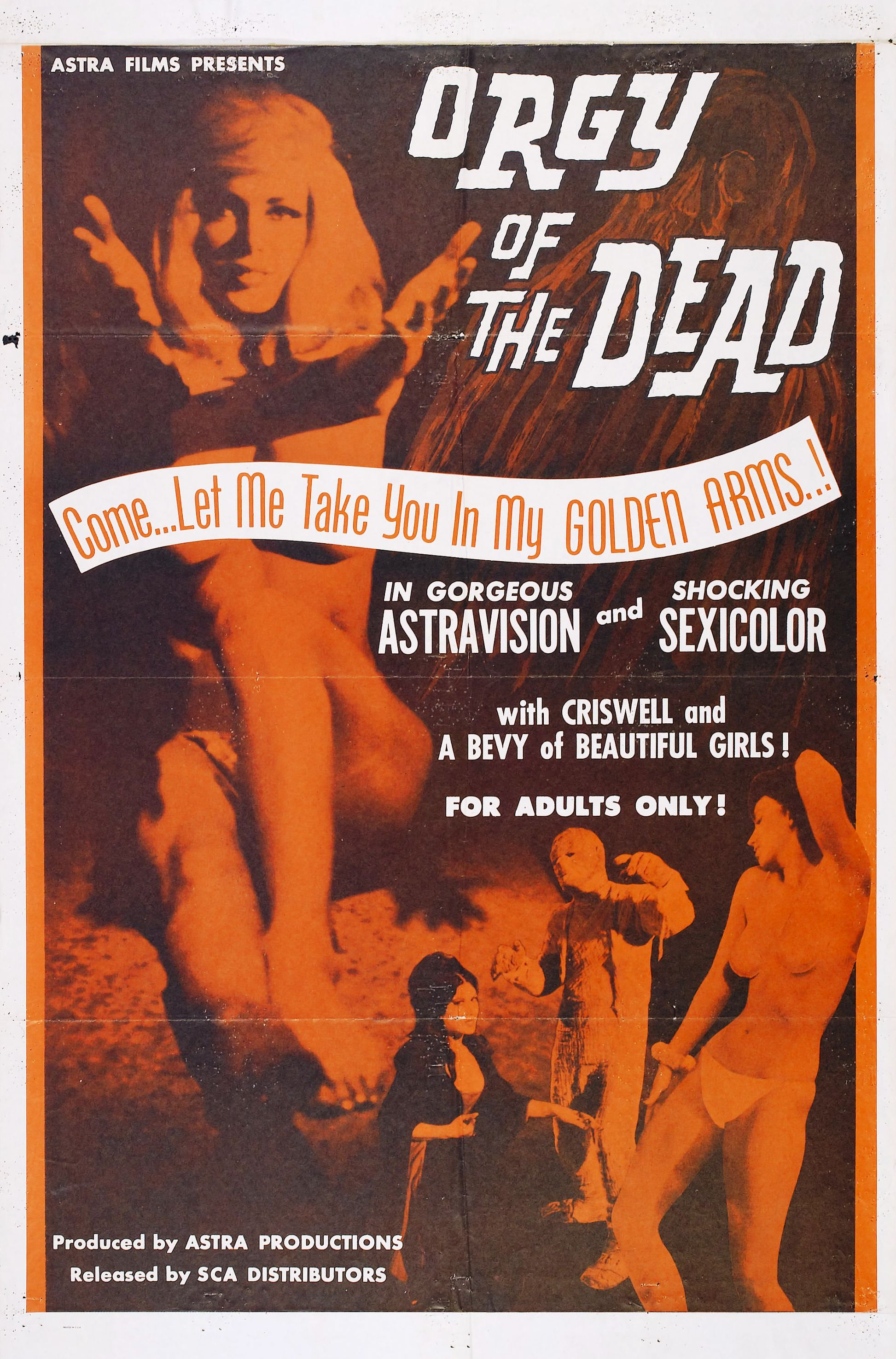
- Theatrical release poster
- Directed by: A. C. Stephen
- Written by: Ed Wood
- Based on: Orgy of the Dead; 1966 novel by Edward Davis Wood, Jr.
- Produced by: A. C. Stephen
- Starring: Criswell; Fawn Silver; Pat Barringer
- Cinematography: Robert Caramico
- Edited by: Donald A. Davis
- Music by: Jaime Mendoza-Nava
- Distributed by: Crown International Pictures
- Release date: June 1, 1965
- Running time: 92 minutes
- Country: United States
- Language: English
- Budget: $10,000

Orgy of the Dead is a 1965 American erotic horror film directed by Stephen C. Apostolof (under the alias A. C. Stephen) and written by cult film director Ed Wood, who also adapted the screenplay into a novel. The film belongs to the genre of "nudie-cuties", defined as narrative-based films featuring female nudity, that originated from earlier films featuring striptease performances and burlesque shows.

Orgy of the Dead stars Criswell, Fawn Silver, and Pat Barringer. It was distributed by Crown International Pictures.

== Plot ==
Two muscle-bound men dressed in loincloths approach a crypt and open the doors, revealing a coffin. They remove the lid and exit the tomb. The coffin's inhabitant, "The Emperor", sits up to deliver an opening narration.

While driving down a California desert road, Bob and Shirley argue over the decision to use this night to search for a cemetery. Bob is a horror writer who hopes that the scene of a cemetery at night will bring him inspiration. The conversation ends when Bob accidentally drives the car off the road and over a cliff.

At night, in a fog-shrouded cemetery, the Emperor sits on a marble altar and summons his "Princess of the Night", the Black Ghoul. She appears and bows before him. If the night's entertainment fails to please him, he will banish the souls of the entertainers to eternal damnation, as he is an all-powerful demonic being.

The Black Ghoul summons the first dancer of the night, a Native American woman who loved fire. She and her lovers died in flames. She dances and strips before the flames of the cemetery. The Black Ghoul then introduces the second dancer of the night, a streetwalker in life. While the woman dances, Bob and Shirley make their way to the cemetery and observe from a distance.

The Emperor summons the third dancer, a woman who worshiped gold. The Golden Girl dances, and the Emperor instructs his servants to reward her with gold. This is soon revealed to be a punishment, as the servants place her in a cauldron with liquid gold. What emerges from the pot is a golden statue of the woman which is then transported to a crypt.

A werewolf and a mummy appear and seize Bob and Shirley, and the Emperor orders that they be tied up and keep watching the dances. Next, the Black Ghoul introduces a "Cat Woman" who is dressed in a leopard costume. As she dances, a servant follows her around and thrashes her with a bullwhip.

Next, the Emperor calls for a Slave Girl to be whipped for his amusement. Following her torture session, she breaks free and becomes the fifth dancer. Later, the Black Ghoul exhibits a fascination with Shirley. Drawing a knife, she is about to kill Shirley when the Emperor tells her to stop. The Black Ghoul reluctantly obeys.

The Emperor is puzzled when a human skull appears instead of the next dancer. The Black Ghoul explains it symbolizes the sixth dancer, who loved bullfighting and matadors. She used to dance over their demise, and now it is time to dance over her own. The dancer of apparent Spanish/Mexican heritage appears to perform. The seventh dancer is dressed in Polynesian garments. She is a worshiper of snakes, smoke, and flames. A rattlesnake accompanies her dance. The mummy voices his dislike of snakes and recalls the death of Cleopatra.

Next, the Emperor expresses his boredom and demands "unusual" entertainment, while the Black Ghoul notes that the night is almost over, and they will be gone at the first sight of the morning sun. They proceed to argue over Shirley's fate. The argument ends with the introduction of the eighth dancer, a woman who murdered her husband on their wedding night. She dances with the skeleton of her spouse. The argument over Shirley then resumes, as the Ghoul claims her for her own, while the Emperor asserts his own authority over the Black Ghoul.

The ninth dancer was a zombie in life and remains zombie-like in death. The tenth and final dancer is introduced as one who died for feathers, fur, and fluff. She starts her dance in clothing matching this style. When the last dance ends, the Emperor finally offers Shirley to the Ghoul. The Ghoul briefly dances herself as she prepares to claim her prize, but dawn arrives. The Emperor and all his undead are reduced to bones. Bob and Shirley then wake up at the accident scene, surrounded by paramedics, suggesting it was all a dream. The Emperor offers parting words to the audience.

== Cast ==
- Criswell as The Emperor
- Fawn Silver as The Black Ghoul
- Pat Barrington (as Pat Barringer) as Shirley/Golden Girl
- William Bates as Bob
- John Andrews as the Wolfman
- Louis Ojena as the Mummy
- Bunny Glaser as Indian dancer
- Mickey Jines as Hawaiian dancer
- Rene de Beau as Fluff dancer
- Colleen O'Brien as Street Walker dancer
- Lorali Hart (credited as Texas Starr) as the Cat dancer
- Dene Starnes as Zombie dancer
- Stephanie Jones as Mexican dancer
- Nadejda Klein as the Slave girl dancer
- Rod Lindeman as the Giant
- Barbara Nordin as Skeleton girl

== Production and casting ==
Orgy of the Dead is an example of a "nudie-cutie" film, a genre of narrative-based films featuring female nudity. Such films were an evolution of earlier films, which featured striptease performances and burlesque shows. These predecessors mostly depicted actual stage performances, sometimes attached to a frame story.

Apostolof was attracted to Orgy of the Dead because the film was "relatively very inexpensive" to produce and direct.

The film's graveyard prologue is a recreation of the opening scene from Wood's then-unreleased 1958 film Night of the Ghouls. Originally, Wood titled the film's script Night of the Ghouls, as he did not expect the 1958 film to ever be released. The film also had a working title, Ghoulies.

The action begins when a young couple, Bob (William Bates) and Shirley (sexploitation actress Pat Barrington, billed as Pat Barringer) survive a car crash only to find themselves tied to posts in a misty cemetery, where they are forced to watch dead spirits dance for the Emperor of the Night played by Criswell (best known for Plan 9 from Outer Space). Criswell reprises his role from the earlier film. Wood persuaded Apostolof to cast his friend Criswell in the film. His lines were written on cue cards, which he had difficulty reading because he wasn't wearing his glasses.

Ten striptease performances by topless dancers outfitted in various motifs comprise most of this movie. The Wolf Man (wearing a very obvious mask, with the actor's bare neck visible below the bottom of the mask) and the Mummy are also tossed in for comic relief. Barrington doubles as the blond Golden Girl (inspired by Shirley Eaton in Goldfinger) while her red-headed "Shirley" character watches her perform. The dancing has been described as awkward and wooden, probably exacerbated by Apostolof firing the dance coordinator during the shooting of the film.

Criswell's undead consort, Black Ghoul, was allegedly written for Maila Nurmi, a.k.a. Vampira, but was instead played by Fawn Silver, who wore a black bouffant wig. The Black Ghoul appears to have "pasty white skin", with red fingernails and lipstick. She wears a black dress, implying the role of a funerary garment. Black, red, and white are the main colors associated with her.

Wood served as writer, production manager, casting agent, and even held up cue cards on the film, although he did not direct. Apostolof paid Wood $400 for the script. Several gaffes typical for Wood-associated projects are present, such as day-for-night issues, poor integration of stock footage, obviously fake props and absurd dialogue (for example, at one point, Criswell declares something to be "more than a fact").

Wood allegedly stole money from the film's budget to purchase alcohol for himself. Apostolof remarked later in interviews that Wood was drinking so heavily during the production, at times he was almost unconscious with his eyes rolled up in his head. Bob Caramico the cameraman, described Wood as just "living from day to day". He advised Wood's friend John Andrews, "If I were you, I wouldn't have anything to do with him." The incident caused a falling-out between Apostolof and Wood, and the two men would not collaborate again until 1972.

An article on the making of this film was published in the June 1998 issue of Femme Fatales.

== Analysis and reception ==
Film journalists Andrew J. Rausch and Charles E. Pratt describe the film's attempt at eroticism as juvenile, with a puerile focus on jiggling breasts. They write that the viewer "just has to sit back in awe and speculate how something like this could come from the mind of a grown man".

TV Guide criticized the film's "boring" striptease performances and music, but praised Wood's dialog as "priceless".

Allmovie critic Mark Deming stated that the film "moves like molasses on a cold morning", and that Orgy of the Dead "is that rare film that would have been improved if Ed Wood had directed it".

== Home media ==
In September 2017, the film was restored in 2K and released on DVD and Blu-ray by Vinegar Syndrome.

== See also ==
- Ed Wood filmography

== Bibliography ==
- Craig, Rob (2009). "Orgy of the Dead (1965)". Ed Wood, Mad Genius: A Critical Study of the Films. McFarland & Company. ISBN 978-0786454235.
- Grey, Rudolph (1994). Ed Wood: Nightmare of Ecstasy - The Life and Art of Edward D. Wood, Jr. Feral House. ISBN 978-0-922915-24-8.
- Thompson, Brett (Director) (1995). The Haunted World of Edward D. Wood, Jr (Film).
