= Stephen C. Apostolof =

Bulgarian-American film director

- Born: Stefan Hristov Apostolov; February 25, 1928; Burgas, Bulgaria
- Died: August 14, 2005 (aged 77); Mesa, Arizona, United States
- Other names: A. C. Stephen; Robert Lee; The Prince of Confidential
- Occupations: Producer, Film director, Scriptwriter
- Years active: 1956–1978
- Notable work: Orgy of the Dead, Fugitive Girls
- Style: Camp, Sexploitation, Nudie-cutie, Costume film, Caper
- Spouses: Joan (m. 1953–1963) (4 children) Patricia J. Rudl (m. 1964–1965) Barbara Cooper (m. 1972–2005) (1 child)

Stephen C. Apostolof (February 25, 1928 – August 14, 2005), sometimes credited under aliases A.C. Stephen(s) or Robert Lee, was a Bulgarian-American filmmaker specializing in low-budget exploitation and erotic films, who gained a cult following for a wide variety of films that range from erotic horror (Orgy of the Dead) and suburban exposé (Suburbia Confidential) to western-themed costume pictures (Lady Godiva Rides) and Mission Impossible-type capers such as (Hot Ice). Apostolof had gained a reputation for creating high-quality mass entertainment with minimal budgets. He was also one of the few directors to work steadily with the infamous Ed Wood and such sexploitation icons as Marsha Jordan and Rene Bond in the 1960s and 1970s.

== Early life ==
Apostolof was born in the Black Sea town of Burgas, Bulgaria, to Hristo Apostolov, a can manufacturer, and his wife Polyxena. Apostolof had a brother, Stavri, and two sisters, Vesa and Lila. The Apostolofs were an artistically inclined family. Steven attended a German-language high school for several years. In 1946, when he was only 17, he joined an underground guerilla group that fought the newly established Communist regime in Bulgaria. He was eventually arrested and spent 18 months in jail.

In 1948, he escaped from Bulgaria by stowing away on a Finnish freighter. He was caught in Turkish territorial waters and thrown in jail for several months, accused of being a Bulgarian spy. After a short stay in Istanbul he drifted to Paris, France. After serving in the French Foreign Legion, in 1950 he moved, this time to Canada, and from there in 1952 he went to Los Angeles, California, where he became a clerk for Bank of America.

== Career ==
=== 1950s ===
Apostolof's career in films began at 20th Century-Fox, where he was doing some number-crunching in the production department in 1953–1954.

==== Journey to Freedom (1957) ====
Around 1955, Apostolof teamed up with exploitation veterans Robert C. Dertano and William C. Thompson to create SCA Productions, a company that produced the semi-autobiographical Cold War melodrama Journey to Freedom (1957). The film starred Tor Johnson, the Swedish wrestler best known for appearing in Edward D. Wood Jr.'s movies Bride of the Monster (1954), Plan 9 from Outer Space (1959) and Night of the Ghouls (1959).

Journey to Freedom was shot in the legendary Sunset Gower Studios and later picked up for distribution by Republic Pictures, known for its quality B-movies and westerns, many of them starring John Wayne. Although not very popular at the time, Journey to Freedom became part of the so-called Red Scare, a period of intense anti-Communism that had already produced propaganda films like I Married a Communist (1949), The Red Menace (1949) and Big Jim McLain (1952). Journey to Freedom tells about Apostolof's escape from Communist Bulgaria through Istanbul, Paris and Toronto to Los Angeles, California.

=== 1960s ===
In the mid-'60s Apostolof became involved in sexploitation cinema, adopting the less foreign-sounding "A.C. Stephen" as a nom de plume. Apostolof cites Russ Meyer's The Immoral Mr. Teas (1959), the first nudie-cutie, as a major influence in his sexploitation-oriented career. He said, "I saw what was happening in the market—I couldn't possibly compete with the major companies, but I saw a niche there for us, the independent guys. I saw those sexy type of pictures that were becoming popular. I went and saw them and I wanted to see how far you could go with nudity." Over the next two decades Apostolof made 16 films with a trademark blend of tasteful nudity and campy humour.

==== Orgy of the Dead (1965) ====
Orgy of the Dead, Apostolof's first directorial credit as A.C. Stephen with a screenplay by Ed Wood, is now considered a camp classic and has inspired a cult following. It features the legendary oracle The Amazing Criswell (known from Wood's Plan 9 from Outer Space) and burlesque queen Pat Barrington (later to star in Harry H. Novak's The Agony of Love). Wood served as writer, production manager, casting agent, and even held up cue cards for Criswell, although he did not direct. Orgy of the Dead was the beginning of a very successful partnership between Apostolof and Wood that would last until the latter's death in 1978. This cooperation resulted in several films that captured the zeitgeist of the late 1960s and the 1970s.

==== Suburbia Confidential (1966) ====
Apostolof's next film, Suburbia Confidential, uses psychiatry largely to set up sex scenes but also to give the film some semblance of "redeeming social value". According to the promotional materials, the film "starts where the Kinsey report left off". In Suburbia Confidential psychiatrist Dr. Henri Legrand reviews the files of several sexually frustrated suburban housewives who are shown having sex with salesmen, bellboys and repairmen. The film includes scenes of bondage, lesbianism and a transvestite based on Apostolof's frequent collaborator Ed Wood. Suburbia Confidential is the first in a series of three films made by Apostolof in the late 1960s dealing with the "confidential" sexual life of different groups of people, the other two being Motel Confidential and College Girl Confidential.

==== College Girl Confidential (1968) ====
Apostolof was busy in 1968, with College Girl Confidential and Office Love-in, White-Collar Style.

Office Love-in, White-Collar Style features voluptuous sexploitation icon Marsha Jordan and brunette Kathy Williams, among others, in a series of vignettes surrounding sex in and with people in an office. Williams and Jordan have a lesbian encounter and a gay transvestite is talked into experimenting with a woman who deep throats bananas. Office Love-in, White-Collar Style also features Colleen Murphy (the star of Alice in Acidland) and Forman Shane, who was in just about all of Apostolof's films.

=== 1970s ===
==== Drop Out Wife (1972) ====
Ed Wood co-wrote

==== The Class Reunion (1972) ====
Ed Wood co-wrote

==== The Snow Bunnies (1972) ====
Ed Wood co-wrote

==== The Cocktail Hostesses (1973) ====
Ed Wood co-wrote

==== Five Loose Women (1974) ====
Ed Wood co-wrote, played two roles on screen, another off, voiced the trailer

==== The Beach Bunnies (1976) ====
A soft core film made with Ed Wood as a co-screenwriter.

==== Hot Ice (1978) ====
Hot Ice, Apostolof's last picture, was an attempt at making a caper movie with an intricate plot and more action than usual in his films. It tells the story of a pair of male and female con artists who go into hiding at a ski lodge. Wood had a role, but it got axed due to his drinking. He was an assistant director.

Hot Ice marks the demise of classic sexploitation cinema with its content absorbed into mainstream movies. Hardcore porn films had gained a firm foothold in the theatrical market by this point and had pushed out much of the "soft-core" product. The advent of the home video market in the late '70s also accelerated the decline of the sexploitation genre.

Apostolof's struggles to finance another film project—or even a sequel to his successful "Orgy of the Dead"—in the late '70s were doomed to failure. The sheer numbers of hardcore porn films available on video—which could be viewed at home, rather than the consumer having to go to a public theater—pretty much killed the "sexploitation" theatrical market. At the beginning of the decade Apostolof found his way into film distribution. He owned the rights to all of his films and spent the '80s and '90s reselling them on the home video / DVD market.

== Unrealized projects ==
Apostolof developed several film ideas that never saw completion (e.g., Wood-scripted The Teachers, The Basketballers). The most notable of these were a sequel to his most successful film Orgy of the Dead called The New Generation and a thriller entitled State of Fear. In the early '90s he was also planning on shooting a documentary on his own life and career.

== Personal life ==
Apostolof was married three times. His first marriage was to a woman named Joan, and it produced four children: Maria, Susan, Polly and Steve. In 1964, after divorcing Joan, he married Patricia J. Rudl, but three years later they divorced. In 1973 he met and married Shelley Barbara Cooper and had a son Christopher. After the 1994 Northridge earthquake, Apostolof moved with Shelley to Las Vegas, Nevada, and then to Mesa, Arizona.

=== Religion ===
Although he was part of one of the most "liberated" industries and most of his films had a strong sexual content, Apostolof himself was a very religious man. On December 8, 1961, he and Dr. Matthew Jeikoff along with other Bulgarian emigres founded "St. George", the first Bulgarian Orthodox church in Los Angeles. The church had strong ties to Simeon II, the Bulgarian king in exile, and soon became a bulwark of Bulgarian anti-Communists and monarchists in Los Angeles.

== Death ==
Near the end of his life, Apostolof had worked on the script for a projected post-apocalyptic thriller entitled State of Fear. Despite some preliminary work, the story was never filmed. Stephen Apostolof died on August 14, 2005, aged 77 in Mesa, Arizona.

== Legacy ==
Apostolof made 17 feature films in a career that lasted only 20 years. Today Apostolof may not be a household—or even vaguely familiar—name to many, but he and his films have attracted a cult following over the years. His legacy lives on, ridiculed or revered by critics and fans alike. He has taken a permanent place in the B-movie culture and is widely recognized as one of the greatest American erotic filmmakers. In 1987 The Tokyo International Fantastic Film Festival honored him with a special screening of Orgy of the Dead, and all his films were released on video in the 1980s and re-released on DVD in the 1990s and 2000s. In 2007 Legend House released Suburbia Confidential and College Girl Confidential as a double-feature DVD. In 2010 S'More Entertainment reissued three of Apostolof's films on DVD complete with original trailers and stills. In 2011 Apostolof was the subject of a documentary entitled Dad Made Dirty Movies. In April 2007 the British film magazine Sight & Sound listed him among the most prominent figures in sexploitation genre.

He was dubbed the "Prince of Confidential" because of his series of films with the word "confidential" in the title.

Actor Marty L. Andaluz portrayed a fictional version of Apostolof in the play The Incredible Story of Ed Wood.

In 2006 the Kinsey Institute for Research in Sex, Gender, and Reproduction ran an exhibition called "Sex in the Cinema". A poster from Orgy of the Dead was featured, along with artwork from other prominent sexploitation directors like Russ Meyer, Radley Metzger and Gerard Damiano.

In 2000 Apostolof was canonized as the "patron saint of the pornographers" in the Church of Ed Wood.

== Frequent and memorable collaborators ==
Apostolof worked with the same people more than once. Some of his frequent collaborators include Edward D. Wood Jr., Marsha Jordan, Rene Bond, Harvey Shane (often credited under the alias Forman Shane), Ric Lutze and Vincent Barbi, among others.

=== Cameos ===
Like Alfred Hitchcock, one of the directors Apostolof admired, he appeared briefly in some of his own films. For example, he is seen in Journey to Freedom where he's playing a Frenchman sporting beret and a moustache. In Lady Godiva Rides he is credited under the name One Eye Apostolof. In the beginning of The Beach Bunnies he plays the piano in a restaurant. In The Snow Bunnies he could be spotted sitting in front of a ski chalet together with his third wife Shelley.

== Filmography ==
- 1957 Journey to Freedom
- 1965 Orgy of the Dead
- 1966 Suburbia Confidential
- 1967 Motel Confidential
- 1967 The Bachelor's Dreams
- 1968 Office Love-In aka Office Love-In, White Collar Style
- 1968 College Girls Confidential aka College Girls
- 1968 Lady Godiva Rides
- 1969 The Divorcee
- 1971 Drop Out
- 1972 Drop-Out Wife
- 1972 Class Reunion
- 1972 The Snow Bunnies
- 1973 The Cocktail Hostesses
- 1974 Five Loose Women (also known as Fugitive Girls)
- 1976 The Beach Bunnies
- 1978 Hot Ice
- 1990 Saturday Night Sleazies Vol 1. Documentary
- 1990 Saturday Night Sleazies Vol 2. Documentary
- 1990 Saturday Night Sleazies Vol 3. Documentary
- 1999 The Erotic World of A.C. Stephens
- 2001 Schlock! The Secret History of American Movies Documentary
- 2008 The Lascivious World of A.C. Stephen and Ed Wood, Jr.

== Bibliography ==
- Nightmare of Ecstasy: Life and Art of Edward D. Wood, 1994, by Rudolph Grey
- Shock Cinema (USA), 1999, Iss. 14, pg. 21–23, by: M. Faust, "Shock Cinema Talks With Sexploitation Auteur A.C. Stephen a.k.a. Stephen Apostolof"
- Femme Fatales (USA), June 1998, Vol. 7, Iss. 1, pg. 52–55, + 60–61, by: Laura Schiff, "Orgy of the Dead – Ed Wood's Post-'Plan 9' Legacy: Bonding Spirits and Strippers – in Color!"
- Psychotronic Video (USA), Winter 1990, Iss. 8, pg. 30–38, by: Frank Henenlotter, Johnny Legend, Peter Clark, Bal Croce and Mark Isted, "Stephen C. Apostoloff: Bulgarian nudie director"

== Documentaries ==
- Dad Made Dirty Movies (2011)
- The Haunted World of Edward D. Wood Jr. (1995)
- Ed Wood: Look Back In Angora (1994)
- Flying Saucers Over Hollywood: The Plan 9 Companion (1992)
- The Incredibly Strange Film Show (1989)

== See also ==
- Dad Made Dirty Movies
- Exploitation film
- Ed Wood
