= College Girls =

UK documentary program

- Country of origin: United Kingdom
- No. of episodes: 6 (1 unbroadcast)

Production
- Running time: 60 minutes

Original release
- Network: Channel 4
- Release: 8 September – 6 October 2002

College Girls is a Channel 4 documentary series, first transmitted in the United Kingdom from 8 September 2002. The documentary followed the lives of six students who studied at St Hilda's College, Oxford, the last remaining single-sex college at the University of Oxford, between 1998 and 2001.

== Background ==
Series producer Anna Hall and director Kevin Sim, both former students at the university, developed the idea for the series. They felt a documentary should be made that would show the reality of life as a student at Oxford rather than the clichéd image seen in novels such as Brideshead Revisited. It was felt that choosing St Hilda's would be of additional interest as it would allow "an examination of women at the beginning of the 21st century". The college was in the news due to controversial votes by the fellows as to whether it should retain its single-sex status. The college were concerned for the welfare of students involved in the project, and also feared that they may not be treated fairly by media coverage without any editorial control, but with the support of college fellow Sally Mapstone, permission was granted. The Channel 4 documentary team were allowed access to the college for up to 40 days per year.

== The students ==
The students featured in the series included:

Lucy Aitkens—Student who was ambitious to progress through the ranks of the Oxford Union. Was the primary focus of the second episode, which saw her elected as librarian, only to be stripped of the position through breaking the union's policies on electioneering. Later elected union president and went on to become a Fulbright Scholar at Harvard University.

Natasha ("Tash") Etherington—Languages student from Crystal Palace, London. Admitted she didn't set out to study at Oxford originally and rarely appeared at ease while studying at the college. She said her life felt "so much better in every way" whilst studying in Paris in her third year. Was the college's LGBT representative.

Afshan Ghani—Medicine student from south Wales, of Pakistani origin. Appeared shy when in Oxford. The series saw her visit the poor village where her mother grew up in the Punjab. Took to wearing the hijab.

Ruth Hunt—The college's JCR president. Came out as a lesbian during an interview in the college garden.

Laura Paskell-Brown—A socialist from the Manchester area, who studied Politics. First appears whilst selling the Socialist Worker magazine with her parents. Became embroiled in a storm of controversy surrounding her refusal to pay means-tested tuition fees, which were compulsory for the first time at English universities in 1998. Fell in love with a Conservative and got married in the final episode.

== Reaction ==
The series was filmed at a cost of £1m and was heavily promoted in the national press when first transmitted, as Channel 4's flagship documentary series for the autumn season, and initially received strong praise. The Daily Telegraph commented that "a Hollywood scriptwriter would find it hard to improve on the unfolding storylines", and A. A. Gill rated the series as "one of the best documentaries of this type for years" in The Sunday Times.

However viewing figures were not as high as hoped and, despite the production team being delighted with the project at first, Channel 4 changed their attitude to the show once broadcasts were underway. Tim Gardam, head of programmes at Channel 4, told one of the students involved that the films "lacked life and were too mannered to do justice to the strength of character and interest (the production team) had been allowed to document". The channel shortened the series' run by skipping the fifth episode and instead transmitted the season finale on 6 October 2002.

=== Missing episode ===
Channel 4 were heavily criticised for their decision not to transmit the fifth episode, which discussed the students' sexualities and the latest poll on whether to admit male students and academics. Peter Dale, head of documentaries, denied that the decision was ratings-related; he said the episode was dropped because it was "a little bit pretentious" and felt the series may not have been delivering what the audience wanted. College principal Lady English said that the college was not informed of the decision before the series ended and felt the broadcaster owed the college and the film's participants "an explanation and an apology". She also suggested that the channel should have voiced their complaints about the fifth episode during editing, and not once the broadcast of the series was underway. Ruth Hunt discussed her sexuality on camera in the untransmitted episode and wrote to Channel 4 expressing her "hurt and disappointment" over the handling of the episode. Sally Mapstone felt that the episode that was skipped was key to the story, commenting "the irony is that, by censoring the one film where the girls talk most frankly about themselves, Channel 4 has skewed the whole emphasis of the series".

The decision not to edit the final episode left some plot elements confused- Laura was shown marrying her Conservative partner but their engagement was skipped in the fifth episode.

=== Perceptions of the university, Channel 4's attitude ===
Sally Mapstone also said she feared the series's cancellation was a response to the public perception of Oxford as elitist. Kevin Sim added that he felt that critics of the series were using the show as an excuse to "express their long-cherished hatred of Oxford as an elitist institution". He said it was brave of the network to invest in the series in 1998 but should have publicised it more.

The series was criticised by students in Oxford for appearing to depict an overly intense atmosphere throughout, and for being pre-occupied with scandals, rather than providing a balanced portrayal of life at the university, as it set out to do.

Sim added that the channel's behaviour illustrated a shift from their previously highbrow aspirations and was now very risk-averse in reality: "The programmes were commissioned four years ago, before Channel 4's culture was stood on its head by Big Brother". He asked for his name to be removed from the credits of the final episode.
