= Plamen Grozdanov =

Bulgarian diplomat

Plamen Ivanov Grozdanov (Bulgarian: Пламен Иванов Грозданов) (born 24 September 1950) was the Ambassador Extraordinary and Plenipotentiary of the Republic of Bulgaria to the Russian Federation from October, 2006 to April, 2012.

He graduated in University of National and World Economy in Sofia.

== See also ==
- Embassy of Bulgaria in Moscow
