= Joe E. Tata =

American actor (1936-2022)

- Tata in 2002
- Born: Joseph Evan Tata; September 13, 1936; New York City, New York, U.S.
- Died: August 24, 2022 (aged 85); Los Angeles, California, U.S.
- Occupation: Actor
- Years active: 1960–2014
- Known for: Beverly Hills, 90210
- Spouse: Susan Levy (m. 1976; divorced)
- Children: 1

Joseph Evan Tata (September 13, 1936 – August 24, 2022) was an American television actor. He was known for his regular role (1990–2000) as Nat Bussichio, the owner and operator of the Peach Pit diner, in the television series Beverly Hills, 90210 and its spin-off 90210. A prolific character actor, Tata was previously best known for his portrayal of Private Neddick on No Time for Sergeants (1964–1965), and his roles on dozens of shows including The Rockford Files and Batman.

Tata was diagnosed with Alzheimer's disease in 2018. He died in Los Angeles on August 24, 2022, at the age of 85.

== Early life ==
Joseph Evan Tata was born on September 13, 1936, in The Bronx borough of New York City. His father was John Lucas, a vaudevillian who sometimes performed as Rosey the Singing Barber.

== Career ==
After being cast in his first television role in Peter Gunn in 1960, Tata went on to be a prolific character actor, appearing in dozens of shows in a variety of bit parts. Specializing in science fiction on shows like Lost in Space, Tata first became recognizable for playing henchmen on the original Batman and for his appearances on The Rockford Files.

Tata's most famous role came later in life, when he was cast as Nat Bussichio on the television series Beverly Hills, 90210. Though the show came off to a rocky start, it soon became a massive hit and cultural phenomenon, with Tata's portrayal of the kind father figure who owned the fictional Peach Pit diner earning him acclaim. Across the show's ten seasons, Tata would appear in 238 episodes. When the show was rebooted in the 2000s as 90210, Tata reprised his role on three occasions.

After appearing as Principal Frost on the ABC Family sitcom Mystery Girls in 2014, Tata retired from acting, following a more than five decade career.

== Personal life ==
Tata married Susan Levy on October 30, 1976, and the two subsequently divorced. They had one child, a daughter.

=== Death ===
Tata was diagnosed with Alzheimer's disease in 2018. His daughter Kelly created a GoFundMe page to help cover the cost of his care, which continued after his death to raise money for the Alzheimer's Association. Tata died on August 24, 2022, at a care facility in the Woodland Hills neighborhood of Los Angeles at the age of eighty-five.

Tributes to Tata were paid by a large number of entertainment industry figures, including Beverly Hills, 90210 co-stars Ian Ziering, Jason Priestley, Tori Spelling, Jennie Garth, Vincent Young, and Brian Austin Green, and author Kim Gruenenfelder.

== Filmography ==
Year	Title	Role	Notes
1960	Peter Gunn	Arthur Curtis	1 episode
1963−1964	The Outer Limits	Alien bastard / Radar Operator	2 episodes
1964	Gomer Pyle - U.S.M.C.	Joey Lombardi	2 episodes
1964−1965	No Time for Sergeants	Private Neddick	5 episodes
1964−1966	Ben Casey	Dr. Wayne Marlow / Dr. Michael Stone	2 episodes
1964−1967	Voyage to the Bottom of the Sea	Corpsman / Frank Brent / Farrell	3 episodes
1965	Mister Roberts	Everett	1 episode
1965	Hank	Johnson	1 episode
1966	Hogan's Heroes	Tony Garlotti	Episode: "The Pizza Parlor"
1966	The Time Tunnel	Verlaine / Napoleon Bonaparte	2 episodes
1966−1968	Batman	Goon / Tallow / Suleiman	5 episodes
1966–1972	Mission: Impossible	Al / King Said of Karak / Roulette Croupier	3 episodes
1967	Lost in Space	Short Alien / Robot Judge / Purple Robot / Computer Eye / Zalto's Dumm	5 episodes
1967	Batgirl	Mothman #1	TV short
1968	Cimarron Strip	Gomer	1 episode
1969	The Good Guys	Lab Worker	1 episode
1970	Bracken's World	Wounded G.I.	1 episode
1970	The Immortal	Morrison—Monitor	1 episode
1970	Which Way to the Front?	Corporal	Uncredited
1970	Along Came a Spider	Doctor Hernandez	TV movie
1971	The D.A.	Lt. Ficklen	1 episode
1971	Green Acres	Bellboy	1 episode
1971	D.A.: Conspiracy to Kill		TV movie
1971–1972	O'Hara, U.S. Treasury	Ted Wilson / Dick Miles / Special Agent Bertino	3 episodes
1971–1973	The F.B.I.	Elliot / Al Naylor / Barney Leeds	3 episodes
1971–1973	Mannix	Augie / Fred Eby / Gas Station Attendant	3 episodes
1972	Hickey & Boggs	Coroner's Assistant	(as Joe Tata)
1972	Unholy Rollers	Marshall	
1972	A Clock Work Blue	Homer	
1972-1973	Adam-12	Craig Hanawad / Frank Ducas / Noel Simmons	Episodes: "Sub-Station", "Easy Rap", "Training Division: The Rookie"
1972-1973	Temperatures Rising	Groom / Nails	2 episodes
1973	Emergency!	Neighbor	1 episode
1973	Love, American Style	Chip	1 episode / Segment: "Love and the Burglar Joke"
1974	Ironside	Garvey	1 episode
1974	Toma	Mark	1 episode
1974	It's Good to Be Alive	'Pee Wee' Reese	TV movie
1974−1978	The Rockford Files	Solly Marshall / Sal / Norman Abbott Kline / Mike Trevino / Willie / Agent Hanzer	8 episodes
1975	Cannon	Higgins / Joe Slosser	2 episodes
1975	Death Scream	Detective Linsky	TV movie
1975	Dead Man on the Run	Bobby Dimasco	TV movie
1975	The Last Survivors	Charley	TV movie
1975	Mobile Two	Father John Lucas	TV movie
1975−1978	Police Story	Dooley / Jimmy Ricks / Det. Loftus	3 episodes
1976	Sisters of Death	Joe	(as Joe Tata)
1976	The Streets of San Francisco	Bobby Waldron	1 episode
1976	Monster Squad	Trouble	1 episode
1976	The Blue Knight		1 episode
1977	Barnaby Jones	Little Angel	1 episode
1977	Police Woman	Blat	1 episode
1977	Most Wanted	Toller	1 episode
1977	A Love Affair: The Eleanor and Lou Gehrig Story	Lefty Gomez	TV movie
1977	Kill Me If You Can	Kelton	TV movie
1978	Confessions of the D.A. Man	Lt. Ficklen	TV movie
1978	Quincy, M.E.	Tony DeMarco	Episode: "Accomplice to Murder"
1978	The Bastard	Voice (uncredited)	Television miniseries
1978	Wonder Woman	Joe	Episode: "The Fine Art of Crime"
1978	Terror Out of the Sky	Groves	TV movie
1980	Police Story: Confessions of a Lady Cop		TV movie
1980	Dallas Cowboys Cheerleaders II	Pete	TV movie
1980–1981	Vega$	Vinnie Rilato / Mickey Enright / Dixon	3 episodes
1981	Days of Our Lives	Warren	2 episodes
1981	Jacqueline Susann's Valley of the Dolls	Art Williams	TV miniseries
1983	Hotel	Jimbo	1 episode
1984	Finder of Lost Loves	Nick	1 episode
1984	The Fall Guy	Assistant Director	1 episode
1984	Simon & Simon	Bartender	1 episode
1984	The New Mike Hammer	John Box	1 episode
1985	The A-Team	Bookie McGrudy	Episode: "Champ!"
1985	Hollywood Wives	Elliot	2 episodes
1985	Matt Houston	Dr. Dyre	1 episode
1985	Hollywood Beat	Earl Cain	1 episode
1985	Crazy Like a Fox		1 episode
1986	Hill Street Blues	Fratelli / Fratello	Episodes: "Das Blues", "Slum Enchanted Evening"
1987	General Hospital	Rudy King	Unknown number of episodes
1987	Magnum P.I.	Benny Travis, the P.I.	Episode: "Innocence... A Broad"
1987	High Mountain Rangers	Joseph 'Nitro' Capelli	1 episode
1987	Tales from the Darkside	Alex Hayes	1 episode
1989	Snoops	Finley	1 episode
1989	Jesse Hawkes		1 episode
1990−2000	Beverly Hills, 90210	Nat Bussichio / Sal Bussichio	238 episodes
1991	Hunter	Mr. Trickle	Episode: "The Reporter"
1992	Love Is Like That	Norm	
1996	Terminal	Lt. Johns	TV movie
1999	The Dishpan Man	Gino	Short film
2001	Charmed	Police Inspector	Episode: "Look Who's Barking"
2003	Everyone Counts	Detective	Short film
2008	90210	Nat Bussichio	3 episodes
2014	Mystery Girls	Principal Frost	Episode: "High School Mystery"
