= Journey to Freedom (film) =

1957 film

- Directed by: Robert C. Dertano
- Produced by: Stephen C. Apostolof
- Distributed by: Republic Pictures
- Release date: 21 June 1957
- Running time: 60 minutes
- Country: United States
- Language: English

Journey to Freedom is a 1957 American film. The story follows a Bulgarian who escapes from behind the Iron Curtain through Istanbul, Paris and Toronto to seek freedom in Los Angeles, California, but is doggedly pursued by Communist agents.

The film was written and produced by Apostolof and purportedly semi-autobiographical. The surname of the main character 'Stephen Raikin', takes his surname from the Bulgarian anti-communist activist Spas T. Raikin. For his first film project he sought out exploitation veteran Dertano and the one-eyed cinematographer William C. Thompson to create "SCA Productions". The anti-Communist tone is comparable to other films of the Red Scare: I Married a Communist (1949), The Red Menace (1949) and Big Jim McLain (1952).

The film featured Tor Johnson, the Swedish wrestler best known for appearing in Edward D. Wood Jr.'s movies. It was shot in the Sunset Gower Studios and picked up for distribution by Republic Pictures shortly before they suspended feature film production.

== Cast ==
- Jacques Scott as Stephan Raikin
- Geneviève Aumont as Nanette
- George Graham as James Wright
- Morgan Lane as Nick Popov
- Eve Brent as Mary Raikin
- Peter Besbas as Pete
- Don Mcart as Louie
- Dan O'Dowd as Parisian Friend
- Tor Johnson as Giant Turk
