= Rene Bond =

American actress

- Born: October 11, 1950; San Diego, California, U.S.
- Died: June 2, 1996 (aged 45)
- Occupations: Actress; pornographic actress

Rene Bond (October 11, 1950 – June 2, 1996) was an American actress and pornographic actress. Bond began her acting career in softcore exploitation films produced by Harry Novak in the late 1960s before moving on to hardcore films in the early 1970s. She was active in the 1970s Los Angeles pornography scene, appearing in more than 80 films and loops. She was noted for her petite figure and conveyed innocence or naivete in her acting approach.

== Career ==
Bond starred in a number of softcore exploitation and sexploitation films, including The Jekyll and Hyde Portfolio (1971).

Bond was one of the first porn actresses to get breast implants. In a 1977 interview, she stated that this decision was in response to the "North American Breast Fetish", and claimed that she was offered more roles in films as a result of the implants. By the mid-70s, she had started her own mail-order company, selling still photos of herself and slides from her work. Her parents were aware of her work and accompanied her when she performed at burlesque and strip-tease shows. During these shows, Bond invited a man pretending to be her father on stage, where she performed to the song "My Heart Belongs to Daddy".

Bond described her experiences working as a pornographic actor in a 1976 interview in The Signal: "We used to shoot films called 'One Day Wonders.' I always played the virgin. We usually worked at least 12 hours a day. We were working with constant police pressure [...] There were only about four of us that were not busted at least once. I was very careful," adding that, "I am still fairly straight. I do not go in for those kinky things. But I think I have become more of a woman through my [pornography] work."

Bond was inducted into the AVN Hall of Fame as well as the X-Rated Critics Organization Hall of Fame.

== Later years and death ==
After retiring from acting in the late 1970s, Bond was married for a third time and resided in Las Vegas. She last appeared in the motion picture media during 1986 as a contestant on the television game show "Break the Bank."

On June 2, 1996, she died of cirrhosis at the age of 45.
