= Carey W. Hayes =

American screenwriter and producer (born 1961)

- Born: Portland, Oregon, U.S.
- Occupations: Screenwriter, producer
- Years active: 1984–present
- Relatives: Chad Hayes (brother)

Carey W. Hayes is an American screenwriter and producer. He is the twin brother of Chad Hayes. They are writing partners, and wrote such films as the 2005 remake of House of Wax, The Reaping (2007) and The Conjuring (2013). The two also appeared in Rad, a sports film directed by Hal Needham, as well as Doublemint Gum commercials in their early years of acting in the 1980s.

== Filmography ==
=== Writer ===
- Booker (1989) TV series (unknown episodes)
- The Dark Side of the Moon (1990, written by Chad and Carey Hayes)
- Down, Out & Dangerous (1995) (TV) (written by Chad and Carey)
- Twisted Desire (1996) (TV) (written by Chad and Carey)
- Crowned and Dangerous (1997) (TV) (written by Carey, Chad, and Alan Hines)
- Baywatch (1 episode, 1999)
- First Daughter (1999) (TV) (written by Carey and Chad)
- Horse Sense (1999) (TV) (written by Carey and Chad)
- Shutterspeed (2000) (TV)
- Mysterious Ways (2000) TV series ("Handshake" episode)
- First Target (2000) (TV) (written by) (as Carey W. Hayes)
- Jumping Ship (2001) (TV) (written by) (as Carey W. Hayes)
- Invincible (2001) (TV) (story) (as Carey W. Hayes)
- First Shot (2002) (TV) (written by) (as Carey W. Hayes)
- House of Wax (2005) (screenplay) (as Carey W. Hayes)
- The Reaping (2007) (screenplay) (as Carey W. Hayes)
- The Conjuring (2013) (screenplay) (as Carey W. Hayes)
- The Conjuring 2 (2016) (screenplay)
- The Crucifixion (2017) (as Carey W. Hayes)
- The Turning (2020) (screenplay) (as Carey W. Hayes)
- McClane (cancelled) (screenplay)

=== Producer ===
- The Crow: Stairway to Heaven (1998) TV series (co-producer) (unknown episodes)
- First Daughter (1999) (TV) (co-producer) (as Carey W. Hayes)
- Horse Sense (1999) (TV) (executive producer) (as Carey W. Hayes)
- First Target (2000) (TV) (supervising producer) (as Carey W. Hayes)
- Jumping Ship (2001) (TV) (executive producer) (as Carey W. Hayes)
- First Shot (2002) (TV) (supervising producer) (as Carey W. Hayes)
- Marple: The Sittaford Mystery (2006) (TV) (supervising producer)

=== Actor ===
- Rad (1986) .... Rod Reynolds, twin brother of Rex Reynolds, played by Chad Hayes
