= Chad Hayes (writer) =

American writer and producer

- Born: Portland, Oregon, U.S.
- Occupation(s): Screenwriter, producer
- Years active: 1984–present
- Children: 2
- Relatives: Carey W. Hayes (brother)

Chad Hayes is an American screenwriter and producer, and twin brother of Carey Hayes. They are writing partners, and wrote such films as the 2005 remake of House of Wax, The Reaping (2007) and The Conjuring (2013). He and Carey also starred in Doublemint gum commercials in their childhood.

== Personal life ==
Hayes was born April 21, 1961, in Portland, Oregon, the identical twin brother of Carey Hayes. They were raised Baptist. Chad has two children: Dylan and Hanna.

== Filmography ==
=== Film ===
Year	Film	Credit	Notes
1986	Rad	Rex Reynolds	Played the twin brother of Rod Reynolds, played by Carey Hayes
1987	Lethal Weapon	Mercenary	
1989	Death Spa	Jeffrey	
1990	The Dark Side of the Moon	Written by	Co-wrote with Carey Hayes
1995	Down, Out & Dangerous	Written by	Co-wrote with Carey Hayes, TV movie
1996	Twisted Desire	Written by	Co-wrote with Carey Hayes, TV movie
1997	Crowned and Dangerous	Written by	Co-wrote with Carey Hayes and Alan Hines, TV movie
1998	Suicide Dog Cracker	Bully Kid	Short film
1999	First Daughter	Written by, co-producer	Co-wrote with Carey Hayes, TV movie
1999	Horse Sense	Written by, executive producer	Co-wrote with Carey Hayes, TV movie
2000	First Target		Co-wrote with Carey Hayes, TV movie
2000	Shutterspeed	Written by, supervising producer	Co-wrote with Carey Hayes, TV movie
2001	Jumping Ship		Co-wrote with Carey Hayes, TV movie
2001	Invincible	Story by	Co-wrote with Carey Hayes, TV movie
2002	First Shot	Written by, supervising producer	Co-wrote with Carey Hayes, TV movie
2002	The Source	Boom operator	
2005	House of Wax	Screenplay by	Co-wrote screenplay with Carey Hayes
2007	The Reaping	Written by	Co-wrote screenplay with Carey Hayes
2009	Whiteout	Screenplay by	Co-wrote with Carey Hayes, Erich Hoeber, John Hoeber
2013	The Conjuring	Written by	Co-wrote with Carey Hayes
2014	Annabelle	Co-producer	
2016	The Conjuring 2	Screenplay by, story by, based on the characters created by	Co-wrote screenplay with Carey Hayes, James Wan, David Leslie Johnson, co-wrote story with Carey Hayes, James Wan
2017	The Crucifixion	Written by	Co-wrote with Carey Hayes
2017	She's Here	Based on the characters created by	Short film
2020	The Turning	Screenplay by	Co-wrote with Carey Hayes

=== Television ===
Year	Film	Credit	Notes
1984	Emerald Point N.A.S.	Waiter	1 Episode
1985	Otherworld	Bingo	1 Episode
1985	The Twilight Zone	Peter Iverson	1 Episode
1988	Walt Disney's Wonderful World of Color	Engineer	1 Episode
1990	Booker	Written by	1 Episode, co-wrote with Carey Hayes
1991	The Flash	Story by	1 Episode, co-wrote with Carey Hayes and David L. Newman
1996	Diagnosis Murder	Written by	1 Episode, co-wrote with Carey Hayes
1996-1997	Baywatch Nights	Written by	Written by, story by, teleplay by 5 episodes, 3 episodes, 2 episodes
1998	Ghost Stories	Written by	1 Episode, co-wrote with Carey Hayes
1998	The Crow: Stairway to Heaven	Co-producer	
1999	Baywatch	Written by	1 Episode, co-wrote with Carey Hayes
1999-2000	BeasterMaster	Written by	2 Episodes, co-wrote with Carey Hayes
2000	Mysterious Ways	Written by, supervising producer	1 Episode, co-wrote with Carey Hayes, 12 episodes
2006	Agatha Christie's Marple	Supervising producer	1 Episode
