= One of Her Own =

1994 American television film

- Genre: Drama
- Written by: Valerie West
- Directed by: Armand Mastroianni
- Starring: Lori Loughlin; Greg Evigan; Valerie Landsburg; Martin Sheen
- Theme music composer: George S. Clinton
- Country of origin: United States
- Original language: English

Production
- Executive producers: Jack Grossbart; Joan Barnett
- Production location: Statesville, North Carolina
- Cinematography: Tom Priestley Jr.
- Editors: Tim Boettcher; Robert Florio
- Running time: 91 minutes
- Production companies: Grossbart Barnett Productions; Sydell Albert Productions

Original release
- Network: ABC
- Release: May 16, 1994

One of Her Own is a television film directed by Armand Mastroianni and written by Valerie West, starring Lori Loughlin, Greg Evigan, Valerie Landsburg, and Martin Sheen. Based on a true story, it is about a rookie policewoman who is raped by a fellow officer and struggles to bring charges. It aired on ABC on May 16, 1994.

== Plot ==
Toni Stroud is a small-town rookie police officer who has been given excellent performance reviews from her superiors. Her fellow officer Charlie Lloyd, a veteran of the force, asks to stay in Toni's home after his wife kicks him out. Toni allows Lloyd to sleep on her couch after a night shift, but while she's asleep in her bedroom, he sneaks in and violently rapes her. Fearing the blue wall of silence among cops and the possibility of losing her job, Toni is initially hesitant to report the crime. But when she learns Lloyd has become a suspect in several sexual assaults in the community, she ultimately reports the assault to her superiors.

Her bosses promptly fire Toni from the force and close ranks around Lloyd. Toni takes her case to the district attorney, who files charges against Lloyd. As a result, Stroud and her family are subjected to harassment and vandalism by other officers. She files a lawsuit against her former bosses for illegal termination. During the trial, the police leadership testifies that Toni was fired due to her alleged inadequacy as an officer, but also admits that they failed to investigate Lloyd. Ultimately, the court finds Lloyd guilty.

== Cast ==
- Lori Loughlin as Toni Stroud
- Greg Evigan as Charlie Lloyd
- Valerie Landsburg as Stacy Schoep
- Jeff Yagher as Heller
- Jason Schombing as Weisberg
- Reginald VelJohnson as Det. Bob Hymes
- Martin Sheen as Asst. D.A Pete Maresca
- Sage Cline as courtroom audience member

== Critical reception ==
The Los Angeles Times praised Loughlin's "absorbing" performance, adding, "This is not the first TV movie to deal with the intimidation of female officers in an old boys' police station. But the subject is sufficiently fresh as dramatic entertainment because policewomen are still a comparable novelty." Variety wrote, "While a premise with promise, getting there is laborious and covers well-trod ground, using cliches and insipid banter to convey its points." The St. Louis Post-Dispatch also commended Loughlin, but said the film "offers every victim-fights-back cliché ever".
