= Meadow Sisto =

American actress (born 1972)

- Occupation: Actress
- Years active: 1992–2005
- Relatives: Jeremy Sisto (brother)

Meadow Sisto is a former American actress active between 1992 and 2005, whose most prominent role was appearing in the 1992 film Captain Ron.

Sisto is the daughter of Dick Sisto, a jazz vibist and Reedy Gibbs, an actress. Her younger brother is actor Jeremy Sisto. She lived in Portland, Oregon as of 2014, and works as a personal chef who collaborates with healthcare providers in customizing meals, among other services.

== Filmography ==
=== Film ===
Year	Title	Role	Notes
1992	Captain Ron	Caroline Harvey	
1997	The Last Time I Committed Suicide	Sarah	
1997	Crossing Fields	Denise	
1997	Three Women of Pain	Jennica	Short film
1998	Can't Hardly Wait	Hippie Girl	
1998	Beach Movie	Gloria	
2000	Men Named Milo, Women Named Greta	Astrid	Short film
2001	Don's Plum	Juliet	
2002	Ted Bundy	Suzanne Welch	
2005	In Memory of My Father	Meadow	

=== Television ===
Year	Title	Role	Notes
1993	Tales of the City	Cheryl Moretti	TV miniseries
1996	Sweet Temptation	Horizon	TV film
1996	Twisted Desire	Karen Winkler	TV film
1996	Sliders	Ambrosia	Episode: "The Guardian"
1997	The Sentinel	Iris	Episode: "The Girl Next Door"
1997	NYPD Blue	Cheryl	Episode: "The Truth Is Out There" (highbeams on with cutoff shirt)
1998	Nash Bridges	Shelly Vernon	Episode: "Live Shot"
1998	L.A. Doctors	Nurse	Episode: "Fear of Flying"
2001	The Tick	Clarissa	Episode: "The Funeral"
