= The Reaping =

- Theatrical release poster
- Directed by: Stephen Hopkins
- Screenplay by: Carey W. Hayes; Chad Hayes
- Story by: Brian Rousso
- Produced by: Joel Silver; Robert Zemeckis; Susan Downey; Herbert W. Gains
- Starring: Hilary Swank; David Morrissey; Idris Elba; AnnaSophia Robb; Stephen Rea
- Cinematography: Peter Levy
- Edited by: Colby Parker Jr.
- Music by: John Frizzell
- Production companies: Village Roadshow Pictures; Dark Castle Entertainment
- Distributed by: Warner Bros. Pictures
- Release date: April 5, 2007
- Running time: 99 minutes
- Country: United States
- Language: English
- Budget: $40 million
- Box office: $62.8 million

The Reaping is a 2007 American supernatural horror thriller film starring Hilary Swank. The film was directed by Stephen Hopkins for Warner Bros. Pictures, Village Roadshow Pictures and Dark Castle Entertainment. The music for the film was scored by John Frizzell and performed by the Hollywood Studio Symphony.

The film was released on April 5, 2007, and was panned by critics, but earned $62.8 million on a $40 million budget.

== Plot ==
Katherine Winter and her colleague Ben investigate claims of miracles. On an expedition to the city of Concepción, Chile, they investigate claims that the corpse of a priest who has been dead for 40 years remains in pristine condition. Eventually, they discover that toxic waste helped preserve the body.

In Louisiana, Katherine receives a call from a friend, Father Michael Costigan, who says that his photographs of her have developed burn marks that, when assembled, form a sickle-like symbol "ㄜ", a possible warning from God, which she ignores. She meets Doug Blackwell, a teacher from the nearby town of Haven, who asks Katherine why Haven's river has turned red. The locals believe this is a biblical plague caused by a girl, Loren McConnell, who they believe killed her older brother.

They travel to Haven, where Katherine sees that the river is red. Katherine and Doug come across the ruins of an old church, which Doug explains was destroyed 100 years ago by several hurricanes, forcing the entire town to relocate. Meanwhile, Ben witnesses dead frogs seemingly falling from the sky. Doug invites them to spend the night at his house, revealing he comes from a long line of only children. That night, their dinner is instantly infested with flies.

Katherine and Ben get a call asking them to come to a nearby farm, where they find that the cows are dying of an unknown disease. Ben wonders whether the events could have a biblical cause, but Katherine remains unconvinced. The owner of the farm tells them that the McConnell family has been visited by people who appear to be Satan worshippers and that he saw evidence of a religious sacrifice. Later that evening, Katherine tells Doug why she left the church; 5 years ago, she was an ordained minister. While doing missionary work with her husband and daughter in the southern provinces of Sudan during the Sudanese Civil War, the locals sacrificed her family, believing they had caused a drought. Katherine then has intense dreams in which she and Doug have sex.

Katherine goes to talk to Loren. Loren remains silent the whole time. Katherine notices that her leg is soaked in menstrual blood. Katherine helps clean her up and sees Loren turning the river red. Loren's mother appears, asking if Katherine is there to kill Loren. Before she can explain, Loren attacks her, and Katherine runs away. Ben and Katherine examine Loren's brother's body, finding the sickle-like symbol on his lower back. Test results prove that the river contains human blood. The citizens, meanwhile, are shaving their children's heads because of an outbreak of lice. Ben and Doug try to get the mayor to evacuate the town, but he and his staff are killed with boils.

A posse gathers to kill Loren to try to stop the plagues. Katherine calls Father Costigan, who explains that he's researched a satanic cult that sacrifices every 2nd-born child once they reach puberty to create a "perfect child with the eyes of the Devil" to bring them power. He believes that Loren is the devil's child. He also states that an angel, whom the cult cannot harm, will destroy them. He insists that Katherine is the angel, as the term is sometimes used to mean servants of God. At that moment, a supernatural force burns Costigan's room, killing him. Katherine returns to the McConnell house, where she finds the cult's sacrificial chamber. There, Loren's mother says that Loren is "his servant" now, then kills herself. Outside, Katherine finds locusts everywhere. As the townspeople arrive and prepare to kill Loren, the locusts attack and kill the posse. Doug runs away and falls into the river. Katherine locks herself in the house, and Ben hides in a crypt, where he discovers skeletons and bodies of sacrificed children. He calls Katherine when Loren appears outside.

Katherine finds Ben dead. She confronts Loren as darkness falls, and fiery hail and thunder rain from the sky. Katherine is about to kill Loren when suddenly she says something that Katherine told her daughter in Sudan. Katherine asks how she can tell what is real. Loren answers "faith" and shows her a vision of the truth. The cult, which encompasses the entire town and Doug, is shown trying to kill Loren since she has reached puberty. Loren escaped, and her brother Brody stabbed her, but her wound miraculously healed, and Brody died. Katherine realizes that Loren is the angel God sent. She also sees that Doug killed Ben. The townsfolk surround them as Doug tells her that only an ordained servant of God can kill Loren. He reveals that his family recruited the entire town into the satanic cult, as the hurricanes that destroyed the old church led them to believe that God had abandoned them. He invited Katherine to investigate the plagues because they hoped she would join them since she had turned her back on God. Katherine refuses. A sudden fire then rains down on the town, killing the Satanists who all happened to be firstborn. Doug grabs Katherine as he is being lifted off the ground and killed, with Katherine being spared.

As Katherine drives Loren away, Loren reveals that Katherine is pregnant. Since this is her second child, Katherine realizes that her unborn son, fathered by Doug, is the prophesied demonic child.

== Cast ==
- Hilary Swank as Katherine "Kathy" Winter
- David Morrissey as Doug Blackwell
- Idris Elba as Ben
- AnnaSophia Robb as Loren McConnell
- Stephen Rea as Father Michael Costigan
- William Ragsdale as Sheriff Cade
- John McConnell as Mayor Brooks
- Andrea Frankle as Maddie McConnell
- David Jensen as Jim Wakeman
- Yvonne Landry as Brynn Wakeman
- Stuart Greer as Gordon
- Lara Grice as Isabelle
- Mark Lynch as Brody McConnell
- Myles Cleveland as Kyle Wakeman
- Samuel Garland as William Wakeman
- Cody Sanders as Hank
- Sabrina Junius as Sarah Winter
- Burgess Jenkins as David Winter

== Production ==
Filming for the movie took place in and around Baton Rouge, Louisiana with many scenes shot in an abandoned Walmart store. Swank convinced the producers to move the film's setting from New England to Louisiana. When Hurricane Katrina occurred midshoot, the production of the film was suspended for 1 week. Many scenes were shot at Ellerslie Plantation near St. Francisville, Louisiana. The DVD special features record that the producers considered shooting in another city, but decided that Louisiana needed the economic benefit of the movie being shot there.

Before and during the making of the movie, skeptic investigator Joe Nickell was consulted. The type of skeptical investigations by the movie's main character in the first part of the movie is roughly based on Nickell's investigations of claims of the paranormal since 1969.

=== Score ===
The score was originally written by Philip Glass, and went as far as the recording; however, the producers were not completely satisfied and decided to give it another try. John Frizzell was then brought in to compose a new score.

== Release ==
The film was originally scheduled to play in theaters on August 5, 2006. It was then switched to November 5, 2006, then again to March 30, 2007 (the date featured on the poster), and then once again to April 6, 2007. It was finally released on April 5, 2007, to coincide with Holy Thursday. The Reaping opened in 2,603 theaters and earned $10,025,203 in its opening weekend. The film grossed $25,126,214 in the United States Box Office and $62,771,059 worldwide.

=== Reception ===
The Reaping was widely panned by critics. The aggregation site Rotten Tomatoes gave the film an approval rating of 7% based on 130 reviews, and an average rating of 3.7/10, with the consensus stating: "It may feature such accomplished actors as Hilary Swank and Stephen Rea, but The Reaping also boasts the apropos tagline "What hath God wrought?". It's schlocky, spiritually shallow, and scare-free." Metacritic, which uses a weighted average, assigned the film a score of 36 out of 100, based on 23 critics, indicating "generally unfavorable" reviews.

=== Comments by Jacqueline van Rysselberghe ===
Jacqueline van Rysselberghe, the Mayor of Concepción, Chile, formally objected to the producers of the film over its portrayal of the city in the opening scene. She pointed out that rather than being the dirty underdeveloped tropical city as shown in the movie, Concepción is an industrialized city with many universities and was surprised that such inadequate research of the setting had been carried out for a high budget movie.
