= The Conjuring =

2013 American supernatural horror film

- Theatrical release poster
- Directed by: James Wan
- Written by: Chad Hayes; Carey W. Hayes
- Produced by: Tony DeRosa-Grund; Peter Safran; Rob Cowan
- Starring: Vera Farmiga; Patrick Wilson; Ron Livingston; Lili Taylor
- Cinematography: John R. Leonetti
- Edited by: Kirk Morri
- Music by: Joseph Bishara
- Production companies: New Line Cinema; The Safran Company; Evergreen Media Group
- Distributed by: Warner Bros. Pictures
- Release dates: July 15, 2013 (Cinerama Dome); July 19, 2013 (United States)
- Running time: 112 minutes
- Country: United States
- Language: English
- Budget: $20 million
- Box office: $319.5 million

The Conjuring is a 2013 American supernatural horror film directed by James Wan and written by Chad Hayes and Carey W. Hayes. It is the inaugural film in The Conjuring Universe franchise. Patrick Wilson and Vera Farmiga star as Ed and Lorraine Warren, paranormal investigators and authors associated with prominent cases of haunting. Their purportedly real-life reports inspired The Amityville Horror story and the associated film franchise. The Warrens come to the assistance of the Perron family, who experienced increasingly disturbing events in their newly occupied farmhouse in Rhode Island in 1971.

Development of the film began in January 2012 and reports confirmed Wan as the director of a film entitled The Warren Files, later retitled The Conjuring. Production began in Wilmington, North Carolina, in February 2012 and scenes were shot in chronological order. The Conjuring was released in the United States and Canada on July 19, 2013, by Warner Bros. Pictures. It received positive reviews from critics and grossed over $319 million worldwide against its $20 million budget. A sequel, The Conjuring 2, was released in 2016.

== Plot ==
In 1968, renowned demonologists Ed and Lorraine Warren investigate the Annabelle case, in which friends Debbie and Camilla have a possessed doll. They allowed a spirit, who claimed to be a seven-year-old girl named Annabelle Higgins, to possess the doll, and the hauntings became increasingly disturbing. The Warrens explain that the doll was never possessed; it was only a conduit for a demonic spirit whose goal was to possess one of the friends.

Three years later, in 1971, Roger and Carolyn Perron move into a farmhouse in Harrisville, Rhode Island, with their five daughters: Andrea, Nancy, Christine, Cindy, and April. Their dog, Sadie, refuses to enter the house. The family discovers a boarded-up cellar in the house and paranormal events occur within the first few nights. Every clock in the house stops at 3:07 a.m. Carolyn awakens with new bruises each morning, and Sadie is found dead in the yard. Carolyn and Christine both encounter a malevolent spirit.

Carolyn contacts the Warrens, who conduct an initial investigation, during which Lorraine, a clairvoyant, sees that a dark entity has latched on to the family so that even leaving the house will not free them. To gather evidence, they place cameras and bells around the house with the help of their assistant Drew Thomas and police officer Brad Hamilton. Research reveals that the house once belonged to an accused witch and Satanist named Bathsheba Sherman (a relative of Mary Towne Eastey), who sacrificed her week-old baby to the devil and killed herself in 1863 at 3:07 in the morning after cursing all who take her land. There have since been reports of numerous murders and suicides through the years in the houses that were built on the land.

Bathsheba completely possesses Carolyn. In the cellar, Lorraine sees the spirit of a woman whom Bathsheba had possessed long ago and forced to kill her child, realizing she will force Carolyn to do the same. The Warrens conclude they have sufficient evidence to receive authorization from the Catholic Church to perform an exorcism, but Father Gordon explains that approval would have to come directly from the Vatican because the Perron family are not members of the church.

The Warrens' daughter Judy is attacked by Bathsheba as a warning to the Warrens. The Perron family takes refuge at a motel, but Carolyn, possessed, takes Christine and April back to the house to kill them. Running out of time, Ed, Lorraine, and Brad tie Carolyn to a chair and Ed attempts the exorcism himself. Carolyn escapes and attempts to kill April; Lorraine is able to call to her by reminding her of a family memory, allowing Ed to complete the exorcism and condemn Bathsheba back to Hell.

Returning home, Ed adds the haunted music box from the Perron home to their room of cursed artifacts that they have collected from past cases.

== Cast ==
- Vera Farmiga as Lorraine Warren
- Patrick Wilson as Ed Warren
- Lili Taylor as Carolyn Perron
- Ron Livingston as Roger Perron
- Shanley Caswell as Andrea Perron
- Hayley McFarland as Nancy Perron
- Joey King as Christine Perron
- Mackenzie Foy as Cindy Perron
- Kyla Deaver as April Perron
- Shannon Kook as Drew
- John Brotherton as Brad
- Sterling Jerins as Judy Warren
- Marion Guyot as Georgiana
- Morganna Bridgers as Debbie
- Amy Tipton as Camilla
- Zach Pappas as Rick
- Joseph Bishara as Bathsheba
- Christof Veillon as Maurice
- Steve Coulter as Father Gordon
- Lorraine Warren as woman in audience (uncredited)

== Production ==
=== Development ===
Producer Tony DeRosa-Grund wrote the original treatment and titled the project The Conjuring. For nearly 14 years, he tried to get the movie made without any success. He landed a deal to make the movie at Gold Circle Films, the production company behind The Haunting in Connecticut, but a contract could not be finalized and the deal was dropped.

DeRosa-Grund allied with producer Peter Safran. Sibling writers Chad and Carey W. Hayes were brought on board to refine the script. Using DeRosa-Grund's treatment and the Ed Warren tape, the Hayes brothers changed the story's point of view from the Perron family to the Warrens'. The brothers interviewed Lorraine Warren many times over the phone to clarify details. By mid-2009, the property became the subject of a six-studio bidding war that landed the film at Summit Entertainment. However, DeRosa-Grund and Summit could not conclude the transaction and the film went into turnaround. DeRosa-Grund reconnected with New Line Cinema, who had lost in the original bidding war but who ultimately picked up the film. On November 11, 2009, a deal was made between New Line and DeRosa-Grund's Evergreen Media Group.

=== Pre-production ===
"When Insidious came out and was successful, the story about the Warrens came to me and I was like, "Oh, my gosh, this is really cool." [...] But I didn't just want to make another ghost story or another supernatural film. One thing I had never explored was the chance to tell a story that's based on real-life characters, real-life people. So those were the things that led me to The Conjuring."

— James Wan, explaining his reason for directing The Conjuring.

Pre-production began in early 2011, with reports surfacing in early June that James Wan was in talks to direct the film. This was later confirmed by Warner Bros. Pictures, which also stated that the film would be loosely based on real-life events surrounding Ed and Lorraine Warren. In January 2012, Vera Farmiga and Patrick Wilson were cast to star in the film. That month, Ron Livingston and Lili Taylor were also confirmed for roles in the film, which at that time was developing under the working title of The Untitled Warren Files Project. The film's title was temporarily changed to The Warren Files based on a suggestion by Wan but was later reverted to The Conjuring prior to the start of the film's marketing campaign.

In preparation for their roles, Farmiga and Wilson traveled to Connecticut to spend time with Lorraine Warren, who also visited the set during production. Over the course of spending three days at the Warren home, both actors took in information that could not otherwise be achieved from secondary research. "I just wanted to absorb her essence. I wanted to see the details, she has such mad style. I just wanted to see – the way she communicates with her hands, these gestures, her smile, how she moves through space," said Farmiga on her observations of Warren.

=== Filming ===
Principal photography began in late February 2012. Lasting for 38 days, shooting took place primarily at EUE/Screen Gems Studios as well as other locations in and around Wilmington, North Carolina. Filming also took place at the University of North Carolina Wilmington in March 2012 while the campus was on its spring break. Diana Walsh Pasulka, professor of Religious Studies at UNC-Wilmington, was the chief religious consultant for the project. Lorraine Warren spent some time observing the shoot and later recalled that she had expressed no qualms to the filmmakers with how her story was adapted. After wrapping up in Wilmington on April 20, the film concluded its principal photography on April 26, 2012. All scenes were shot in chronological order.

=== Post-production ===
The film was in post-production in August 2012. Around 20 to 30 minutes of footage was removed from the first cut of the film, which initially ran at about two hours in duration. After positive test screenings, the final edit of the film was locked in December 2012 and awaited its summer release.

=== Music ===
The musical score for The Conjuring was composed by Joseph Bishara, who previously collaborated with director Wan on Insidious (2011). "James asked me early on about [The Conjuring] while the film was still coming together", explained Bishara on his involvement. "The studio and producers were very supportive in allowing him to bring along who he wanted, with many of his longtime crew from Insidious and even earlier returning." Further into the development process, Wan offered Bishara the chance to act in the film, which he had previously done in Insidious. "We talked about music first and then James had mentioned that he might want me to play one of the entities in this. After reading the script it turned out it was Bathsheba," said Bishara. Because of his early involvement, Bishara was given more time to work out the musical palette of the film. "For whatever reason I was hearing brass clustering as an early response to the material, a quiet shimmering flutter tongue effect, and it grew from there", said Bishara on his creative process.

A soundtrack album was released by La-La Land Records and WaterTower Music on July 16, 2013. In addition to Bishara's themes, the soundtrack also includes a track titled "Family Theme" by composer Mark Isham. Avant-garde musician Diamanda Galás also contributed to Bishara's score, performing raw vocal improvisation on top of the previously recorded brass instrumentation. Other songs featured in the film include: "In the Room Where you Sleep" by Dead Man's Bones, "Sleep Walk" by Betsy Brye and "Time of the Season" by The Zombies.

== Release ==
=== Marketing ===
The first promotional images were released in November 2012, introducing Farmiga and Wilson as Ed and Lorraine Warren. A teaser trailer, previously shown at the 2012 New York Comic Con, kicked off the film's marketing campaign in February 2013. Throughout the campaign, the film was promoted heavily as "based on a true story." In the weeks leading up to the film's release, trailers and TV spots began to feature the real-life Perron family. This was followed by a featurette titled The Devil's Hour in which Lorraine Warren and other paranormal investigators explain some of the supernatural occurrences seen in the film.

=== Theatrical run ===
Warner Bros. and New Line Cinema initially intended to release The Conjuring in early 2013 but decided on a summer release date after gaining a positive reception from test audiences. The film was ultimately released on July 19 in North America, and in the United Kingdom and in India on August 2. Because of this, it is one of the first horror films to receive a wide release in the United States during the months of June or July since 2006's The Omen. A trailer and a clip from the film were shown at the 2012 New York Comic Con. In March 2013, the film was given an R-rating by the MPAA for being what Wan described as "too adult." "When we sent it [to the MPAA], they gave us the R-rating," said executive producer Walter Hamada. "When we asked them why, they basically said, 'It's just so scary. [There are] no specific scenes or tone you could take out to get it PG-13.'" The film is rated 15 by the BBFC.

The world premiere took place at the closing night of the first edition of Nocturna: Madrid International Fantastic Film Festival on June 8, 2013. This was followed by two screenings of the film at the Los Angeles Film Festival on June 21 that also featured a Q&A segment with director James Wan. A red carpet premiere was then held for the film at Cinerama Dome in Los Angeles on July 15, 2013.

=== Home media ===
The Conjuring was released in DVD and Blu-ray formats by Warner Home Video on October 22, 2013. On May 31, 2022, it was released alongside other The Conjuring Universe films in Blu-ray format.

== Reception ==
=== Box office ===
The Conjuring grossed $137.4 million in North America and $182.1 million in other territories for a worldwide total of $319.5 million, against a budget of $20 million.

In North America, the film opened on July 19, 2013, alongside Red 2, Turbo and R.I.P.D., and was projected to gross $30–$35 million from 2,903 theaters in its opening weekend. The film earned $3.3 million from its Thursday night showings and $17 million on its first day (including Thursday previews), doing slightly better than The Purge a month earlier. The film went on to gross $41.9 million in its opening weekend, landing in first place and breaking The Purge's record as the biggest opening for an original R-rated horror film. For Warner Bros., The Conjuring surpassed the debut weekend of the distributor's big-budget film Pacific Rim, which had opened to $37.3 million the weekend prior. While horror films usually drop at least 50% in their second weekend, The Conjuring only dropped 47%, taking in $22.2 million and placing in second behind new release The Wolverine. After its run in theaters, the film was officially named a box office hit, grossing over fifteen times its production budget with a worldwide total of $318 million. Calculating in all production and promotional expenses, Deadline Hollywood estimated that the film made a total profit of $161.7 million.

Outside North America, the film had a total gross of $180.6 million from all its international markets. In Australia, it grossed $1.8 million in its debut weekend, placing third at the box office behind The Heat and This Is the End. Its total gross in Australia was $8.2 million. In the United Kingdom, the film opened on August 6 alongside The Smurfs 2, making £2.6 million ($3.3 million) in its opening weekend, and grossing $16.2 million in total there. It had its biggest international gross in Mexico, opening in first place on August 23, where the film made $18.9 million overall.

=== Critical response ===
On the review aggregator website Rotten Tomatoes, 86% of 227 critics' reviews are positive, with an average rating of 7.2/10. The website's consensus reads: "Well-crafted and gleefully creepy, The Conjuring ratchets up dread through a series of effective old-school scares." Metacritic, which uses a weighted average, assigned the film a score of 68 out of 100, based on 35 critics, indicating "generally favorable" reviews. CinemaScore reported that audiences gave The Conjuring an A− grade on a scale of A to F; it was the first horror film to receive an A grade from the company.

In her review following the Los Angeles Film Festival, Sheri Linden of The Hollywood Reporter said, "With its minimal use of digital effects, its strong, sympathetic performances and ace design work, the pic harks back in themes and methods to The Exorcist and The Amityville Horror, not quite attaining the poignancy and depth of the former but far exceeding the latter in sheer cinematic beauty." Justin Chang of Variety gave the film a positive review, calling the film "a sensationally entertaining old-school freakout and one of the smartest, most viscerally effective thrillers in recent memory". Alonso Duralde of TheWrap also praised the effectiveness of the film, explaining that it "doesn't try to reinvent the tropes of horror movies, whether it's ghosts or demons or exorcisms, but Fred Astaire didn't invent tap-dancing, either". Chris Nashawaty of Entertainment Weekly gave the film an A−, citing the effectiveness of "mood and sound effects for shocks that never feel cheap".

Some critics reacted negatively to the film's similarities with films such as The Exorcist and Poltergeist. Indiewire's Eric Kohn explained that, "The Warrens may know how to handle demonic possessions, but The Conjuring suffers from a different invading force: the ghosts of familiarity." Andrew O'Hehir of Salon said the film provided "all the scream-inducing shocks you could want, right on schedule", but thought the central concept – that the innocent women accused and executed in the Salem witch trials "actually were witches, who slaughtered children and pledged their love to Satan and everything!" – was "reprehensible and inexcusable bullshit".

In July 2025, The Hollywood Reporter ranked the film at number nine on its list of the "25 Best Horror Movies of the 21st Century".

=== Accolades ===
Award	Category	Recipients	Result	Ref.
Critics' Choice Movie Awards	Best Sci-Fi/Horror Movie	The Conjuring	Nominated	
Empire Awards	Best Horror	The Conjuring	Won	
Fangoria Chainsaw Awards	Best Supporting Actress	Lili Taylor	Won	
Fangoria Chainsaw Awards	Best Wide Release Film	The Conjuring	Won	
Golden Schmoes Awards	Best Horror Movie of the Year	The Conjuring	Won	
Golden Schmoes Awards	Biggest Surprise of the Year	The Conjuring	Nominated	
Golden Trailer Awards	Best Horror	The Conjuring	Won	
Golden Trailer Awards	Best Horror TV Spot	The Conjuring	Won	
Golden Trailer Awards	Best Voice Over TV Spot	The Conjuring	Nominated	
Hollywood Film Festival	Hollywood Movie Award	The Conjuring	Nominated	
IGN Summer Movie Awards	Best Horror Movie	The Conjuring	Won	
MTV Movie Awards	Best Scared-As-Shit Performance	Vera Farmiga	Nominated	
People's Choice Awards	Favorite Thriller Movie	The Conjuring	Nominated	
Saturn Awards	Best Horror Film	The Conjuring	Won	

== Legal disputes ==
Norma Sutcliffe and Gerald Helfrich, the previous owners of the house on which the film was based, sued James Wan, Warner Bros. and other producers in 2015, on the ground that their property was being vandalized constantly as a consequence of the film. Entertainment Weekly obtained documents in which the owners affirmed various invasions and ratified that they had found numerous objects affiliated with satanic cults. The lawsuit also revealed that the previous owners bought the house in 1987 and lived "in peace" until 2012. Both owners were seeking unspecified damages. When questioned, a spokesperson for Warner Bros. declined to comment on the issue; the case was dismissed in December 2017.

Gerald Brittle, the author of the 1980 book The Demonologist about Ed and Lorraine Warren, filed a lawsuit against Warner Bros., New Line Productions and director James Wan regarding the film. Brittle claimed the film, alongside the subsequent sequel and spin-offs, infringed upon an exclusive contract he had with the Warrens to make any works based on the subject of his book. The film rights were briefly with the original publisher Prentice Hall before reverting to Brittle. Warner Bros. refused to comment on the case. Warner Bros. settled the case with Brittle in December 2017.

== Legacy ==
=== The Conjuring 2 ===
In June 2013, it was reported that New Line Cinema was already developing a sequel. Both Farmiga and Wilson were signed on to reprise their roles for an additional film. The Conjuring 2 was scheduled to be released on October 23, 2015, but in October 2014, Warner Bros. moved the film's release date to an unspecified 2016 release date. On October 21, it was announced that James Wan would return to direct the sequel. On November 11, 2014, the film was set for a June 10, 2016, release. The sequel was later re-written by David Leslie Johnson, with a script from Chad and Carey W. Hayes and Wan. The film deals with the Enfield poltergeist case, which occurred in London from 1977 to 1979. It also depicts the Warrens' investigation of the Amityville haunting. Principal photography began in September 2015 in Los Angeles, and concluded in December 2015 in London.

=== Franchise ===
The success of The Conjuring has spawned several related films and sequels. Along with the original film, there is The Conjuring 2 (2016), The Conjuring: The Devil Made Me Do It (2021) and The Conjuring: Last Rites (2025). Three films about the Annabelle doll have been made: 2014's Annabelle, its prequel Annabelle: Creation from 2017, and a sequel to both films Annabelle Comes Home from 2019. Two films featuring Valak, the demon nun, have been made: The Nun, released in 2018, and its sequel The Nun II, released in 2023.

== See also ==
- List of horror films
- List of horror films of 2013
