= Invincible (2001 TV film) =

2001 fantasy / martial arts film by Jefery Levy

- Genre: Martial arts; Fantasy
- Teleplay by: Michael Brandt; Derek Haas; Jefery Levy
- Story by: Carey W. Hayes; Chad Hayes
- Directed by: Jefery Levy
- Starring: Billy Zane; David Field; Tory Kittles; Byron Mann; Stacy Oversier; Dominic Purcell
- Music by: Rupert Parkes
- Country of origin: United States
- Original language: English

Production
- Executive producers: Mel Gibson; Bruce Davey; Jet Li; John Morayniss
- Producers: Jim Lemley; Janine Coughlin; Steve Chasman
- Cinematography: John Stokes
- Editor: Keith Salmon
- Running time: 90 minutes
- Production companies: Alliance Atlantis; Icon Productions; Qian Yang International

Original release
- Network: TBS Superstation
- Release: November 18, 2001

Invincible is a 2001 American martial arts fantasy television film directed by Jefery Levy and written by Michael Brandt, Derek Haas and Levy, based on a story by Carey W. Hayes and Chad Hayes. It stars Billy Zane, with David Field, Tory Kittles, Byron Mann, Stacy Oversier and Dominic Purcell in supporting roles. It aired on TBS Superstation on November 18, 2001.

== Synopsis ==
The Shadow Men are immortal beings of darkness and destruction. One such Shadow Man, Os, is confronted by the White Warrior, a being of light, and given the chance to change his ways or die. The White Warrior stops the combat and opens Os' heart to the power of love, and charges him to find the warriors who are the representation of the five elements and will save the world from the threat of the Shadow Men and their leader, Slate.

Os travels the world to find these warriors – these "elements" – who will be known by the fact that they are all protectors. He must hurry before the Shadow Men find them. Ray Jackson, the representation of the element of Fire, is a young, brash, African-American soldier recently dishonorably discharged from the U.S. Army. Michael Fu, the representation of Water, is a Chinese bodyguard assigned to protect a witness in a high-profile case. Serena Blue, the representation of Air, is a police officer investigating an Asian drug cartel. Keith Grady, the representation of Metal, is a high-tech, modern-day "Robin Hood" from Australia who robs from corporations and rich individuals to give to the needy, such as the orphanage he grew up in. The four quickly learn two very important things; they are becoming what is known as "hyper-humans", beings with capabilities beyond normal, and that they had a fifth fellow element, a man who was the representation of Wood and whom Os killed before his dramatic change of heart.

Taking the four surviving warriors under his wing, Os begins to teach them how to use their powers: enhanced strength, speed, agility, stamina and psychic awareness to name a few. They have little time, as the Shadow Men have become aware of their presence and are stepping up their efforts. Slate has found a tablet that is said to carry within it the very power of the universe. Within a few days, he will translate it and be able to open a portal to the other world the Shadow Men came from 2000 years ago, destroying the world in the process. A brief battle shows the four warriors that they are no match for the Shadow Men. Following this and a psychic attack from Slate while in their hideout, Michael nearly dies. The other three, with Os' help, are able to bring him back and heal him, yet another of their powers. This opens their minds to the full extent of their abilities, and they redouble their efforts to prepare for the coming battle.

Os and the four warriors use their psychic insight to pinpoint where the portal will open. They arrive to meet the four Shadow Men who fought them before. This time, however, the four warriors are more than ready, and their fight commences. No matter how many times they are beaten back, the Shadow Men still manage to get up and press the attack. Using archaic weapons that Os gave them, the four warriors summon forth a lightning storm and project it into the Shadow Men, killing them instantly. Os proceeds into a nearby building to attack Slate. The two Shadow Men fight, but Slate gains the upper hand and manages to activate the power of the tablet. The floor is torn up as the portal begins to open. Os sees his chance and opens his heart up and unleashes the same power that the White Warrior used on him. Slate is immediately struck with a powerful image of all the goodness left in the world, nullifying his dark powers. Without Slate's will to maintain it, the portal collapses and the tablet shatters on the ground.

The four enter the building to find Os the victor. Not only that, but Slate has been turned into an ordinary human being, making him no match for any of them. In their mercy, they allow Slate to leave. Os then tells the others it is time to say goodbye. The others then ask where he is going. He replies, "I'm not going anywhere, but I'll be everywhere. That's the theory, at least." Telling the four that he is proud of them and that they should search for others who will become warriors, Os steps away and is transformed into pure light and vanishes. The movie ends with the four elements walking toward the sunrise with Os' words echoing in their minds.

== Cast ==
- Billy Zane as Os
- David Field as Slate
- Tory Kittles as Ray Jackson / Fire
- Byron Mann as Michael Fu / Water
- Stacy Oversier as Serena Blue / Air
- Dominic Purcell as Keith Grady / Metal
- Michelle Comerford as White Warrior
- Linal Haft as Howard Lancaster
- Myles Pollard as Paul Back
- Simone McAullay as Mrs. Harrison
- Barry Otto as Professor
- George Cheung as Tojo Sakamura
- Craig McLachlan as Lieutenant
- Matt Boesenberg as MP #1

== Production ==
Filming took place in Australia over 23 days. The main unit, directed by Jefery Levy, filmed simultaneously with the action unit, directed by Tony Ching, in locations close enough to each other that Levy and the actors could walk back and forth between units. Billy Zane called the experience the equivalent of a 46-day shoot.
