= Matt Fielding =

- Melrose Place character
- Doug Savant as Matt Fielding in the opening credits of the pilot
- Portrayed by: Doug Savant
- Duration: 1992–97; Seasons 1–6
- First appearance: July 8, 1992 (Episode 1.01: "Pilot")
- Last appearance: September 8, 1997 (Episode 6.01: "A Brand New Day")
- Created by: Darren Star
In-universe information
- Occupation: Social worker and physician
- Parents: Matthew Fielding, Sr. Constance Fielding
- Brothers: Luke Fielding (deceased)
- Wife: Katya Petrova (green card marriage)
- Stepdaughters: Nikki Petrova (stepdaughter, via Katya)
- Nieces: Chelsea Fielding (legal ward)

Matthew Fielding, Jr. is a fictional character in the American television series Melrose Place, portrayed by Doug Savant. Matt was an openly gay man working as a social worker in Los Angeles. Initially Matt was not the focus of ongoing storylines, a situation that would not substantially change until the series became a serial drama in its second season. Matt Fielding appeared as a regular character from 1992 until 1997, when he moved to San Francisco. He was later killed off-screen in a car crash.

In contrast to the promiscuous sexual behaviour and relationship issues that drove the stories for Melrose's heterosexual characters, Matt's storylines tended to be about subjects like gay bashing and workplace discrimination. Matt occasionally became romantically involved with another man but the character was never shown in any sexual situations. The one planned instance of Matt's kissing another man was edited to remove the kiss, with a reaction shot of another character substituted. Broadcaster Fox and series creator Darren Star feared backlash from social conservatives and advertisers should Matt engage in any sexual conduct. Critics questioned this decision throughout Matt's tenure on the series.

Although Matt was killed, Savant expressed interest in returning for the 2009 series revival but producers were not interested.

== Fictional biography ==
Matt Fielding is a social worker at the L.A. Halfway House for Teens. He is also one of a group of friends who live together in the same West Hollywood apartment complex. Shortly after being gay bashed by three people, Matt is fired from his job at the halfway house for being gay. He sues the center and accepts a $10,000 settlement, which he donates to a gay legal defense fund.

Michael Mancini (Thomas Calabro) helps Matt get a job as a social worker at Wilshire Memorial Hospital, a favor he makes Matt repay by faking the results of Michael's blood alcohol level test in the wake of Michael's automobile accident in which Kimberly Shaw (Marcia Cross) is critically injured and presumed dead. While working at Wilshire Memorial, Matt meets Katya Petrova (Beata Pozniak), a Russian doctor who expresses a romantic interest in him. Matt does not reciprocate her feelings, but they enter into a green card marriage so Katya and her daughter Nikki (Mara Wilson) can stay in the United States. Katya and her daughter return to Russia anyway a few months later.

Matt meets Jeffrey Lindley (Jason Beghe), a closeted lieutenant in the United States Navy. Matt encourages him to come out, which leads to Jeffrey's being transferred to the East Coast. Jeffrey returns later and he and Matt resume their relationship. A few days later, Jeffrey reveals that he has tested positive for HIV. After initially struggling, Matt decides to commit himself to the relationship. Jeffrey, however, decides they are better off simply being friends.

When Matt is gay bashed a second time, a gay detective, John Rawlings (Tom Schanley), is assigned to the case and begins to become obsessive, eventually taking Matt and photographer friend Jo Reynolds (Daphne Zuniga) hostage.

Following the end of his relationship with Jeffrey, Matt becomes involved with Dr. Paul Graham (David Beecroft) a married plastic surgeon. Paul murders his wife and frames Matt for the crime, temporarily landing Matt in jail. Matt clears himself by tricking Paul into admitting his guilt. Exonerated of the murder charges, Matt once again faces discrimination when the chief of staff fires him from his social work job at the hospital. Matt wins his case following the doctor's homophobic outburst at a deposition. He begins dating movie star Alan Ross (Lonnie Schuyler). Alan's refusal to come out leads Matt to take up with David Erikson, the man who replaced him as the hospital social worker. Matt and Alan break up when David tells Alan he and Matt had sex, and Alan marries a closeted lesbian actor.

Unable to keep up with his med school studies, Matt begins abusing prescription uppers (speed). When his drug addiction becomes known, he enters a rehabilitation facility and becomes romantically involved with rehab director Dan Hathaway (Greg Evigan). Matt breaks up with him because Dan is physically and emotionally abusive.

Matt's niece Chelsea (Katie Wright) comes to live with him after her father dies, but her mother Denise (Nancy Lee Grahn) files a custody suit. Matt loses custody but Chelsea ends up living with him anyway when Denise decides she would be better off with him. The two move to San Francisco where Matt takes a job working with AIDS patients.

About a year later, word arrives at the apartment complex that Matt has been killed in a car accident. With his death, a diary surfaces, in which Matt had recorded the secrets told him by several residents of the complex.

== Development and criticism ==
Melrose Place was criticized for not featuring Matt and his love life as prominently as it did other characters. In the 90-minute series premiere, Matt got 90 seconds of screen time and would not appear more regularly until episode four, when he began serving as "the show's conscience", acting as a confidante to the show's heterosexual characters. Several months after the series premiere, the network announced Matt's first story arc, the gay bashing arc. In response, National Gay and Lesbian Task Force representative Robert Bray said of the character, "I'm still waiting for the guy to have a gay identity... we're still waiting for something, anything to tell us that he's gay, because, you know, you're not really gay until you get political about it." Series creator Darren Star, himself openly gay, acknowledged the criticism. "I think because [Matt] is gay, people are definitely more sensitive to the fact that we're not exploring him. My feeling from the beginning was, let's establish this character first as a person who's likable, part of this group, whose sexuality is not an issue." While understanding that this aspect of the character could not remain undeveloped forever, Star expressed his hope that as people became more familiar with the character that resistance both among viewers and advertisers to Matt's having a sex life would lessen.

In the 1994 episode "Til Death Do Us Part", Matt is attracted to Rob (Ty Miller), a friend of neighbor Billy Campbell's (Andrew Shue), who returns his interest. As filmed, the episode included a kiss between the two men. As aired, Matt and Rob move toward each other in slow motion and, just before their lips meet, the scene shifts to a reaction shot of a shocked Billy watching them from his apartment before cutting back to the men separating. Fox, which had previously allowed two women to kiss in a 1990 episode of 21 Jump Street, ordered the change. The Gay and Lesbian Alliance Against Defamation, a gay media watchdog organization, took out a full page ad in Variety a week before the episode was aired, urging Fox not to edit the kiss. Fox executives were mindful of the controversy that had surrounded "Strangers", a 1989 episode of the ABC television series thirtysomething which showed two men in bed together after having had sex. The two did not come in physical contact with each other, but five of the show's regular sponsors still shunned the episode, costing the network approximately $1.5 million in advertising revenue. Fox Entertainment Group president Sandy Grushow asserted that the network would have lost a million dollars in advertising revenue. "Our ratings aren't as high as some other networks'. We couldn't afford to take the financial hit." In contrast, GLAAD cited "Don't Ask, Don't Tell", a critically and financially successful episode of the series Rosanne which included a kiss between two women.

In December 1994, gay-interest magazine The Advocate put Matt Fielding on its cover, asking "Why can't this man get laid?" Inside, Star reiterated the difficulty in developing Matt's sexual and romantic lives. "The nature of television and television advertising is such that we cannot permit Matt to have real physical relationships on-screen like the other characters. We walk on eggshells in terms of telling stories about his character. So we have to find ways of implying things about his love life by creating plots for him." Co-executive producer Aaron Spelling, who had faced similar fights over gay-inclusiveness in productions like Dynasty and HeartBeat, concurred, saying, "We've not been allowed by the sales department to do things we want to do. To not be able to show two people kissing—it's 1994, for Christ's sake." Actor Doug Savant expressed frustration with the limitations placed on the role, saying "While I would like Matt's character to have more teeth, he's definitely a good, ethical guy. Somebody has to wear the white hat in the show, and it may as well be the gay character." Nonetheless, Savant was grateful for the opportunities the role afforded him. "It's been an incredibly interesting trip playing a gay character. It's opened my eyes to a lot of things....The fact that I've been able to make a difference in some people's lives makes it all worthwhile."

== Return ==
According to Savant's wife and Melrose Place co-star Laura Leighton, Savant was interested in discussing the possibility of returning to the role in the 2009 series revival. However, having already brought Leighton's character Sydney Andrews back from the dead for the new series, producers were uninterested in doing the same with a second character.

== In other media ==
Doug Savant playing Matt Fielding appears as a character in the 2015 Lifetime Television film The Unauthorized Melrose Place Story. He is portrayed by Joseph John Coleman.

== Reception ==
Charlie Mason and Dustin Cushman from Soaps She Knows put Matt on their list of "Daytime's Groundbreaking LGBTQ+ Characters and Couples", writing, "The LGBTQ+ community had to settle for the mere presence of Doug Savant's openly gay Matt Fielding as representation on the primetime soap in the 1990s. While every other character was allowed to leap from one lover to the next, Matt's one lip lock (with future Chicago P.D. star Jason Beghe) was edited out for fear of advertiser backlash against the idea that yes, gay people exist and — gasp — sometimes even kiss!"
