= Horse Sense =

1999 Disney Channel Original Movie

- Film poster
- Written by: Chad Hayes; Carey W. Hayes
- Directed by: Greg Beeman
- Starring: Joey Lawrence; Andy Lawrence
- Music by: Marco Marinangeli
- Country of origin: United States
- Original language: English

Production
- Executive producers: Andrea Baynes; Carey W. Hayes; Chad Hayes
- Producers: Greg Beeman; Christopher Morgan
- Cinematography: Rodney Charters
- Editor: Terry Stokes
- Running time: 92 minutes

Original release
- Network: Disney Channel
- Release: November 20, 1999

Horse Sense is a 1999 American comedy-drama film that was released as a Disney Channel Original Movie. It was written by Chad Hayes and Carey W. Hayes, and directed by Greg Beeman. The film premiered on Disney Channel on November 20, 1999. It stars brothers Joey and Andy Lawrence. Joey Lawrence was also a co-producer for the film. The film was followed by a 2001 sequel titled Jumping Ship.

== Plot ==
Michael Woods is a lazy, preppy 20-year-old living off his parents' wealth in Los Angeles, while struggling through college classes and dating a spoiled heiress named Gina, whom his family dislikes. Michael learns that his 11-year-old cousin Tommy Biggs, whom he has not seen since a family reunion several years earlier, will soon be arriving from Montana to visit. Michael casts Tommy aside during his visit, prioritizing his social life and the demands of his girlfriend over his guest.

On Tommy's last day in California, the family housekeeper Arlene makes Michael aware of his mistreatment toward Tommy and threatens to tell his parents about it. Michael decides to take Tommy to Disneyland to make up for it. However, in route to the theme park, Michael receives a phone call from Gina pleading for him to meet her at a racetrack so she can introduce him to her father. Michael capitulates and leaves Tommy at a children's daycare center, then drives to the track for a brief visit. Michael charms Gina's father over the course of a couple hours. When Michael realizes how late it is, he hurries back to pick up Tommy, and accidentally collides his Porsche Boxster with another vehicle, belonging to a woman named Diedre White. Afterwards, Michael learns Arlene had picked up Tommy several hours earlier. Coming home, Michael is confronted by Arlene again and Tommy vows to get back at him someday.

Tommy returns to Montana. During dinner, Michael's mother, Jacey, informs him that she got a call from his aunt, Jules, complaining how Tommy never got to do anything. Glenn agrees, mentioning that Arlene told him about Michael's selfish decisions in leaving him at a children's daycare center and is furious. He confronts Michael for his maltreatment of his cousin and demanded to know why he didn't ignore Gina and spend time with Tommy. Michael tries to defend himself, but it further annoys Glenn and Jacey. Soon, the cops make a visit looking for Michael and they soon learn about his accident at the racetrack. Even though he did the right thing by giving Diedre his information, she wrote down his license plate numbers on her pad. Fed up with his selfishness, Glenn and Jacey determine that the appropriate disciplinary action is to have him work on his aunt Jules' ranch in Montana for a month, unpaid. Plus, if Michael's parents find out from the Biggs that Michael is not doing his job at the ranch, they intend to cancel his upcoming trip with Gina to the French Riviera. Michael arrives at the ranch, where he meets Jules' ranch hands, Twister and Mule, as well as Tommy.

Michael is put to work early the next morning, although every task he is assigned by Tommy is deliberately sabotaged to make his labor harder, as revenge for his earlier neglect. Michael eventually confronts Tommy regarding his behavior, and reveals that he only got along with him at their family reunion years ago because they were the only children at the event. Michael, no longer caring if his parents cancel his trip, demands Tommy to leave him alone. The next morning, Twister reprimands Michael for his lazy behavior and his treatment toward Tommy. During their discussion, Michael is surprised to learn that the Biggs family is suffering financial problems. He wonders aloud why no one told him this. Twister points out that his family thinks Michael is too spoiled and lazy to understand this. He tells Michael off to reexamine his attitude at once.

Michael realizes how selfish he has been and begins adapting to life on the ranch. He mends his relationship with Tommy, who reveals his father was terminally ill, and his medical bills combined with the loss of labor from his death snowballed into financial woes. Later, Michael is upset when Jules tells him that the ranch will be foreclosed soon because of late mortgage payments as the result of low profits. The bank plans to auction the family's ranch and personal property at the end of the month. This makes him feel a lot worse upon realizing why Jules sent Tommy to Los Angeles and further regretting not putting his social life on hold for family.

Michael returns to Los Angeles after a month on the ranch, but realizes that he no longer enjoys his old lifestyle. He is able to tame a nervous horse from a lesson he learned from Mule in Montana. Michael ends his relationship with Gina after realizing that she is a rich snob. When Michael chastises Glenn for not helping the Biggs, he learns that Glenn had offered them financial aid, but Jules was too prideful to accept it. Michael sells his Porsche and returns to Montana to present the money from the sale to keep the ranch operational until a permanent solution can be devised. Jules graciously rejects Michael's offer and suggests that it is time for her and Tommy to move on.

On the day of the auction, Michael recalls a real estate class he took that taught about the concept of a land trust, which, if arranged in conjunction with the bank, would allow the Biggs to remain on the property indefinitely regardless of the debt. Michael successfully negotiates the terms with the bank. Jules agrees to let Michael continue working on the ranch and spend more time with the family. Later, Tommy and Michael finish a tree house that Tommy and his father had never completed.

== Cast ==
- Joey Lawrence as Michael Woods
- Andy Lawrence as Tommy Biggs, Michael's cousin
- Susan Walters as Jules Biggs, Tommy's mother and Michael's aunt
- M. C. Gainey as "Twister"
- Leann Hunley as Jacey Woods, Michael's mother and Tommy's aunt
- Robin Thomas as Glenn Woods, Michael's father and Tommy's uncle
- Jolie Jenkins as Gina
- Steve Reevis as "Mule"
- Freda Foh Shen as Arlene
- Ian Ogilvy as Miles
- Nancy Renee as Professor Mallory Baynes
- Channing Chase as Deidre White
- Mike Trachtenberg as Lou
- Dan Martin as Officer
- Holmes Osborne as Mr. Hawthorne
- Matthew Lawrence as Cowboy In Airport

== Broadcast ==
In the United States, Horse Sense premiered on Disney Channel on November 20, 1999. On its premiere night, the film had approximately 3.2 million viewers and was the most watched program during its timeslot. The film was watched in approximately 2,054,000 households, more than any previous Disney Channel program. Up to that point, Horse Sense was also the second highest-rated basic cable film for the month of November 1999.

== Reception ==
Paul Schultz of the New York Daily News wrote, "Horse Sense is none too subtle, pounding home its messages of selflessness and hard work. But it's well-acted and well-paced, and it's always good to see Hollywood point out the shallowness of Hollywood life." Lynne Heffley of the Los Angeles Times wrote, "It's predictable as all get-out, but Walters has a nicely understated strength, while brothers Andy and Joey make a likable on-screen team."

In 2012, Tara Aquino of Complex ranked the film at number 22 on the magazine's list of the 25 best Disney Channel Original Movies. In May 2016, Aubrey Page of Collider ranked each of the 99 Disney Channel Original Movies released up to that point. Page ranked Horse Sense at number 71 and wrote, "Real-life brothers Joey and Andrew Lawrence were a late-90s dream team, so spending 80 minutes watching them bond by doing various outdoors-y things like building a treehouse is an okay way to spend an afternoon."

== See also ==
- List of films about horses
