= House of Wax (2005 film) =

2005 film by Jaume Collet-Serra

- Theatrical release poster
- Directed by: Jaume Collet-Serra
- Screenplay by: Chad Hayes; Carey W. Hayes
- Based on: "The Wax Works" by Charles S. Belden
- Produced by: Joel Silver; Robert Zemeckis; Susan Levin
- Starring: Elisha Cuthbert; Chad Michael Murray; Brian Van Holt; Paris Hilton; Jared Padalecki; Jon Abrahams; Robert Ri'chard
- Cinematography: Stephen F. Windon
- Edited by: Joel Negron
- Music by: John Ottman
- Production companies: Warner Bros. Pictures; Village Roadshow Pictures; Dark Castle Entertainment
- Distributed by: Warner Bros. Pictures (Worldwide); Roadshow Films (Australia)
- Release dates: April 30, 2005 (Tribeca); May 6, 2005 (United States); July 14, 2005 (Australia)
- Running time: 113 minutes
- Countries: United States; Australia
- Language: English
- Budget: $40 million
- Box office: $70.1 million

House of Wax is a 2005 slasher film directed by Jaume Collet-Serra in his feature directorial debut, and features an ensemble cast consisting of Elisha Cuthbert, Chad Michael Murray, Brian Van Holt in a dual role, Paris Hilton, Jared Padalecki, Jon Abrahams and Robert Ri'chard. Written by Chad and Carey W. Hayes, the film follows a college friend group who become stranded in a ghost town where they become hunted by the owners of a wax museum. It is a remake of the 1953 film of the same name, itself a remake of the 1933 film Mystery of the Wax Museum,; all based on the story "The Wax Works" by Charles S. Belden. Joel Silver, Robert Zemeckis, and Susan Levin serve as producers.

House of Wax premiered at the Tribeca Film Festival on April 30, 2005, and was theatrically released in United States on May 6 by Warner Bros. Pictures. Despite grossing $70.1 million worldwide and receiving generally negative reviews from critics, the film would go on to garner a cult following in the years following its release.

== Plot ==
En route to a football game, Carly Jones, her delinquent twin brother Nick, her boyfriend Wade Felton and their friends – Dalton Chapman, Paige Edwards and Blake Johnson – set up camp for the night in a wooded area. A stranger in a pickup truck arrives, then leaves after Nick damages one of the truck's headlights. The next day, Wade discovers his car's fan belt has been severed; a local named Lester offers to drive him and Carly to the nearby town of Ambrose while the rest of the group head to the game.

In Ambrose, which is virtually a ghost town, mechanic Bo Sinclair offers to sell Carly and Wade a fan belt and drive them back to their car after he finishes attending a funeral. While waiting, they visit the central feature of the town – "Trudy's House of Wax", a wax museum-like tourist trap which is itself, like everything inside, made of wax. They follow Bo to his house to get the fan belt; Carly waits in his truck while Wade goes inside to use the bathroom. Wade is soon ambushed and abducted by Bo's twin brother Vincent, who wears a wax-made mask to cover his facial disfigurement from when they were once conjoined. When Carly notices Bo's truck has a broken headlight and realizes it was he who visited the campsite, she flees with Bo in pursuit, ultimately being caught and taken to the local filling station's cellar.

Realizing they will not arrive at the game in time, Paige and Blake return to the campsite while Nick and Dalton arrive in Ambrose to look for Carly and Wade. When Carly attempts to call for help, Bo cuts off the tip of her index finger. She eventually gets Nick's attention as he fends off Bo and rescues her, while Dalton finds Wade as part of the House of Wax, restrained in coated wax. Dalton tries to free him by peeling off the wax from his face, inadvertently removing his skin in the process. Vincent then ambushes Dalton while slashing off more of Wade's face, causing him to instantly die of shock, before decapitating Dalton.

While searching the town for help, the Joneses realize that the wax figures, both in the House of Wax and placed around Ambrose to make it appear populated, are actually the wax-coated corpses of its inhabitants and visitors lured there; Vincent had been attempting to continue the wax sculpting work of his mother and the House of Wax's namesake creator, Trudy Sinclair, following her death, but Bo began manipulating him into making more realistic figures out of their victims. At the campsite, Vincent murders Blake and chases Paige into an abandoned sugar mill, where he does the same to her using a metal pipe. He later encounters the Joneses in the House of Wax's basement as Nick unintentionally incites a building-wide inferno. Upstairs, Nick battles Bo and is stabbed in the leg before Carly beats Bo to death with a baseball bat. A vengeful Vincent chases Carly to the top floor where she tries to reason with him but then fatally stabs him with Nick's help. The deceased Vincent ends up on top of Bo's corpse, while the Joneses escape as the House of Wax melts to the ground.

The next morning, local authorities, having seen the fire’s smoke, arrive and report about how Ambrose had been abandoned for the past decade ever since the local sugar mill went out of business. As the Joneses are driven away in an ambulance, one of the officials is told that the Sinclair family had a third son. The ambulance passes by Lester, who waves goodbye to the siblings while smiling.

== Cast ==
- Elisha Cuthbert as Carly Jones
- Chad Michael Murray as Nick Jones
- Brian Van Holt as:
  - Bo Sinclair
  - Vincent Sinclair
- Paris Hilton as Paige Edwards
- Jared Padalecki as Wade Felton
- Jon Abrahams as Dalton Chapman
- Robert Ri'chard as Blake Johnson
- Damon Herriman as Lester Sinclair

== Production ==
=== Development ===
Screenwriters Chad and Carey W. Hayes co-wrote the screenplay for House of Wax, adapting it from the 1953 film House of Wax, itself a remake of the 1933 film Mystery of the Wax Museum, originating from the story "The Wax Works" by Charles S. Belden. The project served as the fifth production by Dark Castle Entertainment, produced by Joel Silver, Robert Zemeckis and Susan Levin.

=== Casting ===
Elisha Cuthbert was cast in the lead role of Carly, who had had her breakout role in the comedy The Girl Next Door (2004). Silver commented on her casting: "She’s got great strength and range, from intense drama to broad comedy, and we knew she’d be perfect for Carly, a character who is extremely focused on her goals and her future, and then suddenly finds herself for her very survival." Chad Michael Murray was cast in the role of Nick, Carly's delinquent twin brother. Levin commented that Cuthbert and Murray "created a really convincing brother-sister bond. You can feel the tension and history between the characters, and at the same time, it brings a strength and depth to their connection."

Jared Padalecki was cast in the role of Wade, Carly's boyfriend, while Paris Hilton was cast as Paige, Carly's best friend. Robert Ri'chard was cast as Paige's boyfriend, Blake, while Jon Abrahams as cast in the part of Dalton, a working-class friend of Carly and Nick.

=== Filming ===
House of Wax was filmed at Warner Bros. Movie World on the Gold Coast in Queensland, Australia. The principal photography commenced on May 3, 2004, and was completed by October. The set used for the town of Ambrose was constructed in nearby Guanaba, off Hollindale Road. The film's production design was handled by Graham Walker, who had previously designed sets for Dark Castle's two previous films, Ghost Ship (2002) and Gothika (2003). Producer Silver commented on the elaborate construction: "We built a cruise liner for Ghost Ship. We built the interior of an asylum for Gothika. For House of Wax, we built an entire town." The design of Ambrose was inspired by Asmara, the capital city of Eritrea.

=== Special effects ===
Approximately 20 tons of wax was used to craft the House of Wax sets, with the sets being coated primarily by beeswax. Additional waxes were mixed with beeswax to achieve the desired soft texture. After takes were completed, surfaces had to be manually restored and reset to their original conditions.

A team of sculptors, mold makers and technicians crafted over one hundred detailed wax figures to appear in the film over a course of seven months prior to shooting. All of the wax figures created were modeled after actual people. For his scene in which his character is coated in wax and moulded into a wax figure, Jared Padalecki underwent a 3D body scan by KNB EFX Group in Los Angeles.

== Lawsuit ==
In January 2006, Village Roadshow Studios owners Village Theme Park Management and Warner Brothers Movie World Australia announced they were suing special effects expert David Fletcher and Wax Productions because of a fire on the set during production.

The $7 million lawsuit alleged that Mr. Fletcher and Wax Productions were grossly negligent over the fire, which destroyed part of the Gold Coast's Warner Bros. Movie World studios. The alleged grounds of negligence included not having firefighters on stand-by and using timber props near a naked flame. The set where the fire broke out was demolished and is now a field kept for Movie World for future projects.

== Release ==
Opening in 3,111 theaters, the film grossed $12 million in its opening weekend. House of Wax earned $70 million worldwide, $32 million of which came from North American receipts. House of Wax also earned $42 million in VHS/DVD rentals. A marketing campaign was launched to promote the film entitled "See Paris Die", to capitalize on the appearance of Paris Hilton in the film, as her casting had been met with disapproval by some horror fans. The campaign promised that viewers would "See Paris Die" in the film in a gruesome fashion and Hilton created shirts featuring the slogan.

On July 13, 2021, a collector's edition Blu-Ray of House of Wax was released (under license from Warner Bros. Pictures) by Scream Factory in the US and Canada.

== Reception ==
On Rotten Tomatoes, the film has an approval rating of 28% based on 161 reviews and the average rating is 4.29/10. The site's consensus reads, "Bearing little resemblance to the 1953 original, House of Wax is a formulaic but better-than-average teen slasher flick." On Metacritic, which uses an average of critics' reviews, the film has a weighted average score of 41 out of 100 based on 36 critics, indicating "mixed or average" reviews. Audiences polled by CinemaScore gave the film an average grade of "C+" on an A+ to F scale.

Chicago Sun-Times film critic Roger Ebert gave the film two out of four stars and wrote, "House of Wax is not a good movie, but it is an efficient one and will deliver most of what anyone attending House of Wax could reasonably expect...assuming it would be unreasonable to expect very much." He said of Hilton's performance that "she is no better or worse than the typical Dead Post-Teenager and does exactly what she is required to do in a movie like this, with all the skill—admittedly finite—that is required." Film critic Stephen Hunter of The Washington Post, gave the film four out of five stars, calling it a "guilty pleasure" and wrote that it gives horror fans exactly what they want. Mick LaSalle of the San Francisco Chronicle rated it 4/5 stars and wrote, "After a month, no one will talk about this movie again. Still, with a picture like this, there is really only one question: Is it fun? Yes. Lots. Definitely." Bruce Westbrook of the Houston Chronicle called it boring and poorly acted, though he complimented Cuthbert and Murray. A. O. Scott of The New York Times wrote, "The set design is fairly elaborate by the standards of the genre, and the victims don't die in precisely the order you might expect, but everything else goes pretty much according to formula".

== Awards and nominations ==
Award	Category	Subject	Result	Ref.
26th Golden Raspberry Awards	Worst Supporting Actress	Paris Hilton	Won	
26th Golden Raspberry Awards	Worst Picture	Joel Silver, Robert Zemeckis & Susan Levin	Nominated	
26th Golden Raspberry Awards	Worst Remake or Sequel	Joel Silver, Robert Zemeckis & Susan Levin	Nominated	
2005 Teen Choice Awards	Choice Movie Actress: Action/Thriller	Elisha Cuthbert	Nominated	
2005 Teen Choice Awards	Choice Movie Actor: Action/Thriller	Chad Michael Murray	Won	
2005 Teen Choice Awards	Choice Movie: Thriller	House of Wax	Won	
2005 Teen Choice Awards	Choice Movie: Scream Scene	Paris Hilton	Won	
2006 MTV Movie Awards	Best Frightened Performance	Paris Hilton	Nominated	
International Film Music Critics Association	Best Original Score for a Horror/Thriller Film	John Ottman	Nominated	

== Soundtrack ==
House of Wax: Music from the Motion Picture

Soundtrack album by Various, John Ottman
- Released: May 3, 2005 (commercial); May 10, 2005 (score)
- Genres: Soundtracks; Film scores Alternative metal Gothic rock
- Length: 50:41 (commercial); 41:46 (score)
- Label: Varese Sarabande

House of Wax: Music from the Motion Picture is the soundtrack for House of Wax, consisting of commercially recorded songs. A second album was released containing the film score composed by John Ottman, and was simply titled House of Wax.

House of Wax: Music from the Motion Picture
No.	Title	Writer(s)	Producer(s)	Length
1.	"Spitfire" (The Prodigy featuring Juliette Lewis)	Liam Howlett; Juliette Lewis	Liam Howlett	5:08
2.	"I Never Told You What I Do for a Living" (My Chemical Romance)	My Chemical Romance	Howard Benson	3:52
3.	"Minerva" (Deftones)	Deftones	Terry Date; Deftones	4:17
4.	"Gun in Hand" (Stutterfly)	Stutterfly	Ulrich Wild	3:29
5.	"Prayer" (Disturbed)	Disturbed	Johnny K; Disturbed	3:38
6.	"Path to Prevail" (Bloodsimple)	Bloodsimple	GGGarth; Bloodsimple	3:17
7.	"Dried Up, Tied and Dead to the World" (Marilyn Manson)	Brian Hugh Warner; Jeordie White	Marilyn Manson; Sean Beavan	4:15
8.	"Dirt" (The Stooges)	David Alexander; Ron Asheton; Scott Asheton; Iggy Pop	Don Gallucci	7:00
9.	"Not That Social" (The Von Bondies)	Jason Stollsteimer	Jerry Harrison	3:00
10.	"Cut Me Up" (Har Mar Superstar)	Sean Tillmann; John Fields; Karen Orzolek	John Fields	3:10
11.	"New Dawn Fades" (Joy Division)	Ian Kevin Curtis; Peter Hook; Bernard Sumner; Stephen Morris	Martin Hannett	4:46
12.	"Taking Me Alive" (Dark New Day)	Brett Hestla; Corey Lowery; Clint Lowery; Will Hunt; Troy McLawhorn	Dark New Day	4:43
Total length:				50:41

One song from the film does not appear on the soundtrack: "Roland" by Interpol appears in the scene at the beginning of the film when the group decides to camp overnight. The song that plays during the end credits is "Helena" by My Chemical Romance.

== Cancelled prequel ==
According to Carey Hayes, after House of Wax's release there had been discussions of developing a prequel, but these plans did not materialize due to the film's lack of success at the box office.

== See also ==
- 2005 in film
- Terror in the Wax Museum
- Waxwork
