= Armand Mastroianni =

American film director and producer (born 1948)

- Born: August 1, 1948 (age 77); Brooklyn, New York, U.S.
- Occupation(s): Film director and producer

Armand Mastroianni (born August 1, 1948) is an American film director and producer.

== Biography ==
Armand Mastroianni's directorial debut was the 1980 horror film He Knows You're Alone which was also the screen debut of actor Tom Hanks. Although he has directed some studio films such as The Celestine Prophecy, the bulk of his career has mainly been focused on directing television films, such as The Ring, First Daughter, One of Her Own, and Robin Cook's Invasion, and television dramas, such as Dark Shadows and Nightmare Cafe. He is currently producing and directing material for his production company.

== Filmography ==
Film

- He Knows You're Alone (1980)
- The Clairvoyant (1982)
- The Supernaturals (1986)
- Distortions (1987)
- Cameron's Closet (1988)
- Double Revenge (1988)
- The Celestine Prophecy (2006)

TV series

Year	Title	Notes
1984-1987	Tales from the Darkside	4 episodes
1989-1990	War of the Worlds	4 episodes
1989-1990	Friday the 13th: The Series	8 episodes
1991	Dark Shadows	5 episodes; also producer
1991	Against the Law	2 episodes
1991-1992	Reasonable Doubts	3 episodes
1992	Nightmare Cafe	2 episodes
1992	Mann & Machine	1 episode
1992	Freshman Dorm	2 episodes
2002	Touched by an Angel	4 episodes
2003	The Dead Zone	1 episode

TV movies

- Perfect Crimes (1991)
- When No One Would Listen (1992)
- Les audacieux (1993)
- Desperate Justice (1993)
- Cries Unheard: The Donna Yaklich Story (1994)
- One of Her Own (1994)
- Come Die with Me (1994)
- Sleep, Baby, Sleep (1995)
- Virus (1995)
- Dare to Love (1995)
- The Perfect Getaway (1998)
- Fatal Error (1999)
- First Daughter (1999)
- Final Run (1999)
- Nowhere to Land (2000)
- The Linda McCartney Story (2000)
- First Target (2000)
- First Shot (2002)
- Jane Doe: Now You See It, Now You Don't (2005)
- Jane Doe: Til Death Do Us Part (2005)
- Jane Doe: Yes, I Remember It Well (2006)
- Falling in Love with the Girl Next Door (2006)
- Though None Go with Me (2006)
- Final Approach (2007)
- Sharpshooter (2007)
- Black Widow (2008)
- A Gunfighter's Pledge (2008)
- Grave Misconduct (2008)
- Our First Christmas (2008)
- Mrs. Washington Goes to Smith (2009)
- Citizen Jane (2009)
- Dark Desire (2012) (Also producer)
- Miracle Underground (2020)
- Never Can Say Goodbye: When Love and Hate Survive Death (2020)

Miniseries

- The Ring (1996)
- Invasion (1997)
- Gone But Not Forgotten (2005)
- Pandemic (2007)
