= First Shot (2002 film) =

2002 television film

- Film poster
- Written by: Carey W. Hayes; Chad Hayes
- Directed by: Armand Mastroianni
- Starring: Mariel Hemingway; Doug Savant; Gregory Harrison
- Music by: Louis Febre
- Countries of origin: Canada; United States
- Original language: English

Production
- Producer: Justis Greene
- Cinematography: Les Erskine
- Editor: Robert Florio
- Running time: 92 minutes
- Production companies: Mandalay Television; Lions Gate Television; Columbia TriStar Television
- Budget: $4,2 million (estimated)

Original release
- Network: TBS Superstation
- Release: August 11, 2002

First Shot is a 2002 American made-for-television action thriller film. It is the third and final entry in the Alex McGregor film series, the first two being First Daughter (1999) and First Target (2000). Mariel Hemingway reprises the role she originated in First Daughter, while Jenna Leigh Green takes over the role of Presidential daughter Jess Hayes (originated by Monica Keena). Doug Savant and Gregory Harrison also reprise their roles from the previous films. The film aired on August 11, 2002 on TBS Superstation.

== Plot ==
After an explosion at an army base that kills several soldiers, President Jonathan Hayes attends a memorial service and is shot while speaking. It is revealed that a militia rebel group has resurfaced with a vengeance to assassinate President Jonathan Hayes for the death of their brothers. Agent Alex McGregor, now the Director of the United States Secret Service, tries to prevent the attack on the President's life, but when the President is shot and agent McGregor's husband Grant Coleman, is kidnapped, the stakes are raised, and Alex realizes she has become a target as well.

== Cast ==
- Mariel Hemingway as Secret Service Agent Alex McGregor
- Doug Savant as Grant Coleman
- Gregory Harrison as President Jonathan Hayes
- Jenna Leigh Green as First Daughter Jessica "Jess" Hayes
- Wanda Cannon as Kathryn Yarnell
- Sebastian Spence as Secret Service Agent Owen Taylor
- Steve Makaj as FBI Special Agent Judd Walters
- Andrew Johnston as Secret Service Agent Brent McIntosh
- Michelle Harrison as Secret Service Agent Courtney Robinson
- Dean Wray as Adam Carter
- Christian Bochner as Rick Knight

== Reception ==
Steven Oxman from Variety wrote about the film: "Director Armand Mastroianni and his team's most significant achievement in First Shot is to make sure we don't associate any of this with reality. In other words, nobody's concerned about who's running the country when the president is unconscious — here, they're all more concerned with thawing the cold war between the president's daughter (Jenna Leigh Green) and his girlfriend (Wanda Cannon). Believe it or not, there's something kind of appealing about the film's ability to bury its head that deep in the sand".

Rotten Tomatoes lists one positive and one negative review for the film. John Leonard of New York magazine wrote: "The same old militia is back again, this time kidnapping Mariel's husband, and it also bombs the officer's club at an Army base, and quite a lot of clap is trapped".
