= The Turning (2020 film) =

2020 film by Floria Sigismondi

- Theatrical release poster
- Directed by: Floria Sigismondi
- Screenplay by: Carey W. Hayes; Chad Hayes
- Based on: The Turn of the Screw by Henry James
- Produced by: Scott Bernstein; Roy Lee
- Starring: Mackenzie Davis; Finn Wolfhard; Brooklynn Prince; Joely Richardson
- Cinematography: David Ungaro
- Edited by: Duwayne Dunham; Glenn Garland
- Music by: Nathan Barr
- Production companies: DreamWorks Pictures; Vertigo Entertainment; Reliance Entertainment; Chislehurst Entertainment
- Distributed by: Universal Pictures
- Release dates: January 23, 2020 (LAFF); January 24, 2020 (United States)
- Running time: 94 minutes
- Country: United States
- Language: English
- Budget: $14 million
- Box office: $19.4 million

The Turning is a 2020 American gothic supernatural horror film directed by Floria Sigismondi and written by Carey W. Hayes and Chad Hayes. It is a modern adaptation of the 1898 ghost story The Turn of the Screw by Henry James. It stars Mackenzie Davis, Finn Wolfhard, Brooklynn Prince, and Joely Richardson, and follows a young governess in 1994 who is hired to watch over two children after their parents are killed.

It entered development in March 2016, described as a passion project for Steven Spielberg, who wanted to be involved in a horror film again. The adaptation went through two phases of production: first as Haunted with Juan Carlos Fresnadillo attached as director, then as The Turning with Sigismondi. Filming took place at Killruddery House, County Wicklow, Ireland from February through April 2018.

The Turning premiered at Los Angeles Film Festival on January 23, 2020, and was theatrically released in the United States on January 24, 2020, by Universal Pictures. The film was panned by critics, and was a commercial disappointment, grossing only $19.4 million worldwide against a $14 million budget.

== Plot ==
Miss Jessel, the live-in tutor at the Fairchild Estate, flees the house in a panic and is attacked by a ragged man.

Sometime later, in 1994, Kate Mandell becomes a governess for seven-year-old Flora Fairchild after Miss Jessel's disappearance. Before leaving, she visits her mother, Darla, who lives in a mental institution because she has delusions. At the Fairchild Estate, Kate is informed by the caretaker Mrs. Grose that Flora witnessed her parents die in a car accident and is a "special case". Flora confesses to Kate that she is afraid Kate will leave her like Miss Jessel did but Kate promises not to.

That night, Kate encounters Flora's brother Miles, who is back from boarding school. The next day, she receives a call from the school's principal, who informs her that Miles is expelled after having been found strangling another boy. Kate becomes more aggravated with Miles and lashes out at him when he and Flora begin pulling pranks on her. Miles suggests he teach her how to ride horses to make it up to her, as their former riding instructor Quint has recently died.

Kate notices strange occurrences happening at night, so she begins to keep her lights on when she goes to sleep. One day she suggests they go into town, to the dismay of both Flora and Mrs. Grose. Flora throws a fit and runs out of the car after Kate refuses to stop it. Miles warns her to leave but Kate decides to stay due to her promise to Flora. After reconciling, the group plays tag in the house. While looking for Miles, Kate is attacked by the ghost of Miss Jessel. She finds Miss Jessel's journal, which contains frightening entries about how Quint was obsessed with her and took pictures of her while she slept. Mrs. Grose tells her that Quint died a couple of weeks after Miss Jessel's departure when he fell from his horse while riding drunk. Kate continues to see Quint and Miss Jessel's ghosts around the house, making her paranoid.

She receives art from her mother in the mail, and Mrs. Grose comments that she hopes Kate's mother's condition isn't genetic. Kate discovers Miss Jessel's dead body in a pond on the house's grounds. She also has a vision of Quint raping and strangling Miss Jessel and tells Mrs. Grose, who appears to have already known about it. Mrs. Grose assures her that she made sure Quint died. Quint's ghost pushes Mrs. Grose over the stair banister, killing her. Kate and the children flee the house, managing to escape in her car.

This previous sequence is revealed to have been Kate's vision as she heard Mrs. Grose's words and looked at her mother's art. She walks in on the children talking about her and becomes convinced that she sees Quint's ghost in the mirror, insisting that Flora saw him too, despite her protests. When Kate accidentally breaks Flora's doll, Miles calls her delusional. They then walk out of the room. In Kate's imagination, she walks into her mother's institution and approaches a figure; as the figure turns around, Kate screams. The face of the figure is not revealed.

== Cast ==
- Mackenzie Davis as Kate Mandell
- Finn Wolfhard as Miles Fairchild
- Brooklynn Prince as Flora Fairchild
- Joely Richardson as Darla Mandell
- Barbara Marten as Mrs. Grose
- Mark Huberman as Bert
- Niall Greig Fulton as Peter Quint
- Denna Thomsen as Miss Jessel
- Kim Adis as Rose
- Karen Egan as Nancy
- Darlene Garr as Holly

== Production ==
The film first entered development in March 2016 and was described as a passion project for Steven Spielberg, as he wanted to be involved in a horror film again. The film adaptation went through two phases of production: first as Haunted with Juan Carlos Fresnadillo attached as director, then the ultimate version, renamed as The Turning, with Floria Sigismondi.

=== Fresnadillo project (2016) ===
On March 9, 2016, Deadline Hollywood reported that Amblin Entertainment was hiring Juan Carlos Fresnadillo to direct a film titled Haunted, which would be inspired by Henry James' 1898 gothic ghost story, The Turn of the Screw. It would be scripted by Chad Hayes and Carey W. Hayes, with Roy Lee of Vertigo Entertainment, John Middleton and Scott Bernstein as producers. Haunted, which was to shoot under the DreamWorks label, would have been one of the first new projects to move forward since DreamWorks, Amblin and Participant Media formed the new Amblin Partners in late 2015, and after DreamWorks, which had been distributing its films through Disney's Touchstone Pictures since 2008, had struck a new distribution deal with Universal.

On August 1, 2016, it was announced that Alfre Woodard had signed on to the project. Later that month, Rose Leslie joined as the lead.

On September 21, 2016, five weeks before shooting was set to begin, Spielberg personally pulled the plug on the project because Scott Z. Burns' partial rewrite caused seismic changes in the story's fabric, altering characters, action, and even the title, and it no longer resembled the project the studio had signed on to make. Spielberg and DreamWorks decided the best course of action was to fire Fresnadillo and Burns, and resume using Hayes' original script, looking to start fresh development with a new director despite $5 million having been spent of the $17 million budget.

=== Sigismondi project (2017 onward) ===
On August 24, 2017, Deadline reported that Amblin Entertainment had set Floria Sigismondi to direct Haunted, now renamed as The Turning, which would feature a new draft by Jade Bartlett based on the original script by Chad and Carey W. Hayes. Production was expected to start in early 2018 with Scott Bernstein and Roy Lee still attached as producers, along with Seth William Meier. In October 2017, Mackenzie Davis signed on to portray the lead role of the nanny. In December 2017, it was announced that Finn Wolfhard had been cast as one of the orphans, and in January 2018, Brooklynn Prince was cast as the other. In February 2018, others actors were announced as principal production commenced. The casting of Joely Richardson was announced in January 2019.

=== Filming ===
Principal production began in Ireland on February 14, 2018, and filming began with the cast and crew behind strict security at Killruddery House in County Wicklow. Filming for Wolfhard and Prince concluded on March 27, 2018. Principal photography for the film completed on April 6, 2018.

== Music ==
The film's score is composed by Nathan Barr. Lawrence Rothman and their brother Yves produced the film's original soundtrack, which was deemed by Thrillist as better than the movie itself. The film's original soundtrack features tracks from Pale Waves, Mitski, girl in red, Kali Uchis, Vagabon, Courtney Love, Warpaint, Alice Glass, The Aubreys, Lawrence Rothman and Soccer Mommy.

The Turning (Original Motion Picture Soundtrack)
No.	Title	Performer	Length
1.	"Mother"	Courtney Love	3:18
2.	"Cop Car"	Mitski	3:04
3.	"Feed"	Soccer Mommy	2:44
4.	"kate's not here"	Girl in Red	2:57
5.	"SkindeepSkyhighHeartwide"	Lawrence Rothman; Pale Waves	4:07
6.	"Call Me"	Empress Of	4:01
7.	"The Wild"	Vagabon	3:01
8.	"Getting Better (otherwise)"	The Aubreys	2:46
9.	"Womb"	Cherry Glazerr	3:58
10.	"The Brakes"	Warpaint	4:39
11.	"Crust (neverreallyknewyou)"	Lawrence Rothman	2:16
12.	"Judas Kiss"	Lawrence Rothman; Muna	4:29
13.	"The Turn"	Kali Uchis	3:52
14.	"Sleep It Off"	Alice Glass	2:52
15.	"Ouroboros"	Dani Miller	3:23
16.	"I Don't Know"	Alison Mosshart	2:51
17.	"Take No Prisoners"	Living Things; Sunflower Bean	3:28
18.	"Crust"	Lawrence Rothman	2:50
19.	"Sliver"	Kim Gordon	2:50
Total length:			63:26

== Release ==
The Turning was theatrically released on January 24, 2020, domestically and in select international territories. Universal Pictures had originally scheduled the film for February 22, 2019. In September 2018, the film was moved back, with DreamWorks Animation's How to Train Your Dragon: The Hidden World being slated in its place.

== Reception ==
=== Box office ===
The Turning grossed $15.5 million in the United States and Canada, and $3.9 million in other territories, for a worldwide total of $19.4 million.

In the United States and Canada, the film was released alongside The Gentlemen, and was projected to gross $7–9 million from 3,000 theaters in its opening weekend. The film made $2.5 million on its first day, including $425,000 from Thursday night previews. It went on to debut to $7.3 million, finishing sixth at the box office. It then fell 56% to $3.1 million in its second weekend, finishing eighth.

=== Critical response ===
On review aggregator Rotten Tomatoes, the film holds an approval rating of 12% based on 103 reviews, and an average rating of 3.7/10. The website's critics consensus reads, "Stylish but muddled, this misbegotten adaptation of Henry James' classic novel will send horror-hungry viewers Turning to the source material instead." On Metacritic, the film has a weighted average score of 35 out of 100, based on 24 critics, indicating "generally unfavorable reviews". Audiences polled by CinemaScore gave the film a rare average grade of "F" on an A+ to F scale, while PostTrak reported an overall positive score of 34% (including an average 0 out of 5 stars), with 20% of people saying they would definitely recommend the film.
