= Jumping Ship =

2001 American TV movie

- Film poster
- Written by: Chad Hayes; Carey Hayes
- Directed by: Michael Lange
- Starring: Joseph Lawrence; Matthew Lawrence; Andrew Lawrence
- Theme music composer: Phil Marshall
- Country of origin: United States
- Original language: English

Production
- Producer: Diane Gutterud
- Cinematography: David Burr
- Editors: Benjamin Stokes; Terry Stokes
- Running time: 90 minutes

Original release
- Network: Disney Channel
- Release: August 17, 2001

Jumping Ship is a 2001 American adventure comedy-drama film and the sequel to the 1999 Disney Channel Original Movie, Horse Sense. It stars brothers Joseph, Matthew, and Andrew Lawrence. The film was directed by Michael Lange, and was shot in Australia.

== Plot ==
Although Michael has become a more mature individual since the first film and shows more concern for others, he still feels that, by birthright, he deserves to start at the top of his father's law firm. Michael's father does offer him a position at the law firm: a clerking job, and explains that only after thorough knowledge of the firm, a law school graduation, and passing the state bar will he ever be considered for a partnership.

Michael takes a summer vacation with Tommy to Australia. Michael has big plans to show his cousin Tommy a good time aboard a luxury yacht, until he discovers that the yacht he chartered is actually an old, rusty fishing boat. But when modern-day pirates chase the fishing boat, the boys are forced to jump ship, leaving them stranded on a desert island. The pirates are led by Frakes, who earlier had pick-pocketed Michael and discovered through his ID that he comes from a wealthy family. The pirates plan to kidnap Michael for a large ransom.

Meanwhile, Tommy and Michael struggle to find their way on the island to be met by the boat's captain, Jake Hunter, who scuttled the fishing boat to lose the pirates. He later admits he hated being a fishing boat captain and only stuck with it because it was his late-father's calling. After several days the pirates finally find the boys when Michael shoots a flare gun to get an airplane's attention. As they attempt to leave the island on their raft two of the pirates approach them. Michael and Jake swim away and leave Tommy who can't get his life jacket off behind, promising to rescue him later. Michael and Jake come up with a plan to get Tommy back.

Jake and Tommy outwit the pirates by absconding in their speedboat, Frakes attempts to shoot Michael, but fails due to his firearm being gunked up with quicksand he had gotten trapped in earlier while chasing Michael; leaving the villains stranded. As the boys escape they call the Australian Coast Guard for help. The pirates are arrested and their speedboat is seized.

During a lunch the boys have with Michael's father and Tommy's mom, Michael arrives and tells Jake and Tommy that due to asset forfeiture, Frakes' boat is now their property. Michael proposes using the speedboat, combined with the reward money, to launch a boat tour service with Jake and Tommy as his partners, and Jake captaining the boat. Michael also tells his father that he will begin the process for law school application, and accepts his dad's clerking job to help him prepare for that. Michael's father is proud of him for going into the business with him (but now with a more mature view), now realizing that there is no royal road to success.

== Cast ==
- Joseph Lawrence as Michael Woods
- Matthew Lawrence as Jake Hunter
- Andrew Lawrence as Tommy Biggs, Michael's cousin
- Susan Walters as Jules Biggs, Tommy's mother and Michael's aunt
- Stephen Burleigh as Glenn Woods, Michael's father and Tommy's uncle
- Anthony Wong as Frakes
- Jaime Passier-Armstrong as Jonas, Frakes' henchwoman
- Martin Dingle-Wall as Dante, Frakes' henchman
- Todd Worden as Mark Sanders
- Carly Movizio as Heather Hitt
- Jack Heywood as Valet

== Home media ==
The film was released on DVD as an exclusive on the Disney Movie Club promotional website in early 2005. In November 2019, the film became available to stream on Disney+.

== Reception ==
Laura Fries of Variety wrote that the film "works as passable family entertainment for now, but it won't have much of a shelf life." As a Disney film, she wrote that "the danger is relatively lacking in malice, so the action never generates much of a thrill." Daryl H. Miller of the Los Angeles Times called it a "playful if entirely predictable Disney Channel movie", writing that the Lawrence brothers "deliver wholesomeness, charisma and, from time to time, genuinely commendable acting."
