= Matthew Lawrence =

American actor and singer (born 1980)

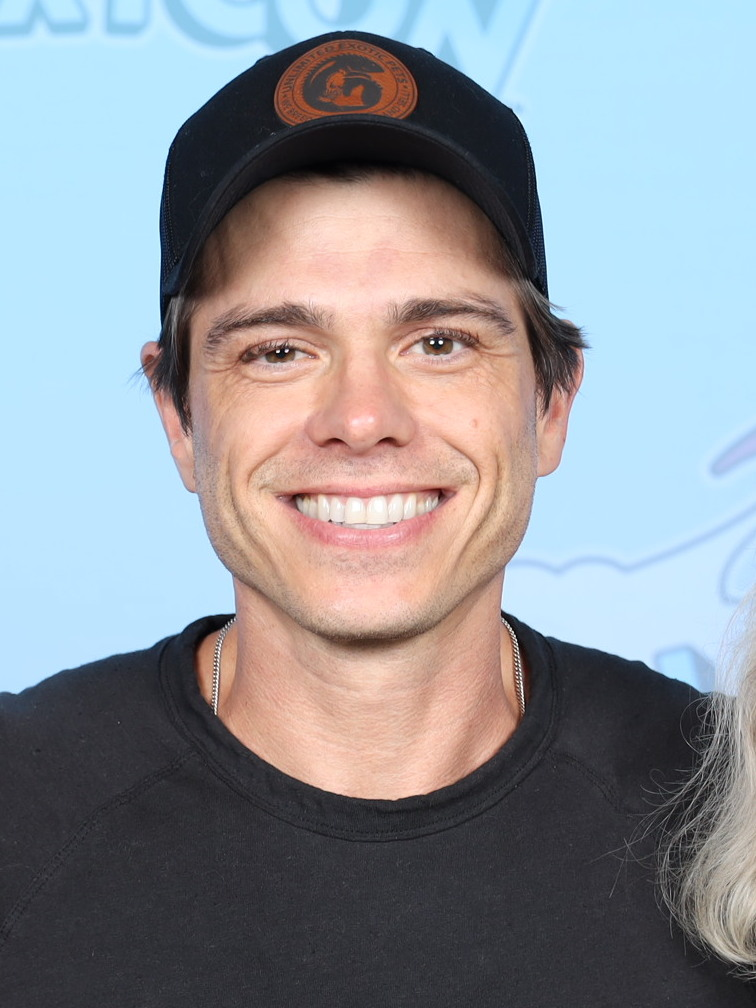
- Lawrence at GalaxyCon Raleigh in 2023
- Born: Matthew William Mignogna; February 11, 1980 (age 46); Abington Township, Montgomery County, Pennsylvania, U.S.
- Other names: Matt W. Lawrence, Matthew Mignogna
- Occupations: Actor, singer
- Years active: 1984–present
- Spouse: Cheryl Burke (m. 2019; div. 2022)
- Partner: Rozonda Thomas (2022–present)
- Relatives: Joey Lawrence (brother); Andrew Lawrence (brother)

Matthew Lawrence (born Matthew William Mignogna; February 11, 1980) is an American actor, podcaster, and singer who is widely known for his roles in Mrs. Doubtfire, Boy Meets World, The Hot Chick, Superhuman Samurai Syber-Squad, and Kiki's Delivery Service. Lawrence also starred in the series Brotherly Love with his real-life brothers Joey and Andrew.

== Early life ==
Lawrence was born on February 11, 1980, in Abington Township, Montgomery County, Pennsylvania to Donna Lynn (née Shaw), a personnel manager and former elementary school teacher, and Joseph Lawrence Mignogna Jr., an insurance broker. His family's surname was changed to Lawrence from Mignogna when he was a toddler. The middle-born of three boys, Lawrence has two brothers, Joey and Andrew, both of whom are also actors. He attended classes at Abington Friends School.

== Career ==
Lawrence began acting in the mid-1980s, playing Danny Carrington in Dynasty. He studied acting at HB Studio in New York City. Lawrence continued as a child actor through the early 1990s, appearing in many television and feature film roles, including the Robin Williams comedy Mrs. Doubtfire (1993) and the mid-1990s television series Superhuman Samurai Syber-Squad. He maintained starring roles in Brotherly Love, which starred his real-life brothers, and in Boy Meets World, in which Lawrence played Jack Hunter. Lawrence also appeared alongside Christopher Lloyd in Angels in the Endzone and starred in the Disney English dub version of Kiki's Delivery Service with Kirsten Dunst and Phil Hartman in 1998.

In 2011, Lawrence guest-starred on his brother's sitcom, ABC Family's Melissa & Joey. Four years later, Lawrence reprised his role as Jack Hunter in the series Girl Meets World, a spin-off/sequel of Boy Meets World.

Lawrence competed on the twenty-fourth season of Worst Cooks in America, the show's seventh celebrity edition titled That's So '90s, which aired in April and May 2022.

In February 2023, the three Lawrence brothers launched a podcast, titled Brotherly Love, centered around rewatches of the sitcom. It was launched through PodCo, a podcast studio launched by actress Christy Carlson Romano and focused on rewatches of completed television series by their former actors.

In 2025, Lawrence competed in season thirteen of The Masked Singer as "Paparazzo" which resembles a camera-headed figure that features a lightbulb that flashes randomly on his mask. Lawrence was eliminated in "Lucky 6: Merging of The Masks".

Also in 2025, Lawrence co-created the graphic novel The Lawrence Brothers Detective Agency alongside his brothers Andrew Lawrence and Joey Lawrence, and writers Ben Berkowitz and Max Berkowitz, known as the Berkowitz Brothers. The project, published by Z2 Comics with artwork by Sean Von Gorman, reimagines the brothers as fictional detectives in a story inspired by The Hardy Boys, Scooby-Doo, and 1990s pop culture. The graphic novel releases in September 2026

In 2026, Lawrence competed in the HGTV series Totally 90s House while being partnered with actresses, Melissa Joan Hart and Keshia Knight Pulliam.

== Music career ==
Lawrence's singing debut was in 1986, when he and his brother Joey performed at the 1986 Macy's Thanksgiving Day Parade. Lawrence sang at the 1991 Macy's Parade as well. Other musical performances can be found on two Gimme a Break! episodes, "Nell's Secret Admirer" and "The Window; Part 1"; two Brotherly Love episodes, "A Roman Holiday" and "Art Attack"; and on Boy Meets World. In the 2021 film Mistletoe Mixup, he performed "O Holy Night" with his brothers Joey and Andrew. Lawrence also played guitar on several of his earlier performances.

In 2017, Lawrence started a band with Joey and Andy called Still Three. That February, they released their debut single "Lose Myself".

== Personal life ==
Lawrence briefly dated his Boy Meets World co-star Danielle Fishel. He was engaged to actress Heidi Mueller from 2004 to 2006. Lawrence dated professional dancer Cheryl Burke from 2007 to 2008. The pair reunited in 2017 and became engaged on May 3, 2018. They wed in San Diego, California on May 23, 2019. After a prolonged estrangement exacerbated by COVID-19, Burke filed for divorce on February 18, 2022. The divorce was finalized on September 19.

In late 2022, Lawrence began dating Chilli of the R&B group TLC.

In April 2023, Lawrence revealed in a Brotherly Love podcast episode that he was sexually harassed by a director involved in a Marvel production and was fired by his agency when he walked out of the hotel room that they were in.

== Filmography ==
=== Film ===
| Year | Title | Role | Notes |
|---|---|---|---|
| 1987 | Planes, Trains and Automobiles | Neal Jr. | |
| 1988 | Pulse | Stevie | |
| 1990 | Tales from the Darkside: The Movie | Timmy | |
| 1993 | Mrs. Doubtfire | Christopher "Chris" Hillard | |
| 1998 | The Hairy Bird | Dennis | AKA, All I Wanna Do |
| 1998 | Rusty: A Dog's Tale | Rusty the Dog (voice) | |
| 1998 | Kiki's Delivery Service | Tombo (voice) | Disney English dub |
| 1999 | Family Tree | Mark Musser | |
| 2000 | Glow | Jeremy | |
| 2000 | Boltneck | Frank Stein | |
| 2002 | Cheats | Victor | |
| 2002 | The Hot Chick | Billy | |
| 2006 | Monster Night | Brock | Video |
| 2007 | The Comebacks | Lance Truman | |
| 2008 | Trucker | Scott | |
| 2009 | Creature of Darkness | Lance | |
| 2011 | Fort McCoy | Dan Griffin | |
| 2013 | My Santa | Chris | |
| 2020 | The Office Mix-Up | Greg | |
| 2020 | Money Plane | The Cowboy | |
| 2021 | Mistletoe Mixup | Austin Right | |
| 2022 | Double Threat | Jimmy | |
| 2024 | Marry Christmas | Austin Right | |

=== Television ===
| Year | Title | Role | Notes |
|---|---|---|---|
| 1984–1985 | Dynasty | Danny Carrington | 3 episodes |
| 1985 | Sara | Jesse Webber | Recurring role |
| 1985 | ABC Afterschool Special | Matt | Episode: "Don't Touch" |
| 1986–1987 | Gimme a Break! | Matthew Donovan | Main role |
| 1988 | David | David Rothenberg | Television film |
| 1989 | Wilfrid's Special Christmas | Wilfrid Gordon McDonald Partridge | Television film |
| 1990 | Joshua's Heart | Joshua | Television film |
| 1990 | Lifestories: Families in Crisis | | Episode: "The Hawkins Family" |
| 1991 | The Summer My Father Grew Up | Timmy | Television film |
| 1991 | Daddy | Sam Watson | Television film |
| 1991–1994 | Blossom | Young Joey | 3 episodes |
| 1991–1992 | Drexell's Class | Walker | Main role |
| 1991–1992 | Walter & Emily | Zach Collins | Main role |
| 1992 | With a Vengeance | Phillip Barcetti | Television film |
| 1994–1995 | Superhuman Samurai Syber-Squad | Michael Samuel "Sam" Collins / Servo | Main role |
| 1995 | Bringing Up Jack | Ryan McMahon | 6 episodes |
| 1995–1997 | Brotherly Love | Matt Roman | Main role |
| 1996 | Brothers of the Frontier | Aaron Frye | Television film |
| 1996 | Adventures from the Book of Virtues | Tom Sawyer (voice) | Episode: "Work" |
| 1997 | Angels in the Endzone | Jesse Harper | Television film |
| 1997–2000 | Boy Meets World | Jack Hunter | Main role |
| 1999 | H-E Double Hockey Sticks | Dave Heinrich | Television film |
| 1999 | Horse Sense | Cowboy at Airport (uncredited) | Television film |
| 2000 | Girl Band | Mike | Television film |
| 2001 | Jumping Ship | Jake Hunter | Television film |
| 2003 | CSI: Miami | Chuck Shaw | Episode: "Hard Time" |
| 2004 | Boston Public | Billy Deegan | Episode: "Chapter 80" |
| 2011–2014 | Melissa & Joey | Tony Longo | 4 episodes |
| 2011 | Inside Carly | Jim | Unknown episodes |
| 2014 | The Dog Who Saved Easter | Will | Television film |
| 2015 | Workaholics | Coast Guard Guy | Episode: "Dorm Daze" |
| 2015 | Girl Meets World | Jack Hunter | Episode: "Girl Meets Semi-Formal" |
| 2019 | Hawaii Five-0 | Josh Baker | Episode: "Hapai ke kuko, hanau ka hewa" |
| 2021 | Mistletoe Mixup | Austin Wright | Television film |
| 2022 | Worst Cooks in America | Himself | Contestant |
| 2024 | NCIS | Danny Butler | Episode: "In from the Cold" |
| 2025 | The Masked Singer | Himself/Paparazzo | Contestant |
| 2026 | Second Chance Love | Himself | Hallmark Reality TV Show |
| 2026 | Totally 90s House | Himself | Contestant |
