= Doug Savant =

American film and television actor

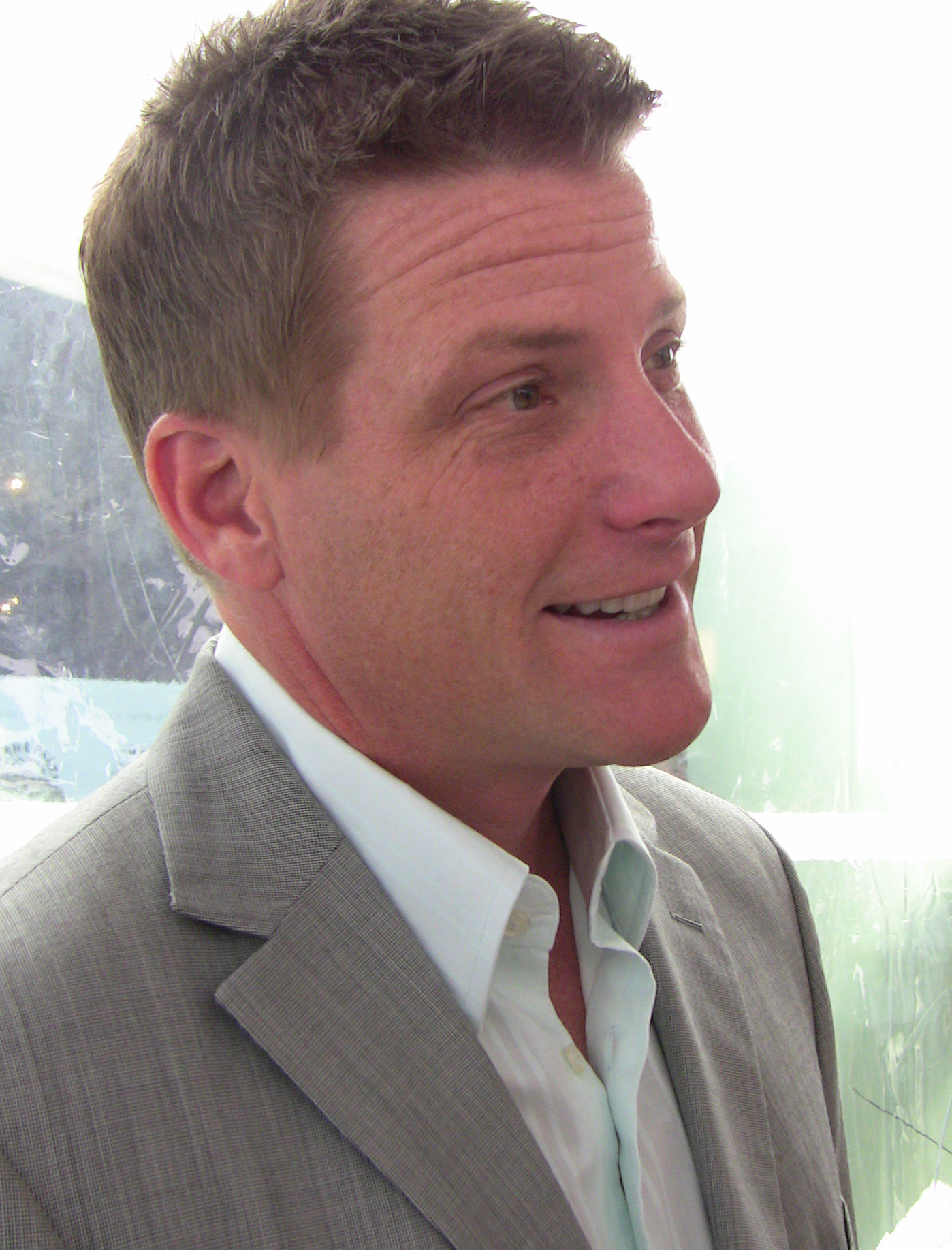
- Savant in April 2009
- Born: Douglas Peter Savant; June 21, 1964 (age 62); Burbank, California, U.S.
- Occupation: Actor
- Years active: 1984–present
- Spouses: Dawn Dunkin (m. 1983; div. 1997) Laura Leighton (m. 1998)
- Children: 4

Douglas Peter Savant (born June 21, 1964) is an American actor. He is known for his roles as Matt Fielding in the Fox prime time soap opera Melrose Place (1992–1997), Tom Scavo in ABC comedy-drama Desperate Housewives (2004–2012), and as Sgt. O'Neal in Godzilla (1998).

== Early life ==
Savant was born and raised in Burbank, California. He attended University of California, Los Angeles, but left before graduating to pursue his acting career.

== Career ==
Savant began his career appearing in teen comedy films Secret Admirer and Teen Wolf in 1985, and the following year appeared in horror film Trick or Treat. From 1986 to 1987, he had a recurring role as a younger version of Mac McKenzie (played by Kevin Dobson) in the CBS prime time soap opera Knots Landing. He was paired with future Desperate Housewives co-star Nicollette Sheridan, who played a younger version of the Anne Matheson character portrayed by Michelle Phillips. In 1988, he co-starred in erotic thriller film Masquerade alongside Rob Lowe, Meg Tilly, and Kim Cattrall.

From 1992 to 1997, Savant starred as Matt Fielding in the Fox prime time soap opera Melrose Place, a role that was notable for being one of the first openly gay lead characters on a television series. However, his role was censored greatly by the network - notably a kiss between Matt and guest star Ty Miller during the Season 2 finale was edited out at the last minute by FOX. Savant left the series after five seasons and, a year later, his character was killed off-screen in a car crash. In 1998, he appeared in monster film Godzilla playing Sgt. O'Neal, and the following years had guest-starring roles on The Outer Limits, Profiler, Firefly, JAG, Nip/Tuck, NYPD Blue, and CSI: Crime Scene Investigation. In 2004, he had a four-episode arc on 24.

In 2004, Savant was cast as Tom Scavo in the ABC comedy-drama series, Desperate Housewives. In the first season (2004–05), Tom was originally credited as a recurring role throughout Season 1, but became credited as a series regular in Season 2. Married to Lynette Scavo (Felicity Huffman), he was out of town regularly on business. Viewer response to Savant and his character led the producers to contract him as a series regular from Season 2 onwards, and Tom and Lynette were portrayed as the most stable couple on the series. The series ended in 2012, and the following years, Savant had guest-starring roles in a number of shows, including Hot in Cleveland, Criminal Minds, 9-1-1 and NCIS.

== Personal life ==
In May 1998, he married his Melrose Place co-star Laura Leighton. They have two children together: Jack (born October 10, 2000) and Lucy (born June 9, 2005). Savant also has two children from a previous marriage whom Leighton helped raise, Arianna (born January 17, 1992) and Madeline (born July 20, 1993).

== Filmography ==
=== Film ===
Year	Title	Role	Notes
1984	Swing Shift	Actor	
1985	Secret Admirer	Boy	
1985	Teen Wolf	Brad	
1986	Trick or Treat	Tim Hainey	
1987	The Hanoi Hilton	Ashby	
1988	Masquerade	Mike McGill	
1989	Paint It Black	Eric Hinsley	
1990	Red Surf	Attila	
1990	Shaking the Tree	Michael	
1993	Maniac Cop III: Badge of Silence	Dr. Peter Myerson	
1998	Godzilla	Sgt. O'Neal	
1999	First Daughter	Grant Coleman	
2000	Dropping Out	Doctor	
2001	The One	Cop	Uncredited
2006	All You've Got	Sam McDonald	
2014	April Rain	Special Agent Singleton	

=== Television ===
Year	Title	Role	Notes
1985	Cagney & Lacey	Dwayne Patterson	Episode: "Violation"
1986	Hotel	Elliot Jessup	Episode: "Scapegoat"
1986	Alfred Hitchcock Presents	Joey Medwick	Episode: "Road Hog"
1986–87	Knots Landing	Young Mack Mackenzie	7 episodes
1987	The Facts of Life	Dwayne	Episode: "A Winter's Tale"
1987	Stingray	Cdt. Thomas O'Conner	Episode: "Night Maneuvers"
1988	In the Heat of the Night	Scott LaPierre	2 episodes: "Pilot: Part 1", "Pilot: Part 2"
1990	China Beach	Richard	Episode: "The Thanks of a Grateful Nation"
1990	The Knife and Gun Club	Dr. Barrow	TV movie
1990	Jake and the Fatman	John Bronski	Episode: "God Bless the Child"
1991	Aftermath: A Test of Love	Jeff	TV movie
1992	Columbo	Detective Dennis Mulrooney	Episode: "No Time to Die"
1992	Bonnie & Clyde: The True Story	Deputy Sheriff Ted Hinton	TV movie
1992–98	Melrose Place	Matt Fielding	Series Regular; 162 episodes
1995	Burke's Law	Chase Cobb	Episode: "Who Killed the World's Greatest Chef?"
1995	Fight for Justice: The Nancy Conn Story	Richard Mark Ellard	TV movie
1996	Terminal	Dr. Sean O'Grady	TV movie
1998	Love Boat: The Next Wave	Josh Walters	Episode: "Smooth Sailing"
1998	The Outer Limits	Kel	Episode: "The Hunt"
1999	Profiler	Toby Watson	Episode: "Inheritance"
1999	A Face to Kill For	Virgil	TV movie
1999	First Daughter	Grant Coleman	TV movie
2000	Harsh Realm	Sergeant Sommers	Episode: "Kein Ausgang"
2000	Godzilla: The Series	Trespasser #2	Episode: "Area 51"
2000	First Target	Grant Coleman	TV movie
2001	That's Life	J.T.'s Cousin	Episode: "Or What's a Heaven For?"
2001	The District	Jeffrey Riverton	Episode: "To Serve and Protect"
2001	Family Law	Harold Raines	Episode: "Sacrifices"
2002	Firefly	Commander Harken	Episode: "Bushwhacked"
2002	JAG	Navy Seals Commander	Episode: "Dangerous Game"
2002	First Shot	Grant Coleman	TV movie
2002	According to Jim	Rick	Episode: "The Bachelor"
2004	24	Craig Phillips	4 episodes
2004	The Guardian	Eric Kane	Episode: "Legacy"
2004	Faultline	Prof. Anthony McAllister	TV movie
2004	NYPD Blue	Jason Foster	Episode: "Chatty Chatty Bang Bang"
2004	NCIS: Naval Criminal Investigative Service	Father Larry Clannon	Episode: "A Weak Link"
2004	Nip/Tuck	Joel Gideon	Episode: "Joel Gideon"
2004	CSI: Crime Scene Investigation	Paul Brady	Episode: "Swap Meet"
2004–12	Desperate Housewives	Tom Scavo	Recurring role (season 1); Main role (seasons 2–8); 176 Episodes; Screen Actors Guild Award for Outstanding Performance by an Ensemble in a Comedy Series, 2006; Nominated — Screen Actors Guild Award for Outstanding Performance by an Ensemble in a Comedy Series, 2007–2009
2008	Playing for Keeps	Peter Marcheson	TV movie
2012	Hot in Cleveland	Scott	Episode: "Two Girls and a Rhino"
2013	Vegas	Mr. Binder	Episode: "Road Trip"
2013	Rizzoli & Isles	Judge Roger Thorson	Episode: "Judge, Jury & Executioner"
2013	Drop Dead Diva	Jacob Joardi	Episode: "Jane's Secret Revealed"
2013	Criminal Minds	Malcolm Taffert	Episode: "The Caller"
2014	Hawaii Five-0	Robert Young	Episode: "Wawahi moeʻuhane"- Broken Dreams
2015	Scorpion	Wilson Adler	Episode: "Tech, Drugs, and Rock 'n Roll"
2016	The X-Files	Augustus Goldman	Episode: "Founder's Mutation"
2016	Castle	Trevor Nigel	Episode: "The G.D.S."
2016	Halt and Catch Fire	Mac Harpor	Episode: "One Way or Another"
2016	Pure Genius	Simon Monroe	Episode: "It’s Your Friendly Neighborhood Spider Silk Surgery"
2016	Notorious	Paul Weston	2 episodes
2017	SEAL Team	Malcolm	Episode: "Borderlines"
2018	9-1-1	Matthew Clark	2 episodes
2018	Lucifer	Forest Clay	Episode: "Quintessential Deckerstar"
2018	NCIS: New Orleans	Eric Barlow	2 episodes
2019	NCIS	Brigadier General Daniel Kent	Episode: "Hail & Farewell"
2020	Dirty John	Martin Newsome	2 episodes
2020	L.A.'s Finest	Richard Reeves	Episode: "Kangaroo Jack"
2020	S.W.A.T.	Mark	Episode: "Gunpowder Treason"
2021	Tell Me Your Secrets	Ed Jennings	2 episodes
2021	The Rookie	Benjamin	Episode: "True Crime"
2022	Leverage: Redemption	AG James Hodgins	Episode: "The Fractured Job"
2023	The Company You Keep	Pastor Earle	Episode: "Pilot"
2024	The Cleaning Lady	Oliver Gordon	Episode : "From the Ashes"
2025	I Was A Child Bride: The Courtney Stodden Story	Doug Hutchison	TV movie
2026	Chicago Fire	Chief Richard Tomlin	2 episodes
