= First Daughter (1999 film) =

1999 American television film

- VHS cover
- Written by: Chad Hayes; Carey W. Hayes
- Directed by: Armand Mastroianni
- Starring: Mariel Hemingway; Monica Keena; Gregory Harrison; Doug Savant; Dominic Purcell; Alan Dale; Diamond Dallas Page
- Music by: Louis Febre
- Country of origin: United States
- Original language: English

Production
- Executive producer: Tom Patricia
- Producer: Michael O. Gallant
- Production location: Australia
- Cinematography: Mark Wareham
- Editor: Peter V. White
- Running time: 102 minutes
- Production companies: Mandalay Television; Lions Gate Television; Columbia TriStar Television
- Budget: $5 million

Original release
- Network: TBS Superstation
- Release: August 15, 1999

Related
- First Target (2000)

First Daughter is a 1999 American action thriller television film directed by Armand Mastroianni and written by Chad Hayes and Carey W. Hayes. It stars Mariel Hemingway as a United States Secret Service agent who must rescue the daughter of the President from domestic terrorists. Gregory Harrison, Doug Savant, and Diamond Dallas Page also star, with Monica Keena playing the title character. It aired on TBS Superstation on August 15, 1999.

The film was followed by two sequels, First Target (2000) and First Shot (2002).

== Plot ==
A domestic terrorist group make an unsuccessful attempt on the life of US President Jonathan Hayes and the group's leader, Michael Smith, is subsequently captured. Some members of the group manage to evade capture and continue with terrorist activities. Eight weeks later, believing the threat is past, the President organizes an outdoors activity trip for his teenage daughter, Jess, who has grown tired of the public life and constant Secret Service supervision. Jess, excited about the trip, is disappointed to learn a Secret Service agent she dislikes, Alex McGregor, will be accompanying her, despising her over a misunderstood embrace between her father and Alex. Jess goes so far as to spread rumors about Alex during the trip, leaving an air of animosity between the two of them.

Unbeknownst to the hikers, during their trip they are seen by members of the domestic terrorist group who have been hiding out in the same woods to evade capture. The terrorists initially believe they are witnessing a normal group of hikers, but soon notice bodyguards with guns. One of the group recognizes Jess, and identifies her as the daughter of President Hayes. They quickly form a plan to kidnap Jess in order to negotiate the release of Smith. They ambush the hikers, kill two of the bodyguards, and kidnap Jess.

With the help of one of the river guides, Grant Coleman, Alex searches for Jess and attempts a daring rescue.

== Cast ==
- Mariel Hemingway as Secret Service Agent Alex McGregor
- Monica Keena as First Daughter Jessica "Jess" Hayes
- Doug Savant as Grant Coleman
- Dallas Page as Dirk Lindman
- Alan Dale as Secret Service Director Daly
- Dominic Purcell as Troy Nelson
- Gregory Harrison as President Jonathan Jesse Hayes
- David Wheeler as Michael Smith
- Chris Sadrinna as Eric Nelson
- Paul Tassone as Mark
