= Andrew Lawrence (actor) =

American actor, filmmaker and singer (born 1988)

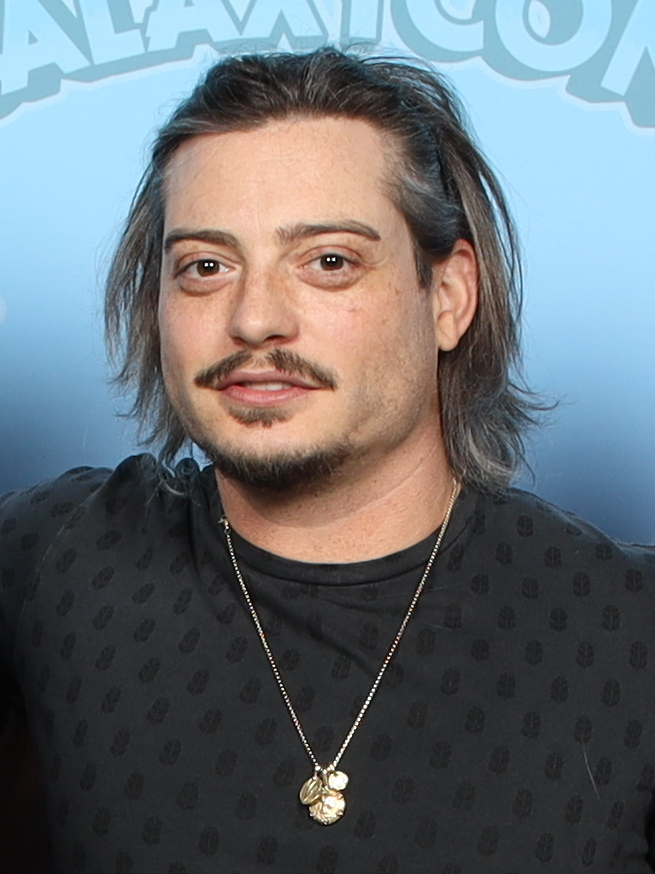
- Lawrence at GalaxyCon Richmond in 2024
- Born: Andrew James Mignogna; January 12, 1988 (age 38); Abington, Pennsylvania, U.S.
- Other names: Andy J. Lawrence, Andrew Mignogna
- Occupations: Actor; filmmaker; podcaster; singer
- Years active: 1991–present
- Relatives: Joey Lawrence (brother); Matthew Lawrence (brother)

Andrew Lawrence (born Andrew James Mignogna; January 12, 1988) is an American actor, filmmaker, podcaster and singer. He is known for his roles as Andy Roman in Brotherly Love (starring with his real life brothers Joey and Matthew) and T.J. Detweiler in Recess. Outside of his acting and music career, Lawrence made his directorial debut with the 2020 film The Office Mix-Up.

== Early life ==
Lawrence was born on January 12, 1988, in Abington, Pennsylvania, to Donna Lynn (née Shaw), a personal talent manager and former elementary school teacher, and Joseph Lawrence Mignogna Jr., an insurance broker. He is of Italian, English, and Scottish descent. His family's surname was changed to "Lawrence" from "Mignogna" before he was born. Lawrence is the youngest brother of actors Joey Lawrence and Matthew Lawrence.

== Career ==
He started in show business at age three and made his professional acting debut in the television series Blossom, as Little Joey. In 1998, he became the voice of T.J. Detweiler in Disney's animated television series Recess, replacing Ross Malinger after voicing the character for two seasons. He would reprise the role again in the feature film and in several direct-to-video films, including Recess Christmas: Miracle on Third Street and Recess: All Growed Down. He has also done voice overs for video game characters, such as Pac in Battlefield 4 and Nick Ramos in Dead Rising 3. In November 2016, Lawrence released his debut EP, Kings March. That same year, Lawrence started a band with his brothers, Joey and Matt, named Still 3. The trio released its debut single, "Lose Myself," in February 2017.

In 2023, Andrew launched a podcast called "Brotherly Love Podcast" with his brothers Joey and Matthew. It was launched through PodCo, a podcast studio launched by actress Christy Carlson Romano and focused on rewatches of completed television series by their former actors.

In 2025, Lawrence co-created the graphic novel The Lawrence Brothers Detective Agency alongside his brothers Joey Lawrence and Matthew Lawrence, and writers Ben Berkowitz and Max Berkowitz, known as the Berkowitz Brothers. The project, published by Z2 Comics with artwork by Sean Von Gorman, reimagines the brothers as fictional detectives in a story inspired by The Hardy Boys, Scooby-Doo, and 1990s pop culture. The graphic novel releases in September 2026.

== Filmography ==
=== Film ===
Year	Title	Role	Notes
1995	White Man's Burden	Donnie Pinnock	
1997	Bean	Kevin Langley	
1998	Jack Frost	Tuck Gronic	
1999	Family Tree	Mitch Musser	
2000	The Other Me	Twoie/Will Browning	
2001	Recess: School's Out	T.J. Detweiler	Voice
2001	Recess Christmas: Miracle on Third Street	T.J. Detweiler	Voice, direct to video
2003	Recess: All Growed Down	Young T.J.	Voice, direct to video
2004	Sniper 3	MP Mangold	
2006	Fingerprints	Mitch	
2008	The Least of These	Jason Boyd	
2010	Bones	Anthony	
2012	October 31	—N/a	Short
2013	Confessions of a Womanizer	Ritchie	
2014	The Arrangement	Louis Stanley	Short
2015	Big Baby	Thirty year old Baby Bobby	Also producer
2015	When Duty Calls	Sandy	
2019	Better Than Love	Jon	Also producer
2020	Money Plane	Iggy	Also director
2020	The Office Mix-up	John	Also director
2021	Mistletoe Mixup	Seth	Also director
2023	Frankie Meets Jack	Nathaniel	Also director
2024	Marry Christmas	Seth Wright	Also director

=== Television ===
Year	Title	Role	Notes
1991–1994	Blossom	Young Joey, Boy at the Magic Sword	3 episodes; uncredited
1994	Cries Unheard: The Donna Yaklich Story	Young Denny Yaklich	Television film
1994	Tom	Donnie Graham	Main role (12 episodes)
1995	Prince for a Day	Timmy	Television film
1995–1997	Brotherly Love	Andy Roman	Main role (40 episodes)
1996	Brothers of the Frontier	Jamie Frye	Television film
1996	Deadly Web	Spence Lawrence	Television film
1996	Adventures from the Book of Virtues	Ben Rogers	Voice, episode: "Work"
1998	Carson's Vertical Suburbia	Drake	Television film
1998	The Lionhearts	N/A	Voice, 3 episodes
1998	Young Hearts Unlimited	Zack	Television film
1998–2001	Recess	T.J. Detweiler	Voice, main role
1999	The Kids from Room 402	Vinnie Nasta	Voice, episode: "Son of Einstein"
1999	Horse Sense	Tommy Biggs	Television film
2000	The Other Me	Will Browning, Twoie	Television film
2000	Tucker	Kenickie Behar	8 episodes
2000	As Told by Ginger	Bathroom Chef	Voice, episode: "Cry Wolf"
2000	King of the Hill	Rodeo Kid	Voice, 2 episodes
2001	School's In	Host	Television film
2001	Jumping Ship	Tommy Biggs	Television film
2002	The Zeta Project	Carl Finley	Voice, episode: "Eye of the Storm"
2002	The Guardian	Ronnie Wagner	Episode: "Monster"
2003–2004	Oliver Beene	Tayler 'Ted' Mark Beene	Main role (24 episodes)
2004	Going to the Mat	Jace Newfield	Television film
2006	Runaway	Brady Sullivan	Recurring role
2008	Bones	Tim	Episode: "The Man in the Mud"
2009	United States of Tara	Jason Maurio	Recurring role
2009	Chasing a Dream	Cam Stiles	Television film
2009	The Closer	Eric Whitner	Episode: "Red Tape"
2009	CSI: NY	Jake Calaveras	Episode: "Epilogue"
2011	Castle	Tommy Marcone	Episode: "The Dead Pool"
2011–2014	Melissa & Joey	Evan McKay	2 episodes
2013–2018	Hawaii Five-0	Eric Russo	Recurring role (17 episodes)
2013	Blast Vegas	T.J.	Television film
2013	Shadow on the Mesa	J.T. Dowdy	Television film
2014	NCIS: Los Angeles	Stuart Woods	Episode: "Humbug"
2014	Perception	Henry Wilmyer, Micah Conley	Episode: "Curveball"
2015	CSI: Cyber	Tobin	Episode: "Crowd Sourced"
2023	My Best Friend the Baby Snatcher	Director; Writer	Television Film

=== Video games ===
Year	Title	Role	Notes
2013	Battlefield 4	Sergeant Clayton 'Pac' Pakowski	
2013	Dead Rising 3	Nick Ramos	
2014	The Amazing Spider-Man 2	Civilian Male, Task Force Flying	
2019	Need for Speed Heat	Player	Voice, motion capture, and model for Caucasian male option

== Discography ==
=== EPs ===
- Kings March (2016)
