= Twisted Desire =

1996 American thriller television film by Craig R. Baxley

- Promotional advertisement
- Genre: Crime thriller
- Written by: Carey W. Hayes; Chad Hayes
- Directed by: Craig R. Baxley
- Starring: Melissa Joan Hart; Daniel Baldwin; Jeremy Jordan; Meadow Sisto; Isabella Hofmann; David Lascher; Eric Laneuville; Kurt Fuller
- Music by: Gary Chang
- Country of origin: United States
- Original language: English

Production
- Executive producers: Judith A. Polone; Harry Winer
- Producer: Judy Cairo
- Cinematography: João Fernandes
- Editor: Sonny Baskin
- Running time: 96 minutes
- Production company: Polone/Winer Productions

Original release
- Network: NBC
- Release: May 13, 1996

Twisted Desire is a 1996 American crime thriller television film directed by Craig R. Baxley and written by twin brothers Carey and Chad Hayes. It stars Melissa Joan Hart, with real-life domestic partners Daniel Baldwin and Isabella Hofmann. The movie also stars Meadow Sisto, David Lascher, Eric Laneuville, Kurt Fuller, and R&B/pop singer Jeremy Jordan, with Collin Wilcox Paxton in a supporting role. It aired on May 13, 1996, on NBC.

The film is presented as based on real events: the 1990 double murder of James Baxter "J.B." and Katherine "Kathy" Wiseman in Hartfield, Virginia, committed by their 14-year-old daughter Jessica Lynn Wiseman and her 17-year-old boyfriend, Douglas Christopher Thomas. Thomas was executed in 2000, when the death penalty for juveniles was still a legal punishment, while Wiseman was tried as a juvenile and sentenced to six years in prison, from which she was released at age 21.

== Plot ==
Jennifer Stanton is a wealthy, rebellious teenager whose father, Bill, is overprotective, strict, and controlling, while her mother, Susan, barely takes her side. When Bill prohibits Jennifer from attending a concert, this—along with Bill's strictness in general—becomes the last straw for her boyfriend, Brad, who breaks up with her. The following morning, Bill admonishes Jennifer for dressing in clothing he deems too 'revealing' for school and forces her to change. Jennifer and her best friend, Karen Winkler, detour to a gas station so they can get gas and Jennifer can change back into her original outfit in the bathroom. The attendant, Nick Ryan, accidentally walks in on her changing; afterwards, Jennifer realizes that she's lost her wallet, leaving her unable to pay the $10 gas fare. Nick, approaching her & Karen, tells Jennifer that it's no big deal and she can pay him later. Karen tells Jennifer that Nick was a former student at their high school and he was just recently released from jail for assault.

At school, Jennifer sees Brad with his new girlfriend, Emma Thomas. Jennifer tries to rekindle her relationship with Brad, but Brad remains staunch on no longer seeing her due to her father's overbearingness. Jennifer tries asking Brad to accompany her to her friend Mark Pearson's party being held that night, but Emma interjects and states that Brad has already asked her to be his date for the party. The both of them then leave for class as the bell rings, leaving a confused and bewildered Jennifer in their place.

In class, Emma and her friends sneer at Jennifer as the classroom gets ready for a pop quiz. Jennifer is suddenly called to the front office. She encounters Nick in the hallway, who's come to the school to bring her back her wallet, which she'd forgotten at the gas station. Nick asks her if she'd like to be his date for Mark's party, which Jennifer initially rebuffs, citing that her parents would disapprove. Realizing the opportunity to potentially make Brad jealous, Jennifer changes her mind and agrees to accompany Nick to the party.

That night, Jennifer lies to her parents and uses studying for a midterm on the French Revolution at Karen's house as cover for going to the party. At the party, Jennifer bonds with Nick and they play pool together; meanwhile, Karen and their other friend, Bobbi, observe Brad with Emma and remark how they couldn't believe he dumped Jennifer and got back together with Emma, who reportedly cheated on him by writing love letters to other boys. Brad sees Jennifer having fun with Nick and expresses jealousy.

Back at the Stanton household, Bill harbors suspicions that Jennifer lied about the French history exam so that she could go out and phones Karen's mother, Trish, to verify if his daughter is really studying at their house; Susan attempts to stop him, to no avail. Trish reveals to Bill that Jennifer and Karen are at Mark's party. Bill immediately drives to Mark's house to retrieve Jennifer. Meanwhile, back at the party, Brad waits for Jennifer outside the restroom and remarks his surprise that her dad allowed her out tonight; additionally, he apologizes for dumping her, while also expressing hurt at the fact that she ignored him and was with another guy all night. Bill disrupts their conversation and forcibly drags Jennifer out of the party in front of all of her friends; among the onlookers of this spectacle is Nick.

At home, Jennifer screams at her father for humiliating her tonight, as well as for being too strict and controlling in general, and laments that she wishes she could have the freedom her friends have. Bill is firm and unwavering, however, and states that as long as Jennifer lives in his house, she must abide by his rules. Susan goes along with Bill and does little to defend Jennifer, which only further enrages her. She storms off, even as Bill demands her not to walk away from him, and goes to her bedroom to calm down.

Nick then appears, having climbed onto Jennifer's second-story balcony, and gives her a rose flower he picked. Jennifer speculates the whole party must be talking badly about her after what happened tonight; to which Nick reassures her that they aren't. Nick confesses he's interested in Jennifer and expresses his desire to be in a relationship with her. Jennifer turns him down, invoking that her parents "are famous for ruining [her] relationships" and that because of this, it wouldn't work. Nick, however, is adamant and begs Jennifer to give him a chance. Jennifer ultimately relents, and they begin a secret relationship.

Bill and Susan are preparing for a weekend getaway when Bill's parents inform Susan that they can't stay with Jennifer over the weekend. Not trusting Jennifer to be on her best behavior while at home by herself, Bill tries to cancel the trip. Susan tells Bill to give Jennifer a chance to redeem herself and to lay off her, reminding Bill that he was "ten times worse" than Jennifer was when he was her age, and that they need this trip so that they can have 'a break' from being parents. Bill begrudgingly allows Jennifer to stay home alone and they go on the trip.

Jennifer goes to Nick's grandmother's house, where he shows her his grandfather's World War II Luger pistol. Jennifer, despite proclaiming that she "doesn't like guns," looks on at the weapon with intrigue. She then goes on a date with Nick, jaunting around various parts of town together. Jennifer brings Nick back to her house, where she gives him her father's watch (but lies and says it's her grandfather's). Nick expands on the story of the fight he was jailed for and hopes Jennifer doesn't see him differently; to which Jennifer responds that she doesn't and still desires to be with him. They end up having sex in her parents' bedroom that night.

Bill and Susan unexpectedly arrive home from their weekend getaway early, and Bill enters the master bedroom and finds her and Nick in bed. He chases Nick out of the house; afterwards, he grounds Jennifer for the rest of the school year, forbids her from using the car or hanging out with her friends, and announces that her mother will take her to and from school from now on. Jennifer calls Nick to come pick her up and she sneaks out of the house; before she does, she looks in her bedroom mirror at her 'black eye,' which is, in actuality, makeup she put on to make it appear as if her father hit her.

Jennifer and Nick meet up that night, and Jennifer feigns being hurt because of her 'black eye.' Nick is furious and exclaims that Jennifer's father has no right to hit her, and insists that Jennifer will be staying with him tonight instead of at her parents' house; Jennifer protests and says that she doesn't know what to do, but she doesn't want to lose Nick. Nick states that he'll make Bill listen to him. Jennifer sneaks back in through her bedroom window, where Karen leaves a message on her answering machine telling her to spill the details about her dalliance with Nick. Jennifer is confronted by Susan, who had been waiting in Jennifer's bedroom the entire time. Susan tells Jennifer that she is just as disapproving of Nick and her overall behavior as her father is and that she has "had it" with Jennifer's disobedience; she calls Jennifer "selfish, deceitful, and disrespectful," and informs her that after tonight, no longer will she be protecting Jennifer—which only makes Jennifer resent her parents more. Jennifer writes in her diary that Nick—along with her best friend, Karen—is "so easy to fool."

Nick visits Jennifer's house in an attempt to apologize for the night before and proclaims his love for her, but Bill doesn’t accept his apology nor does he validate their relationship and instructs him to leave. Infuriated, Nick confronts Bill about his harsh treatment of Jennifer, "warning" him to stop mistreating her or there'll be consequences. Bill responds by threatening to turn Nick in for statutory rape, and threatening to "kick his ass" if he doesn't get lost. Nick insists that Bill won't be able to keep him away from Jennifer despite, to which Bill responds that he'll see about that. Nick leaves a message on Jennifer's answering machine stating that he's not intimidated by Bill's threats; that he's in love with Jennifer, and he'll do whatever it takes to be with her at any cost. The next morning, Bill finds his car vandalized and contacts the police. Nick is questioned, but denies knowledge of the incident.

After overhearing her parents discussing how to deal with her, with her mother suggesting they send her away to live with Bill's parents while Bill considers using his police contacts to keep Nick away from her, Jennifer sneaks out of the house once again using Karen as a cover, then goes to Nick's. Jennifer elicits Nick's sympathy and plays into his belief that her dad hits her by displaying another fake bruise created with makeup on her arm. Using the fact that her father would "find [them] and kill [them]" if she left her parents' and moved in with Nick and the purported "abuse" as reasoning, she convinces him to get his grandfather's Luger and kill her parents in order for the two of them to finally be together. Jennifer sneaks off school property with Karen's car and meets up with Nick in a remote location to plan out the murder. They suggest the idea to stage it as a robbery and steal some jewelry. Nick is hesitant about actually doing this, but Jennifer convinces him it's the only way they're able to be together. They test-fire the Luger in the woods. In the meantime, Jennifer creates a diversion by lying to her friends that she and Nick have broken up; she also presents herself to Bill and Susan as their idea of a model teenager. Fooled by Jennifer's new act, they allow her to go to a slumber party with Karen and Bobbi. Later that night, Jennifer sneaks away from the slumber party and meets up with Nick, who's driving his grandfather's automobile in order to avoid his own being seen leaving the scene of the murder, to execute the plan.

Once they reach the Stanton house, Nick once again has second thoughts and tries to back out, but after Jennifer insistently pleads with him to do it, to "fight for their love," he shoots and kills the couple in their sleep. Trish Winkler arrives and informs Jennifer, Karen, and Bobbi that Jennifer's parents have been murdered; Jennifer feigns being distraught. The day after the killings, Jennifer goes to Brad's house and seeks out his comfort, revealing that she never loved Nick and in fact, the entire plan was carried out so that she could be with Brad again without her parents' interference all along.

The police convene on the Stanton home, where Detectives Becker and Daniels question Jennifer along with her paternal grandparents. Jennifer feigns complete ignorance of the murders, insisting that she has no idea who could've possibly done this. The detectives question her about Nick, and Jennifer lies, saying he wasn't a serious boyfriend, only a guy she went out with "a couple of times." Becker buys Jennifer's story, and reveals the prior acrimonious connection between Bill Stanton and Nick, but Daniels is immediately suspicious and suspects she knows more than she let on. Becker scoffs away Daniels' suspicions, insisting that "America's Sweetheart" wouldn't commit such a heinous crime. Jennifer meets with Nick in an isolated location later that evening and discusses the police presence surrounding the murder and the focus on him as a suspect, with Jennifer affirming that she told the police nothing of either of their involvement and that they must stick together moving forward. The detectives interrogate Nick at his home and discover Jennifer's father's ("grandfather's") watch; they make it clear to Nick that he is the foremost and number-one suspect. Nick has his ailing grandmother, Marjorie, provide him an alibi for that night. Nick later covertly observes Jennifer at the Stantons' funeral, spotting her in an affectionate embrace with Brad.

Bill's mother and father, Rose and Harold Stanton, offer for Jennifer to stay with them in the meantime, but Trish and Karen Winkler step in and offer for Jennifer to move in with them instead. Karen and Brad promise to take care of Jennifer and "never let her out of [their] sight." Jennifer is getting ready for a date with Brad at Karen's when Karen informs her that a police detective called, stating he wanted to talk to her. Jennifer steps outside to wait for Brad when she sees Nick parked on the curb of the Winkler home. Nick admonishes Jennifer for not calling him back, to which Jennifer responds that she couldn't due to the overwhelming police presence. Jennifer lies to Nick that the police are going to show up at Karen's at any minute (when, in actuality, it'll be Brad who shows up) and so he must leave. Nick confronts Jennifer about her and Brad at the funeral and asks who he was, and Jennifer lies, stating that Brad is her cousin. Jennifer is adamant that she and Nick stick together despite the entire situation, and persuades him to leave immediately. Brad's SUV drives up and Jennifer lies that it's "the police detective." Nick departs at the same time that Brad arrives, and when Brad asks Jennifer who she was talking to, Jennifer lies and states she was giving directions to a motorist who was lost.

While on her date with Brad, she calls the police anonymously from a payphone and tips them off to the location of the Luger. Brad notices her on the payphone, and Jennifer lies and says she was talking to her grandmother. The police find the gun and subsequently arrest Nick. Jennifer and Brad have sex in his car that night. The police interrogate Nick and lay out their evidence: his prints all over the firearm, Bill Stanton's watch, and bullets matching those which were used in the murders. Becker is harsh on Nick, while a still-suspecting Daniels gently tries to get Nick to admit that Jennifer convinced him to do it; however, Nick refuses to betray Jennifer and says nothing. Becker and Daniels, who's nevertheless convinced Jennifer is involved, go to the Winkler home to question Jennifer.

The detectives inform Jennifer that Nick has been arrested and she feigns astonishment. Jennifer puts on an all-star performance, producing a tape recording of Nick's earlier answering machine message declaring her love for her, and proffers up a clear-cut motive for the murders: that Nick was angry at her parents for not letting him see her. The performance halfway fools the detectives, with Daniels remarking, "If she is involved... she's good."

Meanwhile, Karen becomes suspicious of Jennifer's possible involvement moving forward; she becomes uneasy at how cheery and unconcerned Jennifer appears to be following her parents' brutal murders, and she finds a bullet matching the murder bullets in her own car from when Jennifer had earlier borrowed it. Among Jennifer's things, she finds handwritten stationery proving that Jennifer had been the one who wrote the forged love letters that previously implicated Emma in cheating on Brad. Jennifer later leaves for her date with Brad.

Back at home, Karen finds Jennifer's diary in between her mattress, and reads it. It reveals the earlier entry Jennifer had written about Karen and Nick being easy to fool, and also reveals Jennifer's written confession to the murders, where she remarked that Nick had "frozen" during the commission of the crime and that he was a "loser," stating that she "practically had to kill them [herself]." Jennifer also rejoices triumphantly over finally being back together with Brad in the diary. After discovering this, a horrified Karen promptly leaves at the same time that Jennifer arrives back at the Winklers'.

Karen goes to visit Nick in jail, and she informs him that Jennifer set him up so that she could be with Brad. She implies that Jennifer had been the one to vandalize her own father's car, and reveals that Jennifer's "bruises" inflicted by Bill were made with makeup and that, in fact, her father never laid a hand on her. Nick refuses to believe it, and Karen leaves, determined to find evidence exposing Jennifer's culpability. Jennifer is revealed to have followed Karen to the penitentiary and gets wind of Karen's motivations. Jennifer, herself visiting Nick in jail under the guise of "needing to look [her parents' killer] in the eyes," insists to Nick that they're partners in crime and promises that she told the police nothing. When Nick reveals that Karen came by, and that Karen told him she'd read Jennifer's diary containing her written confession, Jennifer lets her mask slip and she dramatically pins the murders entirely on Nick and yells at him, directly in earshot of Becker. Upset, he admits to the police in a taped confession that he killed Bill and Susan, but that it was Jennifer's idea.

Jennifer arrives back at the Winkler house to find the police executing a search warrant for her diary. Karen orders Jennifer to move out of her home, berating her for being a murderer and saying that the Stantons were her parents. Karen hopes the diary will be of help to Nick. Unbeknownst to Karen and Nick, however, Jennifer had produced a fake diary whose entries falsely claimed Nick abused and harassed her instead of the murder confession. Karen later breaks into the Stanton home and fails to find Jennifer's actual diary. Jennifer later burns the pages of her real diary in which she confessed to the murders. Karen also finds her purse containing the bullet from her own car she'd hidden away emptied, suggesting Jennifer had gotten to it. Karen tries going to the police with this evidence but they refuse to believe her, and Becker threatens to have her charged with obstruction of justice if she continues on her crusade.

At Nick's murder trial, Jennifer perjuriously testifies that Nick harassed her. Jennifer confronts Karen in the courthouse bathroom during jury deliberation and threatens to implicate her in the murders if she doesn't back off. Nick is found guilty of first-degree murder. Jennifer moves back into her parents' home, concealing the fact she'd been ousted from Karen's from her grandparents, and prepares a dinner date with Brad, complete with champagne and candlelight. Jennifer intends on having sex with Brad, with just the two of them in the house, but Brad coaxes her to let him drive her out instead. Jennifer is confused, but nonetheless acquiesces to Brad's request. Brad informs her that he knows—due to Karen telling him—that she masterminded the murder of her parents for him, and he says that he loves her, he has a newfound appreciation for their relationship, and he wants to be with her forever because of it. Jennifer feigns ignorance and bewilderment at first, but Brad tells her that if their relationship is going to be serious, she must be completely candid with him; ultimately, she admits that she killed her parents for him. Eventually, it's revealed that Brad is wearing a wire and he got Jennifer's confession on tape, and he'd lured her out to a sting operation that had been orchestrated by the police and Karen. Jennifer tries to run, but she's stopped by the cops, who finally arrest her.

An epilogue reveals that Jennifer Stanton was tried as a juvenile and will be released at age 21, while Nick Ryan is still in prison.

== Cast ==
- Melissa Joan Hart as Jennifer "Jen" Stanton
- Daniel Baldwin as William "Bill" Stanton
- Isabella Hofmann as Susan Stanton
- Jeremy Jordan as Nicholas "Nick" Ryan
- Meadow Sisto as Karen Winkler
- Kurt Fuller as Detective Becker
- David Lascher as Brad
- Eric Laneuville as Detective Daniels
- Rasool Jahan as Bobbi
- Deborah Hobart as Trish Winkler
- Collin Wilcox Paxton as Rose Stanton
- Erica Galadon as Emma Thomas
- Edith Ivey as Marjorie Ryan

== Reception ==
Variety found that "Production is handsome and homey, and designer Phillip M. Leonard has infused a comfortable atmosphere with L.A. locales to back the telepic's edgy story. Joao R. Fernandes' lensing, Sonny Baskin's surefire editing are pluses; Gary Chang's bizarre title music jars — probably intentionally. Telefilm's a good romp for kids mulling doing away with their parents — or at least it's a good warning."

A review at The Movie Scene stated it was a "pleasant surprise as for a mid 90s TV movie based on a true story it is far more entertaining than the norm."

Hart's performance was noted by various reviewers.
