= The Dark Side of the Moon (1990 film) =

1990 film

- Directed by: D.J. Webster
- Written by: Carey Hayes; Chad Hayes
- Produced by: Keith Walley; D.J. Webster
- Starring: Robert Sampson; Will Bledsoe; Joe Turkel; Camilla More; John Diehl; Wendy MacDonald; Alan Blumenfeld
- Cinematography: Russ T. Alsobrook
- Edited by: John A. O'Connor; Peter Teschner
- Music by: Philip Davies; Mark Ryder
- Distributed by: Trimark Pictures
- Release date: May 30, 1990
- Country: United States
- Language: English

The Dark Side of the Moon is a 1990 direct-to-video science fiction horror film. It was directed by D.J. Webster from the screenplay by brothers Chad and Carey Hayes.

== Plot ==
In the near future, a maintenance vehicle is orbiting the Earth on a mission to repair nuclear-armed satellites. Suddenly, the crew experiences a mysterious, inexplicable power failure that cannot be accounted for. As the ship grows colder, they find themselves drifting toward the dark side of the Moon. An old NASA shuttle, the Discovery, drifts toward them, although NASA has not been operating for 30 years.

Two of the crew members board the ship, hoping to salvage parts to repair their ship, but instead they find a dead body. The mission records of the crew's own ship indicate that the shuttle they have found disappeared in the Bermuda Triangle many years before. The area in space the shuttle is found in corresponds to the earthbound Bermuda Triangle.

As they attempt to solve this mystery, it quickly becomes apparent that a malevolent force has been waiting on the NASA shuttle, using the aforesaid dead body as its host. It now begins to stalk the crew members one at a time. As they fight the force, it becomes apparent they are facing the devil.

With time, air and power running out, the captain decides to make the ultimate sacrifice.

== Cast ==
- Robert Sampson as Flynn Harding
- Will Bledsoe as Giles Stewart
- Joe Turkel as Paxton Warner
- Camilla More as Lesli
- John Diehl as Philip Jennings
- Wendy MacDonald as Alex McInny
- Alan Blumenfeld as Dreyfus Steiner

== Release ==
The film was released on VHS by Vidmark Entertainment on May 30, 1990.

== Reception ==
Creature Feature gave the movie 3.5 out of 5 stars, finding the movie intriguing, taut and well made.
