= First Target =

- Film poster
- Genre: Action
- Written by: Carey Hayes; Chad Hayes
- Directed by: Armand Mastroianni
- Starring: Daryl Hannah; Doug Savant; Gregory Harrison
- Music by: Louis Febre
- Countries of origin: Canada; United States
- Original language: English

Production
- Executive producer: Tom Patricia
- Producer: Preston Fischer
- Production location: Vancouver
- Cinematography: Thomas Burstyn
- Editor: Peter V. White
- Running time: 93 minutes
- Production companies: Columbia TriStar International Television; KirchMedia; Lions Gate Television; Mandalay Television
- Budget: $4,000,000 (estimated)

Original release
- Network: TBS Superstation
- Release: October 15, 2000

Related
- First Daughter (1999); First Shot (2002)

First Target is a 2000 American-Canadian made-for-television action-thriller film and a sequel to First Daughter (1999) with Daryl Hannah taking over the lead role of Agent Alex McGregor from Mariel Hemingway. The film co-stars Doug Savant and Gregory Harrison, reprising their roles of Grant Coleman and President Jonathan Hayes. The film aired on October 15, 2000 on TBS Superstation. It was followed in 2002 by First Shot with Hemingway returning.

== Plot ==
The Secret Service attempt to prevent an elaborately plotted assassination attempt on the President.

Secret Service Agent Alex McGregor is charged with protecting President Jonathan Hayes who is facing problems with a powerful group represented by his Vice-President of the United States, and entrepreneur Senator Jack "J.P." Hunter who helped him win the election. Alex's fiancée Grant Coleman is now close friends with the President after helping save Jess' life after the kidnapping, and intends to marry Alex.

The conspirators intend to assassinate the President while in Seattle to inaugurate the cable wire transportation Skytran and they hire professional killer/seductress Nina Stahl and her hacker brother Evan.

With part of the Secret Service compromised and serving the purposes of the Vice-President, Alex faces difficulties protecting the President.

== Cast ==
- Daryl Hannah as Secret Service Agent Alex McGregor
- Doug Savant as Grant Coleman
- Gregory Harrison as President Jonathan Hayes
- Ken Camroux as Vice President
- Brandy Ledford as Secret Service Agent Kelsey Innes
- Peter Flemming as Stewart McCall
- Gary Bakewell as Ryan Nicholson
- Tom Butler as Senator Jack "J.P." Hunter
- Robert Wisden as Brinkman
- Jason Schombing as Jack Bryant
- Ona Grauer as Nina Stahl
- Aaron Grain as Evan Stahl
- Terrence Kelly as Clay

== Legacy ==
Quentin Tarantino got the idea to cast Daryl Hannah in Kill Bill after seeing First Target on cable television.
