= George Robinson (actor) =

British actor

- Born: George Ross Robinson; 12 September 1997 (age 29); Nottingham, England
- Occupation: Actor
- Years active: 2020–present
- Family: Bobby Ross (grandfather)

George Ross Robinson (born 12 September 1997) is an English actor. He is known for his role as Isaac Goodwin in the Netflix series Sex Education.

== Life and career ==
Robinson was born in Nottingham to parents Simon and Gill and grew up in Maxey, a village near Peterborough. He has a younger brother Edward "Eddie". They both attended Stamford School, and the family moved closer to Stamford in 2015. Robinson became interested in acting at 13.

When he was 17, Robinson went on a school rugby tour to South Africa. On 27 July 2015, he had a severe spinal neck injury attempting a tackle whilst playing against D.F. Malan High School in Bellville near Cape Town. He was taken to the intensive care unit at Melomed Bellville Private Hospital, where he was operated on and stayed for 37 days. He was visited by Huw Jones. After being weaned off the ventilator, Robinson was transported back to England via air ambulance. He spent an additional 5 weeks at Addenbrooke's Hospital in Cambridge followed by 10 months in rehabilitation at the Princess Royal Spinal Unit in Sheffield.

As a result of the accident, Robinson is tetraplegic and uses a power-assisted manual wheelchair. The accident received media coverage and attention from public figures in and out of the rugby community. A fundraiser, "#TeamGeorge", was established by family friends, the proceeds of which went towards Robinson's equipment and long-term care.

With support from Stamford, Robinson was able to return to finish his secondary education at 19 with an unconditional offer to the University of Birmingham. He paused his studies in Philosophy when he was cast as a series regular in the second season of the Netflix comedy-drama Sex Education. His character Isaac's disability was written around the actor's real life one, and Robinson was included in the creative process.

Robinson spoke on a panel on disability representation and treatment in the workplace at the 2021 Edinburgh TV Festival. That same year, he appeared in a two episode arc of the Channel 5 series Dalgliesh and was selected to be on the UK BAFTA Breakthrough list.

Robinson is set to feature in an educational film for the charity Back Up Trust. Robinson will also play the lead (John McClamrock) in the film Still Life, based on an award-winning Texas Monthly non-fiction article of the same name written by Skip Hollandsworth in 2009, about John McClamrock and his mother Ann.

== Filmography ==
| Year | Title | Role | Notes |
|---|---|---|---|
| 2020–2023 | Sex Education | Isaac Goodwin | Seasons 2–4 |
| 2021 | Dalgliesh | Henry Carwardine | Season 1, episodes 3 and 4 |
| 2022 | Perfect | Liam Edwards | Pilot (broadcast) |
| 2024 | Silo | Mark Chambers | Seasons 2-3 |
| 2025 | My Fault: London | JP | Amazon Prime film |
| 2025 | The War Between the Land and the Sea | Steve Chesney | 5 episodes |

== Audio ==
- Life Hacks for BBC Radio One
