= McClamrock =

McClamrock is a surname. Notable people with the surname include:

- John McClamrock (1956–2008), American football player and tetraplegic
- Ron McClamrock, American philosophy academic
