= Melrose Place season 2 =

Melrose Place
- Season 2
- DVD cover
- Starring: Josie Bissett Thomas Calabro Doug Savant Grant Show Andrew Shue Courtney Thorne-Smith Daphne Zuniga Special guest star: Heather Locklear as Amanda
- No. of episodes: 32

Release
- Original network: Fox
- Original release: September 8, 1993 – May 18, 1994

Season chronology
- ← Previous; Season 1 Next → Season 3

The second season of Melrose Place, an American television series, premiered on Fox on September 8, 1993. The season two finale aired on May 18, 1994, after 32 episodes.

The season was produced by Chip Hayes, supervising producer Charles Pratt Jr, co-executive producer Frank South and executive producers Aaron Spelling, E. Duke Vincent and Darren Star.

== Storylines ==
As the second season begins, Michael is divorced from Jane and begins a relationship with Kimberly while having a fling with Jane's younger sister Sydney (Laura Leighton), a prostitute and stripper. While waitressing at Shooters, Sydney is introduced by a co-worker to Lauren Ethridge (Kristian Alfonso), a Hollywood madam who recruits Sydney into her call girl ring. Although Sydney quits, she is arrested for solicitation. Michael bails her out of jail, blackmailing her to break up Jane and her latest love interest, divorce lawyer, Robert Wilson (Steven Eckholdt).

A drunken Michael crashes his car (apparently fatally injuring Kimberly), but escapes manslaughter charges when Matt alters his blood-alcohol test results at the hospital. Sydney uses this knowledge to blackmail Michael into marrying her, despite Jane's objections. Her plans are foiled when Kimberly reappears alive and well, saying that her mother lied about her death to keep Michael away. Kimberly is more ruthless and unstable as a result of brain surgery and the accident. She reclaims Michael, revealing her desire to kill him; removing her wig in front of a mirror, a gruesome scar from the accident is seen.

Sydney takes over Lauren Ethridge's call-girl ring while Lauren is in jail. When Lauren is released, she abducts Sydney and demands the profits from her escort service while she was incarcerated. Sydney works as a stripper and a prostitute to raise the money. She is attacked on the street by other prostitutes; in the hospital, Kimberly recruits her for her scheme to kill Michael.

Early in the season Matt loses his job when the halfway house closes, and Michael finds him a job in the social-services department of Wilshire Memorial. He befriends a Russian doctor, Katya Petrova (Beata Pozniak). Katya is attracted to Matt, who tells her he is gay. When she is in danger of deportation, he offers to marry her so her five-year-old daughter Nikki (Mara Wilson) can remain in the U.S. However, Matt's "marriage" now hampers his love life. When Katya returns to Russia to visit her family she decides to stay and sends for her daughter, freeing an emotional Matt from their arrangement. He becomes romantically involved with Jeffrey Lindley (Jason Beghe), a closeted U.S. Navy officer, although he disagrees with Jeffrey's secrecy. Although Matt persuades Jeffrey to come out, he regrets it when Jeffrey is discharged from the service and leaves town.

Jake buys a struggling motorcycle-repair shop, which soon burns down in a fire accidentally started by Amanda. Jake never discovers that Amanda is indirectly responsible for the fire, and ends his romance with Jo. Jake becomes romantically involved with Amanda, whose father Palmer Woodward (Wayne Tippit) offers him a job as a mechanic. He learns that Palmer is involved in a scheme to sell reproduced cars as originals, and is forced by the FBI to help it arrest Palmer.

Jo becomes romantically involved with her former high-school flame, ex-convict Reed Carter (James Wilder), who smuggles drugs on boats he works on. When she discovers his stash, he kidnaps, rapes and tortures her on the boat in the Pacific Ocean. Jo kills Reed to escape his abuse, later learning that she is pregnant with his child.

Alison and Billy's romance has its ups and downs. She has a relationship with Steve McMillian (Parker Stevenson), a new client at D & D Advertising after Amanda becomes senior vice-president. Although Alison tries to set up Jo with Steve, Steve leaves to work in Europe and Alison and Billy reconcile. Billy rises through the ranks at Escapade, moving to New York to work. This strains his relationship with Alison, and he returns to Los Angeles to propose to her.

Struggling in her romance with Jake and running D & D Advertising, Amanda has an uncomfortable reunion with her estranged mother Hilary Michaels (Linda Gray). Hilary is CEO of Models Inc., which would spawn a spinoff series. Jo meets Sarah Owens (Cassidy Rae), a model at Hilary's agency, whom she helps end an abusive relationship. Hilary asks Amanda to employ her fiancé, Chas (Jeff Kaake), at D & D and Amanda fires him after he harasses her sexually. However, Chas files a sexual-harassment lawsuit against Amanda and her company. Hilary learns the truth about Chas, testifying against him and ending the case in Amanda's favor. However, Amanda cannot forgive her mother and Hilary returns to the modeling agency.

Alison and Billy become engaged, and plan a wedding in the building's courtyard. On her wedding day, when her father hugs her she experiences flashbacks of his molesting her as a child. Alison flees through a window and goes to San Francisco to see her sister, Meredith, who was also abused by their father. The season ends with Kimberly (in a short blonde wig) running Michael down in Jane's car, followed by Jane's wrongful arrest.

== Cast ==
=== Main cast members ===
In alphabetical order

- Josie Bissett as Jane Mancini
- Thomas Calabro as Michael Mancini
- Doug Savant as Matt Fielding
- Grant Show as Jake Hanson
- Andrew Shue as Billy Campbell
- Courtney Thorne-Smith as Alison Parker
- Daphne Zuniga as Jo Reynolds

=== Special guest star ===
- Heather Locklear as Amanda Woodward

=== Recurring guest stars ===
- Marcia Cross as Dr. Kimberly Shaw
- William R. Moses as Keith Gray
- Laura Leighton as Sydney Andrews
- Beata Poźniak as Dr. Katya Petrova
- Steven Eckholdt as Robert Wilson
- Mara Wilson as Nikki Petrova
- Parker Stevenson as Steve McMillan
- Wayne Tippit as Palmer Woodward
- Melanie Smith as Celia Morales
- Meg Wittner as Nancy Donner
- Gina Gershon as Ellen
- Kristian Alfonso as Lauren Ethridge
- Janet Carroll as Marion Shaw
- James Wilder as Reed Carter
- Stanley Kamel as Bruce Teller
- Jason Beghe as Jeffrey Lindley
- Carmen Argenziano as Dr. Stanley Levin
- Gail Strickland as Katherine Andrews
- Dorothy Fielding as Alison's mother
- Monte Markham as John Parker
- Linda Gray as Hillary Michaels
- Jeff Kaake as Chas Russell
- Cassidy Rae as Sarah Owens
- Andrew Williams as Chris Marchette
- Tracy Nelson as Meredith Parker

== Episodes ==
No. overall	No. in season	Title	Directed by	Written by	Original release date	Prod. code	U.S. viewers (millions)
33	1	"Much Ado About Everything"	Nancy Malone	Charles Pratt, Jr.	September 8, 1993	2393033	14.7
Amanda throws herself a housewarming party, but forces Alison to work late so that she can hit on Billy. Alison continues to receive threatening letters and phone calls. Keith picks her up at work and takes her to the party. He slips something into her drink and tries to take advantage of her, but Billy interrupts. Keith purposely injures his head and claims that he was attacked. Billy doesn't seem to believe him. In order to dodge suspicion, Keith pays a homeless man to make an obscene phone call to Alison while Keith is present. Jane files for divorce. Michael moves in with Kimberly. Jake brings a bimbo to the housewarming party to make Jo jealous, and Jo agrees to live with him. They argue about everything. Matt loses his job when the halfway house shuts down. Heather Locklear is made a series regular (or rather, permanent Special Guest Star) as Amanda Woodward.
34	2	"A Long Night's Journey"	Charles Correll	Frank South	September 15, 1993	2393034	12.9
Billy remains wary of Alison's relationship with Keith. Alison agrees to drive Keith to the airport. When she drops by his hotel room to pick him up, he tries to rape her. She kicks him in the groin and escapes. Keith is arrested, but released due to lack of evidence. Billy follows him back to Seattle. Jo fears that Amanda has set her sights on Jake. Michael convinces Kimberly to lie about their affair in court. Jane throws the wedding china at Michael. Sydney returns to L.A., and Michael seeks her friendship.
35	3	"Revenge"	James Frawley	Darren Star	September 22, 1993	2393035	16.0
Billy shows up at Keith's work site and assaults him. After Alison tells Keith that she hates him, he commits suicide while on the phone with her. Alison begins drinking and is sent home from work. Amanda tries to convince Jake to model for a beer campaign. Sydney caters to Michael's every whim, despite a warning from Jane. Matt is hired by the hospital's social services department.
36	4	"Fire Power"	Barbara Amato	Kimberly Costello	September 29, 1993	2393036	11.5
Amanda threatens to fire Alison when her drinking gets out of hand. Billy forces her to confront her guilt over Keith's suicide. Amanda hires Jo for an evening photo shoot, then takes Jake to dinner to discuss "business." On her way out of the bike shop, she accidentally knocks over a blowtorch. The shop burns to the ground. Jo is placed in danger because she believed Jake was still inside the building. Jake is suspected of arson and insurance fraud. Sam returns to town for a construction job and has dinner with Jane. Sydney tells Michael about the date; and he confronts Sam at the job site, much to Kimberly's annoyance. A female doctor has a crush on Matt.
37	5	"Of Bikes and Men"	James Whitmore Jr.	Allison Robbins	October 6, 1993	2393037	12.8
Jake realizes that he accidentally burned the shop down. He flies into a rage and trashes Jo's apartment. She throws him out. He later breaks up with her for failing to trust him. Alison tags along when Billy travels to a beautiful hotel to interview the reclusive owner. The man's daughter gropes Billy under the table during dinner. Michael accuses Jane of infidelity. He shows up at Jane's favorite supermarket to spite her, so she rams her cart into him and dumps spaghetti sauce on his head. Kimberly breaks down during a court hearing and admits her affair with Michael. Matt tells his friend Katya that he is gay, and learns that she has a five-year-old daughter.
38	6	"Hot and Bothered"	Paul Lazarus	Dee Johnson	October 13, 1993	2393038	13.2
Billy and Alison cannot get Jake and Jo back together. Amanda forces Jake to work with Jo on a photo shoot, where they bicker. The Mancinis' divorce is finalized. Michael fears that Jane is stealing his friends, so he throws a party at the beach house. Jane goes drinking with Alison and Jo; then sleeps with her lawyer, Robert. Kimberly is irritated when a drunken Michael flirts with every woman at the party. Sydney passes out drunk and spends the night on Michael and Kimberly's couch. Jake tries to invite himself to Amanda's apartment, but she slaps him. Katya asks Matt to marry her so that she and her daughter Nikki won't be deported.
39	7	"Flirting With Disaster"	Bethany Rooney	Charles Pratt, Jr.	October 20, 1993	2393039	11.7
Jane throws Sydney out, but Amanda leases her an apartment in the building. Alison travels to a ranch to make a presentation to millionaire computer exec Steve McMillan, but it does not go as planned. Matt decides to marry Katya. Michael sleeps with Sydney while Kimberly is out of town at a conference.
40	8	"No Bed of Roses"	Nancy Malone	Frank South	October 27, 1993	2393040	12.7
Amanda's father offers Jake a high-paying job at his car restoration business. He refuses, but changes his mind after sleeping with Amanda. Jo is devastated by the news, but cheers up when Steve asks her on a date. Sydney prevents Michael from breaking up with her by threatening to expose their affair. Jane decides to take things slowly with Robert. Doug Savant does not appear in this episode.
41	9	"Married to It"	Marty Pasetta, Jr.	Darren Star	November 3, 1993	2393041	11.8
Sydney gets a waitress job at Shooters. Kimberly catches Michael in bed with Sydney. She tells Jane, and says that she did her a favor by breaking up her marriage because "that man is sick." Kimberly moves out when Michael refuses to leave the beach house. A drunken Michael interrupts Jane's dinner with Robert's parents. Matt gets a date, but is distracted when Katya and an ailing Nikki have to move into his apartment to fool an immigration official. Alison is jealous of Steve's relationship with Jo.
42	10	"The Tangled Web"	Chip Chalmers	Charles Pratt, Jr.	November 10, 1993	2393042	15.4
Jo, Alison and Billy go to Steve's ranch for the weekend. Billy is unhappy about Steve's attraction to Alison. Jo and Steve break up because she hasn't gotten over Jake. Jo confronts Alison after learning of Steve's feelings for her. Steve and Alison later share a kiss. Jake suspects that Palmer is engaging in fraud. Kimberly refuses to take Michael back. Doug Savant and Josie Bissett do not appear in this episode.
43	11	"Collision Course"	Richard Lang	Frank South	November 17, 1993	2393043	16.0
Michael convinces Kimberly to have dinner with him. When she rejects his marriage proposal, he becomes very drunk. Kimberly changes her mind during the drive home, but Michael loses control of the car during their celebratory kiss. The car flips off an embankment, leaving Michael paralyzed and Kimberly in a coma. Michael blames Syd for the accident. The police suspect that Michael was driving under the influence. He pleads with Matt to change the results of his blood alcohol test. One of Sydney's co-workers takes her to a party. She makes a date with a director, unaware that he is under the impression that she is a hooker. Jo gives Alison the cold shoulder, and warns her that she is on the verge of destroying her relationship with Billy. Kristian Alfonso (Lauren) is best known for her portrayal of Hope Williams Brady on the NBC soap Days of Our Lives.
44	12	"Cold Turkey"	Paul Lazarus	Kimberly Costello	November 24, 1993	2393044	12.1
Alison has to miss Thanksgiving dinner when Amanda sends her to San Francisco for a presentation on Steve's account. Billy, aware that Steve will try to romance her, threatens to break up with Alison if she makes the trip. She ignores his ultimatum. A suddenly sympathetic Amanda urges Billy not to give up on Alison. He calls her room, but hangs up when Steve answers the phone. The FBI orders Jake to assist them with a sting on Palmer. Jake skips Thanksgiving dinner (or in Jo's words, "Amanda's tribute to the men in her life") to hang out on the stairs and talk with Jo. Jane offers Sydney a holiday truce, but Syd decides to dine with a madam named Lauren and her girls. Kimberly's mother has her daughter shipped home to Cleveland.
45	13	"Duet for One"	Victoria Hochberg	Allison Robbins	December 1, 1993	2393045	14.1
Michael learns that Kimberly has died. He is transferred to a rehab hospital, but manages to convince Jane to take him in. Robert is enraged by this development. Billy breaks up with Alison and moves in with Jake. Sydney becomes a prostitute. Katya leaves Nikki with Matt as she returns to Russia to care for her mother.
46	14	"Strange Bedfellows"	Nancy Malone	Dee Johnson	December 15, 1993	2393046	13.1
Alison learns that Steve is leaving for Europe in a few days. He gives her a new jeep and confesses his feelings. Alison joins him for a weekend on his ranch, but suddenly dumps him because she wants to reconcile with Billy. Billy's bitterness about Alison clouds his judgment on a writing assignment. Jake forces Palmer to confess to fraud on tape. Palmer convinces Amanda that Jake set him up, so she dumps Jake and plots to evict him. Michael falls out of bed, and Sydney refuses to help him until he apologizes for his past actions. Jo rejects Jake's thinly veiled advances, but Billy and Amanda sleep together. Doug Savant does not appear in this episode.
47	15	"Under the Mistletoe"	Chip Chalmers	Charles Pratt, Jr.	December 22, 1993	2393047	13.9
Billy manages to sneak out of Amanda's apartment without detection. Alison asks him for a reconciliation, but he turns her down. Matt promises Nikki a Christmas party. Billy and Jake look for a tree for the courtyard, and end up running into Jo and Alison. Billy tries to fly home for Christmas, but can't get a flight. He plays Santa at Nikki's party. Alison finds him sneaking a present into her stocking during the night. They apologize and renew their relationship. A temporary nurse prompts Michael to reflect on his behavior. He apologizes to Jane and Robert. Sydney goes to confession and gives up hooking. Nikki returns to Russia.
48	16	"Reunion Blues"	Jefferson Kibbee	Frank South	January 5, 1994	2393048	13.7
Billy tells Amanda that he and Alison are back together. Amanda responds by removing Alison from the Microcomp account because she was romantically involved with the client. Amanda moves forward with her plans to evict Jake, but Jo refuses to testify against him. Amanda relents when she needs Jake's help with a plumbing problem. Palmer confesses his guilt to Amanda and skips town. She goes back to Jake. Jo goes to her ten-year high school reunion and runs into Reed, an old boyfriend who has just been released from prison. He later turns up at her apartment. Michael has a breakthrough at a physical therapy session, and regains the use of his legs. Sydney is busted for prostitution. Michael bails her out and agrees to keep quiet if she helps him break up Jane and Robert. James Wilder (Reed) later played Adam Louder on the Melrose spin-off Models Inc.
49	17	"Michael's Game"	Marty Pasetta, Jr.	Darren Star	January 12, 1994	2393049	15.5
Alison complains to the brass about Amanda's mistreatment of her. After the FBI shows up with questions about her father's disappearance, Amanda is ordered to take a vacation. She heads to Hawaii with Jake, but returns because she fears that Alison is after her job. She goes to Billy and threatens to expose their one-night stand unless he gets Alison to back off. He refuses to cave in, although Alison ends up apologizing to Amanda anyway. Sydney sets up a hooker with an unknowing Robert during a business trip. Jane receives a videotape of the two together and breaks up with Robert. Reed and Jo sleep together. He later decides to start a charter boat service.
50	18	"Arousing Suspicions"	Steve Dubin	Kimberly Costello	January 26, 1994	2393050	14.3
After Michael shuns her, Sydney tells Jane the truth about her involvement with prostitution and Michael's scheme against Robert. Jane blames herself for Sydney's problems, and throws Michael out. Sydney is acquitted because of an incompetent prosecution team. Jo is angry when Reed approaches Amanda as a potential investor in his charter boat service. Jake confronts Reed about his intentions toward the two women in his life. Billy wins a promotion, but learns that the job requires a move to New York. Matt is annoyed by the bizarre behavior of his new love interest. He learns that the man is a closeted Navy officer.
51	19	"The Young Men and the Sea"	Charles Correll	Allison Robbins	February 2, 1994	2393051	13.2
Amanda and Jo invest in Reed's business, and Jake is hired as chief mechanic. Jo displays a lack of trust toward Reed after he leaves a suitcase of personal possessions in her care. Michael becomes addicted to painkillers. Jane files a restraining order against him. She calls the police when Michael shows up at her apartment, but Sydney gives him refuge. After Michael talks Syd into getting him more pills, she finds him passed out on his bathroom floor. Alison refuses to move to New York with Billy, and suggests they try a long-distance relationship. Jeffrey fears that his relationship with Matt could jeopardize his career.
52	20	"Parting Glances"	Bethany Rooney	Dee Johnson	February 9, 1994	2393052	14.5
Jake and Amanda pull out of Reed's business when Jake discovers some inconsistencies in his story, but Jo accuses him of jealousy. Reed picks up a shipment of drugs on the boat while Jo is sleeping on board. When Jo discovers drugs stored in a compartment below deck, Reed rapes and kidnaps her. Sydney overhears a semi-comatose Michael babbling about his plea for Matt to change his blood alcohol results. She lays the groundwork for a blackmail scheme. Frustrated by her inability to get in touch with Billy, Alison flies to New York to surprise him. She is stunned to find him having drinks with another woman. Jeffrey is transferred to the east coast after coming out of the closet.
53	21	"Swept Away"	Nancy Malone	Charles Pratt, Jr.	February 16, 1994	2393053	15.4
Reed plans to start over in Mexico after one last major drug deal. Jo knocks him overboard with a harpoon, but the boat runs out of gas. When Reed climbs on board and holds her at gunpoint, Jo is forced to shoot and kill him. She is arrested when the Coast Guard raids the boat. Alison accepts Billy's explanation about his date, but breaks up with him again when he falsely assumes that she is moving to New York. He follows her back to Los Angeles and surprises her with a marriage proposal. Sydney presents her blackmail demands and moves in with Michael. Lonnie Schuyler, who plays Dr. Dave Smith, later had a recurring role on Models Inc. as Ben, Adam Louder's treacherous drug-dealing sidekick. He then returned to Melrose Place and took on another recurring role, as Matt's boyfriend Alan.
54	22	"With This Ball and Chain"	Jefferson Kibbee	Frank South	February 23, 1994	2393054	12.2
Jo faces murder charges following Reed's death. Jake is angry when Amanda refuses to help Jo because she could be implicated through her financial ties to Reed. She later has a change of heart, hiring her accomplished family attorney to represent Jo and putting the apartment building up as collateral for her bail. The charges are eventually dropped; the D.A. knew that Jo's crime was justifiable homicide, but wanted to press her for information about Reed's associates. Alison accepts Billy's proposal. Billy tells Amanda that he wants to tell Alison about their one-night stand (but doesn't follow through), so Amanda confesses to Jake. At the engagement party, Jake decks Billy after being asked to serve as best man. Amanda explains the situation to Alison. Alison is stunned by the news, but forgives Billy. Sydney decides that she and Michael are getting married.
55	23	"Otherwise Engaged"	Chip Chalmers	Darren Star	March 2, 1994	2393055	17.1
Sydney and Jane get into a catfight in the pool after Syd tries to take Jane's wedding dress (a family heirloom). Their mother comes to town, but cannot talk Syd out of the marriage. Michael and Sydney are married at the beach house, with only Matt in attendance. Inspired by a dream, Michael decides to take Syd on a honeymoon and murder her. Jo learns that she is pregnant with Reed's child, and plans to have an abortion. Amanda is jealous of the amount of time Jake is spending with Jo, until she learns about the pregnancy. Jo decides to have the baby. Billy's co-worker Celia and Alison lay a guilt trip on him until he buys Alison a more expensive engagement ring.
56	24	"Love, Mancini Style"	Charles Correll	Allison Robbins	March 16, 1994	2393056	16.8
Michael attempts to kill Sydney during their honeymoon in the mountains of northern California, but fails twice. Matt pursues them in the hopes of preventing the crime. Michael has the chance to push Syd off a cliff, but cannot go through with it. Sydney vows that he will love her one day. Billy once again tries to mend fences with Jake, who agrees that they can co-exist at the apartment but still considers their friendship over. A guilt-ridden Matt tells Jane that he altered Michael's blood alcohol records after the accident. Jane uses a signed confession from Matt to blackmail Michael and Sydney into staying married. Jo is haunted by visions of Reed, and is angry when she learns that Jake has decided to start a charter service on Reed's boat, the Pretty Lady. He convinces Jo to face her guilt head on, and she visits Reed's grave site to offer her forgiveness. Amanda erupts after seeing Jake comfort Jo. Alison decides that she and Billy won't sleep together again until after the wedding.
57	25	"The Two Mrs. Mancinis"	Marty Pasetta, Jr.	Allison Robbins	March 23, 1994	2393057	15.2
Billy ignores Alison's wishes and tags along when she heads to Wisconsin for her father's fiftieth birthday party. He is furious when Alison refuses to share the news of their engagement. When Alison's ex-boyfriend Adam serenades her during the party, Billy announces the engagement. Adam warns Billy that the Parker family is "weird." Alison is haunted by nightmares after returning to L.A. Jane and Sydney's grandmother dies. Jane learns that she is to inherit $100,000, and decides to start her own design firm. Her plans are complicated when Syd and Michael seek a cut of the money because it is willed to "Dr. and Mrs. Michael Mancini." Michael confronts Matt about his confession to Jane, and they duke it out. Jo's potential romance with a model is quashed when he learns about her pregnancy.
58	26	"In Bed With the Enemy"	Parker Stevenson	Stevie Stern	April 6, 1994	2393058	15.4
Jane struggles with starting up her new company due to her inheritance being frozen. Amanda suggests bringing in an investor and devises a plan for Michael to invest. Jane is initially furious but relents when Amanda points out that the legal costs would leave Sydney and Michael with nothing. Amanda hires a new property manager, Ted, who quickly rubs everyone the wrong way. Alison catches him lurking in her bedroom and later Jake catches him in Amanda's. Finally Amanda fires him but he continues to spy on Amanda via a peephole he drilled in her shower. Jane secretly gets her accountant to cook the books so that she can lower the value of the company and buy out Michael and Sydney. Lauren is arrested and is visited by Sydney, who proposes to take over her territory until she's released.
59	27	"Psycho Therapy"	Charles Correll	Kimberly Costello	April 20, 1994	2393059	15.9
Jake makes amends with Billy before leaving for a weekend fishing trip. Jo discovers that Ted is a peeping tom, and she and Amanda catch him sneaking around in the crawl space above Amanda's apartment. Amanda refuses to allow Jo to call the police until Amanda has tied up Ted and emotionally tortured him. Billy warns Dr. Miller not to interfere in his relationship with Alison. Alison ends their sessions, but not before Dr. Miller makes an astute observation about her relationships with men. Michael learns that Dr. Levin is a client of Sydney's "escort service," and uses this information to blackmail his boss into appointing him chief resident. Michael tells Sydney that he wants to give their marriage a chance. As they kiss on the deck, Kimberly observes them from the beach below.
60	28	"The Bitch Is Back"	Nancy Malone	Frank South	April 27, 1994	2393060	17.5
Michael is astonished when Kimberly pays him a late-night visit. She reveals that she was in a coma for months, and that her mother claimed that she had died to keep Michael away from her. Michael dumps Sydney without explanation. When she brings a police officer to the hospital to have Michael arrested for manslaughter, Kimberly enters the room, prompting Syd to faint. Kimberly is plagued by headaches, and removes a wig in the bathroom to reveal a nasty scar on the side of her head. Amanda fires a model after learning that she is from the agency Models Inc., and is reprimanded by her boss. She reveals that her estranged mother, Hillary Michaels (special guest star Linda Gray), is the head of the agency. Amanda rejects Hillary's overtures, but Jake later convinces her to give her mother a chance. Alison takes back her decree about not sleeping with Billy until their wedding night. Alison's parents hire an obnoxious wedding planner, but Billy and Alison fire her and decide to marry in the courtyard of the apartment building. Linda Gray (Hillary) and Cassidy Rae (Sarah) were cast members on the Melrose spin-off Models Inc. They appeared in five episodes of Melrose Place. In 2009, TV Guide ranked this episode #85 on its list of the 100 Greatest Episodes.
61	29	"Imperfect Strangers"	Chip Chalmers	Dee Johnson	May 4, 1994	2393061	16.2
Kimberly threatens Sydney when she tries to stake her claim on Michael. Syd's business party is crashed by a newly freed Lauren, who breaks their earlier agreement, kidnaps her, and demands $15,000 by the end of the week. When Jane refuses to help her, Sydney takes a job as a stripper. Kimberly is still disturbed by Michael's marriage to Sydney, and makes plans for revenge. Alison is annoyed when Amanda hires her mother's fiancé, Chas. He refuses to take his share of the work, and ingratiates himself with Amanda by helping her smooth things over with Hillary. Alison later catches Amanda and Chas kissing in a conference room. Jo conducts a photo shoot with her model friend, Sarah, aboard the Pretty Lady. They are forced to stay overnight when the boat experiences engine trouble, and Jake and Jo nearly rekindle their romance. Sarah seeks refuge at Jo's apartment after her visiting boyfriend Hank tries to rape her. Hank shows up at Jo's doorstep and tries to abduct Sarah. When Jo steps between them, Hank throws her down the stairs.
62	30	"Devil With the G-String On"	Paul Lazarus	Charles Pratt, Jr.	May 11, 1994	2393062	17.8
Amanda is furious when Jake skips work to hold a bedside vigil for Jo. Jo is not seriously injured, and learns that her baby was unharmed. Billy warns Alison to keep quiet about Amanda's rendezvous with Chas. Jake tracks down Hank at a pool hall and beats him up. He shows up late for dinner with Amanda, sporting a black eye, and storms out when she lambastes him for defending Jo. Michael throws Billy a bachelor party at a strip club, unaware that Sydney is the entertainment. When she sees Michael, she runs out of the club and is fired. A drunken Billy accidentally tells Jake about Amanda and Chas. Jake breaks up with Amanda, who fires Chas and vows to destroy Alison. Jake admits his feelings for Jo, and she agrees to take him back. Kimberly alters the chart of one of Michael's patients, prompting him to unwittingly commit an error that nearly kills the man. He is stripped of the chief resident position. Kimberly bullies Jane into turning over the $5000 in profits she had kept from Michael. She tries to use the money to hire a hit man to kill Michael, but settles on doing the job herself. Sydney goes back to prostitution. Stephanie Romanov, who appears as Teri Spencer, would also become a series regular on the Melrose spin-off Models Inc.
63	31	"Till Death Do Us Part"	Chip Chalmers	Darren Star & Frank South	May 18, 1994	2393063A	19.3
64	32	"Till Death Do Us Part"	Chip Chalmers	Darren Star & Frank South	May 18, 1994	2393063B	19.3
Jo is certain that Amanda will not gracefully bow out of her relationship with Jake. Hillary refuses to believe that Chas tried to seduce Amanda. Chas files a $10 million sexual harassment suit against Amanda, and the agency does not support her. She turns to Jake for consolation. Sydney is assaulted by three hookers when she invades their turf. Kimberly comforts her and pays her rent. She convinces Syd to participate in her plot to kill Michael, and they plan the crime over ice cream. Michael stands in the way of Jane's plans to expand her business. Billy's college friend Rob comes to town to serve as his best man, and gets along well with Matt. Billy is stunned to see them kissing in the courtyard. Jake sleeps with Amanda. Jo catches him coming out of her apartment half-dressed. Jake insists that he doesn't want to reunite with Amanda, but Jo breaks up with him. Amanda tries to make nice with Alison in the hopes of convincing her not to testify on Chas's behalf. Kimberly drugs Michael, and she and Syd leave him in his car with the engine running. However, Jane revives him when she and client Chris Marchette come over to discuss a business deal. Before the wedding, Michael refuses to sign off on Jane's business proposal, so she threatens to kill him. Kimberly steals Jane's car keys. As Alison is about to walk down the aisle, her father's words of reassurance trigger a repressed memory. She realizes that her father molested her during her childhood. He threatens to kill her if she tells anyone. Alison fails to emerge for the ceremony, and Jane and Billy discover that she has fled through the window. She seeks refuge at her sister Meredith's San Francisco home, unaware that her father has followed her. Chas's lawsuit is thrown out after Hillary and a maid overhear him taunt Amanda and admit that his accusations are false. As Michael steps into the hospital parking lot, Kimberly (wearing a short blonde wig) plows into him with Jane's car. Jane is arrested. The scene in which Matt and Rob kissed was edited in the wake of a possible advertiser boycott. Darren Star spoke later to Variety, "We filmed it. The network had the final cut. It was a kiss too far from their point of view. It was a place they didn’t want to go. Twenty years ago, it was verboten. When you watch "I Love Lucy," two married characters were not allowed to share a bed. Network TV has always been archaic and frightened about showing sexuality. That’s always been their biggest taboo. They’ve caught up a lot. It has to stay somewhat relevant to the audience that watches it". Over a month after this episode, Daphne Zuniga and Grant Show would appear briefly in the pilot episode of Models Inc., which aired on June 29, 1994.
