= Crowned and Dangerous =

1997 American television film

- Genre: Crime comedy
- Written by: Alan Hines; Carey W. Hayes; Chad Hayes
- Directed by: Christopher Leitch
- Starring: Yasmine Bleeth; Cassidy Rae; George Eads; Jill Clayburgh; Gates McFadden
- Music by: Starr Parodi; Jeff Eden Fair
- Country of origin: United States
- Original language: English

Production
- Executive producers: Tony Danza; Diana Kerew
- Producer: Rosalie Muskatt
- Cinematography: Robert Primes
- Editor: John Duffy
- Running time: 96 minutes
- Production companies: Columbia TriStar Television; Katie Face Productions; Stu Segall Productions

Original release
- Network: ABC
- Release: September 21, 1997

Crowned and Dangerous is a 1997 American crime comedy television film directed by Christopher Leitch and written by Alan Hines, Carey W. Hayes and Chad Hayes. It stars Yasmine Bleeth, Cassidy Rae, George Eads, Jill Clayburgh and Gates McFadden. The film premiered on September 21, 1997, on ABC.

== Plot ==
Danielle Stevens is a beautiful young woman who lives with her mother Kathy in small-town Madison, Northern California. She is insecure, frustrated, and beautiful. To become famous, Danielle joins beauty pageants under the scrutiny of her stage-mom, who aspired to be a beauty queen herself, but was not supported by her family. As a result, she lives her personal dreams through her daughter.

Danielle competes in Miss Madison, a preliminary to Miss All-Star California, where she has to face her nemesis Shauna Langley, an experienced, beautiful, confident contestant. Danielle's insecurities feed Shauna's wit and she enjoys messing with her and other contestants.

Danielle meets Riley Baxter during one of the rehearsal sessions, a wealthy, handsome, and intelligent young man who is the heir to the Baxter fortune inherited from his late father's hardware business. In the end, Danielle and Shauna have to compete both on and off stage because Riley is the ex-boyfriend of Shauna.

The Miss Madison competition is won by Shauna, while Danielle placed second, earning an invitation to compete in the Queen of Strawberries Festival.

After being crowned Miss Madison, Shauna has a string of bizarre accidents, one of which leads to her breaking a leg and losing her title to Danielle, who is surprised. She becomes a local celebrity and wins a brand new car, jewelry, and several appearances on TV as Kathy tries to ride on her daughter's fame train.

These accidents get the attention of Detectives Wallace and Meyers, who suspect there's something fishy going on.

Carla, Miss Madison's organizer, takes Danielle to world-renowned pageant trainer Bryan Donahue. As a result, Danielle becomes more insecure as a result of his harsh and strict treatment. It's at this point that she begins to question her own mother's coaching and blames her for losing previous competitions.

As the pageant approaches, Danielle's involvement with Riley deepens, and he invites her to dinner at his mansion along with his step-mother Patrice, who accuses her of being a gold-digger. Her intent is to offer Danielle money to walk away (like she did with Shauna), but she fails.

Shauna recovers from the accident and is crowned Miss Bedford, giving her another opportunity to compete in Miss All-Star California.

She meets Riley at his office to tell him she's pregnant. As Shauna remains in the pageant, he offers to take care of the baby and tells Danielle the bad news.

In their investigation of Shauna's accidents, Wallace and Myers uncover that either Kathy or Patrice might be the main suspects. However, Deputy Myers feels this is not the case.

In order to disqualify Shauna from the contest, Kathy suggests that Danielle spread the information that she is pregnant. Shauna is talked to separately by one of the judges after winning the Miss Photogenic award. She says it's just a rumor and if he's looking for proof, then everyone should be tested.

Shauna is instructed to meet Riley after hours in the warehouse wearing her crown, in the hopes of preventing another victory for her. In this place, she is beaten, pushed, and murdered. Riley keeps feeling stupid as an autopsy reveals Shauna was never pregnant.

As it turns out, Danielle wins the Miss All-Star California contest, while Kathy is arrested just as she wins.

The evidence indicates that Kathy murdered Shauna to ensure Danielle won the contest. However, neither detective is able to identify a clear motive. In the course of further investigation, Danielle gives away clues, which alerts the detectives, who realize she is the murderer and has framed her own mother.

The movie ends with Danielle, on the verge of losing her mind, being arrested during a parade. It was the stress of losing yet another pageant, coupled with her love for Riley and dislike for Shauna, that messed with her head. She's then convicted and sentenced to life imprisonment without parole.

== Cast ==
- Yasmine Bleeth as Danielle Stevens
- Jill Clayburgh as Kathy Stevens
- Cassidy Rae as Shauna Langley
- Gates McFadden as Patrice
- George Eads as Riley Baxter
- Oliver Muirhead as Bryan Donahue
- Mathea Webb as Carla
- Sarah Grace Hubbard as Shannon Dwyer
- Maggie Myatt as Amy
- Angela Lambert as Amanda
- Catherine Staples as Bonnie
- Scott Foley as Matt
- Jack White as Emcee
- David Grant Wright as Kip
- Debbie Grattan as Jeannie
- Fred Ives as Andy
- Tom Hanson as TV Reporter
- Rob Tell as Paramedic
- Dan Malakoti as House Boy
- Milton Greenberg
- Troy Evans as Deputy Wallace
- Lily Knight

== Production ==
Filming took place in and around San Diego.
