= Love's Deadly Triangle: The Texas Cadet Murder =

- DVD cover with alternate title
- Also known as: Swearing Allegiance
- Genre: Crime drama
- Based on: "The Killer Cadets" by Skip Hollandsworth
- Written by: Steve Johnson
- Directed by: Richard A. Colla
- Starring: Holly Marie Combs; David Lipper; Cassidy Rae; Dee Wallace; Gary Grubbs; Kurt Fuller; Joanna Garcia
- Music by: Dennis McCarthy
- Country of origin: United States
- Original language: English

Production
- Executive producer: Steve White
- Producer: John Perrin Flynn
- Cinematography: James L. Carter
- Editor: John A. Martinelli
- Running time: 93 minutes
- Production company: Steve White Entertainment

Original release
- Network: NBC
- Release: February 10, 1997

Love's Deadly Triangle: The Texas Cadet Murder, released on video as Swearing Allegiance, is a 1997 American crime drama television film directed by Richard A. Colla and written by Steve Johnson, about the real-life 1995 murder of Adrianne Jones by Diane Zamora and David Graham in Texas. The film stars Holly Marie Combs as Zamora, David Lipper as Graham, Cassidy Rae as Jones, Dee Wallace, Gary Grubbs, Kurt Fuller, and Joanna Garcia. It was based on "The Killer Cadets", a 1996 Texas Monthly article by Skip Hollandsworth, and aired on NBC on February 10, 1997.

== Plot ==
The story of the real-life case of David Graham and Diane Zamora. It revolves around two best friends who turn out to be soul mates and who swear to stay together forever and ever, even to the point where Graham's apparently confessed infidelity leads to the couple's murder of Adrianne Jones, the girl with whom he purportedly cheated.

== Cast ==
- Holly Marie Combs as Diane Zamora
- David Lipper as David Graham
- Cassidy Rae as Adrianne Jones
- Dee Wallace as Mrs. Jones
- Wilmer Calderon as Perry

== Production ==
The film was based on Skip Hollandsworth's article "The Killer Cadets", the cover story of the December 1996 issue of Texas Monthly. Filming took place in Wilmington, North Carolina from November to December 1996.

== Controversy ==
The film was broadcast prior to trial, which raised objections of the lawyers for the defendants, as they were concerned that it may prevent the defendants from receiving a fair trial. The parents of the victim also raised objections about the film.
