= Models Inc. =

American drama television series

- Genre: Drama; Soap opera
- Created by: Frank South; Charles Pratt Jr.
- Starring: Linda Gray; Cameron Daddo; Brian Gaskill; David Goldsmith; Teresa Hill; Heather Medway; Carrie-Anne Moss; Cassidy Rae; Stephanie Romanov; Kylie Travis; Garcelle Beauvais; Special guest star: Emma Samms as Grayson
- Theme music composer: John E. Nordstrom
- Composers: Ken Harrison; John E. Nordstrom; Tim Truman
- Country of origin: United States
- Original language: English
- No. of seasons: 1
- No. of episodes: 29

Production
- Executive producers: Charles Pratt Jr.; Aaron Spelling; Frank South; E. Duke Vincent
- Running time: 45 minutes
- Production company: Spelling Entertainment

Original release
- Network: Fox
- Release: June 29, 1994 – March 6, 1995

Related
- Melrose Place

Models Inc. is an American prime time soap opera produced by Spelling Entertainment that aired on Fox from June 29, 1994, to March 6, 1995. A spin-off of Melrose Place, it is the third series in the Beverly Hills, 90210 franchise. The series was created by Frank South and Charles Pratt Jr., and executive produced by Aaron Spelling, South, Pratt, and E. Duke Vincent. Models Inc. revolves around a Los Angeles modeling agency run by Hillary Michaels (Linda Gray), the mother of Melrose Place's Amanda Woodward (Heather Locklear). The series lasted only a single season.

== Cast ==
=== Main characters ===
- Linda Gray as Hillary Michaels, the owner and president of the upmarket Los Angeles modeling agency, Models Inc. Twice-divorced, she is the mother of Amanda Woodward from her first marriage (to Palmer Woodward), and David Michaels from her second marriage (to Jack Michaels).
- Cameron Daddo as Brian Peterson, a jet-set photographer and Teri's boyfriend before her death. Later, he becomes involved with Sarah, then Cynthia, but their relationship is plagued by her controlling ex-boyfriend Frank, who eventually kidnaps, beats and rapes her.
- Brian Gaskill as David Michaels (episodes 1–12), Hillary's son and vice president of the agency. He is in an on-again-off-again relationship with model Julie Dante, and also becomes involved with Sarah Owens. Midway through the series, David leaves Los Angeles for Paris to form his own modelling company.
- David Goldsmith as Eric Dearborn, a sleazy wannabe rock star and Linda's abusive boyfriend. They eventually break up, but he feels deep regret over how he treated her, and they remain friends. When his career fails to get off the ground, he falls into prostitution. Later, Grayson recruits him to take down Adam, however he turns on her.
- Teresa Hill as Linda Holden, a model troubled by her past as a porn actress. She is initially involved with Eric, who blackmails her with her sex tape, and later is involved with millionaire Chris White, who also blackmails her.
- Heather Medway as Stephanie Smith (episodes 1–8), the receptionist at Models Inc., who has an obsessive crush on Brian. Later, she is revealed as Teri's killer, and also tries to kill David and Sarah before being arrested for her crimes.
- Carrie-Anne Moss as Carrie Spencer, an aging model, and a veteran at Models Inc. since the age of 17. She is the older sister of Teri, whom she has a rivalry with, and her initial storyline resolves around her secret son, Kyle, and her affair with his adoptive father Paul. When Grayson gains control of the agency towards the end of the series, Carrie is forced out and becomes a prostitute to make ends meet. In the season finale, Carrie is kidnapped and held captive in Central America.
- Cassidy Rae as Sarah Owens, a young and naive model who is new to the fashion industry, originally from the Midwest. She moves into the beach house and becomes Julie's primary rival. During the series, she battles with alcohol and substance abuse, eventually checking herself into rehab.
- Stephanie Romanov as Teri Spencer (episodes 1–8), and Monique Duran (episodes 8–29). Teri is Carrie's sister and one of the world's most famous supermodels. She is pushed off the balcony of a high rise building and killed in the pilot episode, appearing in the show until her killer's reveal via flashbacks. Monique is a doppelgänger of Teri's, who joins the agency midway through the show. She enters a relationship with nightclub owner Adam Louder, and becomes a target of his vindictive ex-wife Grayson.
- Kylie Travis as Julie Dante, an ambitious Australian-born supermodel with a bad reputation. Her wild lifestyle and public drunkenness have made her a tabloid fixture. Julie endured a rough childhood with a neglectful, alcoholic, adoptive mother and a sexually abusive, alcoholic stepfather, which gave her a cynical attitude and a pessimistic view on life. She initially feuds with Sarah, but mellows as the series progresses. Later, she fights with Monique over Adam Louder, before admitting her feelings for novelist Craig Bodi.
- Garcelle Beauvais as Cynthia Nichols (episodes 9–29; recurring episodes 5–8), a beautiful, African-American model who suffers from bulimia and becomes involved with Brian. She endures a violent kidnapping and rape at the hands of her abusive ex-boyfriend Frank, whom she shoots and kills.
- Emma Samms as Grayson Louder (episodes 18–29), Adam's scheming, sociopathic, English ex-wife, who arrives in Los Angeles after being presumed dead. Trying to drive a wedge between Monique and Adam, she buys half of Models Inc. from Hilary, and brings in new "models" from her former career as a madam. In the season finale, Grayson arranges Carrie's abduction and plots to kill Monique at her wedding to Adam. In the alternate ending, it is revealed that Grayson had been slain by the hitman she had hired to kill Monique. Like Heather Locklear in Melrose Place, she is credited as "special guest star" in the opening credits, alongside the main cast.

=== Recurring characters ===
- Robert Beltran as Louis Soto, a police lieutenant investigating Teri's murder who becomes involved with Hilary.
- William Katt as Paul Carson, Carrie's married lover and adopted father of her son Kyle.
- Kurt Deutsch as Chris White, Linda's wealthy love interest and heir to a soap company.
- James Wilder as Adam Louder, the owner of the nightclub Stage 99 and Grayson's ex-husband, who becomes romantically involved with Monique, Wilder previously appeared on Melrose Place as Reed Carter.
- John Haymes Newton as Mark Warriner, a priest who has a fling with Sarah, Newton would later appear on Melrose Place as Ryan McBride.
- Don Michael Paul as Craig Bodi, a wealthy author posing as beach bum who writes an exposé called Skin Deep about the models of Models Inc., later falls in love with Julie.
- Lonnie Schuyler as Ben Singer, Adam's right-hand man, Schuyler also later appeared on Melrose Place as Alan Ross.
- Harley Venton as Dr. Richard Heller, Carrie's sleazy psychiatrist who gets her committed to seduce Hillary.
- Johnathon Schaech as Frank Thompson, Cynthia's psychotic ex-boyfriend.
- Kim Zimmer as Joan, an older woman who hires Eric as a prostitute.
- Lisa Akey as Anna Jacobs, Julie's estranged stepsister.

== Production and development ==
Models Inc. is the third series in the Beverly Hills, 90210 franchise, and a direct spin-off of Melrose Place. In its second season (1993–94), Melrose Place was one of Fox's highest-rated shows, and had been called "arguably the hottest one-hour drama on television". In December 1993, Fox announced plans for a Melrose Place spinoff called Models Inc., set in a Los Angeles modeling agency. Spelling said, "[Fox] asked if we would do an eight-hour series. And we came up with Models." He initially explained that the series would center on Melrose Place character Jo Reynolds (Daphne Zuniga), and that two models would move into the titular apartment complex on Melrose Place before being transplanted into the new series. Entertainment Weekly also reported that the estranged mother of Amanda Woodward (Heather Locklear) would be introduced on Melrose Place to eventually lead Models Inc., and Locklear would not be headlining the new series as previously reported. Darren Star, the creator of both Beverly Hills, 90210 and Melrose Place, was not involved with Models Inc., which was created by Charles Pratt Jr. and Frank South, and executive produced by Aaron Spelling, Pratt, South, and E. Duke Vincent. Star said of the potential series, "It was one spin-off too many for me", though Spelling noted, "No one even thinks of Melrose as a spin-off anymore." Most of the connections to Melrose was phased out during the series, however references to Escapade Magazine (Billy Campbell's workplace in Melrose) were frequent throughout, and Sarah was admitted to Wilshire Memorial Hospital (Michael and Kimberly's workplace in Melrose) after the death of her baby later in the series.

Farrah Fawcett was considered for the lead role in Models Inc., which ultimately went to Linda Gray. The rest of the cast were unknowns, and Spelling promised "a great deal of backbiting" on the new series. Gray's Hillary Michaels, Amanda's mother, was introduced in the last few episodes of Melrose Place's second season to set up the new series. (Note: Gray appeared as Hillary in the 1994 Melrose Place episodes "The Bitch Is Back", "Imperfect Strangers", "Devil with the G-String On", and "Till Death Do Us Part".)

After five months, producers were not satisfied with Models Inc.'s Nielsen ratings, and Pratt said, "I'm willing to try anything to keep this show on the air." A new direction in the writing dropped implausible storylines and promised "more romance, more modeling, and more personal traumas". Brian Gaskill was written off, and Emma Samms was brought in as villainess Grayson Louder. With Fox promoting her as the Heather Locklear of Models Inc., Samms said, "I will do the best I can, but I can't concern myself with whatever expectations there are."

== Episodes ==
No.	Title	Directed by	Written by	Original release date	Viewers (millions)
1	"Pilot"	Charles Correll	Frank South & Charles Pratt Jr.	June 29, 1994	13.1
2	"Be My, Be My Baby"	Paul Lazarus	James Kramer	July 6, 1994	10.3
3	"It'll Never Happen Again and Again and Again"	James Whitmore Jr.	Jule Selbo	July 13, 1994	9.2
4	"Skin Deep"	Charles Correll	Robert Guza Jr.	July 20, 1994	9.7
5	"Strictly Business"	Chip Chalmers	Susan Cridland Wick	July 27, 1994	8.9
6	"When Girls Collide"	Paul Lazarus	James Kramer	August 3, 1994	9.7
7	"Nothing Is as It Seems"	Victoria Hochberg	Jule Selbo	August 10, 1994	9.7
8	"Meltdown"	Chip Chalmers	Robert Guza Jr.	August 17, 1994	10.2
9	"Old Models Never Die"	Parker Stevenson	Susan Cridland Wick	September 7, 1994	13.8
10	"Good Girls Finish Last"	Reza Badiyi	Charles Pratt Jr.	September 14, 1994	11.1
11	"Ultimatums Are Us"	Martin Pasetta	Jule Selbo	September 21, 1994	11.4
12	"Ghosts"	Chip Chalmers	Robert Guza, Jr.	September 28, 1994	11.3
13	"In Models We Trust"	Jefferson Kibbee	Jeff King	October 12, 1994	11.0
14	"Love and War"	Marina Sargenti	Susan Cridland Wick	October 19, 1994	9.4
15	"Clash of the Super Vixens"	Parker Stevenson	Charles Pratt Jr.	October 26, 1994	10.6
16	"Look Who's Stalking"	Michael Vejar	John Eisendrath	November 9, 1994	9.6
17	"Blind By Love"	Reza Badiyi	Jule Selbo	November 16, 1994	9.6
18	"Till Death Do Us Part"	Martin Pasetta	Robert Guza Jr.	November 23, 1994	8.6
19	"Bad Moon Rising"	Jerry Jameson	Charles Pratt Jr.	November 30, 1994	10.7
20	"Of Models and Men"	Linda Day	Susan Cridland Wick	December 14, 1994	9.2
21	"Out of Control"	Parker Stevenson	Jeff King	December 21, 1994	9.0
22	"Grayson Inc."	Victoria Hochberg	John Eisendrath	January 2, 1995	8.9
23	"Men Don't Leave"	Marina Sargenti	Jule Selbo	January 9, 1995	7.2
24	"Bring the Family"	Les Sheldon	Robert Guza Jr.	January 23, 1995	10.4
25	"Really Big Problems"	Jefferson Kibbee	Charles Pratt Jr.	February 6, 1995	10.1
26	"Adam's Family Values"	Marina Sargenti	Richard Gollance	February 13, 1995	9.3
27	"By Crook or by Hook"	Jerry Jameson	Kathryn Baker	February 20, 1995	9.8
28	"Exposure"	Les Sheldon	John Eisendrath	February 27, 1995	10.2
29	"Sometimes a Great Commotion"	Linda Day	Charles Pratt Jr.	March 6, 1995	10.3

=== Alternate ending ===
The last episode of Models Inc. ended with a cliffhanger that left multiple storylines, including Carrie's abduction, unresolved. Later, the series aired in the European market with an alternate ending that featured Grayson's death and Hillary shuttering Models Inc. The series was subsequently aired on E! with the new ending. A scene where Hillary figures out that Carrie was kidnapped and taken out of the country was scripted and the producers asked Fox if they could film it as part of the alternate ending, but the network refused as it was deemed pointless to spend money for a story that would never be revisited.

== Broadcast ==
Models Inc. aired on the Fox television network during the 1994–95 television season, premiering on June 29, 1994. Despite the presence of Gray and the mid-series introduction of Samms, the show's ratings remained poor, and it was canceled in 1995 when it placed 113th in the ratings with an average 7.1 rating.

== Reception ==
Ken Tucker of Entertainment Weekly praised Kylie Travis, calling her the show's "major casting coup", but added that Models Inc. was "trying much too hard to match Melrose for self-consciously outrageous campiness." Tony Scott wrote in Variety, "No one does much acting, since not much is required, but the posturings are pretty. The couplings are so far uninviting, the script by creators South and Pratt off-the-rack material." David Hiltbrand of People described the show as "part underwear ad, part catfight, part Lifestyles of the Rich and Famous and part psycho ward" and noting that "so far it's also pretty stiff and strident, particularly in regard to the acting."
