= Gates McFadden =

American actress and choreographer

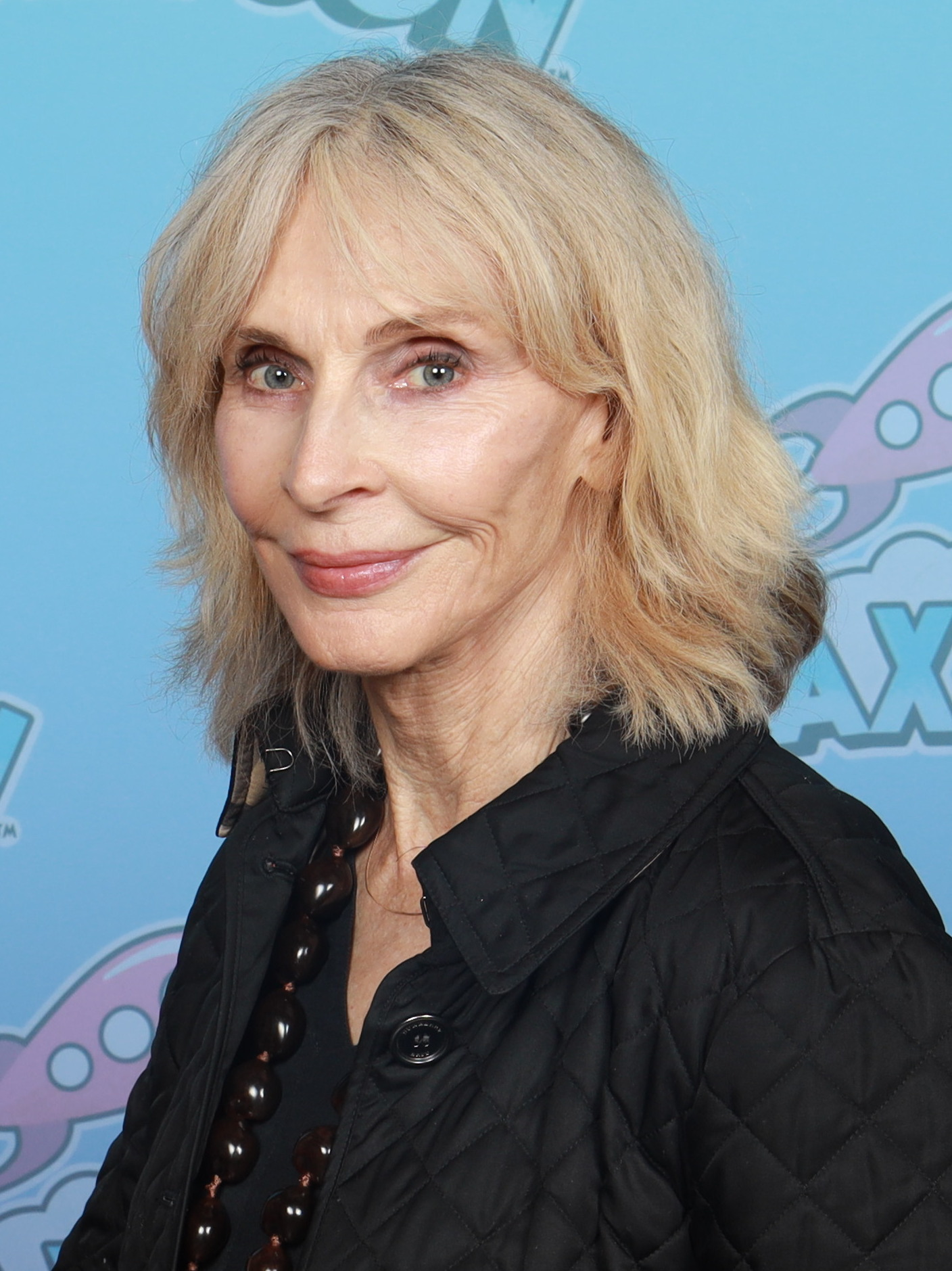
- McFadden in 2025
- Born: Cheryl Gates McFadden; March 2, 1949 (age 77); Akron, Ohio, U.S.
- Other name: Cheryl McFadden (choreography work)
- Education: Brandeis University (BA)
- Occupations: Actress; choreographer; teacher
- Years active: 1980–present
- Notable credit(s): Dr. Beverly Crusher in Star Trek: The Next Generation, the four subsequent films, and Star Trek: Picard
- Spouse: John Talbot
- Children: 1

Cheryl Gates McFadden (born March 2, 1949) is an American actress and choreographer. She is usually credited as Cheryl McFadden when working as a choreographer and Gates McFadden when working as an actress. She played Dr. Beverly Crusher in the television series Star Trek: The Next Generation, its four subsequent films, the third season of the sequel series Star Trek: Picard, and Star Trek: Prodigy.

== Early life ==
McFadden was born in Akron, Ohio, and grew up in the nearby suburb of Silver Lake. She graduated high school from Old Trail School in 1966. She attended Brandeis University, graduating with a Bachelor of Arts (cum laude) in the theatre arts, before moving to Paris, where she studied theatre with actor Jacques Lecoq at his school of physical theatre. McFadden is of Lithuanian descent on her mother's side, and has Irish and Scottish heritage on both sides.

== Career ==
=== Early work ===
In the 1970s, McFadden spent time teaching in post-secondary theater and dance departments, including those of the University of Pittsburgh, Harvard University, and George Washington University. During this period she formed a theatrical company, The New York Theatre Commotion, and in 1975 toured an all-female clown act, "Commedia Dell Pinky".

McFadden worked at The Jim Henson Company as the director of choreography and puppet movement for Labyrinth, The Muppets Take Manhattan, and uncredited work on Dreamchild. As a way of distinguishing her acting work from her choreography, she is usually credited as "Gates McFadden" as an actress and "Cheryl McFadden" as a choreographer. However, she was credited as "Cheryl McFadden" in the Troma movie When Nature Calls (1985) and in the season-three episode of The Cosby Show, "Cliff's 50th Birthday".

=== Star Trek: The Next Generation ===
==== Season 1 ====
In 1987, McFadden was cast as Dr. Beverly Crusher on Star Trek: The Next Generation. The Crusher character was slated to be Captain Jean-Luc Picard's love interest; another important aspect of the character was being a widow balancing motherhood and a career. McFadden clashed with Maurice Hurley, head writer and showrunner, about the characterization of Dr. Crusher. McFadden later stated, "I definitely pissed off Hurley. Because I kept saying, 'Why is it that I've raised this genius kid...and yet every time there's anything serious it's only the male characters who talk to him?'" She was also highly critical of the episode "Angel One," labeling it sexist. At Hurley's demand, McFadden's contract was not renewed at the end of the season. In her place, Diana Muldaur joined the production as the Enterprise's new chief medical officer, Dr. Katherine Pulaski, for the second season.

==== Seasons 3–7 ====
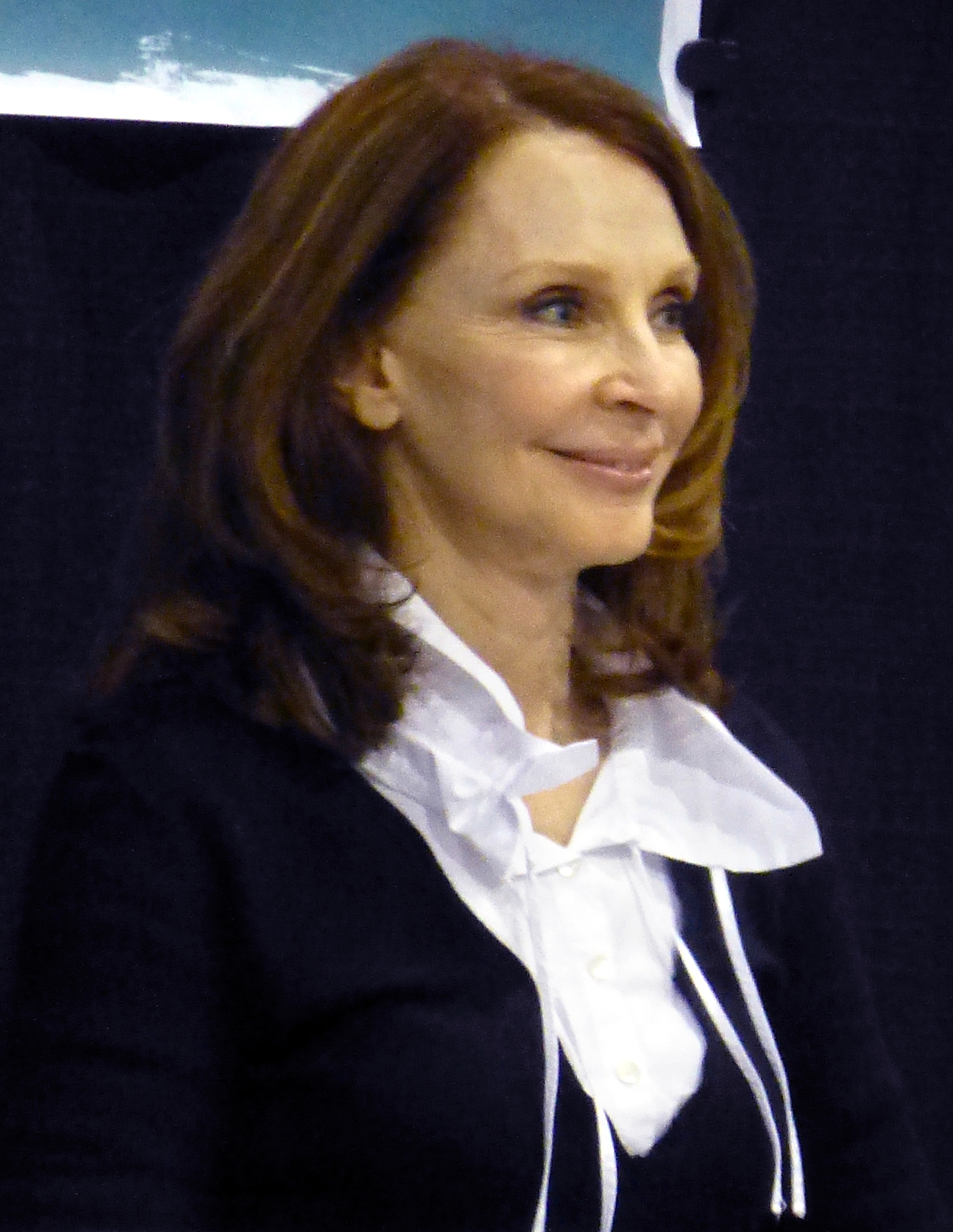
McFadden in 2014

Series creator Gene Roddenberry admitted that the Dr. Pulaski character did not develop chemistry with the other characters, so McFadden was approached to return as Dr. Crusher for the third season. She was hesitant, but after a phone call from co-star Patrick Stewart, and numerous fan letters, McFadden was persuaded to return to the role, which she then played through the remainder of the series.

Highlights for her character included "The High Ground", where she is kidnapped by terrorists; "Remember Me", where she becomes trapped in a warp bubble that her son Wesley accidentally created, plunging her into an alternate reality where everyone begins to vanish; "The Host", which features a romance between the doctor and an alien composed of two symbiotic organisms; "Suspicions", in which she risks her career to solve the murder of a scientist; "Descent" where Crusher takes command of the Enterprise; "Sub Rosa", where she becomes the victim of a seductive "ghost"; and "Attached", where Picard and Crusher become telepathically linked as prisoners and learn their true feelings for one another.

McFadden reprised her role for all four TNG movies and also provided her voice for PC games Star Trek: A Final Unity and Star Trek Generations. McFadden directed the seventh season episode "Genesis" (her only directing credit) in which an infection causes the crew to de-evolve into primitive forms of life, and choreographed the dance routine in the fourth season's "Data's Day".

=== After The Next Generation ===
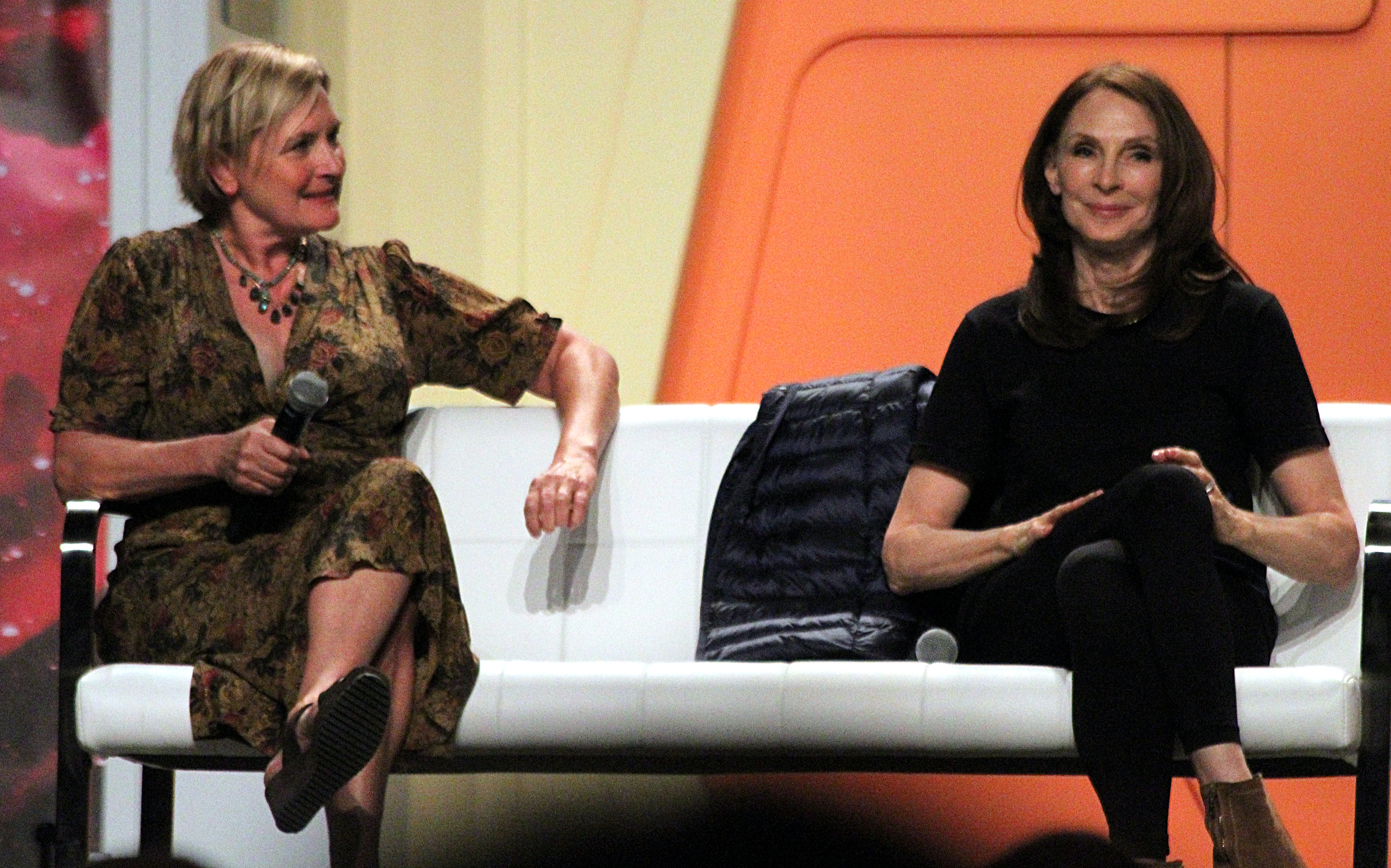
McFadden with co-star Denise Crosby at Creation Entertainment's 2017 Las Vegas Star Trek Convention

McFadden co-starred in the 1990 comedy Taking Care of Business with James Belushi, and fellow Next Generation alumnus John de Lancie (Q). That same year she appeared in The Hunt for Red October as Jack Ryan's wife, Catherine. In 1992, she appeared alongside fellow cast members Patrick Stewart, Jonathan Frakes, Brent Spiner, and Colm Meaney in a production of Every Good Boy Deserves Favour, which was performed in four cities. She also starred in the 1995 television series Marker with Richard Grieco and appeared in the made-for-television movie Crowned and Dangerous with Yasmine Bleeth in 1997. Additional television work was the role of Allison Rourke, Paul Buchman's boss, in four episodes of the sitcom Mad About You. In the spring of 2006, McFadden appeared in a series of television commercials for Microsoft.

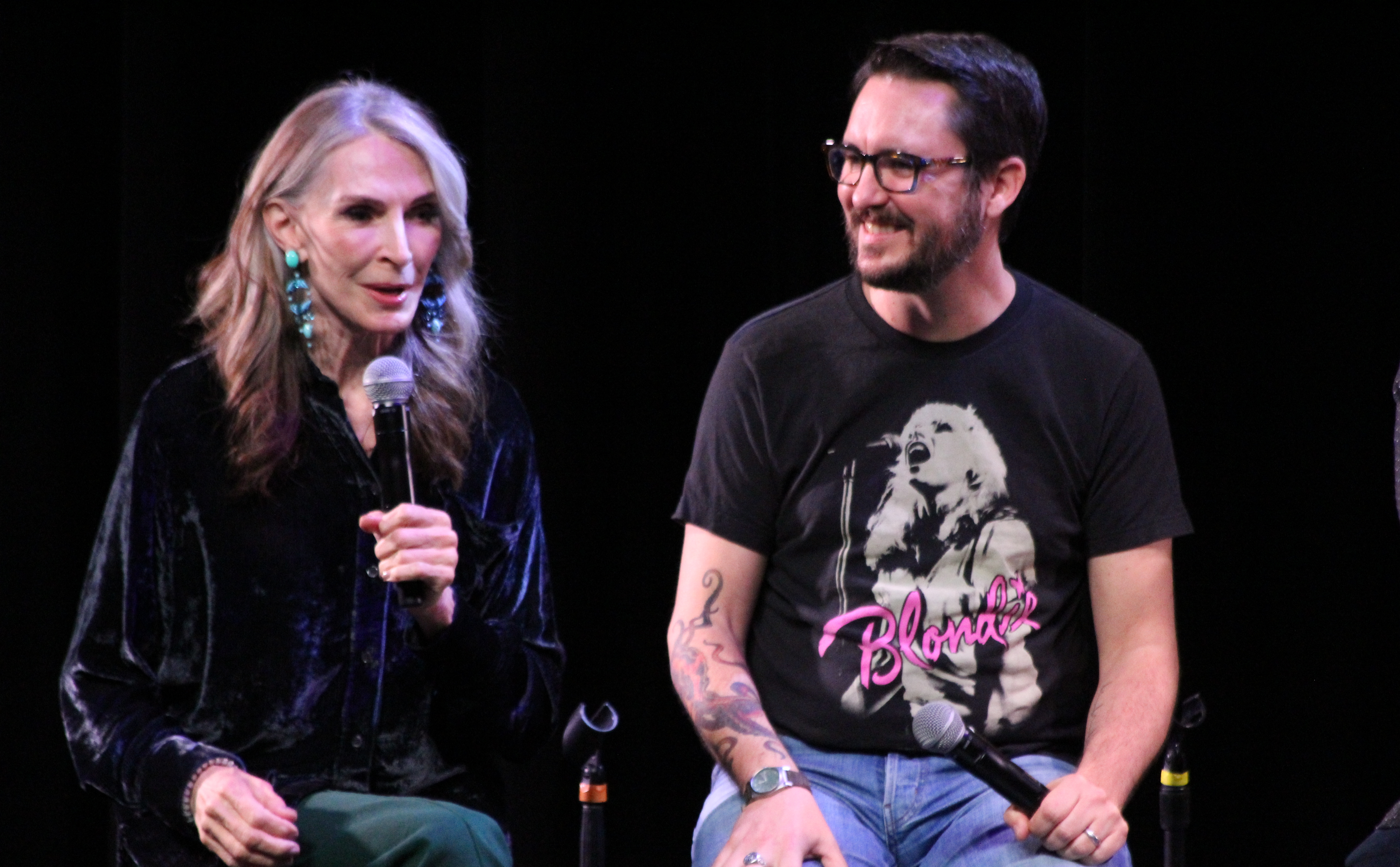
Gates McFadden with Wil Wheaton (who plays her son in the show) on the Star Trek Cruise III, January 2019

She has taught at several universities (American Academy of Dramatic Arts, Brandeis, Harvard, Purdue, Temple, the Stella Academy in Hamburg, and the University of Pittsburgh). As of August 2010, she was listed as an adjunct faculty member in the School of Theater at the University of Southern California. She was the artistic director of the Ensemble Studio Theatre/Los Angeles from January 2009 to October 2014. During her tenure, she spearheaded the building of the Atwater Village Theatre Collective, a new two-theater space in Los Angeles.

McFadden has lent her voice as narrator in several audio books. In 2010, she was the narrator of "Confessor" (METAtropolis: Cascadia).

McFadden was initially nervous to attend fan conventions, due to a stalking issue early in her teaching career prior to her Star Trek tenure. However her concerns have not come to pass and she has since found conventions to be a positive experience.

McFadden narrated the multi-part documentary series The Center Seat: 55 Years of Star Trek, which aired on the cable channel History in 2021. She was also one of the executive producers.

In 2021 McFadden launched Gates McFadden InvestiGates: Who Do You Think You Are?, a podcast for Brian Volk-Weiss's Nacelle Company, interviewing close friends and former co-stars.

She has since reprised the role of Crusher on Star Trek: Prodigy and Star Trek: Picard's third season as well as in the video game Star Trek Online.

== Personal life ==
McFadden became a mother in 1991. Her pregnancy was not written into the fourth season of The Next Generation. Her TNG co-star Brent Spiner is her son's godfather.

== Filmography ==
=== Film ===
Year	Title	Role	Notes
1984	The Muppets Take Manhattan	Mr. Price's Secretary	
1985	Rustlers' Rhapsody		Choreographer
1985	Dreamchild		Choreographer
1985	When Nature Calls	Gena	"Gena's Story" trailer
1986	Labyrinth		Choreographer
1990	The Hunt for Red October	Catherine Ryan	
1990	Taking Care of Business	Diane	
1994	Star Trek Generations	Dr. Beverly Crusher	
1996	Star Trek: First Contact	Dr. Beverly Crusher	
1998	Star Trek: Insurrection	Dr. Beverly Crusher	
2002	Star Trek: Nemesis	Dr. Beverly Crusher	
2005	Dirty	Wife	
2009	Make the Yuletide Gay	Martha Stanford	

=== Television ===
Year	Title	Role	Notes
1986	The Wizard	Darcy	Episode: "El Dorado"
1987	The Cosby Show	—N/a	Episode: "Cliff's 50th Birthday"
1987–1994	Star Trek: The Next Generation	Dr. Beverly Crusher	153 episodes
1990	Beyond the Groove	Secretary	Unknown episode
1992	L.A. Law	Uta Keller	Episode: "Steal It Again, Sam"
1993	Dream On	Ina Dreikoff	Episode: "The Book, the Thief, Her Boss and His Lover"
1994	Party of Five	Greer Erikson	Episode: "Something Out of Nothing"
1995	Marker	Kimba	13 episodes
1995–1996	Mad About You	Allison Rourke	4 episodes
1997	Crowned and Dangerous	Patrice Baxter	TV film
2000	The Practice	Judge Emily Harrison	Episode: "Checkmates"
2001	The Division	Mrs. Petersen	Episode: "Hero"
2004	The Handler	Siobhan	Episode: "Wedding Party"
2009	Family Guy	Herself (voice)	Episode: "Not All Dogs Go to Heaven"
2011–2013	Franklin & Bash	Judge Mallory Jacobs	4 episodes
2016	Scary Endings	The 911 Operator (voice)	TV short
2017	A Neighbor's Deception	Dr. Constance Abrams	TV film
2017	NCIS	Mrs. Belmont	Episode: "Skeleton Crew"
2022-2024	Star Trek: Prodigy	Dr. Beverly Crusher (voice)	3 episodes
2023	Star Trek: Picard	Dr. Beverly Crusher	10 episodes
2024	Masters of the Universe: Revelation	Queen Marlena (voice)	4 episodes
2024	X-Men '97	Mother Askani (voice)	Episode: "Tolerance is Extinction: Part 3"

=== Web series ===
Year	Title	Role	Notes
2023	Star Trek: Very Short Treks	Dr. Beverly Crusher (voice)	Episode: "Worst Contact"

== Theatre ==
Stage appearances

- (As Cheryl McFadden) Ellen/Mrs. Saunders and Betty, Cloud 9, Theatre De Lys, New York City, 1981.
- (As Cheryl McFadden) Title role, To Gillian on Her 37th Birthday, Ensemble Studio Theatre, New York City, 1983, then Circle in the Square Downtown, New York City, 1984.
- (As Cheryl McFadden) Ruth, The Homecoming, Jewish Repertory Theatre, New York City, 1984.
- (As Cheryl McFadden) Annie Sutter, The Bloodletters, Ensemble Studio Theatre, 1984.
- (As Cheryl McFadden) Casey Staiger, How to Say Goodbye, Vineyard Theatre, New York City, 1986.
- (As Cheryl McFadden) Dr. Handleman, Couch Tandem, Women's Interart Center, New York City, 1987.
- Kate, Emerald City, Perry Street Theatre, New York City, 1988.
- Lil, Voices in the Dark, George Street Playhouse, New Brunswick, NJ, 1998.
- (As Cheryl McFadden) Mary, Rosario and the Gypsies, Ensemble Studio Theatre; and as Mrs. Malloy, The Matchmaker, La Jolla Playhouse, San Diego, CA.
- Viva Detroit, Los Angeles
- Every Good Boy Deserves Favour
- L'Histoire du soldat

Stage work

- (As Cheryl McFadden) Choreographer, The Winter's Tale, Brooklyn Academy of Music Theatre Company, Helen Owen Carey Playhouse, Brooklyn, NY, 1980.
- (As Cheryl McFadden) Fight choreographer, Johnny on the Spot, Brooklyn Academy of Music Theatre Company, Brooklyn Academy of Music, Brooklyn, 1980.
- (As Cheryl McFadden) Choreographer, A Midsummer Night's Dream, Brooklyn Academy of Music Theatre Company, Brooklyn Academy of Music, 1981.
- Choreographer, Yesterday Is Over, Women's InterArt Center, New York City;
- Director, Bottleneck at the Bar, Golden Lion Theatre, New York City;
- Director and Choreographer, Bumps and Knots, Lyric Hammersmith Theatre, London;
- Director and choreographer, Women of Trachis, He Who Gets Slapped, and Old Times, all Spingold Theater, Waltham, MA;
- Director and choreographer, Medea, Studio Theatre, Pittsburgh, PA.

== Awards and honors ==
- 2024 – Saturn Awards – Lifetime Achievement Award – The Cast of Star Trek: The Next Generation (Note: "The Lifetime Achievement Award is usually presented to an individual for their contributions to genre entertainment. Top luminaries like Stan Lee and Leonard Nimoy, Mr. Spock himself, have received this top honor. It's not new, but we extended this award to cover the entire cast of Star Trek: The Next Generation, due to its continued influence on the face of general television. It was originally doomed to failure since it was following in the footsteps of the original Star Trek, yet it carved its own identity, and its diverse cast was light years ahead of its time!" —Academy of Science Fiction, Fantasy and Horror Films)
