= Angel Falls (TV series) =

American television series

- Genre: Soap opera
- Created by: Joyce Eliason
- Starring: Peggy Lipton; Grace Zabriskie; Shirley Knight; Cassidy Rae; William Frankfather; Kim Cattrall
- Composer: Christopher Franke
- Country of origin: United States
- Original language: English
- No. of seasons: 1
- No. of episodes: 6 (list of episodes)

Production
- Executive producers: Joyce Eliason; Frank Konigsberg; Larry Sanitsky
- Producer: Gregory Prange
- Running time: 60 minutes
- Production companies: The Konigsberg-Sanitsky Company; ACI

Original release
- Network: CBS
- Release: August 26 – September 30, 1993

Angel Falls is an American drama television series created by Joyce Eliason, that aired on CBS from August 26 to September 30, 1993.

== Premise ==
Rae Dawn Snow moves back to her hometown of Angel Falls in Montana. She meets up with an old flame, while her 16-year-old son becomes involved with his daughter. The show follows the relationship between three families: The Snows, the Larsons and the Harrisons.

== Cast ==
Starring

- James Brolin as Luke Larson
- Kim Cattrall as Genna Harrison
- Chelsea Field as Rae Dawn Snow
- Brian Kerwin as Eli Harrison
- Peggy Lipton as Hadley Larson
- Jeremy London as Sonny Snow
- Cassidy Rae as Molly Harrison
- Robert Rusler as Toby Riopelle
- Jean Simmons as Irene Larson

Guest starring

- Jimmy Baker as Robbie Larson
- William Frankfather as Sheriff Bailey
- Shirley Knight as Edie Wren Cox
- Ashlee Lauren as Sophie Harrison
- Marley Shelton as Brandi Dare
- Shannon Wilcox as Rowena Dare
- Grace Zabriskie as Cuema

== Episodes ==
Only six episodes aired before the show's cancellation:

No.	Title	Directed by	Written by	Original release date
1	"Pilot"	Unknown	Joyce Eliason	August 26, 1993
Rae Dawn Snow returns to Angel Falls with her teenage son to attend her father's funeral. Rae inherits her father's poolhall and becomes involved with married rancher Eli. Eli's alcoholic wife feels neglected and turns to the ranch's new hired hand. Luke Larson struggles with his marriage after the death of his son.
2	"Only the Lonely"	Unknown	Unknown	September 2, 1993
Someone finds out about the Rae Dawn and Eli's affair. Luke and Hadley's lives are about to turn around, but only for a short while. Sonny dumps Molly for Brandi Dare.
3	"Traps"	Unknown	Unknown	September 9, 1993
Hadley tries to hide that she is haunted by the memories of her deceased son. The police are called, when Eli punches someone from the bank. Eli rejects Genna's sexual advances. Brandi tells Molly that she and Sonny had sex.
4	"The Beginning of the End"	Unknown	Unknown	September 16, 1993
Luke is taking Hadley to a doctor in Missoula. Genna wants to use her inheritance to save the Harrison ranch. Sonny wants to break up with Brandi and go back to Molly. Sheriff Bailey questions Toby about his past.
5	"Lost Souls"	Jack Bender	Joyce Eliason	September 23, 1993
Rae Dawn learns that Genna and Eli are "reconnecting". Brandi claims that Sonny raped her. Hadly disappears. Toby's past is finally revealed.
6	"The Fall from Grace"	Larry Shaw	Joyce Eliason	September 30, 1993
Hadley become friends with a pregnant teen. Toby runs away from the police. Rae Dawn reveals a secret about Sonny.
