= Extreme Days =

2001 film

- DVD cover art
- Directed by: Eric Hannah
- Written by: Eric Hannah; Craig Detweiler
- Produced by: Cindy Bond; Betsy Chasse
- Starring: Dante Basco; Ryan Browning; A.J. Buckley; Derek Hamilton; Cassidy Rae
- Cinematography: Michael Wojciechowski
- Edited by: Andrew Eisen
- Music by: Klaus Badelt; Toby Mac
- Production companies: Champs; Impact Entertainment; Norann Entertainment; Tricor Entertainment; Truth Soul Armor
- Distributed by: Providence Entertainment mediacs AG
- Release date: September 28, 2001
- Running time: 93 minutes
- Country: United States
- Language: English
- Box office: $1 million

Extreme Days is a 2001 romantic comedy film about four boys on a roadtrip that they have been planning their whole lives. Their dreams are to participate in many extreme sports, but they are stopped short due to many circumstances.

== Plot ==
Four childhood friends, Will, Brian, Corey, and Matt, have had a dream since they were kids to surf, skate, and snowboard across California. After graduating from junior college, they decide to make the trip, but have to save money first. Through their jobs life guarding children's swimming pools and working at Turkish restaurants they manage to save $847.53, enough to cross California in their Joyota; a Jeep refitted with a Toyota engine. They decide to go to Mexico where they surf at Larosarita. Corey receives a phone call and is told of the unexpected death of his grandfather, "Grandpa G.", who left him an inheritance including a car, which Corey must travel to Yakima, Washington to pick up. The friends, who all knew Grandpa G., accompany him, counting on being able to pay for the return trip with the inheritance money.

On the way, the group runs into Matt's beautiful cousin Jessie, who needs a ride to Seattle because her car has broken down. Brian is immediately infatuated with her, but she avoids him, only increasing his desire for her. Corey makes a bet with Brian that he will not be able to get Jessie to do one thing he wants her to do by the end of the trip. As the trip continues, Jessie and Brian get closer, but Jessie has difficulties trusting Brian and his intentions toward her due to past experiences. She knew all along about the bet, but because of her convictions and some harsh words from Brian, she decides to leave, although it hurts her.

In low spirits, the boys arrive at the home of Grandma G in Washington, only to find that the car Corey has inherited is a junk car. Unable to get home, they are forced to sell the car to get money for the trip home. In a newspaper, Matt sees five tickets to Alaska on sale for $500. With the help of Grandma G, they sell the car online for $1,500.

Brian knows he messed up with Jessie and regrets his behaviour. Hoping to win her back, Brian and the others head to the University of Washington where she is giving a freshman orientation. Brian apologizes for what he did, telling Jessie he's never known anyone like her and that she woke him up. He asks her to come with them, but she tearfully says that she cannot. Matt gives her a plane ticket before the four friends leave. Brian waits at the airport for Jessie hopefully, but she does not come. As he takes his seat, his phone starts ringing; it is Jessie, who is sitting in the back of the plane.

== Cast ==
- Dante Basco as Corey Ng
- Ryan Browning as Brian Davidson
- A.J. Buckley as Will Davidson
- Derek Hamilton as Matt McKeague
- Cassidy Rae as Jessie Jacobs
- Ashlee Bond as Amanda

== Reception ==
Extreme Days was mostly panned by critics, receiving an aggregate score of 43 on Rotten Tomatoes, but only garnering a score of 17 at Metacritic ("extreme dislike or disgust") and ranking No. 97 on the all-time low scores (as of December 4, 2008).

== Soundtrack ==
The film's soundtrack features songs by alternative Christian artists.

- "Extreme Days" - TobyMac
- "We're Takin' Over" - Jamie Rowe
- "Loss For Words" - Tait
- "Downhill Games" - Klaus Badelt
- "One Time" - Earthsuit
- "Good Life" - Audio Adrenaline
- "Song X" - East West
- "King Planet" - Fold Zandura
- "A.M."- PAX217
- "I Want To Know You" - Sonicflood
- "Selah" - P.O.D.
- "Superfan" - Fanmail
- "God Is Love" - John Reuben (feat. TobyMac)
- "Alex" - .rod laver
- "Heartbeat" - Bleach
- "Entertaining Angels" - Newsboys
- "Jessie and Brian" - Klaus Badelt
- "Come on to the Future" - Skillet
