= Melrose Place season 1 =

Melrose Place
- Season 1
- DVD cover
- Starring: Josie Bissett Thomas Calabro Amy Locane Doug Savant Grant Show Andrew Shue Courtney Thorne-Smith Vanessa A. Williams Daphne Zuniga
- No. of episodes: 32

Release
- Original network: Fox
- Original release: July 8, 1992 – May 26, 1993

Season chronology
- Next → Season 2

The first season of Melrose Place, an American television series, premiered on Fox on July 8, 1992. The season one finale aired on May 26, 1993, after 32 episodes.

Each episode ran approximately 45 minutes in length, with the season premiere and finale being extended to 90 minutes. Production team for the first season of the show includes Chip Hayes as producer, Charles Pratt, Jr. as co-producer, Frank South and Frederick Rappaport as supervising producers and Aaron Spelling, E. Duke Vincent and Darren Star as executive producers.

The season was released on DVD as an eight-disc box set under the title of Melrose Place - The Complete First Season on November 7, 2006, by Paramount Home Video.

== Storylines ==
During its first season, Melrose Place was an earnest serial drama with low-key storylines focusing on young people who come to Los Angeles to realize their dreams. The series was introduced with a crossover story from Beverly Hills, 90210 in which Kelly Taylor (Jennie Garth) pursues Melrose Place resident Jake Hanson (Grant Show), a laborer and bad-boy biker. Jake first appeared in the last two episodes of Beverly Hills, 90210's second season, while Kelly continued their storyline with appearances in the first three episodes of Melrose Place, along with Brian Austin Green as David Silver, and Ian Ziering as Steve Sanders. Tori Spelling also appears in the first two episodes as her Beverly Hills, 90210 character Donna Martin. Eventually, Jake breaks off the romance because of their age difference and his inability to commit to her.

Michael (Thomas Calabro) and Jane Mancini (Josie Bissett) are the building's stable couple. Michael, the building superintendent, is a physician at Wilshire Memorial Hospital, and Jane is a budding fashion designer. Their neighbors are roommates Alison Parker (Courtney Thorne-Smith) and Billy Campbell (Andrew Shue). Alison is a receptionist at a local advertising firm, and Billy is a struggling writer who makes ends meet as a dance teacher, a taxi driver, a local newspaper reporter and a furniture salesman before finding a job at Escapade magazine near the end of the season. Alison and Billy later began an affair. Gay social worker Matt Fielding (Doug Savant) files a sexual-discrimination lawsuit against the halfway house at which he volunteers.

Other original cast members are aerobics instructor Rhonda Blair (Vanessa A. Williams) and her roommate, actress Sandy Louise Harling (Amy Locane), who moonlights as a waitress at Shooters, the group's hangout. Sandy was written out of the series after 13 episodes, after being discovered by a talent agent for a soap opera, with the producers admitting later that they "never knew what they wanted to do with the character". She was replaced by photographer Jo Reynolds (Daphne Zuniga), who arrives from New York to escape her alcoholic ex-husband. Jo and Jake become friends and enjoy an on-again, off-again romance.

Faced with mediocre ratings, its producers attempted to revamp the series. Heather Locklear was introduced as Amanda Woodward, the art director at D & D Advertising, and Alison's confidante. Intended as a guest star for a four episode story arc, Locklear remained on the series throughout its run. Amanda became vice-president, having affairs with several Melrose Place residents and vying with Alison for Billy's affections. The series evolved from an episodic format to a soap opera with ongoing, interwoven stories, beginning with Michael Mancini's affair with co-worker Kimberly Shaw (Marcia Cross) and Alison's affair with a married man who begins stalking her in the season finale after she ends the relationship. The season ends with Alison and Billy becoming a couple, Michael and Jane splitting up when Jane discovers his affair with Kimberly, and Amanda's miscarriage of Billy's baby and her purchase of the building.

At the end of the season, Vanessa Williams was fired, citing the show's changes, "They didn’t invite me back for the second season. It wasn’t anything about my work, but they decided to go a different route". Her character Rhonda left the apartment complex after becoming engaged to wealthy restaurateur Terrence Haggard (John Marshall Jones).

== Cast ==
=== Main cast members ===
In alphabetical order

- Josie Bissett as Jane Mancini
- Thomas Calabro as Michael Mancini
- Amy Locane as Sandy Harling (episodes 1–13)
- Doug Savant as Matt Fielding
- Grant Show as Jake Hanson
- Andrew Shue as Billy Campbell
- Courtney Thorne-Smith as Alison Parker
- Vanessa Williams as Rhonda Blair
- Daphne Zuniga as Jo Reynolds (episodes 15–32)

=== Recurring guest stars ===
- Jennie Garth as Kelly Taylor
- Ian Ziering as Steve Sanders
- Brian Austin Green as David Silver
- Deborah Adair as Lucy Cabot
- Salome Jens as Joan Campbell
- Carmen Argenziano as Dr. Stanley Levin
- Marcia Cross as Dr. Kimberly Shaw
- William R. Moses as Keith Gray
- James Handy as Matt Fielding Sr.
- Claudette Nevins as Constance Fielding
- Rae Dawn Chong as Carrie Fellows
- Sydney Walsh as Kay Beacon
- John Marshall Jones as Terrence Haggard
- Laura Leighton as Sydney Andrews
- Heather Locklear as Amanda Woodward
- Wayne Tippit as Palmer Woodward
- Meg Wittner as Nancy Donner

The role of Billy Campbell was originally played by actor Stephen Fanning, who beat out Matthew Perry for the role. Days into shooting the pilot, Fanning was fired and replaced by Andrew Shue. His scenes were reshot.

== Episodes ==
No. overall	No. in season	Title	Directed by	Written by	Original release date	Prod. code	U.S. viewers (millions)
1	1	"Pilot"	Howard Deutch	Darren Star	July 8, 1992	2392001	16.0
Alison's roommate leaves in the middle of the night and sticks her with the rent. The goofy Billy Campbell approaches her and asks about the vacancy, but she turns him down. Faced with eviction, she finally takes him up on his offer. Alison accidentally dents the car door of a vice president at the ad agency that employs her, D&D. She accepts a date with him, but Billy has to come to the rescue when the man tries to force his way into the apartment. Jake attempts a relationship with Kelly Taylor, a beautiful teenager in love with him, whose house he had helped remodel. They are constantly faced with obstacles due to their age difference. Rhonda is pursued by one of her aerobics students, but learns that his interest is anything but romantic. Jennie Garth (Kelly), Ian Ziering (Steve), Brian Austin Green (David) and Tori Spelling (Donna) reprise their characters from Beverly Hills, 90210. Grant Show first appeared as Jake in two episodes of Beverly, with Garth appearing on the first three episodes of Melrose to continue their characters' storylines, along with brief appearances by Ziering and Green in each show. Spelling appeared in only the first two episodes as her character then left to study in France for the rest of the summer.
2	2	"Friends and Lovers"	Daniel Attias	Charles Pratt, Jr.	July 15, 1992	2392002	19.0
Billy gets a job as a cab driver. He makes a connection with a passenger, and they quickly begin dating. Alison is put off by the speed of the couple's courtship, and grows tired of Marcy's constant presence in the apartment. Billy, Michael and Jane all accuse her of jealousy, but she denies it. Billy soon has second thoughts about his relationship when Marcy tells his friends intimate details about their sex life, and quickly declares her love for him. Billy tries to avoid her, but Jake advises him to confront Marcy to break things off in person. Jake is arrested following a scuffle at the unemployment office, and is less than grateful when Kelly bails him out. Jane worries about the status of her marriage when Michael is unable to recall the specific moment he fell in love with her.
3	3	"Lost and Found"	Charles Braverman	Frederick Rappaport	July 22, 1992	2392003	15.2
Jake fears that Kelly will be hurt if they continue their relationship. He sets up a fake date with a friend and rubs it in Kelly's face to trick her into breaking up with him. Jane is depressed when Michael must work instead of spending a romantic evening with her. Jane loses her wedding ring during a girls' night out with Rhonda. Billy completes his first screenplay, but Alison is decidedly less than impressed.
4	4	"For Love or Money"	Steven Robman	Amy Spies	July 29, 1992	2392004	11.7
Alison is befriended by a guy from the mail room, who quickly asks her out. He reveals that his father is the vice president of a sunscreen company with which D&D is doing business. She makes a suggestion for the campaign, and is enraged when Rick steals the idea and pitches it to Lucy, her boss. Alison tells Lucy what happened, but she is afraid to do anything because of possible repercussions from Rick's father. Lucy gives Alison the chance to work on the campaign, and Alison develops a new ruthless attitude that she later comes to regret. After failing miserably in his new job at a coffee shop, Jake agrees to help his ex-girlfriend Peri with the sale of a fraudulent painting. He backs out of the deal after catching Peri using drugs, and later lands a job as a mechanic. Matt questions Rhonda's character after she reneges on a promise to help with a dinner at the halfway house. John McCann, who appears in a guest role as Joe Danworth, later had a recurring role as Amanda's attorney, Walter Kovacs.
5	5	"Leap of Faith"	Bethany Rooney	Ellen Herman	August 5, 1992	2392005	12.1
Jane learns that she is pregnant, but doesn't tell Michael because he hadn't seemed thrilled by the prospect of having kids. She tries to get an abortion secretly, but changes her mind. Michael is furious at Jane for keeping him in the dark, until the joy over their child brings them back together. Billy is given a column in the neighborhood newspaper. He can't come up with a topic because his life is boring. Hoping to alleviate this problem, he convinces Jake and Matt to go bungee-jumping with him. After he is unable to go through with the jump, Billy writes a column about "wimping out."
6	6	"Second Chances"	Jefferson Kibbee	Toni Graphia	August 12, 1992	2392007	14.6
Jake asks Alison to help him study for his G.E.D., but requests that she keep the matter a secret. The building is filled with gossip after Alison is seen sneaking out of Jake's apartment after an all-night study session. Billy and Sandy become jealous. Jake and Alison share a kiss, but decide to just remain friends. When Rhonda meets up with an old friend from her dancing days, she is haunted by memories of the injury she faked to avoid an audition. After Rhonda learns that a spot has opened in her friend's dance troupe, she is determined to redeem herself. She nails the audition, but decides that she's happy with her current life.
7	7	"My Way"	Bethany Rooney	Darren Star	August 19, 1992	2392006	13.0
Billy is depressed when the Melrose Times folds. He asks Alison to accompany him on a visit to his parents' house, then pleads with her to pose as his girlfriend. Billy tries to convince his parents that he is on the verge of becoming a successful writer, but is roped into helping run his father's furniture store because of a deal the two once made. He quits in a huff after his father questions his sales techniques, and later asks his dad to let him live his own life. Sandy gets a swelled head after landing a part in a horror movie, and ends up moving out. She comes down to earth after the director tries to insert nudity into one of her scenes. Michael injures himself at the apartment. He and Jane discuss their excitement and anxiety about the upcoming birth of their baby.
8	8	"Lonely Hearts"	Jefferson Kibbee	Charles Pratt, Jr.	September 2, 1992	2392008	12.3
While Sandy is hat-shopping with Rhonda, a cute guy named Paul sees her through the store window. He quickly asks her out, and she accepts. However, she soon realizes that there is no spark between them and tries to let him down gently. Paul can't seem to take the hint, and keeps showing up and trying to win her heart. Sandy becomes very uncomfortable, but her friends feel that Paul is a nice guy who deserves a chance. However, he soon begins calling her in the middle of the night. Jake promises to protect Sandy, and they discuss their dysfunctional relationship as they spend time together. Paul breaks into Sandy's apartment and covers her bedroom with flowers. Jake tracks him down and roughs him up, and winds up behind bars. Sandy angrily confronts Paul and convinces him to drop the charges and leave her alone. Meanwhile, Alison looks to replace her clunker car, "Betsy." However, she has a hard time letting go of her first car because of all the memories it holds. Nigel Gibbs, who appears in a guest role as a police officer, later had a recurring role as Detective Wylie.
9	9	"Responsibly Yours"	Daniel Attias	Frederick Rappaport	September 9, 1992	2392009	11.0
Billy helps a woman whose car has broken down along the side of her road. He gives her a ride to a gas station. When she doesn't have the money to pay him, she gives him some passes to a club where she is performing stand-up comedy for an Open Mic night. They get along very well, but Billy soon learns that she has an eight-year-old son. The boy initially rejects Billy, but they soon begin to bond. Billy loses Alison's trust by lying to her so that she will loan him the money Dawn needs for car repairs to make it to her first professional stand-up gig. The relationship falls apart when Billy gets into a confrontation with Dawn's useless ex-husband. Jake and Sandy try to rebuild their relationship, agreeing to go on a "platonic" date. Things quickly get out of hand, leaving Sandy enraged and the two not on speaking terms.
10	10	"Burned"	Janet Greek	Robert Guza, Jr.	September 16, 1992	2392010	9.9
During his surprise birthday party, Jake receives an unexpected visit from his mother. Her constant drinking and carousing creates friction in their already-strained relationship. Although Sandy suggests that he be more understanding, Jake throws his mother out. He is too hurt by her mistakes of the past to have her in his present life. He later goes to see her off and wish her well. Billy is the victim of a car-jacking after dropping off a passenger in South Central, and begins to display signs of racial prejudice. Rhonda is furious. She talks with Matt and says that her reaction is partially the result of disappointment in herself; she has become so intent on living her life color blind that she has turned her back on her culture. Billy and Jake conduct a stake-out that leads to the arrest of the culprit. Rhonda takes Billy back to South Central to educate him about the area's people. Jane and Michael quarrel after he behaves insensitively during a parenting class. She believes he is too impatient, while he accuses her of being overprotective.
11	11	"A Promise Broken"	Nancy Malone	Charles Pratt, Jr.	September 30, 1992	2392011	9.3
During a routine appointment, Jane learns that her baby has died. Michael is reluctant to express his emotions about the loss, and quarrels with colleague Kimberly Shaw when she tries to convince him to show his feelings. He later apologizes, and the two flirt rather obviously. The Mancinis' friends give them a dog to help take their mind off of losing the baby, but Jane loses the dog at the beach. Michael lashes out at her and admits that he fears she may have lost the baby because she initially considered an abortion. He later apologizes for not being more supportive throughout the pregnancy. They find the dog, but let a lonely old woman keep it. Meanwhile, Alison is enraged after finding Billy fooling around with one of her bras while doing the laundry. She claims their friendship is over, but later explains the reason for her anger. First appearance of Marcia Cross as Dr. Kimberly Shaw. Initially recurring, she would be made a series regular from season 4.
12	12	"Polluted Affairs"	Daniel Attias	Amy Spies	October 21, 1992	2392012	11.7
After a chance meeting in the street, Alison becomes romantically involved with environmentalist Keith Gray. She is stunned to learn that he is married, but finds it difficult to break off the relationship after he vows to leave his wife for her. Billy is saddled with bad credit because he has yet to pay off a college loan that he didn't even need. Jane is determined to work off the weight from her pregnancy. She realizes that she is trying too hard to forget the miscarriage.
13	13	"Dreams Come True"	John Nicolella	Ellen Herman	October 28, 1992	2392013	10.7
Alison continues to see Keith, despite the misgivings of her friends and the fact that her erratic behavior has put her job in jeopardy. Billy confronts Keith about his treatment of Alison. Matt is the victim of an attack outside a nightclub. When an officer from the hate crimes unit comes to the halfway house, Matt's supervisor is stunned to learn that Matt is gay. He quickly devises a reason to fire him. Jake and Rhonda convince Matt to seek legal recourse. A customer at Shooters asks Sandy to audition for a soap opera. She wins the role and moves to New York. Final appearance of Amy Locane as Sandy Harling.
14	14	"Drawing the Line"	David Rosenbloom	Robert Guza, Jr.	November 4, 1992	2392014	12.7
Keith stays with Alison while his estranged wife, Lily, is in town for the weekend. Alison is wracked with guilt after Lily confronts her in a dream, and recalls the despair her mother suffered following her father's affair. After bailing out of a camping trip, Alison drives to Keith's house to catch a glimpse of Lily. She realizes that she can't continue the affair. Matt's parents refuse to support his lawsuit because they fear it would damage their reputation. He finds a lawyer who will work for free, provided that he let her use the case to publicize the issue of anti-gay discrimination. Rhonda's "efficient" new roommate turns out to be completely anal-retentive.
15	15	"House of God"	Nancy Malone	Robert Guza, Jr.	November 11, 1992	2392015	12.9
A mysterious aspiring photographer named Jo Reynolds moves into the building. She responds coldly to the other residents' attempts to make nice, although she develops an instant attraction to Jake. She strikes up a friendship with Alison when they take out their romantic frustration on a washing machine. Jo explains that she left New York to escape from her marriage. The women continue to bond, and hustle some guys in a pool game at Shooters. Jo flirts shamelessly with Jake after he comes up to her apartment in a towel to remind her about the hot water shortage. Michael and Jane begin spending time with a respected pediatrician and his wife. Jane suspects that the woman is being abused, but Michael doesn't believe it because her husband is so good with his patients. Jane is certain that something is wrong, and pleads with Liz to seek help. Liz goes to the Mancinis after being beaten, and decides to leave Scott. Michael plans to report Scott to their boss, but convinces him to do it himself. First appearance of Daphne Zuniga as JoBeth Reynolds.
16	16	"The Whole Truth"	Charles Braverman	Joe Viola	November 18, 1992	2392016	9.9
Billy tries to hit on Jo, but gets nowhere. Jake tries the exact same line, and Jo agrees to go for a motorcycle ride with him. Jo asks Jake to drop her off--claiming to have a job interview--but instead goes to a pawn shop to sell a bracelet. She cannot sell it because she has no photo ID. She is annoyed to find that Jake has been following her, but asks him to sell the bracelet on her behalf. The jeweler believes it might be stolen because it has the inscription "To Beth."
17	17	"Jake vs Jake"	Victoria Hochberg	Frank South	November 25, 1992	2392017	10.5
Jake is visited by an old girlfriend, Colleen, who stuns him with the news that he is the father of her four-and-a-half-year-old son. She asks Jake to waive his parental rights so that her husband can adopt the boy. Jake is furious that Colleen failed to tell him the truth, and considers starting a custody battle. He believes that caring for a son could give him the direction he is lacking in his life. Jake becomes angry because Jo believes it might be best to let the boy stay with a stable family. Jake ultimately decides that it is in David's best interests to stay with Colleen and her husband, and signs away the rights. Jo secretly takes a photo of Jake with his son as a memento. Alison learns that she needs surgery to remove a benign tumor from her uterus. If she doesn't have the surgery, she may not be able to have children. However, she has no way to pay for the operation because she has no insurance. Billy becomes very frustrated with the ever-present bureaucracy at every hospital, and considers asking for a loan from his parents. Alison turns him down, but grows to appreciate what a great friend he is. Michael finds a way to get the surgery performed for free, although Alison must pay for her room. Rhonda begins a whirlwind romance with wealthy restaurant owner Terrence Haggard after they meet while arguing over a crate of strawberries at the produce market.
18	18	"A Melrose Place Christmas"	Bethany Rooney	Darren Star	December 16, 1992	2392018	10.8
Alison undergoes successful surgery, and Billy agrees to care for her when she returns home from the hospital. They both become frightened by how much they have come to care about each other. Jake and Jo observe that the necklace Billy plans to give Alison for Christmas is more than a "friendship" present. Billy disagrees, but decides not to give Alison the gift after she makes him agree to a "no presents" pact (because she is short on cash). Alison fears that she has hurt Billy's feelings. She later apologizes, and he gives her the necklace. They admit that they have become confused by their feelings. Jo and Jake try to overcome their unhappy memories of Christmas. He is excited about making a fresh start, but she remains cynical and wants to ignore the holiday. She also tries to push Jake away, but they end up having a hot make-out session. Michael is depressed when he and Kimberly cannot save a young gunshot victim, but his spirits are revived after delivering a baby for the first time. He invites Kimberly to the Christmas party, as Jane is out of town. Rhonda flies to Aspen with Terrence for the holidays. Matt makes up with his father.
19	19	"Single White Sister"	Charles Correll	Ellen Herman	January 6, 1993	2392019	9.4
Jane receives a surprise visit from her sister Sydney, who has dropped out of college. Jane keeps the news from their parents, but is annoyed when Syd hangs around her workplace. Kay eventually hires Sydney as her assistant. Billy agrees to set up Alison with one of his friends, as she needs a date to the advertisers' ball. He scuttles the whole thing due to jealousy, and agrees to be Alison's date to make it up to her. Jake buys a new motorcycle and tries to convince Jo to take his old bike. She hesitates because she fears becoming indebted to a man. Jake tries to prove himself by taking up one of Jo's interests, poetry. He tells her that he has gained a lot from knowing her, and that he only wants to see her happy. Jo is disturbed when she is repeatedly contacted by her husband, whom Jake later finds snooping around the mailboxes. Rhonda is furious when Terrence doesn't defend her honor to his snobbish friends, but he later proposes marriage. First appearance of Laura Leighton as Sydney Andrews. Initially recurring, she would be made a series regular from season 3. Linden Ashby, who appears in a guest role as Jo's ex-husband Charles, later became a regular cast member as Dr. Brett Cooper.
20	20	"Peanut Butter and Jealousy"	Nancy Malone	Charles Pratt, Jr.	January 13, 1993	2392020	9.8
Sydney continues to get on Jane's nerves. Jane tells Michael that she is going to kick Sydney out of the apartment, but Michael has already asked Syd to take Jane out and get her to a surprise birthday party. He convinces Jane to go out with Sydney and think things over. This proves to be a disaster, as they get into an argument. Jane accuses Syd of trying to steal her life, and Sydney lets her storm out instead of taking her to the party. Michael has to spoil the surprise to get Jane to the event. Jane orders Sydney to move out, and the two talk about their long-standing differences. Jake reluctantly tells Jo about his meeting with her husband, Charles. Jo decides to contact Charles. Jake feels helpless when Jo begins seeing Charles, who seems to be a changed man. Jake later admits his strong feelings for Jo and shares his frustration about standing on the sidelines. Charles shows his ugly side after drinking, and grants Jo a divorce. Jo thanks Jake for his patience, and he agrees to hang in until she is ready to make a commitment. Billy is hurt when Alison leaves the advertisers' ball with another man. Rhonda becomes caught up in wedding preparations. Matt fears that he and Rhonda will drift apart after her marriage. She ignores tradition and asks him to be her best man in the wedding.
21	21	"Picture Imperfect"	Nancy Malone	Story by : Nicole Yorkin & Dawn Prestwich; Teleplay by : Darren Star & Frank South & Charles Pratt Jr.	January 27, 1993	2392021	N/A
Alison is promoted to junior account executive and works with art director Amanda Woodward on an underwear account. Alison flirts with the handsome tennis star who is modeling for the account. She decides not to pursue him because she fears it could affect her career. Jo is hired as photographer, but jeopardizes the account with her "alternative" photos. Alison gets into hot water when she takes a risk and shows the client Jo's photos, even though they had already expressed approval about the more traditional shots. Jo upsets Jake and Alison by going to dinner with Rex. She later apologizes to Jake and admits that she has strong feelings for him. Billy doesn't hit it off with a blind date arranged by Michael, but is attracted to Amanda. An overwhelmed Rhonda breaks her engagement after Terrence tries to buy them a house in the suburbs. First appearance of Heather Locklear as Amanda Woodward. Initially recurring, she would be made a series regular (credited as "special guest star") from season 2.
22	22	"Three's a Crowd"	Jefferson Kibbee	Amy Spies	February 3, 1993	2392022	10.7
Amanda, Billy and Alison spend the weekend at a lakeside cabin. Alison is concerned by Billy and Amanda's obvious attraction. She asks Billy not to date Amanda, as a break-up could hurt Alison's career. They decide to see each other behind her back, but Amanda later comes clean. Alison becomes angry with Billy for sharing her concerns with Amanda. She grows lonely and tries unsuccessfully to call Keith. Jake and Jo have a romantic evening and consummate their relationship. After spending the weekend together, they avoid one another because they are worried about the direction of the relationship. They agree to just relax and take things as they come. Matt is caught in the middle of Rhonda and Terrence's romantic problems. The couple gets back together, but decides to take it slow.
23	23	"My New Partner"	Richard Lang	Frank South	February 10, 1993	2392023	9.9
Alison remains irritated about Billy's relationship with Amanda. Amanda suggests that Alison might have feelings for Billy, and recommends that the two discuss their relationship. Alison begins to consider this possibility, and Billy agrees to meet with her. Someone sends flowers to Alison at work and asks her to meet him at Shooters that night. She assumes that the flowers are from Billy (creating problems for Billy and Amanda), but is instead approached by a newly divorced Keith. She agrees to give their relationship another try, so long as they take things slowly. Alison and Keith have a disastrous dinner with Billy and Amanda. Billy goes home with Amanda and sleeps with her. Jo's husband offers her a $50,000 divorce settlement, but she wants to turn it down because of her pride. Jake feels that this is a foolish decision from someone who doesn't know what it's like to be poor. Jake loses his job when the repair shop goes out of business. He believes that he could take over the shop and make a profit, but the bank refuses to give him a loan. Jo decides to take her husband's money and invest it in the down payment on the shop. Jake wants no part in this, as he feels that it would complicate their relationship and make him feel as though she "owned" him. He later apologizes for being so stubborn, and they agree to become business partners.
24	24	"Bye Bye Billy"	Victoria Hochberg	Nicole Yorkin & Dawn Prestwich	February 17, 1993	2392024	13.7
Billy backs out of plans with Alison to have dinner with Amanda and her father. Amanda's father declares that Billy is a worthless bum. Keith loans Alison his sports car, but she has it stolen at gunpoint. He comforts her when Billy isn't home to hear her tearful messages. Billy feels guilty about not being there for Alison. Amanda suspects that Billy is in love with Alison. He tries to disprove this by moving in with Amanda. Keith and Alison renew their relationship. She asks him to move in with her, but he later receives an unexpected job offer. Keith asks Alison to move to Seattle with him. Jake objects to "silent partner" Jo's attempts to help with the business. Jo takes Alison to the shooting range to try to help her overcome her fears about the carjacking, but Alison is horrified by the fact that Jo owns a gun. Jo mentions this to Jake, who is equally appalled. Jo promises to get rid of her gun. Jake apologizes for being stubborn and asks Jo to be his full partner and do the books for the shop. Rhonda's ex-roommate Carrie is hired to decorate Terrence's new house, and tries to make a play for him.
25	25	"Irreconcilable Similarities"	Nancy Malone	Charles Pratt, Jr.	March 3, 1993	2392025	12.0
Billy and Amanda bicker constantly after he moves in with her. Alison quits her job and decides to move to Seattle with Keith. Billy confronts Amanda after she insults Alison at her farewell party. Amanda sarcastically wonders if Billy would rather be with Alison. Billy breaks up with Amanda and moves out. He drives Alison and Keith to the airport, but then pleads with Alison to stay in Los Angeles. She tells him that it is too late to change her mind, and leaves. Michael's college friend Sam makes a pass at Jane after they have dinner together. Michael is livid when Sam--not Jane--is the one to tell him about the incident. Kimberly offers to "comfort" him. Rob Estes, who appears in a guest role as Michael's college friend Sam Towler, was married to Josie Bissett. He later became a regular cast member as Kyle McBride.
26	26	"End Game"	James Frawley	Frank South	March 24, 1993	2392026	12.6
Billy's father dies of a heart attack. Amanda tries to exploit Billy's vulnerable state to seduce him, and then shows up at the funeral in an attempt to score points with her ex. Alison flies back from Seattle to comfort Billy. Billy feels that he let his father down, and decides to take over the furniture store. His mother says that she has sold the store to the employees, and that she wants Billy to use his writing gifts. She gives Billy a letter in which his father expressed his pride in him. Billy drives Alison to the airport, but she decides to move back to Los Angeles. Michael tries to convince Kimberly to move in with Billy, but she declines. She explains that seeing the death of his father reminded her of how much involvement she would have in his life if they were roommates. Michael lies about going to the hospital and instead helps Kimberly with a plumbing problem. She offers him dinner and tries to come on to him, but he resists. Billy's family tragedy prompts Matt to attempt to repair his own relationship with his father. Rhonda fears that she is losing Terrence to Carrie. Although she asks him to fire Carrie, Terrence convinces her to do it herself.
27	27	"The Test"	Paul Lazarus	Darren Star	March 31, 1993	2392027	11.4
Jake and Jo are forced to submit to AIDS tests after his ex-girlfriend Peri reveals that she is HIV positive. Unable to cope with their anxiety, Jake and Jo take off on his bike and spend the night in the desert. He apologizes for the situation, and they confess their love. They declare that they will appreciate their lives more, regardless of the test results. Their tests come back negative, and Jake offers his support to Peri. Billy uses an embellished résumé to win a job at Escapade Magazine. His boss, Nancy, develops a crush on him. Alison returns to D&D and begs for her old job. Unfortunately, Amanda is in charge of hiring for the position. She lets Alison work as a receptionist, until Lucy forces her to re-hire Alison. Amanda continues to treat Alison badly, but denies that it has anything to do with Billy.
28	28	"Pushing Boundaries"	Marty Pasetta	Jordan Budde	April 7, 1993	2392028	10.4
One of Billy's co-workers discovers that he lied on his résumé, and reports him to Nancy. Nancy assures Billy that she hired him for his talent, and gives him a writing assignment. After he does a great job with an article about a dog wedding, she promotes him to staff writer. Amanda continues to give Alison a hard time at the office, so Alison retaliates by erasing Amanda's messages to Billy. Amanda crashes a celebration dinner for Billy and lets him know that she has been calling. Alison takes Billy out to lunch and grows concerned by the amount of personal attention Nancy is showing him. She warns that Nancy may be attracted to Billy, but he takes offense to this. Alison makes a special dinner for Billy and apologizes, but he ignores her and goes back to the office. Nancy makes a pass at him, and takes away his promotion after he turns her down. He threatens to quit, but his lecture inspires her to apologize and restore him to staff writer. Michael grows more concerned by his attraction to Kimberly. She confesses her love to him, and they kiss in the hospital parking lot. Michael gives Jane the cold shoulder, and later goes to Kimberly's place and begins an affair with her. Matt gets a date with a lawyer, but the man turns out to be an egomaniac who only cares about material items. Rhonda annoys Matt by pushing him to give the guy another chance. He says that the fact that he is gay doesn't mean he has to settle for just anyone.
29	29	"Pas de Trois"	Chip Chalmers	Charles Pratt, Jr.	April 28, 1993	2392029	11.6
Michael and Kimberly have sex in an elevator at the hospital. Alison later sees them making out in the hospital parking lot after her doctor's appointment. Alison confronts him, but he warns her to mind her own business. Kay sends a burned-out Jane off to have lunch with Michael. Jane learns that he is eating down the street from the hospital, and finds him dining with Kimberly. Kimberly feels uncomfortable after this, and wants to end the affair. Michael spends his day off at the beach with Kimberly, who decides that she will take whatever time she can spend with him. When Jane calls the hospital, she is surprised to learn that he is not on call. She later finds sand in his shoes. Amanda propositions Billy at Lucy's engagement party, and Alison becomes jealous after seeing Amanda kiss him. Jo advises Alison to make a move on Billy, but Amanda invites him to her house before she has the chance. He comes home and wakes up Alison to assure her that he didn't sleep with Amanda. Amanda says that Alison is in love with Billy, and taunts her for being gutless. When Billy comes home from work that night, Alison greets him with a passionate kiss. Jake and Jo bicker over her preparation of the bike shop's taxes. He blames her for the fact that they owe over $8000. Jo cheats so that they will owe nothing, but they feel guilty and plead with the mailman to let them have their return out of the box.
30	30	"Carpe Diem"	Richard Lang	Frank South & Darren Star	May 5, 1993	2392030	14.8
Billy and Alison's first real date is a disaster, as she is fretting about Michael's affair and he has only one thing on his mind. Before they can try again, Alison is called away to a work retreat in Palm Springs. Michael has Kimberly beep him during his anniversary dinner with Jane because he decides he would rather sleep with Kimberly. On her way out, Alison tells Jane about Michael and Kimberly, but she doesn't believe her. Michael denies everything and tries to plant doubts about Alison, but Jane later catches him at Kimberly's apartment. Alison and Amanda come to a truce after Amanda shares her feelings about Alison's interference in her relationship with Billy. Jake loans Billy a motorcycle so that he can surprise Alison in Palm Springs. Amanda mistakenly receives a note from Billy intended for Alison. She tries to send him away, claiming that Alison is on probation at work and cannot see visitors for fear of losing her job. Alison goes to the parking lot to retrieve something for Lucy, and runs into Billy. They check into the hotel and consummate their relationship. Jo befriends a famous model and spends a lot of time partying with her. Jake doesn't like the woman's influence on Jo, but Jo believes he is just jealous of the fact that she is making connections and advancing her career.
31	31	"State of Need"	Paul Lazarus	Charles Pratt, Jr.	May 12, 1993	2392031	14.0
Billy and Alison's new relationship is torn apart when Amanda discovers that she is pregnant with his child. She insists that he is not obligated to take care of her, but he feels that he must take responsibility for his child. Michael breaks off his affair with Kimberly, and enlists Alison's help to arrange a meeting with Jane. He begs Jane to give him another chance, and she agrees to attend couples' therapy. Jo's nights out partying with Karen come to an end after she makes passes at both Jake and Jo.
32	32	"Suspicious Minds"	James Frawley	Darren Star & Frank South	May 26, 1993	2392032	13.2
The apartment building goes up for sale. Lucy resigns from D&D, and tells Amanda and Alison that promotions may be in their future. Amanda asks Alison to keep her pregnancy under wraps, but Alison lets it slip while out drinking with a colleague to make Billy jealous. Amanda denies the man's allegations. She later suffers a miscarriage while working late with Alison. Billy and Amanda grow closer as he consoles her, and he is torn between the two women. An unidentified individual begins harassing Alison. Keith returns to Los Angeles, completely obsessed with Alison. Michael and Jane rekindle their romance during a weekend getaway. Jo tries to dodge Jake's discussions of commitment. She is arrested for carrying a concealed weapon while working on a photo essay about the homeless. Jake is enraged to learn that she went back on her promise to get rid of the gun. Rhonda proposes to Terrence. Keith stakes out Alison's apartment, and attacks Billy from behind with a tire iron. While Billy is in the hospital, Keith shows up to console Alison. Billy tells Amanda that he is in love with Alison. Jane confronts Kimberly at the hospital, and learns that Michael hasn't broken off the affair. Billy and Alison come home to learn that Amanda and her father have purchased the building. Final appearance of Vanessa Williams as Rhonda Blair.
