= Craig Detweiler =

American academic and filmmaker

Craig Detweiler (born 1964) is a writer, filmmaker, and cultural commentator. He is dean of the College of Arts and Media at Grand Canyon University in Phoenix, Arizona.

== Early life and career ==
Detweiler grew up in Charlotte, North Carolina. He is a Phi Beta Kappa graduate from Davidson College with a B.A. in English. He went on to receive a Master of Fine Arts from the University of Southern California's School of Cinema/TV. Later he received a Masters of Divinity and PhD in theology and culture at Fuller Theological Seminary. While at Fuller, he co-founded the Windrider Forum, a "vehicle to promote the presentation and exploration of the human story through film and visual media". He served as associate professor and chair of the Mass Communication Department at Biola University in La Mirada, California. Detweiler also served as professor of communication at Pepperdine University in Malibu, California. In 2016, Variety recognized Detweiler as the Mentor of the Year.

== Screenplays ==
As a screenwriter, he has written over ten feature-length screenplays, including The Duke (1999) for Buena Vista and the road trip comedy Extreme Days (2001). In 1996, he directed a documentary, Williams Syndrome: A Highly Musical Species, which premiered at the Boston Film Festival.

== Books ==
Detweiler's first book, co-written with Barry Taylor, was A Matrix of Meanings: Finding God in Pop Culture, dealing with relationships between advertising, movies, music, TV and the divine. Other Detweiler books include: Into the Dark: Seeing the Sacred in the Top Films of the 21st Century (2008), discussing contemporary film from a social, cultural, and theological perspective; A Purple State of Mind: Finding Middle Ground in a Divided Culture, a companion piece to his documentary film Purple State of Mind; iGods: How Technology Shapes our Spiritual and Social Lives (2013), a theology of technology, internet and social media. Selfies: Searching for the Image of God in a Digital Age (2018) received an Award of Merit for the best books in Culture and the Arts from Christianity Today. He has also edited two collections of essays, Halos and Avatars: Playing Video Games with God and Don't Stop Believin': Pop Culture and Religion from Ben-Hur to Zombies.

== Films ==
In 2008, Detweiler produced and directed a documentary, Purple State of Mind which explores the blue state/red state tension in the United States. In 2013, Detweiler produced and directed a documentary, unCommon Sounds which brought musicians to Lebanon and Indonesia to build sustainable peace through music. It premiered on ABC's "Visions and Values" series.

== Selected works ==
- Honest Creativity: The Foundations of Boundless, Good, and Inspired Innovation, Morehouse Publishing, 2024
- Deep Focus: Film and Theology in Dialogue, with Robert K. Johnston and Kutter Callaway, Baker Academic, 2019
- Selfies: Searching for the Image of God in a Digital Age, Brazos Press, 2018
- iGods: How Technology Shapes Our Spiritual and Social Lives, Brazos Press, 2013
- Don't Stop Believin': Pop Culture and Religion from Ben-Hur to Zombies—Co-editor, Westminster John Knox, 2012
- Halos and Avatars: Playing Video Games with God—Editor, Westminster John Knox, 2010
- Into the Dark: Seeing the Sacred in the Top Films of the 21st Century—Baker Academic, 2008
- A Purple State of Mind: Finding Middle Ground in a Divided Culture—Conversant Life, 2008
- A Matrix of Meanings: Finding God in Pop Culture, co-written with Barry Taylor—Baker Academic, 2003
- "The Wire: Playing the Game" in Small Screen, Big Picture: Television and Lived Religion -- Diane Winston, editor, Baylor University Press, 2009
- "Christianity and Film" in Routledge Companion to Religion and Film—John Lyden, editor, 2009

== Affiliations and awards ==
- American Academy of Religion, "Religion, Film and Visual Group," steering committee, 2007–2012
- Audience Award, "Purple State of Mind," Tallahassee Film Festival, 2009
- Best Spiritual Film, "Purple State of Mind," Breckenridge Festival of Film, 2008
- Finalist, Book of the Year, Into the Dark, Collide Magazine, 2008
- Finalist, Gold Medallion in Theology, A Matrix of Meanings, 2004
- Cine Golden Eagle, "Williams Syndrome", 1996
- Silver Award, Feature Documentary, "Williams Syndrome," WorldFest Charleston, 1996
- Crystal Heart Award, "Williams Syndrome," Heartland Film Festival, 1996
