= Cassidy Rae =

American actress

Cassidy Rae Unruh
- Born: Cassidy Rae Joyce; June 7, 1976 (age 49); Tucson, Arizona, U.S.
- Other names: Cassidy Rae, Cassidy Unruh
- Years active: 1992–2001, 2011-13
- Notable work: Sarah Owens in Models Inc.; Davina Mayhan in My Family And Me
- Spouse: Andrew Towns (2000 –? ) Dr. Chase Unruh (Current)

Cassidy Rae Joyce (born June 7, 1976) is a retired American actress.

Rae starred in the made-for-television movie Crowned and Dangerous with Yasmine Bleeth in 1997. She is best known for her roles as Sarah Owens on Models Inc. (1994) and as Trudy Tucker on Hyperion Bay (1998).

== Early life and family ==
The daughter of Ray and Amy Joyce, Cassidy Rae Joyce was born on June 7, 1976, in Tucson, Arizona. She and her family moved to Lake County, Florida, when she was about 6 years old, and she was raised in Clermont, Florida. Her mother showed an agent pictures of Rae, and that led to her modeling and working in commercials for Rooms to Go, Coca-Cola, and other companies. She attended Groveland Middle School.

Rae has a brother and a sister. When she was growing up, her parents had cattle and crops on a 35-acre farm.They eventually moved to California. After one year in a public high school, she was home-schooled to allow time for her to take acting classes and participate in Little Theatre activities. She and her mother moved to Los Angeles in 1992 so that she could seek work in Hollywood.

== Career ==
Rae had the recurring role of Sarah Owens on Melrose Place, a character she continued in the spin-off Models Inc.

In 2011, after taking a ten-year break to get married and start a family, Rae starred in the short film "Swordbearer". Two years later, she starred in another short film, "Fluffy 1947".

== Filmography ==
=== Film ===
Year	Title	Role	Notes
1995	Evolver	Jamie Saunders	
2001	Extreme Days	Jessie	
2011	Swordbearer	Joilin Thran	Short film
2013	Fluffy 1947	Soldier	Short film

=== Television ===
Year	Title	Role	Notes
1992	Clarissa Explains It All	Elise Quackenbush	Episode: "Sam in Love"
1993	Angel Falls	Molly Harrison	TV series
1993	Days of Our Lives	Karen Foster	TV series
1994	The Byrds of Paradise	Math Tutor	Episode: "This Band Is My Band"
1994	Melrose Place	Sarah Owens	Recurring role (4 episodes)
1994–1995	Models Inc.	Sarah Owens	Main role (29 episodes)
1995	Favorite Deadly Sins	Norma Jean Hazelrigg	TV film
1996	The Single Guy	Nikki Gordon	Episode: "Nineteen"
1996	Lying Eyes	Amy Miller	TV film
1997	Swearing Allegiance	Adrianne Jones	TV film
1997	Journey of the Heart	Julia	TV film
1997	Crowned and Dangerous	Shauna Langley	TV film
1998–1999	Hyperion Bay	Trudy Tucker	Main role (17 episodes)
1999	Crime in Connecticut: The Story of Alex Kelly	Carrie Roberts	TV film
2000	Brutally Normal	Kate Miller	Episode: "You Get What You Get"
2000	Just Shoot Me!	Kaylene	Episodes: "Prescription for Love", "Paradise by the Dashboard Light"
2000	Rude Awakening	Heidi	Episode: "Full House"
2000	Zoe, Duncan, Jack and Jane	Ellen	Episode: "Desperately Seeking Zoe"
