= Skip Hollandsworth =

American screenwriter

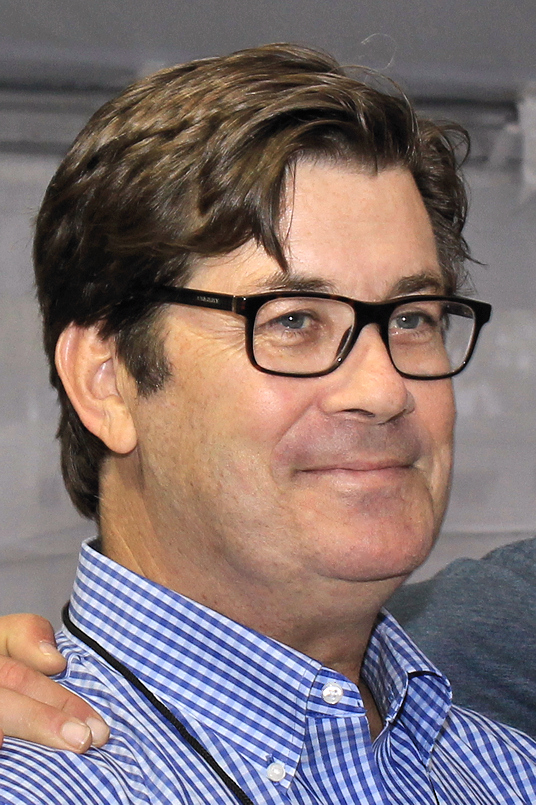
- Hollandsworth at the 2016 Texas Book Festival
- Born: Walter Ned Hollandsworth; 1957 or 1958; Kannapolis, North Carolina, United States
- Occupations: Journalist, screenwriter
- Spouse: Shannon Hollandsworth
- Children: 2
- Writing career
- Period: 1979–present

Walter Ned "Skip" Hollandsworth (born 1957 or 1958) is an American writer, journalist, and screenwriter who has worked since 1989 for Texas Monthly magazine, where he is a former executive editor. In 2010, he won the National Magazine Award for Feature Writing from the American Society of Magazine Editors, for "Still Life", the story of John McClamrock, and he co-wrote the Richard Linklater movie Bernie (2011) based on his 1998 article titled "Midnight in the Garden of East Texas".

== Early life ==
Hollandsworth was born in Kannapolis, North Carolina, the son of Walter Ned Hollandsworth, a Presbyterian minister, and his wife, Peggy Hollandsworth. He has two sisters. He grew up in Lexington, Kentucky, where his father was the pastor at Meadowthorpe Presbyterian Church from December 1961 to December 1968, and then in Wichita Falls, Texas, where his father served as pastor of Fain Memorial Presbyterian Church.

Hollandsworth's father, uncles and grandfather graduated from the Union Presbyterian Seminary in Richmond, Virginia. His family assumed that he, too, would become a Presbyterian minister, but Hollandsworth, a self-described "scamp", later wrote in Texas Monthly that, "As minister's children, we could not help but be fascinated yet repelled by church ways." He became fascinated with North Texas State Hospital, a state-owned in-patient mental health facility in Wichita Falls; in the June 2010 issue of Texas Monthly, Hollandsworth wrote about riding past the state hospital in the back of a pickup truck with his friends on Friday nights, looking for patients. "For us, the state hospital, which nearly everyone referred to as LSU, or Lakeside University, because it was located across from Lake Wichita, was our real-life haunted house. The fact that two thousand adults were being treated for 'insanity' out in those buildings, just past the city limits sign, simply tortured our imaginations." He volunteered there, and while talking to a college class, had a sudden insight that those trips to the state hospital had started him on the path to being a journalist. "Although this had never occurred to me before, ... I realized that what I loved about my visits was that I got the chance to study people who went right up to the line of normal behavior—and then, inexplicably, stepped over it. I was captivated by the patients and tried to fathom what it felt like to be swept away by madness." His interest in true crime was piqued by the shooting deaths of oilman Bobbie Burns and his wife Abbie in Wichita Falls in 1974, which the coroner suggested might be a murder-suicide.

== Education ==
A cellist, Hollandsworth won a music scholarship to Texas Christian University, but changed his major to English; he graduated in 1979. He wrote for the school newspaper, The Daily Skiff, first opinion columns, then as a sports reporter covering the football team (although he said in a 2011 interview that he "found the cheerleaders far more interesting than the games themselves"), and finally feature stories, since he enjoyed interviewing people about their lives.

== Career ==
Hollandsworth began working as a reporter and columnist at the Dallas Morning News while still a student. He later moved to the Dallas Times Herald and also wrote for D Magazine and made sports documentaries for NBC. He joined Texas Monthly in 1989, and was executive editor.

=== Journalism ===
Hollandsworth wrote many celebrity profiles for Dallas newspapers, and since joining Texas Monthly, where he has profiled Farrah Fawcett, Kelly Clarkson, and Troy Aikman, among others, for other magazines including Glamour and Women's Health.

He published his first long-form true crime article in Texas Monthly in 1993, on Charles Albright, and has since become best known for this genre. His true crime writing has been recognized by Byliner, Longform and Best American Crime Writing.

Hollandsworth was interviewed for the podcast Criminal in their episode "Cowboy Bob" about the bank robber Peggy Jo Tallas.

His 2009 article on the life of John McClamrock, "Still Life", won the National Magazine Award for Feature Writing in 2010, the first for Texas Monthly.

=== Screenwriting and screen adaptations ===
Richard Linklater's crime comedy Bernie, which had its world premiere at the 2011 Los Angeles Film Festival is based on a 1998 Texas Monthly article by Hollandsworth titled "Midnight in the Garden of East Texas" and was co-written by Linklater and Hollandsworth. Regarding the writing of Bernie, Hollandsworth told an interviewer that Linklater insisted the screenplay stick to the truth: "I began writing these scenes that I thought were fantastic. My creative side was coming out. But whenever I did that, Rick would ask – in that gentle, loving way of his – 'Did that really happen?' And when I said it didn't, he'd say, 'Hell, no.'

Linklater's 2023 film Hit Man is also based on an article by Hollandsworth, with the setting moved from Houston to New Orleans. Three made-for-TV movies have also been based on his articles: Love's Deadly Triangle: The Texas Cadet Murder (NBC, 1997), The Almost Perfect Bank Robbery (CBS, 1999, relocated from San Antonio to North Carolina), and Suburban Madness (CBS, 2004, based on the murder of David Lynn Harris). Movies have been proposed about the Goree Girls and on John McClamrock based on his "Still Life".

=== Books ===
The Midnight Assassin is a true crime history about a series of murders by the so-called Servant Girl Annihilator that took place in Austin, Texas, in 1885, which Scotland Yard detectives later speculated were by the same person as the murders in Whitechapel, London, attributed to Jack the Ripper. Published in April 2016 by Henry Holt and Company, the book was described by The New York Times as "true crime of high quality", "smart and restrained" and "chilling", and was named a New York Times bestseller in May 2016. In its review, the Wall Street Journal called the book a "thoroughly researched, excitingly written history" and an "absorbing work".

She Kills is a collection of articles about Texas female criminals that Hollandsworth first published in Texas Monthly, and to which he has added updates. It was published in October 2025 by Harper and was described by a reviewer for USA Today as "a jaw-dropping, addictively readable compendium".

He has also worked as a ghostwriter of both books and articles.

== Awards ==
In addition to the 2010 National Magazine Award for Feature Writing for "Still Life", Hollandsworth has received the National Headliner Award, the John Hancock Award for excellence in business and financial journalism, the City and Regional Magazine Association gold award for feature writing, the Texas Institute of Letters O. Henry award for magazine writing, and the Austin Headliners club's Charles Green Award for outstanding magazine writing in Texas. He has been a finalist four times for the National Magazine Awards.

== Personal life ==
Hollandsworth is married to Shannon Hollandsworth; he has a daughter and a stepdaughter.
