= John McClamrock =

American football player, paralyzed (1956–2008)

John McClamrock with his mother, Ann

McClamrock as a high school American football player

John McClamrock (March 24, 1956 – March 18, 2008) was a Dallas high school American football player who received media attention and sympathy from many Americans after an accident that left him with bedridden with near-total paralysis in 1973.

== Background ==
“Mrs. Nixon and I were deeply saddened to learn of the tragic accident which you suffered,” he began, “but we understand that you are a very brave young man and that your courage at this difficult time inspires all who know you. You have a devoted family and many friends cheering for you, and we are proud to join them in sending warm wishes to you always.”

— President Nixon’s note to McClamrock, November 10, 1973

McClamrock, a resident of Preston Hollow, attended Hillcrest High School. On October 17, 1973, an accident during a football game led to a severe injury in which he was paralyzed from the neck down. McClamrock’s spinal cord was severely damaged and he could not be placed in a wheelchair since it could drop his blood pressure. Hundreds of Hillcrest students visited him at Presbyterian Hospital following his injury. Various Dallas-area schools held benefit games in honor of McClamrock. Local newspapers covered McClamrock's story. The owner of the area Bonanza Steakhouse chain held a "Johnny McClamrock Day" in which 10% of sales were given to a medical fund. Hillcrest High School held numerous benefit events in his honor. McClamrock received get-well cards from people across the United States. He was moved to the Texas Institute for Rehabilitation and Research in December. However, by spring 1974, despite two hours of physical therapy daily, there was no improvement regarding his muscle condition. His condition prevented him from being placed in an upright position. President Richard Nixon sent McClamrock a condolence letter. For the rest of his life, McClamrock's mother, Ann Logan "Pretty Annie" McClamrock, cared for him. McClamrock, with assistance from family members and tutors, graduated from high school in 1975. He lived in the same neighborhood for the remainder of his life, under the care of his mother Ann. She found part-time work at an answering service to support the family. His father died in 1978 after a battle with emphysema. McClamrock suffered from several medical conditions as well: had developed urinary tract infections that would nearly kill him as well as a bedsore that required plastic surgery. Later in his life, new, wealthier residents who moved into the area and replaced people who knew McClamrock were initially unaware of McClamrock's presence and story.

== Death and aftermath ==
McClamrock died from respiratory issues at Kindred Hospital in Dallas on March 18, 2008, at age 51. He had developed several bedsores and was admitted into rehab. He developed a fever but was unable to cough. Ann died nearly 2 months later on May 13, 2008, at the age of 89.McClamrock's brother, Henry, said that his mother decided that "her job was finished." In November 2010 Ann was named the Youth Sports Hero of the Month by Douglas E. Abrams on the website MomsTeam.com.

In June 2011 the Dallas Independent School District (DISD) board voted against renaming the Franklin Stadium at Hillcrest after John McClamrock. However, in 2025, the board voted to the name the stadium after him.

== Television and film ==
The 1976 Six Million Dollar Man episode "The Bionic Boy", about an injured young athlete who receives bionic implants, is a reference and tribute to John McClamrock, who had been prominently in the news during that period.

On May 8, 2010, the NFL Network aired a feature called A Still Life on John and his mother Ann McClamrock for their NFL Total Access: Week in Review television show. Billy Bob Thornton narrated.

It has been announced that George Robinson will play John in the film Still Life, based on the Texas Monthly non-fiction article of the same name written by Skip Hollandsworth in 2009, about John and his mother Ann.
