= Marilyn Kagan =

American actress (1951–2020)

- Born: June 12, 1951; New York City, New York, US
- Died: September 10, 2020 (aged 69)
- Education: Arizona State University; San Diego State University
- Occupations: Actress; psychotherapist
- Years active: 1980–1996 (as actress)

Marilyn Kagan (June 12, 1951 – September 10, 2020) was an American psychotherapist and actress. She was best known for her role in Adrian Lyne's 1980 film Foxes and host of the Marilyn Kagan Show.

== Biography ==
Kagan was born in Flushing, Queens in New York City, on June 12, 1951. When she was eight years old, she relocated with her family to Scottsdale, Arizona.

Kagan studied at Arizona State University, where she majored in psychology, before earning a Master's degree in social work from San Diego State University. She appeared in several local stage productions while completing her studies, but intended to pursue a doctoral degree in social work at that time.

Kagan made her feature film debut in Adrian Lyne's Foxes (1980), a coming-of-age drama about a group of teenage girls in Los Angeles, in which she starred opposite Jodie Foster, Cherie Currie, and Scott Baio. At the time of her casting, Kagan was working as a social worker for youth. She followed this with roles in the television films A Perfect Match (1980) and The Violation of Sarah McDavid (1981). In 1984, she had a supporting role in the slasher film The Initiation opposite Daphne Zuniga, and next appeared in the rape and revenge film The Ladies Club (1986).

She also guest-starred on several television series, including Mork & Mindy in 1981, Hart to Hart in 1983, Married... with Children in 1993, and Ellen in 1996.

Between 1994 and 1995, after having established a career as a psychotherapist, Kagan hosted the Marilyn Kagan Show, in which she helped a variety of individuals with varying psychological issues.

Kagan died of cancer on September 10, 2020, at the age of 69.

== Filmography ==
Year	Title	Role	Notes	Ref.
1980	Foxes	Madge Axman		
1980	A Perfect Match	Lisa	Television film	
1981	The Violation of Sarah McDavid	Nan	Television film	
1984	The Initiation	Marcia		
1986	The Ladies Club	Rosalie		
