= Janet Greek =

American director and screenwriter

- Born: 1949 (age 76–77); Timmins, Ohio, U.S.
- Occupations: Film director, television director, television writer, and author
- Years active: 1984–present

Janet Greek (born 1949 in Timmins, Ohio) is an American director and writer of film and television. She is best known for her directorial work on the science fiction series Babylon 5.

== Career ==
As a television director, Greek's credits include St. Elsewhere, L.A. Law, Max Headroom, The Outsiders, Over My Dead Body, Northern Exposure, The Burning Zone, Melrose Place, Xena: Warrior Princess, and the Babylon 5 spin-off Crusade. She also wrote two episodes of the series Renegade.

In 1983, Greek directed the music video for "Ricky", "Weird Al" Yankovic's first official music video.

In 1986, she made her feature film directorial debut directing the film The Ladies Club (credited as A.K. Allen) starring Karen Austin and Diana Scarwid, followed by the film Spellbinder (1988) starring Tim Daly and Kelly Preston. She previously directed a short film entitled Just My Luck (1984).

In 2006, Greek published her first book entitled The Divorce Planner: Self-defense for Women When They Need It Most. She wrote the book after going through two divorces and the stress she encountered not being prepared for them.

In recent years, Greek has taught seminars on directing and screenwriting at universities in the United States and Canada. She is a member of both the Directors Guild of America and the Writers Guild of America.
