= The Ladies Club =

- Directed by: Janet Greek
- Screenplay by: Fran Lewis Ebeling; Paul Mason
- Based on: The Sisterhood by Casey Bishop and Betty Black
- Produced by: Paul Mason; Nick J. Mileti
- Starring: Karen Austin; Diana Scarwid; Christine Belford
- Edited by: Marion Segal; Randall Torno
- Music by: Lalo Schifrin
- Distributed by: New Line Cinema
- Release date: April 1986
- Running time: 85 mins
- Country: United States
- Language: English

The Ladies Club is a 1986 American rape and revenge film directed by Janet Greek (under the pseudonym A.K. Allen), and starring Karen Austin, Diana Scarwid, Christine Belford and Bruce Davison. It follows a Los Angeles policewoman who, after being raped, bands together with other rape victims, forming a group that collectively begin hunting rapists. The script by Fran Lewis Ebeling and Paul Mason was based on Casey Bishop and Betty Black's novel, The Sisterhood.

== Plot ==
Joan Taylor is a Los Angeles policewoman who gets gang-raped by a trio of burglars in her own house. When the three rapists get caught, go to trial and are acquitted due to a legal technicality, Joan goes to women's support meetings. There, she forms an alliance with a resident doctor Constance Lewis, whose daughter was raped and killed by a sex offender, as well as a few other rape victims. Joan takes charge of the group and leads them out to abduct and surgically castrate rapists who have gotten away with the crime. But each of the ladies' personal problems soon get in the way.

== Cast ==
- Karen Austin as Joan Taylor
- Diana Scarwid as Lucy Bricker
- Christine Belford as Constance Lewis
- Bruce Davison as Richard Harrison
- Shera Danese as Eva
- Beverly Todd as Georgiane
- Marilyn Kagan as Rosalie
- Kit McDonough as Carol
- Arliss Howard as Ed Bricker
- Randee Heller as Harriet
- Paul Carafotes as Eddie
- Nicholas Worth as Jack Dwyer
- Scott Lincoln as Pete Campanella
- Largo Woodruff as Terry
- James LeGros as Jesse
- Elizabeth Arlen as Rochelle
- Carol Baxter as Jill
- Tina Lifford as Patty
- James Avery as Joe
- Nicholas Guest as Larry

== Release and reception ==
Greek had her name listed as "A.K. Allen" due to complaints over the way the finished film was marketed. Lead actress Karen Austin also complained about New Line's advertisements: "I think the way the film is being marketed is tacky," she said, referring to taglines like "Men who attack women have two big problems. The Ladies Club is about to remove them both."

Critical reception for the film was mixed, with critics praising the film for its feminist slant but criticizing it for its flat tone. At the time of its release, film critic Carrie Rickey dubbed the film "the first feminist exploitation movie." "It corrects the twisted relationship between the viewer and viewed," she noted.
