= Spaceballs =

1987 American comedy film by Mel Brooks

- Theatrical release poster by John Alvin
- Directed by: Mel Brooks
- Written by: Mel Brooks; Thomas Meehan; Ronny Graham
- Produced by: Mel Brooks; Ezra Swerdlow
- Starring: Mel Brooks; John Candy; Rick Moranis; Bill Pullman; Daphne Zuniga; Dick Van Patten; George Wyner; Joan Rivers
- Cinematography: Nick McLean
- Edited by: Conrad Buff IV
- Music by: John Morris
- Production companies: Metro-Goldwyn-Mayer; Brooksfilms
- Distributed by: MGM/UA Communications Co.
- Release date: June 24, 1987
- Running time: 96 minutes
- Country: United States
- Language: English
- Budget: $22.7 million
- Box office: $40.3 million

Spaceballs is a 1987 American space opera comedy film co-produced, co-written, and directed by Mel Brooks. It primarily parodies the original Star Wars trilogy, but also other popular franchises such as Star Trek, Alien, The Wizard of Oz, 2001: A Space Odyssey, Planet of the Apes, and Transformers. The film stars Bill Pullman, John Candy, Rick Moranis and Daphne Zuniga, with the supporting cast including Dick Van Patten, George Wyner, Lorene Yarnell, and the voice of Joan Rivers. In addition to Brooks playing a dual role, the film features Brooks regulars Dom DeLuise and Rudy De Luca in cameo appearances.

In Spaceballs, heroic mercenary Lone Starr (Pullman) and his alien sidekick Barf (Candy) rescue Princess Vespa (Zuniga) of the planet Druidia and her droid, Dot Matrix (Yarnell, voiced by Rivers), from being captured by the Spaceballs, led by President Skroob (Brooks), who wants to use Vespa as ransom to obtain Druidia's air for their own planet. However, the heroes get stranded on a desert moon, where they encounter the wise Yogurt (also Brooks), who teaches Starr about the metaphysical power known as "the Schwartz." Meanwhile, Spaceball commanders Dark Helmet (Moranis) and Colonel Sandurz (Wyner) lead the search for them, but are hindered by their own incompetence.

The film was released by MGM/UA Communications Co. on June 24, 1987. It received mixed reviews upon release, but has since attained a cult following. A sequel, Spaceballs: The New One, is scheduled to be released theatrically by Amazon MGM Studios in 2027; it is directed by Josh Greenbaum and co-written by Josh Gad and Brooks, and will star Lewis Pullman, Keke Palmer, and Gad, with Brooks, Bill Pullman, Moranis, Wyner, and Zuniga reprising their roles.

== Plot ==
In a galaxy "very, very, very, very far away", the ruthless Spaceballs, led by President Skroob, have squandered their planet's atmosphere. Desperate for oxygen, Skroob hatches a plan to steal it from the neighboring planet Druidia by obtaining the code to its air shield, destroying Druidia in the process.

On Druidia, the spoiled Princess Vespa flees an arranged marriage to the narcoleptic Prince Valium, having already rejected all other suitors in her search for true love. Meanwhile, mercenary Lone Starr and his half-man, half-dog companion Barf are contacted by crime boss Pizza the Hutt, who demands repayment of a one-million space buck debt. King Roland of Druidia offers Starr the same amount to rescue Vespa and her droid servant, Dot Matrix.

Aboard their Winnebago RV spaceship Eagle 5, Starr and Barf rescue the pair just before they are captured by the Spaceball ship Spaceball One, commanded by Colonel Sandurz and Skroob's enforcer, Dark Helmet, who wields the mystical power of the Schwartz. However, Eagle 5 runs out of fuel, forcing Starr to crash-land on the desert moon of Vega.

The four wander through the scorching landscape, with Starr and Vespa exchanging barbed remarks and mutual attraction. They cannot act on their feelings, however, as Vespa is duty-bound to marry a prince. They collapse from the heat, but are rescued by the Dink-Dinks, a group of robed, diminutive aliens, and taken to the hidden temple of Yogurt, a wise sage who breaks the fourth wall to advertise fictitious Spaceballs tie-in merchandise. Yogurt guides Starr in using the Schwartz and a ring to channel its power. He also deciphers Starr's medallion–found with him as an abandoned baby–but withholds its meaning.

Meanwhile, Helmet, having tracked Vespa's location using an instant VHS of Spaceballs, uses the Schwartz to disguise himself as Roland to lure her out of Yogurt's temple for capture. Helmet extorts the shield code from Roland by threatening to reverse the plastic surgery on Vespa's nose. Starr and Barf infiltrate the Planet Spaceball prison, rescue Vespa and Dot, and escape in Eagle 5.

With the shield code in hand, Spaceball One transforms into "Mega-Maid", a giant maid robot, and begins vacuuming Druidia's atmosphere. Starr reverses the vacuum by using the Schwartz, saving the planet, then pilots Eagle 5 into Mega-Maid's head, finds the self-destruct button, and battles Helmet in a Schwartz duel using ring-projected lightsaber-like beams. Helmet steals Starr's ring and drops it down a grate, but Starr hears a telepathic message from Yogurt that the Schwartz is in him, not the ring. Starr wields the Schwartz to reflect Helmet's energy blast with a mirror, sending him flying into the self-destruct button. As Eagle 5 escapes, Skroob, Helmet, and Sandurz are left behind when all the escape pods are launched, and Mega-Maid explodes. The trio crash-land in the ship's remains on a nearby planet populated by intelligent apes, who are chagrined to witness their arrival.

Lone Starr and Barf discover on the news that Pizza the Hutt has eaten himself to death, absolving them from their debt. The duo return Vespa and Dot to Roland, but take only a small portion of the reward money to cover their expenses. Later, Starr and Barf discover a final message from Yogurt that reveals Starr's medallion identifies him as a prince. Upon returning to Druidia just in time to stop Vespa's wedding to Valium, Starr reveals his royal lineage and he and Vespa are joyously married.

== Cast ==
- Bill Pullman as Lone Starr, a mercenary who travels the galaxy in his flying 1986 Winnebago Chieftain 33, Eagle 5.
- John Candy as Barf, a "Mawg" (half man, half dog) and Lone Starr's partner
- Daphne Zuniga as Princess Vespa of Planet Druidia
- Rick Moranis as Lord Dark Helmet, the short-statured, bratty, and childish assistant leader of Planet Spaceball and the Spaceballs' chief enforcer, who can wield the "down-side" of the Schwartz
- Joan Rivers as the voice of Dot Matrix, Princess Vespa's droid of honor and guardian
  - Lorene Yarnell provided Dot Matrix's on-screen physical performance
- Mel Brooks as:
  - President Skroob, the incompetent leader of Planet Spaceball
  - Yogurt, the wise and powerful keeper of the "up-side" of the Schwartz
- George Wyner as Colonel Sandurz, the commander of Spaceball One
- Dick Van Patten as King Roland, the ruler of Planet Druidia and Princess Vespa's father
- Michael Winslow as a radar technician on Spaceball One who can re-enact the radar's sounds
- Ronny Graham as the minister at the royal wedding
- Jim J. Bullock as Prince Valium, a sleepy prince
- Leslie Bevis as Commanderette Zircon, a minion of President Skroob
- Sandy Helberg as Dr. Irving Schlotkin, a plastic surgeon
- Dom DeLuise as the voice of Pizza the Hutt, a half-man and half-pizza crime boss
  - Richard Karron (original takes) and Rick Lazzarini (reshoots and final takes) portrayed Pizza's on-screen presence. Lazzarini spoke Pizza's lines for the character's on-camera scenes with DeLuise's voice dubbed in later.
- Rudy De Luca as Vinnie, Pizza's robotic subordinate.
- Rhonda Shear as a woman in the diner.
- Jeff MacGregor as Snotty, a minion of President Skroob on Planet Spaceball

Various actors and comedians appear in unnamed roles, with Sal Viscuso, Michael Pniewski, Stephen Tobolowsky, Robert Prescott, Tom Dreesen, Rick Ducommun, Rob Paulsen (who was uncredited), Tommy Swerdlow, and Tim Russ all appearing as soldiers of Dark Helmet. Additional unnamed appearances include Dey Young as a waitress, Jack Riley as a newsman covering the news about Pizza the Hutt's death, Ken Olfson as the head usher, and Bryan O'Byrne as an organist. Brenda Strong appears as Gretchen, Dr. Schlotkin's nurse, alongside Johnny Silver as Arnold, Dr. Schlotkin's caddy. Denise and Dian Gallup appear as Charlene and Marlene, two twin girls in Spaceball City whose names President Skroob keeps mixing up the names for. Ed Gale, Felix Silla, Tony Cox, Antonio Hoyos, Arturo Gil, and John Kennedy Hayden appear as the Dinks while their uncredited voices are provided by Corey Burton, Phil Hartman, Tress MacNeille, John Paragon, and Rob Paulsen. John Hurt makes a cameo appearance as a parody of his character Gilbert Kane in the film Alien (1979). In the same scene archival recordings of William "Bill" Roberts' performance of "Hello! Ma Baby" as heard in the animated short film One Froggy Evening were used as the Xenomorph bursts out of Kane's chest and suddenly breaks into song and dance.

== Production ==
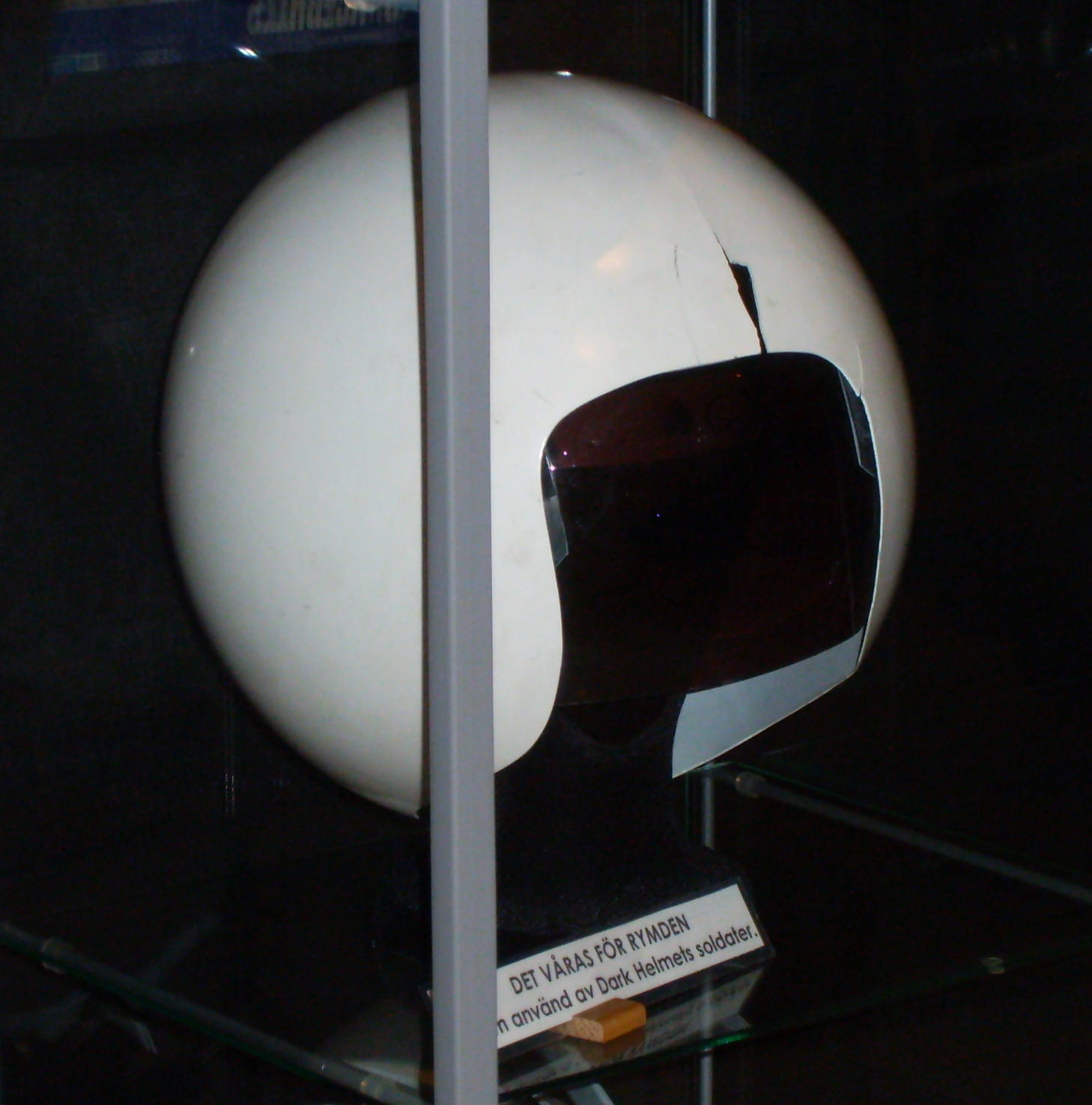
A helmet from the film at a convention in Stockholm

When Brooks developed Spaceballs, he wanted his parody to be as close to the original as possible. Even though the Yogurt character (Mel Brooks) mentions merchandising in the film, Brooks's deal with George Lucas on parodying Star Wars was that no Spaceballs action figures be made. According to Brooks, "[Lucas] said, 'Your [action figures] are going to look like mine.' I said okay." However, this agreement inspired Brooks to write Yogurt's "Merchandising" scene and include multiple Spaceballs-branded products at other points in the film, such as placemats and toilet paper. No mass-produced Spaceballs merchandise was ever created.

Brooks had Lucas's company handle some post-production, saying, "I was playing ball with the people who could have said no." Lucas later sent Brooks a note saying how much he loved the film, including its story structure, and that he "was afraid [he] would bust something from laughing". According to Rick Moranis, "In the original script, the description of [Dark Helmet] was that the whole costume was one gigantic helmet. Then it got scaled back to just an exaggerated version of the Darth Vader helmet."

The bulk of the film's visual effects were executed by Apogee Inc., which was founded by former Industrial Light & Magic employee John Dykstra.

Pullman got the part of Lone Starr when Brooks and his wife Anne Bancroft saw him in a play. Brooks had been unsuccessfully trying to sign on big-name actors such as Tom Cruise and Tom Hanks for the film. Pullman said,

I think [Mel] was hurt that they didn't take him up on it ... but then it attract[ed] two of the big comics at that time: John Candy and Rick Moranis. Once that was secured, then he said, "Heck, I'll get somebody nobody knows!" And I got a chance to do it.

Zuniga initially found Brooks' film parodies "too crass and not too funny" but, after working with Brooks, she said: "I have this image of Mel as totally wacko and out to lunch. And he is. But he's also really perceptive, real sensitive in ways that make actors respond."

== Music ==
Spaceballs: The Soundtrack

Soundtrack album by Various artists
- Released: July 1987
- Genres: Film score; pop rock; hard rock
- Length: 31:08
- Label: Atlantic
- Producers: John Morris; George Duke; Jeffrey Osborne; Bob Ezrin; Jellybean; Richard Perry; Donn Landee; Mick Jones; Van Halen; Michael Lloyd

An official soundtrack was released on Atlantic Records on LP, CD, and cassette, featuring many of the songs heard in the film, as well as three score cues by frequent Brooks collaborator John Morris.

Track listing
No.	Title	Writer(s)	Artist(s)	Length
1.	"Spaceballs Main Title Theme"	John Morris	John Morris	2:30
2.	"My Heart Has a Mind of Its Own"	Gloria Sklerov; Lenny Macaluso	Jeffrey Osborne and Kim Carnes	3:56
3.	"Heartstrings"	John Crawford; Matt Reid; Rob Brill; Terri Nunn	Berlin	4:10
4.	"Spaceballs Love Theme Instrumental"	Morris	John Morris	2:22
5.	"The Winnebago Crashes / The Spaceballs Build Mega-Maid"	Morris	John Morris	2:25
6.	"Spaceballs"	Clyde Lieberman; Jeffrey Pescetto; Mel Brooks	The Spinners	3:43
7.	"Hot Together"	Sharon Robinson	The Pointer Sisters	4:11
8.	"Good Enough"	Edward Van Halen; Alex Van Halen; Michael Anthony; Sammy Hagar	Van Halen	4:02
9.	"Wanna Be Loved by You"	Dick Bauerle	Ladyfire	3:34
Total length:				31:08

"Raise Your Hands" by Bon Jovi is also used prominently in the film.

"My Heart Has a Mind of Its Own" was made into a hit in 1990 by Sally Moore (U.S. AC #42).

In the film, the Dinks (based on Jawas) perform the 1914 marching song "Colonel Bogey March", though they only sing the word "Dink" repeatedly in rhythm to the song rather than whistle, parodying the scene from The Bridge on the River Kwai.

In 2006, La-La Land Records released Spaceballs – The 19th Anniversary Edition CD of the film's score, with bonus tracks of alternate takes and tracks not used in the film.

== Reception and legacy ==
=== Box office ===
The film had an estimated $25.5 million budget, and ultimately grossed $40,306,483 during its run in the United States, taking in $6,613,837 on its opening weekend, finishing behind Dragnet.

=== Critical reception ===
The film received mixed reviews from critics. On the review aggregator website Rotten Tomatoes, 53% of 106 critics' reviews are positive, with an average rating of 5.9/10. The website's consensus reads: "There's fine spoofery and amusing characters in Spaceballs, though it's a far cry from Mel Brooks' peak era." Metacritic, which uses a weighted average, assigned the film a score of 46 out of 100, based on 14 critics, indicating "mixed or average" reviews. Audiences polled by CinemaScore gave the film an average grade of "B−" on an A+ to F scale.

At the time of the film's release, Roger Ebert of the Chicago Sun-Times gave the film 2.5 stars out of 4, and remarked "I enjoyed a lot of the movie, but I kept thinking I was at a revival ... it should have been made several years ago, before our appetite for Star Wars satires had been completely exhausted." Gene Siskel of the Chicago Tribune gave the film 3 out of 4 stars, saying that there were "just enough funny visual gags to recommend this wildly uneven film". Variety said that the film was a misguided parody and not very funny.

The film won Worst Picture at the 1987 Stinkers Bad Movie Awards.

=== Impact ===
The film gained a cult following in the following years.

Tesla has used the film's starship speeds (Light Speed, Ridiculous Speed, Ludicrous Speed, Plaid Speed) as inspiration for naming their acceleration modes. In homage to Spaceballs a Tesla has Ludicrous Mode for acceleration beyond its Insane Mode, and Plaid Mode, overtop Ludicrous.

A clip from the film, alongside clips of other Star Wars parody works, was used in a "special look" internet video used to promote Star Wars: The Rise of Skywalker in order to show the cultural impact of Star Wars.

== Home media ==
Spaceballs was released on VHS and LaserDisc in February 1988. The VHS edition was issued twice, first in a 4:3 aspect ratio and the 1996 edition was presented in widescreen. The 1996 LaserDisc reissue includes a commentary track with Brooks, which was also included on the DVD and Blu-ray releases. The film was released on DVD on April 25, 2000. This version includes a "making of" documentary and booklet. A collectors edition DVD was released on May 3, 2005, with more extras including a video conversation about the making of the film with Brooks and Thomas Meehan. On August 7, 2012, a 25th anniversary edition Blu-ray was released containing many of the same bonus features as the 2005 DVD with the addition of a new featurette. The film was released on Ultra HD Blu-ray and a remastered Blu-ray on April 12, 2021, by Kino Lorber, with all of the special features from previous home video releases included.

== In other media ==
- A novelization for the film was released on June 1, 1987, written by R. L. Stine under the pen name Jovial Bob Stine, based on the script of Mel Brooks, Thomas Meehan, and Ronny Graham.
- In the episode Robot Chicken: Star Wars of the American adult sketch comedy television series Robot Chicken the segment "George Lucas at the Convention" features a Star Wars fan wearing a Barf costume from Spaceballs.
- Moranis vocally reprised his role as Dark Helmet in the episode "Spaceballs" of the American sitcom The Goldbergs.

== Props ==
A 1/12-scale model of the Eagle 5 was auctioned on December 11, 2018. The model was created by film special effects designer Grant McCune, who also created models for Star Wars and Star Trek. The model makes an appearance early in the film with the introduction of Barf and Lone Starr. The model, along with other special effects artifacts from then-current films such as Masters of the Universe and Jaws: The Revenge, was displayed at Chicago's Museum of Science and Industry in the summer of 1988.

== Animated series ==
Spaceballs was developed into an animated television show which debuted in September 2008 as Spaceballs: The Animated Series on G4 (US) and Super Channel (Canada).

== Sequel ==
Spaceballs: The New One, a sequel to Spaceballs, is scheduled to be released on April 23, 2027, distributed by MGM. Produced by Imagine Entertainment, the sequel was directed by Josh Greenbaum based on a screenplay written by Brooks, Josh Gad, Benji Samit and Dan Hernandez. It stars Pullman, Zuniga, Moranis, Wyner, and Brooks reprising their roles from Spaceballs, while including new characters played by Lewis Pullman (Bill Pullman's real-life son) as Lone Starr's and Vespa's son Starburst, Keke Palmer as Destiny, and Gad and Anthony Carrigan in yet-named roles.
