= Far from Home (1989 film) =

1989 film by Meiert Avis

- Theatrical release poster
- Directed by: Meiert Avis
- Screenplay by: Tommy Lee Wallace
- Story by: Ted Gershuny
- Produced by: Donald P. Borchers
- Starring: Matt Frewer; Drew Barrymore; Richard Masur; Susan Tyrrell
- Cinematography: Paul Elliott
- Edited by: Marc Grossman
- Music by: Jonathan Elias
- Production companies: Lightning Pictures; Planet Productions
- Distributed by: Vestron Pictures
- Release date: June 30, 1989
- Running time: 89 minutes
- Country: United States
- Language: English
- Box office: $11,859

Far from Home is a 1989 American thriller film. It stars Matt Frewer, Drew Barrymore, Richard Masur, and Susan Tyrrell. It centers on a divorced father and his teenage daughter who run out of fuel in a small desert town and are forced to stay there in a run down trailer park while they attempt to find fuel for their car where at the same time, a series of killings begin to take place as the daughter becomes the obsession of two troublesome boys.

The film was directed by Meiert Avis, in his feature film directorial debut. Barrymore's book, Little Girl Lost, which describes her battles with addiction, was written around the same time as this film was made. The film was shot in the Black Rock Desert and in Gerlach, Nevada.

== Plot ==
Charlie Cox is a divorced magazine writer based in Los Angeles. Charlie and his daughter Joleen are on their way home from a cross country vacation when they run out of gas in the small Nevada town of Banco, on the day before Joleen's 14th birthday, where their car is being taken care of by mechanic Duckett.

When they stop in a local supermarket, they find no one in the store except Sheriff Bill Childers. Joleen stumbles upon the body of the store's owner, Ferrell Hovis, in a pool of blood. Charlie and Joleen later discover that the nearby gas station is out of gas, forcing them to check into a trailer park owned by a surly woman named Agnes Reed. They meet Agnes's troubled teenage son Jimmy as well as their neighbors, fellow travelers Louise and Amy.

Meanwhile, as she swims in the trailer park's pool, Joleen hears two people loudly having sex in a nearby trailer. While watching through a window, she's startled by Jimmy watching through another window. That night, Agnes is killed when a hand reaches in through her bathroom window and pushes a small fan into the bathtub water, electrocuting her. Amy discovers Agnes's body, and Sheriff Childers responds to the murder. The next day, when Jimmy tries to rape Joleen, she is rescued by Pinky Sears, another local teenager.

Charlie and Joleen agree to carpool with Louise and Amy. Meanwhile Joleen's journal is stolen by the killer. As Charlie, Joleen, Louise, and Amy are about to leave the trailer park, Louise and Amy's car is blown up with Amy in it, to prevent Joleen from leaving. The next day, when Jimmy tries to take money from Agnes's office, he is accused not only of trying to rob the office, but also of the murders of Ferrell, Agnes, and Amy.

Duckett goes to Pinky's trailer, where he discovers that Pinky's mother has been dead for some time, and her body is covered with bags of ice. Pinky, who is revealed to be the killer, stabs Duckett with a screwdriver and leaves. An unwitting Joleen accompanies Pinky to an abandoned building and expresses attraction to him, to which he responds awkwardly. When Pinky then produces her diary, she realizes that he is the killer. Joleen tells him that he needs help, and she runs from him.

When Duckett radios Sheriff Childers to notify him that Pinky has Joleen, Childers and Charlie head to the hideaway. Pinky kills Childers by cutting his throat. After Joleen takes her diary back, Pinky chases her up to the top platform of a nearby radio tower. Charlie tries to get up on the platform, but Pinky stops Charlie by cutting his hand. Pinky says that he thought Joleen loved him. Duckett, who is sitting in a nearby vehicle with a rifle in his hands, fires a shot that causes Pinky to fall off of the tower. Pinky is killed when he lands in a large satellite dish far below.

Later Duckett explains that Pinky started slipping over the edge before he ever met Joleen. Pinky had been keeping ice on his mother's body and leaving her TV on because he really didn't want to believe she was gone. When Pinky went to the supermarket to get food on credit, and Ferrell denied him, he killed Ferrell. He killed Agnes when she demanded payment of overdue rent and blew up the car to stop Joleen from leaving. Charlie, Joleen, and Louise leave Banco, and they head home to California. Afterwards an angry Jimmy, who had escaped from Sheriff Childers's car, is seen walking along some railroad tracks, to parts unknown.

== Cast ==
- Matt Frewer as Charlie Cox
- Drew Barrymore as Joleen Cox
- Richard Masur as Duckett
- Susan Tyrrell as Agnes Reed
- Andras Jones as Jimmy Reed
- Stephanie Walski as Sissy Reed
- Anthony Rapp as Pinky Sears
- Jennifer Tilly as Amy
- Karen Austin as Louise
- Dick Miller as Sheriff Bill Childers
- Connie Sawyer as Viney Hunt
- Murrill Maglio as Man in Trailer
- Teri Weigel as Woman in Trailer
- John Spencer as TV Preacher
- Fred Culbertson as Police Officer

== Reception ==
Critical reception for Far from Home has been negative. DVD Verdict panned the film, as they felt that the film exploited Barrymore - who was fourteen at the time - as a sexual object and was also too predictably plotted. TV Guide also wrote a negative review, also criticizing it as too predictable and obvious.
