= A Family Thanksgiving =

2010 American TV film

- Written by: Emily Baer
- Directed by: Neill Fearnley
- Starring: Daphne Zuniga; Gina Holden; Faye Dunaway
- Music by: Peter Allen
- Country of origin: United States
- Original language: English

Production
- Producers: Michael G. Larkin; Michael R. Goldstein; Ian Hay
- Cinematography: Michael Balfry
- Editor: Stein Myhrstad

Original release
- Network: Hallmark Channel
- Release: November 6, 2010

A Family Thanksgiving is a 2010 Hallmark Channel Original Movie directed by Neill Fearnley.

== Plot ==
Claudia (Daphne Zuniga) is a successful trial attorney who graduated at the top of her class from Harvard Law School. She's working hard to become the first female partner at a high-powered law firm and believes her life is perfect. The day before their family is set to gather for Thanksgiving, Claudia's sister requests that she make a homemade apple pie for the event. Claudia, however, is everything but the homemaker her sister is, and is annoyed by the request because she doesn't have time for such things.

Meanwhile, Claudia is directed to assist a corporate client in reversing an injunction so that it can demolish a park to build an enormous development. In order to realize this, she insists her subordinate employees work on Thanksgiving Day, because the court hearing is the day after. During this process, Claudia meets Gina (Faye Dunaway), a mysterious older woman who makes it her goal to teach Claudia some moral lessons. Gina takes Claudia to an alternative world, where Claudia is a lower profile happily married minivan-driving 'soccer mom' with two children.

Claudia is perplexed by the situation she is now in, but while experiencing her new life, the way it could have been, she learns that she is missing out on a lot; despite past prejudice regarding married life, she eventually finds she's falling in love with the man to whom she is married, and she becomes accustomed to the new life she is leading. Furthermore, she grows closer to her sister. Just as she is about to settle with her new life, Gina returns to take her back. Claudia is reluctant to return to her corporate life, and thus must consider what she is most thankful for.

== Cast ==
- Daphne Zuniga as Claudia
- Faye Dunaway as Gina
- Gina Holden as Jen
- Dan Payne as Bill
- Kennedi Clements as Amy
- Catherine Lough Haggquist as Lindsay

== Production ==
In a press interview, Daphne Zuniga discussed the film: "I loved the idea when it came to me. But I worked with the writer (Emily Baer) to make sure the message wasn't that this woman should have had kids and regrets it. Instead, my character is a woman who is hugely successful, about to make partner in her law firm, has all the money she needs, a great wardrobe...and then she gets thrown into a life that shows her what it would be like if she'd made a different choice."

An October 2010 press release from Hallmark Channel revealed that the film was set to premiere on November 6.

== Reception ==
The entertainment magazine Variety felt the story provided a decent case for personal balance between having a career and a family. Added the critic: "...A perfect message for troubled economic times as well as the reflective aspect of the Thanksgiving season."

The Daily News expressed its disappointment in the film's "formulaic and uninspired" script, and furthermore criticized Zuniga and Dunaway for "hardly trying" to deliver a performance. The critic's discontent with the script was further explained: "Hallmark films are allowed some liberties with coincidence and unlikely events that service the plot, but this one exceeds its quota early. [..] A Family Thanksgiving leaves an uncharacteristically unpleasant aftertaste, because it ends up suggesting not just that Claudia is missing part of life, but that successful working women almost by definition must be misguided and miserable. That may not be the intent, but a lazy script can have inadvertent side effects."
