= Melrose Place (2009 TV series) =

American drama television series

- Also known as: Melrose Place 2.0
- Genre: Soap opera
- Based on: Melrose Place by Darren Star
- Developed by: Todd Slavkin and Darren Swimmer
- Starring: Katie Cassidy; Colin Egglesfield; Stephanie Jacobsen; Jessica Lucas; Michael Rady; Shaun Sipos; Ashlee Simpson
- Composer: Danny Lux
- Country of origin: United States
- Original language: English
- No. of seasons: 1
- No. of episodes: 18

Production
- Executive producers: Todd Slavkin; Darren Swimmer; Greg Beeman
- Production locations: Van Nuys, California
- Running time: 42 minutes
- Production companies: Slavkin/Swimmer; CBS Television Studios (pilot only); CBS Productions (episodes 2–18)

Original release
- Network: The CW
- Release: September 8, 2009 – April 13, 2010

Related
- Beverly Hills, 90210; Melrose Place; Models Inc.; 90210; BH90210

Melrose Place is an American drama television series that aired on The CW from September 8, 2009, to April 13, 2010. The series is a revival of the 1990s Fox series of the same name and is the fifth series in the Beverly Hills, 90210 franchise. The show follows the lives of a group of young adults living at the fictitious Melrose Place apartment complex in West Hollywood, California. Smallville producers Todd Slavkin and Darren Swimmer were showrunners of the series.

The series was met with mixed reviews from critics. Due to low ratings, it was cancelled by The CW on May 20, 2010, after one season.

== Development ==
After successfully relaunching the franchise with 90210 in 2008, there was considerable speculation as to whether The CW planned to revive Melrose Place in a similar vein. An article at E! Online reported the possibility of a new version of Melrose in September 2008, though The CW declined to confirm any such project at that time. Some weeks later, The CW and CBS Paramount Network Television (successor-in-interest of Spelling Television and therefore the legal rights holders to Melrose Place) said they were "exploring the possibility" of creating a new version of the series, to potentially debut in the 2009–2010 TV season and targeting their "prized demographic: young women." Original series creator Darren Star also confirmed that discussions had taken place, but nothing was official. On October 31, 2008, Entertainment Weekly writer Michael Ausiello reported that One Tree Hill creator Mark Schwahn had been approached about running what was being called "Melrose Place 2.0". The Hollywood Reporter confirmed on December 14, 2008, that Schwahn was in negotiations to write the initial script for the potential series.

In January 2009, The CW's head of entertainment, Dawn Ostroff, discussed the network's plans to develop a Melrose Place update, stating that she had yet to identify a writer, and that the proposed project would include both returning and new characters. She noted that the original Melrose Place series which began in 1992 started "at a time not unlike what we're going through now ... they talked about the building being foreclosed on, people not having jobs. It took place in a very similar time, a time when the economy was in a downturn." Ostroff also told reporters that unlike the original series, the new version would try to capture life in the Los Angeles Melrose neighborhood. When asked whether the new series would be the "earnest Melrose of season one or the nutty Kimberly-blowing-up-the-apartment-complex of later years," Ostroff explained, "In the beginning you've got to get invested in the characters, but I also think it can't be so dramatic and sleepy that not enough is going on. Our fans really love that heightened drama as you can see when you watch One Tree Hill and Gossip Girl. So the job is to get them emotionally invested in the people and then do storytelling and have twists and turns and surprises you wouldn't have expected."

On January 19, 2009, with Mark Schwahn now officially off the project, Ausiello reported that The CW were talking with Darren Swimmer and Todd Slavkin (showrunners of The CW's Smallville) about helming the new Melrose Place. On February 6, 2009, Ausiello confirmed that Swimmer and Slavkin were officially hired as the show runners of the spin-off, and discussed some of the new show's characters that were yet to be cast.

The Hollywood Reporter reported on February 23, 2009, that The CW had officially greenlit a pilot episode for the new Melrose Place written by Swimmer and Slavkin, which would "follow the original formula and chronicle a new group of twenty-somethings dwelling in Los Angeles' perpetually trendy Melrose neighborhood." Academy Award winner Davis Guggenheim (An Inconvenient Truth) was announced as the director and executive producer of the pilot.

The new series, ultimately just titled Melrose Place like its 1990s predecessor, premiered on The CW on September 8, 2009.

== Casting ==
Cast of Melrose Place (2009)

Ausiello's February 6, 2009, character preview introduced the series' seven new characters: David Patterson, son of the previous version's Jake Hanson "with the taut abs and thick black book to prove it;" his "omnisexual sometime lover" Ella Flynn, "a PR whiz whose tongue is as sharp as her stilettos;" Jonah Miller, an aspiring filmmaker; Riley Richmond, his "sickly-sweet schoolteacher fiancee;" Auggie Kirkpatrick, a "hunky hippie" and recovering alcoholic; "straight-arrow" med student Lauren Bishop, forced by hard times to "trade sexual favors for financial ones;" and Violet Foster, a small-town teen who is "fresh off the turnip truck" but knows how to "play the sex kitten" when necessary.

On February 25, 2009, The Hollywood Reporter reported that the first actor cast in the new series was Michael Rady, whose character Jonah was compared to Andrew Shue's Billy Campbell from the original Melrose Place. Variety announced on February 27, 2009, that Katie Cassidy had landed the role of Ella, whom Ausiello had previously compared to Heather Locklear's Amanda Woodward. On March 9, 2009, Ausiello reported that singer/actress Ashlee Simpson-Wentz had been cast as Violet, and quoted an unnamed inside source saying that talks with Locklear to reprise her role were "looking good." The Hollywood Reporter announced on March 17, 2009, that Jessica Lucas had won the role of Riley. The next day Entertainment Weekly broke the story that despite The CW "aggressively pursuing" her, Locklear had passed on the Melrose Place update, purportedly because "There wasn't a way to bring her back that made sense." On March 24, 2009, Colin Egglesfield was cast as Auggie, and Stephanie Jacobsen as Lauren. The Hollywood Reporter reported on April 3, 2009, that Shaun Sipos had landed the final regular role in the series – Jake's son David – now described as a rich kid whose "bad-boy behavior has cut him off from the family's money."

On April 5, 2009, The Hollywood Reporter broke the story that Laura Leighton would be joining the series as her original Melrose Place character Sydney Andrews. Though Sydney had seemingly been killed off in 1997 at the end of the original show's fifth season, the new pilot finds her alive and now the landlord of the titular apartment complex. TV Guide noted that Leighton would also continue in a recurring capacity should the updated Melrose Place be picked up. People reported on April 6, 2009, that Melrose Place original cast member Thomas Calabro would also reprise his series-long role as the duplicitous Dr. Michael Mancini, now established as the father of new character David (Sipos).

Ashlee Simpson-Wentz's portrayal of the scheming Violet Foster was criticized by both critics and fans who found her very loathsome, and she was reportedly disliked by fellow cast members. It was announced in October 2009 that Simpson-Wentz and Colin Egglesfield would be leaving the series after the conclusion of the "Sydney Andrews murder mystery" storyline.

== Production ==
Ausiello reported on May 19, 2009, that the series had been picked up by The CW. Presenting its 2009–2010 season schedule on May 21, 2009, The CW announced its intention to air Melrose Place after 90210 on Tuesday nights, in the same way their parent shows had been paired when the original Melrose Place debuted on Fox in July 1992. Ostroff added that there would likely be some character crossover between the two shows. Sipos's, Cassidy's, and Jacobsen's characters had also been renamed "David Breck," "Ella Simms," and "Lauren Yung" in the press release.

With the series in production, the Los Angeles Times noted on August 30, 2009, that the new Melrose Place intends to reflect life in Los Angeles beyond the way the original did by filming "everywhere from skid row to Sunset Boulevard and using popular venues, such as the Cinerama Dome and Walt Disney Concert Hall, as well as opulent mansions in Malibu and the so-called bird streets of the Hollywood Hills." Executive producers Slavkin and Swimmer both grew up in Los Angeles, and wanted to update the series "in a really cool, relevant way and not just slap the name Melrose Place on it." Concerned about repeating the same difficulties which occurred when incorporating original series characters in the 90210 update, The CW's Ostroff was drawn to Slavkin and Swimmer's intent to "create a new world but also hang on to what was special about Melrose originally ... I wanted to make sure that we used the old characters in the right way, in a way that made sense to the new characters as well." Swimmer added, "We felt the only way to incorporate the old characters into the new show was for it to feel like it was part of the story and came from the story."

On September 23, 2009, Variety reported that The CW had ordered an additional six scripts for the series, despite its ratings thus far being a "disappointment." On October 21, 2009, The CW officially ordered five more episodes of the series, bringing the total to eighteen. A day later in an interview with Ausiello, Slavkin and Swimmer announced that Egglesfield, Simpson-Wentz, and Leighton would leave the series once the murder mystery is resolved in episode 12. Egglesfield told E! Online that his departure was a network decision driven by the show's weak ratings, and that his character Auggie would not be killed off.

=== Guest stars ===
People reported on June 18, 2009, that Josie Bissett, who portrayed Michael's ex-wife and Sydney's older sister Jane Mancini in the original series, would guest star in at least one episode. Taylor Cole was next booked to guest star as David's ex-girlfriend, followed by Taryn Manning as a singer whose music video is directed by Jonah. The next day, Entertainment Weekly reported that original series star Daphne Zuniga would be returning as photographer Jo Reynolds for at least two episodes. On July 17, 2009, E! Online announced that Brooke Burns had been cast as Vanessa, wife of Dr. Michael Mancini and mother of his younger son Noah. That same day, TV Guide Magazine reported that Victor Webster had also been cast as Caleb, Ella's gay publicist boss. On July 20, 2009, E! Online reported that Kelly Carlson had been cast as a madam who convinces Lauren to work for her as part of her prostitution ring.

On August 19, 2009, E! Online announced that Jenna Dewan would appear on the series for at least two episodes as Kendra Wilson, a movie development executive who has her eyes on Jonah. Later that week, E! Online confirmed that Locklear was again in talks to join the update as her original series character Amanda. On August 31, 2009, former LA Laker Rick Fox announced he would be guest-starring on the series as an LA club owner. A rep for Melrose Place later confirmed the news to Access Hollywood, stating that Fox would appear in the eighth episode.

On September 22, 2009, The CW announced that Heather Locklear would finally join the update in its tenth episode. Show runners Slavkin and Swimmer were quoted as saying "We're ecstatic to have the chance to bring Amanda Woodward back to Melrose Place. Heather's involvement in the show is something we've been working on for some time, as we couldn't imagine creating and producing this show without the iconic character's inclusion." Ausiello revealed that Locklear would play Ella's boss at WPK, calling it "a genius move that will pit the show's former and current vixens against one another." On October 9, 2009, TV Guide reported that Billy Campbell had been cast as a powerful billionaire who would be involved with Amanda and first appear in episode thirteen. On October 27, 2009, Ausiello reported that Nick Zano was in talks to join as a pseudo-replacement for Colin Egglesfield's Auggie. Zano later confirmed his casting in an interview with the Entertainment Weekly columnist, revealed that he would play a doctor who works with Lauren and moves into the Melrose apartment complex, and that his role is recurring.

== Cancellation ==
Lagging ratings caused frequent speculation that the show would not be brought back for a second season. TV by the Numbers, a site that publishes television ratings to the public, repeatedly stated that the show had not hit its target audience and was likely to be cancelled. After the season finale, series producer Darren Swimmer left a statement on his Twitter account saying, "Melrose Place: Thnx for the love, fans. Honestly, a season 2 looks like it ain't gonna happen. All signs say no, but no official word yet." On May 18, 2010, two days before the new CW line-up was to be released, Swimmer left another message about the fate of the show: "I think it's fair to say we won't be renewed for next season. It was a great run. Mad props to everyone involved with the show & our fans!" The CW officially canceled the series on May 20, 2010.

In April 2024, another revival of the series was announced to be in development, which Deadline Hollywood speculated would continue the original series and ignore the 2009 revival.

== Plot ==
On May 21, 2009, Ausiello reported that Leighton's character Sydney dies in the pilot and sets off a murder mystery, but noted that the actress would continue to appear in multiple episodes of the season through flashbacks. The Los Angeles Times later confirmed that Sydney would be found dead in the first 10 minutes of the premiere episode, a turn of events which means "anything could happen" in the new series, according to executive producer Slavkin. "It will feel nostalgic, but it's not the old Melrose," Slavkin said. The Times added that initial episodes would revolve around the interrelationships of the apartment complex's seven residents and the theme that "no one is exactly who they seem," with Sydney's murder solved mid-season. As the series opens, new Melrose Place resident Violet finds Sydney floating dead in the courtyard pool. Student doctor Lauren reluctantly accepts cash for sex to pay her medical school tuition, as aspiring filmmaker Jonah is offered a directing deal in exchange for his silence about a famous director's indiscretion. David, Sydney's ex-lover and the police's initial suspect in her death, is bailed out of jail by bisexual publicist Ella, who provides a false alibi and has her own reasons for wanting Sydney out of the way. While David steals a valuable painting from his own father Michael Mancini in the dark of night, sous chef Auggie — seemingly the resident most upset by Sydney's death — burns a bloody chef's uniform.

Holding onto her job puts pressure on Ella, whose efforts to further secret crush Jonah's career do not help his relationship with his new fiancée Riley. Lauren is compelled to continue prostituting herself, and while Sydney's sister Jane's attempt to blackmail Ella fails, she follows through on her promise to clue in the police on Ella's motives for Sydney's murder. Violet is revealed to be Sydney's secret daughter, and schemes to both get close to Auggie, and punish Michael for mistreating Sydney.

== Cast and characters ==
=== Main ===
- Katie Cassidy as Ella Simms, a publicist who began her career under the guidance of Sydney Andrews, the new landlady of 4616 Melrose Place. Ella's close friendships with some of the other tenants, David and Jonah, are highlighted with some sexuality. Ambitious, scheming, and at times devious, Ella eventually comes into her own as a confident woman in show business. This is shown by her willingness to use her sexuality to get things done by seducing both men and women. Prior to Sydney's untimely death, Ella's relationship with her mentor had soured. She had a brief relationship with Jonah, after his broken engagement to Riley.
- Colin Egglesfield as August "Auggie" Kirkpatrick, a chef and part-time surfer with a history of alcoholism, which has adversely affected his life to the point that it once got him in a fight which killed his girlfriend. This landed him in an Alcoholics Anonymous meeting with Sydney, with whom he had a brief relationship. With Sydney's help, he is able to overcome this. He later tries to help Sydney when she also becomes addicted to drugs. After Sydney's death, Auggie turns to Riley for comfort. When this does not work out, he begins a relationship with Violet (originally unaware that she is Sydney's long-lost daughter) and eventually leaves California with her.
- Stephanie Jacobsen as Lauren Yung, Ella's roommate and a cash-strapped medical student of Dr. Mancini. With the obsession to be a medical doctor at any cost, she reluctantly turns to prostitution in order to pay her tuition. Lauren's first client was a man who offered her a huge sum of money to have sex with him. He later becomes her "pimp", recommending her to one of his friends. After she rendered her services to a man she met at a certain hotel bar, she is confronted by Wendi, a madam who has made a deal with the hotel, who threatens her if she ever sees her there again. Lauren is eventually employed by Wendi, and her new job has become invasive of her personal life, to the point that her friends see less and less of her. When Michael Mancini threatens to reveal her secret to the hospital, she comes clean to her friends about her profession which she quits soon after and enters into a romance with David.
- Jessica Lucas as Riley Richmond, an elementary schoolteacher who is engaged to Jonah. In addition to her being wary of Jonah's friendship with Ella, she also has some feelings for her jogging partner, Auggie.
- Michael Rady as Jonah Miller, a good-natured friend of Ella's who works in the IT department of her agency and is also an aspiring filmmaker. His close friendship with Ella is only one of the problems in his relationship with his fiancée, Riley.
- Shaun Sipos as David Breck, another friend of Ella's and Michael Mancini's son with an unnamed woman. He had a brief relationship with his landlady, Sydney, prior to her untimely death. He is also, possibly, the biological father of Noah, the son of his father's recently deceased wife, Vanessa. David later has an intimate relationship with Ella's roommate, Lauren. Although they eventually ended breaking up, they both remain with strong feelings for each other. Often unemployed, David supports himself by performing robberies of houses in wealthy neighborhoods and selling the items he steals on the black market thanks to his criminal contact Amir. He later uses his ill-gotten money to buy the restaurant Coal as a means of going legal and legitimate.
- Ashlee Simpson-Wentz as Violet Foster, a young woman new to California and struggling to fit in with the other tenants of Melrose Place. While she quickly becomes friends with some of them, none of them know that she came to California to find her biological mother. It turned out that her biological mother is Sydney, who rejected her at first but later wanted to get to know her. Violet's reunion with her mother is cut short when Sydney is found murdered in the pool. She later finds out about her mother's turbulent relationship with Dr. Michael Mancini, whom she approaches to apply as the nanny of his son, Noah. Being just as scheming and manipulative as her biological mother, Violet eventually has an affair with Michael and even blackmails him with a recording of their one night stand. She reveals to him that she is Sydney's daughter and that she wants to get back at him for treating her mother badly. In searching for her mother's murderer, Violet finds out that Michael's wife, Vanessa, had previously confronted Sydney about her affair with Michael. Sydney's insinuation that Vanessa's son with Michael, Noah, was actually fathered by Michael's estranged son, David (who also had a brief relationship with Sydney), drove Vanessa to kill her. Violet then confronts Vanessa, resulting in a fight in the pool, and ultimately, Vanessa's death. Her drug-addicted adoptive brother came to California, and it was revealed they'd been secretly sleeping together unbeknownst to their parents. She then dated Auggie Kirkpatrick, eventually leaving California with him.

=== Special guest stars ===
- Laura Leighton as Sydney Andrews
- Thomas Calabro as Dr. Michael Mancini
- Josie Bissett as Jane Andrews
- Daphne Zuniga as Jo Reynolds
- Heather Locklear as Amanda Woodward

=== Recurring characters and guest stars ===
- Nicholas Gonzalez as Detective James Rodriguez
- Victor Webster as Caleb Brewer, Ella's boss at WPK
- Jason Olive as Detective Drake
- Brooke Burns as Vanessa Mancini, Michael's newest wife
- Ethan Erickson as Chef Marcello, Augie's boss at Coal
- Kelly Carlson as Wendi Mattison, Lauren's madame employer
- Nick Zano as Drew Pragin, an intern at Wilshire Hospital and Riley's newest love interest
- Adam Kaufman as Toby Shepard
- Niall Matter as Rick Paxton
- Cameron Castaneda as Noah Mancini, Michael and Vanessa's five-year-old son
- Billy Campbell as Ben Brinkley, Amanda's billionaire boyfriend
- Wendy Glenn as Melissa Saks, Ella's flirt

== Episodes ==
No.	Title	Directed by	Written by	Original release date	U.S. viewers (millions)
1	"Pilot"	Davis Guggenheim	Todd Slavkin & Darren Swimmer	September 8, 2009	2.27
When a bloody body is found floating in the courtyard pool at 4616 Melrose Place, suspicion falls on handsome and rebellious David Breck. However, as the police soon discover, almost everyone living there had a reason to want the deceased out of the way.
2	"Nightingale"	Greg Beeman	Liz Tigelaar	September 15, 2009	1.81
Still freaked out by the recent murder, the Melrose Place tenants try to resume some sense of a normal life. Ella learns from her new boss, Caleb, that her job could be in jeopardy due to a recent merger unless she brings in a huge client. Ella then forces David to take her to a Brentwood party, where she hopes to land a big actor client, Jasper. Still in desperate need of tuition money, Lauren agrees to go out on another date in exchange for money, but inadvertently winds up at the same party as David and Ella. Detective Rodriguez questions Auggie, who flashes back to when he first met Sydney in AA. Riley and Jonah view surveillance video of Violet acting oddly and begin to think she is hiding something.
3	"Grand"	Allan Arkush	Caroline Dries	September 22, 2009	1.50
Jonah is furious when he learns that Riley has not told her family or friends that she and Jonah are engaged. Upset over their fight, Riley turns to Auggie for comfort. Caleb reams Ella after her director bails on a job, so she recruits Jonah to fill in on a Boomkat music video at the last minute. However, the lead singer, Taryn, might be more than Jonah can handle, putting Ella's job on the line. Meanwhile, David accuses Michael of murdering Sydney, as Lauren applies to be on Michael's team at the hospital, and Violet continues to make her move on Auggie.
4	"Vine"	Fred Toye	Daniel Thomsen Dries	September 29, 2009	1.47
Jane Andrews, Sydney's sister, comes to Melrose Place and announces that she inherited the building from Sydney. Jane threatens to show incriminating e-mails Ella sent to Sydney to the police unless Ella allows her to dress one of her up-and-coming clients for a movie premiere in a Jane Andrews original design. Desperate, Ella turns to David for help. Detective Rodriguez shows up at Violet's apartment asking questions about her connection to Sydney, but she flees though the window. Lauren meets a john at the hotel bar after being stood up by Toby and decides to take her new side job to the next level. However, upon leaving the hotel, Lauren is stopped by Wendi, a madam who has a deal with the hotel, who threatens Lauren if she ever sees her in there again.
5	"Canon"	Norman Buckley	Chris Fife	October 6, 2009	1.60
As a result of Jane's tip, the police bring Ella in for questioning about Sydney's murder. Ella naturally downplays the tension between her and Sydney in the days prior to the murder. Meanwhile, Lauren is torn between going on a shopping date with Riley for her wedding and impressing her new boss Wendi who just set her up on a "date." A stunned Jonah is accused of stealing a diamond necklace from a mansion he videotaped for a realtor, but becomes even more upset after Ella mentions a similar necklace that she saw in David's apartment. Elsewhere, Violet maliciously sabotages another employee at Coal so she can get closer to Auggie.
6	"Shoreline"	Roxann Dawson	Alex McNally	October 13, 2009	1.40
Anton V, a famous fashion designer, meets Riley and decides she must be the face of his new denim jean campaign, much to his publicist Ella's horror. Jonah is excited about the offer to direct another music video as he's run into financial issues but Riley turns down the gig. Meanwhile, Wendi sends Lauren on a job on a yacht, but Lauren panics when she sees David board the boat to meet with his boss' friend to ask for more robbery jobs. Also, Violet feigns illness to orchestrate a meeting with Michael at the hospital as part of her plan to exact revenge for the way he treated Sydney.
7	"Windsor"	Patrick Norris	Jonathan Caren	October 20, 2009	1.49
Ella and Riley arrive at the Anton V photo shoot and meet the photographer, former Melrose Place resident Jo Reynolds. Jo feels that Riley's inexperience is preventing Jo from getting her shot, so Jo pushes Riley's buttons and insists on a topless shoot to help Riley get in touch with her emotions. Meanwhile, Jonah meets with a producer's development exec, Kendra, who invites him to have drinks later that night to discuss his film. Violet makes another play for Auggie's attention, and Lauren finds out about David's criminal secret of robbing people's houses for expensive artwork.
8	"Gower"	David Barrett	Caprice Crane	November 3, 2009	1.48
Riley helps Jonah film a wedding, but the two get into a big fight in the middle of the ceremony. Putting her relationship with Jonah first, Riley breaks off her friendship with Auggie, who doesn't take the news very well. Auggie later finally takes out his repressed anger by punching his demanding boss at Coal Restaurant. Meanwhile, Ella discovers Lauren's expensive new clothing and lingerie plus a large envelope of cash and confronts her roommate about the late nights she's been working. As is her wont, Lauren lies to Ella about her secret work. Also, David fears he may be responsible for Sydney's death.
9	"Ocean"	Liz Friedlander	David Babcock	November 10, 2009	1.27
After learning Auggie's blood was on Sydney's murder weapon, the police search his apartment and demand the other residents tell them where he went after he was fired from Coal. Riley is conflicted about whether to help the police, but Jonah pushes her to make the call as she knows where Auggie is staying. Meanwhile, a work incident causes Jonah to pretend he's engaged to Ella who really gets into the role playing. David arranges a secret play date with his little half-brother, Noah, but after the little boy hurts himself, Lauren must come to the rescue and risk the wrath of Dr. Michael Mancini.
10	"Cahuenga"	Michael Fields	Caroline Dries	November 17, 2009	1.56
Ruthless Amanda Woodward, owner of the WPK Agency, fires half the staff and torments the survivors. Auggie desperately tries to clear himself of the murder charge. David asks Lauren out on a date, but she turns him down, fearing that he may find out her secret profession. David learns about Auggie's arrest and thinks someone tried to frame him for Sydney's murder.
11	"June"	David Paymer	Dan Thomsen	December 1, 2009	1.40
Amanda moves into Sydney's penthouse while her Bel Air mansion is being built and takes an interest in David as part of her continuing agenda. Meanwhile, David and Lauren's relationship continues to grow despite her determination to hide her secret call-girl profession from him. Ella uses her charms to get Jonah a new job as the computer I.T. guy at WPK where she asks him to spy on Amanda's e-mails in an attempt to get the best on her. Amanda and Michael have an awkward reunion. Also, Violet receives an unwelcome visitor from her past: her evil stepbrother Levi, who wants to bring her back to her hometown in Oregon, and Riley inadvertently gets in harm's way when Levi attempts to extort money from Violet.
12	"San Vicente"	Bethany Rooney	Story by : Todd Slavkin & Darren Swimmer; Teleplay by : Chris Fife	December 8, 2009	1.25
When the pressure of planning their wedding becomes too much, Jonah and Riley decide to head to Las Vegas to elope, but the day doesn't quite go as planned. Ella arranges a pitch meeting for Jonah with an important producer who is interested in buying his film. Meanwhile, Lauren calls David after she gets in trouble with one of her male clients and Auggie confesses his true feelings for Riley. Also, an incarcerated Michael gives David information about Sydney's killer and Amanda bonds with Violet over Sydney, but of course Amanda has an ulterior motive in getting to know Violet. The identity of Sydney's killer is finally revealed.
13	"Oriole"	Greg Beeman	Alex McNally	March 9, 2010	1.19
Amanda puts Ella in charge of a lavish party at her house to celebrate the arrival of her billionaire boyfriend Ben Brinkley (guest star Billy Campbell). However, after Amanda spies Ella and Ben together in a compromising position, she naturally lashes out. Meanwhile, Riley asks Jonah if they can start over when they attend Amanda's party. Violet asks Auggie to leave town with her to start over when she finds him drinking again. Elsewhere, Lauren struggles to recover from her near-fatal roofie overdose while David, under false pretenses, confronts the john who drugged Lauren.
14	"Stoner Canyon"	Seith Mann	Story by : Caprice Crane; Teleplay by : Caroline Dries	March 16, 2010	1.16
The sexy and catty Drew Pragin moves into Auggie's old apartment and immediately clashes with Lauren over his love of loud rock music. She becomes even more upset when he shows up at the hospital as the newest resident and is just as ambitious and crafty as she. Meanwhile, Riley asks Ben to help her land another elementary school teaching job, which infuriates the jealous Amanda. David receives life-changing news from an unexpected source, while Michael wallows in self-pity over learning about his late wife's involvement with Sydney's murder. Also, Ella makes an unrealistic demand of Jonah that backfires by continuing to pretend that he and Riley are still together to an actor interested in playing Jonah's part in his upcoming biographical movie. Elsewhere, Lauren covers for Michael's mistake at the hospital, and he responds by paying off her student loan. But when Lauren decides to quit her call-girl profession after one last job, she finds her latest client is Michael Mancini.
15	"Mulholland"	J. Miller Tobin	David Babcock	March 23, 2010	0.96
Ella is a little overwhelmed by Jonah's constant attention and during an unusual social gathering he brings her to, she decides couple-hood might not be for her. Meanwhile, Lauren succumbs to the merciless Dr. Mancini's threats to break up with David. David decides to buy the restaurant Coal, but the price turns out to be a little higher than he thought. So, David asks his boss and fence Amir to set him up for another robbery job to get the money needed, except that David gets caught by Morgan, the wild-child bad girl of the home's owner whom demands sexual favors in exchange for her silence. Also, Drew begins to moonlight in a rock band, and Amanda catches Ben and Riley in a compromising position as she continues searching for the stolen painting.
16	"Santa Fe"	Greg Beeman	Dan Thomsen & Alex McNally	March 30, 2010	1.12
Ella discovers someone is embezzling from WPK and framing her for it. Panicked that she could go to jail, Ella investigates and starts with Jo Reynolds, who realizes Amanda is up to her old tricks again. Meanwhile, Jonah decides to throw a party in the courtyard to celebrate his new-found success. Jane shows up to confront Amanda for not firing Ella and runs into Michael. Lauren is shocked after Michael tells her he'll reveal her secret if she doesn't sleep with him, so she makes a harsh decision: Lauren reveals her secret to her friends and David is angry. Elsewhere, Riley and Drew share a sweet date during an outing to East L.A.
17	"Sepulveda"	Norman Buckley	Caroline Dries	April 6, 2010	1.05
David's new role as a restaurant owner is put to the test after he loses some of his staff on the day an important food critic has come to review Coal. In an effort to get David to forgive her for lying to him about her secret call-girl profession, Lauren pitches in as a waitress and hostess and helps him out of his jam. Meanwhile, Ella wants to hack into the WPK files to erase the fake evidence against her for embezzlement, but Jonah strongly disagrees with her tactics, so she looks to David for help. With Drew's help, Riley throws a fundraiser for her education foundation, but when Drew tries to increase the donations by auctioning off a date with Riley, things go awry after Drew and a jealous Jonah get into a bidding war.
18	"Wilshire"	Greg Beeman	Darren Swimmer & Todd Slavkin	April 13, 2010	1.09
Ella finds the stolen painting Amanda has been looking for and blackmails her for it. Michael sets Drew up to get caught with drugs until Lauren comes to Drew's rescue. Lauren and David reconcile. Jonah asks Riley to reconcile, but she declines. Amanda is arrested by two FBI agents and Ella replaces her as head of WPK.

== Reception ==
=== U.S. Nielsen ratings ===
Viewership and ratings per season of 7th Heaven
Season	Timeslot (ET)	Episodes	First aired		Last aired		TV season	Viewership rank	Avg. viewers (millions)	Avg. 18–49 rating
Season	Timeslot (ET)	Episodes	Date	Viewers (millions)	Date	Viewers (millions)	TV season	Viewership rank	Avg. viewers (millions)	Avg. 18–49 rating
1	Tuesday 9 p.m.	18	September 8, 2009	2.27	April 13, 2010	1.09	2009–10	138	1.39	0.7

=== Critical ===
Entertainment Weekly's Ken Tucker gave the pilot a B, stating that "it remains to be seen whether the new Melrose will become as giddily addictive as its predecessor — but it's off to a promisingly dizzy start." The Los Angeles Times compared the update to the original, noting that "Camp has given way to noir, soap has morphed into mystery, and acting and dialogue have become more sophisticated while alcoholism, drug addiction, infidelity and even murder remain among the permanent residents of the fictitious 4616 Melrose Place." The Hollywood Reporter stated, "It's all brand new and shiny but comfortably familiar and keenly calculated. The pleasures abound within the walls of the new 'MP,' but be warned: You'll want to take a shower afterward." Melrose Place was the No. 1 trending topic on Twitter for about an hour on its debut night, and its ratings put it in second place among its core young adult audience in the 9 pm hour.

Metacritic gave the episode a Metascore of 57, signifying mixed reviews, a weighted average based on a select 23 critical reviews.

== International syndication ==
Melrose Place began airing in 26 countries in Latin America on November 10, 2009, via Sony Entertainment Television. Episodes were aired in English, and are subtitled in French, Portuguese and Spanish.
