= Ladyfire =

US girl group

Ladyfire was a band assembled by producer Dick Bauerle featuring female vocalists Laurie Moran, Jean Deegan, and Winnie Bergner. Their song, "I Just Wanna Be Loved by You" was recorded in Michael Lloyd's studio in Los Angeles and featured in the film, Spaceballs. The trio also performed the song on The Late Show starring Joan Rivers, who had a major role in the film.
