= Penalty Phase =

1986 television film directed by Tony Richardson

- Genre: Drama; Thriller
- Written by: Gale Patrick Hickman
- Directed by: Tony Richardson
- Starring: Peter Strauss; Jonelle Allen; Karen Austin; Jane Badler; John Harkins; Millie Perkins; Mitchell Ryan; Melissa Gilbert
- Music by: Ralph Burns
- Country of origin: United States
- Original language: English

Production
- Producer: Tamara Asseyev
- Production locations: Portland, Oregon; The Dalles, Oregon
- Cinematography: Steve Yaconelli
- Editor: David A. Simmons
- Running time: 96 minutes
- Production company: New World Television

Original release
- Network: CBS
- Release: November 18, 1986

Penalty Phase is a 1986 American made-for-television thriller drama film directed by Tony Richardson and starring Peter Strauss.

== Plot ==
Supreme court judge, Kenneth Hoffman (Peter Strauss) oversees a high-profile murder trial which appears to be an open-and-shut case. The murderer has confessed and Prosecutor Susan Jansen (Jonelle Allen) is direct and hard hitting, and the jury has delivered a guilty verdict. However, Judge Hoffman discovers that the evidence was not legally obtained, and for him to reject it and the trial outcome may have consequences for his career.

== Cast ==
- Peter Strauss as Judge Kenneth Hoffman
- Jonelle Allen as Susan Jansen
- Karen Austin as Julie
- Melissa Gilbert as Leah Furman
- Mitchell Ryan as Judge Donald Faulkner
- Jane Badler as Katie Pinter
- John Harkins as Mr. Hunter
- Millie Perkins as Nancy Faulkner
- Richard Bright as Judge Von Karman
- Richard Chaves as Nolan Esherman
- Rossie Harris as Zach Hoffman
- Art LaFleur as Pete Pavlovich
