= Mail Order Bride (2008 film) =

2008 TV film

- Film poster
- Written by: Tippi Dobrofsky; Neal H. Dobrofsky
- Directed by: Anne Wheeler
- Starring: Daphne Zuniga; Cameron Bancroft
- Music by: Michael Richard Plowman
- Country of origin: United States
- Original language: English

Production
- Producer: Randy Cheveldave
- Cinematography: David Pelletier
- Editor: Jana Fritsch
- Running time: 120 minutes
- Production company: Larry Levinson Productions

Original release
- Network: Hallmark Channel
- Release: November 8, 2008

Mail Order Bride is a 2008 American Western television film on the Hallmark Channel. It premiered on November 8, 2008, and stars Daphne Zuniga.

== Plot ==
Con-woman Diana McQueen decides to skip out of town and leave her boss, Tom Rourke, behind. To avoid the conflict that would result by her quick disappearance, she switches places with a dying friend, who had planned on becoming a man's mail-order bride. Seeing that this is her only chance to escape, she takes on the role and lies to the unsuspecting frontiersman.

== Cast ==
- Daphne Zuniga as Diana McQueen
- Greg Evigan as Tom Rourke
- Cameron Bancroft as Beau Canfield
- Tom Heaton as Willy
- Katharine Isabelle as Jen
- William MacDonald as Sheriff
- Michael Teigen as Joe
- Brendan Beiser as Auctioneer
- Ted Whittall as Aaron Carlyle
- Andy Rukes as Franco (as Angelo Renai)
- Philip Granger as Association Rancher
- Karin Konoval as Mrs. Vaughn
- Robert Mann as Stagecoach Clerk
- Patrick Gilmore as Homesteader
- Marcos Amaya Torres as anjo Player (as Marcos Amaya-Torres)
- Oliver Schenelder as Accordion Player

== Reception ==
Mail Order Bride ranked as the network's most-watched November non-holiday original movie ever. The movie scored a 2.2 household rating, delivered nearly 1.9 million homes, 2.5 million total viewers and 3.9 million unduplicated viewers. It also ranked as the second-highest-rated cable movie of the day and fourth-highest-rated movie of the week. This performance boosted Hallmark Channel to rank #2 in Prime Time for the day, and #10 for the week.
