= Jo Reynolds =

- Melrose Place character
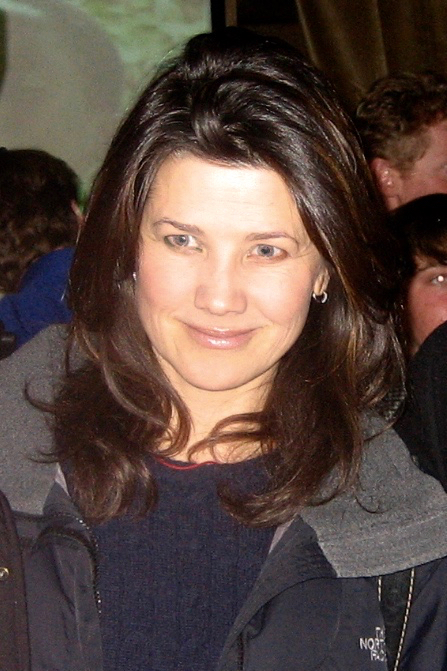
- Daphne Zuniga (pictured in 2007) portrayed Jo Reynolds
- Portrayed by: Daphne Zuniga
- Duration: 1992–96; 2009–10
- First appearance: Melrose Place: November 11, 1992 (episode 1.15: "House of God")
- Last appearance: Melrose Place (2009): March 30, 2010 (episode 1.16: "Santa Fe")
- Created by: Darren Star
In-universe information
- Occupation: Photographer
- Mother: Miranda Foster
- Half-sisters: Casey Underwood
- Spouse: Charles Reynolds (ex-husband)
- Sons: Austin Reynolds Carter
- Grandmothers: Joan Foster

Jo Reynolds is a fictional character in the American television series Melrose Place, the second series in the Beverly Hills, 90210 franchise. Portrayed by Daphne Zuniga, Jo Reynolds appeared in the first four seasons of Melrose Place. She also appeared in the pilot of "Models Inc." (Melrose Place first spin-off) and later appeared in two episodes in the 2009 series revival.

== Storylines ==
=== Arrival at Melrose Place and relationship with Jake (1992-1993) ===
Jo arrived at the Melrose Place apartment complex from New York City to escape from her stormy marriage to Charles Reynolds. Afraid of exposure, she is initially unfriendly to her neighbors and hesitant to allow anyone into her personal life. As the story progresses, Jo meets her match in gruff "bad boy" Jake Hanson, and the two begin a tempestuous romance. Alike in their passion and stubbornness, they fight and reunite repeatedly. Jo is threatened when the complex is bought by the aggressive Amanda Woodward, who has an obvious attraction to Jake. After a further series of fights and miscommunication, Jo loses Jake to the conniving Amanda.

=== Reed Carter, arrest for murder, pregnancy and custody battle (1993–1995) ===
A new love entered her life when Jo attended a high school reunion and bumped into an old high school acquaintance named Reed Carter. Soon, Jake was a distant memory as she began a seemingly great love affair with Reed. However, she discovered that Reed was secretly dealing drugs. When he found out that Jo was aware of his illegal activities, Reed kidnapped and tortured her, holding her captive in a boat he used to share business with Jake and Amanda. Reed brutally raped and ultimately tried to kill Jo, but she killed him to escape his abuse. Jo was immediately tried for the death of Reed and almost lost it all in court. After settling down with being proven not guilty, new troubles plagued Jo. She found out a few months later that she was pregnant by Reed and wanted to get an abortion. With help from Jake, who was beginning to realize the feelings he still had for her, she got through the pregnancy.

A couple of months before Jo was due to deliver, Reed's parents arrived at Melrose Place. The Carters wanted revenge on her for "killing their son" although they knew Jo shot Reed because of his abusive nature. Nothing Jo did would satisfy them. She tried to tell them that she would settle out of court, but the Carters sued her for custody of their grandson. The Carters' attorney convinced the court that Jo was not a fit mother. In a shocking turn of events, Jo lost the custody of her child to the Carters before it was even born. She also ended her friendship with Alison, who was supposed to testify on her behalf but showed up high on stimulants in the courtroom the day she was to testify.

Jo slowly began to die inside, going through depression and not feeling the work of her beloved photography job any longer, when Kimberly Shaw showed up. Shaw showed that a ray of hope still survived: She was going to help Jo fake her own child's death, so that Jo could go into hiding back in New York City and raise her child there, and the Carters would never know. They even set it up with switched hospital records that would declare Jo's baby dead. Through the months preceding the due date, Kimberly and Jo were able to trick the Carters into believing their grandchild was dead.

When the baby boy, whom Jo named Austin, was born, Kimberly suffered one of her imbecilic head colds, and decided to steal Jo's baby and keep it for herself. For weeks, Jo struggled to prove that her son was in danger, but still alive, despite what the birth records stated. Once a blood test was performed by Michael Mancini, Jo was revealed to be the baby's mother. After extreme pressure from Dr. Peter Burns, then Chief of Staff of Wilshire Memorial Hospital, Michael conceded and set Kimberly to work on Christmas Day, and while she was gone, he gave baby Austin back to mother Jo, the perfect Christmas present.

Not long after, things again became ugly for Jo. Kimberly called upon the Carters, telling them that their grandson was very much alive and that she knew where he was. Jo, on the other hand, was happy and made Jake the godfather of Austin, when an unexpected nanny came to 4616 Melrose Place. When all seemed to be in good condition, this nanny was terrific and took excellent care of Austin - until she stole him and it turned out she was working for the Carters to get Austin back all along. Jake helped Jo search for her son, although all hope seemed lost. The two were finally able to track the Carters down at their lake house, and Jake swore to Jo that he would get Austin back for her. The two refound the love they once had, albeit briefly. After tracking the Carters down, Jo panicked upon seeing her child in their arms, and tried to take the plunge to get her son back, but in another turn of terrifying events, she was shot by the Carters when trying to flee into Jake's arms. Taken to the hospital, Jo recuperated for a few days, when Mrs. Carter threatened Jo in the middle of the night, telling her to stay away from them. But Jo was not going down without a fight. She took the Carters back to court, and declared that if she couldn't raise her child, she wanted him to be raised by a family who could.

The Carters eventually lost Austin, and were never going to see him again. Jo, on the other hand, would be able to see Austin again when he was eighteen. In an emotional and heartwarming moment, Jo was allowed one final moment with her son, to say goodbye. From there, Jo settled down, and took it easy, sticking with her work, and staying away from relationships. She and Jake seemed to be getting along well, and she trusted him after all he had done for her.

Later, Jo, along with Jake and Jane Mancini, fell victim to vandalism. Rikki, who moved into 4616 Melrose with Sydney, trashed her motorcycle and committed other acts to her apartment, including stealing her cameras. However, this did not stop her career.

While downtown in the rough side of town to take pictures for a huge story on night life there, she witnessed a violent act of police brutality, which led to a plethora of questions from the police concerning which one of their team committed the act. Jo cooperated, only to meet stern "justice" when the officer who committed the act of violence ripped her apartment to shreds, and would not leave her alone about keeping her mouth shut. So she went to Matt Fielding, close friend and fellow Melrose Place resident. He turned the pictures in, causing much dismay from the cop who was the murderer. This led to the cop holding Jo and Matt at gunpoint, another victimized situation, but Jo was strong again, and got the gun from the cop and stated "What you didn't know, is that I am tired of being the victim!"

=== Reunited with Jake (1995) ===
Because of all that Jake had done for her, she decided it was her turn to do something for him, by accompanying him to the funeral of his mother (who was shown in season one). There, she helped Jake deal with the trauma of the incident and took note of the stormy relationship between him and his brother Jess. She and Jake slept together again but only once. After driving home with Jake, Jo laid low for a few weeks.

But things heated up again when Jess Hanson moved to Los Angeles with a sinister agenda. Jo felt his pain when Jake shut him out of his apartment at Melrose Place, so she lent him her couch and became attracted to him. Their attraction was a lightning bolt of a relationship, having sex in the alley ways behind bars, sex on bookshelves, and all the while, she was afraid to tell Jake, because it would damage their relationship.

Jake eventually did find out, and wanting to protect Jo, he and his brother had a feud that ended when his brother hired men to kill him. Jo knew nothing of this. She continued her affair with Jess but kept a close watch on Jake. Jess became irrational and never let her spend time with her friends, causing her to stress the relationship. Finally, when Jess intended to propose to her, she told him that they may have needed to take some time to really think about their relationship. Jess wasn't as impressed, and in a fit of rage, assaulted Jo before fleeing the scene. When Jake discovered the truth, he knew that Jess wanted to steal Jo away from him the whole time. The two got in a fight that ended with Jess falling to his death.

Jo was in shock after all this. Aside from the beating and Melrose Place being blown to bits by Kimberly Shaw, the unstable doctor who kidnapped her child, she was alone and afraid. She and Jake made amends and became involved again. She and Jake were going very well, but her friendship with Jane was not. Jo knew that Jane was only marrying Richard Hart, a very successful designer, for money. Jo told Richard everything, tarnishing Jane's relationship with Richard and Jo's relationship with Jane.

Soon after, Jake developed feelings for his new waitress, Shelley, who was Jess’ ex. After finding Jake making out on a pool table with Shelley, Jo called it quits with Jake for good and ran into the arms of Richard, who willingly accepted her. For most of season four, Jo was playing second fiddle to Richard, assisting him at his company, "Mackenzie Hart Designs". Many times, she was caught in the middle of public feuds between Jane and Richard. Jake would fall into them as well, but this did not bring them back together.

=== Departure (1996) ===
Jo later dumped Richard and then put her life on hold, trying to figure out what to do next. Jake offered comfort, but not his love. She could tell he wanted to, but the two had been through too much, and their love, could not save them this time. As she was living on "automatic pilot" for a few weeks, a friend of Sydney's, Laurie, came by 4616 Melrose Place, with her son Tyler, to stay. Sydney was not very interested in this friend anymore, and Jo, being the wonderful and kind hearted person she was, let them stay with her. When the little boy showed bruises, Jo was concerned and made sure Matt Fielding, did something about it, by going to his mentor, Dr. Dominick O'Malley. O'Malley helped the boy out and all was well with her relationship. O'Malley became, in these few days, attracted to the headstrong Jo, so much so that he had Matt set her up with him.

Initially, Jo did not care for Dominick. When Matt's health was in jeopardy, Dominick came through, and Jo realized that he was a great man. They enjoyed a happy relationship and he later proposed to Jo. At first, she was taken aback, believing that she had been through too many bad relationships to go on with them seriously. He told her she had not, and that if they didn't get together, then he would never be able to see her again, because he was going to Bosnia to help the orphans. Jo had never been more torn in her life, and for the first time, she knew what true love was, and that she truly loved Dominick as much as he equally loved her. Jo eventually agreed to leave L.A. with him.
