= The Initiation (film) =

- Theatrical release poster
- Directed by: Larry Stewart (Note: Though Stewart is the only credited director on the film, Peter Crane was the original director who was fired from the project several days into shooting. Some of Crane's work still appears in the final cut of the film, though he is uncredited.)
- Written by: Charles Pratt Jr.
- Produced by: Scott Winant
- Starring: Vera Miles; Clu Gulager; James Read; Daphne Zuniga
- Cinematography: George Tirl
- Edited by: Ronald LaVine
- Music by: Gabriel Black; Lance Ong
- Production companies: Georgian Bay Productions; Initiation Associates
- Distributed by: New World Pictures
- Release date: April 6, 1984
- Running time: 93 minutes
- Country: United States
- Language: English
- Budget: $3 million

The Initiation is a 1984 American slasher film directed by Larry Stewart, and starring Daphne Zuniga, Vera Miles, Clu Gulager, and James Read. The plot focuses on a young woman plagued by a disturbing recurring nightmare, who finds herself and her fellow sorority pledges stalked by a killer during their initiation ritual in a department store after-hours.

Filmed in Dallas, Texas in 1983, The Initiation initially had English director Peter Crane attached, though he was fired from the project early into the shoot, after which television director Stewart took over. The Dallas Market Center and Southern Methodist University served as the primary shooting locations.

The Initiation was given a regional staggered release by New World Pictures beginning in the spring of 1984, and continued to screen theatrically through December of that year. It was met by largely unfavorable reviews by film critics. In the years since its release, the film has been noted for marking star Zuniga's first leading role after her minor part in The Dorm That Dripped Blood (1982), as well as establishing a contemporary cult following as a midnight movie.

== Plot ==
Since childhood, college student Kelly Fairchild has suffered from a recurring nightmare in which a strange man is burned alive in her childhood home. The nightmare began when Kelly suffered amnesia after sustaining a head injury at age nine. Hoping to unravel the nightmare's meaning, Kelly pitches a term project idea to Peter, the graduate assistant in her psychology seminar, about it. Peter agrees to perform a sleep study on Kelly, but her mother, Frances, subsequently forbids it. Meanwhile, at a psychiatric hospital miles away, several patients escape, and a nurse is murdered. Dwight, Kelly's father, is notified of this incident by phone, and informs Frances.

Kelly prepares to partake in her sorority's initiation ritual which entails her and a group of other pledges breaking into her father's multilevel department store after hours and stealing the night porter's uniform. Kelly, her friend Marcia, and roommates Alison and Beth are the four main pledges. On the night of the initiation, Dwight departs for a business trip, but is brutally stabbed outside his car with a hand rake before being decapitated. The murderer leaves in Dwight's car with his corpse in the trunk.

Just before Kelly and the other pledges arrive at the department store, the night porter is murdered while doing rounds. Beth decides to quit, leaving Kelly, Marcia, and Alison alone. The three split up, and Kelly heads to the lounge upstairs to retrieve one of the spare uniforms. Meanwhile, head sorority sister Megan lets coeds Chad, Ralph, and Andy break into the store to scare the pledges. Shortly after, Andy is killed with a hatchet and Megan is shot to death with a bow and arrow. Ralph and Chad successfully scare Kelly and Marcia by hiding in a dressing room. After uniting with Alison, all five attempt to leave the store, but are locked inside.

At the university, Peter and his colleague, Heidi, comes across newspaper clippings detailing the fire Kelly described in her dream; the articles reveal the burning man's identity as Jason Randall, a floor manager at the Fairchild department store who was at one time married to Frances. Peter suspects that Jason is in fact Kelly's biological father, and that her nightmare is a memory of him being burned in an altercation with Frances' lover Dwight, who subsequently raised Kelly as his own daughter. A recent article on the inmates' revolt at the hospital reveals Jason is a groundskeeper there, and that he was among the prisoners who escaped. Peter drives to the Fairchild residence to notify Frances of his discoveries.

Alison and Chad wander around the store together. While Chad is in the bathroom, Alison discovers the night porter's body, followed by Chad's corpse in a bathroom stall. A traumatized Alison locates Kelly, who instructs her to hide at a security desk on the ground floor. Kelly enters the bathroom and sees Chad's body, as well as her name written in blood on a mirror. Meanwhile, Alison is attacked at the security desk and viciously stabbed to death.

Ralph and Marcia have sex in a retail display bed before Ralph is shot dead with a harpoon gun. Marcia flees through the store and is met by Kelly. They seek safety inside a freight elevator, but it is soon infiltrated by the killer who drags Marcia into the elevator shaft. Kelly escapes and flees into the store's boiler room, where she encounters Jason, whom she assumes to be the killer. He pursues her to the roof where she bludgeons him with a pipe, causing him to fall to the ground below.

Peter and Frances arrive at the store and find Jason lying on the ground, clinging to life. Inside, Peter sees whom he believes to be Kelly standing in the store foyer and embraces her before she stabs him in the stomach. Kelly stumbles upon the scene and is faced with a reflection of herself: Her disturbed twin sister Terry, who has been institutionalized since childhood when Frances left their father and married Dwight, and of whom Kelly has no memory. Just as Terry is about to murder Kelly, she is shot to death by Frances. Law enforcement arrives and Peter is taken away in an ambulance while Kelly stares at her mother in disbelief.

== Cast ==
- Daphne Zuniga as Kelly Fairchild / Terry Randall
- Vera Miles as Frances Fairchild
- Clu Gulager as Dwight Fairchild
- James Read as Peter Adams
- Marilyn Kagan as Marcia
- Robert Dowdell as Jason Randall
- Patti Heider as Nurse Higgins
- Frances Peterson as Megan
- Hunter Tylo as Alison
- Paula Knowles as Beth
- Trey Stroud as Ralph
- Peter Malof as Andy
- Christopher Bradley as Chad
- Joy Jones as Heidi
- Mary Davis Duncan as Gwen

== Production ==
=== Development ===
Screenwriter Charles Pratt Jr. wrote the script for the film after being asked to produce a low-budget horror film for executive producers Jock Gaynor and Bruce Lansbury, and producer Scott Winant for New World Pictures. While writing the screenplay, Pratt deliberately incorporated "soap opera" elements in the subplots involving the Fairchild family's history, as he was inspired by the genre at the time.

According to Pratt, he initially cobbled together the concept of the sorority initiation pledge taking place within a department store, but the concept had to be reworked when the film scouts were unable to find a suitable location in Dallas available for shooting. British director Peter Crane signed on to direct the project.

=== Casting ===
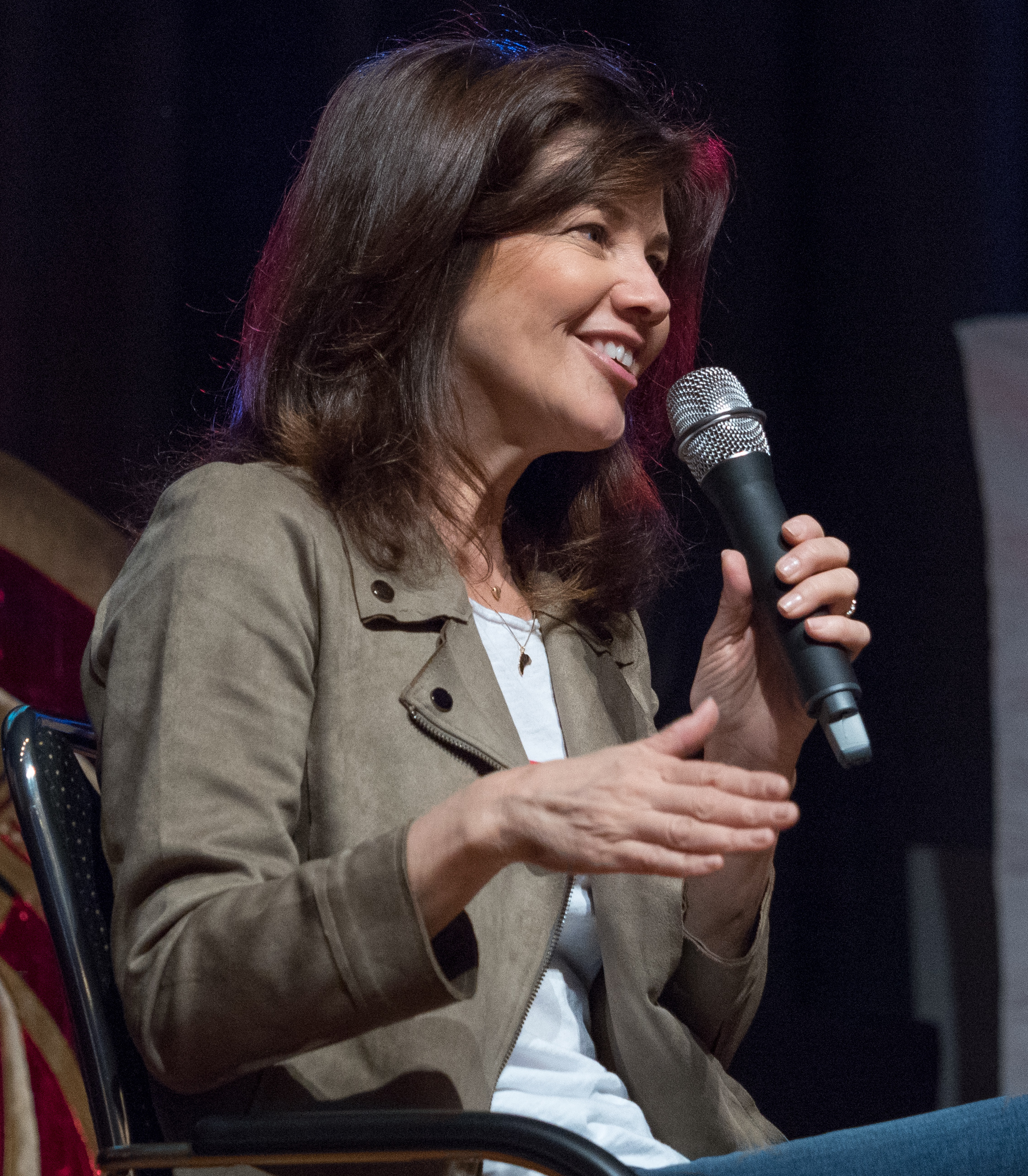
The film marked the first leading part for Daphne Zuniga, pictured here in 2018

Lead actress Daphne Zuniga was cast in the film following her minor role in the horror film The Dorm That Dripped Blood (1982), and was a student at the University of California, Los Angeles at the time of being cast. Recalling the experience, she said: "It was a great part. I got to play twins: a good sister and an evil sister. I got shot in the back on-screen. It was pretty heavy for a first role." The majority of the supporting cast were local actors from the Dallas-Fort Worth area, including Hunter Tylo and Joy Jones, both of whom were students at Brookhaven College.

Vera Miles, best known for her portrayal of Lila Crane in Alfred Hitchcock's Psycho (1960), was cast as the mother of Zuniga's character. Miles, though not impressed by the film's screenplay, agreed to appear in the film after having met the director, Peter Crane, with whom she had a quick rapport.

=== Filming ===
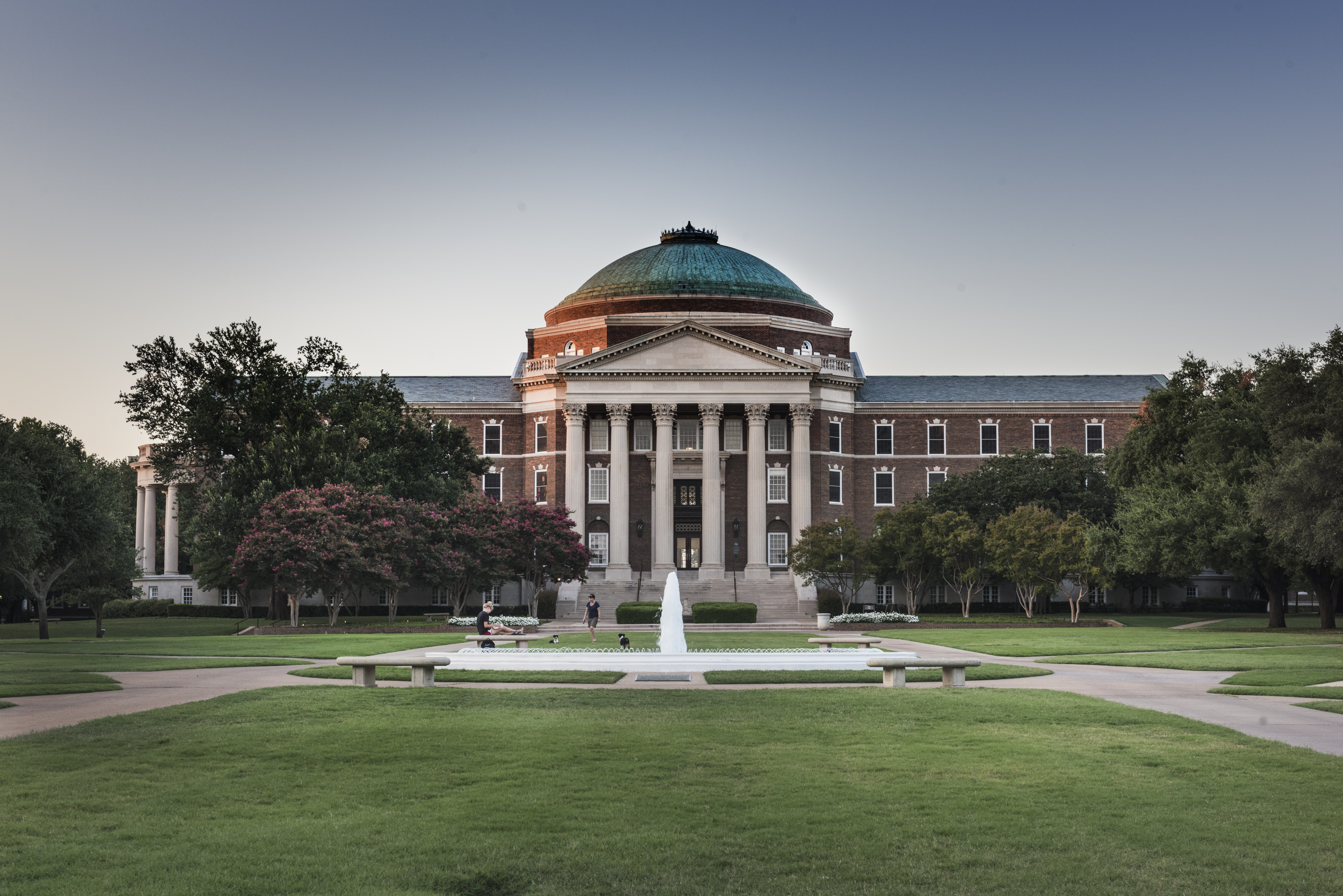
The campus scenes were filmed at Southern Methodist University

The Initiation was filmed on location in Fort Worth and Dallas, Texas, over an approximately 30-day period in the summer of 1983. The budget was approximately $3 million. Filming commenced with director Crane at the helm. After several days of filming, however, the shooting schedule had already fallen behind, leading to Crane being fired and replaced with Larry Stewart, who completed the rest of the film. The difference in technique and style between the two directors accounts for slight aesthetic differences in some of the film's sequences. According to writer Charles Pratt Jr., Crane was employing more experimental camera techniques, close-ups, and point-of-view shots, whereas Stewart, primarily a television director, used a more conventional style akin to that medium. Many of the early point-of-view shots featured in the film, as well as the sequences set at the psychiatric hospital, were all shot by Crane.

The multilevel World Trade Center building of the Dallas Market Center served as the location for the Fairchild department store, and the crew shot the film during evenings while the building was closed. The campus scenes were filmed at Southern Methodist University, while the dream-lab sequences were shot in an abandoned Holiday Inn hotel, where the production design had refitted a maid's closet to appear as the laboratory.

Zuniga portrays dual roles in the film, with both characters appearing together in the film's finale. Zuniga commented on the way this was achieved: "There was no CGI [back then] of course, so they had to lock down the camera and I would literally get on one side of frame, yell and scream, and they would freeze and I would have to go and change my make-up, costume and hair and come back, get on the other side facing the other way and fear for my life. I haven’t seen that movie I think since we made it, but there are some scenes where I’m all in one frame where they overlay those two—I don’t know how they did it."

== Release ==
The Initiation first screened in the United States in the spring of 1984, with showings beginning in Fresno, California and Lexington, Kentucky during the weekend of April 6, and in Philadelphia beginning April 28, 1984. (Note: Contemporaneous newspaper sources from Philadelphia date the film as a new release for the weekend of April 28, 1984, and reviews were also published that day.) It subsequently opened in Silver Spring, Maryland, beginning on May 12, 1984. In some midwestern cities, such as Bloomington, Illinois, it was paired as a drive-in double-feature with The Texas Chain Saw Massacre (1974). It was released several months later in Baltimore on September 7, 1984. The Los Angeles Times reported a tentative autumn release of the film in Los Angeles. The film opened on December 7, 1984 in several southern U.S. cities, including Shreveport, Pensacola, and Jackson.

The film was largely overshadowed at the U.S. box office by Wes Craven's A Nightmare on Elm Street, also released in the fall of 1984. It screened sporadically throughout the country, playing in one- or two-week runs. Although it passed the MPAA's restrictions without being cut, the British Board of Film Classification cut nearly a minute of gore from the film, specifically from Hunter Tylo's gratuitous murder scene.

=== Home media ===
The Initiation was released on VHS by Thorn EMI in December 1984. In the United Kingdom, VHS and Betamax editions were released by CBS/Fox Video.

Anchor Bay Entertainment released the film on DVD in November 2002. The following year, Anchor Bay reissued it on a double feature DVD paired with Mountaintop Motel Massacre (1984). The film was later reissued on DVD in 2011 by Image Entertainment's "Midnight Madness" Series.

In August 2016, it was revealed that Arrow Films would be releasing the film for the first time on Blu-ray in both the United States and the United Kingdom. It was released in the United States on November 8, 2016. As of October 2024, this Blu-ray was out of print.

== Reception ==
=== Critical response ===
Joe Baltake of the Philadelphia Daily News wrote that the film was "convoluted, contemporary, and evil... This is a Freudian slip-of-a-horror-film, far more complex than truly frightening." Rick Lyman of The Philadelphia Inquirer likened the film to its contemporary "sorority girl slasher movies," concluding: "All of this is tied up in a surprise denouement that's about as surprising as, well, a knock-knock joke." The Baltimore Evening Sun's Lou Cedrone wrote that the film was "not so gory as most of the slice-and-dice genre," comparing it to Friday the 13th (1980) and Sleepaway Camp (1983), but added: "The Initiation may be a little better than similar features, if only because it is a little less bloody." In a subsequent review, Cedrone characterized the film as a "Friday the 13th clone," and added: "Vera Miles and Clu Gulager are performers caught in this hapless mess." Candice Russell of the South Florida Sun Sentinel awarded the film one-and-a-half out of four stars, referring to it as "an uncomfortable pastiche of scenes we've seen before," and likened elements of it to Brian De Palma's Sisters (1973).

Sharon Johnson of The Patriot-News praised the film for offering "a reasonable amount of suspense, a surprise ending that doesn't cheat and a complex plot that will never bore you," concluding that, "the movie as a whole holds together rather well."

Writing for the Manchester Evening News, Rodger Clark deemed the film "a fairly standard shock horror movie" and recommended it "only for avid horror fans."

=== Modern assessment ===
Following the film's first DVD release in 2002, Film Threat gave it an unfavorable review, writing, "The Initiation is the latest forgotten horror film to receive the Anchor Bay DVD treatment, and I'd be at a loss to tell you why." Film School Rejects, however, said the film "has all the hallmarks of being an awful movie without being an awful movie... it’s fun, and that should count for something." Eric Snider, writing for Film.com in 2012, gave the film a negative review, calling it "a bad movie with bad ideas that are badly executed," while TV Guide summarized the film as "boring slasher stuff," noting that "Top-billed [Vera] Miles and [Clu] Gulager barely appear in the film, which would make a terrifically dreadful double bill with the similar The Dorm That Dripped Blood (1983), also featuring Zuniga."

Film critic John Kenneth Muir writes in his book Horror Films of the 1980s, Volume 2 (2010) that "the popular 1980s slasher paradigm gets another muscular work-out in The Initiation, a film loaded with formula ingredients," deeming it a "competent but derivative slasher," but notes that the film's "hoped-for momentum never kicks in."

Brian Collins, writing for the Alamo Drafthouse's film journal, Birth.Movies.Death., noted that the film "might be worth a look for slasher aficionados—it's far from a perfect film, but there are some unusual elements to it that give it enough personality to overcome its somewhat sluggish pace and TV movie-esque production." Dread Central's Anthony Arrigo observed in a 2016 review "a surprising amount of character depth on display here, more so than similar pictures of the era."

In Legacy of Blood: A Comprehensive Guide to Slasher Movie, writer Jim Harper called the film a "lackluster effort that never quite lives up to the abilities of its cast," further noting: "Even with the soap opera ending, the film isn't entirely successful, mostly because of the terrible script. There's a wealth of unnecessary jargon and cheap dialogue, not to mention some notable inconsistencies. Zuniga does her best to rise above the bad material and turns in a great performance, but Gulager and Miles sleepwalk through their parts." Horror film scholar Adam Rockoff alternately notes in his book Going to Pieces: The Rise and Fall of the Slasher Film, that, "despite its proclivity for laughable dialogue and silly plot twists, [The Initiation] manages to be a fairly entertaining and occasionally frightening film."

Edge Media Network's Ken Tasho, when reviewing the film's 2016 Blu-ray release, praised it, noting: "The Initiation, while hardly original, takes elements from soap operas and dramas in its writing approach; it's a unique spin on the tried-and-true 1980's slasher formula." Max Deacon of Scream magazine wrote that the film may divide audiences, noting: "Director Larry Stewart does have some visual flair, filing the shots with typical Freudian images—mirrors are ubiquitous throughout—to reflect Kelly’s ever-fluctuating mindset. But where this film is won or lost is in the twist at the very end of the film, which will either be seen as shockingly innovative or entirely ridiculous depending on the viewer."

Irrespective of the film's critical reception, it has garnered a contemporary cult following.

== Sources ==
- Stine, Scott Aaron (2003). The Gorehound's Guide to Splatter Films of the 1980s. Jefferson, North Carolina: McFarland. ISBN 978-1-476-61132-7.
- Harper, Jim (2004). Legacy of Blood: A Comprehensive Guide to Slasher Movies. Manchester: Critical Vision. ISBN 978-1-900-48639-2. OCLC 805288440.
- Muir, John Kenneth (2012). Horror Films of the 1980s. Jefferson, North Carolina: McFarland. ISBN 978-0-786-47298-7.
- Rockoff, Adam (2002). Going to Pieces: The Rise and Fall of the Slasher Film, 1978–1986. Jefferson, North Carolina: McFarland. ISBN 978-0-786-49192-6.
