= Spaceballs: The New One =

Upcoming parody film by Josh Greenbaum

- Teaser poster
- Directed by: Josh Greenbaum
- Written by: Josh Gad; Dan Hernandez Benji Samit
- Based on: Spaceballs by: Mel Brooks; Thomas Meehan; Ronny Graham
- Produced by: Mel Brooks; Josh Gad; Josh Greenbaum; Kevin Salter; Jeb Brody; Brian Grazer; Ron Howard
- Starring: Mel Brooks; Rick Moranis; Bill Pullman; Lewis Pullman; Keke Palmer; Daphne Zuniga; George Wyner; Josh Gad; Anthony Carrigan
- Cinematography: Jeff Cutter
- Music by: Dara Taylor
- Production companies: Metro-Goldwyn-Mayer; Imagine Entertainment; Brooksfilms
- Distributed by: Amazon MGM Studios
- Release date: April 23, 2027
- Country: United States
- Language: English

Spaceballs: The New One is an upcoming American space opera comedy film directed by Josh Greenbaum and written by Josh Gad, Dan Hernandez and Benji Samit. It serves as the sequel to Spaceballs (1987). The film sees Mel Brooks, Rick Moranis, Bill Pullman, George Wyner, and Daphne Zuniga reprising their roles from the previous film, while Lewis Pullman, Keke Palmer, Josh Gad, and Anthony Carrigan join the cast. Like its predecessor, the film will primarily be a parody of the Star Wars franchise, but will also parody other popular media.

Spaceballs: The New One is scheduled to be released by Amazon MGM Studios in the United States on April 23, 2027.

== Premise ==
Forty years after the events of the first film, Dark Helmet has returned. Lone Starr has gone into hiding, while Queen Vespa attends to her royal duties, so the duty falls to Prince Starburst, Vespa's son, and Destiny, a royal advisor, to find Lone Starr and other allies to defeat the new threat.

== Cast ==
- Mel Brooks as:
  - Yogurt
  - President Skroob
- Bill Pullman as King Lone Starr
- Rick Moranis as Lord Dark Helmet
- Lewis Pullman as Prince Starburst, Lone Starr and Vespa's son
- Keke Palmer as Destiny, a mysterious Palace advisor
- Daphne Zuniga as Queen Vespa
- George Wyner as Colonel Sandurz

Josh Gad will play a "Mawg", the species of John Candy's character Barf from the original film. Additionally, Anthony Carrigan and Rowan Witt have been cast in undisclosed roles.

== Production ==
In a 2013 interview, Rick Moranis said that he and Mel Brooks had discussed a potential sequel to Spaceballs (1987), with Moranis pitching the title Spaceballs III: The Search for Spaceballs II. However, he and Brooks were unable to structure a deal that would allow the project to move forward. In February 2015, Brooks said that he would like to make a sequel to be released after the next Star Wars film and hoped that Moranis would reprise his role. At the time, Brooks said the film may be called Spaceballs 2: The Search for More Money, based on a throwaway fourth wall quote from the first film. However, during an interview with Daily Blast Live in February 2020, Bill Pullman said, "It's up to Mel. Ask him if he has too much money and that's why he doesn't do it".

In June 2024, it was reported that Amazon MGM Studios was developing a direct sequel to Spaceballs, with Josh Greenbaum directing and Josh Gad, Dan Hernandez and Benji Samit writing the screenplay, with Gad also cast in the film and Mel Brooks producing. During the COVID-19 pandemic, Gad was asked to do an episode of History of the World, Part II, which he enjoyed, but then he realized that his daughter had not seen any of Brooks' films, so he showed her the original Spaceballs film, after which she asked if they could see the second part. He explained to her that there was not one and she pointed out Yogurt's mention of such film, to which Gad explained to her it was a joke, but then, he went to bed and dreamed about what a possible Spaceballs sequel could be about, leading to the genesis of The New One, which started with Gad as he then approached so many collaborators, particularly Brooks and Moranis. In June 2025, it was announced that Brooks, Pullman, Moranis, and Daphne Zuniga would be returning for the sequel, with Keke Palmer and Pullman's son, Lewis joining the film, cast as Destiny and Starburst. Brian Grazer was also announced to be joining the producing team through Imagine Entertainment. It was also announced that the film would release in 2027. In September 2025, it was announced that George Wyner would reprise his role of Colonel Sandurz and that Anthony Carrigan had joined the cast in an undisclosed role.

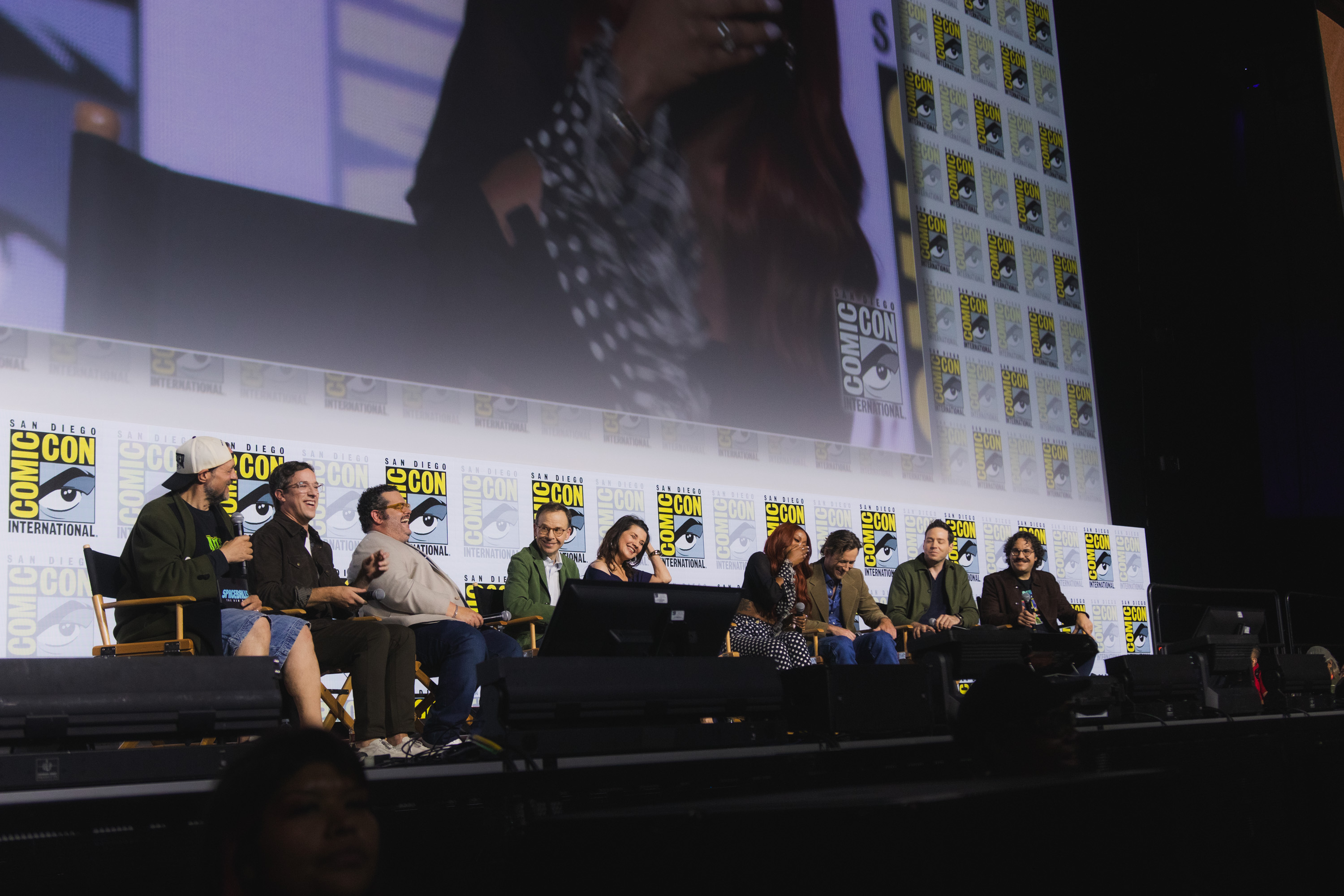
The cast of Spaceballs: The New One at the 2026 San Diego Comic-Con

The film's official title, Spaceballs: The New One, was unveiled at CinemaCon in April 2026. Brooks joked that it was no longer called The Search for More Money because he had found the money in his basement. One of the film's jokes displayed in the CinemaCon footage was a parody of the Na'vi from James Cameron's Avatar franchise using a urinal. Gad did not ask Cameron for permission as he felt the spoof was in "the grand tradition" with Brooks' films—such as the Alien parody in the original Spaceballs or The Godfather parody in Robin Hood: Men in Tights—and unlike those from the Scary Movie film series, as they are "all part of the fabric of the narrative".

=== Filming ===
Principal photography began on September 16, 2025, in Sydney, with Jeff Cutter serving as the cinematographer. Gad said filming had been completed and wrapped by December 1, 2025. According to Zuniga, Brooks had asked for his scenes to be shot before the rest of the cast as he said "You better film me now because I’m 100."

=== Post-production ===
In July 2026, it was announced that Dara Taylor would compose the film's score, marking her fourth collaboration with director Josh Greenbaum following Barb and Star Go to Vista Del Mar, Strays and The Dink. Brooks portrayed the character Yogurt as CGI motion capture in order to spare the 100-year-old actor from needing to use extensive makeup as used in the original film.

== Release ==
Spaceballs: The New One is scheduled to be released in the United States on April 23, 2027.
