= Karen Austin =

American actress

- Born: October 24, 1955 (age 70); Welch, West Virginia, USA
- Occupation: Actress
- Years active: 1974–2015
- Known for: Night Court
- Spouse: Kris Slava (m. 1975; div. 1982)

Karen Austin is an American actress. She played Lana Wagner on the sitcom Night Court in 1984. Her film appearances include Summer Rental (1985), Far from Home (1989), and The Rum Diary (2011).

== Career ==
Austin first gained notability in the late 1970s with a string of television guest appearances on highly rated programs such as Happy Days, The Rockford Files, CHiPs, and Dallas. In the 1980s, she was a regular on the first season of the successful NBC comedy series Night Court as court clerk Lana Wagner for the first 10 episodes (but she received credits for all 13 episodes of the first season). She was asked to leave the series due to her recently diagnosed Bell's palsy which producers believed was affecting her performance. Her character was replaced by Mac Robinson (Charles Robinson) for the remaining eight seasons. Austin had a lead role as the wife of John Candy's character in Summer Rental (1985).

== Personal life ==
Austin was married to Kris Slava at age 19; the couple divorced seven years later.

== Film and television credits ==
Year	TV/Film Credit	Role	Notes
1974	The Ottawa Valley	Lena	TV short film
1978	Happy Days	Peggy Clark	Episode: "Kid Stuff"
1978	The Rockford Files	Veronica Teasedale	Episode: "White on White and Nearly Perfect"
1978	The American Girls		Episode: "Little Girl Lost"
1978	Dallas	Dailey	Episode: "Survival"
1979	Fish Hawk	Mrs. Gideon	Feature film
1979	The Misadventures of Sheriff Lobo	Lily	Episode: "Dean Martin and the Moonshiners"
1979	Hart to Hart	Karen Shields	Episode: "A New Kind of High"
1979	Soap	Chester's Woman	Episode #3.10
1980	Family	Emily	2 episodes
1980–1982	Three's Company	Jennifer / Denise	2 episodes
1981	Hill Street Blues	West Virginia	3 episodes
1981	CHiPs	Woman with Rabbit	Episode: "A Simple Operation"
1981	S.O.B.	Piano Girl	Feature film (Uncredited role)
1982	The Quest	Carrie Welby	Main role (9 episodes)
1982	A Piano for Mrs. Cimino	Alice Cimino	TV movie
1982	Quincy, M.E.	Rachael Kane	Episode: "The Shadow of Death"
1983	The Taming of the Shrew	Katherina	Feature film
1983	Trauma Center	Julie	Episode: "Trauma Center (Pilot)"
1984	Celebrity	Ceil Shannon	TV miniseries
1984	Night Court	Lana Wagner	10 episodes
1984	London and Davis in New York	Adrienne Crow	Television pilot
1985	St. Elsewhere	Dr. Mary Woodley	5 episodes
1985	Summer Rental	Sandy Chester	Feature film
1985	Jagged Edge	Julie Jensen	Feature film
1985	Our Family Honor	Detective Sgt. Sharon Howland	Episode: "End of the Line"
1985	A Letter to Three Wives	Kate	TV movie
1986	The Twilight Zone	June Wright	Segment: "A Matter of Minutes"
1986	L.A. Law	Hillary Mishkin	3 episodes
1986	The Ladies Club	Joan Taylor	Feature film
1986	Penalty Phase	Julie	Feature film
1986	Assassin	Mary Casallas	TV movie
1987	Jake and the Fatman	Rebecca Warfield	Episode: "Fatal Attraction"
1988	Laura Lansing Slept Here	Melody Gomphers	TV movie
1989	Columbo	Dr. Paula Hall	Episode: "Columbo Goes to the Guillotine"
1989	Dolphin Cove	Lisa Ruddick	Episode: "The Initiation of Lisa Ruddick"
1989	The Case of the Hillside Stranglers	J.D. Jackson	TV movie
1989	Far from Home	Louise	Feature film
1990	Hunter	Lt. Megan Malone	Episode: "Unfinished Business"
1990	A Girl to Kill For	Karen / Shopper	Feature film
1991	Midnight Caller	Jenna Holloway	Episode: "Her Dirty Little Secret"
1991–1992	The Trials of Rosie O'Neill	Sheila Crane / Suzanne	6 episodes
1992–1994	The Commish	Linda Scott	2 episodes
1994	Moment of Truth: Murder or Memory?	Connie Frawley	TV movie
1994	Lightning Jack	Mama Wheeler	Feature film (Uncredited role)
1995	Live Shot	Helen Forbes	8 episodes
1995	The Marshal	Ellen Christopher	Episode: "Time Off for Clever Behavior"
1995–1999	Sliders	Amanda Starr / Lydia the Secretary	2 episodes
1996	Mr. & Mrs. Smith	Haley Rodgers Johnson	Episode: "The Big Easy Episode"
1996	NYPD Blue	Jessica Herman	Episode: "The Nutty Confessor"
1996	Star Trek: Deep Space Nine	Dr. Kalandra	Episode: "...Nor the Battle to the Strong"
1996	Lazarus	Anne	Feature film
1997	Aaahh!!! Real Monsters	Cimmarron Kilkenny (voice)	Episode: "Showdown/Internal Affairs"
1997	Breast Men	Dr. Tammy	TV movie (Uncredited role)
1997	House of Frankenstein	Irene Lassiter	TV miniseries
1997	Murder One	Lynette Parker	4 episodes
1997	Murder One: Diary of a Serial Killer	Lynette Parker Banks	TV miniseries
1997	Step by Step	Patti Roberts	Episode: "Just Say Maybe"
1998	Best Friends for Life	Violet Evans	TV movie
1998	3rd Rock from the Sun	Anita	Episode: "Auto Eurodicka"
1998	JAG	Dr. Inge	Episode: "The Martin Baker Fan Club"
1998	Martial Law	Elaine Caranza	Episode: "How Sammo Got His Groove Back"
1998	The Battery	Sandy	Short film
1998	Touched by an Angel	Candace	Episode: "Last Dance"
1999	Beverly Hills, 90210	Bobbi Kincaid	2 episodes
1999	Profiler	Candice Harding	Episode: "Original Sin"
1999	Rescue 77	Ruth Caraway	Episode: "The Wedding"
1999	Star Trek: Voyager	Miral, B'Elanna Torres' Mother	Episode: "Barge of the Dead"
2000	Lost in the Pershing Point Hotel	Pierrepont Summers	Feature film
2001	The Division	Helen	Episode: "Redemption"
2002	ER	Mrs. Carlson	Episode: "Bygones"
2002	Taken	Nun #2	TV miniseries
2002–2004	Girlfriends	Sandy Bickie	3 episodes
2004	Cold Case	Terri Maxwell	Episode: "Volunteers"
2004	Kingdom Hospital	Mrs. Powell	Episode: "Black Noise"
2004–2008	Rodney	Patsy	3 episodes
2005	Freddie	Mrs. Reyerson	Episode: "I'll Be Homeless for Christmas"
2005	Wanted	Taffy Dibortello	Episode: "Sex Pistols"
2005	Without a Trace	Hilda	Episode: "Second Sight"
2005	Desperate Housewives	Lois McDaniel	Episode: "Your Fault"
2006	Amber's Story	Glenda Whitson	TV movie
2006	The Evidence	Mrs. Vicarrio	Episode: "Pilot"
2007	Crossing Jordan	Sarah Fulton	Episode: "Falling From Grace"
2008	Battlestar Galactica	Lilly	Episode: "Escape Velocity"
2008	Palisades Pool Party	Desiree	TV movie
2009	Bitch Slap	Narrator	Feature film
2009	CSI: Miami	Judge Gloria Stets	Episode: "Dissolved"
2009	Sink or Swim	Judge Stets	Feature film
2009	Big Days Ahead	Carol Glass	Short film
2010	Better People	Jacquie	TV movie
2010	Order of Chaos	Sherri	Feature film
2011–2012	Fresh Hell	Valerie	4 episodes
2011–2015	Whole Day Down	DeWitt	6 episodes
2011	The Rum Diary	Mrs. Zimburger	Feature film
2013	Sweet Talk	Newsvendor / Nurse	Feature film
2014	Infamous Second Son	Betty (voice)	Video game
2015	The Wicked Within	Jean	Feature film
