= Daphne Zuniga =

American actress (born 1962)

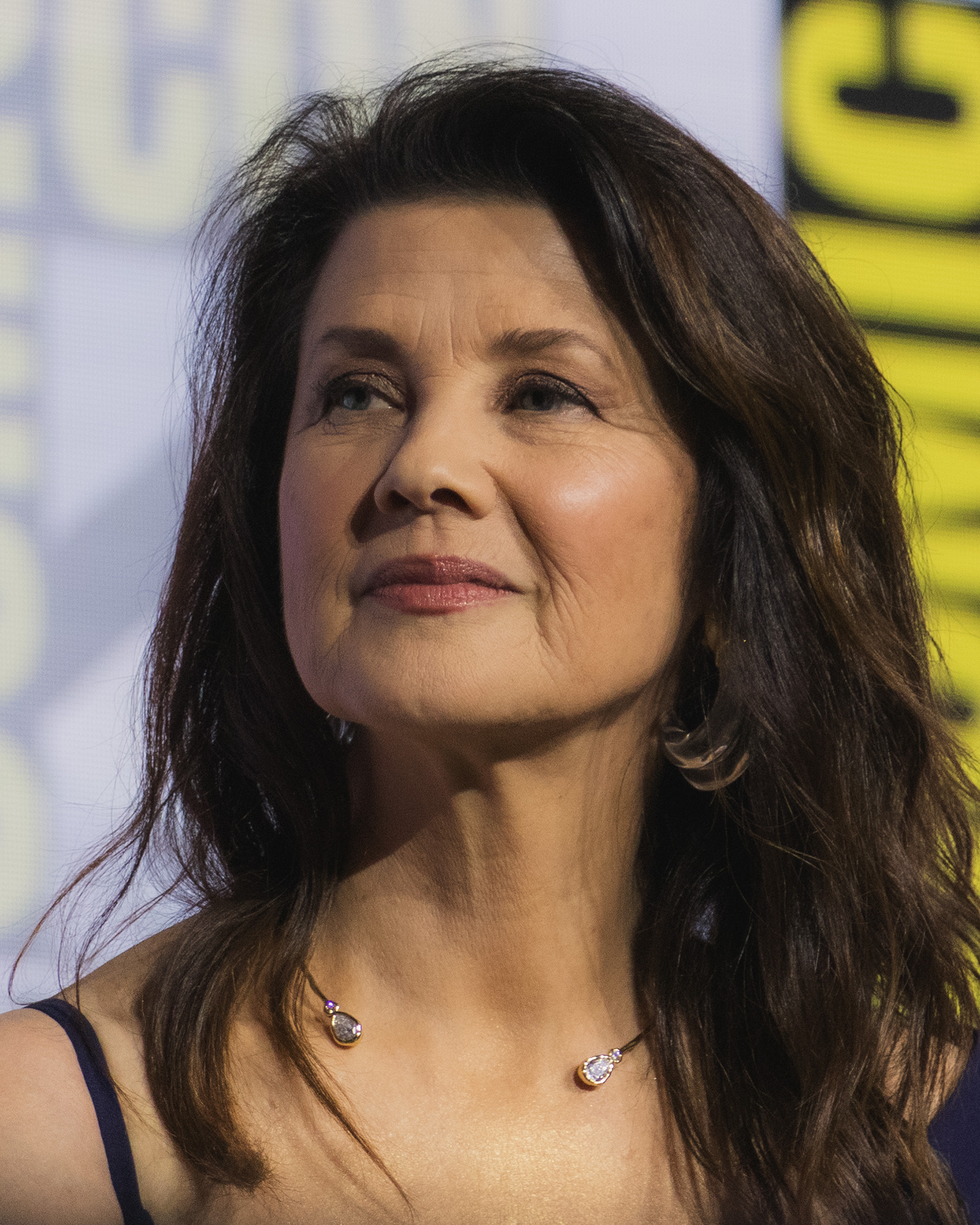
- Zuniga at the 2026 San Diego Comic Con
- Born: Daphne Eurydice Zuniga; October 28, 1962 (age 64); San Francisco, California, U.S.
- Education: University of California, Los Angeles
- Occupation: Actress
- Years active: 1980–present
- Spouse: David Mleczko (m. 2019)

Daphne Eurydice Zuniga (/zəˈniːɡə/; born October 28, 1962) is an American actress. Following her film debut in The Dorm That Dripped Blood (1982), Zuniga had lead roles in films such as The Initiation (1984), Vision Quest (1985), The Sure Thing (1985), Modern Girls (1986), Last Rites (1988), Gross Anatomy, and The Fly II (both 1989). She is best known for her lead role as Princess Vespa in the space opera parody film Spaceballs (1987), and will reprise her role in the sequel Spaceballs: The New One, which is scheduled for a release in April 2027.

She is also known for her lead roles as Jo Reynolds on the Fox primetime soap opera Melrose Place (1992–1996) and Lynn Kerr on the Freeform drama series Beautiful People (2005–2006), as well as her recurring role as Victoria Davis on The CW teen drama series One Tree Hill (2008–2012).

Zuniga has been active in environmental issues since the mid-2000s, and was a founding member of the Earth Communications Office. She has also worked with the Natural Resources Defense Council, the Waterkeeper Alliance, and Environment California.

== Early life ==
Zuniga was born in San Francisco, California, on October 28, 1962, to Agnes (née Janawicz) and Joaquin Alberto Zuniga Mazariegos. Her mother is a Unitarian minister of Polish and Finnish descent, and her Guatemalan father was a professor of philosophy at California State University, East Bay who fled Guatemala for political reasons after the exile of President Jacobo Árbenz. She has one sister, Jennifer Zuniga. In her early teens, Zuniga expressed interest in acting, and attended the Young Conservatory program of the American Conservatory Theater of San Francisco.

After her parents divorced, Zuniga moved with her mother and sister from Berkeley, California, to Reading, Vermont, where she spent the remainder of her teen years. Zuniga graduated from Woodstock Union High School in Woodstock, Vermont, in 1980, after which she returned to California and enrolled in the three-year theater program at the University of California, Los Angeles. After leaving college, Zuniga was close friends and roommates with fellow actress Meg Ryan. In Los Angeles, Zuniga studied acting with Larry Moss and Peggy Feury at the Loft Studio.

== Career ==
=== Early work ===
Zuniga made her film debut in Stephen Carpenter's slasher film The Dorm That Dripped Blood (1982), playing a supporting role as a college student. Two years later, she made her lead debut in The Initiation, another college-themed slasher co-starring Vera Miles and Clu Gulager. "It was a great part," Zuniga recalled. "I got to play twins: a good sister and an evil sister. I got shot in the back on-screen. It was pretty heavy for a first role."

She then appeared in the drama Vision Quest (1985), followed by a lead role in Rob Reiner's The Sure Thing (1985), opposite John Cusack. The film was critically praised; critic Roger Ebert said of the film: "The movie industry seems better at teenage movies like Porky's, with its sleazy shower scenes, than with screenplays that involve any sort of thought about the love lives of its characters. That's why The Sure Thing is a small miracle." Shortly after, Zuniga was cast in the television drama film Stone Pillow (1985), playing a social worker in New York City who forms a bond with an elderly homeless woman, played by Lucille Ball. She also appeared in the comedy Modern Girls (1986), opposite Cynthia Gibb and Virginia Madsen.

In 1987, Zuniga was cast as Princess Vespa in Mel Brooks's comedy Spaceballs, opposite Rick Moranis, Bill Pullman, and John Candy. Though the film received mixed critical reception, it later garnered a cult following. The next year, Zuniga appeared in a lead role in the blockbuster horror film The Fly II (1988), followed by the drama-comedy Staying Together (1989), and as a med student opposite Matthew Modine in the drama Gross Anatomy (1989).

=== Melrose Place, film, and television ===
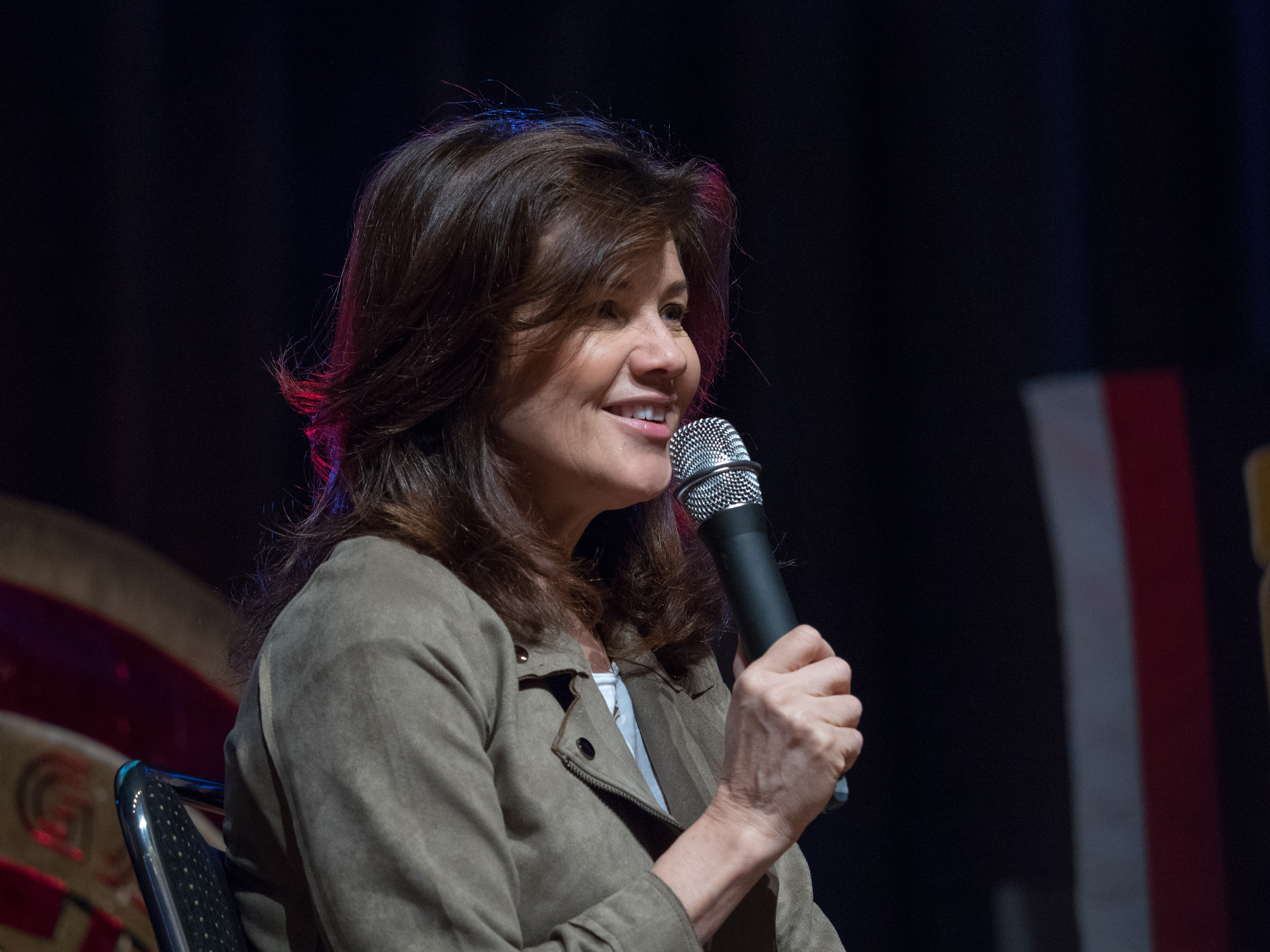
Zuniga at FedCon in Germany, 2018.

In 1992, she was cast as Jo Reynolds in the Fox soap opera Melrose Place, and appeared on the show as a regular character until 1996. The role garnered Zuniga major exposure to television audiences, though her television career had begun in the early eighties with a minor role on Family Ties (1984) as a girlfriend of Alex P. Keaton. She also appeared in the 1995 miniseries Degree of Guilt.

In 1994, Zuniga appeared in the release of a video for Bob Seger's previously released 1976 hit "Night Moves". In the video version of the song, she and a pre-Friends Matt LeBlanc are shown in a 1960s drive-in theater, where Zuniga as a dark, edgy young woman becomes a visual fascination for LeBlanc as a clean-cut young man. In 2000, Zuniga appeared as a bartender in the music video for Evan and Jaron's single "Crazy for This Girl".

Later, Zuniga would work as a voice actor on the animated television series Stories from My Childhood (1998), and also had a lead role in the miniseries Pandora's Clock (1996), an action thriller filmed in Seattle, Washington.

From 2005 to 2006, she was cast as Lynn Kerr on the ABC family series Beautiful People, and also had a recurring role in the series American Dreams. She also appeared in a recurring role as Victoria Davis on The CW series One Tree Hill between 2008 and 2012, appearing in over forty episodes. During this time, she appears in several made-for-television movies including Secret Lives (2005), The Obsession (2006), Christmas Do-Over (2006), Mail Order Bride (2008), and On Strike for Christmas (2010).

In 2007, Zuniga co-produced and co-directed (with Steven Latham) the documentary "The Future We Will Create: Inside the World of TED" — a look at the annual Technology, Entertainment and Design conference held in Monterey, California. She also starred in the scripted web series Novel Adventures, which premiered November 3, 2008 from CBS Interactive. In February and March 2008, Zuniga appeared onstage in a production of The Scene by Theresa Rebeck, at the San Francisco Playhouse.

Zuniga reprised her role as Princess Vespa from the 1987 film Spaceballs, by voice-over in the television spin-off Spaceballs: The Animated Series. She also reprised her role from Melrose Place in an updated version, but it was short-lived, as the series was cancelled after just one season in 2009–10. She starred in 2010 in the hit Hallmark Channel film A Family Thanksgiving. In 2013, Zuniga appeared as a postal worker in the Hallmark Channel series Signed, Sealed, Delivered, as well as the television film based on the series and in Gone Missing with Lauren Bowles.

Zuniga appeared in a guest starring role in the VH1 scripted series Hindsight as Libby. In 2016, she was cast in a new TV movie for Hallmark Channel, When Duty Calls, with Judd Nelson and Daniella Monet.

More recently, Zuniga starred in Heartbeats, Witness Unprotected and A Christmas Arrangement with Miles Fisher.

In 2018, Zuniga directed her first feature film, The Protégé, with Keenan Tracey and Jeannette Sousa. It was released in 2019 under the title Deadly Assistant.

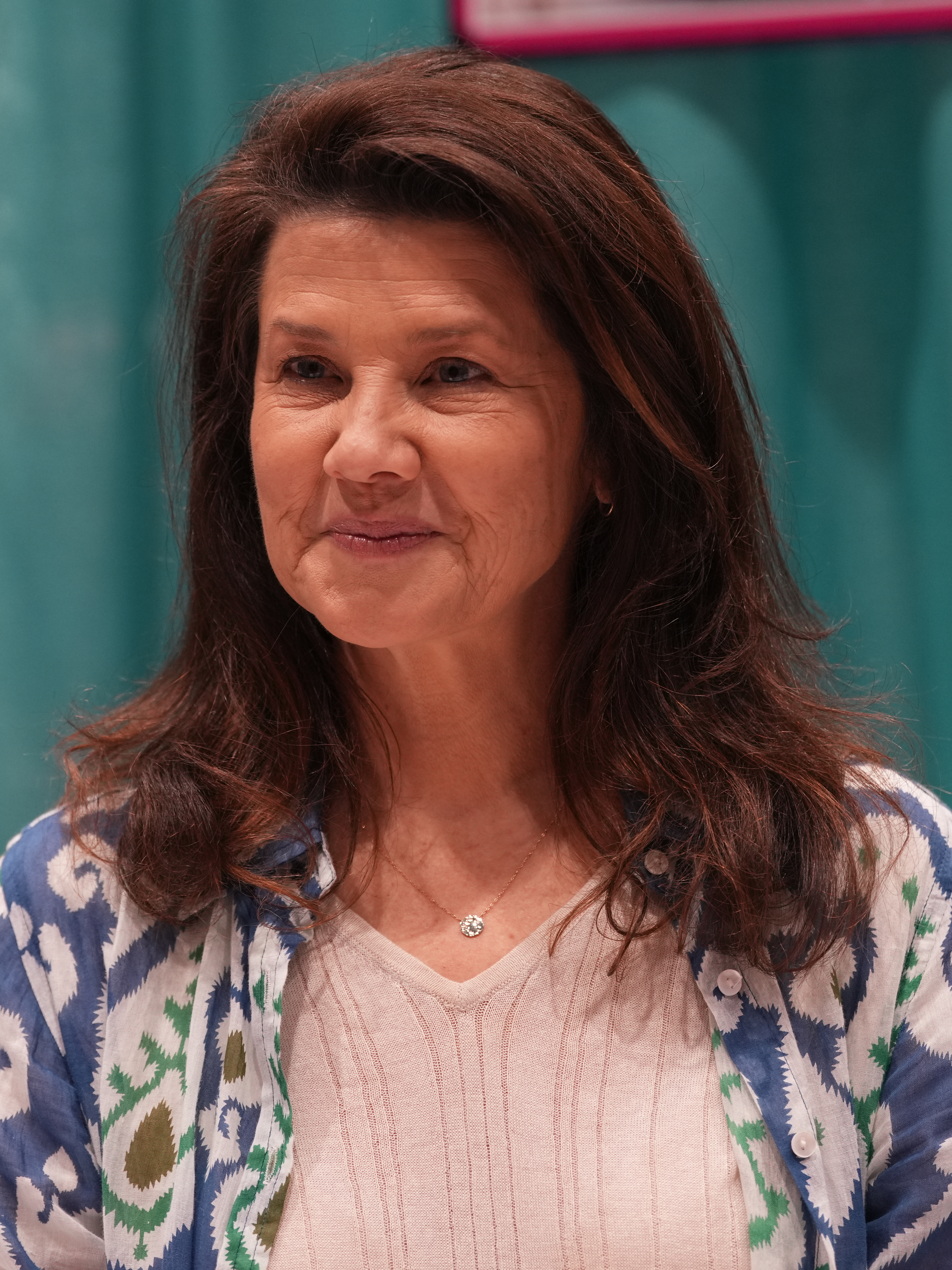
Zuniga at GalaxyCon Oklahoma City in May 2024.

In 2019, she co-starred in the television film Gates Of Paradise, opposite Lizzie Boys and Jason Priestley, and Christmas In Paris with Karl E. Ländler. In 2020, she was a guest star in NCIS as Stacy Gordon, Navy commander.

In 2021, she was a guest star in Fantasy Island as Margot, with her old Melrose Place co-stars Josie Bissett and Laura Leighton. In 2022, Zuniga appeared on Dynasty as Sonya Jackson, alongside another old Melrose Place co-star Grant Show.

Since 2024, Zuniga, along with Leighton and Courtney Thorne-Smith, have hosted an IHeartRadio podcast, Still The Place.

In April 2024, it was announced that a Melrose Place reboot was in development, with Zuniga joining Leighton and Heather Locklear in the cast.

In June 2025, it was announced that Zuniga would reprise her role as Princess Vespa for the upcoming Spaceballs sequel, Spaceballs: The New One, which will be directed by Josh Greenbaum and is scheduled for release in 2027.

2026, she join the cast of the movie Love Song for My Texas Ranger. She is joined by Ryan Rottman (90210), Tammin Sursok (Pretty Little Liars), and Jana Kramer (One Tree Hill).

== Activism ==
Zuniga has cited her family's camping trips to Yosemite National Park and Yellowstone as sparking her lifelong interest in the environment. "The planet does nothing but support us," she said in a 2007 interview, "and we are constantly committing crimes against nature." Zuniga has supported several environmental campaigns: In 2009, she was appointed by Los Angeles Mayor Antonio Villaraigosa to the Board of Directors of the Los Angeles River Revitalization Corporation, a not-for-profit development corporation charged with catalyzing sustainable development along the Los Angeles River.

Zuniga was a founding member of the Earth Communications Office (ECO), and has worked with the Natural Resources Defense Council, the Waterkeeper Alliance, and Environment California.

In addition to environmental causes, Zuniga has been active in the Multiple Sclerosis Foundation, the AIDS Project Los Angeles, and the Southwest Voter Registration Education Project.

== Personal life ==
Zuniga's younger sister Jennifer, also an actress, debuted in the film A Woman, Her Men, and Her Futon (1992). Zuniga attends private Buddhist meditation retreats to manage stress in her life.

In 2004, Zuniga suffered from mercury poisoning, which she attributed to overconsumption of fish. She said she had eaten sushi four times in the week prior to being taken to the emergency room and that her symptoms included weak memory, headaches, crying spells, rashes, and mild depression. After her diagnosis, Zuniga stopped consuming fish in addition to other meat.

Zuniga began dating businessman David Mleczko, whom she met on a blind date, in 2006. The two married in a private ceremony in Cambridge, Massachusetts, on June 8, 2019.

== Filmography ==
=== Film ===
Year	Title	Role	Notes
1982	The Dorm That Dripped Blood	Debbie	
1984	The Initiation	Kelly Fairchild/Terry Fairchild	
1985	Vision Quest	Margie Epstein	
1985	The Sure Thing	Alison Bradbury	
1986	Modern Girls	Margo	
1987	Spaceballs	Princess Vespa	
1988	Last Rites	Angela	
1989	The Fly II	Beth Logan	
1989	Staying Together	Beverly Young	
1989	Gross Anatomy	Laurie Rorbach	
1992	Mad at the Moon	Young Mrs. Miller	
1993	Eight Hundred Leagues Down the Amazon	Minha	
1994	Charlie's Ghost Story	Ronda	
1994	Cityscrapes: Los Angeles	Chantal	
1997	Naked in the Cold Sun	Rini	
1997	Stand-ins	Shirley	
2000	Artificial Lies	Karen Wettering	
2000	Enemies of Laughter	Judy	
2005	Secret Lives	Jill Thompson	
2006	A-List	Tina	
2008	Mail Order Bride	Diana McQueen	
2010	Seducing Charlie Barker	Stella	
2012	Changing Hearts	Christina Riley	
2013	Gone Missing	Rene	
2013	A Remarkable Life	Tracy	
2014	Monkey in the Middle	Olive	
2015	Summer Forever	Sophie	
2015	Occupy Alice	Cindy Lowe	Short film
2016	Who's Driving Doug	Alison	
2016	Beyond Paradise	Elana	
2016	Search Engines	Kate	
2016	Those Left Behind	Shelly	
2017	Heartbeats	Michelle Andrews	
2018	Witness Unprotected	Sam	
2018	Abigail Falls	Anne	
2026	Love Song For My Texas Ranger		
2027	Spaceballs: The New One	Queen Vespa	Post-production

=== Television ===
Year	Title	Role	Notes
1983	Quarterback Princess	Kim Maida	Television film
1984	Family Ties	Rachel Miller	2 episodes
1985	Stone Pillow	Carrie Lang	Television film
1989	Nightmare Classics	Irene Marlowe	Episode: "The Eyes of the Panther"
1992	Prey of the Chameleon	Patricia / Elizabeth Burrows	Television film
1992–1996	Melrose Place	Jo Reynolds	112 episodes
1993	The Hidden Room	Elizabeth Mahern	Episode: "The Faithful Follower"
1994	Models Inc.	Jo Reynolds	Episode: "Pilot"
1995	Happily Ever After: Fairy Tales for Every Child	Cinderella (voice)	Episode: "Cinderella"
1995	Degree of Guilt	Teresa 'Terri' Peralta	Television film
1996	Pandora's Clock	Dr. Roni Sanders	Television film
1997	Johnny Bravo	Gabrielle (voice)	Episode: "My Fair Dork"
1997	Dead Man's Gun	Lillian / Tanya	Episode: "Black Widow"
1997	Loss of Faith	Claire Hainey	Television film
1997–1998	Spin City	Carrie	2 episodes
1998	Stories from My Childhood	Unknown	Episode: "Ivan and His Magic Pony"
1999	The Outer Limits	Juliette Kagan	Episode: "Essence of Life"
1999–2000	Batman Beyond	April; Lula (voice)	2 episodes
2000	Stark Raving Mad	Dr. Anne Russo	Episode: "Therapy"
2003	Law & Order: Special Victims Unit	Emma Dishell	Episode: "Abomination"
2003	Eve	Mrs. King	Episode: "Twas the Fight Before Christmas"
2003	Ghost Dog: A Detective Tail	Amanda Morton	Television film
2004–2005	American Dreams	Shelly Pierce	14 episodes
2005–2006	Beautiful People	Lynn Kerr	16 episodes
2006	Christmas Do-Over	Jill	Television film
2006	The Obsession	Deborah Matthews	Television film
2007	Nip/Tuck	Carly Summers	Episode: "Carly Summers"
2007	TED: The Future We Will Create	Herself / Host	Television film; also director and executive producer
2008	Novel Adventures	Laura French	8 episodes
2008–2009	Spaceballs: The Animated Series	Princess Vespa (voice)	12 episodes
2008–2012	One Tree Hill	Victoria Davis	40 episodes
2009–2010	Melrose Place	Jo Reynolds	Episodes: "Windsor" and "Santa Fe"
2010	A Family Thanksgiving	Claudia	Television film; also executive producer
2010	On Strike for Christmas	Joy Robertson	Television film
2013	Signed, Sealed, Delivered	Andrea Shmeckle	Television film
2015	Hindsight	Libby	Episode: "The Cranberries"
2016	When Duty Calls	Carol Lawton	Television film
2016	My Husband Is Missing	Ann Bradshaw	Television film
2017	The Wrong Babysitter	Susan	Television film
2018	A Christmas Arrangement	Blair Covington	Television film
2019	V.C. Andrews' Heaven	Nurse Broadfield	Episode: "Gates of Paradise"
2019	Christmas in Paris	Kate Fortune	Television film
2020	NCIS	Navy Commander Stacy Gordon	Episode: "Lonely Hearts"
2021	Fantasy Island	Margot	Episode: "The Big Five Oh"
2022	Dynasty	Sonya Jackson	2 episodes
2023	The Masked Singer	Herself / Clue Giver	Episode: "Masked Singer in Space"
2026	The Moof Milkers: A Live Staged Reading of Star Wars - The Force Awakens	General Leia Organa	

== Awards and nominations ==
Year	Award	Category	Work	Result
2008	LA Femme Film Festival	LA Femme Filmmaker Award: New Establishment Award	Herself	Won
2011	Environmental Leadership Awards	CLCV Environmental Leadership Award	Herself	Won
2016	Santa Fe Film Festival	Creative Spirit Award	Search Engines	Won
