= 35th Annie Awards =

US media awards ceremony held in 2008

- Date: February 8, 2008
- Site: Royce Hall; Los Angeles, California, U.S.
- Hosted by: Tom Kenny
- Organized by: ASIFA-Hollywood

Highlights
- Best Animated Feature: Ratatouille
- Best Direction: Brad Bird; Ratatouille
- Most awards: Ratatouille (9)
- Most nominations: Ratatouille (13)

The 35th Annual Annie Awards, honoring the best in animation for 2007, was held on February 8, 2008, at UCLA's Royce Hall. This was the first change of venue for the awards in nine years, being held at the Alex Theatre in Glendale, California, since 1998 until last year. Ratatouille was the biggest winner, taking nine awards.

== Winners and nominees ==
Nominations announced on December 3, 2007.

=== Awards ===
==== Production ====
Winners are listed first, highlighted in boldface, and indicated with a double dagger (‡).

**Best Animated Feature**: **Ratatouille – Pixar Animation Studios**‡; Bee Movie – DreamWorks Animation; Persepolis – Sony Pictures Classics; Surf's Up – Sony Pictures Animation; The Simpsons Movie – 20th Century Fox	**Best Home Entertainment Production**: **Futurama: Bender's Big Score – The Curiosity Company in association with 20th Century Fox Television**‡; Doctor Strange – MLG Productions
**Best Animated Short Subject**: **Your Friend the Rat – Pixar Animation Studios**‡; Everything Will Be OK – Bitter Films; How to Hook Up Your Home Theater – Walt Disney Feature Animation; "Mascot Prep" (Shorty McShorts' Shorts) – Walt Disney Television Animation; The Chestnut Tree – Picnic Pictures	**Best Animated Television Commercial**: **Escape Average for PowerShares – Acme Filmworks**‡; CVS Watering Can – Acme Filmworks; Homeowners (Esurance) – Wild Brain; Idaho Lottery: Twister – Acme Filmworks; Alaska (Oregon Lottery) – Laika/house
**Best Animated Television Production**: **Creature Comforts America – Aardman Animations**‡; Jane and the Dragon – Weta Productions Limited and Nelvana Limited; Moral Orel – ShadowMachine; "Robot Chicken: Star Wars" – ShadowMachine; Kim Possible – Walt Disney Television Animation	**Best Animated Television Production for Children**: **El Tigre – Nickelodeon**‡; Chowder – Cartoon Network Studios; Little Einsteins – Disney Channel; Peep and the Big Wide World – Discovery Kids; The Backyardigans – Nickelodeon
**Best Animated Video Game**: **Ratatouille – THQ, Inc.**‡; Avatar: The Last Airbender – The Burning Earth – THQ, Inc.; Bee Movie Game – Activision; Transformers: The Game – Blur Studios

==== Individual achievement ====
Winners are listed first, highlighted in boldface, and indicated with a double dagger (‡).

**Animated Effects**: **Deborah Carlson – Surf's Up**‡; Gary Bruins – Ratatouille; Ryan Laney – Spider-Man 3; James Mansfield – How to Hook Up Your Home Theater; Jon Reisch – Ratatouille	**Animation Production Artist**: **John Clark – Surf's Up**‡; Michael Isaak – Bee Movie; Hyun-min Lee – The Chestnut Tree; Natasha Liberman – "Creepie and the Candy Factory" (Growing Up Creepie); Jim Worthy – "Meet the Spidermonkeys" (My Gym Partner's a Monkey)
**Character Animation in a Television Production**: **Eric Towner – Robot Chicken**‡; Elizabeth Harvatine – "Nature" (Part 2) (Moral Orel); Monica Kennedy – El Tigre	**Character Animation in a Feature Production**: **Michal Makarewicz – Ratatouille**‡; Dave Hardin – Surf's Up; Alan Hawkins – Surf's Up
**Character Design in a Television Production**: **Jorge R. Gutierrez – "Fistful of Collars" (El Tigre)**‡	**Character Design in a Feature Production**: **Carter Goodrich – Ratatouille**‡; Sylvain Deboissy – Surf's Up
**Directing in a Television Production**: **Seth Green – "Robot Chicken: Star Wars"**‡; David Hartman – "Turtle's Need for Speed" (My Friends Tigger & Pooh); Raymie Muzquiz – "Gumfight at the S'Okay Corral" (Squirrel Boy); Howy Parkins – "The Emperor's New School Musical" (The Emperor's New School); Gary Trousdale – Shrek the Halls	**Directing in a Feature Production**: **Brad Bird – Ratatouille**‡; Ash Brannon and Chris Buck – Surf's Up; Chris Miller and Raman Hui – Shrek the Third; Vincent Paronnaud and Marjane Satrapi – Persepolis; David Silverman – The Simpsons Movie
**Music in a Television Production**: **Alf Clausen and Michael Price – "Yokel Chords" (The Simpsons)**‡; Evan Lurie, Robert Scull and Steven Bernstein – "International Super Spy" (The Backyardigans); Drew Neumann and Gregory Hinde – Billy & Mandy's Big Boogey Adventure; Shawn Patterson – "Yellow Pantera" (El Tigre); James L. Venable and Jennifer Kes Remington – "The Bloo Suerdude and the Magic Potato of Power!" (Foster's Home for Imaginary Friends)	**Music in a Feature Production**: **Michael Giacchino – Ratatouille**‡; Olivier Bernet – Persepolis; Danny Elfman, Rufus Wainwright and Rob Thomas – Meet the Robinsons; Rupert Gregson-Williams – Bee Movie; Amy Powers, Russ DeSalvo and Jeff Danna – Disney Princess Enchanted Tales
**Production Design in a Feature Production**: **Harley Jessup – Ratatouille**‡; Doug Chiang – Beowulf; Marcelo Vignali – Surf's Up	**Storyboarding in a Television Production**: **Steve Fonti – "No Chris Left Behind" (Family Guy)**‡; Ben Balistreri – "Torrent of Terror" (Danny Phantom); Aldin Baroza – "London Calling" (The Replacements); Dave Bennett – Tom and Jerry Tales; Roy Meurin – "Good Night to Pooh" (My Friends Tigger & Pooh)
**Storyboarding in a Feature Production**: **Ted Mathot – Ratatouille**‡; Don Hall – Meet the Robinsons; Denise Koyama – Surf's Up; Sean Song – TMNT; Nassos Vakalis – Bee Movie	**Voice Acting in a Television Production**: **Eartha Kitt – Yzma – "The Emperor's New School Musical" (The Emperor's New School)**‡; Scott Adsit – Clay Puppington – Moral Orel; Madison Davenport – Sophianna – Christmas Is Here Again; Tom Kenny – SpongeBob SquarePants – "Spy Buddies" (SpongeBob SquarePants); Eddie Murphy – Donkey – Shrek the Halls
**Voice Acting in a Feature Production**: **Ian Holm – Skinner – Ratatouille**‡; Janeane Garofalo – Colette Tatou – Ratatouille; Julie Kavner – Marge Simpson – The Simpsons Movie; Patton Oswalt – Remy – Ratatouille; Patrick Warburton – Ken – Bee Movie	**Writing in a Television Production**: **Ian Maxtone-Graham and Billy Kimball – "24 Minutes" (The Simpsons)**‡; C. H. Greenblatt and William Reiss – "Burple Nurples" (Chowder); Gene Grillo – "Cowman and Ratboy" (Back at the Barnyard); Christopher Painter – "I Only Have Eye For You" (Squirrel Boy); Tom Sheppard – "The Butt of the Jake" (My Gym Partner's a Monkey
**Writing in a Feature Production**: **Brad Bird – Ratatouille**‡; James L. Brooks, Matt Groening, Al Jean, Ian Maxtone-Graham, George Meyer, David Mirkin, Mike Reiss, Mike Scully, Matt Selman, John Swartzwelder and Jon Vitti – The Simpsons Movie; Don Rhymer, Ash Brannon, Chris Buck and Christopher Jenkins – Surf's Up; Marjane Satrapi and Vincent Paronnaud – Persepolis

=== Juried awards ===
- Winsor McCay Award — John Canemaker, Glen Keane and John Kricfalusi
- June Foray Award — Jerry Beck
- Ub Iwerks Award — Jonathan Gay, Gary Grossman and Robert Tatsumi – Creators of Adobe Flash.
- Special Achievement — Edwin R. Leonard – Promoting the use of Linux in animation studios and video game development.
- Certificate of Merit — Marcus Adams, Joseph Baptista, Steve Gattuso, Jon Reeves, Gemma Ross and Woodbury University

== Media with multiple nominations and awards ==
The following eighteen films and TV series received multiple nominations:

Nominations	Medium
13	Ratatouille
10	Surf's Up
5	Bee Movie
4	El Tigre
4	Persepolis
4	The Simpsons
3	Moral Orel
3	Robot Chicken
2	The Backyardigans
2	The Chestnut Tree
2	Chowder
2	The Emperor's New School
2	How to Hook Up Your Home Theater
2	Meet the Robinsons
2	My Friends Tigger & Pooh
2	My Gym Partner's a Monkey
2	Shrek the Halls
2	Squirrel Boy

The following five films and TV series received multiple awards:

Awards	Medium
9	Ratatouille
2	El Tigre
2	Robot Chicken
2	The Simpsons
2	Surf's Up
