= List of The Emperor's New School episodes =

This article following is an episode list for the Disney Channel animated series The Emperor's New School.

Disney's The Emperor's New School is a television series companion to the movies The Emperor's New Groove and Kronk's New Groove. This time, Kuzco must graduate school before he can claim the throne and become the official emperor. Besides passing all his classes, he has to keep thwarting attempts by the infamous Yzma and Kronk to stop him. Yzma is now disguised as the principal and Kronk is disguised as a student.

== Series overview ==
Season	Segments	Episodes	Originally released	
Season	Segments	Episodes	First released	Last released
1	33	21	January 27, 2006	November 11, 2006
2	57	31	June 23, 2007	November 20, 2008

== Episodes ==
=== Season 1 (2006) ===
No. overall	No. in season	Title	Directed by	Written by	Original release date	Prod. code
1	1	"Rabbit Face"	David Knott	Bobs Gannaway	January 27, 2006	101
Kuzco faces his first threat of losing his position as emperor when he struggles in P.E. and his teacher threatens to flunk him if he can't win a race with Kronk. However, Principal Amzy (who is actually Yzma) tells Kronk to turn Kuzco into a turtle so he has no chance of beating Kronk, but instead, Kronk gives Kuzco the wrong potion and he ends up as a rabbit.
2	2	"Squeakend at Bucky's" "Kuzco Fever"	David Knott	Kevin D. Campbell Bobs Gannaway	January 28, 2006	107
Squeakend at Bucky's: After failing his "squirrel speak" quiz, Kuzco is forced to get tutored by Bucky the Squirrel, whom he really dislikes. Kuzco Fever: Kuzco is getting sick of living without his emperor luxuries, so he pretends to be sick to tap into the royal funds. However, his lie is seen through and later falls into a real sickness caused by Yzma.
3	3	"Empress Malina" "The Adventures of Red-Eyed Tree Frog-Man"	Howy Parkins	Kevin D. Campbell Scott Peterson	February 3, 2006	102
Empress Malina: Kuzco is worried that Malina's zit will "throw off his groove" so he tries to make it better with Yzma's potion, but that makes Malina grow a toucan beak. The Adventures of Red-Eyed Tree Frog Man: Kuzco becomes Red-Eyed Tree Frog-Man after Yzma turns him into a Red-eyed tree frog and acts like a superhero.
4	4	"Hungry, Hungry Llama" "Only the Wrong Survive"	Howy Parkins	Kevin D. Campbell Mark Banker	February 10, 2006	106
Hungry, Hungry Llama: Yzma turns Kronk into a llama so he will eat Kuzco's homework in an attempt to make him fail class (because Kuzco has never actually done the homework and made ridiculous excuses not to get into trouble). Only the Wrong Survive: Kuzco, Malina, and Kronk must survive in the jungle for 24 hours for Mr Moleguaco's class.
5	5	"Cart Wash" "Battle of the Bots"	David Knott	Nina Bargiel & Jeremy Bargiel Kevin Seccia	February 17, 2006	103
Cart Wash: Kuzco must raise 100 Kuz-coins for charity by washing carts. Yzma turns him into an elephant to prevent him from being able to wash carts. Battle of the Bots: All students must invent something in order to graduate. To avoid work Kuzco accidentally activates Yzma's woodbot and then builds a rockbot to stop the woodbot.
6	6	"Girls Behaving Oddly"	Howy Parkins	Kevin Seccia	February 24, 2006	112
Malina is upset that her life is empty because she got kicked off the cheerleading squad, due to her A−. To try to join her and her new friends Kuzco and Kronk change themselves into girls. Guest star: Grey DeLisle as Moxie
7	7	"The Lost Kids" "The Big Fight"	Howy Parkins	Mark Seidenberg Scott Peterson	March 3, 2006	110
The Lost Kids: Kuzco babysits Pacha's kids while Pacha and Chicha go to the "Cure All Spa & Hot Springs" for their anniversary, but the kids forgot to give them their present, so they leave without telling Kuzco, and now he has to bring them back. This is made harder when Yzma transforms the children into monkeys. The Big Fight: Kuzco fights Kavo, the school bully at sunset because Kuzco has always been making fun of the way Kavo talks. Kronk tries to turn him into a gorilla to help him win but accidentally changes him into a cat. Right at the end of the fight, Kronk turns Kavo into a mouse. Guest star: Kevin Michael Richardson as Kavo
8	8	"Kuzclone"	David Knott	Bobs Gannaway	March 31, 2006	111
Kuzclone (Brad Bowllama) is born because of Yzma's cloning spray. The real Kuzco is kidnapped and the imposter Kuzco ruins his grades.
9	9	"Unfit to Print" "The Emperor's New Pet"	Howy Parkins	Mark Seidenberg	April 7, 2006	108
Unfit to Print: Kuzco becomes editor of the academy's news scroll, which makes Malina jealous and angry because Kuzco's lies are more interesting than her real stories. The Emperor's New Pet: Kuzco must take care of a kitten as his assignment. Unfortunately, Yzma turns the kitten into a jaguar.
10	10	"Peasant for a Day"	Howy Parkins	Mark Banker	April 21, 2006	104
Kuzco must learn about the life of a villager. Meanwhile, Kronk gets to be an emperor. Note: Included in this episode is the alarm clock (alarm sundial, in this case) tune "Kuzco Allegiance Day," set to the tune of The Ride of the Valkyries.
11	11	"Fortune Cookie Day" "Gold Fools"	David Knott	Glen Eichler Kevin Seccia	May 5, 2006	113
Fortune Cookie Day: Kuzco falls victim to fortune cookies. Gold Fools: When Kuzco's attempts to earn money for the cart cycle that he wants to buy fail miserably, he turns to an old legend about magical creatures that are supposed to hand over their gold to you if you catch them.
12	12	"The Mystery of Micchu Pachu"	David Knott	Ed Scharlach	May 12, 2006	105
Kuzco, Malina and his class visit the ruins of Micchu Pachu. Kuzco is scared but doesn't show it, he wants to go home but if he does he will fail, and thus won't become emperor. Things get worse for Kuzco and Malina when an anteater skeleton appears and begins to terrorize everyone. Guest star: Frank Welker as Creepy Little Old Man
13	13	"Oops, All Doodles" "Chipmunky Business"	Howy Parkins	Mark Seidenberg Kevin D. Campbell and Evan Gore	June 24, 2006	120
Oops, All Doodles: After a mask is stolen, Yzma wants to blame Kuzco for taking it. In order to find out who really did it, Kuzco, Malina, Kronk, Yzma, and Pacha all tell their versions of the story, via their own doodles. Chipmunky Business: For Kuzclub Week, everybody has to join a club for a week or they will fail. Kuzco joins the Jr. Chipmunks, thinking it will be an easy week. However, Yzma sends her nephews, Zim and Zam, to try to make sure Kuzco doesn't get a badge so he can't pass. Special Guest stars: Dylan and Cole Sprouse as Zim and Zam Note: "Oops, All Doodles" is the only episode where Kronk, Yzma, and Pacha draw doodles.
14	14	"Clash of the Families"	David Knott	John Matta & Ken Daly	July 1, 2006	109
It's the national celebration "Famaolimpics". Since Malina promised that she would clash dance with the winner, Kuzco switches families between Pacha's and Kronk's.
15	15	"The New Kid" "Officer Kronk"	Howy Parkins	Kevin D. Campbell and Brian Swenlin Mark Seidenberg	July 8, 2006	114
The New Kid: Ozker, a young emperor like Kuzco as well as his biggest fan, comes to the academy as a new student. However, Kuzco thinks Ozker is actually Yzma in disguise. Guest star: Corey Burton as Ozker ---: Officer Kronk: Kronk becomes a hall monitor, but Kuzco frames him and now makes up rules.
16	16	"Kronk Moves In"	David Knott and Howy Parkins	Mark Seidenberg	July 15, 2006	117
After Yzma fires Kronk, he moves into Pacha's house. The entire family warms up to Kronk, which makes Kuzco jealous. So he tries to get the family's attention back on him.
17	17	"Kuzcogarten" "Evil and Eviler"	Howy Parkins	Kevin Seccia Mark Banker	August 5, 2006	118
Kuzcogarten: After Yzma and Kronk find out that Kuzco never finished Kuzcogarten, the young emperor is sent back to finish it. As usual, Yzma tries to ruin his chances of passing by disguising as a Kuzcogarten student. Guest star: Chloë Grace Moretz as Furi Evil and Eviler: Yzma hires an emperor exterminator to get rid of Kuzco. Guest star: Tisha Terrasini Banker as Miss Ni
18	18	"The Bride of Kuzco"	David Knott	Ed Scharlach	August 12, 2006	115
Kuzco cancels his "date-date" with Malina because of his arranged marriage with princess Lalala, because if he marries her, he will instantaneously be emperor. Unfortunately, his bride is not as beautiful as she seems to be but when Lalala turns into a frog, the wedding must be canceled. Guest stars: Teresa Ganzel as Princess Lalala and Ellen Albertini Dow as Azma
19	19	"U.F.kuzcO, (Unidentified Flying Kuzco)" "Attack Sub"	Howy Parkins	Bobs Gannaway Michael Grodner	August 19, 2006	116
U.F.kuzcO: Kuzco thinks space people that are looking for him exist. Attack Sub: A mean substitute teacher Mr Nadaempa, takes over while Mr Moleguaco is on vacation. Guest star: John DiMaggio as Mr Nadaempa
20	20	"The Yzma That Stole Kuzcoween" "Monster Masquerade"	David Knott and Howy Parkins	Mark Seidenberg Kevin Seccia	October 14, 2006	119
The Yzma That Stole Kuzcoween: Yzma wants to get rid of Kuzcoween and call it Yzmaween. Monster Masquerade: Malina gets a letter from a secret admirer, causing Kuzco and Kronk to look for him.
21	21	"Yzmopolis"	David Knott and Howy Parkins	Kevin D. Campbell and Ed Scharlach	November 11, 2006	121
In a parody of It's a Wonderful Life, Kuzco wishes he'd never been emperor, and his wish changes everything where Yzma is the empress. Note: Yzma's attempt to destroy Pacha's hut and make it into Yzmatopia was just like Kuzco's attempt to do the same thing in The Emperor's New Groove, making it into Kuzcotopia. After the episode comes a short on "Bucky the Squirrel in Balloonatic." Bucky tries to cheer up his little sister with balloon sculptures.

=== Season 2 (2007–08) ===
No. overall	No. in season	Title	Original release date	Prod. code
22	1	"The Emperor's New Tuber" "Room for Improvement"	June 23, 2007	201
The Emperor's New Tuber: Malina enters a potato growing contest, but when everything fails she does the worst thing ever – cheating. (Note: First appearance of Yatta (Miley Cyrus).) Room for Improvement: Kuzco misses all of the room at the palace and is sick of sharing a room with Chaca and Tipo, so he puts them up for sale outside. Kronk comes by and offers to clean the house for them. However, this is a plan by Yzma as she wants Kronk to find Kuzco's emperor permit so that she can change it to make her empress. (Note: John Goodman's return debut as Pacha.)
23	2	"Cool Summer" "Prisoner of Kuzcoban"	June 30, 2007	203
Cool Summer: Kuzco goes to the beach with Pacha and Chicha but he fears that the two "old people" will ruin his coolness. Yzma uses a youth potion to make herself an attractive teenager to get near Kuzco and smack him with a hammer. Through a mistake, Chicha and Pacha turn into their teenage selves again. When the 18-again couple prove themselves neater than Kuzco, everything changes. Prisoner of Kuzcoban: (Note: The title is a pun on J.K.Rowling's Harry Potter and the Prisoner of Azkaban but the episode has no relation to that plot.) A man who Kuzco wrongfully imprisoned seven years earlier seeks revenge.
24	3	"Ramon's a Crowd" "Guakumentary"	July 7, 2007	204
Ramon's a Crowd: There's a new Spanish kid Ramon at the school who gets all the ladies' attention, and what's more – he replaces Kronk as Yzma's henchman. Guakumentary: Kuzco gets Guaka to do a documentary about him, in order to secure enough votes for a "Most Popular" Mosty Award. At the premiere, however, Kuzco lets it slip about how little regard he truly has for Guaka...who then gives Kuzco his comeuppance by submitting a very different -- though far more accurate -- cut of the film.
25	4	"Show Me the Monkey" "Demon Llama!"	July 21, 2007	205
Show Me the Monkey: (Note: The title is a reference to Veronica Mars's episode of the same name.) Kuzco claims he can climb Kuzco Academy in order to show up Ramon, intending to substitute a monkey. Demon Llama!: Kuzco must learn how to herd llamas. However, at the same time, Yzma tests her demon potion, which affects Pacha's llama's as well.
26	5	"Picture This!" "TV or Not TV"	August 4, 2007	202
Picture This!: Malina tries to destroy every yearbook because of her bad photo. TV or Not TV: When Kronk gets on TV, Kuzco gets jealous.
27	6	"Kuz-Cop" "How Now Sea Cow?"	September 2, 2007	206
Kuz-Cop: Kuzco gets the mall security guard fired, thus resulting in chaos in the Kuzco market. Guest star: Kevin McDonald as Officer Achamare How Now Sea Cow?: (Note: The title "How Now Sea Cow?" refers to the phrase "How Now, Brown Cow?".) For Kuzclub Week, Kuzco and Malina decide to help the Manatees but realize they have to take care of one of them.
28	7	"A Fair to Remember" "Working Girl"	October 15, 2007	207
A Fair to Remember: The Kuzcarnival's in town and Kuzco's planning a date with Malina but Ramon asked her out first. Working Girl: When there's bad service at Mudka's Meat Hut, Malina joins in. However, when Mudka Jr. arrives, Yatta gets fired.
29	8	"Curse of the Moon Beast" "Aww, Nuts!"	October 22, 2007	215
Curse of the Moon Beast: It's Prank Day, and Kuzco (unlike Kronk) is sure he is the next victim of the moon beast. Aww, Nuts!: Kuzco and Kronk get turned into squirrels, only to be hunted down by the villagers for what Kuzco did to the Nut Festival.
30	9	"The Emperor's New School Spirit" "Card Wars"	November 5, 2007	210
The Emperor's New School Spirit: When Victor, the famous llama mascot goes missing Kuzco disguises himself as Victor but has to help Yzma get revenge on her old school friends. Guest starring: Grey DeLisle as Card Wars: Everyone's into a new card game and when Kuzco trades Kronk his best card he plans to get it back from him.
31	10	"Mudka's Secret Recipe" "The Emperor's New Home School"	November 19, 2007	209
Mudka's Secret Recipe: Yzma's latest scheme to rule the empire includes turning Kuzco into a puma. She plans to slip the puma potion into Kuzco's Meat Mug since that is the only thing he will eat. However, Kronk refuses to tamper with the recipe, so Yzma breaks into Mudka's and steals the recipe. When Kronk finds out, he and Kuzco head for Major Mudka's hut to get back the secret recipe. At the same time, Kronk and Yatta try to get Kuzco to eat healthier. Guest stars: Estelle Harris as Mrs. Mudka and Fred Willard as Major Mudka/Mudka, Sr. The Emperor's New Home School: Kuzco doesn't want to be at the Academy, so he decides to get homeschooled with Chicha.
32	11	"The Emperor's New School Musical"	December 3, 2007	212
Kuzco and Malina make a school musical to raise money to save Kuzco Academy and Kuzco wants the starring role. But when the famous pop idol, Dirk Brock, arrives, he gets jealous. Guest star: Joey Lawrence as Dirk Brock Note: Kuzco and Malina share their first kiss on-screen. Although they argue over whether it was real or acting, during the credits.
33	12	"A Giftmas Story"	December 10, 2007	217
Kuzco wants to get off Papa Santos's naughty list. But after Yzma freezes one of Papa Santos' reindeers, Kuzco turns himself into a llama and guides the sleigh thus saving Giftmas.
34	13	"No Man Is an Island" "Vincent Van Guaka"	January 14, 2008	211
No Man Is an Island: Yzma's latest scheme to get rid of Kuzco is a little more simplistic than usual. She decides to just put him in a box and ship him away. When Kronk sets a trap for Kuzco, he also ends up capturing Malina and shipping them to a deserted island. While Yzma decides to begin her palace remodeling, Kronk heads to the island to save Malina, and maybe Kuzco. In order to stop Kronk from rescuing Kuzco, Yzma heads to the island. Meanwhile, Malina ends up becoming an idol for the monkeys, who do anything she wants. Kuzco then gets them to make him their king, but the two end up being sacrifices to their real idol – a giant monkey. Vincent Van Guaka: Kuzco invites Malina, Kronk, Yatta, and Guaca over to play games, where they discover Guaka’s “fear” of drawing. His father wants him to be an artist, so he entered him in the art competition to be held the next day. Kuzco hates seeing Guaka so depressed (since he keeps spilling his drinks), so he sneaks into Yzma’s lab to find a painting potion. When it turns out that Yzma used the last one, Kuzco must make another one. When he goes to test it at the art fair, his pterodactyl drawing comes to life and takes Guaka’s father. Now it is up to Guaka to save his dad.
35	14	"Air Kuzco" "Kronkenitza"	January 28, 2008	213
Air Kuzco: Kuzco is tired of Kronk getting all the attention so he decides to join the Inca-ball team (related to basketball) but finds out he's no good. Kronkenitza: (Note: The title of the episode is a reference to Chichen Itza, the ancient Mayan city.) After learning he's from a place called Kronkenitza and being teased by Kuzco, Kronk moves to the place where everybody looks like him.
36	15	"Come Fly with Me" "Project Poncho"	February 4, 2008	216
Come Fly with Me: (Note: The title is a reference to the song Come Fly with Me.) Malina invites everyone to the Bloom Ball for her birthday, and Kuzco ruins everything. He gets turned into a fly and after turning back he uses Kronk's present, a time watch, to fix everything. Project Poncho: (Note: The title "Project Poncho" is an allusion to the original fairy tale, "The Emperor's New Clothes" because Yzma is fooled into believing she is wearing a poncho when she really isn't.) The talent-challenged Kuzco steals Guaka's poncho-design, in order to win a vacation from a fashion show inspired by Project Runway. Meanwhile, two silkworms get revenge on Yzma for stiffing them after she makes them create a poncho so that she can enter the show.
37	16	"Citizen Kronk" "The Pajama Llama Dilemma"	March 3, 2008	214
Citizen Kronk: Malina holds an election for vice president. Kuzco drinks a potion to look like Kronk and ruin his reputation. The Pajama Llama Dilemma: After finding a "Pajama Pass" in a comic scroll -- good for a picnic with Pajama Llama, Kronk's favorite superhero -- Kuzco makes Kronk serve as his butler in return for the Pass. Actually, Kuzco has no intention of ever giving Kronk the Pass...which has already expired. Then Kuzco's guilt triggers nightmares which prevent him from sleeping, so he arranges a picnic with Pajama Llama -- in return for a "job" at the yogurt shop run by the comic scroll artist who created Pajama Llama.
38	17	"Yzma Be Gone" "Last Ditch Effort"	March 24, 2008	218
Yzma Be Gone: Kronk tells Kuzco that he should stand up for himself with Yzma, so he and Guaka come up with a plan to get rid of her. Last Ditch Effort: Kuzco has been missing from school for the last 10 days. Guaka and Malina have to find Kuzco, while avoiding Kronk and Yzma, and get to school before the final bell or Yzma will be empress and Kuzco will be expelled.
39	18	"The Good, the Bad and the Kronk" "Mudka's #13"	April 7, 2008	219
The Good, the Bad and the Kronk: When Yzma gives Kronk the assignment of disintegrating Kuzco, Kronk consults his shoulder angel and devil. However, the two of them get into another fight and Kronk tells them to go away. With those two gone, Kronk can no longer make decisions. Yzma then captures his shoulder angel in a cage and gives the shoulder devil back to Kronk. This causes Kronk to agree with everything the devil says, which causes him to try and disintegrate Kuzco. Mudka's #13: While lost in a storm, Kuzco, Kronk, Malina, and Guaka end up lost in the woods and wind up at Mudka's #13, a supposed cursed restaurant. They decide to stay there until the rain stops, against Kuzco's will. However, soon the secret of the restaurant is revealed when Kuzco wanders into unknown parts of the building. Note: "Mudka's #13" made references to 4 episodes of The Twilight Zone.
40	19	"Auction Action" "The Astonishing Kuzco-Man"	April 21, 2008	220
Auction Action: A charity bachelor auction is being held to raise money for charity, and Kuzco, Kronk, and Guaca will all be in it. When Kuzco insults Malina, she bids for Kronk instead to make him jealous. Kuzco then convinces Yata to bid for him to make Malina jealous. Then the four just happen to end up at the same restaurant for their dates, which turns the jealousy fest into an all-out battle. The Astonishing Kuzco-Man: After getting hit by Yzma's ray-gun, Kuzco gets superpowers which promptly go to his head. Yzma then uses the ray on herself to acquire similar powers with which to destroy Kuzco...who, to protect himself, rallies his classmates to form a Mighty Morphin Power Rangers-type group called the Kuzconian Super-Amigos. Note: In "Auction Action" Malina accidentally slips to Kuzco that she likes him.
41	20	"Guaka Rules"	May 5, 2008	221
After going on a field trip Mr Moleguaco finds out that Guaka's the rightful emperor. Kuzco and Malina decide to find a chalice that will make Kuzco emperor again. Meanwhile, Kronk and Yzma decide to destroy Guaka like they tried to destroy Kuzco in the movie.
42	21	"Malina's Big Break" "Hotel Kuzco"	May 22, 2008	222
Malina's Big Break: Malina is stressed about an interview with Incan Teen so she tries to pass Kuzco and Kronk's stress test. Guest star: John O'Hurley as the Editor Hotel Kuzco: Kuzco fakes a termite infection in Pacha's hut to get permission to live in the palace. Unfortunately, Pacha's family and later the whole village move into the now overcrowded palace and Kuzco has to handle all his guests. In the meantime, Yzma uses Kuzco's presence in the palace to try and destroy him and sets up several traps.
43	22	"Father O' Mine" "Everyone Loves Kuzco"	June 12, 2008	208
Father O' Mine: A man imposes as Kuzco's father. Everyone Loves Kuzco: Yzma makes a turkey and puts a cutie potion in it, so when Kuzco eats it the girls (and everything else) can't resist him.
44	23	"Puff Piece" "Take My Advice"	July 10, 2008	223
Puff Piece: Kuzco and his classmates are organized into pairs, then assigned to start and run their own businesses. Kuzco welcomes Kronk as a partner, and they open their own spinach puff-stand. Kuzco selfishly makes Kronk do all the work while pocketing the money...which he uses to open a greasy spoon called the Casa De Puff, where spinach puffs are made on an assembly line complete with a microwave oven. Soon, Kronk goes his own way and Kuzco's other employees -- a bunch of monkeys! -- quit, leaving Kuzco to run the eatery by himself; this soon leaves the Casa De Puff empty and in debt. Take My Advice: After Yzma fails her job review for the emperor's advisor, she gets replaced by a nicer woman named Obssesia. Guest star: Edie McClurg as Obsessia
45	24	"Yzbot" "The Puma Whisperer"	July 31, 2008	224
Yzbot: Yzma replaces herself with a robot of herself while she is away, but Kuzco and Kronk learn that it's a destruction machine. The Puma Whisperer: (Note: The title is a pun on The Horse Whisperer.) When Kuzco is attacked by pumas, Pacha saves him, and Kuzco thinks it is because of his amazing dodging skills. When he brags about it at school, Guaka arranges a puma wrestling match for him.
46	25	"Kronk the Magnificent" "Kamp Kuzco"	August 21, 2008	228
Kronk the Magnificent: Yzma's plan to wipe Kuzco out of the Royal Records backfires when Kronk replaces Kuzco on the records after rescuing the Royal Record Keeper. To repeal this change Kuzco and Yzma team up until the former Emperor-to-be recognizes his chance and turns against her. Kamp Kuzco: Malina and Kuzco attend Kamp Kuzco as tutors for a group of Junior Chipmunks. Soon Kuzco's statements about 'male advantage' lead the tutors to set up a race between the girls and the boys of the group. Through an attempt to ensure the victory of his boys, Kuzco gets himself and the girls lost in the jungle. So now Malina and Kronk have to rescue them and even Yzma uses this opportunity for a further attack on Kuzco.
47	26	"Groove Remover" "Overachiever's Club"	September 11, 2008	229
Groove Remover: Yzma gives Kuzco a potion that will immediately cause him to possess the flaws of other people that he makes fun of. Overachiever's Club: Kuzco is placed in the overachiever's club after getting in trouble, but he turns the club from using the money that they raise for charity to buy stuff for themselves. Yzma disguises herself as a bad influence in order to get Kuzco dropped out of school.
48	27	"The Emperor's New Show" "Too Many Malinas"	September 18, 2008	226
The Emperor's New Show: Kuzco sits down to read fan letters and finds one saying he should change his show. He does but receives yet another letter. It turns out it is Yzma trying to use the new shows as a method to destroy Kuzco. Too Many Malinas: When Malina won't pay attention to him, Kuzco uses Yzma's new machine to separate all of her personalities. He then begins to date "Smoochy Malina". However, when she becomes too clingy he dumps her. This causes all of the Malinas to turn on him and now he and Kronk must find a way to turn them all back into one Malina.
49	28	"Faking the Grade" "Eco Kuzco"	October 2, 2008	225
Faking the Grade: Kuzco gets straight A's on his report card, while Chaca gets all Ds. Yzma uses her flip-or-snaper potions to try turning them all into Fs. Eco Kuzco: When Yzma dumps her old potions into the river, most of the village people get turned into random animals after drinking the village water.
50	29	"Kuzcokazooza" "Kuzco's Little Secret"	October 23, 2008	230
Kuzcokazooza: Kuzco becomes a rockstar, but he can't sing with Kuzco fans. Kuzco's Little Secret: Kuzco gets a pet chinchilla, but Chicha doesn't want any pets in the house, so he tries to hide it. Meanwhile, Malina admits she likes Kuzco but she thinks that he has a girlfriend and Kronk tries to turn Kuzco into a blue parrot.
51	30	"Cornivale"	November 6, 2008	227
It is time for the annual Cornivale celebration and Kuzco wants to avoid it. He fakes being sick and then decides to head to the beach for the weekend. However, his cab driver annoys him constantly and ends up getting them stranded in the forest and robbed. However, talking with the cab driver might be just what he needs to realize what is really important. Meanwhile, Yzma disguises herself and joins Pacha's family for Cornivale so that she can turn Kuzco into an ear of corn so that Pacha will eat him. Guest star: Harland Williams as Cabbie
52	31	"Graduation Groove"	November 20, 2008	231
Graduation day is finally here! But after living as a peasant for so long and learning to enjoy the simpler things in life, Kuzco isn't sure if he actually wants to be the emperor anymore. Meanwhile, Yzma has one last plan to destroy Kuzco and convinces him to drink an everlasting chicken potion in order to avoid being emperor. Note: This episode is the series finale.
