= Stay Forever =

Stay Forever may refer to:

- "Stay Forever" (Hal Ketchum song)
- "Stay Forever" (Platin song)
- "Stay Forever", a song by Delain from April Rain
- "Stay Forever", single by Joey Lawrence from Joey Lawrence (1993)
- "Stay Forever", single by Ween from White Pepper (2000)
- "Stay Forever", song by Proud Mary (2001)
