= List of The Emperor's New Groove characters =

The main characters in The Emperor's New Groove. From left to right: Yzma, Kronk, Kuzco (in llama form), and Pacha.

The following are fictional characters from Disney's 2000 animated film The Emperor's New Groove, its direct-to-video sequel Kronk's New Groove, and the spin-off television series The Emperor's New School.

== Kuzco ==
Kuzco (/ˈkuːskoʊ/ KOO-skoh; voiced primarily by David Spade; J. P. Manoux in spinoff media) is the 18-year-old emperor of the Incas. His name is a reference to the ancient city Cusco.

Kuzco is initially portrayed as an arrogant, callous and spoiled narcissist, but has a sense of charm and style. In The Emperor's New Groove, Kuzco is turned into a llama by Yzma, who intends to poison him to claim the throne for herself. He is presumed dead and lost in the jungle. Kuzco teams up with Pacha, a llama herder, who helps Kuzco turn back into a human again, regaining his dignity and his throne.

Kuzco has occasionally appeared in Adventureland at Disney theme parks. He also featured in the television series House of Mouse and its direct-to-video film adaptation, Mickey's Magical Christmas.

== Pacha ==
Pacha (/ˈpɑːtʃə/ PAH-chə; voiced primarily by John Goodman; Fred Tatasciore in the first season of The Emperor's New School) is a farmer residing in the countryside of the Incas. He was a character added during the production process that completely revamped the story. The original role to assist emperor-turned-llama Kuzco was to be female, and a potential love interest for the discourteous teen. The major overhaul of story made the film a buddy film, with Pacha and Kuzco having to work through the adventure together. His name is possibly a reference to Incan emperor Pachacuti and means "earth" in Quechua.

Pacha is a friendly peasant and family man, and a subject in Kuzco's kingdom. His courage, reliability, and value of both friendship and family helps Kuzco change into a genial and mature young man. Pacha is married to Chicha, who is pregnant with Yupi when first seen. During the time of the first film, they have two children: their daughter, Chaca, and their younger son Tipo. Yupi is born during the film's events and appears in spin-off material.

== Yzma ==
Yzma (/ˈiːzmə/ EE-zmə; voiced initially by Eartha Kitt) is Kuzco's primary parental guardian and advisor, and the main antagonist of the franchise. She is a conniving and power-hungry woman who wields potions that enable her to transform others into animals and continues to pursue vengeance against Kuzco while he grows into a wiser ruler. Yzma is cruel, but comically eccentric, often calling herself beautiful even though all other characters in the series consider her appearance "scary beyond all reason". She is intelligent and comes up with grandiose plans and schemes with a set objective in mind, but fails to pay attention to the minor details of it. More often than not, such neglect causes the scheme to backfire on her.

In the first film, Yzma formulates a complicated plan to kill Kuzco before deciding to simply poison him. The concept of her formulating a nonsensical plan before settling on an easier-to-pull-off idea (always a potion) would later be used as a running gag in The Emperor's New School.

In the television series House of Mouse, Yzma makes a brief cameo appearance in the episode "Pluto vs. Figaro".

Yzma was one of the villains in the show Villains Tonight! for Disney Cruise Line's Disney Magic and Disney Dream.

In the Descendants franchise, she has a daughter named Yzla who appears in the Isle of the Lost novel series. In the animated short series Descendants: Wicked World, she has a son named Zevon (voiced by Bradley Steven Perry), who acts as the main antagonist in the series' second season.

== Kronk ==
Kronk Pepikrankenitz (voiced by Patrick Warburton) is the muscular and slow-witted henchman of Yzma. He primarily serves as comic relief. Whenever he faces a moral dilemma, smaller versions of Kronk, his shoulder angel and devil, appear, but they usually fight one another instead of helping him. He is revealed to be a great cook, who can make such things as spinach puffs and fondue, and also has a secret recipe for foie gras. He also knows a variety of recipes and kitchen slang, as revealed in first film when he takes over for the chef. He is capable of incredible superhuman athletics, such as running from a school to his house and back in mere seconds, and climbing a mountain (while having a seat tied to his body with Yzma riding atop).

Kronk stars in the spinoff film Kronk's New Groove, where he is the head chef and owner of the restaurant Mudka's. His love interest, Miss Birdwell, and his father, Papi (voiced by John Mahoney), are introduced.

In The Emperor's New School, Kronk plays the role of Yzma's sidekick although he also has a friendly relationship with Kuzco, sometimes ending up helping him, being also his classmate at Kuzco Academy. As a running gag, he can never remember that Principal Amzy is really Yzma. Another running gag revolves around Kronk attempting to activate access to the secret lab, as originated from the original film with the secret lab's access procedure: more often than not, he constantly pulls the wrong one, and as a result, Yzma constantly gets booby-trapped before fixing the error. At the series' finale, Kuzco appoints Kronk as his new advisor, while Yzma is made Kronk's assistant.

== Other characters introduced in the films ==
Introduced in The Emperor's New Groove

- Pacha's family, which includes:
  - Chicha (voiced by Wendie Malick) is Pacha's wife. Throughout most of the first film, she is heavily pregnant with her third child, Yupi, who is born before the final scene. In Kronk's New Groove, Kronk asks her to pretend to be his wife, as he promised his father he would marry her. In The Emperor's New School, she often serves as a mother figure to Kuzco.
  - Chaca and Tipo (voiced by Kellyann Elso and Eli Russell Linnetz, and Michaela Jill Murphy and Shane Baumel in later appearances) are Pacha and Chicha's children, who constantly try to one-up each other and compete for their father's attentions. In Kronk's New Groove, they join Kronk's Junior Chipmunks at Camp Chippamunka.
  - Yupi is Pacha and Chicha's baby. He is born before at the end of the first film. In Kronk's New Groove, when Chaca introduces him to Papi she mentions for the first time his name and current age, mentioning that he is half a year old.
- Matta (voiced by Patti Deutsch) is a waitress at Mudka's Meat Hut. She also works as a lunchlady at Kuzco Academy. She is Shepardic Jewish.
- Rudy (voiced by John Fiedler, later Travis Oates) is an old man who first appears accidentally interrupting Kuzco's "groove", for which he is thrown out a window. In the series, he is a janitor at Kuzco Academy.
- Bucky (voiced by Bob Bergen) is a squirrel who later befriends Kronk and becomes his aide in teaching squirrel talk.
- Topo and Ipi (voiced by Jeff Bennett) are two old men who make minor appearances in The Emperor's New Groove. They have a more relevant role in Kronk's New Groove as part of the residents from the old folks' home who are tricked by Yzma. They are recurring characters in The Emperor's New School.
- The Royal Recordkeeper (voiced by Joe Whyte in The Emperor's New Groove, Rip Taylor in The Emperor's New School) appear in The Emperor's New Groove as the one in charge of finding a bride for Kuzco. In The Emperor's New School he appears as a recurring character, reminding Kuzco of the rules in order to become emperor. The character also makes a cameo appearance in the House of Mouse episode "Pluto vs. Figaro".
- Delivery Man (voiced variously by Jeff Bennett, Fred Tatasciore, and Brian Cummings) is an incompetent delivery man.
- Chester is Yzma and Kronk's pet crocodile.
- The Bug and the Monkey appear briefly in The Emperor's New Groove, at one point showing a wide view of the waterfall Kuzco was going to fall from before being caught by Kronk, showing the bug on a branch, and at that moment the monkey (a New World monkey) appears, who eats the bug. Similar scenes with them appear as a recurring gag in The Emperor's New School.

Introduced in Kronk's New Groove

- Miss Birdwell (voiced by Tracey Ullman) is a camp counselor who serves as Kronk's love interest in Kronk's New Groove.
- Papi (voiced by John Mahoney, Jeff Bennett in The Emperor's New School) is Kronk's father. He always wanted his son Kronk to live a successful life, and always disapproved of his dreams of cooking and talking to animals. Eventually, Papi learned to accept Kronk just the way he is.
- Hildy (voiced by April Winchell) is an old woman and friend of Kronk.
- Marge and Tina (voiced by April Winchell) are two secretaries who Kronk hires when he makes a fortune.

== Introduced in The Emperor's New School ==
=== Malina ===
Malina (voiced by Jessica DiCicco) is a cheerleader and the school council president who Kuzco has a crush on. She is a straight-A+ student and is driven to excel almost to the point of having a nervous breakdown if she does not do everything to her ability. In the final episode of the series, she goes on a date with Kuzco after he is made emperor and becomes his girlfriend.

=== Recurring characters ===
- Flaco Moleguaco (voiced by Curtis Armstrong) is a teacher at Kuzco Academy. He hates Kuzco's smart-aleck attitude and threatens to fail him quite often.
- Coach Sweaty (voiced by Candi Milo) is a coach at Kuzco Academy.
- Yatta (voiced by Miley Cyrus) is a southern belle student in Kuzco Academy and a waitress at Mudka's Meat Hut.
- Ramon (voiced by Rene Mujica) is an athletic student at Kuzco Academy. Malina (and some of the other girls) have a crush on him, which causes Kuzco to greatly dislike him.
- Mr. Purutu (voiced by Ben Stein) is a counselor at Kuzco Academy who loves wind chimes.
- Moxie (voiced by Grey DeLisle) is a punk-looking student at Kuzco Academy. While she's perceived to be a "bad" girl at first, its later revealed that she's secretly a straight-A student like Malina.
- Urkon (voiced by Mark Schiff) is a village leader and the head of the Familympics.
- Curi, Cuxi, and Cuca (both voiced by Courtney Peldon) are cheerleaders at Kuzco Academy.
- Guaka (voiced by Justin Cowden) is a student at Kuzco Academy who looks up to Kuzco. His catchphrase is "Kuzco rules!". Later in the series it's revealed that he already graduated, he prefers to stay in school to be close to Kuzco.
- Yu and Tu (voiced by Gabriel Iglesias) are twin students at Kuzco Academy.
- Kavo (voiced by Kevin Michael Richardson) is a student at Kuzco Academy who appears to be a bully due to his deep voice and mannerisms. Kuzco constantly makes fun of him because of the way he talks.

=== Minor characters ===
- Homework (voiced by Frank Welker) appears in "The Emperor's New Pet". He is a cat who Kuzco is assigned to care for to learn responsibility. Homework is transformed into a jaguar by Yzma and has his feelings hurt because of what Kuzco said. Homework runs away heartbroken, but has a change of heart and saves Kuzco from a pack of actual jaguars. Homework is changed back to a kitten at the end of the episode.
- The Creepy Little Old Man (voiced by Frank Welker) appears in "The Mystery of Micchu Pachu". He is an old man who tells Kuzco of the legend of Micchu Pachu.
- Security Cam (voiced by Jeff Bennett) appears in "Oops, All Doodles". He is a security guard at Kuzco Academy.
- Zim (voiced by Dylan Sprouse) and Zam (voiced by Cole Sprouse) appear in "Chipmunky Business". They are Yzma's great-nephews.
- Krank Pepikrankenitz (voiced by Dante Basco) appears in "Clash of the Families". He is Kronk's brother.
- Mr. Sneaks appears in "Clash of the Families". He is Kronk's family pet cat.
- Ozker (voiced by Corey Burton) appears in "The New Kid". He is a varsity decathlon champion.
- Furi (voiced by Chloë Grace Moretz) appears in "Kuzcogarten". She is a student at Kuzcogarten and Tipo's friend.
- Miss Ni (voiced by Tisha Terrasini Banker) appears in "Evil and Eviler". She is an exterminator who Yzma hires to get rid of Kuzco.
- Cyro the Sneaky (voiced by Kevin Michael Richardson) appears in "Evil and Eviler". He is a notorious villain.
- Imatcha (voiced by Michael Gough) appears in "The Bride of Kuzco". He is Kuzco's matchmaker, who went to find Kuzco a perfect bride when he was born.
- Lalala (voiced by Teresa Ganzel) appears in "The Bride of Kuzco". She is a princess who Imatcha attempts to force Kuzco into marrying.
- Azma (voiced by Ellen Albertini Dow) appears in "The Bride of Kuzco". She is Yzma's 119-year-old mother.
- Mr. Nadaempa (voiced by John DiMaggio) appears in "Attack Sub". He is a substitute teacher and Moleguaco's cousin.
- Delivery Clown (voiced by Mark Schiff) appears in "Monster Masquerade". He is a mailman at Kuzco Academy.
- Dirk Brock (voiced by Joey Lawrence) appears in "Emperor's New Musical". He is a rockstar who is hired to raise money for Kuzco Academy.
- Fuzzico appears in "Kuzco's Little Secret". It is a chinchilla who Kuzco temporarily adopts before returning it to the wild.
