= Nothin' My Love Can't Fix =

1993 single by Joey Lawrence

Single by Joey Lawrence

from the album Joey Lawrence
- Released: February 15, 1993
- Studio: Platinum Island (New York); Entourage (North Hollywood)
- Length: 3:59
- Label: Impact; EMI
- Songwriters: Joey Lawrence; Alexandra Forbes; Eric Beall
- Producers: Steve Barri; Alexandra Forbes; Eric Beall; Tony Peluso

Joey Lawrence singles chronology
"Nothin' My Love Can't Fix" (1993)	"I Can't Help Myself" (1993)

"Nothin' My Love Can't Fix" is a song by American actor and singer Joey Lawrence, released on February 15, 1993, by MCA Records subsidiary Impact Records as the first single from his self-titled debut album (1993). Written by Lawrence, Alexandra Forbes and Eric Beall and produced by Forbes, Beall, Steve Barri and Tony Peluso, "Nothin' My Love Can't Fix" is Lawrence's most successful single, peaking at numbers 12 and 19 on the US Cash Box Top 100 and Billboard Hot 100 charts, and number 10 on the Billboard Top 40/Mainstream chart. It also reached number 13 in the United Kingdom, number 22 in Ireland, number 50 in Canada, and number 68 in Australia.

== Background ==
"Nothin' My Love Can't Fix" was written by Joey Lawrence, Alexandra Forbes, and Eric Beall. The song was written when Lawrence was approximately fifteen years old.

== Composition ==
According to the sheet music published at Musicnotes.com by Alfred Publishing, the song is written in the key of F major and is set in time signature of common time with a tempo of 108 beats per minute. Lawrence's vocal range spans three octaves, from F_{3} to F♯_{6}.

== Chart performance ==
In the United States, "Nothin' My Love Can't Fix" debuted at number 68 on the Billboard Hot 100 for the issue dated March 6, 1993. The song spent 20 weeks on the chart, reaching its peak position of number 19 for the issue dated May 8, 1993. On the 1993 year-end chart, the song achieved a position of number 92. It also peaked at number 12 on the Cash Box Top 100 in the same period.

== Music video ==
The music video for "Nothin' My Love Can't Fix" premiered on February 15, 1993, during an episode of Blossom. Prior to its broadcast, the video was promoted through advertisements on MTV and NBC. The music video received heavy airplay on many outlets, including MTV, and Lawrence was invited to perform on MTV Spring Break, The Arsenio Hall Show, and Top of the Pops.

== Track listings and formats ==
- 7-inch single
1. "Nothin' My Love Can't Fix" – 3:59
2. "Nothin' My Love Can't Fix" (D. Abraham Slam Mix) – 4:00
- 12-inch and CD single
1. "Nothin' My Love Can't Fix" – 3:59
2. "Nothin' My Love Can't Fix" (D. Abraham Slam Mix) – 4:00
3. "Nothin' My Love Can't Fix" (D. Abraham Alternate Extended Mix) – 5:13
- Cassette single 1
1. "Nothin' My Love Can't Fix" – 3:59
2. "Intro" – 0:13
3. "I Can't Help Myself" (excerpt) – 1:27
4. "Stay Forever" (excerpt) – 1:47
5. "Night by Night" (excerpt) – 1:50
- Cassette single 2
1. "Nothin' My Love Can't Fix" – 3:59
2. "Nothin' My Love Can't Fix" (D. Abraham Alternate Slam Mix) – 4:24
3. "Nothin' My Love Can't Fix" (D. Abraham Slam Mix) – 4:00
4. "Nothin' My Love Can't Fix" (D. Abraham Alternate Extended Mix) – 5:13
- US and UK 7-inch single
1. "Nothin' My Love Can't Fix" – 3:59
2. "Nothin' My Love Can't Fix" (D. Abraham Alternate Slam Mix) – 4:24
- Australian CD single
1. "Nothin' My Love Can't Fix" – 3:59
2. "Nothin' My Love Can't Fix" (D. Abraham Alternate Extended Mix) – 5:13

== Personnel ==
Personnel are adapted from the Joey Lawrence album liner notes.

- Joey Lawrence – vocals, writing
- Steve Barri – production
- Alexandra Forbes – production, writing
- Eric Beall – production, writing
- Tony Peluso – production, vocal recording, mixing
- Steve Skinner – keyboards, drum programming
- Fred Tenny – recording
- Axel Niehaus – assistant recording engineer
- Fred Kelly – assistant mixing engineer
- Julie Barri – production assistance
- Steve Hall – mastering

== Charts ==
=== Weekly charts ===
Chart (1993–1994)	Peak position
Australia (ARIA)	68
Canada Top Singles (RPM)	50
Europe (Eurochart Hot 100)	39
Ireland (IRMA)	22
UK Singles (Official Charts)	13
US Billboard Hot 100	19
US Top 40/Mainstream (Billboard)	10
US Top 40/Rhythm-Crossover (Billboard)	34
US Cash Box Top 100	12

=== Year-end charts ===
Chart (1993)	Position
US Billboard Hot 100	92

== Release history ==
Region	Date	Format(s)	Label(s)	Ref.
United States	February 15, 1993	7-inch vinyl; 12-inch vinyl; cassette	Impact	
United Kingdom	June 14, 1993	7-inch vinyl; CD; cassette	EMI	
Australia	July 26, 1993	CD; cassette	Impact; EMI	
Australia	January 24, 1994	CD with poster	Impact; EMI	

== In popular culture ==
"Nothin' My Love Can't Fix" was used as the end-title theme for the 1993 film Cop and a Half.
