= Soulmates (Joey Lawrence album) =

Studio album by Joey Lawrence
- Released: 16 September 1997
- Studio: Pacifique Studios (North Hollywood, California); O'Henry Sound Studios (Burbank, California)
- Genre: Pop; dance-pop
- Length: 41:39
- Label: Curb
- Producer: Steve Barri; Steve Goldstein; Joey Lawrence

Joey Lawrence chronology
Joey Lawrence (1993)	Soulmates (1997)	Imagine (2017)

Professional ratings
Review scores
Source	Rating
AllMusic	2/5 stars

Soulmates is the second album from American singer and actor Joey Lawrence. It was released in 1997 on Curb Records. Unlike his debut album, Joey Lawrence, he featured in the production and co-wrote nine of the songs (the tenth track was self-penned).

== Track listing ==
1. "Never Gonna Change My Mind" (Joey Lawrence, Steve Real) - 4:29
2. "Ven Ven Conmigo" (Translation: Come, Come With Me) (Lawrence, Real) - 4:25
3. "Soulmates" (Lawrence, Steve Le Gassick, Michael Price) - 4:16
4. "Timeless" (Lawrence, Le Gassick, Price, Real) - 4:47
5. "Me & You" (Lawrence) - 4:42
6. "Cypress Park (All Good People)" (Lawrence, Le Gassick, Price) 4:08
7. "I Wish It Could Be Me" (Lawrence, LeGassick, Price, Real) - 4:19
8. "So Much Pain" (Lawrence, Real) - 4:28
9. "If You Wanna Get Down" (Lawrence, Real) - 3:36
10. "Time" (Lawrence, Real, Dane Bryant) - 3:11

== Personnel ==
- Joey Lawrence – vocals, backing vocals, arrangements (3, 4, 8)
- Steve Goldstein – keyboards, programming, arrangements (1, 2, 9)
- Steve Barri – keyboards, guitars, bass, drum programming
- Steve Le Gassick – keyboards, guitars, bass, drum programming, arrangements (3, 4, 6, 7)
- Michael Price – keyboards, guitars, bass, drum programming, arrangements (3, 4, 6, 7)
- John Andrew Schreiner – keyboards, programming
- Steve Carnelli – guitars
- Brian Ray – guitars
- Michito Sanchez – percussion
- James Sitterly – string arrangements
- Matthew Lawrence – backing vocals
- Josef Powell – backing vocals
- Steve Real – backing vocals
- Julia Waters – backing vocals
- Maxine Waters – backing vocals
- Oren Waters – backing vocals
- Yvonne Williams – backing vocals

=== Production ===
- Joey Lawrence – producer, cover design
- Steve Goldstein – producer (1, 2, 5, 9, 10), remixing (3, 4, 6–8)
- Steve Barri – producer (3, 4, 6–8)
- Bryan Campbell – engineer (1, 2, 5, 9, 10), remix engineer (3, 4, 6–8)
- Leon Johnson – recording (3, 4, 6–8), mixing (3, 4, 6–8)
- Gil Morales – assistant engineer (1)
- Jeff Shannon – assistant engineer (1)
- Brian Young – assistant engineer (1)
- Julie Barri – production coordinator (3, 4, 6–8)
- Dan Shepelavy – cover design
- Stiletto Entertainment – cover design, management
- Greg Gorman – photography
- Garry C. Kief – management
- Steve Wax – management

== Personnel ==
- Joey Lawrence: Lead Vocal
- Steve Barri: Electric & Acoustic Guitars, Bass, Keyboards, Drum Programming
- Steve Carnelli: Electric & Acoustic Guitars
- Steve Goldstein: Keyboards, Programming
- Steve LeGassick: Electric & Acoustic Guitars, Bass, Keyboards, Drum Programming
- Michael Price: Electric & Acoustic Guitars, Bass, Keyboards, Drum Programming
- Brian Ray: Electric & Acoustic Guitars
- Machito Sanchez: Percussion
- John Schreiner: Keyboards, Programming
- Matt Lawrence, Joseph Powell, Steve Real, Julia Waters, Oren Waters, Maxine Willard-Waters, Yvonne Williams: Backing Vocals

== Production ==
- Produced By Steve Barri, Joey Lawrence & Steve Goldstein
- Recorded & Engineered By Bryan Campbell & Leon Johnson
- Assistant Engineers: Jeffrey Shannon, Brett Swain, Brian Young
- Mixing: Leon Johnson
- Re-Mixing: Bryan Campbell, Steve Goldstein
