= Jessica DiCicco =

American actress (born 1980)

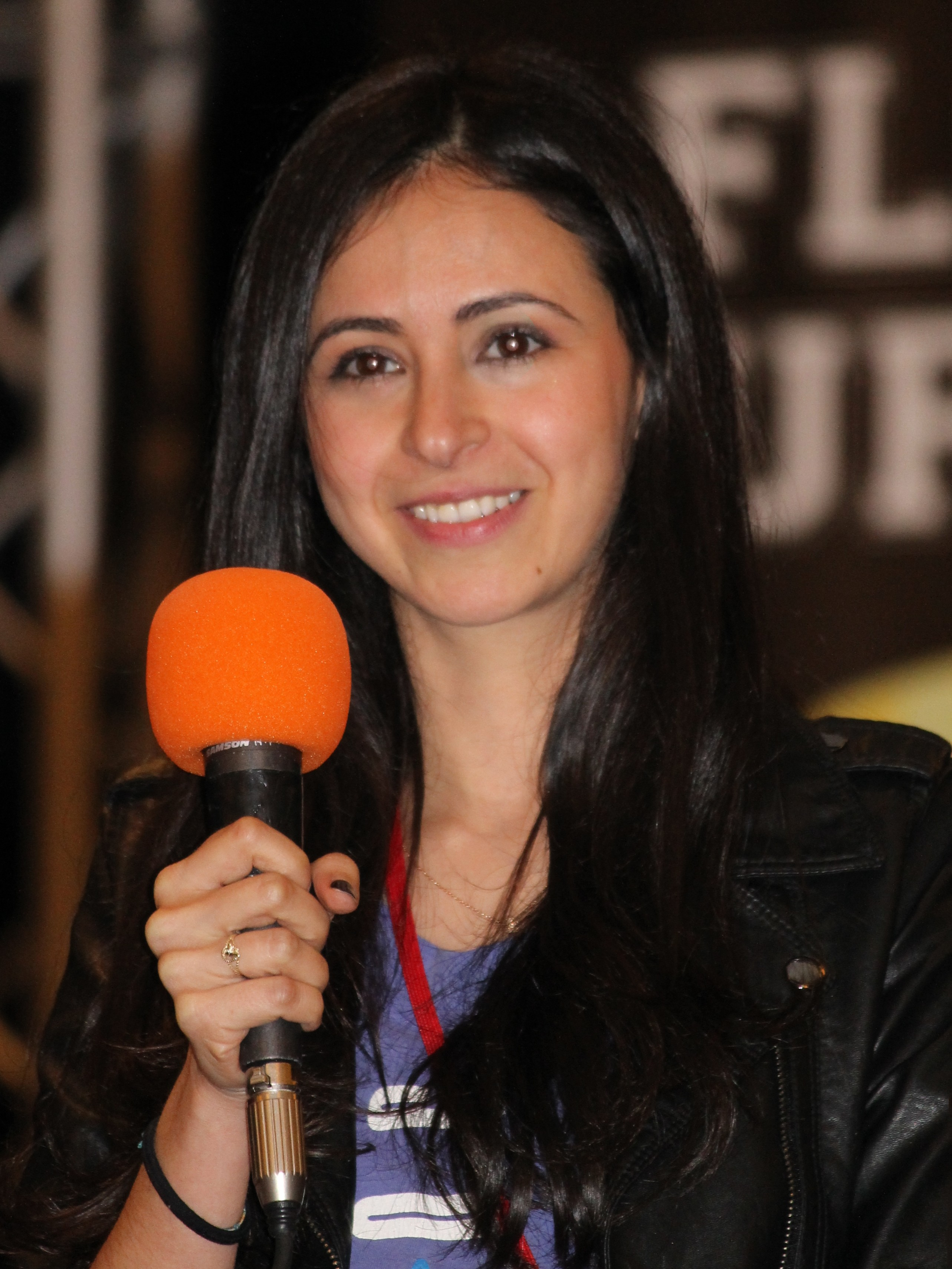
- DiCicco in 2014
- Born: Jessica Sonya DiCicco; June 10, 1980 (age 46); Los Angeles, California, U.S.
- Education: Syracuse University
- Occupation: Actress
- Years active: 1989–present
- Agent: Abrams Artists
- Spouse: Josh Lewis (m. 2017)
- Children: 2
- Parents: Bobby Di Cicco (father); Margo Malkin (mother)

Jessica Sonya DiCicco (/ˈdɪtʃiːkoʊ/; born June 10, 1980) is an American actress. She is known for voicing in animated television series and video games. Her first voice role was the announcer for Nickelodeon's educational channel Noggin. DiCicco has since voiced various other characters for Nickelodeon, including Gwen Wu in The Mighty B!, Selina and Miele in Winx Club, Lucy Loud and Lynn Loud Jr. in The Loud House, and Annie Bramley in It's Pony. Since 2012, she also serves as the announcer for the Nick Jr. Channel. She also had voice roles on Disney Junior, including Toby the Cactus in Sheriff Callie's Wild West, Hissy in Puppy Dog Pals, and Summer Penguin in Muppet Babies.

Some of her voice roles on other networks include Maggie Pesky in Disney Channel's The Buzz on Maggie and Flame Princess in Cartoon Network's Adventure Time, which earned her worldwide recognition. She received a Daytime Emmy nomination for voicing Malina in The Emperor's New School.

== Early life ==
DiCicco was born in Los Angeles, California on June 10, 1980. Her father is television and film actor Bobby Di Cicco. Her family moved to New York City when she was young and she was raised on the Upper West Side. In second grade, she was selected by Marlo Thomas to appear on the ABC special Free to Be... A Family. She was also cast by Francis Ford Coppola in The Godfather Part III as an unnamed child, and also had a guest role in Kate and Allie. She had a small role as young Cindy Zagarella in the 1993 film Household Saints.

At age 15, she was the photographer on a cover story for New York magazine about prep school gangsters, which was published in December 1996. DiCicco has also worked on music from Kimbo Educational. In 1998, she and her castmates Julianne Michelle, Keith Franklin, and Peter Tombaki received a joint nomination for "Best Performance in a TV movie/pilot/made for video Young Ensemble" for the unsold tv series pilot Bus No. 9.

== Career ==
DiCicco attended Newhouse School at Syracuse University, hoping to learn more about production as she had primarily done on-camera work with Nickelodeon. Before heading to college, she met Newhouse alum and Nickelodeon producer Mike Pecoriello, who offered her an opportunity to be the voice of a new educational channel called Noggin. She agreed to do the work while being a student and offered to record promos from Syracuse. She was the voice of Noggin throughout her college years and graduated in 2002. She was also the voice of Miguzi's Erin on Cartoon Network.

In 1998, DiCicco appeared in the NBC miniseries Witness to the Mob and in the TV film In the Nick of Time. Besides her appearances in television and commercials, DiCicco has worked on stage with several repertory companies. In 1999, DiCicco and her co-stars in the Nickelodeon pilot Bus No. 9 were nominated a Young Artist Award, but lost to The Sweetest Gift. She also starred in a miniseries called As Our Schoolbus Turns.

As a voice actress, DiCicco had lead roles on The Buzz on Maggie, The Emperor's New School, Loonatics Unleashed, and Shuriken School. She had recurring roles on The Replacements, El Tigre: The Adventures of Manny Rivera, American Dragon: Jake Long, Bratz, and All Grown Up!. She co-starred as Shelby in the DreamWorks film Over the Hedge and voiced Gwen Wu on Amy Poehler's television series for Nickelodeon, The Mighty B!. DiCicco was the voice of Master Viper in the Kung Fu Panda short film Secrets of the Furious Five. In 2012, she joined the Cartoon Network show Adventure Time starting from its season three finale, where she frequently voiced Flame Princess over the last seven of its ten seasons. She also voiced in Pound Puppies and Gravity Falls. She also voices Lynn and Lucy Loud in the Nickelodeon animated series, The Loud House. She was nominated for a Daytime Emmy in 2008 for her performance as Malina on The Emperor's New School, but lost to Eartha Kitt, who voiced Yzma in the same series. DiCicco provides the voice of Toby the cactus and the sounds of the mule Clementine on Sheriff Callie's Wild West.

DiCicco has also contributed to several video games, including Psychonauts, Kingdom Hearts II, Hot Shots Tennis, Resonance of Fate, and Pimp My Ride.

== Filmography ==
=== Animation ===
List of voice performances in animation
Year	Series	Role	Notes	Source
2005–06	The Buzz on Maggie	Maggie Pesky	Main role	Resume
2005–06	Jim Henson's Frances	Frances		Resume
2005–06	Bratz	Roxxi, Fianna		Resume
2005–07	Loonatics Unleashed	Lexi Bunny		
2006–08	The Emperor's New School	Malina		Resume
2006	Danger Rangers	Manny, Moe	Episode: "Medicine Mix-Up"	
2006–07	Shuriken School	Okuni, Ami, Kita, Kimura Twins, Yota		Resume
2008–11	The Mighty B!	Gwen Wu		
2008	The Secret Saturdays	Tiacapari		
2008	The Penguins of Madagascar	Bradley, Ramona, Samuel		
2008–09	Random! Cartoons	Smart Alec, Gloom, Fuzzy Animal	Episodes: "Sparkle and Gloom" and "Hero Heights"	
2010–12	Kick Buttowski: Suburban Daredevil	Penelope Patterson	2 episodes	
2012–18	Adventure Time	Flame Princess	Main role	
2012	Motorcity	Ruby the Dark Slayer	Episode: "Ride of the Fantasy Vans"	
2012–15	Gravity Falls	Tambry, Giffany		
2013–18	Sofia the First	Grotta		
2013–15	Henry Hugglemonster	Harry Hugglemonster, Dee Hugglemonster		
2013–14	Winx Club	Selina, Lucy, Miele	Nickelodeon dub	
2014–17	Sheriff Callie's Wild West	Toby, Clementine	Main role	
2015	Guardians of the Galaxy	Tana		
2015	X-Ray and Vav	Ash Samaya		
2015–18	Be Cool, Scooby-Doo!	Amelia	Episode: "American Goth"	
2016	The Lion Guard	Genet	Episode: "Beware the Zimwi"	
2016	Uncle Grandpa	Virginia	Episode: "MacGuffin"	
2016–present	The Loud House	Lynn Loud, Lucy Loud, Zach Gurdle, others	Main role	
2016–18	Future-Worm!	Bug	Main role	
2016–17	Rolling with the Ronks!	Mila		
2016–21	Ben 10	Frightwig		
2017–19	Hanazuki: Full of Treasures	Hanazuki, Blue Hemka, Lime Green Hemka	Main role	
2017–23	Puppy Dog Pals	Hissy, others	Main role	
2017–20	Dorothy and the Wizard of Oz	Wilhelmina, Patchwork Girl		
2017	Teenage Mutant Ninja Turtles	Mira	3 episodes	Resume
2018–22	Muppet Babies	Summer Penguin	Main role	
2018	Craig of the Creek	Turner	Episode: "Bring Out Your Beast"	
2018	Legend of the Three Caballeros	April, May, June		
2018–20	Ballmastrz: 9009	Ace Ambling, Duleena "Dee Dee" Duneeda	Main role	
2019	New Looney Tunes	Petunia Pig		
2020	The Casagrandes	Lynn Loud, Lucy Loud	Episode: "Cursed!"	
2020–22	It's Pony	Annie Bramley	Main role	
2020–22	Close Enough	Candice, Herself	Main role	
2021–22	Yabba-Dabba Dinosaurs	Pebbles Flintstone	Main role	
2021–24	The Ghost and Molly McGee	Gertrude, Octavius, Mary Brunson, Shelly Brunson		
2022–26	Supertato	Evil Pea		
2025	Chibiverse	Maggie Pesky	Episode: "Journey to the Center of the Chibiverse"	

=== Anime ===
List of English dubbing performances in anime
Year	Series	Role	Notes	Source
2015	Fate/stay night: Unlimited Blade Works	Yukika Saegusa		
2019	Demon Slayer: Kimetsu no Yaiba	Shigeru Kamado, Young Hand Demon		
2020	Sword Art Online	Yotte		
2021	Thus Spoke Kishibe Rohan	Ikkyū	Episode: "Millionaire Village"	
2021	Yashahime: Princess Half-Demon	Meifuku	Episode: "Meifuku the Meiōjū"	
2021	Kageki Shojo!!	Asuka Yano		
2023	Ōoku: The Inner Chambers	Princess Chiyo, Tokugawa Iemitsu (Young), O-Ei		
2023	Pluto	Takashi, Anton		
2023	Akuma-kun	Ichika Tuchiya		
2024–25	Go! Go! Loser Ranger!	Kanon Hisui		
2025	Mobile Suit Gundam GQuuuuuuX	Sepha		

=== Feature films ===
List of voice performances in feature films
Year	Title	Role	Notes	Source
2006	Over the Hedge	Shelby		
2021	Demon Slayer: Kimetsu no Yaiba – The Movie: Mugen Train	Shigeru Kamado		
2022	Belle	Hiroka "Hiro" Betsuyaku		
2023	The Super Mario Bros. Movie	Mayor Pauline, Mario and Luigi's mother, Baby Peach, Yellow Toad at the Council, Plumbing Commercial Woman, Bully		

=== Direct-to-video and television films ===
List of voice performances in direct-to-video and television films
Year	Title	Role	Notes	Source
2006	Bratz: Passion 4 Fashion Diamondz	Sharidan		
2008	Kung Fu Panda: Secrets of the Furious Five	Young Viper		
2008	Unstable Fables: Goldilocks & 3 Bears Show	Misty Bear, Gretel, Girl Fan 2		
2011	Pixie Hollow Games	Lilac		
2014	Jungle Shuffle	Sacha, Young Sacha		
2016	Lego DC Comics Super Heroes: Justice League: Cosmic Clash	Supergirl		
2016	DC Super Hero Girls: Hero of the Year	Star Sapphire		
2017	Scooby-Doo! Shaggy's Showdown	Desdemona Gunderson		
2017	DC Super Hero Girls: Intergalactic Games	Star Sapphire, Lashina		
2017	CarGo	Rudy		
2021	The Loud House Movie	Lynn Loud, Lucy Loud		
2024	No Time to Spy: A Loud House Movie	Lynn Loud, Lucy Loud		
2025	A Loud House Christmas Movie: Naughty or Nice	Lynn Loud, Lucy Loud		

=== Video games ===
List of voice performances in video games
Year	Title	Role	Notes	Source
2005	Psychonauts	Franke Athens		
2006	Kingdom Hearts II	Olette	also Final Mix in 2007	
2007	Hot Shots Tennis	Ashley		
2010	White Knight Chronicles	Additional voices	Credited as Jessica Di Cicco	
2010	Final Fantasy XIII	Cocoon Inhabitants		
2010	Resonance of Fate	Leanne		
2011	Rise of Nightmares	Monica		
2013	The Croods: Prehistoric Party	Sandy		
2014	Lightning Returns: Final Fantasy XIII	Lumina		
2015	Adventure Time: Finn & Jake Investigations	Flame Princess, Tree Stump		
2016	Lego Dimensions	Flame Princess		
2021	Nickelodeon All-Star Brawl	Lucy Loud	Voiceover added in the June 2022 update	
2021	Guilty Gear Strive	Delilah		
2021	Demon Slayer: Kimetsu no Yaiba – The Hinokami Chronicles	Shigeru Kamado, Hand Demon (child)		
2022	Nickelodeon Kart Racers 3: Slime Speedway	Lucy Loud, Chuckie Finster		
2022	Bratz: Flaunt Your Fashion	Roxxi		
2023	The Wonderful 101 Remastered	Sue	Downloadable content: The Wonderful One: After School Hero	
2023	Nickelodeon All-Star Brawl 2	Lucy Loud		

=== Other dub roles ===
List of voice performances in other dubs
Year	Title	Role	Notes	Source
1996	Innie & Outie	Outie	Nickelodeon short film	
1999–2003	Noggin	Announcer 1999–2002; Feetface 2002–03		
2004–07	Miguzi	Erin		Website
2005	Ready Dress Go!	Lucy		
2010	Two and a Half Men	Jenny (V.O.)	Episode: "Aye, Aye, Captain Douche"	
2010	Modern Family	Baby Lily	Episode: "Fears"	Press
2012–present	Nick Jr. Channel	Announcer		
2015	Dog with a Blog	The voice of Freddy, Puppy Stan		

=== Live action ===
List of acting performances in film and television
Year	Title	Role	Notes	Source
1989	Kate and Allie		Episode: "The Wedding"	
1990	The Godfather Part III	Child		
1993	Household Saints	Young Cindy Zagarella		Resume
1998	Witness to the Mob	Karen	Television film	Resume
1998	Bus No. 9	Jessica	Television film	Resume
2013	I Know That Voice	Herself	Documentary	
