= Frankie Meets Jack =

2023 film by Andrew Lawrence

- Directed by: Andrew Lawrence
- Screenplay by: Jen Bashian; Samantha Cope; Joey Lawrence
- Produced by: Richard Switzer
- Starring: Joey Lawrence; Samantha Cope; Carl McDowell; Sharayu Mahele; Anne Heche
- Cinematography: Joseph R. Fitzgerald
- Edited by: Thjis Bazelmans
- Music by: David Bateman
- Production companies: MarVista Entertainment; Dawn's Light
- Distributed by: Tubi
- Release date: February 3, 2023
- Running time: 85 minutes
- Country: United States
- Language: English

Frankie Meets Jack is a 2023 American romantic comedy film directed by Andrew Lawrence, written by Jen Bashian, Samantha Cope, and Joey Lawrence, and produced by Richard Switzer. The film stars Joey Lawrence, Samantha Cope, Carl McDowell, Sharayu Mahele, and Anne Heche.

== Cast ==
- Joey Lawrence as Jack Shaw
- Samantha Cope as Frankie
- Carl McDowell as Boner
- Sharayu Mahale as Melody
- Anne Heche as Katrina
- Andrew Lawrence as Nathaniel
- Brytnee Ratledge as Stacy
- Pamela Mitchell as Angela
- Madeline Grey DeFreece as Tara
- Ryan Youngwood Kim as Todd
- Zachary Gaviria as Dylan
- Mary Looram as Mary
- Joe Harkins as Harry
- Reid Perkins as Wedding Officiant

== Production ==
Production of the film takes place in Braintree, Massachusetts from June 27 to July 13, 2022.

== Release ==
Frankie Meets Jack was released in Tubi on February 3, 2023. The film is dedicated in memory of Heche, who died before the film was released.

== Reception ==
Josh Bell from Crooked Marquee said, "Stars Lawrence and Cope, who wrote the screenplay themselves along with Jen Bashian, have minimal chemistry, and only the late Anne Heche livens things up as Frankie's roommate’s eccentric mom. Somehow, even the dog acting is bad. Grade: C−".
