= The Emperor's New School =

American animated television series

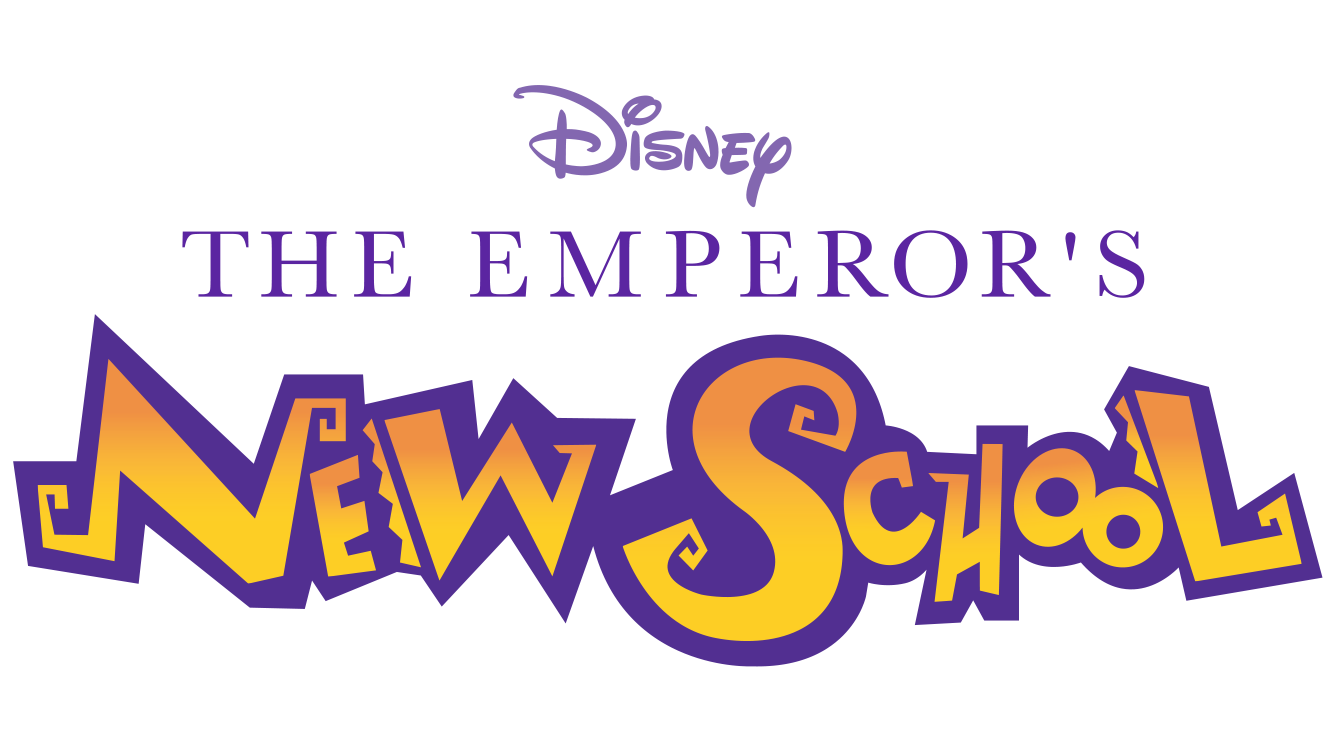
- Created by: Mark Dindal
- Based on: The Emperor's New Groove by David Reynolds; Chris Williams; Mark Dindal
- Written by: Kevin D. Campbell; Ed Scharlach
- Story by: Mark Dindal
- Directed by: David Knott; Howy Parkins
- Voices of: J. P. Manoux; Jessica DiCicco; Patrick Warburton; Eartha Kitt; Fred Tatasciore; John Goodman; Shane Baumel; Curtis Armstrong; Bob Bergen; Rip Taylor
- Theme music composer: Danny Jacob
- Opening theme: "Kuzco Academy"
- Composer: Michael Tavera
- Country of origin: United States
- Original language: English
- No. of seasons: 2
- No. of episodes: 52 (90 segments) (list of episodes)

Production
- Executive producer: Bobs Gannaway
- Running time: 22 minutes
- Production company: Walt Disney Television Animation

Original release
- Network: Disney Channel
- Release: January 27, 2006 – November 20, 2008

The Emperor's New School is an American animated television series created by Mark Dindal that aired on Disney Channel for two seasons between January 2006 and November 2008. It is the second sequel to the 2000 film The Emperor's New Groove, following the direct-to-video release of the film Kronk's New Groove in 2005. The series centers on Kuzco, who must graduate from Kuzco Academy to become emperor of the Inca Empire. Yzma, his former advisor, schemes to sabotage him so she can be empress instead. She is aided by her henchman Kronk, while Kuzco is aided by the villager Pacha and fellow student Malina. The series combines physical comedy with a self-aware tone, illustrated by Kuzco frequently addressing the viewer directly.

The Walt Disney Company developed the series after The Emperor's New Groove received high ratings in syndication. Most of the film's cast reprised their roles for the series. J. P. Manoux replaced David Spade as Kuzco, and Fred Tatasciore played Pacha until the original actor, John Goodman, returned for the second season. New School used traditional 2D animation to preserve elements of the film's distinctive art style. The choice of a high school setting was made to explore Kuzco's lack of social etiquette and provide for storylines based on the everyday challenges of adolescence.

In January 2006, New School premiered on four platforms: Disney Channel, ABC, Toon Disney, and Disney Channel. Both seasons have been distributed via digital download on the iTunes Store and streaming through Disney+. New School received mixed reviews from critics; several reviewers praised Eartha Kitt's voice acting but others found the characters unlikable and critiqued the sexist objectification of Malina. New School was also criticized for its minimal educational value and frequent displays of socially aggressive behavior.

== Premise ==
=== Story and characters ===
The Emperor's New School follows Kuzco, a brash emperor-in-waiting who must graduate from Kuzco Academy to reclaim his throne as emperor of the Inca Empire. The educational requirement comes to light on Kuzco's birthday, when he had expected to officially assume the throne; instead, he is evicted from his own palace. Despite the setting and historical time period, Kuzco Academy resembles a modern American-style high school. The focus of story arcs is often placed on Kuzco learning life lessons about the importance of friendship and hard work, for instance. The series also addresses issues like peer pressure, self-esteem, and responsibility.

Kuzco's former royal advisor Yzma disguises herself as the academy's principal, Amzy, and repeatedly attempts to prevent him from graduating so that she can instead claim the throne as empress for herself. She is motivated by personal ambition and a desire to take revenge on Kuzco because of his humiliating mistreatment of her when she served as his advisor. In the first season, Kuzco is often transformed into an animal by potions from Yzma's lab, typically to thwart his efforts to finish school assignments. Kronk, Yzma's henchman, poses as a fellow student at Kuzco Academy. Although Kronk is an antagonist, he is less devious than Yzma and is instead driven by his sense of loyalty to her.

As a student, Kuzco lives with the peasant Pacha, his wife Chicha, and their children Chaca, Tipo, and Yupi. The family's modest home differs greatly from the opulent royal palace to which Kuzco had been accommodated. Despite their contrasting lifestyles, Pacha acts as a father figure for Kuzco, helping him with his assignments. In one instance, Pacha trains Kuzco for a race to pass a physical education class. Kuzco is also assisted by Malina, a cheerleader and the "president of every club". Characterized by her intelligence and popularity, Malina challenges Kuzco and scolds him for his narcissism, insensitivity, and spoiled behavior. Kuzco, who has a crush on Malina, often refers to her as a "hottie hot hottie". Other supporting characters include the Royal Records Keeper and Kuzco's teacher, Mr. Moleguaco. While Mr. Moleguaco—whose name is a pun on "guacamole"—is a wise and generally helpful teacher, he is also short-tempered and often driven to frustration by Kuzco's antics. In the series finale, Kuzco graduates and becomes emperor; he invites Pacha, Chicha, Chaca, Tipo, and Yupi to live with him in the palace and makes Kronk his royal advisor, with Yzma as an assistant. Kuzo starts dating Malina, who works as a reporter.

=== Continuity and humor ===
New School is the second sequel of the 2000 film The Emperor's New Groove following the 2005 direct-to-video release Kronk's New Groove. The series is set after the events of The Emperor's New Groove, and premiered roughly a month after the release of Kronk's New Groove. Among its sources of humor are several running gags and callbacks to the original film, such as Yzma being harmed whenever Kronk pulls the wrong lever to her secret lab, and Kronk making his signature dish, spinach puffs. There are some apparent plot discrepancies between the series and the film. For example, Kuzco has reverted to his original narcissistic personality, seemingly undoing the personal growth he underwent over the course of the film. Meanwhile, Yzma returns in New School as a human even though she was last seen in the film after being transformed into a cat.

The series uses physical comedy and wit to appeal to children. Jacqueline Cutler, writing for Zap2it, described New School's humor as similar to vaudeville, and cited a scene in which Kuzco flashes his boxers as an example. The series also has a similar "self-aware" approach to the original film by continuing Kuzco's dual role as the protagonist and narrator. Kuzco talks directly to the audience, like in the film, and edits episodes to fit his preference. Examples of this narration include Kuzco stopping a scene to make a sarcastic comment or doodle his ideas on ruled paper. The doodles, which became the basis for an entire episode, was one of the series' recurring schticks. Executive producer Bobs Gannaway described the series as having "postmodern touches" due to these interactions with the audience.

Inspired by the comic timing of the Austin Powers films, the series makes frequent use of awkward pauses in its dialogue. Jeanne Spreier, writing for The Dallas Morning News, said the show's sense of humor relies on one-line jokes that are more likely to appeal to older children than "youngsters". Spreier noted the storylines dealt with "the more common problems of adolescence" and the school setting was grounded in "decidedly contemporary American attributes", including such clichés as the overachiever (embodied by Malina), subpar cafeteria food, and a physical education teacher who refuses to accept any student excuse for avoiding class participation. New School often incorporated "modern-day accouterments", such as an episode about fictional Inca forms of Christmas (Giftmas) and Santa Claus (Papa Santos).

== Production ==
=== Concept and creation ===
Although The Emperor's New Groove had disappointing box-office returns compared to the earlier Disney Renaissance films, subsequent broadcasts of the film on Disney's pay television channels drew large audiences. Its 2002 broadcast premiere on Disney Channel received high ratings, ranking first in its time period with a viewership that included 1.3 million children between the ages of 6 and 11 and 1.2 million tweens between the ages of 9 and 14. Reruns of the film over the next three years continued to draw large viewing figures and rank first in the ratings. When shown on Toon Disney, The Emperor's New Groove increased the channel's audience share for the time slot by 125 percent compared to the previous year. The film was also a commercial success on home video, selling millions of copies on VHS and DVD. According to Gary Marsh, the president of Disney Channels Worldwide, the film's post-box office success led to the commission of New School. The series was first announced in 2004 for a 2006 release, with The Emperor's New Skool as its tentative, deliberately misspelled title.

The Walt Disney Company approached Bobs Gannaway to be executive producer of a spin-off series several years after the film's release. Gannaway had previously worked on television adaptations of other Disney properties, including Timon & Pumbaa (a spin-off of The Lion King centered on the two titular characters) and Lilo & Stitch: The Series (from the film of the same name). His work on these shows had established his reputation as the "go-to guy" for expanding on pre-existing films. New Groove director Mark Dindal approved the selection of Gannaway, as the two had become friends following their collaboration on the 1997 animated film Cats Don't Dance. Dindal was credited as creator of the series, and Howy Parkins and David Knott as directors. The writing staff was led by Dindal, Kevin Campbell, and Ed Scharlach. New School was Disney's last spin-off series for children above preschool age until the 2017 premiere of Rapunzel's Tangled Adventure.

The writers chose the school setting for the show because they felt this environment would provide better opportunities to explore Kuzco's lack of social etiquette. According to Gannaway, episodes of the show would feature "socially redeeming stories", in which Kuzco works through problems with his teachers and classmates. He also said New School would be unique because of the unusual character dynamic in the source material: unlike most of Disney's other animated features, which tend to pair serious lead characters with comic sidekicks, The Emperor's New Groove features a comedic lead character among "well-defined" side characters. While Gannaway acknowledged viewers might initially dislike Kuzco because of his selfish attitude, he hoped the series would portray him as a "sympathetic jerk" who "really doesn't know any better".

=== Cast ===
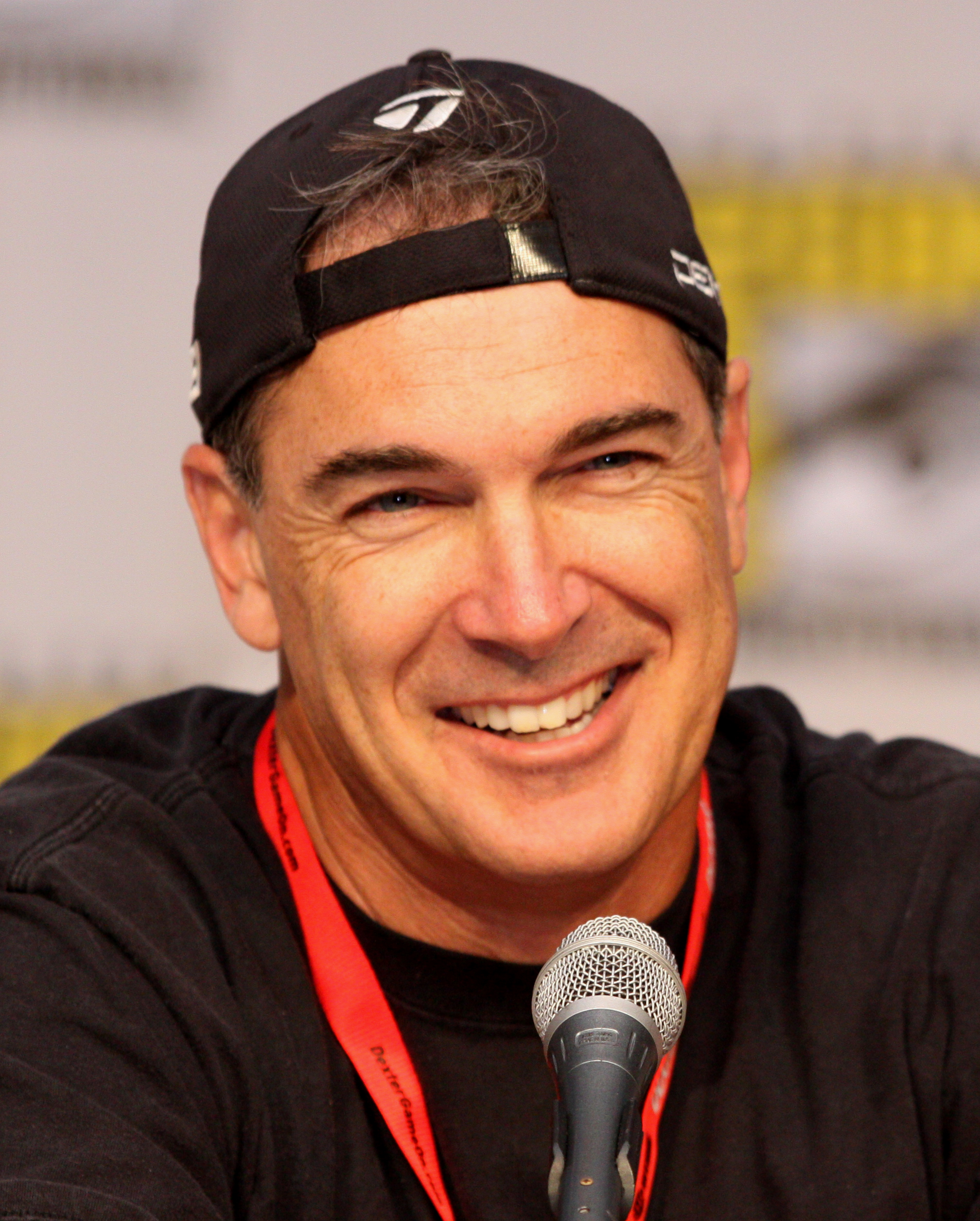
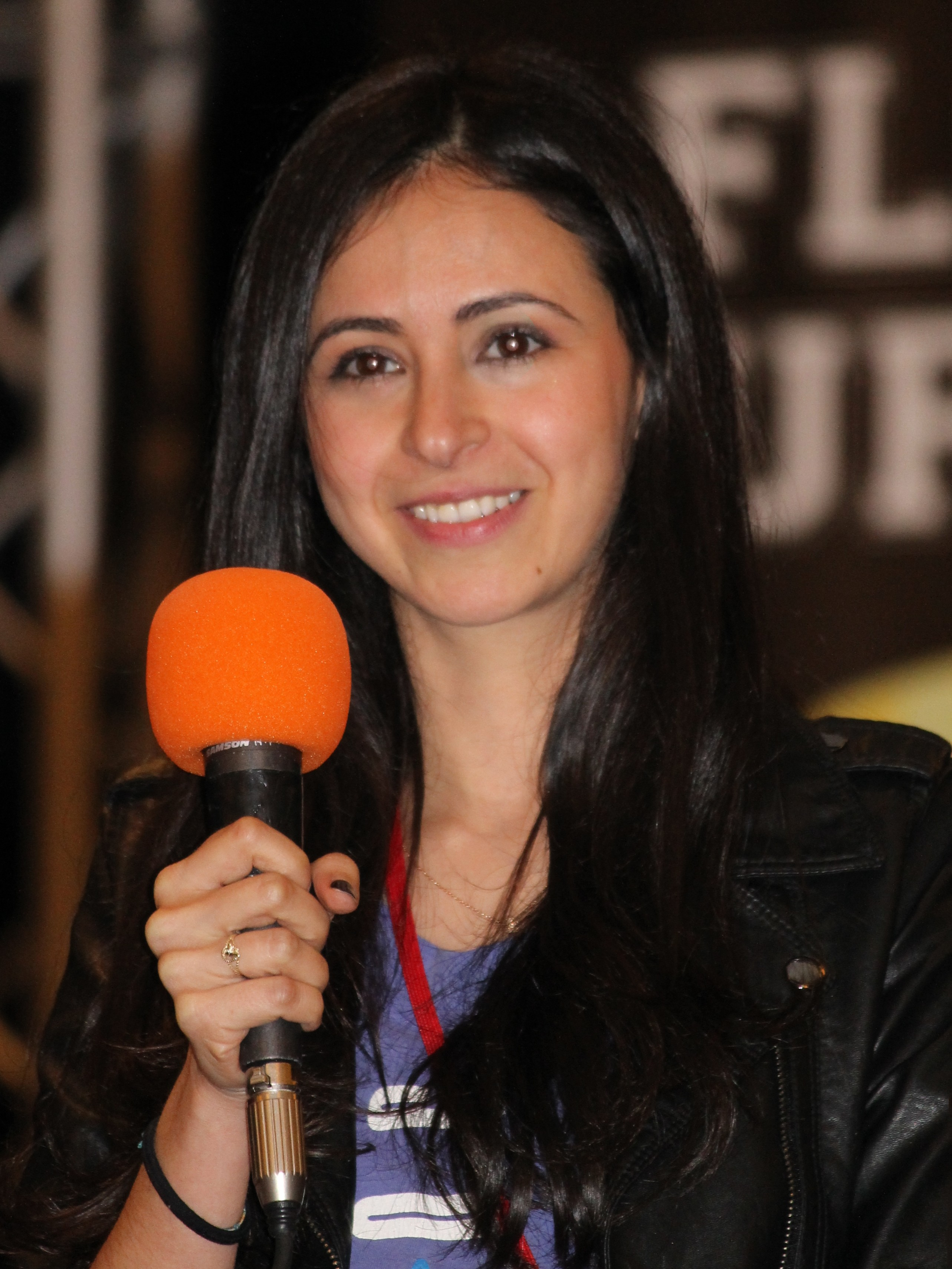
Patrick Warburton (pictured left in 2010) was one of several voice actors who reprised their roles for New School, while Jessica DiCicco (pictured right in 2014) voiced a new character in The Emperor's New Groove franchise.

A majority of the film's voice cast returned for the series. Eartha Kitt and Patrick Warburton reprised their roles as Yzma and Kronk, respectively. Kitt repeatedly expressed her enthusiastic attachment to the character. In a July 2006 interview, she said "[Children] know my name, and they ask me to say one of the lines. ... I love it. It means that I'm still alive and still wanted!" While working on New School, Warburton was also a recurring voice actor on four other series, including the Disney Channel original Kim Possible.

J. P. Manoux replaced David Spade, the original voice for Kuzco in The Emperor's New Groove, in New School. Although Spade had reprised the role for Kronk's New Groove, Manoux portrayed the character in other media, such as The Emperor's New Groove video game, an episode of the animated series House of Mouse, and the 2001 animated film Mickey's Magical Christmas: Snowed in at the House of Mouse. Manoux had debuted as Kuzco in a DVD bonus feature for The Emperor's New Groove. Critics described Manoux's version of Kuzco as so similar to Spade's performance that it was essentially an impression.

John Goodman, the original voice for Pacha, was replaced by Fred Tatasciore for New School. Some media outlets attributed Brian Cummings with the role, but Cummings instead had voiced unnamed miscellaneous characters for 11 episodes. Cummings had done "advance voice work" for Pacha as part of The Emperor's New Groove's development. Goodman returned to voice Pacha for the second season.

Bob Bergen and Wendie Malick reprised their roles as Bucky the squirrel and Chicha, respectively. Although Bergen did not record with Warburton, he said they had good chemistry in their scenes, and joked: "But when edited together we are Abbott and Costello." The rest of the main cast are Jessica DiCicco as Malina, Shane Baumel as Tipo, Rip Taylor as the Royal Records Keeper, and Curtis Armstrong as Mr. Moleguaco. Guest appearances included Miley and Noah Cyrus, Joey Lawrence, Gabriel Iglesias, and Dylan and Cole Sprouse.

=== Animation and music ===
New School uses traditional 2D animation by Toon City and Wang Film Productions. Flash animation had been dismissed as incompatible during development. In an attempt to preserve The Emperor's New Groove's art style, Gannaway kept its focus on the characters. He explained that the original film had made the characters appear "flatter" against "solid washed-up backgrounds", which "helped [them] pop"; his intention was that the series should continue this technique. Each episode took roughly nine months to complete, and between 16 and 17 were developed at a time.

Janis Liebhart co-wrote the theme music, "Kuzco Academy", which was produced by Danny Jacob. It is a "rocking march number" and "pastiche college fight song" featuring Kuzco bragging about himself. Jacob had previously written the theme music for Lilo & Stitch: The Series, which he described as his "first home run", and went on to become a frequent composer for Disney. Jacob wrote, produced, and arranged other songs for New School. Michael Tavera was the composer for the series, and arranged one song ("New Kid Ozker").

Laura Dickinson contributed to the music, performing the songs "Let's Brock", "Kuzco Dance", "Our Academy", and "Kronk For Hire". For the episode "Yzmopolis", Kitt recorded a song of the same name and a one-off intro segment. After recording the song "Yzmopolis," Kitt said she "loved every minute of singing" it because "the added dimension of a singing voice gives my character an added and vital layer," and proclaimed, "May Yzma sing forever and often!"

== Episodes ==
Season	Segments	Episodes	Originally released	
Season	Segments	Episodes	First released	Last released
1	33	21	January 27, 2006	November 11, 2006
2	57	31	June 23, 2007	November 20, 2008

== Broadcast history and release ==
New School was aired on three television channels—the subscription-based services Disney Channel and Toon Disney, as well as the broadcast network ABC—and made available on demand through Disney Channel On Demand. The first episode, "Rabbit Face", premiered at 7:30 pm EST on Disney Channel on Friday, January 27, 2006; it was shown on Disney Channel, ABC, and Toon Disney between January 27 and 29. AllMovie's Hal Erickson said this sort of scheduling was a "typical" example of Disney's "super-saturation" broadcast practice. The series was also promoted with a website that included minigames, video clips from "Rabbit Face", and downloadable images, wallpapers, and messenger icons of the main characters.

Each episode runs for 22 minutes and carries a "suitable for all ages" TV-G parental rating. According to TheGamer, the series was "notable for its popularity"; it was later cited in a 2019 Screen Rant article as one of the "forgotten" or "less-known" Disney Channel shows. The series finale aired on November 20, 2008.

The series is distributed by Disney and the American Broadcasting Company (ABC). Both seasons have been made available to purchase as a digital download on the iTunes Store and to stream on Disney+. Previously, New School had been made available to stream on Netflix beginning in 2009 as part a licensing deal that included several other Disney Channel series. Disney discontinued any further licensing deals with Netflix in 2019, when it launched Disney+. New School was also available on Disney's test streaming service, DisneyLife, which was rebranded in 2019 as Disney+.

== Reception ==
=== Critical reception ===
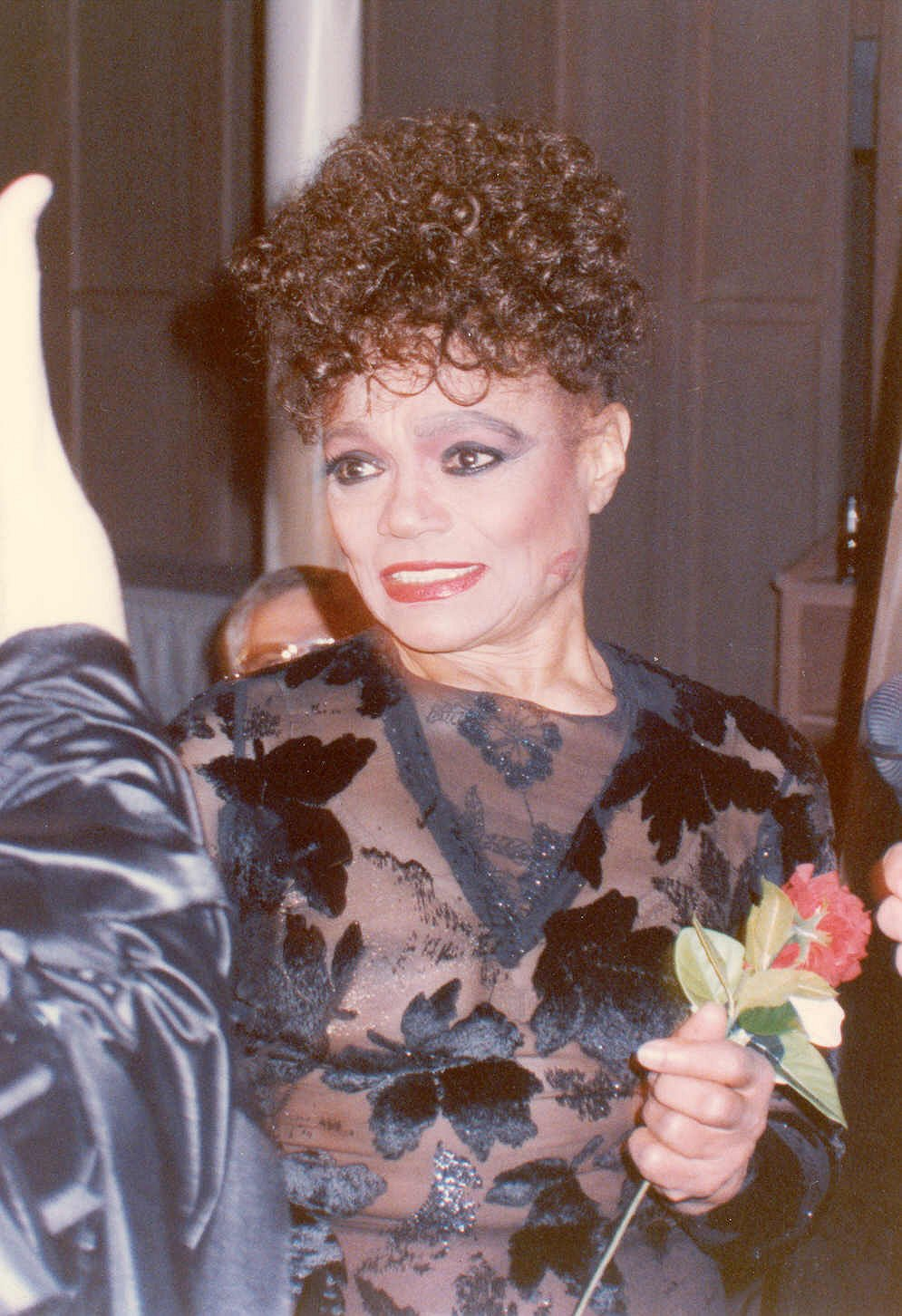
Eartha Kitt (pictured in 2006) received two Annie Awards and two Daytime Emmy Awards for her performance as Yzma.

Upon its initial broadcast, New School received mixed reviews from critics. Animation World Network's Sarah Baisley enjoyed its look, which she described as "simple but attractive background designs that work well for TV delivery". Praising the series for its "irreverent good humor", Karen MacPherson of the Pittsburgh Post-Gazette cited the "Kuzco's Doodles" segment as a highlight. She believed the focus on comedy prevented the storylines from becoming "preachy". Several publications criticized the characters as being obnoxious, a focal point of Pam Gelman's review for Common Sense Media, which dismissed the series for its "lackluster animation and annoying characters" and questioned why anyone would voluntarily help someone as selfish as Kuzco. Kevin McDonough, writing for the United Feature Syndicate, panned New School as "the kind of kids' cartoon that gives kids' cartoons a bad name." In McDonough's view, the characters' inclination to shout most of the dialogue would be especially irritating for parents.

Critics have also had mixed reactions to New School in retrospective reviews. Although he disliked the series overall, author David Perlmutter praised its animation and the performances of Kitt and Warburton. The voice cast received similar praise in Screen Rant reviews by Matthew Trzcinski and Katerina Daley, even though both deemed the series inferior to the film. On the other hand, Perlmutter believed New School destroyed the original film's charm and criticized Disney for their tendency to adapt virtually all of their films into television programs. He classified New School as one of Disney's "derivative adaptions", alongside such series as Buzz Lightyear of Star Command (a spin-off of Toy Story) and The Legend of Tarzan (a sequel to Tarzan), which he described as generally "very thinly written" and overly reliant on their audiences' assumed familiarity with the source material.

=== Criticism of educational value ===
New School has been criticized for its low educational content, potential negative impacts on young viewers, and dubious age appropriateness in light of regulations on children's television programming in the United States. According to filings made in accordance with FCC rules, the target age of New School is 8–11 years old.

The series was criticized in a 2007 survey by Children's Media Policy Coalition (CMPC), an advocacy group made up of member organizations Children Now, the American Academy of Pediatrics, the Benton Foundation, the National PTA, and Office of Communication of the United Church of Christ. The CMPC's survey of 25 shows identified New School as one of 17 that "contained only social-emotional messages" without any academic or informational content. The report judged the moral messages in New School to be unsuccessful, as the characters either fail to learn the ostensible lessons or learn them only on a superficial level, without any meaningful reason or corresponding character development. While analyzing the episode "Officer Kronk", the CMPC noted that "Kuzco never has to face a personal conflict or find a resolution, nor are there any real repercussions for Kuzco's anti-social behavior (other than his eventual loneliness)." A reply from the National Association of Broadcasters criticized the CMPC's findings as "unabashedly subjective".

In a 2008 report for Children Now by communication professor Barbara Wilson and her colleagues, New School was among 30 television programs surveyed because they were supposed to contain "educational or informational for preschoolers, elementary-school kids and teenagers as part of federal 'core educational programming' requirements". According to the report, the characters in New School displayed some of the highest levels of social aggression, which the report defined as "any behavior designed to harm an animate being's self-esteem or social status," including "derisive name-calling, socially ostracizing someone, gossiping, and spreading hurtful rumors." It was one of three series deemed to have high levels of social aggression, alongside Hannah Montana and Jacob Two-Two. Wilson noted that, in principle, a children's series could highlight characters who exhibit socially aggressive behaviors to teach children to avoid such behavior, but she doubted whether that message would be adequately conveyed by shows with repeated instances of social aggression, which would be "far more likely" to feature such content "for laughs and to entertain".

The show's values as an educational resource has also been assessed in light of its historical setting. Common Sense Media found that it represented a missed opportunity because "despite the potentially interesting and educational setting (an Incan empire), there's no learning about history or the culture of these people." Conversely, a review in a Spanish journal of pedagogy found that the series provided an opportunity to introduce students to topics like the cultures and peoples of the pre-Columbian era, as well as the subsequent period of European colonization of the Americas.

Malina became a subject of criticism from a feminist perspective. Bustle's Kadeen Griffiths wrote that her role as Kuzco's love interest was sexist, particularly his frequent and overt objectification of her as a "hottie hot hottie", but also noted she had a greater degree of "depth and focus" than most other cartoon love interests. MacPherson criticized the series for including only two prominent female characters, Yzma and Malina, and said the latter's figure-hugging clothing indicated that her intelligence was "clearly secondary" to her attractiveness.

=== Awards and nominations ===
New School received several awards and nominations. For her performance of the character Yzma, Kitt won two Annie Awards for Outstanding Voice Acting in a Television Production and two Daytime Emmy Awards for Outstanding Performer in an Animated Program. Warburton received a nomination for the same Annie Award as Kitt in 2007, while DiCicco was nominated alongside Kitt for the Daytime Emmy in 2008. Parkins was nominated for an Annie Award for Outstanding Directing in a Television Production in 2008 for his work on the episode "The Emperor's New School Musical".

Award	Year of ceremony	Nominee	Category	Result	Ref.
Annie Awards	2007	Eartha Kitt (for "Kuzclone")	Outstanding Voice Acting in an Animated Television Production	Won	
Annie Awards	2007	Patrick Warburton (for "Kuzclone")	Outstanding Voice Acting in an Animated Television Production	Nominated	
Annie Awards	2008	Eartha Kitt (for "The Emperor's New School Musical")	Outstanding Voice Acting in a Television Production	Won	
Annie Awards	2008	Howy Parkins (for "The Emperor's New School Musical")	Outstanding Directing in a Television Production	Nominated	
Daytime Emmy Award	2007	Eartha Kitt	Outstanding Performer in an Animated Program	Won	
Daytime Emmy Award	2008	Eartha Kitt	Outstanding Performer in an Animated Program	Won	
Daytime Emmy Award	2008	Jessica DiCicco	Outstanding Performer in an Animated Program	Nominated	
