= The Chestnut Tree =

The Chestnut Tree is a short film which made its debut at the Laemmle Sunset 5 and then showed in the Austin Film Festival and the San Diego Asian Film Festival. It is a 2-D hand-drawn short film about a little girl and her mother that revisit memories under the chestnut tree. It is animated by Hyun-min Lee.

== Reception ==
It was nominated for two Annie Awards, for Best Animated Short Subject and Animation Production Artist in the 35th Annual Annie Awards.
