= Tisha Terrasini Banker =

American actress

- Occupation: Actress

Tisha Terrasini Banker is an American actress.

== Career ==
Banker has appeared in numerous plays in various cities, including The Idiot Box, Because They Have No Words, The Book of Liz, Midsummer Night's Dream, and Playhouse Creatures. On television, her credits include roles on Criminal Minds, Sleeper Cell, and Joey. As a voice actress, she voiced Miss Ni in The Emperor's New School and Aurora Soleil in Duck Dodgers.

== Personal life ==
Banker is a sister of the Theta Phi Alpha fraternity.

== Filmography ==
=== Film ===
Year	Title	Role	Notes
2013	Chastity Bites	Newscaster	

=== Television ===
Year	Title	Role	Notes
2005	Duck Dodgers	Aurora Soleil (voice)	2 episodes
2006	Joey	Mary Videtti	Episode: "Joey and the Holding Hands"
2006	The Emperor's New School	Miss Ni (voice)	Episode: "Evil and Eviler"
2006	Criminal Minds	Jackie Powers	Episode: "P911"
2006	Sleeper Cell	CIA Woman	Episode: "Torture"
2008	Dirty Sexy Money	Press #1	Episode: "The Family Lawyer"
2008	Leverage	News Reporter	Episode: "The Homecoming Job"
2009	Raising the Bar	ER Doctor	Episode: "Is There a Doctor in the House?"
2009	Anatomy of Hope	Katie Mohr	Television film
2013	Welcome to the Family	Woman	Episode: "Molly and Junior Find a Place"
2014	Growing Up Fisher	Teacher	Episode: "Pilot"
2014	Beware the Batman	Ava Kirk, Gloria Pearce (voice)	2 episodes
2014–2015	Pretty the Series	Diana	4 episodes
2018	Forever	Flight Attendant	Episode: "June"
