= Joey Lawrence (album) =

Studio album by Joey Lawrence
- Released: February 2, 1993
- Genre: Pop
- Length: 50:20
- Label: Impact/MCA
- Producers: Steve Barri; Eric Beall; Vassal Benford; Steve Diamond; Alexandra Forbes; Jud J. Friedman; Axel Kroell; Jim Lang; Tony Peluso; Nathaniel Phillips; Ian Prince; Richard Scher; Elliot Wolff

Joey Lawrence chronology
Joey Lawrence (1993)	Soulmates (1997)

Joey Lawrence is the debut album by American singer and actor Joey Lawrence, released on February 2, 1993, on MCA Records. It features a total of three singles; the biggest of which, the Lawrence co-written "Nothin' My Love Can't Fix", reached number 19 on the Billboard Hot 100.

== Critical reception ==
Professional ratings
Review scores
Source	Rating
AllMusic	3/5 stars
Music Week	3/5 stars

The Chicago Tribune noted that, "like the decades-ago albums of Cassidy, Leif Garrett, et al., this one is chock full of swoony songs, top-notch production and whatever else they can throw in to make it as faddish as possible."

== Track listing ==
1. "I Can't Help Myself" (Axel Kroell; Mark Holden; Michael Price) – 4:24
2. "Nothin' My Love Can't Fix" (Joey Lawrence; Alexandra Forbes; Eric Beall) – 4:03
3. "Stay Forever" (Joey Lawrence; Ariel Shallit; Art Lafrentz Bacon; Nicholas Bacon) – 4:18
4. "Justa 'Nother Love Song" (Joey Lawrence; Michael Price; Richard Scher; Terry Lupton) – 4:20
5. "Night by Night" (Richard Scher; Steve Diamond) – 4:19
6. "I Like the Way (Kick da Smoove Groove)" (Joey Lawrence; Ariel Shallit; Lafrentz Bacon, Arthur) – 4:18
7. "In These Times" (Joey Lawrence; Elliot Wolff) – 4:17
8. "Anything for Love" (Ronald Spearman; Vassal Benford) – 4:04
9. "My Girl" (Joey Lawrence; Elliot Wolff) – 3:25
10. "Where Does That Leave Me" (Joey Lawrence; Allan Rich; Jud J. Friedman) – 4:46
11. "The Ways of Love" (Joey Lawrence; Ian Prince) – 4:33
12. "Read My Eyes" (Joey Lawrence; Russ Faith) – 3:26

== Personnel ==
- Joey Lawrence – main vocal
- Maxi Anderson, Liz Constantine, Joey Diggs, Jim Gilstrap, Julia Waters, Oren Waters, Maxine Waters, Terry Wood, Monalisa Young, Terry Young – backing vocals
- Steve Skinner – keyboards and programming
- Jim Lang – keyboards
- Steve Diamond, Dean Parks, Sheldon Reynolds – guitars
- Nathaniel Phillips – keyboards, drums
- Richard Scher – drums
- Ronald Spearman – percussion
- Richard Elliott, Dave Koz – saxophone

== Production ==
- Produced by Steve Barri (1-6, 12), Eric Beall (2), Vassal Benford (8), Steve Diamond (5), Alexandra Forbes (2), Jud J. Friedman (10), Axel Kroell (1), Tony Peluso (1-6, 12), Ian Prince (11), Richard Scher (4, 5) Elliot Wolff (7, 9), Randy Nicklaus (additional production on 10), Joey Lawrence (3, associate producer on 12), Pat O'Conner (associate producer on 12), Julie Barri (assistant on 3)
- Associate producers – Julie Barri, Joey Lawrence, Randy Nicklaus
- Engineers – Ted Blaisdell, Martin Brass, Phil Brown, Jim Lang, Tony Peluso, Richard Scher, Joe "Gruvtek" Seta, Fred Tenny, Elliot Wolff
- Assistant engineers – Benny Mouthon, Axel Nielhaus
- Mixing – Ted Blaisdell, Victor Flores, Steve Peck, Tony Peluso
- Mix assistant – Fred Kelly
- Mastering – Steve Hall

== Charts ==
Chart (1993)	Peak position
Australian Albums (ARIA)	191
Canadian Albums (RPM)	25
UK Albums Chart	39
US Billboard 200	74
