= Joey Lawrence =

American actor, musician, singer-songwriter, record producer, and game show host

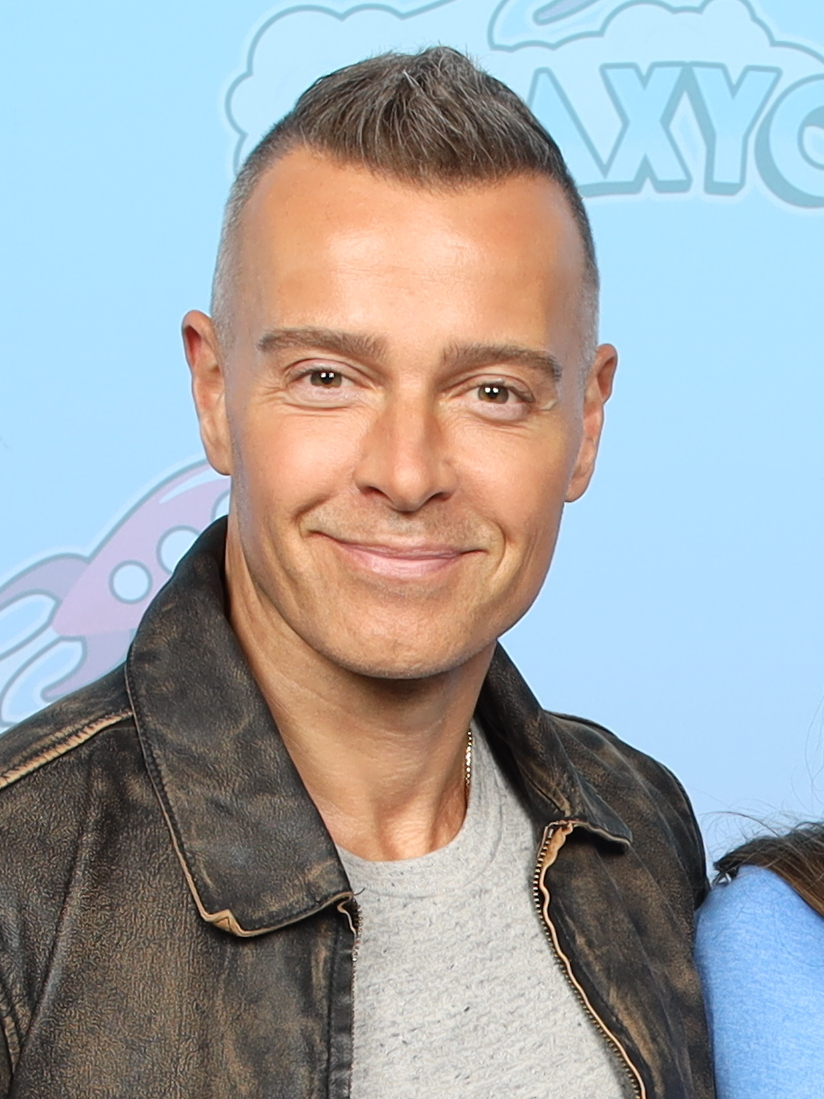
- Lawrence at GalaxyCon Richmond in 2024
- Born: Joseph Lawrence Mignogna III; April 20, 1976 (age 50); Abington Township, Montgomery County, Pennsylvania, U.S.
- Other names: Joseph Lawrence, Joey Lawrence
- Education: Abington Friends School (1994); University of Southern California
- Occupations: Actor; musician; singer-songwriter; record producer; game show host
- Years active: 1981–present
- Spouses: Michelle Vella (m. 2002; div. 2005) Chandie Yawn-Nelson (m. 2005; div. 2022) Samantha Cope (m. 2022)
- Children: 4
- Relatives: Matthew Lawrence (brother); Andrew Lawrence (brother)

Joseph Lawrence Mignogna III (born April 20, 1976) is an American actor, musician, singer-songwriter, record producer, podcaster, and game show host. He was a child actor in the early 1980s and portrayed Joey Russo in Blossom (1991–95) and Joe Longo in Melissa & Joey (2010–15). Lawrence also starred in Gimme a Break! (1983–87) and the series Brotherly Love with his real-life brothers Matthew and Andrew. His film appearances include Summer Rental (1985) and Oliver & Company (1988).

== Early life ==
Lawrence was born on April 20, 1976, and raised in Abington Township, Montgomery County, Pennsylvania, a suburb of Philadelphia. He is the eldest son of Donna Lynn (née Shaw), a personnel manager and former elementary school teacher, and Joseph Lawrence Mignogna Jr., an insurance broker. He is of Italian and British descent. His family's surname was changed to "Lawrence" during his childhood when he started acting. He has two younger brothers, actors Matthew and Andrew.

Lawrence graduated from Abington Friends School in Jenkintown, Pennsylvania, in 1994 and later attended the University of Southern California film school.

== Career ==
=== Acting ===
In 1981, when he was five years old, Lawrence landed his first acting role in a Cracker Jack commercial. Three weeks before turning age six, he appeared on the March 31, 1982, episode of The Tonight Show Starring Johnny Carson, where he performed the song "Give My Regards to Broadway" and tap danced.

After appearing in guest spots on Diff'rent Strokes and Silver Spoons, Lawrence won the role of Joey Donovan on the hit NBC sitcom Gimme a Break! in 1983. He continued in that role until the series ended in 1987. 1985 marked Lawrence's theatrical debut with the release of Summer Rental. Lawrence provided the voice of Oliver, the protagonist in the animated 1988 Disney film Oliver & Company at the age of 12. From 1991, at the age of 15, to 1995, Lawrence co-starred in the hit TV series Blossom on NBC, playing Joey Russo.

Lawrence has also starred in the series Brotherly Love (which featured his real-life brothers, Matthew and Andrew Lawrence) and Run of the House and has guest starred on such programs as American Dreams and CSI: NY. One of Lawrence's film credits is Urban Legends: Final Cut (2000).

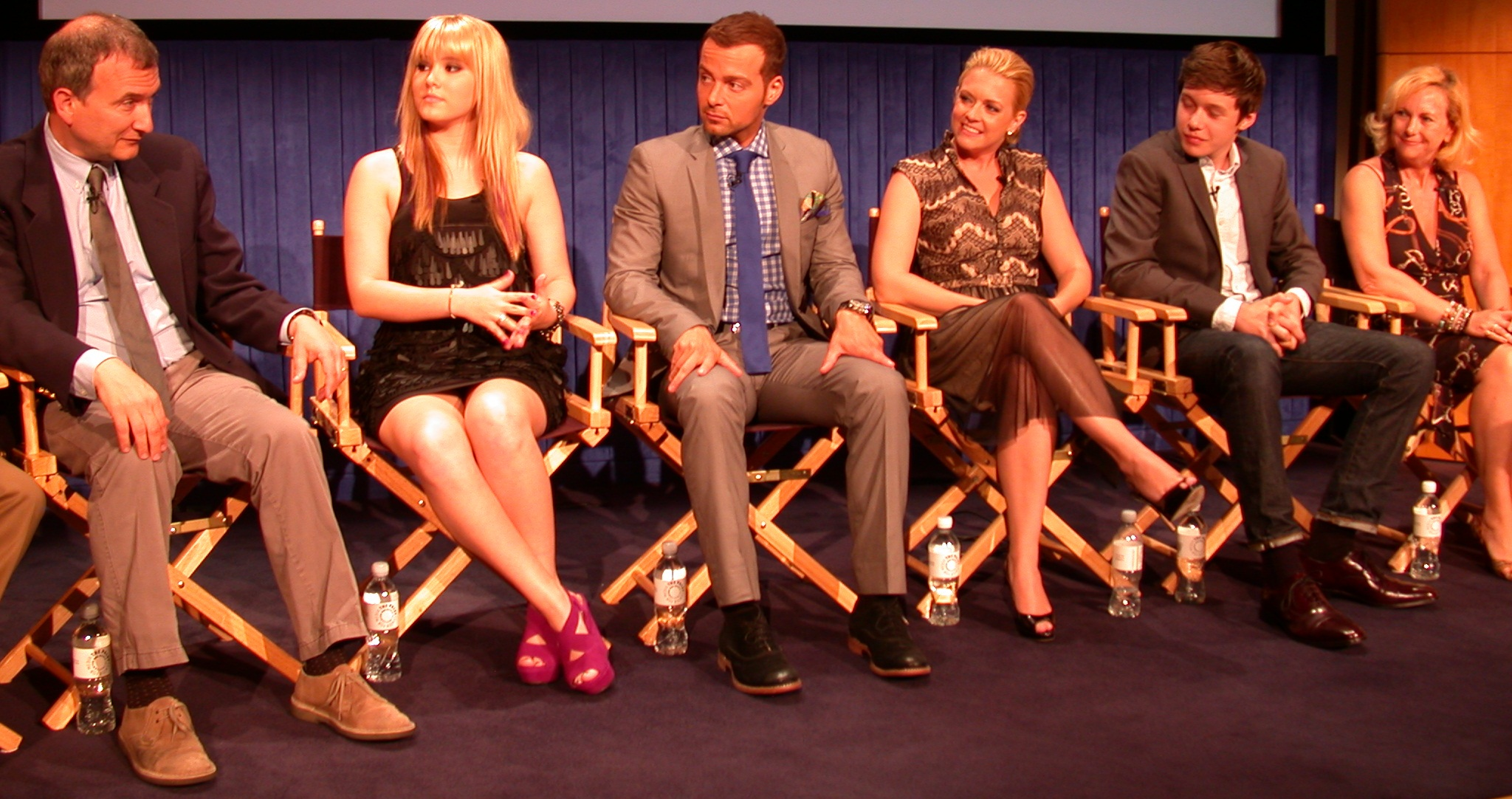
Lawrence with the cast of Melissa & Joey

In 2006, Lawrence appeared on ABC's Dancing with the Stars. Paired with professional dancer Edyta Śliwińska, he placed third in the competition.

In May 2007, he starred in the Broadway hit Chicago as Billy Flynn. He next hosted a dance competition show on TLC, Master of Dance, which premiered June 9, 2008.

In 2009, Lawrence starred in the television film My Fake Fiancé with Melissa Joan Hart, which premiered on ABC Family with 3.6 million viewers, becoming the most-watched television film the rating season, sweeping top rank in its time period in key demos. In August 2010, Lawrence returned to television in the ABC Family sitcom Melissa & Joey, again opposite Hart. Hart plays a woman who hires Lawrence as a nanny to help care for her incarcerated sister's kids. Lawrence's character is a former figure in the financial industry whose company came under investigation for wrongdoing and caused his professional life to be put on hold. Lawrence's brothers guest-starred on the show. Matthew Lawrence played Tony Longo in season 1 episode 25 and Andrew Lawrence appeared in season 1 episode 26 as Ryder Scanlon's teacher, Evan McKay. The series was renewed for its fourth season and ended in 2015.

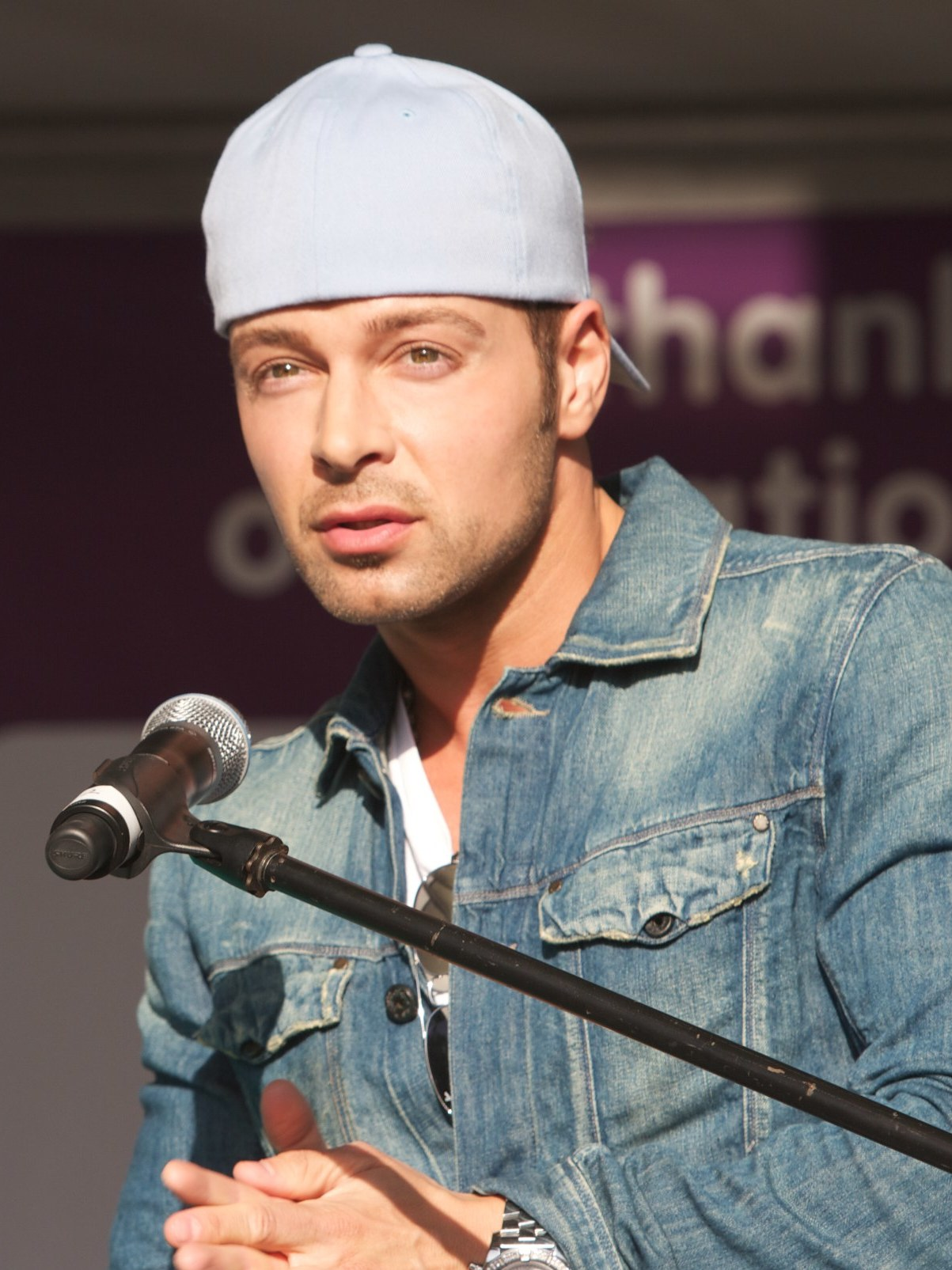
Lawrence in 2011 at March of Dimes

In 2012, he was contracted to be a Chippendales dancer for a special engagement in June at the Rio All-Suite Hotel and Casino in Las Vegas. On March 19, 2013, Lawrence began appearing in the ABC reality show Splash, co-hosting alongside Charissa Thompson.

In 2022, Lawrence competed in season eight of The Masked Singer as "Walrus". He was eliminated on "90s Night" alongside Le'Veon Bell as "Milkshake".

In August 2023, Lawrence resurfaced his Blossom catchphrase, "Whoa!", by starring in a VinFast's VF8 ad campaign, covered by Automotive News and Ad Age. In December of the same year, Lawrence reprised his role in a second installment of VinFast's "Changing Lanes" campaign.

In 2025, Lawrence co-created the graphic novel The Lawrence Brothers Detective Agency alongside his brothers Matthew Lawrence and Andrew Lawrence, and writers Ben Berkowitz and Max Berkowitz, known as the Berkowitz Brothers. The project, published by Z2 Comics with artwork by Sean Von Gorman, reimagines the brothers as fictional detectives in a story inspired by The Hardy Boys, Scooby-Doo, and 1990s pop culture. The graphic novel releases in September 2026.

=== Music career ===
Lawrence has stated that music was always his passion, and at the height of his success began a recording career. Lawrence was 16 when his debut album Joey Lawrence was released in February 1993. It was produced by Steve Barri, Tony Peluso, Terry Lupton, and Ian Prince. Lawrence co-wrote some material, including the international hit single "Nothin' My Love Can't Fix" (#6 Billboard Hot 100 Airplay, No. 10 Billboard Top 40 Mainstream, No. 19 Billboard Hot 100, No. 13 United Kingdom, No. 68 Australia). The song was used as the end-title theme for the film Cop and a Half; its music video received heavy airplay on MTV and Canadian MuchMusic, and Lawrence was invited to perform live on MTV Spring Break, The Arsenio Hall Show, and BBC's Top of the Pops in 1993.

In June 2011, he released a single, "Rolled", which was available as a free download for one week on ABC Family's website. In July, Lawrence released a second single, "Give It to Ya (Acoustic)" via Pledge Music. In 2017, Lawrence started a band with Matt and Andy called Still 3. They released their debut single "Lose Myself".

=== Podcasting ===
In 2023, Joey launched a podcast called "Brotherly Love Podcast" with his brothers Andrew and Matthew. It was launched through PodCo, a podcast studio launched by former Disney Channel actress Christy Carlson Romano and focused on rewatches of completed television series by their former actors.

== Personal life ==
Lawrence married Michelle Vella in 2002, but divorced in 2005.

He originally met his second wife, Chandie Yawn-Nelson at Walt Disney World when the two were teenagers. They later wed there in July 2005, and have two daughters together. Reports surfaced in March 2018 that Lawrence and Yawn-Nelson had filed for bankruptcy in July 2017. On April 6, 2018, the Chapter 7 bankruptcy case was reportedly settled. Lawrence filed for divorce in July 2020. Their divorce was finalized in February 2022.

In 2022, Lawrence married actress Samantha Cope whom he met on the set of the Lifetime television film A Deadly Deed, directed by his brother Andrew and co-starring his daughter Charleston. The couple has one daughter, born in 2023. On August 13, 2024, Cope filed for divorce. In December 2024, it was announced that the couple had reconciled and had their divorce filing dismissed. The couple had a second child, a son born in 2026.

== Filmography ==
=== Film ===
Year	Title	Role	Notes
1985	Summer Rental	Bobby Chester	
1988	Pulse	David Rockland	
1988	Oliver & Company	Oliver	Voice role
1991	Chains of Gold	Tommy	
1994	Radioland Murders	Frankie Marshall	
1995	A Goofy Movie	Chad	Voice role
1999	Tequila Body Shots	Johnny Orpheus	
2000	Urban Legends: Final Cut	Graham Manning	
2000	Desperate But Not Serious	Darby	
2001	Do You Wanna Know a Secret?	Hank Ford	
2001	A Christmas Adventure ...From a Book Called Wisely's Tales	Wolfpack Leader	Direct to video film; voice role
2002	Trois 2: Pandora's Box	Det. Anderson	
2006	Rest Stop	Officer Michael Deacon	Direct to video film
2008	Killer Pad	Joey Lawrence	
2008	Together Again for the First Time	Carey Krzyznyk	Direct to video film
2010	Sinatra Club	Louie 'Pipes' Pepitone	
2011	Hit List	Lyle	
2016	Saved by Grace	Rick	
2016	Emma's Chance	Kevin Chambers	
2016	Arlo: The Burping Pig	David	
2016	Isle of the Dead	Lt. Paul Gibson	
2017	Girl Followed	Jim	
2018	Sk8 Dawg	Mr. Hoffman	
2019	Roe v. Wade	Robert Byrn	
2020	Money Plane	The Concierge	
2020	My Brother's Keeper	Preach	
2020	Pardoned by Grace	Scott Highberger	
2020	The Office Mix-Up	Mikey	
2021	Mistletoe Mixup	Tom	
2023	Frankie Meets Jack	Jack Shaw	Also writer and executive producer
2024	Marry Christmas	Tom Wright	Also executive producer

=== Television ===
Year	Title	Role	Notes
1982	Scamps	Sparky	Television film
1982	Diff'rent Strokes	Joey	Episode: "Big Brother"
1982	Silver Spoons	Joey Thompson	Episode: "The Best Christmas Ever"
1983	Little Shots	Pete	Television film
1983	Wait till Your Mother Gets Home!	Chris Peters	Television film
1983–1987	Gimme a Break!	Joey Donovan	Main role
1984	Young People's Specials	Billy	Episode: "Umbrella Jack"
1985	ABC Afterschool Special	Mattie	Episode: "Don't Touch"
1989	Adventures in Babysitting	Brad Anderson	Unsold TV pilot
1990–1995	Blossom	Joey Russo	Main role
1993	Olsen Twins Mother's Day Special	Singer	TV special
1993	Almost Home	Jeff Thornton	Episode: "Girls and Boy"
1993	Empty Nest	Wade	Episode: "Aunt Verne Knows Best"
1995	The John Larroquette Show	Carly's Brother	Episode: "Whipping Post"
1995	Something Wilder	J.J. Travis	Episode: "Bergman of Alcatraz"
1995	Prince for a Day	Ralph Bitondo / Ricky Prince	Television film
1995	Wheel of Fortune	Himself	Episode #2398: Celebrity Week
1995–1997	Brotherly Love	Joe Roman	Main role
1996	Brothers of the Frontier	Ethan Frye	Television film
1999	Touched by an Angel	Jesse	Episode: "Fool for Love"
1999	Horse Sense	Michael Woods	Television film; also co-producer
1999	Recess	Franklin Dudikoff	Voice role; episode: "The Dude"
2001	Jumping Ship	Michael Woods	Television film
2002	Romantic Comedy 101	Mark Gibson	Television film
2002	The Zeta Project	Dex Finley	Voice role; episode: "Eye of the Storm"
2002–2003	American Dreams	Michael Brooks	Recurring role
2003–2004	Run of the House	Kurt Franklin	Main role
2004	Love Rules!	Michael Warner	Television film
2005	Bow	Matt	Television film
2005	Confessions of a Sociopathic Social Climber	Ferguson	Television film
2005–2006	Half & Half	Brett Mahoney	Recurring role
2006	Android Apocalypse	DeeCee	Television film
2007	CSI: NY	Clay Dobson	3 episodes
2007–2008	The Emperor's New School	Dirk Brock	Voice role
2009	My Fake Fiancé	Vince	Television film
2010–2015	Melissa & Joey	Joe Longo	Main role
2011	Celebrity Ghost Stories	Self	Episode: Jan 1, 2011
2011	The Dog Who Saved Halloween	Zeus	Television film
2012	Hitched for the Holidays	Rob Marino	Television film
2012	The Dog Who Saved the Holidays	Zeus	Television film
2013	Splash	Himself	Co-host
2015	Celebrity Family Feud	Himself	Episode: "Lawrence vs Lopez"
2016	Cupcake Wars	Himself	Contestant: runner-up
2017–2019	Hawaii Five-0	Aaron Wright	4 episodes
2018	A Mother's Worst Fear	Brent	Television film
2019	Celebrity Big Brother	Himself	Contestant / Houseguest: 9th place
2019	Dollface	Himself	Episode: "Mystery Brunette"
2021	Danger Force	Himself	Episode: "Vidja Games"
2021	My Husband's Secret Brother	Kevin	Television film
2022	Call Me Kat	Himself	
2022	The Masked Singer	Himself/Walrus	Season 8 contestant; Episode: "90s Night"
2023	Love by Design	Hal Hartley	UP TV Movie
2026	Totally 90s House	Himself	Contestant (replacement for Melissa Joan Hart)

=== Dancing with the Stars ===
Week #	Dance / Song	Judges' scores			Result
Week #	Dance / Song	Inaba	Goodman	Tonioli	Result
1	Cha-Cha-Cha / "I Like the Way (You Move)"	7	7	7	Safe
2	Quickstep / "I Got Rhythm"	10	9	10	Safe
3	Jive / "Blue Suede Shoes"	8	6	8	Safe
4	Waltz / "Take It to the Limit"	9	9	9	Safe
5	Samba / "Freedom! '90"	8	8	9	Safe
6	Rumba / "Father Figure"	8	8	8	Bottom two
6	Group Disco / "Don't Stop 'Til You Get Enough"	No scores given			Bottom two
7	Foxtrot / "Singin' in the Rain"	10	9	10	Safe
7	Mambo / "Mambo No. 5"	9	9	10	Safe
8 Semi-finals	Tango / "The Addams Family Theme"	10	9	9	Safe
8 Semi-finals	Paso Doble / "Sympathy for the Devil"	9	8	9	Safe
9 Finals	Quickstep / "42nd Street"	9	10	10	Third place
9 Finals	Rumba / "Eternal Flame"	10	10	10	Third place

== Commercial ==
- VinFast: "Whoa" - VinFast VF8 "Changing Lanes" Campaign (US Debut, August 2023)
- VinFast: "Whoa 2"- VinFast VF8 "Changing Lanes" Campaign (US, December 2023)

== Theater ==
- Chicago (2007) as Billy Flynn (replacement)

== Discography ==
=== Studio albums ===
Title	Album details	Peak positions			
Title	Album details	US	AUS	CAN	UK
Joey Lawrence	Released: February 2, 1993; Label: Impact/MCA	74	191	25	39
Soulmates	Released: September 16, 1997; Label: Curb	—	—	—	—

=== Extended plays ===
Title	Extended play details
Imagine	Released: August 28, 2017; Label: Entertainment A&R Media
Guilty	Released: February 10, 2022; Label: The Art of Loud Recordings

=== Singles ===
Year	Title	Peak positions					Album
Year	Title	US	AUS	CAN	IRE	UK	Album
1993	"Nothin' My Love Can't Fix"	19	68	50	22	13	Joey Lawrence
1993	"I Can't Help Myself"	—	—	—	—	27	Joey Lawrence
1993	"Stay Forever"	52	155	—	—	41	Joey Lawrence
1997	"Ven Ven Conmigo"	—	—	—	—	—	Soulmates
1998	"Never Gonna Change My Mind"	—	—	—	—	49	Soulmates
2011	"Rolled"	—	—	—	—	—	Non-album single
2011	"Give It to Ya" (acoustic)	—	—	—	—	—	Guilty
2013	"Our Time"	—	—	—	—	—	Non-album single
2017	"Girl"	—	—	—	—	—	Imagine
2017	"Imagine"	—	—	—	—	—	Imagine
2017	"Christmas Time"	—	—	—	—	—	Non-album singles
2021	"Turtle"	—	—	—	—	—	Non-album singles
2021	"Something Special"	—	—	—	—	—	Guilty
2021	"Give It to Ya"	—	—	—	—	—	Guilty
2021	"Under the Tree"	—	—	—	—	—	Non-album single
2022	"Guilty"	—	—	—	—	—	Guilty
