= Beverly Hills, 90210 season 8 =

Beverly Hills, 90210
- Season 8
- DVD cover
- Starring: Jason Priestley Jennie Garth Ian Ziering Brian Austin Green Tori Spelling Tiffani-Amber Thiessen Joe E. Tata Hilary Swank Vincent Young
- No. of episodes: 32

Release
- Original network: Fox
- Original release: September 10, 1997 – May 20, 1998

Season chronology
- ← Previous; Season 7 Next → Season 9

The eighth season of Beverly Hills, 90210, is an American drama television series aired from September 10, 1997, on FOX and concluded on May 20, 1998, after 32 episodes. This season follows the gang after college and into adulthood as they struggle with issues such as terrible working conditions, rape allegations, relationships, infidelity, self-harm, sexual harassment, shootings, amnesia, parenthood, drug abuse, prostitution, homosexual rights, child molestation, and crime.

The eighth season aired Wednesday nights at 8/9c and was released on DVD in 2009.

== Overview ==
The gang after college and into adulthood as they cope with a variety of challenges that adults encounter in their personal and professional life, such as awful working conditions, rape allegations, romances, infidelity, sexual harassment, shootings, amnesia, motherhood, drug abuse, prostitution, homosexual rights, depression, peer pressure and crime. With college over, Brandon, Kelly, Donna, David, Steve, Val, and two newbies Noah and Carly are realizing that life after graduation is not as simple as they had imagined.

== Cast ==
=== Starring ===
- Jason Priestley as Brandon Walsh
- Jennie Garth as Kelly Taylor
- Ian Ziering as Steve Sanders
- Brian Austin Green as David Silver
- Tori Spelling as Donna Martin
- Tiffani Thiessen as Valerie Malone
- Joe E. Tata as Nat Bussichio
- Hilary Swank as Carly Reynolds (episodes 1–17)
- Vincent Young as Noah Hunter

=== Recurring ===
- Lindsay Price as Janet Sosna
- Myles Jeffrey as Zach Reynolds
- Fatima Lowe as Terri Spar
- George DelHoyo as Gary Monahan
- Paul Popowich as Jasper McQuade
- Angel Boris as Emma Bennett
- Christopher Orr as Cooper Hargrove
- Michael Reilly Burke as Jeff Stockmann
- Brandi Andres as Sarah Edmunds
- Nicole Forester as Jill Reiter

=== Notable guest stars ===
- Gabrielle Carteris as Andrea Zuckerman
- James Eckhouse as Jim Walsh
- Carol Potter as Cindy Walsh

== Episodes ==
No. overall	No. in season	Title	Directed by	Written by	Original release date	Prod. code	U.S. viewers (millions)
209	1	"Aloha Beverly Hills"	Bethany Rooney	Michael Braverman	September 10, 1997	2197203A	13.99
210	2	"Aloha Beverly Hills"	Bethany Rooney	Michael Braverman	September 10, 1997	2197203B	13.99
The gang has trouble finding work after graduating from college. Steve accepts a position as alumni representative for his fraternity (for a dollar a year). Valerie runs through a series of odd jobs, including a department store perfume sample girl. She tries to convince David to let her manage the club; although the After Dark is in dire straits, he turns her down. David refuses to move in with Donna until she reveals the true nature of their relationship to her mother. Steve alienates Carly Reynolds, the single mother of one of Erin's soccer teammates. She gets fired from her waitress job after a run-in with Steve and his date. Brandon and Kelly struggle to adjust to their new living arrangement. They decide to relax by taking a Hawaiian vacation, although Kelly doesn't want to postpone her new job. Donna seeks work as a second assistant for a designer, and winds up as the woman's only assistant. She is asked to help with a photo shoot in Hawaii, so everyone decides to take a vacation. Kelly backs out of the trip after catching Brandon repeatedly looking at old photos of Tracy. Donna's boss becomes ill and asks her to coordinate the photo shoot. The event proves to be an unmitigated disaster, and the photographer berates Donna by accusing her for ruining the shoot. Noah Hunter, a male model participating in the shoot, defends Donna; he also responds to an insult by punching the photographer. Donna's boss takes the blame for forcing her to shoulder too much responsibility. Valerie spends the entire trip trying to get closer to Noah, although she is put off by the fact that he performs boat maintenance for a living. Brandon runs into Tracy and her new fiancé, a grad student at the University of Hawaii. Donna becomes unnerved when Brandon and Tracy frolic and play in the water. She places an emergency call to Kelly, who immediately flies over from L.A. Kelly is embarrassed after learning that Tracy is engaged. During a hike, David slips off some rocks and crashes into the water. Noah and Brandon dive in to rescue him, and David receives treatment for his injuries. Noah decides to return to Los Angeles with the gang, as he has an offer to work on a boat. Donna suggests that he stay on her parents' boat. The gang arrives at the L.A. airport late at night, and Brandon finds that his car has a flat tire. He insists on changing it immediately, rather than getting a ride from the others. Brandon confronts two men who are stealing a car nearby. They drive away, but come back to the lot and start shooting. Kelly catches a bullet in the abdomen. Hilary Swank and Vincent Young join the cast as Carly Reynolds and Noah Hunter. Young does not appear in the first episode, and Swank and Joe E. Tata do not appear in the second episode.
211	3	"Forgive and Forget"	David Semel	John Eisendrath	September 17, 1997	2197204	13.70
Kelly undergoes successful surgery and begins to recover from her injuries. Brandon picks the shooter out of a police lineup. Kelly suffers complications and must undergo surgery for a blood clot in her lungs. She wakes up with amnesia. Donna gets a job as a personal shopper for a designer. She tells her mother that David is going to move in with her. Naturally, Felice is not thrilled by the news. Noah and Valerie sleep together, but he has second thoughts the following morning. Carly reconsiders her opinion of Steve after he gets her a job at the Peach Pit. He declares himself to be a sports agent and tries to woo the star of the C.U. women's basketball team. Carly sees Steve with his client and gets the wrong idea. This episode features a special appearance by Kara's Flowers, later known as Maroon 5.
212	4	"The Way We Weren't"	Frank Thackery	Michael Cassutt	September 24, 1997	2197205	11.28
Brandon is heartbroken when Kelly is unable to remember their relationship. Kelly develops a crush on Noah, whose blood donation saved her life. Noah takes Kelly for a stroll on the beach, and she regains some of her memories. Brandon confronts Noah and warns him to stay away from Kelly. The identity of Kelly's shooter comes under scrutiny because the man Brandon picked out did not have gun residue on his hands. Brandon considers a job offer from the Seattle Times. Steve's career as a sports agent comes to an end after he nearly puts Charlotte's career in jeopardy with an illegal gift. Rush gives Steve his own business, a defunct newspaper. Steve wants Brandon to be his editor, but he initially turns him down. Brandon accepts Steve's offer so that he can write, yet remain close to Kelly. Donna panics when she loses her boss's beloved dog en route to the veterinarian. Valerie helps organize Donna when she has trouble keeping track of her clients. Donna decides to make Val her business partner.
213	5	"Coming Home"	Georg Fenady	Laurie McCarthy	October 1, 1997	2197206	11.14
Kelly moves back into the beach apartment. Noah advises her to concentrate on her relationship with Brandon. She follows his advice, but becomes frustrated when she still cannot remember her life with Brandon. Her memories finally return as she reads the first issue of Brandon and Steve's newspaper, The Beverly Beat. A designer offers to purchase Donna's work. As she walks out of the interview, she stumbles onto a sweatshop; a young girl has burned her arm while operating a steam press. Donna and Brandon decide to investigate the story. David manages a rock band and allows the lead singer to crash at the apartment. Donna is put off by the man's rude behavior, and overhears him making an anti-Semitic remark. Noah pushes Val away and admits that he is consumed by thoughts of another woman. Valerie follows him to a spot overlooking the city; he shares that his girlfriend died in a car accident at this location after Noah lost control of the vehicle. Wealthy client Cooper Hargrove shows an interest in Valerie. Steve tries to prove that he is responsible by babysitting Zach while Carly has a date.
214	6	"The Right Thing"	Chip Chalmers	Ken Stringer	October 15, 1997	2197207	10.94
Brandon and Donna discover that Rush owns the building that houses the sweatshop. Although Rush denies any knowledge of illegal activities, Brandon uncovers proof that he owns the clothing factory. Steve accuses Brandon of selling out his father to establish a reputation as an investigative reporter. The woman who spoke with Donna is fired, although she had not revealed anything. She decides to expose the miserable working conditions, prompting Steve to confront his father. Rush admits that he may have known what was going on, and promises to clean up his act. While conducting the investigation, Steve forgets a promise to take Zach to Magic Mountain. David and Donna are kept apart by their busy schedules. David's band, Cain Was Abel, continues to behave unprofessionally and make prejudicial remarks. David's credit problems escalate. Kelly fails to identify the shooter from the police lineup. This infuriates Brandon, who is certain that she picked out the right guy. Valerie fills in for Donna while she looks into the sweatshops, and speaks ill of her to the clients. Cooper continues to woo Valerie, who acts against her better judgment and convinces Noah to pass up a job that would take him back to Hawaii.
215	7	"Pride and Prejudice"	Harvey Frost	Rich Cooper	October 22, 1997	2197208	11.24
Brandon becomes overly protective of Kelly and displays behavior that borders on the sociopathic. When a man accidentally bumps into Kelly at a movie theater, Brandon imagines gun shots and attacks him. Detective Woods tells Brandon that the guy who shot Kelly is in the hospital. Brandon arrives and learns that the shooter is the man that Kelly described; the guy Brandon identified is the driver, who has been arrested. Brandon makes menacing remarks to the shooter's dead body. David negotiates a record deal for Cain Was Abel. Donna shows him the band's new song, which includes racial slurs and encourages white supremacy. The record company executive tells David to let it go, but he refuses to allow the band to perform a showcase at the After Dark. David fights with the band when it tries to take the stage anyway. Donna learns that Valerie stole all of her clients. She tries to get revenge by asking Noah to work at a party in the hopes that he will catch Val with Cooper. Valerie manages to squirm out of the situation. Donna slaps Val during an argument at the club. Steve surprises Carly by doing all of her household chores, then takes her out for the evening. She is touched by his gesture and gives him a kiss. Joe E. Tata does not appear in this episode.
216	8	"Toil and Trouble"	Richard Denault	Elle Triedman	October 29, 1997	2197209	11.36
An unenthusiastic Noah discusses his investment portfolio with a business manager. He covers by telling Valerie that the man was a boat owner. Val accepts an invitation to a ball from Cooper and tries to keep Noah away. He shows up to surprise her; both men get mad and dump Valerie. The building owner evicts David for failing to pay the club's rent. He steals a check from Donna and forges her name. Donna takes a job for a woman who she believes is the widow of a major fashion designer. The woman seeks her help in retaining a psychic to ask her dead husband about some hidden jewels. David angers Donna by skipping the ball. Steve escorts Carly to the event, although they have to leave early to tend to an ailing Zach. Kelly fears that she and Brandon are in a rut, so they do it at every conceivable opportunity. As they are perceived as a routine couple.
217	9	"Friends, Lovers and Children"	Michael Ray Rhodes	John Whelpley	November 5, 1997	2197210	13.33
Brandon and Kelly recognize a hooker on a downtown street as Dylan's sister Erica. They call Brenda and learn that Erica vanished after following a boyfriend from Hawaii to Los Angeles. Brandon pays a male prostitute to lead them to Erica, and he and Kelly move her into the house. After convincing Valerie that she can be trusted alone, Erica disappears with all of the gang's valuables. David turns to a loan shark for help with his money problems. Donna discovers that David forged her name on a check. Torn apart by David's deceitful actions, she dumps him and throws him out of the apartment. Steve feels uncomfortable when Zach tricks him into participating in a father-son soccer game. Steve apologizes to Carly for overreacting, and they spend the night together. A woman whom Steve dated over the summer shows up and claims that she is pregnant with his child. Noah refuses to accept Val's apology and resume their relationship. He gets very drunk and is arrested in a bar fight. Brandon bails him out, and Noah explains that it is the anniversary of the death of his fiance, Beth. He also reveals that he is a Harvard graduate, and that his family runs a Fortune 500 oil company. He has millions in his trust fund, but wants nothing to do with the money.
218	10	"Child of the Night"	Les Sheldon	John Eisendrath	November 12, 1997	2197211	12.96
Erica is arrested for prostitution and released into Kelly and Brandon's custody. Brandon writes a story about her, but promises to leave her name out of it. The assistant district attorney needs the name of Brandon's source to build a case against Erica's abusive pimp. Despite Kelly's objections, Brandon insists on protecting Erica from possible retribution. Erica stands up to Riggs and helps a friend get off the streets. The assistant district attorney threatens to send Brandon to jail unless he cooperates. Jodi claims that Steve is the only man who could have possibly fathered her child. He tries to convince her to give the baby up for adoption. Carly persuades Steve to take a paternity test. Mel helps David file for bankruptcy and pay back Donna, but he still owes a large debt to the loan shark. Donna spends the day on her parents' boat with Noah while David moves out of the apartment. Valerie catches Donna and Noah kissing and shares the news with David. Sands' thug beats up David for failing to pay back his loan, but Noah protects him from further harm. Noah secretly pays off David's debt.
219	11	"Deadline"	Jon Paré	Michael Cassutt	November 19, 1997	2197212	12.15
Brandon is arrested for obstructing justice. Erica agrees to participate in a sting operation so that Riggs can be arrested on another charge without her testimony. Riggs gets busted for buying drugs from an undercover cop, and the police pretend to arrest Erica so that he will not suspect her involvement. Iris transfers custody of Erica over to Dylan so that she can live with her brother. A dedicated doctor impresses Kelly when she takes Erica to his hectic clinic. Kelly asks for a transfer to the clinic, where she will help with administrative duties. David moves into the office at the After Dark and accidentally starts a fire. He has lost his insurance and cannot pay for repairs, so the landlord terminates his lease. Donna takes pity on David and asks him to move back into the apartment. He takes her up on her offer, only to see her kissing Noah on the porch after a date. Valerie visits Sands and learns that Noah paid off David's debt. She lashes out at Noah for lying to her, and forces him to come clean with Donna. David, already angered by Noah's actions, becomes even more furious when Noah reveals that he bought out the landlord. David refuses to manage the club for him. Steve reluctantly agrees to take responsibility if he is the father of Jodi's child. The paternity test comes back negative; Steve feels that Jodi betrayed him by concealing the fact that there was another possible father, but wishes her luck.
220	12	"Friends in Deed"	Richard Denault	Elle Triedman	December 3, 1997	2197213	11.52
Dr. Monahan's behavior unnerves Kelly as he checks out her injured shoulder. Brandon insists that Kelly simply felt strange about being examined by an acquaintance, but she later finds reason to believe that Monahan was hitting on her. Kelly suggests that Brandon seek out talented columnist Emma Bennett for the Beat. The woman immediately begins coming on to him. Valerie warns Noah that he may be in over his head trying to manage the After Dark. He comes to agree with her and offers her a job, despite Donna's objections. Felice expresses her disapproval of Donna's relationship with Noah. Hoping to correct Felice's misconceptions about him, Noah buys the Martins' boat for $325,000 in an auction. David takes a job at a clothing store, but quits after just a few days. Donna sees David and Valerie at the mall and becomes jealous. Val suggests that they pretend to date to drive a wedge between Donna and Noah. Steve and Carly have difficulty finding time alone. Carly's mother stuns her by announcing that she is leaving town with her new boyfriend.
221	13	"Comic Relief"	Chip Chalmers	John Lavachielli	December 10, 1997	2197214	14.03
Dr. Monahan makes inappropriate advances toward Kelly. When she confronts him, he claims that he has done nothing wrong and accuses her of immaturity. Brandon lies about his whereabouts to Kelly and spends the day with Emma. They kiss after he drives her home. After discovering Brandon's relationship with Kelly, Emma tries to get to him by writing columns about the situation. David begins working at a car wash and befriends a gay teenage co-worker. He tries to convince the boy's parents to take him back, as he is sleeping at the car wash. David and Valerie proceed with their plan to make their exes jealous. Donna becomes upset and throws David out of the apartment, forcing him to move into Valerie's bedroom. Steve performs at the After Dark's comedy showcase. He initially bombs, but quickly recovers. He confesses to Carly that he stole all of the well-received material from Richard Belzer, and shares his history of stupid behavior.
222	14	"Santa Knows"	Charles Correll	Laurie McCarthy	December 17, 1997	2197215	12.26
Kelly considers filing sexual harassment charges against Monahan, but does not want to interfere with a fundraiser for the clinic. Monahan makes a pass at her during the event; Kelly talks with a supervisor, who warns that reporting him could cause future employers to label her a troublemaker. Brandon goes to Emma's apartment to pick up a column, and has sex with her. Wracked with guilt, he goes overboard trying to prove himself to Kelly. After Ben's parents reject his Christmas peace offering, he tells David that he plans to move in with an aunt and uncle. David realizes that he is lying and returns to stop him from slashing his wrists. He takes Ben back to the Walsh house, where Valerie convinces him not to give up on life. Ben's parents ask him to come home, and his father vows to try his best to accept him. Val and David realize how much they mean to each other. Noah upsets Donna by pushing her away during the holidays. Steve and a Santa-suit clad Nat help restore Zach's Christmas spirit after a friend tells him that there is no Santa Claus.
223	15	"Ready or Not"	John McPherson	Story by : Michael Cassutt & Rich Cooper & Laurie McCarthy; Teleplay by : Michael Cassutt & Laurie McCarthy	January 7, 1998	2197216	11.69
Carly and Zack temporarily move in with Donna at the beach front apartment after they are evicted from their house for repairs where she gives Donna love life advice who's deciding whether or not to move onto the next stage with Noah. Meanwhile, Dr. Monahan angrily confronts Kelly about her sexual harassment charge against him and forces her out of the clinic. Emma suggests that she expose him, so Kelly turns on the intercom as Monahan makes another pass at her. Brandon barges in, and the foundation immediately fires Monahan, who will be replaced by Donna's father. David finally admits to Donna about his relationship with Valerie being a farce, but that soon changes when Valerie admits getting feelings for him again. After Emma quits her job at Brandon's newspaper agency, she puts pressure on him who is determined to hide their Christmas fling at any cost, while Brandon hires a new writer, named Janet Sosna, as Emma's replacement. Also, Valerie has a run-in with Duke, Brandon's former bookmaker, whom she tells to stay away from the Peach Pit After Dark, until he offers her a cut of his winnings. Elsewhere, Steve and Brandon rescue David from his car wash job by offering him another as a music critic for their paper, and little Zack accidentally draws on Donna's design sketches just before a meeting with a new potential employer. Lindsay Price first appears as Janet Sosna, she would later be made a series regular. John Prosky replaces Billy Vera in the role of bookie Duke Weatherill. Brian McKnight makes a special appearance.
224	16	"Illegal Tender"	Anson Williams	Ken Stringer	January 14, 1998	2197217	12.67
Brandon admits his affair to Steve. Steve suggests that they gauge Kelly's reaction by making her the advice columnist and having her respond to a letter about a similar situation. Steve intercepts a call from Emma; Kelly overhears and assumes that he is cheating on Carly. She lectures Steve and advises him to emulate Brandon. Kelly confronts Emma, who stuns her by playing the tape of Brandon's confession. A devastated Kelly breaks up with Brandon and orders him to leave her alone. A young singer accosts David for his scathing review, which resulted in her firing. David realizes that he misjudged her and helps her get a gig at the After Dark. Val buys David a new keyboard after he expresses a desire to return to music. Noah tries in vain to shut down Val's bookmaking operation. Duke sets her up with an undercover cop, and Valerie and Noah get arrested. Carly experiences a nightmarish day as she loses Zach at the mall. A kindly stranger drops off the boy at the security offices. This episode features a special appearance by Jamie Blake.
225	17	"The Elephant's Father"	Michael Ray Rhodes	Story by : Elle Triedman & John Whelpley; Teleplay by : Elle Triedman	January 21, 1998	2197218	12.61
Kelly moves in with Donna and Carly. Brandon expects Kelly to immediately take him back and will not give her any space. He gets plastered, staggers over to the apartment, and yells at Kelly. He refuses to leave until she threatens to call the police. Donna gets upset with Noah when he defends Brandon and claims that Kelly should "get over it." Brandon chases a minivan that cut him off and tries to attack the driver, a woman who has two children in the car. Noah realizes that Brandon has lost it, and apologizes to Donna. Valerie must perform community service at the clinic as punishment for her bookmaking arrest. Kelly smugly orders her around, so Val tries to get revenge by interfering with her relationship with Brandon. She tears up Brandon's messages and plays matchmaker for Kelly and an intern. Brandon shows up at the apartment late at night, but Kelly is not prepared to give him another chance. Carly's father suffers a heart attack and undergoes quadruple bypass surgery. She decides to move to Montana to assist with his recovery. In spite of Steve's pleas, she determines that she must relocate permanently in order to give Zach some stability. David works on a feature about an up and coming band, Jasper's Law. The group buys one of his compositions, a love song he had once written for Donna. Kelly encourages a domestic abuse victim to escape from her husband. This is the final appearance of Hilary Swank as Carly Reynolds. Three years later, she won an Academy Award for Best Actress.
226	18	"Rebound"	Charles Pratt, Jr.	Michael Cassutt	January 28, 1998	2197219	12.13
Valerie completes her community service, but not before arranging for Brandon to run into Kelly and Jeff during a date. A woman considers calling off her wedding to one of Steve's old frat brothers, and seeks refuge at the Walsh house. She bonds with Brandon over their fractured relationships, and decides to get married after all. Steve observes the couple's commitment to each other and realizes that he must get over Carly; he would have followed her to Montana if he had truly loved her. The keyboardist for Jasper's Law gets into a car accident while driving drunk. He claims that Noah is negligent for serving him too many drinks. David is aware that Mark had been smoking marijuana before the crash, but keeps quiet after Mark threatens to squash his songwriting deal. He finally shares the truth with the group leader, who fires Mark and replaces him with David. Donna loses her job when she stands up to a temperamental child model, but gets it back by dressing up like a clown. Brandon again shows up on Kelly's doorstep at night. He explains that he cheated on her because he was frightened by the prospect of commitment, and insists that she "owes" him another chance. She slams the door in his face.
227	19	"Crimes and Misdemeanors"	Charles Correll	Laurie McCarthy	February 4, 1998	2197220	12.44
David angers Valerie by moving out of her room and into Carly's old house. She apologizes for her behavior and arranges for a record company executive to watch Jasper's Law perform at the club. The group receives a new record deal, thanks in large part to David's song. Valerie believes that the song is about her, and is hurt to learn that David wrote it for Donna. Donna's grandmother must undergo surgery for an aneurysm. Donna introduces Noah to Mrs. Martin, but she still feels that David is Donna's soulmate. She requests a visit from David and asks him to look out for Donna. Mrs. Martin suffers heart problems after the surgery and soon dies. Val discourages David from attending the funeral, while Noah asks him to spend time with Donna because of their history. Donna and David share a kiss, but decide to remain friends. Kelly meets an ex-convict, who was sentenced to prison at age seventeen for murdering his mother's abusive boyfriend. She asks Brandon to write a story about the man to help him find employment. Steve believes that he has secured a double date for Brandon and him. He fails to realize that the women are a lesbian couple who believe the guys are also gay. Josie Davis later had a recurring role as Camille Desmond, and Leslie Ishii had a recurring role as Janet's mother, Michelle Sosna.
228	20	"Cupid's Arrow"	Kevin Inch	Melissa Gould	February 11, 1998	2197221	12.14
Valerie and Noah are not enthused when David's song receives radio airplay. They express their discontent at the amount of time David and Donna are spending together. David and Donna lie about their whereabouts before embarking on a shopping trip. They get into a car accident; Donna injures her back and begins popping painkillers. Val encourages Noah to reach out to his estranged half-brother, Josh. Valerie and Noah believe that their mates are cheating on them and become depressed. Noah gets very drunk, and Josh furtively slips something into Valerie's drink. After Josh is distracted by a phone call, Noah takes Valerie to the office and has sex with her. Val awakens in a daze and feels extremely ill, despite the fact that she had only one drink. David takes her to a doctor, where test results find Rohypnol (the date-rape drug) in her system. David and Valerie race over to the boat and accuse Noah of rape. Kelly spends a romantic Valentine's Day with Jeff. He expresses a willingness to pass up a job offer and stay in Los Angeles with her, but she dumps him and goes back to Brandon. Steve finds himself juggling three dates, thanks to his friends' insistence on fixing him up. He becomes captivated by a mysterious stranger, but loses track of her. He gets pulled over by the police the next day, and is shocked to find that the cop is his mystery woman.
229	21	"The Girl Who Cried Wolf"	Richard Denault	Ken Stringer	February 25, 1998	2197222	10.48
Valerie presses rape charges against Noah. Kelly and Steve, citing Val's fake pregnancy and abortion, assume that she is lying in an attempt to extort money from Noah. David fights with Steve over his constant sarcastic remarks, and decides to move Val to his house. Donna believes that Noah is innocent, but pushes him away after learning that he did sleep with Valerie. The district attorney declines to file charges due to insufficient evidence; Val files a $10 million civil suit in the hopes of vindication. Josh proposes a $200,000 settlement without consulting Noah, who angrily withdraws the offer. Donna has difficulty keeping up with her work assignments because of her back pain and the effects of the painkillers. Josh supplies her with amphetamines, and she later steals drugs from her father's clinic. Brandon and Steve go on a ride-along with Steve's friend Tammy and her partner. Brandon believes that Tammy's partner used excessive force on a suspect, but decides not to write about it after the man agrees to counseling. The record company threatens to drop David when he stays away from the studio to spend time with Valerie.
230	22	"Law and Disorder"	Kevin Inch	Doug Steinberg	March 4, 1998	2197223	12.10
Noah's civil trial begins. His attorney portrays Valerie as a golddigging tramp, and uses the gang's testimony to place Noah in a favorable light. Josh's testimony reflects very badly on Noah, and Val wins the case. Everyone apologizes to Valerie and turns against Noah. While rummaging through Josh's belongings in search of more pills, Donna discovers a prescription for Rohypnol. Josh admits that he drugged Valerie, and Noah offers to help Val build a case against him. David's record company experiences a shake-up. The new reprensentative forces Jasper out of the band and turns over all creative control to David. Jasper accuses David of treachery. Unable to meet her deadline, the disoriented Donna steals designs from a co-worker. Noah finds Donna passed out on her living room floor. Joe E. Tata does not appear in this episode.
231	23	"Making Amends"	Joel J. Feigenbaum	Elle Triedman	March 11, 1998	2197224	12.03
The paramedics revive Donna; she returns home from the hospital quickly, but suffers from withdrawal. Donna is fired after confessing that she plagiarized her co-worker's designs. Noah helps her battle her addiction, and she forgives him for sleeping with Valerie. A teenager (Jessica Alba) abandons her baby outside of the clinic. Kelly cares for the child and tries to convince his mother to take him back. When this fails, she turns the baby over to social services. Kelly decides to apply to become the boy's foster mother. Brandon discovers that the record company paid a radio station to put David's song into rotation. A girl is injured at a concert as fans rush the stage. David quits the band and backs out of his record contract. Josh is sentenced to a year in jail for illegal drug possession. Valerie struggles to overcome memories of the rape and move on with her life. She concludes that neither she nor Noah is to blame for the crime. Steve finds love letters that are intended for another man. He meets with the sender, but lies about his identity.
232	24	"The Nature of Nurture"	Michael Ray Rhodes	Michael Cassutt	March 18, 1998	2197225	11.42
Kelly is upset when a gay couple receives custody of the baby. The teenage mother decides that she wants her son back, but only because she does not want him raised by gay men. Kyle and Gene give the child up without a fight, as they feel this is in his best interests. Kelly comes to believe that they would make better parents than she or Leann, and lobbies the girl to relinquish custody. She eventually agrees after realizing that she cannot care for the child properly. With the newspaper struggling to stay afloat, Steve accepts advertising from a cigarette manufacturer. Brandon becomes indignant and threatens to quit; Steve changes his mind by pointing out all the people he has helped through his writing. After a few dates, Steve finally tells Jill that he is not Ted (the man to whom she had been writing). She refuses to continue seeing him, and he vows to make her happy by finding Ted. David rediscovers his love of music by jamming with his neighbor, a washed-up guitar player who once won a Grammy. Val's mom comes to visit and takes a liking to Bill Taylor, who has just been released from prison. The potential romance horrifies Kelly and Valerie. Noah helps Donna finance production of her designs, and bribes someone into purchasing the outfits.
233	25	"Aunt Bea's Pickles"	Christopher Hibler	Laurie McCarthy	March 25, 1998	2197226	11.43
During Valerie's surprise birthday party, Abby announces that she and Bill are engaged. Val and Kelly join forces in the hopes of getting their parents to call off the wedding. They eventually realize that Bill and Abby are happy and decide to support them. Bill disgusts Kelly by backing out of the wedding and leaving her to break the news to Abby. Valerie gives David further insight into her traumatic family history as she tells him that her father sexually abused her. Brandon receives a job offer from a major newspaper, but faces a dilemma when he learns that he is only being hired as a replacement for striking reporters. He returns to the Beat and suggests implementing a health plan for the overworked and underpaid Janet. Steve hesitates to introduce Jill to Ted; she decides that she really likes Steve and comes back to him. When Donna's dresses fail to sell, Noah tries to give her a confidence boost by buying the entire stock himself. She is angry when she uncovers the truth.
234	26	"All That Glitters"	Michael Lange	Tyler Bensinger	April 1, 1998	2197227	10.39
Brandon works on a story with a pompous Pulitzer-Prize-winning reporter. Kelly gets a developmentally disabled young man a position at the clinic, where he freaks out after making a minor mistake. Kelly convinces Brandon to let Chris join the reporter and him on the ice at a Los Angeles Kings practice, but Raitt leaves town to work on another story. Brandon helps Chris get a dream job at a friend's ice skating rink. In order to pay his taxes, David takes a job as a jingle writer. A ballad he had written for Valerie ends up in a deodorant commercial. Steve realizes that he and Jill have nothing in common. She dumps him before he has the chance to break things off. Janet has a crush on Steve, but he doesn't seem to get it. Donna discovers that the diamond jewelry that Noah gave her is fake. Joe E. Tata does not appear in this episode.
235	27	"Reunion"	Chip Chalmers	Doug Steinberg	April 15, 1998	2197228	10.66
The gang prepares for its five-year high school reunion. Andrea returns for the event; after initially pretending that her life is perfect, she reveals that she is divorcing Jesse. Brandon tries to convince her to work things out; but she has already tried every possible solution, even dropping out of medical school to spend more time with her family. Andrea does not want to speak at the reunion, so Brandon takes her place and delivers a speech with the theme "it's okay to be yourself." Kelly becomes disgusted when Ross Webber, the guy who humiliated her after she lost her virginity to him, tries to exchange pleasantries. Valerie gives Ross a dressing-down and helps Kelly eradicate some old graffiti about her. Steve is upset that his classmates expect him to bring a bimbo to the reunion. Janet volunteers to be his date to help him change his image. He completely ignores her to chase after a beautiful classmate. The woman is actually plotting revenge against Steve for mistreating her in school (when she was a geek); she arranges a prank in which he appears naked before the entire gathering. Steve shows up at Janet's house late at night to apologize, but she decides not to date him. Valerie attends the reunion with David and savors the chance to be anonymous. She claims that she works with the poor and that David is an international rock star. Donna becomes angry when a magazine names Noah one of L.A.'s most eligible bachelors. Gabrielle Carteris returns as Andrea Zuckerman. Spin Doctors make a special appearance.
236	28	"Skin Deep"	Kim Friedman	Elle Triedman	April 29, 1998	2197229	9.15
A "sex shop" opens in Beverly Hills. Brandon, Steve and David patronize the store, under the guise of covering the controversy for the newspaper. Brandon infuriates Kelly by defending the store and its clientele, and attending a wild bachelor party for Muntz. A misunderstanding causes David and Val to fear that they are having problems with their sex life. Steve decides that he is interested in Janet after she expresses her philosophy on free love. Donna discovers that her assistant, who has very low self-esteem, calms herself by cutting her arms with a razor. She tries to convince her to seek help. Donna asks women of normal measurements to appear in her catalog because she believes that using models would send the wrong message. Kelly is revolted when Jackie opts to get a face lift and Erin frets about calories. Joe E. Tata does not appear in this episode.
237	29	"Ricochet"	Anson Williams	Laurie McCarthy	May 6, 1998	2197230	9.96
Kelly finds it impossible to trust Brandon as he works late every night for several weeks. Brandon assures Kelly that he will never leave her and suddenly asks her to marry him. They experience doubts, but decide that they are ready for a lifetime commitment. Noah entertains Gwyneth, a longtime friend. She secretly has a crush on him, and kisses him on a ferris wheel. Noah insists that he is not interested in her. David becomes extremely jumpy after being robbed at an ATM. He gets drunk, steals a gun from the After Dark's cash register, and staggers into the alley behind the club. When Noah and Gwyneth try to stop him, he shoots at a dumpster; a bullet ricochets and hits Gwyneth in the arm. Donna asks Gwyneth to stay at her apartment because she doesn't trust her around Noah. Valerie learns that she is a match for a leukemia patient in need of a bone marrow transplant. The man's son urges her not to go through with the operation, as his father molested both of his daughters and may do the same to his grandchildren. Valerie refuses to donate the marrow, although another match is soon found. David lectures Val about her decision. Steve finds himself attracted to one of the applicants for the assistant position at the Beat.
238	30	"The Fundamental Things Apply"	Harvey Frost	Michael Cassutt & Melissa Gould	May 13, 1998	2197231	10.15
David dumps Valerie and tells her that the break-up is her fault. Gwyneth admits that she is in love with Noah and seeks Valerie's help to get him away from Donna. Val suggests that she sabotage Donna's fashion show, so Gwyneth spills wine on most of the dresses. Noah orders Gwyneth to leave, but Donna lashes out at him for not ending the friendship. Val has a one-night stand with the fashion show photographer. She soon discovers that he is an intravenous drug user. Brandon and Kelly become overwhelmed by wedding preparations. They try to reunite a refugee with his wife, whom he lost when he was flown from Sarajevo for medical treatment. Sarah tells Steve that she is married, but separated from her husband. She decides to seek marriage counseling while continuing to date Steve. David throws a fit when a clothing store fails to pay him for a jingle.
239	31	"The Wedding"	Harry Harris	John Eisendrath & Laurie McCarthy & Doug Steinberg & Elle Triedman	May 20, 1998	2197232A	13.77
240	32	"The Wedding"	Harry Harris	John Eisendrath & Laurie McCarthy & Doug Steinberg & Elle Triedman	May 20, 1998	2197232B	13.77
Valerie confronts Johnny, who insists that he does not share needles and is healthy. David pushes Valerie to get tested for HIV, but she is afraid to learn the truth. She spends all of her time partying because she does not want to confront reality. While Val is out at a club with Noah, they climb onto the roof; she risks her life by walking along a ledge. Noah helps her down when she slips, and she drives him away after discovering a bleeding cut. A strung-out Johnny visits Val at the club and reveals that he is HIV positive. Brandon and Kelly quarrel over wedding details. They cannot pick out a ring, relate a memorable story for David's wedding video, or agree on vows. They fear that their disagreements are more than just the result of nerves. Noah upsets Donna by expressing his lack of faith in the institution of marriage. The wedding caterer saves Donna's life by pushing her out of the path of a runaway pickup truck. Sarah breaks Steve's heart and goes back to her husband. As the wedding day arrives, Brandon and Kelly finally seem to have overcome their doubts. However, while preparing for the ceremony, Kelly confesses to her mother that she isn't sure if she wants to go through with the marriage. Brandon expresses similar sentiments to Steve, who believes that he merely has cold feet. Brandon and Kelly mutually agree to call off the ceremony. They announce their decision to the guests and invite everyone to the reception, as they insist that they are happy. Valerie submits to an HIV test and anxiously awaits the results. Before taking Valerie to the clinic, David feels that he has to remind her that they are not a couple. Valerie goes into the doctor's office to learn the outcome of her test. Donna accepts a date with Jacob to thank him for saving her life. Noting her uncertain future with Noah, he makes a play for her. She turns him down and decides she would rather stay with Noah. Steve tries to win Sarah back from her husband. She shows up at the reception and expresses her feelings, but Steve isn't sure that he should believe her. James Eckhouse and Carol Potter return as Jim and Cindy Walsh.
