= Beverly Hills, 90210 season 9 =

Beverly Hills, 90210
- Season 9
- DVD cover
- Starring: Jason Priestley Jennie Garth Ian Ziering Brian Austin Green Tori Spelling Tiffani-Amber Thiessen Vincent Young Lindsay Price Joe E. Tata Daniel Cosgrove Vanessa Marcil Special guest star: Luke Perry as Dylan
- No. of episodes: 26

Release
- Original network: Fox
- Original release: September 16, 1998 – May 19, 1999

Season chronology
- ← Previous; Season 8 Next → Season 10

The ninth season of Beverly Hills, 90210, is an American drama television series aired from September 16, 1998, on Fox and concluded on May 19, 1999, after 26 episodes.

The season aired Wednesday nights at 8/9c and was released on DVD in 2010.

== Synopsis ==
The West Beverly gang continues to navigate the challenges of adulthood during their second year in the real world, facing new experiences and gaining a deeper understanding of themselves. As their lives change, old friendships are tested and new relationships develop. Despite the challenges and complexities of their evolving circumstances, they continue to rely on their shared experiences and mutual support. The group also confronts various issues affecting their personal and professional lives, including dysfunctional families, alcohol abuse, infidelity, financial difficulties, statutory rape, gang violence, romantic relationships, crime, career challenges, drug abuse, bulimia, and rape.

== Cast ==
=== Starring ===
- Jason Priestley as Brandon Walsh (episodes 1–5)
- Jennie Garth as Kelly Taylor
- Ian Ziering as Steve Sanders
- Brian Austin Green as David Silver
- Tori Spelling as Donna Martin
- Tiffani-Amber Thiessen as Valerie Malone (episodes 1–7)
- Vincent Young as Noah Hunter
- Lindsay Price as Janet Sosna
- Joe E. Tata as Nat Bussichio
- Daniel Cosgrove as Matt Durning (episodes 4–26)
- Vanessa Marcil as Gina Kincaid (episodes 7–26)

=== Special guest star ===
- Luke Perry as Dylan McKay (episodes 7–26)

=== Recurring ===
- Denise Dowse as Vice Principal Yvonne Teasley
- Laura Leighton as Sophie Burns
- Michelle Phillips as Abby Malone
- Leigh Taylor-Young as Blythe Hunter
- Ray Wise as Daniel Hunter
- Cari Shayne as Lauren Durning
- Shawn Christian as Wayne Moses
- Bruce Thomas as Carl Schmidt
- Cliff Dorfman as Joe Patch
- Karen Austin as Bobbi Kincaid
- Christopher Daniel Barnes as Lenny

== Episodes ==
- Jason Priestley's and Tiffani Amber Thiessen's last season
- Luke Perry returns as a recurring character before returning as a main member
- This season marks the first season having a low episode count as seasons previous had episodes over 30.

No. overall	No. in season	Title	Directed by	Written by	Original release date	Prod. code	U.S. viewers (millions)
241	1	"The Morning After"	Anson Williams	John Eisendrath	September 16, 1998	2198233	11.87
Brandon and Kelly sleep together the night of the aborted wedding. Brandon considers their night together a mistake, while Kelly realizes that she wishes they had married after all. A lonely Brandon goes to Kelly's apartment in search of comfort and ends up staying the night. He then rejects Kelly's suggestion that they go on their honeymoon, and declares that he wants to move on. After her HIV test comes back negative, Valerie annoys everyone with her new policy of brutal honesty. David takes her cue and issues an ultimatum to his boss, who cuts him loose. David suspects that Val is pushing everyone away to punish herself for some reason. Valerie makes a stunning confession about her father's death. He did not commit suicide; she murdered him. Donna goes against Noah's wishes by accepting an invitation to have dinner with his parents on Mr. Hunter's birthday. The evening proves to be a disaster, just as Noah had predicted. His father later visits the club and reveals that his company has gone bankrupt and the entire family is broke. A con artist named Sophie Burns befriends Steve, who gives her his room. She claims to be a graduate student at C.U., but actually has show biz aspirations. In spite of Steve's generosity, she decides to make a move on David. Lindsay Price is added to the opening credits.
242	2	"Budget Cuts"	Chip Chalmers	Laurie McCarthy	September 23, 1998	2198234	10.09
After learning that the clinic may lose funding, Kelly asks Brandon to write a story to generate publicity. They try to collaborate on the article, but find that working together is too painful. Kelly organizes an auction to raise money for the clinic. She models her wedding gown in the fashion show portion of the event, and Brandon outbids everyone for a date with her. Brandon and Kelly take a walk on the beach and decide that they are through. The clinic must still cut back its staff (even after the fundraiser), so Kelly resigns. Although David believes that Valerie killed her father in self-defense and should move on, she insists on bringing her mother to town to discuss the situation. When Val tries to confess, she learns that Abby knew of the abuse prior to her husband's death. She did not take any action because she believed that Victor would seek help. Valerie finds a connection with Abby's fiancé, an ex-policeman. He killed an acquaintance in the line of duty, but has come to realize that he was not to blame. Noah offers his support to his father and enjoys an afternoon with him. When Mr. Hunter rejects his assistance, Noah snaps that his father has no one but himself to blame for his problems. Mr. Hunter commits suicide moments after the argument. Sophie cashes in her student loan and sneaks around with David. David's work as emcee at the auction gets him a try-out with a local radio station. Joe E. Tata does not appear in this episode.
243	3	"Dealer's Choice"	Jeff Melman	Douglas Steinberg	September 30, 1998	2198235	10.70
Abby announces that she and Carl are planning to elope in Las Vegas, and asks Val to be her maid of honor. Valerie bonds with Carl during an evening at the casino, and sleeps with him the night before the wedding. A depressed Kelly begs Val to let her tag along on the trip because she believes that Brandon is seeing someone else. She has a good time gambling and hanging out with a stranger, until the sight of a woman in a wedding dress brings her back to reality. Noah develops an obsession with his father's gun after the police return it to him. He drinks heavily and causes an embarrassing scene at the Martins' 25th wedding anniversary party. While working on Mr. Hunter's obituary, Brandon begins to fear that he will never have any meaningful accomplishments. He meets with a reporter from a New York paper, who sets up a job interview. A woman helping Donna pursue an account poses as her business partner, then steals her designs to get an in-house position with the client. Steve catches Sophie and David at a coffeehouse, but she lies her way out of the situation. David has a successful audition and receives a full-time job as a disc jockey. Joe E. Tata does not appear in this episode.
244	4	"Don't Ask, Don't Tell"	Richard Denault	Ken Stringer	October 28, 1998	2198236	10.74
Carl decides to annul his marriage to Abby because he believes that he has a future with Valerie. Valerie comes clean with her mother about her night with Carl, and confesses to killing her father. Despite Val's claims of self-defense, Abby plans to turn her in. Kelly stops at a newsstand to ogle a handsome man at a nearby table. Kelly notices that a store is for lease and decides that she and Donna should open a boutique. While looking over the space, she meets attorney Matt Durning (the guy she was checking out). Noah cannot bring himself to deliver his father's eulogy. He is arrested for drunk driving that night, and Kelly suggests that Matt represent him. Noah receives a fine and probation and is ordered to attend alcohol counseling. Kelly learns that Matt is building a child custody case for a wife beater whose spouse she once helped at the clinic. Matt insists that everyone has the right to representation, but Kelly blows him off. Steve gives Sophie a column for the Beat. The paper starts a web site, complete with a digital camera that records everyone's actions. David and Sophie have sex in the office, unaware that they are being transmitted onto the Internet. Steve blows up at David and throws Sophie out of his house. David blames Sophie for everything because he had warned her not to hurt Steve. Daniel Cosgrove joins the cast as Matt Durning. Jason Priestley and Joe E. Tata do not appear in this episode.
245	5	"Brandon Leaves"	Christopher Hibler	John Eisendrath	November 4, 1998	2198237	11.75
Brandon announces that he has accepted a job with the Washington bureau of the New York Chronicle. Kelly and Donna prepare to open their store, Now Wear This. Brandon becomes unnerved by the realization that Kelly is getting on with her life, and feels threatened by Matt's presence. Kelly meets with Leah, who explains that she returned to Lenny after learning that she was pregnant, but left again when he threatened her life. Although Kelly insists that she doesn't need his help, Brandon writes a story about the custody case. Brandon decides that he wants to stay in Los Angeles, but Kelly urges him to take the job and pursue his dreams. The gang throws a surprise going-away party for Brandon. Before departing, he convinces his parents to let Steve, Val and Noah stay in the house. Donna turns to Matt for comfort as she and Noah drift further apart. Valerie seeks legal advice from Matt. She explains that the killing was an accident, but Matt warns that a jury may not agree. Abby tells Val that she will not turn her in—not because she forgives her, but because she cannot deal with the shame of having everyone know her family's horrible secrets. Sophie finds it difficult to break into show business. She attracts attention to herself by renting a billboard with her picture, phone number and the message "Where's Sophie?" This is the final appearance of Jason Priestley as Brandon Walsh until season 10, Episode 293.
246	6	"Confession"	Kevin Inch	Tyler Bensinger	November 11, 1998	2198238	10.18
Lenny receives joint custody of his daughter. After he explodes in a rage during his first visit, Kelly decides to help Leah and her daughter skip town and assume a new identity. Lenny follows them, realizes what they are planning, and attacks Leah. Matt, bothered by a guilty conscience, helps Leah obtain the necessary identification to start her new life. Valerie elects to throw a massive rave as a farewell party before turning herself in to the police. David calls Abby to inform her of Val's plans, and she intercepts her daughter at the police station. She pleads with Val not to confess and offers forgiveness, insisting that she is to blame for not intervening on Valerie's behalf. Unable to communicate with Noah, Donna begins dating Matt. She hurts Matt's feelings by ignoring him during Val's party to tend to the inebriated Noah. Noah breaks a promise to Donna by skipping a court-mandated AA meeting and continuing to drink. Sophie tries her hand at waitressing after a disastrous photo shoot. A rich, handsome stranger recognizes her from the billboard and asks her to join him in Paris. She tells David that she has won a movie role, but he later discovers the truth. Steve and Janet struggle to keep the paper going in the aftermath of Brandon's departure. Steve decides to turn the Beat into a tabloid. While investigating a "haunted house," Steve and Janet get locked inside a refrigerator and have sex. They deny that the encounter was meaningful.
247	7	"You Say Goodbye, I Say Hello"	Michael Lange	Gretchen J. Berg & Aaron Harberts	November 18, 1998	2198239	12.30
As Kelly and Valerie pack Brandon's belongings for shipment, Kelly discovers a letter in which Val advised Brandon not to marry her. She turns everyone against Val and gets them to boycott her Thanksgiving gathering. Hoping to help Kelly understand Valerie's behavior, David details her troubled childhood. Although Val is not interested in her pity, Kelly insists on helping with Thanksgiving dinner. Kelly and Valerie establish another truce, but Valerie suddenly announces that she is moving back to Buffalo. She apologizes for all the trouble she caused, and thanks everyone for their friendship before leaving. David has a one-night stand with an apparent groupie, unaware that she is 17 years old. He faces statutory rape charges after the girl confesses to her parents. Noah blacks out while driving drunk and crashes his car. He fears that he may have been involved with a hit-and-run, and turns himself in. Donna's cousin Gina comes to town with an ice show. She loses her job and agent, but tries to hide the truth from Donna, who has always had a more privileged lifestyle than Gina. Noah goes on a bender following the death of the hit-and-run victim; Gina offers to watch over him. She kisses him in a photography booth at the amusement park. Noah is relieved to learn that he did not hit anyone with his car, and vows to stop drinking. Donna asks Gina to move into the beach apartment. Janet agrees to continue sleeping with Steve, but wants to see other people. She later admits that she isn't seeing anyone; she fears that Steve would hurt her if they dated. Matt and Kelly grow closer and share a kiss. Dylan surprises everyone by showing up at the house on Thanksgiving night. This is the final episode for Tiffani-Amber Thiessen as a series regular. Vanessa Marcil joins the cast as Gina Kincaid, and Luke Perry returns, credited in the opening credits as "special guest star". Joe E. Tata does not appear in this episode.
248	8	"I'm Back Because"	Artie Mandelberg	John Eisendrath	December 2, 1998	2198240	10.77
David is arrested for statutory rape and gets suspended from his radio show. Dylan bails him out of jail, then learns from Mrs. Teasley that Denise is a troubled girl who receives little attention from her parents. Dylan confronts Denise's parents and—speaking from his own experience as a neglected teen—explains that their daughter's actions are a cry for help. Denise drops the charges. David thanks Dylan by offering him a place to stay with him, as Dylan recently sold his house. Steve bristles at the news that his mother is dating her much younger co-star. Steve sees the man kissing another woman at the After Dark and starts a fight. Samantha reveals that she is not seeing the man; she is actually gay. Matt experiences a lull in his business and cannot pay his rent. Steve offers to let him move into the house in exchange for legal services for the Beat. Kelly's grandfather, who has emphysema, refuses to undergo an operation that could prolong his life. After Kelly tells him that Jackie will not abide by the terms of his living will (by removing him from life support), he gives Kelly power of attorney. Kelly's reaction to Dylan's return worries Matt. Dylan behaves mysteriously, but finally explains the reasons for his reappearance. He tells Kelly that he simply missed his hometown and wanted to come back to his friends, especially her. Gina tries to interfere in Donna's relationship with Noah. Ann Gillespie and Denise Dowse return as Jackie Taylor and Yvonne Teasley respectively. Joe E. Tata does not appear in this episode.
249	9	"The Following Options"	Gabrielle Beaumont	Laurie McCarthy	December 9, 1998	2198241	9.98
After Kelly's grandfather nearly dies of pneumonia, she reluctantly gives the doctors permission to hook him up to a ventilator. Jackie and Kelly realize that the machines are taking away Ed's dignity without improving his condition. They decide to bring him home to spend his remaining time with his family. Kelly grows angry with Matt when he takes a case defending a tobacco company. He drops the case and quits smoking to impress Kelly, but she kisses Dylan. Donna agrees to let a troubled fifteen-year-old girl buy a dress on layaway. The girl's fellow gang members convince her to slice up the dress and return it as damaged goods. Sonia later apologizes and offers to work off her debt at the store. Dylan takes his bullet-riddled Porsche out of storage. He impresses Gina by coming to her defense when a drunk harasses her at the club. Dylan catches the guy and his friends vandalizing the Porsche; he gets a knife away from one of them and threatens to kill him. Dylan has nightmares about Toni and decides to sell the car. He burns the money he receives from the sale, then buys heroin in an alley. The network fires Samantha from her new show after she admits that she is gay. Samantha fears that Steve is ashamed of her. Joe E. Tata does not appear in this episode.
250	10	"Marathon Man"	Joel J. Feigenbaum	Douglas Steinberg	December 16, 1998	2198242	10.00
Dylan whisks Kelly away to Cabo San Lucas, Mexico for the day. He buys her a hollow statue so that he can smuggle drugs back into the U.S. Kelly rejects Dylan and decides to focus on her relationship with Matt. Dylan promptly takes Gina to Mexico, and again smuggles heroin in a statue. When the statue ends up locked inside the boutique after hours, Dylan seduces Gina to get it back. Sonia and her boyfriend spend the night at Donna's store. One of Sonia's friends pulls a knife on her and warns her to stay away from her man. The store is robbed, and everyone believes that Sonia committed the crime to acquire enough money to escape the gang. She later reveals that she endured a beating to keep her friends from robbing the store, and a security guard actually committed the crime. Sonia thanks Donna for helping her get out of the gang. Steve mistakenly pledges $1,000 per hour for an AIDS dance-a-thon at the club; he wanted to donate a total of one thousand dollars. He tries to keep his costs down by sponsoring Muntz and his wife, only to find that they have been working with a personal trainer. The couple wins the contest, but The Beat ends up making money when Steve's generosity attracts new advertisers. Noah accosts Gina for getting Donna the wrong birthday cake. Gina explodes in anger and reveals her bitterness about living in Donna's shadow. This episode features a special appearance by The Brian Setzer Orchestra.
251	11	"How to Be the Jerk Women Love"	Harvey Frost	John Eisendrath	January 13, 1999	2198243	10.51
Gina finds heroin in Dylan's jacket. He throws out his stash to prove himself, but continues to get high. Dylan tries to visit Toni's grave, only to find that it has been moved. He buys a gun and heads for Marchette's house in the hopes of learning the new location. Dylan flees empty-handed from the house, but ends up getting arrested after the couple calls the police. Meanwhile, Kelly balks at sleeping with Matt. She helps out with David's radio show and advises listeners to take relationships slowly. She promptly spends the night with Matt. Steve puts on a seminar offering techniques on how to pick up women. His students express dissatisfaction at their results, but David scores with a line about a dead grandmother. Gina stirs up trouble between Donna and her mother. Joe E. Tata does not appear in this episode.
252	12	"Trials and Tribulations"	Roy Campanella II	Story by : Gretchen J. Berg & Aaron Harberts; Teleplay by : Ken Stringer	January 20, 1999	2198244	10.37
Dylan storms into the Marchette mansion and holds an elderly couple at gunpoint. They tell him that they purchased the house from Anthony Marchette's estate; he committed suicide a few weeks after Toni's death. Gina pushes Dylan away when he continues to use heroin. The cops pull him over on suspicion of breaking and entering, and find drugs and a gun on his bike. Suffering withdrawal symptoms, Dylan begs Gina to smuggle heroin into jail, but she declines. Steve's students demand a refund and take him to small-claims court. The case is heard on the television show Judge Mary. Although Steve loses, he believes that the publicity will help his business. David's new girlfriend dumps him after hearing him testify about using a pick-up line to seduce her. Donna and Noah house-sit for the Martins in order to gain some privacy. They invite their friends over for a barbecue. Matt brings Dylan to the party and suggests that he admit his drug problem to everyone. Gina reluctantly gives Dylan heroin, then stalks off when he ignores her. Dylan accidentally collides with Donna, who hits her head and tumbles into the pool. Joe E. Tata does not appear in this episode.
253	13	"Withdrawal"	Kevin Inch	Tyler Bensinger & John Eisendrath	January 27, 1999	2198245	10.35
Donna is not seriously injured, and forgives Dylan for the accident. Dylan's friends encourage him to check into rehab. Kelly acts very pushy and suggests that Gina and Matt are responsible for Dylan's problems. Dylan sneaks out the bathroom window and attempts to go through withdrawal on his own. Kelly finds him lying on her doorstep and takes him to the hospital. Matt cuts a deal with the district attorney to keep Dylan out of jail, but isn't sure that he deserves another chance. Dylan goes into cardiac arrest and has to be revived through a defibrillator. Kelly realizes that she must back off and learn to respect Gina's relationship with Dylan. Matt receives a surprising call from a woman in New York. Donna designs a gown for a famous singer to wear to a nationally televised awards show. She fears that she is ruined when the woman looks like a wreck (with uncombed hair and garish accessories). However, the teenagers who emulate the singer soon flock to Donna's store. Steve gets into hot water with Janet after he accidentally lets her purebred dog mate with a mutt.
254	14	"I'm Married"	Anson Williams	John Eisendrath	February 3, 1999	2198246	9.71
Matt flies to New York to visit Lauren, who has spent the past three years in a mental institution. She returns to Los Angeles with Matt, but he is reluctant to introduce her to Kelly. David and Gina see the couple kissing on the street. Kelly angrily breaks up with Matt, then decides that she will fight for him. Matt informs Kelly that Lauren is his wife. Dylan performs community service on a road crew. He objects to the tyrannical foreman's treatment of one of the other workers, an upstanding family man. Dylan gets into a fight with the foreman; he must smooth things over to spare his friend from an unfair punishment. Dylan angers Gina by confiding in his sponsor while shutting Gina out. David meets a woman who may be his perfect match, but she seems to have stood him up. Steve and Donna engage in a war of practical jokes with Noah after they catch him cheating at strip poker.
255	15	"Beheading St. Valentine"	Frank Thackery	Laurie McCarthy	February 10, 1999	2198247	9.52
Although he loves Lauren and feels obligated to help her readjust to society, Matt expresses a desire to stay with Kelly. Kelly tries to maintain her relationship with Matt, but realizes she must bow out following a plea from Lauren. Donna becomes furious upon discovering old photos of Gina kissing Noah at the amusement park. She agrees to pose as David's girlfriend at a business function, where they keep up appearances by kissing for a photograph. They later kiss in David's truck. Donna feels guilty and forgives Noah; Gina drops hints suggesting that she slept with him. Steve discovers an irregular mole and fears that he may have skin cancer. He vows to turn his life around and apologizes for taking Janet for granted. She sleeps with him, but he returns to his old ways after tests come back negative. Dylan tries to keep his mind off drugs by having sex with Gina in public places. Gina lashes out at Dylan, as she feels that he is using her. This episode features a special appearance by Wild Orchid.
256	16	"Survival Skills"	Charlie Correll	Story by : Gretchen J. Berg & Aaron Harberts; Teleplay by : Doug Steinberg	February 17, 1999	2198248	9.26
Lauren has a reaction to her medication. She learns that she will die if she continues to take her medication; without the pills, her schizophrenia will resurface. Lauren prepares to return to the institution, but Matt proposes that they illegally obtain more pills and spend their remaining weeks together on a second honeymoon. Kelly stops sulking about Matt long enough to buy Dylan a classic car to lift his spirits. Gina becomes extremely jealous. Donna breaks up with Noah after he confesses to sleeping with Gina. Gina later reveals that they did not have sex. Donna insults her and refuses to forgive Noah. She co-hosts David's radio show for a night and reminisces about the good times. David shows up on Donna's doorstep, and they share a passionate kiss. Steve and Janet take a pair of troubled teens on a camping trip. While trying to counsel the bickering kids, Steve and Janet end up seeking romantic advice. Janet accidentally lets her feelings for Steve slip out. They spend the night together in the jeep and finally decide to pursue a relationship. Joe E. Tata does not appear in this episode.
257	17	"Slipping Away"	Roy Campanella II	John Eisendrath	March 3, 1999	2198249	9.23
Kelly and Dylan agree to go to Mexico and obtain medication for Lauren. Kelly has second thoughts about their mission. She sleeps with Dylan, then decides that she doesn't want to buy the drugs. Dylan confuses Kelly when he starts babbling about their relationship to the customs official. Dylan explains that he got the medicine, and needed to distract the customs official to keep him from searching the car. Lauren elects not to take the pills, as she would rather return to the institution and hope for a cure. She asks Kelly to watch over Matt and help him get on with his life. Donna agrees to a date with the persistent David. She rejects Noah's pleas for a reconciliation and asks for time to make a decision. Gina discovers that her mother spent most of the money she earned skating as a minor. Donna encourages her to sue the trustee who failed to protect her interests, and is stunned to find that it is Felice. Janet hides her relationship with Steve from her father, who only wants her to date Japanese men. After Steve professes his love, Janet tells her father the truth and gets thrown out of the house.
258	18	"Bobbi Dearest"	Christian I. Nyby II	Laurie McCarthy & Tyler Bensinger	March 10, 1999	2198250	9.31
Gina decides to sue Felice for $1.1 million for the money her mother misspent and "pain and suffering." Donna, torn apart by her family's bickering, runs crying to Noah. She doesn't believe that David has a right to be angry, but later apologizes and claims that he is just lonely. He follows her advice and uses his radio show to field offers from potential girlfriends. He loses track of the woman who most interests him, and eventually discovers that she works for a cleaning service that cleans the club. Donna convinces her mother to repay Gina the $60,000 she lost. It turns out at the end that both Gina and Bobbi had actually orchestrated a scam to rip off Felice; they celebrate their success. Meanwhile, Matt learns that Lauren has filed for divorce. Kelly wants to take things slowly, but cannot stay away from Matt. Dylan nearly dies in a Jet Ski accident. He tries to track down the guy who revived him. He learns that the man, devastated by the death of his little brother, had planned to commit suicide. Dylan funds a new children's playground at the hospital, and encourages Tim to help with the construction as a tribute to his brother. Steve purchases a madam's black book and considers publishing information about the woman's famous clients. Matt uses the book to blackmail a district attorney into freeing his client, an innocent teenager accused of drug dealing because of her race.
259	19	"The Leprechaun"	Kevin Inch	John Eisendrath	March 17, 1999	2198251	9.28
Noah faces foreclosure after failing to make his mortgage payments on the Peach Pit/After Dark building. He accepts an offer from a restaurant owner willing to pay much higher rent, and decides to terminate Nat's lease. Noah ignores a warning from Dylan, who buys the building so that Nat can stay. Claudia reveals that her visa will soon expire; David vows to help her stay in the country. When a job offer falls through, David agrees to marry Claudia. As a promotion, Steve has a man dress up as a leprechaun and promises a "pot of gold" to the person who catches him. A butcher takes the offer seriously and demands a reward, then pulls out a knife when Steve is unable to pay. The man breaks down in tears and explains that his son needs heart surgery. The paper helps finance the operation, thanks to donations sent in by readers touched by the man's plight. Kelly and Donna clash when Kelly hires a public relations guru to attract more attention to the store. Kelly fears that Matt's experience with Lauren will cause him to play it safe in all future relationships.
260	20	"Fortune Cookie"	Luke Perry	Douglas Steinberg & Ken Stringer	April 7, 1999	2198252	8.56
David and Claudia proceed with plans for their wedding, and attempt to document their relationship to avoid suspicion. Claudia realizes that David is having doubts; she elects to return to Venezuela and apply for another visa. Dylan rigs a raffle so that Kelly can have the opportunity to meet her favorite singer. Gina goes to the man's hotel room, claiming to be Kelly. She spends the night at the hotel to make Dylan jealous, although she later insists that nothing happened. Kelly helps Matt film a television commercial to solicit new clients. Matt fears that Kelly does not like him for himself, and suspects that she is hung up on Dylan. Donna designs costumes for a production at West Beverly, where an acquaintance accuses the drama teacher of molesting her during her teen years. Donna does not believe her claims, until the woman explains that she drove Donna away from the drama class to protect her. Donna and Ashley take action after discovering that the teacher made inappropriate advances toward a current student. A psychic, bitter over her firing by The Beat, makes a prediction that causes Steve to develop performance anxiety. Joe E. Tata does not appear in this episode.
261	21	"I Wanna Reach Out and Grab Ya"	Jennie Garth	Gretchen J. Berg & Aaron Harberts	April 14, 1999	2198253	8.86
Donna is stunned to learn that her parents have separated and initially thinks Felice's cold, difficult personality is the reason, but Noah finds out that Dr. Martin is having a mid-life crisis and still loves his wife, eventually convincing Donna's dad to return to his wife. Gina gets hit from all sides when a lucrative house-sitting job for Oksana Baiul ends with her painful firing, Kelly says she loves Dylan while being hypnotized, and she's nearly raped only to have everyone think she's lying about it. Gina and Dylan ultimately reconcile but Kelly and Dylan remain in each other's thoughts. Elsewhere, David finds out the DJ he worshipped has become a shunned dinosaur and contrives to get his hero a second chance, and Steve and Janet do a story on a child prodigy that brings up out some regrets for Janet over her past. Joe E. Tata does not appear in this episode.
262	22	"Local Hero"	Joel J. Feigenbaum	Matt Dearborn	April 21, 1999	2198254	8.39
Kelly and Dylan run into each other at the market and share a cup of coffee. They subdue a man who tries to attack a pregnant woman and her child, and help the woman get to the hospital to have her baby. When the press approaches Kelly, she identifies Steve as the hero because she and Dylan don't want to admit that they were together. Steve initially relishes the attention, but soon suffers from a guilty conscience. He confronts Kelly and Dylan and states that everyone can tell that they want each other. Kelly plans to tell Matt the truth, while Dylan considers breaking up with Gina. Gina receives an offer to become a skating commentator, but loses the job (partially because of Matt's hardball negotiating technique). Matt apologizes and offers Gina work as his assistant. Dylan cannot bring himself to break up with Gina while she is in this vulnerable state. Kelly tells Matt that Dylan was the hero, but stops short of disclosing the fact that she slept with Dylan in Mexico. Noah reveals that he has a half-sister, who is working at a nearby diner. Donna learns that the woman is moving away and manages to arrange a meeting with Noah. Steve visits a group for sex addicts in the hopes of uncovering celebrity dirt. David makes a date with Katie, the group leader.
263	23	"The End of the World as We Know It"	Michael Ray Rhodes	Story by : Gretchen J. Berg & Aaron Harberts; Teleplay by : Tyler Bensinger	April 28, 1999	2198255	8.31
Kelly and Matt babysit Erin, and have sex in the living room after she goes to sleep. They do not realize that Mel and Jackie have set up a video camera to observe prospective nannies with Erin. Erin switches the tape with a copy of "There's Something About Mary," and the illicit video ends up in Dylan and Gina's hands. Dylan becomes furious, prompting Gina to suspect that he still has feelings for Kelly. She believes that Dylan is trying to overcompensate by arranging a private concert by Monica, and tricks him into admitting that he slept with Kelly in Mexico. Matt breaks up with Kelly, who reminds him that he was married at the time. He forgives her after she insists that she never revealed the truth because she did not want to add to his woes. Donna asks Wayne, a good-looking pro beach volleyball player, to model her new line of men's wear. Matt files a lawsuit on behalf of cancer victims against a number of companies that polluted the environment—including Hunter Oil. Noah refuses to cooperate, and suggests that he and Donna live together so that he can move away from Matt. Donna hesitates because of her attraction to Wayne, whom she kisses in a restaurant. Steve panics about the possibility of massive computer failure on New Year's 2000, and becomes obsessed with stockpiling supplies. Janet believes that he is just trying to avoid the romantic vacation they had planned for New Year's. Steve explains that he is gun-shy about relationships because Celeste, Carly and Clare all dumped him; Janet promises not to leave. Katie sleeps with David, then has difficulty dealing with it and says she must abstain for at least a year. David admits that he cannot handle this, and breaks up with her. This episode features a special appearance by Monica.
264	24	"Dog's Best Friend"	Christopher Hibler	Story by : John Eisendrath; Teleplay by : Laurie McCarthy	May 5, 1999	2198256	8.06
David comforts a drunken and depressed Gina outside the After Dark, and she responds with a kiss. David and Dylan spend the weekend in Las Vegas, where Dylan has a one-night stand, but lets the woman believe that he wants to see her again. David, disgusted by Dylan's behavior, gives the woman their address when she inquires about a visit. She shows up just as Dylan and Gina are on the verge of getting back together. Dylan believes that David is in love with Gina and shouts that he can have her, unaware that she is standing outside. Dylan apologizes and tells Gina that she should find a man who is capable of a relationship. Kelly arranges some dental work for Gina; Mel notices decay that indicates that she is bulimic, but Gina denies her problem. Matt shows Noah a report that proves that Mr. Hunter was aware that a new partnership would harm the environment. A devastated Noah decides to help Matt prepare the case. They discover a memo that exonerates Noah's father, as he demanded that the project be shelved. Mr. Hunter's associates had hidden this information so that they could pin the blame on him. Donna decides not to move in with Noah. She sneaks around with Wayne, justifying her behavior by claiming that she will still end up with Noah if they are meant to be together. Steve and Janet try a computer matchmaking service. Dylan calls Kelly from a coffee shop and asks to see her, as he is considering getting high. While walking from her car, she is brutally attacked by a man with a knife, who shoves her into an alley and rapes her. Joe E. Tata does not appear in this episode.
265	25	"Agony"	Anson Williams	Douglas Steinberg	May 12, 1999	2198257	8.21
Kelly receives medical treatment and files a police report. She tells Dylan what has happened, and stays over at his house for several nights. She also confides in Donna, but cannot bring herself to tell Matt. He notices her odd behavior and suspects that she is seeing Dylan. Kelly receives counseling from a rape crisis center, but still feels extremely vulnerable. Dylan gets her a gun. Matt helps a thief gain his release through a technicality. His client is the same man who raped Kelly, and they nearly run into each other. Although Dylan warns that she is still fragile, David asks Gina on a date. He supports her as she tries out for a spot in an ice show. Gina does not emerge for her audition; she has passed out in the bathroom after purging. Wayne asks Donna to accompany him to Acapulco for a volleyball tournament. She turns him down because she does not want to shake up her life. After one of his photographs receives acclaim, Steve tries to impress Janet by becoming a professional photographer.
266	26	"That's the Guy"	Michael Lange	John Eisendrath	May 19, 1999	2198258	8.46
Kelly tells Matt about the rape. Dylan puts up a $100,000 reward for information leading to the capture of the rapist. Some men try to ambush him and take the money, but Matt helps chase them away. Joe asks Matt to help him file a lawsuit charging police brutality. He goes to Now Wear This and finds Kelly working alone. When she recognizes him, he locks the door and brandishes a knife. She pulls her gun out of her purse and fires off a round of shots. Noah breaks up with Donna because he does not trust her. Believing that Donna's behavior stemmed from concern for Kelly, he comes over to apologize. He finds that she has slept with Wayne, and refuses to give her another chance. Wayne leaves for the summer to play in a series of tournaments. However, he then takes a job in Los Angeles and tells Donna that he wants to be with her. Gina confides in David about her bulimia and seeks refuge at his house. David erupts after finding Gina in bed with Dylan. Steve and Janet throw a party to celebrate the fact that The Beat is finally showing a profit. Janet still feels uneasy about the paper's sleazy material. Steve expresses remorse about their objectionable treatment of women; he allows a support group for victims of sexual abuse to meet in the offices. This episode features a special appearance by Collective Soul. Joe E. Tata does not appear in this episode.
