= Beverly Hills, 90210 season 2 =

Beverly Hills, 90210
- Season 2
- DVD cover
- Starring: Jason Priestley Shannen Doherty Jennie Garth Ian Ziering Gabrielle Carteris Luke Perry Brian Austin Green Tori Spelling Carol Potter James Eckhouse
- No. of episodes: 28

Release
- Original network: Fox
- Original release: July 11, 1991 – May 7, 1992

Season chronology
- ← Previous; Season 1 Next → Season 3

The second season of Beverly Hills, 90210, an American teen drama television series aired from July 11, 1991, on Fox and concluded on May 7, 1992, after 28 episodes.

== Overview ==
The Walshes' first summer in the area is marked by heartbreak, fraud, lies, and betrayal, as new relationships develop while others come to an end. The Walshes and their friends return to West Bev for their junior year, approaching the school year with greater confidence and experience. As they continue their education, they encounter personal challenges, changing relationships, and increasing responsibilities as they move closer to adulthood.

== Cast ==
=== Starring ===
- Jason Priestley as Brandon Walsh
- Shannen Doherty as Brenda Walsh
- Jennie Garth as Kelly Taylor
- Ian Ziering as Steve Sanders
- Gabrielle Carteris as Andrea Zuckerman
- Luke Perry as Dylan McKay
- Brian Austin Green as David Silver
- Tori Spelling as Donna Martin
- Carol Potter as Cindy Walsh
- James Eckhouse as Jim Walsh

=== Recurring ===
- Joe E. Tata as Nat Bussichio
- Douglas Emerson as Scott Scanlon
- Christine Elise as Emily Valentine
- Denise Dowse as Vice Principal Yvonne Teasley
- David Lascher as Kyle Conners

== Episodes ==
No. overall	No. in season	Title	Directed by	Written by	Original release date	Prod. code	U.S. viewers (millions)
23	1	"Beach Blanket Brandon"	Charles Braverman	Darren Star	July 11, 1991	2191022	19.1
With their Sophomore year over, Brenda has a life changing development. Meanwhile, Brandon wants to earn enough money to buy a new car and has to make a difficult decision with his job at the Peach.
24	2	"The Party Fish"	Daniel Attias	Charles Rosin	July 18, 1991	2191023	16.0
Working at the Beach Club, Brandon meets Jerry Ratinger who hires him as a driver for his wife, but learns some shocking information on the job. Meanwhile, Brenda decides to attend summer school with Donna and Andrea in order to get her mind off Dylan.
25	3	"Summer Storm"	Charles Braverman	Steve Wasserman & Jessica Klein	July 25, 1991	2191024	18.1
When Jack McKay is indicted on income tax evasion, Dylan goes out surfing in dangerous waters and is injured in a storm. The Walsh family take him to the hospital, but Jim is upset when he catches Brenda kissing Dylan. Meanwhile, Donna and David are dismayed to be partnered up in drama class to perform a scene from Romeo and Juliet. Kelly falls for a handsome volleyball player who likes her but for some reason won't have sex with her. Arthur Brooks plays Jack McKay in the flashback to Dylan's childhood, but Josh Taylor assumed the role in future episodes.
26	4	"Anaconda"	Daniel Attias	Jonathan Roberts	August 1, 1991	2191025	15.4
Jim suggests that Dylan visit his mother in Hawaii. Steve and Brandon organize after-dark poker games at the beach club, and the teens enjoy dressing up like high rollers of the past. But when a burglary occurs, their scheme is exposed and a penniless Dylan is fingered as the prime suspect. Meanwhile, Brenda and Donna go sunbathing hoping for the perfect tan, but a sleepy Brenda gets a case of sun-poisoning. Jennie Garth and Gabrielle Carteris do not appear in this episode.
27	5	"Play it Again, David"	Charles Braverman	Sherri Ziff	August 8, 1991	2191026	17.4
When Andrea persuades Brandon to hang out with a young boy, they discover a possible case of child abuse. David's dad and Kelly's mom meet and start dating when Jackie breaks a tooth, much to David's delight and Kelly's chagrin. Meanwhile, Brenda can't keep thoughts of Dylan out of her mind while he is in Hawaii.
28	6	"Pass/Not Pass"	Jefferson Kibbee	Allison Adler	August 15, 1991	2191027	16.1
Brandon has finally saved enough money to get his dream car and buys it against his father's advice; unfortunately it breaks down mere minutes after leaving the dealership. Angry and disappointed with his son's impetuous decision, Jim debates over whether to help him. Meanwhile, both Brenda and Andrea develop feelings for their acting teacher, sparking a physical altercation between the girls when he shows interest in Andrea.
29	7	"Camping Trip"	Jeff Melman	Karen Rosin	August 29, 1991	2191028	17.0
The gang decide to go on a parent-free camping trip, but neither weather nor cabin meets their expectations. The newlyweds honeymooning next door share their problems with the teens. Meanwhile, Dylan's drinking problem returns, but not before he works to save Brandon's life as he dangles helplessly over a cliff.
30	8	"Wild Fire"	Daniel Attias	Steve Wasserman & Jessica Klein	September 12, 1991	2191029	17.7
School is back in session for the students of West Beverly and new student Emily Valentine makes a big splash with the guys, especially Brandon and Dylan. The girls don't exactly take well to the interloper, especially jealous Brenda, who realizes she might want Dylan back after all. Meanwhile, Scott returns from Oklahoma and finds his friendship with newly-popular David considerably cooled.
31	9	"Ashes to Ashes"	Charles Braverman	Charles Rosin & Judi Ann Mason	September 19, 1991	2191030	19.0
The Blaze finds a new staff photographer, Robinson Ash III, who is delighted about getting the job, but not as thrilled with his welcome to Beverly Hills. Meanwhile, the Walshes try out a new home alarm system, which is more hindrance than help. A scheduled April repeat of this episode was pulled from the air without notice following the Los Angeles riots because it was supposedly too controversial.
32	10	"Necessity is a Mother"	Jefferson Kibbee	Steve Wasserman & Jessica Klein	September 26, 1991	2191031	16.5
Dylan's mother Iris makes a surprise visit to Beverly Hills, hoping to start fresh with her estranged son. Cindy hits it off with free-spirited Iris, but the strain of his mother's reappearance drives Dylan back to the bottle. Later Dylan and Iris reconcile and she tells him that she had left because his father drove her away and paid her a lot of money to stay out of his life. She took the money but never kept a penny of it, and now she's decided to give it to Dylan; she'll place it in a trust and ask Jim to look after it. Brandon decides to take Dylan to an A.A. meeting. Donna and Steve experiment with the stock market, and Donna turns out to have a surprising knack for picking successful stocks.
33	11	"Leading from the Heart"	Daniel Attias	Darren Star	October 10, 1991	2191032	15.9
A cute Walsh cousin who uses a wheelchair visits. He and Kelly hit it off, but Brenda isn't happy, since she's sure fickle Kelly will soon lose interest. Meanwhile, Brenda finally gets her driver's license, and David develops feelings for Donna. Gordon Currie and Phil Buckman later had recurring roles on the series.
34	12	"Down and Out (of District) in Beverly Hills"	Charles Braverman	Story by : Karen Rosin & Allison Adler; Teleplay by : Karen Rosin	October 17, 1991	2191033	15.0
Andrea's success in a teen journalism competition exposes the fact that she may be living out of district, which is further complicated by her grandmother's refusal to lie about her living situation. Meanwhile, Steve's new girlfriend may be more interested in his money than in him.
35	13	"Halloween"	Michael Katleman	Jonathan Roberts	October 31, 1991	2191034	16.6
Brandon and Emily take her two young cousins trick-or-treaing but lose them along the way. David and Scott decide to take part in an annual egg fight, a Halloween tradition for the former best friends. Meanwhile, Kelly narrowly escapes a sexual assault at a party.
36	14	"The Next 50 Years"	Daniel Attias	Karen Rosin & Charles Rosin	November 7, 1991	2191035	22.3
During Scott's surprise 16th-birthday party, an accidental shooting turns fatal. Meanwhile, Andrea grows jealous of Brandon's attention to Emily, and the gang grieves after a sudden death. This is the last appearance of Douglas Emerson as Scott Scanlon. James Eckhouse and Carol Potter do not appear in this episode.
37	15	"U4EA"	Charles Braverman	Allison Adler	November 14, 1991	2191036	20.8
The gang heads out to a 'not-so-legal' underground club, and Emily introduces Brandon to the world of drugs. Brandon's car goes through another stage in its life cycle. Meanwhile, Steve and Andrea have an adventurous night together.
38	16	"My Desperate Valentine"	Jeff Melman	Michael Swerdlick	November 21, 1991	2191037	28.7
Emily's desperate desire to win back Brandon's affection spirals into a twisted obsession that puts the entire Walsh family at risk. Meanwhile, Brenda worries that she and Dylan spend too much time making out and urges him to attend cultural events with her.
39	17	"Chuckie's Back"	Bradley Gross	Story by : Steve Wasserman & Jessica Klein & Michael Swerdlick; Teleplay by : Steve Wasserman & Jessica Klein	December 12, 1991	2191038	18.2
Samantha Sanders is elated when producers approach her to do a reunion show of her old sitcom; the only problem is that she needs Steve to befriend her TV son Chuckie, which proves difficult. A fight with Chuckie and a suspension from school peak his desire to find his birth parents. Meanwhile, Donna decides to attend the dance with David, despite him being a sophomore.
40	18	"A Walsh Family Christmas"	Darren Star	Darren Star	December 19, 1991	2191039	22.6
Steve arrives in New Mexico and meets his grandfather, who tells him his birth mother's fate. Meanwhile, the Walshes enjoy everyone's company at Casa Walsh, including Santa. Dylan revives his relationship with his father by visiting him in jail. This episode is 90-minute long (with commercials). On its original broadcast, Drexell's Class gave up its time slot to make room for this episode.
41	19	"Fire and Ice"	Jeff Melman	Carl Sautter	January 9, 1992	2191040	19.6
While preparing for an ice-hockey match Brandon meets Trish, a career figure-skater with Olympic aspirations. Sparks fly, but romance and skating don't mix. Meanwhile, Brenda finds that sales can be a backstabbing business when her own boss starts stealing her commissions.
42	20	"A Competitive Edge"	David Carson	Story by : Douglas Brooks West; Teleplay by : Charles Rosin & Jonathan Roberts	January 23, 1992	2191042	18.7
Brandon goes undercover for The Blaze, hoping to expose steroid use within the athletics team. Unfortunately, his exposé threatens to shine light on more than a corrupt athletics department. Meanwhile, Brenda's minor car accident becomes a major problem for Jim.
43	21	"Everybody's Talkin' 'Bout It"	Daniel Attias	Karen Rosin & Charles Rosin	February 6, 1992	2191043	19.0
Andrea heads up an initiative to introduce condoms into the school and the controversial issue leads to problems among the tight-knit group of friends. Some support, some oppose, and some, like Donna's mother, just use the issue to further their own desires. Meanwhile, Jackie has startling news for her own daughter.
44	22	"And Baby Makes Five"	Bill D'Elia	Steve Wasserman & Jessica Klein	February 13, 1992	2191044	16.7
Kelly's decision to confide in her friends about her mother's pregnancy wreaks major havoc in Mel and Jackie's relationship. Mel was unaware that Jackie's pregnant and he was planning on asking her to marry him. Brenda looks forward to a romantic Valentine's Day with Dylan, who has an unusual evening planned for them. Meanwhile, Andrea displays an amazing knack for picking winning horses during a trip to the race track with Nat.
45	23	"Cardio-Funk"	Daniel Attias	Steve Wasserman & Jessica Klein	February 27, 1992	2191041	21.3
Dylan and Brenda's relationship is put to the test when a friend from Dylan's past shows up and starts leaning on Dylan more and more. Brenda is tempted by a cute college boy, especially since Dylan is paying more attention to his old friend than he is her. Meanwhile, Nat purchases a karaoke machine for the Peach Pit which is an initial success, but the novelty quickly wears off.
46	24	"The Pit and the Pendulum"	Daniel Attias	Larry Barber & Paul Barber	March 19, 1992	2191045	17.2
When a mall development project places the future of The Peach Pit in jeopardy, Brandon stages a protest in the hopes of saving his favorite hang-out from demolition. Meanwhile, the teens attend a college party, but Brandon forgets to dress according to theme.
47	25	"Meeting Mr. Pony"	Bradley Gross	Story by : Jonathan Lemkin; Teleplay by : Darren Star & Charles Rosin & Karen Rosin & Jonathan Lemkin	April 2, 1992	2191046	20.9
During a late night, after-hours study session, the Peach Pit is robbed and Brenda is there to face the robber. She puts on a brave front for friends and family, but secretly suffers from night terrors and flashbacks.
48	26	"Things to Do on a Rainy Day"	Bethany Rooney	Jonathan Roberts & Maria Semple	April 23, 1992	2191047	19.5
When a popular R&B band comes to town, the gang tries to win tickets over the radio, but their efforts do not pan out. Music lover David finds out which hotel the band is staying at and the group decides to play groupies for a day by tracking them down at their hotel. Unfortunately, Donna finds more than the band when she catches her mother in a compromising position. Meanwhile, the guys (sans David) decide to hire a stripper for the evening, but their plans are foiled when Andrea barges into their private party. This episode features a special appearance by Color Me Badd.
49	27	"Mexican Standoff"	Bradley Gross	Steve Wasserman & Jessica Klein	April 30, 1992	2191048	15.8
Brenda and Dylan plan a trip to Mexico, but their plans are foiled when Jim forbids her to go. She sneaks off anyway, but trouble at customs alerts her father to her disobedience. Meanwhile, Kelly hits it off with one of the men building her mother's wedding canopy, while Donna frets over her parents' marital problems. Grant Show makes his debut as Jake Hanson, setting up the spin-off Melrose Place. While helping Brenda with her scheme, Donna mentions a troublemaking cousin. This could very well be Gina Kincaid, who does not appear until season nine.
50	28	"Wedding Bell Blues"	Charles Braverman	Darren Star	May 7, 1992	2191049	21.4
Jim goes to Mexico to fetch Brenda and forbids her from seeing Dylan... permanently. When plumbing problems force Jackie to cancel her wedding, the Walshes offer to host it at their house. Donna mopes because as Kelly's mother prepares for her nuptials, her own parents are mulling divorce. Meanwhile, Andrea nurses hurt feelings when her wedding invitation fails to arrive. A then-unknown Denise Richards appears as the girl Steve walks off with. After this episode, Jennie Garth guest starred on the pilot episode of Melrose Place on July 8, 1992. Tori Spelling, Ian Ziering and Brian Austin Green also made appearances.

== Reception ==
=== Ratings ===
No. in series	No. in season	Title	Air date	Time slot (ET)	Rating	Share	Viewers (millions)	Ref(s)
23	1	"Beach Blanket Brandon"	July 11, 1991	Thursday 9:00 p.m.	11.6	—N/a	—N/a	
24	2	"The Party Fish"	July 18, 1991	Thursday 9:00 p.m.	10.0	—N/a	—N/a	
25	3	"Summer Storm"	July 25, 1991	Thursday 9:00 p.m.	11.6	—N/a	—N/a	
26	4	"Anaconda"	August 1, 1991	Thursday 9:00 p.m.	10.1	—N/a	—N/a	
27	5	"Play it Again, David"	August 8, 1991	Thursday 9:00 p.m.	11.1	—N/a	—N/a	
28	6	"Pass/Not Pass"	August 15, 1991	Thursday 9:00 p.m.	10.1	—N/a	—N/a	
29	7	"Camping Trip"	August 29, 1991	Thursday 9:00 p.m.	10.5	—N/a	—N/a	
30	8	"Wild Fire"	September 12, 1990	Thursday 9:00 p.m.	11.5	—N/a	—N/a	
31	9	"Ashes to Ashes"	September 19, 1991	Thursday 9:00 p.m.	11.9	19	—N/a	
32	10	"Necessity is a Mother"	September 26, 1991	Thursday 9:00 p.m.	10.6	17	—N/a	
33	11	"Leading from the Heart"	October 10, 1991	Thursday 9:00 p.m.	10.4	16	—N/a	
34	12	"Down and Out (of District) in Beverly Hills"	October 17, 1991	Thursday 9:00 p.m.	10.2	15	15.0	
35	13	"Halloween"	October 31, 1991	Thursday 9:00 p.m.	10.9	—N/a	—N/a	
36	14	"The Next 50 Years"	November 7, 1991	Thursday 9:00 p.m.	13.6	—N/a	—N/a	
37	15	"U4EA"	November 14, 1991	Thursday 9:00 p.m.	13.0	—N/a	—N/a	
38	16	"My Desperate Valentine"	November 21, 1991	Thursday 9:00 p.m.	13.4	—N/a	—N/a	
39	17	"Chuckie's Back"	December 12, 1991	Thursday 9:00 p.m.	11.8	—N/a	—N/a	
40	18	"A Walsh Family Christmas"	December 19, 1991	Thursday 8:30 p.m.	13.8	21	—N/a	
41	19	"Fire and Ice"	January 9, 1992	Thursday 9:00 p.m.	11.8	17	—N/a	
42	20	"A Competitive Edge"	January 23, 1992	Thursday 9:00 p.m.	11.8	18	—N/a	
43	21	"Everybody's Talkin' 'Bout It"	February 6, 1992	Thursday 9:00 p.m.	11.8	17	—N/a	
44	22	"And Baby Makes Five"	February 13, 1992	Thursday 9:00 p.m.	11.0	16	—N/a	
45	23	"Cardio-Funk"	February 27, 1992	Thursday 9:00 p.m.	13.4	20	—N/a	
46	24	"The Pit and the Pendulum"	March 19, 1992	Thursday 9:00 p.m.	11.2	18	—N/a	
47	25	"Meeting Mr. Pony"	April 2, 1992	Thursday 9:00 p.m.	13.2	21	—N/a	
48	26	"Things to Do on a Rainy Day"	April 23, 1992	Thursday 9:00 p.m.	12.7	20	—N/a	
49	27	"Mexican Standoff"	April 30, 1992	Thursday 9:00 p.m.	10.8	16	—N/a	
50	28	"Wedding Bell Blues"	May 7, 1992	Thursday 9:00 p.m.	14.1	21	—N/a	

== Home media ==
Season two was released on DVD in 2007 in Regions 1, 2 and 4. It is currently available to stream via Paramount+, but some episodes are missing due to copyright reasons. The missing episodes are episodes 6, 8, 14, 17, 18, 23, 26, and 27.

The Complete Second Season
Set details		Special features
28 episodes; 1305 minutes (Region 1); 1252 minutes (Region 2); 8-disc set; 1.33:1 aspect ratio; Languages: English (Dolby Digital 2.0 Surround); Subtitles: English, Dutch, Norwegian, Danish, Finnish, Swedish and French (Region 1)		"Meet the Walshes"; "Everything You Need to Know About Beverly Hills, 90210 season 2"; "Our Favorite Valentine"
Release dates		"Meet the Walshes"; "Everything You Need to Know About Beverly Hills, 90210 season 2"; "Our Favorite Valentine"
United States	United Kingdom	"Meet the Walshes"; "Everything You Need to Know About Beverly Hills, 90210 season 2"; "Our Favorite Valentine"
May 1, 2007	May 14, 2007	"Meet the Walshes"; "Everything You Need to Know About Beverly Hills, 90210 season 2"; "Our Favorite Valentine"
