= Vincent Young =

Vincent Young may refer to:

- Vince Young (born 1983), American football quarterback
- Vincent Young (actor) (born 1964), American actor
