= Beverly Hills, 90210 season 3 =

Beverly Hills, 90210
- Season 3
- DVD cover
- Starring: Jason Priestley Shannen Doherty Jennie Garth Ian Ziering Gabrielle Carteris Luke Perry Brian Austin Green Tori Spelling Carol Potter James Eckhouse
- No. of episodes: 30

Release
- Original network: Fox
- Original release: July 15, 1992 – May 19, 1993

Season chronology
- ← Previous; Season 2 Next → Season 4

The third season of Beverly Hills, 90210, an American teen drama television series aired from July 15, 1992 on Fox and concluded on May 19, 1993 after 30 episodes. Issues such as sex, infidelity, relationships, child molestation, hit and runs, racial discrimination, gang violence, expulsion, pollution, gambling, drug abuse, eating disorders, body image, protest, grief, and relationship abuse are pushed front and center.

== Overview ==
The finish line is in sight for the Walsh twins and their friends as they begin their senior year, but there are still plenty of challenges in the road that will keep everyone on their toes before they toss the caps.

== Cast ==
=== Starring ===
- Jason Priestley as Brandon Walsh
- Shannen Doherty as Brenda Walsh
- Jennie Garth as Kelly Taylor
- Ian Ziering as Steve Sanders
- Gabrielle Carteris as Andrea Zuckerman
- Luke Perry as Dylan McKay
- Brian Austin Green as David Silver
- Tori Spelling as Donna Martin
- Carol Potter as Cindy Walsh
- James Eckhouse as Jim Walsh

=== Recurring ===
- Joe E. Tata as Nat Bussichio
- Ann Gillespie as Jackie Taylor
- Dana Barron as Nikki Witt
- Denise Dowse as Vice Principal Yvonne Teasley
- Mark Kiely as Gil Meyers
- Josh Taylor as Jack McKay

== Episodes ==
No. overall	No. in season	Title	Directed by	Written by	Original release date	Prod. code	U.S. viewers (millions)
51	1	"Misery Loves Company"	Jeffrey Melman	Steve Wasserman & Jessica Klein	July 15, 1992	2192050	16.7
Brandon returns to work for the summer at the Beverly Hills Beach Club, with Andrea now working there as the child-care supervisor. Meanwhile, Brenda defies her parents and continues to secretly see Dylan behind everyone's back. When Brenda gets caught in the act when Jim and Cindy run into Brenda with Dylan at the beach club, she runs away and into Dylan's house. This episode aired back-to-back with Melrose Place, which featured an appearance by Jennie Garth.
52	2	"The Twins, the Trustee, and the Very Big Trip"	David Carson	Charles Rosin	July 22, 1992	2192051	15.8
Brenda and Dylan find that their living arrangements are too close for comfort but Brenda is too stubborn to admit she's unhappy. Kelly decides to bail on her trip to Paris for the summer, deciding instead to stay home with her newborn sister. Jim decides to send Brenda in Kelly's place and puts pressure on Dylan to encourage her to take the overseas trip. Jennie Garth, Ian Ziering and Brian Austin Green also appeared on that night's episode of Melrose Place.
53	3	"Too Little, Too Late/Paris 75001"	Daniel Attias	Maria Semple & Jonathan Roberts (Too Little, Too Late); Karen Rosin (Paris 75001)	July 29, 1992	2192052	13.2
Brenda and Donna adjust to living in Paris but Brenda's French isn't as good as she thinks it is, and the girls end up eating some questionable food at La Champagne. Andrea counsels a deaf child who has difficulty adjusting to summer camp. Meanwhile, Dylan and Kelly flirt with each other and Brandon becomes jealous of Andrea's new boyfriend. James Eckhouse does not appear in this episode. Randy Spelling (Kenny) is the son of executive producer Aaron and brother of Tori, and later had a second recurring role as Steve's brother Ryan.
54	4	"Sex, Lies and Volleyball/Photo Fini"	Jeffrey Melman	Chris Brancato & Kenneth Biller (Sex, Lies and Volleyball); Karen Rosin (Photo Fini)	August 5, 1992	2192053	13.2
Donna feels left out because Brenda and her classmates can speak fluent French. Donna embarks on a modeling career. Steve finds the perfect partner for both romance and volleyball. Kelly and Dylan team up for the volleyball tournament and also spend an afternoon babysitting baby Erin together. Meanwhile, David meets a young girl, Nikki, who expresses an interest in both his music and him.
55	5	"Shooting Star/American in Paris"	Daniel Attias	Steve Wasserman & Jessica Klein (Shooting Star); Karen Rosin (American in Paris)	August 12, 1992	2192054	16.2
Kelly and Dylan spend a romantic afternoon jet skiing in the waves at Paradise Cove. Brenda develops a crush on a young American named Rick (Dean Cain), who mistakes her for a native Parisian. Meanwhile, Brandon tries to help a homeless war veteran, David hires Steve to manage his music career, and Andrea becomes frantic when Cameron, her deaf camper, goes missing.
56	6	"Castles in the Sand"	Paul Lazarus	Ann Donahue	August 19, 1992	2192055	17.1
Brenda and Donna return from Paris and are welcomed home with a big party. Brandon grows annoyed with Brooke's constant racist comments and their relationship suffers. Meanwhile, Steve schmoozes the beach club into giving David a chance to show off his musical talents to all of the Beverly Hills elite. Kelly and Dylan decide to not tell Brenda about their summer fling and keep it as a secret.
57	7	"A Song of Myself"	Jeffrey Melman	Chris Brancato & Kenneth Biller	September 9, 1992	2192056	16.6
It's the beginning of senior year at West Beverly for the gang (sans David). Andrea accuses the new English teacher and Blaze faculty advisor, Gil Meyers, of sexism, when he names Brandon the new editor of the paper. David's summer fling, Nikki enrolls at school, and becomes fast friends with Donna. Meanwhile, Brenda and Steve become "senior buddies" to two incoming freshmen, and Brenda finds herself paired with Sue Scanlon, whose brother's death, Scott Scanlon, has had no small impact on the girl. Kelly becomes depressed due to constantly seeing Brenda and Dylan together.
58	8	"The Back Story"	Bradley M. Gross	Karen Rosin	September 16, 1992	2192057	14.3
Beth Nielson, from the tabloid television show Back Story is in town, and she enlists the help of Brenda to make a documentary about West Beverly High. A naive Brenda agrees to be interviewed, not realizing how the show will twist her words and take them out of context. Meanwhile, a West Beverly alum offers Steve a "legacy key" to the school, which will give him unfettered access to the school's computers.
59	9	"Highwire"	Bethany Rooney	Star Frohman	September 23, 1992	2192058	16.2
With graduation on the horizon, the teens of West Beverly are stressed about where to go to college. The Walshes announce only one twin can go to an out-of-state college, which leads to some major fighting between the siblings. Kelly loses it when David walks in on her in the shower. Meanwhile, Steve gives more thought to using the legacy key, and Brenda feels Dylan slipping away.
60	10	"Home and Away"	Jack Bender	Chip Johannessen	October 7, 1992	2192059	15.6
When two students from rival school Shaw High are shot to death by gang members during a football game, West Beverly decides to forfeit their own game against Shaw's team. Brandon meets a journalist from Shaw, and the two reporters decide to use the power of the press to put a stop to the violence. Kelly hopes to see her father again. Meanwhile, Sue Scanlon starts showing an interest in David, which irritates Donna but pleases David. Dylan invites Kelly to go to the Pigskin Prom with him and Brenda.
61	11	"A Presumption of Innocence"	Bethany Rooney	Karen Rosin	October 21, 1992	2192060	16.4
Sue Scanlon accuses Gil Meyers of sexual misconduct, which leads to his suspension. Andrea offers her support to the misguided teen and finds there's more to the story than Sue is telling. After surfing in polluted waters, Dylan contracts both an infection and a desire to help clean up the bay. James Eckhouse and Carol Potter do not appear in this episode.
62	12	"Destiny Rides Again"	Christopher Hibler	Steve Wasserman & Jessica Klein	November 4, 1992	2192061	19.9
During a trip to the video store, Brenda runs into Rick (Dean Cain), her fling from Paris. She goes out with Rick behind Dylan's back, but acts indignant when Dylan reveals to her that he had his own summer fling. Tragedy literally strikes Andrea when she's seriously injured in a hit-and-run accident. Nikki gets tickets to a televised AIDS benefit, and she and Brandon are interviewed by Rosie O'Donnell on the air. David and Donna consider sleeping together, and Steve puts his education in jeopardy when he decides to use the legacy key. Meanwhile, Kelly decides to step aside from her friends and concentrate on herself but doesn't expect to see Dylan with a proposition that will change their lives forever.
63	13	"Rebel with a Cause"	Daniel Attias	Star Frohman	November 11, 1992	2192062	19.7
Brenda assures Dylan that he's free to date whomever he likes but when she and Rick (Dean Cain) run into him and Kelly, Brenda reevaluates her position. Steve and Herbert grow apprehensive as the police show up at West Beverly to investigate their crime. Meanwhile, Andrea is released from the hospital but has to use a wheelchair.
64	14	"Wild Horses"	Bobby Roth	Chris Brancato & Kenneth Biller	November 18, 1992	2192063	16.9
Unable to deal with all the drama at home, Dylan hits the road and meets a beautiful ranch owner named Anne, whose free-spirited life is very appealing to him. Back in Beverly Hills, the investigation surrounding the computer break-in continues, and a fearful Steve puts pressure on Herbert to take the heat. Kelly and Brenda get into a fight for Dylan. While Brandon and Nikki run into Nikki's ex-boyfriend Dennis "Diesel" Stone who likes to abuse women when he doesn't get his way. He slaps Nikki in the face after she calls him Dennis instead of Diesel. He tries to go further until Brandon intervenes and punches Diesel in the face saving Nikki, then both Brandon and Nikki leave Diesel's house and then goes back to Walsh's house to put ice on his bruised hand. David Arquette makes a guest appearance as Nikki's ex-boyfriend, Diesel.
65	15	"The Kindness of Strangers"	Richard Lang	Steve Wasserman & Jessica Klein	November 25, 1992	2192064	16.2
Brandon encounters Jack Canner, the homeless war veteran he met over the summer, and invites him to join his family for Thanksgiving. Unfortunately, father Jim takes offense to the war vet's political choices. Meanwhile, Steve's mother goes to bat for him at school, and works to have his expulsion reversed. Dylan returns to Beverly Hills and greets both Brenda and Kelly with kisses. The video for Shanice's "Saving Forever for You," featuring an appearance by Brian Austin Green, plays over the closing credits to promote the 90210 soundtrack.
66	16	"It's a Totally Happening Life"	Richard Lang	Karen Rosin & Charles Rosin	December 16, 1992	2192066	15.8
In a nod to It's a Wonderful Life, two guardian angels, Clarence and Miriam, watch over the gang and protect them from a bus crash that threatens to kill them all. Meanwhile, Andrea gets accepted to Yale, Cindy catches Brandon and Nikki in bed, and Dylan is ordered to choose between Brenda and Kelly by New Year's Eve. David decides that he will takes extra courses so he can graduate early with his friends.
67	17	"The Game Is Chicken"	Jack Bender	Chip Johannessen	January 6, 1993	2192065	16.2
Steve and Brandon get involved in the world of high-stakes drag racing, and their dangerous endeavor leads them to the very person who might be responsible for Andrea's accident. David's determination to graduate early means he has little time to work in the D.J. booth. Meanwhile, Brenda and Kelly agree to a double date with two Princeton men, only to find that their dates are not exactly the stuff dreams are made of. The video for Jeremy Jordan's "The Right Kind of Love" plays over the closing credits. Tori Spelling appears in the clip.
68	18	"Midlife... Now What?"	Robert Becker	Lana Freistat Melman	January 13, 1993	2192067	16.6
Looking for a little primping and pampering, the girls of West Beverly head out to a Montecito Spa for the weekend. Jackie and Cindy come too, and both women fear their husbands may not be staying faithful to them. Kelly worries that her mother's insecurity may lead her back to drugs, and begins to feel insecure herself. Meanwhile, Brandon delves even further into gambling, and Dylan's romantic problems seem unimportant when he learns his father is being released from prison.
69	19	"Back in the High Life Again"	Bill D'Elia	Steve Wasserman & Jessica Klein	January 27, 1993	2192068	N/A
Jack McKay decides to throw a party at the Bel Age hotel to celebrate his early release from prison. Dylan invites both Brenda and Kelly and eventually chooses Kelly over Brenda. Mel and Jackie's marriage crumbles, leaving David afraid that he'll no longer have access to his baby sister. Dylan and Kelly incur Brenda's rage when they tell her about their summer fling and she cuts them both out of her life.
70	20	"Parental Guidance Recommended"	Gwen Arner	Chip Johannessen	February 3, 1993	2192069	16.6
Iris McKay arrives in town to discuss dissolving Dylan's trust fund with Jim. She's against the idea but Dylan and Jack lay the pressure on hard. Iris also takes time to meet with Brenda, who is depressed over losing both Dylan and Kelly. Meanwhile, David and Steve meet after school with Curtis Bray, the famous but sleazy and debauched owner of Icon Records, with a demo tape to get a recording contract for David. However, Steve is shown to be a poor negotiator, and his sycopathic treatment of David visibly annoys Bray, who privately offers David a record with Icon Records, but only if he fires Steve. David decides to accept the deal, but Steve takes the news very badly and ends both his business and friendship with David. Elsewhere, Brandon is enjoying the high life, as he continues to place large bets.
71	21	"Dead End"	Jeff Melman	Star Frohman	February 10, 1993	2192070	19.7
Jack and Dylan begin a new life together, living aboard a yacht with Dylan's enormous trust fund at their disposal. On the surface everything seems perfect, but Jack has some dangerous enemies. So does Brandon, whose unpaid gambling debts lead to some frightening visit and threat from his bookie, Duke, over a $500 debt. Meanwhile, Andrea and Jordan go on a date, Dylan and Kelly consummate their relationship, and Brenda and Donna take a self-defense class.
72	22	"The Child Is Father to the Man"	James Whitmore Jr.	Karen Rosin & Charles Rosin	February 17, 1993	2192071	18.7
In the wake of his father's death, Dylan grapples with his personal demons while trying to elude the reporters camping out on his lawn. Dylan eventually learns the shocking truth about his father and about his fiancee Christine when she and a few FBI agents private tell Dylan about Jack's undercover work in trying to arrest a mobster associate of Jack's. Kelly feels uncomfortable when Brenda invites Dylan to stay with the Walshes. David postpones a recording session at Icon Records to attend Jack McKay's funeral and arrives just in time to find Dylan about to take a drink. Meanwhile, Brandon's losing streak continues as his gambling addiction spirals out of control. The video for "Love Is" by Vanessa Williams and Brian McKnight plays over the closing credits.
73	23	"Duke's Bad Boy"	Robert Becker	Jessica Klein	March 3, 1993	2192072	16.0
Brandon's out of control gambling debts are mounting up and his bookie, Duke, is getting impatient and wants $1,500 of losses paid up by the end of the week, or else.... Brandon goes to extreme lengths to pay his bill by hiring another bookie at school to place bets, and his desperation leads to violence. Kelly feels that Dylan is slipping away from her, and her insecurity leads to an unhealthy obsession with her appearance. Meanwhile, David's hack of a recording manager Serge, continues to ignore David's hip-hop music style and insists that David can to better by making him record a trite ballard. David goes along with it. But Curtis Bray does not like the new tune and outright fires David from Icon Records. Elsewhere, Andrea convinces a depressed Dylan to write a story about his experience with loss.
74	24	"Perfectly Perfect"	Bethany Rooney	Gillian Horvath	March 24, 1993	2192073	19.1
Kelly's obsession with her weight leads to an addiction to diet pills that puts her health in imminent danger. Her friends plan a surprise party for her 18th birthday but the pills make her so paranoid that she thinks everyone is against her. Meanwhile, Brandon and Steve compete on a televised dating show for a date with the lovely Celeste Lundy.
75	25	"Senior Poll"	Christopher Hibler	Chip Johannessen	April 7, 1993	2192074	15.0
Senior superlatives are being awarded at West Beverly and most of the gang wins an award. Kelly wins Most Beautiful but instead of lending her a much needed confidence boost, the award leads her to believe that everyone judges her solely by her looks. Brenda feels left out that she didn't win a superlative and decides to apply to the University of Minnesota. Meanwhile, Steve and Brandon attend a Lakers basketball game, where Steve gets the chance to win $10,000. The video for "Why" by Cathy Dennis, featuring an appearance by Jason Priestley, plays over the closing credits.
76	26	"She Came in Through the Bathroom Window"	Jason Priestley	Ken Stringer	April 28, 1993	2192075	14.4
It's Senior Ditch Day and the girls along with David, decide to spend it at Magic Mountain. What is supposed to be a fun day turns into a nightmare when Kelly's wallet is stolen and Donna is mugged. Meanwhile, Brandon encounters problems of his own when he has to cover for Nat by working at the Peach Pit, and his car is stolen by a clever female con artist who dupes both Dylan and Steve into tagging along with her to help search for Burt Reynolds to appease a tour group. This episode features a special appearance by Burt Reynolds.
77	27	"A Night to Remember"	Richard Lang	Steve Wasserman & Jessica Klein	May 5, 1993	2192076	17.0
The students of West Beverly are horrified to learn that the school board has pushed through a measure that will bar any student found drunk at the prom from graduation. Everyone scrambles for dates, and the Walsh twins find themselves dateless. Meanwhile, Mel Silver serves champagne at a pre-prom gathering, leaving waif-like Donna vulnerable to its effects.
78	28	"Something in the Air"	James Whitmore Jr.	Steve Wasserman & Jessica Klein	May 12, 1993	2192077	16.9
Donna must attend a disciplinary hearing regarding her activity at prom night and is denied participation in commencement ceremonies. Her own mother refuses to stand by her, but Brandon and the others go to bat for their friend. At Gil Meyers suggestion, they planned a school wide finals walk-out and a mass demonstration in front of the school board. This is Michael Durrell's first appearance as Dr. John Martin, Donna's father.
79	29	"Commencement"	Daniel Attias	Karen & Charles Rosin	May 19, 1993	2192078A	22.2
80	30	"Commencement"	Daniel Attias	Karen & Charles Rosin	May 19, 1993	2192078B	22.2
As graduation approaches, the gang of West Beverly make their final decisions about the future while reminiscing about the past. Brandon is sad when Brenda announces her decision to attend the University of Minnesota. Andrea worries that she'll have to turn down Yale. Meanwhile, Mrs. Teasley finds out about Steve's anonymous donation. Dylan's hippie mother, Iris, pays another unannounced and unwelcome visit. The gang takes a look back at the last three years of their life, cherishing the past and excited for the future. They spend an evening in the Hollywood Hills, camping under the stars and forever memorializing the class of 1993. The actor portraying Bill Taylor is uncredited. John Reilly later assumed the role.

== Soundtrack ==
Beverly Hills, 90210: The Soundtrack was released as season three was airing, with several songs from it featured in the show's closing credits.

== Ratings ==
Season	Timeslot	Season premiere	Season finale	TV season	Rank	Viewers (in millions)
3rd	Wednesday 9/8C	July 15, 1992	May 19, 1993	1992–1993	N/A	18.3

== Home media ==
The DVD release of season three was released in Regions 1, 2 and 4.

The Complete Third Season
Set details		Special features
30 episodes; 1371 minutes (Region 1); 1316 minutes (Region 2); 8-disc set; 1.33:1 aspect ratio; Languages: English (Dolby Digital 2.0 Surround); Subtitles: English, Dutch, Norwegian, Danish, Finnish, Swedish and French (Region 1)		"7 Minutes in Heaven"; "Everything You Need to Know About Beverly Hills, 90210 season 3"; "The World According to Nat"
Release dates		"7 Minutes in Heaven"; "Everything You Need to Know About Beverly Hills, 90210 season 3"; "The World According to Nat"
United States	United Kingdom	"7 Minutes in Heaven"; "Everything You Need to Know About Beverly Hills, 90210 season 3"; "The World According to Nat"
December 11, 2007	March 24, 2008	"7 Minutes in Heaven"; "Everything You Need to Know About Beverly Hills, 90210 season 3"; "The World According to Nat"
