= Beverly Hills, 90210 =

American teen drama series (1990–2000)

- Genre: Teen drama; Soap opera
- Created by: Darren Star
- Starring: Jason Priestley; Shannen Doherty; Jennie Garth; Ian Ziering; Gabrielle Carteris; Luke Perry; Brian Austin Green; Douglas Emerson; Tori Spelling; Carol Potter; James Eckhouse; Joe E. Tata; Mark Damon Espinoza; Kathleen Robertson; Tiffani-Amber Thiessen; Jamie Walters; Hilary Swank; Vincent Young; Lindsay Price; Daniel Cosgrove; Vanessa Marcil
- Theme music composer: John E. Davis
- Composers: Jay Gruska; Gary S. Scott
- Country of origin: United States
- Original language: English
- No. of seasons: 10
- No. of episodes: 293 (list of episodes)

Production
- Executive producers: Aaron Spelling; E. Duke Vincent; Charles Rosin; Darren Star; Steve Wasserman; Jessica Klein; Paul Waigner; Larry Mollin; Jason Priestley; Laurie McCarthy; John Eisendrath; Doug Steinberg; Michael Braverman; Brian Austin Green; Ian Ziering
- Camera setup: Film; Single-camera
- Running time: 45–95 minutes
- Production companies: 90210 Productions; Spelling Television

Original release
- Network: Fox
- Release: October 4, 1990 – May 17, 2000

Related
- Melrose Place; 90210; BH90210

Beverly Hills, 90210 (often referred to as 90210) is an American teen drama TV series created by Darren Star and produced by Aaron Spelling via his production company Spelling Television. The series ran for 10 seasons on Fox from October 4, 1990, to May 17, 2000, and is the first of six television series in the Beverly Hills, 90210 franchise. The series follows the lives of a group of friends living in Beverly Hills, California, as they transition from high school to college and into the adult world. "90210" refers to one of the city's five ZIP codes.

The initial premise of the show was based on the adjustment and culture shock that twins Brandon (Jason Priestley) and Brenda Walsh (Shannen Doherty) experienced when they and their parents, Jim (James Eckhouse) and Cindy (Carol Potter), moved from Minneapolis, Minnesota, to Beverly Hills, California. In addition to chronicling the characters' friendships and romantic relationships, the show addressed topical issues such as sex, date rape, homophobia, animal rights, alcoholism, drug abuse, domestic violence, eating disorders, racism, antisemitism, teenage suicide, teenage pregnancy, and AIDS.

After poor ratings during its first season, the series gained popularity during the summer of 1991, when Fox aired a special "summer season" of the show while most other series were in reruns. Viewership increased dramatically, and 90210 became one of Fox's top shows when it returned that fall. The show became an international pop culture phenomenon with its cast members, particularly Priestley and Luke Perry, who became teen idols; the series also made actresses Doherty and Jennie Garth household names in the United States. The show is credited with creating or popularizing the teen soap genre that many other successful television shows followed in the years to come.

The show had many cast changes; Garth, Tori Spelling, Brian Austin Green, and Ian Ziering were the only actors to appear during its entire run and appeared on the first episode of the spin-off Melrose Place. On February 27, 2019, it was announced that a six-episode reboot had been ordered by Fox and that the show would simply be titled BH90210. The revival premiered on Fox on August 7, 2019, and was cancelled on November 7, 2019.

== Series overview ==
Beverly Hills, 90210 series overview
Season	Episodes	Originally released	
Season	Episodes	First released	Last released
1	22	October 4, 1990	May 9, 1991
2	28	July 11, 1991	May 7, 1992
3	30	July 15, 1992	May 19, 1993
4	32	September 8, 1993	May 25, 1994
5	32	September 7, 1994	May 24, 1995
6	32	September 13, 1995	May 22, 1996
7	32	August 21, 1996	May 21, 1997
8	32	September 10, 1997	May 20, 1998
9	26	September 16, 1998	May 19, 1999
10	27	September 8, 1999	May 17, 2000

The series begins with the introduction of the Walsh family—Jim, Cindy, Brandon, and Brenda—who have recently moved from Minneapolis, Minnesota, to Beverly Hills, California, as a result of Jim's job promotion. In the first episode, Brandon and Brenda begin attending West Beverly Hills High School, where they befriend several classmates: the self-centered and promiscuous Kelly Taylor, carefree and spoiled Steve Sanders, smart and driven Andrea Zuckerman, ditzy and virtuous Donna Martin, brooding loner Dylan McKay, and younger and naive students David Silver and Scott Scanlon. The show follows the siblings as they bear witness and take part in the dramatic lives that their wealthy and privileged peers lead.

== Characters ==
Character	Actor	Seasons									
Character	Actor	1	2	3	4	5	6	7	8	9	10
Brandon Walsh	Jason Priestley	Main (Note: Priestley departs in "Brandon Leaves" (ep. 9.5).)	Main	Main	Main	Main	Main	Main	Main	Main	Guest
Brenda Walsh	Shannen Doherty	Main	Main	Main	Main						
Kelly Taylor	Jennie Garth	Main	Main	Main	Main	Main	Main	Main	Main	Main	Main
Steve Sanders	Ian Ziering	Main	Main	Main	Main	Main	Main	Main	Main	Main	Main
Andrea Zuckerman	Gabrielle Carteris	Main	Main	Main	Main	Main	Guest		Guest		Guest
David Silver	Brian Austin Green	Main	Main	Main	Main	Main	Main	Main	Main	Main	Main
Scott Scanlon	Douglas Emerson	Main	Recurring								
Cindy Walsh	Carol Potter	Main	Main	Main	Main	Main	Guest		Guest		
Donna Martin	Tori Spelling	Main	Main	Main	Main	Main	Main	Main	Main	Main	Main
Jim Walsh	James Eckhouse	Main	Main	Main	Main	Main	Guest	Guest	Guest		
Dylan McKay	Luke Perry	Main (Note: Perry is added to the cast in "The Green Room" (ep. 1.2). He departs in "One Wedding and a Funeral" (ep. 6.10).)	Main	Main	Main	Main	Main			Main (Note: Perry returns from "You Say Goodbye, I Say Hello" (ep. 9.7), credited in the opening credits as "special guest star".)	Main
Jesse Vasquez	Mark Damon Espinoza				Recurring	Main					
Valerie Malone	Tiffani-Amber Thiessen					Main (Note: Thiessen departs in "You Say Goodbye, I Say Hello" (ep. 9.7).)	Main	Main	Main	Main	Guest
Nat Bussichio	Joe E. Tata	Recurring	Recurring	Recurring	Recurring	Recurring	Main (Note: After "Tainted Love" (ep. 10.13), Tata is credited only in episodes that he appears.)	Main	Main	Main	Main
Ray Pruit	Jamie Walters					Recurring	Main (Note: Walters departs in "Courting" (ep. 6.13). He returns as a guest star in "Ray of Hope" (ep. 6.30).)	Guest			
Clare Arnold	Kathleen Robertson				Recurring	Recurring	Main	Main			
Carly Reynolds	Hilary Swank								Main (Note: Swank departs in "The Elephant's Father" (ep. 8.17).)		
Noah Hunter	Vincent Young								Main	Main	Main
Janet Sosna	Lindsay Price								Recurring	Main	Main
Matt Durning	Daniel Cosgrove									Main (Note: Cosgrove is added to the cast from "Don't Ask, Don't Tell" (ep. 9.4).)	Main
Gina Kincaid	Vanessa Marcil									Main (Note: Marcil is added to the cast from "You Say Goodbye, I Say Hello" (ep. 9.7). She departs in "Doc Martin" (ep. 10.17).)	Main

Cast notes

== Casting ==
Torand Productions was used by the production company for several seasons on the show. "Torand" is derived from the first several letters of Aaron Spelling's first and second children, Tori and Randy.

The original name for the show, used during shooting of the original pilot in March and April 1990, was Doing Time in Beverly Hills; later, the tentative title for the show changed to Class of Beverly Hills. The show's episodes were issue-based until the producers decided it should become a teen soap opera. In the first season, the teenage characters (aside from David Silver and Scott Scanlon) were said to be in the eleventh grade, but due to the success of the show, their ages were retconned to be one year younger in the second season, making them tenth graders in the first.

Jennie Garth had to audition five times for the role of Kelly Taylor and was the first to be cast on the show. Gabrielle Carteris felt that she was too old to play a high school student. She first auditioned for Brenda because she thought that being a real-life twin would help her chances, but the producers felt that she would be better for the part of Andrea. Alicia Silverstone was offered an unspecified role, but she turned it down to focus on a film career instead.

When Tori Spelling (Aaron Spelling's daughter) auditioned for the show, she used the name Tori Mitchell and auditioned for the role of Kelly Taylor, but she was eventually recognized and was instead cast as Donna Martin. Tori Spelling brought Shannen Doherty to her father's attention after seeing Doherty's movie Heathers and being impressed with her performance.

Lyman Ward was originally cast as Jim Walsh in the pilot but was replaced by James Eckhouse, and Ward's scenes were cut and re-shot with Eckhouse. Kristin Dattilo was also up for the role of Brenda Walsh, but she turned it down. She later guest-starred as Melissa Coolidge in an episode of the first season.

Additionally, Luke Perry had auditioned for the role of Steve Sanders, but the role eventually went to Ian Ziering before Perry was cast as Dylan McKay. Perry's character was not an original cast member of the show, and he was first featured in the show's second episode. He was originally intended to only appear in one story arc, for one or two episodes. Fox was initially reluctant to have him included as a regular, but Aaron Spelling felt differently and gave Perry a bigger role during the first two years until the network was won over.

In the first season, when Donna tries out for school D.J., she is referred to as Donna Morgan. Throughout the rest of the show, her name is Donna Martin.

In addition, in the first season Donna's mother was named Nancy Martin and played by actress Jordana Capra. When she was reintroduced in season two, she was named Felice Martin and was played by actress Katherine Cannon.

In the pilot episode, the role of Jackie Taylor was played by Pamela Galloway and by Ann Gillespie for the rest of the series. Terence Ford and Arthur Brooks portrayed Dylan's father, Jack McKay, in two episodes before Josh Taylor assumed the role.

=== Departures ===
The departure of Shannen Doherty at the end of season 4 came after a period of strife between Doherty, the other cast members, and the show's producers. Executive producer Charles Rosin commented in 2000 that Doherty "had habitual lateness, her lateness was appalling, and she had a callous attitude and an indifference." Trouble between Doherty and her co-stars, Jennie Garth in particular, was also widely reported in the media. Doherty, who was struggling in her personal life with her father's illness, came to an agreement with the producers to phase her out of the show at the beginning of season 4, when Brenda returns to Minnesota for college. It was planned to reduce her appearances from that point, but Doherty had a change of heart and requested to remain as a main cast member. However, as the fourth season wore on Doherty's attitude deteriorated and her friction with the other cast members intensified. When she caused continuity problems by cutting her hair halfway through filming an episode, the producers and cast requested from Aaron Spelling that she be fired.

In season 5, the production accommodated Gabrielle Carteris' pregnancy by reluctantly writing a pregnancy storyline for Andrea. The producers were unhappy with the more adult direction of the character, and Carteris was written off the show at the end of the season. Also in season 5, Jamie Walters was introduced as Donna's boyfriend Ray, who later begins abusing her. The writers intended to "rehabilitate" the character in season 6, and Walters signed a $1 million contract. However, the show received such a flood of negative mail from fans complaining about Donna being "stupid" for staying with her abuser, that an angry Aaron Spelling ordered that Walters should be fired. Producer Larry Mollin said of the incident that "he [Walters] got to walk away with his money. But it was still devastating for him. We left him as being a beater, which stayed with him, unfortunately. People thought he was a beater. It was just terrible." In Season 9 Jason Priestley left the show after starring in 4 episodes.

== Locations ==
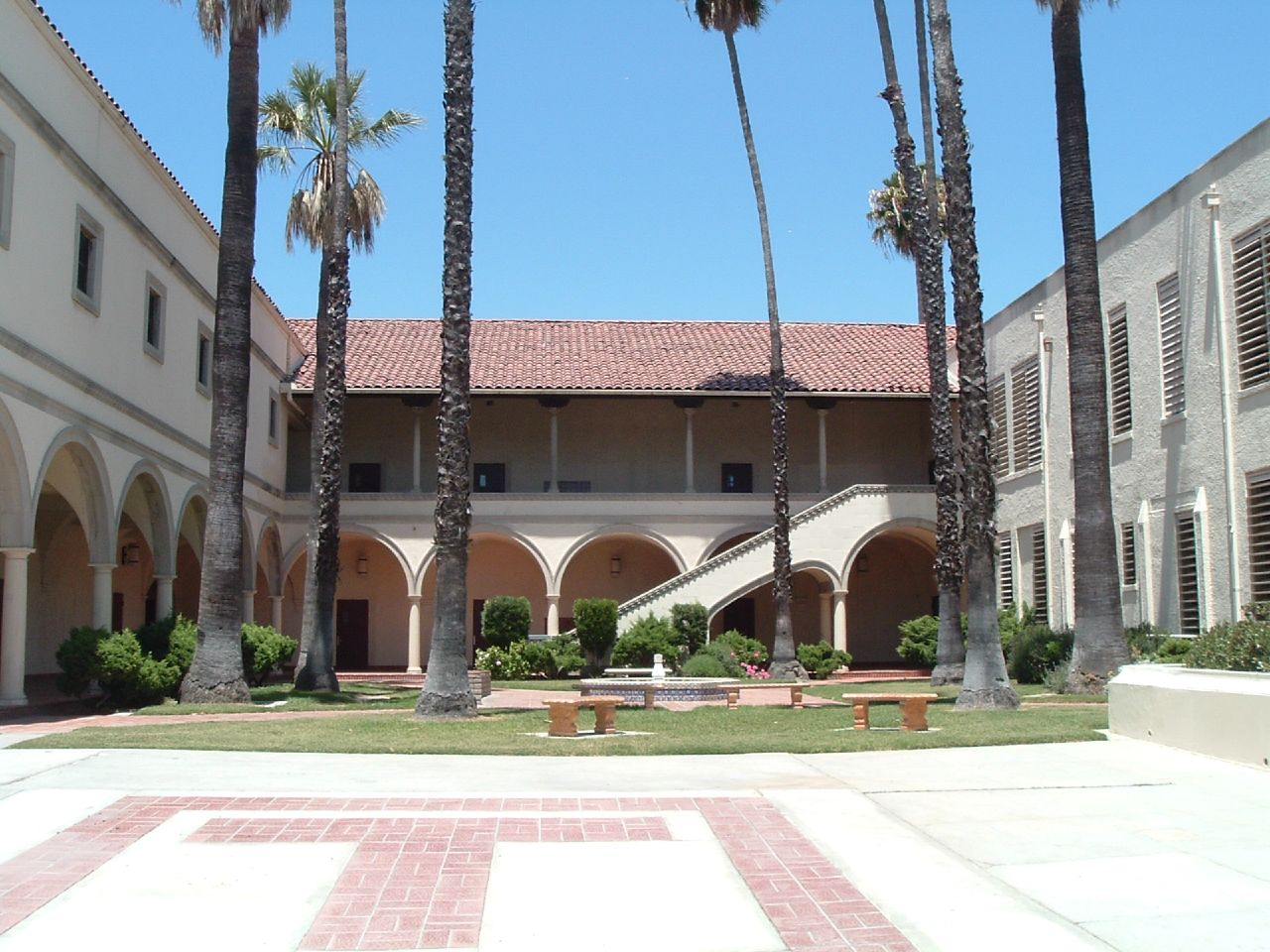
Torrance High School was used as a primary filming location for the fictional West Beverly High School's location.

The series was produced in Van Nuys, Los Angeles, California. During the 10 years the series was in production it was filmed in a warehouse complex in Van Nuys, the interiors of the series as well as the exteriors of the Peach Pit parking lot and P.P.A.D. club entrance were all located off the 15000 block of Calvert Street. An unmarked gated studio entrance now stands at this address, but the exterior brick facing of the P.P.A.D. is still visible down the alley, on the side of the building.

Locations in script

The studio building complex has since been the home to various projects including the 2006 CBS series Jericho, which guest starred James Eckhouse in one episode. Until February 2010, the CW series Melrose Place was also produced at the original 90210 Calvert studios. Post-production services for Beverly Hills, 90210 were provided by LaserPacific for all seasons.

Many changes were made after the pilot episode. The producers first used a location that was used only once during the pilot episode for the Walsh house, that was located in a gated community of Brentwood. After the pilot episode the Walsh house was moved to Altadena, California. The house used for Dylan's home in the show is located in the same Altadena neighborhood.

Three locations were used for the frontage of The Peach Pit during the show's ten-year history. The original location, on Pico Boulevard in Los Angeles, was used in only the first few episodes of season one and was changed to a different location for the rest of that season. When the Peach Pit was fictionally remodeled during season two, the producers used Rose City Diner in Pasadena, California, to film the exterior of the gang's hangout, and it remained the same throughout the rest of the show's run.

Most of the filming during the second season of the summer season at the Beverly Hills Beach Club took place in Santa Monica, at the old Sand and Sea Beach Club. The beach club used in the show was the very same beach club that was used during one summer season of Saved by the Bell.

The filming location for West Beverly High School was in the middle-class community of Torrance at Torrance High School, located in the 90501-zip code. Torrance High can also be seen in other shows such as Buffy the Vampire Slayer.

When the 90210 characters began attending the then-fictitious California University in the show's fourth season, the scenes around campus were actually filmed at Occidental College in Eagle Rock. Kelly and Donna's beach house used in the show is located in Hermosa Beach. The Golden Oak Ranch, outside Santa Clarita, was also used for filming.

== Broadcast ==
Beverly Hills, 90210 originally aired from October 4, 1990, to May 17, 2000, on Fox in the United States. The show aired Thursday at 9:00 pm for the first two seasons and Wednesday at 8:00 pm for the rest of its run. Reruns continued to air on Fox until September 30, 2000.

Prior to the premiere of Beverly Hills, 90210, Glory Days was airing on Thursdays at 9:00 pm. After the show had moved to Wednesday, where Fox did not have regular programming, The Heights took over the timeslot. After Beverly Hills, 90210 left Fox in 2000, it went to air reruns on syndication and was replaced by Malcolm in the Middle and Normal, Ohio.

Seasons 2 and 3 featured all new summer episodes that aired during July and August before the regular fall episodes started in September. At the beginning of the third season, in July and August 1992, all new summer episodes of Beverly Hills, 90210 were playing during the series new time slot of Wednesdays at 8pm but viewers could see repeats from Beverly Hills, 90210's first season in the original time slot of Thursdays at 9pm. The Fox Network was heavily promoting the new time slot so viewers could find the show. The seventh season started earlier than usual because of the 1996 Olympics and the MLB Playoffs on Fox during the month of October.

At various times since 1997, reruns of the show have aired in syndication, on the USA Network and FX. In 2005, SoapNet was airing reruns of the show seven days a week until the channel ceased operations in 2013. The syndicated episodes featured the show's original music, unlike the DVD and Hulu releases. Since 2014, Pop airs reruns of the show with two back-to-back episodes, sometimes three or four. The syndicated episodes that are featured on this network, however, do not use the show's original music with the content mostly taken from the DVD releases.

=== Specials ===
A number of specials were produced during and after the show's run.

No.	Title	Original release date
1	"90210: Behind the Zip Code"	September 18, 1992
A direct-to-video documentary released on VHS on September 18, 1992.
2	"Beverly Hills, 90210: Behind the Scenes"	May 26, 1993
A special that aired after the high school graduation episode.
3	"Beverly Hills, 90210: A Christmas Special"	December 19, 1994
A special in which fifth-season cast members discuss what their plans for their Christmas holiday would include.
4	"The Best Moments of Beverly Hills, 90210"	January 24, 1996
A 1996 retrospective of the first five and a half seasons hosted by Tori Spelling.
5	"Beverly Hills, 90210: Our Favorite Moments"	October 14, 1998
A 1998 retrospective of the first eight seasons hosted by Ian Ziering.
6	"Beverly Hills, 90210: The Final Goodbye"	May 10, 2000
A retrospective of the series and its finale.
7	"Beverly Hills, 90210: 10-Year High School Reunion"	May 11, 2003
Set in a mockup of the Walsh family living room, it featured all of the primary cast members that were on the show in May 1993 and was the first reunion of Shannen Doherty with her former castmates in nine years. This reunion is available on the 2013 Complete Box Set of Beverly Hills, 90210. with Shannen Doherty, Gabrielle Carteris, Jason Priestley, Ian Ziering, Luke Perry, Jennie Garth, Carol Potter, James Eckhouse and Joe E. Tata.
8	"Beverly Hills, 90210: Fox 25th Anniversary Special"	April 22, 2012
Retrospective of TV shows that aired on Fox. It ran for an hour and 35 minutes and there was a 3-minute 15 second segment on Beverly Hills, 90210 with interviews from Shannen Doherty, Gabrielle Carteris, Jason Priestley, and Ian Ziering.
9	"Beverly Hills, 90210: Behind Closed Doors"	May 17, 2020

== Reception ==
=== U.S. ratings ===
After poor ratings in the first season, the episodes' average ratings per season increased, constantly maintained above 11% from season two until season five, despite Shannen Doherty's departure at the end of season four. From season six until the end of the series the average rating gradually decreased, and the final blow to the show was the early ninth season's departures of Jason Priestley and Tiffani Thiessen (both season peaks at 8.1%). Since then no episode reached 8% again in ratings until the series finale, despite Luke Perry's return, with average ratings falling to 6.9% in season nine and 5.9% in the last season. During the entire series, the episodes with the highest ratings peaked at 14.1%, and included the closing episodes of seasons two and three, and the opening episode of season five.

Ratings table
Season	Time slot	Season premiere	Season finale	TV season	Rank	Viewers (in millions)	Ratings
1	Thursday 9:00 P.M. (October 4, 1990 – May 7, 1992)	October 4, 1990	May 9, 1991	1990–1991	#88	14.2	6.35
2	Thursday 9:00 P.M. (October 4, 1990 – May 7, 1992)	July 11, 1991	May 7, 1992	1991–1992	#48	17.6	11.73
3	Wednesday 8:00 P.M. (July 15, 1992 – May 17, 2000)	July 15, 1992	May 19, 1993	1992–1993	#42	18.3	11.14
4	Wednesday 8:00 P.M. (July 15, 1992 – May 17, 2000)	September 8, 1993	May 25, 1994	1993–1994	#41	21.7	11.40
5	Wednesday 8:00 P.M. (July 15, 1992 – May 17, 2000)	September 7, 1994	May 24, 1995	1994–1995	#46	14.7	11.21
6	Wednesday 8:00 P.M. (July 15, 1992 – May 17, 2000)	September 13, 1995	May 22, 1996	1995–1996	#53	14.5	9.83
7	Wednesday 8:00 P.M. (July 15, 1992 – May 17, 2000)	August 21, 1996	May 21, 1997	1996–1997	#61	13.2	8.35
8	Wednesday 8:00 P.M. (July 15, 1992 – May 17, 2000)	September 10, 1997	May 20, 1998	1997–1998	#59	11.4	8.35
9	Wednesday 8:00 P.M. (July 15, 1992 – May 17, 2000)	September 16, 1998	May 19, 1999	1998–1999	#75	9.7	6.83
10	Wednesday 8:00 P.M. (July 15, 1992 – May 17, 2000)	September 8, 1999	May 17, 2000	1999–2000	#82	8.33	5.88

Highest rated episode per season
Season	Peak episode	Rating (%)	Notes
1	Episode 22: "Home Again" Aired: May 9, 1991	9.2	Season finale
2	Episode 28: "Wedding Bell Blues" Aired: May 7, 1992	14.1	Season finale
3	Episodes 29 & 30: "Commencement (Part 1 & Part 2)" Aired: May 19, 1993	14.1	Season finale (two episodes aired together).
4	Episode 31 & 32: "Mr. Walsh Goes to Washington (Part 1 & Part 2)" Aired: May 25, 1994	13.9	Season finale (two episodes aired together); final episode of Shannen Doherty
5	Episode 1: "What I Did on My Summer Vacation & Other Stories" Aired: September 7, 1994	14.1	Season premiere; debut of Tiffani Thiessen.
6	Episode 10: "One Wedding and a Funeral" Aired: November 8, 1995	12.9	Final episode of Luke Perry until he returns in season 9.
7	Episode 21: "Straight Shooter" Aired: February 26, 1997	9.8	
8	Episodes 31 & 32: "The Wedding Part 1 & Part 2" Aired: May 20, 1998	10.0	Season finale (two episodes aired together).
9	Episode 5: "Brandon Leaves" Aired: November 4, 1998	8.1	Departure of Jason Priestley.
9	Episode 7: "You Say Goodbye, I Say Hello" Aired: November 18, 1998	8.1	Departure of Tiffani Thiessen and return of Luke Perry.
10	Episodes 26 & 27: "The Penultimate" and "Ode to Joy" Aired: May 17, 2000	9.6	Series finale (two episodes aired together).

Lowest rated episode per season
Season	Low episode	Rating (%)	Notes
1	Episode 7: "Perfect Mom" Aired: November 22, 1990	4.1	Lowest rated episode of the series
2	Episode 2: "The Party Fish" Aired: July 18, 1991	10.0	Lowest rated episode of season 2 but this episode achieved higher ratings than every episode in seasons 1, 7, 9, and 10.
3	Episodes 3: "Too Little, Too Late/Paris 75001" Aired: July 29, 1992	8.8	
4	Episode 4: "Greek to Me" Aired: September 29, 1993	9.8	
4	Episode 15: "Somewhere in the World It's Christmas" Aired: December 22, 1993	9.8	
5	Episode 29: "The Real McCoy" Aired: May 10, 1995	8.4	
6	Episode 29: "Ticket to Ride" Aired: May 8, 1996	8.4	
7	Episode 11: "If I Had a Hammer" Aired: November 27, 1996	6.0	
8	Episodes 28: "Skin Deep" Aired: April 29, 1998	6.8	
9	Episode 20: "Fortune Cookie" Aired: April 7, 1999	5.9	
9	Episode 23: "The End of the World as We Know It" Aired: April 28, 1999	5.9	
10	Episode 18: "Eddie Waitkus" Aired: March 1, 2000	4.6	

- Debut: Class of Beverly Hills/Pilot – 7.2 rating
- Series finale: 16.8 million viewers; 9.6 rating (8 pm – 10 pm)
- Specials:
  - Behind the Scenes (Season 3): 8.2 rating
  - Best Moments of 90210 (Season 6): 8.4 rating
  - Our Favorite Moments of 90210 (Season 9): 5.3 rating
  - Final Goodbye (Season 10): 6.8 rating
  - 10-Year High School Reunion (7 million viewers, 4.5 rating) (repeat on August 7, 2003: 3.3 million; 2.1 rating)

=== Series finale ===
Ratings for the tenth season declined to an average of 10 million viewers per episode (according to a May 2000 issue of Us Weekly). The ratings were low compared to previous seasons. The lower ratings, along with the high costs associated with any television show in its later seasons, led Fox to end the series in January 2000. Though there were many cast changes, over 25 million people tuned in to watch the final episode, which aired in May 2000. Tiffani Thiessen returned in the series finale.

== Impact ==
In 2008, Entertainment Weekly named the show #20 on its list of top 100 TV shows in the past 25 years. The magazine also named the theme music #15 on its list of top 25 TV themes in the past 25 years, and the "90210 Sideburns" #50 on its list of Pop Culture Moments that Rocked Fashion. The show was named one of the Best School Shows of All Time by AOL TV.

The first-season episode "Spring Dance" caused outrage from many parents after the character of Brenda loses her virginity to Dylan. Parents were offended by the fact that Brenda suffers no consequences and shows no remorse for having had sex, something unusual for network television in 1991. After a slew of angry phone calls to the network, Fox decided to placate upset viewers by featuring a pregnancy scare for Brenda and Dylan in the second season, as a means of "punishing" the teenagers for their decision. Executive Producer Charles Rosin criticized this decision, saying "Someday I will write a long article about the censorship that occurred after Brenda lost her virginity at the Spring Dance to her boyfriend (who had been AIDS tested) because she was happy and not full of remorse."

In February 1992, at the height of the show's popularity, the three main stars Jason Priestley, Shannen Doherty and Luke Perry were featured on the cover of Rolling Stone.

=== Parodies ===
The rap duo Insane Clown Posse released an EP titled Beverly Kills 50187 which featured a song titled "Beverly Kills" describing member Violent J killing the series' characters for being rich and prejudiced toward the "lower class".

The short-lived The Ben Stiller Show did a parody of this show, The Heights and Melrose Place called Melrose Heights 90210-2420 that portrayed the cast as superficial, self-absorbed, and self-pitying, as well as introducing each of the stereotypical cast along with "Akeem, the black guy". A typical episode's "issue" was a character getting a headache, which affected all the other characters. Each episode would end with the same upbeat song (resembling The Heights hit single "How Do You Talk to an Angel") performed by the whole cast with new lyrics for each episode.

When Jason Priestley guest-hosted Saturday Night Live in 1992, one of that episode's sketches, which parodied Beverly Hills 90210, involved that town's zip code being changed to 90218 due to the 1990 Census redistricting. Several of the characters take offense to the fact that Beverly Hills will be absorbed into poorer communities and convene at the Peach Pit, where a Hispanic busboy expresses pride that his native community of Reseda now shares the same zip code as the 90210 cast. The gang lashes out in different ways, with Dylan getting drunk and Donna and Kelly going impulse shopping. Priestley, in his role of Brandon, confiscates all their keys and puts them in a lockbox and gives them a tag to reclaim them when they regain self-control. The sketch ends with the zip code "Beverly Hills, 90210" retained as their rich and powerful parents lobbied the U.S. government not to redistrict.

The Fox sketch show The Edge did a parody of 90210 that mocked Tori Spelling. During the sketch, the character of Tori constantly says, "I can do whatever I want because this is my Daddy's show." Aaron Spelling took offense to this and asked for an apology from the producers of the show. Saturday Night Live also did a Tori Spelling parody as well, where Melanie Hutsell spoofed Spelling, which was met with less protest.

The Mickey Mouse Club did a parody sketch called Beverly Hillbillies 90210, combining the characters of both 90210 and The Beverly Hillbillies. In 1999, Christina Aguilera from the Mickey Mouse Club made a cameo performance on Beverly Hills 90210 as herself performing at the PPAD for David Silver's surprise birthday party, season 10 episode 2: "Let's Eat Cake". Music from former MMC members Justin Timberlake and JC Chasez of 'N Sync also was originally used during several opening title sequences during the mid-to-late seasons of 90210.

MADtv made its own parodies of the show as Beverly Hills, 90210 B.C. set in prehistoric Beverly Hills. When Luke Perry made his high-profile return to the series, MADtv did a second parody titled Beverly Hills 9021-H20 which had the characters being stalked and killed off by Luke Perry (Pat Kilbane), who had rejoined the cast as a masked killer who was a parody of Michael Myers of the Halloween film series.

The Czech TV Nova parody show Tele Tele made a parody of the show known as Heverly Debils. Three mini-episodes (about 10 minutes each) were filmed.

GZA of the Wu-Tang Clan released a song called "Killah Hills 10304", a reference to the show's title in a song about crime and a rough neighborhood.

A VH1 promo for I Love the 90s featured Hal Sparks and Michael Ian Black sitting in the Peach Pit, with Beverly Hills, 90210's theme music playing. Joe E. Tata also appears in the promo as Nat.

In 2009, The Simpsons aired an episode called "Waverly Hills, 9-0-2-1-D'oh", which features Lisa wanting to go to a better school and finding it in the very posh town of Waverly Hills.

=== In pop culture ===
In 2021, Beverly Hills, 90210 was one of the shows featured on season 1, episode 3 of Vice Media's Dark Side of the 90's entitled "TV for Teens."

== Soundtracks releases ==
Three soundtrack albums were released:

- Beverly Hills, 90210: The Soundtrack
- Beverly Hills 90210: The College Years
- Beverly Hills 90210: Songs from the Peach Pit.

== Home media ==
The following is a list of all home video releases for Beverly Hills, 90210:

=== VHS ===
VHS name	Ep #	Tape	Region 1 (USA)	VHS special features	Distributor
Beverly Hills 90210 Behind the Zip Code	0	1	September 18, 1992	None	Video Treasures
Beverly Hills 90210: Graduation	2	1	1993	Behind The Scenes	World Vision Home Video Inc.
Beverly Hills 90210: Pilot Movie	Film	1	1993	None	World Vision Home Video Inc.

=== DVD ===
CBS DVD (distributed by Paramount) has released all ten seasons on DVD in Regions 1, 2 & 4. Due to music licensing issues, most of the original music has been replaced on these DVD releases. Deleted songs include "Damn, I Wish I Was Your Lover", "Losing My Religion", and "In the Mood". Starting with Season 2, some episodes are edited from their original broadcast versions.

For reasons that were never made clear, the first three-season releases used promotional pictures from their succeeding seasons instead of the actual promotional pictures that were taken while the seasons aired. Due to the group pictures from the fourth season being used on the third season DVD and the absence of Shannen Doherty in later seasons, a collage of still photos was used on the fourth season. Jamie Walters was not featured on the covers of any of the seasons that he regularly appeared in (although he did appear in some of the DVD menu still shots for seasons 5 and 6). Kathleen Robertson was only featured on the cover of the seventh season, even though she had been a regular since season 6, recurring in the entirety of season 5 and made her first appearance towards the end of season 4 (her photo was, however, used in one of the inner cases for the season 6 release).

Hilary Swank, who was cast as a main star in the eighth season, is featured on the cover of the DVD, even though she left halfway through her only season on the show, while Vincent Young, who joined the cast that same year, is not on the cover at all, or on the cover of the ninth season (he is, however, featured on the tenth season cover), but Lindsay Price, Vanessa Marcil and Luke Perry were all featured on the cover, as were Jason Priestley and Tiffani-Amber Thiessen who both departed the series after a few episodes. Daniel Cosgrove was not featured on the Season 9 cover either even though he was a regular also (he is featured on the season 10 cover).

For seasons 1–8, the DVDs were packaged in individual slim plastic cases which were then housed in a large outer cardboard box. Beginning with season 9, the discs were fitted into a single standard-sized DVD case. Initial copies came with an outer cardboard slipcase.

The ninety-minute pilot episode was released separately on June 15, 2004.

On November 5, 2013, Paramount (CBS Home Entertainment) released Beverly Hills, 90210 – The Complete Series on DVD in Region 1, with extra bonuses not available on the season sets.

On May 18, 2021, Paramount (CBS Home Entertainment) released Beverly Hills, 90210 – The Ultimate Collection on DVD in Region 1, which includes the 2019 reboot BH90210 along with the season sets and bonus extras from the previous release.

Season	Episode count	Broadcast year	Region 1	Region 2	Region 4	# of discs
Pilot	Pilot	1990	June 15, 2004	N/A	N/A	1
1	22	1990–1991	November 7, 2006	November 15, 2006	November 1, 2006	6
2	28	1991–1992	May 1, 2007	July 27, 2007	May 3, 2007	8
3	29	1992–1993	December 11, 2007	March 24, 2008	December 6, 2007	8
4	31	1993–1994	April 29, 2008	September 1, 2008	June 5, 2008	8
5	31	1994–1995	July 29, 2008	February 9, 2009	October 2, 2008	8
6	32	1995–1996	November 25, 2008	May 21, 2009	April 2, 2009	7
7	31	1996–1997	April 7, 2009	September 14, 2009	October 1, 2009	7
8	31	1997–1998	November 24, 2009	March 22, 2010	May 6, 2010	7
9	26	1998–1999	February 2, 2010	June 21, 2010	July 1, 2010	6
10	27	1999–2000	November 2, 2010	August 30, 2010	September 16, 2010	6
The Complete Series	293	1990–2000	November 5, 2013	TBA	TBA	72

=== Remaster ===
On October 2, 2025, Paramount Global (via Paramount Home Entertainment) has announced that the entire series had already been remastered on 4K UHD months before with the series being fully re-released digitally on October 20 of the said year.

== Spin-offs and other media ==
=== Melrose Place ===
The series Melrose Place was a spin-off from the show, as actor Grant Show (who played Jake on Melrose Place) appeared for a multi-episode run at the end of the series second season as Kelly's love interest, and a friend of Dylan's. Jennie Garth, Tori Spelling, Brian Austin Green and Ian Ziering made appearances as their Beverly Hills, 90210 characters in the first few episodes of Melrose Place.

=== Models Inc ===
Models Inc., a series about the personal and professional struggles of several young models, spin-off from Melrose Place. The series was introduced via the characters Hillary Michaels, the mother of Melrose Place's Amanda Woodward, and model Sarah Owens—both of whom had appeared in a multi-episode run on MP. In addition to his role in Melrose Place, Jake Hanson was the only character to appear in both Beverly Hills, 90210 and Models Inc.

=== 90210 ===
A third spin-off premiered on The CW Network on September 2, 2008, focusing on a family from Kansas who move to Beverly Hills when the children's grandmother has an alcohol addiction.

In guest appearances, Jennie Garth, Shannen Doherty and Tori Spelling reprised their roles as Kelly Taylor, Brenda Walsh and Donna Martin, respectively. Joe E. Tata also reprised his role as Nat, owner of the Peach Pit, diner turned coffee house, for a couple of episodes at the beginning of the show's first season.Ann Gillespie also reprised her role as Jackie Taylor, Kelly's mom, in the first 2 seasons. Jackie dies of cancer early in season 2.

The series was canceled by The CW on February 28, 2013, after five seasons.

=== Melrose Place (2009) ===
A fifth series was officially picked up by The CW on May 21, 2009. The show is an updated version of Melrose Place, featuring a group of young adults living in a West Hollywood apartment complex. Smallville producers Todd Slavkin and Darren Swimmer wrote the pilot script and became the executive producers on the series. The series was canceled on May 20, 2010.

=== Novelizations ===
Several books based on the scripts were written by Mel Gilden.

=== Unauthorized Story ===
On October 3, 2015, a television movie called The Unauthorized Beverly Hills, 90210 Story was aired on the Lifetime network. The film purports to dramatize the behind-the-scenes making of the series.

== Reboot ==
In December 2018 it was reported on Deadline Hollywood that a reboot of Beverly Hills, 90210 was being shopped around to different networks. The project was initially developed by Tori Spelling and Jennie Garth in conjunction with CBS Television Studios, and was first hinted at by Spelling on her Instagram page the previous March. The bulk of the original cast is attached, including Garth, Spelling, Shannen Doherty, Jason Priestley, Ian Ziering, Brian Austin Green and Gabrielle Carteris. CBS confirmed on December 18 that the project was in "early development", adding "We aren't confirming much detail except that it is an untraditional take on a reboot with some of the original cast".

On February 1, 2019, Spelling confirmed that a reboot of the show was underway, stating,

It is the OG crew back together, and we're playing heightened versions of ourselves. The fans will be pleasantly surprised, though, because we will intercut that with scenes from the show. So it'll be a whole ensemble cast.

She added that "almost everybody" from the original cast was set to return, with Luke Perry's participation initially presumed to be limited because of his work on Riverdale until his death on March 4.

Following Perry's death, CBS Television executive David Stapf said the new series would honor him in some way. Stapf also confirmed Spelling pitched the idea of a new TV show reuniting the original cast.

On February 27, 2019, it was announced that a six-episode reboot had been ordered by Fox. According to a press release on April 26, 2019, the revival — retitled as BH90210 — would feature the cast playing "heightened versions of themselves" in an irreverent drama "inspired by their real lives and relationships with each other." On May 8, 2019, it was announced that the reboot would premiere on August 7, 2019, at 9/8c on Fox. It was announced on November 7, 2019, that there would not be a season 2 of the reboot.

== Awards and nominations ==
Awards and nominations for Beverly Hills, 90210
Year	Award	Result	Category	Recipient
1991	Young Artist Awards	Nominated	Best New Family Television Comedy Series	–
1991	Young Artist Awards	Won	Best Young Actor Supporting or Re-Occurring Role for a TV Series	Douglas Emerson
1991	Young Artist Awards	Nominated	Best Young Actor Supporting or Re-Occurring Role for a TV Series	Brian Austin Green
1991	Young Artist Awards	Nominated	Best Young Actress Supporting or Re-Occurring Role for a TV Series	Jennie Garth
1991	Young Artist Awards	Nominated	Best Young Actress Starring in a New Television Series	Shannen Doherty
1992	Young Artist Awards	Won	Outstanding Young Ensemble Cast in a Television Series	–
1992	Young Artist Awards	Nominated	Best Young Actress Starring in a Television Series	Shannen Doherty
1992	Young Artist Awards	Won	Best Young Actor Co-starring in a Television Series	Brian Austin Green
1992	Young Artist Awards	Won	Best Young Actress Co-starring in a Television Series	Jennie Garth
1992	Young Artist Awards	Nominated	Best Young Actress Co-starring in a Television Series	Tori Spelling
1993	Young Artist Awards	Won	Favorite Young Ensemble Cast in a Television Series	Jason Priestley, Shannen Doherty, Jennie Garth, Ian Ziering, Gabrielle Carteris, Luke Perry, Brian Austin Green, Tori Spelling
1993	Young Artist Awards	Nominated	Best Young Actor Recurring in a Television Series	Cory Tyler
1993	Young Artist Awards	Won	Best Young Actress Recurring in a Television Series	Dana Barron
1994	Young Artist Awards	Nominated	Best Youth Actress Guest Starring in a Television Show	Sabrina Wiener
1998	Young Artist Awards	Nominated	Best Performance in a TV Drama Series – Guest Starring Young Actress	Danielle Keaton
1992	Golden Globe Award	Nominated	Best TV-Series – Drama	–
1993	Golden Globe Award	Nominated	Best TV-Series – Drama	–
1993	Golden Globe Award	Nominated	Best Performance by an Actor in a TV-Series – Drama	Jason Priestley
1995	Golden Globe Award	Nominated	Best Performance by an Actor in a TV-Series – Drama	Jason Priestley
1992	TP de Oro	Won	Best Foreign Series	–
1993	TP de Oro	Won	Best Foreign Series	–
1995	ASCAP Film and Television Music Awards	Won	Top TV Series	–
1995	Emmy Award	Nominated	Outstanding Guest Actor in a Drama Series	Milton Berle
1996	BMI Film & TV Awards	Won	BMI TV Music Award	–
1999	Teen Choice Awards	Nominated	TV – Choice Actress	Jennie Garth
2004	TV Land Awards	Nominated	Favorite Greasy Spoon	–
2004	TV Land Awards	Nominated	Favorite Teen Dream – Male	Luke Perry
2006	TV Land Awards	Nominated	Most Happening Greasy Spoon or Hangout	–
2007	TV Land Awards	Nominated	Break Up That Was So Bad It Was Good	Luke Perry and Shannen Doherty
2019	Teen Choice Awards	Nominated	Choice Throwback TV Show	Beverly Hills, 90210
