= Charles Rosin =

American screenwriter and producer (born 1952)

- Born: January 4, 1952 (age 74); Los Angeles, California, U.S.
- Occupations: Screenwriter, television producer
- Spouse: Karen Green
- Children: 3
- Writing career
- Notable works: Beverly Hills, 90210, Northern Exposure

Charles Scott Rosin (born January 4, 1952) is an American screenwriter and producer who has written for television since the late 1970s.

== Career ==
Rosin is best known for his work as writer/executive producer on the television series Beverly Hills, 90210 throughout the first 144 episodes/five seasons of the show, from 1990–1995. During Rosin's tenure as executive producer the series received a People's Choice Award, two Golden Globe Nominations, and numerous citations and awards for its sensitive handling of contemporary issues.

Other writing credits include Dawson's Creek, Leap Years and Northern Exposure. Rosin's work on Northern Exposure earned him an Emmy nomination in 1990.

== Current project ==
In 2008, Rosin created the web series and website Showbizzle.com along with his daughter, Lindsey Rosin. According to the show's website Showbizzle is "a new form of internet entertainment that combines daily updates of original, scripted video content with a social network aimed at emerging actors, writers, directors, fans of the biz – basically anyone with a computer who is looking for some fun entertainment."

== Personal life ==
Rosin was born and raised in Los Angeles, California, graduated from Beverly Hills High School in 1970, and the University of California at Berkeley. He is married to his wife of many years, Karen Rosin (née Green), and they have three children: Lindsey, Maxine and Avery.
