= Vincent Young (actor) =

American actor (born 1965)

- Born: Vincent D. Young; June 4, 1965 (age 60); Philadelphia, Pennsylvania, U.S.
- Years active: 1995–present

Vincent D. Young (born June 4, 1965) is an American actor best known for playing Noah Hunter on the TV series Beverly Hills, 90210.

== Life and career ==
Young was born in Philadelphia, Pennsylvania and during his high school years, he competed in wrestling and football. During the mid-1990s he lived in Paris and later returned to United States and attended William Esper Studio in Manhattan, when he landed his first screen role in the romantic comedy film, A Modern Affair. In 1997, he landed his best-known role of Noah Hunter on the Fox prime time soap opera, Beverly Hills, 90210. He was on the show from 1997 to 2000.

Young has also made guest appearances on CSI: NY, NCIS, and JAG.

== Filmography ==
=== Film ===
Year	Title	Role	Notes
1995	A Modern Affair	Tony	
2004	Knuckle Sandwich	Raoul	
2009	Adult Film: A Hollywood Tale	Bud Lunger	
2010	Eagles in the Chicken Coop	Bud Lunger	
2018	What Death Leaves Behind	Andrew Blosser	
2018	Escape Plan 2: Hades	Curly	
2019	The 5th Boro	Finn	
2020	3 Days Rising	Rich Usher	

=== Television ===
Year	Title	Role	Notes
1996	Pacific Blue	Sam	Episode: "Outlaw Extreme"
1997–2000	Beverly Hills, 90210	Noah Hunter	Main role
2004	JAG	Vince Dolan	Episode: "There Goes the Neighborhood"
2006	CSI: NY	Stewart DeCaro	Episode: "Necrophilia Americana"
2006	NCIS	Mikel Mawher	Episode: "Bloodbath"
