= Melrose Place season 5 =

Melrose Place
- Season 5
- Starring: Josie Bissett Thomas Calabro David Charvet Marcia Cross Rob Estes Brooke Langton Laura Leighton Lisa Rinna Kelly Rutherford Doug Savant Grant Show Andrew Shue Courtney Thorne-Smith Jack Wagner Special guest star: Heather Locklear as Amanda
- No. of episodes: 34

Release
- Original network: Fox
- Original release: September 9, 1996 – May 19, 1997

Season chronology
- ← Previous; Season 4 Next → Season 6

The fifth season of Melrose Place, an American television series, premiered on Fox on September 9, 1996. The season five finale aired on May 19, 1997, after 34 episodes.

The season was produced by Chip Hayes, supervising producer Dee Johnson, co-executive producers Carol Mendelsohn and Charles Pratt, Jr., and executive producers Aaron Spelling, E. Duke Vincent and Frank South.

The season was released on DVD as two-volume box sets under the title of Melrose Place - The Fifth Season: Volumes One and Two. The first volume being released on February 10, 2009 and the latter volume being released on November 24, 2009 by Paramount Home Video.

== Storylines ==
A detective tells Amanda (now married to Peter, who's incarcerated for Bobby's murder) that Peter is not who he claims to be. Jane and Sydney are concerned that the truth will emerge about what happened to Richard, who harasses and threatens the sisters (who do not know that he is alive). Jake and Alison begin an affair behind Billy's back. Kimberly couldn't remember her dinner with Peter, and his trial was only a few days away. Two characters are introduced: Taylor McBride (Lisa Rinna) and her husband Kyle (Rob Estes), a Boston restaurateur. Learning of Peter's arrest, Taylor goes to Los Angeles for answers, rents Jo's vacant apartment and persuades Kyle to move their restaurant to L.A. She seems to have a secret involving Peter, and clashes with Amanda.

Richard stalks Jane and Sydney. Artist Samantha Reilly (Brooke Langton)—Jane's new roommate—suspects that something is wrong. He is killed by a police officer when he tries to shoot the sisters at a rural convenience store, and the police let them keep the money he stole from Jane.

Kimberly begins to remember the dinner, and the waiter who waited on her and Peter is found. Peter is released as Taylor grows closer to him. Drinking heavily, he spends time at Kyle's restaurant. Alison declines Billy's proposal; she and Jake grow closer, and Billy's jealousy increases. When Jane learns about Jake and Alison's relationship she throws a brick through their bedroom window, slashes Alison's tires and obtains a restraining order against Jake. Taylor tells Peter that she is Taylor Davis, younger sister of his late wife Beth. Amanda begins to lose Peter as his interest in Taylor increases.

Another new character, Megan Lewis (Kelly Rutherford), meets Michael when he runs on the beach. They begin an affair, since Kimberly has been ordered by her psychiatrist not to have sex. When he learns that Megan is a prostitute, Michael wants to be the only man in her life.

Amanda meets a co-worker, Craig Field (David Charvet), whose father (Michael Des Barres) is her boss. Craig learns that he inherited the company from his mother, and harasses Amanda. His father dies of a heart attack after Amanda learns that he was involved in Craig's grandfather's murder.

Michael finds Megan and Kimberly talking, and learns that Kimberly hired Megan to sleep with him. Michael makes Megan give up prostitution (assuring her that he will pay her living expenses), and Kimberly learns that she has a brain tumor and three months to live.

Jane discovers that she was adopted and meets her mother, Sherry (Donna Mills). After she is robbed, Jane leaves her apartment and business to Sydney and visits her family in Chicago.

Alison learns that she is pregnant with Jake's baby. Ambivalent about the pregnancy, she returns to D & D and has a miscarriage which leaves her infertile. Despite this, they marry.

Matt's drug use becomes known and he enters rehab, beginning a relationship with director Dan Hathaway (Greg Evigan). Dan is domineering and physically abusive, and Matt leaves him after Peter threatens to have Dan fired if he does not address his behavioral problems.

Taylor and Kyle's marriage is troubled, and Kyle has a one-night stand with Sydney. Sydney is in a relationship with millionaire Carter Gallavan (Chad Lowe), which ends when he learns about her attraction to Kyle. A con artist fakes an accident at Sydney's store and, left penniless after a trial, she becomes a con artist herself.

Michael and Kimberly divorce as she coaxes him towards Megan. After Kimberly tells Megan she is planning suicide, she and Michael are injured in a car accident. Although Michael has a dream where Megan pulls him into heaven as Kimberly pulls him into hell, he promises Kimberly he will spend his last days with her and they reconcile.

Billy and Samantha begin a relationship after her fling with Craig. After they move in together, her abusive father (who has escaped from prison) appears, demands money from them and takes off; the police tap their phone.

Jake reconciles with his son and ex-girlfriend after her husband leaves them, and Alison (who sees that he needs a family) pretends to start drinking again so he can leave her. Alison leaves for Atlanta, and Jake sells Shooters and moves to Ojai to join his former girlfriend and their son.

Peter and Taylor begin an affair, and Kyle and Amanda both file for divorce. Peter begins making Taylor look and act like his late wife, which she detests. Michael and Megan marry; this is his fourth marriage.

He and Taylor drug Peter, convincing him that he has epilepsy. Michael cheats Peter out of the chief-of-staff position by tricking him into signing a contract. When Peter learns the truth he throws Michael through a window, cutting the surgeon's hands, and tries to push Taylor off a lighthouse in the season finale when she tells him she is pregnant.

Sydney plots against Amanda, falling down a spiral staircase during a party at D & D and faking injury. Although Craig pretends to be concerned about Sydney to save D & D from a lawsuit, a genuine relationship develops.

Kimberly's brain tumor in remission, she tries to break up Michael and Megan before dying in her mother's arms from a ruptured aneurysm. Amanda loses control of D & D after Craig and Sydney launch a new advertising agency, and Sydney accepts Craig's proposal.

Michael's troublemaking younger sister, Jennifer (Alyssa Milano), appears. The woman with whom Kyle had an affair in Boston, she tries to break up his marriage to Taylor and (later) his romance with Amanda.

Matt's teenaged niece, Chelsea (Katie Wright), moves in with him after her father's death. Her estranged mother, Denise (Nancy Lee Grahn), initially wins a custody battle with him for his niece, who decides to stay with Matt anyway.

In the season finale, Sydney and Craig marry; Kyle leaves in the middle of the wedding to find Amanda, who plans to move to New York, and they reconcile. Working as a grocery-store cashier, Samantha is taken hostage by her father and in a high-speed police chase. As Craig and Sydney stand outside the church Samantha and her father (with the police in pursuit) plow into the wedding party, crash through a bus stop next to the church and run Sydney down. The episode ends with Craig sobbing over Sydney's body.

== Cast ==
=== Main cast members ===
In alphabetical order

- Josie Bissett as Jane Mancini (episodes 1–15)
- Thomas Calabro as Michael Mancini
- David Charvet as Craig Field (episodes 28–34; recurring episodes 5–27)
- Marcia Cross as Kimberly Shaw (episodes 1–27)
- Rob Estes as Kyle McBride
- Brooke Langton as Samantha Reilly
- Laura Leighton as Sydney Andrews
- Lisa Rinna as Taylor McBride
- Kelly Rutherford as Megan Lewis (episodes 16–34; recurring episodes 5–15)
- Doug Savant as Matt Fielding
- Grant Show as Jake Hanson
- Andrew Shue as Billy Campbell
- Courtney Thorne-Smith as Alison Parker
- Jack Wagner as Peter Burns

=== Special guest star ===
- Heather Locklear as Amanda Woodward

=== Recurring guest stars ===
- Patrick Muldoon as Richard Hart
- Greg Evigan as Dr. Dan Hathaway
- Katie Wright as Chelsea Fielding
- Michael Des Barres as Arthur Field
- Chad Lowe as Carter Gallavan
- Anthony Denison as Jim Reilly
- Alyssa Milano as Jennifer Mancini
- Nancy Lee Grahn as Denise Fielding
- Phil Morris as Walter
- Scott Plank as Nick Reardon
- Stacy Haiduk as Colleen Patterson
- Donna Mills as Sherry Doucette
- Markus Flanagan as Harry Dean
- Damian Chapa as Josh Laughlin
- Edie McClurg as Hilda Morris

== Episodes ==
No. overall	No. in season	Title	Directed by	Written by	Original release date	Prod. code	U.S. viewers (millions)
131	1	"Living With Disaster"	Frank South	Frank South	September 9, 1996	2396126	11.9
Detective Wylie tells Amanda that Peter is really Peter Howell, a man wanted for his wife’s murder in Kansas City. Amanda travels to Kansas City and learns that Peter’s ex-wife Beth had terminal cancer. Beth’s mother says that while Peter was originally charged with a mercy killing, Beth’s recently-uncovered diary reveals that she killed herself because Peter couldn't do it. However, when Amanda visits Peter in jail, he confesses to killing Beth. Kimberly wakes from her coma but disappears from the hospital before making a statement to police. In Boston, Taylor McBride sees Peter in the newspaper and travels to Los Angeles, where she unsuccessfully tries to visit Peter in jail and makes plans to rent Jo’s apartment. Jane and Billy visit Richard’s house, where she is spooked by muddy footprints in the hallway. As Samantha moves into Jane’s apartment, Jane and Sydney find a shovel outside and Samantha later finds the trenchcoat Jane wore while burying Richard. Jane’s fears are allayed after the LAPD concludes that Richard ran off, but she is later terrified to find a load of dirt in her bed, as Richard smirks outside. Alison apologizes to Billy and agrees to another date, where she walks out on another marriage proposal. Later, Jake and Alison decide to lay low until they tell Billy about their relationship. Brooke Langton is made a series regular as Samantha Reilly. First appearances of Rob Estes as Kyle McBride and Lisa Rinna as Taylor McBride.
132	2	"Over Dick's Dead Body"	Chip Chalmers	Charles Pratt, Jr.	September 16, 1996	2396127	10.8
Peter tells Amanda why he killed Beth, and Kimberly tells Amanda she can't remember her dinner with Peter. After Peter is injured attacking a sheriff’s officer in frustration, he tells Amanda that he'll kill someone if he's not released from jail. Kyle surprises Taylor in Los Angeles and agrees to both expand their Boston restaurant to Los Angeles and rent an apartment at Melrose Place. After Jane tells Sydney about the dirt in her bed, they visit Richard’s burial site and find a note demanding $50,000 in exchange for silence about the murder. While dropping off $50,000 in counterfeit money, Jane and Sydney instead find Samantha and realize they've been set up. However, the next night, Richard ships a mannequin wearing his bloody clothes to the boutique, demanding $50,000 be left at the burial site. When Jane and Sydney drop off the money, Richard reveals himself to the sisters and forces them to dig their own graves at gunpoint. After hotel hookups and thwarted visits, Alison decides to move out of Melrose Place to continue her secret relationship with Jake, raising the suspicions of Billy. Matt grows paranoid as his amphetamine addiction begins to affect his studies. Later, he steals prescription blanks from Michael’s office to obtain more drugs.
133	3	"Moving Violations"	Richard Lang	Carol Mendelsohn	September 23, 1996	2396128	11.0
During her testimony, Kimberly confesses that she doesn't remember the dinner. Peter later testifies on his own behalf, which resurfaces Kimberly’s memory of a second waiter, who is located and corroborates Peter’s alibi. Peter is released from jail but expresses his depression to Amanda, who reminds him of her love. Both Kyle and Amanda become suspicious of Taylor’s attendance at Peter’s court hearing. Jane and Sydney escape from Richard and encounter a National Park Service police officer, who drives them back to their car, where the tires have been slashed and the money has been taken. After the police spot his car at a convenience store, Richard is killed in a shootout. Jane and Sydney get their money back from a suspicious police officer. Later, Jane dissuades Samantha from moving out and apologizes to Jake and Alison for pushing them away, while Sydney loans money to Jane. Alison and Jake are frustrated by Billy’s help during her move. During Billy’s surprise farewell party for Alison, Billy meets Samantha and Alison writes a note to Jake telling him to meet at her apartment. When Billy misinterprets the note as meant for him, he arrives at Alison’s apartment seconds before Jake, and he punches Jake when he realizes the situation. Michael confronts Matt over the forged prescription and is later asked by Matt’s professor to investigate his drug use. Meanwhile, Matt’s friends and Alison grow suspicious of Matt’s behavior.
134	4	"Hunka Hunka Burnin' Love"	Charles Correll	Dee Johnson	September 30, 1996	2396129	11.0
Peter and Amanda quarrel about moving in together until Peter finds out that Sydney sold his house and car while he was incarcerated. Peter fires Sydney, but she gets hired by Jane. Later, Peter and Amanda take an impromptu honeymoon. Taylor schedules a doctor’s appointment to meet Peter and apologizes to Amanda for attending Peter’s court hearing, while also divulging that Kyle had an affair in Boston. Billy rejects Alison’s apology. Later, he cuts short a date with Samantha after being unable to stop thinking about Alison. Jane becomes suspicious after finding Jake’s shirt in Alison’s apartment. At the grand opening of Jane’s boutique, Billy drunkenly exposes Alison and Jake’s affair, and Jane kicks them out. Later, Jane confronts Alison at her apartment and trips on a wire while leaving, starting a fire. Michael tells Matt to get his act straight, but Matt is later admitted to the hospital after taking PCP from a friend. Michael agrees to conceal Matt’s lab reports, and Matt is later arrested after impulsively soliciting a hustler who turned out to be an undercover cop. Kimberly tells Michael she's too stressed for sex. When her medical license is suspended, she opts to forfeit the license altogether and gets hired as Sydney’s replacement.
135	5	"Un-Janed Melody"	Jefferson Kibbee	James Kahn	October 28, 1996	2396130	12.0
Jane saves Alison and Jake from the fire, but Sydney and Alison both question Jane’s role. Jane pretends to reconcile with Alison and Jake and later fails to convince Billy to help break them up. On her own, Jane throws a brick through Jake’s window and frames Billy, leading Jake to threaten Billy. Billy and Sam connect on another date. Sydney offers some of Sam’s paintings to Kyle, and things get flirtatious in the kitchen. After overhearing Peter and Amanda’s honeymoon plans, Taylor convinces Kyle to vacation at the same place. Amanda becomes increasingly suspicious as Taylor and Kyle spend time with Peter. Meanwhile, at D&D, Billy meets Craig, new employee and son of board chairman Arthur Field. While Billy tells Arthur that Amanda is with a client, Craig snoops around and finds a note from Amanda telling Billy that she's on her honeymoon. Arthur calls Amanda and demands that she return to D&D and fire Billy for lying, but she agrees to demote Billy and transfer his accounts to Craig. Billy overhears Craig and Arthur discussing plans to oust Amanda, but he refuses to tell Amanda after the demotion. Michael is turned off by Kimberly’s non-sexual touching techniques, but his fortunes turn when he meets fellow jogger Megan. Matt checks into rehab, where head doctor Dan Hathaway tries to break through to him. First appearances of David Charvet as Craig Field and Kelly Rutherford as Megan Lewis. Initially recurring, they would both be promoted later in the season.
136	6	"Jane's Addiction"	Chip Chalmers	Kathryn Baker	November 4, 1996	2396131	12.5
Arthur asks Amanda to let Craig attend pitch meetings and instructs Craig to set up Amanda with a youthful pitch to a bottled water company. Amanda agrees to give Billy his position back if he shares his information on Craig, leading Amanda to steal Craig’s pitch. Afterwards, Craig tells Arthur he can bring down Amanda on his own. Elsewhere, Amanda and Peter continue to clash over his relationship with the McBrides and laziness. When Amanda cancels dinner with Peter for a pitch meeting, he ends up drunk at Kyle’s. Kyle buys Sam’s painting from Sydney believing that Sam is a male Russian immigrant. When Jane slashes Alison’s tires and feigns disbelief, Billy tells Alison that Jane is the culprit. After Jake finds Jane stalking him and Alison, Jane files a restraining order against Jake. Despite Jane’s efforts to dissuade her, Sam continues to date Billy and they kiss. After some hesitation, Michael begins an affair with Megan. Matt checks out of rehab early only to find he's been suspended from his residency. Dan agrees to help Matt get his suspension lifted, and they admit to liking each other.
137	7	"Young Doctors in Heat"	Anson Williams	Edward Gold	November 11, 1996	2396132	13.0
Peter moves in with Michael and Kimberly to defuse his feud with Amanda. When Amanda and Craig get sent to San Francisco for a pitch, Peter spends his time drinking at Kyle’s, and when he spends a night sleeping on the McBrides’ couch, Taylor kisses him. Upon her return, Amanda rents out Kyle’s for a private dinner with Peter and they reconcile. Later, as Peter leaves the hospital, Taylor reveals herself as Beth’s younger sister. Michael continues to sleep with Megan, but she rebuffs his efforts to learn more about her life. Believing her health problems to be physical, Kimberly sees a doctor who discovers cranial pressure above her eye and orders an MRI, which produces abnormal results. Alison and Jake continue to feud over how to handle Jane as she continues her harassment. Sam walks out on a date with Billy after noticing his enjoyment of Alison and Jake’s feud. In an attempt to get over her fantasies about Kyle, Sydney accepts a blind date with Sam’s rich friend, but things turn south when the date emerges naked from Sydney’s bathroom. Afterwards, Sydney swears off dating and helps Kyle at the restaurant after Taylor disappears. Matt ends his medical relationship with Dan so they can begin a romantic relationship.
138	8	"Mission: Interpersonal"	Charles Correll	Charles Pratt, Jr.	November 11, 1996	2396133	13.0
Taylor tells Peter to keep their family relationship a secret. While Amanda is on a business trip, Peter and Taylor spend time together and Peter buys Amanda an engagement ring. Sydney sees Peter showing Taylor the ring. When Peter gives Amanda the ring upon her return, she tells him to return it for financial reasons. Kyle tells Sydney that Taylor’s been weird and admits to an affair in Boston. Michael persists at uncovering information about Megan and finds out she is a sex worker. Kimberly learns that she has an inoperable brain tumor with three months to live but doesn't tell Michael. When Kimberly tells Michael she's ready for sex, he evades her. After Michael leaves Megan’s house, Kimberly tells Megan that they need to talk and Megan confirms that he doesn't know about their arrangement. Jake invites Jane to dinner, where she breaks down when Jake says he loves Alison. Later, Jane drops the stalking charges against Jake, saying that she was just taking out her hatred of Richard on him. Sam and Billy agree to be friends, while Craig takes Sam on a date. Matt and Dan grow closer.
139	9	"Farewell, Mike's Concubine"	Jefferson Kibbee	Carol Mendelsohn	November 18, 1996	2396134	13.1
Craig agrees to give Amanda the minutes from a D&D meeting in exchange for not telling Arthur about his disastrous pitch. Later, Craig learns he owns a controlling interest in D&D. Sydney tells Amanda that she saw Peter show Taylor the engagement ring. Peter tells Amanda that nothing is going on and they later apologize to each other. Kyle questions Taylor’s involvement with Peter, and Taylor asks Peter not to disclose their familial relationship. Peter throws his hat in the ring for chief of staff instead of recommending Michael. Craig walks out on Sam after she refuses to sleep with him. Kimberly terminates her agreement whereby she paid Megan to sleep with Michael, but Michael keeps spending time with Megan against her wishes. Later, Megan agrees to be Michael’s mistress, and Kimberly tells Megan she can date Michael if she promises to be there for him after Kimberly dies. When Alison takes a temporary consulting gig at D&D, Jake offers Alison a partnership in Shooters. Jane promises to keep her distance from Jake and makes plans to visit her parents in Chicago to find herself. Dan hesitates to begin a relationship with Matt.
140	10	"Nice Work If You Can Get It"	Charles Correll	Dee Johnson	November 25, 1996	2396135	12.4
Peter tells Amanda he's in the running for chief of staff, but his confidence plummets after the first surgical patient since his incarceration dies and he suffers a panic attack in the OR. Kyle walks out on Taylor after repeatedly observing her spend time with Peter. At D&D, Craig assumes control of day-to-day operations and moves into Amanda’s office, while Arthur enlists Amanda to rein in Craig. Craig and Sam reconcile and she gifts him a painting for his office. Elsewhere, Kyle kisses Sydney after she delivers another painting from Sam. Kimberly walks in on Michael and Megan spending time together and later tells Michael she doesn't love him. Despite Megan telling Kimberly that their plan cannot continue, Kimberly asks Michael for a divorce. In Chicago, Jane learns that she was adopted after attempting to donate blood for her mother’s surgery. Later, she takes steps to learn her biological mother’s name. Matt and Dan begin a relationship and argue over where to spend the night after a hospital event. Alison declines a 50% interest in Shooters.
141	11	"Sole Sister"	Chip Hayes	Chip Hayes	December 2, 1996	2396136	12.5
Amanda learns from Craig that Arthur has a dark secret. Peter opens up to Amanda about his panic attack, but they later argue over his golfing and her dinner with Craig. Kyle tells Sydney that their night together was a one-off occurrence and warns Peter to not get physical with Taylor. Sam rejects another date with Billy, and Craig rents a loft for Sam to use as an art studio. Jane returns to Los Angeles to find her birth mother and begins to push Sydney away. Later, Jane learns that her mother was an actress named Sherry Doucette. After some more disagreement with Jake, Alison accepts a partnership in Shooters. Michael tells Megan that he loves her. Kimberly serves Michael with divorce papers, and Megan promises Kimberly that she'll take care of Michael after she dies. A former flame confronts Dan at a restaurant and warns Matt about his future with Dan.
142	12	"Quest for Mother"	Charles Correll	James Kahn	December 9, 1996	2396137	12.1
Craig threatens to go to the police with Arthur’s secret, leading Arthur to tell Amanda that she no longer needs to snoop on Craig. Amanda and Peter argue after he doesn't get the chief of staff job and loses $1,200 in a golf bet to Kyle, although Taylor convinces Kyle to return the money. Taylor takes time off from the restaurant, leading to Sydney’s hiring as a part-time hostess. Later, Taylor convinces Peter to light a candle with her on the anniversary of Beth’s death and confesses that she added the fake entry in Beth’s diary discussing suicide, which exonerated Peter. Sam becomes increasingly frustrated by Craig’s come-ons and bragging, which Billy observes. When Billy makes a visit to Sam’s studio, he poses shirtless for a sketch. Jane meets Sherry at her mansion but is crestfallen when Sherry says that she cannot be a part of Jane’s life. Despondent, Jane later returns to Sherry’s mansion only to discover she was housesitting. Jane visits Sherry at her apartment, and they embrace. Michael and Kimberly work out the terms of their divorce, and Michael moves into Matt’s old apartment. Matt quits his job at Shooters and agrees to move in with Dan.
143	13	"Crazy Love"	Chip Chalmers	Kathryn Baker	December 16, 1996	2396138	12.0
Peter is frustrated after Amanda schedules a therapy appointment for him and Craig picks up Amanda for a business trip to Santa Barbara. Taylor tells Peter that she loves him, but he tells her to leave him alone. After Peter confronts Amanda and Craig at a restaurant, Amanda returns home and changes the locks on the apartment, leading Peter to confront Taylor for coming to Los Angeles. Sam returns the loft keys to Craig, who refuses to return her courtyard painting. Later, Billy poses as the D&D Design Committee to get the painting returned, and Sam kisses him. Frustrated with Kyle and Sydney’s charity auction, Taylor directs Sydney to auction one of Sam’s paintings, upsetting Sam. At the auction, Sydney accidentally buys the painting for $7,000 while driving up the price, although she later sells the painting to wealthy tech whiz kid Carter Gallavan. Jane is upset when Sherry introduces her as her niece to her neighbor Ed. Later, Sherry reveals that Jane’s father was a B-movie producer that she slept with for a part. Jake surprises Alison with a ski trip where they bond over troubled childhood Christmases. Dan is upset when Matt tells him not to purchase a gift for him at the charity auction. Kimberly tells Megan that she plans to commit suicide so Michael can receive an accidental death insurance payout, but Megan refuses to participate.
144	14	"The Accidental Doctor"	Charles Correll	Edward Gold	January 6, 1997	2396139	12.30
Feeling guilty for their problems, Kyle invites Amanda and Peter to his birthday party, where they fail to reconcile. Peter regains his confidence after performing an emergency tracheotomy on a car accident victim, while Craig watches NFL on Fox with Amanda. When Jane refuses a phone call from Mrs. Andrews, Sydney confronts Sherry for destroying her family, leading Sherry to leave Jane’s apartment. When Jane goes to Sherry’s apartment, Ed tells her that Sherry never got over giving up Jane, and they retrieve Sherry from a bar. Billy and Sam sleep together after Billy buys all of Sam’s paintings at a consignment shop. After Michael hesitates to sign the divorce papers, Kimberly gifts Megan two tickets to Vegas to convince Michael otherwise. However, when Megan visits Kimberly to thank her, Michael observes their meeting through the beach house patio door. Sydney attends one of Carter’s parties, where she is gifted a car. Alison and Jake discuss marriage after receiving an invoice addressed to Mr. and Mrs. Jake Hanson. Dan punches Matt after observing Matt drink alcohol.
145	15	"Escape From L.A."	Richard Lang	Frank South	January 13, 1997	2396140	11.46
When Jane’s boutique is robbed at gunpoint, Jane tries to take comfort in Sherry but finds her advice unhelpful. On Sydney’s urging, Mr. and Mrs. Andrews arrive in Los Angeles, where they express their love to Jane. After Jane announces her plan to return to Chicago, Sherry and Jane express their love for each other. Sherry accepts Ed’s marriage proposal. Jane says goodbye to her friends at the airport and leaves for Chicago. Michael signs the divorce papers after Kimberly and Megan invent a cover story for their meeting. In Las Vegas, Michael and Megan get married. After Kimberly refuses further medical treatment, Peter learns of her diagnosis and calls Michael to share the news. Jake becomes suspicious of Matt’s black eye and expresses his reservations to Billy and Sam. Dan asks Matt for a second chance, and on a double date with Billy and Sam, Matt shares that he's moving in with Dan. When Billy helps Matt move in and asks about the black eye, Dan overhears and pushes Matt through a table for failing to forcefully deny Dan's abuse. Peter visits Amanda at D&D, where she says he reminded her of Palmer and that she needs some time alone. Craig admits to Amanda that he witnessed Arthur’s murder of his grandfather. Alison runs into Sam while buying a pregnancy test. Sydney walks out on Carter due to his busy schedule and rejects an offer from his assistant Walter to pay her to stay. Final appearance of Josie Bissett as Jane Mancini until Season 6.
146	16	"The Eyes of the Storm"	Harvey Frost	Cynthia J. Cohen	January 20, 1997	2396141	12.24
After learning the severity of Kimberly’s illness, Michael says that he won't let her die alone and makes dinner plans with her. Michael asks Megan to keep their marriage private to protect Kimberly’s feelings. When Michael returns for dinner, he finds a suicide note. Elsewhere, Kimberly tries to jump from a pier but fails. Instead, Kimberly rents a motel room and summons Megan to share her plans to commit suicide in a Mulholland Drive car accident during the next storm. When Megan awakens to a storm, she forces Michael to drive to Mulholland and discloses her relationship with Kimberly, accidentally causing Michael to crash head-on with Kimberly. When Sydney asks Kyle to pay for Sam’s paintings in full to pay off boutique debts, Taylor makes the payment conditional on staying away from Kyle, which Sydney rejects. Later, Sydney is angry when Walter pays off her debts but changes her tune when Carter says he cares about her. Amanda blackmails Craig into a larger office, upsetting Arthur. When Arthur arrives to buy Amanda’s silence, he gets into a fight with Craig, leading to a heart attack which proves fatal after Craig stops Amanda from calling 911. Alison learns that she's pregnant and shares the news with an overjoyed Jake. When Jake tells Alison he inquired about a marriage license at City Hall, she feels frustrated but later accepts his formal marriage proposal. After finding abuse complaints in his record, Peter tells Dan to get treatment or face being fired. Later, after a drunken confrontation, Dan tells Matt that he plans to seek treatment. With this episode, Kelly Rutherford is promoted to main cast.
147	17	"Better Homes and Condos"	Janet Greek	James Kahn	January 27, 1997	2396142	12.09
Kimberly and Megan pull Michael from the car accident wreckage. At the hospital, Megan tells Kimberly that she told Michael about their plans. When Michael wakes up, Megan tells him to spend time with Kimberly until she dies, leading to a reluctant agreement whereby Michael will sleep at the beach house. When Sydney evicts Sam from Jane’s apartment, Billy suggests that Sam seek legal counsel, which she does in the form of her ex-boyfriend, Kenny. Over dinner, Billy is frustrated by Kenny, who later provides legal papers to Sam just as Billy prepares to ask Sam to move in. Carter wins over Sydney with a date on a rented sightseeing bus and they spend a weekend in San Francisco. When Carter’s creativity block is ended by Sydney’s sex, Walter tells Sydney to stay away from Carter and lies to Carter that Sydney demanded money for their time together. Craig still feels guilty over his father’s death. Peter gives Amanda his new address and they have breakfast, which Amanda cuts short. Jake gives Alison an engagement ring and shows her a house that he wants to buy. Nick, Kyle’s Marines buddy, arrives to stay with the McBrides, much to Taylor’s chagrin.
148	18	"Great Sexpectations"	Richard Lang	Carol Mendelsohn & Dee Johnson	February 3, 1997	2396143A	11.28
149	19	"Great Sexpectations"	Richard Lang	Carol Mendelsohn & Dee Johnson	February 3, 1997	2396143B	11.28
Peter meets the new chief of staff, Dr. Goldberg, who Taylor observes kissing the selection committee chair in Kyle’s parking lot. Taylor shares the news with Peter, who confronts the committee chair. During a guys’ night out, Nick instigates a brawl at Shooters, which Kyle reconciles by offering to pay for the damages and host a bachelor’s party for Jake. Nick confronts Taylor over her interest in Peter. Amanda and Peter work on their tax return. Elsewhere, Amanda rejects Craig’s offer of money and a relationship. Billy and Sam agree to be the witnesses for Jake and Alison’s marriage. Later, Billy separately warns Alison to be honest with Jake if she's on the fence about marriage and warns Jake not to surprise Alison with a house purchase. After another fight with Sydney, Sam moves in with Billy and they express their love for each other. Megan is frustrated after Kimberly’s non-emergency calls for Michael interrupt her sex life, and when Michael disconnects the phone, he misses a call from a hallucinating Kimberly, who passes out. Carter refuses to talk to Sydney. Amanda seduces Craig into giving her half of his D&D interest, and Craig later learns his father left him nothing. When Peter is named chief of staff, he makes congratulatory dinner plans with Taylor. When Amanda congratulates Peter, he invites her to a hospital dinner where they re-connect, causing Peter to cancel his plans with Taylor. Upon her return to Melrose, Amanda finds Craig drunk on her doorstep and allows him to sleep on the couch. The next morning, when Peter arrives to take Amanda to breakfast, Craig answers the door and lies that he slept with Amanda. When Taylor visits Peter to confront him over their dinner cancellation, he begins making out with her, missing a call from Amanda that she's on her way over. At the hospital, Michael promises Kimberly that he won't sleep with Megan until after her death, leading Megan to walk out on Michael. Later, Kimberly asks Michael to sleep with her. Alison decides against getting married and moves in with Billy and Sam after an argument with Jake over their baby. When Billy and Sam try to push Alison and Jake back together, Alison gets frustrated and decides to visit her sister in San Francisco. Before she leaves, Jake confronts Alison about whether she plans to have an abortion in San Francisco, and he continues to harass her upon her return. After Sydney questions Carter at a speaking event, he tells Sydney that he learned the truth from Walter and quit his business. Kyle tells Nick to move out.
150	20	"Catch Her in the Lie"	Charles Pratt, Jr.	Charles Pratt, Jr.	February 10, 1997	2396144	11.85
Jake visits Alison at D&D and trashes the office before taking a road trip to Sutter’s Creek, where his ex-girlfriend Colleen and son David live. Later, Jake opens up about Alison to Colleen and discusses running away from problems with David. Alison hears her baby’s heartbeat for the first time and shares her anticipation with Billy, as Sam observes them hug. Nick questions Taylor about her night out and moves into his own apartment at Melrose Place. Michael walks in on Peter and Taylor making out. Craig pays Nick to find dirt on Peter. Kyle leaves for Boston, and upon his return, nearly catches Taylor and Peter together in the kitchen. Megan walks out on Michael after he confesses to sleeping with Kimberly, but he says that he won't give up on Megan. Megan attempts to run over Kimberly with her car. Kimberly learns that her tumors are shrinking, which she attributes to Michael’s love. Walter comes looking for Carter at Sydney’s apartment and gets fired. Later, Carter enthusiastically takes a waiter job at Kyle’s and tells Sydney there are no strings attached in their relationship.
151	21	"Men Are From Melrose"	Chip Hayes	Frank South	February 17, 1997	2396145	12.91
Nick observes Taylor and Peter being intimate, but Kyle tells Nick that he trusts his wife. After seeing Nick’s truck outside Peter’s house, Taylor calls Peter to warn him, and he confronts Nick. When Nick overhears Taylor and Peter making phone plans to meet at the golf course, he follows them and photographs them making out. Later, Nick confronts Taylor with the photos and threatens to injure Peter if she doesn't end things, while separately giving Peter an ultimatum to stay away from Taylor. As Jake leaves Sutter’s Creek, Colleen warns him not to be stubborn with Alison, and David shares that he knows Jake is his father. After getting advice from Sam and Amanda, Alison tells Jake that she wants to take a chance with reconciling. Billy and Sam agree to stay out of other people’s business. Megan tells Kimberly that she married Michael, which angers Michael. At the hospital, Michael and Megan learn that Kimberly is in remission. While Michael tells Kimberly that he has to stay with Megan, Megan’s abusive former pimp Josh kidnaps her and holds her captive in her house. When Kyle saves Carter and Sydney from a mugger, Carter observes Sydney’s closeness with Kyle. After overhearing Sydney tell a co-worker that he doesn't make her feel anything, Carter breaks up with Sydney. Doug Savant does not appear in this episode.
152	22	"Frames 'R' Us"	Robert J. Metoyer	James Kahn	February 24, 1997	2396146	12.30
Amanda rents out an apartment to Craig. Taylor invites Nick over under the pretense of an apology but spikes his drink with morphine (provided by Peter), allowing Peter to break into Nick’s apartment and steal his photos of his golf course rendezvous with Taylor. When Nick offers to show proof of Taylor’s affair to Kyle, he finds the photos missing, causing Kyle to fire Nick. Later, Nick taps Taylor’s phone and records her talking dirty to Peter. Working with Nick, the next morning, Craig drives Amanda to Peter’s condo, where she sees Peter and Taylor making out through the window; Peter sees Amanda but ignores her. At Kyle’s, Amanda punches Taylor, and when a drunken Peter calls Amanda to ask how it feels to be cheated on, she sleeps with Craig. Josh calls Megan demanding $1,000. Kimberly, revealed to be working with Josh, tells him that she only wants Michael and Megan to divorce. While Megan goes to a hotel room to deliver the money, Josh tells Michael that Megan is still a sex worker and tricks him into calling the hotel room, where Megan answers. Michael walks out on Megan after Josh arrives to collect his money, but they later reconcile. Later, Josh makes plans with Kimberly to “accidentally” show a videotape of Megan having sex at a hospital conference. At the conference, Josh threatens to show the tape unless Megan resumes sex work. Kimberly tells Michael she accepts his decision to stay with Megan. Billy, Sam, Alison, and Jake realize that Sydney isn't on vacation with Carter. Doug Savant does not appear in this episode.
153	23	"Screams From a Marriage"	Charles Correll	Edward Gold	March 3, 1997	2396147	11.89
Taylor is angered after Peter says Amanda saw them together and he failed to tell her. Kyle learns from his chef that Amanda punched Taylor and confronts Taylor over her false alibi. Later, Kyle visits Nick for more information, and he plays back the recording of Taylor and Peter’s phone sex. Angered, Kyle kicks Taylor out of the restaurant. Elsewhere, Nick demands $5,000 from Taylor in order to prevent an assault on Peter. In the hospital parking lot, Nick beats up Peter despite Taylor’s arrival. The next day, Kyle ends his friendship with Nick and sees him off at the bus depot, while Kyle rejects Taylor’s apology and kicks her out of the apartment. Amanda calls a divorce lawyer after Taylor taunts that she's moving in with Peter. Josh tells Megan that Kimberly is behind his plan and they plot to expose her. Kimberly signs off on Josh’s plan to have Michael catch Megan with a client. However, Josh double-crosses both Megan and Kimberly by setting up Megan with an undercover cop, who arrests her. After Michael begrudgingly bails Megan out of jail, Josh tries to push her back into sex work, threatening to beat her if she doesn't, like he did in the past. After the death of his brother Luke, Matt picks up his teenage niece Chelsea at the airport, who was detained for getting drunk on the flight. After the funeral, Matt and his mother are surprised when Luke’s will names Matt as Chelsea’s legal guardian. Grant Show does not appear in this episode.
154	24	"101 Damnations"	Richard Lang	Carol Mendelsohn	March 10, 1997	2396148	12.12
Alison is ordered 2 weeks of bedrest due to an incompetent cervix. Later, Alison overhears Taylor tell Kyle that Peter is her brother-in-law, and when Alison tells Jake, he warns her not to tell Amanda. When Kyle cuts his finger in the kitchen, he ends up in the ER and Taylor walks in just as Kyle admits to Peter that he slept with Sydney. Kyle signs an agreement dividing the restaurant’s operations and profits with Taylor. Jake tells Amanda that Taylor is Peter’s former sister-in-law, leading a drunken Amanda to confront Peter and Taylor with Craig in tow. Peter distances himself from Taylor after she admits to setting him up. Megan is evicted by her landlord and leaves a farewell note and her wedding ring for Michael. When Megan calls Michael to say goodbye, he uses *69 to track her to a motel. At the motel, the manager tells Michael that Megan is likely working the street, where Michael picks her up and they agree to continue their marriage. Sydney gets sued after a patron trips over an unsafe display. Chelsea moves in with Matt on a trial basis but annoys the other residents with her loud music and accidentally sets a small fire. Later, Chelsea runs off after overhearing Matt tell his mother that she should take custody.
155	25	"From Here to Maternity"	Thomas Calabro	Dee Johnson	March 17, 1997	2396149	11.72
Kimberly suffers an aneurysm after Michael tells her that he's staying with Megan. Megan is hired as the Burns-Mancini receptionist and uses practice funds to hire a nurse for Kimberly. When a disbelieving Michael visits Kimberly to confront her over her illness, he realizes the severity of her condition and summons her mother to Los Angeles. Matt and Sam search for Chelsea and eventually find her at Covenant House, where she agrees to return home with Matt. Later, Matt lets Chelsea move in permanently after his mother’s homophobic objections to his “anti-family lifestyle.” Sam’s controlling father surprises his daughter with a visit, having just been released from prison. Taylor admits to Kyle that she moved to Los Angeles to be with Peter, while Peter continues to be cold to Taylor. Amanda gives Kyle new keys to his apartment, and they admit their first impressions of each other were off. Elsewhere, Amanda tells Craig that she's taking a vow of celibacy. Alison spends a day working at D&D over Jake’s objections. That evening, Alison suffers abdominal pain and calls Jake. Sydney unsuccessfully tries to reach a settlement with Hilda’s lawyer.
156	26	"Last Exit to Ohio"	Jefferson Kibbee	Frank South	March 31, 1997	2396150	11.50
Mrs. Shaw arrives in Los Angeles and butts heads with Michael over her plan to bring Kimberly back to Cleveland. When Kimberly asks Megan for a ride to visit Michael one last time, Mrs. Shaw catches them leaving and erupts in anger, triggering a fatal medical episode in Kimberly. Despite his reservations, and at Megan’s urging, Michael pays his respects to Kimberly as her coffin is loaded aboard a train to Ohio. Sydney bungles her attempt to record Hilda faking her injury and later has her assets seized in a legal settlement. Afterwards, Hilda’s lawyer suggests that Sydney start filing her own phony lawsuits. Alison is diagnosed with toxemia and told she must terminate her pregnancy or risk death. After the operation, Alison proposes to Jake, who says it doesn't matter to him if Alison cannot have children. After he moves in, Jim Reilly overhears as Sam tells Billy that she testified against her father, putting him in jail, and how he physically abused her and her mother. Craig is frustrated when Amanda invites Kyle to join them at a club opening. Later, Amanda turns down Kyle’s invitation to go bowling. After dreaming that Taylor is Beth, Peter buys for Taylor clothes that remind him of Beth. Chelsea’s mother calls to say that she's coming to Los Angeles to bring Chelsea back to Paris.
157	27	"The Dead Wives Club"	Chip Chalmers	Charles Pratt, Jr.	April 7, 1997	2396151	10.00
Hilda’s lawyer, Harry, gives Sydney a taste of easy money when he pulls her parking brake during a car ride. Kyle hires Sydney as a waitress and they eventually share a kiss, but Kyle tells her he's not ready for a relationship. After seeing Kyle and Amanda together, Sydney decides to target D&D with a phony lawsuit. D&D wins an award for their ad for Kyle’s restaurant and Amanda announces a cocktail party to celebrate. At the D&D party, Harry removes the skid tape from a stair tread and Sydney intentionally throws herself down the spiral staircase. Michael and Megan decide to keep the beach house after Kimberly leaves it to them in her will. Kimberly appears to Megan in a dream and tells her to keep the beach house and temper Michael’s ambition. Michael tries to frame Peter with a conflict of interest but is unsuccessful due to Megan’s meddling. While initially reluctant, Taylor gives in to Peter’s fantasies about Beth. Jake and Alison take a road trip until their car breaks down. Stuck in a small town, they get married on an impulse and later toast champagne to their marriage, although Jake hesitates to serve alcohol to Alison. Chelsea’s mother Denise arrives, and while initially cold, they eventually open up about their love for each other and Chelsea moves in with Denise. Sam is upset by Billy’s suspicions about Jim but later gets a visit from LAPD asking for Jim’s whereabouts, as he has escaped prison. Final appearance of Marcia Cross as Kimberly Shaw.
158	28	"Deja Vu, All Over Again"	James Darren	Neil Landau	April 14, 1997	2396152	11.57
Having accidentally deferred staircase repairs required by D&D’s insurer, Craig decides to be nice to Sydney so she will drop her lawsuit. Amanda and Kyle discuss their dreams at an art museum, and Amanda later offers to invest in Kyle’s jazz club idea. Michael’s younger sister Jennifer arrives in Los Angeles, having graduated from Boston College early. Jennifer bombs her D&D interview on purpose and lies to Michael that Amanda was rude to her, while Michael and Megan discuss the Mancini family. Colleen surprises Jake during a business trip to Los Angeles. Over dinner, Colleen asks Jake if David can call him occasionally as Alison frustratedly sips wine. Later, Jake reassures Alison that he loves her. Sam lies to Billy that Jim has left for Chicago. Later, she borrows Billy’s ATM card to give money to Jim to escape to Mexico. Peter snaps in anger at Taylor over her Beth impersonation before they have sex. After getting advice from Sam, Matt obtains a court order preventing Denise from taking Chelsea back to Europe. With this episode, David Charvet is promoted to main cast. First appearance of Alyssa Milano as Jennifer Mancini. Initially recurring, she would be made a series regular from season 6.
159	29	"All Beths Are Off"	Charles Correll	Chip Hayes	April 21, 1997	2396153	10.86
Over dinner, Jennifer recognizes Kyle and later confronts him over their affair in Boston. Jennifer moves out of the beach house after Michael learns she failed to graduate. Amanda and Kyle become partners in Kyle’s jazz club, and Taylor later informs Amanda of the Kyle/Jennifer affair. Michael agrees to help rein in Peter after Taylor becomes uncomfortable with his increasingly violent sexual fantasies. Craig gives spa vouchers to Sydney, and when he invites her to dinner, they discuss their past relationships and parents. After returning to Melrose, Sydney and Craig kiss after Craig pushes Amanda’s hired spy into the pool. Billy is appalled to see Jake allowing Alison to drink, and Amanda fires Alison from D&D after Alison makes an offer to Midline Airways that D&D could not honor. Later, Jake and Alison decide to adopt a child. Increasingly suspicious, Billy tracks Sam from her new supermarket job to a motel, where he sees Jim answering the door. Jim asks Sam for $1,000. Denise advises Chelsea to keep a diary of Matt’s activities that they can use in court. Later, Chelsea observes Matt allowing a friend to sleep on the couch after their mutual friend dies of AIDS.
160	30	"Ultimatums and the Single Guy"	Anson Williams	Dee Johnson	April 28, 1997	2396154	11.77
Kyle is frustrated when Amanda asks for a contract for their jazz club partnership, so he conditions it on their respective divorces. Later, Peter and Taylor sign divorce papers, although Peter is reluctant. Michael gets inspiration from a rage epilepsy patient as he schemes with Taylor to bring down Peter. Sam admits to Billy that Jim escaped from prison, and Billy forces Sam to say goodbye to her father. When Jim shows up at Sam’s job, she tells him that she can’t help him anymore. Billy lies about Jim’s whereabouts to LAPD but gets arrested when Amanda tells the police that Jim stayed in Billy and Sam’s apartment. Jake and Alison interview with an adoption counselor, but she catches them drunk upon returning to their apartment to retrieve an appointment book. Later, Jake suggests that he and Alison move out of Melrose Place for a new life. Sydney agrees to settle with D&D to avoid financially hurting Craig, but Harry threatens to expose Sydney as a fraud if she settles. Jennifer gets hired as a strip club waitress and discusses her past with Megan. Matt and Denise work out their joint custody of Chelsea as Matt promises to Chelsea that he won’t put her in the middle of the court case.
161	31	"Going Places"	Charles Pratt, Jr.	Carol Mendelsohn	May 5, 1997	2396155	10.54
Kyle rescues Jennifer from the strip club and allows her to stay in his apartment while he travels with Amanda to the Dominican Republic to file their divorces. Amanda and Kyle bond overseas, but Amanda is dismayed to see Jennifer in Kyle’s apartment upon their return. Sydney admits to Craig that her lawsuit was fraudulent, and Harry agrees to settle after Craig destroys his file on Sydney. Later, Craig hires Sydney as a D&D consultant as part of the settlement. Taylor serves Peter a spiked drink, making him fall unconscious, during which time she and Michael intentionally bruise herself and Peter to frame him for abuse. Billy and Sam are released from police custody. After a night at Shooters, they return home to find Jim, who demands $10,000. When Billy delivers the money, Jim punches Billy and says he won’t leave the country without Sam. Jake and Alison decide to buy a restaurant in Ojai, and Alison later overhears Jake discussing children with Matt. Matt and Denise argue after Chelsea is injured at school and Matt is too busy in surgery to care for her.
162	32	"Secrets and Lies and More Lies"	Frank South	Frank South	May 12, 1997	2396156	10.22
Taylor lies to Peter that he beat her. Megan becomes suspicious of Michael’s location and sees him with Taylor. Michael and Taylor drug Peter a second time, and after running some tests, Michael falsely diagnoses Peter with rage epilepsy. Sydney questions the profitability of Kyle’s Upstairs Jazz Club at a D&D meeting, and Craig and Sydney later plot to bring down Amanda. Elsewhere, Amanda and Kyle share a kiss. At the Upstairs, Amanda is dismayed to see Jennifer behind the bar and Sydney taunts Amanda into dancing with Craig, who rejects her as Kyle watches. Jim tells Sam that he won’t leave the U.S. without her. Sam and Billy come clean about Jim’s whereabouts to LAPD, which sets up an unsuccessful sting operation that Jim watches from afar. Colleen and David show up on Jake’s doorstep after Colleen’s husband leaves her. As Jake and David spend time together, Alison resumes drinking and confronts Colleen. Matt and Chelsea express their familial love.
163	33	"Who's Afraid of Amanda Woodward?"	Charles Correll	Charles Pratt, Jr.	May 19, 1997	2396157A	11.83
164	34	"Who's Afraid of Amanda Woodward?"	Charles Correll	Charles Pratt, Jr.	May 19, 1997	2396157B	11.83
Michael tells Megan about Peter’s rage epilepsy and abuse. Taylor intentionally wears a low-cut dress to a hospital fundraiser, angering Peter, which Dr. Shulman and Megan notice. When Dr. Shulman calls a meeting to remove Peter as chief of staff, Michael convinces him to resign and name Michael his replacement. Sydney forgives Craig and later accepts his marriage proposal. Elsewhere, Sydney and Craig form Sky High Advertising. Amanda reconciles with Kyle but suffers a panic attack as she loses control of D&D. Sam is arrested by LAPD on charges that she tipped off Jim to the sting, but she is released when Billy agrees to surveil her. Sam is angered by Billy’s questions about Jim and the revelation that LAPD has tapped her phone after Jim calls. After telling Jake that she won’t co-sign the deed for the Ojai restaurant, Alison works to intentionally push Jake away from her and towards Colleen and David. Chelsea flees to Matt’s after Denise comes home drunk with a friend who makes sexual advances on her. At the court hearing, Matt is questioned about his sexuality and Chelsea testifies about her mother’s friend. Peter learns from another doctor that he doesn’t have rage epilepsy and overhears Taylor calling Michael to ask about their next move. At the office, Peter pushes Michael through a glass window before taking Taylor on an impromptu getaway, where he attempts to push Taylor off a lighthouse before she shares that she is pregnant. Kyle and Amanda have an argument at the hospital, but when Matt tells Kyle that Amanda’s leaving for New York, he goes to see Amanda and they admit that they need each other. Sam rejects Billy’s apology. Jim robs Sam’s supermarket and forces her to drive the getaway car at gunpoint. Sam decides to drive to the wedding instead and loses control of her car, colliding with Sydney outside the church. Alison encourages David to ask Colleen to stay in California. With David’s encouragement, Jake asks Colleen to move to Ojai with him and she accepts. Alison moves to Atlanta for a new start. Denise tearfully tells Matt that he is the better parent and Chelsea should stay with him. Final appearances of Laura Leighton as Sydney Andrews, Grant Show as Jake Hanson, and Courtney Thorne-Smith as Alison Parker, although Sydney’s death would be retconned and Leighton would appear on the Melrose Place reboot.

== Controversies ==
In 1996, actress Hunter Tylo was cast in Melrose Place and opted to leave daytime soap opera The Bold and the Beautiful to take the role. However, she was fired by Melrose Place producer Aaron Spelling prior to filming any episodes for the series, when she announced she was pregnant. The character she was to play, Taylor McBride, was recast, Lisa Rinna taking the role. Tylo quickly returned to The Bold and the Beautiful. Tylo sued Spelling on grounds of discrimination for being pregnant and won $4.8 million from a Los Angeles jury. Spelling argued that Tylo's pregnancy rendered her unable to play the character, who was supposed to be a sexy seductress. During the trial, Tylo published pictures of herself while pregnant which showed that she retained a slim figure. Prior to trial, during the discovery phase of the litigation, Tylo's lawyers won a partial victory in an interlocutory appeal challenging a lower court's order compelling her to answer a broad range of personal questions. The Court of Appeal established Tylo's right to refuse to answer questions in her deposition about marital problems and psychological treatment, although the Court sustained the portion of the order which compelled her to answer questions about her efforts to become pregnant, her husband's ability or inability to impregnate her, and communications with her agent with respect to her efforts and ability to become pregnant. The case is widely recognized as an important one in establishing the right of privacy in deposition and the right of female actors to continue to work while pregnant.
