= Beverly Hills, 90210 (franchise) =

Media franchise

- Created by: Darren Star
- Original work: Beverly Hills, 90210
- Owner: CBS Studios
- Years: 1990–2019

Films and television
- Television series: Beverly Hills, 90210; Melrose Place (1992); Models Inc.; 90210; Melrose Place (2009); BH90210

Beverly Hills, 90210 is a media franchise created by Darren Star and owned by CBS Studios, comprising the American television series Beverly Hills, 90210 (1990); Melrose Place (1992); Models Inc. (1994); 90210 (2008); Melrose Place (2009); and the 2019 revival BH90210, which takes place outside of the franchise continuity.

The continuity, which progresses in real time, was introduced in 1990 with the debut of Darren Star's teen drama Beverly Hills, 90210, which was produced by Aaron Spelling and initially aired on the FOX television network in the United States. After this series became a worldwide success in 1991, Star expanded the franchise with 1992's Melrose Place, a drama about young adults in Los Angeles. The third series, Models Inc., aired from June 1994 to March 1995.

The fourth entry, simply titled 90210, was developed by Rob Thomas, Gabe Sachs, and Jeff Judah, and premiered on The CW on September 2, 2008. On September 8, 2009, the fifth series, a follow-up to Melrose Place, also debuted on The CW, and concluded in April 2010.

The franchise has been generally well received among young audiences. Some characters have appeared in multiple shows throughout the continuity. Jennie Garth, Tori Spelling, Brian Austin Green, and Ian Ziering are the only actors who appeared in a show's entire run, while Grant Show appeared in all three of the original series.

In February 2019, it was announced that a six-episode revival, set outside of continuity, had been ordered by FOX and that the show would be titled BH90210. The series aired between August and September 2019.

== Production ==
While planning a new teen drama in 1989–1990, executives at FOX learned of Darren Star's interest in writing youth-oriented screenplays. Upon being hired by the network, Star created the concept and characters for the series that would eventually become Beverly Hills, 90210. The unexpected worldwide success of this project, as well as that of the spin-off Melrose Place, was largely credited with launching Star's career, while bringing early fortune to FOX in the process.

Aaron Spelling, whose company produced the shows, was well known for producing some of the most famous hit series on television, including Charlie's Angels (1976–81), The Love Boat (1977–86), and Dynasty (1981–89). Spelling would also produce the next show in the franchise, Models Inc., in 1994.

Melrose Place was initially inspired by Star's own professional aspirations during his 20s, while Models Inc. was born when FOX asked Spelling for an eight-part summer series. When ratings proved adequate, the show continued throughout the following television season. Models Inc. concluded in 1995, Melrose Place finished in 1999, and Beverly Hills, 90210 ended in 2000.

In 2008, the franchise returned via the fourth production, 90210, attracting a new collection of noted creators. Rob Thomas, known for the television show Veronica Mars, began the initial work on the project. Prior to the premiere, Thomas was succeeded by producers Jeff Judah and Gabe Sachs, both known for the series Freaks and Geeks and Undeclared. During the first season, Rebecca Sinclair, who had previously worked on Gilmore Girls and Buffy the Vampire Slayer, became the series' new show runner. In June 2009, a fifth production, a follow-up to Melrose Place, was officially confirmed.

== Writers ==
Emmy-nominated scribe Charles Rosin joined Beverly Hills, 90210 in its first year and served as a writer and executive producer, scripting several episodes in seasons to come along with his wife Karen. Other prominent writers of the first series included John Eisendrath and Steve Wasserman.

Charles Pratt, Jr. and Frank South worked closely with Darren Star in writing early seasons of Melrose Place, helping to set the tone of the series as it grew in popularity. Pratt and South would then create the similarly toned Models Inc. Rebecca Sinclair wrote for 90210 during the first season prior to her promotion.

== Casting ==
Throughout its run, the franchise has attracted several established actors, while bringing fame to others and the roles which they have portrayed. The narrative's most widely seen character is Jennie Garth's Kelly Taylor, who was instrumental in launching two spin-offs, and has been used in the most episodes throughout the continuity. Also made famous via the first program was male lead Jason Priestley, who earned Golden Globe nominations and began a directorial career via the series, and actor Luke Perry, who won acclaim and drew comparisons to James Dean. The first series brought fame to several other cast members as well.

Melrose Place featured former Dynasty and T. J. Hooker star Heather Locklear, whose performance has been called one of the most prominent of the show, and also starred former child actress Alyssa Milano. Models Inc. featured former Dallas actress Linda Gray, and later added Dynasty veteran Emma Samms. In addition, several actors known for their work in American daytime television—including Kristian Alfonso, Stephen Nichols, Jack Wagner, and Vanessa Marcil—have made appearances in the franchise.

In 2009, singer-actress Ashlee Simpson joined the proposed fifth series of the continuity, a follow-up to Melrose Place, as Violet Foster. It was later announced that Laura Leighton would reprise her role as Sydney Andrews (despite the character having apparently died during the original series), who was recognized by The Hollywood Reporter as "one of the most popular characters" from the previous show. Friday Night Lights actress Aimee Teegarden appeared in the fourth series, 90210, during its first season. Additionally, 90210's Sara Foster and Shenae Grimes have revealed that they were fans of the original show while growing up.

Several actors have gone on to additional fame following their work in the franchise. Marcia Cross, who would later star in Desperate Housewives, played Kimberly Shaw in the original Melrose Place from its first season until its fifth. Kristin Davis joined Melrose Place in 1995, and starred afterward in the HBO series Sex and the City. Additionally, Kelly Rutherford, later known for her work in the series Gossip Girl, joined MP in 1996, remaining with the show until its 1999 conclusion. Carrie-Anne Moss, of The Matrix fame, starred in Models Inc. throughout its duration.

Dean Cain, who would go on to star in Lois & Clark: The New Adventures of Superman, appeared in Beverly Hills, 90210 during 1992, while Eddie Cibrian, later known for his role in Third Watch, guest-starred in 1996. Vivica A. Fox, Hilary Swank, Jessica Alba, Matthew Perry, Peter Krause, and David Arquette all appeared in the first show as well. Actor Kellan Lutz guest-starred in the fourth series throughout its first season.

== Series ==
=== Beverly Hills, 90210 ===
Beverly Hills, 90210 logo

Debuting on October 4, 1990, the first series initially followed the teenage lives of several friends who attended the West Beverly Hills High School: Brandon Walsh (Jason Priestley), Brenda Walsh (Shannen Doherty), Kelly Taylor (Jennie Garth), Steve Sanders (Ian Ziering), Andrea Zuckerman (Gabrielle Carteris), Dylan McKay (Luke Perry), David Silver (Brian Austin Green), Scott Scanlon (Douglas Emerson), and Donna Martin (Tori Spelling). As the series progressed, several other characters were introduced at varying points.

Originally, the series centered around the culture shock of twins Brandon and Brenda as they adjusted to the new experiences and friends that awaited them upon their family's move to Beverly Hills. As the show progressed, however, it gradually became more of an ensemble cast drama, with equal attention given to the familial issues, academic matters, career aspirations, and love lives of the other characters. One of the series' early focal points involved a briefly forbidden Brenda-Dylan relationship—along with a subsequent triangle involving Kelly. Other prominent stories included the beginning of a long relationship between Brandon and Kelly, a similar bond between Donna and David, and a rally organized on Donna's behalf in order to overturn a school ruling against her. The series ended on May 17, 2000, after 293 episodes and multiple cast changes; it is the longest-running show of the franchise to date.

Toward the end of the second season, the character Jake Hanson—an older friend and mentor to Dylan—briefly arrived for a construction job at Kelly's house. The subsequent attraction that developed between a resistant Jake (Grant Show) and a willing Kelly led into the second series of the Beverly Hills, 90210 franchise.

=== Melrose Place ===
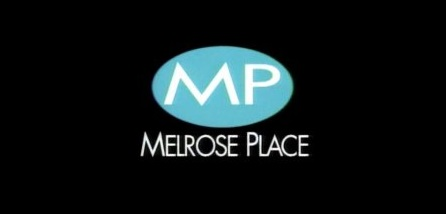
Melrose Place logo

Darren Star's next show, which premiered on July 8, 1992, followed the lives of several young tenants in a Los Angeles apartment complex. The relationship between Kelly and Jake was resolved over a series of episodes, with a persistent Kelly visiting Jake in L.A., and eventually letting go and returning to Beverly Hills.

Originally conceived as a fairly straight-faced drama about the personal and professional lives of people in their twenties and early thirties, Melrose Place began to change with the arrival of testy Amanda Woodward (Heather Locklear), whose conflicts with the generally straight-laced Alison (Courtney Thorne-Smith) over Alison's roommate Billy (Andrew Shue) quickly became the show's centerpiece. Also focused upon was the adulterous relationship between Dr. Michael Mancini (Thomas Calabro) and his colleague Kimberly Shaw (Marcia Cross), which was eventually discovered by Michael's wife Jane (Josie Bissett). The first season also introduced Jane's sister Sydney (Laura Leighton), an occasional vixen, who would become one of the most layered and prominent characters of the series.

With the progression of the second season—which was highlighted by divorce, blackmail, revenge, character revamps, and much angst between couples—the show had begun to secure a reputation for darker, more extraordinary story lines. This kind of writing would become standard for the series throughout the remainder of its run. The series ended on May 24, 1999, after 226 episodes.

Toward the end of season 2, a somewhat mellowed Amanda was reunited with her long-estranged mother Hillary (Linda Gray), the owner of a modeling agency. This development would provide a foundation for the franchise's third story.

=== Models Inc. ===
Models Inc. logo

Models Inc. premiered on June 29, 1994, and was created by Charles Pratt Jr. and Frank South and produced by Spelling Television. The series followed Hillary and the ambitious models working at her agency, some of whom she developed maternal bonds with. Hillary's son, David (Brian Gaskill), served as the agency's vice president and was portrayed as loyal but occasionally hot-headed. In the series premiere, Grant Show and Daphne Zuniga made brief cameo appearances as their Melrose Place characters, seeing off aspiring model Sarah Ownes (Cassidy Rae) as she departed for the agency.

Unlike the previous two shows in the continuity, Models Inc. did not experience any significant changes in character focus or tone. Instead, the writers chose to explore the ensemble cast from the start and immediately present the kind of story lines that had made Melrose Place famous. The initial focus of the series was a mystery surrounding the murder of model Teri Spencer (Stephanie Romanov), who'd announced her intentions to leave the agency. For a number of episodes throughout the first story arc, suspects included Hillary, Teri's ex-boyfriend Brian (Cameron Daddo), Teri's rival Julie (Kylie Travis), and Teri's own sister Carrie (Carrie-Anne Moss). Once the killer was revealed, the characters moved on, with their focus switching to the arrival of Stephanie Romanov's new character Monique, a model who was a nearly dead ringer for Teri. The remainder of the series largely centered around the models' growing relationships with their boyfriends and each other, while also dealing with the issues of substance abuse and the pressures of the business. Primary antagonists included several figures from the models' pasts—including a stalker, a jealous sister, and Grayson (Emma Samms), the cunning and powerful ex-wife of Monique's fiancé.

The series was canceled in March 1995. Jake Hanson, who was originally introduced in the continuity's first show, was the only character to appear in both Beverly Hills, 90210 and Models Inc.

=== 90210 ===
90210 logo

Premiering on September 2, 2008, 90210 was produced by CBS Television Studios. The series introduces two siblings—Annie and Dixon Wilson (Dixon is adopted), played by Shenae Grimes and Tristan Wilds—who move to Beverly Hills with their family and enroll in West Beverly High. Like Brandon and Brenda Walsh 18 years before, Dixon and Annie meet several new friends who comprise the rest of the cast, including Erin Silver (Jessica Stroup), the half-sister of David Silver and Kelly Taylor from the original series. The character Naomi Clark (AnnaLynne McCord) gained significant media attention throughout the first season, and was given increased focus at the onset of the second.

Among the returning characters was Kelly Taylor, who appeared in a recurring role while serving as a guidance counselor at the school. Brenda Walsh also returned in a recurring part, reuniting with Kelly and directing a school musical. Donna Martin returned as well, coming back to Beverly Hills from Japan, where she worked as a fashion designer. In addition, Joe E. Tata made guest appearances, reprising his role of Nat Bussichio, owner of the Peach Pit coffee house where Dixon worked. The series concluded in May 2013, following its fifth season.

=== Melrose Place (2009) ===
Melrose Place logo

On January 19, 2009, Entertainment Weekly confirmed that Todd Slavkin and Darren Swimmer were installed as showrunners of a Melrose Place spin-off, which used the same title as the previous show. The series premiered on September 8, 2009. Ashlee Simpson, Shaun Sipos, Jessica Lucas, Stephanie Jacobsen, Katie Cassidy, Michael Rady, and Colin Egglesfield were cast in regular roles. Throughout 2009, it was also revealed that Laura Leighton, Thomas Calabro, Josie Bissett, Daphne Zuniga, and Heather Locklear would make appearances as their characters from the original series. The show was officially canceled on May 20, 2010.

=== BH90210 ===
In 2017, Jennie Garth revealed that a possible sixth series in the franchise, a follow-up to the original show, was being officially discussed. In December 2018 it was reported on Deadline Hollywood that a reboot or a revival of Beverly Hills, 90210 was being shopped around to different networks. The project was initially developed by Tori Spelling and Jennie Garth in conjunction with CBS Television Studios, and was first hinted at by Spelling on her Instagram page the previous March. The bulk of the original cast is attached, including Garth, Spelling, Shannen Doherty, Jason Priestley, Ian Ziering, Brian Austin Green and Gabrielle Carteris. CBS confirmed on December 18 that the project was in "early development", adding "We aren't confirming much detail except that it is an untraditional take on a reboot with some of the original cast".

On February 27, 2019, it was announced that a six-episode revival had been ordered by Fox. Titled BH90210, the series was set outside of continuity and featured the cast playing "heightened versions of themselves" in an irreverent drama "inspired by their real lives and relationships with each other." The show premiered on August 7, 2019, at 9/8c on Fox.

== Actors with multiple roles and franchise appearances ==
Several actors have either reprised their role in other series, or portrayed more than one character throughout the continuity, many of them appearing as regulars on one series and as guest stars on another. In some cases, a performer has appeared in different roles on the same show.

Color key
Main cast
Recurring guest star (3+ episodes)
Guest star (1–2 episodes)

Actor	Character					
Actor	Beverly Hills, 90210 (1990–00)	Melrose Place (1992–99)	Models Inc. (1994–95)	90210 (2008–13)	Melrose Place (2009–10)	BH90210 (2019)
First appeared in Beverly Hills, 90210
Jason Priestley	Brandon Walsh			director		Jason Priestley
Shannen Doherty	Brenda Walsh			Brenda Walsh		Shannen Doherty
Jennie Garth	Kelly Taylor	Kelly Taylor		Kelly Taylor		Jennie Garth
Ian Ziering	Steve Sanders	Steve Sanders				Ian Ziering
Gabrielle Carteris	Andrea Zuckerman					Gabrielle Carteris
Brian Austin Green	David Silver	David Silver				Brian Austin Green
Tori Spelling	Donna Martin	Donna Martin		Donna Martin		Tori Spelling
Carol Potter	Cindy Walsh					Carol Potter
Joe E. Tata	Nat Bussichio			Nat Bussichio		
Ann Gillespie	Jackie Taylor			Jackie Taylor		
Christine Elise	Emily Valentine					Christine Elise
Denise Richards	Robin McGill	Brandi Carson		Gwen Thompson		Denise Richards
Brooke Langton	Suds Lipton	Samantha Reilly				
Dina Meyer	Lucinda Nicholson			Sheila		
Jamie Walters	Ray Pruit					Jamie Walters
John Reilly	Bill Taylor	Mack McBride				
Greg Vaughan	Cliff Yeager			Kai		
First appeared in Melrose Place
Josie Bissett		Jane Mancini			Jane Mancini	
Thomas Calabro		Michael Mancini			Michael Mancini	
Grant Show	Jake Hanson	Jake Hanson	Jake Hanson			
James Handy	Tom Rose	Matt Fielding Sr.				
Claudette Nevins	Vivian Carson	Constance Fielding				
Daphne Zuniga		Jo Reynolds	Jo Reynolds		Jo Reynolds	
Laura Leighton	Sophie Burns	Sydney Andrews			Sydney Andrews	
Linden Ashby		Charles Reynolds				
Linden Ashby		Brett Cooper				
Heather Locklear		Amanda Woodward			Amanda Woodward	
Rob Estes		Sam Towler		Harry Wilson		
Rob Estes		Kyle McBride				
James Wilder		Reed Carter	Adam Louder			
Stanley Kamel	Anthony Marchette	Bruce Teller				
Lonnie Schuyler		Dr. Dave Smith; Alan Ross	Drew; Ben Singer			
Cassidy Rae		Sarah Owens	Sarah Owens			
Linda Gray		Hillary Michaels	Hillary Michaels	Victoria Brewer		
Stephanie Romanov		Teri Spencer	Teri Spencer; Monique Duran			
First appeared in Models Inc.
Teresa Hill		Claire Duncan	Linda Holden			
John Haymes Newton		Ryan McBride	Rev. Mark Warriner			
Nancy Lee Grahn		Denise Fielding	Detective Towers			
First appeared in 90210
Jessica Lucas				Kimberly MacIntyre	Riley Richmond	
First appeared in Melrose Place
Nick Zano				Preston Hillingsbrook	Drew Pragin	

== Reception ==
Beverly Hills, 90210 has been called "one of the definitive shows of the 1990s." In a look back at the series, TV Guide labeled the program "soapy and addictive". In 1994, the series ranked No. 1 among viewers aged 18–34. The show was nominated for "Best Drama" at the Golden Globe Awards in 1992 and 1993, with Jason Priestley being nominated for "Best Performance by an Actor In A Television Series—Drama" in 1993 and 1995.

Entertainment Weekly's Ken Tucker criticized the original tone of Melrose Place in a 1992 article, stating that "on this show, everybody's a philosopher—even more unusual, a philosopher with a cute bottom." Despite giving the series a mixed review, he admitted to being "hypnotized by it" and added that "Melrose is the guilty pleasure that adds some salt and sweat to summertime TV." The show received an overhaul as it advanced toward its second season, with TV Guide citing the "bed-hopping, backstabbing and cliffhangers" as key factors in its success, also noting the arrival of Heather Locklear's Amanda Woodward. In 1994, the series became the No. 2-rated drama among viewers aged 18–34 (behind Beverly Hills, 90210), with People magazine labeling it a "compulsively watchable, high-trash hit." Locklear and Laura Leighton were nominated for Golden Globe Awards in 1994, with Locklear receiving additional nominations from 1995 through 1997.

In his review of Models Inc., Ken Tucker claimed that the show was "trying much too hard to match Melrose for self-consciously outrageous campiness." However, he commended the work of Kylie Travis as vixen Julie Dante. Entertainment Weekly also screened the series in front of young real-life models, who concluded that the show was unrealistic but addictive. The series ended in 1995, but later aired an alternate ending during a rebroadcast of the finale, bringing closure to the story lines.

At the time of its premiere, 90210, which marked a return for the franchise following an eight-year absence, became the highest-rated scripted debut in the history of The CW network. In the midst of its first season, the show was nominated for "Favorite New Drama" at the 2009 People's Choice Awards. Upon the completion of season 1, the show received additional nominations from the Teen Choice Awards, including "Breakout Show" and "Choice TV Show: Drama". AnnaLynne McCord was nominated for "Breakout Star Female" in the role of Naomi Clark, Tristan Wilds was placed in contention for "Breakout Star Male", and Dustin Milligan was nominated for "Choice TV Actor: Drama". Additionally, Rob Estes and Lori Loughlin were nominees for "Choice TV: Parental Unit". The following year, Shenae Grimes was nominated for "Choice TV: Female Scene Stealer". At the 2010 Breakthrough of the Year Awards, AnnaLynne McCord won in the category of "Breakthrough Standout Performance".

On September 2, 2010 (9/02/10), Reuters.com featured an article on the original series. Via a Twitter message the same day, Jennie Garth stated, "Love to the original cast and crew. And the new kids too."
