= Beverly Hills, 90210 season 1 =

Beverly Hills, 90210
- Season 1
- DVD cover
- Starring: Jason Priestley Shannen Doherty Jennie Garth Ian Ziering Gabrielle Carteris Luke Perry Brian Austin Green Douglas Emerson Tori Spelling Carol Potter James Eckhouse
- No. of episodes: 22

Release
- Original network: Fox
- Original release: October 4, 1990 – May 9, 1991

Season chronology
- Next → Season 2

The first season of Beverly Hills, 90210, an American teen drama television series aired from October 4, 1990, on Fox and concluded on May 9, 1991, after 22 episodes. The series follows twins Brandon and Brenda Walsh during their sophomore year in high school as they deal with everyday teenage issues such as rumors, peer pressure, shoplifting, sex, affirmative action, dysfunctional families, cancer scares, learning disabilities, rape, alcohol abuse, and AIDS.

The series aired Thursdays at 9/8c in the United States averaging 14.2 million viewers a week. Beverly Hills, 90210 was created by Darren Star, who served as executive producer and showrunner, and produced by Propaganda Films, 90210 Productions, Torand Productions and Spelling Television. It was released on DVD in 2006 by Paramount Home Entertainment.

== Overview ==
The series follows fraternal twins, Brandon and Brenda Walsh as they move with their parents from Minneapolis, Minnesota to the lavish, and excess filled city of Beverly Hills, California and begin their Junior year at West Beverly Hills High School. At first glance, it seems like their rich classmates have it all, but as time goes on, they learn that not everything is what it seems.

== Cast ==
=== Starring ===
- Jason Priestley as Brandon Walsh
- Shannen Doherty as Brenda Walsh
- Jennie Garth as Kelly Taylor
- Ian Ziering as Steve Sanders
- Gabrielle Carteris as Andrea Zuckerman
- Luke Perry as Dylan McKay
- Brian Austin Green as David Silver
- Douglas Emerson as Scott Scanlon
- Tori Spelling as Donna Martin
- Carol Potter as Cindy Walsh
- James Eckhouse as Jim Walsh

=== Recurring ===
- Joe E. Tata as Nat Bussichio

== Episodes ==
No. overall	No. in season	Title	Directed by	Written by	Original release date	Prod. code	U.S. viewers (millions)
1	1	"Class of Beverly Hills"	Tim Hunter	Darren Star	October 4, 1990	–	11.0
Minnesota natives Brandon and Brenda Walsh begin attending West Beverly Hills High, and experience culture shock when they become exposed to the glamour, wealth, and privilege that their new classmates possess. Following a romantic date, Brandon accidentally spreads a rumor about him sleeping with a notorious party girl. Brenda uses a fake ID to get into a nightclub and passes herself off as a college student when she begins dating a young lawyer. Two freshmen students named David and Scott attempt to navigate their way through the social scene at school. This episode is stretched to two hours in syndication. Pamela Galloway plays Jackie Taylor in the pilot, but Ann Gillespie takes over the role in subsequent episodes.
2	2	"The Green Room"	Michael Uno	David Stenn	October 11, 1990	2190001	10.2
Brandon meets and befriends Dylan McKay, a brooding classmate. As they continue to spend time together, Brandon learns that Dylan's bad-boy act masks a hidden life that few people ever see. The beach is the place to be at for the West Bev students and also where Brenda sees Kelly's true colors. Steve's mother convinces him to talk to David after mistakenly thinking that his father is a wealthy TV show producer. Luke Perry joins the cast as Dylan McKay. James Eckhouse does not appear in this episode.
3	3	"Every Dream Has Its Price (Tag)"	Catlin Adams	Amy Spies	October 18, 1990	2190002	7.8
Brenda goes shopping with Kelly and her wild friend Tiffany and wishes that she had their kind of money. Unbeknownst to her, Tiffany is a shoplifter and when they get arrested, Brenda begins losing her mother's trust. Meanwhile, Brandon gets a job at a trendy restaurant where his boss treats him horribly and pays the minority employees less than minimum wage. Cindy grows uncomfortable when Jim hires a maid. Joe E. Tata first appears as Nat Bussichio, he would later be made a series regular. Douglas Emerson and Tori Spelling do not appear in this episode.
4	4	"The First Time"	Bethany Rooney	Darren Star	October 25, 1990	2190003	7.6
Brandon is excited when Sheryl, his ex-girlfriend from Minneapolis visits. When Sheryl meets Dylan, she becomes aroused by his money and glamour, making Brandon jealous and violent. Brenda develops a crush on her algebra teacher and is disappointed to find out that he has a wife and children that she has agreed to babysit. Cindy worries about Brandon losing his virginity and nags Jim to have the sex talk with him. Ian Ziering and Douglas Emerson do not appear in this episode.
5	5	"One on One"	Artie Mandelberg	Charles Rosin	November 1, 1990	2190004	8.1
When Brandon and Steve try out for the basketball team, Brandon learns that the school recruits minority students from out of the district in order to boost their stats and is forced to make a difficult choice in order to secure a spot on the team and make his father proud. Meanwhile, Brenda decides to take driver’s education again, but fails twice and ends up losing Brandon’s car when trying to pick Kelly up from a bad date. Luke Perry does not appear in this episode.
6	6	"Higher Education"	Artie Mandelberg	Jordan Budde	November 15, 1990	2190005	7.6
An unreasonable history teacher makes his students' lives miserable by using an infamous steep grading curve and when Brandon learns that Steve gets A's by stealing exams before the test, he decides to follow suit. Brenda and Kelly vie for Dylan's attention and when he states that he prefers blondes, Brenda grows insecure and decides to dye her hair but the result is horrifying. Brian Austin Green and Douglas Emerson do not appear in this episode.
7	7	"Perfect Mom"	Bethany Rooney	Darren Star	November 22, 1990	2190006	6.6
Brenda takes her mother for granted when she begins idolizing Kelly's cool mother, but unbeknownst to her, inside the Taylor household lies a dark secret as Jackie relapses and starts abusing drugs and alcohol all the while Kelly's pleas for help go unnoticed. Andrea joins Brenda and Cindy in the 15th Annual West Beverly High Fashion Show. David uses his video camera in order to sneak a peek at Kelly in the fashion show dressing room. Ian Ziering and Luke Perry do not appear in this episode. In this episode only, Donna's mother is named Nancy and portrayed by Jordana Capra. In later shows, her name became Felice and she was played by Katherine Cannon.
8	8	"The 17 Year Itch"	Jefferson Kibbee	Amy Spies	November 29, 1990	2190007	6.2
Following their disappointing seventeenth wedding anniversary, Cindy feels like the intimacy is lost between her and Jim and engages in an emotional affair with her old college boyfriend who has moved to town, scaring Brenda into thinking her parents are headed for divorce. Meanwhile, Brenda and Brandon participate in a UCLA study on twins. Also, David wants to be the new school DJ. Luke Perry does not appear in this episode.
9	9	"The Gentle Art of Listening"	Dan Attias	Charles Rosin	December 6, 1990	2190008	8.0
As the students of West Beverly get pumped for Grudge Week against Beverly Hills High, Brenda grows annoyed by her friends' lack of school spirit. She volunteers for a teen crisis hotline and violates the rules when she takes an after-hours call from a date-rape victim, who is still in danger. Meanwhile, Brandon thinks that a sexy older woman named Nina is attracted to him and makes preparations to have sex with her. Brandon is also followed around school by a lovesick freshman girl to his annoyance. James Eckhouse does not appear in this episode. Michael Woolson later had a recurring role as Erik Budman, Donna and David's boss at MZA.
10	10	"Isn't it Romantic?"	Nancy Malone	Karen Rosin	January 3, 1991	2190009	7.7
Brenda and Dylan start dating, causing differing opinions in the Walsh house. When sex becomes an option, Brenda learns that he may be too intense for her. Dylan's father arrives back to the hotel and criticizes Dylan. Brenda falls for Dylan a lot more when she learns about how bad his estranged relationship with his father is. Dylan finds out his father will be indicted for tax and securities fraud. As a result, Dylan stands up Brenda for a date. Brenda is heartbroken. Meanwhile, the gang begins Sex Education in Health Class and Scott has trouble getting his mother to sign the consent form. Steve attempts to hook up with Stacy Sloan, the class' speaker. Later on, everyone attends an AIDS seminar and listens to Stacy's speech based on her own experience and condition. Terence Ford is the first of three actors to portray Jack McKay.
11	11	"B.Y.O.B."	Miles Watkins	Jordan Budde	January 10, 1991	2190010	9.1
The Walsh twins feel pressured by their peers to drink alcohol. Brandon grows tired of being the responsible twin. When the siblings throw a house party, he goes too far, and puts himself and the lives of others in danger when he drives drunk and gets into a car accident. Meanwhile, after their last drunken hook-up, Kelly grows annoyed by Steve's advances. David does his best to get closer to Kelly. Jim and Cindy go away to Palm Springs for a retreat and are forced to deal with an annoying couple.
12	12	"One Man and a Baby"	Burt Brinckerhoff	Darren Star & Amy Spies	January 24, 1991	2190011	9.9
Brandon gets an unexpected taste of fatherhood when he starts dating a scholarly senior with Ivy League ambition named Melissa and then has to baby-sit her infant son while she has a college interview. Brenda and Kelly win a radio contest and get skydiving lessons. Her parents refuse to allow her to go but she goes anyway. Gabrielle Carteris, Luke Perry, Brian Austin Green, Douglas Emerson and Tori Spelling do not appear in this episode. Kristin Dattilo who plays Melissa was a runner-up for the role of Brenda.
13	13	"Slumber Party"	Charles Braverman	Darren Star	January 31, 1991	2190012	11.0
Brenda invites Kelly, Donna, Andrea and Kelly's rude friend, Amanda, over for a "night of female bonding" but Amanda causes tension within the group when she forces the girls to reveal their deepest secrets. Meanwhile, Brandon and Steve go out and pick up two girls who show their true colors when they steal Steve's car. Also, David and Scott sneak outside the slumber party in order to take lewd pictures of the girls. Luke Perry does not appear in this episode.
14	14	"East Side Story"	Dan Attias	Story by : Carmen Sternwood & Charles Rosin; Teleplay by : Charles Rosin	February 14, 1991	2190013	9.9
The Walshes let Carla, their maid’s niece, use their address so that she can attend West Beverly High. Brandon immediately develops an attraction towards her while wondering what she's hiding. Jim hosts a party for his new client, a sportswear designer. Brandon explodes with anger when he finds Carla waitressing and being used as cheap labor. Also, David tries to get MC Hammer to perform at the school dance. This episode features a special appearance by Debbie Gibson.
15	15	"A Fling in Palm Springs"	Jefferson Kibbee	Jordan Budde	February 21, 1991	2190014	10.3
The students of West Beverly head to Palm Springs for President's Day Weekend. Thinking that his grandparents are on a cruise, David invites Steve, Kelly, and Donna to stay at their house, but David is soon in for a shock when he finds out what is waiting for them. Brenda and Dylan make plans to finally have sex, but Brenda gets lost trying to find Dylan’s hotel and ends up seeing him with another girl. Steve asks Kelly to give their relationship another chance. Back in Beverly Hills, Brandon meets a young boy at the Peach Pit and discovers the reason he hangs around at the restaurant all day. David Gail later had a recurring role as Stuart Carson, Brenda's fiancé.
16	16	"Fame is Where You Find It"	Paul Schneider	Charles Rosin & Karen Rosin	February 28, 1991	2190015	10.0
Brandon accidentally lands a role on a hit TV show and develops a flirtation with the star, Lydia Leeds. Things go great at first, but he soon realizes that showbiz isn't as glamorous as it appears. Meanwhile, Brenda is jealous of Brandon's sudden fame and gets in over her head when she takes over for him at the Peach Pit. Enter Laverne.
17	17	"Stand (Up) and Deliver"	Burt Brinckerhoff	Amy Spies	March 7, 1991	2190016	9.5
Brenda feels out of touch with her surroundings and decides to drop out of school and house-sit for her new and mature friend, Sky. She later finds out the adult world isn't what it's cracked up to be. Meanwhile, Brandon runs for junior class president and enlists Andrea and Kelly's help for his campaign.
18	18	"It's Only a Test"	Charles Braverman	Darren Star	March 28, 1991	2190017	12.8
The West Beverly juniors are panicked by the upcoming SATs, but then everything gets put into perspective when Brenda finds a lump in her breast and faces a test no one can prepare for. Meanwhile, Andrea and Steve decide to study for the upcoming test together, and as the night continues, they end up kissing. Brian Austin Green and Douglas Emerson do not appear in this episode.
19	19	"April is the Cruelest Month"	Dan Attias	Steve Wasserman & Jessica Klein	April 11, 1991	2190018	11.3
Brandon interviews Roger Azarian (Matthew Perry), the school's tennis star, and when he reads his dark and twisted screenplay, Brandon worries that the events in it might come true. Meanwhile, everyone is thrilled by their SAT results except for Donna, who got low SAT scores and begins acting out, unaware that she has a learning disability. Brian Austin Green and Douglas Emerson do not appear in this episode.
20	20	"Spring Training"	Burt Brinckerhoff	Charles Rosin	April 25, 1991	2190019	10.5
When Jim hurts his back, Brandon teams up with Steve to coach his little league baseball team and has trouble disciplining the entitled players. Meanwhile, Brenda develops a bond with a stray dog and makes a desperate plea to convince her family to let her keep him. Douglas Emerson does not appear in this episode.
21	21	"Spring Dance"	Darren Star	Darren Star	May 2, 1991	2190020	12.9
West Beverly prepares for the annual Spring Dance and Kelly, preoccupied with being named Spring Princess and asks Brandon to be her date, which stirs up romantic feelings. Jealous, Steve gets drunk and lashes out at everyone, revealing a deep family secret. Andrea is not going to the dance and is upset when she finds out that Brandon is going with Kelly. Brenda finally loses her virginity to Dylan in their hotel room. David enters a contest to win the first dance with the Spring Princess. Donna has trouble moving in her dress. Andrea shows up at the dance and has a good time. Brandon tells Kelly that he thinks of her as a sister. This episode features a special appearance by The Rave-Ups. In 2009, TV Guide ranked this episode #91 on its list of the 100 Greatest Episodes.
22	22	"Home Again"	Charles Braverman	Amy Spies	May 9, 1991	2190021	15.0
Jim gets a job promotion which means that the Walsh family is moving back to Minneapolis. Saddened by the news, Brandon and Brenda prepare to say goodbye to the friends they've made this past year. Brenda worries that her relationship with Dylan won't survive long distance. Brandon contemplates sleeping with Andrea after she offers herself as a going-away present. The gang throws a going away party for Brandon and Brenda at The Peach Pit. Jim decides not to move his family after all. Douglas Emerson does not appear in this episode. After this episode, he was downgraded to recurring status.

== Reception ==
=== Ratings ===
No. in series	No. in season	Title	Air date	Time slot (ET)	Rating	Share	Viewers (millions)	Ref(s)
1	1	"Class of Beverly Hills"	October 4, 1990	Thursday 9:00 p.m.	7.2	—N/a	—N/a	
2	2	"The Green Room"	October 11, 1990	Thursday 9:00 p.m.	6.3	—N/a	—N/a	
3	3	"Every Dream Has Its Price (Tag)"	October 18, 1990	Thursday 9:00 p.m.	5.2	—N/a	—N/a	
4	4	"The First Time"	October 25, 1990	Thursday 9:00 p.m.	5.4	—N/a	—N/a	
5	5	"One on One"	November 1, 1990	Thursday 9:00 p.m.	5.4	—N/a	—N/a	
6	6	"Higher Education"	November 15, 1990	Thursday 9:00 p.m.	5.1	8	—N/a	
7	7	"Perfect Mom"	November 22, 1990	Thursday 9:00 p.m.	4.1	8	—N/a	
8	8	"The 17 Year Itch"	November 29, 1990	Thursday 9:00 p.m.	4.4	7	—N/a	
9	9	"The Gentle Art of Listening"	December 6, 1990	Thursday 9:00 p.m.	5.2	8	—N/a	
10	10	"Isn't It Romantic?"	January 3, 1991	Thursday 9:00 p.m.	5.1	—N/a	—N/a	
11	11	"B.Y.O.B."	January 10, 1991	Thursday 9:00 p.m.	5.8	—N/a	—N/a	
12	12	"One Man and a Baby"	January 24, 1991	Thursday 9:00 p.m.	6.6	—N/a	—N/a	
13	13	"Slumber Party"	January 31, 1991	Thursday 9:00 p.m.	7.3	—N/a	—N/a	
14	14	"East Side Story"	February 14, 1991	Thursday 9:00 p.m.	6.6	—N/a	—N/a	
15	15	"A Fling in Palm Springs"	February 21, 1991	Thursday 9:00 p.m.	6.8	—N/a	—N/a	
16	16	"Fame Is Where You Find It"	February 28, 1991	Thursday 9:00 p.m.	6.3	—N/a	—N/a	
17	17	"Stand (Up) and Deliver"	March 7, 1991	Thursday 9:00 p.m.	6.7	10	—N/a	
18	18	"It's Only a Test"	March 28, 1991	Thursday 9:00 p.m.	8.0	13	—N/a	
19	19	"April Is the Cruelest Month"	April 11, 1991	Thursday 9:00 p.m.	7.4	12	—N/a	
20	20	"Spring Training"	April 25, 1991	Thursday 9:00 p.m.	7.1	—N/a	—N/a	
21	21	"Spring Dance"	May 2, 1991	Thursday 9:00 p.m.	8.6	—N/a	—N/a	
22	22	"Home Again"	May 9, 1991	Thursday 9:00 p.m.	9.2	15	15.0	

=== Reviews ===
On Metacritic, the first season of Beverly Hills, 90210 scored 46 out of 100, based on nine reviews, indicating "Mixed or average reviews". The season also currently has a 60% rating on Rotten Tomatoes, based on five reviews.
