= Jake Hanson (Beverly Hills, 90210) =

Fictional character in the TV series Melrose Place

- Beverly Hills, 90210 franchise character
- Grant Show as Jake Hanson
- Portrayed by: Grant Show
- Duration: 1992–97
- First appearance: Beverly Hills, 90210: April 30, 1992 (episode 2.27: "Mexican Standoff")
- Last appearance: Melrose Place: May 19, 1997 (episode 5.34: "Who's Afraid of Amanda Woodward?")
- Created by: Darren Star
In-universe information
- Occupation: Carpenter; Motorcycle shop owner Owner of Shooters
- Parents: Vince Conners (father); Stella Rivers (mother; deceased)
- Siblings: Jess Hanson (older brother; deceased)
- Spouse: Alison Parker (ex-wife)
- Children: David Patterson (son, with Colleen); Unborn child (child, with Alison; miscarriage)

Jake Hanson is a fictional character in the American television series Melrose Place, the second series of the Beverly Hills, 90210 franchise. Portrayed by Grant Show, Jake Hanson appeared in the first five seasons of Melrose Place. He also appeared in two episodes of the second season of Beverly Hills, 90210 and the pilot of Models Inc.

== Biography ==
Jake Hanson lived in Ellensburg, Washington before he moved to the Melrose Place apartment complex in Los Angeles. He was considered a bad-boy biker type. He opened his own motorcycle shop with the help of Jo Reynolds. The two had an on-again, off-again romance throughout both characters' time on the series.

Jake had an older brother, Jess; the two men had been estranged for many years when their mother died. The brothers were reunited at their mother's funeral, after which Jess moved from Washington to Los Angeles. He lived with Jake for a while and during this time, he got a job in construction and started dating Jo. However, he became jealous of Jake's life and attempted to take over his brother's bar, Shooters, by hiring men to kill Jake. Jess eventually proposed to Jo, but when she turned him down, he beat her up. Jake found Jo, realized that Jess was her assailant, and left to confront his brother. The two men met up at the construction site where Jess worked and they fought physically, with the result being that they both fell off the building. Jess died in the fall, while Jake was injured but recovered.

Jake had numerous relationships with Melrose Place residents, including most of the female regulars (Sandy, Jo, Amanda, Sydney, Jane, Alison). His bike shop ended up burning down, and later he bought Shooters, which remained as the Melrose gang's hangout.

After dating for a while, Alison and Jake got married and, after a miscarriage, attempted to adopt a child. However, the child services department felt that a father who owned a bar and a mother who was an alcoholic were not the best couple to entrust a child to, and they are denied. Alison, who has no interest in being a mother despite having previously miscarried Jake's child, fools Jake into thinking she has fallen off the wagon so that he reunites with the mother of his long-lost child, and they leave town separately.

Though good-natured, Jake, like most members of the Hanson family, was also shown to have a tough side. He was occasionally prone to getting in physical fights-usually in defense of others. Several moments throughout the series show him successfully standing up for people.

It was revealed during Melrose Place's first season that he had a romantic history with the feisty Sandy Harling, with the two ultimately deciding that they were better off as friends. Following Sandy's departure, Jake was eventually paired with sensitive tough girl Jo Reynolds. He also discovered early on in the series that he had a son named David with ex-girlfriend Colleen Patterson. Both Colleen and David would appear again at later points.

== On Beverly Hills, 90210 ==
Jake was the carpenter hired to help Mel and Jackie for their wedding. He became a love interest for Kelly Taylor, and the two appeared in both Beverly Hills, 90210 and Melrose Place in hopes of linking the two shows together. While their attraction was openly mutual at first, Jake ultimately resisted because Kelly was not yet out of high school.

It is revealed that another Beverly Hills, 90210 character, Dylan McKay, and Jake go way back, with Dylan claiming it was Jake who taught him how to surf and how to pick up girls.

== Love life ==
Jake is known for being a womanizer as he hooked up with nearly every female occupant of Melrose. He had a torrid fling with Amanda Woodward. He had relationships with Sydney Andrews, heroically aiding and defending her, and had subsequent relationships with Jane Mancini and Alison Parker. Jo, however, became the woman he was mostly connected to, though they would eventually remain friends.

== Final appearance ==
After selling Shooters, Jake left the series in the fifth season following a reunion with his ex-girlfriend, Colleen, moving away to live with her and their son. In the new series, it was shown that Michael had a file on him.
