= Jane Mancini =

- Melrose Place character
- Portrayed by: Josie Bissett
- Duration: 1992–99; 2010
- First appearance: Melrose Place: July 8, 1992 (episode 1.01: "Pilot")
- Last appearance: Melrose Place (2009): March 30, 2010 (episode 1.16: "Santa Fe")
- Created by: Darren Star
In-universe information
- Occupation: Fashion Designer; Landlord
- Mother: Sherry Doucette
- Adoptive parents: George Andrews; Katherine Andrews
- Sisters: Sydney Andrews (adoptive)
- Husband: Michael Mancini (1991–93, 1998–99); Kyle McBride
- Children: Miscarried child with Michael; Unnamed daughter with Michael
- Nieces: Violet Foster (adoptive)

Jane Mancini, played by Josie Bissett, is a fictional character from the 1990s prime time soap opera Melrose Place and its 2009 revival.

== Melrose Place ==
When the series starts, she is married to Michael Mancini and works in a clothing boutique on Melrose Ave. In Los Angeles, Jane and Michael serve as the apartment building's superintendents as well as having separate careers. A major plot point for Jane and Michael in the first season is their inability to find time to be together and manage their busy work schedules.

At the end of season one, Jane and Michael's once happy relationship begins to crumble when Michael cheats on Jane with fellow doctor Kimberly Shaw. Jane then divorces Michael. Jane's younger sister Sydney Andrews moves into her apartment and begins to have an affair with Michael behind Jane's back. After Sydney blackmails Michael into marrying her, Jane begins dating Robert Wilson. Jane breaks up with Robert after he sleeps with a prostitute that Michael and Sydney set him up with as part of a deal.

After Robert, Jane starts dating Australian businessman Chris Marchette (Andrew Williams). Chris turns out to be a con artist, and embezzles money from Jane's design business. Chris wants to marry Jane for her money, while also becoming obsessed with Sydney, wanting to use her as his concubine. Michael eventually rescues Jane from Chris after he finds about Chris' true intentions.

Jane eventually becomes business partners with Richard Hart, and later becomes engaged to him. However, Jo Reynolds revealed to Richard that Jane did not truly love him, and Richard begins seeing Jo instead. This causes a rift in Jane and Jo's friendship. Jane then starts dating Jake Hanson, but ends the relationship after Richard rapes and beats her. Planning revenge, Jane teams up with Sydney in conspiring to murder Richard, but it does not go as planned. Richard is then later killed by the police.

Shortly after being robbed at gunpoint several episodes later, Jane leaves Melrose Place and moves back to her hometown of Chicago. She eventually moves back to L.A. for the final season of the show. Jane and Michael rekindle their relationship, and they marry each other for a second time. However, his old ways eventually caused her to leave him again. It is also revealed that she cheated on him the night before her first wedding to him. After divorcing Michael again, she starts a relationship with Kyle. She later finds out that she is pregnant with Michael's baby. Although Kyle knows the baby is not his, he agrees to raise the baby with her. In the series finale, Jane and Kyle are still together, and they find out they are having a girl.

== Melrose Place (2009) ==
Jane reappears in the 2009 follow-up series as the new landlord of the Melrose apartment building. Her character in the follow-up series became a scheming, devious, crafty, and downright amoral and evil person just like all of the other characters. At the aftermath of her sister's death, Jane meets Ella Simms (Katie Cassidy), but actually threatens to show the police incriminating e-mails Ella sent Sydney unless the publicist makes her client wear one of Jane's designs, hoping to make a comeback after her boutique burned down years ago (in an arson fire, which implies, but never fully explains, that Jane may have set the fire to her own boutique to collect a fire insurance payment). Violet Foster (Ashlee Simpson-Wentz) reveals herself as Sydney's illegitimate daughter and Jane seemingly accepts Violet, but she immediately betrays Violet for no clear reason by tipping off the police of Violet's past (stealing money from her foster parents to search for her mother). Jane also goes back on her word to Ella and informs the police of Ella's incriminating e-mails thus getting Ella arrested. Jane briefly returns in episode "Santa Fe" to check up on Amanda to make sure that Ella pays for pulling the red carpet under her. Jane and Michael reunite also with Jo.

== Reception ==
Korbi Ghosh of Zap2it describes Jane as "the first first lady of the series -- and probably the only one who pretty much maintained her sanity from start to finish -- Jane is sweet! And so is the lady who plays her."
