= Amanda Woodward (Melrose Place) =

- Beverly Hills, 90210 franchise character
- Portrayed by: Heather Locklear
- Duration: 1993–99; 2009–10
- First appearance: Melrose Place: January 27, 1993 (episode 1.21: "Picture Imperfect")
- Last appearance: Melrose Place (2009): April 13, 2010 (episode 1.18: "Wilshire")
- Created by: Darren Star
In-universe information
- Occupation: Partner and President of WPK; Former: Owner and President of AWA (Amanda Woodward Advertising); President of D&D Advertising; Stockholder in D&D Advertising; Vice-President of D&D Advertising; Owner of Melrose Place Complex; Art Director of D&D Advertising
- Parents: Palmer Woodward (father); Hillary Michaels (mother)
- Siblings: David Michaels (younger maternal half-brother)
- Spouse: Jack Parezi (1991–95); Peter Burns (1996–97, 1999–?); Kyle McBride (1998, 1998–99); Rory Blake (1998)
- Children: Unnamed child with Billy (miscarriage); Unnamed child with Kyle (miscarriage)

Amanda Woodward is a fictional character on the primetime serial drama Melrose Place, portrayed by Heather Locklear. The character was brought onto the show in order to boost its ratings, a ploy that was successful. Amanda was brought back for The CW's 2009 reboot, but her appearance was not enough to prevent the show's cancellation.

Entertainment Weekly named Amanda one of the 100 Greatest Characters of the Last 20 Years. AOL ranked her the 37th Most Memorable Female TV Character. She was also included in TV Guide's list of the "best TV bitches", and their 2013 list of The 60 Nastiest Villains of All Time. In 2016, Rolling Stone ranked her #20 of their "40 Greatest TV Villains of All Time".

== Background ==
Amanda Woodward is the daughter of Palmer Woodward and Hillary Michaels. She also has a half-brother, David Michaels. She had an unhappy childhood - her parents were abusive and neglectful, and growing up Amanda developed a "hard shell" and learned how to manipulate people so they could not hurt her. However, she retains a pleasant and compassionate side, which figures prominently into her character development.

It was also revealed that Amanda's father, Palmer Woodward, was a petty criminal who was often absent from his daughter's life when she was a child. He was eventually murdered, and Amanda had to identify her father's body. Amanda graduated from The California Institute of the Arts before working at D&D.

== Character arc ==
=== Melrose Place ===
Amanda Woodward was introduced as an advertising executive at D&D, who eventually became the direct superior of Alison Parker. Though the women at first got along, their relationship became strained after Amanda started dating Alison's roommate Billy—a development which brought Alison a sense of awkwardness. The ill feelings eventually began to reveal a more malicious side to Amanda's personality, which crossed over into the workplace. Billy was gradually drawn away from Amanda, and later began seeing Alison. Though Amanda was soon back on good terms with the couple, she then stunned them with her announcement that she was buying their apartment complex and moving in.

When Amanda's tenant, Jo Reynolds, faced charges for killing a criminal ex-boyfriend in retaliation for a rape, Amanda surprised everyone by supporting her in court. Amanda later tried to do the right thing when her estranged mother, Hillary Michaels, showed up with a worthless younger fiancé named Chaz who tried to force himself on Amanda; however, Hillary accused Amanda of lying and prepared to take over D&D so that she could dismiss Amanda from her job and install Chaz in her place. Amanda later spoke to Chaz, who smugly told her that her career was over, but (unbeknownst to him) was also overheard by Hillary when he said Hillary was too old for him and he planned to leave her once he had the job and money to attract younger women. Hillary then switched to her daughter's side, broke up with Chaz and exposed him as a fraud. Amanda was appreciative, but bluntly told her mom that there was no chance they could have a close relationship in the future; Hillary sadly accepted this, and they parted on respectful terms.

Amanda's criminal and abusive husband, Jack Parezi, eventually discovered that she had faked her death to escape him. During their reunion, he was greeted by a braver, more hardened woman than the one he'd abused, and bided his time before making a serious move. After Jack finally attempted to force himself upon her, Amanda managed to fight him off before running. While chasing her, Jack tripped and fell from a balcony. He later died, prompting his father to send Jack's brother Bobby on a mission of revenge. Bobby instead developed feelings for Amanda and refused to do her any harm, which ultimately led her to be free of the family.

Amanda was involved with nearly every straight male main character on the show, with the exceptions of Ryan McBride and Brett Cooper. This began with the post-Parezi relationship with Billy Campbell, which ended in tragedy when she miscarried their baby. Later she got together with Jake Hanson, which also ended in tragedy when her father was blown up on The Pretty Lady. She moved on with Dr. Peter Burns until Dr. Michael Mancini saved her from his murderous plot and later Hodgkin's disease, which resulted in a quick but dishonest relationship between the two of them. A quick return to old flame Bobby Parezi ended when Peter tried to win her back, and Bobby ended up dead due to Peter's plot. She later married Peter but left him when he had an affair with Taylor McBride, and she ended up with Taylor's ex-husband Kyle McBride after a brief fling with Craig Field. The two eventually got married until misunderstandings caused a divorce, leading her to marry Rory Blake. When Rory tried to kill her for her money, he was accidentally stabbed to death while fighting with Kyle leading her to remarry Kyle and the two decided to have a baby. While trying for a baby, Kyle is informed that he is sterile. Amanda then finds out that she is pregnant, and Kyle assumes that she cheated on him, since he believes he is sterile. He pushes her off a balcony, causing her to miscarry, but he afterwards finds out that Amanda was faithful to him, and he is not sterile. Peter had Amanda kidnapped later in an attempt to win her back, but it did not work. Unfortunately for both Kyle and Amanda, further misunderstandings (including hospital mix-ups) and Kyle's problems with drugs and alcohol drove her back into Peter's arms. After becoming rich, the two faked their deaths via explosion in order to avoid prison time. They were assisted in the cover-up by their friend Michael, who they paid one million dollars before disappearing. The series concluded with Peter and Amanda eloping on a secluded island and walking off together on a beach.

=== Melrose Place (2009) ===
Locklear returned as Amanda in the show's tenth episode, "Cahuenga." As with the original series, she was billed as a "Special Guest Star." In the show's final episode, "Wilshire," she is arrested for her involvement in an art theft that was partially responsible for the murder of Sydney Andrews, but the final scene was shot in anticipation of the show's renewal, which did not happen.

During her time on the second generation of Melrose Place, Amanda said in episode 11 that she got bored with Peter, the sun, and the sand. As she is a city girl and she needed to be in the center of the action, she came back for this reason. No mention was made as to what happened to her fugitive ex-husband, Dr. Peter Burns.
