= Brenda Walsh (Beverly Hills, 90210) =

- Beverly Hills, 90210 franchise character
- Brenda Walsh in the series premiere "Class of Beverly Hills"
- Portrayed by: Shannen Doherty
- Duration: 1990–1994; 2008–09; 2019
- First appearance: "Class of Beverly Hills" (1990; Beverly Hills, 90210)
- Last appearance: "One Party Can Ruin Your Whole Summer" (2009; 90210)
- Created by: Darren Star
In-universe information
- Parents: Jim Walsh (father); Cindy Walsh (mother)
- Siblings: Brandon Walsh (twin brother)
- Children: Unnamed daughter

Brenda Walsh, portrayed by Shannen Doherty, is a fictional character who was the female lead of Beverly Hills, 90210 for the first four seasons.

== Conception ==
Brenda and her twin brother, Brandon Walsh, were living in Minnesota until their father, Jim Walsh, was promoted and moved to a job in Beverly Hills in 1990. The series initially focuses on their stories and the cultural shock of living on the West coast, and their relationship with their new friends, Kelly Taylor, Dylan McKay, Donna Martin, Andrea Zuckerman, David Silver and Steve Sanders.

== Season 1 ==
The early development of Brenda Walsh was focused on her feelings about moving to a new town, making new friends, and trying to fit in to the new Beverly Hills lifestyle. In the pilot episode, Brenda fantasizes about making big changes in her life, alluding to the idea that she was not very popular at her old school. She meets Kelly Taylor and struggles internally with impressing her and the other kids at school. Her desperation to fit in and be counted among the popular is highlighted by her sudden rule breaking and sneaking around. She gets a fake ID and gets entry to a club, where she meets a man named Jason, a lawyer in his early 20s. Brenda lies to him and pretends to be a college student, embarking on a relationship that proves to be moving too fast for her.

An example of Brenda's naivete and idealistic attitude was when she disclosed her real age to Jason, thinking that he would continue dating her, in spite of the fact that she was a 16-year-old high school student. We see Brenda's youthful heartbreak and the realization that love does not conquer all as Jason angrily declines. It is in that moment that the audience is most drawn to Brenda, as the direction for the character led us to think that an honor roll student with the loving family and good looks had it all together and lived a perfect and grown up life, even while still in high school. Her vulnerability at this point brought a touch of reality to the character that fans appreciated and helped move the season into the second episode with a larger fan base. Brenda further displays her desire for popularity with her hot and cold relationship with Andrea Zuckerman, the nerdy editor of the West Beverly High newspaper. When in front of her friends, Brenda pretends to dislike Andrea, subtly mocking her. However, in episodes where Brenda and Andrea are alone together, Brenda treats her with a grudging respect, but they would become good friends later on. This behavior is repeated with other, less popular students as well, shining a light on the magnitude of a teenager's desire to fit in and be popular. Brenda is no exception to this common theme.

In season one, the primary character arc for Brenda Walsh came during a series of episodes involving a surprise romance with Brandon's solitary friend, Dylan McKay, who had long been misunderstood as an outsider and bad boy. Brenda and Dylan's relationship quickly became serious in season one, after an angry dispute with his father on one of their first dates. Brenda consoled Dylan, and the two shared a passionate kiss. This scene jump-started one of the most talked about pairings at West Beverly High. Brenda's father was initially against the relationship, due to the bad reputation of Dylan's father, however, Brenda continued to date Dylan in secret.

After two months of dating, Dylan wanted to have sex, but Brenda was not ready. During a trip to Palm Springs, Brenda went to meet Dylan in a hotel room but saw him with another girl and jumped to the conclusion that they had shared an intimate relationship. Showing her temper, Brenda stormed off but returned shortly thereafter, only to throw the girl out of the hotel room and confront Dylan. Brenda and Dylan quickly reconciled but not before an uncomfortable argument that ended with Brenda essentially demanding that Dylan sleep with her, since that was all he was apparently concerned about. As a result, Dylan agreed to wait until Brenda was ready, and the couple left the hotel and went to spend the rest of the holiday with their friends at David Silver's grandparent's house in Palm Springs.

Despite the show's focus on the relationship between Brenda and Dylan, her character was developed in other areas as well, forming an identity separate from simply being "Dylan's girlfriend". In multiple episodes, Brenda proves herself to be a funny, smart, and driven young woman who cares about her friends and family and puts them first, along with her own personal goals. The character definitely has a streak of pride that shows that she is not perfect and makes plenty of mistakes, but to keep the character relatable, the directors and writers included Brenda's vulnerable side. Episodes such as, "It's Only a Test" show an uncertain girl who is learning about life and the struggles that take place. However, episodes such as "The Perfect Mom" also reveal the important impact both friends and a supportive family play in Brenda's life. Brenda's other relationships aside, the significant one she has with Dylan are prioritized in every episode, and she verbalizes this in the episode "Sleepover", when she communicates to her friend, Kelly, that she does not want her relationship with a boy to jeopardize their friendship.

At the West Beverly High spring dance, Brenda and Dylan make the decision to have sex for the first time. As their relationship is taken to a new level, Brenda has to deal with the news that her family will be moving back to Minneapolis for her father's promotion in the season finale, "Home Again". It seems as though all the friends that she made will be left behind, and many tears are shed, as Brenda says her goodbye to her friends and ends her relationship with Dylan, fearing that long distance dating will cause Dylan to cheat while she is away. The culmination of the season comes when Brenda's father decides to stay in Beverly Hills for the sake of his family's happiness, and Brenda informs Dylan that she is "late".

== Season 2 ==
Season two begins with the pregnancy scare between Brenda and Dylan. Brenda has to tell her parents about the situation, when her mom finds the pregnancy test, and after struggling with the responsibilities that come with a sexual relationship, Brenda decides to end the relationship with Dylan. Brenda withdraws back to her close inner circle of friends to reclaim her identity as an individual and begins pursuing an acting class during the summer. She keeps her distance from Dylan, not trusting her ability to end their romance for good, but after he suffers a surfing injury and has to stay at the Walsh residence to recover, the two rekindle their relationship. The situation causes a struggle between Brenda and her father, as he continues to see Brenda as a little girl, even as she becomes a young woman. Rather than trying to find her place in her new social circle like she did in season one, in season two we see that Brenda is becoming her own person and claiming her space as an adult in the Walsh family circle.

Dylan decides to move to Hawaii to live with his mother, and Brenda continues finding herself at home in Beverly Hills. They talk infrequently, and Brenda still struggles with whether she wants to end the relationship for good, and when Dylan returns from Hawaii, they continue to see each other without the sexual aspect of the relationship.

The second season of the series introduces new characters and begins to focus more on Brenda's twin brother, Brandon, further developing his character in the storyline. Brenda's character seems to develop on the sidelines, while she and Dylan navigate their relationship, but she is not disregarded in the plot. In side stories throughout season two, Brenda continues to shed the naivety that defined her character in season one, and towards the end of the season, she makes decisions that do not align with what her parents want. During a fateful weekend, Brenda and Dylan abscond to Baja, Mexico, and afterward, Mr. Walsh decides to keep them from seeing each other at all. The season finale ends with a fight between Dylan and Mr. Walsh.

== Season 3 ==
Season three begins during the summer before Brenda's senior year of high school. After the fight between Dylan and Mr. Walsh, Brenda was forbidden from seeing Dylan, but she continues to do so in secret. When her parents find out that she has been lying to them, Brenda stands up to them and demands to have her feelings for Dylan taken seriously. She goes so far as to pack up her clothes after the fight and leave home to be with Dylan at his house. She is distraught, but is frustrated that she has been forced to hide the most important relationship in her life from her family. The cohabitation is more stressful than Brenda realized before moving in, and before long she and Dylan are fighting about everything.

In an effort to cool things off, Brenda decides to go to Paris for a French immersion program in lieu of Kelly, who has taken her responsibility as a big sister very seriously and decided to stay home. Mr. Walsh and Dylan both support Brenda's summer trip to France; Mr. Walsh, as a way to get Brenda away from Dylan, and Dylan as a way to get Brenda's father off his back. In Paris, Brenda focuses on exploring the sites and soaking up the French culture, deciding to hold off from calling Dylan so she does not get distracted. She wants to evolve as a person, and not be directed by the men in her life; her father or Dylan.

In Beverly Hills, Dylan and Kelly's friendship gets closer while Brenda is studying overseas. Brenda pretends to be a French native when she meets a young man named Rick, and their relationship becomes romantic. When Brenda returns home and leaves Rick behind in Paris, her relationship with Dylan gets back to normal, but even though she tells Dylan about Rick, he does not tell her about Kelly. When Rick suddenly shows up in Beverly Hills and runs into Brenda, Dylan discloses to Brenda that there was a girl over the summer, but does not tell her that it was her best friend. After a dramatic break up, Brenda starts to see Rick, and Dylan immediately goes to Kelly's. As the season three directors develop the other characters' storylines, the plot surrounding Brenda, Kelly, and Dylan seems to be a natural progression for the series. The love triangle that followed Brenda's return from France quickly became a milestone in the series that helped increase her popularity and gave rise to the rumors of an off-set rivalry announced between Shannen Doherty and Jennie Garth. The final confrontation between Brenda, Dylan and Kelly – in which he informs Brenda about the affair and that he has chosen her best friend – was listed by Entertainment Weekly at #61 as one of the greatest moments of television of the 1990s. As the tension between the three continues, Brenda considers leaving Beverly Hills behind and applies to a Minnesota college. She feels abandoned by her friends as they are all more consumed with their respective romantic relationships and she is single and pining for her lost love with Dylan.

The love triangle between Brenda, Kelly and Dylan became a milestone in the series. The final confrontation between the three (Brenda pictured), in which Kelly and Dylan reveal their affair while Brenda was in Paris and that he has chosen Kelly, was listed by Entertainment Weekly as one of the greatest moments of television.

After several months, Brenda moves past her disappointment that Dylan had moved on with Kelly, and as the group starts making plans for after graduation, Brenda makes her decision to attend college in Minnesota, leaving her friends in Beverly Hills behind.

== Season 4 ==
Brenda began the fourth season in Minnesota, where she had decided to enter university. She chose to go to university in Minnesota to prove that she could make it on her own, away from her family and out from underneath Brandon's shadow and more so, to distract herself from the painful feelings she experienced after Dylan chose to be with her best friend Kelly instead of her. However, after realizing that she and her old friends from Minnesota have little in common anymore and deciding to take control of her own destiny regardless of her geographical location, she decides to return to her family in Beverly Hills. This is another big step for Brenda's character, as it is the turning point where she stops running from her mistakes and the heartbreak of her past, faces reality, and takes responsibility for creating the life she wants for herself.

The Walsh parents struggled to understand the reasons behind Brenda's dropping out of Minnesota University's program and moving home. However, they were more concerned that Brenda chose not to attend a university in California either and stated that her failure to succeed in Minnesota was proof that she is not cut out for higher education at all. Despite the character's desire to be the master of her own destiny, Brenda continues to teeter between making rational and irrational decisions, and struggles with the "all or nothing" mentality that plagues most young adolescents, ironically narrowing their opportunities at the very time they are trying to spread their wings and join the world as adults.

While settling back into being home in Beverly Hills, Brenda spends the first few days of her return hanging out at the Peach Pit and cruising around town with Dylan, as he has decided not to enter university either. But after some heart to heart discussion, both Brenda and Dylan decide to give California University a chance, and they both enroll.

Brenda participates in rush week with her friends Kelly, Donna, and Andrea upon arriving at the university. The friends hope that by pledging the same sorority, they will be able to maintain their close friendships during their college years. Despite wanting to maintain close friendships, Brenda is not impressed with the non-stop party scene that pervades the sorority life. After putting her energy towards finding a job instead of pledging, and not having any luck, Brenda decides to work for her dad for some real job experience.

The job experience was going well, but Brenda was frustrated that between school, work and homework, she would never find time to date. Brenda's parents set her up on a blind date with the son of one of Mr. Walsh's clients, and while she was hesitant at first to go, she and her date, Stuart, became serious very quickly, announcing their marriage engagement at the Walsh's 20th wedding anniversary only two weeks after they first met. The Walsh's did not forbid the marriage at first, but had their concerns that Brenda was being rash, as she tends to do. Brandon had serious concerns though, after Dylan told him that he had known Stuart years ago as a dealer of drugs. Once Dylan spoke to Mr. Walsh about his concerns, Mr. Walsh encouraged Dylan to convince Brenda not to marry Stuart, implying that Brenda still loved him. Because Kelly and Dylan had broken up at this point, he actually considered the possibility of getting back together with Brenda, now with Mr. Walsh's blessing.

Even though Brenda and Stuart have a whirlwind romance, when she finds out that Stuart has a prenuptial agreement for her to sign prior to marrying him, Brenda gets upset and storms out.

She and Dylan have coffee after running into each other at a poetry reading, and Dylan begs Brenda to end the engagement, telling her that her marriage would end any chance that they might get back together. Brenda quickly surmises that he has spoken to her father, and is furious that her family and friends would go behind her back and try to manipulate her. After confronting her father about his part in it, she packs her things and leaves to move in with Stuart at his condo. Hoping to team up with Stuart's parents and discourage their children from marrying so soon, the Walsh's invite them over for lunch, but are surprised to learn that Stuart's parents not only support the marriage plans, but have already started planning the wedding with event coordinators. Brenda and Stuart become overwhelmed and decide to elope to Las Vegas in secret, but Brenda spills the beans to Brandon and he tells their friends. Everyone books plane tickets and flies to Vegas in an effort to stop her, but knowing how hard headed she is, they decide to persuade her using reverse psychology and pretend that they are in favor of the marriage. Brenda starts to doubt her reasons for marrying Stuart and calls off the wedding.

Brenda's life also took a few shots during the season. When Donna and Brenda find a puppy on the street, they learn that he escaped from an animal testing laboratory and are helpless when the puppy dies. Brenda then falls into a group of animal rights activists and participates with them in the ransacking of a number of laboratories until she is arrested (Donna decides at the last minute not to join the group). After her arrest, Dylan is the only person in the group who supported her; David Silver questioned her judgment, Andrea was angry that she had damaged laboratories that did not test animals, and Kelly told her that Dylan was no longer her boyfriend and that Brenda could not go and look for help whenever she had a problem. It turned out that one of the activists was an FBI agent who offered Brenda a deal to keep her out of jail because she had not supported vandalism.

As a result, all Brenda's friends apologized for their behavior towards her. During the fourth season, Brenda is interested in the drama department but it also led to problems: she spoiled her first audition and then went to the director of the play to try again and convince him. She then got the role, but a student started a rumor saying that Brenda had slept with the director to get the role. Unfortunately, this student was Steve Sanders' girlfriend, and Steve believed the rumors; the others refused, more or less, to believe Brenda when she denied the rumors. Steve understood his mistake when the student asked him to attack Brenda to make her miss rehearsals. A little later, Steve's friend tried to commit suicide, but Brenda and Steve joined forces to save her and Steve was finally compensated by following Brenda's debut on stage. The director's praise led her to accept the latter at the Royal Academy of Dramatic Arts (RADA) in London for a year. After Kelly and Dylan last broke up, Brenda finally learned that a relationship was possible between Kelly and Brandon and expressed her blessing. She later spent her last night with Dylan, telling him she would not be gone forever. The couple will reconcile briefly in the final scene of the fourth season, though (because of Shannen Doherty's departure) Brenda's character was removed from the script and she never returned to Beverly Hills.

== Conflicts with Beverly Hills, 90210 staff ==
Shannen Doherty was notorious for being late and being in conflict with staff. Tiffani-Amber Thiessen replaced Brenda Walsh as a character called Valerie Malone.

== After the departure ==
While Doherty never made a return appearance to the original series after Season 4, she was often mentioned by other characters and sometimes used in absentia as a plot device for storylines. In Season 5, characters enjoyed taking cheap shots at her (Brandon referring to her mercurial nature, Dylan stating that Valerie was smarter than Brenda, etc.), but the most significant offscreen deployment of Brenda was her reconciliation with Dylan. The Season 6 finale made it clear they were living together in London because Dylan's birthday message to Steve came from the same UK address Brandon had for Brenda, and in Season 7 Valerie used this to fabricate a trip by Dylan to Los Angeles so she could try and ruin Kelly's planned reconciliation with Brandon (it did not work). Brenda and Dylan were still together in season 8, where it is learned that Dylan's half-sister was saved from a life of prostitution and then left to live with Dylan and Brenda in London and Kelly and Brandon mentioned going to visit them for part of their honeymoon. Dylan's return as a series regular in Season 9 had him confirming to Kelly that he and Brenda had broken up a few years ago, which does not totally fit into the S8 story reference but did write her out of the show's narrative for good.

In Season 5, Dylan rages against Valerie, the Walsh family friend, blaming her for wanting to imitate Brenda and not having the guts to confront the Walsh parents, as Brenda was able to do before. She will also send an announcement to Dylan at the latter's wedding. Or, in the last episode of the series illustrating the marriage of Donna and David, it is alluded to a slumber party that Brenda had organized when they were still in high school.

== 90210 ==
Fourteen years after her departure, Brenda is back in Beverly Hills. On the advice of Kelly to the new counselor, Brenda becomes an actress and is led to direct the musical of the high school. She will have to deal with the drug problems of the high school girl who plays the lead role in the show and will help her get out of it, which will follow a mutual attachment of the latter. She will also spend a lot of time with Kelly although at times, they will recover some tensions due among others to Dylan. Kelly also learns later that Brenda has slept with Ryan, the high school English teacher, while Kelly has a lot of affection for him. But they will always be reconciled. We also learn that Brenda cannot have children, who can count on the support of her friend Kelly. She goes to China and adopt a little girl.

== BH90210 ==
Shannen Doherty returned to the 90210 family with her joining the cast of the new reboot BH90210. She, like the rest of the cast, is playing a heightened version of herself.

== Reception ==
The character of Brenda Walsh had a mixed reception from fans and critics. Most of the criticism for the fictional character was the result of Brenda's shift from a nice girl to that of a bad girl, which was very unpopular with both viewers and critics. UGO Networks writer, K. Thor Jensen, cited her as one of the "Meanest TV Girls", and Entertainment Weekly included her in their list of the "21 Top TV Bitches". Following Shannen Doherty's passing, a number of articles came out in retrospect to the character of Brenda, praising her evolution or overall character, including Vogue, Glamour, Slate among many more. Fiorella Valdesolo in her article about in the character for Vogue stated that she was team Brenda. Willa Paskin for Slate praised the performance Doherty brought to the part saying "A girl next door; a beacon of innocence; a plausible Midwesterner: That’s not what Doherty brought to the part. She didn’t have the niceness, the veneer of congeniality, the “Make polite small talk at the checkout line” politesse. No, she wanted in—in with the in crowd, into the bathing suit, into this new, more worldly life. And she wanted in so badly that she was never going to be Californian either." Perrie Samotin for Glamour also praised the Shannen Doherty's performance stating "In every scene she was in, she played Brenda with the gale force of a midwestern winter and took what could have been a generic fish-out-of-water character to transcendent heights, seamlessly going from moon-face cutie in stretch headbands to sculpted beauty who didn’t take shit from anybody." The New York Times praised the character for redefining the teen drama genre, and giving a voice to teenage girls.
