= Michael Mancini =

- Melrose Place character
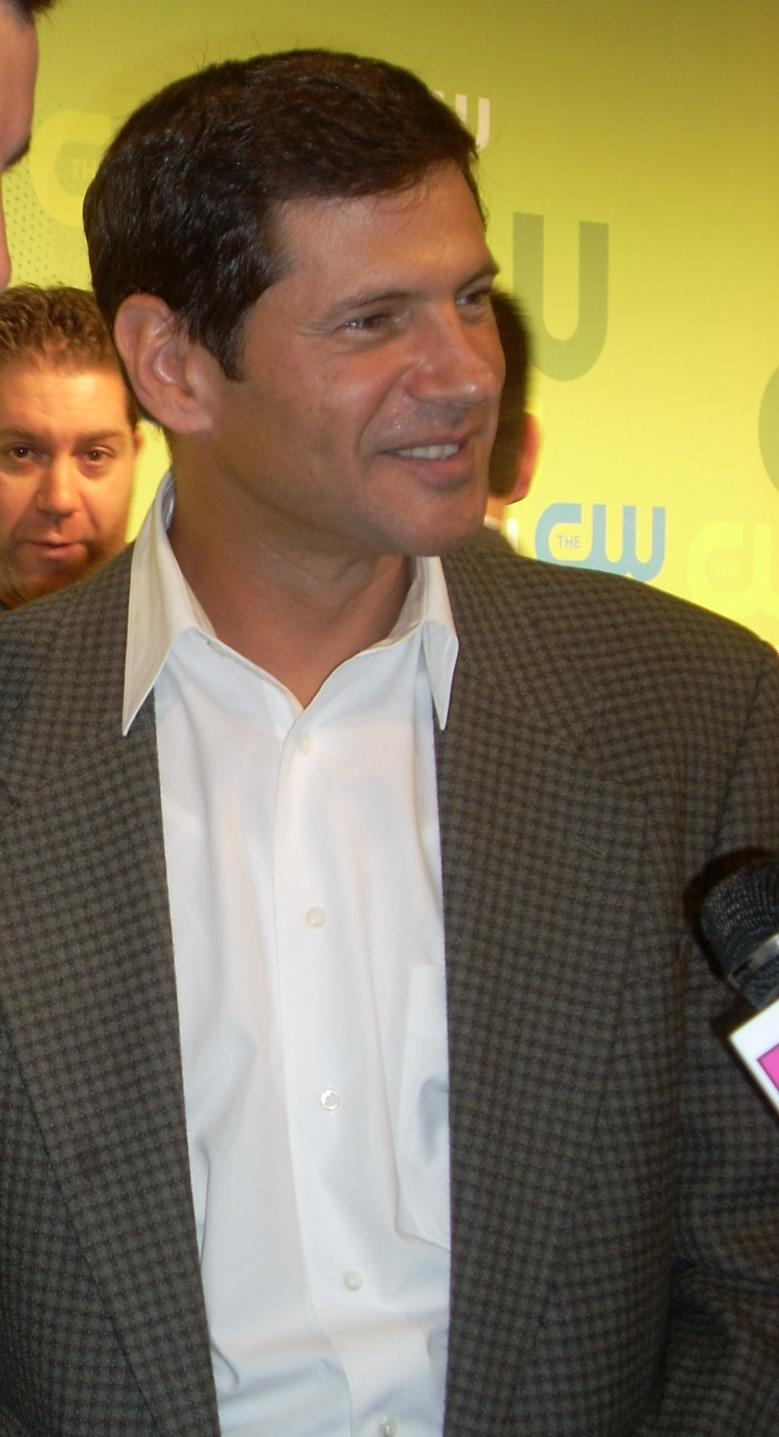
- Thomas Calabro (pictured in 2008) portrayed Michael Mancini
- Portrayed by: Thomas Calabro
- Duration: 1992–99; 2009–10
- First appearance: Melrose Place: July 8, 1992 (episode 1.01: "Pilot")
- Last appearance: Melrose Place (2009): April 13, 2010 (episode 1.18: "Wilshire")
- Created by: Darren Star
In-universe information
- Occupation: Doctor; Manager of apartment building in first season.
- Mother: Mia Mancini
- Sisters: Jennifer Mancini
- Wife: Jane Andrews (1991–93, 1998–99); Sydney Andrews (1994); Kimberly Shaw (1994–97); Megan Lewis (1997); Vanessa Mancini (200?–10)
- Children: David Breck; Mikey Davis; Unnamed daughter Noah Mancini (legal)
- Grandchildren: Noah Mancini

Michael Mancini, M.D., portrayed by Thomas Calabro, is a fictional character from the 1990s prime time drama Melrose Place and the 2009 series revival of the same name.

Presented originally as an honest and devoted husband with a career driven mind-set, Michael became a very different character over the course of the series, turning into a notorious womanizer and schemer.

Michael Mancini is notable for being the only character who was present for the original show's entire run.

== Storylines ==
=== Melrose Place ===
During the first season, Michael begins as a very dedicated husband to Jane, and the show chronicles their troubles as a couple. Towards the end of the first season, Michael has an affair with colleague, Kimberly Shaw, causing Jane to file for divorce and kick him out of their apartment.

Michael then moves into a beach house with Kimberly, but yet again has an affair with his ex-sister-in-law Sydney Andrews, Jane's younger sister. Kimberly breaks up with Michael but they briefly get back together when he asks her to marry him. She happily agrees but their bliss is very short since they get into a serious car accident. Michael is injured badly, but Kimberly is left comatose and is taken back home by her mother, who later claims that Kimberly later died of her injuries. Meanwhile, Sydney blackmails Michael into marrying her and their marriage is mostly one sided. When Kimberly shows up alive at the end of season two, he goes back to her and divorces Sydney. He later marries Kimberly in season three.

Michael's marriage to Kimberly ends when he cheats on her with Amanda Woodward, causing Kimberly to have a mental breakdown. After Kimberly blows up the apartment complex, he gets back together with Sydney. While he was dating Sydney again, he tried to have an affair with his ex-wife, Jane, whom Sydney secretly drugs. After finding out Sydney drugged Jane, he breaks up with her, and gets back together with Kimberly. Kimberly and Michael later renew their vows.

After Kimberly falls ill from a brain aneurysm, she hires a prostitute named Megan to have an affair with Michael so he can enjoy sex. However, things turn sour when Michael and Megan's relationship becomes more than just sexual. Michael and Kimberly then divorce for good, and he marries Megan in Las Vegas.

In season seven, Michael begins a relationship with Lexi Sterling who breaks up with him after his marriage proposal.

=== Melrose Place (2009) ===
In the spin-off/revival of the show, Michael is shown to have married a woman named Vanessa, and has a son named David Breck (played by Shaun Sipos), one of the main characters. He is still a very unfaithful man, cheating on his wife with both Sydney (prior to her death) and her daughter, Violet Foster.
