= Dylan McKay =

Fictional character in Beverley Hills, 90210

- Beverly Hills, 90210 character
- Portrayed by: Luke Perry
- First appearance: 1st Run: October 11, 1990 (Beverly Hills, 90210, "The Green Room"); 2nd Run: November 18, 1998 (Beverly Hills, 90210, "You Say Goodbye, I Say Hello")
- Last appearance: 1st Run: November 8, 1995 (Beverly Hills, 90210, "One Wedding and a Funeral"); 2nd Run: May 17, 2000 (Beverly Hills, 90210, "Ode to Joy")
- Created by: Darren Star
In-universe information
- Occupation: "Peach Pit After Dark" owner
- Family: Jack McKay (father); Iris McKay (mother); Erica McKay (half-sister); Jack Waitkus (half-brother)
- Spouse: Antonia Marchette (1995, deceased)

Dylan Michael McKay, played by Luke Perry, is a fictional character from the television series, Beverly Hills, 90210.

== Beverly Hills, 90210 ==
=== Early years ===
The son of morally ambiguous business tycoon Jack McKay and his hippie ex-wife, Iris McKay, Dylan starts the series with a reputation for being a dangerous loner. After he stands up to some bullies for a freshman student, Scott Scanlon, he is befriended by Brandon Walsh, and through Brandon, he becomes friends with Donna Martin, Kelly Taylor, Steve Sanders, Brenda Walsh, Andrea Zuckerman, and David Silver. Dylan grows close to all of them, and they help soften his rebel attitude. Dylan eventually starts dating Brenda, and despite her father's (Jim Walsh) protests, the two soon fall in love.

Throughout the first two seasons, Dylan's relationship with Brenda helps him through several traumatic events, including his struggle with alcoholism and his father's arrest (and eventual conviction) for several white-collar crimes. However, when Dylan takes Brenda to Mexico against her father's wishes, her father forbids her to date him. Brenda refuses to obey and moves in with Dylan, who becomes increasingly unhappy in the relationship. Due to his feud with Jim Walsh and their new living arrangement, Dylan is annoyed to the point that he nearly ends their relationship. At this point, Jim proposes to send Brenda to France (in lieu of Kelly Taylor) for a summer French immersion program.

With Brenda in Paris, Dylan starts spending a great deal of time with Kelly, helping her babysit her little sister and entering a doubles beach volleyball tournament with her. The two have a strictly physical affair, but Kelly ends it out of loyalty to Brenda. Upon Brenda's return from Paris, she and Dylan reunite. This doesn't last long though, as Brenda (who also had an affair) runs into the man she was seeing in Paris at a video store and starts seeing him behind Dylan's back. Dylan and Brenda break up, and Dylan heads straight for Kelly. This doesn't last long either, however. After Brenda sees them on a date and gets angry at them, they take a step back from their potential relationship. Dylan, confused about his relationships with both women, takes a road trip to get away from them. When he returns, Kelly and Brenda tell him to make a choice. When Brenda is unable to show up when he invites both girls to see his father, he decides to choose Kelly.

When Dylan's father is prematurely released from prison, Kelly helps Dylan re-establish a healthy relationship with his father. However, this does not last long; Jack is apparently killed by a car-bomb planted by the mob because he could not pay a debt. Dylan spends the remainder of the third season managing his relationship with Kelly and with the rest of his friends, graduates from West Beverly High School in the season finale.

=== Seasons 4–6 ===
In the fourth season of the show, Dylan meets a woman who calls herself Suzanne Steele and who claims to be the mother of Jack McKay's illegitimate child, a young girl named Erica (Noley Thornton, then Johna Stewart-Bowden in season 8). Dylan is initially skeptical, but eventually accepts them as family. This, coupled with Dylan's close friendship with Brenda, strains his relationship with Kelly. They repeatedly break up and get back together, but they ultimately call it quits after a particularly bad fight. Dylan briefly reconciles with Brenda before she leaves for London.

After Suzanne begins dating environmental chemist Kevin Weaver, whom she soon marries, Dylan agrees to help fund Suzanne's new husband's personal project promoting clean beaches, a cause about which Dylan is also passionate). It is revealed to the audience (but not to Dylan or any other character in the show) in the season finale that Suzanne and Kevin were conning him, and using his cause (and longing for family) to steal his large trust fund.

The show's fifth season is set several months later. Dylan, nearly bankrupt because of the events of the previous season, has suffered a relapse and spent the summer in Mexico, mulling over issues with Brenda, Kelly and the betrayal of his "family". Feeling alienated from friends, family, and life in general, Dylan keeps his financial situation a secret from everyone. After Dylan returns to Beverly Hills, he finds out that Brandon and Kelly have started dating and makes a scene at Donna's Cotillion rehearsal dinner. He mocks Kelly, who in her anger tells him that "we are so over".

Dylan then starts taking drugs and sleeping with Valerie Malone, who discovers his drug problem and his true financial situation and tells the rest of Dylan's friends. Dylan continues in his downward spiral until his friends hold an intervention. He agrees to go to rehab, but checks out after only one day. He then loads up on drugs and gets into a life-threatening car wreck, where (while fighting for his life) he has a series of dreams about his innocent half-sister Erica, and realizes that he must clean himself up in order to save her from her mother Suzanne and from Suzanne's partner-in-crime Kevin. Afterwards, Dylan checks back into rehab and is successful in regaining his sobriety. After he is released from rehab with most of his confidence and self-esteem back, he redoubles his efforts to track down Erica and her mother and stepfather. With an investigator named "Jonesy" (and with Valerie's help), they track down Kevin and Suzanne, who are hiding out in Mexico, and after a caper, recover Erica and all of Dylan's money.

A short time after, he starts hypnotherapy in order to research a role for a screenwriter friend's (who was also in rehab) next movie. Through hypnotherapy, he discovers a past life in which he believes reveals Kelly to be his soulmate. Despite Kelly's ongoing relationship with Brandon, Dylan then confesses his continued love for her. He offers her a trip around the world with him. Brandon is threatened by Dylan and proposes to Kelly, forcing her to choose between the two. Kelly chooses neither, stating that she loves and would always love them both. It is later said that she refuses to choose between them, not because she can't choose, but because it would destroy their friendship in the same way that interest in Dylan damaged her friendship with Brenda.

During the show's sixth season, Dylan finds out that the FBI believes a mobster named Anthony Marchette killed his father and decides to seek revenge. He uses the mobster's daughter, Toni Marchette to get close to him, but soon finds himself falling in love with her. Despite Dylan's feud with the mobster (with whom Toni is very close), the two eventually decide to get married and relocate to Hawaii, which results in Toni's father ordering a hit on Dylan.

The hitman ends up accidentally killing Toni, who is driving Dylan's car in a bad rain storm at the time. Dylan, distraught, is given a gun by Anthony Marchette, who asks Dylan to kill him. Dylan is tempted, but refuses, telling him that "The killing is done." It is later revealed that Marchette had killed himself shortly after that exchange. Soon afterward, Dylan leaves town on his motorcycle after exchanging a farewell with Brandon.

When he returns, he reveals that he sold his house. He takes his Porsche out of storage and, after much thinking, sells it and decides to burn the money, where he runs into a drug dealer that gives him heroin.

=== Seasons 9 and 10 ===
Dylan returns to Beverly Hills towards the beginning of the ninth season, apparently because he misses his home and friends, although he admits to Kelly that he misses her especially. He also relapses and is once again on heroin (however, all references to his alcoholism are absent and he is frequently seen drinking alcoholic beverages in casual, social situations). After failing to win Kelly back, he starts dating the new bad girl Gina Kincaid, despite obviously still having feelings for Kelly. Dylan and Kelly battle a mutual attraction, despite being in on-and-off relationships with Gina and Matt Durning respectively. This is especially noticeable when Kelly blames Gina and others for Dylan's drug problems (as with the case back in Season 5 with Kelly blaming Valerie for Dylan's drug problems), and gets Steve to take the credit for a heroic act (in Dylan's stead) to avoid having anybody know that she and Dylan were out together.

In the show's final season, Dylan finds out that his father faked his death and is in the Witness Protection Program. After being furious that Jack has let Dylan think his father was dead for seven years, he later accepts that it was the right thing to do when news of Jack's survival quickly makes its way to unfriendly ears. Dylan's relationship with Gina also ends when, upon considering leaving Los Angeles with her, he finally admits that he's still in love with Kelly and can't leave.

In the two-part series finale "The Penultimate" and "Ode to Joy", Dylan and Kelly reunite at Donna Martin and David Silver's wedding with a kiss.

== Missing years ==
After the death of his wife Toni in 1995, Dylan went to London and reunited with Brenda, living with her in her London apartment. They were together again by the spring of 1996, when Donna sends correspondence to Brenda's apartment but instead receives return correspondence from Dylan at the apartment in London.

In the spring of 1998, Dylan's half-sister went to live with Dylan and Brenda in London with Kelly and Brandon planning to visit them during their honeymoon. When Dylan returned in November of that same year, however, he told Kelly he had broken up with Brenda two years earlier.

In 2004, he fathered a son with Kelly, named Sammy. They broke up soon afterward. After Sammy's birth, Brenda continued to keep in contact with Dylan, telling him not to screw things up with Kelly. Dylan began to move around a lot and rarely visited Sammy. He also kept in contact with Brandon, from whom he obtained Brenda's email.

== 90210 ==
In episode 6, Dylan calls Brenda while she is talking to Kelly and Ryan. When Kelly finds out it's Dylan on the line, she talks to him. It turns out that Dylan wants to try to be a family again with her and Sammy. However, this would mean they would have to move away from Beverly Hills. After much thought, Kelly breaks up with Ryan, as she said that she needs to try to work things out with Dylan. Ryan asks Kelly why Dylan would call Brenda's phone, not hers, if he wanted to talk to Kelly. Fearing Brenda and Dylan were secretly back together, Kelly confronts Brenda. After hearing Brenda say that her and Dylan's relationship is platonic, Brenda and Kelly make up. Kelly decides to try to repair her relationship with Dylan, while Brenda sadly deletes his number from her cell phone. It is implied that there may have been more to the story of Brenda and Dylan's relationship that she didn't share with Kelly, as Brenda shed some tears when deleting Dylan's phone number.

In episode 10, Kelly comes back to Beverly Hills and reveals that a romantic reunion with Dylan did not work out, as he has the same commitment issues that plagued their relationship before. She also comments on how he looks exactly the same as he did in high school.

== Departure and return to Beverly Hills, 90210 ==
Luke Perry left Beverly Hills, 90210 in the fall of 1995 as he wanted to pursue other projects. He returned in 1998 and stayed for the rest of the series' run, but was credited as a "Special Guest Star"—much like Heather Locklear was on Melrose Place.

== Reception ==
Dylan McKay was considered one of the show's most popular characters, and a prime example of the "bad boy" archetype in popular culture.
