= Donna Martin =

Fictional character from the Beverly Hills, 90210 franchise

Donna Martin Silver
- Portrayed by: Tori Spelling
- Duration: 1990–2000; 2009; 2019–present
- First appearance: "Class of Beverly Hills" (Beverly Hills, 90210)
- Created by: Darren Star
In-universe information
- Occupation: Fashion designer Owner of Now Wear This; Designer of Donna Martin Originals clothing line
- Children: Ruby Silver (daughter, with David)
- Other relatives: John Martin (father, deceased); Felice Martin (mother); Gina Kincaid (half-sister)

Donna Martin Silver is a fictional character from the Beverly Hills, 90210 franchise, portrayed by Tori Spelling from 1990 to 2000. Spelling reprised her role in 90210 for a multi-episode arc in 2009.

== Casting ==
When Tori Spelling auditioned for the role, she auditioned with a different last name, to avoid accusations of nepotism since her father was the series producer.

== Background ==
Donna was introduced in the first season as Kelly Taylor's best friend. For the early part of the first season, the Donna character was a supporting role, but gradually became a main character with her own storylines. Donna grew up in a very wealthy Beverly Hills household, the only child of Dr. John Martin, a successful physician and her mother Felice Martin, a socialite. Donna grew up as a strict Catholic, and her mother's strict rules on morality would be a running storyline for much of the show. Because of this, Donna by choice remained a virgin for much of the show's run, until she was well into college.

In high school, Donna discovered she had dyslexia and struggled at exams. She also almost failed to graduate after she was caught drinking alcohol at the senior prom. This led to a student demonstration to support her, and the slogan of her classmates "Donna Martin graduates!" would go on to become a pop culture catchphrase.

Donna graduated from the show's fictional California University with a degree in Fashion & Marketing and would later go on to run her own fashion boutique. In the final season, Donna discovered that her cousin Gina Kincaid, with whom she had a troubled relationship, was actually her half-sister. Then, when Donna's father died, she blamed Gina for his death, but they eventually made up at the funeral.

During the late 1990s, she and long time friend Kelly Taylor opened a clothing store called "Now Wear This".

== Relationships ==
Donna first became romantically involved with David Silver in high school, after going to a dance together. After they had been dating for a couple of months, David tried to get Donna to have sex with him, at which point Donna admitted to being a virgin and revealed that she wanted to wait until marriage. David agreed to respect Donna's wishes, and they continued dating. David cheated on Donna the next summer, but he apologized. Finally, at the senior prom, Donna agreed to have sex with David, but was then caught drinking and her punishment disrupted their plans.

The next year, David's pressures on Donna finally led her to agree to have sex with him, but she changed her mind at the last minute, and David got upset and broke up with her. David then started doing drugs, including crystal meth. and when Donna found out, she tried to help him. Because of this, Donna and David got back together. However, a few months later, Donna found David in the back of a limo, having sex with someone else and they split up once again.

The following year after entering college, Donna met Griffin Stone (Casper Van Dien), and they began dating. Donna became romantically involved with Ray Pruit, a construction worker and budding singer. Donna was dating Griffin Stone while talking to Ray Pruit. Donna was then stuck with both guys but did not know whom to choose. She then dumped Griffin Stone for trying to sleep with her. Ray agreed to respect Donna's virginity, and wrote a song for her. Ray told Donna that he was not going to pressure her into doing anything she was uncomfortable doing.

A few months later, a man named Garret Slan tried to rape her at knifepoint. She was rescued by David, but she and Ray continued dating. Donna and Ray celebrated the holidays together and their relationship got more intimate. Donna dated Ray for a year, but he eventually became abusive. He knocked her down a flight of stairs in Palm Springs but she lied about what happened and stayed with him. It was only when she learned that Ray had cheated on her with Valerie Malone that she broke up with him. She then got involved with Joe Bradley (Cameron Bancroft). A jealous Ray then started to harass the newly formed couple, which prompted a physical altercation between Joe and Ray. This led to Ray filing assault charges against Joe, jeopardizing his college football career. At Brandon’s advisement, Ray decided to let Donna go and drop the charges against Joe and then left town. Joe proposed to Donna, but she tearfully refused and they broke up.

Finally, on their college graduation night, Donna and David had sex and ultimately reconciled, causing a rift with her mother. The pair moved in together but the reconciliation did not last long and Donna left David again after he forged a check in her name. Donna then had a serious romance with Noah Hunter, but that eventually ended and in the final season, she got back together with David again and the pair married in the show's series finale in 2000.

== 90210 ==
In episode 4 of the spin-off 90210, Kelly and Brenda crack a joke about being back at West Beverly and still hearing "Donna Martin Graduates." Also, in conversation Kelly and Brenda mention that Donna has a baby and that it is "so cute." It is revealed that Donna has returned to Beverly Hills after experiencing a rough patch in her relationship with David. Later on, Donna faces a dilemma when she must choose between returning to Japan to be with David or moving back to Beverly Hills with their daughter, Ruby.

=== Recurring themes ===
One of the recurring themes of the show was Donna's many attempts to lose her virginity. Some TV and social critics have criticised the character for further stigmatising virginity.

== Reception ==
Tori Spelling was often accused of getting the role of Donna Martin due to her father Aaron Spelling, the creator and executive producer of Beverly Hills 90210. The character has become part of a popular meme called "Donna Martin graduates".
