= Sydney Andrews =

- Melrose Place character
- Portrayed by: Laura Leighton
- Duration: 1993–97; 2009–10
- First appearance: Melrose Place "Single White Sister" (1993)
- Last appearance: Melrose Place (2009) "Wilshire" (2010)
- Created by: Darren Star
In-universe information
- Occupation: Art dealer; Landlord; Ad executive; Boutique owner; Porn producer; Receptionist; Waitress; Stripper; Madam; Prostitute; Assistant
- Father: George Andrews
- Mother: Katherine Andrews
- Sisters: Jane Andrews (adoptive)
- Husband: Michael Mancini (1994); Craig Field (1997)
- Daughters: Violet Foster
- Grandparents: Unnamed grandmother

Sydney Andrews is a fictional character in the American soap opera, Melrose Place, and its 2009 continuation. She is portrayed by Laura Leighton.

Initially presented as an easy-going young woman with questionable priorities, Sydney would gradually be developed into one of the series' most multi-faceted characters. During her introduction in the first and second seasons, Sydney is prone to making rash and irresponsible decisions, such as getting involved with her sister's ex, and having a brush with the law. Though she often appears carefree and detached, she displays a sensitive side while enduring the consequences of her actions, and while sharing comforting moments with others. Later during the second season, Sydney reveals an opportunistic nature during her first blackmail scheme. Following this story, the character gained a reputation for having a playful and uninhibited side.

Throughout a good deal of the third season, Sydney is more often presented as a victim, being subjected to much mistreatment and stress. While continuing to endure, she finds support from unexpected people, and later attempts to help others during a chaotic event. The series' fourth season returns the character to her clever and scheming ways, though she is presented more as comedic relief during a period of rather serious story lines, and continues to display a compassionate side. In the fifth season, following years of romantic interests, she appears to finally obtain a fulfilling but short-lived relationship. Afterward, at her wedding, she is seemingly killed after being hit by a motorist, but reappears alive in the spin-off. In the latter series, Sydney is revealed to have a daughter named Violet.

The character's impact is generally held in high regard. In its biographical article on Leighton, Yahoo! labels Sydney a "begrudgingly beloved" character. While reporting on the original series in 1994, Rolling Stone, Entertainment Weekly, and People magazine all featured Leighton on their covers. Additionally, she earned a Golden Globe nomination for the role in 1995.

== Storylines ==
=== Melrose Place ===
Sydney comes to Los Angeles in the first season to visit her older sister Jane Mancini (Josie Bissett) in the Melrose Place apartment complex. Sydney has a turbulent relationship with Jane's husband Michael (Thomas Calabro), and ultimately returns to Chicago after she and Jane are unable to work out their differences.

After Jane leaves Michael over his adultery with Kimberly Shaw (Marcia Cross), Sydney returns in the second season, living with Jane and offering her comfort. Soon Sydney displays a secret attraction toward Michael. Desperate for money, she temporarily becomes a prostitute and begins an affair with Michael, who she later blackmails into marriage when it appears that he had been responsible for Kimberly's death via drunk driving. The marriage with Michael is successful until Kimberly reappears alive. Forced out of her home, Sydney soon begins plotting Michael's death with Kimberly. Kimberly uses Sydney as a patsy in the plan, bluntly tells her that she's going to turn her in to the police unless she flees L.A., and Sydney is arrested when she doesn't do so—even after Matt found out Kimberly was responsible for the near-fatal hit-and-run attack on Michael, Sydney pleads guilty and gets probation for it, with the truth remaining either hidden or blocked by Michael.

In the third season, while Jane is later freed due to questions about her sanity and sent to a mental institution, Sydney works as a waitress and bookkeeper for fellow tenant Jake Hanson (Grant Show), with the two eventually beginning a brief romantic relationship. Later, Sydney discovers that an unstable Kimberly is planning to set off explosions in the apartment complex, and she and Michael manage to warn the other tenants in time.

In season four, Sydney recovers from the explosion and reunites with Michael, but he quickly pursues an affair with Jane and ends his relationship with Sydney. Sydney's scheming nature begins to reemerge, though she continues to display a compassionate side. Sydney eventually moves on to dating Bobby Parezi (John Enos III), Amanda Woodward's (Heather Locklear) former brother-in-law, who later dies. After Jane is brutally abused by her ex-boyfriend Richard Hart (Patrick Muldoon), Jane plans to shoot him in vengeance, while Sydney tries to dissuade her from going through with it. Confronting Richard, Jane hesitates to pull the trigger, doing so only when he advances on her. She then realizes that Sydney had secretly removed the bullets from her gun. As Richard tries to beat Jane, Sydney knocks him unconscious with a shovel. Thinking he is dead, they bury him; he crawls out of his grave to stalk them, and is later killed in a shoot-out with the police. Jane later moves back to Chicago, the sisters acknowledging their bond and parting on good terms.

Sydney finds happiness with Craig Field (David Charvet). Together, they usurp Amanda and form their own advertising agency, Sky High, raiding most of her staff and effectively putting an end to D&D. The on-and-off couple are married in the fifth season finale, but at the wedding reception Sydney is hit by a motorist, forcibly driven by her one-time business partner Samantha Reilly's (Brooke Langton) abusive father. Sydney is seemingly killed, and a distraught Craig later commits suicide.

=== Melrose Place (2009) ===
Sydney is revealed to be alive in the 2009 series, her death faked with Michael's assistance. She is now the landlady of 4616 Melrose Place, and a central figure in the lives of its current tenants. In the opening scenes of the pilot, Sydney is found murdered, floating in the pool. Several of the building's residents become suspects, their backstories with Sydney revealed in flashbacks. It is revealed in flashbacks how Michael helped Sydney fake her death (that would have taken place during the time of the original series off-screen). Sydney believed that someone from her past was the one who ran her down (it was in fact Samantha and her father). Believing her husband was at risk, Sydney convinced Michael to help her. She disappeared, and later returned and did time for faking her death. Because of the injuries she sustained in the accident, Sydney developed a nasty drug and alcohol problem.

Sydney is shown to have had brief intimate relationships with Michael, his estranged son David and Auggie Kirkpatrick. She is revealed to be the mother of new resident Violet Foster (Ashlee Simpson). Initially rejecting Violet and claiming to have never given birth to a child, Sydney later tells Violet she wants to get to know her, only to be murdered soon after. Sydney's death brings Jane to town as the new owner of the building. Threatening to use evidence from Sydney to implicate Ella in the murder, Jane blackmails Ella into getting a celebrity client to wear Jane's designs. The return of Amanda Woodward to Los Angeles is also connected to Sydney, who had been selling stolen paintings for Amanda but had kept one for herself and hidden it before her death. In episode 12 it is revealed that Michael's wife Vanessa had visited Sydney to confront her about the affair with Michael. Sydney's taunts about Vanessa and Michael's son Noah actually being fathered by David had driven Vanessa to attack and ultimately kill Sydney. Suspecting Vanessa, David leaves Noah with Violet to keep Vanessa from leaving town with her son; confronting her mother's killer, Violet wrestles a gun-toting Vanessa into the pool and drowns her.

In episode 18, she reappears as a ghost in Amanda's imagination.

== Reception ==
In its biographical article on Leighton, Yahoo! states that she gave the character "expressive facial movements, fiery intensity, and a surprising likable quality." The article goes on to say that "despite all her misdeeds, Sydney invariably became sympathetic when the show's treacherous tide turned against her." As the original series gained popularity, the show received attention from Rolling Stone, Entertainment Weekly, and People magazine, with Leighton being featured on every cover. In 1995, the actress was nominated for a Golden Globe Award for her role on Melrose Place. When announcing her return for the 2009 spin-off, The Hollywood Reporter recognized Sydney as "one of the most popular characters" from the original show. When the follow-up series premiered, Entertainment Weekly placed Leighton's portrayal of Sydney as number one on their weekly "Must List", calling her "the same bitchy, unhinged instigator we adored."

Amy Amatangelo of Zap2it criticized the decision to kill the character in the 2009 series, labeling it a mistake. Alan Sepinwall of NJ.com called the move "a poor way to use one of the more memorable vixens of '90s Melrose." In a 2009 interview, producer Todd Slavkin claimed that the show had not ruled out the possibility of bringing back Sydney, stating, "We would never close the door officially."
