= List of Melrose Place characters =

The cast of Melrose Place season three (1994–1995). From left to right: Heather Locklear, Andrew Shue, Courtney Thorne-Smith, Grant Show, Laura Leighton, Doug Savant, Daphne Zuniga, Thomas Calabro, Josie Bissett and Marcia Cross.

Melrose Place is an American prime time television soap opera that aired on Fox from July 8, 1992, to May 24, 1999, for seven seasons. The series follows the lives of a group of young adults living in an apartment complex at 4616 Melrose Place, in West Hollywood, California. Created by Darren Star and executive produced by Aaron Spelling, Melrose Place stars an ensemble cast that includes Josie Bissett, Thomas Calabro, Doug Savant, Grant Show, Andrew Shue, Courtney Thorne-Smith, Daphne Zuniga, Heather Locklear, Laura Leighton and Marcia Cross.

A continuation of the series, also called Melrose Place, aired for one season from September 8, 2009, to April 13, 2010, on The CW.

== Overview ==
Character	Actor	Melrose Place (1992–99)							Melrose Place (2009)	Melrose Place revival
Character	Actor	1	2	3	4	5	6 (Note: The last 7 episodes of season 6 were aired on Fox over the summer of 1998 as part of season 7 under the promotional title "Summer of Love". It featured the last appearances of Ashby, Langton, Milano, Rinna and Shue, as well as Bissett in a recurring role.)	7	Melrose Place (2009)	Melrose Place revival
Jane Mancini	Josie Bissett	Main (Note: Bissett departs in "Escape From L.A." (ep. 5.15).)	Main	Main	Main	Main	Recurring	Main	Guest	TBA
Michael Mancini	Thomas Calabro	Main	Main	Main	Main	Main	Main	Main	Recurring	TBA
Sandy Harling	Amy Locane	Main (Note: Locane departs in "Dreams Come True" (ep. 1.13).)								
Matt Fielding	Doug Savant	Main (Note: Savant departs in "A Brand New Day" (ep. 6.1).)	Main	Main	Main	Main	Main			TBA
Jake Hanson	Grant Show	Main	Main	Main	Main	Main				TBA
Billy Campbell	Andrew Shue	Main	Main	Main	Main	Main	Main			TBA
Alison Parker	Courtney Thorne-Smith	Main	Main	Main	Main	Main				TBA
Rhonda Blair	Vanessa Williams	Main								TBA
Jo Reynolds	Daphne Zuniga	Main (Note: Zuniga is added to the opening credits from "House of God" (ep. 1.15).)	Main	Main	Main				Guest	Confirmed
Amanda Woodward	Heather Locklear	Recurring	Main (Note: Locklear is credited in the opening credits as "special guest star".)	Main	Main	Main	Main	Main	Recurring	Confirmed
Sydney Andrews	Laura Leighton	Guest	Recurring	Main	Main	Main			Recurring	Confirmed
Kimberly Shaw	Marcia Cross	Recurring	Recurring	Recurring	Main (Note: Cross departs in "The Dead Wives Club" (ep. 5.27).)	Main				TBA
Brooke Armstrong	Kristin Davis			Recurring	Main (Note: Davis departs in "Devil in a Wet Dress" (ep. 4.22).)					TBA
Peter Burns	Jack Wagner			Recurring	Main	Main	Main	Main		TBA
Kyle McBride	Rob Estes	(Note: Estes first appears as Michael's college friend Sam Towler in "Irreconcilable Similarites" (ep. 1.25) and "Fire Power" (ep. 2.4).)				Main	Main	Main		TBA
Samantha Reilly	Brooke Langton				Guest	Main	Main			TBA
Taylor McBride	Lisa Rinna					Main	Main			TBA
Megan Lewis	Kelly Rutherford					Main (Note: Rutherford appears in a recurring role from "Un-Janed Melody" (ep. 5.5), before being added to the opening credits from "The Eyes of the Storm" (ep. 5.16).)	Main	Main		TBA
Craig Field	David Charvet					Main (Note: Charavet appears in a recurring role from "Un-Janed Melody" (ep. 5.5), before being added to the opening credits from "Deja Vu, All Over Again" (ep. 5.28). He departs in "Coop de Grace" (ep. 6.17).)	Main			TBA
Brett Cooper	Linden Ashby	(Note: Ashby first appears as Jo's ex-husband Charles Reynolds in "Single White Sister" (ep. 1.19) and "Peanut Butter and Jealousy" (ep. 1.20).)					Main			TBA
Jennifer Mancini	Alyssa Milano					Recurring	Main			TBA
Lexi Sterling	Jamie Luner						Main (Note: Luner is added to the opening credits from "The Doctor Is In...Deep" (ep. 6.4).)	Main		TBA
Ryan McBride	John Haymes Newton							Main		TBA
Ella Simms	Katie Cassidy								Main	
Auggie Kirkpatrick	Colin Egglesfield								Main (Note: Egglesfield and Simpson depart in "San Vicente" (ep. 1.12).)	
Lauren Yung	Stephanie Jacobsen								Main	
Riley Richmond	Jessica Lucas								Main	
Jonah Miller	Michael Rady								Main	
David Breck	Shaun Sipos								Main	
Violet Foster	Ashlee Simpson								Main	

Cast notes

== Main cast members ==
=== Jane Mancini ===
Jane is portrayed by Josie Bissett.

=== Michael Mancini ===
Michael is portrayed by Thomas Calabro.

=== Sandy Harling ===
Sandy is portrayed by Amy Locane. Sandy is an aspiring actress from South Carolina, and Rhonda's roommate. During her duration on the show, she works at Shooters, the group's favorite bar. It is revealed that she was once in a relationship with Jake Hanson. She leaves in the thirteenth episode of season one ("Dreams Come True"), after getting a job on a soap opera in New York City. After her departure, she is only mentioned again once in season 1 episode 14, when Rhonda is looking for a new roommate.

=== Billy Campbell ===
Billy is portrayed by Andrew Shue. In the pilot, he moves in with Alison Parker after her roommate moves out in the middle of the night. In the first season he is an aspiring writer and taxi driver. He later works for a newspaper, and later starts working at D&D Advertising with Alison and Amanda. His relationship with Alison starts off platonically. In season one, he dates Amanda briefly and she becomes pregnant with his child, but soon miscarries. After this, he and Alison become a couple. He and Alison get engaged in season two, but she gets cold feet on the day of the wedding due to personal issues with her father. Despite no having a romantic relationship with Alison, he's always there to help her during times of need. At the end of season three, after Alison moves to Hong Kong for a job offer, he marries his coworker Brooke Armstrong. His marriage to Brooke puts a strain on his friendship with Alison. After Brooke's death, Billy becomes very angry and hostile towards others. These feelings eventually go away, after he visits Brooke's grave.

In season 5, he begins a romance with Samantha Reilly, and in season 6 they get married. The marriage ends after Samantha has an affair with baseball player, Jeff Baylor, the same time that Billy became interested in Jennifer Mancini. Billy and Jennifer fell in love, and in season 7, Billy receives a job offer in Rome, and the two leave Melrose Place together.

=== Matt Fielding ===
Matt is portrayed by Doug Savant.

=== Jake Hanson ===
Jake is portrayed by Grant Show.

=== Alison Parker ===
Alison is portrayed by Courtney Thorne-Smith. Alison is originally from Wisconsin. She has many romances during the show, perhaps the most notable being with Billy Campbell. She works at D&D Advertising during much of the series. Alison also experiences many traumas during the course of the show; in season one, she moves to Seattle with her boyfriend Keith Gray. She travels to Los Angeles to attend the funeral of Billy's father, and while she's there she decides to break up with Keith and move back to L.A. Keith returns to Los Angeles to try and win Alison back, and when she tells him she does not want a relationship with him, he attempts to rape her. He later commits suicide while talking to her on the phone. It is revealed in the season two finale (before marrying Billy) that her father molested her. In season three, she develops a drinking problem, which causes many problems with her friends and coworkers, and she is sent to a rehab center. When Kimberly Shaw blows up the apartment complex in the season four premiere, Alison is left temporarily blind. After recovering, she dates and marries Hayley Armstrong, Brooke's father. Hayley dies soon after by accidentally falling off of his yacht while drunk. When he dies, she finds out that he tricked her into signing divorce papers, and therefore Alison does not receive any of his money.

Alison eventually leaves D&D Advertising. At one point she was working at the bar Shooters, during which she fell in love with Jake. Initially, Alison and Jake wanted to keep their relationship a secret from their exes, Billy and Jane, respectively. In season 5, Alison becomes pregnant with Jake's baby and he proposes to her. She doesn't feel ready to have a child just yet and considers an abortion. She and Jake go to a courthouse to get married, but she gets cold feet. She eventually decides to keep the baby, and after a brief separation from Jake, they get back together. Eventually, Alison is told that her pregnancy is life-threatening, and must get an abortion in order to survive. She is later told that she can never have kids. Jake is okay with this, and they get married. During their honeymoon, Alison's alcoholism returns. They are later rejected by an adoption agency when the agent discovers that they own a bar and that she's an alcoholic. Alison feels that she is taking away Jake's dream to start a family, and she pushes him back to his son and the boy's mother, Colleen.

After her break-up with Jake, Alison moves to Atlanta, leaving the show. A year later, Amanda, having kept in touch with Alison, reveals that she had problems adjusting to Atlanta, and that she is back in rehab.

=== Rhonda Blair ===
Rhonda is portrayed by Vanessa A. Williams. Rhonda is a fitness instructor. She is also Sandy's roommate and Matt's confidante. She had a relationship with Terrence Haggard, whom she broke up with after he proposed to her too soon. However, they soon reconciled and she proposed to Terrence, who accepted. She moves out of the apartment building sometime after season one (but before season two) after her engagement. After her departure, she is only mentioned twice, in the second-season premiere and the sixth-season premiere, both by Matt.

=== Jo Reynolds ===
Jo is portrayed by Daphne Zuniga.

=== Amanda Woodward ===
Amanda is portrayed by Heather Locklear.

=== Sydney Andrews ===
Sydney is portrayed by Laura Leighton.

=== Kimberly Shaw ===
Kimberly Shaw was portrayed by Marcia Cross for the first five seasons from 1992 to 1997.

Kimberly first appears in the first season as the resident psychotherapist at Wilshire Memorial, as a colleague of Michael Mancini. The two become friends, and begin to have an affair. In later seasons, it is revealed that Kimberly has severe mental problems, including dissociative identity disorder. In the final season, she is diagnosed with terminal brain cancer.

=== Brooke Armstrong ===
Brooke was portrayed by Kristin Davis. Brooke was introduced in season three as the daughter of Hayley Armstrong, a wealthy businessman, and she was first an intern and then an employee at D&D Advertising. She immediately took an interest in Billy and they began a relationship, though Brooke didn't inform Billy that she was engaged at the time to a man named Lowell. Brooke broke it off with Lowell and, wanting to have Billy all to herself, did her best to cut others out of his life. This was especially true with regard to Alison Parker, whom Brooke convinced to move to Hong Kong. After Alison moved to Hong Kong Brooke and Billy continued their relationship and eventually became engaged, marrying at Brooke's father's estate. Hayley didn't have a lot of respect for Billy and was not convinced the marriage is a good idea, but went along with it to make Brooke happy. Brooke and Billy's marriage had some high points, but they had issues with trust and at one point, Brooke was lying to Billy about being pregnant. She originally thought she was pregnant but then learned she was having a hysterical pregnancy, and rather than telling Billy the truth she pretended she'd lost the baby in a miscarriage.

After Brooke's father died, she learned that he had changed his will to disinherit her. Billy, fed up with Brooke's lying and controlling ways, decided to divorce her and she moved out of their shared apartment and into a hotel. In the season four episode "No Lifeguard on Duty", Brooke showed up at the Melrose Place apartment complex and antagonized Billy as he left the building. She then slipped at the side of the pool, hit her head on the edge, and drowned.

=== Peter Burns ===
Peter is portrayed by Jack Wagner. Dr. Peter Burns first appears in the third season as the chief of staff at Wilshire Memorial Hospital, where Michael, Kimberly and Matt also work. He has been in a relationship with Amanda several times. He is often very manipulative around people, particularly Michael and Amanda. In season four, after Kimberly is institutionalized, he takes a romantic interest in her, and also tries to help her get her life back together. Towards the end of season four, while Kimberly is running a mental hospital under the personality of "Betsy", she gets Peter institutionalized, despite the fact he is sane, while she is not. Michael and Amanda eventually rescue him. After he is rescued, it is revealed his real name is Peter Howell, and he was once married to a woman named Beth, now deceased.

In season five, it is revealed Beth is Taylor's sister, and he eventually starts a relationship with Taylor, while still married to Amanda. This affair would put an end to both his marriage, and Taylor's marriage to Kyle. As his relationship with Taylor began to deteriorate, Taylor told him she was pregnant in an attempt to save him. This plan does not work however, as he finds out the truth and humiliates her at their wedding.

Peter then entered a relationship with Lexi, but he broke up the relationship because he still had feelings for Amanda. Peter attempted to get Amanda back with no success, so he began a relationship with Eve. Soon after, Peter and Eve got married. Although Lexi tried to break them up, Peter and Eve stayed together. Their relationship began to fail however when Peter and Amanda went on a business trip and became close again, realizing they have always loved each other no matter who they are with, resulting in Peter being unfaithful to Eve. Eve and Peter then get divorced.

When Eve discovers Amanda was guilty of a murder she was imprisoned for prior to the show, Eve becomes mentally unstable, and becomes destructive towards their relationship.

At the end of the series, Peter and Amanda became rich and moved to an island, escaping the country to avoid jail time. The couple then gets married and decides to have a family, and Peter says they will name their kids after the former residents of Melrose Place, promising Amanda they will not name any of their children after Kimberly.

=== Kyle McBride ===
Kyle is portrayed by Rob Estes. First appearing in season five, along with his wife, Taylor, Kyle is a former Marine, and a chef from Boston. It is revealed that prior to the show, he had an affair with Jennifer. After he had a fight with Taylor, he had a brief affair with Sydney, while Taylor had an affair with Peter. He owns his own restaurant called Kyle's. After Amanda proposed a business arrangement in which she would invest in a jazz club called The Upstairs, which Kyle had dreamed of owning, the two planned to get divorces that way each of their unfaithful spouses (Taylor and Peter) would have no legal rights over the business. Kyle was devastated about the divorce because his parents were married for 35 years, and he had hoped for the same thing. During this time, he and Amanda kissed, but they both agreed not to continue a relationship. However, they did eventually start a serious relationship, and they got married in season 6. Before their wedding, Kyle began having nightmares over a woman, Christine Denton, whom he knew during his time in the Marines. Christine had died in the Gulf War, but Taylor, along with Kyle's former friend and fellow Marine, Nick Reardon, hired a woman to pose as Christine in order to split Kyle and Amanda up. When Kyle was not interested in going back to the fake-Christine, she faked being suicidal on their wedding day, postponing the wedding, as Kyle went out to save her. However, Nick accidentally killed Tiffany ("Christine"), and he and Taylor put her on railroad tracks, making it appear that she did commit suicide.

Kyle and Peter were able to put their differences aside and become friends. Kyle and Amanda later decide to have a baby together, but Kyle is informed that he is sterile. After finding out, he develops a drinking problem. When Amanda discovers she is pregnant, he accuses her of cheating on him, and he throws her off a balcony, causing a miscarriage. He later finds out was misdiagnosed, the baby was his, and Amanda was faithful. However, his drinking problem caused he and Amanda to divorce, and she reunited with Peter.

Afterwards, he started a relationship with Jane. When Jane found out she was pregnant with Michael's baby, Kyle agrees to help her raise it, and they continue living together happily.

=== Samantha Reilly ===
Samantha is portrayed by Brooke Langton. Samantha first appears in season 4, as an artist from Maryland, who has moved to Los Angeles to be an artist and Jane's roommate. She began dating Billy, but it did not last as she realized he still had feelings for Alison. She then started dating Craig, who was working with Billy at the time at D&D Advertising, who eventually bought her a studio, but Samantha later broke it off with Craig. She was working at Jane's store (later Sydney's), but lost her job after the store closed down due to a lawsuit. While she began dating Billy again, her abusive convict father, Jim, escaped from prison in Maryland. As she was protecting him, Samantha and Billy got arrested for aiding a known criminal. Although they were released, Jim continued to blackmail them. One time, Jim robbed Samantha in the middle of a retail store, and took her hostage. As they were speeding away in a car, the car crashed into Sydney's wedding, hurting Sydney and killing Jim in the process.

In season 6, Billy and Samantha got married. During the marriage, both parties harbored romantic feelings for other people. Samantha began an affair with a baseball player, Jeff Baylor, while Billy became attracted to Jennifer. In an attempt to keep Billy away from Jennifer, she sent a fake fax, pretending to be Alison, before he left with Jennifer to Rome. Jeff became disgusted with Samantha's behaviour, and he broke up with her and moved to Florida. However, Samantha followed him there, and proposed to him. He accepted her proposal, and she moved to Florida to be with him, concluding her time on the show.

=== Taylor McBride ===
Taylor is portrayed by Lisa Rinna. First appearing in season five when she and her husband, Kyle, move to Los Angeles from Boston. It is eventually revealed that her late sister, Beth Davis, was married to Peter. She eventually has an affair with Peter, while he is still married to Amanda, and this puts an end to both her marriage and Peter's marriage. When her relationship with Peter began to deteriorate, she told him that she was pregnant in an attempt to keep him around. The attempt was unsuccessful, and he leaves her at the altar at their wedding. After being humiliated by Peter, she tries to win Kyle back. In an attempt to break up Kyle and Amanda, Taylor and Kyle's friend, Nick, hired a woman to pretend to be Christine, a woman who Kyle knew when he fought in the Gulf War. Although the real Christine actually did die in the war, Nick led Taylor to believe Tiffany (the fake Christine) to be the real Christine. Taylor and Nick wanted the fake Christine to pretend being suicidal, that way Kyle would try to go and save her on his and Amanda's wedding day. This does not go as planned, as Nick and Taylor accidentally kill "Christine", and make it look like a suicide.

Eventually, Taylor became pregnant with Michael's baby after a short fling, and the two were living together, though they were not in a relationship. Michael then reunited with his ex-wife, Jane, and Taylor gives birth to a son, Michael Davis. Shortly after giving birth, Taylor moves back to Boston with her son.

=== Megan Lewis ===
Megan is portrayed by Kelly Rutherford. First appearing in season five, Megan is a prostitute Kimberly hires to have sex with Michael, during a time Kimberly does not feel well enough to do so herself. Megan became a prostitute after she ran away from home at the age of 14, due to an alcoholic father. Michael and Megan's relationship becomes more romantic than Kimberly had planned. Kimberly catches Michael and Megan together and files for divorce, and then Michael marries Megan in Las Vegas. Although Michael has divorced Kimberly, he stays close to her while she is sick, which Megan is annoyed by. Megan's controlling former pimp, Josh Laughlin, in an attempt to kidnap Megan, tells Michael she is still working for him, even though she is not. This causes her and Michael to separate temporarily, but they later get back together when he finds out Kimberly hired her.

Eventually, Megan becomes disgusted by Michael, and she divorces him.

=== Craig Field ===
Craig is portrayed by David Charvet. First appearing in the fifth season, he is introduced as the son of Arthur Field, the chairman of D&D Advertising. After his father's death from a heart attack that came after an argument with Craig, Craig did not have any money. He began working at D&D Advertising, during which he became romantically interested in Amanda, but she declined his advances, as she was still married to Peter. During a brief period in which Amanda and Peter were separated, Craig framed Amanda for adultery, leading an end to her and Peter's marriage. Craig and Amanda then had sex for real, but she did want to further their relationship.

Eventually, Craig fell in love with Sydney. In the season five finale, they got married. Unfortunately, Sydney was supposedly killed at the wedding after being hit by a car that Jim Reilly, Samantha's father, was driving. Sydney's death caused Craig to become depressed. While mourning Sydney's death, he was comforted by Jennifer, whom he eventually had a brief relationship with, but it did not last because of his unfaithfulness. He eventually committed suicide by gunshot, stating that he missed Sydney.

=== Brett Cooper ===
Coop is portrayed by Linden Ashby. Introduced in season six, Brett 'Coop' Cooper was a surgeon who was initially revealed as having had an affair with Kimberly while he was treating her from her car accident in season two, while he was married to Lexi. After he and Lexi got divorced, he moved to Los Angeles, after hearing about Kimberly's death. Afterwards, he began seeing Megan. However, he soon learned that Lexi's father left him an inheritance, which he could only obtain if he remarried her. Though he initially declined, he later discovered that Lexi had been set up to take the fall in her father's embezzlement scheme, and needed five million dollars as a result. To help solve this problem, he entered a platonic marriage with Lexi, and both claimed the inheritance. Although the marriage was supposed to be platonic, Lexi managed to seduce Coop, causing Megan to leave him. Highly resentful, Coop lured Lexi on a sailing trip and attempted to kill her during a storm. Megan however, secretly followed them and saved Lexi's life. Afterwards, Coop left Melrose Place, and Megan and Lexi became friends.

=== Jennifer Mancini ===
Jennifer is portrayed by Alyssa Milano. First appearing in season five, Jennifer is Michael's younger sister. When she was attending college in Boston, she had an affair with Kyle before all of them moved to Los Angeles. After failing to get a job at D&D Advertising, she briefly starts a job at a strip club as a waitress, until Megan, a former prostitute, convinces her not to. Trying to win Kyle back, she continuously taunted Amanda, but eventually gave up on it. She then develops a romantic interest in Craig, who had just lost his wife, Sydney. The romance does not last, as Craig eventually takes his life due to his grief.

In season 6, she has an affair with Billy, who was married to the also-unfaithful Samantha, at the time. In season 7, after Billy and Samantha divorce, Billy receives a job offer in Rome. Jennifer and Billy then move to Rome together, leaving Melrose Place for good.

=== Lexi Sterling ===
Lexi is portrayed by Jamie Luner. She is Coop's ex-wife.

=== Ryan McBride ===
Ryan is portrayed by John Newton. Introduced in the seventh and final season, Ryan is Kyle's estranged brother. They were estranged because Taylor claimed that Ryan tried to hit on her, and Kyle believed Taylor over Ryan. They reconnected when Amanda found out about their relationship from reading Matt's diary after he passed. Shortly after he arrived in Los Angeles, he began working at Amanda Woodward Advertising, and expressed romantic interest in Megan. Although Megan was initially reluctant to his attraction, the two eventually grew closer and started a relationship.

Later, it was revealed that Ryan is a widower with a young daughter. Prior to the show, his wife, Callie, and daughter, Sarah, were in a car accident, and he saved Sarah, with intent to save his wife afterwards, but the car then blew up, killing her. After that, he sent Sarah to live with her aunt Terry in New York, where she was attending boarding school. He vowed to never remarry again, having been engaged three times in the subsequent years. After he visited Sarah in New York, she ran away from the school and Terry to find her father. Meanwhile, Ryan went to New York to look for her, and she was staying with Megan in the meantime. Later, Terry tried to kidnap Sarah, but it did not work as they crashed into a pole while trying to escape. Both survived, but Ryan was granted full custody of Sarah. After gaining custody, Ryan and Megan got married and decided to raise Sarah together.

== Recurring characters ==
=== Richard Hart ===
Richard is portrayed by Patrick Muldoon. Although never credited as a main character, he appears in nearly every episode since his debut in season three until his death in season five. Richard is introduced as the husband of fashion designer, McKenzie Hart, whose business he runs. After McKenzie dies when Kimberly blows up the apartment complex, he begins dating Jane. Richard and Jane become engaged in season four, but he breaks it off with her after learning from Jo that she does not really love him. After a brief relationship with Jo, while Jane is dating Jake, he turns abusive and rapes her. In the season four finale, plotting revenge, Jane attempts to kill him, but that does not go as planned when Sydney secretly removed the bullets from her gun. He then attacks Jane again, but Sydney knocks him unconscious with a shovel, believing him to be dead. The two girls then drive out and bury him in a remote location. In the final scene of season four, it is revealed he is still alive. After he escapes, he begins playing mind games with Jane and Sydney, leading them to believe he is still alive, this is later confirmed when he confronts them directly. He eventually dies in a police stand-off.

=== Eve Cleary ===
Eve is portrayed by Rena Sofer. Although never credited as a main character, she appears in every episode from her first appearance in season 7 all the way to the finale. Eve is introduced as a high school friend of Amanda's. While they were in high school, Eve's boyfriend, Kent, tried to rape Amanda on the bleachers, and she pushed him off the bleachers, killing him in self-defense. Because Amanda's parents were wealthy, she did not have to serve any time for the murder, while Eve was sentenced to 20 years. She was paroled after 15.

After being released from prison, she comes to Los Angeles as a singer at Kyle's club, where she met Peter. Eve initially had some adjustment issues, almost ruining her relationship with Peter by coming on too strong, but Peter stuck with it and eventually fell in love with her. Eve and Peter were eventually married, but Lexi was determined to get Peter back with her, even coming to blows with Eve. Eve was also harassed by a former prison guard, Travis Hill, who threatened to tell everyone her secret about being in prison, but Kyle took care of the problem for her by pummeling the guy and telling him to leave town. After Peter's father died, Eve and Peter become rich, when they find out that the land his father lived on had oil on it. She then buys Kyle's club, while Peter bought Wilshire Memorial Hospital.

When Amanda wanted to land a big client named Tony Marlin, Tony demanded that Amanda help him seduce Eve in order to keep his business. The plan backfired, because when Eve found out about the plan, she threatened Amanda and told her to stay out of her life. In time, Peter's old feelings for Amanda brought his relationship with Eve to an end. Feeling resentful toward Peter and others, Eve undergoes hypnosis in order to understand what happened when she murdered Kent. She discovers that he was still alive after she stopped him from raping Amanda, and Amanda then beat him with a rock, killing him. Now mentally unstable over the truth about her betrayal and the life she lost while in prison, she attempted to run Peter and Amanda over, pretending to be Lexi. She gets Lexi and Michael arrested, but they are soon released. In the series finale, she goes to Peter and Amanda's "funeral" and tosses Peter's "ashes" all over Lexi. After being arrested and put in a jail cell, her cellmate propositions here by trilling that she was a cheerleader too. Eve smiles insanely and says "I've always relied...on the kindness of cheerleaders" as her story on the show ends.

=== Other recurring characters ===
- Jennie Garth, Brian Austin Green, Tori Spelling, Ian Ziering as Kelly Taylor, David Silver, Donna Martin and Steve Sanders (season 1) from Beverly Hills, 90210
- Deborah Adair as Lucy Cabot (season 1), president of D&D Advertising, Alison and Amanda's boss
- Salome Jens as Joan Campbell (seasons 1, 6), Billy's mother
- Carmen Argenziano as Dr. Stanley Levin (seasons 1–3), chief of staff at Wilshire Memorial Hospital, Michael and Kimberly's boss
- William R. Moses as Keith Gray (seasons 1–2), married marine biologist, romantically involved with Alison
- James Handy as Matt Fielding Sr. (seasons 1, 3–4), Matt's father
- Claudette Nevins as Constance Fielding (seasons 1, 3–5, 7), Matt's mother
- Rae Dawn Chong as Carrie Fellows (season 1), Rhonda's roommate and rival
- Sydney Walsh as Kay Beacon (seasons 1–2), fashion designer, Jane's boss
- John Marshall Jones as Terrence Haggard (season 1), businessman, romantically involved with Rhonda
- Wayne Tippit as Palmer Woodward (seasons 1–3), Amanda's father
- Meg Wittner as Nancy Donner (seasons 1–3), magazine editor, Billy's boss
- Beata Poźniak as Dr. Katya Petrova (season 2), Russian immigrant and intern at Wilshire Memorial Hospital, Matt's wife
- Steven Eckholdt as Robert Wilson (season 2), divorce lawyer, romantically involved with Jane
- Mara Wilson as Nikki Petrova (season 2), Katya's daughter
- Parker Stevenson as Steve McMillan (season 2), entrepreneur and client of D&D Advertising, romantically involved with Jo and Alison
- Melanie Smith (season 2) as Celia Morales, Billy's co-worker
- Gina Gershon as Ellen (season 2), Sydney's co-worker at Shooters who introduced her to Lauren Ethridge
- Kristian Alfonso as Lauren Ethridge (season 2), madam, Sydney's pimp
- Janet Carroll as Marion Shaw (seasons 2, 4–6), Kimberly's domineering mother
- James Wilder as Reed Carter (season 2), ex-convict and father of Jo's baby
- Stanley Kamel as Bruce Teller (seasons 2–3), chief executive at the D&D Advertising Agency
- Jason Beghe (seasons 2–3) as Jeffrey Lindley, closeted U.S. Navy lieutenant, romantically involved with Matt
- Gail Strickland as Katherine Andrews (seasons 2, 5, 7), Jane and Sydney's mother
- Monte Markham and Dorothy Fielding as John Parker and Mrs. Parker (seasons 2–3), Alison's parents
- Linda Gray as Hillary Michaels (season 2), Amanda's mother, from Models Inc.
- Jeff Kaake as Chas Russell (season 2), Hillary's lover
- Cassidy Rae as Sarah Owens (season 2), model, from Models Inc.
- Andrew Williams as Chris Marchette (seasons 2–3), Australian businessman, romantically involved with Jane and obsessed with Sydney
- Tracy Nelson as Meredith Parker (seasons 2–3), Alison's sister
- Kathy Ireland as Brittany Maddocks (season 3), con artist, romantically involved with Jake
- Ken Howard as George Andrews (seasons 3, 5–7), Jane and Sydney's father
- Penny Fuller and Jerry Hardin as Marilyn and Dennis Carter (season 3), Reed's parents
- Cheryl Pollak as Susan Madsen (season 3), Alison's college friend, romantically involved with Billy
- John Saxon as Henry Waxman (season 3), Jo's attorney who defends her from the Carters
- Brian Bloom as Zack Phillips (season 3), drug-addled record executive, romantically involved with Alison
- David James Elliott as Terry Parsons (season 3), alcoholic football player, romantically involved with Alison
- Jasmine Guy as Caitlin Mills (season 3), efficiency expert at D&D Advertising, romantically involved with Peter
- Traci Lords as Rikki Abbott (season 3), Sydney's friend, waitress at Shooters
- Ramy Zada as Martin Abbott (season 3), Rikki's husband, polygamous cult leader
- Francis X. McCarthy as Dr. Calvin Hobbs (seasons 3–4), chief of staff after Peter gets fired
- Tom Schanley as John Rawlings (season 3), police detective who becomes obsessed with Matt
- Dan Cortese as Jess Hanson (seasons 3–4), Jake's brother, romantically involved with Jo
- Perry King as Hayley Armstrong (seasons 3–4), Brooke's father and wealthy businessman, romantically involved with Alison
- David Beecroft as Dr. Paul Graham (seasons 3–4), romantically involved with Matt
- Dana Sparks as Carol Graham (season 3), Paul's wife
- Zitto Kazann as Henry (seasons 3–4), demonic entity who appears in Kimberly's visions
- Morgan Brittany as MacKenzie Hart (seasons 3–4), Richard's wife, who dies in the apartment bombing
- Anne-Marie Johnson as Alycia Barnett (season 4), lawyer, romantically involved with Peter
- Hudson Leick as Shelly Hanson (season 4), Jess' ex-wife, romantically involved with Jake
- Antonio Sabàto Jr. as Jack Parezi (season 4), Amanda's ex-husband
- Morgan Stevens as Nick Diamond (season 4), Jack's attorney
- John Enos III as Bobby Parezi (season 4), Jack's brother, romantically involved with Amanda
- Page Moseley as Vic Munson (season 4), serial killer, kidnaps Kimberly
- Lonnie Schuyler as Alan Ross (season 4), closeted actor, romantically involved with Matt
- Rob Youngblood as Dave Erickson (season 4), Matt's friend, also gay
- Michael Des Barres as Arthur Field (seasons 4–5), chairman of the board of D&D Advertising, Craig's father
- Loni Anderson and Denise Richards as Teri and Brandi Carson (season 4), conniving mother-and-daughter involved with Michael
- Brad Johnson as Dr. Dominick O'Malley (season 4), romantically involved with Jo
- Priscilla Presley as Nurse Benson (season 4), who helps Peter escape Willowbridge Mental Institution
- Dey Young as Dr. Irene Schulman (seasons 5–7), neurosurgeon at Wilshire Memorial Hospital, rival of Peter and Michael
- Greg Evigan as Dr. Dan Hathaway (season 5), doctor at a rehabilitation facility, romantically involved with Matt
- Donna Mills as Sherry Larson Doucette (season 5), actress, Jane's biological mother
- Chad Lowe as Carter Gallavan (season 5), billionaire software developer, romantically involved with Sydney
- Phil Morris as Walter (season 5), Carter's bodyguard
- Scott Plank as Nick Reardon (seasons 5–6), Kyle's army buddy
- Stacy Haiduk as Colleen Patterson (season 5), Jake's ex-girlfriend
- Jeremy Lelliott as David Patterson (season 5), Jake and Colleen's son
- Katie Wright as Chelsea Fielding (seasons 5–6), Matt's 16-year old niece
- Markus Flanagan as Harry Dean (season 5), sleazy attorney and scammer
- Tony Denison as Jim Reilly (season 5), Samantha's abusive ex-con father
- Nancy Lee Grahn as Denise Fielding (season 5), Matt's sister-in-law and Chelsea's mother
- Jeffrey Nordling as Eric Baines (season 5), businessman who pursues Amanda and Megan
- Megan Ward as Connie Rexroth (season 6), Samantha's art school friend who is secretly in love with her
- Tracy Fraim as Bob Matthews (season 6), victim of Lexi's hit-and-run accident
- Susan Walters as Tiffany Hart (season 6), woman who impersonates Kyle's first love Christine Denton
- Dan Gauthier as Jeff Baylor (seasons 6–7), minor-league baseball player who has an affair with Samantha
- Mark L. Taylor as Dr. Louis Visconti (seasons 5–7), psychiatrist at Wilshire Memorial Hospital
- James Farentino as Mr. Beck (season 7), mobster and friend of Peter's
- Steve Wilder as Alex Bastian (season 7), fashion designer and old flame of Jane's
- Rodney Eastman as Rikki G. (season 7), member of Kyle's band, drug dealer
- Stephanie Cameron as Nurse Audrey Williams (season 7), nurse who sues Michael for sexual harassment
- Alexandra Paul as Terry O'Brien (season 7), Ryan's sister-in-law
- Chea Courtney as Sarah McBride (season 7), daughter of Ryan and his first wife Callie
- James Darren as Tony Marlin (season 7), client of Amanda Woodward Advertising
