= Melrose Place season 4 =

Melrose Place
- Season 4
- Starring: Josie Bissett Thomas Calabro Marcia Cross Kristin Davis Laura Leighton Doug Savant Grant Show Andrew Shue Courtney Thorne-Smith Jack Wagner Daphne Zuniga Special guest star: Heather Locklear as Amanda
- No. of episodes: 34

Release
- Original network: Fox
- Original release: September 11, 1995 – May 20, 1996

Season chronology
- ← Previous; Season 3 Next → Season 5

The fourth season of Melrose Place, an American television series, premiered on Fox on September 11, 1995. The season four finale aired on May 20, 1996, after 34 episodes.

The season was produced by Chip Hayes and Kimberly Costello, co-producers Dee Johnson and Allison Robinson, co-executive producers Carol Mendelsohn and Charles Pratt Jr., and executive producers Aaron Spelling, E. Duke Vincent and Frank South.

This is the first season without the involvement of creator Darren Star, who left the series for Central Park West on CBS.

The season was released on DVD as an eight-disc box set under the title of Melrose Place - The Complete Fourth Season on April 15, 2008, by Paramount Home Video. It was the last season to be released as a single-volume DVD box set.

== Storylines ==
Kimberly sets off a series of explosions which destroy half the Melrose apartment complex. Surprisingly, only Jane's potential new boss (Richard Hart's ex-wife Mackenzie Hart) is killed, and Alison is temporarily blinded. Peter and Michael join in a private practice, Mancini-Burns, at Wilshire Hospital.

Jess' death in the fall at the construction site leaves Jake plagued by guilt. He sleeps with Shelly Hanson (Hudson Leick), Jess' ex-wife (in town for his funeral), and hires her at Shooters. She plans to ruin Jake financially as revenge for what she sees as Jake killing her ex-husband. Jake sees the light after she tries to murder him, and she is arrested.

Matt is exonerated of Paul's wife's murder when Paul makes a deathbed confession after he is shot by the police. But Matt's boss, Calvin Hobbs (Francis McCarthy)—the Wilshire chief-of-staff who replaced Peter—fires him anyway for his inappropriate relationship with Paul. Matt wins another sexual discrimination lawsuit after his attorney goads Hobbs into making homophobic statements in court. Matt uses the settlement to enroll in medical school, and works at Wilshire Hospital as an intern.

Kimberly is declared legally insane after the bombing and institutionalized. Peter cares for her, telling Sydney that his concern stems from the memory of his late sister (who had similar mental problems). Kimberly says she was encouraged in violence by a man named Henry; her mother recalls Henry, the family gardener whom Kimberly stabbed to death as a child when he tried to rape her mother. Kimberly is released to Peter, but is lonely when he begins to rekindle his romance with Amanda.

Her eyesight regained, Alison returns to D & D Advertising and marries Brooke's father, Hayley (Perry King); Brooke and Hayley interfere with each other's marriages. Discovering he is financially ruined, during a trip with Alison, Hayley drowns in a drunken fall from his yacht. Brooke and Billy's marriage is rocky due to her jealousy, dishonesty and cruelty. They reconcile after Brooke's suicide attempt, but Billy leaves her for good. A drunken Brooke slips, hits her head on the edge of the Melrose Place pool and drowns. Haunted by her death, Billy tries to keep her memory alive. Soon, he resorts to unethical decisions while at D&D, including sleeping with clients, though later realizes the error of his ways.

Amanda admits faking her death years ago in Miami to escape her violent husband, Jack Parezi (Antonio Sabato Jr.)—a businessman with Mafia connections—who tracks her to L.A. and dies in an accident. She ends her relationship with Peter when she is reunited with her long-lost first love, Jack's brother Bobby (John Enos III). Peter gets involved with Alycia Barnett (Anne-Marie Johnson), Matt's lawyer in the Paul Graham case, and they conspire to ruin Bobby so Alycia can control his cable-TV empire; Peter hopes to win Amanda back. When Bobby discovers the plot, he attacks Alycia at Peter's office and she accidentally knocks him out the high-rise window to his death. Peter is arrested for the death, and Alycia dies in a car accident when she tries to leave town.

Kimberly and Michael remarry, but she develops multiple-personality disorder and often reverts to a violent 1950s housewife named Betsy Jones. When she drives with Peter to the police station to provide his alibi for Bobby's death, Kimberly (as Betsy) instead commits him to a mental institution to avenge his declaring her insane.

Jo gets involved with Richard Hart after breaking up with Jake, creating a rift between her and Jane. Jane pretends to seduce Michael to make Richard jealous; this infuriates Sydney, who spikes Jane's drink with prescription pills which cause a paralyzing stroke. Jake begins a relationship with Jane as she recovered, but after Richard savagely beats and rapes her during a business trip to New York she breaks up with Jake in her determination to harm Richard.

Matt, in medical school classes and interning at Wilshire, begins a romance with closeted film actor Alan Ross (Lonnie Schuyler). Alan lies publicly about his sexual orientation, fearing that revealing his homosexuality would blacklist him in Hollywood. Behind Alan's back Matt begins a short-lived relationship with David (Rob Youngblood), who took his old social-services job at Wilshire Hospital, but feels guilty about cheating on Alan. He breaks up with Alan after he enters a lavender marriage with co-star Valerie Madison (Jeri Ryan) as a publicity move. When Matt contracts meningitis from a patient he becomes addicted to painkillers, stealing pills from the hospital's stores.

Jo begins a relationship with Matt's medical-school professor Dominick O'Malley (Brad Johnson), who helps her care for Matt and deal with Sydney's school friend in a spousal-abuse case. When Dominick invites her to join him in Bosnia as part of a Doctors Without Borders program, she hesitates at first but eventually agrees. Amanda and Michael try to rescue Peter from "Betsy" at the mental institution. Kimberly returns to reality before falling from a scaffold; comatose, she leaves Peter again in jail with no alibi for Bobby's murder. Although Billy asks Jake to help reunite him with Alison, Jake and Alison begin a relationship of their own.

In the season finale, Jane discovers that Sydney is responsible for her stroke and blackmails her into helping her murder Richard. Sydney apparently kills Richard with a shovel, and the sisters bury him in a field. In the final scene, however, Richard's hand pops out of the ground while Jane and Sydney speed off in their car.

== Cast ==
=== Main cast members ===
In alphabetical order

- Josie Bissett as Jane Mancini
- Thomas Calabro as Michael Mancini
- Marcia Cross as Kimberly Shaw
- Kristin Davis as Brooke Armstrong (episodes 1–22)
- Laura Leighton as Sydney Andrews
- Doug Savant as Matt Fielding
- Grant Show as Jake Hanson
- Andrew Shue as Billy Campbell
- Courtney Thorne-Smith as Alison Parker
- Jack Wagner as Peter Burns
- Daphne Zuniga as Jo Reynolds

=== Special guest star ===
- Heather Locklear as Amanda Woodward

=== Recurring guest stars ===
- Perry King as Hayley Armstrong
- Patrick Muldoon as Richard Hart
- Morgan Brittany as MacKenzie Hart
- Anne-Marie Johnson as Alycia Barnett
- James Handy as Matt Fielding Sr.
- Claudette Nevins as Constance Fielding
- David Beecroft as Dr. Paul Graham
- Francis Xavier McCarthy as Dr. Calvin Hobbs
- Zitto Kazann as Henry
- Hudson Leick as Shelly Hanson
- Antonio Sabàto Jr. as Jack Parezi
- Janet Carroll as Marion Shaw
- John McCann as Walter Kovacs
- Morgan Stevens as Nick Diamond
- Dr. Joyce Brothers as herself
- Jan Hoag as Nurse Kelly
- John Enos III as Bobby Parezi
- David Groh as Vince Parezi
- Page Moseley as Vic Munson
- Lonnie Schuyler as Alan Ross
- Danny Darst as Monty
- Selma Archerd as Nurse Amy
- Richard Molnar as Guy
- Belita Moreno as Gloria Bryan
- Rob Youngblood as Dave Erickson
- Michael Des Barres as Arthur Field
- Loni Anderson as Teri Carson
- Denise Richards as Brandi Carson
- Justine Priestley as Laurie
- Robert Bishop as Tyler
- Brad Johnson as Dr. Dominick O'Malley
- Nigel Gibbs as Detective Wylie
- Michael Shamus Wiles as Dave
- Leland Crooke as Louie
- Garrett Warren as Ziggy
- Lynn Chalmers as Nurse Lynn
- Priscilla Presley as Nurse Benson
- Brooke Langton as Samantha Reilly
- Paul Perri as Andy
- Neill Barry as Greg Parker

== Episodes ==
No. overall	No. in season	Title	Directed by	Written by	Original release date	Prod. code	U.S. viewers (millions)
97	1	"Postmortem Madness"	Charles Correll	Frank South	September 11, 1995	2395094	16.0
Kimberly sets off her bombs, destroying half of the building. MacKenzie suffers a fatal heart attack. Billy breaks down Alison's door and pulls her to safety, although she is blinded by the blast. Peter assists Kimberly from drowning after the impact knocks her into the pool. Kimberly is placed in the psychiatric ward, and is unable to recall the events of the past week. Billy storms out when his father in law Hayley calls him to task for not immediately taking Brooke on their honeymoon. Brooke later moves out of the mansion and into Billy's apartment. Jess is killed in the fall from the construction site, while Jake suffers only minor injuries. He shuns a guilt-ridden Jo. The jailed Matt is enraged when his parents seem to suspect that he is guilty of murder. They win back his trust when they put up their mortgage to bail him out of jail. Marcia Cross, Kristin Davis and Jack Wagner are made series regulars.
98	2	"Melrose Is Like a Box of Chocolates"	Charles Correll	Carol Mendelsohn	September 18, 1995	2395095	12.4
Jane, Sydney and Jo get temporary roommates while the building is repaired. Sydney takes the couch while Amanda gets the bedroom. Jake goes on a drinking binge in the aftermath of his brother's death. Amanda invites Alison to return to D&D. Peter encourages Kimberly to pretend to be insane to get a lighter sentence, but she refuses. Kimberly attacks a doctor during a psychiatric evaluation, and threatens to jump off the roof. Peter is able to talk her down with a love declaration (although he isn't sincere). Michael and Peter decide to establish their own practice. Brooke is distressed when an inheritance isn't all that she expected. Sydney quits Shooters because of Jake's self-destructive behavior, and is hired as Michael and Peter's receptionist. Matt gets into a fist fight with Paul at the hospital. He later punches out Jake after taking exception to his treatment of Jo. Jake finally breaks down and turns to Jo for comfort. Jane undermines Richard's authority at work.
99	3	"Blind Ambition"	Victoria Hochberg	Dee Johnson	September 20, 1995	2395096	14.7
Alison regains her sight during a client party. Jane convinces her to keep the news to herself, as Brooke is only allowing her near Billy out of pity. Brooke snoops in Amanda's office and discovers a Florida driver's license for Amanda Parezi. Matt's lawyer, Alycia, resigns when he insists on trying to coax a confession from Paul on his own. Paul believes that Matt has an incriminating letter from Carol, and asks him to come to his house. Paul holds Matt at gunpoint and plans to kill him. Fortunately, Jo has called Alycia, who arrives with the police. Paul is mortally wounded in a shootout and confesses to his wife's murder before dying. Matt returns to work, only to be fired by Dr. Hobbs. Peter again asks Kimberly to plead insanity. He is impressed when she lunges for Michael and Sydney in the courtroom, until he realizes that her behavior is not an act. Richard objects when Jane hires Jo without consulting him. Jake and Jo finally get back together. Jake receives a surprise visit from Jess's ex-wife, Shelly.
100	4	"Simply Shocking"	Richard Lang	Charles Pratt, Jr.	September 25, 1995	2395097	13.8
In Miami, Brooke meets Amanda’s ex-husband Jack and learns that she faked her own death, and then uses the information to blackmail Amanda into giving her a raise and demoting Alison. Alison tells Amanda and Billy that she has regained her sight. Kimberly begins shock therapy after continuing to see her demon. Michael sleeps with Sydney and the couple visits Kimberly, prompting another psychotic episode. After Michael reveals to Sydney that he used her to intentionally provoke Kimberly, Sydney nearly quits as receptionist, only to be convinced by Peter to stay and spy on Michael. Richard proposes to Jane, who accepts. Later, Jane is fired by Richard after taking credit for the designs at the spring show, but he later hires her back as the head of the new Hart-Mancini Designs. After Michael overhears Dr. Hobbs use a homophobic epithet while discussing Matt’s firing, Matt decides to take legal action against the hospital. Jake tells Shelly how Jess died and hires her as a bookkeeper.
101	5	"Drawing Henry"	Charles Correll	Allison Robbins	October 2, 1995	2395098	14.0
Jack arrives in Los Angeles and tricks Brooke into confirming that Amanda is alive and employed at D&D. At the airport, Jack thwarts Amanda’s departure and asks for a divorce so he can legally remarry. Kimberly’s demon is revealed to be a family gardener whom Kimberly had murdered as a child while he beat and tried to rape her mother. Richard asks Jo to encourage Jane to focus more on her engagement. Jane begins to wear her engagement ring in public but confides to Jo that the love she feels for Richard is different than previous relationships. Jo grows suspicious about Jake’s relationship with Shelly, leading Jake to ask Shelly to move out. Over dinner, Hayley asks Alison to help him break up Billy and Brooke and attempts to kiss her as she leaves. Dr. Hobbs, Michael, and Peter are served with subpoenas related to Matt’s firing. Later, Matt refuses a settlement offer from Hobbs.
102	6	"The Jane Mutiny"	Scott Paulin	Kimberly Costello	October 9, 1995	2395099	13.4
Brooke bluffs that she is negotiating a deal to bring on her father’s firm as an account at D&D. When Hayley eventually signs with D&D, he angers Brooke by choosing Alison as his account representative, and Billy tells Brooke to stop focusing on her father. After Kimberly is released from the psychiatric hospital, Michael and Sydney scheme to get her sent back, while Peter takes her in. Jack and Amanda settle the terms of their divorce. Later, Amanda tells Billy that Jack used to beat her, while Jack tells Amanda that their relationship is not over after she refuses to spend time with him. After a drunken Jo tells Richard that Jane doesn’t love him, Richard walks out on Jane. Hobbs is fired after launching into a homophobic rant at his deposition, and Matt is given the choice between returning to his job or receiving a financial settlement.
103	7	"Let The Games Begin"	Chip Chalmers	Stevie Stern	October 16, 1995	2395100	13.3
Brooke signs Jack as a D&D client over Amanda’s objections. Amanda discloses more about her relationship with Jack and warns Billy to stay away. After Billy shares the details with Peter, Amanda rejects Peter’s offer to keep Jack away. Later, Jack reveals he has no fiancee and only wants to be married to Amanda. At Amanda’s “We Survived the Blast of ’95” party, Kimberly apologizes to the residents for the bombing but suffers a setback when she sees her demon in the laundry room who, unbeknownst to her, is a paid actor hired by Michael and Sydney. After hearing Kimberly call in to Dr. Joyce Brothers' radio show to describe her problems, Michael and Sydney decide to increase their scheming. Jane apologizes to Richard, who asks to keep their relationship strictly business and forms his own menswear company. After arguing over Matt’s career, Matt’s father suffers a fatal heart attack and tells Matt to follow his dreams. Alison and Hayley continue their relationship, and after Brooke confronts Alison, Hayley tells Alison not to let Brooke get in the way. Jake and Jo bicker over not spending enough time together and Shelly’s unsuccessful attempt to seduce Jake.
104	8	"Dial M For Melrose"	Richard Lang	Chip Hayes	October 23, 1995	2395101	13.4
Jack is seriously injured in a fall while chasing Amanda. At the hospital, Peter oversees medical care for Jack and lies about the injuries to Jack’s attorney, who retains Michael for a second opinion. Later, Michael confronts Amanda but agrees to lie about Jack’s injuries after Amanda discloses Jack's abuse. Kimberly sees her demon outside and, discovering footprints, realizes that the demon is not in her mind. She later confronts the “demon”, and he confesses that he was a paid actor hired by Michael and Sydney. After Sydney tells Kimberly that Peter loves Amanda, Kimberly violates the terms of her release by visiting the complex and finding Peter and Amanda together. Alison and Hayley announce their relationship to Brooke and Billy and decide to move in together. Jo and Jake work on their relationship. Matt consoles his mother after his father’s funeral.
105	9	"Amanda Unplugged"	Charles Correll	James Kahn	October 30, 1995	2395102	14.2
Jack’s lawyer threatens Amanda into cooperating, while Michael discloses the situation to Sydney. Peter and a drunken Amanda sleep together. Sydney secretly records Peter and Amanda as they discuss Jack, and later, she walks in on Amanda as Jack flatlines. When Jane books a trip to Hawaii, Richard makes it strictly business and invites Jo. Later, Richard fabricates a story to draw Jane to New York. After Jane tells Jake that Jo and Richard are traveling alone, he makes out with Shelly and gets walked in on by Jo who, unbeknownst to him, cancelled the trip with Richard. Brooke tells Billy that she is pregnant after secretly having sex without her diaphragm. Kimberly thanks Michael and Sydney for allowing her to regain her sanity and later breaks her tracking monitor to guest host Dr. Joyce Brothers’ radio show. After Sydney reprimands Michael for insulting Matt, Michael changes Matt’s medical school entrance exam score to a passing grade. Hayley reveals that his previous marriage was a loveless shotgun marriage after finding Alison snooping through his late wife’s belongings.
106	10	"El Syd"	Chip Chalmers	Charles Pratt, Jr.	November 6, 1995	2395103	14.5
When Jack dies, Sydney blackmails Amanda into receiving half of Jack’s inheritance. After Jack’s autopsy reveals that he died from the fall, Amanda refuses his inheritance in exchange for keeping the autopsy sealed. Having been played by Amanda, Sydney blackmails Michael into moving back into the beach house. After Hayley proposes, Jake suggests that Alison test her feelings for Billy. When Alison and Billy’s charter plane makes an emergency landing en route to Santa Barbara, Alison attempts to discuss her feelings with Billy, who shares the news of Brooke’s pregnancy and rejects her. Upon return, Alison accepts Hayley’s second marriage proposal and the couple is married in Mexico. Jo surprises Richard in Hawaii, where he avoids Jane’s phone apologies. Kimberly fights with Peter over her radio show and later moves into Sydney’s former apartment, where she sees Peter visit Amanda. As Matt celebrates his readmission to medical school, a drunken Michael tells Matt that he changed his exam score.
107	11	"Free Kimmy"	Charles Correll	Carol Mendelsohn	November 13, 1995	2395104	13.4
Kimberly agrees to sever her medical relationship with Peter in exchange for removing her tracking monitor. Later, she sleeps with the pool boy. When Sydney attempts to blackmail Peter into giving Michael a bigger share of the partnership, Peter responds by telling Michael he’ll end their partnership if Sydney doesn’t destroy her tape. Michael destroys Sydney’s tape but says she can stay at the beach house. Amanda rejects Peter’s advances. In Miami, Jack’s brother Bobby is instructed to kill Amanda. Jane punches Jo and has dinner with Michael to make Richard jealous. Hayley allays Alison’s frustrations by promising not to keep secrets about his business. Jake hires Matt as a waiter at Shooters. Later, Jake and Matt realize that Shelly has password-protected Shooters’ new computer accounting system.
108	12	"Kimberly Does L.A."	Thomas Calabro	Dee Johnson	November 20, 1995	2395105	13.4
Kimberly meets a man named Vic who, unbeknownst to her, begins anonymously calling into her radio show and harassing her. Later, Kimberly leaves Shooters with Vic, who comes forward as the caller and ties her to a bed frame. After being told by Matt that Shooters’ bank account balance is lower than expected, Jake goes to the bank and realizes Shelly has been embezzling money. After avoiding him, Amanda opens up to Peter about the man she loved before Jack. Later, Bobby shows up at her doorstep. Jane invites Michael to spend the night and kicks him out just in time for Richard and Jo to see him as he leaves. Meanwhile, Sydney and Jo grow suspicious of Jane and Michael. Hayley wakes Alison in the middle of the night to leave for a second honeymoon. Brooke and Billy move into Alison’s former apartment.
109	13	"Hook, Line and Hayley"	Charles Correll	Frank South	November 27, 1995	2395106	12.9
Peter grows suspicious as Amanda and Bobby reconnect, but Amanda and Peter later reaffirm their commitment to each other as Bobby watches from afar. After revealing to Alison that he is fleeing the country due to financial trouble, Hayley falls overboard from his yacht and fatally drowns. Kimberly escapes from Vic and turns him in to the police. Later, Peter agrees to help approve Kimberly’s psychiatry internship. The police seek a court order to open Shelly’s safe deposit box, but Shelly tells Jake she buried the money. Jane continues her relationship with Michael. Richard announces he’s dissolving Hart-Mancini Designs to launch his own firm, which he asks Jo to join. Doug Savant does not appear in this episode.
110	14	"Two Flew Over the Cuckoo's Nest"	Janet Greek	Allison Robbins	December 4, 1995	2395107	14.3
At the reading of Hayley’s will, Alison learns that she unwittingly signed divorce papers the week before and will not receive any of Hayley’s estate, which will instead go to Brooke’s unborn child. Later, at a conference in Santa Barbara, Alison mistakes another man for Hayley, prompting a drinking binge. When Billy hears that Alison is unreachable, he goes to Santa Barbara and consoles her. Bobby cancels his company’s contract with D&D and Amanda tells him they can only be friends. Elsewhere, Bobby donates $1 million to the hospital’s pediatric AIDS wing and is questioned by the FBI. At dinner, Richard fails to tell Jane about his business plans. Kimberly begins seeing Sydney as a patient and advises her to push Jane and Michael together so they grow sick of each other. Matt asks out a patient named Alan. Jake sees a loan shark after running into financial trouble.
111	15	"Oy! To the World"	Chip Chalmers	Kimberly Costello	December 11, 1995	2395108	12.9
After reconciling with Jane, Jo prevents Richard from telling Jane about his business plans, only for Jane to find the dissolution papers in Richard’s files. Kimberly tells Sydney that Michael seeks prestige and arranges for her to organize the charity Christmas party while also writing her a prescription for sedatives. At the party, a jealous Sydney spikes Jane’s drink with the sedatives, causing Jane to lose consciousness just as she gets in bed with Michael. Billy lies to Brooke and says he slept with Alison. Later, he tells Alison that he won’t let his guilt about her ruin his relationship with Brooke and severs ties with her. Brooke purchases a house for her growing family, only to learn that her pregnancy test was a false positive. After the FBI warns Amanda to stay away from Bobby, she decides not to be pushed around and re-signs Bobby’s company with D&D, angering Peter. Amanda warns Bobby to get along with Peter or lose her friendship. Matt and Alan enjoy a date.
112	16	"Holy Strokes"	James Darren	Charles Pratt, Jr.	January 1, 1996	2395109	12.4
Brooke lies to Billy and says she had a miscarriage, and then tries to convince Billy that they should try again. After a hospital nurse tells Billy the truth about Brooke’s pregnancy, Billy berates Brooke and declares their marriage over, only to return home and find that Brooke has attempted suicide. After Sydney confesses to Kimberly that she spiked Jane’s drink, Kimberly gives Sydney pills to make up for the ones that she gave Jane. Meanwhile, Jane is left partially paralyzed after a stroke caused by the sedatives, and she later moves into the beach house with Michael and Sydney for her recovery. Peter is angered after Bobby kisses Amanda on New Year’s Eve and later settles a malpractice suit on Peter's behalf. Matt convinces Alan to move in with him instead of moving to New York. Daphne Zuniga does not appear in this episode.
113	17	"The Brooke Stops Here"	Charles Correll	James Kahn	January 8, 1996	2395110	14.3
When Sydney feels that others suspect her of drugging Jane, she plants sedatives in Richard’s office on the advice of Kimberly. Later, Jo finds the sedatives and the police tell Sydney they need more evidence to charge Richard. Michael moves out of the beach house after he tries to sleep with Jane and she admits she was faking her affection for him. Billy pressures Amanda into rehiring Brooke at D&D, who immediately begins to cause headaches in the office. Elsewhere, Billy cruelly tells Alison to stay away from him, accusing her of causing Brooke's suicide attempt, and Brooke begins to emotionally manipulate Billy. Peter tells Bobby to stay away from Amanda, but when Bobby visits Amanda to tell her to choose Peter, they end up having sex. Alan and Matt come clean about their pasts. Jake is forced to collect money for his loan shark, which catches the ears of Bobby.
114	18	"Sydney, Bothered and Bewildered"	Chip Chalmers	Stevie Stern	January 15, 1996	2395111	13.6
With Peter and Sydney both wanting Michael to move back into the beach house, they agree to split the cost of putting Jane in a nursing home. However, when Sydney drops off Jane, Jane refuses to sign her admission papers. When Sydney dumps Jane on the beach to get her out of the house, Jane gets pulled into the ocean but is rescued by Jake. Amanda tells Peter that she loves Bobby, and Bobby tells Peter to stay away. Later, Peter attempts to ask out Bobby’s lawyer, Alycia Barnett. Alison offers to help Brooke, angering Billy, who tells her not to play into Brooke’s game. Later, after Brooke trashes Alison’s apartment, Alison asks Billy not to admonish Brooke. Billy walks out on Brooke after another tantrum. Richard walks out on Jo after she asks him about the sedatives, but they later reconcile. Matt tells Alan he’ll work on balancing his school work and their relationship. Bobby anonymously assumes legal control of Monty’s loan to Jake.
115	19	"The Bobby Trap"	Frank South	Frank South	January 22, 1996	2395112	13.7
Bobby refuses Peter’s assistance with his cable company’s financial issues, but Peter meets one-on-one with Alycia to discuss a mutually beneficial arrangement. During a weekend getaway, Bobby is called away from dinner and tells Amanda to stay put. Defying Bobby’s orders, Amanda returns to her hotel room and finds both herself and Bobby held at gunpoint by Bobby’s father. Sydney unsuccessfully tries to convince Michael to move back in to the beach house, but he later kicks her out and she moves in with Kimberly. Michael gives Kimberly a truth serum, and she both confesses her love for Michael and admits that Sydney drugged Jane. Later, Michael asks Kimberly to move in with him, but she says his drugging killed any chance that they had together. Jane tells Richard and Jo that she’s leaving Hart-Mancini Designs, but Richard tells her to take legal action instead. Jane and Jake make out in the pool. Alison asks Billy to consider marriage counseling on Brooke’s behalf, but he refuses. Later, Billy serves Brooke with divorce papers and kicks her out of the apartment. Matt is upset after Alan introduces him as a “friend” to his producer. Elsewhere, Matt meets David, his replacement in Social Services, who also happens to be gay.
116	20	"No Lifeguard on Duty"	Richard Lang	Dee Johnson & Carol Mendelsohn	February 5, 1996	2395113A	16.5
117	21	"No Lifeguard on Duty"	Richard Lang	Dee Johnson & Carol Mendelsohn	February 5, 1996	2395113B	16.5
Bobby’s father renounces Bobby and then releases him and Amanda. Peter eavesdrops a conversation about Bobby’s financial troubles stemming from Mr. Parezi’s sale of shares in the cable company. After some initial reluctance, Bobby allows Amanda to purchase shares in the cable company. Peter pays Sydney to seduce Bobby at an upcoming fundraiser, but Bobby rejects her advances. Alison offers to act as a liaison between Billy and Brooke. After seeing Alison and Billy together at Shooters, Brooke tries to ask out her ex-fiancee, Lowell, who says she’s nothing without her father’s money. Kimberly visits Vic in jail, who says he’ll get revenge. Michael later shares that Vic has been sentenced to 15 years without parole. Jane and Jo feud after Jake rents his garage out for Jane’s design business, kicking out Jo’s car. David tells Matt he’d be suspicious of Alan playing a straight character, but the couple later shares that they love each other. After finding Brooke living in her car, Alison lets Brooke move into her apartment, but kicks her out when Billy makes Alison choose between him or Brooke. Later, a drunken Brooke confronts Billy and Alison in the courtyard, and after they leave, falls into the pool and knocks herself unconscious on the pool deck. Amanda tells Alycia that she never trusted Peter’s motives. Sydney confesses to Bobby that Peter paid her to flirt with him. When Alycia tells Bobby that she has a date with Peter, he sends her to Palm Springs and threatens Peter to stay away. When Vic escapes from jail and holds Kimberly at knifepoint behind the wheel, Michael gives chase and rescues Kimberly. At the beach house, Michael and Kimberly sleep together. Matt and Alan continues to have troubles after Alan tells an interviewer that he’s single. Alan grows suspicious of David at a dance fundraiser and angers the network when he’s photographed dancing with Matt. Jo and Richard argue about not spending enough time together. Jake and Jane sleep together at Shooters.
118	22	"Devil in a Wet Dress"	Chip Hayes	Kimberly Costello	February 12, 1996	2395114	14.9
Brooke is declared dead, but Billy finds himself tormented by her ghost. When Billy tells Alison that she belongs with him, Alison tells him to grieve for Brooke. Alycia submits her resignation as Bobby’s lawyer, but Bobby rejects it and promises to keep out of her relationship with Peter. At a tense dinner, Peter tells Amanda that he loves Alycia. Later, Alycia catches Peter going through her legal files on Bobby, but pretends not to notice. When Sydney kicks Kimberly out of the apartment, she looks for a new place to live and finds herself outbid on a house by Michael, who convinces her to move into the beach house with him. Alan’s producer tells Matt to keep his relationship with Alan private. Later, Matt grows suspicious of Alan’s dinner with his female co-star until she comes out to Matt as gay. Jane confronts Richard after he steals one of her clients. Final appearance of Kristin Davis as Brooke Armstrong.
119	23	"The Circle of Strife"	Janet Greek	Allison Robbins	February 19, 1996	2395115	13.8
Kimberly convinces Michael to fire Sydney, but it backfires when Sydney sues for sexual harassment and receives 10% of the partnership as a settlement. After some hesitation, Kimberly and Michael renew their wedding vows. Jo accidentally takes Jane’s design sketches from her apartment, and Jane confronts Richard after seeing her designs on his mannequins. Jo realizes her mistake, but Richard lies and says that he drew the designs. Peter gives Alycia a false story to explain his desire for revenge on Bobby. Amanda joins the board of directors for Bobby’s cable company. Alycia and Peter set Bobby up by backdating checks to the chair of the Senate cable committee and paying off a photographer to capture Bobby and the senator shaking hands at a fundraiser. Elsewhere, Amanda finds Bobby’s loan to Jake and confronts Bobby, who says he wants to help other people do things the right way. Alison becomes frustrated after Billy sets her up in a pitch meeting with an ice cream company. Later, he publicly asks Alison to move in with him. Alan becomes frustrated with Matt and David’s friendship, and later tells Matt that his producer wants him to marry his female co-star.
120	24	"Run, Billy, Run"	Charles Correll	Charles Pratt, Jr.	February 26, 1996	2395116	14.0
After learning that Amanda has invested in Bobby’s cable company, Peter attempts to bury the corruption story but to no avail. After the story breaks, Peter whisks Amanda away from the media and introduces her to a member of the cable commission, who asks her to testify. Later, after walking in on Peter comforting Amanda, Alycia blackmails him into giving her the entire cable company and continuing their relationship. Peter tells Amanda that he always loved her and Alycia orchestrated the news leaks. Billy lands an account with Midline Airways after sleeping with someone from the rival ad agency to learn about and undercut the rival’s pitch. Alison is disturbed by Billy’s salary raise and lack of ethics, and she rejects his invitation to celebrate. Despite help from Alison and Jo, Jane decides against debuting her fashion line. Later, while attending Richard’s tropical-themed fashion show (complete with a working volcano), Jane is angered by seeing her designs and intentionally sets off the building’s sprinkler system. Kimberly begins to suffer flashbacks and fainting spells. Matt is frustrated by Alan’s extravagant wedding and honeymoon plans.
121	25	"Ruthless People"	Richard Lang	Dee Johnson	March 4, 1996	2395117	13.3
Increasingly frustrated by the wedding and the arrival of Alan’s parents, Matt sleeps with David. After Matt expresses his guilt, David anonymously calls Alan and says that Matt cheated. During the wedding, Matt walks out on Alan. When Alison and Billy are tasked with signing Midnight Sun Vodka, Billy takes the client to a strip club. Alison grows more frustrated with Billy after he volunteers her to mud wrestle with the client. Amanda also becomes frustrated with Billy’s arrogance but changes her tune after Billy signs Midnight Sun Vodka and doubles another account’s ad budget. Kimberly begins assuming the personality of 1950s housewife Betsy, who attends Tupperware parties and is disgusted by Michael’s lust and sexual fantasies. During a visit, Peter notices Kimberly’s bizarre behavior. Later, “Betsy” locks herself in the bathroom. Richard fires his staff after learning that some of them helped Jane. He later apologizes to Jo, but says they need time apart. When Jo finds that her pictures captured Jane setting off the sprinklers, she blackmails Jane into hiring Richard as a consultant. Amanda sells her shares in the cable company and thanks Peter for his help. Alycia tells Bobby that the charges have been dropped and he is now broke. When Bobby finds Peter at Amanda’s apartment, he pushes Peter down the stairs.
122	26	"The Burning Couch"	Anson Williams	Kimberly Costello	March 11, 1996	2395118	13.0
After Bobby is arrested for Peter’s assault, Sydney bails him out and Peter agrees to drop the charges. Alycia tells Peter she’ll end her blackmail campaign for $2 million, and Peter convinces the Midnight Sun Vodka CEO to invest $2 million in the cable company, thereby ending his relationship with Alycia. Later, Amanda questions Sydney’s involvement with Bobby and rebuffs Peter’s attempts at reconciliation. At D&D, Alison continues to press Billy on his behavior. Kimberly apologizes to Michael for the night before. “Betsy” burns the living room couch after Michael and Kimberly have sex on it. Kimberly tells Peter about “Betsy,” who writes her a prescription. Later, “Betsy” nearly cuts off Michael’s genitals before he wakes up. Jo shows Jake the photo of Jane setting off the sprinkler, leading him to break up with her and sleep with a woman named Claire. Later, Jane comes clean to Jake and they reconcile, only to introduce her new assistant: Claire. David suggests that Matt out Alan to the tabloids, and Matt confronts David when such a story is printed, but Alan shows up on Matt’s doorstep to share that he outed himself.
123	27	"Triumph of the Bill"	Janet Greek	James Kahn	March 18, 1996	2395119	12.9
Defying D&D board chairman Arthur Field, Amanda assigns a conference keynote on ethics to Alison. At the conference, Billy meets an ad agent who has suspiciously signed Julie Newmar to a commercial campaign. When Alison shares that her room adjoins Julie’s, Billy breaks into Julie’s room and finds risqué photos that are being used to blackmail Julie into a contract, which he takes and leaves in Alison’s room. After more pressure from Arthur, Amanda uses the discovery of the photos as an excuse to assign the keynote speech to Billy. Billy signs Julie to a D&D contract and is rewarded by sleeping with Amanda. After Billy’s speech on ethics gets a standing ovation, Alison confronts Amanda and quits D&D. Jake tells Claire, who’s being paid by Richard to seduce Jake, to stay away from him but fails to confess to Jane. When Claire corners Jake into admitting the affair, Jane fires her and feuds with Jake before making amends. Richard confesses to Jo that he stole Jane’s designs. Later, Jake convinces Richard to resume his partnership with Jane. Michael is bewildered by “Betsy’s” low libido but is soon joined in the shower by Kimberly’s newest persona: sex kitten “Rita.” Later, Peter tells Kimberly she must resume her therapy sessions and medication. Bobby moves in with Sydney on a strictly platonic basis. Doug Savant does not appear in this episode.
124	28	"What Comes Up, Must Come Down"	Richard Lang	Allison Robbins	April 1, 1996	2395120	13.3
Kimberly asks Peter to send Michael out of town for some alone time, so Peter takes Michael to judge the Miss Health and Fitness 1996 pageant, where Teri Carson and her contestant daughter Brandi try to ingratiate themselves with the doctors. Peter rejects Teri’s attempts at elevator sex, while Michael sleeps with Brandi on the beach. Brandi places second in the pageant after failing to secure Peter’s vote. Back at home, Michael tells Kimberly that he lost their wedding ring and Teri announces that she’s suing Peter for underage sex with Brandi. Jo befriends Sydney’s college friend Laurie and her son Tyler. As Jo bonds with Tyler, she walks in on Laurie slapping Tyler and later discovers a bruise on Tyler’s shoulder. Amanda tricks Billy into pressuring D&D to renew her contract; once they do, she tells Billy that their sexual relationship is over. After rejecting Laurie’s request to crash for a while, Sydney takes Bobby out drinking and Bobby wakes up the next morning with an arm tattoo. Jane agrees to resume her partnership with Richard. David walks out on a date with Matt, who won’t stop talking about Alan. Alison is hired at Shooters.
125	29	"True Fibs"	Victoria Hochberg	Chip Hayes	April 15, 1996	2395121	11.9
Brandi calls Michael to apologize when Teri takes the phone and threatens to tell Kimberly unless Michael keeps quiet. Amanda tells Peter to stand up for himself, leading him to stop Alycia from settling with Teri and Brandi. Later, Amanda pays Sydney for finding Teri and Brandi’s hotel information, and when she visits the hotel, she overhears Michael telling Brandi to come clean. When “Betsy” stops Kimberly from taking her medication, Kimberly goes to Peter for help, but he is arrested before he can help. With Peter gone, “Betsy” knocks Michael unconscious with a hammer upon arriving home. Laurie explains away Tyler’s bruise to Jo as carelessness. With the help of Matt, Jo is introduced to Dr. Dominick O’Malley, who has researched child abuse and finds no evidence of abuse after meeting with Tyler. When Richard and Jane make a trip to New York, Jake warns Richard to stay away from Jane. In New York, Richard's abusive side surfaces when he beats and rapes Jane in her hotel room and tells her that he'll kill her if she presses charges. Back in Los Angeles, Jane snaps at Jake and struggles to process her trauma. After Billy’s inflated ego leads to a failed pitch to Online Banks, he visits Brooke’s grave to say goodbye and swears off his arrogance. Sydney invests $15,000 in an old friend of Bobby’s turned film producer, only to realize he produces pornographic films.
126	30	"Melrose Unglued"	Charles Pratt, Jr.	Charles Pratt, Jr.	April 29, 1996	2395122	12.2
Kimberly stages a burglary to cover for “Betsy’s” attack on Michael. Amanda tells Peter that she saw Michael and Brandi together, leading Michael to confess the situation to Amanda and Kimberly. Teri and Brandi drop the charges against Peter in exchange for a D&D modeling campaign, and Peter and Amanda resume their relationship. Kimberly tells Michael to move out for his safety and dines with Peter to discuss institutionalization, but “Betsy” escapes the restaurant. Meanwhile, Jimmy tells Sydney that Alycia and Peter set up Bobby, and Sydney shares this information with Bobby. Angered, Bobby tricks Alycia into meeting at Peter’s office, where she swings at him with a golf club and he fatally falls out the window. At the hospital, Peter is confronted by the police when he receives a call from Alycia, who confesses to murdering Bobby. However, before she can confess to the police, Alycia is killed in a head-on car collision. After Jake asks Alison to investigate Jane’s weird behavior, Jane tells Alison that Richard beat and raped her. While Alison refuses to tell Jake about the abuse out of privacy concerns, Jane eventually tells Jake herself, and Jake leaves in a rage. Matt sets up Dominick on a date with Jo in exchange for a TA job, allowing Jo to ask Dominick to re-examine Tyler. Later, Laurie confesses to Dominick and Jo that her ex-boyfriend hit Tyler once, which was her reason for coming to Los Angeles.
127	31	"Peter's Excellent Adventure"	Chip Chalmers	James Kahn	May 6, 1996	2395123	12.3
After Peter is released from police custody, he tells Michael that Kimberly has multiple personality disorder. “Betsy” asks Peter to take her to a mental hospital, but while en route to the police station to corroborate Peter’s alibi, “Betsy” injects Peter with a sedative and admits him to a mental facility: Willowbridge Institute. Michael tells Amanda that Peter is missing, and “Betsy” tells Michael that she never dined with Peter. At Willowbridge, Peter is administered shock therapy and “Betsy” tells him she is seeking revenge for her earlier stay in a mental hospital. Elsewhere, Michael and Amanda find Kimberly in the background of a photo at the restaurant Peter visited; they later find Peter’s belongings in her office. Jane drops her legal case against Richard after the D.A. says she faces a tough prosecution. Subsequently, Jane resumes working with Richard to "help him with his anger issues" and tells Jake to stay away, bewildering Alison and Jake. Jane later visits a shooting range and has visions of Richard abusing her while firing. Alison and Jake bond over their struggles with Billy and Jane. Matt is accidentally pricked with a contaminated needle while dealing with a problematic patient. Jo and Dominick have a spat after Dominick denigrates women who give up their children.
128	32	"Full Metal Betsy"	Frank South	Frank South	May 15, 1996	2395124	12.3
Peter flirts with Nurse Benson and asks to switch to oral medication. Amanda locates Kimberly by calling the bank and asking for the location of her last ATM withdrawal. Peter asks Nurse Benson to take him home and secretly spits out his pills. Michael and Amanda travel to the town where Willowbridge is located and spot Kimberly at a motel, where the manager says that Kimberly works at Willowbridge. Peter botches his escape just before Michael and Amanda arrive. They are informed by a scorned Nurse Benson that Peter Burns is not a Willowbridge patient. When Kimberly tells the assembled patients that Peter will be lobotomized, another patient calls Burns-Mancini to share the news, which Sydney relays to Michael. Michael and Amanda break into Willowbridge just as the lobotomy begins. Matt is hospitalized with spinal meningitis after collapsing in front of Jo and Dominick. When Matt confesses that he was pricked by a dirty needle, Jo is angered by Dominick’s lack of empathy, although they reconcile when he agrees to be more in touch with his feelings. Jane meets clothing boutique employee Samantha Reilly, who discloses that the boutique is for sale. When Jane asks Michael for funding, he tells her that Sydney was responsible for the spiked drink at the hospital fundraiser, leading Jane to blackmail Sydney into assisting with Richard’s murder. Alison is angered after Jake sets her up on a date with Billy, who asks her to date him and return to D&D. First appearance of Brooke Langton as Samantha Reilly. Initially recurring, she would be made a series regular from season 5.
129	33	"Dead Sisters Walking"	Charles Correll	Carol Mendelsohn & Dee Johnson	May 20, 1996	2395125A	11.0
130	34	"Dead Sisters Walking"	Charles Correll	Carol Mendelsohn & Dee Johnson	May 20, 1996	2395125B	11.0
Kimberly orders Michael and Amanda locked up as escaped mental patients from Arizona, but they escape and hide in an HVAC duct. While trying to free Peter, Kimberly finds Michael and Amanda and orders the trio locked in the boiler room. When Nurse Benson overhears Kimberly’s plan to lobotomize the trio, she lets them free just as Kimberly walks in. Michael breaks through to Kimberly by professing his love for her, while Nurse Benson helps Amanda and Peter escape. In the boiler room, a confused orderly fights Kimberly, who falls from the catwalk and ends up hospitalized at Wilshire Memorial. Jane and Sydney debate the ethics of killing Richard before Jane steals blank checks from Richard. Later, Jane successfully purchases the boutique after offering Samantha a job and an apartment in exchange for telling her the offer to beat. Elsewhere, Sydney tries to thwart the murder plans. Jo is shocked by Dominick’s marriage proposal, which she rejects, before being further shocked by Dominick’s announcement that he’s moving to Bosnia for a year. Matt leaves the hospital and takes amphetamines from another medical student. Alison dances with Jake and tells him that she’s over Billy. Peter is arrested after Kimberly says she has no memory of their dinner. In jail, Peter encourages Amanda to walk away from the situation and an LAPD detective tells Amanda she’ll be subpoenaed to testify against Peter. After an initial rejection, Peter accepts Amanda’s marriage proposal so she can avoid testimony. Kimberly has a successful operation but flatlines after telling Michael she’ll testify for Peter. Amanda is visited by an LAPD detective who informs her that Peter is not the real Peter Burns. Sydney secretly empties Jane’s gun. At Richard’s house, Jane holds Richard at gunpoint and forces him to confess to the rape. When Jane’s gun fails to fire, Richard grabs the gun and pistol whips her before being knocked out by a shovel-wielding Sydney. After finding no pulse, Jane and Sydney bury Richard, only for a hand to shoot out of the ground after they drive away. Jake calls out Alison on her flirtations, and after a date with Billy, she admits to Jake that she was developing feelings for him. Billy rents out a rooftop restaurant for another date with Alison, but when Jake drops off Alison’s paycheck, she invites him inside and they kiss, leaving Billy alone. Jo encourages Dominick to spend his last few hours in the U.S. at her apartment. After he leaves for the airport, Jo chases him there and Dominick encourages her to join him in Bosnia. Matt steals Dexedrine from the hospital medicine cabinet. Final appearance of Daphne Zuniga as JoBeth Reynolds.
