= Melrose Place season 3 =

Melrose Place
- Season 3
- DVD cover
- Starring: Josie Bissett Thomas Calabro Laura Leighton Doug Savant Grant Show Andrew Shue Courtney Thorne-Smith Daphne Zuniga Special guest star: Heather Locklear as Amanda
- No. of episodes: 32

Release
- Original network: Fox
- Original release: September 12, 1994 – May 22, 1995

Season chronology
- ← Previous; Season 2 Next → Season 4

The third season of Melrose Place, an American television series, premiered on Fox on September 12, 1994. The season three finale aired on May 22, 1995, after 32 episodes.

The season was produced by Chip Hayes, co-producer Kimberly Costello, supervising producer Carol Mendelsohn, co-executive producer Frank South and executive producers Aaron Spelling, E. Duke Vincent and Darren Star.

With this season, the show moved from a Wednesday night time slot to Monday nights on FOX. This was announced with a memorable ad campaign featuring Heather Locklear with the words "Mondays are a bitch".

== Storylines ==
Jane and Sydney are blamed for Michael's hit-and-run accident, which leaves him with amnesia. Although he regains his memory (and realizes that Kimberly is his attempted murderer), they reconcile and marry in Las Vegas.

Jo is embroiled in a custody battle with the Carters (Reed's parents), who want to take their (yet unborn) grandchild away from the woman who "murdered" their son. Although Kimberly seems to help Jo by faking the baby's death so Jo can escape with her son, she steals the baby because she cannot have children of her own. When Jo reports Kimberly and Michael to Wilshire Hospital chief of staff Peter Burns (Jack Wagner), Michael returns the child. Kimberly tells the Carters that Jo's baby is alive, and they hire a nanny to steal the baby. After Jo is shot in the back while tracking them down, she decides to surrender her son for adoption.

Matt briefly reunites with Jeffrey, who tells him that he was discharged from the Navy when he tested HIV-positive. Matt is uncomfortable with Jeffrey's lust for life, and they break up. He becomes involved with married, closeted plastic surgeon Paul Graham (David Beecroft), who murders his wife in the season finale and frames Matt.

Unable to exonerate herself for Michael's attempted murder, Sydney became an outcast from this point onward for the rest of the series. After her imprisonment, Jane had her committed to a mental hospital before employing her in a work-release program. Sydney is sexually harassed and abused by Chris Marchette, Jane's sociopathic Australian business associate. After embezzling most of the funds from Jane's business, Chris fled the country after losing the stolen money gambling in Las Vegas (with Sydney his hostage).

Sydney returns to waitressing at Shooters and grows closer to Jake. However, their relationship disintegrates when Jake learns that Sydney slept with Chris to protect him from an attack by an associate. When Sydney advertises for a roommate to help pay the rent, Rikki (Traci Lords) moves in. A conniving sociopath, Rikki convinces the Melrose residents that Sydney is destroying their possessions and encourages her to join a cult led by Martin Abbott (Ramy Zada). When Sydney tries to leave the cult, she is kidnapped and Jane and Jake free her. Jealous of their romance, Sydney reverts to her devious self and breaks them up and avenges herself on Michael and Kimberly by extortion (using the money to control Jane's design business). Although Jane fights back, her business goes into foreclosure and she joins MacKenzie Hart Designs—where she becomes involved with co-owner Richard Hart (Patrick Muldoon).

Jake buys Reed Carter's boat but it is destroyed when Amanda's fugitive father (Palmer) returns and hired a contract killer, named Brittany (Kathy Ireland), to murder Jake for making him lose his business. Brittany, however, plans to kill Palmer and escape with his money and Jake. When Jake refuses to go along Brittany blows up the boat, apparently killing him. However, Jake jumped overboard and is rescued. He buys Shooters with a $50,000 FBI reward for his help in the Palmer Woodward case (leading to the off-screen arrest of Brittany and the recovery of Palmer's money).

Jake reconciles with Jo and reunites with his auto-mechanic half-brother, Jess (Dan Cortese), when their mother dies in their hometown. Jess follows Jake to Los Angeles, getting involved with Jo and arranging for Jake to be shot in an armed robbery at Shooters so Jess could take over Jake's business. Although Jo did not believe Jake that Jess arranged the shooting, when she asks Jess how he could afford an engagement ring when he proposes to her, he attacks her. When Jake learns about the attack in the season finale he and Jess fight, falling off the edge of a high platform at a construction site.

Alison's reluctance to marry Billy after the revelation about her father leads to Billy ending the relationship as Alison becomes an alcoholic. Since he still cares for her, Billy arranges for Alison to enter rehab and begins working at D & D copywriter. Amanda becomes involved with Wilshire Memorial's chief of staff Peter Burns, who helps her take over D & D by buying stock. When D & D president Bruce Teller (Stanley Kamel) is ousted he commits suicide, and Amanda replaces him. Peter conspires to remove Amanda in favor of his old girlfriend, Caitlin (Jasmine Guy); he engineers a fake appendicitis attack and tries to kill Amanda on the operating table, when Michael rescues her and he is arrested.

Amanda discovers that she has lymphoma, and is replaced at D & D by Alison. However, Alison could not cope with the sudden responsibility and workload and she quickly became aggressive, ruthless, heartless, and assertive just like Amanda. While treating her, Michael begins to fall for Amanda and they have a brief affair (enraging Kimberly). Amanda ends the affair when she recovers, teaming up with the conniving intern Brooke Armstrong (Kristin Davis) to reclaim D & D. Brooke becomes involved with Billy and sends Alison to Hong Kong on business. After helping Amanda force Alison from D & D, Brooke begins plotting to take over the company. She marries Billy in the season finale when Alison interrupts the ceremony to beg Billy for another chance.

After she is sued for divorce, Kimberly frames Michael for assaulting her. He is bailed out by Peter Burns (who got out of prison for Amanda's attempted murder), who needs his and Kimberly's help to retain his medical license. Peter seduces Kimberly so she will testify in his favor, but his appeal is unsuccessful. Realizing that Peter used her, and hallucinating, Kimberly plants four firebombs in the apartment complex. Due to the April 1995 Oklahoma City bombing, one month before the episode aired, the bombing did not appear onscreen until the beginning of season four.

== Cast ==
=== Main cast members ===
In alphabetical order

- Josie Bissett as Jane Mancini
- Thomas Calabro as Michael Mancini
- Laura Leighton as Sydney Andrews
- Doug Savant as Matt Fielding
- Grant Show as Jake Hanson
- Andrew Shue as Billy Campbell
- Courtney Thorne-Smith as Alison Parker
- Daphne Zuniga as Jo Reynolds

=== Special guest star ===
- Heather Locklear as Amanda Woodward

=== Recurring guest stars ===
- Marcia Cross as Dr. Kimberly Shaw
- Tracy Nelson as Meredith Parker
- Kathy Ireland as Brittany Maddocks
- Carmen Argenziano as Dr. Stanley Levin
- Monte Markham as John Parker
- Dorothy Fielding as Mrs. Parker
- Wayne Tippit as Palmer Woodward
- Meg Wittner as Nancy Donner
- Stanley Kamel as Bruce Teller
- Andrew Williams as Chris Marchette
- Ken Howard as George Andrews
- Penny Fuller as Marilyn Carter
- Jerry Hardin as Dennis Carter
- Carl Strano as Bob McGovern
- Jack Wagner as Peter Burns
- Cheryl Pollak as Susan Madsen
- Jason Beghe as Jeffrey Lindley
- John Saxon as Henry Waxman
- Brian Bloom as Zack Phillips
- David Newsom as Williams
- James Handy as Matt Fielding Sr.
- Claudette Nevins as Constance Fielding
- Ana Mercedes as Maria
- David James Elliott as Terry Parsons
- Jasmine Guy as Caitlin Mills
- Traci Lords as Rikki
- Ramy Zada as Martin Abbot
- John Sanderford as Dr. Barnett
- Tom Schanley as Det. John Rawlings
- Francis Xavier McCarthy as Dr. Calvin Hobbs
- Kristin Davis as Brooke Armstrong
- Dan Cortese as Jess Hanson
- Perry King as Hayley Armstrong
- David Beecroft as Dr. Paul Graham
- Dana Sparks as Carol Graham
- Zitto Kazann as Henry
- Patrick Muldoon as Richard Hart
- Morgan Brittany as MacKenzie Hart

== Episodes ==
No. overall	No. in season	Title	Directed by	Written by	Original release date	Prod. code	U.S. viewers (millions)
65	1	"I Am Curious, Melrose"	Charles Correll	Charles Pratt Jr.	September 12, 1994	2394064	16.0
Michael survives the hit-and-run, but suffers from amnesia. Jane is released when she offers evidence that incriminates Sydney. Kimberly promises to serve as Syd's alibi, then refuses to cover for her and plants a blonde wig at her apartment. Sydney is arrested. Billy deduces from Mrs. Parker's strange comments that Mr. Parker molested his daughters, and goes to San Francisco in search of Alison. Mr. Parker comes inside the house and threatens Alison, but Meredith holds him at gunpoint. He escapes when Billy bursts through the door. Billy becomes angry when Alison agrees with Amanda's advice and decides to prosecute her father instead of going to Las Vegas to elope. Jake breaks up with Amanda and decides to spend time on his boat. He takes in a beautiful woman named Brittany, who had jumped overboard following an argument with her abusive husband. Laura Leighton is made a series regular as Sydney Andrews. Anthony Tyler Quinn, who appears in a guest role as Lt. Tim Truman, later had a recurring role as Rory Blake.
66	2	"It's a Bad World After All"	Jeff Melman	Frank South	September 19, 1994	2394065	12.7
Kimberly brings Michael home from the hospital. Sydney convinces Matt to visit her in prison, and tells him that Kimberly is setting her up. Sydney's father flies in from Chicago, but enrages his daughter by suggesting she seek a plea bargain. Matt becomes suspicious of Kimberly when he realizes that she is shielding Michael from the truth about their history. Sydney's outburst convinces Mr. Andrews that she is crazy, and he and Jane have her committed to a mental hospital. Alison and Meredith fly to Wisconsin and attempt to file charges against their father, but Meredith bails out when she realizes that the town respects Mr. Parker too much to give their story credence. Alison confronts her father in front of all the prominent townspeople at a barbecue, and pushes him into admitting his guilt. Billy is fired when Nancy learns that he helped D&D get the inside track on the Escapade account, but lands a job writing ad copy for D&D. Jake sleeps with Brittany, unaware that Palmer Woodward is using her as part of a plot to destroy Jake. Daphne Zuniga does not appear in this episode.
67	3	"In-Laws and Outlaws"	Paul Lazarus	Darren Star	September 26, 1994	2394066	13.1
Chris warns that his company will have to cancel his deal with Jane's firm if Michael does not sign off on it. Sydney calls Matt from the mental hospital and pleads with him to investigate Kimberly. Jane and Matt visit the beach house, where she bonds with Michael while Matt snoops. He discovers that Kimberly owns several wigs, then rips off her wig during a confrontation at the hospital. Sydney accepts a plea bargain after a scummy staff member propositions her, and is released into Jane's custody. Kimberly vows revenge against Matt. Palmer and Brittany continue their plot against Jake. Palmer turns up on Amanda's doorstep. Billy and Alison break up after she learns that he took a job at D&D without consulting her. Jo receives a surprise visit from Reed's parents. She reluctantly admits that Reed is the father of her child, and is shocked when the Carters sue her for custody.
68	4	"Grand Delusions"	Victoria Hochberg	Kimberly Costello	October 3, 1994	2394067	12.5
Sydney (claiming to be someone named Miranda) hangs around the beach house and attempts to seduce Michael. Michael regains his memory when he is nearly struck by a car in a restaurant parking lot, but doesn't immediately reveal this. Michael leaves Sydney in an embarrassing situation in Jane's bedroom, prompting a suggestive remark from Chris. Michael confronts Kimberly and dares her to kill him, but she decides that she loves him too much to finish him off. Billy and Alison bicker constantly at the office. Jo extends an olive branch to the Carters, only to have them laugh in her face. Palmer tells Amanda that he cannot go to prison before paying off some debts, as he fears his creditors will harm her. He tells her of a secret safe deposit box and convinces her to withdraw $500,000. Palmer kidnaps Jake on the boat at gunpoint, and explains that he and Brittany are going to take the money and flee to Mexico. Brittany double-crosses Palmer, shooting him in the back. Jake discovers that the boat is laced with explosives; Brittany activates her detonator, destroying the boat.
SPE1	SP1	"A Day in the Lives of Melrose Place"	Unknown	Unknown	October 5, 1994	TBA	10.5
69	5	"Nonsexual Healing"	Charles Correll	Allison Robbins	October 10, 1994	2394068	13.7
Jake's friends (especially Jo and Amanda) are shocked to learn that the Pretty Lady has exploded. The Coast Guard finds Jake clinging for life to a buoy, and he returns to the building safely. Jo is hurt when Jake completely ignores her to visit Amanda, unaware that he is breaking the news of Palmer's death. When Jo shares her feelings with Jake, they get into a heated argument. He turns his apartment keys over to Matt and takes off on his motorcycle. Alison is disgusted when Billy begins dating their new secretary. Jane and Chris ask Sydney to seek Michael's share of the design firm in the divorce settlement, but Michael tricks her into settling for $5000. The video for Sam Phillips' "Baby I Can't Please You" plays over the closing credits as a promotion for the Melrose Place soundtrack.
70	6	"No Strings Attached"	Paul Lazarus	Dee Johnson	October 17, 1994	2394069	13.2
Jo and Amanda argue over who is to blame for Jake's departure. Jake meets his biological father, Vince Connors. After they resolve some of their differences, Vince convinces Jake to return to Melrose. Jake apologizes for abandoning Jo, then learns from the FBI that he is to receive a large reward for assisting with the capture of Brittany. Chris continually makes unwanted advances toward Sydney, but Jane believes her sister is just trying to cause trouble. Alison gets her new secretary fired, and picks up a guy at Shooters. She seeks revenge after he leads her to believe he wants a relationship, when he was actually just looking for a one-night stand. Peter Burns, the hospital's new chief of staff, lays down the law to Michael and Kimberly. First appearance of Jack Wagner as Peter Burns. Initially recurring, he would be made a series regular from season 4. The video for "Ordinary Angels" by Frente! plays over the closing credits.
71	7	"The Crook, the Creep, His Lover and Her Sister"	Scott Paulin	Carol Mendelsohn	October 24, 1994	2394070	13.2
Jake uses his reward money to purchase Shooters. When Jake drops off some papers at the design firm, Chris mistakes him for a deliveryman and makes a lewd comment about Sydney. Chris denies the allegations. Jane lashes out at Jake, and fires and evicts Sydney. Jake gives Syd a job at Shooters so that she won't have to return to the mental hospital. Chris violently attacks Sydney. Michael and Kimberly are asked to appear in a coffee ad. Peter agrees to allow this in order to impress Amanda. She goes out to dinner with him. Billy takes a liking to Alison's college roommate, Susan. Susan moves in with Alison when a chef job in Santa Barbara falls through.
72	8	"Love Reeks"	Richard Lang	Frank South	October 31, 1994	2394071	13.3
Jake provides Sydney with refuge after learning of the attack. Amanda reveals that Jane and Chris have gone to Las Vegas, and Sydney realizes that Chris is planning to make good on his promise to marry Jane. Michael fears that Chris is after Jane's money. He follows them to Las Vegas, with Kimberly in pursuit. Chris wins big in the casino and proposes to Jane. Michael and Kimberly break up the wedding, then tie the knot themselves. Michael is fired for skipping work. Jo is hospitalized with an ulcer, and Kimberly provides comfort. Jake beats up Chris and sleeps with Sydney. Peter continues to pursue Amanda. Alison learns about Billy's involvement with Susan.
73	9	"Dr. Jekyll Saves His Hide"	Charles Correll	Chip Hayes	November 7, 1994	2394072	12.2
Sydney plans to leave town to avoid her problems with Chris, but Jake convinces her to stay and give their relationship a chance. Alison claims to have accepted Billy's relationship with Susan, but begins hitting the bottle. She gets into a catfight with Susan at a client party, prompting Susan to move in with Billy. Michael asks Amanda to manipulate Peter into rehiring him. Amanda agrees, provided that Michael surrender his share in the design firm. Jane promises to give Amanda 25 percent of the business if she can arrange this. Once Michael has returned to work, he backs out of the deal and tries to blackmail Amanda. Peter encourages Amanda to seek control of D&D. Matt learns that Jeffrey, an ex-lover, is back in town. He is stunned when Jeffrey reveals that he has left the Navy and is HIV positive.
74	10	"And Justice for None"	Chip Chalmers	Kimberly Costello	November 14, 1994	2394073	13.6
The trial to determine custody of Jo's baby begins. The Carters' attorney raises many doubts about the character of Jo's friends and neighbors, but Jo shines on the stand. Kimberly learns that she cannot have children because of injuries suffered in the car accident. Alison gets drunk at a client party and leaves with a hard-living music business scout named Zack Phillips. Bruce suffers a heart attack while dancing at the event, and Peter suggests that Amanda use the opportunity to seize control of the agency. Alison is unable to testify on Jo's behalf because she is stoned following a night of partying with Zack. The judge awards custody of the baby to the Carters. Matt questions his relationship with Jeffrey due to the illness, but the two decide to commit to each other. The video for Aimee Mann's "That's Just What You Are" plays over the closing credits.
75	11	"The Days of Wine and Vodka"	Marty Pasetta	Allison Robbins	November 21, 1994	2394074	12.2
Zack encourages Alison to buy an expensive new car and skip work. Billy and Susan confront Alison during Thanksgiving dinner, but she reacts angrily and storms out. A drunken Alison tries to drive to Zack's house, but he is having a party with his friends. While distracted by her phone, she crashes into a boy on a bicycle. Kimberly explores several motherhood options, some of them illegal. She invites Jo over for Thanksgiving and convinces her to fake a miscarriage and hide her baby from the Carters. A mobster's associates begin harassing Jake. Sydney is told that Jake will suffer a serious accident unless she sleeps with the mobster's friend--Chris. Amanda leaks information about Bruce's health, while Peter prepares a takeover attempt. Matt and Jeffrey refuse to come to Thanksgiving dinner after Matt's parents ask them to hide the true nature of their relationship. The video for Letters to Cleo's "Here and Now" plays over the closing credits.
76	12	"The Doctor That Rocks the Cradle"	Richard Lang	Dee Johnson	November 28, 1994	2394075	14.0
Alison is arrested for driving under the influence. She turns to Billy for comfort when Zack neglects her, but Billy reaffirms his relationship with Susan. Alison is cleared of all charges because witnesses felt that the bicyclist had been at fault. Bruce fires Amanda when he realizes that she leaked information and scuttled a possible merger. Kimberly takes Jo to the beach house and induces labor. She checks Jo into the hospital, claiming that she delivered a stillborn child. When Jo shows up at the beach house to take the baby, Kimberly insists that the boy is her child. After Jane allows Chris to deposit a $500,000 check, Chris clears out Jane's account and kidnaps Sydney. Thomas Calabro and Doug Savant do not appear in this episode. The video for James' "How Was It for You?" plays over the closing credits.
77	13	"Just Say No"	Victoria Hochberg	Carol Mendelsohn	December 5, 1994	2394076	14.1
Bruce learns that D&D has been purchased by a consortium of doctors. Peter fires Bruce and appoints Amanda president. Amanda gives Billy a promotion and orders him to fire Alison, who has begun to experience blackouts. Bruce hangs himself in Amanda's office. Matt tells Billy that he can save Alison's job by checking her into rehab. They conduct an intervention, and Alison agrees to seek treatment. She escapes when the trio stops for gas, but later checks herself into the clinic. Sydney decides that she doesn't mind being a hostage when Chris buys her expensive gifts and gives her unlimited use of his credit cards. She finally calls Jake and asks for help after Chris loses all of Jane's money and becomes abusive. Michael, Jane and Jake fly to Las Vegas, where Jake expresses his doubts about Sydney's behavior. Jane and Michael learn that all the money is gone, and sleep together. Michael demands to know why Kimberly suddenly has a child. Jo struggles to prove that her son is alive.
78	14	"Sex, Drugs and Rockin' the Cradle"	Parker Stevenson	Frank South	December 12, 1994	2394077	13.2
Alison clashes with a man in her group meeting, NFL quarterback Terry Parsons. When Billy fails to show for a meeting featuring loved ones, Alison sneaks out to a bar and gets hammered. Terry helps her get sober and explains his earlier behavior. Billy is outraged when he learns that Susan deliberately failed to tell him about Alison's meeting. He lights into her, prompting Susan to move out. Peter displays increasingly controlling behavior toward Amanda. Jane sends a note and flowers from Michael back to the beach house, and Kimberly threatens to divorce him. The baby becomes very ill and is raced to the hospital. Michael declares Jo an unfit mother and refuses to return the child to her, even after a blood test proves she is the mother. Jeffrey is livid when Matt reveals his HIV positive status to the neighbors (to explain Jeffrey's panic over a bleeding cut). Jake breaks up with Sydney after learning that she slept with Chris.
79	15	"Holiday on Ice"	Charles Corell	Kimberly Costello	December 19, 1994	2394078	14.9
Amanda is forced to confront her Scrooge-like behavior when Bruce appears to her in a dream and leads her in a version of The Christmas Carol. He encourages her to break free of the hold that Peter has over her. She visits Alison at the rehab center to apologize, and ensures that Bruce's children are financially secure. Terry becomes jealous after seeing Billy and Alison together, and admits his own feelings for her. Matt and Jo tell Peter that Kimberly has stolen her baby. Peter orders Michael to return the child to Jo. Kimberly goes ballistic and tries to throw herself in the ocean. After Michael saves her, she calls Mrs. Carter to tell her that her grandson is alive. Jeffrey breaks up with Matt because he needs time alone to cope with his illness. Jane convinces Syd to come home for the holidays.
80	16	"Bye Bye Baby"	Jefferson Kibbee	Allison Robins	January 2, 1995	2394079	14.2
Peter hires an efficiency expert named Caitlin Mills, who proves to be a headache for Amanda. Alison neglects Billy as her romance with Terry blossoms. Michael, prompted to investigate by Amanda, learns that Peter has been padding his income through a phony research project. Billy discovers that Peter and Caitlin are romantically involved. Jo hires an Englishwoman named Emily Baldwin as her son's nanny. Jo names her son Austin, and plans to move back to New York. Emily offers Jo a ride to the airport, then drives off with the baby.
SPE2	SP2	"Love Thy Neighbor: The Baddest and the Best of Melrose Place"	Paul Wales	Bill Brown	January 9, 1995	TBA	10.4
81	17	"They Shoot Mothers, Don't They?"	Charles Correll	Dee Johnson & Carol Mendelsohn	January 16, 1995	2394080A	19.2
82	18	"They Shoot Mothers, Don't They?"	Charles Correll	Dee Johnson & Carol Mendelsohn	January 16, 1995	2394080B	19.2
Jo realizes that Austin's kidnapping was planned, and Kimberly admits that she told the Carters that the child was alive. Jo punches her. Jake and Jo hit the road in search of the Carters. They spend the night together in a motel, but Jo decides that she isn't ready for a relationship. Jake and Jo stake out the Carters' vacation home. Peter and Caitlin set up a plan to nullify Amanda's contract. Michael blackmails Peter, and Amanda calls on Matt to investigate both men. Billy discovers that Alison is romantically involved with Terry. Sydney gets a roommate--a waitress named Rikki--after Amanda raises the rent. Jake and Jo see the Carters arrive at the cabin with Emily and the baby. While Jake is calling the police, Jo disobeys his wishes and confronts the Carters. Mr. Carter shoots her in the back. Mrs. Carter sneaks into Jo's hospital room in the middle of the night, and threatens to kill Austin if she does not receive custody. The judge nullifies the previous custody arrangement, and agrees with Jo's suggestion that the baby be given up for adoption, much to the Carter's horror. While they will never be allowed to see Austin again, the judge rules Jo may do so when he turns eighteen and wants to seek her out. Amanda is fired after testing positive for illegal drug use. Amanda and Matt discover that Peter prescribed pills for Amanda that contained the active ingredient in marijuana. Although Amanda has no proof, Peter believes her bluff. He knocks her out and plans to kill her on the operating table. Michael pulls the scalpel away and breaks Peter's nose. Michael and Amanda interrupt a D&D meeting where Caitlin is to be appointed president, and discredit her. Alison stops Terry from drinking after he loses a playoff game. He expresses his gratitude by proposing marriage. She is considering the proposal when she catches him in bed with a groupie. Rikki introduces Syd to her "guru," Martin Abbot.
83	19	"Another Perfect Day in Hell"	Chip Chalmers	Frank South	January 23, 1995	2394081	16.0
Rikki commits acts of vandalism against Jo, Jane and Jake, who believe that Syd is responsible for the crimes. The isolated Sydney is forced to turn to Martin's cult for comfort. The visiting Meredith admits that she has never slept with a man because of the trauma of the childhood abuse. She tries to seduce Billy. The new chief-of-staff institutes mandatory psychological testing for the staff. Kimberly's test proves that she is extremely disturbed and highly dangerous. She has some men on the street assault test coordinator Matt, then changes her results while he is out of commission. John Rawlings, the police detective investigating the case, befriends Matt. Billy is concerned by Amanda's deteriorating health, and asks Michael to check her out. Amanda is horrified when tests reveal that she has Hodgkin's Disease.
84	20	"Boxing Sydney"	Richard Lang	Stevie Stern	February 6, 1995	2394082	14.0
Amanda and Michael clash over the treatment of her cancer, but she eventually realizes she must turn to him for support. Amanda shares her condition with Billy, but asks him to keep it a secret. Alison pries the truth from him after he seems a little too tolerant of Amanda's behavior. Sydney attends a retreat with Rikki and other cult members. She finds it unsettling when Martin demands that his followers try to scam money from their families, and decides to leave after seeing Martin in bed with two women (including Rikki). Martin agrees to let her go, but he and Rikki pursue her and throw her into a pit. John pulls Kimberly out of her car and threatens her at gunpoint after learning that she orchestrated the attack on Matt.
85	21	"St. Valentine's Day Massacre"	Chip Chalmers	Kimberly Costello	February 13, 1995	2394083	16.6
Martin lets Sydney out of the pit and talks her into staying. Jane and Jake drive to Tucson to rescue Syd, but she refuses to leave with them. They return the following day, and Sydney is alarmed when Martin asks her to shoot her sister. She instead shoots up the camp and flees with Jake and Jane. Kimberly is furious to learn the role Michael is taking in Amanda's treatment. Matt nixes a relationship with John. Jo goes on a ride-along with John to get photos for an underground magazine, and secretly snaps pictures of John beating a drug dealer. She claims she didn't see anything, but John trashes her apartment. Billy and Alison spend a platonic Valentine's Day together.
86	22	"Breakfast at Tiffany's, Dinner at Eight"	Victoria Hochberg	Allison Robbins	February 20, 1995	2394084	15.2
Michael and Amanda fly to New York to try to get her into an experimental treatment program. Kimberly sabotages their chances by phoning the doctor and telling him that Michael has a personal agenda. She also convinces Amanda that her condition is terminal. Michael tells Amanda that Kimberly is a liar, and persuades the doctor to accept Amanda as a patient. Amanda is taken aback when Michael kisses her, but she later sleeps with him. John holds Matt and Jo at gunpoint after they turn incriminating evidence over to the police. With Amanda out of town, Billy and Alison fumble away a big account. Jane convinces Jake to rehire Sydney. Syd is grateful, until she learns that her sister is dating Jake.
87	23	"And the Winner Is…"	Richard Lang	Dee Johnson	February 27, 1995	2394085	14.3
Alison goes to the Century Awards headquarters to submit Amanda's entry. An employee named Brooke Armstrong convinces Alison to also enter her own campaign. Alison and Billy get carried away while working late in his apartment. Kimberly catches Amanda and Michael in a hot tub together during a weekend retreat in Santa Barbara. Michael claims that he has decided to ignore Amanda's "obsession" with him, but later escorts her to the awards dinner. Amanda is outraged when Alison wins the award for best print ad. Michael professes his love to Amanda. Sydney's antics break up a romantic dinner between Jake and Jane. Jake dumps Jane after she issues an ultimatum about avoiding Sydney. First appearance of Kristin Davis as Brooke Armstrong. Initially recurring, she would be made a series regular from season 4.
88	24	"Love and Death 101"	Jeff Kibbee	Frank South	March 13, 1995	2394086	13.9
Alison replaces Amanda as D&D president. Alison has a liaison with Billy in her new office, but quickly rejects him. Brooke gets an internship at D&D. Michael tries to scam the city out of a million dollars by claiming that poor road conditions caused his and Kimberly's accident. Michael ships Kimberly to Rochester for a job interview so that he can move Amanda into the beach house and watch over her. Amanda collapses and is hospitalized in serious condition. Jake learns that his mother has died. He and Jo drive to Ellensburg, Washington for the funeral. They encounter Jake's half-brother Jess, who is feeling guilty over his mother's death. He also harbors resentment toward Jake. The poverty-stricken brothers once robbed a store, but Jess took the heat. He feels that Jake abandoned him by leaving for California. Jake and Jo sleep together again, but still decide not to get back together. Jake establishes a truce with Jess. Josie Bissett does not appear in this episode.
89	25	"To Live and Die in Malibu"	Chip Chalmers	Carol Mendelsohn	March 20, 1995	2394087	13.9
Kimberly comes home to discover that Amanda has been staying at her house. Amanda begins to recover from her illness, and asks Brooke to help her undermine Alison. Kimberly tries to use the $100,000 settlement from the city to keep Michael away from Amanda. He accepts her offer, but later files for divorce. Kimberly overdoses on pills, and Michael doesn't try to revive her. Alison turns into a tyrant at the office and alienates Jo during a photo shoot. Alison gives Brooke a full-time job after she convinces her father to let them use his house for a shoot. Brooke reveals that she is engaged, but later comes on to Billy in a restaurant bathroom. Jess unexpectedly arrives in Los Angeles. Jake gives him a job and a place to stay. Sydney suspects that Jess is using his brother.
90	26	"All About Brooke"	Victoria Hochberg	Dee Johnson	April 3, 1995	2394088	12.0
Michael is forced to call an ambulance for Kimberly when Sydney shows up at the beach house. Sydney swipes Kimberly's suicide note. Kimberly pays Syd $50,000 to plant pills at the beach house and incriminate Michael. Michael pays Sydney another $50,000 for the suicide note. He threatens to turn it over to the medical board unless Kimberly leaves town. Amanda laughs at Michael's marriage proposal and says that she no longer needs him. Alison rehires Amanda at D&D. Amanda and Brooke conspire to make Alison look foolish. Brooke reveals that she has broken her engagement. Billy turns to Brooke for companionship after Alison gives him the cold shoulder. Jess steals a credit card from one of the customers at Shooters and uses it to pay for a dinner with Jake and Jo. Jake and Jess squabble when Jake suspects the card is stolen. Doug Savant and Josie Bissett do not appear in this episode. The video for Seed's "Kids…This Is Fabulon" plays over the closing credits.
91	27	"Melrose Impossible"	Frank South	Frank South	April 10, 1995	2394089	11.6
Kimberly works on her self-defense skills at a survival camp called No More Victims. While in a sweat lodge, she hallucinates about being taunted by Jo, Amanda, Jane and Sydney. Amanda has a difficult time convincing Michael that their relationship is over. Jane is forced to turn the design firm over to Sydney to avoid bankruptcy. Amanda and Brooke trick Alison into committing an embarrassing gaffe with a client. Billy tires of Alison's cold behavior and sleeps with Brooke. Jess goes on a date with Jo. Jo tries to break things off to avoid hurting Jake, but ends up getting naked with Jess in the alley behind Shooters.
92	28	"Hose by Any Other Name"	Charles Correll	Allison Robbins	May 1, 1995	2394090	10.9
Amanda files a restraining order against Michael. Amanda and Brooke finally succeed in ousting Alison from D&D. Jake confronts Jo after Sydney tells him that she overheard a romantic encounter between Jess and Jo. Kimberly gets an "early graduation" from No More Victims camp after breaking the sergeant's arm. Sydney feels guilty about blackmailing Michael, so she puts him on the payroll in exchange for certain favors. Syd disobeys Jane's wishes and signs a deal with a pantyhose manufacturer, only to learn that the business is a front for a drug smuggling operation. Matt becomes involved with Paul, a new doctor who is hiding a big secret.
93	29	"Kiss Kiss Bang Bang"	Richard Lang	Dee Johnson	May 8, 1995	2394091	12.2
Jake throws Jess out of his apartment, and assaults him after his brother taunts him about Jo. Jess hires a thug to stage a robbery at Shooters and shoot Jake. Brooke convinces her father, Hayley, to offer Alison a job in Hong Kong. Billy follows Brooke's advice and persuades Alison to take the job. Alison writes a note to Billy in which she professes her love, but Brooke refuses to give it to him. Matt learns that Paul is married, but continues the relationship when Paul says that he needs Matt's help to come out. Paul's wife, Carol, threatens Matt's life. One of the alleged drug dealers reveals to Sydney that he is actually an FBI agent. He talks her into resigning so that she won't be implicated when the feds raid the design firm. Sydney is stunned to discover that the entire fiasco was a set-up engineered by Jane to oust her from the business. Kimberly seeks Amanda's friendship, then tricks her into believing that Michael is stalking her.
94	30	"Framing of the Shrews"	Chip Chalmers	Kimberly Costello	May 15, 1995	23942092	11.2
Jake suspects that Jess is responsible for his shooting, and is unmoved when Jess keeps Shooters open in his absence. Brooke replaces Alison's love note with a letter in which she states that long distance relationships cannot work. She also complicates Alison's efforts to get in touch with Billy. Billy proposes to Brooke along the boardwalk. Paul says that he is getting a divorce, and asks Matt to help him move out. He then stays inside the house and tells Carol that Matt is stalking him. Kimberly tries to convince everyone that Michael is stalking her, and makes Amanda believe that he vandalized her car. Kimberly trashes the beach house and scratches her own face. She calls the police, then stages a fight with Michael so that he will be arrested. When Kimberly returns to her motel room after a court hearing, a creepy man's image appears in a mirror and talks to her.
95	31	"The Big Bang"	Charles Correll	Carol Mendelsohn & Allison Robbins & Dee Johnson	May 22, 1995	2394093A	15.6
96	32	"The Big Bang"	Charles Correll	Carol Mendelsohn & Allison Robbins & Dee Johnson	May 22, 1995	2394093B	15.6
Peter bails Michael out of jail. He explains that he only served a few days of jail time, and asks Michael to testify on his behalf before the medical board. The demon tries to goad Kimberly into committing acts of violence against her enemies. Sydney breaks into Kimberly's motel room and discovers a grotesque photo collage of Syd and others. Sydney and Michael's warnings about Kimberly are ignored by the police. Kimberly confronts Peter about his alliance with Michael, and he expresses a romantic interest in her. Amanda tells Alison that Billy and Brooke are getting married. Alison realizes that Hayley hired her to get her out of Brooke's way. Jo rejects Jess's hasty marriage proposal. Jane's firm faces foreclosure. Jane aggressively pursues a famous designer named Richard Hart, and is hired by his ex-wife's firm. Paul tells Matt that Carol has moved out, but she is actually just out of town for the weekend. Alison returns from Hong Kong, but is unable to dissuade Billy from marrying Brooke. Jo is disturbed when Jess continues to push her to marry him. Jess explodes with rage when Jo breaks up with him. Jane seduces Richard, much to the chagrin of his ex-wife, MacKenzie. Peter is allowed to keep his medical license. Kimberly finds it difficult to control her demons after realizing that Peter was only interested in her as a character witness. Paul asks Matt to go to his house to prepare dinner. Matt triggers the alarm, and the police find him over Carol's dead body. His fingerprints are also on the murder weapon (a candlestick he had handled during a previous date). Jake returns from Billy's wedding to find the battered Jo. He tracks down Jess at his construction site to fight him, and they end up toppling hundreds of feet off a platform. Sydney follows Kimberly and observes her bizarre behavior. She trails her to the apartment building's laundry room. Kimberly ties her up and details a plan to blow up the building. She tricks Peter into coming over with a note from Amanda, and forces Sydney to call Michael. When Michael arrives, he knocks out Kimberly. He and Sydney try to clear everyone out of the building (including MacKenzie, who has just arrived to confront Jane and Richard). A drunken Alison refuses to leave her apartment. Before the others can escape, Kimberly appears in the courtyard and prepares to detonate her bombs.
