= Melrose Place =

American prime-time soap opera (1992–1999)

- Genre: Soap opera
- Created by: Darren Star
- Starring: Linden Ashby Josie Bissett Thomas Calabro David Charvet Marcia Cross Kristin Davis Rob Estes Brooke Langton Laura Leighton Amy Locane Heather Locklear Jamie Luner Alyssa Milano John Haymes Newton Lisa Rinna Kelly Rutherford Doug Savant Grant Show Andrew Shue Courtney Thorne-Smith Jack Wagner Vanessa A. Williams Daphne Zuniga
- Theme music composer: Tim Truman
- Composers: Eddie Arkin; Michael Tavera
- Country of origin: United States
- Original language: English
- No. of seasons: 7
- No. of episodes: 226 (list of episodes)

Production
- Executive producers: Aaron Spelling; E. Duke Vincent; Darren Star; Frank South; Charles Pratt, Jr.; Carol Mendelsohn; James Kahn
- Running time: 44-45 minutes
- Production companies: Darren Star Productions; Spelling Television

Original release
- Network: Fox
- Release: July 8, 1992 – May 24, 1999

Related
- Beverly Hills, 90210; Models Inc.; Melrose Place (2009); BH90210

Melrose Place is an American prime-time television soap opera that aired on Fox from July 8, 1992, to May 24, 1999, for seven seasons. The show follows the lives of a group of young adults living in an apartment complex in West Hollywood, California. The show was created by Darren Star for Fox and executive produced by Aaron Spelling for his company, Spelling Television. It was the second series in the Beverly Hills, 90210 franchise. Season one and season two were broadcast on Wednesday at 9 p.m. after Beverly Hills, 90210. In 1994, for its third season and for the rest of its run, the show moved to Monday at 8 p.m.

The show had many cast changes during its run. Thomas Calabro, Andrew Shue, and Heather Locklear were the only cast members to appear in episodes in every season of the series. Both Calabro and Shue were part of the main cast lineup throughout the show's entire run.

The show earned several Golden Globe nominations and placed No. 51 on Entertainment Weekly's "New TV Classics" list.

== Overview ==
Melrose Place premiered on Fox on July 8, 1992. The series follows the lives of a group of young adults living in an apartment complex at 4616 Melrose Place in West Hollywood, California.

Melrose Place ran for seven seasons, and its final episode aired on May 24, 1999.

== Episodes ==
Season	Episodes	Originally released	
Season	Episodes	First released	Last released
1	32	July 8, 1992	May 26, 1993
2	32	September 8, 1993	May 18, 1994
3	32	September 12, 1994	May 22, 1995
4	34	September 11, 1995	May 20, 1996
5	34	September 9, 1996	May 19, 1997
6	34	September 8, 1997	September 7, 1998
7	28	September 14, 1998	May 24, 1999

== Cast and characters ==
The first season featured eight main characters: Dr. Michael Mancini (Thomas Calabro), a physician who works at Wilshire Memorial Hospital and changes from a kind, devoted husband in season 1 to a mean, adulterous villain from season 2 on; Jane Mancini (Josie Bissett), his budding fashion designer wife; Billy Campbell (Andrew Shue), a struggling writer adapting to life out of his parents' control; Alison Parker (Courtney Thorne-Smith), a receptionist at D&D Advertising; Jake Hanson (Grant Show), a struggling manual laborer and motorcycle enthusiast; Matt Fielding (Doug Savant), a gay social worker; Rhonda Blair (Vanessa A. Williams), an aerobics instructor; and Sandy Harling (Amy Locane), a Southern belle and struggling actress who moonlights as a waitress at a local bar called Shooters, the group's main hangout. Locane was written off after 13 episodes and replaced by Daphne Zuniga as Jo Reynolds, a photographer running away from her abusive husband. Williams was not brought back for the second season, her character having become engaged to a wealthy restaurant entrepreneur.

Actress Heather Locklear, who in season one had guest starred as Alison's ambitious and merciless boss Amanda Woodward, was promoted to series regular status in the second season after her character bought and moved into the Melrose Place apartment building. Although she was always billed as a "special guest star", Locklear remained with the show for the rest of its run. Guest Laura Leighton, recurring as Jane's trouble-making younger sister Sydney Andrews in the first two seasons, was upgraded to series regular for season three. Marcia Cross, recurring as Dr. Kimberly Shaw in season 1 and early season 2, became a series regular by the end of the second season (though she was not credited in the opening until the start of season four). Janet Carroll appeared in several episodes as Marion Shaw, Kimberly's domineering mother. Beata Pozniak was featured in the second season in 7 episodes as Dr. Katya Petrova, a doctor with a daughter from a previous marriage who befriends and ultimately marries Matt (for a green card), who becomes an endearing father figure for her child.

Season four saw two new regular characters: Peter Burns (Jack Wagner), the ruthless hospital Chief of Staff introduced in season three; and Brooke Armstrong (Kristin Davis), a young, conniving intern at D&D Advertising also recurring the previous season. Davis's character was subsequently killed off in the middle of the fourth season, while Zuniga left the series at the end of the season. Patrick Muldoon also arrived in the third season as the villainous Richard Hart. Although Muldoon was not billed with the main cast (though he appeared in numerous promotional photos with them), he appeared in most of the fourth season's episodes and is also Melrose Place's longest recurring character (i.e. not in the opening credits) in terms of number of episodes.

The fifth season saw the addition of Rob Estes as restaurateur Kyle McBride, Lisa Rinna as his opportunistic wife Taylor, and Brooke Langton as Samantha Reilly, an artist and a new tenant in the apartment complex. Bissett and Cross left the series towards the end of the fifth season; Kelly Rutherford was brought in as Megan Lewis, a prostitute hired by Kimberly Shaw to have an affair with Michael Mancini, and David Charvet played Craig Field, Amanda's new co-worker and later Sydney's boyfriend. The season finale featured the exits of series regulars Thorne-Smith, Show, and Leighton.

The season premiere of season six featured the departure of original cast member Doug Savant while Alyssa Milano (recurring as Michael's sister Jennifer Mancini since season five) was bumped to series regular, with Linden Ashby joining the cast as Dr. Brett Cooper and Jamie Luner as his seductive and rich ex-wife, Lexi Sterling.

Charvet was written out in the middle of season 6, and the beginning of season seven saw the departure of Shue, Langton, Rinna, Milano, and Ashby. The show's seventh season introduced John Haymes Newton as Ryan McBride, Kyle's younger brother, and Rena Sofer as Eve Cleary, a woman from Amanda's past who marries Peter. Sofer was not billed with the main cast. Bissett reprised her role as Jane for the seventh season.

=== Cast timeline ===
Character	Actor	Seasons						
Character	Actor	1	2	3	4	5	6	7
Jane Mancini	Josie Bissett	Main (Note: Bissett departs in "Escape From L.A." (ep. 5.15).)	Main	Main	Main	Main	Recurring	Main (Note: Bissett returns in a recurring role from "Ball N' Jane" (ep. 6.31), before being added to the opening credits from "The World According to Matt" (ep. 7.1).)
Michael Mancini	Thomas Calabro	Main	Main	Main	Main	Main	Main	Main
Sandy Harling	Amy Locane	Main (Note: Locane departs in "Dreams Come True" (ep. 1.13).)						
Matt Fielding	Doug Savant	Main (Note: Savant departs in "A Brand New Day" (ep. 6.1).)	Main	Main	Main	Main	Main	
Jake Hanson	Grant Show	Main	Main	Main	Main	Main		
Billy Campbell	Andrew Shue	Main (Note: Shue depart in "Buona Sera, Mr. Campbell: Part 2" (ep. 6.34).)	Main	Main	Main	Main	Main	
Alison Parker	Courtney Thorne-Smith	Main	Main	Main	Main	Main		
Rhonda Blair	Vanessa Williams	Main						
Jo Reynolds	Daphne Zuniga	Main (Note: Zuniga is added to the opening credits from "House of God" (ep. 1.15).)	Main	Main	Main			
Amanda Woodward	Heather Locklear	Recurring	Main (Note: Locklear is credited in the opening credits as "special guest star".)	Main	Main	Main	Main	Main
Sydney Andrews	Laura Leighton	Guest	Recurring	Main	Main	Main		
Kimberly Shaw	Marcia Cross	Recurring	Recurring	Recurring	Main (Note: Cross departs in "The Dead Wives Club" (ep. 5.27).)	Main		
Brooke Armstrong	Kristin Davis			Recurring	Main (Note: Davis departs in "Devil in a Wet Dress" (ep. 4.22).)			
Peter Burns	Jack Wagner			Recurring	Main	Main	Main	Main
Kyle McBride	Rob Estes	Guest (Note: Estes first appears as Michael's college friend Sam Towler in "Irreconcilable Similarities" (ep. 1.25) and "Fire Power" (ep. 2.4).)	Guest			Main	Main	Main
Samantha Reilly	Brooke Langton				Guest	Main (Note: Reilly departs in "Buona Sera, Mr. Campbell: Part 2" (ep. 6.34).)	Main	
Taylor McBride	Lisa Rinna					Main (Note: Rinna departs in "Buona Sera, Mr. Campbell: Part 2" (ep. 6.34).)	Main	
Megan Lewis	Kelly Rutherford					Main (Note: Rutherford appears in a recurring role from "Un-Janed Melody" (ep. 5.5), before being added to the opening credits from "The Eyes of the Storm" (ep. 5.16).)	Main	Main
Craig Field	David Charvet					Main (Note: Charvet appears in a recurring role from "Un-Janed Melody" (ep. 5.5), before being added to the opening credits from "Deja Vu, All Over Again" (ep. 5.28). He departs in "Coop de Grace" (ep. 6.17).)	Main	
Brett Cooper	Linden Ashby	Guest (Note: Ashby first appears as Jo's ex-husband Charles Reynolds in "Single White Sister" (ep. 1.19) and "Peanut Butter and Jealousy" (ep. 1.20).)					Main (Note: Ashby departs in "Buona Sera, Mr. Campbell: Part 2" (ep. 6.34).)	
Jennifer Mancini	Alyssa Milano					Recurring	Main (Note: Milano departs in "Buona Sera, Mr. Campbell: Part 2" (ep. 6.34).)	
Lexi Sterling	Jamie Luner						Main (Note: Luner is added to the opening credits from "The Doctor Is In...Deep" (ep. 6.4).)	Main
Ryan McBride	John Haymes Newton							Main

Cast notes

=== Main cast members ===
- Josie Bissett as Jane Andrews Mancini (seasons 1–5, 7), fashion designer, originally from Chicago, married to Michael Mancini, later involved with Sam Towler, Robert Wilson, Chris Marchette, Richard Hart, Jake Hanson and Kyle McBride
- Thomas Calabro as Dr. Michael Mancini, resident then cardiology surgeon at Wilshire Memorial Hospital, originally from New Jersey, married to Jane, and later marries Sydney Andrews, Kimberly Shaw and Megan Lewis, also involved with Amanda Woodward, Taylor McBride and Lexi Sterling
- Amy Locane as Sandy Harling (season 1), aspiring actress and waitress at the bar Shooters, originally from South Carolina, involved with Jake
- Doug Savant as Matt Fielding (seasons 1–6), openly gay social worker and physician at Wilshire Memorial, marries Katya Petrova, involved with Jeffrey Lindley, Dr. Paul Graham, Alan Ross and Dan Hathaway
- Grant Show as Jake Hanson (seasons 1–5), mechanic and carpenter, owner of Jake's Bikes and later Shooters, involved with Colleen Patterson, Perry Morgan, Kelly Taylor, Sandy Harling, Jo Reynolds, Amanda, Sydney, Shelley Hanson and Jane, later marries Alison Parker
- Andrew Shue as Billy Campbell (seasons 1–6), taxi driver, later writer at Escapade Magazine, then copywriter for D&D Advertising, engaged to Alison Parker and later marries Brooke Armstrong and Samantha Reilly, also involved with Amanda, Susan Madsen and Jennifer Mancini
- Courtney Thorne-Smith as Alison Parker Armstrong Hanson (seasons 1–5), advertising executive at D&D Advertising and later waitress at Shooters, originally from Wisconsin, involved with Keith Gray, Steve McMillan, Zack Phillips and Terry Parsons, engaged to Billy and later marries Hayley Armstrong and Jake Hanson
- Vanessa Williams as Rhonda Blair (season 1), aerobics instructor, engaged to Terrence Haggard
- Daphne Zuniga as Jo Reynolds (seasons 1–4), freelance photographer, originally from New York City, previously married to Charles Reynolds, involved with Jake Hanson, Steve McMillan, Reed Carter, Jess Hanson, Richard Hart and Dr. Dominick O'Malley
- Heather Locklear as Amanda Woodward Parezi Burns McBride Blake (seasons 2–7, recurring season 1), vice-president then president at D&D Advertising and Amanda Woodward Advertising, owner of the Melrose Place complex, previously married to Jack Parezi and later marries Dr. Peter Burns, Kyle McBride and Rory Blake, also involved with Billy, Jake, Michael, Bobby Parezi and Craig Field
- Laura Leighton as Sydney Andrews Mancini Field (seasons 3–5, recurring season 1–2), Jane's younger sister, waitress at Shooters, then prostitute, stripper and receptionist at Burns & Mancini, marries Michael and Craig, also involved with Jake, Chris Marchette, Bobby Parezi, Kyle McBride and Carter Gallavan
- Marcia Cross as Dr. Kimberly Shaw Mancini (seasons 4–5, recurring season 1–3), resident doctor at Wilshire Memorial, originally from Cleveland, marries Michael, also involved with Peter and Dr. Brett Cooper
- Kristin Davis as Brooke Armstrong Campbell (season 4, recurring season 3), employee at D&D Advertising, marries Billy
- Jack Wagner as Dr. Peter Howell Burns (seasons 4–7, recurring season 3), chief of staff at Wilshire Memorial, originally from Texas, previously married to Beth Davis and later Amanda and Eve Cleary, also involved with Caitlin Mills, Alycia Barnett, Kimberly, Taylor and Lexi
- Rob Estes as Kyle McBride (seasons 5–7), chef and restaurant owner, former marine, originally from Boston, married to Taylor and later Amanda, also involved with Christine Denton, Jennifer, Sydney and Jane
- Brooke Langton as Samantha Reilly Campbell (seasons 5–6, recurring season 4), artist and salesperson at Jane's (later Sydney's), originally from Crisfield, Maryland, marries Billy, also involved with Craig and Jeff Baylor
- Lisa Rinna as Victoria Taylor Davis McBride (seasons 5–6), restaurant co-owner, originally from Boston, married to Kyle, also involved with Peter, Michael and Nick Reardon
- Kelly Rutherford as Megan Lewis Mancini McBride (seasons 5–7), prostitute, later receptionist at Burns, Mancini & Cooper and Amanda Woodward Advertising, marries Michael and Ryan McBride, also involved with Coop
- David Charvet as Craig Field (seasons 5–6), son of the chairman of D&D Advertising, marries Sydney, also involved with Amanda and Jennifer
- Linden Ashby as Dr. Brett "Coop" Cooper (season 6), surgeon and partner at Burns, Mancini & Cooper, originally from Cleveland, married to Lexi, also involved with Kimberly and Megan
- Alyssa Milano as Jennifer Mancini (seasons 6, recurring season 5), Michael's younger sister, originally from New Jersey, bartender at Upstairs, involved with Kyle, Craig and Billy
- Jamie Luner as Lexi Sterling Cooper (seasons 6–7), interior designer, later owner of Sterling Conway Enterprises, married to Coop, also involved with Peter, Ryan and Michael
- John Haymes Newton as Ryan McBride (season 7), Kyle's younger brother, executive at Amanda Woodward Advertising, married to Callie McBride and later Megan, also involved with Lexi

== Production ==
Filming for the series took place at a studio in Santa Clarita, California. Stages were located 30 miles outside of Los Angeles. The scenes filmed outside reveal the original facade of the building at 4616 Greenwood Place in Los Angeles serving as the main backdrop for Melrose Place. The D&D Advertising building is the same complex where the offices of Spelling Entertainment are located on Wilshire Boulevard in Los Angeles.

The production filmed episodes back-to-back, according to Rolling Stone in 1994. A dozen directors were employed during each season to direct the thirty episodes. Charles Correll is by far the main director of the series with 47 episodes to his credit over the entire production period, far ahead of the 27 episodes directed by Chip Chalmers.

In 1997, the filming of the sixth season was brought forward by two weeks because of Heather Locklear's pregnancy, which was not included in the story. A body liner was used for around ten shots. The actress also doubled her filming time and her screen time was reduced to finish filming in mid-September 1997. Lisa Rinna (Taylor) was also pregnant during filming at the end of the sixth season. However, her pregnancy was integrated into the plot. This was also the case for the pregnancy of Josie Bissett (Jane) during the seventh season. Estes and Bissett welcomed their first child, son Mason True, on July 21, 1999.

== Nielsen ratings ==
Season	Rank	Rating	US viewers (in millions)
1) 1992–93	No. 94	8.35	11.9
2) 1993–94	No. 50	10.24	14.8
3) 1994–95	No. 57	9.64	14.1
4) 1995–96	No. 61	9.37	13.2
5) 1996–97	No. 58	8.48	11.8
6) 1997–98	No. 80	7.47	9.5
7) 1998–99	No. 95	6.14	8.4

Melrose Place debuted on July 8, 1992, at No. 19 on the Nielsen ratings with a 10.3/19 share and 16 million viewers. In December 1993, Meredith Berkman of Entertainment Weekly called the show "arguably the hottest one-hour drama on television." Though ratings dropped slightly over the first season, the addition of Heather Locklear as Amanda is credited for improving ratings and bringing the show from No. 94 to No. 50 in the second season.

The series finale was watched by 10.38 million viewers.

== Reception ==
=== Critical reception ===
Melrose Place received mixed reviews from critics. As of September 2014, season 1 has a critics' rating of 4.7/10 at Metacritic. One of the critics, Time's Richard Zoglin, who gave the season a 2.0/10 score, wrote that the soap is "tapping into nothing more than worn plot lines from The Young and the Restless". Conversely, Ken Tucker of Entertainment Weekly, gave the first season a B− rating, writing: "Hey, I make fun of Melrose Place — but I'm hypnotized by it. As warm-weather escapism, it takes all the issues facing this country, from unemployment to sexual harassment, and turns them into crises that can be solved in an hour." During the second season, David Wild of Rolling Stone wrote: "After debuting in 1992 with a troubled first season that at times rivaled that of the 1962 New York Mets, Melrose Place made a few key trades. The show acquired a journeywoman heavy hitter in the lovely form of Locklear and wisely swapped bothersome Issues and Morals for infinitely more palatable Sex and Villains, emerging as a big winner, particularly with that attractive twentysomething demographic." The third season received positive reviews from critics: "After a couple lukewarm yet entertaining seasons, Melrose Place exploded in season three with the over-the-top, addictive storylines. Remember the crazy Kimberly-Michael-Sydney drama? And then Kimberly tried to keep Jo's baby! Really, this is daytime-soap-drama, heated up for primetime." In 1997, Mark Harris, who gave the soap's sixth season a D rating, stated: "Although the ever-game, deserves-better Heather Locklear still spits out even the worst lines with snappish authority, and the diabolical-doctor duo of Jack Wagner and Thomas Calabro at least try to look interested, they can't sustain a show that has lost its best asset — a twisted joy in its own trashiness."

=== Accolades ===
The series won the People's Choice Award in 1993 for 'Favorite New TV Dramatic Series'.

Heather Locklear was nominated for four Golden Globe Awards for Best Actress in a Television Series – Drama for her role as Amanda Woodward on Melrose Place, in 1993, 1994, 1995, and 1996. Laura Leighton was nominated in 1995 for Best Performance by an Actress in a Supporting Role in a Series for her role as Sydney Andrews.

In May 1994, at the height of the show's popularity, the female stars, Heather Locklear, Laura Leighton, Courtney Thorne-Smith, Daphne Zuniga and Josie Bissett, were featured on the cover of Rolling Stone.

TV Guide ranked Amanda Woodward at No. 2 in the short list of "The Biggest TV Bitches", only behind Joan Collins's iconic Alexis Carrington Colby, with whom Locklear co-starred on Dynasty. In Entertainment Weekly, Heather Locklear said about playing her: "Not trying to be a bitch. Just trying to be strong and do what you are supposed to do".

In 2012, Entertainment Weekly reunited Melrose favorites Heather Locklear, Marcia Cross, Laura Leighton, Courtney Thorne-Smith, Josie Bissett, Daphne Zuniga, Andrew Shue, Grant Show and Doug Savant, and they appeared on the cover.

== Spin-offs and other media ==
The original series produced a spin-off series, Models Inc., which ran for one season in 1994–95. That series focused on a Los Angeles modeling agency run by Hillary Michaels (played by Linda Gray), the mother of Melrose's Amanda Woodward (played by Heather Locklear); the show was cancelled after a single season due to low ratings.

A continuation of the series, also called Melrose Place, premiered on September 8, 2009, on The CW Television Network. The new series featured primarily a new cast, although five actors from the original series made appearances: Thomas Calabro, Laura Leighton, Josie Bissett, Daphne Zuniga, and Heather Locklear. The revival series suffered from low ratings and negative reviews and was cancelled in 2010 after one season.

In April 2024, another revival of the series was announced to be in development at CBS Studios, to be written by Lauren Gussis and with Locklear, Leighton, and Zuniga attached to reprise their roles from the original series.

=== Unauthorized story ===
On October 10, 2015, a television movie called The Unauthorized Melrose Place Story was released. It tells the behind-the-scenes making-of story of the show, finishing with the filming of the season three finale.

== Lawsuit ==
In 1996, actress Hunter Tylo was cast in Melrose Place and opted to leave daytime soap opera The Bold and the Beautiful to take the role. However, she was fired by Melrose Place producer Aaron Spelling prior to filming any episodes for the series, when she announced she was pregnant. The character she was to play, Taylor McBride, was recast, Lisa Rinna taking the role. Tylo quickly returned to The Bold and the Beautiful. Tylo sued Spelling on grounds of discrimination for being pregnant and won $4.8 million from a Los Angeles jury. Spelling argued that Tylo's pregnancy rendered her unable to play the character, who was supposed to be a sexy seductress. During the trial, Tylo published pictures of herself while pregnant which showed that she retained a slim figure. Prior to trial, during the discovery phase of the litigation, Tylo's lawyers won a partial victory in an interlocutory appeal challenging a lower court's order compelling her to answer a broad range of personal questions. The Court of Appeal established Tylo's right to refuse to answer questions in her deposition about marital problems and psychological treatment, although the Court sustained the portion of the order which compelled her to answer questions about her efforts to become pregnant, her husband's ability or inability to impregnate her, and communications with her agent with respect to her efforts and ability to become pregnant. The case is widely recognized as an important one in establishing the right of privacy in deposition and the right of actresses to continue to work while pregnant.

== Home media ==
CBS Home Entertainment (distributed by Paramount) have released all seasons of Melrose Place on DVD in Region 1.

The series has also been released on DVD in Region 2 and 4 by Paramount Home Entertainment, with the complete series being released on October 4, 2022.

Due to music licensing issues, most of the original music has been replaced on these DVD releases, and some episodes are edited from their original broadcast versions.

The soundtrack "Melrose Place" containing 11 tracks was released in 1994 on Giant records; in 1998 "Melrose Place Jazz" containing 16 tracks was released by Windham Hill Jazz.

The series is rated M in Australia and M in New Zealand for its sex scenes and offensive language.

DVD Name	No. of episodes	Release dates				Special features
DVD Name	No. of episodes	Region 1 (USA)	Region 2 (Scandinavia)	Region 2 (UK)	Region 4 (Australia)	Special features
The First Season	32	November 7, 2006	November 13, 2006	November 13, 2006	November 1, 2006	Season 1 episode recaps Behind the scenes featurette Mini featurettes Cast Interviews
The Second Season	32	May 1, 2007	April 1, 2007	March 13, 2007	May 3, 2007	Audio Commentary by Series Creator Darren Star; Melrose Place: Meet the Neighbours; Melrose Place: Complex Relationships; Melrose Place: The Best of the Worst
The Third Season	32	November 13, 2007	December 2, 2007	May 18, 2009	April 9, 2008	Melrose Place: According to Jake; Melrose Place: Seven Minutes in Hell; Everything You Need to Know About Melrose Place Season 3
The Fourth Season	34	April 15, 2008	March 11, 2009	March 22, 2010	April 2, 2009	None
The Fifth Season (Volume One)	19	February 10, 2009	N/A	N/A	N/A	None
The Fifth Season (Volume Two)	15	November 24, 2009	N/A	N/A	N/A	None
The Sixth Season (Volume One)	13	May 3, 2011	N/A	N/A	N/A	None
The Sixth Season (Volume Two)	14	July 19, 2011	N/A	N/A	N/A	None
The Sixth Season	27	N/A	N/A	N/A	February 6, 2019	None
The Seventh Season (Volume One)	18	July 31, 2012	N/A	N/A	N/A	None
The Seventh Season (Volume Two)	17	July 31, 2012	N/A	N/A	N/A	None
The Seventh Season	35	N/A	N/A	N/A	March 6, 2019	None
Melrose Place (Seasons 1–3)	96	N/A	N/A	N/A	April 3, 2019	Season 1 Episode Recaps Behind the scenes Featurette (season 1) Mini featurettes (season 1) Cast Interviews (season 1) Audio Commentary by Series Creator Darren Star (season 2) Melrose Place: Meet The Neighbours (season 2) Melrose Place: Complex Relationship (season 2) Melrose Place: The Best of the Worst (season 2) Melrose Place: According to Jake (season 3) Melrose Place: Seven Minutes in Hell (season 3) Everything You Need to Know About Melrose Place (season 3)
Melrose Place (Seasons 4–7)	130	N/A	N/A	N/A	June 5, 2019	None
Melrose Place: The Complete Series	226	October 4, 2022	N/A	N/A	N/A	Special Feature from Individual Sets

== GALA Committee ==
A group of artists and Melrose Place producers formed the GALA Committee, headed by artist Mel Chin, to bring artworks out of galleries and into primetime television. GALA artists designed artworks that were used as props by Melrose Place characters in the fourth and fifth seasons, often with hidden political messages:

- When Alison is pregnant, her quilt is decorated with the molecular structure of the RU-486 abortion pill.
- A bag of Chinese take-out food is emblazoned with two opposing ideograms translated from Chinese as "Human Rights" and "Turmoil"; both terms were used by the Chinese government to justify a restriction on student protesters of June 4, 1989.
- Bottles behind the counter at Shooters bar are decorated with ads and documents chronicling the history of alcohol.
- As Alison quits D&D Advertising, a framed ad in the background features a bombed-out building (the result of the Oklahoma City bombing). The damage to the structure is in the shape of a liquor bottle, and the words "Total Proof" appear on the poster.

Chin compared the works to viruses, symbiotic and invisible. The project was called In the Name of the Place, as part of the "Uncommon Sense" art show at the Geffen Contemporary at MOCA, Los Angeles, California in 1997. A portion of the fifth season was filmed at the Geffen Contemporary where the project was displayed. The artwork was also shown at the 1997 Kwangju Biennale in Kwangju, Korea and at Grand Arts in Kansas City, Missouri in 1998. Sotheby's Auction house auctioned almost fifty of these artworks for charity.
