= Thomas Calabro =

American actor and director

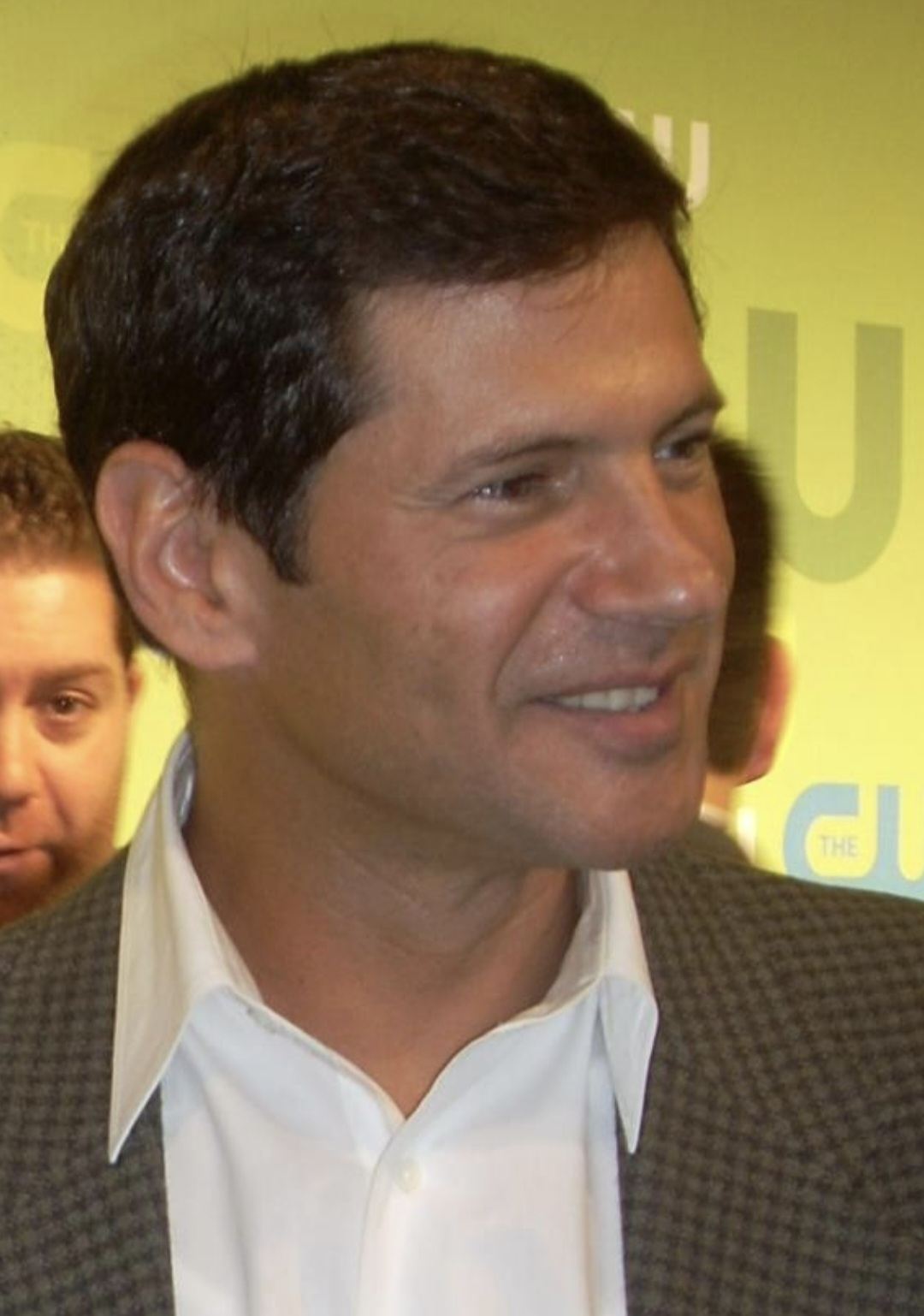
- Calabro in 2009
- Born: Thomas Calabro; February 3, 1959 (age 67); New York City, U.S.
- Occupations: Actor; director; producer
- Years active: 1984–present
- Spouses: Elizabeth Pryor (m. 1993; div. 2006) Lisa Calabro (m. 2015)
- Children: 3

Thomas Calabro (born February 3, 1959) is an American actor and director. He is known for starring as Dr. Michael Mancini on the Fox primetime soap opera, Melrose Place. He is the only original cast member to remain with the series throughout its entire original run from 1992 to 1999.

== Life and career ==
Calabro was born in Brooklyn, New York and graduated from Fordham University in New York City. He began his acting career in theatre with various roles in New York. His first role was as Oberon in William Shakespeare's A Midsummer Night's Dream. In 1990, Calabro became a member of the Actors Studio and the Circle Repertory Company, along with fellow actor Denzel Washington.

Calabro made his screen debut in the 1984 film Exterminator 2 playing secondary role, and later appeared on soap opera Guiding Light and a number of made-for-television movies. In 1989, he starred in the short-lived NBC drama series, Dream Street. The following year he co-starred in the miniseries Vendetta: Secrets of a Mafia Bride. He also appeared in Father Dowling Mysteries, Law & Order and Columbo: No Time to Die.

In 1992, Calabro was cast as Dr. Michael Mancini on the Fox prime time soap opera, Melrose Place. He was the only cast member to stay on the show throughout its entire run from 1992 until 1999. He also directed four episodes. After Melrose Place, Calabro starred in a number of made-for-television movies, most notable the leading roles of Hollywood writer in the 2000 comedy film Best Actress, and the horror film They Nest. During the 2000s, he also appeared in other made-for-television movies for Lifetime and SyFy, as well as an uncredited appearance in a music video for nephew Brandon Calabro's band, Crazy Town.

Calabro guest starred on television series Touched by an Angel, Nip/Tuck, Without a Trace, Cold Case, Greek, Castle and NCIS. In April 2009, People Magazine announced that Calabro would appear in the 2009 reboot of Melrose Place, a continuation of the original show, to be aired on The CW. He appeared in nine episodes.

During the 2010s, Calabro mostly played supporting roles in a number of movies, include Locker 13 (2014) and The Man in 3B (2015). In 2015 he joined the cast of web soap The Bay appearing in 21 episodes. In 2018, he returned to prime time television with a major recurring role in the TNT series, The Last Ship. From 2023 to 2024 he appeared in the BET+ series, The Black Hamptons.

== Personal life ==
Calabro has three children with his former wife Elizabeth Pryor.

== Filmography ==
=== Film ===
Year	Title	Role	Notes
1984	Exterminator 2	Larry	
1985	Out of the Darkness	Zigo's Nephew	TV movie
1988	Ladykillers	Cavanaugh	TV movie
1990	Vendetta: Secrets of a Mafia Bride	Nearco	TV movie
1991	The Return of Eliot Ness	Band Member	TV movie
1992	Columbo: No Time to Die	Detective Andy Parma	TV movie
1995	Sleep, Baby, Sleep	Detective Martinson	TV movie
1995	Stolen Innocence	Richard Brown	TV movie
1997	L.A. Johns	David Abrams	TV movie
1997	Made Men	Nicky "Shoes" Piazza	
2000	Ice Angel	Ray Rossovich	TV movie
2000	Best Actress	Ted Gavin	TV movie
2000	They Nest	Dr. Ben Cahill	TV movie
2001	Face to Face	Philly	
2001	Hard Knox	Steve Hardman	TV movie
2004	Her Perfect Spouse	Matt Thompson	TV movie
2004	Single Santa Seeks Mrs. Claus	Andrew	TV movie
2007	Chill	Sam	Video
2007	Cake: A Wedding Story	Bernard	
2007	Til Lies Do Us Part	Trey Mitchell	TV movie
2007	Ice Spiders	Captain Baker	TV movie
2008	Safehouse	Charles York	
2008	Fall of Hyperion	John Brighton	TV movie
2010	Detention	Coach L	
2010	Elle: A Modern Cinderella Tale	Allen	
2012	Devils Inside	Tony Marconi	TV movie
2013	Hidden Away	Sloan	TV movie
2014	Locker 13	Harvey	
2014	The Barber	Thomas McCormack	
2015	The Man in 3B	Sam	
2016	Love in the Vineyard	Randall Slade	TV movie
2016	The Wrong House	Detective Carter	TV movie
2020	American Zombieland	Mayor Sykes	
2020	Influence	Lieutenant Barnes	
2021	Killer Cheer Mom	James	TV movie

=== Television ===
Year	Title	Role	Notes
1989	Dream Street	Joey Coltrera	Main Cast
1990	Father Dowling Mysteries	Sean McAllister	Episode: "The Royal Mystery"
1990	Law & Order	Ned Loomis	Episode: "Kiss the Girls and Make Them Die"
1992−99	Melrose Place	Dr. Michael Mancini	Main Cast
1995	Burke's Law	Nick Blackwood	Episode: "Who Killed the Gadget Man?"
1996	Ned & Stacey	Don Morelli	Episode: "New Year's Eve"
1997	Mad TV	Host	Episode: "Episode #2.17"
2001	Touched by an Angel	Ben Mason	Episode: "The Sign of the Dove"
2005	Nip/Tuck	Dr. Abrams	Episode: "Ben White"
2006	Cold Case	ADA William Danner	Episode: "Death Penalty: Final Appeal"
2008−09	Greek	Senator Ken Logan	Guest Cast: Season 1 & 3
2009	Without a Trace	Ken Gilroy	Episode: "Believe Me"
2009−10	Melrose Place	Dr. Michael Mancini	Recurring Cast
2010	CSI: NY	Charles Harris	Episode: "Do Not Pass Go"
2010	Whacked	Angelo	Episode: "The Out-of-Towners"
2011	Castle	Scott Donner	Episode: "Nikki Heat"
2011	NCIS	Len Feeney	Episode: "Freedom"
2012	Glee	Mr. Puckerman	Episode: "Choke"
2015–19	The Bay	Arthur Tobin	Recurring Cast: Season 2 & 4, Main Cast: Season 3
2016	Hit the Floor	Marcus Douglas	Episode: "Upset"
2017	The New Edition Story	Bill Dern	Episode: "Part 1"
2018	The Last Ship	General Don Kincaid	Recurring Cast: Season 5
2023–24	The Black Hamptons	Eli Shepperd	Recurring Cast: Season 2
