= David Newsom =

American actor

- Born: March 10, 1962 (age 64); North Caldwell, New Jersey, U.S.
- Education: Ithaca College
- Occupations: Actor, film producer, photographer
- Years active: 1989–present
- Spouse: Sian Heder
- Children: 2

David Newsom (born March 10, 1962) is an American actor, producer and fine-art photographer. He is best known for his various critically acclaimed appearances in American television and for his work with Viggo Mortensen and Perceval Press.

== Career ==
=== Photography ===
Along with film and TV work, Newsom is a long-time photographer with and emphasis on fine art photography. In 2005, he collaborated with Viggo Mortensen to create a photo journal called Skip (Newsom's eldest brother's nickname) which was then published by Mortensen's Perceval Press. In June 2006, with Viggo Mortensen, Lindsay Brice and Stanley Milstein, Newsom anchored a successful group photographic show entitled Four Tales from Perceval.

In June–July 2007, Newsom held his first comprehensive one man show titled, Three Miles of Idaho, at DCA Fine Art in Santa Monica, California.

=== Film and television ===
In 2005, Newsom began producing movies, starting with his first short film Mother, written and directed by Sian Heder. In April 2006, Mother won the Grand Jury Award for Best Narrative Short at the Florida Film Festival, a victory which automatically qualified the film for a potential Academy Award nomination. Mother was also selected for the May 2006 Cinefondation Competition of the Cannes Film Festival, where it won third place in a field of 18 films from around the globe. The film was then selected for many other festivals, including the prestigious Seattle International Film Festival, where it received the "2006 Short Film: Narrative Special Jury Prize". Mother continues to play globally, and recently took the Grand Jury Award-Narrative Shorts at the Oxford Film Festival.

In early 2007, Newsom and Heder partnered with The Mark Gordon Company and are in pre-production on the feature film, Tallulah. He produced Open Your Eyes for director Susan Cohen in the summer of 2007. Cohen, a recipient of a 2007 AFI Directing Workshop for Women grant, wrote Open Your Eyes as a tribute to the women she had known who battled and lived with cancer. In May 2008, Open Your Eyes was awarded the AFI "Jean Picker Firstenburg Award of Excellence". In recent years, Newsom has been busy producing adventure/reality television for such networks as: Discovery Channel, Nat Geo and History. From 2010 to 2011, he was a field producer, cameraman and story producer for season seven of Discovery Channel's Deadliest Catch.

In fall of 2011, he was a field producer/cameraman for seasons two and three of National Geographic's Wild Justice.

=== Habitat garden consultation ===
In 2014, when his daughter was born, Newsom transformed his lifeless yard into a garden providing habitat for wildlife. He started a non-profit called the Wild Yards Project to inspire people across the country to create habitat where they live and help them get the tools they need to get it done. His goal is for the planet to remain habitable for children. He does habitat consultation in northeast LA and helps design and install gardens.

== Personal life ==
Newsom was born in North Caldwell, New Jersey, to a mother who managed an employment agency and an investor father.

He lives in Los Angeles with his wife, writer/director Sian Heder, with whom he has two children. Newsom has a degree in film production from Ithaca College.

== Filmography ==
=== Actor ===
==== Film ====
Year	Title	Role	Notes
1994	Wes Craven's New Nightmare	Chase Porter	Film debut
1996	Boys	Curt	
1997	Black Circle Boys	Coach Earhorn	
1998	Where's Marlowe?	Jake Pierson	
2004	A One Time Thing	Dillon	
2005	Kiss Kiss Bang Bang	Agent Type	Credited as David Newsome

==== Television ====
Year	Title	Role	Notes
1989	China Beach	Kid	Episode 3.05: "Independence Day"
1990	Quantum Leap	Lt. Tom Beckett	Episode 3.01: "The Leap Home (Part 1)"; Episode 3.02: "The Leap Home (Part 2) – Vietnam"
1991	China Beach	Leslie Maltbie	Episode 4.12: "The Always Goodbye"
1991–1992	Homefront	Lt. Hank Metcalf	Main cast; 24 episodes
1992	Murder, She Wrote	Neal Latimer	Episode 9.02: "Family Secrets"
1993	Trouble Shooters: Trapped Beneath the Earth	Cody Mather	Made-for-television film
1994	Sweet Justice	Tom	Episode 1.01: "Pilot"
1994	Chicago Hope	Doctor in Asylum	Episode 1.02: "Over the Rainbow"
1994	Murder, She Wrote	Henry Wilson	Episode 11.08: "Crimson Harvest"
1994–1995	Melrose Place	Williams	Episode 3.10: "And Justice for None"; Episode 3.12: "The Doctor who Rocks the Cradle"; Episode 3.17: "They Shoot Mothers, Don't They? (1)"
1995	Sisters	Charles "Charlie" Holland	Episode 5.17: "Angel of Death"
1996	Touched by an Angel	Mark Monfort	Episode 2.12: "The One That Got Away"
1996	Sweet Dreams	Dr. Jack Renault	Made-for-television film
1997	The Big Easy	Frank Romeo	Episode 1.17: "Don't Shoot the Piano Player"
1997	Rose Hill	John Stringer	Made-for-television film
1998	Suddenly Susan	Kenny "The Hammer" Fleming	Episode 2.21: "Pucker Up"; Episode 2.22: "5,947 Miles"
1998	House Rules	William McCuskey	Main cast; 7 episodes
1998	Fantasy Island	Unknown role	Episode 1.08: "Handymen"
1998–1999	Godzilla: The Series	Cameron Winter	Voice actor; 3 episodes
1999	Will & Grace	Peter	Episode 1.16: "Yours, Mine, or Ours"
1999	Judging Amy	Jack Overby	Episode 1.01: "Pilot"; Episode 1.02: "Short Calendar"
2000	Talk to Me	Rob	Main cast; 3 episodes
2003	Spider-Man: The New Animated Series	Gary	Voice actor; 1 episode
2004	Like Family	Jim	Episode 1.13: "Ladies' Night"
2004	The Days	Jack Day	Main cast; 6 episodes
2005	Inconceivable	Dave Cohen	5 episodes (4 unaired)
2005	24	Scott Borman	Episode 4.08: "Day 4: 2:00 p.m. – 3:00 p.m."
2005	CSI: Crime Scene Investigation	Hayden Michaels	Episode 5.17: "Compulsion"
2006	Without a Trace	Brian Sullivan	Episode 4.19: "Expectations"
2006	Windfall	Frankie's father / Pa Townsend	4 episodes
2006	Runaway	Randy O'Connor	2 unaired episodes
2007	Dirt	Jimmy Ray Banheart	Episode 1.10: "The Sexxx Issue"
2007	CSI: Miami	Will Bedford	Episode 6.03: "Inside Out"
2007	Private Practice	John Burton	Episode 1.05: "In Which Addison Finds a Showerhead"
2007	Ghost Whisperer	Tony Cahill	Episode 3.09: "All Ghosts Lead to Grandview"
2008	The Mentalist	Michael Bennett	Episode 1.04: "Ladies in Red"
2009	Supernatural	Brian Carter	Episode 4.11: "Family Remains"
2011	Men of a Certain Age	Mark Elliott	Episode 2.05: "And Then the Bill Comes"
2015	Orange Is the New Black	Guru Mack	Episode 3.07: "Tongue-Tied"
