= Wild Justice (TV series) =

Reality television show

- Genre: Reality television
- Narrated by: Thom Beers
- Composer: Jonathan Miller
- Country of origin: United States
- Original language: English
- No. of seasons: 4
- No. of episodes: 70

Production
- Executive producers: Thom Beers, James A. Swan
- Producer: David Newsom
- Production location: California
- Cinematography: Byron Goggin
- Running time: 45 minutes
- Production company: National Geographic

Original release
- Network: National Geographic
- Release: October 28, 2010 – November 1, 2013

Related
- Southern Justice and Kentucky Justice

Wild Justice is a reality television series which followed the activities and exploits of the California Department of Fish and Wildlife game wardens, from 2010 to 2013, as they investigate crimes ranging from poaching to illicit marijuana cultivation. The series was produced by the National Geographic Channel and aired for a total of four seasons.

The premier of Wild Justice was the highest rated show in National Geographic's history, according to executive producer Phil Segal. The series premiere of Wild Justice set a National Geographic record with 3.2 million viewers.

The show was criticized for exaggerating and embellishing investigations that resulted in citations to look good for television. One informant, who gave the Game Wardens information about poachers in Glenn County, was assaulted by masked poachers after his identity was revealed in an episode of the show.

Wild Justice has spurred two spinoff series: Kentucky Justice and Southern Justice.
