= Melrose Place season 7 =

Melrose Place
- Season 7
- Starring: Josie Bissett Thomas Calabro Rob Estes Jamie Luner John Haymes Newton Kelly Rutherford Jack Wagner Special guest star: Heather Locklear as Amanda
- No. of episodes: 28

Release
- Original network: Fox
- Original release: September 14, 1998 – May 24, 1999

Season chronology
- ← Previous; Season 6

The seventh and final season of Melrose Place, an American television series, premiered on Fox on September 14, 1998. The series finale aired on May 24, 1999, after 28 episodes.

The season was co-produced by Heather Locklear and Antoinette Stella, coordinating producer Robert Del Valle, supervising producer Peter Dunne, and executive producers Aaron Spelling, E. Duke Vincent, Carol Mendelsohn and Charles Pratt, Jr.

The season was released on DVD as two-volume box sets under the title of Melrose Place – The Seventh and Final Season: Volumes One and Two on July 31, 2012, by Paramount Home Video.

== Storylines ==
For the final season, new characters were added, including Kyle's younger brother, Ryan McBride (John Haymes Newton) (whose daughter lived in a New York convent after her mother's death), and Eve Cleary (Rena Sofer), Amanda's friend from school. Matt, who had moved away a year earlier, is revealed to have died in a car crash on his way to a reunion dinner at Kyle's restaurant. He kept a coveted journal of all the secrets the residents shared with him.

After her sham remarriage to Cooper, Lexi apologizes to Peter for blaming him for her father's death and they reconcile. However, Peter realizes that he still cares for Amanda and Lexi dumps him again, and this time for good. Lexi then launches a campaign against Amanda, buying the Melrose Place building from her and opening a new advertising agency, Sterling-Conway Advertising, which drives her out of business.

Amanda and Eve Cleary were high-school cheerleaders in Dallas, Texas. An ugly encounter ended in the death of Eve's boyfriend and her 15-year imprisonment. Kyle learns about their past, agreeing to keep it from Peter (Eve's new husband).

When Kyle and Amanda try to conceive Peter accidentally gives him the wrong test results, indicating that he is sterile. Kyle descends into alcoholism; Amanda is depressed by his behavior, until they reconcile after Kyle finishes rehab. Although Amanda agrees to sell the building to buy their dream home, their marriage ends.

Josie Bissett returned to the series as Jane in 1998, and plotlines centered on her rekindling relationship with Michael. She slept with a client of Amanda's the day before her wedding to Michael, leading to his distrust of her as they decide to marry again. After exchanging vows again, they are estranged and on the road to divorce within hours. They have a brief reunion at Christmas.

Megan and Ryan begin a relationship, marrying in the series finale. Jane joins Kyle (the actors were married in real life) and Amanda joins Peter (despite his marriage to Eve). Lexi becomes sexually involved with Michael, but they break up after she rejects his proposal (realizing that they cannot be faithful to each other).

By early 1999, Fox decided to cancel the show due to falling ratings and high production costs. In the final episode, Amanda and Peter face mounting scrutiny; he is investigated for embezzling from the hospital, and she learns that Amanda (not Eve) killed her boyfriend 15 years ago. When they flee the country their hideout explodes, apparently killing them both. Eve cracks at their memorial service, throws Peter's ashes on Lexi and is jailed. Michael becomes Wilshire Hospital's chief-of-staff. Kyle and Jane discover that she is having Michael's baby, and an anonymous envelope appears containing Amanda's locket. At the end of the series finale Amanda and Peter marry on a tropical beach, rejoicing at their success in faking their deaths and paying Michael a million dollars in hush money. In the final scene, they walk along the beach to "Closing Time."

== Cast ==
=== Main cast members ===
In alphabetical order

- Josie Bissett as Jane Mancini
- Thomas Calabro as Michael Mancini
- Rob Estes as Kyle McBride
- Jamie Luner as Lexi Sterling
- John Haymes Newton as Ryan McBride
- Kelly Rutherford as Megan Lewis
- Jack Wagner as Peter Burns

=== Special guest star ===
- Heather Locklear as Amanda Woodward

=== Recurring guest stars ===
- Rena Sofer as Eve Cleary
- Chea Courtney as Sarah McBride
- Alexandra Paul as Terry O'Brien
- James Darren as Tony Marlin
- Mark L. Taylor as Dr. Louis Visconti
- Steve Wilder as Alex Bastian
- Stephanie Cameron as Audrey Williams
- Karyn Parsons as Jackie Zambrano
- Michael Watson as Travis Hill

== Episodes ==
No. overall	No. in season	Title	Directed by	Written by	Original release date	Prod. code	U.S. viewers (millions)
199	1	"The World According to Matt"	Charles Correll	Frank South	September 14, 1998	2398191	9.41
Matt dies in a car accident while on his way to dinner at Kyle's club. His mother gives Amanda a diary in which he recorded secrets about his friends and neighbors. Jane is amused to learn that Michael worked as a stripper during college; but their new engagement is threatened after she reveals that she slept with an old friend, Alex Bastian, the night before their wedding. Amanda learns from the diary that Kyle has a brother named Ryan. They quarreled after Kyle accused Ryan of making a pass at Taylor. Amanda convinces Kyle to bury the hatchet. Amanda removes an incriminating page from the diary. Beck returns the ransom money to Peter. Amanda tells Peter that the diary revealed that he performed heart surgery on Beck while he was unlicensed. Peter believes that the missing page relates to Amanda's feelings for him, and snoops in her apartment. Amanda mistakes him for a burglar and shoots him. Lexi decides to branch out into advertising. A distraught Megan throws herself at Michael, then vanishes after he rejects her. First appearance of John Haymes Newton as Ryan McBride. Furthermore, this episode marks Heather Locklear's debut as a co-producer.
200	2	"Where the Hookers Grow"	Jefferson Kibbee	Charles Pratt, Jr.	September 21, 1998	2398192	9.02
Kyle is jealous of the amount of time Amanda spends with the recuperating Peter. He and Ryan quarrel after Ryan mentions Kyle's concerns to Amanda. Amanda referees the dispute and gives Ryan a job at her agency. Peter, fearing that he is about to die, confesses his involvement in the kidnapping to Dr. Visconti. Lexi seduces Dr. Visconti to pry the truth from him. Michael follows Megan to her parents' home, and is stunned to find that the family is wealthy. Megan discovers that her father suffered a crippling stroke years ago, which Mrs. Lewis claims is the result of the strain of learning that Megan was a prostitute. Michael discovers that Megan's mother is lying to force Megan to stay home out of guilt. Jane takes a job at AWA. She is asked to persuade Alex—now a famous designer—to bring his business to the agency.
201	3	"Dr. Jealousy"	Charles Correll	Carol Mendelsohn	September 28, 1998	2398193	8.11
Peter learns that Lexi has uncovered the truth about his involvement in Amanda's kidnapping. Peter returns the ransom money to Amanda and Kyle, explaining that Beck pressured the kidnappers. Lexi threatens to expose Peter unless he sleeps with her. Peter decides to call her bluff, and Lexi races to the club to talk to Amanda. Amanda burns the journal—and the missing page—after Kyle continually accuses her of protecting Peter. Ryan tries to make a move on a reluctant Megan. Megan takes a job for Lexi, and winds up vying with Ryan for an account in Arizona. Car problems force the two to spend time together, but Megan says that she is not ready for a relationship. Michael is jealous of Jane's new working relationship with Alex. He decides to push Jane away to see if she can resist Alex's advances. Michael spies Alex kissing Jane at a restaurant.
202	4	"Not Quite All About Eve"	Jack Wagner	James Kahn	October 19, 1998	2398194	8.90
Lexi does not tell Amanda about the kidnapping because she doesn't want Peter to go to prison. Singer Eve Cleary is struck by a car outside the club after Kyle fires her. Peter assists in her recuperation, and Amanda convinces Kyle to give Eve another chance. Amanda is annoyed when Kyle continues to obsess over the missing journal page. Amanda has a clandestine meeting with Eve outside the club. She tells her that she once told a friend their secret, but will not make this mistake again. Amanda fires Ryan because she suspects that he leaked information to Lexi's agency. She welcomes him back after he proves that her assistant was the actual spy. Megan tells Ryan about her past and explains her reluctance to open up to him. Michael pretends to go out of town, then keeps Jane and Alex under surveillance. Jane fears that Michael is having an affair with Megan, but resists Alex's persistent advances. First appearance of Rena Sofer as Eve Cleary. Although never credited as a main cast member, she appears in every episode from her first appearance in season 7 all the way to the finale.
203	5	"The Rumor Whisperer"	Jefferson Kibbee	Charles Pratt, Jr.	October 26, 1998	2398195	8.58
Amanda is nominated for a magazine's Businesswoman of the Year award, and is considered a strong favorite. Lexi sleeps with Drew MacKenzie, the magazine's editor-in-chief, in the hopes of convincing him to give her the honor instead. When her plan fails, she starts a rumor that Amanda won the award by sleeping with Drew. Megan learns the truth when she eavesdrops on a conversation between Lexi and Drew. Jane shares the news with Amanda, who humiliates Lexi in her acceptance speech and mockingly presents her with the award. Jane accuses Megan of having an affair with Michael. Michael suggests that he and Jane elope. Michael punches Alex after he claims that Michael's haste stems from his fear that Jane will sleep with Alex. Jane threatens to call off the wedding unless Michael agrees to trust her. She temporarily moves back to the apartment building. Peter and Eve have their first date (miniature golf). He is touched by her enthusiasm for mundane things such as hot dogs, but she frightens him with an overly passionate kiss. Eve sends Peter a love letter, but is hurt when she hears him sarcastically reading it to Michael. They later decide to make a fresh start. Ryan tells Megan that he is still interested in her.
204	6	"The Night the Lights Went Out at Melrose"	Charles Correll	Carol Mendelsohn	November 2, 1998	2398196	8.35
Lexi decides not to fire Megan for her betrayal because she cannot stand to lose her only friend. Peter sleeps with Eve, but then refuses to return her calls. Amanda goes to Peter's office to confront him, and the two are trapped in an elevator during a citywide power outage. Peter realizes that he has been cold to Eve because he is afraid of destroying another relationship. Michael is forced to take an apartment due to structural damage at the beach house. Alex threatens to pull his account unless Amanda helps him win over Jane. Michael is mistaken for a looter and arrested. Alex sneaks into Jane's apartment and makes a pass at her. Megan and Ryan bond over a lost dog and share a rooftop kiss, but she quickly rejects him. Lexi shows up at the building during the blackout, and Ryan ogles her as she swims in the nude.
205	7	"Suspicion"	Chip Chalmers	James Kahn	November 9, 1998	2398197	9.10
Kyle becomes suspicious of Eve after she angrily rejects a record deal. Eve visits the courthouse. Peter catches her in a lie about her whereabouts, but she covers her tracks by giving him a present. He asks her to move in with him. Amanda abruptly sends Jane on a business trip to Chicago, where she works closely with Alex. Alex promises to remain professional, but he and Jane end up kissing passionately. Peter tries to distract Michael by throwing a bachelor party. The evening is spoiled by the distraught stripper, who whines about her ex-boyfriend. Peter drugs Michael to stop him from going to Chicago. Megan and Ryan behave coldly to each other. Ryan ignores his brother's warning and sleeps with Lexi.
206	8	"Fiddling on the Roof"	Anson Williams	Antoinette Stella	November 16, 1998	2398198	8.73
Overcome with guilt after kissing Alex, Jane hides out at a hotel. She fears that she is making a huge mistake by re-marrying Michael. She suffers a panic attack and passes out. Amanda goes to the church to tell a heartbroken Michael that the wedding is off. Jane decides that she wants to marry Michael after all. Michael refuses to talk to her, but Peter ambushes him with a ceremony at the hospital. Michael agrees to marry Jane after hearing her vows. Alex shows up at the reception and leads Michael to believe that he slept with Jane. Michael gets drunk and humiliates Jane with accusations of infidelity. She seeks refuge at Alex's house, only to discover that he is not using the clothing designed during her trip to Chicago. Alex admits that he had invented a work emergency in the hopes of getting closer to Jane. During the reception, Megan catches Ryan and Lexi in a compromising position in a bathroom. She tries to drink away her sorrow, and finds comfort with Michael. While heavily intoxicated, they break into Ryan's apartment and gain roof access. Jane visits Amanda's apartment in search of advice and ice cream. Michael and Megan kiss and become amorous. The roof suddenly collapses, sending the half-naked duo crashing into Amanda's bedroom—where Amanda, Jane, Ryan and Kyle look on.
207	9	"Lethal Wedding 4"	Richard Denault	Charles Pratt, Jr. & Carol Mendelsohn	November 23, 1998	2398199	8.80
Following the roof incident, Ryan insults Megan and gets into a fist fight with Michael. Jane burns her wedding dress on the barbecue. Amanda sues Michael for the roof damages, tries to fire Ryan and Jane, and blames Lexi for everything. Jane sues Michael for divorce, and he responds with a countersuit. Amanda hopes to force the Mancinis to talk things out by locking them in the laundry room overnight. They wind up dredging up the past (and Jane actually says Sydney's name!). Megan tells Michael to go easy on Jane after learning that she may have breast cancer. Megan quits her job, but returns (as vice president) after Lexi begs for forgiveness. Ryan again repels Megan by gyrating onstage with the musical guest. Peter learns that his father—a spiteful man who struggled as a pro golfer—has died friendless. He hopes to avoid his father's fate by proposing to Eve. Eve arranges a wedding in her hometown, then sneaks out with Amanda to visit her grandmother. Kyle follows them, and badgers the old woman into revealing that Eve spent 15 years in prison. Lexi, unaware that Peter is about to tie the knot, calls him to profess her love. Kyle harasses Eve before the wedding. Amanda interrupts and confesses that she and Eve once committed a murder.
208	10	"When Cheerleaders Attack"	Chip Chalmers	Jule Selbo	November 30, 1998	2398200	9.03
Amanda and Eve reveal their secret to Kyle. During high school, Eve's quarterback boyfriend Kent made a play for Amanda at the football stadium. He tried to rape her when she refused him. Eve saved Amanda by shoving Kent from the bleachers to his death. His family claimed that the act was premeditated, and Eve was sentenced to 20 years in prison. Eve and Amanda beg Kyle not to share the truth with Peter. Peter and Eve are married, and find a naked Lexi waiting in their room. Peter threatens Lexi when she tries to blackmail him with her knowledge of Amanda's kidnapping. Eve is haunted by nightmares about Kent. Megan and Ryan take Lexi home after she rushes the Upstairs stage in a drunken stupor. After Ryan saves her from falling off her balcony, Lexi decides to turn over a new leaf. She tries to make nice with Amanda, but later admits that this is part of a scheme. Megan considers dating Ryan. Michael learns of Jane's potential illness and offers to support her. Jane leans on him temporarily, but rejects him after getting a clean bill of health. Amanda is nearly flattened by a delivery truck, and suddenly decides she wants a baby. Amanda and Kyle find oceanfront property for sale, and Kyle gives the owner a sob story to convince him to accept their bid.
209	11	"Suddenly Sperm"	Gabrielle Beaumont	Cynthia J. Cohen	December 14, 1998	2398201	8.20
Michael must sell the beach house to pay off his debts. The voyeuristic real estate agent closes a deal within two days, then sleeps with Michael. Jane and Michael reminisce about their first date, but she tries to move on by going out with a dork from the office. Amanda plans to turn over day-to-day control of her agency to Ryan. A lazy lab technician's error convinces Kyle that he is sterile. Ryan and Megan's first date is a disaster, but they later admit their attraction and kiss. Lexi, Amanda and Eve organize a charity Christmas function. They visit a Christmas tree lot, where a former prison guard recognizes Eve. Lexi witnesses an argument between the two and suspects that Eve is hiding something about her past.
210	12	"The Usual Santas"	Charles Pratt, Jr.	Charles Pratt, Jr.	December 21, 1998	2398202	8.26
Lexi, Amanda and Eve are caught in a bank hold-up involving men in Santa Claus suits. The guys (including Dr. Visconti) plan to play Santa at area elementary schools, but are mistaken for the bank robbers and arrested. They are detained until Lexi, Amanda and Eve clear up the misunderstanding. Amanda begins to worry about Kyle's drinking. Travis tries to blackmail Eve into sleeping with him, but Kyle pummels him and orders him to leave town. Lexi has an enlightening conversation with Travis, which leads to a fist fight with Eve. Lexi warns Peter that his current and former wives are keeping a secret from him. An eccentric judge orders Michael and Jane to spend the holidays performing community service together. Jane forgives Michael, who then has himself delivered to her apartment in a box. Lexi surprises Megan with a catered Christmas dinner, only to find that she has spent the greater part of three days in bed with Ryan. The teen pop group Hanson performs a charity concert at the club, and Lexi makes an inappropriate remark.
211	13	"The Kyle High Club"	Jefferson Kibbee	James Kahn	January 11, 1999	2398203	8.55
Kyle continues to abuse alcohol and prescription pills. After a vicious argument with Amanda regarding her baby obsession, he leaves for New York without sharing his plans. He scouts a hard rock band, whose manager holds wild parties in Kyle's suite and gets him hooked on drugs. When Amanda and Ryan come to Kyle's rescue, she sees women coming out of his room and assumes that he is cheating on her. She throws him out of the apartment. Lexi gives up on Peter after he wishes her well and urges her to move on with her life. She offers to make Megan a partner in her company if she can find Lexi the perfect mate. Jane and Michael call off the divorce, but face huge legal bills. A patient that Michael saved gives him a sports car and offers him an opportunity at a million-dollar investment (or so he says).
212	14	"I Married a Jock Murderer"	Tracy Lynch Britton	Carol Mendelsohn	January 18, 1999	2398204	9.31
Eve and Ryan try to reunite Kyle and Amanda. Kyle tells Amanda that her unreasonable expectations have destroyed him. Ryan becomes suspicious of Megan's irregular hours. He sees her interviewing one of Lexi's potential dates and assumes that she has returned to prostitution. Michael embezzles $100,000 from the children's charity fund to invest with Perry. Perry vanishes with the money, and Michael learns that he is a con artist who feigns heart trouble to win the trust of wealthy doctors. Michael covers his tracks by volunteering to serve as the charity's treasurer. Kyle forces Eve to sing with Rikki G's band. The group's disgusting behavior prompts her to quit. A drunken Kyle tells Peter about Eve's murder conviction and long prison sentence.
213	15	"A Fist Full of Secrets"	Robert J. Metoyer	Kris Dobkin	January 25, 1999	2398205	8.15
Peter travels to Oakhurst to investigate Eve's past. He has a run-in with Kent's parents and the town sheriff, but an old friend of Eve's tells him the truth about the murder case. Eve comes looking for Peter, and he defends her from the townspeople's attacks. Ryan intercepts a drug delivery for Kyle and pushes his brother into flushing the pills. Kyle, Eve and Peter separately accuse Amanda of being a tyrant. Overcome with guilt, she takes Kyle back for some reason. Megan conceals the fact that a computer program pinpointed Ryan as Lexi's perfect mate. Ryan discovers that Megan has her own 800 number. He confronts her with allegations of prostitution, so she comes clean about Lexi's search for Mr. Right. Temporary chief-of-staff Michael promotes Amy to head nurse. A wacko nurse whom Michael had just met claims that he promised her the job in exchange for sex. Peter suspends Michael.
214	16	"The Younger Son Also Rises"	Joel J. Feigenbaum	Antoinette Stella	February 8, 1999	2398206	8.42
Kyle and Ryan's abusive father, Mack, surprises his sons with a visit. Mack enrages Ryan with his demeaning and hateful comments, then turns on Kyle after learning that he cannot have children. Unable to cope with the pressure, Ryan and Kyle flee Kyle's birthday party and get into a fight that ends in the pool. Kyle attacks his father after he belittles him and reveals his condition to Ryan. Amanda mends her relationships with Eve and Peter. Lexi jumps to conclusions when she sees Amanda and Peter at a hotel while Eve is out of town for a gig. Audrey sues Michael for sexual harassment, and the hospital refuses to support him. Jane shuns Michael following a surprising meeting with Audrey. Michael and Audrey have a secret rendezvous. Lexi sabotages a Valentine's Day date with one of her love candidates. Megan resigns from the project. Lexi gains access to Megan's records and discovers that Ryan is her perfect mate.
215	17	"Saving Ryan's Privates"	Rob Estes	Charles Pratt, Jr.	February 15, 1999	2398207	8.20
Kyle flies into a drug-induced rage and burns down his and Amanda's dream house. He tells Amanda that he is sterile and disappears. Ryan finds him drinking at the basketball courts and brings him home. Kyle injures himself while Amanda is out, and Peter recommends that he check into a rehab center. Amanda fires Rikki G and the band, prompting a furious Eve to quit. Rikki G tries to rape Amanda, but Peter comes to the rescue. Audrey's sexual harassment allegations are part of a scam engineered by Michael. She is to recant her story in exchange for a share of his winnings in a countersuit against the hospital. Audrey refuses to follow through until Michael agrees to a sexual relationship. She secretly videotapes their encounters. Lexi pursues Jane and Ryan to a Mexican resort, where they are trying to land an account. Jane sprains her ankle and returns home to reunite with the "innocent" Michael. Lexi impulsively kisses Ryan, but apologizes for acting rashly.
216	18	"They Shoot Blanks, Don't They?"	Charles Correll	James Kahn	February 22, 1999	2398208	9.23
Eve is jealous of the amount of time Peter is spending with Amanda. She skips a meeting with her parole officer, and is arrested for performing at an illegal after-hours club. Ryan catches Peter and Amanda in an embrace, and learns of their supposed hotel rendezvous from Lexi. Amanda tells Peter that she is pregnant. Eve overhears this, and races to the rehab clinic to tell Kyle. Kyle breaks out of rehab and goes ballistic, destroying everything in sight and trying to kill Peter. When Amanda tries to stop him, he accidentally throws her through a second-story window. Michael receives a two-million-dollar settlement from the hospital. He insults Audrey on television, so she decides to send her illicit videos to Peter. Ryan and Lexi collaborate on an ad campaign, and hold a drinking contest to determine who will use it. They end up having sex in a closet, and miss their deadline. Dr. Visconti advises Lexi to be less aggressive in her pursuit of men.
217	19	"How Amanda Got Her Groove Back"	Anson Williams	Carol Mendelsohn & Cynthia J. Cohen	March 1, 1999	2398209	9.05
Amanda is not seriously injured, but loses the baby. Kyle refuses to acknowledge that the child was his, and leaves Peter to break the news. Eve vanishes, and her parole officer warns Peter that she could be arrested unless she resurfaces. Eve stays on the boat of her former cellmate, Jackie. They plan to sail away to Mexico, but Jackie tips off Peter, who convinces Eve to return home. Kyle decides to run away to Boston. Peter discovers that Kyle is not sterile. He has Amanda flown to the airport in a chopper so that she can stop Kyle from leaving. Peter and Jane see the tapes of Michael with Audrey. Jane dumps him again, and buys the beach house with a loan from her father. Peter takes pity on his partner and lets him keep his job. Lexi learns that Ryan has been engaged three times. She pressures Megan to propose in the hopes of exploiting Ryan's fear of commitment.
218	20	"Unpleasantville"	Jefferson Kibbee	Jule Selbo	March 8, 1999	2398210	9.03
Kyle and Amanda are anxious to speed up the construction on their house, but learn that it will cost them. Amanda cannot afford to bring the apartment building up to code, so she decides to sell it. Kyle joins the construction crew for the house and offers to help Jane fix up the beach house. He helps her chase away a persistent but dorky neighbor. Dr. Shulman and the hospital's new corporate ownership try to stop Michael and Peter from treating uninsured patients. Jackie is assaulted by her boss. Dr. Shulman overhears Eve discussing her prison background with Jackie. She vows to use Eve's past to destroy Peter's reputation. Jackie holds Dr. Shulman at gunpoint, but Peter stops her from killing her. Jackie steals Dr. Shulman's car, then turns herself in, as she cannot handle life on the outside. Michael begins pursuing Megan. Lexi tries to goad Megan into popping the question to Ryan, but he beats her to the punch. He suddenly leaves town. Ryan goes to a boarding house in Poughkeepsie to visit his young daughter, Sarah.
219	21	"Ryan's Choice"	Charles Correll	James Kahn	April 5, 1999	2398211	7.90
Ryan visits with his daughter; but Terry O'Brien, her aunt and legal guardian, cuts short their time together. Ryan heads home and immediately tells Megan that he slept with Lexi in Mexico. He purposely drives her away, and also alienates Lexi with his bizarre behavior. Megan confronts Lexi and quits her job. Michael agrees to team up with Lexi after his ploy to win back Megan fails. Ryan vanishes for several days before Kyle finds him at the blacktop courts. Ryan reveals that he was married as an 18-year-old. His family was in a car accident; he pulled his infant daughter to safety, but the car erupted in flames and killed his wife. He is still wracked with guilt, and has kept a promise to Sarah by never remarrying. The parole board plans to send Eve back to prison for fraternizing with Jackie, but Amanda comes to her rescue. Peter and Eve fly to Texas to consider a bid on his father's old land. He returns home to defend himself against Dr. Shulman's attacks, but winds up resigning. Eve discovers that oil was found on Mr. Howell's property, and leases it to an oil company for millions. Despite his new windfall, Peter decides to stay at the hospital to protect the interests of patients and staff. Amanda neglects Kyle to spend all her time at the office. A storm washes out the road and forces him to sleep over at Jane's house. They have a candlelight dinner during a power outage.
220	22	"McBride's Head Revisited"	Chip Chalmers	Charles Pratt, Jr.	April 12, 1999	2398212	6.88
Lexi buys the apartment building, using a front so that Amanda will unwittingly accept her offer. She takes over as landlord, prompting Amanda and Kyle to move in with Jane temporarily. Michael and Lexi drug Ryan, then snoop in his apartment and find information about his trip to New York. They pose as a priest and nun to gain entry to the boarding school and meet Sarah. Lexi, claiming to be Megan, convinces Sarah to give Ryan permission to remarry. Megan goes to work at AWA and steals Lexi's clients. Michael stops Lexi from attacking Megan, so she agrees to join him for drinks. Ryan comes to Megan's apartment to tell him about Sarah, only to find a naked Michael hiding in the closet. Peter and Eve agree not to spend their money, but she accepts an offer to buy half of Kyle's club. Eve slaps Dr. Shulman when she continues to make trouble at the hospital. Peter buys the hospital and implements more patient-friendly policies. He allows Dr. Shulman to purchase a seat on the board of directors because he enjoys having an adversary. Jane sleeps with a prospective client, but he freaks her out by proposing marriage the next day. When he pulls his account, Amanda lashes out at Jane, who finds an ally in Kyle.
221	23	"The Daughterboy"	Anson Williams	Cynthia J. Cohen & Carol Mendelsohn	April 19, 1999	2398213	8.40
Michael and Ryan get into a scuffle, and Megan cracks Ryan over the head with a lamp. Lexi tends to Ryan's wounds and convinces him to sleep with her. Megan finally learns that Ryan has a daughter. Sarah overhears Terry threatening to keep her away from Ryan forever. Ryan decides to have Sarah come live with him. He and Lexi try to visit her, but discover that she has run away. Sarah turns up on Megan's doorstep. Amanda devotes all her time to landing the account of millionaire Tony Marlin. When Eve joins Amanda and Tony for an evening out, drunken college guys trash the club. Tony hints that he will only sign with AWA if Amanda helps him land Eve. Kyle and Jane nearly kiss and later dine together. Dr. Shulman stops interfering with hospital business after she and Dr. Visconti fall for each other.
222	24	"Bitter Homes and Guardians"	Jefferson Kibbee	Peter Dunne	April 26, 1999	2398214	7.51
Ryan learns Sarah's whereabouts and sends her to the beach house to stay with Kyle. Lexi tries to win Sarah's favor through bribery. Sarah encourages Ryan to repair his relationship with Megan. He decides to fight for custody of Sarah. After being rejected by Megan and Ryan, Michael and Lexi have sex in the laundry room. To please Tony, Amanda makes Eve the spokesperson for the cruise line. Peter is angry because the commercial conflicts with their Hawaiian vacation, but Eve appeases him by asking him to come along on the cruise. Amanda must fire half of her staff to finance the commercial. When Kyle discovers that Jane is among the casualties, he accuses Amanda of being heartless and threatens to end their marriage. Amanda and Jane quarrel over Kyle. Amanda walks out on Kyle because she believes he is trying to control her. He sells the other half of the club to Eve so that he can buy Amanda's stake in their house. Amanda comes to the club to seek Kyle's forgiveness, but they break up for good.
223	25	"Floral Knowledge"	Charles Correll	Jule Selbo & Antoinette Stella	May 3, 1999	2398215	8.30
Tony orders Amanda to distract Peter throughout the cruise so that he can put the moves on Eve. Amanda accompanies Peter on a day trip to an island and ensures that they miss the boat. Tony tells Eve that Amanda promised her to him as part of their deal. Eve causes him great pain, and later ends her friendship with Amanda. Peter and Amanda sleep together and confess that they have never gotten over each other. Lexi decides to seduce Tony to steal his account, much to Michael's dismay. Ignoring a threat from Tony's unstable wife, she destroys the film from Amanda's commercial, before coming on to Tony and asking him to keep her in mind as a second choice. Terry has a social worker take Sarah away from Ryan. Ryan defends Terry against allegations of child abuse. Terry allows Ryan to have custody of Sarah, but will stay with them for the summer. Megan notices that Terry seems a bit too affectionate toward Ryan. Kyle and Jane move very quickly in their relationship.
224	26	"Lexi Gets Stiffed"	Robert J. Metoyer	Carol Mendelsohn & Cynthia J. Cohen	May 10, 1999	2398216	7.84
Amanda loses Tony's account because the commercial footage was destroyed. She decides to shut down her agency. Peter ends his marriage so that he can be with Amanda. Jane and Kyle nearly split up because of his insistence on consoling Amanda. He catches Amanda and Peter sharing a hotel room, and Eve overhears this information. Eve beds Travis, the ex-prison guard who harassed her, but he refuses to do her dirty work. She goes totally psycho and plots revenge against everyone. A jealous Michael tries to stop Lexi from sleeping with Tony. He helps her escape a potential confrontation with Mrs. Marlin. Tony comes to Lexi's apartment to close the deal, but dies in her bed. Terry lusts after Ryan, who is initially oblivious to her advances. He finally tells her that he is not interested and proposes to Megan.
225	27	"Dead Men Don't Shut Up"	J. Benjamin Chulay	James Kahn	May 17, 1999	2398217	7.82
Lexi fears that the police will accuse her of killing Tony and forging his signature on the contracts. Michael helps her dodge suspicion by returning the body to Tony's mansion. Michael asks Lexi to marry him. Lexi befriends Eve in the hopes of gathering dirt on Amanda. Eve experiences flashbacks about high school, and recalls that Amanda and Kent were lovers. Dr. Visconti puts her under hypnosis to trigger her memories. Lexi takes Eve to the murder site, where she realizes that Kent did not die from his fall; Amanda beat him to death and tricked her into accepting blame. Megan catches a naked Terry kissing Ryan. She wants to call off the engagement, but Terry apologizes and admits that she caught Ryan by surprise. Terry pretends to leave town, and Ryan and Megan get married. Terry kidnaps Sarah and crashes her car into a utility pole. Jane discovers that she is pregnant, but doesn't tell Kyle.
226	28	"Asses to Ashes"	Charles Pratt, Jr.	Charles Pratt, Jr.	May 24, 1999	2398218	10.36
Series Finale. Sarah and Terry escape serious injury because of the airbags, and Kyle and Ryan pull them to safety. Terry apologizes and grants Ryan and Megan permission to raise Sarah. Amanda tells Peter that she killed Kent, but claims that it was self defense. Lexi wants to go to the police with Eve's revelations about Amanda. Eve hits her over the head and leaves her bound and gagged in the bathtub (in her underwear). She reveals that she plans to murder Amanda and Peter. Eve tries to deflect suspicion by pretending that she is over Peter and insisting that her repressed memories were just fantasies. Dr. Shulman has Peter investigated for fraud and embezzlement, as his efforts to cover for Michael left him holding the evidence. He and Amanda plan to flee the country to escape prosecution. Kyle is thrilled to learn of Jane's pregnancy, but she discovers that Michael is the father. She tells Megan that she is leaving town. Amanda overhears this from a bathroom stall and warns Kyle as she stops by to say goodbye. Kyle stops Jane from leaving, and they agree to raise the baby as their own. Eve, posing as Lexi, knocks out Michael and leaves him in the bathtub with Lexi. She tries to run over Amanda and Peter. Lexi is arrested, and Michael joins her out of sympathy. She identifies Eve as the culprit, and Amanda confesses to Kent's murder. Dr. Visconti agrees to give Peter and Amanda the use of his cabin. Michael tries to wed Lexi in the pool. She calls it off because she fears she would cheat on him in a few months. Shulman and the police force Visconti to reveal Peter and Amanda's location. As Michael approaches the cabin to negotiate, it explodes. Kyle notices that a necklace he had given Amanda (which she never removed) was not among her personal effects. Eve shows up at the funeral and talks about how Amanda and Peter ruined her life. When Lexi objects, Eve dumps Peter's ashes over her and gets arrested. Michael is appointed chief-of-staff through a clause in Peter's will. He also mentions that he has come into a lot of money. Kyle receives the necklace anonymously through the mail; Amanda had promised to return it as a gift for his daughter. Peter and Amanda tie the knot in an island ceremony. They paid Michael one million dollars to help with their plan, which included placing cadavers from the medical school in the cabin and switching dental records.
