= Open Your Eyes (2008 film) =

- Open Your Eyes movie poster
- Directed by: Susan Cohen
- Written by: Susan Cohen
- Produced by: David Newsom; Amy Sommer; Alisa Wiegers
- Starring: Traci Dinwiddie; Suzy Nakamura; Eric Lange; Teresa Huang
- Cinematography: Stephanie Martin
- Edited by: Steven Ansell
- Music by: Wolfram de Marco; Leslie Stevens (of Leslie and the Badgers)
- Distributed by: American Film Institute
- Release date: 2008
- Running time: 14 minutes
- Country: United States
- Language: English

Open Your Eyes is a 2008 short film written and directed by Susan Cohen.

== Synopsis ==
Struggling to come to terms with her life and husband (Eric Lange) after breast cancer, Julia (Traci Dinwiddie) gets more than she bargained for when she attends a bridal shower and finds herself locked in a bathroom with Kat (Suzy Nakamura) - the frank-talking sister of the bride-to-be (Teresa Huang).

== Festivals and awards ==
Awards

- American Film Institute Jean Picker Firstenberg Award for Excellence DWW 2008
- Palm Springs International ShortFest 2008 - the Alexis Award for Most Promising Student Filmmaker
- Anchorage International Film Festival 2008 - best short film
- Canada International Film Festival 2009 - best director
- Beverly Hills Shorts Festival 2009 - best drama, best film, best director, and best actress for Traci Dinwiddie
- Vail Film Festival 2009 - best student film
- WorldFest Houston International Film Festival 2009 - Platinum Remi Award for Graduate Level Student Productions
- West Chester Film Festival 2009 - best student film
- 42nd Humboldt Film Festival 2009 - the Jim DeMulling Speak Out Award and honorable mention best narrative
- Santa Cruz Film Festival 2009 - Audience Award for Best Student Work
- British Film Festival Los Angeles 2009 - best student film and best actress short film for Traci Dinwiddie
- Iowa Independent Film Festival 2009 - best student film
- Action on Film International Film Festival 2009 - best actress short film for Traci Dinwiddie
- Mexico International Film Festival 2009 - Golden Palm Winner - student film

Nominations

- Milan International Film Festival 2009 - best short film
- Method Fest Independent Film Festival 2009 - best actress short film for Traci Dinwiddie
- British Film Festival Los Angeles 2009 - best supporting actress short film for Suzy Nakamura
- Little Rock Film Festival 2009 - best short film
- Action on Film International Film Festival 2009 - best supporting actress short film for Suzy Nakamura and best female filmmaker short film category for Susan Cohen

Selected festival screenings

- 40th Nashville Film Festival - April, 2009
- Little Rock Film Festival - May, 2009
