= RT N' The 44s =

RT N' THE 44s
- Origin: Los Angeles, California, United States
- Genres: Folk noir
- Years active: 2009–present
- Label: Rabid Rabbit Records
- Members: RT Valine-Wood n' Wire; Michael "Swimmy" Webb-Washboard; Brendan Willard-Banjobass
- Website: official website

RT N' THE 44s is a folk noir band created by singer/songwriter RT Valine. Founded in 2009, the band originated in Los Angeles, CA alongside local bands Leslie and the Badgers, Spindrift, Gwendolyn (artist), and Ruthann Friedman. Using instruments crafted from tin, 2x4's and salvaged parts, RT has stated that RT N' THE 44s was born out of "an attempt to make listenable music from junk". They have been described as a "vintage country band with dark obsessions".

The band is often seen busking at various locations throughout Los Angeles and Pasadena in the tradition of Woody Guthrie and Cisco Houston. As members of the New LA Folkfest the band has performed with John C. Reilly, Tom Brosseau, T-Model Ford, and Red Simpson, among other notable acts. RT N' THE 44s performs annually at The Roots Roadhouse Festival and Autry National Center. The band has recorded three full-length albums for the independent label Rabid Rabbit Records, and has been featured "live in studio" on KUCI's Freedom Radio Program.

== Discography ==
=== Albums ===
- RT N' The 44s (2011)
- March Of The Fools (2011)
- Drunk At Dawn (2011)
- Ramble On (2012)
- Love Is A Dog (2013)
- End Of The Heart (2014)
- Ain't Enough Whiskey (2014)
- Oklahoma (2016)
- Snakes / Eden (2020)

=== EPs ===
- Long Way From Home (2013)
- No. 9 (2014)
- Radio EP (2019)

=== Live albums ===
- Heart In A Jar (Live At The Escondite) (2015)

=== Cover albums ===
- 6 Songs Of Christmas (2017)

=== Compilation albums ===
- Most Wanted (2013)
- Both Hands On The Bottle (2017)
- Memories Of Eden (2020)
