= Melrose Place season 6 =

Melrose Place
- Season 6
- Starring: Linden Ashby Thomas Calabro David Charvet Rob Estes Brooke Langton Jamie Luner Alyssa Milano Lisa Rinna Kelly Rutherford Doug Savant Andrew Shue Jack Wagner Special guest star: Heather Locklear as Amanda
- No. of episodes: 34

Release
- Original network: Fox
- Original release: September 8, 1997 – September 7, 1998

Season chronology
- ← Previous; Season 5 Next → Season 7

The sixth season of Melrose Place, an American television series, premiered on Fox on September 8, 1997. The season six finale aired on September 7, 1998, after 34 episodes.

The season was produced by Chip Hayes, supervising producer James Kahn, co-executive producers Carol Mendelsohn and Charles Pratt, Jr., and executive producers Aaron Spelling, E. Duke Vincent and Frank South.

The season was released on DVD as two-volume box sets under the title of Melrose Place - The Sixth Season: Volumes One and Two. The first volume being released on May 3, 2011 and the latter volume being released on July 19, 2011 by Paramount Home Video.

== Storylines ==
At the beginning of the sixth season, the show's ratings steadily fell. During most of the first half of the season, Heather Locklear's pregnancy was hidden from viewers with most of Amanda's scenes showing her from the chest up or hidden by props.

The day after Sydney's death Craig blames Samantha, but he later apologizes. In the season opener, Michael recommends Matt for a job at an AIDS clinic and Matt moves to San Francisco with his niece Chelsea. Before leaving, he says that he wanted to say goodbye to everyone but "nobody's home".

Two new characters are violent, vindictive Dr. Brett "Coop" Cooper (Linden Ashby) and his seductive ex-wife, snobbish heiress Lexi Sterling (Jamie Luner). The season focuses on Kyle and Amanda's troubled relationship; Amanda returns to her nasty ways after starting her own agency, Amanda Woodward Advertising. With Jake Hanson gone after selling Shooters, Kyle (backed by Amanda) opens the Upstairs Jazz Club and the bar becomes the group's new hangout. Amanda and Kyle's ex-wife, Taylor, continue their rivalry over him.

Kyle ignores warnings from Jennifer, Michael and Taylor that Amanda is untrustworthy and incapable of love. Amanda's mentor from a New York advertising agency, Eric Baines (Jeffrey Nordling), arrives in Los Angeles for a visit and tries to seduce her. When Amanda spurns his advances, Eric purchases the building with Kyle's restaurant and the jazz club to shut them down. Amanda then agrees to Eric's proposition, keeping it a secret. When Kyle finds out, he attacks Eric and threatens to kill him; Eric then returns their property and leaves town. However, Kyle is angry with Amanda for keeping Eric's proposition a secret and agreeing to it.

Billy and Samantha become engaged, and he asks Craig to be his best man. The couple have a falling-out after Samantha's old friend, Connie (Megan Ward), arrives in town. Although they reconcile and marry, Billy soon cheats on Samantha with Jennifer. Despite the affair, Billy is committed to making his marriage work. Samantha begins an affair with Jeff Baylor (Dan Gauthier), a minor-league baseball player.

Jennifer tries to attract Craig, who is grieving for Sydney, and he agrees to a physical relationship. Craig enters a business partnership with Michael for a mechanical surgical glove, an idea Michael stole from Cooper. Michael betrays Craig, using Jennifer to break up with him so Michael could dissolve the partnership and keep all the profits.

Craig attacks Jennifer after Michael ruins him, but she is helped by Billy after Billy destroys Craig's new advertising company. Craig escapes, steals Jennifer's car and commits suicide.

Peter ends his romance with Taylor after learning that she cooperated with Michael to trick him into thinking he had epilepsy and unseat him at chief of staff at Wilshire Hospital. Taylor tries to win Kyle back, pretending to be pregnant with his baby and asking Michael to impregnate her to make her story believable. She becomes pregnant, has a change of heart and tries to attract Michael, her baby's father.

Kyle is confronted with the return of Christine, his former Gulf War partner who was reported missing in action (and presumed dead) in Iraq, and Amanda is jealous of their friendship. When Christine attempts suicide before Kyle and Amanda's wedding, he abandons Amanda to save her. It is later revealed that Christine is not actually Christine, but she is actually Tiffany Hart (Susan Walters), a woman who Nick hired to pretend to be Christine (telling Kyle she had reconstructive surgery). In the psychiatric ward of Wilshire Hospital Tiffany is manipulated by Nick (another war buddy of Kyle's) and the jealous Taylor. After "Christine" sends another suicide letter to Amanda, Amanda visits her and threatens to kill her.

Tiffany (as Christine) escapes from the hospital to find Kyle and Amanda and tell them the truth about Nick and Taylor. However, Nick runs Tiffany into Kyle's car, accidentally killing her, and he and Taylor bring her dead body to a railway line. After their wedding Kyle and Amanda receive a desperate letter from "Christine", and rush to the railway to rescue her. They are too late; she is "killed" by a train. Amanda, guilty about Tiffany/Christine's "suicide", breaks up with Kyle.

Peter begins a romance with Cooper's ex-wife, Lexi, who asks for his help getting more alimony from her ex-husband (who had a brief affair with Kimberly Shaw when she was recovering in Ohio years earlier). Lexi is addicted to antidepressants, and Peter saves her from a lethal overdose. Her father, who disapproves of her relationship with Peter, dies of a stroke during an argument with him. Blaming Peter, Lexi breaks up with him and reconciles with Cooper (who tries to help her run her late father's business).

Michael faces off with Cooper, who tried to ruin his life because of Kimberly's death. Megan divorces Michael over his manipulation in unseating Peter as the hospital's chief-of-staff and begins a relationship with Cooper. Fired from the hospital, Michael opens a clinic in a poor Los Angeles neighborhood and avenges Megan and Cooper by ruining their plans to move to Philadelphia. He reconciles with Peter after saving his life when they were fishing, regaining part of the Burns-Mancini practice and his job at Wilshire.

== Cast ==
=== Main cast members ===
In alphabetical order

- Linden Ashby as Dr. Brett Cooper
- Thomas Calabro as Michael Mancini
- David Charvet as Craig Field (episodes 1–17)
- Rob Estes as Kyle McBride
- Brooke Langton as Samantha Reilly
- Jamie Luner as Lexi Sterling (episodes 4–34)
- Alyssa Milano as Jennifer Mancini
- Lisa Rinna as Taylor McBride
- Kelly Rutherford as Megan Lewis
- Doug Savant as Matt Fielding (episode 1)
- Andrew Shue as Billy Campbell
- Jack Wagner as Peter Burns

=== Special guest star ===
- Heather Locklear as Amanda Woodward

=== Recurring guest stars ===
- Dan Gauthier as Jeff Baylor
- Josie Bissett as Jane Mancini
- Jeffrey Nordling as Eric Baines
- Susan Walters as Christine Denton
- Scott Plank as Nick Reardon
- Megan Ward as Connie Rexroth
- Katie Wright as Chelsea Fielding
- Chad Everett as Thomas Sterling
- Anthony Tyler Quinn as Rory Blake
- Joanna Cassidy as Kate Reilly
- Valerie Harper as Mia Mancini
- Cliff DeYoung as George Larner
- Tracy Fraim as Bob Matthews

== Episodes ==
No. overall	No. in season	Title	Directed by	Written by	Original release date	Prod. code	U.S. viewers (millions)
165	1	"A Brand New Day"	Frank South	Frank South	September 8, 1997	2397158	10.69
Peter proposes to Taylor and intentionally leaves her at the altar as revenge for her rage epilepsy setup. Back in Los Angeles, Peter tells Michael that he will get revenge. In Cleveland, Dr. Brett Cooper vows to avenge Kimberly’s death, which he attributes to Michael. Upon joining the Wilshire Memorial staff, Coop offers to set Michael up with a hand surgeon. Sydney dies of her injuries. Billy and Sam say they love each other after Sam is released from police custody. Craig swears revenge on Billy for Sydney’s death and rejects Sam’s apology. Sam becomes convinced that her father has poisoned her with evil and paints herself in Hell. Amanda turns down a job with her mentor Eric Baines in New York to stay with Kyle and the Upstairs, while Jennifer is frustrated by Amanda’s return. Elsewhere, Jennifer comforts a grieving Craig. Matt gets a residency at an AIDS clinic in San Francisco and moves out of the complex. Alyssa Milano is made a series regular as Jennifer Mancini. First appearance of Linden Ashby as Dr. Brett Cooper. Final appearance of Doug Savant as Matt Fielding, although his off-screen death would be the plot of a Season 7 episode.
166	2	"The Trojan Stork"	Charles Correll	Charles Pratt, Jr.	September 15, 1997	2397159	10.27
Michael agrees to give back Peter’s job after recovery in exchange for Peter keeping Michael as a partner, as brokered by Megan. Elsewhere, Michael suggests that Coop stash his assets in the practice. Taylor tells Kyle that the baby is his, and he promises to support Taylor during her pregnancy, angering Amanda. Taylor tells Peter that her fake pregnancy is the perfect opportunity to break up Amanda and Kyle and later blackmails Michael into finding her a sperm bank to get pregnant. Billy encourages Amanda to start her own ad agency. Amanda and Kyle admit that they love each other. Jennifer and a grieving Craig sleep together after Jennifer comforts him. Later, Craig rejects another apology from Sam and attempts to run her down with his car, at which point they finally reconcile.
167	3	"No Time for Sperm Banks"	Jefferson Kibbee	Carol Mendelsohn	September 22, 1997	2397160	10.16
Peter tells Billy not to share his plans regarding Amanda’s agency, but not before Billy tells Sam. When Craig finds Billy’s file on Amanda Woodward Advertising, Sam spills the beans and Craig fires Billy for lying about helping Amanda. Amanda rejects Peter’s funding offer, and Kyle is frustrated when Eric agrees to fund Amanda’s agency. Peter is angered to find Coop is a new partner in Burns/Mancini; Michael apologizes to Coop and tells him they’ll push out Peter. Megan and Michael begin couples’ therapy, where they agree to be truthful to each other for 48 hours. Michael misses a date with Megan after the sperm bank suffers a flood and Taylor insists on sleeping with Michael to get pregnant. Megan finds Coop’s medical file on Kimberly and Coop lies about his reasons for moving to Los Angeles. At Kyle’s, Coop and Peter toast to being anti-Michael.
168	4	"The Doctor Is In...Deep"	Anson Williams	James Kahn	September 29, 1997	2397161	10.62
Billy is angered after Sam confesses to telling Craig about Amanda’s plans. While they later reconcile, Billy rejects Sam’s marriage proposal, leading her to disappear. Eric finances Amanda’s new office and pressures Craig’s banks to pull out of Sky High. Later, Eric attends the opening of Amanda Woodward Advertising and tells Amanda he has moved to L.A. When Lexi tells Coop she’s coming to L.A. to settle their divorce, Coop asks Peter to attend a medical conference in Santa Barbara in his stead. Coop encourages Megan to visit Michael at the conference. At the conference, Peter nearly sleeps with a woman he meets at the bar and Michael divides his time between Taylor and Megan, both of whom surprised him at the conference. Back in L.A., Taylor becomes convinced she is pregnant, while Peter learns that the woman he met is Lexi and they sleep together. Elsewhere, Coop calls Mrs. Shaw to provide an update. First appearance of Jamie Luner as Lexi Sterling.
169	5	"Desperately Seeking Samantha"	Chip Chalmers	Neil Landau	October 20, 1997	2397162	9.99
Amanda Woodward Advertising opens its office. Megan returns her wedding ring after catching Michael and Taylor in bed, and Taylor warns Michael not to tell Megan the truth. Kyle demands a paternity test after Jennifer tells him about Taylor, which Michael agrees to help fake if Taylor tells Megan she drugged Michael into sex. Eric lies to Amanda that he doesn’t want a relationship and invites Megan for a drink after breaking up her fight with Michael at the Upstairs. Billy travels to Maryland to win back Sam, where Sam tells him to go back to L.A. and Mrs. Reilly threatens him with a shotgun. Mr. Andrews visits to give something to Craig but leaves when he sees Jennifer exit Craig’s bedroom. Later, Jennifer explains Craig’s grief to Mr. Andrews, who gives Craig an insurance check from Sydney’s policy. Jennifer is disappointed when Craig says he’ll use the money to become a man of leisure. Lexi tells Peter about Coop’s affair in Cleveland.
170	6	"The Light At the End of the Tumble"	Charles Correll	Cynthia J. Cohen	October 27, 1997	2397163	10.28
Peter learns that Coop’s affair was with Kimberly. Megan resigns from Burns/Mancini/Cooper. Coop tells Michael about his idea for a cauterizer glove, which Michael quickly patents and forms a business with Craig to manufacture (at Jennifer’s urging). Peter gives Lexi a copy of Coop’s accounting records. Jennifer comforts Kyle after he loses the lease to his Boston restaurant. Taylor falls down the stairs during a fight with Amanda and “loses” the baby. Megan and Eric enjoy their first date, and Eric notices Amanda watching from her window when he takes Megan home. Billy says goodbye to Sam, but after he leaves, Mrs. Reilly apologizes to Sam for not protecting her from Jim and trying to start over. Upon his return to Los Angeles, Billy finds Sam at the apartment. Sam later gets hired as a graphic artist at Amanda Woodward Advertising and accepts Billy’s marriage proposal.
171	7	"Secrets and Wives"	Jefferson Kibbee	Antoinette Stella	November 3, 1997	2397164	9.88
Eric hires Megan as a mentee and purposely kisses her in front of Amanda, upsetting Megan. Kyle suspects Eric as the buyer after the restaurant building is sold and their lease becomes monthly. Eric tells Megan that he only wants a piece of arm candy, not a relationship. Later, Eric gives Amanda an ultimatum: her ad agency or a relationship with Kyle. Craig gives Jennifer 24 hours to convince Michael to do business his way. Jennifer flirts with a scientist and switches the labels on a working and faulty version of the glove. During a demonstration, the faulty glove electrocutes a pharmaceutical executive, pushing Michael to accept Craig’s business terms. Mrs. Shaw surprises Coop in Los Angeles and offers her assistance. A judge rules in favor of Lexi in the divorce settlement. While initially planning to return to Cleveland, Lexi first visits the complex, where Peter professes his love for her in front of Coop.
172	8	"A Shot in the Dark"	Anson Williams	Frank South	November 10, 1997	2397165	10.55
Amanda tells Kyle that Eric purchased his Boston restaurant. Eric purchases the Kyle’s Restaurant and Upstairs building and gives Kyle 30 days to vacate. Amanda rejects Eric’s offer to stop his campaign against Kyle in exchange for one night of sex; Megan quits as Eric’s mentee in protest. When Megan tells Taylor about the offer, Taylor suggests to Amanda that she accept the offer or she’ll tell Kyle. Coop tells Peter that he doesn’t mind the Lexi/Peter relationship. Lexi takes tranquilizers after promising to be honest with Peter. Michael begins finding Kimberly’s belongings around the hospital and office and has Coop arrested after learning about the Kimberly/Coop affair. After getting a phone call summoning him to the beach house, a shadowy figures fires a gun at Michael. After arguing about their wedding costs, Billy relents and puts on a down payment on Sam’s wedding gown. Jennifer flirts her way into glove sales at a medical supplies convention and Craig later rewards her with a new car.
173	9	"Attack of the Scalpel Woman"	Chip Chalmers	Charles Pratt, Jr.	November 17, 1997	2397166	10.24
Peter bails Coop out of jail, and Michael realizes he could not have been the gunman. Coop tells Megan not to be corrupted by Michael. After Megan and Michael notice a gun in Coop’s bag, they follow Coop to the airport where they confront Mrs. Shaw as she leaves for Cleveland. Coop refills Lexi’s tranquilizer prescription after she runs out of pills and experiences withdrawal symptoms. After Coop warns Michael that Mrs. Shaw did not disembark in Cleveland, Mrs. Shaw attacks Michael with a scalpel in the OR, accidentally stabbing Megan, who slips into a coma after an allergic reaction to the surgical anesthetic. Eric sets a deadline on his offer to Amanda. Taylor tells Kyle about the offer after Amanda leaves the Upstairs under false pretenses. Enraged, Kyle breaks into Eric’s hotel room, catching him in bed with Amanda, and pushes Eric off the balcony, leaving him hanging by his fingers. Jennifer and Craig join Billy and Sam on a double date. Sam’s maid of honor, Connie, arrives in LA, secretly vowing to ruin the marriage. Jennifer is upset when she notices another woman leaving Craig’s apartment on the morning after Billy’s bachelor party.
174	10	"My Little Coma Girl"	Charles Correll	Carol Mendelsohn	November 24, 1997	2397167	10.70
Kyle pulls Eric off the balcony after Eric admits to not sleeping with Amanda, but Kyle still breaks up with Amanda. Kyle rejects Taylor’s flirtations. Eric apologizes to Amanda and signs over Kyle’s restaurant and jazz club to her. Kyle assaults Eric after Eric lies that he did sleep with Amanda. Coop prevents Michael from visiting Megan and begins playing music for Megan. Peter and Lexi tell Michael that Coop is repeating his treatment of Kimberly with Megan. After Michael has security remove Coop from Megan’s room, Megan wakes up and Michael lies that he had been caring for her. Megan agrees to recover at the beach house. Peter becomes suspicious of Lexi’s cheery mood and later finds tranquilizers prescribed to her by Coop. Craig tells Billy that he regrets his treatment of Jennifer. Connie asks Sam if she’s sure about marriage. At the wedding, Sam angers Mrs. Campbell and Billy by refusing to wear a Campbell family brooch, and Sam walks out of the reception crying after Mrs. Campbell continues to discuss Alison and Brooke. Billy reassures Sam that he loves her.
175	11	"Everybody Comes to Kyle's"	Jefferson Kibbee	James Kahn	December 1, 1997	2397168	9.75
Megan and Michael recommit to each other until Coop tells Megan the truth about who cared for her during her coma, which Jennifer and Peter corroborate. Coop serves the Mancini Glove Company with a lawsuit for stealing his idea. Jennifer and Craig clash over commitment but agree to be friends with benefits. Peter agrees to hire Lexi as his interior designer and later observes Lexi taking more pills. Later, Peter agrees to downplay Megan’s recovery in exchange for letting Lexi decorate the Glove Company offices. When Peter confronts Lexi about her drug addiction, she drives off in a hurry with Peter in tow. After colliding with an unknown object, Peter finds blood on the headlight. As Amanda and Kyle’s relationship deteriorates, Taylor successfully orchestrates a purchase of Amanda’s share in the Upstairs. Amanda hires Connie as a temp worker, and Connie convinces Amanda to send Sam on a Seattle business trip. Billy and Sam enjoy a Hawaii honeymoon before leaving for Los Angeles and Seattle, respectively. After Billy returns home, Connie lies to Sam that Billy is still not home and questions his fidelity.
176	12	"A Bump in the Night"	Charles Correll	Cynthia J. Cohen	December 15, 1997	2397169	8.76
Peter finds Bob, the victim of Lexi’s hit and run, and lies to the police about the accident. Lexi visits Bob in the hospital and realizes that she hit him with her car; Peter convinces her to stay calm. Lexi panics when LAPD visits, and Jennifer overhears Lexi and Peter discuss their cover-up. Michael agrees to hire Lexi as an interior designer in exchange for remaining chief of staff. Coop shows Craig the evidence of Michael’s theft and tells him to stay quiet. Jennifer is angered when Craig tells the truth at his deposition. Jennifer and Michael watch Coop and Megan’s date with a hidden camera in the hopes that Coop will discuss the lawsuit. When Jennifer steps out, Coop mentions that Michael stole the idea, but Michael lies to Jennifer that Coop admitted to lying. After Sam returns from Seattle, Connie watches through the window as Billy and Sam sleep together. Back at work, Sam gets Connie hired as Billy’s assistant, against Billy’s wishes. Amanda and Kyle continue their fight, while Taylor privately vows to make Kyle love her again.
177	13	"A Tree Talks in Melrose"	Thomas Calabro	Antoinette Stella	December 22, 1997	2397170	8.25
Jennifer overhears Coop tell Lexi that he’d do anything to get her off his back. Coop agrees to drop his lawsuit if Jennifer gets Lexi to stop accepting his alimony, which Lexi agrees to in exchange for Jennifer not telling the police about Lexi’s hit-and-run. Lexi’s stress leads her to overdose on tranquilizers. Jennifer realizes that Coop is telling the truth about the glove design and tells Michael that she will no longer protect him. Megan struggles to follow through on her divorce as Michael sends her lavish Christmas gifts. Later, Coop lies to Megan’s divorce lawyers that she wants Michael served immediately. Billy confronts Connie after she kisses him under the mistletoe. Later, Billy and Sam have a brief spat after Billy asks Connie to move out. Kyle and Taylor hire their friend Jon Secada to perform at a Christmas Eve party to raise the $25,000 they need to keep their lease. At the party, Kyle rejects another apology from Amanda before blacking out, and Taylor steals the party profits. When Kyle awakens, Taylor feigns that the profit is missing and suggests a Vegas trip.
178	14	"To Kill a Whirlybird"	Charles Correll	Frank South	January 5, 1998	2397171	10.31
While Sam takes another business trip, a drunken Billy kisses Connie, who tells Sam. After Connie’s ex-girlfriend visits, Billy realizes that Connie is gay and trying to win Sam for herself. Amanda rejects another apology from Kyle before taking off in a helicopter with Sam, which crashes and seriously injures Amanda. In Vegas, Kyle and Taylor’s winning streak abruptly ends, but Taylor pretends she won the stolen money and has celebratory sex with Kyle. After Kyle learns about the helicopter crash, he returns to California. Michael vows to destroy the glove company after settling Coop’s lawsuit. Coop tricks Michael into thinking that Dr. Shulman is romantically interested in him, and after Michael forces himself onto Dr. Shulman, thinking she is playing hard to get, the hospital board removes him as chief of staff and reinstates Peter. Megan tells Coop she doesn’t want a relationship but changes her mind after Coop expresses his care for her. A guilty Lexi hires Bob as an assistant after he shows up on her doorstep with nowhere to go.
179	15	"Amanda's Back"	Charles Correll	James Kahn	January 12, 1998	2397172	10.77
Amanda and Sam are rescued from the crash site. Amanda begins receiving medical treatment and reconciles with Kyle, who tells her that she may be permanently paralyzed. Billy promises Sam that nothing happened with Connie, and Connie later comes out to Sam and admits her crush before returning to New York. Lexi is upset by Peter’s medical care for Amanda. Bob makes dinner plans with Lexi before realizing that she was the driver who hit him. Kyle tells Taylor that they’ll always be friends. Jennifer learns about Megan and Coop’s relationship and tells Michael, who confronts them. Megan and Coop agree to ignore Michael. Later, Michael visits a strip club and falls for a stripper named Amber, who gives Michael her number after he saves her from a mugger. Craig tells Jennifer that he never liked her.
180	16	"Kyle of the Desert"	Charles Pratt, Jr.	Charles Pratt, Jr.	January 19, 1998	2397173	10.38
Kyle begins dreaming about the death of Christine, a fellow Marine in the Gulf War. Amanda asks Taylor about Kyle’s Christine dreams. After finding a photo of Nick, Christine, and Kyle, Taylor calls Nick for more information. When Peter tells Kyle that Amanda plans to go to rehab in Utah, Kyle proposes to her and she accepts. Lexi and Peter fake a fight to con Bob into dropping the hit and run charges. Later, Mr. Sterling arrives for a visit and immediately dislikes Peter. Megan and Coop decide to slow down their relationship and court each other. Amber gets cold feet on her first date with Michael, and at the strip club, Coop learns of Amber’s profession as she makes another date with Michael. Amber walks out on a second date with Michael after Jennifer and Coop criticize her, but Michael later convinces her to quit her job and move in with him. Sam and Billy have a brief argument. David Charvet does not appear in this episode.
181	17	"Coop de Grace"	Chip Hayes	Chip Hayes	January 26, 1998	2397174	10.14
In Dallas, Nick tells Taylor that Christine is still alive but disfigured and that she lied to Kyle to protect his feelings. Amanda is discharged from the hospital and regains some feeling in her legs but later suffers a fall. Taylor shares the news about Christine while helping Amanda after her fall. Mr. Sterling continues to criticize Peter and later offers Lexi a job as the head of his company’s new West Coast division. At a hospital reception, Coop serves alcohol to Amber so that she will make a fool of herself and Michael. Megan walks out on Coop after Michael overhears Coop and Peter discussing his removal from the practice. Michael’s appliances are stolen by Amber. Billy and Sam attempt to woo minor league baseball player Jeff Baylor for a sporting goods campaign. Dr. Mosley warns Jennifer about Craig’s actions with unsafe manufacturing practices, and Craig attacks Jennifer after Coop removes him from the company. Later, Craig steals Jennifer’s car at gunpoint and commits suicide in despair of Sydney’s death. Final appearance of David Charvet as Craig Field.
182	18	"Mama Mia"	Thomas Calabro	Carol Mendelsohn	February 2, 1998	2397175	9.90
Michael and Jennifer’s mother Mia arrives in L.A. for a visit. Mia bails Michael out of jail after he gets beat up at the strip club looking for Amber. Later, after Mia mistakes Billy for Craig, Billy pretends to be Craig at a Mancini dinner and later kisses Jennifer. Jennifer learns about Craig’s suicide. Sam and Jeff grow closer, much to Billy’s chagrin, and Jeff tries to kiss Sam. Kyle opens up to Amanda about Christine. Taylor reveals that she intercepted a letter from Christine in Boston, meaning that she is still alive. With Amanda’s encouragement, Kyle travels to New Mexico to visit Christine. Lexi becomes suspicious when her father announces that he has made Coop her business partner. Megan asks Coop for space.
183	19	"Last Train to Baghdad"	Anson Williams	James Kahn & Frank South	February 9, 1998	2397176A	10.39
184	20	"Last Train to Baghdad"	Anson Williams	James Kahn & Frank South	February 9, 1998	2397176B	10.39
Christine tells Kyle that she lied about her death so he could continue his life. Later, Christine visits L.A. and reconciles with Kyle. Lexi refuses to believe that her father dislikes Peter, which leads him to secretly record a conversation with Lexi's father during which the father collapses and dies. Megan accidentally obtains Peter’s tape recording. Billy and Sam continue to argue, and Sam kisses Jeff as he apologizes for flirting. Mia sees Billy and Sam kissing and punches Billy before Jennifer tells the truth about Craig. Upon the advice of Spider, a gang member and ER patient, Michael opens a medical clinic in a tough neighborhood. Christine breaks down while giving a toast to Kyle and Amanda. Later, Kyle skips his wedding to save Christine from committing suicide, but Amanda says she won’t reschedule the wedding until Christine leaves. Nick visits Christine in the hospital and they make out. After Peter ignores her pleas to be honest, Megan tells Lexi the truth about her father’s death. Megan’s relationship with Coop is strained as he spends more time with Lexi. Sam and Jeff admit their feelings for each other. Jennifer encourages Sam to flirt with Jeff while offering her own counsel to Billy. Michael recruits Nurse Amy and steals hospital equipment for his clinic. Later, he reluctantly agrees to treat Spider’s gang members without reporting them to the police.
185	21	"A Swing and a Mrs."	Jefferson Kibbee	Antoinette Stella & Cynthia J. Cohen	February 16, 1998	2397177	9.77
Kyle lets Christine stay in L.A. until she recovers, but Amanda demands that Christine leave by the time she returns from a business trip. Christine angers Nick when she tells him about her plan to return home, revealing that Christine is actually dead and Nick and Taylor are using an impostor to break up Kyle and Amanda. Kyle and Christine spend her final day in California together, but Taylor and Nick stop her from leaving town. Megan gives Coop an ultimatum about his relationship with Lexi and eventually decides to moves in with him, despite her renewed interest in Michael. Coop convinces Amanda to rent Craig's former apartment to Lexi. Later, Coop learns that he will receive $10 million from Mr. Sterling’s estate if he marries Lexi in the next year. Peter learns that Mr. Sterling died from high blood pressure, but Lexi does not forgive him for the recording. Jennifer and Billy grow closer as she assists him with a campaign for a ballroom dance company, and they eventually share a kiss. Sam visits Jeff to say goodbye and sleeps with him.
186	22	"Blunt Drama"	Harvey Frost	Charles Pratt, Jr.	February 23, 1998	2397178	10.17
Taylor and Nick convince a reluctant Christine to finish their plan. Christine lies to Peter about hearing voices in her head and gets admitted to the hospital on suicide watch. Taylor manipulates Kyle by warning him how Peter is on the rebound from Peter's breakup with Lexi; by putting Christine on suicide watch, Taylor claims, Peter will keep Christine in town for longer with the intent of busting up Kyle and Amanda's engagement. Kyle confronts Peter about Christine’s admission, and Peter convinces Kyle to wed Amanda as soon as possible. After Kyle tells Taylor about his wedding plans, Taylor directs Christine to write a letter in which Christine professes her love for Kyle. When Taylor delivers the fake letter to Amanda, Amanda visits Christine and dares her to commit suicide. Nick and Taylor order Christine to break up the wedding, but she trips outside the church and dies from a head injury. Kyle and Amanda are married. Sam tells Jeff that their affair was a mistake, but when he returns from spring training with an injury, they continue their affair. Billy apologizes to Jennifer for leading her on before kissing her again. Spider dies of a gunshot wound and gifts Michael a bag of cash, which Megan convinces him to donate to a church. Coop suggests that Lexi succeed her father as company head in Cleveland.
187	23	"A Christine Runs Through It"	Charles Correll	Carol Mendelsohn	March 2, 1998	2397179	10.43
On their honeymoon, Amanda is delivered a forged suicide note from Christine, and Kyle learns that Christine escaped from the hospital. Nick and Taylor place Christine’s body on the train tracks to stage her death as a suicide. Amanda grows distant from Kyle after confessing that she dared Christine to kill herself. Kyle becomes suspicious and searches Christine’s motel room after Taylor suggests that he didn’t really know Christine. Michael rescues Taylor after Nick assaults her into staying silent about Christine’s real identity and death. Later, Michael agrees to cover for Taylor and tells Nick that Taylor died as a result of the assault. Sam tells Jennifer that she slept with Jeff again, and when Jeff invites Sam to San Diego for a night, Jennifer encourages her to go. Sam turns down an invite to Billy’s awards dinner to travel to San Diego and asks Jennifer to go with Billy in her stead. Jennifer and Billy sleep together after the dinner. In San Diego, Jeff asks Sam to leave Billy. Coop asks Peter to reunite with Lexi so he can avoid the temptation of Mr. Sterling’s offer, and later, Peter and Lexi reconcile.
188	24	"Too Romantic For Words"	Chip Chalmers	Frank South	March 9, 1998	2397180	10.75
After Jennifer confides in Megan about her affair with Billy, Megan cautions Jennifer not to assume that Jennifer loves Billy more than Sam does. Amanda bails on Kyle’s attempts at reconciliation, so he calls the office while she's working late with Sam. Although Sam tries to cover for Amanda, Kyle sees through Sam's lie and tells her to relay to Amanda how he never believed Amanda's sincerity. When Sam tries to give Amanda unsolicited advice about mending things with Kyle, Amanda threatens to expose Sam's affair with Jeff. Megan grows jealous upon noticing Coop's reaction to Peter spending the night at Lexi's apartment; after Amanda lashes out at them, Lexi stands up to Amanda for berating Peter. At the restaurant, Kyle questions Taylor about a letter from Nick apologizing for Taylor’s death and learns that Nick was in town after studying Christine’s motel phone bill. Lexi is angered when Peter leases a condo in their names and further angered when he cancels an apology dinner to help Amanda. However, Peter has a change of heart and tells Amanda he cannot help her at Lexi’s expense. Jennifer becomes upset when Billy and Sam kiss at a party. Sam tells Jennifer about Jeff’s proposal, and Jennifer advises her to leave Billy. Later, Jeff and Sam kiss over lunch, while Billy tells Jennifer that their night together meant a lot to him. Coop is angered when Megan once again helps Michael out. Later, Coop tells Megan about a job opening in Philadelphia, although Michael advises Megan not to go.
189	25	"Four Affairs and a Pregnancy"	Jefferson Kibbee	James Kahn	March 16, 1998	2397181	10.15
Amanda connects with Lexi’s old friend Rory Blake at dinner and they gradually become close, leading to a confrontation with Kyle. Kyle travels to Dallas and discovers that Taylor visited Nick. Jennifer suggests that Kyle act friendly with Taylor to uncover the truth about Christine. Taylor learns that she is pregnant. Megan is upset when Dr. Larner from Philadelphia wants to dine with Coop at the hotel where she used to engage in sex work. Later, Michael tells Dr. Larner about Coop and Megan’s pasts, and Dr. Larner begins to flirt with Megan. Megan dissuades Michael from committing insurance fraud by having the priest to whom he donated money offer to buy the clinic. Billy and Jennifer kiss while he takes an evening jog. Jeff invites Sam to a Baylor family reunion, where she is overwhelmed by Jeff’s family members believing they are engaged. At home, Sam sees Billy and Jennifer kissing through the window before apologizing to Billy and pulling him into bed.
190	26	"M.P. Confidential"	Robert J. Metoyer	Charles Pratt, Jr.	March 30, 1998	2397182	10.98
Michael tells Jennifer that Taylor is pregnant after Jennifer notices Taylor abstaining from drinking, which Jennifer relays to Kyle. Michael learns that he is the father of Taylor’s baby but lies to Taylor that the father is neither himself nor Kyle, leading her to conclude that Nick is the father. Amanda falls further into a depressive episode and invests her money with Rory, despite Rory giving off an untrustworthy vibe to Sam when Rory visits the ad agency. During an AWA concept meeting for Sterling-Conway, Rory proposes highlighting Lexi's heavy sex appeal within the ad campaign; after Sam and Billy call out Rory for his chauvanism, Lexi insists AWA compromise by creating a sexy advertisement that's more tasteful. Coop and Megan travel to Philadelphia for the final round of interviews, where Dr. Larner demands that Megan sleep with him in exchange for hiring Coop. Coop offers to sell his half of Sterling-Conway when Lexi attempts to prevent him from moving to Philadelphia on business grounds. Peter angrily rejects Michael’s attempt at reconciliation, leading a psychiatrist to suggest that Peter take a vacation. Sam decides to work out her problems with Billy and rejects Jeff’s pleas that he loves her, which Jennifer secretly encouraged. Billy kisses Jennifer on a lunch date. Later, Sam and Jennifer have an argument after Sam and Billy notice Jennifer and Jeff dining together.
191	27	"The Nasty Minded Professor"	Charles Correll	Chip Hayes	March 30, 1998	2397183	10.98
Samantha takes back Jeff after learning that his knee injury has ended his career. Amanda catches Billy and Jennifer making out at the jazz club, and drops hints about Sam's affair. Billy shows up at a little league game where Jeff is coaching, and sees Sam kiss him. He punches Jeff, and Sam is knocked unconscious during the scuffle. She lets Billy take her home from the hospital, but he refuses to talk to her. Taylor tells Kyle that he is the father of her baby. Amanda learns about the pregnancy, and Michael claims that Kyle is the father. Amanda goads Kyle into signing divorce papers, as she plans to get a quickie divorce in the Dominican Republic. Rory asks Amanda to marry him. Megan and Brett get engaged. Dr. Larner attacks Megan, but Brett comes to the rescue. Larner's wife tells Megan that her husband is influential, and that Brett is being asked to choose between the job and Megan. Megan tries to leave Philadelphia, but Brett stops her and says he rejected the job. Lexi becomes fed up with Peter. Peter goes to an isolated cabin to clear his head, but Michael follows him. They are left stranded in the woods. Peter suffers a knee injury, and is forced to let Michael back into the practice when he leads him to safety. The remaining seven episodes of this season were held off until summer. Fox passed them off as part of the seventh season, even though they had been produced for season six.
192	28	"Divorce Dominican Style"	Chip Chalmers	Carol Mendelsohn	July 27, 1998	2397184	7.49
Kyle tries to manipulate Taylor into revealing the truth about her scheme involving Christine. Although Michael warns her to keep quiet, Taylor comes clean after Kyle threatens to break up with her. Kyle insults Taylor and her unborn child, then departs for the Dominican Republic. Amanda and Kyle's divorce is finalized. She marries Rory, as Kyle arrives at the ceremony seconds too late. Taylor tries to commit suicide through carbon monoxide poisoning. Jennifer tells Billy that she has known about Sam's affair with Jeff for months. Jennifer reveals her affair with Billy to Jeff and convinces him to tell Samantha. A furious Sam attacks Jennifer, but Billy comes to Jen's defense. Sam moves out of the apartment. Megan takes a job waitressing at the jazz club after the medical practice lets her go. She learns that Michael cost Brett the Philadelphia job by telling Larner about her past profession. She holds this information over Michael's head to stop him from making trouble at the practice. Peter realizes that he still loves Amanda.
193	29	"A Long Way to Tip-a-Rory"	Charles Pratt, Jr.	Charles Pratt, Jr.	August 3, 1998	2397185	7.62
Rory poisons Amanda after she refuses to give him a share of the agency. Kyle discovers the couple's secret honeymoon location. Rory tries to stab Kyle, but falls on the knife during the scuffle and dies. Amanda recovers from her illness. Lexi learns that her father set her up to take the fall in an embezzlement scheme. She will go to prison unless she can come up with five million dollars. Peter admits his love for Amanda and breaks up with Lexi. He tells Lexi about her father's secret codicil, and suggests that she marry Brett and split the ten million dollars. Brett refuses to consider her offer, and Lexi is arrested. Taylor is saved from the carbon monoxide poisoning, but not before a dream causes her to suspect that Michael is her baby's father. Peter discovers the truth and forces Michael to face his responsibility. Taylor decides that Michael and the baby are her reason for living, and Michael reluctantly allows her to move in with him. Sam and Billy file for divorce. Sam becomes bored with Jeff, while Billy and Jen seem closer than ever.
194	30	"A Match Made in Hell"	Charles Correll	Cynthia J. Cohen	August 10, 1998	2397186	7.81
Overcome with guilt about Lexi's plight, Megan convinces Brett to marry Lexi. She is hurt to learn that they must live together with no one else in the house, especially after Lexi suddenly begins to show a romantic interest in Brett. Michael rebuffs Taylor's attempts to turn him into a responsible father, but softens after delivering a couple's baby on the side of the highway. Peter begins his pursuit of Amanda, who has remarried Kyle. The "newlyweds" cannot find any time together. Billy moves in with Jennifer. A furious Samantha tries to use Jeff to make Billy jealous. She demands that Amanda fire either her or Billy, but learns that the outcome would not be in her favor.
195	31	"Ball N' Jane"	Chip Hayes	James Kahn	August 17, 1998	2397187	8.33
Michael attends a college reunion in Chicago, where he runs into Jane. They seem to instantly renew their connection, but Jane tells him that she is to marry in a few days. Michael later learns that this is not true, and the two reminisce about the good times in their relationship. After a night of passion, Jane follows Michael back to Los Angeles in the hopes of rekindling their romance. Megan and Brett struggle to find time together in the face of Lexi's interference. Peter turns to a shady former patient for assistance after his attempts to woo Amanda prove an unqualified failure. Billy and Samantha vie for an Italian client's in-house advertising position. Jennifer mistakenly believes that Billy plans to leave the country without her. Billy and Jen get engaged—in front of Sam. Samantha launches a plan after overhearing Billy and Amanda discuss Alison's renewed alcohol problem and failed professional life. Josie Bissett reprises her role as Jane Mancini. Initially recurring, she would be promoted in the next season.
196	32	"As Bad as It Gets"	Frank South	Frank South	August 24, 1998	2397188	8.02
Michael has Taylor shipped away in an ambulance, but she and Jane later discover each other. Jane is furious to learn of the pregnancy, and rents an apartment at the complex. Amanda recruits her for a job at AWA. Jane reconciles with Michael, and agrees to help care for Taylor. Taylor decides that she isn't fit to be a mother and asks Jane and Michael to adopt her baby. Peter is uneasy about the plot he arranged with Mr. Beck. He is unable to call it off, and Amanda is kidnapped. Samantha convinces Jeff to send Billy a fax in which "Alison" expresses her love for him. Billy claims that he only wishes to help Alison, but Jennifer fears that he still holds feelings for her. Lexi continues to taunt Megan about her marriage, and goads Brett into sleeping with her.
197	33	"Buona Sera, Mr. Campbell"	Charles Correll	Carol Mendelsohn & Antoinette Stella	August 31, 1998	2397189	8.46
198	34	"Buona Sera, Mr. Campbell"	Charles Correll	Carol Mendelsohn & Antoinette Stella	September 7, 1998	2397190	7.85
Beck's men hold Amanda hostage in a desolate cabin. She escapes, but is quickly recaptured. Kyle is forced to turn to Peter for help when the kidnappers demand a million-dollar ransom. Peter volunteers to leave the money at the drop site after the kidnappers refuse to let Kyle do it himself. Peter arrives at the cabin to find that Amanda is gone. She has escaped again, with one of Beck's men in hot pursuit. Jen is distraught when Billy insists that he will visit Alison in Atlanta. A disgusted Jeff breaks up with Sam. He accepts a job as a sports radio talk show host in Tampa. Sam tells Jennifer that she sent the fax, but Jen keeps the news from Billy to test their relationship. Michael tells Billy the truth, and he breaks up with Jennifer. Lexi orders Brett to stop seeing Megan. She also angers him by purchasing an expensive sailboat. Brett begs Megan to leave the country with him, but she learns that he slept with Lexi. Brett suddenly pretends that he is in love with Lexi, then leaves Megan an ominous message in which he promises to get Lexi out of their lives. He takes Lexi sailing during a terrible rainstorm. Jane and Michael agree to take custody of his and Taylor's son. Taylor goes into labor at the beach house. The kidnapper pursues Amanda through the woods in the midst of the storm. She slips over the edge of a cliff, and is about to be shot when Peter arrives. Peter furtively convinces the kidnapper to let Amanda go, and carries her to the safety of a motel. Kyle is alarmed to find them naked and sharing the same bed, although Peter explains that their clothes were soaked and Amanda was suffering from hypothermia. Kyle later overhears Amanda chatting on the phone with Peter in the middle of the night. Megan stows away on the boat and foils Brett's attempt to kill Lexi. Brett blames Megan for ruining his life by forcing him to marry Lexi. He dumps her and moves to Philadelphia to take the job for Larner. Taylor delivers a healthy baby boy and decides to move back to Boston. Jane and Michael prepare for parenthood, only to find that Taylor has left with Michael Jr. Jane forces Michael to arrange a reconciliation between Billy and a heartbroken Jennifer. The couple moves to Rome together. Sam shows up in Tampa and surprises Jeff with an on-air marriage proposal. Final appearances of Linden Ashby as Brett Cooper, Brooke Langton as Samantha Reilly, Alyssa Milano as Jennifer Mancini, Lisa Rinna as Taylor McBride and Andrew Shue as Billy Campbell. Shue's departure leaves Thomas Calabro as the only original cast member never to have left the series.
