= James A. Swan =

James Albert Swan is an American writer, TV and film producer, and actor. Initially he was a college professor of ecology and psychology at the Universities of Michigan, Western Washington State, Oregon and Washington, but he has evolved into work with entertainment media.

== Career ==
Swan was born in Trenton, Michigan. He graduated with a PhD in environmental psychology at the University of Michigan, and became a professor at the university in 1969, serving in the School of Natural Resources, and the Institute for Social Research for three years. During this time he was part of a group led by William Stapp, seeking a definition of environmental education. Based on this work, Swan published the first article on what is “Environmental Education” in Phi Delta Kappan. In 1985, he produced the “Is The Earth A Living Organism?” symposium for the National Audubon Society. The featured speaker was James Lovelock, creator of the “Living Earth” theory.

Swan is the author and co-author with William Stapp of the first college textbook on environmental education.

In 2004, while working for ESPNOutdoors, he began writing about game wardens. This led him to be invited by California game wardens to produce a documentary called “Endangered Species: CA Fish and Game Wardens" about the shortage of game wardens in California. As a result of the documentary, Swan became a Co-Executive Producer for the show “Wild Justice" on the Nat. Geo. Channel
