= Southern Justice =

- Narrated by: Dave Hoffman
- Country of origin: United States
- Original language: English
- No. of seasons: 3

Production
- Production location: Appalachian Mountains
- Running time: 45 minutes
- Production company: National Geographic

Original release
- Release: 2014 – 2016

Southern Justice is a reality television series that follows the activities and exploits of two southern Sheriff's departments in the Appalachian Mountains of the southern United States. These departments are the Sullivan County Sheriff's Office in Northeast Tennessee and the Ashe County Sheriff's Office in North Carolina. The series was first aired in 2014 under production from the National Geographic Channel and has aired for three seasons. The show was produced by the Weinstein Company and Electus.

== Theme ==
The series follows law enforcement personnel in Ashe County, North Carolina and Sullivan County, Tennessee as police battle various crimes such as drug abuse, car theft, and (overwhelmingly) domestic violence. The series follows relatively the same format as other police reality shows, such as Cops, by featuring three or four investigated crimes, usually half of which are "fast paced" involving a tense arrest or apprehending a fleeing suspect, while the additional segments focus on a longer investigation over several days or weeks.

A similar show Kentucky Justice aired in 2013.
