= Susan Cohen =

Canadian film director, producer and screenwriter

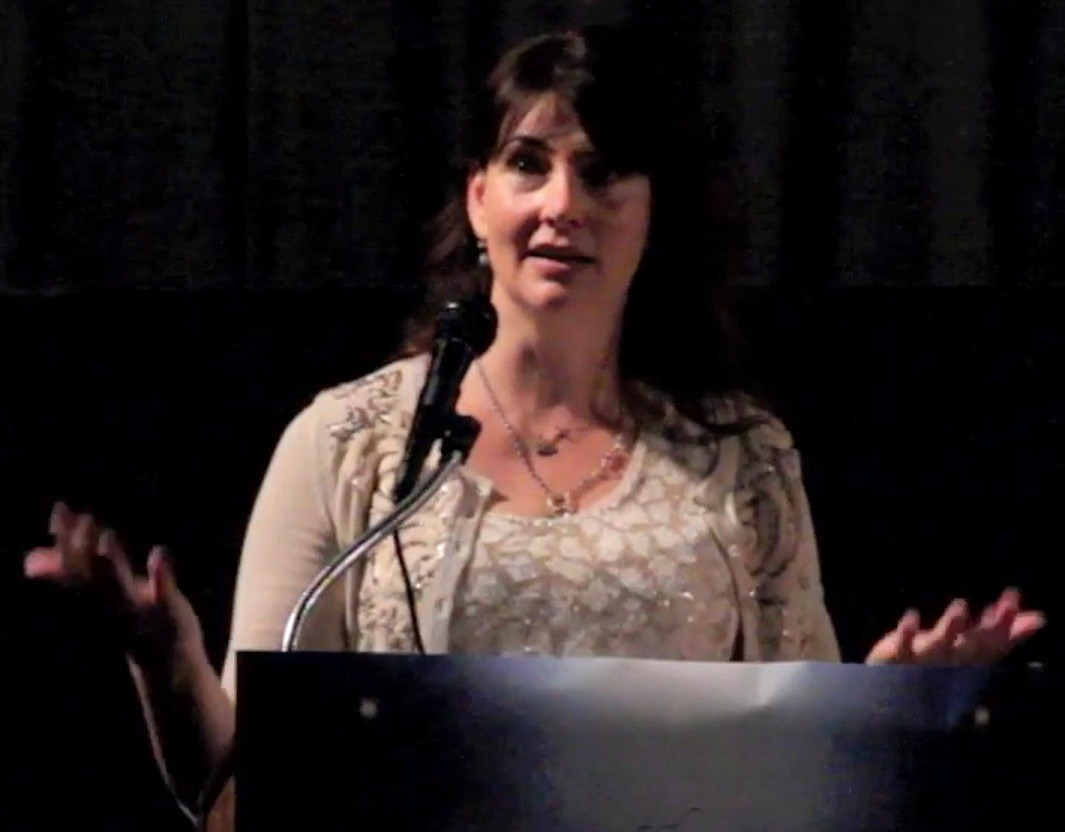
Cohen in 2013

Susan Cohen is a Canadian independent film producer, screenwriter, and film director.

In 2007, Cohen was one of eight women selected to attend the Directing Workshop for Women (DWW) at the American Film Institute. On this occasion, she directed her first short film: Open Your Eyes. She won the Alexis Award for Most Promising Student Filmmaker at the Palm Springs International ShortFest in 2008 and Best Director at both the Canada International Film Festival in 2009 and Beverly Hills Shorts Festival 2009.

She produced the films Fuelling the Fire, Animated American, Fortune Teller (finalist in the Chrysler Million Dollar Film Festival), and the DWW short film Laying Down Arms.

== Open Your Eyes ==
Open Your Eyes was Cohen's first short film as writer and director. It won the 2008 American Film Institute Jean Picker Firstenberg Award for Excellence, Best Short Film at the Anchorage International Film Festival 2008, and Best Drama, Best Film, and Best Actress for Traci Dinwiddie at the Beverly Hills Shorts Festival 2009. "Open Your Eyes" was awarded the Jim DeMulling Speak Out Award and received an honorable mention for Best Narrative at the 42nd Humboldt Film Festival in 2009. It was also nominated for Best Short Film at the Milan Film Festival 2009.
