= Kentucky Justice =

- Narrated by: Jeremy Schwartz
- Country of origin: United States
- Original language: English
- No. of seasons: 1
- No. of episodes: 7

Production
- Executive producer: Matthew Testa
- Production location: Harlan County, Kentucky
- Running time: 45 minutes
- Production company: National Geographic

Original release
- Release: December 15, 2013 – January 24, 2014

Related
- Southern Justice

Kentucky Justice is a reality television series which followed the activities and exploits of the Harlan County Sheriff's department, in eastern Kentucky, from 2013 to 2014. The series was produced by the National Geographic Channel and aired for a single season.

== Theme ==
Harlan County, which is one of the poorest counties in America, was selected for the show due to an epidemic wave of crime, mostly involving drug abuse. The series followed the officers of the Harlan County Sheriff's Department as they attempted to battle rural crime. Unlike other police reality series, such as Cops, the series departed from the classic theme of mixing "fast paced" arrests with slower investigations, and instead focused primarily on following a days or weeks long single investigation, mostly involving the Sheriff personally investigating the case. Shows would also focus on the personal lives of the deputies, in particular young and inexperienced police officers, recently graduated from the police academy, as they learned through mistakes and underwent professional growth.

Some programs would intermix multiple investigations, usually short segments of arrests and pursuing suspects, cut in with a single longer segment regarding a more serious investigation. On one show, cameras captured a chaotic shooting during a drug raid where a suspect inside a house fired twelve rounds at deputies with one deputy returning fire. The suspect was unharmed and the deputy cleared of wrongdoing after an investigation.

== Episodes ==
Episode	Title	Original Air Date
1	Drug Bust Shootout	December 15, 2013
2	Arsonists & Alibis	December 17, 2013
3	The Escape Artist	December 22, 2013
4	Firestarter	December 29, 2013
5	Cocaine Kingpin	January 5, 2014
6	Law Gone Bad	January 24, 2014
7	Arresting the Law	January 24, 2014

== Cancellation ==
Kentucky Justice was cancelled after one season due to the arrest and indictment of Sheriff Marvin J. Lipfird on felony charges of embezzlement of county funds. Lipfird was accused, and later pleaded guilty, to stealing more than ten thousand dollars from a county bank account set up to finance drug related investigations to include the paying of informants as well as providing "buy money" for undercover drug operations. Lipfird's actions were exposed during a state audit and, following his arrest, the series Kentucky Justice was cancelled. The series was then rebooted as Southern Justice.
