= List of Melrose Place episodes =

Melrose Place, a primetime soap opera created by Darren Star, premiered on July 8, 1992 on Fox network in the United States and ended on May 24, 1999. The show spans seven seasons of 226 episodes, and one special aired in 1995. Each episode was approximately 45 minutes long (without commercials) though there were several double or two-part episodes that were shown as feature length 85 to 90 minute episodes

The complete series of Melrose Place has been released on DVD in the United States (Region 1) from 2006 to 2012, the final season having been released on July 31, 2012.

== Series overview ==
Season	Episodes	Originally released	
Season	Episodes	First released	Last released
1	32	July 8, 1992	May 26, 1993
2	32	September 8, 1993	May 18, 1994
3	32	September 12, 1994	May 22, 1995
4	34	September 11, 1995	May 20, 1996
5	34	September 9, 1996	May 19, 1997
6	34	September 8, 1997	September 7, 1998
7	28	September 14, 1998	May 24, 1999

== Episodes ==
=== Season 1 (1992–93) ===
No. overall	No. in season	Title	Directed by	Written by	Original release date	Prod. code	U.S. viewers (millions)
1	1	"Pilot"	Howard Deutch	Darren Star	July 8, 1992	2392001	16.0
2	2	"Friends and Lovers"	Daniel Attias	Charles Pratt, Jr.	July 15, 1992	2392002	19.0
3	3	"Lost and Found"	Charles Braverman	Frederick Rappaport	July 22, 1992	2392003	15.2
4	4	"For Love or Money"	Steven Robman	Amy Spies	July 29, 1992	2392004	11.7
5	5	"Leap of Faith"	Bethany Rooney	Ellen Herman	August 5, 1992	2392005	12.1
6	6	"Second Chances"	Jefferson Kibbee	Toni Graphia	August 12, 1992	2392007	14.6
7	7	"My Way"	Bethany Rooney	Darren Star	August 19, 1992	2392006	13.0
8	8	"Lonely Hearts"	Jefferson Kibbee	Charles Pratt, Jr.	September 2, 1992	2392008	12.3
9	9	"Responsibly Yours"	Daniel Attias	Frederick Rappaport	September 9, 1992	2392009	11.0
10	10	"Burned"	Janet Greek	Robert Guza, Jr.	September 16, 1992	2392010	9.9
11	11	"A Promise Broken"	Nancy Malone	Charles Pratt, Jr.	September 30, 1992	2392011	9.3
12	12	"Polluted Affairs"	Daniel Attias	Amy Spies	October 21, 1992	2392012	11.7
13	13	"Dreams Come True"	John Nicolella	Ellen Herman	October 28, 1992	2392013	10.7
14	14	"Drawing the Line"	David Rosenbloom	Robert Guza, Jr.	November 4, 1992	2392014	12.7
15	15	"House of God"	Nancy Malone	Robert Guza, Jr.	November 11, 1992	2392015	12.9
16	16	"The Whole Truth"	Charles Braverman	Joe Viola	November 18, 1992	2392016	9.9
17	17	"Jake vs Jake"	Victoria Hochberg	Frank South	November 25, 1992	2392017	10.5
18	18	"A Melrose Place Christmas"	Bethany Rooney	Darren Star	December 16, 1992	2392018	10.8
19	19	"Single White Sister"	Charles Correll	Ellen Herman	January 6, 1993	2392019	9.4
20	20	"Peanut Butter and Jealousy"	Nancy Malone	Charles Pratt, Jr.	January 13, 1993	2392020	9.8
21	21	"Picture Imperfect"	Nancy Malone	Story by : Nicole Yorkin & Dawn Prestwich; Teleplay by : Darren Star & Frank South & Charles Pratt Jr.	January 27, 1993	2392021	N/A
22	22	"Three's a Crowd"	Jefferson Kibbee	Amy Spies	February 3, 1993	2392022	10.7
23	23	"My New Partner"	Richard Lang	Frank South	February 10, 1993	2392023	9.9
24	24	"Bye Bye Billy"	Victoria Hochberg	Nicole Yorkin & Dawn Prestwich	February 17, 1993	2392024	13.7
25	25	"Irreconcilable Similarities"	Nancy Malone	Charles Pratt, Jr.	March 3, 1993	2392025	12.0
26	26	"End Game"	James Frawley	Frank South	March 24, 1993	2392026	12.6
27	27	"The Test"	Paul Lazarus	Darren Star	March 31, 1993	2392027	11.4
28	28	"Pushing Boundaries"	Marty Pasetta	Jordan Budde	April 7, 1993	2392028	10.4
29	29	"Pas de Trois"	Chip Chalmers	Charles Pratt, Jr.	April 28, 1993	2392029	11.6
30	30	"Carpe Diem"	Richard Lang	Frank South & Darren Star	May 5, 1993	2392030	14.8
31	31	"State of Need"	Paul Lazarus	Charles Pratt, Jr.	May 12, 1993	2392031	14.0
32	32	"Suspicious Minds"	James Frawley	Darren Star & Frank South	May 26, 1993	2392032	13.2

=== Season 2 (1993–94) ===
No. overall	No. in season	Title	Directed by	Written by	Original release date	Prod. code	U.S. viewers (millions)
33	1	"Much Ado About Everything"	Nancy Malone	Charles Pratt, Jr.	September 8, 1993	2393033	14.7
34	2	"A Long Night's Journey"	Charles Correll	Frank South	September 15, 1993	2393034	12.9
35	3	"Revenge"	James Frawley	Darren Star	September 22, 1993	2393035	16.0
36	4	"Fire Power"	Barbara Amato	Kimberly Costello	September 29, 1993	2393036	11.5
37	5	"Of Bikes and Men"	James Whitmore Jr.	Allison Robbins	October 6, 1993	2393037	12.8
38	6	"Hot and Bothered"	Paul Lazarus	Dee Johnson	October 13, 1993	2393038	13.2
39	7	"Flirting With Disaster"	Bethany Rooney	Charles Pratt, Jr.	October 20, 1993	2393039	11.7
40	8	"No Bed of Roses"	Nancy Malone	Frank South	October 27, 1993	2393040	12.7
41	9	"Married to It"	Marty Pasetta, Jr.	Darren Star	November 3, 1993	2393041	11.8
42	10	"The Tangled Web"	Chip Chalmers	Charles Pratt, Jr.	November 10, 1993	2393042	15.4
43	11	"Collision Course"	Richard Lang	Frank South	November 17, 1993	2393043	16.0
44	12	"Cold Turkey"	Paul Lazarus	Kimberly Costello	November 24, 1993	2393044	12.1
45	13	"Duet for One"	Victoria Hochberg	Allison Robbins	December 1, 1993	2393045	14.1
46	14	"Strange Bedfellows"	Nancy Malone	Dee Johnson	December 15, 1993	2393046	13.1
47	15	"Under the Mistletoe"	Chip Chalmers	Charles Pratt, Jr.	December 22, 1993	2393047	13.9
48	16	"Reunion Blues"	Jefferson Kibbee	Frank South	January 5, 1994	2393048	13.7
49	17	"Michael's Game"	Marty Pasetta, Jr.	Darren Star	January 12, 1994	2393049	15.5
50	18	"Arousing Suspicions"	Steve Dubin	Kimberly Costello	January 26, 1994	2393050	14.3
51	19	"The Young Men and the Sea"	Charles Correll	Allison Robbins	February 2, 1994	2393051	13.2
52	20	"Parting Glances"	Bethany Rooney	Dee Johnson	February 9, 1994	2393052	14.5
53	21	"Swept Away"	Nancy Malone	Charles Pratt, Jr.	February 16, 1994	2393053	15.4
54	22	"With This Ball and Chain"	Jefferson Kibbee	Frank South	February 23, 1994	2393054	12.2
55	23	"Otherwise Engaged"	Chip Chalmers	Darren Star	March 2, 1994	2393055	17.1
56	24	"Love, Mancini Style"	Charles Correll	Allison Robbins	March 16, 1994	2393056	16.8
57	25	"The Two Mrs. Mancinis"	Marty Pasetta, Jr.	Allison Robbins	March 23, 1994	2393057	15.2
58	26	"In Bed With the Enemy"	Parker Stevenson	Stevie Stern	April 6, 1994	2393058	15.4
59	27	"Psycho Therapy"	Charles Correll	Kimberly Costello	April 20, 1994	2393059	15.9
60	28	"The Bitch Is Back"	Nancy Malone	Frank South	April 27, 1994	2393060	17.5
61	29	"Imperfect Strangers"	Chip Chalmers	Dee Johnson	May 4, 1994	2393061	16.2
62	30	"Devil With the G-String On"	Paul Lazarus	Charles Pratt, Jr.	May 11, 1994	2393062	17.8
63	31	"Till Death Do Us Part"	Chip Chalmers	Darren Star & Frank South	May 18, 1994	2393063A	19.3
64	32	"Till Death Do Us Part"	Chip Chalmers	Darren Star & Frank South	May 18, 1994	2393063B	19.3

=== Season 3 (1994–95) ===
No. overall	No. in season	Title	Directed by	Written by	Original release date	Prod. code	U.S. viewers (millions)
65	1	"I Am Curious, Melrose"	Charles Correll	Charles Pratt Jr.	September 12, 1994	2394064	16.0
66	2	"It's a Bad World After All"	Jeff Melman	Frank South	September 19, 1994	2394065	12.7
67	3	"In-Laws and Outlaws"	Paul Lazarus	Darren Star	September 26, 1994	2394066	13.1
68	4	"Grand Delusions"	Victoria Hochberg	Kimberly Costello	October 3, 1994	2394067	12.5
SPE1	SP1	"A Day in the Lives of Melrose Place"	Unknown	Unknown	October 5, 1994	TBA	10.5
69	5	"Nonsexual Healing"	Charles Correll	Allison Robbins	October 10, 1994	2394068	13.7
70	6	"No Strings Attached"	Paul Lazarus	Dee Johnson	October 17, 1994	2394069	13.2
71	7	"The Crook, the Creep, His Lover and Her Sister"	Scott Paulin	Carol Mendelsohn	October 24, 1994	2394070	13.2
72	8	"Love Reeks"	Richard Lang	Frank South	October 31, 1994	2394071	13.3
73	9	"Dr. Jekyll Saves His Hide"	Charles Correll	Chip Hayes	November 7, 1994	2394072	12.2
74	10	"And Justice for None"	Chip Chalmers	Kimberly Costello	November 14, 1994	2394073	13.6
75	11	"The Days of Wine and Vodka"	Marty Pasetta	Allison Robbins	November 21, 1994	2394074	12.2
76	12	"The Doctor That Rocks the Cradle"	Richard Lang	Dee Johnson	November 28, 1994	2394075	14.0
77	13	"Just Say No"	Victoria Hochberg	Carol Mendelsohn	December 5, 1994	2394076	14.1
78	14	"Sex, Drugs and Rockin' the Cradle"	Parker Stevenson	Frank South	December 12, 1994	2394077	13.2
79	15	"Holiday on Ice"	Charles Corell	Kimberly Costello	December 19, 1994	2394078	14.9
80	16	"Bye Bye Baby"	Jefferson Kibbee	Allison Robins	January 2, 1995	2394079	14.2
SPE2	SP2	"Love Thy Neighbor: The Baddest and the Best of Melrose Place"	Paul Wales	Bill Brown	January 9, 1995	TBA	10.4
81	17	"They Shoot Mothers, Don't They?"	Charles Correll	Dee Johnson & Carol Mendelsohn	January 16, 1995	2394080A	19.2
82	18	"They Shoot Mothers, Don't They?"	Charles Correll	Dee Johnson & Carol Mendelsohn	January 16, 1995	2394080B	19.2
83	19	"Another Perfect Day in Hell"	Chip Chalmers	Frank South	January 23, 1995	2394081	16.0
84	20	"Boxing Sydney"	Richard Lang	Stevie Stern	February 6, 1995	2394082	14.0
85	21	"St. Valentine's Day Massacre"	Chip Chalmers	Kimberly Costello	February 13, 1995	2394083	16.6
86	22	"Breakfast at Tiffany's, Dinner at Eight"	Victoria Hochberg	Allison Robbins	February 20, 1995	2394084	15.2
87	23	"And the Winner Is…"	Richard Lang	Dee Johnson	February 27, 1995	2394085	14.3
88	24	"Love and Death 101"	Jeff Kibbee	Frank South	March 13, 1995	2394086	13.9
89	25	"To Live and Die in Malibu"	Chip Chalmers	Carol Mendelsohn	March 20, 1995	2394087	13.9
90	26	"All About Brooke"	Victoria Hochberg	Dee Johnson	April 3, 1995	2394088	12.0
91	27	"Melrose Impossible"	Frank South	Frank South	April 10, 1995	2394089	11.6
92	28	"Hose by Any Other Name"	Charles Correll	Allison Robbins	May 1, 1995	2394090	10.9
93	29	"Kiss Kiss Bang Bang"	Richard Lang	Dee Johnson	May 8, 1995	2394091	12.2
94	30	"Framing of the Shrews"	Chip Chalmers	Kimberly Costello	May 15, 1995	23942092	11.2
95	31	"The Big Bang"	Charles Correll	Carol Mendelsohn & Allison Robbins & Dee Johnson	May 22, 1995	2394093A	15.6
96	32	"The Big Bang"	Charles Correll	Carol Mendelsohn & Allison Robbins & Dee Johnson	May 22, 1995	2394093B	15.6

=== Season 4 (1995–96) ===
No. overall	No. in season	Title	Directed by	Written by	Original release date	Prod. code	U.S. viewers (millions)
97	1	"Postmortem Madness"	Charles Correll	Frank South	September 11, 1995	2395094	16.0
98	2	"Melrose Is Like a Box of Chocolates"	Charles Correll	Carol Mendelsohn	September 18, 1995	2395095	12.4
99	3	"Blind Ambition"	Victoria Hochberg	Dee Johnson	September 20, 1995	2395096	14.7
100	4	"Simply Shocking"	Richard Lang	Charles Pratt, Jr.	September 25, 1995	2395097	13.8
101	5	"Drawing Henry"	Charles Correll	Allison Robbins	October 2, 1995	2395098	14.0
102	6	"The Jane Mutiny"	Scott Paulin	Kimberly Costello	October 9, 1995	2395099	13.4
103	7	"Let The Games Begin"	Chip Chalmers	Stevie Stern	October 16, 1995	2395100	13.3
104	8	"Dial M For Melrose"	Richard Lang	Chip Hayes	October 23, 1995	2395101	13.4
105	9	"Amanda Unplugged"	Charles Correll	James Kahn	October 30, 1995	2395102	14.2
106	10	"El Syd"	Chip Chalmers	Charles Pratt, Jr.	November 6, 1995	2395103	14.5
107	11	"Free Kimmy"	Charles Correll	Carol Mendelsohn	November 13, 1995	2395104	13.4
108	12	"Kimberly Does L.A."	Thomas Calabro	Dee Johnson	November 20, 1995	2395105	13.4
109	13	"Hook, Line and Hayley"	Charles Correll	Frank South	November 27, 1995	2395106	12.9
110	14	"Two Flew Over the Cuckoo's Nest"	Janet Greek	Allison Robbins	December 4, 1995	2395107	14.3
111	15	"Oy! To the World"	Chip Chalmers	Kimberly Costello	December 11, 1995	2395108	12.9
112	16	"Holy Strokes"	James Darren	Charles Pratt, Jr.	January 1, 1996	2395109	12.4
113	17	"The Brooke Stops Here"	Charles Correll	James Kahn	January 8, 1996	2395110	14.3
114	18	"Sydney, Bothered and Bewildered"	Chip Chalmers	Stevie Stern	January 15, 1996	2395111	13.6
115	19	"The Bobby Trap"	Frank South	Frank South	January 22, 1996	2395112	13.7
116	20	"No Lifeguard on Duty"	Richard Lang	Dee Johnson & Carol Mendelsohn	February 5, 1996	2395113A	16.5
117	21	"No Lifeguard on Duty"	Richard Lang	Dee Johnson & Carol Mendelsohn	February 5, 1996	2395113B	16.5
118	22	"Devil in a Wet Dress"	Chip Hayes	Kimberly Costello	February 12, 1996	2395114	14.9
119	23	"The Circle of Strife"	Janet Greek	Allison Robbins	February 19, 1996	2395115	13.8
120	24	"Run, Billy, Run"	Charles Correll	Charles Pratt, Jr.	February 26, 1996	2395116	14.0
121	25	"Ruthless People"	Richard Lang	Dee Johnson	March 4, 1996	2395117	13.3
122	26	"The Burning Couch"	Anson Williams	Kimberly Costello	March 11, 1996	2395118	13.0
123	27	"Triumph of the Bill"	Janet Greek	James Kahn	March 18, 1996	2395119	12.9
124	28	"What Comes Up, Must Come Down"	Richard Lang	Allison Robbins	April 1, 1996	2395120	13.3
125	29	"True Fibs"	Victoria Hochberg	Chip Hayes	April 15, 1996	2395121	11.9
126	30	"Melrose Unglued"	Charles Pratt, Jr.	Charles Pratt, Jr.	April 29, 1996	2395122	12.2
127	31	"Peter's Excellent Adventure"	Chip Chalmers	James Kahn	May 6, 1996	2395123	12.3
128	32	"Full Metal Betsy"	Frank South	Frank South	May 15, 1996	2395124	12.3
129	33	"Dead Sisters Walking"	Charles Correll	Carol Mendelsohn & Dee Johnson	May 20, 1996	2395125A	11.0
130	34	"Dead Sisters Walking"	Charles Correll	Carol Mendelsohn & Dee Johnson	May 20, 1996	2395125B	11.0

=== Season 5 (1996–97) ===
No. overall	No. in season	Title	Directed by	Written by	Original release date	Prod. code	U.S. viewers (millions)
131	1	"Living With Disaster"	Frank South	Frank South	September 9, 1996	2396126	11.9
132	2	"Over Dick's Dead Body"	Chip Chalmers	Charles Pratt, Jr.	September 16, 1996	2396127	10.8
133	3	"Moving Violations"	Richard Lang	Carol Mendelsohn	September 23, 1996	2396128	11.0
134	4	"Hunka Hunka Burnin' Love"	Charles Correll	Dee Johnson	September 30, 1996	2396129	11.0
135	5	"Un-Janed Melody"	Jefferson Kibbee	James Kahn	October 28, 1996	2396130	12.0
136	6	"Jane's Addiction"	Chip Chalmers	Kathryn Baker	November 4, 1996	2396131	12.5
137	7	"Young Doctors in Heat"	Anson Williams	Edward Gold	November 11, 1996	2396132	13.0
138	8	"Mission: Interpersonal"	Charles Correll	Charles Pratt, Jr.	November 11, 1996	2396133	13.0
139	9	"Farewell, Mike's Concubine"	Jefferson Kibbee	Carol Mendelsohn	November 18, 1996	2396134	13.1
140	10	"Nice Work If You Can Get It"	Charles Correll	Dee Johnson	November 25, 1996	2396135	12.4
141	11	"Sole Sister"	Chip Hayes	Chip Hayes	December 2, 1996	2396136	12.5
142	12	"Quest for Mother"	Charles Correll	James Kahn	December 9, 1996	2396137	12.1
143	13	"Crazy Love"	Chip Chalmers	Kathryn Baker	December 16, 1996	2396138	12.0
144	14	"The Accidental Doctor"	Charles Correll	Edward Gold	January 6, 1997	2396139	12.30
145	15	"Escape From L.A."	Richard Lang	Frank South	January 13, 1997	2396140	11.46
146	16	"The Eyes of the Storm"	Harvey Frost	Cynthia J. Cohen	January 20, 1997	2396141	12.24
147	17	"Better Homes and Condos"	Janet Greek	James Kahn	January 27, 1997	2396142	12.09
148	18	"Great Sexpectations"	Richard Lang	Carol Mendelsohn & Dee Johnson	February 3, 1997	2396143A	11.28
149	19	"Great Sexpectations"	Richard Lang	Carol Mendelsohn & Dee Johnson	February 3, 1997	2396143B	11.28
150	20	"Catch Her in the Lie"	Charles Pratt, Jr.	Charles Pratt, Jr.	February 10, 1997	2396144	11.85
151	21	"Men Are From Melrose"	Chip Hayes	Frank South	February 17, 1997	2396145	12.91
152	22	"Frames 'R' Us"	Robert J. Metoyer	James Kahn	February 24, 1997	2396146	12.30
153	23	"Screams From a Marriage"	Charles Correll	Edward Gold	March 3, 1997	2396147	11.89
154	24	"101 Damnations"	Richard Lang	Carol Mendelsohn	March 10, 1997	2396148	12.12
155	25	"From Here to Maternity"	Thomas Calabro	Dee Johnson	March 17, 1997	2396149	11.72
156	26	"Last Exit to Ohio"	Jefferson Kibbee	Frank South	March 31, 1997	2396150	11.50
157	27	"The Dead Wives Club"	Chip Chalmers	Charles Pratt, Jr.	April 7, 1997	2396151	10.00
158	28	"Deja Vu, All Over Again"	James Darren	Neil Landau	April 14, 1997	2396152	11.57
159	29	"All Beths Are Off"	Charles Correll	Chip Hayes	April 21, 1997	2396153	10.86
160	30	"Ultimatums and the Single Guy"	Anson Williams	Dee Johnson	April 28, 1997	2396154	11.77
161	31	"Going Places"	Charles Pratt, Jr.	Carol Mendelsohn	May 5, 1997	2396155	10.54
162	32	"Secrets and Lies and More Lies"	Frank South	Frank South	May 12, 1997	2396156	10.22
163	33	"Who's Afraid of Amanda Woodward?"	Charles Correll	Charles Pratt, Jr.	May 19, 1997	2396157A	11.83
164	34	"Who's Afraid of Amanda Woodward?"	Charles Correll	Charles Pratt, Jr.	May 19, 1997	2396157B	11.83

=== Season 6 (1997–98) ===
No. overall	No. in season	Title	Directed by	Written by	Original release date	Prod. code	U.S. viewers (millions)
165	1	"A Brand New Day"	Frank South	Frank South	September 8, 1997	2397158	10.69
166	2	"The Trojan Stork"	Charles Correll	Charles Pratt, Jr.	September 15, 1997	2397159	10.27
167	3	"No Time for Sperm Banks"	Jefferson Kibbee	Carol Mendelsohn	September 22, 1997	2397160	10.16
168	4	"The Doctor Is In...Deep"	Anson Williams	James Kahn	September 29, 1997	2397161	10.62
169	5	"Desperately Seeking Samantha"	Chip Chalmers	Neil Landau	October 20, 1997	2397162	9.99
170	6	"The Light At the End of the Tumble"	Charles Correll	Cynthia J. Cohen	October 27, 1997	2397163	10.28
171	7	"Secrets and Wives"	Jefferson Kibbee	Antoinette Stella	November 3, 1997	2397164	9.88
172	8	"A Shot in the Dark"	Anson Williams	Frank South	November 10, 1997	2397165	10.55
173	9	"Attack of the Scalpel Woman"	Chip Chalmers	Charles Pratt, Jr.	November 17, 1997	2397166	10.24
174	10	"My Little Coma Girl"	Charles Correll	Carol Mendelsohn	November 24, 1997	2397167	10.70
175	11	"Everybody Comes to Kyle's"	Jefferson Kibbee	James Kahn	December 1, 1997	2397168	9.75
176	12	"A Bump in the Night"	Charles Correll	Cynthia J. Cohen	December 15, 1997	2397169	8.76
177	13	"A Tree Talks in Melrose"	Thomas Calabro	Antoinette Stella	December 22, 1997	2397170	8.25
178	14	"To Kill a Whirlybird"	Charles Correll	Frank South	January 5, 1998	2397171	10.31
179	15	"Amanda's Back"	Charles Correll	James Kahn	January 12, 1998	2397172	10.77
180	16	"Kyle of the Desert"	Charles Pratt, Jr.	Charles Pratt, Jr.	January 19, 1998	2397173	10.38
181	17	"Coop de Grace"	Chip Hayes	Chip Hayes	January 26, 1998	2397174	10.14
182	18	"Mama Mia"	Thomas Calabro	Carol Mendelsohn	February 2, 1998	2397175	9.90
183	19	"Last Train to Baghdad"	Anson Williams	James Kahn & Frank South	February 9, 1998	2397176A	10.39
184	20	"Last Train to Baghdad"	Anson Williams	James Kahn & Frank South	February 9, 1998	2397176B	10.39
185	21	"A Swing and a Mrs."	Jefferson Kibbee	Antoinette Stella & Cynthia J. Cohen	February 16, 1998	2397177	9.77
186	22	"Blunt Drama"	Harvey Frost	Charles Pratt, Jr.	February 23, 1998	2397178	10.17
187	23	"A Christine Runs Through It"	Charles Correll	Carol Mendelsohn	March 2, 1998	2397179	10.43
188	24	"Too Romantic For Words"	Chip Chalmers	Frank South	March 9, 1998	2397180	10.75
189	25	"Four Affairs and a Pregnancy"	Jefferson Kibbee	James Kahn	March 16, 1998	2397181	10.15
190	26	"M.P. Confidential"	Robert J. Metoyer	Charles Pratt, Jr.	March 30, 1998	2397182	10.98
191	27	"The Nasty Minded Professor"	Charles Correll	Chip Hayes	March 30, 1998	2397183	10.98
192	28	"Divorce Dominican Style"	Chip Chalmers	Carol Mendelsohn	July 27, 1998	2397184	7.49
193	29	"A Long Way to Tip-a-Rory"	Charles Pratt, Jr.	Charles Pratt, Jr.	August 3, 1998	2397185	7.62
194	30	"A Match Made in Hell"	Charles Correll	Cynthia J. Cohen	August 10, 1998	2397186	7.81
195	31	"Ball N' Jane"	Chip Hayes	James Kahn	August 17, 1998	2397187	8.33
196	32	"As Bad as It Gets"	Frank South	Frank South	August 24, 1998	2397188	8.02
197	33	"Buona Sera, Mr. Campbell"	Charles Correll	Carol Mendelsohn & Antoinette Stella	August 31, 1998	2397189	8.46
198	34	"Buona Sera, Mr. Campbell"	Charles Correll	Carol Mendelsohn & Antoinette Stella	September 7, 1998	2397190	7.85

=== Season 7 (1998–99) ===
No. overall	No. in season	Title	Directed by	Written by	Original release date	Prod. code	U.S. viewers (millions)
199	1	"The World According to Matt"	Charles Correll	Frank South	September 14, 1998	2398191	9.41
200	2	"Where the Hookers Grow"	Jefferson Kibbee	Charles Pratt, Jr.	September 21, 1998	2398192	9.02
201	3	"Dr. Jealousy"	Charles Correll	Carol Mendelsohn	September 28, 1998	2398193	8.11
202	4	"Not Quite All About Eve"	Jack Wagner	James Kahn	October 19, 1998	2398194	8.90
203	5	"The Rumor Whisperer"	Jefferson Kibbee	Charles Pratt, Jr.	October 26, 1998	2398195	8.58
204	6	"The Night the Lights Went Out at Melrose"	Charles Correll	Carol Mendelsohn	November 2, 1998	2398196	8.35
205	7	"Suspicion"	Chip Chalmers	James Kahn	November 9, 1998	2398197	9.10
206	8	"Fiddling on the Roof"	Anson Williams	Antoinette Stella	November 16, 1998	2398198	8.73
207	9	"Lethal Wedding 4"	Richard Denault	Charles Pratt, Jr. & Carol Mendelsohn	November 23, 1998	2398199	8.80
208	10	"When Cheerleaders Attack"	Chip Chalmers	Jule Selbo	November 30, 1998	2398200	9.03
209	11	"Suddenly Sperm"	Gabrielle Beaumont	Cynthia J. Cohen	December 14, 1998	2398201	8.20
210	12	"The Usual Santas"	Charles Pratt, Jr.	Charles Pratt, Jr.	December 21, 1998	2398202	8.26
211	13	"The Kyle High Club"	Jefferson Kibbee	James Kahn	January 11, 1999	2398203	8.55
212	14	"I Married a Jock Murderer"	Tracy Lynch Britton	Carol Mendelsohn	January 18, 1999	2398204	9.31
213	15	"A Fist Full of Secrets"	Robert J. Metoyer	Kris Dobkin	January 25, 1999	2398205	8.15
214	16	"The Younger Son Also Rises"	Joel J. Feigenbaum	Antoinette Stella	February 8, 1999	2398206	8.42
215	17	"Saving Ryan's Privates"	Rob Estes	Charles Pratt, Jr.	February 15, 1999	2398207	8.20
216	18	"They Shoot Blanks, Don't They?"	Charles Correll	James Kahn	February 22, 1999	2398208	9.23
217	19	"How Amanda Got Her Groove Back"	Anson Williams	Carol Mendelsohn & Cynthia J. Cohen	March 1, 1999	2398209	9.05
218	20	"Unpleasantville"	Jefferson Kibbee	Jule Selbo	March 8, 1999	2398210	9.03
219	21	"Ryan's Choice"	Charles Correll	James Kahn	April 5, 1999	2398211	7.90
220	22	"McBride's Head Revisited"	Chip Chalmers	Charles Pratt, Jr.	April 12, 1999	2398212	6.88
221	23	"The Daughterboy"	Anson Williams	Cynthia J. Cohen & Carol Mendelsohn	April 19, 1999	2398213	8.40
222	24	"Bitter Homes and Guardians"	Jefferson Kibbee	Peter Dunne	April 26, 1999	2398214	7.51
223	25	"Floral Knowledge"	Charles Correll	Jule Selbo & Antoinette Stella	May 3, 1999	2398215	8.30
224	26	"Lexi Gets Stiffed"	Robert J. Metoyer	Carol Mendelsohn & Cynthia J. Cohen	May 10, 1999	2398216	7.84
225	27	"Dead Men Don't Shut Up"	J. Benjamin Chulay	James Kahn	May 17, 1999	2398217	7.82
226	28	"Asses to Ashes"	Charles Pratt, Jr.	Charles Pratt, Jr.	May 24, 1999	2398218	10.36
