= Leslie and the Badgers =

American folk-country band

Leslie Stevens and the Badgers
- Origin: Los Angeles, California
- Genres: Alternative country, Americana
- Years active: 2006–present
- Label: Thirty Tigers
- Members: Leslie Stevens (vocals/guitar); Ben Reddell (bass guitar); Travis Popichak (drums); Charlene Huang (violin); Eugene Fillios (lap steel/guitar)
- Past members: Glenn Oyabe (guitar)
- Website: Official website

Leslie and the Badgers or Leslie Stevens or Leslie Stevens and The Badgers is an American folk-country band formed in 2006 by songwriter and vocalist Leslie Stevens, who is currently releasing records as a solo artist under her name, Leslie Stevens.

The Badgers released their first album, Leslie and the Badgers, in 2007 (currently out of print). Five songs from the album became the 2008 EP Greetings from.... The band's 2009 release, Roomful of Smoke, was produced by David Bianco (Bob Dylan, Tom Petty, Tift Merritt). The Los Angeles Times said Stevens' voice and writing evokes Patsy Clinewhile No Depression wrote that she calls to mind Emmylou Harris. Randall Roberts, of The LA Times, called the album "a little known gem."

Leslie Stevens was named as Los Angeles' best country singer by the LA Weekly in 2019. She has worked as a session singer contributing backing vocals and playing various instruments on records by such artists as Brian Wilson, Father John Misty, Florence and The Machine, and Jim James of My Morning Jacket. Kenneth Pattengale of the Milk Carton Kids produced, played, and sang on her 2016 solo release "The Donkey and Rose".

Her 2019 release "Sinner" was produced by Jonathan Wilson (Billy Strings, Erin Rae, Dawes). The Guardian said the album "packs an emotional punch," and established her as a "songwriter of skill and passion."

Her band has toured extensively on the West Coast and was invited to showcase at SXSW in 2010 and to perform on National Public Radio's Mountain Stage show. They have toured with M. Ward, Tyler Ramsey(Band of Horses) Rhett Miller and Laura Veirs among others, and opened for Loudon Wainwright III. The band has appeared at Noise Pop, The Eagle Rock Music Festival and Topanga Days. Their first national tour in May 2010 took them east for the first time to Chicago and New York City.

The band made its first TV appearance in April 2008 playing their original "Old Timers" on the FX series, The Riches, starring Minnie Driver.

Jon Hamm is a fan and has mentioned Leslie in Interviews about Los Angeles. Jon stars with Leslie in her 2024 music video for the song Blue Roses.

== Discography ==
- Leslie and the Badgers (2007) (out of print)
- Greetings from.....(EP) (2008) LyricLand
- Roomful of Smoke (2010) LyricLand Thirty Tigers
- Los Angeles (7" vinyl) (2010) Trailer Fire Records
- LESLIE STEVENS
- The Donkey and The Rose (2016) Leslie Stevens Solo
- Sinner (2019) Leslie Stevens, Solo Thirty Tigers
