= List of Annoying Orange episodes =

Annoying Orange is an American animated comedy series created by former Minnesota film student and MTV production assistant Dane Boedigheimer on October 9, 2009. It stars its creator as an anthropomorphic orange who annoys other fruits, vegetables, and various other food and objects by using jokes and puns which are sometimes crude.

== Series overview ==
Season	Episodes	Originally released	
Season	Episodes	First released	Last released
1	4	October 9, 2009	December 23, 2009
2	54	January 15, 2010	December 24, 2010
3	57	January 7, 2011	December 23, 2011
4	57	January 6, 2012	December 28, 2012
5	77	January 18, 2013	December 30, 2013
6	54	January 3, 2014	December 26, 2014
7	61	January 2, 2015	December 25, 2015
8	53	January 1, 2016	December 30, 2016
9	53	January 6, 2017	December 29, 2017
10	55	January 5, 2018	December 28, 2018
11	60	January 5, 2019	December 27, 2019
12	61	January 3, 2020	December 25, 2020
13	53	January 1, 2021	December 31, 2021
14	51	January 7, 2022	December 30, 2022
15	39	January 6, 2023	December 25, 2023
16	30	January 5, 2024	December 20, 2024
17	24	January 10, 2025	December 26, 2025
18	TBA	January 2, 2026	present

== Episodes ==
=== Season 1 (2009) ===
No. overall	No. in season	Title	Time	Original release date	Online viewers (million)
1	1	"Pilot"	1:33	October 9, 2009	232.0
Orange annoys an apple. Note: This episode was uploaded to the Daneboe channel on October 9, 2009, before being reuploaded on Annoying Orange on February 15, 2010. This was also intended to be a standalone video, but more episodes began production because of the rising popularity of the video.
2	2	"Plumpkin"	2:11	October 29, 2009	47.83
Orange annoys a pumpkin who he thinks is another orange. Note: This episode was originally uploaded on Daneboe as a Halloween special on October 29, 2009, before being reuploaded on Annoying Orange on February 15, 2010. This is the debut appearance of Pumpkin.
3	3	"Toe-May-Toe"	2:12	December 4, 2009	48.32
Orange annoys a tomato who he thinks is an apple. Note: This episode was originally uploaded on Daneboe on December 4, 2009, before being reuploaded on Annoying Orange on February 15, 2010.
4	4	"Sandy Claus"	2:08	December 23, 2009	23.64
Orange annoys a Santa Claus doll which later flies away like sand. Note: This episode was originally uploaded as a Christmas special on December 23, 2009, before being reuploaded on February 15, 2010.

=== Season 2 (2010) ===
No. overall	No. in season	Title	Time	Original release date	Online viewers (millions)
5	1	"More Annoying Orange"	2:33	January 15, 2010	31.66
Orange gets his first feeling of annoyance when he meets another orange who's more annoying than him. Note: This episode was uploaded on Daneboe and Annoying Orange on February 15, 2010.
6	2	"Hey YOUTUBE!!!"	1:34	January 15, 2010	9.113
Orange introduces his new YouTube channel. Note: This "episode" was age-restricted until 2022 for unknown reasons, and is the first video uploaded on the Annoying Orange YouTube channel.
7	3	"Wazzup!"	1:13	January 22, 2010	57.10
Orange, two bananas, a lemon, a kiwi, and an apple recreate an old Budweiser commercial. Note: This is the first true episode on the official "Annoying Orange" YouTube channel.
8	4	"Super Bowl Football"	2:37	January 29, 2010	30.37
Orange annoys a football and a soccerball. Notes: This is the last episode as a Super Bowl Sunday special on Daneboe's YouTube channel, before the series moved to its own main channel. It was reuploaded to said channel on February 15, 2010.
9	5	"Annoying Saw"	2:42	February 5, 2010	66.80
Orange and an eggplant are kidnapped by Jigsaw in a parody of the film Saw.
10	6	"Passion of the Fruit"	3:14	February 19, 2010	26.70
Orange falls in love with a Passion Fruit until a Grapefruit begins ruining their romanctic moment. Notes: This episode is a Valentine’s Day special. In addition, the title is a reference to Passion of the Christ. Pear becomes a permanent cast member in this episode.
11	7	"Orange Gets Autotuned"	2:35	February 26, 2010	25.53
Orange meets an iPhone, whom he finds boring, until he discovers that the iPhone can autotune him.
12	8	"A Cheesy Episode"	2:12	March 5, 2010	39.68
Orange annoys a wedge of Mozzarella cheese so much it begins to have suicidal thoughts. Note: This is the first appearance of Toby Turner in the Annoying Orange series; he went on to make several more guest appearances before he became part of the television show cast.
13	9	"Luck o' the Irish"	2:55	March 12, 2010	19.17
Orange finds a pot of gold that belongs to a leprechaun named Liam, but refuses to return it to him. When Liam grants Orange three wishes to get his gold, he gets a whistling pinwheel as his first wish, which irritates him. Notes: This episode is a Saint Patrick’s Day special.
14	10	"Prank Call #1: Tanning Salon"	2:10	March 19, 2010	19.15
Orange makes a prank call to a clerk named Shelly at a tanning salon. This was an actual prank call made by Boedigheimer on March 2, 2010.
15	11	"Annoying Super Mario"	2:23	March 26, 2010	59.61
Mario takes on Orange in Bowser's dungeon while trying to rescue Princess Peach.
16	12	"Muddy Buddy"	2:27	April 2, 2010	18.69
Orange meets a potato named MysteryPotatoMan, mistakes him for Pear's brother, and annoys him by blowing an air horn.
17	13	"Excess Cabbage"	3:01	April 9, 2010	23.94
Orange tries to annoy a stalk of celery, but he gets upset thinking that if he annoys him, he'll get chopped up and never see him again. So his friend Cabbage (guest star Shay Carl) tries to get it back by annoying an onion too. In the end, the favor's returned when Orange annoys him.
18	14	"The Annoying Trailer"	1:17	April 16, 2010	5.261
A trailer for new episodes is shown.
19	15	"The Cursed Onion Ring Tape"	1:09	April 23, 2010	5.113
Viewers are shown the cursed video tape from "The Onion Ring", a parody of the Japanese film Ring and its American remake The Ring, featured in the subsequent episode. Note: Canadian actor Sergio Di Zio is the voice of an Orange on the Orange Tree seen in the video.
20	16	"The Onion Ring"	4:18	April 23, 2010	21.72
Four friends (portrayed by Kevin Brueck, Bobjenz, Theresa Barket, and Dan Heinan) watch the cursed Onion Ring video tape of the previous episode and get a phone call from Orange, causing them to become onion rings seven days later.
21	17	"Wasssabi"	1:35	April 30, 2010	40.81
Orange performs another Budweiser commercial parody, with Pear, a lemon, two pieces of sushi, and a dollop of Wasabi.
22	18	"Pain-apple"	2:06	May 7, 2010	35.61
Orange meets a pineapple, and annoys him as usual.
23	19	"Pacmania"	2:27	May 14, 2010	72.15
Orange and Pac-Man trade places to celebrate the 30th anniversary of the release of Pac-Man; Orange fights Blinky, Pinky, Inky, and Clyde while Pac-Man annoys Pear in the kitchen.
24	20	"Picture Contest"	1:45	May 21, 2010	13.42
Due to there being no new episode, Orange holds a picture contest, where fans have to create pictures featuring Orange and friends and post them on his Facebook page.
25	21	"Grapefruit's Revenge"	3:19	May 28, 2010	18.01
Orange, Pear, and Passion meet Grapefruit's sister, who believes that Orange killed her brother as she heard it through gossip, when it was really Knife who had killed him. Note: Passion Fruit becomes a permanent cast member in this episode.
26	22	"Grandpa Lemon"	3:09	June 4, 2010	20.81
Orange meets an elderly lemon, but he's hard to annoy because he keeps falling asleep. Note: Grandpa Lemon makes his debut appearance.
27	23	"Picture Contest Winners!"	2:00	June 11, 2010	6.800
The winning pictures from the previous picture contest are shown.
28	24	"Back to the Fruiture"	3:03	June 11, 2010	21.87
Orange is visited by a future version of himself, who asks him to help save the world from an evil space warlord Orange with his whistling pinwheel. However, Pear has taken the pinwheel and refuses to give it back. The "warlord" arrives and destroys "Future Orange", as he reveals to be the real Future Orange and that the first Orange was evil.
29	25	"Mystery Guest"	1:18	June 18, 2010	10.03
An announcement's made that a guest star, yet to be revealed, will make an appearance in the next episode.
30	26	"Annoying Orange vs. FRED!!!"	4:02	June 25, 2010	55.87
Liam the Leprechaun returns to get revenge on Orange by entering him in Pesterfest 2010 against Fred Figglehorn to see who is more annoying.
31	27	"Orange of July"	2:39	July 2, 2010	13.37
On Independence Day, Orange annoys a watermelon and a display's final firework at a park.
32	28	"The Orange Cup"	1:11	July 8, 2010	8.531
Soccer Ball returns, and Orange annoys him with a vuvuzela.
33	29	"Teenage Mutant Ninja Apples"	3:22	July 16, 2010	18.31
Orange meets a green apple and is convinced he is a mutant because he is not red, though the apple tries proving him wrong by pointing out various different-colored apples. He also discovers how to beatbox to further annoy others.
34	30	"Lady Pasta"	3:01	July 23, 2010	52.60
Orange meets the spaghetti pop singer Lady Pasta, a parody of Lady Gaga, who showcases her singing talent and her new song. Orange then begins to annoy her with his own song.
35	31	"Cruel as a Cucumber"	2:25	July 30, 2010	15.61
Orange's conscience (a Devil Orange and an Angel Orange) try to help him impress Cucumber, the coolest food in the kitchen. Title Reference: Cool as a Cucumber
36	32	"Crabapple"	2:23	August 6, 2010	14.51
Orange meets a Crabapple (Ray William Johnson) with a surly demeanor, as well as Midget Apple, a minuscule Red delicious apple who prefers to be called "Little Apple." Midget Apple makes his debut appearance.
37	33	"Million Clones"	2:03	August 13, 2010	25.18
One million people have subscribed to Orange's YouTube channel. To celebrate, Orange gets cloned one million times, despite Pear's objections.
38	34	"Close Encounters of the Annoying Kind"	3:38	August 20, 2010	11.02
Orange and Pear are abducted by a race of broccoli aliens that want to dissect them, as well as other life forms that are potentially highly intelligent.
39	35	"The Sitcom"	4:09	August 27, 2010	11.71
The Annoying Orange becomes a sitcom, and after losing a poker game, Orange is forced by a bell pepper to admit how he feels about Passion.
40	36	"Going Walnuts"	2:39	September 3, 2010	13.85
Orange drives an easily irritable walnut (Julian Smith) nuts with puns and knock-knock jokes.
41	37	"Wazzup 3: Bonsai Tree"	2:07	September 16, 2010	12.77
A bonsai tree (voiced by Rivers Cuomo) and a party platter (voiced by the other members of Weezer) join Orange, Pear, and Midget Apple for yet another Budweiser commercial parody. Midget Apple becomes a permanent cast member in this episode.
42	38	"Annoying Saw 2: The Annoying Death Trap"	3:46	September 24, 2010	22.37
Jigsaw returns and tries to recruit Orange as his apprentice so he can annoy his next victim, a marshmallow, to death. However, the plan backfires when Marshmallow becomes a friend of Orange's and becomes too soft for the death trap to cut. Note: Marshmallow makes their debut appearance, and Charlie from Smosh guest stars as himself
43	39	"No More Mr. Knife Guy"	3:39	October 1, 2010	53.00
After a brief argument with a root of ginger over whether or not he has a soul, Orange and Pear meet Knife (who just chopped Ginger up), who discusses the difficulty of his life while Pear attempts to properly use a Ouija board. In the end, Knife reveals his greatest fear: a knife sharpener. Title Reference: No More Mr. Nice Guy
44	40	"Happy Birthday!"	3:47	October 8, 2010	21.24
Pear, Midget Apple, Marshmallow, and a lime throw a surprise party for Orange on his birthday. Marshmallow becomes a permanent cast member in this episode.
45	41	"The Exploding Orange"	4:25	October 15, 2010	14.05
Orange learns what happens when a fruit gets the hiccups as a kiwi explodes. Orange then gets the hiccups himself, and Pear and Passion attempt to cure them. Note: Smosh guest stars as a duo of bananas.
46	42	"Frankenfruit"	3:48	October 29, 2010	13.76
Pear and Midget Apple tell ghost stories for Halloween and the monsters in their stories come to life, including Frankenfruit, made up of all the fruits and vegetables Orange annoyed who got chopped up (including Grapefruit and Grandpa Lemon) and a cursed hot dog werewolf called the "Halloweenie." Grapefruit and Grandpa Lemon are revived in this episode. Title Reference: Frankenstein
47	43	"Theme Song Attack"	3:19	November 5, 2010	17.23
Orange finds out that Pear, Marshmallow, Midget Apple, Knife, and even a plum have their own theme songs, so he has Marshmallow and Midget Apple write one for him. Aaron Massey is the voice of Plum.
48	44	"The Annoying Pear"	3:07	November 12, 2010	11.11
Orange is sick, so Pear tries to be annoying for him. However, all he can do is make a turnip cry by calling him "Fat Radish." Richard Ryan is the voice of Turnip.
49	45	"Viral Vote"	1:33	November 19, 2010	3.762
Orange and the gang begin to hold a vote on which top five viral videos on YouTube they'll spoof.
50	46	"Orange After Dentist"	1:35	November 22, 2010	29.94
The first video of the contest held for which viral videos Orange and the gang would spoof. In a parody of "David After Dentist," in which Orange gets loopy on medicine after getting his teeth whitened.
51	47	"Kitchen Intruder"	2:12	November 23, 2010	15.35
"Bed Intruder Song" is the second viral video to be parodied. Nancy Nectarine almost gets chopped up, and her friend Orange portrays Antoine Dodson and performs the "Kitchen Intruder Song."
52	48	"Sneezing Marshmallow"	0:27	November 24, 2010	7.700
The third video of the contest parodies "The Sneezing Baby Panda." Marshmallow takes the role of the panda cub who sneezes so hard and loud he scares Orange, who takes on the mother panda role.
53	49	"Annoying Orange meets Charlie the Unicorn"	3:18	November 25, 2010	12.11
The fourth video of the contest is a parody of "Charlie the Unicorn." Orange and Marshmallow see a rainbow and make Charlie the Unicorn take them, along with Pear and Midget Apple, to the end of the rainbow to get a pot of gold, which is supposed to be at the end of the rainbow.
54	50	"Equals Annoying Orange"	3:40	November 26, 2010	7.226
The fifth and final video of the contest is a spoof of Ray William Johnson's "Equals Three." Orange showcases the other four winning videos and comments on them.
55	51	"Kitchen Intruder Song"	1:35	December 3, 2010	14.72
The full music video for the "Kitchen Intruder Song"
56	52	"Mystery of the Mustachios"	3:30	December 10, 2010	7.451
Orange and Pear meet five pistachios who wear fake mustaches to avoid being eaten. Craig Benzine is the voice of the Pistachios.
57	53	"Jalapeño"	3:40	December 17, 2010	15.28
Orange and Pear take advice from a suave Jalapeño (voiced by James Caan) on how to impress ladies as he seduces a bowl of fruit. Shira Lazar voices Peach.
58	54	"Wishful Thinking"	6:07	December 24, 2010	13.20
In a parody of It's a Wonderful Life, Orange wishes he'd never been born after he thinks he sees Passion Fruit kissing Pear during a Christmas party in the kitchen (when it really was her sister, Mandy). His wish is foreseen by a floating sprig of mistletoe (Liam the Leprechaun in disguise) who shows him what life would be like without him, with disastrous outcomes (e.g. Pear trying to find a best friend, Midget Apple beating up Grapefruit, and Marshmallow being burned alive in hot cocoa). In the end, it turns out Liam only wanted to come to Orange's Christmas party. Grandpa Lemon becomes a permanent cast member with this episode.

=== Season 3 (2011) ===
No. overall	No. in season	Title	Time	Original release date	Online viewers (millions)
59	1	"The Amnesiac Orange"	4:19	January 7, 2011	26.36
After a cantaloupe falls on Orange, he develops a severe case of amnesia. Aaron Massey as Apple, Bobjenz as Cantaloupe, Lisa Schwartz as Balloon
60	2	"Rap-Berry"	4:13	January 14, 2011	12.36
A raspberry named Red leaves his bowl looking for adventure, but freaks out when he finds that he is in the kitchen where Orange and his friends live. Scared he'll get knifed or suffer another horrible death, Orange and Pear, who're willing to work together and help him survive, help by fostering his rapping talent. Richard Ryan as Red Raspberry
61	3	"Food Court"	5:00	January 21, 2011	7.133
Liam the Leprechaun returns to get revenge on Orange, taking him to court to find out if he is truly annoying. Aaron Massey as Radish, Kevin Brueck as Bailiff Apple, Peter Coffin as Onion
62	4	"Wazzup Blowup"	3:08	January 28, 2011	14.77
In another Budweiser commercial parody, Orange and his friends annoy an ear of corn while he waits for an important phone call. Rafi Fine as Cob
63	5	"Best Fiends Forever"	4:15	February 4, 2011	9.210
Grapefruit moves into the kitchen and starts causing trouble by yelling "Knife!" at the wrong time, offending Celery, calling Midget Apple "Baby Apple," and burning Marshmallow's photograph of their friend, Princess Butterflykiss the unicorn, which ultimately throws Marshmallow over the edge. With this episode, Grapefruit becomes a permanent member of the cast.
64a	6a	"Annoying Valentines"	2:57	February 11, 2011	8.641
Orange gives out annoying Valentine cards because he does not know the true meaning of Valentine's Day.
64b	6b	"Annoying Valentines (Sitcom Version)"	3:45	February 11, 2011	1.991
An extended version of "Annoying Valentines" in the same format as "The Sitcom."
65	7	"It Takes Two to Mango"	2:59	February 18, 2011	20.41
Orange annoys a mango who believes there is a hidden motive behind his annoying behavior. Steve Greene as Mango
66	8	"ZOOM!!!"	3:00	February 25, 2011	19.44
While annoying a baby carrot, Orange becomes incredibly hyperactive when he accidentally ingests ZOOM, a highly caffeinated energy drink. Bobjenz as ZOOM
67	9	"Annoying Orange Through Time"	0:56	March 4, 2011	24.82
Orange visits the Cretaceous extinction event, Benjamin Franklin's discovery of lightning, and the sinking of the RMS Titanic.
68	10	"Kung Fruit"	4:05	March 11, 2011	19.71
Orange undergoes ninja training from the apple martial artist Ninja Fruit after a nunchaku-wielding coconut takes over the kitchen. Shane Dawson as Coconut, Askaninja as Ninja Fruit
69a	11a	"Fortune Cookie"	2:44	March 18, 2011	19.01
Orange annoys a fortune cookie and learns about written fortune. Chad Sahley voices Fortune Cookie, Bobjenz voices Eggroll, Rachel Emmers voices Miss Fortune Cookie
69b	11b	"Fortune Cookie (Sitcom Version)"	3:25	March 18, 2011	1.388
An extended version of "Fortune Cookie" in the same format as "The Sitcom."
70	12	"April Fruit's Day"	3:21	April 1, 2011	57.96
Orange and the gang prank each other on April Fools' Day by wearing disguises. Jenya Lano voices Tomato
71	13	"Kitchen Carnage"	3:21	April 7, 2011	148.6
Orange and a bunch of other fruits look at ingredient lists for a salad and a smoothie and believe they are team lineups for a sports match, but only Pear seems to realize that it is not a game. roster.: Joe Nation voices Apple; Olga Kay voices Lettuce; Jacksfilms voices Kiwis
72	14	"Rolling in the Dough"	3:25	April 15, 2011	239.1
Orange annoys a lump of bread dough through the whole process of making bread.: Tobuscus voices Dough, as well as his stages as a bread loaf and heel of toast; Bobjenz voices Butter; Kevin Brueck voices Flour
73	15	"Comedy Clubbing"	3:10	April 22, 2011	6.616
Orange, Pear, and Midget Apple go to a comedy club where Orange engages in an insult/pun war with the headliner, Marty Meatball (voiced by Greg Benson), after not finding him funny.
74	16	"Annoying Orange Through Time #2"	1:13	April 29, 2011	10.44
Orange visits the battle of David and Goliath, Isaac Newton's discovery of gravity, and the Roswell UFO incident. Tristopia voices Isaac Newton
75	17	"Mommy and Me"	3:23	May 6, 2011	39.04
Orange's mother comes to visit as she and Orange annoy a yam.: Michael Gallager voices Yam; Kevin Nalty voices Knife; Joey Nalty voices Knife's mom
76	18	"Fruit For All"	3:43	May 12, 2011	5.888
In a parody of Jeopardy!, Orange appears on the game show Fruit For All and annoys the host (Apple Trebek), and the contestants, Banana and Pineapple.: Kevin Brueck voices Apple Trebek and Banana; Bobjenz voices Pineapple
77	19	"Juice Boxing"	3:21	May 20, 2011	11.73
it is a hot day in the kitchen, as Orange annoys two juice boxes. This episode also had a rare sitcom version which was founded on the Annoying Orange website around 2013. Note: Luke Barats voices Cherry Juice Box; Joe Bereta voices Blue Raspberry Juice Box; Bobjenz voices Thermometer and Toaster
78	20	"Flower Power"	3:33	May 27, 2011	7.019
A sunflower gets in Orange's way while he is enjoying the sun. As a result, Orange annoys him. Michael Buckley voices Sunflower
79	21	"Be a star!"	3:22	June 3, 2011	6.552
The star Orange make video action, Pear make video camera. Star party pains wait come from.
80	22	"First Person Fruiter"	3:09	June 10, 2011	8.340
The viewers take the first-person perspective of a papaya during an encounter with Orange. Note: Kevin Brueck voices Papaya; Bobjenz voices Apple
81	23	"Meteortron"	4:42	June 17, 2011	9.783
In a parody of the Transformers film, the meteor-like shape-shifting robot Meteortron crash-lands in the kitchen, demanding to find the "relic." The episode features the winner of the "Be a Star!" contest, Mark Boyanowski, appearing as a star in space.
82	24	"YouTubers"	3:47	July 1, 2011	4.808
Orange meets a trio of potato You Tubers who are trying to make a hit video.: Shaycarl voices Shay Red; Charles Trippy voices Trippotato; Will of DC voices Tater of DC
83	25	"Trollin'"	4:12	July 8, 2011	7.760
The kitchen is invaded by three troll dolls who criticize the show.: Aaron Massey voices Purple-Haired Troll; Kevin Brueck voices Orange-Haired Troll; Bobjenz voices Blue-Haired Troll
84	26	"Orange Potter and the Deathly Apple"	4:20	July 13, 2011	14.63
In a parody of Harry Potter and the Deathly Hallows, Orange Potter goes head to head with his mortal enemy, Moldywarts. The other main characters take on the roles of other Harry Potter characters, featuring Pear Weasley, Grandpa Lemondore, Passiony Granger, and Professor Snapefruit. Benny Fine voices Moldywarts
85	27a	"The Voodoo You Do!"	3:34	July 22, 2011	13.99
Three witch doctor apples, Jack, Bill, and Andy, attempt to torture Orange with a voodoo doll, but instead, the apples get tortured by the doll, who becomes as annoying as Orange. There is also a rare sitcom version of this episode: Steve Greene voices Jack; Jason Horton voices Bill; Bobjenz voices Andy
85	27b	"The Voodoo You Do!(Sitcom Version)"	4:08	2011	13.99
An extended version of “The Voodoo You Do!” in the same format as “The Sitcom”. “””Note”””: The video was founded and preserved on YouTube in 2019 by a user named Michael Alameda (Famicom Gamer)
86	28	"Orange Goes Hollywood"	4:13	July 29, 2011	9.391
Two corn cobs offer Orange a chance to be in a Hollywood movie, but things go bad when the cobs begin make alterations to the show, including replacing Pear and Midget Apple.
87	29	"Previously On"	4:11	August 5, 2011	10.04
The viewers are shown a thrilling recap of the previous episode. Ironically, the clips shown were never part of an episode, and also does not relate to the "thrilling conclusion" shown after the recap.
88	30	"In the Dark"	2:56	August 12, 2011	10.17
Orange meets a clueless mushroom, who starts to act like Orange as they both annoy Midget Apple.
89	31	"Naval Orange"	4:48	August 26, 2011	5.795
Orange, Pear, Midget Apple, and Marshmallow go on vacation in the bathtub. They end up running into the infamous pirate, Blueberry Beard and his crew of blueberries, who demand to get back their scouting vessel (a rubber duck).
90	32	"Annoying Orange Through Time #3"	1:34	September 2, 2011	6.791
Orange visits the Trojan Horse siege, the Lunar Flag Assembly being placed on the Moon, George Washington chopping down a cherry tree, and the Great Sphinx of Giza losing its nose. In an extended version, Orange also annoys the Leaning Tower of Pisa and causes it to lean by spitting a seed.
91	33	"Gumbrawl"	3:40	September 9, 2011	62.39
After Orange witnesses a gummy worm multiplying after being knifed into pieces, he then witnesses the gummy worms, an army of gummy bears, a pack of chewing gum, and some gumdrops find themselves in the middle of a battle for supremacy.
92	34	"Pet Peeve"	3:39	September 16, 2011	25.39
Orange adopts a fruit fly (whom he names Spot) as a pet, which immediately starts creating havoc by attacking the fruits in the kitchen.
93	35	"Souper Dooper"	3:51	September 23, 2011	11.26
Orange meets a bowl of alphabet soup and makes him boil by annoying him.
94	35	"Ask Orange #1"	2:53	September 26, 2011	6.614
Orange answers questions from viewers.
95	36	"Fake 'N Bacon"	3:40	September 30, 2011	7.878
Orange meets three plastic fruits who pretend to be real fruits, to try to convince him that they are truly real.
96	37	"Annoying Orange Through Time #4"	1:25	October 3, 2011	8.060
Orange visits a gladiator battle, the first Thanksgiving feast, and Vincent van Gogh chopping his ear off.
97	38	"Annoying Orange vs. Angry Birds"	7:46 (combined)	October 7, 2011	118.5 (combined)
Orange and his friends play Angry Birds, using themselves as the birds, and the pigs being themselves.
98	39	"Microwave Effect"	5:14	October 14, 2011	12.69
A tinfoil-wrapped burrito is placed into the kitchen microwave, and it sends Orange and his friends back in time to the pilot episode, where viewers find out what it would be like if the apple Orange first annoyed had not been knifed, resulting in him dominating the kitchen and enslaving other fruits.
99	40	"Ask Orange #2: Toastbusters!"	3:47	October 21, 2011	6.542
Orange answers more questions from viewers, followed by a spoof of Ghostbusters called Toastbusters.
100	41	"Chiller"	3:49	October 28, 2011	14.42
Pear has a dream of a haunted freezer called the Chiller, where the gang turns into zombies and Orange performs a parody of Michael Jackson's Thriller.
101	42	"Magic Clam"	3:32	November 4, 2011	6.880
Orange and his friends wake up in the middle of the night and find an oyster in the kitchen that can eat different objects, transforming them after doing so. The oyster eats a penny, which turns into a copper Abraham Lincoln figurine (named Copper Lincoln, whom eventually becomes a recurring character), and Midget Apple, who becomes bigger.
102	43	"Jumping Bean"	3:28	November 11, 2011	3.693
Orange meets a jumping bean (voiced by John Leguizamo) who cannot stop bouncing around.
103	44	"Party Rock"	2:38	November 21, 2011	20.49
In the first video of a viral video week, Orange and his friends perform a spoof of "Party Rock Anthem" with Party Rock. DeStorm Power stars as Party Rock.
104	45	"Epic Peel Time"	2:46	November 22, 2011	7.676
In the second video of the viral video week, Orange, Pear Glasses, and the gang mash up a ball of pork, cheese, bacon, and other ingredients together to create a meal that looks like Orange with a beard, parodying Epic Meal Time.
105	46	"Epic Rap Battles of Kitchenry"	1:44	November 23, 2011	24.02
In the third video of the viral video week, Orange rap battles the candy coated chocolate rapper Em&Em (voiced by Nice Peter), who is a spoof of Eminem parodying Epic Rap Battles of History.
106	47	"GO! BWAAAH!"	0:17	November 24, 2011	3.465
In the fourth video of the viral video week, Orange falls off Grandpa Lemon's motorcycle in a spoof of "Go! Bwaaah!"
107	48	"Talking Twin Baby Oranges"	1:11	November 24, 2011	8.321
In the fifth video of the viral video week, two Oranges spoof "Talking Twin Babies."
108	49	"Fry-Day"	2:15	November 25, 2011	140.5
In the final video of the viral video week, Orange performs a spoof of the Rebecca Black song "Friday" as he and the gang go to TGI Fry-days for a French fry feast.
109	50	"Ask Orange #3: A-TOY-ING ORANGE!"	3:41	December 2, 2011	8.178
Orange answers more questions by viewers, including his wish (tricked into its granting by Liam the Leprechaun) to be a toy.
110	51	"Grapefruit's Totally True Tales: Bigfoot"	3:16	December 9, 2011	3.383
Grapefruit tells a story to his nephew about how he caught Bigfoot, although he did not really catch him, as pointed out by his nephew.
111	52	"Xmas Card Xplosion!!"	8:50 (combined)	December 16, 2011	18.86 (combined)
Orange and the gang decide to make six different video cards for Christmas for the fans. The cards can all be seen at the end of the video
112	53	"Midget Rudolph"	2:13	December 23, 2011	5.483
Santa Claus asks for Midget Apple's help when he glows bright red after taking a bath, while Orange performs a parody of "Rudolph the Red-Nosed Reindeer".

=== Season 4 (2012) ===
No. overall	No. in season	Title	Time	Original release date	Online viewers (millions)
117	1	"FPS Orange"	2:37	January 6, 2012	5.723
Orange introduces the 50-Caliber Kitchen Cannon and uses it to fire various ammunition and destroy the moon.
118	2	"1 BILLION KILLS!"	3:08	January 13, 2012	7.903
To celebrate a total of a billion video views throughout the series, the episode features a compilation of all the deaths from the series thus far.
119	3	"Once Upon an Orange"	2:20	January 20, 2012	7.206
Orange travels through famous fairy tales, annoying the Three Little Pigs, Jack from Jack and the Beanstalk, and Hansel and Gretel.
120	4	"Annoying Orange Comedy Roast"	4:34	January 27, 2012	4.205
Celebrities that have starred in previous episodes return to make fun of Orange at a roast, hosted by a pot roast. Featured celebrities include Philip DeFranco, Smosh, KassemG, Joe Penna, Michael Buckley, DeStorm Power, Tobuscus, Zackscott, the Fine Bros, Steve Greene, and Barats and Bereta.
121	5	"The Fruitbowl"	4:18	February 3, 2012	4.431
The New York Gi-Apples play against the New England Plantains in Fruit Bowl XLVI, but things go awry when Midget Apple is mistaken for the ball.
122	6	"The Dating Game"	3:56	February 10, 2012	4.681
Passion Fruit competes on a dating show with a nerdy apple, a French pomegranate, and Orange.
123	7	"Poison Apple"	3:34	February 17, 2012	3.897
Orange tries to help the Magic Mirror find a poison apple for Snow White to eat while he annoys him.
124	8	"He Will Mock You"	2:57	February 24, 2012	64.34
When a coconut, lime, and a banana come into the kitchen and mock Orange, he, Pear, Midget Apple, and Marshmallow immediately fire back with a parody of We Will Rock You.
125	9	"Annoying Orange vs. Mortal Kombat"	2:44	March 2, 2012	40.16
Orange ends up in the game Mortal Kombat and does battle with Shang Tsung, who takes the forms of Kitana, Reptile, Sub-Zero and Scorpion, but loses to Orange anyway.
126	10	"Ultimate Marshmallow Tease"	1:39	March 5, 2012	2.489
Daneboe teases Marshmallow in a spoof of the viral video "Ultimate Dog Tease."
127	11	"Dr. Bananas"	3:29	March 9, 2012	9.189
A banana named Dr. Bananas comes into the kitchen to show off his new inventions to Orange, Pear, and Midget Apple.
128	12	"The Leprechaun Trap"	3:04	March 16, 2012	6.859
In a fake commercial, Orange pitches a product called "The Leprechaun Trap" to stop leprechauns from stealing pots of gold, and Liam the Leprechaun is used as a demonstration.
129	13	"The Hungry Games"	3:46	March 23, 2012	10.70
Orange and Claudius Cauliflower host the 74th annual Hungry Games where foods fight to the death. However, things go awry when Orange encounters Sugarcane and President Snowball.
130	14	"Annoying Orange 2.0!!!"	4:30	March 30, 2012	5.945
In another April Fools' Day episode, Orange and the gang leave the kitchen for their upcoming Cartoon Network show, leaving Midget Apple behind. Celebrities such as Tom Cruise, Denzel Washington, Meryl Streep, Robert De Niro, Gollum and Christopher Walken take over the roles of the regular gang, freaking Midget Apple out. Note: This video was made to promote their upcoming Cartoon Network Show, The High Fructose Adventures of Annoying Orange.
131	15	"Easter Island"	3:25	April 6, 2012	5.707
Orange and his friends travel to Easter Island, but things go bad when Orange awakens and disturbs a Peep (the keeper of the Island) from a volcano via his annoyingness.
132	16	"Marshmallow's Favorites: Doggy Videos"	2:13 (combined)	April 9, 2012	2.240 (combined)
Marshmallow shares his five favorite dog videos that have been uploaded to YouTube with Midget Apple. A playlist of twelve such videos was released with the episode.
133	17	"Ask Orange #4: Master Chef!"	3:50	April 13, 2012	4.728
Orange answers more questions submitted by fans, also meeting Master Chief from the Halo series.
134	18	"WazZOOM"	2:39	April 20, 2012	7.564
Orange, Pear, Midget Apple, Marshmallow, Grapefruit, Grandpa Lemon, Zoom, Squash, Zombie George Washington, Spelling Bee, a strawberry, and a newly introduced energy drink called Zip perform another "Whassup?" parody, but they say "WazZOOM" instead to keep things fresh.
135	19	"Buddy Cops"	4:06	April 27, 2012	8.063
Midget Apple and Marshmallow become buddy cops to track a cereal killer that is killing various foods, and interrogate a box of bran flakes.
136	20	"Bacon Invaders"	3:52	May 4, 2012	17.13
Orange and his friends get attacked by an evil strip of bacon who plans to wrap every kitchen inhabitant in his own army of bacon strips. However, Midget Apple discovers a gas leak, which fries all the bacon after getting hit by Grandpa Lemon's haywire motorcycle.
137	21	"U Can't Squash This"	2:29	May 11, 2012	7.425
Orange, Pear, Midget Apple, and Marshmallow dance and sing a song called "U Can't Squash This". A parody of "U Can't Touch This" as Squash squashes several foods from the kitchen.
138	22	"Tough Enough"	4:13	May 25, 2012	74.23
Orange meets a tough durian named Spike.
139	23	"Big Top Orange"	3:47	June 1, 2012	5.053
Orange and the gang try out for Big Top's circus with the cast of Madagascar, spoofing the new film Madagascar 3. Special Guest Stars: Chris Rock as Marty, Sacha Baron Cohen as King Julien and Cedric the Entertainer as Maurice
140	24	"Avocadbro"	3:33	June 8, 2012	3.706
Orange meets and annoys a laid-back avocado, who teaches Orange how to meditate so he can relax and not be annoying.
141	25	"Behind the Seeds"	4:01	June 11, 2012	1.063
Orange goes behind the scenes of his new T.V. show and interviews people who work for the show. Note: This episode was released a few hours before the show premiere.
142	26	"Ask Orange #5: Once in a Blew Moon!"	3:01	June 15, 2012	6.464
Orange answers more questions submitted by fans. The episode also marks the return of the 50 Caliber Kitchen Cannon.
143	27	"OMG"	3:24	June 22, 2012	2.973
Orange and his friends report the lives of some popular fruit celebrities on their gossip TV show, OMG.
144	28	"Going Donuts"	3:54	July 6, 2012	3.779
Orange annoys a plain donut.
145	29	"The Fruitrix"	4:14	July 13, 2012	5.029
When Orange finds out from a spoon that he is stuck in a dream kitchen called the Fruitrix, he goes on a quest to escape and save his friends.
146	30	"Mac & Cheese: Men in Snack"	4:15	July 20, 2012	4.168
Special agents Mac & Cheese investigate a series of deaths in the kitchen, with Orange and Midget Apple as witnesses.
147	31	"Animated"	1:44	July 27, 2012	27.15
Orange, Pear, and Apple relive the first episode of Annoying Orange, except this time it is animated.
148	32	"Fruits vs. Zombies"	12:28 (combined)	August 3, 2012	145.7 (combined)
The fruits play a game of Plants vs. Zombies.
149	33	"Summer Vacation"	1:10	August 10, 2012	1.518
Orange tells the fans that he and the gang are going on vacation and will not be uploading videos until September 7. Also, Marshmallow announces a new picture contest for the fans. Meanwhile, Grapefruit secretly reads Twilight while he is alone in the kitchen.
150	34	"Marshmallow Pic Contest Winners!"	1:33	September 7, 2012	2.196
Marshmallow announces the winners of his picture contest that he held back in August.
151	35	"ORANGE NYA NYA STYLE"	2:20	September 14, 2012	178.8
Orange and the gang spoof the viral YouTube music video Gangnam Style.
152	36	"Buddy Cops 2: Stachehouse"	4:52	September 21, 2012	5.449
Midget Apple and Marshmallow are back as Buddy Cops, and this time they are tracking down Mango LeStache, a former criminal turned mustache specializing fashion designer, who is a suspect of selling exploding counterfeit mustaches.
153	37	"Monster Burger!"	3:58	September 28, 2012	96.85
Orange meets a hamburger and thinks that he is a monster, going so far as to shoot at it with a machine gun. After the hamburger convinces Orange that he is not a monster, he unsurprisingly gets annoyed by him.
154	38	"Clam's Casino"	4:12	October 5, 2012	4.912
Orange and the gang meet Johnny Clam, a clam and biggest name in the casino business who turns the kitchen into a casino and tricks Orange and the gang into gambling and losing their money.
155	39	"Pit Romney Presidential Campaign Video"	1:08	October 17, 2012	0.981
Pit Romney shows what he would do if he was president of the kitchen.
156	40	"Broccoli Obama Presidential Campaign Video"	1:29	October 17, 2012	1.164
Broccoli Obama shows what he would do if he was president of the kitchen.
157	41	"Kitchen Decision 2012"	4:15	October 19, 2012	2.322
A presidential debate occurs in the kitchen, Broccoli Obama and Pit Romney answer different questions asked by Orange (the moderator) and the gang, and many fruits and objects living in the kitchen to see who they want as president of the kitchen. However, a destructive and furious gyro angrily interrupts the debates, becoming an independent nominee.
158	42	"TV of TERROR!"	4:23	October 26, 2012	12.99
After realizing they are using an old haunted TV for their scary movie sleepover, the TV sucks Orange and the gang into many horror movies based on real Halloween horror movies, such as The Sixth Sense, Halloween, Dracula, A Nightmare on Elm Street, The Mummy, and Paranormal Activity.
159	43	"Leek of Their Own"	3:30	November 2, 2012	2.415
Orange meets a leek and a green onion whom he calls Grunion, and annoys them by "gleeking" – spraying juice from his mouth.
160	44	"New Kitchen President!"	1:14	November 6, 2012	1.754
Marshmallow becomes kitchen president via a write-in ballot, which results in the worst destruction from Gyro.
161	45	"Time to Burn"	3:30	November 9, 2012	52.16
Orange drinks a whole bottle of hot sauce and creates chaos around the world thanks to the propulsion of his fire breath.
162	46	"Ask Orange #6: Fart Ship!"	3:27	November 16, 2012	4.338
Orange answers more questions submitted by fans.
163	47	"Ask President Marshmallow #1"	3:13	November 19, 2012	4.613
Marshmallow answers presidential related questions from the fans.
164	48	"WAZZUP Video Game Style!"	1:12	November 20, 2012	4.643
Orange, two bananas, a lemon, a kiwi, and an apple relive the first "Wazzup?" video, except this time it is done video game style.
165	49	"Saw: Animated!"	2:44	November 21, 2012	4.365
Orange, Jigsaw, and Eggplant relive the first "Saw" video, animated.
166	50	"Lady Pasta ANIMATED!"	3:05	November 22, 2012	4.207
Orange and Lady Pasta relive the "Lady Pasta" video, animated. Some scenes in this version of "Lady Pasta" were not in the original "Lady Pasta" video.
167	51	"Kitchen-mon!"	2:55	November 23, 2012	16.84
After a Pokéball comes into the kitchen and gets knifed, it creates an anime world in which Orange and Grapefruit have an animated Kitchen-Mon battle.
168	52	"Christmas is for Giving"	1:58	November 30, 2012	2.898
Orange sings about giving gifts on Christmas, such as a bowl of bees, an exploding piece of pie, a seatless chair, and a beet with macaroni glued to it.
169	53	"Annoying Ways to Die"	2:39	December 7, 2012	61.55
Orange and many other foods sing a parody of the viral video Dumb Ways to Die.
170	54	"Garret the Parrot"	2:43	December 14, 2012	1.443
Orange made friends together with a parrot named Garret and they mimic each other, annoying the carrot.
171	55	"Weird Al Holiday Duet!"	1:28	December 17, 2012	1.196
Orange and Weird Al Yankovic sing a holiday duet together. This scene was from The High Fructose Adventures of Annoying Orange Season 1: Episode 19, "Generic Holiday Special." Special Guest Star: Weird Al Yankovic as himself.
172	56	"Cheesy Salesman"	3:45	December 21, 2012	1.993
Orange, Pear, and Orange's wish list meet the Cheesy Salesman and his partner, Salesham, who try to sell them various things.
173	57	"2012 KILLS MONTAGE!"	3:22	December 28, 2012	5.012
Orange shows all the deaths from "The Annoying Orange" that occurred in the year 2012.

=== Season 5 (2013) ===
No. overall	No. in season	Title	Time	Original release date	Online viewers (in millions)
174	1	"Ask Orange #7: FUS RO DAH!"	3:20	January 18, 2013	19.99
Orange answers more questions submitted by the fans of The Annoying Orange, and also performs a "Fus Ro Dah" attack (from the Elder Scrolls series) on Pear.
175	2	"Yo-Yo!"	3:30	January 25, 2013	21.45
Orange meets Yo-yo and thinks he is a dog.
176	3	"Annoying Orange vs. Slender Man"	3:25	February 1, 2013	23.56
Orange, Pear, and Midget Apple split up to hunt down Slender Man in the forest.
177	4	"Pickleback"	4:06	February 8, 2013	24.85
Orange meets the worst band in the kitchen: Pickleback (parody of Nickelback), whose songs apparently brainwash others into liking their music. They reveal that they are brainwashing fruits and vegetables to pickle them, as they feel discriminated against as people think that only cucumbers can be pickled.
178	5	"Harlem Shake v9000 (Annoying Orange Edition)"	0:41	February 9, 2013	35.13
Orange and the gang dance to the Harlem Shake.
179	6	"Random Cuts #01"	2:29	February 15, 2013	21.35
Random gags involving talking food, brought to you by Orange.
180	7	"Annoying Orange vs. Pong"	1:22	February 18, 2013	25.87
Orange gets very bored while playing with the Pong paddles because of how easy and dull the game is.
181	8	"The Weenies"	3:33	February 22, 2013	30.31
Grandpa Lemon presents the 2013 Weenie Awards, the winner being Hero Shark Birdy.
182	9	"Annoying Orange Subscribe Trailer"	0:31	February 27, 2013	18.96
An announcement for episodes every Friday on Orange's YouTube Channel.
183	10	"No More Mr. Knife Guy (Song)"	1:51	March 1, 2013	29.04
A song and music video parody of "No More Mr. Nice Guy" by Alice Cooper, performed by Peter Coffin, references the episode of the same name that debuted on October 1, 2010.
184	11	"Popeye Yeah!"	3:28	March 8, 2013	31.50
Orange annoys Papaya, thinking he is Popeye, and after Olive Oil is tipped over and begins to spill out, he persuades Papaya to save her.
185	12	"Annoying Orange vs. Minecraft"	3:20	March 15, 2013	22.22
Orange meets Steve in Minecraft.
186	13	"Annoying Marshmallow"	3:48	March 22, 2013	32.23
Orange takes a break from being annoying and has Marshmallow be annoying for him. However, he only does cute things which Pear and Can Of Chili enjoy.
187	14	"Annoying Orange vs. Duck Hunt"	1:14	March 25, 2013	21.34
Orange plays the role of the Dog from Duck Hunt.
188	15	"April Fool's Gold"	4:02	March 29, 2013	17.51
Liam disguises as Orange and begins using mean-spirited April Fool's jokes to get back at the other fruits after falling for a lottery trick.
189	16	"Top 5 Ways To Get Out Of A Speeding Ticket"	2:44	April 5, 2013	20.13
Orange explains the top 5 ways to get out of a speeding ticket.
190	17	"Beauty and a Beet"	2:28	April 12, 2013	23.16
Orange sings a parody of "Beauty and a Beat" by Justin Bieber featuring Nicki Minaj, as multiple beets are smashed, blown up, and knifed during the song.
191	18	"Earth Day"	3:59	April 19, 2013	32.67
On Earth Day, Orange falls asleep, and in a dream, he meets Earth and begins to learn why she must be saved from environmental disasters.
192	19	"Iron Apple Teaser Trailer"	0:55	April 26, 2013	22.67
An announcement for the next week's episode, "Iron Apple."
193	20	"Iron Apple"	4:01	May 3, 2013	28.53
Midget Apple becomes Iron Apple and fights a possessed Mandarin Orange.
194	21	"Ask Orange #8: Evil Robot Twin"	3:08	May 10, 2013	31.34
Orange answers more questions submitted by the fans. The episode also introduces Orange's nefarious robotic twin.
195	22	"Despicable Me 2: Choose Your Villain!"	3:05	May 15, 2013	20.01
As the new movie trailer for Despicable Me 2 will be released on July 3, 2013, a parody of the film will be made, and fans will get to vote on which of Orange's friends will take the role of the villain. Viewers could vote for the Pear-asite, Dr. Apefruit, and Mighty Mega Mecha Apple.
196	23	"EPIC TRAILER! (Season 2 on Cartoon Network at 7:30/6:30c!!!)"	2:34	May 16, 2013	19.31
The new episode of Annoying Orange airs today on Cartoon Network at 7:30/6:30c. This time, Orange and his friends parody various movies.
197	24	"Honey, I Shrunk the Fruits"	4:10	May 17, 2013	21.42
A revived Dr. Bananas accidentally shrinks Orange and friends to the size of crumbs with his new invention, the Shrinky-Dinky Fruitilizer Minimizer.
198	25	"Snack Attack"	3:24	May 24, 2013	40.31
Orange, Pear, and Midget Apple go to a stadium where they meet a bunch of drinks, including a left-out Prune Juice (voiced by Jamie Oliver), whose dream is to be consumed.
199	26	"Monster Truck"	2:50	May 31, 2013	22.37
Midget Apple sings a song about his monster truck, to the tune of Thunderstruck by AC/DC.
200	27	"BORED!"	3:09	June 7, 2013	17.85
While Orange is bored, he meets three boards of wood, who he thinks are the same. He believes after the first two were sawed in half, every time he says, "board," he reappears.
201	28	"Blow Bubbles By Daft Lunch"	2:38	June 14, 2013	23.98
Orange sings a song called Blow Bubbles, a parody of Daft Punk's song "Get Lucky."
202	29	"Despicable Me Too"	4:34	June 21, 2013	20.91
In a parody of Despicable Me 2, Orange must save the world from the Pear-asite and retrieve the Leaning Tower of Pizza, which the Pear-asite had stolen.
203	30	"Grapefruit vs. Donkey Kong"	1:06	June 24, 2013	19.93
Grapefruit tries to save Passion Fruit from Donkey Kong.
204	31	"Man of Peel"	1:38	June 26, 2013	22.83
Orange becomes Super Annoying Orange, otherwise known as the "Man of Peel" in a parody of Man of Steel.
205	32	"Picnic Massacre"	3:05	June 28, 2013	41.46
Orange and the gang go to a picnic to try to have fun, but instead they experience massive carnage as foreseen by the warnings of Basket.
206	33	"Orange Approved: Chainy the Chainsaw"	1:52	July 1, 2013	17.61
A song is sung about a chainsaw named Chainy and his ability to cut many things, but how he hated ending up killing his pals.
207	34	"Nude Dude"	2:46	July 5, 2013	26.91
Orange meets an apple who he actually enjoys, but when he gets peeled, things get crazy when Orange and Apple begin making nude jokes, disturbing Potato.
208	35	"The Juice #1"	2:23	July 8, 2013	38.53
Orange, Pear, Midget Apple, Marshmallow, and Grapefruit introduce a new talk show and answer a question of whether they want to be a vampire, a werewolf or a ghost.
209	36	"Out of the Blue"	4:14	July 12, 2013	31.52
Orange tries to find a way to turn blue just like the rest of the gang so they can cosplay for the theater release of The Smurfs 2.
210	37	"Arnold SchwarzenEGGer"	3:15	July 19, 2013	34.68
Orange meets Arnold Schwarzenegger, the tough and nearly unbreakable egg who soon hatches into a destructive Terminator Egg.
211	38	"Annoying Orange vs. Mario Kart"	1:04	July 22, 2013	33.41
Orange visits the game Super Mario Kart, and accidentally ruins the race by spitting his juice on the track, causing the racers to spin out and crash.
212	39	"Grumpy Old Fruits"	3:54	July 26, 2013	35.72
Grandpa Lemon meets his old friend Plum, and Orange is annoyed by the old fruits.
213	40	"Mystery of the Sasquatch"	3:35	August 2, 2013	29.65
Orange and Pear are in the forest, when they find a Sasquatch Store with souvenirs themed after the mythical Sasquatch.
214	41	"Orange Approved – Meteor Sandwich"	1:47	August 5, 2013	18.62
A song is sung about a boy that eats a meteor sandwich that gives him magical powers.
215	42	"Random Cuts #2"	2:41	August 9, 2013	TBA
More random gags with talking food in the second Random Cuts video.
216	43	"Asteroranges (Asteroids video Game Spoof!)"	1:18	August 12, 2013	23.88
Orange spoofs the video game Asteroids in which whenever he gets hit by the spaceship's laser, he explodes into multiple miniature Oranges.
217	44	"Grape Expectations (Ft. Chester See & Jack Vale)"	3:26	August 16, 2013	19.31
Orange and Pear meet 3 grapes that try to become raisins by tanning. The two also meet Yogi, a yogurt coated grape who is treated as an outcast by the other grapes because his yogurt coating prevents him from getting tanned.
218	45	"Annoying Orange vs. Tiny Wings"	2:02	August 19, 2013	43.13
Orange races against Flami, Peck, and Owel from Tiny Wings in a race.
219	46	"Epic Rap Battles of Kitchenry #2"	2:11	August 23, 2013	17.82
This time in this rap battle, it is Midget Apple vs. Biggie Fries (voiced by EpicLLOYD).
220	47	"Annoying Orange vs. Street Fighter"	2:03	August 26, 2013	36.26
Orange takes on Ryu in Street Fighter
221	48	"Wasabi Goatee Party"	3:19	August 30, 2013	31.49
Orange and the gang have a goatee party with two dollops of goatee-wearing wasabi who have stolen the coveted Goatee Gun.
222	49	"Easy As Pi"	2:39	September 6, 2013	39.51
Orange's substitute math teacher Professor Pie attempts to teach despite getting fractions of him cut off by Knife.
223	50	"Foodsplosion #1"	3:58	September 7, 2013	35.16
Orange stars as the host of the game show Foodsplosion, where foods of all kinds ask a question and no matter if they are right and wrong, they win a prize, which ends up killing them. This Episode's Guest: Andy the Apple Prize: Sledgehammer
224	51	"Top 5 Ways To Get Out Of Your Homework"	2:36	September 9, 2013	24.82
Orange presents the top 5 ways to get out of doing homework.
225	52	"Insta-Graham"	3:29	September 13, 2013	31.73
Orange meets the app Instagram who is disguised herself as a graham cracker so she will not end up boring and unused until she gets caught by the vine and the Snapchat ghost eats her.
226	53	"The Juice #2: Goose-Moose"	2:54	September 16, 2013	29.56
The second episode of The Juice, in which the gang are asked who they would eat first if they were stuck on a desert island.
227	54	"The Sock (What Does The Sock Say? Ylvis Parody)"	3:04	September 20, 2013	33.72
Orange sings a song in the tune of Ylvis' "What Does The Fox Say" so Baby Carrot can learn his kitchen sounds, but he becomes confused when Orange apparently teaches him the incorrect sound made by the sock.
228	55	"FOODSPLOSION #2: Wanda Watermelon"	2:00	September 23, 2013	27.21
Orange stars as the host of the game show Foodsplosion, where foods of all kinds ask a question and no matter if they are right and wrong, they win a prize, which ends up killing them. This Episode's Guest: Wanda Watermelon Prize: Cinder Block
229	56	"Breaking Bad Eggs"	4:45	September 27, 2013	18.62
The gang is ready to go on a camping trip adventure, but the despicable Walter Eggwhite AKA Eggsenberg ruins it with his illegal hot sauce business.
230	57	"Shocktober!!!"	2:58	September 30, 2013	26.20
A preview of Annoying Orange episodes for October 2013.
231	58	"Barewolf"	3:13	October 4, 2013	23.28
Nude Dude returns to trick-or-treat with Orange and the gang, with a secret that he is a werewolf, therefore he does not need a costume, but this ruins the gang's trick-or-treating experience when the moon's view is blocked off, reverting Nude Dude back to his naked self.
232	59	"Top 5 Ways to Survive a Zombie Apocalypse"	2:25	October 7, 2013	24.11
A list of 5 ways to survive a zombie apocalypse according to Orange.
233	60	"Dead and Berried"	3:48	October 11, 2013	25.18
Orange and Midget Apple are haunted by the ghost of Bill Cosberry from the trash bin.
234	61	"The Juice: Biggest Fear"	3:16	October 14, 2013	33.85
Orange and the gang discuss their biggest fears in this episode of the Juice.
235	62	"The Deviled Egg"	3:38	October 18, 2013	19.22
The satanic Deviled Egg appears in the kitchen and attempts to bargain for Orange's soul.
236	63	"FOODSPLOSION: Halloween Edition"	2:40	October 21, 2013	37.18
Orange hosts a special Halloween version of the game show Foodsplosion. This Episode's Guest: Country Pumpkin Prize: Chainsaw
237	64	"The Dining"	4:33	October 25, 2013	31.61
Orange and his friends are hired to watch over a deserted hotel just to regret it later when they start behaving weirder than usual, notably Orange.
238	65	"Horrorscope"	2:44	October 28, 2013	20.89
Several monsters seek for counseling with fortune teller Orange's crystal ball.
239	66	"Angry Orange"	3:53	November 1, 2013	42.13
Orange meets Angry Orange. Also debuting is Captain Obvious, an onion sea captain who always points out the obvious.
240	67	"Gut Wrenching"	4:16	November 8, 2013	37.11
Orange goes on a sailing trip with Pear and Captain Obvious, but things go awry when they are all swallowed whole by a whale.
241	68	"Ask Orange #9: Orange Is A Brony?"	3:20	November 15, 2013	26.18
Orange swears to never make an "Ask Orange" video again, as all they ever ask about is Marshmallow's gender. Pear convinces him to do so, and the episode begins. Orange is also revealed to be a brony, although he does not admit it explicitly.
242	69	"The Juice #3: Emo Knife"	3:58	November 18, 2013	21.74
In this episode of The Juice, the gang discuss about which one among the others they would like to be.
243	70	"Goat-Carts"	3:37	November 22, 2013	17.18
Orange, Midget Apple, Carrot, and Corn Dog race against each other in carts pulled by goats, called "goat-carts".
244	71a	"Black Hole Donut"	2:26	December 6, 2013	34.16
A powdered donut that generates black holes appears in the kitchen, and ejects various items from the black holes, leaving Orange and Pear in awe.
245	71b	"FOODSPLOSION #3: Pablo the Pepper"	4:14	December 6, 2013	28.18
Orange stars as the host of the game show Foodsplosion, where foods of all kinds ask a question and no matter if they are right and wrong, they win a prize, which ends up killing them. This Episode's Guest: Pablo the Pepper Prize: Golf Club
246	73	"The Juice #4: BatPan & Robinero"	2:46	December 9, 2013	24.41
In this episode of The Juice, the gang discusses which "supper-hero" (superheroes in the food world) that they would like to be.
247	74	"Icicle Insanity"	3:41	December 13, 2013	21.79
On a snowy day, Orange and friends warm up by the stove, until Icicle asks them to get inside to get warmer, unaware of the consequences.
248	75	"Coal For Christmas"	3:48	December 20, 2013	35.29
Orange, posing as Santa Claus, listens to the Christmas wishes of young foods until a piece of coal with high energy and a terrible attitude arrives, intending to headline the Naughty List.
249	76	"Infinity Snowball"	2:45	December 27, 2013	18.10
The gang is sledding together and when Orange attempts to go downhill with no sled, he accidentally slips and turns into a snowball that wrecks everything in its way.
250	77	"FOODSPLOSION #4: Pineapple Goes BATTY"	2:31	December 30, 2013	19.21
Orange stars as the host of the game show Foodsplosion, where foods of all kinds ask a question and no matter if they are right and wrong, they win a prize, which ends up killing them. This Episode's Guest: Spencer the Pineapple Prize: Baseball Bat

=== Season 6 (2014) ===
No. overall	No. in season	Title	Time	Original release date	Online viewers (in millions)
251	1	"2013 Kills Montage and Marshmallow Announcement"	3:03	January 3, 2014	16.87
This episode is a montage of all characters who died in 2013.
252	2	"How to Make the Annoying Orange"	2:57	January 10, 2014	21.61
Orange watches a man make a very weird and gross salad while a salad bowl watches in disgust. This is based on the "HowToBasic" videos on YouTube.
253	3	"Teenage Mutant Ninja Turnips"	4:31	January 17, 2014	22.51
The Teenage Mutant Ninja Turnips fight an evil block of cheese known as The Cheddar with their master Orange's advice of imagining their opponents in their underwear.
254	4	"Ask Orange #10: 2 MILLION KNIVES"	3:29	January 24, 2014	23.16
Orange answers even more fan questions, and narrowly avoids an attack by two million knives.
255	5	"Vine Compilation #1: Bacon Strips & Twerky Jerky"	1:39	January 29, 2014	18.48
This episode as compilation of several Vine clips, similar to the Random Cuts in Season 5.
256	6	"Directed By Michael Baygel"	4:43	January 31, 2014	24.15
Orange and Pear meet Michael Bay-gel, a famous director whose scenes threaten to destroy the kitchen, himself not caring about the ordeal.
257	7	"Emmett the Lovin' Mitt"	4:25	February 7, 2014	19.09
Orange meets Emmett the Oven Mitt, a woman attractor, who attempts to coach Orange on how to impress women, but things take a turn for the worse when it is revealed he cheats on women, as an angry mob of female foods and inanimate objects confront him.
258	8	"Fan Boy"	3:55	February 14, 2014	17.42
Orange meets an electric fan who claims to be his No. 1 admirer.
259	9	"Sacrifice Play"	3:47	February 21, 2014	18.06
Orange and his friends are put into trouble when a Romanesco tribe attempts to make food sacrifices to their angry god. This god however turns out to be just a haywire garbage disposal which, at the end, is fixed by Midget Apple (who tried to reason with the tribe throughout the entire episode).
260	10	"Sour Rangers"	4:29	February 28, 2014	21.62
The Sour Rangers (a parody of Sour Patch Kids and Mighty Morphin Power Rangers), try to defeat Marshmallow's evil puppy-destroying cousin, Marshageddon.
261	11	"Rage Sage"	4:43	March 7, 2014	20.91
Orange and Pear meet the heavy metal hall of famer "Rage Sage", who is persuaded by the two to make better music after they find out his new album is about unicorn kisses.
262	12	"Bad Apple"	3:37	March 14, 2014	25.21
At school, Orange and the gang meet Bad Apple, a new student whose bullying they try to thwart.
263	13	"2 BILLION VIEWS!"	2:51	March 21, 2014	19.15
Orange and the gang celebrate their 2 billionth view.
264	14	"Dumb as a Brick"	3:30	March 28, 2014	21.38
Orange, Pear, Grapefruit, and Captain Obvious meet Rick the Brick, whom is incredibly dumb.
265	15	"Crappy Captioned"	1:55	April 4, 2014	20.00
A remake of the first episode is made with the "terrible" Google automatic captions. This was inspired by Rhett & Link's "Caption Fail" videos.
266	16	"Puns of Anarchy"	3:35	April 11, 2014	29.14
Orange, Pear, and Midget Apple meet a gang of biker eggs called the Shell's Angels on Easter, but things get funny when the eggs' easter decorations are revealed.
267	17	"Tea'd Off"	4:38	April 18, 2014	27.14
Orange and Pear meet a cup of tea from England, whose way of speaking confuses Orange.
268	18	"Annoying Orange vs. Flappy Bird"	3:40	April 25, 2014	19.13
Orange appears in the game Flappy Bird and annoys the titular bird, cheating by using a hoverboard.
269	19	"Buddy Cops 3: Blue Detective"	4:52	May 2, 2014	18.11
Detective Midget Apple is partnerless because Marshmallow landed a talk show, so he needs to find a new one.
270	20	"Rump Roast"	4:08	May 9, 2014	22.15
While playing Monopoly, Pear and Midget Apple meet Rump Roast, and Orange's mind is blown by the hilarity of his name, which he constantly mocks.
271	21	"Double Rainbow Trout"	3:44	May 16, 2014	21.19
Orange meets a double rainbow trout named Gilly, who also happens to be a relative of Marshmallow.
272	22	"Rubik's Cube"	4:36	May 23, 2014	26.21
Orange meets and annoys all six faces of a Rubik's Cube,
273	23	"Ask Orange #11: Flappy Bird Returns"	4:19	May 30, 2014	16.31
Orange answers more of the fans' questions, and even has another run-in with Flappy Bird.
274	24	"Orange Coin"	4:25	June 6, 2014	23.08
The kitchen gang starts their own online currency called Orange Coin.
275	25	"Crappy Captioned #2"	3:46	June 13, 2014	17.92
A remake of "Grandpa Lemon" is made with the "terrible" Google automatic captions. Inspired by Rhett & Link's "Caption Fail" videos.
276	26	"Kriss Kut"	4:45	June 27, 2014	30.14
Orange, Pear, and Grapefruit meets the twin hip-hop artists, MC Kriss Kut and MC Kut Kriss, two waffle fries who wear their clothes backward.
277	27	"FOODSPLOSION #5: Coconut Ukelele"	2:35	June 30, 2014	26.02
Orange stars as the host of the game show Foodsplosion, where foods of all kinds ask a question and no matter if they are right and wrong, they win a prize, which ends up killing them. This Episode's Guest: Coconut Prize: Ukeleles and speaker
278	28	"Teenie Weenie"	5:52	July 4, 2014	19.25
Orange announces the kitchen's annual Hot Dog Eating Contest, and two hot dogs, Frank and Link, attempt to defeat the champion of Hot Dog Eating, The Great One, a diminutive frankfurter who has never lost a competition.
279	29	"TMI Podcast"	5:03	July 11, 2014	29.15
Marc Marinara, host of the TMI Podcast, interviews Orange.
280	30	"Feel the Burn"	5:05	July 18, 2014	18.71
Orange, Pear, and Midget Apple are pushed around by Vitabuff, a short-tempered, physically fit bottle of protein powder who constantly pressures them all to get into shape and exercise.
281	31	"Briquet"	3:59	July 25, 2014	25.18
Orange meets a charcoal briquet and annoys him with nonsensical words.
282	32	"Ask Orange #12: Break Dance Lessons"	4:34	August 1, 2014	27.17
Ask Orange returns with more questions answered by Orange, including a question asking if he can breakdance, to which he replies that he is learning how to do so from Copper Lincoln.
283	33	"Mini Shark"	5:13	August 8, 2014	18.55
Orange and Pear meet Dr. Shark, an incredibly small shark who plans to make Shark Week year-round by using a laser that can transform anything into a shark.
284	34	"Limes"	3:58	August 15, 2014	19.60
Orange meets a lime (voiced by Brad Paisley) who sings a song about the difficulty of a lime's life.
285	35	"Cruel Middle School"	4:52	August 22, 2014	17.80
Orange and the gang revisit their middle school misadventures, although Pear is saddened when the others learn about his former girlfriend, Liz Lizard, who moved to Michigan before the Spring Fling dance, and Pear never got to say goodbye.
286	36	"Ice Bucket Challenge"	2:52	August 29, 2014	19.40
Orange does the Ice Bucket Challenge on his friends, rather than himself.
287	37	"Totally Dental"	4:55	September 5, 2014	21.17
Orange is given a visit from the dentist Dr. Toothpaste, who whitens his teeth so much that it blinds Pear and Midget Apple, and attracts an alien spaceship.
288	38	"Control Freak"	3:55	September 12, 2014	30.00
Orange, Pear, and Midget Apple meet a universal remote that can pause and rewind real life, and Pear and Midget Apple use the remote to their advantage when Orange is knifed and juiced.
289	39	"Seinfood"	6:44	September 19, 2014	16.04
The gang parodies Seinfeld with Pear as Jerry, Midget Apple as George, Passion as Elaine, Orange as Kramer, and Grapefruit as Newman.
290	40	"Annoying Sister"	4:54	September 26, 2014	19.18
Orange's sister comes for a visit and she and Orange annoy a can of beans.
291	41	"Crappy Captioned #3"	2:42	October 3, 2014	22.24
A remake of "Plumpkin" with the "terrible" Google automatic captions.
292	42	"Happy 5th Birthday!"	5:44	October 9, 2014	19.95
Annoying Orange celebrates his fifth birthday and gets thanks from various YouTube celebrities who guest starred on the show, as well as various people involved with the TV show.
293	43	"Haunted Leaf Pile"	4:40	October 10, 2014	30.14
Despite Pear's objections, Orange and Midget Apple jump into a dangerous pile of leaves filled with slugs that possess them, leaving them to constantly jump into leaf piles.
294	44	"Headless Horseplay"	4:17	October 17, 2014	28.16
Orange gets into another scary moment when he meets the Headless Horseman. However, Orange gets picked up by the Horseman rather than his usual jack-o-lantern, which results in him annoying people rather than frightening them.
295	45	"Gourdzilla"	6:22	October 24, 2014	15.53
Parody of the thriller Godzilla. The citizens are scared after a giant gourd awakens and wreaks havoc on the Thousand Islands, and it is up to Dr. Sea Star to stop the beast.
296	46	"Deadline At Daneco!"	7:19	October 31, 2014	15.10
Orange wraps up his 2014 Shocktober videos with Orange dreaming of the employees at Daneco trying to finish a video before their deadline, and end up murdered.
297	47	"Turducken"	4:16	November 7, 2014	22.74
Orange meets a turkey, a duck and a chicken who get stuffed inside each other to make a turducken. Orange then stuffs other things into Turducken, such as an ice cream cone and a chili pepper, and even himself.
298	48	"Ask Orange #13: Pear Hates Babies?"	3:50	November 14, 2014	18.48
Orange answers more fan questions, even learning via mind-reading that Pear hates babies.
299	49	"Too Many Fruits"	3:54	November 21, 2014	20.11
A sitcom intro spoofing Too Many Cooks, featuring many fruits and non-fruits, some who have starred in the series, some who have not.
300	50	"Fruitcake"	4:27	December 5, 2014	21.67
Orange meets a fruitcake who is completely mentally insane.
301	51	"Fruit Wars: The Fart Awakens Teaser Trailer"	1:23	December 10, 2014	27.21
A parody trailer of Star Wars: The Force Awakens, starring the AO cast.
302	52	"Missile Toe"	2:49	December 12, 2014	30.19
Orange sings a song about a rocket-propelled toe that brings Christmas cheer.
303	53	"White Elephant"	3:44	December 19, 2014	25.16
The kitchen holds a White Elephant Gift Exchange, and everyone but a migraine-struck Pear gets a kazoo as a gift. Pear's present, much to his dismay, is an actual white elephant given to him by Midget Apple, who misunderstood the words "white elephant".
304	54	"Orange Alone"	6:47	December 26, 2014	19.62
When the other fruits leave to spend Christmas with Nerville, Orange is accidentally left alone in the kitchen and must defend it against Grapefruit and his partner-in-crime Watermelon, who plan to rob it. This episode is a parody of the 1990 Christmas movie, Home Alone.

=== Season 7 (2015) ===
No. overall	No. in season	Title	Time	Original release date	Online viewers (in millions)
305	1	"2014 Kills Montage!!!"	3:38	January 2, 2015	18.21
A montage of all the characters who died in 2014.
306	2	"Annoying Orange vs. Oregon Trail"	3:50	January 9, 2015	19.15
Orange takes the role of the player in the video game The Oregon Trail.
307	3	"Sour Rangers 2"	4:15	January 16, 2015	17.19
The Sour Rangers return to fight the evil Lord Bread by combining their Megagourd with Grapefruit, who has just opened a juice bar.
308	4	"Judge Waffle!"	4:10	January 23, 2015	15.19
In this case of the courtroom of Judge Walter W. Waffle, Blueberry Pancake sues Squash for squashing him, but Squash's defense is that the one who squashed him was a "one-armed man".
309	5	"Ground Beef Day"	4:10	January 30, 2015	16.18
In a parody of the movie Groundhog Day, Orange keeps telling bad jokes on Ground Beef Day and begins reliving the same day over and over.
310	6	"Valentine's Candy Crush"	5:09	February 6, 2015	20.66
Orange finds out Midget Apple is dating his sister. Midget Apple tells Orange's sister he ordered her candy hearts, but they say mean messages, as they fell off the delivery truck into a lake.
311	7	"Love Tri-Mangle"	4:17	February 13, 2015	14.41
Orange witnesses a confrontation between Samantha, a chunk of pineapple, her boyfriend Rod, a chunk of bell pepper, and her ex-boyfriend Brian, a chunk of sirloin, who end up getting skewered together.
312	8	"Marshmallow's Missing"	4:46	February 20, 2015	19.82
Milk Detective visits the kitchen and lists Orange and the gang as primary suspects in the sudden disappearance of Marshmallow, who was really riding over a rainbow with his mother.
313	9	"Ask Orange #14: Toad Talk!"	3:46	February 27, 2015	18.08
Orange answers more questions submitted by the fans, including the revelation that Midget Apple can make a toad voice.
314	10	"Symphony Number Ate"	3:44	March 6, 2015	19.91
Johann Sebastian Bok Choy presents his composition Symphony Number Ate, featuring the musical talent of Orange and friends.
315	11	"FOODSPLOSION #6"	3:00	March 13, 2015	13.82
Orange stars as the host of the game show Foodsplosion, where foods of all kinds ask a question and no matter if they are right and wrong, they win a prize, which ends up killing them. This Episode's Guest: Tammy the Tomato Prize: Blender There is a 360 version of this video on YouTube.
316	12	"Killer Schedule"	4:02	March 20, 2015	16.79
Orange meets multiple new foods but runs out of jokes to use on them.
317	13	"Chicken Leg'd"	4:32	March 27, 2015	12.67
Orange and friends appear on a prank show run by a chicken leg, who eventually challenges Orange to a dare-off.
318	14	"Jurassic Pork"	5:34	April 3, 2015	13.13
Dr. Bananas returns with a new invention, a theme park filled with dinosaur-pig hybrids.
319	15	"Incognito Burrito"	3:55	April 10, 2015	15.79
Agent Burrito, a terrible CIA agent, is tasked to confiscate Orange's vuvuzela before he can discover the proper way to use it and annoy others.
320	16	"Crappy Captioned #4: More Annoying Orange"	2:58	April 17, 2015	21.94
A remake of "More Annoying Orange" is made with the "terrible" Google automatic captions. This was inspired by Rhett & Link's "Caption Fail" videos.
321	17	"Ask Orange #15: Farts are Funny!"	4:17	April 24, 2015	17.85
Orange answers more questions submitted by the fans, also dedicating this particular episode to farts.
322	18	"Microscopic Apple"	4:35	May 1, 2015	13.13
At a police lineup, Midget Apple tries to get an apple that is even smaller than him to confess to stealing a tomato's purse by hurting his feelings with jokes that offend short people.
323	19	"Top 5 Ways to Make MONEY!!"	3:39	May 8, 2015	18.67
Orange lists the Top 5 Ways to Make Money.
324	20	"A Day in the Life of Toilet Paper"	0:57	May 11, 2015	15.52
A day in the average life of toilet paper is shown, as Carl the roll of toilet paper witnesses in horror the sight of his friend being used to wipe fecal matter and being flushed down the toilet.
325	21	"The Eggspendables!"	4:08	May 15, 2015	20.74
Orange and the gang meet the Eggspendables, a team of heroic eggs who are tasked to stop a coconut from assisting his boss in dominating the world.
326	22	"NASCAR Pit Crew"	3:26	May 22, 2015	13.97
Orange and the gang work as a NASCAR Pit Crew for Fryin Scott, with Pear as pit chief.
327	23	"The Obnoxious Kumquat"	3:47	May 29, 2015	19.90
Orange and the gang meet their new neighbors, so different, yet so the same – they are a literature-loving bartlett pear, a fun-filled sugar cube, a female ruby red grapefruit, and of course, a jokester kumquat
328	24	"EAT 3 Conference!"	3:54	June 5, 2015	19.78
Orange and the gang visit the Eat 3 Conference (parody of E3), where Dr. Bananas is showcasing his new driverless car.
329	25	"Shia LaBeouf Motivates the Kitchen"	3:00	June 12, 2015	16.18
Shia LaBeouf motivates the kitchen with his "Just Do It" speech.
330	26	"Ask Orange #16: Screaming Rainbow"	4:39	June 19, 2015	17.22
Orange answers more questions submitted by the fans, including a theme song for a screaming rainbow.
331	27	"T-Boned"	3:48	June 26, 2015	13.67
Orange meets a T-Bone steak, one of the toughest foods in the kitchen.
332	28	"Crappy Captioned #5: Toe-May-Toe"	2:43	July 3, 2015	22.58
A remake of "Toe-May-Toe" is made with the "terrible" Google automatic captions. This was inspired by Rhett & Link's "Caption Fail" videos.
333	29	"Painting Pals with Bob Moss"	3:17	July 10, 2015	19.19
Orange paints landscapes with Bob Moss in a parody of The Joy of Painting.
334	30	"Studmuffin"	3:55	July 17, 2015	13.83
Grapefruit challenges a muffin who is just as tough as he is to a stud-off to win over some female foods.
335	31	"Cookie-DOH!"	3:48	July 24, 2015	16.52
Orange, Pear, and Midget Apple meet a lump of cookie dough who actually wants to become a cookie, a big one to be precise. However, she becomes a tiny cookie as she was nibbled from as dough.
336	32	"Lawyer Up"	4:55	July 31, 2015	14.18
Orange hires a 3 layer dip to be his lawyer against potato lawyer Franklin L. Spud, who is defending a zucchini whom Orange called a "cucumber".
337	33	"Crappy Captioned #6: Monster Burger!"	3:18	August 7, 2015	13.03
A remake of "Monster Burger!" is made with the "terrible" Google automatic captions. This was inspired by Rhett & Link's "Caption Fail" videos.
338	34	"Magnet Madness!"	5:03	August 14, 2015	21.82
Orange witnesses a letter U magnet to stand up to a mean, bragging letter A magnet on the fridge.
339	35	"Watch Me (Whip/Nya Nya) – Silento Watch Me (Whip/Nae Nae) Spoof"	3:04	August 21, 2015	12.81
Orange sings a parody of Silentó's Watch Me (Whip/Nae Nae).
340	36	"Gaming Grape"	4:18	August 28, 2015	15.19
Orange and the gang meet a grape who is forced by his mother to get some fresh air rather than play video games. When his bragging older brother, famous athlete Game Ball, arrives with his friend Soccer Ball to pick on him, Gaming Grape accepts a challenge to face his brother in a virtual football match, where he, unsurprisingly, defeats his older brother. Guest stars: Shannon Jones as Gaming Grape, Brock Baker as Game Ball, and Kevin Brueck as Soccer Ball
341	37	"How Annoying Orange should have ended"	0:40	September 1, 2015	12.23
The first Annoying Orange video is edited with a new ending. The video ends with a short video featuring John Cena.
342	38	"Fart Step"	4:38	September 4, 2015	19.84
After Skrillet's invention of "dumbstep" music fades into obscurity, Orange and the gang take a shot at a revival of his revolutionary creation. However, things get out of hand when Skrillet himself shows up to take credit for their creation, with lawyer Franklin L. Spud by his side.
343	39	"The Whisper Challenge"	3:58	September 9, 2015	13.95
Orange and Pear do the Whisper Challenge, where one reads a phrase to another, who is wearing headphones blasting loud music, and tries to read the other's lips.
344	40	"Ask Orange 17: See My Butt?!?!"	4:34	September 11, 2015	17.23
Orange answers more questions submitted by the fans, including Orange trying to get a view of his rear end.
345	41	"Sailor Spoon"	5:52	September 18, 2015	20.73
In a parody of Sailor Moon, Marshmallow, Sailor Spoon, and the Silver Scouts must stop the evil Queen NyQuil from turning the inhabitants of the kitchen into her zombie minions. Guest stars: Strawburry17 as Sailor Spoon, Kate Wilson as Sailor Sporkury and Sailor Scoopiter, Jess Lizama as Queen NyQuil, and Greg Benson as Meatball
346	42	"Wild Rice"	3:16	September 25, 2015	16.21
Orange and the gang meet a primitive grain of rice whose customs they do not understand, along with Professor Q. Puddington, who is observing his primal behavior.
347	43	"The Eclair Witch Project"	4:42	October 2, 2015	13.09
In a spoof of The Blair Witch Project, Orange, Midget Apple and Grapefruit disappear into the woods surrounding the kitchen while shooting a documentary. The footage of the event is shown.
348	44	"Afraid of the Dark!"	3:32	October 9, 2015	19.41
Orange, Pear, Midget Apple, Grapefruit, and Dr. Bananas experience a power outage.
349	45	"Annoying Orange Supercut – EVERY VIDEO EVER!"	16:08:02	October 10, 2015	23.18
A 16-hour supercut featuring every episode from October 9, 2009, to September 25, 2015. Note: A few episodes, such as "Fry-Day", are absent.
350	46	"Fish Barfception"	3:14	October 16, 2015	18.85
Orange experiences several surreal dreams, the majority of which involve him and his friends vomiting up whole fish.
351	47	"The Flexorcist"	6:29	October 23, 2015	12.00
Grapefruit is hired to exorcise Tommy Tomato in a parody of The Exorcist.
352	48	"Lou the Tick's Top 5 Things to be Irrationally Afraid Of!"	4:10	October 30, 2015	18.31
Lou the Tick lists the Top 5 Things to be Irrationally Afraid Of. Guest star: Michael Wingate as Lou the Tick
353	49	"Ask Orange #18: Knife Drill!"	4:02	November 6, 2015	13.32
Orange answers more questions submitted by the fans, and in addition, narrowly dodge an attack by multiple knives and drills.
354	50	"String Cheese Incident (ft. Wilson Cleveland)"	3:49	November 13, 2015	12.04
Orange and the gang meet a hyperactive stick of string cheese who likes to think positive. Guest star: Wilson Cleveland as string cheese
355	51	"Saved By the Bell Pepper"	4:48	November 20, 2015	19.03
In a parody of Saved by the Bell, Orange (Zack) attempts to get Kelly KaPassion to go to a dance with him. Guest stars: Bobjenz as Grapefruit, iJustine as Passion Fruit/Kelly KaPassion, and Kevin Brueck as Principal Bell Pepper
356	52	"Black Friday: Day 1"	2:27	November 23, 2015	11.73
Orange and the gang wait in line for a store opening for Black Friday.
357	53	"Black Friday: Day 2 – Ask Orange"	2:05	November 24, 2015	11.74
Orange and the gang continue waiting in line for a store opening for Black Friday.
358	54	"Black Friday: Day 3 – Metal Mania!"	3:07	November 25, 2015	11.75
Orange and the gang continue waiting in line for a store opening for Black Friday.
359	55	"Black Friday: Day 4 – Happy Thanksgiving!"	1:51	November 26, 2015	11.79
Orange and the gang continue waiting in line for a store opening for Black Friday.
360	56	"Black Friday: Day 5 – End Of The Line!"	3:13	November 27, 2015	11.92
Orange and the gang make it to the end of the line for a store opening for Black Friday.
361	57	"Five Night at Freddy Fruitbear's (FNAF Spoof)"	3:26	November 30, 2015	14.17
Orange spoofs Five Nights at Freddy's as he takes the role of Freddy Fruitbear.
362	58	"Ask Orange #19: Christmas T-N-Tree!"	4:35	December 4, 2015	19.38
Orange answers more questions submitted by the fans in a special Christmas edition of Ask Orange.
363	59	"Frosty the Snowcone"	2:37	December 11, 2015	15.83
When the news breaks out about the serial killer Frosty the Snowcone escaping from prison, Orange sings the story behind his murderous actions to the tune of "Frosty the Snowman".
364	60	"Silent Knife (Silent Night Parody)"	2:12	December 18, 2015	15.11
Orange, Pear, Midget Apple, Marshmallow, and Squash sing a parody of Silent Night as many foods are killed by Knife.
365	61	"Operation Steal Santa's Presents"	4:44	December 25, 2015	12.58
Orange and the gang go on a stealth mission to steal Santa Bearclaw's presents. Guest stars: John David as Santa Bearclaw and iwantmylauren as Rudolph the Gingerbread Reindeer

=== Season 8 (2016) ===
No. overall	No. in season	Title	Time	Original release date	Online viewers (in millions)
366	1	"2015 Kills Montage!!!"	3:16	January 1, 2016	13.00
All the characters killed in 2015 are seen in a montage.
367	2	"Honeydew and Honeydon't! (ft. Wilson Cleveland)"	4:30	January 8, 2016	16.07
Orange meets two honeydew etiquette coaches: Honeydew, who demonstrates good behavior, and Honeydon't, who demonstrates bad behavior. However, Orange is demonstrating the worst behavior possible, and the two attempt to give Orange an etiquette lesson. Guest star: Wilson Cleveland as Honeydew and Joe Nation as Honeydon't
368	3	"Donald Trunk (Trump Spoof)"	4:48	January 15, 2016	12.73
For the next kitchen presidential election, a bread trunk named Donald Trunk arrives to run for the Orange Party. He begins sharing his "great ideas" with Orange and the gang, and is later confronted by his opponents, Hillary Minton and Bernie Sandwich.
369	4	"Blizzard of OZ (Wizard of OZ parody)"	4:18	January 22, 2016	19.12
Orange wakes up from a dream in which he and his friends (as characters from The Wizard of Oz) go to see a being known as the Blizzard of Oz to defeat the evil Ice Witch. Guest star: Bobjenz as Grapefruit/The Cowardly Grapefruit
370	5	"Red Shirt Special"	4:26	January 29, 2016	9.12
When Orange is as bored as he can be, he opens up a barrel of rejected AO characters to annoy.
371	6	"Skydiving!"	5:21	February 5, 2016	1.89
Orange annoys his skydiving instructor, a tomato named Greg, while going skydiving with Pear, Midget Apple, and Grapefruit. Guest star: Joe Nation as Greg
372	7	"Return of Passion!"	4:26	February 12, 2016	15.05
Passion returns after a long absence, and Orange believes the reason is that she is a secret agent. Guest stars: iJustine as Passion Fruit and Bobjenz as Grapefruit
373	8	"Ask Orange #20: DELETING YOUTUBE!!!"	4:20	February 19, 2016	13.82
Orange answers more questions submitted by fans, including a threat to delete YouTube if Marshmallow's gender is not revealed.
374	9	"Mystic 8-Ball"	4:42	February 26, 2016	16.56
Orange meets a robot disguised as a Mystic 8-Ball.
375	10	"Spam Mail"	4:16	March 4, 2016	14.37
Orange accepts spam mail on Pear's computer sent from cans of Spam.
376	11	"Fart Club! (ft. Wilson Cleveland)"	4:40	March 11, 2016	16.27
Orange joins the Fart Club, a club run by a can of beans that is entirely dedicated to farting. Guest stars: Wilson Cleveland as Broccoli and Greg Benson as Beans
377	12	"Apple Keynote Address"	4:30	March 18, 2016	8.53
The CEO of Apple, Apple, alongside Orange, Marshmallow, and Grapefruit, present the newest unveilings of future products at their keynote address, despite Pear's objections.
378	13	"Butt Wipe!"	3:31	March 25, 2016	17.77
Orange goes behind the scenes to edit the latest video (which ironically, is this one) alongside the lead AO video editor Baguedditor.
379	14	"Marshmallow's Gender Revealed!!! (5 MILLION Subscriber Special)"	4:50	April 1, 2016	9.03
Orange and the gang celebrate their achievement of 5,000,000 subscribers by revealing Marshmallow's gender. However, various distractions occur that prevent Marshmallow's gender being publicly announced, as this was an April Fools prank.
380	15	"Ask Orange #21: THE FART AWAKENS!"	5:12	April 8, 2016	13.59
Orange answers more questions submitted by fans, including a Star Wars parody.
381	16	"Fruits Convince Little Apple of Zombie Apocalypse (Brothers Convince Sister SPOOF)"	4:14	April 15, 2016	6.28
In a spoof of the Brothers Convince Sister viral video, Orange and the gang trick Midget Apple into thinking that they are in the midst of a zombie apocalypse. Guest star: Bobjenz as Grapefruit
382	17	"Robot Power!"	2:57	April 22, 2016	7.99
Orange builds a robot out of Pear's possessions, and sings a song as it works, but when water gets into the robot's circuitry, it begins destroying the kitchen.
383	18	"Crop Circle Conspiracy!"	4:47	April 29, 2016	10.02
Orange and his friends are told conspiracy theories about crop circles by Lou the Tick, a corn cob, and a cracked pot, and are convinced that they are real. Guest star: Michael Wingate as Lou The Tick
384	19	"Kitchen Improvement"	4:53	May 6, 2016	16.66
Orange, Pear, and Midget Apple star in a reality show about remodeling kitchens.
385	20	"Bacon"	4:19	May 13, 2016	15.45
In a parody of the movie Taken, a former CIA agent bacon strip gives permission to his daughter, Baby Egg, to go somewhere with her friends, but takes action when Baby Egg tells him over the phone that she is being taken by sausages, who are killed in the bacon father's attempt to "rescue" his daughter, when the sausages were only taking Baby Egg and her fellow students on a school field trip. Guest star: Jess Lizama as Baby Egg
386	21	"Dragon Fruit Z"	6:02	May 20, 2016	14.71
In a parody of Dragon Ball Z, Smarty Pants goes on a quest to find the identity of the legendary Super-Citrus, which is Orange. However, trouble ensues when Radish and Broccoli show up to steal the sacred Dragon Orb and make a wish of evil. Luckily, Gokarrot and Pickleo arrive and attempt to stop them in a fierce, long battle, in which Broccoli is destroyed. But when the two are defeated by Radish, its up to Super-Citrus Orange to save the day. Guest stars: iwantmylauren as Smarty Pants and Bobjenz as Grapefruit and Radish
387	22	"30 Minutes or Less"	4:47	May 27, 2016	8.34
Grapefruit tricks newbie pizza-delivery boy Pepe Pepperoni with fake addresses to get free pizza via the kitchen pizzeria's "30 Minutes Or It's Free" policy. Luckily, Pepe's boss, Chicago Style Pizza, arrives to return the favor to Grapefruit and his friends. Guest stars: Shannon Jones as Pepe, Kevin Brueck as Chicago Style Pizza, and Bobjenz as Grapefruit
388	23	"Annoying Orange vs Sub Zero (Mortal Kombat)"	2:41	June 3, 2016	18.26
Orange takes on Sub-Zero in Mortal Kombat.
389	24	"NASCAR Pit Crew Part Deux!"	5:06	June 10, 2016	15.43
Orange and the gang return as a NASCAR Pit Crew for Bran Muffin Jones, and Pear returns as pit chief. Guest stars: Brandon Jones as Bran Muffin Jones and Brendan Gaughan as Omelet Gaughan
390	25	"Ask Orange #22: MARSHMALLOW'S GENDER DETECTOR!"	5:54	June 17, 2016	11.65
Orange answers more questions from fans, and attempts to discover Marshmallow's gender with a smartphone app called the Gender Detector.
391	26	"Lick a Toad!"	4:22	June 24, 2016	16.32
Orange and friends lick a frog, thinking they'll experience psychedelic hallucinations.
392	27	"The Amazing Wonderbread!"	4:53	July 1, 2016	13.50
Orange upstages The Amazing Wonderbread, the famed magician, at one of his live performances. Guest stars: Kevin Brueck as The Amazing Wonderbread and Bobjenz as Grapefruit
393	28	"Boyz N Berry!"	4:48	July 8, 2016	18.56
Orange and his sister go to a concert for the boy band Boyz N Berry, and things get out of hand when the former lead singer, Berry, arrives in the middle of the concert, and attempts to rejoin his own band after he was kicked out for being over-conceited. Guest star: Jess Lizama as Orange's Sister
394	29	"Annoying Orange vs Ms. Pac-Man"	4:06	July 15, 2016	14.42
Orange replaces Clyde in the game Ms. Pac-Man and annoys Ms. Pac-Man. Guest stars: Jess Lizama as Ms. Pac-Man & Kim Evey as Pinky
395	30	"Ask Orange #23: TNT BUTT"	5:40	July 22, 2016	15.72
Orange answers more fan questions, even revealing that there is a large amount of TNT hidden in his butt.
396	31	"Slippery Soap"	3:57	July 29, 2016	16.87
Orange and his sister encounter a shady bar of soap who plans to open a bar. Guest star: Jess Lizama as Orange's Sister
397	32	"FROYOLO!"	3:07	August 5, 2016	9.55
Orange and friends begin yelling strange phrases for fun, alongside a cup of frozen yogurt.
398	33	"Allergic to Peanuts"	4:10	August 12, 2016	10.10
Orange meets a peanut who pretty much cannot do anything fun because of his overprotective mother. Guest star: Shannon Jones as Peanut
399	34	"Drone Race"	3:28	August 19, 2016	10.12
Orange races Pear and Midget Apple's Quadcopters with his propeller beanie.
400	35	"Ask Orange #24: Orange & Pear Have a Baby!"	5:50	August 26, 2016	8.62
Orange answers more questions from fans, even having a baby with Pear.
401	36	"Wiggle Jiggle!"	2:20	September 2, 2016	7.45
Orange sings about the latest dance phenomenon, the Wiggle Jiggle!
402	37	"Operation Jumbo Drop"	3:27	September 9, 2016	10.05
Orange witnesses the Jumbo Drop, where eggs are placed in objects that are intended to protect them from a fall from a roof.
403	38	"Land Beyond the Kitchen"	5:35	September 16, 2016	11.11
Orange, Pear, and Midget Apple travel by train to the fabled Land Beyond the Kitchen, which is under attack from the fierce Dragon Fruit.
404	39	"Ask Orange #25: Rabid Squirrel Attack"	4:32	September 23, 2016	9.39
Orange answers more questions from fans, and endures an attack by a horde of rabid squirrels.
405	40	"ASMR"	4:09	September 30, 2016	12.58
A pineapple teaches Orange how to calm himself with ASMR. Guest stars: Rebecca Parham as Pineapple
406	41	"Sandwitch!"	5:11	October 7, 2016	8.99
The wicked Sandwitch appears and casts spells on Orange and everyone in the kitchen. Guest stars: Jess Lizama as Sandwitch
407	42	"Ghoulash"	5:03	October 14, 2016	10.91
A tale is told about a monstrous goulash growing in size over five days and absorbs the friends of a piece of mystery meat over time. Mystery Meat then makes it his mission to destroy the Ghoulash once and for all.
408	43	"Scream For Ice Cream"	5:13	October 21, 2016	10.16
A demonic ice cream cone possesses Orange when he enters the freezer after he hears noises inside. Orange then attempts to convince Pear, Grapefruit, Marshmallow and Midget Apple to go into the freezer – despite Midget Apple and Pear's objections, Marshmallow and Grapefruit are eventually convinced, enter the freezer, and are also possessed, later followed by Midget Apple.
409	44	"Ask Orange #26: Pear-y Potter!"	6:05	October 28, 2016	15.34
Orange wraps up the episodes of Shocktober 2016 by answering some Halloween-themed questions from fans, as well as Pear briefly becoming a Harry Potter-style wizard.
410	45	"Astronaut Ice Cream!"	3:53	November 4, 2016	10.19
Astronaut Ice Cream visits the kitchen in search of intelligent Earthlings, only to be annoyed by Orange, who claims he is the most intelligent.
411	46	"Man-Bat!"	4:45	November 11, 2016	12.10
The so-called superhero Man-Bat appears and explains his past to Orange, Pear and Midget Apple of how his parents were killed by a human with a broomstick, only to be soon recruited by Commissioner Gourdon to save the kitchen from his arch-enemies, Mr. Febreeze, The Penguini, and the Poker, all wielding brooms – the weapon Man-Bat's parents were killed with. At this, Man-Bat becomes so scared, he runs into a nearby port-a-potty to defecate, leaving the three villains to attack the kitchen.
412	47	"Gobble! Gobble!"	3:58	November 18, 2016	20.20
During Thanksgiving, Orange makes jokes with a turkey while a cautious cranberry tries to prevent them or else he and the turkey will be served as dinner. Unfortunately, they do not listen.
413	48	"Ask Orange #27: Death Star Butt!"	4:24	November 25, 2016	15.78
Orange answers even more questions submitted from fans, even Grapefruit revealing himself as the first Death Star with a laser on his posterior.
414	49	"Elf on the Shelf!"	4:10	December 2, 2016	8.63
The Elf on the Shelf appears and tells Orange, Pear, Midget Apple and Grapefruit about how he monitors the behavior of the fruits during December and reports it back to Santa, much to the paranoia of Lou the Tick, who says they are under surveillance.
415	50	"It's a Wonderful Knife!"	3:54	December 9, 2016	19.66
During the holiday season, whenever a bell rings, an angel food cake is knifed; much to Pear's dismay, people keep ringing bells during Christmas time and the concerned fruit attempts in failure to stop the bells.
416	51	"Ask Orange #28: Christmas GOOP!"	5:39	December 16, 2016	10.00
Orange answers more Christmas-themed questions from fans, as well as making up a song called Christmas Goop, which explains the tradition of people receiving slimy goo on Christmas.
417	52	"Snow Cannon!"	3:39	December 23, 2016	9.40
After hearing everyone complain about the lack of snow, Orange decides to build a snow cannon, but because he does not understand the actual definitions of the minor parts, he ends up building an actual cannon. However, after he fixes it into a snow cannon, he reverses it and decimates several parts of the kitchen.
418	53	"2016 KILLS Video"	3:30	December 30, 2016	TBA
All of the characters that died in 2016 are seen in a montage.

=== Season 9 (2017) ===
No. overall	No. in season	Title	Time	Original release date	Online viewers (in million)
419	1	"Knifenado! (Sharknado Parody)"	4:25	January 6, 2017	5.12
In the style of Sharknado, a tornado destroys a knife factory and collects countless knives, turning it into a knifenado. Orange, Pear, Midget Apple and Grapefruit are engulfed in it after the former forgot to build a tornado cellar. As well as the fruits, the knifenado wrecks the squash, TNT and orange factories and kills many fruits and vegetables.
420	2	"Hot Potato"	4:47	January 13, 2017	5.52
The famous celebrity Hot Potato and her personal photographer Richard come to the kitchen for the former's most important photo shoot of her career. Much to her annoyance, however, Orange ruins all of her lingerie by using it as a handkerchief. Fortunately, Grapefruit intervenes by giving an old shirt to Hot Potato, but Orange just wants the celebrity to look ridiculous.
421	3	"Disasterpiece!"	4:09	January 20, 2017	5.42
After failing to do an extreme skateboard stunt down a staircase, Orange inadvertently destroys a statue sculpted by famous bread artist Michelangel-Dough. However, the artist is amazed how Orange becomes a work of art, and things get even more artistic when Dough's friends, Pablo Espresso, Lenonardo Da Minced Meat, Candy Warhol and Piggy Banksy appear to create works of art of Orange.
422	4	"WWEat!"	4:59	January 27, 2017	6.03
Orange, Pear, and Midget Apple compete in a tag team WWEat match against Celerey Mysterio, The Big Fig Show, and Flan Cena.
423	5	"TOP 10 Numbers That'll Blow Your Mind!"	4:19	February 3, 2017	5.09
Orange counts down the top 10 most mind-blowing numbers, even those that do not exist or make sense.
424	6	"Forbidden Love"	3:14	February 10, 2017	4.12
Various foods and objects fall in love on Valentine's Day, even if when together they cause something bad to happen, as pointed out by a horribly concerned Pear.
425	7	"1000 Degree Knife!"	3:09	February 17, 2017	6.21
Despite its thermostat turned down to cold temperatures, the kitchen faces extreme heat-filled danger when a knife is heated to 1000 degrees by five blowtorches.
426	8	"Adeli Meat – Jello (Hello Parody)"	3:38	February 24, 2017	5.81
At the funeral of Jello, the deceased dessert's closest friend, Adeli Meat (a spoof of Adele), performs the song "Jello" to honor him, while also berating an expired carton of milk that took Jello's place in the fridge after his death. Guest Star: Rebecca Parham as Adeli Meat
427	9	"Ask Orange #29: Kiss Passion!"	5:30	March 3, 2017	5.18
Orange answers even more questions from fans, and almost ultimately declares his love for Passion Fruit, but his anxiety gets in the way.
428	10	"Kitchenmon GO!"	4:12	March 10, 2017	6.01
Almost everyone in the kitchen is obsessed with the new game Kitchenmon GO (a spoof of Pokémon GO), and it causes serious trouble, with unwary players in the kitchen falling off the counter looking for Kitchenmon to catch, and crashing their cars while playing the game. Pear notices and tries unsuccessfully to warn the foods who are playing the game of inevitable danger.
429	11	"Snack to the Future"	5:03	March 17, 2017	6.10
In a spoof of Back to the Future, Orange travels 30 years back in time using Dr. Bananas' DeLorean-style time-traveling car, and must figure out how to get back to his time, while also encountering several of his friends and acquaintances along the way, who all do not recognize him.
430	12	"Hey Now You're an Apple! (All Star Parody)"	3:23	March 24, 2017	5.51
Orange sings a parody of Smash Mouth's All Star, while mocking various apples in the kitchen, who get knifed during the song.
431	13	"Pokémon Orange!"	3:48	March 31, 2017	5.78
Orange annoys Pokémon Trainer Red in the game Pokémon Orange Version then battles and catches him with a Poké Ball as if he were a Pokémon. He then proceeds to do so with other Pokémon Trainers.
432	14	"Ask Orange #30: Super Annoying Orange!"	5:35	April 7, 2017	3.11
Orange answers even more questions from fans, including a movie trailer of him as Super Annoying Orange.
433	15	"The Great Caper"	4:47	April 14, 2017	5.15
Orange meets and annoys the notorious Potato Caper, who is trying to attack and rob the Gravy Train and thinks Orange could be a useful and worthy accomplice because of his kazoo skills.
434	16	"Foreign Exchange Foodent"	4:03	April 21, 2017	6.06
Orange, his sister, Pear, Passion Fruit, Midget Apple, Grapefruit and a strawberry meet a Swedish Fish named Sven, a foreign exchange foodent, and the boys presume that learning accents could help them woo girls, but it does not work (Orange tries Russian, Midget Apple tries French, Grapefruit tries Canadian and Pear tries an abysmal Australian accent.)
435	17	"Skinny Dipping"	4:35	April 28, 2017	6.08
Nude Dude convinces Orange, Grapefruit, Midget Apple, a grape and a potato to do skinny dipping in the kitchen sink. Pear, however, refuses to be indecent, and believes Nude Dude is a negative influence; he joins the gang, only to be mocked at for wearing swimming shorts. Fortunately, for Pear, the naked fruits are forced to hide when Passion Fruit, Orange's sister and a tomato come and are unable to wear their clothes when Passion and Pear decide to give them to charity.
436	18	"MIXTER (Twister Spoof)"	6:13	May 5, 2017	7.21
In the style of Twister, a female carrot named Ellen makes herself a promise to find out what is causing the twisters after her father was whisked away by one 20 years ago, with her husband Bill, a bag of wheat seeds. They head for the kitchen, where the blender is causing a twister, due to its malfunctioning. This is the reason why and its battery-powered energy prevents it from shutting down after being unplugged. The two, and Orange, Grapefruit and Pear, have to seek shelter in the oven, but the twister activates the oven. Using his well-aimed speed spitting, Orange eats the metal probes that can stop the twister and spits them down the blades to shut it down.
437	19	"Glove Hate Relationship"	3:43	May 12, 2017	6.71
While playing Monopoly, Orange, Pear, and Midget Apple encounter a rubber kitchen glove that gets possessed whenever slipped onto a hand, therefore it can only do what the hand wants it to.
438	20	"ASK ORANGE SUPERCUT! [Episodes 1 – 30]"	2:00:41	May 19, 2017	5.44
A 2-hour supercut featuring every Ask Orange episode from September 26, 2011, to April 7, 2017.
439	21	"Cool Beans"	3:41	May 26, 2017	5.70
Zoom returns with his considered "cool friends" which are coffee beans and throw a party along with Orange, Grapefruit and Zoom while Pear tries to stop them.
440	22	"Iceberg Lettuce Secret Agent"	3:49	June 2, 2017	4.15
Orange meets a lettuce in a sink named "Iceberg Lettuce", a secret agent, and is working on a case to find out who has been murdering the foods for the past 9 years.
441	23	"TNT Party!"	5:20	June 9, 2017	5.66
A barrel of TNT is mad at the kitchen due to the speaker loudness, causing his butterfly collection to collapse. Pear realizes that as the fuse is getting shorter and shorter, the closer he is going to explode. The barrel of TNT mentions that all of his butterflies are signed "M.M.", which are Marshmallow's initials and gets Marshmallow's autograph. After his dreams comes true, Orange turns the speaker up at maximum and the barrel of TNT lets himself explode, causing the kitchen to collapse.
442	24	"Ask Orange #31: Best Episode EVER!"	5:23	June 16, 2017	5.60
Orange answers even more questions from his fans, which the episode is also mentioned as "the best Ask Orange episode ever".
443	25	"Pork-CHOPPED!"	3:29	June 23, 2017	5.91
Orange, Midget Apple and Grapefruit meet a $200 pork chop, who wants to get knifed and eaten, and his dream comes true – unfortunately it is not in the ideal way he wants it – he is overcooked and served with ketchup, much to his dismay.
444	26	"Foodsplosion! #7"	3:01	June 28, 2017	6.00
Orange is the host of the game show Foodsplosion in which contestants answer a question and then get killed with a certain object; this eighth episode is finally launched after a hiatus of 2 years and 3 months. This Episode's Guest: Cantaloupe Prizes: Trampoline and Sword
445	27	"Electrified Orange!"	4:32	June 30, 2017	5.88
After carelessly plugging in numerous electronics into one electric outlet while trying to soak in a Jacuzzi, Orange causes the power to go out, and Pear, who was shocked that Orange's actions caused an incredulous amount of money to pay for the month's electricity bills, calls the pickle electrician Pete, who is annoyed by Orange when the electrician tries to explain that the latter could get electrocuted from the hazards of his actions, but is dismissed by Orange. Pete tries to unplug the electronics from the outlet, but the electric discharge vaporises him.
446	28	"Bake It All (Shake It Off Parody)"	3:09	July 7, 2017	4.91
Orange sings a parody of Taylor Swift's Shake It Off, with several types of food and objects being knifed, hammered, crushed by an anvil and baked in the oven.
447	29	"Doomsday Peppers!"	3:19	July 14, 2017	5.46
In the style of Doomsday Preppers, Orange and Pear are forced to hide in a bunker with Lou the Tick, a red pepper and a green jalapeño due to the end of the world arriving at hand. The pepper and jalapeño are annoyed by Orange's jokes, but Lou reads the Prophecy of Doomsday, which came from Orange, who is said to be the Annoyer. A knife is summoned, but the five all survive. The pepper and jalapeño are left by Orange, Pear and Lou when the formers are stuck in a loop saying "The Prophecy" and are then crushed by a toaster.
448	30	"Poppyseed (Poppy Spoof)"	4:59	July 21, 2017	4.21
Orange is given a tongue cast by Dr. Bananas after his tongue is severely sprained from exceedingly using it to annoy people. Pear, Midget Apple and Grandpa Lemon are all thrilled to bits by the fact Orange cannot speak, but the joy is short-lived when the alien-like Poppyseed comes to the kitchen and questions with Pear about questions and statements of seeds; Pear, Grandpa Lemon and Midget Apple are freaked out by this. An annoyed Pear decides the five will leave, but everytime they try to escape, Poppyseed inexplicably appears every which way. Orange comes up with a plan by drawing how the stop the supernatural seed – with another seed from the citrus. Unfortunately, due to the injuries, the seed-spitting is severely crippled. However, Orange-seed starts conversing with Poppyseed – Orange-seed summons a hand by saying plant and Poppyseed is placed into the soil, but, much to the fruit quartet's dismay, Poppyseed grows into a Poppy-flower.
449	31	"Ask Orange #32: Indiana Orange!"	5:09	July 28, 2017	5.23
Orange answers even more questions from his fans, as well as making a show called Indiana Orange: Raiders of the Lost Fart.
450	32	"Rocketship Underpants"	3:31	August 4, 2017	5.62
Orange meets a pair of rocket ship-patterned underpants who is hiding in the drawer to escape two ears of baby corn who will use different methods of bullying him – the pair of underpants falls for the joke of Orange saying that they are there, but they are not. When they actually come, Rocketship Underpants is scared of them. Orange decides to annoy the two ears of corn and making baby jokes about them; in the end, they are mashed into a bowl of baby food and fed to a baby. Orange is thanked by Rocketship Underpants.
451	33	"Inanimate Orange"	4:25	August 11, 2017	5.00
Midget Apple does a kitchen exchange program exchanging Orange for another orange that does not talk. Meanwhile, in the other kitchen, he tries to annoy an apple that does not talk and instead he takes role of the apple and foods that look like his friends appear and he pretends that they are his friends and so Orange is returned with his real friends – Inanimate Orange is praised for accepting things that Orange would do the opposite of, however, Orange's beliefs of the deaths of the inanimate versions his friends made him insane, but is reverted to normal after Inanimate Orange is killed. This is the first episode that features inanimate foods.
452	34	"The Most Interesting Can in the World!"	4:31	August 18, 2017	5.20
Orange meets two cans of condensed tomato and onion soup who are concerned about what will happen after their expiration date – then they meet 'The Most Interesting Can in the World' who has claimed to have lived a century beyond his expiration date. Orange annoys him by making can-related puns and the latter is then reveals all the stories were legends and lies before being sent to the food bank.
453	35	"Ask Orange #33: Fidget Spinner of Doom!"	4:47	August 25, 2017	5.64
Orange answers even more questions from fans, as well as using fidget spinners and annoying Pear while as Mario.
454	36	"KitchenMon 2!"	3:48	September 1, 2017	6.11
Orange and Grapefruit get into another animated Kitchen-Mon battle when the Pokéball returns and is split open when Grapefruit tries to throw a barbell at Orange for making fun of him, like the first time, only for the barbell to hit the Pokéball instead.
455	37	"Sour Rangers #3: Disaster at Comic-Corn!"	5:32	September 8, 2017	5.93
The Sour Rangers go to the Comic-Corn convention, where the villains, Magfrito, Darth Tater and the Poker have captured the superheroes, BatPan and Robinero Sauce, Sailor Spoon and the Silver Scouts and the Teenage Mutant Ninja Turnips. Green sets them free and the MegaGourd forms to destroy Darth Tater's Death Starfish.
456	38	"Ask Orange #34: Orange Loves Passion!"	6:01	September 15, 2017	4.22
Orange answers even more questions from fans, as well Dr Bananas and Pear using a hologram to test if Orange would save himself or Passion Fruit, to determine the citrus loved her.
457	39	"Storytime #1: Hansel & Gretel!"	4:13	September 22, 2017	4:13
Pear reads the classical story of Hansel and Gretel while trying to put up with Orange's own twists, as he does not know anything about the story.
458	40	"BIRTHDAY CARD-SPLOSION!!"	3:32	September 29, 2017	6.00
Orange celebrates his birthday and annoys a present box continuously until it is ripped open, revealing Pear, Passion, Grapefruit, Midget Apple, Grandpa Lemon and a baby carrot wanting to surprise him.
459	41	"Blender Man!"	5:02	October 6, 2017	5.43
Orange, Pear, Midget Apple and Grapefruit tell each other scary stories in the forest when going camping – Grapefruit's tale is about Blender Man – who attacks individual victims and blends them. Orange, who does not believe it, goes and finds some firewood – though he grows paranoid after mistaking the actions of a measuring cup for Blender Man – it was supposedly a nightmare after the others were captured inside Blender, until it was revealed that Orange was also captured, the four fruits were then juiced and blended.
460	42	"Ask Orange #35: Shocktober Surprise!"	3:34	October 13, 2017	5.04
Orange asks some more Halloween-themed questions from fans, as well Orange revealing to have an evil twin – Midget Apple destroyed the real Orange instead, but they never knew.
461	43	"Annoying Orange vs. Tattletail"	3.22	October 20, 2017	5.09
During a stormy night, Orange befriends Tattletail and they both annoy an egg who is trying to shush them during quiet reading time. After a few minutes, Orange notices a speaker icon and Tattletail says his Mama is watching the trio. The lighting scares Orange and then the egg snaps after being continuously annoyed – he completely ignores Orange and subsequently is killed by Mama.
462	44	"Trick or Treat on Horror Street"	5.33	October 27, 2017	4.33
Orange, Pear, Midget Apple, Marshmallow and Grapefruit all go trick-or-treating on Horror Street – Midget Apple is absolutely afraid and against it, but the others want to go, due to being able to get king-sized candy bars. The five head to Neighbour's house, then Tattletail's and his Mama's. Marshmallow and Grapefruit go into the Neighbour's house, despite Midget Apple's objections, who is scared from playing too many horror video games. He and Orange are then separated from Pear – the run into a leaky ink pipe, where Bendy was hiding, Freddy Fazbear and Slender; the latter separates Orange from Midget Apple. When Midget Apple is surrounded, it is revealed that Orange, Pear, Marshmallow and Grapefruit disguised themselves as the villains to teach Midget Apple a lesson about playing too many of the horror games – Midget Apple agrees to lay off on them because of this.
463	45	"$1 vs $500 Popsicle"	4:32	November 3, 2017	6.66
Orange and Pear meet a $500 popsicle and the former starts annoying her by making ice-related puns. Then a $1 chocolate popsicle comes out from the freezer and is enraged to see her. Then they two clash against each, but when they fight with their sticks, the friction starts to cause a fire, prompting Orange, Pear and a fudge bar to escape, which they do, while the popsicles are killed in the ensuing explosion.
464	46	"Ask Orange #36: Absolutely No TNT in this Episode!"	4:56	November 10, 2017	7.52
Orange answers even more questions from fans, as well as featuring a live talk show of himself, due to Pear prohibiting TNT being used in the episode.
465	47	"PilGRIM Reaper"	4:00	November 17, 2017	2.00
The Pilgrim Reaper slices up food for Thanksgiving, however, before he attacks Orange and Pear, the wind blows away his hat, revealing he is just an angel food cake. Orange gives him two hats, which make the Reaper get laughed at, but then gets a Pilgrim hat from him. However, he is then served with chocolate drizzle and eaten.
466	48	"X-Massacre #1: Limp Biscuit"	3:54	November 24, 2017	0.34
Orange, Pear, Midget Apple and Grapefruit are trying to hide to escape being part of Christmas dinner, but a tube of crescent rolls constantly plays awful and loud music. He is warned that he is on the top of the list, but is not afraid and dismisses them. Things get worse when Limp Biscuit joins in – both of them are then killed afterwards.
467	49	"X-Massacre #2: Orange Beans!"	3:36	December 1, 2017	0.30
While Orange is painting everything in the kitchen orange with orange spray paint, he opens a cabinet where a box of green beans are trying to hide from being part of the next thing on the list, green bean casserole. Orange paints the beans orange and it works, until one of them realises that there is a hidden food for the X-Massacre, which is carrots. Orange inadvertently paints them green again after being told to paint them a different colour before they would be eaten as carrots. The beans are then cooked into the casserole.
468	50	"X-Massacre #3: Nutcracking the Code!"	4:36	December 8, 2017	0.31
Orange, Pear, Marshmallow, Midget Apple and Grapefruit are trying to extract a secret code from a chestnut, who is next on the list, but is not afraid and refuses to hide. They have trouble extracting the codes and cannot crack him. Knowing this, they then turn concerns to the next food, egg nog, who is annoyed, as well as Chestnut, by the egg nog jokes. Chestnut then starts to crack upon the annoyances from Orange, who then reveals the code: 000. Chestnut hopes for the hand to take him away, but the egg nog, who cannot stand Orange as well, is taken instead, much to Chestnut's dismay. The kitchen then sustains major damage when Orange puts the code into a keypad that triggers a missile attack barrage.
469	51	"X-Massacre #4: Figgy Pudding!"	3:23	December 15, 2017	0.40
Orange, Pear, Midget Apple and Grapefruit try to save figgy pudding, but they do not know what it is or who it is. Then the pudding appears behind them and he asks them who he is really after Orange asks the question. He then questions his existence of what he is. Orange, not understanding it, puts a name tag on him with the name Figgy Pudding – the pudding is then sliced and eaten. Orange then reveals he put a "Figgy Pudding" name tag on everyone's back while they were not looking and then they all run.
470	52	"X-Massacre #5: Pig Out!"	6:10	December 22, 2017	0.39
The kitchen is all muddy when Orange tried to cover the kitchen in dirt and snow – the snow melted and created the mud, which is bringing out a ham roast into the open, which is the last thing required for the Christmas dinner. The roast dismisses Pear's concerns for the former to leave and then annoys him with Orange with oinks and squeals from when he was a pig. The roast is then put in the oven for 45 minutes but cannot be carved due to being covered in the mud. However, the cooked roast is then fed to a dog instead. Suddenly a carrot appears from the shadows. He explains he was overlooked due to the fish magnet on the list (referenced in the second episode). Carrot shouts his name out loud in freedom, though the knife sees him and is then sliced up. With all the food prepared, Orange and Pear decide to go open presents and the citrus thanks the viewers for watching the X-Massacre, before they escape from a sudden knife.
471	53	"2017 Kills!"	3:42	December 29, 2017	0.84
All the characters killed in 2017 are seen in a montage.

=== Season 10 (2018) ===
No. overall	No. in season	Title	Time	Original release date	Online viewers (in millions)
472	1	"Storytime #2 Goldilocks and the Three Bears!"	4:21	January 5, 2018	1.11
Pear proceeds to read Goldilocks and the Three Bears, but Orange destroys his book and makes up his own version of the story.
473	2	"High Score in Guac-a-Mole!"	4:38	January 12, 2018	0.45
Orange aims for the high score in Guac-a-Mole and he goes so quickly it sends him into the game and then the guacamoles start whacking the oranges until the machine is destroyed. Orange learns his lesson and then he and the guacamoles play Pear hockey, much to Pear's dismay
474	3	"Tech Support"	5:04	January 19, 2018	0.75
Orange is watching and hilariously reacting to America's Best Groin Shots until the internet connection goes out and Pear shows the router's lights are all red so he tells the citrus to call tech support. Orange calls Lime Warner Cable but annoys the Call Centre Lime by thinking he said "rooster" instead of "router". Lime then was forced to come over to the kitchen and presses the reset button, which was the only thing to do. Lime is then pecked by an actual rooster after another annoyance about the two words. Orange then watches his videos with Pear and Marshmallow, who were both back from the cinema after bring denied entry for being "outside food."
475	4	"Ask Orange #37: SpongeBob OrangePants!"	4:51	January 26, 2018	1.15
Orange answers even more questions from fans, as well as singing the SpongeBob SquarePants intro in his own version.
476	5	"Annoying Orange – SAW (Crappy Captioned #7)"	3:21	February 2, 2018	0.59
A remake of "SAW" is made with the "terrible" Google automatic captions. This was inspired by Rhett & Link's "Caption Fail" videos.
477	6	"Storytime #3: The Three Little Pigs"	4:25	February 9, 2018	0.99
Pear proceeds to read The Three Little Pigs and believes Orange will not be a nuisance since the citrus went kazoo shopping. Unfortunately for Pear, Orange discovered online shopping and then, once again, destroys Pear's book and makes up his own version of the story.
478	7	"Ask Orange #38: Alien Farts?!"	5:16	February 16, 2018	0.46
Orange answers even more questions from fans, as well as suffering from the smell of alien farts.
479	8	"As Seen on TV!"	4:50	February 23, 2018	0.23
Orange stars on the Kitchen Shopping Network channel and Grapefruit, Midget Apple and Marshmallow are intrigued by the products and buy them with Pear's credit card, much to his anger and dismay. Pear objects to the products and attempts to send them back but one of them cannot be moved. Orange returns and is congratulated – then a stove fire occurs and everyone panics until Pear extinguishes it – however, the extinguisher sabotages a computer system to control aeroplanes and one crashes into the kitchen.
480	9	"Storytime #4: Snow White and the 7 Dwarfs"	3:54	March 2, 2018	0.57
Pear proceeds to read Snow White and the Seven Dwarfs and believes Orange will not be a nuisance since he is playing with a drone as a birthday present. Unfortunately for Pear, Orange's drone takes away Pear's book and Orange tells the story his own way.
481	10	"Pear Isn't Boring!"	3:58	March 9, 2018	0.44
After being deemed boring by the other fruits in the kitchen for being boring just for reading books, Pear sings a song with a rock guitar and rock star clothing in the style of Terabrite.
482	11	"Infinite Leprechauns!"	4:48	March 16, 2018	0.24
After finding Liam's pot of gold, Orange's three wishes are a cookie, another cookie, and a chocolate chip cloning machine so he can eat infinite cookies. However, when Liam slips into the cloning machine when trying to receive his pot of gold, he gets cloned.
484	13	"Ask Orange #39: The Circle of Knife!"	5:19	March 23, 2018	0.40
Orange answers even more questions from the fans, as well as attempting to sing a parody of Circle of Life from The Lion King but is unable to because of Pear pushing Orange off the counter because he could not lift him.
485	14	"Yu-Gi-Orange! (Yu-Gi-Oh! Parody)"	7:11	March 30, 2018	0.22
In Egypt, Orange, Pear and Midget Apple discover hieroglyphics in a pyramid about a battle known as the Millennial Games using the Food Monster cards in the present. Orange then somehow is able to put back the shattered Millennial Puzzle, however, Broccura then emerges from his tomb and then casts the Shady Realm, making Pear and Midget Apple vanish away and declares he shall conquer Egypt and the world. Orange then is transformed into Pharaoh and he duels Broccura in a card battle, in which the loser will spend eternity in the realm. The battle becomes eternally intense, with Broccura nearly defeating Pharaoh three times, however, a strategy from Pharaoh renders Broccura unable to use any monsters and then banishing him to the Shady Realm. Pear and Midget Apple then return safely and Pharaoh changes back into Orange. The three have no recollection of the events of the episode and then Orange destroys the puzzle after refusing to take it.
486	15	"Storytime #5: Jack and the Beanstalk"	3:37	April 6, 2018	0.21
Pear proceeds to read Jack and the Beanstalk, he tries to tell the real story, but Orange changes the story to have cows.
487	16	"Hug a Cactus!"	4:48	April 13, 2018	0.49
Orange and Pear set up speed dating for Huggy the Cactus.
488	17	"Ask Orange #40: Pear Bud!"	5:05	April 20, 2018	0.30
Orange answers even more questions from the fans, as well as Pear getting his own movie.
489	18	"Googalexiri!"	6:10	April 27, 2018	0.52
Orange steals the fruits' new voice assistants.
490	19	"Storytime #6: The Emperor's New Clothes"	3:14	May 4, 2018	0.33
Pear proceeds to read The Emperor's New Clothes, but Orange changes the story to have Annoying Orange clothes.
491	20	"Ask Orange #41: Orange Mind is BLOWN!"	4:22	May 11, 2018	0.32
Orange answers even more questions from the fans, as well as having his mind blow up.
492	21	"NASCAR Pit Crew #3"	4:12	May 18, 2018	1.09
The pit crew fruits and pit chief Pear are back as pit crew for Ty Lemon. When Orange gets fired from the pit crew, he must find a new job before Ty loses.
493	22	"The Wrath of Korn (Star Trek Spoof)"	7:04	May 25, 2018	0.41
In a spoof of Star Trek, Orange and friends must retrieve a Sega Genesis from Korn.
494	23	"Storytime #7: The Little Mermaid"	3:32	June 1, 2018	0.38
Pear proceeds to read The Little Mermaid, but Orange changes the story to have Sebastian as the main character.
495	24	"Ask Orange #42: Crush on Selena Gomez"	4:25	June 8, 2018	0.88
Orange asks more questions from the viewers, as well as Pear trying to lift off a can of crush off Selena Gomez.
496	25	"Dive Bomb!"	5:05	June 15, 2018	0.95
Orange uses his new drone to annoy Pear and Midget Apple.
497	26	"Annoying Orange Gets Lego'd!"	4:38	June 22, 2018	0.12
After entering into a box of Legos, the fruits enter into the Lego world, but things go awry when a hand smashes them into pieces.
498	27	"The Grapefruit Family Reunion"	6:26	June 29, 2018	0.52
Grapefruit organizes a family reunion for his family.
499	28	"Blues Berry"	3:58	July 6, 2018	0.66
Orange, Pear and Midget Apple enjoy music from a berry band.
500	29	"Story Time #8: The Ugly Duckling"	4:40	July 13, 2018	1.29
Pear proceeds to read The Ugly Duckling, but Orange changes the story to change the duckling's name to Ugmo and at the ducks' high school reunion, Ugmo is transformed into Cindy Crawford.
501	30	"Passion's Birthday Blowout"	6:02	July 20, 2018	0.69
The fruits organize a surprise party for Passion, but the party nearly gets ruined when the kitchen's insurance abjuster tries to check the whole kitchen for TNT, unaware that Orange hid TNT in a cookie jar.
502	31	"Ask Orange #43: Pear-achu"	4:12	July 27, 2018	1.84
Orange asks more questions from the viewers, as well as trying to catch Pear (who is dressed as a Pikachu).
503	32	"Foodbook"	4:24	August 3, 2018	0.80
Mark Zucchiniberg tells Orange about Foodbook.
504	33	"Driving Me Nuts!"	4:08	August 10, 2018	2.00
Orange tries to get his driver's license with the help of a chestnut.
505	34	"Storytime #9: Beauty and the Beast"	3:15	August 17, 2018	0.77
Pear proceeds to read Beauty and the Beast, but Orange interrupts the story and believes he and Pear are the prince's servants who were turned into fruits.
506	35	"Ask Orange #44: Fruitbusters!"	4:19	August 24, 2018	0.52
Orange asks even more questions from the fans, as well as a parody of Ghostbusters.
507	36	"Sour Rangers 4"	6:04	September 1, 2018	1:52
The Sour Rangers are back, and this time they have to defeat the evil Chiven Stews.
508	37	"Goldi-Lox!"	3:40	September 7, 2018	0.20
Orange and Pear try to get rid of a lox who's trying to check the kitchen.
509	38	"Ask Orange #45: Veloci-Rapper!"	5:00	September 14, 2018	0.90
Orange asks even more questions from the fans, as well as his favorite dinosaur.
510	39	"Storytime #10: The Tortoise and the Hare"	4:23	September 21, 2018	1.64
Pear proceeds to read The Tortoise and the Hare, but Orange changes the story for the tortoise to have Usain Bolt's feet, wings of a bat, and Fonzie's head, and the hare to have a cannon for an arm and wheels for legs.
511	40	"Kid Bubblegum"	4:11	September 28, 2018	1.31
Orange, Pear and Midget Apple get a new neighbor who tells them about her stuff in her old kitchen.
512	41	"Top 5 Halloween Costumes"	2:37	October 1, 2018	1.98
Orange presents the top five costumes to wear for Halloween.
513	42	"Strainer Things (Stranger Things Parody)"	4:46	October 5, 2018	1.13
In a parody of Stranger Things, Orange, Pear, Marshmallow and Grapefruit find out that Midget Apple is stuck down the sink with a strainer. The fruits meet a waffle named Eggo Waffle (nicknamed Eleven) who aspires to defeat the Demogourd who's down the sink with MIdget Apple.
514	43	"Storytime #11: The Legend of Sleepy Hollow"	3:37	October 12, 2018	0.89
Orange proceeds to read The Legend of Sleepy Hollow, but he messes up the story by adding animal combinations.
515	44	"Final Destina-Pun! (Final Destination Parody)"	4:13	October 19, 2018	1.47
Orange, Pear, and Little Apple are hanging out in the kitchen. Pear plans a trip to Pearis until he runs into a black cat, which is known for causing bad luck.
516	45	"Top 5 Halloween Pranks"	3:09	October 22, 2018	0.30
Orange presents the top five ways to prank someone on Halloween.
517	46	"Knife of the Living Dead!"	4:55	October 26, 2018	1.36
Midget Apple finds out that Orange has a sixth sense that lets him annoy dead people, but Orange goes too far and his sense wakes every fruit that has ever died.
518	47	"Pairing is Caring!"	5:40	November 2, 2018	1.60
Orange, Pear and Passion Fruit meet Pairing, a girl knife that Pear met online.
519	48	"Ask Orange #46: The Musical!"	5:10	November 9, 2018	1.00
Orange answers more viewer questions musical style.
520	49	"Thanksgiving Can Stuff It!"	4:22	November 16, 2018	1.25
Orange meets Stuffing, who desperately wants to not be eaten.
521	50	"Storytime #12: The Boy Who Cried Wolf"	3:55	November 23, 2018	0.94
Pear proceeds to read The Boy Who Cried Wolf, but Orange pranks Pear and ruins the book with his squirt flower.
522	51	"The TNT Song!"	3:02	November 30, 2018	0.76
Orange sings a song about his love for TNT.
523	52	"Storytime #13: A Christmas Carol"	3:36	December 7, 2018	1.98
Pear reads A Christmas Carol, but Orange alters the story by adding ghosts from different movies and TV shows instead of Jacob Marley's ghost and the Ghosts of Christmas Past, Present, and Future that visit Scrooge.
524	53	"Devoured by Santa!"	5:25	December 14, 2018	0.15
Two gingerbread cops investigate a Christmas crime with Orange and his friends.
525	54	"Christmas Goop! (FULL SONG)"	3:00	December 21, 2018	1.22
Orange sings a song about Christmas goop, a new tradition.
526	55	"Ask Orange #47: Infinity Gauntlet!"	4:03	December 28, 2018	2.01
Orange answers more questions, as well as claiming the Infinity Gauntlet.

=== Season 11 (2019) ===
No. overall	No. in season	Title	Time	Original release date	Online viewers (in millions)
527	1	"2018 KILLS!"	3:26	January 4, 2019	0.44
All of the characters who were killed in 2018 are seen in a montage.
528	2	"Storytime #14: Humpty Dumpty"	4:22	January 11, 2019	2.13
Pear proceeds to read Humpty Dumpty with Marshmallow, but Marshmallow changes the story to have cute things.
529	3	"Spongecake Squarepants!"	3:29	January 18, 2019	2.65
The fruits start a burger joint, only to get visited by a cake whose name is SpongeCake SquarePants (an homage to Stephen Hillenburg's SpongeBob SquarePants)
530	4	"Ask Orange #48: Baldi's in the Kitchen!"	4:50	January 25, 2019	1.96
Orange asks even more questions from the fans in the first Ask Orange of 2019, as well as having a reencounter with Baldi.
531	5	"Storytime #15: Aladdin!"	4:02	February 1, 2019	1.88
Pear proceeds to read Aladdin, but Marshmallow changes the story to have Aladdin wish different things.
532	6	"Annoying Orange vs. Emojis!"	3:54	February 8, 2019	3.99
Orange meets an emoji.
533	7	"Ask Orange #49: WORLD'S LONGEST WAZZUP!!!"	5:07	February 15, 2019	1.71
Orange asks even more questions from the fans, as well as doing the world's longest Wazzup.
534	8	"Annoying Orange vs. Spider-Man"	3:55	February 22, 2019	1.81
Orange annoys Spider-Man.
535	9	"Storytime #16: Cinderella"	4:55	March 1, 2019	1.52
Pear proceeds to read Cinderella, with Orange's return after 2 storytimes (and of course, he changes the story).
536	10	"Leprechaun Flu"	5:18	March 8, 2019	2.57
Orange, Midget Apple, Grapefruit and Marshmallow witness the effects of the Leprechaun Flu, which has been given to Liam.
537	11	"Somethings Smells!"	6:41	March 15, 2019	2.46
Orange, Pear, Midget Apple and Marshmallow show off perfume commercials, but when Passion Fruit turns to dust in her commercial, Orange believes she got Thanos snapped.
538	12	"The Boxing Bird Challenge"	4:04	March 18, 2019	1.68
Orange and Midget Apple attempt to do the Bird Box Challenge, but they are not sue about the rules.
539	13	"Jiggly the Juggler!"	5:04	March 22, 2019	1.98
Orange annoys Jiggly the Juggler.
540	14	"Ask Orange #50: It's Morphin Time!"	6:02	March 29, 2019	1.54
Orange is back with even more questions from the fans, including a parody of Power Rangers.
541	15	"Storytime #17: Rapunzel!"	4:00	April 5, 2019	1.66
Pear proceeds to read Rapunzel, but Orange changes the story (he guessed correctly in the first parts) to have radishes.
542	16	"Burrito King!"	6:05	April 12, 2019	1.25
Orange and Pear go into the freezer and meet the Burrito King.
543	17	"A Loud Place"	4:34	April 19, 2019	1.20
In a parody of A Quiet Place, Orange and the gang must be loud enough to prevent clattering teeth from attacking people in the kitchen.
544	18	"Annoying Orange vs. Thor"	3:43	April 26, 2019	1.14
Orange annoys Thor.
545	19	"Joke Book!"	3:36	April 29, 2019	1.14
Orange has fun telling jokes with a joke book.
546	20	"Ask Orange: #51: Gate Oven Hair!?"	6:33	May 3, 2019	1.27
Orange asks even more questions from the fans, as well as Scorpion being revealed to say "Gate oven hair!" rather than "Get over here!".
547	21	"Storytime #18: The Little Red Riding Hood"	4:24	May 10, 2019	1.94
Grapefruit and Marshmallow take over for Storytime, and they both read The Little Red Riding Hood.
548	22	"Annoying Orange vs. Zelda!"	3:48	May 17, 2019	2.84
Orange annoys Link.
549	23	"Hay Apple!"	3:49	May 24, 2019	3.02
Orange annoys Apple again, but this time with an apple made of hay.
550	24	"Ask Orange #52: The TNT is INSIDE Pear!!"	4:59	May 31, 2019	2.27
Orange asks even more questions from the fans, as well as trying to find TNT inside of Pear.
551	25	"Annoying Orange Lego'd #2: Really GRAPE Friends!"	3:45	June 7, 2019	4.13
A sequel to "Annoying Orange Gets Lego'd". A trio of wine grapes get terrorized by a foot who tries to squash them.
552	26	"Storytime #19: Puss in Boots"	4:43	June 14, 2019	6.15
Orange has to read Puss in Boots as it was written, and if Orange does a mistake, Pear has to ring the bell instead of yelling at him because his voice is gone for yelling at him too much for playing his kazoo for 12 hours.
553	27	"Annoying Orange vs. Buzz Lightyear!"	4:12	June 21, 2019	4.83
Orange annoys Buzz Lightyear.
554	28	"Ask Orange #53: Old People Making Out!"	7:10	June 28, 2019	4.21
Orange asks more fan questions including Orange's grandma kissing Grandpa Lemon.
555	29	"Annoying Orange vs Granny"	5:19	July 5, 2019	0.38
Orange annoys Granny.
555	30	"Amazon Return Pallet Challenge!"	4:49	July 8, 2019	3.16
Orange and Midget Apple do the Amazon Return Pallet Challenge.
556	31	"Storytime #20: Sleeping Beauty (Booty)!"	3:49	July 12, 2019	4.23
Pear proceeds to read Sleeping Beauty, but Orange (while high on caffeine from drinking too much coffee) changes the story's name to Sleeping Booty.
557	32	"Piece of Cake!"	4:06	July 19, 2019	2.64
Orange watches a cake beauty pageant.
558	33	"Ask Orange: #54: Who Cut the Cheese?!"	6:21	July 26, 2019	3.64
Orange asks even more questions from the fans, including the iconic "Who cut the cheese?" joke.
559	34	"Carrote CHOP!"	4:39	August 2, 2019	4.39
Orange meets and annoys Root Lee.
560	35	"Annoying Orange vs Aladdin"	4:08	August 9, 2019	4.64
Orange annoys Aladdin.
561	36	"Annoying Orange vs Elsa (Frozen Parody)"	3:59	August 16, 2019	3.35
Orange annoys Elsa.
562	37	"Slingin' Slang"	4:48	August 23, 2019	2.44
While Pear goes to the bathroom, Midget Apple and Grapefruit try to teach Grandpa Lemon about slangs.
553	38	"Joke Book #2: Jokes from Fans!"	3:40	August 26, 2019	5.24
Orange and Joke Book have fan telling more jokes that annoy Midget Apple
564	39	"Storytime #21: Peter Pan!"	3:56	August 30, 2019	4.11
Pear tries to read the story of Peter Pan, but Orange changes the story once again.
565	40	"A Snack on Titan (Attack on Titan Parody)"	4:23	September 6, 2019	5.44
In a parody of Attack on Titan, Orange, Pear, Midget Apple and Marshmallow must escape from the humans that are invading the kitchen.
566	41	"Ask Orange #55: Unidentified Flying Orange!"	5:32	September 13, 2019	3.63
Orange asks even more questions from the fans, as well as raiding Area 51.
567	42	"Annoying Orange vs Sonic the Hedgehog!"	4:05	September 20, 2019	5.22
Orange annoys Sonic the Hedgehog.
568	43	"Storytime #22: Frozen"	3:59	September 27, 2019	5.57
Pear tries to tell the story of The Snow Queen, which is the original version of Frozen, but Orange tries to tell some different stories, mishearing Pear who told him that the story is different.
569	44	"Ouija Board Challenge"	4:05	September 30, 2019	4.34
Midget Apple and Grapefruit do the classic Ouija Board Challenge.
570	45	"Creepy Pasta"	8:01	October 4, 2019	4.44
While Orange, Pear, Grapefruit and Midget Apple tell some creepypastas, an evil piece of pasta tells them some more scary creepypastas that make them disappear. Notes: The creepypastas told by Creepy Pasta are told in this way: The Tag – Midget Apple started getting annoyed by a tag that tickled his bottom by every night. He pulled it out and then his stem was cut off. Toilet Monster – There was a warning about not throwing paper rolls in the toilet. Grapefruit ignored it and started throwing paper rolls in the toilet. There was a secret, the paper rolls would always be fed to a monster that was at the sewers. The monster started getting bigger by every paper roll he was fed. It emerged out of the toilet and devoured Grapefruit and his next paper roll. Boaring – Pear was an algebra teacher. One day, his whiteboard actually boared a hole into a portal, and Pear got sucked into it. Some boars were inside the portal. Pear then turned into a boar and started teaching algebra inside the portal. Orange Slice – Orange's mom would always tell him not to play with knives. Orange then ignored his mother's warning, and started playing with them. Not much is known about this story since Creepy Pasta was forked when he was trying to tell the story.
571	46	"Jump Scare!"	8:15	October 11, 2019	3.31
Pear and Midget Apple think that Orange got possessed after Midget Apple gets jumpscared in FNAF: Sister Location. Orange starts possessing and killing the fruits.
572	47	"Annoying Orange vs Hello Neighbor!"	4:24	October 18, 2019	3.42
Orange and Pear try to introduce Mr. Peterson to the neighborhood.
573	48	"Fish Barfception Challenge!"	4:44	October 21, 2019	3.33
Midget Apple and Grapefruit do the Fish Barfception challenge, where they guess if they are in a dream or not.
574	49	"annoyingorange.exe"	7:27	October 25, 2019	5.229
Orange gets infected by an evil fire virus. He becomes Orange.exe and turns Pear, Midget Apple, and Grapefruit into an axe, a knife, and a toothpick. Things go back to normal when Marshmallow inserts the antivirus in the computer (except for Grapefruit, who's still a toothpick).
575	50	"Punnywise the Clown! (IT Spoof)"	9:12	November 1, 2019	4.34
A parody of It. Today's the anniversary of Orange Top's possession by Punnywise, and Pear and Midget Apple try to cover out.
576	51	"Storytime #23: Rumplestiltskin!"	3:55	November 8, 2019	6.22
Orange and Pear tell the story of Rumpelstiltskin, with Midget Apple acting as the titular character.
577	52	"Gummy Food vs Real Food Challenge"	3:29	November 11, 2019	6.22
Midget Apple and Grapefruit do the Gummy Food vs. Real Food Challenge, where they eat two different foods, a real one and a gummy one, to guess what it is. However, Grapefruit starts eating rocks.
578	53	"Ask Orange #56: Grapefruit is WEAK!"	5:20	November 15, 2019	4.22
Orange asks even more questions from the fans, including the statement that Grapefruit is weak.
579	54	"Turkey Jerky!"	5:16	November 22, 2019	3.31
Orange meets an irritable turkey who swears all the time, every time he swears, he gets censored. Orange wants to get censored too, so the turkey tries to teach him.
580	55	"Annoying Orange vs. Terminator"	3:59	November 29, 2019	3.11
Orange annoys the Terminator.
581	56	"Monster Burger #2: Beyond Burger"	4:19	December 6, 2019	4.13
Orange meets another burger, whom he also thinks he is a monster. The burger tells Orange he is a beyond burger, which makes Orange believe he is an alien.
582	57	"Brain Freeze Challenge!"	4:13	December 9, 2019	5.16
Orange and his friends do the Brain Freeze Challenge, where they try eating frozen treats without getting a brain freeze. However, Grapefruit gets frozen from the food.
583	58	"Ask Orange #57: Christmas is CANCELLED!!!"	5:43	December 13, 2019	3.22
Orange asks even more questions from the viewers, but Pear tells him that Christmas is cancelled.
584	59	"Orna-MENTAL!!!"	4:18	December 20, 2019	3.63
Orange discovers that an ornament named Goldie gets more dumber and violent each time he breaks.
585	60	"2019 KILLS!"	3:18	December 27, 2019	TBA
All the foods that were killed in 2019 are seen in a montage.

=== Season 12 (2020) ===
No. overall	No. in season	Title	Time	Original release date	Online viewers (in millions)
586	1	"Annoying Orange vs The Joker!"	5:24	January 3, 2020	4.11
Orange annoys The Joker.
587	2	"Annoying Orange vs GODZILLA!"	4:23	January 10, 2020	3.43
Orange annoys Godzilla.
588	3	"Spice Spice Baby!"	5:18	January 17, 2020	2.55
Orange and Pear meet a vanilla spice who can rap, but cannot rhyme.
589	4	"Ask Orange #58: The Sky is Falling on Pear!!"	5:44	January 24, 2020	TBA
Orange asks even more questions from the fans, including 1 million different objects being dropped on Pear.
590	5	"The Backpack Challenge!"	4:13	January 27, 2020	4.42
Midget Apple and Grapefruit do the Backpack Challenge at a playground.
591	6	"Storytime #24: Pinocchio!"	4:09	January 31, 2020	4.77
Pear reads Pinocchio, but Orange adds violence to the story.
592	7	"Foodsplosion! #8"	3:29	February 3, 2020	5.55
Orange stars as the host of the game show Foodsplosion, where foods of all kinds answer a question and no matter if they are right or wrong, they win a prize, which ends up killing them. The Episode's Guest: Professor Milk Prize: TNT
593	8	"Gumbrawl #2"	4:16	February 7, 2020	3.66
In a sequel to the first "Gumbrawl" Orange meets another gummy worm who desperately wants to take a candy girl to the Annual Gumball.
594	9	"Baby Yoda Visits the Kitchen!"	5:29	February 14, 2020	4.22
Orange and Pear find an egg-like ship which turns out to be Baby Yoda's ship. Meanwhile, Grapefruit tries to woo some girls, but Baby Yoda ruins it.
595	10	"Storytime #25: The Sword in the Stone"	3:20	February 21, 2020	3.75
Pear reads The Sword in the Stone, but Orange changes the story to include WWE wrestlers.
596	11	"Foodsplosion #9: Soda vs Mentos!"	3:05	February 24, 2020	6.71
Orange is the host of the game show Foodsplosion, where foods of all kinds answer a question and no matter if they get it right or wrong, they win a prize, which ends up killing them. The Episode's Guest: Orange Soda Prize: Mentoes
597	12	"Ask Orange #59: Super Smash Orange!"	4:20	February 28, 2020	8.31
Orange answers even more questions from the fans, as well as wondering how his moveset in Smash Bros would be.
598	13	"Annoying Orange vs. Lego Minifig"	3:14	March 2, 2020	5.42
Orange meets a minifig named George.
599	14	"Funny Farm"	4:40	March 6, 2020	7.02
Orange annoys the Farm Animals.
600	15	"Draw My Life!"	4:26	March 13, 2020	12.25
Orange does a DRAW MY LIFE about himself.
601	16	"Dr. Pill"	5:36	March 20, 2020	4.12
Orange's friends get him a therapist that unfortunately gets annoyed by him.
602	17	"Ask Orange #60: Baldi vs Fred!!!"	5:25	March 27, 2020	3.22
Orange answers even more questions from the fans, as well as Baldi getting screamed by Fred.
603	18	"Kitchenmon #3 – WAZZZZABI!!!!"	4:41	April 3, 2020	5.98
Grapefruit is complaining that he has a butt, but Orange doesn't think so. Grapefruit proves it by turning his back, but it blinds Pokeball and it causes her to fall off the counter, changing the animation style once again. Orange and Grapefruit get into another Kitchenmon battle. Grapefruit chooses Nude Dude and Orange chooses Copper Lincoln. Nude Dude's nudeness blinds Copper Lincoln and defeats him. Orange chooses Wassabi and they and Nude Dude start a Wazzup. Grapefruit brings out Nude Dude and chooses Knife. Knife also gets into the Wazzup. While Grapefruit proclaims that he'll never be defeated since he has stronger Kitchenmon, he is sliced by Knife. Orange wins.
604	19	"Family Food! (Family Feud Spoof)"	4:35	April 10, 2020	6.55
Orange and the fruits compete against the veggies in Family Food.
605	20	"See 10 Do 10 Challenge"	4:10	April 13, 2020	6.19
Orange does the See 10 Do 10 Challenge, but his challenges end miserably.
606	21	"Storytime #26: Dumbo!"	3:57	April 17, 2020	5.93
Pear tries to tell the storytime for Dumbo.
607	22	"The Juice #8: Favorite YouTube Channels!?!?"	4:20	April 20, 2020	4.42
In this episode of The Juice, the gang discuss their favorite YouTube channels.
608	23	"Annoying Orange vs Minecraft #2: Return to Steve!"	4:59	April 24, 2020	5.88
Orange returns to Minecraft and annoys Steve again.
609	24	"Wheel of FourCHEESE!"	5:37	May 1, 2020	5.94
Orange and his friends compete in Wheel of FourCheese.
610	25	"Storytime #27: The Lion Tiger King!"	3:54	May 8, 2020	3.51
Pear tries to read The Lion King, but Orange changes the story with elements from Tiger King.
611	26	"Ask Orange #61: Annoying TNT"	5:50	May 15, 2020	TBA
Orange asks more questions from fans, as well as becoming TNT.
612	27	"Annoying Orange vs Iron Man!"	3:54	May 22, 2020	4.26
Orange annoys Iron Man.
613	28	"Skewerz!"	5:06	May 29, 2020	5.22
Orange and Pear find a box that contains several dog-like skewers. This video was made to promote the new AO game of the same name.
614	29	"Annoying Orange vs Diamond Play Button!!"	5:04	June 5, 2020	TBA
Orange gets 10,000,000 subscribers and annoys a diamond play button.
615	30	"Passion Has a BOYFRIEND?!?!?"	5:55	June 12, 2020	TBA
Passion returns from Argentina with her new boyfriend, GG.
616	31	"Ask Orange #62 – Orange Goes Super Saiyan"	6:42	June 19, 2020	TBA
Orange asks more questions from the fans, as well as becoming Super Saiyan. Passion and GG are also revealed to be cousins.
617	32	"Annoying States of America!"	4:19	June 26, 2020	TBA
The gang is undecided on where to go for their road trip, and a map tries to show them where.
618	33	"The Juice #9: TIME TRAVEL!!"	5:47	June 29, 2020	5.88
In this episode of The Juice, the gang discuss about the time period they'd like to go to.
619	34	"Ice Cream Headache!"	3:25	July 3, 2020	TBA
Orange annoys an ice cream.
620	35	"TOP PUN! (Top Gun Spoof!)"	5:43	July 10, 2020	TBA
Orange meets the Top Gun members.
621	36	"Ask Orange #63: AXE Orange!"	4:57	July 17, 2020	TBA
Orange asks more questions, as well as being an axe.
622	37	"Storytime: 101 Dalmatians!"	5:02	July 24, 2020	TBA
Pear reads 101 Dalmatians, while Orange adds dancing babies to the story.
623	38	"Kidney Seed Attack!"	4:13	July 31, 2020	TBA
Orange's kidney seed is causing him to scream like a girl, and Dr. Bananas does a checkup on him.
624	39	"Clonin' Around!"	7:19	August 7, 2020	TBA
Dr. Bananas creates a clone of Orange who becomes evil.
625	40	"Ask Orange #64: Pear's WORST Nightmare!"	5:40	August 14, 2020	7.11
Orange asks more questions, as well as Pear having nightmares, and Foxy jumpscares.
626	41	"Annoying Orange vs Thanos!"	5:15	August 21, 2020	6.45
Orange annoys Thanos.
628	42	"Buttery Butterfly Butts (Original Song)"	1:40	August 24, 2020	6.66
An original song about buttery butterfly butts.
627	43	"Baby Annoying Orange"	4:04	August 28, 2020	4.68
Pear has trouble babysitting Orange's baby cousin.
628	44	"Annoying Orange Vs The World's Largest Knife!!"	5:54	September 4, 2020	4.74
Orange faces off against the world's largest knife.
629	45	"Storytime #28: King Midas and the Golden Touch!"	3:41	September 11, 2020	7.07
Pear tries to read King Midas.
630	46	"Hot Lava BUTT Cake!!"	4:29	September 18, 2020	7.66
Orange annoys a bundt cake.
631	47	"Ask Orange #65 – Subscribe or ELSE!"	4:16	September 25, 2020	5.24
Orange asks more questions, as well as singing a song about subscribing.
632	48	"Siren Head vs Kazoo Head"	4:29	October 2, 2020	6.72
Orange annoys Siren Head.
633	49	"THE SLIME!"	5:58	October 9, 2020	6.85
A mysterious slime is trapping the fruits.
634	50	"Jump Scare #2: Fruity FazPear's Pizza"	7:38	October 16, 2020	TBA
In the sequel of the previous Jump Scare!, the gang spends the day at a Five Nights at Freddy's parody restaurant when they find out that evil robots have returned to steal their skins, forcing a paranoid Little Apple to save everyone… again.
635	51	"Under the Bed!"	4:24	October 23, 2020	TBA
636	52	"Draw My Life NIGHTMARE EDITION!"	4:49	October 26, 2020	TBA
636	52	"Malloween!"	7:10	October 30, 2020	TBA
After a night of trick-or-treating, Marshmallow gets possessed by a corrupted purple bucket and terrorizes everyone.
637	53	"Creepy Pasta #2"	21:51	October 31, 2020	TBA
A supercut of every Creepy Pasta episode.
638	54	"Annoying Orange is AMONG US!"	5:04	November 6, 2020	TBA
639	55	"Storytime: Friday the 13th!"	4:18	November 13, 2020	TBA
Pear goes through one of his unluckiest Storytime episodes yet as he tries to read the story of Friday The 13th.
640	56	"Ask Orange #66: TNT ABC's!"	6:08	November 20, 2020	TBA
641	57	"1,000,000 IQ Annoying Orange vs Among Us"	3:58	November 27, 2020	TBA
642	58	"KitchenMon #4: Rattle Royale!!"	4:35	December 9, 2020	TBA
643	59	"Ask Orange #67: Christmas-Ception!!!"	5:13	December 11, 2020	TBA
644	60	"Storytime: Rudolph the Red Nosed Reindeer!"	4:06	December 18, 2020	TBA
645	61	"All I Want for Christmas is Goo!! (Christmas Song Parody)"	3:34	December 25, 2020	TBA
In a Music Video parody, Orange sings All I Want for Christmas is You; but instead, he sings about how he wants Christmas Goop this Christmas.

=== Season 13 (2021) ===
No. overall	No. in season	Title	Time	Original release date	Online viewers (in millions)
646	1	"2020 KILLS!"	4:08	January 1, 2021	0.394
A montage of the characters who died in 2020.
647	2	"Rolling in the Dough #2: Mo' Money, Mo' Funny"	5:01	January 8, 2021	1.408
A sequel to "Rolling in the Dough" (the most-viewed Annoying Orange video); Orange meets a rich lump of dough, who unfortunately gets baked into a pizza.
648	3	"Ask Orange #68: Who Let the Burps Out?!"	5:30	January 15, 2021	1.240
Orange answers more questions from the fans, as well as singing a song about burping.
649	4	"Bunker Burger!"	6:36	January 22, 2021	0.375
It's doomsday in the kitchen! Orange meets a moldy burger in a can who wants to be eaten.
650	5	"The Cow Song!"	3:25	January 29, 2021	0.512
Orange sings a song about his love for cows.
651	6	"Storytime #29: The Amazing Spider-Man!"	5:21	February 5, 2021	1.464
Orange and Pear tell the story of Spider-Man.
652	7	"Ask Orange #69 – Who's the Imposter?!"	5:21	February 12, 2021	1.286
Orange answers more questions from the fans, as well as someone being the impostor.
653	8	"Mr. Roast Beast Gives Me $1,000,000!"	5:35	February 19, 2021	0.272
The rich Mr. Roast Beast will give one of the fruits 1,000,000 dollars.
654	9	"Baby Orange is MISSING!"	4:47	February 26, 2021	0.811
A carton of milk finds out Baby Orange is the one on his missing picture, but he can't cope with his antics.
655	10	"Zoom Call!"	4:50	March 5, 2021	1.368
Pear tries to coordinate an "important" Zoom call.
656	11	"Annoying Orange vs Peppa Pig (Hog Wild!)"	4:02	March 12, 2021	0.736
Orange meets Peppa Pig and annoys other pigs.
657	12	"Baby Orange's First Word!"	4:55	March 19, 2021	2.506
Baby Orange says his first word.
658	13	"No Pants Dance!"	2:58	March 26, 2021	0.600
Orange sings about the No Pants Dance.
659	14	"Ask Orange #70: Notification Bell TNT!"	4:35	April 2, 2021	0.809
Orange answers more questions from the fans, as well as the notification bell being TNT.
660	15	"Annoying Orange vs Fall Guys!"	4:14	April 9, 2021	0.442
Orange participates in a Fall Guys tournament while annoying every competitor until he wins.
661	16	"Grapefruit's New Voice!"	5:31	April 16, 2021	0.537
Grapefruit volunteers as a test subject for Dr. Bananas to have his voice temporarily changed. Note: This episode introduces Jon Bailey of Honest Trailers fame as the new voice actor of Grapefruit.
662	17	"Monions!"	5:26	April 23, 2021	0.958
Orange meets the Monions, parodies of the Minions that are onions.
663	18	"Storytime: Batman!"	3:53	April 30, 2021	0.308
Orange and Sis tell the story of Batman.
664	19	"Gravy Barf!"	4:18	May 7, 2021	0.485
Orange makes his own parody of Baby Shark, much to Sis and Pear's disgust.
665	20	"Ask Orange #71: ORANGE IS THE IMPOSTER!!!"	5:37	May 14, 2021	0.607
Orange answers more questions from the fans, as well as being the impostor. This episode was formerly called "Unicorn Surprise!".
666	21	"Stress Ball!!!"	6:47	May 21, 2021	0.821
Orange signs up to be a stress ball.
667	22	"The Annoying Orange vs McDonalds"	4:16	May 28, 2021	0.337
Orange annoys a cashier at a McDonald's.
668	23	"Marsh Pit!!"	4:15	June 4, 2021	0.594
Marshmallow is done for the day hanging out with cute animals. Orange and Pear discover that Marshmallow has a secret techno music studio named Studio YAY!
669	24	"Ask Orange #72: The Final Boss!"	5:18	June 11, 2021	0.431
Orange must defeat the Final Boss! A large stick of TNT with a time bomb and legs.
670	25	"New Butt Shopping"	5:45	June 18, 2021	0.672
Midget Apple and Sis help Corey shop for a new butt with Orange joining them further down the road.
671	26	"Annoying Orange vs Friday Night Funkin'"	4:09	June 25, 2021	1.122
Orange battles Boyfriend from The Newgrounds Hit Rhythm Game and Orange impresses Girlfriend so much with his puns that she decides to stay. Fun Fact: The Rap Battle Music That Orange And Boyfriend Were Using Was From The Song "Pico" In Week 3 Where Boyfriend Rap Battles His Ex Pico From Pico's School
672	27	"Fruit Your Own Adventure: Start Here!!!"	3:23 (combined)	July 2, 2021	0.356 (combined)
Orange has the choice to make or break Apple's life. Which will he choose? Which one will you choose?!
673	28	"Annoying Orange vs Walmart!!"	4:28	July 9, 2021	0.238
Orange invades a Walmart and makes the smiley face… Angry?
674	29	"Babysitting Baby Annoying Orange – Amusement Park"	4:34	July 16, 2021	0.593
Pear takes Baby Orange to the amusement park, and of course it doesn't work out as normal as Pear expected.
675	30	"Annoying Orange vs. Disneyland"	3:36	July 23, 2021	0.269
Orange goes to Disneyland and starts annoying all of the staff members and tourists.
676	31	"Ask Orange #73: Annoy Pear Button!"	5:31	July 30, 2021	0.302
Orange answers questions from fans, as well as inventing a button that annoys Pear.
677	32	"Glitter Bomb vs Porch Pirates!"	5:41	August 6, 2021	0.126
Pear and Midget Apple see an advertisement for a glitter bomb and ask Orange to make a prototype. But Orange completely misinterprets the uses for the product and does serious kitchen damage. This episode used to be called just "Glitter Bomb!".
678	33	"FRYDAY 2: Revenge of the French Fries"	3:19	August 13, 2021	0.341
A sequel to the hit 2011 parody of "Friday" by Rebecca Black. Orange, Pear. Little Apple and Passion once again go to a restaurant to get food. But this time, thanks to the outcome aftermath of the original November 25, 2011 "FRYDAY" parody, the french fries are back for revenge. They chase Orange, Pear and Passion until Midget Apple raps in his monster truck destroying the evil fries and saves the day. The gang has learned their lesson and then decides to go get some cheeseburgers instead.
679	34	"Annoying Orange vs Amazon Alexa!"	3:55	August 20, 2021	0.413
Orange annoys an Amazon Alexa.
680	35	"Storytime: Charlie and the Chocolate Factory!"	5:34	August 27, 2021	0.347
Orange and Pear read the story of Charlie and the Chocolate Factory.
681	36	"Babysitting Baby Annoying Orange: Gary Poppins!"	4:23	September 3, 2021	0.185
682	37	"Rollin' in the Dough – 4K Remaster"	3:24	September 10, 2021	0.255
683	38	"Ask Orange #74: Ask Pear!!"	4:48	September 17, 2021	0.494
Pear asks questions from fans instead of Orange.
684	39	"Storytime: Superman!"	5:27	September 24, 2021	0.200
685	40	"Pear Needs Hugs!"	5:24	October 4, 2021	0.203
686	41	"Creepy Pasta # 3: Insane Asylum!!!"	10:11	October 8, 2021	0.305
687	42	"TOILET TERROR!"	8:24	October 15, 2021	0.193
688	43	"Death by Jigsaw"	9:10	October 22, 2021	0.241
689	44	"Dead END!!"	6:03	October 29, 2021	0.200
690	45	"Annoying Orange vs Target!"	6:03	November 5, 2021	0.167
691	46	"Annoying Orange Vs Mario Kart #2!!"	3:20	November 12, 2021	0.155
692	47	"Annoying Squid Game"	6:36	November 19, 2021	0.155
693	48	"Storytime: Shrek!"	5:15	November 26, 2021	0.228
Orange and Pear read the story of Shrek.
694	49	"Bigfoot Sighting!"	5:37	December 3, 2021	0.117
Orange and Lou try to find Bigfoot in the woods.
695	50	"Ask Orange #75: Infinite Airbags!"	4:03	December 10, 2021	0.256
Orange answers more questions from the fans, as well as Pear getting hit by infinite surprise airbags.
696	51	"RAPPING Paper!!"	4:03	December 17, 2021	0.105
The fruit gang's Christmas presents are wrapped in the same wrapping paper, who turns out to be a rapper who spoils the fruits' presents.
697	52	"Winter Formal"	5:07	December 24, 2021	0.102
Orange tries to find a date for a winter formal.
698	53	"2021 KILLS VIDEO!!!"	4:16	December 31, 2021	0.9
A montage of the characters who were killed in 2021.

=== Season 14 (2022) ===
No. overall	No. in season	Title	Time	Original release date	Online viewers (in millions)
699	1	"Sole Mates!"	4:05	January 7, 2022	0.108
Orange decides to make friends with a shoe who's missing his other half.
700	2	"SNOW DAY!!!"	6:24	January 14, 2022	0.135
The Kitchen Crew decides to make today a snow day to avoid school.
701	3	"Ask Orange #76: The Oscar Goes to Orange!"	4:56	January 21, 2022	TBA
Today, Orange wins an Oscar!
702	4	"School Picture Day!"	6:07	January 28, 2022	0.175
The new (and quite serious) school photographer tries to get some serious and not-so-funny photos in today's yearbook, but something soon gets out of hand…
703	5	"Annoying Orange vs The Hulk!"	3:56	February 4, 2022	TBA
The Annoying Orange annoys the Incredible Hulk!
704	6	"Storytime: Titanic!"	4:59	February 11, 2022	TBA
Sis adds an awesome twist to the story of the Titanic.
705	7	"Eye for an i-Phone!"	4:04	February 18, 2022	0.112
When an iPhone arrives in the kitchen, Orange decides to annoy the hi tech heck out of him with props, puns and a whole bunch of soup.
706	8	"I Bought a Tesla!"	7:23	February 25, 2022	TBA
The Annoying Orange decides to buy a Tesla.
707	9	"Annoying Customer Service!"	5:38	March 4, 2022	TBA
708	10	"Mugging It Up!"	3:43	March 11, 2022	TBA
709	11	"Annoying Orange vs Shrek!"	3:24	March 18, 2022	TBA
The Annoying Orange annoys Shrek.
710	12	"Ask Orange #77: Angry Karen in the Kitchen!"	5:21	March 25, 2022	TBA
Orange answers more questions from fans, as well as meeting an angry Karen.
711	13	"Storytime: Jurassic Park!"	5:33	April 1, 2022	TBA
712	14	"Alpaca Rap! (Full Song)"	3:15	April 8, 2022	TBA
713	15	"Ask Orange #78: Ask Lou the Tick!"	7:06	April 15, 2022	TBA
Lou asks questions from fans, as well as him connecting threats from the number 78 (the number of cards in a typical tarot deck, the atomic number of platinum, and the number of revolutions per minute of a gramophone). The acronym for TGP is "The Great Prophecy".
714	16	"Wasabi Speedo Party!"	4:55	April 22, 2022	TBA
715	17	"Fartichoke!"	4:33	April 29, 2022	TBA
716	18	"Storytime: Star Wars!!"	5:18	May 6, 2022	TBA
Orange reads Pear the whole Star Wars franchise, but Orange legally changes the story and makes Jar Jar Binks the main character of the whole story and the franchise.
717	19	"Ask Orange #79: Everything Annoying Orange!"	4:26	May 13, 2022	TBA
718	20	"Testing Viral Food Hacks!"	6:40	May 20, 2022	TBA
719	21	"Back to the Future to Save Grapefruit's Voice!"	6:51	May 27, 2022	TBA
Orange, Pear and Marshmallow are seen playing Go Fish, then Grapefruit gives them flowers. Midget Apple said that Dr. Bananas made the latest invention, a time machine. When Grapefruit gets mad at Dr. Bananas for making another invention and not the one he was hoping for, he accidentally embarrasses himself by peeing himself over the Internet, the crowd recording him pee, and it went viral. He and Dr. Bananas go 1 month in the future to prevent that from happening. Grapefruit and Dr. Bananas notices Pear and Marshmallow are different.
720	22	"Ask Orange #80: Throwing Shade!!"	5:00	June 3, 2022	TBA
Orange asks more questions from fans, as well as throws shade the wrong way at Pear.
721	23	"Baby Orange Goes to Daycare!"	7:33	June 10, 2022	TBA
Pear drops Baby Orange at daycare, but soon he and the rest of the babies cause havoc and madness throughout the daycare.
722	24	"PRIDE (Marshmallow's TRUE gender!!!)"	5:05	June 17, 2022	TBA
After 12 years, Marshmallow's gender is finally revealed; Marshmallow is non-binary!
723	25	"Monster Burger #3: Big Mac ATTACK!"	5:58	June 24, 2022	TBA
724	26	"Storytime: The 3 Billy Goats Gruff!"	4:52	July 1, 2022	TBA
Orange and Little Apple decide to tell the story of The Three Billy Goats Gruff, but that ends up really bad!
725	27	"Orange vs Pokemon!"	5:47	July 8, 2022	TBA
Orange annoys Ash and Pikachu from the popular game franchise Pokémon!
726	28	"Ask Orange #81: Thomas the TERROR Engine!!!"	6:12	July 15, 2022	TBA
727	29	"Annoying Orange vs Harry Potter!"	4:31	July 22, 2022	TBA
Orange decides to annoy Harry Potter during a Quidditch match.
728	30	"Annoying DMV!"	4:48	July 29, 2022	TBA
In this episode, Orange runs the DMV and has all sorts of bad jokes and word-plays for his first customer: a poor apple that just wants to get his license.
729	31	"Boot Camp!"	7:15	August 5, 2022	TBA
Orange gets sent to boot camp… and his drill instructor is an actual boot!
730	32	"Bean There, Pun That! (ft. Rebecca Parham)"	6:38	August 12, 2022	TBA
Orange decides to annoy a can of green beans.
731	33	"Ask Orange #82: Dodge Rock!"	5:37	August 19, 2022	TBA
Orange asks more questions from fans, as well as everyone playing dodge rock.
732	34	"The Hunger Games Trivia Challenge!"	4:58	August 26, 2022	TBA
A trivia challenge hosted by Orange ends up turning into the actual Hunger Games!
733	35	"Annoying Orange vs Minecraft #3: Survival Island!!"	4:46	September 2, 2022	TBA
734	36	"Ask Orange 83: Plastic Surgery!"	5:58	September 9, 2022	TBA
735	37	"Flour Child!"	5:06	September 16, 2022	TBA
A hippie-like bag of flour shows Orange the way of peace and love.
736	38	"SHOCKTOBER 2022 IS COMING! (Teaser)"	1:08	September 30, 2022	TBA
737	39	"Scream for Ice Cream 2: I Scream Truck"	9:21	October 7, 2022	TBA
When Orange ends up possessed by a ghost, this time from within an old haunted ice cream truck, the gang decides to investigate what's going on.
738	40	"Wickedpedia"	7:16	October 14, 2022	TBA
Orange, Little Apple, and Pear have to deal with Wickedpedia, a more evil version of Wikipedia.
739	41	"The Outhouse"	9:39	October 21, 2022	TBA
Orange and his friends go on a vacation at a cabin, and the cabin owner leaves them a surprise gift. However, things are not as they seem when the gang comes face to face with a haunted outhouse.
740	42	"Jump Scare 3"	11:00	October 28, 2022	TBA
A group of aliens lands on Earth to scare the gang out of their skin!
741	43	"Grand Slammed"	4:53	November 4, 2022	TBA
While relaxing on the baseline of a baseball field, Orange helps a friendly little baseball defeat his greatest foe.
742	44	"Ask Orange #84: OH BABY!"	5:10	November 11, 2022	TBA
743	45	"Storytime: The 1st Thanksgiving!"	4:05	November 18, 2022	TBA
Pear tries telling Orange the story of the first Thanksgiving but fails instantly!
744	46	"Mystery Orange Button!"	4:14	November 25, 2022	TBA
Orange gains the ability to travel back to the past thanks to a magic button.
745	47	"Things Annoying Oranges Say!"	3:48	December 2, 2022	TBA
This is a list of all the things Orange (and maybe other annoying citruses like him) says.
746	48	"Storytime: FNAF"	4:24	December 9, 2022	TBA
747	49	"Ask Orange #85: Marshmallow's On the Naughty List!"	5:42	December 16, 2022	TBA
Orange asks more questions from fans, as well as Marshmallow is on the naughty list from the very first time in Christmas noon, a couple of days ago.
748	50	"Pear vs 100 Mystery Buttons!"	4:31	December 23, 2022	TBA
Pear is trapped in a box full of 100 Orange mystery buttons.
749	51	"2022 Kills! (Every Death from this year)"	4:18	December 30, 2022	TBA
This is a montage of fruits, objects and other characters that were killed in 2022.

=== Season 15 (2023) ===
No. overall	No. in season	Title	Time	Original release date	Online viewers (in millions)
750	1	"Who Knows Passion Best Challenge!"	6:01	January 6, 2023	TBA
Orange, Grapefruit and Passion Fruit do a Challenge Video Called "Who Knows Passion Best Challenge".
751	2	"PUNderwear!"	4:28	January 13, 2023	TBA
Orange finds a new friend: a whimsical pair of underwear called Punderwear.
752	3	"Brick Rolled!"	5:18	January 20, 2023	TBA
753	4	"Ask Orange #86: Booger Frisbee!"	6:12	January 27, 2023	TBA
Orange asks more questions from fans, as well as gets hits with a booger frisbee.
754	5	"The Hydraulic Press Challenge #2!"	6:18	February 3, 2023	TBA
755	6	"Lie Detector Challenge #3: Do you Love Passion?!"	7:11	February 10, 2023	TBA
756	6	"Spa-Berries!"	6:22	February 17, 2023	TBA
757	7	"Ask Orange #87: Joining the RAINBOW FRIENDS?!"	6:05	February 24, 2023	TBA
Orange answers even more questions from fans, as well as him joining the Rainbow Friends.
758	8	"Thomas the SHANK Engine"	6:11	March 3, 2023	TBA
Orange annoys Thomas the Tank Engine.
759	9	"Stretched and Squished! – Eat My Shorts #1"	8:12	March 10, 2023	TBA
760	10	"Surviving on a Penny Challenge!"	5:03	March 17, 2023	TBA
761	11	"XXXTREME GRAPHIC VIOLENCE!!!"	7:32	March 24, 2023	TBA
762	12	"The Airbag Song (Full Version!)"	3:36	March 31, 2023	TBA
763	13	"Ask Orange #88: TNT Lollipop!"	3:39	April 7, 2023	TBA
Orange asks more questions from fans, as well as turning everyone into lollipops.
764	14	"Annoying Orange vs Power Rangers"	8:10	April 14, 2023	TBA
765	15	"Ranking Annoying Orange Thumbnails Tier List!"	4:54	April 21, 2023	TBA
766	16	"Asking AI to make Annoying Orange 1,000,000x funnier!!!"	6:46	April 28, 2023	TBA
ChatGPT would make the first episode from season 1 funnier and funnier. Notes: AI would generate the first episode funnier this way: 10x funnier: Orange is seen slipped by a banana peel, and Apple returns. Pear is seen wearing a funny hat and glasses. Plus, Orange has limbs. 100x funnier: Orange is seen bouncing with a pogo stick and makes funny faces, and him falling on a stool. Pear is wearing a Hawaiian shirt and a lei, with a ukulele. Pear and Apple are merged into one hybrid character named "PineappleApplePear". 1,000x funnier: Orange is seen sliding a banana peel and burps. Apple is making a PB&J. Orange jumps on a trampoline and making silly faces, and it would grab a whoopee cushion and hops one foot into Apple. Pear is seen wearing a UK flag hat with a pinwheel and a fake blue moustache. 1,000,000x funnier: Orange would do a comedy routine the wacky way (juggling fruits, slipping on a banana peel, doing a flip while holding a rolling pin, doing a flip over a rolling cantaloupe and playing a game of catch with a pineapple, and doing an impression of a penguin slipping on ice). Pear and Apple would melt into a puddle of fruit juice and meld together into PineappleApplePear.
767	17	"Talk Backwards Challenge #3"	4:37	May 5, 2023	TBA
768	18	"Annoying Orange vs Ice Cream Cone"	4:25	May 12, 2023	TBA
769	19	"Annoying Orange vs Doors"	6:51	May 19, 2023	TBA
770	20	"ANNOYING ORANGE vs RAINBOW FRIENDS"	6:57	May 26, 2023	TBA
771	21	"All Dressed Up!"	5:22	June 2, 2023	TBA
772	22	"Ask Orange #89: 1 Fart = 1 Sub!"	5:44	June 9, 2023	TBA
773	23	"Lego Challenge #2"	5:14	June 16, 2023	TBA
774	24	"Mortal Kumquat!"	10:04	June 23, 2023	TBA
When Orange enters the fight from Mortal Kumquat and also in a parody of Mortal Kombat.
775	25	"'MURICA!!! 🇺🇸🇺🇸🇺🇸"	4:55	July 3, 2023	TBA
776	26	"Toad Rage!"	5:16	July 7, 2023	TBA
777	27	"A to Z Shopping Challenge!"	5:02	July 21, 2023	TBA
Orange and Pear are doing the A-Z shopping challenge. Notes: Things that Orange and Pear put in the shopping cart: A – acrylic paint set B – blasting caps C – colored pencils D – dynamite E – eraser F – fuses G – glue stick H – "How To Explode Things" I – "Illegal Plans to Build an Explosive Device" J – Jar of cyclotrimethylene trinitramine K – keychain L – Lead mononitro resorcinate M – M&M's N – nitroglycerine O – oatmeal P – "Pyromania: An Autobiography-Slash-Confession" Q – Q-Tips R – Really Explosive Chemicals S – socks T – TNT U – underwear V – Very Explosive Chemicals W – water bottle X – X-tremely Explosive Chemicals Y – yo-yo Z – Zippo lighter
778	28	"Ask Orange #90: AI Orange!"	7:36	August 4, 2023	TBA
Orange asks more questions from fans, as well as him made an artificial intelligence robot of himself that "answer" questions (from ChatGPT).
779	29	"Dimension Sour!"	7:10	August 18, 2023	TBA
Orange, Pear and Midget Apple are eating sour candy, but they meet Sketchy Lemon. His trench coat is full of sour candies that take you to a whole another level of sourness. If they eat sour candies that contain extreme sourness, all they have to do is think sweet thoughts.
780	30	"Never Have I Ever Challenge"	4:58	September 1, 2023	TBA
781	31	"Baby Marshmallow!"	7:07	September 15, 2023	TBA
782	32	"Grimace Shake Gone VERY Wrong"	8:08	September 22, 2023	TBA
783	33	"Analog Horror Annoying Orange"	4:57	October 6, 2023	TBA
784	34	"Analog Horror Ask Orange (#91)"	8:01	October 20, 2023	TBA
785	35	"Surprise Scarebag!!!"	7:31	October 27, 2023	TBA
786	36	"Try Not to Die Challenge!"	4:04	November 10, 2023	TBA
787	37	"INHALING HELIUM!!! (All Blown Up!)"	3:48	December 1, 2023	TBA
788	38	"Baby Orange Gets a Snow Day"	4:14	December 15, 2023	TBA
789	39	"How the Grimace Shake'd Christmas!"	3:14	December 25, 2023	TBA

=== Season 16 (2024) ===
No. overall	No. in season	Title	Time	Original release date	Online viewers (in millions)
790	1	"2023 KILLS!"	4:07	January 5, 2024	TBA
A montage of the characters who were killed in 2023.
791	2	"Annoying Skibidi Toilet (Full Series)"	9:47	January 19, 2024	TBA
A supercut of the short series that the channel has released, and it is also a parody of Skibidi Toilet.
792	3	"Ask Orange #92: PRIME TIME!!!"	4:15	February 2, 2024	TBA
793	4	"Annoying Orange vs Subway"	3:49	February 16, 2024	TBA
Orange visits Subway with his customers.
794	5	"Annoying Orange vs Cybertruck"	4:21	March 1, 2024	TBA
Orange wins a Cybertruck, but has to interact with someone far more annoying than him to keep it.
795	6	"$10,000 Every Day You Survive in a Grocery Store (Mr. Beast Parody)"	4:18	March 15, 2024	TBA
Apple gets $10k for every day he spends in a grocery store, but there's one catch…Orange is trapped with him!
796	7	"Annoying Orange is NAKED!!! (Eat My Shorts #3)"	8:09	March 22, 2024	TBA
797	8	"Annoying Orange Out Pizzas the Hut"	4:12	April 5, 2024	TBA
Annoying Orange goes head to head with a Pizza Hut pizza in a competition of ultimate cheesiness!
798	9	"COPYRIGHT STRIKE ✖️✖️✖️"	4:14	April 19, 2024	TBA
Orange and his friends are put into trouble when the Hamburger Helper Helping Hand confronts them for breaking copyright rules.
799	10	"Outrageous Thinking Hacks: BOOST YOUR BRAINPOWER!!! (Thinking Outside the Box)"	4:56	May 3, 2024	TBA
Based on the No. 1 hit Short, Orange shows Pear all the squishy and squeezy ways he comes up with great ideas!
800	11	"NERF WAR MADNESS: Annoying Orange Takes Aim!"	3:47	May 17, 2024	TBA
801	12	"Guess The FNAF Characters Challenge with Annoying Orange, Marshmallow, And Sis!"	3:37	May 31, 2024	TBA
802	13	"8-Bit Annoying Orange: Gaming Legend Retro Rampage!"	6:37	June 14, 2024	TBA
803	14	"BABY ORANGE learns to DRIVE! (Annoying Orange)"	4:17	June 28, 2024	TBA
Pear takes on the ultimate challenge: giving Baby Orange a driving test at the DMV! Things quickly spiral into chaos as Baby Orange can't stop shouting "Go Vroom!" and causing mayhem on the road.
804	15	"Grapefruit Dated Taylor Swift!?"	4:05	July 12, 2024	TBA
Things get turned upside down when it's revealed that Grapefruit used to date Taylor Swift!
805	16	"Try Not to Laugh #5: Mouth to Mouth Challenge"	6:09	July 26, 2024	TBA
806	17	"Annoying Orange is EVERYTHING!!! (Eat My Shorts #4)"	9:01	August 9, 2024	TBA
807	18	"Annoying Orange Starts on Fire While Eating Spicy Wings"	3:35	August 23, 2024	TBA
Annoying Orange meets his match when Sean "Eggans" Evans has him on Hot Ones!
808	19	"Annoying Orange spends 7 DAYS in Solitary Confinement!!!"	4:58	September 6, 2024	TBA
When Annoying Orange spends 7 days in solitary confinement, the scientists studying him get more than they could ever bargain for!
809	20	"Introducing the Orange Vision Pro"	3:41	September 20, 2024	TBA
810	21	"Shocktober 2024 Teaser"	0:55	September 27, 2024	TBA
The launch of the Annoying Orange analog horror series.
811	22	"the faceless orange"	1:50	October 4, 2024	TBA
Analog Orange turns around to reveal a rotten spot on his back to Apple, and it causes smog and oil. The kitchen would start to have fire, cracks, explosions, and oil.
812	23	"Dimension VHS"	5:55	October 11, 2024	TBA
Apple discovers a creepy VHS tape from 2016.
813	24	"the Kitchen is Empty..."	5:14	October 12, 2024	TBA
Analog Orange haunts an empty kitchen.
814	25	"The Worst Knifemare"	5:25	October 18, 2024	TBA
Apple has a nightmare three times.
815	26	"i am forever"	2:03	October 25, 2024	TBA
816	27	"grapefruit's old voice"	1:20	October 26, 2024	TBA
817	28	"Ask Orange #93: What's Wrong with Orange?!"	5:22	November 15, 2024	TBA
818	29	"Dark Mystery of Analog Orange"	5:45	December 6, 2024	TBA
819	30	"Slay Ride"	6:12	December 20, 2024	TBA
Pear, Midget Apple, Marshmallow and Grapefruit find a sleigh that belongs to Analog Orange while on their way to Passion Fruit's house.

=== Season 17 (2025) ===
No. overall	No. in season	Title	Time	Original release date	Online viewers (in millions)
820	1	"What Is Creepy?"	4:56	January 10, 2025	TBA
Apple is confused and annoyed that he met Orange before.
821	2	"First Degree Burger"	5:10	January 25, 2025	TBA
Annoying Orange's No. 1 fan finds more than he bargains for in the middle of the forest.
822	3	"Jar Jar Stinks"	5:56	February 14, 2025	TBA
Pear and Grapefruit re-enter the dream world and the dimension where Analog Orange has managed to defeat the real Orange and imprison him in a jar. They see the real Orange, who is trying to free himself from his jar but to no avail. Orange then tells them that he knows a way to defeat Analog Orange by destroying all seven Orcruxes.
823	4	"Orcrux #1 Whistling Pinwheel"	8:53	March 7, 2025	TBA
The first Orcrux Orange, Pear and Grapefruit destroy is the Whistling Pinwheel located on the top of Whistler Mountain.
824	5	"Orcrux 2: Surprise Airbag"	8:29	March 28, 2025	TBA
The second Orcrux Orange, Pear and Grapefruit destroy is a Surprise Airbag located in an area that has airbags as a trap and an Endbag AirBoss that obstructs the area.
825	6	"Stuck in a Jar (Original Song)"	2:57	April 11, 2025	TBA
Pear and Grapefruit travel to find the next Orcrux to destroy, with Grapefruit carrying Orange stuck in a jar. Orange sings a song about his plight, with Pear eventually telling him to stop singing the song.
826	7	"Orcrux #3: The Warehouse"	12:38	April 25, 2025	TBA
The third, fourth and fifth Orcrux Orange, Pear and Grapefruit destroy are Kazooka (part-kazoo, part-bazooka), Missile Toe and Whoopee Cushy, located at a warehouse inhabited by several variants of Orange.
827	8	"Orcrux #4: THE FINAL BATTLE"	14:32	May 9, 2025	TBA
The last two Orcruxes that must be destroyed are TNT and Passion Fruit, until Analog Orange reveals his evil plan, which is that he kills Apple clones to increase his power, including the killing of Daneboe as well, causing him to rule the universe since 2017. But Orange has a way to get him by leading him and an army of clones to partake in so many annoying behaviors that Analog's brain is overwhelmed by the obnoxiousness and explodes. Orange also destroys the VHS. Note: This is the final episode of the Analog Orange arc.
828	9	"Taco Bell Farts (Original Song)"	3:42	May 23, 2025	TBA
Orange sings a musical number about the consequences of eating at Taco Bell, despite warnings from the others.
829	10	"Ask Orange #94 – Annoying Orange BRAINROT!"	9:03	June 6, 2025	TBA
Orange answers more questions from fans, and shows off things such as farting armadillos, broccoli yogurt, Pear dropped onto disgusting things, swimming in Legos, and even a touch of brainrot.
830	11	"AMMUNITION ORANGE"	6:12	June 20, 2025	TBA
Ammunition Orange (from the clone warehouse featured in "Orcrux 3: The Warehouse") tries to convince the Gingerbread Delivery Man to let him blow up his truck... for science, of course.
831	12	"PRANK WAR Challenge GONE WRONG!"	5:09	July 11, 2025	TBA
To Corey, a "prank war" equals real war, and he tests this comedic theory when Orange proposes a friendly one-on-one prank war, only for Corey to bring the goofy gags to a series of whole new—and explosive—heights.
832	13	"All Mouths Orange"	4:44	July 25, 2025	TBA
Oops, All Mouth Orange (from the clone warehouse featured in "Orcrux 3: The Warehouse") enters the kitchen and becomes acquainted with Orange and Pear… or at least Orange, given that Pear is continuously left annoyed or confused by the clone's quirks. Note: The end of the episode has a "blink-and-you'll-miss-it" disclaimer explaining that YouTube (which hosts the series' episodes) recently changed their algorithm, so if one's video is less than 8–10 minutes long, it doesn't get recommended. To comply with these new changes, the team added a repeat of "AMMUNITION ORANGE" after this one so they hit the threshold of 8–10 minutes, and hopefully YouTube doesn't suppress their video. They elaborate by stating that the production crew is small and finds the process of animation difficult to use to create long episodes quickly, as YouTube is actively suppressing videos of a few minutes presently, so they have to readjust to meet their new standards.
833	14	"Ask Orange #95: DANCING HIPPO INVASION!!!"	9:35	August 8, 2025	TBA
Orange answers questions from fans who have sent requests via the Cameo website, and gets a surprise visit from some large-and-in-charge party animals.
834	15	"Upside Down Orange"	4:18	August 22, 2025	TBA
Yet another eccentric clone from the warehouse featured in "Orcrux 3: The Warehouse" makes his debut. This particular Orange variant is impaired by the fact that his body is perpetually upside-down, leaving him with the mindset that everything that isn't upside-down is as disorienting as it would be for someone who has gone through his predicament itself, and Orange and Pear try to help turn his unfortunate situation right side-up.
835	16	"Annoying Moon"	5:22	September 5, 2025	TBA
The fate of Grapefruit's night out with the date of his dreams is jeopardized by, of all things, Orange as a moon.
836	17	"The Scare-apist"	2:44	October 3, 2025	TBA
Orange talks Pear into seeing a therapist to work out the inner stress that's troubling him. The catch? The shrink, a deformed yam by the name of Dr. Yelman—is competent and personable on the outside, but has the minor quirk of exploding into a terrifying, screaming demon at random to "help" Pear face his fears, as does Orange. Note: The title is a reference to the 2015 movie The Scarapist.
837	18	"The Haunted Mirror"	2:34	October 10, 2025	TBA
Orange jokes to Apple's annoyance. until a mysterious mirror arrives. Orange tells him that the old mirror has been re-fearbished, suggesting that spirits are possessed by old objects. He then writes a note on the mirror, explaining that it's possessed by Fred Figglehorn. He warns Apple not to look at the mirror for fun, which causes Fred to scream. Apple doesn't believe him, so he tries looking at the mirror for fun. Apple thinks the mirror doesn't believe him, and Fred screams at him, which causes Apple to crumble into a juicy pulp. Note: Footage of Fred that was used from "Annoying Orange vs. FRED!!!" was reused in that episode.
838	19	"SEXY LEGS"	3:32	October 17, 2025	TBA
Orange and Midget Apple are eating cereal and joking around when they open the cereal box to find the freebies inside. Midget Apple finds one free curse ticket from a cereal called "Scream of Wheat". On the flip side of the ticket, there's "Laughing Legs", which means that if you laugh, you'll get sexy legs. The two of them start messing around until Pear sees this and turns away.
839	20	"Scream for Ice Cream 3"	7:33	October 31, 2025	TBA
Orange is fast asleep one dark and stormy night when he is awoken by a series of eerie voices chanting the "I scream, you scream, we all scream for ice cream!" mantra. The voices lure him to a decrepit ice cream shop, where he is attacked off-screen by a legion of freaky ice cream demons. Soon enough, all of Orange's friends soon suffer the same threat of possession at the hands of the ice cream said shop is producing, and only Pear is left to fulfill the hope of ever possibly finding an end to the terrifying madness. Will he save the day in time and thwart the evil ice cream cones once and for all?
840	21	"Annoying Airlines"	6:23	November 14, 2025	TBA
Grapefruit's flight to Portland is going smoothly... until he meets the flight attendant. And the pilot. And the other passengers. And the air traffic controller. And they're all Orange!
841	22	"STANKSGIVING"	4:54	November 28, 2025	TBA
Orange and his friends chow down on some delicious food on Thanksgiving (which Pear quips is the cannibalized remains of all the foods that were killed throughout the year). When the others inquire Orange regarding his divine dish, he reveals that it's his family's quadruple-bean casserole recipe, turning the kitchen into a royal gas – and by that, we mean that it seemingly leaves next-to-everyone dead. It's up to a corncop and his cookie sidekick to decipher just what turned this quaint celebration into a full-blown holiday of horrors, with Grapefruit (the sole survivor of the quadruple – at first glance) to help recount just what occurred.
842	23	"Nuclear Football"	4:44	December 12, 2025	TBA
Orange becomes acquainted with a football that has a grim secret: he is owned by the President as his own personal missile strike button, and whenever someone punches in the correct code on his keypad, all-out annihilation begins. Always curious, Orange cracks his metaphorical knuckles and begins guessing the code through any means necessary to unlock the football's potential for explosive buffoonery. Will the world survive the fallout? Nope.
843	24	"Ask Orange #96 - The Goopiest Christmas Ever!"	12:27	December 26, 2025	TBA
Orange celebrates Christmas with zany things like a T-rex guest, holiday-themed challenges, snowmen, and three slimy ghosts riffing off of A Christmas Carol. Oh, and goop. Tons and tons of goop.

=== Season 18 (2026) ===
No. overall	No. in season	Title	Time	Original release date	Online viewers (in millions)
844	1	"2024-2025 KILLS!"	4:57	January 2, 2026	TBA
Since the series didn't have a "Kills" video for Season 16 (aka the videos released in 2024), the team decided to pack the gruesome deaths of that year and 2025's output into one video. Enjoy the carnage.
845	2	"CHICKY NUGS (Original Song)"	2:40	January 23, 2026	TBA
An original song about chicken nuggets, It also includes parody of the band name Foo Fighters.
846	3	"Annoying Orange Volcano!"	5:39	February 6, 2026	TBA
At the Science Fair, Orange poses as a volcano for his experiment. He won’t let Vinegar add anything at first and fails to impress the judges. After losing, he finally lets Vinegar add baking soda—triggering a huge, explosive eruption.
847	4	"Ask Orange #97 - Pear is Immune?!"	8:14	February 13, 2026	TBA
848	5	"AI Annoying Orange Ruined the Kitchen"	6:48	March 6, 2026	TBA
849	6	"Ask Orange #98 - Marshmallow turns Orange into a GIRL!!!"	9:33	March 20, 2026	TBA
850	7	"Ask Orange #99 - Marshmallow Venom!"	8:52	April 10, 2026	TBA
851	8	"Ask Orange #99 1/2 - 100 QUESTIONS IN 8 MINUTES!!!"	8:01	May 29, 2026	TBA
This is a highlight compilation of 100 questions from all 99 episodes of Ask Orange.
852	9	"Time to Burn (INSANE 4K REMASTER VERSION)"	3:44	June 12, 2026	TBA
This is a remake of a video originally made in 2012, with minor modifications to the scenes and details.
853	10	"THE BATHROOMS"	14:40	October 9, 2026	TBA
Orange sets a record for drinking soda but becomes intrigued by a giant can, accidentally stumbling through a mysterious doorway into a secret, bathroom-like area. Pear follows him, and they discover an old video camera before Orange uses the toilet. Flushing it summons a giant monster that hunts them. They encounter Mop, a survivor trapped since 1982, who explains that flushing causes the monster to shapeshift into the person who flushed it. As a monster disguised as Orange chases them, Pear flushes the toilet again to summon a Pear-monster. The two entities fight, allowing the group to escape. Little Apple later arrives after exiting the area himself, though he inadvertently releases the monster into the real kitchen. Note: It is a parody of The Backrooms.
854	11	"BIGGEST FAN!!!"	10:42	October 16, 2026	TBA
Orange, Pear, Midget Apple, and Grapefruit are playing with an electric fan to make Darth Vader breathing sounds. Eager to join, Orange orders a fan from "Hot Dog's Fan Emporium," but accidentally breaks a magical "One Wish Wiener" box while wishing for a biggest fan. Instead of a normal appliance, a hyper-obsessed, magically possessed "biggest fan" arrives. After trying and failing to save himself and his friends from the creepy fan, Orange uses a knife to chop it, breaking the spell and allowing everyone to happily play together. Note: It is a parody of Obsession.
855	12	"Safe Word"	8:03	October 23, 2026	TBA
Orange is writing a collection of annoying jokes when Pear enters to test him by using forbidden words, including "Banana" and "Lickly Lips." Orange warns Pear that doing so will summon a monster. Frightened, Pear accidentally blurts out homophones of the forbidden words, prompting two monsters to appear and speak to Banana and Lickly Lips was came after monsters leave. Orange instructs Pear to say the word "silence" during the forbidden word test; however, the monster startles Pear, causing her to accidentally say the word exactly as instructed.
856	13	"Scare Pear #6!"	5:53	November 6, 2026	TBA
Note: This is a leftover from Shocktober 2026, as that video is scheduled to be released on October 30, 2026.
