= List of The Temp Life episodes =

The Temp Life is an American comedy web series about a spoiled executive temping his way back up the corporate ladder. The series was created and produced by Wilson Cleveland (who stars as Nick "Trouble" Chiapetta); written by Cleveland (seasons 1–3), Yuri Baranovsky (season 4), Tony Janning and Gabe Uhr (season 5) and directed by Cleveland (season 1), Evan Ferrante (seasons 2–3), Jato Smith and Andrew Y. Park (seasons 4–5).

Overall, 43 episodes of The Temp Life were released over the course of five seasons. The first season consisted of five 3-5 minute long episodes and debuted November 29, 2006 on YouTube, Blip, MySpace, Daily Motion and Facebook. In January 2010, The Temp Life became available on demand in two million U.S. hotel rooms via LodgeNet’s DoNotDisturbTV hotel room network.

The Temp Life added an average of 85% more viewers with each season and had reached over 18 million upload views when it was announced in July 2010 that the series was renewed for a fifth season.

The fifth and final season premiered December 6, 2010 on My Damn Channel, YouTube, iTunes, MSN Video and VOD platforms like Roku and Boxee set-top boxes and Verizon Fios.

== Series overview ==
Season	Episodes	Originally released	
Season	Episodes	First released	Last released
1	5	November 29, 2006	April 16, 2006
2	7	September 13, 2008	December 21, 2008
3	5	February 9, 2009	May 14, 2009
4	14	November 15, 2009	April 25, 2010
5	8	December 3, 2010	January 23, 2011

== Episodes ==
=== Season 1 (2006-2008) ===
No. overall	No. in season	Title	Directed by	Written by	Length	Original release date
1	1	"Trouble"	Wilson Cleveland	Wilson Cleveland	4:04	November 29, 2006
When Mark gets a call from his temp agency Commodity Staffing with a job in "the fashion industry," he has no idea the kind of "trouble" he's in for. Temping for "the global leader in synthetic encasing solutions for the global footwear market" isn't exactly Fashion Week. Lace World however...
2	2	"What's in a Name?"	Wilson Cleveland	Wilson Cleveland	1:08	August 8, 2007
Laura learns Pedtastic is not a place where "everybody knows your name."
3	3	"Let Them Eat Cake"	Wilson Cleveland	Wilson Cleveland	1:54	November 14, 2007
Mark and Laura learn a valuable lesson about trust when Paul and Jen try to scam them out of 20 bucks for a birthday cake for someone they've never met.
4	4	"Make Your Own Fun"	Wilson Cleveland	Wilson Cleveland	1:52	March 28, 2008
When Commodity sends Laura back to Pedtastic for another temp job, she learns they have changed their business strategy (and their office space).
5	5	"Big Break"	Wilson Cleveland	Wilson Cleveland	1:46	April 16, 2008
Mark, an actor between gigs, is faced with the reality of his craft when Paul tries to steal his thunder.

=== Season 2 (2008) ===
No. overall	No. in season	Title	Directed by	Written by	Length	Original release date
6	1	"Mergers and Acquisitions"	Evan Ferrante	Wilson Cleveland	3:26	September 14, 2008
Following a "multi-hundred dollar" acquisition, Nick has some "Troubling" news for Paul about their future at Pedtastic but assures him the change is only "temporary."
7	2	"Help Needed"	Evan Ferrante	Wilson Cleveland	1:45	September 25, 2008
Paul shares the news of his new "temp-ness" with his slightly neurotic roommate Caitlin, who is having job search trouble of her own.
8	3	"Disorientation"	Evan Ferrante	Wilson Cleveland	3:14	October 15, 2008
When new Commodity Staffing CEO, Nick "Trouble" Chiapetta assembles his crew of hapless temps for the first time, their true personalities are put on display...a bit too soon.
9	4	"Actor on Broadway"	Evan Ferrante	Wilson Cleveland	3:12	November 10, 2008
Mark's first temp job at the new Commodity Staffing as an "actor on Broadway" isn't quite the "toe-tapping, finger-snapping" career-booster he thought it would be.
10	5	"Mykrosahft"	Evan Ferrante	Wilson Cleveland	2:59	November 24, 2008
Laura didn't think her dream of working for the "House that Bill Gates Built" included assembling its furniture too.
11	6	"Pay It Backward"	Evan Ferrante	Wilson Cleveland	4:25	December 9, 2008
When Mark and Laura confront Nick about their soul-crushing temp jobs he sent them on, they learn Nick's darkest secret and how they have been pawns in his grand plan.
12	7	"Where in the World?"	Evan Ferrante	Wilson Cleveland	3:15	December 22, 2008
Nick gets an urgent webcam message from Caitlin and Paul, who have turned up halfway around the world. Nick finally learns what "trouble" really is

=== Season 3 (2009) ===
No. overall	No. in season	Title	Directed by	Written by	Length	Original release date
13	1	"Dream Big!"	Evan Ferrante	Wilson Cleveland	2:34	February 20, 2009
Mark and Laura make a shocking discovery worthy of Save the Assistants when they return to Commodity Staffing to deliver their time sheets. Meanwhile Nick gets a visit from his guardian angel, Tom Cruise.
14	2	"Being Glib"	Evan Ferrante	Wilson Cleveland	3:45	February 27, 2009
While still unconscious, Nick dreams up a new scheme to take some completely unnecessary vacation time courtesy of his guardian angel Tom Cruise and makes a life or death decision about Commodity Staffing that will give Mark and Laura more responsibility than they want.
15	3	"Nothing Personal"	Evan Ferrante	Wilson Cleveland	2:57	March 18, 2009
With Nick taking some totally unnecessary vacation time, Mark and Laura have been handed control of Commodity Staffing, forcing them to hire new temps. They soon learn the talent pool is a bit...shallow.
16	4	"The Socialista"	Evan Ferrante	Wilson Cleveland	3:07	April 7, 2009
Commodity Staffing's newest temp, simple farm girl Shannon, is put to the test when she is forced to record every waking moment in the life of selfish "Socialista" Lindsay Sheraton, a narcissistic lifecaster with an attitude.
17	5	"City Girls"	Evan Ferrante	Wilson Cleveland	3:51	May 15, 2009
After abruptly canning her assistant, snarky lifecaster Lindsay "Socialista" Sheraton is forced to "buy a temp" to record her every mundane move for posterity. Too bad Commodity's newest farm girl temp has never seen a video camera...or a cell phone.

=== Season 4 (2009-2010) ===
No. overall	No. in season	Title	Directed by	Written by	Length	Original release date
18	1	"Here Comes Trouble"	Jato Smith and Andrew Y. Park	Yuri Baranovsky	6:17	November 15, 2009
Nick Trouble Chiapetta, an incompetent temp agency CEO returns from a self-imposed 33-week Mexican vacation to learn he's broke, unemployed and has lost his swank office space to Celltons, a cell phone button making company.
19	2	"Human Relations"	Jato Smith and Andrew Y. Park	Yuri Baranovsky	3:57	November 15, 2009
Broke and in need of a paycheck, Nick meets with Celltons touchy-feely Head of Human Relations, Stormy Simonsen in search of a job.
20	3	"Trollish"	Jato Smith and Andrew Y. Park	Yuri Baranovsky	3:05	November 22, 2009
Nick meets his new boss: Alina Deloris, head of Human Acquisitions at Celltons and learns his new 'management position' consists of transcribing painfully awkward video resumes.
21	4	"Nancy Roder"	Taryn Southern	Taryn Southern	2:55	November 23, 2009
Special guest star Taryn Southernis Nancy Roder, a hamster-loving recent grad from Oklahoma who can't wait to show off her many skills and interests working as a temp at Celltons.
22	5	"Samir Patel"	Sandeep Parikh	Sandeep Parikh	2:49	November 23, 2009
Nick reviews a video resume from USC grad Samir 'Stevie P.' Patel who is all about passion, football, headbands and the Blue Man Group.
23	6	"Cynthia and Pilar"	Wendy Rosoff and Angela Espinosa	Wendy Rosoff & Angela Espinosa	2:17	November 24, 2009
Nick must transcribe a misfiled video resume from Cynthia and Pilar (special guest stars Angela Espinosa and Wendy Rosoff), owners of west coast market researcher Groupthink who have sent Alina a request for temps through Celltons' video resume channel by mistake.
24	7	"Scott Richesen"	David Nett	David Nett	2:32	December 1, 2009
Scott Richeson may have some serious problems. Being profoundly nervous and emotionally fragile is not one of them.
25	8	"Closet Case"	Jato Smith and Andrew Y. Park	Yuri Baranovsky	3:58	December 2, 2009
With Alina watching his every move, Nick vows to ditch his new broom closet office and claw his way back up the corporate ladder.
26	9	"Office Bromance"	Jato Smith and Andrew Y. Park	Yuri Baranovsky	3:27	February 1, 2010
Nick's plan to ruin Alina begins when the profoundly unqualified Stevie P. arrives for his temp job interview.
27	10	"The Interview"	Jato Smith and Andrew Y. Park	Yuri Baranovsky	4:57	February 9, 2010
Following Nick's "career advice," Stevie P. does his best to impress Alina during his temp job interview.
28	11	"Donald's Mission"	Jato Smith and Andrew Y. Park	Yuri Baranovsky	2:37	February 15, 2010
As part of his plan to discredit Alina, Nick gives Mark a Flip camera to secretly record Donald's attempt to get Larry, Cindy and Lianne (special guest temps Joel Bryant, Taryn O'Neill and Stephanie Thorpe) to admit they hate their temp jobs.
29	12	"Touchdown!"	Jato Smith and Andrew Y. Park	Yuri Baranovsky	2:24	February 16, 2010
Laura has a crush on Pete and Mark gets an on-the-job injury courtesy of Stevie P. (Sandeep Parikh).
30	13	"No Class Action"	Jato Smith and Andrew Y. Park	Yuri Baranovsky	2:12	February 22, 2010
Nick overhears Mark threatening Stormy and Clark with a lawsuit over the "Stevie P. incident" and gleefully drop-kicks Alina under the bus.
31	14	"Going Down"	Jato Smith and Andrew Y. Park	Yuri Baranovsky	4:57	March 1, 2010
Stormy tries to keep Nick and Alina from killing each other.
32	15	"The Boss"	Jato Smith and Andrew Y. Park	Yuri Baranovsky	5:14	April 5, 2010
Everyone scrambles to impress Celltons' steely CEO, Eve Randall (special guest star Illeana Douglas) when she comes to town bearing bad news about cost-cutting.
33	16	"Coming Together"	Jato Smith and Andrew Y. Park	Yuri Baranovsky	1:56	April 12, 2010
Nick makes a last-ditch attempt to get Mark and Laura's help in getting Alina fired.
34	17	"The Hopeful"	Jato Smith and Andrew Y. Park	Yuri Baranovsky	2:35	April 19, 2010
Nick drags Nancy Roder (Taryn Southern) into his plan to bring down Alina.
35	18	"Back in Business"	Jato Smith and Andrew Y. Park	Yuri Baranovsky	5:04	April 26, 2010
Someone gets fired. Someone gets hired. Someone gets...sick.

=== Season 5 (2010-2011) ===
No. overall	No. in season	Title	Directed by	Written by	Length	Original release date
36	1	"We're Number Two!"	Jato Smith and Andrew Y. Park	Tony Janning and Gabe Uhr	4:35	December 6, 2010
Nick's (Wilson Cleveland) half brother, Eddie (Craig Bierko) becomes his boss and joins forces with Eve Randall (Illeana Douglas) to push him out of the company.
37	2	"The Sum of All Phones"	Jato Smith and Andrew Y. Park	Tony Janning and Gabe Uhr	4:53	December 13, 2010
Nick hires Thomas Clancy (Mark Gantt), the most obvious corporate spy in the history of corporate spies.
38	3	"The Other Roder"	Jato Smith and Andrew Y. Park	Tony Janning and Gabe Uhr	6:01	December 20, 2010
Nancy Roder's (Taryn Southern) twin sister Tammy (Jessica Rose) comes for a job interview.
39	4	"Sensitivity Training"	Jato Smith and Andrew Y. Park	Tony Janning and Gabe Uhr	5:41	December 27, 2010
The temps undergo corporate sensitivity training led by Counselor Rick (Tony Janning), a motivational speaker on the verge of a nervous breakdown.
40	5	"The Hungover"	Jato Smith and Andrew Y. Park	Tony Janning and Gabe Uhr	4:30	January 3, 2011
After a disastrous sensitivity training session, Nick drags the temps to a karaoke bar to blow off some steam.
41	6	"Law & Lunch Order"	Jato Smith and Andrew Y. Park	Tony Janning and Gabe Uhr	6:22	January 10, 2011
Cook (Milo Ventimiglia) the office lunch cart guy, teams up with Nick to catch a pastrami sandwich thief.
42	7	"Nick's Last Stand"	Jato Smith and Andrew Y. Park	Tony Janning and Gabe Uhr	4:04	January 17, 2011
Cook (Milo Ventimiglia) gives Nick a pep talk to help him deal with various plots unfolding against him. Nancy Roder (Taryn Southern)and Stevie P. (Sandeep Parikh) say an awkward goodbye.
43	8	"Return of the Eddie"	Jato Smith and Andrew Y. Park	Tony Janning and Gabe Uhr	4:10	January 23, 2011
Series finale. Eddie and Eve (Craig Bierko and Illeana Douglas) gather the troops for Nick's final humiliation.
