= 2016 Webby Awards =

US internet awards ceremony

The 20th annual Webby Awards for 2016 was held at Cipriani Wall Street in New York City on May 16, 2016, which was hosted by comedian and actor Nick Offerman. The awards ceremony was streamed live on the Webby Awards website. Judges from the International Academy of Digital Arts and Sciences picked the over one hundred winners, which may or may not match the people's choice. The Webby for Lifetime Achievement was awarded to The Onion, having earned over 39 Webbys for its humor over the past 20 years.

== Nominees and winners ==
(from http://webbyawards.com/winners/2016/)

| Category | Webby Award winner | People's Voice winner | Other nominees |
|---|---|---|---|
| Webby Lifetime Achievement | The Onion for humor | | |
| Webby Special Achievement | Lena Dunham & Jennifer Konner for Lenny Letter | | |
| Webby Artist of the Year | Kanye West | | |
| Webby Entrepreneur of the Year | Jessica Alba | | |
| Webby Agency of the Year | R/GA | | |
| Webby Break The Internet Award | Kim Kardashian | | |
| Webby Social Movement of the Year | Black Lives Matter | | |
| Webby Outstanding Comedic Performance | Chelsea Peretti | | |
| Webby Best Actress | Krysten Ritter | | |
| Webby Film & Video Breakout of the Year | Making a Murderer | | |
| Best Game | | Google Feud | Lyderia.no |
| Best Writing | Last Week Tonight with John Oliver | Last Week Tonight with John Oliver | |
| Best Productivity App | Pocket | Pocket | |
| Best Streaming Video App | HBO Now | HBO Now | |
| Mobile & Apps: Games | Her Story | Two Dots | |
| Best Government & Civil Innovation Website | NASA | NASA | |
| Best Overall Social Presence | Game of Thrones | The Tonight Show Starring Jimmy Fallon | |
| Best Entertainment | The Tonight Show Starring Jimmy Fallon | The Tonight Show Starring Jimmy Fallon | |
| Drama: Individual Short or Episode | Spin | | |
| Drama: Long Form or Series | The Skinny | Star Trek Continues | |
This table is incomplete, please help to complete it from material on this page.
