= Kept Man =

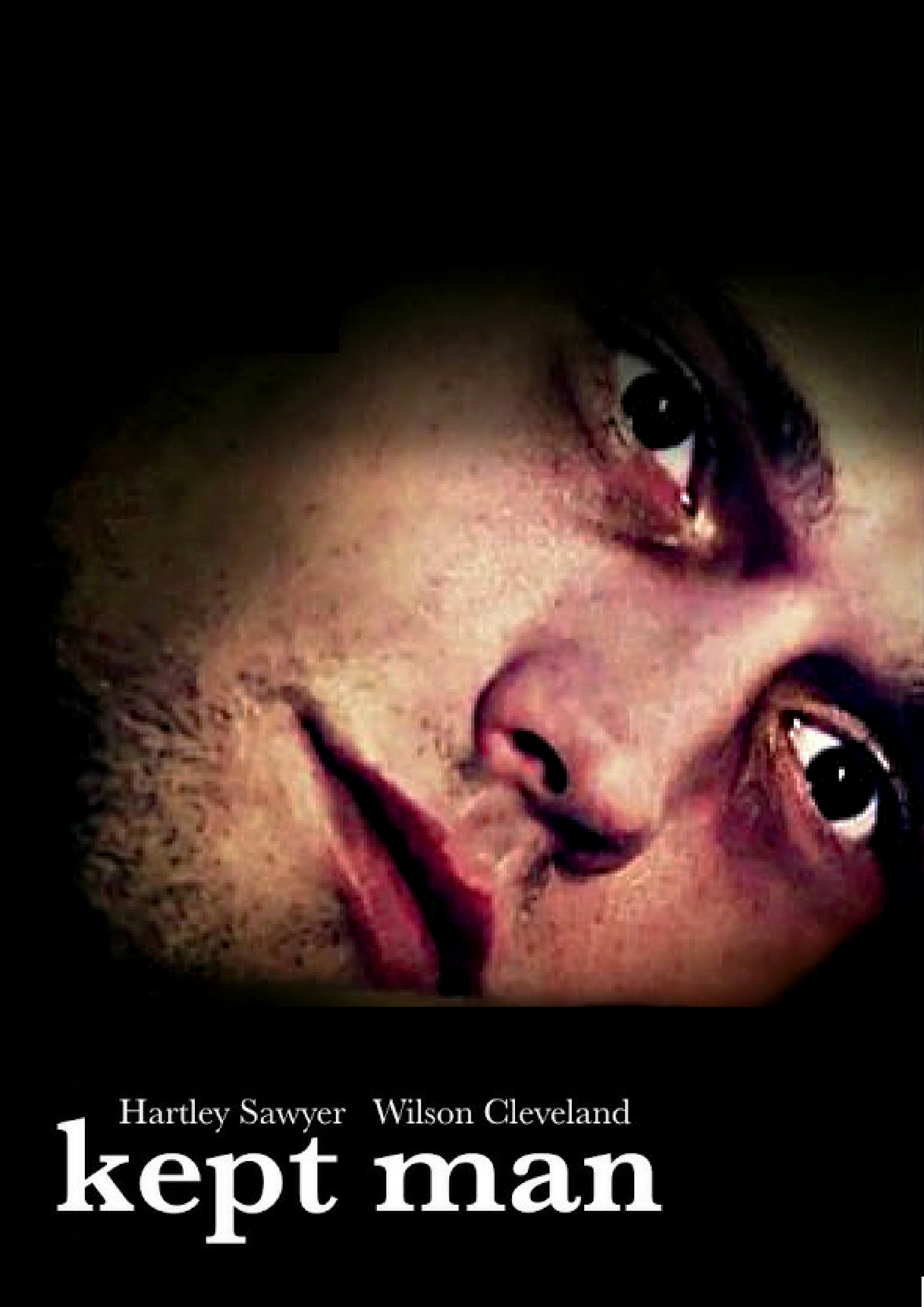
- Digital release poster
- Directed by: Brett Annese
- Screenplay by: Wilson Cleveland
- Produced by: Patrick T. Rousseau; Brett Annese
- Starring: Wilson Cleveland; Hartley Sawyer
- Cinematography: Matthew Moroughan
- Edited by: Nathaniel Wixon
- Music by: Brett Annese
- Production companies: Unboxd Media; Iris MediaWorks
- Distributed by: Amazon Prime; Vimeo on Demand; YouTube
- Release date: October 31, 2014
- Running time: 12 minutes
- Country: United States
- Language: English

Kept Man is a 2014 short film suspense drama directed by Brett Annese and written by Wilson Cleveland, who also stars in the film. The film, set in Los Angeles, is a two-hander that depicts the intense relationship between Cleveland's character Jake and his new boyfriend, Brian, played by Hartley Sawyer, who is slowly losing his grip on reality.

The film was released for Halloween on October 31, 2014 on YouTube. A second cut of the film, featuring three additional scenes was released for Valentine's Day on February 14, 2015, on Amazon Prime Video and Vimeo On Demand.

== Cast ==
- Wilson Cleveland as Jake
- Hartley Sawyer as Brian

== Reception ==
Kept Man received a range of reviews from critics. Joseph Ehrman-Dupre of IndieWire described it as "moody, mysterious, and shocking," noting that while the film's twist is anticipated, it still has an impact. Evan DeSimone of NewMediaRockstars commented on the film's structure, indicating it was designed to keep viewers off balance.

The film also won a 2015 Webby Award for Individual Short (Drama) from the International Academy of Digital Arts and Sciences on May 19, 2015.
