= Suite 7 =

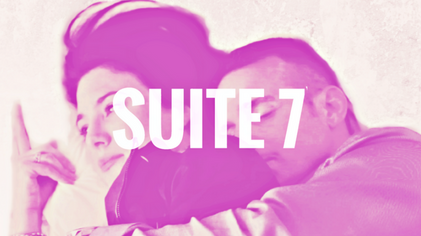
- Title card
- Genre: Comedy drama
- Created by: Wilson Cleveland
- Starring: Wilson Cleveland; Craig Bierko; Henry Dittman; Shannen Doherty; Illeana Douglas; Brian Austin Green; Marc Hustvedt; Tony Janning; Eddie McClintock; Brandon Molale; Jaime Murray; George Newbern; Tara Perry; Milo Ventimiglia; Alexi Wasser; Nicky Whelan
- Composers: Elon Arbiture; Joseph Trapanese; Woody Pak
- Country of origin: United States
- Original language: English
- No. of seasons: 1
- No. of episodes: 8

Production
- Production location: Los Angeles
- Cinematography: Kurt Iswarienko; John Schmidt; Ulf Soderqvist
- Camera setup: Single-camera
- Running time: 6–10 minutes

Original release
- Network: Lifetime; Hulu
- Release: December 13, 2010 – January 28, 2011

Suite 7 is an American limited anthology series created and executive produced by Wilson Cleveland. who also stars as Matthew Brandon. The series, presented by Better Sleep Council and distributed by A&E Networks, debuted on December 17, 2010 on MyLifetime.com and Lifetime’s Hulu, YouTube, iTunes and Xbox channels.

== Premise ==
The series is set inside a single suite of a fictional hotel located in Valencia, California outside Los Angeles. Each episode tells a standalone story from different writers and directors that focus on the relationship between two characters. Some episodes are comedic and others are more dramatic. Wilson Cleveland plays Matthew, the hotel manager and main character in the frame story, who interacts with the eclectic guests who check in throughout the series.

== Reception ==
Suite 7 received 200,000 streams in its first two weeks of release and received generally favorable reviews from critics.

In his January 14, 2011 New York Times review, critic Mike Hale wrote Suite 7 was “worth checking out,” singling out the episode ‘’Good in Bed’’ starring Jaime Murray and Eddie McClintock as a divorcing couple as “the best so far.” Jim Edwards of CBS News called Shannen Doherty’s performance “jarringly emotional” and observed that series stars Illeana Douglas, Milo Ventimiglia and Brian Austin Green “seem to be having a ball and delivering performances of a far higher quality than they have often done on regular TV.” GigaOm writer Liz Shannon Miller wrote in her January 5, 2011 review, “There’s a theatrical feel to the bulk of the series, which is one way of saying that the plotting feels a little slight at times, with many episodes representing nice illustrations of scene work as opposed to engaging storytelling.”

The International Academy of Digital Arts and Sciences honored Shannen Doherty and Wilson Cleveland with a 2012 Webby Award for Individual Performance and the series was nominated for Best Online Program - Drama at the 2011 Banff World Media Festival.

== Episodes ==
No.	Title	Directed by	Written by	Original release date
1	"Guest Disservices"	Paul Lindsay	Wilson Cleveland	December 13, 2010
At the end of a long shift, hotel night manager Matthew Brandon (Wilson Cleveland) is told he must cover yet another 12 hours. Sleep deprived, Matthew’s patience is pushed to the limit by Russell (Marc Hustvedt), a spoiled guest demanding an upgrade to the hotel's most-popular suite: Suite 7.
2	"Good in Bed"	Mark Gantt	Susan Miller	December 17, 2010
When Jessy (Jaime Murray) shows up with final divorce papers to Michael's (Eddie McClintock) hotel room, where he's been holing up to avoid signing, they end up doing what they were always good at, the one thing they always achieved in perfect harmony and bliss -- they take a nap.
3	"Soulmates"	Michael Kang	Illeana Douglas	December 22, 2010
It's the middle of the night. Livvy (Illeana Douglas) and Max (Henry Dittman), two actors doing a film together can no longer resist the temptation of an off screen love affair. While Livvy and Max try to keep their romantic ideals about true love the couple next store with their wild antics becomes so distracting it makes them rethink their entire romantic escapade.
4	"For Richer or Poorer"	Sandeep Parikh	Tony Janning; Sandeep Parikh	December 31, 2010
Thanks to a sudden spike of income, newlyweds Vincent (Tony Janning) and Melanie (Tara Perry) find out on the night of their wedding just how very little they actually know about each other.
5	"That Guy"	Milo Ventimiglia	Russ Cundiff; Dean DeMilio	January 7, 2011
Best Man Milo Ventimiglia has exactly 24 hours to convince groom-to-be Brandon Molale that he's about to marry the wrong girl. Also starring Wilson Cleveland and Nicky Whelan.
6	"Captive Audience"	Shannen Doherty	Wilson Cleveland	January 14, 2011
Struggling screenwriter Cole (Brian Austin Green) has kidnapped Kate (Alexi Wasser), a popular young actress in hopes of getting her to star in his movie. Convincing Kate he's the world's best writer is not as easy as convincing her he's the world's worst kidnapper.
7	"Supermen"	Michael Kang	Craig Bierko	January 21, 2011
How can Gil (George Newbern) ask his longtime colleague and fellow road warrior Wil (Craig Bierko) to have his midlife crisis somewhere other than his hotel room so he can get some sleep?
8	"Company"	Mark Gantt	Yuri Baranovsky	January 28, 2011
Adrienne (Shannen Doherty), an emotional hotel guest coping with loss, and Matthew (Wilson Cleveland), an aloof hotel manager, find comfort in each other's company.
