= Easy to Assemble =

American comedy series by Illeana Douglas

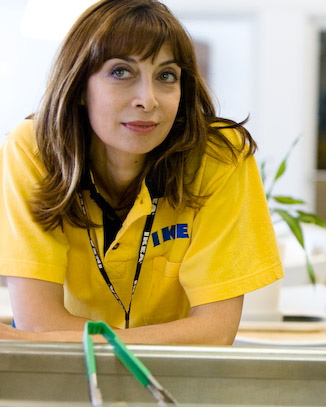
- Illeana Douglas in Easy to Assemble
- Genre: Comedy
- Created by: Illeana Douglas
- Written by: Illeana Douglas
- Directed by: Chris Bradley; Kyle LaBrache; Greg Pritikin; Michael Kang; Melanie Mayron; Illeana Douglas
- Starring: Illeana Douglas; Jeff Goldblum; Keanu Reeves; Jane Lynch; Justine Bateman; Tim Meadows; Cheri Oteri; Tom Arnold; Ed Begley Jr. Kevin Pollak; Fred Willard; Daryl Sabara; Ricki Lake; David Henrie; Patricia Heaton; Hannah Cowley; Eric Lange; Roger Bart; Kate Micucci; Wilson Cleveland; Jay DeMarcus; Laraine Newman; Craig Bierko; Allan Havey; Greg Proops; Sean Durrie
- Theme music composer: Rob Mailhouse, Todd Spahr, Illeana Douglas
- Composers: Robert Mailhouse; Todd Spahr; Illeana Douglas
- Country of origin: United States
- Original language: English
- No. of seasons: 4
- No. of episodes: 48

Production
- Executive producers: Thomas Bannister SXM inc, Barney Oldfield, Alia Kemet, Magnus Gustafsson
- Producers: Illeana Douglas, Dominik Rausch; Lindsey Grad (assist); Dominik Rausch, Richard Devenki (line)

Original release
- Release: 2008

Easy to Assemble is a web series created by and starring Illeana Douglas, and sponsored by furniture store IKEA.

Douglas plays a fictional version of herself trying to quit acting and work a "real job" at the IKEA store in Burbank, California. She soon finds she cannot leave Hollywood behind when fellow actress Justine Bateman starts an internet talk show called "40 and Bitter" on the floor of IKEA.

The series has had several notable guest stars, including Jeff Goldblum, Keanu Reeves, Jane Lynch, Justine Bateman, Tim Meadows, Cheri Oteri, Tom Arnold, Ed Begley Jr., Kevin Pollak, Fred Willard, Daryl Sabara, Wilson Cleveland, Ricki Lake, David Henrie, Patricia Heaton, Michael Hitchcock, and Eric Lange.

== Awards and recognition ==
The series has won numerous advertising and creative awards. Ad Week magazine awarded Easy to Assemble one of the top five "Best Branded Deals" of 2010. In that same year, Easy to Assemble was nominated for seven "Streamy" awards winning "Best Ensemble Cast" and "Best Product Integration." It also picked up a nomination for "Best Individual Performance" for Illeana Douglas at the 14th Annual Webby Awards, and won two Webbys: "Best Branded Content", and "Best Comedy Episode" for its spin-off series Spärhusen. Additionally, Douglas received the ITV Fest 2010 Innovator Award and the 2010 "Best Online Performance Award" from the 2010 Banff World TV Fest. Easy to Assemble and IKEA were also honored to receive the 2010 NATPE "Digital Luminary Award". In 2012, the series was twice a Webby Honoree for Individual Performance and Best Writing. In 2013 Easy to Assemble was a Webby Honoree for Best Individual Performance for the episode "This Side Up".
