= SXM inc =

SXM
- Type: Private company
- Industry: Branded Entertainment
- Founded: 2008 (New York City as SXM)
- Founder: Thomas Bannister
- Headquarters: New York, NY, United States
- Area served: North America
- Key people: Thomas Bannister (Founder and CEO); Larry Laboe (President of Production)
- Website: www.sxm.co

SXM is a digital studio and marketing agency which has worked with brands including Disney, NBC, CBS, Comedy Central, IKEA, Samsung, Coca-Cola and Smuckers. SXM series have been viewed more than 500 million times, and have garnered multiple awards at the BANFF, NATPE and Webbys. SXM has been profiled by publications such as Fast Company. Series include SOS Island, CTRL, Fact Checkers Unit, Easy to Assemble, Matumbo Goldberg, Kitchen Jam, Diagnosis Stories and Extreme Retreat.

SXM has offices in New York City and Los Angeles.

== Work ==
=== Online series ===
SXM created the online series Easy To Assemble in 2008. The series was sponsored and set within IKEA, and starred actors including Jeff Goldblum, Jane Lynch, Craig Bierko, Robert Patrick and Tom Arnold. The series was one of the first brand funded series on YouTube and the earliest example of celebrity participation.

Other branded entertainment work included the first network digital series - NBC's CTRL, starring Tony Hale, and the Webby-nominated Fact Checkers Unit, which ushered in the era of the Galaxy Phone line. More recent branded entertainment productions include SXM's SOS Island, a social media survivor show sponsored by Samsung and filmed in the Caribbean.

SXM has done much work in the original digital content sphere, creating and producing VEVO's The Comment Show, starring Jimmy Tatro; Dailymotion's first half-hour series Jump Outs; Armed Response with Defy Media; and Matumbo Goldberg, starring Anthony Anderson and Jenna Elfman and produced with Comedy Central.

==== Commercials ====
SXM created long form celebrity YouTube commercials with the James Franco/Samsung spots for the Galaxy Tab and camera.

=== Television ===
In 2011 SXM moved into television with the production of Matumbo Goldberg for Comedy Central. Fact Checkers Unit was broadcast on SYFY worldwide and SOS Island episodes on Xbox.
