= Leap Year (web series) =

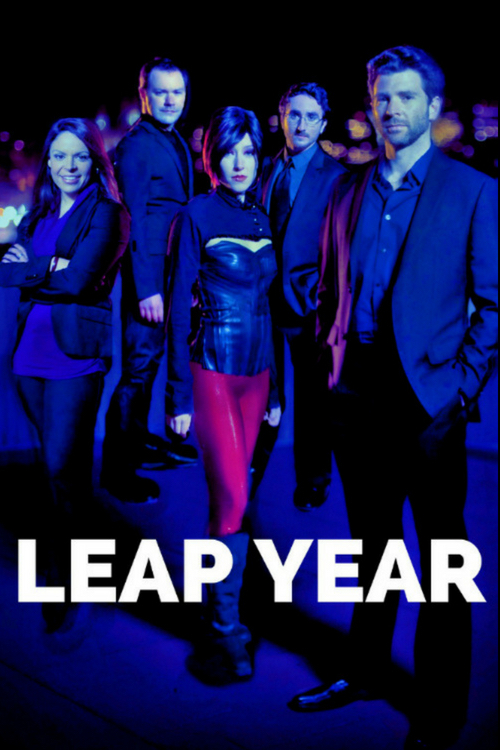
- Poster image
- Genre: Comedy drama
- Created by: Wilson Cleveland; Yuri Baranovsky; Vlad Baranovsky
- Directed by: Yuri Baranovsky
- Starring: Wilson Cleveland; Alexis Boozer Sterling; Yuri Baranovsky; Daniela DiIorio; Drew Lanning; Rachel Risen; Craig Bierko; Emma Caulfield; Eliza Dushku; Mark Gantt; Joshua Malina; Dustin Toshiyuki; Julie Warner; Steven Weber
- Country of origin: United States
- No. of seasons: 2
- No. of episodes: 20

Production
- Producers: Wilson Cleveland; Yuri Baranovsky; Vlad Baranovsky; Justin Morrison; Dashiell Reinhardt; Garrett Law; Eliza Dushku (season 2)
- Production location: San Francisco
- Cinematography: Justin Morrison
- Camera setup: Single-camera
- Running time: 15–25 minutes
- Production companies: Happy Little Guillotine; Universal Cable Productions

Original release
- Network: Hulu; YouTube; USA Network
- Release: June 6, 2011 – August 20, 2012

Leap Year is an American comedy-drama web series created and executive produced by Wilson Cleveland and Yuri Baranovsky, who also star as brothers Derek and Aaron Morrison. The series, sponsored by Hiscox, about five former co-workers starting a tech company, debuted June 6, 2011, on Hulu and YouTube. The first season had received 3.7 million streams as of February 29, 2012, when it was announced the series had been renewed for a second season, which premiered on June 18, 2012.

== Reception ==
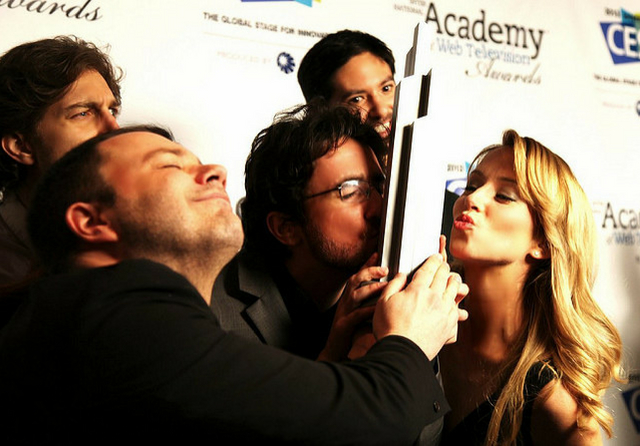
Leap Year cast at the 2013 IAWTV Awards

The series received generally favorable reviews from critics. TheWrap's John Sellers called Leap Year "a well-wrought online comedy," adding that while the series was sponsored by a brand, "even those who are cynical about such matters should laugh at the show." Forbes contributor Jesse Thomas titled his August 9, 2011 review "Leap Year: The Web Series Every Entrepreneur Should Watch" and New York Observer tech writer Jessica Roy noted, "The show follows the ups (but mostly downs) of building a startup, with a wry comedic voice and plenty of inside jokes for the tech set." In his August 1, 2012 review, television critic Keith McDuffee wrote, "I’m not sure I care about any of these characters enough. I struggle to see what anyone sees in Aaron besides that he's apparently good in business. Aaron's brother, Derek (Wilson Cleveland) doesn't yet have a meaty enough role to latch onto, and Olivia (Daniela DiIorio) is almost right up there with how I feel about Aaron: lots of negative vibes."

The International Academy of Digital Arts and Sciences honored Leap Year with the 2012 Webby Award for Best Online Series. The series also received Streamy and Banff World Media Festival Awards for Best Branded Entertainment Series and the IAWTV Award for Best Dramatic Series at CES in 2013.

== Plot ==
=== Season 1 (2011) ===
After being laid-off from their corporate day jobs, Aaron, Bryn, Derek, Olivia and Jack compete to get their businesses off the ground when a mystery benefactor promises to invest $500,000 in one of their startups.

=== Season 2 (2012) ===
Six months have passed since Aaron, Bryn, Derek, Olivia and Jack won half a million dollars by banding together to create a holographic video conferencing platform called C3D. Now living in Silicon Valley with launch day approaching, the founders of C3D are beset by a mysterious series of setbacks.

== Cast and characters ==
=== Main cast ===
- Wilson Cleveland as Derek Morrison, Aaron's older half brother and one of C3D's original founders. A series of events involving a lawsuit sees Derek betray his friends in return for the lawsuit being dismissed.
- Alexis Boozer Sterling as Bryn Arbor, a brilliant coder and C3D's sardonic Chief Technology Officer. Bryn developed C3D's holographic video technology and built the prototype from scratch. Bryn shuns the spotlight but as a virtue of her talents cannot fully escape it. She would rather spend hours tinkering away with headphones on, not talking to anybody. She is the type of person who wears a spiked collar so she can stab people in the face when they hug her.
- Yuri Baranovsky as Aaron Morrison, CFO at C3D, Aaron is married to Lisa and struggles with the demanding schedule of starting a company. Aaron is the voice of reason behind Jack's insanity.
- Daniela DiIorio as Olivia Reddox, C3D's acerbic chief marketing officer, whose short temper leads her to quit C3D until she meets Sam Berry, an enigmatic stranger who motivates her to reconsider her resignation and rejoin the team.
- Drew Lanning as Jack Sather, C3D's CEO who is obsessed with the idea of becoming an iconic, Steve Jobsian leader, but cannot get out of his own way.
- Rachel Risen as Lisa Morrison, Aaron's long-suffering wife.

=== Recurring ===
- Craig Bierko as Andy Corvell, CEO of Corvell Corporation and C3D's angel investor. He fires Aaron, Bryn, Derek, Jack and Olivia then challenges them to a business contest worth half a million dollars for one winner.
- Julie Warner as Josie Lanning, an attorney who advises C3D. She helps Derek settle the harassment lawsuit brought against him when he jokingly threatens to fire his Mormon assistant for not letting him buy her a drink.
- Dustin Toshiyuki as Glenn Cheeky, C3D's 20-year-old genius lead investor and former protege of Andy Corvell.
- Eliza Dushku as June Pepper (season 2), MIT graduate and expert hacker. She is recruited by Andy Corvell to sabotage C3D's launch announcement, empty the company bank account and blackmail Derek into sharing C3D information with Livefye.
- Joshua Malina as Sam Berry (season 2), a well-known Silicon Valley entrepreneur who's dating Olivia and ultimately helps her defeat Andy Corvell.
- Steven Weber as Detective Remy Doyle (season 2), an SJPD detective. He arrests and interrogates Bryn after she handcuffs June Pepper in a coat closet and makes a video death threat against Andy Corvell.
- Emma Caulfield as Smiley (season 2), an over-zealous private investigator. She is hired by Aaron and Derek to find intel on those responsible for breaking into the C3D office and stealing the prototypes.
- Shira Lazar as herself (season 2), host of What's Trending who conducts Jack's disastrous live interview about C3D's launch date.
- Mark Gantt as Sergei Lenov (season 1), a reclusive Russian programmer who lives in a remote cabin. He helps Bryn finish the C3D prototype.
- Kim Fitzgerald as Scarlett Lane (season 1), an author who becomes Jack's first client and then his girlfriend. She breaks up with him after he steals Adam Ostrow's contact info and drops her name to get Olivia's post on Mashable.
- Lillie Morrisson as Matilda (season 2), Jack and Aaron's college friend seen in flashback. She tries to break up Aaron and Lisa at a campus Valentine's Day party.
- Alexis Ohanian as himself (season 2), Reddit co-founder who gives Jack, Aaron and Bryn advice on how to win the Techstars contest.
- Guy Kawasaki as himself (season 1), Scarlett's friend
- Rachel Sklar as herself (season 2), Techstars contest advisor and Bryn's girl crush.
- Gary Vaynerchuk as himself (season 1), New Yorker who tells Olivia on "nobody says thank you in business."
- Dave Tisch as himself (season 2), Head of Techstars NY who hears C3D pitch from Jack, Aaron and Bryn.
- Adam Ostrow as himself (season 1), Mashable Editor-in-Chief who accepts Olivia's guest post about Aaron.
- Ryan Lawler as himself (season 2), TechCrunch reporter who covers the C3D launch event.
- Douglas McMillan as himself (season 2), Businessweek tech reporter who covers the C3D launch event.
- Drew Baldwin as Chuck (season 2), Derek's boyfriend.

== Episodes ==
=== Season 1 (2011) ===
No.	Title	Directed by	Written by	Runtime (minuets)	Original release date
1	"All Hands"	Yuri Baranovsky	Vlad Baranovsky & Yuri Baranovsky	8:50	June 6, 2011
Rumored layoffs overshadow Aaron's surprise birthday party. Jack tries to convince Aaron, his brother Derek and their friend Olivia (Daniela DiIorio), that getting laid off may not be as awful as it seems.
2	"Released"	Yuri Baranovsky	Vlad Baranovsky & Yuri Baranovsky	10:19	June 13, 2011
Jack, Bryn, Olivia, Derek and Aaron face uncertainty about their future as CEO, Andy Corvell (guest star Craig Bierko) calls an all-hands meeting. With lay-offs looming, tensions rise and the group wonders, if they do get fired - what's next?
3	"A Simple Contest"	Yuri Baranovsky	Vlad Baranovsky & Yuri Baranovsky	7:56	June 20, 2011
Newly laid-off, Jack, Aaron, Derek, Olivia and Bryn are recruited to participate in a mysterious business contest with a $500k prize. In the meantime, Jack tries desperately to convince popular novelist, Scarlett Lane to be his first client.
4	"Used People Salesman"	Yuri Baranovsky	Vlad Baranovsky & Yuri Baranovsky	8:18	June 27, 2011
Jack's business relationship with his only client, novelist Scarlett Lane moves from professional to sexual. In the meantime, Olivia, struggling to find any client, hires Jack to help her market her only product -- herself.
5	"Nothing Personal"	Yuri Baranovsky	Vlad Baranovsky & Yuri Baranovsky	9:57	July 4, 2011
Olivia tries to decide whether betraying her close friend, Aaron is worth a potential boost to her personal business.
6	"That Kind of Day"	Yuri Baranovsky	Vlad Baranovsky & Yuri Baranovsky	7:12	July 11, 2011
The office server goes missing and Bryn faces a crisis of conscience and identity. Aaron, furious over Olivia's and Jack's betrayal, unleashes the full fury of a financial analyst.
7	"Corporate Cupid"	Yuri Baranovsky	Vlad Baranovsky & Yuri Baranovsky	8:36	July 19, 2011
Derek (Wilson Cleveland) gets slapped with a lawsuit and seeks help from attorney Josie Lanning (guest star Julie Warner). Jack loses his only client and most of his friends. Also guest starring Teri Reeves.
8	"Five Roads"	Yuri Baranovsky	Vlad Baranovsky & Yuri Baranovsky	9:14	July 25, 2011
Jack has a plan to win the contest and save his friends' businesses. The problem? No one trusts him, no one likes him, and "friends" has become a very loose term.
9	"Kind of a Genius"	Yuri Baranovsky	Vlad Baranovsky & Yuri Baranovsky	10:23	August 1, 2011
Jack tries to win Scarlett back with some help from Guy Kawasaki
10	"Life in 3D"	Yuri Baranovsky	Vlad Baranovsky & Yuri Baranovsky	12:49	August 8, 2011
Lisa goes into labor while she, Aaron, Bryn and Derek visit programming genius, Sergei Lenov (guest star Mark Gantt) at his cabin in the woods. With hours left, the gang tries desperately to get the final pieces together to present their new plan to their mysterious investor.

=== Season 2 (2012) ===
No.	Title	Directed by	Written by	Runtime (minuets)	Original release date
11	"A Train Wreck"	Yuri Baranovsky	Vlad Baranovsky & Yuri Baranovsky	17:34	June 18, 2012
Jack goes missing after an encounter with June Pepper (guest star Eliza Dushku) an hour before he's supposed to announce C3D's launch date live on What's Trending with Shira Lazar
12	"One of Those Nights"	Yuri Baranovsky	Vlad Baranovsky & Yuri Baranovsky	19:10	June 25, 2012
Aaron and Derek retain the services of Smiley (guest star Emma Caulfield) to find those responsible for breaking into the C3D office and stealing the prototypes.
13	"Of All the Gin Joints"	Yuri Baranovsky	Vlad Baranovsky & Yuri Baranovsky	17:14	July 2, 2012
Olivia suffers a crisis of confidence in herself and C3D until she meets the "Freezer King," Sam Berry (guest star Joshua Malina).
14	"Just Trying to Survive"	Yuri Baranovsky	Vlad Baranovsky & Yuri Baranovsky	16:03	July 9, 2012
Derek (Wilson Cleveland) crumbles from personal and financial pressure after a chance encounter with his attorney Josie Lanning (guest star Julie Warner) and June Pepper (guest star Eliza Dushku) is there to help him pick up the pieces with an offer he can't refuse.
15	"The Very Idea of Loving Love"	Yuri Baranovsky	Vlad Baranovsky & Yuri Baranovsky	19:49	July 16, 2012
With help from their investor Glenn Cheeky; Aaron, Bryn and Jack are accepted to the Techstars NY startup accelerator, where they get some advice from guest star Alexis Ohanian. Derek and Olivia continue looking for evidence to use against Livefye.
16	"What It Takes to Win"	Yuri Baranovsky	Vlad Baranovsky & Yuri Baranovsky	18:39	July 23, 2012
Aaron struggles with guilt over his indiscretion with Bryn. Sam Berry's (guest star Joshua Malina) true identity is revealed and it hits too close to home for Olivia.
17	"A Moment of Weakness"	Yuri Baranovsky	Vlad Baranovsky & Yuri Baranovsky	15:32	July 30, 2012
Bryn taunts herself over her behavior with Aaron after being confronted by his wife Lisa. Derek is fired for spying for Livefye.
18	"Behind the Hologram"	Yuri Baranovsky	Vlad Baranovsky & Yuri Baranovsky	17:04	August 6, 2012
Bryn takes drastic measures against an old enemy and is arrested by Detective Remy Doyle (guest star Steven Weber).
19	"What We're Capable Of"	Yuri Baranovsky	Vlad Baranovsky & Yuri Baranovsky	24:31	August 13, 2012
June Pepper (guest star Eliza Dushku) reveals the name of C3D's true enemy. Aaron, Bryn, Derek, Olivia and Jack prepare for war with an old nemesis. Sam Berry (guest star Joshua Malina) woos Olivia back.
20	"How to Bite"	Yuri Baranovsky	Vlad Baranovsky & Yuri Baranovsky	22:12	August 20, 2012
At the C3D launch event, Aaron, Bryn, Derek, Olivia and Jack band together with Detective Remy Doyle (guest star Steven Weber) to teach Andy Corvell (guest star Craig Bierko) a lesson once and for all.
