= Courageous Leaders =

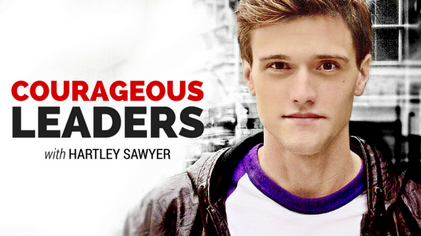
- Genre: Docuseries
- Created by: Wilson Cleveland
- Written by: Wilson Cleveland; Hartley Sawyer
- Directed by: Noah Workman
- Starring: Hartley Sawyer
- Opening theme: "Animals" by The Relay Company
- Country of origin: United States
- Original language: English
- No. of seasons: 1
- No. of episodes: 6

Production
- Producers: Wilson Cleveland; Patrick T. Rousseau

Original release
- Network: Vox; The Verge; SB Nation; Curbed
- Release: June 1, 2015

Courageous Leaders is an American web television docuseries created by Executive Producer, Wilson Cleveland and hosted by Hartley Sawyer. The series, presented by Hiscox and distributed by Vox Media debuted on June 1, 2015 on Vox, The Verge, SB Nation and Curbed.

== Premise ==
In each episode, host Hartley Sawyer profiles a different entrepreneur who recounts their personal and professional experiences with overcoming fear, taking risks and handling failure.

== Episodes ==
| No. | Title | Directed by | Written by | Original release date |
|---|---|---|---|---|
| 1 | "Think YOUR Publicist is Fearless?" | Noah Workman | Wilson Cleveland; Hartley Sawyer | June 1, 2015 |
Why would PR maven Jocelyn Johnson start a firm with less than a month's rent in her bank account and zero clients? Five words: "Fear is a death trap."
| 2 | "Adam Mariucci is Literally a Real Estate Rock Star" | Noah Workman | Wilson Cleveland; Hartley Sawyer | June 1, 2015 |
Musician turned real estate power broker Adam Mariucci shares his tips for handling rejection like a boss and finding the courage to keep moving.
| 3 | "Why Interior Designer Ross Cassidy Always Carries a Trampoline" | Noah Workman | Wilson Cleveland; Hartley Sawyer | June 1, 2015 |
Hear how interior designer Ross Cassidy bounced from dollar draft bartender to Million Dollar Decorator.
| 4 | "How Ben Lerer Found the Courage to Evolve" | Noah Workman | Wilson Cleveland; Hartley Sawyer | June 1, 2015 |
How Group Nine Media CEO, Ben Lerer is mastering the art of evolution and why after a decade, he's still having fun.
| 5 | "The Tao of Bethany Lyons" | Noah Workman | Wilson Cleveland; Hartley Sawyer | June 1, 2015 |
Power Yogi and Founder of Lyons Den Power Yoga, Bethany Lyons gets you out of your head and onto the mat to unleash the courage within.
| 6 | "How Foursquare's Dennis Crowley Tinkered a Bad Week Into 50 Million Users" | Noah Workman | Wilson Cleveland; Hartley Sawyer | June 1, 2015 |
Getting laid off and evicted in the same week would be discouraging for most people. But Foursquare Co-founder Dennis Crowley isn't most people.
