= Battleground (American TV series) =

2010s American mockumentary television series

- Genre: Mockumentary; Comedy drama
- Created by: J. D. Walsh
- Starring: Jay Hayden; Teri Reeves; Jack DeSena; Ben Samuel; Lindsey Payne; Jordan T. Maxwell; Alison Haislip; Meighan Gerachis; Sam White
- Country of origin: United States
- Original language: English
- No. of seasons: 1
- No. of episodes: 13

Production
- Executive producers: J. D. Walsh; Hagai Shaham; Marc Webb
- Camera setup: Single-camera
- Running time: 19–23 minutes (TV series); 27–34 minutes (podcast)
- Production companies: West High Drama, LLC

Original release
- Network: Hulu
- Release: February 14 – May 8, 2012
- Release: December 2, 2017 – June 21, 2018

Battleground is a mockumentary comedy-drama television series created by J. D. Walsh streamed on Hulu. The show follows a group of political campaign staffers working to elect a dark horse candidate to the U.S. Senate in the battleground state of Wisconsin. Walsh serves as executive producer alongside Hagai Shaham and Marc Webb.

The series marked Hulu's first venture into original scripted programming and premiered online on February 14, 2012.

In December 2017, it was announced that the series was being revived as a podcast by UK 3's The World At Large series. The first three episodes of season two were made available on iTunes on December 3, 2017.

== Overview ==
The series chronicles the inner workings of a Democratic Party candidate for a U.S. Senate seat in Wisconsin. Led by campaign manager Chris "Tak" Davis, the team battles against corrupt politicians and staff infighting while campaigning for a distant third-place candidate.

== Cast ==
=== Starring ===
- Jay Hayden as Chris "Tak" Davis, Campaign Manager
- Teri Reeves as Kara "KJ" Jamison, Head of Media Strategy
- Jack DeSena as Cole Graner, Speechwriter
- Ben Samuel as Ben Werner, volunteer
- Jordan T. Maxwell as Jordan T. Mosley, the candidate's step-son
- Lindsey Payne as Lindsey Cutter, volunteer
- Alison Haislip as Ali Laurents, Social Media Director
- Meighan Gerachis as Deirdre Samuels, the candidate
- Sam White as George Mosley, the candidate's husband

=== Guest starring ===
- John Kishline as Jack Makers, the incumbent
- Matt Corboy as Michael Corboy, Makers campaign manager
- Kelly O'Sullivan as Sarah, Tak's wife
- Ray Wise as Frank "D-Day" Davis, Tak's father

== Production ==
In October 2010, Fox gave a script commitment to the series, which was being written by J. D. Walsh and executive-produced by Walsh and Marc Webb, with 20th Century Fox Television as the attached studio at the time. Fox later passed on making the show. Walsh shot a 20-minute pilot funded by family members. He said no television network was willing to air the series due to its politics-related theme. Hulu later stepped in to produce the series.

Battleground is set in Wisconsin, the childhood home of long-time friends Walsh and Webb. Walsh has also worked for Massachusetts Senator John Kerry in a previous political campaign. In a press release, he said: "People hate politics but they love elections. Campaigns are about good versus evil, our team versus yours, relationships, temptations, power, unimaginable triumphs and heartbreaking defeats. I’m interested in the people behind the people."

The first season was filmed in Walsh's hometown of Madison, Wisconsin, with sets ranging from local homes to a local elementary school. Walsh said he chose to film in Madison instead of Los Angeles because he had a better feel for the people, places and politics and there was a "sense of excitement" among the locals to be a part of the project. As many as 90 local actors were cast. Local WKOW anchors Greg Jeschke and Sabrina Hall appeared in a fake broadcast. To stage large crowds, real-life scenes of fans heading to a University of Wisconsin–Madison football game were used. Walsh calls the show "a love letter to Madison".

== Episodes ==
Season	Episodes	Originally released		
Season	Episodes	First released	Last released	Network
1	13	February 14, 2012	May 8, 2012	Hulu
2	6	December 2, 2017	June 21, 2018	UK3

=== Television: Season 1 (2012) ===
The first season consists of 13 episodes. The series premiere was made available online on February 14, 2012. New episodes were made available each subsequent week on Hulu.

No. overall	No. in season	Title	Directed by	Written by	Original release date
1	1	"Pilot"	J. D. Walsh	J. D. Walsh	February 14, 2012
The episode introduces the race for a Senate seat in Wisconsin. The campaign team for State Senator Deirdre Samuels, who is trailing in the primary polls at third place, led by Tak Davis try to get her opponents to appear in a debate with her.
2	2	"Who Is Claire Villareal?"	J. D. Walsh	J. D. Walsh	February 21, 2012
Samuels moves up into second place in the polls but rumors of her being a lesbian are circulated by an anonymous attack ad and a planted question at a campaign event. The campaign team gears up for a straw poll event by stealing tickets from Senator Makers's campaign. Tak engineers a logistics change to ensure Samuels's speech at the straw poll event is well received.
3	3	"Hold The Whipped Cream"	J. D. Walsh	J. D. Walsh, Elizabeth Triplett	February 28, 2012
Samuels's husband George insists on holding a press conference to dispel rumors of her lesbian affair, but Tak maneuvers reporters to stay away. KJ receives an offer to become campaign manager in a race in Ohio but decides to stay on. The campaign holds a phone-bank fundraiser to raise enough money to buy ad spots on Leno. Jordan makes his stand-up comedy debut which exceeds expectations. Ben and Lindsey's budding relationship grows while Tak's marriage breaks down.
4	4	"The Comment"	J. D. Walsh	J. D. Walsh, Justin Abarca	March 6, 2012
Tak clashes with his team over a decision he makes when a surprising announcement from the Makers camp changes everything.
5	5	"They'll Burn Your Eyes"	J. D. Walsh	J. D. Walsh, Justin Abarca	March 13, 2012
When Tak gets a hold of damaging information about Assemblywoman Rudy's personal life, Samuels tells him not to release it to continue to run a clean campaign. Meanwhile, while chatting with the documentary crew, Cole stumbles onto a recording of Tak and KJ from the previous night.
6	6	"Polls Close At Six"	J. D. Walsh	J. D. Walsh, Scott Cushman	March 20, 2012
The campaign must come up with a plan to fight misinformation being circulated by their opponents. Cole confronts KJ about their relationship.
7	7	"Political Machine"	J. D. Walsh	J. D. Walsh	March 27, 2012
The Samuels campaign is told about an endorsement from Sen. Makers. Cole quits as speechwriter, and Jordan must give a speech to local elementary school students. The team discovers that facing Governor Creighton won't be easy, as the lines between allies and enemies begins to blur.
8	8	"Nothing to Hide"	J. D. Walsh	J. D. Walsh, Justin Abarca	April 3, 2012
Tak confronts George about financial misdealings, while KJ feels Cole's absence as she struggles to write a speech for Samuels. Ali causes some friction in Ben and Lindsey's relationship.
9	9	"It's Getting Ugly, Tak"	J. D. Walsh	J. D. Walsh	April 10, 2012
A break-in at campaign headquarters rattles the Samuels team, especially George. Tak must juggle his relationships with his father, his wife, and Cole, all while trying to plan a rally on a college campus.
10	10	"Flashback"	J. D. Walsh	J. D. Walsh	April 17, 2012
A flashback to 2004 looks at the relationship between Tak and his father, as well as some other familiar faces, during the Makers re-election campaign. The episode's format is shot and edited as a spoof/homage to MTV's True Life, hosted by real-life former vee-jay Dave Holmes.
11	11	"Nothing About Chile"	J. D. Walsh	J. D. Walsh, Elizabeth Triplett	April 24, 2012
With the election a week away, the DNC sends in a representative to help the Samuels campaign, who clashes with Tak over its direction. The Creighton campaign announces a press conference that leaves Tak trying to figure out what it's about.
12	12	"He's Better Than Television"	J. D. Walsh	J. D. Walsh, Justin Abarca, Scott Cushman	May 1, 2012
On Halloween, with only two days until the election, Cole opens up about his past, while Samuels must deal with the consequences of hers.
13	13	"Did You Win?"	J. D. Walsh	J. D. Walsh, Justin Abarca, Scott Cushman	May 8, 2012
On Election Day the team hopes that a last-second endorsement from the President will be enough to bring them victory.

=== Podcast: Season 2 (2017-18) ===
No. overall	No. in season	Title	Directed by	Written by	Original release date
14	1	"Episode 1"	Unknown	Unknown	December 2, 2017
15	2	"Episode 2"	Unknown	Unknown	December 3, 2017
16	3	"Episode 3"	Unknown	Unknown	December 3, 2017
17	4	"Episode 4"	Unknown	Unknown	June 21, 2018
18	5	"Episode 5"	Unknown	Unknown	June 21, 2018
19	6	"Episode 6"	Unknown	Unknown	June 21, 2018

== Broadcast ==
In its first ever appearance at the Television Critics Association (TCA) press tour on January 15, 2012, Internet streaming site Hulu announced that it will be airing the series online. Hulu's senior vice president of content Andy Forssell said the site picked up the series because it "saw a spark" and "[w]e see what J.D. [Walsh] sees in it and we know the audience is there."

Battleground is Hulu's first original scripted series. The series, along with Hulu's other original documentary series, is available for free rather than on the subscription-based Hulu Plus to enable the site to build its user base and reputation for original programming. The show premiered on February 14, 2012, with a new episode made available online each subsequent week.

== Reception ==
Battleground's first episode received mixed to positive reviews, with critics noting its relatively low production value but strong writing. The Associated Press's Jake Coyle described the show as a "light, watered-down knockoff of The Office" that comes off like a "student fantasy of playful politics." David Hinckley of the Daily News said the show "parlays [a solid professional cast] into some good jokes, political and otherwise" but viewers "should not expect that ... the look of the show will match what they see on broadcast or cable." Dean Robbins of local newspaper Isthmus called the first episode worthy of comparison to sophisticated modern sitcoms, saying it "distinguishes itself with strong writing and acting, not to mention a distinctive setting."
