= Teri Reeves =

American theater and television actress

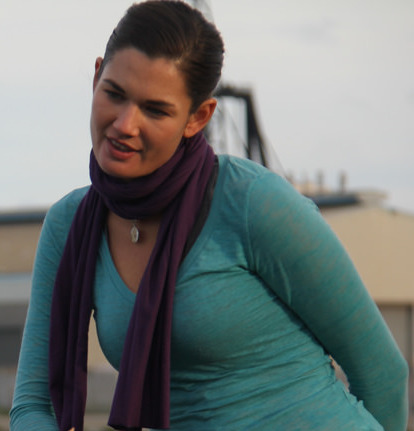
- Reeves in Leap Year, 2012
- Born: Bay Area, California, U.S.
- Occupation: Actress

Teri Reeves is an American theater and television actress. Her television credits include Chicago Fire, Battleground, and NCIS.

== Career ==
Reeves's most notable roles are KJ Jameson on Battleground, Hallie Thomas on Chicago Fire and Dorothy Gale on Once Upon a Time.

== Filmography ==
Films

Year	Title	
2011	Deadline	Linda
2014	Tentacle 8	Belle
2014	10 Year Plan	Diane
2017	Black Site Delta	Vázquez
2017	Furthest Witness	Helena
2018	Island Zero	

Television Shows

Year	Title	Role	Notes
2008	Numb3rs	Police Tech	Episode: "The Decoy Effect"
2008–2010	Days of Our Lives	Delilah/Babysitter/Kelsey	Episodes: #1.11341 #1.11316 #1.10915
2009	The Forgotten	Jane Doe/Ashley Kemp	Episode: "Prisoner Jane"
2009–2010	Three Rivers	Nurse Alicia/Alicia/Nurse/Alicia Wilson	4 episodes
2010	Undercovers	Fiona Cullen	Episode: "Jailbreak"
2010	Medium	Monica Janeway	Episode: "Talk to the Hand"
2010	Rules of Engagement	Janine	Episode: "Refusing to Budget"
2011	General Hospital	Megan McKenna	4 episodes
2011	Leap Year	Anne	Episode: "Corporate Cupid"
2012	Battleground	KJ Jameson	13 Episodes
2012–2013	Chicago Fire	Hallie Thomas	11 Episodes
2013	NCIS: Los Angeles	Antonia Prieto	Episode: "Paper Soldiers"
2013	NCIS	Navy Lt. J.G. Dana Robbins	Episode: "Under the Radar"
2013	Scandal	Kate	Episode: "Icarus"
2013	Castle	Miranda Vail	Episode: "The Good, the Bad, & the Baby"
2015	Grey's Anatomy	Rory	Episode: "Crazy Love"
2016	Once Upon a Time	Dorothy Gale	Season 5; recurring role
2019	Broken Sidewalk	Pepper	Season 1; recurring role
2019	The Punisher	Marlena Olin	Season 2; 3 Episodes
2021	Lucifer	Colonel O'Brien	Episode: "Resting Devil Face"
