= The Bannen Way =

2009 American web series

- Genre: Crime/Drama
- Created by: Jesse Warren; Mark Gantt
- Directed by: Jesse Warren
- Starring: Mark Gantt; Vanessa Marcil; Gabriel Tigerman; Michael Ironside; Robert Forster; Michael Lerner; Autumn Reeser; Brianne Davis; Brynn Thayer
- Composer: Joseph Trapanese
- Country of origin: United States
- Original language: English
- No. of seasons: 1
- No. of episodes: 16

Production
- Producer: Bailey Williams
- Running time: 5 to 8 minutes/ep.

Original release
- Network: Crackle
- Release: December 23, 2009 – January 22, 2010

The Bannen Way is an American crime drama web series starring Mark Gantt as Neal Bannen, a third generation criminal who wants to get out of the con man lifestyle he's been living. The show officially premiered on Crackle on January 6, 2010, but the first three episodes began streaming on December 23, 2009 to qualify for the Streamy Awards.

The fact that this series, along with several others, were regionally geoblocked led to a controversy over eligibility for the Streamys because it was not made fully available on the World Wide Web. The controversy led to a ruling by the Streamys that geoblocked web series are eligible.

The Bannen Way is a production of Sony Pictures Television. The executive producers are Mark Gantt and Jesse Warren. Gantt's co-stars are Vanessa Marcil, Gabriel Tigerman, Michael Ironside, and Robert Forster. Episodes were streamed weekdays through January 22, 2010. It was not renewed for a second season. The entire series was released onto DVD as a movie on July 20, 2010.

== Plot ==
Neal Bannen is a charming con-man with a police chief for a father (Michael Ironside), a mob boss for an uncle (Robert Forster), and a weakness for fine women. He wants to turn his life around and leave the criminal lifestyle for the straight and narrow, but after gambling away the funds he had earmarked to pay off his final debts, Bannen must accept one more job working for his uncle, Mr. B, to retrieve a mysterious box. To complete the job, Bannen solicits the help of his college-aged, techy sidekick Zeke (Gabriel Tigerman), and Madison (Vanessa Marcil), a beautiful and street savvy thief.

== Cast ==
- Mark Gantt as Neal Bannen
- Vanessa Marcil as Madison
- Gabriel Tigerman as Zeke
- Robert Forster as Mr. B
- Michael Ironside as Chief Bannen
- Michael Lerner as The Mensch
- Ski Carr as Sonny Carr

== Episodes ==
No.	Title	Original release date
1	"The Criminal Lifestyle"	December 23, 2009
After failing to triple his money and losing it all in a poker game, Bannen (Mark Gantt) is forced to do one more job to pay off his debt to the gangster Sonny Carr (Ski Carr).
2	"The Offer"	December 23, 2009
Bannen successfully pulls off the “Loft Job” with a $100,000 payday, only to be tracked down by his former employer, the mobster Mr. B (Robert Forster). Mr. B sucks Bannen back in with a million dollar job.
3	"The Third Strike"	December 23, 2009
While breaking the law to show off for his new acquaintance Madison (Vanessa Marcil), Bannen walks right into the hands of the Chief of Police (Michael Ironside).
4	"The Proposition"	January 6, 2010
Bannen is visited first by Madison and then Sonny's goons. He makes a deal with both.
5	"The Assassin Trio"	January 7, 2010
As Bannen and Madison begin to prep for the “Box Job,” Zeke (Gabriel Tigerman) informs them that The Mensch (Michael Lerner) has hired a trio of hot assassins to stop Bannen.
6	"The Unpaid Debt"	January 8, 2010
An unexpected visit with Sonny complicates the "Box Job".
7	"The Prep Day"	January 11, 2010
Successfully escaping the clutches of Sonny, Bannen and Madison put the final touches on their plan.
8	"The Sex Party"	January 12, 2010
It's go time for the "Box Job" at a party thrown by The Mensch. One of the Assassin Trio is in attendance.
9	"The Bait"	January 13, 2010
After the plan goes awry, Bannen tries to drown his sorrows at a strip club, where he meets the second of the Assassin Trio (Autumn Reeser).
10	"The Chase"	January 14, 2010
After Bannen escapes assassin number two and finds Madison (with The Box), it's Madison's turn to meet assassin number three (Brianne Davis).
11	"The Drop"	January 15, 2010
Bannen decides to play on the law's side for the day, but discovers that may not have been the best decision.
12	"The Rivalry"	January 18, 2010
The police chief and Mr. B have it out, bringing up old family scars.
13	"The Grudge"	January 19, 2010
It's back to Sonny's and a surprising twist of events returns The Box to Bannen.
14	"The Family Secret"	January 20, 2010
With Bannen's father in the hospital, some previously undisclosed information comes Bannen's way.
15	"The Truth"	January 21, 2010
Bannen is summoned by his uncle Mr. B to Inspiration Point where the truth is fleshed out.
16	"The New Bannen"	January 22, 2010
After unknowingly skirting the outcome of Mr. B's plans, Bannen begins anew.
