= Wedding Bell Blues (film) =

- Directed by: Dana Lustig
- Written by: Dana Lustig; Annette Goliti Gutierrez
- Story by: Annette Goliti Gutierrez
- Produced by: Ram Bergman; Mike Curb; Dana Lustig; Carole Curb Nemoy
- Starring: Illeana Douglas; Paulina Porizkova; Julie Warner; John Corbett; Jonathan Penner; Charles Martin Smith; Stephanie Beacham
- Cinematography: Kent L. Wakeford
- Edited by: Caroline Ross
- Music by: Tal Bergman; Paul Christian Gordon
- Production companies: Legacy Releasing; Curb Entertainment
- Distributed by: BMG Independents
- Release date: October 18, 1996
- Running time: 102 minutes
- Country: United States
- Language: English
- Box office: $44,052

Wedding Bell Blues is a 1996 romantic comedy film directed by Dana Lustig and starring Illeana Douglas, supermodel Paulina Porizkova, and Julie Warner. The film was named after the classic 1960s Laura Nyro/5th Dimension song "Wedding Bell Blues".

== Plot ==
Three women are apartment mates: one is about to be married, another discovers she is pregnant by her longtime boyfriend, and the third has an endless queue of men in and out of her bedroom. Sudden jiltings lead them to Vegas.

== Cast ==
- Illeana Douglas as Jasmine
- Paulina Porizkova as Tanya Touchev
- Julie Warner as Micki Rachel Levine
- John Corbett as Cary Maynard Philco
- Jonathan Penner as Matt Smith
- Charles Martin Smith as Oliver Napier
- Richard Edson as Tom
- Joseph Urla as Jeff Freeman
- Carla Gugino as Violet
- Stephanie Beacham as Mrs. Touchev, Tanya's mother
- Liz Sheridan as Mrs. Levine, Micki's mother
- Steven Gilborn as Samuel Levine, Micki's father
- John Capodice as Jasmine's father
- Jane Seymour as Jan
- Kamala Dawson as Pregnant Woman
- Leo Rossi as Robert
- Victoria Jackson as Mrs. Spell (Botique Customer)
- Carol Ann Susi as Aunt Anash
- Debbie Reynolds as herself

== Release ==
The film, with an R Rating, grossed only $44,052 in the domestic box office, on a maximum/initial release of 11 theaters.

== Reception ==
On the review aggregator website Rotten Tomatoes, 40% of 5 critics' reviews are positive.
