= Julie Warner =

American actress (born 1964 or 1965)

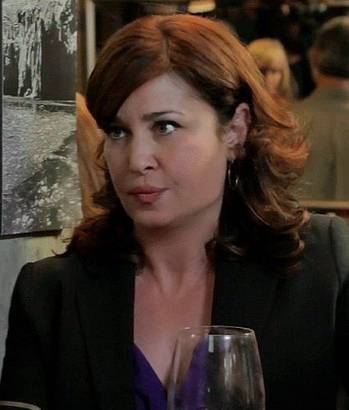
- Warner in Leap Year, 2012
- Born: Juliet Mia Warner; 1964 or 1965 (age 61–62); Manhattan, New York, United States
- Occupation: Actress
- Years active: 1981–present
- Spouse: Jonathan Prince (m. 1995; div. 2010)

Juliet Mia Warner (born 1964 or 1965) is an American actress. She is known for playing Danni Lipton on Family Law (1999–2001), Megan O'Hara on Nip/Tuck (2003–2006), Lou in Doc Hollywood (1991), Elaine in Mr. Saturday Night (1992), Michelle in Tommy Boy (1995), Micki in Wedding Bell Blues (1996), and Dean York in Chalk It Up (2016). She also appeared in the 1989 HBO special The Diceman Cometh with comedian Andrew Dice Clay.

== Early life ==
Warner was born to Naomi, an independent marketing consultant, and Neil Warner, a composer and pianist. Her paternal grandfather, Jack Shilkret, and paternal great uncle, Nathaniel Shilkret, were composers. She attended the Dalton School at age twelve. There she met an agent who advised her to consider acting. Shortly thereafter, she landed a role on the soap opera Guiding Light. Warner studied theater arts at Brown University. After her graduation, she moved to Los Angeles, where she worked as a waitress while auditioning for acting roles. She is Jewish.

== Career ==
Warner performed in conservatory theater and summer stock theater and appeared in two episodes of Star Trek: The Next Generation: “Booby Trap" in 1989 and "Transfigurations" in 1990. She also appeared in commercials for products, including Pert Plus.

Warner's breakout role was in the film Doc Hollywood (1991), co-starring with Michael J. Fox. Next came her co-starring role with Billy Crystal in Mr. Saturday Night (1992). She was in Indian Summer (1993), The Puppet Masters (1994), based on Robert A Heinlein's novel of the same name, and in Tommy Boy (1995). She portrayed Amy Sherman in Pride and Joy (1995). She played the role of Danni Lipton in the TV series Family Law, and the recurring character Megan O'Hara in Nip/Tuck. In 2005, Warner began starring as the wife to Howie Mandel in his short-lived hidden camera/situation comedy Hidden Howie: The Private Life of a Public Nuisance and appeared in the film Stick It (2006). Other credits include a guest appearance on an episode of House. She starred in the 2008 Hallmark Channel movie Our First Christmas where she plays a mother trying to navigate the difficult waters of combining two families after the deaths of her own and her new husband's spouses. In 2009, she played Rose Pinchbinder in the children's TV show True Jackson, VP in the episode "Keeping Tabs". In 2012, she guest starred in a season seven episode of Dexter, "Chemistry", as the sister of Hannah McKay's dead husband.

== Personal life ==
Warner was married to writer-director Jonathan Prince from 1995 until 2010.

== Filmography ==
=== Film ===
Year	Title	Role	Notes
1990	Flatliners	Joe's Woman	
1991	Doc Hollywood	Vialula / Lou	
1992	Mr. Saturday Night	Elaine Young	
1993	Indian Summer	Kelly Berman	
1994	The Puppet Masters	Mary Sefton	
1995	Tommy Boy	Michelle Brock	
1996	Wedding Bell Blues	Micki Rachel Levine	
1997	White Lies	Mimi Furst	
1999	Pros & Cons	Eileen	
2006	Stick It	Phyllis Charis	
2008	Forever Strong	Natalie Penning	
2010	Radio Free Albemuth	Newscaster #1	
2012	Little Women, Big Cars	Barbara	
2014	Telling of the Shoes	Ellie	
2015	Breaking Through	Mom / Anna	
2016	The Beautiful Ones	Caterina Tancredi	
2016	Chalk It Up	Dean York	
2020	Unbelievable!!!!!	Female Curlisha	

=== Television ===
Year	Title	Role	Notes
1981	Guiding Light	Cynthia	Episode: "Tainted Evidence"
1988	The Diceman Cometh	Girlfriend	Opening Vignette
1988	21 Jump Street	Alice Greenwood	Episode: "Come from the Shadows"
1989–90	Star Trek: The Next Generation	Christy Henshaw	Episodes: "Booby Trap"; "Transfigurations"
1990	Stolen: One Husband	Jennie	TV film
1990	The Outsiders	Charlene Walker	Episode: "Breaking the Maiden"
1993	Herman's Head	Layla	Episode: "Layla – The Unplugged Version"
1995	Pride & Joy	Amy Sherman	Main role
1998	Grown-Ups	Rena	TV film
1998	Mr. Murder	Paige Stillwater	TV film
1999	Party of Five	Lauren	"The Wish", "Get Back", "Fragile"
1999–2001	Family Law	Danni Lipton	Main role
2002	Baseball Wives	Lorraine Bradley	TV film
2003	A Screwball Homicide	Shelly	TV film
2003	Threat Matrix	Carrie Richmond	Episode: "Alpha-126"
2003–06	Nip/Tuck	Megan O'Hara	Recurring role
2004	Scrubs	Allison	Episode: "My Tormented Mentor"
2005	Hidden Howie: The Private Life of a Public Nuisance	Howie's Wife	TV film
2005	Just Legal	Mrs. Ross	Episodes: "Pilot", "The Runner"
2006	House	Margo Dalton	Episode: "Need to Know"
2007	Uncaged Heart	Janet Tarr	TV film (Also known as Passion's Web)
2007	Crossroads: A Story of Forgiveness	Melissa	TV film
2008	Our First Christmas	Cindy Baer-Noll	TV film
2009	True Jackson, VP	Rose Pinchbinder	Episode: "Keeping Tabs"
2009	Crash	Andrea Schillo	Recurring role
2011–12	Leap Year	Josie Hersh	3 episodes
2012	Supermoms	Maggie	TV series
2012	Little Women, Big Cars 2	Barbara	TV series
2012	Dexter	Lori Randall	Episode: "Chemistry"
2013	Grey's Anatomy	Mrs. Lanz	Episode: "The End Is the Beginning of the End"
2013	Maron	Diane	Episode: "Projections"
2014	Taken Away	Barbara	TV film
2016	Code Black	Renee	Episode: "Exodus"
2021	The Good Doctor	Pam Dilallo	2 episodes
