= Emma Caulfield =

American actress (born 1973)

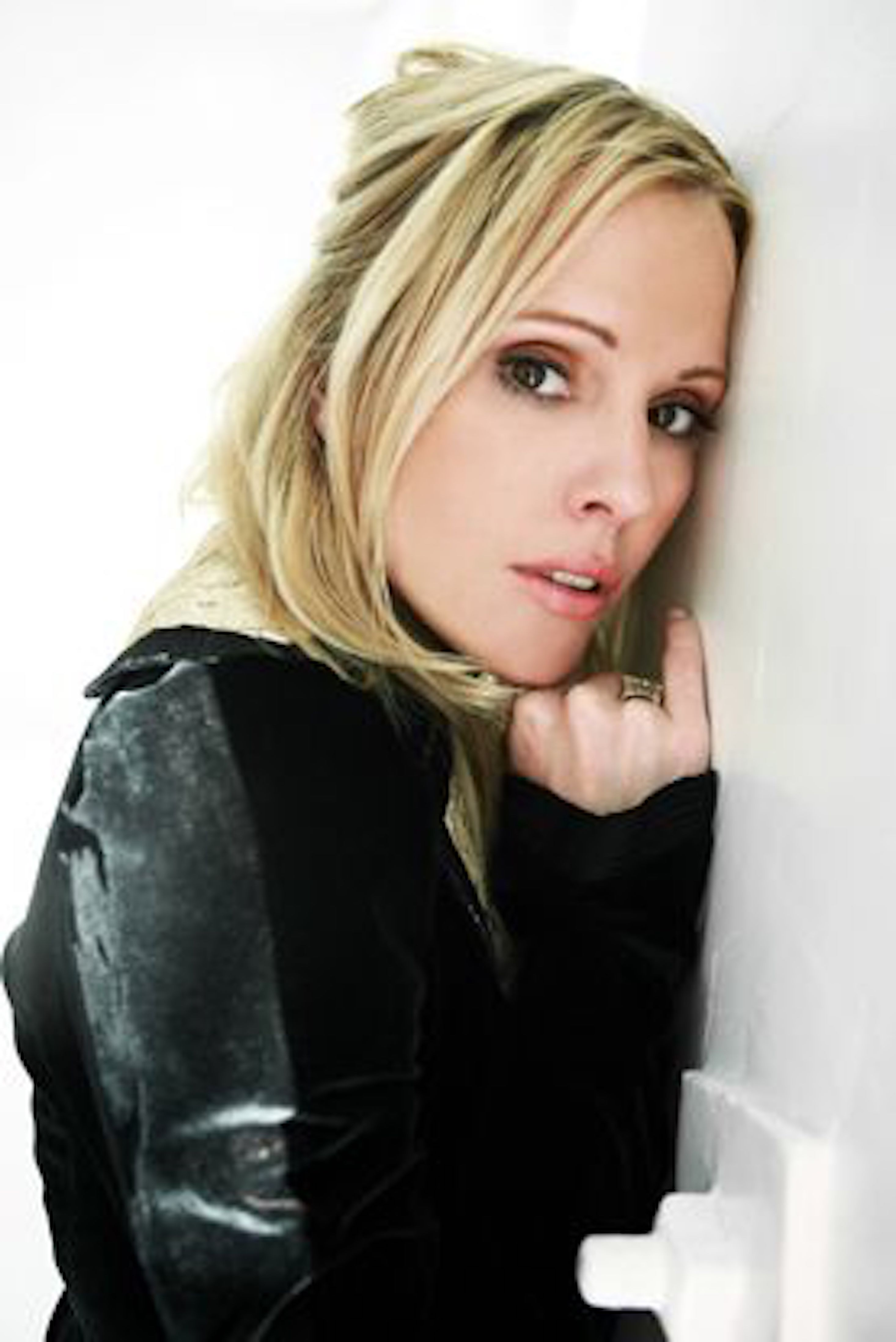
- Caulfield in 2021
- Born: Emma Chukker; April 8, 1973 (age 53); San Diego, California, U.S.
- Occupation: Actress
- Years active: 1994–present
- Known for: Buffy the Vampire Slayer; Beverly Hills, 90210
- Spouses: Cornelius Grobbelaar (m. 2006; div. 2010) Mark Leslie Ford (m. 2017)
- Children: 1

Signature
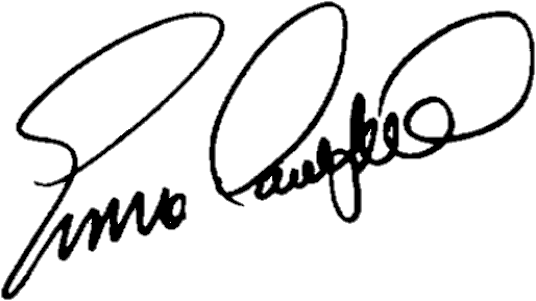

Emma Caulfield Ford (born April 8, 1973) is an American actress. She is best known for her starring role as former demon Anya Jenkins on the supernatural drama television series Buffy the Vampire Slayer (1998–2003), which earned her a nomination for the Satellite Award for Best Cast. She had recurring roles as Susan Keats on the Fox teen drama series Beverly Hills, 90210 (1995–1996), as Nurse Lorraine Miller on General Hospital (1997–1998), as Emma Bradshaw on the CW teen drama series Life Unexpected (2010–2011), and as Sarah Proctor on the Disney+ miniseries WandaVision (2021), a role she reprised in its spin-off Agatha All Along (2024). She starred in the supernatural horror film Darkness Falls (2003) and in the romantic comedy film Timer (2009) and had a supporting role in the comedy film Back in the Day (2014).

== Life and career ==
Caulfield was born on April 8, 1973, in San Diego, California, to Denise and Rodney Chukker.

Her first notable role was as Brandon Walsh's girlfriend, Susan Keats, on Beverly Hills, 90210 in 1995. She appeared for thirty episodes in the series before departing in 1996. In 1998, Caulfield starred in her most famous role to date, as Anya Jenkins on the WB's hit show Buffy the Vampire Slayer. Originally, her character was only to appear for two episodes. However, audiences responded well to Anya, resulting in Buffy the Vampire Slayer creator Joss Whedon's decision to add her to the main cast. In 2003, Caulfield landed her first lead role in the horror movie Darkness Falls, which debuted at number one in the U.S. box office. In 2004, she appeared on Monk as Meredith Preminger in the episode "Mr. Monk and the Girl Who Cried Wolf".

Caulfield also produced and starred in the satire Bandwagon, playing a fictionalized version of herself. The movie was written and directed by close friend and fellow actress Karri Bowman. It screened at various festivals, although it has not been picked up for distribution. Several members of Buffy the Vampire Slayer cast and crew have cameos in the film. In 2010, Caulfield posted the original Bandwagon to YouTube along with a 12-part webseries sequel set several years later.

Caulfield is also the co-author of the webcomic Contropussy, which has been published by IDW Publishing.

Caulfield starred in the independent feature film TiMER, released May 2009. She starred as the lead role in the Funny or Die short film, Don't Panic, It's Organic. In 2012, she received critical acclaim for her guest appearance on the ABC fantasy series Once Upon a Time, as the Blind Witch from the fairytale Hansel and Gretel. She guest starred in the second season of the Jane Espenson scripted romantic comedy web series, Husbands.

== Personal life ==
Caulfield was married to Cornelius Grobbelaar from 2006 to 2010.

In 2016, Caulfield confirmed that she was expecting a child with Mark Leslie Ford. She gave birth to a daughter later that year. She and Ford married in November 2017.

Caulfield was diagnosed with multiple sclerosis in 2010. She did not reveal her diagnosis to the public until 2022.

== Filmography ==
=== Film ===
Year	Film	Role	Notes
2003	Darkness Falls	Caitlin Greene	
2004	Bandwagon	Emma Caulfield	
2009	Timer	Oona O'Leary	
2009	Why Am I Doing This?	Amber	
2010	Confined	Victoria Peyton	
2010	Removal	Jennifer	Alternative title: Shadow Play
2014	Back in the Day	Molly	
2014	Telling of the Shoes	Alexandra	
2022	I'm Charlie Walker	Fran	

=== Television ===
Year	Film	Role	Notes
1994	Burke's Law	Beth	Episode: "Who Killed the Beauty Queen?"
1994	Renegade	Cindy Moran	Episode: "Teen Angel"
1994	Saved by the Bell: The New Class	Nurse Brady	Episode: "Bloody Money"
1995	Weird Science	Phoebe Hale	Episode: "What Genie?"
1995, 1997	Silk Stalkings	Ray Washburn / Kate Donner	Episodes: "Champagne on Ice", "Guilt by Association"
1995–1996	Beverly Hills, 90210	Susan Keats	Recurring role (season 6)
1997–1998	General Hospital	Lorraine Miller	Recurring role
1998	Nash Bridges	Reporter	Episode: "Live Shot"
1998–2003	Buffy the Vampire Slayer	Anyanka "Anya" Jenkins	Recurring role (seasons 3–4); main role (seasons 5–7); 81 episodes Golden Satellite Award (nominated); Cinescape Genre Face of the Future Award (won)
2004	I Want to Marry Ryan Banks	Charlie Norton	Television film; also known as The Reality of Love
2004	Monk	Meredith Preminger	Episode: "Mr. Monk and the Girl Who Cried Wolf"
2006	In Her Mother's Footsteps	Kate Nolan	Television film
2006, 2007	Robot Chicken	Nancy / Timmy's mom Minerva McGonagall / Mother; White Witch / Wife	Voice roles; episodes: "Massage Chair", "Password: Swordfish", "Robot Chicken's Half-Assed Christmas Special"
2007	A Valentine Carol	Ally Simms	Television film
2009	Private Practice	Leanne	Episode: "Wait and See"
2010–2011	Gigantic	Sasha	Recurring role
2010–2011	Life Unexpected	Emma Bradshaw	Recurring role (season 2)
2011	Leverage	Meredith	Episode: "The Lonely Hearts Job"
2011	Prime Suspect	Montana	Episode: "Gone to Pieces"
2012	Husbands	Stadium interviewer	2 episodes
2012	Leap Year	Smiley	Episode: "One of Those Nights"
2012	Royal Pains	Winnie	Episode: "Off Season Greetings"
2012; 2016	Once Upon a Time	Blind Witch	Recurring role (seasons 1 & 5)
2016	Supergirl	Cameron Chase	Episode: "Childish Things"
2017	Fear the Walking Dead	Tracy Otto	Episode: "TEOTWAWKI"
2017	Training Day	Lauren	Episode: "Wages of Sin"
2020	Interrogation	Amy Harlow	Episode: "P.I. Charlie Shannon vs Amy Harlow 2003"
2021	WandaVision	Sarah Proctor / "Dottie Jones"	Recurring role; 4 episodes
2021	Good Girls	Real Estate Agent	Episode: "Family First"
2024	Agatha All Along	Sarah Proctor	Episode: "Seekest Thou the Road"

== Awards and nominations ==
Year	Award	Category	Production	Result
2003	Satellite Awards	Best Performance by an Actress in a Supporting Role in a Drama Series	Buffy the Vampire Slayer	Nominated
2003	Saturn Awards	Cinescape Genre Face of the Future Award (Female)	Darkness Falls and Buffy the Vampire Slayer	Won
2007	Beverly Hills Film Festival	Best Actress in a Short Film	Hollow	Won
2007	Sydney Film Festival	Best Performance by an Actress in a Leading Role	Hollow	Won
