= Ricky Russert =

American actor and producer (born 1983)

- Born: July 22, 1983 (age 43); Kennewick, Washington
- Education: Washington State University
- Occupations: Actor, producer
- Years active: 2006–present

Ricky Russert (born July 22, 1983) is an American actor and producer known for his roles as Tommy Littlestone on the Cinemax original series Banshee and Shane Stant in the 2017 biopic I, Tonya.

== Career ==
On television, Russert has played Chris in The Walking Dead, Frank in Mr. Mercedes and Lt. Samuel Diaz in the CBS reboot of MacGyver. In 2016, Russert wrote, produced and starred in the short film, Sllip.

=== Film ===
Year	Title	Role	Notes
2006	Walkout	Jack	
2006	All's Fair	PFC Fitzgerald	
2014	The Fright Night Files	Emilio	
2016	Ride Along 2	Troy's #2	
2016	Sllip	Cam	
2017	I, Tonya	Shane Stant	Hollywood Film Award for Ensemble of the Year; Nominated – Florida Film Critics Circle Award for Best Ensemble
2021	R and J	Gregory	
2021	The Ravine	Bags	
2021	Queen Bees	Pablo Leon	

=== Television ===
Year	Title	Role	Notes
2013	Touch	The Burly Man	Episode: "The Burly Man"
2014-2015	Banshee	Tommy Littlestone	
2016	Intricate Vengeance	Derek Winter	Episode: "Pilot"
2016-2017	The Walking Dead	Chris	
2017-2018	Mr. Mercedes	Frank	
2017	MacGyver	Will Franklyn	Episode: "DIY or DIE"
