= The Temp Life =

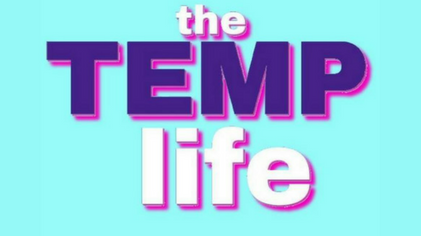
- Title card
- Genre: Comedy
- Created by: Wilson Cleveland
- Written by: Wilson Cleveland; Yuri Baranovsky; Tony Janning; Gabe Uhr
- Directed by: Evan Ferrante; Jato Smith; Andrew Y. Park
- Starring: Wilson Cleveland; Mark Rywelski; Rachel Risen; Thom Woodley; Milo Ventimiglia; Illeana Douglas; Craig Bierko; Taryn Southern; Sandeep Parikh
- Country of origin: United States
- Original language: English
- No. of seasons: 5
- No. of episodes: 43 (list of episodes)

Production
- Producer: Wilson Cleveland
- Production location: New York City
- Cinematography: Jato Smith
- Camera setup: Single-camera
- Running time: 5–10 minutes
- Production companies: CJP Digital; Tailslating Productions

Original release
- Network: YouTube; My Damn Channel (2010-2011)
- Release: November 29, 2006 – January 23, 2011

The Temp Life is an American comedy web series created and produced by Wilson Cleveland, who also stars as Nick Chiapetta (AKA "Trouble"). The series, sponsored by Spherion debuted on YouTube on November 29, 2006, ran for five seasons and is considered to be the first and longest-running online branded entertainment series.

== Premise ==
The series revolves around Nick “Trouble” Chiapetta (Cleveland), an incompetent temp agency boss and the temps he works with.

== History ==
In 2006 while working at a public relations firm in New York City, Wilson Cleveland was inspired by then one year-old YouTube and the potential of online video to "make little TV shows on the Internet for clients to tell their stories." Cleveland created The Temp Life, in 2006 for Spherion Staffing to raise brand awareness among 18-25 year-olds.

The Temp Life was among the first web series to become a new media signatory with the Screen Actors Guild and Writers Guild in 2009. and featured guest appearances by Milo Ventimiglia, Craig Bierko and Illeana Douglas

The first four seasons premiered on YouTube, Blip, MySpace, Daily Motion and Facebook. Episodes of the fifth and final season premiered first on My Damn Channel and YouTube before becoming available on iTunes, MSN Video, Blip, Daily Motion, Facebook and various video-on-demand platforms including Roku and Boxee set-top boxes and Verizon Fios. In January 2010, The Temp Life became available on-demand in nearly two million U.S. hotel rooms via LodgeNet’s DoNotDisturbTV hotel room network.

== Reception ==
The Temp Life added an average of 85% more viewers with each season and had reached over 18 million upload views when Fast Company called it “a bona fide phenomenon” in September 2010.

The series received generally favorable reviews with critics calling positive attention to the minimal Spherion branding contained in The Temp Life episodes. In her August 25, 2010 review, AdWeek's Rachel Kaufman wrote, "It doesn't hurt that there's almost no pitching, just a quick logo at the beginning, and that the series is genuinely humorous" and GigaOm's Liz Shannon Miller called The Temp Life "an on-the-nose sponsored series" that's "proven that you don't need to drop the sponsor into every scene in order to spread the message."

In a 2010 interview, SFN Group CEO, Roy Krause said that The Temp Life was the company's top marketing priority. Christian, Aymar (2014). Media Independence: Working with Freedom Or Working for Free?. Routledge. p. 174. ISBN 9781317690344.

In 2012 ‘’The Temp Life’’ won the Webby Award for Comedy: Longform or Series and received a Streamy Award nomination for Best Branded Entertainment Web Series in 2010.

== Plot ==
=== Season 1 (2006 - 2007) ===
The first season premiered on YouTube November 29, 2006. Mark (Mark Rywelski) comes to interview for a temp job at Pedtastic - a social network for shoe lace makers and meets Nick Chiapetta (Wilson Cleveland), the company's self-professed ‘’Deputy of Trouble.’’ New temp Laura (Laura Kowalcyk) is hired to manage Pedtastic's new office.

=== Season 2 (2008) ===
The second season premiered on September 13, 2008 with the episode titled, “Mergers and Acquisitions,” in which Nick gets conned into selling his Pedtastic social network startup for shoe lace professionals to Commodity Staffing in a “multi-hundred dollar transaction.” Nick unwittingly makes Pedtastic's only four employees - Mark, Laura, Paul and Caitlin part of the deal by contractually obligating them to become temps with Commodity Staffing for one year. In the season finale cliffhanger episode titled, “Where in the World?” Paul and Caitlin are accidentally outsourced to a call center in Thailand and Nick falls unconscious after drinking some bad coffee.

=== Season 3 (2009) ===
The third season premiered on February 19, 2009 with the episode titled, “Dream Big!” Nick's guardian angel Tom Cruise (played by Evan Ferrante) comes to him in a dream and convinces him to take a 33-week sabbatical and leave Mark and Laura in charge of Commodity Staffing.

=== Season 4 (2009–2010) ===
The fourth season was announced on September 10, 2009 and premiered on November 15, 2009. Nick returns from sabbatical to find he and Commodity Staffing have been sued out of business and pushed out of his office space by Celltons, a cell phone button-maker. Having lost everything in the lawsuit, Nick takes a temp job transcribing video resume submissions for Celltons' Head of Human Acquisitions, Alina Deloris (Rachel Risen). When Celltons CEO, Eve Randall (Illeana Douglas) threatens layoffs, Nick plots to get Alina fired by recruiting only the least-qualified temps who apply to work at Celltons including Nancy Roder (Taryn Southern) and Stevie P. (Sandeep Parikh). Nick succeeds in getting Alina fired and convinces Eve to hire him as Celltons’ new head of Human Acquisitions.

=== Season 5 (2010–2011) ===
The fifth and final season was announced on July 29, 2010 and premiered on the My Damn Channel YouTube channel on December 9, 2010 with the episode titled "We're Number Two!" which finds Nick (Wilson Cleveland) living his best life. Celltons has become the number-two cell phone button company ever since Eve Randall (Illeana Douglas) fired Alina and put him back in charge of hiring temps. Little does Nick know that Eve has hired his estranged half-brother Eddie (Craig Bierko) to keep an eye on him. But Eddie has his own score to settle and secretly teams up with Alina to humiliate Nick and push him out of the company. Nick teams up with Cook (Milo Ventimiglia), the office lunch cart guy to catch a pastrami sandwich thief. Nick gets conned into hiring Thomas Clancy (Mark Gantt), the worst corporate spy in the history of corporate spies. Stevie P. (Sandeep Parikh) gets into a love triangle with Nancy Roder (Taryn Southern) and her twin sister Tammy (Jessica Lee Rose). The temps undergo corporate sensitivity training led by Counselor Rick (Tony Janning), a de-motivational speaker on the verge of a nervous breakdown. In the series finale episode titled “Return of the Eddie” which aired on January 23, 2011, Nick and Eddie reconcile and quit Celltons to open a lemonade stand in Mexico. They take all of the temps with them, leaving Alina all alone.
