= Intricate Vengeance =

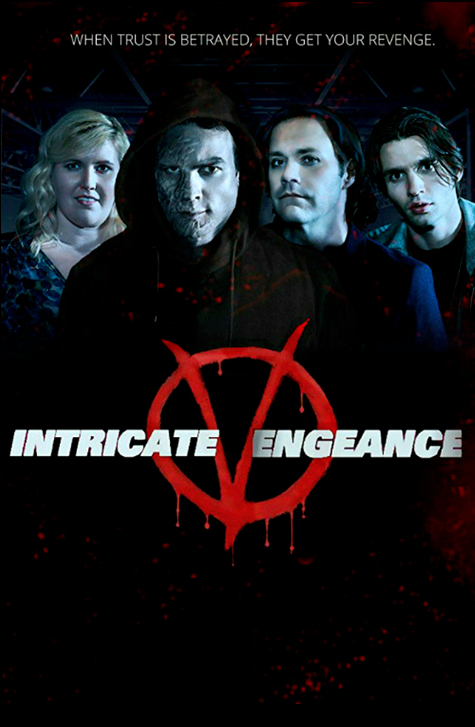
- Poster image
- Genre: Drama
- Created by: Wilson Cleveland
- Directed by: Mark Gantt
- Starring: Wilson Cleveland; Luke Cook; Meghan Tonjes; Vincent Cyr; Brianne Davis; Ricky Russert; Mitchell Davis
- Composer: Christian Davis
- Country of origin: United States
- Original language: English

Production
- Executive producers: Kathleen Grace; Melissa Schneider
- Producers: Adrienne Arno; Kal-El Bogdanove
- Production location: Los Angeles
- Cinematography: Justin Morrison
- Editor: Rowan Glenn
- Running time: 12 minutes
- Production company: New Form Digital

Original release
- Network: YouTube
- Release: April 5, 2016

Intricate Vengeance is a 2016 television drama pilot created by Wilson Cleveland and directed by Mark Gantt for New Form, the digital studio co-founded by Ron Howard, Brian Grazer and Discovery Communications. The project was announced on April 5, 2016 during New Form's presentation at the annual MIPTV Media Market and released on YouTube as part of New Form's Incubator Three Series of scripted pilots.

== Plot ==
Four survivors of violent crimes form a dark web market dedicated to producing real-life revenge fantasies for justice-starved clients. They follow a strict code of an eye for an eye, ignoring their own compulsions for revenge and revealing themselves to the public.

== Cast and characters ==
=== Main cast ===
- Wilson Cleveland as Dashiell Foley, Oliver's loyal protector, partner and confidant. Dashiell uses his training as a psychologist to craft the punishment Reagan Winter uses against her husband, Derek.
- Luke Cook as Oliver Sten, founder and financial backer of the organization who is disfigured with burns and consumed with guilt for causing the car accident that killed his wife Jill. Oliver sees a resemblance to Jill in his client Reagan Winter, leading Dashiell to intervene.
- Meghan Tonjes as Willa Finn, the organization's computer specialist and Oliver's hot-tempered, loyal bodyguard. She plans all of the technical logistics for Derek Winter's punishment and accuses Jared of sabotaging the plan when Derek ends up dead.
- Vincent Cyr as Jared Cross, the youngest member of the organization and responsible for driving blindfolded clients to and from various secret meeting locations.

=== Recurring ===
- Brianne Davis as Reagan Winter, horror movie actress and a client of the organization. She is seeking revenge against her husband, Derek for damaging her brand for cheating on her in public.
- Ricky Russert as Derek Winter, struggling actor and Reagan's husband. The group tricks him into stripping naked and staging a meltdown on live television, under the guise that he is auditioning for a film role.

== Reception ==
Intricate Vengeance received a 2016 Telly Award for Best Drama and generally favorable reviews from critics. In his April 9, 2016 Ain't It Cool News review, Muldoon wrote, "Wilson Cleveland's built an interesting first episode that's got me eager to see what's next for this bizarre group of individuals."
