= Wilson Cleveland =

American actor, producer and writer

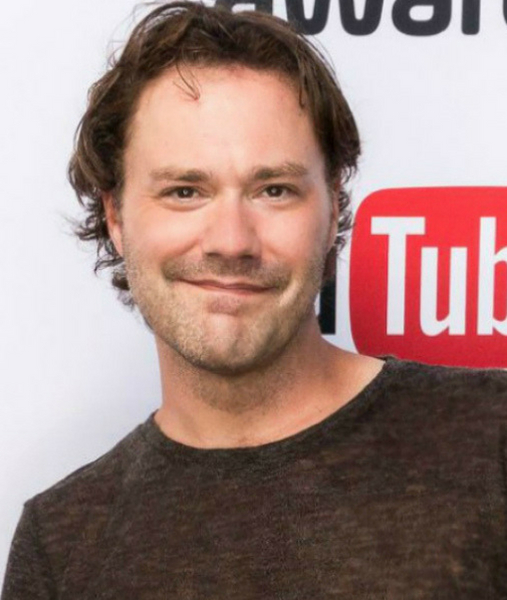
- Cleveland at the 2015 Streamy Awards
- Born: July 4, 1974 (age 52); Binghamton, New York, U.S.
- Education: Boston University
- Occupations: Actor; producer; writer
- Years active: 2006–present
- Website: wilsoncleveland.com

Wilson Cleveland (born July 4, 1974) is an American actor, producer and writer. He is known as the creator, producer and co-star of Leap Year and The Temp Life.

== Career ==
In 2006, Cleveland created and starred as the character Nick Chiapetta in The Temp Life, a comedy web series which debuted on YouTube on November 29, 2006 and ended January 24, 2011 after 5 seasons. In 2012, The Temp Life won the Webby Award for Best Comedy Series.

In 2011, Cleveland executive produced an 8 episode web series called Bestsellers. Cleveland created, executive produced and starred in Suite 7, a seven-episode branded web series sponsored by the Better Sleep Council and distributed by Lifetime.

Cleveland is the co-creator, executive producer and co-star of Leap Year, a comedy-drama series about five former co-workers starting a tech company in Silicon Valley, that aired for two seasons on Hulu from 2011 to 2012. It was revealed during the second season that Cleveland's character, Derek Morrison is gay. Cleveland, himself openly gay, explained in a June 28, 2013 NewMediaRockstars interview, "I wanted Derek’s sexuality to be a subtle layer to the character" and "not make it some big plot twist or its own storyline." In 2013, Leap Year won the Webby Award for Best Branded Entertainment (Scripted), the Streamy Award for Best Branded Series and the IAWTV Award for Best Dramatic Series.

== Other works ==
Cleveland produces content through Unboxd Media, which he founded. In 2010, Cleveland produced The Webventures of Justin and Alden, a five-episode comedy web series sponsored by Trident and produced in association with the 2010 Streamy Awards. In 2014, Cleveland starred in the season five premiere of BlackBoxTV. Also in 2014, Cleveland starred opposite Hartley Sawyer in the short films Kept Man and Spin. Cleveland and Sawyer shared a 2015 Webby Award for Best Drama for Kept Man while SPiN was named Best Drama by the Webbys in 2016. Also in 2016 Cleveland created and starred in Intricate Vengeance. Cleveland has also appeared in 3 episodes of Annoying Orange, has been a guest host for DNews, and is the creator and executive producer of Courageous Leaders.
