= Google Feud =

Website game

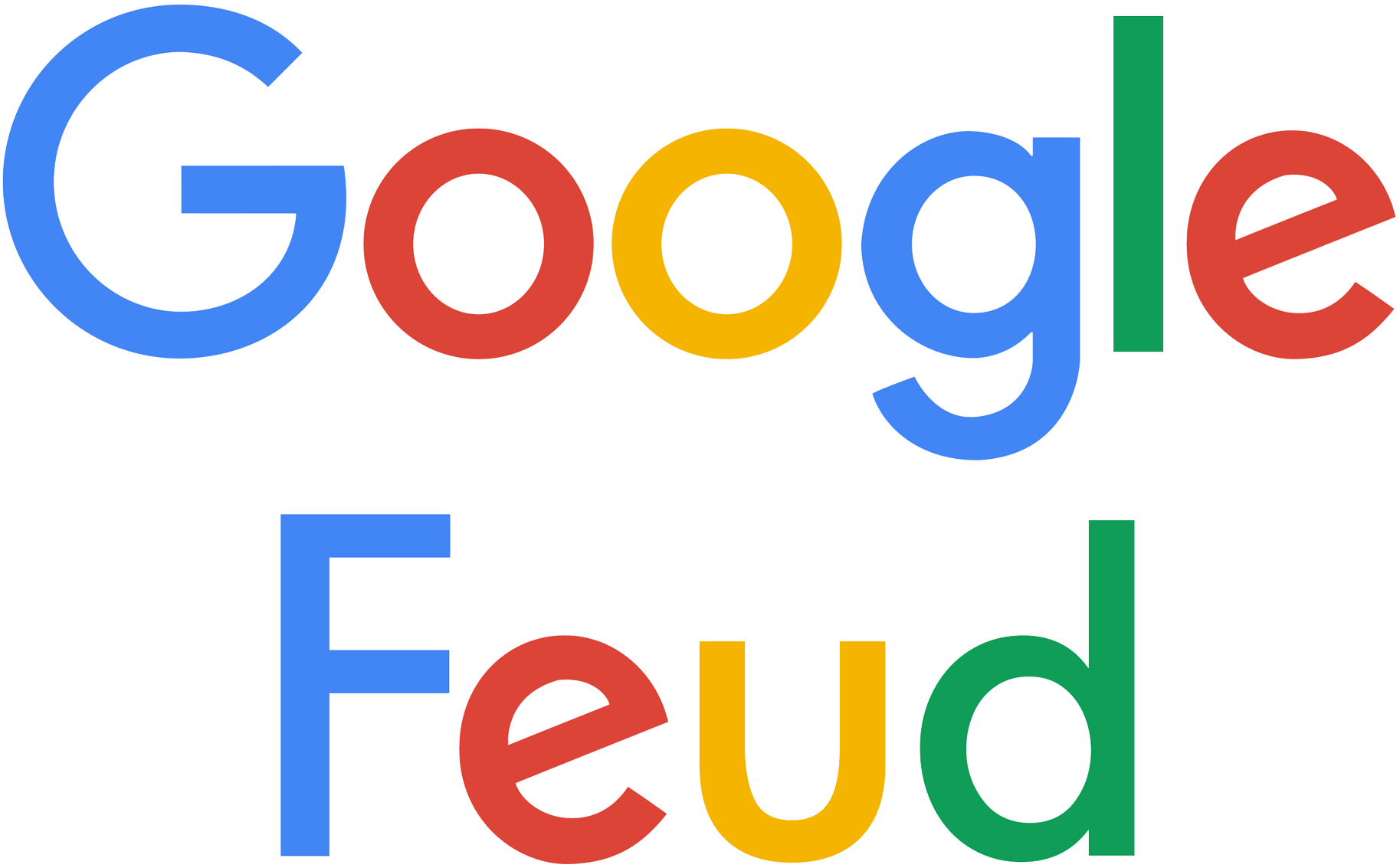
- Developer: Justin Hook
- Platforms: Browser, iOS, Android
- Release: April 23, 2013; 13 years ago
- Genre: Trivia
- Mode: Single player

Google Feud is a browser-based trivia game featuring answers pulled from Google. It is based on the American show Family Feud, and is unaffiliated with Google.

== History ==
The game was created in 2013 by American indie developer Justin Hook, a writer for Bob's Burgers on Fox.

Google Feud was demonstrated on @midnight with Chris Hardwick, referenced in the monologue of The Tonight Show Starring Jimmy Fallon.Time declared it "the online game we didn't know we were waiting for".

According to Colin McMillen, a staff software engineer at Google, a very similar game was played internally at Google.

== Controversy ==
Google Feud became the subject of some controversy for promoting the online game Push Trump Off A Cliff Again!, also created by Hook, after celebrities including John Leguizamo and Rosie O'Donnell promoted the game on their Twitter profiles.

== Awards ==
Google Feud won the "People's Voice" Webby Award for Games in 2016.
