= Mark Gantt =

American actor and director (born 1968)

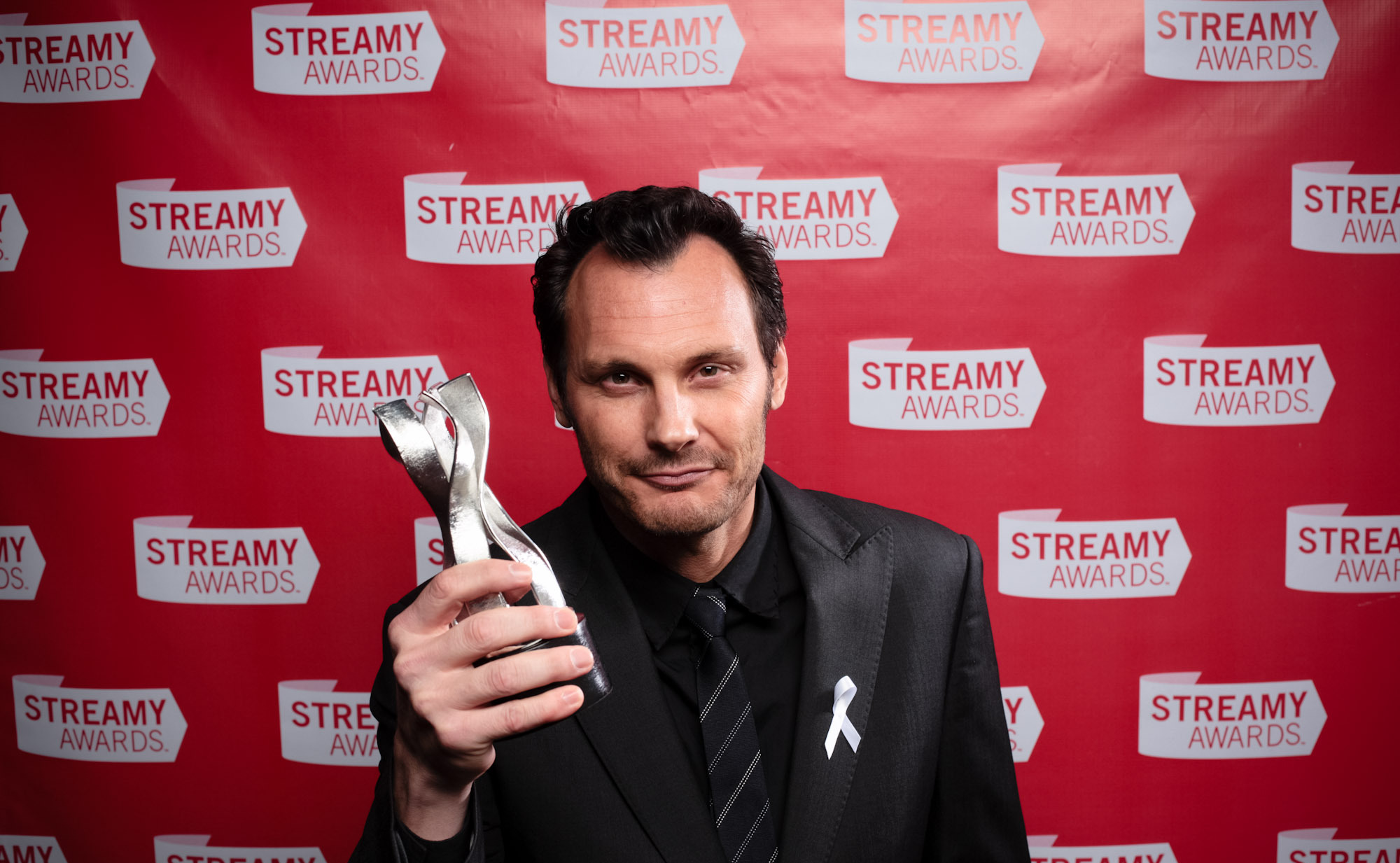
- Gantt at the 2nd Streamy Awards, 2010
- Born: Mark Willingham Gantt IV; December 10, 1968 (age 57); Stockton, California, U.S.
- Occupations: Actor, director, producer, writer
- Years active: 1997–present
- Website: http://www.markgantt.com/

Mark Willingham Gantt IV (born December 10, 1968) is an American actor, director, producer and writer. Gantt is best known for his role as Neal Bannen in the series The Bannen Way. Gantt grew up in Stockton, California, United States, and comes from a law enforcement family; he drew upon those family experiences as part of the backstory for the title character in The Bannen Way.

== Career ==
=== Early career ===
Gantt got his start in the entertainment business working in the art department and props while training as an actor and director at the Beverly Hills Playhouse under Milton Katselas. His credits on television shows and films include Criminal Minds, American Horror Story: Hotel, Ocean's Eleven, Charlie's Angels: Full Throttle, Buffy The Vampire Slayer, Dexter, Major Crimes, and a role in The Arrangement on E!.

=== The Bannen Way ===
Gantt plays the lead in The Bannen Way, which was designed as both a 16 episode web series and feature film. It has been streamed more than 13 million, and was designed "to reach a demographic of men 18-34 years old".

==== Directorial debut and collaborations ====
Gantt's feature directorial debut, Murder In Mexico: The Bruce Beresford Redman Story, was based on the real-life events involving CBS'sSurvivor producer, Bruce Beresford-Redman, who was convicted in Mexico of the murder of his wife, Mónica. The film premiered on Lifetime in September 2015.

==== Directorial work ====
In April 2016, Mark directed Intricate Vengeance for Ron Howard and Brian Grazer's New Form Digital studio. It was part of the 2016 Incubator program, a series to showcase and produce original scripted pilots. Mark directed branded series for platforms like AOL, Lifetime, and the Better Sleep Council.

In 2010 Gantt directed two episodes of the branded series Suite 7 with Shannen Doherty, Dexter's Jaime Murray, Warehou,se 13's Eddie McClintock and in 2011, the award-winning short film Donor starring Trevor Algatt and Alexis Boozer.

In 2020, Mark Gantt directed two feature films, both of which made their debut on Lifetime. The titles of these films were A Deadly Price For Her Pretty Face (also known internationally as Model Citizen).

On October 20, 2023, Mark's fourth feature, Soul Mates, was released in theaters. The film was written by Joseph S. Russo and Chris LaMont and stars Annie Ilonzeh, Charlie Weber, and Neal McDonough.

==== Writing Efforts ====
Gantt co-wrote Her Boyfriend's Deadly Secret with Evan Unruh which premiered on Lifetime and Deadly Infidelity, which premiered on Lifetime.

==== Podcasts and Audiobooks ====
In 2021, Gantt co-wrote the Audible series A Devil in the Valley, alongside Paul Holes, and retired FBI Special Agent Jim Clemente.

Mark Gantt and Brianne Davis launched Secret Life, a podcast that discusses love, sex, money, food, addiction, and hidden taboos.

==== Producer Credits ====
Mark Gantt worked as a producer on Psychophonia, a thriller directed by his wife, Brianne Davis. Mark and Brianne produced two horror/sci-fi films, The Night Visitor and The Night Visitor 2: Heather's Story.

==== Speaker ====
In 2011, Mark hosted the first annual NATPE Digital Luminary Awards in Miami, Florida.

== Personal life ==
Mark Gantt is married to Brianne Davis.

== Filmography ==
=== Film ===
Year	Title	Role
1997	Volcano	Rookie Cop
2001	Straight Right	Fila Man
2001	The Hollywood Sign	Party Boy
2001	Oceans Eleven	Bartender
2002	Good For Nothing	Christian Van Dien
2003	Charlie's Angels: Full Throttle	Longshorman
2004	29 and Holding	Claude
2005	Devil's Highway	Vanni
2005	Pura Lengua	Officer Jamison
2010	Taken By Force	Stark
2010	The Bannen Way	Neal Bannen
2012	Among Friends	Nick First AD
2012	Meridian	Blake Royce
2013	Hidden In The Woods	Costello's Accountant
2013	The Night Visitor	Randy
2014	Foe	Johan Meyer
2015	The Night Visitor 2: Heather's Story	Randy
2015	Psychophonia	Rudger
2020	A Deadly Price for Her Pretty Face	Director
2020	The Secret Life of a Celebrity Surrogate	Director
2021	Her Deadly Boyfriend	Writer
2022	Fatal Memory	Writer
2023	Soul Mates	Director
2026	F*ck Valentine's Day	Director

== TV Series/Internet Productions ==
Year	Title	Role
2000	Buffy The Vampire Slayer	Demon
2001	Arrest and Trial	Donald Newberry
2002	Days of Our Lives	Officer Mills
2003	Without A Trace	Bartender
2005	Unscripted	Actor
2005	Alias	Balfour
2006	The Shield	Bar Owner
2006	What About Brian	Bartender
2010	The Temp Life	Thomas Clancy
2011	Leap Year	Sergei
2011	Dexter	Mills
2011	Once Upon	Marcus
2011	The Guild	Chet Grunwald
2012	Oishi High School Battle	Principal Dave
2012	Sound Advice	Marco
2013	The Inn	Jeffrey
2013	D-Tec	Dobbs
2014	Bluff	Nick Westin
2014	Major Crimes	Ryan Brooks
2015	American Horror Story: Hotel	EMT Worker
2016	Barely Famous	Detective Davis
2016	The Arrangement	Adam Westfeldt (Recurring)
2017	Escaping Dad	Jason
2017	Criminal Minds	Det. Alex Russ

== Awards ==
Awards and nominations for Mark Gantt
Year	Award Show	Category	Work	Result
2010	2nd Streamy Awards	Best Male Actor in a Dramatic Web Series	The Bannen Way	Won
2010	2nd Streamy Awards	Best Dramatic Web Series	The Bannen Way	Won
2010	2nd Streamy Awards	Best Writing in a Dramatic Web Series shared with Jesse Warren	The Bannen Way	Nominated
2010	2nd Streamy Awards	Best Branded Web Series	The Bannen Way	Nominated
2010	2nd Streamy Awards	Best New Web Series	The Bannen Way	Nominated
2010	Webby Award	Best Drama Web Series	The Bannen Way	Nominated
2010	Webby Award	Best Editing	The Bannen Way	Nominated
2011	Banff World Media Festival	Best Drama Web Series	The Bannen Way	Nominated
2011	Banff World Media Festival	Best Drama Web Series	Suite 7	Nominated
2012	First Glance Film Festival Philadelphia	Best Director Short Film	Donor	Won
2012	Indie Cinema Series	Best of the Fest	Donor	Won
