= Spin (2015 film) =

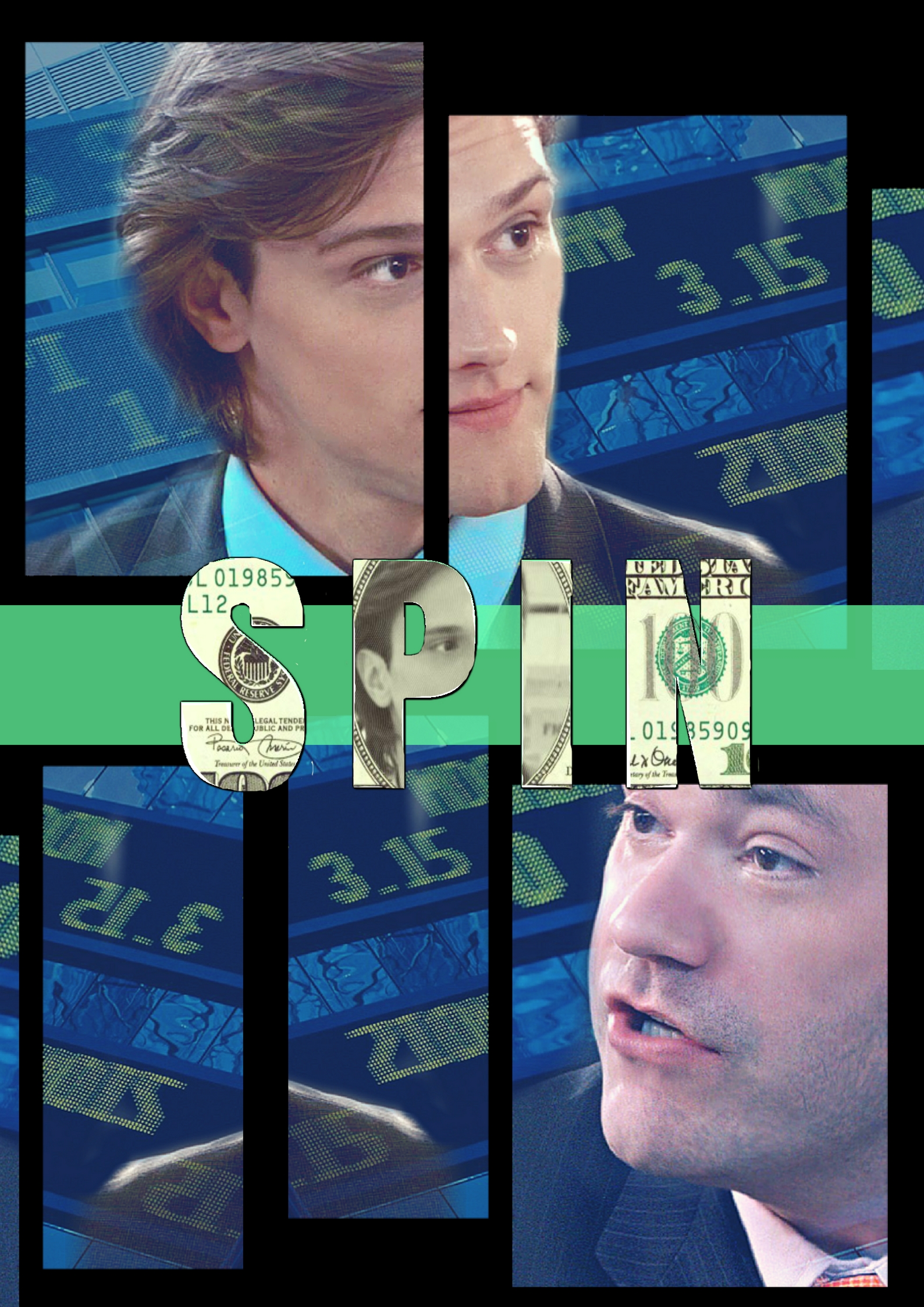
- Directed by: Noah Workman
- Screenplay by: Wilson Cleveland; Yuri Baranovsky
- Produced by: Patrick T. Rousseau; Wilson Cleveland
- Starring: Hartley Sawyer; Wilson Cleveland; Andrew Jernigan
- Production companies: Unboxd Media; Iris Mediaworks
- Distributed by: Amazon Prime; Vimeo on Demand
- Release date: February 6, 2015
- Running time: 14 minutes
- Country: United States
- Budget: $12,000

Spin, sometimes stylized as SPiN, is a 2015 short film drama directed by Noah Workman and written by Wilson Cleveland, who also stars. The film takes place over the course of a contentious live television interview between a Wall Street executive played by Hartley Sawyer and a financial journalist played by Cleveland.

== Reception ==
The film received a 2016 Webby Award honor for Individual Short (Drama) and generally favorable reviews from critics. In his March 6, 2015 IndieWire review, Joseph Ehrman-Dupre called SPiN a "sharp, smart satire" with writing "full of "spitfire one-liners" and NewMediaRockstars' Evan DeSimone credited the writing as being "Sorkin-esque in the best sense of the word." Tubefilter writer Sam Gutelle complained while "Wall Street corruption is a well-tread topic," SPiN is "A smart, twisty take on the world of high finance and media distortion."

== Cast ==
- Wilson Cleveland as James Locke
- Hartley Sawyer as Scott Angelus
- Andrew Jernigan as Entrepreneur
- Lewis Raymond Taylor as Lewis
- Ronnie Flynn as Entrepreneur
- Prophecy Onasis as Proph
- Bastiano Farran as Guest actor
- Jordan Alexander King as King Komm.
