= Craig Bierko =

American actor (born 1964)

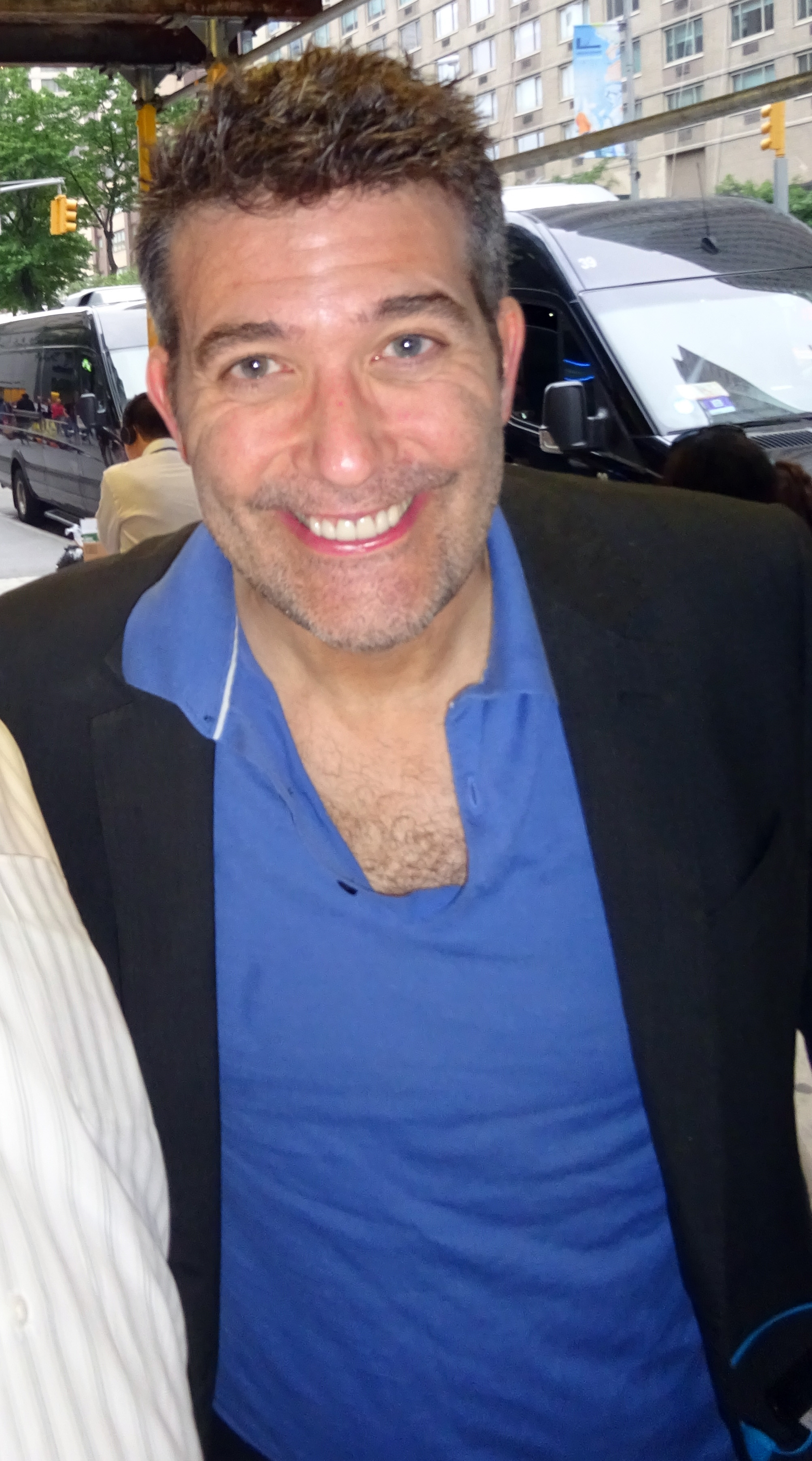
- Bierko in 2016
- Born: Craig Philip Bierko; August 18, 1964 (age 62); Rye Brook, New York, U.S.
- Occupations: Actor, singer
- Years active: 1987–present

Craig Philip Bierko (born August 18, 1964) is an American actor.

== Early life ==
Bierko was born in Rye Brook, New York, where, for a brief time, his mother Pat was president of The Harrison Players, a local community theatre.

After graduating Blind Brook High School, Bierko spent his freshman year studying journalism at Boston University’s School of Public Communications. But he spent most of his time across the Charles River doing plays at Harvard. The following year Bierko transferred to Northwestern University to study acting alongside David Schwimmer, Stephen Colbert, George Newbern and Harry Lennix. He graduated in 1986 with a BS in theater arts from the School of Speech.

== Career ==
=== Television and film ===
Bierko’s film roles include Timothy in the 1996 action film The Long Kiss Goodnight which he credits for being cast in far more interesting, darkly humorous roles such as Max Baer in Ron Howard’s Cinderella Man opposite Russell Crowe, Tom Ryan in Scary Movie 4 (spoofing Tom Cruise throughout the film), Fear and Loathing in Las Vegas, and The Thirteenth Floor. Bierko was the original choice for the character of Chandler Bing on the sitcom Friends but turned it down, contrary to the advice of his friends Matthew Perry and Hank Azaria. He played "the jazz guy" Ray King, a love interest for Carrie Bradshaw (Sarah Jessica Parker) in the fourth season of Sex and the City, attorney Jeffrey Coho on season three of the ABC television series Boston Legal, and one of four newly divorced friends on Fox’s short-lived Unhitched. Bierko was cast as Dave Lister in the pilot for the American TV version of the British show Red Dwarf. He has appeared twice on TV's Law & Order: Special Victims Unit – first as Andy Eckerson, a United States Deputy Marshal who is working with the SVU (and ex-flame Det. Olivia Benson) to recapture an escaped convict, and several years later, a serial rapist.

Bierko appeared for four seasons in the Peabody Award-winning series UnREAL as Chet Wilton, the eccentric, drug addicted, womanizing creator of a reality dating show. Recently, he appeared on The Blacklist as The Chairman, the coldly sociopathic head of an underground stock market for criminals, and was seen on season two of the hit Netflix show Sex/Life as a superstar literary agent.

=== Theater roles ===
In 2000, Bierko made his Broadway debut as Professor Harold Hill in Susan Stroman's critically acclaimed revival of Meredith Willson's The Music Man, for which he received a Tony Award nomination.

Bierko was slated to appear on Broadway in the Manhattan Theatre Club production of To Be or Not to Be but withdrew from the production August 29, 2008, for creative differences. He starred as Sky Masterson in the Broadway revival of Guys and Dolls which began performances at the Nederlander Theatre on February 5, 2009, and officially opened on March 1, 2009. It closed on June 14, 2009, after 113 performances. He performed the role of Peter in the acclaimed 2011 New York Philharmonic production of Stephen Sondheim's Company with Neil Patrick Harris, Patti Lupone and Stephen Colbert.

Bierko replaced Bertie Carvel as Miss Trunchbull in Matilda the Musical at the Shubert Theatre along with Jill Paice as Miss Honey on September 3, 2013, but could not start performances until September 17 following a neck and shoulder injury he suffered rehearsing a gymnastic flip. Despite the injury, Bierko continued rehearsing, eventually performing the role for about a month before the shoulder injury – along with a foot injury sustained during performance – made it impractical to continue.

In 2022, Conor McPherson cast Bierko as Mr. Burke in his Girl from the North Country (featuring music by Bob Dylan) opposite Luba Mason and Mare Winningham. The Tony Award-winning limited engagement played its final performance June 19, 2022.

== Personal life ==
Bierko was in a relationship with actress Charlize Theron from 1995 to 1997.

== Filmography and stage work ==
=== Film ===
Year	Title	Role	Notes
1987	Love Note	Craig Johnson	Video
1991	Victimless Crimes	Terry Sullivan	
1996	The Long Kiss Goodnight	Timothy	
1996	Johns	Christmas Radio Preacher	
1997	'Til There Was You	Jon Hass	
1998	Sour Grapes	Richie Maxwell	
1998	Fear and Loathing in Las Vegas	Lacerda	
1999	The Suburbans	Mitch	
1999	The Thirteenth Floor	Douglas Hall, John Ferguson, David	
2000	The Cherry Picker		Short film
2001	Kate & Leopold	Actor in Advertisement	Uncredited
2002	I'm with Lucy	Peter	
2003	Dickie Roberts: Former Child Star	George Finney	
2004	Hair High	Sarge (voice)	
2005	Cinderella Man	Max Baer	
2006	Scary Movie 4	Tom Ryan	
2006	Danika	Randy Merrick	
2006	For Your Consideration	Talk Show Host	
2007	Meet Bill	Sergeant	Uncredited
2008	Superhero Movie	Wolverine	Deleted scenes
2008	A Bad Situation	Richard	Video
2011	Company	Peter	Filmed production
2011	The Change-Up	Valtan	
2011	Bad Seed	Bert	
2012	The Three Stooges	Mac Mioski	
2013	Louder Than Words	Eddie Stolzenberg	
2013	If I Had Wings	Geoff Taylor	
2016	Equity	Benji Akers	
2016	Catfight	The Talk Show Host	
2019	Fair Market Value	Lucas	
2021	Scenes from an Empty Church	The Sinner	
2021	Before I Go	Walt	
2025	D(e)ad	Daniel	
2026	The Debut	Steve	

=== Television ===
Year	Title	Role	Notes
1987	Roomies	Dale	Episode: "The Ditch"
1987	Our House	Douglas	Episode: "The Children's Crusade"
1987	ABC Afterschool Specials	Carl Warner	Episode: "The Day My Kid Went Punk"
1988	Amen	Bellman	Episode: "A Sight Case of Murder (2)"
1988	Eisenhower and Lutz	Waiter	Episode: "Don't Change a Hair for Me"
1989	The Young and the Restless	Greg	
1989	Newhart	Dirk	2 episodes
1989	Guns of Paradise	Johnny Ryan	2 episodes
1990	Sydney	Matt Keating	13 episodes
1990	Wings	Matt Sargent	Episode: "The Puppet Master"
1990	Murphy Brown	Alex	Episode: "Rootless People"
1991	Empty Nest	Fred	Episode: "The Man That Got Away"
1991	Baby Talk	Bill Noonan	Episode: "A Star Is Born"
1992	The Powers That Be	Joe Bowman	4 episodes
1992	Red Dwarf	Dave Lister	Unaired television pilot
1993	Bodies of Evidence	Thomas Wilkes	Episode: "Trial by Fire"
1993	Danielle Steel's Star	Spencer Hill	Television film
1994–1995	Madman of the People	B.J. Cooper	16 episodes
1995	Pride & Joy	Greg Sherman	6 episodes
1998	Mad About You	Gardner Mulloy	Episode: "Weekend in L.A."
2000	Ally McBeal	Dennis Martin	Episode: "In Search of Pygmies"
2001	Sex and the City	Ray King	2 episodes
2002	The Court	Harlan Brandt	
2003	Hench at Home	Terry Hench	Television film
2003, 2016	Law & Order: Special Victims Unit	Deputy Marshal Andy Eckerson, Bobby D'Amico	2 episodes
2005	Untitled David Diamond/David Weissman Project	Dylan	Television film
2006	The Great Malones		Episode: "Pilot"
2006–2007	Boston Legal	Jeffrey Coho	14 episodes
2007	Nip/Tuck	Bob Easton	Episode: "Carly Summers"
2008	Unhitched	Jack "Gator" Gately	6 episodes
2009	Head Case		Episode: "The Big Book"
2010	The Good Wife	Duke Roscoe	Episode: "Infamy"
2010	Damages	Terry Brooke	4 episodes
2010	The League	Craig O'Connor	Episode: "Bro-Lo El Cuñado"
2010–2011	The Temp Life	Eddie Chiapetta	3 episodes
2011	Suite 7	Alan	Episode: "Superman"
2011–2012	Leap Year	Andy Corvell	5 episodes
2011	Necessary Roughness	Ray Santino	2 episodes
2011	Easy to Assemble	Jebedehia Bateman	8 episodes
2011	The Mentalist	Doc Dugan	Episode: "The Redshirt"
2012	6 passi nel giallo	Harry Chase	Episode: "Visions of Murder"
2012, 2014	Hot in Cleveland	Donald	2 episodes
2012	Elementary	Jim Fowkes	Episode: "The Rat Race"
2013	Body of Proof	Dr. Derrick Malcolm	Episode: "Committed"
2013–2014	The Michael J. Fox Show	Bill	2 episodes
2013	Unforgettable	Marco Lantini	Episode: "A Moveable Feast"
2015–2018	UnREAL	Chet Wilton	38 episodes
2017	Kevin Can Wait	Peter	Episode: "The Back Out"
2017	Tin Star	Dermot O'Hanrahan	Episode: "Jack"
2018	Blue Bloods	Ray Cross	Episode: "Meet the New Boss"
2022	The Blacklist	The Chairman	Episode: "The Chairman (No. 171)"
2023	Sex/Life	Mick	4 episodes
2023	Julia	Ross Macdonald	Episode: "Loup en Croûte"
2024	Curb Your Enthusiasm	Man in Theatre	Episode: "The Gettysburg Address"
2025	Grey's Anatomy	Dr. Joseph Chase	Episode: "Love in the Ice Age"

=== Stage ===
Year	Title	Role	Notes
2000–2001	The Music Man	Harold Hill	Broadway; Theatre World Award; Nominee: Tony Award; Nominee: Drama Desk Award
2001–2002	Thou Shalt Not	Laurent LeClaire	Broadway
2004–2005	Modern Orthodox	Ben Jacobson	Off-Broadway
2009	Guys and Dolls	Sky Masterson	Broadway
2011	Company	Peter	New York Philharmonic Concert
2013	Matilda the Musical	Agatha Trunchbull	Broadway replacement
2022	Girl from the North Country	Mr. Burke	Broadway

== Awards and recognition ==
- Sexiest Broadway Star by People (2000)
- Tony Award for Best Actor in a Musical for The Music Man (nominee, 2000)
- Drama Desk Award for Outstanding Actor in a Musical for The Music Man (nominee, 2000)
- Outer Critics Circle Award for Best Actor in a Musical for The Music Man (nominee, 2000)
- Theatre World Award (winner, 2000)
- Broadway.com Audience Awards (winner, 2000)
- 100 Most Creative People in Entertainment "It" List, 2003 Entertainment Weekly
- Shorty Award for Humor (nominee, 2014)
