= Hartley Sawyer =

American actor

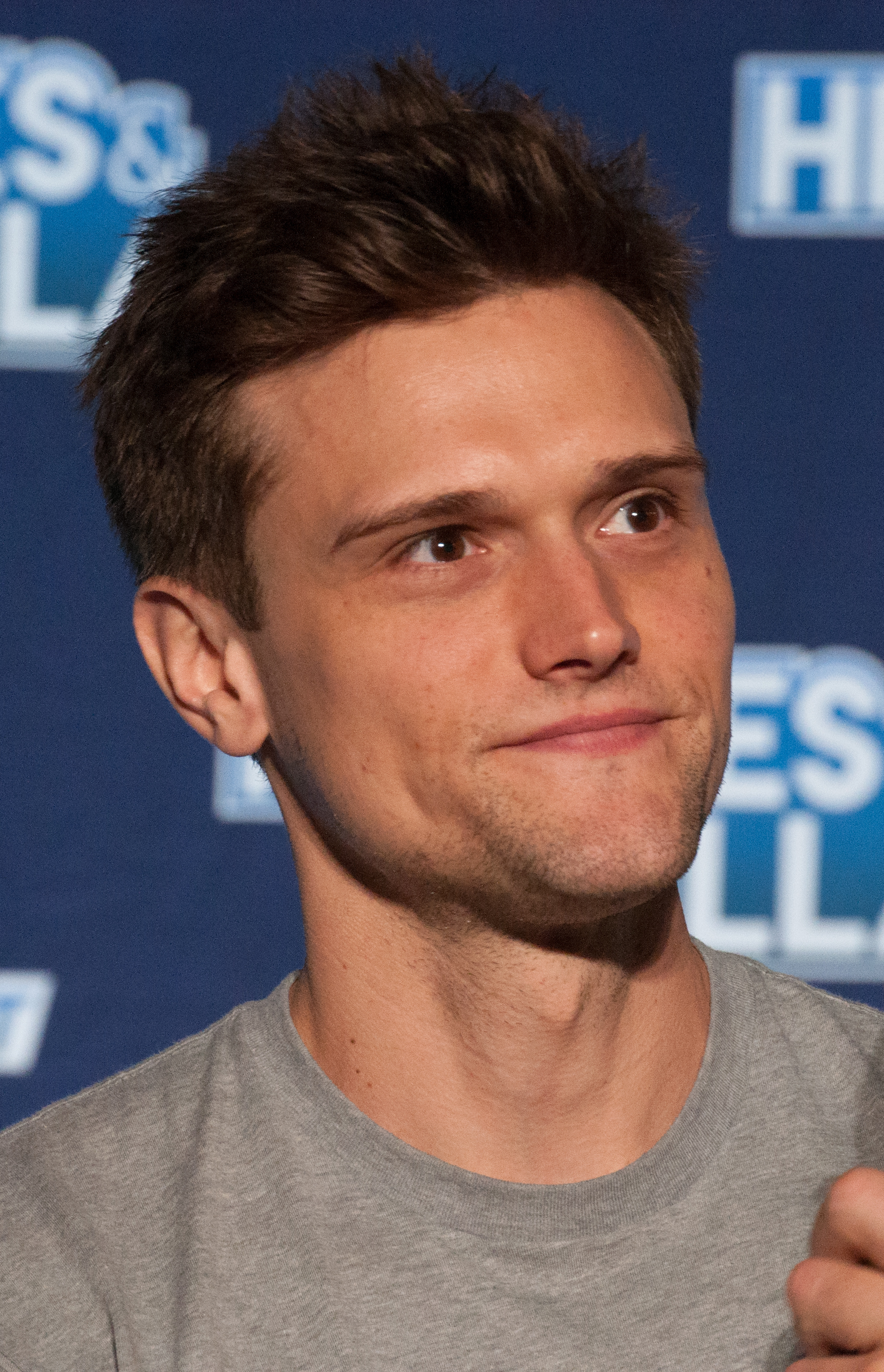
- Sawyer in 2018
- Born: January 25, 1985 (age 41); Goshen, New York, U.S.
- Occupation: Actor
- Years active: 2006–2020

Hartley Sawyer (born January 25, 1985) is an American former actor known for his roles as Brian Sommers on Glory Daze (2010–2011), Kyle Abbott on The Young and the Restless (2013–2014), and Ralph Dibny / Elongated Man on The Flash (2017–2020).

== Career ==
In March 2013, Sawyer was cast in the role of Kyle Abbott on the CBS Daytime soap opera The Young and the Restless. He made his debut on April 24, 2013. In December of the same year, it was announced that he would exit the role; he made his final appearance on January 27 the following year. In 2014, he starred in the thriller Kept Man, and the Geek & Sundry superhero comedy Caper. In 2015, Sawyer hosted and co-wrote the documentary series Courageous Leaders, and starred in the Wall Street drama SPiN.

In July 2017, Sawyer was cast in The CW's superhero drama The Flash as Ralph Dibny / Elongated Man, a fast-talking private investigator who is able to stretch his body to any shape or form. The character first appears in the fourth episode of the fourth season, titled "Elongated Journey Into Night", which first aired that October. In June of the following year, he was promoted to series regular.

In May 2020, Sawyer was fired after tweets from 2009–2014 that contained racist, misogynistic, and homophobic content resurfaced. He issued an apology, saying, "My words, irrelevant of being meant with an intent of humor, were hurtful, and unacceptable. I am ashamed I was capable of these really horrible attempts to get attention at that time. I regret them deeply." Sawyer deleted his Twitter account soon thereafter. A week later, he was fired from his role in The Flash, and has not worked in the entertainment industry since.

== Filmography ==
=== Film ===
Year	Title	Role	Notes
2006	Thursday	Andrew Kepling	
2006	Gizor & Gorm	Gizor	Short film
2008	Killian	Donovan	Short film
2010	Delmer Builds a Machine	Him	Short film
2013	The Blade Runner Holiday Special	Ron Batty	Short film
2014	Kept Man	Brian	Short film
2015	SPiN	Scott Angelus	Short film

=== Television ===
Year	Title	Role	Notes
2008–2009	I Am Not Infected	Hartley	Main cast; 27 episodes
2010–2011	Glory Daze	Brian Sommers	Main cast; 10 episodes
2012	Jane by Design	Brad	Episode: "The Birkin"
2012	GCB	Bozeman Peacham	3 episodes
2012	Don't Trust the B— in Apartment 23	Charles	Episode: "It's Just Sex..."
2013	NCIS: Los Angeles	Alan Sanderson	Episode: "History"
2013–2014	The Young and the Restless	Kyle Abbott	Role held: April 24, 2013 – January 27, 2014
2014	Suburgatory	Janitor	Episode: "Les Lucioles"
2015	The McCarthys	Daniel	Episode: "The Sister Act"
2015	Filthy Preppy Teens	Nathaniel	Episode: "The Island"
2016	Laura	Matthew/Priestley	2 episodes
2016	Single by 30	Scott	Episode: "Never Have I Ever"
2017–2020	The Flash	Ralph Dibny / Elongated Man	Recurring (season 4); Main (season 5–6); 50 episodes

=== Web ===
Year	Title	Role	Notes
2014	Caper	Dagr	Main cast; 9 episodes
2015	Courageous Leaders	Himself – Host	Also writer and producer; 6 episodes
2016	Miss 2059	Laheer	7 episodes
2017	Saving the Human Race	Joansey	6 episodes

== Accolades ==
Year	Award	Category	Nominated work	Result	Ref.
2018	Saturn Awards	Best Guest Starring Role on Television	The Flash	Nominated	
