= International Academy of Digital Arts and Sciences =

American commercial media company

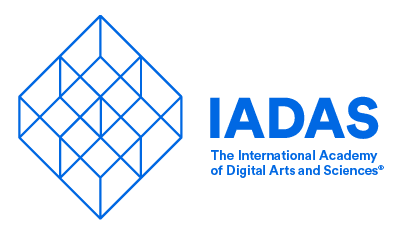
- Flat version of the 2024 logo, used as the primary on-screen logo as of 2024
- Country: United States
- Availability: Worldwide
- Founded: 1998; 28 years ago
- Revenue: ▲US $5 Million
- Headquarters: 22 W 21st St., Floor 7, New York, 100
- Key people: David-Michel Davies, CEO; Claire Graves, President; Denise Gilley, Academy Manager
- Official website: iadas.net

The International Academy of Digital Arts and Sciences (IADAS) is an organization that was founded in 1998 in New York City to recognize and acknowledge excellence in interactive content across emerging technologies. According to the organization, the academy was founded to help drive the creative, technical, and professional progress of the Internet and evolving forms of interactive and new media.

== History ==
The academy selects the nominees and winners for the Webby Awards and the Lovie Awards, which have been described as the leading honors for websites and individual achievement in technology and creativity. The Webby Awards have been described as the "Oscars of the Internet" in the media, and popular television series such as the Masterpiece has won the Webby Awards in 2017. In 2021, the academy also introduced the Anthem Awards to honor the purpose and mission-driven work of people, companies and organizations worldwide.

According to the IADAS website, their purpose is:

- To recognize and acknowledge excellence in interactive content across emerging technologies
- To connect a diverse group of luminaries to facilitate growth and development in the digital arts and sciences
- To educate industry professionals and the public-at-large about what is relevant, making technology accessible and integrating it into the general culture

In 2011, IADAS pinpointed five challenges the internet would face in the following five years in response to the exponential growth of the internet and its users. An article in Huffington Post described IADAS's perspective on the five challenges stating that the organization believed that the next five years had to see improvements in privacy protection, copyright law, net neutrality, the open web and Internet security."

== Members ==
Membership in the academy is by invitation only. IADAS describes its members as "Leading industry experts, evangelists, and visionaries working to advance the electronic medium" and divides its members into four types - Associate, Executive, Europe, and Anthem.

Executive members include Richard Branson, Vint Cerf, Arianna Huffington, Julia Child, Luvvie Ajayi, among many others.

Associate members include Sara Ackerman, Matthew Ball, Brian Edelman, Andrew Jackson, James Naleski, Mirko Pallera, Alok Shankar, among many others.

== Webby Awards ==
Established in 1996 during the Web's infancy, The Webbys is presented by the International Academy of Digital Arts and Sciences (IADAS)—a 2000+ member judging body. In 2006, The Webby Awards was described as the "Internet's Highest Honor" by the New York Times following the 10th annual Webby Awards that was hosted in the heart of New York's Financial District. This popular occasion had attendance from the executive director of UNICEF - Ann Veneman, Pop legend Prince among others.

Since then, the Webby awards have been honoring excellence on the internet in 8 major media types: Websites and Mobile Sites, Video, Advertising, Media & PR, Social, Apps, dApps & Software, Games, Podcasts, and Metaverse, Immersive & Virtual.

The Webby Awards presents two honors in every category—The Webby Award and The Webby People's Voice Award. Members of the International Academy of Digital Arts and Sciences (IADAS) select the Nominees for both awards in each category, as well as the Winners of The Webby Awards. In the spirit of the open Web, The Webby People's Voice is awarded by the voting public. Each year, The Webby People's Voice Awards garners millions of votes from all over the world. In April 2022, NASA won 3 Webby Awards, 5 People's Voice Awards with the awards being NASA's 24th, 25th, and 26th Webby Awards since 1998.

== Lovie Awards ==
In 2010, The Webby Awards launched its European sister award program, The Lovie Awards. The Lovie Awards recognizes the unique and resonant nature of the European Internet community – from Europe's top web and creative networks and content publishers to cultural and political organizations and individual creators. The Lovie Awards is the European counterpart to the Webby's, which honor contributions and contributors to the internet and digital media. The jury accepts work in many languages, including English, French, Spanish, Italian and German

The Lovie award winners get press coverage from leading media such as the Huffington Post, BBC, The Sunday Times among many others. The 2022 winner list included social media fame Khaby Lame and Jaap Haartsen among others.

== Anthem Awards ==
In 2021, The Webby Awards launched the brand new Anthem Awards to celebrate purpose & mission-driven work from people, companies and organizations worldwide, across seven core purposes: Diversity, Equity & Inclusion; Education, Art & Culture; Health; Human & Civil Rights; Humanitarian Action & Services; Responsible Technology; and Sustainability, Environment & Climate.

The Inaugural Anthem Awards presented Special Achievement Awards to a group of individuals who have dedicated their lives, platform or work to bring attention to some of the most important issues of our time. This list included members such as Jane Goodall, professional tennis player Naomi Osaka, comedian and filmmaker Adam McKay and American Soccer player Megan Rapinoe.
