= Kahnweiler =

Kahnweiler is a surname. Notable people with the surname include:

- Daniel-Henry Kahnweiler (1884–1979), German-born art dealer and collector
- Jessie Kahnweiler, American actress
- Louis S. Kahnweiler (1919–2017), American real estate investor
