= One Angry Man (film) =

2010 film

- Directed by: Peter LeDonne; Steven Moskovic
- Written by: Mark Dickerman; Jackie Mason; James Felder
- Produced by: Barry Avrich; Victor Castroll; Howard Koeppel; Mark Lacher; Steven Moskovic; Jyll Rosenfeld; Paul Turlick
- Starring: Jackie Mason; Jamie Colby; Tony Darrow; Raoul Felder; Mike Gallagher; Mark Levin
- Cinematography: Joe Livolsi
- Music by: John Kemp; Steve Sabaugh
- Release date: May 1, 2010
- Country: United States
- Language: English

One Angry Man is a 2010 American film starring Jackie Mason and directed by Peter LeDonne and Steven Moskovic.

== Premise ==
Jackie Mason stars as himself in a feature-length courtroom dramedy inspired by the Henry Fonda film 12 Angry Men.

== Cast ==
- Jackie Mason as Himself
- Raoul Felder as Himself
- Mike Gallagher as Prosecutor
- Mark Levin as Judge F. Lee Levin
- Jamie Colby as Alternate Juror
- Tony Darrow as Bobby
