= Illeana Douglas =

American actress and filmmaker

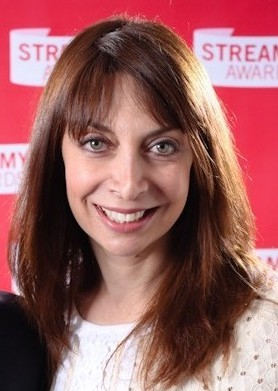
- Douglas in 2009
- Born: Illeana Hesselberg; July 25, 1961 (age 65); New Haven, Connecticut, U.S.
- Occupations: Actress; filmmaker
- Years active: 1987–present
- Spouse: Jonathan Axelrod (m. 1998; div. 2001)
- Partner(s): Martin Scorsese (1989–1997)
- Relatives: Melvyn Douglas (grandfather)
- Website: illeanadouglas.com

Illeana Hesselberg (/ˌɪliˈɑːnə/ IL-ee-AH-nə; born July 25, 1961), known professionally as Illeana Douglas, is an American actress and filmmaker. Following her screen debut with a small part in Hello Again (1987), she went on to appear in a variety of mainstream and independent features throughout the 1990s, such as Goodfellas (1990), Cape Fear (1991), Alive (1993), To Die For (1995), Grace of My Heart (1996), Chasing Amy, Picture Perfect (both 1997), Happy, Texas; Message in a Bottle; and Stir of Echoes (all 1999). Her other credits include The Next Best Thing (2000), Ghost World (2001), Dummy (2002), Factory Girl (2006), She's Funny That Way (2014), and Return to Sender (2015).

Outside film, Douglas won the Satellite Award for Best Actress for her starring role as Wendy Ward on the short-lived sitcom Action (1999). She appeared as Angela on the first season of Six Feet Under (2001), receiving a nomination for the Primetime Emmy for Outstanding Guest Actress, and played the recurring role of Gina Bernardo on Law & Order: SVU (2002–2003). Her other work includes Easy to Assemble (2008–2012), a web series she created, wrote, and starred in. Douglas appears regularly on Turner Classic Movies, hosting specials focused on female filmmakers throughout history.

== Early life ==
Douglas was born on July 25, 1961 in New Haven, Connecticut, the daughter of Joan Douglas (née Georgescu), a schoolteacher, and Gregory Hesselberg (1926–2017), a painter. Douglas's father was the son of Hollywood actor Melvyn Douglas and his wife, the artist Rosalind Hightower. Douglas had two older brothers, Stefan Gregor Hesselberg (1958–2007), a technician in the histology laboratory at the Massachusetts Institute of Technology who also trained racehorses in Verona, Italy, and Erik Hesselberg, a journalist. Douglas along with her siblings are Mayflower descendants through their father's side.

Douglas grew up primarily in Old Saybrook, Connecticut, and has said that she was also raised in many other cities, in Massachusetts where her father lived, Connecticut where her mother lived, and New York, where her extended family lived. During her childhood she spent time going back and forth between relatives during the summer. Douglas said that her parents were heavily influenced by the 1970s hippie culture—her father especially by the movie Easy Rider. They had a loose parenting style and did not pressure her to go to college. Comedy albums were popular in her family. They would put on dramatic interpretations and performances.

Douglas's mother's side is Roman Catholic—Italian and Romanian from Astoria, Queens. Her maternal grandmother worked in the restaurant at Gertz department store in Astoria; her maternal grandfather was a welder. Douglas said that her maternal grandmother, a former Rockette, had wanted to be an actor. She instilled in Douglas a love for the movies, which they attended together frequently when she was a child.

As a child she would visit her paternal grandfather, the actor Melvyn Douglas, in his apartment in Manhattan on the Upper West Side as well as at his home in the Hollywood Hills section of Los Angeles. Douglas said that during her summers with her grandfather, he introduced her to his interests, which included theater, elocution, reading, art, and history.

Douglas has said that her grandfather's Oscar-winning performance in Being There (1979), which starred Peter Sellers, was influential on her own career. Melvyn Douglas and Peter Sellers both served in the military during WWII and met in Burma. In the 1960s, the two actors reconnected in London and reminisced about their time together in the war. During high school, Douglas visited her grandfather on the set of Being There while shooting on location in Asheville, North Carolina and met Sellers, whose work she admired greatly. It was her first time on a film set. She graduated from Haddam-Killingworth High School in Higganum, Connecticut in 1979.

Douglas notes the contrast between her working-class Italian roots and the glamorous Hollywood world of her paternal side of the family. Famous people including Myrna Loy, Gore Vidal, Gloria Steinem, politicians, writers, and others were often present, in a salon-like environment. Douglas has said it took her a long time to reconcile the different lifestyles she was exposed to in her youth. She identifies more with the Italian side of her family, and has said that she developed more of their "rhythms and ways" due to the amount of time she spent with them in Queens.

== Career ==
=== Early career ===
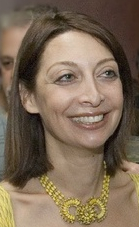
Douglas, June 24, 2007

After graduating from high school, Douglas moved to New York City. Having been interested in movies from her childhood, Douglas wanted to be in show business. She stayed with relatives in various temporary arrangements. Douglas attended American Academy of Dramatic Arts, where she was a contemporary of Elias Koteas and Lou Mustillo. Following their first year, Mustillo and Douglas were not invited back to the school.

When she was 18 years old, Douglas went to work for Steve Rubell at the Morgans Hotel. While there, Douglas decided to reinvent herself, and began attending Neighborhood Playhouse School of the Theatre, where she studied with the acting teacher Richard Pinter. While she was working in a sketch comedy group called Manhattan Punchline, one of the troupe members suggested she try stand-up comedy. Douglas worked briefly at Stand Up New York, and found the writing and acting easy, but found the performing difficult. She did not like the raw comedy style then in vogue, and did not enjoy the lifestyle of a standup comic.

Douglas began working for a well-known publicist, Peggy Siegal. Through this position, she tried to send her headshot to Martin Scorsese's casting director, but was not successful. At that time, Scorsese was editing his film Last Temptation of Christ in an office down the hall from Siegal's offices. The editors needed a sound effect to convey Mary Magdalene screaming, and asked her to help out. In this way, Douglas met Scorsese, his editor, Thelma Schoonmaker, as well as filmmaker Michael Powell, and provided many automated dialogue replacement (ADR) of crowd sounds. The group bonded over discussion of old films, which was a long-standing interest. Scorsese and Douglas eventually began a long-term relationship.

Soon afterwards, she got her first movie role: a small part in Scorsese's segment of New York Stories. Douglas said that Lorraine Bracco took Douglas under her wing during the shooting of Scorsese's Goodfellas, helping her to find an agent. It was then that Douglas became Scorsese's girlfriend.

Douglas appeared in Scorsese's Cape Fear (1991) – one of four Scorsese films in which she has appeared. After Cape Fear, she had several film roles where her character was eventually cut, including in Household Saints, Jungle Fever, and Quiz Show. "It was kind of depressing," she commented.

Douglas acted in a low-budget movie called Grief that was accepted into Sundance, which led to her meeting director Allison Anders.

=== Feature work ===
Douglas had a supporting role in 1995's To Die For, a film that boosted her career in which the director Gus Van Sant taught her about the technical aspects of filmmaking, such as camera blocking, film lenses, and modulating a performance for film. It was also a movie where she felt that the Meisner technique she learned at the Neighborhood Playhouse started to connect for her.

Douglas and Allison Anders wanted to collaborate on a film, and began work on a biography of Anne Sexton, which never came to fruition. As they were both interested in music, Douglas suggested a movie about the personalities of the Brill Building, where she had worked. This led to her first starring role as singer-songwriter Denise Waverly in Anders' 1996 film, Grace of My Heart.

She had another supporting role in Ghost World (2001).

In 2016, Douglas appeared opposite Sean Astin in the independent feature film, Unleashed.

=== Television work ===
On television, Douglas appeared in a memorable role as one of Garry Shandling's love interests towards the end of the series, The Larry Sanders Show, in 1998. In 1999, she had a starring role opposite Jay Mohr in the series Action. She played a television executive who started out as a prostitute who had Mohr as a regular customer.

She guest starred on Seinfeld, Frasier and The Drew Carey Show, and has played a public defender on several episodes of Law & Order: Special Victims Unit in 2002 and 2003. She appeared in two episodes of the HBO TV series Six Feet Under, both of which earned Emmy nominations for Guest Actress in a Drama. She appeared as Mrs. Ari's sister Marci in the Season 7 finale of Entourage.

In 2006, she starred in the Lifetime TV film Not Like Everyone Else and played herself in Pittsburgh opposite Jeff Goldblum. In 2007, Douglas was added to the cast of Ugly Betty, playing Sheila, an editor for MODE magazine.

Douglas spent time in Sweden shooting a TV show called Welcome to Sweden, which was produced by Amy Poehler and also starred Greg Poehler and Lena Olin. The series was a Swedish-American co-production that aired on Swedish TV as well as on NBC.

=== Writing and producing ===
Douglas has written and directed a comedy short The Perfect Woman (1993) (a satire about what men really want from women), the documentary Everybody Just Stay Calm—Stories in Independent Filmmaking (1994), and the satire Boy Crazy, Girl Crazier (1995). She has been the producer for several projects including Illeanarama, a collection of her short films for the Sundance Channel.

From 2008 to 2012, Douglas starred in a web series sponsored by IKEA called Easy to Assemble, where she plays herself as an actor-in-recovery-from-acting who goes to work at IKEA. Douglas said that she had a great deal of autonomy from sponsor IKEA, whose only condition was that the show be suitable for children and families. It was canceled after 4 seasons.

In 2015, Douglas produced and developed a series for Joey Soloway called The Skinny.

=== Turner Classic Movies ===
Douglas worked on a Turner Classic Movies series called Friday Night Spotlight, a prime-time show featuring a month-long festival of movies programmed by special guests. The season that she worked on focused on the theme "Second Looks". Douglas said that curating, writing, and working on this series allowed her to use her movie knowledge while making it funny, entertaining, and informative.

In 2015, in association with the advocacy group, Women in Film, Douglas presented a month-long series on the TCM cable channel called "Trailblazing Women," an initiative to highlight women's contributions to the art of cinema. Douglas became involved in the project when she found out that the American Film Institute's list of 100 greatest American movies didn't include any movies directed by women. The series was also in response to active discussions about the gender imbalance in Hollywood. The series will present work by female pioneers like Dorothy Arzner, Alice Guy-Blaché, Agnès Varda, Lina Wertmüller, as well as interviews with Allison Anders, Amy Heckerling, Julie Dash, and others. The series will be a multi-year event, with the first year's focus on women directors from the 1920s to the present. Each night is themed, with programming topics from foreign films to African-American filmmakers.

=== Other work ===
- In Spärhusen, a spinoff series from Easy to Assemble, Douglas plays Beirget Kattsson, a member of a band called Spärhusen, a Swedish pop group. Douglas describes them: "Spärhusen has had their ups and downs over the years. They’ve been in many plane crashes, but they’ve survived and they’re together."
- At the Walt Disney World Resort in the Disney's Hollywood Studios theme park, Douglas plays Aerosmith's manager in the preshow video for the Rock 'n' Roller Coaster attraction. She later appeared in an Aerosmith music video as Liv Tyler's mother.
- Douglas and the comedian Sarah Sweet produced and co-starred in a series professional variety shows called The Living Room Show, that is hosted in various Los Angeles living rooms.

In 2015 Douglas published a memoir called I Blame Dennis Hopper which was released through Flatiron Books. In the memoir, Douglas tells about her life via her love for the movies and her exposure to Hollywood through her paternal grandfather Melvyn Douglas. Not long after the book's release, she began a podcast with the same title.

== Personal life ==
From 1989 until 1997, Douglas was in a relationship with director Martin Scorsese.

On May 16, 1998, she married producer and writer Jonathan Axelrod, the stepson of producer George Axelrod; they divorced in 2001. Douglas said that the period after her divorce was difficult both emotionally and financially, and that she relocated from living in Los Angeles to the New York area, where she took classes at her former school, the Neighborhood Playhouse, and worked in theater. She also began writing and directing.

Douglas is a vegetarian. She was named after Princess Ileana of Romania.

== Works and publications ==
- I Blame Dennis Hopper: And Other Stories from a Life Lived in and Out of the Movies. New York: Flatiron Books. 2015. ISBN 978-1-250-05291-9. OCLC 912507695.
- curator: Shelley Stamp; producer: Bret Wood; executive producer: Illeana Douglas (2018). Pioneers: First Women Filmmakers (boxset). New York, NY: Kino Classics; Library of Congress. "Blu-ray DVD book" OCLC 1077206039 OCLC 1100589636 OCLC 1206364129
- Connecticut in the Movies: From Dream Houses to Dark Suburbia. New York: Rowman & Littlefield. 2023. ISBN 978-1-493-08088-5.
- Jungle Red!: The Making of MGM's The Women. Connecticut: Lyons Press. 2026. ISBN 978-1-493-09394-6.

== Filmography ==
=== Film ===
Year	Title	Role	Notes
1987	Hello Again	Mother in park	
1988	The Last Temptation of Christ	Crowd member	
1989	New York Stories	Paulette's friend	
1990	Goodfellas	Rosie	
1991	Guilty by Suspicion	Nan	
1991	Cape Fear	Lori Davis	
1993	Alive	Liliana Methol	
1993	Household Saints	Evelyn Santangelo	
1993	Grief	Leslie	
1994	Quiz Show	Woman at book party	
1995	Search and Destroy	Marie Davenport	
1995	Judgement	Laurel	Short
1995	To Die For	Janice Maretto	Nominated—Saturn Award for Best Supporting Actress
1996	Wedding Bell Blues	Jasmine	
1996	Grace of My Heart	Denise Waverly	
1997	Picture Perfect	Darcy O'Neil	
1997	Hacks	Georgia Feckler	
1998	The Thin Pink Line	Julia Bullock	
1999	Flypaper	Laura	
1999	Stir of Echoes	Lisa Weil	
1999	Happy, Texas	Doreen Schaefer	
1999	Message in a Bottle	Lina Paul	Nominated—Blockbuster Entertainment Award for Favorite Supporting Actress – Drama
1999	Rock 'n' Roller Coaster	Band manager	Short
2000	The Next Best Thing	Elizabeth Ryder	
2001	Ghost World	Roberta Allsworth	
2002	Dummy	Heidi Schoichet	
2002	The New Guy	Kiki Pierce	
2002	The Adventures of Pluto Nash	Dr. Mona Zimmer	
2003	The Kiss	Joyce Rothman	
2003	Missing Brendan	Julie Conroy	
2005	Alchemy	KJ	
2005	The Californians	Olive Ransom	
2006	Factory Girl	Diana Vreeland	
2006	The Bondage	Elaine Edwards	
2007	Walk the Talk	Jill	
2007	Order Up	Waitress	Short
2007	Osso Bucco	Megan	
2007	Expired	Wilman	
2008	The Year of Getting to Know Us	Christine Jacobson	
2008	Otis	Kate Lawson	
2009	April Showers	Sally Reedman	
2009	Life Is Hot in Cracktown	Mommy	
2010	Spärhusen Plays The Egyptian	Beirget Kattson	Short
2011	The Green	Trish	
2011	Knots	Miriam	
2013	Monarch	Lindsey Teller	Short
2013	Chez Upshaw	Rita Upshaw	
2013	Dark Around the Stars	Dayton	
2013	Max Rose	Jenny Flowers	
2013	A Country Christmas	Susan Satcher	
2013	It's Dark Here	Linda Tennies	
2014	The Boxcar Children	Mary Moore (voice)	
2014	Sister	Aunt Connie	
2014	Outlook Not So Good	Mom	Short
2014	She's Funny That Way	Judy	
2015	All Stars	Billie	
2015	Road Hard	Kim Madsen	
2015	Pearly Gates	Karen Weiner	
2015	Mega Shark Versus Kolossus	Dr. Alison Gray	
2015	Return to Sender	Judy	
2016	The Late Bloomer	Linda	
2016	Unleashed	Monty	
2024	In Fidelity	Ethel	

=== Television ===
Year	Title	Role	Notes
1995	Homicide: Life on the Street	Gina Doolen	Episode: "Autofocus"
1995	The Single Guy	Martha	Episode: "Sister"
1997	Weapons of Mass Distraction	Rita Pasco	Television movie
1997	Rough Riders	Edith Roosevelt	Television movie
1997	Bella Mafia	Teresa Scorpio Luciano	Television movie
1998	Seinfeld	Loretta	Episode: "The Strongbox"
1998	The Larry Sanders Show	Herself	2 episodes
1999	Brother's Keeper	Ginny	Episode: "Dating the Teacher"
1999	Lansky	Anna Lansky	Television movie
1999–2000	Action	Wendy Ward	13 episodes Satellite Award for Best Actress – Television Series Musical or Comedy
2001	Frasier	Mrs. Daly	Episode: "Hungry Heart"
2001	The Drew Carey Show	Rachel Murray	2 episodes
2001–2005	Six Feet Under	Angela	3 episodes Nominated—Primetime Emmy Award for Outstanding Guest Actress in a Drama Series
2002	Point of Origin	Kate	Television movie
2002–2003	Law & Order: Special Victims Unit	Gina Bernardo	3 episodes
2006	Crumbs	Shelley	3 episodes
2006	Not Like Everyone Else	Toni Blackbear	Television movie
2006–2007	Shark	Gloria Dent	2 episodes
2007	Ugly Betty	Sheila	3 episodes
2008	Law & Order: Criminal Intent	Beverly Tyson	Episode: "Contract"
2010–2011	Entourage	Marcie	2 episodes
2011	The Cape	Netta Stilton	2 episodes
2011	Chaos	Linda Phillips	Episode: "Two Percent"
2013	Maron	Herself	Episode: "Dominatrix"
2013	Drop Dead Diva	Dr. Reza	Episode: "The Kiss"
2013	CSI: Crime Scene Investigation	Ruby Banks	Episode: "Passed Pawns"
2013	Grey's Anatomy	Dr. Alma	Episode: "Man on the Moon"
2014–2015	Welcome to Sweden	Nancy	6 episodes
2015	Chasing Life	Mariann Russo	2 episodes
2016	Modern Family	Janet	Episode: "Double Click"
2019	The Simpsons	New Age Clerk (voice)	Episode: "Crystal Blue-Haired Persuasion"
2019	Goliath	Rita	7 episodes
2019	All Rise	Beatrix Rycroft	Episode: "Dripsy"
2020–2021	Shrill	Sheila	3 episodes
2022	Search Party	Annabelle	Episode: "The Gospel of Judas"

=== Web series ===
Year	Title	Role	Notes
2008–2012	Easy to Assemble	Illeana	48 episodes
2010–2011	The Temp Life	Eve Randall	5 episodes
2010	The Webventures of Justin and Alden	Herself	Episode: "1760"
2010	Suite 7	Livvy	Episode: "Soulmates"
2016	The Skinny	Jacqueline	5 episodes
