= Poehler =

Poehler (/ˈpoʊlər/ POH-lər) is a surname. Notable people with the surname include:

- Amy Poehler (born 1971), American actress and comedian, sister of Greg
- Greg Poehler (born 1974), American actor and comedian, brother of Amy
- Henry Poehler (1833–1912), German-born representative from Minnesota in 1872
