= Laura Wasser =

American lawyer (born 1968)

- Born: Laura Allison Wasser; 1968 (age 57–58); Los Angeles, California, U.S.
- Other name: The Disso Queen
- Education: University of California, Berkeley; Loyola Marymount University
- Occupation: Attorney
- Children: 2

Laura Allison Wasser (born 1968) is an American attorney specialising in divorce and known for her celebrity clients. She currently is chief of divorce evolution for Divorce.com.

== Early life and education ==
Wasser graduated from Beverly Hills High School in 1986. She earned a B.A. degree in rhetoric from University of California, Berkeley, and earned a J.D. degree from Loyola Law School in 1994. She has been a member of the California Bar since December 1994.

== Career ==
Wasser joined her father Dennis Wasser's family law firm Wasser Cooperman & Mandles, where she is now managing partner. Wasser was also the founder and CEO of the online divorce service It's Over Easy, which sought to allow people to handle divorces with less professional help. It's Over Easy was acquired by Divorce.com in 2022, and Wasser was brought on as chief of divorce evolution for the company. Wasser hosts the podcasts "All's Fair With Laura Wasser" on iHeart Radio and "Divorce Sucks! With Laura Wasser" on PodcastOne.

Wasser has handled a number of high-profile, high-net-worth dissolutions, including those for Angelina Jolie, Heidi Klum, Kim Kardashian, Kris Jenner, Johnny Depp, Ryan Reynolds, Christina Aguilera, Hilary Duff, Stevie Wonder, Kelis, Patricia Arquette, Kate Walsh, Johnny Knoxville, Jimmy Iovine Maria Shriver, Olivier Martinez, Kelly Clarkson, Dr. Dre, Kevin Costner, and Hila Klein.

Alongside her father, Wasser served as an on-set legal consultant for the movie Liar Liar. She and her father also appeared in the 2014 documentary Divorce Corp. She has been called upon on TV, in print and across the media landscape in matters regarding divorce and family law.

== Personal life ==
Wasser has two sons with two former boyfriends whom she did not marry. She divorced a different man in 1993 and she has not married again since, stating that she does not believe in lifelong monogamy or the government aspect of marriage. She resides in Los Angeles.

Wasser is Jewish.

== Awards and honors ==
In June 2008, Wasser received the Harriett Buhai Center for Family Law Zephyr M. Ramsey Award and in 2011, she was the recipient of the Century City Chamber of Commerce Women of Achievement Award. In 2013, Wasser received the Brady Center Advocate Award. In May 2019, she received the Justice Award from the Los Angeles Center for Law and Justice for her acknowledgment of the struggles faced by the self-represented and for her work in promoting civility in family law. Wasser has been selected to Super Lawyers every year since 2007, and has been featured on The Hollywood Reporter’s Power Lawyer Troubleshooters.

== Bibliography ==
- It Doesn't Have to Be That Way: How to Divorce Without Destroying Your Family or Bankrupting Yourself (St. Martin's Press, 2013)

== See also ==
- Raoul Felder
- James Sexton (attorney)
