= Christmas Icetastrophe =

2014 film directed by Jonathan Winfrey

- Genre: Disaster film
- Written by: David Sanderson
- Directed by: Jonathan Winfrey
- Starring: Victor Webster; Jennifer Spence
- Music by: Michael Neilson
- Country of origin: United States
- Original language: English

Production
- Executive producers: Tom Berry; Lisa Hansen; Paul Hertzberg
- Cinematography: Christopher A. Smith
- Editor: Garrett Griffin
- Running time: 80 minutes
- Production companies: CineTel Films; Reel One Entertainment

Original release
- Network: Syfy
- Release: December 20, 2014

Christmas Icetastrophe (also titled Icetastrophe) is a 2014 American made for television disaster film directed by Jonathan Winfrey. It first aired on Syfy on December 20, 2014. Victor Webster and Jennifer Spence star as survivors of a meteorite strike that causes their town to flash freeze.

== Plot ==
A meteorite splits and one piece lands on a car in the small town of Lennox; the other piece in the mountains outside town. The town begins to progressively flash freeze, and the effect spreads outward at an alarming rate. Charlie Ratchet, a local father, teams up with Alex Novak, a graduate student who wants to study the meteorite. Together they set out to counter the effects of the freezing meteorite on their town before everything, and every one, ends up frozen. Meanwhile, Tim Ratchet, Charlie's son, goes out into the storm to find and rescue Marley Crooge, and the two fight to survive the cold to make it back to safety.

== Cast ==
- Victor Webster as Charlie Ratchet
- Jennifer Spence as Alex Novak
- Richard Harmon as Tim Ratchet
- Tiera Skovbye as Marley Crooge
- Mike Dopud as Ben Crooge
- Johannah Newmarch as Krystal Crooge
- Andrew Francis as Scott Crooge
- Ben Cotton as Mayor Gibbons
- Boti Bliss as Faye Ratchet
- Jonathon Young as Neil
- Tyler Johnston as TJ
- Alex Zahara as Miles
- Andrew Dunbar as Corporal Lambert
- Lane Edwards as Rob
- Toby Levins as Cole
- John Stewart as Gary
- Jason Burkart as Man

== Release ==
Christmas Icetastrophe premiered December 20, 2014, on Syfy.

== Reception ==
Neil Genzlinger of The New York Times called it "mindlessly ridiculous" but amusing. Adam Smith of the Boston Herald rated it C+ and wrote, "Just like its title, the film is unbelievably hokey, but it's also got campy appeal that sci-fi (and Syfy) fans will find irresistible." Nancy deWolf Smith of The Wall Street Journal wrote that it "sometimes reaches a very satisfying level of scariness".

The trailer was nominated for "Trashiest Trailer" by the Golden Trailer Awards.
