= Crystal Blue-Haired Persuasion =

- The Simpsons episode
- Episode no.: Season 30; Episode 23
- Directed by: Matthew Faughnan
- Written by: Megan Amram
- Production code: YABF16
- Original air date: May 12, 2019

Guest appearances
- Illeana Douglas as the New Age Clerk; Werner Herzog as Walter Hotenhoffer; Jenny Slate as Piper Paisley

Episode features
- Chalkboard gag: "I will not shirk my responsibilities" (during the episode)
- Couch gag: Marge, Lisa, Bart and Maggie rush in only to find the entire living room, couch and TV in 3D clay-like forms, Marge feels the effects of the couch as if it was wrapping paper. Homer runs and tears through the living room background revealing the background (including the couch) as a tearable wallpaper and Homer says "D'oh!" in response.

Episode chronology
| ← Previous "Woo-Hoo Dunnit?" | Next → "The Winter of Our Monetized Content" |
- The Simpsons season 30

"Crystal Blue-Haired Persuasion" is the twenty-third and final episode of the thirtieth season of the American animated television series The Simpsons, and the 662nd episode overall. The episode was directed by Matthew Faughnan and written by Megan Amram. It aired in the United States on Fox on May 12, 2019.

In this episode, Marge sells crystals when it appears they helped Bart do well in school. Illeana Douglas, Werner Herzog, and Jenny Slate guest starred. It received negative reviews.

== Plot ==
Due to a slight fall in profits at the nuclear plant, Mr. Burns cancels the employee's children's health care. Because the town's approval of corporate tax cuts prevents anyone from getting government health care, Bart is forced to switch to a generic medicine for his attention deficit disorder, which results in odd side effects. Dr. Nick is no help with the situation, but at a crystal shop, FAO Quartz, Marge and Bart discover blue healing crystals, and she decides to use these to supplement his treatment. Three weeks later Bart takes home an "A" on a paper, demonstrating the powers of the crystals.

When word of Bart's academic success spreads throughout the town's parents, who want to use the crystals for personal means, Marge goes to buy more crystals, but the shop is closing, and the owner gives Marge the entire inventory, while she joins a new cult. Marge opens her own crystal shop, Ye Olde New Age Store, out of the garage, and begins a thriving business. When materials start to run out, Lindsey Naegle appears and offers to expand her business, renaming it to Murmur. Lisa is skeptical about the powers, while Piper Paisley, the owner of a healing beauty relaxorium in Shelbyville, Plop, menaces Marge to get out of the business. Marge, ignoring Homer's concerns, decides to open up a Murmur kiosk at the Shelbyville Mall next to Plop.

At the school, Lisa investigates Bart's recent papers and discovers that Bart has hidden crib notes in the drawings around the classroom, which only the crystals reveal. She convinces Bart to confess to Marge, as he is betraying the one person who has treated him with love and affection. When Bart confesses to Marge that he cheated and Marge's customers angrily tell her the crystals did not work, Marge realizes that the crystals only made people's lives worse, so closes down Murmur and concedes to Piper, much to Piper's relief. She also tells Homer, who has quit his job due to Marge's success and taken on the role of a stereotypical stay-at-home spouse, to get back to work at the power plant.

In the tag scene, Marge visits the former owner of FAO Quartz at the cult to check up on her. The woman takes the opportunity to escape the cult with Marge. As they drive off in Marge's car, the cult owner blows up the bridge in an attempt to stop them from escaping.

== Production ==
In April 2019, it was reported that Jenny Slate was cast as rival store owner Piper. Illeana Douglas and Werner Herzog were also cast as guest stars.

== Cultural references ==
The stores that Marge and Piper run are parodies of Gwyneth Paltrow's company goop.

During Homer and Marge's dream sequence, the Road Runner from Looney Tunes appears in which he is attacked and eaten by Homer's spirit guide Space Coyote.

The episode title is a play on Tommy James and the Shondells's song "Crystal Blue Persuasion", which plays in the episode.

== Reception ==
=== Viewing figures ===
"Crystal Blue-Haired Persuasion" scored a 0.5 rating with a 3 share and was watched by 1.5 million people.

=== Critical response ===
Dennis Perkins of The A.V. Club gave the episode a B−, stating, "’Crystal Blue-Haired Persuasion’ left me feeling tired. Not because it's a bad episode, necessarily—it's above average, as far as a season 30 episode of The Simpsons goes. The overall feeling left after this 30th Simpsons season finale is more one of rueful resignation that, for all the show's pedigree, its occasional flashes of former glory, and the ever-hopeful optimism of the lifelong fan, the long-awaited Simpsons renaissance is just never going to come."

Tony Sokol of Den of Geek gave the episode 2.5 out of 5 stars. He stated that the episode was "too balanced to be truly effective." He disliked the jokes stemming from the new age store products, but highlighted the commentary on health care.
