= Priscilla Faia =

Canadian actress

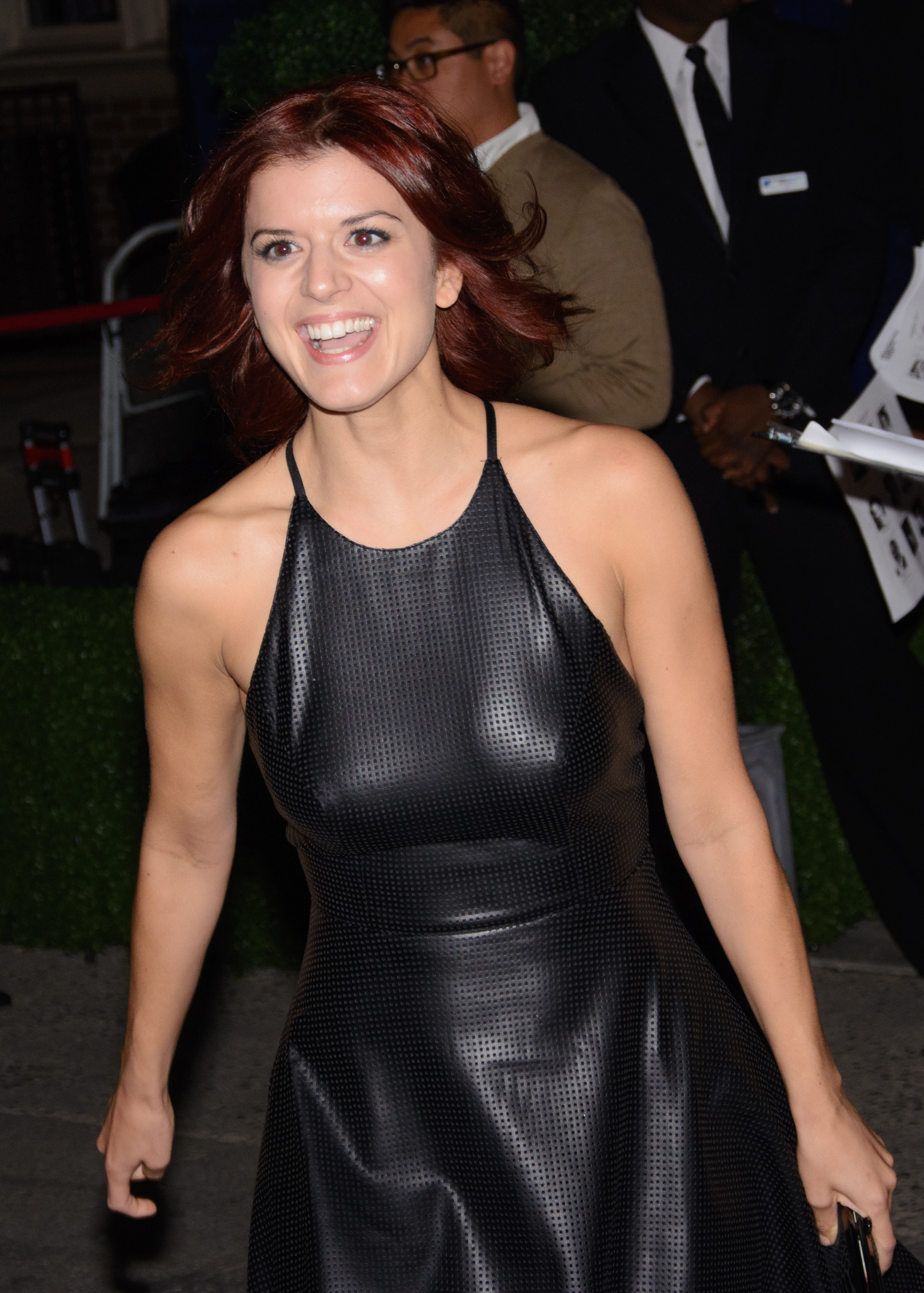
- Faia arriving for the Hollywood Foreign Press Association & InStyle's 2014 TIFF Celebration
- Born: October 23, 1985 (age 40); Victoria, British Columbia, Canada
- Occupations: Actress, writer
- Years active: 2007–present

Priscilla Faia (born October 23, 1985) is a Canadian film and television actress and writer. She is best known for her roles in the short films After the Riots (2009) and Method (2013) and the 2010 television show Rookie Blue as the character Chloe Price. Her acting in Rookie Blue was nominated in 2014 for a Canadian Screen Award for Best Performance by an Actress in a Featured Supporting Role in a Dramatic Program or Series. She also starred in the television show You Me Her as Isabelle "Izzy" Silva.

In 2013, she played the part of "Poppy" in the TV comedy W.O.S., for which she also wrote the script.

== Background ==
Born in Victoria, British Columbia. Faia was signed by a talent agent at the age of 8 and began taking classes at the Screen Actors Studio in Victoria by the time she was 9. After moving to Vancouver at the age of 22 Faia found some acting work in commercials and a small role in the Steven Seagal miniseries True Justice. During this time she studied under Matthew Harrison at the Actor's Foundry. She was also a server at the world famous Cactus Club Cafe.

== Canadian Charity Challenge ==
In May 2013, Faia went with several other Rookie Blue coworkers to Machu Picchu, Peru to support UNICEF. Together with her coworkers (Charlotte Sullivan and Peter Mooney), she trekked throughout Peru for nine days by camping and cooking in the poor areas of the Andes. She attended educational programs held by UNICEF and learned about their efforts to protect and save children living in the rural communities. She was a part of the first Canadian "Charity Challenge" to Machu Picchu

== Rookie Blue ==
Faia's first major role in television was as Chloe Price in the TV series Rookie Blue. She debuted in the second episode of season 4, when she got close with Dov (played by Gregory Smith) at a bar. She was then introduced in the third episode as character Frank Best's (Lyriq Bent) goddaughter.

== Filmography ==
Acting credits for Priscilla Faia
Year	Title	Role	Notes
2013–2015	Rookie Blue	Chloe Price	Main role (Seasons 4–6); Nominated – Canadian Screen Award for Best Performance by an Actress in a Featured Supporting Role in a Dramatic Program or Series (2014)
2014	Seed	Sandra	Episode: "The Bjorn Identity"
2015	My One Christmas Wish	Kate	Best friend of the main character
2016	Motive	Lori Schultz	Episode: "The Vanishing Policeman"
2016–2020	You Me Her	Isabelle "Izzy" Silva	Main role (Seasons 1–5); Nominated – UBCP/ACTRA Awards for Best Actress (2016); Nominated – Leo Award for Best Lead Performance by a Female in a Dramatic Series (2017)
2021	The Good Doctor	Dr. Cintia D'Souza	Episode: "Irresponsible Salad Bar Practices"
2025	Law & Order Toronto: Criminal Intent	Jade Lancaster	Episode: White Squirrel City
