= Jennifer Spence =

Canadian actress

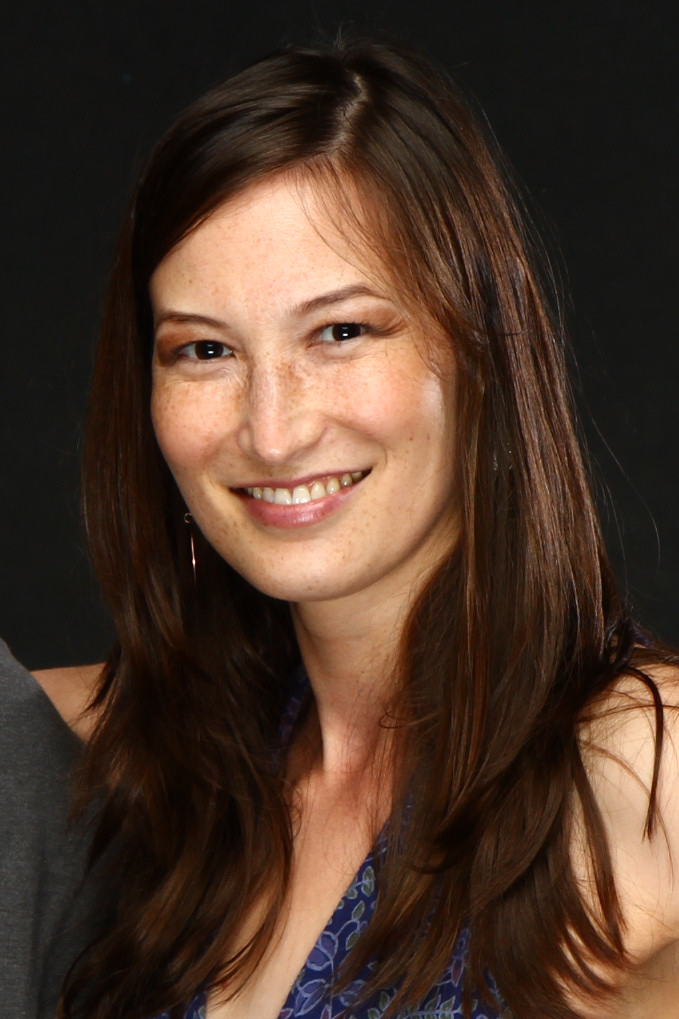
- Spence at the 2013 Florida SuperCon
- Born: January 22, 1977 (age 49); Toronto, Ontario, Canada
- Occupation: Actress
- Years active: 1993–present
- Spouse: Benjamin Immanuel (m. 2011)

Jennifer Spence (born January 22, 1977) is a Canadian actress. Her acting credits include playing Dr. Lisa Park on the Stargate Universe television series, Betty Robertson in the series Continuum, and Grace Day in Travelers.

== Career ==
Spence has had principal roles on a number of television series, including Exes and Ohs, The 4400, Reunion and Write & Wrong. She appeared in recurring roles on Killer Instinct, DaVinci's Inquest, You Me Her, and Travelers.

Immediately following the cancellation of Stargate Universe, Spence joined some other of the show's cast (including Michael Dopud) in a pilot of the new show Echoes, produced by Stargate's Mark Savela and Ken Kabatoff.

In 2012, Spence had roles in episodes of three network television shows, The Killing, Alcatraz and Supernatural. Spence had a recurring role in the science fiction television series Continuum, as Detective Betty Robertson, which aired from May 2012 to October 2015. In 2013, she had a featured role in the film Down River, which was written and directed by her husband Ben Immanuel.

== Personal life ==
Spence was born and raised in Toronto, Ontario, by a British father and third-generation Japanese Canadian mother. She married actor Benjamin Immanuel in 2011, and starred in his 2013 feature film Down River. They reside in Vancouver, British Columbia.

== Filmography ==
=== Film ===
Year	Title	Role	Notes
1997	Blind Spot	Girl in the Park	Short
2003	The Core	Zimsky's Assistant	
2004	The Truth About Miranda	Woman #2	
2006	Catch and Release	Comforting Friend	
2013	Down River	Aki	
2014	Mina.Minerva	Robyn	Short
2015	The Adept	Maddy	Short
2016	Trying	Claire	Short
2017	Wonder	Science Fair Judge	

=== Television ===
Year	Title	Role	Notes
2001	Da Vinci's Inquest	Witness	"It's Backwards Day"
2001	The Heart Department	Nurse #3	TV film
2002	Mr. St. Nick	Gate Attendant	TV film
2003	Da Vinci's Inquest	Tricia	"Thanks for the Toaster Oven"
2003–04	Da Vinci's Inquest	Kimmy	"Twenty Five Dollar Conversation", "Out of the Bag and All Over the Street", "Wash the Blood Out of the Ring"
2004	Tru Calling	Stephanie Brandis	"The Longest Day"
2004	Touching Evil	Nurse's Aide	"Mercy"
2004	Huff	Monique	"Pilot"
2005	Reunion	Evelyn	"1993"
2005–06	Killer Instinct	Det. Burch	"Game Over", "Love Hurts"
2006	Northern Town	Suko	TV series
2007	A Decent Proposal	Gwen Stathis	TV film
2007	Write & Wrong	Cathy	TV film
2007	The 4400	Joanna	Recurring role (season 4)
2009	Eureka	Dr. Monroe	"Shower the People"
2009–2011	Stargate Universe	Lisa Park	Recurring role
2009–2011	Stargate Universe: Kino	Lisa Park	Recurring role
2011	Exes and Ohs	Devin	Main role
2012	Virtual Lies	Dr. Gloria Reese	TV film
2012	Supernatural	Jean Holiday	"Plucky Pennywhistle's Magical Menagerie"
2012	Alcatraz	Susan Lee	"Webb Porter"
2012	The Killing	Eve	"Ghosts of the Past"
2012	Echoes	Sonya	Unsold TV pilot
2012–2014	Continuum	Betty Robertson	Main role (seasons 1–3)
2014	Christmas Icetastrophe	Alex Novak	TV film
2015	Motive	Melissa Dixon	"The Glass House"
2015	The Whispers	Tech Specialist	"Traveller in the Dark"
2015	Ties That Bind	Ms. Lowens	"It Doesn't Show"
2015	Girlfriends' Guide to Divorce	Editor	"Avoid the Douchemobile"
2016	Unreal	Connie	"War"
2016	Van Helsing	Karen	"Help Me"
2016	Frequency	Susie Cairone	"Pilot"
2016	Beyond	Dr. Tolan	"I Scream, You Scream", "Stir"
2016–2018	Travelers	Grace Day	Recurring role
2016–2019	You Me Her	Carmen	Recurring role S1-S4
2018	Life Sentence	Agent J Stern	"Re-Inventing the Abbotts"
2018	The Bletchley Circle: San Francisco	Olivia Mori	Recurring role
2019	Supernatural	Melly Krakowski	"Golden Time"
2019-2022	Traces	Prof. Kathy Torrance	Main role (seasons 1 and 2)
2021	Trigger Me	Nikki	Recurring role
2021–2025	Family Law	Winnie Sugimoto	7 episodes
2023	Lucky Hank	Ashley	4 episodes
2024–present	The Trades	Chelsea Nakamura	Main role
2025	The Thundermans: Undercover	Principal Taylor	3 episodes
2025	Happy Face	Renee	3 episodes
2026	Doc	Jocelyn Sato	"Next"
2026	Off Campus	Tolbert	3 episodes
2026	The Audacity	Sophie Wang	3 episodes
