= Jackie Mason =

American comedian and actor (1931–2021)

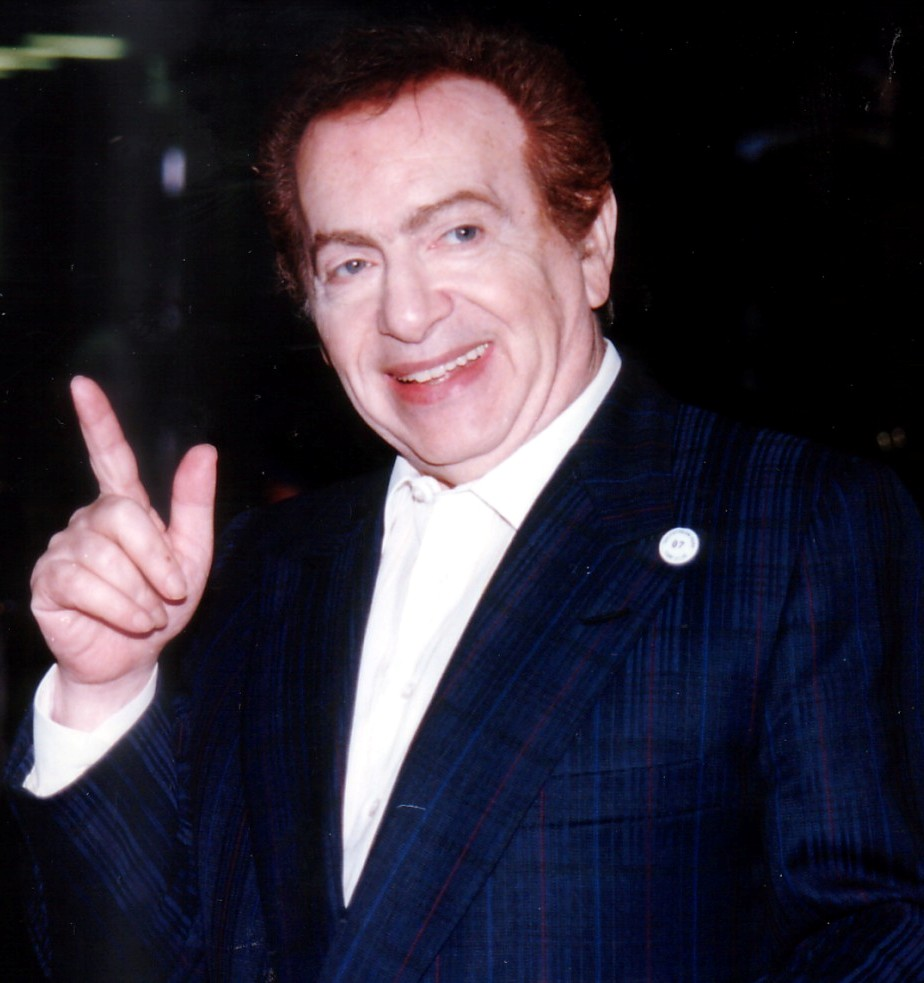
- Mason in 2006
- Born: Yaakov Moshe Maza; June 9, 1931; Sheboygan, Wisconsin, U.S.
- Died: July 24, 2021 (aged 90); New York City, New York, U.S.
- Education: City College of New York (B.A.); Mesivtha Tifereth Jerusalem
- Notable work: The World According to Me! and Jackie Mason on Broadway
- Spouse: Jyll Rosenfeld (m. 1991)
- Children: 1

Comedy career
- Years active: 1955–2021
- Medium: Stand-up, television, film, radio
- Genres: Political satire Observational comedy Improvisational comedy
- Subjects: American politics International relations Current events Race relations Antisemitism; Jewish culture American culture
- Website: Jackie Mason website

Jackie Mason (born Yacov Moshe Maza; Yiddish: יעקב משה מזא"ה; June 9, 1931 – July 24, 2021) was an American stand-up comedian and actor.

His 1986 one-man show The World According to Me! garnered him a Special Tony Award; he also won an Outer Critics Circle Award, an Ace Award, and an Emmy Award for his show, as well as a Grammy nomination. Later, his 1988 special Jackie Mason on Broadway won another Emmy Award (for outstanding writing) and another Ace Award, and his 1991 voice-over of Rabbi Hyman Krustofski in The Simpsons episode "Like Father, Like Clown" won Mason a third Emmy Award. Jackie Mason wrote and performed six one-man shows on Broadway.

Known for his delivery and voice, as well as his use of innuendo and pun, Mason's often culturally grounded humor was described as irreverent and sometimes politically incorrect. A critic for Time magazine wrote that, throughout his career, Mason spoke to audiences: "... with the Yiddish locutions of an immigrant who just completed a course in English. By mail."

== Early life ==
Jackie Mason was born Yacov Moshe Maza on June 9, 1931 (according to the 1940 NYC census), in Sheboygan, Wisconsin, the fourth and last son (and only son born in the United States) of six children of strict Orthodox Jewish parents. Jackie Mason's family included many rabbis, including his father, his grandfather, his great-grandfather, and his great-great grandfather.

His father, Eli Maza, and his mother, Belle (née Gitlin), were born in Minsk (then part of the Russian Empire) and immigrated to the U.S. after World War I, in the 1920s, along with the rest of Mason's family.

A Jewish refugee organization helped his father find a position in Sheboygan, as it needed a rabbi. When Mason was five years old, his family moved to the Lower East Side of Manhattan in New York City, largely so that he and his siblings could pursue a yeshiva education, where he grew up on Henry Street, Rutgers Street, and Norfolk Street. There, his parents and their friends all spoke Yiddish.

As a teenager, Mason worked as a busboy at resorts in the Borscht Belt in New York's Catskill Mountains. He recalled: "Twenty minutes, at the Pearl Lake Hotel. I broke all the dishes. They made me a lifeguard. 'But I can't swim', I told the owner. 'Don't tell the guests', he says."

In 1953 Mason graduated with a Bachelor of Arts degree in his double major of English and sociology from the City College of New York. At age 18 he became a cantor, and at age 25 he received semikhah from Rabbi Moshe Feinstein and was ordained a rabbi (as his three brothers, father, grandfather, and great-grandfather had been). He led congregations in Weldon, North Carolina, and at Beth Israel Congregation in Latrobe, Pennsylvania. He said that in synagogue, "I started telling more and more jokes, and after a while, a lot of gentiles would come to the congregation just to hear the sermons."

Eli Maza, his father, died in 1959.

Three years later, after his father died, he resigned from his job as a rabbi in a synagogue to become a comedian because, he said, "Somebody in the family had to make a living."

Mason was the fourth of six children, with three older and two younger sisters. His three brothers all became rabbis, while both of his sisters married rabbis. Mason later recalled that entering the rabbinate seemed effectively predetermined in his family, saying that "it was unheard-of to think of anything else".

Despite his different career path, Mason remained close to his siblings. In 1987, he said that he gave money to the families of his three brothers and two sisters and described the siblings as "very close".

== Career ==
=== Early years ===
Mason wrote most of his own material. A sampling of his humor includes:

On doctors: "That's a great profession, a doctor. Where else can you ask a woman to get undressed and then send the bill to her husband?"

On trust, Mason said: "My grandfather always said that I shouldn't watch my money. That I should watch my health. So while I was watching my health, someone stole my money. It was my grandfather."

On what is important in life: "Money is not important. Love is important. Fortunately, I love money."

On pleasing people: "You can't please everyone. I have a girlfriend. I think she's the most wonderful person in the world. That's to me. But to my wife ..."

On fidelity: "Eighty percent of married men cheat in America. The rest cheat in Europe."

He was a comedian at the Fieldston Hotel in Swan Lake, New York, in the summer of 1955. Mason was let go because his act was considered too far ahead of its time. The patrons had not been exposed to a comic who seemed to be ridiculing them. A few years later, Don Rickles came along, but at that point audiences had become open to this type of humor throughout the Borscht Belt. He adopted his stage name after appearing on the Barry Gray radio show. He performed at New York City nightclubs (where he was earning as much as $10,000 ($104,000 in current dollar terms) a week), and on The Steve Allen Show, his first national TV appearance, in 1962, and the Tonight Show as well as on The Perry Como Show, The Dean Martin Show, and The Garry Moore Show. The William Morris Agency advised him in 1962 to take elocution lessons so that he could shed his heavy Yiddish accent, but he refused.

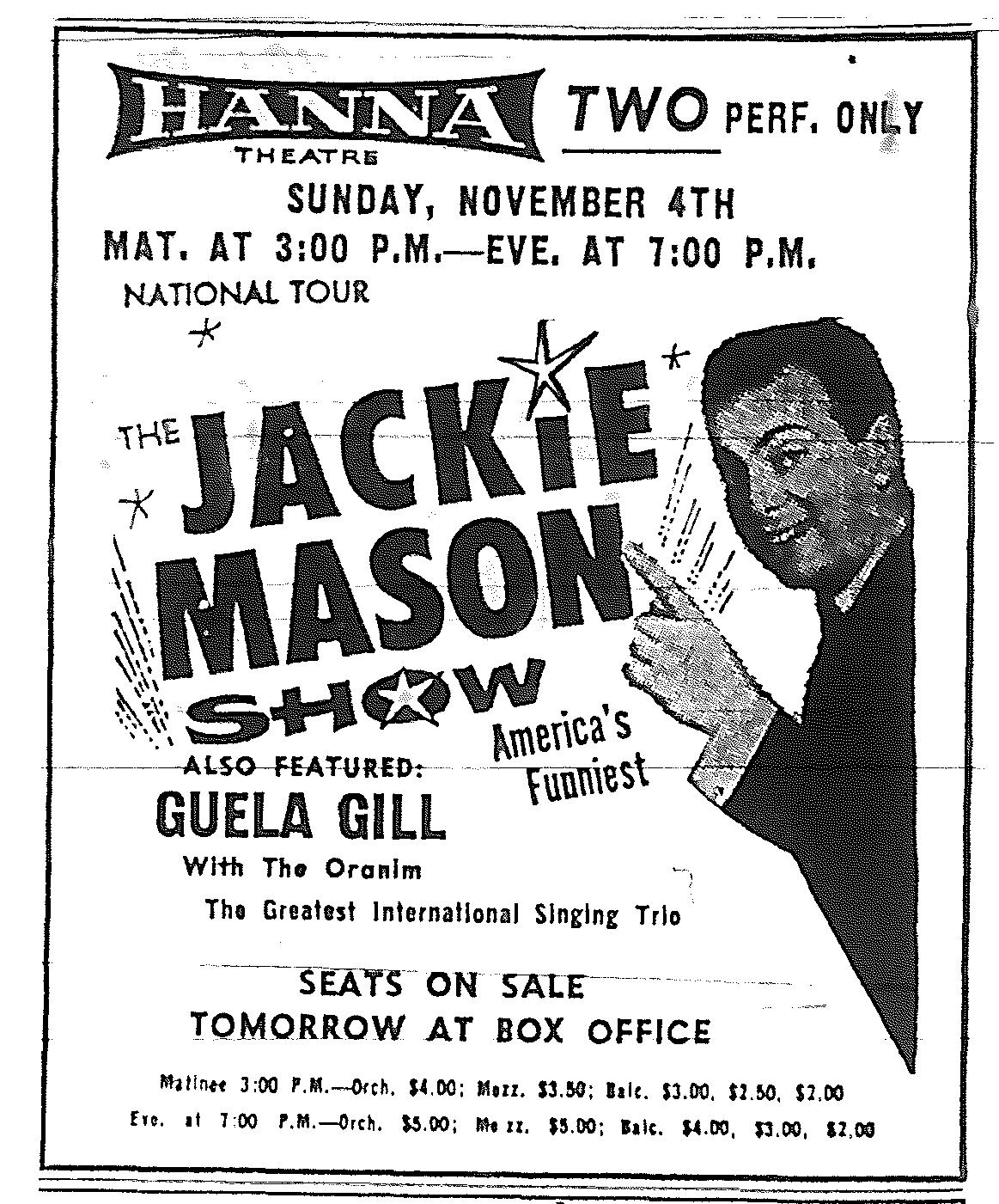
1968 ad for The Jackie Mason Show at the Hanna Theatre in Cleveland, Ohio

Mason made several appearances as a guest on The Ed Sullivan Show during the 1960s. He claimed to have been on the episode which featured the American television debut of the Beatles, but he did not appear on any of the three shows that featured the Beatles. Mason stated during his appearance on the BBC show Desert Island Discs, in March 2012, that at the time he did not think much of the group, referring to them as "four kids in search of a voice who needed haircuts". It is possible that he confused the Beatles with The Animals, who appeared on the same show as Mason on October 18, 1964, to a similar audience of screaming young girls.

In 1962 he came out with his initial LP record, a best-seller entitled I'm the Greatest Comedian in the World, Only Nobody Knows It Yet, followed by I Want to Leave You with the Words of a Great Comedian.

In the Desert Island Discs interview, he also related how Frank Sinatra and a group of others once came to his show in Las Vegas and Sinatra started heckling his act. Mason made uncomplimentary comments to Sinatra until he "and his whole group" left. When asked whether he thought it was naïve to do that, given Sinatra's connections with "the Mob", Mason said, "No, I said to myself...what could they do me?" He went on to describe how shots were later fired into his room which cracked all the windows. The police did not pursue an investigation.

=== "Middle finger" incident (1964) ===
During his October 18, 1964, appearance on The Ed Sullivan Show, Mason allegedly gave host Ed Sullivan the finger on air. Footage of the incident shows Mason in the middle of doing his stand-up comedy act and then looking toward Sullivan, who had placed himself directly behind the camera, commenting that Sullivan was signaling him. Sullivan was reportedly letting Mason know (by holding up two fingers) that he had only two minutes left, and to cut his act short, as the program was about to cut away due to having been partly pre-empted by an impromptu speech by President Lyndon B. Johnson that the show carried.

Mason began working his own fingers into his act to make fun of the situation and pointed toward Sullivan with an index finger, a thumb, but not, as Sullivan mistakenly believed, his middle finger. Sullivan was infuriated by this, and banned Mason from future appearances on the show, canceling Mason's six-appearance contract worth $45,000 (equivalent to $467,000 in 2025). Mason denied knowingly giving Sullivan the middle finger; he later said that he had not heard of the middle finger gesture at that time.

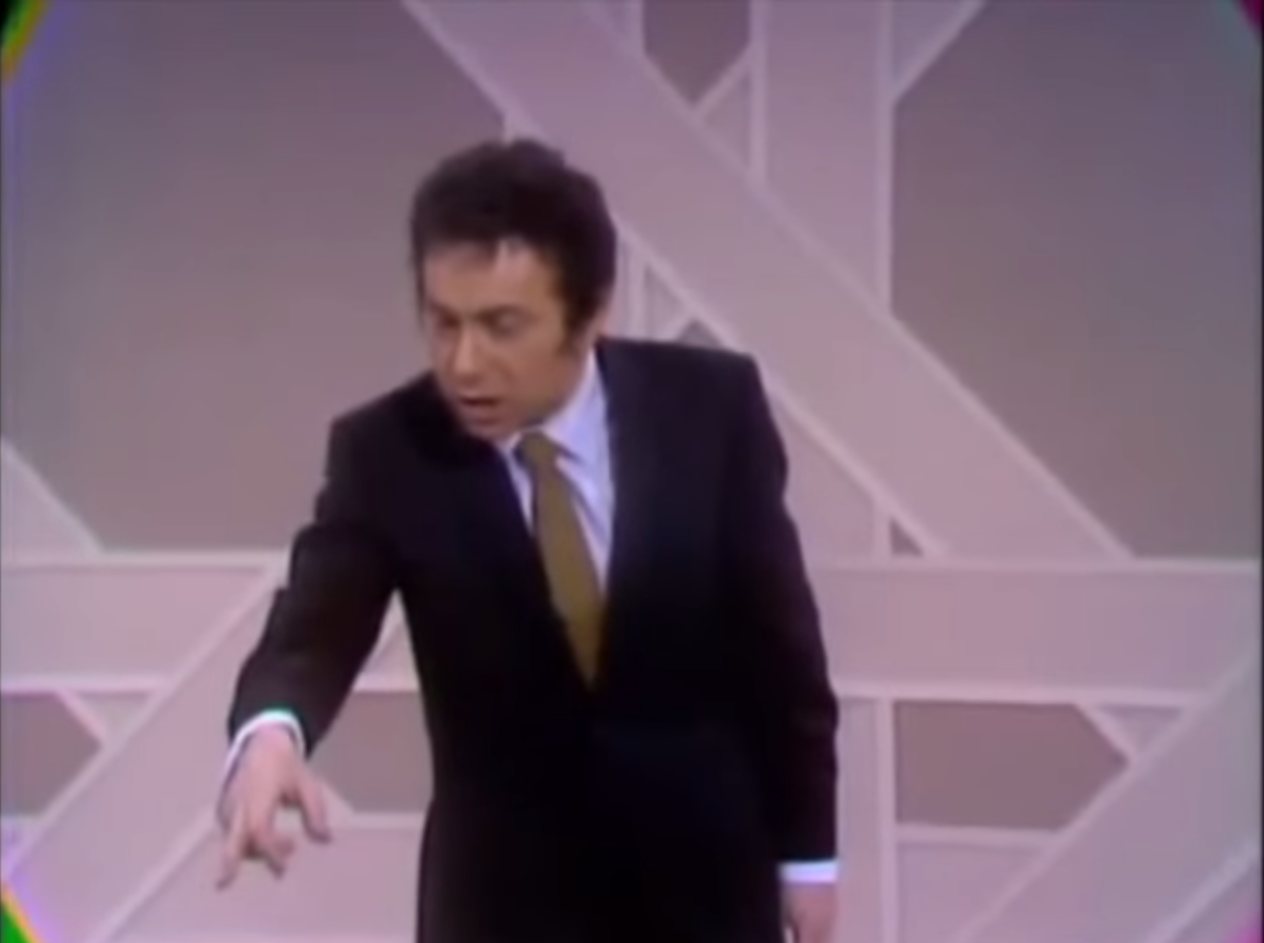
Jackie Mason gestures to a member of the audience on the Smothers Brothers Comedy Hour, January 19, 1969.

To clear his name, Mason filed a libel suit on the grounds that Sullivan had defamed him at the New York Supreme Court. That court dismissed most of Mason's complaint. Both Mason and Sullivan appealed to the New York Supreme Court Appellate Division (which reinstated three additional causes of action against Sullivan) in June 1966.

Mason was nevertheless banned from the show for a period of time. Sullivan asserted that Mason was unpredictable and could not be trusted. Because of Sullivan's influence, he was branded as unreliable, volatile, and obscene, and he failed to get substantial television work for the next two decades.

Mason was given a comeback appearance on Sullivan's television program two years later, and Sullivan publicly apologized to him, but the damage was done. At that time, Mason opened his monologue by saying, "It is a great thrill ... and a fantastic opportunity to see me in person again." Mason later appeared on the show five times: April 23, 1967; February 25, 1968; November 24, 1968; July 22, 1969; and August 31, 1969. Mason later said: "It took twenty years to overcome what happened in one minute".

=== 1969–1985 ===
In 1969, Mason appeared twice on the CBS variety series The Smothers Brothers Comedy Hour. His first appearance, broadcast on January 19, featured Ray Charles; Mason performed stand-up, appeared in comedy sketches with Tom and Dick Smothers, and joined Charles for "Oy Vey Blues". Mason returned for an episode with Joan Baez that was scheduled for March 9, but CBS substituted a rerun after saying that the program had not been delivered in time for advance review. The episode, which included a Mason joke about children "playing doctor" and remarks by Baez concerning the imprisonment of her husband David Harris for refusing military service, was eventually broadcast on March 30 after some material was edited.

That year, Mason made his Broadway debut as Jewish widower Nat Weiss in the comedy play A Teaspoon Every Four Hours, which he wrote with Mike Mortman. The production played 97 previews before closing after its official opening performance, establishing a Broadway record for previews that was later surpassed by Spider-Man: Turn Off the Dark, which played 182 previews before opening.

Mason continued appearing on television during the 1970s, including several appearances on The Merv Griffin Show in 1970.

Mason had his first starring film role in the comedy-drama The Stoolie (1972), playing Roger Pitman, a small-time drug dealer and police informer who flees to Miami with money intended for a police operation. Mason also helped finance the independently produced film. John G. Avildsen began directing the production but left to make Save the Tiger, with George Silano completing the film.

Later in the decade, Mason appeared as Harry Hartounian in Carl Reiner's comedy film The Jerk (1979), starring Steve Martin. He subsequently appeared in Mel Brooks' History of the World, Part I (1981).

=== 1986–2011 ===
In 1986, Mason made a triumphant return to Broadway in the two-year run of The World According to Me! which ran for 367 performances in its first run and 203 performances in its second run at the Brooks Atkinson Theatre, his first of several one-man theatrical shows. It was well received both by critics and the public; Frank Rich, the sometimes harsh reviewer of The New York Times, wrote: "So sue me ... Mason was very, very funny". It won a Special Tony Award, an Outer Critics Circle Award, an Ace Award, an Emmy Award, and a Grammy nomination. His special Jackie Mason on Broadway won an Emmy Award for outstanding writing and an Ace Award.

Mason starred in the movie Caddyshack II (1988), where his character had the same surname, Hartounian, as his character in The Jerk. In 1990 and 1991, Mason again was on Broadway, this time with his successful two-act show Brand New, which ran for 216 performances at the Neil Simon Theatre, and won him his second Outer Critics Circle Award. Critic Clive Barnes of the New York Post praised the "brilliant" comic and his "totally new from top to tuchis" humor. Critic Mel Gussow of The New York Times remarked on the "exact meeting" between performance and material in which Mason engaged in a comic attack on everyone, including himself, cutting them all down to size.

In 1992, Mason won a Primetime Emmy Award for Outstanding Voice-Over Performance for his voice-over of Rabbi Hyman Krustofski in The Simpsons episode "Like Father, Like Clown", making him the first guest star to win an Emmy for his role. Mason also appeared in The Simpsons episodes "Today I Am a Clown", "Once Upon a Time in Springfield", "The Ten-Per-Cent Solution", "At Long Last Leave", and "Clown in the Dumps"; the last episode focuses upon Rabbi Krustofski's death and its effects on his son, Krusty the Clown. The character would appear three more times in fantasy sequences/flashbacks in "The Nightmare After Krustmas", "Flanders' Ladder" and "Woo-Hoo Dunnit?" which was his final appearance in the series and final acting performance before his death in 2021.

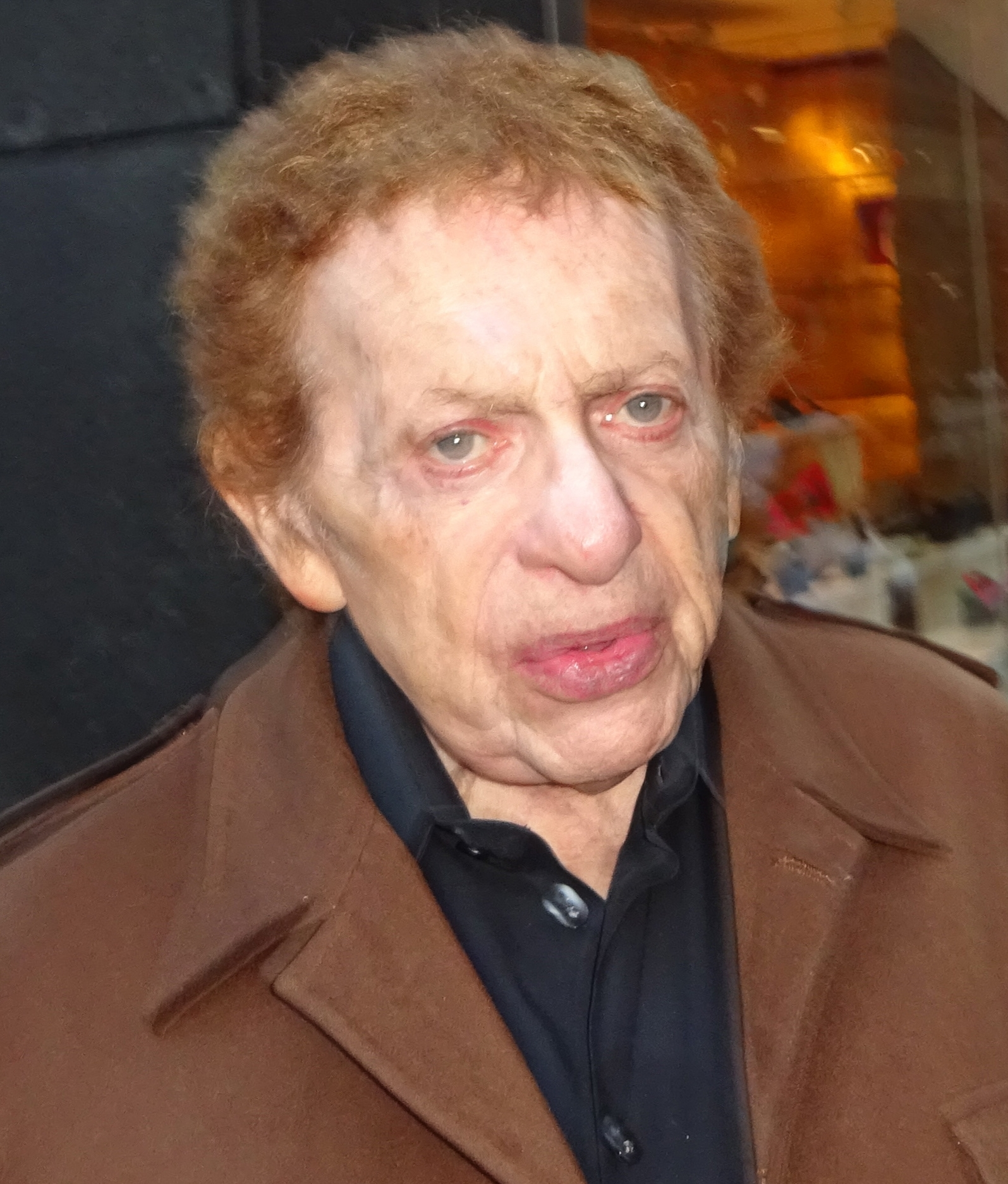
Mason in April 2016

One of his Broadway shows, his two-act Politically Incorrect (1994–95) ran for 347 performances at Broadway's John Golden Theater. Critic John Simon of Time wrote: "His method is hyperbole and reductio ad absurdum, but always informed by bitter reason. His irony is a spotlight illuminating our absurdities; his zingers are scalpels laying bare the sickness under the skin. There is a unifying thrust, a focus, a structure: an attack on both liberal hypocrisy and conservative apathy, and on the climate of political correctness that makes it impossible to attack anyone but WASPs. ... Mason is a true satirist in the mold of ... Mark Twain . ... " It was performed during the same period that Bill Maher's late-night, half-hour political TV talk show Politically Incorrect was on the air. Maher brought a lawsuit against Mason's production, which was dismissed as frivolous. Mason was able to use this show title, and it is one of his most successful road productions. Between these shows, Mason played the lead in a short-lived television interfaith sitcom called Chicken Soup alongside Lynn Redgrave.

Mason put on the Broadway one-man shows Love thy Neighbor (1996–97) which ran for 225 performances at the Booth Theatre (critic Lawrence Van Gelder of The New York Times described Mason's routines as "roaringly funny"), Much Ado About Everything (1999–2000) which was nominated for a Laurence Olivier Award for Best Entertainment for its run in London) and ran for 183 performances at the John Golden Theatre (in this effort Van Gelder described Mason as "convulsing audiences"), Prune Danish (2002; nominated for a Tony Award for Best Special Theatrical Event), Jackie Mason: Freshly Squeezed (2005; for which he was nominated for a Drama Desk Award for Outstanding Solo Performance), and The Ultimate Jew (2008).

In a 2005 poll to find the Comedian's Comedian, Mason was voted #43 among the top-50 comedy acts ever by fellow comedians and comedy insiders. He was also ranked #63 in "Comedy Central Presents: 100 Greatest Stand-Ups of All Time". He holds the record for the longest-running one-man show in Broadway history and the longest-running stand-up show in the history of London's West End.

His full-length courtroom dramedy motion picture One Angry Man was released in 2010 throughout the US and Canada. Mason's most recent film Jackie Goldberg: Private Dick (2011) was a direct-to-DVD production, released by FilmWorks Entertainment.

== Controversies ==
In 1991, Mason was criticized by African-American organizations including the NAACP, when he called New York City mayor David Dinkins "a fancy schvartze with a moustache" Mason later apologized. In 2009, Mason referred to Barack Obama as a schvartze during one of his stand-up routines, which prompted members of the audience to walk out.

In 2003, Mason co-wrote an article that advised Israeli leaders to threaten the expulsion of Palestinians from Israel, the West Bank, and Gaza Strip. Mason and Raoul Felder wrote, "We have paralyzed ourselves by our sickening fear of World Opinion, which is why we find it impossible to face one simple fact: We will never win this war unless we immediately threaten to drive every Arab out of Israel if the killing doesn't stop."

In 2012, Mason said that a friend at the time, Kaoru Suzuki-McMullen, attacked him while leaving his apartment on West 57th Street in Manhattan. Suzuki-McMullen said she was attacked by Mason, but she was arrested. Both sides agreed to drop the matter and all charges were dropped against Suzuki-McMullen.

== Personal life ==
Mason had one child, daughter Sheba Mason, from his decade-long relationship with Ginger Reiter, an English teacher and playwright from South Florida. Sheba was born in 1985 and later became a stand-up comedian.

Reiter brought a paternity and child-support action against Mason. A court-ordered paternity test showed a 99.94 percent probability that Mason was Sheba's father, and Mason subsequently paid child support until she turned 18.

Reiter drew upon her relationship with Mason for a musical, originally titled Oh, Jackie, Oh!. She wrote the first version in 1983, before Sheba was born, and staged it at a synagogue in Florida. The play later became intertwined with the couple's legal dispute. During the paternity proceedings, a Florida court issued an injunction restricting Reiter from publicly discussing the case, although the order specifically exempted Oh Jackie Oh as it was then constituted. In 1990, the Florida Third District Court of Appeal ordered the injunction dissolved and the court file unsealed.

The musical was subsequently revised several times. By 2011, Reiter and Sheba had co-written a new version titled 702 Punchlines and Pregnant, in which Sheba portrayed her mother. A 2012 production, titled 702 Punchlines & Pregnant: The Jackie Mason Musical, credited Ginger Reiter and Sheba Mason with the book and Reiter with the music and lyrics. Sheba continued to appear in later productions of the musical, which developed under the title The Jackie Mason Musical.

In 1991, Mason married his longtime manager Jyll Rosenfeld. The following year, after Rosenfeld suffered a miscarriage, Mason publicly expressed doubts about the marriage, saying that he did not enjoy being married and believed it would not last, although he said that the two remained close and that she would continue as his manager. Despite his prediction, Mason and Rosenfeld remained married until his death in 2021.

In March 2012, Mason's girlfriend, Kaoru Suzuki-McMullen, was charged with assault following an altercation with him in New York. According to police, Mason alleged that she struck him during an argument.

== Political views ==
Mason was originally a Democrat and described himself in 1989 as a "Humphrey Democrat", saying that he had supported the American civil rights movement. He later moved toward the political right and became a registered Republican. By 2008, the Los Angeles Times described his political outlook as having an "unabashed conservative bent". Mason said that he had supported Fred Thompson and Mitt Romney during the 2008 Republican Party presidential primaries, although his political commentary also included criticism of Republicans, including George W. Bush and John McCain.

Mason became involved in New York electoral politics during the 1989 New York City mayoral election, campaigning for Republican candidate Rudy Giuliani against Democrat David Dinkins. Giuliani's campaign used Mason as a prominent surrogate and featured him in a television advertisement. In September 1989, however, the campaign dropped Mason after an interview in which he said that Jews were voting for Dinkins "out of guilt" and described what he called "a sick Jewish problem of voting for a black man no matter how unfit he is for the job." He also said that Dinkins "looks like a black model without a job" and argued that, if Dinkins were white, Jewish voters would not support him over Giuliani. Mason said that some of his remarks had been taken out of context or misquoted and said that he had intended some of them to be off the record, although he repeated several of the statements at a subsequent news conference. The American Jewish Committee denounced the remarks, while Giuliani called them "offensive".

In later years Mason was a supporter of Donald Trump. During the 2016 United States presidential election, he said that he supported Trump over Hillary Clinton, arguing that Clinton's taxation and regulatory policies would damage the economy. He continued to praise Trump after his presidency, describing himself in a 2021 interview as one of Trump's original supporters and saying that he believed Trump had been a successful president.

Mason was also a strong supporter of Israel and frequently expressed hawkish views on the Israeli-Palestinian conflict. During the 1980s he publicly expressed admiration for Meir Kahane, founder of the Jewish Defense League and the Israeli Kach party. In a 1987 interview, Mason endorsed Kahane's argument that the growth of the Arab population posed a demographic threat to Israel and said that democratic principles should not necessarily be applied to Israel in the same manner as in the United States. Mason had appeared on a Kach radio programme and had previously performed at a benefit for the Jewish Defense League's legal defence fund, although he said that he opposed the organization's use of violence.

Mason later supported the idea of encouraging Palestinians or Israeli Arabs who did not accept Israeli sovereignty to emigrate. His association with Kahane and Kahane's followers continued to attract attention during the 1990s. In 2001, Mason joined the advisory board of One Jerusalem, an organization established to oppose the division of Jerusalem as part of an Israeli-Palestinian peace agreement.

In interviews late in his life, Mason remained strongly supportive of Israel and critical of Democratic administrations' approaches to the Israeli-Palestinian conflict. In 2021, he criticized the Democratic Party's stance toward Israel and expressed concern that the Joe Biden administration would place greater emphasis on accommodating Palestinian demands.

== Death ==
Mason died on July 24, 2021, at Mt. Sinai Hospital in Manhattan after being hospitalized for over two weeks.

Many celebrities and other notable figures mourned Mason's death. Gilbert Gottfried called him "one of the best." Fox News personality Sean Hannity remarked that he was "irreverent, iconoclastic, funny, smart and a great American patriot." Actor Henry Winkler tweeted that Mason put on "truly one of the funniest shows I have ever seen ever. Thank you Jackie and now you get to make heaven laugh."

== Works ==
=== Selected TV, film and radio roles ===
- The Ed Sullivan Show (1961–1968) – frequent guest appearances
- It's a Mad, Mad, Mad, Mad World – gas station attendant
- Sleeper (1973) – Voice of robot tailor (uncredited)
- The Stoolie (1974) – Roger Pitman
- The Jerk (1979) – Harry Hartounian
- History of the World, Part I (1981) – Jew #1
- Caddyshack II (1988) – Jack Hartounian
- Chicken Soup (1989) – Jackie Fisher
- The Simpsons – Rabbi Hyman Krustofski in ten episodes:
  - "Like Father, Like Clown" (1991)
  - "Today I Am a Clown" (2003)
  - "Once Upon a Time in Springfield" (2009)
  - "Treehouse of Horror XXII" (2011)
  - "The Ten-Per-Cent Solution" (2011)
  - "At Long Last Leave" (2012)
  - "Clown in the Dumps" (2014)
  - "The Nightmare After Krustmas" (2016)
  - "Flanders' Ladder" (2018)
  - "Woo-Hoo Dunnit?" (2019)
- The Fairly OddParents episode "Beddy Bye/The Grass Is Greener" (2003) – Harvey Sandman a.k.a. The Sandman, a.k.a. The Mattress King
- The Hitchhiker's Guide to the Galaxy – The Quandary Phase (2005) – The East River Creature
- The Jackie Mason Show (2005–11) – Host (originally aired on CN8: The Comcast Network; repeats currently airing on JLTV)
- 30 Rock episode "The Collection" (2007) – himself (small guest appearance)
- The Drinky Crow Show episode "Aspire" (2009) – Mort Cooper
- One Angry Man (2010) – Jackie Mason
- Jackie Goldberg: Private Dick/ Goldberg – P.I. (2011) – Jackie Goldberg
- Answer Me This! Episode 206 (2012) – Jackie Mason
- Graham Norton BBC Radio 2 Show (2012) – Jackie Mason
- When Comedy Went to School (2013) – Jackie Mason

=== Television specials ===
- Jackie Mason On Location (1978)
- Jackie Mason's The World According to Me! (1988)
- An Audience with Jackie Mason (1990)
- Jackie Mason on Campus (1992)
- Jackie Mason at the London Palladium (1996)
- Jackie Mason: A Night at the Opera (2002)

=== One-man shows ===
- Jackie Mason's The World According to Me! (1986–1988)
- Jackie Mason: Brand New (1990–1991)
- Jackie Mason: Politically Incorrect (1994–1995)
- Love Thy Neighbor (1996–1997)
- Much Ado About Everything (1999–2000)
- Jackie Mason: Prune Danish (2002–2003)
- Jackie Mason: Freshly Squeezed (2005–2006)
- Jackie Mason: The Ultimate Jew (2008)
- Jackie Mason: Fearless (2012)

=== Books ===
- Jackie Mason. Jackie Mason's America. Carol Publishing Group, 1983.
- Jackie Mason. Jackie, Oy!: The Frank, Outrageously Funny Autobiography of Jackie Mason. Robson, 1988.
- Jackie Mason, Ira Berkow. How to Talk Jewish. Macmillan, 1991.
- Jackie Mason and Raoul Lionel Felder. Schmucks!: Our Favorite Fakes, Frauds, Lowlifes, Liars, the Armed and the Dangerous, and Good Guys Gone Bad. Harper Collins, 2009. ISBN 978-0-06-112612-3

=== Video blogging ===
Mason appeared in over 200 self-written video blog entries on YouTube, in which he gave his opinions on current events and politics. He also experimented with podcasting, and in February 2012 appeared on the cult British podcast Answer Me This!, to promote his West End stand-up show, Fearless.

== Legacy ==
Mason received a special Tony Award in 1987 for The World According to Me!.

Mason won an Emmy Award for Outstanding Writing in a Variety or Music Program for his 1988 HBO special The World According to Me! (also known as Jackie Mason on Broadway). He also won a 1992 Emmy Award for Outstanding Voice-Over Performance for his role as Rabbi Krustofsky on The Simpsons, shared with five of the show's regular cast members.

In DePatie-Freleng Enterprises' animated cartoon series The Ant and the Aardvark, the Aardvark's voice was performed by John Byner as an imitation of Mason.
