= You Me Her =

Television series

- Genre: Comedy drama; Romance
- Created by: John Scott Shepherd
- Starring: Greg Poehler; Rachel Blanchard; Priscilla Faia; Melanie Papalia
- Theme music composer: Jeff Toyne
- Countries of origin: United States; Canada
- Original language: English
- No. of seasons: 5
- No. of episodes: 50

Production
- Production locations: Vancouver, British Columbia
- Running time: 26–32 minutes
- Production companies: JSS Entertainment; Alta Loma Entertainment; Entertainment One Television

Original release
- Network: Audience Network (seasons 1–4); HBO Canada/Crave (season 5)
- Release: March 22, 2016 – June 7, 2020

You Me Her is an American-Canadian comedy-drama television series that revolves around a suburban married couple who are entering a three-way romantic relationship, one type of polyfidelity relationship. The series is set in Portland, Oregon and was created by John Scott Shepherd. The series is also promoted as TV's "first polyromantic comedy". On June 9, 2016, Audience Network renewed the series for a second and third season. On July 27, 2018, the series was renewed for a fourth and fifth season. The fourth season premiered on April 9, 2019.

On May 10, 2019, Audience Network announced that the fifth season would be the last season and Gail Harvey would be directing all the episodes for the season. However, Audience Network ended operations on May 22, 2020, prior to airing the remaining episodes. The season was released in full on Crave in Canada on June 7, 2020. Seasons 1–5 were aired on Netflix in Europe and Latin America. In 2022, all five seasons were found to be available in the United States on Freevee.

== Premise ==
The series revolves around married, vanilla thirty-somethings Jack and Emma Trakarsky, from Portland, Oregon, whose desires to conceive have been hampered by their lack of sex drive. One day, Jack's efforts to solve the problem lead both Emma and him to Izzy Silva, a 25-year-old graduate student and part-time escort. After initially intending to see her as a client, the two jointly start to fall in love with Izzy, who in turn starts to feel the same way. Consequently, they decide to terminate the arrangement and bring Izzy into the marriage as a lover. This opens up a world of new challenges as they find themselves having to navigate their way through a minefield of prying, nosy neighbours with narrow social norms and prejudices, while at the same time struggling to confront their own feelings and insecurities, and adjust to the unfamiliar dynamic of a non-typical type of polyfidelity relationship.

== Cast ==
=== Main ===
- Greg Poehler as Jack Trakarsky, a student counsellor and Emma's husband
- Rachel Blanchard as Emma Trakarsky, an architect.
- Priscilla Faia as Isabelle "Izzy" Silva, a psychology graduate student and call girl
- Melanie Papalia as Nina Martone (season 2–5; recurring season 1), Izzy's roommate and best friend

=== Recurring ===
- Jennifer Spence as Carmen Amari (seasons 1–4), one of the Trakarsky's neighbors and Emma's best friend
- Ennis Esmer as Dave Amari, one of the Trakarsky's neighbors and Jack's best friend
- Jarod Joseph as Andy Cutler, Izzy's brief love interest who later becomes romantically involved with Nina
- Kevin O'Grady (season 1) and Dave Collette (seasons 2–5) as Gabe, Jack's brother and confidant
- Chelah Horsdal as Lori Matherfield (seasons 1–2), the Trakarsky's nosy neighbor and Ava's mother
- Laine MacNeil as Ava Matherfield (seasons 1–2), Lori's teenage daughter
- Jerry Wasserman as Dean Weinstock (season 1)
- Patrick Gilmore as Shaun, a bartender and Nina's employer, and later her new love interest
- Michael Hogan as Emma's father (season 2)
- Agam Darshi as Ruby Shivani (season 2), Jack's high school girlfriend
- Lara Gilchrist as Hannah (season 3), Carmen's partner in creating a lifestyle magazine
- Carmel Amit as Kylie (season 3), Emma's new girlfriend in Seattle
- Adam Beauchesne as Will (seasons 4–5), a realtor and one of the Trakarsky's neighbors
- Marc-Anthony Massiah as Marty (season 4–5), Will's boyfriend with whom he lives, being neighbors of the Trakarskys
- Gabrielle Rose as Jack and Gabe's mother who visits to make amends with Jack
- Robert Moloney as Ben (seasons 3–5), Izzy's father, later becomes engaged and marries Lala.
- Enid-Raye Adams as Lala (seasons 4–5), hated neighbor of the Trakarskys, then becomes engaged to Ben, Izzy's father, and marries him

== Episodes ==
=== Series overview ===
Season	Episodes	Originally released	
Season	Episodes	First released	Last released
1	10	March 22, 2016	May 24, 2016
2	10	February 14, 2017	April 18, 2017
3	10	March 20, 2018	May 22, 2018
4	10	April 9, 2019	June 11, 2019
5	10	June 7, 2020	

=== Season 1 (2016) ===
No. overall	No. in season	Title	Directed by	Written by	Original release date
1	1	"Cigarettes and Funions and Crap"	Nisha Ganatra	John Scott Shepherd	March 22, 2016
Suburban Portland couple Emma and Jack Trakarsky seek therapy due to the fact that they are trying to conceive and are totally in love, but seriously lacking spice in the bedroom. Jack meets with his brother and rants about the sexual stagnation, and his brother suggests he meet up with an escort. Grad student Izzy goes with her best friend and roommate Nina to their lecture where she sees Andy, a guy in her class who is into her. She receives a text from a client, who turns out to be Jack. By the time Izzy arrives at the hotel they were scheduled to meet at, Jack starts resenting his decision, but Izzy starts talking and drinking with him, which leads to them making out. He goes home and ends up telling Emma, who gets upset initially but instructs him to show her what the escort looks like. At a restaurant with her best friend Carmen the day after, Emma tells her that she is attracted the escort. Izzy walks in, as Emma has contacted her to meet her. After talking for a while, Emma chooses to leave but Izzy changes Emma's mind by giving her a footjob under the table. Emma runs to the bathroom and Izzy follows, and they end up kissing shortly after. Jack tracks down Izzy's apartment building and meets with her, telling her he cannot see her anymore because he loves his wife. Izzy leaves in tears, and Nina comes home later on to find her in a depressive state. Jack goes home to Emma and they have sex, their passion reignited. However Emma shocks Jack by telling him that she met with Izzy and kissed her, and that Izzy isn't the first girl she has been attracted to.
2	2	"Can You Be Cool?"	Nisha Ganatra	John Scott Shepherd	March 29, 2016
As Jack, Emma, and Izzy try to put all of the weird days behind them, Emma reveals a secret, Izzy finds committing to safe-bet Andy tougher than she thought, and Jack can't shake the feeling that he's gotten them all in over their heads.
3	3	"No Penetration"	Nisha Ganatra	John Scott Shepherd	April 5, 2016
Jack, Izzy, and Emma, all together for the first time, agree to keep their relationship a business arrangement. Emma has her first date with Izzy while Jack grows ever more jealous and concerned about how this might affect his possible promotion.
4	4	"Check a Box"	Nisha Ganatra	John Scott Shepherd	April 12, 2016
Jack and Emma start to wonder if they're on the same page. Izzy tries to find stability in Andy. After a startling development, Jack and Emma separately try to end things with Izzy, leading to a surprising epiphany.
5	5	"Niece Jackie"	Nisha Ganatra	John Scott Shepherd	April 19, 2016
Izzy, Emma and Jack cope with the consequences of their alternative relationship; and Andy begins to figure out what Izzy's been up to.
6	6	"The T Word"	Nisha Ganatra	John Scott Shepherd	April 26, 2016
Izzy, Emma, and Jack finally take the polyamorous plunge together but things go wildly awry: Everything that could go wrong meets up to conspire against them... in their front yard. However, the real peril may be right there in the room with them.
7	7	"The Morning After"	Nisha Ganatra	John Scott Shepherd	May 3, 2016
The awkward morning after dredges up old fears for Jack and Emma and wounded feelings for Izzy. With their three-way fling feeling like more trouble than it's worth, Jack and Emma wish they'd shut it down before the whole blackmail thing started...
8	8	"The Relationship More Populated"	Nisha Ganatra	John Scott Shepherd	May 10, 2016
With blackmail and hurt feelings accumulating all around them, Emma and Jack decide the only way to move forward with Izzy is to reinstate the business arrangement parameters. But Izzy has a plan of her own that's way more fun... until it isn't.
9	9	"Sweet Home Colorado"	Nisha Ganatra	John Scott Shepherd	May 17, 2016
After their wild home date turns into a tearful breakup, Izzy decides she needs to move back home to Colorado to deal with her issues. Unaware, Jack and Emma continue to deal with the fallout of what's beginning to feel like a blur of bad choices.
10	10	"Trope Isn't a Four Letter Word"	Nisha Ganatra	John Scott Shepherd	May 24, 2016
Coming together turned their lives upside down, but as much as Jack, Emma, and Izzy try to hide it, splitting up may be doing the real damage.

=== Season 2 (2017) ===
No. overall	No. in season	Title	Directed by	Written by	Original release date
11	1	"Sex Fairy and the Eternal Flames"	Sara St. Onge	John Scott Shepherd	February 14, 2017
The now official throuple commit to cohabitation, face the disapproval of friends and family, and stand their ground in a bold, painful, and permanent way.
12	2	"Like Riding a Vagina Bike"	Sara St. Onge	John Scott Shepherd	February 21, 2017
The throuple come out at a neighborhood party, spinning the gathering out of control and cracking open a fresh can of troubles. Carmen and Dave try to make amends for their prudishness by inviting Jack, Emma, and Izzy on an unusual double date.
13	3	"Remember, Ruby, Remember"	Sara St. Onge	John Scott Shepherd	February 28, 2017
Jack confronts Emma about inviting Izzy to move in without discussing it with him first. Leaving her to wallow in that epiphany, he goes on his interview at Griffin College and finds himself on "the road not taken."
14	4	"Cat in the Box"	Sara St. Onge	John Scott Shepherd	March 7, 2017
It's "Dudes and Chicks Night" in Hawthorne Heights. While the women introduce Molly to their wine hang, bar-hoppers Dave, Gabe and Jack run into Jack's "one who got away."
15	5	"Stoner Sensai's Secrets of Love"	Sara St. Onge	John Scott Shepherd	March 14, 2017
Jack's still caved out at big bro's house, Izzy's trying to coax the married couple back together, and after things go bad at work, Emma's not at all sure about what she really wants.
16	6	"What the F Is Wrong With You Trakarskys?"	Sara St. Onge	John Scott Shepherd	March 21, 2017
Jack inches closer to the point of no return with Ruby. All the while, the clock's ticking on the daunting arrival of Emma's hyper-conservative parents.
17	7	"Weird Janis and the White Trash Baby Vessel"	Sara St. Onge	John Scott Shepherd	March 28, 2017
With the happy throuple reunited; how they must explain Izzy's presence to Emma's old school parents. Nina gets disturbing news about Andy's romantic past. And the Amaris quest for cool leads them into a bizarre social situation.
18	8	"Freaky Little Love Poodles"	Sara St. Onge	John Scott Shepherd	April 4, 2017
Jack and Emma convince her parents that Izzy's their surrogate, but then the throuple's ruse unearths very real questions about babies and the long-term future of their relationship. Nina seeks out Andy's exes to set the record straight.
19	9	"Silver Linings and Vodka"	Sara St. Onge	John Scott Shepherd	April 11, 2017
Izzy and Emma are stunned by Jack's proposal: The three of them having a baby together, But before they have time to delve deeper, they'll have to talk their way out of a tight spot with Emma's parents.
20	10	"Baby, Baby Where Did Our Love Go?"	Sara St. Onge	John Scott Shepherd	April 18, 2017
With the dazzling offer from Pinnacle pressing ever harder and an IVF consultation set, Emma must choose between a larger professional canvas and two true loves.

=== Season 3 (2018) ===
No. overall	No. in season	Title	Directed by	Written by	Original release date
21	1	"Dickless in Seattle"	Sara St. Onge	John Scott Shepherd	March 20, 2018
Four months after Emma moved to Seattle for a new job and new friends, she's climbing her way to the top of the Pinnacle ladder alongside an old flame rekindled. Jack and Izzy settle into blissful monogamy in their newly finished loft but Jack keeps stalling on signing the papers, so Izzy tries to force his hand. They've moved into a new place together, decorated by Izzy. The upcoming divorce mediation and an uncomfortable reunion hangs over all of them. Carmen and new neighbor Hannah start a lifestyle magazine.
22	2	"I Said Make Up"	Sara St. Onge	John Scott Shepherd	March 27, 2018
The day before the divorce signing, Jack and Emma are forced to spend an afternoon together divvying up their stuff. Someone very important from Izzy's past shows up at precisely the wrong time. Dave and Carmen struggle to find a balance between their jobs and childcare. With Shaun's help, Nina spins her vitriol towards Andy into an inventive thesis.
23	3	"Tourist Lesbians and Millennial Twats"	Sara St. Onge	John Scott Shepherd	April 3, 2018
When Izzy finds Emma and Jack kissing, they have a three-way. Izzy tells Emma that she's dead to her if she leaves them again but Emma still returns to Seattle and signs the divorce papers with Jack. Six weeks later Emma finds out that she's pregnant.
24	4	"Inconceivable!"	Sara St. Onge	Natalie Renée Shepherd	April 10, 2018
Jack plans to propose to Izzy. Emma visits Jack to tell him about her pregnancy.
25	5	"Welcome to the Tiger Cage"	Sara St. Onge	John Scott Shepherd	April 17, 2018
After Emma told him the truth, Jack asks her to keep the baby. Emma realizes that she's still in love with Jack and Izzy.
26	6	"Fool Me Once? Shame on You. Fool Me Twice? Blow Me"	Sara St. Onge	John Scott Shepherd & Martina Monro	April 24, 2018
Izzy rejects Emma and tells Jack that she couldn't trust her again. Jack meets Izzy's father for the first time. After Izzy realised that she wants to marry Jack, Emma tells her that she's pregnant.
27	7	"Hold Onto Your Ovaries"	Sara St. Onge	John Scott Shepherd	May 1, 2018
When Emma explains that the throuple made the baby together, they have another three-way and get back together. Izzy, Emma and Jack start to discuss how they want to raise the child as mothers and father.
28	8	"The Insidious Lure of Pumpkin Spice"	Sara St. Onge	Natalie Renée Shepherd	May 8, 2018
29	9	"Asshole, Other Asshole, and the Depressive Muppet"	Sara St. Onge	John Scott Shepherd	May 15, 2018
30	10	"You Be You And I'll Be Me"	Sara St. Onge	John Scott Shepherd	May 22, 2018

=== Season 4 (2019) ===
No. overall	No. in season	Title	Directed by	Written by	Original release date
31	1	"Triangular Peg, Meet Round Hole"	Jem Garrard	John Scott Shepherd	April 9, 2019
32	2	"The Saddest Clown Show Ever"	Jem Garrard	Michael Reisz	April 16, 2019
33	3	"The Deaf Leading the Blind Leading the Stupid"	Jem Garrard	John Scott Shepherd & Jackie Vleck	April 23, 2019
34	4	"That's So Stupid and I'm Definitely Not Crying"	Jem Garrard	John Scott Shepherd	April 30, 2019
35	5	"Santa Claus Rides Loch Ness Monster into Atlantis!"	Jem Garrard	John Scott Shepherd & Alex Koplow	May 7, 2019
36	6	"Eat Your Strangers and Don't Talk to Vegetables!"	Jem Garrard	Jackie Vleck	May 14, 2019
37	7	"Now Who's Got Egg in Her Hair?"	Jem Garrard	Michael Reisz	May 21, 2019
38	8	"A Whole Bouillabaisse of Crazy"	Jem Garrard	Michael Reisz & Jackie Vleck	May 28, 2019
39	9	"I'm Popeye and You're My Beautiful Spinach"	Jem Garrard	Martina Monro	June 4, 2019
40	10	"Who We Are... And Who We Aren't"	Jem Garrard	John Scott Shepherd	June 11, 2019

=== Season 5 (2020) ===
No. overall	No. in season	Title	Directed by	Written by	Original air date
41	1	"The Stages of (Breakup) Grief"	Gail Harvey	John Scott Shepherd	June 7, 2020
42	2	"Dr. Feelgood's Magic Tea"	Gail Harvey	John Scott Shepherd & Jackie Vleck Moody	June 7, 2020
43	3	"Squonk Happens"	Gail Harvey	Elaine Aronson	June 7, 2020
44	4	"Also, I Hate You."	Gail Harvey	Martina Monro	June 7, 2020
45	5	"Remember the Carlyle!"	Gail Harvey	John Scott Shepherd	June 7, 2020
46	6	"Break It like You Mean It"	Gail Harvey	John Scott Shepherd & Elaine Aronson	June 7, 2020
47	7	"Going Deep Dish"	Gail Harvey	Jackie Vleck Moody	June 7, 2020
48	8	"Oh, Mama!"	Gail Harvey	John Scott Shepherd & Alex Koplow	June 7, 2020
49	9	"Say Something. Say Anything."	Gail Harvey	Elaine Aronson & Jackie Vleck Moody	June 7, 2020
50	10	"Home Is Where the Flaming Heart Is"	Gail Harvey	John Scott Shepherd	June 7, 2020

== Broadcast ==
All seasons are available on Netflix exclusively outside of the United States and Canada.

== Home media ==
The first season of You Me Her was released on DVD as of December 2017.

All episodes of the series are currently available on Tubi and Amazon Freevee.

== Production ==
Filmed in and around Vancouver, British Columbia.

== Awards and nominations ==
Year	Award	Category	Nominee(s)	Result	Ref.
2020	Leo Awards	Best Lead Performance by a Female in a Dramatic Series	Priscilla Faia	Nominated	
2020	Leo Awards	Best Guest Performance by a Male in a Dramatic Series	Lee Majdoub	Nominated	
2020	Leo Awards	Best Picture Editing Dramatic Series	Nicole Ratcliffe	Nominated	
2019	Leo Awards	Best Performance in a Music, Comedy or Variety Program or Series	Priscilla Faia (Episode: You Be You And I'll Be Me)	Won	
2018	Directors Guild of Canada	Outstanding Directorial Achievement	Sara St. Onge (Episode: Tourist Lesbians and Millennial Twats)	Nominated	
2018	Leo Awards	Best Lead Performance by a Female in a Dramatic Series	Priscilla Faia (Episode: Stoner Sensai's Secrets of Love)	Nominated	
2018	Leo Awards	Best Casting in a Dramatic Series	Candice Elzinga (Episode: Stoner Sensai's Secrets of Love)	Nominated	
2018	Leo Awards	Best Guest Performance by a Male in a Dramatic Series	Patrick Lubczyk (Episode: Stoner Sensai's Secrets of Love)	Nominated	
2018	Leo Awards	Best Musical Score in a Dramatic Series	Brent Belke (composer)	Nominated	
2017	Leo Awards	Best Supporting Performance by a Female in a Dramatic Series	Jennifer Spence (Episode: "Like Riding a Vagina Bike")	Nominated	
2017	Leo Awards	Best Lead Performance by a Female in a Dramatic Series	Priscilla Faia (Episode: Sex Fairy and the Eternal Flames)	Nominated	
2017	Leo Awards	Best Musical Score in a Dramatic Series	Brent Belke (Episode: Sex Fairy and the Eternal Flames)	Nominated	
2017	Leo Awards	Best Guest Performance by a Male in a Dramatic Series	Dave Collette (Episode: Like Riding A Vagina Bike)	Nominated	
2017	Canadian Screen Awards	Best Performance by an Actress in a Featured Supporting Role or Guest Role in a Comedic Series	Laine MacNeil	Nominated	
2017	UBCP/ACTRA Awards	Best Actress	Jennifer Spence (Episode: "Like Riding A Vagina Bike")	Nominated	
2016	UBCP/ACTRA Awards	Best Actress	Priscilla Faia	Nominated	
2016	SXSW Film Festival	SXSW Gamechanger Award	Nisha Ganatra	Nominated	
