= Woo-Hoo Dunnit? =

- The Simpsons episode
- Episode no.: Season 30; Episode 22
- Directed by: Steven Dean Moore
- Written by: Brian Kelley
- Production code: YABF15
- Original air date: May 5, 2019

Guest appearances
- Ken Burns as himself; Will Forte as King Toot; Jackie Mason as Rabbi Krustofsky; Liev Schreiber as "Dateline Springfield" Narrator

Episode chronology
← Previous "D'oh Canada"	Next → "Crystal Blue-Haired Persuasion"
- The Simpsons season 30

"Woo-Hoo Dunnit?" is the twenty-second and penultimate episode of the thirtieth season of the American animated television series The Simpsons, and the 661st episode overall. The episode was directed by Steven Dean Moore and written by Brian Kelley. It aired in the United States on Fox on May 5, 2019.

In this episode, the Simpson family is investigated to determine who stole Lisa's college fund. Will Forte, Jackie Mason, and Liev Schreiber guest starred. Filmmaker Ken Burns appeared as himself. The episode received positive reviews.

This was the final episode featuring Russi Taylor to be released in her lifetime, two months before her death in July 2019. It was the final episode to feature Jackie Mason as Rabbi Krustofsky before his death in July 2021.

== Plot ==
A documentary crime series, Dateline: Springfield, interviews the Simpson family after Marge and Lisa, returning home, find that Lisa's college fund of $670.42, hidden in a can of kitchen cleanser under the sink, is missing. The police are called and Chief Wiggum and Lou investigate, but when the narrator casts suspicion on the Simpson family, Marge gets angry at the accusations.

A call to the police made by Helen Lovejoy brings Marge to the top of the list of suspects, accusing her of using the money for her gambling problem, though surveillance footage shows that even though she went to the casino, she resisted the temptation and walked out. The next suspect is Homer, due to his tab at Moe's Tavern being cut off. The police speculate that when Homer got drunk, he stumbled home, fell on and ate some spaghetti leftovers, and then upon stumbling on the cleanser cup with the money, used the cleanser to clean the kitchen and used the money to pay the tab. The police find out that Homer has an alibi: he had accidentally made a six-hour call that night to Disco Stu while licking spaghetti off the entire kitchen.

The next suspect is Bart, who is accused by Milhouse of buying green slime with the money. Bart knew of the money under the sink but always paid back what he borrowed. He masterminded slime production (à la Breaking Bad), at Springfield Elementary, but when the market price fell, he sold his remaining inventory to Comic Book Guy and put the money back in the can, filming this in case the police would not believe him.

The final suspect is Lisa, who is accused by Martin because she wanted a new saxophone. King Toot's Music Store shows a tape of Lisa trying out a new baritone sax for over 14 hours, but she did not buy it, Krusty the Clown buying it before she got the chance. Lisa's alibi is that Marge took her to a hopscotch tutor, much to Lisa's embarrassment. With all suspects gone, Homer and Marge kick Dateline out with the intention of making them apologise for what they did.

Marge and Homer are seen watching the documentary, and Marge places a snap-on coaster she invented under Homer's drink. When she casually mentions that she wants to start a business with the coasters, which cost $0.65 apiece to make, Homer realizes that Marge was the culprit, stealing the money to invest in the business and having denied it the entire time. Homer calls the kids downstairs to tell them the truth, but when Marge compares Homer's visits to Moe's to life adventures and admits she wants something similar for her business, he has a change of heart, covers for Marge and lies to the kids by saying that the rats ate the money thanks to Grampa leaving the cabinet open, and then goes to the beach and enjoys a stroll with Marge.

Meanwhile, at the studio, the narrator loses his voice after arguing about the ending of the documentary, and gets a vocal cord transplant from a sheep.

== Production ==
Liev Schreiber guest starred as the documentary narrator. Will Forte reprised his role as King Toot. Forte first appeared in this role in the twenty-sixth season episode "Covercraft."

== Reception ==
Dennis Perkins of The A.V. Club gave the episode an A−, stating, "’Woo-Hoo Dunnit?’ falls somewhere between ‘solid’ and ‘sublime,’ but the fact that it’s even in the conversation is a damned delight. Like ‘22 For 30,’ the episode breaks up the usual storytelling style when a documentary lens is turned on the family. Smartly conceived, tightly plotted, exceptionally acted by all, and, most importantly, true to the characters even as they’re thrown outside their comfort zone, it’s one of those late-run Simpsons episode that nurtures something like hope. It’s terrific."

Tony Sokol of Den of Geek gave the episode 4.5 out of 5 stars. He called the episode a classic. He highlighted the performances of Julie Kavner and Nancy Cartwright and thought the documentary motif allowed the featuring of the characters in more humorous ways.

"Woo-Hoo Dunnit?" scored a 0.7 rating with a 4 share and was watched by 1.79 million people.
