= Welcome to Sweden (2014 TV series) =

American-Swedish sitcom television series

- Genre: Sitcom
- Created by: Greg Poehler
- Starring: Greg Poehler; Josephine Bornebusch; Lena Olin; Claes Månsson
- Opening theme: "Living in America" by The Sounds
- Composers: Andreas Grill; Nick Malmeström; Adam Nordén
- Countries of origin: Sweden; United States
- Original languages: English; Swedish
- No. of seasons: 2
- No. of episodes: 20

Production
- Executive producers: Fredrik Arefalk; Josephine Bornebusch; Lisa Dahlberg; Pontus Edgren; Jessica Ericstam; Felix Herngren; Iréne Lindblad; Amy Poehler; Greg Poehler; Eleonor Sager; Carrie Stein
- Producers: Johanna Bergenstråhle; Benjamin Thuresson
- Running time: 22 minutes
- Production companies: Entertainment One; Syskon; TV4; Jarowskij; FLX

Original release
- Network: TV4 (Sweden); NBC (United States)
- Release: 21 March 2014 – 3 June 2015

Welcome to Sweden is an American-Swedish sitcom television series created by comedian Greg Poehler, about an American accountant who quits his job to move with his girlfriend to her native country of Sweden. It premiered on TV4 on March 21, 2014. The series is based on Poehler's own experiences as a former intellectual property lawyer from the United States who moved with his girlfriend to her native country of Sweden in 2006. An international production featuring both Swedish and American talent, themes, and dialogue, it is the first English-language production by TV4. The series also aired in the United States on NBC.

On July 28, 2015, four episodes into season two, NBC cancelled the series due to what Poehler described as "craptastically" low ratings, with NBC further stating that production was "officially done". The remaining six episodes of season two were made available via online streaming at NBC's website.

== Cast ==
Family

- Greg Poehler as Bruce Evans, a generally easy-going and open-minded person, liberal by American standards in rebellion against his conservative upbringing, who experiences culture shock with his new life in Sweden
- Josephine Bornebusch as Emma Wiik, a kind and caring, sharp-tongued, no-nonsense, independent-minded woman who helps Bruce as he adjusts to his new life, and tries to convince her family and friends that Bruce is the right man for her to settle down with
- Lena Olin as Viveka Börjesson, Emma's warm but strong-willed and opinionated mother, who does not think that Bruce is the best man for her daughter
- Claes Månsson as Birger Wiik, Emma's mild-mannered father, a retired sea captain
- Christopher Wagelin as Gustav Wiik, Emma's blustery younger brother, a thirty-year old freeloader who frequently resorts to ill-advised shortcuts and schemes to avoid hard work
- Per Svensson as Bengt Wiik, Birger's younger brother, who works at a video rental store, and is an obsessive fan of popular American movies
- Illeana Douglas as housewife Nancy Evans, Bruce's mother, and Wayne Evans's wife
- Patrick Duffy as Wayne Evans, Bruce's father, a small-town Midwestern American man, who sees Bruce's new life in Sweden as strange compared to Wayne's conservative Christian worldview

Other characters

- Amy Poehler as Amy Poehler, a spoiled, self-involved, profligate American celebrity
- Aubrey Plaza as Aubrey Plaza, a meddling, mischievous former client of Bruce's who is strangely minded to insinuate herself into Bruce's personal life
- Magnus Mark as Olof, Emma's boss
- Claes Ljungmark as Hans, CEO of the bank where Emma works
- Basim Sabah Albasim as Hassan, an Iraqi immigrant displaced by the Iraq War
- Jennie Silfverhjelm as Sofia, Emma's friend and colleague
- Henrik Johansson as Karl, Sofia's boyfriend
- Rachel Mohlin as Cecilia
- Kodjo Akolor as Chuck Reed, a fun guy in Stockholm who works as a personal trainer
- Madeleine Martin as a clerk at the café that Bruce frequents
- Marques Ray as "Pepe", an assistant who works at Amy Poehler's office

== Episodes ==
=== Season 1 (2014) ===
Season one is set in the summer, when Bruce first moves to Sweden. A successful money manager for wealthy celebrities, Bruce had happily lived in New York with his girlfriend Emma from Sweden, who he has been with for a year. Emma has moved back to Stockholm for a prestigious banking job, and Bruce is leaving New York to join her. This season follows the couple as Bruce, with no job and no friends, tries to deal with living in a new country with a different language and culture.

Season one of Welcome to Sweden is a co-production of Syskon, Entertainment One (eOne) Television, TV4, and FLX. It was written by Greg Poehler, Josephine Bornebusch, and Niclas Carlsson, and directed by Carl Åstrand (Lunatic Speed). It was executive produced by Amy Poehler (Syskon), Greg Poehler (Syskon), Frederik Arefalk (TV4), Carrie Stein (eOne), Pontus Edgren (FLX), and Felix Herngren (FLX). It was produced by Benjamin Thuresson (Lyckenisse Media), with US footage produced by Michelle Armour (Marobru). Eleonor Sager (FLX) and Josephine Bornebusch were associate producers.

TV4 signed on as a producer on May 8, 2013, and the first season began filming on May 13. It was picked up for distribution in the United States by NBC on October 8.

The first season of Welcome to Sweden broadcast in Sweden on TV4 between March 28 and May 14, 2014, airing Fridays before moving earlier in the week to Wednesdays beginning May 7. After achieving high ratings for its initial episodes, with 1.7 million viewers for the series premiere, Welcome to Sweden was granted a swift renewal by TV4, with the announcement for a ten-episode second season made at MIPTV 2014 in April 2014.

On July 10, 2014, the series began airing in the United States on NBC on Thursdays at 9:00 pm. and on The Comedy Network in Canada. For the US broadcasts, some of the scenes had to be edited, including dubbing over obscene dialogue and pixelating nudity. On August 4, after four episodes, NBC renewed the series for the second season. Although US ratings for the show were not considered particularly high in either total viewers or viewers in the 18-49 key demographic, NBC noted that the 18-49 viewership skewed to a more valuable upscale audience.

No. overall	No. in season	Title ^{A}	Directed by	Written by	Swedish release date	U.S. release date	Swedish viewers (millions)	U.S. viewers (millions)
1	1	"Välkommen" "Day One"	Carl Åstrand	Greg Poehler, Josephine Bornebusch, Niclas Carlsson	March 21, 2014	July 10, 2014	1.681	3.51
Bruce Evans quits his job as a celebrity accountant in New York to move to Sweden with the love of his life, Emma. Already on his first day he has to face new challenges in his adopted country, and above all, he has to meet his girlfriend's strange family. Bruce arrives at the airport where Emma picks him up; as she has rented out her apartment during her time in the USA, they now have to stay with her family until they can find a new place to live. Guest star: Amy Poehler
2	2	"Språket" "Learn the Language"	Carl Åstrand	Greg Poehler, Josephine Bornebusch, Niclas Carlsson	March 28, 2014	July 17, 2014	1.485	2.80
Bruce and Emma are trying to adapt to their new lives in Sweden, and are especially frustrated over not having any place for private time with each other. Bruce tries to learn to speak Swedish. He also meets with one of his previous clients, and finds an unexpected friend. Guest star: Will Ferrell
3	3	"Lägenhet" "Proving Love"	Carl Åstrand	Josephine Bornebusch, Niclas Carlsson, Greg Poehler	April 4, 2014	July 24, 2014	1.515	2.90
Bruce and Emma finally move into Emma's flat in Stockholm and Bruce must get used to the Swedish cultural differences. The couple does not get the reaction they expected from the Swedish Immigration officials when applying for Bruce's residency. Meanwhile, Bruce's belongings arrive from the States, causing more tension in their relationship. Guest stars: Aubrey Plaza, Amy Poehler
4	4	"Farthinder" "Get a Job"	Carl Åstrand	Niclas Carlsson, Greg Poehler, Josephine Bornebusch	April 11, 2014	July 31, 2014	1.200	2.52
Bruce starts to look for work and a previous client of his, Gene Simmons, finds out that Bruce has moved to Stockholm. Guest star: Gene Simmons
5	5	"Vänner" "Fitting In"	Carl Åstrand	Josephine Bornebusch, Niclas Carlsson, Greg Poehler	April 18, 2014	August 7, 2014	0.939	2.19
While trying to make new Swedish friends, Bruce instead encounters problems with his older Iraqi friend. Bruce tries to hang out with Viveka in an attempt to get her to accept his and Emma's relationships. Guest stars: Illeana Douglas, Patrick Duffy
6	6	"Föräldrar" "Parents!"	Carl Åstrand	Greg Poehler, Josephine Bornebusch, Niclas Carlsson	April 25, 2014	August 21, 2014	1.372	2.32
Bruce gets a visit from his parents (Patrick Duffy, Illeana Douglas) who are shocked by life in Sweden. Emma tells Bruce that she believes she is pregnant. Guest stars: Illeana Douglas, Patrick Duffy
7	7	"Lagom" "Homesick"	Carl Åstrand	Greg Poehler, Josephine Bornebusch, Niclas Carlsson	May 2, 2014	August 21, 2014	1.347	1.99
Amy Poehler offers Bruce a huge raise if he'll go back to New York and resume his old job and when he doesn't accept the offer, she enlists the help of Aubrey Plaza. Plaza then flies to Sweden and begins to stalk Bruce in an attempt to get him to go back. Bruce attempts to hire Swedish celebrities as his clients. Guest stars: Amy Poehler, Aubrey Plaza, Björn Ulvaeus, Björn Ranelid
8	8	"Förhållanden" "Breakups"	Carl Åstrand	Josephine Bornebusch, Niclas Carlsson, Greg Poehler	May 7, 2014	August 27, 2014 (online)	0.711	TBA
A family affair stops Bruce and Emma's plans to move back to the United States. Bengt takes advice from Bruce on how to flirt with a woman. Emma allows her friend Marcus (Gustav Roth) to crash on their couch, only for Bruce to later discover he's an ex-boyfriend of hers. Guest star: Malin Åkerman
9	9	"Saknad" "Separate Lives"	Carl Åstrand	Peter Arrhenius, Niclas Carlsson, Greg Poehler, Josephine Bornebusch	May 14, 2014	August 28, 2014	0.693	1.80
Bruce has returned to New York to help Amy Poehler with her financial problems. Emma tries to get her old boyfriend Marcus (Gustav Roth) to move out of her apartment. Wanting to feel young again, Viveka goes out partying with her daughter. Guest star: Aubrey Plaza, Amy Poehler
10	10	"Återförening" "Home"	Carl Åstrand	Niclas Carlsson, Greg Poehler, Josephine Bornebusch	May 14, 2014	August 28, 2014	0.764	1.53
Bruce discovers the truth from Aubrey Plaza. Emma and Gustav want to reunite their parents. Bruce goes back to Sweden but encounters problems after landing. Guest stars: Aubrey Plaza, Amy Poehler

=== Season 2 (2015) ===
The second season begins in the winter, six months after Bruce first moved to Sweden, as he prepares to propose to Emma. The season follows their engagement as they deal with relatives, customs, and career transitions along the way. Filming for season two started in January 2015. The season aired Wednesdays in Sweden on TV4 from April 1 to June 3, 2015. It aired in the United States on NBC on Sundays at 8:00pm beginning July 19, 2015.

Season two is a co-production of Syskon, Entertainment One (eOne) Television, TV4, and Jarowskij. It was executive produced by Amy Poehler (Syskon), Greg Poehler (Syskon), Josephine Bornebusch, Iréne Lindblad (Jarowskij), Frederik Arefalk (TV4), Carrie Stein (eOne), Jessica Ericstam (TV4) and Lisa Dahlberg (TV4). Led by Ulf Kvensler, the writing staff also includes Greg Poehler, Peter Arrhenius, and new additions David Sundin and Bente Danielsson. Josephine Bornebusch bowed out of writing duties for season two due to her pregnancy. The season was produced by Johanna Bergenstråhle (Jarowskij). Episode directors for the season include Ulf Kvensler, Steffan Lindberg, and Lisa James Larsson.

Following its cancellation in the United States, the remaining episodes of the second season were streamed online through NBC's website and video on demand on August 5, 2015.

No. overall	No. in season	Title ^{A}	Directed by	Written by	Swedish release date	U.S. release date	Swedish viewers (millions)	U.S. viewers (millions)
11	1	"Frieriet" "Flash Mob"	Ulf Kvensler	Greg Poehler	April 1, 2015	July 19, 2015	0.722	1.37
Bruce asks Birger for permission to marry Emma. The bank's new head of marketing Diane (Neve Campbell) works to change the company's image through social media. Birger and Viveka think it's time for Gustav to move out. Bruce tries to come up with a creative way to propose to Emma and winds up using Gustav's idea, which backfires. Guest star: Amy Poehler, Neve Campbell and Jack Black
12	2	"Ljuden" "Searching for Bergman"	Ulf Kvensler	Ulf Kvensler	April 8, 2015	July 19, 2015	0.654	1.13
In an effort to establish himself as "the guy" in Sweden for American celebrities, Bruce helps actor Jason Priestley maneuver Stockholm and locate people who worked with Priestley's hero, director Ingmar Bergman. Emma's struggles to impress her CEO become more difficult when a male co-worker latches onto her proposal and makes it his own. Nancy gets mad when she only learns about Bruce's engagement to Emma through Gustav. Guest stars: Illeana Douglas, Jason Priestley
13	3	"Skidresa" "Scrapbook"	Ulf Kvensler	David Sundin	April 15, 2015	July 26, 2015	0.725	1.16
Emma brings Bruce on the family skiing trip, while Birger tries his best to preserve its traditions. Gustav looks at an apartment. Guest stars: Anja Pärson, Illeana Douglas, Rachel Mohlin
14	4	"Svartsjuk" "Parental Guidance"	Ulf Kvensler	Greg Poehler, Bente Danielsson	April 22, 2015	July 26, 2015	0.677	1.12
Bruce's parents come to visit and start making plans for the wedding. Birger and Viveka have yet to secure any offers for their summer house, and it appears Birger may have something to do with that. Guest stars: Patrick Duffy, Illeana Douglas
15	5	"Jag Älskar Dig" "American Club"	Steffan Lindberg	Peter Arrhenius	April 29, 2015	August 5, 2015 (online)	0.683	N/A
Bruce goes out and tries to make some local friends, but misses some clues about the people he meets. Gustav has a plan for how to live for free. Bruce is bothered that Emma doesn't say "I love you" more often. Guest stars: Paul Simon, Kodjo Akolor
16	6	"Svensexa" "Swedish Bachelor Party"	Steffan Lindberg	David Sundin	May 13, 2015	August 5, 2015 (online)	0.740	N/A
Celebrity American actor Jack Black witnesses a kidnapping. Bruce and Emma get thrown surprise bachelor and bachelorette parties. Guest stars: Neve Campbell, Jack Black, Paolo Roberto, Kodjo Akolor
17	7	"Mr. Bajskorv" "Hitting the Wall"	Steffan Lindberg	Ulf Kvensler	May 20, 2015	August 5, 2015 (online)	0.544	N/A
Bruce is recruited as the coach for a youth basketball team, but struggles with the language barrier. As Birger faces the potential loss of his carpentry space, Viveka coaches him in being more assertive. Emma suffers the fallout from her bachelorette party. Guest star: Neve Campbell
18	8	"Sjukskriven" "Drug Deal"	Steffan Lindberg	Ulf Kvensler	May 27, 2015	August 5, 2015 (online)	0.547	N/A
Bruce tries to obtain some marijuana for Amy Poehler during her visit to Sweden. After nearly hitting the wall due to stress, Emma is placed on part-time sick leave, and is required to attend therapy group meetings, through which she tries meditation and stress management techniques. Gustav has to draw up a CV. Emma and Bruce consider the surname they will adopt in marriage. Guest stars: Amy Poehler, Neve Campbell
19	9	"Fästman" "Little Brucie"	Lisa James Larsson	Bente Danielsson, Greg Poehler	June 3, 2015	August 5, 2015 (online)	0.582	N/A
Emma is placed on full sick leave, which initially helps with her stress, but leads to conflict with Bruce as their differing worldviews become evident, leading her to question their future together. Aubrey Plaza has returned to Stockholm to apologize and reconcile with Bruce, but Bruce is skeptical about her intentions. Viveka tries to secure a DJ for the wedding. Guest star: Aubrey Plaza
20	10	"Bröllopet" "Sexy Dancing"	Lisa James Larsson	Greg Poehler	June 3, 2015	August 5, 2015 (online)	0.579	N/A
After watching a viral video online, Emma wants to have the wedding party dance into the church, but a problem arises in rehearsal. Gustav introduces his girlfriend to the family. Guest stars: Rachel Mohlin, Per Svensson, Amy Poehler, Aubrey Plaza

Note
A. The Swedish episode title is listed first, followed by the title used in the U.S. and Canada. The English titles are not necessarily translations of the Swedish ones.

== Reception ==
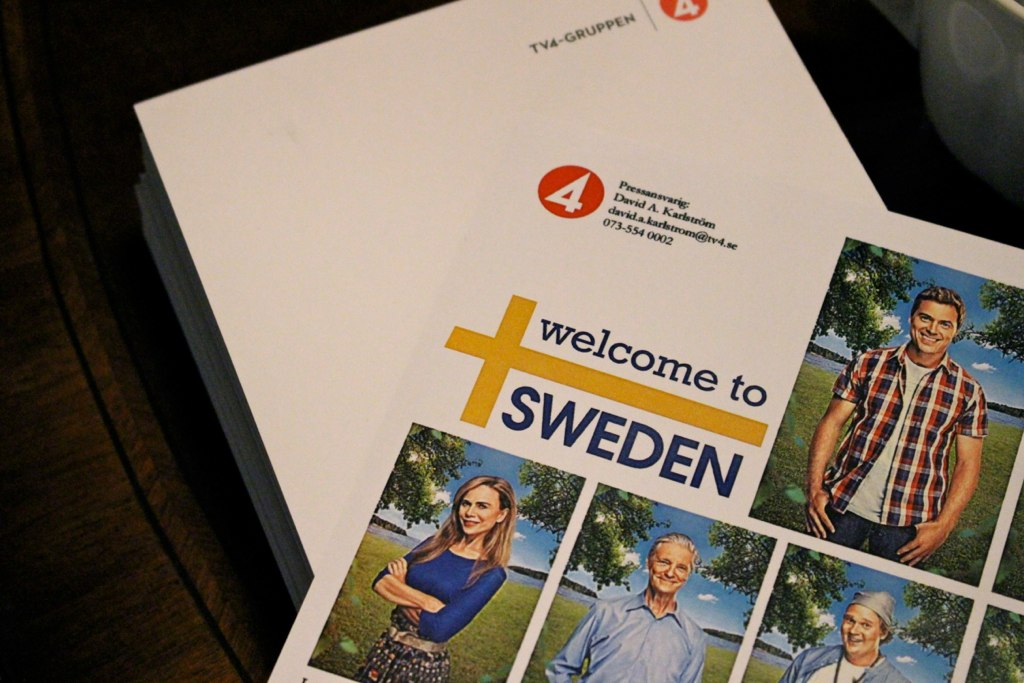

The first season of Welcome to Sweden received positive reviews. On Rotten Tomatoes it has a rating 82%, based on 28 reviews, with an average rating of 6.6/10. The site's critical consensus reads, "Charming and smartly composed, Welcome to Sweden offers fun summer fare from the talented Poehler siblings despite its familiar tropes." On Metacritic the season has a score of 72 out of 100, based on 22 critics, indicating "generally favorable reviews".

=== Swedish reception controversy ===
In May 2014, a Swedish TV columnist gave the first season finale of Welcome to Sweden a negative review. In response, Greg Poehler subjected the columnist to online harassment, posting demeaning and offensive comments under an assumed name in the comments section. Due to the severity of the abuse, containing what was described as "personal attacks," the on-line news site traced the IP address to what was likely Poehler's own computer. Faced with the evidence, Poehler confessed and apologized.

=== Awards and nominations ===
Year	Award	Category	Recipients	Outcome
2015	Monte-Carlo Television Festival	Best International Comedy TV Series	Entertainment One, FLX, Syskon	Won
2015	Monte-Carlo Television Festival	Outstanding Actress in a Comedy Series	Josephine Bornebusch	Nominated
2015	Monte-Carlo Television Festival	Outstanding Actor in a Comedy Series	Greg Poehler	Nominated

== International broadcast ==
In Indonesia, the series started on July 21, 2015 at 10:30 pm and can be seen on Star World with Indonesian subtitles. In Australia, the series premiered on The Comedy Channel on July 5, 2015.

In the United States, the series aired on NBC.

In Israel, it was broadcast on yes Oh.
