= The Stoolie =

- Directed by: John G. Avildsen; George Silano
- Written by: Larry Alexander; Eugene Price; Marc B. Ray
- Starring: Jackie Mason; Dan Frazer; Marcia Jean Kurtz
- Cinematography: John G. Alvidsen; Ralf D. Bode; Charles Clifton
- Edited by: Stan Bochner; Gerry Greenberg
- Music by: William Goldstein
- Distributed by: AVCO Embassy Pictures
- Release date: November 1972
- Running time: 90 minutes
- Country: United States
- Language: English

The Stoolie is a 1972 comedy thriller film co-directed by John G. Avildsen and George Silano and starring comedian Jackie Mason.

== Production ==
The film was produced under the working title Roger of Miami Beach.

== Reception ==
Time Out calls the film "quite a charmer in its modest way".

== See also ==
- List of American films of 1972
