= The Skinny (TV series) =

2016 web series

- The title card for the series
- Created by: Jessie Kahnweiler
- Starring: Jessie Kahnweiler; Illeana Douglas; Paul Dooley; Spencer Hill
- Country of origin: United States
- Original language: English

Production
- Producers: Joey Soloway; Paul Young

Original release
- Network: Refinery29
- Release: 2016

The Skinny is a 2016 web series starring Jessie Kahnweiler and Illeana Douglas and produced by Joey Soloway.

== Overview ==
A feminist YouTube personality struggles with bulimia.
