= Return to Sender (2015 film) =

- Theatrical film poster
- Directed by: Fouad Mikati
- Written by: Patricia Beauchamp; Joe Gossett
- Produced by: Candice Abela; Holly Wiersma
- Starring: Rosamund Pike; Shiloh Fernandez; Camryn Manheim; Illeana Douglas; Nick Nolte
- Cinematography: Russell Carpenter
- Music by: Daniel Hart
- Production companies: Boo Pictures; Holly Wiersma Productions; Voltage Pictures
- Distributed by: Image Entertainment
- Release date: August 14, 2015
- Running time: 96 minutes
- Country: United States
- Language: English

Return to Sender is a 2015 American rape and revenge psychological thriller film directed by Fouad Mikati and starring Rosamund Pike, Shiloh Fernandez, and Nick Nolte.

== Plot ==
Miranda Wells is a nurse living in a small town who is buying a new house. Her friend sets her up on a blind date with a man named Kevin. On the day of the date, Miranda finds someone outside her porch, whom she assumes is Kevin, and invites him in. He is initially polite but when his demeanour changes, Miranda asks him to leave and he refuses. He locks the front door then proceeds to violently attack and rape her.

After Miranda is found and taken to the hospital (by the real Kevin who arrives later), the police ask if she had ever seen the man before and she says that she had; he worked in the restaurant she recently visited. They promptly go and arrest William Finn. Miranda attempts to carry on with life as normal, but her real estate agent informs her, her house is no longer for sale as no one wants to buy a property where someone was assaulted. She also loses an upcoming promotion at work.

Miranda decides to write to William in prison, but her letter is returned to sender. She tries again multiple times until she finally receives a response - he has written back with "You win" on the envelope - and goes to visit him. He apologises repeatedly for what he did to her and she begins to visit him regularly. They become friendly and their meetings become flirtatious.

Later when William is released, he arrives uninvited at her home and she puts him to work fixing her front porch. When William goes to the local hardware store, Miranda's dad Mitchell realises who he is and where he is working, and he and Miranda fall out over her decision to stay in contact with him. One afternoon while working on the porch, Miranda brings William lemonade. He later tells her he is not feeling well and asks to lie down inside, which she agrees to. Upon entering the house, he collapses.

When William wakes up, he finds himself strapped to a bed in the basement. Miranda, who had planned revenge all along, admits to poisoning him with antifreeze. When he comes to again, he finds one of his hands has been amputated. William later awakens to find Miranda has performed a castration on him. As he wails out in pain, Miranda says, "You were right. I win."

The film ends with Miranda visiting her father. He tells her that he doesn't understand her and she replies by telling him William won't be coming around anymore.

== Cast ==
- Rosamund Pike as Miranda Wells
- Shiloh Fernandez as William Finn
- Nick Nolte as Mitchell Wells
- Camryn Manheim as Nancy
- Rumer Willis as Darlene
- Illeana Douglas as Judy
- Billy Slaughter as Kevin
- Scout Taylor-Compton as Crystal
- Ryan Phillippe as UPS Delivery Guy
- Marco St. John as Older Man

== Release ==
Return to Sender was released in the United Kingdom on May 22, 2015. Image Entertainment acquired the U.S. distribution rights to the film, and released the film on August 14, 2015, in a limited release.

== Reception ==
On Rotten Tomatoes, the film has a 14% approval rating based on reviews from 35 critics. On Metacritic it has a weighted average score of 23% based on reviews from 9 critics, indicating "generally unfavorable reviews".

Mark Kermode of The Observer rated it 3 out of 5 stars and wrote, "Gone Girl's Rosamund Pike brings icy zeal to her role as a rape survivor who starts visiting her assailant in jail". Benjamin Lee of The Guardian rated it 2 out of 5 stars and wrote, "There are few surprises in this cheapo thriller about a nurse who strikes up a relationship with the man who attacked her in her home." Geoffrey Macnab of The Independent rated it 2 out of 5 stars and wrote, "The film has the feel of a glorified TV movie and lurches into Misery-style melodrama in its final reel." Mike McCahill of The Daily Telegraph rated it 2 out of 5 stars and called it "cinematic clickbait that hides its weakest material behind spoilers, and hopes its audience will be gullible enough to proceed".
