= Write & Wrong =

2007 American television film

- Screenplay by: George Beckerman
- Directed by: Graeme Clifford
- Starring: Kirstie Alley; Eric Christian Olsen
- Music by: Jonathan Grossman
- Country of origin: United States
- Original language: English

Production
- Producers: Kirstie Alley; Michael Jaffe; Howard Braunstein; Richard C. Fischoff; Ted Bauman
- Cinematography: Tony Westman
- Editor: Scott Kelly
- Running time: 88 minutes
- Production company: Jaffe/Braunstein Films

Original release
- Network: Lifetime
- Release: June 3, 2007

Write & Wrong (also known as And She Was) is a 2007 Lifetime Television film directed by Graeme Clifford and starring Kirstie Alley and Eric Christian Olsen. It was filmed in Vancouver, Canada.

== Plot ==
Critically acclaimed screenwriter Byrdie Langdon becomes frustrated with the industry after her scripts are repeatedly rejected because she and her characters are too old. Byrdie recruits her nephew, Jason, to help sell her scripts. However, Jason's budding romance with an important studio executive could ruin their plans.

== Cast ==
- Kirstie Alley as Byrdie Langdon
- Eric Christian Olsen as Jason "Krueger" Langdon
- Stacy Grant as Andrea Davis
- Peter Cockett as Ray McDeere
- Britt Irven as Stacey Herskowitz
- Tobias Mehler as Richard Fleiss
- Rob Labelle as Steve Brooks
- Jerry Wasserman as Marty Rosen
- Malcom Stewart as Peter Langdon
- P. Lynn Johnson as Gloria Langdon
- Peter Hall as Big Bear Owner
- Nick Misura as Billy
- Alex Kliner as Jimmy
- Brian Linds as Carl
- David James Lewis as Lev Jordanson
- French Tickner as Pemberton Ballou
- Allan Grey as Dr. S. P. Alfred
- Jennifer Spence as Cathy
- Susan Wilkey as Amy
- Jason Carter as Video Clerk

== Reception ==
Variety's Brian Lowry praised the film for broaching the subject of Hollywood's age discrimination; however, he criticized the film's tone. The Hollywood Reporter praised Kirstie Alley's "wry and engaging" performance as Byrdie.
