= Jessie Kahnweiler =

American actress, writer, comedian, film director and YouTube personality

- Born: United States
- Occupations: Actress, writer, comedian, film director, YouTube personality

Jessie Kahnweiler is an American actress, writer, comedian, film director and YouTube personality.

Kahnweiler is also known for such television series as The Skinny. In 2024, she directed the documentary "Just the Tip".

== Filmography ==
Year	Title	Role	Notes
2024	Just the tip	Director	documentary
