= Divorce Corp =

- Directed by: Joseph Sorge
- Produced by: Joseph Sorge
- Narrated by: Drew Pinsky
- Release date: January 10, 2014
- Running time: 93 minutes
- Country: United States
- Language: English

Divorce Corp is a 2014 book and American documentary film produced and directed by Joseph Sorge and written by Joseph Sorge, James D. Scurlock, Philip Sternberg and Blake Harjes. The film is narrated by "Dr. Drew" Pinsky. The film explores corruption within the family court system of the United States.

== Reception ==
As of February 2020, Divorce Corp. had received an 81% positive rating among audience views on Rotten Tomatoes and a 44% Rotten rating with critics, based on 9 reviews.
