= Raoul Felder =

American lawyer (born 1939)

Raoul Lionel Felder (born in Brooklyn, New York, May 13, 1939) is an American divorce lawyer and matrimonial attorney. Felder has written eight books and has published numerous articles related to matrimonial law, politics and social issues. Felder is listed in New York Law Journal's 100 Most Powerful Lawyers in America and in all editions of Who's Who in America and Who's Who in American Law and was profiled in the May 3, 2004 issue of The New Yorker.

== Life ==
Raoul Lionel Felder was born in Williamsburg, Brooklyn, the son of British-born Jewish immigrants. His brother Jerome became famous as a songwriter under the pseudonym Doc Pomus, who wrote such songs as Save the Last Dance for Me, Viva Las Vegas, and This Magic Moment. He graduated from New York University School of Law and was admitted to the New York Bar in the same year. He attended New York University, graduating with a B.A. before studying medicine at the University of Bern College of Medicine in Switzerland.

== Career in law ==
Prior to practicing matrimonial law, Felder was a successful prosecutor. In 1961 he was appointed assistant U.S. attorney in the Eastern District of New York and in 1964, appointed special assistant U.S. attorney to argue appeals before the U.S. Court of Appeals.

Felder has practiced divorce law for more than forty years, and has represented clients such as Mayor Rudy Giuliani, Robin Givens, Stephanie Adams, Carol Channing, David Merrick, Riddick Bowe, the former Mrs. Carl Sagan, the former Mrs. Tom Clancy, the former Mrs. Patrick Ewing, and the former Mrs. Martin Scorsese. In 2003, he was appointed by Governor to the New York State Commission on Judicial Conduct and elected its chair in 2006.

Felder was made Honorary Police Commissioner by the Police Department of the City of New York in 2000. He was a Member of the Board of Directors of Cop Cares and the New York City Economic Development Committee. He received the Defender of Jerusalem Award from Israeli Prime Minister Yitzhak Shamir in 1990.

== Controversy ==
In 2003, Felder counseled Israeli leaders to consider threatening the expulsion of Palestinians from Israel, the West Bank, and Gaza Strip. Felder and Jackie Mason wrote, "We have paralyzed ourselves by our sickening fear of World Opinion, which is why we find it impossible to face one simple fact: We will never win this war unless we immediately threaten to drive every Arab out of Israel if the killing doesn't stop."

== Bibliography ==
- Divorce: The Way Things Are, Not The Way Things Should Be, published by World Publishing Company (1971)
- Lawyers Guide To Equitable Distribution, published by Legis Press, Ltd. (1988)
- Encyclopedia of Matrimonial Clauses, a currently published professional book with 27 updated releases, National Law Journal Press (1990–2003)
- Getting Away With Murder, Simon & Schuster, (published March 1996) (co-author) (book concerning domestic violence, published in hard and soft cover)
- Bare Knuckle Negotiation, published by Wiley & Sons (2004)
- Reflection in a Mirror: Of Love, Loss, Death and Divorce (A Memoir), published by Barricade Books (October 19, 2012)

=== With Jackie Mason ===
- Guide to New York and Los Angeles Restaurants, Dove Books (1998)
- Survival Guide to New York, Avon Books (1997)
- Schmucks!: Our Favorite Fakes, Frauds, Lowlifes, Liars, the Armed and Dangerous, and Good Guys Gone Bad, HarperCollins (April 2007)

=== Legal articles ===
- "Grounds For Divorce", "Property Settlement" and "Children and Divorce", McGraw-Hill (1972)
- "Choice of Forum: Family Court vs. Supreme Court", published in a collection of articles in book entitled New York Matrimonial Practice published by The Practicing Law Institute (1978)
- "Scullduggery and Other Inequities", Cardozo Law Journal (1986)
- "A History of New York Divorce Law in the Last Hundred Years", New York Law Journal (1988)

== See also ==
- Laura Wasser
- James Sexton (attorney)
