= Greg Poehler =

American actor (born 1974)

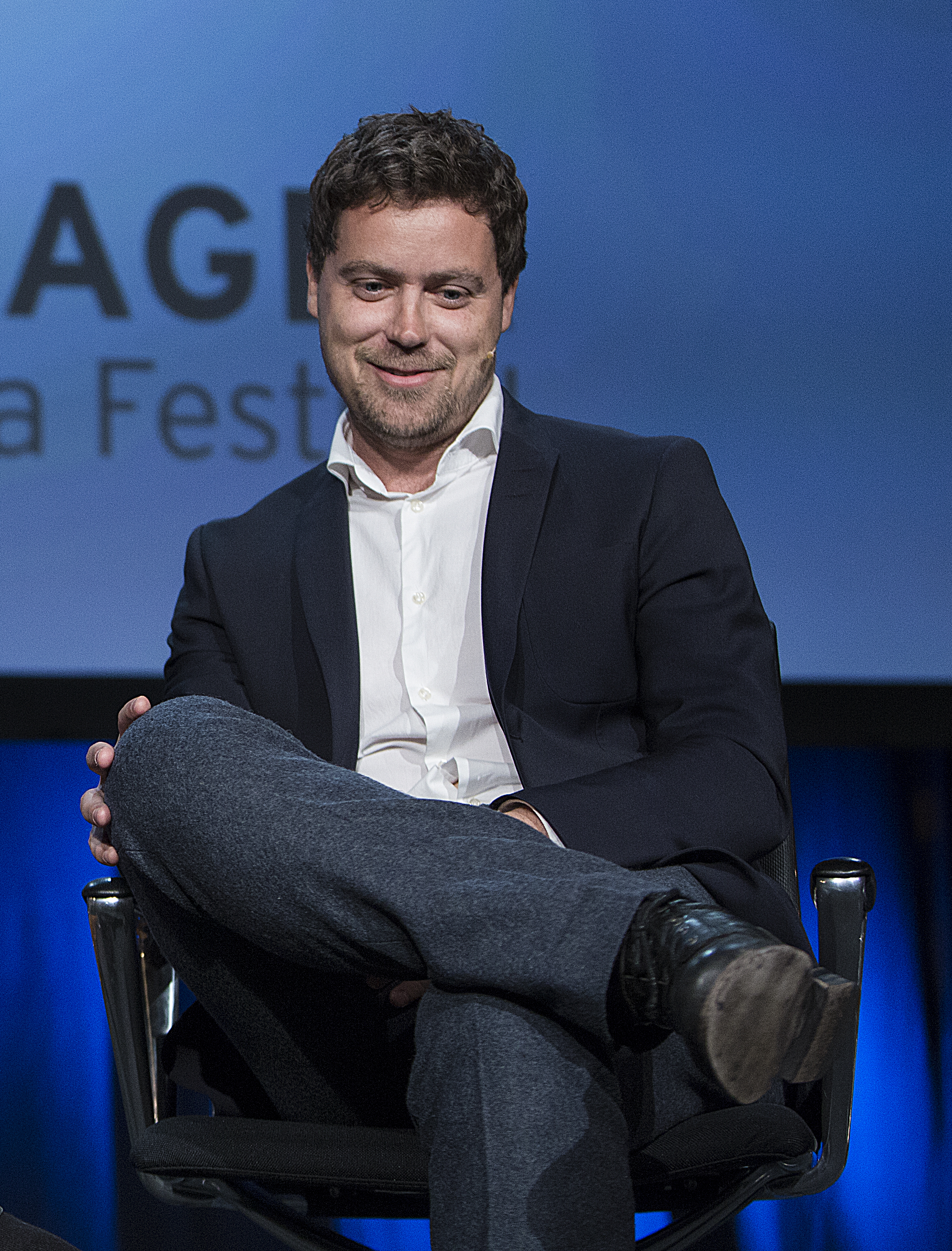
- Poehler in 2014
- Born: Gregory Milmore Poehler; 11 October 1974 (age 51); Boston, Massachusetts, U.S.
- Citizenship: United States; Sweden (from 2015)
- Occupations: Actor, comedian, producer, writer, attorney
- Years active: 2012–present
- Height: 5 ft 11 in (1.80 m) tall 227 lb (103 kg)
- Spouse: Charlotta Meder (m. 2006)
- Children: 3
- Relatives: Amy Poehler (sister)

Gregory Milmore Poehler (/ˈpoʊlər/ POH-lər; born October 11, 1974) is an American actor, comedian, producer, writer, and attorney. He created and starred in the Swedish sitcom Welcome to Sweden.

== Early life ==
Poehler was born in Boston and raised in the suburb of Burlington. He is the son of high school teachers Eileen Frances (née Milmore) and William Grinstead Poehler. His older sister is actress and comedian Amy Poehler. Poehler earned a Bachelor of Arts from Boston College in 1996 before attending the Fordham University School of Law, where he earned a Juris Doctor. He was admitted to the New York and Massachusetts bar associations and the United States Federal Courts for the Southern District of New York and the Fourth Circuit Court of Appeals. Finding success as a comedian, he left his day job as a lawyer to pursue a full-time career in show business, in large part influenced by his sister.

In 2006, Poehler graduated from Stockholm University with a masters in European intellectual property law.

== Career ==
After graduating from law school, Poehler moved to the West Village of Manhattan and worked as an attorney in New York City and Sweden, where he specialized in intellectual property law.

After twelve years as an attorney, in 2012 Poehler started doing stand-up comedy in Sweden. At the same time, he began writing the script for what became his first TV series, Welcome to Sweden, in which he plays the lead part. In addition to acting he has roles as head writer and producer. His sister, Amy Poehler, decided to produce the show after proofreading the script.

He also starred in You Me Her, a TV series about a three-way romantic relationship.

== Personal life ==
Poehler moved to Stockholm with Charlotta Meder, his Swedish girlfriend, in 2006 before they married. They have three children. In 2015, Poehler became a naturalised Swedish citizen while retaining his U.S. citizenship.

== Filmography ==
Year	Title	Role	Notes
2014–2015	Welcome to Sweden	Bruce Evans	Main (20 episodes)
2016–2020	You Me Her	Jack Trakarsky	Main
2019	Wine Country	Doctor Dickswing	Film
2021	Moxie	News Anchor	Film

=== Other ===
Year	Title	Role	Notes
2014–2015	Welcome to Sweden	Creator, writer, executive producer	(20 episodes)
2014	Hasselhoff - en svensk talkshow	Himself	Guest (1 episode)
2014	TV-Domarna	Himself	Guest (1 episode)
2014	HuffPost Live Conversations	Himself	Guest (1 episode)
2014	Partaj	Himself	Guest (1 episode)
2014–2016	Today	Himself	Guest (3 episodes)
2015	Gomorron	Himself	Guest (1 episode)
2015	The Jimmy Star Show with Ron Russell	Himself	Guest (1 episode)
2015	Late Night with Seth Meyers	Himself	Guest (1 episode)
2015	Fångarna på fortet	Himself	Guest (1 episode)
2015, 2017	Home & Family	Himself	Guest (2 episodes)
2018	Sidewalks Entertainment	Himself	Guest (1 episode)
2024	Kirk Minihane Show Debate	Lost to Montante	Guest (1 episode)
