= Ninja Burger =

Website and tabletop role-playing game

The Ninja Burger logo.

Ninja Burger (忍者バーガー) is a parody website started in late 1999, purporting that a sect of noble ninja have taken to secretly delivering fast food meals, anywhere, anytime, within 30 minutes or less. Failure to deliver within the ascribed time limit results in seppuku. Some of Ninja Burger's rivals include Pirate Pizza, Otaku Bell, and Samurai Burger. The site riffs on many of the same points as Real Ultimate Power, another ninja parody website.

Ninja Burger became well known after appearing on and becoming an affiliate of Fark, and soon after it was turned into a role-playing game. The site has also spawned a series of comic strips, several short films, a second role-playing game, a card game, a multimedia CD, and a book. On March 9, 2003, portions of a commercial for the website aired on the Food Network; the full version of this commercial is now available on YouTube.

== RPGs ==
Ninja Burger
- Ninja Burger 2nd Edition Cover
- Designers: Michael Fiegel
- Publishers: aethereal FORGE
- Publication: 2006
- Genres: Modern/Humor
- Systems: PDQ

=== First Edition ===
According to the Ninja Burger website, the first edition of the game was published by 9th Level Games in 2001 using a variant of the BEER Engine used in their Kobolds Ate My Baby! game.

=== Second Edition ===
A second edition of the Ninja Burger RPG was published as a PDF in March 2006, and is available in print through Key20 as of August, 2006 (ISBN 0-97931-960-9). It uses an all new ruleset based on Atomic Sock Monkey Press' Prose Descriptive Qualities (PDQ) system. The game features a campaign set in San Francisco, California, which is (according to the back story) the home of Ninja Burger Headquarters. Unlike the original game, it allows players to take on specific roles within the organization—such as chef, driver, etc. -- in addition to the baseline role of "ninja". It also greatly expands upon the scope and scale of the original setting; whereas the 9th Level Games' game was designed for 30-minute game sessions where just about everyone died at the end, the 2nd Edition is designed for longer campaigns that allow characters to grow and develop as they normally would in most RPGs.

Like other games utilizing the PDQ system (including Dead Inside (DI); Monkey, Ninja, Pirate, Robot: the RPG (MNPR:RPG); and Truth & Justice (T&J)), Ninja Burger is notable for the flexibility and simplicity of its rule systems. The core mechanic is to add 2d6 plus a freeform statistic or set of statistics, and compare to a difficulty number, either a fixed difficulty number or the opponent's roll. In conflicts, the amount which you beat another character's roll by is the amount of damage or failure ranks (see below). Player statistics are rated in five named ranks: Poor [-2], Average [+0], Good [+2], Expert [+4], and Master [+6].

Conflicts result in the accumulation of either "failure ranks" (which recover at the end of the contest) or "damage ranks" (which may take longer to heal). Each point of either type means that the loser must choose a statistic to downgrade by one rank. So if you lose a conflict roll by 3, you must lower three stats each by one rank, or one stat by three ranks (with a minimum of Poor: -2). You can choose any stat to take your damage in—i.e. you can downgrade your "Accounting" quality based on a hit in a fight. When you can't lower your stats any more (i.e. a hit when all stats are at Poor [-2]), then you have lost the contest.

Ninja Burger adds several elements to the system, including various Honor mechanics (along with a Seppuku system should you lose too much honor) and Ninja Magic. Particularly noteworthy is the role of the Dispatcher; more than just a Game Master, the Dispatcher is an active participant in the game, being a member of the team and, in almost every respect, just another Player Character.

=== No Honor Edition ===
A special No Honor Edition edition of the Ninja Burger RPG premiered at Gen Con in August 2008 (ISBN 0-97931-961-7). As the name suggests, one of the major changes was to remove the leveling mechanism (Honor) from the game, along with other features and content to produce a slimmed-down volume in the shape and spirit of the First Edition game.

== Card game ==
A popular card game based on the Ninja Burger license was also published by Steve Jackson Games in November, 2003 (ISBN 1-55634-610-7). It shares only the core concept with the Ninja Burger RPG, using a completely different set of rules and game mechanics designed and developed by Steve Jackson. It was illustrated by Greg Hyland, creator of Lethargic Lad.

A supplement to the card game entitled Sumo-Size Me was published in Spring, 2005 (ISBN 1-55634-741-3), and was also illustrated by Greg Hyland. The supplement was bundled with the original rules and published in 2009 as the Ninja Burger Secret Ninja Death Touch edition (UPC 837654–320259).

A Russian translation of the original card game, entitled Ниндзя Бургер, was also released in 2009.

== Ninja Burger Employee Handbook ==
The Ninja Burger: Honorable Employee Handbook originally appeared as a self-published PDF through the website RPGNow, and was published in 2006 through Citadel Press (ISBN 0-8065-2796-X). Originally slated for release on June 6, it appeared in bookstores two weeks early and was available over the Memorial Day weekend along with Maddox's The Alphabet of Manliness, another release from Citadel's Rebel Base Books line.

The Handbook purports to be a real employee handbook from Ninja Burger, and as such is an obvious parody of "real-life" employee handbooks. It includes material such as: Ninja Burger History, Fitness, Recipes, Safety Tips, Etiquette, Salary & Benefits, Health Coverage and the company's (literal) Termination policy. Also included are a Ninja Burger job application, menu and employee newsletter.

== Web comics ==
Several long-running webcomics have appeared on the Ninja Burger website. The longest-running is called the NB Crew; drawn by Rocco Commisso, it documents the adventures of a small Ninja Burger crew (consisting of Max, Doughna, Steve, Minja and Jade) as they battle various enemies. Other strips include the original (and now defunct) Ninja Burger Comic Strip (by Lazarus Berry) and The Ninja Shift (by Recca Hanabishi). Each strip exists in its own Ninja Burger universe, and the characters, situations and laws of physics operate independently within each strip. None follows any "official storyline," and each is developed independently of the others.

Ninja Burger has also been referenced on other webcomic sites, including All About Eda, Stalag 99, Sam and Fuzzy (coincidental, according to the author), Megatokyo, and Sluggy Freelance. It is also featured as a brief "commercial" in the S.T.E.A.M. anime fandub movie.

== Influences ==
Though not directly influenced by it, Ninja Burger's concept is similar to a Saturday Night Live sketch from the late 1970s by John Belushi entitled "Samurai Delicatessen" In this skit, Belushi played a samurai working in a New York City deli who would commit seppuku if customers were unhappy with his sandwiches (which he prepared using his katana). Other likely influences include Snow Crash, which features a ninja-like deliveryman named Hiro Protagonist who works for a Mafia pizzeria and would be assassinated if a delivery took longer than half an hour, and "A Fistful of Yen", a short parody of Enter the Dragon from Kentucky Fried Movie.

== Day of the Ninja ==
Day of the Ninja logo.

In 2003, the creators of Ninja Burger declared that December 5 would be celebrated as Day of the Ninja. On this day, people are encouraged to dress as ninja, engage in ninja-related activities, and spread information on ninja online. December 5 was originally chosen because December 5, 2003 marked the release of Tom Cruise's film The Last Samurai (which featured a scene where samurai battled ninja). Since then the focus has shifted towards the more familiar Pirates versus Ninjas conflict, and the day has served as a virtual counterpoint to International Talk Like a Pirate Day.

The first year's events were small, but in 2004 the holiday gained international support from a group of French performers, who staged elaborate ninja poses in front of famous landmarks (such as the Eiffel Tower). This led to increased press coverage from, among other things, the French Disney magazine Picsou. The holiday drew support from the popular Ask a Ninja website in 2006; a podcast on November 30 of that year discussed an alternative explanation for the holiday's origin, set 1400 years ago. The release of the Ask a Ninja DVD was timed to coincide with that year's Day of the Ninja (Dec. 5, 2006), and helped garner additional press coverage. The DVD release party itself was heavily covered by the "blogosphere", with numerous references to the Day of the Ninja. Perhaps not coincidentally, Pirates of the Caribbean: Dead Man's Chest was also released on DVD on December 5, 2006; the Ask a Ninja website had already added to the Pirates vs Ninjas meme when "the Ninja" gave a blistering review of the film in an earlier podcast.

2007 saw official acknowledgment from the press including NPR's Morning Edition, as well as a coordinated ninja-themed video game announcement from EA and the official release of the Pirates Vs. Ninjas Dodgeball website. G4 Network's Attack of the Show! also celebrated 2007's Day of the Ninja by replacing usual host Kevin with the "Ask a Ninja" Ninja, and the network also ran a Ninja Warrior marathon, with many more episodes than usual throughout the day. The Day of the Ninja is one of only two days of the year that players can get the "Arr..." badge in Saints Row II; it is one of the badges required for Kingpin.

Ninja Burger's Day of the Ninja website features a Day of the Ninja PSA that was created by Fulltimeninjas.com.

Another site, ninjaday.org, has independently declared December 5 as International Creep Like a Ninja Day. Other possible names include Die Like a Pirate Day, Stalk Like a Ninja Day, Sneak Like a Ninja Day, Move Like a Ninja Day, or simply Ninja Day. According to the official website, this site and others of its kind are unrelated to Ninja Burger or the original Day of the Ninja website, although their efforts are supported.
