= Swashbucklers of the 7 Skies =

Tabletop fantasy role-playing game

Swashbucklers of the 7 Skies is a role-playing game by Chad Underkoffler, published by Evil Hat Productions in 2009.

== Description ==
Swashbucklers of the 7 Skies is a swashbuckling RPG that is set in a fantasy world where players can adventure across islands that float in the sky. Swashbucklers of the 7 Skies was intended an homage to pulp swashbuckling stories, including a full chapter discussing the tropes of the genre. Swashbucklers took place in an entirely original setting, where sky pirates battle each other in ships that fly across the sky. Chad Underkoffler used his PDQ system for this game, which has some similar characteristics to Fate – including its Fortes (or qualities) to be applied as freeform occupations, motivations, histories or organizations. Swashbucklers used a new variant of the PDQ system which Underkoffler renamed PDQ#; Underkoffler revamped his system mechanics for the first time, as PDQ# gave foibles and techniques to characters while its combat system made conflict more tactical. Swashbucklers had its own ship combat system to meet the needs of the setting.

== Publication history ==
Chad Underkoffler had been designing a game about sky pirates as his first independent role-playing game for Atomic Sock Monkey Press, but put that game aside to develop Dead Inside (2004) instead. Due to a business arrangement between Atomic Sock Monkey Press and Evil Hat Productions, Underkoffler was finally able to publish his game as Swashbucklers of the 7 Skies in 2009. The companies were able to make a joint arrangement to produce the game, despite a disagreement over the size; Fred Hicks from Evil Hat persuaded Underkoffler to use a 7" x 10" format, which was slightly smaller than the print size of a traditional role-playing game.

== Reception ==
Shannon Appelcline, in his 2011 book Designers & Dragons, noted that this was a more traditional RPG for Evil Hat, and commented: "Whereas The Zorcerer of Zo had received some criticism for its rough development of superb ideas, Swashbucklers of the 7 Skies was a more polished game, showing the benefits of indie designers working together in a larger design house." After its publication, Swashbucklers received a Silver ENnie, and was runner-up for the Indie Game of the Year.
