= Qlippoth (disambiguation) =

The qlippoth are the representation of evil or impure spiritual forces in Jewish Kabbalah and Hermetic Qabalah.

Qlippoth or Qliphoth may also refer to:

- Qlippoth, fictional undead in Dead Inside
- Qlippoth, fictional fiends in the Pathfinder Roleplaying Game
- Qlipoth, Aeon of Preservation in Honkai: Star Rail
- Qliphoth, a fictional tree in Devil May Cry 5
