= Ask a Ninja =

Comedy podcast about ninjas

- Genre: Comedy

Cast and voices
- Hosted by: The Ninja

Publication
- Original release: November 2005 – December 2011

Ask A Ninja is a series of comedy videos about the image of ninja in popular culture available in podcast and vodcast form, as well as in mov and WMV file formats. The original episodes were released between 2005 and 2011. On 7th April 2025 the series was rebooting and is currently ongoing.

In December 2007, television industry trade magazine TelevisionWeek (www.tvweek.com) reported that Ask a Ninja creators Kent Nichols and Douglas Sarine made about $100,000 a month in ad revenue and income from merchandising and licensing from the show. In January 2007 Forbes listed The Ninja as one of the top "Fictional Celebrities" on the web.

== Overview ==
The series, created by Los Angeles improvisational comedians Kent Nichols and Douglas Sarine, features a ninja who answers e-mails from "viewers" (a similar format to Ask Zorak and Strong Bad Email, which was an influence on Ask A Ninja's creators according to Kent Nichols). According to an interview, Ask A Ninja was originally supposed to be an animated show about two Ninjas living in Orange County.

=== Podcast ===
The episodes feature constant and erratic camera-angle changes, as well as enthusiastic and wild hand gestures by the Ninja. Each episode usually ranges from four to seven minutes, usually ending with Ninja's signature remark to each questioner: "I look forward to killing you soon!" New episodes had been released bi-weekly during the height of the podcast's popularity. Starting with Episode 23, "Ninternships", the behind-the-scenes-team decided to have sponsors for their episodes.

Although episodes 1 to 16 are answered by Ninja in front of a featureless blue background, the action sometimes goes to other places, such as inside a car or another house. Episodes after the "Ninja Omnibus" episode use the Ninja edited onto a red circle gradient background, and episodes after the "BBQ" episode changed to blue.

The episodes start with the song "I Am Ninja", performed by The Neu Tickles and written by satirist Brently Heilbron.

== Re-launch ==
After a nearly two-year hiatus, during which time only specials were released, the web series relaunched in October 2010 as a daily series with new videos each week day. The new lineup featured an experimental sketch show along with a weekly wrap up show (The Stare) and a showcase of emerging web shows liked by the Ninja. Web series producer Brett Register, creator of The Crew, A Good Knight's Quest and Craig & The Werewolf, was hired on as the new day-to-day producer-director for Ask a Ninja. This run concluded in December 2011.

In 2014, five of the earliest episodes were re-performed and released as Ask a Ninja reMASTERed.

In 2015, nine episodes featuring jokes about ninjas submitted by fans were produced as NinJokes.

In April 2025, Ask a Ninja's Youtube channel became active again, posting a video titled 'Ask A Ninja Omnibus What Year Is This?'

== Advertising and other appearances ==
Ask A Ninja has widespread popular appeal, and has appeared in numerous media outlets.

Douglas Sarine was once asked to report as a guest film critic on National Public Radio's show, All Things Considered; his review there of Pirates of the Caribbean: Dead Man's Chest is classified as a special delivery episode. In a 5- to 10-minute piece Ask A Ninja interviewed Blades of Glory stars Will Ferrell and Jon Heder for which he asked a series of movie related questions. At the end of the interview he ice skates circles around Olympic gold medalist Scott Hamilton. One notable episode was shot in the MythBusters warehouse with Jamie and Adam, where he disputed the theory of gravity, but when asked for proof, claimed he would have to perform a move in which he would simultaneously pull out both their brains.

At the end of older episodes, the Ninja advertised the Ninja-Mart Store, where viewers may buy "Ask A Ninja"-related merchandise. More recent episodes have ended with Ninja advertising Ask A Ninja's first DVD release in the style of HeadOn commercials. He's also advertised The Simpsons Game as well as Doritos. Ask a Ninja also started hosting their videos with CastFire's video hosting service, likely to add to their monetization strategy.

Recently, Nichols and Sarine appeared as commentators on VH1's Best Week Ever. The Ninja, however, does not appear with them. The Ninja appears alongside Margaret Cho in Liam Kyle Sullivan's "Let Me Borrow That Top" music video. The Ninja has also appeared as a judge on Yahoo's talent-show contest.

On April 11, 2007 episode of The Showbiz Show, the Ninja, in a pre-recorded segment, provided a short review of the first episode of the final season of The Sopranos.

Jessica Lee Rose appeared with Ninja in an episode called "Jessica Lee Rose" to celebrate his series' 50th episode anniversary and to comment on the death of lonelygirl15. Vodcast Bikini News featured an extensive interview with Nichols (against the familiar Ask A Ninja background) discussing the origins of the show.

=== Day of the Ninja involvement ===
Since 2006, Ask a Ninja has been involved in organizing and coordinating events for the annual Day of the Ninja, December 5.

On December 5, 2006, the Ninja made his first live onstage appearance at the Ask a Ninja DVD Release Party, where he played the guitar after opening act The Neu Tickles. The Ninja made his second live stage appearance at the El Rey Theatre on December 5, 2007 with Patton Oswalt and Hard 'n Phirm. On December 5, 2007, The Ninja guest starred on Attack of the Show alongside Olivia Munn on G4 while Kevin was on the road hosting live from people's homes.

== Other releases ==
- The DVD of Ask a Ninja was released on December 5, 2006. In addition to 30 episodes of Ask a Ninja, it includes commentaries, Easter eggs and bonus shorts.
- Kent Nichols and Douglas Sarine have written an Ask a Ninja book (The Ninja Handbook: This Book Looks Forward to Killing You Soon).
- Ask a Ninja has also been released to Xbox Live Marketplace.

== Episodes ==
| Episode | Title | Released |
|---|---|---|
| 1 | "Ninja Mart Store" | November 24, 2005 |
| 2 | "Ninja Santa" | January 5, 2006 |
| 3 | "Ninja Training" | January 6, 2006 |
| 4 | "Hiring A Ninja" | January 8, 2006 |
| 5 | "Ninja Skills" | January 9, 2006 |
| 6 | "Master of Disguise" | January 16, 2006 |
| 7 | "Ninja Grub" | January 18, 2006 |
| 8 | "Roger"* | January 25, 2006 |
| 9 | "Ninja Love" | February 1, 2006 |
| 10 | "Ninja Metal" | February 9, 2006 |
| 11 | "Ninja Dogs" | February 14, 2006 |
| 12 | "Ninja Colds" | February 22, 2006 |
| 13 | "Ninjas Hate Clooney" | March 7, 2006 |
| 14 | "Ninja Gifts" | March 8, 2006 |
| 15 | "Deciding Like a Ninja" | March 16, 2006 |
| 16 | "How To Kill a Ninja" | March 24, 2006 |
| 17 | "Ninja Omnibus" | March 31, 2006 |
| 18 | "Minjas" | April 9, 2006 |
| 19 | "Physics" | April 19, 2006 |
| 20 | "KillaCon" | May 1, 2006 |
| 21 | "Revolution Cubed" | May 30, 2006 |
| 22 | "Ninja Excuses" | June 15, 2006 |
| 23 | "Ninternships" | July 5, 2006 |
| 24 | "Thr33" | July 14, 2006 |
| 25 | "Summer Jobs" | September 1, 2006 |
| 26 | "Least Favorite" | September 6, 2006 |
| 27 | "Standing in Lines" | September 9, 2006 |
| 28 | "Niniature Golf" | October 15, 2006 |
| 29 | "BBQ" | December 22, 2006 |
| 30 | "Ninja Omnideuce" | January 3, 2007 |
| 31 | "TechNINlogy" | January 12, 2007 |
| 32 | "Ninja Dates" | January 24, 2007 |
| 33 | "Hidey's Disease" | February 3, 2007 |
| 34 | "The Bloody's" | February 8, 2007 |
| 35 | "Ninja Poetry" | February 16, 2007 |
| 36 | "Clubs" | March 2, 2007 |
| 37 | "Last Words" | March 10, 2007 |
| 38 | "College Tips" | March 22, 2007 |
| 39 | "Mirrors" | April 12, 2007 |
| 40 | "Scene Kids" | May 4, 2007 |
| 41 | "Film Ninjoir" | May 10, 2007 |
| 42 | "Ninja Sayings" | May 18, 2007 |
| 43 | "Ninja Names" | June 1, 2007 |
| 44 | "Commas" | June 8, 2007 |
| 45 | "Omnitrois" | June 15, 2007 |
| 46 | "UFC" | June 29, 2007 |
| 47 | "Ninja Movie Pitch" | July 19, 2007 |
| 48 | "Ninja Recipes" | July 26, 2007 |
| 49 | "Ninja Lifespan" | August 24, 2007 |
| 50 | "Jessica Lee Rose" | August 31, 2007 |
| 51 | "Randominja" | September 6, 2007 |
| 52 | "Ninja Baby Sitters" | September 13, 2007 |
| 53 | "Bob's Destiny" | September 19, 2007 |
| 54 | "Vakilltions" | September 26, 2007 |
| 55 | "Celebrity Weapons" | October 3, 2007 |
| 56 | "Back in the Day" | October 10, 2007 |
| 57 | "Ninjazines" | October 25, 2007 |
| 58 | "Sameness" | November 1, 2007 |
| 59 | "OmniJeff" | November 15, 2007 |
| 60 | "OmniWorld" | November 29, 2007 |
| 61 | "OmniPresent" | December 7, 2007 |
| 62 | "Terminal Paper" | January 25, 2008 |
| 63 | "Datinjas" | January 31, 2008 |
| 64 | "Ninja Theme Songs" | February 8, 2008 |
| 65 | "Ninja Floor Plans" | February 15, 2008 |
| 66 | "Ninja Comebacks" | February 23, 2008 |
| 67 | "Extra Time" | March 21, 2008 |
| 68 | "Legendary Weapons" | March 27, 2008 |
| 69 | "Most Fatal Thing" | April 10, 2008 |
| 70 | "Omnibutt" | April 24, 2008 |
| 71 | "Dos and Don'ts" | May 9, 2008 |
| 72 | "Ninterview" | May 16, 2008 |
| 73 | "Major Ninja" | May 30, 2008 |
| 74 | "Ninja Moves" | May 30, 2008 |
| 75 | "Oh Brother" | May 30, 2008 |
| 76 | "Ninjas Vs. Crazy People" | May 31, 2008 |
| 77 | "Ninjenglish" | June 27, 2008 |
| 78 | "Ninjalympics" | July 29, 2008 |
| 79 | "Ninja Hangouts" | August 22, 2008 |
| 80 | "OmniOmni Part 1" | August 29, 2008 |
| 81 | "OmniOmni Part 2" | September 8, 2008 |
| 82 | "Ninja Book Club" | September 19, 2008 |
| 83 | "Super Light" | October 27, 2008 |
| 84 | "Question 84" | December 4, 2008 |
| 85 | "Question 85" | December 15, 2008 |
| 86 | "Question 86" | April 29, 2009 |
| 87 | "Question 87" | October 12, 2010 |
| 88 | "Question 88" | October 19, 2010 |
| 89 | "Question 89" | October 26, 2010 |
| 90 | "Ninja Beards" | November 2, 2010 |
| 91 | "Question 91" | November 9, 2010 |
| 92 | "NASA" | November 16, 2010 |
| 93 | "Black Friday" | November 23, 2010 |
| 94 | "Yo Mama" | November 30, 2010 |
| 95 | "Nature's Ninjas" | December 7, 2010 |
| 96 | "Atlantis" | December 14, 2010 |
| 97 | "Biberbot Wants To Kill Us All" | December 21, 2010 |
| 98 | "Santa" | December 24, 2010 |
| 99 | "Question 98" | December 28, 2010 |
| 100 | "Question 99" | January 4, 2011 |
| 101 | "Theme Song" | January 11, 2011 |
| 102 | "That Glow" | January 26, 2011 |
| 103 | "Ninjatives" | January 26, 2011 |
| 104 | "Baby Proof" | February 2, 2011 |
| 105 | "Question 104" | February 11, 2011 |
| 106 | "Call of Duty Vs. Halo" | February 22, 2011 |
| 107 | "Ninja Birthday" | March 1, 2011 |
| 108 | "Train'd" | March 8, 2011 |
| 109 | "Smoke Bomb!" | March 15, 2011 |
| 110 | "Question 109" | March 22, 2011 |
| 111 | "Musical Instruments" | March 29, 2011 |
| 112 | "Question 111" | April 5, 2011 |
| 113 | "Reality TV" | April 12, 2011 |
| 114 | "Ninja Grandma" | April 19, 2011 |
| 115 | "Dead Necks" | April 26, 2011 |
| 116 | "Question 115" | May 3, 2011 |
| 117 | "The Environment" | May 10, 2011 |
| 118 | "Weakness" | May 17, 2011 |
| 119 | "Real Job" | May 24, 2011 |
| 120 | "Omnibus" | May 31, 2011 |
| 121 | "Omnibus" | June 7, 2011 |
| 122 | "Marriage" | June 14, 2011 |
| 123 | "Omnibus to Awesometown" | June 21, 2011 |
| 124 | "Ninja Meeting" | June 28, 2011 |
| 125 | "Monsters" | July 5, 2011 |
| 126 | "Yard Sale" | July 12, 2011 |
| 127 | "Omnibus" | September 13, 2011 |
| 128 | "Omnibus" | October 12, 2011 |
| 129 | "Omnibus" | November 1, 2011 |
| 130 | "Ninja Day MiniSode" | December 4, 2011 |

=== Special deliveries ===
| Number | Title | Released |
|---|---|---|
| SD 1 | "What is Podcasting?" | March 7, 2006 |
| SD 2 | "Doogtoons.com Asks A Ninja 1" | April 12, 2006 |
| SD 3 | "Doogtoons.com Asks A Ninja 2" | May 6, 2006 |
| SD 4 | "Net Neutrality" | May 11, 2006 |
| SD 5 | "Doogtoons.com Asks A Ninja 3" | May 17, 2006 |
| SD 6 | "Doogtoons.com Asks A Ninja – Ninjas and The Matrix" | June 2, 2006 |
| SD 7 | "Pirates of the Caribbean: Dead Man's Chest Review" | July 7, 2006 |
| SD 7.5 | "Pirates of the Caribbean 3" | May 25, 2007 |
| SD 8 | "Doogtoons.com Asks A Ninja – Star Wars" | July 30, 2006 |
| SD 9 | "AKON Weapons Policy" | August 28, 2006 |
| SD 10 | "Pop!Tech" | October 26, 2006 |
| SD 11 | Ninja Day" | November 30, 2006 |
| SD 12 | "The Ninja's First Live Appearance" | December 12, 2006 |
| SD 13 | "SXSW 10 Years" | March 17, 2007 |
| SD 14 | Blades of Glory" | March 27, 2007 |

| Number | Title | Released |
|---|---|---|
| SD 15 | Mythbustin' Out All Over" | April 25, 2007 |
| SD 15.5 | Robot Jamie" | June 21, 2007 |
| SD 16 | "Global Warming" | July 7, 2007 |
| SD 17 | "Writer's Strike" | November 10, 2007 |
| SD 18 | "A Very Ninja Christmas Pt. 1" | December 13, 2007 |
| SD 19 | "A Very Ninja Christmas Pt. 2" | December 23, 2007 |
| SD 20 | "Future of Online Video" | May 22, 2008 |
| SD 21 | "AskANinjaBook.com Shout Out" | September 2, 2008 |
| SD 22 | "The Ninja Handbook, Audiobook Part 1" | September 8, 2008 |
| SD 23 | "The Ninja Handbook, Audiobook Part 2" | September 25, 2008 |
| SD 24 | "Ninjas Helping Pirates" | March 5, 2009 |
| SD 25 | "Tooling on Superheroes" | March 27, 2009 |
| SD 26 | "Tweetbomb NIN/JA" | April 3, 2009 |
| SD 27 | "TED (United Tunnels of America)" | April 22, 2009 |
| SD 28 | "Ninja Assassin View" | November 23, 2009 |
| SD 29 | "Ninja Xmas 2009" | December 10, 2009 |

=== NinJokes ===
| Episode | Title | Released |
|---|---|---|
| 1 | "Bono in a Bar“ | January 31, 2015 |
| 2 | "Lake Trout” | February 7, 2015 |
| 3 | "The Whole Quesadilla” | February 14, 2015 |
| 4 | "A Questionable Burrito” | February 21, 2015 |
| 5 | "Ninjamaica” | March 25, 2015 |
| 6 | "The Ruined Angle" | April 11, 2015 |
| 7 | "The Broken Heart" | April 22, 2015 |
| 8 | "Mythed" | May 9, 2015 |
| 9 | "Net Brutality" | May 30, 2015 |

=== 2025 Reboot ===
| Episode | Title | Released |
|---|---|---|
| 1 | "Ask A Ninja Omnibus What Year Is This?“ | 7th April, 2025 |
| 2 | "Ask A Ninja Omnibus: Zune Vs iPod Ask Your Question In The Comments!“ | 14th April, 2025 |
| 3 | "Is The Ninja Still Doing Movie Reviews?“ | 21st April, 2025 |
| 4 | "Ninja Greenscreen reactions Tag me if you do anything with this“ | 29th April, 2025 |
| 5 | "Mantis Shrimp, Nicklback Gorillas, and The Trolley Problem“ | 6th May, 2025 |
| 6 | "Henry Cavill is cool, Ninjas are accurate, Spirit Halloweens Freak Us Out“ | 21st May, 2025 |
| 7 | "Spiders and Books“ | 2nd June, 2025 |
| 8 | "Meteor Defense Tactics, Ninja Fashion, Cats up?, and Ketchup Conspiracies" | 16th June, 2025 |

== See also ==
- Ninja
- Real Ultimate Power
- YouTube celebrities
