= Atomic Sock Monkey Press =

Game publisher

Atomic Sock Monkey Press (ASMP) is a small press game company that publishes “beer and pretzels” role-playing games and board games. The company is run by Chad Underkoffler, also known for his game columns on RPG.net and Pyramid, as well as writing contributions to Atlas Games' Unknown Armies line.

== History ==
Atomic Sock Monkey Press was founded by Chad Underkoffler with its first game, Monkey, Ninja, Pirate, Robot (2003), released digitally in December 2003. Shannon Appelcline, author of Designers & Dragons (2014), highlighted Underkoffler had been designing a game about sky pirates as his first independent role-playing game for Atomic Sock Monkey, but put that game aside to develop Dead Inside (2004) instead. In 2001, "Phil Reed of Ronin Arts approached Underkoffler about creating a new RPG" which led to the creation of Dead Inside and "as late as 2003, Dead Inside was still bandied around as an upcoming publication for Ronin Arts". However, similarities between Dead Inside and Ronin Arts' The Whispering Vault along with "some thematic disagreements between Reed and Underkoffler regarding Dead Inside" resulted in Underkoffler bringing the game to Atomic Sock Monkey for publication. Appelcline commented "as is often the case in the history of small companies, this singular event would set Atomic Sock Monkey on a trajectory that would define its publications for the next few years". This led to the development of the PDQ system – "by the end of 2006," the company had released "four different games using the PDQ house system" and had licensed the system to other publishers.

Appelcline noted that by late 2007, Underkoffler had realized he did not enjoy the business aspect of the company and came to an agreement with Evil Hat Productions which made "Atomic Sock Monkey into a sort of imprint of Evil Hat: Underkoffler would pitch them an idea, and if they liked it, he'd create a game for them to publish". Due to this arrangement, Underkoffler was finally able to publish his sky pirate game as Swashbucklers of the 7 Skies in 2009.

== Games ==
ASMP’s games include:

- Monkey, Ninja, Pirate, Robot, the Roleplaying Game, a fantasy game wherein characters play archetypal roles based on the character types from the title. Monkey, Ninja, Pirate, Robot Deluxe, a boardgame that shares the same concept, was a 2003 Origins Award Nominee for Best Abstract Board Game.
- Dead Inside, a horror/fantasy RPG based around the concept of characters who have lost or were born without their souls. Dead Inside won the 2004 People's Choice Award in the Indie RPG Awards.
- Truth & Justice, a superhero-based RPG that allows players to take the role of superheroes and supervillains. Truth & Justice won the 2005 Indie RPG Award for Best Support, the 2006 Silver ENnie Award for Best Electronic Book, and the 2006 Silver Award for Innovation (an ENnie Judges' Award).
- The Zorcerer of Zo, a fairytale RPG influenced by fairytale worlds like Oz, Narnia, Wonderland, Fantastica, and others. Zorcerer of Zo won the 2006 Outie Award for Best New RPG.
- Swashbucklers of the Seven Skies, a swashbuckling RPG set in a fantasy world.

== PDQ System ==
Most ASMP games share in common the PDQ (Prose Descriptive Qualities) system, a rules-light game engine that has three different levels of task resolution for any situation, in order to let players resolve encounters in as much or as little detail as desired.

The mechanism is to generate a random number or roll, add a freeform stat or set of stats, and compare to a difficulty number—either a fixed difficulty number or the opponent's roll. In conflicts, the amount which you beat another character's roll by is the amount of damage or failure ranks (see below). Stats are rated in five named ranks: Poor [-2], Average [+0], Good [+2], Expert [+4], and Master [+6].

Conflicts result in the accumulation of either "failure ranks" (which recover at the end of the contest) or "damage ranks" (which may take longer to heal). Each point of either type means that the loser must choose a stat to downgrade by one rank. For example, if a player loses a conflict roll by 3, they must lower three stats each by one rank, or one stat by three ranks (with a minimum of Poor: -2). They can choose any stat to take damage in, such as downgrading a non-combat quality like "Accounting" based on a hit in a fight. When the player cannot lower their stats any more (i.e. a hit when all stats are at Poor [-2]), they lose the contest.

== Licensed Titles ==
The PDQ game system has been licensed for use in other games, including Silver Branch Games' Questers of the Middle Realms and aethereal FORGE's Vox and Ninja Burger 2nd edition.
