= Ghosts/Aliens =

2008 book by Trey Hamburger

GHOSTS/ALIENS
- Cover
- Author: Trey Hamburger
- Illustrator: Worawalan Chantawong
- Language: English
- Genre: Humor
- Publisher: Three Rivers Press
- Publication date: November 2008
- Publication place: United States
- Pages: 272 pp
- ISBN: 978-0-307-40730-6
- Preceded by: REAL Ultimate Power: The Official Ninja Book
- Followed by: Unnamed Episode III of the Hamburger Trilogy

GHOSTS/ALIENS is a humor book written by the pseudonymous Trey Hamburger. The book chronicles the research of two amateur scientists, Trey Hamburger and Mike Stevens, who investigate the possible teleportation of a hot pocket. The investigation soon expands to psychic babies, "Indians", the efficacy of toothpaste foam, the dangers caused by floating pillows, states of bird consciousness, portals in space/time, and so on.

The author sends letters to actual scientists requesting advice about the existence of ghosts, aliens, inter-dimensional portals as well as advice about paranormal combat. Those letters and replies are published in the book.

== Author ==
The author of GHOSTS/ALIENS is also the author of REAL Ultimate Power: The Official Ninja Book. In the 'Hamburger mythology', Trey Hamburger is the cousin of Robert Hamburger, the protagonist of REAL Ultimate Power.

== Television and film ==
U.S. Cable TV network Comedy Central has acquired the television rights to GHOSTS/ALIENS, and Paramount Vantage has acquired the film rights. The pilot titled GHOSTS/ALIENS was directed by Michael Patrick Jann, director of RENO 911.
