= RPGnet =

Forum for tabletop role-playing games

- Screenshot A screenshot of RPGnet home page on November 18, 2018
- Website type: Gaming
- Available in: English
- Owners: Skotos Tech, Inc.
- Website: RPG.net
- Commercial: Yes
- Launched: September 1, 1996; 30 years ago
- Current status: Active

RPGnet is a role-playing game website. It includes sections on wargames, tabletop games and video games, as well as columns on gaming topics.

RPGnet was founded in 1996 by Emma and Sandy Antunes, Shawn Althouse (aka etrigan) and Brian David Phillips, as a way to unify a number of transient game sites. In 2001 it was purchased by Skotos Tech, but maintains creative and editorial autonomy. Currently it is being run by Shannon Appelcline of Skotos, while a number of volunteer moderators and administrators help maintain the forums. In 2024, RPG.net was sold to RPGMatch, who would take over development duties while the administration of the forums was to remain independent.

== RPGnet services ==
=== Forums ===
Originally based on Matt's WWWBoard script, the 1997 RPGnet forums were formatted in earlier message boards' threaded style, being mostly dedicated to game design and industry news. With the change to vBulletin on 2002, new sections catering to the growing player and enthusiast user bases were added. The boards used vBulletin for the next sixteen years, until November, 2018, when they were migrated to the XenForo 2 software package.

Over time, the RPGnet forums have grown to encompass a broad range of subjects related to gaming and modern media. Tabletop Roleplaying Open, the general game discussion forum, has the most posts per day. There are also video games, play-by-post and board games forums, a section dedicated to game design, publishing and brainstorming in general, while the Other Media covers television, comic books, movies and books. The site also hosts small forums for photography, parenting, and other specific interests.

Like most large forums, RPGnet has developed numerous in-jokes, taglines, and recurring flame wars. Many game writers, artists, and designers post. Content and conduct rules are enforced by moderators, who "can do what they feel is necessary in their best judgment to promote the well-being of the forums," even going beyond any written rules, "in order to keep the forums friendly and welcoming." A list of sanctions and bans on users assessed by the moderators is available for public view. RPGnet policies have occasionally been referenced by other platforms and forums when drawing their own policies.

A wide range of tastes are present on the forums. Smaller niche and indie role-playing games are particularly well represented and the latest releases often generate a great deal of discussion. Threads on Dungeons & Dragons, World of Darkness, GURPS and other popular systems are fairly common. Exalted is known for generating a particularly large number of discussion threads.

Other websites will excerpt or reference forum posts that (much as with the Fark PhotoShop contests) have lasting value, such as ZenDesign excerpting WoW-erizing movie quotes and From the Shop Floor borrowing from the Demotivators thread.

=== Reviews ===
Reviews have been an important part of RPGnet since its inception. Today, RPGnet has an active archive of approximately 13,000 reviews. Most reviews are of roleplaying games or supplements. In the last few years, users have contributed numerous reviews of board and card games. RPGnet also publishes reviews of movies, books, music albums and comics, though less frequently.

The review system was overhauled in early 2003 and since then reviews have appeared with numerous cross-references in an effort to improve navigation of the large review archive.

Currently, reviews appear on Mondays, Wednesdays, and Fridays. RPG reviews are published on Mondays and Fridays, while reviews of other products are published on Wednesdays.

=== Columns and articles ===
RPGnet currently has approximately 20 regular columns. Columns are posted on a four-week, Monday-Friday schedule (with 3 to 4 columns posted during a typical week, as per columnist cooperation), with any "extra weeks" in the schedule filled in with additional columns, as they become available. Most columns cover gamemasters offering advice on running roleplaying games to other gamemasters, but there is some variety. This site has become noted as a source for player theory on role-playing games, and these are often written by authors with an academic background.

Notable columns have included: 52 Pickup which promised to offer a new game every week for a year (it got to about a dozen before the initial author gave up, then another dozen before the second one did); Behind the Counter which continues to detail the runnings of a gaming retail store; and Freelancing is Not Free which describes how to freelance in the gaming industry. Noteworthy columnists have included game industry veterans such as Ross Winn, Chad Underkoffler and Matt Drake. Sandy Antunes' monthly column has run without interruption since inception.

The forums include threads describing actual play of role-playing games in concrete terms. These threads include descriptions of how players have overcome specific challenges, and they allow observers to view how a role-playing game is performed without having to actually participate.

The columns software was upgraded in 2006, and it now includes full RSS feeds as well as a variety of database-oriented lookups and full integration into the RPGnet forums.

Prior to 2008, Columns Editing was handled by C.W. Richeson (2008), Shannon Appelcline (2006–2007), Michael Fiegel (2001–2005) and Sandy Antunes (inception - 2001). As of January 2008, it is handled by Shannon Appelcline.

RPGnet columns have been referenced on Slashdot (including "Gaming Girls of GenCon" and "A History of Wizards of the Coast"), as well as on many blogs and gaming sites.

=== Wiki ===
The RPGnet wiki was added in early 2005. Initially conceived as a place for people jointly design roleplaying supplements and game systems, it has also been used assemble an encyclopedia of roleplaying terms and resources, and compile information about ongoing campaigns taking place on the forums.

The RPGnet Wiki is built on MediaWiki, the same software used by Wikipedia.

=== Gaming Index ===
In 2006, RPGnet added a catalog of role-playing games known as the Gaming Index. This system is intended to hold every English RPG product, and is searchable through a variety of means, notable hyperlinks to other products by the publisher, authors or game line and links to RPGnet's reviews of the product. Users can add products, rank, and comment on them. As of November 13, 2018, the site has 19832 games, 3250 additional editions, and 2245 magazines, accounting for 1458 unique game systems.

=== Other features ===
RPGnet formerly featured a RPG store, which is a RPGnet-branded version of RPGShop. The site also offers a membership program which gives subscribers early access to reviews, a few forum privileges, and online access to some Days of Wonder games.

The Game Manufacturers Association (GAMA) publishes a semi-annual journal called Games and Education. As of 1998, past issues of this journal are archived on the RPGnet site.
