= Douglas Sarine =

American actor

- Born: December 1972 (age 53)
- Years active: 2003–present
- Notable work: Ask a Ninja

Douglas Sarine (born December 1972) is an American actor, writer, and producer. He is best known for portraying the ninja in the 2000s comedy podcast Ask a Ninja.

== Career ==
Sarine met Kent Nichols at an improv class at The Second City in Los Angeles in 2000, and in 2005, the two created the online show Ask a Ninja. The podcast aired online from 2005 to 2011, and it was reported in December 2007 that Sarine and Nichols were earning around $100,000 a month in ad revenue and other incomes including merchandising.

Sarkine portrayed Lord Galen in The Escapist's weekly series A Good Knight's Quest in 2010. He has also been a commentator on VH1's Best Week Ever. He was cowriting an adaptation of Attack of the Killer Tomatoes, but is no longer involved with the project. Sarine is represented by UTA and John Elliot of Mosaic Media Group.

Sarine has practised and taught Improv comedy for more than fifteen years.

== Credits ==
=== Acting ===
Outside of Ask a Ninja, Sarine has acted in Killer Name (2004), Rodney (2004), Behind The Smile (2006), Jimmy Kimmel Live! (2006), The Office (2006), Punk'd (2007), Curb Your Enthusiasm (2007), Monk (2008), Team A.P.O.C.A.L.Y.P.S.E. (2009), Easy to Assemble (2009), The Webventures of Justin and Alden (2010), A Good Knight's Quest (2010), Family Valuables (2011), Sarah's Ghost (2012), Aperture R&D (2013), Knights in Hyrule (2014), Mad Man Advise the House of Game of Thrones (2014), Meccanoid the G's (2015), Deal (2019), and 1968 Blackflower Drive (2024—2025).

=== Producing ===
Sarine has worked as a producer for the following films and television shows: Killer Name (2004), Disney's Haunted Holidays; Tale of Two Cities (2009), Kinect Family Video Ideas (2010), Disney's Hannah Montana Style Competition (2011), What's Trending (2011), Disney Aim High, Marcin Gortat (2012), Power Rangers Dubstep (2012), Power Rangers Sport Highlights (2012), Power Rangers Mega Album Playlist (2012), Saban's Power Rangers Morph Through 20 Years (2013), Disneys Haydi Calkala, Dans Dans (2013), DJ Quintino Go Hard Vote Hard (2014), Huge on the Tube (2015), Skater Vs... (2015), Meccanoid the G's (2015), Skin (2016), Work/Friends (2018), Sexxy Dancer (2018), Bootstrapped (2019), Deal (2019), IV-effing (2019), Site Unseen (2020), Not (Blank) Enough (2020—2021), Week by Week (2020—2022), Just the Two of Us (2021), and Possiblities (2024).

=== Writing ===
Sarine has written for productions including Baggage (2003), Killer Name (2004), Disney's Haunted Holidays; Tale of Two Cities (2009), Kinect Family Video Ideas (2010), What's Trending (2011), Power Rangers Dubstep (2012), Power Rangers Sport Highlights (2012), Power Rangers Mega Album Playlist (2012), Aperture R&D (2013), Saban's Power Rangers Morph Through 20 Years (2013), Explored (2013—2014), DJ Quintino Go Hard Vote Hard (2014), Skater Vs... (2015), Meccanoid the G's (2015), and Site Unseen (2020).
