= Michael Fiegel =

American writer and game designer

Michael L. Fiegel is an American writer and game designer who has worked primarily on role-playing games.

== Career ==
=== Role-playing games ===
Fiegel was the columns editor for RPGnet from 2001 to 2005, as well as a columnist.

In 2001, Fiegel began working with Jerry Grayson of Khepera Publishing on the second edition of that company's GODSEND Agenda (2001), a superhero role-playing game set in the modern world. Fiegel later co-wrote and co-designed Khepera's HELLAS: Worlds of Sun and Stone (2008) alongside Grayson. He also wrote later books in the Hellas series.

Fiegel is also the creator of Ninja Burger and the author of the Ninja Burger RPG:2nd Edition (2006) and the Ninja Burger: Honorable Employee Handbook (2006). In 2009, he also wrote and published the modern horror/conspiracy-themed Vox RPG.

He also wrote the Baba Yaga: The First Setting in Rassiya electronic RPG supplement for Dog Soul Publishing, which won a 2006 Gold ENnie award for Best Electronic Book and was nominated for Best Writing.

=== PC games ===
Fiegel has worked as a writer for two MMORPGs: Perpetual Entertainment's Gods & Heroes: Rome Rising, and NCsoft's Aion: Assault on Balaurea. He was also the lead writer for the sci-fi-themed interactive fiction game The Away Team.

=== Books ===
Outside of Ninja Burger: Honorable Employee Handbook (published by Kensington/Citadel in 2006), is Fiegel's first novel, Blackbird, published on November 14, 2017, by Skyhorse.
