= The Webventures of Justin and Alden =

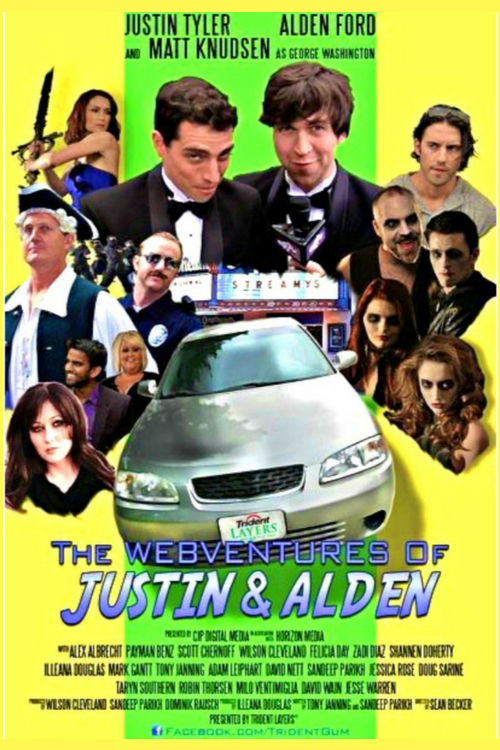
- Promotional poster
- Genre: Comedy
- Created by: Sandeep Parikh; Tony Janning; Wilson Cleveland
- Directed by: Sean Michael Becker
- Starring: Justin Tyler; Alden Ford; Matt Knudsen; Felicia Day; Shannen Doherty; Illeana Douglas; Tony Janning; Alex Albrecht; Wilson Cleveland; Taryn Southern; Jessica Lee Rose; Douglas Sarine; Milo Ventimiglia; David Wain
- Country of origin: United States
- Original language: English
- No. of seasons: 1
- No. of episodes: 5

Production
- Producers: Wilson Cleveland; Illeana Douglas; Sandeep Parikh; Dominik Rausch
- Production location: Los Angeles
- Cinematography: Chris Darnell
- Camera setup: Single-camera
- Running time: 5–10 minutes

Original release
- Network: My Damn Channel; CollegeHumor; YouTube
- Release: April 27 – May 25, 2010

The Webventures of Justin and Alden is an American comedy web series co-created and produced by Wilson Cleveland, Sandeep Parikh, Dominik Rausch and Illeana Douglas, who all make appearances in the show. The series, sponsored by Trident in association with the Streamy Awards debuted on My Damn Channel on April 27, 2010 with an introduction from Grace Helbig as well as on CollegeHumor, YouTube and Atom.com (later acquired by Comedy Central).

== Premise ==
The fictional series takes place on April 11, 2010 - the day of the real-life 2nd Annual Streamy Awards. Justin Tyler and Alden Ford play struggling actors who write a web series script and road trip across Los Angeles to crash The Streamy Awards and convince Felicia Day to be the star of their show.

== Reception ==
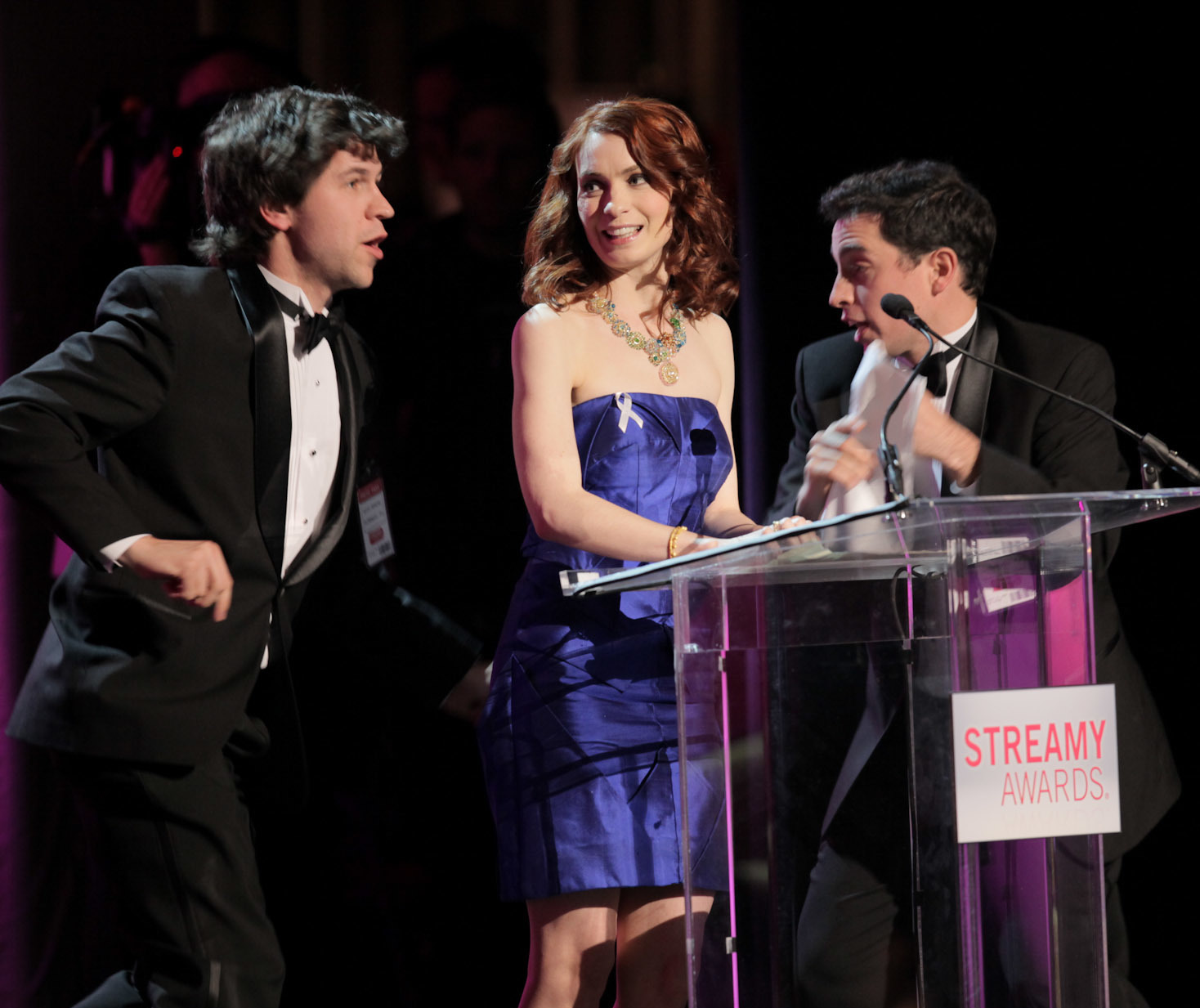
Justin, Alden and Felicia Day on stage during the 2010 Streamy Awards

Despite the negative response and controversy surrounding the live The 2nd Annual Streamy Awards event, Webventures received generally favorable reviews from critics. In her April 29, 2010 review, USA Today critic Whitney Matheson called Webventures a "delightful new show" that "includes parodies of several popular web series, including The Guild and Dr. Horrible. Adweek's Todd Wasserman complained, "Webventures contains no LOL moments," but "the moment when Tyler breaks the fourth wall is somewhat risible."

The series was nominated for Best Branded Entertainment series at the 2011 Banff World Media Festival.

== Episodes ==
No.	Title	Directed by	Written by	Original release date
1	"A Questionable Quest"	Sean Michael Becker	Sandeep Parikh; Tony Janning	April 26, 2010
What is the quickest way to fame and riches? Simple, make a web series. Come along as Justin and Alden, web series script in hand, begin their epic, 4 mile road trip across Los Angeles in search of fame, glory and Felicia Day.
2	"1760"	Sean Michael Becker	Sandeep Parikh; Tony Janning	May 4, 2010
A road trip without time travel and celebrity hitchhikers? Not in this town. Justin and Alden's friendship is put to the ultimate test when they offer Illeana Douglas a ride to the Streamy Awards. Also starring Tony Janning and Matt Knudsen.
3	"Back to the Present"	Sean Michael Becker	Sandeep Parikh; Tony Janning	May 11, 2010
Justin and Alden fight a battle of wits against Hollywood's latest craze, then find themselves within reach of their ultimate goal: getting to the Streamy Awards to give Felicia Day their web series script! Also starring Douglas Sarine, Taryn Southern and Jessica Lee Rose.
4	"The Streamys"	Sean Michael Becker	Sandeep Parikh; Tony Janning	May 18, 2010
It's all glitz and glamour as Justin and Alden make their way on the Streamy Awards red carpet, posing as press. When they catch a glimpse of their dream leading lady Felicia Day, they quickly hatch the perfect plan. And by perfect we mean very poorly thought out in every possible way. Also starring Felicia Day, Wilson Cleveland, David Wain, Alex Albrecht, Mark Gantt, Phil Lamarr and Zadi Diaz.
5	"The Last Episode"	Sean Michael Becker	Sandeep Parikh; Tony Janning	May 25, 2010
Having escaped death for the 3rd time in as many hours, our courageous duo are ready to accept defeat, Justin and Alden realize all they ever needed were each other. Also starring Felicia Day, Robin Thorsen, Shannen Doherty and Milo Ventimiglia
