= Chad Underkoffler =

American role-playing game designer

- Occupation: Game designer

Chad Underkoffler is a game designer who has worked primarily on role-playing games.

== Career ==
Chad Underkoffler had done some work as a game designer for both Atlas Games and Steve Jackson Games in the early 2000s. Underkoffler has published his PDQ indie role-playing games through his company Atomic Sock Monkey Press, including the fairytale RPG, The Zorcerer of Zo, and Truth & Justice in the superhero genre. He also designed the horror fantasy game Dead Inside. Evil Hat Productions brought on Underkoffler to help with The Dresden Files Roleplaying Game in 2007. Leonard Balsera became the Lead System Developer for Dresden Files and Underkoffler took on the role of Lead Setting Developer, building on the work done by Genevieve Cogman. Underkoffler designed Swashbucklers of the 7 Skies (2009) for Evil Hat, which was a more traditional type of role-playing game than some of the other games the company had been releasing.
