= Real Ultimate Power =

2002 satire website

The Official Ninja Webpage: Real Ultimate Power
- Website type: Satire
- Creator: Robert Hamburger (pseudonym)
- Website: www.realultimatepower.net
- Launched: 2002

The Official Ninja Webpage: Real Ultimate Power is a satire website created in 2002 by the pseudonymous Robert Hamburger. Written using the persona of a 13-year-old boy, the site is a parody of adolescent fascination with Ninjas. Warren St. John, columnist for The New York Times described it as "a satirical ode to the masculine prowess of ninjas".

In 2004, it was chosen by Kensington Books for their inaugural book release in the new fratire genre—non-fiction literature marketed to young men in a politically incorrect and overtly masculine fashion. Due to the website's fan base, the Real Ultimate Power, The Official Ninja Book became a cult hit, selling 35,000 copies in two years. The success of the book prompted Kensington's release of other fratire books by Tucker Max and Maddox.

The Real Ultimate Power concept developed an internet meme with the creation of dozens of imitation parody websites.

== Website ==
The Real Ultimate Power website is written under the pseudonym "Robert Hamburger", who was described in 2006 as a Michigan writer in his 20s. The author has declined to be identified, stating that it would diminish the satirical concept of the fictional pre-adolescent boy.

The homepage describes ninjas through three "facts": Number one, Ninjas are mammals; Number two, Ninjas fight all the time; and Number three, the purpose of the ninja is to flip out and kill people. The three facts became an internet meme which spawned numerous imitation Real Ultimate Power websites dedicated, for example, to Conan O'Brien, liquor store clerks, wizards, and sorority girls.

Other content on the website includes "pump-up" movie scripts and short stories about ninjas. One frequent theme titled "Ninjas versus Pirates" is commonly referenced in video games and other mainstream media. There is a photograph gallery with fan-submitted images, links to other Ninja-related sites, and a forum.

A popular feature is the Hate Mail section. For example, one letter disputed the site's claim to have seen a real ninja on the grounds that "there are less than 50 real ones left, and only 5 live in the US". Regarding the authenticity of the hate mail, the author said that some of the hate email is written by him, while others, such as the ones from an apparent real ninja signed Soke D. Fujita, were authentic.

== Book ==
Real Ultimate Power, The Official Ninja Book (ISBN 978-0-8065-2569-3) was published on July 1, 2004, by Citadel. The book was rejected by 11 publishers before being chosen by Kensington Books, the parent company of Citadel. According to Nielsen BookScan, 35,000 copies were sold by 2006. In 2008 a sequel was released, titled Ghosts/Aliens.

== See also ==
- List of Internet phenomena
