= Pirates vs. Ninjas Dodgeball =

2008 video game

- Developer: Blazing Lizard
- Publisher: Gamecock Media Group
- Platforms: Xbox 360 (XBLA), Wii
- Release: Xbox 360: WW: September 3, 2008; Wii: NA: May 14, 2009; EU: June 12, 2009; AU: September 24, 2009
- Genre: Sports
- Modes: Single-player, multiplayer

Pirates vs. Ninjas Dodgeball is a fantasy dodgeball video game developed by American studio Blazing Lizard and published by Gamecock for Xbox Live Arcade and SouthPeak Games for the Wii. The game was released on September 3, 2008 for Xbox Live Arcade, while the Wii version was released in 2009. Both were poorly received by critics. The Xbox 360 version has an aggregated Metacritic review score of 44/100 and the lowest review is 16/100.

The game is inspired by the popular Internet meme Pirates versus Ninjas. It is played between various oddball groups, including the eponymous Pirate and Ninja teams, as well as other teams like the zombies and robots. Players on each team behave stereotypically, e.g., zombies are slow and defensive.

== Gameplay ==
Gameplay screenshot

Players have a limited reserve of energy to use when playing, and all activity drains energy, including running and throwing. Each group has a unique set of powers, such as cloaking, which drains energy even faster. Players can regain energy by various actions, such as successfully catching a thrown ball.

The ball can be thrown in several ways. Throwing the ball while running causes the ball to move in the direction faced. Throwing the ball while standing still allows a 360 degree aim, with better tracking. Throwing the ball while jumping increases the force at which the ball hits.

== Reception ==
Reception

Aggregate score
Aggregator	Score	
Aggregator	Wii	Xbox 360
Metacritic	46/100	44/100

Review scores
Publication	Score	
Publication	Wii	Xbox 360
Destructoid	N/A	3.5/10
Eurogamer	N/A	4/10
GamePro	N/A	2.75/5
GameRevolution	N/A	D−
GameSpot	N/A	3.5/10
IGN	4.6/10	4.5/10
NGamer	48%	N/A
Official Xbox Magazine (UK)	N/A	6/10
Official Xbox Magazine (US)	N/A	6/10
TeamXbox	N/A	3.1/10

The game received "generally unfavorable reviews" on both platforms according to the review aggregation website Metacritic. Official Xbox Magazine gave the Xbox 360 version a score of six out of ten, over five months before the game was released.

== See also ==
- Double D Dodgeball
- Super Dodge Ball
