= Pirates versus Ninjas =

Internet meme

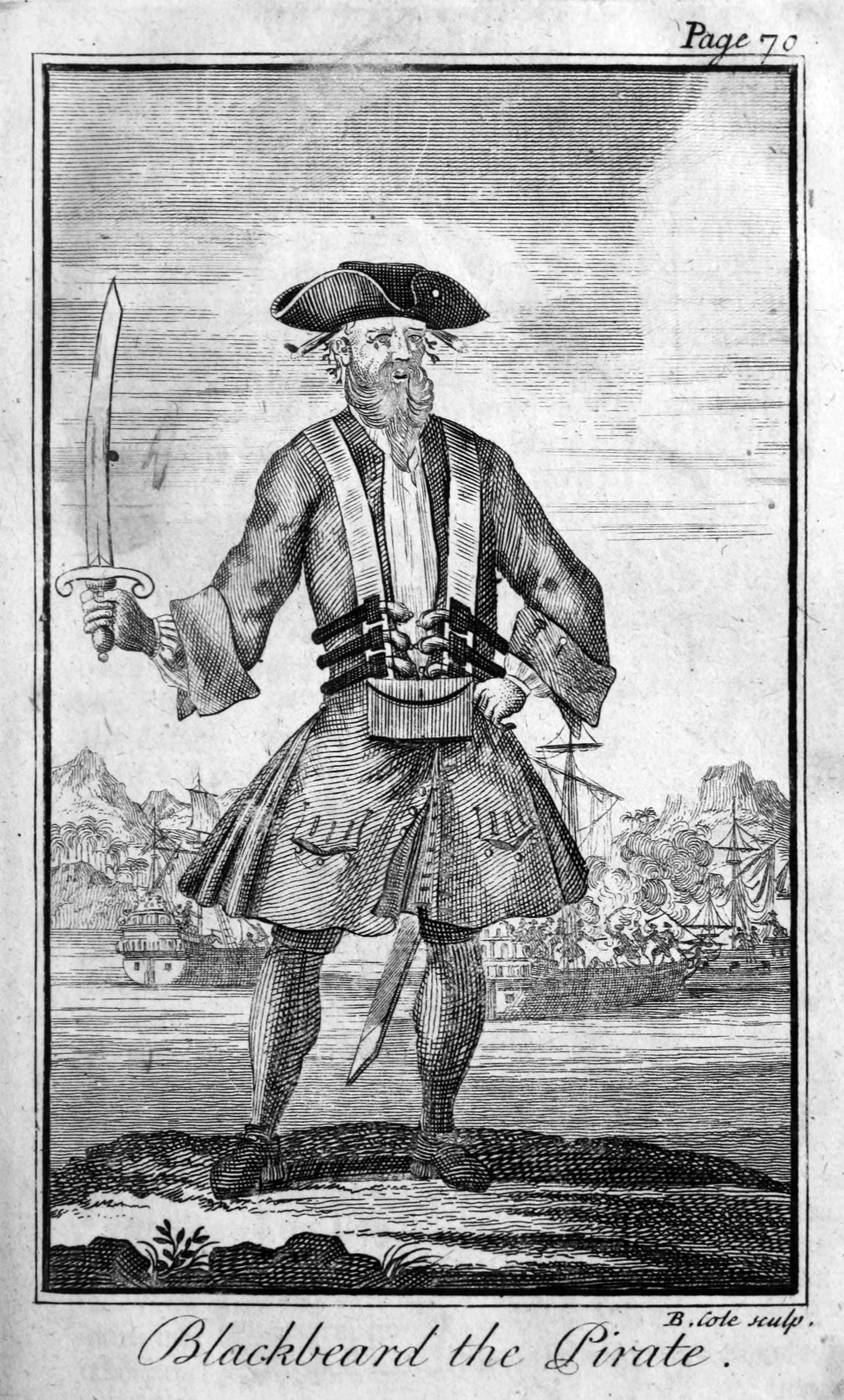
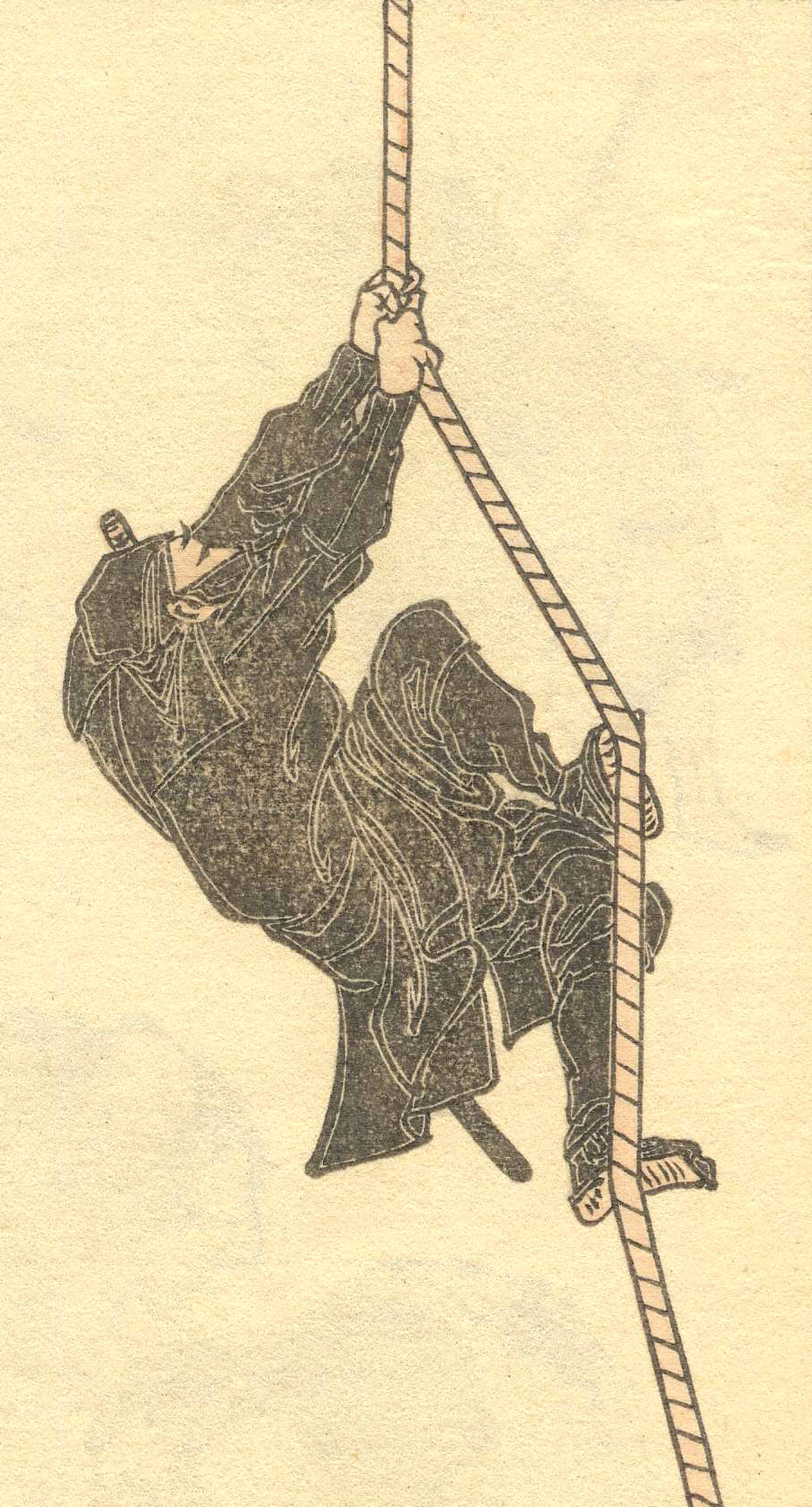
A pirate (left) and a ninja (right)

Pirates vs. Ninjas was a comedic Internet and gaming meme from the late 2000s regarding a theoretical conflict between archetypal Western pirates and Japanese ninjas, generally including arbitrary "debate" over which side would win in a fight. The meme is sometimes referred to as PvN and has a long history on the Internet. Humorist Jake Kalish writes (in the pro-ninja column) that the reason for the popularity of the meme is that "pirates and ninjas are both cool, but kind of opposite, see, because one is loud and the other ... never mind." Several competitive web sites and games based upon the ninjas vs. pirates theme appeared later, including Pirates vs. Ninjas Dodgeball.

Ninja supporters hold the position that a ninja would win over a pirate because of their superior mental and physical capabilities, as well as usage of gadgets such as nunchaku and shuriken. Those who support pirates argue that a pirate's use of both sword and gun would ensure their victory in battle.

The debate has accumulated a wide following in cyberculture. A wide array of YouTube videos, websites, and online debate forums can be linked to the pirate vs. ninja conflict.
