= Truth & Justice (role-playing game) =

Tabletop role-playing game

- Truth & Justice Cover
- Designers: Chad Underkoffler
- Publishers: Atomic Sock Monkey Press
- Publication: 2005
- Genres: Superhero
- Systems: PDQ

Truth & Justice is an "indie" tabletop role-playing game designed to emulate the superhero genre. It was created by Chad Underkoffler and published by Atomic Sock Monkey Press. The game allows players to take the role of superheroes and supervillains.

== System ==
The game uses a modified version of the Prose Descriptive Qualities or PDQ system. PDQ offers three different levels of task resolution for any situation, in order to let players resolve encounters in as much or as little detail as possible.

Compared to the standard PDQ system, T&J divides stats into normal scale and super scale. (This is similar to the "mega-damage" mechanic in Rifts, or the "mega-dice" mechanic in Aberrant.) Therefore, one character may have Good [+2] Strength (i.e. normal scale) and another has Good [+2] Super-strength (i.e. super scale). Normal scale must roll 2d6+2 for typical tasks. In contrast, super-strength will automatically succeed at normal scale tasks, but must make a 2d6+2 roll for tasks as rated on the super scale. Super-scale damage on a normal-scale target adds the power's Target Number (i.e. 5 to 13) to the damage ranks done. Normal-scale attacks can still affect super-scale targets as failure ranks, though they cannot do damage per se.

== Settings ==
The first chapter of Truth & Justice discusses common tropes of the superhero stories and how they can be implemented in an RPG. Topics addressed include T&J "philosophy" (Lies vs. Truth; Injustice vs. Justice; Heroism; Mad, Beautiful Ideas), the differences between human-scale and superhuman-scale abilities or events, the differences in superheroic styles, namely Grim 'n Gritty; Cinematic; Four Color; Animated. It also lists list of common comic book tropes.

There are three superheroic settings included within the book, each with their own chapter:

"Second-String Supers" places the player characters in a world where the world-class heroes have left to deal with a situation of grave importance. The PCs take the roles of the less experienced supers, teenage sidekicks, aging pulp heroes, or reformed villains who must protect humanity in the first-stringers' absence.

"SuperCorps" is a near future setting where powered individuals work in well-paid security, troubleshooters, or researchers jobs. Whether as employees of one of the globe-spanning multinational corporations or as self-employed "super-consultants," PCs must balance their ethics, morals, and paychecks in a dangerous world.

"Fanfare for the Amplified Man" is a "ripped from the headlines" setting, where a certain few individuals (including the PCs) have received a mysterious piece of jewelry that grants them superpowers. Ideas for running secret superheroic campaigns and freeform adaptation of current events for gaming are included in this chapter; the overall theme is an exploration not only of the "great power vs. great responsibility" issue, but also the ability of one person to change the world.

== History ==
The game was originally published in PDF and Print on Demand format in July 2005, and a print version became available through distributed retail in 2006.

As of March 2007, there are two Truth & Justice supplements: Dial S for Superhumans, a free, downloadable PDF created by several contributors; and The Turtlezilla Dossier focusing on a giant kaiju known as Turtlezilla, a downloadable PDF for purchase.

=== Awards ===
Truth & Justice won the 2005 Indie RPG Award for Best Support, the 2006 Silver ENnie Award for Best Electronic Book and the 2006 Silver Award for Innovation (an ENnie Judges' Award).

== Reviews ==
- Pyramid
