= Dead Inside (game) =

Tabletop horror role-playing game by Chad Underkoffler

- Dead Inside cover
- Designers: Chad Underkoffler
- Publishers: Atomic Sock Monkey Press
- Publication: 2003
- Genres: Horror, Fantasy
- Systems: PDQ

Dead Inside is a horror/fantasy role-playing game by Chad Underkoffler, published by Atomic Sock Monkey Press. Player characters are "Dead Inside", who have lost or were born without their souls and strive to regain or rebuild them. The game provides a variety of means by which souls may be lost, stolen, traded, regained or rebuilt.

The game is considered unusual for its attempt to reverse the typical "Kill monsters and take their stuff" path to power found in most RPGs and replace it with the "Heal people and give them stuff" concept. Essentially, selfless and noble actions by the characters are rewarded with Soul Points, the measure of a character's soul integrity. These Soul Points can be used to fuel metaphysical powers or to improve a character's abilities, much as experience points are used in other RPGs.

Dead Inside won the People's Choice Award in the 2004 Indie RPG Awards.

== Cosmology ==
Dead Inside is chiefly divided into two realms – the stable, modern-day "Real World" and the dreamlike, mercurial "Spirit World".

The "Real World" is familiar and mostly devoid of the supernatural, at least on the surface (all supernatural powers and abilities in the game are weak and very difficult to use there). Its main denizens are "Average People" – those who own their original soul, who are incapable of visiting the Spirit World or perceiving the supernatural.

The "Spirit World" is an ever shifting dreamscape. Its geography is hard to pin down, but consists of five chief areas: the Wood in the East, the Waste in the South, the Mists in the North, the Sea to the West, and in the center, The City.

Across the Sea (although direction has little real meaning in the Spirit World) lies the Source; the centre of the cosmos from which all souls are born and to which they return after death.

Outside of this whole lies the Void, a limitless expanse of utter nothingness, into which any soul is lost forever. It is said that the Real World protects the Spirit World and Source from the Void much as the shell of an egg protects the yolk.

The Real and Spirit Worlds may be travelled between by the supernaturally aware via "Gates": shimmering portals between the realms that can be opened by those who know how. It is impossible to travel to the Source short of death; or at least, no-one who has ever attempted the trip has returned.

== The concept of Soul ==
The concept of Soul is key to Dead Inside. It is key to one's spiritual well-being – beings without enough soul (like the Dead Inside) feel a strong sense of loss, of being empty, which manifests as physical and emotional desensitivity, depression, even pain. Those with plenty of soul, conversely, are dynamic, energetic and full of life.

Soul is also a valuable resource and commodity. It can be expended to use supernatural Abilities and Powers, it can be traded and it can even be stolen.

It is also a moral barometer – different actions are regarded as either 'soul-cultivating' or 'soul rotting'. In this way it is possible to gain or lose soul based purely upon how your character acts, although the justification for action is also important. Players are thus encouraged to role-play in a selfless and virtuous manner, and also to explain 'why' their characters act in the way they do.

In the mechanics of the game, your amount of soul is expressed as "Soul Points".

== Character types ==
The game features a wide variety of types of characters, most of which are suitable for use by players (depending on the power level desired). They include:

=== Average People ===
People with exactly the right amount of soul, such that they have a thickened spiritual "shell" around themselves. Due to this spiritual health, they are protected from (but also blinded to) most forms of supernatural influence. Their souls can be stolen by cracking the "shell" (although this is difficult), or they can be traded away with the owner's consent (easier). An Average Person who loses their soul for whatever reason becomes Dead Inside.

=== Dead Inside ===
Beings who lack a complete soul. As they lack the "shell" of Average People, the Dead Inside are aware of the supernatural; however, they lack the spiritual resources to make frequent use of supernatural powers. Instead, most Dead Inside seek to regain their old souls, or build new ones. If they are successful in this endeavour and they manage to 'ensoul', they will become Sensitives. If, however, they lose their last shards of a soul, they will become Qlippoth.

=== Sensitives ===
Beings with more than enough soul, Sensitives are vibrant individuals. Their surfeit of soulstuff allows them to use supernatural abilities more often, but not greatly so. Sensitives may be helpers, seeking to aid the Dead Inside and other beings. Others are less selfless - some remain happy with their lot; still others go on to seek further power by becoming Magi.

=== Magi ===
Beings with a double soul (that is, twice as much as an average person), Magi possess significant spiritual power, of which they will make frequent use.

=== Zombis ===
Dead bodies lacking souls, Zombis possess only just enough spiritual force to keep them preserved and animated. As such, they become emotionless, cold beings. They are not stupid or slow, however - their cold rationality and force of will mean they are often smart, skilled and strong, and many have had centuries of existence to practice. Dead Inside become Zombis when they die, and the death of a Mage will also create a Zombi (as well as a Ghost). Zombis can also lose their last shreds of a soul. If they are in the real world, they stop moving, and finally appear to be dead. If they lose these shreds in the Spiritual World, they become Qlippoth.

=== Ghosts ===
Dead souls lacking bodies are ordinarily called back to the Source; however, some remain in the Worlds (both Real and Spirit), usually due to some ties they still have to their previous existence. These beings are Ghosts.

=== Qlippoths ===
Beings that no longer have any trace of a soul. They hate everything and wish for the destruction of the Source to end their suffering. They consume souls to ease their suffering. All others revile Qlippoths as abominations.

== Author and publisher ==
The game was created by Chad Underkoffler and is produced by Atomic Sock Monkey Press, a small-press RPG company.

== Reception ==
Bruce Baugh commented on how the game was a natural development for Underkoffler: "I've seen this desire--to get away from the killing-and-stealing stereotype and closer to characters who do good for the world and improve themselves--in Chad's other work. He's been poking at it for a while." Eric Rowe calls Dead Inside "the psychological equivalent of a dentist's mirror. It lets you examine things in hard-to-see places." Baugh also says that Underkoffler would face a challenge to get Dead Inside to reach a large audience: "Games fighting convention face the distinct challenges of not only finding an audience, but creating one as well. If a game isn't fun to play, it's failed."

== Reviews ==
- Pyramid
- Backstab #48
